= 2025–26 Hull City A.F.C. season =

English football club season

Hull City
2025–26 season
- Owner: Acun Medya
- Chairman: Acun Ilıcalı
- Head coach: Sergej Jakirović
- Stadium: MKM Stadium
- Championship: 6th (promoted via play-offs)
- Play-offs: Winners
- FA Cup: Fourth round
- EFL Cup: First round
- Top goalscorer: League: Oli McBurnie (17); All: Oli McBurnie (19)
- Highest home attendance: 24,616 (v Norwich City, 2 May, Championship); 24,623 (v Millwall, 8 May, play-offs); 24,320 (v Chelsea, 13 February, FA Cup)
- Lowest home attendance: 18,624 (v Preston North End, 30 September, Championship)
- Average home league attendance: 21,400
- Biggest win: 3–0 (v Preston North End, 20 January, Championship)
- Biggest defeat: 0–4 (v Chelsea, 13 February, FA Cup)
Home colours	Away colours	Third colours

The 2025–26 season was the 122nd season in the history of Hull City Association Football Club, and their fifth consecutive season in the Championship. In addition to the domestic league, the club also participated in the FA Cup and the EFL Cup.

After finishing in 6th place, Hull prevailed against Middlesbrough in the play-off final, thus sealing a return to the Premier League for the first time since the 2016–17 season. They also became the first 6th place team to be promoted to the top flight since 2010.

== Season summary ==
=== Pre-season ===
==== May ====
On 15 May 2025, following the conclusion of the 2024–25 season, head coach Rubén Sellés was dismissed from his role. His coaching team, consisting of James Oliver-Pearce and Tobias Loveland, were also dismissed. On 17 May, Hull announced their retained list. Left-back Brandon Fleming was the headline departure, leaving the club after 16 years. Wingers Nordin Amrabat and Doğukan Sinik also left, among others. On 21 May, Martin Hodge was announced as the club's new Head of Recruitment. The following week, on 29 May, the head coach of the U18s, David Meyler, left his role at the club after Cork City signed him as their new assistant manager.

==== June ====
On 11 June, Sellés' replacement was unveiled when Sergej Jakirović was appointed as the new head coach, signing a two-year deal. He was joined by his own coaching staff, consisting of Marko Salatović, Marin Ivančić, and Anđelo Roguljić. Following Jakirović's arrival, Moroccan midfielder Reda Laalaoui became the club's first official signing of the summer window, signing from FUS Rabat for £400,000 on a four-year deal. Experienced duo Dillon Phillips and Semi Ajayi then agreed Bosman deals with the Tigers, amidst a flurry of outgoings.

Firstly, Xavier Simons permanently moved to Bolton Wanderers, whilst Thimothée Lo-Tutala was loaned back to Doncaster Rovers for a second time, having previously been there in the second half of the 2023–24 season. On 19 June, João Pedro left the club by mutual consent. This news came just over a month after he had agreed a new contract with Hull. Elsewhere, ex-academy graduate Andy Smith moved to League Two side Gillingham after 14 years with the Tigers, before Anthony Racioppi returned to his native Switzerland by signing for Sion. The fixtures for the upcoming season were then released on 26 June, with Hull drawn away to Coventry City on the opening day and at home to Norwich City on the final day.

==== July ====
On 2 July, Dean Holden was announced as an additional assistant head coach to support Jakirović and his team. As a result, Andy Dawson swapped his position as a first team coach for a new role as Head of Player Development. On 4 July, Hull were hit with a fee-restricting transfer embargo from the EFL, set to last three transfer windows. The embargo was reportedly placed due to late payments to Aston Villa the previous season, over the loan of Louie Barry. The club immediately reacted by stating their intent to appeal the decision. More news surfaced on 7 July, when it came to light that a similar issue with payments to Manchester City over the loan of Fin Burns had led to a further embargo, although it had already been lifted by the time the press were notified. Despite the worrying headlines, owner Acun Ilıcalı remained calm when questioned for his opinion and reassured supporters that the situation was simply "a misunderstanding". As a result of the initial embargo, the recent signings of Gustavo Puerta and Reda Laalaoui were put in jeopardy, with the club unable to register either player with the EFL.

Whilst awaiting to have their appeal heard, the Tigers began acting in accordance with their new fee restriction, which stopped them from paying any form of transfer fee for a new player. By this time, a second wave of departures had begun, with Matty Jacob loaned to Reading for the season and Marvin Mehlem returning to Germany on a permanent basis with Arminia Bielefeld. Towards the end of the month, two of Hull's longest-serving players left the club. On 19 July, after six years with the Tigers, versatile defender Sean McLoughlin moved to fellow Championship side Blackburn Rovers for £500,000. Then, on 26 July, vice-captain Alfie Jones headed to Middlesbrough for a £3,000,000 fee, following half a decade in black and amber. Young centre-back Charlie Hughes was in turn promoted to replace Jones as deputy to captain Lewie Coyle. That week also saw Abdülkadir Ömür and Mason Burstow go out on season-long loans, to Antalyaspor and Bolton Wanderers respectively. Then, over three weeks after the news broke, the first new face since the fee restriction arrived. Having seen out his contract with Sheffield Wednesday, 26-year-old Akin Famewo penned a two-year deal with the Tigers on 29 July. Furthermore, two important loans were secured prior to the start of August. England U19 winger Joel Ndala, as well as former Young Lion John Lundstram both made temporary switches to Hull for the campaign.

=== Opening months ===
==== August ====
Player of the Month: Joe Gelhardt
Goal of the Month: Oli McBurnie (v Oxford United)

Although there was still no update on the fee restriction, transfer business continued throughout the run-up to the start of the new season. On 1 August, former Turkey youth international Enis Destan joined for free from Trabzonspor, signing a three-year deal. Then, following just one season with Hull, midfielder Steven Alzate left the club for MLS outfit Atlanta United, moving for a fee of £1,750,000. It had taken most of the summer to find a replacement for João Pedro, but on 6 August the Tigers acquired former Sheffield United target man Oli McBurnie, shortly after he had terminated his contract with Spanish side Las Palmas. The next day, goalkeeper Harvey Cartwright was loaned out to Hartlepool United for the season.

Prior to kick-off on opening day away at Coventry City, the club announced the return of Joe Gelhardt for his second spell on loan from Leeds United. His redebut in black and amber came that afternoon as a substitute at the CBS Arena. The Tigers went on to achieve a point in Jakirović's first competitive fixture in charge of Hull, having played out a goalless draw with their hosts. Three days later, they drew again, although eventually lost via penalty shoot-out, after a thrilling 3–3 battle with Wrexham in the EFL Cup. Hull's first goal of the season was scored by McBurnie, with the English-born Scotsman finding the net on 36 minutes to level the tie after going 1–0 down at the Racecourse Ground. On 15 August, the squad strengthened yet further with the additions of winger David Akintola and left-back Brandon Williams. It was the first time Williams had been registered at a club since his release from Manchester United in 2024 and, more recently, his suspended prison sentence for dangerous driving only three months earlier. The opening home fixture of the campaign soon followed on 17 August, as the Tigers secured a late 3–2 victory over Oxford United, thanks to goals from Gelhardt and Matt Crooks, plus a stoppage-time winner from McBurnie.

News on the outcome of Hull's fee restriction appeal finally broke on 19 August. The EFL and their Club Financial Reporting Unit (CFRU) made public that the restriction had been reduced from three transfer windows to just two. However, they also announced that the third window had only been suspended, meaning that if the club made any further financial violation before 1 July 2026, the third window would be reinstated. The result of the decision left Hull stuck being able to only sign free agents and bring in loans for the remainder of the campaign. As the month drew to a close, the issues off the pitch were reflected in performances on it, as the Tigers suffered heavy defeats in consecutive league fixtures against Blackburn Rovers and Bristol City. The only positive news to come out of the two losses was the welcome return of Mohamed Belloumi, who had just recovered from an ACL injury he had been sidelined with since November 2024.

==== September ====
Player of the Month: Oli McBurnie
Goal of the Month: John Lundstram (v Southampton)

At 19:00 on 1 September, the summer transfer window shut. Prior to the deadline, Abu Kamara was loaned out to pre-season opponents Getafe, in turn allowing for Bosnia and Herzegovina international Amir Hadžiahmetović to arrive on a season-long loan from Beşiktaş. Hull's final signing of the window was Darko Gyabi, who signed a three-year contract having been allowed to leave Leeds United on a free transfer. Finally, despite the club making no official announcement, there was now confirmation that the transfer of Gustavo Puerta had been annulled, after the Colombian moved from his former team Bayer Leverkusen to Segunda División side Racing de Santander. Similarly, it came to light that the transfer of Reda Laalaoui had met the same fate, when he was unveiled at Belgian club Westerlo on 8 September. The next day, Hull announced that £15 million of their shareholder loan had been converted into equity in order to help strengthen the club's finances.

Following the international break, the Tigers returned to league action on 13 September. Away at Swansea City, goals from McBurnie and John Egan were required to earn a hard-fought point in South Wales, after Hull had gone 2–0 down inside 40 minutes. Jakirović's side would have to wait only another week for their second win of the season, beating recently relegated Southampton 3–1 at the MKM. Momentum was then lost in an uninspiring performance away at Watford, which in turn bled into a difficult evening at home to Preston North End, notable for an Ivor Pandur blunder and the long-awaited return of Liam Millar from injury. The Tigers sat 18th by the end of the month.

==== October ====
Player of the Month: Joe Gelhardt
Goal of the Month: Liam Millar (v Leicester City)

Pandur soon recovered his form in remarkable fashion on 4 October, saving a late penalty from Harrison Burrows to secure an important 1–0 win over Sheffield United ahead of the next international break. On 10 October, ex-Blade McBurnie was named as the EFL Championship Player of the Month for September. Meanwhile the following week, another former Blades' player, this time midfielder Lundstram, was ruled out for six weeks with a calf injury he had sustained against his old club. On 18 October, league play resumed. In an ill-tempered affair at St Andrew's, Hull ran out 3–2 winners against Birmingham City to claim their first away victory of the campaign, coincidentally also ending the hosts' run of 29 home games unbeaten. The match was littered with flashpoints, with the most prominent of these coming towards the end of the first half when a touchline brawl broke out between both teams' coaching staff and players. Birmingham were later fined £115,000, whereas Hull were only fined £25,000. A 2–1 win at the MKM over another recently relegated side in Leicester City took the Tigers as high as 7th. The month was then rounded out with a solid 1–1 draw at home to Charlton Athletic.

=== Winter period ===
==== November ====
Player of the Month: Joe Gelhardt
Goal of the Month: Joe Gelhardt (v Portsmouth)

Hull started November by extending their unbeaten run to six games, scraping a 2–0 win away at Norwich City thanks to goals from Gelhardt and Gyabi. However, just three days later they came unstuck, falling at the hands of Derby County in a 2–1 loss at Pride Park. Despite this, it did not take long for Jakirović's men to return to winning ways. On 8 November, the Tigers overcame Portsmouth with a 3–2 victory, highlighted by a superb winner from Gelhardt which later won the club's Goal of the Month award. As the final international break of 2025 approached, goalkeeper Pandur received his first senior call-up from Croatia for upcoming 2026 FIFA World Cup qualifiers against the Faroe Islands and Montenegro. During the break, Hull defender Ajayi missed the crucial kick in a penalty shoot-out against the DR Congo to cost Nigeria a place at the World Cup.

When domestic action eventually resumed at the end of the month, the Tigers lost back-to-back matches. A 3–2 defeat to Queens Park Rangers was soon accompanied by a 2–0 home loss to Ipswich Town, with ex-Hull loanee Chuba Akpom scoring in the latter. In the final fixture of November, an important 2–1 win away to Stoke City brought Hull back into the play-off mix, although tensions spiralled out of control at full-time. With the game decided late on through a Gelhardt winner, celebrations from Lundstram after the final whistle riled up the home supporters as well as some of the Stoke players, resulting in a brawl very similar to the one at Birmingham a month prior. The hosts were later fined £25,000, whilst Hull suffered a heavier payment of £50,000.

==== December ====
Player of the Month: Regan Slater
Goal of the Month: Mohamed Belloumi (v Sheffield Wednesday)

The Tigers were then met with a gruelling final month of 2025, with six games set to be contested before the new year. The first of these fixtures came on 5 December at home to high-flying Middlesbrough. The visitors reflected their position in the table with an immaculate first half performance, leaving Hull down 4–0 at the break. Later, the hosts' blushes were somewhat spared when Joe Gelhardt made it 4–1 from the penalty spot just after the hour mark, but no more goals came as Hull suffered their first thrashing since Blackburn won 3–0 against them at the end of August. Coincidentally, on 8 December, the Tigers were drawn at home to Blackburn in the third round of the FA Cup, with the fixture set to be played on 11 January 2026.

Five days after the Boro match, Hull beat Wrexham 2–0 at the MKM, before an away win over Millwall and another home victory, this time against West Bromwich Albion. On Christmas Eve, it was announced that the club's accounts were showing underlying losses of £41,700,000. To match the negative tone of the news, the Tigers afforded themselves a 2–2 slip-up away at relegation-bound Sheffield Wednesday on Boxing Day. However, they quickly returned to form with a 1–0 win on 29 December. That day, they rewrote the script against Middlesbrough at the Riverside Stadium, completing a defensive masterclass largely thanks to 19-year-old defender Cathal McCarthy.

==== January ====
Player of the Month: Regan Slater
Goal of the Month: Lewis Koumas ( v Blackburn Rovers)

On 2 January 2026, Matty Jacob was recalled from his loan spell at Reading. and John Egan triggered an appearance-related clause in his contract that will see him stay at Hull until the summer of 2027.
On 4 January, James Debayo signed an 18-month contract with the club on a free transfer from Leeds United.
On 8 January, Harry Vaughan Joined Bohemians on loan for the remainder of the season.
On 9 January, Tyrell Sellars-Fleming was recalled from his loan at Scunthorpe United and moved on loan for the remainder of the season to Grimsby Town.
On 16 January, Ed Devine joined Guiseley on a month-long loan spell.
On 19 January, Yū Hirakawa joined the club on loan from Bristol City for the remainder of the season.
On 22 January, Kasey Palmer joined Luton Town on loan for the remainder of the season.
On 23 January, Kieran Dowell signed permanently for Hull from Rangers on an 18-month deal.
On 28 January, Paddy McNair signed from San Diego FC on an 18-month contract with the club.
On 30 January, Toby Collyer joined on loan from Manchester United for the remainder of the season, and Lewis Koumas joined from Liverpool again on loan until the end of the season.
On 30 January, Enis Destan moved on loan to Westerlo.

==== February ====
Player of the Month: Amir Hadžiahmetović
Goal of the Month: John Egan (v Derby County)

On 2 February 2026, transfer deadline day, Joel Ndala was recalled by Manchester City.
On 3 February, Brandon Williams left the club by mutual consent.
On 5 February, goalkeeper Khiani Shombe signed an 18-month contract with the Academy arriving on a free transfer from Southampton.
On 5 February, Hugh Parker joined Carlisle United on a month-long loan spell.
On 9 February, James Furlong moved to Maribor for an undisclosed fee.
On 11 February, captain Lewie Coyle signed a new long-term contract keeping him at the club until 2029.

==== March ====
Player of the Month: Joe Gelhardt
Goal of the Month: Joe Gelhardt (v Wrexham)

==== May ====
After finishing 6th in the league season following a 2–1 win over high-flying Norwich City on matchday 46, Hull City reclaimed their 6th spot following Wrexham's 2–2 draw with Middlesbrough. Hull had been 5th or 6th for the majority of the season but dropped out of the play-off positions following a 2–1 loss to Charlton Athletic on matchday 45. In the play-off semi-finals Hull faced a Millwall team out for vengeance following being snubbed of a top 2 finish from hitting the bar against Ipswich Town in the 88th minute on matchday 42. If this goal went in, it would have been Ipswich in 2nd place not Kieran McKenna's tractor boys. The first leg was an uneventful stalemate, and a 0–2 win at The Den sent them off to Wembley. Hull City had an excellent record at Wembley winning the Championship play-off final in 2008 against Bristol City and in 2016 against Sheffield Wednesday. They were set to meet Southampton who beat Middlesbrough, the first leg finished 0–0, while the second leg ended 2–1 to Southampton and also 2–1 on aggregate, sending Southampton through to the final. But following the whole 'Spygate' shenanigans, Southamption were disqualified and Middlesbrough were reinstated into the final. Hull threatened to take legal action if they lost this final as they had to change their training regime midway through due to facing a different opponent but it did not matter anyway as they prevailed with a 95th minute Oli McBurnie winner taking his tally to 19 goals and 7 assists for the season for the former Las Palmas man and Scottish international who had just been snubbed for the World Cup the day prior.

== Coaching staff ==
Position	Name
Head Coach	(Bosnia and Herzegovina) Sergej Jakirović
Assistant Head Coach	(England) Dean Holden
Assistant Head Coach	(Croatia) Marko Salatović
Fitness Coach	(Croatia) Marin Ivančić
Goalkeeping Coach	(England) Erbil Bozkurt
Head of Analysis	(Croatia) Anđelo Roguljić
Head of Player Development	(England) Andy Dawson

Source: Hull City A.F.C.

== Squad ==
No.	Player	Position	Nationality	Place of birth	Date of birth (age) (Note: Players' ages listed as they were on 1 July 2025, the official start date of the 2025–26 season)	Previous club	Date signed	Fee	Contract end
Goalkeepers
1	Ivor Pandur	GK	(Croatia)	Rijeka	25 March 2000 (age 25)	(Netherlands) Fortuna Sittard	20 January 2024	€2,000,000	30 June 2027
12	Dillon Phillips	GK	(England)	Hornchurch	11 June 1995 (age 30)	Rotherham United	1 July 2025	Free	30 June 2027
Defenders
2	Lewie Coyle (c)	RB	(England)	Hull	15 October 1995 (age 29)	Fleetwood Town	7 August 2020	£350,000	30 June 2026
3	Ryan Giles	LB	(England)	Telford	26 January 2000 (age 25)	Luton Town	27 June 2024	£4,000,000	30 June 2027
4	Charlie Hughes (vc)	CB	(England)	Golborne	16 October 2003 (age 21)	Wigan Athletic	16 August 2024	£3,500,000	30 June 2028
6	Semi Ajayi	CB	(Nigeria)	(England) Crayford	9 November 1993 (age 31)	West Bromwich Albion	1 July 2025	Free	30 June 2027
15	John Egan	CB	(Republic of Ireland)	Cork	20 October 1992 (age 32)	Burnley	3 February 2025	£250,000	30 June 2026
16	Matty Jacob	LB	(England)	Barnsley	3 June 2001 (age 24)	Academy	17 May 2019	–	30 June 2027
18	Cody Drameh	RB	(England)	Dulwich	8 December 2001 (age 23)	Leeds United	23 July 2024	Free	30 June 2027
23	Akin Famewo	CB	(England)	Lewisham	9 November 1998 (age 26)	Sheffield Wednesday	29 July 2025	Free	30 June 2027
29	James Furlong	LB	(Republic of Ireland)	Dublin	7 June 2002 (age 23)	Brighton & Hove Albion	1 September 2023	Undisclosed	30 June 2026
30	Brandon Williams	LB	(England)	Manchester	3 September 2000 (age 24)	Manchester United	15 August 2025	Free	30 June 2026
37	Paddy McNair	CB	(Northern Ireland)	Ballyclare	27 April 1995 (age 30)	(United States) San Diego	28 January 2026	Free	30 June 2027
58	Cathal McCarthy	CB	(Republic of Ireland)	Caragh	31 August 2006 (age 18)	(Republic of Ireland) UCD	1 February 2025	£250,000	30 June 2027
Midfielders
5	John Lundstram	DM	(England)	Liverpool	18 February 1994 (age 31)	(Turkey) Trabzonspor	31 July 2025	Loan	30 June 2026
8	Eliot Matazo	DM	(Belgium)	Woluwe-Saint-Lambert	15 February 2002 (age 23)	Monaco	24 January 2025	€2,000,000	30 June 2028
14	Harry Vaughan	AM	(Republic of Ireland)	(England) Trafford	6 April 2004 (age 21)	Oldham Athletic	31 January 2023	Youth Fee	30 June 2026
20	Amir Hadžiahmetović	CM	(Bosnia and Herzegovina)	(Denmark) Nexø	8 March 1997 (age 28)	(Turkey) Beşiktaş	1 September 2025	Loan	30 June 2026
24	Darko Gyabi	CM	(England)	Catford	18 February 2004 (age 21)	Leeds United	1 September 2025	Free	30 June 2028
25	Matt Crooks	CM	(England)	Leeds	20 January 1994 (age 31)	(United States) Real Salt Lake	10 January 2025	£1,500,000	30 June 2027
26	Kieran Dowell	CM	(England)	Ormskirk	10 October 1997 (age 27)	(Scotland) Rangers	23 January 2026	Free	30 June 2027
27	Regan Slater	CM	(England)	Gleadless	11 September 1999 (age 25)	Sheffield United	27 January 2022	£50,000	30 June 2026
33	Toby Collyer	DM	(England)	Worthing	3 January 2004 (age 21)	Manchester United	30 January 2026	Loan	30 June 2026
Forwards
7	Liam Millar	LW	(Canada)	Toronto	27 September 1999 (age 25)	(Switzerland) Basel	9 August 2024	€3,500,000	30 June 2027
9	Oli McBurnie	CF	(Scotland)	(England) Leeds	4 June 1996 (age 29)	(Spain) Las Palmas	6 August 2025	Free	30 June 2028
10	Mohamed Belloumi	RW	(Algeria)	Mascara	1 June 2002 (age 23)	(Portugal) Farense	30 August 2024	€5,000,000	30 June 2028
11	David Akintola	RW	(Nigeria)	Oyo	13 January 1996 (age 29)	(Turkey) Çaykur Rizespor	15 August 2025	Free	30 June 2027
13	Yū Hirakawa	RW	(Japan)	Kashima	3 January 2001 (age 24)	Bristol City	19 January 2026	Loan	30 June 2026
19	Joel Ndala	LW	(England)	Manchester	31 May 2006 (age 19)	Manchester City	29 July 2025	Loan	30 June 2026
21	Joe Gelhardt	CF	(England)	Liverpool	4 May 2002 (age 23)	Leeds United	9 August 2025	Loan	30 June 2026
22	Kyle Joseph	CF	(Scotland)	(England) Chipping Barnet	10 September 2001 (age 23)	Blackpool	20 January 2025	£2,500,000	30 June 2028
36	Lewis Koumas	LW	(Wales)	(England) Chester	19 September 2005 (age 19)	Liverpool	30 January 2026	Loan	30 June 2026
39	Enis Destan	CF	(Turkey)	Konak	15 June 2002 (age 23)	(Turkey) Trabzonspor	1 August 2025	Free	30 June 2028
41	Tyrell Sellars-Fleming	CF	(England)	Lincoln	31 May 2005 (age 20)	Scunthorpe United	21 August 2023	£150,000	30 June 2027
Out on loan
17	Abu Kamara (Note: On loan at Getafe)	RW	(England)	Lambeth	21 July 2003 (age 21)	Norwich City	30 August 2024	£4,500,000	30 June 2028
32	Thimothée Lo-Tutala (Note: On loan at Doncaster Rovers)	GK	(France)	Gonesse	13 February 2003 (age 22)	Tottenham Hotspur	6 April 2023	Free	30 June 2028
34	Harvey Cartwright (Note: On loan at Hartlepool United)	GK	(England)	Grimsby	9 May 2002 (age 23)	Academy	1 July 2019	–	30 June 2026
45	Kasey Palmer (Note: On loan at Luton Town)	AM	(Jamaica)	(England) Lewisham	9 November 1996 (age 28)	Coventry City	30 August 2024	£1,250,000	30 June 2027
–	Mason Burstow (Note: On loan at Bolton Wanderers)	CF	(England)	Greenwich	4 August 2003 (age 21)	Chelsea	16 August 2024	£2,000,000	30 June 2028
–	Abdülkadir Ömür (Note: On loan at Antalyaspor)	AM	(Turkey)	Trabzon	25 June 1999 (age 26)	(Turkey) Trabzonspor	1 February 2024	€2,500,000	30 June 2027

Source: Hull City A.F.C.

== Transfers and contracts ==
=== Transfers in ===
Date	Pos.	Player	From	Fee	Ref.
19 April 2025 (Note: Deal was made official on 1 July 2025, the official start date of the 2025–26 season)	CM	(Colombia) Gustavo Puerta (Note: Deal was eventually annulled following the club's transfer embargo)	(Germany) Bayer Leverkusen	£3,200,000	
12 June 2025	CM	(Morocco) Reda Laalaoui	(Morocco) FUS Rabat	£400,000	
16 June 2025	GK	(England) Dillon Phillips	(England) Rotherham United	Free	
19 June 2025	CB	(Nigeria) Semi Ajayi	(England) West Bromwich Albion	Free	
29 July 2025	CB	(England) Akin Famewo	(England) Sheffield Wednesday	Free	
31 July 2025	CF	(Kenya) Sammy Henia-Kamau (Note: Youth player)	(Wales) Swansea City	Free	
1 August 2025	CF	(Turkey) Enis Destan	(Turkey) Trabzonspor	Free	
6 August 2025	CF	(Scotland) Oli McBurnie	(Spain) Las Palmas	Free	
15 August 2025	RW	(Nigeria) David Akintola	(Turkey) Çaykur Rizespor	Free	
15 August 2025	LB	(England) Brandon Williams	(England) Manchester United	Free	
1 September 2025	CM	(England) Darko Gyabi	(England) Leeds United	Free	
11 September 2025	RW	(Brazil) João Mendes	(England) Burnley	Free	
4 January 2026	CB	(England) James Debayo	(England) Leeds United	Free	
23 January 2026	FW	(England) Kieran Dowell	(Scotland) Rangers	Undisclosed	
28 January 2026	CB	(Northern Ireland) Paddy McNair	(United States) San Diego FC	Undisclosed	
5 February 2026	GK	(England) Khiani Shombe	(England) Southampton	Free	

Expenditure: ▼ ≈ £3,600,000 (all fees converted into GBP)

=== Transfers out ===
Date	Pos.	Player	To	Fee	Ref.
12 June 2025	DM	(England) Xavier Simons	(England) Bolton Wanderers	£300,000	
25 June 2025	GK	(Switzerland) Anthony Racioppi	(Switzerland) Sion	Undisclosed	
25 June 2025	CB	(England) Andy Smith	(England) Gillingham	Undisclosed	
8 July 2025	AM	(Germany) Marvin Mehlem	(Germany) Arminia Bielefeld	Undisclosed	
19 July 2025	CB	(Republic of Ireland) Sean McLoughlin	(England) Blackburn Rovers	£500,000	
25 July 2025	CB	(Canada) Alfie Jones	(England) Middlesbrough	£3,000,000	
4 August 2025	CM	(Colombia) Steven Alzate	(United States) Atlanta United	£1,750,000	
9 February 2026	LB	(Republic of Ireland) James Furlong	(Slovenia) Maribor	Undisclosed	
22 February 2026	LB	(England) Zane Myers	(Republic of Ireland) Bohemian	Free Transfer	

Income: ▲ ≈ £5,550,000 (all fees converted into GBP)

=== Loans in ===
Date	Pos.	Player	From	Date until	Ref.
29 July 2025	LW	(England) Joel Ndala	(England) Manchester City	2 February 2026	
31 July 2025	CM	(England) John Lundstram	(Turkey) Trabzonspor	30 June 2026	
9 August 2025	CF	(England) Joe Gelhardt	(England) Leeds United	30 June 2026	
1 September 2025	CM	(Bosnia and Herzegovina) Amir Hadžiahmetović	(Turkey) Beşiktaş	30 June 2026	
19 January 2026	RW	(Japan) Yū Hirakawa	(England) Bristol City	30 June 2026	
30 January 2026	DM	(England) Toby Collyer	(England) Manchester United	30 June 2026	
30 January 2026	LW	(Wales) Lewis Koumas	(England) Liverpool	30 June 2026	

=== Loans out ===
Date	Pos.	Player	To	Date until	Ref.
16 June 2025	GK	(France) Thimothée Lo-Tutala	(England) Doncaster Rovers	31 May 2026	
4 July 2025	LB	(England) Matty Jacob	(England) Reading	2 January 2026 (Note: On 2 January, Jacob was recalled back from his loan at Reading)	
8 July 2025	CM	(England) Rocco Coyle	(England) Boston United	14 November 2025 (Note: On 14 November, Coyle was recalled back from his loan at Boston and subsequently joined Scarborough on loan)	
26 July 2025	AM	(Turkey) Abdülkadir Ömür	(Turkey) Antalyaspor	31 May 2026	
28 July 2025	CF	(England) Mason Burstow	(England) Bolton Wanderers	31 May 2026	
7 August 2025	GK	(England) Harvey Cartwright	(England) Hartlepool United	3 October 2025 (Note: Loan was initially supposed to last until 31 May, however Cartwright was recalled early due to sustaining an injury)	
1 September 2025	RW	(England) Abu Kamara	(Spain) Getafe	31 May 2026	
16 September 2025	CF	(England) Tyrell Sellars-Fleming	(England) Scunthorpe United	9 January 2026 (Note: Loan was initially supposed to last until 16 October, however it was later extended until 31 January, before being cut short on 9 January.)	
19 September 2025	LB	(England) Zane Myers	(England) Scarborough Athletic	18 October 2025	
27 September 2025	CB	(England) Harry Revill	(England) Salisbury	25 October 2025	
7 November 2025	CF	(France) George Akinniranye	(England) Beverley Town	6 December 2025	
7 November 2025	CF	(Wales) Zac Jagielka	(England) Stocksbridge Park Steels	6 December 2025	
14 November 2025	CM	(England) Rocco Coyle	(England) Scarborough Athletic	13 December 2025	
15 November 2025	AM	(England) Pharrell Brown	(England) Hartlepool United	13 December 2025	
22 November 2025	RB	(England) Noah Wadsworth	(England) Scarborough Athletic	20 December 2025	
13 December 2025	CF	(England) Albert Matique	(England) Beverley Town	10 January 2026	
13 December 2025	CB	(England) Harry Revill	(England) Cray Wanderers	10 January 2026	
20 December 2025	CB	(England) Bobby Moore	(England) Guiseley	17 January 2026	
8 January 2026	AM	(Republic of Ireland) Harry Vaughan	(Republic of Ireland) Bohemians	30 June 2026	
9 January 2026	CF	(England) Tyrell Sellars-Fleming	(England) Grimsby Town	31 May 2026	
16 January 2026	LB	(England) Ed Devine	(England) Guiseley	14 February 2026	
22 January 2026	AM	(Jamaica) Kasey Palmer	(England) Luton Town	31 May 2026	
23 January 2026	CF	(England) Jack Topley	(England) Dorchester Town	Work Experience	
30 January 2026	CF	(Turkey) Enis Destan	(Belgium) Westerlo	31 May 2026	
5 February 2026	CF	(Republic of Ireland) Hugh Parker	(England) Carlisle United	31 May 2026	
12 February 2026	CB	(Nigeria) Calvin Okike	(England) Hartlepool United	13 April 2026	
7 March 2026	AM	(Albania) Aidon Shehu	(England) Scarborough Athletic	6 April 2026	

=== Released / Out of contract ===
Date	Pos.	Player	Subsequent club	Join date	Ref.
17 May 2025	RW	(Morocco) Nordin Amrabat	(Morocco) Wydad Casablanca	1 June 2025 (Note: The 2025 FIFA Club World Cup impacted Amrabat's transfer to Wydad. The 2025 summer transfer window was brought forward for an initial 10 days, running from 1 to 10 June (it would eventually re-open as normal on 16 June until 1 September), to allow clubs playing at the tournament (and other clubs within their respective member associations) to officially register new players before the competition began. Therefore, Amrabat's transfer, which was announced on 25 May, was able to be made official on 1 June, instead of 1 July as all other Bosman deals usually are.)	
19 June 2025	CF	(Italy) João Pedro	(Mexico) Atlético San Luis	24 June 2025	
30 June 2025	GK	(England) Owen Foster	(England) Middlesbrough	1 July 2025	
30 June 2025	LB	(England) Jake Leake	(England) Oldham Athletic	1 July 2025	
30 June 2025	CB	(England) Alfie Taylor	(England) Grimsby Borough	7 July 2025	
30 June 2025	CB	(England) Paul Iggulden	(England) Stocksbridge Park Steels	8 July 2025	
30 June 2025	CM	(England) Lucas Dawson	(United States) Missouri State Bears	10 July 2025	
30 June 2025	CM	(Wales) Callum Jones	(Scotland) Dundee	15 July 2025	
30 June 2025	LB	(England) Brandon Fleming	(Northern Ireland) Derry City	17 July 2025	
30 June 2025	CB	(England) Jack Leckie	(England) Alfreton Town	24 July 2025	
30 June 2025	CM	(England) Cameron Gray	(United States) North Florida Ospreys	25 July 2025	
30 June 2025	LW	(Turkey) Doğukan Sinik	(Turkey) Antalyaspor	26 July 2025	
30 June 2025	CB	(Republic of Ireland) Jevon Mills	(England) FC Halifax Town	9 August 2025	
30 June 2025	RB	(England) Joe Batty	(England) Boston United	14 August 2025	
30 June 2025	CF	(England) Aidan Durkan	(England) Boston United	14 August 2025	
30 June 2025	DM	(England) Alfie Perry	(England) Boston United	14 August 2025	
30 June 2025	AM	(England) Brandon Harriman-Annous	(England) Berkhamsted	11 September 2025	
30 June 2025	CB	(England) Kyle Fanning	(England) Ossett United	18 September 2025	
30 June 2025	GK	(England) Shea Callister	(England) Maghull	October 2025	
30 June 2025	RW	(England) Jaedyn Chibanga	TBA	TBA	
30 June 2025	AM	(Bermuda) Sincere Hall	TBA	TBA	
30 June 2025	GK	(England) George Wilson	TBA	TBA	
3 February 2026	LB	(England) Brandon Williams	TBA	TBA	

=== New contracts ===
Date	Pos.	Player	End date	Ref.
17 May 2025	CF	(Italy) João Pedro	30 June 2026	
17 September 2025	LB	(England) Zane Myers	30 June 2026	
17 September 2025	RB	(England) Noah Wadsworth	30 June 2026	
2 January 2026	CB	(Republic of Ireland) John Egan	30 June 2027	
9 February 2026	CF	(England) Ramell Carter	30 June 2028 (Note: First professional contract) (Note: Club option of an extra year)	
9 February 2026	CB	(England) Bobby Moore	30 June 2028	
9 February 2026	CM	(England) Josh Ocaya	30 June 2028	
11 February 2026	RB	(England) Lewie Coyle	30 June 2029	
7 March 2026	CM	(England) Regan Slater	30 June 2027	

== Pre-season and friendlies ==
On 5 June 2025, Hull announced their first friendlies of pre-season, with games at the end of July against League One side Stockport County and Premier League returners Sunderland. Prior to those matches, pre-season got underway with two unannounced, behind-closed-doors fixtures at the club's training ground. A 2–0 loss to Lincoln City was swiftly followed by a 1–0 win over Humber derby rivals Grimsby Town. In the middle of July, Hull embarked on a pre-season training camp in Turkey. Whilst there, the Tigers stretched their winning streak further with victories against İstanbulspor and Kasımpaşa. Upon their return, they duly beat both Stockport and Sunderland, before playing out a goalless draw with La Liga side Getafe on 2 August.

Win Draw Loss Fixtures

5 July 2025 Friendly	Hull City	0–2	Lincoln City	Cottingham
15:00 BST		Report	Collins 15'; Makama 85'	Stadium: Cottingham Training Ground; Attendance: 0 (BCD)

12 July 2025 Friendly	Hull City	1–0	Grimsby Town	Cottingham
15:00 BST	Sellars-Fleming 76'	Report		Stadium: Cottingham Training Ground; Attendance: 0 (BCD)

15 July 2025 Friendly	İstanbulspor	1–2	Hull City	Riva
18:00 EEST	Sol 45'; Cham (yellow card) 79'	Report	Joseph 67'; Tinsdale (yellow card) 72'; Brown 90'	Stadium: TFF Riva Facility; Attendance: Unknown

19 July 2025 Friendly	Kasımpaşa	0–1	Hull City	Kemerburgaz
18:00 EEST		Report	Sellars-Fleming 70'	Stadium: Kasımpaşa Training Facility; Attendance: Unknown

26 July 2025 Friendly	Stockport County	0–1	Hull City	Stockport
15:00 BST		Report	Burstow 75'	Stadium: Edgeley Park; Attendance: 3,829

29 July 2025 Friendly	Hull City	2–1	Sunderland	Hull
19:45 BST	Tinsdale 17'; Kamara 71'	Report	Adingra 11'	Stadium: MKM Stadium; Attendance: 6,258

2 August 2025 Friendly	Hull City	0–0	Getafe	Hull
16:00 BST		Report		Stadium: MKM Stadium; Attendance: 3,918

== Competitions ==
=== Overall record ===
Competition	First match	Last match	Starting round	Final position	Record							
Competition	First match	Last match	Starting round	Final position	Pld	W	D	L	GF	GA	GD	Win %
Championship	9 August 2025	2 May 2026	Matchday 1	6th	46	21	10	15	70	66	+4	45.65
Championship play-offs	8 May 2026	23 May 2026	Semi-finals	Winners	3	2	1	0	3	0	+3	66.67
FA Cup	11 January 2026	13 February 2026	Third round	Fourth round	2	0	1	1	0	4	−4	0.00
EFL Cup	12 August 2025		First round	First round	1	0	1	0	3	3	+0	0.00
Total					52	23	13	16	76	73	+3	44.23

Source: Soccerway

=== EFL Championship ===
On 26 June 2025, the fixtures for the EFL Championship season were announced. Hull were drawn away at Coventry City on the opening day, and at home to Norwich City on the final day.

==== League table ====
Pos	Team	Pld	W	D	L	GF	GA	GD	Pts	Promotion, qualification or relegation
4	Southampton (Note: Southampton qualified for the play-offs and defeated Middlesbrough to qualify for the final, but were subsequently disqualified for multiple breaches of EFL regulations related to the unauthorised filming of other clubs' training, with Middlesbrough taking their place in the play-off final.) (D)	46	22	14	10	82	56	+26	80	Qualification for the Championship play-offs
5	Middlesbrough	46	22	14	10	72	47	+25	80	Qualification for the Championship play-offs
6	Hull City (O, P)	46	21	10	15	70	66	+4	73	Qualification for the Championship play-offs
7	Wrexham	46	19	14	13	69	65	+4	71	
8	Derby County	46	20	9	17	67	59	+8	69	

Source: EFL Official Website
Rules for classification: 1) Points; 2) Goal difference; 3) Number of goals scored; 4) Head-to-head results; 5) Wins; 6) Away goals; 7) Penalty points (sec 9.5); 8) Number of 12-point sending off offences; 9) Play-off (only if needed to determine promotion/relegation)
(D) Disqualified; (O) Play-off winners; (P) Promoted

==== Results summary ====
Overall								Home						Away					
Pld	W	D	L	GF	GA	GD	Pts	W	D	L	GF	GA	GD	W	D	L	GF	GA	GD
46	21	10	15	70	66	+4	73	11	5	7	35	34	+1	10	5	8	35	32	+3

Source: Soccerway

==== Results by round ====
Round	1	2	3	4	5	6	7	8	9	10	11	12	13	14	15	16	17	18	19	20	21	22	23	24	25	27	28	29	30	26^{1}	31	33	34	35	32^{2}	36	37	38	39	40	41	42	43	44	45	46
Ground	A	H	H	A	A	H	A	H	H	A	H	H	A	A	H	A	H	A	H	H	A	H	A	A	H	A	A	H	A	H	H	H	H	A	A	H	A	A	H	A	H	A	H	A	A	H
Result	D	W	L	L	D	W	L	D	W	W	W	D	W	L	W	L	L	W	L	W	W	W	D	W	L	W	W	W	W	D	L	L	W	W	L	L	W	L	W	D	D	L	D	D	L	W
Position	15	9	15	17	20	14	18	18	15	10	7	8	7	8	5	6	11	7	9	6	6	4	4	4	5	5	4	4	3	3	4	5	4	5	5	5	5	5	5	5	5	6	6	7	7	6
Points	1	4	4	4	5	8	8	9	12	15	18	19	22	22	25	25	25	28	28	31	34	37	38	41	41	44	47	50	53	54	54	54	57	60	60	60	63	63	66	67	68	68	69	70	70	73

Source: Soccerway
A = Away; H = Home; W = Win; D = Draw; L = Loss; P = Postponed
Notes:
- ^{1} Matchday 26 (vs. Watford) was postponed due to player safety concerns.
- ^{2} Matchday 32 (vs. Ipswich Town) was postponed due to both clubs progression in the FA Cup.

==== Matches ====
Win Draw Loss Fixtures

9 August 2025 1	Coventry City	0–0	Hull City	Coventry
12:30 BST	van Ewijk (yellow card) 57'; Dasilva (yellow card) 65'; Rushworth (yellow card) 90+1'	Report	Slater (yellow card) 66'; Crooks (yellow card) 90+1'; McBurnie (yellow card) 90+1'	Stadium: Coventry Building Society Arena; Attendance: 29,052; Referee: Bobby Madley

17 August 2025 2	Hull City	3–2	Oxford United	Kingston upon Hull
15:00 BST	Gelhardt 2'; Crooks 20', (yellow card) 27'; McBurnie 90+3'	Report	Lankshear 9'; Spencer (yellow card) 12'; Brannagan 26'	Stadium: MKM Stadium; Attendance: 20,667; Referee: Andrew Kitchen
Note: Initially scheduled for 16 August, but was moved to accommodate a Hull F.C. fixture.

23 August 2025 3	Hull City	0–3	Blackburn Rovers	Kingston upon Hull
12:30 BST	Slater (yellow card) 12'; Lundstram (yellow card) 37'; McBurnie (yellow card) 90+6'	Report	Hedges 18'; Tavares (yellow card) 43'; Ōhashi 47'; Cantwell 50'; Henriksson (yellow card) 85'; McLoughlin (yellow card) 90+6'	Stadium: MKM Stadium; Attendance: 20,518; Referee: Tom Nield
Note: Initially scheduled for a 15:00 kick-off, but was moved for live Sky Sports broadcasting.

30 August 2025 4	Bristol City	4–2	Hull City	Bristol
15:00 BST	Riis 18', 42'; Mehmeti 32'; Bird 78'; Knight (yellow card) 89'	Report	Gelhardt 3'; Akintola (yellow card) 52'; Joseph 90+3'	Stadium: Ashton Gate; Attendance: 21,385; Referee: Gavin Ward

13 September 2025 5	Swansea City	2–2	Hull City	Swansea
15:00 BST	Vipotnik 40'; Tymon (yellow card) 52'; Ronald 57'	Report	McBurnie 45'; Hughes (yellow card) 88'; Egan 90+7'	Stadium: Swansea.com Stadium; Attendance: 15,152; Referee: David Webb

20 September 2025 6	Hull City	3–1	Southampton	Kingston upon Hull
15:00 BST	Lundstram (yellow card) 15', (goal) 59'; Joseph 22'; Giles (yellow card) 55'; McBurnie 70'; Destan (yellow card) 85'; Slater (yellow card) 87'; Pandur (yellow card) 90+2'	Report	Harwood-Bellis (yellow card) 70'; Stephens (yellow card) 85'; Stewart (yellow card) 90+4'; Armstrong 90+5'	Stadium: MKM Stadium; Attendance: 22,085; Referee: Anthony Backhouse

27 September 2025 7	Watford	2–1	Hull City	Watford
15:00 BST	Semedo (yellow card) 23', (goal) 78'; Louza 60'	Report	Lundstram (yellow card) 12'; McBurnie 25'; Giles (yellow card) 30'; Drameh (yellow card) 50'; Coyle (yellow card) 90+2'; Akintola (yellow card) 90+4'	Stadium: Vicarage Road; Attendance: 17,973; Referee: Oliver Langford

30 September 2025 8	Hull City	2–2	Preston North End	Kingston upon Hull
19:45 BST	McBurnie 48', 74'	Report	Small 3'; Smith 10'; Lindsay (yellow card) 51'	Stadium: MKM Stadium; Attendance: 18,624; Referee: Josh Smith

4 October 2025 9	Hull City	1–0	Sheffield United	Kingston upon Hull
12:30 BST	Akintola 30'; McBurnie (yellow card) 60'; Egan (yellow card) 88'	Report	O'Hare (yellow card) 46'; McGuinness (yellow card) 60'; Burrows (penalty missed) 88'	Stadium: MKM Stadium; Attendance: 21,030; Referee: Gavin Ward
Note: Fixture was originally scheduled for a 15:00 kick-off, but was moved for live Sky Sports broadcasting.

18 October 2025 10	Birmingham City	2–3	Hull City	Birmingham
15:00 BST	Stansfield 27', (yellow card) 45', (goal) 90+6' (pen.); Beadle (yellow card) 54'; Robinson (yellow card) 59' (yellow-red card) 59'	Report	Robinson 11' (o.g.); Coyle (yellow card) 16'; Akintola (yellow card) 20'; Gelhardt (yellow card) 45', (goal) 90+3'; Slater 45+4'; Crooks (yellow card) 68'; Pandur (yellow card) 76'; Egan (yellow card) 83'; Destan (yellow card) 90+8'	Stadium: St Andrew's; Attendance: 27,215; Referee: Ruebyn Ricardo

21 October 2025 11	Hull City	2–1	Leicester City	Kingston upon Hull
19:45 BST	Millar 6'; Gelhardt 31', (yellow card) 52'	Report	Ramsey 67'; Thomas (yellow card) 73'; Choudhury (yellow card) 90+8'	Stadium: MKM Stadium; Attendance: 20,211; Referee: Matt Donohue

25 October 2025 12	Hull City	1–1	Charlton Athletic	Kingston upon Hull
15:00 BST	Hughes (yellow card) 44'; Gelhardt 46'; Joseph (yellow card) 55'	Report	Berry 90+1'; Kelman (yellow card) 90+4'	Stadium: MKM Stadium; Attendance: 20,804; Referee: Andrew Kitchen

1 November 2025 13	Norwich City	0–2	Hull City	Norwich
12:30 GMT	Schlupp (yellow card) 28'	Report	Gelhardt 49'; Crooks (yellow card) 74'; Joseph (yellow card) 78'; Gyabi 87'	Stadium: Carrow Road; Attendance: 25,724; Referee: Josh Smith
Note: Fixture was originally scheduled for a 15:00 kick-off, but was moved for live Sky Sports broadcasting.

4 November 2025 14	Derby County	2–1	Hull City	Derby
19:45 GMT	Morris 27'; Salvesen 83', (yellow card) 85'	Report	Ndala 50'	Stadium: Pride Park Stadium; Attendance: 26,391; Referee: Stephen Martin

8 November 2025 15	Hull City	3–2	Portsmouth	Kingston upon Hull
12:30 GMT	Destan 27'; Joseph 42'; Gelhardt 79'; Pandur (yellow card) 90+8'	Report	Devlin 16', 45+2', (yellow card) 62'; Williams (yellow card) 76'; Pack (yellow card) 82'	Stadium: MKM Stadium; Attendance: 23,205; Referee: Tom Nield
Note: Fixture was originally scheduled for a 15:00 kick-off, but was moved for live Sky Sports broadcasting.

22 November 2025 16	Queens Park Rangers	3–2	Hull City	Shepherd's Bush
15:00 GMT	Chair 38'; Dunne 55'; Burrell 66'	Report	Gelhardt 17'; Destan 51'; Crooks (yellow card) 90+3'	Stadium: Loftus Road; Attendance: 16,657; Referee: James Linington

25 November 2025 17	Hull City	0–2	Ipswich Town	Kingston upon Hull
19:45 GMT	Gelhardt (yellow card) 31'; Giles (yellow card) 52'	Report	Cajuste (yellow card) 22'; Núñez 69'; Akpom 73'; Greaves (yellow card) 89'	Stadium: MKM Stadium; Attendance: 21,271; Referee: Lewis Smith

29 November 2025 18	Stoke City	1–2	Hull City	Stoke-on-Trent
12:30 GMT	Thomas 17'; Lawal (yellow card) 90+6'; Phillips (yellow card) 90+8'	Report	Ajayi 48'; Destan (yellow card) 76'; Gelhardt 90'; Crooks (yellow card) 90+6'; Lundstram (yellow card) 90+8'; Joseph (yellow card) 90+8'	Stadium: Bet365 Stadium; Attendance: 22,331; Referee: Josh Smith
Note: Fixture was originally scheduled for a 15:00 kick-off, but was moved for live Sky Sports broadcasting.

5 December 2025 19	Hull City	1–4	Middlesbrough	Kingston upon Hull
20:00 GMT	Slater (yellow card) 58'; Gelhardt 62' (pen.)	Report	Strelec 9'; Gilbert 32'; Whittaker 35'; McGree 44'	Stadium: MKM Stadium; Attendance: 21,105; Referee: Dean Whitestone
Note: Fixture was originally scheduled for 6 December, but was moved for live Sky Sports broadcasting.

10 December 2025 20	Hull City	2–0	Wrexham	Kingston upon Hull
20:00 GMT	Joseph 10'; McBurnie 67'	Report	Moore (penalty missed) 56'; Dobson (yellow card) 57'	Stadium: MKM Stadium; Attendance: 19,464; Referee: Andrew Kitchen
Note: Fixture was originally scheduled for a 19:45 kick-off, but was moved for live Sky Sports broadcasting.

13 December 2025 21	Millwall	1–3	Hull City	Bermondsey
15:00 GMT	Emakhu 80'; Azeez (red card) 76'	Report	Joseph 6', 13'; Millar (yellow card) 57'; Coyle (yellow card) 71'; McBurnie 88'; Giles (yellow card) 90+1'	Stadium: The Den; Attendance: 16,419; Referee: Gavin Ward

20 December 2025 22	Hull City	1–0	West Bromwich Albion	Kingston upon Hull
15:00 GMT	Belloumi (yellow card) 45+4'; McBurnie 45+7'; Crooks (yellow card) 55'; Giles (yellow card) 82'; Pandur (yellow card) 90+2'	Report	Taylor (yellow card) 28'; Campbell (yellow card) 50'; Gilchrist (red card) 75'; Styles (yellow card) 80'; Mepham (yellow card) 90+5'	Stadium: MKM Stadium; Attendance: 21,218; Referee: Ruebyn Ricardo

26 December 2025 23	Sheffield Wednesday	2–2	Hull City	Sheffield
15:00 GMT	Ingelsson 21'; Cadamarteri 60'; J. Lowe (yellow card) 76'; Bannan (yellow card) 90+8'	Report	Egan (yellow card) 28'; Crooks (yellow card) 35', (goal) 65'; McBurnie (yellow card) 46'; Belloumi 37'; Destan (yellow card) 87'	Stadium: Hillsborough Stadium; Attendance: 27,929; Referee: Stephen Martin

29 December 2025 24	Middlesbrough	0–1	Hull City	Middlesbrough
19:45 GMT	Ayling (yellow card) 76'; Hansen (yellow card) 78'	Report	Gyabi 12'; McCarthy (yellow card) 15'; Akintola (yellow card) 30'; Egan (yellow card) 58'; Joseph (yellow card) 64'	Stadium: Riverside Stadium; Attendance: 31,421; Referee: Leigh Doughty

1 January 2026 25	Hull City	0–1	Stoke City	Kingston upon Hull
15:00 GMT	Crooks (yellow card) 22'; Slater (yellow card) 45+1'; Ndala (yellow card) 82'	Report	Boženík 39'; Bae Jun-ho (yellow card) 69'; Talovierov (yellow card) 90+4'	Stadium: MKM Stadium; Attendance: 23,152; Referee: Craig Pawson

17 January 2026 27	Southampton	1–2	Hull City	Southampton
15:00 GMT	Stewart 71'	Report	Joseph 20'; Hughes 34', (yellow card) 45+1'; Coyle (yellow card) 38'	Stadium: St Mary's Stadium; Attendance: 27,117; Referee: Sam Allison

20 January 2026 28	Preston North End	0–3	Hull City	Preston
19:45 GMT	Offiah (yellow card) 45+2'; Lewis (yellow card) 57'; Osmajić (red card) 90+5'	Report	Millar 33'; Famewo 45'; McBurnie 49'; Coyle (yellow card) 51'; Egan (yellow card) 59'; Lundstram (yellow card) 90+8'	Stadium: Deepdale; Attendance: 14,174; Referee: Stephen Martin

24 January 2026 29	Hull City	2–1	Swansea City	Kingston upon Hull
15:00 GMT	McBurnie 24' (pen.); Famewo (yellow card) 32'; Slater 39'; Millar (yellow card) 48'; Dowell (yellow card) 90+4'	Report	Burgess (yellow card) 22'; Cullen 59'; Key (yellow card) 70'	Stadium: MKM Stadium; Attendance: 21,912; Referee: Josh Smith

31 January 2026 30	Blackburn Rovers	0–1	Hull City	Blackburn
15:00 GMT	Cantwell (yellow card) 37'; McLoughlin (yellow card) 82'	Report	Koumas 81'	Stadium: Ewood Park; Attendance: 13,769; Referee: Thomas Bramall

3 February 2026 26	Hull City	0–0	Watford	Kingston upon Hull
19:45 GMT	Coyle (yellow card) 73'; Giles (yellow card) 79'; Lundstram (yellow card) 82'; McBurnie (yellow card) 87'	Report	Ngakia (yellow card) 45+1'; Doumbia (yellow card) 72'	Stadium: MKM Stadium; Attendance: 20,441; Referee: Leigh Doughty
Note: Fixture was originally scheduled for 4 January, but it was postponed due to player safety concerns.

7 February 2026 31	Hull City	2–3	Bristol City	Kingston upon Hull
15:01 GMT	McBurnie 24'; Dowell 78'; Collyer (yellow card) 81'; Slater (yellow card) 87'	Report	Atkinson 33'; McCrorie 39'; Riis 50'	Stadium: MKM Stadium; Attendance: 20,848; Referee: Oliver Langford
Note: All EFL matches kick-off one minute late as part of awareness of Every Minute Matters campaign.

21 February 2026 33	Hull City	1–3	Queens Park Rangers	Kingston upon Hull
12:30 GMT	Slater (yellow card) 37'; Gelhardt 39'; Millar (yellow card) 44'; McNair (yellow card) 74'	Report	McNair 21' (o.g.); Edwards (yellow card) 45+1'; Bennie 84'; Kone 90+5'	Stadium: MKM Stadium; Attendance: 21,928; Referee: Andrew Madley
Note: Fixture was initially scheduled for a 15:00 kick-off, but was rescheduled for live Sky Sports broadcasting.

24 February 2026 34	Hull City	4–2	Derby County	Kingston upon Hull
19:45 GMT	Elder 9' (o.g.); McBurnie 39'; Coyle (yellow card) 60'; Egan 75'; Koumas 84'; Joseph (yellow card) 90+5'	Report	Agyemang (yellow card) 2'; Forsyth 17'; Szmodics 42'; Ward (yellow card) 60'	Stadium: MKM Stadium; Attendance: 20,391; Referee: Adam Herczeg

28 February 2026 35	Portsmouth	0–1	Hull City	Portsmouth
12:30 GMT		Report	Hadžiahmetović (yellow card) 60'; Crooks 73'; Pandur (yellow card) 88'; Coyle (yellow card) 90+6'	Stadium: Fratton Park; Attendance: 20,228; Referee: Sam Allison
Note: Fixture was initially scheduled for a 15:00 kick-off, but was rescheduled for live Sky Sports broadcasting.

3 March 2026 32	Ipswich Town	1–0	Hull City	Ipswich
19:45 GMT	Matusiwa 71'; Kipré (yellow card) 82'; Walton (yellow card) 90+4'	Report	Coyle (yellow card) 36'; Crooks (yellow card) 62'; Pandur (yellow card) 63'; Egan (yellow card) 70'	Stadium: Portman Road; Attendance: 26,103; Referee: Lewis Smith
Note: Fixture was originally scheduled for 14 February, but it was rearranged due to both clubs' progression in the FA Cup.

7 March 2026 36	Hull City	1–3	Millwall	Kingston upon Hull
12:30 GMT	Gelhardt 18'; Lundstram (yellow card) 31'; Hughes (yellow card) 74'	Report	Cooper 14', (yellow card) 57'; Watson (yellow card) 39'; Cundle (yellow card) 54'; Ivanović 70'; Mitchell (yellow card) 76'; Coburn 78'	Stadium: MKM Stadium; Attendance: 21,504; Referee: David Webb
Note: Fixture was initially scheduled for a 15:00 kick-off, but was moved for live Sky Sports broadcasting.

10 March 2026 37	Wrexham	1–2	Hull City	Wrexham
19:45 GMT	Smith (yellow card) 8'; Rathbone (yellow card) 49'; Hyam (yellow card) 66'; Broadhead 76'	Report	McBurnie (yellow card) 7'; Gelhardt 40', (penalty missed) 44'; Hughes (yellow card) 45+1'; Koumas 63'; Collyer (yellow card) 86'; Joseph (yellow card) 90+4'	Stadium: Racecourse Ground; Attendance: 10,502; Referee: Stephen Martin

14 March 2026 38	West Bromwich Albion	3–0	Hull City	West Bromwich
15:00 GMT	Maja 24'; Diakité (yellow card) 61'; Heggebø 67'; Price 90+3'	Report	Hughes (red card) 36'; Crooks (yellow card) 51'; McBurnie (yellow card) 61'; Gelhardt (yellow card) 70'; Lundstram (yellow card) 88'	Stadium: The Hawthorns; Attendance: 23,245; Referee: Josh Smith

21 March 2026 39	Hull City	3–1	Sheffield Wednesday	Kingston upon Hull
15:00 GMT	Crooks 24', (yellow card) 49'; Egan (yellow card) 42'; Iorfa 45+6' (o.g.); Joseph 58'; Lundstram (yellow card) 88'	Report	Lowe 23'; McNeill (yellow card) 89'	Stadium: MKM Stadium; Attendance: 22,004; Referee: Dean Whitestone

3 April 2026 40	Oxford United	1–1	Hull City	Oxford
15:00 BST	Brannagan 13' (pen.)	Report	Belloumi 4'; Hughes (yellow card) 12'	Stadium: Kassam Stadium; Attendance: 11,477; Referee: Oliver Langford

6 April 2026 41	Hull City	0–0	Coventry City	Kingston upon Hull
20:00 BST	Coyle (yellow card) 53'	Report	Grimes (yellow card) 61'	Stadium: MKM Stadium; Attendance: 22,507; Referee: David Webb
Note: Fixture was initially scheduled for a 15:00 kick-off, but was pushed back for Sky Sports broadcasting.

11 April 2026 42	Sheffield United	2–1	Hull City	Sheffield
15:00 BST	McGuinness (yellow card) 66'; Tanganga (yellow card) 84'; Hamer 85' (pen.); Ings 88'; Hoever (yellow card) 90+1'	Report	McBurnie 5', (yellow card) 75'; Lundstram (yellow card) 66' (yellow-red card) 75'; Ajayi (yellow card) 72'; Egan (yellow card) 84'; Pandur (yellow card) 84'; Coyle (yellow card) 90+7'	Stadium: Bramall Lane; Attendance: 27,850; Referee: John Brooks

18 April 2026 43	Hull City	1–1	Birmingham City	Kingston upon Hull
15:00 BST	Gelhardt 24', (yellow card) 67'; McNair (yellow card) 29'; Ajayi (yellow card) 55'; Dowell (yellow card) 85'	Report	Stansfield (yellow card) 55'; Iwata 77'; Gray (yellow card) 86'; Neumann (yellow card) 88'; Ducksch (yellow card) 90+8'	Stadium: MKM Stadium; Attendance: 22,706; Referee: Stephen Martin

21 April 2026 44	Leicester City	2–2	Hull City	Leicester
19:45 BST	Thomas (yellow card) 34'; James 52' (pen.); Thomas 54'; Skipp (yellow card) 70'; Winks (yellow card) 86'	Report	Millar 18'; Giles (yellow card) 35'; McBurnie 63'; Pandur (yellow card) 85'	Stadium: King Power Stadium; Attendance: 27,062; Referee: Thomas Kirk
Note: Fixture was initially scheduled for 22 April, but was brought forward a day due to Leicester also playing the following Friday.

25 April 2026 45	Charlton Athletic	2–1	Hull City	Charlton
12:30 BST	Sichenje (yellow card) 2'; Kelman 20'; Kaminski (yellow card) 45+6'; Fevrier 68'	Report	Coyle (yellow card) 34'; Egan 45+7'	Stadium: The Valley; Attendance: 20,671; Referee: Tom Nield
Note: Fixture was initially scheduled for a 15:00 kick-off, but was brought forward for live Sky Sports broadcasting.

2 May 2026 46	Hull City	2–1	Norwich City	Kingston upon Hull
12:30 BST	McBurnie 28' (pen.), 67'; Joseph (yellow card) 71'; Crooks (yellow card) 90+5'	Report	Touré 26'; Fisher (yellow card) 35'; Maghoma (yellow card) 90+5'	Stadium: MKM Stadium; Attendance: 24,616; Referee: Josh Smith

==== Play-offs ====
Hull City finished 6th in the regular season and faced 3rd place Millwall in the semi-finals.

===== Semi-finals =====
8 May 2026 Semi final (1st leg)	Hull City	0–0	Millwall	Kingston upon Hull
20:00 BST		Report	De Norre (yellow card) 52'	Stadium: MKM Stadium; Attendance: 24,623; Referee: Gavin Ward

11 May 2026 Semi final (2nd leg)	Millwall	0–2 (0–2 agg.)	Hull City	New Cross
20:00 BST	Azeez (yellow card) 88'	Report	Egan (yellow card) 10'; Hughes (yellow card) 52'; Belloumi 64', (yellow card) 69'; Gelhardt 79', (yellow card) 90+5'	Stadium: The Den; Attendance: 17,768; Referee: Sam Barrott

===== Final =====
Southampton initially qualified for the play-off final by defeating Middlesbrough in their semi-final matches. However, following the Spygate scandal, Southampton were expelled from the play-offs on 19 May, sending Middlesbrough through to the final to face Hull City.

23 May 2026 Final	Hull City	1–0	Middlesbrough	Wembley
15:30 BST	McBurnie 90+5', (yellow card) 90+6'	Report		Stadium: Wembley Stadium; Attendance: 84,506; Referee: Jarred Gillett

=== FA Cup ===
Hull were drawn at home to Blackburn Rovers in the third round. The match took place on 11 January 2026, at full-time the match remained goalless and went to extra-time. This failed to break the deadlock, with Hull's David Akintola coming closest when he hit the bar. This led to a penalty shoot-out to determine which team would advance to the next round. Dillon Phillips saved the first two Blackburn Rovers attempts by Yūki Ōhashi and Moussa Baradji, Hull's first attempt by Lewie Coyle was saved by Balázs Tóth. The rest of the spot kicks were converted, with Akintola taking the final kick to put Hull through to the next round. This was the first time Hull had progressed to the next round since 2020, the draw for which took place on 12 January. The draw gave Hull a home game against Chelsea under new manager of former Hull manager Liam Rosenior, the match taking place over the weekend of 14–15 February.

Win Draw Loss Fixtures

11 January 2026 Third round	Hull City	0–0 (a.e.t.) (4–3 p)	Blackburn Rovers	Kingston upon Hull
14:30 GMT	Famewo (yellow card) 45'; McBurnie (yellow card) 74'; Drameh (yellow card) 76'; Slater (yellow card) 116'	Report	Powell (yellow card) 31'; O'Riordan (yellow card) 47'; Gardner-Hickman (yellow card) 119'	Stadium: MKM Stadium; Attendance: 6,627; Referee: Will Finnie
	Penalties
	Coyle (penalty missed); Joseph (penalty scored); McBurnie (penalty scored); Hughes (penalty scored); Akintola (penalty scored)		(penalty missed) Ōhashi; (penalty missed) Baradji; (penalty scored) Gardner-Hickman; (penalty scored) McLoughlin; (penalty scored) Doherty

13 February 2026 Fourth round	Hull City	0–4	Chelsea	Kingston upon Hull
19:45 GMT	Lundstram (yellow card) 73'; Gelhardt (yellow card) 90'	Report	Neto 40', 51', 71', (yellow card) 45+1'; Estêvão 59'; Sarr (yellow card) 66'	Stadium: MKM Stadium; Attendance: 24,320; Referee: Farai Hallam

=== EFL Cup ===
Hull were drawn away at Wrexham in the first round.

Win Draw Loss Fixtures

12 August 2025 1R	Wrexham	3–3 (5–3 p)	Hull City	Wrexham
19:45 BST	Lee 31'; Palmer 90+1', 90+2'	Report	Hughes (yellow card) 27'; McBurnie 36'; Gelhardt (yellow card) 53'; Ndala 70'; Crooks 81'; Lundstram (yellow card) 90+3'	Stadium: Racecourse Ground; Attendance: 10,106; Referee: Josh Smith
	Penalties
	McClean (penalty scored); Lee (penalty scored); Windass (penalty scored); Palmer (penalty scored); Marriott (penalty scored)		(penalty scored) Palmer; (penalty missed) Ndala; (penalty scored) Kamara; (penalty scored) Giles

== Statistics ==
=== Appearances ===
As of match played 23 May 2026

Appearances shown after a "+" indicate player came on during course of the match
Players with no appearances are not included on the list; italics indicate a loaned in player

No.	Pos	Nat	Player	Total		Championship		FA Cup		EFL Cup		Championship play-offs	
No.	Pos	Nat	Player	Apps	Goals	Apps	Goals	Apps	Goals	Apps	Goals	Apps	Goals
1	GK	(Croatia) CRO	Ivor Pandur	48	0	45	0	0	0	0	0	3	0
2	DF	(England) ENG	Lewie Coyle	44	0	37+2	0	2	0	0	0	3	0
3	DF	(England) ENG	Ryan Giles	37	0	30+2	0	0+1	0	1	0	3	0
4	DF	(England) ENG	Charlie Hughes	43	1	36+2	1	1	0	1	0	3	0
5	MF	(England) ENG	John Lundstram	33	1	16+13	1	0	0	1	0	0+3	0
6	DF	(Nigeria) NGR	Semi Ajayi	24	1	18+4	1	0	0	0	0	2	0
7	FW	(Canada) CAN	Liam Millar	38	3	22+11	3	2	0	0	0	3	0
8	MF	(Belgium) BEL	Eliot Matazo	1	0	1	0	0	0	0	0	0	0
9	FW	(Scotland) SCO	Oli McBurnie	42	19	32+5	17	1	0	1	1	3	1
10	FW	(Algeria) ALG	Mohamed Belloumi	25	3	10+12	2	0	0	0	0	2+1	1
11	FW	(Nigeria) NGR	David Akintola	21	1	5+15	1	0+1	0	0	0	0	0
12	GK	(England) ENG	Dillon Phillips	4	0	1	0	2	0	1	0	0	0
13	FW	(Japan) JPN	Yū Hirakawa	10	0	2+5	0	1	0	0	0	0+2	0
15	DF	(Republic of Ireland) IRL	John Egan	48	3	39+3	3	1+1	0	1	0	3	0
16	DF	(England) ENG	Matty Jacob	6	0	1+4	0	0+1	0	0	0	0	0
17	FW	(England) ENG	Abu Kamara	3	0	1+1	0	0	0	0+1	0	0	0
18	DF	(England) ENG	Cody Drameh	26	0	16+6	0	1+1	0	1	0	0+1	0
20	MF	(Bosnia and Herzegovina) BIH	Amir Hadžiahmetović	39	0	26+11	0	2	0	0	0	0	0
21	FW	(England) ENG	Joe Gelhardt	44	15	35+4	14	0+1	0	1	0	1+2	1
22	FW	(Scotland) SCO	Kyle Joseph	49	8	27+17	8	0+2	0	0+1	0	1+1	0
23	DF	(England) ENG	Akin Famewo	17	1	7+8	1	1	0	0+1	0	0	0
24	MF	(England) ENG	Darko Gyabi	21	2	6+14	2	1	0	0	0	0	0
25	MF	(England) ENG	Matt Crooks	35	5	28+3	4	0	0	0+1	1	3	0
26	FW	(England) ENG	Kieran Dowell	15	1	1+12	1	0+1	0	0	0	0+1	0
27	MF	(England) ENG	Regan Slater	48	2	35+7	2	1+1	0	1	0	3	0
33	MF	(England) ENG	Toby Collyer	5	0	1+4	0	0	0	0	0	0	0
36	FW	(Wales) WAL	Lewis Koumas	19	3	4+13	3	1	0	0	0	0+1	0
37	DF	(Northern Ireland) NIR	Paddy McNair	15	0	6+6	0	1	0	0	0	0+2	0
39	FW	(Turkey) TUR	Enis Destan	18	2	4+14	2	0	0	0	0	0	0
45	MF	(Jamaica) JAM	Kasey Palmer	11	0	3+6	0	1	0	1	0	0	0
47	MF	(England) ENG	Nathan Tinsdale	2	0	0+1	0	0	0	1	0	0	0
58	DF	(Republic of Ireland) IRL	Cathal McCarthy	8	0	1+5	0	1+1	0	0	0	0	0
Players who featured but departed the club during the season:
19	FW	(England) ENG	Joel Ndala	19	2	10+7	1	1	0	0+1	1	0	0
30	DF	(England) ENG	Brandon Williams	1	0	0+1	0	0	0	0	0	0	0

- Source: Compiled from competitive match reports

=== Top goalscorers ===
As of match played 23 May 2026

Player	Number	Position	Championship	FA Cup	EFL Cup	Championship play-offs	Total
(Scotland) Oli McBurnie	9	CF	17	0	1	1	19
(England) Joe Gelhardt	21	CF	14	0	0	1	15
(Scotland) Kyle Joseph	22	CF	8	0	0	0	8
(England) Matt Crooks	25	CM	4	0	1	0	5
(Wales) Lewis Koumas	36	MF	3	0	0	0	3
(Canada) Liam Millar	7	LW	3	0	0	0	3
(Algeria) Mohamed Belloumi	10	RW	2	0	0	1	3
(Republic of Ireland) John Egan	15	DF	3	0	0	0	3
(Turkey) Enis Destan	39	CF	2	0	0	0	2
(England) Darko Gyabi	24	CM	2	0	0	0	2
(England) Joel Ndala	19	LW	1	0	1	0	2
(England) Regan Slater	27	CM	2	0	0	0	2
(Nigeria) Semi Ajayi	6	CB	1	0	0	0	1
(Nigeria) David Akintola	11	RW	1	0	0	0	1
(England) Kieran Dowell	26	FW	1	0	0	0	1
(England) Akin Famewo	23	CB	1	0	0	0	1
(England) Charlie Hughes	4	CB	1	0	0	0	1
(England) John Lundstram	5	DM	1	0	0	0	1
Own goals			3	0	0	0	3
Total			70	0	3	3	76

=== Disciplinary record ===
As of match played 23 May 2026

Player	Number	Position	Championship		FA Cup		EFL Cup		Championship play-offs		Total	
Player	Number	Position	Yellow card	Red card	Yellow card	Red card	Yellow card	Red card	Yellow card	Red card	Yellow card	Red card
(England) John Lundstram	5	DM	10	1	1	0	1	0	0	0	12	1
(England) Charlie Hughes	4	CB	6	1	0	0	1	0	1	0	8	1
(England) Lewie Coyle	2	RB	13	0	0	0	0	0	0	0	13	0
(England) Matt Crooks	25	CM	13	0	0	0	0	0	0	0	13	0
(Scotland) Oli McBurnie	9	CF	8	0	1	0	0	0	1	0	10	0
(Republic of Ireland) John Egan	15	DF	8	0	0	0	0	0	1	0	9	0
(England) Joe Gelhardt	21	CF	5	0	1	0	1	0	1	0	8	0
(Croatia) Ivor Pandur	1	GK	8	0	0	0	0	0	0	0	8	0
(England) Regan Slater	27	CM	7	0	1	0	0	0	0	0	8	0
(England) Ryan Giles	3	LB	7	0	0	0	0	0	0	0	7	0
(Scotland) Kyle Joseph	22	CF	7	0	0	0	0	0	0	0	7	0
(Nigeria) David Akintola	11	RW	4	0	0	0	0	0	0	0	4	0
(Turkey) Enis Destan	39	CF	4	0	0	0	0	0	0	0	4	0
(Canada) Liam Millar	7	LW	3	0	0	0	0	0	0	0	3	0
(Nigeria) Semi Ajayi	6	CB	2	0	0	0	0	0	0	0	2	0
(Algeria) Mohamed Belloumi	10	FW	1	0	0	0	0	0	1	0	2	0
(England) Toby Collyer	33	MF	2	0	0	0	0	0	0	0	2	0
(England) Kieran Dowell	26	FW	2	0	0	0	0	0	0	0	2	0
(England) Cody Drameh	18	RB	1	0	1	0	0	0	0	0	2	0
(England) Akin Famewo	23	CB	1	0	1	0	0	0	0	0	2	0
(Northern Ireland) Paddy McNair	37	CB	2	0	0	0	0	0	0	0	2	0
(Bosnia and Herzegovina) Amir Hadžiahmetović	20	CM	1	0	0	0	0	0	0	0	1	0
(Republic of Ireland) Cathal McCarthy	58	CB	1	0	0	0	0	0	0	0	1	0
(England) Joel Ndala	19	LW	1	0	0	0	0	0	0	0	1	0
Total			117	2	6	0	3	4	1	0	131	2

== Kits ==
As with the previous season, all of the club's kits for the 2025–26 season would be manufactured by Kappa. On 15 July 2025, the club announced that the home shirt would be a plain amber body with black and amber tiger print sleeves. This would be accompanied by black shorts and amber socks. Three days later, on 18 July, Corendon Airlines extended their shirt sponsorship deal for a further two years. The away kit was then launched on 2 August, a black shirt with amber pinstripes accompanied by amber shorts and black socks. The third kit was launched on 25 September, this was light blue with a floral pattern, with dark blue trim. Shorts and sock would be light blue with dark blue trim.

== Awards ==
The annual awards for the club saw Regan Slater pick-up the Players' Player of the Year, Supporters' Player of the Year and PFA Community Champion awards. Player of the Year award, selected by head coach Sergej Jakirović, went to Oli McBurnie after scoring 18 goals in 39 appearances for the club. Charlie Hughes was presented with the award for Young Player of the Year for the second season in a row. The Frank Donoghue Academy Player of the Year award went to Calvin Okike. The award for Goal of the Season was voted for by supporters and went to Mohamed Belloumi for his goal against Millwall in the second-leg of the play-off semi-final on 11 May 2026.
