= Enis Destan =

Turkish footballer (born 2002)

Personal information
- Date of birth: 15 June 2002 (age 24)
- Place of birth: Konak, İzmir, Turkey
- Height: 1.86 m (6 ft 1 in)
- Position: Forward

Team information
- Current team: Konyaspor

Youth career
- 2017–2020: Altınordu

Senior career*
| Years | Team | Apps | (Gls) |
| 2020–2022 | Altınordu | 44 | (14) |
| 2022–2025 | Trabzonspor | 51 | (9) |
| 2022–2023 | → Warta Poznań (loan) | 21 | (1) |
| 2025–2026 | Hull City | 18 | (2) |
| 2026 | → Westerlo (loan) | 3 | (0) |
| 2026– | Konyaspor | 0 | (0) |

International career^{‡}
| 2021–2024 | Turkey U21 | 21 | (6) |
- * Club domestic league appearances and goals as of 10:52, 15 August 2026 (UTC) ‡ National team caps and goals as of 11 October 2024

Enis Destan (born 15 June 2002) is a Turkish professional footballer who plays as a forward for Süper Lig club Konyaspor.

== Club career ==
=== Altınordu ===
Destan came through the youth ranks of Altınordu, where he also began his senior professional career. He made his professional debut in his team's last fixture of 2019–20 TFF First League when he came on as a late substitute in a 1–1 draw against Menemenspor. In the next season, he scored 12 goals in 26 matches in the league and helped his team reach the play-off final for promotion to Süper Lig, where Altınordu lost 1–0 against local rivals Altay.

=== Trabzonspor ===
On 24 January 2022, he signed a four-and-a-half-year deal with Süper Lig side Trabzonspor.

==== Warta Poznań (loan) ====
After only appearing for Trabzonspor once since joining, in a Turkish Cup fixture, on 5 August 2022 Destan moved to Polish Ekstraklasa club Warta Poznań on a one-year loan spell.

=== Hull City ===
Following his release from Trabzonspor, Destan joined EFL Championship side Hull City on 1 August 2025. He signed a three-year contract, with the club able to extend the deal by a further year if necessary. He made his debut on 13 September, when he came on as an 85th-minute substitute for Kyle Joseph in the 2–2 away draw against Swansea City. He made his first start for Hull on 8 November 2025 and scored the opening goal in the 3–2 home win against Portsmouth.

==== Westerlo (loan) ====
On 30 January 2026, Destan signed for Belgian Pro League club Westerlo on loan until the end of the season. Destan made his debut on 16 May 2026 against Charleroi.

=== Konyaspor ===
On 14 August 2026, Destan signed for Konyaspor for an undisclosed fee.

== International career ==
Destan was called up to Turkey national under-21 football team for the first time for friendly fixtures against Croatia and Serbia, making his debut against the former in a 4–1 loss substituting for Ali Akman in the second half. Before the second match, he was called up to the senior team for the 2022 FIFA World Cup qualification match against Latvia, where he was an unused substitute.

== Career statistics ==
As of 8 January 2026

Appearances and goals by club, season and competition
| Club | Season | League | | | National cup (Note: Includes FA Cup, Polish Cup and Turkish Cup) | | League cup (Note: Includes EFL Cup) | | Other | | Total | |
| Club | Season | Division | Apps | Goals | Apps | Goals | Apps | Goals | Apps | Goals | Apps | Goals |
|---|---|---|---|---|---|---|---|---|---|---|---|---|
| Altınordu | 2019–20 | TFF 1. Lig | 1 | 0 | 0 | 0 | — | | — | | 1 | 0 |
| Altınordu | 2020–21 | TFF 1. Lig | 29 | 13 | 1 | 1 | — | | — | | 30 | 14 |
| Altınordu | 2021–22 | TFF 1. Lig | 14 | 1 | 2 | 1 | — | | — | | 16 | 2 |
| Altınordu | Total | | 44 | 14 | 3 | 2 | — | | — | | 47 | 16 |
| Trabzonspor | 2021–22 | Süper Lig | 0 | 0 | 1 | 0 | — | | — | | 1 | 0 |
| Trabzonspor | 2022–23 | Süper Lig | 0 | 0 | 0 | 0 | — | | — | | 0 | 0 |
| Trabzonspor | 2023–24 | Süper Lig | 33 | 9 | 5 | 3 | — | | — | | 38 | 12 |
| Trabzonspor | 2024–25 | Süper Lig | 18 | 0 | 2 | 1 | — | | 6 (Note: Four appearances in UEFA Europa League and two appearances and one goal in UEFA Europa Conference League) | 1 | 26 | 2 |
| Trabzonspor | Total | | 51 | 9 | 8 | 4 | — | | 6 | 1 | 65 | 14 |
| Warta Poznań (loan) | 2022–23 | Ekstraklasa | 21 | 1 | 2 | 1 | — | | — | | 23 | 2 |
| Hull City | 2025–26 | EFL Championship | 18 | 2 | 0 | 0 | 0 | 0 | — | | 18 | 2 |
| Westerlo (loan) | 2025–26 | Belgian Pro League | 3 | 0 | — | | — | | — | | 3 | 0 |
| Career total | | | 137 | 26 | 13 | 7 | 0 | 0 | 6 | 1 | 156 | 34 |
