= 2026 EFL Championship play-off final =

English football match to determine promotion to the Premier League

- Wembley Stadium in London hosted the final.
Hull City	Middlesbrough
1	0
- Date: 23 May 2026
- Venue: Wembley Stadium, London
- Referee: Jarred Gillett
- Attendance: 84,506

The 2026 EFL Championship play-off final was an association football match that was played on 23 May 2026 at Wembley Stadium, London, between Hull City and Middlesbrough. The match determined the third and final team to be promoted from the EFL Championship, the second tier of English football, to next season's Premier League. The top two teams of the 2025–26 EFL Championship, Coventry City and Ipswich Town, gained automatic promotion to the Premier League, while the clubs placed from third to sixth in the table took part in the play-off semi-finals. Hull and Middlesbrough finished sixth and fifth in the regular season respectively. The match was overshadowed by Southampton, who defeated Middlesbrough in the semi-final, spying on Middlesbrough's training sessions in what was called the Spygate scandal. Southampton were expelled from the final and replaced by Middlesbrough; Millwall were the other losing semi-finalist. Winning the match was estimated to be worth an extra £200 million through increased broadcast, matchday and sponsorship revenue in the Premier League.

The match, which was refereed by Jarred Gillett, was played on a hot day in front of a crowd of 84,506. After remaining goalless for the first half and most of the second half, Yū Hirakawa delivered a cross that Middlesbrough goalkeeper Sol Brynn spilled to Hull's Oli McBurnie, allowing him to score the only goal of the match in the fifth minute of second-half injury time. The match ended 1–0 to Hull, who won promotion back to the Premier League for the first time since 2017. There was criticism of the trophy ceremony broadcast after the camera angle was changed as Hirakawa was about to lift the trophy.

== Route to the final ==
EFL Championship final table, leading positions
Pos	Team	Pld	W	D	L	GF	GA	GD	Pts
1	Coventry City (C, P)	46	28	11	7	97	45	+52	95
2	Ipswich Town (P)	46	23	15	8	80	47	+33	84
3	Millwall	46	24	11	11	64	49	+15	83
4	Southampton	46	22	14	10	82	56	+26	80
5	Middlesbrough	46	22	14	10	72	47	+25	80
6	Hull City (O, P)	46	21	10	15	70	66	+4	73

Source: English Football League
(C) Champions; (O) Play-off winners; (P) Promoted

Middlesbrough finished the regular 2025–26 season in fifth place in the EFL Championship, the second tier of the English football league system, one place and seven points ahead of Hull City. Both clubs therefore missed out on the two automatic promotion places to the Premier League and instead took part in the play-offs to determine the third and final promoted team. Middlesbrough finished four points behind second-placed Ipswich Town and 15 points behind league winners Coventry City, while Hull finished 11 and 22 points behind those teams respectively.

The semi-finals were two-legged ties with each team playing the other once at home and once away, with Millwall playing Hull and Southampton facing Middlesbrough. The aggregate winners proceeded to the single-legged final at the Wembley Stadium to decide the third and final team to be promoted.

=== Hull City ===
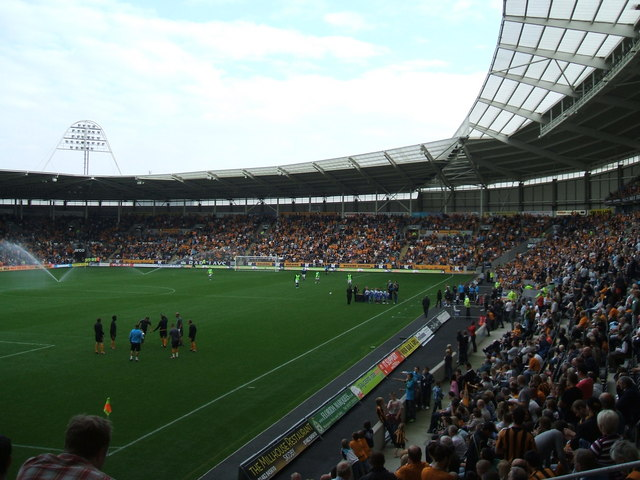
The MKM Stadium, Hull City's home stadium and host of the first leg

Hull City qualified for the play-off competition on the final day of the regular season, beating Norwich City 2−1 after coming from behind, edging seventh-placed Wrexham, who drew with Middlesbrough 2−2, by two points. In contrast, Millwall were already guaranteed a play-off place prior to the final day and could have been automatically promoted had they bettered Ipswich's result against Queens Park Rangers. Ipswich won 3−0 against QPR, denying Millwall automatic promotion and forcing them into the play-offs despite their 2−0 win against Oxford United.

The first leg, which took place at Hull's MKM Stadium on 8 May, ended goalless. Mohamed Belloumi hit the post for Hull in the first two minutes. In the final 20 minutes, Millwall's Camiel Neghli also hit the post. Ryan Leonard's goal for Millwall was disallowed towards the end for a foul by Tristan Crama on Charlie Hughes. The reverse leg took place at The Den three days later, which ended 2–0 to Hull. Belloumi cut inside to curl the opener off the far post in the 64th minute, followed by Joe Gelhardt firing low through the grasp of Anthony Patterson 15 minutes later. Hull won 2–0 on aggregate, winning a place in the final.

=== Middlesbrough ===
Although Middlesbrough were first in the EFL Championship as late as February, they finished the regular season in fifth place after a seven-match winless run in March and April, four points behind Ipswich, who occupied the last automatic promotion place. Relegated from the Premier League the previous season, Southampton had finished the season with a unbeaten run of 19 league games, finishing fourth ahead of Middlesbrough on goal difference, resulting in a semi-final meeting.

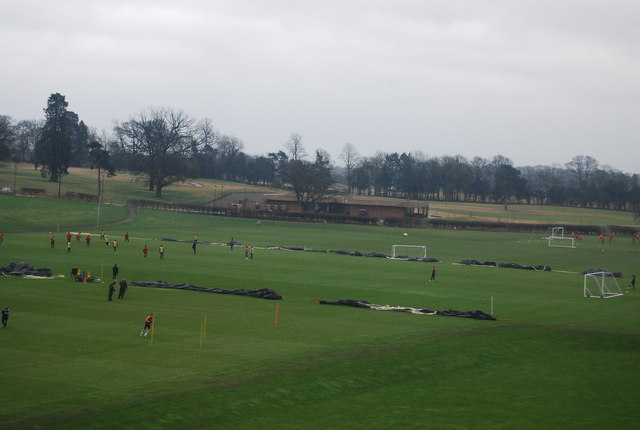
Rockliffe Park, Middlesbrough's training ground and the location of espionage

Two days before the first leg, a man wearing earphones, later identified as Southampton analyst intern William Salt, was seen by Middlesbrough club staff using a smartphone to film a training session at Middlesbrough's training ground Rockliffe Park. Middlesbrough subsequently reported the incident to the English Football League (EFL). Southampton were charged the next day with breaking EFL Regulations 3.4, requiring clubs to act towards other clubs and the EFL "with the utmost good faith", and 127.1, which prohibited clubs from observing an opponent's training session in the 72 hours before a match. The incident was dubbed Spygate by the English media.

The first leg took place at Middlesbrough's Riverside Stadium on 9 May, with the BBC's Adam Lanigan describing the match as a "fascinating" one that "somehow" ended goalless. Although Middlesbrough dominated the first half having taken 17 shots to Southampton's none, with 76.1% possession, they failed to score with Tommy Conway hitting the inside of the post. Southampton improved in the second-half, with Taylor Harwood-Bellis heading an effort against the crossbar, but the game finished goalless. Southampton won the reverse leg 2–1 four days later at St Mary's Stadium. Ross Stewart's header for Southampton just before half-time cancelled Riley McGree's goal in the fifth minute; Southampton scored in extra time when Shea Charles's cross from the right wing crept in at the far post. This gave them a 2–1 aggregate lead which sent Southampton through to the final, prior to the outcome of the disciplinary proceedings in relation to the espionage incident. Despite their defeat, Middlesbrough players returned to training at Rockliffe Park several days later, in the event they advanced to the final instead of Southampton.

A hearing with the EFL Independent Disciplinary Commission took place on 19 May, four days before the final. On that evening, Southampton admitted to conducting espionage against Middlesbrough, and also admitted and were charged with espionage in two regular season matches. The hearing concluded with Southampton expelled from the play-offs and Middlesbrough advancing in their place. Southampton were also deducted four points for the following Championship season. The next day, Southampton appealed against the ruling; the appeal was rejected later that day.

== Match ==
=== Background ===
Hull City had won both their previous Championship play-off finals 1−0, beating Bristol City in 2008 and Sheffield Wednesday in 2016. Their only other play-off campaign had been in 2001, losing to Leyton Orient 2−1 on aggregate in the semi-finals. Middlesbrough, who have never won a game at Wembley Stadium, had contested five second-tier play-off campaigns, but had only been promoted once through the play-offs, beating Chelsea in 1988 over two legs. Since then, they had reached the final once, losing 2−0 to Norwich City in 2015; in their last campaign, in 2023, they lost to Coventry City 1−0 in the semi-final. Hull City were restricted from signing players for a fee for two transfer windows after defaulting on payment to other clubs. Both teams last played in the top-flight in the 2016–17 season. In the regular season, the away team had won the meeting between the two sides. Middlesbrough won the meeting at Hull 4–1 on 5 December 2025, scoring four goals before half-time; the reverse fixture 24 days later ended 1–0 to Hull City. Oli McBurnie was Hull's top scorer with 17 goals, while Middlesbrough's top marksman was Morgan Whittaker with 14. Winning the match was estimated to be worth about £200 million from matchday and broadcast revenue and sponsorships in the Premier League.

Despite the uncertainty around Southampton's participation due to their espionage incident, ticket sales commenced on 15 May with Hull and Southampton receiving an initial allocation of 35,984 tickets, later increased by 1,620 for Southampton and 2,000 for Hull; the EFL were working on the basis that the final would proceed with Southampton, while having contingency options in place "for all potential scenarios". Southampton had already sold out their allocation by the morning of 19 May: these tickets were refunded after their expulsion. Tickets went on sale for Middlesbrough fans on 20 May; they sold out their allocation of 35,984 tickets two days later. After Southampton's expulsion, the EFL announced that the final would go ahead as scheduled on 23 May at a kick-off time of 15:30 BST, instead of 16:30 as originally scheduled. Hull City owner Acun Ilicali threatened to take legal action against the EFL should they lose the match, describing the reinstatement of Middlesbrough as "unbelievable", and suggested that either Hull were made play-off winners or Wrexham to play a semi-final against Middlesbrough. In response, EFL chairman Rick Parry was confident the result would stand.

The referee for the final was Jarred Gillett of Australia. Usually a Premier League referee, he had refereed one Championship game earlier in the season, Middlesbrough's 2–2 draw at Ipswich Town, awarding Ipswich a controversial penalty while Middlesbrough were leading 2–1. Neil Davies and Steven Meredith were the assistant referees, with Michael Salisbury named as the fourth official. Stuart Attwell and Constantine Hatzidakis were the video assistant referee (VAR) and assistant VAR respectively.

Both teams named a starting lineup with one change from their semi-final second legs: Mohamed Belloumi replaced the injured Kyle Joseph for Hull, while Alan Browne replaced Tommy Conway, who was also injured, for Middlesbrough. Hayden Hackney, the Championship player of the season, was named on the bench after a calf injury in March.

=== First half ===
Middlesbrough kicked off the match in front of a crowd of 84,506 in 30 °C (86 °F) heat. Both sides started with attacking intent; while competing for possession in the 11th minute, Hull's Matt Crooks stepped on Alan Browne, resulting in Browne needing treatment, although no free kick was given. Middlesbrough dominated after the incident, Aidan Morris firing a shot wide after winning the ball from 30 yards, followed by David Strelec heading over Browne's cross after a corner. By the drinks break that was taken midway through the first half, Middlesbrough controlled 76% of the possession, a pattern that continued after the break. In the 41st minute, Strelec attempted a shot towards the bottom right, but it deflected off his teammate Whittaker. Hull had two chances towards the end of the half, with Belloumi curling a shot wide of the top-left corner in the 42nd minute, while McBurnie's header deflected off Adilson Malanda's back and hit the crossbar three minutes later. In the three minutes of injury time, Middlesbrough also came close to scoring: David Strelec dribbled past a man only to shoot just wide of the left hand post from 20 yards. The first half ended goalless, with The Guardian's Scott Murray attributing the lack of action to "pressure and heat".

=== Second half ===
Oli McBurnie scored the only goal of the final.

Three minutes after the restart, Middlesbrough's captain, Dael Fry, headed the second of two successive corners over the crossbar, followed by Hull left-back Ryan Giles' overhit cross going just wide and over the top-right corner. Both teams had chances in the 61st minute: Morgan Whittaker passed to Riley McGree in the middle, whose shot was blocked, followed by Hull's counter-attack which saw Belloumi firing a shot straight at Brynn. The first substitution was made by Hull two minutes later, Joe Gelhardt replacing Liam Millar. Seven minutes later, Middlesbrough made their first change with Hackney making his first appearance in two months, replacing Strelec. McGree injured himself by overstretching his left leg in the 73rd minute, requiring treatment, and was replaced by Sontje Hansen. Hull substituted Giles and Belloumi for Yū Hirakawa and Cody Drameh at the same time. Gelhardt attempted a volley in the 82nd minute that went wide of the left-post.

The match was still goalless when eight minutes of injury time were signalled, with extra time impending if the match finished as a draw. However, on the fifth minute of injury time, Middlesbrough goalkeeper Sol Brynn parried a cross from the left delivered by substitute Hirakawa straight to McBurnie, allowing him to score his 18th goal of the season from six yards out. Believing he had scored the goal to promote Hull, McBurnie took off his shirt and was cautioned for his celebration. There were two substitutions from both teams after the goal – Jeremy Sarmiento and Cruz Ibeh replacing Alan Browne and Matt Targett for Middlesbrough, and Regan Slater and Lewie Coyle being replaced by John Lundstram and Paddy McNair. Middlesbrough failed to score from a free-kick in the 12th minute of injury time. The match ended with Hull winning 1−0, and they were promoted to the Premier League for the first time since 2017.

=== Details ===
23 May 2026
15:30 BST

Hull City	1−0	Middlesbrough
McBurnie 90+5'	Report

Wembley Stadium, London
Attendance: 84,506
Referee: Jarred Gillett

Hull City	Middlesbrough

GK	1	(Croatia) Ivor Pandur
RB	2	(England) Lewie Coyle (c)		(substituted off) 90+8'
CB	6	(Nigeria) Semi Ajayi
CB	15	(Republic of Ireland) John Egan
CB	4	(England) Charlie Hughes
LB	3	(England) Ryan Giles		(substituted off) 76'
CM	27	(England) Regan Slater		(substituted off) 90+8'
CM	25	(England) Matt Crooks
RW	10	(Algeria) Mohamed Belloumi		(substituted off) 76'
CF	9	(Scotland) Oli McBurnie	(yellow card) 90+6'
LW	7	(Canada) Liam Millar		(substituted off) 63'
Substitutes:
GK	12	(England) Dillon Phillips
DF	18	(England) Cody Drameh		(substituted on) 76'
DF	37	(Northern Ireland) Paddy McNair		(substituted on) 90+8'
MF	5	(England) John Lundstram		(substituted on) 90+8'
MF	20	(Bosnia and Herzegovina) Amir Hadžiahmetović
MF	26	(England) Kieran Dowell
MF	36	(Wales) Lewis Koumas
FW	13	(Japan) Yū Hirakawa		(substituted on) 76'
FW	21	(England) Joe Gelhardt		(substituted on) 63'
Manager:
(Bosnia and Herzegovina) Sergej Jakirović

GK	31	(England) Sol Brynn
CB	12	(England) Luke Ayling
CB	6	(England) Dael Fry (c)
CB	29	(France) Adilson Malanda
RM	2	(England) Callum Brittain
CM	16	(Republic of Ireland) Alan Browne	(substituted off) 90+7'
CM	18	(United States) Aidan Morris
LM	3	(England) Matt Targett	(substituted off) 90+7'
AM	11	(England) Morgan Whittaker
AM	8	(Australia) Riley McGree	(substituted off) 76'
CF	13	(Slovakia) David Strelec	(substituted off) 70'
Substitutes:
GK	32	(England) Joe Wildsmith
DF	25	(England) George Edmundson
MF	7	(England) Hayden Hackney	(substituted on) 70'
MF	22	(Australia) Samuel Silvera
MF	23	(England) Leo Castledine
FW	14	(Republic of Ireland) Alex Gilbert
FW	27	(Curaçao) Sontje Hansen	(substituted on) 76'
FW	44	(England) Cruz Ibeh	(substituted on) 90+7'
FW	45	(Ecuador) Jeremy Sarmiento	(substituted on) 90+7'
Manager:
(Sweden) Kim Hellberg

=== Statistics ===
Statistics
	Hull City	Middlesbrough
Total shots	9	13
Shots on target	2	0
Corner kicks	1	3
Fouls committed	6	2
Possession	32%	68%
Yellow cards	1	0
Red cards	0	0

== Post-match ==
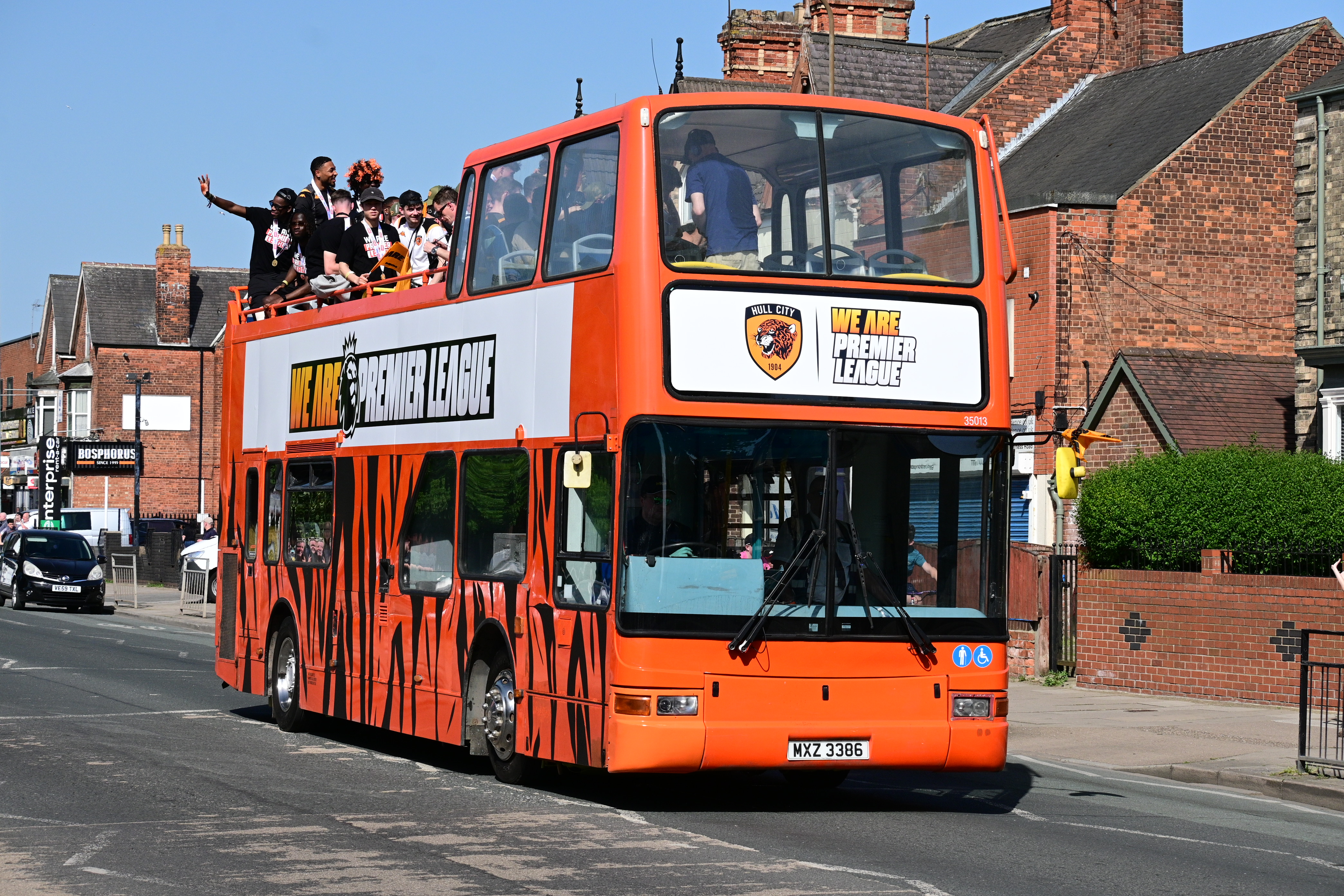
Hull City celebrate their promotion to the Premier League with a bus parade.

Hull City manager Sergej Jakirović was proud of his team: "with so many problems, everything that we achieved with the Premier League is unbelievable." He added that his side was impacted by the "collateral damage" of the espionage incident. His counterpart, Kim Hellberg, said that "it's been two heartbreaking losses in one week". McBurnie, the match winner, declared "it was written for me to get it", adding "I'm just delighted ... I can't speak highly enough of the lads." Hull celebrated with a bus parade on 25 May.

=== Broadcast controversy ===
Several South Korean and Japanese news outlets criticised the broadcast of the trophy ceremony after the match, when the live coverage changed camera angles when Japanese winger Hirakawa was about to lift the trophy. Described as "Asian passing" in South Korean and Japanese media, they reported that Asian players' trophy-lift moments have been repeatedly missed in English and European football broadcasts before switching back to capture the trophy lift.

== See also ==
- 2026 EFL League One play-off final
- 2026 EFL League Two play-off final
