= David Akintola =

Nigerian footballer (born 1996)

Personal information
- Date of birth: 13 January 1996 (age 30)
- Place of birth: Oyo, Nigeria
- Height: 1.78 m (5 ft 10 in)
- Position: Winger

Team information
- Current team: Omonia
- Number: 8

Youth career
- –2014: FC Ebedei
- 2014–2015: Midtjylland

Senior career*
Years	Team	Apps	(Gls)
2015–2021	Midtjylland	1	(0)
2015–2016	→ Thisted (loan)	3	(5)
2017	→ Jerv (loan)	25	(8)
2018	→ Haugesund (loan)	30	(9)
2019	→ Rosenborg (loan)	21	(5)
2020	→ Omonia (loan)	6	(0)
2020–2021	→ Hatayspor (loan)	35	(6)
2021–2024	Adana Demirspor	67	(10)
2024–2025	Çaykur Rizespor	45	(4)
2025–2026	Hull City	20	(1)
2026–	Omonia	0	(0)
- * Club domestic league appearances and goals as of 08:40, 10 September 2026 (UTC)

David Akintola (born 13 January 1996) is a Nigerian professional footballer who plays as a winger for Omonia.

== Club career ==
=== Early career ===
Akintola is a product of F.C. Ebedei. He played in the Torneo Bellinzona U18s, making one assist, and is viewed as one of Nigeria's most anticipated young talents.

Akintola transferred to FC Midtjylland in November 2014 from his new club's cooperative club, F.C. Ebedei. He played for Midtjylland U19 in the 2014–2015 season, where they won the league. He helped the team, scoring 9 goals.

=== Midtjylland ===
Before being loaned to Thisted FC, Akintola was promoted to the Midtjylland senior team prior to the new season.

Akintola was loaned out to Norwegian First Division-side FK Jerv on 11 March 2017 for the rest of the season. On 16 February 2018, he was loaned out again, this time to FK Haugesund.

In February 2019, Akintola was once again sent out on loan, this time to Rosenborg with the option to make the move permanent after the 2019 season.

In January 2020, Akintola signed a six-month loan contract with Omonia Nicosia.

On 28 September 2020, Akintola joined newly promoted Turkish Süper Lig club Hatayspor on a one-year loan.

=== Adana Demirspor ===
On 27 July 2021, Akintola transferred to Adana Demirspor on an undisclosed fee.

=== Hull City ===
On 15 August 2025, Akintola joined Hull City on a two-year deal. He made his debut on 17 August, when he came on as a 67th-minute substitute for Joel Ndala in the 3–2 home win against Oxford United. He scored his first goal for the club on 4 October, in the 1–0 home win against Sheffield United.

=== Omonia Nicosia ===
On 9 September 2026, Akintola joined Omonia on a permanent deal.

== Career statistics ==
As of 25 August 2026

Appearances and goals by club, season and competition
Club	Season	League			National cup (Note: Includes Norwegian Cup, Cypriot Cup, Turkish Cup)		League cup		Europe		Other		Total	
Club	Season	Division	Apps	Goals	Apps	Goals	Apps	Goals	Apps	Goals	Apps	Goals	Apps	Goals
Midtjylland	2015–16	Danish Superliga	1	0	0	0	—		—		—		1	0
Midtjylland	2016–17	Danish Superliga	0	0	0	0	—		—		—		0	0
Midtjylland	Total		1	0	0	0	0	0	0	0	0	0	1	0
Thisted (loan)	2015–16	Danish 2nd Division	3	5	0	0	—		—		—		3	5
Jerv (loan)	2017	Norwegian 1st Division	25	8	3	1	—		—		—		28	9
Haugesund (loan)	2018	Eliteserien	30	9	4	0	—		—		—		34	9
Rosenborg (loan)	2019	Eliteserien	21	5	4	2	—		11	2	—		36	9
Omonia (loan)	2019–20	Cypriot First Division	6	0	1	0	—		—		—		7	0
Hatayspor (loan)	2020–21	Süper Lig	35	6	2	1	—		—		—		37	7
Adana Demirspor	2021–22	Süper Lig	26	2	3	1	—		—		—		29	3
Adana Demirspor	2022–23	Süper Lig	29	6	1	1	—		—		—		30	7
Adana Demirspor	2023–24	Süper Lig	12	2	1	0	—		5	1	—		18	3
Adana Demirspor	Total		67	10	5	2	0	0	5	1	0	0	77	13
Hull City	2025–26	Championship	20	1	1	0	—		—		—		21	1
Hull City	2026–27	Premier League	0	0	0	0	1	0	—		—		1	0
Hull City	Total		20	1	1	0	1	0	—		—		22	1
Career total			208	44	20	6	1	0	16	3	0	0	245	53
