= Charlie Hughes (footballer, born 2003) =

English footballer (born 2003)

- Hughes in 2024

Personal information
- Full name: Charles Roger Hughes
- Date of birth: 16 October 2003 (age 23)
- Place of birth: Golborne, England
- Position: Centre-back

Team information
- Current team: Hull City
- Number: 4

Youth career
- 2009–2013: Manchester City
- 2013–2017: Liverpool
- 2017–2023: Wigan Athletic

Senior career*
Years	Team	Apps	(Gls)
2022–2024	Wigan Athletic	64	(5)
2024–	Hull City	65	(2)

International career
2023–2024	England U20	4	(0)
- * Club domestic league appearances and goals as of 19:45, 2 May 2026 (UTC)

Charles Roger Hughes (born 16 October 2003) is an English professional footballer who plays as a centre-back for Premier League club Hull City.

== Career ==
=== Wigan Athletic ===
Hughes is a youth product of Wigan Athletic, having joined their youth academy in 2017 as an u14. He had previously spent time at the youth academies of Manchester City and Liverpool. He was captain of Wigan's U18 side in the 2021–22 season. On 7 September 2021, he signed his first professional contract with the club. He made his professional debut with Wigan Athletic in a 1–0 EFL Trophy win over the Arsenal U21s on 25 January 2022. Hughes made his League debut on Boxing Day 2022 at the Riverside Stadium against Middlesbrough. He remained in the side for the remainder of the season, making 20 league appearances, and scoring his first professional goal on 29 April 2023 against Reading. Hughes signed a new four-and-a-half-year contract in February 2023, and then signed an improved deal a few months later, extending his contract until 2028. Hughes first captained the side on 8 August 2023, aged 19, for the Carabao Cup game v Wrexham and has since led the team out on many occasions throughout the season including the FA Cup 3rd round game against Manchester United. Nominated EFL Young Player of the Year 2023–24 after a stand out season.

=== Hull City ===
On 16 August 2024, Hughes signed a four-year deal with Hull City. He made his debut for the Tigers on 5 October, when he came off the bench as a half-time substitute for Sean McLoughlin in the 0–4 loss away to Norwich City. Hughes scored his first goal for the Tigers on 5 April 2025, with a last-minute header to secure a 1–0 win away at Sheffield Wednesday. On 6 May, Hull announced that the defender had won both the club's Young Player of the Season award and their Goal of the Season award, the latter for his goal against Wednesday.

Ahead of the 2025–26 campaign, Hughes became vice-captain to Lewie Coyle, replacing the outgoing Alfie Jones.

Hughes scored his first goal of the 2025–26 campaign on 17 January 2026, away at Southampton. Where he nodded home a corner delivered by Bosnian midfielder, Amir Hadziahmetovic, to put Hull City into a 2-0 lead 34 minutes in, following Kyle Joseph’s left footed finish from just inside the box 20 minutes in.

== International career ==
In November 2023, Hughes received his maiden international call up and made his England U20 debut during a 3–0 defeat to Italy at the Eco-Power Stadium. Hughes was capped again for the U20s on 7 June 2024 when he captained the side against Sweden U21, followed by 70 minutes against the Republic of Ireland U21s four days later.

== Playing style ==
Hughes has been described as "a commanding ball-playing centre-back, who can also play in midfield. He is extremely comfortable in possession with an exceptional passing range." He has captained the Wigan Athletic on several occasions from 19 years old and for most of the 2023–24 season. Hughes is now vice captain at Hull.

== Career statistics ==
As of match played 23 May 2026

Appearances and goals by club, season and competition
Club	Season	League			FA Cup		League Cup		Other		Total	
Club	Season	Division	Apps	Goals	Apps	Goals	Apps	Goals	Apps	Goals	Apps	Goals
Wigan Athletic	2021–22	League One	0	0	0	0	0	0	1 (Note: Appearances in EFL Trophy)	0	1	0
Wigan Athletic	2022–23	Championship	20	1	2	0	1	0	—		23	1
Wigan Athletic	2023–24	League One	43	4	3	0	1	0	4	0	51	4
Wigan Athletic	2024–25	League One	1	0	0	0	0	0	0	0	1	0
Wigan Athletic	Total		64	5	5	0	2	0	5	0	76	5
Hull City	2024–25	Championship	27	1	0	0	0	0	—		27	1
Hull City	2025–26	Championship	38	1	1	0	1	0	3 (Note: Appearances in EFL Championship play-offs)	0	43	1
Hull City	Total		65	2	1	0	1	0	3	0	70	2
Career total			129	7	6	0	3	0	8	0	146	7

== Honours ==
Hull City

- EFL Championship play-offs: 2026

Individual

- Hull City Young Player of the Year: 2024–25
- Hull City Goal of the Season: 2024–25 (v Sheffield Wednesday)
