= Darko Gyabi =

English footballer (born 2004)

Personal information
- Full name: Darko Boateng Gyabi
- Date of birth: 18 February 2004 (age 22)
- Place of birth: Catford, London, England
- Height: 6 ft 5 in (1.96 m)
- Position: Central midfielder

Team information
- Current team: Hull City
- Number: 24

Youth career
- 2012–2015: Cray Wanderers
- 2015–2018: Millwall
- 2018–2022: Manchester City

Senior career*
Years	Team	Apps	(Gls)
2022–2025	Leeds United	2	(0)
2024	→ Plymouth Argyle (loan)	10	(0)
2024–2025	→ Plymouth Argyle (loan)	43	(1)
2025–	Hull City	20	(2)

International career^{‡}
2019	England U15	2	(0)
2019–2020	England U16	8	(1)
2021–2022	England U18	2	(0)
2022–2023	England U19	4	(1)
2023–2025	England U20	12	(2)
2024–	England U21	2	(0)
- * Club domestic league appearances and goals as of 21:51, 8 January 2026 (UTC) ‡ National team caps and goals as of 10:15, 10 April 2025 (UTC)

Darko Boateng Gyabi (born 18 February 2004) is an English professional footballer who plays as a central midfielder for Premier League club Hull City.

== Club career ==
Having played for Cray Wanderers between the ages of eight and 11, Gyabi joined Millwall in 2015. In 2018, Gyabi left to join the academy of Manchester City. He played for City's under-21 side in three EFL Trophy games during the 2020–21 season.

On 4 July 2022, Gyabi joined Leeds United on a four-year contract for a £5 million transfer fee in part of a swap deal involving Kalvin Phillips. On 9 November 2022, he made his debut for Leeds in the EFL Cup against Wolverhampton Wanderers. The next month saw him make his Premier League debut on 28 December 2022 in the 3–1 defeat to Manchester City as a second-half substitute.

On 11 January 2024, Gyabi joined fellow Championship club Plymouth Argyle on loan until the end of the 2023–24 season. On 26 March 2024, his loan was cut short due to a season ending injury.

On 2 July 2024, Gyabi returned to Plymouth Argyle for a second, season-long, loan spell. on 21 December he scored his first career goal against Middlesbrough.

On 1 September 2025, Gyabi signed a three-year contract with Hull City having been allowed to leave Leeds United on a free transfer. He made his debut on 13 September, when he came on as an 84th-minute substitute for John Lundstram in the 2–2 away draw against Swansea City.

On 1 November 2025, Gyabi scored his first goal for Hull City in the 2–0 away victory against Norwich City, when he came on as a 76th-minute substitute and netted in the 87th-minute.

== International career ==
Gyabi is of Ghanaian descent.

In September 2021, Gyabi made his debut representing the England under-18 team.

On 21 September 2022, Gyabi made his England U19 debut during a 2–0 2023 U19 Euro qualifying win over Montenegro.

On 10 May 2023, Gyabi was included in the England squad for the 2023 FIFA U-20 World Cup. He scored in a group stage victory over Uruguay and also played in their round of sixteen elimination against Italy.

On 15 November 2024, Gyabi made his U21 debut as a substitute during a goalless draw with Spain in La Línea de la Concepción.

== Style of play ==
Gyabi is right footed and plays mainly as a box-to-box midfielder; he has been described as being a player who catches the eye with his skill in tight areas with ability to dribble through midfield.

== Career statistics ==
As of 11 January 2026

Appearances and goals by club, season and competition
Club	Season	League			FA Cup		League Cup		Other		Total	
Club	Season	Division	Apps	Goals	Apps	Goals	Apps	Goals	Apps	Goals	Apps	Goals
Manchester City U21	2020–21	—			—		—		3 (Note: Appearances in EFL Trophy)	0	3	0
Manchester City U21	2021–22	—			—		—		1	0	1	0
Manchester City U21	Total		0	0	0	0	0	0	4	0	4	0
Leeds United U21	2022–23	—			—		—		3	0	3	0
Leeds United	2022–23	Premier League	1	0	1	0	1	0	—		3	0
Leeds United	2023–24	Championship	1	0	0	0	1	0	0	0	2	0
Leeds United	2024–25	Championship	0	0	0	0	0	0	—		0	0
Leeds United	Total		2	0	1	0	2	0	0	0	5	0
Plymouth Argyle (loan)	2023–24	Championship	10	0	0	0	0	0	—		10	0
Plymouth Argyle (loan)	2024–25	Championship	43	1	3	0	2	0	—		48	1
Plymouth Argyle (loan)	Total		53	1	3	0	2	0	0	0	58	1
Hull City	2025–26	Championship	20	2	1	0	0	0	—		21	2
Career total			75	3	5	0	4	0	7	0	91	3
