= Hugh Parker (footballer) =

Irish footballer (born 2006)

Personal information
- Full name: Hugh William Parker
- Date of birth: 18 April 2006 (age 20)
- Place of birth: Greystones, Ireland
- Height: 1.88 m (6 ft 2 in)
- Position: Striker

Team information
- Current team: Scunthorpe United (on loan from Hull City)

Youth career
- 2010–2016: Greystones United
- 2016–2019: Cabinteely
- 2019–2022: Bray Wanderers
- 2022–2024: UCD

Senior career*
Years	Team	Apps	(Gls)
2024–2025	UCD	28	(2)
2025–	Hull City	0	(0)
2026	→ Carlisle United (loan)	13	(0)
2026–	→ Scunthorpe United (loan)	0	(0)
- * Club domestic league appearances and goals as of 19:50, 14 August 2026 (UTC)

Hugh William Parker (born 18 April 2006) is an Irish professional footballer who plays as a striker for Scunthorpe United, on loan from Premier League club Hull City.

== Early life ==
Parker is from Greystones, County Wicklow. He attended Temple Carrig School.

== Career ==
Parker joined Greystones United at the age of four, eventually leaving six years later for Cabinteely. In 2019, he signed for Bray Wanderers, initially joining their U13s team. After a few years of strong development, he made the move to UCD in 2022. Parker made his senior debut on 8 March 2024, coming on as a substitute in a 2–1 home loss to Wexford. A month later, he scored his first senior goal in a 2–0 away win over Treaty United on 26 April 2024.

On 4 February 2025, EFL Championship club Hull City signed Parker on a two-and-a-half year deal with the option of an additional year. Arriving for an undisclosed fee, he joined the Tigers only a few days after his UCD teammate Cathal McCarthy made the same switch. Although McCarthy would immediately return to UCD on a short-term loan, Parker moved straight into Hull's U21s team. On 7 February 2025, in a Professional Development League fixture against Birmingham City, the Irishman scored his first goal for his new club, as they recorded a 5–0 home win.

In February 2026 he moved on loan to Carlisle United. On 14 August 2026, he returned to the National League, joining Scunthorpe United on an initial six-month loan.
