= Toby Collyer =

English footballer (born 2004)

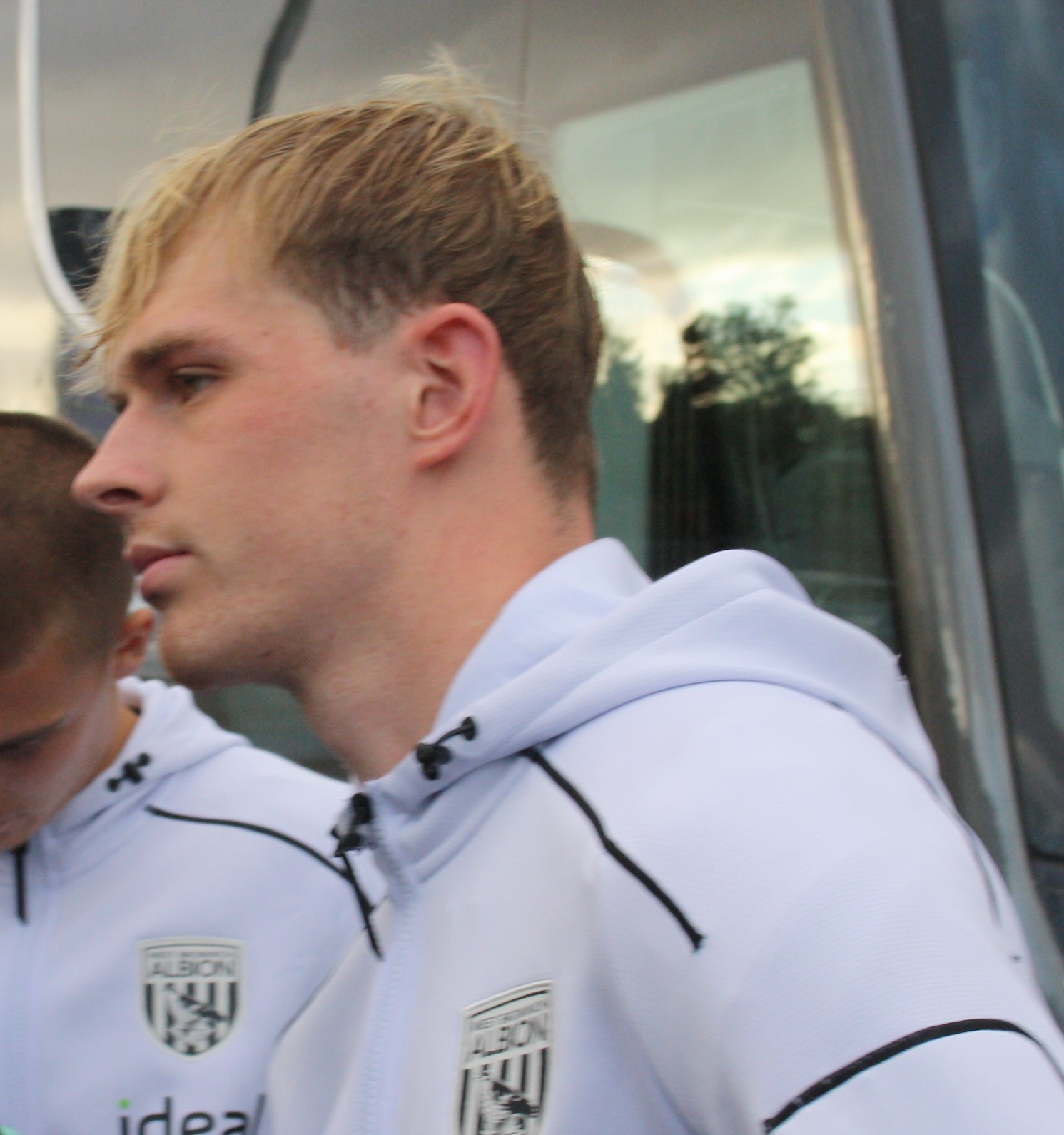
- Collyer with West Brom in 2025

Personal information
- Full name: Tobias Christopher Collyer
- Date of birth: 3 January 2004 (age 22)
- Place of birth: Worthing, England
- Height: 5 ft 11 in (1.80 m)
- Position: Defensive midfielder

Team information
- Current team: West Bromwich Albion
- Number: 15

Youth career
- –2022: Brighton & Hove Albion
- 2022–2024: Manchester United

Senior career*
| Years | Team | Apps | (Gls) |
| 2024–2026 | Manchester United | 6 | (0) |
| 2025–2026 | → West Bromwich Albion (loan) | 12 | (0) |
| 2026 | → Hull City (loan) | 5 | (0) |
| 2026– | West Bromwich Albion | 5 | (0) |

International career^{‡}
| 2019–2020 | England U16 | 7 | (0) |
| 2024–2025 | England U20 | 3 | (0) |
- * Club domestic league appearances and goals as of 13:41, 20 October 2026 (UTC) ‡ National team caps and goals as of 23:12, 24 March 2025 (UTC)

Tobias Christopher Collyer (born 3 January 2004) is an English professional footballer who plays as a defensive midfielder for EFL Championship club West Bromwich Albion.

Collyer joined Manchester United's youth system in 2022, from Brighton & Hove Albion. He made his first-team debut for United in August 2024. While at United, he had loan spells at West Bromwich Albion and Hull City. Collyer played youth international football for England at under-16 and under-20 levels.

== Club career ==
=== Brighton & Hove Albion ===
Born in Worthing, Collyer began his career in Brighton & Hove Albion's youth system at the under-12 level. At the age of 15, he made his under-18s debut. Collyer became a key player for the team in the 2020–21 season, as Brighton finished third in Premier League South and won the Premier League under-17s Cup. Soon after his 17th birthday, Collyer made his under-23s debut, playing the full 90-minute match against Tottenham Hotspur in January 2021.

=== Manchester United ===
In March 2022, he joined the Manchester United Academy. United signed him on a three-and-a-half-year deal after he turned down a new contract with Brighton & Hove Albion. He had impressed during his trial with United the previous month. During his signing, Collyer's former Brighton under-18 coach Mark Beard praised his work ethic, running ability, and discipline. He made a strong impression during his first season, playing for United in the under-21 team in Premier League 2 and appearing twice against the first-team side in the EFL Trophy. He also made three appearances for United's U21.

Collyer was included in Manchester United's first-team's opening pre-season squad to face Leeds United on 12 July 2023 in Oslo, but did not make it onto the pitch. He made his first-team debut in the starting eleven as Manchester United lost to Wrexham 3–1 on 26 July 2023 in San Diego on their USA Tour pre-season. Collyer made his competitive debut during the 2024 FA Community Shield against Manchester City, coming on as a substitute in the 59th minute. He made his Premier League debut on 1 September 2024, coming on as a half-time substitute for Casemiro in a 3–0 home defeat to Liverpool at Old Trafford. He also made his FA Cup debut on 12 January 2025, coming on as a substitute for Kobbie Mainoo in extra time in an away match against Arsenal that ended 5–3 on penalties. On 23 January 2025, Collyer made his Europa League debut in a 2–1 victory over Rangers. His performance earned him praise from team captain Bruno Fernandes. On 26 January 2025, Collyer came off the bench in a Premier League match against Fulham at Craven Cottage and cleared the ball off the line, his performance earning further praise from teammates and the public audience.

==== West Bromwich Albion (loan) ====
On 15 August 2025, Collyer joined West Bromwich Albion on a season-long loan. He made his debut the following day, in a 3–2 win against Wrexham. Following a calf injury against Birmingham City in late November, Collyer returned to Manchester United to recover. On 1 January 2026, it was announced that United had officially recalled him, ending his loan spell early, having made 12 appearances for the Albion.

==== Hull City (loan) ====
On 30 January 2026, Collyer returned to the Championship, joining Hull City on loan for the remainder of the season. He made his debut on 7 February in the 2–3 home defeat against Bristol City. He went on to make four substitute appearances and one start for the Tigers before the end of the season saw his return to Manchester.

=== West Bromwich Albion ===
On 30 August 2026, West Bromwich Albion signed Collyer on a four-year contract for an undisclosed transfer fee, reported to be worth a total £7.6 million. He made his second debut for the Baggies in a 1–1 draw with QPR in the Championship on 12 September.

== International career ==
Collyer played youth international football for England, making seven appearances for the under-16 team and three appearances for the under-20 team. He captained England at under-16 level.

On 10 October 2024, Collyer made his England under-20 debut during a 2–1 win over Italy in Frosinone.

== Career statistics ==
As of match played 17 October 2026

Appearances and goals by club, season and competition
| Club | Season | League | | | FA Cup | | League Cup | | Europe | | Other | | Total | |
| Club | Season | Division | Apps | Goals | Apps | Goals | Apps | Goals | Apps | Goals | Apps | Goals | Apps | Goals |
|---|---|---|---|---|---|---|---|---|---|---|---|---|---|---|
| Manchester United U21 | 2022–23 | — | | | — | | — | | — | | 3 (Note: Appearance(s) in EFL Trophy) | 0 | 3 | 0 |
| Manchester United U21 | 2023–24 | — | | | — | | — | | — | | 2 | 0 | 2 | 0 |
| Manchester United U21 | 2024–25 | — | | | — | | — | | — | | 1 | 0 | 1 | 0 |
| Manchester United U21 | Total | | — | | — | | — | | — | | 6 | 0 | 6 | 0 |
| Manchester United | 2024–25 | Premier League | 6 | 0 | 1 | 0 | 1 | 0 | 4 (Note: Appearances in UEFA Europa League) | 0 | 1 (Note: Appearance in FA Community Shield) | 0 | 13 | 0 |
| Manchester United | 2025–26 | Premier League | 0 | 0 | 0 | 0 | — | | — | | — | | 0 | 0 |
| Manchester United | Total | | 6 | 0 | 1 | 0 | 1 | 0 | 4 | 0 | 1 | 0 | 13 | 0 |
| West Bromwich Albion (loan) | 2025–26 | Championship | 12 | 0 | — | | — | | — | | — | | 12 | 0 |
| Hull City (loan) | 2025–26 | Championship | 5 | 0 | — | | — | | — | | 0 | 0 | 5 | 0 |
| West Bromwich Albion | 2026–27 | Championship | 5 | 0 | 0 | 0 | — | | — | | — | | 2 | 0 |
| Career total | | | 28 | 0 | 1 | 0 | 1 | 0 | 4 | 0 | 7 | 0 | 41 | 0 |

== Honours ==
Manchester United

- UEFA Europa League runner-up: 2024–25
