= Pharrell Brown =

English footballer (born 2004)

Personal information
- Full name: Pharrell Dior Brown
- Date of birth: 12 December 2004 (age 21)
- Place of birth: Manchester, England
- Height: 1.78 m (5 ft 10 in)
- Position: Winger

Team information
- Current team: Hull City
- Number: 45

Youth career
- –2021: Manchester United
- 2021–2022: Fleetwood Town

Senior career*
Years	Team	Apps	(Gls)
2022–2024	Fleetwood Town	1	(0)
2022	→ Clitheroe (loan)	1	(0)
2024–2026	Hull City	0	(0)
2025–2026	→ Hartlepool United (loan)	10	(0)
2026–	Altrincham	0	(0)
- * Club domestic league appearances and goals

Pharrell Dior Brown is an English professional footballer who plays as a winger for Altrincham.

== Career ==
Brown started his career in the youth team at Manchester United before joining EFL League One side Fleetwood Town on a two-year scholarship in the summer of 2021.

On 24 December 2022, he signed for Northern Premier League Division One West side Clitheroe on loan to gain some first team experience. He made his debut on Boxing Day, two days later in a 2–1 defeat away to local rivals Colne, replacing Jamie Edwards as a late substitute, in which proved to be his only appearance for the club.

Following his return from Clitheroe, he was a regular in the under-18 setup and was a key player in the sides record-breaking FA Youth Cup run to the fifth round, winning the man-of-the-match award with two goals in the fourth round win over EFL Championship side Middlesbrough. He then broke into the first team towards the end of the 2022–23 season, initially making the bench a couple of times in April 2023, before making his EFL debut as a late substitute in the 5–2 win over Lancashire rivals Accrington Stanley at the Crown Ground.

On 11 May 2023, he signed his first professional contract with Fleetwood following the end of his scholarship and after winning the Academy Players' Player of the Year award.

On 24 July 2024, Brown signed for EFL Championship side Hull City on a two-year contract, with the club holding the option of an extra year.

On 15 November 2025, he signed for National League club Hartlepool United on a one month loan deal. He was a late substitute later that day for Hartlepool in a 1–1 home draw with Wealdstone.

== Career statistics ==
As of match played 11 February 2026

Appearances and goals by club, season and competition
Club	Season	League			FA Cup		EFL Cup		Other		Total	
Club	Season	Division	Apps	Goals	Apps	Goals	Apps	Goals	Apps	Goals	Apps	Goals
Fleetwood Town	2022–23	League One	1	0	0	0	0	0	0	0	1	0
Fleetwood Town	2023–24	League One	0	0	0	0	0	0	1 (Note: Appearance in EFL Trophy)	0	1	0
Fleetwood Town	Total		1	0	0	0	0	0	1	0	2	0
Clitheroe (loan)	2022–23	NPL Division One West	1	0	—		—		—		1	0
Hull City	2024–25	Championship	0	0	0	0	0	0	0	0	0	0
Hull City	2025–26	Championship	0	0	0	0	0	0	0	0	0	0
Hull City	Total		0	0	0	0	0	0	0	0	0	0
Hartlepool United (loan)	2025–26	National League	10	0	0	0	0	0	1	0	11	0
Career total			12	0	0	0	0	0	2	0	14	0
