= Joel Ndala =

English footballer (born 2006)

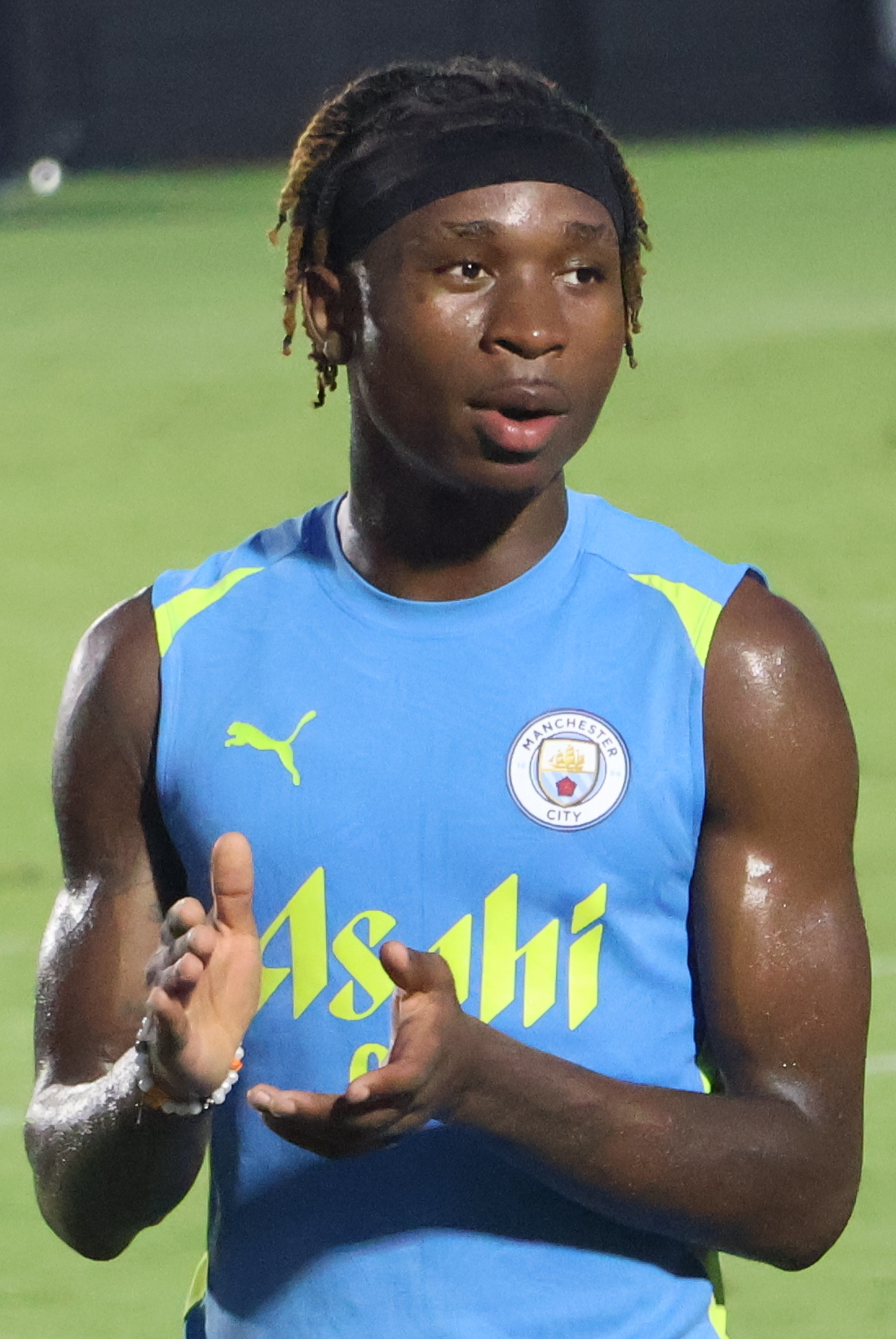
- Ndala with Manchester City in 2024

Personal information
- Full name: Joel Tshisanga Ndala
- Date of birth: 31 May 2006 (age 20)
- Place of birth: Manchester, England
- Height: 1.78 m (5 ft 10 in)
- Positions: Left winger; forward

Team information
- Current team: Cercle Brugge
- Number: 17

Youth career
- –2017: Port Vale
- 2017–2023: Manchester City

Senior career*
Years	Team	Apps	(Gls)
2023–2026	Manchester City	0	(0)
2024–2025	→ Jong PSV (loan)	12	(1)
2025	→ Nottingham Forest (loan)	0	(0)
2025–2026	→ Hull City (loan)	17	(1)
2026	→ Sheffield Wednesday (loan)	8	(0)
2026–	Cercle Brugge	1	(0)

International career^{‡}
2021	England U16	1	(1)
2023	England U17	4	(3)
2022–2024	England U18	11	(2)
2024	England U19	2	(0)
2025–	England U20	3	(0)
- * Club domestic league appearances and goals as of 14:08, 27 September 2026 (UTC) ‡ National team caps and goals as of 18:14, 27 March 2026 (UTC)

Joel Tshisanga Ndala (born 31 May 2006) is an English footballer who plays as a left winger or forward for Belgian Pro League club Cercle Brugge. He has represented England up to under-20 level, though he is also eligible to represent the Democratic Republic of the Congo and France.

Ndala joined the Manchester City Academy from Port Vale for a £300,000 fee in 2017 and turned professional in July 2022. He spent the first half of the 2024–25 season on loan at Jong PSV, the reserve team of Dutch club PSV Eindhoven. He joined Nottingham Forest on loan in February 2025. He was loaned to Hull City and Sheffield Wednesday in the 2025–26 campaign. He was sold to Belgian club Cercle Brugge in July 2026.

== Early and personal life ==
Ndala was born in Manchester and grew up in France before returning to England to live in Burslem, Stoke-on-Trent at seven years old. He attended school at St Nathaniel's Academy in Stoke. He then quickly moved to Port Vale Academy. He left Burslem when he signed for Manchester City at the age of 10. Ndala holds both Congolese and French nationalities.

== Club career ==
=== Manchester City ===
Ndala played in the youth ranks at Port Vale, until he joined Manchester City in 2017, at the age of ten years-old, for a fee later reported to be £300,000. Ndala signed a professional contract with Manchester City in July 2022. He was named by English newspaper The Guardian as one of the best first-year scholars in the Premier League in September 2022. He progressed through the Citizens' youth ranks, impressing in the FA Youth Cup during the 2022–23 season. He had 25 goal involvements for Ben Wilkinson's U18 Premier League-winning side in the 2022–23 season and was called up to play under Brian Barry-Murphy in the UEFA Youth League. He was included in the senior squad that travelled to Saudi Arabia to play in the 2023 FIFA Club World Cup. He helped the under-18 team to win the FA Youth Cup at the end of the 2023–24 season and also scored against senior opposition for the under-21s in the EFL Trophy.

On 3 September 2024, Ndala joined Dutch Eredivisie club PSV Eindhoven on a season-long loan with an obligation to buy for an initial £5.4 million (with a 20% sell-on clause) that could rise to £8.4 million through add-ons. He was assigned to the reserve team Jong PSV and scored one goal in 12 Eerste Divisie games. On 3 February 2025, Ndala joined Premier League club Nottingham Forest on a season-long loan, with an option to purchase for £4 million. He was assigned to the Academy team, participating in Premier League 2 matches.

On 29 July 2025, Ndala joined Championship club Hull City on a season-long loan. He made his debut on 9 August, the opening day of the season, in a 0–0 away draw to Coventry City. He scored his first goal for the club in the First Round of the EFL Cup on 12 August when he came off the bench as a 76th-minute substitute for Nathan Tinsdale, in a 3–3 draw away at Wrexham. He said in November that he was enjoying the competition in Sergej Jakirović's squad and was learning a lot about the defensive side of the game. On 2 February, he was recalled from his loan at Hull City having played 19 games, scoring twice, before being sent on loan to Championship club Sheffield Wednesday for the remainder of the 2025–26 season. He made his Sheffield Wednesday debut starting in the 4–0 defeat to Swansea City on 8 February 2026. It was reported that Ndala had turned up late to games against Millwall and Stoke City and faced disciplinary action, with Wednesday looking to terminate his loan early.

=== Cercle Brugge ===
On 29 July 2026, Ndala signed for Belgian Pro League club Cercle Brugge on a four-year contract for an undisclosed fee.

== International career ==
In August 2021 Ndala scored for the England under-16 team in a game against Scotland. He made his debut for the England under-18 side as a 16-year-old in September 2022. He scored his first goal for England under-18s against Croatia under-18s in March 2023.

Ndala was selected to represent England at the 2023 FIFA U-17 World Cup and scored the winning goal in a 2–1 victory over Iran at Jakarta International Stadium in November 2023. Their next group game saw him score a consolation during a defeat against Brazil. His third and last goal of the tournament came in their round of 16 elimination against Uzbekistan.

On 9 October 2024, Ndala made his U19 debut during a 2–1 defeat to Portugal in Marbella.

On 5 September 2025, Ndala made his U20 debut during a 2–1 defeat to Italy at the SMH Group Stadium.

== Style of play ==
After his performances at the U17 World Cup in 2023, Ndala was identified by ESPN as one of the stars of the tournament with "phenomenal change of pace and highly developed off-the-ball movement". Comparisons were drawn in style with Jérémy Doku.

== Career statistics ==
As of 8 August 2026

Appearances and goals by club, season and competition
Club	Season	League			National cup (Note: Includes FA Cup, KNVB Cup, Belgian Cup)		League cup (Note: Includes EFL Cup)		Other		Total	
Club	Season	Division	Apps	Goals	Apps	Goals	Apps	Goals	Apps	Goals	Apps	Goals
Manchester City U21	2022–23	—			—		—		1 (Note: Appearances in EFL Trophy)	0	1	0
Manchester City U21	2023–24	—			—		—		2	1	2	1
Manchester City U21	Total		—		—		—		3	1	3	1
Jong PSV (loan)	2024–25	Eerste Divisie	12	1	—		—		—		12	1
Nottingham Forest (loan)	2024–25	Premier League	0	0	0	0	—		—		0	0
Hull City (loan)	2025–26	Championship	17	1	1	0	1	1	—		19	2
Sheffield Wednesday (loan)	2025–26	Championship	8	0	—		—		—		8	0
Cercle Brugge	2026–27	Belgian Pro League	1	0	0	0	—		—		1	0
Career total			38	2	1	0	1	1	3	1	43	4

== Honours ==
England U18s

- U18 Pinatar Super Cup: 2024

Manchester City Academy

- U18 Premier League: 2021–22, 2022–23
- Premier League 2: 2021–22, 2022–23
- FA Youth Cup: 2023–24
- U18 Premier League Cup: 2023–24
