= Marko Salatović =

Croatian footballer and coach (born 1984)

- Salatović in 2026

Personal information
- Date of birth: 4 December 1984 (age 41)
- Place of birth: Zagreb, SR Croatia, Yugoslavia
- Position: Midfielder

Team information
- Current team: Hull City (assistant head coach)

Senior career*
| Years | Team | Apps | (Gls) |
| 2003–2005 | Radnik Sesvete | | |
| 2005–2009 | Moslavina | | |
| 2009–2010 | Vrbovec | | |
| 2010–2013 | Radnik Sesvete | | |
| 2013 | Lekenik | | |
| 2013–2014 | Croatia Prigorje | | |
| 2014–2015 | Sesvete | | |
| 2015–2018 | Rugvica | | |
| 2018 | Rugvica Sava | | |
| 2018–2020 | Strmec Bedenica | | |

Managerial career
- 2019: Sesvete (assistant)
- 2020: Maribor (assistant)
- 2020–2021: Sesvete (assistant)
- 2021–2022: Zrinjski Mostar (assistant)
- 2022–2023: Rijeka (assistant)
- 2023–2024: Dinamo Zagreb (assistant)
- 2025: Kayserispor (assistant)
- 2025–: Hull City (assistant)
- * Club domestic league appearances and goals

Marko Salatović (born 4 December 1984) is a Croatian professional football coach and former player who is the assistant head coach of Premier League club Hull City.

== Coaching career ==
Salatović is a UEFA Pro licence holder, and began his coaching career at his former club Sesvete. Whilst there he acted as assistant to Dino Babić, before a short spell as the head coach of the U19s. For the majority of his coaching career, Salatović has been the assistant of Sergej Jakirović. The pair first worked together with Maribor in 2020. In the years since, they have coached together in Bosnia, Croatia, Turkey, and England.

In May 2022, whilst coaching at Zrinjski Mostar, Salatović made headlines when he claimed he could not remember the name of Velež Mostar coach Feđa Dudić following a recent 1–1 draw in the Mostar derby. Just under a year later, in February 2023, Salatović accompanied Jakirović at Dinamo Zagreb after a brief spell together at Rijeka. The pair left the club by mutual consent on 19 September 2024, having been beaten 9–2 away at Bayern Munich in the Champions League two days prior.

The duo then worked with Kayserispor for the second half of the 2024–25 season, steering them clear of relegation and keeping the side in the top flight. After their dismissal following the campaign's conclusion, Jakirović was appointed head coach of EFL Championship club Hull City on 11 June 2025, where he was joined by Salatović. In their debut season in England, the pair achieved a surprise promotion to the Premier League via the play-offs.

== Honours ==
=== Assistant coach ===
Zrinjski Mostar

- Bosnian Premier League: 2021–22

Dinamo Zagreb

- Croatian Football League: 2023–24
- Croatian Cup: 2023–24

Hull City

- EFL Championship play-offs: 2026
