= Cathal McCarthy (footballer) =

Irish footballer (born 2006)

Personal information
- Date of birth: 31 August 2006 (age 20)
- Place of birth: Caragh, County Kildare, Ireland
- Height: 1.85 m (6 ft 1 in)
- Positions: Defensive midfielder; centre-back; right-back

Team information
- Current team: Kilmarnock (on loan from Hull City)
- Number: 4

Youth career
- Caragh Celtic
- Newbridge Town
- Klub Kildare
- –2025: UCD
- 2025–: Hull City

Senior career*
Years	Team	Apps	(Gls)
2024–2025	UCD	4	(0)
2025–	Hull City	6	(0)
2025	→ UCD (loan)	15	(0)
2026–	→ Kilmarnock (loan)	0	(0)

International career^{‡}
2024–2025	Republic of Ireland U19	5	(1)
2025–	Republic of Ireland U21	8	(0)
- * Club domestic league appearances and goals as of 17:45, 19 August 2026 (UTC) ‡ National team caps and goals as of 00:07, 18 November 2026 (UTC)

Cathal McCarthy (born 31 August 2006) is an Irish professional footballer who plays as a defensive midfielder and centre-back for Scottish Premiership club Kilmarnock, on loan from Premier League club Hull City. He also represents the Republic of Ireland at youth level.

== Club career ==
=== Early career ===
McCarthy is from Caragh, County Kildare. He began his career at Caragh Celtic, a club local to him. McCarthy's strong performances for Caragh Celtic allowed him to break into other, stronger clubs in his area. He also played underage football with Newbridge Town, Klub Kildare and UCD, and broke into the first team in the 2024 season.

=== UCD ===
On 24 May 2024, he made his senior debut for UCD away to Athlone Town, appearing as a second-half substitute in a 2–2 draw.

Ahead of the 2025 winter transfer window, Derby County, Everton, Fulham, Millwall, and Norwich City had all expressed interest in recruiting McCarthy. However, he ultimately signed for EFL Championship club Hull City on 1 February 2025, arriving on a two-and-a-half year deal. As part of his contract, McCarthy was loaned straight back to UCD until 30 June to finish his leaving certificate, achieving 542 points. On 1 July 2025, he returned to Hull and began playing for their U21s.

=== Hull City ===
McCarthy made his senior debut for Hull City on 23 August 2025. Amidst a minor injury crisis, he was promoted to start at centre-back alongside fellow-Irishman John Egan against Blackburn Rovers. However, the match was one to forget for McCarthy, as Blackburn ran out 3–0 winners at the MKM Stadium. In July 2026, following his side's promotion to the Premier League, McCarthy drew interest from clubs in the Premier League, EFL Championship and Scottish Premiership, with Hull reportedly turning down an initial bid from Nottingham Forest for him. In August 2026, he was linked with a loan move to the Scottish Premiership, with McCarthy stating "it's everyone's dream to play in the Premier League, but I'm not too worried about it. If it comes this year or if it comes next year, if I were to wait a few years, that's ok. I know I just need to play. At this age, you just need to play 30 games in a league, just get minutes under the belt. If they send me out loan, I'm more than happy to do that because minutes are important when you're this young." On 18 August 2026, the same day that he was loaned out for more first team experience, he was given a new long-term contract by Hull City.

==== Kilmarnock loan ====
On 18 August 2026, McCarthy signed for Scottish Premiership club Kilmarnock on a season-long long deal.

== International career ==
McCarthy made his debut for the Republic of Ireland U19s in a 3–1 win over Kazakhstan on 7 September 2024. He scored his first goal in his second cap against Greece on 9 October 2024. On 28 August 2025, he received his first call up to the U21s.

== Career statistics ==
As of 7 March 2026

Appearances and goals by club, season and competition
Club	Season	League			National Cup (Note: Includes FAI Cup, FA Cup & Scottish Cup)		League Cup (Note: Includes EFL Cup & Scottish League Cup)		Other		Total	
Club	Season	Division	Apps	Goals	Apps	Goals	Apps	Goals	Apps	Goals	Apps	Goals
UCD	2024	LOI First Division	4	0	0	0	–		1 (Note: Appearance(s) in the Leinster Senior Cup)	0	5	0
Hull City	2024–25	Championship	0	0	–		–		–		0	0
Hull City	2025–26	Championship	6	0	2	0	0	0	0	0	8	0
Hull City	2026–27	Premier League	0	0	–		–		–		0	0
Hull City	Total		6	0	2	0	0	0	0	0	8	0
UCD (loan)	2025	LOI First Division	15	0	0	0	–		0	0	15	0
Kilmarnock (loan)	2026–27	Scottish Premiership	0	0	0	0	0	0	–		0	0
Career total			25	0	2	0	0	0	1	0	28	0
