= Kyle Joseph =

Scottish-English footballer (born 2001)

Personal information
- Full name: Kyle Alexander Joseph
- Date of birth: 10 September 2001 (age 25)
- Place of birth: Chipping Barnet, England
- Height: 6 ft 1 in (1.86 m)
- Position: Forward

Team information
- Current team: Middlesbrough
- Number: 22

Youth career
- –2020: Wigan Athletic

Senior career*
Years	Team	Apps	(Gls)
2020–2021	Wigan Athletic	18	(5)
2021–2023	Swansea City	10	(0)
2021–2022	→ Cheltenham Town (loan)	19	(4)
2022–2023	→ Oxford United (loan)	37	(9)
2023–2025	Blackpool	54	(9)
2025–2026	Hull City	62	(8)
2026–	Middlesbrough	13	(0)

International career
2018	Scotland U18	2	(0)
2019–2020	Scotland U19	7	(1)
2021	Scotland U21	1	(0)
- * Club domestic league appearances and goals as of 22:04, 4 November 2026 (UTC)

Kyle Alexander Joseph (born 10 September 2001) is a professional footballer who plays as a forward for EFL Championship club Middlesbrough. Born in England, Joseph is a youth international for Scotland.

== Early life and education ==
Joseph was born in Chipping Barnet. He attended Birkdale High School in Southport.

== Club career ==
=== Wigan Athletic ===
Joseph joined Wigan Athletic's academy at the age of 13 and signed his first professional contract with the club in February 2019, lasting until summer 2021. He made his debut as a substitute in a 3–2 defeat at home to Northampton Town on 31 October 2020, before making his full debut for the club against Blackpool on 3 November.

He scored his first goal for Wigan on 5 December 2020 with the only goal in a League One victory over Sunderland. On 29 December, he scored his first senior hat-trick as Wigan defeated Burton Albion 4–3 in League One.

Joseph was substituted in the second half of a 5–0 defeat at home to Blackpool on 26 January 2021 after sustaining a back injury, with manager Leam Richardson stating after the match that "he will be out for a large part of the season". He returned to the matchday squad for a 2–0 win over Crewe Alexandra on 17 April 2021, coming on as an 89th-minute substitute. He scored five goals in 20 appearances during the 2020–21 campaign.

=== Swansea City ===
On 11 June 2021, it was announced that Joseph had agreed to join Swansea City on a four-year deal, with Swansea paying a compensation fee of around £500,000 plus add-ons. He made his debut for the club on 10 August 2021 in a 3–0 EFL Cup win over Reading.

==== Cheltenham Town (loan) ====
After two appearances for Swansea, he joined League One club Cheltenham Town on a season-long loan on 31 August 2021. He scored on his debut for the club with the opening goal of a 1–1 draw with Milton Keynes Dons on 4 September 2021. He scored two goals in a 3–1 win over Morecambe on 19 October 2021. He scored four goals in 19 league matches before being recalled from his loan on 5 January 2022. He made ten Championship appearances for Swansea in the second half of the 2021–22 season, all of them as a substitute.

==== Oxford United (loan) ====
In August 2022, Joseph joined Oxford United of League One on a season-long loan. He made 41 appearances for the club in the 2022–23 season, scoring ten goals (nine of them in league fixtures).

=== Blackpool ===
Joseph joined Blackpool on a permanent deal in July 2023.

=== Hull City ===
On 20 January 2025, Joseph joined Hull City for an undisclosed fee believed to be around £2.5 million. On 24 January, he made his first start for the club in the 3–0 away win against Sheffield United. Joseph scored his first goal for Hull eight months later, on 30 August, in a 4–2 defeat away at Bristol City.

=== Middlesbrough ===
On 10 July 2026, Joseph joined Championship club Middlesbrough on a four-year contract for an undisclosed fee.

== International career ==
Joseph has played for Scotland internationally at under-18, under-19 and under-21 levels.

== Style of play ==
Joseph usually plays as a striker, but has also been used as a right wing-back on occasion for Swansea City and Cheltenham Town.

== Career statistics ==
As of 4 November 2026

Appearances and goals by club, season and competition
Club	Season	League			FA Cup		League Cup		Other		Total	
Club	Season	Division	Apps	Goals	Apps	Goals	Apps	Goals	Apps	Goals	Apps	Goals
Wigan Athletic	2020–21	League One	18	5	1	0	0	0	1 (Note: Appearance(s) in EFL Trophy)	0	20	5
Swansea City	2021–22	Championship	10	0	0	0	2	0	—		12	0
Swansea City	2022–23	Championship	0	0	0	0	0	0	—		0	0
Swansea City	Total		10	0	0	0	2	0	—		12	0
Cheltenham Town (loan)	2021–22	League One	19	4	3	0	0	0	0	0	22	4
Oxford United (loan)	2022–23	League One	37	9	0	0	1	0	3	1	41	10
Blackpool	2023–24	League One	30	1	3	1	1	0	3	0	37	2
Blackpool	2024–25	League One	24	8	2	0	3	0	0	0	29	8
Blackpool	Total		54	9	5	1	4	0	3	0	66	10
Hull City	2024–25	Championship	16	0	—		—		—		16	0
Hull City	2025–26	Championship	44	8	2	0	1	0	2 (Note: Appearances in EFL Championship play-offs)	0	49	8
Hull City	Total		60	8	2	0	1	0	2	0	65	8
Middlesbrough	2026–27	Championship	13	0	0	0	2	1	0	0	15	1
Career total			211	35	11	1	10	1	9	1	241	38
