= 2026–27 Olympique de Marseille season =

Olympique de Marseille
2026–27 season
- President: Stéphane Richard
- Head coach: Bruno Génésio
- Stadium: Stade Vélodrome
- Ligue 1: 4th
- Coupe de France: Round of 64
- UEFA Europa League: League phase
- Top goalscorer: League: Amine Gouiri (7); All: Amine Gouiri (8)
Home colours	Away colours	Third colours

The 2026–27 season is the 121st season in the history of Olympique de Marseille, and the club's 31st consecutive season in the French top flight. The club is participating in Ligue 1, the Coupe de France and the UEFA Europa League. The season covers the period from 1 July 2026 to 30 June 2027.

== Players ==
=== First-team squad ===
As of 5 September 2026

Note: Flags indicate national team as defined under FIFA eligibility rules; some limited exceptions apply. Players may hold more than one non-FIFA nationality.

No.	Pos.	Nation	Player
1	GK	NED	Jeffrey de Lange
4	DF	ENG	CJ Egan-Riley
6	MF	NGR	Tochukwu Nnadi
7	MF	ENG	Angel Gomes
8	MF	ALG	Himad Abdelli
9	FW	ALG	Amine Gouiri
11	FW	FRA	Neal Maupay
13	DF	CAN	Derek Cornelius
14	FW	BRA	Igor Paixão
18	DF	CIV	Bamo Meïté
19	MF	CAF	Geoffrey Kondogbia

No.	Pos.	Nation	Player
21	DF	MAR	Nayef Aguerd
22	FW	USA	Timothy Weah (captain)
23	MF	DEN	Pierre-Emile Højbjerg
25	DF	SUI	Ulisses Garcia
29	FW	CMR	Faris Moumbagna
33	DF	ITA	Emerson
40	GK	BEL	Jelle Van Neck
43	MF	FRA	Tadjidine Mmadi
48	MF	FRA	Keyliane Abdallah
77	MF	MAR	Amine Harit
92	GK	FRA	Théo Vermot

== Transfers ==
=== In ===
No.	Pos.	Player	Transferred from	Fee	Date	Source

Total expenditure: ▼€0 million (excluding any other fees)

=== Out ===
No.	Pos.	Player	Transferred to	Fee	Date	Source

Total income: ▲€0 million (excluding add-ons, bonuses and undisclosed figures)

== Competitions ==
=== Overall record ===
Competition	First match	Last match	Starting round	Final position	Record							
Competition	First match	Last match	Starting round	Final position	Pld	W	D	L	GF	GA	GD	Win %
Ligue 1	21 August 2026	29 May 2027	Matchday 1	TBD	10	6	0	4	22	14	+8	60.00
Coupe de France	18–21 December 2026	TBD	Round of 64	TBD	0	0	0	0	0	0	+0	—
UEFA Europa League	17 September 2026	TBD	League phase	TBD	4	1	0	3	2	6	−4	25.00
Total					14	7	0	7	24	20	+4	50.00

Last updated: 8 November 2026
Source: Soccerway

=== Ligue 1 ===
==== League table ====
Pos	Team	Pld	W	D	L	GF	GA	GD	Pts	Qualification or relegation
3	Lille	11	6	3	2	14	8	+6	21	Qualification for the Champions League league phase
4	Lyon	11	6	2	3	16	9	+7	20	Qualification for the Champions League third qualifying round
5	Marseille	11	6	0	5	24	17	+7	18	Qualification for the Europa League league phase (Note: The 2026–27 Coupe de France winners also qualify for the Europa League league phase (or the sixth-placed team if the Coupe de France winners finish in the top five). If the Coupe de France winners finish in the top six, the Conference League spot will be passed to the seventh-placed team.)
6	Brest	11	5	3	3	19	12	+7	18	Qualification for the Conference League play-off round
7	Nice	11	5	2	4	17	15	+2	17	

Updated to match(es) played on 22 November 2026. Source: Ligue 1
Rules for classification: 1) Points; 2) Goal difference; 3) Head-to-head points; 4) Head-to-head goal difference; 5) Goals scored; 6) Wins; 7) Away wins; 8) Fair-play points; 9) Drawing of lots.
(Note: Head-to-head record is used only after all the matches between the teams in question have been played).

==== Results summary ====
Overall								Home						Away					
Pld	W	D	L	GF	GA	GD	Pts	W	D	L	GF	GA	GD	W	D	L	GF	GA	GD
11	6	0	5	24	17	+7	18	3	0	3	15	11	+4	3	0	2	9	6	+3

Last updated: 22 November 2026.
Source: Ligue 1

==== Results by round ====
Round	1	2	3	4	5	6	7	8	9	10	11	12	13	14	15	16	17	18	19	20	21	22	23	24	25	26	27	28	29	30	31	32	33	34
Ground	H	A	H	A	H	A	A	H	H	A	H	A	H	A	A	H	A	H	A	H	A	H	A	H	H	A	H	A	H	A	A	H	A	H
Result	W	L	L	L	L	W	W	W	W	W	L																							
Position	1	8	10	13	17	13	9	8	6	4	5																							

Updated to match(es) played on 22 November 2026. Source: Ligue 1
A = Away; H = Home; W = Win; D = Draw; L = Loss

==== Matches ====
The match schedule was released on 10 June 2026.

21 August 2026 1	Marseille	4–0	Strasbourg	Marseille
20:45 CEST (UTC+2)	Gouiri 46', 68' (pen.); Aguerd (yellow card) 79'; Abdallah 89'; Højbjerg 90+6'	Report	Amo-Ameyaw (yellow card) 48' (yellow-red card) 59'; Mara (yellow card) 61'	Stadium: Stade Vélodrome; Attendance: 65,089; Referee: Ruddy Buquet

30 August 2026 2	Monaco	2–0	Marseille	Monaco
20:45 CEST (UTC+2)	Brunner 13', 53'; Zakaria (yellow card) 42'; Camara (yellow card) 43'; Nazinho (yellow card) 88'; Hradecky (yellow card) 90+2'	Report		Stadium: Stade Louis II; Attendance: 7,080; Referee: Willy Delajod

6 September 2026 3	Marseille	2–3	Paris FC	Marseille
20:45 CEST (UTC+2)	Gouiri 8', 53'	Report	Sinayoko 1', 19', 86' (pen.), (yellow card) 87'; Matondo (yellow card) 65'	Stadium: Stade Vélodrome; Attendance: 55,955; Referee: Clément Turpin

13 September 2026 4	Rennes	1–0	Marseille	Rennes
20:45 CEST (UTC+2)	Frankowski (yellow card) 43'; Thomasson 52'	Report	Abdelli (yellow card) 33'; Paixão (yellow card) 43'; Harit (yellow card) 85'; Weah (yellow card) 90+4'	Stadium: Roazhon Park; Attendance: 28,384; Referee: Jérémy Stinat

20 September 2026 5	Marseille	1–2	Paris Saint-Germain	Marseille
20:45 CEST (UTC+2)	Weah (yellow card) 32' (yellow-red card) 77'; Gomes 72', (yellow card) 90'; Abdallah (yellow card) 81'	Report	Mendes (yellow card) 39'; Torres 66'; Marquinhos 74'	Stadium: Stade Vélodrome; Attendance: 61,499; Referee: François Letexier

11 October 2026 6	Troyes	0–2	Marseille	Troyes
20:45 CEST (UTC+2)	Maronnier (yellow card) 22'; Karim (yellow card) 58'; Mille (yellow card) 88'; Beach (yellow card) 90+6'	Report	Angel Gomes (yellow card) 45'; Harit 50'; Abdelli 90+8' (pen.)	Stadium: Stade de l'Aube; Attendance: 19,022; Referee: Guillaume Paradis

18 October 2026 7	Angers	2–5	Marseille	Angers
15:00 CEST (UTC+2)	Raolisoa 14'; Biumla (yellow card) 68'; El Ouazzani 75' (pen.)	Report	Abdelli 37'; Kamissoko 43'; Gouiri (penalty missed) 59', 60'; Nnadi (yellow card) 74'; Harit 83'; Paixão 87'	Stadium: Stade Raymond Kopa; Attendance: 10,553; Referee: Jérémie Pignard

25 October 2026 8	Marseille	4–3	Le Havre	Marseille
17:15 CEST (UTC+2)	Egan-Riley 5'; Weah 33'; Paixão 50'; Abdelli 55'; Maupay (yellow card) 90+12'	Report	Maja 77' (pen.), 89'; Ebonog (yellow card) 83'; N'Diaye 86', (yellow card) 90+1'; Seko (yellow card) 90+10'	Stadium: Stade Vélodrome; Attendance: 51,767; Referee: Clément Turpin

1 November 2026 9	Marseille	2–0	Toulouse	Marseille
20:45 CET (UTC+1)	Harit 1'; Gouiri 25'; Højbjerg (yellow card) 44'; Egan-Riley (yellow card) 78'	Report	Hidalgo (yellow card) 86'	Stadium: Stade Vélodrome; Attendance: 39,094; Referee: Hakim Ben El Hadj

8 November 2026 10	Lens	1–2	Marseille	Lens
20:45 CET (UTC+1)	Thauvin 20'; Titraoui (yellow card) 79'	Report	Gouiri 2', (yellow card) 81'; Abdallah 82'; De Lange (yellow card) 90+2'	Stadium: Stade Bollaert-Delelis; Attendance: 38,170; Referee: Willy Delajod

22 November 2026 11	Marseille	2–3	Le Mans	Marseille
20:45 CET (UTC+1)	Gouiri 33'; Paixão 40'; Nnadi (yellow card) 67'; Kondogbia (yellow card) 69'; Abdelli (yellow card) 80'	Report	Rabillard (yellow card) 53'; Mafouta 70', (penalty missed) 79'; Voyer (yellow card) 71'; Bamba (yellow card) 80'; Colas 84'; Traoré (yellow card) 88'; Vercruysse 90+5'	Stadium: Stade Vélodrome; Referee: Éric Wattellier

29 November 2026 12	Auxerre	v	Marseille	Auxerre
15:00 CET (UTC+1)		Report		Stadium: Stade de l'Abbé-Deschamps

6 December 2026 13	Marseille	v	Nice	Marseille
20:45 CET (UTC+1)		Report		Stadium: Stade Vélodrome

13 December 2026 14	Lyon	v	Marseille	Décines-Charpieu
20:45 CET (UTC+1)		Report		Stadium: Parc Olympique Lyonnais

2 January 2027 15	Brest	v	Marseille	Brest
17:00 CET (UTC+1)		Report		Stadium: Stade Francis-Le Blé

15 January 2027 16	Marseille	v	Lille	Marseille
20:45 CET (UTC+1)		Report		Stadium: Stade Vélodrome

24 January 2027 17	Lorient	v	Marseille	Lorient
17:15 CET (UTC+1)		Report		Stadium: Stade du Moustoir

31 January 2027 18	Marseille	v	Troyes	Marseille
17:15 CET (UTC+1)		Report		Stadium: Stade Vélodrome

7 February 2027 19	Paris Saint-Germain	v	Marseille	Paris
20:45 CET (UTC+1)		Report		Stadium: Parc des Princes

13 February 2027 20	Marseille	v	Angers	Marseille
--:-- CET (UTC+1)		Report		Stadium: Stade Vélodrome

20 February 2027 21	Strasbourg	v	Marseille	Strasbourg
--:-- CET (UTC+1)		Report		Stadium: Stade de la Meinau

27 February 2027 22	Marseille	v	Rennes	Marseille
--:-- CET (UTC+1)		Report		Stadium: Stade Vélodrome

6 March 2027 23	Lille	v	Marseille	Villeneuve-d'Ascq
--:-- CET (UTC+1)		Report		Stadium: Stade Pierre-Mauroy

13 March 2027 24	Marseille	v	Monaco	Marseille
--:-- CET (UTC+1)		Report		Stadium: Stade Vélodrome

20 March 2027 25	Marseille	v	Lyon	Marseille
--:-- CET (UTC+1)		Report		Stadium: Stade Vélodrome

3 April 2027 26	Le Mans	v	Marseille	Le Mans
--:-- CEST (UTC+2)		Report		Stadium: Stade Marie-Marvingt

10 April 2027 27	Marseille	v	Brest	Marseille
--:-- CET (UTC+2)		Report		Stadium: Stade Vélodrome

17 April 2027 28	Le Havre	v	Marseille	Le Havre
--:-- CEST (UTC+2)		Report		Stadium: Stade Océane

24 April 2027 29	Marseille	v	Auxerre	Marseille
--:-- CET (UTC+2)		Report		Stadium: Stade Vélodrome

1 May 2027 30	Toulouse	v	Marseille	Toulouse
--:-- CEST (UTC+2)		Report		Stadium: Stadium de Toulouse

8 March 2027 31	Nice	v	Marseille	Nice
--:-- CEST (UTC+2)		Report		Stadium: Allianz Riviera

16 May 2027 32	Marseille	v	Lens	Marseille
--:-- CEST (UTC+2)		Report		Stadium: Stade Vélodrome

22 May 2027 33	Paris FC	v	Marseille	Paris
21:00 CEST (UTC+2)		Report		Stadium: Stade Jean-Bouin

29 May 2027 34	Marseille	v	Lorient	Marseille
21:00 CEST (UTC+2)		Report		Stadium: Stade Vélodrome

=== UEFA Europa League ===
==== League phase ====
The draw for the league phase was held on 28 August 2026.

Pos	Team	Pld	W	D	L	GF	GA	GD	Pts
29	(Poland) Jagiellonia Białystok	4	1	0	3	4	7	−3	3
30	(Czech Republic) Viktoria Plzeň	4	1	0	3	3	7	−4	3
31	(France) Marseille	4	1	0	3	2	6	−4	3
32	(Scotland) Celtic	4	1	0	3	6	11	−5	3
33	(Israel) Hapoel Be'er Sheva	4	0	1	3	1	8	−7	1

Updated to match(es) played on 5 November 2026. Source: UEFA
Rules for classification: League phase tiebreakers

Round	1	2	3	4	5	6	7	8
Ground	A	H	A	A	H	H	A	H
Result	L	L	L	W				
Position	32	31	34	31				

Updated to match(es) played on 5 November 2026. Source: UEFA
A = Away; H = Home; W = Win; D = Draw; L = Loss

17 September 2026 1	Beşiktaş (Turkey)	4–1	(France) Marseille	Istanbul, Turkey
22:00 TRT (UTC+3)	Agbadou (yellow card) 10'; Fakılı 15'; Černý 56'; Murillo 59'; Poku 81'; Miretti (yellow card) 90+5'	Report	Abdallah 30'; Harit (yellow card) 72'	Stadium: Beşiktaş Stadium; Attendance: 39,831; Referee: Andrea Colombo (Italy)

15 October 2026 2	Marseille (France)	0–1	(Greece) Olympiacos	Marseille, France
21:00 CEST (UTC+2)	Abdallah (yellow card) 36'; Meïté (yellow card) 77'	Report	Hezze 42'; Retsos (yellow card) 43'; Onyemaechi (yellow card) 60'	Stadium: Stade Vélodrome; Attendance: 57,051; Referee: Michael Oliver (England)

22 October 2026 3	Sturm Graz (Austria)	1–0	(France) Marseille	Graz, Austria
18:45 CEST (UTC+2)	Diakité 13', (yellow card) 33'; Weinhandl (yellow card) 63'; Malić (yellow card) 84'	Report	Gomes (yellow card) 24'; Gouiri (yellow card) 80'; Meïté (yellow card) 90+1'	Stadium: Liebenauer Stadium; Attendance: 14,215; Referee: Nenad Minaković (Serbia)

5 November 2026 4	Bayer Leverkusen (Germany)	0–1	(France) Marseille	Leverkusen, Germany
21:00 CET (UTC+1)	Gutiérrez (yellow card) 6'	Report	Paixão (yellow card) 39'; Garcia (yellow card) 54'; Gouiri 77'; Nnadi (yellow card) 90'	Stadium: BayArena; Attendance: 28,758; Referee: Orel Grinfeld (Israel)

26 November 2026 5	Marseille (France)	v	(Bulgaria) Levski Sofia	Marseille, France
18:45 CET (UTC+1)		Report		Stadium: Stade Vélodrome

10 December 2026 6	Marseille (France)	v	(Spain) Celta Vigo	Marseille, France
18:45 CET (UTC+1)		Report		Stadium: Stade Vélodrome

21 January 2027 7	Celtic (Scotland)	v	(France) Marseille	Glasgow, Scotland
20:00 GMT (UTC+0)		Report		Stadium: Celtic Park

28 January 2027 8	Marseille (France)	v	(Belgium) Anderlecht	Marseille, France
21:00 CET (UTC+1)		Report		Stadium: Stade Vélodrome

== Statistics ==
=== Appearances and goals ===
No.	Pos	Nat	Player	Total		Ligue 1		Coupe de France		UEFA Europa League	
No.	Pos	Nat	Player	Apps	Goals	Apps	Goals	Apps	Goals	Apps	Goals
Goalkeepers
1	GK	(Netherlands) NED	Jeffrey de Lange	12	0	9	0	0	0	3	0
40	GK	(Belgium) BEL	Jelle Van Neck	0	0	0	0	0	0	0	0
92	GK	(France) FRA	Théo Vermot	0	0	0	0	0	0	0	0
Defenders
4	DF	(England) ENG	CJ Egan-Riley	11	1	9	1	0	0	1+1	0
13	DF	(Canada) CAN	Derek Cornelius	4	0	0+3	0	0	0	1	0
18	DF	(Ivory Coast) CIV	Bamo Meïté	2	0	0	0	0	0	2	0
21	DF	(Morocco) MAR	Nayef Aguerd	12	0	6+3	0	0	0	2+1	0
25	DF	(Switzerland) SUI	Ulisses Garcia	8	0	0+5	0	0	0	2+1	0
33	DF	(Italy) ITA	Emerson	11	0	9	0	0	0	1+1	0
74	DF	(Algeria) ALG	Kelyann Bezahaf	4	0	1+2	0	0	0	1	0
Midfielders
6	MF	(Nigeria) NGR	Tochukwu Nnadi	7	0	3+3	0	0	0	1	0
7	MF	(England) ENG	Angel Gomes	12	1	5+4	1	0	0	3	0
8	MF	(Algeria) ALG	Himad Abdelli	11	3	9	3	0	0	1+1	0
19	MF	(Central African Republic) CAF	Geoffrey Kondogbia	8	0	3+2	0	0	0	2+1	0
23	MF	(Denmark) DEN	Pierre-Emile Højbjerg	9	1	7	1	0	0	1+1	0
42	MF	(France) FRA	Nouhoum Kamissoko	4	1	2+1	1	0	0	1	0
43	MF	(France) FRA	Tadjidine Mmadi	3	0	0+2	0	0	0	0+1	0
77	MF	(Morocco) MAR	Amine Harit	11	2	9	2	0	0	1+1	0
Forwards
9	FW	(Algeria) ALG	Amine Gouiri	12	6	9	6	0	0	1+2	0
11	FW	(France) FRA	Neal Maupay	11	0	1+7	0	0	0	3	0
14	FW	(Brazil) BRA	Igor Paixão	11	2	8	2	0	0	1+2	0
22	FW	(United States) USA	Timothy Weah	11	1	8	1	0	0	2+1	0
29	FW	(Cameroon) CMR	Faris Moumbagna	6	0	0+5	0	0	0	0+1	0
48	FW	(France) FRA	Keyliane Abdallah	11	2	0+8	1	0	0	3	1
Players transferred/loaned out during the season
27	MF	(Netherlands) NED	Quinten Timber	1	0	1	0	0	0	0	0

Last updated: 1 November 2026
Source: Competitions
