= Tochukwu Nnadi =

Nigerian footballer

Personal information
- Full name: Tochukwu Nnadi
- Date of birth: 30 June 2003 (age 23)
- Place of birth: Ihiagwa, Owerri West, Nigeria
- Height: 1.76 m (5 ft 9 in)
- Position: Midfielder

Team information
- Current team: Marseille
- Number: 6

Youth career
- –2019: Campos FC
- 2019–2021: Madenat Alamal Football Academy

Senior career*
Years	Team	Apps	(Gls)
2021–2022	Botev Plovdiv II	13	(1)
2021–2024	Botev Plovdiv	42	(0)
2024–2026	Zulte Waregem	54	(1)
2026–	Marseille	16	(0)

International career^{‡}
2023–2024	Nigeria U20	5	(0)
2025–	Nigeria	7	(0)
Medal record
Men's football
Representing Nigeria
Africa Cup of Nations
Third place	2025 Morocco
- * Club domestic league appearances and goals as of 22 November 2026 ‡ National team caps and goals as of 17:15, 17 November 2026 (UTC)

Tochukwu Nnadi (born 30 June 2003) is a Nigerian professional footballer who plays as a midfielder for Ligue 1 club Marseille and the Nigeria national team.

== Club career ==
Nnadi was born in Ihiagwa, in the Owerri West Local Government Area of Imo State, Nigeria. He played football as a youngster with Campos FC in Owerri. In 2019, he began to train with Madenat Alamal Football Academy in Dubai. After a successful trial, he joined Botev Plovdiv in August 2021. He agreed a contract with the Bulgarian side until 2025. He made his league debut in the Bulgarian First League on 3 April 2022, away at Ludogorets. In his first season in Europe he made 19 league appearances for Botev Plovdiv, with 29 appearances coming in all competitions.

On 19 January 2024, he joined Belgian Pro League side Zulte Waregem.

On 2 February 2026, Nnadi signed for French club Olympique de Marseille until June 2030. He made his debut for OM on 1 March 2026 in a Ligue 1 match against Lyon, coming on as a substitute for Mason Greenwood.

== International career ==
Nnadi represented Nigeria U-20 at the 2023 FIFA U-20 World Cup, appearing in all five of their matches including wins over Italy U-20 and Argentina U-20.

He was called up to the Nigeria national football team for the 2025 Africa Cup of Nations. Nnadi made his international debut for Nigeria during the AFCON group stage match against Uganda, replacing Paul Onuachu.

== Style of play ==
A fan of Manchester United, Nnadi has said to try modelling his game to former central midfield player Michael Carrick, and expressed admiration for current top defensive midfielders Moisés Caicedo, N'Golo Kanté, Sofyan Amrabat, and Wilfred Ndidi.

He described his style of play as being "calm with the ball and aggressive without", noting a preference for short passes over long ones to maintain possession.

== Career statistics ==
=== Club ===
As of match played 18 October 2026

Appearances and goals by club, season and competition
Club	Season	League			National cup		Europe		Other		Total	
Club	Season	Division	Apps	Goals	Apps	Goals	Apps	Goals	Apps	Goals	Apps	Goals
Botev Plovdiv II	2021–22	Bulgarian Second League	7	1	–		–		–		7	1
Botev Plovdiv II	2022–23	Bulgarian Second League	6	0	–		–		–		6	0
Botev Plovdiv II	Total		13	1	–		–		–		13	1
Botev Plovdiv	2021–22	Bulgarian First League	6	0	–		–		–		6	0
Botev Plovdiv	2022–23	Bulgarian First League	19	0	2	0	2 (Note: Appearances in UEFA Europa Conference League)	0	–		23	0
Botev Plovdiv	2023–24	Bulgarian First League	17	0	2	0	–		–		19	0
Botev Plovdiv	Total		42	0	4	0	2	0	–		48	0
Zulte Waregem	2023–24	Challenger Pro League	13	1	–		–		–		13	1
Zulte Waregem	2024–25	Challenger Pro League	23	0	3	0	–		–		26	0
Zulte Waregem	2025–26	Challenger Pro League	18	0	1	0	–		–		19	0
Zulte Waregem	Total		54	1	4	0	–		–		58	1
Marseille	2025–26	Ligue 1	8	0	0	0	–		–		8	0
Marseille	2026–27	Ligue 1	4	0	0	0	1 (Note: Appearances in UEFA Europa League)	0	–		5	0
Marseille	Total		12	0	0	0	1	0	–		13	0
Career total			121	2	8	0	3	0	0	0	132	2

=== International ===
As of match played 17 November 2026

Appearances and goals by national team and year
National team	Year	Apps	Goals
Nigeria	2025	1	0
Nigeria	2026	6	0
Total		7	0

== Honours ==
Nigeria

- Africa Cup of Nations third place: 2025
