= Robert Louis-Dreyfus Trophy =

Robert Louis-Dreyfus trophy
- Founded: 2010
- Region: Europe
- Teams: 2
- Current champions: Olympique de Marseille
- Most championships: Olympique de Marseille (2 titles)

The Robert Louis-Dreyfus Trophy (French: Trophée Robert Louis-Dreyfus) was a summer tournament hosted by Olympique de Marseille in dedication to Robert Louis-Dreyfus, a majority shareholder of the French football team, who died on 4 July 2009 following a long battle with leukemia.

The inaugural competition took place in 2010 where Marseille were joined by Valencia CF. The second and final edition was played on 1 August 2015 against Juventus. The competition did not take place between 2011 and 2014 because of the ongoing renovations to the Stade Vélodrome. The tournament was discontinued after two editions.

== 2010 edition ==
The inaugural edition of the Robert Louis-Dreyfus Trophy was played on 1 August 2010 between hosts Marseille and Valencia, who had ended third in the 2009–10 La Liga season. A solitary goal from Hatem Ben Arfa saw Marseille triumph 1–0.

1 August 2010
21:00 CEST

(France) Olympique de Marseille	1 – 0	(Spain) Valencia CF
Hatem Ben Arfa 78'	(Report)

Stade Vélodrome, Marseille
Attendance: 28 370
Referee: (France) Nicolas Rainville

== 2015 edition ==
The second edition of the tournament was played on 1 August 2015, a week before the 2015-16 Ligue 1 season began. Marseille hosted reigning Serie A champions and UEFA Champions League runners-up Juventus and won the match 2-0 thanks to goals by Romain Alessandrini and Abdelaziz Barrada.

1 August 2015
21:00 CEST

(France) Olympique de Marseille	2 – 0	(Italy) Juventus
Romain Alessandrini 35'; Abdelaziz Barrada 84'	(Report)

Stade Vélodrome, Marseille
Attendance: 64 020
Referee: (France) Tony Chapron

== Titles by team ==
Team	Appearances	Titles
(France) Olympique de Marseille	2 (2010, 2015)	2
(Italy) Juventus	1 (2015)	0
(Spain) Valencia CF	1 (2010)	0

== Goalscorers ==
Pos	Player	Team	Goals	Edition in which scored
1.	(France) Hatem Ben Arfa	(France) Olympique de Marseille	1	2010
1.	(France) Romain Alessandrini	(France) Olympique de Marseille	1	2015
1.	(Morocco) Abdelaziz Barrada	(France) Olympique de Marseille	1	2015
