= Jeffrey de Lange =

Dutch footballer (born 1998)

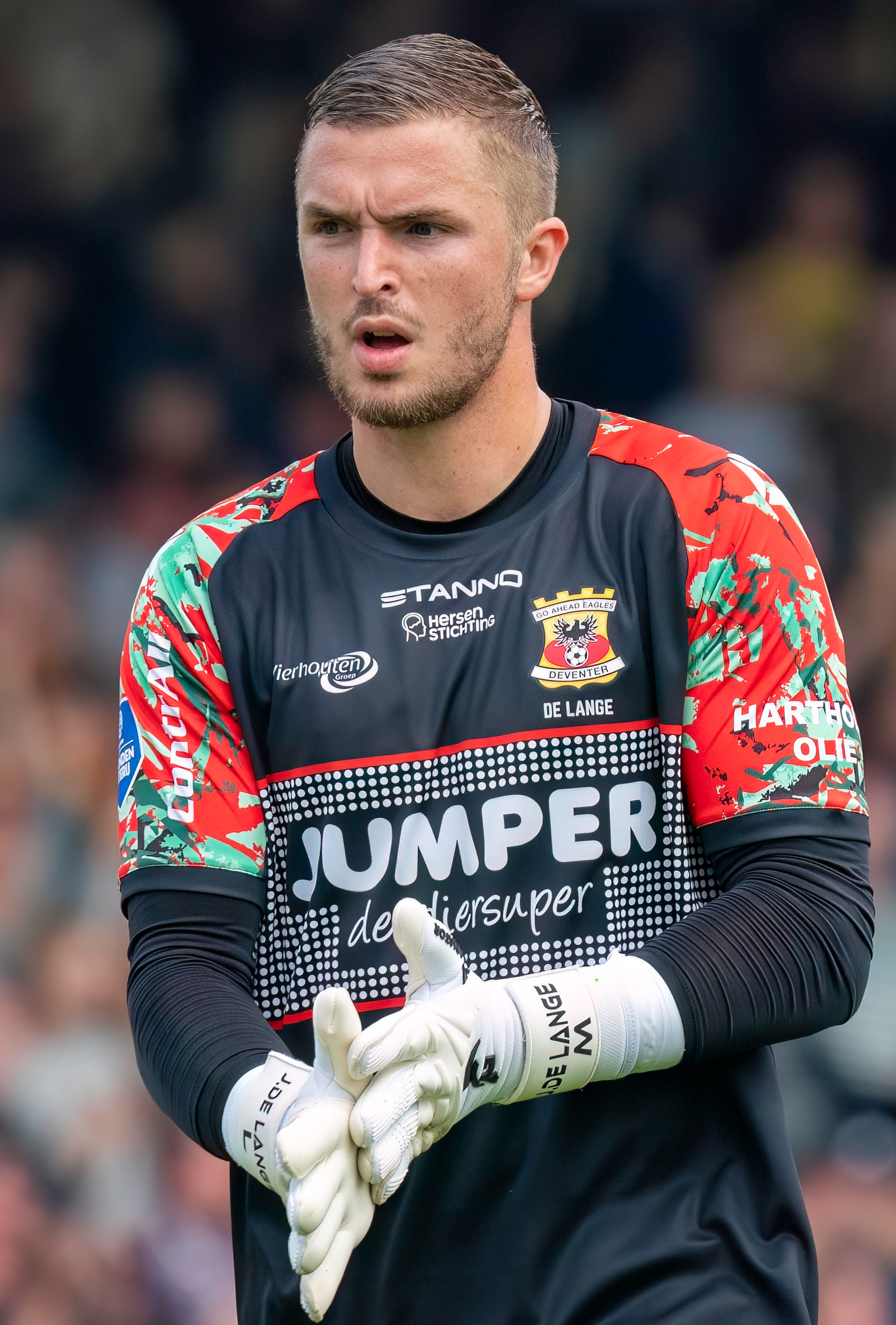
- De Lange with Go Ahead Eagles in 2023

Personal information
- Date of birth: 1 April 1998 (age 28)
- Place of birth: Amstelveen, Netherlands
- Height: 1.91 m (6 ft 3 in)
- Position: Goalkeeper

Team information
- Current team: Marseille
- Number: 1

Youth career
- 2004–2005: PAVITO DOMADO
- 2005–2006: Zwanenburg
- 2006–2017: Ajax
- 2017–2018: Twente

Senior career*
Years	Team	Apps	(Gls)
2018–2022	Twente	2	(0)
2022–2024	Go Ahead Eagles	68	(0)
2024–	Marseille	16	(0)

International career
2013	Netherlands U15	1	(0)
2013–2014	Netherlands U16	3	(0)
2014	Netherlands U17	3	(0)
2015	Netherlands U18	3	(0)
2017	Netherlands U20	2	(0)
- * Club domestic league appearances and goals as of 21:43, 22 November 2026 (UTC)

Jeffrey de Lange (born 1 April 1998) is a Dutch professional footballer who plays as a goalkeeper for Ligue 1 club Marseille.

== Career ==
De Lange is a youth product of Ajax, and began his career as the reserve goalkeeper at Jong Ajax. On 14 April 2017, he transferred to FC Twente. He made his professional debut with Twente in a 3–1 KNVB Cup loss to De Graafschap on 27 October 2020.

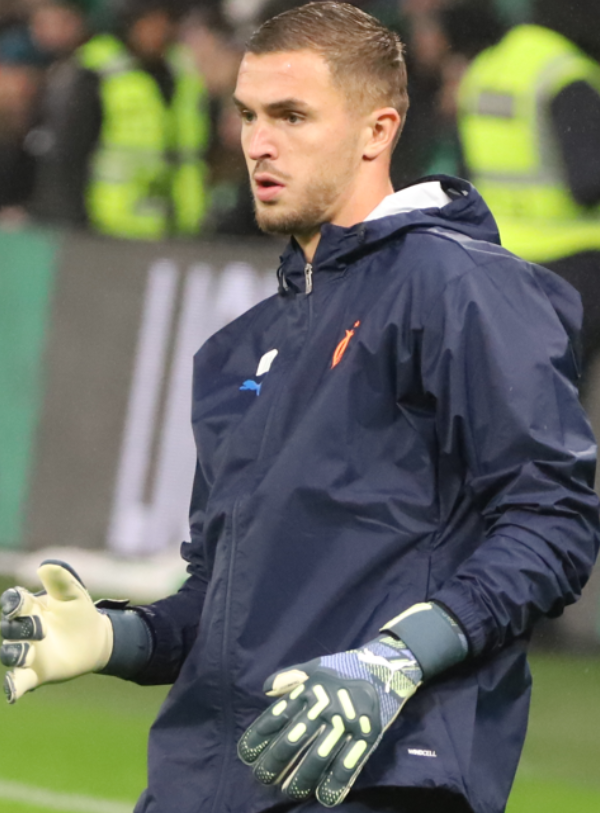
De Lange training with Marseille in 2024

On 15 June 2022, de Lange signed a three-year deal with Go Ahead Eagles.

In August 2024, de Lange joined Marseille for a fee of €2 million.

== Career statistics ==
=== Club ===
As of 8 November 2026

Appearances and goals by club, season and competition
Club	Season	League			Cup		Continental		Other		Total	
Club	Season	Division	Apps	Goals	Apps	Goals	Apps	Goals	Apps	Goals	Apps	Goals
FC Twente	2020–21	Eredivisie	0	0	1	0	—		—		1	0
FC Twente	2021–22	Eredivisie	2	0	0	0	—		—		2	0
FC Twente	Total		2	0	1	0	—		—		3	0
Go Ahead Eagles	2022–23	Eredivisie	34	0	2	0	—		—		36	0
Go Ahead Eagles	2023–24	Eredivisie	34	0	2	0	—		2 (Note: Appearances in European play-offs)	0	38	0
Go Ahead Eagles	2024–25	Eredivisie	—		—		2 (Note: Appearances in UEFA Conference League)	0	—		2	0
Go Ahead Eagles	Total		68	0	4	0	2	0	2	0	76	0
Marseille	2025–26	Ligue 1	5	0	3	0	0	0	0	0	8	0
Marseille	2026–27	Ligue 1	10	0	0	0	4 (Note: Appearances in UEFA Europa League)	0	—		14	0
Marseille	Total		15	0	3	0	4	0	0	0	22	0
Career total			85	0	8	0	7	0	2	0	101	0
