= Pierre-Emile Højbjerg =

Danish footballer (born 1995)

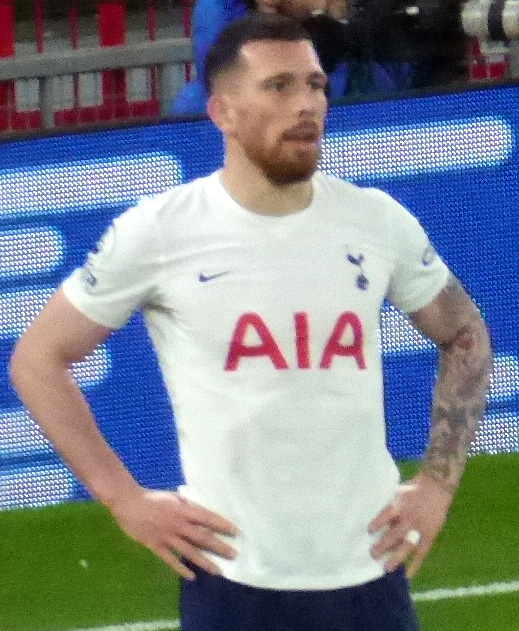
- Højbjerg playing for Tottenham Hotspur in 2022

Personal information
- Full name: Pierre-Emile Kordt Højbjerg
- Date of birth: 5 August 1995 (age 31)
- Place of birth: Copenhagen, Denmark
- Height: 1.87 m (6 ft 2 in)
- Position: Defensive midfielder

Team information
- Current team: Marseille
- Number: 23

Youth career
- 2003–2007: Skjold
- 2007–2009: KB
- 2009–2012: Brøndby

Senior career*
Years	Team	Apps	(Gls)
2012–2014	Bayern Munich II	44	(12)
2013–2016	Bayern Munich	17	(0)
2015	→ FC Augsburg (loan)	16	(2)
2015–2016	→ Schalke 04 (loan)	23	(0)
2016–2020	Southampton	109	(4)
2020–2025	Tottenham Hotspur	145	(8)
2024–2025	→ Marseille (loan)	30	(2)
2025–	Marseille	40	(5)

International career^{‡}
2010–2011	Denmark U16	6	(0)
2011–2012	Denmark U17	18	(5)
2012–2013	Denmark U19	6	(3)
2013–2015	Denmark U21	8	(4)
2014–	Denmark	103	(13)
- * Club domestic league appearances and goals as of 22:01, 8 November 2026 (UTC) ‡ National team caps and goals as of 22:50, 17 November 2026 (UTC)

Pierre-Emile Kordt Højbjerg (born 5 August 1995) is a Danish professional footballer who plays as a defensive midfielder for Ligue 1 club Marseille and captains the Denmark national team.

Højbjerg started his career as a youth for Danish clubs Skjold, KB and Brøndby, before joining German club Bayern Munich in 2012. He made his senior debut for the reserves that year and his professional debut for the first team in April 2013; at 17 he was the club's youngest player in the Bundesliga. He made 25 total appearances for Bayern and won a variety of domestic and international tournaments, also having loans at fellow league teams FC Augsburg and Schalke 04. In 2016, he signed a five-year contract for Southampton for an estimated £12.8 million fee. After making 134 appearances for the Saints, he joined Tottenham Hotspur in 2020 for a reported initial fee of £15 million. Højbjerg made 184 appearances for Spurs before going on loan to Ligue 1 club Marseille in 2024, who he joined permanently in 2025.

Højbjerg was a youth international at various levels from under-16 to under-21. He made his debut for the Denmark national team in 2014, and represented the side at UEFA Euro 2020, the 2022 FIFA World Cup and Euro 2024.

== Club career ==
=== Early career ===
While initially playing for Skjold and KB he moved to Brøndby as a junior player at age 14. He looks up to Zinedine Zidane as his role model. Aged just 5, Højbjerg began attending training sessions with his six-year-old brother at local club Skjold. He was deployed as a striker by Copenhagen. Starting from his debut, Højbjerg plays as a central midfielder and sometimes right wide midfielder. He has since switched to a defensive midfield role.

In 2011, Højbjerg was honoured with the title "Danish under-17 player of the year". In 2013, he was honoured with the title "Danish talent of the year" by Spillerforeningen.

=== Bayern Munich ===
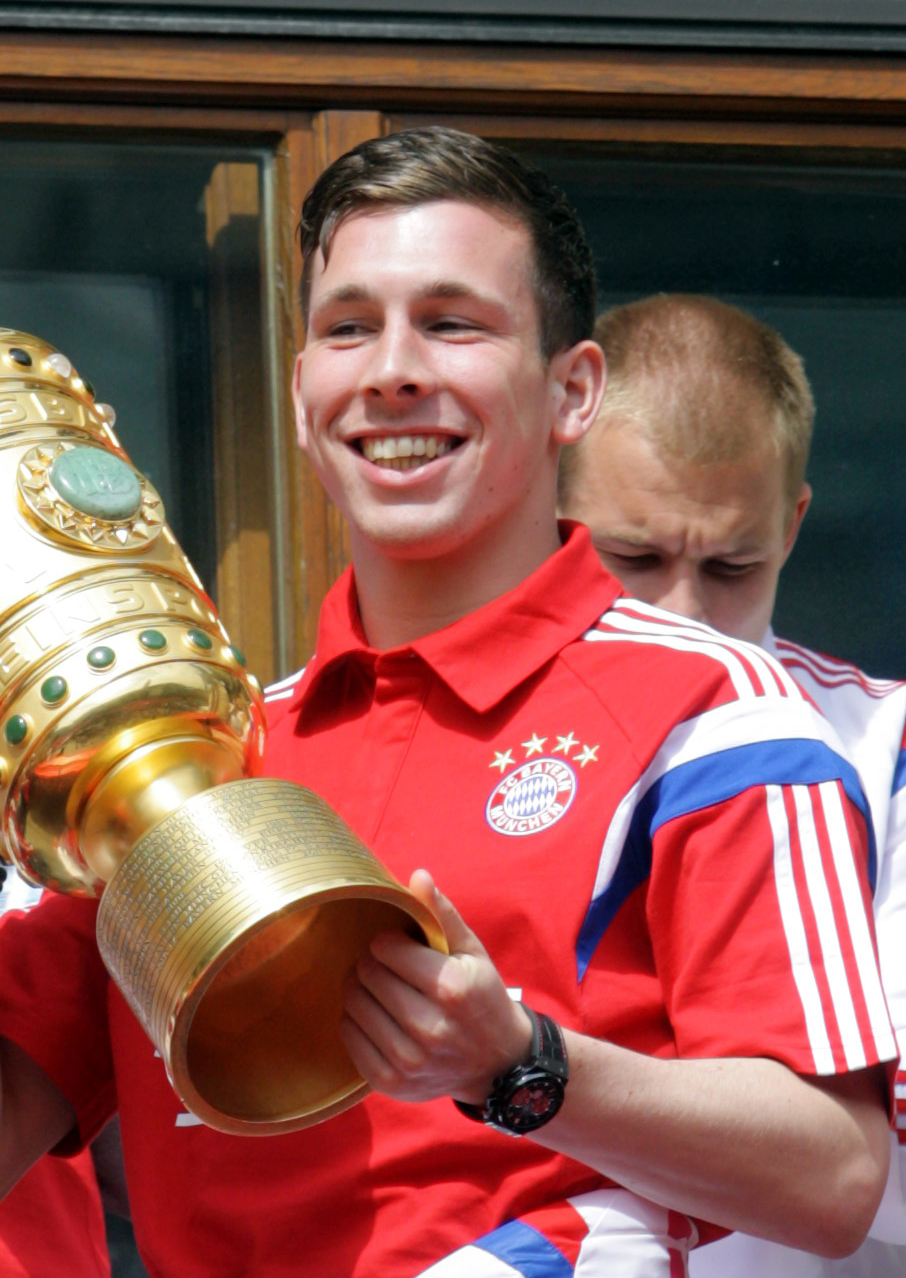
Højbjerg after winning the 2014 DFB-Pokal Final with Bayern Munich

Højbjerg joined Bayern in July 2012 and, at the age of 17 years and 251 days, made his professional debut on 13 April 2013 in the Bundesliga against 1. FC Nürnberg, as a substitute for Xherdan Shaqiri and thus became the youngest player ever to play for the Bayern Munich first team in the Bundesliga. He finished the 2012–13 season with no goals in two matches played for the first team and eight goals in 30 matches played for the reserve team.

In December of that year, he was in the Bayern squad which won the 2013 FIFA Club World Cup in Morocco, although he did not enter the field of play during the tournament. On 17 May 2014, Højbjerg started the DFB-Pokal final for Bayern Munich, a 2–0 extra-time win over Borussia Dortmund. He played for a total of 102 minutes before being substituted in the first half of extra time for Daniel Van Buyten. He finished the 2013–14 season with seven Bundesliga appearances and two German Cup appearances for the first team and four goals from 14 appearances for the reserve team.

His first match of the 2014–15 season was the DFL-Supercup on 13 August, playing the first hour and then being substituted for Mario Götze, as Bayern lost 2–0 at Borussia Dortmund. On 8 January 2015, Bayern extended Højbjerg's contract to 2018. He finished the 2014–15 season with no goals from eight Bundesliga appearances, one German Cup appearance, and three Champions League appearances. On 7 January 2015, Højbjerg was loaned to Bundesliga team FC Augsburg for the remainder of the 2014–15 season. He made his debut on 1 February against 1899 Hoffenheim. Højbjerg scored his first Bundesliga goal on 11 April against Paderborn in a 2–1 loss. On 9 May, he assisted Raúl Bobadilla for the only goal as Augsburg won away at Bayern, who had already won the league by that point. He finished his loan spell with two goals from 16 Bundesliga appearances.

On 28 August 2015, Højbjerg joined fellow Bundesliga side Schalke 04 on a season-long loan. He played 30 games for the Gelsenkirchen-based club, including six in the Europa League, and at the end of the season he told Danish newspaper B.T. that the time had arrived to leave Bayern Munich and become a first-team regular elsewhere.

=== Southampton ===
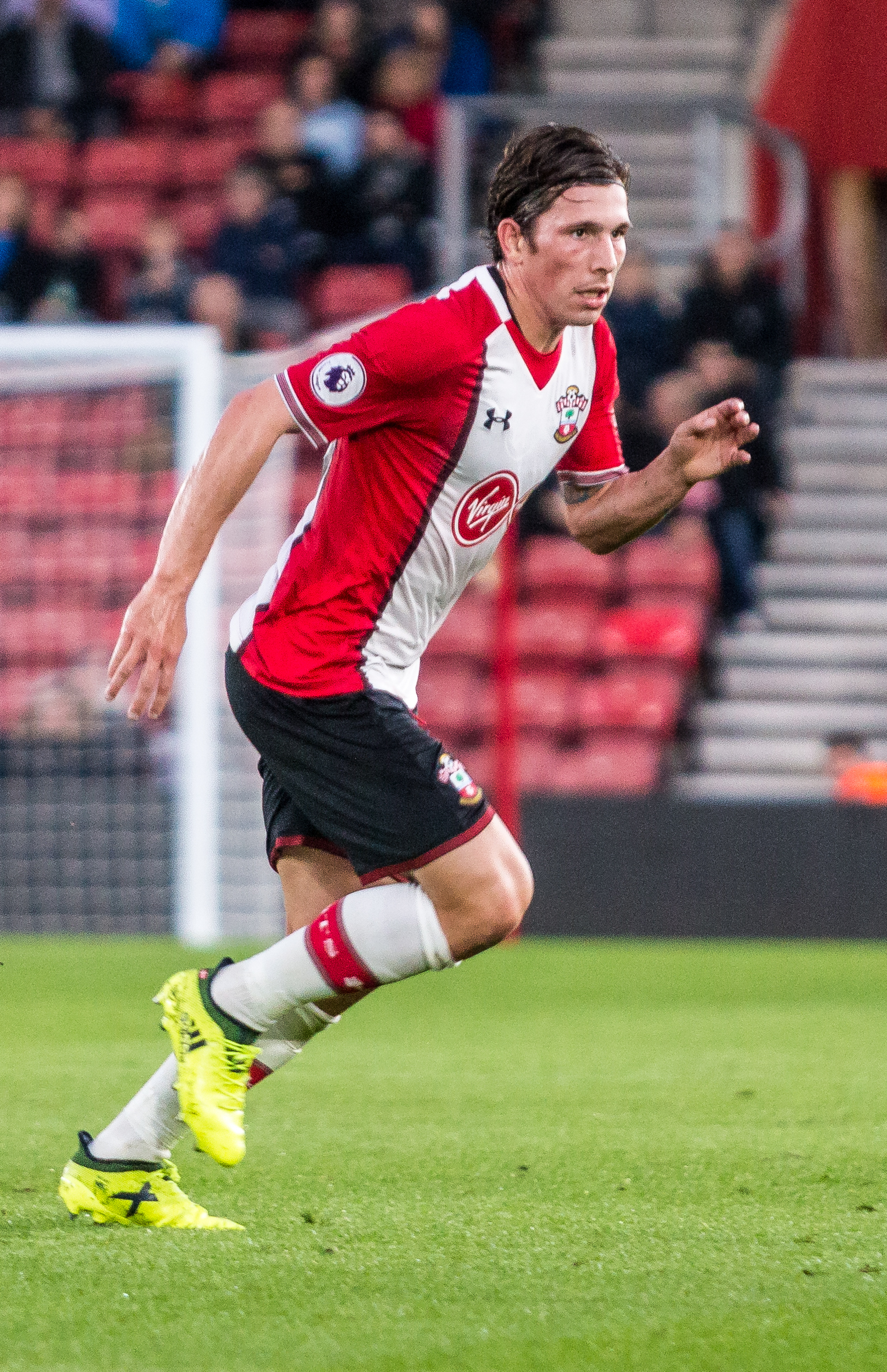
Højbjerg playing for Southampton in 2017

On 11 July 2016, Højbjerg joined English club Southampton on a five-year deal for an estimated fee of £12.8 million. He made his debut in the Premier League on 13 August as the season began with a 1–1 home draw with Watford, coming on in the 55th minute in place of James Ward-Prowse. BBC Sport's Neil Johnston wrote that he "injected pace and urgency" into the Saints, "was not afraid to shoot and was hard-working". Although he played all five matches on the way to the 2017 EFL Cup Final, Højbjerg was an unused substitute in the match at Wembley, which Southampton lost 3–2 to Manchester United.

Højbjerg scored his first goal for the Saints in his 54th match on 18 March 2018, opening a 2–0 win at League One club Wigan Athletic in the sixth round of the FA Cup, the first match under new manager Mark Hughes. In December that year, Hughes' successor Ralph Hasenhüttl made him the Saints' captain. However, in June 2020, Hojbjerg was stripped of the captaincy after publicly speaking about his desire to leave the club, with Ward-Prowse replacing him as captain.

=== Tottenham Hotspur ===
On 11 August 2020, Højbjerg joined Tottenham Hotspur on a five-year deal, for a reported initial fee of £15 million plus add-ons.

He made his debut on 13 September in a 1–0 home defeat by Everton. Despite this early setback, Højbjerg soon became a key member of José Mourinho's squad in the central defensive midfield position, earning wide praise for his performance in many games, as well as receiving a nomination as Premier League Player of the Month for November. On 28 January 2021, Højbjerg scored his first goal for Spurs in the Premier League with a 20-yard strike at a 3–1 home loss to Liverpool. He made the most appearances by a Premier League player in the 2020–21 season (3420 minutes).

On 1 November 2022, he scored a goal in the 95th minute in a 2–1 away win over Marseille, in which Tottenham Hotspur finished top of Group D in the 2022–23 Champions League season.

=== Marseille ===
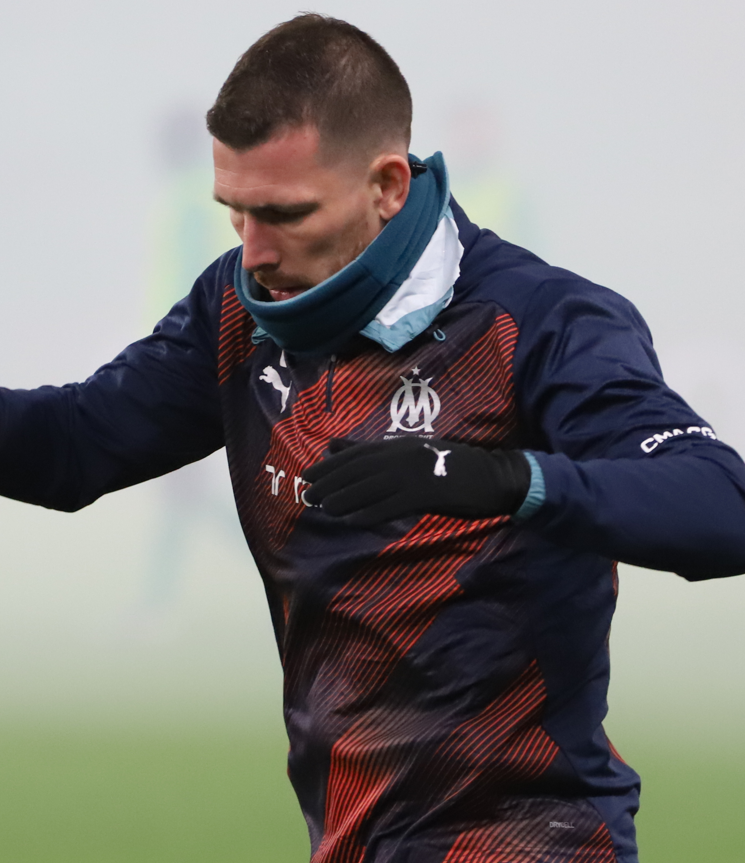
Højbjerg training with Marseille in 2024

On 22 July 2024, Højbjerg joined Marseille on loan for the 2024–25 season, with an "obligation that would see the move become permanent" for a fee reported to be about £17m. His debut came in Marseille's opening fixture of the 2024–25 Ligue 1 season, a 5–1 rout over Brest, in which he played a full 90 minutes. He scored the club's third goal in a 5–0 league victory over Montpellier on 20 October, his first for the club. Despite his limited time at the club, Højbjerg was named as one of the team captains in November.

On 31 May 2025, Højbjerg joined Marseille permanently from Tottenham after his obligation-to-buy clause was activated.

== International career ==
Højbjerg was born in Denmark to a Danish father and French mother. He was called up to the Denmark senior side for the first time in May 2014 for friendlies against Hungary and Sweden and made his debut against Sweden on 28 May, playing the full 90 minutes.

On his third cap on 7 September 2014, Højbjerg scored his first international goal, equalising as Denmark began their UEFA Euro 2016 qualification campaign with a 2–1 win over Armenia in Copenhagen.

In May 2018, he was named in Denmark's preliminary 35-man squad for the 2018 FIFA World Cup in Russia, although he did not make the final 23.

Højbjerg was named in the Danish squad for the delayed UEFA Euro 2020 in June 2021. In their opening match, a 1–0 loss to Finland, he missed a penalty; the game had been stopped and resumed due to Christian Eriksen's medical emergency.

Højbjerg was named captain of the Danish national team in August 2024, after Simon Kjær's international retirement. On 1 October 2026, he made his 100th international appearance in a 4–2 defeat against Portugal during the 2026–27 UEFA Nations League.

== Personal life ==
Højbjerg was born in Copenhagen and grew up in the Østerbro district of the city. He is the second of three children. Højbjerg was introduced to football when he was five years old. Højbjerg's father Christian died of stomach cancer in April 2014, five days after his first start for Bayern.

== Career statistics ==
=== Club ===
As of match played 8 November 2026

Appearances and goals by club, season and competition
Club	Season	League			National cup (Note: Includes DFB-Pokal, FA Cup, Coupe de France)		League cup (Note: Includes EFL Cup)		Europe		Other		Total	
Club	Season	Division	Apps	Goals	Apps	Goals	Apps	Goals	Apps	Goals	Apps	Goals	Apps	Goals
Bayern Munich II	2012–13	Regionalliga Bayern	30	8	—		—		—		—		30	8
Bayern Munich II	2013–14	Regionalliga Bayern	14	4	—		—		—		0	0	14	4
Bayern Munich II	Total		44	12	—		—		—		0	0	44	12
Bayern Munich	2012–13	Bundesliga	2	0	0	0	—		0	0	0	0	2	0
Bayern Munich	2013–14	Bundesliga	7	0	2	0	—		0	0	0	0	9	0
Bayern Munich	2014–15	Bundesliga	8	0	1	0	—		3 (Note: Appearances in UEFA Champions League)	0	1 (Note: Appearance in DFL-Supercup)	0	13	0
Bayern Munich	2015–16	Bundesliga	0	0	1	0	—		—		0	0	1	0
Bayern Munich	Total		17	0	4	0	—		3	0	1	0	25	0
FC Augsburg (loan)	2014–15	Bundesliga	16	2	0	0	—		—		—		16	2
Schalke 04 (loan)	2015–16	Bundesliga	23	0	1	0	—		6 (Note: Appearances in UEFA Europa League)	0	—		30	0
Southampton	2016–17	Premier League	22	0	2	0	5	0	6	0	—		35	0
Southampton	2017–18	Premier League	23	0	5	1	0	0	—		—		28	1
Southampton	2018–19	Premier League	31	4	0	0	2	0	—		—		33	4
Southampton	2019–20	Premier League	33	0	2	0	3	0	—		—		38	0
Southampton	Total		109	4	9	1	10	0	6	0	—		134	5
Tottenham Hotspur	2020–21	Premier League	38	2	2	0	4	0	9	0	—		53	2
Tottenham Hotspur	2021–22	Premier League	36	2	2	0	5	0	5 (Note: Appearances in UEFA Europa Conference League)	1	—		48	3
Tottenham Hotspur	2022–23	Premier League	35	4	1	0	1	0	7	1	—		44	5
Tottenham Hotspur	2023–24	Premier League	36	0	2	0	1	0	—		—		39	0
Tottenham Hotspur	Total		145	8	7	0	11	0	21	2	—		184	10
Marseille (loan)	2024–25	Ligue 1	30	2	2	1	—		—		—		32	3
Marseille	2025–26	Ligue 1	32	4	2	1	—		8	0	1 (Note: Appearance in Trophée des Champions)	0	43	5
Marseille	2026–27	Ligue 1	8	1	0	0	—		3	0	—		11	1
Marseille	Marseille total		70	7	4	1	—		11	0	1	0	86	9
Career total			424	33	25	3	21	0	47	2	2	0	519	38

=== International ===
As of match played 17 November 2026

Appearances and goals by national team and year
National team	Year	Apps	Goals
Denmark	2014	5	1
Denmark	2015	8	0
Denmark	2016	8	0
Denmark	2017	0	0
Denmark	2018	2	0
Denmark	2019	10	2
Denmark	2020	5	0
Denmark	2021	14	1
Denmark	2022	11	1
Denmark	2023	10	2
Denmark	2024	13	4
Denmark	2025	7	0
Denmark	2026	10	2
Total		103	13

As of match played 17 November 2026. Denmark's score listed first, score column indicates score after each Højbjerg goal.

International goals by date, venue, cap, opponent, score, result and competition
No.	Date	Venue	Cap	Opponent	Score	Result	Competition
1	7 September 2014	Parken Stadium, Copenhagen, Denmark	3	Armenia	1–1	2–1	UEFA Euro 2016 qualifying
2	21 March 2019	Fadil Vokrri Stadium, Pristina, Kosovo	24	Kosovo	2–2	2–2	Friendly
3	7 June 2019	Parken Stadium, Copenhagen, Denmark	26	Republic of Ireland	1–0	1–1	UEFA Euro 2020 qualifying
4	31 March 2021	Ernst-Happel-Stadion, Vienna, Austria	40	Austria	3–0	4–0	2022 FIFA World Cup qualification
5	6 June 2022	Ernst-Happel-Stadion, Vienna, Austria	56	Austria	1–0	2–1	2022–23 UEFA Nations League A
6	7 September 2023	Parken Stadium, Copenhagen, Denmark	68	San Marino	1–0	4–0	UEFA Euro 2024 qualifying
7	10 September 2023	Helsinki Olympic Stadium, Helsinki, Finland	69	Finland	1–0	1–0	UEFA Euro 2024 qualifying
8	26 March 2024	Brøndby Stadium, Brøndbyvester, Denmark	75	Faroe Islands	1–0	2–0	Friendly
9	5 June 2024	Parken Stadium, Copenhagen, Denmark	76	Sweden	1–0	2–1	Friendly
10	8 June 2024	Brøndby Stadium, Brøndbyvester, Denmark	77	Norway	1–0	3–1	Friendly
11	5 September 2024	Parken Stadium, Copenhagen, Denmark	82	Switzerland	2–0	2–0	2024–25 UEFA Nations League A
12	14 November 2026	Estádio Municipal de Braga, Braga, Portugal	102	Portugal	1–0	4–1	2026–27 UEFA Nations League A
13	17 November 2026	Parken Stadium, Copenhagen, Denmark	103	Norway	2–0	2–3	2026–27 UEFA Nations League A

== Honours ==
Bayern Munich

- Bundesliga: 2012–13, 2013–14
- DFB-Pokal: 2013–14
- FIFA Club World Cup: 2013
- UEFA Champions League: 2012–13

Southampton

- EFL Cup runner-up: 2016–17

Tottenham Hotspur

- EFL Cup runner-up: 2020–21

Individual

- DBU's Talentpris 2011: Danish under-17 player of the year
- Spillerforeningen 2013: Danish talent of the year
- Danish Talent of the Year: 2014
- UEFA European Championship Team of the Tournament: 2020
- Danish Football Player of the Year: 2022

== See also ==
- List of men's footballers with 100 or more international caps
