= Tadjidine Mmadi =

French footballer (born 2007)

Personal information
- Date of birth: 3 March 2007 (age 19)
- Place of birth: Marseille, France
- Height: 1.80 m (5 ft 11 in)
- Position: Attacking midfielder

Team information
- Current team: Marseille
- Number: 43

Youth career
- 2014–2015: AS Flamants-Iris
- 2015–2019: FCL Malpassé
- 2019–2025: Marseille

Senior career*
Years	Team	Apps	(Gls)
2025–	Marseille B	17	(4)
2025–	Marseille	5	(0)

International career^{‡}
2025–	France U19	4	(0)
2025–	France U20	6	(0)
- * Club domestic league appearances and goals as of 21:44, 11 September 2026 (UTC) ‡ National team caps and goals as of 21:27, 18 November 2025 (UTC)

Tadjidine Mmadi (born 7 March 2007) is a French professional footballer who plays as an attacking midfielder for Ligue 1 club Marseille.

== Club career ==
Mmadi is a product of the youth academies of the French clubs AS Flamants-Iris, FCL Malpassé, and Marseille. On 20 March 2025, he signed his first professional contract with Marseille until 2028 and was promoted to their reserves. He debuted with Marseille as a substitute in a 1–0 UEFA Champions League loss to Atalanta on 5 November 2025.

== International career ==
Born in France, Mmadi is of Comorian descent. He was called up to the France U20s for the 2025 FIFA U-20 World Cup.

== Career statistics ==
As of match played 17 September 2026

Appearances and goals by club, season and competition
Club	Season	League			Coupe de France		Europe		Other		Total	
Club	Season	Division	Apps	Goals	Apps	Goals	Apps	Goals	Apps	Goals	Apps	Goals
Marseille B	2024–25	CFA 2	3	1	—		—		—		3	1
Marseille B	2025–26	CFA 2	14	3	—		—		—		14	3
Marseille B	Total		17	4	—		—		—		17	4
Marseille	2025–26	Ligue 1	3	0	2	1	1 (Note: Appearances in UEFA Champions League)	0	0	0	6	1
Marseille	2026–27	Ligue 1	2	0	0	0	1 (Note: Appearances in UEFA Europa League)	0	0	0	3	0
Marseille	Total		5	0	2	1	2	0	0	0	9	1
Career total			22	4	2	1	2	0	0	0	26	5
