= Nouhoum Kamissoko =

Ivorian footballer (born 2004)

Personal information
- Date of birth: 27 December 2004 (age 21)
- Place of birth: Bamako, Mali
- Height: 1.83 m (6 ft 0 in)
- Position: Midfielder

Team information
- Current team: Marseille
- Number: 71

Youth career
- 2018–2023: Étoiles Mandé

Senior career*
Years	Team	Apps	(Gls)
2023–	Marseille II	38	(0)
2024	→Châteauroux II (loan)	4	(0)
2024–2025	→Châteauroux (loan)	6	(0)
2026–	Marseille	7	(1)
- * Club domestic league appearances and goals

Nouhoum Kamissoko (born 27 December 2004) is a Malian professional footballer who plays as a midfielder for Ligue 1 club Marseille.

== Club career ==
Kamissoko is a product of the youth academy of the Malian club Étoiles Mandé. On 22 July 2023, he joined Marseille where he was assigned to their reserves. On 5 December 2024, he joined Châteauroux on a year-long loan in the Championnat National. He returned to Marseille for the 2025–26 season, and on 19 February 2026 extended his contract until 2027. He made his senior and professional debut with Marseille as a substitute in a 1–1 tie with Nice on 26 April 2026.

== Career statistics ==
As of match played 22 October 2026

Appearances and goals by club, season and competition
Club	Season	League			Cup		Europe		Other		Total	
Club	Season	Division	Apps	Goals	Apps	Goals	Apps	Goals	Apps	Goals	Apps	Goals
Marseille B	2023–24	CFA 2	16	0	—		—		—		16	0
Marseille B	2024–25	CFA 2	4	0	—		—		—		4	0
Marseille B	2026–27	CFA 2	1	0	—		—		—		1	0
Marseille B	Total		21	0	—		—		—		21	0
Châteauroux II	2024–25	CFA 2	4	0	—		—		—		4	0
Châteauroux	2024–25	Ligue 3	6	0	—		—		—		6	0
Marseille	2025–26	Ligue 1	3	0	—		—		—		3	0
Marseille	2026–27	Ligue 1	2	1	0	0	1 (Note: Appearances in UEFA Europa League)	0	—		3	1
Marseille	Total		5	1	0	0	1	0	0	0	6	1
Career total			36	1	0	0	1	0	0	0	37	1
