= Keyliane Abdallah =

French footballer (born 2006)

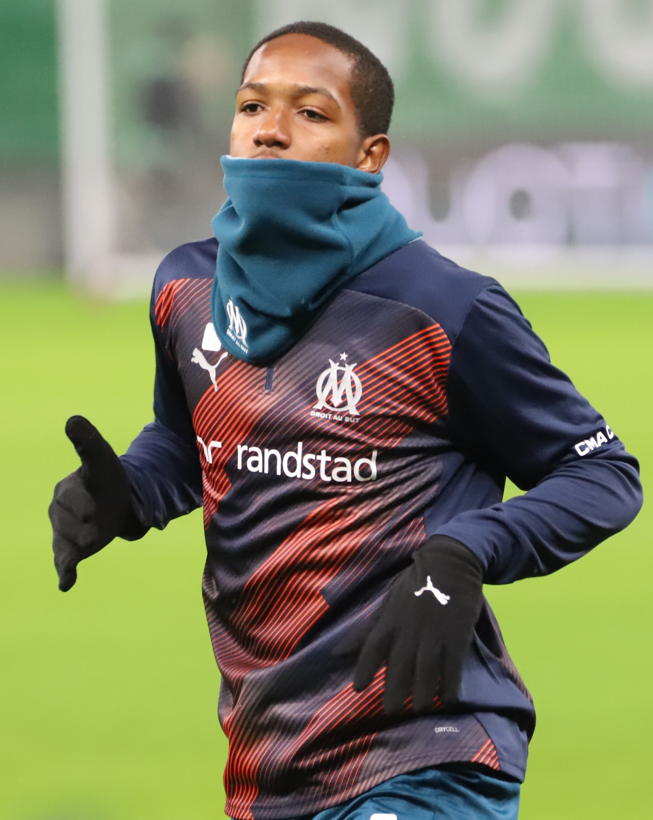
- Abdallah with Marseille in 2024

Personal information
- Full name: Keyliane Hikram Abdallah
- Date of birth: 5 April 2006 (age 20)
- Place of birth: Kani-Kéli, Mayotte, France
- Height: 1.85 m (6 ft 1 in)
- Position: Striker

Team information
- Current team: Marseille
- Number: 48

Youth career
- –2013: AJ Kani-Kéli
- 2013–2021: La Tamponnaise
- 2021–: Marseille

Senior career*
Years	Team	Apps	(Gls)
2023–	Marseille B	26	(5)
2023–	Marseille	12	(2)
2026	→ Gimnàstic (loan)	13	(2)

International career^{‡}
2025–	France U20	1	(0)
- * Club domestic league appearances and goals as of 22 November 2026 ‡ National team caps and goals as of 4 September 2025

Keyliane Hikram Abdallah (born 5 April 2006) is a French footballer who plays as a striker for Ligue 1 club Marseille.

== Early life ==
Abdallah grew up in a village in the south of Mayotte. He started playing football at the age of four.

== Career ==
As a youth player, Abdallah joined the youth academy of Mayotte side AJ Kani-Kéli. In 2013, he joined the youth academy of Reunion side La Tamponnaise. In 2021, he joined the youth academy of French Ligue 1 side Olympique de Marseille. He helped the club win the league. He was regarded as one of their most important players.

== Style of play ==
Abdallah mainly operates as a striker. He has been described as having "innate talent and unfailing determination".

== Personal life ==
Born in France, Abdallah is of Comorian descent. He is the nephew of fellow footballer Toifilou Maoulida. He has four siblings.

== Career statistics ==
As of match played 22 October 2026

Appearances and goals by club, season and competition
Club	Season	League			Cup		Europe		Total	
Club	Season	Division	Apps	Goals	Apps	Goals	Apps	Goals	Apps	Goals
Marseille B	2023–24	CFA 2	2	0	—		—		2	0
Marseille B	2024–25	CFA 2	12	3	—		—		12	3
Marseille B	2025–26	CFA 2	12	2	—		—		12	2
Marseille B	Total		26	5	—		—		26	5
Marseille	2023–24	Ligue 1	1	0	0	0	0	0	1	0
Marseille	2024–25	Ligue 1	1	0	0	0	—		1	0
Marseille	2026–27	Ligue 1	6	1	0	0	3 (Note: Appearances in UEFA Europa League)	1	9	2
Marseille	Total		8	1	0	0	3	1	11	2
Gimnàstic (loan)	2025–26	Primera Federación	13	2	—		—		13	2
Career total			47	8	0	0	3	1	50	9
