= Jack Kachkar =

Person convicted of financial fraud

Jack Kachkar (born February 19, 1963) is an entrepreneur and businessman.

== Early life ==
Kachkar was born in Damascus, Syria, to Armenian parents (Mihran Missak Kachkar; née Kachkarian). His parents were Armenians from Syria.

Kachkar immigrated from Lebanon to Canada in September 1969. He attended school and went to University of Alberta in Edmonton prior to transferring to Hungary, where he attained a medical degree, summa cum laude.

== Business career ==
In 2005, the High Court in Ireland restricted Kachkar under the Companies Act: Mitek Holdings Ltd v Companies Act [2005] IEHC 63. The order was upheld following an appeal to the Irish Supreme Court.

Kachkar tried to purchase Olympique de Marseille football club in early 2007. Marseilles' boss broke off talks in March 2007 after the Canadian businessman asked for further due diligence required by his bankers to pay the €115,000,000 price for him to take over the former European champions.

=== Court case ===
From 2005 to 2007, Kachkar's pharmaceutical company, Inyx, allegedly faked paperwork that convinced Westernbank, a bank in Puerto Rico, to loan him $142 million. Kachkar was convicted on Feb. 4, 2019, after a three-week trial, of eight counts of wire fraud affecting a financial institution. Jack Kachkar, 56, was sentenced by U.S. District Judge Donald L. Graham of the Southern District of Florida, who also presided over the trial in this case. Judge Graham also ordered the defendant to pay $103,490,005 in restitution to the FDIC, as receiver for Westernbank. A federal court found Kachkar guilty of eight counts of wire fraud affecting a financial institution. Kachkar, a Key Biscayne, Florida resident and the former CEO and chairman of a now-bankrupt multinational pharmaceutical company, was sentenced to 30 years in prison followed by five years of supervised release yesterday for his role his role in a $100 million scheme to defraud Westernbank of Puerto Rico. The losses triggered a series of events leading to Westernbank's insolvency and ultimate collapse.

According to evidence presented at trial, from 2005 to 2007, Kachkar was chairman and CEO of Inyx Inc., a publicly traded multinational pharmaceutical manufacturing company. Beginning in early 2005, Kachkar caused Westernbank to enter into a series of loan agreements in exchange for a security interest in the assets of Inyx and its subsidiaries. Under the loan agreements, Westernbank agreed to advance money based on Inyx’s customer invoices from “actual and bona fide” sales to Inyx customers, the evidence showed.

The trial evidence showed that Kachkar orchestrated a scheme to defraud Westernbank by causing numerous Inyx employees to make tens of millions of dollars' worth of fake customer invoices purportedly payable by customers in the United Kingdom, Sweden and elsewhere. Kachkar caused these invoices to be presented to Westernbank as valid invoices. Kachkar made false and fraudulent representations to Westernbank executives about purported and imminent repayments from lenders in the United Kingdom, Norway, Libya and elsewhere in order to lull Westernbank into continuing to lend money to Inyx, the evidence showed. In fact, these lenders had not agreed to repay Westernbank’s loan. Kachkar made false and fraudulent representations to Westernbank executives that he had additional collateral, including purported mines in Mexico and Canada worth hundreds of millions of dollars, to induce Westernbank to lend additional funds, the evidence showed. In fact, this additional collateral was worth barely a fraction of that represented by Kachkar. During the course of the scheme, Kachkar caused Westernbank to lend approximately $142 million, primarily based on false and fraudulent customer invoices. The evidence showed that the defendant diverted tens of millions of dollars for his own personal benefit, including for the purchase of, among other things, a private jet, luxury homes in Key Biscayne and Brickell, Miami, luxury cars, luxury hotel stays, and extravagant jewelry and clothing expenditures.
