= Jelle Van Neck =

Belgian footballer

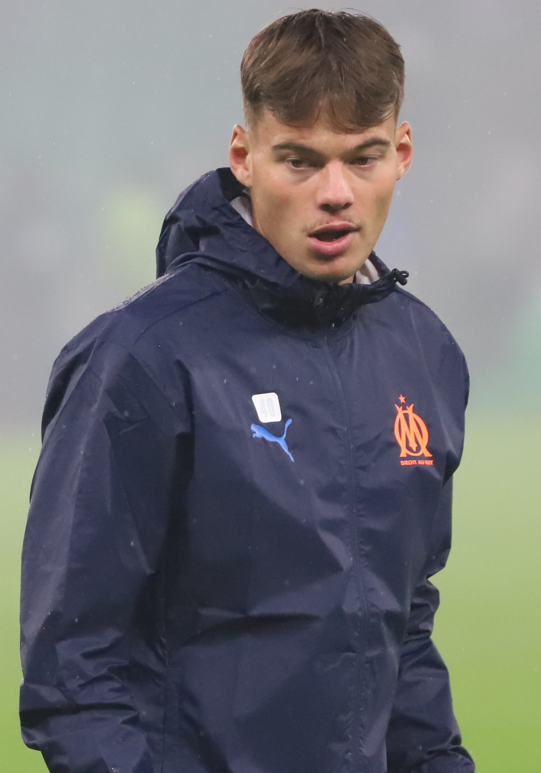
- Van Neck warming up with Marseille in 2024

Personal information
- Date of birth: 7 March 2004 (age 22)
- Place of birth: Bruges, Belgium
- Height: 1.91 m (6 ft 3 in)
- Position: Goalkeeper

Team information
- Current team: Marseille
- Number: 40

Youth career
- 2012–2022: Club Brugge

Senior career*
Years	Team	Apps	(Gls)
2022–	Marseille II	16	(0)

International career
2019	Belgium U19	2	(0)
- * Club domestic league appearances and goals as of 00:15, 12 August 2024 (UTC)

Jelle Van Neck (born 7 March 2004) is a Belgian professional footballer who plays for Marseille as a goalkeeper.

== Career ==
Van Neck grew up in Blankenberge, West Flanders.

After a decade playing for Club Brugge youth teams, he signed for Marseille on a five-year contract in June 2022.

Van Neck scored for Marseille in the 2022–23 UEFA Youth League with a last minute header to draw a game against Eintracht Frankfurt.
