= Olympique de Marseille =

French football club

- Full name: Olympique de Marseille
- Nicknames: Les Phocéens (The Phocaeans); Les Olympiens (The Olympians)
- Short name: OM, Marseille
- Founded: 31 August 1899; 127 years ago
- Stadium: Stade Vélodrome
- Capacity: 67,394
- Owners: Frank McCourt (95%); Margarita Louis-Dreyfus (5%)
- President: Stéphane Richard
- Head coach: Bruno Génésio
- League: Ligue 1
- 2025–26: Ligue 1, 5th of 18
- Website: OM.fr
Home colours	Away colours	Third colours

Olympique de Marseille (French: [ɔlɛ̃pik də maʁsɛj], locally [olɛ̃ˈpikə də maχˈsɛjə]; Occitan: Olimpic de Marselha, pronounced [ulimˈpi de maʀˈsejɔ]), also known simply as Marseille, or by the abbreviation OM ([oɛm], locally [oˈɛmə]), is a French professional football club based in Marseille which competes in Ligue 1, the top flight of French football. Marseille play their home matches at the Stade Vélodrome. OM is one of the most popular football clubs in the country, having regularly averaged the highest attendance in French football. They have a long-standing rivalry with Paris Saint-Germain, against whom they contest Le Classique.

Behind PSG, Marseille is the second most decorated French football team with a total of 29 trophies, including 28 major titles. They have won 26 domestic trophies: nine league titles, one Ligue 2 title, ten Coupe de France, one Coupe Charles Drago, three Coupe de la Ligue, and three Trophée des Champions. Internationally, OM won the UEFA Champions League in 1993, becoming the first French side to claim the trophy and one of just two French clubs to secure a major European title. The UEFA Intertoto Cup in 2005 marked the club's second continental triumph. They were also runners-up at the European Cup (currently the Champions League) in 1991 and at the UEFA Europa League (formerly the UEFA Cup) in 1999, 2004 and 2018.

American businessman Frank McCourt bought 95% of the club's stake in 2016 and Marseille was listed in the Deloitte Football Money League at the end of the 2023–2024 season, making it the football club with the 19th highest revenue in the world, approximated at €287 million. In 2025, Marseille was 26th in the global ranking by British consultancy organisation Brand Finance in terms of brand value, and 21st in terms of brand strength with a rating AA ("very strong").

== History ==
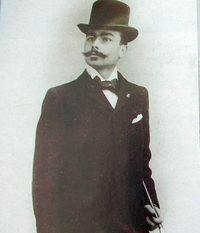
OM founder, René Dufaure de Montmirail.

Olympique de Marseille was founded as an omnisport club in 1892 by René Dufaure de Montmirail, a French sports official. Known as Football Club de Marseille in the first seven years after its foundation, the club adopted the name Olympique de Marseille in 1899, with the name Olympique coming from ancient Olympic Games in honour of the Greeks from Phocaea, founders of Marseille's some 25 centuries earlier.

At first, rugby union was the most important team sport of the club, the motto Droit au but coming from rugby. Affiliated with the Union des Sociétés Françaises de Sports Athlétiques (USFSA) since 1898, it was only in 1902, thanks to English and German people (according to André Gascard), that football began to be played by Olympique de Marseille. Richer and better organised than other football teams of Marseille (Sporting, Stade, Phocéenne), Olympique de Marseille, then playing at the Stade de l'Huveaune, took the leadership in the city. In 1904, Olympique de Marseille won the first Championnat du Littoral, involving opposing teams from Marseille and its suburbs, and took part in the final rounds of the 11th French championship. At that time, the word "football" applied to rugby, and people used the word "Association" (which would be soccer in North America) for football.

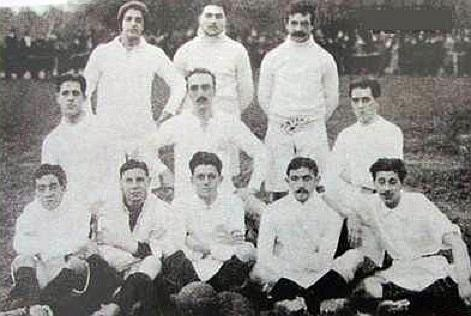
The team of 1911.

During the 1920s, Olympique de Marseille became an important team in France, winning the Coupe de France in 1924, 1926 and 1927. The team won the French championship in 1929, defeating Club français. The Coupe de France in 1924 was the club's first major title, won against FC Sète, a side that dominated French football at the time. In the '20s, numerous French internationals, such as Jules Dewaquez, Jean Boyer or Joseph Alcazar, played for Marseille. In 1930, Marseille lost against Sète, which would be the winner, in the semi-final round. In 1931, the team became champion of the South-East, with victories against rivals such as Sète. In the Coupe de France, OM lost in five matches to Club français, winning the second match that was cancelled due to the disqualification of Marseille striker Vernicke. Even though the 1931–32 season was less successful, Marseille easily entered the professional ranks, becoming a member of the union of professional clubs in 1932. On 13 January 1932 at 9:15 pm, at the Brasserie des Sports, Mr. Dard, Mr. Bison, Dr. Rollenstein, Mr. Etchepare, Mr. Leblanc, Mr. Mille, Mr. Anfosso, Mr. Sabatier, Mr. Seze, Mr. Bazat, Mr. Molteroj and Mr. Pollack elected the following committee: Honorary presidents: Paul Le Cesne, Fernand Bouisson; President: Mr. Dard; Vice-Presidents: Mr. Leblanc, Mr. Bison, Mr. Etchepare, Dr. Rollenstein, Mr. Anfosso; General secretary: Mr. Possel-Daydier; Treasurer: Mr. Bison (assisted by Mr. Ribel).

For the first championship, Division 1 was divided into two pools. Marseille finished second in the first, behind Lille. For its first match of the championship, Marseille defeated the future champion, Lille. In 1937, Marseille won its first professional French championship thanks to goal difference (+30 for Marseille, +17 for Sochaux). The arrival of Vasconcellos made the defence stronger, whereas former goalkeeper Laurent Di Lorto shone with Sochaux and France. In the meantime, Marseille won the Coupe de France in 1935 and 1938 but failed a double success in 1934, due to FC Sète. In 1938, Larbi Benbarek signed with Marseille and became "the black pearl" for the team. World War II would cut his career short. The 1942–43 season was full of records: 100 goals in 30 matches, including 20 in one match (20–2 against Avignon), in which Aznar scored nine goals, including the first eight (Marseille was leading 8–0), playing only 70 minutes. Aznar scored 45 goals in 30 matches, plus 11 in cup games, for a record of 56 goals in 38 matches. With the minots (young players) of the moment (Scotti, Robin, Dard, Pironti), Marseille won the cup in two matches against Bordeaux (4–0). In 1948, thanks to a draw against Sochaux, Marseille became the champions of France. The two last victories at the Stade Vélodrome against Roubaix (6–0) and Metz (6–3) were important, as Aznar and Robin's returned in spring.

In 1952, Marseille were about to be relegated, but Gunnar Andersson saved his team, finishing as top scorer with 31 goals. The team won (5–3) on aggregate against Valenciennes. The same year, Marseille lost at the Stade Vélodrome against Saint-Étienne 10–3, but Liberati was injured. In 1953, Gunnar Andersson would take the record of goals scored in one season with 35. Andersson also became the all-time top scorer of Olympique de Marseille during his time there with 194 goals. A record he still holds (2023). Marseille was runner-up in the Coupe de France (Nice won 2–1) in 1954 and won the Coupe Charles Drago in 1957. Marseille were struggling at the time and were relegated for the first time in 1959. From 1959 to 1965, the team played in the second division, except during the 1962–63 season, finishing 20th out of 20 in the first division. In 1965, Marcel Leclerc became president.

=== 1965–1986: Leclerc era and crisis ===
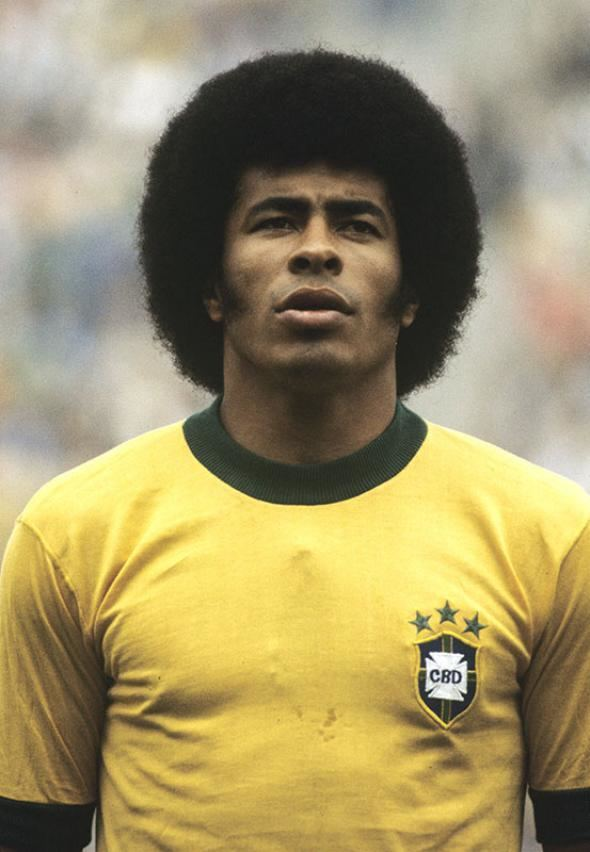
Brazilian 1970 World Cup winner Jairzinho joined OM in 1974.

The first period of Olympique de Marseille's domination of the French League started in the early 1970s under Marcel Leclerc's presidency (1965–1972). His ambition allowed Marseille to return to the First division in 1965–66. They went on to win the Coupe de France in 1969 as well as the First division in 1971 with a record of 44 goals by Josip Skoblar, helped by Roger Magnusson. The arrival of Georges Carnus and Bernard Bosquier from Saint-Étienne helped them to win the Ligue 1 and the Coupe de France in 1972. Marseille played in the European Cup in 1971–72 and 1972–73, but were knocked-out by Ajax of Johan Cruyff and Juventus, respectively. However, success was not to last. Marcel Leclerc was forced to leave the club on 19 July 1972. Notorious to be a stubborn man, Leclerc threatened the league to withdraw his professional team from Ligue 1 in response to the federation refusing to register three foreign players per team (Leclerc wanted to acquire the Hungarian star Zoltán Varga, but had already the maximum number of two foreigners in his team). Marseille decided, instead of following Leclerc against the league, to fire him. Then followed an era of crisis, with Marseille only winning a Coupe de France in 1976 and being relegated to the second division. Struggling financially, the club relied mainly on young local players: the Minots who allowed the team to return to First division in 1984. Éric Di Meco, future French international, was one of them.

=== 1986–1996: Tapie era, Champions League win, bribery scandal, and decline ===
Thanks to Marseille mayor Gaston Defferre, Bernard Tapie became the new club president on 12 April 1986, and promptly proceeded to assemble the greatest football team seen in France up to that point. His first signings were Karlheinz Förster and Alain Giresse, who were bought after the 1986 FIFA World Cup. Over the subsequent six years, in his pursuit of the European Cup, Tapie signed a number of highly regarded players such as Jean-Pierre Papin, Chris Waddle, Enzo Francescoli, Abedi Pele, Klaus Allofs, Eric Cantona, Carlos Mozer, Jean Tigana, Didier Deschamps, Dragan Stojković, Basile Boli, Marcel Desailly, Rudi Völler, Fabien Barthez, Alen Bokšić, Martín Vázquez, and François Omam-Biyik in addition to appointing high-profile coaches like Franz Beckenbauer, Gérard Gili and Raymond Goethals. Between 1989 and 1992, Olympique de Marseille won four league titles in a row and the French Cup. The team also reached the European Cup final for the first time in 1991, losing on penalties to Red Star Belgrade. The highlight of the club's history is winning the new format Champions League in 1993. Basile Boli scored the only goal against Italy's Milan in the final held in Munich's Olympic Stadium. That triumph was the first time ever for a French club and it made Didier Deschamps and Fabien Barthez the youngest captain and goalkeeper, respectively, to capture the title.

This triumph, however, was followed by a decade of decline. In 1994, due to financial irregularities and a match-fixing scandal involving then-president Bernard Tapie, they suffered enforced relegation to the second division, where Marseille stayed for two years before returning to the First division. Moreover, they lost their 1992–93 Division 1 title and the right to play in the 1993–94 UEFA Champions League, the 1993 European Super Cup and the 1993 Intercontinental Cup. This scandal, called l'affaire VA-OM (VA for Union Sportive Valenciennes-Anzin and OM for Olympique de Marseille), was exposed by Valenciennes, whose players Jacques Glassmann, Jorge Burruchaga and Christophe Robert were contacted by Marseille player Jean-Jacques Eydelie to let OM win and, more importantly, not to injure any OM player ahead of the UEFA Champions League final.

=== 1996–2009: Return to success ===
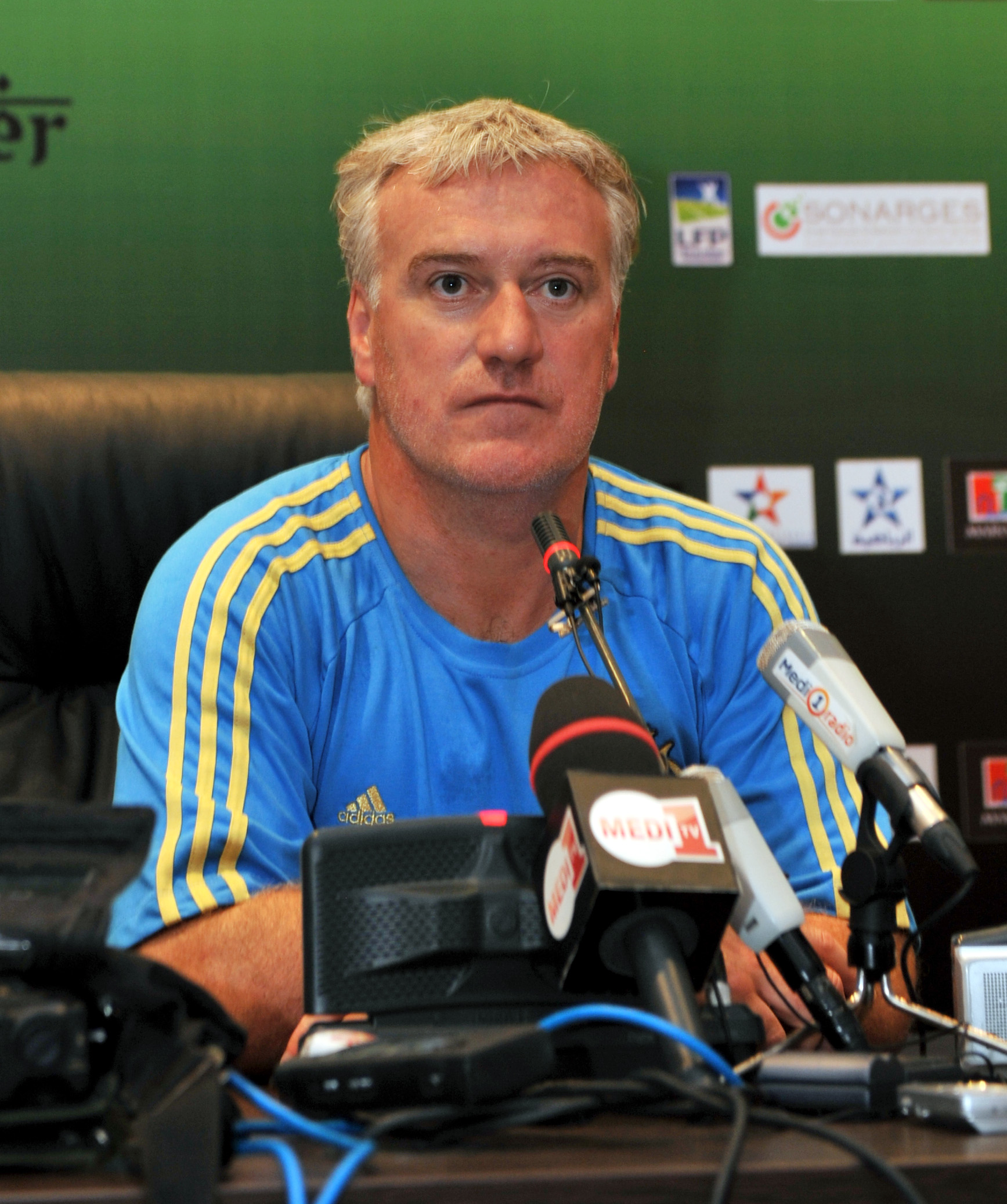
OM won six titles with Didier Deschamps as manager between 2009 and 2012.

Marseille returned to the top flight in 1996 with backing from Adidas's CEO Robert Louis-Dreyfus. He chose Rolland Courbis as coach, signed Fabrizio Ravanelli, Laurent Blanc and Andreas Köpke, and Marseille finished eleventh for his return. For the 1998–99 season, the team celebrated their centenary and built a team of stars: Robert Pires, Florian Maurice and Christophe Dugarry, culminating in a second-place finish in the French championship, behind Bordeaux and an appearance in the UEFA Cup Final in 1999, losing to Parma. Courbis left the team in November 1999 after a poor start to the season.

The closest Marseille got to another trophy was when they reached the UEFA Cup Final in 2004, impressively beating Dnipro, Internazionale, Liverpool and Newcastle United along the way. But they were beaten in the final by newly crowned Spanish champions Valencia and once again fans were forced to continue waiting for the next trophy to come along. In 2005, Marseille succeeded in winning the Intertoto Cup, beating the likes of Lazio and Deportivo de La Coruña in doing so, and earning another shot at the UEFA Cup.

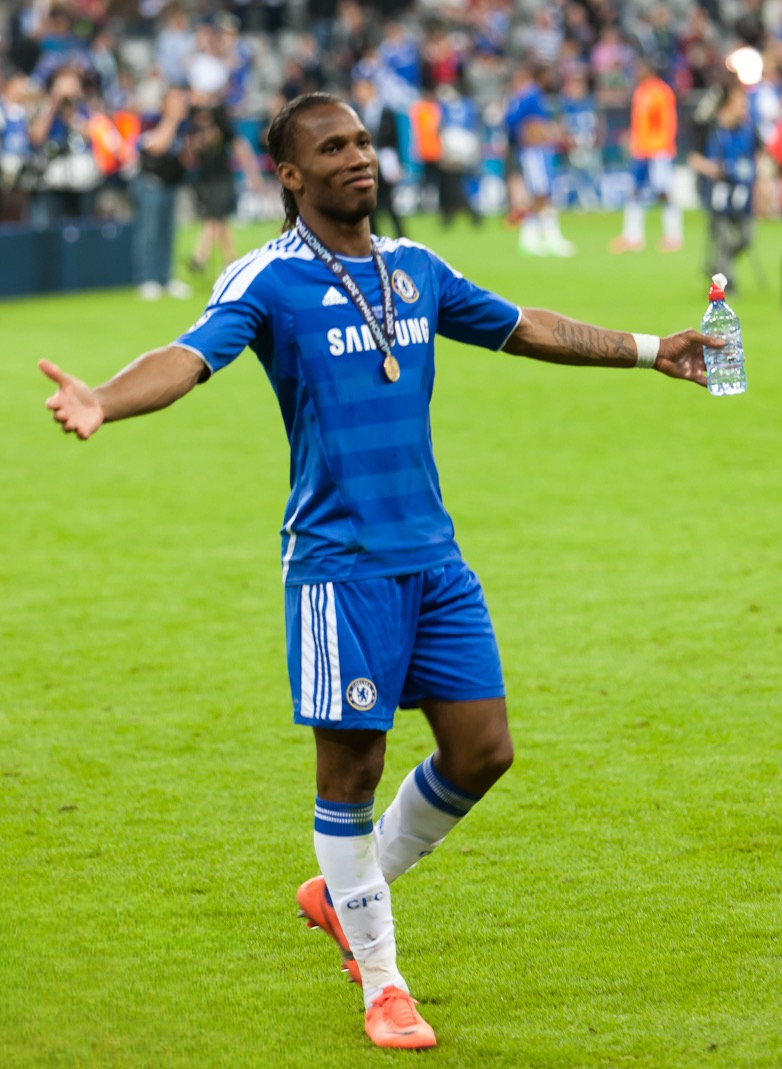
Didier Drogba played greatly for OM during the 2003–2004 season, scoring 32 goals and gaining attention from then Chelsea coach José Mourinho.

In January 2007, there was negotiation between Louis-Dreyfus and Jack Kachkar, a Canadian doctor and businessman (CEO of pharmaceutical company Inyx), about selling the club. As Jack Kachkar took too much time to buy the team, Louis-Dreyfus decided on 22 March 2007 not to sell to the Canadian businessman. Another close call to glory was in the Coupe de France final against Sochaux in May 2007. However, they lost on penalties after a 2–2 draw after extra time, to the disappointment of everyone linked with the club, but they soon wiped all that disappointment away by qualifying for the 2007–08 UEFA Champions League group stage after securing second place with one game to spare.

In the Champions League, Marseille became the first French team to win at Anfield when they beat 2007 runners-up Liverpool 1–0, and the team took six out of six points from their opening two games. They only drew one more match, and in a winner-takes-all final group game they lost 4–0 to Liverpool, who became the first English team to win at the Stade Vélodrome. Marseille, coming third in the Champions League Group A, then joined the UEFA Cup. Marseille finished the 2008–09 season with a second-place finish in Ligue 1, following a tight race with Bordeaux for the title. This earned them direct entry into the group stages of the UEFA Champions League, their third consecutive season in the competition. Marseille won the 2010 Coupe de la Ligue Final beating Bordeaux 3–1 at the Stade de France in March 2010. This was their first major title since their Champions League triumph 17 years earlier. Two months later, Marseille won their first league championship for 18 years with two games to spare after beating Rennes 3–1. Marseille defeated rivals Paris Saint-Germain (PSG) on penalties to win the 2010 Trophée des Champions at Stade 7 Novembre in Rades, Tunisia, before the season began. Marseille then became the first team to win back-to-back Coupe de la Ligue successes when they won the 2011 edition by beating Montpellier 1–0 on 23 April. Before that, they qualified for the last 16 of the UEFA Champions League for the first time since their historic success, but lost 2–1 at Old Trafford to Manchester United and also set a Champions League record by thrashing Žilina 7–0 in what was the biggest away win in the competition's history. In 2011, Marseille lost the Ligue 1 championship title but qualified for the UEFA Champions League for the fifth time in a row, a club record. On 27 July 2011, Marseille won the 2011 Trophée des Champions title by beating Lille 5–4 at Stade de Tanger in Morocco. The result was significant as OM were 3–1 down with five minutes to go, only to embark on a remarkable comeback which saw 5 goals scored in the last five minutes with André Ayew scoring a hat-trick.

=== 2009–2014: Deschamps, Baup, Anigo ===
The club struggled in the 2011–12 season, going to the bottom of the Ligue 1 table after six matches. Nevertheless, Marseille rebounded, winning 3–0 against Borussia Dortmund in the Champions League, as well as a 3–0 success over rivals PSG in November of that year. Marseille ended 2011 with a good sequence, also qualifying for the knockout stages of the Champions League for the second season running.

In February 2012, Marseille embarked on 13 games without victory, but rallied to qualify for the quarter-finals of the Champions League for the first time since winning the competition in 1993. Despite an indifferent club form, OM lost to eventual finalists Bayern Munich, and slumped to an overall tenth-place finish in Ligue 1. However, the club retained the Coupe de la Ligue for the third year running, beating Lyon 1–0 in the Final.

In the summer of 2012, Deschamps resigned, and later took on the France job. Elie Baup took over, leading the club to a surprising second-place finish in the 2012–13 season despite selling multiple key players, including Loïc Rémy, César Azpilicueta and Stéphane Mbia. Marseille returned to the Champions League, spending close to €40 million on the likes of Dimitri Payet, Florian Thauvin and Giannelli Imbula. The club were top of the table at the end of August 2013, but OM proceeded to lose all six games in Europe, suffering the ignominy of becoming the first French team, and the biggest European team to date, to have picked up zero points in a Champions League group stage.

Baup was sacked on 7 December 2013, following the 1–0 defeat to Nantes at Stade Velodrome. He was replaced on an interim basis by José Anigo. In Anigo's brief tenure, OM went out of the two cups, and struggled, leading to continued protests and jeers by fans. The club finished sixth in the 2014 season, missing out on an important European competition place for the first time in ten years. Anigo left the club soon after, taking on an ambassadorial/scouting role in North Africa, his first post outside of the city for more than four decades.

=== 2014–2015: Bielsa era and stagnation ===
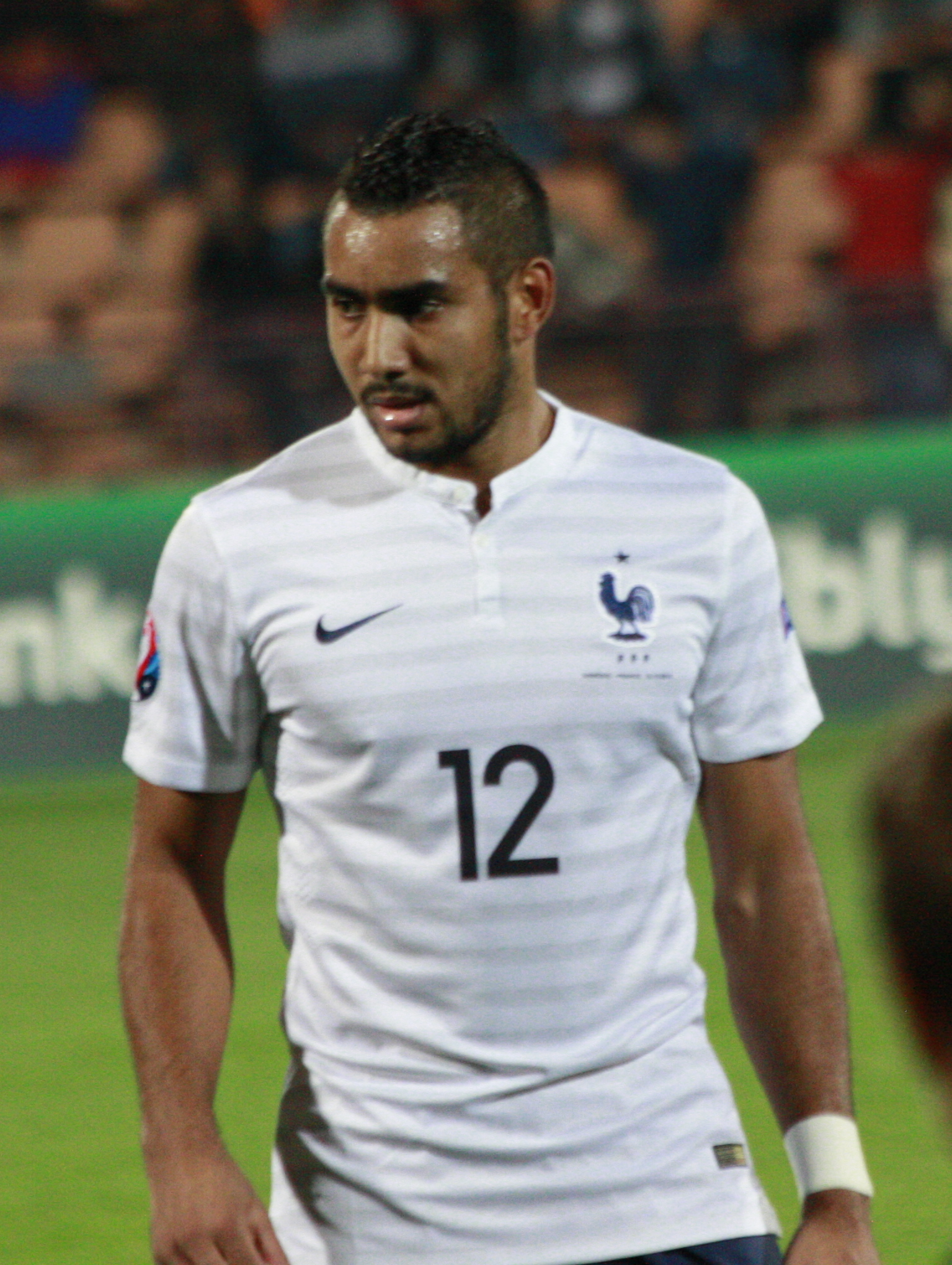
Dimitri Payet is the leader of the OM Champions project of Frank McCourt.

Marseille announced on 2 May 2014 an agreement with Marcelo Bielsa, who took the managerial hotseat. Bielsa was the club's first Argentine coach and the first coach to lead the team into the renovated Velodrome, which opened in August with a fixture against Montpellier. In Bielsa's first season in charge, the club led the league table for seven months but finished fourth and thus qualified for the UEFA Europa League. June 2015 saw three key players leave the club—André-Pierre Gignac and André Ayew left the club for Tigres and Swansea City, respectively, after their contracts expired, while Dimitri Payet left to join West Ham United for a €15 million transfer fee.

After a solid pre-season, which included a 2–0 win over Juventus in the Robert Louis-Dreyfus Trophy and the signature of nine players, Bielsa resigned from his post, just minutes after the first Ligue 1 game of the 2015–16 season against Caen. Marseille lost the game 1–0, and Bielsa shocked the footballing world with his unexpected decision, citing a lack of trust with the club's management, who he said had reneged on a previously agreed contract extension. Bielsa's departure reportedly left his players in a state of shock, many of whom learnt the news via social media in the dressing room.

On 19 August 2015, Míchel was announced as Marseille's new coach. He endured a frustrating season, with OM failing to win a home game in Ligue 1 for more than six months. Following a number of poor performances, Míchel was sacked in April by club owner Margarita Louis Dreyfus, citing poor conduct as the team's coach. The sacking came on the eve of the club's Coupe de France semi-final fixture. As in 2015, Passi was installed as the caretaker coach. Under his direction, Marseille reached the Coupe de France final for the first time in nine years, losing out 4–2 to rivals Paris Saint-Germain. OM would finish the league season in 13th, the club's worst league finish in 15 years.

In the summer of 2016, Marseille once more sold off a number of key players to meet financial obligations and to clear its wage bill ahead of an impending takeover. Steve Mandanda, the club's long-serving captain ended eight years at the club and moved to Crystal Palace, Nicolas N'Koulou moved to Lyon, while striker Michy Batshuayi was sold to Chelsea for a club record €40 million.

=== 2016–present: New ownership and revival ===
Marseille began the 2016–17 Ligue 1 season with interim manager Franck Passi at the helm. On 29 August 2016, it was announced that American businessman Frank McCourt had agreed to buy the club from Margarita Louis-Dreyfus. The purchase deal was completed for a reported price tag of €45 million on 17 October 2016. Within the next few days, McCourt appointed Jacques-Henri Eyraud as the club's president, Rudi Garcia as the manager of the club's first team and Andoni Zubizarreta as director of sport.

On 3 May 2018, Marseille reached the final of the 2017–18 UEFA Europa League after eliminating Red Bull Salzburg in the semi-finals 3–2 on aggregate, 14 years after its last final in a European competition in 2004 against Valencia. However, they lost the final to Atlético Madrid.

In the 2019–20 Ligue 1 season, Andre Villas-Boas became head coach. Marseille finished second after the season was ended early due to the coronavirus pandemic, thus qualifying for the 2020–21 UEFA Champions League for the first time since 2013–14.

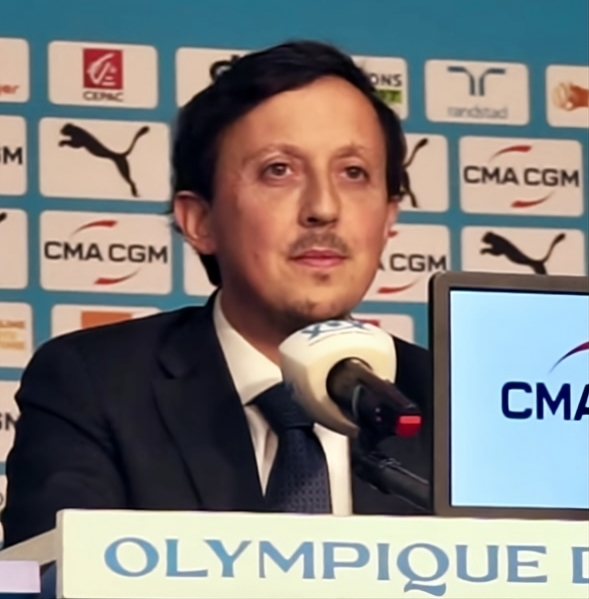
Former football scout Pablo Longoria went from sporting director to President in February 2021.

In February 2021, after this string of losses, conflict with players, and lack of support from sporting director Pablo Longoria and President Jacques-Henri Eyraud, head coach Andre Villas-Boas offered to resign, three days after a violent riot by protesting Marseille fans at the team training grounds had forced postponement of a league match with Rennes. Marseille sacked Villas-Boas, and replaced the coach with Argentine Jorge Sampaoli. The club also appointed Pablo Longoria to be the team's new president, replacing Jacques-Henri Eyraud, as Eyraud had also been a target of the ire of Marseille fans.

In January 2022, Marseille player Pape Gueye was banned from playing for 4 months by FIFA, while Marseille were given a ban on making transfers in both the summer 2022 and January 2023 transfer windows, and forced to pay €2.5 million to Watford. This came after the English club brought litigation against Marseille over the transfer of Gueye, who had originally signed a contract with Watford, but after finding out his agent had lied to him about the salary on offer, broke the contract and signed with Marseille. Marseille appealed FIFA's decision. In the 2021–22 Ligue 1 season, Marseille finished in second place, securing Champions League football for the first time since 2020. In the final matchday, they were helped by Lens's equalizing goal in the final moments of a 2–2 draw with Monaco.

== Rivalries ==
=== Le Classique ===
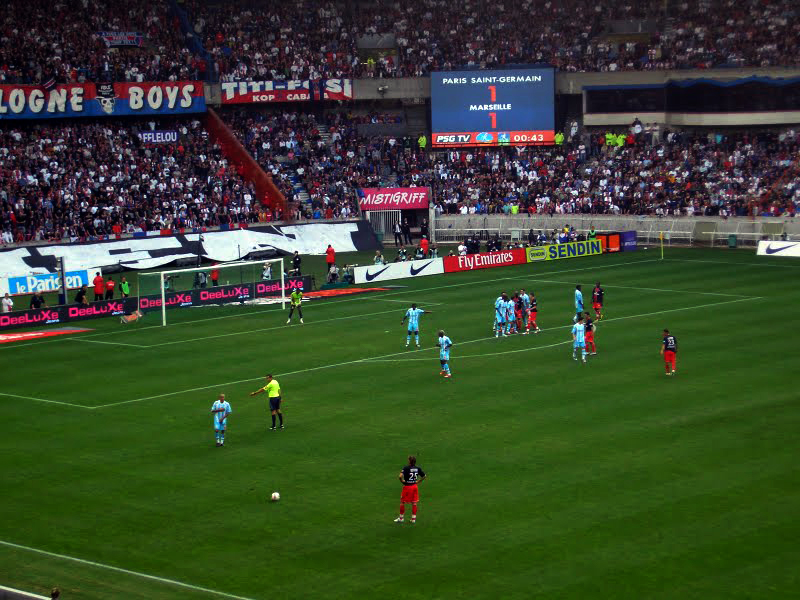
PSG-OM in 2007.

Le Classique is a football match that is contested between Olympique de Marseille and Paris Saint-Germain. The term Classique is modelled on El Clásico, contested between Barcelona and Real Madrid. Akin to all the game's major rivalries, the antipathy between PSG and Marseille extends outside the pitch. The French clásico has a historical, cultural and social importance that makes it more than just a football game, pitching capital against province, and the traditional wealth and high culture of Paris against the industrial and cosmopolitan traditions of Marseille. However, this rivalry appears only in the 1990s, where it is promoted by the respective owners of PSG - Canal+, the TV channel which broadcast the Ligue 1 football matches - and Olympique de Marseille - Bernard Tapie, also owner of the sports company Adidas -, for obvious marketing reasons. It is sometimes seen as 'the favourite son' of French football against its enfants terribles. With PSG being located in the north in the French capital and Marseille located along the Mediterranean coast, the rivalry is often referred to as "the North versus the South". PSG and Marseille are the only two French clubs to have won major European trophies, PSG having won the UEFA Cup Winners' Cup in 1996 as well as the UEFA Champions League in 2025, while Marseille won the UEFA Champions League in 1993. They were the two dominant forces before the emergence of Lyon at the beginning of the 21st century. However, despite their recent ups and downs, PSG and Marseille remain fierce rivals, giving this match a special atmosphere. "Le Classique" is also known as "Le Classico".

=== Choc des Olympiques ===
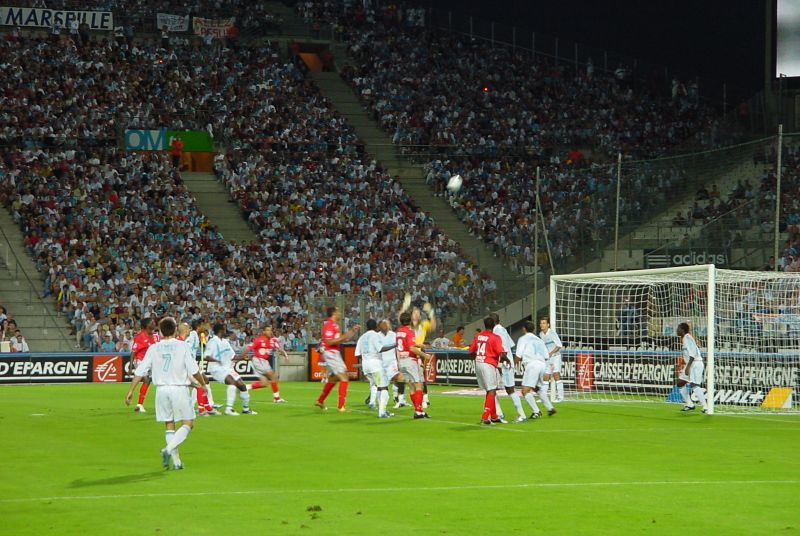
Choc des Olympiques match in 2005

The Choc des Olympiques (Clash of the Olympics), also known as the Derby des Olympiques (Derby of the Olympics), is the name of the football rivalry between two major teams in French football with "Olympique" in their names, Olympique Lyonnais and Olympique de Marseille. Canal+ has referred to the match as the "Olympico", in reference to El Clásico, a name that has gained in popularity among fans and the media. It specifically refers to individual matches between the teams. Unlike Le Classique, the rivalry has no bad blood within it and instead stems from the competitiveness of each club's players, managers, supporters, and presidential hierarchy. It is often cited as particularly important because both clubs are of high standard in French football and the championship is regularly decided between the two. Both clubs, along with Saint-Étienne and Paris Saint-Germain, are the only French clubs to have won the French first division four straight times, with Marseille doing it on two occasions. The rivalry is also comparable with that of between Borussia Mönchengladbach and Borussia Dortmund better known as "Borussen Derby" in Germany.

== Stadium ==
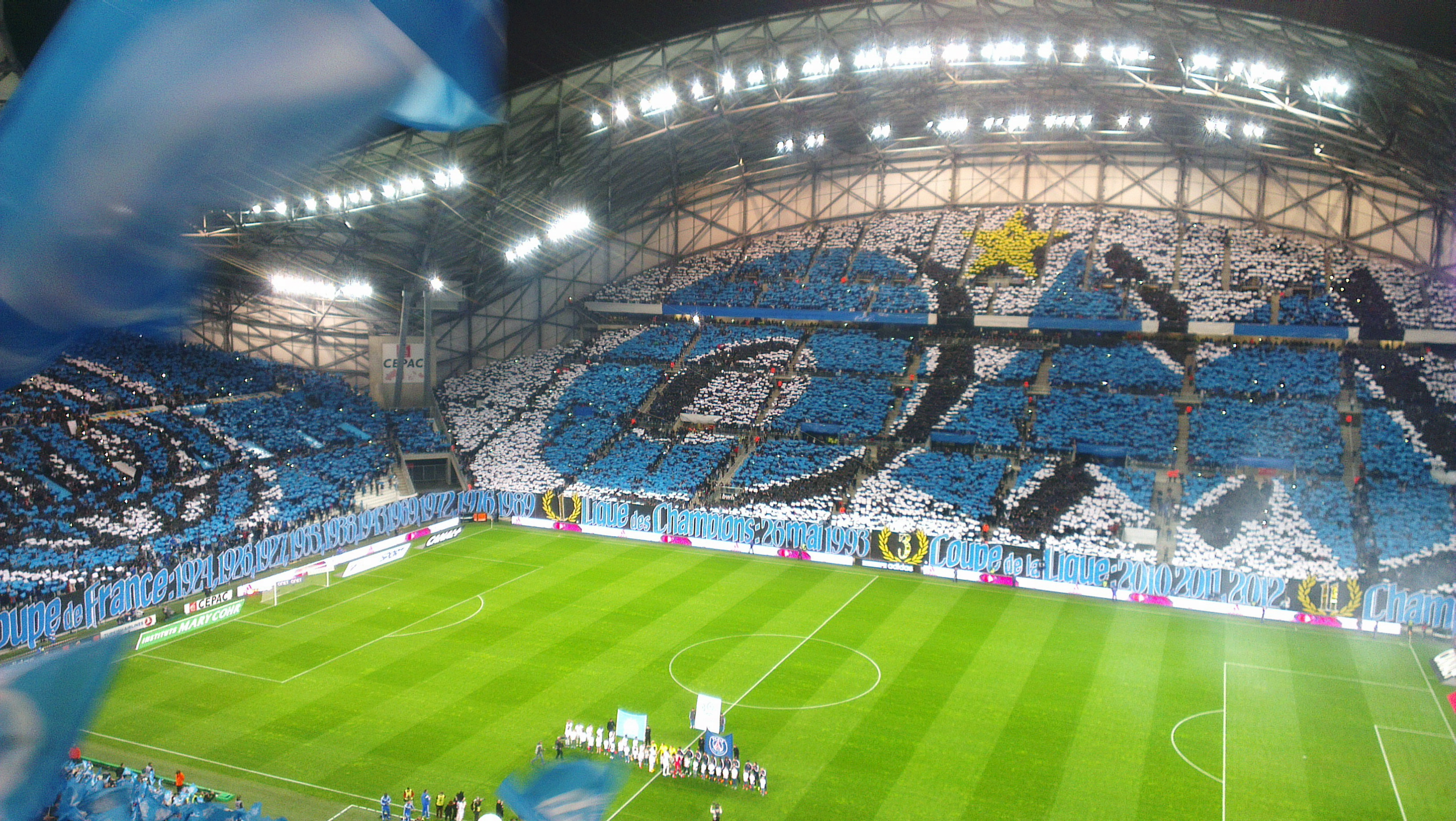
Stade Vélodrome in 2015 against PSG, the tifo was deployed during the players entrance.

From 1904 to 1937, Marseille played at the Stade de l'Huveaune, a stadium owned by the club, in contrast to its current stadium. L'Huveaune, once named Stade Fernand Buisson in honour of a former rugby player of the club who became a member of the French National Assembly, was renovated at the beginning of the twenties, thanks to supporter's financial help. It had a capacity of 15,000. In 1937, l'OM moved into the much larger Stade Vélodrome after compelling the city of Marseille to lower its rent. The club made use of the Stade de l'Huveaune again during the renovation of the Vélodrome for Euro 1984, during the 1982/83 season. The Vélodrome again underwent redevelopment in time for the 1998 World Cup and was transformed into an immense ground composed of two Curva ends (Virage Nord and Virage Sud – North Curve and South Curve) which house the supporters groups as well as the main stand, Jean Bouin, and the imposing Ganay stand. In a third renovation, in preparation for Euro 2016, the municipality covered the stands with a roof, and increased its capacity to 67,000 to host the Euro 2016 games.

Before the start of each home game the song "Jump" by Van Halen is heard. When a goal is scored by Marseille in their home matches the song "Come with Me" by Puff Daddy is played.

== Kits and crest ==
Marseille's traditional kit colours were white shirts and shorts with blue socks until 1986. Since 1986, Marseille have played with white shirts, white shorts and white socks, and the blue color became lighter due to Adidas marketing but in 2012–2013, the club returned to its original kit, wearing blue socks. The blue and white colours originate from the city flag of Marseille. Since Marseille was founded by Greeks and is often nicknamed the "Cité phocéenne", the colours presumably have a Greek origin.

Club founder René Dufaure de Montmirail drew inspiration from his personal seal, which featured interlaced letters "D" and "M", to create the club's first badge. The club's motto, "Droit au but", dates from the days when the club's main sport was rugby, under the name "Football Club de Marseille". The original badge featured an ornate letter "M" superimposed over an "O", with the club motto draped across the glyph. The logo persisted for three decades, until 1935, when an art deco shield was adopted, with a simple "M" encased within the "O". In 1972, OM redesigned its logo, this time preferring a complex "M" letterform. In 1986, the club re-adopted its first badge; the logo evolved slightly over the next few decades, gaining a star in 1993 to commemorate the club's UEFA Champions League trophy. To commemorate the club's 100th anniversary in 1999, a variant featuring a golden "O" and a turquoise "M" was used; a similar 110th anniversary logo was used during the 2009–10 season. The most recent form was revealed on 17 February 2004; the "O" and "M" are rendered as a single unit in turquoise without shading or borders, and the logo is capped by the golden star representing the victory in the Champions League and sits above. The club's motto Droit Au But (French for "Straight to the Goal") also rendered in gold appears under the badge.

=== Kit suppliers and shirt sponsors ===
Years	Supplier	Sponsor
1969–1971	Le Coq Sportif	none
1971–1972	Le Coq Sportif	But!
1972–1973	Le Coq Sportif	Le Toro
1973–1974	Le Coq Sportif	Michel Axel
1974–1976	Adidas	Michel Axel
1976–1977	Adidas	Centre Barneoud
1977–1980	Adidas	Mas d'Auge
1980–1981	Adidas	Zoo de Marseille
1981–1982	Adidas	Faure
1982–1983	Adidas	Euromarché
1983–1986	Adidas	RMC
1986–1988	Adidas	Maison Bouygues
1988–1989	Adidas	Alain Afflelou
1989–1992	Adidas	Panasonic
1992–1994	Adidas	Eurest
1994–1995	Reebok	Eurest
1995–1996	Mizuno	Speedy
1996–1997	Adidas	Parmalat
1997–2001	Adidas	Ericsson
2001–2003	Adidas	Khalifa Airways
2003–2008	Adidas	Neuf Telecom
2008–2010	Adidas	Direct Énergie
2010–2012	Adidas	Betclic
2012–2017	Adidas	Intersport
2017–2018	Adidas	Orange
2018–2019	Puma	Orange
2019–2022	Puma	Uber Eats
2022–2023	Puma	Cazoo
2023–	Puma	CMA CGM

== Supporters ==
Marseille is the only football club in the world to have six supporter groups gathered in the same stadium, in the Virage Sud and Virage Nord, along with other fans in the Ganay and Jean-Bouin stands.

The lively atmosphere in the Stade Vélodrome is mainly created by the dominance of various OM supporters groups who are located in the Curva ends, behind both goals.

=== Virage Nord De Peretti ===
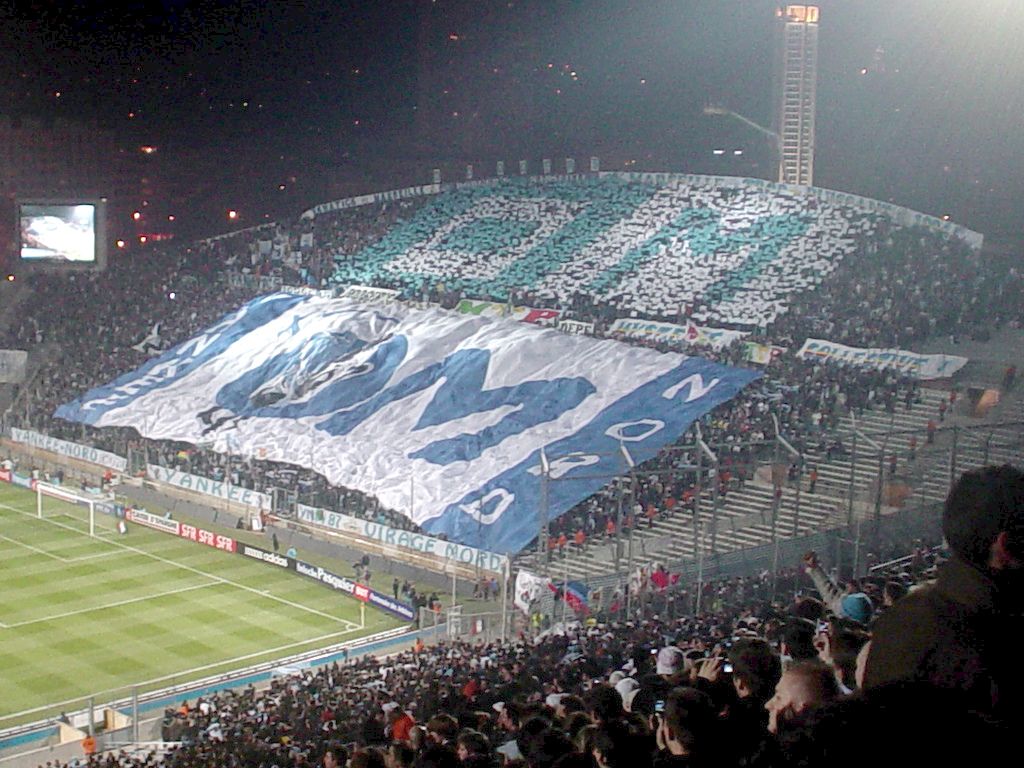
Tifo in the Virage Nord in 2007.

The Virage Nord is home to the Marseille Trop Puissant (MTP), Fanatics, and Dodger's supporters groups. This section of the stadium is next to the away enclosure, which is protected by high fences. In 2002, the Virage Nord was officially given the name of Patrice de Peretti (1972–2000), the late founder and leader of the supporters group Marseille Trop Puissant (MTP). In 2018, owner Frank McCourt and president Jacques-Henri Eyraud decided to exclude the Yankee Nord due to a number of delictuous activities, especially concerning tickets. They therefore forbid them to sell the said tickets, and the association is no longer officially recognized by the club. This led the Club des Amis de l'OM to take their place in the Virage Nord starting the following season.

=== Virage Sud Chevalier Roze ===
The Virage Sud is named after Nicolas Roze, a noble who distinguished himself in particular by creating a hospital during the Great Plague of Marseille in 1720. As with the Virage Nord, the South Curve is controlled by supporters groups with the Commando Ultra '84, the first group of ultra supporters in France created in August 1984, they are located at the bottom of the stand, occupying the entire section, while the South Winners dominate the central upper section and the upper left. The Club des Amis de l'OM fills the remaining sections on the upper right side of the stand.. Since the 2018–2019 season, the Club des Amis de l'OM has left the Virage Sud for the Virage Nord. The South Winners took advantage of this opportunity and were allowed to occupy the remaining upper-right section for their members. Since then, CU84 and the South Winners have shared the entire Virage Sud in half.

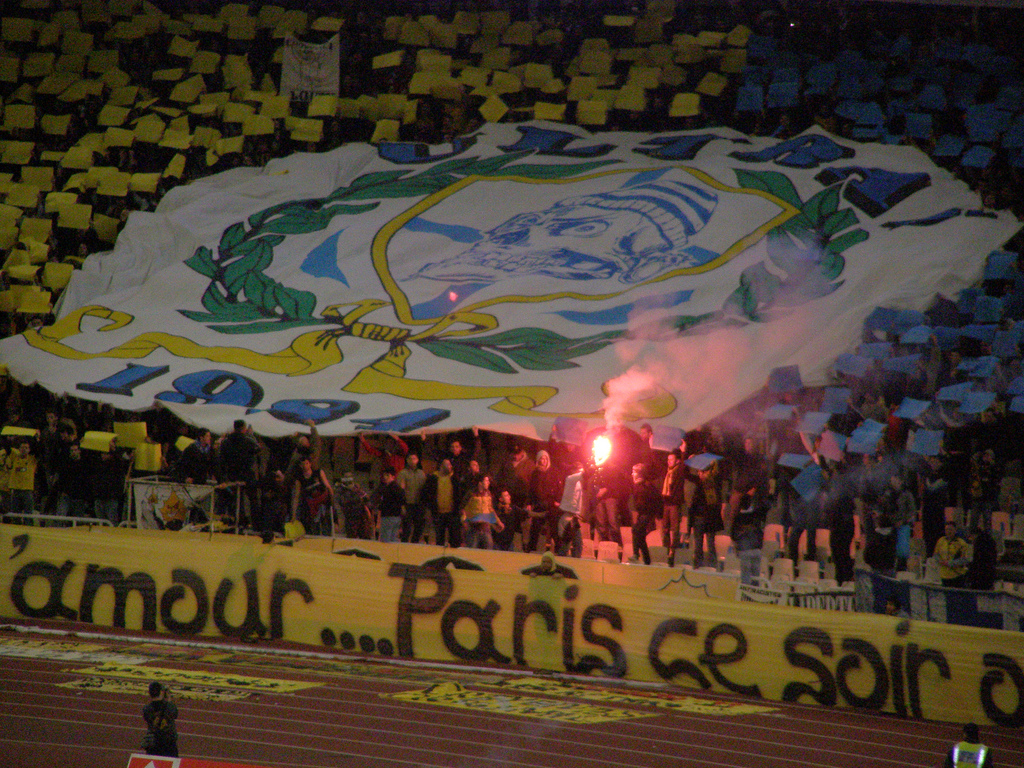
AEK Athens fans (Original 21) lifting an OM fans (Commando Ultra '84) banner.

=== Friendship with other clubs ===
Olympique de Marseille supporters have a strong relationship with fans of Greek club AEK Athens, Italian club Livorno and German club FC St. Pauli.

OM fans occasionally lift banners in support of the fellow teams.

== Players ==
=== First-team squad ===
As of 5 September 2026

Note: Flags indicate national team as defined under FIFA eligibility rules; some limited exceptions apply. Players may hold more than one non-FIFA nationality.

No.	Pos.	Nation	Player
1	GK	NED	Jeffrey de Lange
4	DF	ENG	CJ Egan-Riley
6	MF	NGR	Tochukwu Nnadi
7	MF	ENG	Angel Gomes
8	MF	ALG	Himad Abdelli
9	FW	ALG	Amine Gouiri
11	FW	FRA	Neal Maupay
13	DF	CAN	Derek Cornelius
14	FW	BRA	Igor Paixão
18	DF	CIV	Bamo Meïté
19	MF	CAF	Geoffrey Kondogbia
21	DF	MAR	Nayef Aguerd

No.	Pos.	Nation	Player
22	FW	USA	Timothy Weah (captain)
23	MF	DEN	Pierre-Emile Højbjerg
25	DF	SUI	Ulisses Garcia
29	FW	CMR	Faris Moumbagna
33	DF	ITA	Emerson Palmieri
40	GK	BEL	Jelle Van Neck
43	MF	FRA	Tadjidine Mmadi
48	MF	FRA	Keyliane Abdallah
71	MF	MLI	Nouhoum Kamissoko
74	DF	ALG	Kelyann Bezahaf
77	MF	MAR	Amine Harit
92	GK	FRA	Théo Vermot

=== Marseille B and Youth Sector ===
Note: Flags indicate national team as defined under FIFA eligibility rules; some limited exceptions apply. Players may hold more than one non-FIFA nationality.

No.	Pos.	Nation	Player
41	FW	FRA	Sofiane Sidi Ali
46	MF	FRA	Alexi Koum

No.	Pos.	Nation	Player
70	FW	MAR	Ugo Kadmiri
72	DF	ALG	Hilan Hamzaoui

=== Out on loan ===
Note: Flags indicate national team as defined under FIFA eligibility rules; some limited exceptions apply. Players may hold more than one non-FIFA nationality.

No.	Pos.	Nation	Player
—	DF	ARG	Leonardo Balerdi (at Roma until 30 June 2027)
—	MF	CIV	Hamed Traorè (at Genoa until 30 June 2027)

=== Player of the season ===
Season	Player	Nationality	Position	Notes	Ref
2001–02	Vedran Runje	Croatia	Goalkeeper	Inaugural award.	
2002–03	Daniel Van Buyten	Belgium	Defender	Also named in the UNFP Team of the Season.	
2003–04	Didier Drogba	Ivory Coast	Forward	Also won the UNFP Player of the Year award and was named in the UNFP Team of the Season.	
2004–05	Habib Beye	Senegal	Defender	Also named in the UNFP Team of the Season.	
2005–06	Franck Ribéry	France	Winger	Also won UNFP Young Player of the Year and was named in the UNFP Team of the Season.	
2006–07	Samir Nasri	France	Midfielder	Also won UNFP Young Player of the Year and was named in the UNFP Team of the Season.	
2007–08	Steve Mandanda	France	Goalkeeper	Also won UNFP Goalkeeper of the Year award and was named in the UNFP Team of the Season.	
2008–09	Benoît Cheyrou	France	Midfielder	Also named in the UNFP Team of the Season.	
2009–10	Mamadou Niang	Senegal	Forward	Also named in the UNFP Team of the Season.	
2010–11	André Ayew	Ghana	Forward		
2011–12	Nicolas Nkoulou	Cameroon	Defender	Also named in the UNFP Team of the Season.	
2012–13	Mathieu Valbuena	France	Forward	Also named in the UNFP Team of the Season.	
2013–14	André-Pierre Gignac	France	Forward		
2014–15	Dimitri Payet	France	Midfielder	Also named in the UNFP Team of the Season.	
2015–16	Steve Mandanda	France	Goalkeeper	Also won UNFP Goalkeeper of the Year award and was named in the UNFP Team of the Season.	
2016–17	Florian Thauvin	France	Winger		
2017–18	Florian Thauvin	France	Winger		
2018–19	Hiroki Sakai	Japan	Defender		
2019–20	Steve Mandanda	France	Goalkeeper		
2020–21	Boubacar Kamara	France	Midfielder		
2021–22	Dimitri Payet	France	Midfielder	Also named for the UNFP Player of the Year award and in the UNFP Team of the Season.	
2022–23	Alexis Sánchez	Chile	Forward		
2023–24	Pierre-Emerick Aubameyang	Gabon	Forward	Also named for the UNFP Player of the Year award and in the UNFP Team of the Season.	
2024–25	Adrien Rabiot	France	Midfielder		
2025–26	Mason Greenwood	England	Forward	Also named in the UNFP Team of the Season.	

== Club officials ==
=== Current technical staff ===
Role	Name
Head coach	(France) Bruno Génésio
Assistant coach	(France) Jacques Abardonado (France) Olivier Saragaglia (France) Sébastien Bichard (France) Yann Cavezza
Goalkeeping coaches	(Spain) Ricardo Segarra Agaray (France) Alexandre Salvat
Video Analysts	(France) Quentin Neboud (France) Paul Chevaleyre (France) Robin Garnier
Fitness coaches	(France) Marius Lancet
Chief Doctor	(France) Abdou Sbihi
Doctor	(France) Clément Amiot
Medical assistant	(France) Mathias Giustiniani
Osteopath	(France) Gilles Davin
Podiatrist	(France) Jean-Luc Guer
Physiotherapists	(France) Maxime Matton (France) Pierre Vespignani (France) Stéphane Ré (France) Yannick Dyduch (France) Youssef Rahou
Nutritionists	(France) Muriel Espinosa (France) Matthias Bruno

- Last updated: 12 August 2024

== Honours ==
Marseille have won the French national championship nine times; with nine Ligue 1 titles they are behind only Paris Saint-Germain, who have fourteen, and Saint-Étienne, who have ten. However, the first championship won by Marseille was in 1929, before the professional era of French football. Marseille also have the second best record in the Coupe de France, with ten titles. Marseille have achieved two championship and cup "Doubles", in 1972 and 1989. They are the first French club to win the UEFA Champions League, doing so in 1993.

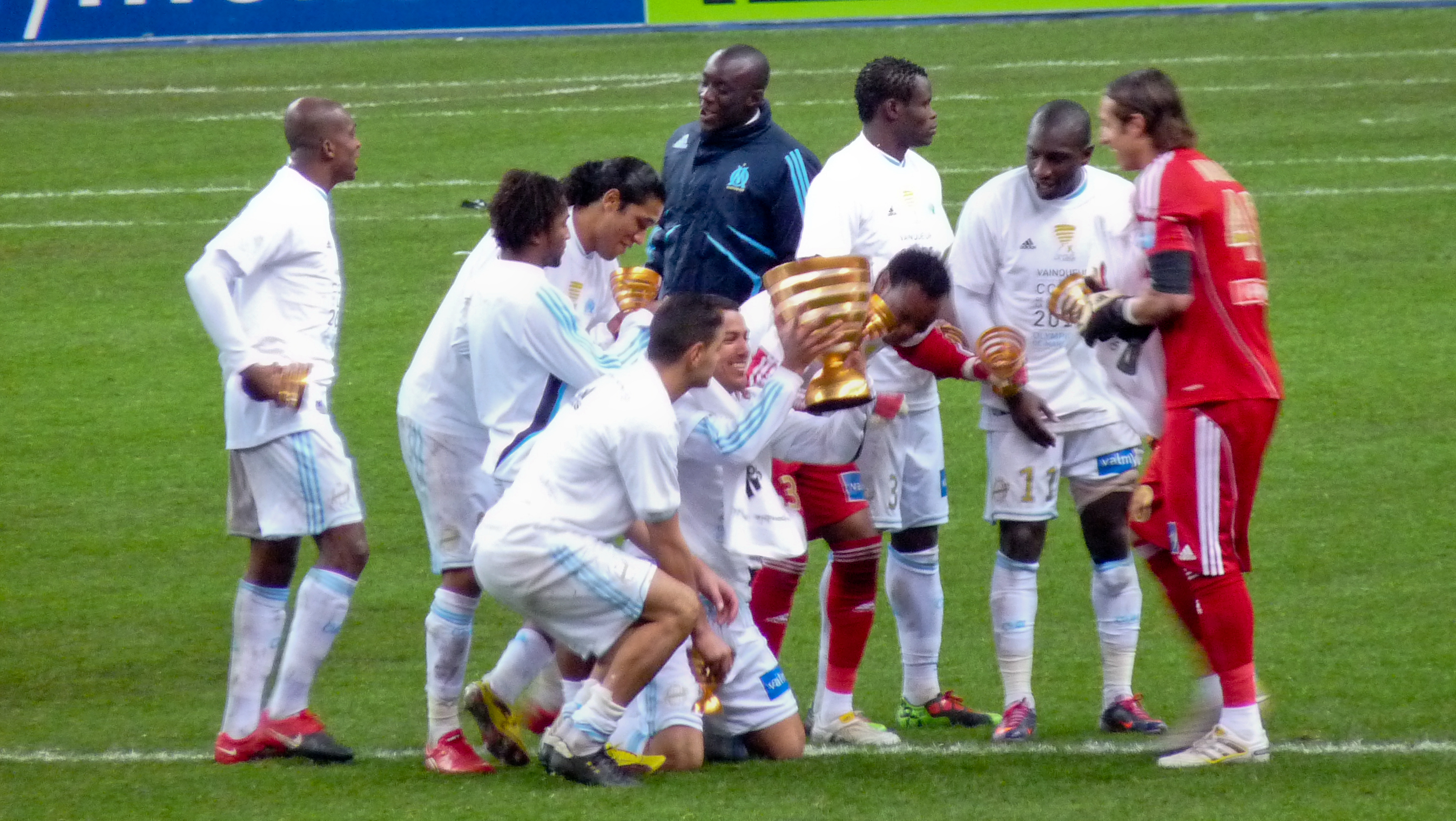
Marseille players celebrate winning the Coupe de la Ligue in 2010, the first of three consecutive wins in the competition

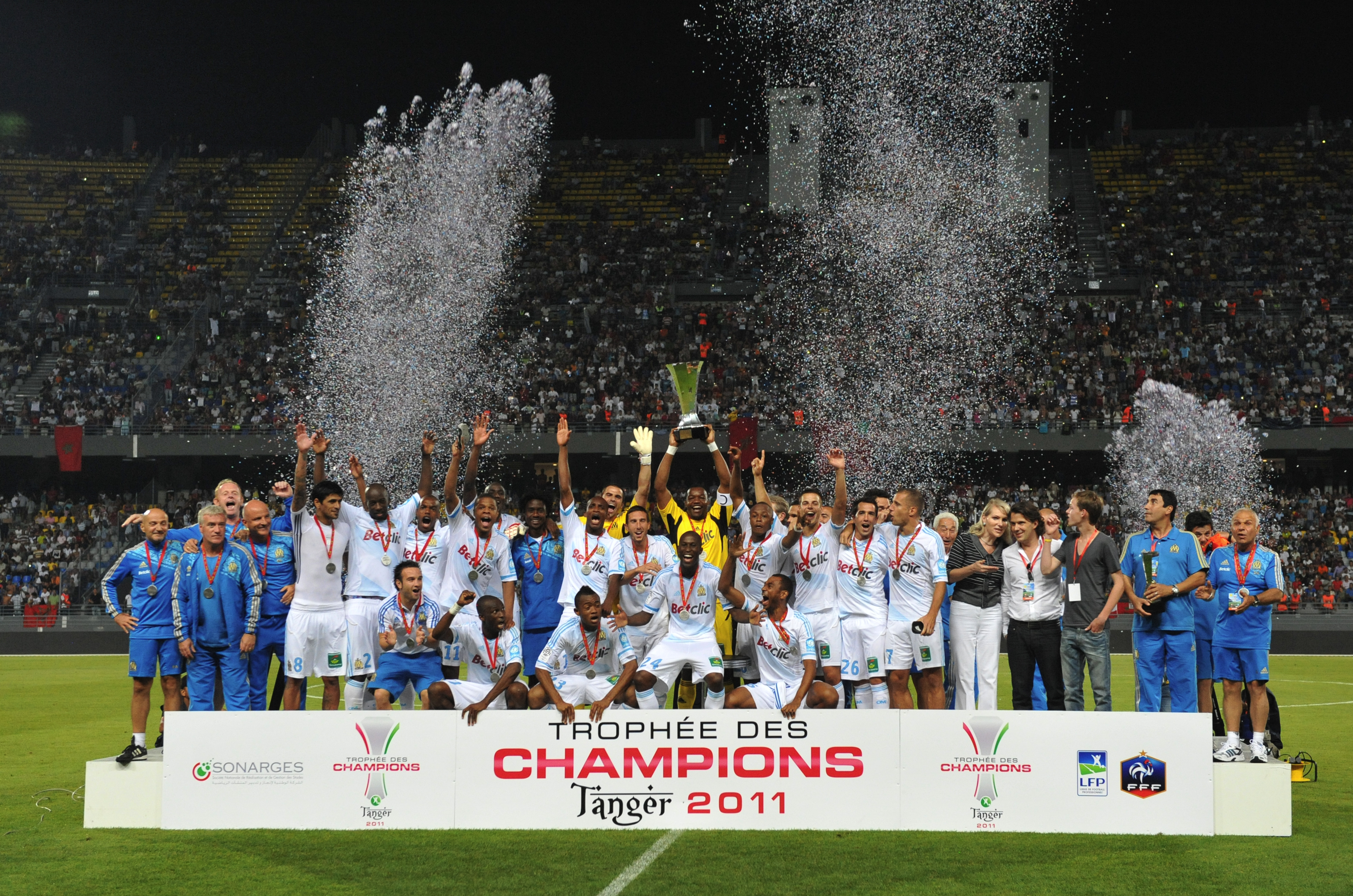
Marseille lifting the Trophée des Champions in 2011, defeating Lille 5–4

- Ligue 1 (Note: Until 2002, when the Ligue 1 was formed, the top tier of French football was known as Division 1.)
  - Winners (9): 1936–37, 1947–48, 1970–71, 1971–72, 1988–89, 1989–90, 1990–91, 1991–92, 2009–10
  - Runners-up (14): 1937–38, 1938–39, 1969–70, 1974–75, 1986–87, 1993–94, 1998–99, 2006–07, 2008–09, 2010–11, 2012–13, 2019–20, 2021–22, 2024-25
- Ligue 2
  - Winners (1): 1994–95
  - Runners-up (2): 1965–66, 1995–96
- Coupe de France
  - Winners (10): 1923–24, 1925–26, 1926–27, 1934–35, 1937–38, 1942–43, 1968–69, 1971–72, 1975–76, 1988–89
  - Runners-up (9): 1933–34, 1939–40, 1953–54, 1985–86, 1986–87, 1990–91, 2005–06, 2006–07, 2015–16
- Coupe de la Ligue
  - Winners (3): 2009–10, 2010–11, 2011–12
- Trophée des Champions (Note: The trophy was known as Challenge des Champions until 1995, and as Trophée des Champions ever since.)
  - Winners (3): 1971, 2010, 2011
  - Runners-up (4): 1969, 1972, 2020, 2025
- Coupe Charles Drago
  - Winners (1): 1957

=== International competitions ===
- European Cup / UEFA Champions League
  - Winners (1): 1992–93
  - Runners-up (1): 1990–91
- UEFA Cup / UEFA Europa League
  - Runners-up (3): 1998–99, 2003–04, 2017–18
- UEFA Intertoto Cup
  - Winners (1): 2005

=== UNFP Player of the Year ===
The following players won the UNFP Player of the Year award while playing for Olympique de Marseille:

- (Ivory Coast) Didier Drogba – 2004

=== UNFP Young Player of the Year ===
The following players won the UNFP Young Player of the Year award while playing for Olympique de Marseille:

- (France) Franck Ribéry – 2006
- (France) Samir Nasri – 2007
- (France) William Saliba – 2022

== Bibliography ==
- Pécheral, Alain (2007). La grande histoire de l'OM. L'Équipe. ISBN 978-2-916400-07-5.
- Agnello, Thierry (2008). Droit au but : l'histoire de l'Olympique de Marseille. Hugo Sport. ISBN 978-2-7556-0183-1.
