= Kelyann Bezahaf =

Algerian footballer (born 2006)

Personal information
- Date of birth: 16 May 2006 (age 20)
- Place of birth: Martigues, France
- Height: 1.80 m (5 ft 11 in)
- Position: Defender

Team information
- Current team: Marseille
- Number: 74

Youth career
- –2016: FC Châteauneuf La Mede
- 2016–2025: Marseille

Senior career*
Years	Team	Apps	(Gls)
2025–	Marseille B	24	(1)
2026–	Marseille	2	(0)

International career
2026–	Algeria U23		
- * Club domestic league appearances and goals as of 25 October 2026

Kelyann Bezahaf (Arabic: كيليان بزحاف; born 16 May 2006) is a footballer who plays as a defender for Marseille. Born in France, he is an Algeria youth international.

== Early life ==
Bezahaf was born on 16 May 2006. Born in Martigues, France, he is a native of the city and is the son of Khelifa.

== Club career ==
As a youth player, Bezahaf joined the youth academy of French side FC Châteauneuf La Mede. Following his stint there, he joined the youth academy of French Ligue 1 outfit Marseille and was promoted to the club's senior team in 2026.

On 20 September 2026, he debuted for them during a 1–2 home loss to PSG in the league. On 11 October 2026, he first started for Les Phocéens during a 2–0 away win over Troyes in the league.

== International career ==
Bezahaf is an Algeria youth international and has represented the country internationally at under-23 level.

Eligible to represent France internationally having been born in the country, he has captained the Algeria national under-23 football team.
