= Bruno Génésio =

French football manager (born 1966)

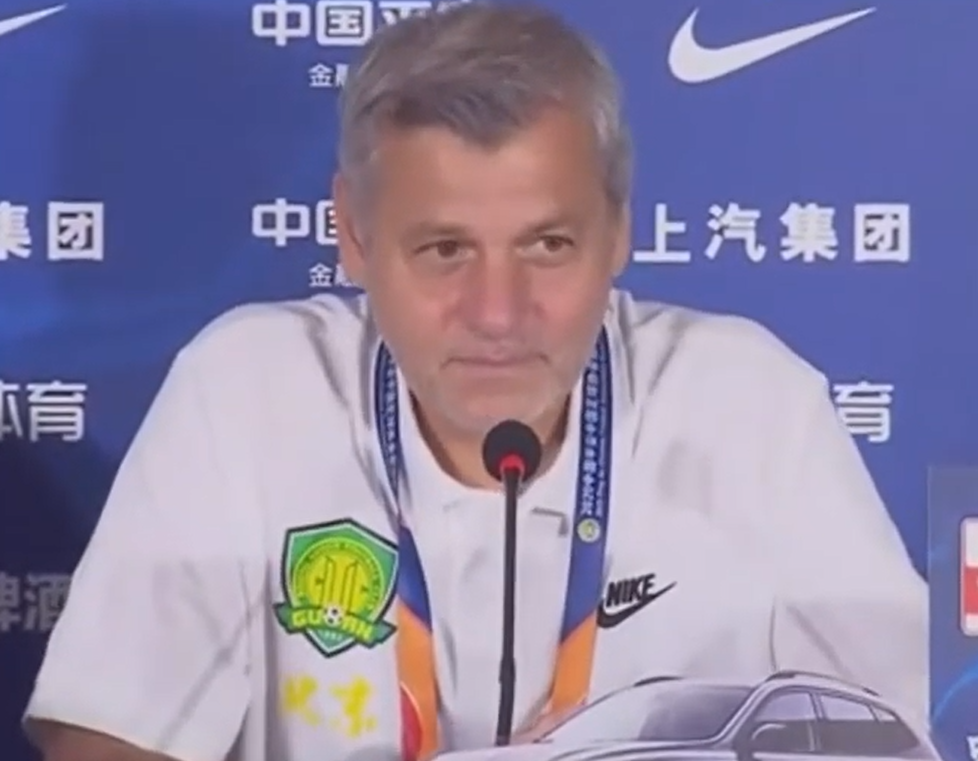
- Génésio in 2020

Personal information
- Date of birth: 1 September 1966 (age 60)
- Place of birth: Lyon, France
- Height: 1.74 m (5 ft 9 in)
- Position: Midfielder

Team information
- Current team: Marseille (head coach)

Youth career
- 1983–1985: Lyon

Senior career*
Years	Team	Apps	(Gls)
1985–1995	Lyon	171	(12)
1993–1994	→ Nice (loan)	34	(2)
1995–1996	Martigues	28	(1)
Total		233	(15)

Managerial career
- 1999–2001: Villefranche
- 2005–2006: Besançon
- 2015–2019: Lyon
- 2019–2021: Beijing Guoan
- 2021–2023: Rennes
- 2024–2026: Lille
- 2026–: Marseille
- * Club domestic league appearances and goals

Bruno Génésio (born 1 September 1966) is a French football manager and former player who played as a midfielder. He is currently the head coach of Ligue 1 club Marseille.

== Early life ==
Génésio was born on 1 September 1966 in Lyon.

== Playing career ==
Génésio is a youth exponent from Lyon. He played 171 league games in the first team between 1985 and 1995, also representing Nice on loan during the 1993–94 season.

In 1995, Génésio joined Martigues in the Ligue 1. He played 27 league matches for the club during the campaign, scoring once in a 2–1 home win against Guingamp on 18 May 1996; the match was also the last professional one of his career.

== Managerial career ==
In 1997, one year after retiring, Génésio started working as a coach for the youth categories of FC du Pays de L'Arbresle. In 1999, he was appointed manager of Villefranche in the CFA.

Génésio was sacked in 2001, with the club suffering relegation from CFA 2. He subsequently joined Racing Besançon as an assistant manager, being named at the helm of the first team for the 2005–06 season; he was relieved from his duties in March 2006.

In 2006, Génésio started to work as a scout at the first club of his senior playing career, Lyon. He also worked as an assistant manager of their reserve team before being named Rémi Garde's assistant in the first team in 2011. He kept the position under Garde's successor, Hubert Fournier, who joined the club in May 2014.

On 24 December 2015, Génésio was appointed as Lyon's head coach after the sacking of Fournier. He led the club to second position at the end of the 2015–16 Ligue 1 season. The club finished in fourth or third position in the next three Ligue 1 campaigns, with Lyon reaching the semifinals of the 2016–17 UEFA Europa League. On 14 April 2019, Génésio confirmed his departure from Lyon in the coming summer.

On 31 July 2019, Génésio joined Beijing Guoan as their head coach. On 4 March 2021, he became the head coach of Rennes. In his first two seasons at the club, Rennes finished fourth twice and reached the knockout stages of European competitions. On 19 November 2023, he departed the club by mutual consent. On 5 June 2024, he signed a two-year contract with Lille. He departed the club at the end of the 2025–26 season after securing a third-place finish and UEFA Champions League qualification.

== Managerial statistics ==
As of match played 22 November 2026

Managerial record by team and tenure
Team	From	To	Record				
Team	From	To	P	W	D	L	Win %
Villefranche	1 July 1999	30 June 2001	144	89	33	22	61.81
Racing Besançon	1 July 2005	27 March 2006	51	33	14	4	64.71
Lyon	24 December 2015	24 May 2019	185	102	36	47	55.14
Beijing Guoan	31 July 2019	6 January 2021	41	25	9	7	60.98
Rennes	4 March 2021	19 November 2023	130	67	25	38	51.54
Lille	1 July 2024	30 June 2026	99	49	21	29	49.49
Marseille	1 July 2026	present	15	7	0	8	46.67
Career total			665	372	138	155	55.94

== Honours ==
=== Player ===
Lyon

- Division 2: 1988–89

Nice

- Division 2: 1993–94

Individual

- UNFP Manager of the Year: 2021–22
