= 2025–26 Olympique de Marseille season =

Olympique de Marseille
2025–26 season
- President: Pablo Longoria
- Head coach: Roberto De Zerbi (until 11 February); Jacques Abardonado (caretaker, from 11 to 18 February); Habib Beye (from 18 February)
- Stadium: Stade Vélodrome
- Ligue 1: 5th
- Coupe de France: Quarter-finals
- Trophée des Champions: Runners-up
- UEFA Champions League: League phase
- Top goalscorer: League: Mason Greenwood (16); All: Mason Greenwood (26)
- Average home league attendance: 62,612
Home colours	Away colours	Third colours

The 2025–26 season was the 120th season in the history of Olympique de Marseille, and the club's 30th consecutive season in the French top flight. The club participated in Ligue 1, the Coupe de France, the Trophée des Champions and the UEFA Champions League. The season covers the period from 1 July 2025 to 30 June 2026.

== Players ==
=== First-team squad ===
As of 6 February 2026

Note: Flags indicate national team as defined under FIFA eligibility rules; some limited exceptions apply. Players may hold more than one non-FIFA nationality.

No.	Pos.	Nation	Player
1	GK	ARG	Gerónimo Rulli
4	DF	ENG	CJ Egan-Riley
5	DF	ARG	Leonardo Balerdi (captain)
6	MF	NGR	Tochukwu Nnadi
8	MF	ALG	Himad Abdelli
9	FW	ALG	Amine Gouiri
10	FW	ENG	Mason Greenwood
11	MF	ENG	Ethan Nwaneri (on loan from Arsenal)
12	GK	NED	Jeffrey de Lange
14	FW	BRA	Igor Paixão
17	FW	GAB	Pierre-Emerick Aubameyang

No.	Pos.	Nation	Player
18	MF	BEL	Arthur Vermeeren (on loan from RB Leipzig)
19	MF	CAF	Geoffrey Kondogbia
20	MF	CIV	Hamed Traorè (on loan from Bournemouth)
21	DF	MAR	Nayef Aguerd
22	FW	USA	Timothy Weah (on loan from Juventus)
23	MF	DEN	Pierre-Emile Højbjerg (vice-captain)
26	MF	MAR	Bilal Nadir
27	MF	NED	Quinten Timber
28	DF	FRA	Benjamin Pavard (on loan from Inter Milan)
32	DF	ARG	Facundo Medina (on loan from Lens)
33	DF	ITA	Emerson

== Transfers ==
=== In ===
No.	Pos.	Player	Transferred from	Fee	Date	Source
4	DF	(England) CJ Egan-Riley	(England) Burnley	Free	1 July 2025	
8	MF	(England) Angel Gomes	(France) Lille	Free	1 July 2025	
23	MF	(Denmark) Pierre-Emile Højbjerg	(England) Tottenham Hotspur	€20M (Note: Previously on loan)	1 July 2025	
7	FW	(France) Neal Maupay	(England) Everton	€6.8M	1 July 2025	
17	FW	(England) Jonathan Rowe	(England) Norwich City	€15M	1 July 2025	
32	DF	(Argentina) Facundo Medina	(France) Lens	Loan	2 July 2025	
14	FW	(Brazil) Igor Paixão	(Netherlands) Feyenoord	€35M	29 July 2025	
97	FW	(Gabon) Pierre-Emerick Aubameyang	(Saudi Arabia) Al Qadsiah	Free	31 July 2025	
22	DF	(United States) Timothy Weah	(Italy) Juventus	Loan (€1M)	6 August 2025	
18	MF	(Belgium) Arthur Vermeeren	(Germany) RB Leipzig	Loan (€3M)	31 August 2025	
28	DF	(France) Benjamin Pavard	(Italy) Inter Milan	Loan (€2.5M)	1 September 2025	
17	MF	(Denmark) Matt O'Riley	(England) Brighton & Hove Albion	Loan (€2M)	2 September 2025	
27	MF	(Netherlands) Quinten Timber	(Netherlands) Feyenoord	€4.5M	23 January 2026	
11	MF	(England) Ethan Nwaneri	(England) Arsenal	Loan	23 January 2026	
8	MF	(Algeria) Himad Abdelli	(France) Angers	€2.5M	2 February 2026	
6	MF	(Nigeria) Tochukwu Nnadi	(Belgium) Zulte Waregem	€6M	2 February 2026	

Total expenditure: ▼€98.3 million (excluding any other fees)

=== Out ===
No.	Pos.	Player	Transferred to	Fee	Date	Source
44	DF	(Brazil) Luis Henrique	(Italy) Inter Milan	€23M	7 June 2025	
77	DF	(Bosnia and Herzegovina) Amar Dedić	(Austria) Red Bull Salzburg	End of loan	1 July 2025	
99	DF	(Democratic Republic of the Congo) Chancel Mbemba	Unattached	Released	1 July 2025	
	DF	(France) Samuel Gigot	(Italy) Lazio	€3.5M	1 July 2025	
4	DF	(Italy) Luiz Felipe	(Spain) Rayo Vallecano	Free	7 July 2025	
3	DF	(France) Quentin Merlin	(France) Rennes	€13M	21 July 2025	
21	MF	(France) Valentin Rongier	(France) Rennes	€7M	21 July 2025	
	GK	(Spain) Pau López	(Spain) Real Betis	Free	22 July 2025	
	MF	(Canada) Ismaël Koné	(Italy) Sassuolo	Loan	29 July 2025	
17	MF	(England) Jonathan Rowe	(Italy) Bologna	Undisclosed	24 August 2025	
25	MF	(France) Adrien Rabiot	(Italy) Milan	Undisclosed	1 September 2025	
11	MF	(Morocco) Amine Harit	(Turkey) İstanbul Başakşehir	Loan	12 September 2025	
34	FW	(France) Robinio Vaz	(Italy) Roma	€25M	14 January 2026	
29	DF	(Spain) Pol Lirola	(Italy) Hellas Verona	Free	18 January 2026	
36	GK	(Spain) Rubén Blanco	Unattached	Released	19 January 2026	
24	MF	(Cameroon) François Mughe	(Cyprus) AEL Limassol	Undisclosed	27 January 2026	
7	FW	(France) Neal Maupay	(Spain) Sevilla	Loan	27 January 2026	
48	FW	(France) Keyliane Abdallah	(Spain) Gimnàstic	Loan	2 February 2026	
6	DF	(Switzerland) Ulisses Garcia	(Italy) Sassuolo	Loan	2 February 2026	
	MF	(Canada) Ismaël Koné	(Italy) Sassuolo	€10M (Note: Previously on loan)	2 February 2026	
50	MF	(France) Darryl Bakola	(Italy) Sassuolo	€10M	2 February 2026	
17	MF	(Denmark) Matt O'Riley	(England) Brighton & Hove Albion	Loan terminated	2 February 2026	
8	MF	(England) Angel Gomes	(England) Wolverhampton Wanderers	Loan	2 February 2026	
62	DF	(Panama) Michael Amir Murillo	(Turkey) Beşiktaş	€5M	6 February 2026	

Total income: ▲€86.5 million (excluding add-ons, bonuses and undisclosed figures)

== Pre-season and friendlies ==
Win Draw Loss Fixtures

20 July 2025 Friendly	Excelsior Maassluis	0–5	Marseille
12:00 CET		Report	Medina 16'; Rowe 37'; Greenwood 24', 34', 38'

21 July 2025 Friendly	Olympic Charleroi	1–1	Marseille
12:00 CET	Ferber 23'	Report	Nadir (yellow card) 43'; Murillo (red card) 53'; Greenwood 70'

26 July 2025 Friendly	Girona	0–2	Marseille
14:00 CET	López (yellow card) 34'; Stuani (yellow card) 42'; Herrera (yellow card) 60'	Report	Greenwood 35' (pen.); Rowe (yellow card) 45+2'; Gouiri 62' (pen.)

29 July 2025 Friendly	Valencia	1–1	Marseille
14:45 CET	Raba 42'	Report	Rowe 51'

2 August 2025 Friendly	Marseille	1–1	Sevilla
14:00 CET	Greenwood 25'	Report	Adams (yellow card) 11'; Carmona (yellow card) 23'; Sow 37'; Martínez (yellow card) 71'; Bueno (yellow card) 84'; Iheanacho (yellow card) 90'

9 August 2025 Friendly	Marseille	3–1	Aston Villa
19:00 CET	Greenwood 5', (yellow card) 84'; Medina (yellow card) 31'; Højbjerg (yellow card) 45+5'; Garcia (yellow card) 66'; Aubameyang 76', 79'; Egan-Riley (yellow card) 89'; Maupay (yellow card) 90+5'	Report	McGinn 8', (yellow card) 67'; Cash (yellow card) 34'; Guessand (yellow card) 70'; Malen (yellow card) 76'; Mings (yellow card) 89'; Onana (yellow card) 90+1'

== Competitions ==
=== Overall record ===
Competition	First match	Last match	Starting round	Final position	Record							
Competition	First match	Last match	Starting round	Final position	Pld	W	D	L	GF	GA	GD	Win %
Ligue 1	15 August 2025	17 May 2026	Matchday 1	5th	34	18	5	11	63	45	+18	52.94
Coupe de France	21 December 2025	4 March 2026	Round of 64	Quarter-finals	4	3	1	0	20	2	+18	75.00
Trophée des Champions	8 January 2026		Final	Runners-up	1	0	1	0	2	2	+0	0.00
UEFA Champions League	16 September 2025	28 January 2026	League phase	League phase	8	3	0	5	11	14	−3	37.50
Total					47	24	7	16	96	63	+33	51.06

Source: Soccerway

=== Ligue 1 ===
==== League table ====
Pos	Team	Pld	W	D	L	GF	GA	GD	Pts	Qualification or relegation
3	Lille	34	18	7	9	52	37	+15	61	Qualification for the Champions League league phase
4	Lyon	34	18	6	10	53	40	+13	60	Qualification for the Champions League third qualifying round
5	Marseille	34	18	5	11	63	45	+18	59	Qualification for the Europa League league phase (Note: Since the 2025–26 Coupe de France winners, Lens, qualified for the Champions League via league position, the Europa League spot awarded to the cup winners was passed to the sixth-placed team, and the Conference League spot was passed to the seventh-placed team.)
6	Rennes	34	17	8	9	59	50	+9	59	Qualification for the Europa League league phase
7	Monaco	34	16	6	12	60	54	+6	54	Qualification for the Conference League play-off round

Source: Ligue 1
Rules for classification: 1) Points; 2) Goal difference; 3) Head-to-head points; 4) Head-to-head goal difference; 5) Head-to-head goals scored; 6) Head-to-head away goals scored; 7) Goals scored; 8) Away goals scored; 9) Fair-play points (Note: Head-to-head record is used only after all the matches between the teams in question have been played).

==== Results summary ====
Overall								Home						Away					
Pld	W	D	L	GF	GA	GD	Pts	W	D	L	GF	GA	GD	W	D	L	GF	GA	GD
34	18	5	11	63	45	+18	59	11	4	2	41	20	+21	7	1	9	22	25	−3

Source: Ligue 1

==== Results by round ====
Round	1	2	3	4	5	6	7	8	9	10	11	12	13	14	15	16	17	18	19	20	21	22	23	24	25	26	27	28	29	30	31	32	33	34
Ground	A	H	A	H	H	A	A	H	A	H	A	H	A	H	A	H	H	A	H	A	A	H	A	H	A	H	H	A	H	A	H	A	A	H
Result	L	W	L	W	W	W	W	W	L	D	W	W	W	D	L	W	L	W	W	D	L	D	L	W	W	W	L	L	W	L	D	L	W	W
Position	13	7	10	7	6	3	2	1	3	3	2	2	2	3	3	3	3	3	3	3	4	4	4	4	3	3	3	4	4	6	6	7	6	5

Source: Ligue 1
A = Away; H = Home; W = Win; D = Draw; L = Loss

==== Matches ====
The match schedule was released on 27 June 2025.

15 August 2025 1	Rennes	1–0	Marseille	Rennes
20:45 CEST (UTC+2)	Aït Boudlal (red card) 31'; Al-Taamari (yellow card) 37'; Rongier (yellow card) 89'; Blas 90+1'	Report	Rabiot (yellow card) 26'; Garcia (yellow card) 84'; Balerdi (yellow card) 90+4'	Stadium: Roazhon Park; Attendance: 28,360; Referee: Jérémie Pignard

23 August 2025 2	Marseille	5–2	Paris FC	Marseille
17:00 CEST (UTC+2)	Greenwood 18' (pen.), (penalty missed) 85'; Aubameyang 24', 73'; Højbjerg 81'; Vaz (yellow card) 88', (goal) 90+6'	Report	Kebbal 28'; Simon 58'	Stadium: Stade Vélodrome; Attendance: 64,074; Referee: Marc Bollengier

31 August 2025 3	Lyon	1–0	Marseille	Décines-Charpieu
20:45 CEST (UTC+2)	Abner (yellow card) 22'; Šulc (yellow card) 80'; Balerdi 87' (o.g.)	Report	Egan-Riley (red card) 29'; Gomes (yellow card) 41'; Murillo (yellow card) 90+4'	Stadium: Parc Olympique Lyonnais; Attendance: 52,095; Referee: François Letexier

12 September 2025 4	Marseille	4–0	Lorient	Marseille
20:45 CEST (UTC+2)	Greenwood 13'; Pavard 20', (yellow card) 26'; Gomes 33', (yellow card) 53'; Paixão (yellow card) 86'; Aguerd 90+3'	Report	Yongwa (red card) 10'; Karim (yellow card) 55'; Faye (yellow card) 71'	Stadium: Stade Vélodrome; Attendance: 64,098; Referee: Thomas Léonard

22 September 2025 5	Marseille	1–0	Paris Saint-Germain	Marseille
20:00 CEST (UTC+2)	Marquinhos 5' (o.g.); Pavard (yellow card) 18'; Weah (yellow card) 50'; Murillo (yellow card) 90+5'	Report		Stadium: Stade Vélodrome; Attendance: 66,190; Referee: Jérôme Brisard
Note: The match was originally scheduled for 21 September 2025 at 20:45, but was postponed due to heavy storms.

26 September 2025 6	Strasbourg	1–2	Marseille	Strasbourg
20:45 CEST (UTC+2)	Emegha (yellow card) 45+1'; Ouattara 49'; Amo-Ameyaw (yellow card) 66'	Report	Aguerd (yellow card) 24'; Murillo (yellow card) 27', (goal) 90+1'; O'Riley (yellow card) 38'; Balerdi (yellow card) 45'; Aubameyang 78'	Stadium: Stade de la Meinau; Attendance: 23,262; Referee: Jérémie Pignard

4 October 2025 7	Metz	0–3	Marseille	Metz
17:00 CEST (UTC+2)		Report	Paixão 51'; O'Riley 69'; Gouiri 76'	Stadium: Stade Saint-Symphorien; Attendance: 28,300; Referee: Clément Turpin

18 October 2025 8	Marseille	6–2	Le Havre	Marseille
21:05 CEST (UTC+2)	Greenwood 35' (pen.), 67', 72', 76'; Nadir (yellow card) 78'; Vaz 88'; Murillo (yellow card) 90', (goal) 90+3'	Report	Kechta 24'; Lloris (red card) 34'; Zouaoui (yellow card) 45+4'; Touré 90+2'	Stadium: Stade Vélodrome; Attendance: 64,869; Referee: Bastien Dechepy

25 October 2025 9	Lens	2–1	Marseille	Lens
21:05 CEST (UTC+2)	Édouard 23' (pen.); Thomasson (yellow card) 34'; Pavard 53' (o.g.); Guilavogui (yellow card) 84'; Sangaré (yellow card) 88'	Report	Greenwood 17', (yellow card) 86'; Pavard (yellow card) 22'; Balerdi (yellow card) 87'	Stadium: Stade Bollaert-Delelis; Attendance: 38,223; Referee: Stéphanie Frappart

29 October 2025 10	Marseille	2–2	Angers	Marseille
21:05 CET (UTC+1)	Vaz 52', 70'; Højbjerg (yellow card) 90+2'; Aguerd (yellow card) 90+6'	Report	Raolisoa (yellow card) 3'; Cherif 25'; Camara 90+6'	Stadium: Stade Vélodrome; Attendance: 64,599; Referee: Thomas Léonard

1 November 2025 11	Auxerre	0–1	Marseille	Auxerre
21:05 CET (UTC+1)	Diomandé (yellow card) 80' (yellow-red card) 90+3'; Namaso (yellow card) 87'	Report	Gomes (yellow card) 26', (goal) 30'; Emerson (yellow card) 36'; O'Riley (yellow card) 39'; Vaz (yellow card) 45+3'; Garcia (red card) 65'	Stadium: Stade de l'Abbé-Deschamps; Attendance: 16,529; Referee: Benoît Bastien

8 November 2025 12	Marseille	3–0	Brest	Marseille
17:00 CET (UTC+1)	Gomes 25'; Greenwood 33' (pen.); Aubameyang 81'	Report	Mboup (yellow card) 37'	Stadium: Stade Vélodrome; Attendance: 66,279; Referee: Willy Delajod

21 November 2025 13	Nice	1–5	Marseille	Nice
20:45 CET (UTC+1)	Mendy (yellow card) 14'; Abdi (yellow card) 37'; Cho 63'	Report	Aubameyang 11'; Greenwood 33', 53'; Rulli (yellow card) 37'; Kondogbia (yellow card) 45+1'; Weah 58'; Paixão 74'	Stadium: Allianz Riviera; Attendance: 27,089; Referee: Jérémie Pignard

29 November 2025 14	Marseille	2–2	Toulouse	Marseille
21:05 CET (UTC+1)	Gomes (yellow card) 42'; Paixão 66'; Højbjerg 74', (yellow card) 75'	Report	Emersonn 14'; McKenzie (yellow card) 81'; Hidalgo 90+2'	Stadium: Stade Vélodrome; Attendance: 65,163; Referee: Eric Wattellier

5 December 2025 15	Lille	1–0	Marseille	Villeneuve-d'Ascq
21:00 CET (UTC+1)	Mbappé 10'; Özer (yellow card) 90+1'	Report	Vermeeren (yellow card) 26'	Stadium: Stade Pierre-Mauroy; Attendance: 48,258; Referee: Jérôme Brisard

14 December 2025 16	Marseille	1–0	Monaco	Marseille
20:45 CET (UTC+1)	Kondogbia (yellow card) 40'; Greenwood 82', (yellow card) 83'	Report	Vanderson (yellow card) 64'	Stadium: Stade Vélodrome; Attendance: 64,509; Referee: François Letexier

4 January 2026 17	Marseille	0–2	Nantes	Marseille
15:00 CET (UTC+1)	Vermeeren (red card) 26'; Nadir (yellow card) 54' (yellow-red card) 56'	Report	Centonze 31'; Mwanga (yellow card) 33'; Tabibou (yellow card) 51'; Cabella 88' (pen.); Guirassy (yellow card) 90+4'	Stadium: Stade Vélodrome; Attendance: 64,780; Referee: Marc Bollengier

17 January 2026 18	Angers	2–5	Marseille	Angers
21:05 CET (UTC+1)	Sbaï 45+2'; Belkebla (yellow card) 68'; Allevinah 90+2'	Report	Gouiri 19'; Greenwood 24'; Traorè 34'; Weah 40'; Aubameyang (yellow card) 68'; Paixão 88'	Stadium: Stade Raymond Kopa; Attendance: 15,266; Referee: Ruddy Buquet

24 January 2026 19	Marseille	3–1	Lens	Marseille
21:05 CET (UTC+1)	Gouiri 3', 75'; Nwaneri 13'	Report	Saïd (yellow card) 37'; Sangaré (yellow card) 61'; Thauvin (yellow card) 70'; Fofana 85'	Stadium: Stade Vélodrome; Attendance: 52,673; Referee: Benoît Bastien

31 January 2026 20	Paris FC	2–2	Marseille	Paris
17:00 CET (UTC+1)	Lopez (yellow card) 43'; Ikoné 82'; Kebbal 90+4' (pen.)	Report	Greenwood 18' (pen.); Aubameyang 53'; Medina (yellow card) 72'; Traorè (yellow card) 81'; Rulli (yellow card) 90+2'; Nadir (yellow card) 90+6'	Stadium: Stade Jean-Bouin; Attendance: 19,209; Referee: Jérémie Pignard

8 February 2026 21	Paris Saint-Germain	5–0	Marseille	Paris
20:45 CET (UTC+1)	Vitinha (yellow card) 9'; Dembélé 12', 37'; Zaïre-Emery (yellow card) 59'; Medina 64' (o.g.); Kvaratskhelia 66'; Lee 74'	Report	Emerson (yellow card) 82'; Balerdi (yellow card) 90+1'	Stadium: Parc des Princes; Attendance: 47,926; Referee: Willy Delajod

14 February 2026 22	Marseille	2–2	Strasbourg	Marseille
17:00 CET (UTC+1)	Greenwood 14'; Pavard (yellow card) 26'; Aguerd (yellow card) 42'; Gouiri 47'; Paixão (yellow card) 72'; Weah (yellow card) 90+8'	Report	Nanasi 73'; Panichelli (yellow card) 83', (goal) 90+7' (pen.); Barco (yellow card) 90+9'	Stadium: Stade Vélodrome; Attendance: 59,238; Referee: François Letexier

20 February 2026 23	Brest	2–0	Marseille	Brest
20:45 CET (UTC+1)	Ajorque 10', 29', (yellow card) 71'	Report	Højbjerg (yellow card) 67'; Timber (yellow card) 78'; Greenwood (penalty missed) 82'; Nwaneri (yellow card) 89'; Nadir (yellow card) 90+5'	Stadium: Stade Francis-Le Blé; Attendance: 14,482; Referee: Romain Lissorgue

1 March 2026 24	Marseille	3–2	Lyon	Marseille
20:45 CET (UTC+1)	Paixão 52'; Kondogbia (yellow card) 74'; Aubameyang 81', 90+1'; Aguerd (yellow card) 83'; Abdelli (yellow card) 90+8'	Report	Tolisso 3'; Mata (yellow card) 30'; Morton (yellow card) 45+1'; Himbert 76'	Stadium: Stade Vélodrome; Attendance: 66,225; Referee: Jérôme Brisard

7 March 2026 25	Toulouse	0–1	Marseille	Toulouse
21:05 CET (UTC+1)	Dønnum (yellow card) 59'; McKenzie (yellow card) 64'	Report	Medina (yellow card) 12'; Greenwood 18', (yellow card) 59'; Weah (yellow card) 60'	Stadium: Stadium de Toulouse; Attendance: 31,788; Referee: Bastien Dechepy

13 March 2026 26	Marseille	1–0	Auxerre	Marseille
20:45 CET (UTC+1)	Medina (yellow card) 22'; Egan-Riley (yellow card) 37'; Paixão (yellow card) 78'; Gouiri 79'; Timber (yellow card) 90+1'	Report	Okoh (yellow card) 45'; Diomande (yellow card) 90+4'	Stadium: Stade Vélodrome; Attendance: 55,766; Referee: Marc Bollengier

22 March 2026 27	Marseille	1–2	Lille	Marseille
17:15 CET (UTC+1)	Greenwood (yellow card) 13'; Nwaneri 43'	Report	Ngoy (yellow card) 1'; Verdonk (yellow card) 13'; Haraldsson (yellow card) 13'; Meunier 49'; Giroud 86'	Stadium: Stade Vélodrome; Attendance: 59,865; Referee: Benoît Bastien

5 April 2026 28	Monaco	2–1	Marseille	Monaco
20:45 CEST (UTC+2)	Camara (yellow card) 8'; Golovin 59'; Kehrer (yellow card) 70'; Balogun 74'	Report	Medina (yellow card) 34'; Gouiri 85'; Balerdi (yellow card) 87'	Stadium: Stade Louis II; Attendance: 10,495; Referee: Clément Turpin

10 April 2026 29	Marseille	3–1	Metz	Marseille
21:05 CEST (UTC+2)	Aubameyang 13'; Medina (yellow card) 45+2'; Paixão 48'; Traorè 90+3'	Report	Tsitaishvili 49'; Colin (yellow card) 56'; Kouao (yellow card) 84'	Stadium: Stade Vélodrome; Attendance: 63,923; Referee: Stéphanie Frappart

18 April 2026 30	Lorient	2–0	Marseille	Lorient
17:00 CEST (UTC+2)	Katseris 28'; Dieng 58'	Report	Pavard (yellow card) 57'; Nadir (yellow card) 74'; Weah (yellow card) 89'	Stadium: Stade du Moustoir; Attendance: 16,585; Referee: Eric Wattellier

26 April 2026 31	Marseille	1–1	Nice	Marseille
20:45 CEST (UTC+2)	Emerson (yellow card) 29'; Medina (yellow card) 44'; Højbjerg 66'; Weah (yellow card) 86'; Rulli (yellow card) 87'	Report	Wahi (yellow card) 44', (goal) 88' (pen.)	Stadium: Stade Vélodrome; Attendance: 60,021; Referee: Willy Delajod

2 May 2026 32	Nantes	3–0	Marseille	Nantes
15:00 CEST (UTC+2)	Abline (yellow card) 17', (goal) 58'; Ganago 50'; Cabella 54'	Report	Timber (yellow card) 31'; Lago (yellow card) 49'; Medina (yellow card) 81'	Stadium: Stade de la Beaujoire; Attendance: 28,308; Referee: Jérémie Pignard

10 May 2026 33	Le Havre	0–1	Marseille	Le Havre
21:00 CEST (UTC+2)	Boufal (yellow card) 41', (penalty missed) 71'; Seko (yellow card) 48'; Zouaoui (yellow card) 57'; Ebonog (yellow card) 88'	Report	Greenwood 55' (pen.); Nnadi (yellow card) 59'; Timber (yellow card) 81'	Stadium: Stade Océane; Attendance: 22,201; Referee: Benoît Bastien

17 May 2026 34	Marseille	3–1	Rennes	Marseille
21:00 CEST (UTC+2)	Højbjerg 2', (yellow card) 49'; Gouiri 10', (yellow card) 76'; Aubameyang 55'; Pavard (yellow card) 90+5'	Report	Camara (yellow card) 79'; Lepaul 84'	Stadium: Stade Vélodrome; Attendance: 62,124; Referee: Ruddy Buquet

=== Coupe de France ===
21 December 2025 Round of 64	Bourg-Péronnas	0–6	Marseille	Bourg-en-Bresse
14:45 CET (UTC+1)		Report	Balerdi 8'; Greenwood 59'; Højbjerg 64'; Paixão 66'; Nadir 77'; Mmadi 87'	Stadium: Stade Marcel-Verchère; Attendance: 5,632; Referee: Stéphanie Frappart

13 January 2026 Round of 32	Bayeux	0–9	Marseille	Caen
21:00 CET (UTC+1)		Report	Gomes 13', (yellow card) 24'; Traorè 19'; Greenwood 26', 49', 90'; Gouiri 32', 55'; Egan-Riley 80'; Maupay 86'	Stadium: Stade Michel d'Ornano; Attendance: 19,955; Referee: Gaël Angoula

3 February 2026 Round of 16	Marseille	3–0	Rennes	Marseille
21:10 CET (UTC+1)	Gouiri 2'; Nwaneri (yellow card) 22'; Højbjerg (yellow card) 45+3'; Greenwood 46'; Aubameyang 83'; Kondogbia (yellow card) 90'; Balerdi (yellow card) 90'	Report	Seidu (yellow card) 42'; Merlin (yellow card) 67'; Aït Boudlal (yellow card) 74'; Embolo (yellow card) 90'	Stadium: Stade Vélodrome; Attendance: 61,783; Referee: Thomas Léonard

4 March 2026 Quarter-finals	Marseille	2–2 (3–4 p)	Toulouse	Marseille
21:00 CET (UTC+1)	Greenwood 2' (pen.), (yellow card) 35'; Abdelli (yellow card) 11'; Paixão 56'	Report	Gboho 13'; Emersonn (yellow card) 37'; Cresswell 61'	Stadium: Stade Vélodrome; Attendance: 63,465; Referee: Jérémie Pignard
	Penalties
	Greenwood (penalty scored); Aubameyang (penalty scored); Balerdi (penalty missed); Aguerd (penalty scored); Nwaneri (penalty missed)		(penalty scored) Dønnum; (penalty scored) Gboho; (penalty scored) Sidibé; (penalty missed) Cásseres; (penalty scored) Diop

=== Trophée des Champions ===
8 January 2026 Final	Paris Saint-Germain	2–2 (4–1 p)	Marseille	Kuwait City, Kuwait
21:00 AST (UTC+3)	Dembélé 13'; Zaïre-Emery (yellow card) 63'; Ramos 90+5'	Report	Weah (yellow card) 48'; Højbjerg (yellow card) 53'; Greenwood 76' (pen.); Medina (yellow card) 86'; Pacho 87' (o.g.); Aubameyang (yellow card) 89'	Stadium: Jaber Al-Ahmad International Stadium; Attendance: 52,215; Referee: Thomas Léonard
	Penalties
	Ramos (penalty scored); Vitinha (penalty scored); Mendes (penalty scored); Doué (penalty scored)		(penalty missed) O'Riley; (penalty missed) Traorè; (penalty scored) Murillo

=== UEFA Champions League ===
==== League phase ====
The draw for the league phase was held on 28 August 2025.

Pos	Team	Pld	W	D	L	GF	GA	GD	Pts	Qualification
23	(Norwegian Football Federation) Bodø/Glimt	8	2	3	3	14	15	−1	9	Advance to knockout phase play-offs (unseeded)
24	(Portuguese Football Federation) Benfica	8	3	0	5	10	12	−2	9	Advance to knockout phase play-offs (unseeded)
25	(French Football Federation) Marseille	8	3	0	5	11	14	−3	9	
26	(Cyprus Football Association) Pafos	8	2	3	3	8	11	−3	9	
27	(Royal Belgian Football Association) Union Saint-Gilloise	8	3	0	5	8	17	−9	9	

Source: UEFA
Rules for classification: League phase tiebreakers

Round	1	2	3	4	5	6	7	8
Ground	A	H	A	H	H	A	H	A
Result	L	W	L	L	W	W	L	L
Position	25	12	18	25	21	16	19	25

Source: UEFA
A = Away; H = Home; W = Win; D = Draw; L = Loss

16 September 2025 1	Real Madrid (Spain)	2–1	(France) Marseille	Madrid, Spain
21:00 CEST (UTC+2)	Mbappé 29' (pen.), 81' (pen.); Tchouaméni (yellow card) 35'; Militão (yellow card) 54'; Carvajal (red card) 72'; Carreras (yellow card) 90+7'	Report	Weah 22'; Pavard (yellow card) 46'; Medina (yellow card) 75'	Stadium: Santiago Bernabéu; Attendance: 74,610; Referee: Irfan Peljto (Bosnia and Herzegovina)

30 September 2025 2	Marseille (France)	4–0	(Netherlands) Ajax	Marseille, France
21:00 CEST (UTC+2)	Paixão 6', 12'; Greenwood 26'; Aubameyang 52'; Højbjerg (yellow card) 79'; Aguerd (yellow card) 88'	Report	Lucas Rosa (yellow card) 34'; Itakura (yellow card) 66'; Gaaei (yellow card) 76'	Stadium: Stade Vélodrome; Attendance: 65,771; Referee: Anthony Taylor (England)

22 October 2025 3	Sporting CP (Portugal)	2–1	(France) Marseille	Lisbon, Portugal
20:00 WEST (UTC+1)	Catamo 69'; Alisson 86'; Araújo (yellow card) 90'; Gonçalves (yellow card) 90+5'	Report	Balerdi (yellow card) 2'; Paixão 14'; Emerson (yellow card) 39' (yellow-red card) 45+2'; Pavard (yellow card) 90'	Stadium: Estádio José Alvalade; Attendance: 46,766; Referee: Rade Obrenović (Slovenia)

5 November 2025 4	Marseille (France)	0–1	(Italy) Atalanta	Marseille, France
21:00 CET (UTC+1)	O'Riley (yellow card) 67'; Aguerd (yellow card) 90+8'	Report	De Ketelaere (penalty missed) 14'; Éderson (yellow card) 26'; Kossounou (yellow card) 50'; Samardžić 90'; Bellanova (yellow card) 90+2'	Stadium: Stade Vélodrome; Attendance: 64,319; Referee: José María Sánchez Martínez (Spain)

25 November 2025 5	Marseille (France)	2–1	(England) Newcastle United	Marseille, France
21:00 CET (UTC+1)	Balerdi (yellow card) 3'; Bakola (yellow card) 36'; Aubameyang 46', 50'; Emerson (yellow card) 52'; Greenwood (yellow card) 67'; Vermeeren (yellow card) 84'	Report	Barnes 6'; Willock (yellow card) 20'; Gordon (yellow card) 42'; Burn (yellow card) 65'	Stadium: Stade Vélodrome; Attendance: 64,521; Referee: Maurizio Mariani (Italy)

9 December 2025 6	Union Saint-Gilloise (Belgium)	2–3	(France) Marseille	Brussels, Belgium
21:00 CET (UTC+1)	Khalaily 5', 71'; Burgess (yellow card) 59'; Zorgane (yellow card) 68'; Niang (yellow card) 80'; David (yellow card) 90'	Report	Paixão 15'; Weah (yellow card) 28'; Greenwood 41', 58'	Stadium: Constant Vanden Stock Stadium; Attendance: 16,214; Referee: João Pinheiro (Portugal)

21 January 2026 7	Marseille (France)	0–3	(England) Liverpool	Marseille, France
21:00 CET (UTC+1)	Pavard (yellow card) 48'	Report	Szoboszlai 45+1'; Rulli 72' (o.g.); Gakpo 90+3'	Stadium: Stade Vélodrome; Attendance: 65,631; Referee: Slavko Vinčić (Slovenia)

28 January 2026 8	Club Brugge (Belgium)	3–0	(France) Marseille	Bruges, Belgium
21:00 CET (UTC+1)	Diakohn 4'; Vermant 11'; Vanaken (yellow card) 50'; Stanković 79'	Report	Murillo (yellow card) 22'; Gouiri (yellow card) 80'	Stadium: Jan Breydel Stadium; Attendance: 26,361; Referee: Marco Guida (Italy)

== Statistics ==
=== Appearances and goals ===
No.	Pos	Nat	Player	Total		Ligue 1		Coupe de France		Trophée des Champions		UEFA Champions League	
No.	Pos	Nat	Player	Apps	Goals	Apps	Goals	Apps	Goals	Apps	Goals	Apps	Goals
Goalkeepers
1	GK	(Argentina) ARG	Gerónimo Rulli	39	0	29	0	1	0	1	0	8	0
12	GK	(Netherlands) NED	Jeffrey de Lange	8	0	5	0	3	0	0	0	0	0
Defenders
4	DF	(England) ENG	CJ Egan-Riley	16	1	8+3	0	0+2	1	0	0	1+2	0
5	DF	(Argentina) ARG	Leonardo Balerdi	36	1	21+5	0	3	1	1	0	5+1	0
21	DF	(Morocco) MAR	Nayef Aguerd	22	1	16	1	1	0	0	0	5	0
28	DF	(France) FRA	Benjamin Pavard	37	1	22+5	1	2+1	0	1	0	6	0
32	DF	(Argentina) ARG	Facundo Medina	26	0	16+1	0	3+1	0	1	0	4	0
33	DF	(Italy) ITA	Emerson	37	0	23+5	0	3	0	1	0	5	0
72	DF	(Algeria) ALG	Hilan Hamzaoui Slimani	1	0	0+1	0	0	0	0	0	0	0
Midfielders
6	MF	(Nigeria) NGR	Tochukwu Nnadi	8	0	4+4	0	0	0	0	0	0	0
8	MF	(Algeria) ALG	Himad Abdelli	9	0	1+7	0	1	0	0	0	0	0
11	MF	(England) ENG	Ethan Nwaneri	11	2	3+6	2	1+1	0	0	0	0	0
18	MF	(Belgium) BEL	Arthur Vermeeren	26	0	10+10	0	1	0	0	0	4+1	0
19	MF	(Central African Republic) CAF	Geoffrey Kondogbia	17	0	9+1	0	1+1	0	1	0	3+1	0
20	MF	(Ivory Coast) CIV	Hamed Traorè	19	3	6+7	2	1+2	1	0+1	0	2	0
23	MF	(Denmark) DEN	Pierre-Emile Højbjerg	43	5	30+2	4	2	1	1	0	7+1	0
26	MF	(Morocco) MAR	Bilal Nadir	28	1	5+15	0	1+3	1	0	0	1+3	0
27	MF	(Netherlands) NED	Quinten Timber	16	0	14+1	0	1	0	0	0	0	0
71	MF	(Mali) MLI	Nouhoum Kamissoko	3	0	0+3	0	0	0	0	0	0	0
76	MF	(France) FRA	Tadjidine Mmadi	6	1	0+3	0	0+2	1	0	0	0+1	0
Forwards
9	FW	(Algeria) ALG	Amine Gouiri	28	11	15+7	8	2	3	1	0	2+1	0
10	FW	(England) ENG	Mason Greenwood	45	26	29+3	16	4	6	1	1	8	3
14	FW	(Brazil) BRA	Igor Paixão	42	12	22+8	6	3	2	1	0	5+3	4
17	FW	(Gabon) GAB	Pierre-Emerick Aubameyang	41	14	23+7	10	1+1	1	0+1	0	6+2	3
22	FW	(United States) USA	Timothy Weah	41	3	26+3	2	3+1	0	1	0	6+1	1
35	FW	(France) FRA	Ugo Lamare El Kadmiri	3	0	0+3	0	0	0	0	0	0	0
78	FW	(Ivory Coast) CIV	Ange Lago	2	0	0+2	0	0	0	0	0	0	0
Players transferred/loaned out during the season
6	DF	(Switzerland) SUI	Ulisses Garcia	6	0	2+2	0	0	0	0	0	1+1	0
7	FW	(France) FRA	Neal Maupay	3	1	0+1	0	1+1	1	0	0	0	0
8	MF	(England) ENG	Angel Gomes	20	4	12+2	3	2	1	0	0	0+4	0
13	DF	(Canada) CAN	Derek Cornelius	2	0	0+2	0	0	0	0	0	0	0
17	MF	(Denmark) DEN	Matt O'Riley	25	1	6+9	1	2	0	0+1	0	4+3	0
17	FW	(England) ENG	Jonathan Rowe	1	0	1	0	0	0	0	0	0	0
25	MF	(France) FRA	Adrien Rabiot	1	0	1	0	0	0	0	0	0	0
29	DF	(Spain) ESP	Pol Lirola	3	0	0+3	0	0	0	0	0	0	0
34	FW	(France) FRA	Robinio Vaz	19	4	3+11	4	0+1	0	0	0	0+4	0
36	GK	(Spain) ESP	Rubén Blanco	0	0	0	0	0	0	0	0	0	0
50	MF	(France) FRA	Darryl Bakola	10	0	0+8	0	0+1	0	0	0	1	0
62	DF	(Panama) PAN	Michael Amir Murillo	25	2	11+5	2	1	0	0+1	0	4+3	0

Source: Competitions
