= Bilal Nadir =

Moroccan footballer (born 2003)

Bilal Nadir بلال نذير
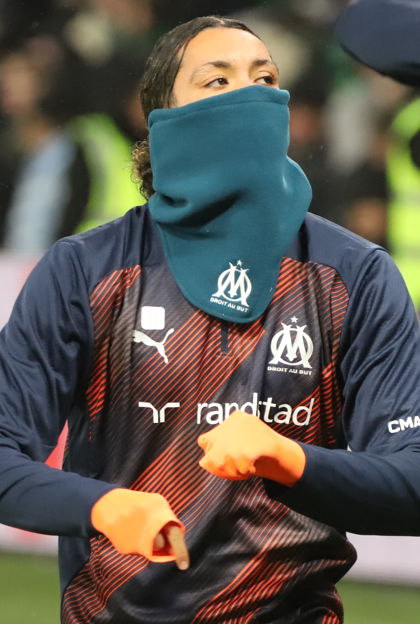
- Nadir training with Marseille in 2024

Personal information
- Date of birth: 28 November 2003 (age 22)
- Place of birth: Nice, France
- Height: 1.72 m (5 ft 8 in)
- Position: Midfielder

Team information
- Current team: Hamburger SV
- Number: 4

Youth career
- 2009–2021: Nice

Senior career*
Years	Team	Apps	(Gls)
2020–2021	Nice B	1	(0)
2021–2023	Marseille B	39	(3)
2023–2026	Marseille	40	(1)
2026–	Hamburger SV	4	(0)

International career^{‡}
2019	France U16	3	(0)
2022	France U19	3	(0)
2023	Morocco U23	2	(1)
- * Club domestic league appearances and goals as of 24 October 2026 ‡ National team caps and goals as of 21 November 2023

Bilal Nadir (Arabic: بلال نذير; born 28 November 2003) is a professional footballer who plays as a midfielder for Bundesliga club Hamburger SV. Born in France, he is a youth international for Morocco.

== Club career ==
Nadir is a youth product of Nice's youth academy, and made his senior debut with their reserves in 2020. He transferred to Marseille on 1 July 2021 signing his first professional contract. He shortly after started playing with Marseille's reserves in the Championnat National 2. He made his professional debut with the senior Marseille team as a late substitute in a 4–0 Ligue 1 loss to Paris Saint-Germain on 24 September 2023. In January 2024, he sustained an ACL injury which sidelined him for several months. He scored his first goal in a 5–1 victory over Le Havre on 5 January 2025.

On 24 July 2026, Nadir joined Bundesliga club Hamburger SV on a free transfer, signing a long-term contract.

== International career ==
Nadir was born in France to a Moroccan parents. He is a youth international for France, having played up to the France U19s. He was called up to the Morocco U23s for a set of friendlies in November 2023, scoring on his debut against the United States U23s on 23 November 2023.

== Career statistics ==
As of match played 24 October 2026

Appearances and goals by club, season and competition
Club	Season	League			Coupe de France		Europe		Other		Total	
Club	Season	Division	Apps	Goals	Apps	Goals	Apps	Goals	Apps	Goals	Apps	Goals
Nice B	2020–21	CFA 2	1	0	—		—		—		1	0
Marseille B	2021–22	CFA	18	0	—		—		—		18	0
Marseille B	2022–23	CFA 2	19	3	—		—		—		19	3
Marseille B	2023–24	CFA 2	1	0	—		—		—		1	0
Marseille B	Total		38	3	—		—		—		38	3
Marseille	2023–24	Ligue 1	5	0	2	0	2 (Note: Appearances in UEFA Europa League.)	0	—		9	0
Marseille	2024–25	Ligue 1	15	1	1	0	—		—		16	1
Marseille	2025–26	Ligue 1	20	0	4	1	4 (Note: Appearances in UEFA Champions League)	0	—		28	1
Marseille	Total		40	1	7	1	6	0	—		53	2
Hamburger SV	2026–27	Bundesliga	4	0	1	0	—		—		5	0
Career total			83	4	8	1	6	0	0	0	97	5
