= Elliot Stroud =

Swedish footballer (born 2002)

- Stroud with Sweden in 2026

Personal information
- Full name: Elliot Karl Stroud
- Date of birth: 22 June 2002 (age 24)
- Place of birth: Uddevalla, Sweden
- Height: 1.85 m (6 ft 1 in)
- Positions: Left-back; left wing-back

Team information
- Current team: Hull City
- Number: 21

Youth career
- IK Oddevold

Senior career*
Years	Team	Apps	(Gls)
2019–2022	IK Oddevold	72	(16)
2023–2026	Mjällby AIF	87	(20)
2026–	Hull City	4	(0)

International career^{‡}
2026–	Sweden	8	(0)
- * Club domestic league appearances and goals as of 15:44, 22 August 2026 (UTC) ‡ National team caps and goals as of 23:45, 17 November 2026 (UTC)

Elliot Karl Stroud (born 22 June 2002) is a Swedish professional footballer who plays as a left-back or left wing-back for Premier League club Hull City and the Sweden national team.

== Club career ==
=== Early career ===
Stroud started his youth career in IK Oddevold, joining the senior team in 2019. The club then suffered relegation to Division 2, the fourth tier of Swedish football, but bounced back to compete in the 2022 Ettan. Expressen named Stroud as Oddevold's talent to watch out for in 2022. Aftonbladet included him on their top 30 list in the division, regardless of age.

=== Mjällby ===
Following a good season, Stroud had several offers from clubs higher in the division system. He chose Mjällby AIF and signed a contract until 2025. He made his Allsvenskan debut in April 2023 against Degerfors. He played a pivotal role in helping his club secure its first-ever titles in the 2025 Allsvenskan and 2025–26 Svenska Cupen.

=== Hull City ===
On 9 August 2026, Stroud signed a four-year contract with newly promoted Premier League side Hull City. He made his debut for the club on 22 August 2026, in a 2–0 home victory over Manchester United on the opening weekend of the 2026–27 Premier League season.

== International career ==
In March 2026, Stroud received his first call-up to the Sweden national team for the 2026 FIFA World Cup qualification second round games against Ukraine and Poland. On 12 May 2026, he was named in the Sweden squad for the 2026 FIFA World Cup. Stroud made his full international debut for Sweden on 4 June 2026 in a friendly 2–2 draw with Greece, replacing Gabriel Gudmundsson in the 66th minute.

== Personal life ==
Stroud's younger brother, Adam, is also a professional footballer. They are of English descent through their father. Stroud is a supporter of Manchester United.

== Career statistics ==
=== Club ===
As of match played 25 August 2026

Appearances and goals by club, season and competition
Club	Season	League			National cup (Note: Includes Svenska Cupen)		League cup		Europe		Total	
Club	Season	Division	Apps	Goals	Apps	Goals	Apps	Goals	Apps	Goals	Apps	Goals
IK Oddevold	2019	Division 1	9	0	0	0	—		—	—	9	0
IK Oddevold	2020	Division 2	11	3	0	0	—		—	—	11	3
IK Oddevold	2021	Division 2	24	7	2	1	—		—	—	26	8
IK Oddevold	2022	Division 1	28	6	0	0	—		—	—	28	6
IK Oddevold	Total		72	16	2	1	—		—	—	74	17
Mjällby AIF	2023	Allsvenskan	20	0	4	0	—		—	—	24	0
Mjällby AIF	2024	Allsvenskan	29	7	4	1	—		—	—	33	8
Mjällby AIF	2025	Allsvenskan	28	10	5	2	—		—	—	33	12
Mjällby AIF	2026	Allsvenskan	3	0	5	3	—				8	3
Mjällby AIF	Total		80	17	18	6	—				98	23
Hull City	2026–27	Premier League	1	0	0	0	1	0			2	0
Career total			153	33	20	7	1	0			174	40

=== International ===
As of match played 17 November 2026

Appearances and goals by national team and year
National team	Year	Apps	Goals
Sweden	2026	8	0
Total		8	0

== Honours ==
Mjällby IF

- Allsvenskan: 2025
- Svenska Cupen: 2025–26
