= Nobel Mendy =

Senegalese footballer (born 2004)

Personal information
- Date of birth: 16 August 2004 (age 22)
- Place of birth: Guédiawaye, Senegal
- Height: 1.87 m (6 ft 2 in)
- Positions: Centre-back; left-back

Team information
- Current team: Hull City
- Number: 32

Youth career
- Guédiawaye
- SPN Vernon
- Pacy Ménilles
- 2020–2021: Mantois 78
- 2021–2023: Paris FC

Senior career*
Years	Team	Apps	(Gls)
2022–2023	Paris FC II	20	(2)
2022–2024	Paris FC	3	(0)
2023–2024	→ Betis B (loan)	18	(0)
2024	→ Betis (loan)	0	(0)
2024–2025	Betis B	13	(0)
2024–2026	Betis	2	(0)
2025–2026	→ Rayo Vallecano (loan)	24	(2)
2026	Rayo Vallecano	0	(0)
2026–	Hull City	7	(1)

International career^{‡}
2026–	Senegal	2	(0)
- * Club domestic league appearances and goals as of 19:21, 22 August 2026 (UTC) ‡ National team caps and goals as of 4 October 2026

Nobel Mendy (born 16 August 2004) is a Senegalese professional footballer who plays as a centre-back or left-back for Premier League club Hull City and the Senegal national team.

== Club career ==
Born in Guédiawaye, Mendy began playing football with his local football academy Guédiawaye, before moving to France with his family in 2015, where he played for SPN Vernon, Pacy Ménilles and Mantois 78.

=== Paris FC ===
He signed a two-year contract with French side Paris FC in June 2021. He made his professional debut with Paris FC in a 1–0 Ligue 2 victory against Pau on 26 December 2022.

=== Betis ===
On 1 September 2023, Mendy moved on a loan to Betis Deportivo Balompié, the reserve team of Real Betis. He made his first team debut on 6 January 2024, starting in a 1–0 away loss to Deportivo Alavés in the Copa del Rey.

On 6 June 2024, Betis announced that they exercised Mendy's buyout clause, with the player signing a three-year contract. He made his La Liga debut on 18 May 2025, starting in a 4–1 loss at Atlético Madrid.

=== Rayo Vallecano ===
On 20 August 2025, Mendy was loaned to Rayo Vallecano also in the top tier, for one year. On 12 June of the following year, he signed a permanent four-year contract with the club.

=== Hull City ===
On 12 August 2026, Mendy signed for newly promoted Premier League club Hull City for an undisclosed club record fee on a five-year deal.

On 22 August 2026, Mendy made his debut and scored his first goal for the club, in a 2–0 home victory over Manchester United on the opening weekend of the season.

== Personal life ==
Besides the Senegalese passport, Mendy also holds a Guinea-Bissau passport, the latter due to his mother's origin. Mendy also holds a French passport.

== Career statistics ==
=== Club ===
As of match played 31 October 2026

Appearances and goals by club, season and competition
Club	Season	League			National cup (Note: Includes Copa del Rey)		League cup		Europe		Total	
Club	Season	Division	Apps	Goals	Apps	Goals	Apps	Goals	Apps	Goals	Apps	Goals
Paris FC B	2021–22	National 3	5	1	—		—		—		5	1
Paris FC B	2022–23	National 3	15	1	—		—		—		15	1
Paris FC B	Total		20	2	—		—		—		20	2
Paris FC	2022–23	Ligue 2	1	0	0	0	—		—		1	0
Paris FC	2023–24	Ligue 2	2	0	—		—		—		2	0
Paris FC	Total		3	0	0	0	—		—		3	0
Betis B (loan)	2023–24	Segunda Federación	21	0	—		—		—		21	0
Betis	2023–24	La Liga	0	0	1	0	—		0	0	1	0
Betis	2024–25	La Liga	2	0	1	0	—		2 (Note: Appearances in UEFA Conference League)	0	5	0
Betis	Total		2	0	2	0	—		2	0	6	0
Betis B	2024–25	Primera Federación	2	0	—		—		—		2	0
Rayo Vallecano (loan)	2025–26	La Liga	24	2	1	0	—		2	0	27	2
Hull City	2026–27	Premier League	6	1	0	0	1	0	—		7	1
Career total			77	5	3	0	0	0	4	0	84	5

=== International ===
As of match played 4 October 2026

Appearances and goals by national team and year
National team	Year	Apps	Goals
Senegal	2026	2	0
Total		2	0

== Honours ==
Betis

- UEFA Conference League runner-up: 2024–25

Rayo Vallecano

- UEFA Conference League runner-up: 2025–26
