= Mason Greenwood =

English footballer (born 2001)

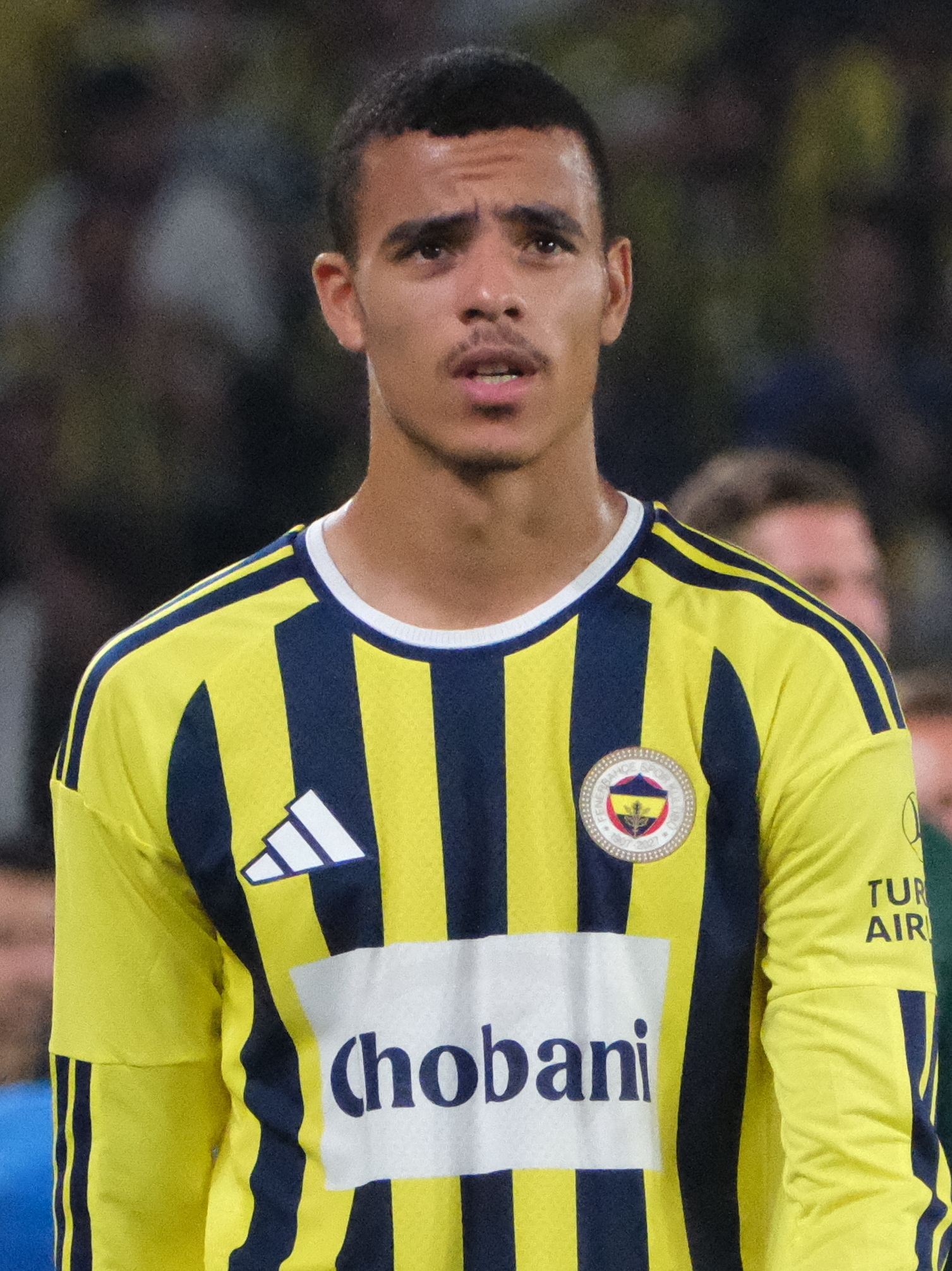
- Greenwood with Fenerbahçe in 2026

Personal information
- Full name: Mason Will John Greenwood
- Date of birth: 1 October 2001 (age 25)
- Place of birth: Bradford, England
- Height: 5 ft 11 in (1.81 m)
- Positions: Forward; right winger

Team information
- Current team: Fenerbahçe
- Number: 11

Youth career
- –2018: Manchester United

Senior career*
Years	Team	Apps	(Gls)
2018–2024	Manchester United	83	(22)
2023–2024	→ Getafe (loan)	33	(8)
2024–2026	Marseille	66	(37)
2026–	Fenerbahçe	11	(7)

International career
2015	England U15	1	(0)
2017–2018	England U17	6	(1)
2018	England U18	5	(1)
2019	England U21	4	(1)
2020	England	1	(0)
- * Club domestic league appearances and goals as of 20:45, 21 November 2026 (UTC)

Mason Will John Greenwood (born 1 October 2001) is an English professional footballer who plays as a forward for Süper Lig club Fenerbahçe.

A graduate of Manchester United's youth system, Greenwood scored in a UEFA Europa League match against Astana in September 2019, to become the club's youngest ever goalscorer in European competition at the age of 17 years, 353 days. His senior international debut for England came in September 2020, in a UEFA Nations League game against Iceland.

In October 2022, Greenwood was charged with attempted rape, assault occasioning actual bodily harm, and controlling and coercive behaviour. In February 2023, all charges against him were dropped after key witnesses declined to participate in the prosecution. In August 2023, Greenwood was loaned to Getafe for the 2023–24 La Liga season. In July 2024, he left Manchester United to join French club Marseille on a permanent deal. Greenwood was the joint top scorer of the 2024–25 Ligue 1 with 21 goals, and was named in the 2025–26 UNFP Team of the Season.

== Club career ==
=== Manchester United ===
==== Early career ====
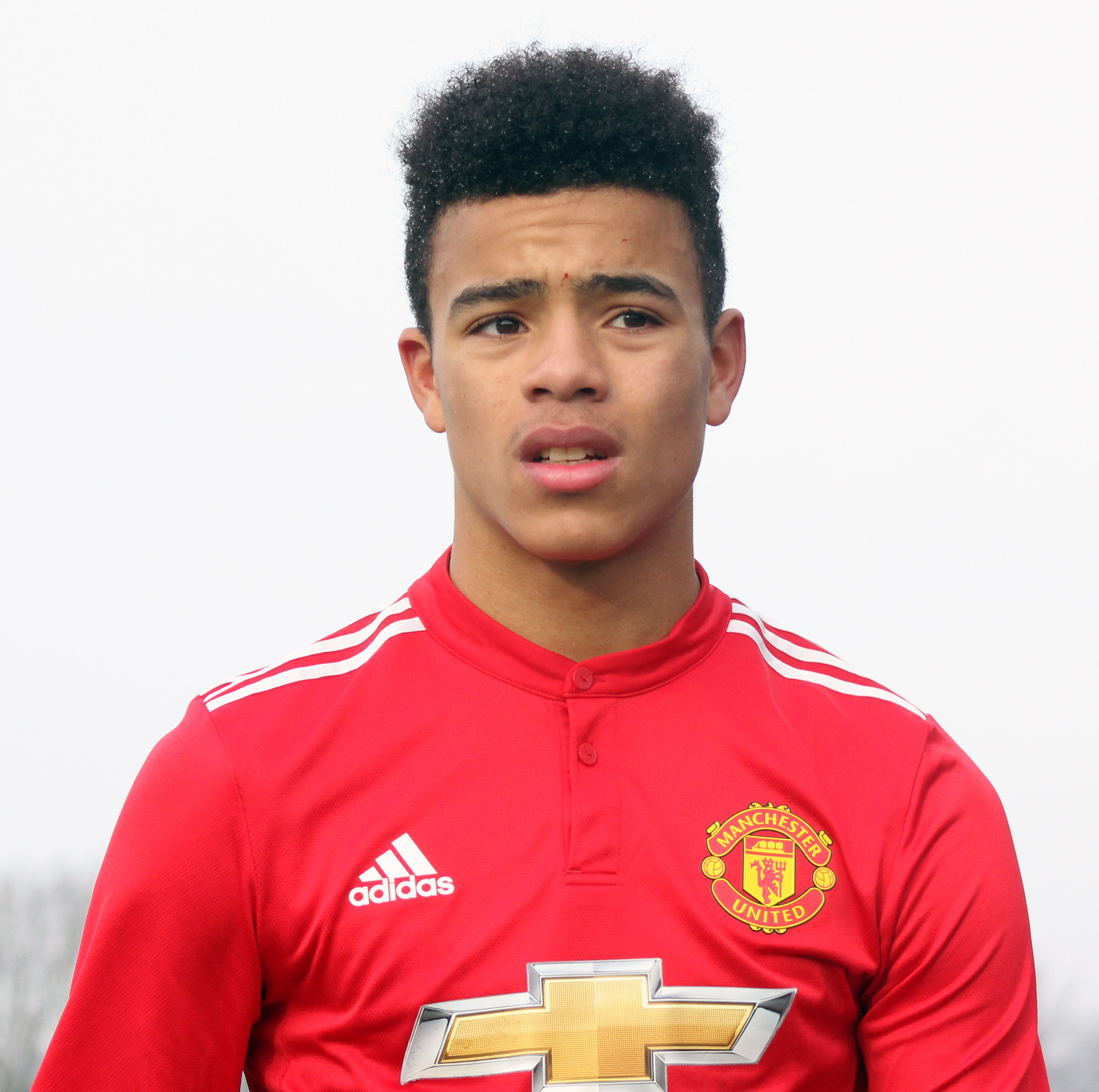
Greenwood in 2017

Greenwood joined Manchester United at the age of six, playing at the club's development school in Halifax. After progressing through the academy ranks, he joined up with the Under-18 squad for the 2017–18 season, despite being eligible for the Under-16s, and finished as top scorer of the U18 Premier League North with 17 goals in 21 games. In May 2018, Greenwood was named Player of the Tournament as the youth side won the ICGT Trophy, an international youth football tournament, in the Netherlands.

==== 2018–2021: First team breakthrough ====
In July 2018, Greenwood travelled with the first team on their pre-season tour of the United States. On 20 July, he made his non-competitive debut as a 76th-minute substitute in a 1–1 draw against Club América. On 2 October, Greenwood signed his first professional contract with the club. In December, he was selected by José Mourinho to train with the first team ahead of their UEFA Champions League match against Valencia.

On 6 March 2019, under the management of Ole Gunnar Solskjær, Greenwood made his competitive debut as an 87th-minute substitute in a 3–1 win against Paris Saint Germain in the Champions League. At the age of 17 years and 156 days, he became the second-youngest player to represent the club in a European competition (behind only Norman Whiteside) and the youngest ever in the Champions League era. Four days later, he made his Premier League debut from the bench in a 2–0 defeat to Arsenal to become one of the club's youngest league debutants.

Greenwood was named Premier League 2 Player of the Month for April 2019. At the end of the season, he received the Jimmy Murphy Young Player of the Year award, given each year to the best player in the club's youth teams. On 12 May, the final day of the season, Greenwood made his first senior start for the club in a 2–0 defeat to Cardiff City.

Greenwood's first United goal came in their Europa League opener against Kazakh side Astana on 19 September; scoring the only goal of the game to become the club's youngest ever goalscorer in European competition at the age of 17 years, 353 days. On 7 November, he scored in United's 3–0 win over Partizan Belgrade, qualifying them for the knockout stages of the competition. On 24 November, Greenwood scored his first league goal in a 3–3 draw with Sheffield United. On 12 December, he scored twice and won a penalty in the final game of the Europa League group stage against AZ Alkmaar. Manchester United won the game 4–0 and finished top of their group.

On 11 January 2020, after failing to score in three consecutive matches, Greenwood scored once in a 4–0 win over Norwich City. Fifteen days later, he scored his first FA Cup goal as United defeated Tranmere Rovers 6–0. Greenwood scored again four weeks later, in a 3–0 league win against Watford. On 12 March, he scored his fifth European goal during a 5–0 win over LASK of Austria; becoming the first teenager to score at least five goals in a single European season for United.

After a three-month suspension of football caused by the COVID-19 pandemic, Greenwood played in all six of United's matches as of 9 July 2020. He failed to score in the first three, but delivered a total of four goals in the next three, including a brace in a 5–2 win against Bournemouth on 4 July. After that, he scored against Aston Villa; making him only the fourth player aged below 19 to score in three consecutive Premier League appearances and the first since Francis Jeffers did so for Everton in 1999.

After wearing the number 26 for his breakout season in 2019, Greenwood was given the number 11 shirt by Manchester United on 4 September 2020. He joined a famous list of players to wear the number 11, most notably Ryan Giggs, a fellow academy product who retired in 2014 as the leading appearance maker for United with 963. On 22 September, Greenwood scored his first goal of the season in a 3–1 away victory over Luton Town in the third round of the EFL Cup, and on 28 October, he scored his first goal in the UEFA Champions League in a 5–0 win over RB Leipzig; the goal came from his first ever shot in the competition. He scored his first league goal of the season in a 3–1 away win against West Ham United on 5 December.

On 24 January 2021, Greenwood scored his first FA Cup goal of the season in a 3–2 home win against arch-rivals Liverpool in the fourth round. He played the full 90 minutes in the Premier League record-equalling 9–0 home win against Southampton on 2 February, and two weeks later he extended his contract to June 2025 with the option of a further year. He broke a four-month goal drought in the league on 4 April, scoring the winner against Brighton & Hove Albion which ended 2–1 at home. Greenwood excelled in April with four league goals in four matches, including a brace against Burnley. This earnt him his first nomination for the Premier League Player of the Month, which was won by teammate Jesse Lingard, who was on loan at West Ham. On 29 April, Greenwood scored his first goal in the UEFA Europa League for the season against Roma during the first leg of the semi-finals in a 6–2 home victory.

On 9 May, Greenwood scored another goal against Aston Villa in a 3–1 away win. Two days later, Greenwood scored against Leicester City, assisted by Amad Diallo, in a 2–1 defeat; the goal was the first time in 15 years a teenager assisted another for a Premier League goal. On 26 May, Greenwood played in his first cup final, in the 2021 Europa League against Villarreal at the Stadion Gdańsk. He played 100 minutes before being substituted in the first period of extra time for Fred; the match ended 1–1 and the Spanish club won 12–11 on penalties.

==== 2021–2023: Final season and suspension ====
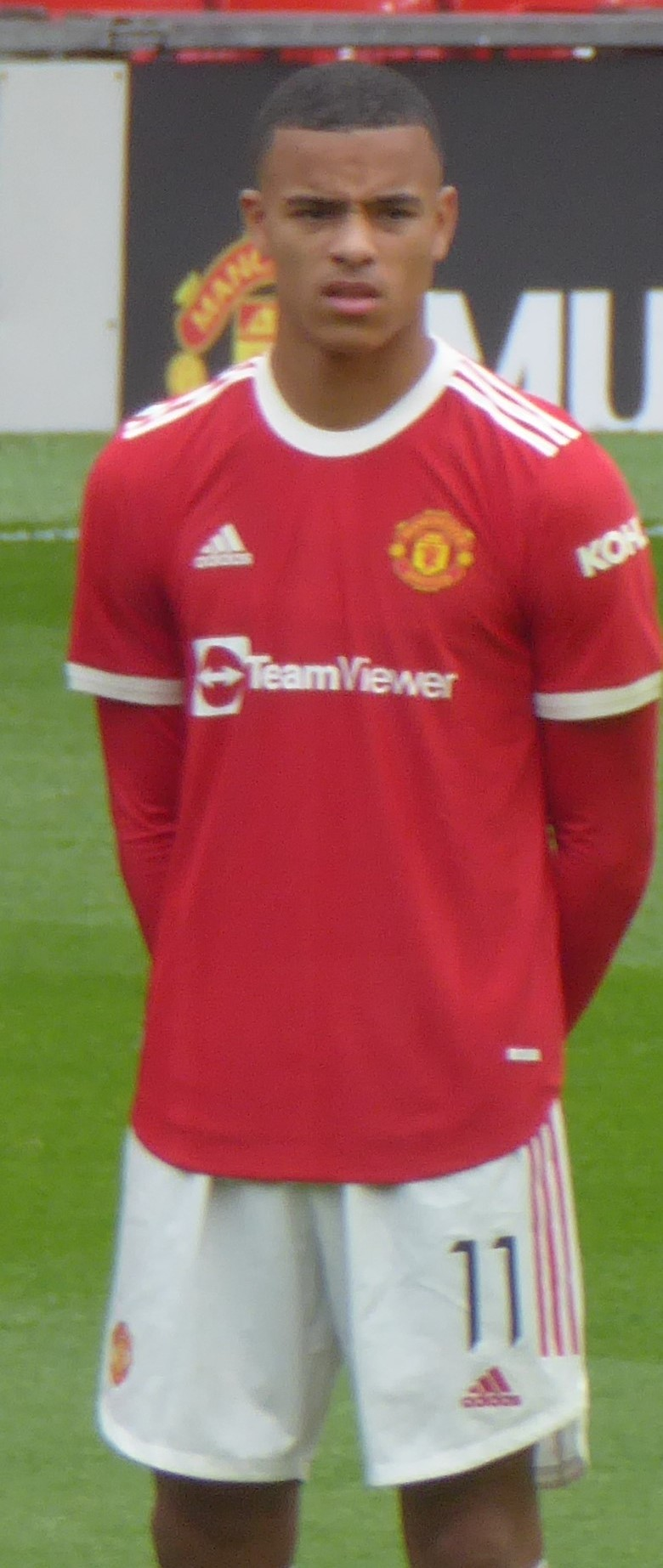
Greenwood playing for Manchester United in 2021

On 14 August 2021, Greenwood scored his first goal of the season in a 5–1 win over Leeds in Manchester United's opening match of the 2021–22 Premier League season. Fifteen days later, he scored the goal that secured a 1–0 win over Wolverhampton Wanderers, becoming the second teenager in Premier League history after Robbie Fowler to score in each of his team's first three games of a season, and helped United breaking the record of most consecutive away matches undefeated in English football history with 28.

Greenwood had scored 32 career goals for United by the time he turned 20 in October, with only Norman Whiteside (39) and George Best (37) scoring more goals for the club as a teenager. He was one of 10 players nominated for the Kopa Trophy in 2021. In November, it was announced that he had finished fifth, behind Pedri, Jude Bellingham, Jamal Musiala and Nuno Mendes. On 8 December, Greenwood scored his first goal in the 2021–22 Champions League, against Young Boys in a 1–1 draw in interim manager Ralf Rangnick's first Champions League game with the club.

On 30 January 2022, Greenwood was suspended by United after being arrested on suspicion of rape. After the criminal charges against Greenwood were dropped in February 2023 due to "the withdrawal of key witnesses and new material that came to light", United began their own investigation into the events that caused his initial 2022 arrest. According to reporting by ESPN, United did not have all the evidence gathered by prosecutors, instead requiring the cooperation of the involved parties to provide evidence; the alleged victim never engaged directly with United for the investigation, but the alleged victim's mother did engage with United. Greenwood gave United explanations regarding the publicly released audio and images, which the alleged victim's family did not contest; ultimately the club's investigation decided that Greenwood had not committed the initial offences and that there were no grounds to terminate his contract, reported ESPN. According to initial reporting by journalist Adam Crafton of The Athletic, as well as subsequent reporting by The Daily Telegraph, Manchester United CEO Richard Arnold told the club's top executives in early August 2023 of intentions to reintegrate Greenwood into playing for United.

On 16 August 2023, Manchester United publicly announced that the club was in its "final stages" of considering Greenwood's future at the club, after having completed an investigation into the allegations that caused his 2022 arrest. United said that their investigation "has drawn on extensive evidence and context not in the public domain", and also stressed that the club has "responsibilities to Mason as an employee, as a young person who has been with the club since the age of seven, and as a new father with a partner."

According to reporting by The Daily Telegraph, the above statement generated objections to Greenwood's return from both United's staff and the public. Among those who publicly criticised the club's handling of Greenwood's case were domestic violence charity Women's Aid and Stretford and Urmston MP Andrew Western. Given the backlash, the club's top executives changed their minds by 18 August, deciding that Greenwood should not return, reported The Daily Telegraph.

On 21 August 2023, United announced that Greenwood would be leaving the club, stating that "we will now work with Mason to achieve that outcome". According to United, the investigation result was that "the material posted online did not provide a full picture and that Mason did not commit the offences in respect of which he was originally charged", but Greenwood "made mistakes which he is taking responsibility for" and there are "difficulties with him recommencing his career" with United. On the same day, Greenwood made a statement acknowledging that he would leave United; stating: "I was brought up to know that violence or abuse in any relationship is wrong, I did not do the things I was accused of [...] I fully accept I made mistakes in my relationship, and I take my share of responsibility for the situations which led to the social media post." BBC News reported that Greenwood could be sold or loaned to another club, with his United contract being until 2025.

==== 2023–2024: Loan to Getafe ====
On 1 September 2023, Greenwood joined La Liga club Getafe on loan for the 2023–24 season. He made his debut in a 3–2 league win over Osasuna on 17 September, as a substitute for the final 15 minutes.

In his fifth game, on 8 October 2023, Greenwood scored his first Getafe goal in a 2–2 draw at Celta Vigo; it was his first goal since January 2022. On 1 November, in the first round of the Copa del Rey, he scored twice in a 12–0 win at sixth-tier Tardienta. Greenwood was sent off on 2 January 2024 in a 2–0 home loss to fellow Community of Madrid side Rayo Vallecano, for swearing at the referee in English. He finished his season with 33 league games, scoring 8 goals and assisting 6.

=== Marseille ===
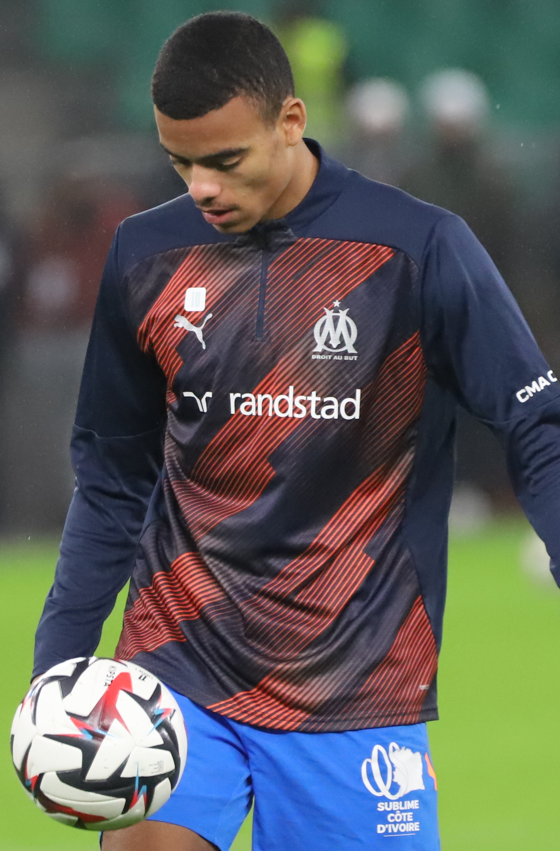
Greenwood with Marseille in 2024

==== 2024–2025 ====
On 18 July 2024, Greenwood joined Ligue 1 club Marseille on a five-year contract in a deal worth up to €31.6 million. The mayor of Marseille, Benoît Payan, criticised the move as "a disgrace".

On his debut on 17 August, Greenwood scored two goals, assisted two others and won a penalty in a 5–1 win at Brest. Two weeks later, he scored twice in the space of a minute in a 3–1 victory away to Toulouse to reach five goals in his first three games, matching Mario Balotelli's 2016 record for Nice.

Greenwood contributed greatly to OM second place in Ligue 1 and subsequent Champions League qualification, totalling 21 league goals and 6 assists in his first season at the club. He finished level with Ousmane Dembélé of PSG as the season's top scorer.

==== 2025–2026 ====
On 18 October 2025, Greenwood scored four times in a 6–2 home win over Le Havre to put Marseille above PSG on top of the table. He became the first Marseille player to score four times in a game since Jean-Pierre Papin in 1991.

He was chosen Player of the month by the supporters for the month of December, notably scoring two goals against Union Saint-Gilloise in the Champions League league phase.

Tallying 26 goals and 11 assists across all competitions, Greenwood was subsequently named in the UNFP Team of the Season and chosen Player of the season by OM fans.

=== Fenerbahçe ===
Greenwood with Fenerbahçe in 2026

On 14 July 2026, Greenwood signed for Fenerbahçe on a four-year contract. The transfer fee was reported to be €39 million, with the deal potentially reaching €45 million.

On 21 July 2026, he made his debut with the team in a 2026–27 UEFA Champions League second qualifying round match, 1–0 home win against Górnik Zabrze. On 5 August 2026, he scored his first goal for the team, when he played first time as a starter, in a 2–0 win against Sturm Graz in the 2026–27 UEFA Champions League third qualifying round.

On 22 August 2026, he scored a brace and made an assist against Konyaspor in a 4-2 Süper Lig home win. On 8 November 2026, he scored a brace and made and assist again, in a 8-0 Süper Lig home victory against Eyüpspor.

On 4 November 2026, he scored a goal that helped his team secure a 3–2 victory over Liverpool, in the 2026–27 UEFA Champions League match played at Chobani Stadium.

On 8 November 2026, he scored a brace, third time in this season, against Çorum F.K. in a 5-0 Süper Lig away victory.

== International career ==
Greenwood is eligible to represent England or Jamaica at international level.

=== England youth level ===
Greenwood played youth international football for England's under-15, under-17, under-18 and under-21 teams. He made six appearances for the England under-17 team between 2017 and 2018, and was part of the under-17 squad at the Algarve Tournament in Portugal. He scored one goal in five appearances for the England under-18 team, all in 2018.

On 30 August 2019, Greenwood was included in the England under-21 squad for the first time and made his debut as a 59th-minute substitute during the 3–2 win against Turkey on 6 September in qualifying for the 2021 European Under-21 Championship. He scored his first goal for the team on 19 November; equalising against the Netherlands in a match which England ultimately lost 2–1. Greenwood played four games in total at under-21 level, scoring once.

=== England senior level ===
Greenwood was named in the England senior squad for the first time on 25 August 2020. He made his debut on 5 September in a 1–0 away win over Iceland in a 2020–21 UEFA Nations League A match, coming on as a 78th-minute substitute. On 7 September, he and Phil Foden were withdrawn from the England squad after breaking COVID-19 quarantine guidelines in Iceland by leaving the part of the hotel that the squad was occupying; media reports alleged that the players had met two women in another part of the hotel.

Greenwood was not selected for the September 2021 World Cup qualifiers by England manager Gareth Southgate who stated, "He is in our thoughts, I've spoken with him and his club, he is a player we really like. We are all very conscious that he makes the progression at the right time."

More recently in September 2025, after picking up form for French club Marseille, Greenwood kept his hopes of being called up to the England first team for the first time since November 2021, England manager Thomas Tuchel confirmed he will not be considered, leaving Greenwood to be left out of the 2026 FIFA World Cup.

=== Request to switch national teams ===
In August 2024, it was announced that Greenwood had filed papers to request to be able to switch his international eligibility to Jamaica. The FA confirmed in March 2025 that Greenwood had made the switch. In early 2025, newly appointed manager of England senior team Thomas Tuchel informed Greenwood he would not be part of his plans. English Football Association chief executive Mark Bullingham also confirmed that Greenwood had asked to switch allegiances to Jamaica.

Jamaica Football Federation (JFF) President Michael Ricketts said Greenwood, who is eligible to represent Jamaica through his mother, officially received his Jamaican passport, ending the year-long paperwork process. He only needed to receive an international transfer certificate clearance from the English Football Association (FA). Greenwood was expected to be available for 2026 FIFA World Cup qualification (CONCACAF) against Bermuda and Trinidad and Tobago in September. Ricketts hoped by now the coach Steve McClaren would have had some discussions with him.

== Style of play ==
Greenwood began his career as a midfielder but gradually evolved into a centre forward. He often played on the right flank for Manchester United, as well as moving more centrally to occupy as a second striker when the ball is fed into the penalty area. During his early career, several of his goals saw him dropping a shoulder or chopping the ball to get it on to his left foot before scoring. He also often reverses his shot by aiming low for the near post from the right of the box.

In May 2018, former Manchester United player Clayton Blackmore said: "He's great on the ball and very good with both feet. He's the first person I've seen that takes penalties and free-kicks with his wrong foot. I've never come across anyone like that!" In March 2019, former academy coach Mark Senior said: "People says he's like the new Robin van Persie but I don't know. I think he's his own man. I've not seen another player like him. His style means his pace is deceptive because he is absolutely rapid."

In July 2019, Manchester United manager Ole Gunnar Solskjær praised Greenwood during their pre-season tour, saying: "He can play all of the front-three positions, or across the front four, as he can play number 10, number seven, number 11 and number nine. He's a natural footballer with his left foot, coming in, but he's got two feet and can play anywhere along the front. He's just a natural. When he takes a penalty with his right, then takes a penalty with his left, free-kicks with his left, free-kicks with his right. He is almost what you'd call 50:50, maybe 51:49 left-footed."

== Personal life ==
Greenwood was born in Bradford, West Yorkshire, and raised in the Wibsey area of the city. He is of Jamaican descent. His family has a background in sports; his sister, Ashton, is a track athlete. In July 2023, Greenwood indicated that he had become a father by having a child with his girlfriend.

=== 2022 arrests ===
On 30 January 2022, Greenwood was accused of assault by his girlfriend in a series of posts on her social media. The posts included images and video of apparent injuries, as well as audio where a woman tells a man whom she called Mason: "I don't want to have sex", to which the man replies: "I don't give a fuck what you want ... I'm going to fuck you, you twat ... I don't care if you want to have sex with me ... I asked you politely, and you wouldn't do it, so what else do you want me to do?" The man later says: "Push me again one more time and watch what happens to you."

Later on 30 January, Greenwood was suspended by Manchester United, and arrested by Greater Manchester Police on suspicion of rape and assault of a woman. On 1 February, Greenwood was further arrested on suspicion of sexual assault and threats to kill. By then, sports apparel company Nike had said that it suspended its relationship with Greenwood, and video game company EA Sports had said it removed Greenwood from its FIFA games.

On 2 February, Greenwood was released on bail pending further investigation. Within a week, Nike stopped sponsoring Greenwood. In April 2022, his bail was extended to mid-June. According to Manchester United's CEO Richard Arnold in August 2023, the "alleged victim requested the police to drop their investigation in April 2022".

On 15 October 2022, Greenwood was arrested for allegedly breaching his bail conditions by contacting his accuser. The same day, he was charged with attempted rape for an alleged incident on 22 October 2021, assault occasioning actual bodily harm for an alleged incident in December 2021, and engaging in controlling and coercive behaviour from November 2018. On 17 October 2022, he was initially remanded into custody until 21 November; by 19 October, after a private hearing at Minshull Street Crown Court, he was granted bail with conditions not to contact witnesses, including the complainant, and to reside at an address in Bowdon. On 2 February 2023, the Crown Prosecution Service dropped all charges against Greenwood, citing the withdrawal of key witnesses and "new material that came to light".

== Career statistics ==
=== Club ===
As of match played 21 November 2026

Appearances and goals by club, season and competition
Club	Season	League			National cup (Note: Includes FA Cup, Copa del Rey, Coupe de France, Turkish Cup)		League cup (Note: Includes EFL Cup)		Europe		Other		Total	
Club	Season	Division	Apps	Goals	Apps	Goals	Apps	Goals	Apps	Goals	Apps	Goals	Apps	Goals
Manchester United	2018–19	Premier League	3	0	0	0	0	0	1 (Note: Appearance(s) in UEFA Champions League)	0	—		4	0
Manchester United	2019–20	Premier League	31	10	5	1	4	1	9 (Note: Appearances in UEFA Europa League)	5	—		49	17
Manchester United	2020–21	Premier League	31	7	4	2	3	1	14 (Note: Five appearances and one goal in UEFA Champions League, nine appearances and one goal in UEFA Europa League)	2	—		52	12
Manchester United	2021–22	Premier League	18	5	1	0	1	0	4	1	—		24	6
Manchester United	2022–23	Premier League	0	0	0	0	0	0	0	0	—		0	0
Manchester United	Total		83	22	10	3	8	2	28	8	—		129	35
Manchester United U21	2019–20	—			—		—		—		1 (Note: Appearance in EFL Trophy)	1	1	1
Getafe (loan)	2023–24	La Liga	33	8	3	2	—		—		—		36	10
Marseille	2024–25	Ligue 1	34	21	2	1	—		—		—		36	22
Marseille	2025–26	Ligue 1	32	16	4	6	—		8	3	1 (Note: Appearance in Trophée des Champions)	1	45	26
Marseille	Total		66	37	6	7	—		8	3	1	1	81	48
Fenerbahçe	2026–27	Süper Lig	11	7	0	0	—		10	4	0	0	21	11
Career total			193	74	19	12	8	2	46	15	2	2	268	105

=== International ===
Appearances and goals by national team and year
National team	Year	Apps	Goals
England	2020	1	0
Total		1	0

== Honours ==
Manchester United

- UEFA Europa League runner-up: 2020–21

Individual

- Premier League 2 Player of the Month: April 2019
- Jimmy Murphy Young Player of the Year: 2018–19
- IFFHS Men's Youth (U20) World Team: 2021
- Getafe Player of the Season: 2023–24
- UNFP Ligue 1 Player of the Month: December 2024, April 2025, October 2025
- Ligue 1 top scorer: 2024–25 (joint)
- UNFP Ligue 1 Team of the Season: 2025–26
- Marseille Player of the Season: 2025–26
