= Ange Lago =

Ivorian footballer (born 2004)

Personal information
- Full name: Emmanuel Israel Ange Lago
- Date of birth: 27 December 2004 (age 21)
- Place of birth: Yassap, Ivory Coast
- Height: 1.83 m (6 ft 0 in)
- Position: Forward

Team information
- Current team: Dijon
- Number: 90

Youth career
- 2021–2023: Reference FA

Senior career*
Years	Team	Apps	(Gls)
2023–2026	Marseille II	60	(15)
2026	Marseille	2	(0)
2026–	Dijon	1	(0)
- * Club domestic league appearances and goals as of 4 September 2026

Emmanuel Israel Ange Lago (born 27 December 2004) is an Ivorian professional footballer who plays as a forward for Ligue 2 club Dijon.

== Club career ==
A youth product of the Ivorian club Reference FA, Lago joined Marseille on 18 January 2023 and was originally assigned to their reserves. After a strong season in the Championnat National 3, he started training with the Marseille senior team in March 2026. He made his senior and professional debut with Marseille in a 3–0 loss to Nantes on 2 May 2026.

On 29 August 2026, Lago signed a three-year contract with Ligue 2 club Dijon.

== Career statistics ==
As of match played 10 May 2026

Appearances and goals by club, season and competition
Club	Season	League			Cup		Europe		Other		Total	
Club	Season	Division	Apps	Goals	Apps	Goals	Apps	Goals	Apps	Goals	Apps	Goals
Marseille II	2022–23	National 3	7	0	—		—		—		7	0
Marseille II	2023–24	National 3	18	1	—		—		—		18	1
Marseille II	2024–25	National 3	15	6	—		—		—		15	6
Marseille II	2025–26	National 3	20	8	—		—		—		20	8
Marseille II	Total		60	15	—		—		—		60	15
Marseille	2025–26	Ligue 1	2	0	0	0	0	0	0	0	2	0
Career total			62	15	0	0	0	0	0	0	62	15
