= Lucas Gourna-Douath =

French footballer (born 2003)

- Gourna-Douath with Red Bull Salzburg in 2024

Personal information
- Date of birth: 5 August 2003 (age 23)
- Place of birth: Villeneuve-Saint-Georges, France
- Height: 1.85 m (6 ft 1 in)
- Position: Defensive midfielder

Team information
- Current team: Hull City
- Number: 29

Youth career
- 2009–2012: Lieusaint
- 2012–2017: Sénart-Moissy
- 2017–2018: Torcy
- 2018–2020: Saint-Étienne

Senior career*
Years	Team	Apps	(Gls)
2019–2020	Saint-Étienne B	6	(0)
2020–2022	Saint-Étienne	61	(1)
2022–2026	Red Bull Salzburg	64	(0)
2022	→ FC Liefering (loan)	1	(0)
2025	→ Roma (loan)	6	(0)
2026	→ Le Havre (loan)	15	(0)
2026–	Hull City	3	(0)

International career^{‡}
2018–2019	France U16	11	(0)
2019–2020	France U17	4	(1)
2021–2022	France U19	10	(0)
2022–2023	France U20	2	(0)
2023	France U21	3	(0)
- * Club domestic league appearances and goals as of 23:53, 19 September 2026 (UTC) ‡ National team caps and goals as of 20 November 2023

Lucas Gourna-Douath (born 5 August 2003) is a French professional footballer who plays as a defensive midfielder for Premier League club Hull City.

== Club career ==
=== Saint-Étienne ===
On 6 May 2020, Gourna-Douath signed his first professional contract with Saint-Étienne at the age of 16. He made his professional debut in a 2–0 Ligue 1 win over Strasbourg on 12 September 2020.

=== Red Bull Salzburg ===
On 13 July 2022, Austrian club Red Bull Salzburg announced the signing of Gourna-Douath on a five-year contract. The transfer fee paid to Saint-Étienne was a reported €15 million, making him the most expensive signing in the history of Austrian football.

==== Loan to Roma ====
On 3 February 2025, Gourna-Douath joined Serie A club Roma on a loan deal until the end of the 2024–25 season, with an option of a permanent move.

==== Loan to Le Havre ====
On 16 January 2026, Gourna-Douath returned to France and signed with Le Havre on loan.

=== Hull City ===
On 15 August 2026, Gourna-Douath signed a five-year contract with newly English Premier League promoted club Hull City, ahead of the 2026–27 season.

== International career ==
Gourna-Douath was born in France and is of Central African Republic descent. He is a youth international for France.

== Career statistics ==
As of match played 19 September 2026

Appearances and goals by club, season and competition
Club	Season	League			National cup (Note: Includes Coupe de France, Austrian Cup)		League cup (Note: Includes EFL Cup)		Europe		Other		Total	
Club	Season	Division	Apps	Goals	Apps	Goals	Apps	Goals	Apps	Goals	Apps	Goals	Apps	Goals
Saint-Étienne B	2019–20	Championnat National 2	6	0	—		—		—		—		6	0
Saint-Étienne	2020–21	Ligue 1	30	0	3	0	—		—		—		33	0
Saint-Étienne	2021–22	Ligue 1	31	1	0	0	—		—		1 (Note: Appearance in Ligue 1 relegation play-offs)	0	32	1
Saint-Étienne	Total		61	1	3	0	—		—		1	0	65	1
Red Bull Salzburg	2022–23	Austrian Bundesliga	21	0	3	0	—		8 (Note: Six appearances in UEFA Champions League, two appearances in UEFA Europa League)	0	—		32	0
Red Bull Salzburg	2023–24	Austrian Bundesliga	28	0	2	1	—		5 (Note: Appearances in UEFA Champions League)	0	—		35	1
Red Bull Salzburg	2024–25	Austrian Bundesliga	12	0	2	1	—		10	0	0	0	24	1
Red Bull Salzburg	2025–26	Austrian Bundesliga	4	0	0	0	—		1 (Note: Appearance in UEFA Europa League)	0	—		5	0
Red Bull Salzburg	Total		65	0	7	2	—		24	0	0	0	96	2
FC Liefering (loan)	2022–23	Austrian Second League	1	0	—		—		—		—		1	0
Roma (loan)	2024–25	Serie A	6	0	0	0	—		0	0	—		6	0
Le Havre (loan)	2025–26	Ligue 1	15	0	—		—		—		—		15	0
Hull City	2026–27	Premier League	3	0	0	0	2	0	—		—		5	0
Career total			157	1	10	2	2	0	24	0	1	0	194	3
