= Robinio Vaz =

French footballer (born 2007)

- Vaz in 2026

Personal information
- Date of birth: 17 February 2007 (age 19)
- Place of birth: Mantes-la-Jolie, France
- Height: 1.85 m (6 ft 1 in)
- Position: Striker

Team information
- Current team: Hull City (on loan from Roma)
- Number: 47

Youth career
- 2015–2017: Mantes
- 2017–2022: FC Mantois 78
- 2022–2023: Sochaux

Senior career*
Years	Team	Apps	(Gls)
2023–2024	Sochaux B	5	(0)
2024–2025	Marseille B	8	(6)
2025–2026	Marseille	16	(4)
2026–	Roma	12	(1)
2026–	→ Hull City (loan)	4	(0)

International career^{‡}
2023	France U16	6	(2)
2023	France U17	2	(0)
2025	France U18	4	(2)
2025–	France U20	1	(0)
- * Club domestic league appearances and goals as of 17 October 2026 ‡ National team caps and goals as of 7 September 2025

Robinio Vaz (born 17 February 2007) is a French professional footballer who plays as a striker for Premier League club Hull City, on loan from Serie A club Roma.

== Early life ==
Vaz was born on 17 February 2007 in Mantes-la-Jolie, a commune in Yvelines, France, to Muslim immigrants from Guinea-Bissau and Senegal.

== Career ==
As a youth player, Vaz joined the youth academy of USC Mantes. In 2017, he joined the youth academy of FC Mantois 78. Five years later, he joined the youth academy of FC Sochaux-Montbéliard and played for the club's reserve team. Subsequently, he signed for Ligue 1 side Marseille. On 14 January 2025, he debuted for the club during a 1–1 home loss on penalties to Lille in the Coupe de France. Later that year, on 23 August, he scored his first goal in a 5–2 victory over Paris FC.

On 14 January 2026, Vaz moved to Italy, joining Serie A club Roma, signing a four-year contract for a fee reported to be around €25 million. He made his debut for the club on 18 January, coming off the bench in a 2–0 win against Torino.

On 1 September 2026, Vaz joined newly promoted Premier League side Hull City on loan.

== Style of play ==
Vaz plays as a striker. Right-footed, he is known for his speed and strength.

== Career statistics ==
As of match played 17 October 2026

Appearances and goals by club, season and competition
Club	Season	League			National cup (Note: Includes Coupe de France)		League cup (Note: Includes EFL Cup)		Europe		Other		Total	
Club	Season	Division	Apps	Goals	Apps	Goals	Apps	Goals	Apps	Goals	Apps	Goals	Apps	Goals
Sochaux B	2023–24	National 3	5	0	—		—		—		—		5	0
Marseille B	2024–25	National 3	8	6	—		—		—		—		8	6
Marseille	2024–25	Ligue 1	2	0	1	0	—		—		—		3	0
Marseille	2025–26	Ligue 1	14	4	1	0	—		4 (Note: Appearances in UEFA Champions League)	0	0	0	19	4
Marseille	Total		16	4	2	0	—		4	0	0	0	22	4
Roma	2025–26	Serie A	12	1	—		—		2 (Note: Appearances in UEFA Europa League)	0	—		14	1
Hull City (loan)	2026–27	Premier League	4	0	0	0	1	0	—		—		5	0
Career total			45	11	2	0	1	0	6	0	0	0	54	11
