= 2026–27 Hull City A.F.C. season =

Hull City
2026–27 season
- Owner: Acun Medya
- Chairman: Acun Ilıcalı
- Head coach: Sergej Jakirović
- Stadium: MKM Stadium
- Premier League: 13th
- FA Cup: Third round
- EFL Cup: Third round
- Top goalscorer: League: Oli McBurnie (4); All: Oli McBurnie (4)
- Highest home attendance: 24,470 (v Manchester United, 22 August, Premier League)
- Lowest home attendance: 24,259 (v Brentford, 25 October, Premier League)
- Average home league attendance: 24,414
Home colours	Away colours	Third colours
- All statistics correct as of 7 November 2026.

The 2026–27 season is the 123rd season in the history of Hull City Association Football Club, and their first season back in the Premier League since the 2016–17 campaign, following their promotion via the 2026 EFL play-offs. In addition to the domestic league, the club is also participating in the FA Cup and the EFL Cup.

== Coaching staff ==
Position	Name
Head Coach	(Bosnia and Herzegovina) Sergej Jakirović
Assistant Head Coach	(England) Dean Holden
Assistant Head Coach	(Croatia) Marko Salatović
Fitness Coach	(Croatia) Marin Ivančić
Goalkeeping Coach	(England) Erbil Bozkurt
Head of Analysis	(Croatia) Anđelo Roguljić
Head of Player Development	(England) Andy Dawson

Source: Hull City A.F.C.

== Squad ==
No.	Player	Position	Nationality	Place of birth	Date of birth (age) (Note: Players' ages listed as they were on 1 July 2026, the official start date of the 2026–27 season)	Previous club	Date signed	Fee (Note: All fees converted into GBP)	Contract end
Goalkeepers
1	Jack Butland	GK	(England)	Bristol	10 March 1993 (age 33)	(Scotland) Rangers	2 July 2026	£3,000,000	30 June 2028
12	Dillon Phillips	GK	(England)	Hornchurch	11 June 1995 (age 31)	Rotherham United	1 July 2025	Free	30 June 2027
19	Konstantinos Tzolakis	GK	(Greece)	Chania	8 November 2002 (age 24)	(Greece) Olympiacos	5 August 2026	£20,000,000	30 June 2031
Defenders
2	Lewie Coyle (c)	RB	(England)	Hull	15 October 1995 (age 31)	Fleetwood Town	7 August 2020	£350,000	30 June 2029
3	Ryan Giles	LB	(England)	Telford	26 January 2000 (age 26)	Luton Town	27 June 2024	£4,000,000	30 June 2027
4	Charlie Hughes (vc)	CB	(England)	Golborne	16 October 2003 (age 23)	Wigan Athletic	16 August 2024	£3,500,000	30 June 2028
6	Semi Ajayi	CB	(Nigeria)	(England) Crayford	9 November 1993 (age 33)	West Bromwich Albion	1 July 2025	Free	30 June 2027
15	John Egan	CB	(Republic of Ireland)	Cork	20 October 1992 (age 33)	Burnley	3 February 2025	£250,000	30 June 2027
17	Paddy McNair	CB	(Northern Ireland)	Ballyclare	27 April 1995 (age 31)	(United States) San Diego FC	28 January 2026	Free	30 June 2027
18	Brooke Norton-Cuffy	RB	(England)	Pimlico	12 January 2004 (age 22)	(Italy) Genoa	1 September 2026	£12,000,000	30 June 2031
22	Lucas Herrington	CB	(Australia)	Brisbane	5 September 2007 (age 18)	(United States) Colorado Rapids	12 August 2026	£17,000,000	30 June 2031
23	Matt Targett	LB	(England)	Eastleigh	18 September 1995 (age 30)	Newcastle United	23 July 2026	Free	30 June 2028
32	Nobel Mendy	CB	(Senegal)	Guédiawaye	16 August 2004 (age 21)	(Spain) Rayo Vallecano	12 August 2026	£22,000,000	30 June 2031
Midfielders
5	Hidemasa Morita	CM	(Japan)	Takatsuki	10 May 1995 (age 31)	(Portugal) Sporting CP	24 July 2026	Free	30 June 2028
8	Eliot Matazo	DM	(Belgium)	Woluwe-Saint-Lambert	15 February 2002 (age 24)	(France) Monaco	24 January 2025	£1,800,000	30 June 2028
11	Joe Gelhardt	AM	(England)	Liverpool	4 May 2002 (age 24)	Leeds United	15 August 2026	£6,500,000	30 June 2030
14	Jens Hjertø-Dahl	CM	(Norway)	Tromsø	31 October 2005 (age 20)	(Norway) Tromsø	7 August 2026	£8,000,000	30 June 2031
20	Óscar Zambrano	DM	(Ecuador)	Santo Domingo	20 April 2004 (age 22)	(Slovenia) Maribor	21 July 2026	£3,500,000	30 June 2030
24	Darko Gyabi	CM	(England)	Catford	18 February 2004 (age 22)	Leeds United	1 September 2025	Free	30 June 2028
25	Matt Crooks	CM	(England)	Leeds	20 January 1994 (age 32)	(United States) Real Salt Lake	10 January 2025	£1,500,000	30 June 2027
26	Kieran Dowell	CM	(England)	Ormskirk	10 October 1997 (age 28)	(Scotland) Rangers	23 January 2026	Free	30 June 2027
27	Regan Slater	CM	(England)	Gleadless	11 September 1999 (age 26)	Sheffield United	27 January 2022	£50,000	30 June 2027
29	Lucas Gourna-Douath	DM	(France)	Villeneuve-Saint-Georges	5 August 2003 (age 22)	(Austria) Red Bull Salzburg	15 August 2026	£3,000,000	30 June 2031
33	Abdülkadir Ömür	AM	(Turkey)	Trabzon	25 June 1999 (age 27)	(Turkey) Trabzonspor	1 February 2024	£2,000,000	30 June 2027
36	Christos Mouzakitis	CM	(Greece)	Athens	25 December 2006 (age 19)	(Greece) Olympiacos	1 September 2026	£12,800,000	30 June 2031
42	Tim Iroegbunam	CM	(England)	Great Barr	30 June 2003 (age 23)	Everton	1 September 2026	£13,000,000	30 June 2031
Forwards
7	Sorba Thomas	RW	(Wales)	(England) Barking	15 January 1999 (age 27)	Stoke City	1 September 2026	£7,500,000	30 June 2030
9	Oli McBurnie	CF	(Scotland)	(England) Leeds	4 June 1996 (age 30)	(Spain) Las Palmas	6 August 2025	Free	30 June 2028
10	Mohamed Belloumi	RW	(Algeria)	Mascara	1 June 2002 (age 24)	(Portugal) Farense	30 August 2024	£4,200,000	30 June 2028
21	Elliot Stroud	LW	(Sweden)	Uddevalla	22 June 2002 (age 24)	(Sweden) Mjällby AIF	9 August 2026	£3,500,000	30 June 2030
28	Ilyas Ansah	CF	(Germany)	Lüdenscheid	8 November 2004 (age 21)	(Germany) Union Berlin	1 September 2026	£12,800,000	30 June 2031
47	Robinio Vaz	CF	(France)	Mantes-la-Jolie	17 February 2007 (age 19)	(Italy) Roma	1 September 2026	Loan	30 June 2027
50	Mohamed-Ali Cho	RW	(France)	Stains	19 January 2004 (age 22)	(France) Nice	27 August 2026	£13,000,000	30 June 2031

=== Out on loan ===
No.	Player	Position	Nationality	Place of birth	Date of birth (age)	Previous club	Date signed	Fee	Contract end
16	Matty Jacob (Note: On loan at Newport County)	LB	(England)	Barnsley	3 June 2001 (age 25)	Academy	17 May 2019	—	30 June 2027
34	Harvey Cartwright (Note: On loan at Grimsby Town)	GK	(England)	Grimsby	9 May 2002 (age 24)	Academy	1 July 2019	—	30 June 2027
41	Tyrell Sellars-Fleming (Note: On loan at Scunthorpe United)	CF	(England)	Lincoln	31 May 2005 (age 21)	Scunthorpe United	21 August 2023	£150,000	30 June 2027
58	Cathal McCarthy (Note: On loan at Kilmarnock)	CB	(Republic of Ireland)	Caragh	31 August 2006 (age 19)	(Republic of Ireland) UCD	1 February 2025	£250,000	30 June 2027
—	Mason Burstow (Note: On loan at Sheffield Wednesday)	CF	(England)	Greenwich	4 August 2003 (age 22)	Chelsea	16 August 2024	£2,000,000	30 June 2028
—	Liam Millar (Note: On loan at Birmingham City)	LW	(Canada)	Toronto	27 September 1999 (age 26)	(Switzerland) Basel	9 August 2024	£1,500,000	30 June 2027
—	Thimothée Lo-Tutala (Note: On loan at Colchester United)	GK	(France)	Gonesse	13 February 2003 (age 23)	Tottenham Hotspur	6 April 2023	Free	30 June 2028

=== Left during season ===
No.	Player	Position	Nationality	Place of birth	Date of birth (age)	Subsequent club	Date left	Fee	Contract end
18	Cody Drameh	RB	(England)	Dulwich	8 December 2001 (age 24)	(Italy) Genoa	1 September 2026	£3,400,000	30 June 2031
30	David Akintola	RW	(Nigeria)	Oyo	13 January 1996 (age 30)	(Cyprus) Omonoia	9 September 2026	Free	30 June 2028

Source: Hull City A.F.C.

== Transfers and contracts ==
=== Transfers in ===
Date	Pos.	Player	From	Fee	Ref.
First team
2 July 2026	GK	(England) Jack Butland	(Scotland) Rangers	£3,000,000	
21 July 2026	CDM	(Ecuador) Óscar Zambrano	(Slovenia) Maribor	£3,500,000	
23 July 2026	LB	(England) Matt Targett	(England) Newcastle United	Free	
24 July 2026	CM	(Japan) Hidemasa Morita	(Portugal) Sporting CP	Free	
5 August 2026	GK	(Greece) Konstantinos Tzolakis	(Greece) Olympiacos	£20,000,000	
7 August 2026	CM	(Norway) Jens Hjertø-Dahl	(Norway) Tromsø	£8,000,000	
9 August 2026	LW	(Sweden) Elliot Stroud	(Sweden) Mjällby AIF	£3,500,000	
12 August 2026	CB	(Australia) Lucas Herrington	(United States) Colorado Rapids	£17,000,000	
12 August 2026	CB	(Senegal) Nobel Mendy	(Spain) Rayo Vallecano	£22,000,000	
15 August 2026	CDM	(France) Lucas Gourna-Douath	(Austria) Red Bull Salzburg	£3,000,000	
15 August 2026	CAM	(England) Joe Gelhardt	(England) Leeds United	£6,500,000	
27 August 2026	RW	(France) Mohamed-Ali Cho	(France) Nice	£13,000,000	
1 September 2026	CF	(Germany) Ilyas Ansah	(Germany) Union Berlin	£14,500,000 (Note: A potential further £6,000,000 in add-ons.)	
1 September 2026	CM	(England) Tim Iroegbunam	(England) Everton	£13,000,000 (Note: A potential further £9,000,000 in add-ons.)	
1 September 2026	CM	(Greece) Christos Mouzakitis	(Greece) Olympiacos	£12,850,000	
1 September 2026	RB	(England) Brooke Norton-Cuffy	(Italy) Genoa	£12,000,000	
1 September 2026	RW	(Wales) Sorba Thomas	(England) Stoke City	£7,500,000 (Note: A potential further £2,500,000 in add-ons.)	
Academy
7 July 2026	CB	(England) Ben Robinson	(England) Preston North End	Free	
14 August 2026	CB	(Northern Ireland) George Goodman	(England) Bradford City	Free	
2 September 2026	CF	(England) Kieran Wilson	(England) Exeter City	Undisclosed	
5 September 2026	GK	(Slovenia) Tilen Golič	(Slovenia) Ilirija 1911	Undisclosed	
8 September 2026	CF	(England) Damari Daley	(England) Norwich City	Free	

=== Transfers out ===
Date	Pos.	Player	To	Fee	Ref.
30 June 2026	GK	(Croatia) Ivor Pandur	(Scotland) Rangers	£6,000,000	
1 July 2026	CB	(England) Akin Famewo	(England) Bolton Wanderers	Undisclosed	
1 July 2026	CAM	(Albania) Aidon Shehu	(Greece) Panathinaikos	£2,600,000	
4 July 2026	CAM	(Jamaica) Kasey Palmer	(England) Luton Town	£500,000	
10 July 2026	CF	(Scotland) Kyle Joseph	(England) Middlesbrough	£4,000,000	
10 August 2026	RW	(England) Abu Kamara	(England) Portsmouth	£2,500,000	
14 August 2026	CF	(Turkey) Enis Destan	(Turkey) Konyaspor	Undisclosed	
1 September 2026	RB	(England) Cody Drameh	(Italy) Genoa	£3,400,000	

=== Loans in ===
Date	Pos.	Player	From	Loaned until	Ref.
1 September 2026	CF	(France) Robinio Vaz	(Italy) Roma	End of Season (Note: Option to make the move permanent.)	

=== Loans out ===
Date	Pos.	Player	To	Loaned until	Ref.
2 July 2026	CB	(England) James Debayo	(England) Swindon Town	End of season	
28 July 2026	CF	(England) Ramell Carter	(England) Worthing	17 September 2026 (Note: On 17 September, Carter was recalled back to Hull from his initial half-season loan at Worthing.)	
28 July 2026	GK	(England) Harvey Cartwright	(England) Grimsby Town	End of season	
31 July 2026	CF	(England) Mason Burstow	(England) Sheffield Wednesday	End of season	
1 August 2026	CM	(England) Nathan Tinsdale	(England) Crawley Town	End of season	
6 August 2026	GK	(France) Thimothée Lo-Tutala	(England) Colchester United	End of season	
14 August 2026	CF	(Republic of Ireland) Hugh Parker	(England) Scunthorpe United	2 January 2027	
18 August 2026	CB	(Republic of Ireland) Cathal McCarthy	(Scotland) Kilmarnock	End of season	
21 August 2026	LB	(Northern Ireland) Coist Walker	(England) Bridlington Town	19 September 2026	
1 September 2026	LW	(Canada) Liam Millar	(England) Birmingham City	End of season	
2 September 2026	LB	(England) Matty Jacob	(Wales) Newport County	2 January 2027	
3 September 2026	CB	(Nigeria) Calvin Okike	(Scotland) Greenock Morton	End of season	
3 September 2026	CF	(England) Tyrell Sellars-Fleming	(England) Scunthorpe United	End of season	
4 September 2026	CB	(Republic of Ireland) Stanley Ashbee	(England) Scunthorpe United	3 October 2026 (Note: On 8 October, Ashbee's initial one-month loan at Scunthorpe was extended until January.)	
6 October 2026	GK	(England) Khiani Shombe	(England) Stanway Rovers	6 November 2026	
23 October 2026	CF	(England) Ramell Carter	(England) Tamworth	23 November 2026	
6 November 2026	GK	(England) Aleksandr Gomeniuk	(England) Beverley Town	6 December 2026	
6 November 2026	GK	(Scotland) Kerr Reynolds	(England) Beverley Town	6 December 2026	
7 November 2026	LB	(England) Ed Devine	(England) Buxton	7 December 2026	

=== Released / Out of contract ===
Date	Pos.	Player	Subsequent club	Joined date	Ref.
30 June 2026	CAM	(Republic of Ireland) Harry Vaughan	(Republic of Ireland) Bohemian	1 July 2026	
30 June 2026	CB	(Poland) Oskar Gruszkowski	(United States) Rogers State Hillcats	1 August 2026	
30 June 2026	CAM	(England) Pharrell Brown			
30 June 2026	CM	(England) Rocco Coyle	(England) Gateshead	6 August 2026	
30 June 2026	CF	(Kenya) Sammy Henia-Kamau	(England) Jersey Bulls		
30 June 2026	RW	(Brazil) João Mendes	(Portugal) Portimonense	6 August 2026	
30 June 2026	CB	(England) Harry Revill	(England) Greenwich Borough	8 August 2026	
30 June 2026	RB	(England) Noah Wadsworth	(England) Buxton	8 August 2026	
30 June 2026	GK	(England) Callum Yam			
9 September 2026	RW	(Nigeria) David Akintola	(Cyprus) Omonia	9 September 2026	

=== New contracts ===
Date	Pos.	Player	Contract expiry	Ref.
10 June 2026	GK	(England) Harvey Cartwright	30 June 2027	
1 July 2026 (Note: The contract agreement was announced on 10 June, and would come into effect on 1 July.)	CF	(England) Ramell Carter	Undisclosed (Note: First professional contract)	
1 July 2026	CM	(England) Josh Ocaya	Undisclosed	
22 July 2026	CB	(Republic of Ireland) Stan Ashbee	30 June 2027	
22 July 2026	LB	(England) Ed Devine	30 June 2027 (Note: Club option to extend by a further year)	
22 July 2026	GK	(England) Archie Howard	30 June 2027	
27 July 2026	CF	(Wales) Zac Jagielka	30 June 2027	
27 July 2026	CB	(England) Charlie Leach	30 June 2027	
27 July 2026	CAM	(England) Alfie Maskell	31 December 2026	
27 July 2026	CB	(Nigeria) Calvin Okike	30 June 2028	
27 July 2026	CM	(England) Reuben Silk	30 June 2027	
18 August 2026	CB	(Republic of Ireland) Cathal McCarthy	30 June 2031	
3 September 2026	RW	(Algeria) Mohamed Belloumi	30 June 2029	
3 September 2026	CM	(England) Matt Crooks	30 June 2028	
3 September 2026	CB	(Republic of Ireland) John Egan	30 June 2028	
3 September 2026	CB	(England) Charlie Hughes	30 June 2029	
3 September 2026	CF	(Scotland) Oli McBurnie	30 June 2029	
3 September 2026	CDM	(England) Regan Slater	30 June 2029	
5 October 2026	GK	(England) Dillon Phillips	30 June 2028	
6 October 2026	GK	(England) Harvey Cartwright	30 June 2027	

== Pre-season and friendlies ==
On 13 July, Hull announced three pre-season friendlies; against Konyaspor, Çaykur Rizespor and Kasımpaşa. Two days later, a further two matches were confirmed against Eintracht Frankfurt and Nice.

Pre-season training started on 13 July when the team reported back to the Cottingham Training Ground. Later that week the team travelled to Slovenia in preparation for the first pre-season match against Konyaspor. Following the match against Çaykur Rizespor they relocated to Istanbul, Turkey for further pre-season training ready for the next match againt Eintracht Frankfurt.

Win Draw Loss Fixtures

25 July 2026 Friendly	Konyaspor	0–3	Hull City	Kidričevo, Slovenia
14:00 TRT		Report	Destan 28'; 53' (o.g.); Kamara 73'	Stadium: Aluminij Sports Park

28 July 2026 Friendly	Çaykur Rizespor	1–2	Hull City	Maribor, Slovenia
14:00 TRT	Bulut 73'	Report	McBurnie 57'; Dowell 58'	Stadium: Ljudski vrt

1 August 2026 Friendly	Kasımpaşa	1–1	Hull City	Istanbul, Turkey
14:00 TRT	Ben Ouanes 47'	Report	McBurnie 50'	Stadium: Recep Tayyip Erdoğan Stadium

8 August 2026 Friendly	Eintracht Frankfurt	2–0	Hull City	Frankfurt, Germany
15:00 CEST	Burkardt 57'; Arrhov 71'	Report		Stadium: maxworx Sportpark
Note: Match consisted of two one-hour halves.

15 August 2026 Friendly	Hull City	0–0	Nice	Kingston upon Hull
15:00 BST		Report		Stadium: The MKM Stadium; Attendance: 9,058

== Competitions ==
=== Overall record ===
Competition	First match	Last match	Starting round	Final position	Record							
Competition	First match	Last match	Starting round	Final position	Pld	W	D	L	GF	GA	GD	Win %
Premier League	22 August 2026	30 May 2027	Matchday 1	TBD	10	2	5	3	11	11	+0	20.00
FA Cup	8–11 January 2027	TBD	Third round	TBD	0	0	0	0	0	0	+0	—
EFL Cup	25 August 2026	8 September 2026	Second round	Third round	2	0	1	1	1	2	−1	0.00
Total					12	2	6	4	12	13	−1	16.67

Last updated: 7 November 2026
Source: Soccerway

=== Premier League ===
==== League table ====
Pos	Team	Pld	W	D	L	GF	GA	GD	Pts
9	Tottenham Hotspur	11	4	3	4	12	11	+1	15
10	Brentford	10	3	5	2	16	11	+5	14
11	Hull City	11	3	5	3	13	11	+2	14
12	Aston Villa	11	3	5	3	14	17	−3	14
13	Newcastle United	11	3	4	4	15	18	−3	13

Updated to match(es) played on 22 November 2026. Source: Premier League
Rules for classification: 1) Points; 2) Goal difference; 3) Goals scored; 4) If the champions, relegated teams or qualified teams for UEFA competitions cannot be determined by rules 1 to 3 following the completion of the competition, rules 4.1 to 4.3 are applied between such teams – 4.1) Head-to-head points; 4.2) Head-to-head away goals; 4.3) Play-off at a neutral site.

==== Results summary ====
Overall								Home						Away					
Pld	W	D	L	GF	GA	GD	Pts	W	D	L	GF	GA	GD	W	D	L	GF	GA	GD
11	3	5	3	13	11	+2	14	2	4	0	9	5	+4	1	1	3	4	6	−2

Last updated: 22 November 2026.
Source: Soccerway

==== Results by round ====
Round	1	2	3	4	5	6	7	8	9	10	11	12	13	14	15	16	17	18	19	20	21	22	23	24	25	26	27	28	29	30	31	32	33	34	35	36	37	38
Ground	H	A	H	A	A	H	A	H	H	A	H	A	H	A	H	A	H	H	A	A	H	A	H	A	H	A	H	A	A	H	A	H	A	H	A	H	A	H
Result	W	W	D	D	L	D	L	D	D	L	W																											
Position	5	3	3	4	8	8	9	10	11	13																												
Points	3	6	7	8	8	9	9	10	11	11	14																											

Updated to match(es) played on 22 November 2026. Source: Soccerway
A = Away; H = Home; W = Win; D = Draw; L = Loss; P = Postponed

==== Matches ====
The Premier League fixtures were released on 19 June 2026.

22 August 2026 1	Hull City	2–0	Manchester United	Kingston upon Hull
12:30 BST	Ajayi 17'; Mendy 38'; Crooks (yellow card) 42'; Millar (yellow card) 90+6'	Report	Dorgu (yellow card) 34'	Stadium: MKM Stadium; Attendance: 24,470; Referee: Darren England

29 August 2026 2	Coventry City	0–1	Hull City	Coventry
15:00 BST	Amenda (yellow card) 84'	Report	Coyle (yellow card) 10'; Slater (yellow card) 51'; Stroud (yellow card) 54'; McBurnie (yellow card) 68'; Millar 82'	Stadium: Coventry Building Society Arena; Attendance: 31,239; Referee: Josh Smith

5 September 2026 3	Hull City	0–0	Aston Villa	Kingston upon Hull
17:30 BST	Ajayi (yellow card) 39'; Gourna-Douath (yellow card) 67'	Report		Stadium: MKM Stadium; Attendance: 24,425; Referee: Michael Oliver
Note: Fixture was initially scheduled for a 15:00 kick-off, but was moved for live Sky Sports broadcast.

12 September 2026 4	Chelsea	2–2	Hull City	Fulham
15:00 BST	Rogers 7'; João Pedro 66'; Barco (yellow card) 80'	Report	McBurnie (yellow card) 17'; Belloumi 28', 34'; Egan (yellow card) 50'; Crooks (yellow card) 52'; Iroegbunam (yellow card) 88'; Norton-Cuffy (yellow card) 90+6'	Stadium: Stamford Bridge; Attendance: 39,352; Referee: Farai Hallam

19 September 2026 5	Newcastle United	2–1	Hull City	Newcastle upon Tyne
15:00 BST	Willock 3'; Hall 7'; Wissa (penalty missed) 45+2'; Murphy (yellow card) 45+3'	Report	Crooks (yellow card) 29'; Belloumi (yellow card) 39'; Tzolakis (yellow card) 45+2'; Giles (yellow card) 49'; Cho 67'	Stadium: St James' Park; Attendance: 52,647; Referee: Tony Harrington

11 October 2026 6	Hull City	2–2	Everton	Kingston upon Hull
14:00 BST	Crooks (yellow card) 13'; McBurnie (yellow card) 21'; Gelhardt 48'; Belloumi 74'	Report	Dewsbury-Hall 55'; Barry 68'	Stadium: MKM Stadium; Attendance: 24,458; Referee: Michael Salisbury
Note: Fixture was initially scheduled for a 15:00 kick-off on 10 October, but was pushed back due to Hull Fair and would now be broadcast live on Sky Sports.

17 October 2026 7	Fulham	1–0	Hull City	Fulham
15:00 BST	King (yellow card) 27'; Iwobi 33'; Berge (yellow card) 84'; Sessegnon (red card) 90+4'	Report	Herrington (yellow card) 22'; Slater (yellow card) 27'	Stadium: Craven Cottage; Attendance: 27,531; Referee: Chris Kavanagh

25 October 2026 8	Hull City	1–1	Brentford	Kingston upon Hull
14:00 BST	McBurnie 24' (pen.)	Report	Hickey (yellow card) 23'; Ouattara 63'	Stadium: MKM Stadium; Attendance: 24,259; Referee: Robert Jones
Note: Fixture was initially scheduled for a 15:00 kick-off on 24 October, but was pushed back for live Sky Sports.

31 October 2026 9	Hull City	2–2	Ipswich Town	Kingston upon Hull
15:00 GMT	Stroud (yellow card) 52'; Iroegbunam 58'; Crooks (yellow card) 60'; McBurnie 68'; Ajayi (yellow card) 88'	Report	Florentino 22'; Palacios (yellow card) 28'; Enciso 74', (yellow card) 81'; Diop (yellow card) 90+2'	Stadium: MKM Stadium; Attendance: 24,459; Referee: Thomas Kirk

7 November 2026 10	Arsenal	1–0	Hull City	Holloway
15:00 GMT	Ødegaard 72'	Report	Coyle (yellow card) 34'; Gourna-Douath (yellow card) 48'; Norton-Cuffy (yellow card) 61'; Stroud (yellow card) 75'; Mendy (yellow card) 87'	Stadium: Emirates Stadium; Attendance: 60,285; Referee: Farai Hallam

22 November 2026 11	Hull City	2–0	Brighton & Hove Albion	Kingston upon Hull
14:00 GMT	Mendy (yellow card) 37'; Gourna-Douath (yellow card) 59'; McBurnie 90+2', 90+5'	Report	Vušković (yellow card) 34'; Costinha (yellow card) 63' (yellow-red card) 89'; Andrés (yellow card) 81'	Stadium: MKM Stadium; Attendance: 24,461; Referee: Peter Bankes
Note: Fixture was initially scheduled for 21 November, but was pushed back a day for live Sky Sports broadcasting.

29 November 2026 12	Crystal Palace	v	Hull City	Selhurst
14:05 GMT				Stadium: Selhurst Park
Note: Fixture was initially scheduled for 28 November, but was pushed back a day for live Sky Sports broadcasting.

2 December 2026 13	Hull City	v	Nottingham Forest	Kingston upon Hull
20:00 GMT				Stadium: MKM Stadium
Note: Fixture was initially scheduled for a 20:00 kick-off, but was brought forward for live Sky Sports broadcasting.

5 December 2026 14	Bournemouth	v	Hull City	Bournemouth
15:00 GMT				Stadium: Dean Court

14 December 2026 15	Hull City	v	Tottenham Hotspur	Kingston upon Hull
20:00 GMT				Stadium: MKM Stadium
Note: Fixture was initially scheduled for 12 December, but was pushed back two days for live Sky Sports broadcasting.

19 December 2026 16	Manchester City	v	Hull City	Manchester
15:00 GMT				Stadium: Etihad Stadium

26 December 2026 17	Hull City	v	Liverpool	Kingston upon Hull
17:30 GMT				Stadium: MKM Stadium
Note: Fixture was initially scheduled for a 15:00 kick-off, but was pushed back for live Sky Sports broadcasting.

29 December 2026 18	Hull City	v	Leeds United	Kingston upon Hull
19:30 GMT				Stadium: MKM Stadium
Note: Fixture was initially scheduled for 30 December, but was brought forward for live Sky Sports broadcasting.

2 January 2027 19	Sunderland	v	Hull City	Sunderland
15:00 GMT				Stadium: Stadium of Light

5 January 2027 20	Nottingham Forest	v	Hull City	West Bridgford
19:30 GMT				Stadium: City Ground
Note: Fixture was initially scheduled for 6 January, but was brought forward for live Sky Sports broadcasting.

16 January 2027 21	Hull City	v	Arsenal	Kingston upon Hull
15:00 GMT				Stadium: MKM Stadium

23 January 2027 22	Ipswich Town	v	Hull City	Ipswich
15:00 GMT				Stadium: Portman Road

31 January 2027 23	Hull City	v	Crystal Palace	Kingston upon Hull
14:00 GMT				Stadium: MKM Stadium
Note: Fixture was initially scheduled for 30 January, but was pushed back a day due to Crystal Palace's UEFA Europa League commitments on the preceding Thursday.

6 February 2027 24	Brighton & Hove Albion	v	Hull City	Falmer
15:00 GMT				Stadium: Falmer Stadium

10 February 2027 25	Hull City	v	Sunderland	Kingston upon Hull
20:00 GMT				Stadium: MKM Stadium

20 February 2027 26	Liverpool	v	Hull City	Liverpool
15:00 GMT				Stadium: Anfield

27 February 2027 27	Hull City	v	Manchester City	Kingston upon Hull
15:00 GMT				Stadium: MKM Stadium

3 March 2027 28	Leeds United	v	Hull City	Leeds
20:00 GMT				Stadium: Elland Road

13 March 2027 29	Aston Villa	v	Hull City	Birmingham
15:00 GMT				Stadium: Villa Park

20 March 2027 30	Hull City	v	Chelsea	Kingston upon Hull
15:00 GMT				Stadium: MKM Stadium

10 April 2027 31	Manchester United	v	Hull City	Old Trafford
15:00 BST				Stadium: Old Trafford

17 April 2027 32	Hull City	v	Coventry City	Kingston upon Hull
15:00 BST				Stadium: MKM Stadium

24 April 2027 33	Tottenham Hotspur	v	Hull City	Tottenham
15:00 BST				Stadium: Tottenham Hotspur Stadium

1 May 2027 34	Hull City	v	Bournemouth	Kingston upon Hull
15:00 BST				Stadium: MKM Stadium

8 May 2027 35	Everton	v	Hull City	Liverpool
15:00 BST				Stadium: Hill Dickinson Stadium

15 May 2027 36	Hull City	v	Fulham	Kingston upon Hull
15:00 BST				Stadium: MKM Stadium

23 May 2027 37	Brentford	v	Hull City	Brentford
15:00 BST				Stadium: Brentford Community Stadium

30 May 2027 38	Hull City	v	Newcastle United	Kingston upon Hull
16:00 BST				Stadium: MKM Stadium

=== EFL Cup ===
As a non-competing European club in the Premier League, Hull City entered the EFL Cup in the second round, and were drawn away to Stoke City. They were then drawn away to Sunderland in the third round.

25 August 2026 Second round	Stoke City	1–1 (4–5 p)	Hull City	Stoke-on-Trent
19:45 BST	Boženík 39'; Hirst (yellow card) 90+5'	Report	Dowell 45'; Herrington (yellow card) 82'	Stadium: Bet365 Stadium; Attendance: 7,141; Referee: John Busby
	Penalties
	Thomas (penalty scored); Gallagher (penalty scored); Lawal (penalty scored); Hirst (penalty missed); Soumaré (penalty scored)		(penalty scored) Morita; (penalty scored) McNair; (penalty scored) Stroud; (penalty scored) Millar; (penalty scored) Belloumi

8 September 2026 Third round	Sunderland	1–0	Hull City	Sunderland
19:45 BST	O'Nien (yellow card) 62'; Taibi 71'	Report	Gourna-Douath (yellow card) 54'; Egan (yellow card) 72'; Stroud (yellow card) 90+4'	Stadium: Stadium of Light; Attendance: 25,472; Referee: Paul Tierney

== Statistics ==
=== Appearances and goals ===
As of match played 7 November 2026

Players with no appearances are not included on the list; italics indicate a loaned in player.

No.	Pos	Nat	Player	Total		Premier League		FA Cup		EFL Cup	
No.	Pos	Nat	Player	Apps	Goals	Apps	Goals	Apps	Goals	Apps	Goals
2	DF	(England) ENG	Lewie Coyle	11	0	10+0	0	0+0	0	1	0
3	DF	(England) ENG	Ryan Giles	10	0	8+2	0	0+0	0	0	0
5	MF	(Japan) JPN	Hidemasa Morita	6	0	1+4	0	0+0	0	0+1	0
6	DF	(Nigeria) NGR	Semi Ajayi	10	1	10+0	1	0+0	0	0	0
7	FW	(Wales) WAL	Sorba Thomas	5	0	3+1	0	0+0	0	1	0
9	FW	(Scotland) SCO	Oli McBurnie	10	2	10+0	2	0+0	0	0	0
10	FW	(Algeria) ALG	Mohamed Belloumi	10	3	8+1	3	0+0	0	0+1	0
11	FW	(England) ENG	Joe Gelhardt	7	1	1+5	1	0+0	0	0+1	0
12	GK	(England) ENG	Dillon Phillips	2	0	0+0	0	0+0	0	2	0
14	MF	(Norway) NOR	Jens Hjertø-Dahl	3	0	0+1	0	0+0	0	2	0
15	DF	(Republic of Ireland) IRL	John Egan	11	0	10+0	0	0+0	0	0+1	0
17	DF	(Northern Ireland) NIR	Paddy McNair	2	0	0+1	0	0+0	0	1	0
18	DF	(England) ENG	Brooke Norton-Cuffy	6	0	1+5	0	0+0	0	0	0
19	GK	(Greece) GRE	Konstantinos Tzolakis	10	0	10+0	0	0+0	0	0	0
21	FW	(Sweden) SWE	Elliot Stroud	10	0	7+1	0	0+0	0	0+2	0
22	DF	(Australia) AUS	Lucas Herrington	10	0	3+5	0	0+0	0	2	0
23	DF	(England) ENG	Matt Targett	3	0	0+1	0	0+0	0	2	0
25	MF	(England) ENG	Matt Crooks	7	0	5+1	0	0+0	0	1	0
26	MF	(England) ENG	Kieran Dowell	1	1	0+0	0	0+0	0	1	1
27	MF	(England) ENG	Regan Slater	12	0	10+0	0	0+0	0	0+2	0
29	MF	(France) FRA	Lucas Gourna-Douath	6	0	2+2	0	0+0	0	2	0
32	DF	(Senegal) SEN	Nobel Mendy	8	1	7+0	1	0+0	0	1	0
33	MF	(Turkey) TUR	Abdülkadir Ömür	1	0	0+0	0	0+0	0	1	0
36	MF	(Greece) GRE	Christos Mouzakitis	2	0	0+1	0	0+0	0	0+1	0
41	FW	(England) ENG	Tyrell Sellars-Fleming	1	0	0+0	0	0+0	0	0+1	0
42	MF	(England) ENG	Tim Iroegbunam	7	1	3+4	1	0+0	0	0	0
47	FW	(France) FRA	Robinio Vaz	6	0	0+5	0	0+0	0	1	0
50	FW	(France) FRA	Mohamed-Ali Cho	8	1	1+6	1	0+0	0	1	0
Player who featured but departed the club on loan during the season:
7	FW	(Canada) CAN	Liam Millar	3	1	0+2	1	0	0	1	0
Players who featured but departed the club permanently during the season:
18	DF	(England) ENG	Cody Drameh	3	0	0+2	0	0	0	1	0
30	FW	(Nigeria) NGR	David Akintola	1	0	0	0	0	0	1	0

=== Disciplinary record ===
As of match played 7 November 2026

Rank	Number	Player	Position	Premier League		FA Cup		EFL Cup		Total	
Rank	Number	Player	Position	Yellow card	Red card	Yellow card	Red card	Yellow card	Red card	Yellow card	Red card
1	25	(England) Matt Crooks	CM	5	0	0	0	0	0	5	0
2	9	(Scotland) Oli McBurnie	CF	4	0	0	0	0	0	4	0
2	21	(Sweden) Elliot Stroud	LW	3	0	0	0	1	0	4	0
4	29	(France) Lucas Gourna-Douath	CDM	2	0	0	0	1	0	3	0
5	2	(England) Lewie Coyle	RB	2	0	0	0	0	0	2	0
5	6	(Nigeria) Semi Ajayi	CB	2	0	0	0	0	0	2	0
5	15	(Republic of Ireland) John Egan	CB	1	0	0	0	1	0	2	0
5	18	(England) Brooke Norton-Cuffy	RB	2	0	0	0	0	0	2	0
5	22	(Australia) Lucas Herrington	CB	1	0	0	0	1	0	2	0
5	27	(England) Regan Slater	CDM	2	0	0	0	0	0	2	0
11	3	(England) Ryan Giles	RB	1	0	0	0	0	0	1	0
11	7	(Canada) Liam Millar	LW	1	0	0	0	0	0	1	0
11	10	(Algeria) Mohamed Belloumi	RW	1	0	0	0	0	0	1	0
11	19	(Greece) Konstantinos Tzolakis	GK	1	0	0	0	0	0	1	0
11	32	(Senegal) Nobel Mendy	CB	1	0	0	0	0	0	1	0
11	42	(England) Tim Iroegbunam	CM	1	0	0	0	0	0	1	0
Total				30	0	0	0	4	0	34	0

== Kits ==
Oxen Sports was announced as the new kit supplier for the season. The home kit would be wide black and amber vertical striped shirt with white trim. The shorts would be white, with black and amber horizontal striped socks. The goalkeeper's kit would be all dark green with white trim. The away kit was announced on 23 July to be a white shirt with black and amber detail on the front of the shoulders, neck and arm bands. The socks would also be white with a black and amber trim, while the shorts would be black. The third kit was announced on 7 September 2026 and was to feature in the League Cup match against Sunderland the following day. The shirt would be all blue with a white collar and sleeves, both with fine blue and gold trims.

Corendon Airlines have agreed an extension to their sponsorship deal with the club until the end of the 2028–29 season and their logo will be on the front of both home and away kits.

== Awards ==
=== Player awards ===
==== Premier League Player of the Month ====
Month	Pos.	Player	Pld	G	A	CS	S	Result	Ref.
August	GK	(Greece) Konstantinos Tzolakis	2	—	—	2	5	Nominated	
September	FW	(Algeria) Mohamed Belloumi	3	2	1	—	—	Nominated	

==== Premier League Save of the Month ====
Month	Pos.	Player	Opposition	Result	Ref.
August	GK	(Greece) Konstantinos Tzolakis	v. Manchester United	Nominated	
August	GK	(Greece) Konstantinos Tzolakis	v. Coventry City	Nominated	

=== Manager awards ===
==== Premier League Manager of the Month ====
Month	Manager	M	W	D	L	GF	GA	GD	Pts	Result	Ref.
August	(Bosnia and Herzegovina) Sergej Jakirović	2	2	0	0	3	0	+3	6	Won	
