= Hilan Hamzaoui =

Ivorian footballer (born 2004)

Personal information
- Full name: Hilan Hamzaoui Slimani
- Date of birth: 15 February 2006 (age 20)
- Place of birth: Marseille, France
- Height: 1.87 m (6 ft 2 in)
- Position: Centre-back

Team information
- Current team: Marseille
- Number: 72

Youth career
- 2017–2023: Marseille

Senior career*
| Years | Team | Apps | (Gls) |
| 2023– | Marseille II | 17 | (1) |
| 2026– | Marseille | 1 | (0) |
- * Club domestic league appearances and goals as of 13:42, 11 May 2026 (UTC) ‡ National team caps and goals as of 13:42, 11 May 2026 (UTC)

Hilan Hamzaoui Slimani (born 15 February 2006) is a professional footballer who plays as a centre-back for Ligue 1 club Marseille. Born in France, he has opted to play for Algeria internationally.

== Club career ==
A youth product of Marseille, Hamzaoui was promoted to Marseille's reserves in the Championnat National 3 in 2023. He signed his first professional contract with the club on 22 February 2024 for 5 years. On 2 May 2026, he debuted with Marseille as a substitute in a 3–1 Ligue 1 loss to Nantes.

== International career ==
Hamzaoui was born in France and is of Algerian descent. He was called up to the Algeria U23s in March 2026.
