= 2024–25 Hull City A.F.C. season =

English football club season

Hull City
2024–25 season
- Owner: Acun Medya
- Chairman: Acun Ilıcalı
- Head coach: Tim Walter (until 27 November); Andy Dawson (interim, 27 November – 9 December); Rubén Sellés (from 9 December)
- Stadium: MKM Stadium
- Championship: 21st
- FA Cup: Third round
- EFL Cup: First round
- Top goalscorer: League: João Pedro (6); All: João Pedro (6)
- Highest home attendance: 24,463 (v Leeds United, 4 January, Championship)
- Lowest home attendance: 9,281 (v Sheffield Wednesday, 14 August, EFL Cup); 18,694 (v Watford, 11 December, Championship)
- Average home league attendance: 21,323
- Biggest win: 4–1 (v Cardiff City, 28 September); 3–0 (v Sheffield United, 24 January)
- Biggest defeat: 0–4 (v Norwich City, 5 October)
Home colours	Away colours	Third colours

The 2024–25 season was the 121st season in the history of Hull City Association Football Club and their fourth consecutive season in the Championship. In addition to the domestic league, the club participated in the FA Cup and the EFL Cup.

== Events ==
- On 31 May 2024, Tim Walter was appointed as the new manager of the club and would take up the post on 1 July 2024.
- On 28 June 2024, it was announced that George Dickinson would join on a free transfer from Sheffield United on 1 July 2024, once his contract with them expired.
- On 1 July 2024, Ryan Woods left the club by mutual consent.
- On 1 July 2024, Harry Wood signed for Shelbourne for an undisclosed fee.
- On 3 July 2024, Noah Wadsworth joined from Bradford City on a free transfer.
- On 4 July 2024, Julian Hübner and Filip Tapalović were appointed as assistant head coaches.
- On 5 July 2024, Erbil Bozkurt was announced as the new goalkeeping coach at the club after Barry Richardson left the role at the end of the previous season.
- On 9 July 2024, Óscar Estupiñán was recalled from his loan at Esporte Clube Bahia.
- On 12 July 2024, Callum Jones joined Morecambe on a season-long loan.
- On 12 July 2024, Jacob Greaves signed for Ipswich Town for an undisclosed fee, after 16 years at the club.
- On 19 July 2024, Jaden Philogene returned to Aston Villa for an undisclosed fee.
- On 19 July 2024, Matt Ingram moved to Oxford United for an undisclosed fee.
- On 23 July 2024, Cody Drameh joined from Leeds United, signing a three-year deal for an undisclosed fee.
- On 24 July 2024, Pharrell Brown of Fleetwood Town signed a two-year deal with the club for an undisclosed fee.
- On 26 July 2024, Jason Lokilo moved to CSKA Sofia for an undisclosed fee.
- On 29 July 2024, James Furlong joined AFC Wimbledon on a season-long loan.
- On 1 August 2024, Marvin Mehlem was signed for undisclosed fee, arriving from Darmstadt 98 on a two-year deal.
- On 2 August 2024, Henry Sandat signed a season-long loan deal with Wealdstone.
- On 5 August 2024, Kyle Fanning joined Bridlington Town on a short-term loan.
- On 5 August 2024, Brandon Harriman-Annous joined from Brentford on a free transfer.
- On 6 August 2024, Will Jarvis was recalled early from his loan at Shelbourne.
- On 8 August 2024, Anthony Racioppi signed a three-year deal with the club, joining from Young Boys for an undisclosed fee.
- On 9 August 2024, it was announced that Finley Burns had joined the club on a season-long loan from Manchester City.
- On 9 August 2024, Liam Millar signed for an undisclosed fee from Basel on a three-year deal.
- On 14 August 2024, the club announced that Jared Dublin had been appointed as the new Head of Recruitment, replacing Lee Darnbrough who left the position at the end of the previous season.
- On 15 August 2024, Brandon Fleming was loaned out to Doncaster Rovers for the remainder of the season.
- On 16 August 2024, Charlie Hughes signed a four-year deal, arriving from boyhood club Wigan Athletic for an undisclosed fee.
- On 16 August 2024, Aidon Shehu joined the club's academy setup after a successful trial period.
- On 16 August 2024, Mason Burstow joined the club from Chelsea on a four-year deal, signing for an undisclosed fee.
- On 16 August 2024, the club announced that Óscar Zambrano had been loaned in for the season, with an option to buy in the summer of 2025.
- On 17 August 2024, Cameron Gray was loaned out to Barton Town on a month-long work experience loan, this was later extended to 23 October 2024.
- On 21 August 2024, Paul Iggulden joined Stocksbridge Park Steels on a month-long loan.
- On 21 August 2024, the academy announced the signing of Zane Myers for the Under-21s team, following a successful trial period.
- On 22 August 2024, Chris Bedia was signed on a season-long loan from Union Berlin, with an option to buy in the summer of 2025.
- On 23 August 2024, the club confirmed the departure of Jean Michaël Seri to Al-Orobah.
- On 23 August 2024, both Jaedyn Chibanga and Alfie Taylor were loaned out to Grimsby Borough on three-month deals.
- On 27 August 2024, Gustavo Puerta was loaned in for the season from Bayer Leverkusen, with an option to buy in the summer of 2025.
- On 29 August 2024, Óscar Estupiñán left the club to join FC Juárez for an undisclosed fee.
- On 30 August 2024, Carl Rushworth was loaned in from Brighton & Hove Albion on a season-long deal.
- On 30 August 2024, Kasey Palmer signed a three-year deal from Coventry City for an undisclosed fee.
- On 30 August 2024, Mohamed Belloumi signed a four-year deal with the club, arriving from Farense for an undisclosed fee.
- On 30 August 2024, Abu Kamara joined on a four-year deal from Norwich City for an undisclosed fee.
- On 31 August 2024, Sam Opoku joined Beverley Town on a month-long loan to gain work experience.
- On 9 September 2024, Steven Alzate was signed on a two-year deal following his release from Brighton & Hove Albion.
- On 11 September 2024, Thimothée Lo-Tutala signed a contract extension with Hull City keeping him at the club until 2028.
- On 11 September 2024, Matt Hare left the club after 17 years for a position of Club Talent Pathway Manager with The Football Association.
- On 26 September 2024, João Pedro joined on a free transfer from Fenerbahçe on a one-year deal.
- On 3 October 2024, Sam Opoku left the club after his extended scholarship ended.
- On 12 October 2024, Sincere Hall and Kyle Fanning joined Liversedge on a month-long loan spell.
- On 17 October 2024, Vice-chairman Tan Kesler left the club by mutual consent.
- On 20 October 2024, Raich Carter was inducted into Hull City's Hall of Fame at the 'Raich Carter Trophy' match against Sunderland.
- On 25 October 2024, Cameron Gray moved to Brighouse Town on a month-long work experience loan.
- On 2 November 2024, Tyrell Sellars-Fleming signed a new two-and-a-half year contract with the club.
- On 27 November 2024, the club parted ways with head coach Tim Walter following a run of four straight defeats and nine games without a win, to be replaced by Andy Dawson as interim head coach. Assistant head coaches Julian Hübner and Filip Tapalović also left the club.
- On 6 December 2024, Rubén Sellés was appointed as head coach of the club on a two-and-a-half-year deal, taking up his position from 9 December. Sellés brought James Oliver-Pearce, as assistant head coach, and Tobias Loveland, as first-team coach, from Reading.
- On 23 December 2024, Noah Wadsworth joined Chester on a month-long loan spell.
- On 26 December 2024, Stan Ashbee and Jack Leckie joined Farsley Celtic on month-long loan spells.
- On 1 January 2025, Stuart Elliott was inducted in to the club's hall of fame.
- On 1 January 2025, Kyle Fanning joined Matlock Townon a month-long loan spell.
- On 3 January 2025, Marvin Mehlem moved on a season-long loan to Paderborn 07.
- On 6 January 2025, Will Jarvis signed a three-and-a-half-year deal with Notts County for an undisclosed fee.
- On 9 January 2025, Brandon Fleming was recalled from his loan spell with Doncaster Rovers.
- On 9 January 2025, Henry Sandat was recalled from his loan with Wealdstone and subsequently joined Sutton United permanently.
- On 10 January 2025, Matt Crooks of Real Salt Lake signed a two-and-a-half-year deal with the club for an undisclosed fee.
- On 15 January 2025, Joe Gelhardt of Leeds United signed on loan for the remainder of the season.
- On 16 January 2025, Stan Hewitt joined Liversedge on a one-month work experience loan spell.
- On 17 January 2025, Nordin Amrabat signed from AEK Athens until the end of the season on a free transfer.
- On 17 January 2025, Jake Leake moved to Oldham Athletic on loan for the remainer of the season.
- On 20 January 2025, Kyle Joseph joined on a three-and-a-half-year deal from Blackpool for an undisclosed fee.
- On 22 January 2025, Carl Rushworth was recalled by his parent club Brighton & Hove Albion.
- On 23 January 2025, Lincoln joined on loan from Fenerbahçe for the remainder of the season.
- On 23 January 2025, Ryan Giles joined Middlesbrough on loan until the end of the season.
- On 24 January 2025, Ryan Longman signed a two-and-a-half-year contract with Wrexham for an undisclosed fee.
- On 24 January 2025, Eliot Matazo joined from Monaco on a three-and-a-half-year deal for an undisclosed fee.
- On 29 January 2025, Aidan Durkan joined Beverley Town on a month-long work experience loan.
- On 29 January 2025, Louie Barry joined on loan from Aston Villa for the remainder of the season.
- On 31 January 2025, Anthony Racioppi joined 1. FC Köln on loan until the end of the season.
- On 1 February 2025, Cathal McCarthy joined the academy from UCD for an undisclosed fee, but was loaned back to them for the remainer of the season.
- On 1 February 2025, Chris Bedia was recalled by Union Berlin.
- On 3 February 2025, John Egan of Burnley signed an eighteen-month contract for an undisclosed fee.
- On 3 February 2025, Yuriel Celi moved to Club Universitario de Deportes for an undisclosed fee.
- On 3 February 2025, Xavier Simons moved on loan to Wycombe Wanderers for the remainer of the season.
- On 3 February 2025, Andy Smith moved on loan to Gillingham for the remainer of the season.
- On 4 February 2025, Hugh Parker joined the academy from UCD on a two-and-a-half year deal for an undisclosed fee.
- On 6 February 2025, Jaedyn Chibanga joined North Ferriby on a one-month loan spell.
- On 10 February 2025, Abdülkadir Ömür joined Çaykur Rizespor on loan until the end of the season.
- On 11 February 2025, Owen Foster joined Hartlepool United on a month-long loan spell.
- On 14 February 2025, Brandon Fleming moved to Forest Green Rovers on loan until the end of the season.
- On 14 February 2025, Tyrell Sellars-Fleming moved to Gateshead on loan until the end of the season.
- On 18 March 2025, Alfie Taylor joined Cleethorpes Town on loan for the remainder of the season.
- On 21 March 2025, Thimothée Lo-Tutala joined Crawley Town on an emergency seven-day loan.
- On 22 March 2025, Jack Leckie joined Chorley on loan for the remainder of the season.
- On 27 March 2025, Owen Foster joined Torquay United on loan until the end of the season.
- On 27 March 2025, Noah Wadsworth joined Boston United on loan until the end of the season.
- On 28 March 2025, Callum Yam joined Emley on loan until the end of the season.
- On 19 April 2025, Hull announced that Gustavo Puerta had activated a clause in his contract that would see him join the club on a permanent basis from 1 July 2025.
- On 15 May 2025, the club announced that they had parted company with Rubén Sellés, assistant James Oliver-Pearce and first-team coach Tobias Loveland also left the club.
- On 21 May 2025, Martin Hodge was announced as the club's new Head of Recruitment.
- On 29 May 2025, the head coach of the U18s, David Meyler, left his role at the club after Cork City signed him as their new assistant manager.

== Coaching staff ==
Position	Name
Head coach	(Germany) Tim Walter (Until 27 November) (Spain) Rubén Sellés (From 9 December – 15 May 2025)
Assistant head coaches	(Germany) Julian Hübner (Until 27 November) (Croatia) Filip Tapalović (Until 27 November) (England) James Oliver-Pearce (From 9 December – 15 May 2025)
First team coaches	(England) Andy Dawson (England) Tobias Loveland (From 9 December – 15 May 2025)
Goalkeeping coach	(England) Erbil Bozkurt

Source: Hull City A.F.C.

== Squad ==
As of 13 October 2024.

No.	Player	Position	Nationality	Place of birth	Date of birth (age) (Note: Players' ages listed as they were on 1 July 2024, the official start date of the 2024–25 season)	Previous club	Date signed	Fee	Contract end
Goalkeepers
1	Ivor Pandur	GK	(Croatia)	Rijeka	25 March 2000 (age 24)	(Netherlands) Fortuna Sittard	20 January 2024	Undisclosed	30 June 2027
22	Carl Rushworth	GK	(England)	Halifax	2 July 2001 (age 22)	Brighton & Hove Albion	30 August 2024	Loan	31 May 2025
31	Anthony Racioppi	GK	(Switzerland)	Geneva	31 December 1998 (age 25)	(Switzerland) Young Boys	8 August 2024	Undisclosed	30 June 2027
32	Thimothée Lo-Tutala	GK	(France)	Gonesse	13 February 2003 (age 21)	Tottenham Hotspur	6 April 2023	Free	30 June 2025
34	Harvey Cartwright	GK	(England)	Grimsby	9 May 2002 (age 22)	Academy	1 July 2019	–	30 June 2026
40	Owen Foster	GK	(England)	Kingston upon Hull	7 January 2005 (age 19)	Scunthorpe United	3 July 2023	Undisclosed	30 June 2025
Defenders
2	Lewie Coyle	RB	(England)	Kingston upon Hull	15 October 1995 (age 28)	Fleetwood Town	7 August 2020	Undisclosed	30 June 2026
3	Ryan Giles	LB	(England)	Telford	26 January 2000 (age 24)	Luton Town	27 June 2024	Undisclosed	30 June 2027
4	Charlie Hughes	CB	(England)	Golborne	16 October 2003 (age 20)	Wigan Athletic	16 August 2024	Undisclosed	30 June 2028
5	Alfie Jones	CB	(England)	Bristol	7 October 1997 (age 26)	Southampton	4 September 2020	Undisclosed	30 June 2026
6	Sean McLoughlin	CB	(Republic of Ireland)	Cork	13 November 1996 (age 27)	(Republic of Ireland) Cork City	26 July 2019	Undisclosed	30 June 2026
17	Finley Burns	CB	(England)	Southwark	17 June 2003 (age 21)	Manchester City	9 August 2024	Loan	31 May 2025
23	Cody Drameh	RB	(England)	Dulwich	8 December 2001 (age 22)	Leeds United	23 July 2024	Undisclosed	30 June 2027
26	Andy Smith	CB	(England)	Banbury	11 September 2001 (age 22)	Academy	1 July 2020	–	30 June 2026
29	Matty Jacob	LB	(England)	Barnsley	3 June 2001 (age 23)	Academy	1 July 2019	–	30 June 2027
39	Alfie Taylor	CB	(England)	Kingston upon Hull	22 February 2004 (age 20)	Academy	11 May 2022	–	30 June 2025
43	Stan Ashbee	CB	(Republic of Ireland)	(England) Kingston upon Hull	28 November 2006 (age 17)	Academy	7 December 2023	–	30 June 2026
53	Jake Leake	CB	(England)	Kingston upon Hull	20 February 2003 (age 21)	Academy	1 July 2021	–	30 June 2025
Midfielders
8	Marvin Mehlem	AM	(Germany)	Karlsruhe	11 September 1997 (age 26)	(Germany) Darmstadt 98	1 August 2024	Undisclosed	30 June 2026
10	Abdülkadir Ömür	AM	(Turkey)	Trabzon	25 June 1999 (age 25)	(Turkey) Trabzonspor	1 February 2024	Undisclosed	30 June 2027
14	Harry Vaughan	AM	(Republic of Ireland)	(England) Trafford	6 April 2004 (age 20)	Oldham Athletic	31 January 2023	Youth Fee	30 June 2026
18	Xavier Simons	DM	(England)	Hammersmith	20 February 2003 (age 21)	Chelsea	1 July 2023	Undisclosed	30 June 2026
20	Gustavo Puerta	CM	(Colombia)	La Victoria	23 July 2003 (age 20)	(Germany) Bayer Leverkusen	27 August 2024	Loan	31 May 2025
25	Óscar Zambrano	DM	(Ecuador)	Santo Domingo	20 April 2004 (age 20)	(Ecuador) L.D.U. Quito	16 August 2024	Loan	31 May 2025
27	Regan Slater	CM	(England)	Gleadless	11 September 1999 (age 24)	Sheffield United	27 January 2022	Undisclosed	30 June 2026
42	Rocco Coyle	CM	(England)	Kingston upon Hull	20 August 2006 (age 17)	Academy	7 December 2023	–	30 June 2026
45	Kasey Palmer	AM	(Jamaica)	(England) Lewisham	9 November 1996 (age 27)	Coventry City	30 August 2024	Undisclosed	30 June 2027
47	Nathan Tinsdale	CM	(England)	Leeds	5 August 2005 (age 19)	Academy	5 June 2023	–	30 June 2026
Forwards
7	Liam Millar	LW	(Canada)	Toronto	27 September 1999 (age 24)	(Switzerland) Basel	9 August 2024	Undisclosed	30 June 2027
9	Chris Bedia	CF	(Ivory Coast)	Abidjan	5 March 1996 (age 28)	(Germany) Union Berlin	22 August 2024	Loan	31 May 2025
11	Doğukan Sinik	LW	(Turkey)	Antalya	21 January 1999 (age 25)	(Turkey) Antalyaspor	31 January 2022	Undisclosed	30 June 2025
16	Ryan Longman	RW	(England)	Redhill	6 November 2000 (age 23)	Brighton & Hove Albion	20 July 2022	Undisclosed	30 June 2025
33	Mohamed Belloumi	RW	(Algeria)	Mascara	1 June 2002 (age 22)	(Portugal) Farense	30 August 2024	Undisclosed	30 June 2028
36	Will Jarvis	RW	(England)	York	17 December 2002 (age 21)	Academy	1 July 2021	–	30 June 2026
41	Tyrell Sellars-Fleming	CF	(England)	Lincoln	31 May 2005 (age 19)	Scunthorpe United	21 August 2023	Free	30 June 2025
44	Abu Kamara	CF	(England)	Lambeth	21 July 2003 (age 20)	Norwich City	30 August 2024	Undisclosed	30 June 2028
48	Mason Burstow	CF	(England)	Greenwich	4 August 2003 (age 20)	Chelsea	16 August 2024	Undisclosed	30 June 2028
Out on loan
21	Brandon Fleming	LB	(England)	Dewsbury	3 December 1999 (age 24)	Academy	1 July 2017	–	30 June 2025
28	Callum Jones	CM	(Wales)	(England) Birkenhead	5 April 2001 (age 23)	Bury	20 August 2019	Youth Fee	30 June 2025
38	Sincere Hall	CF	(Bermuda)	Unknown	12 June 2004 (age 20)	Academy	28 August 2021	–	30 June 2025
–	Yuriel Celi	AM	(Peru)	Callao	20 February 2002 (age 22)	(Peru) Mannucci	31 January 2023	Undisclosed	30 June 2025
–	James Furlong	LB	(Republic of Ireland)	Dublin	7 June 2002 (age 22)	Brighton & Hove Albion	1 September 2023	Undisclosed	30 June 2026

== Transfers ==
=== In ===
Date	Pos.	Player	From	Fee	Ref.
27 June 2024	LB	Ryan Giles (ENG)	Luton Town (ENG)	Undisclosed	
1 July 2024 (Note: Dickinson's transfer was announced on 28 June, and would become official on 1 July once his Sheffield United contract expired)	CM	George Dickinson (ENG) (Note: Signed initially for the club's academy setup)	Sheffield United (ENG)	Free	
3 July 2024	LB	Noah Wadsworth (ENG)	Bradford City (ENG)	Free	
23 July 2024	RB	Cody Drameh (ENG)	Leeds United (ENG)	Undisclosed	
24 July 2024	AM	Pharrell Brown (ENG)	Fleetwood Town (ENG)	Undisclosed	
1 August 2024	AM	Marvin Mehlem (GER)	Darmstadt 98 (GER)	Undisclosed	
5 August 2024	CM	Brandon Harriman-Annous (ENG)	Brentford (ENG)	Free	
8 August 2024	GK	Anthony Racioppi (SUI)	Young Boys (SUI)	Undisclosed	
9 August 2024	LW	Liam Millar (CAN)	Basel (SUI)	Undisclosed	
16 August 2024	CF	Mason Burstow (ENG)	Chelsea (ENG)	Undisclosed	
16 August 2024	CB	Charlie Hughes (ENG)	Wigan Athletic (ENG)	Undisclosed	
16 August 2024	CM	Aidon Shehu (ALB)	Southend United (ENG)	Undisclosed	
21 August 2024	LB	Zane Myers (ENG)	Millwall (ENG)	Free	
30 August 2024	AM	Kasey Palmer (JAM)	Coventry City (ENG)	Undisclosed	
30 August 2024	RW	Mohamed Belloumi (ALG)	Farense (POR)	Undisclosed	
30 August 2024	CF	Abu Kamara (ENG)	Norwich City (ENG)	Undisclosed	
9 September 2024	CM	Steven Alzate (COL)	Brighton & Hove Albion (ENG)	Free	
26 September 2024	MF	João Pedro (ITA)	Fenerbahçe (TUR)	Free	
7 October 2024	GK	Shea Callister (ENG)	Clitheroe (ENG)	Free	
10 January 2025	AM	Matt Crooks (ENG)	Real Salt Lake (USA)	Undisclosed	
17 January 2025	RW	Nordin Amrabat (MAR)	AEK Athens (GRE)	Free	
20 January 2025	CF	Kyle Joseph (SCO)	Blackpool (ENG)	Undisclosed	
24 January 2025	CM	Eliot Matazo (BEL)	Monaco (FRA)	Undisclosed	
1 February 2025	CB	Cathal McCarthy (IRL)	UCD (IRL)	Undisclosed	
3 February 2025	CB	John Egan (IRL)	Burnley (ENG)	Undisclosed	
4 February 2025	CF	Hugh Parker (IRL)	UCD (IRL)	Undisclosed	

=== Out ===
Date	Pos.	Player	To	Fee	Ref.
14 June 2024 (Note: The transfer was announced on 11 June, and would become official on 14 June once the transfer window re-opened)	RB	Tom Nixon (ENG)	Doncaster Rovers (ENG)	Undisclosed	
18 June 2024	GK	Ryan Allsop (ENG)	Birmingham City (ENG)	Undisclosed	
27 June 2024	CM	Ozan Tufan (TUR)	Trabzonspor (TUR)	Undisclosed	
1 July 2024	CM	Harry Wood (ENG)	Shelbourne (IRL)	Undisclosed	
12 July 2024	CB	Jacob Greaves (ENG)	Ipswich Town (ENG)	Undisclosed	
19 July 2024	LW	Jaden Philogene (ENG)	Aston Villa (ENG)	Undisclosed	
19 July 2024	GK	Matt Ingram (ENG)	Oxford United (ENG)	Undisclosed	
26 July 2024	RW	Jason Lokilo (COD)	CSKA Sofia (BUL)	Undisclosed	
23 August 2024	CM	Jean Michaël Seri (CIV)	Al-Orobah (KSA)	Undisclosed	
29 August 2024	CF	Óscar Estupiñán (COL)	FC Juárez (MEX)	Undisclosed	
6 January 2025	CF	Will Jarvis (ENG)	Notts County (ENG)	Undisclosed	
9 January 2025	CF	Henry Sandat (ENG)	Sutton United (ENG)	Undisclosed	
24 January 2025	LW	Ryan Longman (ENG)	Wrexham (WAL)	Undisclosed	
3 February 2025	AM	Yuriel Celi (PER)	Club Universitario de Deportes (PER)	Undisclosed	

=== Loaned in ===
Date	Pos.	Player	From	Date until	Ref.
9 August 2024	CB	Finley Burns (ENG)	Manchester City (ENG)	End of Season	
16 August 2024	DM	Óscar Zambrano (ECU)	L.D.U. Quito (ECU)	End of Season	
22 August 2024	CF	Chris Bedia (CIV)	Union Berlin (GER)	2 February 2025 (Note: On 2 February, Bedia was recalled to his parent club Union Berlin)	
27 August 2024	CM	Gustavo Puerta (COL)	Bayer Leverkusen (GER)	End of season	
30 August 2024	GK	Carl Rushworth (ENG)	Brighton & Hove Albion (ENG)	22 January 2025 (Note: On 22 January, Rushworth was recalled to his parent club Brighton)	
15 January 2025	CF	Joe Gelhardt (ENG)	Leeds United (ENG)	End of season	
23 January 2025	AM	Lincoln (BRA)	Fenerbahçe (TUR)	End of season	
29 January 2025	LW	Louie Barry (ENG)	Aston Villa (ENG)	End of season	

=== Loaned out ===
Date	Pos.	Player	To	Date until	Ref.
30 January 2024	RW	Will Jarvis (ENG)	Shelbourne (IRL)	6 August 2024 (Note: Jarvis had originally been loaned out until 13 November 2024, the end of the 2024 League of Ireland Premier Division season, but was recalled early)	
1 February 2024	AM	Yuriel Celi (PER)	Universitario (PER)	31 January 2025	
22 February 2024	CB	Jevon Mills (IRL)	Bohemians (IRL)	13 November 2024	
12 July 2024	CM	Callum Jones (WAL)	Morecambe (ENG)	End of Season	
29 July 2024	LB	James Furlong (IRE)	AFC Wimbledon (ENG)	End of Season	
2 August 2024	CF	Henry Sandat (ENG)	Wealdstone (ENG)	9 January 2025 (Note: On 9 January, Sandat was recalled from his loan with Wealdstone and subsequently joined Sutton permanently)	
5 August 2024	RB	Kyle Fanning (ENG)	Bridlington Town (ENG)	26 December 2024	
15 August 2024	LB	Brandon Fleming (ENG)	Doncaster Rovers (ENG)	9 January 2025 (Note: On 9 January, Fleming was recalled from his loan with Doncaster)	
17 August 2024	CM	Cameron Gray (ENG)	Barton Town (ENG)	23 October 2024	
21 August 2024	CB	Paul Iggulden (ENG)	Stocksbridge Park Steels (ENG)	20 September 2024	
23 August 2024	RW	Jaedyn Chibanga (ENG)	Grimsby Borough (ENG)	16 November 2024	
23 August 2024	CB	Alfie Taylor (ENG)	Grimsby Borough (ENG)	16 November 2024	
31 August 2024	CM	Sam Opoku (ITA)	Beverley Town (ENG)	28 September 2024	
12 October 2024	CF	Sincere Hall (BER)	Liversedge (ENG)	12 November 2024	
12 October 2024	RB	Kyle Fanning (ENG)	Liversedge (ENG)	12 November 2024	
25 October 2024	CM	Cameron Gray (ENG)	Brighouse Town (ENG)	23 November 2024	
23 December 2024	LB	Noah Wadsworth (ENG)	Chester (ENG)	20 January 2025	
26 December 2024	CB	Stan Ashbee (IRL)	Farsley Celtic (ENG)	23 January 2025	
26 December 2024	CB	Jack Leckie (ENG)	Farsley Celtic (ENG)	23 January 2025	
1 January 2025	CB	Kyle Fanning (ENG)	Matlock Town (ENG)	29 January 2025	
3 January 2025	AM	Marvin Mehlem (GER)	Paderborn 07 (GER)	End of season	
16 January 2025	CF	Stan Hewitt (ENG)	Liversedge (ENG)	13 February 2025	
17 January 2025	LB	Jake Leake (ENG)	Oldham Athletic (ENG)	End of season	
23 January 2025	LB	Ryan Giles (ENG)	Middlesbrough (ENG)	End of season	
29 January 2025	CF	Aidan Durkan (ENG)	Beverley Town (ENG)	26 February 2025	
31 January 2025	GK	Anthony Racioppi (SUI)	1. FC Köln (GER)	End of season	
1 February 2025	CB	Cathal McCarthy (IRL)	UCD (IRL)	End of season	
3 February 2025	DM	Xavier Simons (ENG)	Wycombe Wanderers (ENG)	End of season	
3 February 2025	CB	Andy Smith (ENG)	Gillingham (ENG)	End of season	
6 February 2025	RW	Jaedyn Chibanga (ENG)	North Ferriby (ENG)	6 March 2025	
10 February 2025	AM	Abdülkadir Ömür (TUR)	Çaykur Rizespor (TUR)	End of season	
11 February 2025	GK	Owen Foster (ENG)	Hartlepool United (ENG)	11 March 2025	
14 February 2025	LB	Brandon Fleming (ENG)	Forest Green Rovers (ENG)	End of season	
14 February 2025	CF	Tyrell Sellars-Fleming (ENG)	Gateshead (ENG)	End of season	
18 March 2025	CB	Alfie Taylor (ENG)	Cleethorpes Town (ENG)	End of season	
21 March 2025	GK	Thimothée Lo-Tutala (FRA)	Crawley Town (ENG)	28 March 2025	
22 March 2025	CB	Jack Leckie (ENG)	Chorley (ENG)	End of season	
27 March 2025	GK	Owen Foster (ENG)	Torquay United (ENG)	End of season	
27 March 2025	LB	Noah Wadsworth (ENG)	Boston United (ENG)	End of season	
28 March 2025	GK	Callum Yam (ENG)	Emley (ENG)	End of season	

=== Released / Out of Contract ===
Date	Pos.	Player	Subsequent club	Join date	Ref.
30 June 2024	DM	Olly Green (ENG)	Livingston (SCO)	1 July 2024 (Note: A compensation fee was still required for a cross-border transfer for a player under 23)	
30 June 2024	CF	Billy Sharp (ENG)	Doncaster Rovers (ENG)	1 July 2024	
30 June 2024	AM	Adama Traoré (MLI)	Amedspor (TUR)	1 July 2024	
30 June 2024	CB	Ajay Weston (ENG)	Bolton Wanderers (ENG)	2 July 2024	
30 June 2024	CM	Greg Docherty (SCO)	Charlton Athletic (ENG)	5 July 2024	
30 June 2024	AM	Jake Brown (ENG)	Grimsby Borough (ENG)	30 July 2024	
30 June 2024	RW	Vaughn Covil (USA)	Las Vegas Lights (USA)	9 August 2024	
30 June 2024	GK	David Robson (WAL)	Rochdale (ENG)	7 September 2024	
30 June 2024	CF	Aaron Connolly (IRL)	Sunderland (ENG)	24 September 2024	
30 June 2024	CM	Rajdeep Palit (ENG)	Barwell (ENG)	14 October 2024	
30 June 2024	RB	Cyrus Christie (IRL)	Swansea City (WAL)	1 November 2024	
30 June 2024	RB	Joseph Johnson (ENG)			
1 July 2024	DM	Ryan Woods (ENG)	Exeter City (ENG)	2 July 2024	
3 October 2024	CM	Sam Opoku (ITA)			
13 December 2024	CM	George Dickinson (ENG)			

== Pre-season and friendlies ==
On 12 June, Hull City confirmed two pre-season friendlies against Doncaster Rovers and Reading. Two weeks later, a home fixture versus Fiorentina was announced. A fourth friendly was later added, against Newcastle United. The team flew out to Istanbul on 10 July for the start of a 10-day warm-weather training camp. They would play a behind closed-doors friendly match against Kasımpaşa on 13 July. A further friendly would be played on 18 July against Fenerbahçe.

During mid-season, Hull announced a five-day training camp in Antalya along with a friendly against Alanyaspor during the October international break.

Win Draw Loss Fixtures

13 July 2024 Friendly	Kasımpaşa	1–1	Hull City	Riva, Istanbul
18:00 EEST (16:00 BST)	Kara 65'	Report	Hall 82'	Stadium: TFF Riva Facility; Attendance: 0 (behind-closed-doors)

18 July 2024 Friendly	Fenerbahçe	5–1	Hull City	Kadıköy, Istanbul
20:30 EEST (18:30 BST)	Džeko 38', 46'; Fred 44'; Szymański 52'; Yandaş 67'	Report	Hall 73'	Stadium: Şükrü Saracoğlu Stadium

23 July 2024 Friendly	Doncaster Rovers	4–0	Hull City	Doncaster, South Yorkshire
19:45 BST	Hurst 22'; Ironside 30'; Bailey 54', 59'	Report		Stadium: Eco-Power Stadium

27 July 2024 Friendly	Hull City	0–2	Newcastle United	Kingston upon Hull, East Riding of Yorkshire
14:00 BST		Report	Isak 32'; Murphy 43'	Stadium: MKM Stadium; Attendance: 13,670; Referee: Tom Nield

30 July 2024 Friendly	Hull City	2–2	Fiorentina	Kingston upon Hull, East Riding of Yorkshire
19:45 BST	Ömür 73'; Longman 80'	Report	Kean 29'; Dodô 52'	Stadium: MKM Stadium; Attendance: 5,455; Referee: Andrew Kitchen

3 August 2024 Friendly	Reading	2–0	Hull City	Reading, Berkshire
15:00 BST	Elliott 36'; Smith 53'	Report		Stadium: Madejski Stadium; Attendance: 2,368

11 October 2024 Friendly	Alanyaspor	0–2	Hull City	Alanya, Antalya
17:00 EEST; 15:00 BST		Report	Jacob 51'; Burstow 94'	Stadium: Alanya Oba Stadium

== Competitions ==
=== EFL Championship ===
On 26 June 2024, the Championship fixtures were announced.

Hull City started the season on 10 August 2024 with a home fixture against Bristol City, and finished it on 3 May 2025 with an away trip to Fratton Park to face Portsmouth. Both games ended in a 1–1 draw. Hull finished the season in 21st position, avoiding relegation on goal difference, with Luton Town being relegated in 22nd position.

==== League table ====
Pos	Team	Pld	W	D	L	GF	GA	GD	Pts	Promotion, qualification or relegation
19	Derby County	46	13	11	22	48	56	−8	50	
20	Preston North End	46	10	20	16	48	59	−11	50	
21	Hull City	46	12	13	21	44	54	−10	49	
22	Luton Town (R)	46	13	10	23	45	69	−24	49	Relegation to EFL League One
23	Plymouth Argyle (R)	46	11	13	22	51	88	−37	46	Relegation to EFL League One

Source: English Football League
Rules for classification: 1) Points; 2) Goal difference; 3) Number of goals scored; 4) Head-to-head results; 5) Wins; 6) Away goals; 7) Penalty points (sec 9.5); 8) Number of 12-point sending off offences; 9) Play-off (only if needed to determine promotion/relegation)
(R) Relegated

==== Results summary ====
Overall								Home						Away					
Pld	W	D	L	GF	GA	GD	Pts	W	D	L	GF	GA	GD	W	D	L	GF	GA	GD
46	12	13	21	44	54	−10	49	5	8	10	24	28	−4	7	5	11	20	26	−6

Last updated: 3 May 2025.
Source: Soccerway

==== Results by round ====
Round	1	2	3	4	5	6	7	8	9	10	11	12	13	14	15	16	17	18	19	20	21	22	23	24	25	26	27	28	29	30	32	33	34	31^{1}	35	36	37	38	39	40	41	42	43	44	45	46
Ground	H	A	H	A	H	A	H	A	A	H	H	A	H	A	H	A	H	A	H	H	A	H	A	A	H	H	A	H	A	H	A	H	A	A	H	A	H	A	H	A	A	H	A	H	H	A
Result	D	D	D	L	L	W	W	W	L	L	D	D	D	L	L	L	L	L	L	D	L	W	L	W	L	D	W	L	W	L	L	D	W	L	W	D	W	D	L	W	L	D	L	W	L	D
Position	14	17	14	19	22	13	12	9	13	14	15	15	15	18	19	22	22	22	24	24	24	21	22	21	22	22	21	22	19	21	22	21	20	21	19	19	18	19	19	19	19	20	20	20	22	21
Points	1	2	3	3	3	6	9	12	12	12	13	14	15	15	15	15	15	15	15	16	16	19	19	22	22	23	26	26	29	29	29	30	33	33	36	37	40	41	41	44	44	45	45	48	48	49

Source: Soccerway
A = Away; H = Home; W = Win; D = Draw; L = Loss; P = Postponed
Notes:
- ^{1} Matchday 31 (vs. Cardiff City) was postponed due to FA Cup involvements

==== Matches ====
Win Draw Loss Fixtures

10 August 2024 1	Hull City	1–1	Bristol City	Kingston upon Hull
12:30 BST	Estupiñán 90+1' (pen.)	Report	Williams (yellow card) 11'; Knight (yellow card) 62'; Mayulu 84'	Stadium: MKM Stadium; Attendance: 21,011; Referee: Keith Stroud

17 August 2024 2	Plymouth Argyle	1–1	Hull City	Plymouth
15:00 BST	Edwards (yellow card) 35'; Cissoko 52'; Forshaw (yellow card) 72'	Report	L. Coyle 63'; Millar (yellow card) 79'	Stadium: Home Park; Attendance: 16,306; Referee: Leigh Doughty

24 August 2024 3	Hull City	0–0	Millwall	Kingston upon Hull
12:30 BST	Mehlem (yellow card) 65'; L. Coyle (yellow card) 71'	Report	Tanganga (yellow card) 51'; Saville (yellow card) 63'	Stadium: MKM Stadium; Attendance: 20,009; Referee: David Webb
Note: Fixture was initially scheduled for a 15:00 kick-off, but was moved for live Sky Sports broadcast.

31 August 2024 4	Leeds United	2–0	Hull City	Leeds
15:00 BST	Rodon (yellow card) 29'; Joseph 63'; Gruev (yellow card) 79'; Piroe 81'	Report	Millar (yellow card) 57'	Stadium: Elland Road; Attendance: 36,517; Referee: Gavin Ward

13 September 2024 5	Hull City	0–2	Sheffield United	Kingston upon Hull
20:00 BST	Burns (yellow card) 45+1'	Report	Arblaster (yellow card) 7'; Hamer 15', (yellow card) 27'; McCallum 65'; Brooks (yellow card) 75'; Gilchrist (yellow card) 82'	Stadium: MKM Stadium; Attendance: 22,403; Referee: Peter Bankes
Note: Fixture was initially scheduled for 14 September, but was moved for live Sky Sports broadcast.

20 September 2024 6	Stoke City	1–3	Hull City	Stoke
20:00 BST	Wilmot 30', (yellow card) 87'; Gibson (yellow card) 63'; Tezgel (yellow card) 85'	Report	Palmer (penalty missed) 63', 63'; Slater 77'; Wilmot 79' (o.g.); Pandur (yellow card) 85'; Millar (yellow card) 89'	Stadium: Bet365 Stadium; Attendance: 23,366; Referee: Ben Toner
Note: Fixture was initially scheduled for 21 September, but was moved for live Sky Sports broadcast.

28 September 2024 7	Hull City	4–1	Cardiff City	Kingston upon Hull
15:00 BST	Belloumi 22', 35'; McLoughlin (yellow card) 28'; Zambrano 51'; Slater (yellow card) 70'; Mehlem (yellow card) 76'; Bedia 90+1' (pen.)	Report	Fish (yellow card) 13'; Robinson 18'; Collins (yellow card) 22'; O'Dowda (yellow card) 57'; Ng (yellow card) 75'	Stadium: MKM Stadium; Attendance: 22,665; Referee: Leigh Doughty
Note: The club's 120th anniversary match.

1 October 2024 8	Queens Park Rangers	1–3	Hull City	Shepherd's Bush
19:45 BST	Madsen 44' (pen.); Dixon-Bonner (yellow card) 88'	Report	Simons (yellow card) 17'; Drameh 25'; Bedia 36'; Jones (yellow card) 63'; McLoughlin (yellow card) 64'; Millar 71'	Stadium: Loftus Road; Attendance: 13,407; Referee: Thomas Kirk

5 October 2024 9	Norwich City	4–0	Hull City	Norwich
12:30 BST	Núñez 16'; Sargent 20', (penalty missed) 56'; Gordon 66', (yellow card) 90+4'; Schwartau (yellow card) 77'; Sainz 78'; McLean (yellow card) 90+5'	Report	Belloumi (yellow card) 14'; Drameh (yellow card) 57'; Pedro (yellow card) 76'; Coyle (yellow card) 90'	Stadium: Carrow Road; Attendance: 26,326; Referee: Tom Nield
Note: Fixture was initially scheduled for a 15:00 kick-off, but was moved for live Sky Sports broadcast.

20 October 2024 10	Hull City	0–1	Sunderland	Kingston upon Hull
15:00 BST	Jones (yellow card) 63'	Report	Isidor 63'; Roberts (yellow card) 83'	Stadium: MKM Stadium; Attendance: 23,072; Referee: Bobby Madley
Note: Fixture was initially scheduled for 19 October, but was moved for live Sky Sports broadcast. The match was for the 2024 Raich Carter Trophy.

23 October 2024 11	Hull City	1–1	Burnley	Kingston upon Hull
19:45 BST	Simons 45'	Report	Flemming 77'; Humphreys (yellow card) 90+4'	Stadium: MKM Stadium; Attendance: 20,168; Referee: Dean Whitestone
Note: Fixture was initially scheduled for 22 October, but was moved back 24 hours.

26 October 2024 12	Derby County	1–1	Hull City	Derby
15:00 BST	Brown 66'; Forsyth (yellow card) 90+4'	Report	Simons 57', (yellow card) 72'; Hughes (yellow card) 77'; Burstow (yellow card) 90+1'; Pedro (yellow card) 90+6'	Stadium: Pride Park Stadium; Attendance: 29,877; Referee: Tom Nield

2 November 2024 13	Hull City	1–1	Portsmouth	Kingston upon Hull
15:00 GMT	Pedro 11'; Hughes (yellow card) 65'	Report	Murphy 46'; Dozzell (yellow card) 53'; Ritchie (yellow card) 58'; Moxon (yellow card) 87'; Lang (yellow card) 90+7'	Stadium: MKM Stadium; Attendance: 21,904; Referee: Anthony Backhouse

5 November 2024 14	Oxford United	1–0	Hull City	Oxford
19:45 GMT	Brown (yellow card) 50' ter Avest 55'; Moore (yellow card) 58'	Report	Hughes (yellow card) 90'	Stadium: Kassam Stadium; Attendance: 10,213; Referee: Will Finnie

10 November 2024 15	Hull City	1–2	West Bromwich Albion	Kingston upon Hull
13:00 GMT	Pedro 40'; Omur (yellow card) 63'	Report	Grant 12'; Maja 17'; Furlong (yellow card) 35'; Styles (yellow card) 56'	Stadium: MKM Stadium; Attendance: 20,538; Referee: Andrew Kitchen
Note: Fixture was initially scheduled for 9 November, but was moved back 22 hours.

23 November 2024 16	Luton Town	1–0	Hull City	Luton
15:00 GMT	Burke (yellow card) 22'; McGuinness 33'; Nakamba (yellow card) 39'	Report	Coyle (yellow card) 37'	Stadium: Kenilworth Road; Attendance: 11,386; Referee: Thomas Bramall

26 November 2024 17	Hull City	0–2	Sheffield Wednesday	Kingston upon Hull
19:45 GMT	Hughes (yellow card) 45+3'	Report	Windass 37' (pen.); Ugbo (yellow card) 45+3'; Smith 81'	Stadium: MKM Stadium; Attendance: 21,297; Referee: Oliver Langford

30 November 2024 18	Middlesbrough	3–1	Hull City	Middlesbrough
12:30 GMT	Azaz 24'; Conway 41', 79'; Borges (yellow card) 46'	Report	Coyle (yellow card) 39'; Burstow 71'; McLoughlin (yellow card) 72'	Stadium: Riverside Stadium; Attendance: 24,121; Referee: Stephen Martin
Note: Fixture was initially scheduled for a 15:00 kick-off, but was moved for live Sky Sports broadcast.

7 December 2024 19	Hull City	0–1	Blackburn Rovers	Kingston upon Hull
15:00 GMT	Hughes (yellow card) 69'; Alzate (yellow card) 84'	Report	McLoughlin 20' (o.g.); Ohashi (yellow card) 70'; Beck (yellow card) 77'; Gueye (yellow card) 90+1'; Rankin-Costello (yellow card) 90+6'	Stadium: MKM Stadium; Attendance: 20,544; Referee: Thomas Kirk

11 December 2024 20	Hull City	1–1	Watford	Kingston upon Hull
19:45 GMT	Palmer (yellow card) 36'; Kamara (yellow card) 80'; Bedia 82'	Report	Louza (yellow card) 36'; Ngakia (yellow card) 43'; Ebosele (yellow card) 78'; Vata 88'	Stadium: MKM Stadium; Attendance: 18,694; Referee: Leigh Doughty

14 December 2024 21	Coventry City	2–1	Hull City	Coventry
12:30 GMT	Mason-Clark (yellow card) 42', (goal) 52'; Binks (yellow card) 54'; Torp (penalty missed) 66'; Bassette (yellow card) 69'; Rudoni 72'	Report	Pandur (yellow card) 32'; Pedro 44', (yellow card) 45+4'; Hughes (yellow card) 64'	Stadium: Coventry Building Society Arena; Attendance: 25,528; Referee: Robert Madley
Note: Fixture was initially scheduled for a 15:00 kick-off, but was moved for live Sky Sports broadcast.

21 December 2024 22	Hull City	2–1	Swansea City	Kingston upon Hull
12:30 GMT	João Pedro 34'; Coyle (yellow card) 43'; Puerta (yellow card) 75'; Burstow 80'; Simons (yellow card) 90+4'	Report	Darling 42'; Grimes (yellow card) 74'; Cullen (yellow card) 90+3'	Stadium: MKM Stadium; Attendance: 20,024; Referee: Thomas Bramall
Note: Fixture was initially scheduled for a 15:00 kick-off, but was moved for live Sky Sports broadcast.

26 December 2024 23	Preston North End	1–0	Hull City	Preston
15:00 GMT	Potts 60', (yellow card) 90+3'; Kesler-Hayden (yellow card) 84'; McCann (yellow card) 90+4'	Report	Slater (yellow card) 41'	Stadium: Deepdale; Attendance: 16,521; Referee: Josh Smith

29 December 2024 24	Blackburn Rovers	0–1	Hull City	Blackburn
15:00 GMT	Baker (yellow card) 69'; Beck (yellow card) 80'; Buckley (yellow card) 87'	Report	Longman 77'	Stadium: Ewood Park; Attendance: 16,245; Referee: Dean Whitestone

1 January 2025 25	Hull City	0–1	Middlesbrough	Kingston upon Hull
17:30 GMT	Vaughan (yellow card) 84'; Jones (yellow card) 87'	Report	Barlaser (yellow card) 14'; Gilbert 90+3'	Stadium: MKM Stadium; Attendance: 21,585; Referee: Leigh Doughty
Note: Fixture was initially scheduled for a 15:00 kick-off, but was moved for live Sky Sports broadcast.

4 January 2025 26	Hull City	3–3	Leeds United	Kingston upon Hull
15:00 GMT	Kamara 5', 89'; Pedro 81'	Report	Tanaka 46'; James 62'; Piroe 72'; Rodon (yellow card) 83'	Stadium: MKM Stadium; Attendance: 24,463; Referee: Anthony Backhouse

18 January 2025 27	Millwall	0–1	Hull City	Bermondsey, London
12:30 GMT	Honeyman (yellow card) 81'	Report	Cooper 58' (o.g.); Gelhardt (yellow card) 90+4'	Stadium: The Den; Attendance: 14,579; Referee: Stephen Martin
Note: Fixture was initially scheduled for a 15:00 kick-off, but was moved for live Sky Sports broadcasting.

21 January 2025 28	Hull City	1–2	Queens Park Rangers	Kingston upon Hull
19:45 GMT	Slater (yellow card) 43'; Pedro (yellow card) 73'; Gelhardt 84'; Jones (yellow card) 90+6'	Report	Morgan (yellow card) 52'; Paal 64'; Saito 70'	Stadium: MKM Stadium; Attendance: 19,180; Referee: Ben Speedie

24 January 2025 29	Sheffield United	0–3	Hull City	Sheffield, South Yorkshire
20:00 GMT		Report	Crooks 6'; Jacob 63', (yellow card) 82'; Slater (yellow card) 65'; Burrows 88' (o.g.)	Stadium: Bramall Lane; Attendance: 27,448; Referee: Andrew Kitchen
Note: Fixture was initially scheduled for 25 January, but was moved for live Sky Sports broadcasting.

1 February 2025 30	Hull City	1–2	Stoke City	Kingston upon Hull
15:00 GMT	Matazo 6'; Jacob (yellow card) 60'	Report	Al-Hamadi 43'; Moran 74'; Stevens (yellow card) 90+2'	Stadium: MKM Stadium; Attendance: 21,709; Referee: Will Finnie

12 February 2025 32	Burnley	2–0	Hull City	Burnley, Lancashire
19:45 GMT	Humphreys 3'; Flemming 21'	Report	Jones (yellow card) 41'	Stadium: Turf Moor; Attendance: 18,987; Referee: Sam Allison

15 February 2025 33	Hull City	1–1	Norwich City	Kingston upon Hull
15:00 GMT	Crooks 14'; McLoughlin (yellow card) 82'	Report	Sargent 47'; Doyle (yellow card) 56'; Wright (yellow card) 78'	Stadium: MKM Stadium; Attendance: 22,141; Referee: Ben Toner

22 February 2025 34	Sunderland	0–1	Hull City	Sunderland, Tyne and Wear
12:30 GMT		Report	Patterson 18' (o.g.); Matazo (yellow card) 45+1'; Pandur (yellow card) 74'; Egan (yellow card) 90+4'	Stadium: Stadium of Light; Attendance: 44,009; Referee: Farai Hallam
Note: Fixture was initially scheduled for a 15:00 kick-off, but was moved for live Sky Sports broadcasting.

25 February 2025 31	Cardiff City	1–0	Hull City	Leckwith, Cardiff
19:45 GMT	Robinson 52'; Mannsverk (yellow card) 81'; Robertson (yellow card) 90+2'	Report	Slater (yellow card) 50'; Crooks (yellow card) 81'	Stadium: Cardiff City Stadium; Attendance: 16,622; Referee: Thomas Kirk
Note: Fixture was initially scheduled for 8 February but was moved due to Cardiff's involvements in the FA Cup.

4 March 2025 35	Hull City	2–0	Plymouth Argyle	Kingston upon Hull
19:45 GMT	Hughes (yellow card) 36'; Gelhardt 48'; Kamara 61'	Report	Talovierov (yellow card) 16'; Puchacz (yellow card) 47'; Sorinola (yellow card) 88'	Stadium: MKM Stadium; Attendance: 18,772; Referee: Andy Davies
Note: Fixture was initially scheduled for 1 March, but was rearranged due to Plymouth's FA Cup involvements.

8 March 2025 36	Bristol City	1–1	Hull City	Ashton Gate, Bristol
15:00 GMT	Mehmeti 54' (pen.); Pring (yellow card) 58'	Report	Pedro 13', (red card) 14'; Jones (yellow card) 53'; Alzate (yellow card) 79'; Drameh (yellow card) 90+2'	Stadium: Ashton Gate; Attendance: 21,754; Referee: James Linington

12 March 2025 37	Hull City	2–1	Oxford United	Kingston upon Hull
19:45 GMT	Gelhardt (yellow card) 45+2', (goal) 73'; Puerta 76' (Note: Originally credited as an own goal by Jamie Cumming); Hughes (yellow card) 80'; Puerta (yellow card) 82' (yellow-red card) 90+7'	Report	Brown (yellow card) 45+2'; Helik 66'	Stadium: MKM Stadium; Attendance: 19,024; Referee: Josh Smith

15 March 2025 38	West Bromwich Albion	1–1	Hull City	West Bromwich
15:00 GMT	Price 67'; Bartley (yellow card) 81'	Report	Hughes (yellow card) 27'; Slater (yellow card) 36'; Palmer (yellow card) 73'; Gelhardt (yellow card) 74'; Kamara 79'; Jones (yellow card) 89'	Stadium: The Hawthorns; Attendance: 24,870; Referee: Jeremy Simpson

29 March 2025 39	Hull City	0–1	Luton Town	Kingston upon Hull
12:30 GMT		Report	Jones 46' (o.g.)	Stadium: MKM Stadium; Attendance: 23,005; Referee: Darren Bond
Note: Fixture was initially scheduled for a 15:00 kick-off, but was moved for live Sky Sports broadcasting.

5 April 2025 40	Sheffield Wednesday	0–1	Hull City	Sheffield, South Yorkshire
15:00 BST	Bannan (yellow card) 87'; Iorfa (yellow card) 90+3'	Report	Coyle (yellow card) 88'; Hughes 90+4'	Stadium: Hillsborough Stadium; Attendance: 27,342; Referee: Oliver Langford

8 April 2025 41	Watford	1–0	Hull City	Watford, Hertfordshire
19:45 BST	Sissoko (yellow card) 39', (goal) 55'; Kayembe (yellow card) 67'; Ince (yellow card) 90+1'	Report		Stadium: Vicarage Road; Attendance: 17,268; Referee: James Bell

14 April 2025 42	Hull City	1–1	Coventry City	Kingston upon Hull
20:00 BST	Kamara 82'	Report	Grimes 46'; Collins (yellow card) 76'	Stadium: MKM Stadium; Attendance: 21,659; Referee: Andrew Kitchen
Note: Fixture was initially scheduled for 12 April with a 15:00 kick-off, but was moved for live Sky Sports broadcasting.

18 April 2025 43	Swansea City	1–0	Hull City	Landore, Swansea
15:00 BST	Allen (yellow card) 27'; Vipotnik 51' (pen.); Fulton (yellow card) 72'	Report	McLoughlin (yellow card) 3'; Gelhardt (yellow card) 13'; Crooks (yellow card) 86' (yellow-red card) 90+1'	Stadium: Swansea.com Stadium; Attendance: 18,775; Referee: Ben Toner

21 April 2025 44	Hull City	2–1	Preston North End	Kingston upon Hull
15:00 BST	Gelhardt 50' (pen.), 67' (pen.)	Report	Gibson 34'; Þórðarson (yellow card) 66'; Frøkjær-Jensen (yellow card) 80'; Brady (yellow card) 90+2'	Stadium: MKM Stadium; Attendance: 22,103; Referee: Thomas Bramall

26 April 2025 45	Hull City	0–1	Derby County	Kingston upon Hull
15:00 BST	Jones (yellow card) 83'	Report	Langås (yellow card) 25'; Armstrong (yellow card) 39'; Phillips 84'	Stadium: MKM Stadium; Attendance: 24,451; Referee: Stephen Martin

3 May 2025 46	Portsmouth	1–1	Hull City	Portsmouth, Hampshire
12:30 BST	Saydee 55'	Report	McLoughlin (yellow card) 13'; Crooks 18', (yellow card) 44'	Stadium: Fratton Park; Attendance: 20,420; Referee: John Busby
Note: Fixture was initially scheduled for a 15:00 kick-off, but all EFL Championship final matchday fixtures were moved to an earlier kick-off.

=== FA Cup ===
The draw for the third round of the cup took place on 2 December 2024, with Hull City drawn at home against Doncaster Rovers.

Win Draw Loss Fixtures

12 January 2025 Third round	Hull City	1–1 (a.e.t.) (4–5 p)	Doncaster Rovers	Kingston upon Hull, East Riding of Yorkshire
12:00 GMT	Giles (yellow card) 55'; Puerta 80'; Rushworth (yellow card) 126'	Report	Olowu (yellow card) 36'; McGrath (yellow card) 45'; Molyneux 51'; Sbarra (yellow card) 57'; Clifton (yellow card) 65'; Bailey (yellow card) 78'; Sharman-Lowe (yellow card) 83'; Sterry (yellow card) 89'	Stadium: MKM Stadium; Attendance: 10,032; Referee: Sukhvir Gill
	Penalties
	João Pedro (penalty scored); McLoughlin (penalty scored); Coyle (penalty scored); Slater (penalty scored); Burstow (penalty missed); Jones (penalty missed)		(penalty missed) Ironside; (penalty scored) Sterry; (penalty scored) Gibson; (penalty scored) Close; (penalty scored) Molyneux; (penalty scored) Clifton

=== EFL Cup ===
The draw for the first round of the cup took place on 27 June 2024, with Hull City drawn at home against Sheffield Wednesday.

Win Draw Loss Fixtures

14 August 2024 First	Hull City	1–2	Sheffield Wednesday	Kingston upon Hull, East Riding of Yorkshire
19:45 BST	Mehlem 9'; McLoughlin (yellow card) 90+1'	Report	McNeill 1', 10'; Ihiekwe (yellow card) 36'; Valentín (yellow card) 86'	Stadium: MKM Stadium; Attendance: 9,281; Referee: Tom Nield

== Statistics ==
=== Appearances ===
As of match played 3 May 2025

Appearances shown after a "+" indicate player came on during course of the match
Players with no appearances are not included on the list
Italics indicate a loaned in player

No.	Pos	Nat	Player	Total		Championship		FA Cup		League Cup	
No.	Pos	Nat	Player	Apps	Goals	Apps	Goals	Apps	Goals	Apps	Goals
1	GK	(Croatia) CRO	Ivor Pandur	44	0	44+0	0	0+0	0	0+0	0
2	DF	(England) ENG	Lewie Coyle	46	1	42+2	1	0+1	0	0+1	0
3	DF	(England) ENG	Ryan Giles	18	0	11+5	0	1+0	0	1+0	0
4	DF	(England) ENG	Charlie Hughes	27	1	26+1	1	0+0	0	0+0	0
5	DF	(England) ENG	Alfie Jones	43	0	37+4	0	0+1	0	1+0	0
6	DF	(Republic of Ireland) IRL	Sean McLoughlin	39	0	37+0	0	1+0	0	1+0	0
7	FW	(Canada) CAN	Liam Millar	12	1	6+5	1	0+0	0	1+0	0
8	MF	(Germany) GER	Marvin Mehlem	17	1	9+7	0	0+0	0	1+0	1
10	MF	(Turkey) TUR	Abdülkadir Ömür	21	0	12+8	0	0+0	0	1+0	0
12	MF	(Italy) ITA	João Pedro	36	6	25+10	6	1+0	0	0+0	0
14	MF	(Republic of Ireland) IRL	Harry Vaughan	5	0	1+2	0	1+0	0	1+0	0
15	DF	(Republic of Ireland) IRL	John Egan	11	0	8+3	0	0+0	0	0+0	0
16	MF	(Brazil) BRA	Lincoln	11	0	4+7	0	0+0	0	0+0	0
17	DF	(England) ENG	Finley Burns	11	0	4+5	0	1+0	0	1+0	0
18	MF	(England) ENG	Xavier Simons	22	2	13+7	2	0+1	0	0+1	0
19	MF	(Colombia) COL	Steven Alzate	29	0	21+7	0	1+0	0	0+0	0
20	MF	(Colombia) COL	Gustavo Puerta	31	2	22+8	1	1+0	1	0+0	0
22	FW	(England) ENG	Louie Barry	4	0	2+2	0	0+0	0	0+0	0
23	DF	(England) ENG	Cody Drameh	29	1	17+11	1	1+0	0	0+0	0
24	MF	(England) ENG	Matt Crooks	18	3	9+9	3	0+0	0	0+0	0
25	MF	(Ecuador) ECU	Óscar Zambrano	8	1	5+3	1	0+0	0	0+0	0
26	DF	(England) ENG	Andy Smith	1	0	0+0	0	0+0	0	0+1	0
27	MF	(England) ENG	Regan Slater	46	1	36+8	1	1+0	0	1+0	0
28	FW	(Scotland) SCO	Kyle Joseph	16	0	13+3	0	0+0	0	0+0	0
29	DF	(England) ENG	Matty Jacob	8	1	4+4	1	0+0	0	0+0	0
30	FW	(England) ENG	Joe Gelhardt	20	5	19+1	5	0+0	0	0+0	0
31	GK	(Switzerland) SUI	Anthony Racioppi	1	0	0+0	0	0+0	0	1+0	0
33	FW	(Algeria) ALG	Mohamed Belloumi	10	2	10+0	2	0+0	0	0+0	0
36	MF	(Belgium) BEL	Eliot Matazo	6	1	4+2	1	0+0	0	0+0	0
37	FW	(Morocco) MAR	Nordin Amrabat	10	0	2+8	0	0+0	0	0+0	0
41	FW	(England) ENG	Tyrell Sellars-Fleming	5	0	0+4	0	0+0	0	1+0	0
44	FW	(England) ENG	Abu Kamara	37	5	25+11	5	1+0	0	0+0	0
45	MF	(Jamaica) JAM	Kasey Palmer	26	1	11+15	1	0+0	0	0+0	0
48	FW	(England) ENG	Mason Burstow	32	2	8+23	2	0+1	0	0+0	0
Player(s) who featured whilst on loan but returned to parent club during the season:
9	FW	(Ivory Coast) CIV	Chris Bedia	21	3	9+12	3	0+0	0	0+0	0
22	GK	(England) ENG	Carl Rushworth	3	0	2+0	0	1+0	0	0+0	0
Player(s) who featured but departed the club permanently during the season:
16	FW	(England) ENG	Ryan Longman	9	1	6+3	1	0+0	0	0+0	0
19	FW	(Colombia) COL	Óscar Estupiñán	3	1	2+0	1	0+0	0	0+1	0
24	MF	(Ivory Coast) CIV	Jean Michaël Seri	1	0	0+0	0	0+0	0	0+1	0
36	FW	(England) ENG	Will Jarvis	7	0	0+6	0	0+0	0	1+0	0

- Source: Compiled from competitive match reports

=== Top goalscorers ===
As of match played 3 May 2025

Player	Number	Position	Championship	FA Cup	League Cup	Total
(Italy) João Pedro	12	MF	6	0	0	6
(England) Joe Gelhardt	30	FW	5	0	0	5
(England) Abu Kamara	44	FW	5	0	0	5
(Ivory Coast) Chris Bedia	9	FW	3	0	0	3
(England) Matt Crooks	24	MF	3	0	0	3
(Algeria) Mohamed Belloumi	33	FW	2	0	0	2
(England) Mason Burstow	48	FW	2	0	0	2
(Colombia) Gustavo Puerta	20	MF	1	1	0	2
(England) Xavier Simons	18	MF	2	0	0	2
(England) Lewie Coyle	2	DF	1	0	0	1
(England) Cody Drameh	23	DF	1	0	0	1
(Colombia) Óscar Estupiñán	9	FW	1	0	0	1
(England) Charlie Hughes	4	DF	1	0	0	1
(England) Matty Jacob	29	DF	1	0	0	1
(England) Ryan Longman	16	FW	1	0	0	1
(Belgium) Eliot Matazo	36	MF	1	0	0	1
(Germany) Marvin Mehlem	8	MF	0	0	1	1
(Canada) Liam Millar	7	FW	1	0	0	1
(Jamaica) Kasey Palmer	45	MF	1	0	0	1
(England) Regan Slater	27	MF	1	0	0	1
(Ecuador) Óscar Zambrano	25	MF	1	0	0	1
Own goals			4	0	0	4
Total			44	1	1	46

=== Disciplinary record ===
As of match played 3 May 2025

Player	Number	Position	Championship		FA Cup		League Cup		Total	
Player	Number	Position	Yellow card	Red card	Yellow card	Red card	Yellow card	Red card	Yellow card	Red card
(Italy) João Pedro	12	MF	4	1	0	0	0	0	4	1
(Colombia) Gustavo Puerta	20	MF	3	1 (Note: For 2 yellow cards against Oxford United)	0	0	0	0	3	1
(England) Matt Crooks	24	MF	3	1 (Note: For 2 yellow cards against Swansea City)	0	0	0	0	3	1
(England) Charlie Hughes	4	DF	9	0	0	0	0	0	9	0
(England) Alfie Jones	5	MF	8	0	0	0	0	0	8	0
(England) Lewie Coyle	2	DF	7	0	0	0	0	0	7	0
(Republic of Ireland) Sean McLoughlin	6	DF	6	0	0	0	1	0	7	0
(England) Regan Slater	27	MF	6	0	0	0	0	0	6	0
(England) Joe Gelhardt	30	FW	4	0	0	0	0	0	4	0
(Canada) Liam Millar	7	FW	3	0	0	0	0	0	3	0
(Croatia) Ivor Pandur	1	GK	3	0	0	0	0	0	3	0
(England) Xavier Simons	18	MF	3	0	0	0	0	0	3	0
(Colombia) Steven Alzate	19	MF	2	0	0	0	0	0	2	0
(England) Cody Drameh	23	DF	2	0	0	0	0	0	2	0
(England) Matty Jacob	29	DF	2	0	0	0	0	0	2	0
(Germany) Marvin Mehlem	8	MF	2	0	0	0	0	0	2	0
(Jamaica) Kasey Palmer	45	MF	2	0	0	0	0	0	2	0
(Algeria) Mohamed Belloumi	33	FW	1	0	0	0	0	0	1	0
(England) Finley Burns	17	DF	1	0	0	0	0	0	1	0
(England) Mason Burstow	48	FW	1	0	0	0	0	0	1	0
(Republic of Ireland) John Egan	15	DF	1	0	0	0	0	0	1	0
(England) Ryan Giles	3	DF	0	0	1	0	0	0	1	0
(England) Abu Kamara	44	FW	1	0	0	0	0	0	1	0
(Belgium) Eliot Matazo	36	MF	1	0	0	0	0	0	1	0
(Turkey) Abdülkadir Ömür	10	MF	1	0	0	0	0	0	1	0
(England) Carl Rushworth	22	GK	0	0	1	0	0	0	1	0
(Republic of Ireland) Harry Vaughan	14	MF	1	0	0	0	0	0	1	0
Total			77	3	2	0	1	0	80	3

== Kits ==
As with the previous season, all of the club's kits for the 2024–25 season would be manufactured by Kappa. On 13 July 2024, the club announced that the home shirt would be a traditional black and amber striped pattern, with the shorts and socks black with amber trim. On 8 August 2024, the away kit was revealed. The shirt would be predominantly white but with black and amber patterning and trim, plus a traditional collar. The shorts and socks would be white with black trim. On 23 August 2024, the third kit was revealed. Taking inspiration from the 1992–93 and 2003–04 home kits, the third shirt would be amber with a faint "tiger stripe" pattern and a traditional black collar. The shorts and socks would both be amber too, with black trim.

== Awards ==
The annual awards for the club saw Ivor Pandur pick-up the Players' Player of the Year, Supporters' Player of the Year awards and Player of the Year, selected by head coach Rubén Sellés, awards. Charlie Hughes was presented with the Goal of the Season award for his stoppage-time goal against Sheffield Wednesday on 5 April 2025 in the 1–0 away win in the league. He also took the award for Young Player of the Year. The Frank Donoghue Academy Player of the Year award went to Harry Revill.
