= Jack Leckie (footballer) =

English footballer (born 2003)

Personal information
- Full name: Jack James Leckie
- Date of birth: 10 August 2003 (age 23)
- Place of birth: Newcastle, England
- Height: 1.98 m (6 ft 6 in)
- Position: Centre-back

Team information
- Current team: Gainsborough Trinity

Youth career
- 2016–2020: Newcastle United
- 2020–2022: Burnley
- 2022–2025: Hull City

Senior career*
Years	Team	Apps	(Gls)
2022–2025	Hull City	0	(0)
2023–2024	→ Farsley Celtic (loan)	6	(0)
2024–2025	→ Farsley Celtic (loan)	0	(0)
2025	→ Chorley (loan)	9	(0)
2025–2026	Alfreton Town	18	(0)
2026	→ Gainsborough Trinity (loan)	7	(1)
2026–	Gainsborough Trinity	13	(1)
- * Club domestic league appearances and goals as of 16:50, 16 August 2026 (UTC)

Jack James Leckie (born 10 August 2003) is an English professional footballer who plays as a centre-back for Gainsborough Trinity.

== Career ==
Leckie joined his boyhood club Newcastle United at the age of 13. He then completed a two-year scholarship with Burnley beginning in the 2020–21 season. Towards the end of the 2021–22 campaign, he joined Hull City on a trial period. After his Burnley scholarship ended in the summer of 2022, Leckie signed permanently for Hull on a two-year deal.

On 15 August 2023, he joined National League North club Farsley Celtic on a season-long loan. Having made six appearances for the side, he sustained an ankle injury that cut the loan short. On 30 June 2024, Leckie penned a new one-year contract with Hull, with the club holding the option of an additional year. Then, on 5 September, Leckie was named vice-captain of the U21s, alongside new captain George Dickinson. When Dickinson left the club on 13 December 2024, Leckie became his successor as captain. Less than two weeks later, on 26 December, he returned to Farsley on a month-long loan, arriving alongside Hull teammate Stan Ashbee. Leckie never featured in his second stint for the club, and on 20 March 2025, he was sent back out on loan, this time to Chorley for the remainder of the 2024–25 season. Following the campaign's conclusion, Leckie was released by Hull City.

Alfreton Town then signed Leckie on 24 July 2025, where he featured 18 times in the National League North for the Reds before he went out on loan to Gainsborough Trinity six months later. On 20 February 2026, Gainsborough announced that they had acquired Leckie permanently after a positive loan spell.
