= Tobias Loveland =

English association football coach

Toby Loveland
Personal information
- Full name: Tobias Loveland
- Date of birth: 27 March 1991 (age 35)

Managerial career
- Years: Team
- 2023–2024: Reading (first team coach)
- 2024–2025: Hull City (first team coach)
- 2025: Sheffield United (first team coach)

Tobias Loveland (born 27 March 1991) is an English association football coach.

== Career ==
=== Early career ===
Loveland spent four years at Bristol City before joining Southampton in 2018 as their Senior Technical Analyst.

=== Coaching career ===
When Rubén Sellés became Reading head coach on 26 June 2023, he chose to bring Loveland along with him, with the pair having worked together during Sellés' time in charge of Southampton. Instead of working as an analyst for the Royals, Loveland was hired as a first team coach. On 6 December 2024, EFL Championship club Hull City announced that Sellés was to become their new head coach following the Tigers' upcoming fixture against Blackburn Rovers. His appointment came with the news that both Loveland and James Oliver-Pearce would be following the Spaniard to his new club, as a first team coach and as assistant head coach, respectively. Loveland left Hull City on 15 May 2025, when the club parted company with Sellés. He then followed Sellés to Sheffield United that summer, before the coaching team were sacked on 14 September in reaction to a poor start to the 2025–26 season.
