= Owen Foster =

English footballer

Personal information
- Full name: Owen Jacob Anthony Foster
- Date of birth: 7 January 2005 (age 21)
- Place of birth: Kingston upon Hull, England
- Position: Goalkeeper

Team information
- Current team: Middlesbrough

Youth career
- Scunthorpe United

Senior career*
Years	Team	Apps	(Gls)
2022–2023	Scunthorpe United	13	(0)
2023–2025	Hull City	0	(0)
2024	→ Chorley (loan)	0	(0)
2025	→ Hartlepool United (loan)	0	(0)
2025	→ Torquay United (loan)	0	(0)
2025–	Middlesbrough	0	(0)
- * Club domestic league appearances and goals as of 14:51, 1 July 2025 (UTC)

Owen Jacob Anthony Foster (born 7 January 2005) is an English professional footballer who plays as a goalkeeper for club Middlesbrough.

== Playing career ==
=== Scunthorpe United ===
Born in Kingston upon Hull, Foster signed his first professional contract with Scunthorpe United on 1 April 2022. On 30 April 2022, Foster made his debut for Scunthorpe in a 1–1 draw against Hartlepool United and won the man of the match award. After the game, Scunthorpe boss Keith Hill backed Foster to go on to play for England. On the same day, he also received the club's Young Player of the Year award.

In September 2022, Foster went on trial with Premier League side Nottingham Forest. On 28 April 2023, it was announced that Foster had won Scunthorpe's Young Player of the Year award for the second consecutive season.

=== Hull City ===
On 3 July 2023, Foster signed for his hometown club, EFL Championship side Hull City for an undisclosed fee. On 9 February 2024, Foster joined National League North club Chorley on a one-month loan deal. On 11 February 2025, Foster joined National League club Hartlepool United on a month-long loan spell. On 27 March 2025, Foster joined Torquay United on loan until the end of the season.

=== Middlesbrough ===
On 1 July 2025, Foster joined Championship side Middlesbrough on a one-year deal.

== Personal life ==
Foster attended St Mary's College in Hull.

== Career statistics ==
As of match played 10 February 2024

Appearances and goals by club, season and competition
Club	Season	League			FA Cup		EFL Cup		Other		Total	
Club	Season	Division	Apps	Goals	Apps	Goals	Apps	Goals	Apps	Goals	Apps	Goals
Scunthorpe United	2021–22	League Two	2	0	0	0	0	0	0	0	2	0
Scunthorpe United	2022–23	National League	11	0	0	0	0	0	1 (Note: Appearance in FA Trophy)	0	12	0
Scunthorpe United	Total		13	0	0	0	0	0	1	0	14	0
Hull City	2023–24	Championship	0	0	0	0	0	0	0	0	0	0
Hull City	2024–25	Championship	0	0	0	0	0	0	0	0	0	0
Hull City	Total		0	0	0	0	0	0	0	0	0	0
Chorley	2023–24	National League North	0	0	0	0	0	0	1	0	1	0
Hartlepool United	2024–25	National League	0	0	0	0	0	0	0	0	0	0
Career total			13	0	0	0	0	0	2	0	15	0

== Honours ==
Individual

- Scunthorpe United Young Player of the Year: 2021–22, 2022–23
