= Ivor Pandur =

Croatian footballer (born 2000)

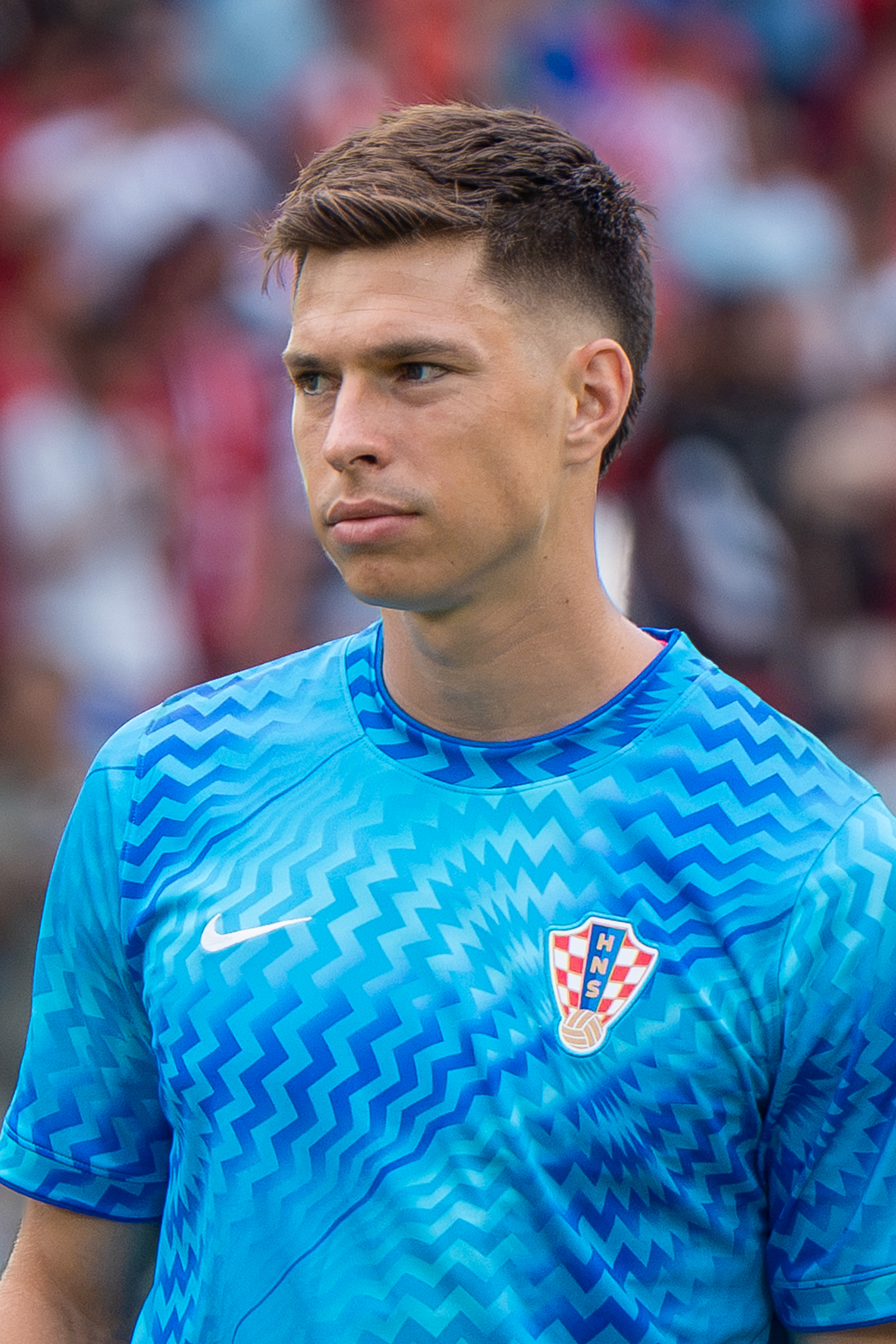
- Pandur with Croatia in 2026

Personal information
- Full name: Ivor Pandur
- Date of birth: 25 March 2000 (age 26)
- Place of birth: Rijeka, Croatia
- Height: 1.87 m (6 ft 2 in)
- Position: Goalkeeper

Team information
- Current team: Rangers
- Number: 1

Youth career
- 2011–2019: Rijeka

Senior career*
Years	Team	Apps	(Gls)
2019–2020	Rijeka	20	(0)
2020–2023	Hellas Verona	7	(0)
2022–2023	→ Fortuna Sittard (loan)	31	(0)
2023–2024	Fortuna Sittard	16	(0)
2024–2026	Hull City	89	(0)
2026–	Rangers	12	(0)

International career
2015	Croatia U15	2	(0)
2016–2017	Croatia U17	4	(0)
2018	Croatia U18	1	(0)
2017–2019	Croatia U19	6	(0)
2019–2021	Croatia U20	2	(0)
2021	Croatia U21	4	(0)
2026–	Croatia	0	(0)
- * Club domestic league appearances and goals as of 21:24, 7 November 2026 (UTC)

Ivor Pandur (born 25 March 2000) is a Croatian professional footballer who plays as a goalkeeper for Scottish Premiership club Rangers and the Croatia national team.

== Club career ==
=== Rijeka ===
Pandur made his professional debut for Rijeka in October 2019 in a cup tie against Buje. He then made his league debut on 14 December 2019, playing the full 90 minutes of a 3–1 victory over Varaždin.

=== Hellas Verona ===
On 31 August 2020, Pandur signed with Italian Serie A club Hellas Verona a five-year contract. He made his debut on 28 October in a Coppa Italia tie with Venezia that ended 3–3 after extra time, with Verona progressing thanks to Pandur saving two penalties in the shoot-out. He made his league debut on 9 May 2021 in a 1–1 draw with Torino.

=== Fortuna Sittard ===
On 7 July 2022, Pandur agreed to a one-season loan with option to buy at Eredivisie club Fortuna Sittard. He made his debut on 27 August, taking over the starting job from Yanick van Osch in a 2–1 league loss to SC Heerenveen. He remained a starter throughout the season for Fortuna.

On 28 April 2023, the club exercised their purchase option and signed Pandur to a four-year contract, starting from 1 July.

=== Hull City ===
On 20 January 2024, Pandur signed a three-and-a-half-year deal with EFL Championship side Hull City for an undisclosed fee, rumoured to be around €2,000,000. After nearly eight months at the club, on 10 August, he made his debut in the opening game of the 2024–25 season, a 1–1 home draw with Bristol City. Pandur became the Tigers' starting goalkeeper for the remainder of the campaign, with his performances often garnering praise. In particular, in a match against Coventry City on 14 April 2025, he was cited as the sole reason Hull earned a 1–1 draw amidst their fight for league survival. He won the Player of the Match award as a result of his efforts. Ultimately, the team survived relegation on the final day, and Pandur received further acclaim for his role in the achievement. On 6 May, the club announced that the Croatian had won the Player of the Year award, Players' Player of the Year award, and Supporters' Player of the Year award for the 2024–25 season.

That summer, several clubs expressed an interest in buying Pandur. Links to West Ham United were initially thought to be true, however they were eventually reported to be "wide of the mark". Elsewhere, Middlesbrough expressed a genuine desire to sign the 25-year-old, but they were unwilling to meet Hull's asking price of £5,000,000. A transfer to Leicester City was also briefly discussed, as was a move to German side Werder Bremen, whilst a return to northeastern Italy with Parma was considered less likely. In the end, Pandur remained in East Yorkshire for the upcoming 2025–26 season, later stating that he had always planned to stay with Hull, regardless of any interest from other clubs. The return of football saw Pandur struggle amid the news of his possible departure. Although overall results were good, Hull's leaky defence had conceded 16 goals in their first nine games of the campaign, with a home match on 30 September against Preston North End proving to be a personal nadir for the Croatian. The visitors scored twice in the opening 10 minutes, with Pandur at fault for the second goal. Having saved an effort from Lewis Gibson, he cleared the ball straight to Ben Whiteman, who set up Michael Smith to score into a scarcely defended net. Despite his poor performances up to that point, Pandur returned to his expected standard on 4 October, saving a late penalty from Harrison Burrows to secure an important 1–0 home win over Sheffield United.

=== Rangers ===
On 30 June 2026, Rangers announced the signing of Pandur on a four-year deal.

== International career ==
Pandur was capped several times by Croatia at youth level. On 22 September 2025, he was named as a standby member of the senior squad for fixtures against the Czech Republic and Gibraltar. The following month, Pandur announced his hopes of being selected for the 2026 FIFA World Cup. Then, on 10 November, he received his first senior call-up for upcoming qualifiers against the Faroe Islands and Montenegro.

On 18 May 2026, Pandur was selected in the 26-man squad for the 2026 FIFA World Cup.

== Career statistics ==
As of match played 7 November 2026

Appearances and goals by club, season and competition
Club	Season	League			National cup (Note: Includes Croatian Football Cup, Coppa Italia, KNVB Cup)		League cup (Note: Includes Scottish League Cup)		Europe		Other		Total	
Club	Season	Division	Apps	Goals	Apps	Goals	Apps	Goals	Apps	Goals	Apps	Goals	Apps	Goals
Rijeka	2019–20	HNL	18	0	4	0	—		—		—		22	0
Rijeka	2020–21	HNL	2	0	0	0	—		—		—		2	0
Rijeka	Total		20	0	4	0	—		—		—		24	0
Hellas Verona	2020–21	Serie A	4	0	2	0	—		—		—		6	0
Hellas Verona	2021–22	Serie A	3	0	2	0	—		—		—		5	0
Hellas Verona	Total		7	0	4	0	—		—		—		11	0
Fortuna Sittard (loan)	2022–23	Eredivisie	29	0	0	0	—		—		—		29	0
Fortuna Sittard	2023–24	Eredivisie	16	0	2	0	—		—		—		18	0
Fortuna Sittard	Fortuna Sittard total		45	0	2	0	—		—		—		47	0
Hull City	2023–24	EFL Championship	0	0	—		—		—		—		0	0
Hull City	2024–25	EFL Championship	44	0	0	0	0	0	—		—		44	0
Hull City	2025–26	EFL Championship	45	0	0	0	0	0	—		3 (Note: Appearances in EFL Championship play-offs)	0	48	0
Hull City	Total		89	0	0	0	0	0	—		3	0	92	0
Rangers	2026–27	Scottish Premiership	12	0	0	0	3	0	4 (Note: Two appearances in UEFA Europa League, two appearances in UEFA Conference League)	0	—		19	0
Career total			173	0	10	0	3	0	4	0	3	0	193	0

== Honours ==
Rijeka

- Croatian Football Cup: 2019–20

Hull City

- EFL Championship play-offs: 2026

Individual

- Eredivisie Team of the Month: October 2022, August 2023
- Hull City Player of the Year: 2024–25
- Hull City Players' Player of the Year: 2024–25
- Hull City Supporters' Player of the Year: 2024–25
