= Anthony Racioppi =

Swiss footballer (born 1998)

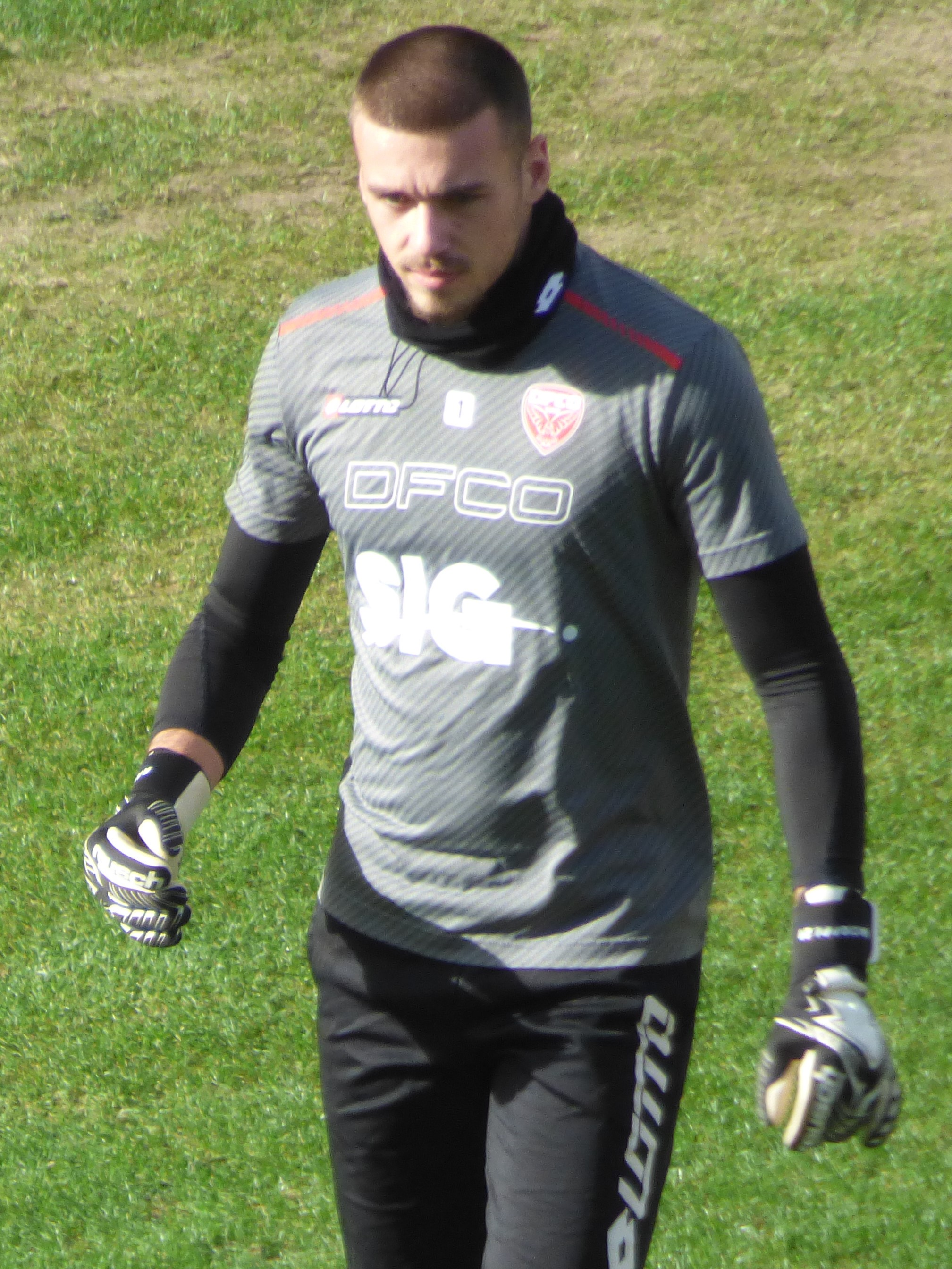
- Racioppi with Dijon in 2021

Personal information
- Full name: Anthony Alexandro Racioppi
- Date of birth: 31 December 1998 (age 27)
- Place of birth: Geneva, Switzerland
- Height: 1.88 m (6 ft 2 in)
- Position: Goalkeeper

Team information
- Current team: Sion
- Number: 1

Youth career
- 2007–2012: CS Chênois
- 2012–2016: Lyon

Senior career*
Years	Team	Apps	(Gls)
2016–2020	Lyon II	41	(0)
2018–2020	Lyon	0	(0)
2020–2022	Dijon	23	(0)
2022–2024	Young Boys	40	(0)
2024–2025	Hull City	0	(0)
2025	→ 1. FC Köln (loan)	0	(0)
2025	→ 1. FC Köln II (loan)	1	(0)
2025–	Sion	47	(0)

International career^{‡}
2017–2019	Switzerland U20	10	(0)
2018–2021	Switzerland U21	13	(0)
- * Club domestic league appearances and goals as of 28 September 2026 ‡ National team caps and goals as of 15:36, 4 June 2023 (UTC)

Anthony Alexandro Racioppi (born 31 December 1998) is a Swiss professional footballer who plays as a goalkeeper for Sion.

== Club career ==
Racioppi made his professional debut for the French club Dijon on 8 October 2020 in a Ligue 1 game against Metz. On 10 January 2022, Racioppi signed a three-and-a-half-year deal with Swiss club Young Boys.

On 8 August 2024, Racioppi signed a three-year deal with EFL Championship club Hull City. He made his debut for the club just a few days later, on 14 August 2024, in Hull's 2–1 home defeat to Sheffield Wednesday in the first round of the EFL Cup.

On 31 January 2025, Racioppi moved to 1. FC Köln in German 2. Bundesliga on loan with an option to buy.

On 25 June 2025, Racioppi returned to Switzerland to join Swiss Super League side Sion for an undisclosed fee.

== International career ==
Born in Switzerland, Racioppi is of Italian descent through his father from Naples, and holds dual French-Swiss citizenship after years living in France. Considered as one of Switzerland's brightest prospects in his position, he had already stood out on the international stage thanks to his performances with the Switzerland U21 squad.

== Career statistics ==
As of match played 14 August 2024

Appearances and goals by club, season and competition
Club	Season	League			National cup (Note: Includes Coupe de France, Swiss Cup)		League cup (Note: Includes EFL Cup)		Other		Total	
Club	Season	Division	Apps	Goals	Apps	Goals	Apps	Goals	Apps	Goals	Apps	Goals
Lyon II	2016–17	Championnat National 2	2	0	—		—		—		2	0
Lyon II	2017–18	Championnat National 2	13	0	—		—		—		13	0
Lyon II	2018–19	Championnat National 2	13	0	—		—		—		13	0
Lyon II	2019–20	Championnat National 2	13	0	—		—		—		13	0
Lyon II	Total		41	0	—		—		—		41	0
Dijon	2020–21	Ligue 1	21	0	0	0	—		—		21	0
Dijon	2021–22	Ligue 2	2	0	2	0	—		—		4	0
Dijon	Total		23	0	2	0	—		—		25	0
Young Boys	2021–22	Swiss Super League	5	0	0	0	—		—		5	0
Young Boys	2022–23	Swiss Super League	19	0	3	0	—		1 (Note: Appearances in UEFA Conference League)	0	23	0
Young Boys	2023–24	Swiss Super League	16	0	1	0	—		7 (Note: Appearances in UEFA Champions League)	0	24	0
Young Boys	Total		40	0	4	0	—		8	0	52	0
Hull City	2024–25	Championship	0	0	0	0	1	0	—		1	0
Career total			104	0	6	0	1	0	8	0	119	0

== Honours ==
Young Boys

- Swiss Super League: 2022–23
- Swiss Cup: 2022–23

1.FC Koln

- 2.Bundesliga: 2024–25

Individual

- Swiss Super League Team of the Year: 2025–26
