= Noah Wadsworth =

English footballer (born 2005)

Personal information
- Full name: Noah John Michael Wadsworth
- Date of birth: 26 January 2005 (age 21)
- Position: Defender

Team information
- Current team: Buxton

Youth career
- Bradford City

Senior career*
Years	Team	Apps	(Gls)
2022–2024	Bradford City	2	(0)
2023	→ Tadcaster Albion (loan)	11	(0)
2023–2024	→ Farsley Celtic (loan)	11	(2)
2024–2026	Hull City	0	(0)
2024–2025	→ Chester (loan)	4	(0)
2025	→ Boston United (loan)	3	(0)
2025–2026	→ Scarborough Athletic (loan)	8	(0)
2026–	Buxton	1	(0)
- * Club domestic league appearances and goals as of 14:30, 25 May 2026 (UTC)

Noah John Michael Wadsworth (born 26 January 2005) is an English professional footballer who plays as a defender for National League North club Buxton.

== Career ==
Wadsworth began his career with Bradford City, and moved on loan to Tadcaster Albion in February 2023. He turned professional in July 2023, alongside Freddy Jeffreys and Sam Bentley. He moved on loan to Farsley Celtic in November 2023, The loan was extended in December 2023, before Wadsworth was recalled by Bradford City in February 2024, impressing manager Graham Alexander.

He was released by Bradford City at the end of the 2023–24 season. Alexander explained the decision, saying that whilst Wadsworth had made progress, it was not as much as the club was expecting. After Wadsworth left Bradford, his younger brother Gabe joined the club's first-team.

On 3 July 2024, Wadsworth signed a one-year contract with Hull City. In December 2024 he signed on loan for Chester. In March 2025 he signed on loan for Boston United. He was offered a new contract by Hull at the end of the 2024–25 season.

On 22 November 2025, Wadsworth moved to Scarborough Athletic on a month-long loan spell.

He was released by Hull at the end of the 2025–26 season.

On 8 August 2026, Wadsworth joined National League North club Buxton.

== Personal life ==
His younger brother Gabe Wadsworth is also a footballer for Bradford City.

== Career statistics ==
As of match played 3 January 2026

Appearances and goals by club, season and competition
Club	Season	League			FA Cup		EFL Cup		Other		Total	
Club	Season	Division	Apps	Goals	Apps	Goals	Apps	Goals	Apps	Goals	Apps	Goals
Bradford City	2022–23	League Two	0	0	0	0	0	0	0	0	0	0
Bradford City	2023–24	League Two	2	0	0	0	0	0	0	0	2	0
Bradford City	Total		2	0	0	0	0	0	0	0	2	0
Tadcaster Albion (loan)	2022–23	Northern Premier League East Division	11	0	0	0	0	0	0	0	11	0
Farsley Celtic (loan)	2023–24	National League North	11	2	0	0	0	0	1 (Note: Appearance in the FA Trophy.)	0	12	2
Hull City	2024–25	Championship	0	0	0	0	0	0	0	0	0	0
Hull City	2025–26	Championship	0	0	0	0	0	0	0	0	0	0
Hull City	Total		0	0	0	0	0	0	0	0	0	0
Chester (loan)	2024–25	National League North	4	0	0	0	0	0	0	0	4	0
Boston United (loan)	2024–25	National League	3	0	0	0	0	0	0	0	3	0
Scarborough Athletic (loan)	2025–26	National League North	8	0	0	0	0	0	0	0	8	0
Career total			39	2	0	0	0	0	1	0	40	2
