= Freddy Jeffreys =

English footballer

Personal information
- Date of birth: 25 August 2005 (age 21)
- Height: 5 ft 7 in (1.70 m)
- Position: Midfielder

Team information
- Current team: Delaware Fightin' Blue Hens

Youth career
- Colton Juniors
- 2012–2023: Bradford City

College career
Years	Team	Apps	(Gls)
2025–	Delaware Fightin' Blue Hens	16	(1)

Senior career*
Years	Team	Apps	(Gls)
2023–2024	Bradford City	0	(0)
2024	→ Elgin City (loan)	6	(1)
2025	Garforth Town	12	(1)
- * Club domestic league appearances and goals as of 22:18, 26 November 2025 (UTC)

Freddy Jeffreys (born 25 August 2005) is an English professional footballer who plays as a midfielder for the Delaware Fightin' Blue Hens.

== Career ==
Jeffreys began his career with Colton Juniors, before being scouted by Bradford City at the age of 7. He agreed a two-year scholarship in May 2021, and was linked with a transfer to Premier League clubs Fulham and Southampton in June 2022. He turned professional with Bradford City in the summer of 2023, alongside Noah Wadsworth and Sam Bentley.

He was called up to the Bradford City first team squad for the first time on 10 October 2023, making his senior debut as a substitute in the EFL Trophy. After making a second EFL Trophy appearance, he moved on loan to Scottish club Elgin City in February 2024. He scored his first senior goal for the club, before later suffering a hamstring injury. Jeffreys returned to Bradford to undertake rehabilitation, being offered a short-term contract.

After spending time with Garforth Town, Jeffreys began playing college soccer for Delaware Fightin' Blue Hens.

== Career statistics ==
As of match played on 23 March 2024

Appearances and goals by club, season and competition
Club	Season	League			National Cup		League Cup		Other		Total	
Club	Season	Division	Apps	Goals	Apps	Goals	Apps	Goals	Apps	Goals	Apps	Goals
Bradford City	2023–24	EFL League Two	0	0	0	0	0	0	2 (Note: Appearances in EFL Trophy.)	0	2	0
Elgin City (loan)	2023–24	Scottish League Two	6	1	0	0	0	0	0	0	6	1
Garforth Town	2024–25	Northern Premier League	12	1	0	0	0	0	0	0	12	1
Career total			18	1	0	0	0	0	2	0	20	1
