= Julian Hübner =

German football manager (born 1983)

Personal information
- Full name: Julian Hübner
- Date of birth: 31 December 1983 (age 42)

Team information
- Current team: Holstein Kiel (assistant)

Managerial career
- Years: Team
- 2014–2015: Karlsruher SC U19 (assistant)
- 2016: Karlsruher SC U17 (assistant)
- 2016–2019: Karlsruher SC Youth
- 2021: SV Rülzheim
- 2021–2024: Hamburger SV (assistant)
- 2024: Hull City (assistant)
- 2026–: Holstein Kiel (assistant)

Julian Hübner (born 31 December 1983) is a German association football coach who works as assistant coach of 2. Bundesliga club Holstein Kiel.

== Coaching career ==
Hübner spent his early coaching career working within the academy of Karlsruher SC before later becoming the head coach of SV Rülzheim.

=== Hamburger SV ===
On 13 June 2021, Hübner was announced alongside Filip Tapalović as the assistants of the newly appointed Tim Walter at Hamburger SV. Hübner had previously worked with Walter at Karlsruher SC within their youth setup. He would leave Die Rothosen upon Walter's sacking, on 12 February 2024, having failed to get them promoted back to the Bundesliga after several seasons in charge.

=== Hull City ===
On 4 July 2024, EFL Championship side Hull City announced that both Hübner and Tapalović would follow Walter to England to become the Tigers' new assistant head coaches, after the latter's appointment earlier that summer. Following Walter's sacking on 27 November 2024, they all left the club.

=== Holstein Kiel ===
Walter became head coach of 2. Bundesliga side Holstein Kiel on 24 February 2026, and was joined there by Hübner.

== Personal life ==
Hübner is from Oberotterbach, Rhineland-Palatinate. He lives with his family in nearby Bad Bergzabern.
