= Yeboah Amankwah =

English footballer

Personal information
- Full name: Yeboah Amankwah
- Date of birth: 19 October 2000 (age 26)
- Place of birth: London, England
- Position: Defender

Team information
- Current team: Inter Turku
- Number: 30

Youth career
- Kinetic Academy
- 2016–2020: Manchester City

Senior career*
Years	Team	Apps	(Gls)
2020–2022	Manchester City	0	(0)
2020	→ Rochdale (loan)	0	(0)
2021–2022	→ Accrington Stanley (loan)	24	(0)
2022–2025	Lommel	46	(0)
2026	IFK Mariehamn	12	(0)
2026–	Inter Turku	10	(0)
- * Club domestic league appearances and goals as of 12 November 2026

Yeboah Amankwah (born 19 October 2000) is an English professional footballer who plays as a defender for Inter Turku.

== Career ==
Born in London, Amankwah joined Manchester City from Croydon based charity Kinetic Academy in December 2016. He joined League One side Rochdale in September 2020 on a loan to the end of the 2020–21 season. He made his professional debut on 8 September in a 2–1 EFL Trophy win at Morecambe, playing the first 72 minutes of the match. A week later he played the entirety of a 2–0 home defeat to Sheffield Wednesday in the EFL Cup, but sustained a knee injury in the match that saw him recalled from his loan the following month.

He moved on loan to Accrington Stanley in August 2021.

Amankwah signed for Lommel in September 2022.

On 31 January 2026, Amankwah joined Veikkausliiga side IFK Mariehamn on a free transfer, having left Lommel the previous summer. On 21 July 2026, he joined league rivals Inter Turku on a deal until the end of 2026 with an option to extend.
