= Sincere Hall =

Bermudian footballer (born 2004)

Personal information
- Full name: Sincere Kymani Hall
- Date of birth: 12 June 2004 (age 22)
- Height: 1.77 m (5 ft 10 in)
- Positions: Forward; attacking midfielder

Youth career
- 2017–2019: West Ham United
- 2019–2021: Kinetic Academy
- 2021–2025: Hull City

Senior career*
Years	Team	Apps	(Gls)
2021–2025	Hull City	0	(0)
2023–2024	→ Guiseley (loan)	1	(0)
2024	→ Liversedge (loan)	5	(0)

International career^{‡}
2021	Bermuda U20	3	(1)
2023	Bermuda	2	(0)
- * Club domestic league appearances and goals as of 16:05, 19 August 2025 (UTC) ‡ National team caps and goals as of 16:08, 8 August 2024 (UTC)

Sincere Kymani Hall (born 12 June 2004) is a Bermudian professional footballer who most recently played for Premier League club Hull City. As a forward and as a attacking midfielder, he has represented Bermuda at both youth and senior level.

== Club career ==
=== Hull City ===
Hall moved to England when he was 13, and after spending time at West Ham United in their youth academy, he joined the Kinetic Academy in South London. On 28 August 2021, Hall signed for Hull City having trialled for their U18 side in the 2020–21 season.

On 23 December 2023, Northern Premier League Premier Division side Guiseley loaned Hall on a one-month deal. After returning from loan, he signed a one-year contract extension at Hull on 30 June 2024. On 12 October 2024, Hall went out on a month-long loan spell to Liversedge.

Following the conclusion of the 2024–25 season, Hall was released by Hull City.

== International career ==
Hall scored in his second match for the Bermuda U20s on 8 November 2021 in the 3–0 win over Saint Vincent and the Grenadines. On 25 March 2023, he made his debut for the senior side, a 2–0 loss against Guyana.

== Personal life ==
On 14 April 2026, it was reported that Hall had co-founded a football youth academy in Bermuda alongside Ajani Burchall and Remy Coddington.

== Career statistics ==
=== International ===
As of match played 8 August 2024

Appearances and goals by national team and year
National team	Year	Apps	Goals
Bermuda	2023	2	0
Total		2	0
