= James Oliver-Pearce =

English association football coach

Personal information
- Date of birth: 23 October 1991 (age 35)

Team information
- Current team: Sønderjyske (assistant)

Managerial career
- Years: Team
- 2021–2023: AFC Wimbledon (first team coach)
- 2023–2024: Reading (first team coach)
- 2024–2025: Hull City (assistant)
- 2025: Sheffield United (assistant)
- 2026–: Sønderjyske (assistant)

James Oliver-Pearce (born 23 October 1991) is an English professional football coach for Danish Superliga club Sønderjyske.

He has previously held coaching positions with AFC Wimbledon, Reading, Hull City and Sheffield United.

== Coaching career ==
=== AFC Wimbledon ===
In 2012, Oliver-Pearce got his first major coaching role, joining AFC Wimbledon as an academy coach. Ahead of the 2014–15 season, he was promoted to assistant head coach of the U18s. A year later, he became the head coach of the U16s, before being appointed head coach of the U18s in 2021. Under Mark Robinson, he earned his place amongst the first team coaching staff. After Robinson was sacked as Wimbledon's head coach, Mark Bowen became interim manager and kept Oliver-Pearce in his role.

=== Reading ===
When Bowen returned to Reading, becoming their Head of Football Operations, he brought Oliver-Pearce with him to serve in the club's first team coaching staff under Paul Ince. Ince was sacked on 11 April 2023, however new interim manager Noel Hunt kept Oliver-Pearce in his role, as did Ince's eventual replacement, Rubén Sellés, when he became Reading's head coach on 26 June 2023.

=== Hull City and Sheffield United ===
On 6 December 2024, Sellés was appointed head coach of Hull City, and brought in Oliver-Pearce alongside him as his assistant. Tobias Loveland also joined the pair from Reading as a first team coach. The trio began their new roles on 9 December 2024. He left Hull City on 15 May 2025, when the club parted company with Sellés. The following month, Oliver-Pearce was appointed as assistant manager at Sheffield United when Sellés' arrived at the club. He left after Sellés' was dismissed on 14 September 2025.

=== Sønderjyske ===
On 1 August 2026, Oliver-Pearce was hired by Danish Superliga side Sønderjyske as the club's new assistant coach.
