= Kinetic Foundation =

Registered charity in the United Kingdom

Kinetic Foundation is a registered charity based in London, England, which combines football and education of young people.

== History ==
Kinetic Foundation was founded after the 2011 England riots by former Crystal Palace coach Harry Hudson and James Fotheringham. The academy provides its players an education, mandatory volunteer opportunities, and opportunities to play for an American college on scholarships.

In January 2026, former Kinetic Foundation coach Calum McFarlane became interim head coach of Premier League side Chelsea, following the firing of Enzo Maresca. Following Chelsea's appointment of Liam Rosenior as head coach on 6 January 2026, Calum McFarlane was appointed as a first-team coach, and Kinetic co-founder Harry Hudson was appointed as U21s Head Coach.

== Graduates ==
The following are graduates of Kinetic:

- (Bermuda) Sincere Hall
- (England) Yeboah Amankwah
- (England) Wesley Fonguck
- (England) Ryan Galvin
- (England) Myles Kenlock
- (England) Ali Koiki
- (England) Ricky Korboa
- (England) Nico Lawrence
- (England) Kamarl Grant
- (England) Omar Richards
- (Germany) Kwadwo Baah
- (Nigeria) Joe Aribo
- (Nigeria) Josh Maja
- (Romania) Kevin Ciubotaru
- (Wales) Rhys Norrington-Davies
