= Tim Walter =

German football manager (born 1975)

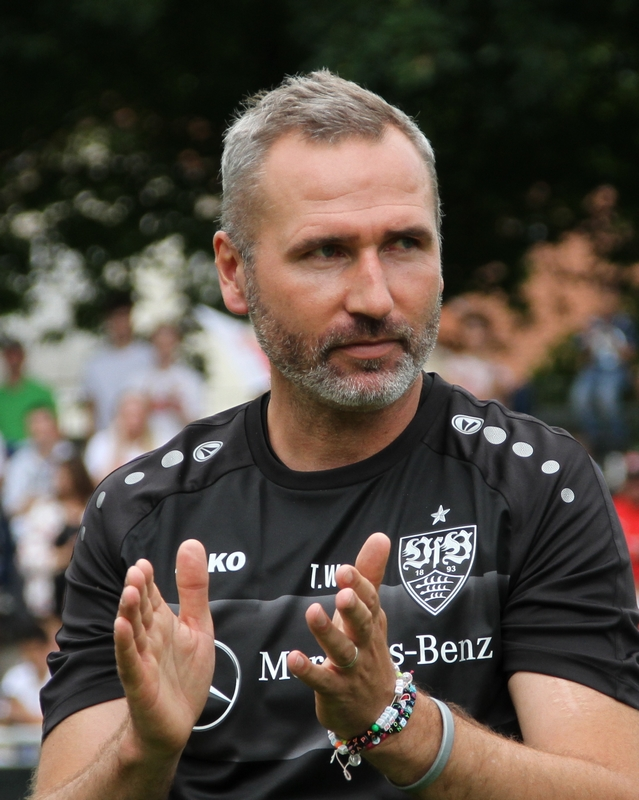
- Walter in 2019

Personal information
- Full name: Tim Laszlo Walter
- Date of birth: 8 November 1975 (age 51)
- Place of birth: Bruchsal, West Germany
- Position: Attacking midfielder

Senior career*
Years	Team	Apps	(Gls)
- SG Dielheim
1999–2002	ASV Durlach		
- FC Heidelsheim

Managerial career
- 2017–2018: Bayern Munich II
- 2018–2019: Holstein Kiel
- 2019: VfB Stuttgart
- 2021–2024: Hamburger SV
- 2024: Hull City
- 2026: Holstein Kiel
- * Club domestic league appearances and goals

Tim Laszlo Walter (born 8 November 1975) is a German football manager, who last coached Holstein Kiel.

== Playing career ==
Born in Bruchsal, Walter played amateur football for SG Dielheim, ASV Durlach and FC Heidelsheim, mainly as an attacking midfielder.

== Coaching career ==
=== Early career ===
After retiring, Walter began his coaching career with Karlsruher SC in 2006, being an assistant of Markus Kauczinski in the under-19 team. He took over the under-15s in the following year, before moving to the under-17s in 2013, and to the under-19s in 2014.

On 7 July 2015, Bayern Munich paid Karlsruhe a € 200,000 fee to sign Walter, who was named manager of their under-17 team. On 17 May 2017, he was appointed manager of Bayern's reserve team.

=== Holstein Kiel ===
On 24 May 2018, Walter was appointed manager of 2. Bundesliga side Holstein Kiel, replacing departed Markus Anfang. His first professional match in charge occurred on 3 August, a 3–0 away win over Hamburger SV.

Walter led Holstein Kiel to a 6th-place finish in the 2018–19 2. Bundesliga, eight points shy of a play-off qualification.

=== Stuttgart ===
In June 2019, Walter became the new head coach of VfB Stuttgart also in the second division. He was sacked on 23 December, despite having his team on the third position.

=== Hamburger SV ===
On 25 May 2021, after more than a year without a club, Walter was named the new head coach of fellow 2. Bundesliga side Hamburger SV. He lost promotion in the play-offs in his first two seasons, and was sacked in February 2024.

=== Hull City ===
On 31 May 2024, Walter was appointed head coach of EFL Championship side Hull City on a three-year deal. He managed his first competitive game with the Tigers on 10 August 2024, the opening fixture of the 2024–25 season, a 1–1 home draw with Bristol City. Having gone 1–0 down with six minutes to go, Óscar Estupiñán scored the club's first goal under Walter's stewardship, a well-converted penalty in added-time. On 27 November 2024, with the club sitting in 22nd position and without a win in 9 games, Walter was relieved from his role as manager following a 2-0 defeat to Sheffield Wednesday, despite chairman Acun Ilıcalı stating he would remain in the job no matter the outcome of the game.

=== Holstein Kiel ===
On 24 February 2026, Walter was appointed manager of 2. Bundesliga side Holstein Kiel, replacing departed Marcel Rapp. He was sacked in November 2026.

== Managerial statistics ==
As of match played 7 November 2026

Managerial record by team and tenure
Team	From	To	Record								Ref
Team	From	To	G	W	D	L	GF	GA	GD	Win %	Ref
Bayern Munich II	1 July 2017	25 May 2018	36	22	8	6	84	41	+43	61.11	
Holstein Kiel	25 May 2018	23 May 2019	37	15	10	12	65	54	+11	40.54	
VfB Stuttgart	23 May 2019	23 December 2019	20	11	4	5	33	25	+8	55.00	
Hamburger SV	1 July 2021	12 February 2024	104	51	28	25	202	141	+61	49.04	
Hull City	31 May 2024	27 November 2024	18	3	6	9	18	25	−7	16.67	
Holstein Kiel	24 February 2026	9 November 2026	24	7	8	9	30	29	+1	29.17	
Career total			239	109	64	66	431	315	+116	45.61	—
