= Stan Ashbee =

Association football player (born 2006)

Personal information
- Full name: Stanley Luca Ashbee
- Date of birth: 28 November 2006 (age 19)
- Place of birth: Kingston upon Hull, England
- Height: 1.87 m (6 ft 2 in)
- Position: Centre midfielder

Team information
- Current team: Hull City
- Number: 43

Youth career
- Hull City

Senior career*
Years	Team	Apps	(Gls)
2023–	Hull City	0	(0)
2024–2025	→ Farsley Celtic (loan)	3	(0)

International career^{‡}
2022	Republic of Ireland U16	2	(1)
2022–2023	Republic of Ireland U17	6	(0)
2023	Republic of Ireland U18	2	(0)
2023–2025	Republic of Ireland U19	11	(1)
- * Club domestic league appearances and goals as of 17:20, 13 March 2025 (UTC) ‡ National team caps and goals as of 12:49, 13 May 2025 (UTC)

Stanley Luca Ashbee (born 28 November 2006) is a professional footballer who plays as a centre-back for Premier League club Hull City. Born in England, he has represented the Republic of Ireland at youth level.

== Club career ==
Having come through the club's academy ranks, Ashbee signed his first professional contract with Hull City on 7 December 2023. On 16 January 2024, he made his first team debut in a third round replay in the FA Cup. Away at Birmingham City, Ashbee would play the opening 80 minutes before being substituted in the 2–1 defeat.

On 30 April 2024, Ashbee was named the Frank Donoghue Academy Player of the Year at Hull City for the second consecutive season.

On 26 December 2024, he joined National League North club Farsley Celtic on a one-month-loan. He made 3 appearances for the club during his loan spell.

== International career ==
Although born and raised in England, Ashbee qualifies for the Ireland through his Irish heritage. His first call-up for the Republic of Ireland was on 6 April 2022 for the U16s.

In February 2023, Ashbee was called up to the U17s for the first time. Two months later, he made one appearance at the 2023 UEFA European Under-17 Championship, in Ireland's opening game against Poland, a 5–1 defeat.

In March 2024, Ashbee debuted for the U19s in two games against Slovakia, nearly scoring in both matches. He finally netted his first goal for the U19s in a 4–0 win over Azerbaijan on 16 November 2024.

== Personal life ==
Ashbee is the son of former Cambridge United and Hull City midfielder Ian Ashbee.

== Career statistics ==
As of match played 4 January 2025

Appearances and goals by club, season and competition
Club	Season	League			FA Cup		League Cup		Other		Total	
Club	Season	Division	Apps	Goals	Apps	Goals	Apps	Goals	Apps	Goals	Apps	Goals
Hull City	2023–24	Championship	0	0	1	0	0	0	—		1	0
Hull City	2024–25	Championship	0	0	0	0	0	0	—		0	0
Hull City	Total		0	0	1	0	0	0	0	0	1	0
Farsley Celtic (loan)	2024–25	National League North	3	0	—		—		—		3	0
Career total			3	0	1	0	0	0	0	0	4	0

== Honours ==
Individual

- Frank Donoghue Academy Player of the Year: 2022–23
- Frank Donoghue Academy Player of the Year: 2023–24
