= Erbil Bozkurt =

English footballer and coach (born 1990)

- Bozkurt in 2026

Personal information
- Full name: Erbil Bozkurt
- Date of birth: 4 April 1990 (age 36)
- Place of birth: Hackney, England
- Position: Goalkeeper

Team information
- Current team: Hull City (goalkeeping coach)

Senior career*
Years	Team	Apps	(Gls)
–2016	Haringey Borough		
2016–2017	Hampton & Richmond Borough	0	(0)
2017	Leyton Orient	0	(0)
2017–2018	Boreham Wood	0	(0)
- * Club domestic league appearances and goals

Erbil Bozkurt (born 4 April 1990) is an English professional football coach and former player who is the goalkeeping coach of Premier League club Hull City.

== Coaching career ==
Bozkurt began his coaching career whilst playing for Hampton & Richmond Borough. He was appointed as the academy goalkeeping coach at Leyton Orient on 1 February 2016. Bozkurt held this position until 1 April 2017, when he became the club's senior goalkeeping coach.

On 7 August 2017, he moved as a player-coach to Boreham Wood. Bozkurt retired as a player on 18 January 2018, when he left his position as goalkeeping coach at Boreham Wood for the equivalent U21 position at EFL Championship side Queens Park Rangers. He would be promoted to the role of first team goalkeeping coach on 4 June 2020, ahead of the restart of football following the COVID-19 pandemic. On 4 February 2023, Bozkurt would leave QPR for Wycombe Wanderers in what would be a brief spell that lasted under a month. On 30 June 2023, he became the goalkeeping coach of MK Dons under manager Graham Alexander.

On 5 July 2024, Hull City appointed Bozkurt as their first team goalkeeping coach. As a result of a touchline fight with Peter Murphy during Hull's 3–0 win over Preston North End on 20 January 2026, Bozkurt was sent off and later received a one-match ban and £1,000 fine. Murphy, who was also sent off, was punished with a one-match ban and a £2,000 fine.

== Personal life ==
Bozkurt is of Turkish descent, and holds a UEFA A licence in goalkeeping.
