= Óscar Estupiñán =

Colombian footballer (born 1996)

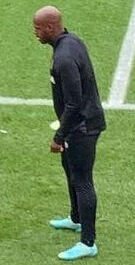
- Estupiñán with Hull City in 2022

Personal information
- Full name: Óscar Eduardo Estupiñán Vallesilla
- Date of birth: 29 December 1996 (age 29)
- Place of birth: Cali, Colombia
- Height: 1.87 m (6 ft 2 in)
- Position: Striker

Team information
- Current team: Juárez
- Number: 19

Youth career
- Once Caldas

Senior career*
| Years | Team | Apps | (Gls) |
| 2015–2017 | Once Caldas | 58 | (18) |
| 2017–2020 | Vitória de Guimarães B | 20 | (11) |
| 2017–2022 | Vitória de Guimarães | 65 | (24) |
| 2019 | → Barcelona SC (loan) | 9 | (5) |
| 2019–2020 | → Denizlispor (loan) | 28 | (7) |
| 2022–2024 | Hull City | 41 | (14) |
| 2023–2024 | → Metz (loan) | 6 | (0) |
| 2024 | → Bahia (loan) | 11 | (3) |
| 2024– | Juárez | 68 | (30) |

International career
| 2022– | Colombia | 1 | (0) |
- * Club domestic league appearances and goals as of 05:45, 28 September 2026 (UTC)

Óscar Eduardo Estupiñán Vallesilla (Spanish pronunciation: [ˈoskaɾ estupiˈɲan]; born 29 December 1996) is a Colombian professional footballer who plays as a striker for Liga MX club Juárez.

== Club career ==
=== Once Caldas ===
Born in Cali, Estupiñán began his career at Once Caldas. He made his Categoría Primera A debut on 16 May 2015 against Uniautónoma, as a 77th-minute substitute for Sebastián Penco in a 2–2 away draw, and scored his only goal of the season on 26 September in the second minute of a 1–1 home draw with Envigado.

Estupiñán scored 13 goals in 2016, including two on 13 February in a 4–0 home win over Jaguares de Córdoba.

=== Vitória de Guimarães ===
On 5 June 2017, Estupiñán became Vitória de Guimarães' first signing of the summer, on an undisclosed contract. He made his debut on 5 August in the Supertaça Cândido de Oliveira, replacing Paolo Hurtado for the final nine minutes of a 3–1 loss to S.L. Benfica at the Estádio Municipal de Aveiro. His first season was split between the first team in the Primeira Liga and the reserves in the second tier; his sole goal of the season for the former was on 5 May 2018 to conclude a 4–1 win at C.D. Tondela, within a minute of leaving the bench.

Having made 14 league appearances and scored once in 18 months at Vitória, Estupiñán returned to South America in January 2019 on loan to Barcelona S.C. in Ecuador. In July that year, he was lent to Denizlispor for the Turkish Süper Lig season.

Upon returning to Vitória, Estupiñán became the starting centre forward ahead of Brazilian Bruno Duarte. In 2021–22, new manager Pepa experimented with playing them in tandem. With 15 goals in 28 games, he finished joint fifth among the league's top scorers.

=== Hull City ===
On 13 July 2022, Estupiñán signed a three-year deal with Hull City. He made his debut on 30 July in a 2–1 home win against Bristol City. He opened his account when he scored both goals in the 2–1 home win against Norwich City on 13 August. Two weeks later, Estupiñán scored a hat-trick in a 3–2 home win against Coventry City, his first for the Tigers. On 13 September, Estupiñán was awarded the EFL Championship Player of the Month award for August having scored seven goals across the month.

On 1 September 2023, Estupiñán moved to FC Metz on a season-long loan, but on 1 February 2024, Estupiñán was recalled by Hull. On 9 February 2024, he moved on loan to Esporte Clube Bahia for the rest of the season. On 9 July 2024, Estupiñán was recalled from his loan at Esporte Clube Bahia. On 10 August 2024, Estupiñán marked his return to Hull by scoring an added-time penalty to equalise against Bristol City on the opening day of the 2024–25 season.

=== Juárez ===
A few weeks later, on 29 August 2024, he left permanently to join Liga MX club Juárez for an undisclosed fee.

== International career ==
In June 2022, Estupiñán was called up to the Colombia national team for the first time. The call-up came following his impressive goal return in the 2021–22 Primeira Liga season in which he netted 15 times in 28 appearances ranking as one of the League's top goalscorers.

== Career statistics ==
As of match played on 17 August 2024

Appearances and goals by club, season and competition
| Club | Season | League | | | State league (Note: Includes Campeonato Baiano) | | National cup (Note: Includes Copa Colombia, Taça de Portugal, Turkish Cup, FA Cup, Copa do Brasil) | | League cup (Note: Includes Taça da Liga, EFL Cup) | | Other | | Total | |
| Club | Season | Division | Apps | Goals | Apps | Goals | Apps | Goals | Apps | Goals | Apps | Goals | Apps | Goals |
|---|---|---|---|---|---|---|---|---|---|---|---|---|---|---|
| Once Caldas | 2014 | Categoría Primera A | 0 | 0 | — | | 1 | 0 | — | | — | | 1 | 0 |
| Once Caldas | 2015 | Categoría Primera A | 10 | 1 | — | | 3 | 1 | — | | — | | 13 | 2 |
| Once Caldas | 2016 | Categoría Primera A | 34 | 13 | — | | 3 | 0 | — | | — | | 37 | 13 |
| Once Caldas | 2017 | Categoría Primera A | 14 | 4 | — | | 4 | 0 | — | | — | | 18 | 4 |
| Once Caldas | Total | | 58 | 18 | — | | 11 | 1 | — | | — | | 69 | 19 |
| Vitória de Guimarães B | 2017–18 | LigaPro | 19 | 10 | — | | — | | — | | — | | 19 | 10 |
| Vitória de Guimarães B | 2018–19 | LigaPro | 0 | 0 | — | | — | | — | | — | | 0 | 0 |
| Vitória de Guimarães B | 2019–20 | Campeonato de Portugal | 1 | 1 | — | | — | | — | | — | | 1 | 1 |
| Vitória de Guimarães B | Total | | 20 | 11 | — | | — | | — | | — | | 20 | 11 |
| Vitória de Guimarães | 2017–18 | Primeira Liga | 10 | 1 | — | | 0 | 0 | 1 | 0 | 3 (Note: Two appearances in UEFA Europa League, one appearance in Supertaça Cândido de Oliveira) | 0 | 14 | 1 |
| Vitória de Guimarães | 2018–19 | Primeira Liga | 4 | 0 | — | | 3 | 0 | 0 | 0 | 0 | 0 | 7 | 0 |
| Vitória de Guimarães | 2019–20 | Primeira Liga | 0 | 0 | — | | 0 | 0 | 0 | 0 | 0 | 0 | 0 | 0 |
| Vitória de Guimarães | 2020–21 | Primeira Liga | 23 | 8 | — | | 0 | 0 | 1 | 1 | 0 | 0 | 24 | 9 |
| Vitória de Guimarães | 2021–22 | Primeira Liga | 28 | 15 | — | | 1 | 0 | 4 | 1 | 0 | 0 | 33 | 16 |
| Vitória de Guimarães | Total | | 65 | 24 | — | | 4 | 0 | 6 | 2 | 3 | 0 | 78 | 26 |
| Barcelona SC (loan) | 2019 | Ecuadorian Serie A | 9 | 5 | — | | 0 | 0 | — | | 2 (Note: Appearances in Copa Libertadores) | 0 | 11 | 5 |
| Denizlispor (loan) | 2019–20 | Süper Lig | 28 | 7 | — | | 5 | 7 | — | | — | | 33 | 14 |
| Hull City | 2022–23 | Championship | 35 | 13 | — | | 1 | 0 | 1 | 0 | — | | 38 | 13 |
| Hull City | 2023–24 | Championship | 4 | 0 | — | | 0 | 0 | 1 | 1 | — | | 5 | 1 |
| Hull City | 2024–25 | Championship | 2 | 1 | — | | 0 | 0 | 1 | 0 | — | | 3 | 1 |
| Hull City | Total | | 41 | 14 | — | | 1 | 0 | 3 | 1 | — | | 46 | 15 |
| FC Metz (loan) | 2023–24 | Ligue 1 | 6 | 0 | — | | 0 | 0 | — | | — | | 6 | 0 |
| Bahia (loan) | 2024 | Série A | 11 | 3 | 4 | 3 | 2 | 1 | — | | 2 (Note: Appearances in Copa do Nordeste) | 1 | 21 | 8 |
| Career total | | | 229 | 76 | 4 | 3 | 23 | 9 | 9 | 3 | 7 | 1 | 272 | 92 |

== Honours ==
Individual

- EFL Championship Player of the Month: August 2022
