= Rubén Sellés =

Spanish football manager

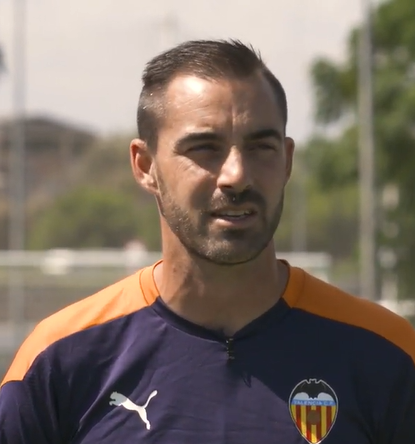
- Sellés in 2020

Personal information
- Full name: Rubén Sellés Salvador
- Date of birth: 15 June 1983 (age 43)
- Place of birth: Valencia, Spain

Team information
- Current team: AEK Larnaca (manager)

Youth career
- Years: Team
- 1999–2001: Parreta
- 2001–2002: Burjassot

Managerial career
- 2003–2008: University of Valencia
- 2022: Southampton (caretaker)
- 2023: Southampton
- 2023–2024: Reading
- 2024–2025: Hull City
- 2025: Sheffield United
- 2025–2026: Zaragoza
- 2026–: AEK Larnaca

Rubén Sellés Salvador (born 15 June 1983) is a Spanish professional football manager who is currently the manager of AEK Larnaca.

Sellés has a Master's degree in Sports & Physiology from the University of Valencia, where he also coached of the university's football team, and graduated from the UEFA Pro Licence programme at the age of 25.

He has managed Southampton, Reading, Hull City and Sheffield United in England, Zaragoza in his native Spain, and also has coaching experience in Greece, Russia, Azerbaijan, and Denmark.

== Playing career ==
Born in Marxalenes, a neighborhood in Valencia, Sellés played for local side Parreta before finishing his playing career with Burjassot.

== Coaching career ==
At the age of 16, Sellés was already coaching the youth sides of Parreta. In 2002, Sellés entered the University of Valencia and became a coach of the university's football team; he led the club to a promotion from the Segunda Regional in their first senior season, and kept the club in the Primera Regional in the following campaigns.

At the start of the 2008–09 season, Sellés joined a host of compatriots at Greek side Aris Thessaloniki, being an assistant fitness coach. He departed in 2009 to perform a similar role for the Juvenil squad of Villarreal.

In 2010, Sellés travelled to Russia, acting as assistant manager to Igor Lediakhov at Shinnik Yaroslavl. He later worked as Óscar Fernández's assistant at Asteras Tripolis and Gandía, before joining Neftçi; he remained an assistant manager there for two seasons, under managers Boyukagha Hajiyev, Arif Asadov, Nazim Suleymanov and Tarlan Ahmadov.

Sellés moved to Norwegian club Strømsgodset in 2015, working as Chief Data Analyst, before returning to Azerbaijan as an assistant of Gurban Gurbanov at Qarabağ. In July 2018, he joined Danish club Aarhus, assisting manager David Nielsen for two seasons.

In July 2020, Sellés returned to his hometown after being appointed manager of Valencia's Juvenil B squad. On 1 January 2021, he returned to Denmark and joined Copenhagen as assistant manager to Jess Thorup.

== Managerial career ==
=== Southampton ===
On 10 June 2022, Sellés departed Copenhagen to join Premier League club Southampton, as assistant to Ralph Hasenhüttl. On 7 November, Hasenhüttl was sacked by Southampton, and Sellés was placed in caretaker charge of the club. Sellés took charge of one match for The Saints before the appointment of new manager Nathan Jones, a 1–1 draw against Sheffield Wednesday in the EFL Cup on 9 November – in which Southampton advanced to the next round after a penalty shootout.

He again took temporary charge of the team after Jones was sacked in February 2023. His first game in charge was a 1–0 away victory over Chelsea. On 24 February, Sellés was appointed manager until the end of the 2022–23 season. On 24 May, Southampton confirmed that they would not renew his contract when it expired at the end of the season. On 28 May, Sellés managed his final game at Southampton; a 4–4 draw against Liverpool on the final day of the league season. In his three months in charge, he oversaw the relegation of Southampton to the EFL Championship, having won just two games in 17 matches.

=== Reading ===
On 26 June 2023, Reading announced an agreement with Sellés to become their new first team manager, subject to a successful work visa application; his appointment was confirmed on 14 July. His first professional game in charge was a 0–1 defeat to Peterborough; his first victory came in the following match when Reading beat Millwall 0–4 away in the EFL Cup.

=== Hull City ===
On 6 December 2024, Sellés was announced as the new head coach of Hull City on a two-and-a-half year contract, with the option for a third, in the place of the dismissed Tim Walter. In his first match in charge, he drew 1–1 to Watford, before going on to seal a 2–1 victory over Swansea City on home turf, gaining the Tigers their first win in 14 matches. In their first FA Cup match under his leadership, they lost 5–4 on penalties, after a 1–1 draw to Doncaster Rovers, exiting in the competition’s third round. On 15 May 2025, despite getting Hull City to safety, he was dismissed from his role.

=== Sheffield United ===
On 18 June 2025, Sellés was announced as the new manager of Sheffield United on a three-year contract. The team made a poor start to the season, losing all of their opening five league matches of the season, a run which included a 5–0 away defeat to winless Ipswich Town. On 14 September, the club announced they had sacked Sellés.

=== Zaragoza ===
On 20 October 2025, Sellés was appointed manager of Real Zaragoza, who were at the bottom of the Segunda División. The following 2 March, he was dismissed.

=== AEK Larnaca ===
On 25 August 2026, Sellés was appointed head coach of AEK Larnaca on a one-year contract.

== Managerial statistics ==
As of match played 22 November 2026

Managerial record by team and tenure
Team	From	To	Record				
Team	From	To	P	W	D	L	Win %
Southampton (caretaker)	7 November 2022	10 November 2022	1	0	1	0	0.00
Southampton	12 February 2023	28 May 2023	17	2	4	11	11.76
Reading	26 June 2023	6 December 2024	78	34	18	26	43.59
Hull City	6 December 2024	15 May 2025	28	9	8	11	32.14
Sheffield United	18 June 2025	14 September 2025	6	0	0	6	0.00
Zaragoza	20 October 2025	2 March 2026	20	5	6	9	25.00
AEK Larnaca	25 August 2026	Present	11	8	2	1	72.73
Total			161	58	39	64	36.02
