= 1932–33 Hull City A.F.C. season =

English football club season

Hull City
1932–33 season
- Manager: Haydn Green
- Stadium: Anlaby Road
- Third Division North: 1st (promoted)
- FA Cup: Third round
- Top goalscorer: League: Bill McNaughton (41); All: Bill McNaughton (42)
Home colours

The 1932–33 season was the 29th season in the history of Hull City Association Football Club and their third consecutive season in the Third Division North. In addition to the domestic league, the club would also participate in the FA Cup.

== Summary ==
Hull won their first-ever league title in 1932–33. Under the stewardship of manager Haydn Green, the Tigers were crowned champions of the Third Division North. The acquisition of centre forward Bill McNaughton prior to the campaign proved to be a decisive factor in their success. Paired in attack with Russell Wainscoat, the former Gateshead striker notched 41 goals in the league.

Consequently, McNaughton set a number of club records this campaign that still stand today. His 41 goals in 41 league appearances, and 42 goals across all competitions, are still yet to be beaten. Furthermore, he remains the only Hull City player to ever score a hat-trick in back-to-back games, which he achieved in October 1932 in league fixtures against Southport and Barnsley. In the latter match, he also netted four goals. Regardless of McNaughton's achievements, the season is also notable for the Tigers' victory over Stalybridge Celtic in the first round of the FA Cup. Running out 8–2 winners at Bower Fold, the result is the biggest away win in the club's history.

== Competitions ==
=== Third Division North ===
==== League table ====
Pos	Team	Pld	W	D	L	GF	GA	GAv	Pts	Promotion
1	Hull City (C, P)	42	26	7	9	100	45	2.222	59	Promotion to the Second Division
2	Wrexham	42	24	9	9	106	51	2.078	57	
3	Stockport County	42	21	12	9	99	58	1.707	54	
4	Chester	42	22	8	12	94	66	1.424	52	
5	Walsall	42	19	10	13	75	58	1.293	48	

Source: rsssf.com
(C) Champions; (P) Promoted

==== Matches ====
Win Draw Loss

#	Date	Home	Result	Away	Venue	Att.	Scorers (Note: Hull scorers only)
1	27.08.32	Walsall	1–0	Hull City	A	7,067	
2	29.08.32	Hull City	4–1	Wrexham	H	7,476	Duncan (2), Sargeant, Wainscoat
3	03.09.32	Hull City	1–1	Gateshead	H	10,204	Wainscoat
4	07.09.32	Wrexham	3–1	Hull City	A	7,034	McNaughton
5	10.09.32	Stockport County	3–5	Hull City	A	7,009	Gardner, McNaughton, Wainscoat (2), Forward
6	17.09.32	Hull City	3–1	Darlington	H	8,147	Wainscoat (2), McNaughton
7	24.09.32	Doncaster Rovers	1–1	Hull City	A	5,882	Sargeant
8	01.10.32	Hull City	4–0	Southport	H	6,061	McNaughton (3), Sargeant
9	08.10.32	Hull City	5–1	Barnsley	H	7,857	McNaughton (4), Sargeant
10	15.10.32	Hartlepools United	0–1	Hull City	A	4,553	Sargeant
11	22.10.32	Mansfield Town	2–1	Hull City	A	8,436	McNaughton
12	29.10.32	Hull City	4–2	Rotherham United	H	7,997	Wainscoat, Duncan, McNaughton, Forward
13	05.11.32	Accrington Stanley	1–2	Hull City	A	4,478	Sargeant, Duncan
14	12.11.32	Hull City	5–0	New Brighton	H	6,792	McNaughton (2), Wainscoat (3)
15	19.11.32	Chester City	1–1	Hull City	A	10,064	Wainscoat
16	03.12.32	Carlisle United	1–1	Hull City	A	4,073	McNaughton
17	17.12.32	Crewe Alexandra	1–1	Hull City	A	4,941	Jordan
18	24.12.32	Hull City	1–1	Rochdale	H	10,881	Wainscoat
19	26.12.32	Hull City	3–1	Halifax Town	H	15,199	McNaughton, Sargeant (2)
20	27.12.32	Halifax Town	1–3	Hull City	A	9,311	McNaughton (2), Longden
21	31.12.32	Hull City	0–0	Walsall	H	9,803	
22	07.01.33	Gateshead	2–3	Hull City	A	7,723	Sargeant, McNaughton (2)
23	19.01.33	Hull City	3–0	Barrow	H	4,638	Sargeant, Forward, Duncan
24	21.01.33	Hull City	3–0	Stockport County	H	8,883	McNaughton (2), Duncan
25	01.02.33	Darlington	3–2	Hull City	A	2,211	(o.g.), McNaughton
26	04.02.33	Hull City	6–1	Doncaster Rovers	H	7,985	Duncan (3), Sargeant, McNaughton (2)
27	11.02.33	Southport	0–1	Hull City	A	4,740	McNaughton
28	18.02.33	Barnsley	1–0	Hull City	A	7,360	
29	25.02.33	Hull City	3–0	Hartlepools United	H	5,323	McNaughton (2), Wainscoat
30	04.03.33	Hull City	4–1	Mansfield Town	H	8,630	Wainscoat, McNaughton (3)
31	11.03.33	Rotherham United	3–2	Hull City	A	6,861	Longden, Bullock
32	18.03.33	Hull City	4–2	Accrington Stanley	H	9,708	Bullock, Wainscoat (2), McNaughton
33	25.03.33	New Brighton	1–0	Hull City	A	4,377	
34	01.04.33	Hull City	2–0	Chester City	H	20,248	Wainscoat, Forward
35	08.04.33	Barrow	0–2	Hull City	A	5,142	Wainscoat, McNaughton
36	14.04.33	Tranmere Rovers	2–0	Hull City	A	11,011	
37	15.04.33	Hull City	6–1	Carlisle United	H	12,023	Forward, McNaughton, (o.g.), Wainscoat, Sargeant (2)
38	17.04.33	Hull City	3–0	Tranmere Rovers	H	16,117	McNaughton (2), Wainscoat
39	22.04.33	York City	1–2	Hull City	A	8,673	Forward, Wainscoat
40	29.04.33	Hull City	3–0	Crewe Alexandra	H	8,839	Hill, Longden, McNaughton
41	01.05.33	Hull City	2–1	York City	H	19,233	McNaughton (2)
42	08.05.33	Rochdale	3–2	Hull City	A	4,387	McNaughton (2)

=== FA Cup ===
==== Matches ====
Win Draw Loss

#	Date	Home	Result	Away	Venue	Att.	Scorers
1R	26.11.32	Stalybridge Celtic	2–8	Hull City	A	6,641	Wainscoat (4), Forward, Hill, McNaughton, Sargeant
2R	10.12.32	Carlisle United	1–1	Hull City	A	10,365	Sargeant
2R	15.12.32	Hull City	2–1	Carlisle United	H	12,000	Forward, Wainscoat
3R	14.01.33	Hull City	0–2	Sunderland	H	22,566	

== Squad ==
Name	Position	Nationality	Place of birth	Date of birth (age) (Note: Players' ages listed as they were on 1 July 1932, the official start date of the 1932–33 season)	Previous club	Date signed	Fee
Goalkeepers
Edgar Ainsworth	GK	ENG	Hull	8 September 1910 (age 21)	Reserves	May 1933	–
Fred Gibson	GK	ENG	Somercotes	18 June 1907 (age 25)	Dinnington Colliery	September 1926	Unknown
George Maddison	GK	ENG	Birtley	14 August 1902 (age 29)	Tottenham Hotspur	June 1924	Unknown
Defenders
William Bell	FB	ENG	North Seaton	17 March 1905 (age 27)	Grimsby Town	May 1932	Unknown
Stan Denby	HB	ENG	Goole	19 June 1912 (age 20)	Goole Town	April 1932	Unknown
Tommy Gardner	HB	ENG	Huyton	28 May 1910 (age 22)	Grimsby Town	May 1932	Unknown
George Goldsmith	FB	ENG	Loftus	11 March 1905 (age 27)	Loftus United	December 1928	Unknown
Jack Hill	HB	ENG	Hetton-le-Hole	2 March 1897 (age 35)	Bradford City	November 1931	Swap deal
Eric Longden	HB	ENG	Goldthorpe	18 May 1904 (age 28)	Blackpool	December 1932	Unknown
Paddy Mills	HB	ENG	(British Raj) Multan	23 February 1900 (age 32)	Birmingham City	December 1929	Unknown
Arthur Rodgers	FB	ENG	Mexborough	8 February 1907 (age 25)	Denaby United	January 1929	Unknown
Fred Speed	HB	ENG	Annfield Plain	7 April 1909 (age 23)	Newark Town	February 1931	Unknown
Cliff Woodhead	FB	ENG	Darfield	17 August 1908 (age 23)	Denaby United	May 1930	Compensation fee
Attackers
Mervyn Allen	IF	WAL	Bargoed	16 October 1909 (age 22)	(Wales) Ebbw Vale	January 1932	Unknown
Arthur Bullock	OF	ENG	Hull	7 October 1909 (age 22)	Bridlington Town	September 1932	Unknown
Andy Duncan	IF	SCO	Renton	25 January 1911 (age 21)	(Scotland) Renton	May 1930	Unknown
Fred Forward	OF	ENG	Croydon	8 September 1899 (age 32)	Portsmouth	July 1932	Unknown
Davy Jordan	CF	(Ireland) IRE	Belfast	7 April 1911 (age 21)	(Northern Ireland) Ards	July 1932	Unknown
Bill McNaughton	CF	ENG	Poplar	8 December 1905 (age 26)	Gateshead	June 1932	£1,000
Charlie Sargeant	OF	ENG	Cornsay	2 February 1909 (age 23)	Bristol City	May 1932	Unknown
Tom Shelton	CF	ENG	Newstead	21 December 1907 (age 24)	Reserves	March 1932	–
George Stott	OF	ENG	North Shields	31 January 1906 (age 26)	Bradford City	May 1932	Unknown
Russell Wainscoat	IF	ENG	Retford	28 July 1898 (age 33)	Leeds United	October 1931	Unknown
