= List of Hull City A.F.C. records and statistics =

== Most league goals ==
1	Chris Chilton	193
2	Ken Wagstaff	173
3	Paddy Mills	101
4	John Smith	98
5	Keith Edwards	86
6	Sammy Stevens	84
7	Bill Bradbury	82
8=	Ken Houghton	79
8=	Doug Clarke	79
10=	Arthur Temple	77
10=	Dean Windass	77

== Most goals in a season ==
1957–58	Doug Clarke	20
1958–59	Bill Bradbury	25
1959–60	Bill Bradbury	30
1960–61	Roy Shiner	8
1961–62	Chris Chilton	20
1962–63	John McSeveney	16
1963-64	John McSeveney	27
1964–65	Chris Chilton	24
1965–66	Chris Chilton	27
1966–67	Ken Wagstaff	31
1967–68	Ken Wagstaff	20
1968–69	Ken Wagstaff	21
1969–70	Chris Chilton	19
1970-71	Chris Chilton	26
1971-72	Stuart Pearson	15
1972-73	Stuart Pearson	17
1973–74	Stuart Pearson	12
1974-75	Ken Wagstaff	11
1975–76	Alf Wood	10
1976–77	Jeff Hemmerman	7
1977–78	Alan Warboys	7
1978–79	Keith Edwards	25
1979–80	Keith Edwards	20
1980–81	Keith Edwards	17
1981–82	Les Mutrie	28
1982–83	Brian Marwood	20
1983–84	Brian Marwood	16
1984–85	Billy Whitehurst	24
1985–86	Frankie Bunn	20
1986–87	Andy Saville	11
1987–88	Alex Dyer	9
1988–89	Keith Edwards	30
1989–90	Andy Payton	18
1990–91	Andy Payton	25
1991–92	Leigh Jenkinson	9
1992–93	Graeme Atkinson	8
1993–94	Dean Windass	24
1994–95	Dean Windass	17
1995–96	Dean Windass	8
1996–97	Duane Darby	20
1997–98	Duane Darby	15
1998–99	David Brown	11
1999–00	John Eyre	8
2000–01	John Eyre	5
2001–02	Gary Alexander	17
2002–03	Stuart Elliott	12
2003–04	Ben Burgess	18
2004–05	Stuart Elliott	27
2005–06	Stuart Elliott	7
2006–07	Dean Windass	8
2007–08	Fraizer Campbell	15
2008–09	Geovanni	8
2009–10	Stephen Hunt	6
2010–11	Matty Fryatt	9
2011–12	Matty Fryatt	16
2012–13	Robert Koren	9
2013–14	Matty Fryatt	6
2014–15	Nikica Jelavić	8
2015–16	Abel Hernández	22
2016–17	Robert Snodgrass	7
2017–18	Jarrod Bowen	14
2018–19	Jarrod Bowen	22
2019–20	Jarrod Bowen	17
2020–21	Mallik Wilks	22
2021–22	Keane Lewis-Potter	13
2022–23	Óscar Estupiñán	13
2023–24	Jaden Philogene	12
2024–25	João Pedro	6
2025-26	Oli McBurnie	17

== Most league appearances ==
1	Andy Davidson	520
2	George Maddison	430
3	Chris Chilton	415
4	Garreth Roberts	414
5	Billy Bly	403
6	Matt Bell	393
7	Ken Wagstaff	374
8	Tony Norman	372
9=	Tommy Bleakley	368
9=	Doug Clarke	368

== Players ==
Youngest Player

Matt Edeson, 16 years & 63 days – Hull City vs Fulham – 10 October 1992

Oldest Player

Steve Harper, 40 years & 71 days – Hull City vs Manchester United – 24 May 2015

Oldest goal scorer

Dean Windass, 39 years & 235 days – Hull City v Portsmouth

== Results ==
Biggest Victory

11–1 vs Carlisle United, Division 3, 14 January 1939

In Premier League (home):

6–0 vs Fulham, Premier League, 28 December 2013

In Premier League (away):

4–0 vs Cardiff City, Premier League, 22 February 2014

Biggest Defeat

0–8 vs Wolverhampton Wanderers, Division 2, 4 November 1911

0–8 vs Wigan Athletic, EFL Championship, 14 July 2020

== Transfer fees ==
Paid

In excess of £20,000,000 (reportedly) – Nobel Mendy from Rayo Vallecano – 2026

£20,000,000 (reportedly) – Konstantinos Tzolakis from Olympiacos – 2026

£13,000,000 – Ryan Mason from Tottenham Hotspur – 2016

£10,000,000 – Abel Hernández from Palermo – 2014

£8,000,000 (reportedly) – Jake Livermore from Tottenham Hotspur – 2014

£7,000,000 – Robert Snodgrass from Norwich City – 2014

£6,000,000 (reportedly) (rising to £7,000,000) – Shane Long from West Bromwich Albion – 2014 & Nikica Jelavić from Everton – 2014

£5,000,000 – Tom Huddlestone from Tottenham – 2013

£5,000,000 – Jimmy Bullard from Fulham – 2009

£3,500,000 – Stephen Hunt from Reading – 2009 (undisclosed fee reportedly in the region of £3.5 million)

£3,000,000 – Seyi Olofinjana from Stoke City – 2009

£2,600,000 – Nick Proschwitz from Paderborn 07 – 2012 (€3.3 million)

£2,500,000 – Anthony Gardner from Tottenham Hotspur – 2008 (originally a loan with the option to sign permanently for a fee in the region of £2.5 million)

£2,500,000 – Kamil Zayatte from Young Boys – 2009 (undisclosed fee reported to equal the club's transfer record for Gardner)

£2,000,000 – Péter Halmosi from Plymouth Argyle – 2008 (undisclosed fee reportedly in the region of £2 million)

£1,800,000 – Steven Mouyokolo from Boulogne – 2009 (undisclosed fee reportedly in the region of £1.8 million)

£1,700,000 – Kamel Ghilas from Celta Vigo – 2009 (undisclosed fee reportedly in the region of £1.7 million)

£1,500,000 – Daniel Cousin from Rangers – 2008

£1,000,000 – Caleb Folan from Wigan Athletic – 2007

£500,000 – Dean Marney from Tottenham Hotspur – 2006 (undisclosed fee reported as £500,000 plus up to a further conditional £500,000)

Received

£22,000,000 – Jarrod Bowen to West Ham United – 2020

£17,000,000 – Harry Maguire to Leicester City – 2017

£12,500,000 – Shane Long to Southampton – 2014

£10,000,000 – Robert Snodgrass to West Ham – 2017

£10,000,000 – Jake Livermore to West Bromwich Albion – 2017

£8,000,000 – James Chester to West Bromwich Albion – 2015

£4,000,000 – Michael Turner to Sunderland – 2009

£2,000,000 – Sam Ricketts to Bolton Wanderers – 2009 (undisclosed fee reportedly in the region of £2–3 million)

£1,250,000 – Leon Cort to Crystal Palace – 2006

£1,000,000 – Craig Fagan to Derby County – 2007 (£750,000 plus a further £250,000 due to promotion)

£900,000 (reported) – Jack Hobbs to Nottingham Forest – 2014

£750,000 – Andy Payton to Middlesbrough – 1991

£700,000 – Dean Windass to Aberdeen – 1995
