= 1905 in association football =

The following are the football (soccer) events of the year 1905 throughout the world.

== Events ==
- Leeds City F.C. admitted to the English Football League.
- On February 19, Alf Common becomes the first player to be transferred for a fee of £1,000 (a 2011 equivalent of roughly £95,000), in a transfer from Sunderland A.F.C. to Middlesbrough F.C.

=== Clubs formed in 1905 ===
- Charlton Athletic Football Club
- Crystal Palace Football Club
- Chelsea Football Club
- Club Atletico Boca Juniors
- Galatasaray SK - Turkey
- Sport Club do Recife - Brazil
- ADO Den Haag - Netherlands
- A.C. Perugia Calcio - Italy
- 1. FSV Mainz 05 - Germany

== Winners club national championship ==
- Germany: Union 92 Berlin
- Hungary: Ferencvárosi TC
- Italy: Juventus
- Scotland:
  - Scottish Division One – Celtic
  - Scottish Division Two – Clyde
  - Scottish Cup – Third Lanark

== International tournaments ==
- 1905 British Home Championship (February 25 – April 8, 1905)

England

== Births ==
- January 18 – Enrique Ballesteros, Uruguayan footballer
- March 17 – William Bell, English footballer
- May 6 – Billy Dixon, English professional footballer (died 1956)
- May 11 – Pedro Petrone, Uruguayan footballer
- September 25 – Aurelio González (Paraguayan footballer)
- September 26 – Karl Rappan, Austrian footballer and manager (died 1996)
- October 16 – Ernst Kuzorra, German international footballer (died 1990)
- December 28 – Fulvio Bernardini, Italian international footballer and trainer (died 1977)

== Deaths ==
- September 6 - Morris Bates, 39, former Nottingham Forest player and founding member of Woolwich Arsenal FC, tuberculosis.
