= Bill Bradbury (footballer, born 1933) =

English footballer

Personal information
- Full name: William Bradbury
- Date of birth: 3 April 1933
- Place of birth: Matlock, England
- Date of death: 9 August 1999 (aged 66)
- Place of death: Chesterfield, England
- Height: 5 ft 10 in (1.78 m)
- Position: Inside forward

Senior career*
Years	Team	Apps	(Gls)
1950–1954	Coventry City	24	(7)
1954–1955	Birmingham City	3	(2)
1955–1960	Hull City	178	(82)
1960	Bury	18	(4)
1960–1961	Workington	23	(5)
1961–1962	Southport	11	(2)
1962–1963	Wigan Athletic	27	(13)
1963–1964	Prescot Cables		
1964	Kirkby Town		
- * Club domestic league appearances and goals

William Bradbury (3 April 1933 – 9 August 1999) was an English professional footballer who scored 102 goals from 257 appearances in the Football League playing for Coventry City, Birmingham City, Hull City, Bury, Workington and Southport. He played as an inside forward.

== Career ==
Bradbury was born in Matlock, Derbyshire. As a youngster he played for the Rowsley and District Youth League XI, and went on to turn professional with Coventry City. He played 24 league games in four years with Coventry and then spent a short time with Birmingham City, where the number of top-class forwards – all five reached double figures of goals scored in the 1954–55 season – made it hard for him to break through. He joined Hull City in October 1955.

Despite joining halfway through the season, Bradbury finished as Hull's leading scorer, with nine league goals as the club were relegated from the Second Division. For the next three seasons he also finished as leading scorer, with 18, 19 and 30 league goals respectively; the latter total remains (as of 2009) Hull's post-Second World War league record, and made a major contribution to the club's promotion back to the Second Division in the 1958–59 season. Hull teammate Andy Davidson described him thus:

Bill Bradbury should have played at a far higher level with his ability, but he really was such a clown. He had terrific ability, but I sometimes think he'd have been happier being a comedian.

In February 1960, Bradbury joined Bury for a fee of £5,000. He was unable to keep his place in the 1960–61 season, asked for a transfer, and spent the remainder of the season in the Fourth Division with Workington. He then had a season at Southport, another as player-coach with Wigan Athletic, where he scored 13 goals in 27 Cheshire League appearances, and finished his career with Prescot Cables and Kirkby Town.

Bradbury died of a heart attack in Chesterfield, Derbyshire, in 1999 at the age of 66.

Bill Bradbury attended the Ernest Bailey Grammar School in Matlock, Derbyshire from 1944 to 1949.
