= Percy Mills (footballer) =

English footballer

Personal information
- Full name: Percy Clifford Mills
- Date of birth: 10 January 1909
- Place of birth: Barton-upon-Humber, England
- Date of death: 1967 (aged 57–58)
- Height: 6 ft 0 in (1.83 m)
- Position: Defender

Senior career*
Years	Team	Apps	(Gls)
- Barton Town
1926	Grimsby Town	0	(0)
1926	Hull City	0	(0)
1927–1939	Notts County	409	(21)
- * Club domestic league appearances and goals

Percy Clifford Mills (10 January 1909 – 1967) was an English footballer who played in the Football League for Notts County where he made over 400 appearances.

== Family ==
Percy's brother Paddy Mills was also a footballer, notably for Hull City and Notts County.

Percy is also the grandfather of former Hull City and Leicester City manager Nigel Pearson.
