= Edgar Ainsworth (footballer) =

English footballer

Personal information
- Full name: Edgar Ward Ainsworth
- Date of birth: 1910
- Place of birth: Kingston upon Hull, England
- Date of death: 1952 (aged 41–42)
- Position: Goalkeeper

Senior career*
Years	Team	Apps	(Gls)
- Old Bolevardiers
- Bridlington Town
1932	Hull City	1	(0)
1933	York City	0	(0)
1934	Hull City	1	(0)

International career
- England Amateur
- * Club domestic league appearances and goals

Edgar Ward Ainsworth (1910–1952) was a footballer who played in The Football League for Hull City and York City.
