= Fred Forward =

English footballer

Personal information
- Full name: Fredrick John Forward
- Date of birth: 8 September 1899
- Place of birth: Croydon, England
- Date of death: 1977 (aged 77–78)
- Height: 5 ft 7 in (1.70 m)
- Position: Winger

Senior career*
| Years | Team | Apps | (Gls) |
- Brighton Railway
| 1921–1923 | Crystal Palace | 6 | (0) |
| 1924–1926 | Newport County | 101 | (10) |
| 1926–1931 | Portsmouth | 183 | (27) |
| 1932 | Hull City | 39 | (6) |
| – | Bath City | | |
| – | Margate | | |
| Total | | 329 | (43) |
- * Club domestic league appearances and goals

Fredrick John Forward (8 September 1899 – 1977) was a footballer who played in The Football League for Crystal Palace, Newport County, Portsmouth, Hull City. He also played for Bath City and Margate.

== Honours ==
Portsmouth

- FA Cup runner-up: 1928–29
