= Andy Duncan (footballer, born 1911) =

Scottish footballer

Personal information
- Full name: Andrew Duncan
- Date of birth: 25 January 1911
- Place of birth: Renton, Scotland
- Date of death: 10 October 1983 (aged 72)
- Place of death: Southall, England
- Height: 5 ft 5 3/4 in (1.67 m)
- Position: Inside forward

Senior career*
Years	Team	Apps	(Gls)
- Renton Thistle
- Dumbarton
1930–1934	Hull City	105	(31)
1934–1938	Tottenham Hotspur	93	(22)
- Chelmsford City
- * Club domestic league appearances and goals

Andrew Duncan (25 January 1911 – 10 October 1983) was a Scottish professional footballer who played for Renton Thistle, Dumbarton, Hull City, Tottenham Hotspur and Chelmsford City.

== Football career ==
Duncan started his playing career at his local club Renton Thistle before joining Dumbarton. In 1930 the inside forward moved to Hull City where he played 105 matches and found the net on 31 occasions. Duncan joined Tottenham Hotspur in 1934 where he went on to feature in 103 games and scoring 26 goals in all competitions for the White Hart Lane club. After leaving the Spurs in 1938 he ended his playing career at Chelmsford City.
