= Billy Bly =

English footballer

Personal information
- Full name: William Bly
- Date of birth: 15 May 1920
- Place of birth: Newcastle upon Tyne, England
- Date of death: 24 March 1982 (aged 61)
- Place of death: Kingston upon Hull, England
- Position: Goalkeeper

Senior career*
| Years | Team | Apps | (Gls) |
- Walker Celtic
| 1938–1959 | Hull City | 403 | (0) |
| 1942–1943 | → Dumbarton (guest) | 7 | (0) |
| 1961–1962 | Weymouth | 28 | (0) |
| 1962–1965 | Hull Brunswick | | |
| Total | | 438 | (0) |
- * Club domestic league appearances and goals

William Bly (15 May 1920 – 24 March 1982) was an English professional football goalkeeper who played in The Football League for Hull City. As of November 2016, he is fourth on Hull City's most league appearances list. Hull City and North Ferriby United contest the annual Billy Bly Memorial Trophy.

Bly was released by Hull City at the end of the 1959–60 season and received a benefit match in October 1961, in which he featured. He had been keeping fit at the Brunswick Institute before joining Weymouth part-way through the 1961–62 season. He made his debut against Wellington Town on 11 November and played for the club for the remainder of the season.

He then joined Hull Brunswick, who played in Division Two of the Yorkshire League, where he remained until his retirement. He thereafter joined the coaching staff.
