= Arthur Bullock =

English footballer

Personal information
- Full name: Arthur Bullock
- Date of birth: 7 October 1909
- Place of birth: Hull, England
- Date of death: 1997 (aged 87–88)
- Position: Outside forward

Senior career*
Years	Team	Apps	(Gls)
1932–1934	Hull City	18	(3)
1934–1935	York City	6	(0)
- Bridlington Town
Total		24	(3)

International career
1924	England schools	2	(0)
- * Club domestic league appearances and goals

Arthur Bullock (7 October 1909 – 1997) was an English professional footballer who played as an outside forward in the Football League for Hull City and York City, and in non-League football for Bridlington Town. He was capped two times by England schools in 1924.
