= William Bell (English footballer) =

English footballer

Personal information
- Full name: William Todd Bell
- Date of birth: 17 March 1905
- Place of birth: North Seaton, England
- Date of death: 1937 (aged 31–32)
- Position: Full-back

Senior career*
Years	Team	Apps	(Gls)
1925–1926	Blyth Spartans		
1926–1928	Sheffield United	5	(0)
1928–1932	Grimsby Town	11	(0)
1932–1933	Hull City	4	(0)
- * Club domestic league appearances and goals

William Todd Bell (17 March 1905 – 1937) was an English professional footballer who played as a full-back. He played five times for Sheffield United in the Football League First Division.
