= Bill McNaughton =

English footballer

Personal information
- Full name: William Frederick McNaughton
- Date of birth: 8 December 1905
- Place of birth: Poplar, England
- Date of death: 1980 (aged 74–75)
- Position: Centre forward

Senior career*
Years	Team	Apps	(Gls)
	Barking Town	?	(?)
1925	Millwall	0	(0)
	Peterborough & Fletton United	?	(?)
1928–1930	Northampton Town	11	(2)
1930–1932	Gateshead	63	(46)
1932–1934	Hull City	85	(57)
1934–1936	Stockport County	50	(32)
	Walker Celtic	?	(?)
	City of Durham	?	(?)
- * Club domestic league appearances and goals

William Frederick McNaughton (8 December 1905 – 1980) was an English footballer who played as a centre forward.

McNaughton played league football between 1928 and 1936 for Northampton Town, Gateshead and Stockport County. He was also on the books of Millwall in 1925. McNaughton also played non-league football for Barking Town, Peterborough & Fletton United, Walker Celtic and City of Durham.

Bill McNaughton is Hull City AFC's record holder for most overall goals in a season at 42 (41 league).

== Sources ==
- "allfootballers.com". Archived from the original on 13 January 2010.
