= Billy Dixon (footballer, born 1905) =

English footballer

Personal information
- Full name: William Harrison Dixon
- Date of birth: 6 May 1905
- Place of birth: Grimsby, England
- Date of death: 23 February 1956 (aged 50)
- Height: 5 ft 9 in (1.75 m)
- Position: Wing half

Senior career*
Years	Team	Apps	(Gls)
1923	Middlesbrough	0	(0)
1923	Craghead United		
1923–1926	Grimsby Town	9	(0)
1926–1928	Barrow	46	(1)
1928–1929	Poole		
1929–1930	Boston Town		
1930–1935	Bridlington Town		
1935–1936	LNER		
1936–193?	Anlaby United		
- * Club domestic league appearances and goals

William Harrison Dixon (6 May 1905 – 23 February 1956) was an English professional footballer who played as a wing half.
