= Russell Wainscoat =

English footballer

William Russell Wainscoat (28 July 1898 – July 1967) was an English footballer who played at inside left for several clubs in the 1920s and 1930s, spending the best part of his career at Leeds United. He made one appearance for England in 1929.

Powerful inside-left who scored a hat-trick on his league debut for Barnsley and managed two hat-tricks while he was with Leeds. He became a regular at Elland Road and was a popular figure with the fans in his six years with the club (1925–31). He picked up his only cap in 1929 in England's 0–1 defeat by the Scots in Glasgow in a match decided just two minutes from time by a goal scored direct from a corner. Wainscoat left Leeds for Hull in 1931 and helped them to the Division 3 North title two years later. He died at the age of 69. He played 226 games for Leeds scoring 93 times (info from http://www.leeds-fans.org.uk/leeds/players/521.html which states he played for Barnsley, Middlesbrough, Leeds then Hull).

He was born in East Retford, Nottinghamshire.
