= Paddy Mills =

British footballer (1900–1994)

Personal information
- Full name: Bertie Reginald Mills
- Date of birth: 23 February 1900
- Place of birth: Multan, Punjab Province, British India
- Date of death: 22 January 1994 (aged 93)
- Height: 5 ft 10 in (1.78 m)
- Positions: Forward; wing half

Senior career*
| Years | Team | Apps | (Gls) |
- Barton Town
| 1920–1926 | Hull City | 173 | (76) |
| 1926–1929 | Notts County | 76 | (35) |
| 1929 | Birmingham | 13 | (3) |
| 1929–1933 | Hull City | 96 | (25) |
| 1933–1935 | Scunthorpe & Lindsey United | | |
| 1935–193x | Gainsborough Trinity | | |
| 193x–193x | Barton Town | | |
- * Club domestic league appearances and goals

Bertie Reginald "Paddy" Mills (23 February 1900 – 22 January 1994) was a British footballer who scored 139 goals in 358 appearances in the Football League playing for Hull City (in two spells), Notts County and Birmingham. He played as a forward, though in the later part of his career he moved to wing half.

== Career ==
Mills was born in Multan, India, but raised in Barton-upon-Humber, Lincolnshire. He began his football career with local club Barton Town before joining Hull City of the Second Division in 1920. For three consecutive seasons, from 1923–24 to 1925–26, Mills was Hull's leading scorer; in the second of those three seasons, he scored 29 goals in all competitions when no other Hull player reached double figures.

In March 1926, Notts County paid a fee of £3,750 for his services, but he was unable to prevent their relegation from the First Division. In 1927 he was joined by his younger brother Percy, who would go on to play more than 400 games for the club. After three years with County, in which he scored at a rate approaching a goal every other game, Mills moved back to the First Division with Birmingham, but failed to settle, and returned to Hull in December 1929.

Mills contributed two goals in Hull's 1929–30 FA Cup run which took them to the semi-final for the first time in their history, only to lose to eventual Cup-winners Arsenal, following which their form slumped and they were relegated to the Third Division North. New manager Haydn Green converted Mills to play at wing half, though he still scored goals: 12 in 30 games in the 1930–31 season and 11 in 37 the next season. In 1932–33, Hull City won the championship of the Third Division North, winning promotion for the first time in their history. Mills played in nearly half the games, but failed to score, and was released at the end of the season. As of December 2008, his league goal return of 101 in 269 games places him third in Hull City's all-time league goalscorers, and his 110 from 291 appearances puts him fourth when all competitions are counted.

On leaving Hull, Mills moved into non-League football with Scunthorpe & Lindsey United and Gainsborough Trinity before finishing his career at his first club, Barton Town.

After football Mills was employed as a security man at a steelworks in Scunthorpe. He died in 1994 at the age of 93.

== Personal life ==
Mills was great-uncle to football player and manager Nigel Pearson, the grandson of his brother Percy Mills. His daughter Elaine Boyall still lives in the town of Barton-Upon-Humber and so do many of his sister Annie Rebecca Hewitt nee Mills Descendants.

== Honours ==
Hull City

- Football League Third Division North: 1932–33
