= George Maddison (footballer, born 1902) =

English footballer

Personal information
- Full name: George Maddison
- Date of birth: 14 August 1902
- Place of birth: Little Hulton, England
- Date of death: 18 May 1959 (aged 56)
- Height: 6 ft 1/2 in (1.84 m)
- Position: Goalkeeper

Senior career*
Years	Team	Apps	(Gls)
	Birtley Colliery	?	
1922–1923	Tottenham Hotspur	40	
1924–1938	Hull City	430	
- * Club domestic league appearances and goals

George Maddison (14 August 1902 – 18 May 1959) was an English footballer who played for Birtley Colliery, Tottenham Hotspur and Hull City.

== Football career ==
Maddison began his career at Birtley Colliery before joining Tottenham Hotspur in 1922. He made a total of 41 appearances in all competitions for the White Hart Lane club between 1922 and 1923.

Maddison, a commanding goalkeeper signed for Hull City in June 1924 and made his debut at home against Stockport County on 8 November 1924 where he kept a clean sheet in a 3–0 win. He won the Third Division North title with Hull in 1932–33. He holds the second most league appearances for Hull City, with 430 league appearances for the club between 1924 and his retirement in 1938.

== Honours ==
Hull City

- Football League Division Three North 1932–1933 Winners
