= Haydn Green =

English footballer (1887–1957)

Personal information
- Full name: Adrian Green
- Date of birth: 18 March 1887
- Place of birth: Kirkby-in-Ashfield, England
- Date of death: 8 February 1957 (aged 69)
- Place of death: Watford, England

Managerial career
- Years: Team
- 1930–1931: Ebbw Vale
- 1931–1934: Hull City
- 1936–1939: Guildford City
- 1939–1947: Swansea Town
- 1949–1951: Bangor
- 1951–1952: Watford

Adrian "Haydn" Green (18 March 1887 – 8 February 1957) was an English football player and manager. After playing for Nottingham Forest, Manchester United, Aston Villa, Newport County and Reading, he went on to manage Ebbw Vale, Bangor, Hull City, Swansea Town and Watford.

At Hull City, whom he managed from May 1931 until March 1934, Green maintained a winning percentage of 49.59%.
