= Andy Davidson (footballer) =

Scottish footballer

Personal information
- Date of birth: 13 July 1932
- Place of birth: Douglas Water, Scotland
- Date of death: 5 April 2014 (aged 81)
- Place of death: Beverley, Yorkshire, England
- Position: Right back

Youth career
- Douglas Water Thistle

Senior career*
Years	Team	Apps	(Gls)
1952–1968	Hull City	520	(18)
- * Club domestic league appearances and goals

Andrew Davidson (13 July 1932 – 5 April 2014), also known as Jock Davidson, was a Scottish professional footballer born in Douglas Water. As of 2023 Davidson remained the record appearances holder for Hull City, having played 579 times for the club from 1952 to 1968, despite suffering from a broken leg three times during his career.

Davidson arrived at the club after his brother David, six years his senior, had joined the Tigers in 1946 after his work as a long-distance lorry driver brought him south to Hull docks and a brazen request for a trial had been enough to win over manager Frank Buckley at the newly opened Boothferry Park. He made his debut against Blackburn Rovers in 1952, playing as a centre-forward, but established himself as a tough-tacking full-back over 18 seasons with the club. By the late 1950s, he had been made club captain. He won the Third Division with Hull in 1965–66, missing just one game.

After retiring through injury in 1968, Davidson remained with Hull City until 1979, working as a scout, coach, and as assistant manager to both John Kaye and Ken Houghton. After leaving the club he lived in South Cave, with his wife Susan. He died aged 81 on 5 April 2014, in a nursing home in Beverley, East Yorkshire.

== Honours ==
Hull City

- Third Division: 1965–66
