= Hull City A.F.C. =

Association football club in England

Hull City
- Full name: Hull City Association Football Club
- Nickname: The Tigers
- Founded: 28 June 1904; 122 years ago
- Ground: MKM Stadium
- Capacity: 24,983
- Owner: Acun Medya
- Chairman: Acun Ilıcalı
- Head Coach: Sergej Jakirović
- League: Premier League
- 2025–26: EFL Championship, 6th of 24 (promoted via play-offs)
- Website: wearehullcity.co.uk
Home colours	Away colours	Third colours

Hull City Association Football Club is a professional association football club based in Kingston upon Hull, East Riding of Yorkshire, England. They compete in the Premier League, the top tier of English football. Hull play their home games at the MKM Stadium, after moving from Boothferry Park in 2002. The club's traditional home colours are black and amber, often featuring in a striped design on the shirt, hence their nickname, the Tigers. Hull also contest the Humber derby with both Grimsby Town and Scunthorpe United.

The club was founded in 1904 and was admitted into the Football League a year later. They remained in the Second Division until relegation in 1930. Hull won the Third Division North title in 1932–33, but were relegated three years later. They won the Third Division North under the stewardship of Raich Carter in 1948–49, and this time remained in the second tier for seven seasons. Having been promoted again in 1958–59, they were relegated the following season and remained in the Third Division until they were promoted as champions under Cliff Britton in 1965–66. Twelve seasons in the second tier culminated in two relegations in four years by 1981. They were promoted from the Fourth Division at the end of the 1982–83 campaign and were beaten finalists in the inaugural Associate Members' Cup in 1984.

Hull were relegated in 1991 and again in 1996, but secured back-to-back promotions in 2003–04 and 2004–05. The club went on to win the 2008 play-off final against Bristol City to win a place in the Premier League for the first time. They were relegated after two seasons, but were promoted again from the EFL Championship in 2012–13. Hull played in their first FA Cup final in 2014, who despite scoring twice early on, lost 3–2 to Arsenal after extra-time. Relegated from the Premier League the following year, they returned for a third time with victory over Sheffield Wednesday in the 2016 play-off final. They were relegated again from the top-flight just a year later, before dropping into the third tier in 2020. Hull secured immediate promotion as champions of League One at the end of the 2020–21 campaign. Five years later, the club returned once more to the Premier League by winning the 2026 play-off final against Middlesbrough.

== History ==
Chart showing the progress of Hull City's league finishes since the 1905–06 season

Acun Ilıcalı, the owner of the club since 2022

=== Foundation and early progress (1904–1945) ===
Hull City Association Football Club was founded on 28 June 1904. Due to the popularity of rugby league in Kingston upon Hull, previous attempts to found an association football club in the city had proved difficult. By 1904, both Hull F.C. and Hull K.R. were already well-established sides with passionate local backing. The desire for a third team to represent the city in competitive sport was not particularly present at the time, but support would soon grow. The club faced some initial disruptions after foundation, as they had been unable to apply for membership of the Football League for the 1904–05 season and instead played only in friendlies. The first of these matches was a 2–2 draw with Notts County on 1 September 1904, with a crowd of 6,000 in attendance. These early matches were played at Hull F.C.'s home, the Boulevard. The club's first competitive football match was in the FA Cup preliminary round, drawing 3–3 with Stockton on 17 September, but they were eliminated after losing the replay 4–1 on 22 September.

After disputes with landlords at the Boulevard, Hull City temporarily moved to the Circle, a cricket ground in West Park. After having played 44 friendly fixtures the previous season, Hull City were admitted into the Football League Second Division for the 1905–06 season. Other teams competing in the league that season included Manchester United and Chelsea, as well as Yorkshire rivals Barnsley, Bradford City and Leeds City. Furthermore, Grimsby Town, from the southern bank of the Humber Estuary in Lincolnshire, were also in the Second Division. Hull and Grimsby were the only two professional teams who were granted official exemption from playing league football on Christmas Day because of the demands of the fish trade. Hull defeated Barnsley 4–1 at home in their first game, and ended the season with a solid 5th-place finish.

In March 1906, a permanent home ground was opened for Hull City just across the road from the cricket ground, known as Anlaby Road. It would house the team until 1939. Under the guidance of player-manager Ambrose Langley, Hull continued to finish consistently in the top-half of the table. They came close to promotion in the 1909–10 season, recording what would be the club's highest-ever league finish for nearly a century. Hull had ended the season level on points with Oldham Athletic, but finished below the Latics due to goal average, where a narrow margin of 0.29 of a goal had meant the Tigers missed out on promotion.

Hull would continue to regularly finish in the top-half of the table prior to the suspension of English football during the First World War, but their momentum had gone after its restart in 1919. The Tigers began to struggle, finishing in the bottom half of the table in seven seasons out of the next eleven. This culminated in relegation to the Third Division North following the 1929–30 season. Despite the league campaign ending in relegation, Hull found much better luck in the FA Cup. Prior to 2014, Hull's greatest result in any cup competition was achieved in the 1929–30 FA Cup. The Tigers began with victories over the eventual champions of the Third Division, Plymouth Argyle and the eventual champions of the Second Division, Blackpool. They then overcame Manchester City to meet Newcastle United in the quarter-finals. The first game at St James' Park finished as a 1–1 draw, but, in the home replay, Hull beat Newcastle 1–0. This meant Hull played the semi-finals, where they were paired with Arsenal, in a game held at the neutral venue of Elland Road in Leeds. The semi-final ended 2–2, and, so, was replayed at Villa Park in Birmingham four days later. Arsenal won the semi-final replay 1–0, thus ending Hull's cup run.

Hull City squad in 1936

Hull would eventually be promoted back to the Second Division after they won their first-ever league title in the 1932–33 season. Managed by Haydn Green, they had finished above 2nd-placed Wrexham by just 2 points, mainly due to the goals of Bill McNaughton who was the league's top-scorer that season with 41 goals.

=== Lower-league success and stagnation (1945–1982) ===
After the Second World War, the club moved to another new ground, Boothferry Park. In the 1948–49 season, under the tutelage of former England international and now player-manager Raich Carter, Hull won promotion from the Third Division North as champions. "Yo-yoing" between the second and third tiers of English football, City had promotion seasons from the Third Division to the Second Division again in 1958–59 and 1965–66, winning the Third Division title in the latter-season. For the majority of the 1960s, Hull was managed by Cliff Britton, who has since achieved cult-status with supporters of the club for the successes he achieved, especially the Third Division title win in 1966. The side that year featured record club appearance-maker Andy Davidson and record club goal-scorer Chris Chilton as well as striker Ken Houghton and a young Ken Wagstaff, among others. It is widely regarded as one of the best squads the club has ever had.

On 1 August 1970, Hull became the first team in the world to be eliminated from a cup competition on penalties, beaten by Manchester United in the semi-final of the Watney Cup.

By the early 1980s, Hull City were in the Fourth Division, and financial collapse led to receivership.

=== Robinson years and fall to the fourth tier (1982–1996) ===
Ahead of the 1982–83 season, Hull were saved from their financial troubles. Don Robinson, a businessman who had made his money as a promoter of professional wrestling, bought a majority stake in the club. Robinson arrived having been chairman of Scarborough, and brought the non-league side's manager, Colin Appleton, in as Smith's permanent replacement. That season may have seen big changes amongst the backroom staff, but on the field Hull relied on their own talents to turn things around. The early 1980s had seen a new crop of young players break into the first team, with most of them going on to do great things in football. Winger Brian Marwood made an appearance for England in 1988, whilst midfielder Steve McClaren would manage the national side between 2006 and 2007. Elsewhere, the Tigers' efficient strike partnership of notorious hard man Billy Whitehurst and creative veteran Les Mutrie had become feared throughout the Football League. Additionally, local lad Garreth Roberts captained the side from midfield as Hull earned promotion with a 2nd-placed finish.

After narrowly missing out on back-to-back promotions in May 1984, Appleton left his position at Hull, having been enticed to become the new manager of Swansea City. His replacement was player-manager Brian Horton who would first join the Tigers on their summer tour of Florida the following month, where they visited Walt Disney World, and played the Tampa Bay Rowdies, managed by Rodney Marsh, in the return leg of the Arrow Air Anglo-American Cup. Mark Herman would direct and edit a short documentary film of the tour, with Priestman composing its music. Herman released the finished version online in 2016, titled "A Kick in the Grass". Promotion followed in the 1984–85 season under Horton, with the young City squad now not only talented but experienced too.

Hull remained in the Second Division for the next six years before being relegated in 1991, by which time the club's manager was Terry Dolan. It was during this period in the Second Division that Hull fielded a black player for the first time, when Ray Daniel made his debut on 23 August 1986 in a home game against West Bromwich Albion. He would make 58 league appearances for the Tigers before moving to Cardiff City in August 1989.

The Tigers finished 14th in the Third Division in the 1991–92 season, meaning that they would be competing in the new Second Division the following season. In their first season in the rebranded division, Hull narrowly avoided another relegation, but the board kept faith in Dolan and over the next two seasons they achieved mid-table finishes. Financial difficulties hampered City's progress, as key players such as Alan Fettis and Dean Windass had to be sold to fend off winding-up orders. In the 1995–96 season, Hull were relegated to the Third Division.

=== "The Great Escape" and rise to the top-flight (1996–2008) ===
The Tigers did not secure immediate promotion back to the Second Division in the 1996–97 campaign. In fact, they languished close to the bottom of the table, only ten points clear of relegation, finishing 17th. Despite this, the season was notable due to the arrival of three important players. Firstly, Mark Greaves was bought from non-league Brigg Town, before Gregor Rioch joined from Peterborough United. Midfielder Warren Joyce signed a permanent deal soon after, having been on loan at the club for a short time at the end of the previous season. In July 1997, former tennis player David Lloyd, who was the captain of the British Davis Cup team at the time, completed a takeover of the club. This ended the Needler family's ownership, which had lasted over 50 years. He also acquired Hull F.C. (then known as Hull Sharks) in the same month. Upon Lloyd's arrival, Dolan left. He was succeeded by former England international Mark Hateley, who acted as player-manager. In the 1997–98 season Hull finished in 22nd, albeit a large enough distance above last-placed Doncaster Rovers that they were never in any real danger of relegation.

The next campaign was a lot less comfortable. The relationship between the club's supporters and Lloyd had soured following the unveiling of plans to move the Tigers back to the Boulevard after nearly a century away. Furthermore, Lloyd also wanted to merge City and F.C. together to generate more income, a proposal that did not sit well with either fanbase. In a League Cup fixture away at Bolton Wanderers on 15 September 1998, Hull's travelling fans threw tennis balls onto the pitch to delay the game and show their disapproval for how their club was being run. This is often cited as the first instance of a tennis ball protest in football. The club was eventually sold in November 1998, although Lloyd retained ownership of Boothferry Park. The new owners were a consortium from Sheffield, and headed by businessman Nick Buchanan. Their first decision was to sack Hateley, and promote the now 34-year-old Joyce to replace him as player-manager. When Joyce took over, the club were rooted to the bottom of the Football League. After a hard-fought second half of the campaign, they avoided the drop by five points. As a result, the 1998–99 season is now referred to as "the Great Escape" by supporters.

In October 1999, Hull signed two Jamaica internationals in Ian Goodison and Theo Whitmore. Joyce had remembered the pair's impressive performances at the 1998 World Cup, and when he was presented with an opportunity to sign them, he took it. In the fourth tier, they were unstoppable. Goodison helped to anchor Hull's defence, whilst Whitmore's creativity and flair from midfield dazzled opponents. Despite their talent, they could not save Joyce from losing his job. In April 2000, he was sacked and swiftly replaced by former Aston Villa striker Brian Little. Within a few weeks of Little's appointment, the 1999–00 campaign was over, and Hull had climbed the league as high as 14th. However, soon after the season's conclusion, Lloyd exercised his control over Boothferry Park. Due to rent issues and outstanding financial figures, he called in the bailiffs and locked the club out of their own stadium. Following a short legal battle, Hull were allowed back in the ground ahead of the upcoming 2000–01 season.

That year, the Tigers greatly improved. They achieved a play-off finish, only to lose to Leyton Orient in the semi-finals. By this time, a takeover by former Leeds United director Adam Pearson had been completed and eased the club's precarious financial situation. Pearson began funding Hull upon his arrival, allowing Little to rebuild the team ahead of the 2001–02 season. An overhaul amongst the attack followed, with the additions of Gary Alexander, David Beresford, Lawrie Dudfield, and Ryan Williams. On top of this, Faroese international Julian Johnsson was signed to bolster the midfield, whilst Ben Petty joined from Stoke City to strengthen the defensive line. These new signings initially oversaw success, with Hull occupying a play-off spot for much of the campaign. However, following a rocky start to the new year, Little was dismissed as manager on 27 February 2002. In the time it took to find his replacement, interim Billy Russell lost five out of his seven games in charge. Jan Mølby, coincidentally Hull's first non-British or Irish manager, was eventually appointed on 4 April 2002. Despite the former Liverpool midfielder's arrival, he could not recover the club's waning form as they slumped to 11th at the season's close.

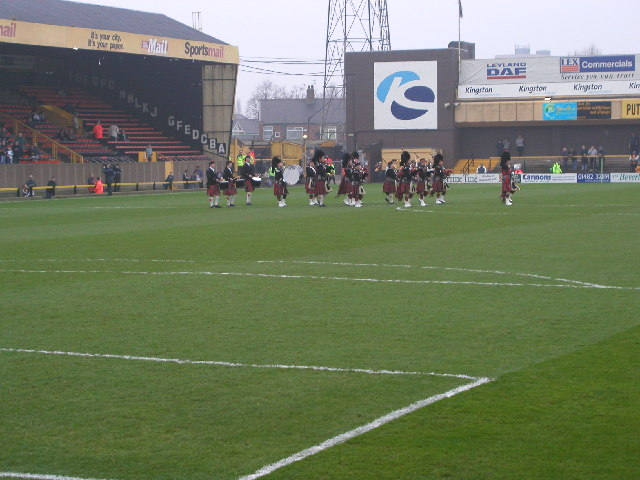
Celebrations before the final game at Boothferry Park, 14 December 2002

The 2002–03 campaign was much the same as its predecessor. Despite its mediocrity, two key signings were made during the prior summer transfer window. Future Hull City Hall of Fame inductees Ian Ashbee and Stuart Elliott arrived from Cambridge United and Motherwell respectively. On 11 October 2002, Mølby was sacked, with Peter Taylor replacing him the next day. The highlight of the season, though, was the change in stadium. After 56 years at Boothferry Park, the Tigers played their final match there on 14 December 2002, a 1–0 loss to Darlington. On 18 December 2002, Hull played their first game at the new KC Stadium, a 1–0 friendly win over Sunderland. Steve Melton scored the first goal at the new ground. The first competitive match came a week later, on 26 December 2002, a 2–0 win over Hartlepool United in the league. There was a crowd of 22,319 spectators in attendance. By the end of the season, there was nothing to play for, with the Tigers finishing 13th.

The 2003–04 season saw the beginning of one of the club's best-ever eras. Before it began, that summer's transfer window saw the signing of another future Hull City Hall of Fame inductee, as Andy Dawson joined on a free from Humber derby rivals Scunthorpe United. Other important arrivals that window were Danny Allsopp, Richard Hinds, Jason Price, and Alton Thelwell. Later that season, young prospects Ryan France and Boaz Myhill both also signed for the club. After 17 games, Hull were sat 1st in the league table. They were eventually forced to settle for 2nd-place promotion behind Doncaster Rovers, largely due to dropping vital points either side of a strong Christmas period. The following year, in the 2004–05 season, the Tigers completed the impressive feat of back-to-back promotions. The most noteworthy addition to the squad had been Hull-born veteran Nick Barmby, who arrived on a free transfer from Leeds United.

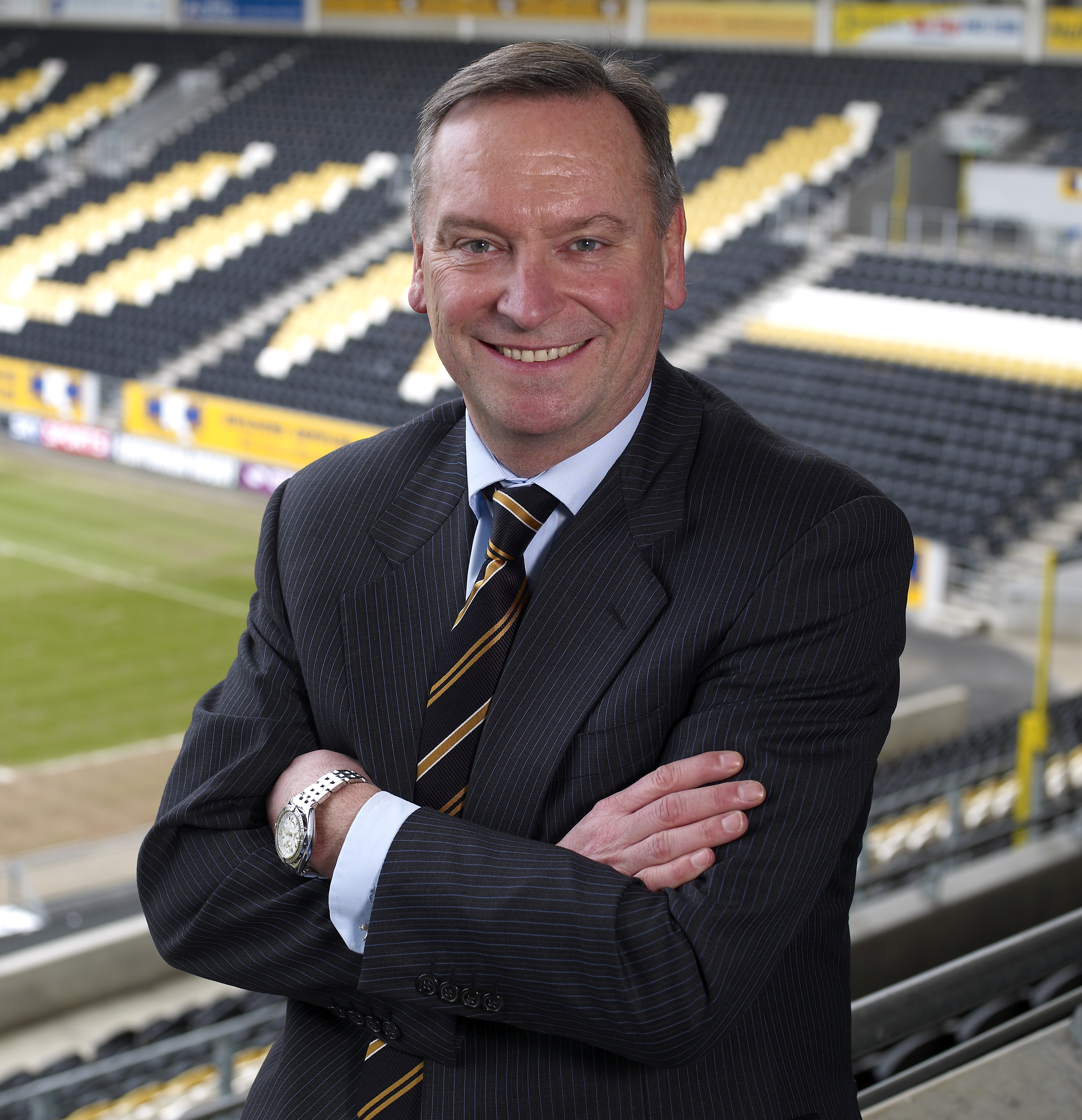
Paul Duffen, owner of Hull City between 2007 and 2010

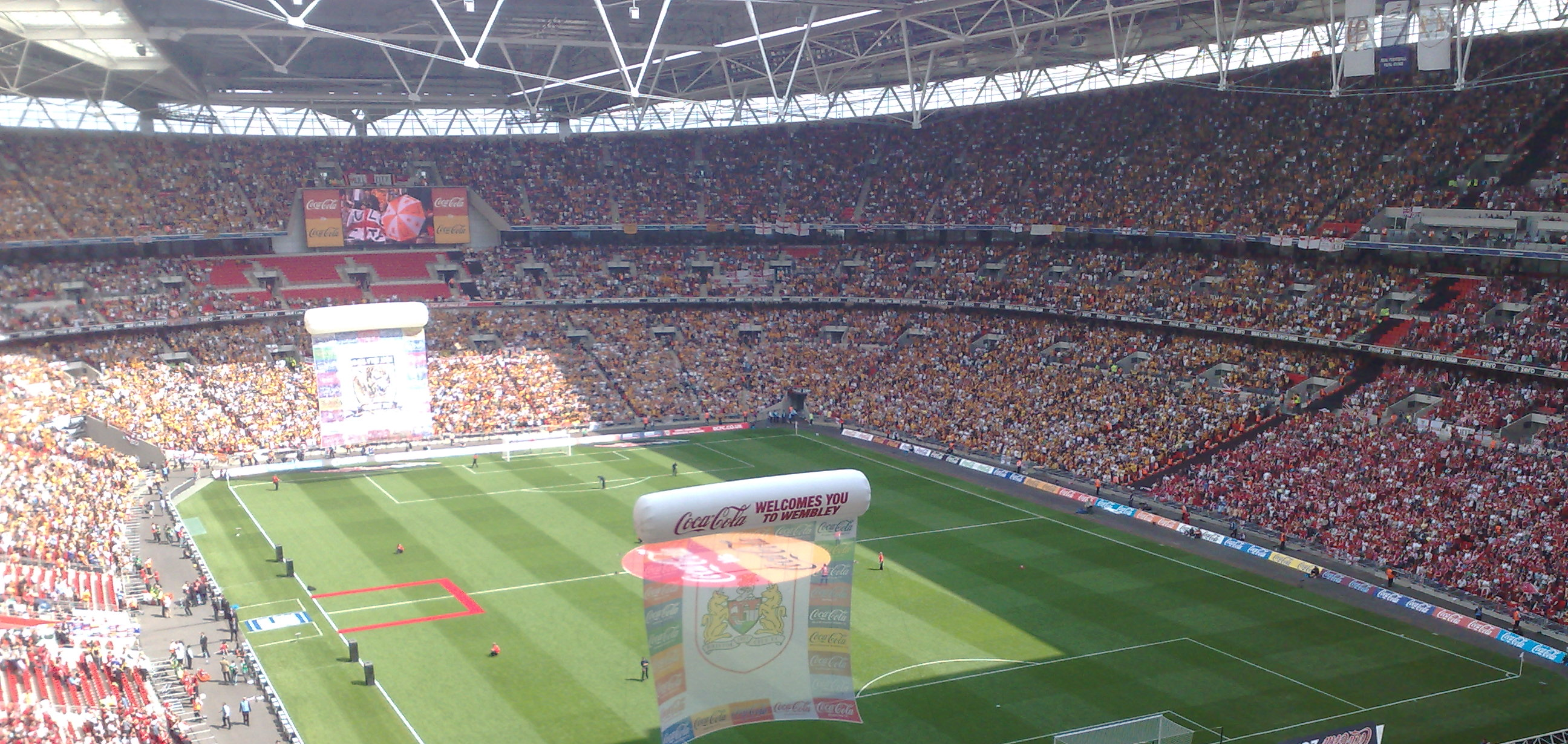
Hull City supporters prior to the 2008 play-off final against Bristol City

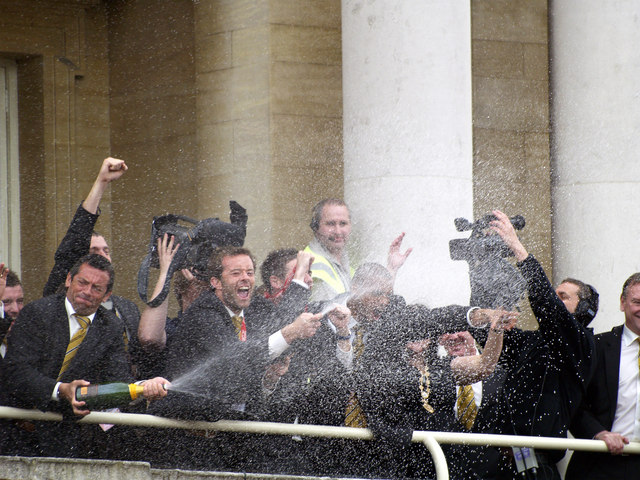
Phil Brown and players celebrate on promotion to the Premier League in 2008

The 2005–06 season was Hull's first in the second tier since the 1990–91 campaign. At the turn of the new year, they were in 17th-place, only falling to 18th-place by the end of the season, finishing above the drop by 10 points and securing survival. However, after the campaign's conclusion, manager Taylor left Hull for Crystal Palace. He was succeeded by Phil Parkinson, who struggled at his new job, having overseen previous success with Colchester United. On 4 December 2006, Parkinson was sacked with the Tigers in the relegation zone. His replacement would prove pivotal to the next few years of the club's history. Phil Brown was announced as the new manager on 4 January 2007, having worked as interim boss alongside his new assistant Colin Murphy since Parkinson's dismissal. In that time, Brown and Murphy had accelerated Hull up to 21st-place and away from immediate danger. On 17 January 2007, local legend Dean Windass made a return to the Tigers, joining on loan from Bradford City for the remainder of the 2006–07 season. His eight goals helped secure Hull's Championship status, with a 21st-placed finish.

Ahead of the 2007–08 campaign, Windass' move was made permanent. Other key signings made in the transfer window included forward Caleb Folan and Australia international Richard Garcia, with the latter arriving from Brown's old club, Colchester. The club only managed to afford these transfers through new ownership. On 11 June 2007, Adam Pearson had sold the club for a reported £13m to a consortium led by Paul Duffen. Russell Bartlett and Martin Walker were also involved in the takeover. In response to the news, Pearson said that during his tenure he "had taken the club as far as [he] could".

On the pitch, things started slowly. After 11 games, Hull were in 18th. However, after gaining momentum through the winter, the Tigers were in 8th-place after 33 games, and only one point off the play-offs. Since the start of the campaign, Fraizer Campbell had been loaned in to help push the team up the league and it was clearly working. By the close of the season, not only had Campbell had racked up 15 goals, but Hull had finished 3rd-place and qualified for the play-offs.

In the semi-finals, they faced Watford. Hull earned a 2–0 win away at Vicarage Road in the first leg, in part thanks to John Eustace receiving a red card and reducing their hosts to 10 men. In the second leg, Darius Henderson provided a scare as Watford went 1–0 up, only for the Tigers to score a late flurry of goals and win 4–1 on the night and 6–1 on aggregate. On 24 May 2008, Bristol City were the only thing between Hull and the Premier League. At Wembley Stadium, Phil Brown's men reached the top-flight for the first time in the club's history, after Dean Windass' incredible first half volley secured a famous 1–0 win. Hull's ascent from the fourth tier to the first tier in just five seasons was the third-fastest in English football history, behind joint-first Swansea City (1977–81) and Wimbledon (1982–86).

=== Premier League football and "yo-yo" years (2008–2016) ===
Throughout the summer of 2008, Brown worked hard to secure new signings to improve squad depth. Craig Fagan returned from Derby County for his third stint with Hull, whilst former Barcelona midfielder Geovanni arrived from Manchester City. Furthermore, three internationals joined the club, namely George Boateng, Péter Halmosi, and Bernard Mendy. Loans were also agreed for a number of players. Marlon King and Paul McShane became Tigers for the season, whilst deals for Anthony Gardner and Kamil Zayatte were both made permanent during the campaign. Daniel Cousin was the last major incoming transfer of the window, signing from Rangers on 11 September 2008.

Despite their strong transfer business, Hull were seen by many as a firm candidate for relegation. However, on 16 August 2008, the Tigers achieved a 2–1 home victory over Fulham on the opening day. Having gone 1–0 down inside 10 minutes, new signing Geovanni scored Hull's first goal ever in the top-flight to equalise, curling a low shot beyond Mark Schwarzer from outside the box. Caleb Folan then won the match late on, after Fagan capitalised on a defensive mistake from Paul Konchesky. The Premier League debutants then went on an impressive run into the early autumn, losing only one of their first nine games. This period included shock away wins over both Arsenal and Tottenham Hotspur. In addition, after a 3–0 win away to West Bromwich Albion, Hull temporarily found themselves joint-second in the table, level on points with Chelsea and only three more behind Liverpool. The Tigers had initially appeared to prove their doubters wrong, only to win just twice more all season. However, after a 1–0 home loss to Manchester United on the final day, Hull escaped relegation thanks to other results going in their favour.

On 29 October 2009, chairman Paul Duffen resigned from his position, likely due to off-the-pitch constraints and having lost the backing of the board. His predecessor, Adam Pearson, was reinstated to replace him on 2 November 2009. By this point, the club's performances were very reflective of their financial situation behind the scenes. At the time of Pearson's return, Hull were sat 19th and with the worst goal difference of any team in the league. Very little had changed by 15 March 2010, the day manager Phil Brown was put on gardening leave after a run of four straight defeats. Brown's replacement was former Crystal Palace and Charlton Athletic boss Iain Dowie, who was announced as the club's "Temporary Football Management Consultant" two days later. The appointment was met with some disbelief by supporters who were hoping for a stronger and more ambitious replacement. Dowie could not keep the Tigers up, with relegation confirmed on 3 May 2010, after a 2–2 draw away at Wigan Athletic. Both Brown and Dowie had their contracts swiftly terminated after the season's conclusion.

Leicester City manager Nigel Pearson was appointed as the Tigers' next permanent manager on 29 June 2010. With yet more financial worries as a result of relegation, Pearson was forced to be frugal in the transfer market ahead of the 2010–11 campaign. A handful of free transfers were made to cover the gaps left by departing members of the first team. The highlight of these was the acquisition of West Brom midfielder Robert Koren, who had just captained Slovenia at the 2010 World Cup. On 16 December 2010, it was confirmed that Assem Allam had become the new owner of Hull City, having promised to pay back club debts and eliminate any possibility of financial ruin. This allowed Hull to spend more money in the upcoming January transfer window, which included reuniting Pearson with his star striker from his time at Leicester, Matty Fryatt, who arrived for £1,200,000. The newly revitalised team set a new club record on 12 March 2011 with 14 away matches unbeaten, breaking a previous record held for over 50 years. The streak was finally broken at 17 matches when Bristol City beat the Tigers 3–0 on the last day of the season at Ashton Gate. On 15 November 2011, Nigel Pearson left the club to return to Leicester. Former player and Hull local Nick Barmby was appointed as his successor, initially as a temporary player-manager, but later as the full-time head coach, after retiring from professional football in January 2012. Barmby was sacked on 8 May 2012, after publicly criticising the club's owners in an interview. In the same month, the club's consultancy agreement with Adam Pearson was terminated.

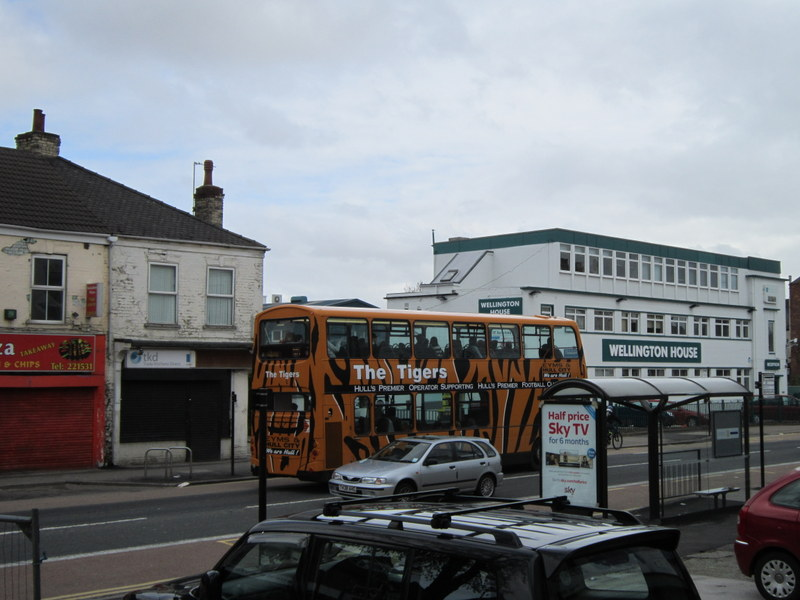
East Yorkshire Motor Services bus in team colours, 2012

On 8 June 2012, Steve Bruce was appointed the club's new permanent manager on a three-year deal, an appointment which would prove pivotal for the club's history. Bruce began by signing experienced defender Abdoulaye Faye from West Ham United, young winger Sone Aluko from Rangers, and technical midfielder Stephen Quinn from Sheffield United. Alongside loanee Ahmed Elmohamady, this quartet would be amongst the backbone of Bruce's promotion push in his first season as manager, the 2012–13 campaign. After a 2–1 victory away at Derby County on 21 December 2012, the Tigers found themselves in the league's top two for the first time that season. Loans for Irish internationals Robbie Brady and David Meyler were both made permanent in the January transfer window, whilst striker Gedo was loaned in from Egyptian giants Al Ahly. He would hit the ground running in East Yorkshire, scoring five goals in his first six games.

Bruce would eventually guide Hull back to the Premier League, after a nervy final day of the season at home to newly crowned league champions Cardiff City on 13 May 2013. The Tigers came from behind to lead 2–1, before Nick Proschwitz had the chance to finish the game off with a penalty in the dying embers of the match. The German saw his effort saved by David Marshall, allowing the Bluebirds to spring a counter-attack. The champions then won a penalty of their own, which was duly converted by Nicky Maynard. Hull would now have to rely on their Yorkshire rivals Leeds United to beat third-placed Watford at Vicarage Road. A lengthy-stoppage for an injury to Watford goalkeeper Jonathan Bond meant the game in Hertfordshire was 15 minutes delayed, leaving Hull in jeopardy as they were forced to wait to find out if they had done enough for automatic promotion. With the score level at 1–1 in added time, Ross McCormack attempted to chip substitute goalkeeper Jack Bonham, and thanks to Bonham mishandling the ball, it dropped into the net, securing Leeds the win and Hull a return to the top-flight in dramatic fashion.

Following promotion, Bruce set about improving the squad so it was fit to compete in the Premier League. He started by making the loans of Elmohamady and George Boyd permanent, before signing Maynor Figueroa, Allan McGregor, and Tom Huddlestone throughout the summer transfer window, among others. Furthermore, Jake Livermore, who had made his England debut the previous year, was loaned in for the entirety of the 2013–14 campaign. The Tigers began the season slowly, but there were clear signs of progress. A 3–1 home victory over title-chasing Liverpool on 1 December 2013, and a narrow 3–2 defeat to Manchester United a few weeks later, put Hull in a good position for their upcoming home fixture against Fulham. On 28 December 2013, Hull recorded their biggest-ever Premier League win, thrashing the visitors 6–0 and lifting them into 10th place. The game is well-remembered for Huddlestone celebrating his goal (Hull's fourth), by cutting a lock of his hair for charity having promised to grow it out until his next goal. The promise had lasted two years, as Huddlestone had not scored since 20 April 2011, when playing for his old club, Tottenham Hotspur, in their 3–3 draw with arch-rivals Arsenal.

The starting line-ups for the 2014 FA Cup final

The Tigers' form dropped in January, losing all four of their league matches in the month. However, they beat Middlesbrough and later Southend United to progress to the fifth round of the FA Cup. It took two legs to defeat Championship side Brighton & Hove Albion, before a 3–0 home victory over Sunderland and an entertaining 5–3 win against Sheffield United at Wembley Stadium, saw Hull reach their first FA Cup final in history. Meanwhile, in the league they had suffered greatly since the turn of the year. Yet, despite losing their final three games of the campaign, Bruce's side avoided relegation by four points, finishing in 16th, the club's highest-ever league finish. On 17 May 2014, Hull contested the 2014 FA Cup final with Arsenal. The Gunners were the favourites heading into the game, so when James Chester broke the deadlock inside five minutes, Arsenal were stunned. Curtis Davies doubled this lead moments later, leaving the opponents on the verge of capitulation. However, manager Arsène Wenger lifted his team back off their feet and their quality eventually shone through, with Aaron Ramsey completing an incredible 3–2 comeback deep into extra-time. Hull may have been beaten finalists, but their consolation prize was a place in the following season's Europa League third qualifying round. This was because cup winners Arsenal were already set to compete in the Champions League. It would be the first time that the club competed in a major European competition.

Hull's squad would need another rebuild if it was to maintain stability in the Premier League and qualify for the group stages of the Europa League. With two signings made under Pearson leaving, the now-captain Koren and semi-prolific goalscorer Fryatt, depth was becoming a problematic issue that Bruce would need to resolve. After a successful loan spell, the first piece of business the Tigers did that summer was bringing Livermore back on a permanent deal for a reported club record fee of around £8,000,000. Not long after, Robert Snodgrass and Tom Ince arrived from Norwich City and Blackpool respectively. Then, the double signing of Harry Maguire and Andrew Robertson was announced on 29 July 2014. Two days later, Hull made their debut in European football, a 0–0 draw away to Slovak side AS Trenčín. The home leg saw their first European victory, a 2–1 win on 7 August 2014. Goals from Elmohamady and Aluko were enough to advance to the final play-off round. There, they were drawn against Belgian club K.S.C. Lokeren. However, after a 1–0 defeat in the first leg, a 2–1 win at home was not enough to progress due to the away goals rule, and Hull were eliminated from the competition.

At the end of the summer the Tigers made a flurry of new signings and loan deals. Defender Michael Dawson, Uruguayan international Abel Hernández, and midfielder Mohamed Diamé all arrived permanently in the last week of the window. Furthermore, Premier League talents Gastón Ramírez and Hatem Ben Arfa both arrived on loan. Although Hull had not been a success in Europe, they had started well back on home soil, being ninth place in the league after their goalless away draw with Liverpool on 25 October 2014. However, by the time Bruce signed his second three-year deal with the club on 11 March 2015, they had dropped to 15th and were just sat above a relegation dogfight. The situation soon became uncomfortable and Hull slipped into the relegation zone, before having their fate sealed on the final day after drawing 0–0 at home to Manchester United, with other results failing to go their way.

Bruce stayed in spite of relegation and largely managed to keep the same squad going into the 2015–16 season. After the 2–0 victory away at Brentford on 3 November 2015, Hull found themselves atop of the Championship table. This came a week after their League Cup penalty-shootout win over eventual Premier League champions Leicester City, which took the Tigers to their first-ever quarter-final appearance in the competition. That appearance, on 1 December 2015, saw Manchester City beat Hull 4–1 at the Etihad Stadium. Coincidentally, the Citizens would go on to win the cup later that season. Hull would also taste glory in the 2015–16 campaign, overcoming Derby County 3–2 on aggregate in the semi-finals of the Championship play-offs. In the final, on 28 May 2016, a long-range effort from Diamé was enough to beat Sheffield Wednesday, securing the Tigers an immediate return to the top-flight.

=== Supporter unrest and steady decline (2016–2020) ===
On 22 July 2016, Bruce resigned from his position as manager due to an alleged rift with the club's owners and Mike Phelan was appointed interim manager. Steve Bruce's four-year tenure as Hull City manager was one of the most successful in the Tigers’ history, as his team achieved two promotions to the Premier League, including the club's highest-ever league finish, as well as an FA Cup final and European football. By the summer of 2016, supporters had already become frustrated and disillusioned with the Allam family's ownership of the club, mainly due to the failed suggestion for the club to be rebranded as Hull Tigers.

Fans' desires for the club to be sold only increased after Bruce's resignation, and worries about the upcoming season were made more apparent by the fact that there had been no new first team signings since promotion. It was that point in particular that garnered the attention of social media and national news outlets after nine of the 13 remaining fit senior players at the club jokingly posed for a squad photo whilst on their pre-season tour of Austria. At the time of the photo, Diamé, who had scored Hull's promotion-winning goal just over two months earlier, had left the club to join Newcastle United, whilst a permanent replacement for Bruce was still yet to be found. An approach for Wales boss Chris Coleman had reportedly been made, in response to him guiding his nation to the semi-finals of Euro 2016 earlier that summer, however, this was abruptly blocked by the Welsh FA.

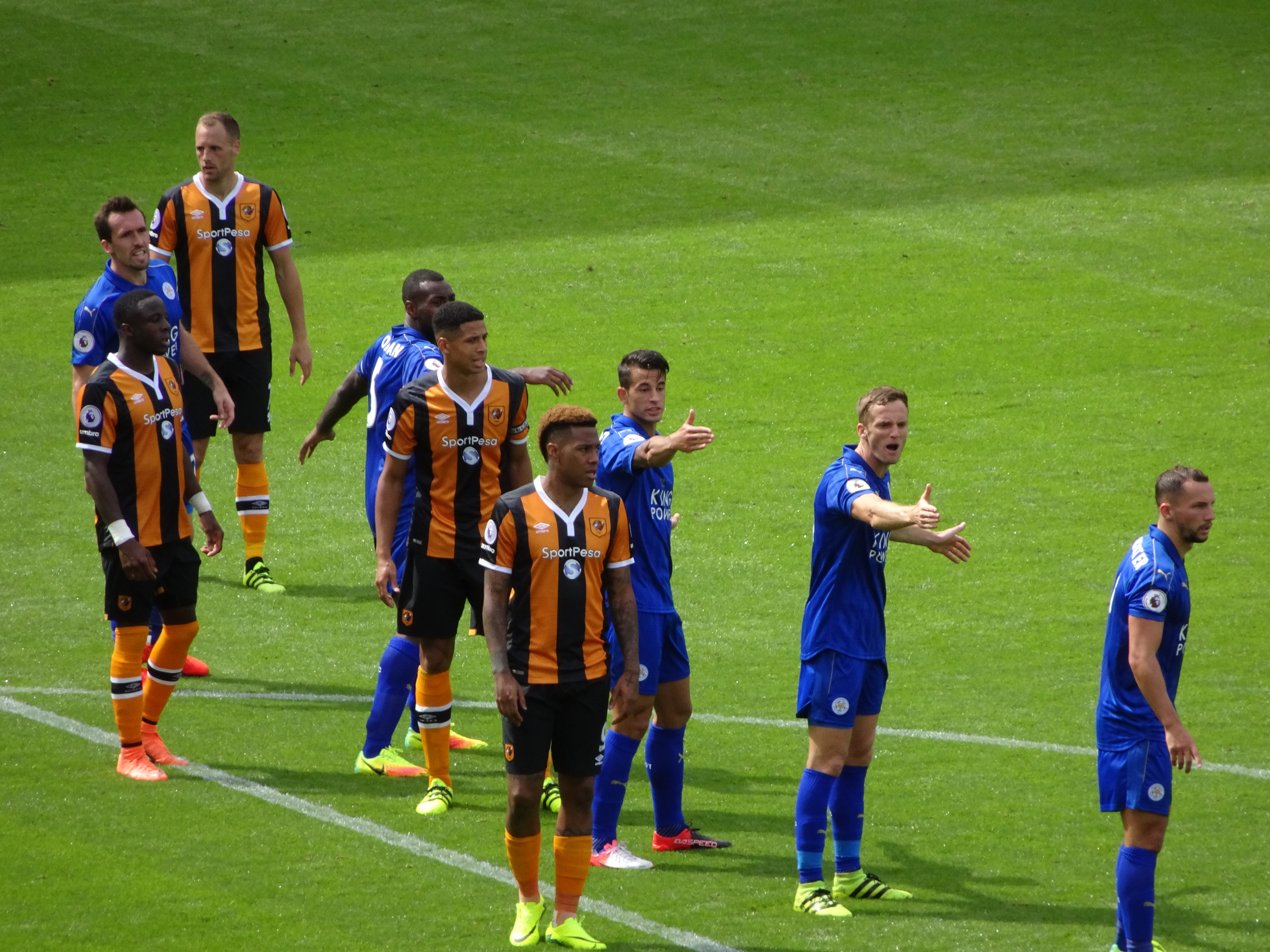
Hull City 2–1 Leicester City, 2016

By the time the 2016–17 season was underway, Phelan was still in charge as interim manager. Despite low attendances at home games in protest of the Allams' ownership, on-pitch results were surprisingly good considering the club's uncomfortable situation. This was highlighted by an unlikely opening day 2–1 win at home to Leicester City, the reigning Premier League champions at the time. Although good results continued until September, Hull's form drastically dipped. Despite this, on 13 October 2016, Phelan became Hull's permanent head coach, but was sacked less than 3 months later, on 3 January 2017, after little improvement. Two days later, Marco Silva was appointed as the club's new manager, but he was unable prevent relegation at the end of the season.

Following relegation Silva resigned, and on 9 June 2017, the club announced Leonid Slutsky as the new head coach. He would not last long in Hull though, with the Russian leaving by mutual consent on 3 December 2017 after a poor run of results. He was replaced by former Southampton boss Nigel Adkins, who led the team to avoid relegation and finish 18th at the end of the season. Despite being in the relegation zone after 19 games of the following season, the 2018–19 campaign, an upturn in form saw the Tigers finish in 13th place. However, Adkins resigned at the end of the season after rejecting a new contract.

On 21 June 2019, Hull appointed Grant McCann as head coach on a one-year rolling contract. The Tigers began the 2019–20 season well, finding themselves in 8th place after a 1–0 away win over Sheffield Wednesday on 1 January 2020. However, McCann's reliance on wingers Jarrod Bowen and Kamil Grosicki would prove fatal after both were sold by the end of that month's transfer window. Bowen in particular was crucial to the team's success, having scored 16 goals in 29 games so far that campaign prior to his move to West Ham United. In a season delayed due to the COVID-19 pandemic, Hull lost 16 of their last 20 games, a run that included the club's joint-worst league defeat ever, when they lost 8–0 away at Wigan Athletic. On 22 July 2020, after losing 3–0 away to Cardiff City, Hull were relegated to League One. It would be the first time the club had played in the third tier of English football in 15 years.

=== Return to the Championship, new ownership and return to the Premier League (2020–present) ===
Despite relegation, McCann continued as head coach for the 2020–21 season. This decision would prove successful, as Hull were promoted back to the Championship at the first time of asking. After a 2–1 victory away at Lincoln City on 24 April 2021, promotion was confirmed. A week later, on the final day of the campaign, a 3–1 win at home to Wigan Athletic saw the Tigers crowned League One champions. It was only the fourth-ever league title that the club had won, and the most recent since the victorious 1965–66 Third Division campaign, 55 years prior.

On 19 January 2022, Turkish media mogul Acun Ilıcalı and his company Acun Medya completed a takeover of Hull City, ending the club's controversial 11-year ownership under the Allam family. On 25 January 2022, Grant McCann was sacked, but he was quickly replaced by Shota Arveladze as the new head coach two days later. The former Georgia international helped Hull achieve Championship survival in the 2021–22 season in relatively comfortable fashion, before he too was sacked, on 30 September 2022, after four consecutive league defeats.

On 3 November 2022, the club announced former player, Liam Rosenior, as head coach, on a two-and-a-half-year deal. Having strengthened both the team's defensive record and the team's away record since his arrival, Rosenior guided Hull to a 15th-placed finish at the end of the 2022–23 season. Despite Rosenior overseeing a very positive 2023–24 campaign, one where he was nominated for the EFL Championship Manager of the Season award and had brought the Tigers within three points of a play-off place, he was sacked on 7 May 2024. Owner Ilıcalı swiftly explained that Rosenior had been dismissed on good terms and that the departure was due to a difference in "football philosophy", with the Englishman unwilling to play the aggressive attacking style that Ilıcalı was demanding.

With Rosenior sacked, much of the previous season's playing squad left. Among these, young talents Jacob Greaves and Jaden Philogene were now considered ready for the Premier League, and were soon bought by Ipswich Town and Aston Villa respectively. Other notable losses were the end of loans for Fábio Carvalho, Liam Delap, and Tyler Morton, whilst cult hero Ozan Tufan returned to his native Turkey with Trabzonspor. Greg Docherty and Matt Ingram, both key members of the squad who won promotion from League One in 2021, also left.

During this period of transition, Tim Walter was appointed as Rosenior's replacement, beginning his new role on 1 July 2024. However, he was removed from his post on 27 November 2024, after enduring a league run of four straight defeats and nine games without a win. At the time, Hull were 22nd in the Championship, sat just inside the relegation zone. On 6 December 2024, Rubén Sellés was appointed as head coach of the club on a two-and-a-half-year deal, taking up his new role on 9 December. Sellés was able to stave off relegation after a final day 1–1 draw away at Portsmouth, but it did not save his job. He was dismissed on 15 May 2025, before being replaced by Bosnian coach Sergej Jakirović on 11 June.

In the 2025–26 season, Hull had been in a play-off slot for the majority of the season but dropped out of the play-off positions following a 2–1 loss to Charlton Athletic in the penultimate game of the season. A 2–1 win over high-flying Norwich City on the final day of the regular season coupled with Wrexham's 2–2 draw with Middlesbrough. gave them a 6th place finish. In the play-off semi-finals Hull faced Millwall. The first leg was an uneventful stalemate, but a 0–2 win at The Den secured a place at Wembley. They were set to meet Southampton who beat Middlesbrough, the first leg finished 0–0, while the second leg ended 2–1 to Southampton and also 2–1 on aggregate, sending Southampton through to the final. However, following the 'Spygate' scandal, Southampton were disqualified, and Middlesbrough were reinstated into the final. Hull prevailed with a 95th minute Oli McBurnie winner and gained promotion to the Premier League.

== Identity ==
=== Club colours ===
Traditional home colours
1935–36 home colours
1946–47 home colours

Hull City's traditional home colours are black and amber. There is a prevalent myth that the club's earliest kits featured plain white shirts with black shorts and socks. In reality, the Tigers wore black and amber striped shirts, with black shorts and socks right from the very beginning. This is highlighted by Hull Daily Mail coining the club's nickname in March 1905, which came as a response to the kit colours.

Aside from design changes, only a handful of occasions have seen Hull's strip altered in the years since. White shorts were introduced in the early 1920s, before a more dramatic, wholesale change was made for the 1935–36 season. Blue shirts, white shorts, and blue and white hooped socks suddenly became the club's new home kit, likely to match the civic colours of Kingston upon Hull. However, this strip was short-lived, as it was abandoned the following season for a return to black and amber.

Ahead of the restart of football after the Second World War, the limited supplies of dye, thanks to rationing restrictions, left the club with little choice but to return to blue shirts, albeit they were much paler than they had been a decade before. Worn with white shorts and black socks, the kit was only used in the 1946–47 season.

Although once again returning to black and amber, Hull's home shirt was slightly different in the post-war era. The Tigers' iconic stripes had been dropped in favour of plain amber shirts with minimal black trim. This was until the early 1960s, when stripes were reintroduced on a semi-regular basis. The club even debuted an all-amber strip for the 1964–65 campaign, but this was unpopular amongst supporters, and consequently retired at the end of the season. In the mid-1970s, both stripes and white shorts made welcome returns.

The next notable development in Hull's home kits was the addition of red trim in the 1980s, whose duration went no further than this. Eccentric print designs became commonplace in the 1990s, and Hull's 1992–93 home shirt was one of the more extreme examples. Its all-over tiger-print design divided opinions and has since featured in lists for some of the best and worst kits of all time. In the 21st century, the club have worn all sorts of designs, although usually they are either striped black and amber shirts or simply plain amber shirts along with black shorts and socks.

In 2024, a commemorative all-black strip, with gold trim, was worn for the club's 120th anniversary, in a fixture against Cardiff City. Precisely 1,904 shirts were available for fan purchase, as a nod to the club's founding year.

=== Club crest ===
1998–2001 club crest

2014–2019 club crest

In their early history, Hull City had no crest. One was eventually introduced in the form of the three civic crowns of Kingston upon Hull, which was first embroidered onto the club's shirts for the 1935–36 season, matching their new, city-honouring blue and white kit colours. Their next crest was the inception of the club's first tiger head, featuring inside an amber shield for the 1947–48 campaign, having returned to black and amber kits the same year.

Variations of the tiger's head were used for the next 28 years, before the club's initials, 'HCAFC', were adopted as the official crest for the upcoming 1975–76 season. That same year, the now-iconic tiger's head was granted as a heraldic badge by the College of Arms to the English Football League. After four years of using the club's initials, the crest reverted to the tiger's head ahead of the 1979–80 season.

The tiger's head has been used ever since, appearing in various forms and often joined by the club's name and founding year, among other features. Before the 2014–15 campaign, the crest was changed to just the tiger's head and '1904' inscribed beneath it, all inside an amber shield. This crest was strongly disliked by supporters for dropping the club's name, and a supporter-led redesign began after the close of the 2017–18 season. The process was finally concluded in February 2019, when a new crest was unveiled. It was used from the start of the 2019–20 season.

=== Kit manufacturers ===
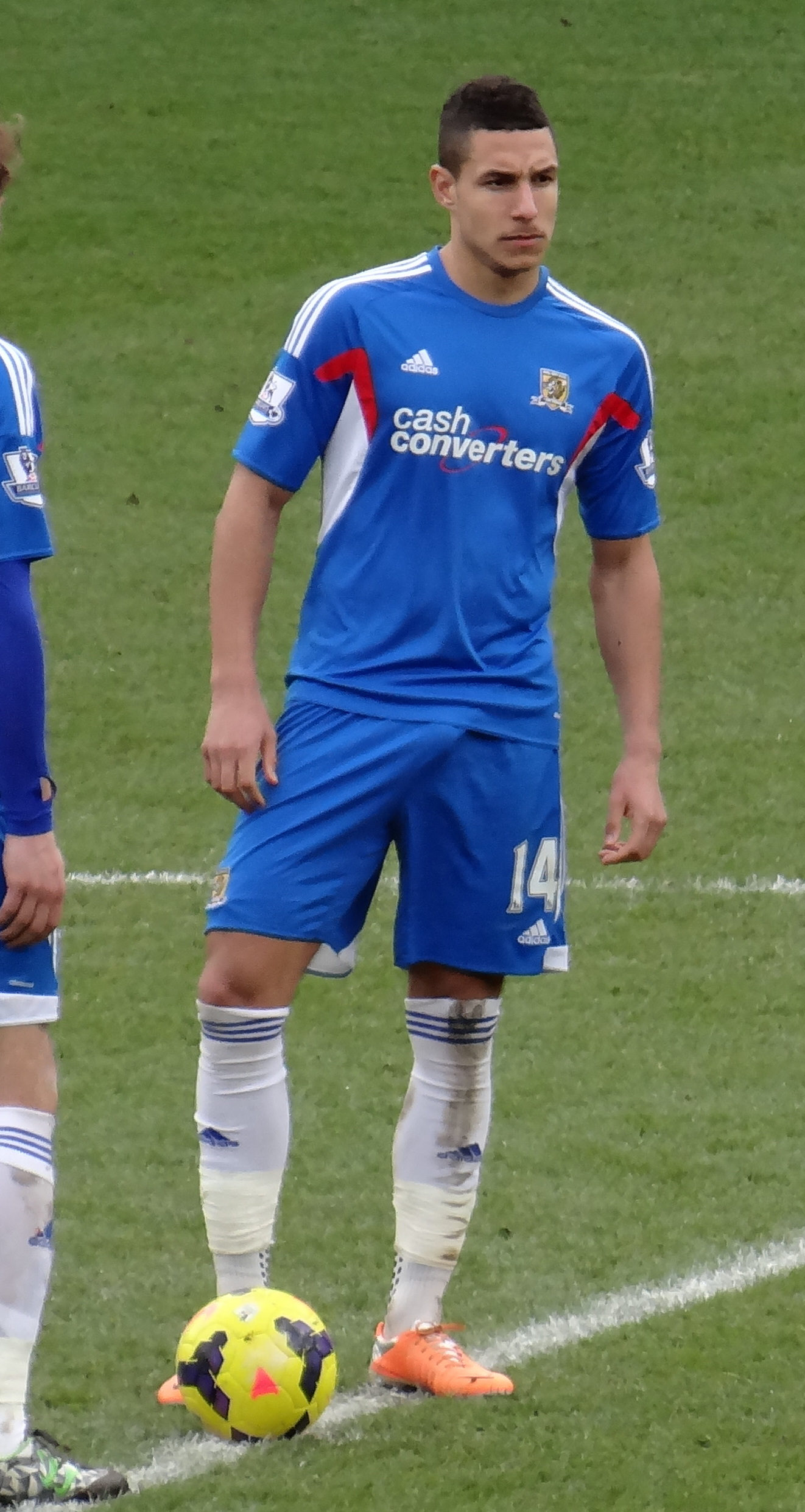
The 2013–14 away kit, manufactured by Adidas and sponsored by Cash Converters

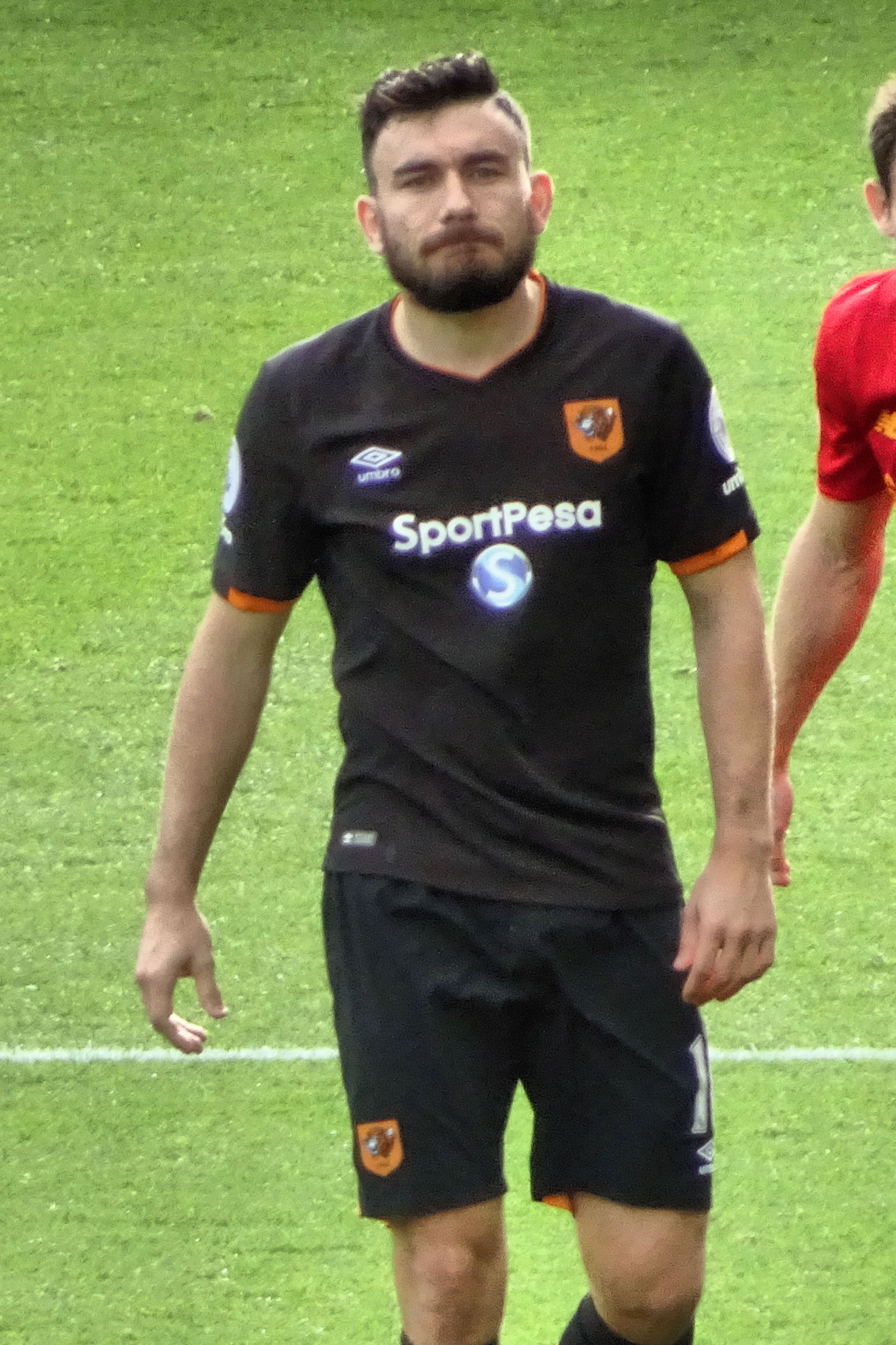
The 2016–17 away kit, manufactured by Umbro and sponsored by SportPesa

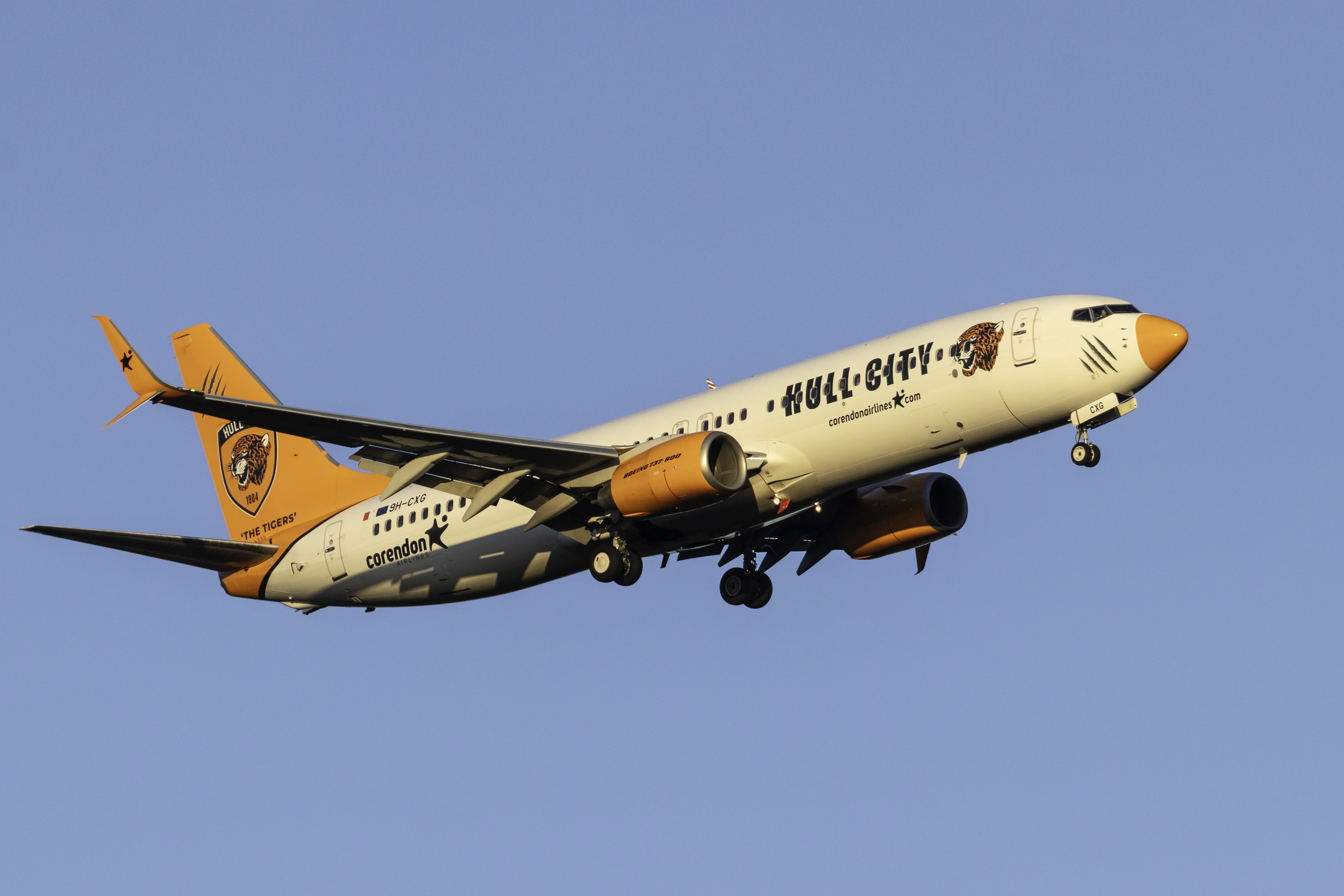
Corendon Airlines began sponsoring the club in 2022

Manufacturer	Period	Ref.
(United Kingdom) Europa Sports	1975–1980	
(Germany) Adidas	1980–1982	
(United Kingdom) Admiral	1982–1988	
(United Kingdom) Matchwinner	1988–1993	
(United Kingdom) Pelada	1993–1995	
(United Kingdom) Super League	1995–1998	–
(Belgium) Olympic Sports	1998–1999	
(United Kingdom) Avec Sport	1999–2001	
(Belgium) Patrick	2001–2004	
(Italy) Diadora	2004–2007	
(United Kingdom) Umbro	2007–2010	
(Germany) Adidas	2010–2014	
(United Kingdom) Umbro	2014–2023	
(Italy) Kappa	2023–2026	
(United Kingdom) Oxen Sports	2026–Present	

=== Kit Sponsors ===
Sponsor	Period	Ref.
(United Kingdom) Hygena	1983–1984	
(United States) Arrow Air	1984–1985	
(United Kingdom) Twydale Turkeys	1985–1987	
(United Kingdom) Mansfield Beers	1987–1988	–
(United Kingdom) Riding Bitter	1988–1989	–
(United Kingdom) Dale Farm	1989–1990	–
(United Kingdom) Bonus Electrical	1990–1993	–
(United Kingdom) Pepis	1993–1994	–
(United Kingdom) Needler's	1994–1995	–
(United Kingdom) IBC	1995–1997	–
(United Kingdom) University of Hull	1997–1999	–
(United Kingdom) IBC	1999–2001	–
(United Kingdom) Sportscard	2001–2002	–
(United Kingdom) Bonus Electrical	2002–2007	–
(United Kingdom) Karoo	2007–2009	–
(United Kingdom) totesport	2009–2011	–
(Australia) Cash Converters	2011–2014	–
(Curaçao) 12BET	2014–2015	–
(United Kingdom) Flamingo Land	2015–2016	
(Kenya) SportPesa	2016–2020	
(United Kingdom) Giacom	2020–2022	
(Turkey) Corendon Airlines	2022–Present	

=== Name change ===
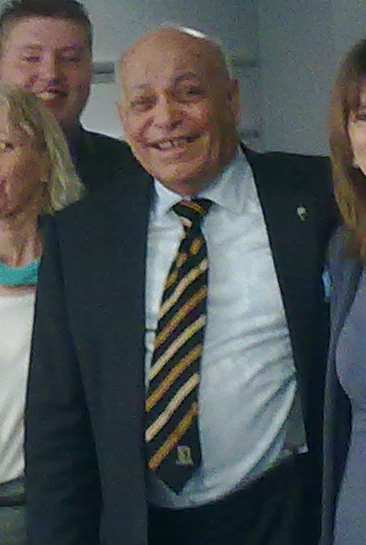
Assem Allam, owner of Hull City between 2010 and 2022

==== 2013: Initial application ====
In August 2013, owner Assem Allam announced that the club had re-registered as "Hull City Tigers Ltd," and that the team would be marketed as "Hull City Tigers," removing the "Association Football Club" that had been part of the name since the club's formation in 1904. Vice-chairman Ehab Allam said "AFC" would remain on the club badge for the 2013–14 season, but be removed after.

In response, a Premier League spokesman said, "We have not been informed of a change in the name of the actual club. They will still be known as Hull City as far as the Premier League is concerned when results or fixtures are published."

According to its chairman, by 2014, the club would be further renamed "Hull Tigers," because, as he claimed, "in marketing, the shorter the name the more powerful [it is]," while "Association Football Club" made the name too long. Allam stated he dislikes the word "City", as it is too "common" and a "lousy identity", since it is also associated with other clubs, such as Leicester City, Bristol City and Manchester City. He told David Conn of The Guardian that "in a few years many clubs will follow and change their names to something more interesting and I will have proved I am a leader," adding that if he were the owner of Manchester City, he would change their name to "Manchester Hunter."

Allam justified the intended name change as part of his plans to create "additional sources of revenue" for the club, after Hull City Council refused to sell him the stadium freehold so he could develop, as he had stated, "a sports park" on the site. The council has refused to sell in order, as they stated, "to preserve the annual Hull Fair held on the adjacent car park." After the collapse of the negotiations, Allam stated: "I had in mind £30 million to spend on the infrastructure of the club, to increase the stadium by 10,000 and to have commercial activities around the stadium — cafeterias, shops, supermarkets — to have all this to create income for the club so that in the future it can be self-financing and not relying on me." He asked rhetorically, "What if I dropped dead tomorrow?"

Supporters' groups expressed opposition to the name change. Bernard Noble, chairman of Hull City's official supporters club said he was disappointed, although he agreed that Allam had saved the club from liquidation and that it was "his club". Blogger Rick Skelton called the name change "a pointless exercise" and said, "Mr Allam's assertion that the name 'Hull City' is irrelevant and too common, is as disgusting a use of the English language as his new name for the club." Before the first home match of the season on 24 August 2013, a group of supporters marched in protest against the name change. Allam dismissed complaints by fans.

In a comment published on 1 December 2013 in The Independent in response to supporters' chants and banners of "City Till We Die", Allam said, "They can die as soon as they want, as long as they leave the club for the majority who just want to watch good football." The supporters responded with chants of "We're Hull City, we'll die when we want" during that day's home match against Liverpool. Manager Steve Bruce credited the controversy for creating " a fantastic atmosphere" but added, "I have got to have a conversation with him because I don't think he quite understands what it means in terms of history and tradition." However, Bruce also said that, because of the money Allam had invested in the club, "If he thinks Hull Tigers is his way forward then we have to respect it."

On 11 December 2013, a spokesman for Hull City announced that the club had formally applied to the Football Association to have its name changed to "Hull Tigers" from the 2014–15 season onwards. The FA Council, which has "absolute discretion" in deciding whether to approve the plan or not, stated the next day that it would follow a "consultation process" with stakeholders, "including the club's supporter groups".

==== 2014: Resistance and rejection ====
Some brand and marketing experts came out in support of the name change. Simon Chadwick, professor of Sport Business Strategy and Marketing at the Coventry University Business School, cautiously opined that the objective of opening up lucrative new markets for shirt sales, merchandise and broadcast deals shows commercial vision and could bring benefits. David Stern, commissioner of the National Basketball Association in the United States, warned: "I would say a wise owner [of a sports club] would view his ownership as something of a public trust, in addition to the profit motive, and you really do want to allow the fans a little bit more input than I think is being allowed, with respect to Hull."

On 17 March 2014, the FA membership committee advised that the reapplication be rejected at the FA Council meeting on 9 April. In response, the club published a statement saying the FA was "prejudiced", and criticised the committee's consultation with the City Till We Die opposition group. The following week, the club opened a ballot of season ticket holders over the name change. Opponents of the name change criticised as "loaded" the questions, which asked respondents to choose between "Yes to Hull Tigers with the Allam family continuing to lead the club", "No to Hull Tigers" and "I am not too concerned and will continue to support the club either way", on the grounds that voters were not given the option to reject the name while keeping the Allam family as owners. Of 15,033 season ticket holders, 5,874 voted in all, with 2,565 voting in favour of the change and 2,517 against, while 792 chose the "not too concerned" option.

On 9 April 2014, the FA Council announced its decision, carried by a 63.5% vote of its members, to reject the club's application for a name change. The club's owner, Assam Allem, responded by stating it would appeal the decision. However, since there was no appeal process with the FA and its council, the decision was final. On 11 September 2014, Allam mentioned that an appeal against the FA's ruling was being sent to the Court of Arbitration for Sport. He also held a news conference confirming the club had been put up for sale due to the English FA's decision on 9 April 2014.

In October 2014, interviewed by the BBC, Allam confirmed that he would "not invest a penny more in the club" unless he is allowed to change the club's name to Hull Tigers. In the same interview, Allam said, "I have never been a football fan. I am still not a football fan. I am a community fan."

==== 2015: Re-application ====
In March 2015, an independent panel appointed by the Court of Arbitration for Sport ruled that the decision of the Football Association Council to block the name change was invalidated by flaws in the process.

In July 2015, the Football Supporters Federation confirmed that a 70/30 decision was made in favour of Hull City A.F.C. not changing their name after an FA vote.

=== Grounds ===
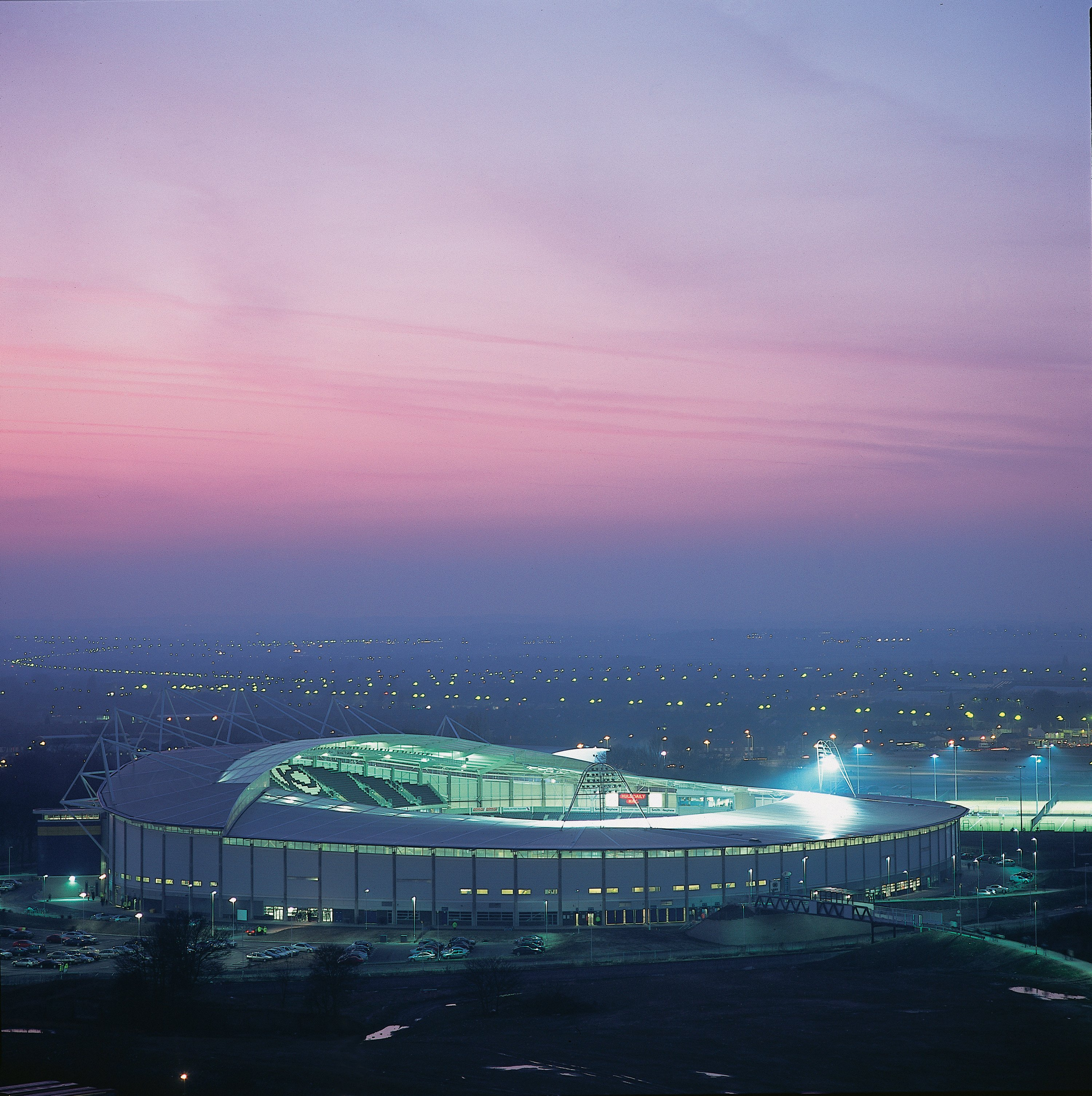
MKM Stadium

Hull City initially played their home games at rugby league ground, the Boulevard, before briefly relocating to the Circle, a local cricket ground. Eventually, Anlaby Road would be built to become the club's first permanent home, opening in March 1906. The Tigers played there until they were forced to suspend their operations in 1941 due to the Second World War.

When league football resumed in 1946, Hull moved into the newly built Boothferry Park. First planned in 1929, the stadium had seen slow development due to financial difficulty and the impact of the war on the city, particularly the Hull Blitz. In 1951, Boothferry Halt railway station opened to serve supporters travelling to the stadium. It would ultimately close in 1986 because of safety concerns.

Boothferry Park would be the Tigers' home for 56 years before they left for the new KC Stadium in December 2002. By this time, the old ground had fallen into disrepair and the Taylor Report had enforced its ruling that clubs in the top two divisions of English football must have all-seater stadiums. Although Hull fell outside the restrictions at the time, playing in the fourth tier, it showed the club's ambition to progress.

City were joined at the new ground by Hull F.C. of the Super League. In 2006, the stadium was named "Best Ground" at the inaugural EFL Awards. When its sponsor, the KCOM Group, rebranded in 2016, the stadium was renamed to the KCOM Stadium. It was again renamed in 2021, becoming the MKM Stadium when MKM Building Supplies bought the stadium's naming rights.

=== Rivalries ===
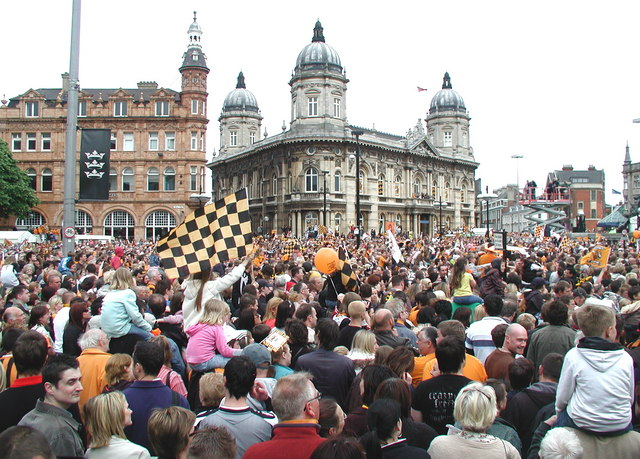
Hull City supporters at the celebrations on the team's promotion to the Premier League in 2008

Hull City are one of very few clubs in English football to have no clear rival. They do contest the Humber derby with both Grimsby Town and Scunthorpe United, however Hull supporters tend to see Leeds United as bigger opponents than either of the two Lincolnshire teams. On the other hand, Leeds fans consider Manchester United as their main rivals, with whom they contest the Roses rivalry. Additionally, both Lincoln City and York City fans hold unrequited beliefs that Hull are their main rivals.

Some older Hull supporters also view Sheffield United as minor rivals. This dates back to the 1983–84 season, when the Blades won promotion at Hull's expense. The teams had ended up level on points and goal difference; however, the Tigers had scored an inferior number of goals. Furthermore, 33 of the South Yorkshire side's goals had been scored by former Hull striker Keith Edwards. To make matters worse, Hull had even had fate in their own hands ahead of their final game of the season away at Burnley. The match had been rescheduled due to bad weather, and so took place after the rest of the league had finished their campaigns. Knowing they had to win by more than two goals, they could only manage a 2–0 victory in front of a crowd which included a number of Sheffield United fans, and lost out on promotion in agonising fashion.

=== Supporters ===
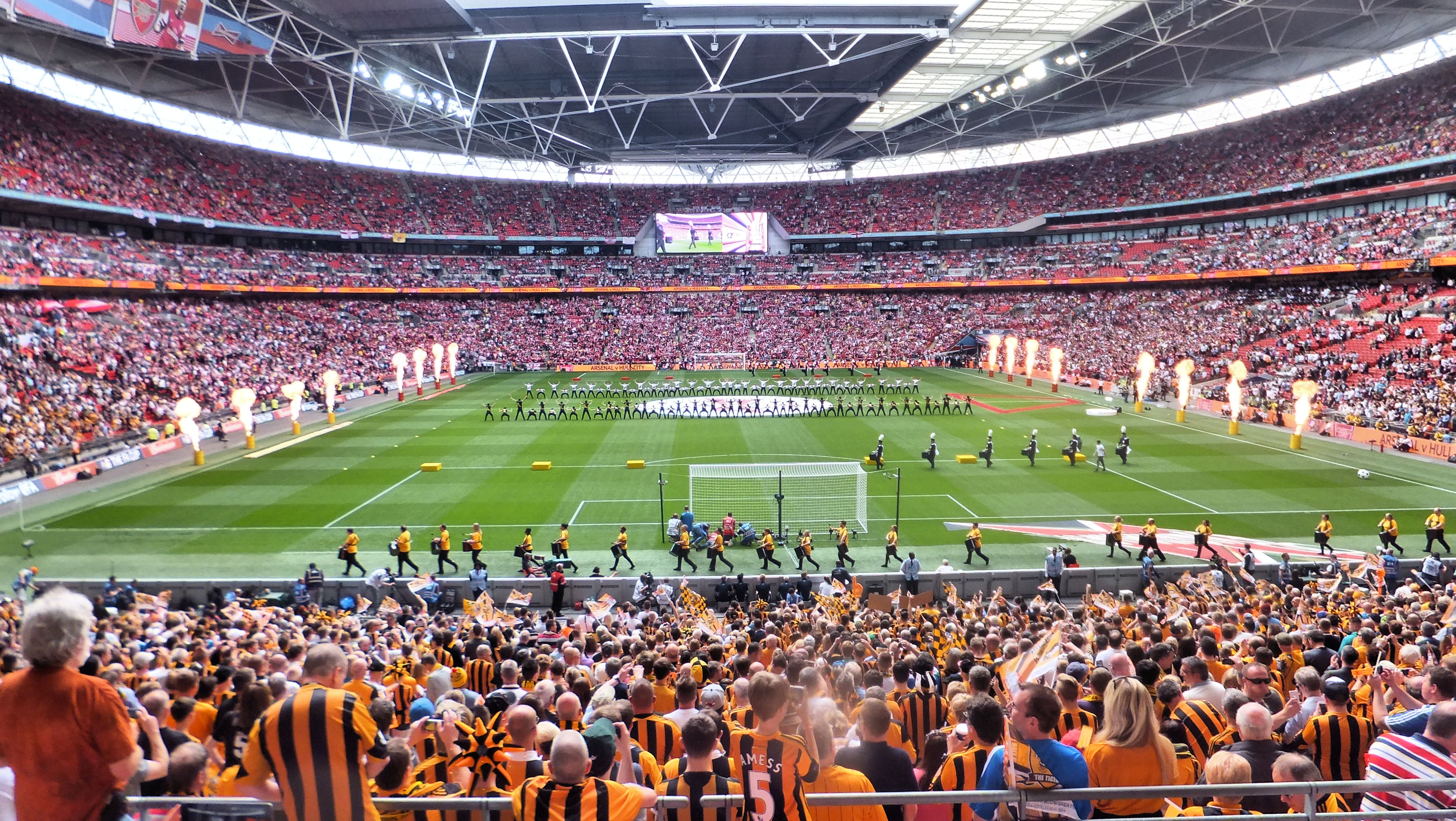
Hull City supporters prior to the 2014 FA Cup final against Arsenal

Hull City have a handful of notable celebrity fans. Among them are decorated actors Tom Courtenay and Omar Sharif. Courtenay was born and raised in the local area, and introduced Sharif to the Tigers when the two became friends in the 1960s. Sharif would reportedly follow the team via the television at his home in Paris. If at any time he was not there and a match was being played, he would instead telephone the club's automated phoneline for score updates. The Egyptian was later awarded an honorary degree from the University of Hull in 2010. Alongside Courtenay, he also became good friends with ex-player Ken Wagstaff. Coincidentally, Courtenay had previously owned a Dalmatian named “Waggy” as a tribute to the forward.

John Prescott, who was the Deputy Prime Minister of the United Kingdom from 1997 to 2007, became a supporter after spending most of his life in Hull. After graduating from the University of Hull in his youth, he would go on to represent the Labour Party in Hull East for nearly 40 years. Following his death in 2024, Prescott's funeral service was conducted at Hull Minster. Mark Herman, best known for writing and directing the 2008 film The Boy in the Striped Pyjamas, is another Hull supporter, having been born in nearby Bridlington. His schoolfriend, actor Henry Priestman, is also a fan of the club. The pair have even worked together to create two songs about the Tigers, as well as a short documentary film. Roy North, an actor and television presenter who is best known for being the companion of Basil Brush between 1973 and 1976, sometimes wore the Tigers' home shirts during broadcasts to show his love for his hometown club. Elsewhere in entertainment, playwright and screenwriter Alan Plater grew up locally, having been born in Jarrow, and became a Hull supporter as a result. The youngest person to run the length of Great Britain is also a Hull fan. In May 2025, Marcus Skeet, who reflects his loyalties in his online alias as The Hull Boy, was just over 17 years old when he completed the journey in only 58 days. British-American singer Sinitta began supporting Hull after being convinced to follow them through an ex-boyfriend who came from the area. Another Tigers' fan from the music industry is Stephen Malkmus, lead singer of the band Pavement. Malkmus, although born and raised in California, adopted Hull as his team after some of his band's technical crew introduced him to their local side.

Aside from celebrity fans, the club is believed to have had a hooligan firm which dates back to the 1960s. As noted by Andy Nicholls and Nick Lowles, in their book Hooligans: The A–L of Britain's Football Hooligan Gangs, they were known as the Hull City Psychos.

=== Music ===
Like several other clubs around England, Hull City have adopted the 1961 Elvis Presley song "Can't Help Falling in Love" as a pre-match anthem. This originates from 20 August 1977, when Hull faced Sunderland at home in the league. It was just four days after Presley had died, and so both sets of supporters sang the song in his honour. Since then, the two clubs have continued to play it before home games. Also used by Hull before home kick-offs is a unique mash-up track. Beginning with a dramatic reciting of the 1794 William Blake poem "The Tyger" over "Carmina Burana" by Carl Orff, it transitions into the 1999 Fatboy Slim song "Right Here, Right Now". Finally, as the teams walk onto the pitch, the 1982 Survivor song "Eye of the Tiger" is played. Within the stands, Hull supporters are perhaps most well known for their popular chant of "You're getting mauled by the Tigers!", which is regularly sung when the team are winning. However, it often faces ridicule from opposing fanbases due to its "cringeworthy" nature.

In February 1983, amidst the club's 1982–83 promotion campaign, celebrity fans Henry Priestman and Mark Herman released a song titled "The Tigers are Back". Working under the pseudonyms of 'Harry Amber' and 'Mark Black' (together as 'Amber and Black'), the track featured backing vocals provided by various members of the Hull squad. This was done to help raise funds in order to pay the players' wages, as the club were suffering financially at the time. Herman reworded the song "Out of Luck" by Priestman's previous band Yachts, to get the lyrics. Both the record sleeves and the records themselves contained the logo of the fictional record label 'Don Records' alongside the fictional issue number 'COL001'. These were in tribute to Don Robinson and Colin Appleton, who, at the time, were the club's chairman and manager respectively. Exactly 25 years later, during another promotion campaign, this time the 2007–08 season, 'Amber and Black' (now stylised as 'Amber & Black') returned to record a new song. "The City's on Fire" released on MySpace on 1 January 2008. It was later re-released just before the 2014 FA Cup final.

== Finances ==
In the club's annual report for the 12-month period up to 31 July 2009, auditors Deloitte stated that £4.4 million had gone out of the club and stadium company to owner Russell Bartlett's holding companies in loans, while at least £2.9 million of it was used in the take-over itself of the club. A further £560,000 was paid, according to the audit, by the stadium company to Bartlett's holding companies in "management fees," while at least £1 million was owed to him personally as a "salary". After the warning from Deloitte, Bartlett gave the club a £4 million loan, "which brought the money he had taken out and put in since taking over to about even."

The corporate entity that owns the football club, "The Hull City Association Football Club (Tigers) Ltd," is currently owned by Allamhouse Limited, a private, limited-liability company with a share capital of £10 million (as of October 2012), registered in Jersey. The beneficial owners of Allamhouse Limited, established in 2009, are the Allam family.

On an "Opacity Score" out of 100, where zero indicates complete openness and 100 complete secrecy, the company which owns the club has been rated by Christian Aid at 87.

Hull City's corporate accounts, as of July 2013, showed a £25.6 million loss, on revenues of £11 million, after player and management costs of "just under £23 million." The club has "future tax losses" available of more than £45 million. Another Assam Allam company, Allam Marine, also wholly owned by Allamhouse Limited, revealed in its 2012 accounts that "utilisation of tax losses from group companies" reduced its tax liability by £3.8 million over 2011 and 2012.

As reported, HM Revenue and Customs are in the process of an inquiry at Hull City AFC, as part of the British tax authorities' targeting of football clubs over "tax-free payments to players under image rights' deals and the provision of benefits in kind. For Hull City AFC, the provision for benefits in kind was reported at £682,000 as of July 2011, growing to £810,000 by July 2012.

== Players ==
=== Current squad ===
As of 9 September 2026

Note: Flags indicate national team as defined under FIFA eligibility rules; some limited exceptions apply. Players may hold more than one non-FIFA nationality.

No.	Pos.	Nation	Player
1	GK	ENG	Jack Butland
2	DF	ENG	Lewie Coyle (captain)
3	DF	ENG	Ryan Giles
4	DF	ENG	Charlie Hughes (vice-captain)
5	MF	JPN	Hidemasa Morita
6	DF	NGR	Semi Ajayi
7	FW	WAL	Sorba Thomas
8	MF	BEL	Eliot Matazo
9	FW	SCO	Oli McBurnie
10	FW	ALG	Mohamed Belloumi
11	MF	ENG	Joe Gelhardt
12	GK	ENG	Dillon Phillips
14	MF	NOR	Jens Hjertø-Dahl
15	DF	IRL	John Egan
17	DF	NIR	Paddy McNair
18	DF	ENG	Brooke Norton-Cuffy
19	GK	GRE	Konstantinos Tzolakis

No.	Pos.	Nation	Player
20	MF	ECU	Óscar Zambrano
21	FW	SWE	Elliot Stroud
22	DF	AUS	Lucas Herrington
23	DF	ENG	Matt Targett
24	MF	ENG	Darko Gyabi
25	MF	ENG	Matt Crooks
26	MF	ENG	Kieran Dowell
27	MF	ENG	Regan Slater
28	FW	GER	Ilyas Ansah
29	MF	FRA	Lucas Gourna-Douath
32	DF	SEN	Nobel Mendy
33	MF	TUR	Abdülkadir Ömür
36	MF	GRE	Christos Mouzakitis
42	MF	ENG	Tim Iroegbunam
47	FW	FRA	Robinio Vaz (on loan from Roma)
50	FW	FRA	Mohamed-Ali Cho

==== Out on loan ====
As of 2 September 2026

Note: Flags indicate national team as defined under FIFA eligibility rules; some limited exceptions apply. Players may hold more than one non-FIFA nationality.

No.	Pos.	Nation	Player
—	DF	ENG	Matty Jacob (on loan at Newport County)
—	GK	ENG	Harvey Cartwright (on loan at Grimsby Town)
—	FW	ENG	Mason Burstow (on loan at Sheffield Wednesday)
—	FW	CAN	Liam Millar (on loan at Birmingham City)
—	GK	FRA	Thimothée Lo-Tutala (on loan at Colchester United)

=== Under-21s ===
As of 3 September 2026

Note: Flags indicate national team as defined under FIFA eligibility rules; some limited exceptions apply. Players may hold more than one non-FIFA nationality.

No.	Pos.	Nation	Player
43	DF	IRL	Stan Ashbee
54	DF	ENG	Ed Devine
55	GK	ENG	Archie Howard
—	DF	NIR	George Goodman
—	FW	WAL	Zac Jagielka
—	DF	ENG	Charlie Leach

No.	Pos.	Nation	Player
—	MF	ENG	Alfie Maskell
—	MF	ENG	Josh Ocaya
—	DF	ENG	Ben Robinson
—	GK	ENG	Khiani Shombe
—	MF	ENG	Reuben Silk
—	FW	SCO	Kieran Wilson

==== Out on loan ====
As of 3 September 2026

Note: Flags indicate national team as defined under FIFA eligibility rules; some limited exceptions apply. Players may hold more than one non-FIFA nationality.

No.	Pos.	Nation	Player
41	FW	ENG	Tyrell Sellars-Fleming (on loan at Scunthorpe United)
48	DF	NGR	Calvin Okike (on loan at Greenock Morton)
52	FW	IRL	Hugh Parker (on loan at Scunthorpe United)
58	DF	IRL	Cathal McCarthy (on loan at Kilmarnock)
—	FW	ENG	Ramell Carter (on loan at Worthing)
—	DF	ENG	James Debayo (on loan at Swindon Town)
—	MF	ENG	Nathan Tinsdale (on loan at Crawley Town)

=== Under-18s ===
As of 16 August 2026

Note: Flags indicate national team as defined under FIFA eligibility rules; some limited exceptions apply. Players may hold more than one non-FIFA nationality.

No.	Pos.	Nation	Player
—	FW	FRA	George Akinniranye
—	MF	ENG	Alex Edey
—	FW	ENG	Ted Gode
—	DF	UKR	Sasha Gomeniuk
—	FW	ENG	Albert Matique
—	DF	ENG	Bobby Moore

No.	Pos.	Nation	Player
—	GK	SCO	Kerr Reynolds
—	DF	ENG	Dellan Robinson
—	MF	ENG	Emmanuel Sarpong
—	FW	ENG	Ekemini Umoren
—	DF	ENG	Coist Walker

=== Captaincy history ===
Below is a list of all the official club captains Hull City has had since the 1997-98 season. Temporary captains are not included in the list.

Name	Nation	Tenure	Ref.
Gregor Rioch	(England) ENG	July 1997 – July 1998	
David D'Auria	(Wales) WAL	July 1998 – November 1999	
Justin Whittle	(England) ENG	November 1999 – July 2003	
Ian Ashbee	(England) ENG	July 2003 – January 2011	
Andy Dawson	(England) ENG	January 2011 – July 2011	
Jack Hobbs	(England) ENG	August 2011 – July 2012	
Robert Koren	(Slovenia) SVN	July 2012 – May 2014	

Name	Nation	Tenure	Ref.
Curtis Davies	(England) ENG	July 2014 – July 2015	
Michael Dawson	(England) ENG	August 2015 – July 2018	
Markus Henriksen	(Norway) NOR	August 2018 – July 2019	
Eric Lichaj	(United States) USA	July 2019 – June 2020	
Jordy de Wijs	(Netherlands) NED	June 2020 – August 2020	
Richie Smallwood	(England) ENG	August 2020 – June 2022	
Lewie Coyle	(England) ENG	July 2022 – Present	

=== Player of the Year ===
Below is a list of all the recipients of Hull City's Player of the Year award since the 1974–75 season.

Name	Nation	Season	Ref.
Malcolm Lord	(England) ENG	1974–75	–
Dave Roberts	(Wales) WAL	1975–76	–
N/A (Note: There is no record of a Player of the Year award for the 1976–77 season)	–	1976–77	–
Gordon Nisbet	(England) ENG	1977–78	
Gordon Nisbet	(England) ENG	1978–79	
Keith Edwards	(England) ENG	1979–80	–
Garreth Roberts	(England) ENG	1980–81	
Les Mutrie	(England) ENG	1981–82	–
Peter Skipper	(England) ENG	1982–83	–
Garreth Roberts	(England) ENG	1983–84	
Billy Whitehurst	(England) ENG	1984–85	–
N/A (Note: There is no record of a Player of the Year award for the 1985–86 season)	–	1985–86	–
Richard Jobson	(England) ENG	1986–87	–
N/A (Note: There is no record of a Player of the Year award for the 1987–88 season)	–	1987–88	–
Wayne Jacobs	(England) ENG	1988–89	
Andy Payton	(England) ENG	1989–90	–
Andy Payton	(England) ENG	1990–91	–
Alan Fettis	(Northern Ireland) NIR	1991–92	

Name	Nation	Season	Ref.
Dave Norton	(England) ENG	1992–93	–
Dean Windass	(England) ENG	1993–94	–
Rob Dewhurst	(England) ENG	1994–95	–
Roy Carroll	(Northern Ireland) NIR	1995–96	
Duane Darby	(England) ENG	1996–97	–
Warren Joyce	(England) ENG	1997–98	–
Justin Whittle	(England) ENG	1998–99	
Mark Greaves	(England) ENG	1999–00	
Ian Goodison	(Jamaica) JAM	2000–01	
Gary Alexander	(England) ENG	2001–02	
Stuart Elliott	(Northern Ireland) NIR	2002–03	
Damien Delaney	(Republic of Ireland) IRL	2003–04	
Stuart Elliott	(Northern Ireland) NIR	2004–05	
Boaz Myhill	(Wales) WAL	2005–06	
Andy Dawson	(England) ENG	2006–07	
Michael Turner	(England) ENG	2007–08	
Michael Turner	(England) ENG	2008–09	
Stephen Hunt	(Republic of Ireland) IRL	2009–10	

Name	Nation	Season	Ref.
Anthony Gerrard	(Republic of Ireland) IRL	2010–11	
Robert Koren	(Slovenia) SVN	2011–12	
Ahmed Elmohamady	(Egypt) EGY	2012–13	
Curtis Davies	(England) ENG	2013–14	
Michael Dawson	(England) ENG	2014–15	
Abel Hernández	(Uruguay) URU	2015–16	
Sam Clucas	(England) ENG	2016–17	
Allan McGregor	(Scotland) SCO	2017–18	
Jarrod Bowen	(England) ENG	2018–19	
N/A (Note: Hull City did not host an awards ceremony nor give out a Player of the Year award for the 2019–20 season due to the COVID-19 pandemic)	–	2019–20	–
George Honeyman	(England) ENG	2020–21	
Keane Lewis-Potter	(England) ENG	2021–22	
Alfie Jones	(Canada) CAN	2022–23	
Jacob Greaves	(England) ENG	2023–24	
Ivor Pandur	(Croatia) CRO	2024–25	
Oli McBurnie	(Scotland) SCO	2025–26	

=== Hall of Fame ===
On 18 October 2017, Hull City announced the creation of its own Hall of Fame to honour the numerous legendary figures from throughout the club's history, with the first inductees to be decided in February 2018.

Name	Nation	Years	Inducted	Ref.
Ian Ashbee	(England) ENG	2002–2011	2018	
Nick Barmby	(England) ENG	2004–2012 (Note: Barmby played for Hull City between 2004–2012, but between 2011–2012 he also worked as the team's player-manager)	2023	
Billy Bly	(England) ENG	1938–1959	2018	
Raich Carter	(England) ENG	1948–1952 (Note: Carter played for Hull City between 1948–1952, but between 1948–1951 he also worked as the team's player-manager)	2024	
Chris Chilton	(England) ENG	1960–1971	2018	
Andy Davidson	(Scotland) SCO	1952–1968	2018	
Andy Dawson	(England) ENG	2003–2024 (Note: Dawson played for Hull City between 2003–2013, but returned in both 2022 and 2024 for separate spells as interim manager)	2022	

Name	Nation	Years	Inducted	Ref.
Stuart Elliott	(Northern Ireland) NIR	2002–2008	2024	
Ken Houghton	(England) ENG	1965–1979 (Note: Houghton played for Hull City between 1965–1973, and later managed them between 1978–1979)	2025	
Tony Norman	(Wales) WAL	1980–1988	2025	
Garreth Roberts	(England) ENG	1978–1991	2021	
Peter Skipper	(England) ENG	1979–1988 (Note: Skipper had two separate spells at Hull City, the first between 1979–1980 and the second between 1982–1988)	2019	
Ken Wagstaff	(England) ENG	1964–1976	2018	
Dean Windass	(England) ENG	1991–2009 (Note: Windass had three separate spells at Hull City, the first between 1991–1995, the second in 2007, and the third between 2007–2009)	2020	

=== Hull City Ladies F.C. ===
Hull City Ladies F.C. are not a registered affiliate of Hull City A.F.C. and their men's team, however, they do share a number of similarities, namely their club colours and crest. As of the 2024–25 season, they compete in the FA Women's National League North. The Tigresses, as they are known, play their home games at the Easy Buy Stadium in nearby Barton-upon-Humber, Lincolnshire.

== Management ==
=== Ownership and board members ===
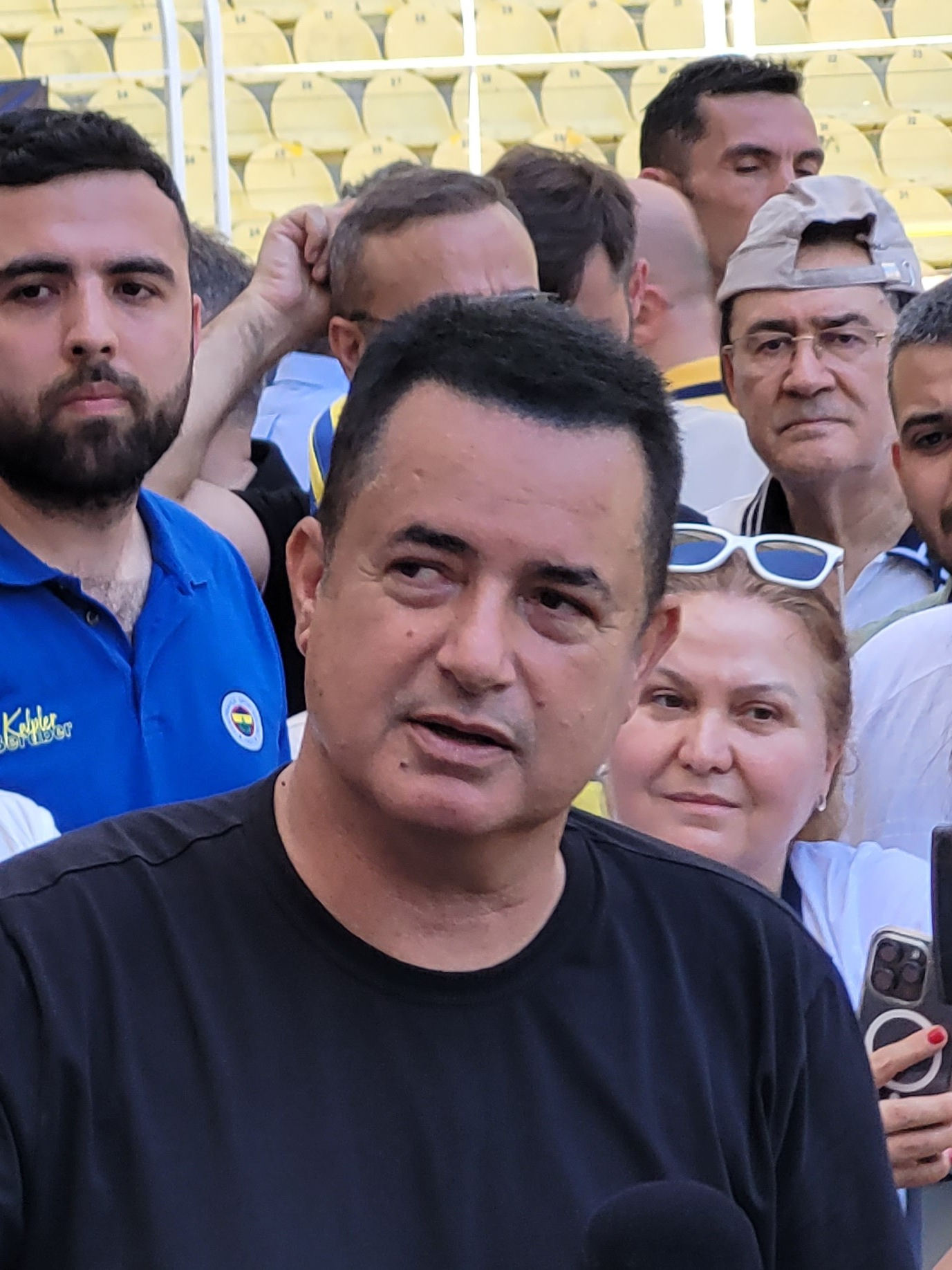
Acun Ilıcalı, owner of Hull City since 2022

As of 11 June 2025

Position	Name	Ref.
Owner	(Turkey) Acun Medya	
Chairman	(Turkey) Acun Ilıcalı	
Club adviser	(Turkey) Merthan Açıl	
Club adviser	(Turkey) Mustafa Yokes	
Head of Recruitment	(England) Martin Hodge	
Chief Scout	(England) Stuart White	

=== Coaches and non-playing staff ===
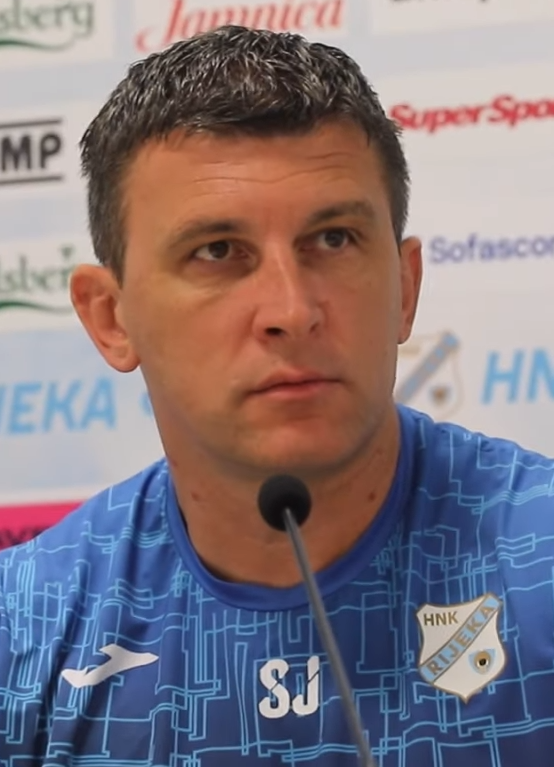
Sergej Jakirović, manager of Hull City since 2025

As of 2 July 2025

Position	Name	Ref.
Head Coach	(Bosnia and Herzegovina) Sergej Jakirović	
Assistant Head Coach	(England) Dean Holden	
Assistant Head Coach	(Croatia) Marko Salatović	
First Team Fitness Coach	(Croatia) Marin Ivančić	
First Team Goalkeeping Coach	(England) Erbil Bozkurt	
Head of Analysis	(Croatia) Anđelo Roguljić	
Head of Player Development	(England) Andy Dawson	
Kitman	(England) John Eyre	
Groundsman	(England) Aaron Tong	
Club Doctor	(England) Dr. Ronnie Banerjee	
Head of Medical Performance	(England) Andrew Balderston	
Head of Physical Performance	(England) Matt Busby	

=== Managerial history ===
As of match played 7 November 2026

Only professional, competitive matches are counted. Additionally, interim managers are not included in the list.

No.	Name	Nation	Tenure	G	W	D	L	Win %
1 (Note: Player-manager)	Ambrose Langley	(England) ENG	April 1905 – April 1913	318	143	67	108	44.96
2	Harry Chapman	(England) ENG	April 1913 – October 1914	45	20	10	15	44.44
3	Fred Stringer	(England) ENG	October 1914 – July 1916	43	22	6	15	51.16
4	David Menzies	(Scotland) SCO	July 1916 – July 1921	90	31	27	32	34.44
5	Percy Lewis	(England) ENG	July 1921 – January 1923	71	27	18	26	38.02
6	Bill McCracken	(Northern Ireland) NIR	February 1923 – May 1931	375	134	104	137	35.73
7	Haydn Green	(England) ENG	May 1931 – March 1934	123	61	24	38	49.59
8	Jack Hill	(England) ENG	April 1934 – January 1936	77	24	15	38	31.16
4 (Note: Second managerial spell)	David Menzies	(Scotland) SCO	March 1936 – October 1936	24	5	8	11	20.83
9	Ernest Blackburn	(England) ENG	January 1937 – February 1946	117	50	31	36	42.73
10	Frank Buckley	(England) ENG	May 1946 – April 1948	80	33	19	28	41.25
11	Raich Carter	(England) ENG	May 1948 – September 1951	157	74	41	42	47.13
12	Bob Jackson	(England) ENG	June 1952 – March 1955	123	42	26	55	34.14
13	Bob Brocklebank	(England) ENG	March 1955 – May 1961	302	113	71	118	37.41
14	Cliff Britton	(England) ENG	July 1961 – November 1969	406	170	101	135	41.87
15 (Note: Neill began as a player-manager, before becoming the club's full-time manager in 1973)	Terry Neill	(Northern Ireland) NIR	June 1970 – September 1974	174	61	55	58	35.05
16 (Note: Kaye began as a player-manager, before becoming the club's full-time manager in 1975)	John Kaye	(England) ENG	September 1974 – October 1977	126	40	40	46	31.74
17	Bobby Collins	(Scotland) SCO	October 1977 – February 1978	19	4	7	8	21.05
18	Ken Houghton	(England) ENG	April 1978 – December 1979	72	23	22	27	31.94
19	Mike Smith	(England) ENG	January 1980 – March 1982	117	30	37	50	25.64
20	Colin Appleton	(England) ENG	June 1982 – May 1984	91	47	29	15	51.64
21 (Note: Horton began as a player-manager, before becoming the club's full-time manager in 1986)	Brian Horton	(England) ENG	June 1984 – April 1988	195	77	58	60	39.48
22	Eddie Gray	(Scotland) SCO	June 1988 – May 1989	51	13	14	24	25.49
20	Colin Appleton	(England) ENG	May 1989 – October 1989	16	1	8	7	06.25
23	Stan Ternent	(England) ENG	November 1989 – January 1991	62	19	15	28	30.64
24	Terry Dolan	(England) ENG	January 1991 – July 1997	322	99	96	127	30.74
25	Mark Hateley	(England) ENG	July 1997 – November 1998	76	17	14	45	22.36
26	Warren Joyce	(England) ENG	November 1998 – April 2000	86	33	25	28	38.37
27	Brian Little	(England) ENG	April 2000 – February 2002	97	41	28	28	42.26
28	Jan Mølby	(Denmark) DEN	April 2002 – October 2002	17	2	8	7	11.76
29	Peter Taylor	(England) ENG	October 2002 – June 2006	184	77	50	57	41.84
30	Phil Parkinson	(England) ENG	June 2006 – December 2006	24	5	6	13	20.83
31	Phil Brown	(England) ENG	December 2006 – June 2010	157	52	40	65	33.12
32 (Note: Dowie acted as the club's "Temporary Football Management Consultant" whilst Phil Brown was placed on gardening leave)	Iain Dowie	(Northern Ireland) NIR	March 2010 – June 2010	9	1	3	5	11.11
33	Nigel Pearson	(England) ENG	June 2010 – November 2011	64	23	20	21	35.94
34	Nick Barmby	(England) ENG	November 2011 – May 2012	33	13	8	12	39.39
35	Steve Bruce	(England) ENG	June 2012 – July 2016	201	83	44	74	41.29
36	Mike Phelan	(England) ENG	July 2016 – January 2017	24	7	4	13	29.17
37	Marco Silva	(Portugal) POR	January 2017 – May 2017	22	8	3	11	36.36
38	Leonid Slutsky	(Russia) RUS	June 2017 – December 2017	21	4	7	10	19.05
39	Nigel Adkins	(England) ENG	December 2017 – June 2019	78	26	21	31	33.33
40	Grant McCann	(Northern Ireland) NIR	June 2019 – January 2022	136	53	30	53	38.97
41	Shota Arveladze	(Georgia (country)) GEO	January 2022 – September 2022	30	9	6	15	30.00
42	Liam Rosenior	(England) ENG	November 2022 – May 2024	78	27	28	23	34.62
43	Tim Walter	(Germany) GER	July 2024 – November 2024	18	3	6	9	16.67
44	Rubén Sellés	(Spain) ESP	December 2024 – May 2025	28	9	8	11	32.14
45	Sergej Jakirović	(Bosnia and Herzegovina) BIH	June 2025 – Present	64	25	19	20	39.06

== Records and statistics ==
As of 8 August 2024

=== Appearances ===
Andy Davidson holds the record for the most appearances for Hull City. He featured 520 times for the Tigers in the league, and 579 times in all competitions. Garreth Roberts is second on the all competitions appearances list with 487, just ahead of Chris Chilton on 477. In the league alone, Roberts stands at 414, one behind Chilton on 415, who comes third. Between him and Davidson is George Maddison, with 430 league appearances.

The youngest debutant the club has seen was Matt Edeson. At 16 years and 60 days old, he came off the bench against Fulham on 10 October 1992. (Note: Hull City's website incorrectly records Edeson's debut as being on 10 December 1992 with him aged 16 years and 63 days old, neither of which is true) Hull's oldest debutant is Andy Hessenthaler, who played against Chesterfield on 1 February 2005 at 39 years and 168 days old. However, Steve Harper was the oldest player to appear for the Tigers. On 24 May 2015, at 40 years and 60 days old, Harper was in goal for the 0–0 draw against Manchester United that saw Hull relegated from the Premier League.

Theodore Whitmore of Jamaica holds the record for the most international caps won whilst playing for Hull City. During his time in black and amber between 1999 and 2002, Whitmore amassed 28 caps for his nation.

=== Goals ===
Chris Chilton holds the record for the most goals for Hull City. He scored 222 goals in all competitions between 1960 and 1971, with 193 of those being league goals. Ken Wagstaff, Chilton's strike partner for much of that time, comes second on both lists, with 173 of his 197 goals in black and amber coming in the league. Sammy Stevens is third in the all competitions list with 116 goals, whereas Paddy Mills and his 101 goals ranks him third amongst the league goalscorers.

The club record for the most goals scored by a single player in a competitive fixture belongs to Duane Darby. Against Whitby Town in an FA Cup first round replay on 26 November 1996, Darby scored six times in an 8–4 goalfest at Boothferry Park. The club record for the most goals scored by a single player in a single season is the 42 goals Bill McNaughton scored in the 1932–33 season.

=== Scorelines ===
Hull City's biggest margin of victory in a competitive fixture was their 11–1 drubbing of Carlisle United at Anlaby Road on 14 January 1939. The Tigers' biggest competitive away win was their 8–2 thrashing of Stalybridge Celtic on 26 November 1932 in the first round of the FA Cup.

Hull have been beaten 8–0 twice in their history, which is their biggest ever losing margin in a competitive fixture. Firstly, they lost to Wolverhampton Wanderers on 4 November 1911. This humiliating defeat was then equalled over a century later when Wigan Athletic beat the Tigers on 14 July 2020.

=== Attendances ===
The record for the highest ever attended competitive fixture involving Hull City stands at 89,345 spectators. This was set on 17 May 2014 for the 2014 FA Cup final against Arsenal at Wembley Stadium, which ended with the Tigers being beaten 3–2 in extra-time.

Hull's highest ever home attendance for a competitive fixture was recorded on 26 February 1949, when a crowd of 55,019 attended an FA Cup sixth round tie against Manchester United at Boothferry Park. Since moving to the MKM Stadium, the record stands at 25,030 spectators. This was set on 9 May 2010, when the Tigers played out a 0–0 draw with Liverpool on the final day of the 2009–10 season.

=== Transfers ===
The largest transfer fee the club has ever paid for a player is the rumoured £22 million they paid Rayo Vallecano for Nobel Mendy in 2026. Conversely, the most they have ever received for a player is also £22 million, which is what West Ham United paid for Jarrod Bowen in 2020.

=== European record ===
Season	Competition	Round	Opponent	Home	Away	Agg.
2014–15	UEFA Europa League	3Q	(Slovakia) FK AS Trenčín	2–1	0–0	2–1
2014–15	UEFA Europa League	PO	(Belgium) KSC Lokeren	2–1	0–1	2–2

Notes

- 3Q: Third qualifying round
- PO: Play-off round

== Honours ==
League

- Championship (level 2)
  - Runners-up: 2012–13
  - Play-off winners: 2008, 2016, 2026
- Third Division North / Third Division / League One (level 3)
  - Champions: 1932–33, 1948–49, 1965–66, 2020–21
  - Runners-up: 1958–59, 2004–05
  - 3rd place promotion: 1984–85
- Fourth Division / Third Division (level 4)
  - Runners-up: 1982–83, 2003–04

Cup

- FA Cup
  - Runners-up: 2013–14
- Associate Members' Cup
  - Runners-up: 1983–84
- Watney Cup
  - Runners-up: 1973
