= 1986–87 Hull City A.F.C. season =

English football club season

Hull City
1986–87 season
- Chairman: Don Robinson
- Manager: Brian Horton
- Stadium: Boothferry Park
- Second Division: 14th
- FA Cup: Fifth round
- League Cup: Third round
- Full Members' Cup: Second round
- Top goalscorer: League: Andy Saville (9); All: Andy Saville (11)
Home colours	Away colours

The 1986–87 season was the 83rd season in the history of Hull City Association Football Club and their second consecutive season in the Second Division. In addition to the domestic league, the club would also participate in the FA Cup, the League Cup, and the Full Members' Cup.

== Competitions ==
=== Second Division ===
==== League table ====
Pos	Team	Pld	W	D	L	GF	GA	GD	Pts
12	Blackburn Rovers	42	15	10	17	45	55	−10	55
13	Reading	42	14	11	17	52	59	−7	53
14	Hull City	42	13	14	15	41	55	−14	53
15	West Bromwich Albion	42	13	12	17	51	49	+2	51
16	Millwall	42	14	9	19	39	45	−6	51

Rules for classification: 1) Points; 2) Goal difference; 3) Goals scored

==== Results summary ====
Overall								Home						Away					
Pld	W	D	L	GF	GA	GD	Pts	W	D	L	GF	GA	GD	W	D	L	GF	GA	GD
42	13	14	15	41	55	−14	53	10	6	5	25	22	+3	3	8	10	16	33	−17

Source: Soccerbase

==== Matches ====
Win Draw Loss

#	Date	Home	Result	Away	Venue	Att.	Scorers (Note: Hull scorers only)
1	23 August 1986	Hull City	2–0	West Bromwich Albion	H	8,658	Flounders, Roberts
2	26 August 1986	Millwall	0–1	Hull City	A	4,300	Bunn
3	30 August 1986	Oldham Athletic	0–0	Hull City	A	5,104	
4	2 September 1986	Hull City	0–2	Portsmouth	H	7,706	
5	6 September 1986	Hull City	0–3	Plymouth Argyle	H	6,451	
6	13 September 1986	Sunderland	1–0	Hull City	A	12,911	
7	20 September 1986	Hull City	3–2	Birmingham City	H	6,851	Roberts (2), Skipper
8	27 September 1986	Leeds United	3–0	Hull City	A	13,542	
9	4 October 1986	Hull City	2–1	Ipswich Town	H	6,872	Saville (2)
10	11 October 1986	Derby County	1–1	Hull City	A	12,353	(o.g.)
11	18 October 1986	Hull City	0–2	Reading	H	5,705	
12	25 October 1986	Huddersfield Town	1–3	Hull City	A	5,406	Saville, Skipper, Flounders
13	1 November 1986	Brighton & Hove Albion	2–1	Hull City	A	7,318	Jobson
14	8 November 1986	Hull City	0–4	Stoke City	H	5,252	
15	15 November 1986	Blackburn Rovers	0–2	Hull City	A	4,149	Corkain, Saville
16	22 November 1986	Hull City	2–1	Bradford City	H	6,423	Skipper, McEwan
17	29 November 1986	Shrewsbury Town	3–0	Hull City	A	2,869	
18	6 December 1986	Hull City	1–1	Grimsby Town	H	7,217	McEwan
19	13 December 1986	Crystal Palace	5–1	Hull City	A	4,839	Roberts
20	26 December 1986	Sheffield United	4–2	Hull City	A	11,296	Jobson, Flounders
21	27 December 1986	Hull City	0–0	Blackburn Rovers	H	5,789	
22	1 January 1987	Hull City	3–4	Barnsley	H	4,879	Bunn, Roberts, McEwan
23	3 January 1987	Plymouth Argyle	4–0	Hull City	A	12,064	
24	24 January 1987	West Bromwich Albion	1–1	Hull City	A	6,707	Jobson
25	7 February 1987	Hull City	1–0	Oldham Athletic	H	5,651	Saville
26	14 February 1987	Portsmouth	1–0	Hull City	A	11,098	
27	28 February 1987	Birmingham City	0–0	Hull City	A	6,858	
28	3 March 1987	Hull City	1–0	Sunderland	H	5,713	Saville
29	7 March 1987	Hull City	0–0	Huddersfield Town	H	5,872	
30	14 March 1987	Reading	1–0	Hull City	A	5,493	
31	21 March 1987	Hull City	1–1	Derby County	H	9,684	Saville
32	28 March 1987	Ipswich Town	0–0	Hull City	A	10,340	
33	4 April 1987	Stoke City	1–1	Hull City	A	8,146	Bunn
34	8 April 1987	Hull City	0–0	Leeds United	H	9,531	
35	14 April 1987	Hull City	2–1	Millwall	H	5,327	Bunn, Jobson
36	18 April 1987	Barnsley	1–1	Hull City	A	5,607	Skipper
37	20 April 1987	Hull City	0–0	Sheffield United	H	8,765	
38	25 April 1987	Bradford City	2–0	Hull City	A	10,390	
39	28 April 1987	Hull City	1–0	Brighton & Hove Albion	H	5,219	Jobson
40	2 May 1987	Hull City	3–0	Shrewsbury Town	H	5,114	Heard, Dyer (2)
41	5 May 1987	Grimsby Town	2–2	Hull City	A	6,757	Saville (2)
42	9 May 1987	Hull City	3–0	Crystal Palace	H	7,656	Dyer (2), Williams

=== FA Cup ===
==== Matches ====
Win Draw Loss

#	Date	Home	Result	Away	Venue	Att.	Scorers
3R	31 January 1987	Shrewsbury Town	1–2	Hull City	A	4,130	Saville, Bunn
4R	3 February 1987	Swansea City	0–1	Hull City	A	8,853	Jobson
5R	21 February 1987	Wigan Athletic	3–0	Hull City	A	11,453	

=== League Cup ===
==== Matches ====
Win Draw Loss

#	Date	Home	Result	Away	Venue	Att.	Scorers
2R	23 September 1986	Hull City	1–0	Grimsby Town	H	5,115	Saville
2R	7 October 1986	Grimsby Town	1–1	Hull City	A	6,192	McEwan
3R	28 October 1986	Shrewsbury Town	1–0	Hull City	A	3,077	

=== Full Members' Cup ===
==== Matches ====
Win Draw Loss

#	Date	Home	Result	Away	Venue	Att.	Scorers
1R	21 October 1986	Grimsby Town	1–3	Hull City	A	2,460	Flounders (2), Curran
2R	25 November 1986	Southampton	2–1	Hull City	A	4,158	Parker

== Squad ==
Name	Position	Nationality	Place of birth	Date of birth (age) (Note: Players' ages listed as they were on 1 July 1986, the official start date of the 1986–87 season)	Previous club	Date signed	Fee
Goalkeepers
John Davies	GK	WAL	Llandysul	18 November 1959 (age 26)	(Wales) Cardiff City	June 1980	£12,000
Gavin Kelly	GK	ENG	Beverley	29 September 1968 (age 17)	Academy	March 1984	–
Tony Norman	GK	WAL	Mancot	24 February 1958 (age 28)	Burnley	February 1980	Unknown
Defenders
Gary Ablett	DF	ENG	Aigburth	19 November 1965 (age 20)	Liverpool	September 1986	Loan
Steve Brentano	DF	ENG	Hull	9 November 1961 (age 24)	North Ferriby United	March 1982	Unknown
Nicky Brown	DF	ENG	Hull	16 October 1966 (age 19)	Academy	September 1985	–
Neil Buckley	DF	ENG	Hull	25 September 1968 (age 17)	Academy	July 1985	–
Pat Heard	DF	ENG	Hull	17 March 1960 (age 26)	Middlesbrough	March 1986	Unknown
Richard Jobson	DF	ENG	Cottingham	9 May 1963 (age 23)	Watford	February 1985	£40,000
Stan McEwan	DF	SCO	Newmains	8 June 1957 (age 29)	Exeter City	March 1984	Unknown
Charlie Palmer	DF	ENG	Aylesbury	10 July 1963 (age 22)	Derby County	February 1987	£30,000
Lawrie Pearson	DF	ENG	Wallsend	2 July 1965 (age 20)	Gateshead	July 1984	Unknown
Peter Skipper	DF	ENG	Hull	11 April 1958 (age 28)	Darlington	August 1982	Unknown
Gary Swann	DF	ENG	York	11 April 1962 (age 24)	Academy	July 1980	–
Les Thompson	DF	ENG	Cleethorpes	23 September 1968 (age 17)	Grimsby Town	May 1987	Free
Midfielders
Billy Askew	MF	ENG	Great Lumley	2 October 1959 (age 26)	Middlesbrough	August 1982	Free
Steve Corkain	MF	ENG	Stockton-on-Tees	25 February 1967 (age 19)	Academy	July 1985	–
Ray Daniel	MF	ENG	Luton	10 December 1964 (age 21)	Luton Town	June 1986	Unknown
Bobby Doyle	MF	SCO	Dumbarton	27 December 1953 (age 32)	Portsmouth	August 1985	Unknown
Brian Horton	MF	ENG	Hednesford	4 February 1949 (age 37)	Luton Town	June 1984	Unknown
Leigh Jenkinson	MF	ENG	Thorne	9 July 1969 (age 16)	Academy	July 1986	–
Paul Olsson	MF	ENG	Hull	24 December 1965 (age 20)	Academy	January 1984	–
Garry Parker	MF	ENG	Oxford	7 September 1965 (age 20)	Luton Town	February 1986	£70,000
Garreth Roberts	MF	ENG	Hull	15 November 1960 (age 25)	Academy	March 1979	–
Neil Williams	MF	ENG	Waltham Abbey	23 October 1964 (age 21)	Watford	July 1984	Free
Forwards
Frankie Bunn	FW	ENG	Birmingham	6 November 1962 (age 23)	Luton Town	July 1985	Unknown
Terry Curran	FW	ENG	Kinsley	20 March 1955 (age 31)	(Greece) Panionios	October 1986	Unknown
Alex Dyer	FW	ENG	Forest Gate	14 November 1965 (age 20)	Blackpool	February 1987	Unknown
Andy Flounders	FW	ENG	Hull	13 December 1963 (age 22)	Academy	October 1980	–
Andy Payton	FW	ENG	Whalley	23 October 1967 (age 18)	Burnley	July 1985	Free
Andy Saville	FW	ENG	Hull	12 December 1964 (age 21)	Academy	December 1983	–
Mike Smith	FW	ENG	Hull	19 December 1968 (age 17)	Academy	May 1987	–
