= List of Hull City A.F.C. seasons =

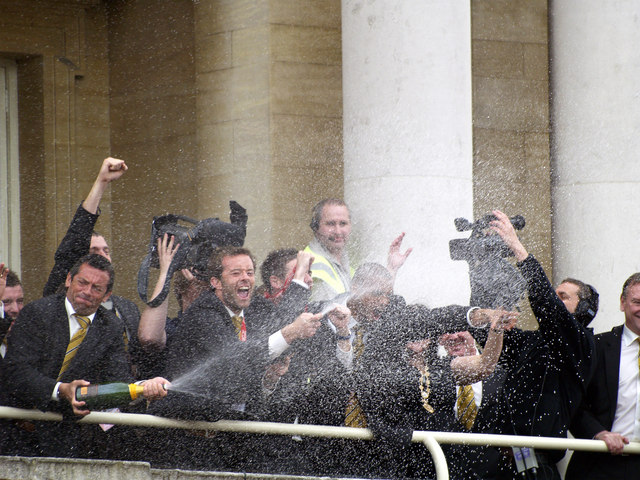
Hull City players and staff celebrate promotion to the Premier League for the first time in their history, which was achieved after victory in the 2008 Football League Championship play-off final.

Hull City Association Football Club, an English association football club based in Kingston upon Hull, East Riding of Yorkshire, was founded in 1904. The team's first competitive matches came in the FA Cup, being beaten 4–1 by Stockton in a replay following a 3–3 draw, before they were elected to the Football League Second Division ahead of the 1905–06 season. Hull missed out on promotion in the 1909–10 season, having an inferior goal average to Oldham Athletic and finishing in third. The 1929–30 season saw Hull relegated to the Third Division North after 21 seasons in the Second Division while reaching the semi-final of the FA Cup, where they were beaten by Arsenal after a replay. Promotion back to the Second Division was achieved three years later, with the Third Division North championship becoming the club's first major honour. However, they were relegated in the 1935–36 season and it was 13 years before another return to the Second Division was made, when, under the player-management of former England international Raich Carter, the Third Division North title was won. Relegation back to this division came in the 1955–56 season and following League reorganisation implemented for the 1958–59 season Hull won promotion in the Third Division's inaugural season, although they were relegated after one year.

The Third Division championship was won in the 1965–66 season and Hull remained in the Second Division for 12 years before relegation in 1978. Hull reached the semi-final of the Watney Cup in the tournament's inaugural staging in 1970, where they were beaten by Manchester United in a penalty shoot-out; this was the first game in English football to be decided by this method. The Final of this competition was reached in 1974, where Hull were beaten by Stoke City. Relegation to the Fourth Division for the first time in the club's history came in 1981 and a return to the Third Division was secured two years later in the 1982–83 season. The season after, Hull reached the final of the Associate Members' Cup in its inaugural season and were beaten by AFC Bournemouth. Promotion to the Second Division came the following season, although relegations in the 1990–91 and 1995–96 seasons saw the club return to the fourth tier.

Hull City Performances from 1905 until 2023

Hull's first play-off campaign ended unsuccessfully, being beaten by Leyton Orient in the semi-final in the 2000–01 season. However, successive promotions in the 2003–04 and 2004–05 seasons saw Hull rise from the fourth tier to the second tier in a space of two years. After 104 years of existence, Hull were promoted to the Premier League for the first time in their history, beating Watford in the play-off semi-finals and Bristol City in the 2008 Football League Championship play-off final. Hull's first Premier League season saw safety from relegation ensured on the last day of the season, although the club was relegated the following season after finishing 19th in the league. Three years later, Hull returned to the Premier League after finishing the 2012–13 season as Championship runners-up. In the 2013–14 season they achieved their highest ever league finish of 16th and were runners-up to Arsenal in their first ever FA Cup Final appearance. Since then, they have been relegated to the Championship and promoted again.

Since their election to the Football League in 1905, Hull have spent 5 seasons in the first tier, 64 in the second, 30 (plus the abandoned 1939–40 season) in the third, and 10 in the fourth (current to the end of the 2024–25 season). The table below details Hull City's achievements in senior first team competition from the 1904–05 season to the end of the most recently completed season.

== Key ==
1st	2nd	↑	↓
Champions	Runners-up	Promoted	Relegated

Top scorer shown alongside # when he was also top scorer in that division.
Division shown alongside † when it changes due to promotion, relegation or reorganisation.
League results shown in italics for competitions abandoned due to war.

Key to league record:

- Pld – Matches played
- W – Matches won
- D – Matches drawn
- L – Matches lost
- GF – Goals for
- GA – Goals against
- Pts – Points
- Pos – Final position
- ↑ – Promoted
- ↓ – Relegated

Key to divisions:

- Champ – EFL Championship
- Div 2 – Football League Second Division
- Div 3 – Football League Third Division
- Div 3N – Football League Third Division North
- Div 4 – Football League Fourth Division
- Lge 1 – EFL League One
- Prem – Premier League

Key to rounds:

- Grp – Group stage
- GrpN – Group stage Northern section
- PR – Preliminary round
- R1 – Round 1, etc.
- R1N – Round 1 Northern section, etc.
- QFN – Quarter-final Northern section
- SF – Semi-final
- SFN – Semi-final Northern section
- FN – Final Northern section
- RU – Runners-up
- DNE – Did not enter

== Seasons ==
Season	League									FA Cup	League Cup	Other competitions		Top scorer(s) (Note: Includes goals scored in the Football League (including play-offs), Premier League, FA Cup, Football League Third Division North Cup, EFL Cup, Watney Cup, Anglo-Italian Cup, Anglo-Scottish Cup, Football League Group Cup/Football League Trophy, Associate Members' Cup/Football League Trophy and Full Members' Cup. Sources: 1904–05 to 1998–99, 1999–2000 onwards.)	
Season	Division	Pld	W	D	L	GF	GA	Pts	Pos	FA Cup	League Cup	Other competitions		Top scorer(s)	
1904–05	Hull City did not play league football until 1905–06.									PR				George Spence	2
1905–06	Div 2 † (Note: Hull were elected to the Football League Second Division for the 1905–06 season.)	38	19	6	13	67	54	44	5th	R1				Joe Smith	16
1906–07	Div 2	38	15	7	16	65	57	37	9th	R1				Jackie Smith	19
1907–08	Div 2	38	21	4	13	73	62	46	8th	R2				Jackie Smith # (Note: 31 goals in the Second Division.)	32
1908–09	Div 2	38	19	6	13	63	39	44	4th	R1				Arthur Temple	18
1909–10	Div 2	38	23	7	8	80	46	53	3rd (Note: Hull missed out on promotion to the First Division due to having an inferior goal average to Oldham Athletic.)	R1				Jackie Smith # (Note: 32 goals in the Second Division.)	32
1910–11	Div 2	38	14	16	8	55	39	44	5th	R3				Tommy Browell	16
1911–12	Div 2	38	17	8	13	54	51	42	7th	R1				Tommy Browell; Arthur Temple	16
1912–13	Div 2	38	15	6	17	60	56	36	12th	R2				Stan Fazackerley	20
1913–14	Div 2	38	16	9	13	53	37	41	7th	R1				Sammy Stevens	26
1914–15	Div 2	38	19	5	14	65	54	43	7th	R4				Sammy Stevens	30
The Football League and FA Cup were suspended until after the First World War.
1919–20	Div 2	42	18	6	18	78	72	42	11th	R1				Sammy Stevens	20
1920–21	Div 2	42	10	20	12	43	53	40	13th	R4				Harry Sergeaunt	9
1921–22	Div 2	42	19	10	13	51	41	48	5th	R2				Charlie Flood	17
1922–23	Div 2	42	14	14	14	43	45	42	12th	R1				George Martin	12
1923–24	Div 2	42	10	17	15	46	51	37	17th	R1				Paddy Mills	12
1924–25	Div 2	42	15	11	16	50	49	41	10th	R3				Paddy Mills	29
1925–26	Div 2	42	16	9	17	63	61	41	13th	R3				Paddy Mills	17
1926–27	Div 2	42	20	7	15	63	52	47	7th	R5				George Whitworth	17
1927–28	Div 2	42	12	15	15	41	54	38	14th	R3				George Martin; Arthur Nelson	8
1928–29	Div 2	42	13	14	15	58	63	40	12th	R3				Ken McDonald	25
1929–30	Div 2	42	14	7	21	51	78	35	21st ↓	SF				Stan Alexander	19
1930–31	Div 3N †	42	20	10	12	99	55	50	6th	R3				Stan Alexander	24
1931–32	Div 3N	40	20	5	15	82	53	45	8th	R3				Dally Duncan; Russell Wainscoat	19
1932–33	Div 3N	42	26	7	9	100	45	59	1st ↑	R3				Bill McNaughton # (Note: 41 goals in the Third Division North.)	42
1933–34	Div 2 †	42	13	12	17	52	68	38	15th	R4				Bill McNaughton	16
1934–35	Div 2	42	16	8	18	63	74	40	13th	R3				Andy Duncan	12
1935–36	Div 2	42	5	10	27	47	111	20	22nd ↓	R3				Jack Acquroff	13
1936–37	Div 3N †	42	17	12	13	68	69	46	5th	R1		Football League Third Division North Cup	R1	Cliff Hubbard	17
1937–38	Div 3N	42	20	13	9	80	43	53	3rd	R3		Football League Third Division North Cup	R1	Jack Fryer; John McNeill	25
1938–39	Div 3N	42	18	10	14	83	74	46	7th (Note: Beat Carlisle United 11–1 at home to set a record league victory.)	R2		Football League Third Division North Cup	R2	Arthur Cunliffe; Cliff Hubbard	21
1939–40	Div 3N	2	0	2	0	3	3	2	13th (Note: The 1939–40 season was abandoned with two matches played when the Second World War began. Hull City do not include appearances and goals from those two matches in players' career records.)					Richard Lowe	2
The Football League and FA Cup were suspended until after the Second World War.
1945–46										DNE (Note: Although the Football League did not resume until the 1946–47 season, the FA Cup was contested in 1945–46. From the First Round Proper to the Sixth Round (quarter-final), results were determined on aggregate score over two legs. However, Hull did not participate in the competition this season as the club did not have a ground available until Boothferry Park was built in 1946.)					
1946–47	Div 3N	42	16	8	18	49	53	40	11th	R3				Benny Lester	17
1947–48	Div 3N	42	18	11	13	59	48	47	5th	R3				Norman Moore	13
1948–49	Div 3N	42	27	11	4	93	28	65	1st ↑	R6 (Note: Set an all time record attendance of 55,019 against Manchester United in the FA Cup.)				Norman Moore	28
1949–50	Div 2 †	42	17	11	14	64	72	45	7th	R4				Raich Carter	16
1950–51	Div 2	42	16	11	15	74	70	43	10th	R5				Alf Ackerman; Raich Carter	21
1951–52	Div 2	42	13	11	18	60	70	37	18th	R4				Syd Gerrie	25
1952–53	Div 2	42	14	8	20	57	69	36	18th	R4				Syd Gerrie	14
1953–54	Div 2	42	16	6	20	64	66	38	15th	R5				Alf Ackerman	19
1954–55	Div 2	42	12	10	20	44	69	34	19th	R3				Alf Ackerman; Bob Crosbie	11
1955–56	Div 2	42	10	6	26	53	97	26	22nd ↓	R3				Bill Bradbury	9
1956–57	Div 3N †	46	21	10	15	84	69	52	8th	R3				Doug Clarke	20
1957–58	Div 3N	46	19	15	12	78	67	53	5th	R4				Bill Bradbury	25
1958–59	Div 3 † (Note: Hull were placed in the Football League Third Division on League reorganisation.)	46	26	9	11	90	55	61	2nd ↑	R1				Bill Bradbury	30
1959–60	Div 2 †	42	10	10	22	48	76	30	21st ↓	R3				Roy Shiner	8
1960–61	Div 3 †	46	17	12	17	73	73	46	11th	R3	R1 (Note: The League Cup competition started in the 1960–61 season.)			Chris Chilton	20
1961–62	Div 3	46	20	8	18	67	54	48	10th	R2	R3			John McSeveney	16
1962–63	Div 3	46	19	10	17	74	69	48	10th	R3	R3			John McSeveney	27
1963–64	Div 3	46	16	17	13	73	68	49	8th	R3	R3			Chris Chilton	24
1964–65	Div 3	46	23	12	11	91	57	58	4th	R2	R2			Chris Chilton (Note: Ken Wagstaff, who joined Hull from Mansfield Town during the 1964–65 season, was the Third Division top scorer with 32 goals; nine were scored for Mansfield and 23 were scored for Hull.)	27
1965–66	Div 3	46	31	7	8	109	62	69	1st ↑	R6	R2			Ken Wagstaff	31
1966–67	Div 2 †	42	16	7	19	77	72	39	12th	R3	R1			Ken Wagstaff	21
1967–68	Div 2	42	12	13	17	58	73	37	17th	R3	R2			Ken Wagstaff	20
1968–69	Div 2	42	13	16	13	59	52	42	11th	R3	R2			Ken Wagstaff	21
1969–70	Div 2	42	15	11	16	72	70	41	13th	R3	R3			Chris Chilton; Ken Wagstaff	19
1970–71	Div 2	42	19	13	10	54	41	51	5th	R6	R2	Watney Cup	SF (Note: Hull's Watney Cup semi-final with Manchester United was the first game in English football to be decided by a penalty shoot-out, which was lost 4–3 after the game finished 1–1 after extra time.)	Chris Chilton	26
1971–72	Div 2	42	14	10	18	49	53	38	12th	R5	R2			Stuart Pearson	15
1972–73	Div 2	42	14	12	16	64	59	40	13th	R5	R3	Anglo-Italian Cup	Grp	Stuart Pearson	17
1973–74	Div 2	42	13	17	12	46	47	43	9th	R3	R4	Watney Cup	RU (Note: Lost 2–0 to Stoke City.)	Roy Greenwood; Stuart Pearson	12
1974–75	Div 2	42	15	14	13	40	53	44	8th	R3	R2			Ken Wagstaff	11
1975–76	Div 2	42	14	11	17	45	49	39	14th	R4	R4	Anglo-Scottish Cup	Grp	Alf Wood	10
1976–77	Div 2	42	10	17	15	45	53	37	14th	R3	R2	Anglo-Scottish Cup	Grp	Jeff Hemmerman	7
1977–78	Div 2	42	8	12	22	34	52	28	22nd ↓	R3	R4	Anglo-Scottish Cup	Grp	Bruce Bannister; Alan Warboys	7
1978–79	Div 3 †	46	19	11	16	66	61	49	8th	R2	R1			Keith Edwards	25
1979–80	Div 3	46	12	16	18	51	69	40	20th	R1	R1			Keith Edwards	20
1980–81	Div 3	46	8	16	22	40	71	32	24th ↓	R4	R1	Anglo-Scottish Cup	Grp	Keith Edwards	17
1981–82	Div 4 †	46	19	12	15	70	61	69 (Note: The 1981–82 season saw the introduction of three points for a win instead of two.)	8th	R3	R1	Football League Group Cup	Grp (Note: Competed in the Football League Group Cup, a successor to the Anglo-Scottish Cup, failing to progress past the group stage in its two seasons. The competition was renamed the Football League Trophy for its second season, but is often referred to as the Football League Group Trophy to distinguish from the more recent Football League Trophy, of which it was a forerunner.)	Les Mutrie (Note: Keith Edwards, who left Hull for Sheffield United during the 1981–82 season, was the Fourth Division top scorer with 36 goals; one was scored for Hull and 35 were scored for United.)	28
1982–83	Div 4	46	25	15	6	75	34	90	2nd ↑	R1	R1	Football League Trophy	Grp	Brian Marwood	20
1983–84	Div 3 †	46	23	14	9	71	38	83	4th (Note: Hull missed out on promotion to the Second Division due to having scored less goals than Sheffield United.)	R2	R1	Associate Members' Cup	RU (Note: Lost 2–1 to AFC Bournemouth.)	Brian Marwood	16
1984–85	Div 3	46	25	12	9	78	49	87	3rd ↑	R3	R2	Associate Members' Cup	R1N	Billy Whitehurst	24
1985–86	Div 2 †	42	17	13	12	65	55	64	6th	R4	R2	Full Members' Cup	FN	Frankie Bunn	20
1986–87	Div 2	42	13	14	15	41	55	53	14th	R5	R3	Full Members' Cup	R2	Andy Saville	11
1987–88	Div 2	44	14	15	15	54	60	57	15th	R3	R2	Full Members' Cup	R1	Alex Dyer	9
1988–89	Div 2	46	11	14	21	52	68	47	21st	R5	R2	Full Members' Cup	R1	Keith Edwards # (Note: 26 goals in the Second Division.)	30
1989–90	Div 2	46	14	16	16	58	68	58	14th	R3	R1	Full Members' Cup	R2	Andy Payton	18
1990–91	Div 2	46	10	15	21	57	85	45	24th ↓	R3	R3	Full Members' Cup	R1	Andy Payton	25
1991–92	Div 3 †	46	16	11	19	54	54	59	14th	R3	R2	Associate Members' Cup	QFN	Leigh Jenkinson	9
1992–93	Div 2 † (Note: When the newly formed FA Premier League split from the Football League, the remaining divisions of the Football League were renumbered upwards.)	46	13	11	22	46	69	50	20th	R2	R1	Football League Trophy	R2N	Graeme Atkinson	8
1993–94	Div 2	46	18	14	14	62	54	68	9th	R2	R1	Football League Trophy	GrpN	Dean Windass	24
1994–95	Div 2	46	21	11	14	70	57	74	8th	R1	R1	Football League Trophy	GrpN	Dean Windass	17
1995–96	Div 2	46	5	16	25	36	78	31	24th ↓	R1	R2	Football League Trophy	R2N	Dean Windass	8
1996–97	Div 3 †	46	13	18	15	44	50	57	17th	R2	R1	Football League Trophy	R2N	Duane Darby	20
1997–98	Div 3	46	11	8	27	56	83	41	22nd	R1	R3	Football League Trophy	R2N	Duane Darby	15
1998–99	Div 3	46	14	11	21	44	62	53	21st	R3	R2	Football League Trophy	R2N	David Brown	14
1999–00	Div 3	46	15	14	17	43	43	59	14th	R3	R2	Football League Trophy	QFN	John Eyre	12
2000–01	Div 3	46	19	17	10	47	39	74	6th (Note: Lost 2–1 to Leyton Orient on aggregate in the play-off semi-finals.)	R1	R1	Football League Trophy	R1N	John Eyre	7
2001–02	Div 3	46	16	13	17	57	51	61	11th	R2	R2	Football League Trophy	SFN	Gary Alexander	23
2002–03	Div 3	46	14	17	15	58	53	59	13th	R1	R1	Football League Trophy	R1N	Stuart Elliott	12
2003–04	Div 3	46	25	13	8	82	44	88	2nd ↑	R1	R1	Football League Trophy	R2N	Ben Burgess	18
2004–05	Lge 1 † (Note: The Second Division was renamed League One as part of a rebranding exercise by the Football League.)	46	26	8	12	80	53	86	2nd ↑	R3	R1	Football League Trophy	R1N	Stuart Elliott # (Note: 27 goals in League One.)	29
2005–06	Champ †	46	12	16	18	49	55	52	18th	R3	R1			Stuart Elliott	7
2006–07	Champ	46	13	10	23	51	67	49	21st	R3	R3			Dean Windass	8
2007–08	Champ	46	21	12	13	65	47	75	3rd (Note: Promoted to the Premier League via the play-offs, beating Watford 6–1 on aggregate in the semi-final and Bristol City 1–0 in the 2008 Football League Championship play-off final.) ↑	R3	R3			Fraizer Campbell; Dean Windass	15
2008–09	Prem †	38	8	11	19	39	64	35	17th	R6	R2			Geovanni	8
2009–10	Prem	38	6	12	20	34	75	30	19th ↓	R3	R3			Stephen Hunt	6
2010–11	Champ †	46	16	17	13	52	50	65	11th	R3	R2			Matty Fryatt	9
2011–12	Champ	46	19	11	16	47	44	68	8th	R4	R1			Matty Fryatt	16
2012–13	Champ	46	24	7	15	61	52	79	2nd ↑	R4	R2			Robert Koren	9
2013–14	Prem †	38	10	7	21	38	53	37	16th (Note: Club's best finishing position in the league.)	RU (Note: Club's best performance in the FA Cup, reaching the final.)	R4			Matty Fryatt	6
2014–15	Prem	38	8	11	19	33	51	35	18th ↓	R3	R3	Europa League	PO	Nikica Jelavić	8
2015–16	Champ †	46	24	11	11	69	35	83	4th (Note: Promoted to the Premier League via the play-offs, beating Derby County 3–2 on aggregate in the semi-final and Sheffield Wednesday 1–0 in the 2016 Football League Championship play-off final.) ↑	R5	R5			Abel Hernández	22
2016–17	Prem †	38	9	7	22	37	80	34	18th ↓	R4	SF			Robert Snodgrass	9
2017–18	Champ †	46	11	16	19	70	70	49	18th	R5	R2			Jarrod Bowen	15
2018–19	Champ	46	17	11	18	66	68	62	13th	R3	R2			Jarrod Bowen	22
2019–20	Champ	46	12	9	25	57	87	45	24th ↓	R4	R2			Jarrod Bowen	17
2020–21	Lge 1 †	46	27	8	11	80	38	89	1st ↑	R2	R3	EFL Trophy	QF	Mallik Wilks	22
2021–22	Champ †	46	14	9	23	41	54	51	19th	R3	R1			Keane Lewis-Potter	13
2022–23	Champ	46	14	16	16	51	61	58	15th	R3	R1			Óscar Estupiñán	13
2023–24	Champ	46	19	13	14	68	60	70	7th	R3	R1			Jaden Philogene	12
2024–25	Champ	46	12	13	21	44	54	49	21st	R3	R1			João Pedro	6
2025–26	Champ †	46	21	10	15	70	66	73	6th (Note: Promoted to the Premier League via the play-offs, beating Millwall 2–0 on aggregate in the semi-final and Middlesbrough 1–0 in the 2026 EFL Championship play-off final.) ↑	R4	R1			Oli McBurnie	19
2026–27	Prem	–	–	–	–	–	–	–	–	–	–			–	–
