= 1988–89 Hull City A.F.C. season =

English football club season

Hull City
1988–89 season
- Chairman: Don Robinson
- Manager: Eddie Gray
- Stadium: Boothferry Park
- Second Division: 21st
- FA Cup: Fifth round
- League Cup: Second round
- Full Members' Cup: First round
- Top goalscorer: League: Keith Edwards (26); All: Keith Edwards (30)
Home colours	Away colours

The 1988–89 season was the 85th season in the history of Hull City Association Football Club and their fourth consecutive season in the Second Division. In addition to the domestic league, the club would also participate in the FA Cup, the League Cup, and the Full Members' Cup.

== Competitions ==
=== Second Division ===
==== League table ====
Pos	Team	Pld	W	D	L	GF	GA	GD	Pts	Qualification or relegation
19	Brighton & Hove Albion	46	14	9	23	57	66	−9	51	
20	Portsmouth	46	13	12	21	53	62	−9	51	
21	Hull City	46	11	14	21	52	68	−16	47	
22	Shrewsbury Town (R)	46	8	18	20	40	67	−27	42	Relegation to the Third Division
23	Birmingham City (R)	46	8	11	27	31	76	−45	35	Relegation to the Third Division

Source: thestatcat.co.uk
Rules for classification: 1) Points; 2) Goal difference; 3) Goals scored
(R) Relegated

==== Results summary ====
Overall								Home						Away					
Pld	W	D	L	GF	GA	GD	Pts	W	D	L	GF	GA	GD	W	D	L	GF	GA	GD
46	11	14	21	52	68	−16	47	7	9	7	31	25	+6	4	5	14	21	43	−22

Source: Soccerbase

==== Matches ====
Win Draw Loss

#	Date	Home	Result	Away	Venue	Att.	Scorers (Note: Hull scorers only)
1	27.08.88	Hull City	1–0	Manchester City	H	11,653	Edwards
2	29.08.88	Oxford United	1–0	Hull City	A	5,772	
3	03.09.88	Plymouth Argyle	2–0	Hull City	A	8,202	
4	10.09.88	Hull City	0–0	Barnsley	H	5,654	
5	17.09.88	Portsmouth	1–3	Hull City	A	11,599	Edwards (2), Dyer
6	20.09.88	Hull City	1–3	Blackburn Rovers	H	6,681	Edwards
7	24.09.88	Oldham Athletic	2–2	Hull City	A	6,319	(o.g.), Terry
8	01.10.88	Hull City	0–0	Walsall	H	4,845	
9	04.10.88	Hull City	2–2	Leicester City	H	5,079	Edwards, DeMange
10	08.10.88	Shrewsbury Town	1–3	Hull City	A	3,287	Edwards (2), Roberts
11	15.10.88	Hull City	0–0	Sunderland	H	8,261	
12	22.10.88	Crystal Palace	3–1	Hull City	A	8,464	Dyer
13	25.10.88	Hull City	3–0	Chelsea	H	6,953	Edwards (2), Smith
14	29.10.88	Leeds United	2–1	Hull City	A	17,536	Palmer
15	05.11.88	Hull City	1–0	Swindon Town	H	5,192	Moore
16	13.11.88	Stoke City	4–0	Hull City	A	10,505	
17	19.11.88	Hull City	1–1	Birmingham City	H	5,134	Edwards
18	26.11.88	Watford	2–0	Hull City	A	10,404	
19	29.11.88	Bournemouth	5–1	Hull City	A	5,420	Payton
20	03.12.88	Hull City	5–2	Brighton & Hove Albion	H	5,686	Payton (2), Saville, (o.g.), Daniel
21	10.12.88	West Bromwich Albion	2–0	Hull City	A	10,094	
22	26.12.88	Hull City	1–1	Bradford City	H	8,791	Payton
23	31.12.88	Hull City	1–1	Ipswich Town	H	7,800	Whitehurst
24	02.01.89	Barnsley	0–2	Hull City	A	9,879	Edwards (2)
25	14.01.89	Hull City	4–0	Bournemouth	H	5,690	Edwards (3), Whitehurst
26	21.01.89	Manchester City	4–1	Hull City	A	20,485	Edwards
27	04.02.89	Leicester City	0–2	Hull City	A	9,996	Edwards (2)
28	11.02.89	Hull City	3–0	Shrewsbury Town	H	11,472	Edwards (2), Whitehurst
29	25.02.89	Sunderland	2–0	Hull City	A	14,719	
30	28.02.89	Chelsea	2–1	Hull City	A	11,407	Roberts
31	04.03.89	Hull City	1–4	Stoke City	H	5,915	Whitehurst
32	11.03.89	Swindon Town	1–0	Hull City	A	7,090	
33	14.03.89	Hull City	1–2	Leeds United	H	8,887	Payton
34	18.03.89	Blackburn Rovers	4–0	Hull City	A	5,864	
35	25.03.89	Hull City	3–0	Plymouth Argyle	H	5,851	Edwards (2), Jobson
36	27.03.89	Bradford City	1–1	Hull City	A	11,802	Edwards
37	01.04.89	Hull City	1–1	Portsmouth	H	5,325	Edwards
38	04.04.89	Hull City	1–2	Oxford United	H	6,260	Swan
39	08.04.89	Ipswich Town	1–1	Hull City	A	10,191	Whitehurst
40	11.04.89	Hull City	0–1	Crystal Palace	H	5,050	
41	15.04.89	Walsall	1–1	Hull City	A	3,935	Edwards
42	22.04.89	Hull City	1–1	Oldham Athletic	H	6,748	McParland
43	29.04.89	Hull City	0–3	Watford	H	5,225	
44	01.05.89	Brighton & Hove Albion	1–1	Hull City	A	6,750	Edwards
45	06.05.89	Birmingham City	1–0	Hull City	A	4,686	
46	13.05.89	Hull City	0–1	West Bromwich Albion	H	5,217	

=== FA Cup ===
==== Matches ====
Win Draw Loss

#	Date	Home	Result	Away	Venue	Att.	Scorers
3R	07.01.89	Cardiff City	1–2	Hull City	A	7,128	Brown, Edwards
4R	28.01.89	Bradford City	1–2	Hull City	A	13,748	Whitehurst, Edwards
5R	18.02.89	Hull City	2–3	Liverpool	H	20,058	Whitehurst, Edwards

=== League Cup ===
==== Matches ====
Win Draw Loss

#	Date	Home	Result	Away	Venue	Att.	Scorers
2R	28.09.88	Hull City	1–2	Arsenal	H	11,450	Edwards
2R	12.10.88	Arsenal	3–0	Hull City	A	17,885	

=== Full Members' Cup ===
==== Matches ====
Win Draw Loss

#	Date	Home	Result	Away	Venue	Att.	Scorers
1R	08.11.88	Portsmouth	2–1	Hull City	A	2,784	Warren

== Squad ==
Name	Position	Nationality	Place of birth	Date of birth (age) (Note: Players' ages listed as they were on 1 July 1988, the official start date of the 1988–89 season)	Previous club	Date signed	Fee
Goalkeepers
Iain Hesford	GK	ENG	(Northern Rhodesia) Ndola	4 March 1960 (age 28)	Sunderland	December 1988	Swap deal
Gavin Kelly	GK	ENG	Beverley	29 September 1968 (age 19)	Academy	March 1984	–
Tony Norman	GK	WAL	Mancot	24 February 1958 (age 30)	Burnley	February 1980	Unknown
Defenders
Nicky Brown	DF	ENG	Hull	16 October 1966 (age 21)	Academy	September 1985	–
Neil Buckley	DF	ENG	Hull	25 September 1968 (age 19)	Academy	July 1985	–
Wayne Jacobs	DF	ENG	Sheffield	3 February 1969 (age 19)	Sheffield Wednesday	March 1988	Unknown
Richard Jobson	DF	ENG	Cottingham	9 May 1963 (age 25)	Watford	February 1985	£40,000
Paul Mudd	DF	ENG	Hull	13 November 1970 (age 17)	Academy	July 1988	–
Malcolm Murray	DF	SCO	Buckie	26 July 1964 (age 23)	(Scotland) Heart of Midlothian	March 1989	Unknown
Charlie Palmer	DF	ENG	Aylesbury	10 July 1963 (age 24)	Derby County	February 1987	£30,000
Peter Skipper	DF	ENG	Hull	11 April 1958 (age 30)	Darlington	August 1982	Unknown
Peter Swan	DF	ENG	Leeds	28 September 1966 (age 21)	Leeds United	March 1989	£200,000
Steve Terry	DF	ENG	Clapton	14 June 1962 (age 26)	Watford	June 1988	Unknown
Les Thompson	DF	ENG	Cleethorpes	23 September 1968 (age 19)	Grimsby Town	May 1987	Free
Lee Warren	DF	ENG	Manchester	28 February 1969 (age 19)	Rochdale	August 1988	Unknown
Midfielders
Billy Askew	MF	ENG	Great Lumley	2 October 1959 (age 28)	Middlesbrough	August 1982	Free
Dougie Bell	MF	SCO	Paisley	5 September 1959 (age 28)	Shrewsbury Town	March 1989	Loan
Mark Calvert	MF	ENG	Consett	11 September 1970 (age 17)	Academy	July 1988	–
Ray Daniel	MF	ENG	Luton	10 December 1964 (age 23)	Luton Town	June 1986	Unknown
Ken DeMange	MF	IRL	Dublin	3 September 1964 (age 23)	Leeds United	March 1988	£65,000
Leigh Jenkinson	MF	ENG	Thorne	9 July 1969 (age 18)	Academy	July 1986	–
Harry Ngata	MF	NZL	Whanganui	24 August 1971 (age 16)	(New Zealand) Porirua Viard United	December 1987	Free
Garreth Roberts	MF	ENG	Hull	15 November 1960 (age 27)	Academy	March 1979	–
Forwards
Alex Dyer	FW	ENG	Forest Gate	14 November 1965 (age 22)	Blackpool	February 1987	Unknown
Keith Edwards	FW	ENG	Stockton-on-Tees	16 July 1957 (age 30)	(Scotland) Aberdeen	March 1988	Unknown
Tim Hotte	FW	ENG	Bradford	4 October 1963 (age 24)	North Ferriby United	October 1987	£3,000
Ian McParland	FW	SCO	Edinburgh	4 October 1961 (age 26)	Notts County	March 1989	Unknown
John Moore	FW	HKG	(England) Consett	1 October 1966 (age 21)	Sunderland	August 1988	Unknown
Andy Payton	FW	ENG	Whalley	23 October 1967 (age 20)	Burnley	July 1985	Free
Andy Saville	FW	ENG	Hull	12 December 1964 (age 23)	Academy	December 1983	–
Mike Smith	FW	ENG	Hull	19 December 1968 (age 19)	Academy	May 1987	–
Billy Whitehurst	FW	ENG	Thurnscoe	10 June 1959 (age 29)	Sunderland	December 1988	Swap deal
