= 1985–86 Hull City A.F.C. season =

English football club season

Hull City
1985–86 season
- Chairman: Don Robinson
- Manager: Brian Horton
- Stadium: Boothferry Park
- Second Division: 6th
- FA Cup: Fourth round
- League Cup: Second round
- Full Members' Cup: Semi-finals
- Top goalscorer: League: Frankie Bunn (14); All: Frankie Bunn (20)
Home colours	Away colours

The 1985–86 season was the 82nd season in the history of Hull City Association Football Club and their first season in the Second Division since the 1977–78 campaign. In addition to the domestic league, the club would also participate in the FA Cup, the League Cup, and the Full Members' Cup.

== Competitions ==
=== Second Division ===
==== League table ====
Pos	Team	Pld	W	D	L	GF	GA	GD	Pts
4	Portsmouth	42	22	7	13	69	41	+28	73
5	Crystal Palace	42	19	9	14	57	52	+5	66
6	Hull City	42	17	13	12	65	55	+10	64
7	Sheffield United	42	17	11	14	64	63	+1	62
8	Oldham Athletic	42	17	9	16	62	61	+1	60

Rules for classification: 1) Points; 2) Goal difference; 3) Goals scored

==== Results summary ====
Overall								Home						Away					
Pld	W	D	L	GF	GA	GD	Pts	W	D	L	GF	GA	GD	W	D	L	GF	GA	GD
42	17	13	12	65	55	+10	64	11	7	3	39	19	+20	6	6	9	26	36	−10

Source: Soccerbase

==== Matches ====
Win Draw Loss

#	Date	Home	Result	Away	Venue	Att.	Scorers (Note: Hull scorers only)
1	17.08.85	Hull City	2–2	Portsmouth	H	8,221	Bunn, Whitehurst
2	24.08.85	Leeds United	1–1	Hull City	A	16,731	Jobson
3	26.08.85	Hull City	2–2	Blackburn Rovers	H	7,288	(o.g.), Bunn
4	31.08.85	Oldham Athletic	3–1	Hull City	A	4,500	Whitehurst
5	07.09.85	Hull City	0–0	Middlesbrough	H	7,710	
6	14.09.85	Bradford City	4–2	Hull City	A	4,930	McEwan, Swann
7	17.09.85	Hull City	3–0	Millwall	H	6,021	Bunn (2), McEwan
8	21.09.85	Hull City	4–0	Carlisle United	H	6,117	Doyle, Swann, Whitehurst, Roberts
9	28.09.85	Norwich City	2–0	Hull City	A	11,945	
10	01.10.85	Crystal Palace	0–2	Hull City	A	5,226	McEwan, Bunn
11	05.10.85	Hull City	0–2	Stoke City	H	6,890	
12	12.10.85	Sunderland	1–1	Hull City	A	16,613	Whitehurst
13	19.10.85	Hull City	3–1	Huddersfield Town	H	8,128	Whitehurst (2), Williams
14	26.10.85	Shrewsbury Town	0–0	Hull City	A	3,587	
15	02.11.85	Sheffield United	3–1	Hull City	A	13,272	Skipper
16	09.11.85	Hull City	5–0	Fulham	H	5,344	Whitehurst, Roberts, McEwan (2), Bunn
17	16.11.85	Charlton Athletic	1–2	Hull City	A	4,140	Bunn (2)
18	23.11.85	Hull City	1–1	Wimbledon	H	6,576	McEwan
19	30.11.85	Brighton & Hove Albion	3–1	Hull City	A	8,496	Saville
20	07.12.85	Hull City	1–2	Crystal Palace	H	6,058	Bunn
21	14.12.85	Portsmouth	1–1	Hull City	A	13,371	McEwan
22	22.12.85	Hull City	2–1	Leeds United	H	11,852	Jobson, Bunn
23	26.12.85	Hull City	2–0	Grimsby Town	H	12,824	Askew, Jobson
24	28.12.85	Millwall	5–0	Hull City	A	3,783	
25	01.01.86	Barnsley	1–4	Hull City	A	8,363	Jobson, McEwan, Doyle, Ring
26	11.01.86	Hull City	1–0	Bradford City	H	9,333	Jobson
27	18.01.86	Hull City	4–2	Oldham Athletic	H	6,909	Flounders (2), Jobson (2)
28	01.02.86	Blackburn Rovers	2–2	Hull City	A	5,414	Bunn, McEwan
29	25.02.86	Huddersfield Town	2–1	Hull City	A	4,518	Roberts
30	04.03.86	Hull City	4–3	Shrewsbury Town	H	6,253	Flounders (3), Bunn
31	08.03.86	Stoke City	0–1	Hull City	A	9,112	McEwan
32	11.03.86	Carlisle United	2–1	Hull City	A	3,248	Flounders
33	15.03.86	Hull City	1–1	Sunderland	H	9,295	Roberts
34	22.03.86	Middlesbrough	1–2	Hull City	A	6,227	Bunn, Flounders
35	29.03.86	Hull City	0–1	Barnsley	H	7,903	
36	01.04.86	Grimsby Town	0–1	Hull City	A	9,121	Flounders
37	05.04.86	Hull City	0–0	Sheffield United	H	9,645	
38	12.04.86	Fulham	1–1	Hull City	A	2,799	Bunn
39	19.04.86	Hull City	1–1	Charlton Athletic	H	7,139	Askew
40	26.04.86	Wimbledon	3–1	Hull City	A	5,171	Flounders
41	29.04.86	Hull City	1–0	Norwich City	H	6,146	Williams
42	02.05.86	Hull City	2–0	Brighton & Hove Albion	H	5,459	Flounders, Williams

=== FA Cup ===
==== Matches ====
Win Draw Loss

#	Date	Home	Result	Away	Venue	Att.	Scorers
3R	04.01.86	Hull City	2–2	Plymouth Argyle	H	6,776	Flounders (2)
3R	07.01.86	Plymouth Argyle	0–1	Hull City	A	13,940	Roberts
4R	25.02.86	Hull City	2–3	Brighton & Hove Albion	H	12,228	Roberts, McEwan

=== League Cup ===
==== Matches ====
Win Draw Loss

#	Date	Home	Result	Away	Venue	Att.	Scorers
1R	20.08.85	Halifax Town	1–1	Hull City	A	820	Flounders
1R	03.09.85	Hull City	3–0	Halifax Town	H	3,299	Bunn (2), Whitehurst
2R	24.09.85	Queens Park Rangers	3–0	Hull City	A	7,021	
2R	08.10.85	Hull City	1–5	Queens Park Rangers	H	4,287	Whitehurst

=== Full Members' Cup ===
==== Matches ====
Win Draw Loss

#	Date	Home	Result	Away	Venue	Att.	Scorers
1R	23.10.85	Hull City	4–1	Bradford City	H	2,177	Bunn (2), McEwan, Whitehurst
2R	05.11.85	Hull City	3–1	Middlesbrough	H	2,637	Bunn, Whitehurst (2)
SF	26.11.85	Hull City	2–1	Manchester City	H	5,213	Bunn, McEwan
SF	11.12.85	Manchester City	2–0	Hull City	H	10,180	

== Squad ==
Name	Position	Nationality	Place of birth	Date of birth (age) (Note: Players' ages listed as they were on 1 July 1985, the official start date of the 1985–86 season)	Previous club	Date signed	Fee
Goalkeepers
John Davies	GK	WAL	Llandysul	18 November 1959 (age 25)	(Wales) Cardiff City	June 1980	£12,000
Gavin Kelly	GK	ENG	Beverley	29 September 1968 (age 16)	Academy	March 1984	–
Tony Norman	GK	WAL	Mancot	24 February 1958 (age 27)	Burnley	February 1980	Unknown
Defenders
Steve Brentano	DF	ENG	Hull	9 November 1961 (age 23)	North Ferriby United	March 1982	Unknown
Nicky Brown	DF	ENG	Hull	16 October 1966 (age 18)	Academy	September 1985	–
Neil Buckley	DF	ENG	Hull	25 September 1968 (age 16)	Academy	July 1985	–
Pat Heard	DF	ENG	Hull	17 March 1960 (age 25)	Middlesbrough	March 1986	Unknown
Richard Jobson	DF	ENG	Cottingham	9 May 1963 (age 22)	Watford	February 1985	£40,000
Stan McEwan	DF	SCO	Newmains	8 June 1957 (age 28)	Exeter City	March 1984	Unknown
Lawrie Pearson	DF	ENG	Wallsend	2 July 1965 (age 19)	Gateshead	July 1984	Unknown
Peter Skipper	DF	ENG	Hull	11 April 1958 (age 27)	Darlington	August 1982	Unknown
Gary Swann	DF	ENG	York	11 April 1962 (age 23)	Academy	July 1980	–
Midfielders
Billy Askew	MF	ENG	Great Lumley	2 October 1959 (age 25)	Middlesbrough	August 1982	Free
Steve Corkain	MF	ENG	Stockton-on-Tees	25 February 1967 (age 18)	Academy	July 1985	–
Bobby Doyle	MF	SCO	Dumbarton	27 December 1953 (age 31)	Portsmouth	August 1985	Unknown
Brian Horton	MF	ENG	Hednesford	4 February 1949 (age 36)	Luton Town	June 1984	Unknown
Paul Olsson	MF	ENG	Hull	24 December 1965 (age 19)	Academy	January 1984	–
Garry Parker	MF	ENG	Oxford	7 September 1965 (age 19)	Luton Town	February 1986	£70,000
Garreth Roberts	MF	ENG	Hull	15 November 1960 (age 24)	Academy	March 1979	–
Neil Williams	MF	ENG	Waltham Abbey	23 October 1964 (age 20)	Watford	July 1984	Free
Forwards
Frankie Bunn	FW	ENG	Birmingham	6 November 1962 (age 22)	Luton Town	July 1985	Unknown
Andy Flounders	FW	ENG	Hull	13 December 1963 (age 21)	Academy	October 1980	–
Andy Payton	FW	ENG	Whalley	23 October 1967 (age 17)	Burnley	July 1985	Free
Mike Ring	FW	ENG	Brighton	13 February 1961 (age 24)	(Northern Ireland) Ballymena United	July 1984	Unknown
Andy Saville	FW	ENG	Hull	12 December 1964 (age 20)	Academy	December 1983	–
Billy Whitehurst	FW	ENG	Thurnscoe	10 June 1959 (age 26)	Mexborough Town	October 1980	Unknown
