= 1987–88 Hull City A.F.C. season =

English football club season

Hull City
1987–88 season
- Chairman: Don Robinson
- Manager: Brian Horton (until 12 April); Dennis Booth & Tom Wilson (interims, from 12 April)
- Stadium: Boothferry Park
- Second Division: 15th
- FA Cup: Third round
- League Cup: Second round
- Full Members' Cup: First round
- Top goalscorer: League: Alex Dyer (8); Garry Parker (8); All: Alex Dyer (9)
Home colours	Away colours

The 1987–88 season was the 84th season in the history of Hull City Association Football Club and their third consecutive season in the Second Division. In addition to the domestic league, the club would also participate in the FA Cup, the League Cup, and the Full Members' Cup.

== Competitions ==
=== Second Division ===
==== League table ====
Pos	Team	Pld	W	D	L	GF	GA	GD	Pts
13	Leicester City	44	16	11	17	62	61	+1	59
14	Barnsley	44	15	12	17	61	62	−1	57
15	Hull City	44	14	15	15	54	60	−6	57
16	Plymouth Argyle	44	16	8	20	65	67	−2	56
17	Bournemouth	44	13	10	21	56	68	−12	49

Rules for classification: 1) Points; 2) Goal difference; 3) Goals scored

==== Results summary ====
Overall								Home						Away					
Pld	W	D	L	GF	GA	GD	Pts	W	D	L	GF	GA	GD	W	D	L	GF	GA	GD
44	14	15	15	54	60	−6	57	10	8	4	32	22	+10	4	7	11	22	38	−16

Source: Soccerbase

==== Matches ====
Win Draw Loss

#	Date	Home	Result	Away	Venue	Att.	Scorers (Note: Hull scorers only)
1	15.08.87	Hull City	2–2	Blackburn Rovers	H	6,426	Bunn, Skipper
2	18.08.87	Stoke City	1–1	Hull City	A	9,139	Parker
3	22.08.87	Crystal Palace	2–2	Hull City	A	6,688	Parker, Bunn
4	29.08.87	Hull City	2–1	Aston Villa	H	8,315	Heard, Dyer
5	31.08.87	Swindon Town	0–0	Hull City	A	9,600	
6	05.09.87	Hull City	2–1	Bournemouth	H	5,807	Dyer, Askew
7	12.09.87	Leeds United	0–2	Hull City	A	18,205	Dyer, Parker
8	15.09.87	Hull City	1–1	Shrewsbury Town	H	7,939	Roberts
9	19.09.87	Hull City	1–0	Oldham Athletic	H	7,183	Skipper
10	29.09.87	Hull City	3–1	Manchester City	H	9,650	Parker, Bunn (2)
11	03.10.87	Sheffield United	2–1	Hull City	A	10,446	Bunn
12	10.10.87	Hull City	1–0	Ipswich Town	H	6,962	Thompson
13	17.10.87	Barnsley	1–3	Hull City	A	7,310	Saville, Heard, Askew
14	20.10.87	Huddersfield Town	0–2	Hull City	A	8,033	Thompson, Parker
15	24.10.87	Hull City	2–2	Leicester City	H	8,826	Roberts, Williams
16	31.10.87	Plymouth Argyle	3–1	Hull City	A	8,550	Saville
17	03.11.87	Hull City	0–0	Bradford City	H	15,443	
18	07.11.87	Hull City	2–0	Birmingham City	H	7,901	Williams, (o.g.)
19	14.11.87	Middlesbrough	1–0	Hull City	A	15,709	
20	21.11.87	Hull City	1–0	West Bromwich Albion	H	7,654	Askew
21	28.11.87	Millwall	2–0	Hull City	A	6,743	
22	05.12.87	Hull City	2–2	Reading	H	5,797	Dyer, Parker
23	12.12.87	Shrewsbury Town	2–2	Hull City	A	2,588	Roberts, Saville
24	19.12.87	Hull City	2–1	Crystal Palace	H	6,780	Parker, Dyer
25	28.12.87	Oldham Athletic	1–2	Hull City	A	8,080	Heard, Dyer
26	01.01.88	Aston Villa	5–0	Hull City	A	19,236	
27	03.01.88	Hull City	3–1	Leeds United	H	14,694	Payton, Jobson, Dyer
28	16.01.88	Blackburn Rovers	2–1	Hull City	A	9,692	Jobson
29	06.02.88	Bournemouth	6–2	Hull City	A	5,901	Payton, Dyer
30	13.02.88	Hull City	0–0	Stoke City	H	6,424	
31	27.02.88	Hull City	1–2	Sheffield United	H	8,832	Saville
32	02.03.88	Manchester City	2–0	Hull City	A	16,040	
33	05.03.88	Hull City	1–2	Barnsley	H	7,622	Saville
34	12.03.88	Ipswich Town	2–0	Hull City	A	9,728	
35	19.03.88	Hull City	1–1	Plymouth Argyle	H	5,172	Parker
36	26.03.88	Leicester City	2–1	Hull City	A	10,353	Edwards
37	02.04.88	Birmingham City	1–1	Hull City	A	7,059	Heard
38	04.04.88	Hull City	0–0	Middlesbrough	H	10,758	
39	09.04.88	Bradford City	2–0	Hull City	A	13,659	
40	12.04.88	Hull City	1–4	Swindon Town	H	4,583	Jenkinson
41	23.04.88	Hull City	4–0	Huddersfield Town	H	5,221	Edwards (2), Daniel, Saville
42	30.04.88	West Bromwich Albion	1–1	Hull City	A	8,004	Daniel
43	02.05.88	Hull City	0–1	Millwall	H	10,811	
44	07.05.88	Reading	0–0	Hull City	A	6,710	

=== FA Cup ===
==== Matches ====
Win Draw Loss

#	Date	Home	Result	Away	Venue	Att.	Scorers
3R	09.01.88	Watford	1–1	Hull City	A	12,761	Roberts
3R	12.01.88	Hull City	2–2	Watford	H	13,681	Williams, Dyer
3R	18.01.88	Watford	0–1	Hull City	A	15,261	

=== League Cup ===
==== Matches ====
Win Draw Loss

#	Date	Home	Result	Away	Venue	Att.	Scorers
2R	23.09.87	Manchester United	5–0	Hull City	A	25,041	
2R	07.10.87	Hull City	0–1	Manchester United	H	13,586	

=== Full Members' Cup ===
==== Matches ====
Win Draw Loss

#	Date	Home	Result	Away	Venue	Att.	Scorers
1R	10.11.87	Charlton Athletic	1–1 (Note: Charlton Athletic won the tie 4–2 on penalties)	Hull City	A	1,338	Roberts

== Squad ==
Name	Position	Nationality	Place of birth	Date of birth (age) (Note: Players' ages listed as they were on 1 July 1987, the official start date of the 1987–88 season)	Previous club	Date signed	Fee
Goalkeepers
Gavin Kelly	GK	ENG	Beverley	29 September 1968 (age 18)	Academy	March 1984	–
Tony Norman	GK	WAL	Mancot	24 February 1958 (age 29)	Burnley	February 1980	Unknown
Defenders
Nicky Brown	DF	ENG	Hull	16 October 1966 (age 20)	Academy	September 1985	–
Neil Buckley	DF	ENG	Hull	25 September 1968 (age 18)	Academy	July 1985	–
Pat Heard	DF	ENG	Hull	17 March 1960 (age 27)	Middlesbrough	March 1986	Unknown
Wayne Jacobs	DF	ENG	Sheffield	3 February 1969 (age 18)	Sheffield Wednesday	March 1988	Unknown
Richard Jobson	DF	ENG	Cottingham	9 May 1963 (age 24)	Watford	February 1985	£40,000
Stan McEwan	DF	SCO	Newmains	8 June 1957 (age 30)	Exeter City	March 1984	Unknown
Charlie Palmer	DF	ENG	Aylesbury	10 July 1963 (age 23)	Derby County	February 1987	£30,000
Peter Skipper	DF	ENG	Hull	11 April 1958 (age 29)	Darlington	August 1982	Unknown
Les Thompson	DF	ENG	Cleethorpes	23 September 1968 (age 18)	Grimsby Town	May 1987	Free
Midfielders
Billy Askew	MF	ENG	Great Lumley	2 October 1959 (age 27)	Middlesbrough	August 1982	Free
Ray Daniel	MF	ENG	Luton	10 December 1964 (age 22)	Luton Town	June 1986	Unknown
Ken DeMange	MF	IRL	Dublin	3 September 1964 (age 22)	Leeds United	March 1988	£65,000
Leigh Jenkinson	MF	ENG	Thorne	9 July 1969 (age 17)	Academy	July 1986	–
Harry Ngata	MF	NZL	Whanganui	24 August 1971 (age 15)	(New Zealand) Porirua Viard United	December 1987	Free
Garry Parker	MF	ENG	Oxford	7 September 1965 (age 21)	Luton Town	February 1986	£70,000
Garreth Roberts	MF	ENG	Hull	15 November 1960 (age 26)	Academy	March 1979	–
Neil Williams	MF	ENG	Waltham Abbey	23 October 1964 (age 22)	Watford	July 1984	Free
Forwards
Peter Barnes	FW	ENG	Manchester	10 June 1957 (age 30)	Manchester City	March 1988	Free
Frankie Bunn	FW	ENG	Birmingham	6 November 1962 (age 24)	Luton Town	July 1985	Unknown
Alex Dyer	FW	ENG	Forest Gate	14 November 1965 (age 21)	Blackpool	February 1987	Unknown
Keith Edwards	FW	ENG	Stockton-on-Tees	16 July 1957 (age 29)	(Scotland) Aberdeen	March 1988	Unknown
Tim Hotte	FW	ENG	Bradford	4 October 1963 (age 23)	North Ferriby United	October 1987	£3,000
Gordon Owen	FW	ENG	Barnsley	14 June 1959 (age 28)	Bristol City	December 1987	Loan
Andy Payton	FW	ENG	Whalley	23 October 1967 (age 19)	Burnley	July 1985	Free
Andy Saville	FW	ENG	Hull	12 December 1964 (age 22)	Academy	December 1983	–
Mike Smith	FW	ENG	Hull	19 December 1968 (age 18)	Academy	May 1987	–
