= Brian Horton =

English footballer & manager

Personal information
- Full name: Brian Horton
- Date of birth: 4 February 1949 (age 77)
- Place of birth: Hednesford, England
- Height: 5 ft 10 in (1.78 m)
- Position: Wing-half

Youth career
- 1964–1966: Walsall

Senior career*
Years	Team	Apps	(Gls)
1966–1970	Hednesford Town		
1970–1976	Port Vale	236	(33)
1976–1981	Brighton & Hove Albion	218	(33)
1981–1984	Luton Town	118	(8)
1984–1986	Hull City	38	(0)
Total		610	(74)

Managerial career
- 1984–1988: Hull City
- 1988–1993: Oxford United
- 1993–1995: Manchester City
- 1995–1997: Huddersfield Town
- 1998–1999: Brighton & Hove Albion
- 1999–2004: Port Vale
- 2004–2006: Macclesfield Town
- 2012: Macclesfield Town
- * Club domestic league appearances and goals

Brian "Nobby" Horton (born 4 February 1949) is an English former footballer and manager. He spent 16 years as a professional player and 22 years as a manager, making 688 appearances and managing 1,098 matches. In addition to this, he spent four years as a semi-professional player and around 11 years as a coach and assistant manager.

Horton played at wing-half, though he was forced to find employment as a builder after being released from Walsall's youth team in 1966. He joined Hednesford Town in the West Midlands (Regional) League, winning the Staffordshire Senior Cup in his final appearance for the club in 1970. He turned professional by signing with Port Vale of the English Football League in July 1970. He established himself in the first team, making 258 appearances, before being sold to Brighton & Hove Albion for £30,000 in March 1976. Installed as club captain, he helped the club to win promotions to the First Division from the Third Division in 1976–77 and 1978–79, being named on the PFA Team of the Year on both occasions. He also won the club's Player of the Year in 1977. Having played 251 games for the club, he was transferred to Luton Town in August 1981. He captained the team to the Second Division title in 1981–82 and helped the club to remain in the First Division, playing 132 games in league and cup competitions.

Horton was installed as player-manager at Hull City in June 1984 and led the club to promotion out of the Third Division in 1984–85. He was sacked in April 1988 and was appointed as Oxford United's assistant manager the following month. He succeeded Mark Lawrenson as Oxford manager in October of that year. He managed to keep the club in the Second Division for five seasons despite a financial crisis caused by the death of owner Robert Maxwell. Horton was the surprise appointment as Manchester City manager in August 1993 and kept the club competitive in the Premier League before being dismissed by new club chairman Francis Lee in May 1995. He took charge at Huddersfield Town the following month but was sacked with the club bottom of the Second Division in October 1997. He returned to his former club Brighton & Hove Albion as manager in February 1998, who were struggling near the foot of the Third Division and forced to play home games at Priestfield Stadium in Gillingham. He moved to another former club, Port Vale, in January 1999. Vale were relegated out of the First Division in 2000. However, Horton won his first trophy in management as they secured the Football League Trophy in 2001. He resigned in February 2004 following a change in ownership.

He took charge at Macclesfield Town in April 2004, steering the club away from the Third Division relegation zone. He spent two full seasons in charge before being sacked in October 2006. Having spent some time out of the game, he returned to Hull City as Phil Brown's assistant manager in May 2007. The club were promoted to the Premier League, though the two were sacked in March 2010. He spent 2011 as Phil Brown's assistant at Preston North End and then returned to management with Macclesfield Town in March 2012, though he was unable to prevent the club from being relegated from the Football League. He joined Doncaster Rovers as Paul Dickov's assistant in June 2013, before he was appointed as football coordinator at Southend United by Phil Brown in August 2015. He later assisted Phil Brown at Swindon Town for two months, leaving the club in May 2018. He has been married twice and has twins.

== Playing career ==
=== Hednesford Town ===
Born in Hednesford, Staffordshire, Horton's father, Richard, was a coal miner at the North Staffordshire Coalfield and his mother, Irene, worked as a cook at Cannock Grammar School. He started his career as a member of Walsall's youth team at the age of 15. He played regularly in the West Midlands (Regional) League, though was released after two years without having appeared for the first-team, and joined hometown club Hednesford Town in the West Midlands (Regional) League after being signed by player-manager Dick Neal. During his time at the club he worked in the building trade in the Walsall area. He became known as Nobby to fans, a nickname that stuck with him throughout his career, after a supporter stated that Horton played like Nobby Stiles. He won the Staffordshire Senior Cup in his final appearance for the club, a victory over Kidderminster Harriers.

=== Port Vale ===
Horton returned to the Football League at the age of 21 when he signed for newly-promoted Third Division club Port Vale in July 1970. It was reported that his transfer fee was a pint of shandy, as Vale were struggling financially and simply haggled with the Hednesford Town chairman by plying him with alcohol, therefore his transfer fee was 'a pint of shandy'. Port Vale agreed to play a pre-season friendly with Hednesford and allowed them to keep all the gate receipt money from the match. Horton had been earning £7-a-week at Hednesford, rising to £20 with win bonuses, supplemented by a £20-a-week income from building work, and so actually took a significant pay cut to turn professional at Port Vale on wages of £23-a-week.

A first-team regular from the start under manager Gordon Lee, Horton played 40 games in the 1970–71 season, and scored his first competitive goal in a 3–2 win against Bury at Gigg Lane. He then found his scoring form in the 1971–72 campaign, as he hit eight goals in 47 appearances; he also became the club's penalty taker, with half of his goals coming from the spot. He hit seven goals in 43 games in the 1972–73 season, four of his strikes coming from the penalty spot. He missed a period around Christmas due to injury, and during this time his teammates struggled to find results; this ultimately cost the "Valiants", as they finished four points behind promoted Notts County. The injury had come in a 2–0 defeat at Charlton Athletic, when a knee-high tackle left him with a hairline fracture of the leg, which also caused him to miss an FA Cup third round tie with West Ham United.

Lee changed the team's formation from 4–4–2 to 4–3–3 for the 1973–74 campaign, hoping that this would allow Horton more room in the centre of the field. However, Vale's form suffered, and Lee was replaced as manager by Roy Sproson in January. Vale finished the campaign one place above the relegation zone, though were seven points clear of the relegation zone. Horton played 46 games, scoring four goals. Vale missed out on promotion by just four points at the end of the 1974–75 season, as Horton hit 13 goals in 47 games, leaving him one goal behind top-scorers Ray Williams and Terry Bailey. He hit four goals in 35 games in the 1975–76 season, including both of Vale's goals in a win over Millwall at Vale Park. Much to the disappointment of Vale supporters, he was sold to league rivals Brighton & Hove Albion in March 1976 for a fee of £30,000. Their offer trumped the £25,000. offered by both Hereford United and Plymouth Argyle.

=== Brighton & Hove Albion ===
Manager Peter Taylor immediately installed Horton as club captain, giving him a contract worth £100-a-week. Brighton finished fourth at the end of the 1975–76 season, three points shy of promotion, and Taylor quit the club. Incoming manager Alan Mullery had planned to also play in midfield for the club but after witnessing Horton in his first training session he came to the conclusion that Horton would provide the necessary leadership and skill on the pitch, so Mullery retired as a player to concentrate fully on management. For his performances at both Vale and Brighton, Horton was named on the PFA Team of the Year, along with Brighton teammates Graham Cross and Peter Ward. The "Seagulls" finished second in 1976–77 under Mullery's stewardship, and thus were promoted into the Second Division. Mullery was However, disappointed in his players after they won only one of their final four games to miss out on the chance of winning the divisional title. Horton was named as the club's Player of the Year, ahead of 36-goal record-breaking top-scorer Peter Ward.

Albion made a fourth-place finish to the 1977–78 season, missing out on promotion to the First Division only because third-placed Tottenham Hotspur had superior goal difference. Undeterred, Brighton won promotion as runners-up in 1978–79, one point behind champions Crystal Palace and one point ahead of fourth-place Sunderland. Horton was named on the PFA Team of the Year for a second time, alongside teammate Mark Lawrenson. Brighton played top-flight football for the first time in their history in the 1979–80 season. The team got off to a poor start amidst discontent with the club's board over bonus pay, losing four of their opening five games and sinking to bottom of the league by November. However, they ended Nottingham Forest's 42-game unbeaten run. They would do the double over Brian Clough's team that season. They finished in 16th-place, some six points clear of the relegation zone. The 1980–81 season was a much narrower affair. Still, Brighton finished in 19th place, two points clear of relegated Norwich City, having won their final three games of the campaign. Mullery left the club and was replaced by Mike Bailey, who wanted Horton out of the club. He left the Goldstone Ground having scored 47 goals in 251 league and cup games.

=== Luton Town ===
Horton transferred to Luton Town in August 1981, as the club were competing in the Second Division under the stewardship of David Pleat. He was signed to replace Alan West, who had been sold to Millwall. Horton was installed as captain and told to play a more attacking midfield role than he had previously been used to, playing in between a midfield three with Lil Fuccillo and Ricky Hill. He was again promoted into the top-flight, as the "Hatters" topped the Second Division table in 1981–82 by an eight-point margin, some 18 points clear of fourth-place Sheffield Wednesday. He was named on the PFA Team of the Year for the third time in his career, alongside teammates Kirk Stephens, Ricky Hill, and David Moss.

Luton then went on to escape relegation on the final day of the 1982–83 season at Maine Road, following a 1–0 over Manchester City, who took their place in the relegation zone. The match became famous for the images of David Pleat dancing across the pitch in jubilation. Pleat ran straight to Horton after finishing his dance and kissed his out-of-contract midfielder, telling him "you can go anywhere you want to". However, in the tunnel Horton was punched by Dennis Tueart, starting a brawl amongst the players. Horton was offered a contract by Chelsea, but could not agree on terms with the chairman Ken Bates, and instead signed a new two-year contract with Luton. Horton left Kenilworth Road after the 1983–84 campaign, as the club secured their top-flight status with a 16-place finish. He had played 131 first-team games for the club, scoring 14 goals. His next move was to Hull City, who appointed him their player-manager, and with whom he ended his playing career in 1986 after making 46 competitive appearances.

=== Style of play ===
Horton was a fiercely competitive wing-half who was skilled at tackling and passing.

== Managerial career ==
=== Hull City ===
Horton became player-manager of Hull City in July 1984 and led his side to promotion to the Second Division at the end of the 1984–85 season. He quickly built up a reputation as a "strong-minded, tactically-aware coach." Due to the League Cup draw, three of his first four games as manager were against Lincoln City, and his very first game in charge was a 0–0 draw at Sincil Bank. In November, his team came from 4–1 down to beat Leyton Orient 5–4 after he instructed assistant manager Chris Chilton to "get some verbals going" at half-time. He signed former Luton Town teammate Frankie Bunn as a replacement for top-scorer Billy Whitehurst, who he sold to Newcastle United for £232,000. Hull went on a 14-match unbeaten run in all competitions during the middle of the 1984–85 season, followed by a run of 12 wins in 15 league matches in March and April that secured promotion with two games remaining. Horton dropped himself from the Hull side in February 1985 as the club's promotion challenge gathered momentum. After promotion was secured, Horton was offered a place on the board of directors.

The club had an excellent youth policy, which saw talent such as Andy Payton and Leigh Jenkinson develop, though Nick Barmby was such a prodigious talent that he was signed to Tottenham Hotspur at the age of 16. Horton also brought in defender Richard Jobson from Watford for £40,000 and Garry Parker from former club Luton for £72,000. He attempted to sign Mark Bright from Leicester City for £45,000, but the chairman could not agree terms with the player. The 1985–86 season saw Hull come very close to earning promotion to the First Division, finishing in sixth-place, which was then the third-highest finish in the club's history. At the end of the campaign Horton quit playing to concentrate on full-time management, having been sent off against Crystal Palace in his final appearance. Despite the introduction of the play-off system in 1986–87, the "Tigers" ended the campaign in 14th-place.

The 1987–88 campaign began promisingly, and Hull was in the top six, chasing the automatic promotion places by the halfway stage. However, a dreadful run of results in which there was just one win in 17 games ended any hope of promotion. Their form was not helped by the sale of star play-maker Garry Parker to Nottingham Forest for a £270,000 fee, which Horton later admitted was a mistake. After a 4–1 home defeat to Swindon Town, chairman Don Robinson was furious and immediately fired Horton. The players took responsibility for the defeat and urged the chairman to reconsider. Robinson obliged, but Horton refused the offer of reinstatement. During his reign he turned down the opportunity to sign apprentice Dean Windass.

=== Oxford United ===
Horton's next move was to become assistant to former Brighton teammate Mark Lawrenson, now rookie manager at Second Division Oxford United in May 1988. Lawrenson left the Manor Ground in October 1988 after star player Dean Saunders was sold to Derby County without his consent, and the board elected Horton as his replacement; at the time both Derby and Oxford were owned by members of Robert Maxwell's family. The million pound fee for Saunders allowed Horton to build a squad of his own: former Brighton teammate Steve Foster (Luton Town), Wales international Andy Melville (£270,000 from Swansea City), New Zealand international Ceri Evans (free agent), defensive midfielder Mickey Lewis (part-exchange to Derby for Trevor Hebberd), Jim Magilton (£100,000 from Liverpool), John Durnin (£250,000 from Liverpool), and England under-21 international winger Paul Simpson (£200,000 from Manchester City). He also gave débuts to Joey Beauchamp and Paul Kee. Under his leadership, Oxford finished the 1988–89 Second Division campaign in 17th place. In preparation for the 1989–90 campaign, he exploited the relationship between Derby and Oxford to sign Dave Penney for £175,000. On the pitch, it was a case of deja vu, as Oxford finished the season in 17th place, again with 54 points. Hoping to build a promotion-winning squad for the 1990–91 campaign, he bought Doncaster Rovers defender Les Robinson for £150,000. The "Yellows" finished in tenth place, eight points off the play-off places.

The club faced a financial crisis following the mysterious death of Robert Maxwell, and over the summer, Horton was forced to sell striker Martin Foyle to Port Vale for £375,000. He made no major signings in Foyle's place and instead handed débuts to Paul Wanless, Chris Allen, and Bobby Ford. He also sold Paul Simpson to Derby for £650,000 in February 1992. The loss of close to £1 million of talent showed on the pitch, as Oxford ended the 1991–92 season one place and two points ahead of relegated Plymouth Argyle. They secured their safety with a final-day win over Tranmere Rovers. At the end of the season, he gave Steve McClaren his first job in management, putting him in charge of Oxford's youth team. There was less drama in 1992–93, as his side finished in 14th-place, seven points above the relegation zone. Over the summer, he paid Corby Town £20,000 for striker Matt Murphy, and sold Andy Melville on to Sunderland for £500,000.

=== Manchester City ===
In August 1993, four games after the start of the 1993–94 Premier League campaign, Horton resigned as Oxford manager to replace Peter Reid as manager of Manchester City – to the surprise of many supporters and commentators, who were expecting the appointment of someone more high-profile. Horton initially told chairman Peter Swales that "we have the makings, the backbone of a really good squad" and that he was satisfied in not making many additions if it meant keeping hold of the existing squad; he cancelled a pre-arranged sale of Steve Lomas to Preston North End. City's previous three seasons in the top-flight had yielded top-ten finishes, but Horton struggled with injuries – key striker Niall Quinn was missing through a cruciate ligament injury – and City were 20th and bottom in mid-February. He traded eight-year club veteran striker David White to Leeds United in exchange for David Rocastle; Rocastle failed to live up to expectations, and scored just two league goals. But then Horton transformed his attack by signing Uwe Rösler (Nürnberg), Paul Walsh (£750,000 from Portsmouth) and Peter Beagrie (£1.1 million from Everton), and City escaped relegation after losing only two of their last 14 games of the season.

Horton played with two out-and-out wingers in 1994–95: Peter Beagrie and £1.3million summer signing Nicky Summerbee (Swindon Town). This led to Rösler, Walsh and Quinn scoring 47 goals between them, but also to some heavy defeats, such as the 5–0 loss to rivals Manchester United. City were sixth on 3 December and there was talk of a much-awaited return to European football, as young talents such as Garry Flitcroft, Richard Edghill, and Steve Lomas came to the fore. However, they won only four of their remaining 25 league games, finishing just four points clear of relegation, and Horton was sacked. His sacking was predicted by many, as Francis Lee had taken over as chairman after Horton's appointment and wished to have his 'own man' in the dugout at Maine Road. City went on to suffer relegation the following season under Alan Ball and Horton said that "once I had left, Francis made transfers which I could not fathom".

=== Huddersfield Town ===
Horton made a swift return to management with Huddersfield Town, a club that had just won promotion to the First Division under Neil Warnock, who announced his surprise resignation days after the club's play-off success. Horton had been recommended to the club by Trevor Cherry. The "Terriers" started the 1995–96 campaign positively and enjoyed a mid-season run of just two defeats in 19 games. They also reached the fifth round of the FA Cup, where they lost to Premier League Wimbledon in a replay at Plough Lane. The team were on course for a play-off place, but a run of just three wins in their final 13 games left them in eighth-place, eight points behind sixth-placed Charlton Athletic.

Horton broke the club's transfer record when he splashed out £1.2 million on Bristol Rovers striker Marcus Stewart. However, he also sold top-scorer Andy Booth to Sheffield Wednesday for £2.7 million. Huddersfield finished the 1996–97 season just two places and eight points ahead of relegated Grimsby Town. Huddersfield had suffered injuries throughout the spine of the team as midfielder Lee Makel, striker Marcus Stewart and defender Andy Morrison (£500,000 from Blackpool) missed much of the campaign due to injury, though £325,000 summer signing Andy Payton proved to be a revelation, hitting 19 goals in all competitions. Horton was sacked in October 1997 following a defeat to Nottingham Forest at the Kirklees Stadium that left Huddersfield bottom of the table.

=== Brighton & Hove Albion ===
In February 1998, Horton returned to one of his old clubs when he became manager of Brighton & Hove Albion. The club were second-from-bottom in the Third Division and playing their home games 75 miles (121 km) away at Gillingham's Priestfield Stadium. He led the club to victory over Chester City, Brighton's first win in five months. The "Seagulls" secured their Football League status in April after winning a point at league leaders Notts County. They went on to finish the 1997–98 season second-from-bottom, 15 points clear of relegated Doncaster Rovers.

Aiming for a complete overhaul of the playing squad and unimpressed by the reserve and youth teams, Horton told chairman Dick Knight "I want 18 out and 18 in". One of the new arrivals was Gary Hart, signed from Stansted of the Essex Senior Football League for £1,000 and a set of kit. Other signings included Jamie Moralee (Crewe Alexandra) and Ian Culverhouse (Kingstonian), whilst he brought Martin Hinshelwood and Dean Wilkins onto the backroom staff. One unusual but effective piece of business was midfielder Paul Holsgrove, who Horton signed on a free transfer from Stoke City and then sold to Hibernian for £113,000 in the same transfer window. Brighton started the 1998–99 campaign well, though Horton left the club in January 1999 to take charge of another of his old clubs, Port Vale, after the sacking of long-serving manager John Rudge.

=== Port Vale ===
To help the Vale to avoid relegation at the end of the 1998–99 season, Horton brought in five players: Dave Brammer (Manchester City), Tony Butler (Blackpool), Carl Griffiths (Leyton Orient), Alex Smith (Chester City), and Chris Allen (Nottingham Forest). This spending spree set the club back £630,000, and so Horton first sold off Peter Beadle to Notts County for £250,000 to raise the cash needed for his new signings. He won his first game in charge, a 2–0 win over Huddersfield Town, thanks to a brace from Martin Foyle. A five-game unbeaten run in April allowed the Vale to finish above relegated Bury on goals scored.

In a bid to survive another season in the First Division, Horton allowed ten players to leave Vale Park; the most significant departure was Neil Aspin, as the 34-year-old dropped down two divisions as his career wound down. To replace these players, Horton signed three players on free transfers: Jeff Minton from former club Brighton, Tommy Widdrington from Grimsby Town, and Steve Rimmer from Manchester City. As the season progressed, he released Marcus Bent and sold Carl Griffiths back to Leyton Orient for £100,000. He further sold highly rated young centre-back Anthony Gardner to Tottenham Hotspur for £1 million, and sold Tony Butler to West Bromwich Albion for £140,000. In their place he signed Micky Cummins, Mark Goodlad, Sagi Burton, and Ville Viljanen; and also took Martin Bullock, Gareth Taylor, and David Healy in on loan. His side finished second-from-bottom and was relegated in his first full season as manager. At the end of the campaign, Martin Foyle retired, whilst key players Paul Musselwhite and Ian Bogie also departed.

In preparation for life in the Second Division, Horton signed Dean Delany, Marc Bridge-Wilkinson and Michael Twiss on free transfers. Horton came under pressure from the board at the start of the 2000–01 campaign, as his team went 13 games without a win, and were knocked out of the FA Cup by non-League Canvey Island. Horton described it as "the greatest embarrassment of my football career". He responded to this humiliation by placing five players on the transfer list. He signed Steve Brooker for £15,000; brought in Onandi Lowe and Richard Burgess on free transfer, whilst also offloading Jeff Minton to Rotherham United. Vale's form improved, as they avoided defeat to Stoke City in both Potteries derby games. Horton was named Manager of the Month in March, after a good run of results ended fears of a second successive relegation. He also won his first trophy as a manager as Vale lifted the Football League Trophy, coming from behind to beat Brentford at the Millennium Stadium. Vale upset supporters by selling Dave Brammer to Crewe Alexandra for £500,000.

The club entered a financial crisis following the collapse of ITV Digital, which cost the club £400,000 in revenue. This meant Horton had to build his squad for the 2001–02 season entirely on free transfers, the most influential proving to be former Coventry City striker Stephen McPhee. Vale beat rivals Stoke City but ended the season in 14th place. Horton was named Manager of the Month after his team earned 13 points from a possible 18 in February. Horton signed Jon McCarthy, Brett Angell, Ian Brightwell, Phil Charnock, Sam Collins, and Mark Boyd for the 2002–03 campaign. Four straight defeats were followed by five consecutive victories, as he supplemented his squad with the additions of Lee Ashcroft, Peter Clarke and Adrian Littlejohn. Though relegation was avoided, Horton still remained unpopular with some sections of the Vale's supporters. However, the season was dominated by off-the-field issues, as Vale entered administration, and were taken over by Bill Bratt's fan-based consortium.

Building for the 2003–04 campaign, Horton had to find a replacement for departing defender Matt Carragher. He found his replacement in Everton's reliable young George Pilkington; he also signed goalkeeper Jonny Brain and Austrian defender Andreas Lipa. By the start of the campaign Horton had completed the rebuilding of his squad that was necessitated by the financial crisis and the ageing of the highly successful side of the mid-1990s. A good start saw the club top of the table and Horton was named as Manager of the Month. The Vale were one point outside the play-offs by February, at which point Horton tendered his resignation.

=== Macclesfield Town ===
Linked with the management position at Swansea City, Horton was instead appointed as manager of struggling Third Division club Macclesfield Town at the start of April 2004, replacing John Askey, who stayed on as a coach. This was initially until the end of the season. Still, Horton was given the job permanently in May. He rejuvenated a demoralised side and kept them in the Football League, as they finished seven points clear of the relegation zone in 2003–04. Over the summer he signed Iraqi international Jassim Swadi, experienced striker Mike Sheron, veteran defender Tony Barras, left-back Mark Bailey, and Tommy Rooney. He allowed Martin Carruthers to leave, though extended Tommy Widdrington's contract, and offered fresh deals to six others. He later added to his squad by signing Mark Boyd and Simon Weaver; whilst transfer listing Tommy Widdrington and Michael Welch. Many pundits were tipping the "Silkmen" to slip out of the newly named League Two at the end of the 2004–05 season, but Horton proved the observers wrong as his side were in the top-seven of the division virtually all season long. Horton celebrated his 1000th game as a manager on 3 November 2004, as Macclesfield beat Mansfield 4–0 in the Football League Trophy. He also won the League Two Manager of the Month award for February. Macclesfield qualified for the play-offs in sixth place, but their promotion challenge was finally ended by Lincoln City in the semi-finals, following a 2–1 aggregate defeat. At the end of the season, Horton released nine players, including club captain Matthew Tipton. In the place of these nine players he signed Kevin Sandwith, Kevin Townson, Martin Bullock, and David Beresford.

Despite high expectations, Horton's men were not to challenge for promotion in the 2005–06 season. The club were hit by financial troubles after being told they had to pay fines totalling £250,000, and at one point were at risk of being wound up. As a result, Horton was forced to cope without assistant John Askey, after Askey was dismissed to cut costs. The sale of top-scorer Jon Parkin also robbed Horton of his best player. Following a poor start to the season he placed four players on the transfer list. He also placed Kevin Townson on the transfer-list, before sacking the striker after Townson displayed "serious misconduct". Throughout the campaign, Horton signed goalkeeper Tommy Lee, striker Clyde Wijnhard, midfielder Alan Navarro, forward Allan Russell, and striker Matty McNeil. The "Silkmen" finished in 17th-place, five points above the relegation zone. Horton prepared for the 2006–07 campaign by searching for a new midfield player, and found one in Shrewsbury Town's Jamie Tolley. He also signed versatile attacker Colin Heath, defender Carl Regan, and former Port Vale goalkeeper Jonny Brain; whilst releasing five players. Horton was sacked in October 2006, after his team failed to win any of their opening twelve league games, leaving them bottom of the Football League.

=== Assistant to Phil Brown ===
In May 2007, Horton returned to Hull City as assistant manager to Phil Brown; this appointment came 19 years after he resigned as Hull manager. His contacts were instrumental in bringing in Fraizer Campbell on loan from Manchester United, who would score 15 goals in 37 games for Hull. He helped the club win promotion to the Premier League via the play-offs in May 2008, the first time Hull City made it to the top-flight in their 104-year history. In March 2009, Horton was featured heavily in the press after accusing Arsenal club captain Cesc Fàbregas of spitting at him following an encounter in the FA Cup. Fàbregas was later cleared of any wrongdoing by the Football Association. Hull struggled in the 2009–10 season, and Phil Brown was put on gardening leave on 15 March, as Horton and Steve Parkin were appointed as the club's joint-caretaker managers. Horton offered to stay on until the end of the campaign but Hull instead appointed Iain Dowie, who was unable to avoid relegation.

In January 2011, Phil Brown was appointed manager of Preston North End, and Horton was appointed as his assistant. Preston were relegated from the Championship at the end of the 2010–11 campaign. Horton left Preston when Brown was dismissed on 14 December 2011.

=== Return to Macclesfield Town ===
In March 2012, following the departure of Gary Simpson, Horton returned to Macclesfield Town as manager for the rest of the 2011–12 season. Assisted by Glyn Chamberlain, he had been tasked with steering the club clear of relegation from League Two, much the same task as he faced the first time he was appointed manager. A 2–0 defeat to Burton Albion at Moss Rose on 28 April sent the "Silkmen" into the Conference after 15 years in the Football League. He stepped down as manager on 30 April, having gained just two points from his eight games in charge.

=== Later career ===
Horton turned down the chance of joining Phil Brown for a third time, now at Southend United. In June 2013, he was appointed as assistant manager to Paul Dickov at Championship club Doncaster Rovers. He left the role in July 2015. He was appointed as football coordinator at Southend United by Phil Brown in August 2015. He left Roots Hall on 17 January 2018 after Brown was placed on gardening leave. On 15 March 2018, Brown appointed Horton as his assistant at new club Swindon Town. However, Horton left the club just two months later, ending the pair's 11-year partnership in management.

== Personal life ==
He married Denise, a computer programmer, in the 1970s. They had twins: Matthew and Lucy. He married his second wife, Val, in October 2002. Before meeting Val he had released her son, Simon McMain, from the Manchester City youth team. Horton was diagnosed with prostate cancer and publicly revealed the news in October 2023 after being persuaded to do so by Mick Harford.

== Career statistics ==
=== Playing statistics ===
Appearances and goals by club, season and competition
Club	Season	League			FA Cup		Other^{[A]}		Total	
Club	Season	Division	Apps	Goals	Apps	Goals	Apps	Goals	Apps	Goals
Port Vale	1970–71	Third Division	39	1	1	0	0	0	40	1
Port Vale	1971–72	Third Division	42	5	4	3	1	0	47	8
Port Vale	1972–73	Third Division	39	6	2	1	2	0	43	7
Port Vale	1973–74	Third Division	41	4	4	0	1	0	46	4
Port Vale	1974–75	Third Division	44	13	2	0	1	0	47	13
Port Vale	1975–76	Third Division	31	4	3	0	1	0	35	4
Port Vale	Total		236	33	16	4	6	0	258	37
Brighton & Hove Albion	1975–76	Third Division	11	0	0	0	0	0	11	0
Brighton & Hove Albion	1976–77	Third Division	45	9	3	0	6	3	54	12
Brighton & Hove Albion	1977–78	Second Division	42	8	2	1	6	1	50	10
Brighton & Hove Albion	1978–79	Second Division	40	11	1	0	4	0	45	11
Brighton & Hove Albion	1979–80	First Division	42	4	1	2	5	1	48	7
Brighton & Hove Albion	1980–81	First Division	38	1	2	1	3	0	43	2
Brighton & Hove Albion	Total		218	33	9	4	24	5	251	42
Luton Town	1981–82	Second Division	41	1	2	1	2	0	45	2
Luton Town	1982–83	First Division	40	4	2	1	4	0	46	5
Luton Town	1983–84	First Division	37	3	2	0	2	0	41	3
Luton Town	Total		118	8	6	2	8	0	132	10
Hull City	1984–85	Third Division	22	0	2	0	3	0	27	0
Hull City	1985–86	Second Division	10	0	2	0	1	0	13	0
Hull City	1986–87	Second Division	6	0	0	0	1	0	7	0
Hull City	Total		38	0	4	0	5	0	47	0
Career total			610	74	35	10	43	5	688	89

A. The "Other" column constitutes appearances and goals in the League Cup, Football League Trophy, Football League play-offs and Full Members Cup.

=== Managerial statistics ===
Managerial record by team and tenure
Team	From	To	Record				
Team	From	To	P	W	D	L	Win %
Hull City	1 June 1984	13 April 1988	195	77	58	60	39.5
Oxford United	25 October 1988	27 August 1993	243	77	65	101	31.7
Manchester City	28 August 1993	16 May 1995	96	29	33	34	30.2
Huddersfield Town	21 June 1995	6 October 1997	120	39	35	46	32.5
Brighton & Hove Albion	26 February 1998	22 January 1999	43	14	10	19	32.6
Port Vale	22 January 1999	12 February 2004	262	84	67	111	32.1
Macclesfield Town	1 April 2004	1 October 2006	131	47	35	49	35.9
Macclesfield Town	19 March 2012	30 April 2012	8	0	2	6	0.0
Total			1,098	367	305	426	33.4

== Honours ==
=== As a player ===
Hednesford Town

- Staffordshire Senior Cup: 1970

Brighton & Hove Albion

- Football League Third Division second-place promotion: 1976–77
- Football League Second Division second-place promotion: 1978–79

Luton Town

- Football League Second Division: 1981–82

Individual

- PFA Team of the Year: 1976–77 Third Division, 1978–79 Second Division, 1981–82 Second Division
- Brighton & Hove Albion Player of the Year: 1976–77

=== As a manager ===
Hull City

- Football League Third Division third-place promotion: 1984–85

Port Vale

- Football League Trophy: 2000–01

Individual

- Football League Second Division Manager of the Month: March 2001, February 2002, August 2003
- Football League Two Manager of the Month: February 2005

== See also ==
- List of football managers with the most matches
