= Sammy Stevens =

English footballer

Personal information
- Full name: Samuel Stevens
- Date of birth: 18 November 1890
- Place of birth: Netherton, England
- Height: 5 ft 8 1/2 in (1.74 m)
- Position: Striker

Senior career*
Years	Team	Apps	(Gls)
?–1911	Cradley Heath St Luke's	?	(?)
1911–1920	Hull City	150	(84)
1920	Notts County	22	(9)
1920–1922	Coventry City	59	(25)
1922–?	Dudley Bean	?	(?)
Total		231	(118)
- * Club domestic league appearances and goals

Samuel Stevens (born 18 November 1890, date of death unknown) was an English footballer who played for Hull City, Notts County and Coventry City in the Football League.
