= Syd Gerrie =

Scottish footballer

Personal information
- Full name: Sydney Gerrie
- Date of birth: 14 June 1927
- Place of birth: Aberdeen, Scotland
- Date of death: 9 May 2005 (aged 77)
- Place of death: Inverurie, Aberdeenshire, Scotland
- Position: Striker

Senior career*
Years	Team	Apps	(Gls)
?–1948	Inverurie Locos	?	(?)
1948–1950	Dundee	41	(20)
1950–1957	Hull City	146	(59)
Total		187	(79)
- * Club domestic league appearances and goals

Sydney Gerrie (14 June 1927 – 9 May 2005) was a Scottish footballer, who played for Dundee and Hull City.
