= Andy Flounders =

English footballer

Personal information
- Full name: Andrew John Flounders
- Date of birth: 13 December 1963
- Place of birth: Kingston upon Hull, England
- Position: Striker

Senior career*
| Years | Team | Apps | (Gls) |
| 1981–1987 | Hull City | 126 | (54) |
| 1987–1991 | Scunthorpe United | 186 | (87) |
| 1991–1993 | Rochdale | 82 | (31) |
| 1993 | → Rotherham United (loan) | 6 | (2) |
| 1993 | → Carlisle United (loan) | 5 | (1) |
| 1994 | → Carlisle United (loan) | 1 | (0) |
| 1994 | Halifax Town | 0 | (0) |
| 1994 | Northampton Town | 2 | (0) |
| 1995 | Guangdong Winnerway | 0 | (0) |
| 1995-96 | Brigg Town | 0 | (0) |
| 1996-2001 | North Ferriby United | 0 | (0) |
| Total | | 408 | (175) |
- * Club domestic league appearances and goals

Andrew John Flounders (born 13 December 1963) is an English former professional footballer who played as a striker in the Football League for Hull City, Scunthorpe United, Rochdale and Northampton Town, also seeing loan spells at Rotherham United and Carlisle United.

== Career ==
Flounders began his career with his local club Hull City and was a regular presence in the side managed by Brian Horton that won promotion to the Third Division in 1983 and to the Second Division in 1985.

He joined Scunthorpe United during the 1986–87 season and continued his prolific scoring form, which was maintained when he joined Rochdale for a fee of £80,000 after rejecting a contract extension at Scunthorpe in 1991. Loan spells at Rotherham United and Carlisle United and a brief stay at Northampton Town and Guangdong Hongyuan (between March and April 1995) followed before he joined Brigg Town, playing in the FA Vase final for the club in 1996 and finally North Ferriby United, for whom he scored over 150 goals

== Honours ==
Hull City

- Associate Members' Cup runner-up: 1983–84
