= Richard Lowe (footballer) =

English footballer

Personal information
- Full name: Richard Ernest Lowe
- Date of birth: 13 July 1915
- Place of birth: Cannock, England
- Date of death: 1986
- Position: Striker

Senior career*
Years	Team	Apps	(Gls)
1936	Leeds United	0	(0)
1937	Sheffield United	1	(0)
1939	Hull City	0	(0)
Total		1	(0)
- * Club domestic league appearances and goals

Richard Ernest Lowe (13 July 1915 – 1986) was an English footballer who played for Sheffield United and Hull City in the Football League. He had a wife (Vera) and three daughters and one son (Linda, Val, Sandra and Richard).
