= Benny Lester =

English footballer (1920–1958)

Personal information
- Full name: Abraham Bennett Lester
- Date of birth: 10 February 1920
- Place of birth: Sheffield, England
- Date of death: 1958
- Position: Striker

Senior career*
| Years | Team | Apps | (Gls) |
| ?–1946 | Selby Town | ? | (?) |
| 1946–1948 | Hull City | 27 | (17) |
| 1948–? | Lincoln City | 37 | (10) |
| ?–1949 | Ransome & Marles | ? | (?) |
| 1949–1950 | Stockport County | 8 | (2) |
| Total | | 72 | (29) |
- * Club domestic league appearances and goals

Abraham Bennett "Benny" Lester (10 February 1920 – 1958) was an English footballer who played for Hull City, Lincoln City and Stockport County in the Football League.
