= 1986–87 Football League Cup =

League Cup, Littlewoods Challenge Cup

Tournament details
- Country: England; Wales
- Teams: 92

Final positions
- Champions: Arsenal (1st title)
- Runners-up: Liverpool

Tournament statistics
- Top goal scorer: Clive Allen (12)

The 1986–87 Football League Cup (known as the Littlewoods Challenge Cup for sponsorship reasons) was the 27th season of the Football League Cup, a knockout competition for England's top 92 football clubs.

The competition began on 25 August 1986, and ended with the final on 5 April 1987. The final was played between Arsenal and Liverpool. The match, played in front of 96,000 spectators at Wembley Stadium, was won by Arsenal 2–1.

Luton Town were thrown out of the competition when they refused to allow Cardiff City fans to attend the match at Kenilworth Road. This was at the moment when club's then chairman, Conservative MP David Evans, tried to introduce a scheme effective from the start of 1986–87 banning all visiting supporters from the ground, and requiring home fans to carry identity cards when attending matches.

== First round ==
=== First leg ===
Home team	Score	Away team	Date
Aldershot	1–3	Fulham	26 August 1986
Blackpool	0–0	Preston North End	26 August 1986
Bournemouth	0–1	Bristol City	26 August 1986
Bristol Rovers	1–2	Reading	27 August 1986
Bury	2–1	Bolton Wanderers	26 August 1986
Cardiff City	5–4	Plymouth Argyle	26 August 1986
Carlisle United	1–0	Grimsby Town	2 September 1986
Chesterfield	0–2	Wrexham	26 August 1986
Colchester United	0–0	Peterborough United	26 August 1986
Derby County	0–1	Chester City	27 August 1986
Doncaster Rovers	1–1	Rotherham United	26 August 1986
Exeter City	0–0	Newport County	27 August 1986
Gillingham	1–0	Northampton Town	25 August 1986
Hartlepool United	1–1	Middlesbrough	26 August 1986
Hereford United	3–3	Swansea City	27 August 1986
Huddersfield Town	3–1	Halifax Town	26 August 1986
Orient	2–2	Cambridge United	26 August 1986
Notts County	1–3	Port Vale	26 August 1986
Rochdale	1–1	Burnley	26 August 1986
Scunthorpe United	2–0	Darlington	26 August 1986
Shrewsbury Town	0–0	Crewe Alexandra	26 August 1986
Southend United	1–0	Brentford	26 August 1986
Stockport County	2–1	Tranmere Rovers	26 August 1986
Sunderland	2–4	York City	26 August 1986
Swindon Town	3–0	Torquay United	26 August 1986
Walsall	1–0	Mansfield Town	26 August 1986
Wigan Athletic	1–3	Blackburn Rovers	26 August 1986
Wolverhampton Wanderers	1–2	Lincoln City	26 August 1986

=== Second leg ===
Home team	Score	Away team	Date	Agg
Blackburn Rovers	2–0	Wigan Athletic	2 September 1986	5–1
Bolton Wanderers	0–0	Bury	2 September 1986	1–2
Brentford	2–3	Southend United	2 September 1986	2–4
Bristol City	1–1	Bournemouth	2 September 1986	2–1
Burnley	1–3	Rochdale	2 September 1986	2–4
Cambridge United	1–0	Orient	2 September 1986	3–2
Chester City	1–2	Derby County	3 September 1986	2–2
Crewe Alexandra	0–4	Shrewsbury Town	2 September 1986	0–4
Darlington	1–2	Scunthorpe United	2 September 1986	1–4
Fulham	2–0	Aldershot	3 September 1986	5–1
Grimsby Town	2–0	Carlisle United	9 September 1986	2–1
Halifax Town	2–2	Huddersfield Town	2 September 1986	3–5
Lincoln City	0–1	Wolverhampton Wanderers	2 September 1986	2–2
Mansfield Town	2–4	Walsall	2 September 1986	2–5
Middlesbrough	2–0	Hartlepool United	2 September 1986	3–1
Newport County	1–0	Exeter City	2 September 1986	1–0
Northampton Town	2–2	Gillingham	3 September 1986	2–3
Peterborough United	2–0	Colchester United	3 September 1986	2–0
Plymouth Argyle	0–1	Cardiff City	2 September 1986	4–6
Port Vale	4–1	Notts County	3 September 1986	7–2
Preston North End	2–1	Blackpool	2 September 1986	2–1
Reading	4–0	Bristol Rovers	3 September 1986	6–1
Rotherham United	4–1	Doncaster Rovers	2 September 1986	5–2
Swansea City	5–1	Hereford United	2 September 1986	8–4
Torquay United	2–3	Swindon Town	2 September 1986	2–6
Tranmere Rovers	3–3	Stockport County	2 September 1986	4–5
Wrexham	2–2	Chesterfield	2 September 1986	4–2
York City	1–3	Sunderland	2 September 1986	5–5

== Second round ==
=== First leg ===
Home team	Score	Away team	Date
Arsenal	2–0	Huddersfield Town	23 September 1986
Barnsley	2–3	Tottenham Hotspur	23 September 1986
Bradford City	2–0	Newcastle United	23 September 1986
Brighton & Hove Albion	0–0	Nottingham Forest	24 September 1986
Bristol City	2–2	Sheffield United	23 September 1986
Cambridge United	1–1	Wimbledon	23 September 1986
Charlton Athletic	3–1	Lincoln City	23 September 1986
Coventry City	3–2	Rotherham United	23 September 1986
Crystal Palace	0–0	Bury	24 September 1986
Derby County	4–1	West Bromwich Albion	24 September 1986
Everton	4–0	Newport County	24 September 1986
Hull City	1–0	Grimsby Town	23 September 1986
Liverpool	10–0	Fulham	23 September 1986
Manchester United	2–0	Port Vale	24 September 1986
Middlesbrough	2–2	Birmingham City	23 September 1986
Oldham Athletic	3–2	Leeds United	23 September 1986
Oxford United	6–0	Gillingham	24 September 1986
Peterborough United	0–0	Norwich City	24 September 1986
Preston North End	1–1	West Ham United	23 September 1986
Queens Park Rangers	2–1	Blackburn Rovers	23 September 1986
Reading	1–1	Aston Villa	24 September 1986
Scunthorpe United	1–2	Ipswich Town	23 September 1986
Sheffield Wednesday	3–0	Stockport County	23 September 1986
Shrewsbury Town	2–1	Stoke City	23 September 1986
Southampton	3–0	Swindon Town	23 September 1986
Southend United	0–0	Manchester City	23 September 1986
Swansea City	0–2	Leicester City	23 September 1986
Walsall	0–1	Millwall	7 October 1986
Watford	1–1	Rochdale	23 September 1986
Wrexham	1–2	Portsmouth	24 September 1986
York City	1–0	Chelsea	23 September 1986

=== Second leg ===
Home team	Score	Away team	Date	Agg
Aston Villa	4–1	Reading	8 October 1986	5–2
Birmingham City	3–2	Middlesbrough	7 October 1986	5–4
Blackburn Rovers	2–2	Queens Park Rangers	7 October 1986	3–4
Bury	0–1	Crystal Palace	7 October 1986	0–1
Chelsea	3–0	York City	8 October 1986	3–1
Fulham	2–3	Liverpool	7 October 1986	2–13
Gillingham	1–1	Oxford United	7 October 1986	1–7
Grimsby Town	1–1	Hull City	7 October 1986	1–2
Huddersfield Town	1–1	Arsenal	7 October 1986	1–3
Ipswich Town	2–0	Scunthorpe United	7 October 1986	4–1
Leeds United	0–1	Oldham Athletic	8 October 1986	2–4
Leicester City	4–2	Swansea City	8 October 1986	6–2
Lincoln City	0–1	Charlton Athletic	8 October 1986	1–4
Manchester City	2–1	Southend United	8 October 1986	2–1
Millwall	3–2	Walsall	14 October 1986	4–2
Newcastle United	1–0	Bradford City	8 October 1986	1–2
Newport County	1–5	Everton	7 October 1986	1–9
Norwich City	1–0	Peterborough United	8 October 1986	1–0
Nottingham Forest	3–0	Brighton & Hove Albion	8 October 1986	3–0
Port Vale	2–5	Manchester United	7 October 1986	2–7
Portsmouth	2–0	Wrexham	7 October 1986	4–1
Rochdale	1–2	Watford	7 October 1986	2–3
Rotherham United	0–1	Coventry City	7 October 1986	2–4
Sheffield United	3–0	Bristol City	7 October 1986	5–2
Stockport County	0–7	Sheffield Wednesday	6 October 1986	0–10
Stoke City	0–0	Shrewsbury Town	8 October 1986	1–2
Swindon Town	0–0	Southampton	8 October 1986	0–3
Tottenham Hotspur	5–3	Barnsley	8 October 1986	8–5
West Bromwich Albion	0–1	Derby County	7 October 1986	1–5
West Ham United	4–1	Preston North End	7 October 1986	5–2
Wimbledon	2–2	Cambridge United	7 October 1986	3–3

=== Luton Town v Cardiff City ===
Luton Town were thrown out of the competition when they refused to allow Cardiff City fans to attend the match at Kenilworth Road.

This allowed Cardiff a bye into the Third Round.

== Last 32 ==
=== Ties ===
Home team	Score	Away team	Date
Arsenal	3–1	Manchester City	28 October 1986
Bradford City	3–1	Portsmouth	29 October 1986
Cambridge United	1–0	Ipswich Town	28 October 1986
Cardiff City	2–1	Chelsea	28 October 1986
Charlton Athletic	1–0	Queens Park Rangers	28 October 1986
Coventry City	2–1	Oldham Athletic	28 October 1986
Crystal Palace	2–2	Nottingham Forest	29 October 1986
Derby County	1–1	Aston Villa	29 October 1986
Everton	4–0	Sheffield Wednesday	28 October 1986
Liverpool	4–1	Leicester City	29 October 1986
Manchester United	0–0	Southampton	29 October 1986
Norwich City	4–1	Millwall	29 October 1986
Oxford United	3–1	Sheffield United	29 October 1986
Shrewsbury Town	1–0	Hull City	28 October 1986
Tottenham Hotspur	5–0	Birmingham City	29 October 1986
Watford	2–3	West Ham United	29 October 1986

=== Replays ===
Home team	Score	Away team	Date
Aston Villa	2–1	Derby County	4 November 1986
Nottingham Forest	1–0	Crystal Palace	5 November 1986
Southampton	4–1	Manchester United	4 November 1986

== Last 16 ==
=== Ties ===
Home team	Score	Away team	Date
Arsenal	2–0	Charlton Athletic	18 November 1986
Bradford City	0–5	Nottingham Forest	19 November 1986
Cambridge United	1–3	Tottenham Hotspur	26 November 1986
Coventry City	0–0	Liverpool	19 November 1986
Norwich City	1–4	Everton	19 November 1986
Shrewsbury Town	1–0	Cardiff City	18 November 1986
Southampton	2–1	Aston Villa	18 November 1986
West Ham United	1–0	Oxford United	18 November 1986

=== Replay ===
Home team	Score	Away team	Date
Liverpool	3–1	Coventry City	26 November 1986

== Quarter-finals ==
=== Ties ===
Home team	Score	Away team	Date
Arsenal	2–0	Nottingham Forest	21 January 1987
Everton	0–1	Liverpool	21 January 1987
Southampton	1–0	Shrewsbury Town	27 January 1987
West Ham United	1–1	Tottenham Hotspur	27 January 1987

=== Replay ===
Home team	Score	Away team	Date
Tottenham Hotspur	5–0	West Ham United	2 February 1987

== Semi-finals ==
North London rivals Arsenal and Tottenham Hotspur were both in the league title race this season and the League Cup semi-final paired them together, where the scores were equal over two legs before Arsenal won the replay. Liverpool, four-time winners earlier in the decade, were held to a 0–0 draw at Southampton in the first leg of the other semi-final before triumphing 3–0 at Anfield.

=== First leg ===
Home team	Score	Away team	Date
Arsenal	0–1	Tottenham Hotspur	8 February 1987
Southampton	0–0	Liverpool	11 February 1987

=== Second leg ===
Home team	Score	Away team	Date	Agg
Liverpool	3–0	Southampton	25 February 1987	3–0
Tottenham Hotspur	1–2	Arsenal	1 March 1987	2–2

=== Replay ===
Home team	Score	Away team	Date
Tottenham Hotspur	1–2	Arsenal	4 March 1987

== Final ==
=== Match details ===
5 April 1987
15:15 BST

Arsenal	2–1	Liverpool
Nicholas 30', 83'		Rush 23'

Wembley Stadium, London
Attendance: 96,000
Referee: Lester Shapter (Devon)
