= Bobby Doyle (Scottish footballer) =

Scottish footballer (1953–2019)

Personal information
- Full name: Robert Doyle
- Date of birth: 27 December 1953
- Place of birth: Dumbarton, Scotland
- Date of death: 26 February 2019 (aged 65)
- Place of death: Peterborough, England
- Height: 5 ft 11 in (1.80 m)
- Position: Midfielder

Senior career*
Years	Team	Apps	(Gls)
1972–1976	Barnsley	149	(16)
1976–1979	Peterborough United	130	(10)
1979–1980	Blackpool	49	(2)
1980–1985	Portsmouth	177	(16)
1985–1987	Hull City	43	(2)
Total		548	(46)
- * Club domestic league appearances and goals

Robert Doyle (27 December 1953 – 26 February 2019) was a Scottish professional footballer who played as a central midfielder.

== Early life ==
Doyle was born in Dumbarton in 1953.

== Career ==
Having previously played in Scottish junior football, Doyle signed for English side Barnsley in December 1972. After winning Barnsley's Player of the Year award and being named in the PFA's Fourth Division team of the season for the 1974–75 season, he signed for Peterborough United in July 1976 for a fee of £20,000. He moved to Blackpool in 1979 for a fee of £110,000, making 49 league appearances and scoring two goals, before joining Portsmouth in December 1980 for a £75,000 fee, winning the Third Division championship in 1983. A move to Hull City followed two years later where he established himself in midfield during the club's promotion bid in 1985–86, before a broken leg in a pre-season friendly against Doncaster Rovers in July 1986 effectively ended his career, with Doyle retiring in 1987.

== Later life ==
Following his retirement, Doyle settled in Peterborough and lived and worked there up until his death. He died on 26 February 2019, at the age of 65.

== Honours ==
Portsmouth

- Football League Third Division: 1982–83
