= Ray Daniel (English footballer) =

English footballer (born 1964)

Personal information
- Full name: Raymond Christopher Daniel
- Date of birth: 10 December 1964 (age 61)
- Place of birth: Luton, England
- Height: 5 ft 10 in (1.78 m)
- Position: Defender

Youth career
- 1982–1986: Luton Town

Senior career*
Years	Team	Apps	(Gls)
1982–1986	Luton Town	22	(4)
1983	→ Gillingham (loan)	5	(0)
1986–1989	Hull City	58	(3)
1989–1990	Cardiff City	56	(1)
1990–1995	Portsmouth	100	(4)
1994	→ Notts County (loan)	5	(0)
1995–1997	Walsall	35	(0)
- * Club domestic league appearances and goals as of 09:53, 25 April 2010 (UTC) ‡ National team caps and goals as of 00:06, 9 September 2009 (UTC)

Raymond Christopher Daniel (born 10 December 1964) is an English former professional footballer. Born in Luton, he began his career with his hometown club Luton Town and later played for Gillingham, Hull City, Cardiff City, Portsmouth, Notts County and Walsall. He made over 250 appearances in The Football League between 1982 and 1997. He helped Portsmouth to the 1992 FA Cup semi final, but they lost in a penalty shoot-out to Liverpool.
