= Les Thompson (footballer, born 1968) =

English footballer

Personal information
- Full name: Leslie Allen Thompson
- Date of birth: 23 September 1968 (age 58)
- Place of birth: Cleethorpes, England
- Position: Left back

Senior career*
Years	Team	Apps	(Gls)
1987–1991	Hull City	35	(4)
1988	→ Scarborough (loan)	3	(1)
1991–1992	Maidstone United	38	(0)
1992–1994	Burnley	39	(0)
Total		115	(5)
- * Club domestic league appearances and goals

Leslie Allen "Les" Thompson (born 23 September 1968) is an English former professional footballer who played as a left back.

== Career ==
Born in Cleethorpes, Lincolnshire, Thompson started his career with Hull City, where he signed professional terms in 1987. He played 35 matches in four seasons with Hull, he famously clattered legendary Manchester United player Bryan Robson in a League Cup game and in December 1988 he was sent out on loan to Scarborough, where he played three games and scored one goal. In 1991, he moved to Football League Fourth Division side Maidstone United. He spent only one season with Maidstone, playing 38 times as the side struggled in the league, eventually resigning from it at the end of the 1991–92 campaign. His performances for the club had attracted bigger teams, and in the summer of 1992 he was signed by newly promoted Second Division side Burnley. In two seasons with the Clarets, he played 39 league games, but at the end of the 1993–94 season he was released and moved into non-league football. In November 1999, he signed for North West Counties Football League side Nelson, having previously been at Clitheroe.

== Honours ==
Burnley

- Football League Second Division play-offs: 1994
