= Neil Buckley =

English former professional footballer who played as a defender

Personal information
- Full name: Neil Buckley
- Date of birth: 25 September 1968 (age 58)
- Place of birth: Hull, England
- Position: Defender

Senior career*
Years	Team	Apps	(Gls)
1986–1992	Hull City	60	(3)
1990	→ Burnley (loan)	5	(0)
1992–1996	Brigg Town	?	(?)
Total		65	(3)

Managerial career
- 2003–2008: Barton Town Old Boys
- * Club domestic league appearances and goals

Neil Buckley (born 25 September 1968) is an English former professional footballer who played as a defender. He began his career with Hull City, where he spent six seasons in the first team. During the 1989–90 season he had a spell on loan with Lancashire-based club Burnley. After leaving Hull in 1992, Buckley moved into non-League football, assisting Brigg Town, where he won the FA Vase in 1996, and North Ferriby United. Between 2003 and 2008 he was manager of Barton Town Old Boys.

== Career ==
Buckley started his career at his hometown club Hull City, where he came through the youth ranks before making his first-team debut in January 1987 in a Second Division fixture against Plymouth Argyle. After missing the 1987–88 season, he made 23 league appearances for Hull over the following two campaigns before joining Fourth Division side Burnley on a short-term loan in March 1990. He was handed his debut by Burnley manager Frank Casper for the match away at Peterborough United. It was an inauspicious start for Buckley as the team lost 1–4, with one of the opposition's goals coming from a penalty kick that he conceded. He made four further appearances for the Turf Moor club before returning to Hull at the end of the 1989–90 season.

During the 1990–91 season Buckley established himself as a regular starter in the Hull side, scoring twice in 31 league matches. However, the season was ultimately unsuccessful for the club as they finished bottom of the Second Division and were relegated to the third tier of English football for the first time in six years. Buckley played just five times the following season before being released by Hull in the summer of 1992. He subsequently moved into non-League football with Brigg Town, where he remained for several years. In May 1996 he was part of the Brigg side that won the FA Vase, beating Clitheroe 3–0 in the final at Wembley Stadium. He later had a spell with North Ferriby United.

Buckley later moved into football management, joining Barton Town Old Boys in 2003. He led the team to a Central Midlands League championship in 2005–06 and earned promotion to the Northern Counties East League before resigning as manager in July 2008 due to other work commitments.

== Football League statistics ==
Club	Season	Division	Apps	Goals
Hull City	1986–87	Second Division	1	0
Hull City	1987–88	Second Division	0	0
Hull City	1988–89	Second Division	13	0
Hull City	1989–90	Second Division	10	1
Burnley (loan)	1989–90	Fourth Division	5	0
Hull City	1990–91	Second Division	31	2
Hull City	1991–92	Third Division	5	0
Career totals			65	3

== Honours ==
Brigg Town

- FA Vase: 1996

Barton Town Old Boys

- Central Midlands League champions: 2005–06
