= Garreth Roberts =

English footballer

Personal information
- Date of birth: 15 November 1960 (age 65)
- Place of birth: Hull, England
- Height: 5 ft 6 in (1.68 m)
- Position: Midfielder

Senior career*
Years	Team	Apps	(Gls)
1978–1991	Hull City	409	(47)
- * Club domestic league appearances and goals

Garreth Roberts (born 15 November 1960) is an English retired professional footballer who spent his whole career with hometown club Hull City, including captaining them to two promotions.

== Education ==
Roberts was educated at Wolfreton School.

== Career ==
Roberts made his debut against Bury in March 1979, coming on as a substitute for the injured Alan Warboys. He was made Captain of the team in his early twenties. He played primarily in midfield, although in the later stages of his career he was also deployed in defence as a full-back or sweeper.

Roberts was forced to retire from professional football at the age of 31 due to injuries. His testimonial match saw Hull-born Nick Barmby make his debut for Tottenham Hotspur and score two goals against his hometown club.

Roberts was voted 17th in a list of the top 100 Hull City players compiled for the club's centenary. On 31 December 2021, Roberts was inducted into the Hull City Hall of Fame.

== Honours ==
Hull City

- Associate Members' Cup runner-up: 1983–84

== See also ==
- One-club man
