= Mancot =

Village in Flintshire, Wales

Coordinates: 53.191°N 3.011°W

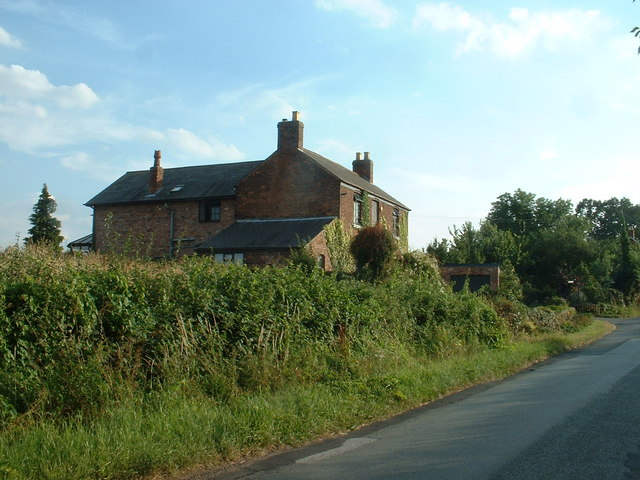
- House on Moor Lane, Mancot

- Location within Flintshire
- Population: 3,496 (2011 CensusWard)
- OS grid reference: SJ325665
- Principal area: Flintshire
- Preserved county: Clwyd
- Country: Wales
- Sovereign state: United Kingdom
- Post town: DEESIDE
- Postcode district: CH5
- Dialling code: 01244
- Police: North Wales
- Fire: North Wales
- Ambulance: Welsh
- UK Parliament: Alyn and Deeside
- Senedd Cymru – Welsh Parliament: Alyn and Deeside

Mancot is a village in Flintshire, Wales, approximately 1 mile from Queensferry, and Hawarden and 6 miles from Chester. According to the 2001 Census, Mancot had a population of 3,462. In 1849 the population of the village was 282.

Following reorganisation the population of Mancot was listed under Hawarden. The electoral ward remains giving a population taken at the 2011 Census of 3,496.

The placename Mancot is believed to mean 'humble dwelling', with the earliest recorded reference to the village being in the late 13th century.

Although now considered a village in its own right, Mancot was originally divided into three small hamlets consisting of Little Mancot, Big Mancot and Mancot Royal. Though these areas historically do not exist, they still are a feature on OS maps and the meteorological office databank

Mancot was earlier spelled with a double "tt" ending - Mancott.

Village amenities include an Animal farm park, village hall, park and playing fields, bowling green, library, a newsagent, a veterinary clinic, a Presbyterian church, Sandycroft County Primary School and the White Bear public house. The post office is now closed and has been converted into a private dwelling. Mancot was also home to a Conservative club and later on a social club. The club itself was originally a peanut factory located in Hawarden way opposite a once thriving fish and chip shop known later on as "Fred's". During the second world war the club became a munitions factory producing bullets for the nearby RAF camp in Sealand. After the war it became a Conservative Club and a place for many Mancot villagers to socialise. It was well known for its snooker tables and cabaret nights. Both the club and fish shop were demolished for housing.

The village is situated close to the Wales-England border.

Archaeological work ahead of a housing development on Gladstone Way uncovered a Roman settlement beneath the village, including evidence of a jewellery workshop. Finds included pottery, coins, brooches and lead moulds. Two of the coins depicted the emperors Commodus and Constantine.

Notable people born in the village include the late football player and Wales manager Gary Speed, who was born there in 1969, fellow former Everton captain Kevin Ratcliffe and former Sunderland goalkeeper Tony Norman.
