= Billy Whitehurst =

English footballer

Personal information
- Full name: William Whitehurst
- Date of birth: 10 June 1959 (age 67)
- Place of birth: Thurnscoe, West Riding of Yorkshire, England
- Height: 6 ft 0 in (1.83 m)
- Position: Striker

Senior career*
Years	Team	Apps	(Gls)
1977–1978	Retford Town		
1978–1980	Bridlington Trinity	?	(?)
1980	Mexborough Town Athletic	?	(?)
1980–1985	Hull City	193	(47)
1985–1986	Newcastle United	28	(7)
1986–1988	Oxford United	40	(4)
1988	Reading	17	(8)
1988	Sunderland	17	(3)
1988–1990	Hull City	36	(5)
1990–1991	Sheffield United	22	(2)
1990	→ Stoke City (loan)	3	(0)
1991–1992	Doncaster Rovers	22	(1)
1992	→ Crewe Alexandra (loan)	10	(0)
1992	St George Budapest	11	(4)
1992	Hatfield Main	?	(?)
1992	Kettering Town	4	(0)
1992	Goole Town	?	(?)
1992	Stafford Rangers	2	(0)
1992	Mossley	2	(0)
1993	Glentoran	6	(4)
1993	South China	4	(1)
1993–1994	Voicelink	?	(?)
1994–1995	Frickley Athletic	?	(?)
Total		417+	(86+)
- * Club domestic league appearances and goals

William Whitehurst (born 10 June 1959) is an English retired professional footballer active during the 1980s and 1990s. Whitehurst's aggressive, intimidating, violent style of play attracted much notoriety in his journeyman career.

== Career ==
Whitehurst was born in Thurnscoe, West Riding of Yorkshire and started his career playing for a number of semi-professional teams in South Yorkshire, Retford Town, Bridlington Trinity and Mexborough Town, whilst also working for the local council as a bricklayer. He eventually made the move into the professional ranks with Hull City in 1980 signing for a £2,000 fee. He initially struggled with the demands of the professional game but eventually sealed his place as one of the most popular players to have ever played for the club. He helped the Tigers win promotion in 1982–83 and 1984–85 with Whitehurst scoring a career best of 24 goals.

He joined Newcastle United in 1985 as their then record signing for £232,000. Despite playing in a side containing Peter Beardsley and Paul Gascoigne, the move did not work out and Whitehurst failed to score in his first 11 appearances for the club. A spat with his own supporters signalled the end of his career on Tyneside and after playing only 28 league games he was transferred to Oxford United in 1986. However the move there was similarly short-lived, and Whitehurst left after a clash with assistant manager Ray Graydon.

Whitehurst then joined Reading in February 1988 scoring eight goals in 19 matches for the Royals he left for Sunderland scoring three in 18 matches before making a return to Hull City. Whitehurst spent a year and a half back at Boothferry Park before joining Sheffield United. Whitehurst helped the Blades gain promotion in 1989–90 and spent a short time out on loan at Stoke City in 1990–91 where he played in five matches. Whitehurst ended his professional career at Doncaster Rovers during which time he also played on loan for Crewe Alexandra.

Whitehurst ended his playing days abroad, playing in Northern Ireland, Australia and in Hong Kong with South China (1992–93) before a long-standing knee injury caused his retirement in 1993.

== Personal life and post-retirement ==
He supported Manchester United as a child and George Best was his favourite player. Whitehurst told Shoot magazine in the 1980s that Keith Mincher and Chris Chilton had the greatest influences on his career and said that Mincher made him believe in himself while Chilton had taught him positions to take up in the box. Whitehurst cited Spitting Image and Taxi as his favourite shows and Bruce Springsteen and Nat King Cole as his favourite musicians.

In the 1980s Whitehurst was married with two children.

Since retiring from football Whitehurst has trained greyhounds, run several public houses in South Yorkshire and worked in the building trade and in the stores at BP Saltend and Drax Power Station. In 2008, he was found guilty of benefit fraud and given a suspended prison sentence.

== Career statistics ==
Appearances and goals by club, season and competition
Club	Season	League			FA Cup		League Cup		Other (Note: Includes Football League Group Cup, Football League Trophy, Full Members Cup.)		Total	
Club	Season	Division	Apps	Goals	Apps	Goals	Apps	Goals	Apps	Goals	Apps	Goals
Hull City	1980–81	Third Division	26	1	0	0	0	0	0	0	26	1
Hull City	1981–82	Fourth Division	36	6	5	2	2	0	3	1	46	9
Hull City	1982–83	Fourth Division	36	3	2	0	2	1	3	1	43	5
Hull City	1983–84	Third Division	37	10	2	1	2	0	5	0	46	11
Hull City	1984–85	Third Division	40	20	1	0	3	3	2	1	46	24
Hull City	1985–86	Second Division	18	7	1	0	3	2	3	3	25	12
Hull City	Total		193	47	11	3	12	6	16	6	232	62
Newcastle United	1985–86	First Division	20	7	1	0	0	0	0	0	28	7
Newcastle United	1986–87	First Division	8	0	0	0	2	0	0	0	10	0
Newcastle United	Total		28	7	1	0	2	0	0	0	38	7
Oxford United	1986–87	First Division	20	2	1	0	0	0	1	2	22	4
Oxford United	1987–88	First Division	20	2	1	0	5	0	1	0	27	2
Oxford United	Total		40	4	2	0	5	0	2	2	49	6
Reading	1987–88	Second Division	15	6	0	0	0	0	0	0	15	6
Reading	1988–89	Third Division	2	2	0	0	2	0	0	0	4	2
Reading	Total		17	8	0	0	2	0	0	0	19	8
Sunderland	1988–89	Second Division	17	3	0	0	0	0	1	0	18	3
Hull City	1988–89	Second Division	21	5	3	2	0	0	0	0	24	7
Hull City	1989–90	Second Division	15	0	1	0	0	0	0	0	16	0
Hull City	Total		36	5	4	2	0	0	0	0	40	7
Sheffield United	1989–90	Second Division	14	2	0	0	0	0	0	0	14	2
Sheffield United	1990–91	First Division	8	0	0	0	0	0	1	0	9	0
Sheffield United	Total		22	2	0	0	0	0	1	0	23	2
Stoke City (loan)	1990–91	Third Division	3	0	2	0	0	0	0	0	5	0
Doncaster Rovers	1990–91	Fourth Division	13	1	0	0	0	0	0	0	13	1
Doncaster Rovers	1991–92	Fourth Division	9	0	2	1	2	2	0	0	13	3
Doncaster Rovers	Total		22	1	2	1	2	2	0	0	26	4
Crewe Alexandra	1991–92	Fourth Division	10	0	0	0	0	0	1	0	11	0
Career total			388	77	22	6	23	8	21	8	454	99

== Honours ==
Hull City

- Football League Fourth Division runner-up: 1982–83
- Football League Third Division third-place promotion: 1984–85
- Associate Members' Cup runner-up: 1983–84

Sheffield United

- Football League Second Division runner-up: 1989–90
