= Peter Skipper =

English footballer (1958–2019)

Personal information
- Full name: Peter Dennis Skipper
- Date of birth: 11 April 1958
- Place of birth: Hull, England
- Date of death: 23 April 2019 (aged 61)
- Height: 5 ft 11 in (1.80 m)
- Position: Defender

Youth career
- Greenwood
- Schultz Youth Club

Senior career*
Years	Team	Apps	(Gls)
1979–1980	Hull City	23	(2)
1980	→ Scunthorpe United (loan)	1	(0)
1980–1982	Darlington	91	(4)
1982–1988	Hull City	265	(17)
1988–1989	Oldham Athletic	27	(1)
1989–1991	Walsall	81	(2)
1991–1992	Wrexham	2	(0)
1992	Wigan Athletic	18	(0)
1992	Stafford Rangers	?	(?)
1992–1994	Wigan Athletic	73	(4)
Total		581	(30)
- * Club domestic league appearances and goals

Peter Dennis Skipper (11 April 1958 – 23 April 2019) was an English footballer who played as a central defender.

Skipper originally started out as a goalkeeper before becoming a midfielder and finally a central defender. He turned professional when he signed for Hull City in January 1979 but often was played at left back. He then had spells at Scunthorpe United and Darlington before returning to Hull in August 1982. In the 1982-83 season, he won promotion with Hull from the Fourth Division and the following year was on the losing side in the Associate Members' Cup final. He made over 300 appearances for the club, scoring 19 goals, including the winning header against Walsall which clinched Hull's promotion to the Second Division in 1985. He moved to Oldham Athletic in 1988, and went to play for Walsall and Wrexham before finishing his career at Wigan Athletic.

Employed at Hull's then KCOM Stadium as corporate host on match days, Skipper died of complications caused by a stroke on 23 April 2019, at the age of 61.

== Honours ==
Hull City

- Associate Members' Cup runner-up: 1983–84
