= Gavin Kelly =

English footballer

Personal information
- Date of birth: 29 September 1968 (age 58)
- Place of birth: Beverley, England
- Position: Goalkeeper

Youth career
- Hull City

Senior career*
Years	Team	Apps	(Gls)
1987–1990	Hull City	11	(0)
1990–1994	Bristol Rovers	30	(0)
1994–1996	Scarborough	30	(0)
1996–1997	Golden		
–	North Ferriby United		
–	Harrogate Town		
–	Whitby Town		
–2001	Bradford Park Avenue		
2001–2006	Bridlington Town		
- * Club domestic league appearances and goals

Gavin Kelly (born 29 September 1968) is an English former footballer, born in Beverley, who played as a goalkeeper in the Football League for Hull City, Bristol Rovers and Scarborough, and in the Hong Kong First Division League for Golden. He also played non-League football for clubs including North Ferriby United, Harrogate Town, Whitby Town, Bradford Park Avenue, and Bridlington Town.
