= Billy Askew =

English footballer

Personal information
- Date of birth: 2 October 1959 (age 67)
- Place of birth: Great Lumley, Durham, England
- Height: 5 ft 5 in (1.65 m)
- Position: Midfielder

Senior career*
Years	Team	Apps	(Gls)
1979–1982	Middlesbrough	12	(0)
1982–1990	Hull City	253	(19)
1990–1991	Newcastle United	11	(0)
1991	→ Shrewsbury Town (loan)	5	(0)
1991–1994	Gateshead		
1994–199?	Waterford United		
Total		281+	(19+)
- * Club domestic league appearances and goals

Billy Askew (born 2 October 1959) is an English footballer best known for his career with Hull City.

Askew attended Lord Lawson school in Birtley and began his career with Middlesbrough before joining Hull in 1982. A left-footed midfield dynamo, he was an integral part of the side's rise from the Fourth to Second Division in the 80s before leaving for Newcastle United in 1990. After a loan spell at Shrewsbury Town, he moved to Gateshead.

In 1994, he moved to Waterford United where he made 3 appearances.

After retiring from playing he was a publican in Hull. He is connected to the coaching staff at Darlington F.C.

== Honours ==
Hull City

- Associate Members' Cup runner-up: 1983–84
