= Alex Dyer (footballer, born 1965) =

English footballer and manager

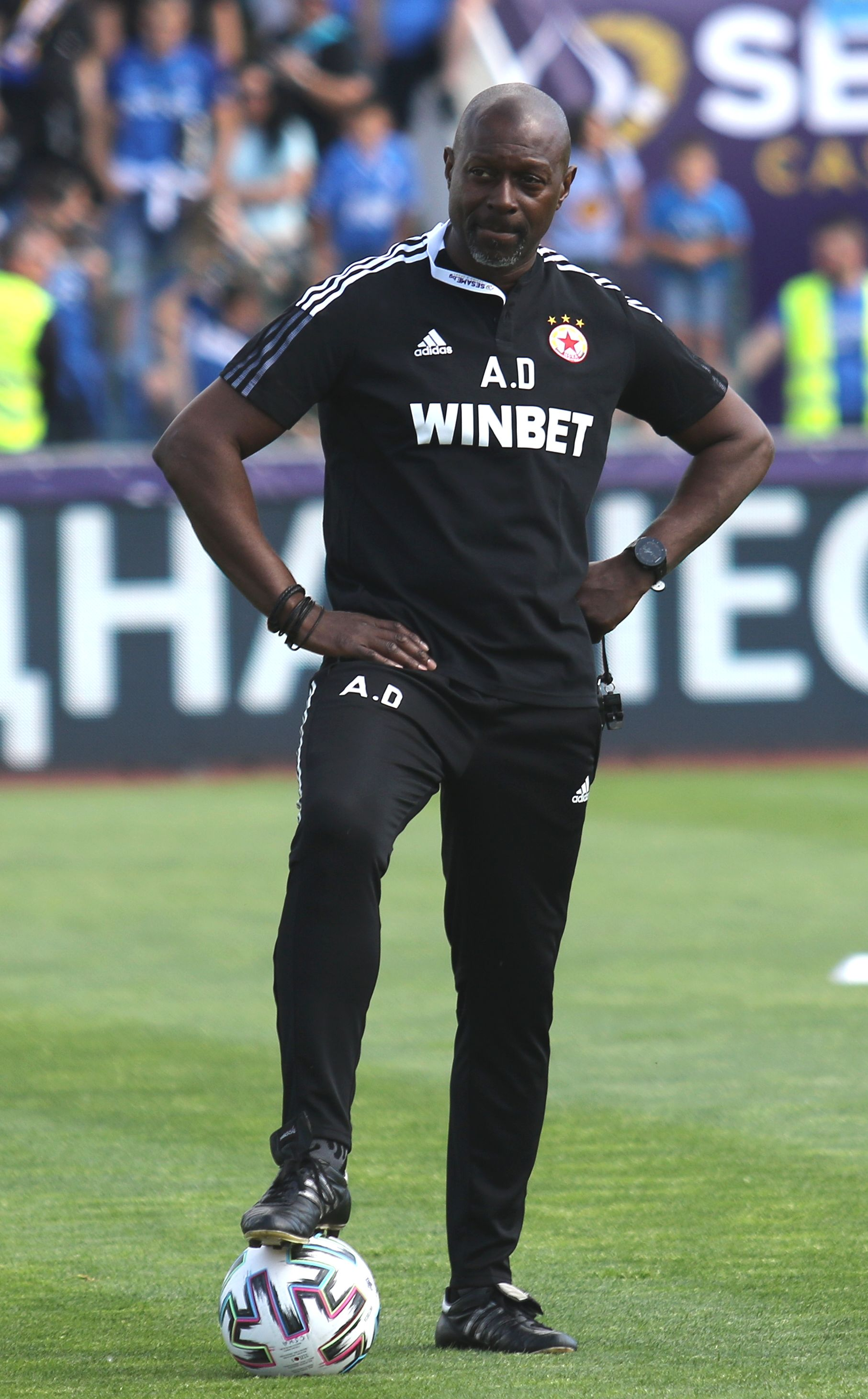

Personal information
- Full name: Alexander Constantine Dyer
- Date of birth: 14 November 1965 (age 60)
- Place of birth: Forest Gate, England
- Height: 5 ft 11 in (1.80 m)
- Position: Defender

Youth career
- 1982–1983: Watford

Senior career*
Years	Team	Apps	(Gls)
1983–1987	Blackpool	108	(19)
1987–1988	Hull City	60	(14)
1988–1990	Crystal Palace	17	(2)
1990–1993	Charlton Athletic	78	(13)
1993–1995	Oxford United	76	(6)
1995	Lincoln City	1	(0)
1995–1996	Barnet	35	(2)
1996–1997	Maia	0	(0)
1997–1998	Huddersfield Town	12	(1)
1998–2000	Notts County	80	(6)
2000–2001	Kingstonian	0	(0)
2001	Hayes	1	(0)
Total		469	(63)

Managerial career
- 2017: Welling United
- 2017: Whitehawk
- 2019–2021: Kilmarnock
- * Club domestic league appearances and goals

Alexander Constantine Dyer (born 14 November 1965) is an English football coach and former player. He is first-team coach at EFL League One club Bromley.

Dyer played mainly as a defender (he could also play in midfield) for eleven clubs in a seventeen-year professional career. His achievements as a player include helping Blackpool win promotion to the Third Division in 1985 and Crystal Palace to the First Division in 1989.

== Playing career ==
Dyer began his youth career at Watford, but did not make a senior appearance for the club, signing instead for Blackpool for whom he made 108 appearances between 1983 and 1987. He moved on to Hull City in 1987 making 60 appearances, scoring 14 times, over the next two seasons. On 9 November 1988 Dyer signed for Crystal Palace and made his debut on 12 November, as a substitute for Neil Redfearn in an away 0–2 defeat to AFC Bournemouth. Redfearn moved on to Watford on 18 November and Dyer took his number seven shirt for the next six games before losing his place to Eddie McGoldrick, who signed from Northampton Town on 9 January 1989. Those seven appearances (one goal) made up Dyer's total for the 1988–89 season in which Palace achieved promotion to the top tier. Dyer remained at Palace for the 1989–90 season making 10 further appearances and scoring one other goal, before moving on to Charlton Athletic. He subsequently played for, Oxford United, Lincoln City, Barnet, F.C. Maia (Portugal), Huddersfield Town and Notts County before moving into non-league football firstly with Kingstonian and then Hayes.

== Coaching and management career ==
Having been employed for eight months as a PE Teacher in a South London school, in April 2004 he joined West Ham United as assistant to sports scientist Tony Strudwick. His role at the club changed to conditioning coach in July 2007. and following Kevin Keen's promotion to first-team coach, reserve team coach in September 2008.

In January 2011 he left the Hammers to link up with Chris Powell as assistant manager at Charlton Athletic. On 27 May 2014 Dyer was sacked from Charlton after the appointment of Bob Peeters as manager.

Following the appointment of Powell as the new manager of Huddersfield Town, Dyer, a former Terrier himself, joined the Yorkshire side as assistant manager on 3 September 2014. When Powell was dismissed on 4 November 2015, Dyer also left his post.

On 7 April 2017 Dyer was appointed manager of Welling United until the end of the season. Despite being keen to continue in the manager's role, Welling announced a new management team for the coming season on 12 May 2017. Dyer was appointed as a first team coach at National League South club Whitehawk in October 2017.

He left Whitehawk within days to assist Steve Clarke at Kilmarnock. Clarke was appointed Scotland manager in June 2019, and Dyer became his assistant there while he continued as assistant manager at Kilmarnock under Angelo Alessio. Dyer was made caretaker manager of Kilmarnock after Alessio was sacked in December 2019. After three games in caretaker charge, Dyer was appointed Kilmarnock manager to the end of the 2019–20 season. In June 2020, Dyer signed a permanent two-year contract with Kilmarnock. On 30 January 2021, Dyer left Kilmarnock by mutual consent.

In June 2021 he joined Colchester United as assistant manager to Hayden Mullins. On 19 January 2022, Dyer departed the club.

Dyer was assistant to Alan Pardew at CSKA Sofia in Bulgaria. Dyer, who is black, left with Pardew on 1 June 2022 after what the manager described as a "small group of organised racist fans who tried to sabotage this match" against Botev Plovdiv on 19 May.

== Career statistics ==
=== Managerial record ===
As of match played 30 January 2021

Managerial record by team and tenure
Team	Nat	From	To	Record					Ref.
Team	Nat	From	To	G	W	D	L	Win %	Ref.
Kilmarnock	(Scotland)	20 December 2019	30 January 2021	43	13	5	25	30.23	
Career total				43	13	5	25	30.23	

- initially caretaker.
