= Richard Jobson (footballer) =

English footballer (born 1963)

Personal information
- Full name: Richard Ian Jobson
- Date of birth: 9 May 1963 (age 63)
- Place of birth: Hull, England
- Height: 6 ft 1 in (1.85 m)
- Position: Defender

Senior career*
Years	Team	Apps	(Gls)
1981–1982	Burton Albion	18	(2)
1982–1985	Watford	28	(4)
1985–1990	Hull City	221	(17)
1990–1995	Oldham Athletic	189	(10)
1995–1998	Leeds United	22	(1)
1998	→ Southend United (loan)	8	(1)
1998–2001	Manchester City	50	(4)
2000	→ Watford (loan)	2	(0)
2000–2001	→ Tranmere Rovers (loan)	6	(0)
2001	Tranmere Rovers	11	(0)
2001–2003	Rochdale	51	(3)
Total		606	(42)

International career
1992	England B	2	(0)
- * Club domestic league appearances and goals

Richard Ian Jobson (born 9 May 1963) is an English former footballer who made nearly 600 appearances in the Football League and Premier League over a twenty-year career, representing Watford, Hull City, Oldham Athletic, Leeds United, Southend United, Manchester City, Tranmere Rovers and Rochdale. He was capped twice for England B, and spent a year as chairman of the Professional Footballers' Association.

== Career ==
Jobson was born in Hull. He began his football career playing part-time for Burton Albion in the Northern Premier League while studying for a civil engineering degree at the University of Nottingham. In 1982, he abandoned his studies when Graham Taylor signed him for First Division club Watford. He played 13 times for the Hornets in 1982–83 – their first top division season ever – and scored once as they finished second. He managed 13 league appearances again in 1983–84 – this time scoring twice – but did not make the squad for the FA Cup final, which Watford lost 2–0 to Everton. He played twice, scoring once, in the 1984–85 season before accepting a £40,000 offer to join Third Division promotion challengers Hull City on 7 February 1985.

He quickly established himself as a regular in the Boothferry Park defence, securing promotion to the Second Division for the 1985–86 season and then helped them finish an impressive sixth at that level, just missing out on a place in the First Division for the first time. This was the closest he would come to a top flight return for another five years.

After 221 league appearances for them he was signed by Joe Royle's Oldham Athletic for a club record fee of £460,000 in 1990. He was a key player in their promotion to the first Division, and was called up to Taylor's England squad for matches in Czechoslovakia, but played only in the B internationals.

In five years, he played 189 league games for the Latics, scoring 10 goals. As well as the Second Division title medal in 1991, he came close to collecting a major honour in 1994 when the Latics reached the FA Cup semi-finals and only a late equaliser by Manchester United's Mark Hughes, followed by a 4–1 hammering in the replay, prevented Jobson for having a crack at the FA Cup final appearance he had missed out on with Watford a decade earlier. The Latics were relegated from the FA Premier League just after this disappointment, but Jobson remained loyal to them for more than a year afterwards despite their failure to return to the elite.

Jobson moved to Leeds United for £1 million on 26 October 1995, a year after Oldham's relegation from the Premiership, but his Leeds career was disrupted by injury and he spent time on loan to Southend United in 1997–98. He scored his first and only goal for Leeds in a 1–1 draw with Wimbledon in December 1995. Later that season he rejoined Joe Royle, then at Manchester City. Again, he suffered injuries, but still helped City reach the Premiership with two successive promotions. Royle decided that the 37-year-old Jobson was too old for the Premiership and he joined Tranmere Rovers. His only season at Prenton Park ended in relegation from Division One, and he then signed for Rochdale. He helped them qualify for the Division Three playoffs in his first season at Spotland, but featured less frequently in the following campaign and retired in May 2003, playing the final game of his career six days before his 40th birthday. By this date, he was one of the oldest professional players in England.

== PFA work ==
Jobson succeeded Nick Cusack as chairman of the Professional Footballers' Association (PFA) in November 2002, remaining in the post until he retired as a player. He then joined the PFA staff, and in 2009 was a senior executive in their player management department. He is married with three children.

== Honours ==
Oldham Athletic

- Football League Second Division: 1990–91
