= Frankie Bunn =

English football player and manager (born 1962)

Personal information
- Full name: Frank Stephen Bunn
- Date of birth: 6 November 1962 (age 63)
- Place of birth: Solihull, England
- Height: 5 ft 11 in (1.80 m)
- Position: Striker

Team information
- Current team: Wigan Athletic (U23 coach)

Senior career*
Years	Team	Apps	(Gls)
1980–1985	Luton Town	59	(9)
1985–1987	Hull City	95	(23)
1987–1990	Oldham Athletic	78	(26)
- Stalybridge Celtic
- Radcliffe Borough
Total		232	(58)

Managerial career
- 2008: Coventry City (joint caretaker)
- 2018: Oldham Athletic
- * Club domestic league appearances and goals

Frank Stephen Bunn (born 6 November 1962) is an English former professional footballer who is the U23 coach of League One club Wigan Athletic. He holds the Football League Cup record for the most goals (six) by a player in a single match, achieved in 1989.

== Career ==
Bunn played as a striker and began his career at Luton Town, and later played for Hull City and Oldham Athletic. His most famous moment as a player came on 25 October 1989, when he scored six goals in Oldham's 7–0 victory over Scarborough in the third round of the League Cup, which is still the League Cup record for most goals by a player in a single match.

In 1990, Bunn was forced to retire from professional football because of injury. He then joined Stalybridge Celtic and later Radcliffe Borough. He later became a coach and began his coaching career at Wigan Athletic, before joining Manchester City as reserve team coach in 1998. In February 2007, Bunn was appointed first-team coach at Coventry City, and on 11 February 2008, he was named joint caretaker manager along with John Harbin, following the dismissal of Iain Dowie. He returned to his old position as first-team coach following Chris Coleman's appointment as manager on 19 February 2008. He left the club in May 2010 after his contract expired.

In June 2011, Bunn was appointed as Steve Eyre's assistant manager at Rochdale. In July 2012, he joined Huddersfield Town as a professional development coach working with the academy under-18 team.

Bunn was appointed manager of newly relegated League Two club Oldham Athletic on 13 June 2018 on a one-year contract, but sacked the following December.

In July 2019, he joined Wigan Athletic and as of the 2020–21 season is the coach of their U23 side.

== Personal life ==
Bunn's son, Harry Bunn, is a professional footballer.

== Managerial statistics ==
As of match played 26 December 2018

Managerial record by team and tenure
Team	From	To	Record					Ref.
Team	From	To	P	W	D	L	Win %	Ref.
Coventry City (joint caretaker)	11 February 2008	19 February 2008	2	0	1	1	0.0	
Oldham Athletic	13 June 2018	27 December 2018	31	12	8	11	38.7	
Total			33	12	9	12	36.4	—

== Honours ==
Oldham Athletic

- Football League Cup runner-up: 1989–90
