= Don Robinson (British businessman) =

British businessman and wrestler (1934–2025)

- Born: Donald Robinson; 27 June 1934; Scarborough, England
- Died: 6 November 2025 (aged 91)
- Occupations: Businessman; events promoter; media proprietor; wrestler
- Spouse: Jean Robinson
- Professional wrestling career
- Ring name: Dr. Death

Donald Robinson (27 June 1934 – 6 November 2025) was a British businessman, who initially gained fame as a professional wrestler and events promoter.

Robinson would later be known for his involvements with association football clubs Scarborough and Hull City, as well as his ownership and chairmanship of a wide variety of businesses.

== Early life ==
Donald Robinson was born in Scarborough, North Riding of Yorkshire on 27 June 1934.

== Career ==
=== Wrestling ===
Having originally tried his hand at rugby league with Hull Kingston Rovers, Robinson turned to professional wrestling when he was introduced by a friend. He decided he would go by the ring name "Dr. Death", after being given permission to use the alias by another friend, Paul Lincoln, who had already adopted it in 1951. Despite this, Robinson would soon gain national fame as a wrestling events promoter instead. Working independently, his charisma and "larger than life" personality saw him quickly become one of the best promoters in England.

In January 1965, the BBC hosted a wrestling event in Southend-on-Sea, Essex, and chose Robinson to promote it. It was through this event that he formed a long-term friendship with fellow promoter Jarvis Astaire. Robinson would go on to advertise events around the world, introducing professional wrestling to India, Finland, and Poland, as well as re-introducing it to Sweden. During these ventures, he gave many new wrestlers their careers. Johnny Saint went professional through Robinson, whilst he also brought Klondike Bill to England. Furthermore, Robinson's expertise led to him being appointed chairman of the Wrestling Federation of Great Britain.

=== Football ===
Robinson later became chairman of boyhood football club Scarborough, who were in non-league at the time. However, in mid-1982, he made the decision to leave the Seadogs for Fourth Division side Hull City. The Tigers had become the first Football League outfit to enter receivership earlier that year, but were saved from financial woe when Robinson bought a majority stake in the club. Upon arrival in the East Riding of Yorkshire, he appointed Scarborough boss Colin Appleton as the club's new manager. The duo then oversaw immediate success, with Hull earning promotion via a second-placed finish in their first season in charge. Robinson was considered an eccentric chairman, inventing a club-branded version of Coca-Cola known as 'Tiger Cola' and stating his hope that his team would be one of the first two sides to play a football match on the moon. Another promotion followed in 1985, as the Tigers advanced to the Second Division. After stagnating just below the top flight for the next few seasons, Robinson left Hull City in October 1989, following seven-and-a-half successful years with the club.

=== Other ventures ===
In 1965, Robinson, co-founded Radio 270, a pirate radio station which served Yorkshire and the North East between 1966 and 1967. From 1971 until 1982, he was chairman of the British and Irish Association of Zoos and Aquariums. Robinson's involvement with theme parks and zoos does not end there. He has previously owned and operated Flamingo Land Resort in his native Scarborough, as well as Dudley Zoo and Windsor Safari Park. In 1985, Robinson was a director for Live Aid.

== Personal life and death ==
Robinson married a woman named Jean. As of 2012, he still lived in Scarborough. He died on 6 November 2025, at the age of 91.

== Biography ==
Robinson's life was documented by David Fowler in a biography Don Robinson: The Story of a High Flier, first published in 2014.
