= 1992–93 Hull City A.F.C. season =

English football club season

Hull City
1992–93 season
- Chairman: Martin Fish
- Manager: Terry Dolan
- Stadium: Boothferry Park
- Second Division: 20th
- FA Cup: Second round
- League Cup: First round
- League Trophy: Second round
- Top goalscorer: League: Graeme Atkinson (6); All: Graeme Atkinson (8)
Home colours	Away colours

The 1992–93 season was the 89th season in the history of Hull City Association Football Club and their first season in the Second Division since 1990–91, yet their second consecutive season in the third tier. This was due to the introduction of the Premier League, which led to the renaming of the tiers beneath it. In addition to the domestic league, the club would also participate in the FA Cup, the League Cup, and the League Trophy.

== Competitions ==
=== Second Division ===
==== League table ====
Pos	Team	Pld	W	D	L	GF	GA	GD	Pts	Qualification or relegation
18	Blackpool	46	12	15	19	63	75	−12	51	
19	Exeter City	46	11	17	18	54	69	−15	50	
20	Hull City	46	13	11	22	46	69	−23	50	
21	Preston North End (R)	46	13	8	25	65	94	−29	47	Relegation to the Third Division
22	Mansfield Town (R)	46	11	11	24	52	80	−28	44	Relegation to the Third Division

Rules for classification: 1) Points; 2) Goals scored; 3) Goal difference
(R) Relegated

==== Results summary ====
Overall								Home						Away					
Pld	W	D	L	GF	GA	GD	Pts	W	D	L	GF	GA	GD	W	D	L	GF	GA	GD
46	13	11	22	46	69	−23	50	9	5	9	28	26	+2	4	6	13	18	43	−25

Source: Soccerbase

==== Matches ====
Win Draw Loss

#	Date	Home	Result	Away	Venue
1	15.08.92	Hull City	1–0	Stoke City	H
2	22.08.92	Hull City	1–1	Chester City	H
3	28.08.92	Hull City	2–0	Plymouth Argyle	H
4	01.09.92	Hull City	1–0	Swansea City	H
5	05.09.92	Reading	1–2	Hull City	A
6	12.09.92	Stockport County	5–3	Hull City	A
7	15.09.92	Hull City	2–4	Preston North End	H
8	19.09.92	Hull City	0–1	Rotherham United	H
9	26.09.92	Leyton Orient	0–0	Hull City	A
10	03.10.92	Hull City	0–2	Bradford City	H
11	10.10.92	Fulham	3–3	Hull City	A
12	17.10.92	Hull City	2–3	Huddersfield Town	H
13	24.10.92	Bolton Wanderers	2–0	Hull City	A
14	31.10.92	Hull City	1–2	West Bromwich Albion	H
15	03.11.92	Mansfield Town	3–1	Hull City	A
16	07.11.92	Hull City	0–2	Burnley	H
17	21.11.92	Port Vale	1–1	Hull City	A
18	28.11.92	Hull City	3–2	Blackpool	H
19	12.12.92	Hull City	4–0	Exeter City	H
20	19.12.92	Bournemouth	0–0	Hull City	A
21	26.12.92	Hartlepool United	1–0	Hull City	A
22	28.12.92	Hull City	1–0	Brighton & Hove Albion	H
23	09.01.93	Preston North End	1–2	Hull City	A
24	16.01.93	Hull City	0–0	Leyton Orient	H
25	26.01.93	Plymouth Argyle	0–0	Hull City	A
26	30.01.93	Chester City	3–0	Hull City	A
27	06.02.93	Stoke City	3–0	Hull City	A
28	09.02.93	Rotherham United	0–1	Hull City	A
29	13.02.93	Hull City	1–1	Reading	H
30	20.02.93	Swansea City	1–0	Hull City	A
31	27.02.93	Hull City	0–0	Wigan Athletic	H
32	06.03.93	Bradford City	1–2	Hull City	A
33	09.03.93	Hull City	1–1	Fulham	H
34	13.03.93	Burnley	2–0	Hull City	A
35	20.03.93	Hull City	1–0	Mansfield Town	H
36	23.03.93	Blackpool	5–1	Hull City	A
37	27.03.93	Hull City	0–1	Port Vale	H
38	03.04.93	Wigan Athletic	2–0	Hull City	A
39	06.04.93	Exeter City	1–1	Hull City	A
40	10.04.93	Hull City	3–2	Hartlepool United	H
41	14.04.93	Brighton & Hove Albion	2–0	Hull City	A
42	17.04.93	Hull City	3–0	Bournemouth	H
43	24.04.93	Huddersfield Town	3–0	Hull City	A
44	27.04.93	Hull City	0–2	Stockport County	H
45	30.04.93	Hull City	1–2	Bolton Wanderers	H
46	08.05.93	West Bromwich Albion	3–1	Hull City	A

=== FA Cup ===
==== Matches ====
Win Draw Loss

#	Date	Home	Result	Away	Venue
First	14.11.92	Darlington	1–2	Hull City	A
Second	05.12.92	Rotherham United	1–0	Hull City	A

=== League Cup ===
==== Matches ====
Win Draw Loss

#	Date	Home	Result	Away	Venue
First	18.08.92	Hull City	2–2	Rotherham United	H
First	25.08.92	Rotherham United	1–0	Hull City	A

=== League Trophy ===
==== Matches ====
Win Draw Loss

#	Date	Home	Result	Away	Venue
First	08.12.92	York City	0–0	Hull City	A
First	15.12.92	Hull City	2–1	Doncaster Rovers	H
Second	12.01.93	Hull City	0–1	Chesterfield	H

== Squad ==
Name	Position	Nationality	Place of birth	Date of birth (age) (Note: Players' ages listed as they were on 1 July 1992, the official start date of the 1992–93 season)	Previous club	Date signed	Fee
Goalkeepers
Alan Fettis	GK	NIR	Newtownards	1 February 1971 (age 21)	(Northern Ireland) Ards	July 1991	£50,000
Steve Wilson	GK	ENG	Hull	24 April 1974 (age 18)	Academy	4 May 1991	–
Defenders
Neil Allison	DF	ENG	Hull	20 October 1973 (age 18)	Academy	May 1991	–
Pat Heard	DF	ENG	Hull	17 March 1960 (age 32)	Hall Road Rangers	August 1992	Unknown
Gary Hobson	DF	ENG	North Ferriby	12 November 1972 (age 19)	Academy	April 1991	–
Dave Hockaday	DF	ENG	Sedgefield	9 November 1957 (age 34)	Swindon Town	September 1990	£50,000
Wayne Jacobs	DF	ENG	Sheffield	3 February 1969 (age 23)	Sheffield Wednesday	March 1988	Unknown
David Mail	DF	ENG	Bristol	12 September 1962 (age 29)	Blackburn Rovers	July 1990	Unknown
Rob Miller	DF	ENG	Manchester	3 November 1972 (age 19)	Oldham Athletic	October 1992	Free
Nicky Mohan	DF	ENG	Middlesbrough	6 October 1970 (age 21)	Middlesbrough	September 1992	Loan
Lee Warren	DF	ENG	Manchester	28 February 1969 (age 23)	Rochdale	August 1988	Unknown
Russ Wilcox	DF	ENG	Hemsworth	25 March 1964 (age 28)	Northampton Town	August 1990	Unknown
Midfielders
Greg Abbott	MF	ENG	Coventry	14 December 1963 (age 28)	Guiseley	December 1992	Unknown
Graeme Atkinson	MF	ENG	Hull	11 November 1971 (age 20)	Academy	July 1989	–
Mark Calvert	MF	ENG	Consett	11 September 1970 (age 21)	Academy	July 1988	–
Leigh Jenkinson	MF	ENG	Thorne	9 July 1969 (age 22)	Academy	July 1986	–
Dave Norton	MF	ENG	Cannock	3 March 1965 (age 27)	Notts County	July 1991	Unknown
Gareth Stoker	MF	ENG	Bishop Auckland	22 February 1973 (age 19)	Leeds United	September 1991	Free
Dean Stowe	MF	ENG	Burnley	27 March 1975 (age 17)	Academy	March 1993	
Gareth Williams	MF	ENG	Newport	12 March 1967 (age 25)	Barnsley	September 1992	Loan
Forwards
Linton Brown	FW	ENG	Hull	12 April 1968 (age 24)	Halifax Town	January 1993	Unknown
Martin Carruthers	FW	ENG	Nottingham	7 August 1972 (age 19)	Aston Villa	October 1992	Loan
Matt Edeson	FW	ENG	Beverley	11 August 1976 (age 15)	Academy	October 1992	
Darren France	FW	ENG	Hull	8 August 1967 (age 24)	North Ferriby United	November 1991	Unknown
Paul Hunter	FW	SCO	Kirkcaldy	30 August 1968 (age 23)	(Scotland) East Fife	March 1990	£150,000
David Jones	FW	ENG	Harrow	3 July 1964 (age 27)	Bury	February 1993	Free
Gary Lund	FW	ENG	Cleethorpes	13 September 1964 (age 27)	Notts County	August 1992	Loan
Dean Windass	FW	ENG	Hull	1 April 1969 (age 23)	North Ferriby United	October 1991	Unknown
Stuart Young	FW	ENG	Hull	16 December 1972 (age 19)	Arsenal	July 1991	Free
