= 1990–91 Hull City A.F.C. season =

English football club season

Hull City
1990–91 season
- Chairman: Richard Chetham
- Manager: Stan Ternent (until 3 January); Tom Wilson (interim, 3 January–31 January); Terry Dolan (from 21 January)
- Stadium: Boothferry Park
- Second Division: 24th (relegated)
- FA Cup: Third round
- League Cup: Third round
- Full Members' Cup: First Round
- Top goalscorer: League: Andy Payton (25); All: Andy Payton (25)
Home colours	Away colours

The 1990–91 season was the 87th season in the history of Hull City Association Football Club and their sixth consecutive season in the Second Division. In addition to the domestic league, the club would also participate in the FA Cup, the League Cup, and the Full Members' Cup.

== Competitions ==
=== Second Division ===
==== League table ====
Pos	Team	Pld	W	D	L	GF	GA	GD	Pts	Qualification or relegation
20	Watford	46	12	15	19	45	59	−14	51	
21	Swindon Town	46	12	14	20	65	73	−8	50	
22	Leicester City	46	14	8	24	60	83	−23	50	
23	West Bromwich Albion (R)	46	10	18	18	52	61	−9	48	Relegation to the Third Division
24	Hull City (R)	46	10	15	21	57	85	−28	45	Relegation to the Third Division

Rules for classification: 1) Points; 2) Goal difference; 3) Goals scored
(R) Relegated

==== Results summary ====
Overall								Home						Away					
Pld	W	D	L	GF	GA	GD	Pts	W	D	L	GF	GA	GD	W	D	L	GF	GA	GD
46	10	15	21	57	85	−28	45	6	10	7	35	32	+3	4	5	14	22	53	−31

Source: Soccerbase

==== Matches ====
Win Draw Loss

#	Date	Home	Result	Away	Venue
1	25.08.90	Hull City	0–1	Notts County	H
2	28.08.90	Blackburn Rovers	2–1	Hull City	A
3	01.09.90	Sheffield Wednesday	5–1	Hull City	A
4	08.09.90	Hull City	1–1	Swindon Town	H
5	15.09.90	Bristol Rovers	1–1	Hull City	A
6	19.09.90	Millwall	3–3	Hull City	A
7	22.09.90	Hull City	1–1	West Bromwich Albion	H
8	29.09.90	Hull City	3–2	Port Vale	H
9	02.10.90	Watford	0–1	Hull City	A
10	06.10.90	West Ham United	7–1	Hull City	A
11	13.10.90	Hull City	2–2	Oldham Athletic	H
12	20.10.90	Hull City	1–2	Wolverhampton Wanderers	H
13	24.10.90	Brighton & Hove Albion	3–1	Hull City	A
14	27.10.90	Plymouth Argyle	4–1	Hull City	A
15	03.11.90	Hull City	2–1	Newcastle United	H
16	10.11.90	Hull City	3–3	Ipswich Town	H
17	17.11.90	Bristol City	4–1	Hull City	A
18	23.11.90	Hull City	5–2	Leicester City	H
19	01.12.90	Middlesbrough	3–0	Hull City	A
20	08.12.90	Hull City	3–1	Blackburn Rovers	H
21	15.12.90	Notts County	2–1	Hull City	A
22	22.12.90	Charlton Athletic	2–1	Hull City	A
23	26.12.90	Hull City	3–3	Oxford United	H
24	29.12.90	Hull City	1–2	Barnsley	H
25	01.01.91	Portsmouth	5–1	Hull City	A
26	12.01.91	Hull City	0–1	Sheffield Wednesday	H
27	19.01.91	Swindon Town	3–1	Hull City	A
28	02.02.91	Hull City	2–0	Bristol Rovers	H
29	16.02.91	Hull City	1–2	Bristol City	H
30	23.02.91	Ipswich Town	2–0	Hull City	A
31	02.03.91	Hull City	0–0	Middlesbrough	H
32	09.03.91	Leicester City	0–1	Hull City	A
33	12.03.91	Hull City	1–1	Watford	H
34	16.03.91	Port Vale	0–0	Hull City	A
35	20.03.91	Oldham Athletic	1–2	Hull City	A
36	23.03.91	Hull City	0–0	West Ham United	H
37	30.03.91	Oxford United	1–0	Hull City	A
38	01.04.91	Hull City	2–2	Charlton Athletic	H
39	06.04.91	Barnsley	3–1	Hull City	A
40	10.04.91	West Bromwich Albion	1–1	Hull City	A
41	13.04.91	Hull City	0–2	Portsmouth	H
42	16.04.91	Hull City	1–1	Millwall	H
43	20.04.91	Wolverhampton Wanderers	0–0	Hull City	A
44	27.04.91	Hull City	0–1	Brighton & Hove Albion	H
45	04.05.91	Hull City	2–0	Plymouth Argyle	H
46	11.05.91	Newcastle United	1–2	Hull City	A

=== FA Cup ===
==== Matches ====
Win Draw Loss

#	Date	Home	Result	Away	Venue
Third	05.01.91	Hull City	2–5	Notts County	H

=== League Cup ===
==== Matches ====
Win Draw Loss

#	Date	Home	Result	Away	Venue
Second	25.09.90	Hull City	0–0	Wolverhampton Wanderers	H
Second	09.10.90	Wolverhampton Wanderers	1–1 (Note: Hull City won the tie on away goals)	Hull City	A
Third	31.10.90	Coventry City	3–0	Hull City	A

=== Full Members' Cup ===
==== Matches ====
Win Draw Loss

#	Date	Home	Result	Away	Venue
First	20.11.90	Middlesbrough	3–1	Hull City	A

== Squad ==
Name	Position	Nationality	Place of birth	Date of birth (age) (Note: Players' ages listed as they were on 1 July 1990, the official start date of the 1990–91 season)	Previous club	Date signed	Fee
Goalkeepers
Lee Butler	GK	ENG	Sheffield	30 May 1966 (age 24)	Aston Villa	March 1991	Loan
Kevin Dearden	GK	ENG	Luton	8 March 1970 (age 20)	Tottenham Hotspur	January 1991	Loan
Iain Hesford	GK	ENG	(Northern Rhodesia) Ndola	4 March 1960 (age 30)	Sunderland	December 1988	Swap deal
Steve Wilson	GK	ENG	Hull	24 April 1974 (age 16)	Academy	4 May 1991	–
Tommy Wright	GK	NIR	Ballyclare	29 August 1963 (age 26)	Newcastle United	February 1991	Loan
Defenders
Nicky Brown	DF	ENG	Hull	16 October 1966 (age 23)	Academy	September 1985	–
Neil Buckley	DF	ENG	Hull	25 September 1968 (age 21)	Academy	July 1985	–
Gary Hobson	DF	ENG	North Ferriby	12 November 1972 (age 17)	Academy	April 1991	–
Dave Hockaday	DF	ENG	Sedgefield	9 November 1957 (age 32)	Swindon Town	September 1990	£50,000
Wayne Jacobs	DF	ENG	Sheffield	3 February 1969 (age 21)	Sheffield Wednesday	March 1988	Unknown
David Mail	DF	ENG	Bristol	12 September 1962 (age 27)	Blackburn Rovers	July 1990	Unknown
Malcolm Shotton	DF	ENG	Newcastle	16 February 1957 (age 33)	Barnsley	February 1990	Unknown
Peter Swan	DF	ENG	Leeds	28 September 1966 (age 23)	Leeds United	March 1989	£200,000
Les Thompson	DF	ENG	Cleethorpes	23 September 1968 (age 21)	Grimsby Town	May 1987	Free
Lee Warren	DF	ENG	Manchester	28 February 1969 (age 21)	Rochdale	August 1988	Unknown
Russ Wilcox	DF	ENG	Hemsworth	25 March 1964 (age 26)	Northampton Town	August 1990	Unknown
Midfielders
Graeme Atkinson	MF	ENG	Hull	11 November 1971 (age 18)	Academy	July 1989	–
Mark Calvert	MF	ENG	Consett	11 September 1970 (age 19)	Academy	July 1988	–
Ken DeMange	MF	IRL	Dublin	3 September 1964 (age 25)	Leeds United	March 1988	£65,000
Steve Doyle	MF	WAL	Neath	2 June 1958 (age 32)	Sunderland	August 1989	–
Tony Finnigan	MF	ENG	Wimbledon	17 October 1962 (age 27)	Blackburn Rovers	August 1990	Unknown
Leigh Jenkinson	MF	ENG	Thorne	9 July 1969 (age 20)	Academy	July 1986	–
Harry Ngata	MF	NZL	Whanganui	24 August 1971 (age 18)	(New Zealand) Porirua Viard United	December 1987	Free
Leigh Palin	MF	ENG	Worcester	12 September 1965 (age 24)	Stoke City	March 1990	Unknown
Garreth Roberts	MF	ENG	Hull	15 November 1960 (age 29)	Academy	March 1979	–
Gwyn Thomas	MF	WAL	Swansea	26 September 1957 (age 32)	Barnsley	March 1990	£25,000
Paul Waites	MF	ENG	Hull	24 January 1971 (age 19)	Academy	May 1990	–
Forwards
Dave Bamber	FW	ENG	Prescot	1 February 1959 (age 31)	Stoke City	February 1990	Unknown
Paul Hunter	FW	SCO	Kirkcaldy	30 August 1968 (age 21)	(Scotland) East Fife	March 1990	£150,000
Ian McParland	FW	SCO	Edinburgh	4 October 1961 (age 28)	Notts County	March 1989	Unknown
Andy Payton	FW	ENG	Whalley	23 October 1967 (age 22)	Burnley	July 1985	Free
Mike Smith	FW	ENG	Hull	19 December 1968 (age 21)	Academy	May 1987	–
David Walmsley	FW	ENG	Hull	23 November 1972 (age 17)	Academy	May 1991	–
