= 1991–92 Hull City A.F.C. season =

English football club season

Hull City
1991–92 season
- Chairman: Martin Fish
- Manager: Terry Dolan
- Stadium: Boothferry Park
- Third Division: 14th
- FA Cup: Third round
- League Cup: Second round
- League Trophy: Quarter-finals
- Top goalscorer: League: Graeme Atkinson (8); Leigh Jenkinson (8); All: Leigh Jenkinson (9)
Home colours	Away colours

The 1991–92 season was the 88th season in the history of Hull City Association Football Club and their first season back in the Third Division following relegation. In addition to the domestic league, the club would also participate in the FA Cup, the League Cup, and the League Trophy.

== Competitions ==
=== Third Division ===
==== League table ====
Pos	Team	Pld	W	D	L	GF	GA	GD	Pts	Promotion or relegation
12	Reading	46	16	13	17	59	62	−3	61	Qualification for the Second Division (Note: From the 1992–93 season, the second tier - then known as the Second Division - was renamed to the First Division, the third tier - then known as the Third Division - was renamed to the Second Division, and the fourth tier - then known as the Fourth Division - was renamed to the Third Division.)
13	Bolton Wanderers	46	14	17	15	57	56	+1	59	Qualification for the Second Division
14	Hull City	46	16	11	19	54	54	0	59	Qualification for the Second Division
15	Wigan Athletic	46	15	14	17	58	64	−6	59	Qualification for the Second Division
16	Bradford City	46	13	19	14	62	61	+1	58	Qualification for the Second Division

==== Results summary ====
Overall								Home						Away					
Pld	W	D	L	GF	GA	GD	Pts	W	D	L	GF	GA	GD	W	D	L	GF	GA	GD
46	16	11	19	54	54	0	59	9	4	10	28	23	+5	7	7	9	26	31	−5

Source: Soccerbase

==== Matches ====
Win Draw Loss

#	Date	Home	Result	Away	Venue
1	17.08.91	Reading	0–1	Hull City	A
2	24.08.91	Hull City	1–2	Peterborough United	H
3	31.08.91	Bournemouth	0–0	Hull City	A
4	03.09.91	Hull City	1–2	Birmingham City	H
5	07.09.91	Hull City	0–1	Bury	H
6	14.09.91	Wigan Athletic	0–1	Hull City	A
7	17.09.91	Brentford	4–1	Hull City	A
8	21.09.91	Hull City	4–1	Torquay United	H
9	28.09.91	West Bromwich Albion	1–0	Hull City	A
10	05.10.91	Hull City	1–2	Exeter City	H
11	11.10.91	Swansea City	0–0	Hull City	A
12	19.10.91	Hartlepool United	2–3	Hull City	A
13	26.10.91	Hull City	5–2	Darlington	H
14	02.11.91	Fulham	0–0	Hull City	A
15	05.11.91	Hull City	4–0	Shrewsbury Town	H
16	09.11.91	Hull City	1–0	Chester City	H
17	23.11.91	Leyton Orient	1–0	Hull City	A
18	30.11.91	Hull City	2–2	Preston North End	H
19	14.12.91	Bolton Wanderers	1–0	Hull City	A
20	20.12.91	Peterborough United	3–0	Hull City	A
21	26.12.91	Hull City	0–1	Bournemouth	H
22	28.12.91	Hull City	0–1	Reading	H
23	01.01.92	Birmingham City	2–2	Hull City	A
24	11.01.92	Hull City	0–2	Stockport County	H
25	18.01.92	Bradford City	2–1	Hull City	A
26	25.01.92	Hull City	0–1	Stoke City	H
27	01.02.92	Hull City	0–2	Hartlepool United	H
28	08.02.92	Darlington	0–1	Hull City	A
29	11.02.92	Preston North End	3–1	Hull City	A
30	22.02.92	Stockport County	1–1	Hull City	A
31	25.02.92	Huddersfield Town	1–1	Hull City	A
32	20.02.92	Hull City	1–0	Huddersfield Town	H
33	03.03.92	Hull City	0–0	Bradford City	H
34	07.03.92	Stoke City	2–3	Hull City	A
35	10.03.92	Shrewsbury Town	2–3	Hull City	A
36	14.03.92	Hull City	0–0	Fulham	H
37	21.03.93	Chester City	1–1	Hull City	A
38	28.03.92	Hull City	1–0	Leyton Orient	H
39	31.03.92	Hull City	1–1	Wigan Athletic	H
40	04.04.92	Bury	3–2	Hull City	A
41	11.04.92	Hull City	0–3	Brentford	H
42	14.04.92	Torquay United	2–1	Hull City	A
43	20.04.92	Hull City	1–0	West Bromwich Albion	H
44	25.04.92	Exeter City	0–3	Hull City	A
45	29.04.92	Hull City	2–0	Bolton Wanderers	H
46	02.05.92	Hull City	3–0	Swansea City	H

=== FA Cup ===
==== Matches ====
Win Draw Loss

#	Date	Home	Result	Away	Venue
First	16.11.91	Morecambe	0–1	Hull City	A
Second	07.12.91	Blackpool	0–1	Hull City	A
Third	04.01.92	Hull City	0–2	Chelsea	H

=== League Cup ===
==== Matches ====
Win Draw Loss

#	Date	Home	Result	Away	Venue
First	20.08.91	Blackburn Rovers	1–1	Hull City	A
First	27.08.91	Hull City	1–0	Blackburn Rovers	H
Second	24.09.91	Hull City	0–3	Queens Park Rangers	H
Second	09.10.91	Queens Park Rangers	5–1	Hull City	A

=== League Trophy ===
==== Matches ====
Win Draw Loss

#	Date	Home	Result	Away	Venue
Preliminary	22.10.91	Hull City	2–1	Bradford City	H
Preliminary	07.01.92	Hartlepool United	2–0	Hull City	A
First	14.01.92	Preston North End	2–3	Hull City	A
Second	04.02.92	Crewe Alexandra	1–0	Hull City	A

== Squad ==
Name	Position	Nationality	Place of birth	Date of birth (age) (Note: Players' ages listed as they were on 1 July 1991, the official start date of the 1991–92 season)	Previous club	Date signed	Fee
Goalkeepers
Alan Fettis	GK	NIR	Newtownards	1 February 1971 (age 20)	(Northern Ireland) Ards	July 1991	£50,000
Steve Wilson	GK	ENG	Hull	24 April 1974 (age 17)	Academy	4 May 1991	–
Defenders
Neil Allison	DF	ENG	Hull	20 October 1973 (age 17)	Academy	May 1991	–
Nicky Brown	DF	ENG	Hull	16 October 1966 (age 24)	Academy	September 1985	–
Neil Buckley	DF	ENG	Hull	25 September 1968 (age 22)	Academy	July 1985	–
Gary Hobson	DF	ENG	North Ferriby	12 November 1972 (age 18)	Academy	April 1991	–
Dave Hockaday	DF	ENG	Sedgefield	9 November 1957 (age 33)	Swindon Town	September 1990	£50,000
Wayne Jacobs	DF	ENG	Sheffield	3 February 1969 (age 22)	Sheffield Wednesday	March 1988	Unknown
David Mail	DF	ENG	Bristol	12 September 1962 (age 28)	Blackburn Rovers	July 1990	Unknown
Malcolm Shotton	DF	ENG	Newcastle	16 February 1957 (age 34)	Barnsley	February 1990	Unknown
Lee Warren	DF	ENG	Manchester	28 February 1969 (age 22)	Rochdale	August 1988	Unknown
Russ Wilcox	DF	ENG	Hemsworth	25 March 1964 (age 27)	Northampton Town	August 1990	Unknown
Midfielders
Graeme Atkinson	MF	ENG	Hull	11 November 1971 (age 19)	Academy	July 1989	–
Mark Calvert	MF	ENG	Consett	11 September 1970 (age 20)	Academy	July 1988	–
Ken DeMange	MF	IRL	Dublin	3 September 1964 (age 26)	Leeds United	March 1988	£65,000
Leigh Jenkinson	MF	ENG	Thorne	9 July 1969 (age 21)	Academy	July 1986	–
Mick Matthews	MF	ENG	Hull	25 September 1960 (age 30)	Scarborough	August 1991	Unknown
Harry Ngata	MF	NZL	Whanganui	24 August 1971 (age 19)	(New Zealand) Porirua Viard United	December 1987	Free
Dave Norton	MF	ENG	Cannock	3 March 1965 (age 26)	Notts County	July 1991	Unknown
Leigh Palin	MF	ENG	Worcester	12 September 1965 (age 25)	Stoke City	March 1990	Unknown
Gareth Stoker	MF	ENG	Bishop Auckland	22 February 1973 (age 18)	Leeds United	September 1991	Free
Paul Waites	MF	ENG	Hull	24 January 1971 (age 20)	Academy	May 1990	–
Forwards
Darren France	FW	ENG	Hull	8 August 1967 (age 23)	North Ferriby United	November 1991	Unknown
Paul Hunter	FW	SCO	Kirkcaldy	30 August 1968 (age 22)	(Scotland) East Fife	March 1990	£150,000
Tony Kelly	FW	ENG	Coventry	14 February 1966 (age 25)	Stoke City	February 1992	Loan
Andy Payton	FW	ENG	Whalley	23 October 1967 (age 23)	Burnley	July 1985	Free
John Pearson	FW	ENG	Sheffield	1 September 1963 (age 27)	Barnsley	January 1992	Loan
David Walmsley	FW	ENG	Hull	23 November 1972 (age 18)	Academy	May 1991	–
Dean Windass	FW	ENG	Hull	1 April 1969 (age 22)	North Ferriby United	October 1991	Unknown
Stuart Young	FW	ENG	Hull	16 December 1972 (age 18)	Arsenal	July 1991	Free
