= 1989–90 Hull City A.F.C. season =

English football club season

Hull City
1989–90 season
- Chairman: Don Robinson (until October); Richard Chetham (from October)
- Manager: Colin Appleton (until 30 October); Tom Wilson (interim, 30 October–8 November); Stan Ternent (from 8 November)
- Stadium: Boothferry Park
- Second Division: 14th
- FA Cup: Third round
- League Cup: First round
- Full Members' Cup: Second round
- Top goalscorer: League: Andy Payton (17); All: Andy Payton (18)
Home colours	Away colours

The 1989–90 season was the 86th season in the history of Hull City Association Football Club and their fifth consecutive season in the Second Division. In addition to the domestic league, the club would also participate in the FA Cup, the League Cup, and the Full Members' Cup.

== Competitions ==
=== Second Division ===
==== League table ====
Pos	Team	Pld	W	D	L	GF	GA	GD	Pts
12	Portsmouth	46	15	16	15	62	65	−3	61
13	Leicester City	46	15	14	17	67	79	−12	59
14	Hull City	46	14	16	16	58	65	−7	58
15	Watford	46	14	15	17	58	60	−2	57
16	Plymouth Argyle	46	14	13	19	58	63	−5	55

Source: Statto
Rules for classification: 1) Points; 2) Goal difference; 3) Goals scored

==== Results summary ====
Overall								Home						Away					
Pld	W	D	L	GF	GA	GD	Pts	W	D	L	GF	GA	GD	W	D	L	GF	GA	GD
46	14	16	16	58	65	−7	58	7	8	8	27	31	−4	7	8	8	31	34	−3

Source: Soccerbase

==== Matches ====
Win Draw Loss

#	Date	Home	Result	Away	Venue	Att.	Scorers (Note: Hull scorers only)
1	19.08.89	Hull City	1–1	Leicester City	H	8,158	Payton
2	26.08.89	Bournemouth	5–4	Hull City	A	6,454	Payton (3), McParland
3	02.09.89	Hull City	1–1	West Ham United	H	9,235	Swan
4	09.09.89	Portsmouth	2–2	Hull City	A	6,496	Swan (2)
5	12.09.89	Port Vale	1–1	Hull City	A	6,168	McParland
6	16.09.89	Hull City	0–1	Leeds United	H	11,620	
7	23.09.89	Sheffield United	0–0	Hull City	A	14,969	
8	27.09.89	Middlesbrough	1–0	Hull City	A	16,382	
9	30.09.89	Hull City	1–3	Newcastle United	H	9,629	McParland
10	07.10.89	Hull City	2–3	Swindon Town	H	5,366	Swan (2)
11	14.10.89	Stoke City	1–1	Hull City	A	9,955	McParland
12	17.10.89	Hull City	0–0	Oldham Athletic	H	5,109	
13	21.10.89	West Bromwich Albion	1–1	Hull City	A	9,228	Brown
14	28.10.89	Hull City	0–2	Brighton & Hove Albion	H	4,756	
15	31.10.89	Blackburn Rovers	0–0	Hull City	A	7,456	
16	04.11.89	Hull City	0–0	Watford	H	4,718	
17	11.11.89	Bradford City	2–3	Hull City	A	8,540	Jobson, Payton, McParland
18	18.11.89	Oxford United	0–0	Hull City	A	4,029	
19	25.11.89	Hull City	1–2	Barnsley	H	5,715	Payton
20	02.12.89	Leicester City	2–1	Hull City	A	8,616	Doyle
21	09.12.89	Hull City	2–1	Port Vale	H	4,207	Payton, Doyle
22	26.12.89	Wolverhampton Wanderers	1–2	Hull City	A	19,524	Brown, Terry
23	29.12.89	Plymouth Argyle	1–2	Hull City	A	8,588	Swan, Terry
24	01.01.90	Hull City	3–2	Sunderland	H	9,346	Payton, Jacobs, Swan
25	13.01.90	Hull City	1–4	Bournemouth	H	4,673	Payton
26	20.01.90	West Ham United	1–2	Hull City	A	16,847	Buckley, Payton
27	03.02.90	Hull City	0–0	Sheffield United	H	9,606	
28	10.02.90	Leeds United	4–3	Hull City	A	29,977	Payton (2), Doyle
29	17.02.90	Hull City	1–2	Portsmouth	H	4,883	Terry
30	24.02.90	Barnsley	1–1	Hull City	A	8,901	Jacobs
31	03.03.90	Hull City	1–0	Oxford United	H	4,503	Payton
32	07.03.90	Newcastle United	2–0	Hull City	A	20,684	
33	10.03.90	Hull City	0–0	Middlesbrough	H	6,602	
34	17.03.90	Swindon Town	1–3	Hull City	A	8,123	Askew, Payton, Bamber
35	20.03.90	Hull City	0–0	Stoke City	H	6,456	
36	24.03.90	Oldham Athletic	3–2	Hull City	A	11,472	Hunter, Jobson
37	31.03.90	Hull City	0–2	West Bromwich Albion	H	5,418	
38	06.04.90	Brighton & Hove Albion	2–0	Hull City	A	6,789	
39	10.04.90	Hull City	2–0	Blackburn Rovers	H	5,327	Payton, Bamber
40	14.04.90	Sunderland	0–1	Hull City	A	17,437	Swan
41	16.04.90	Hull City	2–0	Wolverhampton Wanderers	H	7,510	Palin, Bamber
42	21.04.90	Ipswich Town	0–1	Hull City	A	9,380	(o.g.)
43	24.03.90	Hull City	3–3	Plymouth Argyle	H	5,256	Swan, Shotton, Hunter
44	28.04.90	Hull City	2–1	Bradford City	H	6,514	Swan, Payton
45	01.05.90	Hull City	4–3	Ipswich Town	H	5,306	Swan, Shotton, Atkinson, Payton
46	05.05.90	Watford	3–1	Hull City	A	9,827	Hunter

=== FA Cup ===
==== Matches ====
Win Draw Loss

#	Date	Home	Result	Away	Venue	Att.	Scorers
3R	06.01.90	Hull City	0–1	Newcastle United	H	10,743	

=== League Cup ===
==== Matches ====
Win Draw Loss

#	Date	Home	Result	Away	Venue	Att.	Scorers
1R	22.08.89	Hull City	1–0	Grimsby Town	H	5,045	Payton
1R	29.08.89	Grimsby Town	2–0	Hull City	A	6,753	

=== Full Members' Cup ===
==== Matches ====
Win Draw Loss

#	Date	Home	Result	Away	Venue	Att.	Scorers
2R	28.11.89	Hull City	1–2	Aston Villa	H	2,888	Jenkinson

== Squad ==
Name	Position	Nationality	Place of birth	Date of birth (age) (Note: Players' ages listed as they were on 1 July 1989, the official start date of the 1989–90 season)	Previous club	Date signed	Fee
Goalkeepers
Iain Hesford	GK	ENG	(Northern Rhodesia) Ndola	4 March 1960 (age 29)	Sunderland	December 1988	Swap deal
Gavin Kelly	GK	ENG	Beverley	29 September 1968 (age 20)	Academy	March 1984	–
Defenders
Nicky Brown	DF	ENG	Hull	16 October 1966 (age 22)	Academy	September 1985	–
Neil Buckley	DF	ENG	Hull	25 September 1968 (age 20)	Academy	July 1985	–
Wayne Jacobs	DF	ENG	Sheffield	3 February 1969 (age 20)	Sheffield Wednesday	March 1988	Unknown
Richard Jobson	DF	ENG	Cottingham	9 May 1963 (age 26)	Watford	February 1985	£40,000
Paul Mudd	DF	ENG	Hull	13 November 1970 (age 18)	Academy	July 1988	–
Malcolm Murray	DF	SCO	Buckie	26 July 1964 (age 24)	(Scotland) Heart of Midlothian	March 1989	Unknown
Richard Shaw	DF	ENG	Brentford	11 September 1968 (age 20)	Crystal Palace	December 1989	Loan
Malcolm Shotton	DF	ENG	Newcastle	16 February 1957 (age 32)	Barnsley	February 1990	Unknown
Peter Swan	DF	ENG	Leeds	28 September 1966 (age 22)	Leeds United	March 1989	£200,000
Steve Terry	DF	ENG	Clapton	14 June 1962 (age 27)	Watford	June 1988	Unknown
Les Thompson	DF	ENG	Cleethorpes	23 September 1968 (age 20)	Grimsby Town	May 1987	Free
Lee Warren	DF	ENG	Manchester	28 February 1969 (age 20)	Rochdale	August 1988	Unknown
Midfielders
Billy Askew	MF	ENG	Great Lumley	2 October 1959 (age 29)	Middlesbrough	August 1982	Free
Graeme Atkinson	MF	ENG	Hull	11 November 1971 (age 17)	Academy	July 1989	–
Mark Calvert	MF	ENG	Consett	11 September 1970 (age 18)	Academy	July 1988	–
Ken DeMange	MF	IRL	Dublin	3 September 1964 (age 24)	Leeds United	March 1988	£65,000
Steve Doyle	MF	WAL	Neath	2 June 1958 (age 31)	Sunderland	August 1989	Unknown
Leigh Jenkinson	MF	ENG	Thorne	9 July 1969 (age 19)	Academy	July 1986	–
Harry Ngata	MF	NZL	Whanganui	24 August 1971 (age 17)	(New Zealand) Porirua Viard United	December 1987	Free
Leigh Palin	MF	ENG	Worcester	12 September 1965 (age 23)	Stoke City	March 1990	Unknown
Garreth Roberts	MF	ENG	Hull	15 November 1960 (age 28)	Academy	March 1979	–
Gwyn Thomas	MF	WAL	Swansea	26 September 1957 (age 31)	Barnsley	March 1990	£25,000
Paul Waites	MF	ENG	Hull	24 January 1971 (age 18)	Academy	May 1990	–
Paul Wheeler	MF	WAL	Caerphilly	3 January 1965 (age 24)	Cardiff City	November 1989	Free
Forwards
Dave Bamber	FW	ENG	Prescot	1 February 1959 (age 30)	Stoke City	February 1990	Unknown
Keith Edwards	FW	ENG	Stockton-on-Tees	16 July 1957 (age 31)	(Scotland) Aberdeen	March 1986	Unknown
Paul Hunter	FW	SCO	Kirkcaldy	30 August 1968 (age 20)	(Scotland) East Fife	March 1990	£150,000
Ian McParland	FW	SCO	Edinburgh	4 October 1961 (age 27)	Notts County	March 1989	Unknown
Andy Payton	FW	ENG	Whalley	23 October 1967 (age 21)	Burnley	July 1985	Free
Mike Smith	FW	ENG	Hull	19 December 1968 (age 20)	Academy	May 1987	–
Billy Whitehurst	FW	ENG	Thurnscoe	10 June 1959 (age 30)	Sunderland	December 1988	Swap deal
