= 2003–04 Bradford City A.F.C. season =

Bradford City
2003–04 season
- Chairman: Gordon Gibb (until 9 January); Julian Rhodes
- Manager: Nicky Law (until 8 November); Peter Atherton, Wayne Jacobs, David Wetherall, and Dean Windass (joint caretaker managers); Bryan Robson (from 24 November)
- First Division: 23rd (relegated)
- FA Cup: Third round
- League Cup: First round
- Top goalscorer: League: Michael Branch/Dean Windass (6); All: Michael Branch/Andy Gray/Dean Windass (7)

During the 2003–04 season, Bradford City participated in the Football League First Division.

== Season summary ==
Bradford City were relegated from the First Division after 3 seasons in the division. Manager Bryan Robson left at the end of the season, and was replaced by his assistant Colin Todd.

Defender Paul Heckingbottom was the club's player of the year.

== League table ==
Pos	Team	Pld	W	D	L	GF	GA	GD	Pts	Promotion, qualification or relegation
20	Derby County	46	13	13	20	53	67	−14	52	
21	Gillingham	46	14	9	23	48	67	−19	51	
22	Walsall (R)	46	13	12	21	45	65	−20	51	Relegation to Football League One
23	Bradford City (R)	46	10	6	30	38	69	−31	36	Relegation to Football League One
24	Wimbledon (R)	46	8	5	33	41	89	−48	29	Renamed Milton Keynes Dons in Football League One

Source: Soccerway
Rules for classification: 1) points; 2) goal difference; 3) number of goals scored.
(R) Relegated

== Kit ==
Bradford's kits were manufactured by Italian company Diadora and sponsored by Bradford-based car dealership JCT600.

== First-team squad ==
Squad at end of season

Note: Flags indicate national team as defined under FIFA eligibility rules; some limited exceptions apply. Players may hold more than one non-FIFA nationality.

No.	Pos.	Nation	Player
1	GK	(Scotland) SCO	Alan Combe
2	DF	(England) ENG	Peter Atherton
3	DF	(England) ENG	Paul Heckingbottom
4	MF	(England) ENG	Tom Kearney
5	DF	(England) ENG	David Wetherall
6	DF	(England) ENG	Mark Bower
8	FW	(England) ENG	Michael Branch
9	MF	(England) ENG	Nicky Summerbee
10	FW	(England) ENG	Dean Windass
12	FW	(England) ENG	Danny Cadamarteri
13	GK	(New Zealand) NZL	Mark Paston
16	DF	(England) ENG	Lewis Emanuel
17	DF	(Republic of Ireland) IRL	Jason Gavin

No.	Pos.	Nation	Player
18	MF	(England) ENG	Ben Muirhead
19	DF	(Australia) AUS	Gareth Edds
20	MF	(England) ENG	Rob Wolleaston
21	FW	(England) ENG	Danny Forrest
22	DF	(England) ENG	Wayne Jacobs
25	MF	(England) ENG	Michael Standing
26	FW	(England) ENG	Patrick Bannister
27	FW	(England) ENG	Kevin Sanasy
28	DF	(England) ENG	Peter Folkes
30	GK	(England) ENG	Aaron O'Malley
31	MF	(England) ENG	Tom Penford
36	GK	(England) ENG	Andy Rhodes
40	GK	(Australia) AUS	Clint Davies

=== Left club during season ===
Note: Flags indicate national team as defined under FIFA eligibility rules; some limited exceptions apply. Players may hold more than one non-FIFA nationality.

No.	Pos.	Nation	Player
7	MF	(Wales) WAL	Paul Evans (to Nottingham Forest)
11	FW	(Scotland) SCO	Andy Gray (to Sheffield United)
14	FW	(England) ENG	Luke Cornwall (to Woking)
15	DF	(England) ENG	Simon Francis (to Sheffield United)
23	MF	(England) ENG	Frazer McHugh (to Notts County)
24	MF	(Australia) AUS	Paul Reid (to Brighton & Hove Albion)

No.	Pos.	Nation	Player
29	GK	(England) ENG	Marlon Beresford (to Luton Town)
32	MF	(Republic of Ireland) IRL	Gareth Farrelly (on loan from Bolton Wanderers)
33	FW	(England) ENG	Alun Armstrong (on loan from Ipswich Town)
34	DF	(England) ENG	Ronnie Wallwork (on loan from West Bromwich Albion)
35	GK	(Belgium) BEL	Nico Vaesen (on loan from Birmingham City)

== Transfers ==
=== In ===
- Paul Heckingbottom - Norwich City, July, free
- Michael Branch - Wolves, free
