= 2002–03 Bradford City A.F.C. season =

Bradford City
2002–03 season
- Chairman: Gordon Gibb
- Manager: Nicky Law
- Stadium: Valley Parade
- First Division: 19th
- FA Cup: Third round
- League Cup: First round
- Top goalscorer: League: Andy Gray (15); All: Andy Gray (15)
- Highest home attendance: 19,088 (vs. Portsmouth, 4 May)
- Lowest home attendance: 10,615 (vs. Wimbledon, 9 November)
- Average home league attendance: 12,500

During the 2002–03 English football season, Bradford City competed in the Football League First Division.

== Season summary ==
Just after the end of the previous season, Bradford had been placed into administration, as a result of the collapse of ITV Digital, "six weeks of madness" in the transfer market in 2000 and the collapse of the sale of Benito Carbone (on weekly wages of £40,000) to Middlesbrough. The only way for Bradford, £13 million into debt, to move forward was to going into administration to try and save the club and find a buyer. Cuts had to be made, the most drastic being the cancelling of the contracts of sixteen members of the professional squad, leaving manager Nicky Law with five professionals with a handful of senior appearances among them and sixteen scholars.

After a summer of uncertainty, on 1 August the administrators managed to get creditors to accept a Creditors Voluntary Agreement, which would reschedule debts and reinstate the players, who had gone unpaid since April. One player not to return was Benito Carbone, who sacrificed a large chunk of the money owed to him on his contract and moved back to Italy. Chairman Richmond resigned from the board of directors on 10 August, after a reign of eight years. He was replaced as chairman by theme park magnate and new co-owner Gordon Gibb, who, along with Julian Rhodes, had completed a take-over of the club at the 11th hour before Bradford were due to lose their Football League status.

On 30 August, agreement was finally reached with the Professional Footballers' Association over payment owed to the players. With agreement having already been made with the creditors, this now allowed the Football League to return Bradford City's share in the League, effectively bringing the club out of administration.

With a transfer embargo in place, manager Nicky Law had to show an eye for a bargain and unearthed some raw talent. Youngsters Danny Forrest and Simon Francis emerged while Law worked the loan system to cope with an horrific list of injuries.

Bradford eventually finished the season in 19th place; given all that had happened off the field, this was to be considered a success.

Claus Jorgensen scored in eight consecutive away matches.

== Final league table ==
Pos	Team	Pld	W	D	L	GF	GA	GD	Pts
17	Walsall	46	15	9	22	57	69	−12	54
18	Derby County	46	15	7	24	55	74	−19	52
19	Bradford City	46	14	10	22	51	73	−22	52
20	Coventry City	46	12	14	20	46	62	−16	50
21	Stoke City	46	12	14	20	45	69	−24	50

Updated to match(es) played on 11 May 2003. Source: Soccerway
Rules for classification: 1) points; 2) goal difference; 3) number of goals scored.

== Results ==
Bradford City's score comes first

=== Legend ===
Win	Draw	Loss

=== Football League First Division ===
Date	Opponent	Venue	Result	Attendance	Scorers
11 August 2002	Wolverhampton Wanderers	H	0–0	13,223	
13 August 2002	Crystal Palace	A	1–1	15,205	Tod
17 August 2002	Stoke City	A	1–2	12,424	Gray
24 August 2002	Grimsby Town	H	0–0	10,914	
26 August 2002	Ipswich Town	A	2–1	25,457	Evans, Proctor
31 August 2002	Rotherham United	H	4–2	12,385	Ward (2), Uhlenbeek, Proctor
14 September 2002	Walsall	A	1–0	4,678	Gray
17 September 2002	Leicester City	A	0–4	24,651	
21 September 2002	Burnley	H	2–2	14,561	Gray, Proctor
24 September 2002	Coventry City	H	1–1	11,655	Evans
28 September 2002	Portsmouth	A	0–3	18,459	
5 October 2002	Preston North End	H	1–1	13,215	Proctor
12 October 2002	Derby County	H	0–0	13,385	
19 October 2002	Sheffield Wednesday	A	1–2	17,191	Warnock
26 October 2002	Norwich City	H	2–1	12,888	Reid (2)
29 October 2002	Reading	A	0–1	12,110	
2 November 2002	Brighton & Hove Albion	A	2–3	6,319	Gray (2, 1 pen)
9 November 2002	Wimbledon	H	3–5	10,615	Facey, Standing (2)
16 November 2002	Nottingham Forest	A	0–3	19,653	
23 November 2002	Sheffield United	H	0–5	13,364	
30 November 2002	Millwall	A	0–1	8,510	
7 December 2002	Gillingham	H	1–3	10,711	Gray
14 December 2002	Nottingham Forest	H	1–0	12,245	Molenaar
21 December 2002	Watford	A	0–1	12,579	
26 December 2002	Stoke City	H	4–2	14,575	Gray (2, 1 pen), Handyside (own goal), Jørgensen
28 December 2002	Wolverhampton Wanderers	A	2–1	25,812	Jørgensen, Gray
18 January 2003	Rotherham United	A	2–3	6,939	Jørgensen, Gray (pen)
25 January 2003	Grimsby Town	A	2–1	5,582	Gray, Jørgensen
1 February 2003	Ipswich Town	H	2–0	12,080	Jørgensen, Forrest
8 February 2003	Wimbledon	A	2–2	1,178	Jørgensen, Ward
15 February 2003	Brighton & Hove Albion	H	0–1	11,520	
22 February 2003	Coventry City	A	2–0	12,525	Gray, Jørgensen
1 March 2003	Walsall	H	1–2	10,893	Forrest
4 March 2003	Leicester City	H	0–0	11,531	
8 March 2003	Crystal Palace	H	2–1	11,016	Atherton, Francis
15 March 2003	Derby County	A	2–1	23,735	Jørgensen, Lawrence
18 March 2003	Sheffield Wednesday	H	1–1	14,452	Gray (pen)
22 March 2003	Reading	H	0–1	11,385	
25 March 2003	Burnley	A	2–0	11,095	Jørgensen, Gray
29 March 2003	Norwich City	A	2–3	18,536	Forrest, Jørgensen (pen)
5 April 2003	Millwall	H	0–1	10,676	
19 April 2003	Watford	H	2–1	11,145	Jørgensen, Gray (pen)
21 April 2003	Gillingham	A	0–1	6,281	
26 April 2003	Preston North End	A	0–1	13,652	
29 April 2003	Sheffield United	A	0–3	18,297	
4 May 2003	Portsmouth	H	0–5	19,088	

=== FA Cup ===
Round	Date	Opponent	Venue	Result	Attendance	Goalscorers
R3	4 January 2003	West Bromwich Albion	A	1–3	19,909	Danks

=== League Cup ===
Round	Date	Opponent	Venue	Result	Attendance	Goalscorers
R1	10 September 2002	Wrexham	A	1–2	2,232	Cadamarteri

== First-team squad ==
Note: Flags indicate national team as defined under FIFA eligibility rules; some limited exceptions apply. Players may hold more than one non-FIFA nationality.

No.	Pos.	Nation	Player
1	GK	(England) ENG	Gary Walsh
2	DF	(England) ENG	Peter Atherton
3	DF	(England) ENG	Andy Myers
4	MF	(England) ENG	Tom Kearney
5	DF	(England) ENG	David Wetherall (captain)
6	DF	(England) ENG	Mark Bower
8	FW	(England) ENG	Danny Cadamarteri
9	FW	(England) ENG	Ashley Ward
10	MF	(Wales) WAL	Paul Evans
11	FW	(Scotland) SCO	Andy Gray
12	DF	(Netherlands) NED	Robert Molenaar
14	DF	(Suriname) SUR	Gus Uhlenbeek
15	MF	(Spain) ESP	Juanjo
16	MF	(England) ENG	Michael Standing
17	GK	(Northern Ireland) NIR	Aidan Davison

No.	Pos.	Nation	Player
18	DF	(England) ENG	Lewis Emanuel
19	MF	(Faroe Islands) FRO	Claus Bech Jørgensen
20	DF	(Scotland) SCO	Andy Tod
21	MF	(England) ENG	Andy Lee
22	DF	(England) ENG	Wayne Jacobs
24	MF	(Australia) AUS	Paul Reid
34	DF	(England) ENG	Simon Francis
35	FW	(England) ENG	Mark Danks
38	FW	(England) ENG	Danny Forrest
39	FW	(England) ENG	Kevin Sanasy
41	MF	(England) ENG	Tom Penford
43	FW	(England) ENG	Ben Muirhead
45	FW	(Netherlands) NED	Laurens ten Heuvel (on loan from Sheffield United)

=== Left club during season ===
Note: Flags indicate national team as defined under FIFA eligibility rules; some limited exceptions apply. Players may hold more than one non-FIFA nationality.

No.	Pos.	Nation	Player
7	MF	(Jamaica) JAM	Jamie Lawrence (to Walsall)
10	FW	(Italy) ITA	Benito Carbone (to Como)
11	MF	(Scotland) SCO	Eoin Jess (to Nottingham Forest)
13	GK	(England) ENG	Steve Banks (on loan from Bolton Wanderers)
14	MF	(Scotland) SCO	Gary Locke (to Kilmarnock)
23	FW	(England) ENG	Michael Proctor (on loan from Sunderland)
25	DF	(England) ENG	Stephen Warnock (on loan from Liverpool)

No.	Pos.	Nation	Player
26	GK	(England) ENG	Dave Beasant (to Wigan Athletic)
27	MF	(England) ENG	Harpal Singh (on loan from Leeds United)
28	FW	(Grenada) GRN	Delroy Facey (on loan from Bolton Wanderers)
29	GK	(Wales) WAL	Boaz Myhill (on loan from Aston Villa)
34	FW	(England) ENG	Damian Hatton (retired)
37	FW	(England) ENG	Graeme Tomlinson (to Bedford Town)
42	GK	(England) ENG	Neil Bennett (to Rochdale)

== Reserve squad ==
Note: Flags indicate national team as defined under FIFA eligibility rules; some limited exceptions apply. Players may hold more than one non-FIFA nationality.

No.	Pos.	Nation	Player
31	MF	(England) ENG	Craig Fishlock
32	DF	(England) ENG	Robert Morgan
33	DF	(England) ENG	Keith Brodie

No.	Pos.	Nation	Player
36	GK	(England) ENG	Nicky Beach
40	FW	(England) ENG	Daniel Ekoku
44	DF	(England) ENG	Frazer McHugh
46	DF	(England) ENG	Jake Wright

== Transfers ==
=== In ===
- Steve Banks - Bolton Wanderers, loan
- Andy Gray - Nottingham Forest
- Michael Proctor - Sunderland, loan
- Harpal Singh - Leeds United, loan
- Stephen Warnock - Liverpool, loan
- Delroy Facey - Bolton Wanderers, loan
- Boaz Myhill - Aston Villa, loan

=== Out ===
- Jamie Lawrence - Walsall
- Benito Carbone - Como
- Eoin Jess - Nottingham Forest
- Gary Locke - Kilmarnock
- Dave Beasant - Wigan Athletic
- Damian Hatton - retired
- Graeme Tomlinson - Bedford Town
- Neil Bennett - Rochdale
