= Michael Standing =

Michael Standing may refer to:

- Michael Standing (footballer) (born 1981), English footballer
- Michael Standing (actor) (born 1939), English actor of the 1960s and early 1970s
