= Wayne Jacobs =

English footballer (born 1969)

Personal information
- Full name: Wayne Graham Jacobs
- Date of birth: 3 February 1969 (age 57)
- Place of birth: Sheffield, England
- Height: 5 ft 8 in (1.73 m)
- Position: Left back

Youth career
- 1983–1987: Sheffield Wednesday

Senior career*
Years	Team	Apps	(Gls)
1987–1988	Sheffield Wednesday	6	(0)
1988–1992	Hull City	129	(4)
1993–1994	Rotherham United	42	(2)
1994–2005	Bradford City	318	(12)
2005–2006	Halifax Town	11	(0)
Total		505	(18)

Managerial career
- 2003: Bradford City (joint-caretaker)
- 2010: Bradford City (caretaker)
- * Club domestic league appearances and goals

Wayne Graham Jacobs (born 3 February 1969) is an English football coach and former professional player. He also operates a charity called One In A Million, which he set up after turning to Christianity.

Jacobs was a tenacious left back who began his playing career with Sheffield Wednesday, where he would play six First Division games in the 1987–88 season. He was sold to Hull City for a £30,000 fee in March 1988 and would go on to win the club's Player of the Year award. He suffered serious injuries, however, and was released in December 1992. He returned to fitness and spent the 1993–94 season with Rotherham United before he joined Bradford City in August 1994. He spent the next 11 years with Bradford, helping the club to win promotion out of the Second Division via the play-offs in 1996 and then to win promotion into the Premier League at the end of the 1998–99 season. He was twice named the club's Player of the Year and made 357 appearances, including 45 in the Premier League, before he departed into non-League football in May 2005.

He spent two years as the assistant manager at Halifax Town. He returned to Bradford City, serving as caretaker manager in February 2010, adding to his first spell as caretaker manager in November 2003. He later worked as an assistant to Darren Moore at West Bromwich Albion, Sheffield Wednesday, and Port Vale.

== Playing career ==
=== Sheffield Wednesday ===
Jacobs joined Sheffield Wednesday on schoolboy terms upon turning 14. He made his debut in the Football League for Sheffield Wednesday on 18 August 1987, when he came on as a substitute in a 1–1 draw with Oxford United at Hillsborough. He was given his first start in the First Division on 19 September in a 2–2 draw at Derby County. He played ten games in the 1987–88 season, featuring in a variety of positions from left-back and right-back to left-midfield and left-wing. He later credited "very strong and sergeant majori-sh" manager Howard Wilkinson for instilling him with the discipline needed for a good career in the game.

=== Hull City ===
Jacobs signed a two-year contract with Hull City after being bought for a £30,000 fee on 25 March 1988. Keith Edwards also arrived on the same day, the last day of the transfer window. Jacobs saw the step down to the Second Division as a chance to establish himself in the first XI at a club. He was credited with being "one of Brian Horton's many bargain buys". He competed with Ray Daniel for the left-back berth in the 1988–89 campaign. After initially rotating the pair, manager Eddie Gray settled on Jacobs as his first-choice left-back from January. Jacobs finished as runner-up to Keith Edwards in the fans' Player of the Year vote and was named as the Away Match Player of the Year. He scored his first goal in senior football on 2 December 1989 in a 2–1 defeat at Leicester City. He was voted as club's Player of the Year after being an ever-present throughout the 1989–90 campaign. The club was in a state of flux as Colin Appleton was sacked three months into the season, to be replaced by Stan Ternent. However, Jacobs retained his first-team place throughout. He signed a new three-year contract.

A persistent ankle ligament injury limited him to 19 league appearances in the 1990–91 campaign as Hull were relegated into the Third Division. He was deputised by Les Thompson during his absences from the team. He featured 34 times under the stewardship of Terry Dolan in the 1991–92 campaign before he snapped a cruciate ligament in a game against Stoke City in January. He returned to fitness towards the end of the 1992–93 season, having missed 14 months with a cruciate knee ligament. However, he was released by chairman Martin Fish on Christmas Eve after Fish claimed the club could not pay his wages. Shareholders criticised Fish for what they perceived to be his short-sighted decision at the club's AGM. Fish said Jacobs was a potential "financial liability" and that he expected "to take some stick" for his decision.

=== Rotherham United ===
Jacobs signed with Second Division club Rotherham United on 2 July 1993. He was sent off for the first time in his career during a 1–0 defeat at Cardiff City on 29 March 1994, having received a second yellow card for tugging Tony Bird's shirt. He proved his fitness to manager Phil Henson by missing just four league games of the 1993–94 season. Despite this, he was still allowed to leave Millmoor.

=== Bradford City ===
Jacobs remained in the Second Division as he signed with Bradford City on 5 August 1994. He played 44 games in the 1994–95 season and was named as the club's Player of the Year. In December 1995, Jacobs scored two goals, including one from a bicycle kick, in an FA Cup win over Preston North End in a match shown live on television amidst a thick fog. Chris Kamara succeeded Lennie Lawrence as manager midway through the 1995–96 campaign and led Bradford into the play-offs with victory over Jacobs' former club Hull at Boothferry Park on the final day. City then came back from a 2–0 home defeat by Blackpool in the first leg of the play-off semi-finals to win 3–0 and secure a place in the play-off final, with Jacobs recalling an arrogant boast from a Blackpool player after the first leg being his motivation for the second leg. Jacobs then played in the play-off final victory over Notts County after having prayed on the pitch at Wembley Stadium alongside teammates Richard Huxford and Andy Kiwomya before the game.

He was sidelined for six weeks with a fractured cheekbone in November 1996. He recovered and was again named as the club's Player of the Year at the end of the 1996–97 season. He made 39 appearances in the 1997–98 campaign. He was linked with a move to Stockport County in September 1998 with Gary Megson needing a replacement for Damon Searle; Bradford valued Jacobs at £150,000. He remained with Bradford, however, and was a key member of Paul Jewell's squad as Bradford secured promotion into the Premier League at the end of the 1998–99 season.

With the club now in the top-flight, Andy Myers was signed from Chelsea to play at left-back. Jacobs was transfer-listed in August 1999, alongside Robbie Blake and Darren Moore. He entered talks with Birmingham City the following month. He was frozen out of the team by December following a contract dispute. However, he featured in 24 of the club's 38 league games and was a late substitute on the final day of the 1999–2000 season as Bradford escaped relegation by beating Liverpool 1–0 at Valley Parade. He played in European competition for the first time in the 2000 UEFA Intertoto Cup, featuring in both legs of the second round victory over Lithuanian club FK Atlantas. He admitted that many of the players were "scratching their heads a bit" as they faced the new challenge of playing European football. He competed with Ian Nolan and played 20 Premier League games under Chris Hutchings and Jim Jefferies as Bradford were relegated in last place at the end of the 2000–01 season.

He played 40 games in the 2001–02 season, scoring his final career goal in a 1–1 draw at former club Rotherham United. He received the second red card of his career during a 1–0 defeat at Millwall on 30 November 2002. Manager Nicky Law blamed the match officials for not spotting the ball crossing the touchline before Jacobs made the challenge that earned him the second yellow card. Jacobs played 24 times in the 2002–03 season. Following Law's sacking, Moore served as joint-caretaker manager for a 1–0 defeat at Stoke City on 22 November 2003. When Bryan Robson was appointed as manager two days later, Jacobs said that his mere presence at the club "has already given everyone a boost". However, results did not improve and Bradford were relegated at the end of the 2003–04 season. He featured in 14 League One games under Colin Todd in the 2004–05 campaign, taking his final tally to the club to 357 league and cup appearances.

=== Halifax Town ===
Jacobs signed with Conference National club Halifax Town on 31 May 2005. His main function at The Shay, however, was to assist manager Chris Wilder.

== Style of play ==
Jacobs was a left back with speed, skill and tenacity.

== Coaching career ==
In June 2007, Jacobs returned to Bradford City as assistant manager under Stuart McCall. On 8 February 2010, he took over as manager in a temporary capacity when McCall departed. He again was an assistant to new manager Peter Taylor, but was put on gardening leave in February 2011, following Taylor's departure. Following the appointment of Darren Moore as caretaker head coach at West Bromwich Albion, Jacobs was given a temporary position on the club's coaching staff in April 2018. After Moore was given the job full-time, Jacobs was appointed second assistant head coach in September 2018, serving alongside first assistant head coach Graeme Jones. On 9 March 2019, Moore was sacked as manager and Jacobs left together with him.

In March 2022, Jacobs joined Sheffield Wednesday to work alongside Jamie Smith as an assistant to manager Darren Moore. He stepped back from the role on a full-time basis early in the 2022–23 season to concentrate on his charity work. He left the club completely on 19 June 2023, with Moore and the rest of his backroom staff. Jacobs joined Moore as his assistant at Port Vale in February 2024. He was reported to be off work in February 2025 due to health-related reasons as Moore stated that he was on a "slow but sure road getting back to full fitness". He left the club after the 2024–25 promotion season as he continued his recovery from health issues.

== Personal life ==
In November 1988, Jacobs and an accomplice pleaded guilty to a charge of assault following an altercation with a 60-year-old man at a hotel in Attercliffe; he was fined £500 and ordered to pay £650 in compensation. He became a committed Christian during his time spent struggling with injury at Hull City. He later said that his personal life was a mess before he found religion and that he would have been "dead by 30, or in prison" without football. His wife gave birth to a baby in October 1998.

Jacobs founded the charity One In A Million, which helps disadvantaged children in Bradford. The One in a Million charity also opened a free school in the city in September 2013. He worked his coaching career around his charity work. He has worked as a co-commentator for BBC Radio Leeds.

== Career statistics ==
=== Playing ===
Appearances and goals by club, season and competition
Club	Season	League			FA Cup		Other		Total	
Club	Season	Division	Apps	Goals	Apps	Goals	Apps	Goals	Apps	Goals
Sheffield Wednesday	1987–88	First Division	6	0	0	0	4	0	10	0
Hull City	1987–88	Second Division	6	0	0	0	0	0	6	0
Hull City	1988–89	Second Division	33	0	3	0	2	0	38	0
Hull City	1989–90	Second Division	46	3	1	0	3	0	50	3
Hull City	1990–91	Second Division	19	1	1	0	2	0	22	1
Hull City	1991–92	Third Division	25	0	3	0	6	0	34	0
Hull City	1992–93	Third Division	0	0	0	0	0	0	0	0
Hull City	Total		129	4	8	0	13	0	150	4
Rotherham United	1993–94	Second Division	42	2	1	0	6	0	49	2
Bradford City	1994–95	Second Division	38	1	1	0	5	0	44	1
Bradford City	1995–96	Second Division	28	0	3	2	8	0	39	2
Bradford City	1996–97	First Division	39	3	3	0	1	0	43	3
Bradford City	1997–98	First Division	36	2	1	0	2	0	39	2
Bradford City	1998–99	First Division	44	3	2	0	3	0	49	3
Bradford City	1999–2000	Premier League	24	0	0	0	2	0	26	0
Bradford City	2000–01	Premier League	21	2	1	0	4	0	26	2
Bradford City	2001–02	First Division	38	1	1	0	1	0	40	1
Bradford City	2002–03	First Division	23	0	1	0	0	0	24	0
Bradford City	2003–04	First Division	13	0	0	0	0	0	13	0
Bradford City	2004–05	League One	14	0	0	0	0	0	14	0
Bradford City	Total		318	12	13	2	26	0	357	14
Halifax Town	2005–06	Conference National	11	0	0	0	1	0	12	0
Career total			506	18	22	2	50	0	578	20

=== Managerial ===
As of match played 13 February 2010

Managerial record by team and tenure
Team	From	To	Record					Ref.
Team	From	To	P	W	D	L	Win %	Ref.
Bradford City (joint-caretaker)	9 November 2003	24 November 2003	1	0	0	1	0.00	
Bradford City (caretaker)	8 February 2010	17 February 2010	1	0	1	0	0.00	
Total			2	0	1	1	0.00	

== Honours ==
Bradford City

- Football League Second Division play-offs: 1996
- Football League First Division second-place promotion: 1998–99

Individual

- Hull City Player of the Year: 1989–90
- Bradford City Player of the Year: 1994–95, 1996–97
