= 2004–05 Bradford City A.F.C. season =

Bradford City
2004–05 season
- Chairman: Julian Rhodes
- Manager: Colin Todd
- League One: 11th
- FA Cup: First round
- League Cup: First round
- Football League Trophy: First round
- Top goalscorer: Dean Windass (27)

During the 2004–05 season, Bradford City participated in Football League One.

== Season summary ==
Despite the 27 goals of League One's joint top scorer Dean Windass, Bradford finished in 9th, 6 points off the playoffs. The club was poor in the cups, exiting at the first round of all 3 cup competitions they entered.

== League table ==
Pos	Team	Pld	W	D	L	GF	GA	GD	Pts
9	Huddersfield Town	46	20	10	16	74	65	+9	70
10	Doncaster Rovers	46	16	18	12	65	60	+5	66
11	Bradford City	46	17	14	15	64	62	+2	65
12	Swindon Town	46	17	12	17	66	68	−2	63
13	Barnsley	46	14	19	13	69	64	+5	61

Updated to match(es) played on May 2005. Source:
Rules for classification: 1) points; 2) goal difference; 3) number of goals scored.

== Kit ==
Initially, Bradford City's kit for the season was manufactured by Diadora. From October onwards, Surridge was the manufacturer. Car dealership JCT600 remained the kit sponsor.

== Players ==
=== First-team squad ===
Squad at end of season

Note: Flags indicate national team as defined under FIFA eligibility rules; some limited exceptions apply. Players may hold more than one non-FIFA nationality.

No.	Pos.	Nation	Player
1	GK	(Jamaica) JAM	Donovan Ricketts (on loan from Bolton Wanderers)
3	DF	(Republic of Ireland) IRL	Paul Tierney (Note: Tierney was born in Salford, England, but also qualified to represent the Republic of Ireland internationally and represented them at U-21 level.) (on loan from Manchester United)
4	MF	(England) ENG	Tom Kearney
5	DF	(England) ENG	David Wetherall
6	DF	(England) ENG	Mark Bower
7	MF	(England) ENG	Steven Schumacher
8	FW	(England) ENG	Michael Symes
9	MF	(England) ENG	Nicky Summerbee
10	FW	(England) ENG	Dean Windass
11	MF	(Northern Ireland) NIR	Owen Morrison
12	DF	(England) ENG	Lee Crooks
13	GK	(Australia) AUS	Paul Henderson
14	DF	(England) ENG	Darren Holloway
15	MF	(England) ENG	Ben Muirhead
16	DF	(England) ENG	Lewis Emanuel (Note: Emanuel was born in Bradford, England, but also qualified to represent the Republic of Ireland internationally and would go on to represent the Republic of Ireland B team.)

No.	Pos.	Nation	Player
18	MF	(England) ENG	Tom Penford
20	FW	(England) ENG	Kevin Sanasy
21	FW	(England) ENG	Danny Forrest
22	DF	(England) ENG	Wayne Jacobs
24	MF	(England) ENG	Liam Flynn
25	MF	(England) ENG	Craig Bentham
26	DF	(England) ENG	John Swift
27	DF	(England) ENG	Luke Richardson
28	MF	(England) ENG	Joe Colbeck
29	DF	(England) ENG	Sam Denton
31	MF	(England) ENG	Patrick McGuire
33	DF	(England) ENG	Jake Wright
34	FW	(England) ENG	Andy Cooke
35	DF	(England) ENG	Craig Armstrong
36	MF	(England) ENG	Marc Bridge-Wilkinson

=== Left club during season ===
Note: Flags indicate national team as defined under FIFA eligibility rules; some limited exceptions apply. Players may hold more than one non-FIFA nationality.

No.	Pos.	Nation	Player
2	DF	(England) ENG	Peter Atherton (released)
17	DF	(Republic of Ireland) IRL	Jason Gavin (to Shamrock Rovers)
19	FW	(Nigeria) NGA	Dele Adebola (on loan from Coventry City)

No.	Pos.	Nation	Player
23	FW	(Wales) WAL	Neil Roberts (on loan from Wigan Athletic)
30	GK	(England) ENG	Ross Turnbull (on loan from Middlesbrough)
32	FW	(England) ENG	Zema Abbey (released)
