= Peter Swan (footballer, born 1966) =

English footballer

Personal information
- Full name: Peter Harold Swan
- Date of birth: 28 September 1966 (age 60)
- Place of birth: Leeds, England
- Height: 1.87 m (6 ft 2 in)
- Positions: Centre-half; centre-forward

Youth career
- 1980–1984: Leeds United

Senior career*
| Years | Team | Apps | (Gls) |
| 1984–1989 | Leeds United | 49 | (11) |
| 1989–1991 | Hull City | 80 | (24) |
| 1991–1994 | Port Vale | 111 | (6) |
| 1994–1995 | Plymouth Argyle | 27 | (2) |
| 1995–1997 | Burnley | 49 | (7) |
| 1997–1998 | Bury | 37 | (6) |
| 1998–2000 | Burnley (Note: An error at Soccerbase has meant that Swan's statistics at Burnley between August 1995 and August 1997 [49 league apps, 7 goals; 3 FA Cup apps; 2 League Cup apps; and 6 other apps] are duplicated in the statistics listed for his second spell at the club from August 1998 to March 2000. This error is duplicated in Swan's autobiography, which summarises his career as "16 years, 7 clubs and 503 senior games...") | 19 | (0) |
| 2000 | York City | 11 | (0) |
| Total | | 383 | (56) |
- * Club domestic league appearances and goals

Peter Harold Swan (born 28 September 1966) is an English former footballer who played as a defender and centre forward. In a 16-year professional career in the English Football League, he scored 62 goals in 445 games.

He began his career with local side Leeds United in 1984 before he moved on to Hull City for £200,000 in 1989. Two years later, he transferred to Port Vale for a fee of £300,000. He spent three years with Vale before being sold to Plymouth Argyle for the same price. During his time at Vale Park he was selected in the PFA's Second Division team of the season in 1992–93, before he won promotion out of the division in 1993–94; he also won the TNT Tournament in 1992 and the Football League Trophy in 1993 with the club. However, at Plymouth, he failed to succeed and was transferred to Burnley for £200,000 after just twelve months. In 1997, he signed with Bury for £50,000 before he returned to Burnley as a free transfer signing the following year. In 2000, he joined York City before he retired later in the year.

== Early life ==
Born in Leeds, he grew up in a newsagents with his sisters Janice and Diane. England and Great Britain rugby league footballer Harry Wilson was a great-grandfather of his through his father's side. Swan supported West Ham United as a boy.

As a child, he played alongside Don Goodman for a local youth side. When Swan moved up into Belle Isle Middle School, staff member John Bateman spotted his talent and recommended him to Yorkshire Amateurs. He later played for Leeds City Boys, the area's top junior side, where he once came up against John Beresford, who would become his close friend.

In September 1980, Leeds United chief scout Geoff Saunders signed Swan up as a schoolboy for £25 a week.

== Career ==
=== Leeds United ===
Swan turned professional with Leeds United in August 1984, having impressed those at the club so much as to earn comparisons to John Charles. Gary Speed was his boot boy. He was not utilised by Eddie Gray, but instead made his debut as a forward under Billy Bremner on 14 October 1985, in a Full Members Cup defeat to Manchester City at Maine Road. He won his first Football League start on 1 January 1986, playing alongside Neil Aspin in a Second Division fixture against Oldham Athletic. His first two senior goals came in a 4–0 win against Stoke City on 1 February, both were headers from John Stiles crosses. He finished the 1984–85 season with three goals in 16 games.

Leeds reached the semi-finals of the FA Cup in 1986–87; Swan played in the quarter-final victory over Wigan Athletic but missed the semi-final defeat to Coventry City at Hillsborough with a knee injury. After Leeds posted a fourth-place finish in the league, his teammates then went on to lose to Charlton Athletic in the play-off final – Swan missed the game due to his knee injury – this would be as close as Swan would get to reaching the top-flight of English football.

For the 1987–88 season, he shared a room with David Batty. Swan also set up the first of Batty's four Leeds goals in a boxing day clash with Manchester City at Maine Road. Though he was never consistently in the first XI under Bremner, when new manager Howard Wilkinson was appointed in 1988–89 Swan fell out of the first-team picture completely. He did not take to Wilkinson and ended his first-team chances at Leeds when he told Wilkinson's assistant, Mike Hennigan, that "I don't want to play for you... I just don't like him [Wilkinson]." Swan handed in seven written transfer requests in the first three months, though he was given two games before his request was granted.

=== Hull City ===
In March 1989, he was sold to Hull City for £200,000 (at the time a Hull record). This move reunited him with manager Eddie Gray. Leeds spent the money they received from the sale of Swan on bringing Gordon Strachan in from Manchester United. Leeds would go on to win the league title in 1991–92 under Wilkinson, with Strachan playing a large part in the success. However, Swan and Hull did not succeed; Gray used Swan in defence and lost his job in the summer following a run of just one win in twelve games.

New manager Colin Appleton used Swan in all four playing positions within the first 14 days of the 1989–90 campaign; his time in goal came when goalkeeper Iain Hesford was injured in a defeat to AFC Bournemouth and had to leave the field at half-time. Appleton failed to control his players, and with his team bottom of the division, he was sacked in October – much to the amusement of Swan and the team. His replacement Stan Ternent managed to instil the discipline necessary to get the best performances out of Swan and the other 'big characters' at the club. Ternent dragged Swan off just 15 minutes into his first match as manager but calmed the fury of his player when he explained the change was a tactical one. Ternent then put Swan up front with Andy Payton, and the pair put in a 28-goal haul in the league between them – with Swan claiming eleven of these despite missing 15 games with anterior cruciate ligament (ACL) damage in his knee. Following his recovery, Swan played in defence, and the "Tigers" managed to save their second-tier status and finish in mid-table.

The 1990–91 campaign was a disaster, and Hull suffered relegation after finishing in last place. Swan also suffered, as he played the game with Middlesbrough at Ayresome Park despite suffering from a painful heel injury, only to require stitches to his eye socket following a kick to the face from Simon Coleman; despite all of this Ternent still insisted that Swan got back on the field for the final 15 minutes of a 3–0 defeat. Swan went public with his desire to leave the club in November 1990 and handed in a transfer request after Ternent refused to use him as a defender rather than an attacker. Following Ternent's dismissal, new boss Terry Dolan agreed to let Swan go for a reasonable price, as he was aware that Swan was liable to "kick off a bit" if his requests were not granted, and Dolan was also in need of money to build a new team. Whilst waiting for an offer, he played Swan as a target man alongside strike partner Andy Payton; Swan scored 13 goals, and Payton scored twelve, though this was not enough to prevent the club from suffering relegation.

=== Port Vale ===
In the summer, four clubs chased Swan's signature in Sunderland, Bristol City, Wolverhampton Wanderers, and Port Vale. Eddie Gray was now working as Swan's agent, and he arranged a £300,000 move to John Rudge's Port Vale in August 1991, with a £52,500 signing on bonus for Swan in addition to his £650 a week wages and complimentary new car. Swan later revealed in his autobiography that he only passed his medical by concealing all evidence of the cruciate injury to his right knee. Rudge played Swan almost exclusively as a defender and never had significant problems with his knee but did have to issue many fines and 'bollockings' for the many practical jokes Swan would carry out. After recovering from a foot injury, Rudge played Swan in attack in a Football League Cup tie with Liverpool at Anfield, and Swan set up Martin Foyle for the "Valiants" equalising goal – despite his 'cross' being a miscued shot. The foot injury then turned out to be a stress fracture, and Swan was sidelined until Christmas. At the end of the season Vale were relegated to the third tier, and Swan was sent off for dissent in the defeat to Cambridge United that confirmed the club's relegation. He added to his inevitable fine from the club by continuing his verbal attack on the referee after the game, and following an investigation by the FA he continued to land himself in hot water with an elaborate practical joke he played on the FA officials who came to speak to Rudge at Vale Park.

A first-team regular alongside defensive partners Neil Aspin and Dean Glover, in the summer of 1992, he helped the club to win the pre-season TNT Tournament. His performances in the 1992–93 season saw him awarded a place on the PFA Second Division team. He was man of the match in the Football League Trophy final victory over Stockport County – despite suffering from a double hernia and being hungover from a secret boozing session the night before. The season finished on a negative note though, in the second half of the 1993 Second Division play-off final against West Bromwich Albion, with the game still goalless, Swan was sent off after bringing down Bob Taylor – who was through on goal. This proved to the turning point in the game as West Brom went on to win 3–0 to secure promotion at Vale's expense. It also meant that he went down in history as only the third Englishman to be sent off at Wembley, after Kevin Keegan and Lee Dixon.

Sidelined for a period, recovering from a hernia operation, Swan spent much of the 1993–94 pre-season making visits to the local children's hospital as he was moved by the patients he met there, particularly by a small girl called Lisa who died later that summer. Once he made it back onto the training field, he had a small fight with teammate Bernie Slaven, though rumours that spread through Stoke-on-Trent that this was due to him having an affair with Slaven's wife were false. As Rudge built a solid team, the club earned automatic promotion, with Swan being a vital contributor to this success. However, by October, Swan fancied a new club and challenge and handed in a transfer request. In July 1994 he was sold to Peter Shilton's Plymouth Argyle for a fee of £300,000, then a Plymouth record. This was despite Vale's valuation of £350,000 and reported interest from Burnley, and from First Division club's Bolton Wanderers, Leicester City, Notts County, and West Brom.

=== Plymouth Argyle ===
Swan's time on the South Coast was miserable: family dog Zee died; wife Bex had a difficult birth with baby George; and Swan became a hate figure with his teammates and the local population at large after the club suffered a poor start to the season. Swan's problems then took a supernatural bent as the young couple became convinced that their Plymouth home was haunted – the family moved 260 miles (420 km) back to the more friendly surroundings of Stoke. He got off on the wrong foot with the Argyle fans after the local media pointed out that his goal saving tackle at Vale Park on 19 February 1994 had cost Plymouth promotion (Vale had finished three points ahead of Plymouth, who lost out to Burnley in the playoffs); Shilton also did little to help Swan's cause by appointing him as captain at the expense of fan's favourite Steve Castle.

Swan's new teammates also resented the record-signing Northerner for intruding on their clique. Rudge offered Shilton £150,000 to bring Swan back to Vale Park but was refused; the local press asked Swan, "If you're so desperate to leave, why did you come to Plymouth in the first place?"; his answer of "For the money" only served to further incense supporters. Meanwhile, he had off-the-field scuffles with teammates Alan Nicholls and Kevin Nugent. Despite this, Swan's form on the pitch did improve towards the end of the season. Shilton was replaced by Steve McCall, who was in turn replaced by caretaker manager Russell Osman. However, to Swan's delight, neither man could steer the club away from relegation at the end of 1994–95.

=== Burnley ===
After the club withheld payment to Swan, the PFA put an embargo on the new manager Neil Warnock, though only after Swan began to disrupt training sessions did Warnock arrange a move to Second Division Burnley for £200,000. Swan stalled the move in anticipation of his missing wages from Plymouth and continued to disrupt pre-season friendlies when Warnock called him up due to a developing injury crisis; eventually he negotiated a settlement of £25,000. Burnley manager Jimmy Mullen got the sack after a poor start to 1995–96, and his replacement Adrian Heath was appointed in March 1996.

=== Bury ===
Swan had no respect for Heath and was not afraid to show it, so Heath kept Swan's appearances to a minimum in 1996–97. He offered loan moves to Third Division Hartlepool United and Hereford United, offers which Swan dismissed out of hand, and so Heath placed him on the transfer list. The transfer took until August 1997, at which point he moved on to Bury for a fee of £50,000 – this reunited him with manager Stan Ternent. The move had been delayed after Heath left Burnley to be replaced by Chris Waddle, though Waddle quickly sanctioned the transfer. Ternent moved Swan back to his role as a striker, despite the player having been used exclusively as a defender at his last few clubs. He scored six goals in his first twelve games before hitting a 15-game goal drought. He helped the club to narrowly avoid relegation at the end of the season.

=== Return to Burnley ===
Warnock replaced Ternent as Bury manager, and Ternent moved on to manage Burnley, signalling a return to Turf Moor for Swan. Ternent moved Swan back into defence but could only give him eleven starts and six substitute appearances following a combination of suspensions, illness and injury. A collision with Wycombe Wanderers' Jason Cousins on 20 February 1999 spelt the beginning of the end for Swan's career, as the result of a scan showed he had snapped the cruciate ligament in his right knee.

Ternent allowed Swan to play on a month-to-month contract for the 1999–2000 season. Swan rushed his nine-month recovery period down to seven months and was playing and living on painkillers. He secretly used suppositories to stop himself from passing blood after his stomach began rejecting the painkillers. Fighting a losing battle against injuries, in March 2000 Ternent allowed him to leave the club. Before he took the decision, Swan and Ronnie Jepson began to polish the boots of legendary new signing Ian Wright – just to be able to say they had done so. Five days after leaving Burnley he went to York City in the fourth tier. This reunited him with former manager Terry Dolan, who offered him a contract until the end of the season.

=== York City ===
Dolan gave him a contract for the 2000–01 season and appointed him as York's captain despite the concerns over his knee. Swan battled against his own body to play all the pre-season friendlies, including a clash with Manchester United and their star players of David Beckham, Roy Keane, Ryan Giggs, and Paul Scholes. He was sent off in the first game of the season after attempting to headbutt Chesterfield's Steve Blatherwick. He captained the "Minstermen" for the first and only time at Bootham Crescent against Cheltenham Town, before he went in for some keyhole surgery to clean out his knee. The surgeon told Swan that "the mess in there is unbelievable... there's no cartilage, there are bits floating around everywhere and it's riddled with arthritis" and warned him that any further matches could see him unable to walk. After a few weeks, Swan accepted both Dolan's and the surgeon's advice and retired.

== Style of play ==
A tough player with a 6 ft 2 in (1.88 m) frame, he prided himself on his ability to out-muscle either his marker or the player he was marking (depending on the position he was playing), though as a result he was sent off ten times in his career and was occasionally criticised for using foul play. His 'no nonsense' approach was criticised by footballing purists such as Dario Gradi, as Swan's 'crunching tackles' could cause injuries to opposition players.

== Post-retirement ==
Though he secretly played a game for Rothwell Town in 1988, he played amateur football for the first time since childhood with pub side New Wheel in 2000, and broke his nose in a game for the club. He gained his A-licence, which allowed him to coach in the professional game, and he took up coaching at Ossett Town. He and John Beresford then set up an unsuccessful wooden flooring company called 'Major Oaks'. The pair then developed a football training product called 'BallMax', Alex Ferguson used it in the Manchester United Academy, but this business also went nowhere. Billy Jennings then took the pair on as football agents at Premier Management International for twelve months.

Northampton Town manager Martin Wilkinson took Swan on as a coach, but soon after Colin Calderwood took over as manager in 2003, Swan found himself again out of work. Swan instead found success in the building trade, constructing a house in his expansive back garden. He also found work as an 'expert witness' for Hull City's games at BBC Radio Humberside in 2003. The next year he also began working as a pundit for the Hull Daily Mail, and did occasional work for BBC Look North.

In May 2009, Swan declared an interest in the vacant position of manager at Port Vale, speaking of his friendships with wealthy Valiants Robbie Williams and Phil Taylor. As a player, he was a "fully paid-up member of the drink culture", and on one of his many nights out he befriended Williams just before Take That hit the charts, and the pair became firm friends.

== Personal life ==
Peter Swan married wife Rebecca in 1989 following a four-year relationship. The couple had two children: George (born 1994) and Harry (born 1997); George made his senior football debut at York City in November 2015, but was released at the end of that season, and now works as an agent.

== Autobiography ==
In conjunction with Andrew Collomosse, Swan released an autobiography in 2008 entitled Swanny: Confessions of a Lower-League Legend, published by John Blake. The foreword was written by Helen Chamberlain, presenter of Soccer AM. He had become a running gag on the show in 2000 after every week the show's production staff persuaded their footballing guest to tell the audience their best mate in football was Peter Swan.

== Career statistics ==
Appearances and goals by club, season and competition
| Club | Season | League | | | FA Cup | | League Cup | | Other (Note: Includes Full Members Cup, Football League Trophy and play-off appearances.) | | Total | |
| Club | Season | Division | Apps | Goals | Apps | Goals | Apps | Goals | Apps | Goals | Apps | Goals |
|---|---|---|---|---|---|---|---|---|---|---|---|---|
| Leeds United | 1984–85 | Second Division | 0 | 0 | 0 | 0 | 0 | 0 | 0 | 0 | 0 | 0 |
| Leeds United | 1985–86 | Second Division | 16 | 3 | 1 | 0 | 0 | 0 | 2 | 0 | 19 | 3 |
| Leeds United | 1986–87 | Second Division | 7 | 0 | 1 | 0 | 1 | 0 | 0 | 0 | 9 | 0 |
| Leeds United | 1987–88 | Second Division | 25 | 8 | 0 | 0 | 2 | 2 | 1 | 0 | 28 | 10 |
| Leeds United | 1988–89 | Second Division | 1 | 0 | 1 | 0 | 0 | 0 | 0 | 0 | 2 | 0 |
| Leeds United | Total | | 49 | 11 | 3 | 0 | 3 | 2 | 3 | 0 | 58 | 13 |
| Hull City | 1988–89 | Second Division | 11 | 1 | 0 | 0 | 0 | 0 | 0 | 0 | 11 | 1 |
| Hull City | 1989–90 | Second Division | 31 | 11 | 1 | 0 | 2 | 0 | 1 | 0 | 35 | 11 |
| Hull City | 1990–91 | Second Division | 38 | 12 | 1 | 0 | 3 | 1 | 0 | 0 | 42 | 13 |
| Hull City | Total | | 80 | 24 | 2 | 0 | 5 | 1 | 1 | 0 | 88 | 25 |
| Port Vale | 1991–92 | Second Division | 33 | 3 | 0 | 0 | 4 | 0 | 2 | 0 | 39 | 3 |
| Port Vale | 1992–93 | Second Division | 38 | 3 | 4 | 1 | 1 | 0 | 8 | 1 | 51 | 5 |
| Port Vale | 1993–94 | Second Division | 40 | 0 | 5 | 0 | 1 | 0 | 2 | 0 | 48 | 0 |
| Port Vale | Total | | 111 | 6 | 9 | 1 | 6 | 0 | 12 | 1 | 138 | 8 |
| Plymouth Argyle | 1994–95 | Second Division | 27 | 2 | 2 | 0 | 2 | 1 | 0 | 0 | 31 | 3 |
| Burnley | 1995–96 | Second Division | 32 | 5 | 1 | 0 | 2 | 0 | 4 | 0 | 39 | 5 |
| Burnley | 1996–97 | Second Division | 17 | 2 | 2 | 0 | 0 | 0 | 2 | 0 | 21 | 2 |
| Burnley | Total | | 49 | 7 | 3 | 0 | 2 | 0 | 6 | 0 | 60 | 7 |
| Bury | 1997–98 | First Division | 37 | 6 | 1 | 0 | 2 | 0 | 0 | 0 | 40 | 6 |
| Burnley | 1998–99 | Second Division | 17 | 0 | 0 | 0 | 0 | 0 | 0 | 0 | 17 | 0 |
| Burnley | 1999–2000 | Second Division | 2 | 0 | 0 | 0 | 0 | 0 | 0 | 0 | 2 | 0 |
| Burnley | Total | | 19 | 0 | 0 | 0 | 0 | 0 | 0 | 0 | 19 | 0 |
| York City | 1999–2000 | Third Division | 9 | 0 | 0 | 0 | 0 | 0 | 0 | 0 | 9 | 0 |
| York City | 2000–01 | Third Division | 2 | 0 | 0 | 0 | 0 | 0 | 0 | 0 | 2 | 0 |
| York City | Total | | 11 | 0 | 0 | 0 | 0 | 0 | 0 | 0 | 11 | 0 |
| Career total | | | 383 | 56 | 20 | 1 | 20 | 4 | 22 | 1 | 445 | 62 |

== Honours ==
Port Vale

- Football League Trophy: 1992–93
- Football League Second Division second-place promotion: 1993–94

Individual

- PFA Team of the Year: 1992–93 Second Division
