= Danny Forrest =

English footballer and manager (born 1984)

Personal information
- Full name: Daniel Paul Halafihi Forrest
- Date of birth: 23 October 1984 (age 42)
- Place of birth: Keighley, England
- Positions: Winger; forward

Team information
- Current team: Liversedge (manager)

Youth career
- 1993–2002: Bradford City

Senior career*
Years	Team	Apps	(Gls)
2002–2005	Bradford City	50	(5)
2005	→ Halifax Town (loan)		
2005–2008	Halifax Town	103	(14)
2008	→ Hucknall Town (loan)		
2008–2010	Crawley Town	70	(8)
2010–2011	Barrow	14	(2)
2011	→ Guiseley (loan)		
2011–2012	Guiseley		
2012–2013	Harrogate Town		
2013–2014	Bradford Park Avenue		
2014	Guiseley		
2014–2015	Gainsborough Trinity		
2016	Silsden		

Managerial career
- 2016–2022: Silsden
- 2022: Guiseley (interim)
- 2023–2025: Thackley
- 2025–: Liversedge
- * Club domestic league appearances and goals

Daniel Paul Halafihi Forrest (born 23 October 1984) is an English football coach and former professional player who played as a winger and a forward. He is manager of non-league club Liversedge.

== Playing career ==
Born in Keighley, Forrest began his career at Bradford City, where he was described as a "promising striker." He joined the club at the age of 9 during the same week as Kevin Sanasy. He made 50 appearances in the Football League for Bradford City, including scoring on his Football League debut.

He signed on loan for Halifax Town in August 2005, before signing permanently later that year. At Halifax Town he spent a loan spell at Hucknall Town in 2008 to regain fitness following an injury. He signed for Crawley Town in May 2008, signing a new contract with the club in May 2009. He was offered another contract by the club in April 2010, but he moved to Barrow in June 2010. While at Barrow he spent a loan spell at Guiseley in January 2011. He was released by Barrow in May 2011, joining Guiseley on a permanent deal. He left Guiseley in September 2012, and played for Harrogate Town before moving to Bradford Park Avenue in July 2013. After a short spell back with Guiseley, his third with the club, he signed for Gainsborough Trinity in November 2014, leaving the club in November 2015, retiring from football.

== Coaching career ==
He returned to football in March 2016 with Silsden, as a player-assistant manager, scoring on his debut. He became manager in November 2016, and led the club to promotion from the North West Counties League First Division in the 2017–18 season.

He left Silsden in June 2022, to become assistant manager at Guiseley. He became interim manager in November 2022 after Danny Ellis was sacked, but left the club later that month after Paul Phillips was appointed the new manager.

After managing Thackley from January 2023, in May 2025 he was appointed manager of Liversedge.

== Personal life ==
He is friends with Mark Trueman.

== Career statistics ==
As of 4 July 2013

Appearances and goals by club, season and competition
Club	Season	League		FA Cup		League Cup		Other		Total	
Club	Season	Apps	Goals	Apps	Goals	Apps	Goals	Apps	Goals	Apps	Goals
Bradford City	2002–03	17	3	0	0	1	0	0	0	18	3
Bradford City	2003–04	13	0	0	0	0	0	0	0	13	0
Bradford City	2004–05	20	2	1	0	0	0	0	0	21	2
Bradford City	Total	50	5	1	0	1	0	0	0	52	5
Halifax Town	2005–06	36	5	2	0	0	0	5	0	43	5
Halifax Town	2006–07	39	7	0	0	0	0	1	0	40	7
Halifax Town	2007–08	28	2	0	0	0	0	0	0	28	2
Halifax Town	Total	103	14	2	0	0	0	6	0	111	14
Crawley Town	2008–09	38	2	0	0	0	0	0	0	38	2
Crawley Town	2009–10	32	6	0	0	0	0	0	0	32	6
Crawley Town	Total	70	8	0	0	0	0	0	0	70	8
Barrow	2010–11	14	2	0	0	0	0	0	0	14	2
Barrow	Total	14	2	0	0	0	0	0	0	14	2
Career total		237	29	3	0	1	0	6	0	247	29
