= Dennis Booth =

English footballer (born 1949)

Personal information
- Full name: Dennis Booth
- Date of birth: 9 April 1949 (age 77)
- Place of birth: Stanley Common, England
- Height: 5 ft 7 in (1.70 m)
- Positions: Midfielder; defender

Youth career
- Charlton Athletic

Senior career*
Years	Team	Apps	(Gls)
1966–1971	Charlton Athletic	77	(5)
1971	Blackpool	12	(0)
1971–1973	Southend United	78	(1)
1973–1974	→ Lincoln City (loan)	16	(3)
1974–1977	Lincoln City	146	(6)
1977–1980	Watford	100	(2)
1980–1985	Hull City	123	(2)
Total		542	(19)

Managerial career
- 1988: Hull City (caretaker)
- 1992–1993: Stafford Rangers
- * Club domestic league appearances and goals

Dennis Booth (born 9 April 1949) is an English former footballer who made more than 550 appearances in the Football League playing as a midfielder or defender for Charlton Athletic, Blackpool, Southend United, Lincoln City, Watford and Hull City.

== Playing career ==
=== Charlton Athletic ===
Booth signed professional forms with Athletic in 1966, after rising through the schoolboy ranks. He remained there until 1971, when he signed for Blackpool for a fee of £7,777. He made 77 appearances and scored 5 goals during this time.

=== Blackpool ===
Booth played 12 games for the Tangerines before signing for Southend United in the same year of 1971.

=== Southend United ===
Booth played 78 games and scored 1 goal for the Roots Hall outfit. In 1973, he signed for Lincoln City.

=== Lincoln City ===
Booth spent five years at Lincoln and played 162 league games; he also chipped in with 9 league goals. He left to join Watford in 1977.

=== Watford ===
Booth spent three years at Watford and played 100 league games for them, with 2 goals along the way. He left to join Hull in 1980.

=== Hull City ===
Booth spent five years as a player and accumulated 123 league games, scoring 2 goals. He retired to join the coaching staff at Boothferry Park.

== Managerial and coaching career ==
Booth was assistant manager to Brian Horton at Hull. In 1988, when Horton was sacked, Booth and Tom Wilson took over on a temporary basis.

Between 1992 and 1993, Booth managed Stafford Rangers. He left the club to become assistant manager to John Ward at Bristol Rovers. Two years later, he left to join Huddersfield Town as Brian Horton's assistant in 1995. He was sacked in 1997.

Appointed as Port Vales Chief Scout in summer 1999, he left his post after just twelve days to take up a similar position at Nottingham Forest.

Booth joined Nuneaton Borough in the early 2000s as assistant manager.

Booth left the Nuneaton Borough coaching staff to become a scout for the England U21 side in July 2002. He was appointed as Carlisle United's assistant manager in October 2003.

He stepped down as Carlisle's assistant manager in June 2006 to join Preston North End. He was released from the Preston staff at the end of the 2006–07 season.

Booth became Carlisle's temporary assistant manager in August 2007.
