= Ademola Bankole =

Nigerian footballer (born 1969)

Personal information
- Full name: Ademola Bankole
- Date of birth: 9 September 1969 (age 57)
- Place of birth: Abeokuta, Nigeria
- Height: 1.91 m (6 ft 3 in)
- Position: Goalkeeper

Youth career
- Shooting Stars

Senior career*
Years	Team	Apps	(Gls)
1995	Doncaster Rovers	0	(0)
1995–1996	Leyton Orient	0	(0)
1996–1998	Crewe Alexandra	6	(0)
1997	→ Hyde United (loan)	7	(0)
1998–2000	Queens Park Rangers	1	(0)
2000	→ Bradford City (loan)	0	(0)
2000–2004	Crewe Alexandra	53	(0)
2004	→ Barnet (loan)	7	(0)
- Lewes
- Windsor & Eton
- Maidenhead United
2005–2006	Brentford	6	(0)
2006–2008	Milton Keynes Dons	6	(0)
2008	Nuneaton Borough		
2008	Colchester United	0	(0)
Total		86	(0)
- * Club domestic league appearances and goals

Ademola Bankole (born 9 September 1969) is a Nigerian former footballer who played as a goalkeeper in the Football League. As a journeyman having played for 15 different clubs during his career, his most notable stint came with Crewe Alexandra, a club he played for on two occasions, registering over 50 league appearances. He was the goalkeeping coach at Colchester United for nine years.

== Career ==
Born in Abeokuta, Bankole began his career with Shooting Stars in his native Nigeria. He moved to England in 1995, signing for Doncaster Rovers, spending a month with the club prior to signing with Leyton Orient. He left Orient in September 1996 having registered no games, joining Crewe Alexandra. He made six appearances for the club between 1996 and 1998. He played seven games in 1997 on loan at Hyde United, earning the man of the match award in the Cheshire Senior Cup final in a 3–0 victory over Macclesfield Town. In 1998, Bankole moved to Queens Park Rangers, making only one substitute appearance for the club. Bankole was sent out on loan to Bradford City while the club were in the Premier League, acting as cover.

Bankole returned to Crewe for a fee of £50,000 in the summer of 2000. Here, he had his greatest success as a player, featuring in 52 league games. While contracted to Crewe, Bankole was called up to the preliminary Nigeria squad prior to the 2002 FIFA World Cup but did not make the final squad. Towards the end of his stint with Crewe and being out of the first-team, Bankole joined Barnet in a three-month loan deal.

In the summer of 2004, Bankole was released by Crewe, temporarily joining Lewes, Windsor & Eton and Maidenhead United in non-league before being picked up by Brentford in February 2005. He spent a year-and-a-half with the Bees, before signing to Milton Keynes Dons in July 2006. He made six appearances for each club.

Bankole left MK Dons in early 2008, joining Nuneaton Borough before being signed by Colchester United as goalkeeper cover for Aidan Davison following Mark Cousins being taken ill with appendicitis, also signing as a temporary coach for the club. Bankole did not make an appearance for Colchester, but was named as permanent goalkeeping coach at the club following Davison's retirement and subsequent move to the United States.

Bankole spent nine years as Colchester's goalkeeping coach until he left in the summer of 2017 when the club had a restructuring of backroom staff. Since 2019 George has been a coach with the QPR under 18 and 23 squads.

== Career statistics ==
Appearances and goals by club, season and competition
Club	Season	League			FA Cup		League Cup		Other^{[A]}		Total	
Club	Season	Division	Apps	Goals	Apps	Goals	Apps	Goals	Apps	Goals	Apps	Goals
Doncaster Rovers	1995–96	Third Division	0	0	0	0	0	0	0	0	0	0
Leyton Orient	1995–96	Third Division	0	0	0	0	0	0	0	0	0	0
Crewe Alexandra	1996–97	Second Division	3	0	0	0	0	0	0	0	3	0
Crewe Alexandra	1997–98	First Division	3	0	0	0	0	0	0	0	3	0
Crewe Alexandra	Total		6	0	0	0	0	0	0	0	6	0
Hyde United (loan)	1996–97	NPL Premier Division	7	0	0	0	0	0	0	0	7	0
Queens Park Rangers	1998–99	First Division	0	0	0	0	0	0	0	0	0	0
Queens Park Rangers	1999–2000	First Division	1	0	0	0	0	0	0	0	1	0
Queens Park Rangers	Total		1	0	0	0	0	0	0	0	1	0
Bradford City (loan)	1999–2000	Premier League	0	0	0	0	0	0	0	0	0	0
Crewe Alexandra	2000–01	First Division	21	0	3	0	1	0	0	0	25	0
Crewe Alexandra	2001–02	First Division	29	0	2	0	1	0	0	0	32	0
Crewe Alexandra	2002–03	Second Division	3	0	1	0	0	0	4	0	8	0
Crewe Alexandra	2003–04	First Division	0	0	0	0	0	0	0	0	0	0
Crewe Alexandra	Total		53	0	6	0	2	0	4	0	65	0
Barnet (loan)	2003–04	Conference	7	0	0	0	0	0	0	0	7	0
Brentford	2004–05	League One	3	0	0	0	0	0	0	0	3	0
Brentford	2005–06	League One	3	0	0	0	0	0	2	0	5	0
Brentford	Total		6	0	0	0	0	0	2	0	8	0
Milton Keynes Dons	2006–07	League Two	6	0	0	0	1	0	2	0	9	0
Milton Keynes Dons	2007–08	League Two	0	0	0	0	0	0	0	0	0	0
Milton Keynes Dons	Total		6	0	0	0	1	0	2	0	9	0
Colchester United	2007–08	Championship	0	0	0	0	0	0	0	0	0	0
Career total			86	0	6	0	3	0	8	0	103	0

A. The "Other" column constitutes appearances and goals (including those as a substitute) in the Football League Trophy.
