= John Swift (footballer, born 1984) =

English footballer (born 1984)

Personal information
- Full name: John Maxwell Swift
- Date of birth: 20 September 1984 (age 42)
- Place of birth: Leeds, England
- Height: 5 ft 7 in (1.70 m)
- Position: Defender

Youth career
- –2004: Bradford City

Senior career*
Years	Team	Apps	(Gls)
2004–2007	Bradford City	12	(0)
2007–20??	Guiseley		
2023 -	South Milford AFC		
- * Club domestic league appearances and goals as of 11:37, 23 July 2020 (UTC)

John Maxwell Swift (born 20 September 1984) is an English footballer who last played for Guiseley. He previously played for Bradford City in League One between 2004 and 2007, playing 12 league games for the club.

== Career ==
Swift was born in Leeds. He started his career at Bradford City's youth academy, before making his debut for Bradford's first team on 6 November 2004, starting in a 2–2 League One draw at home to Colchester United. In March 2005, Swift signed a new one-year deal with the club, keeping him there until the end of June 2006. He made four further appearances across the 2004–05 season as Bradford finished 11th in League One. The 2005–06 season saw Swift make a further 5 appearances for the club as they again finished 11th. Following a victory over Port Vale on 22 April 2006, Swift praised Bradford's supporters, stating "The fans have been good to me", in response to their support of him after being substituted in the first half of their previous match against Gillingham. He signed a further one-year contract extension in May 2006. Having made just two appearances for Bradford City across the 2006–07 season as they finished 22nd and were relegated to League Two, Swift was released by Bradford City at the end of the season.

Following his release from Bradford, Swift joined Northern Premier League Premier Division side Guiseley, making his debut as a second-half substitute in a home victory against Ossett Town in August 2007.
