= Matt Edeson =

English footballer

Personal information
- Full name: Matthew Kirk Edeson
- Date of birth: 11 August 1976 (age 50)
- Place of birth: Beverley, England
- Position: Inside forward

Senior career*
Years	Team	Apps	(Gls)
1992–1995	Hull City	5	(0)
1995	Guiseley		
1995	Winterton Rangers		
1996	North Ferriby United		
1997	Worksop Town		
1997	Hall Road Rangers		
1998	North Ferriby United		
1998	Matlock Town		
1999	Alfreton Town		
1999	Pontefract Collieries		
2000–2001	Bridlington Town		
2001–2002	Goole		
2003	Bridlington Town		
2003–2004	Pontefract Collieries		
2004	Hall Road Rangers		
2005	Winterton Rangers		
2005	Rossington Main		
Total		5	(0)
- * Club domestic league appearances and goals

Matthew Kirk Edeson (born 11 August 1976) is an English former professional footballer who played in the Football League for Hull City. Edeson became Hull City's youngest player on 10 October 1992 at the age of 16 years and 60 days.
