= Danny Ellis (footballer, born 1985) =

English football player and coach

Personal information
- Full name: Daniel James Ellis
- Date of birth: 3 November 1985 (age 40)
- Height: 1.78 m (5 ft 10 in)
- Position: Defender

Team information
- Current team: Bradford (Park Avenue) (assistant manager)

Youth career
- Bradford City

Senior career*
Years	Team	Apps	(Gls)
2005–2015	Guiseley		
2015–2017	Harrogate Town	57	(3)
2017–2021	Farsley Celtic		
2021–2022	Darlington	23	(1)
2023	Liversedge	18	(0)
2024–2025	Liversedge		
2025–2026	Bradford (Park Avenue)		

Managerial career
- 2022: Guiseley
- * Club domestic league appearances and goals

Daniel James Ellis (born 3 November 1985) is an English football coach and former player who is assistant manager at Bradford (Park Avenue).

== Career ==
Ellis, a defender, began his career with Bradford City, where he spent 8 years. He then spent 10 years with Guiseley, making 473 appearances for the club. He later played with Harrogate Town, where he served as club captain, and Farsley Celtic, where he also served as club captain. He signed for Darlington in September 2021, being released at the end of the season.

After being released by Darlington, Ellis became manager of Guiseley, where local media described his impact as a "revolution", with he club being "revitalsised", after he made 7 new signings. Ellis said he was "buzzing", but left the club in November 2022 after a run of poor form.

In January 2023 he returned to playing, signing for Liversedge. In June 2023 he became an assistant manager at Farsley. In November 2024 he returned to Liversedge as player-assistant manager. In May 2025 he joined Bradford (Park Avenue), also as a player-assistant manager.

Ellis retired from playing in May 2026, after over 750 career appearances.
