= Peter Folkes =

English painter (1923–2019)

- Born: Peter Leonard Folkes; 3 November 1923; Beaminster, Dorset, England, United Kingdom
- Died: 7 January 2019 (aged 95)
- Education: West of England College of Art
- Known for: Painting

Peter Leonard Folkes (3 November 1923 – 7 January 2019) was an English painter.

== Education and early life ==
Peter Folkes was born in Beaminster, Dorset, England in November 1923 along with his twin brother, Brian Frederick Folkes, to Leonard Frederick Folkes and Dorothy Folkes (née Tall). He studied painting at the West of England College of Art, Bristol (1941–50) with his education being interrupted, though not curtailed, by the Second World War.

== Career ==
Military service, in World War II, took Folkes to Africa, Sicily and Italy, as a draughtsman in the Signal Corps; he was mentioned in dispatches. In September 1950 Folkes became senior art-master at King Edward VI School, Southampton and later, after a year painting in America on a Goldsmiths Travelling Scholarship, awarded in 1963, he took up the post of lecturer in painting at Southampton College of Art in 1964. In 1989 he became Head of Fine Art at the Southampton Institute of Higher Education where he worked until retirement. (Southampton College of Art was merged, leading to the Southampton Institute of Higher Education which, in turn, became the present Southampton Solent University).

== Works ==
Peter Folkes began painting local scenes of Southampton when he moved there in 1950. His early sketches and paintings are of the estuaries of the rivers Test and Itchen, boatyards, the docklands and Southampton Water. In the late 1950s Folkes experimented with the range of new materials becoming available. His fascination with old weathered gravestones, their carvings and inscriptions, too, developed at this time. Church spires appear in his later, much more Cubist, water-colours. Visits to Portland in the early 1960s resulted in a series of works that show a shift towards Modernism. Folkes, here, used a limited palette of blues and browns to describe the quarries and cliffs. In 1964, whilst in America, a series of paintings emerged, inspired by the regular geometry of skyscrapers. Graham Blakesley of Gable Contemporary Art has written: “Spanning sixty years of artistic output across the 20th century, the influences on Peter Folkes are eminently identifiable in his work. From the academic discipline of the Classical Renaissance to the French Impressionists, from the mid-century Abstract Expressionists through to Pop Art and social realism of the sixties, Peter has always retained an ability to absorb ongoing external influences only to process his own personal style which re-emerges with artistic interest." For the RWA Academicians' Questionnaire of October 2000, Peter Folkes said: "During the last twenty-five years I have been strongly influenced by Cubist painters, in particular Lyonel Feininger, Charles Demuth and Raoul Dufy during his Cubist period. Also the water-colours of Eric Ravilious."

== Collections ==
The paintings of Peter Folkes are located in private collections and in the public collections of the UK Government Art Collection, Arts Council of Great Britain, Southampton City Art Gallery The Royal West of England Academy, the Universities of Hull, Keele, Portsmouth, Southampton (both Southampton and Solent), and King Edward VI School Southampton.

== Awards and prizes ==
In 1952 he was elected an Associate of the Royal West of England Academy and was made an Academician (RWA) seven years later. In 1963 he was awarded a Goldsmiths Travelling Scholarship (USA). In 1969 he was elected a member of the Royal Institute of Painters in Water Colours after which he became vice-president in 1989. He was joint winner of the Winsor & Newton painting prize in 1981 and 1983; in 1998 he won the prize for the best painting in the Royal Institute of Painters in Water Colours Exhibition.

== Personal life ==
Peter Folkes married Muriel Giddings in Bromley in September 1949. The following year, in 1950, Folkes and his wife moved to Southampton where they lived thereafter. Folkes has two sons: Andrew born in 1953, and Richard born in 1950, plus six grandchildren and nine great-grandchildren. He died in January 2019 at the age of 95.
