= Tom Wilson (footballer, born 1940) =

Scottish footballer

Personal information
- Full name: Thomas Wilson
- Date of birth: 29 November 1940 (age 85)
- Place of birth: Rosewell, Midlothian
- Position: Centre back

Senior career*
Years	Team	Apps	(Gls)
1957–1961	Falkirk	8	(1)
1958	→ Linlithgow Rose	?	(?)
1961–1967	Millwall	200	(15)
1967–1971	Hull City	66	(1)
1971–1979	Goole Town	?	(?)
1979	North Ferriby United	?	(?)
- * Club domestic league appearances and goals as of 13:42, 22 September 2023 (UTC)

Tom Wilson (born 29 November 1940 in Rosewell) was a Scottish professional footballer who played as a defender for Falkirk, Millwall and Hull City in the 1970s. He was also a member of the Hull City coaching team during the 1980s.

== Career ==
Thomas Wilson was born in Rosewell, near Edinburgh. He played for St David's School in Dalkeith, the Midlothian county team, Whitehill Welfare and Edina Hearts. He joined Falkirk in August 1957 and in early 1958 was loaned to Linlithgow Rose. By the end of the 1960–61 season, he was an established player in Falkirk's first team.

=== Millwall ===
In July 1961 Wilson was signed for £750 by English Fourth Division side Millwall, making his debut in November 1961 and helping the club gain promotion to the Third Division in 1962. After a relegation in 1964 and a promotion in 1965, Wilson helped Millwall win a second successive promotion, to the Second Division in the 1965–66 season. In total, he made over 200 starts for Millwall, scoring 15 League goals. He also played in over 50 games (the most of any player) in Millwall's record-breaking 59-match unbeaten run of home games from 22 August 1964 to 14 January 1967.

=== Hull City ===
Wilson joined Second Division rivals Hull City in November 1967 for £18,000, under manager Cliff Britton. He scored his only Tigers goal in a November 1968 3–0 win over Bury, but as the side's form faltered, he was replaced at centre half by Geoff Barker in March 1969. He returned to the first team starting XI in December 1969, but after Britton stopped down as manager, Wilson rarely featured under new manager Terry Neill, playing his last Hull game on 21 February 1970 at Preston North End.

=== Goole Town ===
Wilson joined nearby Goole Town in July 1971, making over 350 league and cup appearances over eight years while retraining as a lawyer. After a brief spell at North Ferriby United in 1979, he retired from playing.

== Coaching and managerial career ==
Wilson then initially focused on the law, but returned to Hull City as a member of Brian Horton's coaching team in 1984. During a nine-year spell at the club, he was appointed caretaker manager three times in the late 1980s, the first time succeeding Horton in 1986–87 with Dennis Booth, and later succeeding Colin Appleton before the appointment of Stan Ternent. He later worked for two years as the club secretary at Boothferry Park. He was awarded a testimonial that featured Bobby and Jack Charlton, Billy Bremner and Welsh legend John Charles.

He returned to the legal profession in 1993 and settled in South Cave.

== Family ==
Wilson's grandson is Harry Cardwell, today a player at English National League club Southend United, on loan from Forest Green Rovers.
