= David Mail =

English former professional footballer who played as a central defender

Personal information
- Full name: David Mail
- Date of birth: 12 September 1962 (age 64)
- Place of birth: Bristol, England
- Height: 5 ft 11 in (1.80 m)
- Position: Central defender

Youth career
- 1978–1982: Aston Villa

Senior career*
Years	Team	Apps	(Gls)
1982–1990	Blackburn Rovers	206	(4)
1990–1995	Hull City	150	(2)
- Brigg Town
Total		356	(6)
- * Club domestic league appearances and goals

David Mail (born 12 September 1962) is an English former professional footballer who played as a central defender.

== Career ==
Born in Bristol, Mail played for Aston Villa between 1978 and 1982 without making a senior appearance for them. He later made 356 appearances in the Football League for Blackburn Rovers and Hull City, before playing non-league football for Brigg Town.

== Honours ==
Blackburn Rovers

- Full Members' Cup: 1986–87
