= Gary Hobson =

English footballer

Personal information
- Date of birth: 12 November 1972 (age 53)
- Place of birth: North Ferriby, England
- Height: 6 ft 2 in (1.88 m)
- Position: Defender

Youth career
- 1989–1991: Hull City

Senior career*
| Years | Team | Apps | (Gls) |
| 1991–1996 | Hull City | 142 | (0) |
| 1996–2000 | Brighton & Hove Albion | 98 | (1) |
| 2000 | Chester City | 20 | (1) |
| 2000–2003 | York City | 55 | (0) |
| 2003 | Spennymoor United | | |
| 2003 | Ossett Town | | |
| 2003–200? | North Ferriby United | | |
- * Club domestic league appearances and goals

Gary Hobson (born 12 November 1972) is an English former professional footballer who played as a defender. He played in The Football League for four clubs.

Hobson began his career as an apprentice with Hull City, making his league debut during the 1990–91 season. Over the next six years he went on to make nearly 150 league appearances for the Tigers before switching to Brighton & Hove Albion in March 1996 for £60,000.

In January 2000, new Chester City manager Ian Atkins recruited Hobson as the club battled against relegation from The Football League, initially on loan. He played regularly in defence throughout the remainder of the season, but was unable to help Chester avoid being relegated at the end of the season.

Hobson remained in Division Three with York City. He spent three years with the Minstermen, with his final Football League appearance being against Exeter City in April 2003. In the following months, Hobson spent time with non-league clubs Spennymoor United, Ossett Town and North Ferriby United. He has worked for the sports marketing agency HI Sport and Travel, often working abroad in the process.
