= Leigh Palin =

English footballer

Personal information
- Full name: Leigh Granville Palin
- Date of birth: 12 September 1965 (age 61)
- Place of birth: Worcester, England
- Height: 5 ft 9 in (1.75 m)
- Position: Midfielder

Senior career*
Years	Team	Apps	(Gls)
1983–1985	Aston Villa	0	(0)
1984–1985	→ Shrewsbury Town (loan)	2	(0)
1985–1986	Nottingham Forest	0	(0)
1985–1986	South China (HK)	16	(9)
1986–1989	Bradford City	71	(10)
1989–1990	Stoke City	19	(3)
1990–1992	Hull City	57	(7)
1992	→ Rochdale (loan)	3	(0)
1992	Burnley	1	(0)
1992–1993	Partick Thistle	5	(0)
1993	Tadcaster Albion		
Total		158	(20)

International career
1985	England U19	3	(0)
- * Club domestic league appearances and goals

Leigh Granville Palin (born 12 September 1965) is an English former footballer who played in the Football League for Bradford City, Burnley, Hull City, Rochdale, Shrewsbury Town and Stoke City. His father, Granville, was also a professional footballer.

== Career ==
Born in Worcester, he started his career with Aston Villa. He never played a league game for Aston Villa, and following a short loan spell with Shrewsbury Town, he moved to Nottingham Forest, where he also failed to reach the first team. After a short stint in Hong Kong where he played for South China A.A., scoring 9 goals in 16 appearances, he moved to Bradford City, where his career took off and in three season with the "Bantams" Palin played 94 matches, scoring thirteen goals and also played in the Second Division play-off against Middlesbrough in the 1987–88 season.

He then joined Mick Mills at Stoke City in 1989–90 but Stoke were having a terrible season and were well on their way to relegation and Mills was sacked in November 1989 and in came Alan Ball. Ball made a large number of changes to the squad in an attempt to avoid the drop and in March Palin was allowed to leave for Hull City. He spent three years at Hull and had a brief loan spell with Rochdale followed by a short spell at Burnley, before he moved to Scottish football with Partick Thistle. He dropped into non-league football with Tadcaster Albion.

== Career statistics ==
Appearances and goals by club, season and competition
Club	Season	League			FA Cup		League Cup		Other^{[A]}		Total	
Club	Season	Division	Apps	Goals	Apps	Goals	Apps	Goals	Apps	Goals	Apps	Goals
Aston Villa	1983–84	First Division	0	0	0	0	0	0	0	0	0	0
Shrewsbury Town (loan)	1984–85	Second Division	2	0	0	0	0	0	0	0	2	0
Nottingham Forest	1985–86	First Division	0	0	0	0	0	0	0	0	0	0
Bradford City	1986–87	Second Division	21	3	3	0	1	0	2	0	27	3
Bradford City	1987–88	Second Division	20	3	1	0	4	0	4	0	29	3
Bradford City	1988–89	Second Division	30	4	2	0	4	1	2	2	38	7
Bradford City	Total		71	10	6	0	9	1	8	2	94	13
Stoke City	1989–90	Second Division	19	3	0	0	2	0	2	0	23	3
Hull City	1989–90	Second Division	9	1	0	0	0	0	0	0	9	1
Hull City	1990–91	Second Division	35	5	1	0	3	0	1	0	40	5
Hull City	1991–92	Second Division	13	1	2	0	1	0	2	1	18	2
Hull City	Total		57	7	3	0	4	0	3	1	67	8
Rochdale (loan)	1991–92	Fourth Division	3	0	0	0	0	0	0	0	3	0
Burnley	1992–93	Second Division	1	0	0	0	0	0	0	0	1	0
Career Total			153	20	9	0	15	1	13	3	190	24

A. The "Other" column constitutes appearances and goals in the Football League play-offs, Football League Trophy and Full Members' Cup.
