= Kevin Sanasy =

English footballer

Personal information
- Date of birth: 2 November 1984 (age 42)
- Place of birth: Leeds, England
- Position: Striker

Youth career
- Bradford City

Senior career*
Years	Team	Apps	(Gls)
2002–2005	Bradford City	9	(1)
2004	→ Halifax Town (loan)	2	(0)
2005	→ Leigh RMI (loan)	1	(0)
2005–2006	Farsley Celtic	28	(18)
2006–2007	Guiseley	28	(14)
2007–2008	Worksop Town	31	(24)
2009	FC Halifax Town		
2009–2010	Bradford Park Avenue		
2010	Worksop Town	9	(1)
2010	Bradford Park Avenue	7	(2)
2010–2011	Frickley Athletic	17	(5)
2011	Buxton	5	(0)
2011	Ossett Town		
- * Club domestic league appearances and goals as of 22:12, 7 May 2008 (UTC)

Kevin Sanasy (born 2 November 1984) is an English former professional footballer who played as a striker.

== Playing career ==
Sanasy began his career at Bradford City at the age of 9, signing the same week as Danny Forrest. He scored a club record of nearly 100 goals for the youth and reserve teams. Shortly after his debut Sanasy had a run-in with teammate Gareth Edds on the team bus, and was warned about his conduct by manager Nicky Law. He scored his only senior goal for the club in April 2004. He left the club, initially on loan at Halifax Town, before commencing a career in non-league football.

He had brief loan spells at Halifax Town and Leigh RMI, before he moved to Farsley Celtic.

He had spells at Guiseley, Witton Albion, Worksop Town and FC Halifax Town.

He was offered a trial back at Bradford City in 2010 but he went on holiday instead.

== Coaching career ==
Sanasy undertook his UEFA B coaching qualification in 2018, and he became a coach at Bradford City's academy that year.
