= Michael Standing (footballer) =

English footballer and agent

Personal information
- Full name: Michael John Standing
- Date of birth: 20 March 1981 (age 45)
- Place of birth: Shoreham-by-Sea, England
- Position: Midfielder

Youth career
- 1995–1997: Brighton & Hove Albion

Senior career*
Years	Team	Apps	(Gls)
1997–2002	Aston Villa	0	(0)
2002–2004	Bradford City	30	(2)
2004–2006	Walsall	52	(4)
2006–2007	Chesterfield	0	(0)
2007	AFC Bournemouth	1	(0)
2007	Oxford United	6	(0)
2007–2008	Grays Athletic	15	(2)
2008–2009	Lewes	35	(3)
2011–2012	Shoreham	12	(0)
Total		151	(11)
- * Club domestic league appearances and goals

Michael John Standing (born 20 March 1981) is an English former professional footballer who played as a midfielder. After terminating his playing career, Standing became an agent for former teammate and long-term friend Gareth Barry until his subsequent retirement from professional football. He has also played part-time for his hometown club, Shoreham.

== Career ==
=== Playing career ===
Standing started his footballing career with Brighton & Hove Albion and Aston Villa. After four years at Villa Park, during which time he failed to play for the first team, Standing joined Bradford City.

On 27 May 2004, Standing moved on to Walsall. Over two seasons, Standing made 52 appearances and scored twice.

After trials at Brentford and Colchester United, Standing joined Chesterfield on 18 September 2006, but left soon after, joining Queens Park Rangers on a non-contract basis in January 2007. He had a brief spell with AFC Bournemouth, leaving at the end of the 2006–07 season. He then joined Oxford United on a free transfer prior to the 2007–08 season.

Standing joined Grays Athletic on 21 November 2007, however he was ineligible to play until 1 January 2008 due to the league rulings. He made his debut on New Year's Day in the 4–1 away defeat to Ebbsfleet United. In total, Standing spent only six months at Grays. He was released by the club in the summer of 2008 and signed with Lewes on 21 July 2008. In July 2011 he signed for Shoreham.

=== Agency ===
After retiring as a full-time professional player, Standing was appointed by former Aston Villa and Brighton & Hove Albion teammate Gareth Barry as his new agent after parting company with his previous partner Alex Black. Barry explained that he felt appointing Standing was the correct option as the pair were best friends since childhood and his level of trust in him was "100 per cent".
