= Graeme Atkinson =

English footballer (born 1971)

Personal information
- Date of birth: 11 November 1971 (age 54)
- Place of birth: Hull, England
- Position: Midfielder

Team information
- Current team: Preston (Football Development Lead - Womens & Girls)

Senior career*
Years	Team	Apps	(Gls)
1990–1994	Hull City	149	(23)
1994–1998	Preston North End	86	(6)
1997–1998	→ Rochdale (loan)	5	(0)
1998	Brighton & Hove Albion	16	(0)
1998–1999	Scunthorpe United	1	(0)
1999	→ Scarborough (loan)	16	(1)
1999–2002	Rochdale	51	(6)
2002–2003	Lancaster City	?	(?)
2003	Tamworth	?	(?)
2003	Spennymoor United	?	(?)
2003	Southport	?	(?)
Total		324	(36)
- * Club domestic league appearances and goals

Graeme Atkinson (born 11 November 1971) is an English former professional footballer who normally played as a midfielder.

On 4 July 2008, Atkinson was confirmed as a scout of newly promoted Conference National side Barrow.

In January 2016, Atkinson returned to Preston North End at the club's community department, leading on the Post-16 education provision.

== Honours ==
Preston North End

- Football League Third Division: 1995–96
