= Lee Warren =

English footballer

- Warren at Stocksbridge Park Steels

Personal information
- Full name: Lee Anthony Warren
- Date of birth: 28 February 1969
- Place of birth: Manchester, England
- Height: 6 ft 0 in (1.83 m)
- Positions: Defender; midfielder

Youth career
- Leeds United

Senior career*
Years	Team	Apps	(Gls)
1986–1987	Leeds United	0	(0)
1987–1988	Rochdale	31	(1)
1988–1994	Hull City	153	(1)
1990	→ Lincoln City (loan)	3	(1)
1994–2000	Doncaster Rovers	191	(4)
2000–2005	Barrow		
2005	Goole		
2005–2007	Brigg Town		
2007–?	Stocksbridge Park Steels		
2010–?	AFC Blackburn Leisure		

Managerial career
- 2003–2005: Barrow (assistant)
- * Club domestic league appearances and goals

Lee Anthony Warren (born 28 February 1969) is an English footballer who played as a defender and midfielder.

He started his career as a trainee for Leeds United before moving onto Rochdale and then Hull City where he spent some time on loan to Lincoln City.

Warren then went to Doncaster Rovers where he played during the ill-fated 1997–98 season in which they were relegated but went on to win the supporters' player of the year award in both that season and the following season in the Conference.

At the end of the 1999–2000 season he moved to Barrow with a couple of other Doncaster players. He was appointed assistant manager to Lee Turnbull there in April 2003 until he left in 2005.

He later played for Goole, Brigg Town, Stocksbridge Park Steels and AFC Blackburn Leisure.
