= Paul Hunter (Scottish footballer) =

Scottish footballer

Personal information
- Full name: Paul Hunter
- Date of birth: 30 August 1968 (age 58)
- Place of birth: Kirkcaldy, Scotland
- Position: Forward

Youth career
- Leven Royals

Senior career*
Years	Team	Apps	(Gls)
1984–1989	East Fife	164	(56)
1989–1993	Hull City	68	(11)
1993–1994	Cowdenbeath	25	(6)
1994–1995	East Fife	30	(5)
1995–1999	Stenhousemuir	69	(17)
Total		356	(95)

International career
1988–1989	Scotland under-21	3	(0)
- * Club domestic league appearances and goals

Paul Hunter (born 30 August 1968) is a Scottish former professional footballer who played as a forward for East Fife (1984–89, 1994–95), Hull City (1989–93), Cowdenbeath (1993–94) and Stenhousemuir (1995–99). He played for Scotland under-20s in the 1987 FIFA World Youth Championship.

== Honours ==
=== Player ===
Stenhousemuir

- Scottish Challenge Cup 1995–96
