= Leigh Jenkinson =

English footballer

Personal information
- Full name: Leigh Jenkinson
- Date of birth: 9 July 1969 (age 57)
- Place of birth: Thorne, England
- Position: Midfielder

Senior career*
| Years | Team | Apps | (Gls) |
| 1987–1993 | Hull City | 130 | (13) |
| 1990 | → Rotherham United (loan) | 7 | (0) |
| 1993–1995 | Coventry City | 32 | (1) |
| 1993 | → Birmingham (loan) | 3 | (0) |
| 1995–1998 | St Johnstone | 67 | (10) |
| 1998 | Wigan Athletic | 7 | (0) |
| 1998–2000 | Hearts | 5 | (0) |
| 2000 | → Dundee United (loan) | 4 | (0) |
| 2000–2001 | Barrow | 5 | (1) |
| 2001–2003 | Goole | | |

International career
| | Wales B | 1 | (0) |

Managerial career
- 20??–2014: Epworth Town
- * Club domestic league appearances and goals

Leigh Jenkinson (born 9 July 1969) is an English former professional footballer who played as a midfielder from 1987 until 2003.

He played in the Premier League for Coventry City, and in the Scottish Premier League for St Johnstone, Hearts and Dundee United. He also appeared in the Football League for Hull City, Rotherham United, Birmingham City and Wigan Athletic. He finished his career in non-League football with Barrow and Goole.

== Playing career ==
Jenkinson, who played on the left wing, began his career with Hull City in 1987 and remained at Boothferry Park for six years, making over 130 league appearances for the Yorkshire club. Whilst at Hull, Jenkinson was reputed to be the fastest winger in the Football League and ran in the final eight of the Rumbelows Sprint Challenge, an ITV-organised sprint competition that was organised to test just who was the fastest.

In 1993, the midfielder moved to Premier League side Coventry City, then under the guidance of Phil Neal. After just two years at Highfield Road, which included a short loan spell at Birmingham City, Jenkinson tried his hand at Scottish football with St Johnstone. He won the First Division championship with the Perth club in 1996-97 before leaving McDiarmid Park in 1998 to return to England with Wigan Athletic. His stay at Springfield Park was short, and he left again for Scotland later the same year to sign for Hearts. In 2000, Jenkinson was reunited with former St Johnstone manager Paul Sturrock when he joined Tayside rivals Dundee United.

He finished out his playing career in non-league football with Barrow and Goole.

== Personal life ==
After retiring, Jenkinson lived in North Yorkshire and worked away from the game. He also made an appearance for the Hull City Masters team in 2009.
