= Terry Dolan (footballer) =

English footballer & manager (born 1950)

Personal information
- Full name: Terence Peter Dolan
- Date of birth: 11 June 1950 (age 76)
- Place of birth: Bradford, England
- Height: 6 ft 1 in (1.85 m)
- Position: Midfielder

Youth career
- 1967–1969: Bradford Park Avenue

Senior career*
Years	Team	Apps	(Gls)
1969–1970	Bradford Park Avenue	48	(0)
1970–1976	Huddersfield Town	162	(14)
1976–1981	Bradford City	195	(43)
1981	Rochdale	43	(1)
Total		448	(58)

Managerial career
- 1987–1989: Bradford City
- 1989–1991: Rochdale
- 1991–1997: Hull City
- 2000–2003: York City
- 2006–2007: Guiseley
- * Club domestic league appearances and goals

Terence Peter Dolan (born 11 June 1950) is an English former professional footballer and manager.

== Playing career ==
Born in Bradford, West Riding of Yorkshire, Dolan excelled at both football and rugby union during his schooldays and joined Bradford City as an associate schoolboy in 1966 before signing as an amateur a year later. He signed for Bradford Park Avenue as an amateur at the age of 18 in December 1968. He signed professional terms for the club a year later. He made 49 appearances at Park Avenue until they dropped out of the Football League in 1970. He was transferred to Huddersfield Town for £7,000 in October 1970. He played in all four divisions for Huddersfield. When they missed out on promotion to Division Three in 1975–76 he moved to Bradford City for £10,000 in August 1976. He earned promotion with City to Division Three the following season but the team were relegated after one season. In 1980–81 he was made club captain, but he left on a free transfer at the end of the season after 195 league games, in which time he scored 43 goals.

He joined Rochdale in 1981 and joined non-League side Brackley Town a year later.

During his 448-game career, which included 58 goals, he played at all 92 league grounds.

== Managerial career ==
Terry Dolan became interested in coaching while he was a player and he helped to improve the fortunes of East Bowling Unity in the Bradford Amateur Sunday League, before he started his managerial career in a player-coach position at Harrogate Town. He became youth coach at Bradford City in January 1985. He was then appointed first team coach in August 1986.

Dolan became manager of Bradford City in January 1987, after the sacking of Trevor Cherry. His first game was as caretaker when City won a 5–1 against Oldham Athletic in the FA Cup. He was given the job full-time 11 days later and for the rest of the season he successfully steered the club away from a relegation battle, finishing 10th in the 1986–87 season in the Division Two. In his first full season, the club finished fourth, narrowly missing out on promotion to the top flight for the first time in 66 years.

He was sacked in January 1989 and instead joined Rochdale, who were reviving in Division Four. He helped Rochdale to a record FA Cup run in 1989–90 and mid-table finish but lost support the following season when he introduced Chris Lee, the son of his assistant, to the side.

Dolan joined Hull City acrimoniously as manager in 1991 with Rochdale receiving compensation for Hull's illegal approach. He spent six years with the Tigers, staying at the helm despite two relegations.

In 1997, Dolan returned to Huddersfield Town as reserve team coach under Peter Jackson but left in 2000.

In 2000, he returned to Yorkshire with York City. He was sacked as manager in 2003, with the club citing financial reasons for his departure.

He returned to management in October 2006 with Northern Premier League Premier Division side Guiseley. He parted company with the club in November 2007.

He was a consultant / coach to the St Vincent and Grenadines national team as they progressed through qualifiers for the 2006 World Cup and head of recruitment for Notts County (2014–15 season). Between 2004 and 2013, he worked for the League Managers Association, mentoring new managers and coaches. The role included sitting as a panel member for tribunals to settle transfer disputes between clubs and later for the Premier League as a match delegate, assessing referees. In November 2015, he was appointed as a director of Bradford Park Avenue.

== Managerial statistics ==
Managerial record by team and tenure
Team	From	To	Record					Ref
Team	From	To	P	W	D	L	Win %	Ref
Bradford City	5 January 1987	30 January 1989	112	51	30	31	45.5	
Rochdale	1 March 1989	31 January 1991	100	40	21	39	40.0	
Hull City	30 January 1991	14 July 1997	322	99	96	127	30.7	
York City	11 February 2000	31 May 2003	173	56	50	67	32.4	
Guiseley	26 October 2006	24 November 2007	49	25	11	13	51.0	
Total			756	271	208	277	35.8	—
