= Education in Kingston upon Hull =

Education in Kingston upon Hull is governed by the unitary authority of Kingston upon Hull.

The city has fourteen secondary schools and seventy one primary schools. At secondary level it operates a comprehensive admission policy (as does all of former Humberside). It has two sixth form colleges and one comprehensive with a sixth form. It was one of the first LEAs in England to go comprehensive.

== Early years ==
The City and County Borough of Hull had its first education authority formed in the Education Act 1902. In the mid-1920s it was awarding 175 scholarships to its grammar schools and four university scholarships. In 1925, plans were made to vastly increase the numbers of school places, but the type of schools available would follow the 1926 Hadow Report.

=== Early colleges ===
The Art School opened on Anlaby Road in 1905, and the Technical School was formed on Park Street, later to become the Technical College. The College of Education was founded on Cottingham Road in 1916, and was initially mostly female.

=== Early stages of the university ===
There was a large need for a college of advanced education to degree standard. A possible plan was to develop the Technical College and move the site elsewhere. The city's education committee refused to stump up any money. In March 1922, Thomas Ferens of Reckitt's, and former Liberal MP, bought an 18-acre (73,000 m^{2}) site on Cottingham Road. In 1925 he gave £250,000 in shares in Reckitt's to form a university college. Reckitt's needed qualified workers. The University College was incorporated on 7 October 1927, and opened on 11 October 1928. It had 16 teachers and 35 full-time students. Throughout the 1930s it averaged about 200 full-time students.

Many schools were damaged during the Hull Blitz.

== Post war years ==
After the war the schools in Hull were administered by the Kingston upon Hull Education Authority which became the Kingston upon Hull Education Committee in the early 1950s. A rapid programme of school building followed for the next twenty years.

=== Grammar schools ===
- Hull Grammar School on Bricknell Avenue from 1953 with 900 boys. Under LEA control from 1945. Became a boys' comprehensive in 1969 then William Gee School in 1988 when it lost its sixth form. In 1988 a separate independent school with the same name was established on Bishop Alcock Road.
- Kingston High School – opened in 1940 out of Boulevard High School. It had 750 boys and girls. It became Sirius College, an academy. Famous Alumni include Amy Johnson, Tom Courtenay and John Alderton
- Malet Lambert High School – moved to James Reckitt Avenue in East Park in 1932 and had 750 boys and girls. It was named after a chairman on the education authority.
- Marist College – voluntary aided RC school with 350 boys and opened on Cottingham Road in 1925. Merged with St Mary's School.
- St Mary's Grammar School – voluntary aided RC school, mostly destroyed by bombs in 1941 having been established by the Sisters of Mercy next to a convent on Anlaby Road. It moved to Inglemire Lane in 1960. It became St Mary's R.C. (Voluntary aided) High School for Girls and is now St Mary's Sports College.
- Newland High School – opened in 1920 for 700 girls on Cottingham Road. It is still a girls' school.
- Riley High School opened on Parkfield Drive in 1957. It had 700 boys and originated from part of the Technical College in 1926. It became a boys' comprehensive and was named after J.T. Riley, secretary of Hull's education authority. Wrong, Riley Technical High School opened in Parkfield Drive. It was formerly known as Riley High School and was sited in the Boulevard. It finally became a comprehensive with boys and girls before closing and was demolished in 2006.

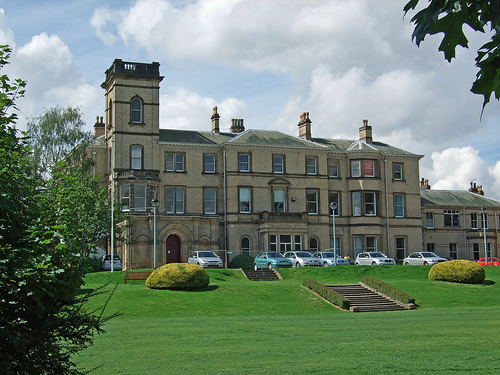
Tranby Croft – former home of Hull High School, now Hull Collegiate School

=== Direct-grant grammar schools ===
- Hymers College – more difficult to get into than the LEA grammar schools

=== Independent schools ===
- Hull High School – girls at Tranby Croft, Anlaby, now part of the mixed Hull Collegiate School

=== Secondary modern schools ===
In 1948 there was a plan for 27 new secondary modern schools, with only two being co-educational, however more were built co-educational.

- Ainthorpe High School – 800 boys and girls, formed in 1945 from the former Aithorpe Grove School. Became a primary school.
- Craven High School – 800 boys and girls, took over former premises of the Malet Lambert High School in 1932
- Eastfield High School – 600 boys and girls
- Endike High School – opened in 1945 with 400 boys from a former school on Endike Lane.
- Flinton High School – 600 girls
- Francis Askew High School for Boys, 350 boys, named after the Chairman of the education committee and established in 1925
- Francis Askew High School for Girls, 300 girls
- Mersey High School – 500 boys and girls
- Newington High School – 350 boys and girls
- Wawne High School – 250 girls, now the Kingswood College of Arts on Wawne Road in Bransholme.
- Sir Henry Cooper Girls' School – 250 girls, named after a chairman of the former education board when established in 1876
- Southcoates High School – 300 boys
- Welton High School – 700 boys and girls
- Wilberforce High School – opened in 1953 on Leicester Street with 700 boys
- Boothferry High School – opened in 1961 for 450 boys and girls on Saltshouse Road. It became Wilberforce College in 1988.
- Saltshouse High School – opened in 1961 for 450 boys and girls
- Greatfield High School – opened on Hemswell Avenue, west of the Greatfield Estate - comprised Newton Hall (for those passing the 11+) opened in 1957 for 600 boys and girls, Elizabethan Hall (400 boys and girls and opened in 1959) and Shakespeare Hall (opened in 1961 with 450 boys and girls), and it later became the whole Greatfield High School with 1,200 boys and girls.
- Alderman Cogan High School – C of E opened 1957 with 300 girls and boys
- St Richard's High School (RC) – opened 1962 with 450 boys and girls.
- Wyke Hall, Bricknell High School opened 1957 with 450 boys and girls
- Barham High School – opened in 1953 with 450 girls, and is now The Marvell College (named after the poet Andrew Marvell who attended Hull Grammar School)
- Boulevard High School – opened in 1957 with 650 boys
- East Mount High School – opened in 1957 with 450 boys and girls
- Jervis High School – opened in 1956 with 450 boys

There were other older senior schools, which later became primary schools.

=== Technical Schools ===
There were also technical schools attached to the College of Art and the Nautical School which opened in 1963.

- High School for Building – boys
- High School for Commerce – 300 boys and girls – with a sixth form on Brunswick Avenue. It lacked science courses and was part of the College of Commerce.
- Thoresby High School – opened in 1945 with around 600 girls
- Kelvin Hall, Bricknell High School opened in 1959, with 450 boys and girls. Run separately to Wyke Hall on the same campus. Later it became Kelvin Hall School.
- Estcourt High School, opened in 1945 (for those passing the 11+) for 600 girls on Hopewell Road, after former school destroyed by bombing in 1941. Became a girls' comprehensive in 1969, then the mixed Bilton Grange Senior High School in 1973, and then in 1988 became the Archbishop Thurstan C of E School, and then was replaced by the Archbishop Sentamu Academy in September 2008
- Newton Hall, Greatfield High School – opened in 1957 for 600 boys and girls
- Hull Trinity House Marine School (later renamed Trinity House Engineering school) established originally in 1787 and an independent institution with around 200 boys in the 1960s. It is now Hull Trinity House Academy, Hull's only boys' school.

In 1962 the city had 20,000 secondary school pupils at 44 schools. 64% were in secondary modern schools, 10% in grammar schools, and 10% in technical schools.

=== Comprehensive transformation ===
In 1969, Hull transformed its schools into ages 13–18 comprehensive schools, most with around 1,500 boys and girls. These types of schools were called Senior High Schools and followed the three-tier model, which the rest of Humberside (except parts of Grimsby) would not.

New comprehensives were:

- Sir Leo Schultz High School - built on new site and opened in 1967, 8 form entry boys and girls on Orchard Park Estate, sharing playing fields with Henry Cooper. Now demolished.
- David Lister High School – 1,500 boys and girls on Rustenburg Street, Hull's first comprehensive opened in 1964.
- Sir Henry Cooper High School, built on a new site in 1967 at Thorpepark Road on the Orchard Park Estate.

Renamed schools were: Bransholme High School on Midmere Avenue in Bransholme, which is now the Winifred Holtby Academy.

In April 1974 the schools and colleges were taken over by Humberside Education Committee, based in Beverley. From 1974 to 1988 Humberside ran Hull's schools, with those in East Yorkshire, Grimsby and Scunthorpe. It would have become obvious to the county council that Hull's education was suffering, relative to its other areas, as it had plenty of schools (in East Yorkshire) that were not. Humberside also had two sixth form colleges – the John Leggott College and Franklin College, Grimsby, both south of the Humber, that were producing consistent outstanding results at A-level – the best in Humberside. Meanwhile, Hull's A-level candidates were spread thinly across mostly underperforming schools, leading them to the conclusion that Hull would be better off reforming its schools, which led them to intervene and the county council disposed of all but one of Hull's school-attached sixth forms.

=== Loss of sixth forms ===
Access to a large enough sixth form was the reason why comprehensive schools had to be large. Large comprehensive schools have not worked as cohesively than smaller schools. It was impractical to have so many schools with sixth forms in Hull because there simply wasn't the demand for them, so it was more efficient to separate the sixth forms and concentrate them for those interested in post-16 education. Viability of the sixth forms in a time of falling school rolls was the reason for the abolition of Hull's sixth forms in 1988.

It was a more efficient operation all-round. Other metropolitan LEAs such as Manchester (another poorly performing LEA) did something similar around this time. The two sixth form colleges have since produced good results. The sixth form colleges are the remnants of the type of education offered at the former grammar schools. The situation would not have been the same at the previous 13–18 schools, with the only 11–18 school kept being St Mary's College.

Hull Grammar School became the name of a separate independent school in 1988 when Hull schools lost their sixth forms. The new independent school had problems in 1990, entering administration – from competition from sixth form colleges, but has stayed independent. The former school became William Gee School for Boys in 1988, and the Endeavour High School in 2001, effectively closing the former buildings.

=== Decline and rebuilding ===
There has often been a problem with parents seeking school places outside of the LEA, often to the East Riding, near the west of Hull.

Two new academy schools have been built – the Sirius Academy (former Pickering High School Sports College) and the Archbishop Sentamu Academy (former Archbishop Thurstan Church of England Voluntary Controlled School, which was Estcourt High School, a technical school for girls before 1969) on Hopewell Road on the Bilton Grange Estate.

== School academic results ==
Hull has some schools which regularly get above-average results; these are (in descending order) –

- Hull Trinity House School
- Malet Lambert School Language College
- St Mary's College
- Kelvin Hall School
- Newland School for Girls

These schools were coincidentally former selective schools. Both of Hull's single sex schools get above-average results.

== Colleges ==
=== Further education ===
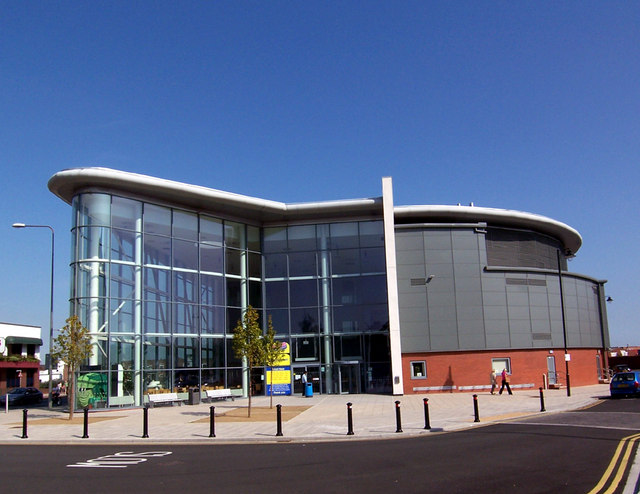
Part of Hull College near North Bridge

- Regional College of Art, formerly the Regional College of Arts and Crafts before 1968, starting as the College of Arts and Crafts in 1930, from the Art School. It had the Hull School of Architecture and a department of Industrial Design. It was later to be part of the University of Humberside, and the last vestige that university's presence in Hull, when consumed by the University of Lincoln
- (Former) Hull Nautical College, formerly the Boulevard Nautical School – formed in 1920 from the Technical College's School of Fisherman
- Hull College – formerly the College of Technology, which offered BSc courses in Mechanical and Aeronautical Engineering in the 1960s (also Pure Maths, Statistics, Physics, Chemistry), and HNDs. It is situated on Queen's Gardens.

=== Sixth form ===
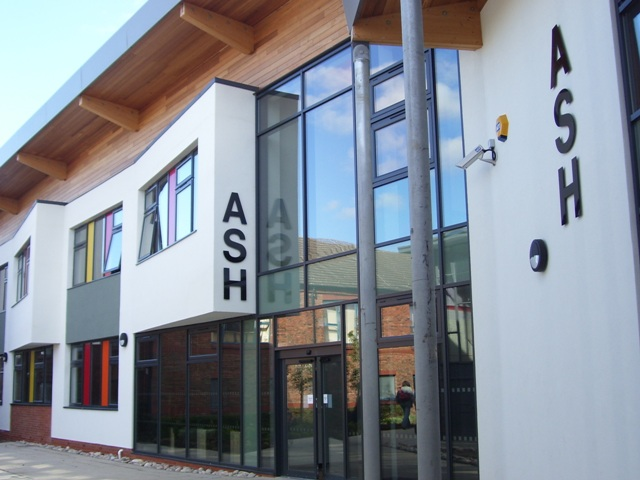
Wyke College Ash Building

The sixth form colleges formed in 1988, and have undoubtedly saved Hull's sixth formers from needless distractions and hence achieve good results.

- Kingston upon Hull, before Edward I of England, was formerly known as Wyke upon Hull. Wyke Sixth Form College was formed from Bricknell High School (Wyke Hall).
- Wilberforce College on Saltshouse Road – named after William Wilberforce (educated at Hull Grammar School). It is the former Saltshouse High School.

=== Higher education ===
These combined by Humberside County Council with the Regional College of Art (Hull School of Art), Hull College of Technology, and Hull Nautical College in September 1976 to form the LEA-run Hull College of Higher Education, which became Humberside College of Higher Education in 1983, and whose last incarnation is the University of Lincoln, some forty miles south of Hull, leaving Hull high and dry.

- Kingston upon Hull College of Education was on Cottingham Road next to the university, formerly Kingston upon Hull Training College before the mid-1960s (known as the Municipal Training College from 1913 until the late 1950s).
- Endsleigh College of Education on Inglemire Avenue, formerly the Endsleigh Training College – teacher training for women – which was not LEA run.
- Hull College of Commerce, HND and HNCs, Brunswick Avenue, off Beverley Road. Formed in 1936 as the College of Commerce from the Technical College. Shared its building with High School of Commerce in a building that opened in 1896 as the Central Grade Higher School, that moved in 1920 to Cottingham Road to become Newland High School.

== Universities ==
- The University of Hull is the only institution listed here that has had no contact (financial or administration) with the Hull City Council, or its previous incarnations. Because of that or not, it has had a fairly smooth course of its history, and has provided the world with liquid crystal displays. It has formed the Hull York Medical School (HYMS) with the University of York. It went from around 90 students during the war on its 62-acre (250,000 m^{2}) site to about 1,000 in the early 1950s. It was granted a university charter in 1954. Since 2000 it has had the University of Hull Scarborough Campus.
- Progressing from the city's higher education colleges, the University of Humberside had a rapid transformation from separate institutions run by the city's Education Committee, until it was taken over by the University of Lincoln. Having been the Hull College of Higher Education on Cottingham Road, it became the Humberside College of Higher Education (HCHE) in January 1983 when it absorbed part of Grimsby College of Technology. The University of Lincolnshire and Humberside was formed in 1996, based in Hull. It maintained the original structures until 2002, when the headquarters were moved to Lincoln, became the University of Lincoln and consolidated some agricultural colleges from De Montfort University. Hull's only remaining input was the former School of Art. Hull's history of higher education colleges, with different emphasis and specialisations were uprooted and transferred over the Humber to Lincoln.
