= Richard John Durley =

British engineer born 11 February 1868

- Born: 11 February 1868; Bierton, Buckinghamshire
- Died: 13 August 1948 (aged 80); Montreal, Canada
- Education: Bedford Modern School; University College, Bristol; University College London
- Known for: Professor of Mechanical Engineering at McGill University (1901–1912); One of three commission members for the design of the University of British Columbia

Richard John Durley MBE (11 February 1868 – 13 August 1948) was Professor of Mechanical Engineering at McGill University (1901–1912), one of three commission members for the design of the University of British Columbia and, during World War I, Officer-in-Charge of Gauges and Standards in the Canadian Ministry of Munitions Department of Inspection.

After the war he was appointed a founding vice-chairman and secretary of the Canadian Engineering Standards Committee with Sir John Kennedy acting as chairman. In 1919, he was appointed Secretary of the Canadian Engineering Standards Association and in 1925 was appointed Secretary of the Engineering Institute of Canada until his retirement in 1938. Durley was also editor of the Engineering Institute of Canada's Engineering Journal between 1925 and 1938.

== Early life ==
Durley was born in Bierton in Buckinghamshire, the son of Richard and Elizabeth Durley. His father, the descendant of a long line of yeoman farmers, died when Durley was an infant and his mother became a schoolteacher to raise the family. He was educated at Bedford Modern School, then at University College, Bristol, and University College London.

== Career ==
Durley trained at Earle's Shipbuilding and Engineering Company Limited in Hull. In 1893, he was awarded a Whitworth scholarship and in 1894 became chief lecturer in engineering at the Municipal Technical College in Hull.

Durley emigrated to Canada in 1896 where he later became Professor of Mechanical Engineering at McGill University in Montreal between 1901 and 1912. In 1903 he wrote a widely used text book Kinematics of Machines. He was made a member of the Institution of Civil Engineers in 1905.

During World War I Durley was Officer-in-Charge of Gauges and Standards in the Canadian Ministry of Munitions Department of Inspection. In 1918 he was awarded an MBE for his wartime services in Canada.

After the war, Durley became Secretary of the Canadian Engineering Standards Association and in 1925 took the same position at the Engineering Institute of Canada until his retirement in 1938. He was editor of the Engineering Institute of Canada's Engineering Journal between 1925 and 1938.

In addition to the Institution of Civil Engineers, Durley was a member of the American Society of Mechanical Engineers and in 1941 received the Engineering Institute of Canada's Julian C. Smith Medal.

== Family life ==
Durley was a regular contributor to engineering journals. He was a member of the University Club of Montreal and the Rideau Club in Ottawa; his entry in Who's Who in 1926 lists his interests as sailing, shooting and fishing. He married Elizabeth Schwill of New York; they had a daughter and a son, Thomas Richard, who also became an engineer.

Durley died in Montreal, Canada on 13 August 1948.

== Selected work ==
- Durley, R. J. (1911) [1903]. Kinematics of machines; an elementary text-book (2nd ed.). New York: John Wiley & Sons: London: Chapman & Hall. See also 1st edition, 1903
