= Rollits LLP =

Commercial law firm of Hull and York, England

- Headquarters: Kingston upon Hull
- No. of offices: 2
- No. of attorneys: 60
- No. of employees: Approximately 100
- Key people: Richard Field (Senior Partner); Ralph Gilbert (Managing Partner)
- Date founded: 1841
- Company type: Limited Liability Partnership
- Website: rollits.com

Rollits LLP is a Yorkshire commercial law firm, with offices in Hull and York, England. The firm was founded in 1841 by John Rollit.

In May 2010 the firm changed from a traditional law partnership to a Limited Liability Partnership with the name Rollits LLP.

== History ==
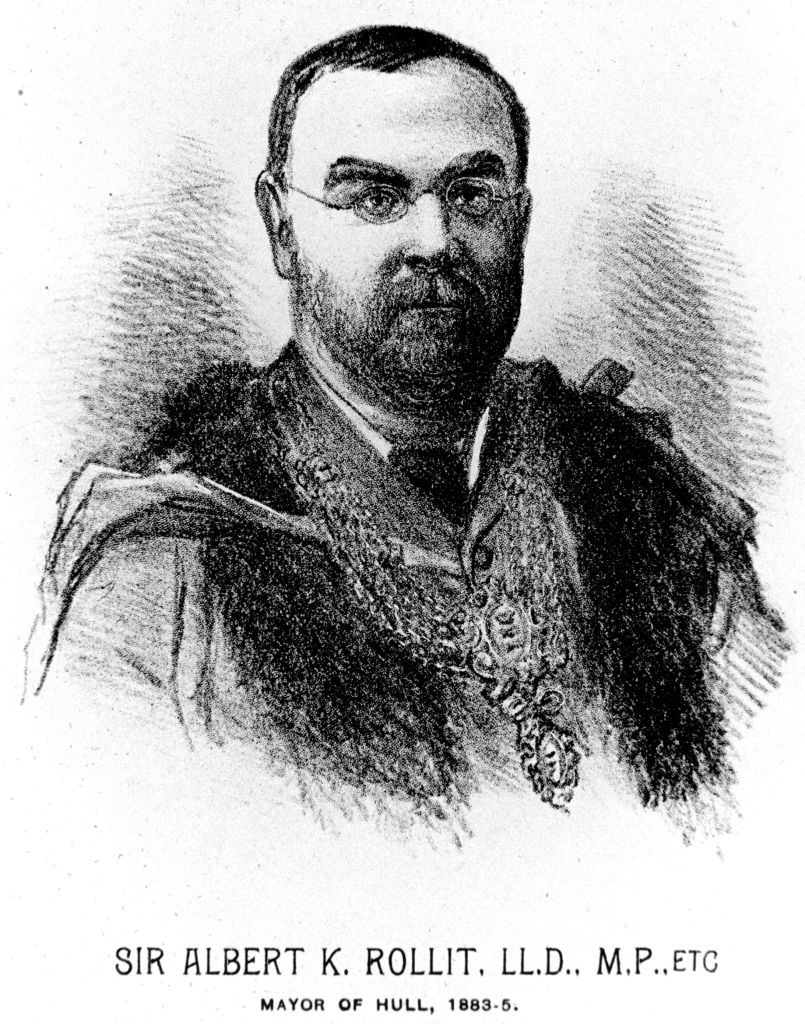
Albert Rollit

In Hull in 1841, John Rollit, the son of a local cabinet-maker, was admitted as a solicitor and taken into partnership by local solicitor William Dryden at 2 Bowlalley Lane, a firm that became Dryden Sons and Rollit.

Having married Eliza Kaye, the daughter of architect Joseph Kaye, the Builder of Huddersfield, Rollit set up his law firm at 62 Whitefriargate in 1850.

In the twentieth century the firm continued under the direction of John’s two sons Albert and Arthur. Thomas Farrell joined in 1875, after a spell as a journalist for the Hull Morning News, but it was his son, Hugh, who put their family's name on the brass plate. Dick Bladon became a Partner on New Year’s Day 1934 when the firm became Rollit Farrell & Bladon. It retained that name until 2001, when it changed to Rollits.

In the 1970s the firm merged with Mainprize & Rignall, and in the 1980s acquired Neville Hobson & Co.

In 1990, Rollits opened an office in York city centre, moving out to Forsyth House, Monks Cross in April 2017.
