= Kingston upon Hull City Police =

Municipal police force in Kingston upon Hull, England

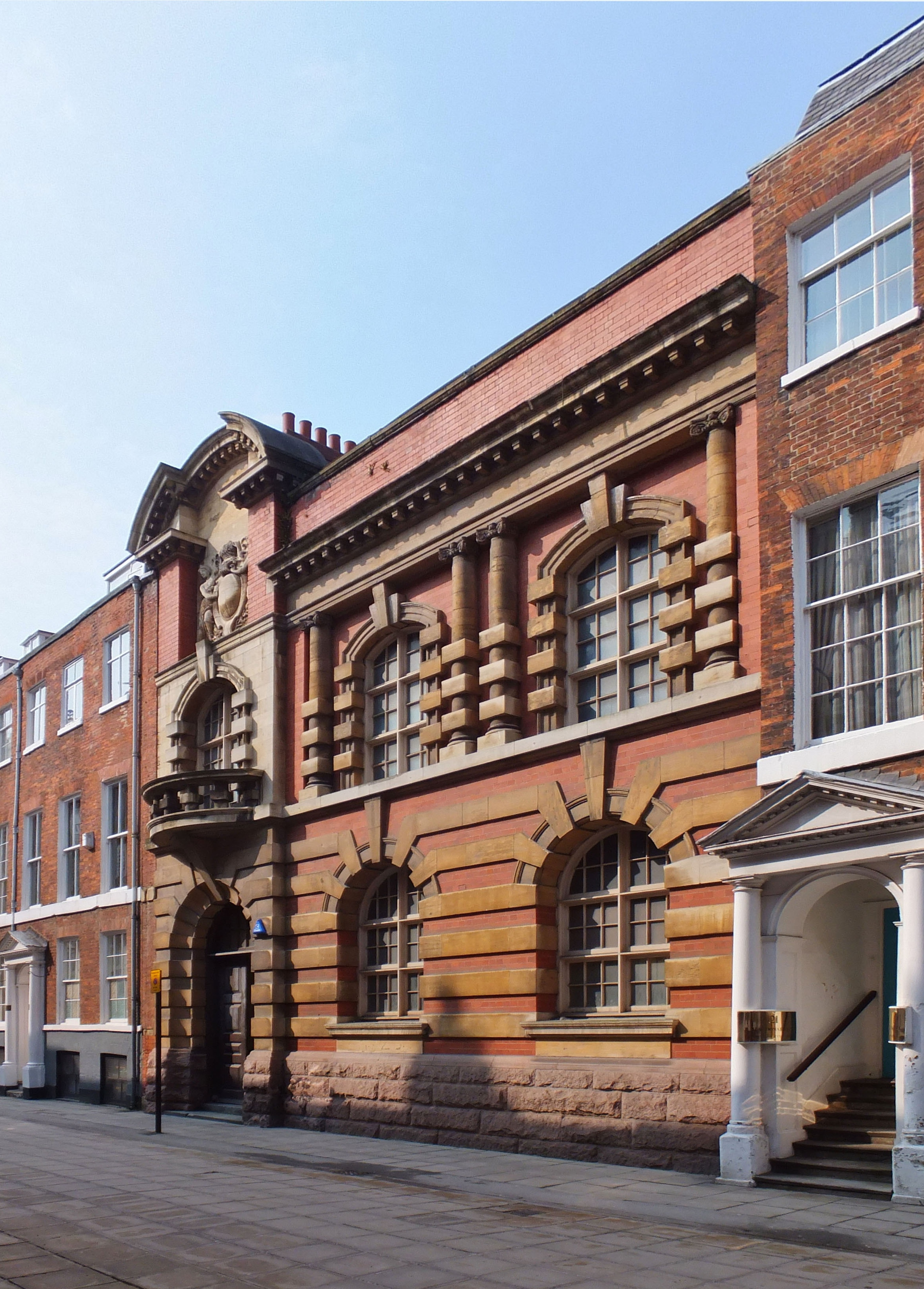
Remnants of the second Central Police Station on Parliament Street, Kingston upon Hull

Kingston upon Hull City Police was the police force responsible for policing the city of Kingston upon Hull in the East Riding of Yorkshire, England from 1836 until 1974, when it was amalgamated under the Local Government Act 1972 with parts of other forces to form the Humberside Police.

The first chief police officer was Alexander McManus (1836–1866) and the last (1962 until amalgamation) Robert Walton. There is a memorial within Clough Road Police Station to the officers from the force who died during the First World War.

The force's Central Police Station has moved between a number of locations. The first station was located on Whitefriargate, purchased in 1852 from the Hull Incorporation of the Poor, and was used until a purpose-built station was opened on Alfred Gelder Street in 1902. Hull's final Central Police Station opened adjacent to Queen's Gardens in 1957, later becoming the base of Hull's Humberside Police operations until its closure for redevelopment in 2013.
