= Boothferry Park =

Former football stadium in Kingston upon Hull, England

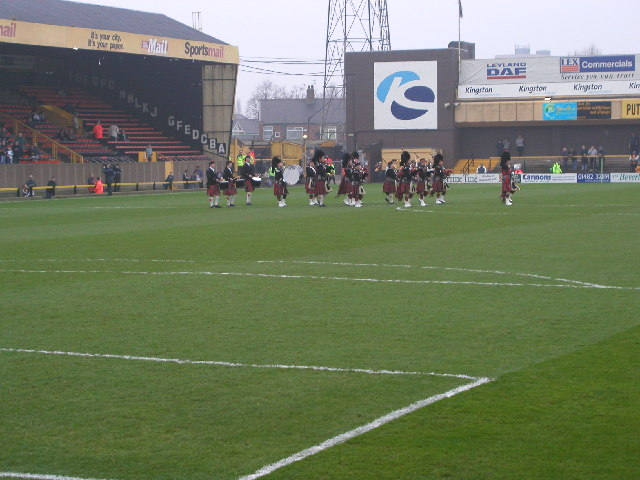
- Boothferry Park prior to closure in 2002
- Interactive map of Boothferry Park
- Location: Kingston upon Hull, East Riding of Yorkshire, England
- Coordinates: 53°44′25.52″N 00°23′23.02″W
- Capacity: 15,160 (at close)
- Surface: Grass
- Record attendance: 55,019 (Hull City vs. Manchester United, 26 February 1949)
- Public transit: Boothferry Park Halt (1951–1989)

Construction
- Built: 1932–1946
- Opened: 31 August 1946; 80 years ago
- Closed: 14 December 2002; 23 years ago
- Demolished: 2008–2011
- Cost: £80,000

Tenant
- Hull City A.F.C. (1946–2002)

Boothferry Park was a football stadium in Kingston upon Hull, East Riding of Yorkshire, England, which was the home of Hull City from 1946 until 2002. The ground's capacity varied throughout its history, but stood at 15,160 at the time of its closure.

The Tigers moved into the newly built KC Stadium in the middle of the 2002–03 season. Following this, Boothferry Park was occupied solely by supermarkets Iceland and Kwik Save, both of whom had opened stores inside the ground's structure in the 1990s when the football club was struggling financially. The first parts of the stadium were demolished in early 2008, more than five years after the last professional game was played there. The demolition was completed in 2011, with residential housing now standing on the site of the old ground.

The record attendance at Boothferry Park was set on 26 February 1949, when 55,019 spectators watched Hull face Manchester United in an FA Cup quarter-final. This remains the highest-ever attendance for a home match in the club's history. The stadium also hosted some England youth internationals, as well as a singular senior fixture between Northern Ireland and Spain in 1972.

== History ==
=== The planning years (1929–1946) ===
In 1929, with the future of Anlaby Road uncertain, Hull City began planning a move away and into a new home elsewhere. That year, they acquired a plot of land near Gipsyville adjacent to Boothferry Road, which had once belonged to the local golf club. A loan of £3,000 from the Football Association had helped to fund the purchase, however the impact of the Great Depression delayed any further progress. Construction eventually began in 1932, but even then development was slow, with only the pitch laid out and some terracing installed in the immediate 12 months that followed. Work was then put on hold until 1939 when the project was almost abandoned.

A proposal was put forward to turn the land into a multi-purpose sports stadium but, as a reasonable price was not offered, Hull City were able to reignite their idea to build a new home ground just for themselves. Another loan from the FA was needed to do so, this time receiving £6,600. Now set with financial backing, the club hoped that construction would be completed in time for the 1940–41 season. Ultimately, though, these hopes were dashed due to the outbreak of the Second World War. The conflict also unsurprisingly took a toll on what had already been built. Amidst the devastating Hull Blitz, the land off Boothferry Road was occupied by the Home Guard and was, for a period, additionally used to repair tanks. As a result, the pitch was in very poor shape by the end of the war and had become prone to waterlogging.

Hull spent the regionally divided 1945–46 season at The Boulevard, whilst work on Boothferry Park resumed thanks to a cash injection from new club chairman Harold Needler.

=== Opening and continued construction (1946–1990) ===
By the time the following campaign came around, only the West Stand had actually been completed. Despite this, the club chose to move in anyway and staged their season opener there against Lincoln City. On 31 August 1946, a crowd of 25,586 packed into the unfinished stadium to watch the two teams play out a goalless draw. Although there were no goals, fans had been entertained by a pre-match ceremony performed by the Lord Mayor, Isaac Robinson. Furthermore, as a part of the unveiling rituals, the players were led onto the pitch by Sergeant J.T. "Tommy" Brooke riding a white horse. Sergeant Brooke was a veteran of the First World War and the Battle of the Somme, where he was a machine gunner with the Royal Horse Guards. By 1946, he was working as a detective and mounted officer in the Hull City Police.

In the immediate years after Boothferry Park opened, more of the ground was finished, growing its capacity to surplus of 50,000 spectators. Next to be completed was the North Stand, which was almost immediately upgraded in 1950 to house a further 3,000 fans in its upper tier. The Kempton Stand on the east side of the ground was built at a similar time, and was later fitted with a roof over the middle portion of its terracing in April 1951. The addition had initially been considered temporary, with plans in the works for a new two-tiered eastern stand, but these never materialised and the original structure remained there for the rest of the stadium's lifetime. As more of the ground was expanded, the construction of a purpose-built railway station, Boothferry Halt, was justified. It was built behind the Kempton Stand, and opened in January 1951.

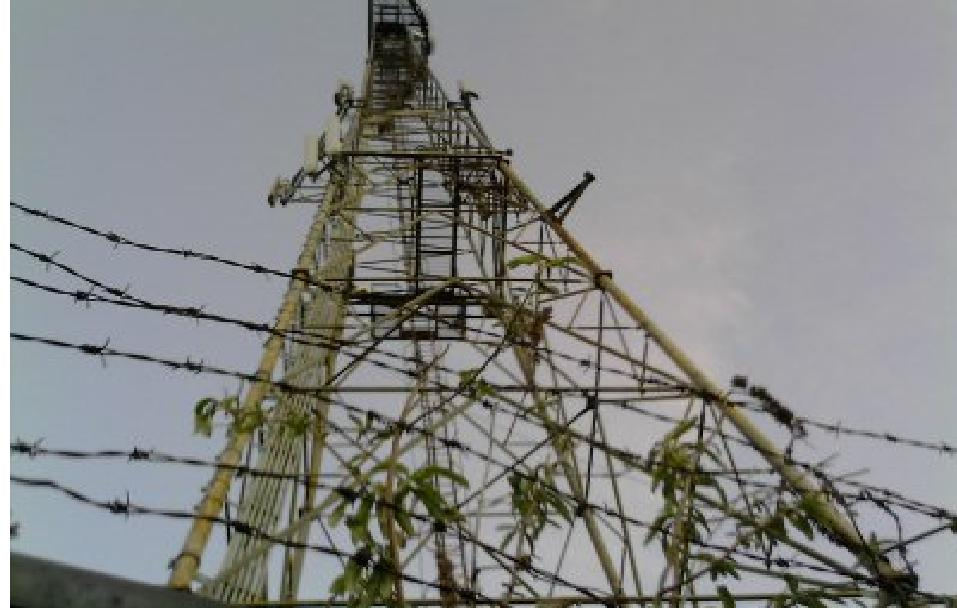
Lights of Boothferry Park

With the three stands completed, the ground was now suited to a floodlight installation. Two gantries housing 96 lamps were built, one on the west and one opposite on the east following a licence being granted. Although this lighting system was the envy of many clubs, advancements in stadium lighting came rapidly, and the system soon needed replacing. Six new pylons eventually replaced the old gantries in 1963. The new lights were used for the first time in 1964, using four of the six available, in an evening match against Barnsley which ended in a 7–0 win for the Tigers. In 1965, a new South Stand was built over the Bunker's Hill terrace. The two-tiered structure included a propped cantilever roof, with 2,500 seats in the upper tier and terracing for 4,000 more in the lower tier.

=== Disrepair, closure, and demolition (1990–2011) ===
In January 1990, the Taylor Report required all clubs in the top two divisions of English football to have an all-seater stadium by August 1994. Hull were in the Second Division by this stage, but their relegation at the end of the 1990–91 season meant that the club was not covered by these requirements. Attendances fell throughout the 1990s as Hull suffered a further relegation in 1996 and financial problems almost put the club out of business, with strained finances meaning that Boothferry Park was not properly maintained and fell into increasing disrepair.

By 1998, however, a move to an all-seater stadium elsewhere was in the pipeline. The final football match to be staged at Boothferry Park saw Hull City lose 0–1 to Darlington in December 2002. The goal was scored by Simon Betts; it would be his only goal in Darlington colours. Darlington goalkeeper Michael Ingham played in both the final match at Boothferry Park and the first match to be played at Hull City's new home (in Sunderland colours) at the KC Stadium.

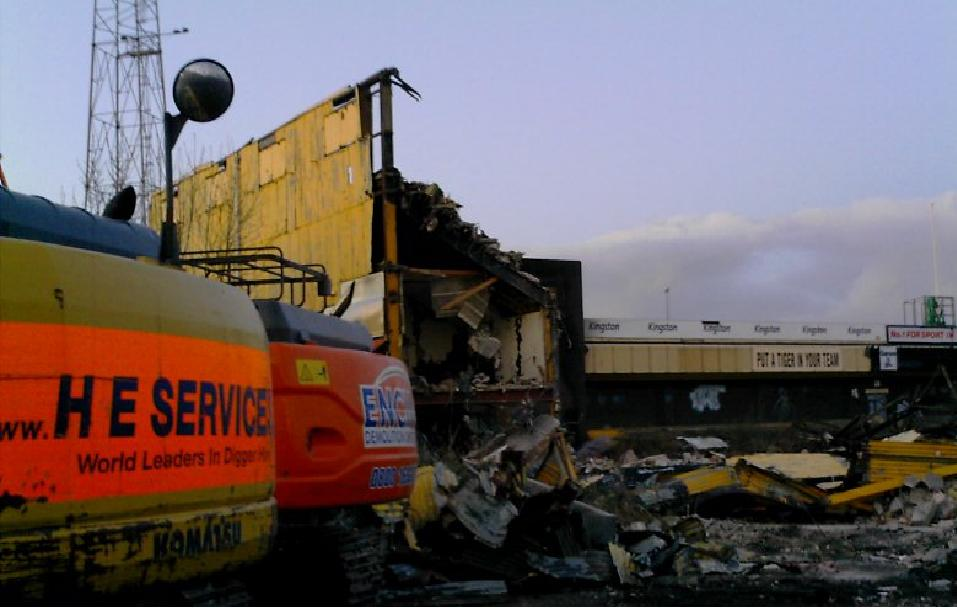
Boothferry Park being demolished in March 2008

Demolition of the ground eventually started on 10 January 2008, over five years after the final game was played there, and was completed during March. The North Stand and the terracing on the South and East Stands were eventually demolished in January 2010 after years of vandalism and arson attacks. Humberside Fire and Rescue Service had to be called out nearly 100 times during 2009 to deal with the situation. The six floodlights that had dominated the West Hull skyline were finally dismantled in early 2011.

== Boothferry Halt ==
To help transport football fans to and from games at Boothferry Park, a purpose-built railway station was constructed behind the Kempton Stand on the east side of the ground. Known as Boothferry Halt, it opened on 6 January 1951 for an FA Cup tie against Everton. Services ran on matchdays from the city's main rail terminal, Paragon Station, up until its forced closure in 1989 due to safety concerns.

== Records ==
On 26 February 1949, the visit of Manchester United in the FA Cup attracted 55,019 fans. Although Hull lost 1–0, the record still remains the highest home attendance in the club's history to this day. The highest scoring game came in a friendly match in 1950 when Hull City played Nuneaton Borough. The game ended 8–6 to the Tigers, who had been 1–0 down at half-time.

== Nicknames ==
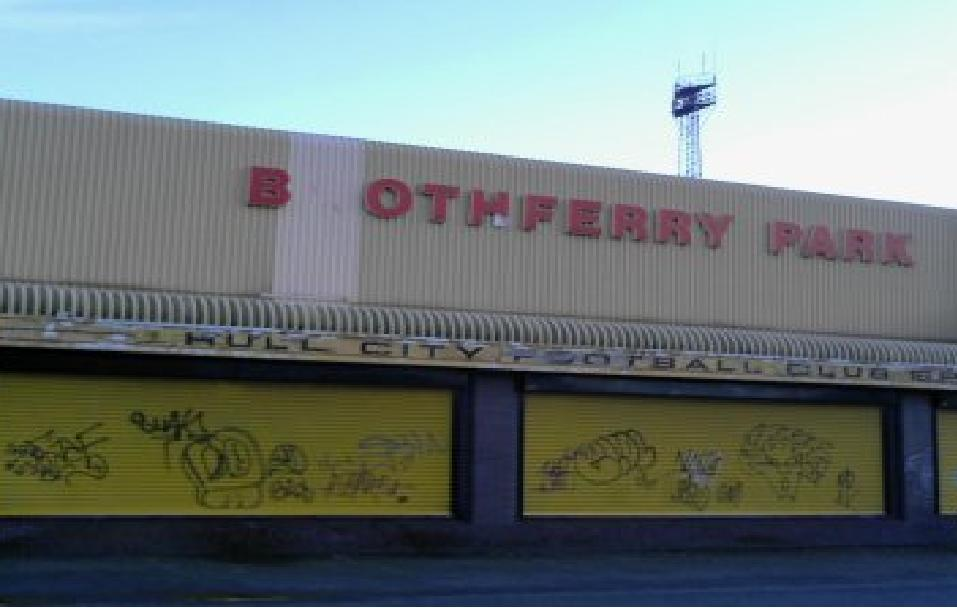
Boothferry Park from the car park with the "o" missing.

The stadium became affectionately known by supporters as "Fer Ark" in its later days, due to the lack of finances for maintenance which meant that only those letters were illuminated on the large "boothFERry pARK" signage. Before this it had been known as "Bothferry Park" when one of the illuminated "O"s fell off.

== Other sporting events ==
=== Club football ===
On 20 March 1967, Boothferry Park hosted a FA Cup fifth-round 2nd replay between Leeds United and Sunderland; it was standard procedure before the invention of the penalty shoot-out for second and subsequent replays to be held at neutral venues. 40,546 fans attended and Leeds United won 2–1 through a controversial late penalty scored by Johnny Giles.

Following a pitch invasion by their fans at West Bromwich Albion's The Hawthorns in the previous season, Leeds United returned to Boothferry Park in August 1971 after the Football Association ruled they had to play their first five home matches of the 1971–72 Football League First Division at neutral venues. Leeds played Tottenham Hotspur F.C. in the second round of fixtures on 25 August, bringing First Division football to Hull for the first time, and drew 1–1 to Tottenham via a Billy Bremner goal to a half capacity crowd of 25,099 fans mainly from Hull.

=== International football ===
England's under-23 football team played at Boothferry Park in the first international fixture played at the stadium on 10 May 1967, beating Austria's under-23 team 3–0. England's under-23s again played at the stadium in 1970 against Sweden, where they won 2–0. Their third and final fixture, by which point they had changed to a under-21 team, was played in October 1977, recording their biggest ever win at the stadium by beating Finland 8–1 via a hat-trick from Tony Woodcock.

On 16 February 1972, Boothferry Park hosted a full international match between Northern Ireland and Spain, with the latter refusing to play at Windsor Park due to The Troubles in Belfast. Northern Ireland featured George Best, Martin O'Neill, Pat Jennings, Sammy McIlroy, Pat Rice and Hull and Northern Ireland's player-manager Terry Neill. The result was drawn at 1–1, with Sammy Morgan scoring the equaliser in front of a crowd of just under 20,000; the match was due to be played later in the evening, however it was rescheduled for 15:00 due to a ban on the use of floodlights to save electricity during the 1972 United Kingdom miners' strike.

Date	Hosts	Result	Visitors	Attendance	Competition	Ref.
10 May 1967	England	3–0	Austria	20,043	U-23 international friendly	
11 November 1970	England	2–0	Sweden	17,650	U-23 international friendly	
16 February 1972	Northern Ireland	1–1	Spain	19,925	UEFA Euro 1972 qualifying Group 4	
12 October 1977	England	8–0	Finland	4,606	U-21 international friendly	

=== Rugby league ===
Boothferry Park was also the scene of a rugby league international when it hosted the first Ashes series test of the 1982 Kangaroo tour between Great Britain and Australia on 30 October. Australia ran in eight tries to nil in a 40–4 thrashing watched by a crowd of 26,771. In all, Boothferry Park hosted nine top grade rugby league matches, including five internationals, from 1980 to 1985.

Test No.	Date	Result	Attendance	Notes
1	29 February 1980	England def. Wales 26–9	7,557	1980 European Rugby League Championship
2	18 March 1981	England def. Wales 17–4	5,617	1981 European Rugby League Championship
3	6 December 1981	Great Britain def. France 37–0	13,173	1981 Great Britain vs France
4	30 October 1982	Australia def. Great Britain 40–4	26,771	1982 Ashes series – 1st Test
5	6 March 1983	Great Britain def. France 17–5	6,055	1983 Great Britain vs France

Other than the five internationals, Boothferry Park also hosted a further five top grade rugby league games.

Game No.	Date	Result	Attendance	Notes
1	3 April 1953	Hull F.C. vs Hull Kingston Rovers	27,670	
2	5 October 1980	New Zealand def. Hull F.C. 33–10	15,945	1980 New Zealand Kiwis tour
3	27 October 1984	Hull F.C. def. Hull Kingston Rovers 29–12	25,237	1984 Yorkshire Cup Final
4	5 January 1985	Hull F.C. def. Leeds 18–6	13,362	1984–85 John Player Special Trophy Semi-final
5	26 January 1985	Hull Kingston Rovers def. Hull F.C. 12–0	25,326	1984–85 John Player Special Trophy Final
