= Whitefriargate =

Street in Kingston upon Hull, England

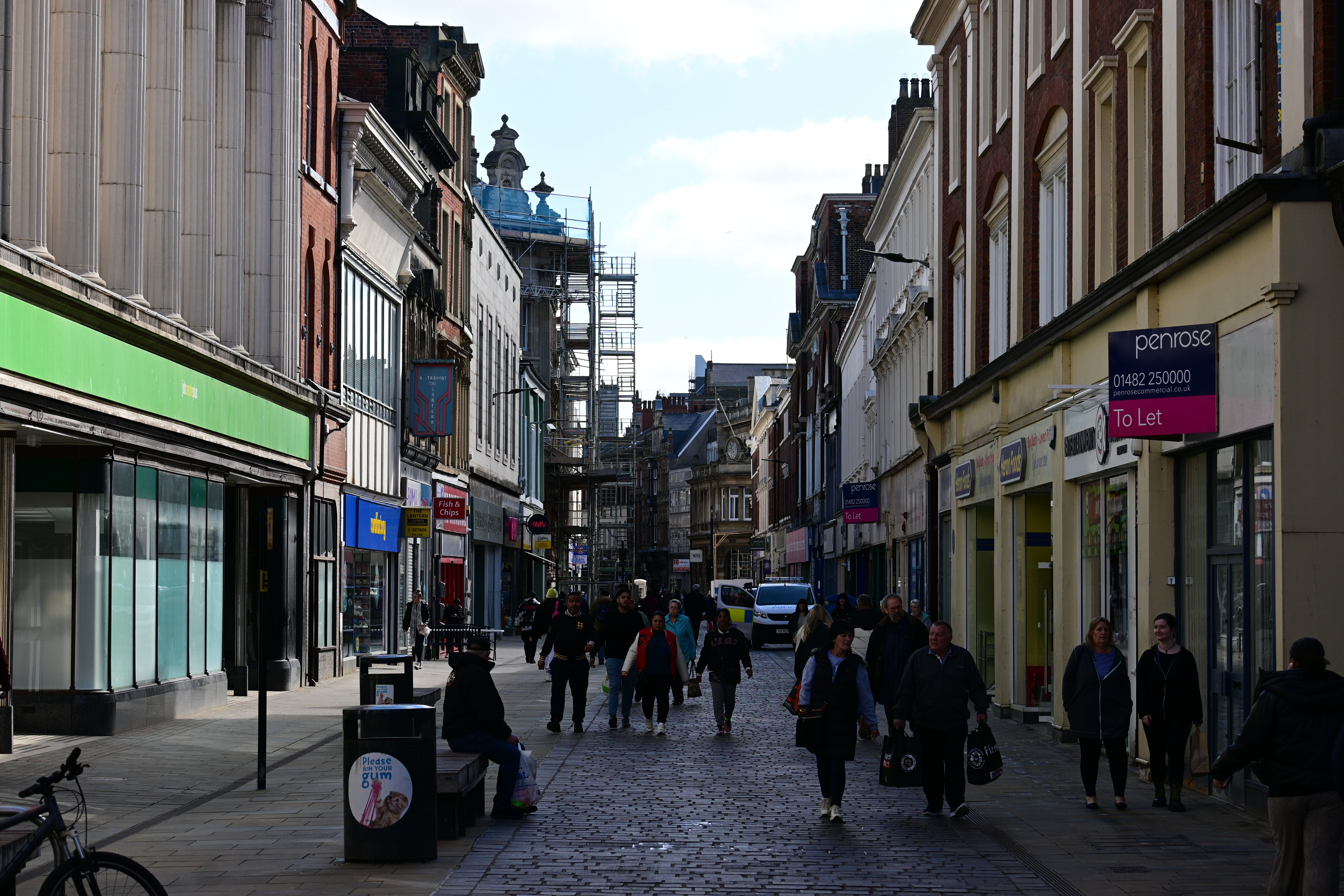
- Whitefriargate, looking east towards Silver Street

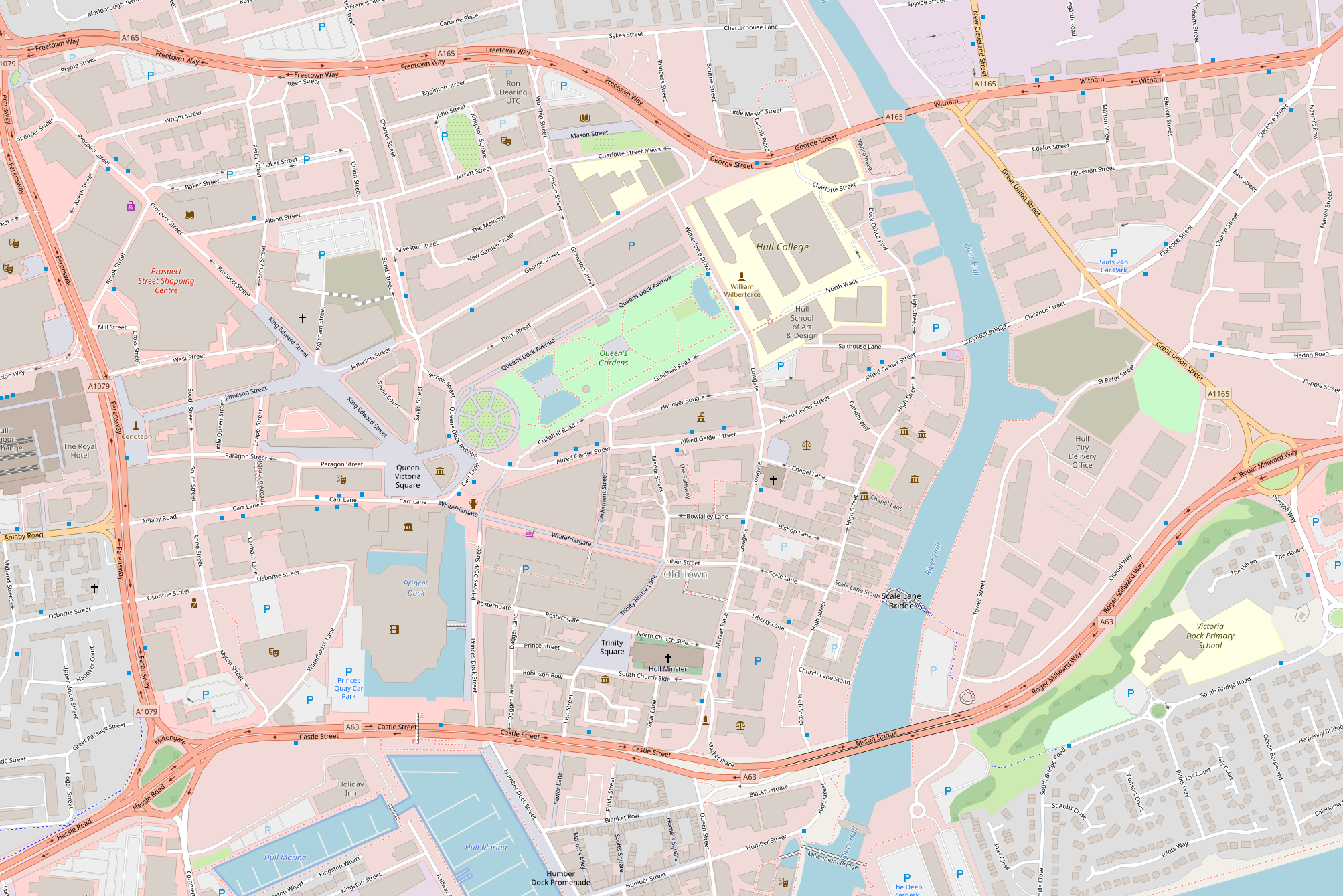
- Location within Kingston-upon-Hull
- Former names: Aldgate; Old Street
- Namesake: A Carmelite friary at the end of the street
- Location: Kingston upon Hull, East Riding of Yorkshire, England
- Coordinates: 53.743°N 0.336°W
- West end: Carr Lane/Princes Quay
- East end: Trinity House Lane

Other
- Status: Pedestrianised

Whitefriargate (Note: Also historically written as Whitefriergate.) is a pedestrianised street in the Old Town area of Kingston upon Hull, in the East Riding of Yorkshire, England. During the 20th century, it was one of the main shopping streets in the city centre, but some of the major stores have closed down, which has been attributed to out of town shopping centres. However, the Street still provides a useful link to and from the old town of Hull.

Whitefriargate has 33 listed buildings according to Historic England, and was notable for the Beverley Gate at the west end of the street, which was the place of execution of Robert Constable in 1537. Over a hundred years later in 1642, the gate was closed to King Charles I by John Hotham on the order of Parliament, which provided a catalyst for the First English Civil War.

== History ==
A Carmelite friary on the south side of the old town (Monkgate), had become overcrowded by 1304, and King Edward I offered the monks new land to the west, which was outside the town, but by the time the city walls were built in 1420, the Friary was adjacent to the Beverley Gate. Before the influence of the Carmelite friars, the street leading west from Beverley Gate was known as Aldgate (Old Street). The Carmelites were known as the White Friars on account of the colour of part of their habits, hence Whitefriargate. (Note: The Carmelites wore a white mantle over their brown habits, the Dominicans wore a black mantle. Both the terms Whitefriar and Blackfriar, have been used to define locations and areas in Britain.)

Besides Whitefriargate, there is Blackfriargate, named after the Dominican Order, but both streets are indicative of Hull's monastic history. The name is recorded to have been changed to Whitefriargate by 1347, with the eastern part of Aldgate becoming first Scale Lane, then by the 16th century, it was recorded as Silver Street.

During the 15th century, an open dike from Anlaby carried fresh water into this part of Hull, there being no guaranteed supply of fresh water in the locality. Fresh water was piped to the buildings of Whitefriargate via a system of lead pipes, however the piping was removed to pay for Hull's part in the War of the Roses, and Whitefriargate was re-paved at a cost of £28 (equivalent to £27,954 in 2025) in 1467.

In 1537, the condemned traitor Sir Robert Constable was hung in chains from Beverley Gate. Constable had been one of the leaders during the Pilgrimage of Grace; he was tried and convicted at the Tower of London, then transported back to Hull for his execution.

In April 1642, Sir John Hotham closed the Beverley Gate at the west end of Whitefriargate to King Charles I. A rebellion in Ireland had depleted the arsenal in London, so the king came to Hull (via York) for the arsenal held there that had sufficient stores to arm 16,000 men. Hotham was under instruction from Parliament not to let the king through the gate into the city. This event became a catalyst for the start of the civil war, and provided the Parliamentarian side with an advantage in terms of munitions during 1642.

The Beverley Gate was demolished c. 1776, and the site is now a scheduled monument. Around the same time that the gate was taken down, the south city wall, which ran parallel to Whitefriargate, was removed too (c. 1774–1781).During the late 18th century, the prosperity of Hull was on the increase, and this allowed the street to be developed. An Act of Parliament was granted to allow for compulsory purchase of land and properties for the building of Parliament Street, as most owners were unwilling to sell. Empty plots on Whitefriargate were sold at £5 per square yard. Hull Trinity House owned many properties in the area, with a large portion of the land that the buildings are on bequeathed to them in 1631. Trinity House rebuilt, or erected new buildings, to provide income for the association, including The Neptune Inn, which was completed in 1797.

Before many of the buildings on the street were converted into shops, they housed a myriad of civil projects such as a workhouse, almshouses, and a merchant seaman's hospital by 1781. In 1856, a pharmacist opened a shop on Whitefriargate which grew to become Smith & Nephew, an international company trading in medicinal products. Also during the second half of the 19th century, newspaper printers and offices flourished, with the Hull Free Press and Eastern Counties News, The Hull and York Times, and the Hull Evening News being based in Whitefriargate.

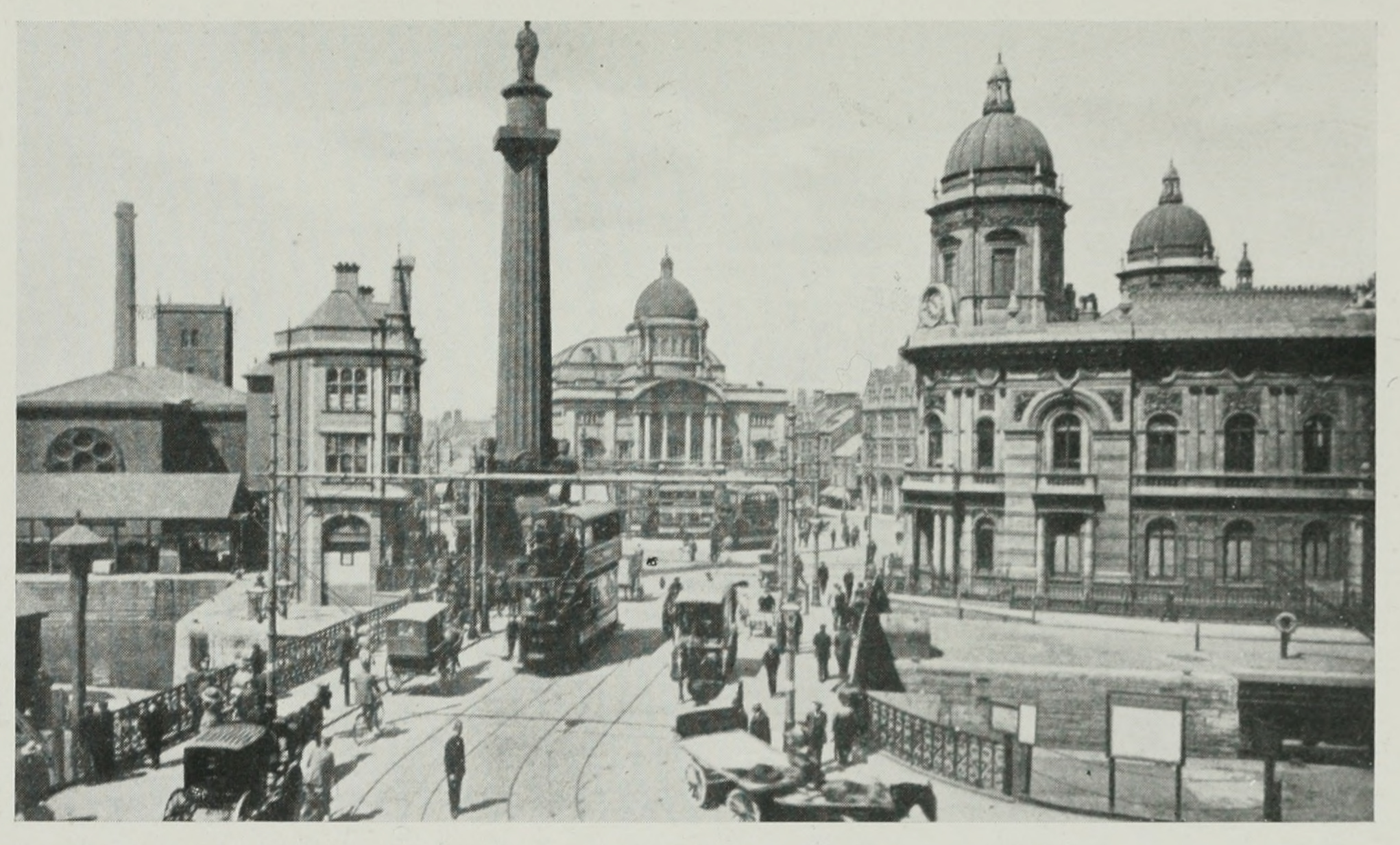
Whitefriargate bridge and Wilberforce monument. This is looking westwards.

The western end of the street used to feed into several other thoroughfares, and in the centre of this junction was the Wilberforce Monument, erected in 1834. When works were undertaken to improve traffic flow, Whitefriargate Lock Bridge (also known as Monument Bridge) was built over, and the monument was removed, being placed in front of Hull College. At the same time, the Queen's Dock, which had sea access under Whitefriargate Lock Bridge, was infilled, and turned into Queen's Gardens. In 1899, the road was installed with a tramway, which had a special provision in the plans detailing that only one tram could traverse the section over Whitefriargate and Silver Street. The trams were withdrawn in 1945.

The Marks & Spencer shop building was immortalised by Philip Larkin in his 1963 poem The Large Cool Store. Larkin was fascinated by his (largely) female staff who would return from lunchtime shopping trips on Whitefriargate, and so visited himself describing the "cheap clothes set out in simple sizes plainly...". In 1975, the street was pedestrianised, and in the 1980s during traffic calming works, the opportunity was taken to do an archaeological study on the Beverley Gate location. The archaeological site was opened to the public in 1990.

Whitefriargate is bordered to the west by Carr Lane and the Princes Quay shopping centre at Queen Victoria Square. At the east, it has a junction with the Land of Green Ginger, Silver Street and Trinity House Lane. Midway down Whitefriargate is Parliament Street, which heads north-eastwards.

Many of the shops on Whitefriargate have closed down, in part due to an economic downturn, but also losing business to out of town shopping centres opening up. One popular high street store, which closed down in 2013, cited rent prices as being too high. In May 2021, Historic England awarded Hull City Council £100,000 to promote alternative uses for the thoroughfare.

== Structures ==
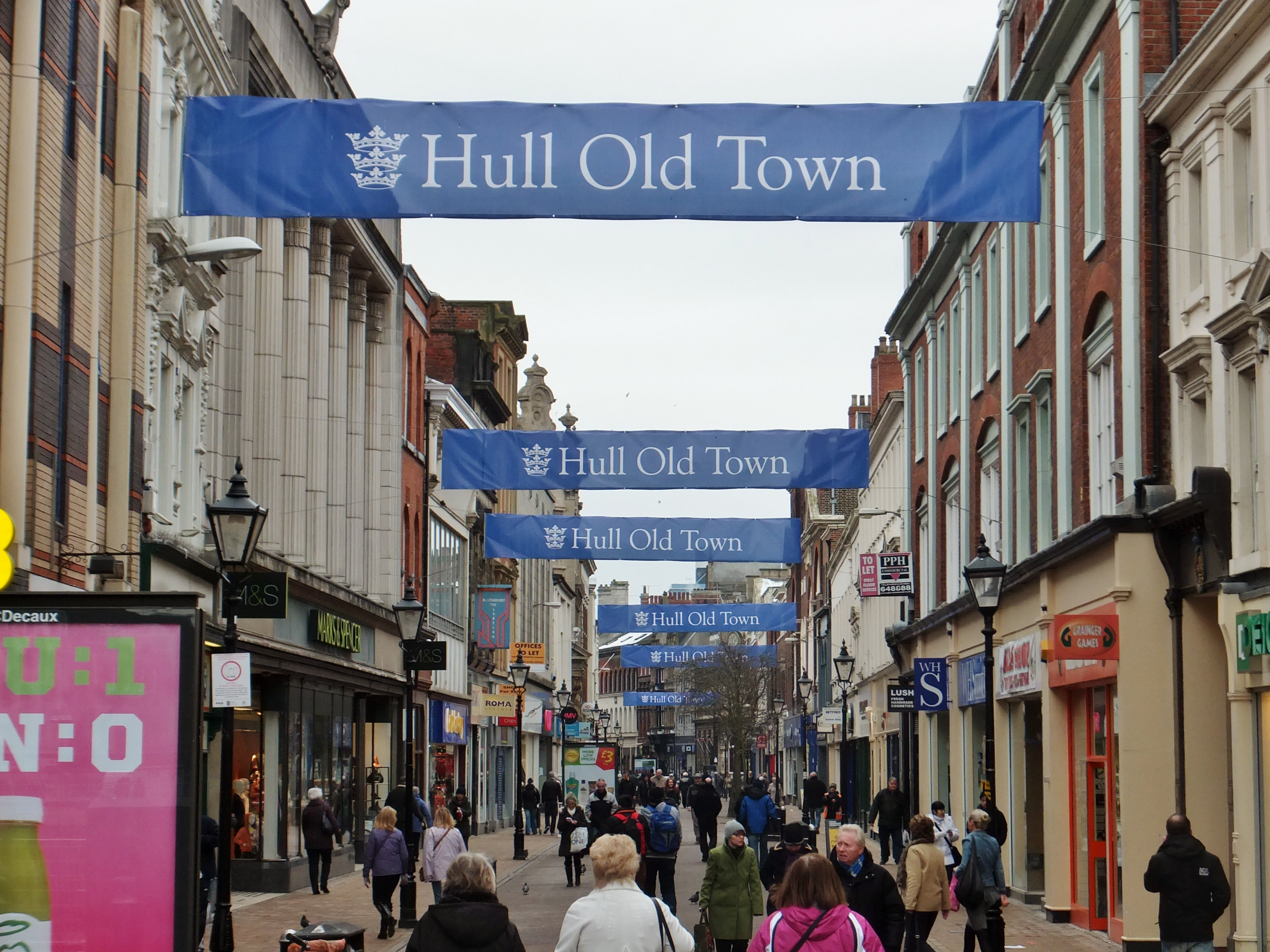
Whitefriargate prior to redevelopment in 2013

The street has 33 listed buildings. All those on the south side are listed, whereas only half on the north side are listed, being of mid-19th to mid-20th century construction.

The Neptune Inn was built in the 1790s, when most existing buildings on the street were private houses, rather than business premises. In the early 18th century besides houses, the street had gardens and stables. The stables were used to house stallions being exported through the adjacent Queen's Dock. One report from 1841 details the export of 15 horses "..of the most noted breed in Yorkshire..". Houses built in the 1730s still exist, but their frontages have changed and have been used as shops. However there was also at least five other pubs in the street such as The Cross Keys, Mr Warton's Inn, The George Inn, and The Tyger. When Trinity House decided to build The Neptune Inn, they asked architects to submit their designs, and George Pycock won, with building starting in 1794. However, the build was beset by problems of wage and labour, coupled with uncertainty as by that time, the French Revolutionary Wars were ongoing. The Neptune Inn was supposed to be a grand coaching house with its position picked deliberately, and a central archway with an over-arched Venetian window above. The building looks down Parliament Street towards what would have been Queen's Dock. By 1815, the inn had closed and the building was used instead as a custom house. The rents demanded by the board were deemed to be too high during a period of instability, and so the venture failed. In the 1930s, the building was leased to the Boots chain, but only the ground and first floors were used. In 2019, Boots vacated the building, and in January 2022, Trinity House announced that they intended to convert upper parts of the building into luxury flats.

The former Marks & Spencer building which Philip Larkin wrote about, has a 1931 frontage by Jones & Rigby in a Greek Revival design. The first and second floors are set back behind six fluted columns, and the parapets are stylized with the prows of ships and ocean waves. Pevsner described the building as "a great contrast to fussy Victorian Renaissance faced of No. 39 [to the left]". The store, though now closed, features in the Larkin Trail, a tour across the city featuring haunts of Philip Larkin and the places that inspired him.

A later pub at the western end of the street was known as The Monument Tavern. Between 1820 and 1851, it changed its name four times; first it was Old Andrew Marvel [sic], then the York Tavern, Wilberforce Wine Vaults, and finally the Monument Tavern. The pub closed in the 1960s. The 17th century metaphysical poet Andrew Marvell was known to use Whitefriargate as a thoroughfare.

No. 61 Whitefriargate was the shop that Thomas James Smith took on as a going concern in 1856. It was here that Smith developed a purer and better tasting form of cod liver oil, by refining the product, mixing it with other oils and leaving it out on the roof to be bleached by the sun. Though not listed, numbers 63 to 66 on the street were designed and built in 1934 by A. L. Farman in the Moderne style. It has sun-trap windows and originally housed a branch of British Home Stores. The building was extended in 1956 in the same style.

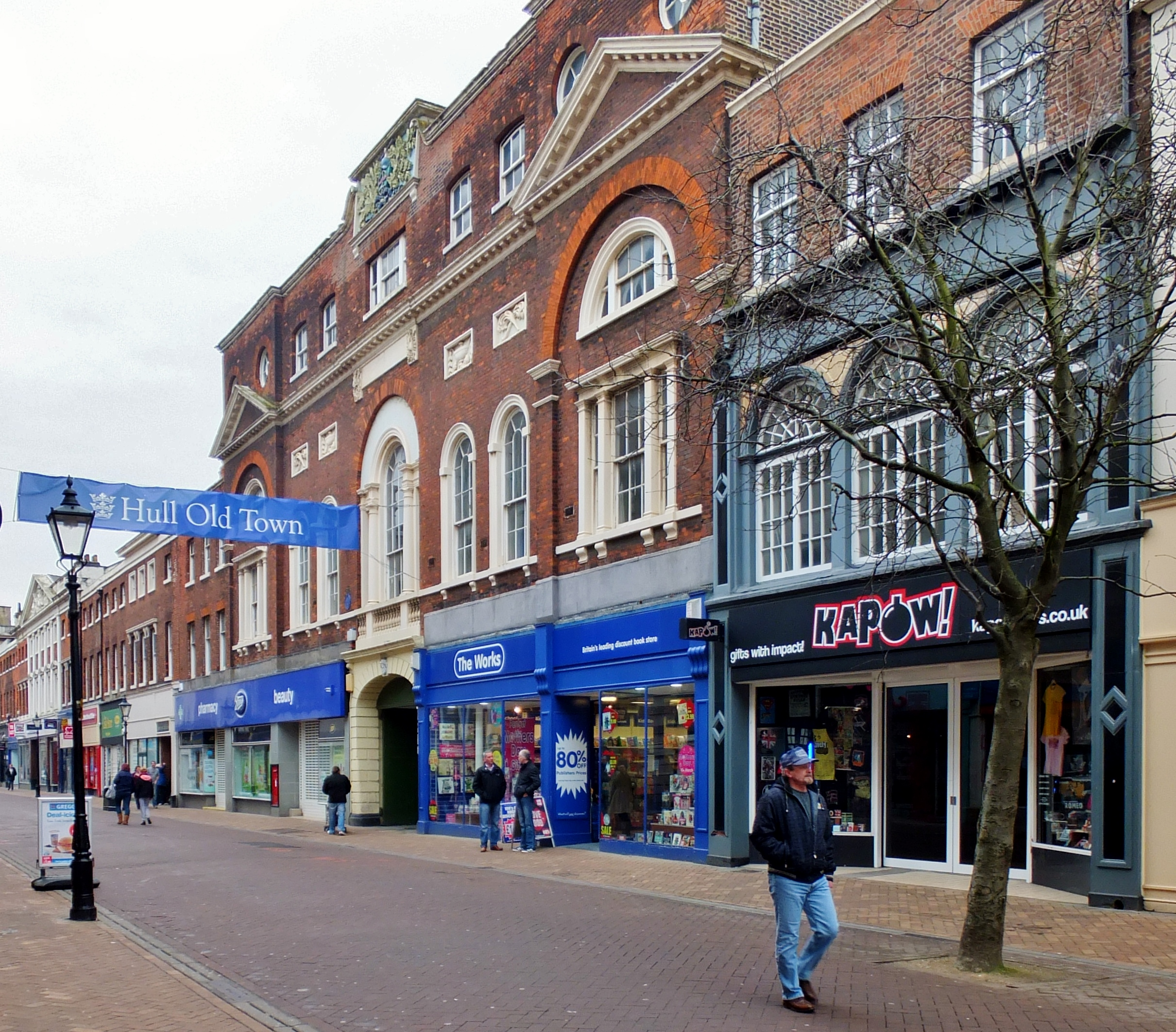
10–15 Whitefriargate Hull, built as the Neptune Inn

Listed buildings on Whitefriargate
Description	Grade	Ref	Description	Grade	Ref
1, 2 and 3, Whitefriargate (2, Trinity House Lane)	II		30–33 Whitefriargate	II	
4, 5 and 6 Whitefriargate	II		Former Burton's Department Store and Offices, Numbers 34–35 Whitefriargate and 6–10 Alfred Gelder Street	II	
7, 8, and 9 Whitefriargate	II		39 Whitefriargate	II	
10–15 Whitefriargate	II*		40–43 Whitefriargate	II	
16–19 Whitefriargate	II		46, 47 and 48 Whitefriargate	II	
20 Whitefriargate	II		52 and 53, Whitefriargate, (15 Parliament Street)	II	
21, 22 and 23 Whitefriargate	II		Former Midland Bank 55 Whitefriargate	II	
24–28 Whitefriargate	II		67 Whitefriargate	II	
