= Boothferry Park Halt railway station =

Disused railway station in Kingston upon Hull, England

Boothferry Park Halt

General information
- Location: Kingston upon Hull, East Riding of Yorkshire; England
- Coordinates: 53.7416°N 0.3870°W
- Grid reference: TA063284
- Platforms: 1

Other information
- Status: Disused

History
- Original company: North Eastern Region of British Railways

Key dates
- 6 January 1951: Opened
- 16 September 1989: Closed
Location

Boothferry Park Halt railway station opened on 6 January 1951 on an embankment of the former Hull and Barnsley Railway to serve the Boothferry Park football stadium which had opened in Kingston upon Hull, East Riding of Yorkshire in August 1946.

The station was first used for an FA Cup third round match between Hull City A.F.C. and Everton F.C. on 6 January 1951, when six trains ran the football service at ten minute intervals between Hull Paragon and Boothferry Park. The first train to arrive at the new station was a LNER Thompson Class B1 numbered 61080, carrying 595 supporters on the 12:54 service from Hull Paragon.

The station closed for home Hull City supporters in September 1986 due to a lack of funding. Despite it being threatened with closure due to Hull City refusing to pay British Rail for its upkeep, it was kept open for away supporters of clubs known for football hooliganism during 1987 following campaigning that its closure would result in fans causing disorder in Hull city centre. The last chartered train for Hull City supporters was for a 1988–89 FA Cup fifth round fixture against Liverpool F.C., while the very last train to run from Boothferry Park Halt was chartered by the police for Leeds United F.C. supporters for a 1989–90 Football League Second Division match on 16 September 1989.

The station was a single platform, 200 yards (180 m) long. It was removed in October 2007 by Network Rail during engineering work.

Boothferry Park Halt railway station was the first in England built to provide a dedicated match-day service to a football ground; others included Manchester United Football Ground, Watford Stadium, Ramsline Halt in Derby, and the first Wembley Stadium station. When Boothferry Park was demolished and redeveloped into housing, a street running parallel to the site of the station was named Boothferry Park Halt.
