= Harry Hudson Rodmell =

English painter

Harry Hudson Rodmell (28 May 1896 – 3 March 1984) was an English painter and Commercial artist, specialising in marine art. He studied at Hull School of Art before enlisting in the Royal Engineers during World War I. After demobilisation, he was recruited by Ronald Massey, a London agent seeking nautical illustrations for publicity material. Subsequently, he produced work for many of the major shipping lines including P & O, Canadian Pacific and the British India Line. His longest running commission was a series of calendars for the tugboat company William Watkins Ltd.

After serving with the Royal Observer Corps during World War II, his graphic design work was largely replaced by commissioned oil paintings of new vessels. These were often produced from plans so that a painting could be completed before the vessel was launched.
