= John Alexander Parks =

British painter

- Born: John Alexander Parks; 1952 (age 73–74); Leeds, England
- Education: Royal College of Art, London
- Known for: Painting
- Awards: National Endowment of the Arts (1987)

John Alexander Parks (born January 1952), also known as John Parks, is a British painter, resident in the United States since 1976. A graduate of the Royal College of Art, London, he has exhibited his painting in the US and the UK since the late seventies. His work is represented in the collections of the Victoria and Albert Museum in London and the Museum of the Rhode Island School of Design as well as many private collections.

== Early life and career ==
John Parks was born the son of the Rev. Harold Parks and Joan Parks (née McDowell) in Leeds England in 1952, one of three siblings. His younger brother, Tim Parks, is a novelist and critic.

Parks was educated at Woodhouse College in London before attending Hull College of Art and then the Royal College of Art where he studied under Leonard Rosoman. He exhibited twice at the Royal Academy Summer Exhibitions while still at the Royal College. In 1974 he was awarded a scholarship to the Skowhegan School of Painting and Sculpture, where he met his future wife, Melanie Marder. The couple lived in London for two years where Parks completed the Pears Portrait Commission as well as a number of private portrait commissions. They moved to New York in late 1976.

From 1977 onwards Parks exhibited his work with the Allan Stone Gallery in New York City mounting one man shows in 1979, 1980, 1982, 1984 and 1987. In 1990 and 1992 he mounted exhibitions at Coe Kerr Gallery, New York. He returned to Allan Stone Gallery in 1995 and mounted a last exhibition there in 2005. His work is currently represented by 532 Gallery Thomas Jaeckel in New York

Parks was awarded a grant from the National Endowment of the Arts in 1987.

Parks has been a member of the faculty of the School of Visual Arts in New York since 1979 where he has taught courses in drawing, gouache painting, realist techniques and portrait painting. He and his wife have one son, Alexander Parks, born 1987.

=== Works ===
Parks’ work has focused largely on British themes, first in small scale realist paintings of London suburbs from the mid-seventies to the early eighties, and later in larger scale more expressionist paintings of the mid-eighties. The latter featured images of British public imagery including guardsmen, policemen and buildings such as Buckingham Palace and the Houses of Parliament. A 2005 exhibition featured reworkings of quintessential English imagery such as hunting scenes, polo players, castles and steam trains. His recent work has often included paintings executed with his fingers, including a suite of paintings recreating his English childhood exhibited in New York in 2012.

He has also written many feature articles in various art magazines including pieces on Raphael, Goya, Philip Pearlstein and David Beck. He is the author of one book, “Universal Principles of Art,” (Rockport Publishing, 2014), a broad introduction to the world of art.

== Filmography ==
- The Progress of Love 2011
