= Land of Green Ginger =

Street in Kingston upon Hull, England

Coordinates: 53.74310°N 0.33429°W

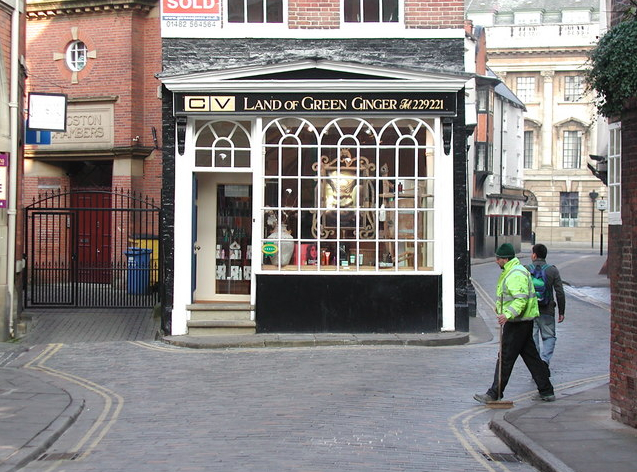
Hairdresser's shop at the corner of Manor Street and the Land of Green Ginger

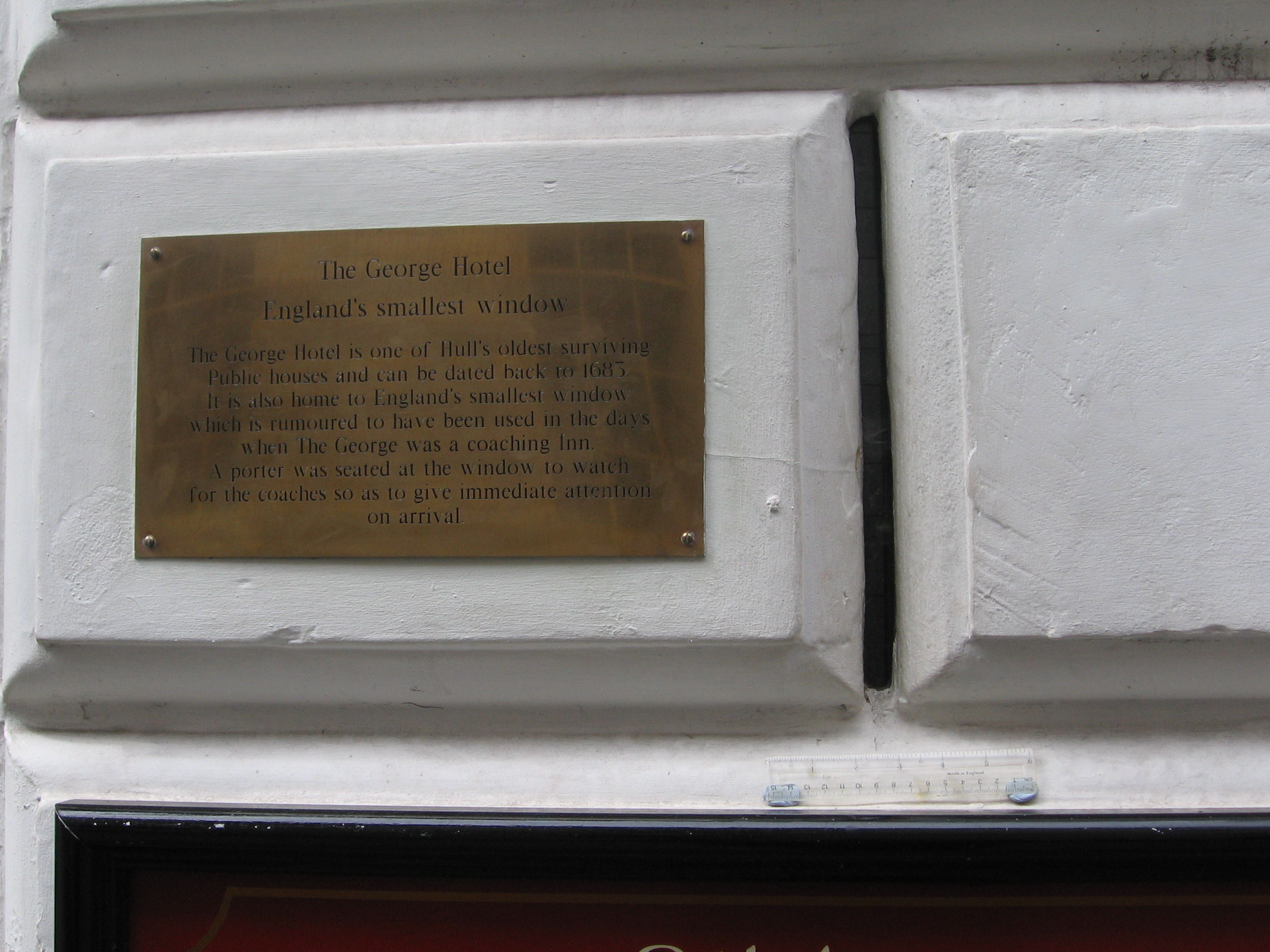
Possibly England's smallest window at the George Hotel

The Land of Green Ginger (grid reference TA099287) is a narrow street at the bottom of Whitefriargate in the old town area of Kingston upon Hull, England. There are various commercial and residential buildings along the street. The Land of Green Ginger contains what may be the world's smallest window, being a slit which was used by the gatekeeper of the George Hotel to look out for stagecoaches and customers.

The street was formerly known as Old Beverley Street. Various suggestions have been proposed for the derivation of its current name. It may simply refer to the sale or storage of the spice ginger in the Middle Ages. A record dating from 1853 indicates that a Mr Richardson "has made it most probable that the designation 'Land of Green Ginger' took place betwixt 1640 and 1735". The unknown writer then goes on to speculate that, as a Dutch family with the surname Lindegreen (meaning "green lime tree") was known to live in Hull during the earlier part of the 19th century, the modern name may be a corruption of Lindegroen jonger (Lindegreen junior). Another idea, dating from 1880, is that the name is a corruption of "Landgrave Granger", meaning a walk or pathway approaching the home of the Landgrave family.

In 2017, Hull UK City of Culture commissioned a community engagement project, called Land of Green Ginger. It was presented in the form of a series of Acts of Wanton Wonder, united under an overarching narrative. The projects were developed and delivered with artists who worked both independently and in collaboration to bring new kinds of art and culture into the neighbourhoods outside the city centre. Act I was 7 Alleys, Act II was The Golden Nose of Green Ginger, Act III The Longhill Burn, Act IV Re-Rediffusions Voice Park, Act V Micropolis by Davy and Kristin McGuire and Act VI Land of Green Ginger Unleashed.

In 2022, Hull Trains named one of their Class 802 Paragon trains 'Land of Green Ginger' after the street.

== Media and the arts ==
- The Land of Green Ginger is a 1927 novel by Winifred Holtby.
- The Tale of the Land of Green Ginger is a 1937 novel by Noel Langley.
- Land of Green Ginger is a BBC Play for Today by Alan Plater about Hull, televised in 1973.
- "The Land of Green Ginger" is a track on the 2004 album Bicycles and Tricycles by The Orb.
- The Land of Green Ginger was a participatory art project that explored encounters between refugees living in Hull and their host communities during 2008.
- The Land of Green Ginger features in Beatrix Potter's 1929 novel The Fairy Caravan. The story opens: "In The Land of Green Ginger there is a town called Marmalade, which is inhabited exclusively by guinea-pigs."
- The Land of Green Ginger is a supernatural short story by Algernon Blackwood, first published in 1927. It is set in a fictitious junk shop on the street and deals with an ancient Chinese mirror and its influence on a passer-by's life.

== See also ==
- Green ginger wine
- Gladstone's Land
- Artemisia absinthium a species of wormwood known as "Green Ginger".
