= Hull School of Art and Design =

Art school in England

Coordinates: 53.7455°N 0.3320°W

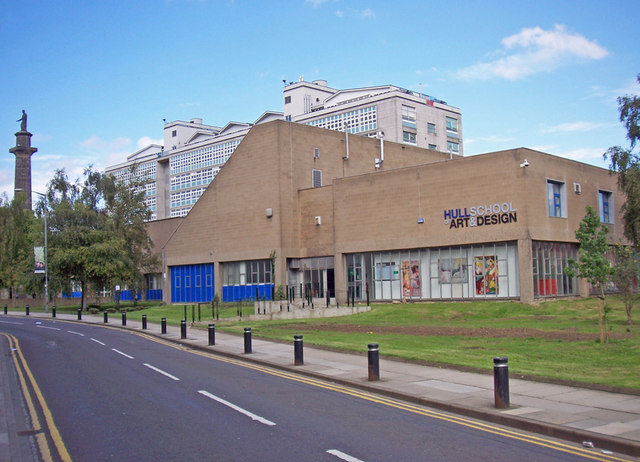
- Type: Art School
- Established: 1861; 165 years ago
- Academic affiliation: Hull College
- Website: https://pages.akerolabs.com/7zck8/hull-college/art-and-design

The Hull School of Art and Design (previously the Hull School of Art) is an art school in Kingston upon Hull, in the East Riding of Yorkshire, England.

== History ==
Founded in 1861, classes were originally given in a suite of upstairs chambers at the Public Assembly Rooms, now the New Theatre. In 1878, the School of Art had moved to a Georgian town house on Albion Street. In 1901, an Anlaby Road site was acquired from the North Eastern Railway Company, and an architectural competition advertised. The winning design for a new Hull School of Art was produced by the Bloomsbury firm of Lanchester, Stewart and Rickards; the building was completed in April 1905.

In 1930 the school at Anlaby Road became Hull College of Arts and Crafts. In 1962 the College was renamed the Regional College of Art and Design, and began to offer a syllabus leading to the newly recognised Diploma in Art and Design (DipAD). In 1972 a new Art College Building on Queens Gardens was commissioned, designed by the Architectural Partnership of Frederick Gibberd. This building received its first students in September 1974, and offered honours degrees in Fine Art and Graphic Design.

The amalgamation of the local authority's higher education provision commenced in 1976 with the foundation of Hull College of Higher Education. It was later renamed the University of Humberside and entered into alliance with higher education institutions in Lincoln. The resulting University of Lincolnshire and Humberside came into being in 1996, and underwent a further name change in 2001 when it became the University of Lincoln. Renamed as the Hull School of Art and Design, the school is now a part of Hull College Group.

== Alumni ==
- Simon Goddard
- Alfred Garth Jones
- Ted Lewis
- John Alexander Parks
- Professor David Remfry MBE RA studied Painting and Printmaking from 1959 to 1964. His tutor was Gerald Harding.
- Harry Hudson Rodmell
- Theresa Tomlinson
- Vanessa Winship
- Andrew Voller, E.M.A. Psychology founder.
