= Hull College =

Further education college in England

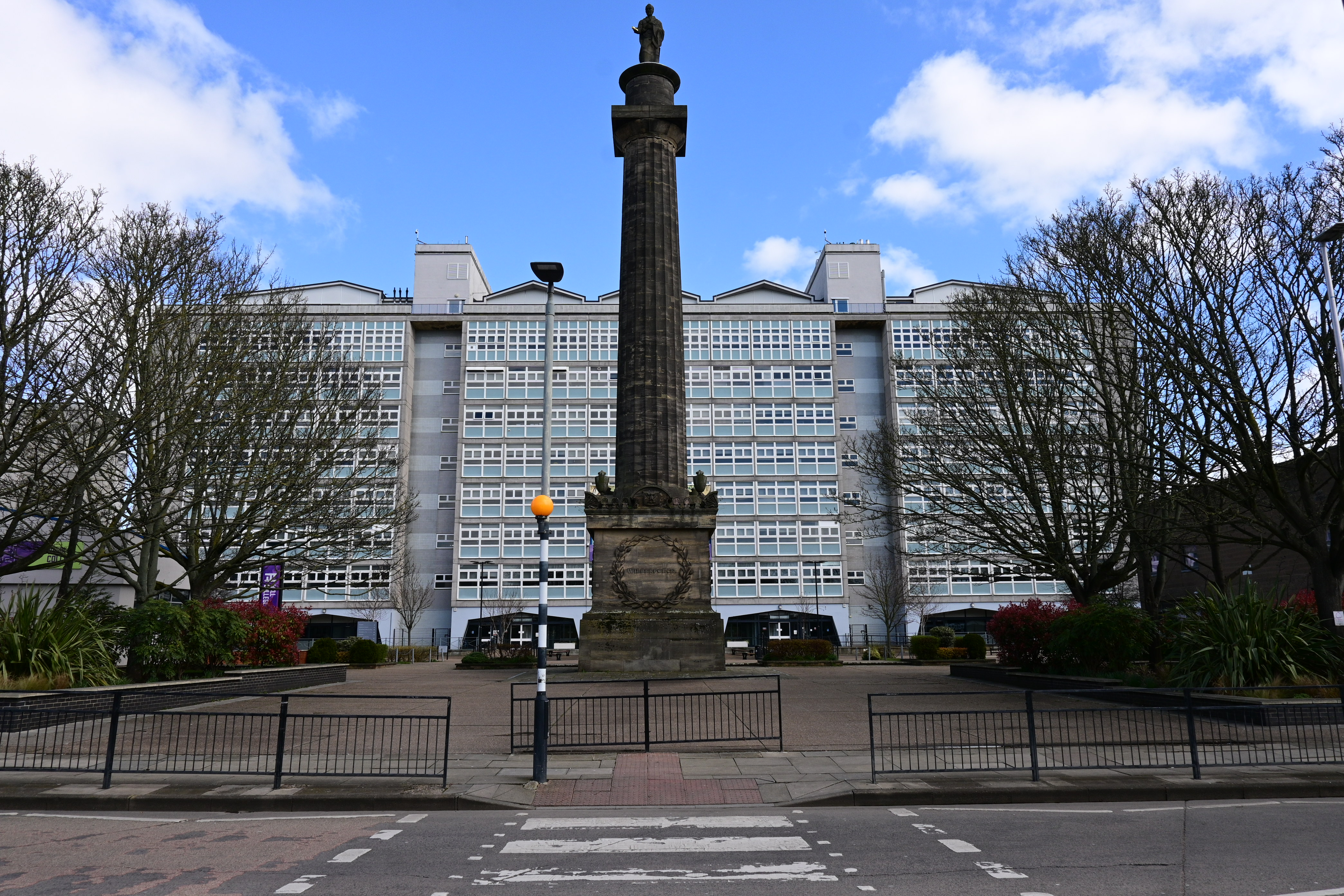
- Hull College's tower block and the Wilberforce Monument overlooking Queen's Gardens, April 2023

Location
- Queen's Gardens; Hull, East Riding of Yorkshire, HU1 3DG; England; 53.746280°N 0.332400°W

Information
- Type: Further Education College
- Department for Education URN: 130579 Tables
- Ofsted: Reports
- CEO: Debra Gray MBE
- Gender: Mixed
- Age: Mainly Post 16 to No Upper Limit
- Enrolment: 28,000
- Website: hull-college.ac.uk

Hull College is a Further Education and Higher Education establishment based in Kingston upon Hull, England.

It provides vocational courses, apprenticeships, Higher Education and adult learning courses, with a focus on equipping young people and adults with the skills needed for long-term career success. The college has approximately 2,100 adult learners, 1,600 learners aged 16 to 18, 1,000 apprentices, 167 learners aged 14 to 16, and 109 learners with high needs.

The college operates from three sites. Its main campus is located at Queen's Gardens, with satellite sites at Cannon Street and the Steve Prescott Centre.

The college was awarded a 'Good' Ofsted rating following a full enhanced skills inspection that took place in late October 2023. The organisation was also recognised for its exceptional contribution to meeting skills needs, earning the highest accolade of 'Strong'.

In the report, inspectors rated a range of provision types with Personal Development and Adult Learning Programmes judged to be 'Outstanding' and Education Programmes for Young People, Quality of Education, Behaviour and Attitudes, Provision for Learners with High Needs, Apprenticeships, and Leadership and Management all given a rating of 'Good'.

== History ==
Hull College is operated by Hull College Group, which operates three centres in the city located in Queen's Gardens, Cannon Street, and the Steve Prescott Centre.

The main bulk of courses in Hull are run in an eight-storey tower block overlooking Queen's Gardens. Built in the 1950s, the block is an example of brutalist architecture. An £11 million extension housing a learning resource centre was opened in 2004 and financed jointly by Yorkshire Forward and the Learning and Skills Council. During the construction of this in 2003, a time capsule was buried within its foundations. There is also a smaller building situated next to the tower block, known as the Wilberforce. In 2012, this was converted into the Hull Studio School. Following the school's closure in 2014, the building was reverted into classrooms for further education courses. The site is also home to the Hull School of Art and Design, which was founded in 1861 and currently offers higher education courses. The school is housed in 1970s buildings, adjacent to the tower block. Further education courses in Art and Design were previously offered at the college's former Park Street site until June 2016, when the building was sold off. There is a monument dedicated to politician William Wilberforce, a 102-foot (31 m) Greek Doric column topped by a statue of Wilberforce stands in the Queen's Gardens grounds. In 1967, the college took over the former Carthusian monastery known as the Charterhouse, converting part of the building into an annex of the college. By 2015, the site had been relinquished. In 2003, the college unveiled a building known as the Horncastle as part of the Queen's Gardens site. Housing drama, media and musical courses, it has a 200-seat theatre allowing performing arts students to put on shows for the general public. Students also have access to drama studios, a radio suite and an operational television studio. Architects DLA Interiors were responsible for the design of all public areas, including the refectory and classrooms.

In June 2009, plans for an expansive £80 million rebuild of the college buildings were halted by the British Government. The Queen's Gardens site was one of a number of colleges expected to be given the go-ahead for building projects under the Building Schools for the Future programme. Plans included the demolition of the main tower block and the provision of modern facilities that would house workshops, laboratories, kitchens, salons and a sports centre. The whole programme would eventually be terminated in July 2010.

In November 2014, the Hull College Group announced that they would be taking over the University of Hull Scarborough campus. The University of Hull had since 2000 offered higher education on its satellite campus in Scarborough. In January 2016, it was revealed that the college had 'pulled out' of buying the campus for unknown reasons, although it is suggested that very poor student recruitment was a factor.

A November 2015 Ofsted report rated Hull College as 'good' in terms of its overall effectiveness. The college is a member of the Collab Group of high-performing further-education institutions. In June 2017, the college was awarded a bronze rating by the Teaching Excellence Framework (TEF) according to their standard of undergraduate teaching.

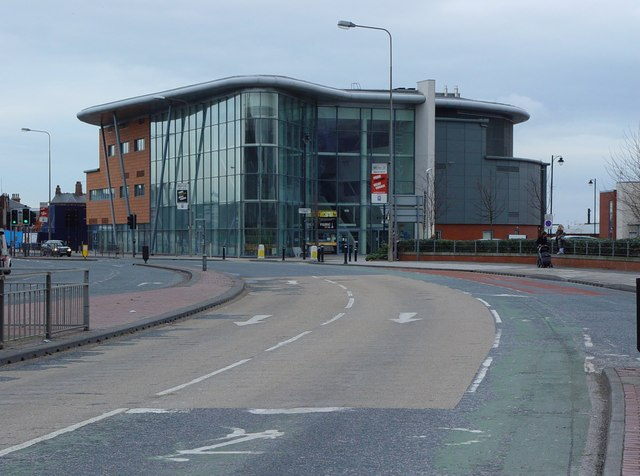
The Horncastle building at Hull College, January 2008

In August 2019 Harrogate College transferred to Luminate Education Group (formerly Leeds City College Group).

The College is currently under investigation for allegations of financial mismanagement and nepotism.

== Management ==
The chief executive of Hull College Group was Michelle Swithenbank. She was made the chief executive on a permanent basis in June 2017, having served the role temporarily from March 2017. She took a leave of absence from the College to allow investigations into allegations of financial mismanagement and nepotism but later resigned in December 2019 following these investigations.

Before February 2017, the principal of Hull College was Graham Towse. Towse had joined the college in 1996 and took up the post as principal in April 2013, after an interim period as deputy principal at nearby Grimsby Institute. On 10 October 2016, it was announced that Towse would be leaving the college in February 2017 due to 'personal reasons'. Leaving alongside him would be Antony Sutton, chief operating officer and former chief executive of Hull FC.

In August 2021, Chris Malish, who was appointed principal in April 2021, resigned for personal reasons.

In December 2021, Debra Gray MBE was announced as the new principal to take up the position on 4 April 2022.

Under the management of Gray, the college achieved its first Ofsted 'Good' rating since 2015 following a full enhanced skills inspection in October 2023.

== Courses ==
The college offers courses in the following subjects: Art and Design, Business, Catering and Hospitality, Construction, Criminology, Digital Technology and IT, ESOL, Early Years, Electrical, Engineering, English and maths, Esports, Foundation and SEND, Hair and Beauty, Health and Social Care, Motor Vehicle, Music and Performing Arts, Science, Sport and Uniformed Protective Services, Travel and Tourism and Welding and Fabrication.
