= Parliament Street, Hull =

Street in Hull, East Riding of Yorkshire, England

Hull Improvement Act 1795
- Act of Parliament
- Parliament of Great Britain
- Long title: An Act for laying out and making a new street from Whitefriar-gate to the south end of Quay-street, within the town and county of the town of Kingston-upon-Hull.
- Citation: 35 Geo. 3. c. 46
- Territorial extent: Great Britain

Dates
- Royal assent: 28 April 1795
- Commencement: 28 April 1795 (Note: The Acts of Parliament (Commencement) Act 1793.)

Status: Current legislation

Text of statute as originally enacted

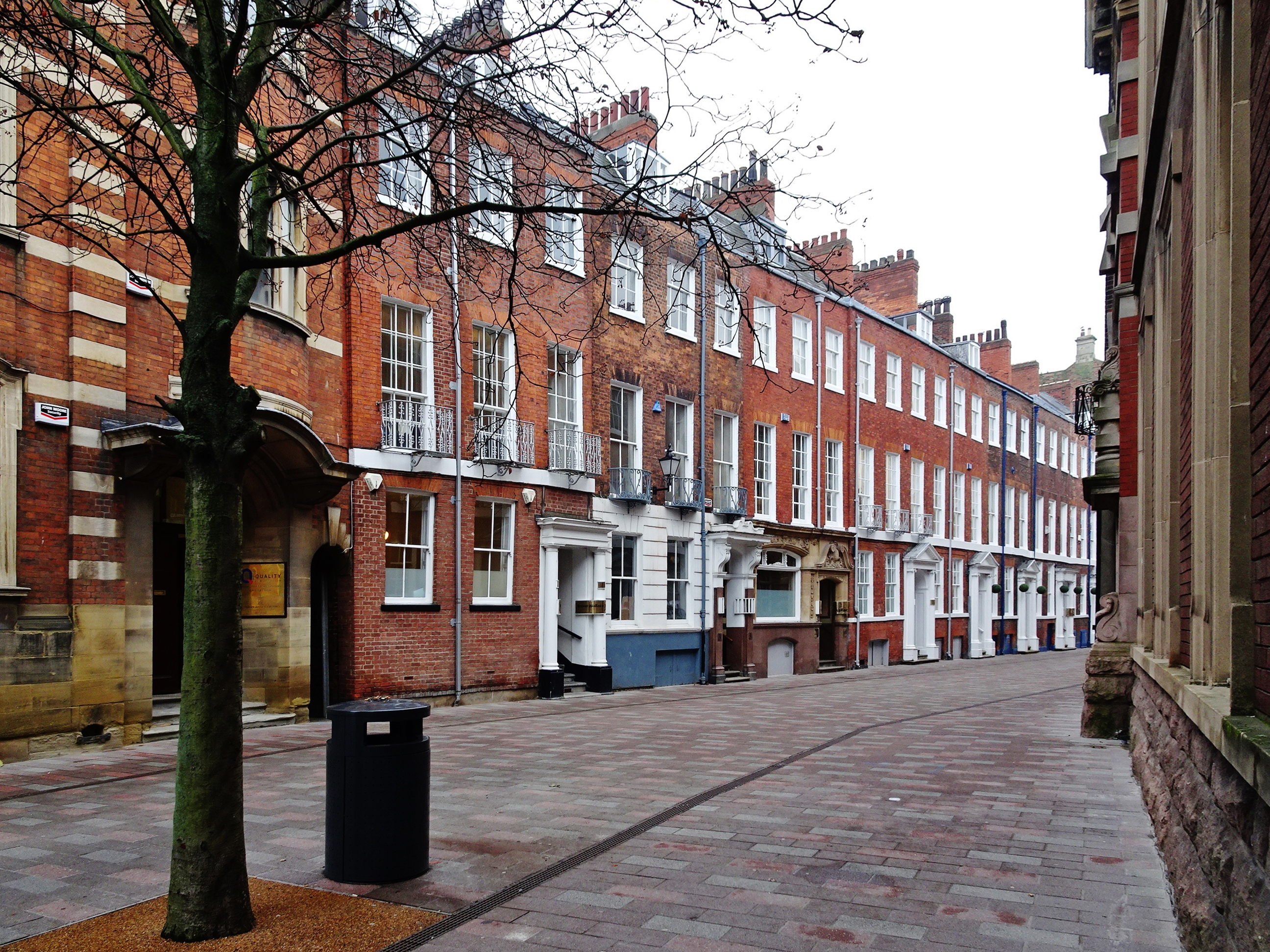
Parliament Street, 2018

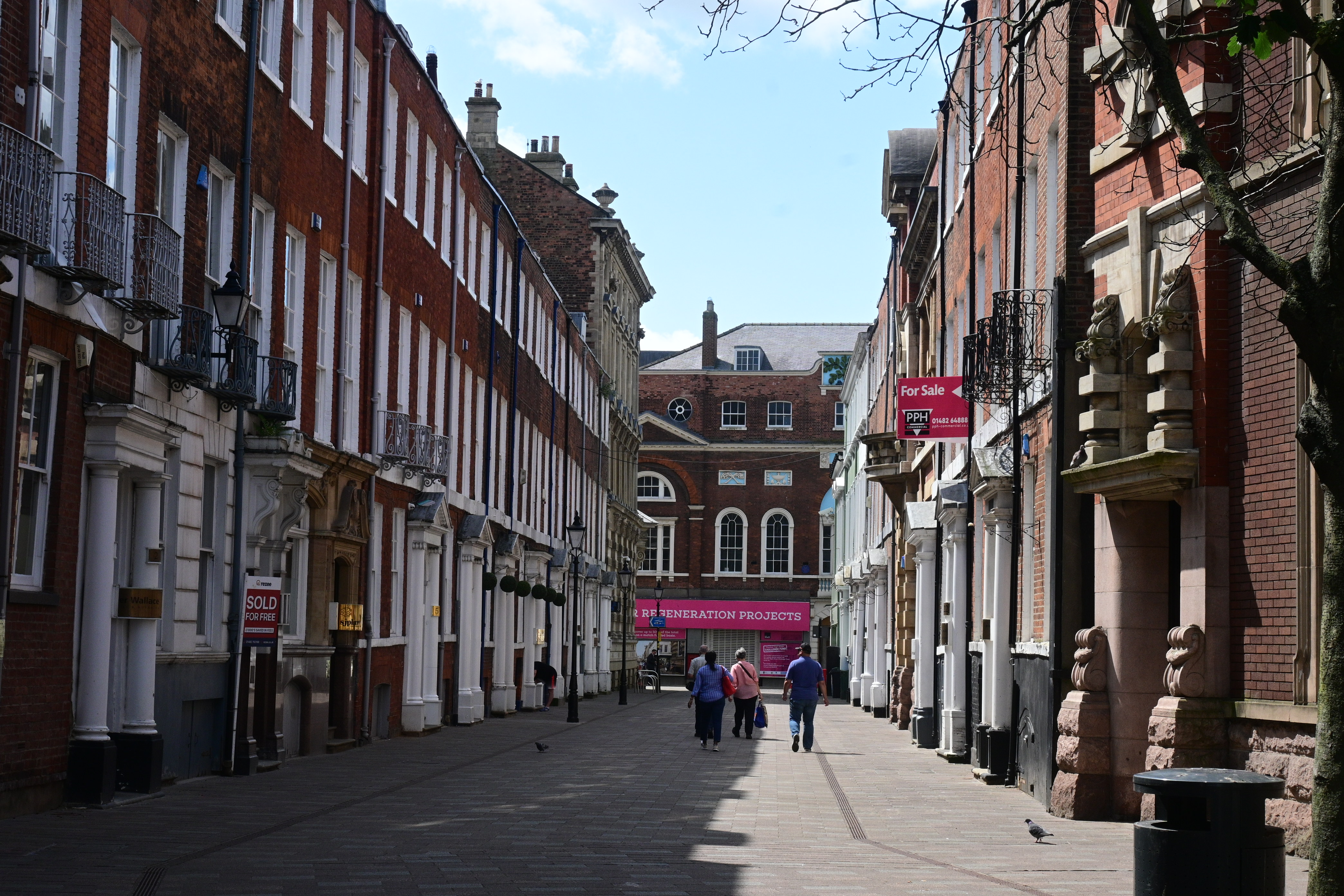
Parliament Street looking south towards Whitefriargate, 2023

Parliament Street is a short pedestrianised road in Kingston upon Hull in East Riding of Yorkshire, England, running northwards off Whitefriargate in the centre of the city. It is noted for its eighteenth century buildings and has been described as "the most complete Georgian street in Hull". Authorised by an act of Parliament, the Hull Improvement Act 1795 (35 Geo. 3. c. 46), it was constructed to link Whitefriargate with the newly constructed Princes Quay dock. A number of buildings in the street are now listed.

== Bibliography ==
- Neave, David & Pevsner, Nikolaus. Yorkshire: York and the East Riding. Yale University Press, 1995.
- Tyack, Geoffrey. The Making of Our Urban Landscape. Oxford University Press, 2022.
