= Wilberforce Monument =

Monument in Kingston Upon Hull, England

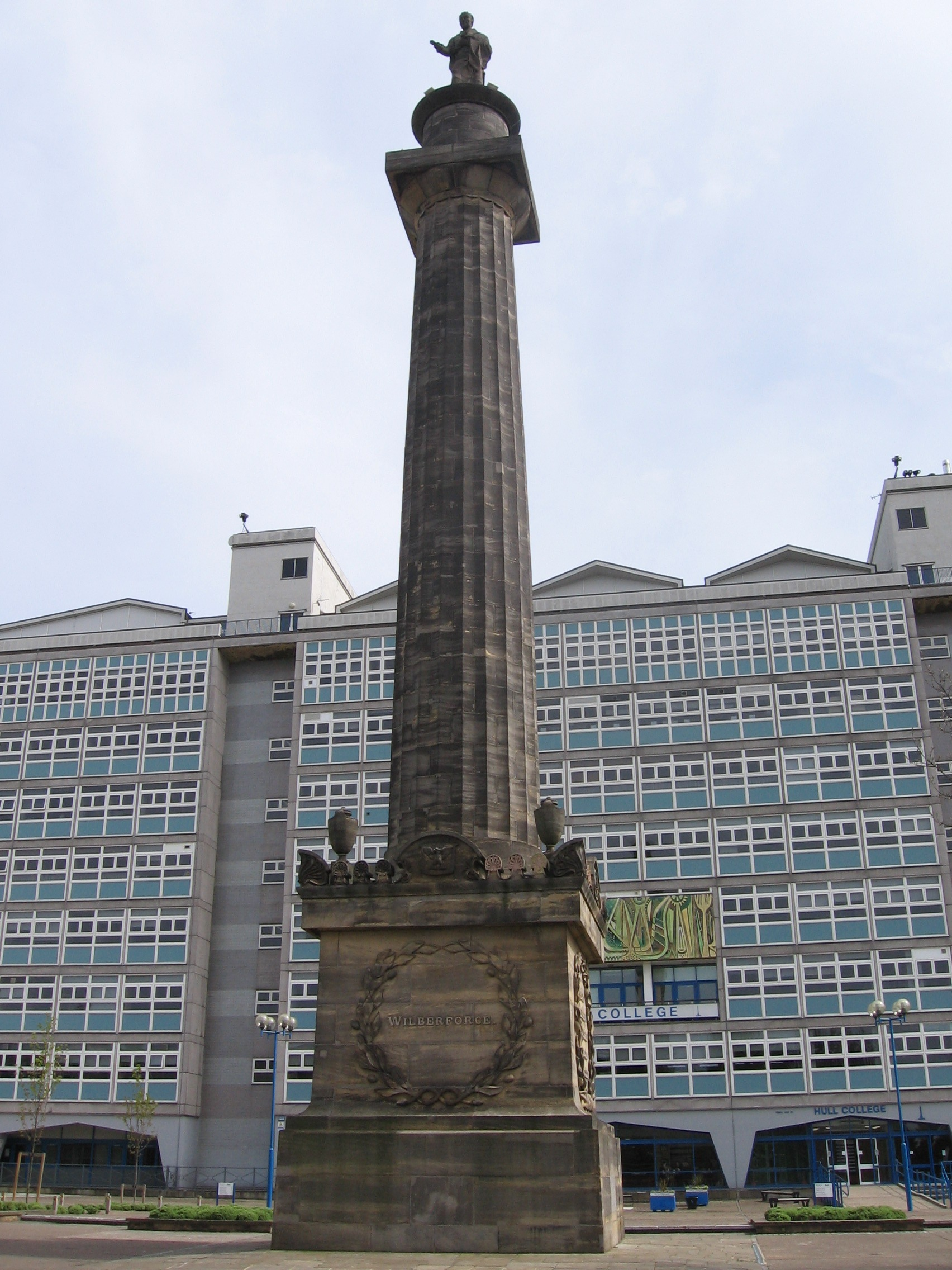
- The monument in 2008
- Interactive map of Wilberforce Monument
- Location: Queen's Gardens, Kingston upon Hull, England
- Coordinates: 53°44′45.5″N 0°19′58.5″W

Listed Building – Grade II
- Official name: Wilberforce Monument
- Designated: 13 October 1952
- Reference no.: 1283041
- Designer: W. H. Clark (column); Feort (statue)
- Builder: Myers and Wilson
- Material: Ashlar; Gritstone
- Height: 102 feet (31 m)
- Beginning date: 1 August 1834
- Completion date: 12 November 1835
- Dedicated to: William Wilberforce

The Wilberforce Monument is a monument honouring English politician and abolitionist William Wilberforce in Kingston Upon Hull, England. The ashlar structure consists of a Doric column topped by a statue of Wilberforce. Construction on the monument began in 1834 and was completed the following year. In 2011, it was designated a Grade II listed structure.

== History ==
=== Creation ===
William Wilberforce was born into a wealthy family in Kingston upon Hull in 1759. In 1780, he became a Member of Parliament (MP), a position he would hold until 1825. In 1787, following a conversion to evangelical Christianity, Wilberforce became a vocal abolitionist and championed anti-slavery causes in the House of Commons. He died in 1833, several days after the passage of the Slavery Abolition Act 1833, and was buried in Westminster Abbey.

Within five days of his death, the mayor of Kingston upon Hull was petitioned to erect a monument in his honour. The monument would be paid for through donations, and as a result, fundraising efforts quickly commenced. The total cost for the monument would be approximately £1,250. W. H. Clarks of Leeds was selected to design the monument as a Doric column. While Clarks was also responsible for overseeing the erection of the monument, the actual building was carried out by Myers and Wilson. On 1 August 1834, the date on which the Slavery Abolition Act went into effect, the monument's cornerstone was laid by Richard Bethell MP. While several locations in the city had been considered (including Kingston Square and several locations near the banks of the Humber), the location that had ultimately been selected was Whitefriargate, near the Princes Quay dock. A statue, initially only an afterthought of the monument committee, was also commissioned and created by Feort, a local sculptor. Construction was completed with the placement of the statue on 12 November 1835.

=== Relocation and later history ===
In the 1930s, the dock near the monument closed and new traffic plans for the area were drafted. The monument was viewed as a traffic hazard for the area between Whitefriargate and Queen Victoria Square, and arrangements were made to relocate the monument. A new location was selected for the eastern end of Queen's Gardens. In early 1935, Hull City Council voted to approve an offer from Councillor Robert Greenwood Tarran to move the monument using his construction company, Tarran Industries Ltd, with the total cost of the move estimated at £1,500. Work started in April and lasted for four months. At the new location, a time capsule was prepared that included articles from the Hull Times and Hull Daily Mail, a detailed explanation of how and why the monument was moved (including photographs and maps of the two locations), several coins (including a Jubilee Crown), a Wilberforce House Medal and papers relating to the history of Tarran Industries. During the move, tourists could pay to climb the scaffolding at both locations as an observation deck, with the money raised going to a local charity. The original location of the monument is now part of the Princes Quay shopping centre. On 19 September 1935, the gardens were opened by Herbert Morrison and the monument was rededicated by the wife of Arnold Reckitt, Wilberforce's great-granddaughter.

On 13 October 1952, the monument was designated as a Grade II listed structure, with Historic England noting that the monument represents "an early use of the commemorative column in England".

In 2020, during the George Floyd protests in the United Kingdom, Professor Trevor Burnard, director of the Wilberforce Institute for the Study of Slavery and Emancipation at the University of Hull, defended the monument and stated that while other monuments were under review due to their subjects' connections to the Atlantic slave trade, Wilberforce stood in direct opposition to slavery and, according to Burnard, he "knew that Black Lives Mattered".

== Design ==
The monument is made of ashlar blocks that form a fluted Doric column. This column stands atop a cubic plinth that is moulded with a plain cornice. At each corner of the top of this pedestal is acroteria and an urn. Each face of the plinth bears an inscription surrounded by a wreath, with those inscriptions reading "Erected by Voluntary Subscription", "First Stone Laid, 1 August 1834", "Negro Slavery Abolished, 1 Aug. MDCCCXXXIV", and "Wilberforce". At the top of the column is a square capital carrying a corniced tholobate atop which a statue of William Wilberforce, carved out of gritstone, stands. The total height of the monument is approximately 110 feet (34 m). (Note: This is the height given by Historic England. However, the Hull Museums Collections gives a height of the column as 90 feet (27 m) and the statue as 12 feet (3.7 m) for a total height of 102 feet (31 m). This total height is also stated in an article published by BBC Online and in an article published in the Hull Daily Mail.) Historian Marcus Wood notes that the monument as a whole "mimics" Nelson's Column.

== See also ==
- Listed buildings in Kingston upon Hull (Myton Ward)
