= 2004–05 Hull City A.F.C. season =

English football club season

Hull City
2004–05 season
- Manager: Peter Taylor
- Stadium: KC Stadium
- Football League One: 2nd
- FA Cup: Third Round
- League Cup: First Round
- League Trophy: First Round
- Top goalscorer: League: Stuart Elliott (27); All: Stuart Elliott (29)
Home colours	Away colours

The 2004–05 season saw Hull City compete in Football League One where they finished in 2nd position with 86 points, gaining automatic promotion to the Championship.

== Final league table ==
Pos	Team	Pld	W	D	L	GF	GA	GD	Pts	Promotion or relegation
1	Luton Town (C, P)	46	29	11	6	87	48	+39	98	Promotion to Football League Championship
2	Hull City (P)	46	26	8	12	80	53	+27	86	Promotion to Football League Championship
3	Tranmere Rovers	46	22	13	11	73	55	+18	79	Qualification for League One play-offs
4	Brentford	46	22	9	15	57	60	−3	75	Qualification for League One play-offs
5	Sheffield Wednesday (O, P)	46	19	15	12	77	59	+18	72	Qualification for League One play-offs

Updated to match(es) played on May 2005. Source: Soccerbase
Rules for classification: 1) points; 2) goal difference; 3) number of goals scored.
(C) Champions; (O) Play-off winners; (P) Promoted

== Results ==
Hull City's score comes first

=== Legend ===
Win	Draw	Loss

=== Football League One ===
Match	Date	Opponent	Venue	Result	Attendance	Scorers
1	7 August 2004	Bournemouth	H	1–0	17,569	Green
2	10 August 2004	Torquay United	A	3–0	3,973	Green, Elliott (2)
3	14 August 2004	Port Vale	A	2–3	6,736	Elliott, Barmby
4	21 August 2004	Oldham Athletic	H	2–0	16,916	Green, Allsopp
5	28 August 2004	Barnsley	A	2–1	13,175	Green, Elliott
6	31 August 2004	Bradford City	H	0–1	16,865	
7	5 September 2004	Huddersfield Town	A	0–4	18,421	
8	11 September 2004	Blackpool	H	2–1	15,568	Green, Elliott
9	18 September 2004	Peterborough United	A	3–2	5,745	Cort, Elliott (2)
10	25 September 2004	Stockport County	H	0–0	16,182	
11	2 October 2004	Hartlepool United	A	0–2	5,768	
12	10 October 2004	Chesterfield	A	0–2	15,500	Green
13	16 October 2004	Bristol City	A	1–3	12,011	Facey
14	20 October 2004	Milton Keynes Dons	H	3–2	14,317	Green (2), Keane
15	23 October 2004	Luton Town	H	3–0	18,575	Elliott (2), Facey
16	30 October 2004	Wrexham	A	2–2	5,601	Cort, Facey
17	6 November 2004	Walsall	H	3–1	16,010	Barmby, Elliott, Lewis
18	20 November 2004	Swindon Town	A	2–4	16,010	Walters, Elliott
19	27 November 2004	Brentford	H	2–0	15,710	Elliott (2)
20	8 December 2004	Sheffield Wednesday	A	4–2	28,701	Barmby (2), Keane, Allsopp
21	11 December 2004	Colchester United	A	2–1	4,046	Elliott, France
22	18 December 2004	Tranmere Rovers	H	6–1	20,064	Elliott (3), Ashbee, Barmby, Allsopp
23	26 December 2004	Blackpool	A	2–0	8,774	Elliott (2)
24	28 December 2004	Doncaster Rovers	H	2–1	24,117	Elliott, Allsopp
25	1 January 2005	Huddersfield Town	H	2–1	22,291	Wilbraham, Elliott
26	3 January 2005	Stockport County	A	3–1	6,670	Allsopp, Price, Wilbraham
27	15 January 2005	Peterborough United	H	2–2	16,149	Barmby, Green
28	22 January 2005	Doncaster Rovers	A	0–1	9,633	
29	1 February 2005	Chesterfield	A	1–1	5,517	Lewis
30	5 February 2005	Bristol City	H	1–1	17,637	Barmby
31	12 February 2005	Luton Town	A	0–1	9,500	
32	19 February 2005	Wrexham	H	2–1	15,995	Allsopp (2)
33	22 February 2005	Milton Keynes Dons	A	1–1	4,407	Facey
34	26 February 2005	Colchester United	H	2–0	16,484	Barmby, Cort
35	5 March 2005	Tranmere Rovers	A	3–1	12,684	Ellison, Price, Fagan
36	8 March 2005	Hartlepool United	H	1–0	17,112	Elliott
37	12 March 2005	Torquay United	H	2–0	17,147	Elliott, Fagan
38	19 March 2005	Bournemouth	A	4–0	8,895	Elliott (2), Delaney, France
39	26 March 2005	Port Vale	H	2–2	17,678	Cort, Fagan
40	28 March 2005	Oldham Athletic	A	0–1	8,562	
41	2 April 2005	Barnsley	H	2–1	19,341	Cort, Fagan
42	10 April 2005	Bradford City	A	2–0	13,631	Elliott, Barmby
43	16 April 2005	Swindon Town	H	0–0	23,125	
44	23 April 2005	Walsall	A	0–3	7,958	
45	30 April 2005	Sheffield Wednesday	H	1–2	24,277	Elliott
46	7 May 2005	Brentford	A	1–2	9,604	Cort

=== FA Cup ===
Match	Date	Opponent	Venue	Result	Attendance	Scorers
R1	13 November 2004	Morecambe	H	3–2	10,129	Green, Keane, Walters
R2	4 December 2004	Macclesfield Town	H	4–0	9,831	Elliott, France, Facey (2)
R3	8 January 2005	Colchester United	H	0–2	14,027	

=== Football League Cup ===
Match	Date	Opponent	Venue	Result	Attendance	Scorers
R1	24 August 2004	Wrexham	H	2 – 2 (1 – 3 pens)	6,079	Keane, France

=== Football League Trophy ===
Match	Date	Opponent	Venue	Result	Attendance	Scorers
R1	28 September 2004	Hartlepool United	A	3 – 3 (1 – 4 pens)	1,535	Price, Green, Elliott

== Squad statistics ==
No.	Pos.	Name	League		FA Cup		League Cup		Other		Total	
No.	Pos.	Name	Apps	Goals	Apps	Goals	Apps	Goals	Apps	Goals	Apps	Goals
1	GK	(Wales) Boaz Myhill	45	0	3	0	0	0	1	0	49	0
2	DF	(England) Alton Thelwell	2(1)	0	0	0	0	0	0	0	2(1)	0
3	DF	(England) Andy Dawson	34	0	3	0	0(1)	0	0	0	37(1)	0
4	DF	(England) Ian Ashbee	40	1	2	0	1	0	1	0	44	1
5	DF	(England) Leon Cort	43(1)	6	3	0	1	0	0	0	47(1)	6
6	DF	(Antigua and Barbuda) Marc Joseph	25(4)	0	2	0	1	0	0	0	28(4)	0
7	MF	(Northern Ireland) Stuart Elliott	35(1)	27	2	1	0(1)	0	0(1)	1	37(3)	29
8	MF	(England) Nick Barmby	38(1)	9	2	0	0	0	0	0	40(1)	9
9	FW	(Republic of Ireland) Ben Burgess	0(2)	0	0	0	0	0	0	0	0(2)	0
10	FW	(Australia) Danny Allsopp	14(14)	7	1(1)	0	0	0	0	0	15(14)	7
11	FW	(Republic of Ireland) Jonathan Walters	4(17)	1	0(2)	1	1	0	1	0	6(19)	2
12	GK	(England) Matt Duke	1(1)	0	0	0	1	0	0(1)	0	2(2)	0
14	MF	(England) Stuart Green	26(3)	8	2	1	0(1)	0	0(1)	1	28(5)	10
15	DF	(England) Roland Edge	13(1)	0	0	0	1	0	1	0	15(1)	0
16	DF	(Republic of Ireland) Damien Delaney	43	1	3	0	1	0	0	0	47	1
17	FW	(Grenada) Delroy Facey	12(9)	4	2	2	1	0	1	0	16(9)	6
18	FW	(Wales) Jason Price	6(21)	2	1(1)	1	0	0	1	1	8(21)	4
19	MF	(England) Junior Lewis	31(8)	2	1(1)	0	0	0	1	0	33(9)	2
20	MF	(Republic of Ireland) Michael Keane	12(8)	3	3	1	1	1	1	0	16(8)	5
21	DF	(England) Nathan Peat	0	0	0	0	0	0	0	0	0	0
22	FW	(England) Aaron Wilbraham	10(9)	2	1	0	0	0	0	0	11(9)	2
23	DF	(England) Stevland Angus	1(1)	0	1	0	0	0	0	0	2(1)	0
24	FW	(England) Kevin Ellison	11(5)	1	0	0	0	0	0	0	11(5)	1
25	MF	(England) Andy Hessenthaler	6(4)	0	0	0	0	0	0	0	6(4)	1
26	DF	(England) Robbie Stockdale	12(2)	0	0	0	0	0	0	0	12(2)	0
27	FW	(England) Craig Fagan	11(1)	4	0	0	0	0	0	0	11(1)	4
28	DF	(England) Richard Hinds	6	0	0	0	0	0	1	0	7	0
29	MF	(England) Ryan France	22(9)	2	1(1)	1	1	1	0	0	24(10)	4
30	DF	(England) Scott Wiseman	2(1)	0	0(1)	0	0	0	0(1)	0	2(3)	0
33	FW	(England) Clayton Donaldson	0	0	0	0	0	0	0	0	0	0
34	MF	(England) Russell Fry	1	0	0(1)	0	0	0	0	0	1(1)	0
