= 2003–04 Hull City A.F.C. season =

English football club season

Hull City
2003–04 season
- Manager: Peter Taylor
- Stadium: KC Stadium
- Football League Third Division: 2nd
- FA Cup: First round
- League Cup: First round
- League Trophy: Second round
Home colours	Away colours	Third colours

The 2003–04 season saw Hull City compete in the Football League Third Division where they finished in 2nd position with 88 points, gaining automatic promotion to League One.

== Final league table ==
Pos	Team	Pld	W	D	L	GF	GA	GD	Pts	Promotion or relegation
1	Doncaster Rovers (C, P)	46	27	11	8	79	37	+42	92	Promotion to Football League One
2	Hull City (P)	46	25	13	8	82	44	+38	88	Promotion to Football League One
3	Torquay United (P)	46	23	12	11	68	44	+24	81	Promotion to Football League One
4	Huddersfield Town (O, P)	46	23	12	11	68	52	+16	81	Qualification for the Third Division play-offs
5	Mansfield Town	46	22	9	15	76	62	+14	75	Qualification for the Third Division play-offs

Rules for classification: In the Football League goals scored (GF) takes precedence over goal difference (GD).
(C) Champions; (O) Play-off winners; (P) Promoted

== Results ==
Hull City's score comes first

=== Legend ===
Win	Draw	Loss

=== Football League Third Division ===
Match	Date	Opponent	Venue	Result	Attendance	Scorers
1	9 August 2003	Darlington	H	4 – 1	14,675	Burgess, Price, Thelwell, Allsopp
2	16 August 2003	Oxford United	A	1 – 2	6,618	Allsopp
3	23 August 2003	Cheltenham Town	H	3 – 3	12,522	Elliott, Price, Allsopp
4	25 August 2003	Cambridge United	A	2 – 0	4,571	Price, Allsopp
5	30 August 2003	Boston United	H	2 – 1	13,091	Elliott, Green
6	8 September 2003	Doncaster Rovers	A	0 – 0	7,132	
7	13 September 2003	Southend United	H	3 – 2	12,545	Allsopp, Dawson, Elliott
8	16 September 2003	Leyton Orient	A	1 – 1	3,728	Burgess
9	20 September 2003	Rochdale	A	2 – 0	4,215	Burgess, Green
10	27 September 2003	Kidderminster Harriers	H	6 – 1	13,683	Burgess (2), Green, Allsopp, France, Dawson
11	30 September 2003	Swansea City	H	1 – 0	20,903	Elliott
12	4 October 2003	Northampton Town	A	5 – 1	6,011	Elliott, Allsopp, Price, Burgess, Forrester
13	12 October 2003	Carlisle United	H	2 – 1	19,050	Burgess, Forrester
14	18 October 2003	Torquay United	A	1 – 1	3,720	Elliott
15	21 October 2003	Bury	A	0 – 0	3,896	
16	25 October 2003	Lincoln City	H	3 – 0	17,453	Holt, Allsopp, Green
17	1 November 2003	Macclesfield Town	H	2 – 2	15,053	Allsopp, Hinds
18	15 November 2003	Huddersfield Town	A	1 – 3	13,893	Forrester
19	22 November 2003	Yeovil Town	H	0 – 0	14,367	
20	29 November 2003	Bristol Rovers	A	1 – 2	6,331	Burgess
21	6 December 2003	Bury	H	2 – 0	11,308	Burgess, Price
22	13 December 2003	Scunthorpe United	A	1 – 1	6,426	Elliott
23	20 December 2003	Mansfield Town	A	0 – 1	15,005	
24	26 December 2003	York City	A	2 – 0	7,923	Burgess, Forrester
25	28 December 2003	Doncaster Rovers	H	3 – 1	23,006	Price (3)
26	3 January 2004	Cambridge United	H	2 – 0	14,271	Elliott (2)
27	10 January 2004	Darlington	A	1 – 0	6,847	Elliott
28	17 January 2004	Oxford United	H	4 – 2	21,491	Burgess, Allsopp (2), Crosby (o.g.)
29	24 January 2004	Cheltenham Town	A	2 – 0	4,536	Burgess, Allsopp
30	7 February 2004	York City	H	2 – 1	19,099	Walters, Allsopp
31	14 February 2004	Carlisle United	A	1 – 1	7,176	Green
32	21 February 2004	Torquay United	H	0 – 1	15,222	
33	28 February 2004	Lincoln City	A	0 – 2	7,069	
34	6 March 2004	Mansfield Town	A	0 – 1	6,859	
35	13 March 2004	Scunthorpe United	H	2 – 1	19,079	Burgess (2)
36	16 March 2004	Leyton Orient	H	3 – 0	15,531	Burgess, Elliott, France
37	27 March 2004	Rochdale	H	1 – 0	16,050	Delaney
38	31 March 2004	Boston United	A	2 – 1	4,741	Elliott, Allsopp
39	3 April 2004	Kidderminster Harriers	A	1 – 1	3,853	Burgess
40	10 April 2004	Northampton Town	H	2 – 3	18,071	Elliott, Dawson
41	12 April 2004	Swansea City	A	3 – 2	5,993	Burgess (2), Allsopp
42	17 April 2004	Macclesfield Town	A	1 – 1	3,801	Joseph
43	20 April 2004	Southend United	A	2 – 2	5,389	Lewis, Ashbee
44	24 April 2004	Huddersfield Town	H	0 – 0	23,495	
45	1 May 2004	Yeovil Town	A	2 – 1	8,760	Green, Ashbee
46	8 May 2004	Bristol Rovers	H	3 – 0	22,562	Price, Elliott, Delaney

=== FA Cup ===
Match	Date	Opponent	Venue	Result	Attendance	Scorers
R1	8 November 2003	Cheltenham Town	A	1 – 3	3,624	Price

=== Football League Cup ===
Match	Date	Opponent	Venue	Result	Attendance	Scorers
R1	12 August 2003	Wigan Athletic	A	0 – 2	3,925	

=== Football League Trophy ===
Match	Date	Opponent	Venue	Result	Attendance	Scorers
R1	14 October 2003	Darlington	A	3 – 1	1,578	France, Forrester, Williams
R2	4 November 2003	Scunthorpe United	H	1 – 3	6,656	Webb

== Squad statistics ==
No.	Pos.	Name	League		FA Cup		League Cup		Other		Total	
No.	Pos.	Name	Apps	Goals	Apps	Goals	Apps	Goals	Apps	Goals	Apps	Goals
1	GK	(Northern Ireland) Alan Fettis	3	0	0	0	1	0	2	0	6	0
2	DF	(England) Alton Thelwell	22(4)	1	0	0	1	0	0	0	23(4)	1
3	DF	(England) Andy Dawson	32(1)	3	1	0	0	0	0	0	33(1)	3
4	DF	(England) Ian Ashbee	39	2	1	0	1	0	0	0	41	2
5	DF	(Scotland) John Anderson	0	0	0	0	0	0	0	0	0	0
6	DF	(Antigua and Barbuda) Marc Joseph	32	1	1	0	0	0	1	0	34	1
7	MF	(Northern Ireland) Stuart Elliott	42	14	0(1)	0	1	0	0	0	43(1)	14
8	FW	(England) Jamie Forrester	6(15)	4	0(1)	0	0	0	1	1	7(16)	5
9	FW	(Republic of Ireland) Ben Burgess	44	18	1	0	1	0	0	0	46	18
10	FW	(Australia) Danny Allsopp	31(5)	15	0	0	1	0	0	0	32(5)	15
11	FW	(Republic of Ireland) Jonathan Walters	5(11)	1	0	0	0	0	0	0	5(11)	1
12	GK	(England) Paul Musselwhite	17(1)	0	1	0	0	0	0	0	18(1)	0
13	GK	(Wales) Boaz Myhill	23	0	0	0	0	0	0	0	23	0
14	MF	(England) Stuart Green	38(4)	6	1	0	1	0	0	0	40(4)	6
15	DF	(England) Justin Whittle	15(3)	0	1	0	1	0	1	0	18(3)	0
16	DF	(Republic of Ireland) Damien Delaney	46	2	1	0	1	0	0	0	48	2
17	MF	(England) Steve Melton	0(5)	0	0	0	0(1)	0	2	0	2(6)	0
18	FW	(Wales) Jason Price	29(4)	9	1	1	1	0	1	0	32(4)	10
19	MF	(England) Dean Keates	9(5)	0	0	0	0(1)	0	2	0	11(6)	0
19	MF	(England) Junior Lewis	13	1	0	0	0	0	2	0	13	1
20	MF	(England) Ryan Williams	0	0	0	0	0	0	1	1	1	1
20	MF	(England) Lee Marshall	10(1)	0	0	0	0	0	0	0	10(1)	0
21	DF	(England) Nathan Peat	0(1)	0	0	0	0	0	1(1)	0	1(2)	0
22	DF	(England) Carl Regan	0	0	0	0	0	0	1	0	1	0
23	DF	(England) Shaun Smith	0	0	0	0	0	0	1	0	1	0
24	DF	(England) Andy Holt	6(19)	1	1	0	0	0	1	0	8(19)	1
25	DF	(England) Daniel Webb	0(4)	0	0	0	0	0	2	1	2(4)	1
26	DF	(England) Steve Burton	0	0	0	0	0	0	1	0	1	0
27	DF	(England) Greg Strong	0	0	0	0	0	0	2	0	2	0
28	DF	(England) Richard Hinds	34(5)	1	1	0	1	0	0	0	36(5)	1
29	MF	(England) Ryan France	7(21)	2	0	0	0	0	2	1	9(21)	2
30	GK	(Netherlands) Michel Kuipers	3	0	0	0	0	0	0	0	3	0
31	DF	(England) Scott Wiseman	0(2)	0	0	0	0	0	0	0	0(2)	0
33	FW	(England) Clayton Donaldson	0	0	0	0	0	0	0(2)	0	0(2)	0
34	MF	(England) Russell Fry	0	0	0	0	0	0	0(1)	0	0(1)	0
