= 2006–07 Hull City A.F.C. season =

English football club season

Hull City
2006–07 season
- Chairman: Adam Pearson
- Manager: Phil Parkinson (until 4 December); Phil Brown (from 4 December)
- Stadium: KC Stadium
- Championship: 21st
- FA Cup: Third round
- League Cup: Third round
- Top goalscorer: Windass (8)
- Average home league attendance: 18,845
| Home colours | Away colours |

During the 2006–07 English football season, Hull City competed in the Football League Championship.

== Season summary ==
On 13 June 2006, Peter Taylor left Hull to take up the job vacated by Dowie at Crystal Palace, a club at which he had enjoyed considerable success as a player. Phil Parkinson was confirmed as his replacement on 29 June 2006, with Hull paying Colchester (with whom Parkinson was still under contract) £400,000 compensation. Phil Brown, who had recently departed his job as manager of Derby County, joined the club as Parkinson's assistant.

Defender Leon Cort became Hull's first million-pound player when he followed Peter Taylor to Crystal Palace for a fee of £1,250,000. Parkinson wasted no time in spending the majority of this money on strengthening the City squad in readiness for the 2006–07 season.

Chairman Adam Pearson stated his ambition to take Hull into the top flight for the first time in their history – and he believed Phil Parkinson was the manager to do it. However, their dismal start to the 2006–07 season was hardly the form of a team attempting to gain promotion, and on 4 December 2006 Parkinson was sacked as manager with Hull in the relegation zone, despite having spent over £2 million on players.

Phil Brown was appointed as caretaker manager and by 4 January 2007, Hull had moved out of the relegation zone and Brown was rewarded with a contract as their new manager until at least the end of the season.

Hull's Championship game against Sunderland on 17 March 2007 at the Stadium of Light saw an attendance of 38,448, a record to a Hull City game since they visited Stamford Bridge on 14 May 1977.

Hull City all but secured their place in the Championship next season with a 1–0 victory away at Cardiff City, on 28 April 2007. This left them 3 points clear of Leeds United, the only side with a chance of overtaking them, but with a vastly superior goal difference this was only a mathematical possibility. This crucial goal was scored by Dean Windass, who had rejoined his hometown club on loan from Bradford City. By 4 May, due to a lack of any realistic chance of them remaining in the Championship, Leeds went into administration and in doing so received the 10 point penalty such a move incurs. This deduction left Leeds at the bottom of the championship on 36 points, securing Hull's place in the Championship for the 2007–08 season.

== Final league table ==
| Pos | Team | Pld | W | D | L | GF | GA | GD | Pts | Promotion, qualification or relegation |
|---|---|---|---|---|---|---|---|---|---|---|
| 19 | Leicester City | 46 | 13 | 14 | 19 | 49 | 64 | −15 | 53 | |
| 20 | Barnsley | 46 | 15 | 5 | 26 | 53 | 85 | −32 | 50 | |
| 21 | Hull City | 46 | 13 | 10 | 23 | 51 | 67 | −16 | 49 | |
| 22 | Southend United (R) | 46 | 10 | 12 | 24 | 47 | 80 | −33 | 42 | Relegation to Football League One |
| 23 | Luton Town (R) | 46 | 10 | 10 | 26 | 53 | 81 | −28 | 40 | Relegation to Football League One |

Source: RSSSF
Rules for classification: In the Football League goals scored (F) takes precedence over goal difference (GD).
(R) Relegated

== Results ==
Hull City's score comes first

=== Legend ===
| Win | Draw | Loss |

=== Football League Championship ===
| Date | Opponent | Venue | Result | Attendance | Scorers |
|---|---|---|---|---|---|
| 5 August 2006 | West Bromwich Albion | A | 0–2 | 20,682 | |
| 8 August 2006 | Barnsley | H | 2–3 | 18,207 | Parkin (2) |
| 12 August 2006 | Derby County | H | 1–2 | 15,261 | Parkin (pen) |
| 19 August 2006 | Ipswich Town | A | 0–0 | 19,790 | |
| 26 August 2006 | Coventry City | H | 0–1 | 16,145 | |
| 9 September 2006 | Birmingham City | A | 1–2 | 19,228 | Livermore |
| 12 September 2006 | Leicester City | A | 1–0 | 18,677 | Bridges |
| 15 September 2006 | Sheffield Wednesday | H | 2–1 | 17,685 | Parkin (2) |
| 23 September 2006 | Queens Park Rangers | A | 0–2 | 11,381 | |
| 30 September 2006 | Crystal Palace | H | 1–1 | 18,099 | Turner |
| 14 October 2006 | Burnley | A | 0–2 | 11,530 | |
| 17 October 2006 | Luton Town | H | 0–0 | 14,895 | |
| 21 October 2006 | Preston North End | A | 1–2 | 13,728 | Welsh |
| 28 October 2006 | Sunderland | H | 0–1 | 25,512 | |
| 31 October 2006 | Southend United | A | 3–2 | 10,234 | Parkin, Elliott, Fagan |
| 4 November 2006 | Southampton | A | 0–0 | 20,560 | |
| 11 November 2006 | Wolverhampton Wanderers | H | 2–0 | 16,962 | Fagan, Elliott |
| 18 November 2006 | Stoke City | H | 0–2 | 16,940 | |
| 25 November 2006 | Norwich City | A | 1–1 | 24,129 | Turner |
| 28 November 2006 | Colchester United | A | 1–5 | 5,373 | Forster |
| 2 December 2006 | Southampton | H | 2–4 | 15,697 | Barmby, Fagan |
| 9 December 2006 | Plymouth Argyle | A | 0–1 | 12,101 | |
| 16 December 2006 | Cardiff City | H | 4–1 | 23,089 | Delaney, Marney, Fagan, Bridges |
| 23 December 2006 | Leeds United | A | 0–0 | 22,578 | |
| 26 December 2006 | Leicester City | H | 1–2 | 18,523 | Fagan |
| 30 December 2006 | Burnley | H | 2–0 | 17,731 | Marney, Fagan (pen) |
| 1 January 2007 | Sheffield Wednesday | A | 2–1 | 28,600 | Barmby (2) |
| 13 January 2007 | Queens Park Rangers | H | 2–1 | 19,791 | Elliott (2) |
| 20 January 2007 | Crystal Palace | A | 1–1 | 17,012 | Ashbee |
| 30 January 2007 | Leeds United | H | 1–2 | 24,311 | Forster |
| 3 February 2007 | West Bromwich Albion | H | 0–1 | 18,005 | |
| 10 February 2007 | Derby County | A | 2–2 | 28,140 | Dawson, Livermore |
| 20 February 2007 | Barnsley | A | 0–3 | 12,526 | |
| 24 February 2007 | Birmingham City | H | 2–0 | 18,811 | Windass (2, 1 pen) |
| 3 March 2007 | Coventry City | A | 0–2 | 21,079 | |
| 6 March 2007 | Ipswich Town | H | 2–5 | 18,056 | Windass (2, 1 pen) |
| 10 March 2007 | Preston North End | H | 2–0 | 17,118 | Forster, Livermore |
| 13 March 2007 | Luton Town | A | 2–1 | 7,777 | Livermore, Turner |
| 17 March 2007 | Sunderland | A | 0–2 | 38,448 | |
| 31 March 2007 | Southend United | H | 4–0 | 19,629 | Windass (3), Ricketts |
| 6 April 2007 | Norwich City | H | 1–2 | 19,053 | Dawson |
| 9 April 2007 | Wolverhampton Wanderers | A | 1–3 | 20,772 | Forster |
| 14 April 2007 | Colchester United | H | 1–1 | 20,887 | Forster |
| 21 April 2007 | Stoke City | A | 1–1 | 17,109 | Barmby |
| 28 April 2007 | Cardiff City | A | 1–0 | 12,421 | Windass |
| 6 May 2007 | Plymouth Argyle | H | 1–2 | 20,661 | Elliott |

=== FA Cup ===
| Round | Date | Opponent | Venue | Result | Attendance | Goalscorers |
|---|---|---|---|---|---|---|
| R3 | 6 January 2007 | Middlesbrough | H | 1–1 | 17,520 | Forster |
| R3R | 16 January 2007 | Middlesbrough | A | 3–4 | 16,702 | Dawson (2), Parkin (pen) |

=== League Cup ===
| Round | Date | Opponent | Venue | Result | Attendance | Goalscorers |
|---|---|---|---|---|---|---|
| R1 | 22 August 2006 | Tranmere Rovers | H | 2–1 (a.e.t.) | 6,075 | Burgess, Duffy |
| R2 | 19 September 2006 | Hartlepool United | H | 0–0 | 6,392 | |
| R3 | 24 October 2006 | Watford | A | 1–2 | 8,274 | Barmby |

== Squad ==
Note: Flags indicate national team as defined under FIFA eligibility rules; some limited exceptions apply. Players may hold more than one non-FIFA nationality.

| No. | Pos. | Nation | Player |
|---|---|---|---|
| 1 | GK | WAL | Boaz Myhill |
| 2 | MF | ENG | Nathan Doyle |
| 3 | DF | ENG | Andy Dawson |
| 4 | MF | ENG | Ian Ashbee |
| 5 | DF | ENG | Danny Coles |
| 6 | DF | ENG | Michael Turner |
| 7 | MF | NIR | Stuart Elliott |
| 8 | MF | ENG | Nick Barmby |
| 9 | FW | ENG | Nicky Forster |
| 10 | FW | SCO | Stephen McPhee |
| 11 | FW | ENG | Jon Parkin |
| 12 | GK | ENG | Matt Duke |
| 14 | MF | ENG | Ray Parlour |
| 15 | FW | SCO | Darryl Duffy |
| 16 | MF | IRL | Damien Delaney |
| 17 | FW | ENG | Michael Bridges |

| No. | Pos. | Nation | Player |
|---|---|---|---|
| 19 | MF | ENG | John Welsh |
| 20 | FW | ENG | Dean Windass (on loan from Bradford City) |
| 21 | DF | WAL | Sam Ricketts |
| 22 | MF | ENG | Dean Marney |
| 23 | DF | ENG | Sam Collins |
| 24 | MF | ENG | David Livermore |
| 27 | MF | ENG | Lee Peltier (on loan from Liverpool) |
| 28 | MF | ENG | Russell Fry |
| 29 | MF | ENG | Ryan France |
| 30 | DF | ENG | Scott Wiseman |
| 33 | DF | ENG | Matty Plummer |
| 34 | FW | ENG | Nicky Featherstone |
| 35 | DF | ENG | Michael Byron |
| 36 | GK | ENG | Curtis Aspden |
| 37 | MF | ENG | Ben Wilkinson |
| 38 | DF | ENG | Tom Matthews |

=== Left club during season ===
Note: Flags indicate national team as defined under FIFA eligibility rules; some limited exceptions apply. Players may hold more than one non-FIFA nationality.

| No. | Pos. | Nation | Player |
|---|---|---|---|
| 17 | MF | IRL | Keith Andrews (to Milton Keynes Dons) |
| 9 | FW | IRL | Ben Burgess (to Blackpool) |
| 2 | DF | ENG | Mark Lynch (to Yeovil Town) |
| 14 | MF | ENG | Stuart Green (to Crystal Palace) |
| 25 | DF | ENG | Danny Mills (on loan from Manchester City) |

| No. | Pos. | Nation | Player |
|---|---|---|---|
| 14 | MF | ENG | Jason Jarrett (on loan from Preston North End) |
| 20 | DF | ENG | Alton Thelwell (to Leyton Orient) |
| 18 | MF | IRL | Mark Yeates (on loan from Tottenham Hotspur) |
| 27 | FW | ENG | Craig Fagan (to Derby County) |
| 26 | FW | POR | Ricardo Vaz Tê (on loan from Bolton Wanderers) |
