= 2005–06 Hull City A.F.C. season =

English football club season

Hull City
2005–06 season
- Chairman: Adam Pearson
- Manager: Peter Taylor
- Stadium: KC Stadium
- Championship: 18th
- FA Cup: Third round
- League Cup: First round
- Player of the Year: Boaz Myhill
- Top goalscorer: Elliott (7)
- Highest home attendance: 23,486 vs Leeds United (1 Apr 2006, Championship)
- Lowest home attendance: 17,051 vs Aston Villa (7 Jan 2006, FA Cup)
- Average home league attendance: 19,841
| Home colours | Away colours | Third colours |

During the 2005–06 English football season, Hull City A.F.C. competed in the Football League Championship.

== Season summary ==
The 2005–06 season was hardly the most exciting in Hull City's history and it was more a season of consolidation after two successive promotions. Hull finished the Championship season in 18th place – a comfortable 10 points clear of relegation and their highest league finish for 16 years.

The successful stint at Hull City saw Taylor linked with the Charlton Athletic manager's job before it was given to Iain Dowie. On 13 June 2006, Taylor left Hull to take up the job vacated by Dowie at Crystal Palace, a club at which he had enjoyed considerable success as a player.

== Final league table ==
| Pos | Team | Pld | W | D | L | GF | GA | GD | Pts |
|---|---|---|---|---|---|---|---|---|---|
| 16 | Leicester City | 46 | 13 | 15 | 18 | 51 | 59 | −8 | 54 |
| 17 | Burnley | 46 | 14 | 12 | 20 | 46 | 54 | −8 | 54 |
| 18 | Hull City | 46 | 12 | 16 | 18 | 49 | 55 | −6 | 52 |
| 19 | Sheffield Wednesday | 46 | 13 | 13 | 20 | 39 | 52 | −13 | 52 |
| 20 | Derby County | 46 | 10 | 20 | 16 | 53 | 67 | −14 | 50 |

Updated to match(es) played on 2 December 2011. Source: RSSSF
Rules for classification: 1) points; 2) goal difference; 3) number of goals scored.

== Results ==
Hull City's score comes first

=== Legend ===
| Win | Draw | Loss |

=== Football League Championship ===
| Date | Opponent | Venue | Result | Attendance | Scorers |
|---|---|---|---|---|---|
| 6 August 2005 | Queens Park Rangers | H | 0–0 | 22,201 | |
| 9 August 2005 | Sheffield Wednesday | A | 1–1 | 29,910 | Barmby |
| 13 August 2005 | Wolverhampton Wanderers | A | 0–1 | 24,333 | |
| 20 August 2005 | Brighton & Hove Albion | H | 2–0 | 18,648 | France, Burgess |
| 27 August 2005 | Plymouth Argyle | A | 1–0 | 12,329 | Elliott |
| 29 August 2005 | Leicester City | H | 1–1 | 20,192 | Fagan |
| 10 September 2005 | Crystal Palace | A | 0–2 | 18,630 | |
| 13 September 2005 | Stoke City | H | 0–1 | 18,692 | |
| 17 September 2005 | Luton Town | H | 0–1 | 19,184 | |
| 24 September 2005 | Coventry City | A | 2–0 | 21,161 | Welsh (2) |
| 27 September 2005 | Norwich City | A | 1–2 | 27,470 | Cort |
| 30 September 2005 | Millwall | H | 1–1 | 18,761 | Burgess |
| 15 October 2005 | Southampton | A | 1–1 | 23,810 | Ellison |
| 18 October 2005 | Reading | H | 1–1 | 17,698 | Brown |
| 22 October 2005 | Derby County | H | 2–1 | 20,661 | Elliott, Green (pen) |
| 28 October 2005 | Burnley | A | 0–1 | 11,701 | |
| 1 November 2005 | Preston North End | A | 0–3 | 13,536 | |
| 5 November 2005 | Watford | H | 1–2 | 18,444 | Barmby |
| 19 November 2005 | Reading | A | 1–3 | 17,864 | Barmby |
| 22 November 2005 | Southampton | H | 1–1 | 18,061 | Barmby |
| 26 November 2005 | Queens Park Rangers | A | 2–2 | 13,815 | France, Paynter |
| 3 December 2005 | Cardiff City | H | 2–0 | 18,364 | Paynter, Fagan |
| 10 December 2005 | Sheffield Wednesday | H | 1–0 | 21,329 | Price |
| 16 December 2005 | Brighton & Hove Albion | A | 1–2 | 6,929 | Elliott |
| 26 December 2005 | Crewe Alexandra | A | 2–2 | 7,942 | Fagan, Paynter |
| 28 December 2005 | Ipswich Town | H | 2–0 | 20,124 | Barmby, Fagan |
| 31 December 2005 | Leeds United | A | 0–2 | 26,387 | |
| 3 January 2006 | Sheffield United | H | 1–3 | 21,929 | Price |
| 14 January 2006 | Crystal Palace | H | 1–2 | 18,886 | Parkin |
| 21 January 2006 | Stoke City | A | 3–0 | 13,444 | Russell (own goal), Parkin, Duffy |
| 31 January 2006 | Coventry City | H | 1–2 | 18,381 | Elliott |
| 4 February 2006 | Luton Town | A | 3–2 | 8,835 | Elliott, Duffy, Parkin |
| 11 February 2006 | Norwich City | H | 1–1 | 20,527 | Cort |
| 14 February 2006 | Millwall | A | 1–1 | 7,108 | Parkin |
| 18 February 2006 | Cardiff City | A | 0–1 | 11,047 | |
| 25 February 2006 | Wolverhampton Wanderers | H | 2–3 | 19,841 | Cort, Edwards (own goal) |
| 4 March 2006 | Leicester City | A | 2–3 | 22,835 | Elliott, Green |
| 11 March 2006 | Plymouth Argyle | H | 1–0 | 20,137 | Fagan |
| 18 March 2006 | Crewe Alexandra | H | 1–0 | 21,163 | Green |
| 25 March 2006 | Ipswich Town | A | 1–1 | 23,968 | Cort |
| 1 April 2006 | Leeds United | H | 1–0 | 23,486 | Parkin |
| 8 April 2006 | Sheffield United | A | 2–3 | 26,324 | Elliott, Duffy |
| 15 April 2006 | Burnley | H | 0–0 | 19,926 | |
| 17 April 2006 | Derby County | A | 1–1 | 24,961 | Green |
| 22 April 2006 | Preston North End | H | 1–1 | 19,716 | Mawéné (own goal) |
| 30 April 2006 | Watford | A | 0–0 | 17,128 | |

=== FA Cup ===
| Round | Date | Opponent | Venue | Result | Attendance | Goalscorers |
|---|---|---|---|---|---|---|
| R3 | 7 January 2006 | Aston Villa | H | 0–1 | 17,051 | |

=== League Cup ===
| Round | Date | Opponent | Venue | Result | Attendance | Goalscorers |
|---|---|---|---|---|---|---|
| R1 | 23 August 2005 | Blackpool | A | 1–2 | 3,819 | Price |

== Squad ==
Note: Flags indicate national team as defined under FIFA eligibility rules; some limited exceptions apply. Players may hold more than one non-FIFA nationality.

| No. | Pos. | Nation | Player |
|---|---|---|---|
| 1 | GK | WAL | Boaz Myhill |
| 2 | DF | ENG | Mark Lynch |
| 3 | DF | ENG | Andy Dawson |
| 4 | MF | ENG | Ian Ashbee |
| 5 | DF | ENG | Leon Cort |
| 6 | FW | ENG | Jon Parkin |
| 7 | MF | NIR | Stuart Elliott |
| 8 | MF | ENG | Nick Barmby |
| 9 | FW | IRL | Ben Burgess |
| 10 | MF | SCO | Stephen McPhee |
| 12 | GK | ENG | Matt Duke |
| 14 | MF | ENG | Stuart Green |
| 15 | DF | ANG | Rui Marques |
| 16 | MF | IRL | Damien Delaney |
| 17 | MF | IRL | Keith Andrews |

| No. | Pos. | Nation | Player |
|---|---|---|---|
| 19 | DF | ENG | John Welsh |
| 20 | DF | ENG | Alton Thelwell |
| 21 | DF | ENG | Danny Coles |
| 22 | FW | SCO | Darryl Duffy |
| 23 | DF | ENG | Sam Collins |
| 24 | FW | ENG | Kevin Ellison |
| 25 | FW | ENG | Billy Paynter |
| 26 | DF | SCO | Robbie Stockdale |
| 27 | FW | ENG | Craig Fagan |
| 28 | MF | ENG | Russell Fry |
| 29 | MF | ENG | Ryan France |
| 30 | DF | GIB | Scott Wiseman |
| 31 | DF | ENG | Alan Rogers (on loan from Nottingham Forest) |
| 32 | GK | ENG | Curtis Aspden |

=== Left club during season ===
Note: Flags indicate national team as defined under FIFA eligibility rules; some limited exceptions apply. Players may hold more than one non-FIFA nationality.

| No. | Pos. | Nation | Player |
|---|---|---|---|
| 19 | MF | ENG | Junior Lewis (to Brentford) |
| 22 | FW | ENG | Chris Brown (on loan from Sunderland) |
| 32 | MF | ENG | Paul Anderson (to Liverpool) |
| 15 | DF | WAL | Roland Edge (to Folkestone Invicta) |
| 6 | DF | ANT | Marc Joseph (to Blackpool) |

| No. | Pos. | Nation | Player |
|---|---|---|---|
| 18 | DF | WAL | Jason Price (to Doncaster Rovers) |
| 11 | MF | ENG | Curtis Woodhouse (to Grimsby Town) |
| 13 | GK | POR | Sérgio Leite (to FC Vaslui) |
| 11 | MF | ENG | Mark Noble (on loan from West Ham United) |

== Statistics ==
=== Appearances, goals and cards ===
(Starting appearances + substitute appearances)

| No. | Pos. | Name | League | | FA Cup | | League Cup | | Total | | Discipline | |
| No. | Pos. | Name | Apps | Goals | Apps | Goals | Apps | Goals | Apps | Goals | Yellow card | Red card |
|---|---|---|---|---|---|---|---|---|---|---|---|---|
| 1 | GK | (Wales) Boaz Myhill | 45 | 0 | 1 | 0 | 0 | 0 | 46 | 0 | 4 | 1 |
| 2 | DF | (England) Mark Lynch | 15+1 | 0 | 0+1 | 0 | 0 | 0 | 15+2 | 0 | 0 | 1 |
| 3 | DF | (England) Andy Dawson | 17+1 | 0 | 1 | 0 | 0 | 0 | 18+1 | 0 | 2 | 0 |
| 4 | DF | (England) Ian Ashbee | 6 | 0 | 0 | 0 | 0 | 0 | 6 | 0 | 1 | 0 |
| 5 | DF | (England) Leon Cort | 42 | 4 | 1 | 0 | 0 | 0 | 43 | 4 | 0 | 0 |
| 6 | DF | (Antigua and Barbuda) Marc Joseph | 2+3 | 0 | 0 | 0 | 1 | 0 | 3+3 | 0 | 1 | 1 |
| 6 | FW | (England) Jon Parkin | 18 | 5 | 0 | 0 | 0 | 0 | 18 | 5 | 2 | 0 |
| 7 | MF | (Northern Ireland) Stuart Elliott | 26+14 | 7 | 0+1 | 0 | 0+1 | 0 | 26+16 | 7 | 5 | 0 |
| 8 | MF | (England) Nick Barmby | 21+5 | 5 | 0 | 0 | 0 | 0 | 21+5 | 5 | 3 | 0 |
| 9 | FW | (Republic of Ireland) Ben Burgess | 3+11 | 2 | 0 | 0 | 1 | 0 | 4+11 | 2 | 0 | 0 |
| 10 | MF | (Scotland) Stephen McPhee | 2+2 | 0 | 0 | 0 | 0 | 0 | 2+2 | 0 | 0 | 0 |
| 11 | MF | (England) Mark Noble | 4+1 | 0 | 0 | 0 | 0 | 0 | 4+1 | 0 | 1 | 0 |
| 11 | MF | (England) Curtis Woodhouse | 14+4 | 0 | 0 | 0 | 1 | 0 | 15+4 | 0 | 5 | 0 |
| 12 | GK | (England) Matt Duke | 1+1 | 0 | 0 | 0 | 0 | 0 | 1+1 | 0 | 0 | 0 |
| 13 | GK | (Portugal) Sérgio Leite | 0 | 0 | 0 | 0 | 1 | 0 | 1 | 0 | 0 | 0 |
| 14 | MF | (England) Stuart Green | 20+18 | 4 | 0+1 | 0 | 1 | 0 | 21+19 | 4 | 1 | 0 |
| 15 | DF | (Angola) Rui Marques | 1 | 0 | 0 | 0 | 0 | 0 | 1 | 0 | 0 | 0 |
| 16 | MF | (Republic of Ireland) Damien Delaney | 45+1 | 0 | 1 | 0 | 1 | 0 | 47+1 | 0 | 4 | 0 |
| 17 | MF | (Republic of Ireland) Keith Andrews | 24+2 | 0 | 1 | 0 | 0 | 0 | 25+2 | 0 | 3 | 0 |
| 18 | DF | (Wales) Jason Price | 10+5 | 2 | 1 | 0 | 1 | 1 | 12+5 | 3 | 1 | 0 |
| 19 | DF | (England) John Welsh | 29+3 | 2 | 0 | 0 | 1 | 0 | 30+3 | 2 | 2 | 0 |
| 20 | DF | (England) Alton Thelwell | 7+2 | 0 | 0 | 0 | 0 | 0 | 7+2 | 0 | 0 | 0 |
| 21 | DF | (England) Danny Coles | 9 | 0 | 0 | 0 | 0 | 0 | 9 | 0 | 0 | 0 |
| 22 | FW | (England) Chris Brown | 13 | 1 | 0 | 0 | 0 | 0 | 13 | 1 | 2 | 0 |
| 22 | FW | (Scotland) Darryl Duffy | 5+10 | 3 | 0 | 0 | 0 | 0 | 5+10 | 3 | 1 | 0 |
| 23 | DF | (England) Sam Collins | 17 | 0 | 1 | 0 | 0 | 0 | 18 | 0 | 2 | 0 |
| 24 | FW | (England) Kevin Ellison | 15+8 | 1 | 1 | 0 | 1 | 0 | 17+8 | 1 | 2 | 0 |
| 25 | FW | (England) Billy Paynter | 11+11 | 3 | 1 | 0 | 0 | 0 | 12+11 | 3 | 2 | 0 |
| 27 | FW | (England) Craig Fagan | 29+12 | 5 | 1 | 0 | 0+1 | 0 | 30+13 | 5 | 5 | 0 |
| 28 | MF | (England) Russell Fry | 0+1 | 0 | 0 | 0 | 0 | 0 | 0+1 | 0 | 0 | 0 |
| 29 | MF | (England) Ryan France | 30+5 | 2 | 1 | 0 | 0+1 | 0 | 31+6 | 2 | 4 | 0 |
| 30 | DF | (England) Scott Wiseman | 8+3 | 0 | 0 | 0 | 1 | 0 | 9+3 | 0 | 1 | 0 |
| 31 | DF | (England) Alan Rogers | 9 | 0 | 0 | 0 | 0 | 0 | 9 | 0 | 0 | 0 |
