= Andy Dawson (footballer, born 1978) =

English footballer (born 1978)

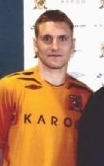
- Dawson in 2007

Personal information
- Full name: Andrew Stuart Dawson
- Date of birth: 20 October 1978 (age 48)
- Place of birth: Northallerton, England
- Height: 1.75 m (5 ft 9 in)
- Position: Left-back

Team information
- Current team: Hull City (head of player performance)

Youth career
- –1997: Nottingham Forest

Senior career*
Years	Team	Apps	(Gls)
1997–1999	Nottingham Forest	0	(0)
1998–1999	→ Scunthorpe United (loan)	12	(0)
1999–2003	Scunthorpe United	184	(8)
2003–2013	Hull City	293	(8)
2013–2015	Scunthorpe United	21	(0)
Total		510	(16)

Managerial career
- 2014: Scunthorpe United (caretaker)
- 2019: Scunthorpe United (caretaker)
- 2022: Hull City (caretaker)
- 2024: Hull City (caretaker)
- * Club domestic league appearances and goals

Andrew Stuart Dawson (born 20 October 1978) is an English professional football coach and former player who is currently the head of player development at Premier League club Hull City.

As a player he was a left-back from 1997 to 2015. Having departed Nottingham Forest as a youngster he joined Scunthorpe United permanently following a loan spell. He played for United on two occasions during his career having also spent ten years with Hull City.

== Playing career ==
=== Early career ===
Born in Northallerton, North Yorkshire, Dawson is the elder brother of Michael Dawson (formerly of Tottenham Hotspur) and Kevin Dawson (formerly of Chesterfield). Like his brothers, Andy started his professional career at Nottingham Forest, but he made only one senior appearance for them before moving to Scunthorpe for £45,000.

=== Hull City ===
Dawson moved to Hull City on 16 May 2003 on a free transfer from Scunthorpe United. During his several years at the club, he wore the captain's armband on many occasions.

==== Rise up the Football League ====
Arriving in the summer, he was quickly established as manager Peter Taylor's first choice at left-back during the two promotion seasons 2003–04 and 2004–05, and played regularly in the Championship in 2005–06 until picking up an injury. He was named Hull City's Player of the Year in the 2006–07 season. Dawson was also a regular in the 2007–08 season as Hull were promoted, starting for the playoff final on 24 May 2008 at Wembley.

==== Premier League years ====
Along with teammates Ian Ashbee, Boaz Myhill and Ryan France he joins an elite band of players to have taken their club up through four divisions.

In 2008 Dawson completed Soccer AM's Crossbar Challenge.

For both of Hull's first two seasons in the top flight of English football, Dawson was virtually ever-present in the side, also contributing one goal each season, both free kicks, the first against Stoke in 2009, and the second against Everton the following season.

==== Return to the Championship ====
Following Hull's relegation to the Championship, Dawson remained a constant in the side under new manager Nigel Pearson. On 3 January 2011, Dawson agreed a one-year contract extension with Hull City, due to expire in June 2012. When Nick Barmby was appointed Hull City manager, he reinstated Dawson to the starting line-up. Dawson retained his place for the remainder of the 2011–12 season, and on 7 April 2012 replaced the injured Jack Hobbs as acting captain. Following Barmby's dismissal as manager of Hull City, Dawson's future was left uncertain, especially due to the presence of the younger Joe Dudgeon as a rival for the left-back position. However, on 6 July 2012 Dawson signed a new one-year deal with Hull City, earning him a testimonial, having completed ten years of service at the club through all four divisions. In the 2012–13 season, Dawson became the first player in the club's history to win four promotions, with City finishing in second place in the Championship to earn automatic promotion.

Dawson was released, however, on 16 May 2013, along with 11 other Hull City players, meaning that he would not be returning to the Premier League with Hull City.

==== Testimonial ====
On 21 November 2012, Andy Dawson officially launched a series of testimonial events, raising money for the Daisy Appeal in East Yorkshire. This was supported through social networking on Facebook and Twitter. On 10 August 2013, Hull City played Spanish side Real Betis in Andy Dawson's official testimonial game; the match ended 3–0. Before the main match, Dawson took part in a special 'legends game' involving a host of former Hull City players.

== Coaching career ==
=== Scunthorpe United ===
It was announced on 30 May 2013, that Dawson had signed for Scunthorpe United on a one-year player/coach deal.

On 11 October 2014, Dawson took charge of Scunthorpe United along with Tony Daws in a caretaker manager role for a league game away at Gillingham, The Iron won the game 3–0.

On 24 March 2019, Dawson again took over Scunthorpe United as caretaker manager, replacing Stuart McCall until the end of the season.

=== Hull City ===
On 23 September 2019, Dawson returned to the Hull City as part of the Academy Coaching Staff. On 13 May 2022, Dawson was promoted to first team coach following the departure of Tony Pennock. On 30 September 2022, Dawson was appointed as interim head coach after Shota Arveladze was sacked after a run of four league defeats. Dawson oversaw the team achieve nine points across the seven matches he oversaw during his interim spell, returning to the backroom staff following the permanent appointment of Liam Rosenior on 3 November 2022. On 31 December 2022, Dawson was inducted into the Hull City Hall of Fame. On 27 November 2024, Dawson again took the roll of interim head coach when the club parted ways with head coach Tim Walter, following a run of four straight defeats and nine games without a win. In June 2025 Dawson started a new role at Hull City as Head Of Player Development working with the clubs academy and first team players.

== Style of play ==
Dawson is renowned for his long-range shots, particularly from free-kicks. He is a traditional left-back, and when playing sports his trademark Umbro Speciali black boots, with old-fashioned white sock ties.

== Personal life ==
Andy Dawson is the older brother of former Tottenham Hotspur captain Michael, and former Chesterfield defender Kevin.

== Career statistics ==
Appearances and goals by club, season and competition
Club	Season	League			FA Cup		League Cup		Other		Total	
Club	Season	Division	Apps	Goals	Apps	Goals	Apps	Goals	Apps	Goals	Apps	Goals
Nottingham Forest	1997–98	First Division	0	0	0	0	0	0	0	0	0	0
Nottingham Forest	1998–99	Premier League	0	0	0	0	1	0	0	0	1	0
Nottingham Forest	Total		0	0	0	0	1	0	0	0	1	0
Scunthorpe United (loan)	1998–99	Third Division	12	0	0	0	0	0	1	0	13	0
Scunthorpe United	1998–99	Third Division	13	0	0	0	0	0	0	0	13	0
Scunthorpe United	1999–2000	Second Division	43	2	1	0	2	0	0	0	46	2
Scunthorpe United	2000–01	Third Division	41	4	5	1	2	0	1	0	49	5
Scunthorpe United	2001–02	Third Division	44	0	2	0	1	0	3	0	50	0
Scunthorpe United	2002–03	Third Division	43	2	4	0	1	0	3	1	51	3
Scunthorpe United	Total		196	8	12	1	6	0	8	1	222	10
Hull City	2003–04	Third Division	33	3	1	0	0	0	0	0	34	3
Hull City	2004–05	League One	34	0	3	0	1	0	0	0	38	0
Hull City	2005–06	Championship	18	0	1	0	0	0	0	0	19	0
Hull City	2006–07	Championship	38	2	2	0	3	0	0	0	43	2
Hull City	2007–08	Championship	29	1	0	0	2	0	3	0	34	1
Hull City	2008–09	Premier League	25	1	3	0	0	0	0	0	28	1
Hull City	2009–10	Premier League	35	1	0	0	0	0	0	0	35	1
Hull City	2010–11	Championship	45	0	1	0	0	0	0	0	46	0
Hull City	2011–12	Championship	32	0	0	0	1	0	0	0	33	0
Hull City	2012–13	Championship	4	0	2	0	1	0	0	0	7	0
Hull City	Total		293	8	13	0	8	0	3	0	317	8
Scunthorpe United	2013–14	League Two	18	0	2	0	1	0	1	0	22	0
Scunthorpe United	2014–15	League Two	3	0	0	0	1	0	1	0	5	0
Scunthorpe United	Total		21	0	2	0	2	0	2	0	27	0
Career total			510	16	27	1	17	0	13	1	567	18

== Honours ==
Scunthorpe United

- Football League Third Division play-offs: 1999

Hull City

- Football League Championship play-offs: 2008
- Football League Championship runner-up: 2012–13
- Football League One runner-up: 2004–05
- Football League Third Division runner-up: 2003–04

Individual

- PFA Team of the Year: 2003–04 Third Division
- Hull City Player of the Year: 2006–07
