= List of EFL League One seasons =

This article lists seasons played in the third tier of English football from 2004–05, when the Football League Division Two was renamed the Football League One.

== Seasons ==
| Season | Champions | | Runners-up | | Play-off winners | Relegated from League One | Relegated to League One | Promoted to League One | Top goal scorers | |
| Season | Club | Pts | Club | Pts | Club | Relegated from League One | Relegated to League One | Promoted to League One | Player | Goals |
|---|---|---|---|---|---|---|---|---|---|---|
| 2004–05 | Luton Town | 98 | Hull City | 86 | Sheffield Wednesday | Torquay United; Wrexham; Peterborough United; Stockport County | Gillingham; Nottingham Forest; Rotherham United | Yeovil Town; Scunthorpe United; Swansea City; Southend United | Dean Windass (Bradford City) & Stuart Elliott (Hull City) | 27 |
| 2005–06 | Southend United | 82 | Colchester United | 79 | Barnsley | Hartlepool United; Milton Keynes Dons; Swindon Town; Walsall | Crewe Alexandra; Millwall; Brighton & Hove Albion | Carlisle United; Northampton Town; Leyton Orient; Cheltenham Town | Freddy Eastwood (Southend United) & Billy Sharp (Scunthorpe United) | 23 |
| 2006–07 | Scunthorpe United | 91 | Bristol City | 85 | Blackpool | Chesterfield; Bradford City; Rotherham United; Brentford | Southend United; Luton Town; Leeds United | Walsall; Hartlepool United; Swindon Town; Bristol Rovers | Billy Sharp (Scunthorpe United) | 30 |
| 2007–08 | Swansea City | 92 | Nottingham Forest | 82 | Doncaster Rovers | Bournemouth; Gillingham; Port Vale; Luton Town | Leicester City; Scunthorpe United; Colchester United | Milton Keynes Dons; Peterborough United; Hereford United; Stockport County | Jason Scotland (Swansea City) | 24 |
| 2008–09 | Leicester City | 96 | Peterborough United | 89 | Scunthorpe United | Northampton Town; Crewe Alexandra; Cheltenham Town; Hereford United | Norwich City; Southampton; Charlton Athletic | Brentford; Exeter City; Wycombe Wanderers; Gillingham | Rickie Lambert (Bristol Rovers) & Simon Cox (Swindon Town) | 29 |
| 2009–10 | Norwich City | 95 | Leeds United | 86 | Millwall | Gillingham; Wycombe Wanderers; Southend United; Stockport County | Sheffield Wednesday; Plymouth Argyle; Peterborough United | Notts County; Bournemouth; Rochdale; Dagenham & Redbridge | Rickie Lambert (Southampton) | 30 |
| 2010–11 | Brighton & Hove Albion | 95 | Southampton | 92 | Peterborough United | Dagenham & Redbridge; Bristol Rovers; Plymouth Argyle; Swindon Town | Preston North End; Sheffield United; Scunthorpe United | Chesterfield; Bury; Wycombe Wanderers; Stevenage | Craig Mackail-Smith (Peterborough United) | 27 |
| 2011–12 | Charlton Athletic | 101 | Sheffield Wednesday | 93 | Huddersfield Town | Wycombe Wanderers; Chesterfield; Exeter City; Rochdale | Portsmouth; Coventry City; Doncaster Rovers | Swindon Town; Shrewsbury Town; Crawley Town; Crewe Alexandra | Jordan Rhodes (Huddersfield Town) | 36 |
| 2012–13 | Doncaster Rovers | 84 | Bournemouth | 83 | Yeovil Town | Scunthorpe United; Bury; Hartlepool United; Portsmouth | Peterborough United; Wolverhampton Wanderers; Bristol City | Gillingham; Rotherham United; Port Vale; Bradford City | Paddy Madden (Yeovil Town & Carlisle United) | 23 |
| 2013–14 | Wolverhampton Wanderers | 103 | Brentford | 94 | Rotherham United | Tranmere Rovers; Carlisle United; Shrewsbury Town; Stevenage | Doncaster Rovers; Barnsley; Yeovil Town | Chesterfield; Scunthorpe United; Rochdale; Fleetwood Town | Sam Baldock (Bristol City) | 24 |
| 2014–15 | Bristol City | 99 | Milton Keynes Dons | 91 | Preston North End | Notts County; Crawley Town; Leyton Orient; Yeovil Town | Millwall; Wigan Athletic; Blackpool | Burton Albion; Shrewsbury Town; Bury; Southend United | Joe Garner (Preston North End) | 25 |
| 2015–16 | Wigan Athletic | 87 | Burton Albion | 85 | Barnsley | Doncaster Rovers; Blackpool; Colchester United; Crewe Alexandra | Charlton Athletic; Milton Keynes Dons; Bolton Wanderers | Northampton Town; Oxford United; Bristol Rovers; AFC Wimbledon | Will Grigg (Wigan Athletic) | 25 |
| 2016–17 | Sheffield United | 100 | Bolton Wanderers | 86 | Millwall | Port Vale; Swindon Town; Coventry City; Chesterfield | Blackburn Rovers; Wigan Athletic; Rotherham United | Portsmouth; Plymouth Argyle; Doncaster Rovers; Blackpool | Billy Sharp (Sheffield United) | 30 |
| 2017–18 | Wigan Athletic | 98 | Blackburn Rovers | 96 | Rotherham United | Oldham; Northampton Town; Milton Keynes Dons; Bury | Sunderland; Burton Albion; Barnsley | Accrington Stanley; Luton Town; Wycombe Wanderers; Coventry City | Jack Marriott (Peterborough United) | 27 |
| 2018–19 | Luton Town | 94 | Barnsley | 91 | Charlton Athletic | Plymouth Argyle; Walsall; Scunthorpe United; Bradford City | Rotherham United; Bolton Wanderers; Ipswich Town | Lincoln City; Milton Keynes Dons; Tranmere Rovers; Bury | James Collins (Luton Town) | 25 |
| 2019–20 (Note: The 2019–20 season was curtailed due to the COVID-19 pandemic, with the final league positions being determined on a points-per-game basis. Coventry City averaged 1.97 points from 34 games, whilst Rotherham United averaged 1.77 points from 35 games.) | Coventry City | 67 | Rotherham United | 62 | Wycombe Wanderers | Tranmere Rovers; Southend United; Bolton Wanderers; Bury (expelled) | Charlton Athletic; Wigan Athletic; Hull City | Swindon Town; Crewe Alexandra; Plymouth Argyle; Northampton Town | Ivan Toney (Peterborough United) | 24 |
| 2020–21 | Hull City | 89 | Peterborough United | 87 | Blackpool | Rochdale; Northampton Town; Swindon Town; Bristol Rovers | Wycombe Wanderers; Rotherham United; Sheffield Wednesday | Cheltenham Town; Cambridge United; Bolton Wanderers; Morecambe | Jonson Clarke-Harris (Peterborough United) | 31 |
| 2021–22 | Wigan Athletic | 92 | Rotherham United | 90 | Sunderland | Gillingham; Doncaster Rovers; AFC Wimbledon; Crewe Alexandra | Peterborough United; Derby County; Barnsley | Forest Green Rovers; Exeter City; Bristol Rovers; Port Vale | Will Keane (Wigan Athletic) | 26 |
| 2022–23 | Plymouth Argyle | 101 | Ipswich Town | 98 | Sheffield Wednesday | Milton Keynes Dons; Morecambe; Accrington Stanley; Forest Green Rovers | Reading; Blackpool; Wigan Athletic | Leyton Orient; Stevenage; Northampton Town; Carlisle United | Conor Chaplin (Ipswich Town) & Jonson Clarke-Harris (Peterborough United) | 26 |
| 2023–24 | Portsmouth | 97 | Derby County | 92 | Oxford United | Cheltenham Town; Fleetwood Town; Port Vale; Carlisle United | Birmingham City; Huddersfield Town; Rotherham United | Stockport County; Wrexham; Mansfield Town; Crawley Town | Alfie May (Charlton Athletic) | 23 |
| 2024–25 | Birmingham City | 111 | Wrexham | 92 | Charlton Athletic | Crawley Town Bristol Rovers Cambridge United Shrewsbury Town | Luton Town; Plymouth Argyle; Cardiff City | Doncaster Rovers Port Vale Bradford City AFC Wimbledon | Charlie Kelman (Leyton Orient) | 21 |
