= Milton Keynes Dons F.C. league record by opponent =

Association football club based in Milton Keynes, Buckinghamshire, England

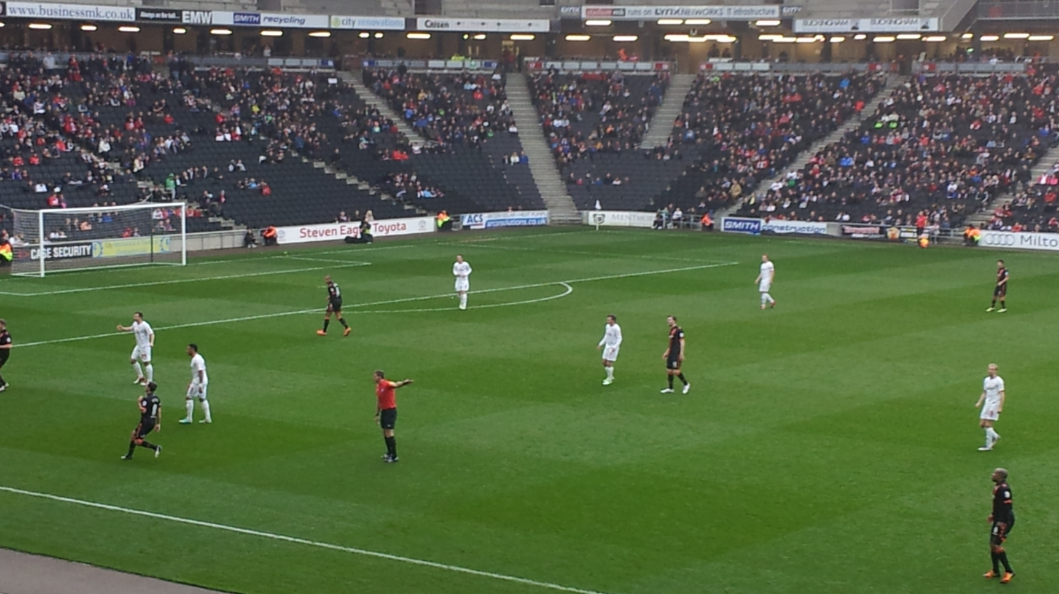
The MK Dons (white kit) in a home match against Sheffield United who they have played 10 times.

Milton Keynes Dons Football Club is an English association football club based in Milton Keynes, Buckinghamshire that has competed in the English Football League (Championship, League One and League Two, the second, third and fourth tiers in English football respectively) since the team was founded. The club found itself in League One after Wimbledon F.C. relocated to Milton Keynes in 2003. The club gave back Wimbledon's trophies to the London Borough of Merton in 2007, and since then, officially, the club is considered to have been founded in 2004. The MK Dons currently compete in League Two as of the 2023–24 season.

The Dons record against each club faced in league competition is summarised below. The team's first league match was contested with Barnsley in the opening game of the 2004–05 Football League One season. They met their 93rd and most recent different league opponent, Salford City, for the first time in the 2023–24 EFL League Two season. The teams that the MK Dons have met most in league competition are Swindon Town and Walsall, against whom they have contested 26 league matches. The team has won 14 matches against Swindon, the most they have won against any team. 10 of the matches against Walsall have ended in a draw, the most draws registered by the club. Peterborough United have defeated the MK Dons 13 times each which is the most the MK Dons have lost against any team.

== Key ==
- The table includes results of matches played by Milton Keynes Dons in the English Football League (Championship, League One and League Two).
- † Teams with this background and symbol in the "Club" column are competing in the 2024–25 EFL League Two alongside Milton Keynes Dons.
- ‡ Clubs with this background and symbol in the "Club" column are defunct.
- P = matches played; W = matches won; D = matches drawn; L = matches lost; F = Goals scored (For); A = Goals conceded (Against); Win% = percentage of total matches won
- The columns headed "First" and "Last" contain the first and most recent seasons in which Milton Keynes Dons played league matches against each opponent

== All-time league record ==
All statistics are correct up to and including the match played 27 April 2024.

Milton Keynes Dons F.C. league record by opponent
Club	Home				Away				Total						Win%	First	Last	Notes
Club	P	W	D	L	P	W	D	L	P	W	D	L	F	A	Win%	First	Last	Notes
Accrington Stanley †	6	5	1	0	7	3	1	3	13	8	2	3	25	14	61.54	2006–07	2023–24	(Note: Because of the COVID-19 pandemic, the 2019–20 EFL League One season was suspended in mid-March 2020. On 9 June, the clubs voted to curtail the season; Milton Keynes Dons' last nine matches, which included one against this opponent, remained unplayed.)
AFC Bournemouth	5	1	2	2	5	2	1	2	10	3	3	4	12	16	30.00	2004–05	2012–13	
AFC Wimbledon †	6	4	2	0	5	2	1	2	11	6	3	2	13	7	54.55	2016–17	2023–24	
Barnet	2	1	0	1	2	1	1	0	4	2	1	1	8	5	50.00	2006–07	2007–08	
Barnsley	4	1	3	0	4	1	1	2	8	2	4	2	14	14	25.00	2004–05	2022–23	
Barrow †	1	0	1	0	1	0	0	1	2	0	1	1	2	3	0.00	2023–24	2023–24	
Birmingham City	1	0	0	1	1	0	0	1	2	0	0	2	0	3	0.00	2015–16	2015–16	
Blackburn Rovers	2	1	0	1	2	0	0	2	4	1	0	3	7	9	25.00	2015–16	2017–18	
Blackpool	4	2	1	1	5	1	0	4	9	3	1	5	11	8	33.33	2004–05	2020–21	
Bolton Wanderers	5	3	1	1	5	0	2	3	10	3	3	4	10	16	30.00	2015–16	2022–23	
Boston United	1	1	0	0	1	1	0	0	2	2	0	0	4	2	100.00	2006–07	2006–07	
Bradford City †	8	3	0	5	8	2	1	5	16	5	1	10	23	31	31.25	2004–05	2023–24	
Brentford	9	1	4	4	9	2	2	5	18	3	6	9	22	28	16.67	2004–05	2015–16	
Brighton & Hove Albion	4	2	1	1	4	2	0	2	8	4	1	3	10	8	50.00	2008–09	2015–16	
Bristol City	5	0	2	3	5	0	3	2	10	0	5	5	11	19	0.00	2004–05	2015–16	
Bristol Rovers	9	6	1	2	9	4	2	3	18	10	3	5	25	14	55.56	2006–07	2022–23	
Burnley	1	0	0	1	1	0	0	1	2	0	0	2	1	7	0.00	2015–16	2015–16	
Burton Albion	4	1	2	1	4	2	1	1	8	3	3	2	6	7	37.50	2019–20	2022–23	
Bury	7	4	1	2	7	4	2	1	14	8	3	3	26	15	57.14	2006–07	2018–19	
Cambridge United	3	3	0	0	3	2	0	1	6	5	0	1	13	2	83.33	2018–19	2022–23	
Cardiff City	1	1	0	0	1	0	1	0	2	1	1	0	2	1	50.00	2015–16	2015–16	
Carlisle United †	7	4	0	3	7	2	1	4	14	6	1	7	24	29	42.86	2008–09	2018–19	
Charlton Athletic	9	3	1	5	9	4	2	3	18	7	3	8	18	18	38.89	2009–10	2022–23	
Cheltenham Town †	4	3	1	0	4	1	2	1	8	4	3	1	18	11	50.00	2008–09	2022–23	
Chester City ‡	2	1	0	1	2	2	0	0	4	3	0	1	7	2	75.00	2006–07	2007–08	
Chesterfield †	6	1	2	3	6	3	3	0	12	4	5	3	19	15	33.33	2004–05	2016–17	
Colchester United †	11	6	4	1	11	7	0	4	22	13	4	5	39	19	59.09	2004–05	2023–24	
Coventry City	5	1	2	2	5	2	2	1	10	3	4	3	11	12	30.00	2012–13	2019–20	
Crawley Town	5	3	1	1	5	2	1	2	10	5	2	3	14	8	50.00	2012–13	2023–24	
Crewe Alexandra †	8	5	1	2	8	2	2	4	16	7	3	6	28	20	43.75	2008–09	2023–24	
Dagenham & Redbridge	2	2	0	0	2	2	0	0	4	4	0	0	8	0	100.00	2007–08	2010–11	
Darlington	2	2	0	0	2	1	0	1	4	3	0	1	3	1	75.00	2006–07	2007–08	
Derby County	2	0	0	2	2	1	1	0	4	1	1	2	4	7	25.00	2015–16	2022–23	
Doncaster Rovers †	9	4	0	5	9	0	5	4	18	4	5	9	17	22	22.22	2004–05	2023–24	
Exeter City	5	3	1	1	5	2	1	2	10	5	2	3	12	9	50.00	2009–10	2022–23	
Fleetwood Town †	6	3	1	2	7	2	3	2	13	5	4	4	20	14	38.46	2014–15	2022–23	
Forest Green Rovers	3	2	1	0	3	3	0	0	6	5	1	0	10	3	83.33	2018–19	2023–24	
Fulham	1	0	1	0	1	0	0	1	2	0	1	1	2	3	0.00	2015–16	2015–16	
Gillingham †	9	6	1	2	10	2	1	7	19	8	2	9	31	31	42.11	2005–06	2023–24	
Grimsby Town †	4	1	2	1	4	2	0	2	8	3	2	3	9	7	37.50	2006–07	2023–24	
Harrogate Town †	1	0	0	1	1	1	0	0	2	1	0	1	5	4	50.00	2023–24	2023–24	
Hartlepool United	8	5	3	0	8	4	1	3	16	9	4	3	26	16	56.25	2004–05	2012–13	
Hereford United ‡	3	1	1	1	3	2	1	0	6	3	2	1	6	3	50.00	2006–07	2008–09	
Huddersfield Town	7	1	4	2	7	1	1	5	14	2	5	7	16	29	14.29	2004–05	2015–16	
Hull City	3	0	1	2	3	1	1	1	6	1	2	3	6	10	16.67	2004–05	2020–21	
Ipswich Town	5	0	2	3	4	0	2	2	9	0	4	5	5	12	0.00	2015–16	2022–23	
Leeds United	3	1	0	2	3	0	1	2	6	1	1	4	6	11	16.67	2008–09	2015–16	
Leicester City	1	0	1	0	1	0	0	1	2	0	1	1	2	4	0.00	2008–09	2008–09	
Leyton Orient	7	4	0	3	7	3	2	2	14	7	2	5	26	18	50.00	2008–09	2014–15	
Lincoln City	7	3	2	2	7	3	2	2	14	6	4	4	22	21	42.86	2006–07	2022–23	
Luton Town	1	0	0	1	1	0	0	1	2	0	0	2	1	5	0.00	2004–05	2004–05	
Macclesfield Town	3	2	1	0	3	2	1	0	6	4	2	0	14	6	66.67	2006–07	2018–19	
Mansfield Town	4	2	1	1	4	2	1	1	8	4	2	2	10	10	50.00	2006–07	2023–24	
Middlesbrough	1	0	1	0	1	0	0	1	2	0	1	1	1	3	0.00	2015–16	2015–16	
Millwall	3	0	1	2	3	1	0	2	6	1	1	4	10	11	16.67	2008–09	2016–17	
Morecambe †	5	3	1	1	5	4	0	1	10	7	1	2	21	8	70.00	2007–08	2023–24	
Newport County †	2	2	0	0	2	1	1	0	4	3	1	0	6	0	75.00	2018–19	2023–24	
Northampton Town	5	4	1	0	5	1	2	2	10	5	3	2	17	13	50.00	2008–09	2020–21	
Norwich City	1	1	0	0	1	0	1	0	2	1	1	0	3	2	50.00	2009–10	2009–10	
Nottingham Forest	2	1	0	1	2	0	0	2	4	1	0	3	3	7	25.00	2005–06	2015–16	
Notts County †	9	7	2	0	9	5	3	1	18	12	5	1	38	20	66.67	2006–07	2023–24	
Oldham Athletic	12	7	4	1	12	6	0	6	24	13	4	7	46	28	54.17	2004–05	2018–19	
Oxford United	6	1	4	1	5	1	0	4	11	2	4	5	10	14	18.18	2016–17	2022–23	
Peterborough United	12	3	3	6	11	3	1	7	23	6	4	13	24	37	26.09	2004–05	2022–23	
Plymouth Argyle	5	1	1	3	5	2	0	3	10	3	1	6	12	15	30.00	2010–11	2022–23	
Port Vale †	7	3	3	1	7	1	2	4	14	4	5	5	13	12	28.57	2004–05	2022–23	
Portsmouth	6	3	2	1	6	2	1	3	12	5	3	4	16	15	41.67	2012–13	2022–23	
Preston North End	5	0	2	3	5	0	5	0	10	0	7	3	6	10	0.00	2011–12	2015–16	
Queens Park Rangers	1	1	0	0	1	0	0	1	2	1	0	1	2	3	50.00	2015–16	2015–16	
Reading	1	1	0	0	1	0	1	0	2	1	1	0	1	0	50.00	2015–16	2015–16	
Rochdale	9	4	3	2	9	5	1	3	18	9	4	5	31	29	50.00	2006–07	2020–21	
Rotherham United	7	2	2	3	7	3	3	1	14	5	5	4	21	23	35.71	2005–06	2021–22	
Salford City †	1	1	0	0	1	1	0	0	2	2	0	0	7	3	100.00	2023–24	2023–24	
Scunthorpe United	7	2	1	4	7	3	2	2	14	5	3	6	14	13	35.71	2005–06	2017–18	
Sheffield United	5	3	0	2	5	2	1	2	10	5	1	4	7	8	50.00	2011–12	2016–17	
Sheffield Wednesday	6	1	2	3	6	0	3	3	12	1	5	6	15	25	8.33	2004–05	2022–23	
Shrewsbury Town	10	6	2	2	10	2	4	4	20	8	6	6	30	25	40.00	2006–07	2022–23	
Southampton	2	1	0	1	2	0	0	2	4	1	0	3	5	9	25.00	2009–10	2010–11	
Southend United	6	3	1	2	6	2	2	2	12	5	3	4	15	16	41.67	2005–06	2019–20	
Stevenage	4	2	1	1	4	2	0	2	8	4	1	3	15	12	50.00	2011–12	2018–19	
Stockport County	6	3	0	3	6	4	0	2	12	7	0	5	20	20	58.33	2004–05	2023–24	
Sunderland	3	0	1	2	3	2	0	1	6	2	1	3	8	9	33.33	2019–20	2021–22	
Sutton United	1	0	1	0	1	0	1	0	2	0	2	0	5	5	0.00	2023–24	2023–24	
Swansea City	1	0	0	1	1	0	0	1	2	0	0	2	2	6	0.00	2005–06	2005–06	
Swindon Town †	13	8	2	3	13	6	4	3	26	14	6	6	45	27	53.85	2004–05	2023–24	
Torquay United	2	2	0	0	2	1	0	1	4	3	0	1	6	3	75.00	2004–05	2006–07	
Tranmere Rovers †	11	7	1	3	10	5	1	4	21	12	2	7	30	22	57.14	2004–05	2023–24	
Walsall †	13	4	5	4	13	5	5	3	26	9	10	7	33	23	34.62	2004–05	2023–24	
Wigan Athletic	3	1	1	1	3	1	0	2	6	2	1	3	6	11	33.33	2017–18	2021–22	
Wolverhampton Wanderers	2	0	0	2	2	1	1	0	4	1	1	2	3	3	25.00	2013–14	2015–16	
Wrexham	4	3	1	0	4	2	1	1	8	5	2	1	17	8	62.50	2004–05	2023–24	
Wycombe Wanderers	7	4	1	2	7	3	3	1	14	7	4	3	24	17	50.00	2006–07	2022–23	
Yeovil Town	8	5	2	1	8	2	3	3	16	7	5	4	23	13	43.75	2005–06	2018–19	
