= 2006–07 Crystal Palace F.C. season =

English football club season

Crystal Palace
2006–07 season
- Chairman: Simon Jordan
- Manager: Peter Taylor
- Stadium: Selhurst Park
- Championship: 12th
- FA Cup: Fourth round
- League Cup: First round
- Top goalscorer: Morrison (12)
- Average home league attendance: 17,481
| Home colours | Away colours |

During the 2006–07 English football season, Crystal Palace competed in the Football League Championship.

== Season summary ==
Peter Taylor was appointed as manager at Crystal Palace after the club paid Hull City a compensation package of £250,000. Chairman Simon Jordan received praise from Hull chairman Adam Pearson for his conduct in the process of appointing Taylor. Most Palace fans were pleased with this appointment, and were looking forward to an exciting 2006–07 season.

Taylor made a host of summer signings, and despite a start which saw Palace at the top of the table after three games, a terrible run of form saw the Eagles slip down the order, falling to 20th at one stage. Despite this, Jordan was content to leave Taylor in charge of first-team affairs, and his faith was rewarded as Palace picked up their form in the post-Christmas period.

After being unbeaten in eight games, the Eagles lost to Dennis Wise's struggling Leeds United side. Controversy followed the game as Wise revealed an unnamed Leeds player had shared information about the Leeds teamsheet to Taylor's side before the game. Many Palace and Leeds fans believed that former Eagle Shaun Derry might have been the player who shared the information, and though Derry's agent played down these reports, it is notable that Derry rejoined Palace in the following season.

After a season of ups and downs, Palace eventually finished in 12th position.

In June 2007 Jordan succeeded in his High Court battle against Coventry City boss Iain Dowie, with The Hon. Mr Justice Tugendhat ruling that Dowie had lied when negotiating his way out of his contract at Palace. Dowie won the right to appeal and thus the case dragged on, finally being settled out of court the following April for an unknown fee.

== Final league table ==
| Pos | Team | Pld | W | D | L | GF | GA | GD | Pts |
|---|---|---|---|---|---|---|---|---|---|
| 10 | Colchester United | 46 | 20 | 9 | 17 | 70 | 56 | +14 | 69 |
| 11 | Plymouth Argyle | 46 | 17 | 16 | 13 | 63 | 62 | +1 | 67 |
| 12 | Crystal Palace | 46 | 18 | 11 | 17 | 59 | 51 | +8 | 65 |
| 13 | Cardiff City | 46 | 17 | 13 | 16 | 57 | 53 | +4 | 64 |
| 14 | Ipswich Town | 46 | 18 | 8 | 20 | 64 | 59 | +5 | 62 |

Source: RSSSF
Rules for classification: In the Football League goals scored (F) takes precedence over goal difference (GD).

== Results ==
Crystal Palace's score comes first

=== Legend ===
| Win | Draw | Loss |

=== Football League Championship ===
| Date | Opponent | Venue | Result | Attendance | Scorers |
|---|---|---|---|---|---|
| 5 August 2006 | Ipswich Town | A | 2–1 | 25,413 | McAnuff, Scowcroft |
| 8 August 2006 | Southend United | H | 3–1 | 18,072 | Cort, Freedman, Hudson |
| 13 August 2006 | Leeds United | H | 1–0 | 17,218 | Morrison |
| 19 August 2006 | Birmingham City | A | 1–2 | 20,223 | McAnuff |
| 26 August 2006 | Burnley | H | 2–2 | 16,396 | Cort, Scowcroft |
| 9 September 2006 | Luton Town | A | 1–2 | 9,187 | Scowcroft |
| 12 September 2006 | Southampton | H | 0–2 | 17,084 | |
| 16 September 2006 | Norwich City | A | 1–0 | 24,618 | Kuqi |
| 23 September 2006 | Coventry City | H | 1–0 | 16,093 | Morrison |
| 30 September 2006 | Hull City | A | 1–1 | 18,099 | Cort |
| 14 October 2006 | Cardiff City | H | 1–2 | 18,876 | Green |
| 17 October 2006 | West Bromwich Albion | H | 0–2 | 16,105 | |
| 21 October 2006 | Leicester City | A | 1–1 | 28,762 | Soares |
| 28 October 2006 | Plymouth Argyle | H | 0–1 | 17,084 | |
| 31 October 2006 | Sheffield Wednesday | A | 2–3 | 19,034 | Kuqi, Soares |
| 4 November 2006 | Queens Park Rangers | A | 2–4 | 13,989 | Soares, Morrison |
| 11 November 2006 | Stoke City | H | 0–1 | 18,868 | |
| 18 November 2006 | Barnsley | H | 2–0 | 20,159 | Scowcroft, Morrison |
| 25 November 2006 | Preston North End | A | 0–0 | 14,202 | |
| 28 November 2006 | Wolverhampton Wanderers | A | 1–1 | 17,806 | Freedman |
| 2 December 2006 | Queens Park Rangers | H | 3–0 | 17,017 | Freedman, Kuqi, Morrison |
| 9 December 2006 | Colchester United | H | 1–3 | 16,762 | Morrison |
| 16 December 2006 | Derby County | A | 0–1 | 23,875 | |
| 22 December 2006 | Sunderland | H | 1–0 | 17,439 | Hudson |
| 26 December 2006 | Southampton | A | 1–1 | 30,548 | McAnuff |
| 30 December 2006 | Cardiff City | A | 0–0 | 13,704 | |
| 1 January 2007 | Norwich City | H | 3–1 | 16,765 | Hudson, Kuqi, Green |
| 13 January 2007 | Coventry City | A | 4–2 | 16,582 | Fletcher, Kuqi, Cort, McAnuff |
| 20 January 2007 | Hull City | H | 1–1 | 17,012 | Fletcher |
| 30 January 2007 | Sunderland | A | 0–0 | 26,958 | |
| 3 February 2007 | Ipswich Town | H | 2–0 | 17,090 | Cort, Ifill |
| 10 February 2007 | Leeds United | A | 1–2 | 19,228 | Cort |
| 17 February 2007 | Birmingham City | H | 0–1 | 17,233 | |
| 20 February 2007 | Southend United | A | 1–0 | 10,419 | Ifill |
| 24 February 2007 | Luton Town | H | 2–1 | 16,177 | Morrison (2) |
| 3 March 2007 | Burnley | A | 1–1 | 10,659 | Morrison |
| 10 March 2007 | Leicester City | H | 2–0 | 16,969 | Fletcher, Watson (pen) |
| 14 March 2007 | West Bromwich Albion | A | 3–2 | 17,960 | Morrison, Watson (pen), Grabban |
| 17 March 2007 | Plymouth Argyle | A | 0–1 | 11,239 | |
| 31 March 2007 | Sheffield Wednesday | A | 1–2 | 21,523 | Morrison |
| 7 April 2007 | Preston North End | H | 3–0 | 15,985 | Kuqi (2), Cort |
| 9 April 2007 | Stoke City | A | 1–2 | 13,616 | Zakuani (own goal) |
| 14 April 2007 | Wolverhampton Wanderers | H | 2–2 | 17,981 | Hudson, McAnuff |
| 21 April 2007 | Barnsley | A | 0–2 | 10,277 | |
| 29 April 2007 | Derby County | H | 2–0 | 19,545 | Morrison, Kennedy |
| 6 May 2007 | Colchester United | A | 2–0 | 5,857 | Scowcroft, Watson |

=== FA Cup ===
| Round | Date | Opponent | Venue | Result | Attendance | Goalscorers |
|---|---|---|---|---|---|---|
| R3 | 6 January 2007 | Swindon Town | H | 2–1 | 10,238 | Kuqi, McAnuff |
| R4 | 27 January 2007 | Preston North End | H | 0–2 | 8,422 | |

=== League Cup ===
| Round | Date | Opponent | Venue | Result | Attendance | Goalscorers |
|---|---|---|---|---|---|---|
| R1 | 22 August 2006 | Notts County | H | 1–2 | 4,481 | Hughes |

== Players ==
=== First-team squad ===
Squad at end of season

Note: Flags indicate national team as defined under FIFA eligibility rules; some limited exceptions apply. Players may hold more than one non-FIFA nationality.

| No. | Pos. | Nation | Player |
|---|---|---|---|
| 1 | GK | ENG | Scott Flinders |
| 2 | DF | ENG | Matthew Lawrence |
| 3 | DF | ENG | Danny Granville |
| 4 | DF | ENG | Darren Ward |
| 5 | DF | ENG | Mark Hudson |
| 6 | DF | ENG | Leon Cort (Note: Cort was born in Southwark, England, but also qualified to represent Guyana internationally and would make his international debut for Guyana in October 2011.) |
| 7 | MF | JAM | Jobi McAnuff (Note: McAnuff was born in Enfield, England, but also qualified to represent Jamaica internationally through his father and made his international debut for Jamaica in May 2002.) |
| 8 | FW | ENG | James Scowcroft |
| 9 | FW | SCO | Dougie Freedman |
| 11 | FW | IRL | Clinton Morrison (Note: Morrison was born in Wandsworth, England, but also qualified to represent the Republic of Ireland internationally through his grandmother and made his international debut for the Republic of Ireland in August 2001.) |
| 12 | GK | ARG | Julián Speroni |
| 14 | MF | ENG | Ben Watson |
| 15 | MF | IRL | Mark Kennedy |
| 16 | MF | ENG | Tommy Black |
| 17 | MF | NIR | Michael Hughes |
| 18 | DF | ENG | Gary Borrowdale |

| No. | Pos. | Nation | Player |
|---|---|---|---|
| 19 | MF | ENG | Tom Soares |
| 20 | DF | ENG | Danny Butterfield |
| 21 | MF | ENG | Dave Martin |
| 23 | MF | WAL | Carl Fletcher (Note: Fletcher was born in Camberley, England, but also qualified to represent Wales internationally and made his international debut for Wales in 2004.) |
| 25 | MF | ENG | Stuart Green |
| 27 | MF | BRB | Paul Ifill (Note: Ifill was born in Brighton, England, but also qualified to represent Barbados internationally through his parents and made his international debut for Barbados in June 2004.) |
| 28 | GK | HUN | Gábor Király |
| 31 | DF | ENG | Arron Fray |
| 32 | FW | FIN | Shefki Kuqi (Note: Kuqi was born in Vučitrn, Yugoslavia (part of Serbia in 2007, but now part of Kosovo), but was raised in Finland and made his international debut for Finland in August 1999.) |
| 33 | FW | ENG | Lewis Grabban |
| 34 | MF | ENG | Phil Starkey |
| 35 | DF | WAL | Rhoys Wiggins (Note: Wiggins was born in Hillingdon, England, but also qualified to represent Wales internationally and has represented them at U-17, U-19, and U-21 level.) |
| 36 | MF | ENG | Lewwis Spence |
| 37 | FW | ENG | Charlie Sheringham |
| 38 | GK | ENG | David Wilkinson |
| 40 | MF | ENG | Ryan Hall |

=== Left club during season ===
Note: Flags indicate national team as defined under FIFA eligibility rules; some limited exceptions apply. Players may hold more than one non-FIFA nationality.

| No. | Pos. | Nation | Player |
|---|---|---|---|
| 10 | FW | IRL | Jon Macken (Note: Macken was born in Blackley, England, and represented them at U-20 level, but also qualified to represent the Republic of Ireland internationally and made his international debut for the Republic of Ireland in August 2004.) (to Derby County) |
| 22 | FW | GER | Marco Reich (to Kickers Offenbach) |

| No. | Pos. | Nation | Player |
|---|---|---|---|
| 29 | GK | SCO | Iain Turner (on loan from Everton) |
| 30 | FW | HUN | Sándor Torghelle (to Panathinaikos) |

== Transfers ==
=== In ===
| Date | Nation | Position | Name | Club From | Transfer Fee |
|---|---|---|---|---|---|
| 30 June 2006 | (England) | DF | Leon Cort | Hull City | £1.000.000 |
| 11 July 2006 | (Republic of Ireland) | MF | Mark Kennedy | Wolverhampton Wanderers | Free |
| 13 July 2006 | (England) | GK | Scott Flinders | Barnsley | £1,000,000 |
| 25 July 2006 | (England) | FW | James Scowcroft | Coventry City | £500,000 |
| 29 July 2006 | (Wales) | MF | Carl Fletcher | West Ham United | £400,000 |
| 2 August 2006 | (England) | MF | Matthew Lawrence | Millwall | Undisclosed |
| 31 August 2006 | (England) | MF | Stuart Green | Hull City | £75,000 |
| 31 August 2006 | (Finland) | FW | Shefki Kuqi | Blackburn Rovers | £2,500,000 |
| 8 January 2007 | (Barbados) | MF | Paul Ifill | Sheffield United | £750,000 |
| 23 January 2007 | (England) | MF | Dave Martin | Dartford | £25,000 |

=== Out ===
| Date | Nation | Position | Name | Club To | Transfer Fee |
|---|---|---|---|---|---|
| 30 May 2006 | (England) | FW | Andrew Johnson | Everton | £8.600.000 |
| 26 June 2006 | (England) | DF | Fitz Hall | Wigan Athletic | £3.000.000 |
| 4 July 2006 | (England) | MF | Mikele Leigertwood | Sheffield United | £600,000 |
| 12 July 2006 | (England) | MF | Sam Togwell | Barnsley | Undisclosed |
| 19 July 2006 | (Australia) | DF | Tony Popovic | (Qatar) Al-Arabi | Free |
| 1 August 2006 | (England) | DF | Emmerson Boyce | Wigan Athletic | £1,000,000 |
| 31 January 2007 | (England) | FW | Jon Macken | Derby County | Free |
| 31 January 2007 | (Germany) | FW | Marco Reich | Kickers Offenbach | Free |

- (England) Glenn Wilson – (England) Rushden & Diamonds, free
- (England) Nathan Simpson – (England) St Albans City, free
