= 2004–05 Football League =

106th season of the Football League

The Football League
- Season: 2004–05
- Champions: Sunderland
- Promoted: Sunderland; Wigan Athletic; West Ham United
- Relegated: Kidderminster Harriers; Cambridge United
- New Clubs in League: Chester City; Shrewsbury Town

The 2004–05 Football League (known as the Coca-Cola Football League for sponsorship reasons) was the 106th completed season of The Football League.

2004–05 was the first season of the rebranded Football League, with the First, Second and Third Divisions becoming the Football League Championship, Football League One and Football League Two respectively. Coca-Cola replaced the Nationwide Building Society as title sponsor.

Wigan Athletic were promoted to the Premier League as Championship runners-up. They had only been elected to the Football League in 1978, had been the league's fourth-lowest placed club in the 1993–94 season, and before 2003 had never reached the second tier of English football.

Nottingham Forest were relegated from the Championship to League One, becoming the first former European Cup winners to be relegated to the third tier of their domestic league – having won two straight European Cups a quarter of a century earlier. Only ten seasons previously, in 1994–95, they had finished third in the Premier League, and had reached the quarter-finals of the UEFA Cup the following season.

== Events ==
- 3 December 2004 – League One side Wrexham enters financial administration. Under new Football League rules, the club is penalised 10 league points, placing the club in relegation danger.
- 21 January 2005 – Former Chelsea chairman Ken Bates finalises a deal to buy a controlling interest in the debt-riddled Championship club Leeds United.
- 2 April 2005 – Stockport County become the first League team this season to be relegated.
- 29 April 2005 – League Two side Cambridge United enters financial administration, six days after being formally relegated from the Football League.
- 7 June 2005 – George Burley resigns as manager of Derby County, citing differences with the club’s board.
- 24 June 2005 – Former Bolton Wanderers assistant manager Phil Brown becomes Derby County’s fifth manager in four years.

== Final league tables and results ==
The tables below are reproduced here in the exact form that they can be found at The Rec.Sport.Soccer Statistics Foundation website, with home and away statistics separated. Play-off results are from the same website.

== Championship ==
Football League Championship
- Season: 2004–05
- Champions: Sunderland (4th second tier title)
- Direct promotion to FA Premier League: Sunderland, Wigan Athletic
- Promoted to FA Premier League through play-offs: West Ham United
- Relegated: Gillingham, Nottingham Forest, Rotherham United
- Matches: 552
- Goals: 1,342 (2.43 per match)
- Top goalscorer: Nathan Ellington (Wigan Athletic), 24

Pos	Team	Pld	W	D	L	GF	GA	GD	Pts	Promotion, qualification or relegation
1	Sunderland (C, P)	46	29	7	10	76	41	+35	94	Promotion to the FA Premier League
2	Wigan Athletic (P)	46	25	12	9	79	35	+44	87	Promotion to the FA Premier League
3	Ipswich Town	46	24	13	9	85	56	+29	85	Qualification for Championship play-offs
4	Derby County	46	22	10	14	71	60	+11	76	Qualification for Championship play-offs
5	Preston North End	46	21	12	13	67	58	+9	75	Qualification for Championship play-offs
6	West Ham United (O, P)	46	21	10	15	66	56	+10	73	Qualification for Championship play-offs
7	Reading	46	19	13	14	51	44	+7	70	
8	Sheffield United	46	18	13	15	57	56	+1	67	
9	Wolverhampton Wanderers	46	15	21	10	72	59	+13	66	
10	Millwall	46	18	12	16	51	45	+6	66	
11	Queens Park Rangers	46	17	11	18	54	58	−4	62	
12	Stoke City	46	17	10	19	36	38	−2	61	
13	Burnley	46	15	15	16	38	39	−1	60	
14	Leeds United	46	14	18	14	49	52	−3	60	
15	Leicester City	46	12	21	13	49	46	+3	57	
16	Cardiff City	46	13	15	18	48	51	−3	54	
17	Plymouth Argyle	46	14	11	21	52	64	−12	53	
18	Watford	46	12	16	18	52	59	−7	52	
19	Coventry City	46	13	13	20	61	73	−12	52	
20	Brighton & Hove Albion	46	13	12	21	40	65	−25	51	
21	Crewe Alexandra	46	12	14	20	66	86	−20	50	
22	Gillingham (R)	46	12	14	20	45	66	−21	50	Relegation to Football League One
23	Nottingham Forest (R)	46	9	17	20	42	66	−24	44	Relegation to Football League One
24	Rotherham United (R)	46	5	14	27	35	69	−34	29	Relegation to Football League One

Updated to match(es) played on 9 December 2011. Source: Football League Tables
Rules for classification: 1) points; 2) goal difference; 3) number of goals scored.
(C) Champions; (O) Play-off winners; (P) Promoted; (R) Relegated
Locations of the 2004–05 Championship teams

=== Play-offs ===
Semi-finals; 1st leg – 14/15 May; 2nd leg – 18/19 May 2005
3rd	Ipswich Town	2	0	2
6th	West Ham United	2	2	4
4th	Derby County	0	0	0
5th	Preston North End	2	0	2

Final at Millennium Stadium, Cardiff; 30 May 2005
5th	Preston North End	0
6th	West Ham United	1

=== Topscorers ===
Rank	Player	Club	League
1	(England) Nathan Ellington	Wigan Athletic	24
2	(Grenada) Jason Roberts	Wigan Athletic	21
=	(England) Teddy Sheringham	West Ham	21
4	(Finland) Shefki Kuqi	Ipswich Town	20
=	(England) Darren Bent	Ipswich Town	20
6	(Scotland) Kenny Miller	Wolverhampton Wanderers	19
=	(England) Dave Kitson	Reading	19
8	(England) Marlon Harewood	West Ham	18
=	(England) Paul Furlong	Queens Park Rangers	18
10	(England) Richard Cresswell	Preston North End	17
=	(England) Dean Ashton	Crewe Alexandra	17
12	(England) Marcus Stewart	Sunderland	16

== League One ==
Football League One
- Season: 2004–05
- Champions: Luton Town (1st divisional title)
- Direct promotion: Luton Town, Hull City
- Promoted through play-offs: Sheffield Wednesday
- Relegated: Peterborough United, Stockport County, Torquay United, Wrexham
- Matches: 552
- Goals: 1,551 (2.81 per match)
- Top goalscorer: Stuart Elliott (Hull City), 27; Dean Windass (Bradford City), 27

Pos	Team	Pld	W	D	L	GF	GA	GD	Pts	Promotion or relegation
1	Luton Town (C, P)	46	29	11	6	87	48	+39	98	Promotion to Football League Championship
2	Hull City (P)	46	26	8	12	80	53	+27	86	Promotion to Football League Championship
3	Tranmere Rovers	46	22	13	11	73	55	+18	79	Qualification for League One play-offs
4	Brentford	46	22	9	15	57	60	−3	75	Qualification for League One play-offs
5	Sheffield Wednesday (O, P)	46	19	15	12	77	59	+18	72	Qualification for League One play-offs
6	Hartlepool United	46	21	8	17	76	66	+10	71	Qualification for League One play-offs
7	Bristol City	46	18	16	12	74	57	+17	70	
8	Bournemouth	46	20	10	16	77	64	+13	70	
9	Huddersfield Town	46	20	10	16	74	65	+9	70	
10	Doncaster Rovers	46	16	18	12	65	60	+5	66	
11	Bradford City	46	17	14	15	64	62	+2	65	
12	Swindon Town	46	17	12	17	66	68	−2	63	
13	Barnsley	46	14	19	13	69	64	+5	61	
14	Walsall	46	16	12	18	65	69	−4	60	
15	Colchester United	46	14	17	15	60	50	+10	59	
16	Blackpool	46	15	12	19	54	59	−5	57	
17	Chesterfield	46	14	15	17	55	62	−7	57	
18	Port Vale	46	17	5	24	49	59	−10	56	
19	Oldham Athletic	46	14	10	22	60	73	−13	52	
20	Milton Keynes Dons	46	12	15	19	54	68	−14	51	
21	Torquay United (R)	46	12	15	19	55	79	−24	51	Relegation to Football League Two
22	Wrexham (R)	46	13	14	19	62	80	−18	43 (Note: Wrexham deducted 10 points for entering administration.)	Relegation to Football League Two
23	Peterborough United (R)	46	9	12	25	49	73	−24	39	Relegation to Football League Two
24	Stockport County (R)	46	6	8	32	49	98	−49	26	Relegation to Football League Two

Updated to match(es) played on May 2005. Source: Soccerbase
Rules for classification: 1) points; 2) goal difference; 3) number of goals scored.
(C) Champions; (O) Play-off winners; (P) Promoted; (R) Relegated
Notes:
Locations of the 2004–05 League One teams

=== Play-offs ===
Semi-finals; 1st leg – 12/13 May; 2nd leg – 16/17 May 2005
3rd	Tranmere Rovers	0	2	2 (5)
6th	Hartlepool United (pens.)	2	0	2 (6)
4th	Brentford	0	1	1
5th	Sheffield Wednesday	1	2	3

Final at Millennium Stadium, Cardiff; 29 May 2005
5th	Sheffield Wednesday (a.e.t.)	4
6th	Hartlepool United	2

=== Topscorers ===
Rank	Player	Club	League
1	(England) Dean Windass	Bradford City	27
=	(Northern Ireland) Stuart Elliott	Hull City	27
3	(Poland) Paweł Abbott	Huddersfield Town	26
4	(England) Adam Boyd	Hartlepool United	24
=	(England) Leroy Lita	Bristol City	24
6	(England) Sam Parkin	Swindon Town	23
7	(England) Steve Brooker	Bristol City	21
8	(Scotland) Steven MacLean	Sheffield Wednesday	19
=	(England) James Hayter	AFC Bournemouth	19
=	(England) Luke Beckett	Oldham Athletic	19

== League Two ==
Football League Two
- Season: 2004–05
- Champions: Yeovil Town (1st fourth tier title)
- Direct promotion: Yeovil Town, Scunthorpe United, Swansea City
- Promoted through play-offs: Southend United
- Relegated to Conference: Cambridge United, Kidderminster Harriers
- New club in the league: Chester City, Shrewsbury Town
- Matches: 552
- Goals: 1,347 (2.44 per match)
- Top goalscorer: Phil Jevons (Yeovil Town), 27

Pos	Team	Pld	W	D	L	GF	GA	GD	Pts	Promotion or relegation
1	Yeovil Town (C, P)	46	25	8	13	90	65	+25	83	Promotion to League One
2	Scunthorpe United (P)	46	22	14	10	69	42	+27	80	Promotion to League One
3	Swansea City (P)	46	24	8	14	62	43	+19	80	Promotion to League One
4	Southend United (O, P)	46	22	12	12	65	46	+19	78	Qualification for League Two play-offs
5	Macclesfield Town	46	22	9	15	60	49	+11	75	Qualification for League Two play-offs
6	Lincoln City	46	20	12	14	64	47	+17	72	Qualification for League Two play-offs
7	Northampton Town	46	20	12	14	62	51	+11	72	Qualification for League Two play-offs
8	Darlington	46	20	12	14	57	49	+8	72	
9	Rochdale	46	16	18	12	54	48	+6	66	
10	Wycombe Wanderers	46	17	14	15	58	52	+6	65	
11	Leyton Orient	46	16	15	15	65	67	−2	63	
12	Bristol Rovers	46	13	21	12	60	57	+3	60	
13	Mansfield Town	46	15	15	16	56	56	0	60	
14	Cheltenham Town	46	16	12	18	51	54	−3	60	
15	Oxford United	46	16	11	19	50	63	−13	59	
16	Boston United	46	14	16	16	62	58	+4	58	
17	Bury	46	14	16	16	54	54	0	58	
18	Grimsby Town	46	14	16	16	51	52	−1	58	
19	Notts County	46	13	13	20	46	62	−16	52	
20	Chester City	46	12	16	18	43	69	−26	52	
21	Shrewsbury Town	46	11	16	19	48	53	−5	49	
22	Rushden & Diamonds	46	10	14	22	42	63	−21	44	
23	Kidderminster Harriers (R)	46	10	8	28	39	85	−46	38	Relegation to Conference National
24	Cambridge United (R)	46	8	16	22	39	62	−23	30 (Note: Cambridge United deducted 10 points for entering administration)	Relegation to Conference National

Updated to match(es) played on 15 September 2009. Source: 2004–05 League Two
Rules for classification: 1) points; 2) goal difference; 3) number of goals scored.
(C) Champions; (O) Play-off winners; (P) Promoted; (R) Relegated
Notes:
Locations of the 2004–05 League Two teams

=== Play-offs ===
Semi-finals; 1st leg – 14/15 May; 2nd leg – 21 May 2005
4th	Southend United	0	1	1
7th	Northampton Town	0	0	0
5th	Macclesfield Town	0	1	1
6th	Lincoln City	1	1	2

Final at Millennium Stadium, Cardiff; 28 May 2005
4th	Southend United (a.e.t.)	2
6th	Lincoln City	0

=== Topscorers ===
Rank	Player	Club	League
1	(England) Phil Jevons	Yeovil Town	27
2	(Northern Ireland) Andy Kirk	Northampton Town	26
3	(England) Jon Parkin	Macclesfield Town	22
=	(England) Lee Trundle	Swansea City	22
=	(England) Nathan Tyson	Wycombe Wanderers	22
6	(Wales) Freddy Eastwood	Southend United	21
=	(England) Simon Yeo	Lincoln City	21
8	(Ghana) Junior Agogo	Bristol Rovers	19
9	(England) Paul Hayes	Scunthorpe United	17
=	(England) Grant Holt	Rochdale	17

== See also ==
- 2004–05 in English football
- 2004 in association football
- 2005 in association football
