= Stephen McPhee =

Scottish footballer

Personal information
- Full name: Stephen McPhee
- Date of birth: 5 June 1981 (age 45)
- Place of birth: Glasgow, Scotland
- Height: 1.70 m (5 ft 7 in)
- Position: Forward

Youth career
- 1994–1998: Vitesse Arnhem
- 1998–2000: Coventry City

Senior career*
Years	Team	Apps	(Gls)
2000–2001	Coventry City	0	(0)
2001	→ St Mirren (loan)	7	(0)
2001–2004	Port Vale	130	(39)
2004–2005	Beira-Mar	31	(5)
2005–2007	Hull City	35	(2)
2008–2010	Blackpool	24	(3)
Total		227	(49)

International career
2001	Scotland U21	1	(0)
- * Club domestic league appearances and goals

Stephen McPhee (born 5 June 1981) is a Scottish former footballer. In a ten-year career, he played for clubs in the Netherlands, Scotland, England and Portugal. He was capped for his country at under-21 level. A forward, he scored 56 goals in 252 games in all competitions.

Starting his career at Coventry City, following a loan to St Mirren in 2001, he signed with Port Vale later in the year. He made his name at Vale, playing the majority of his career appearances in three years at the club. Leaving the club for Beira-Mar of Portugal in 2005, he made a big money move to Hull City. Two years later, he moved on to Blackpool. He retired in 2010 after being dogged by injury problems since his time in Portugal.

== Club career ==
=== Early career ===
Born in Glasgow, McPhee began his career with his brother Gary at Vitesse Arnhem in the Netherlands. His family were resident in the country due to his father's engineering career. In 1998, he went to England at Coventry City, but did not make a senior appearance for the "Sky Blues", who were then in the Premier League. In 2001, Coventry sent him on loan to Scottish Premier League club St Mirren, who had hoped to sign Ronaldinho, but instead settled for the young hopeful McPhee. He played seven games for the "Saints" and won the April 2001 SPL Young Player of the Month Award. However, Coventry manager Gordon Strachan never played McPhee and the player opted to leave Highfield Road after rejecting a three-year deal.

=== Port Vale ===
McPhee signed for Port Vale on a free transfer in July 2001 and would soon show himself to be arguably Brian Horton's best signing at the club. He scored on his debut against Notts County and finished the season as the club's top scorer with 14 goals in 51 games, including one in the 2001 Potteries derby. Paul Jewell's Wigan Athletic made a bid for McPhee that was accepted by his club (£300,000). However, the deal fell through as the Scotsman's agent rejected Wigan's contract offer. The 2002–03 season was one largely devoid of goals for the striker, his strike against Oldham Athletic in October ended a run of 21 games without a goal, but only two goals followed in the remaining 34 matches as he was played at wide right.

In the 2003–04 season, he formed a strike partnership with Steve Brooker and scored 27 goals to help Vale finish seventh in League One; this was the second-highest goal tally for a Port Vale player in 66 years. For this feat he was named player of the year at Vale Park, but as the team had not secured promotion McPhee rejected a new contract. A British club would have to negotiate a fee with the "Valiants" before talking to McPhee. However, a foreign club would be free to sign him without dealing with Vale.

Rumours linking McPhee with Portuguese side Beira-Mar were denied by the club, and chairman Bill Bratt stated, "this is news to us". The following week the cash-strapped club rejected a £100,000 bid from Leeds United "out of hand", branding it as an offer "not even worth considering".

=== Beira-Mar ===
Later that month, his agent negotiated a move to Beira-Mar, meaning Vale lost the player for nothing. McPhee said the move not about money, but about "bettering himself".

"Port Vale are a two-bob operation and we are a major company. Their concerns, they can stick up their arse."

— McPhee's agent Jonathan Barnett had harsh words for Port Vale.

Beira-Mar were managed at the time by Mick Wadsworth, who was sacked four games after McPhee signed. McPhee was used in various positions and scored five goals in 31 appearances, but despite this Beira-Mar were relegated from the Portuguese top flight in bottom place. Despite the club's poor season his consistent performances attracted interest from other clubs.

=== Hull City ===
McPhee joined Hull City on 19 May 2005 for a fee widely reported to be £220,000. However, the club website stated, "The Scottish striker joined the Championship-bound Tigers in a new club record deal with the McPhee fee reported in excess of £400,000 when Stephen was signed from Beira Mar in May 2005." Regardless of the actual sum, manager Peter Taylor had spent the money to help his side survive in the Championship following their promotion from League One.

He suffered a knee injury in only his fourth league appearance for City, and missed the rest of the 2005–06 season and the start of the 2006–07 season. He eventually returned to action in December 2006 away at Plymouth Argyle, which was also manager Phil Brown's first match in charge of the club. He was a regular first-team presence in the first half of the 2007–08 season, scoring three goals for the club.

=== Blackpool ===
On 7 January 2008, McPhee moved to Blackpool for an undisclosed fee, penning a two-and-a-half-year contract. The fee was £215,000, with the potential to rise to £300,000, depending on appearances. On 4 April 2009, he played his last professional game, replacing Keith Southern 61 minutes into a 1–0 defeat by Plymouth Argyle at Bloomfield Road.

On 26 May 2010, less than a week after Blackpool were promoted to the Premier League, McPhee announced his retirement from football. He had struggled for 18 months with a knee injury, which kept him sidelined for the whole of the previous season.

== International career ==
McPhee won his first Scotland under-21 cap in October 2001 against Latvia U21.

== Style of play ==
McPhee was an energetic and tenacious forward.

== Coaching career ==
In July 2010, Blackpool manager Ian Holloway offered McPhee a coaching role at the club, an offer that the Scot accepted. He left his post 13 months later, citing dissatisfaction at his wage level. In 2012, he returned to another former club, Port Vale, as a youth team coach.

== Personal life ==
McPhee struggled with depression as his career was gradually brought to a premature end due to his injury problems; he attempted suicide. He recovered, and opened his own printing business 'Minuteman Press Cheadle' in 2013. He switched insustries to IT equipment recycling in 2023, a role he left in January 2026.

== Career statistics ==
Appearances and goals by club, season and competition
Club	Season	League			National cup (Note: Includes FA Cup, Taça de Portugal)		League Cup		Other		Total	
Club	Season	Division	Apps	Goals	Apps	Goals	Apps	Goals	Apps	Goals	Apps	Goals
Coventry City	2000–01	Premier League	0	0	0	0	0	0	—		0	0
St Mirren (loan)	2000–01	Scottish Premier League	7	0	—		—		—		7	0
Port Vale	2001–02	Second Division	44	11	2	0	2	2	3 (Note: Appearance(s) in the EFL Trophy.)	1	51	14
Port Vale	2002–03	Second Division	40	3	1	0	1	0	3	0	45	3
Port Vale	2003–04	Second Division	46	25	3	1	1	0	1	1	51	27
Port Vale	Total		130	39	6	1	4	2	7	2	147	44
Beira-Mar	2004–05	Primeira Liga	31	5	3	1	—		—		34	6
Hull City	2005–06	Championship	4	0	0	0	0	0	—		4	0
Hull City	2006–07	Championship	12	0	2	0	0	0	—		14	0
Hull City	2007–08	Championship	19	2	0	0	3	1	—		22	3
Hull City	Total		35	2	2	0	3	1	0	0	40	3
Blackpool	2007–08	Championship	19	3	—		—		—		19	3
Blackpool	2008–09	Championship	0	0	0	0	0	0	—		5	0
Blackpool	Total		24	3	0	0	0	0	0	0	24	3
Career total			227	49	11	2	7	3	7	2	252	56

== Honours ==
Individual

- SPL Young Player of the Month: April 2001
- Port Vale F.C. Player of the Year: 2004
