= Leon Cort =

English footballer (born 1979)

Personal information
- Full name: Leon Terence Anthony Cort
- Date of birth: 11 September 1979 (age 47)
- Place of birth: Bermondsey, England
- Height: 6 ft 4 in (1.93 m)
- Position: Defender

Youth career
- 1997–1998: Dulwich Hamlet

Senior career*
Years	Team	Apps	(Gls)
1998–2001	Millwall	0	(0)
2000–2001	→ Forest Green Rovers (loan)	12	(0)
2001	→ Stevenage Borough (loan)	9	(0)
2001–2004	Southend United	137	(11)
2004–2006	Hull City	86	(10)
2006–2008	Crystal Palace	49	(7)
2007–2008	→ Stoke City (loan)	14	(4)
2008–2010	Stoke City	30	(4)
2010–2012	Burnley	19	(0)
2010–2011	→ Preston North End (loan)	13	(0)
2011–2012	→ Charlton Athletic (loan)	15	(0)
2012–2014	Charlton Athletic	33	(2)
Total		417	(38)

International career
2010–2012	Guyana	6	(1)
- * Club domestic league appearances and goals

Leon Terence Anthony Cort (born 11 September 1979) is a former footballer who played as a defender. He is the younger brother of Carl Cort and the older half-brother of Ruben Loftus-Cheek.

Cort began his career as at non-league side Dulwich Hamlet before turning professional with Millwall in 1998. He was unable to break into the first team at the New Den and after loan spells with Forest Green Rovers and Stevenage Borough he left for Southend United. His career took off at Roots Hall and in 2004 he earned a move to Hull City. He helped the Tigers gain promotion to the Championship in 2004–05.

He joined Crystal Palace in the summer of 2006 before joining Stoke City in October 2007 in a swap deal with Clint Hill. Cort formed a strong defensive partnership with Ryan Shawcross at the Britannia Stadium as Stoke gained promotion to the Premier League. Cort was unable to hold on to his place in the top flight and joined Burnley in January 2010 for a fee of £1.5 million. He then had a short loan spell with Preston North End before ending his career at Charlton Athletic.

Born in England, he represented Guyana at international level.

== Club career ==
=== Southend United ===
Born in Bermondsey, London, Cort began his career at local non-League side Dulwich Hamlet. He was invited by Mick Beard to trial at Millwall before signing pro-forms with his local league club Millwall in 1998. His career at The New Den never really took off, and after a loan spell at Forest Green Rovers and Stevenage Borough he joined Southend United on a free transfer. While at Southend Cort earned rave reviews and was tipped for greater things. He became a regular in the side, achieving a remarkable feat of appearing in 130 consecutive league matches without missing any through injury or suspension.

=== Hull City ===
In May 2004, Cort was offered a new contract at Southend United but soon, Hull City manager Peter Taylor said he would be interested in signing Cort. Cort moved to newly promoted Hull City in the summer of 2004, again on a free transfer. Hull were promoted again that season, to The Championship, and in this division Cort excelled himself as Hull survived comfortably. At the end of the season, Cort signed a two-year extensions. In a game between Hull and Carl's team at the time Wolverhampton Wanderers in 2006, Leon scored for Hull and Carl scored for Wolves.

=== Crystal Palace ===
At the end of that season manager Peter Taylor departed to Crystal Palace and made Cort his first signing for £1.25m, and gave him a return to his native South London. He again impressed and became popular with the Palace fans, winning the Player of the Year Award in 2007. The following season started poorly for the Eagles and saw Taylor sacked and replaced by Neil Warnock, and Cort soon departed on loan to Stoke City.

=== Stoke City ===
Cort's last game for Palace was at Selhurst Park against Stoke. Cort's career at the Britannia Stadium began very well, with assured performances featuring a remarkable tally of eight goals in just six months from the defender helping the Potters gain promotion to the Premier League. However the next season, Cort find himself further down the pecking order as Ryan Shawcross and Abdoulaye Faye was preferred to be used in central defence.

=== Burnley ===
Cort signed for Premier League side Burnley on 27 January 2010 for £1.5 million signing a three-and-a-half-year deal. After appearing on the bench without being used for Burnley, Cort finally made his debut in a 1–1 draw against his former club Stoke City where he made his first start in the Premier League since 2008 when Cort at his former club Stoke. On 6 March 2010, Cort provided his first assist in the Premier League for David Nugent in a 3–1 loss against Arsenal. Following Burnley relegation to Championship after losing 4–0 to Liverpool, Cort believes the Clarets to climb back into the Premier League at the first time of asking.

However, after the Clarets were relegated, he found opportunities limited after reduced of playing time and on 25 November 2010, Cort joined Preston North End on a monthlong loan. On 27 November 2010, Cort made his debut in a 0–0 draw against Millwall. On 1 January 2011, Cort loan spell at Preston has extended until 23 January.

=== Charlton Athletic ===
On 29 August 2011, Cort was once again sent out on loan, this time to Charlton Athletic. Cort made his debut for the club in a 3–2 win over Rochdale on 17 September 2011 as a substitute in the late minute. While at loan at Charlton, Cort made six appearances and didn't get more playing time so he was on the bench without been used due to good central defence performance from Michael Morrison and Matt Taylor. Cort was released by Burnley on 9 January 2012 after not making appearance for the club that season. On 12 January 2012, Cort signed a permanent deal with Charlton. From late March to nearly end of April, Cort able to get more playing time and led the club promoted to the Championship. On 18 August 2012, Cort scored his first league goal for The Addicks, on the opening day of the Championship season, in the 1–1 draw with Birmingham City. On 16 May 2013, Cort signed a one-year contract extension. On 22 May 2014, he was released from Charlton Athletic.

Following his release from Charlton, Cort began training with his former club Southend United but announced his retirement in July 2014.

== International career ==
In October 2011, Cort was called up to Guyana for their 2014 FIFA World Cup qualifiers against Barbados and Bermuda. He scored his only international goal on 11 November 2011 in a World Cup qualifier in a 2–1 win against Trinidad and Tobago.

== Career statistics ==
=== Club ===
Appearances and goals by club, season and competition
Club	Season	League			FA Cup		League Cup		Other		Total	
Club	Season	Division	Apps	Goals	Apps	Goals	Apps	Goals	Apps	Goals	Apps	Goals
Millwall	2000–01	Second Division	0	0	0	0	0	0	0	0	0	0
Forest Green Rovers (loan)	2000–01	Conference National	12	0	0	0	—		0	0	12	0
Stevenage Borough (loan)	2000–01	Conference National	9	0	0	0	—		0	0	9	0
Southend United	2001–02	Third Division	45	4	4	0	1	0	1 (Note: Appearance(s) in Football League Trophy)	0	51	4
Southend United	2002–03	Third Division	46	6	4	1	1	0	1	0	52	7
Southend United	2003–04	Third Division	46	1	5	0	1	0	6	0	58	1
Southend United	Total		137	11	13	1	3	0	8	0	161	12
Hull City	2004–05	League One	44	6	3	0	1	0	0	0	48	6
Hull City	2005–06	Championship	42	4	1	0	0	0	—		43	4
Hull City	Total		86	10	4	0	1	0	0	0	91	10
Crystal Palace	2006–07	Championship	37	7	1	0	0	0	—		38	7
Crystal Palace	2007–08	Championship	12	0	0	0	0	0	0	0	12	0
Crystal Palace	Total		49	7	1	0	0	0	0	0	50	7
Stoke City	2007–08	Championship	33	8	2	0	0	0	—		35	8
Stoke City	2008–09	Premier League	11	0	0	0	3	0	—		14	0
Stoke City	2009–10	Premier League	0	0	1	0	3	0	—		4	0
Stoke City	Total		44	8	3	0	6	0	—		53	8
Burnley	2009–10	Premier League	15	0	0	0	0	0	—		15	0
Burnley	2010–11	Championship	4	0	0	0	1	0	—		5	0
Burnley	2011–12	Championship	0	0	0	0	0	0	—		0	0
Burnley	Total		19	0	0	0	1	0	0	0	20	0
Preston North End (loan)	2010–11	Championship	13	0	0	0	0	0	—		13	0
Charlton Athletic	2011–12	League One	15	0	1	0	1	0	0	0	17	0
Charlton Athletic	2012–13	Championship	30	2	0	0	1	0	—		31	2
Charlton Athletic	2013–14	Championship	3	0	0	0	2	0	—		5	0
Charlton Athletic	Total		48	2	1	0	4	0	0	0	53	2
Career total			417	38	22	1	15	0	8	0	462	39

=== International ===
National team	Year	Apps	Goals
Guyana	2012	4	1
Guyana	2013	2	0
Total		6	1

== Honours ==
Southend United

- Football League Trophy runner-up: 2003–04

Hull City

- Football League One second-place promotion: 2004–05

Stoke City

- Football League Championship second-place promotion: 2007–08

Charlton Athletic

- Football League One: 2011–12
