= Ben Burgess =

English-born Irish footballer

Personal information
- Full name: Benjamin Kieron Burgess
- Date of birth: 9 November 1981 (age 45)
- Place of birth: Buxton, England
- Height: 6 ft 3 in (1.91 m)
- Position: Forward

Youth career
- Oldham Athletic
- Stoke City
- Everton
- Blackburn Rovers

Senior career*
Years	Team	Apps	(Gls)
1998–2002	Blackburn Rovers	2	(0)
2000–2001	→ Northern Spirit (loan)	27	(16)
2001–2002	→ Brentford (loan)	43	(17)
2002–2003	Stockport County	19	(4)
2003	→ Oldham Athletic (loan)	7	(0)
2003–2006	Hull City	70	(24)
2006–2010	Blackpool	126	(23)
2010–2012	Notts County	45	(5)
2012	→ Cheltenham Town (loan)	7	(2)
2012	Tranmere Rovers	0	(0)
Total		346	(91)

International career
1999–2000	Republic of Ireland U18	4	(1)
2001–2002	Republic of Ireland U21	4	(1)
- * Club domestic league appearances and goals

Benjamin Kieron Burgess (born 9 November 1981) is an English-born Irish retired footballer best known for his time playing for Hull City and Blackpool. He was capped by the Republic of Ireland at U18 and U21 level.

== Club career ==
=== Early career ===
Burgess began his career with spells as a youth at Oldham Athletic, Stoke City, Everton and joined Blackburn Rovers at age 16, where he stayed until 2002, but made just two league appearances for the club. On 3 October 2000 he went on loan to North Sydney based Northern Spirit in Australia. He scored 16 goals in 27 appearances for the club. In the 2001–02 season he went on loan to Brentford, before moving to Stockport County on 16 July 2002. He had a two-month loan spell at Oldham Athletic from January to March 2003, before signing for Hull City on 27 March.

=== Hull City ===
Burgess became the first Hull City player to score a hat-trick at the KC Stadium on 26 April 2003, in a match against Kidderminster Harriers. He was City's top scorer in their 2003–04 promotion campaign, scoring 18 goals and forming a partnership with Danny Allsopp. However, he suffered a serious cruciate ligament injury late in the season in a match against Huddersfield Town and did not appear in Hull's 2004–05 League One campaign until promotion had already been secured, showing sportsmanship by declining to accept any promotion award.

He soon returned to scoring despite playing two levels higher in the Championship, scoring one of two goals in the Tigers' first win of the 2005–06 season at home against Brighton & Hove Albion.

=== Blackpool ===
Burgess joined Blackpool on 31 August 2006, for an initial fee of £25,000, with a further £75,000 paid after he had played 30 games. On 31 October 2006, he scored his first goals for Blackpool when he bagged a brace in a 4–4 draw with Accrington Stanley in the League Trophy. On 27 May 2007, Burgess was an unused substitute in Blackpool's League One play-off final victory over Yeovil Town at Wembley. On 14 August 2007, Burgess, on as a second-half substitute, scored the only goal of the game as Blackpool beat Huddersfield Town in the first round of the League Cup. On 7 May 2008 Blackpool activated an option to extend his contract with the club by one year. On 27 March 2009 Burgess signed a new twelve-month contract with the Seasiders with an option for a further year.

Burgess started the 2009–10 season by scoring in the Seasiders opening day 1–1 draw with Queens Park Rangers at Loftus Road on 8 August 2009. His 100th league appearance for the club was as a 61st-minute substitute in a goalless draw with Swansea City at the Liberty Stadium on 24 October. He gained his fourth promotion and second with Blackpool in the Championship play-off Final at Wembley on 22 May 2010.

=== Notts County ===
On 2 August 2010 Notts County confirmed the signing of Burgess from Blackpool on a free transfer. In May 2012 he was released by Notts County, along with 12 other players.

=== Cheltenham Town ===
On 22 March 2012 it was confirmed that Burgess would join Cheltenham Town on loan until the end of the season, scoring the second goal of Cheltenham's play-off semi-final first leg at Whaddon Road against Torquay United with a header from "a full 18 yards".

=== Tranmere Rovers ===
On 1 June 2012 it was confirmed that Burgess had joined League One outfit Tranmere Rovers on a two-year deal after turning down a contract offer from Cheltenham Town due to the club having failed to gain promotion from League Two. After just under two months at Tranmere, Burgess decided to leave the club and retire from professional football. He stated that he felt he could no longer give 100% consistently and felt retirement was appropriate at that time. He went on to thank Tranmere for their continued support.

== International career ==
Although born in England, Burgess qualified to play for both England and Republic of Ireland. Burgess chose to represent Ireland and won caps for the U18 and U21 teams.

== Personal life ==
Burgess is a Manchester City supporter.

He studied for degree at Staffordshire University in Professional Sports Writing and Broadcasting, gaining a First Class Honours degree in 2009 whilst still playing and completed a Postgraduate Certificate in Education to become a qualified teacher.

After the end of the 2007–08 season, he spent time at the Blackpool Gazette as a trainee journalist on work experience. In August 2012, after he had retired from playing football he started writing a weekly column about former club Blackpool for the newspaper. In his first column he revealed that he would be studying for a Postgraduate Certificate in Education at Edge Hill University, Ormskirk, with a view to becoming a primary school teacher. He also began working for BBC Radio Lancashire as a summariser for Blackpool home games. Burgess began working as a teacher in September 2013, but continues some of his media work. In 2026 Burgess is now a head teacher at a primary school.

== Career statistics ==
Appearances and goals by club, season and competition
Club	Season	League			National cup		League cup		Other		Total	
Club	Season	Division	Apps	Goals	Apps	Goals	Apps	Goals	Apps	Goals	Apps	Goals
Blackburn Rovers	1999–2000	First Division	2	0	0	0	0	0	—		2	0
Blackburn Rovers	2000–01	First Division	0	0	—		1	0	—		1	0
Blackburn Rovers	Total		2	0	0	0	1	0	0	0	3	0
Northern Spirit (loan)	2000–01	National Soccer League	27	16	—		—		—		27	16
Brentford (loan)	2001–02	Second Division	43	17	2	1	2	0	4 (Note: 3 appearances in Football League Second Division play-offs, 1 appearance in Football League Trophy)	0	51	18
Stockport County	2002–03	Second Division	19	4	2	2	1	0	2 (Note: Appearance(s) in Football League Trophy)	0	24	6
Oldham Athletic (loan)	2002–03	Second Division	7	0	—		—		—		7	0
Hull City	2002–03	Third Division	7	4	—		—		—		7	4
Hull City	2003–04	Third Division	44	18	1	0	1	0	0	0	46	18
Hull City	2004–05	League One	2	0	0	0	0	0	0	0	2	0
Hull City	2005–06	Championship	14	2	0	0	1	0	—		15	2
Hull City	2006–07	Championship	3	0	—		1	1	—		4	1
Hull City	Total		70	24	1	0	3	1	0	0	74	25
Blackpool	2006–07	League One	27	2	3	1	—		1	2	32	5
Blackpool	2007–08	Championship	35	9	1	0	1	1	—		37	10
Blackpool	2008–09	Championship	29	6	1	0	1	0	—		31	6
Blackpool	2009–10	Championship	31	6	0	0	2	2	3 (Note: Appearances in Football League Championship play-offs)	0	33	8
Blackpool	Total		126	23	5	1	4	3	4	2	133	29
Notts County	2010–11	League One	17	1	0	0	1	0	0	0	18	1
Notts County	2011–12	League One	28	4	3	0	0	0	0	0	31	4
Notts County	Total		45	5	3	0	1	0	0	0	49	5
Cheltenham Town (loan)	2011–12	League Two	7	2	—		—		3 (Note: Appearances in Football League Two play-offs)	1	10	3
Career total			346	91	13	4	12	4	13	3	384	102

== Honours ==
Blackpool

- Football League Championship play-offs: 2010
- Football League One play-offs: 2007

Individual

- National Soccer League U21 Player of the Year: 2000–01
