= Ian Ashbee =

English footballer (born 1976)

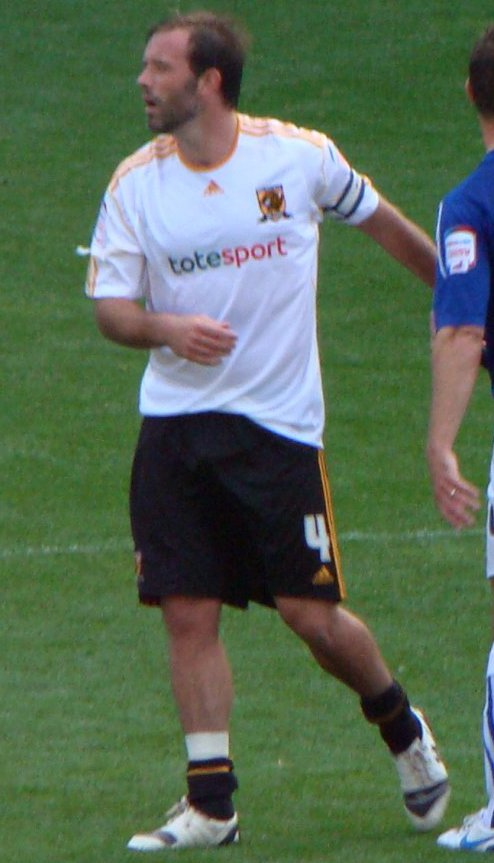
- Ashbee playing for Hull City in 2010

Personal information
- Full name: Ian Ashbee
- Date of birth: 6 September 1976 (age 50)
- Place of birth: Birmingham, England
- Height: 6 ft 1 in (1.85 m)
- Position: Midfielder

Team information
- Current team: Bridlington Town (assistant manager)

Youth career
- ?–1994: Derby County

Senior career*
Years	Team	Apps	(Gls)
1994–1996	Derby County	1	(0)
1996	→ ÍR (loan)	8	(3)
1996–2002	Cambridge United	204	(11)
2002–2011	Hull City	243	(10)
2011–2012	Preston North End	26	(0)
2015	Hull United	?	(?)
Total		482	(24)

International career
1995	England U18	1	(0)
- * Club domestic league appearances and goals as of 04:10, 27 December 2011 (UTC)

Ian Ashbee (born 6 September 1976) is an English former footballer who retired in 2012 having previously played for Preston North End, Derby County, Cambridge United and Hull City, and in Iceland, on loan to ÍR. He is Assistant Manager at Bridlington Town.

== Career ==
=== Derby County ===
Ashbee began his career at Derby County in 1994. He stayed at the Rams for two seasons, but struggled to make an impact and after a loan spell, he was eventually sold to Cambridge United in 1996.

=== Cambridge United ===
Ashbee was one of Cambridge United's longest-serving players at the time. He made his debut in a 1–0 win at Torquay. It was here that Ashbee made his name as he scored 11 goals in over 200 games for The U's.

=== Hull City ===
Purchased by manager Jan Mølby in June 2002 in the Third Division he suffered a nightmare start to his Hull career as he was sent off on his debut. This was, however, due to his no-nonsense approach on the pitch and he soon became a firm favourite with Tigers fans and management alike, with both Mølby and Peter Taylor making him captain.

The goal he scored against Yeovil Town was the goal that promoted Hull to League One and he was also instrumental in Hull's successful promotion campaign to the Football League Championship in the following season.

Ashbee was, however, cursed by an old injury in the subsequent Championship campaign, being diagnosed with an osteochondral defect, a degenerative bone condition in his femur. He underwent surgery that involved drilling fourteen holes in the bone to stimulate re-growth. He was warned by his doctor that this injury threatened not just his career, but his ability to even walk. Ashbee was on crutches for four months and was ruled out for the majority of the 2005–06 season, nevertheless he remained a favourite amongst many Tigers fans, receiving a standing ovation at the last game of the season against Watford despite being sidelined.

He was also retained as captain by Hull's next manager, Phil Parkinson, and his replacement, Phil Brown. But with a poor team performance in their second season in the Championship, finishing just one place outside the relegation zone, Ashbee as captain received a large share of fans' criticisms that were aimed at the team, despite the outgoing chairman Adam Pearson suggesting him as a potential Player of the Season.

The 2007–08 season saw vastly improved performances from the team as a whole, culminating in the club reaching its first ever Wembley Stadium final, taking on Bristol City for a place in the Premier League, a game which they won 1–0. This meant that Ashbee captained Hull to promotion from the bottom division of the Football League to the top. Andy Dawson, Boaz Myhill and Ryan France are the other players to have helped take Hull up through the four divisions. On 16 August 2008 Ashbee was captain of the Hull side that won its first ever top-flight game 2–1 against Fulham, completing an achievement thought to be unique in English football: captaining the same team in all four divisions of the Football League, bottom to top.

Towards the end of the 2008–09 season, in a fixture against Aston Villa on 4 May 2009, Ashbee suffered another career-threatening injury, rupturing a posterior cruciate ligament in his knee. It was initially thought that he would return to action in the Autumn, however on 18 August it was reported that Ashbee required further surgery on the knee and would likely miss the entire 2009–10 season.

Upon his return in the first game of the 2010–11 season, Ashbee scored the second goal in Hull's 2–0 victory over Swansea City.

=== Preston North End ===
In January 2011, Ashbee signed for Preston North End, managed by former Hull manager Phil Brown, after handing in a transfer request to then Hull City manager Nigel Pearson. Ashbee was offered a 1-year contract extension at Hull, but wanted to sign a 2-year contract, which Preston offered him. He went on to make 19 appearances for Preston during the season, but could not prevent his club from being relegated. Ashbee was named club captain of Preston in June 2011.

On 2 February 2012, Preston and Ashbee agreed to end his contract. During that season, at the age of 35, he had struggled through a knee injury that restricted him to only seven starts and four substitute appearances.

=== Retirement ===
Ashbee stated on his Twitter page later in 2012 that he had retired from professional football at the age of 36.

On 13 January 2015, he came out of retirement by signing for a short time with Humber Premier League side Hull United. He subsequently became chairman in June 2015, combining the role with his assistant manager duties. He left the club along with Curtis Woodhouse in 2016

== Later life ==
On 20 September 2016, Ashbee was announced as the assistant manager to Curtis Woodhouse at Bridlington Town.

In 2013 Ashbee began working for Blowers Jewellers as Director of Sports Clients.

== Personal life ==
Ashbee has a son, Stan, who is also a professional footballer. He currently plays for Ashbee's ex-side, Hull City.

== Honours ==
Cambridge United

- Football League Third Division runner-up: 1998–99
- Football League Trophy runner-up: 2001–02

Hull City

- Football League Championship play-offs: 2008
- Football League One runner-up: 2004–05
- Football League Third Division runner-up: 2003–04
