= Stuart Green =

English footballer

- Green playing for Workington in 2011

Personal information
- Full name: Stuart Green
- Date of birth: 15 June 1981 (age 45)
- Place of birth: Whitehaven, England
- Height: 5 ft 10 in (1.78 m)
- Position: Midfielder

Youth career
- Newcastle United

Senior career*
Years	Team	Apps	(Gls)
1999–2002	Newcastle United	0	(0)
2001–2002	→ Carlisle United (loan)	16	(3)
2002	→ Hull City (loan)	23	(6)
2002–2006	Hull City	123	(18)
2003	→ Carlisle United (loan)	10	(2)
2006–2008	Crystal Palace	24	(4)
2008–2009	Blackpool	6	(0)
2008	→ Crewe Alexandra (loan)	2	(0)
2009–2011	Wycombe Wanderers	15	(0)
2011–2012	Workington	20	(1)
2012–2013	Whitehaven	0	(0)
Total		239	(34)

Managerial career
- 2012–2013: Whitehaven
- * Club domestic league appearances and goals as of 14 July 2012

Stuart Green (born 15 June 1981) is an English former professional footballer and manager.

As a player he was a midfielder who came through the youth academy at Newcastle United before notably spending four years with Hull City. He also played professionally for Carlisle United, Crystal Palace, Blackpool, Crewe Alexandra and Wycombe Wanderers. He finished his career in non-league football with Workington before a spell with Whitehaven where he was a player-manager.

== Playing career ==
=== Newcastle United ===
An attacking midfielder who is often used on the right-hand side of midfield, Green started his career at Newcastle United but did not break into the first team. He played 16 games on loan at Carlisle United in the 2001–02 season.

=== Hull City ===
Later in 2002 he joined Hull City on loan, before then Hull manager, Peter Taylor, signed him on a three-and-a-half-year contract, in a £150,000 deal just before the club moved to the KC Stadium. Green scored in the first league game at the stadium on 26 December 2002, in a 2–0 victory over league-leaders Hartlepool United. Following a dip in form, Peter Taylor informed Green that he would be left out of the Hull team to face Lincoln City. When Green then attended a Carlisle United match rather than the Lincoln City match, Green was initially disciplined by the club, and then on 19 February he was sent on loan to Carlisle United until the end of the 2002–03 season with a view to a permanent move. Carlisle had to pay a non-returnable £30,000 fee.

Subsequently, he also fell out with Carlisle manager Roddy Collins, and before the club's match against Torquay United in April, Green was thrown off the Carlisle team coach by Collins who claimed that Green had been trying to negotiate a transfer back to Hull. Collins said, "How can you ask a man like that to run through a brick wall for you?" He subsequently returned to Hull and admitted that the move to Carlisle had been "a massive mistake".

=== Crystal Palace ===
Green remained a first-team squad member at Hull and turned down a move to MK Dons in January 2006 to fight for a regular place in the Hull team. However, on 31 August 2006, he joined Peter Taylor at Crystal Palace in a £75,000 deal. By early October, Green's longest appearance for Crystal Palace came at an away match against Hull City when he came on as a half-time substitute. Green scored on his full debut for the club in a home match against Cardiff City on 14 October which they lost 2–1. He scored again on his next full match for the club, on 1 January 2007, against Norwich City However, he did not play many games after Peter Taylor was sacked as manager.

=== Blackpool ===
On 31 January 2008, transfer deadline day, he signed an 18-month contract with Blackpool. However, after making just six appearances, five of which were from the substitutes bench, and struggling to get in the Seasiders squad, Green was sent on loan to League One club Crewe Alexandra on 14 November 2008. He made his debut the following day in a 0–2 home defeat to Leyton Orient.

On 9 June 2009, Blackpool confirmed that Green had not been offered a new deal and that he was being released.

=== Wycombe Wanderers ===
On 15 July 2009, it was confirmed that Green would pen a two-year deal at recently promoted Wycombe Wanderers. This saw him play under Peter Taylor for the third time, however after Taylor was sacked, in October 2009 after a poor start to the 2009–2010 season, Green did not make another appearance.

=== Workington ===
On 11 May 2011, Green was released by Wycombe Wanderers and was made a free agent. He then signed a two-year contract with Conference North side Workington on 29 July 2011 after he moved home to his native north-west. Later the same day he scored on his Workington 'Reds' début against Cumbrian rivals Barrow in a 1–1 draw.

== Managerial career ==
On 29 June 2012, Green became player-manager of Northern League Division One side Whitehaven. After a good season which saw Whitehaven achieve their highest ever league finish in the Northern League Division Two and reached their first Cumberland Senior Cup final, Green decided to leave at the end of the 2012/13 season after one only one year with the West Cumbrian club.

== Honours ==
Carlisle United

- Football League Trophy runner-up: 2002–03
