= Stuart Elliott (footballer, born 1978) =

Irish association football player

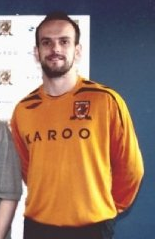
- Elliott wearing a Hull City kit in 2007

Personal information
- Full name: Stuart Elliott
- Date of birth: 23 July 1978 (age 48)
- Place of birth: Belfast, Northern Ireland
- Height: 5 ft 10 in (1.78 m)
- Position: Winger

Youth career
- St. Andrews (Northern Ireland)

Senior career*
Years	Team	Apps	(Gls)
1998–2000	Glentoran	162	(51)
2000–2002	Motherwell	70	(22)
2002–2008	Hull City	193	(65)
2008	→ Doncaster Rovers (loan)	10	(0)
2008–2010	Doncaster Rovers	9	(0)
2009	→ Grimsby Town (loan)	11	(2)
2010	Hamilton Academical	5	(0)
2010	→ Stirling Albion (loan)	7	(1)
2012–2013	Glentoran	4	(0)
Total		471	(141)

International career
2000–2007	Northern Ireland	39	(4)
- * Club domestic league appearances and goals

Stuart Elliott (born 23 July 1978) is a Northern Irish former professional footballer who played as a midfielder from 1998 to 2013.

Elliott made a name for himself whilst with Motherwell and Hull City as well as being capped 39 times by Northern Ireland. He also played professionally for Glentoran, Doncaster Rovers, Grimsby Town, Hamilton Academical and Stirling Albion. He had initially retired in 2010 but came out of retirement to return to Glentoran for the 2012–13 season.

== Club career ==
=== Glentoran ===
Born in Belfast, Elliott started his career at St Andrews FC, from Belfast, then moved on to Glentoran (also in Northern Ireland) before joining Scottish Premier League club Motherwell.

=== Motherwell ===
He became a fans favourite at Fir Park and his impressive performances earned him his first cap for Northern Ireland against Malta in September 2002. In May 2002, Motherwell went into administration and as a result had to sell many of their best players. During his time at the club, Elliott scored 22 goals in 77 appearances.

=== Hull City ===
Elliott joined Hull City for £230,000 and in his first season finished as the club's top scorer in 2002–03 with 12 goals. In 2003–04, he continued to impress and again hit double figures for his club. As Hull City clinched a place in The Championship in 2004–05, Elliott enjoyed a fantastic season netting 27 goals in the league (which earned him the golden boot, albeit shared with Dean Windass) as well as two in the cup, while also starring for Northern Ireland. This goal scoring tally is perhaps made all the more impressive given that Elliott does not play as a striker and was out for 6 weeks with an injury during mid-season.

Perhaps unsurprisingly, Elliott was unable to maintain this incredible goal scoring form in the Championship. In fact, he found himself in-and-out of the team, but despite this he still finished 2005–06 as Hull's top scorer with seven league goals. In 2006 it was revealed that he was suffering from a form of exercise-induced asthma, which affects his ability to perform for the full ninety minutes. In 2006–07 he was mainly used as an 'impact player' coming off the bench late in the game, such as in 13 January match against QPR when he came on with eleven minutes to go and scored twice to give the Tigers a 2–1 victory.

=== Doncaster Rovers ===
On 31 January 2008, Elliott signed for Doncaster Rovers on loan until the end of the season with a view to a permanent deal. Elliott had already snubbed moves to Southend United and Darlington, citing a desire to remain in the local area. He signed a two-year deal with Doncaster Rovers on 1 July. On 27 September 2008, Elliott became one of three men in the Rovers team to successfully hit the bar on the "Crossbar Challenge" on Soccer AM. On 8 January 2009 Elliott joined Grimsby Town on a one-month loan deal, this was extended for another month with Elliott eventually returning on 8 March.

=== Hamilton Academical ===
Elliott was released by Doncaster on 1 January 2010 and signed for Hamilton Academical two days later until the end of the season. He was then loaned to Stirling Albion two months later.

In August 2010, Elliott announced that he wished his contract cancelled to be able to concentrate on his faith, with a view to perhaps entering ministry.

=== Return to Glentoran ===
Elliott returned to former club Glentoran in September 2012. He made his first appearance since returning to the club on 1 October, coming off the bench as Glentoran lost 3–2 to Linfield in the County Antrim Shield. He made his first league appearance on 6 October, coming off the bench as Glentoran lost 2–0 to Crusaders. He scored his first (and indeed only) goal since his return to Glentoran in an IRN-BRU League Cup game against Institute. The goal was described as an "unstoppable 20 yard shot". Glentoran went on to win the game 4–2 on penalties after a 2–2 draw. After making only seven appearances and scoring one goal in all competitions, Elliott was released by Glentoran after the turn of the year.

== International career ==
Elliott earned 39 caps for Northern Ireland, scoring 4 goals including an impressive free kick against Azerbaijan. He played in Northern Ireland's famous victory over England but soon after began to struggle for his place in the team due to emerging young talents Sammy Clingan and Chris Brunt.

== Personal life ==
He is a born again Christian, belonging to Living Hope Christian Church in Hull, where he is a frequent speaker and pastor. There are only three churches of this denomination in the world; these being in Belfast, Motherwell and Kingston upon Hull, which by coincidence, correspond exactly to where he played the majority of his club football.

== Honours ==
Individual

- PFA Team of the Year: 2004–05 League One
- Inducted in to Hull City Hall of Fame
