= Ryan France =

English footballer

Personal information
- Date of birth: 13 December 1980 (age 45)
- Place of birth: Sheffield, England
- Positions: Right winger; right wing-back

Senior career*
Years	Team	Apps	(Gls)
1999–2003	Alfreton Town	199	(45)
2003–2009	Hull City	133	(6)
2009–2011	Sheffield United	9	(0)
Total		341	(51)
- * Club domestic league appearances and goals

Ryan France (born 13 December 1980) is an English former professional footballer He spent the majority of his career at Alfreton Town and Hull City, before ending his career at Sheffield United. His preferred position was as a right winger, but also played as a right wingback.

== Career ==
=== Alfreton Town ===
Born in Sheffield, France started his career at Alfreton Town. He had been courted by a number of league clubs but chose to remain with Alfreton until he had completed his degree at Nottingham Trent University where he graduated in Sport & Exercise Science and Mathematics. After an impressive start to the season, scoring five goals in seven games, he was signed for Hull City by then manager Peter Taylor in September 2003 for a fee of £15,000. Previously he had spent time on trial at Ipswich Town without being offered a contract.

=== Hull City ===
The day after signing for Hull, he scored on his début (as a substitute) in a 6–1 victory over Kidderminster Harriers. France achieved the impressive feat of four consecutive promotions: 2001–02 and 2002–03 in non-league football with Alfreton and 2003–04 and 2004–05 with Hull City in the Football League.

In the 2006–07 season, France's versatility was demonstrated as he played in a variety of positions for City, including left-wing, right-back and central midfield. However, in February 2007, in a game against West Brom, France ruptured a cruciate ligament in his left knee, ruling him out for the remainder of the season.

When France appeared for Hull City against Arsenal in the Premier League during the 2008–09 season, he joined an elite band of players to have represented the same football club in all four divisions. His second and final Premier League appearance came against Chelsea at Stamford Bridge. By June 2009 however France, along with eight other players, was told he was being released by the club after six seasons.

=== Sheffield United ===
Having been on trial at Sheffield Wednesday and even scoring in The Owls' pre-season victory over Hartlepool United, he joined cross town rivals Sheffield United on 24 July 2009, signing a two-year deal. He made his debut for The Blades in the first game of the new season; a 0–0 draw with Middlesbrough. France was unable to hold down a place in the first team, regularly featuring as an unused sub for the first half of the season. After making only nine league appearances for the Blades he picked up a knee injury in February 2010. The injury was only expected to keep him sidelined for six to eight weeks but he was never to play for the club again, failing to recover his fitness for the remainder of his contract. He revealed in a Hull City programme against West Ham United on 5 November 2011 that he had retired from the game due to a knee injury.
