= 2004–05 Football League One =

Football League One
- Season: 2004–05
- Champions: Luton Town (1st third tier title)
- Promoted: Luton Town; Hull City; Sheffield Wednesday
- Relegated: Peterborough United; Stockport County; Torquay United; Wrexham
- Matches: 552
- Goals: 1,550 (2.81 per match)
- Top goalscorer: Stuart Elliott; Dean Windass (27 goals)

The 2004–05 Football League One was the first season of the renamed Football League Second Division, the third tier of English football.

== Changes from last season ==
=== From League One ===
Promoted to Championship

- Plymouth Argyle
- Queens Park Rangers
- Brighton & Hove Albion

Relegated to League Two

- Grimsby Town
- Rushden & Diamonds
- Notts County
- Wycombe Wanderers

=== To League One ===
Relegated from Championship

- Walsall
- Bradford City
- Wimbledon (renamed Milton Keynes Dons)

Promoted from League Two

- Doncaster Rovers
- Hull City
- Torquay United
- Huddersfield Town

== League table ==
Pos	Team	Pld	W	D	L	GF	GA	GD	Pts	Promotion or relegation
1	Luton Town (C, P)	46	29	11	6	87	48	+39	98	Promotion to Football League Championship
2	Hull City (P)	46	26	8	12	80	53	+27	86	Promotion to Football League Championship
3	Tranmere Rovers	46	22	13	11	73	55	+18	79	Qualification for League One play-offs
4	Brentford	46	22	9	15	57	60	−3	75	Qualification for League One play-offs
5	Sheffield Wednesday (O, P)	46	19	15	12	77	59	+18	72	Qualification for League One play-offs
6	Hartlepool United	46	21	8	17	76	66	+10	71	Qualification for League One play-offs
7	Bristol City	46	18	16	12	74	57	+17	70	
8	Bournemouth	46	20	10	16	77	64	+13	70	
9	Huddersfield Town	46	20	10	16	74	65	+9	70	
10	Doncaster Rovers	46	16	18	12	65	60	+5	66	
11	Bradford City	46	17	14	15	64	62	+2	65	
12	Swindon Town	46	17	12	17	66	68	−2	63	
13	Barnsley	46	14	19	13	69	64	+5	61	
14	Walsall	46	16	12	18	65	69	−4	60	
15	Colchester United	46	14	17	15	60	50	+10	59	
16	Blackpool	46	15	12	19	54	59	−5	57	
17	Chesterfield	46	14	15	17	55	62	−7	57	
18	Port Vale	46	17	5	24	49	59	−10	56	
19	Oldham Athletic	46	14	10	22	60	73	−13	52	
20	Milton Keynes Dons	46	12	15	19	54	68	−14	51	
21	Torquay United (R)	46	12	15	19	55	79	−24	51	Relegation to Football League Two
22	Wrexham (R)	46	13	14	19	62	80	−18	43 (Note: Wrexham deducted 10 points for entering administration.)	Relegation to Football League Two
23	Peterborough United (R)	46	9	12	25	49	73	−24	39	Relegation to Football League Two
24	Stockport County (R)	46	6	8	32	49	98	−49	26	Relegation to Football League Two

Updated to match(es) played on May 2005. Source: Soccerbase
Rules for classification: 1) points; 2) goal difference; 3) number of goals scored.
(C) Champions; (O) Play-off winners; (P) Promoted; (R) Relegated

== Play-offs ==
=== Semi-finals ===
First leg

12 May 2005
19:45

Sheffield Wednesday	1–0	Brentford
McGovern 12'	Report

Hillsborough, Sheffield
Attendance: 28,625
Referee: Mike Jones
13 May 2005
19:45

Hartlepool United	2–0	Tranmere Rovers
Boyd 32', 68'	Report

Victoria Park, Hartlepool
Attendance: 6,604
Referee: Brian Curson

Second leg

16 May 2005
19:45

Brentford	1–2	Sheffield Wednesday
Frampton 87'	Report	Peacock 27'; Brunt 53'

Griffin Park, Brentford
Attendance: 10,823
Referee: Tony Leake

Sheffield Wednesday won 3–1 on aggregate.

17 May 2005
19:45

Tranmere Rovers	2 – 0 (a.e.t.)	Hartlepool United
Taylor 70'; Beresford 87'	Report
Penalties
Taylor (penalty missed); Hall (penalty scored); Roberts (penalty scored); Hume (penalty scored); Dagnall (penalty scored); Beresford (penalty scored); Sharps (penalty missed)	5–6	(penalty scored) Strachan; (penalty missed) Tinkler; (penalty scored) Porter; (penalty scored) Robson; (penalty scored) Westwood; (penalty scored) Sweeney; (penalty scored) Humphreys

Prenton Park, Birkenhead
Attendance: 13,356
Referee: Martin Atkinson

Tranmere Rovers 2–2 Hartlepool United on aggregate. Hartlepool United won 6–5 on penalties.

=== Final ===
29 May 2005
15:00

Hartlepool United	2–4 (a.e.t.)	Sheffield Wednesday
Williams 47'; Daly 71'	Report	McGovern 45'; MacLean 82' (pen.); Whelan 94'; Talbot 120'

Millennium Stadium, Cardiff
Attendance: 59,808
Referee: Phil Crossley

== Top scorers ==
Rank	Player	Club	League
1	Dean Windass	Bradford City	27
=	Stuart Elliott	Hull City	27
3	Paweł Abbott	Huddersfield Town	26
4	Adam Boyd	Hartlepool United	24
=	Leroy Lita	Bristol City	24
6	Sam Parkin	Swindon Town	23
7	Steve Brooker	Bristol City	21
8	Steven MacLean	Sheffield Wednesday	19
=	James Hayter	Bournemouth	19
=	Luke Beckett	Oldham Athletic	19
