= History of Hull City A.F.C. =

History of an English football club

The history of Hull City Association Football Club from its inception in 1904 to the present day.

== Inception ==
Hull City A.F.C. were founded on 28 June 1904. For some years before these attempts were made to found a football club, but in a city dominated initially by rugby league with the likes of Hull F.C. and Hull Kingston Rovers this proved difficult.

The first season for Hull City consisted of friendly matches; because of the time of founding, City were unable to apply for membership to The Football League for the 1904–05 season. The early matches were played at The Boulevard, home of rugby league side Hull FC. On 1 September 1904, City's debut match took place against Notts County; with 6000 in attendance at the Boulevard, City notched up an impressive start holding the more experienced County to a 2–2 draw.

Hull's first taste of competitive football came in the FA Cup, but they were eliminated, after a replay, in the preliminary round against Stockton, the score was 7–4 on aggregate. After uneasy relationships with landlords, Hull City moved to Anlaby Road Cricket Ground.

== Football League ==
Finally, after playing 44 friendly fixtures the previous season, Hull City were entered into the Football League Second Division for the 1905–06 season. Other teams competing in the league that season included the likes of Manchester United and Chelsea, as well as Yorkshire rivals Leeds City, Bradford City and Barnsley. Indeed, it was Barnsley who they faced in their first game, beating them 4–1. Eventually, Hull would finish fifth.

The following season a new ground was built for Hull City across the road from the cricket ground. Still under the managership of Ambrose Langley, City continued to finish consistently in the top half of the table. They came agonisingly close to promotion in the 1909–10 season, recording what would be their highest ever finish in their history (a record which will be surpassed at the end of the 2008–09 Premier League season); Hull finishing third, level on points with second placed Oldham Athletic, they missed promotion on goal average by the slim margin of 0.29 of a goal.

Before the First World War, Hull reached the quarter-finals of the FA Cup in 1915, beating out West Bromwich Albion, Northampton Town and Southampton, before eventually going out to Bolton Wanderers in a 4–2 away defeat.

== Post-War ==
In cup competitions, the club's greatest achievement was in 1930, when they reached the FA Cup semi-final. The cup run saw Hull knocking out Leeds United and eventual Champions of the Second and Third Division; Blackpool and Plymouth Argyle respectively. They then knocked out Manchester City, to meet Newcastle United in the FA Cup quarter finals. The first leg at St James' Park finished as a 1–1 draw, but in the replay Hull beat Newcastle 1–0.

The semi-final match against Arsenal took place at Elland Road in Leeds, the game ended 2–2, and was taken to a replay. Arsenal knocked Hull City out at Aston Villa's home ground, the game ended 1–0.

In 1948–49, managed by former England international Raich Carter, Hull City won the Third Division (North), and their new Boothferry Park ground saw a crowd approaching 50,000 for the Christmas Day game against Rotherham United, and exceeding that for the FA Cup 6th round tie with Manchester United; the attendance of 55,019 still remains a record today.

Yo-yoing between the second and third tiers of English football, Hull City had promotion seasons from the third to the second division again in 1959 and 1966, winning the third division championship in that latter season. Still, however, top flight football eluded the club. They came close several times in the early 1970s under the player-management of Terry Neill, but were not able to secure promotion before Neill left to join Tottenham Hotspur in 1974. Another player-manager, John Kaye succeeded Neill, but the club's form slowly deteriorated over the following years, eventually culminating in a disastrous 1977–78 season that saw four men (Kaye, Bobby Collins, Wilf McGuinness, and Ken Houghton) take charge of the team on its way to being relegated in bottom place.

The following season saw Hull struggle for consistency, before recovering well in the second half of the season to finish a respectable 8th place. This form was not carried forward into the 1979–80 season, however, and manager Ken Houghton was sacked in December 1979 after a two-month winless run left them near the bottom of the table. Wales manager Mike Smith was recruited to take over, and a strong end to the season saw Hull avoid relegation by a single point. This just staved off the inevitable, however, and a thoroughly disastrous 1980–81 season saw the club finish bottom again, resulting in their first-ever relegation to the fourth tier. Two relegations in three years had a dire effect on the club's finances, which in turn helped lead to a dismal start to their first season in Division Four. An upturn in form later in the season saw them finish in 8th place, but it wasn't enough to save Smith's job, and he was made redundant two months before the season ended.

The low ebb saw the arrival of unlikely looking saviours in the form of a chairman (Don Robinson) and manager (Colin Appleton) from the footballing outpost of Scarborough F.C. Promotion to Division Three followed in 1983, with a young team featuring the likes of future England international Brian Marwood, future England manager Steve McClaren, fearsome centre-forward Billy Whitehurst, and the prolific goal-scorer Les Mutrie. When Hull City missed out on promotion by 1 goal the following season, Appleton left to manage Swansea City.

Hull City reached the Second Division in 1985 under new player-manager Brian Horton, and again nearly earned a second successive promotion, this time finishing in 6th place. The two following seasons saw Hull only able to record mid-table finishes, however, and Horton was controversially sacked shortly before the end of the 1987–88 season. Former Leeds United manager Eddie Gray replaced Horton, but was himself sacked at the end of the following season, following a disastrous run that saw them win only one of their last twenty games.

1989-90 proved another very inconsistent season, with Colin Appleton returning for a second stint as manager, only to resign after just five months, following the club's worst-ever start to a league campaign. Stan Ternent took over from Appleton, and oversaw a remarkable upswing in form that saw the team manage a respectable 14th-place finish. This proved a false dawn, however, and Hull's start to the 1990–91 season was almost as bad as the previous one, including a humiliating 7-0 thrashing by West Ham. Ternent was sacked shortly after the turn of the year with the club well adrift at the bottom of the table, with Terry Dolan replacing him. Despite an initial upturn in form after Dolan's appointment, and there being only two relegation spots that year due to league restructuring, it proved too little, too late, and Hull were relegated back to the Third Division, the beginning of what would prove a 14-year absence from the second tier.

== Striving to survive: 1990s ==
Hull finished 14th in the Third Division in 1991–92, meaning that they would be competing in the new Football League Division Two. In their first season in the rebranded division, Hull narrowly avoided another relegation but the board kept faith in Dolan and over the next two seasons they achieved secure mid table finishes. But terrible form in 1995–96 condemned Hull to relegation to Division Three.

Dolan was fired by new chairman David Lloyd after Hull failed to get anywhere near the top of Division Three in 1996–97, with former England international Mark Hateley taking over the manager's job. By this stage, financial problems were taking their toll on the Tigers and it was starting to look as though the club would go out of business before long. And Hull's league form was steadily deteriorating to the point that relegation to the Conference was looking a real possibility – which surely would have meant the death of the club. The 1997–98 season would prove to be arguably the worst in the club's history, with the club earning just 41 points; any other season this would almost certainly have seen Hull relegated to the Football Conference, but Brighton and Hove Albion and Doncaster Rovers both had unbelievably poor campaigns, and instead it was Doncaster who were relegated, with Hull recording their lowest ever finish in 22nd place. Lloyd stepped down as chairman that summer and was replaced by Nick Buchanan, while Hateley departed in November 1998 to be replaced by 34-year-old veteran player Warren Joyce, who steered the club to safety after being anchored to the foot of the table – Hull City fans refer to this season as "The Great Escape". After this feat, Joyce was perhaps unlucky to be replaced in April 2000 by the experienced Brian Little.

Little breathed new life into Hull and managed to get good results out of the players, despite briefly being locked out of Boothferry Park by the bailiffs and with liquidation looking a real possibility. Hull qualified for the Division Three playoffs in 2000–01, and lost in the semi-finals. But things could have been much worse – at least the Hull City fans still had a football club to support. A boardroom takeover had eased the club's precarious financial situation and all fears of closure were banished – had the club been relegated to the Conference the previous season, it is extremely unlikely that this takeover would have taken place.

=== The Tigers on their way up ===
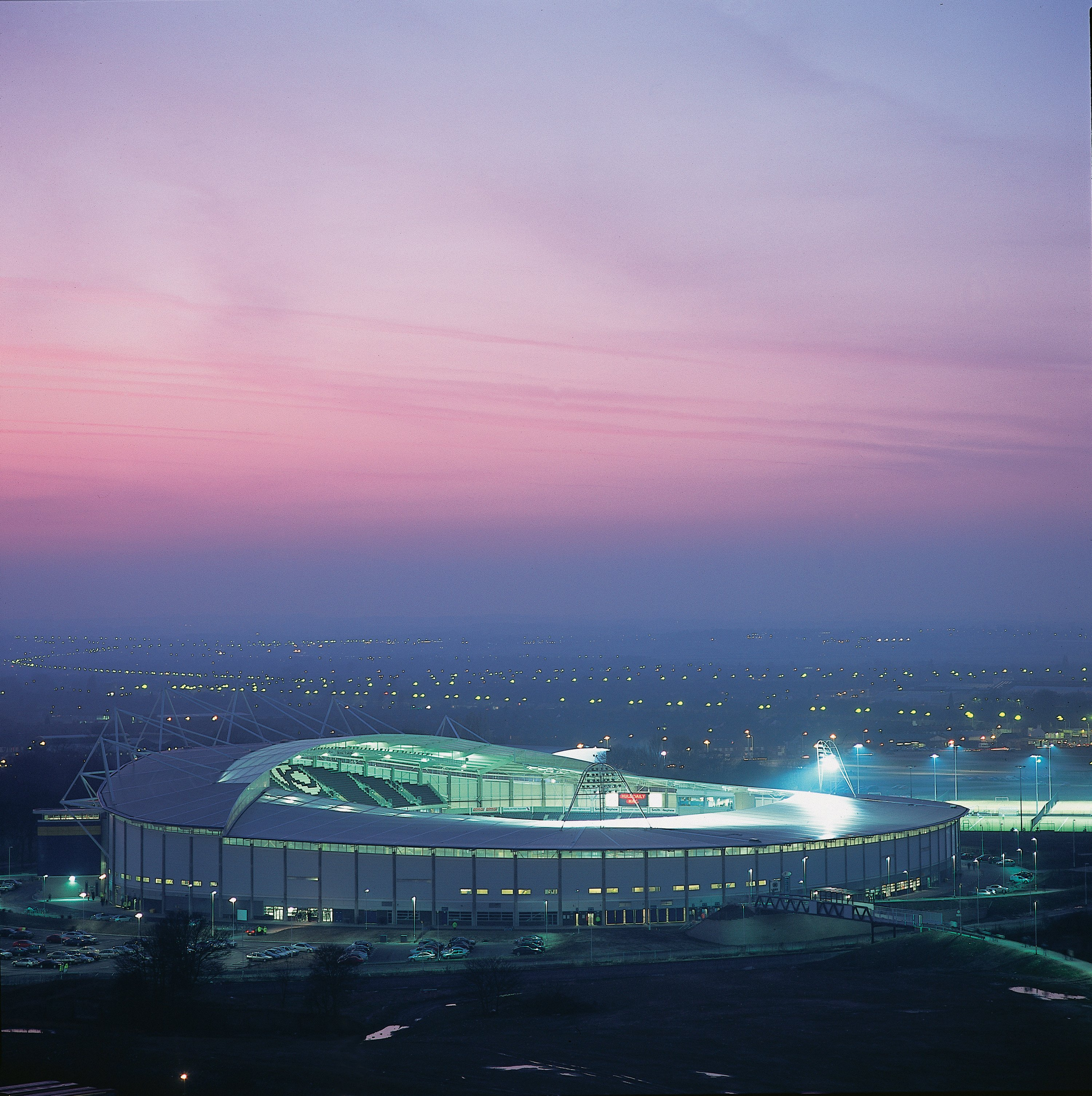
Kingston Communications Stadium.

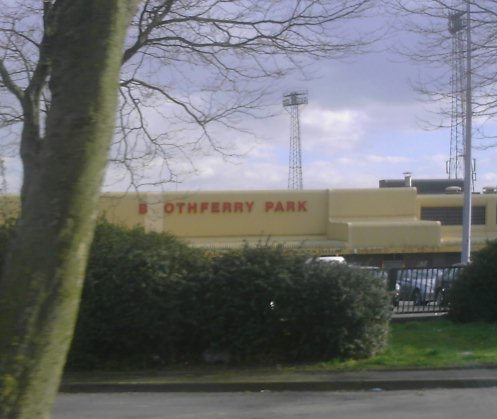
Recent picture of Boothferry Park

New Chairman Adam Pearson ploughed funds into the club, allowing Little to rebuild the team with the aim of immediate promotion. Hull occupied the Division Three promotion and playoff places for much of the 2001–02 season, but Little was sacked two months before the end of the season and Hull slipped to 11th under his successor Jan Mølby.

Hull began the 2002–03 season as most people's favourites for promotion from Division Three, but a terrible start to the season saw relegation look more likely than promotion and Molby was sacked in October as the Tigers languished fifth from bottom in the league.

Peter Taylor was named as Hull's new manager and in December 2002, just weeks after his appointment, Hull relocated to the impressive new 25,400-seat Kingston Communications Stadium after 56 years at Boothferry Park. After this move, Hull's attendances were some of the best in the division but their results were rarely this impressive and they were unable to finish above 13th place in the final table.

Hull's new stadium was one of the most impressive stadiums outside the Premier League and it has helped influence an upturn in Hull's fortunes after a decade of misery. The two seasons which followed the opening of the new stadium were hugely successful. Hull were Division Three runners-up in 2003–04 and League One runners-up in 2004–05 – back-to-back promotions – which took them into the Championship, the second tier of English football.

2005–06 was hardly the most exciting season in the history of Hull City football club; it was more a season of consolidation after two successive promotions. Hull finished 18th in the final table – a comfortable 10 points clear of relegation and their highest league finish for 16 years.

== 2006 and onwards ==
=== Championship struggles ===
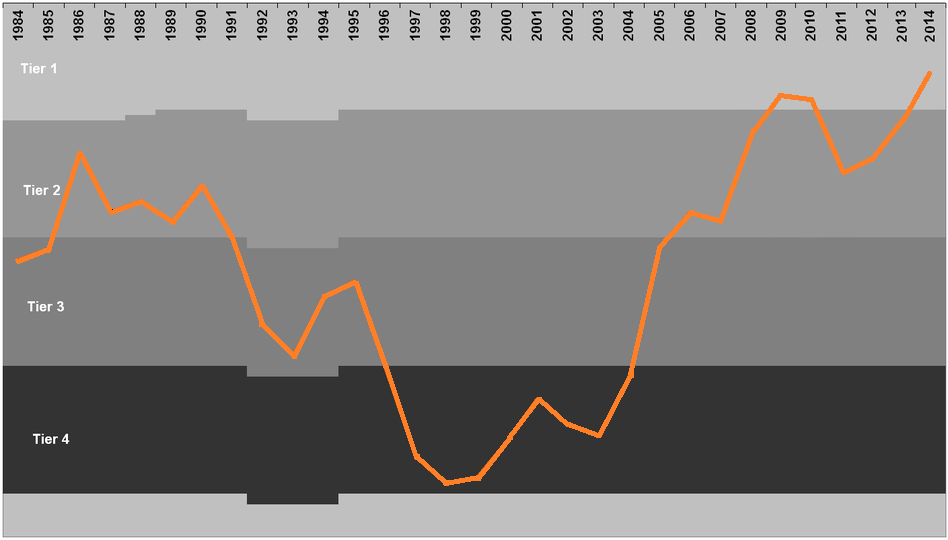
Graph showing Hull City A.F.C's progress through the English Football League System 1983–1984 to 2012–13 (last position shown: 9 May 2013, 2nd in the Football League Championship)

The successful stint at Hull City saw Peter Taylor's name linked with the Charlton Athletic manager's job before it was given to Iain Dowie. On 13 June 2006, Peter Taylor left Hull to take up the job vacated by Dowie at Crystal Palace, a club at which he had enjoyed considerable success as a player. Phil Parkinson was confirmed as his replacement on 29 June 2006, with Hull paying Colchester (with whom Parkinson was still under contract) £400,000 compensation. Phil Brown, who had recently departed his job as manager of Derby County, joined the club as Parkinson's assistant.

Defender Leon Cort became Hull's first million-pound player when he followed Peter Taylor to Crystal Palace for a fee of £1,250,000. Parkinson wasted no time in spending the majority of this money on strengthening the City squad in readiness for the 2006–07 season.

Chairman Adam Pearson has stated his ambition to take Hull into the top flight for the first time in their history – and he believed Phil Parkinson was the manager to do it. However, their dismal start to the 2006–07 season was hardly the form of a team attempting to gain promotion, and on 4 December 2006 Parkinson was sacked as manager with Hull in the relegation zone, despite having spent over £2 million on players. Parkinson had achieved two notable firsts, under his management Hull City won for the first time ever on live television and also won a penalty shoot-out for the first time.

Phil Brown was appointed as caretaker manager, and by 4 January 2007 Hull had moved out of the relegation zone and Brown was rewarded with a contract as their new manager until at least the end of the season.

Hull's Championship game against Sunderland AFC on 17 March 2007 at the Stadium of light saw an attendance of 38,448, a record to a Hull City game since they visited Stamford Bridge on 14 May 1977.

Hull City all but secured their place in the Championship next season with a 1–0 victory away at Cardiff City, on 28 April 2007. This left them 3 points clear of Leeds United, the only side with a chance of overtaking them, but with a vastly superior goal difference this was only a mathematical possibility. This crucial goal was scored by Dean Windass, who had rejoined his hometown club on loan from Bradford City.

By 4 May, due to a lack of any realistic chance of them remaining in the Championship, Leeds went into administration and in doing so received the 10-point penalty such a move incurs. This deduction left Leeds at the bottom of the championship on 36 points, securing Hull's place in the Championship for the 2007–08 season.

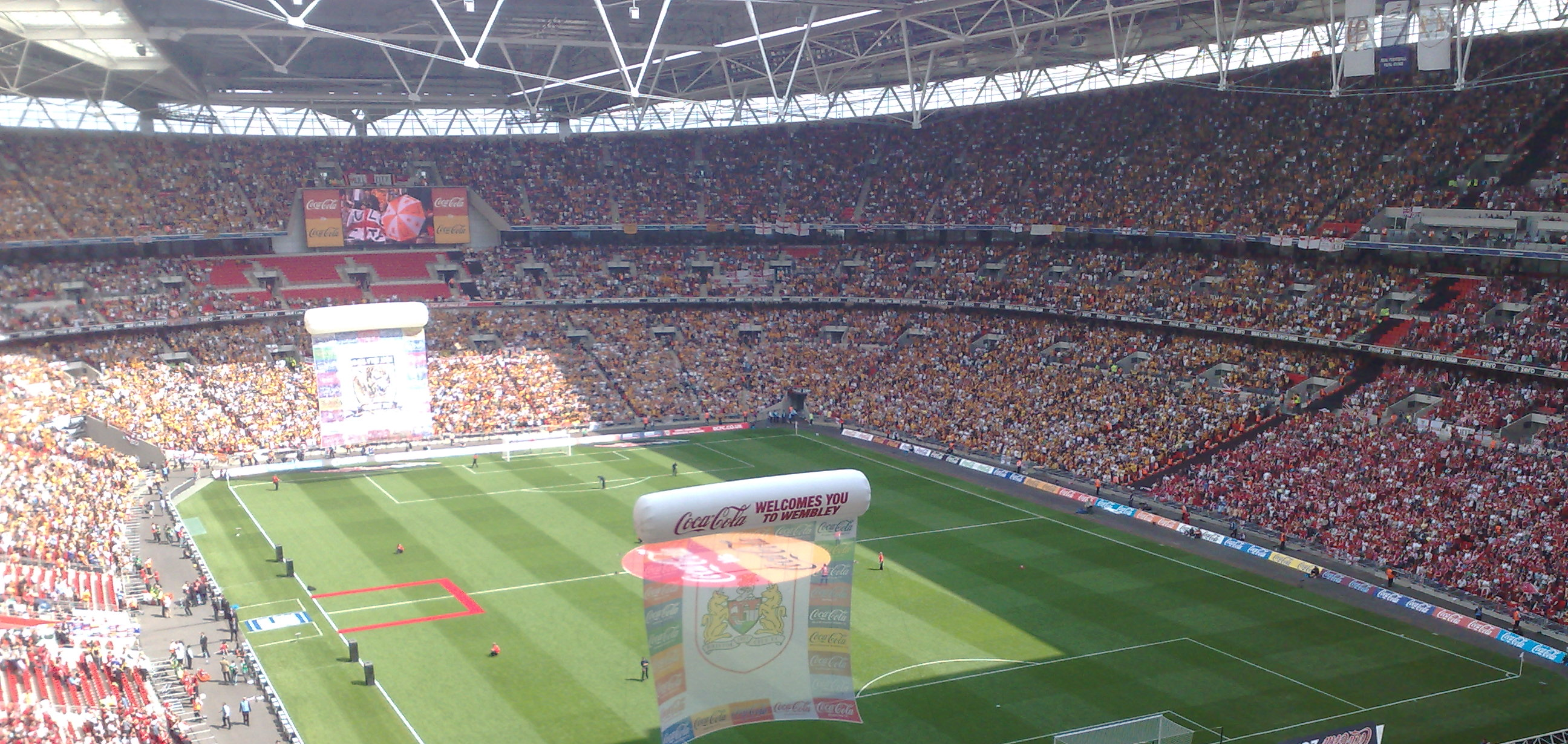
Wembley Stadium before the Championship play-off final against Bristol City

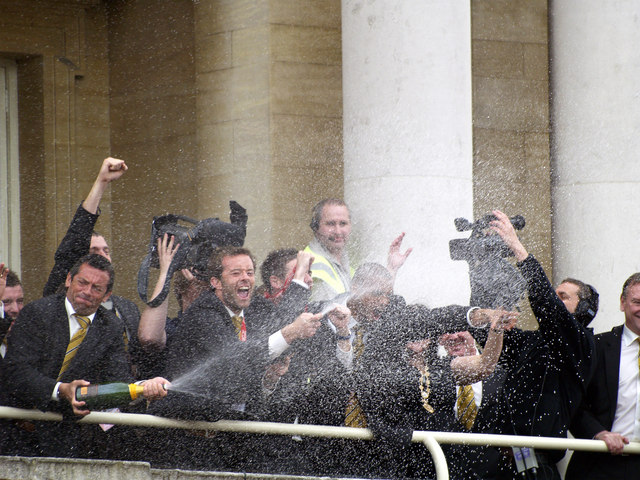
Phil Brown and players celebrate on promotion to the Premier League in 2008

=== Championship success ===
That summer saw Adam Pearson move on, declaring that he felt he had taken the club as far as he could and new investment would be required to progress further. He sold the club to a consortium headed by new Chairman Paul Duffen and severed his ties with the club, eventually taking over as Chairman of Derby County. Under Duffen and manager Phil Brown Hull City improved greatly on their relegation battle of 2006–07 and qualified for the play-offs after finishing the season in third place. They beat Watford 6–1 on aggregate in the semi-finals and played Bristol City in the final on 24 May 2008, which Hull won 1–0 at Wembley Stadium, with Hull native Dean Windass scoring the winning goal.

Their ascent from the bottom division of the English football league to the top in just five seasons is the third fastest ever.

=== Premier League football ===
The 2008–09 season saw the Tigers play in the Premier League with home games at the KC Stadium. Hull City sold out all 20,500 season tickets. Hull released four of their players: David Livermore, Jay-Jay Okocha, Frank Belt and Brewster Frizzell.

Despite being one of the favourites for relegation, they began life in the Premier League in great form, beating Fulham 2–1 on the opening day in their first ever top flight fixture. With only one defeat in their opening nine games, Hull City found themselves (temporarily) joint top of the table, third on goal difference, following a 3–0 victory over West Bromwich Albion – ten years previously they had been bottom of tier four of the league. Hull City's form never replicated the highs of the early autumn, winning only two more games over the remainder of the season. Despite the drop in form and slow slide down the table, Hull City went into the final game of the season in 17th place and above the drop zone. They ultimately lost the game against Manchester United 0–1, however Newcastle United and Middlesbrough also lost their games against Aston Villa and West Ham respectively, thus securing a second Premier League season for Hull City.

On 10 June 2009, Hull City were officially announced as part of the Barclays Asia Trophy 2009. In this 4-team tournament Hull City competed against two English sides, Tottenham Hotspur and West Ham United, as well local side Beijing Guoan, who they beat 5–4 on a penalty shoot out after a 1–1 draw. On 31 July 2009, Hull City faced Tottenham Hotspur in the final of the Barclays Asia Trophy and were defeated 3–0. On 6 August 2009, Hull City acquired American international striker Jozy Altidore on loan from Spanish side Villarreal, with an option to buy him after the 2009–10 season.

On 29 October 2009 chairman Paul Duffen resigned his position with the club and was replaced by former chairman Adam Pearson on 2 November 2009 and on 15 March 2010 manager Phil Brown was relieved of his duties after a run of four defeats left Hull in the relegation zone. Brown's replacement was former Crystal Palace and Charlton boss, Iain Dowie and the appointment was met with some disbelief by supporters who were hoping for a "bigger name" replacement. Dowie's first move as manager was to bring Tim Flowers and Steve Wigley onto his backroom staff, with former Hull City manager Brian Horton joining Phil Brown on gardening leave.

=== Return to the Football League ===
Hull City's relegation from the Premier League was confirmed on 3 May 2010, after a 2–2 draw at Wigan Athletic. On 3 June, season tickets for the club's 2010–11 season in the Football League Championship went on general release sale. After relegation, the club handed over their share on Friday, 4 June. Phil Brown's contract as manager was confirmed ended on 7 June 2010, and the search for his replacement was to continue past mid-June as the club confirmed that Iain Dowie would ultimately not be retained in a managerial capacity. Nigel Pearson was confirmed as the new manager on 29 June, lured from Leicester City in part by the Championship ambitions of the Tigers. Perceived lack of support at the Midlands club and permission to bring along staffers Craig Shakespeare and Steve Walsh from the Foxes helped seal the deal.

On 10 November 2010, it was announced that father and son Assem Allam and Ehab Allam were to take over Hull City in a deal worth £150 million.

=== Return to the Premier League under Steve Bruce ===
On Saturday 4 May 2013 it was confirmed Hull City would return to the Premier League after a dramatic 2–2 draw against Cardiff City on the final day of the season after fellow promotion challengers Watford lost 2–1 against Leeds United at home. In the 2013–14 season they achieved their highest ever league finish of 16th and were runners-up to Arsenal, losing 3–2 after extra-time, in their first ever FA Cup Final appearance. There were relegated from the Premier League on the final day of the 2014–15 season, but made an immediate return by beating Sheffield Wednesday in the 2016 Football League Championship play-off final at Wembley Stadium.

=== From Premier League to League One ===
On 22 July 2016, the BBC reported that manager Steve Bruce had resigned from his position. This was later confirmed by the club, which also announced that Mike Phelan would act as caretaker manager. On 13 October 2016, Phelan became Hull's permanent head coach. On 3 January 2017, head coach Phelan was sacked by Hull City, less than three months after being made permanent. The decision was made following a 3–1 away defeat to West Bromwich Albion the previous day, leaving the Tigers bottom of the Premier League and three points adrift of safety. On 5 January 2017, the club announced the appointment of Marco Silva as the new head coach until the end of the 2016–17 season. Hull were relegated back to the Championship on 14 May 2017, following their 4–0 away defeat to Crystal Palace. On 25 May 2017, following relegation from the Premier League manager Marco Silva resigned.

On 9 June 2017, the club announced the appointment of Leonid Slutsky as head coach. On 3 December 2017, Leonid Slutsky and Oleg Yarovinsky left the club by mutual consent after a run of bad results.

On 7 December 2017, Nigel Adkins was appointed as head coach on an 18-month contract and Andy Crosby was appointed as his assistant. He led the team to finish in 18th at the end of the season in the Football League Championship. The following season, despite being in the relegation zone after 19 games - an upturn in form saw the Tigers to finish in an impressive 13th place - helped on by star man Jarrod Bowen. However, Adkins resigned at the end of the season after rejecting a new contract.

On 21 June 2019, Grant McCann was appointed as head coach on a one-year rolling contract. The team made a promising start to the 2019–20 season and were in 8th place after the win at Sheffield Wednesday on New Years Day. But on the last day of the January transfer window they sold two of their best players – Jarrod Bowen and Kamil Grosicki. The team only managed one win, for the remainder of the season, on 2 July 2020 against Middlesbrough, and finished last in the division. They were relegated to EFL League One. On 24 April 2021, Hull were promoted back to the Championship at the first time of asking after a 2–1 victory away at Lincoln City. The following week, a 3–1 win at home to Wigan Athletic saw the Tigers crowned EFL League One Champions.

=== New ownership ===
On 19 January 2022, following months of negotiations and speculation, Turkish media mogul Acun Ilıcalı and his company Acun Medya, completed a takeover of the club, ending the club's controversial 11-year ownership under the Allam family. The club sat 19th in The Championship at the time that the takeover was announced. On 27 January 2022, Shota Arveladze was announced as the new head coach. Hull achieved Championship survival in the 2021–22 season with a 19th-place finish. On 30 September 2022, Arveladze was sacked after a run of four league defeats and Andy Dawson was appointed as interim head coach. On 3 November 2022, the club announced former player, Liam Rosenior, as head coach, on a two-and-a-half-year deal. Having strengthened both the team's defensive record and the team's away record since his arrival, Rosenior guided Hull to a 15th-placed finish at the end of the 2022–23 season. On 7 May 2024, after a seventh-place finish in the 2023–24 season caused the team to narrowly miss out on the play-offs, Rosenior was sacked. Hull City owner, Acun Ilicali said that Rosenior had been sacked over a difference on football philosophy between the two with Ilicali wanting attacking football and Rosenior unable to offer that as a manager.

With Rosenior sacked, much of the previous season's playing squad left. Among these, young talents Jacob Greaves and Jaden Philogene were now considered ready for the Premier League, and were soon bought by Ipswich Town and Aston Villa respectfully. Other notable losses were the end of loans for Fábio Carvalho, Liam Delap, and Tyler Morton, whilst cult hero Ozan Tufan returned to his native Turkey with Trabzonspor. Greg Docherty and Matt Ingram, both key members of the squad who won promotion from League One in 2021, also left.

During this period of transition, Tim Walter was appointed as Rosenior's replacement, beginning his new role on 1 July 2024. However, he was removed from his post on 27 November 2024, after enduring a league run of four straight defeats and nine games without a win. At the time, Hull were 22nd in the Championship, sat just inside the relegation zone. On 6 December 2024, Rubén Sellés was appointed as head coach of the club on a two-and-a-half-year deal, taking up his position from 9 December. Sellés was able to stave off relegation after a final day 1–1 draw away at Portsmouth, but it did not save his job. He was dismissed on 15 May 2025, before being replaced by Bosnian coach Sergej Jakirović on 11 June. In the 2025–26 season, Hull had been in a play-off slot for the majority of the season but dropped out of the play-off positions following a 2–1 loss to Charlton Athletic in the penultimate game of the season. A 2–1 win over high-flying Norwich City on the final day of the regular season coupled with Wrexham's 2–2 draw with Middlesbrough. gave them a 6th place finish. In the play-off semi-finals Hull faced a Millwall, the first leg was an uneventful stalemate, but a 0–2 win at The Den secured a place at Wembley. They were set to meet Southampton who beat Middlesbrough, the first leg finished 0–0, while the second leg ended 2–1 to Southampton and also 2–1 on aggregate, sending Southampton through to the final. But following the whole 'Spygate' scandal, Southamption were disqualified and Middlesbrough were reinstated into the final. Hull prevailed with a 95th minute Oli McBurnie winner and gained promotion to the Premier League.

Hull City started their campaign in the premier league with a shocking win over Manchester United followed by their unbeaten run by winning over newly promoted Coventry City and drawing with Aston Villa and Chelsea respectively.
