= Adam Pearson (sports executive) =

British sports executive

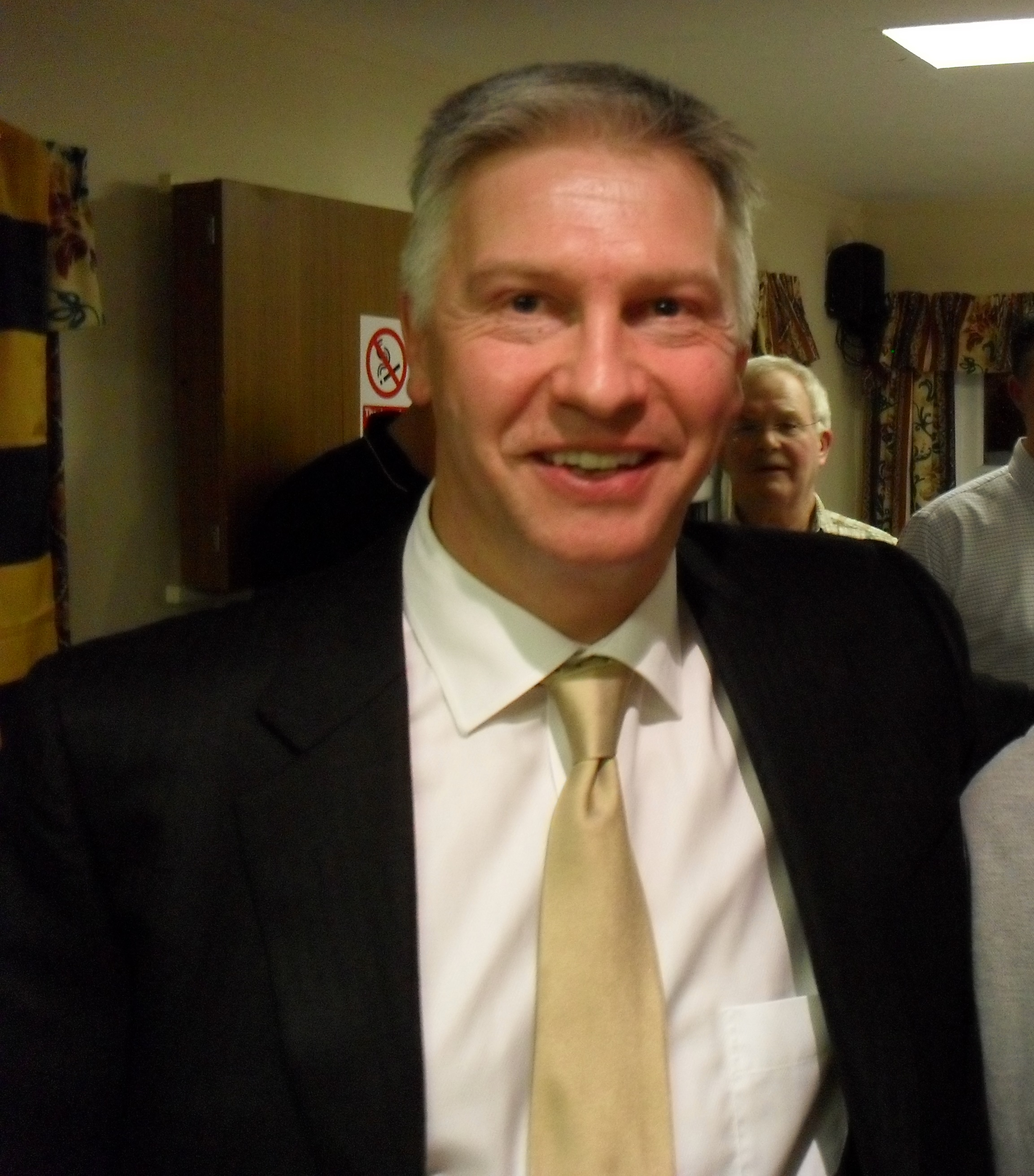
- Pearson in 2010
- Born: 19 November 1964 (age 61); Harrogate, Yorkshire, England

Chairman of Hull City A.F.C.
- In office 2001–2007
- Preceded by: Paul Duffen
- Succeeded by: Paul Duffen
- In office 2009 – 16 December 2010
- Preceded by: Paul Duffen
- Succeeded by: Assem Allam

Adam Pearson (born 19 November 1964) is the former owner of Hull F.C. rugby league club, and former Executive Director of Leeds United. He is the former chairman of English association football club Derby County, Chairman (2001–07 & 2009–10) and Head of Football Operations (2010–12) at Hull City and a former member of the Sheffield Wednesday footballing committee.

== Career ==
Born in Harrogate, Yorkshire, Pearson left his position as Leeds United's commercial director in 2001 to purchase Hull City and take over as chairman. At the time, Leeds were one of the country's most ambitious, big-spending Premier League clubs, while Hull were in administration and languishing at the bottom end of the Third Division of the Football League. But by the time Pearson left Hull in 2007, he had seen Hull promoted twice, moving up to the Championship.

Pearson was also Head of the Stadium Management Company, which operates the KCOM Stadium, the home of Hull City and rugby league side Hull F.C. But on 11 June 2007 at 12:00 midday, it was announced at a press conference broadcast live on BBC Radio Humberside that Pearson had sold the club and the SMC to a consortium consisting of Paul Duffen, Russell Bartlett and Martin Walker. It was confirmed that Paul Duffen would take over as Chairman, but Pearson would remain on the board of directors to provide continuity. However, on 31 July 2007 he resigned from the board, thus severing all ties with the club.

Pearson had been linked with an offer for Leeds, following the club being put up for sale. Though he did not make an offer, he indicated that he did want to own a football club again. In October 2007 he tabled a takeover offer worth more than £3 million for Huddersfield Town, the club he had supported all his life, but it was rejected.

On 29 October 2007 Pearson was named as the executive chairman of Derby County after buying the majority share holding from Peter Gadsby. On 28 October 2009 Pearson resigned with "mutual consent" as chairman of Derby. On 2 November 2009 it was announced by Hull that Pearson would be returning as chairman with immediate effect.

Following Hull City's relegation from the Premier League in May 2010, amid widespread speculation regarding the financial viability of the club, there was once again restructuring in the boardroom, with Adam Pearson stepping down from the role of Chairman to become Head of Football Operations, being succeeded as chairman by vice-chairman and club owner Russell Bartlett.

It was announced on 22 July 2011 that Pearson had purchased the full shareholding of Hull F.C. rugby league club for an undisclosed price.

On 1 May 2012, in a statement by Hull City owners Assem and Ehab Allam, it was confirmed that a consultancy agreement with Pearson had been terminated.

In April 2015 he joined Sheffield Wednesday, together with Glenn Roeder, to work alongside Stuart Gray.

In May 2015, he joined Leeds United as executive director to work alongside Massimo Cellino, only one month after joining Sheffield Wednesday. On 14 May 2015, Cellino carried out a press conference unveiling Pearson as the club's Executive Director to work directly alongside Cellino. The press conference included Cellino leaving halfway through for a cigarette break only to return, and for the press conference to run for over an hour. Cellino revealed that he would also sell the club if Leeds failed to gain promotion within the next two seasons.

Business positions
| Preceded by Nick Buchanan | Hull City A.F.C. chairman 2001–2007 | Succeeded by Paul Duffen |
| Preceded by Peter Gadsby | Derby County F.C. chairman 2007–2009 | Succeeded by Tom Glick |
| Preceded by Paul Duffen | Hull City A.F.C. chairman 2009–2010 | Succeeded by Russell Bartlett |
| Preceded by New Position | Hull City A.F.C. Head of Football Operations; 2010–2012 | Succeeded by Vacant |
