= 2010–11 Hull City A.F.C. season =

English football club season

Hull City
2010–11 season
- Chairman: Assem Allam
- Manager: Nigel Pearson
- Stadium: KC Stadium
- Championship: 11th
- FA Cup: 3rd round
- League Cup: 2nd round
- Top goalscorer: League: Fryatt (9); All: Fryatt (9)
- Highest home attendance: 24,110 (1 February vs Leeds United)
- Lowest home attendance: 19,714 (14 September vs Derby County)
- Average home league attendance: 21,168
Home colours	Away colours

The 2010–11 season is Hull City's first season back in the Championship after relegation from the Premier League in the 2009–10 season.

== Players ==
As of 30 June 2011

=== Current squad ===
Note: Flags indicate national team as defined under FIFA eligibility rules; some limited exceptions apply. Players may hold more than one non-FIFA nationality.

No.	Pos.	Nation	Player
3	DF	ENG	Andy Dawson
5	DF	IRL	Paul McShane
7	MF	AUS	Richard Garcia
8	MF	ENG	James Harper
11	MF	IRL	Kevin Kilbane
12	FW	ENG	Matty Fryatt
13	GK	ENG	Mark Oxley
14	MF	SCO	Tom Cairney
15	MF	NGR	Seyi Olofinjana
16	DF	ENG	James Chester
17	DF	SCO	Liam Cooper
18	MF	ENG	Nick Barmby
19	MF	ENG	Will Atkinson
20	MF	IRL	Jamie Devitt

No.	Pos.	Nation	Player
21	FW	ENG	Mark Cullen
22	MF	SLO	Robert Koren
23	FW	ENG	Jay Simpson
27	MF	ENG	Jimmy Bullard
28	MF	NIR	Corry Evans
30	DF	ENG	Liam Rosenior
31	MF	ENG	Gavan Holohan
32	MF	ENG	Cameron Stewart
33	FW	ENG	Aaron McLean
36	MF	ENG	Sonny Bradley
––	DF	NIR	Joe Dudgeon
––	FW	NGR	Dele Adebola
––	DF	ENG	Jack Hobbs

=== Transfers ===
This section only lists transfers and loans for the 2010–11 season, which began 1 July 2010. For transactions in May and June 2010, see transfers and loans for the 2009–10 season.

==== In ====
Date	Pos	Name	From	Fee	Notes
12 July 2010	MF	James Harper	Sheffield United	Free	
12 July 2010	MF	Nolberto Solano	Leicester City	Free	
13 August 2010	MF	Robert Koren	West Bromwich Albion	Free	
19 August 2010	FW	Jay Simpson	Arsenal	Undisclosed	
29 October 2010	DF	Liam Rosenior	Free agent	Free	(Note: Short term until 1 January 2011.)
30 December 2010	FW	Aaron McLean	Peterborough United	£1 million	
1 January 2011	FW	Matty Fryatt	Leicester City	£1.2 million	
7 January 2011	DF	James Chester	Manchester United	£300,000	
27 January 2011	MF	Tijani Belaid	Free agent	Free	(Note: Short term contract.)
27 January 2011	MF	Cameron Stewart	Manchester United	£300,000	(Note: Long term contract.)
8 May 2011	MF	Corry Evans	Manchester United	£500,000	
11 May 2011	DF	Joe Dudgeon	Manchester United	Undisclosed	
29 June 2011	FW	Dele Adebola	Free agent	Free	
30 June 2011	DF	Jack Hobbs	Leicester City	Undisclosed	

==== Out ====
Date	Pos	Name	To	Fee	Notes
5 July 2010	MF	Geovanni	San Jose Earthquakes	Free	
30 July 2010	GK	Boaz Myhill	West Bromwich Albion	£1.5 million	
18 August 2010	FW	Daniel Cousin	Larissa	Free	
4 January 2011	MF	Péter Halmosi		Mutual consent	
13 January 2011	MF	Nicky Featherstone		Released	
17 January 2011	DF	Kamil Zayatte		Mutual Consent	
31 January 2011	MF	Ian Ashbee	Preston North End	Undisclosed	
8 March 2011	DF	Steve Gardner	Harrogate Town	Undisclosed	
16 March 2011	FW	Caleb Folan	Colorado Rapids	Undisclosed	
10 May 2011	GK	Matt Duke		Released	
10 May 2011	DF	Anthony Gardner		Released	
10 May 2011	FW	Craig Fagan		Released	
10 May 2011	MF	Tijani Belaid		Released	
13 May 2011	MF	Nolberto Solano	Hartlepool United		

=== Loans ===
==== In ====
Date	Pos	Name	From	End date	Notes
5 August 2010	MF	John Bostock	Tottenham Hotspur	30 December 2010	
30 August 2010	DF	Anthony Gerrard	Cardiff City	30 June 2011	
11 September 2010	DF	Daniel Ayala	Liverpool	1 January 2011	
1 October 2010	FW	Rowan Vine	Queens Park Rangers	31 October 2010	
18 October 2010	GK	Vito Mannone	Arsenal	30 June 2011	
24 November 2010	MF	Cameron Stewart	Manchester United	31 January 2011	
31 December 2010	GK	Brad Guzan	Aston Villa	28 February 2011	
14 January 2011	MF	Corry Evans	Manchester United	30 June 2011	
15 February 2011	DF	Jack Hobbs	Leicester City	30 June 2011	
28 February 2011	FW	David Amoo	Liverpool	30 June 2011	
7 March 2011	GK	Brad Guzan	Aston Villa		
17 March 2011	MF	Hope Akpan	Everton	30 June 2011	

==== Out ====
Date	Pos	Name	To	End date	Notes
29 July 2010	MF	Kamel Ghilas	AC Arles-Avignon	29 May 2011	
10 August 2010	MF	Seyi Olofinjana	Cardiff City	30 June 2011	
30 August 2010	DF	Anthony Gardner	Crystal Palace	30 June 2011	
22 October 2010	DF	Steve Gardner	Harrogate Town		
4 November 2010	MF	Nicky Featherstone	Hereford United	January 2011	
25 November 2010	MF	Will Atkinson	Rotherham United	4 January 2011	
1 January 2011	MF	Kevin Kilbane	Huddersfield Town	30 June 2011	
6 January 2011	MF	Will Atkinson	Rotherham United	30 June 2011	
6 January 2011	FW	Mark Cullen	Bradford City	6 February 2011	
10 January 2011	DF	Liam Cooper	Carlisle United	10 February 2011	
27 January 2011	MF	Jimmy Bullard	Ipswich Town	30 June 2011	
16 February 2011	DF	Paul McShane	Barnsley	16 April 2011	
4 March 2011	DF	Liam Cooper	Carlisle United	4 April 2011	
4 March 2011	GK	Matt Duke	Derby County	31 March 2011	
2 April 2011	DF	Sonny Bradley	IK Frej	30 June 2011	

=== 2010–11 Squad statistics ===
Updated 7 May 2011.

No.	Pos.	Name	League		FA Cup		League Cup		Total		Discipline	
No.	Pos.	Name	Apps	Goals	Apps	Goals	Apps	Goals	Apps	Goals	Yellow card	Red card
1	GK	Matt Duke	20 (1)	0	1	0	1	0	22 (1)	0	0	0
2	DF	Kamil Zayatte	16	0	1	0	0	0	17	0	4	0
3	DF	Andy Dawson	45	0	1	0	0	0	46	0	11	0
4	MF	Ian Ashbee	19	1	1	0	0	0	20	1	5	0
4	DF	Jack Hobbs	9 (4)	0	0	0	0	0	9 (4)	0	1	0
5	DF	Paul McShane	13 (6)	0	0	0	1	0	14 (6)	0	1	0
6	DF	Anthony Gardner	2	0	0	0	0 (1)	0	2 (1)	0	0	0
7	MF	Richard Garcia	16 (9)	2	0	0	1	0	17 (9)	2	2	0
8	MF	James Harper	27 (1)	1	1	0	0	0	28 (1)	1	3	0
9	FW	Caleb Folan	2 (1)	0	0	0	0	0	2 (1)	0	0	0
10	FW	Craig Fagan	4 (1)	0	0	0	0	0	4 (1)	0	1	0
11	MF	Kevin Kilbane	11 (3)	1	0	0	1	0	12 (3)	1	3	0
12	MF	John Bostock	8 (3)	2	0	0	0	0	8 (3)	2	4	1
12	FW	Matty Fryatt	21 (1)	9	1	0	0	0	22 (1)	9	1	0
13	GK	Mark Oxley	0	0	0	0	0	0	0	0	0	0
14	MF	Tom Cairney	16 (6)	1	0	0	1	0	17 (6)	1	1	0
15	MF	Seyi Olofinjana	0	0	0	0	0	0	0	0	0	0
16	MF	Péter Halmosi	0	0	0	0	0	0	0	0	0	0
16	DF	James Chester	21	1	0	0	0	0	21	1	3	0
17	DF	Liam Cooper	2	0	0	0	1	0	3	0	1	0
18	MF	Nick Barmby	8 (23)	5	0 (1)	2	0 (1)	0	8 (25)	7	5	0
19	MF	Will Atkinson	3 (1)	0	0	0	0	0	3 (1)	0	0	0
20	MF	Jamie Devitt	7 (9)	0	0 (1)	0	1	0	8 (10)	0	1	0
21	FW	Mark Cullen	4 (13)	0	0	0	1	1	5 (13)	1	1	0
22	MF	Robert Koren	39 (1)	7	0 (1)	0	1	0	40 (2)	7	1	0
23	FW	Jay Simpson	19 (13)	6	1	0	1	0	21 (13)	6	0	0
24	MF	Nolberto Solano	6 (5)	0	1	0	1	0	8 ()	0	4	0
25	DF	Anthony Gerrard	41	5	1	0	0	0	42	5	8	0
26	DF	Daniel Ayala	12	1	0	0	0	0	12	1	6	0
26	FW	David Amoo	1 (6)	1	0	0	0	0	1 (6)	1	0	0
27	MF	Jimmy Bullard	5 (3)	2	1	0	0	0	6 (3)	2	0	0
28	FW	Rowan Vine	4 (1)	0	0	0	0	0	4 (1)	0	1	0
28	MF	Corry Evans	17 (1)	3	0	0	0	0	17 (1)	3	1	0
29	GK	Vito Mannone	10	0	0	0	0	0	10	0	0	0
30	DF	Liam Rosenior	26	0	0	0	0	0	26	0	3	1
32	MF	Cameron Stewart	14	0	1	0	0	0	15	0	1	0
33	MF	Aaron McLean	18 (5)	3	0	0	0	0	18 (5)	3	2	0
34	GK	Brad Guzan	16	0	0	0	0	0	16	0	1	0
37	MF	Tijani Belaid	3 (5)	0	0	0	0	0	3 (5)	0	1	0
39	MF	Hope Akpan	1 (1)	0	0	0	0	0	1 (1)	0	0	0
–	FW	Nicky Featherstone	0	0	0	0	0	0	0	0	0	0
–	DF	Steve Gardner	0	0	0	0	0	0	0	0	0	0

== Awards ==
Anthony Gerrard was named as player of the year. Liam Rosenior came second and Matty Fryatt came third.

John Bostock's goal against Swansea in the first match of the season being voted goal of the season.

== Preseason ==
=== Preseason friendlies ===
12 July 2010	Winterton Rangers	1–2	Hull City	Winterton
19:45 BST	Wilkin	Report	Emerton; Holohan	Stadium: West Street; Attendance: 815

14 July 2010 Billy Bly; Memorial; Trophy	North Ferriby United	0–6	Hull City	North Ferriby
19:45 BST		Report	Halmosi 20'; Cullen 36'; Cousin 46'; Atkinson 61'; Solano 65'; Emerton 71'	Stadium: Rapid Solicitors Stadium

17 July 2010	York City	0–1	Hull City	York
15:00 BST		Report	Cousin 80'	Stadium: Bootham Crescent

24 July 2010	Sunderland	4–2	Hull City	Albufeira
	Campbell 10', 23', 28', 34'	Report	Fagan 20' (pen.); Barmby 82'	Stadium: Estadio Municipal de Albufeira

31 July 2010	Hull City	2–1	Dundee United	Hull
15:00 BST	Cairney 10'; Zelmikas 50' (o.g.)	Report	Zelmikas 14'	Stadium: KC Stadium

== Championship ==
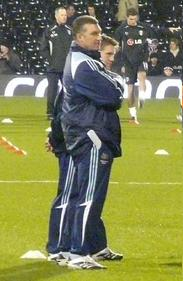
Manager Nigel Pearson

Hull City's return to the Championship after two seasons in the Premier League.

=== August–December ===
Pearson brought several transfers and loans into the club in his bid to strengthen the squad for the season's campaign. One of those efforts yielded quick results on the season's opening day, as loanee John Bostock from Tottenham Hotspur supplied the first of two winning goals over Swansea City. Team captain Ian Ashbee, returning from injury that kept him sidelined much of the preceding season, supplied the second.

After weeks of speculation about a local business man looking to be interested in investing in Hull City, it was confirmed on 18 October 2010 that Assem Allam, along with his son Ehab had entered negotiations with Hull City owner and chairman, Russell Bartlett. Allam confirmed at the time that he felt the need to pay back to the area, and that Hull City were important to the area. On 10 November 2010, it was confirmed by the Allams that a deal had been agreed for a controlling interesting in the club, and that the Allams would assume control once the relevant requirements had been met.

Whilst it was originally reported that Allam intended to only purchase a majority shareholding in the club, and would continue to work with Russell Bartlett, a protracted period of due diligence indicated that the investment required would be substantially higher than originally planned; this resulted in a move to completely seize control of the club. The deal was formally completed at 10.45 pm on 16 December 2010, with the club exchanging hands for the nominal fee of £1, but with Allam, and his son, Ehab committing to invest £30 million, as well as providing assurances for a further £10 million.

Following the takeover, it was confirmed on the official club website that Assem Allam would take up the roll of chairman at the club.

==== January–June ====
On Saturday 12 March 2011, Hull set a new record for the club, with 14 away matches unbeaten, breaking a record stretching back over 50 years.

=== Results ===
Date	Opponents	H / A	Result	Scorers (Note: Scorers for Hull City in bold)	Attendance	Notes
7 August	Swansea City	H	2–0	**Bostock** (23), **Ashbee** (50)	21,478
14 August	Millwall	A	4–0	Morison (14) & (52), Lisbie (29), Trotter (60)	13,292
21 August	Watford	H	0–0		20,426
28 August	Doncaster Rovers	A	3–1	Woods (2), **Barmby** (9), Sharp (44) pen., Coppinger (69)	11,149
11 September	Cardiff City	A	2–0	Olofinjana (20), Rae (81)	24,083
14 September	Derby County	H	2–0	**Ayala** (43), **Koren** (82)	19,714
18 September	Nottingham Forest	H	0–0		21,180
25 September	Norwich City	A	0–2	**Koren** (83), **Cairney** (88)	24,947
28 September	Burnley	A	4–0	Iwelumo (14) & (53), Eagles (24) & (50) pen	14,458
2 October	Coventry City	H	0–0		20,626
16 October	Leicester City	A	1–1	King (3), **Koren** (52)	23,766
19 October	Sheffield United	H	0–1	Yeates (53)	20,276
23 October	Portsmouth	H	1–2	Nugent (45+2), Halford (47), **Barmby** (62)	20,378
30 October	Barnsley	A	1–1	Hammill (24), **Kilbane** (72)	10,566
6 November	Scunthorpe United	H	0–1	O'Connor (89)	21,873
9 November	Leeds United	A	2–2	**Bostock** (14), Johnson (33), O'Brien (71), **Johnson** (82) og	24,906
13 November	Preston North End	A	0–2	**Garcia** (20), **Barmby** (72)	9,088
20 November	Ipswich Town	H	1–0	**Koren** (77)	20,535
27 November	Middlesbrough	A	2–2	**Koren** (20), Lita (29), **Gerrard** (41), McDonald (46)	15,075
11 December	Crystal Palace	A	0–0		13,341
18 December	Bristol City	H	2–0	**Simpson** (13) & (62)	20,299
26 December	Sheffield United	A	2–3	**Simpson** (3) & (45+2) pen, Evans (62) & (73), **Bullard** (90+3)	22,688
28 December	Reading	H	1–1	**Harper** (39), Church (82)	21,975
1 January	Leicester City	H	0–1	Vassell (11)	22,410
3 January	Portsmouth	A	2–3	**Bullard** (21) pen, Lawrence (57) pen, **Fryatt** (69), **Barmby** (72), Halford (76)	14,604
15 January	Barnsley	H	2–0	**Fryatt** (66) pen, **Koren** (90+3)	21,222
22 January	Reading	A	1–1	**Evans** (51), Harte (80) pen	16,494
29 January	Queens Park Rangers	H	0–0		20,601
1 February	Leeds United	H	2–2	**Fryatt** (33), **Chester** (40), Snodgrass (44), Somma (56)	24,110
5 February	Scunthorpe United	A	1–5	**Fryatt** (5), (73) pen & (89), **McLean** (50) & (81), Garner (55)	6,835
12 February	Preston North End	H	1–0	**Gerrard** (45)	21,566
19 February	Ipswich Town	A	1–1	Scotland (58), **Simpson** (85)	19,135
22 February	Derby County	A	0–1	**Gerrard** (71)	24,533
26 February	Cardiff City	H	0–2	Chopra (65), Emmanuel-Thomas (90+3)	21,441
5 March	Nottingham Forest	A	0–1	**Fryatt** (64)	25,119
8 March	Burnley	H	0–1	Delfouneso (5)	20,218
12 March	Coventry City	A	0–1	**McLean** (33)	14,370
19 March	Norwich City	H	1–1	Whitbread (27), **Barmby** (73)	22,967
2 April	Millwall	H	0–1	Morison	19,852
9 April	Watford	A	1–2	**Evans** (3), **Koren** (90), Taylor (90+2)	13,355
12 April	Swansea City	A	1–1	Gower (63), **Evans** (70)	14,822
16 April	Doncaster Rovers	H	3–1	**Garcia** (9), Moussa (16) **Fryatt** (21) pen & (50)	21,395
23 April	Middlesbrough	H	2–4	**Simpson** (3), McDonald (11), (13) & (45+3), Arca (26), **Gerrard** (69)	21,937
25 April	Queens Park Rangers	A	1–1	Routledge (9), **Amoo** (81)	17,399
30 April	Crystal Palace	H	1–1	**Gerrard** (31), Sekajja (88)	20,407
7 May	Bristol City	A	3–0	Stead (3), Pitman (14), Campbell-Ryce (56)	15,112

=== Results by round ===
Round	1	2	3	4	5	6	7	8	9	10	11	12	13	14	15	16	17	18	19	20	21	22	23	24	25	26	27	28	29	30	31	32	33	34	35	36	37	38	39	40	41	42	43	44	45	46
Ground	H	A	H	A	A	H	H	A	A	H	A	H	H	A	H	A	A	H	A	A	H	A	H	H	A	H	A	H	H	A	H	A	A	H	A	H	A	H	H	A	A	H	H	A	H	A
Result	W	L	D	L	L	W	D	W	L	D	D	L	L	D	L	D	W	W	D	D	W	W	D	L	W	W	D	D	D	W	W	D	W	L	W	L	W	D	L	W	D	W	L	D	D	L
Position	6	14	11	18	19	16	18	15	17	16	16	19	19	20	20	22	20	19	18	19	18	15	15	16	15	12	12	12	13	12	10	10	8	9	8	9	8	10	11	10	10	8	10	10	10	11

A = Away; H = Home; W = Win; D = Draw; L = Loss

=== League table ===
Pos	Team	Pld	W	D	L	GF	GA	GD	Pts
9	Millwall	46	18	13	15	62	48	+14	**67**
10	Leicester City	46	19	10	17	76	71	+5	**67**
**11**	Hull City	**46**	**16**	**17**	**13**	**52**	**51**	**+1**	**65**
12	Middlesbrough	46	17	11	18	68	68	0	**62**
13	Ipswich Town	46	18	8	20	62	68	−6	**62**

Updated to match(es) played on 7 May 2011. Source: The Football League
Rules for classification: 1) points; 2) goal difference; 3) number of goals scored.

== FA Cup ==
Hull City were drawn at home against Premier League club Wigan Athletic in the third round draw of the FA Cup that took place on 28 November 2010.

=== Results ===
Date	Opponents	H / A	Result	Scorers (Note: Scorers for Hull City in bold)	Attendance	Notes
8 January 2011	Wigan Athletic	H	2–3	Diamé (21) & (77), McManaman (56), **Barmby** (74) & (89)	10,433

== League Cup ==
Hull City received a bye in the first round of the League Cup drawn on 16 June 2010. For the second round, Hull City drew League One side Brentford for an away game played on 24 August, which they lost by a score of 2–1.

=== Results ===
Date	Opponents	H / A	Result	Scorers (Note: Scorers for Hull City in bold)	Attendance	Notes
24 August	Brentford	A	2–1	**Cullen** (6), Simpson (20), Bean (88)	3,335

== Kits ==
Hull City's kits for the 2010–11 season are manufactured by German sports apparel company Adidas. The away kit was revealed on 3 July 2010 to be all white with amber trim. The home kit, revealed on 10 July 2010, comprises:

- jersey with black and amber stripes on the front, solid amber on the back, and black trim on the shoulder
- black shorts and socks with amber trim

The sponsor for the front of the jerseys remained The Tote, its trademarks totesport.com printed on the front of the home jersey and totesport on the front of the away jersey. On 3 August 2010, the club announced two additional sponsorship agreements:

- the name of a local law firm will appear on the back of both the home and away jerseys
- the name and logo of a laboratory supply company will appear on the back of both the home and away shorts

Hull City's home kit for 2010–11.	Hull City's away kit for 2010–11.
