= Tan Kesler =

Turkish executive

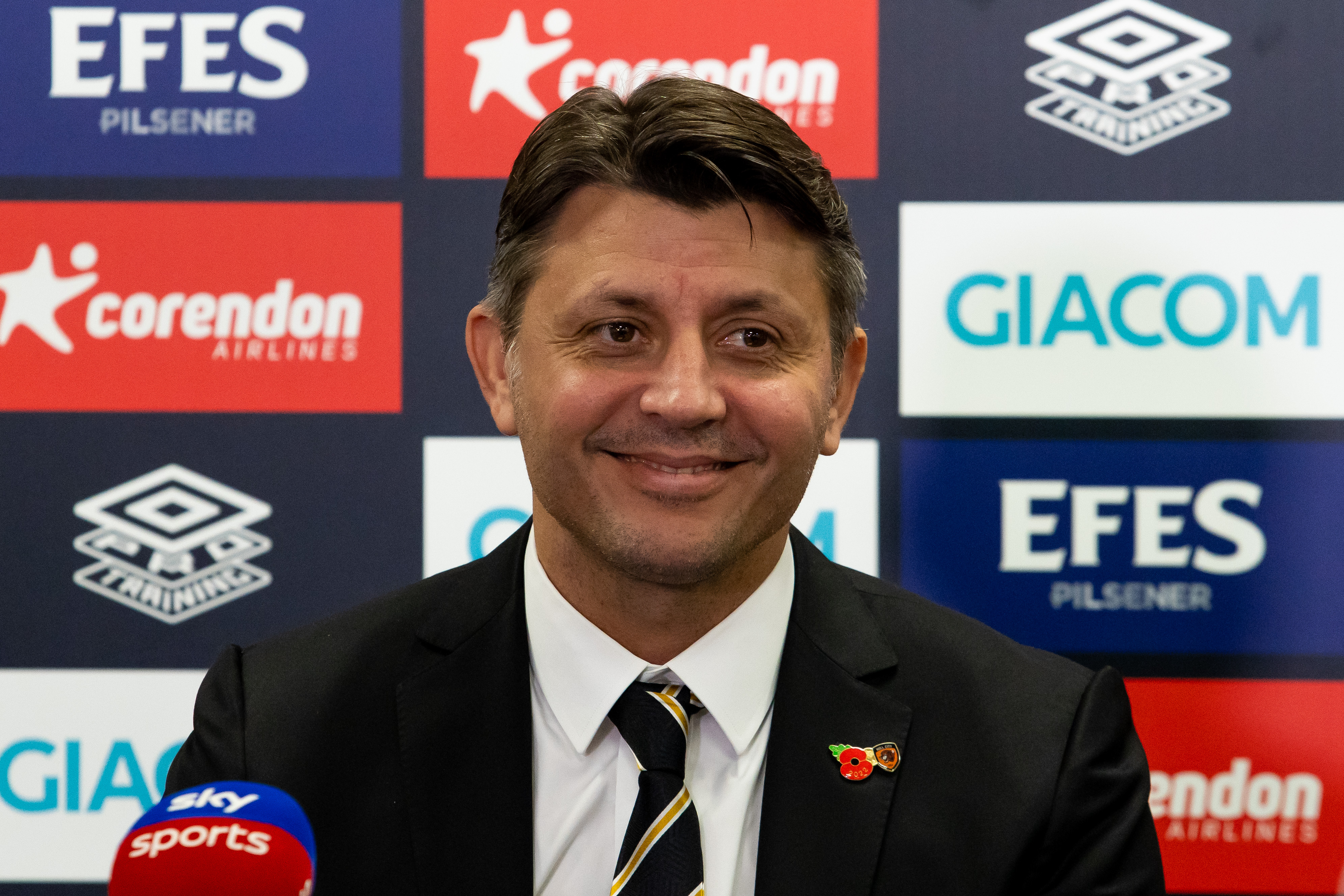
- Kesler with Hull City in 2022
- Born: Tan Kesler; 14 May 1979 (age 47); Adana, Turkey
- Education: Kean University; New York University
- Occupations: Businessman; football executive
- Height: 1.85 m (6 ft 1 in)
- Spouse: Ksenia Shamilova (m. 2019)
- Children: 1

Vice-chairman – Hull City
- In office 19 January 2022 – 17 October 2024
- Preceded by: Ehab Allam
- Succeeded by: TBA

Vice-chairman – Pogoń Szczecin
- Incumbent
- Assumed office 21 March 2025
- Preceded by: Karol Zaborowski

CEO – Pogoń Szczecin
- Incumbent
- Assumed office 17 March 2025

Tan Kesler (born 14 May 1979) is a Turkish businessman and football executive who is the current vice-chairman and CEO of Ekstraklasa club Pogoń Szczecin.

He previously worked as the vice-chairman of EFL Championship club Hull City.

== Early life ==
Kesler was born on 14 May 1979 in Adana, Turkey. He is the son of former Turkish international footballer and coach Şevket Kesler. He earned a BA in International Business and Finance at Kean University. During his time there, Kesler would feature for the university's basketball team. He would later earn an MA in Sports Business at New York University.

== Career ==
Kesler is a former FIFA-licensed agent and was the president of HTK Sports & Media from 2017 until 2022. He also previously worked for the Turkish Football Federation.

In January 2022, Kesler was an important figure in the acquisition of Hull City for businessman Acun Ilıcalı and his company Acun Medya. After the takeover was completed, he was appointed vice-chairman of the club by Ilıcalı. In order to dedicate himself to the role, Kesler waived all his other ongoing sports and media consultancy duties.

Kesler was also influential for Acun Medya in their acquisition of Shelbourne in July 2023, although their ownership of the Irish club would only last four months. On 7 June 2024, it was announced that Kesler had been admitted to the EFL Board as a representative of the EFL Championship. On 17 October 2024, Kesler left Hull by mutual consent.

On 17 March 2025, he was named CEO, and on 21 March he became vice-president of Pogoń Szczecin, the fourth-placed club in the Ekstraklasa.

== Personal life ==
Kesler married Ksenia Shamilova on 29 December 2019. The couple have a son together, born in Hull, on 26 April 2022.
