= Egyptians in the United Kingdom =

Egyptian diaspora in the UK

Total population
- Egyptian-born residents 24,700 (2001 Census); 31,338 (2011 Census); 39,000 (2019 ONS estimate)

Regions with significant populations
- London, Birmingham, Liverpool, Manchester, Glasgow

Languages
- British English, Egyptian Arabic

Religion
- Predominantly Islam (Egyptian Sufism and Sunni) and Christianity (Coptic Christian Orthodox); minority Judaism

Related ethnic groups
- Egyptian diaspora

Egyptians in the United Kingdom or Egyptian Britons are Egyptian citizens or people of Egyptian ancestry who are citizens or residents of the United Kingdom.

== Migration history ==
In Irish mythology, Scottish mythology, and pseudohistory, an Egyptian princess named Scota is mentioned as having arrived in today's Scotland (and/or in Ireland) in a very early period of these countries' history. The historical veracity of the story is greatly doubted, however. And under the Roman Empire, Britannia and Egypt were two provinces of a single empire which had considerable trade and interaction between its constituent parts. However, if any Egyptians settled in Roman Britain, there was little evidence left of their presence.

Egyptians historically have been averse to emigrating from their country, even when suffering with significant poverty. As such, prior to the late 1960s, only small numbers of Egyptians moved to the United Kingdom, and even then mostly for the purposes of study. As the Egyptian Revolution that began in 1952 developed an increasingly socialist character under Gamal Abdel Nasser, with the nationalisation of many private businesses, some upper and middle class Egyptians sought to leave the country. However, large scale emigration did not occur until after Egypt's defeat in the Six-Day War of 1967, which left the Sinai Peninsula entirely under Israeli occupation, and placed an immense economic burden on the country.

Given the severity of the country's economic woes following the war, particularly after the outbreak of the War of Attrition, the Egyptian Government saw advantages in Egyptians moving overseas to work and send home remittances. Therefore, it partially relaxed the strict regulations against emigration (which included requirements for exit visas). This change in approach was extended under Nasser's successor as President of Egypt, Anwar El-Sadat. Over the course of the 1970s and 1980s, many Egyptians took advantage of the loosening of these restrictions, and moved to Western states, such as the United Kingdom, and the oil rich states of the Persian Gulf.

Over the same period, heightened religious tension in Egypt resulted in further emigration, largely of Copts, although the numbers emigrating to the U.K. were small compared to Canada and Australia. With Egypt's economic liberalisation under Sadat in the 1970s, labour migration to the U.K. increased, as did the flow of Egyptians moving to the U.K. for higher education. Many students stayed in Britain after finishing their studies. During this time, many Egyptian businessmen migrated to the U.K. to establish businesses.

== Demographics ==
According to the 2001 UK Census, some 24,700 Egyptian-born people were present in the UK.

According to the 2011 UK Census, a total of 31,338 people born in Egypt were residing in the UK: 28,927 were recorded in England, 894 in Wales, 1,322 in Scotland, and 195 in Northern Ireland. The Office for National Statistics estimates that the equivalent figure in 2019 was 39,000.

== Prominent British-Egyptians or Egyptians residing in the United Kingdom ==
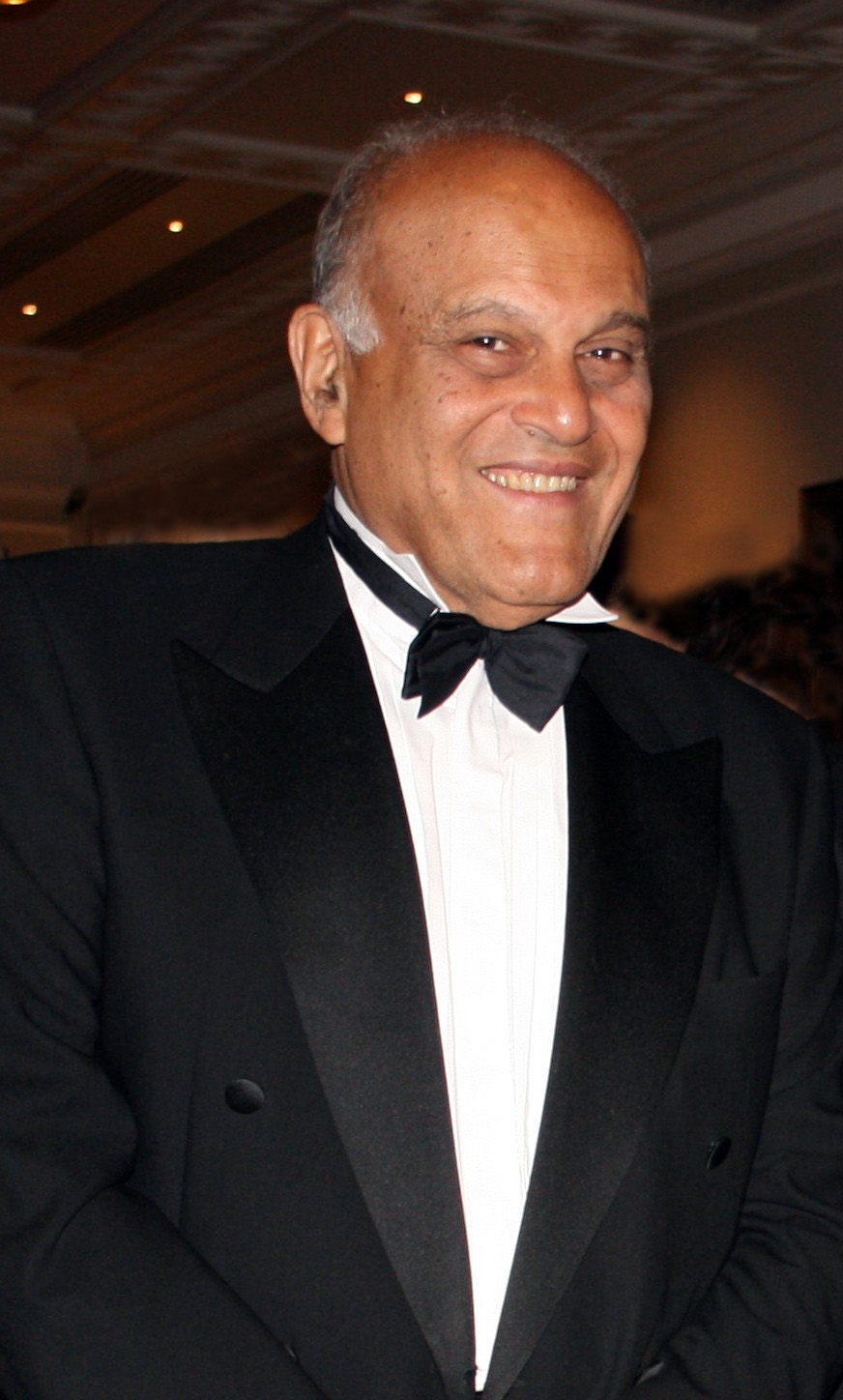
Sir Magdi Yacoub OM FRS, Professor of Cardiothoracic Surgery at Imperial College London

- Sir Magdi Yacoub OM FRS: British-Egyptian cardiothoracic surgeon celebrated as the surgeon that carried out UK's first heart and lung transplant in the 1980s.
- Hosney Yosef OBE: radiologist awarded an OBE in 2006 in recognition of his services to medicine in western Scotland.
- Anba Angaelos OBE: General Bishop in the United Kingdom of the Coptic Orthodox Church. He was awarded an OBE in 2015 for services to international religious freedom.
- Nemat Talaat Shafik, Baroness Shafik, DBE, HonFBA, known as Minouche Shafik, is an Egyptian-born British-American economist who has been serving as the Director of the London School of Economics since September 2017.

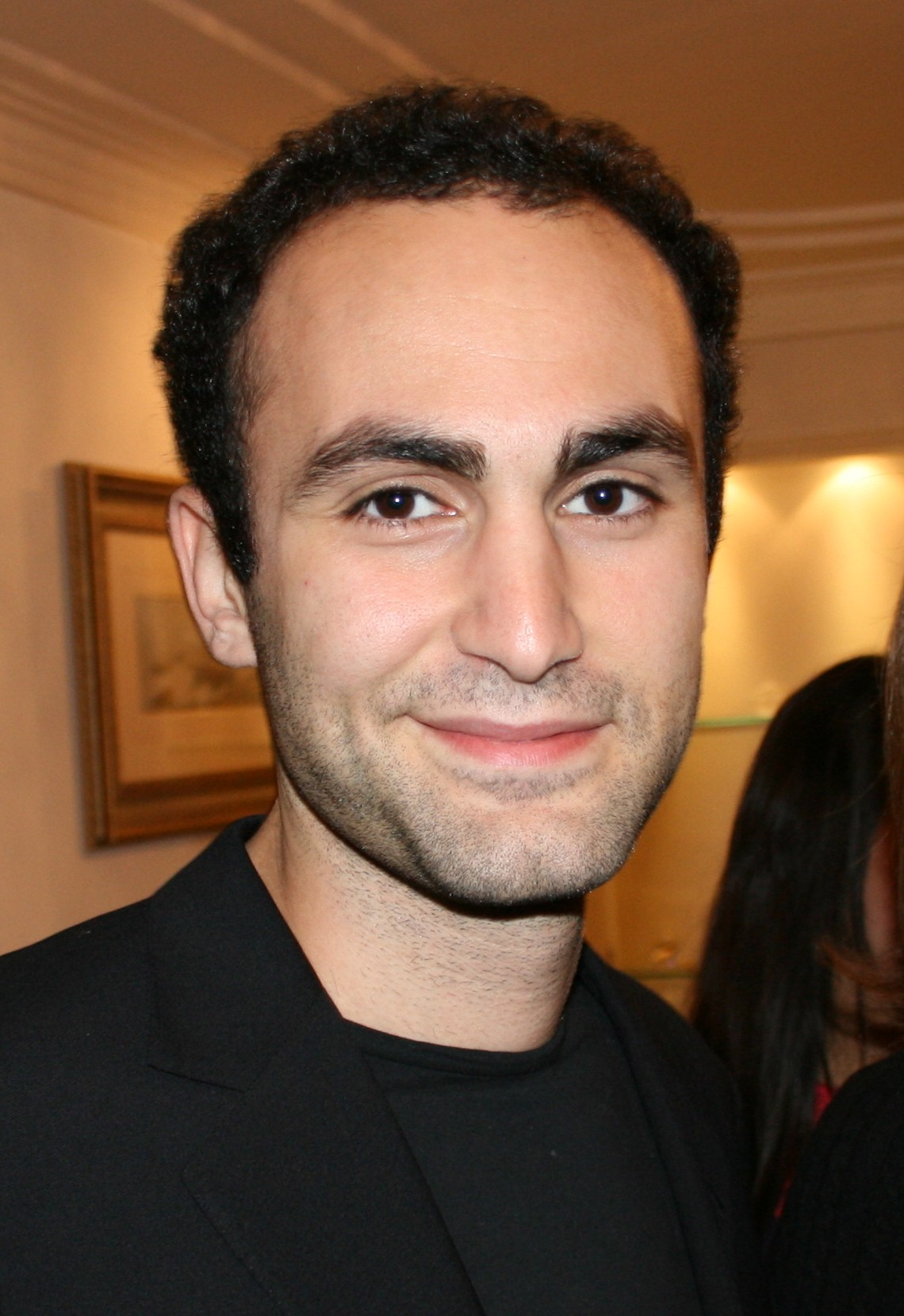
Khalid Abdalla, actor

- Khalid Abdalla: actor
- Sharif Afifi: actor
- Mohamed Al-Fayed: Egyptian businessman who resided in the United Kingdom. He was the owner of Hôtel Ritz Paris and formerly Harrods Department Store.
- Assem Allam: businessman and former president of Hull City Association Football Club
- Ehab Allam: businessman and former vice-chairman of Hull City A.F.C.
- Abu Hamza al-Masri
- Alexandra Avierino: Lebanese-born writer.
- Ahmed Barada: Egyptian-born squash player.
- Abdel-Majed Abdel Bary: former rapper and Islamist militant from Maida Vale.
- Mike Bishay: rugby league footballer who played for the London Skolars in League 1.
- Adel Darwish: commentator, historian, author, and Westminster parliament reporter
- Adam Deacon: actor, rapper, writer and director. He is known for his lead role in the films Kidulthood, sequel Adulthood and for his directorial debut, Anuvahood, Moroccan descent.
- Leila Deen: environmental activist, campaigning on the issues of climate change, poverty and water politics. She is program director at SumOfUs in Washington, DC.
- Adam El-Abd: semi-professional footballer who plays as a defender for Whitehawk and playing Egypt football team.
- Joe El-Abd: rugby union player. He currently coaches for Castres Olympique in France (Jan 2018).
- Hiba Elchikhe: actress
- Amir El-Masry: actor
- Ahmed Elmohamady: professional footballer. He plays for Premier League club Aston Villa and the Egypt national team.
- Mohamed Elneny: professional footballer. He played for the English club Arsenal, and plays for the Egypt national team.
- Fady Elsayed: actor
- Dodi Fayed: Egyptian socialite and son of businessman Mohamed Al-Fayed
- Nagy Habib: surgeon, selected as one of the top 10 surgeons in the UK by Saturday Times Magazine. He is the director of the hepato-pancreato-biliary (HPB) unit at Hammersmith Hospital.
- Magdy Ishak: orthopedic surgeon and the President of the Egyptian Medical Society UK
- Sabrina Mahfouz: poet and playwright
- Alya Mooro: journalist
- July Namir: actress
- Nxdia: musician
- Andrew Ridgeley: singer, songwriter, and record producer, best known for his work in the 1980s in the musical duo Wham!. His father is of mixed Italian-Egyptian Heritage.
- Mohamed Salah: (Mo Salah): professional footballer who plays for Liverpool F.C. and the Egypt national team. He is considered one of the best players in the world.
- Ahdaf Soueif: British-Egyptian novelist, short story writer and political and cultural commentator.
- Jade Thirlwall: member of the British girl group Little Mix.

== Associations ==
- The Egyptian British Centre
- St. Mary & Archangel Michael Church in London
- Saint Mary and Saint Mark Coptic Orthodox Centre, Birmingham (Lapworth)
- The Egyptian Community Association in the UK
- Midlands Egyptian Society

== See also ==
- British Arabs
- Egypt–United Kingdom relations
- Coptic Orthodox Church in Britain and Ireland
- Islam in the United Kingdom
