= Exxen =

Turkish content platform and production company

Exxen Dijital Yayıncılık A.Ş.
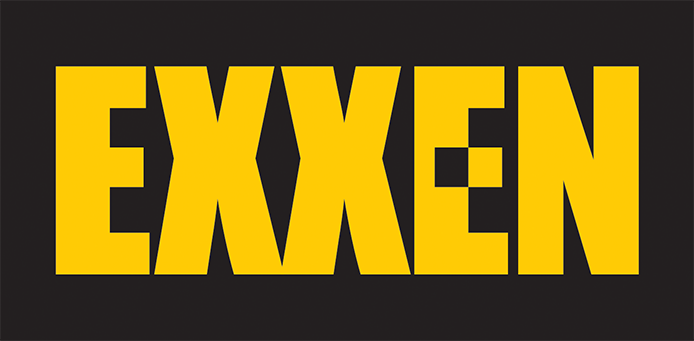
- Company type: S.A.
- Website type: OTT streaming platform
- Available in: 4 languages
- List of languages Turkish, English, Spanish, Arabic
- Founded: 2017
- Headquarters: Istanbul, {{{location_country}}}
- Country of origin: Turkey
- Area served: Worldwide
- Owner: Acun Medya
- Founder: Acun Ilıcalı
- Chairperson: Acun Ilıcalı
- General manager: Ümmü Burhan
- Key people: Acun Ilıcalı (owner)
- Industry: Technology & Entertainment industry
- Products: Streaming media; Pay television; Video on demand
- Services: Television production; Sportscasting
- Employees: 1,500 (2020)
- Parent: Acun Medya
- Website: www.exxen.com/en
- Registration: Required
- Users: >500,000 (2020, in Turkey)
- Launched: 1 January 2021; 5 years ago

Exxen is a Turkish subscription streaming service and production company. Owned by Acun Medya, a Turkish TV production and rights acquisition company, Exxen was launched on 1 January 2021. Exxen produces its own content, as well as owning various streaming rights of foreign productions and sports events.

== History ==
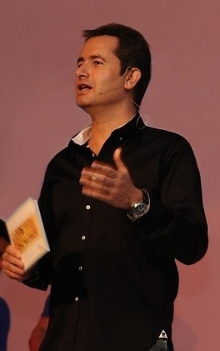
Acun Ilıcalı (pictured in 2010) is the current chairman of Exxen as of 2021

Exxen was established and commercially registered in Turkey, in 2017. The platform was first announced by Turkish media mogul Acun Ilıcalı through his Instagram account on 24 September 2020. The name of the platform was suggested by Ali Taran, Turkish marketing executive who held previously partnerships with Ilıcalı in various shows. In initial phase, the company hired around 1,500 employees to run its operations. Subsequently, it was revealed that the annual budget of the platform will be 900 million TRY. Launched on 1 January 2021, the number of user of the platform hit 500,000 users in three days after the launch, according to a statement from Ilıcalı via his social media account.

In June 2021, Exxen announced that they purchased the streaming rights of UEFA Champions League and UEFA Europa League for three consecutive seasons, starting from 2020–21.
