= Russell Bartlett =

British businessman

Russell Bartlett is a businessman and property investor and the former chairman and majority shareholder of Hull City football club.

He purchased Hull City from Adam Pearson in June 2007 as part of a consortium with Paul Duffen and (reportedly at the time) Martin Walker. They had made unsuccessful attempts to take over West Ham United and Cardiff City. Bartlett and Walker jointly own the Fortis property company. Duffen later stated, however, that Walker is not a shareholder in Hull City.

On 29 October 2009, with the club reportedly in financial difficulty, Duffen left his position at Hull City following disagreements with Bartlett over the direction of the club. Bartlett re-appointed Adam Pearson as chairman on 2 November, with one of his objectives being to attract outside investment - Bartlett is reportedly willing to sell up to 20% of his stake in the club.

Following Hull City's relegation from the Premier League in May 2010, a boardroom reshuffle took place at the club, seeing Adam Pearson step down as club chairman, a position which Bartlett himself then took up.

On 10 November 2010, it was reported that the owner of East Yorkshire-based Allam Marine, Assem Allam along with his son Ehab Allam had agreed to purchase a controlling interest in Hull City from Russell Bartlett. It was announced that Bartlett would remain involved in the club, although no information regarding his position as chairman was released.

On 17 December 2010, following a protracted period of due diligence, it was confirmed that Bartlett had sold his entire shareholding in Hull City to the Allam family for the nominal fee of £1, severing all links with the club and its liabilities. He was succeeded as chairman by Assem Allam.

Business positions
Preceded by Adam Pearson	Hull City A.F.C. chairman 2010	Succeeded by Assem Allam
