= 1905–06 in English football =

Football in England
- Season: 1905–06

Men's football
- First Division: Liverpool
- Second Division: Bristol City
- Southern League: Fulham
- FA Cup: Everton
- Charity Shield: The Wednesday

The 1905–06 season was the 35th season of competitive football in England.

== Events ==
Following the increase in size of the Football League from 36 clubs to 40, and with Doncaster Rovers having been relegated from the Second Division, four new clubs were elected into the league, along with Stockport County who had won the Lancashire Combination. These new clubs were: Chelsea, Hull City, Leeds City and Clapton Orient. Crystal Palace were formed this year but failed to gain election to the Football League by one vote and instead started their existence in the Southern League.

Bristol City, the only non-London League side south of Birmingham at the time, is promoted to the First Division as champions.

March 1906 - Aston Villa signed outside right, Herbert Kingaby from Clapton Orient, for the then undisclosed fee of £300 (2012: £27,000).

== Honours ==
Competition	Winner
First Division	Liverpool (2)
Second Division	Bristol City
FA Cup	Everton (1)
Home Championship	England & Scotland

Notes = Number in parentheses is the times that club has won that honour. * indicates new record for competition

== League tables ==
=== First Division ===
Pos	Team	Pld	W	D	L	GF	GA	GAv	Pts	Relegation
1	Liverpool (C)	38	23	5	10	79	46	1.717	51	
2	Preston North End	38	17	13	8	54	39	1.385	47	
3	The Wednesday	38	18	8	12	63	52	1.212	44	
4	Newcastle United	38	18	7	13	74	48	1.542	43	
5	Manchester City	38	19	5	14	73	54	1.352	43	
6	Bolton Wanderers	38	17	7	14	81	67	1.209	41	
7	Birmingham	38	17	7	14	65	59	1.102	41	
8	Aston Villa	38	17	6	15	72	56	1.286	40	
9	Blackburn Rovers	38	16	8	14	54	52	1.038	40	
10	Stoke	38	16	7	15	54	55	0.982	39	
11	Everton	38	15	7	16	70	66	1.061	37	
12	Woolwich Arsenal	38	15	7	16	62	64	0.969	37	
13	Sheffield United	38	15	6	17	57	62	0.919	36	
14	Sunderland	38	15	5	18	61	70	0.871	35	
15	Derby County	38	14	7	17	39	58	0.672	35	
16	Notts County	38	11	12	15	55	71	0.775	34	
17	Bury	38	11	10	17	57	74	0.770	32	
18	Middlesbrough	38	10	11	17	56	71	0.789	31	
19	Nottingham Forest (R)	38	13	5	20	58	79	0.734	31	Relegation to the Second Division
20	Wolverhampton Wanderers (R)	38	8	7	23	58	99	0.586	23	Relegation to the Second Division

Source: World Football
Rules for classification: 1) Points; 2) Goal average; 3) Goals scored
(C) Champions; (R) Relegated

=== Second Division ===
Pos	Team	Pld	W	D	L	GF	GA	GAv	Pts	Promotion
1	Bristol City (C, P)	38	30	6	2	83	28	2.964	66	Promotion to the First Division
2	Manchester United (P)	38	28	6	4	90	28	3.214	62	Promotion to the First Division
3	Chelsea	38	22	9	7	90	37	2.432	53	
4	West Bromwich Albion	38	22	8	8	79	36	2.194	52	
5	Hull City	38	19	6	13	67	54	1.241	44	
6	Leeds City	38	17	9	12	59	47	1.255	43	
7	Leicester Fosse	38	15	12	11	53	48	1.104	42	
8	Grimsby Town	38	15	10	13	46	46	1.000	40	
9	Burnley	38	15	8	15	42	53	0.792	38	
10	Stockport County	38	13	9	16	44	56	0.786	35	
11	Bradford City	38	13	8	17	46	60	0.767	34	
12	Barnsley	38	12	9	17	60	62	0.968	33	
13	Lincoln City	38	12	6	20	69	72	0.958	30	
14	Blackpool	38	10	9	19	37	62	0.597	29	
15	Gainsborough Trinity	38	12	4	22	44	57	0.772	28	
16	Glossop	38	10	8	20	49	71	0.690	28	
17	Burslem Port Vale	38	12	4	22	49	82	0.598	28	
18	Chesterfield Town	38	10	8	20	40	72	0.556	28	Re-elected
19	Burton United	38	10	6	22	34	67	0.507	26	Re-elected
20	Clapton Orient	38	7	7	24	35	78	0.449	21	Re-elected

(C) Champions; (P) Promoted
