= Martin Walker (football director) =

Martin Walker is a former director of Hull City football club.

He joined Hull City in June 2007 as part of a consortium with Paul Duffen and Russell Bartlett. They had made unsuccessful attempts to take over West Ham United and Cardiff City.

Bartlett and Walker jointly own the Fortis property company.

In a 2009 interview, Paul Duffen stated that Walker does not hold any shares in Hull City.

On 28 May 2010, he resigned from his position on the Hull City board.
