= John Kirton =

Founder and director of G7 and G20 Research Groups (born 1948)

John James Kirton (born 1948) is a professor emeritus of Political Science at the University of Toronto. He is the founder and director of the G7 Research Group and the G20 Research Group, the co-founder of the Global Health Diplomacy Program with James Orbinski, and the co-founder of the BRICS Research Group with Marina Larionova of the Russian Presidential Academy of National Economy and Public Administration.

== Education ==
Kirton received a B.A. in Political Science from the University of Toronto in 1971, an M.A. in International Affairs from Carleton University in 1973, and a Ph.D. in International Studies from the Paul H. Nitze School of Advanced International Studies at Johns Hopkins University in 1977.

== Career ==
At the University of Toronto, John Kirton directed the G7 Research Group, Canadian Foreign Policy Research Group, G20 Research Group, BRICS Research Group, and Global Health Diplomacy Program. His research interests include global summit governance and Canadian foreign policy, global health governance, global finance, and global environmental governance.

Kirton's work on Canadian foreign policy Kirton introduced the neorealism theory of Canada's emergence as a principal power in the world through his books, Canada as a Principal Power (co-written with David DeWitt) and Canadian Foreign Policy in a Changing World.

In the field of trade and environment, Kirton led a team that developed an analytical framework for assessing the environmental effects of the North American Free Trade Agreement (NAFTA) and identified the contributions of the Commission for Environmental Cooperation to ecological quality throughout the region. He has also served as a member of Canada's National Round Table on the Environment and the Economy.

=== Publications ===
The author or editor of more than 35 books, Kirton is the editor of the Global Governance book series, as well as co-editor (with Miranda Schreurs) of the Global Environmental Governance book series published by Routledge Publishing; he was also the co-editor (with Michele Fratianni and Paolo Savona) of the Global Finance series published by Ashgate Publishing. He is co-editor of several publications on the G7 and G20, and also a series on "Health: A Political Choice" published by GT Media.

== Other activities ==
Kirton serves on the board of the NATO Council of Canada (formerly the Atlantic Council of Canada) and the Empire Club of Canada. He was a member of the board of the Couchiching Institute on Public Affairs until 2013. He continues in an advisory role for Couchiching events, which are now hosted by the Canadian International Council.
