= Sunday Times Rich List 2010 =

Annually published UK list

The Sunday Times Rich List 2010 was published on 25 April 2010.

Since 1989 the UK national Sunday newspaper The Sunday Times has published an annual magazine supplement to the newspaper called the Sunday Times Rich List. The list is based on an estimate of the minimum wealth of the richest 1,000 people or families in the United Kingdom as of January of that year, and is compiled by Philip Beresford. A separate section lists the 250 richest Irish, including both Northern Ireland and the Republic of Ireland.

As in previous years, the Rich List was widely previewed in the UK media and extensively covered on the day of its publication. The top four places in the Rich List were unchanged from the previous year.

Among the most notable changes were a rise in the collective wealth of the Rich List by almost a third over the previous year — the largest annual increase up to that point in the then 22-year history of the List.

Notable changes in rankings include: Uzbek-Russian Alisher Usmanov, up to 6th from 18th; Canadian Galen Weston and family, rising to 7th from 47th; and Indian Anil Agarwal, moving to 10th from 70th. In addition, one new entry to the list, Chinese property tycoon Joseph Lau, immediately landed just outside the top 10, coming in at 12th.

== Top 12 fortunes ==
2010		Name	Citizenship	Source of wealth	2009	
Rank	Net worth £ bn	Name	Citizenship	Source of wealth	Rank	Net worth £ bn
1	£22.45 ▲	Lakshmi Mittal and family	India	Steel	1	£10.80
2	£7.40 ▲	Roman Abramovich	Russia	Oil, industry, owner of Chelsea FC	2	£7.00
3	£6.75 ▲	The Duke of Westminster	United Kingdom	Property	3	£6.50
4	£5.95 ▲	Ernesto and Kirsty Bertarelli	Switzerland & United Kingdom	Pharmaceuticals	4	£5.00
5 ▲	£5.53 ▲	David and Simon Reuben	United Kingdom	Property	9	£2.50
6▲	£4.70 ▲	Alisher Usmanov	Russia	Steel, mining	18	£1.50
7▲	£4.50 ▲	Galen Weston, George Weston and family	Canada	Retailing (George Weston Limited)	47	£0.90
8 ▼	£4.40 ▲	Charlene Carvalho and Michel Carvalho	Netherlands	Inheritance, banking, brewing (Heineken)	7	£2.96
9 ▼	£4.11 ▲	Sir Philip Green and Lady Green	United Kingdom	Retailing	6	£3.83
10 ▲	£4.10 ▲	Anil Agarwal	India	Mining	70	£0.60
11 ▼	£4.00	Hans Rausing and family	Sweden	Packaging	5	£4.00
12 ▲	£3.83 ▲	Joseph Lau	China	Property	n/a	not listed

== See also ==
- Lists of billionaires
