= Peter Gadsby =

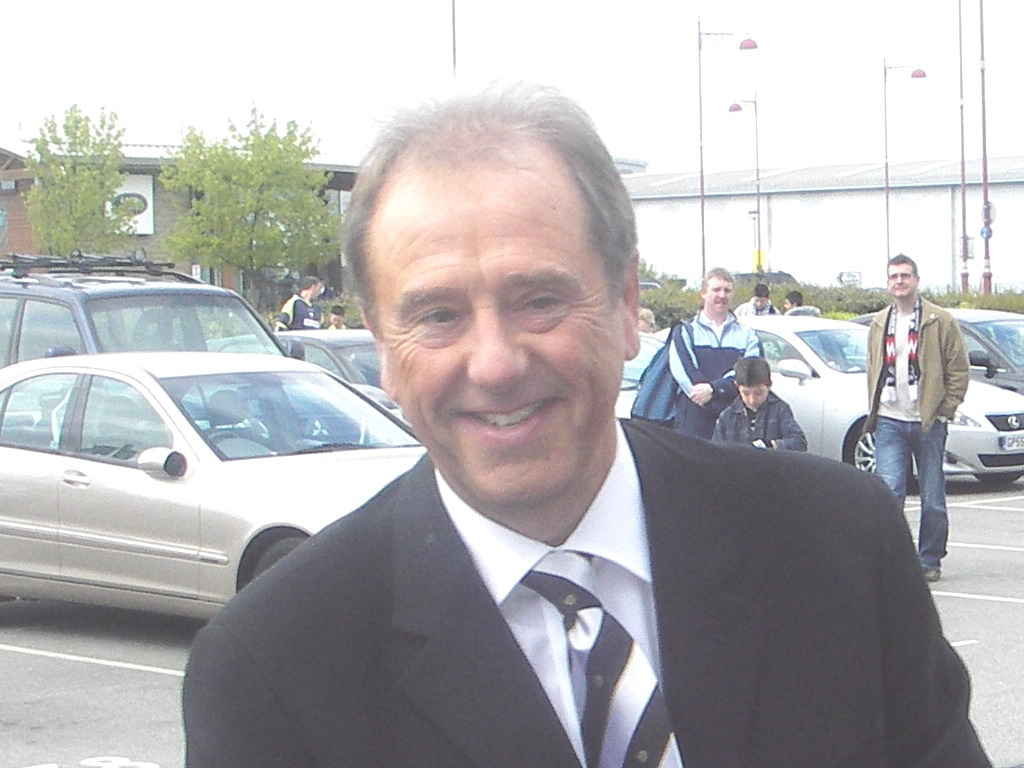
Peter Gadsby

Peter Gadsby is a millionaire property developer and lifelong Derby County fan who led a consortium to buy out Derby County football club in 2006.

== Derby County takeover ==
After securing the takeover of the club, Gadsby and his consortium set about hiring a manager who could rebuild the Derby squad, which at the end of a disappointing season had only one recognised striker, in the form of Paul Peschisolido. After a decision-making process which took some time, former Preston North End manager, Billy Davies was installed as the Ram's new manager. The consortium managed to clear a significant proportion of the club's debts, which had reportedly risen to an estimated £52 million, as well as restoring ownership of Pride Park Stadium to the club. As a result, Davies was allowed a respectable transfer budget, and Steve Howard was Derby's first £1 million signing since 2000.

== Impact at Derby County ==
Gadsby and the consortium were welcomed to Derby as heroes after purchasing the club. Under the management of Billy Davies, the new board had a '3-year plan' with which they planned to rebuild the team, and allow them to challenge for promotion into the premiership. However, in January 2007, Derby were top of the table, and looking like promotion contenders. The board decided to release more money for transfers, seeing the arrival of Craig Fagan, David Jones and others. Derby didn't manage to secure automatic promotion. Instead they found themselves in a toughly contested game against West Bromwich Albion, which was reportedly worth £60 million in premiership TV rights for the 2007/08 season. Derby managed to win the game 1–0, making it back to the premier division after a 5-year absence.

== New 3-year Plan ==
On 29 May 2007, Gadsby made it known on an interview to Sky Sports that he had discussed with other premiership chairmen a possible financial model for Derby County. He also mentioned another '3-year plan' in which he hoped to expand the stadium and bring European football to Pride Park. Gadsby also mentioned that whilst ensuring that the club did not overspend, a significant amount of money for transfers would be available.

== Derby County attempted takeover ==
On 11 March 2010, Gadsby attempted to gain control on the football club in a 37 million pound bid, this is after he has "had enough" of the American owners breaking promises. Within his offer he promised to give current manager Nigel Clough a 5 million transfer budget. He also went on to say in a statement "The qualities I value most in business and in life are passionate commitment, loyalty and trust – the very things I have always offered during a lifelong love affair with Derby County and 20 years involved in the running of the club and the development of Pride Park". Other plans that Gadsby made included a major redevelopment initiative for 70 acres (280,000 m^{2}) of land adjoining Pride Park and renewing my commitment to the Pride Plaza project, which offers a variety of dining and refreshment options to improve the match-day experience for supporters, a promise to establish a new trust comprising members of the various supporters' groups and gift to it ten per cent of the equity of DCFC and affordable season tickets and catering. However, this was immediately dismissed by chairman Tom Glick stating "the club is not for sale".

== Career in Property Development Success ==
Peter Gadsby's CV includes the chairmanship of Miller Birch and Cedar House Investments. He is currently leading a project for Cedar House to develop the former Sunlight Laundry site in Nottingham's Colwick district, which will kickstart the development of Nottingham's 'Waterside Regeneration Zone'. It is thought this could include a new super-stadium for Nottingham's football, rugby and hockey clubs.
