= Assem Allam =

Egyptian-British businessman (1939–2022)

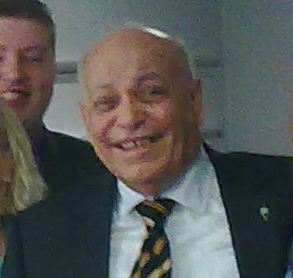
- Allam in 2011
- Born: 1 August 1939; Kingdom of Egypt
- Died: 2 December 2022 (aged 83); Kingston upon Hull, England
- Education: Ain Shams University; University of Hull
- Occupation: Businessman
- Known for: Industrial manufacturer

President of Hull City
- In office September 2010 – 19 January 2022
- Preceded by: Russell Bartlett
- Succeeded by: Acun Ilıcalı

Assem Allam (Arabic: عاصم علام; 1 August 1939 – 2 December 2022) was an Egyptian-British businessman, based in the East Riding of Yorkshire from 1968. He was the owner of Allam Marine, an industrial generator manufacturer, and Hull City Association Football Club.

== Early life ==
Born in Egypt in 1939, Allam moved to the UK from Gamal Abdel Nasser's regime in Egypt in 1968. He studied economics at the University of Hull.

== Career ==
After qualifying as an accountant, he started work at Tempest Diesel Limited. In 1981, he used a loan to begin a buy-out of the company. In 1992 the company was put into administrative receivership at the behest of Barclays Bank, along with Ruscador Shipyard Limited, resulting in the redundancy of the company's entire workforce of more than 50.

In the same year, he incorporated a purchase of the companies assets through a new company, Allam Marine Limited, subsequently leading the company to international success.

Allam and his son were included in the Sunday Times Rich List 2010. In 2006, he was named the UK Entrepreneur of the Year by Ernst & Young, the same firm of accountants who acted as Administrative Receivers of Tempest and Ruscador.

== Hull City A.F.C. ==
In September 2010, there was speculation that Allam was interested in investing in Hull City, the local football team, which had been relegated from the Premier League earlier in 2010 with extensive financial problems. On 18 October 2010 it was said that Allam, along with his son Ehab, had entered negotiations with Hull City owner and chairman, Russell Bartlett. Allam confirmed at the time that he felt the need to "pay back to the area," and that Hull City were important to the area. On 10 November 2010, the Allams said that a deal had been agreed for a controlling interest in the club, and that they would assume control once the relevant requirements had been met.

While it was originally reported that Allam intended to only purchase a majority shareholding in the club, and would continue to work with Bartlett, a protracted period of due diligence indicated that the investment required would be substantially higher than originally planned; this resulted in a move to obtain complete shareholding control of the club. The deal was formally completed at 10:45 pm on 16 December 2010, with the club changing hands for the nominal fee of £1, and with Allam and his son Ehab committing themselves to invest £30 million, as well as providing assurance for a further £10 million.

Following the takeover, it was confirmed on the official club website that Allam would take up the role of chairman at the club. On 4 May 2013, Hull City clinched promotion back to the Premier League.

On 9 August 2013, Allam announced that the club would discard its 109-year old name and be, henceforth, "marketed" as Hull City Tigers locally and Hull Tigers to national and international audiences. Announcing the change in the Hull Daily Mail newspaper, he said: "'Hull City' is irrelevant...it is common. I want the club to be special. It is about identity. 'City' is a lousy identity. 'Hull City Association Football Club' is so long." The club's Managing Director Nick Thompson urged supporters "to judge it in the fullness of time." The announcement stated that all references to "AFC" on club branding will be phased out, although they will remain on the shirt crest during their first season back in the Premier League. On 12 September 2013, Allam, speaking to an interviewer, predicted that "in a few years many clubs will follow and change their names to something more interesting and I will have proved I am a leader." He added that if he were the owner of Manchester City, he would change their name to "Manchester Hunter".

Allam's plans to change the name of the club were met with strong opposition from supporters of the club, whose complaints he dismissed, stating "nobody questions my decisions in my business." In response to the formation of a group opposed to the name change entitled "City Till We Die," Allam responded that the supporters involved "can die as soon as they want, as long as they leave the club for the majority who just want to watch good football." On 9 April 2014, the FA rejected Allam's proposal to change the club's name. Allam subsequently announced his intention to appeal the decision.

In early 2016, the club announced plans to replace the existing season ticket system with a new membership scheme, aiming to reduce match day costs for fans. The announcement was met with criticism from Hull City fans, with the scheme set to remove concessionary discounts and instead charge a flat rate to claim seats in particular sections of the stadium. It has also been suggested that the new system will force sections of fans to move to another area of the stadium to maintain their match day seats. Since the changes were announced, match day attendances at the KCOM Stadium have fallen significantly, with Hull City's 2016–17 campaign in the Premier League producing an average attendance figure of 20,761, a 12 per cent decrease on their previous season in the Premier League, while their 2017–18 campaign back in the Championship has so far been averaging just 15,980 fans. In spite of attendances falling, vice-chairman Ehab Allam has defended the new scheme, and has stated that it will remain.

Allam's running of the club came under criticism in the summer of 2016, when after Hull City had regained promotion to the Premier League, the club only had twelve fit senior professionals available to play in the club's opening day fixture against reigning champions Leicester City, with no acquisitions having been made since their Championship play-off final win and with no permanent manager in place after Steve Bruce's resignation in the off-season.

Allam's ownership of the club again came under scrutiny in the summer of 2017, following Hull's relegation from the Premier League, where upwards of seven key first team players were sold during the transfer window. Hull again started a season with a threadbare squad depleted by injuries, and made a poor start to their first season back in the Championship under manager Leonid Slutsky. He was sacked just months into the new season in early December, with the club having been on a poor run of two wins in 15 games, and firmly in a relegation battle.

In late 2017, the club was still available for sale by the Allam family, with Assem Allam stating that the club "is no closer to being sold". Allam cited issues with the club's stadium ownership and "militant" fan backlash surrounding the running of the club as reasons for a potential sale being delayed.

On 19 January 2022, Hull City announced that Acun Medya, backed by Acun Ilıcalı, had purchased the club from Allam.

== Hull Kingston Rovers ==
In May 2011, Allam gave a £1 million gift to Hull Kingston Rovers rugby league club "to be used for stadium improvements and strengthening the playing staff".

== Squash sponsorship ==
In October 2011, Allam signed a three-year sponsorship of the British Open Squash Championships. The event was successfully moved to Kingston upon Hull in 2013 and repeated in 2014 and 2015. The Allam sponsorship has continued until the 2019 event when his sponsorship of the event was renewed.

== Philanthropy ==
In 2016 he donated £7 million towards the cost of a £25 million medical building at the University of Hull. In November 2019, he donated around £8 million to Hull University Teaching Hospitals NHS Trust for the creation of a diabetes treatment and research centre based at Hull Royal Infirmary and Castle Hill Hospital. He was also a donor to the Labour Party.

== Death ==
Allam died of cancer in Kingston upon Hull, on 2 December 2022, at the age of 83.

Business positions
Preceded by Russell Bartlett	Hull City A.F.C. chairman 2010–2022	Succeeded by Acun Ilıcalı
