= Ehab Allam =

British-Egyptian executive

- Born: July 1971 (age 54–55); Kingston upon Hull, England
- Occupation: Business executive

Vice-chairman – Hull City
- In office 16 December 2010 – 19 January 2022
- Preceded by: Position established
- Succeeded by: Tan Kesler

Ehab Allam (born July 1971) is a British-Egyptian business executive who was the vice-chairman of association football club Hull City from 2010 to 2022. He is the son of Assem Allam.

== Biography ==
=== Family ===
Allam was born in Kingston upon Hull, England, in July 1971. His father, Assem, was a businessman, who had moved to the city to escape the regime of Gamal Abdel Nasser in his home country of Egypt just three years earlier. He died of cancer on 2 December 2022. His mother's name is Fatima. Allam also has two sisters, Eman and Enais.

=== Career ===
On 16 December 2010, Allam's father became chairman of Hull City, having completed a takeover of the Championship side amidst a financial crisis. Allam was immediately appointed vice-chairman to help run the club on a day-to-day basis. Having saved Hull from debts of over £30m, and returned them to the Premier League in 2013, the Allams were well-liked amongst supporters. That was until 9 August 2013, when Assem announced that the club would be undergoing a name change process to become "Hull City Tigers". The news created enormous fan backlash, eventually resulting in Assem commenting that the club's supporters "can die as soon as they want" in retaliation to their campaign group named "City Till We Die".

Although the name change proposal was rejected on two separate occasions, once in 2014 and again in 2015, the ties between the Allams and the Hull fans had been permanently severed. It was around this time that Ehab became the club's permanent CEO due to his father's ill health, fulfilling even more duties than he already was. By the time the Tigers were relegated back to the second tier in 2015, the club had been put up for sale. No buyers were initially placed to take control of Hull, and so the Allams reluctantly continued their tenure throughout the 2015–16 season. Manager Steve Bruce, who had been appointed by the Allams in 2012 and engineered a strong friendship with the father-and-son duo, steered the club back to the top-flight at the end of the season. However, on 22 July 2016, Bruce resigned due to an alleged rift between him and the ownership hierarchy.

Fans began to boycott home games in protest of the Allams' ownership from the beginning of the 2016–17 season. Following Hull's relegation that year, attendances slowly began to dwindle, reaching a nadir in the 2019–20 campaign, with an average of 11,553 spectators watching the Tigers at home prior to the COVID-19 pandemic forcing the final nine games of the season to be played behind closed doors. After nearly eight years since the club went up for sale, Turkish media mogul Acun Ilıcalı and his company Acun Medya completed a takeover of Hull City on 19 January 2022. The next week, Ehab Allam released a message to the club's fans thanking them for their support throughout his family's 11 years in charge.
