= Paul Duffen =

British businessman

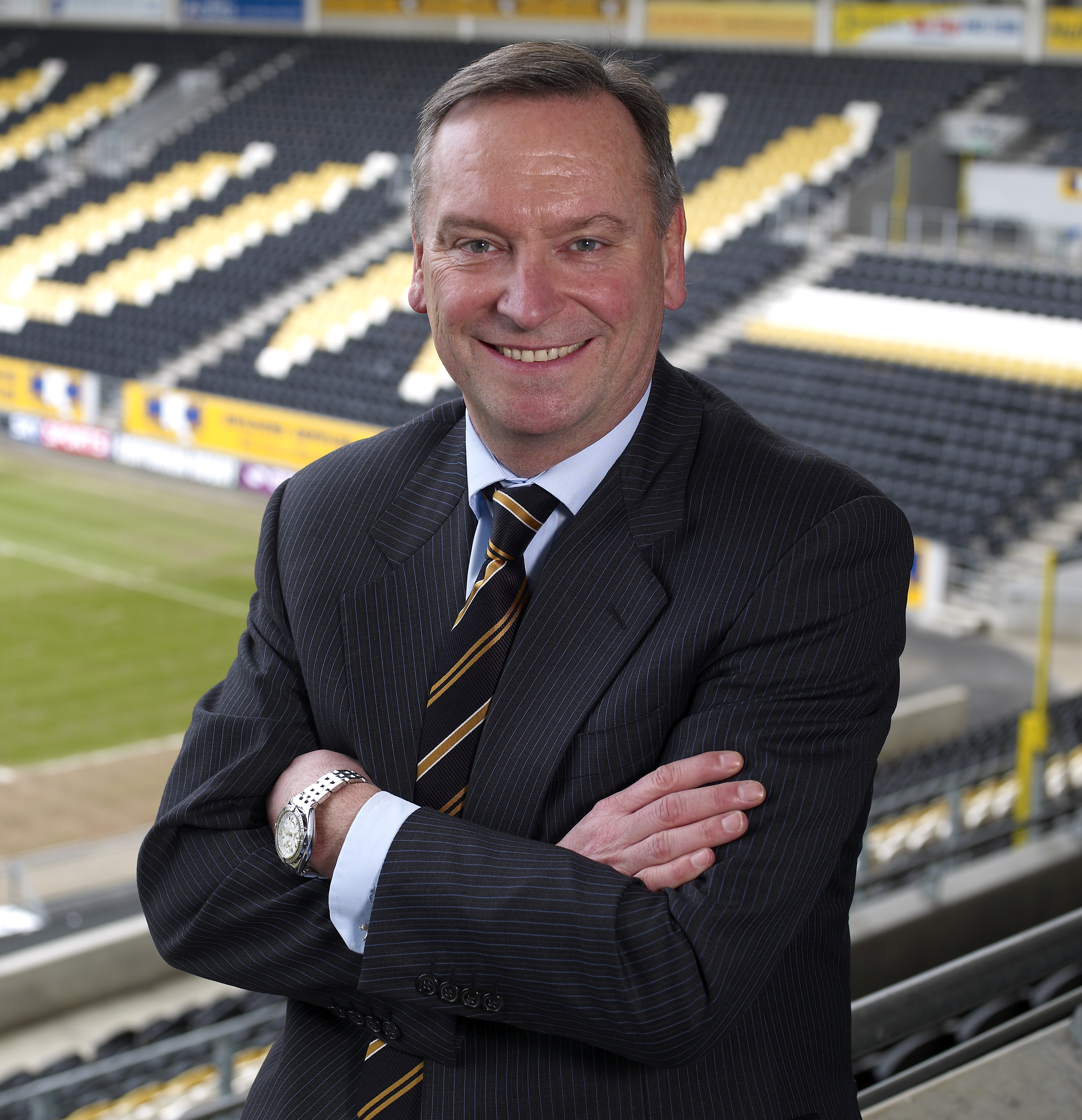
- Duffen in 2008
- Born: Paul Jeremy Duffen; 31 July 1958 (age 68); Woodford Green, England
- Education: Lancing College
- Occupation: Businessman

Chairman – Hull City
- In office 11 June 2007 – 29 October 2009
- Preceded by: Adam Pearson
- Succeeded by: Adam Pearson

Paul Jeremy Duffen (born 31 July 1958) is a British businessman who is best known for being the chairman of association football club Hull City from 2007 to 2010.

Duffen also became the chairman of publishing firm Newsdesk Media in June 2011. Additionally, Duffen sits on the boards of several companies, including Pro-Cure Therapeutics Ltd, a life sciences business based in York and RISC Management Ltd, a London-based security consultancy.

== Early life ==
Duffen grew up in Surrey, the middle of three brothers. He was educated at Lancing College in Sussex and played cricket for Surrey County Cricket Club (SCCC) at Under 19 level. Duffen started his career with Procter & Gamble in a sales and marketing role.

In 1981, Duffen joined distribution company P J Holloway (Sales) Ltd, based in North London, where he was appointed Marketing Director and played a key role in the sale of the business in 1985 to Browne and Tawse plc. He subsequently held the position of managing director at two private companies and later started his own management consultancy business which from 1997 focused on the sport, broadcast and internet sectors.

== Catalyst Media Group ==
In October 1999, Duffen co-founded Newsplayer, a pioneer in online video distribution and ‘web TV’ channels. Duffen led the successful flotation of the company on the Alternative Investment Market (AIM) of the London Stock Exchange in May 2000. With Duffen as CEO, Catalyst Media Group plc (the company changed its name in 2004), was involved in significant M&A activity successfully raising over £75 million in debt and equity to enable various transactions on both sides of the Atlantic. In particular, CMG bought a £22m stake in UK-based Satellite Information Services (SIS), a leading outside broadcast services provider (Duffen sat on the Board of SIS Holdings Ltd). CMG's investment in SIS evolved the company from a start-up developing internet video through experimental hybrid revenue models into a financially robust asset based business.

== Hull City A.F.C. ==
=== Takeover ===
In June 2007, Duffen, in a consortium with majority shareholder Russell Bartlett, purchased Hull City from Adam Pearson for a reported £13 million in June 2007 and replaced him as chairman and chief executive of the football club and the related Stadium Management Company Ltd. The consortium had already made unsuccessful attempts to take over West Ham United and Cardiff City.

When Duffen took control of Hull City the club had just finished 21st in the Championship, narrowly avoiding relegation to League One. He immediately announced the permanent appointment of caretaker manager Phil Brown who had steered the club to Championship survival. During his first summer in charge, Duffen followed through on a pledge to invest in the team with the aim of achieving promotion to the top flight for the first time in the club's history within three years. The million pound signing of striker Caleb Folan from Wigan was the most expensive in the club's history. Duffen brought in other high earners such as former Nigeria captain and BBC African Footballer of the Year Jay-Jay Okocha and his former Bolton teammate Henrik Pedersen to almost double the club's wage bill. Despite some new funds, the club relied heavily on loan signings to strengthen the squad, most notably Fraizer Campbell who was brought in from Manchester United in October 2007.

=== Historic promotion to Premier League ===
Under Phil Brown's management, Hull City exceeded Duffen's ambitious targets by finishing third in the Championship in his first season, equalling their highest-ever finish in 1909–10. They went on to make their first ever appearance at Wembley, defeating Bristol City 1–0 in the Championship play-off final to secure promotion to the top flight for the first time in the club's 104-year history. He once again pledged to invest in the team, stating (prior to the final) that "the vast majority of the money that would come in from being in the Premier League would go to Phil for team strengthening and increasing the wage bill".

To strengthen the squad for the Premier League campaign, Duffen and Brown signed Brazilian attacking midfielder Geovanni following his release from Manchester City and spent £2.5 million, a new club transfer record, to sign Anthony Gardner on a permanent contract having been with the club on loan from Tottenham Hotspur. Other key signings included Dutch international midfielder George Boateng from Middlesbrough, strikers Daniel Cousin (from Glasgow Rangers) and Marlon King (on loan from Wigan) and defenders Kamil Zayatte (from BSC Young Boys) and Bernard Mendy (who had been released by Paris St Germain).

Despite the new signings, Phil Brown retained faith with a core of the team that had secured their recent success. Three players, Andy Dawson, Boaz Myhill and club captain Ian Ashbee had played for Hull City in all four divisions of the English professional game.

Hull City began their first season in the Premier League in impressive style securing a 2–1 home victory against Fulham in the club's first Premier League match and before the end of September had secured away wins at Arsenal and Tottenham. Phil Brown was named Premier League Manager of the Month in September 2008 when the club rose to third place on the back of winning 14 points from seven matches during the month. As a result of that League position Hull City qualified to play in the Premier League Asia Trophy in Beijing in the summer of 2009 alongside Tottenham Hotspur and West Ham United. From November, however, performances and results fell away and the team began to slide down the Premier League table to a position more closely aligned with the club's spending power.

The club sought to strengthen the squad during the January 2009 transfer window to help reverse Hull City's downward trajectory. The priority was to sign a goalscoring midfielder and the club seemed to have achieved just that with the signing of England midfielder Jimmy Bullard who signed for a record £5 million from Fulham. Bullard ruptured his anterior cruciate ligament in his debut for Hull City, against West Ham United and had to wait to the following October before returning to first team action. Additionally, the club signed loanee Kamil Zayette on a permanent deal from BSC Young Boys for a three-year contract and a fee of £2.5 million.

Hull City only narrowly survived their first season in the Premier League finishing in 17th, just one place one point above the relegation position. Hull City lost 0–1 at home to the Premier League champions Manchester United, but escaped relegation following Newcastle United's defeat away at Aston Villa.

Duffen's role in bringing success to the club was recognised at the Real Yorkshire Awards in March 2009 with a special award for "the single biggest contribution to tourism and the economy in Hull and East Yorkshire". Outside of football, Duffen sat on the board of Visit Hull and East Yorkshire Ltd.

=== Resignation ===
There was frustration in the transfer market for the club during the summer with unsuccessful attempts to sign Frazier Campbell, Michael Owen, Marc-Antoine Fortune and Bobby Zamora. The club did bring in Stephen Hunt, Jozy Altidore, Kamel Ghilas and Jan Vennegoor of Hesselink, all players with international caps, but they failed to stop Hull City's run of poor results. The team had eight points after the first ten games of the season. On 29 October 2009, Duffen resigned from his position as Hull chairman, stating that he believed he should take ultimate responsibility for the Football Club's poor results in 2009. Following his resignation the club issued a statement expressing its "gratitude to Paul for his outstanding contribution as chairman during a period of unprecedented success for Hull City AFC."

Duffen later admitted disagreements and friction in his working relationship with Bartlett, but defended his stewardship of the club and the financial position in which he left it. In January 2010, the club said it was to take legal action against Duffen for alleged wrongdoing. Duffen maintained this was in response to action initiated by him against the Club for non-payment of monies he was owed following his resignation. In February 2010 the club announced that a settlement had been reached "bringing an end to all disputes between the parties."

== Newsdesk Media ==
Duffen was appointed Chairman of Newsdesk Media in June 2011, a company founded by CEO Alan Spence, a former Financial Times journalist, in 1995. Newsdesk publishes strategic reviews and annual and centenary books, among a range of editorial formats, under contract or in partnership with transnational organisations, governments and public sector institutions, including sovereign wealth funds, industry associations and private corporations. Newsdesk's clients include: the OECD; the G8 Research Group; the G20 Research Group; the European Climate Exchange; the Atlantic Council; the London Stock Exchange, Airbus and the British Army. The company also publishes an ‘Invest In...’ series of titles for the African Union as well as a number of other economies, including Nigeria, Jordan, Kuwait and Azerbaijan.

== Personal life ==
Duffen has five children, two of whom have left university and are working in London. He lives in Surrey with his wife Emma and three younger children.

Business positions
Preceded by Adam Pearson	Hull City A.F.C. chairman 2007–2009	Succeeded by Adam Pearson
