= Acun Ilıcalı =

Turkish television businessman (born 1969)

- Acun Ilıcalı in 2024
- Born: Ali Acun Ilıcalı; 29 May 1969 (age 57); Uzunköprü, Edirne, Turkey
- Education: Kadıköy Anadolu Lisesi; Istanbul University (left)
- Occupations: Businessman; TV producer; TV personality; entrepreneur; reality TV judge
- Years active: 1991–present
- Spouses: Seda Başbuğ (m. 1988; div. 1993) Zeynep Yılmaz (m. 2003; div. 2016) Şeyma Subaşı (m. 2017; div. 2018) Ayça Çağla Altunkaya (m. 2024)
- Children: 4

President of Hull City
- Incumbent
- Assumed office 19 January 2022
- Preceded by: Assem Allam

Ali Acun Ilıcalı (Turkish pronunciation: [aˈdʒun ɯˈɫɯdʒaɫɯ]; born 29 May 1969) is a Turkish broadcaster, entrepreneur, international TV producer, and businessman. He is the owner of the TV channels TV8 and TV8.5, Turkey's digital platform Exxen. He is the founder and director of ACUNMEDYA, an international television production company.

Several documentaries and programs have been made about Ilıcalı's life, covering his career from sports reporter to media mogul. From 2018 to 2021, he was listed among the 500 most influential businessmen in the media and entertainment sector by Variety magazine.

== Early years ==
Acun Ilıcalı, whose family comes from Turkey's northeast Erzurum Province, was born in Edirne on 29 May 1969. He has paternal Azerbaijani ancestry. When Ilıcalı was 21 years old, both of his parents died in a car crash, causing him to become depressed and not leave his house for a year.

== Media career ==
Ilıcalı started his career in the media sector at the age of 22 as a football-focussed Sports Reporter for Turkish television channel Show TV. In 2002, Ilıcalı produced several programs and content for a number of Turkey's most popular television channels.

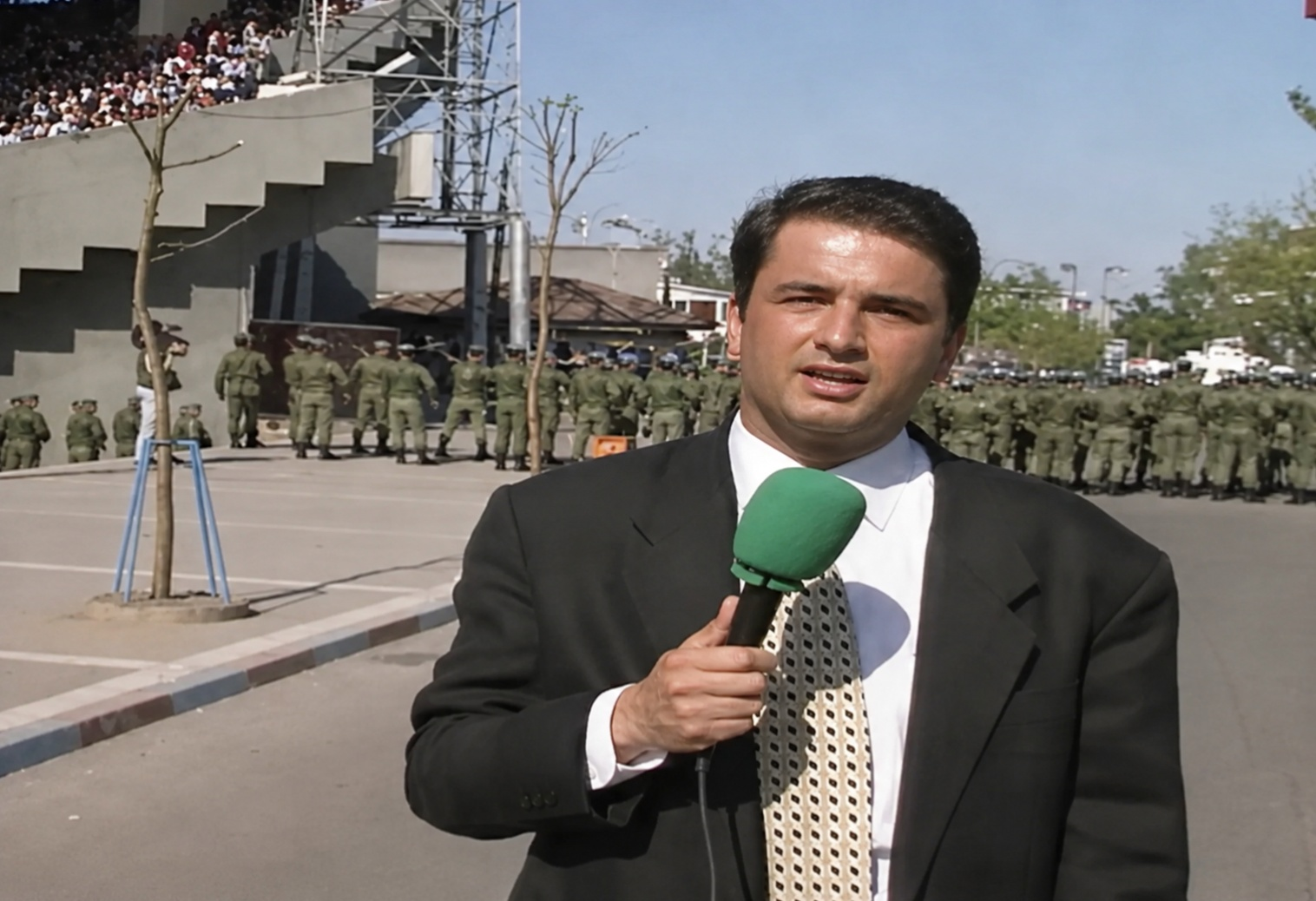
Acun Ilıcalı reporting during a Fenerbahçe–Trabzonspor football match in 1996.

His travel/entertainment program, Acun Firarda, which he prepared and presented himself by travelling to more than 100 countries, was particularly successful. He quickly became one of the most recognized names in Turkey, where his shows typically enjoyed very high ratings. Jennifer Şebnem Schaefer took part in the fashion-related parts of the program.

In 2004, Ilıcalı founded his own production company ACUNMEDYA. The company purchased the broadcasting rights to famous shows and adapted them for Turkish viewers. The shows included Deal or No Deal?, Fear Factor, Survivor, MasterChef, Got Talent, The Voice, Dancing with the Stars, Rising Star and Ninja Warrior, all of which were broadcast on popular prime-time slots.

In 2016, Ilıcalı produced projects in Greece, marking his first foray into the international media sector. ACUNMEDYA produced a number of television programs in Greece, including The Voice, Survivor, Got Talent and My Style Rocks for broadcast on Skai TV. The programs had ratings of 70% and were some of the most-viewed programs in Greek television history.

As a result of its successes in Greece, ACUNMEDYA developed a format bringing sports and reality programming together for the first time. Exatlon, a new reality sports competition program, began broadcasting in 2017 to an international audience in a number of countries, including USA, Mexico, Romania, Slovenia, Colombia, Brazil, Germany, and Hungary. At the 2017 Brazil edition, presented by the local host Luís Ernesto Lacombe, Ilıcalı and some partners menaced the local presenter hours before the grand final and took the stage himself. Exatlon currently remains among the most highly viewed programs in the countries in which it is broadcast. Following the success of Exatlon, Ilıcalı concluded an agreement with Ricardo Salinas, owner of Mexico's largest media group, for the production of television content for a three-year period. These productions are currently being broadcast in both daytime and evening slots on Azteca Uno, Mexico's most popular television channel.

Today, through the formats he has developed and the global program rights he has purchased, ACUNMEDYA produces content on four continents and in more than 10 countries.

ACUNMEDYA also launched Exxen a digital broadcasting platform that focused on family-oriented content. Exxen has more than one million subscribers. Exxen has acquired broadcasting rights for UEFA Champions League, UEFA Europa League and UEFA Europa Conference League. These organizations have been broadcast in Turkey for three seasons on Exxen.

Since 2008, Ilıcalı has been one of Turkey's top 100 largest taxpayers.

== Sports teams ==
In 2020, Ilıcalı purchased a partnership in Dutch football team Fortuna Sittard in the Eredivisie League. In 2021, he ended his partnership with the team.

In 2022, Ilıcalı's company ACUNMEDYA purchased the English football team Hull City from Assem Allam.

On 9 June 2023, Shelbourne announced on their website that Ilıcalı had purchased a stake in the club to become a majority shareholder. But he relinquished control in November 2023.

In June 2024, Ilıcalı joined the board of directors of Fenerbahçe under club president Ali Koç and served as the vice-president. He resigned from the position in June 2025.

On 23 May 2026, during his ownership of Hull City, the club defeated Middlesbrough 1–0 in the EFL Championship play-off final at Wembley Stadium, securing promotion to the Premier League for the first time in nine years.

== Personal life ==
Ilıcalı has been married four times and has four daughters. In 1989, he married Seda Başbuğ with whom he has a daughter. Ilicali and Başbuğ divorced in 1993 which, according to Ilıcalı, was due to the depression and inactivity after his parents death leading her to believe "there would be nothing from me and [so she] wanted a divorce". On 4th September 2024 he married Ayça Çağla Altunkaya.

In a 2023 interview, Ilıcalı revealed that during his youth, he became involved with the controversial figure Adnan Oktar. At the age of 19, while attending Istanbul University, Ilıcalı was briefly part of Oktar's circle. He described this period as a challenging and regrettable time in his life. Ilıcalı emphasized that he eventually distanced himself from Oktar’s influence after realizing the manipulative nature of the group. He referred to this experience as a significant life lesson, stating that he was misled during a vulnerable period but managed to break free from Oktar's influence.

== Legal issues ==
In 2024, Acun Ilıcalı faced a lawsuit filed by a former contestant of the reality show Survivor. The contestant claimed that Ilıcalı forced them to participate in the competition despite being injured, leading to further damage to their health. The lawsuit, amounting to 3.5 million Turkish lira, alleged that the contestant was pressured to perform while injured, sparking debate on the treatment of participants in reality TV shows.

Business positions
| Preceded by Assem Allam | Hull City chairman 2022– | Succeeded by Incumbent |
