= Acun Medya =

Turkish media company

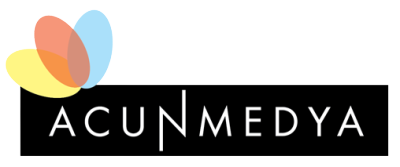
- Founded: 27 September 2003
- Founder: Acun Ilıcalı
- Headquarters: Beşiktaş, Istanbul,
- Website: www.acunmedya.com

Acun Medya (stylised as ACUNMEDYA) is a Turkish media company founded by Acun Ilıcalı, Esat Yöntunç, Çaykun Ertan, Alpay Kazan, Mustafa Kazan and Evren Çağlar on 27 September 2003. Acun Ilıcalı, who owns the company, is also the main host of most shows made by the company.

Acun Medya mainly produces competition programmes like Fear Factor, Survivor, Var Mısın Yok Musun, Yetenek Sizsiniz Türkiye, O Ses Türkiye and Exathlon. In addition to the programmes in Turkey, Acun Medya produces programmes in Greece, such as Survivor Greece, The Voice of Greece, Ellade Eheis Talento, Power of Love and The Masked Singer.

On 19 January 2022, Acun Medya acquired 100% ownership of English Football Club Hull City, who avoided relegation in their first season under Acun Medya's control.

== Assets ==
=== Streaming services ===
- 2021–: Exxen

=== TV channels ===
==== Active ====
- 2013–: TV8
- 2014–: TV8 int
- 2016–: TV8,5
- 2024–: 50% stake in Sport1

==== Closed ====
- MNG Shop (Bought form Mapa Group, closed in 2014, replaced by Shop90.)
- Shop90 (Replaced by TV8,5)

=== Programmes ===
==== Active ====
- Yetenek Sizsiniz Türkiye (2009–)
- O Ses Türkiye Rap (2021–)
- Masterchef Junior (2021–)
- Exatlon Türkiye (2020–)
- Doya Doya Moda (2019–)
- Sağlam Geziyoruz (2019–)
- Masterchef Turkey (2018–)
- Yemekteyiz (2017–)
- Survivor Panorama (2014–)
- O Ses Türkiye (2011–)
- Survivor Turkey (2005–)

==== Old ====
- Acun Firarda (2005)
- Fear Factor (2006–2007)
- Var mısın Yok musun (2007–2010)
- Yoksa Rüya mı? (2007)
- Söyle Söyleyebilirsen (2014)
- Yok Böyle Dans (2010–2011)
- Devler Ligi (2009)
- Survivor Turkey – Greece (2006)
- Survivor Aslanlar – Kanaryalar (2007)
- Survivor Males – Females (2010)
- Survivor Ünlüler – Gönüllüler (2011–2014)
- 3 Adam (2013–2017)
- Arda'nın Mutfağı (2014–2018)
- Aileler Yarışıyor (2014)
- Hülya Avşar Show (2014)
- Akademi (2014)
- Kel Alaka (2014)
- Para Bende (2014)
- Ninja Warrior Türkiye (2014)
- Ütopya (2014–2015)
- Ver Fırına (2014–2015)
- İşte Benim Stilim
- Komedi Türkiye (2015)
- En Zayıf Halka (2015)
- Rising Star Türkiye (2015–2016)
- 4 Büyükler Salon Turnuvası (2016)
- Göz6 (2016)
- Eser Yenenler Show (2018–2020)
