= Matty Fryatt =

English footballer (born 1986)

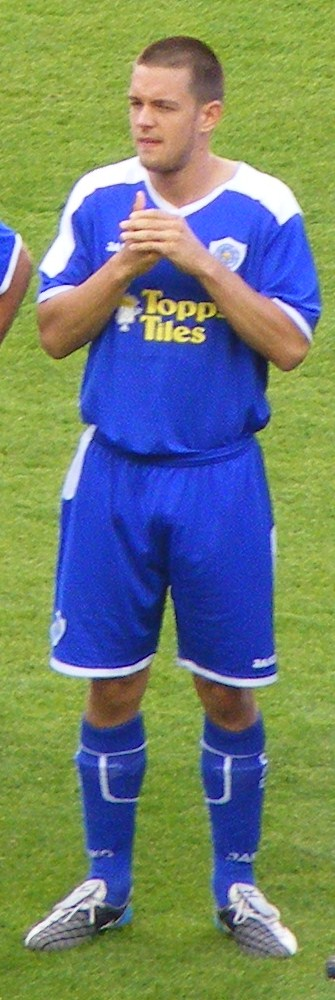
- Fryatt lining up for Leicester City in 2008

Personal information
- Full name: Matthew Charles Fryatt
- Date of birth: 5 March 1986 (age 40)
- Place of birth: Nuneaton, Warwickshire, England
- Height: 5 ft 10 in (1.78 m)
- Position: Striker

Youth career
- –2003: Walsall

Senior career*
Years	Team	Apps	(Gls)
2003–2006	Walsall	70	(27)
2003–2004	→ Carlisle United (loan)	10	(1)
2006–2011	Leicester City	168	(51)
2011–2014	Hull City	82	(27)
2013	→ Sheffield Wednesday (loan)	9	(4)
2014–2017	Nottingham Forest	25	(6)
Total		364	(116)

International career
2004–2005	England U19	6	(4)
- * Club domestic league appearances and goals

Matthew Charles Fryatt (born 5 March 1986) is an English football coach and former professional footballer, who played as a striker.

Fryatt holds the record for fastest goal ever scored by a Leicester City player when he scored after 9 seconds in a 2–1 defeat by Preston North End on 15 April 2006. He broke two further records during his time at Leicester in the 2008–09 season: firstly, becoming the first player in 42 years to score 20 goals before Christmas, and secondly, being the first in 83 years to hit hat-tricks in successive matches.

== Club career ==
=== Walsall ===
Born in Nuneaton, Warwickshire, Fryatt rose through the ranks at youth level at Walsall. He made his first team debut as a substitute in a 3–1 League Cup second round defeat to Bolton Wanderers at the Reebok Stadium on 24 September 2003, replacing Steve Corica after 67 minutes. His first appearance in The Football League came on 14 October, starting in a 1–1 away draw against Watford in the First Division.

On 18 December 2003, Fryatt moved to Third Division Carlisle United on loan for a month to gain vital first team experience. He made his debut for the Cumbrians two days later, starting in a 2–0 win over Torquay United at Brunton Park, and scored his first professional goal on 3 January 2004, the winner as his team came from behind to win 2–1 against Boston United, heading in Brendan McGill's cross for the bottom-ranked club. Twelve days later, Fryatt's loan was extended by another month, and he returned to Walsall on 23 February after playing ten games. On 20 March, he scored his first goal for the Saddlers, in the first two minutes of a 2–1 win at Preston North End, but the season ended with relegation to League One.

Fryatt began the 2004–05 season with a 12th-minute penalty to open a 3–2 win over West Midlands neighbours Port Vale on 7 August. A week later he netted two – including another penalty – in a 5–3 loss at Oldham Athletic. He scored 15 goals in 36 appearances across the season, including a hat-trick in a 4–3 win over Huddersfield Town on 29 January 2005, being assisted on the winner by player-manager Paul Merson. On 12 March, he scored within seven seconds of the start of a home match against AFC Bournemouth, who won 2–1 nonetheless. He also collected the goal of the season and the player of the season awards at Walsall at the end of the season.

Nottingham Forest made a £850,000 offer for him on 17 August 2005, which was rejected by Walsall because it was "derisory." On 24 August, Merson believed Birmingham City and Sunderland would bid for Fryatt. Despite signing a 12-month extension to his existing contract on 27 September, Fryatt was told by the club they would not block a transfer to a bigger club. On 13 December 2005, Fryatt said he expected to be sold by the end of the 2005–06 season. A concrete offer was made by Danish club Odense Boldklub, which was managed by Bruce Rioch, but Fryatt had no intention of moving to Denmark. He scored 18 goals in his final season at Walsall.

=== Leicester City ===
Fryatt signed a three-and-a-half-year deal with Leicester City for an undisclosed fee on 9 January 2006, while Walsall would receive a share of the profit should he be sold in future. He was handed the number 12 shirt, which he also wore at Walsall. He made his debut in a 2–1 defeat to Sheffield Wednesday on 14 January, scoring his first goal in a 2–1 defeat to Cardiff City on 21 January. On 6 February 2006, Fryatt admitted he was a bit shocked when manager Craig Levein was sacked within 16 days of his arrival, after a run of poor results. Nonetheless, he still believed he made the right move from Walsall, even if Leicester suffer relegation. He also pleaded to the board of directors to allow caretaker boss Rob Kelly to remain as manager until the end of the season. Fryatt scored a total of six league goals, helping Leicester avoid relegation. He ended their last home game of the season with a 1–0 win over Plymouth Argyle on 22 April.

Fryatt was picked by the BBC as Leicester's key player for the 2006–07 season, remarking that he "has the attitude and talent to play in the Premiership". However, he was plagued with injuries during that season, suffering an ankle injury in October 2006 which sidelined him for over two weeks. Fryatt was further frustrated by a foot problem during the second half of the season, forcing him to use an insole in his boots to take some pressure away from his ankle. Despite playing 34 competitive games, he scored only four goals, one of them in a 4–3 FA Cup defeat by Fulham. Fryatt nonetheless attracted interest from Wolves in July 2007, whose £2 million bid was turned down by then-manager Martin Allen because "the offer was nowhere near high enough."

His form worsened in the 2007–08 season, scoring only two goals in 30 league games and receiving one red card as Leicester were relegated from the Championship. One goal he did contribute however, gave Leicester a shock victory over Aston Villa in the League Cup on 26 September 2007. He was even the transfer loan target of Nottingham Forest, Leeds United and Crewe Alexandra.

==== 2008–09 season ====
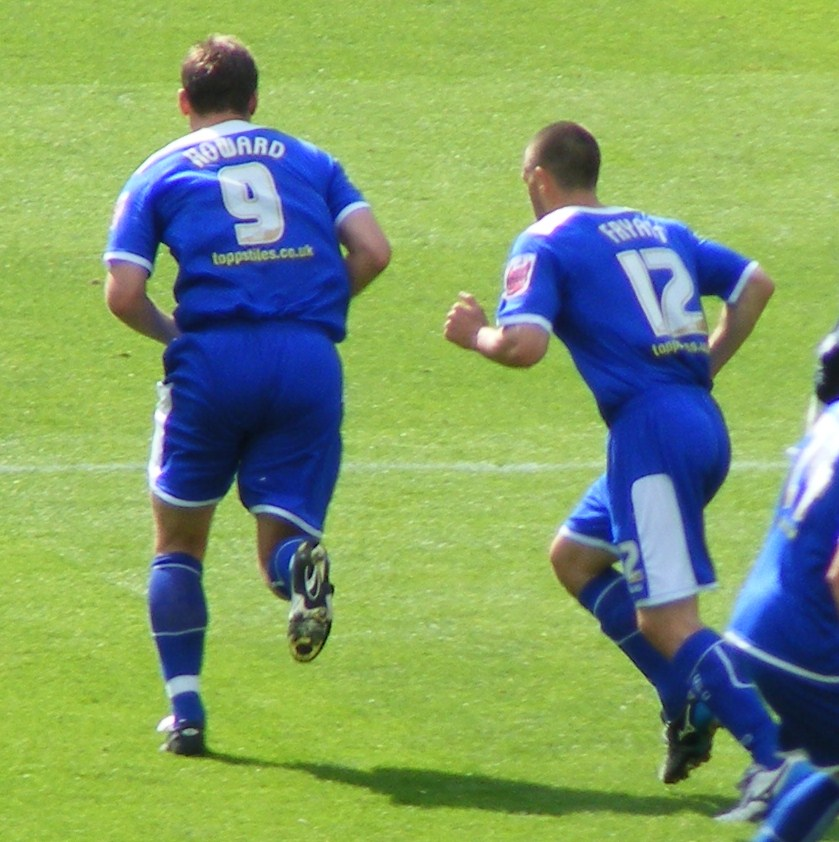
Steve Howard and Matty Fryatt playing for Leicester City on 13 September 2008

Fryatt made a positive start to the 2008–09 season, scoring five goals in four league games, earning him a nomination for League One player of the month for August. By November 2008, then-teammate Paul Dickov told Fryatt he thinks "he might have 20 goals by Christmas." He went on to score 20 goals before Christmas, the first Leicester player since Derek Dougan 42 years earlier to do so. On 29 November, he scored a hat-trick in a 3–2 FA Cup win over Dag & Red, and another against Southend on 6 December. In doing so he became the first Leicester player since Arthur Chandler 83 years earlier to hit hat-tricks in successive matches. Fryatt said he was having the best season of his career with the club on 13 January 2009.

Fryatt's superb form in the first half of the season attracted numerous transfer rumours in January 2009. Initially linked with a move to Crystal Palace, he was also wanted by Derby County and Preston North End. Paul Dickov felt Leicester should do everything possible to keep Fryatt, while chairman Milan Mandarić was hopeful he would commit himself to the club. Although Fryatt refused to comment on his future in November, he signed a new three-and-a-half-year deal on 23 December 2008.

He was awarded the League One player of the month for December on 13 January 2009, and the League One player of the year on 29 March. In February 2009, manager Nigel Pearson said he had total faith in Fryatt and no one, including fans should "doubt his ability." Fryatt went on to score his 30th and 31st goals against Southend on 18 April to secure the club's promotion as champions. He was named in the League One PFA Team of the Year together with teammates Jack Hobbs and Matt Oakley on 26 April 2009. At Leicester's end of season awards evening, Fryatt was voted by his teammates as players' player of the season, however he lost out to Steve Howard in the player of the season award and also to Andy King who won the young player of the year award. He ended the last game of the season by scoring his 32nd goal against Crewe on 2 May. Fryatt was also joint top scorer in the FA Cup that season with four goals.

==== 2009–10 season ====
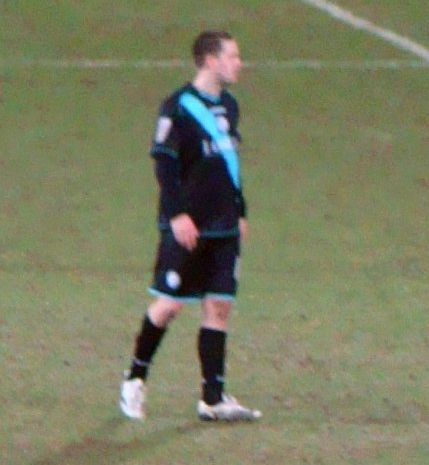
Fryatt on 23 January 2010, prior to the match in which he suffered a broken jaw.

The BBC Sport remarked on 6 August that Fryatt's "progress in the Championship could also be key to City's chances." He was strongly linked with a move to Hull City that month, which manager Nigel Pearson denied, saying he's "a very important member of our squad and we want to keep hold of our best players." Fryatt missed much of pre-season due to a hernia operation and leg infection. Nonetheless, he scored three goals in the opening five games of the 2009–10 season, equalling his tally during the club's doomed Championship campaign two seasons ago. Fryatt also helped Leicester to their first league win over Blackpool in 43 years on 12 September, scoring a match-winning double.

On 6 February 2010, Fryatt assisted Dyer's goal against Blackpool in a 2–1 win, helping Leicester to their first away victory at Bloomfield Road in 73 years. On 9 February however, he suffered a broken jaw after colliding with Brian Stock in a 0–0 draw against Doncaster Rovers, and was taken to a hospital in an ambulance. Ruled out for eight weeks, he had undergone surgery at Leicester Royal Infirmary, spending the night there before being transferred to a private hospital. He returned to action as a second-half substitute in a 2–0 win over Middlesbrough on 2 May 2010. He scored his last goal of the season against Cardiff City on 12 May, while Leicester lost the Championship play-off semi-final 4–3 on penalties. Fryatt finished the season as top goalscorer, just ahead of Martyn Waghorn with 13 goals.

=== Hull City ===
==== 2010–11 ====
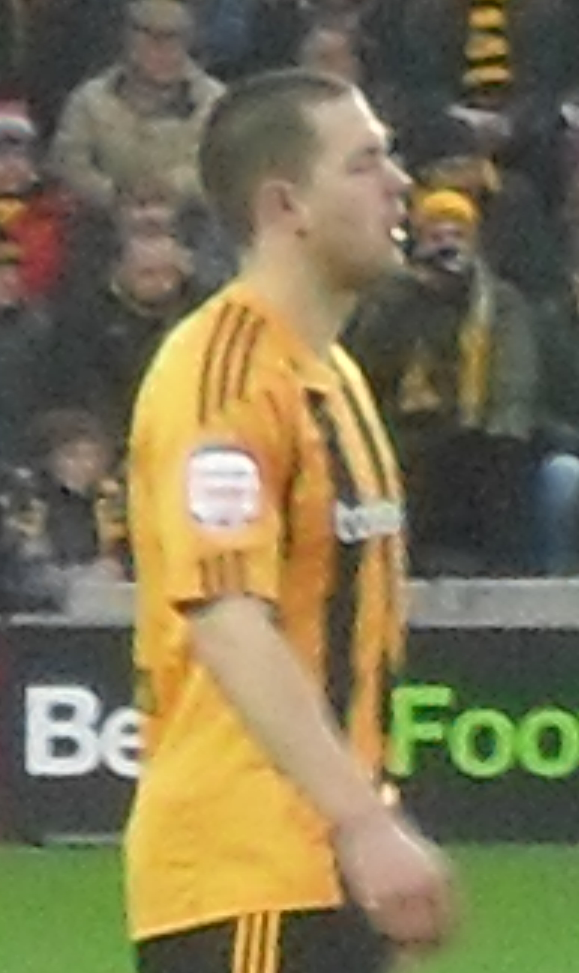
Fryatt playing for Hull City against QPR in 2011

He entered contract negotiations with Hull City in December 2010. It was reported in the national media on 30 December 2010 that a £1.2–million deal had been agreed for Fryatt to move to the KC Stadium, but that the deal would not be completed before Leicester City played Hull City on 1 January 2011. The £1.2 million deal was confirmed on Hull City's official website prior to the Leicester game. Fryatt made his debut as a substitute against Portsmouth on 3 January 2011. He scored on his debut coming off the bench to give the Tigers the lead. On 15 January, he scored his second goal, a penalty, in the 2–0 win over Barnsley at the KC Stadium. On 5 February 2011, in the Humber derby against Scunthorpe United, Fryatt scored a hat-trick, his first for Hull and the third of his career. On his 25th Birthday, Fryatt scored his 100th career league goal and his 7th since joining the club in the 1–0 victory over Nottingham Forest at the City Ground. On 16 April, he scored a brace against Doncaster Rovers at the KC Stadium.

==== 2011–12 ====
He scored his first goal of the 2011–12 season against Ipswich Town at Portman Road on 13 August 2011, resulting in a 1–0 win. On 1 October 2011 against Cardiff City at the KC Stadium, Fryatt exchanged passes with Martin Pusic down the left before carrying the ball into the box, dropping his shoulder to get past a defender and finishing low past David Marshall at the near post. On 22 October 2011 against Watford at the KC Stadium, an error in the Watford box left the ball loose for Fryatt to fire home from close range. On 1 November 2011 against Barnsley at the Oakwell Stadium, Dele Adebola chested the ball down nicely into the path of Fryatt and the striker fired home into the bottom corner from the edge of the area. On 19 November 2011, against Derby County at Pride Park, Liam Rosenior advanced from right back all the way to the edge of the Derby box before feeding Matty Fryatt. He had beaten the offside trap and finished confidently past Frank Fielding. On 26 November 2011, against Burnley at the KC Stadium, Cameron Stewart received the ball tight to the left touchline, beat Kieran Trippier for skill and pace before crossing low for Matty Fryatt to finish from close range at the near post. A break-away started by Paul McKenna, passed through Robert Koren and fed to Fryatt resulted in the striker blasting home his second goal of the game, although Grant in the Burnley goal will surely have been disappointed with his attempts to keep the shot out. On 3 December 2011, against Leicester City at the KC Stadium, Cameron Stewart's persistence allowed him to poke a ball through to Aaron Mclean and although he should have got his shot away sooner, it didn't matter as he was brought down by Leicester captain Matt Mills. The referee pointed to the spot and the defender was promptly sent off. Fryatt stepped up to take the penalty and confidently beat Kasper Schmeichel. On 17 April 2012, Fryatt got his second hat-trick for the Tigers in the 3–1 home victory over Barnsley, the fourth in his overall career.

==== 2012–13 ====
During Hull's opening fixture in the League Cup against Rotherham United, Fryatt picked up a serious Achilles injury. A series of injections were used to try and speed up the healing process, but these proved unsuccessful. It was later confirmed that Fryatt's season was over and he was looking to be fit for the following pre-season. On 21 March, Hull City manager Steve Bruce told the Hull Daily Mail that Fryatt could make a return to action in the middle of April, just in time for the final games of the season. He made his return on 13 April coming on as a substitute in the 89th minute against Ipswich Town. Hull City won the game 2–1. Fryatt made another cameo appearance in the following game at Molineux, before starting the next two games.

==== Loan to Sheffield Wednesday ====
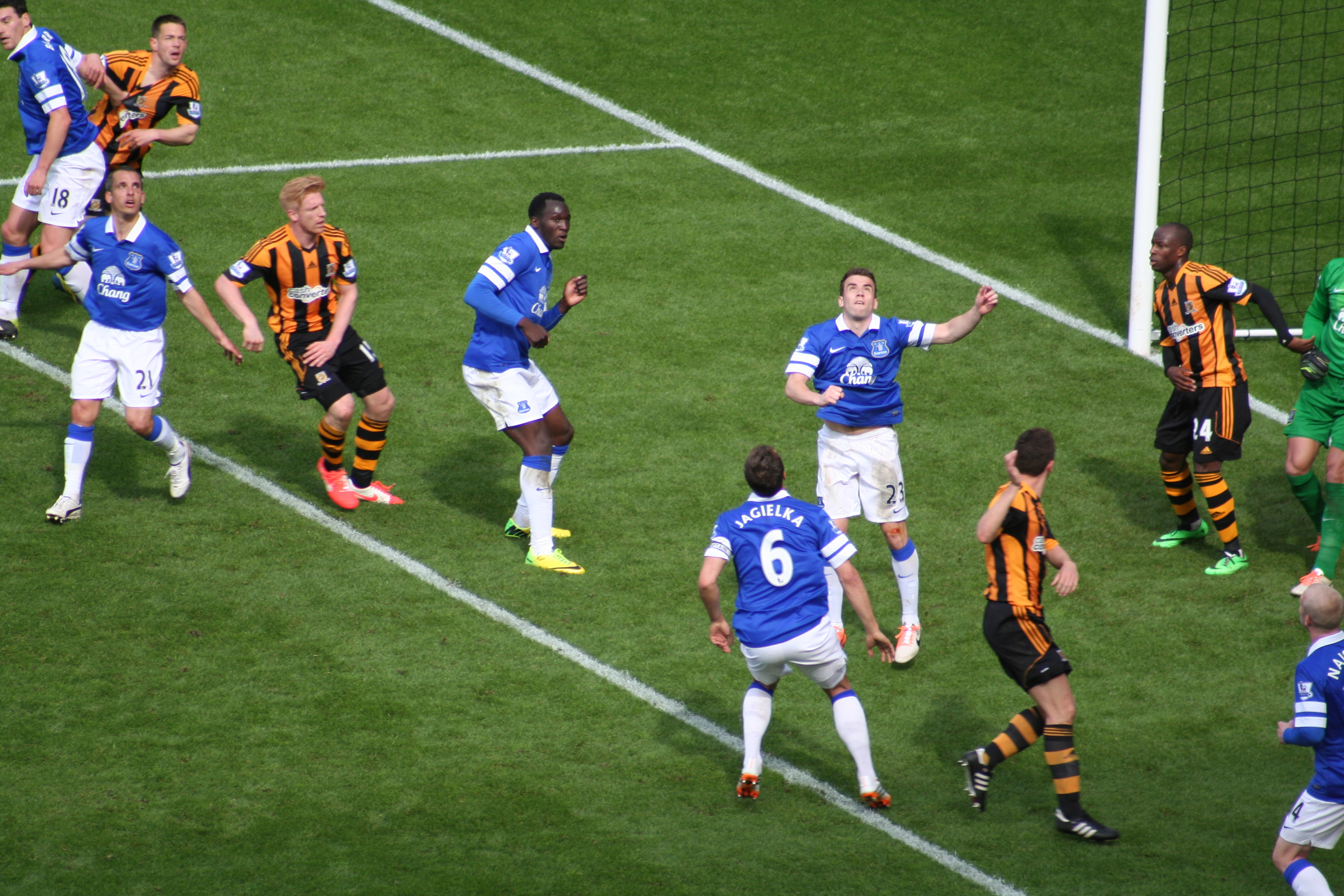
Fryatt (furthest left wearing stripes) on the last day of the 2013–14 Premier League season, facing Everton. Less than a month later, he would sign for Nottingham Forest.

On 27 September 2013, Fryatt joined Sheffield Wednesday on a 28-day emergency loan. Fryatt's first goal for the Owls came at Brighton & Hove Albion, when he took a right-footed shot from the centre of the box to beat Tomasz Kuszczak. Fryatt's second goal was an equalising volley in the 1–1 draw at Barnsley, his fifth and final appearance during his loan. On 29 October, Fryatt's loan was extended for a second month until 30 November. Fryatt celebrated his loan extension with a brace at home to Reading on 2 November.

==== 2013–14 season ====
On 28 December 2013, Fryatt scored his first Premier League goal, in a 6–0 home win against Fulham.

On 13 April 2014, he scored Hull's second goal in their 5–3 FA Cup semi-final win against Sheffield United at Wembley Stadium. On 17 May 2014, he started in the 2014 FA Cup Final against Arsenal.

=== Nottingham Forest ===
On 9 June 2014, Fryatt signed for Nottingham Forest on a three-year deal. Fryatt scored his first goal in the club's third game against Bournemouth on 19 August 2014.

Fryatt was released by Forest at the end of the 2016–17 season, having not played a game for the club for over two years due to injury.

Fryatt retired from football on 8 February 2018, due to a long-standing Achilles injury. In June 2020, it was announced that Fryatt was suing Nottingham Forest, claiming that his career was ended prematurely due to negligence by the club in treating his injury.

In December 2020, Nottingham Forest Football Club confirmed that the legal claim brought by Fryatt and his solicitor, Barrington Atkins, had been amicably settled.

== International career ==
Fryatt made his debut for the England U19 team on 9 September 2004 against Republic of Ireland, coming on as a half-time substitute and assisting a goal in a 2–0 win. He went on to star in the 2005 UEFA European Under-19 Football Championship, scoring four goals in five games, including a hat-trick against Serbia and Montenegro.

== Coaching career ==
Fryatt is currently coaching the U15 team at Walsall.

== Career statistics ==
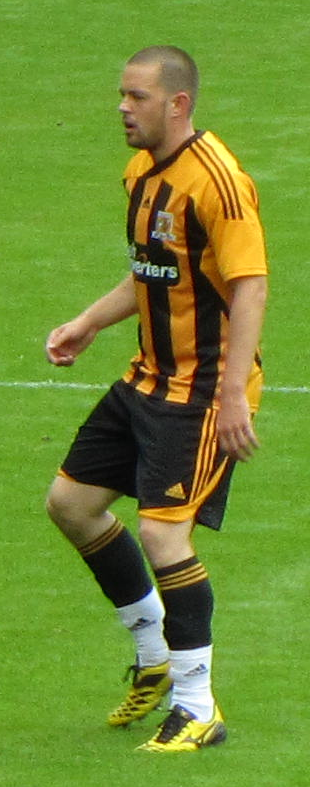
Fryatt playing for Hull in 2011

As of 9 May 2016

Appearances and goals by club, season and competition
Season	Club	League			FA Cup		League Cup		Other (Note: Includes Football League Trophy and the Football League play-offs.)		Total	
Season	Club	Division	Apps	Goals	Apps	Goals	Apps	Goals	Apps	Goals	Apps	Goals
Walsall	2003–04	First Division	11	1	0	0	1	0	—		12	1
Walsall	2004–05	League One	36	15	1	0	0	0	2	0	39	15
Walsall	2005–06	League One	23	11	2	2	0	0	2	1	27	14
Walsall	Total		70	27	3	2	1	0	4	1	78	30
Carlisle United (loan)	2003–04	Third Division	10	1	0	0	0	0	0	0	10	1
Leicester City	2005–06	Championship	19	6	0	0	0	0	—		19	6
Leicester City	2006–07	Championship	32	3	2	1	0	0	—		34	4
Leicester City	2007–08	Championship	30	2	1	0	4	1	—		35	3
Leicester City	2008–09	League One	46	27	2	4	1	0	3	1	52	32
Leicester City	2009–10	Championship	29	11	2	0	2	1	2	1	35	13
Leicester City	2010–11	Championship	12	2	0	0	2	2	—		14	4
Leicester City	Total		168	51	7	5	9	4	5	2	189	62
Hull City	2010–11	Championship	22	9	1	0	0	0	—		23	9
Hull City	2011–12	Championship	46	16	1	0	1	0	—		48	16
Hull City	2012–13	Championship	4	0	0	0	1	0	—		5	0
Hull City	2013–14	Premier League	10	2	6	4	2	0	—		18	6
Hull City	Total		82	27	8	4	4	0	—		94	31
Sheffield Wednesday (loan)	2013–14	Championship	9	4	0	0	0	0	—		9	4
Nottingham Forest	2014–15	Championship	25	6	0	0	1	0	—		26	6
Nottingham Forest	2015–16	Championship	0	0	0	0	0	0	—		0	0
Nottingham Forest	2016–17	Championship	0	0	0	0	0	0	—		0	0
Nottingham Forest	Total		25	6	0	0	1	0	—		26	6
Career total			364	114	18	11	15	4	9	3	406	134

== Honours ==
Leicester City

- Football League One: 2008–09

Hull City

- Football League Championship runner-up: 2012–13
- FA Cup runner-up: 2013–14

Individual

- Walsall Player of the Year: 2004–05
- Football League One Player of the Year: 2008–09
- PFA Team of the Year: 2008–09 League One
