= Liam Cooper =

Scotland international footballer (born 1991)

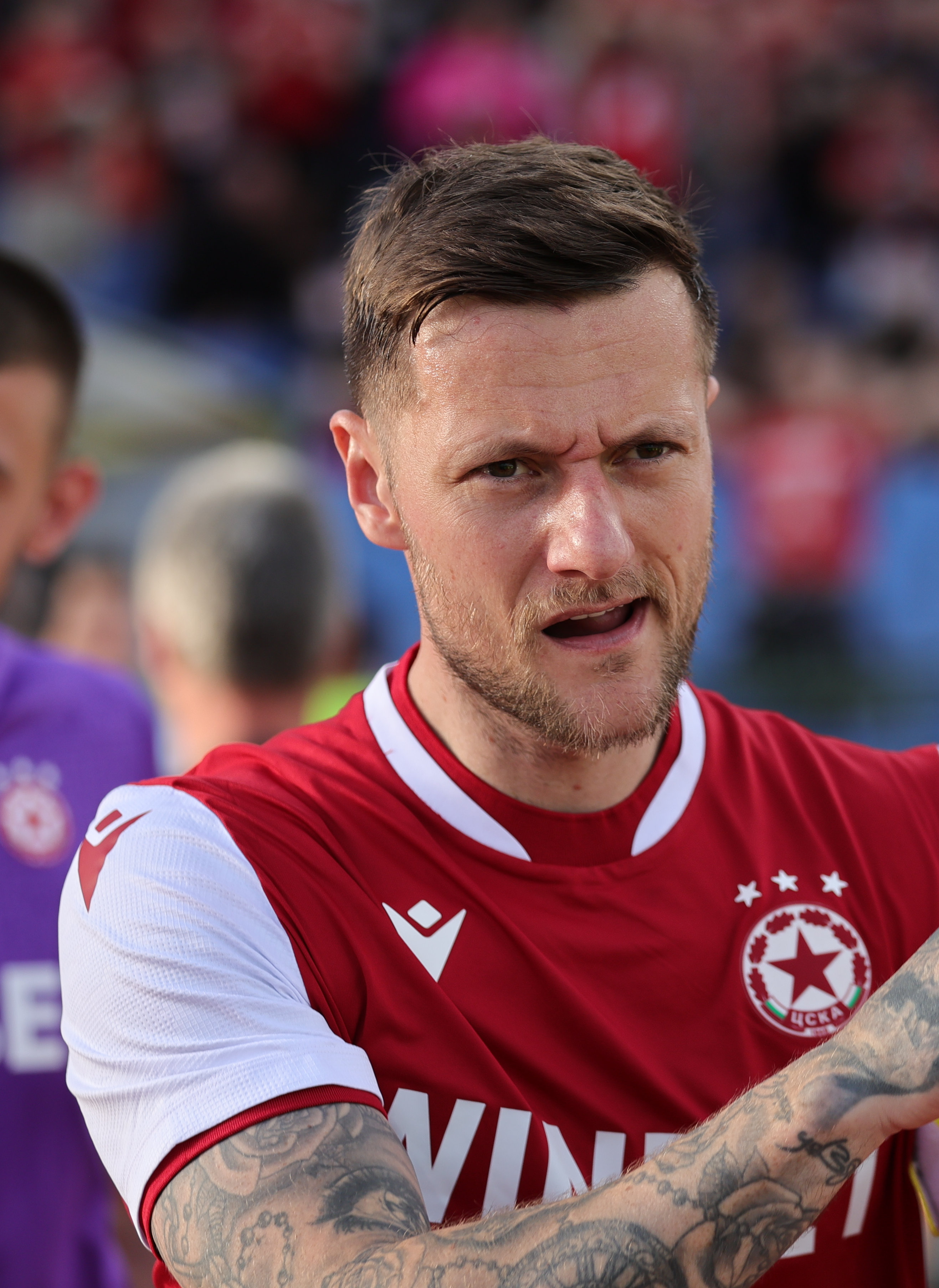
- Cooper with CSKA Sofia in 2025

Personal information
- Full name: Liam David Ian Cooper
- Date of birth: 30 August 1991 (age 35)
- Place of birth: Kingston upon Hull, England
- Height: 6 ft 1 in (1.86 m)
- Position: Centre-back

Team information
- Current team: Sheffield Wednesday
- Number: 6

Youth career
- 2002–2008: Hull City

Senior career*
Years	Team	Apps	(Gls)
2008–2013	Hull City	11	(0)
2011	→ Carlisle United (loan)	7	(1)
2011	→ Huddersfield Town (loan)	4	(0)
2012–2013	→ Chesterfield (loan)	10	(1)
2013–2014	Chesterfield	61	(4)
2014–2024	Leeds United	262	(11)
2024–2025	CSKA Sofia	23	(1)
2025–	Sheffield Wednesday	27	(1)

International career
2008	Scotland U17	5	(0)
2009	Scotland U19	1	(0)
2016–2024	Scotland	19	(0)
- * Club domestic league appearances and goals as of 21:57, 20 November 2026 (UTC)

Liam David Ian Cooper (born 30 August 1991) is a professional footballer who plays as a centre-back for EFL League One club Sheffield Wednesday. Born in England, he played for the Scotland national team.

Cooper came through the youth academy at Hull City before making his debut with the first team at the age of 16. He spent time on loan at Carlisle United and Huddersfield Town, before moving to Chesterfield in 2012. He won promotion to League One with the Spireites in 2014 before joining Leeds United later that year. He played over 200 games for the Yorkshire club, captaining them to promotion to the Premier League in 2020.

Cooper made his senior debut for the Scotland national team in 2019, having previously played for the under-17s and under-19s during his time at Hull City. He represented the side at UEFA Euro 2020 and UEFA Euro 2024.

== Early and personal life ==
Cooper was born in Kingston upon Hull and attended Malet Lambert school. His paternal grandfather John hailed from Bo'ness, Scotland. His father David and brother Joe work on the Pilot boats on the Humber Estuary.

Growing up, his father was a West Ham United fan and would take him to games, while the rest of his family were Hull City supporters. Liam, however, supported Leeds United.

In March 2020, Cooper opened his own Football Academy for youngsters aged 4–14.

== Club career ==
=== Hull City ===
Cooper joined his hometown club Hull City in 2002 at under-12 level. He was in the youth team that won the Football League Youth Alliance Cup Final against Colchester 3–0, scoring the opening goal but later being sent off for a deliberate handball.

During the 2007–08 season, he was given the number 37 shirt but failed to make any appearances as the Tigers went on to win promotion to the Premier League for the first time in their history. He made his debut as 16-year-old for the club against Swansea City in the League Cup on 26 August 2008 and featured as an unused substitute in their Premier League defeat to Wigan Athletic four days later after signing his first professional contract. A year later, he would make his first Premier League start on 26 September 2009 at Anfield in a 6–1 defeat to Liverpool.

Over the following three years, Cooper would find his opportunities limited at Hull and spent brief periods out on loan at Carlisle United and Huddersfield Town in 2011. He briefly returned to the first team under Nick Barmby to form a solid partnership with James Chester in March 2012 for the rest of the season following an injury to Jack Hobbs. When Barmby departed for Steve Bruce in the summer of 2012, he was replaced by the new manager's son Alex.

=== Chesterfield ===
Cooper joined League Two side Chesterfield in November 2012. He made his debut in a 6–1 win over Hartlepool United in the FA Cup, and scored on his league debut two weeks later in a 2–1 victory over Oxford United. The 2012–13 season was Cooper's first year of playing regular professional football, making 31 appearances in all competitions as the Spireites narrowly missed out on a play–off spot.

The 2013–14 would prove to be a memorable campaign for both Cooper and Chesterfield under manager Paul Cook. The club reached the 2014 Football League Trophy Final and played at Wembley Stadium, but ultimately lost 3–1 to Peterborough United in front of more than 35,000 fans. In the league, Cooper formed a formidable partnership with Ian Evatt as the team won the division and were promoted to League One. At the end of the season, Cooper was named in the PFA Team of the Year along with three other Chesterfield players.

=== Leeds United ===
==== Early years and captaincy ====
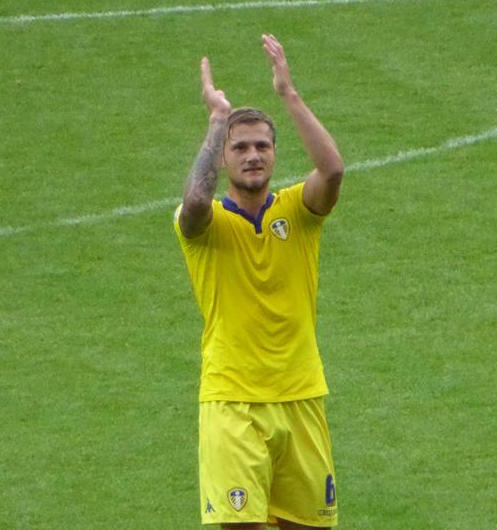
Cooper during the 2015–16 season

Cooper came to the attention of Leeds United after impressing sporting director Nicola Salerno in a 2–2 preseason draw at the b2net Stadium in the summer of 2014. After weeks of negotiations, Leeds agreed a deal for £600,000 plus add-ons relating to appearances, a future sale and promotion; with Cooper joining the club on 13 August. (After winning promotion to the Premier League in 2020, the Spireites received an additional £150,000 from the sale.)

He made his debut three days later at home to Middlesbrough in a 1–0 win, before being made club captain by Neil Redfearn midway through his first season. He would struggle for consistency under a succession of managers, losing his starting place to Sol Bamba and later to Pontus Jansson, but would still go on to make over 100 appearances during his first four seasons with the club. During a period of 30 games between 2017 and 2018, Cooper was sent off three times and received another six game ban for a stamp on Reading defender Reece Oxford. His propensity to be a liability in games earned him the disparaging nickname 'League One Liam' among Leeds fans at the time, but Cooper remained a highly respected captain amongst his teammates. He kept hold of the captaincy during Thomas Christiansen and Paul Heckingbottom's time as manager in the 2017–18 campaign, who would be his 7th and 8th manager respectively at the club in less than four years.

==== Bielsa and promotion ====
Cooper retained the captaincy after the shock appointment of the world renowned Marcelo Bielsa as Head Coach in the summer of 2018. In Bielsa's first game, he scored the third goal in a comprehensive 3–1 victory over promotion favourites Stoke City, as Leeds ascended to the top of the Championship by Christmas. Leeds would eventually lose out on automatic promotion to Norwich City and Sheffield United as their form dipped in the second half of the 2018–2019 campaign, before losing 4–3 on aggregate to Derby County in the play-offs. In spite of a disappointing end to a season that had long looked so promising, Cooper was widely perceived to be one of the most improved players in the team under the new head coach, and was included in the EFL Championship Team of the Season, EFL Team of the Season, as well at the PFA's Championship Team of the Season with teammates Pontus Jansson and Pablo Hernández.

The 2019–2020 marked Leeds' centenary year and Cooper's sixth season with the club. He would sign a new five-year deal with the club in September, and would be present at The Best FIFA Football Awards 2019 to collect the FIFA Fair Play Award on behalf of Bielsa and the Leeds United team for allowing Aston Villa to score an uncontested goal in the previous season. On the pitch, the team's nine–point lead at Christmas in the automatic promotion zone was completely eroded by the beginning of February after a run of four defeats in five games. With questions again being asked of Leeds' ability to maintain the form over the course of a full season, Cooper would score a crucial equaliser in a 1–1 draw in the following game against promotion rivals Brentford. It would later transpire that Cooper's son had been in hospital for three days prior to the game and there were doubts over whether he would play at all. The result proved to be a catalyst for the Yorkshire club's season, as they went on to win their next five games with Cooper being part of a defence that would also keep five clean sheets, taking the team back to the summit of the table and reestablishing a seven–point lead in the automatic promotion places. The momentum building around the club with only nine games remaining would be halted six days later when the season was suspended due to the COVID-19 pandemic.

The season would resume behind closed doors three months later in June, with Leeds' five match winning run coming to an immediate end with a 2–0 defeat to Cardiff City. Leeds would only drop two further points from the remaining eight games, as Leeds secured promotion to the Premier League on 17 July after West Yorkshire rivals Huddersfield Town beat West Bromwich Albion 2–1, and won the Championship title the following day after Brentford failed to beat Stoke City. Cooper became the first Leeds United captain to win promotion since Gordon Strachan in 1990 and lifted the Championship title on 22 July after a 4–0 win over Charlton Athletic on the final day of the season, immortalising himself in the club's history. He would also retain his place in the PFA Team of the Year.

==== Premier League ====
Cooper missed Leeds' first Premier League game for 16 years in a 4–3 away defeat to Liverpool on the opening day of the season after picking up an injury. In the following match, he made his first Premier League start since September 2009 in a 4–3 win over Fulham. The period between stands at 10 years, 359 days was a league record for the greatest length of time between starts. The following game against Sheffield United also marked his 200th appearance with the club and the first player to reach that number of games since Luciano Becchio in 2012. Cooper joins a select group of just 70 players that have made over 200 appearances for the club, including teammate Stuart Dallas who also hit the milestone later in that season.

==== Return to the Championship ====
On 6 August 2023, Cooper scored the team's first goal on the opening day of Leeds' 2023–24 Championship league campaign, a 2–2 home draw with Cardiff City, injuring his knee in the process, which kept him out of the team until his 20 September return as a second-half substitute against Hull City.

On 11 September 2024, Cooper left Leeds permanently, ending his 10-year stay with the club as captain.

=== CSKA Sofia ===
On the same day, Cooper moved to Bulgaria, signing for Bulgarian First League club CSKA Sofia.

=== Sheffield Wednesday ===
On 17 November 2025, Cooper returned to England, joining Championship side Sheffield Wednesday on a free transfer running until the end of the season. He made his debut the following weekend on 23 November in the Steel City derby against local rivals Sheffield United, where he came on as a first half substitute for teammate Dominic Iorfa, which later saw the Owls lose 0–3 to the latter. He scored his first goal for Wednesday on 21 December, rifling home a failed clearance from a free-kick against Ipswich Town. Following the end of the 2025–26 season, the club confirmed that they had offered him a new contract. In June 2026, he signed his new one-year contract keeping him at the club until the summer of 2027.

Cooper was voted the clubs player of the month for September 2026 after winning player of the match for three of the four games.

== International career ==
Cooper was eligible to represent England, having been born in Kingston upon Hull, and Scotland through his paternal grandfather who was born in Bo'ness, West Lothian. During his time in the youth team at Hull City, he chose to represent Scotland and made his debut at under-17 level in March 2008, before going on to play for the under-19s in 2009.

Cooper received his first call-up to the senior Scotland squad on 10 March 2016 for a friendly against Denmark, and made his debut for the squad in a 2–1 defeat to Russia on 6 September 2019. He began to feature frequently for Scotland in 2020 and played 120 minutes against Israel in the UEFA Euro 2020 play-off semi final, which Scotland won 5–3 on penalties after a 0–0 draw. A muscle injury meant that he would miss the final against Serbia, which Scotland again won on penalties to qualify for Euro 2020 – their first major tournament since France 98. Cooper started the first game of the tournament against the Czech Republic at Hampden Park, a 2–0 defeat for Scotland. Cooper was included in the 26-man squad for UEFA Euro 2024 hosted in Germany.

== Career statistics ==
=== Club ===
As of 20 November 2026

Appearances and goals by club, season and competition
Club	Season	League			National cup (Note: Includes FA Cup, Bulgarian Cup)		League cup (Note: Includes EFL Cup)		Other		Total	
Club	Season	Division	Apps	Goals	Apps	Goals	Apps	Goals	Apps	Goals	Apps	Goals
Hull City	2008–09	Premier League	0	0	0	0	1	0	0	0	1	0
Hull City	2009–10	Premier League	2	0	0	0	2	0	0	0	4	0
Hull City	2010–11	Championship	2	0	0	0	1	0	—		3	0
Hull City	2011–12	Championship	7	0	2	0	0	0	—		9	0
Hull City	Total		11	0	2	0	4	0	0	0	17	0
Carlisle United (loan)	2010–11	League One	6	1	0	0	0	0	1	0	7	1
Huddersfield Town (loan)	2011–12	League One	4	0	0	0	1	0	2	0	7	0
Chesterfield	2012–13	League Two	29	2	2	1	0	0	0	0	31	3
Chesterfield	2013–14	League Two	41	3	1	0	0	0	6	0	48	3
Chesterfield	2014–15	League One	1	0	0	0	0	0	0	0	1	0
Chesterfield	Total		71	5	3	1	0	0	6	0	80	6
Leeds United	2014–15	Championship	29	1	1	0	1	0	—		31	1
Leeds United	2015–16	Championship	39	1	1	0	1	0	—		41	1
Leeds United	2016–17	Championship	11	0	2	0	5	0	—		18	0
Leeds United	2017–18	Championship	30	1	1	0	1	0	—		32	1
Leeds United	2018–19	Championship	36	3	0	0	0	0	2	0	38	3
Leeds United	2019–20	Championship	38	2	0	0	0	0	—		38	2
Leeds United	2020–21	Premier League	25	1	1	0	0	0	—		26	1
Leeds United	2021–22	Premier League	21	0	0	0	1	0	—		21	0
Leeds United	2022–23	Premier League	18	1	0	0	1	0	—		19	1
Leeds United	2023–24	Championship	15	1	3	0	0	0	1	0	19	1
Leeds United	Total		262	11	9	0	10	0	3	0	284	11
CSKA Sofia	2024–25	Bulgarian First League	21	1	3	0	–		1	0	25	1
CSKA Sofia	2025–26	Bulgarian First League	2	0	0	0	–		0	0	2	0
CSKA Sofia	Total		23	1	3	0	0	0	1	0	27	1
Sheffield Wednesday	2025–26	Championship	14	1	0	0	—		—		14	1
Sheffield Wednesday	2026–27	League One	13	0	0	0	0	0	0	0	13	0
Sheffield Wednesday	Total		27	1	0	0	0	0	0	0	27	1
Career total			402	17	17	1	15	0	13	0	447	18

=== International ===
As of match played 3 June 2024

Appearances and goals by national team and year
National team	Year	Apps	Goals
Scotland	2019	2	0
Scotland	2020	3	0
Scotland	2021	8	0
Scotland	2022	1	0
Scotland	2023	3	0
Scotland	2024	2	0
Total		19	0

== Honours ==
Chesterfield

- Football League Two: 2013–14
- Football League Trophy runner-up: 2013–14

Leeds United

- EFL Championship: 2019–20

Individual

- PFA Team of the Year: 2013–14 League Two, 2018–19 Championship, 2019–20 Championship
- EFL Team of the Season: 2018–19
