= Corry Evans =

Northern Irish footballer (born 1990)

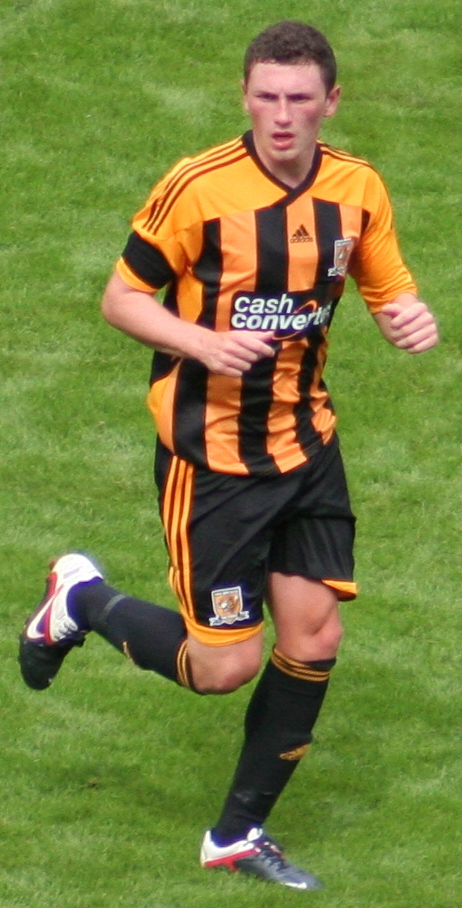
- Evans playing for Hull City in 2011

Personal information
- Full name: Corry John Evans
- Date of birth: 30 July 1990 (age 36)
- Place of birth: Belfast, Northern Ireland
- Height: 5 ft 11 in (1.80 m)
- Positions: Defensive midfielder; centre-back

Youth career
- Greenisland Boys
- 2005–2009: Manchester United

Senior career*
Years	Team	Apps	(Gls)
2009–2011	Manchester United	0	(0)
2010	→ Carlisle United (loan)	1	(0)
2011	→ Hull City (loan)	18	(3)
2011–2013	Hull City	75	(3)
2013–2021	Blackburn Rovers	206	(4)
2021–2024	Sunderland	60	(2)
2024–2025	Bradford City	6	(0)
2025	Oldham Athletic	6	(0)
Total		372	(12)

International career
2006–2007	Northern Ireland U16	3	(1)
2007	Northern Ireland U17	5	(0)
2007–2008	Northern Ireland U19	9	(0)
2008–2009	Northern Ireland U21	10	(0)
2009	Northern Ireland B	1	(0)
2009–2025	Northern Ireland	72	(2)
- * Club domestic league appearances and goals

Corry John Evans (born 30 July 1990) is a Northern Irish former professional footballer who played as a midfielder or centre-back.

A former Northern Ireland youth international, he came through the Manchester United youth academy. He was capable of operating in defense or central midfield. He is the younger brother of former footballer Jonny Evans.

== Club career ==
=== Early career ===
Born in Belfast, Evans began his career with Greenisland Boys FC, where fellow Manchester United youth players Craig Cathcart and Conor Devlin also played before moving to England. However, when Evans' brother, Jonny, was signed by Manchester United, their entire family moved to Manchester.

=== Manchester United ===
Evans then joined the Manchester United youth team, and originally played as a schoolboy until he signed a trainee contract with the club on his 16th birthday in July 2006. By then, he had already become a regular player in the club's Under-18 side, and he even made his debut for the reserve team on 31 October 2005, coming on as a substitute for Sam Hewson in a 5–1 away defeat by Oldham Athletic. He made 19 appearances and scored one goal for the Under 18s in 2006–07, but his next reserve team appearance did not come until November 2007, when he came on as a second-half substitute for David Gray in a 2–1 away win over Middlesbrough.

After five more appearances for the reserves in 2007–08, Evans established himself as a regular in the reserve team in 2008–09, and was even given the captain's armband at one point. However, despite having been deployed as a central midfielder throughout his earlier career, Evans found himself increasingly used as a centre-back during the 2008–09 season. Towards the end of the season, along with James Chester and Tom Cleverley, Evans was nominated by reserve team manager Ole Gunnar Solskjær for the Denzil Haroun Reserve Player of the Year award, but lost out to Chester.

Evans received his first call-up to the Manchester United first team on 24 May 2009, when he was named on the bench for the club's last game of the 2008–09 Premier League season against Hull City.

In July 2010, Evans was part of the United squad that toured North America. Although he was an unused substitute in the first match against Celtic, he came on as a substitute in the second half of the second game against Philadelphia Union, joining his brother Jonny on the pitch.

On 22 October 2010, he joined Carlisle United on a one-month loan deal.

=== Hull City ===
On 14 January 2011, he joined Hull City on loan. Making his debut on 22 January 2011, as a replacement for Cameron Stewart, and scoring in the 1–1 away draw against Reading. The move was made permanent following the close of the 2010–11 season.

He made his first appearance since joining City on a permanent deal starting against Ipswich Town on 13 August 2011 at Portman Road, with City winning 1–0. On 10 December 2011 against Coventry City at the Ricoh Arena, a neat move down the left resulted in Dawson sending over a high cross which dropped for Corry Evans, who controlled the ball before sending a low volley past Joe Murphy and into the bottom corner of the net.

On 29 December 2012, Evans scored the first goal in Hull's 2–0 victory over Leeds United, placing the ball into the bottom corner past Leeds goalkeeper Paddy Kenny.

=== Blackburn Rovers ===
After 97 appearances for Hull, Evans left to join Blackburn Rovers in August 2013. Despite a groin injury delaying his debut for the club, Evans passed a medical and signed a three-year contract. On 31 August 2013, Evans scored his first goal for the club with a superb volley from 25 yards. In November 2015, he signed a contract extension which would keep him in the club till 2019. He was injured in December 2016 in a match against Brighton and Hove Albion in December 2016 due to a recurring groin problem. As a result, he was substituted off in the second half. In March 2017, it was announced that he would be ruled out of action for the rest of the season as he would undergo a surgery for his groin problem.

Rovers announced that Evans would leave the club at the end of the 2020–21 season.

=== Sunderland ===
On 15 July 2021, Evans joined League One side Sunderland on a free transfer, signing a two-year deal with an option of an additional year. On 4 August, he was appointed club captain by manager Lee Johnson. He scored his first goal for the club on 5 February 2022 in a 2–1 loss to Doncaster Rovers.

On 17 May 2024, the club announced he would be released in the summer once his contract expired.

=== Bradford City ===
On 6 October 2024, Bradford announced Evans had signed on a short term deal at the League Two club. He departed the club in January 2025.

=== Oldham Athletic ===
On 15 January 2025, he signed for National League club Oldham Athletic on a contract until the end of the season. Evans made his debut for the Latics on 18 January 2025 in a 3–1 loss at home to Aldershot Town in which he came off injured at half time.

== International career ==
Evans began his international football career as a schoolboy international, playing for the Northern Ireland under-16 side; he scored one goal in three appearances for the team. In 2007, he progressed to the under-17 side, playing in five fixtures in the space of two months. However, the team went winless in those five matches, losing three and drawing the other two. By the end of 2007, Evans had joined the under-19 team, but they were just as the under-17s, losing four and winning just one of the six matches that Evans played in between October 2007 and October 2008. He made his debut for the under-21 side on 19 August 2008, but he was substituted after 72 minutes of the 1–0 defeat to Poland. He has since made four more appearances for the under-21s. Although the U21s failed to qualify for the Euro 2009, he was recalled for several Euro 2011 qualifiers.

Evans received his first call-up to the Northern Ireland senior team on 20 May 2009; he was named in a 19-man squad that contained nine other uncapped players for the match against Italy in Pisa on 6 June 2009. He made his debut in that very game, playing 78 minutes of the 3–0 defeat before being replaced by Shane Ferguson. On 3 September 2010, Evans scored his first international goal as he scored the winner with his first touch after coming on as a substitute in a 1–0 away win over Slovenia in the first UEFA Euro 2012 qualifying game.

Evans was included in the Northern Ireland squad for the 2016 UEFA Euro which took place in France. He was an unused substitute in its first match which saw Northern Ireland lose to Poland by a margin of 1–0. He played the whole of the country's last group stage match against Wales which produced a similar result due to which Northern Ireland was eliminated from the tournament.

During the first leg of a two-game playoff against Switzerland in the qualifying tournament for the 2018 FIFA World Cup in Russia, Evans was penalised for handball after a shot from close proximity from Xherdan Shaqiri went off his side, leading to a penalty kick that would be converted for what would ultimately prove the deciding score, both on the day and on aggregate. His brother Jonny compared the decision to Thierry Henry's handball against the Republic of Ireland in the 2010 qualification playoff.

== Career statistics ==
=== Club ===
Appearances and goals by club, season and competition
Club	Season	League			FA Cup		League Cup		Continental		Other		Total	
Club	Season	Division	Apps	Goals	Apps	Goals	Apps	Goals	Apps	Goals	Apps	Goals	Apps	Goals
Manchester United	2008–09	Premier League	0	0	0	0	0	0	0	0	0	0	0	0
Manchester United	2009–10	Premier League	0	0	0	0	0	0	0	0	0	0	0	0
Manchester United	2010–11	Premier League	0	0	0	0	0	0	0	0	0	0	0	0
Manchester United	Total		0	0	0	0	0	0	0	0	0	0	0	0
Carlisle United (loan)	2010–11	League One	1	0	0	0	—		—		0	0	1	0
Hull City (loan)	2010–11	Championship	18	3	—		—		—		—		18	3
Hull City	2011–12	Championship	43	2	2	0	0	0	—		—		45	2
Hull City	2012–13	Championship	32	1	1	0	1	0	—		—		34	1
Hull City	Total		75	3	3	0	1	0	—		—		79	3
Blackburn Rovers	2013–14	Championship	21	1	0	0	0	0	—		—		21	1
Blackburn Rovers	2014–15	Championship	38	1	3	0	0	0	—		—		41	1
Blackburn Rovers	2015–16	Championship	30	1	2	0	1	0	—		—		33	1
Blackburn Rovers	2016–17	Championship	19	0	0	0	0	0	—		—		19	0
Blackburn Rovers	2017–18	League One	32	0	3	0	1	1	—		0	0	36	1
Blackburn Rovers	2018–19	Championship	35	0	1	0	0	0	—		—		36	0
Blackburn Rovers	2019–20	Championship	13	1	0	0	2	0	—		—		15	1
Blackburn Rovers	2020–21	Championship	18	0	0	0	0	0	—		—		18	0
Blackburn Rovers	Total		206	4	9	0	4	1	—		0	0	219	5
Sunderland	2021–22	League One	33	2	1	0	3	0	—		3 (Note: Appearance(s) in League One play-offs)	0	40	2
Sunderland	2022–23	Championship	24	0	0	0	0	0	—		0	0	24	0
Sunderland	2023–24	Championship	3	0	0	0	0	0	—		—		3	0
Sunderland	Total		60	2	1	0	3	0	—		3	0	67	2
Bradford City	2024–25	League Two	6	0	1	0	—		—		2 (Note: Appearance(s) in EFL Trophy)	0	9	0
Oldham Athletic	2024–25	National League	6	0	—		—		—		3 (Note: Appearance(s) in National League play-offs)	0	9	0
Career total			372	12	14	0	8	1	0	0	8	0	402	13

=== International ===
Appearances and goals by national team and year
National team	Year	Apps	Goals
Northern Ireland	2009	1	0
Northern Ireland	2010	7	1
Northern Ireland	2011	7	0
Northern Ireland	2012	4	0
Northern Ireland	2013	3	0
Northern Ireland	2014	5	0
Northern Ireland	2015	6	0
Northern Ireland	2016	7	0
Northern Ireland	2017	5	0
Northern Ireland	2018	8	1
Northern Ireland	2019	7	0
Northern Ireland	2020	5	0
Northern Ireland	2021	4	0
Northern Ireland	2022	2	0
Northern Ireland	2024	2	0
Total		73	2

Scores and results list Northern Ireland's goal tally first, score column indicates score after each Evans goal.

List of international goals scored by Corry Evans
No.	Date	Venue	Opponent	Score	Result	Competition	Ref.
1	3 September 2010	Ljudski vrt, Maribor, Slovenia	Slovenia	1–0	1–0	UEFA Euro 2012 qualifying	
2	18 November 2018	Windsor Park, Belfast, Northern Ireland	Austria	1–1	1–2	2018–19 UEFA Nations League B	

== Honours ==
Blackburn Rovers

- EFL League One second-place promotion: 2017–18

Sunderland

- EFL League One play-offs: 2022

Oldham Athletic

- National League play-offs: 2025
