= 2011–12 Hull City A.F.C. season =

English football club season

Hull City
2011–12 season
- Chairman: Assem Allam
- Manager: Nigel Pearson (until 15 November 2011); Nick Barmby (caretaker; from 15 November 2011; initially permanent on 10 January 2012)
- Stadium: KC Stadium
- Championship: 8th
- FA Cup: Fourth round
- League Cup: First round
- Top goalscorer: League: Matty Fryatt (16); All: Matty Fryatt (16)
- Highest home attendance: 22,676 (6 March vs Leeds United)
- Lowest home attendance: 16,604 (17 April vs Barnsley)
- Average home league attendance: 18,790
Home colours	Away colours

The 2011–12 season is Hull City's second consecutive season back in the Championship after relegation from the Premier League in the 2009–10 season. They also competed in the League Cup and the FA Cup.

== Events ==
On 15 November 2011 manager Nigel Pearson left the club to take up an appointment at former club Leicester City, taking with him backroom staff Craig Shakespeare and Steve Walsh. Hull City appointed Nick Barmby as caretaker manager. On 18 November it was announced that Steve Wigley would be rejoining the club's backroom staff as first-team coach. On 6 January 2012 Barmby announced that he would be retiring as a player. On 10 January 2012 he was appointed as permanent manager of the club.

On 31 March 2012, during a match against Coventry City, captain Jack Hobbs suffered a rupture to his anterior cruciate ligament, an injury which at the time was set to keep him out of action for up to eight months. As a result of this Andy Dawson took over the role of captain for the remainder of the season.

On 1 May 2012, in a statement by club owners Assem and Ehab Allam, it was confirmed that a consultancy agreement with Adam Pearson had been terminated. A week later, Barmby was sacked as manager after publicly criticising the club's owners in an interview given to a local newspaper. The termination of his contract was ratified after an appeal on 24 May 2012.

At a press conference on 8 June 2012 it was announced that Steve Bruce had been appointed as the new manager on a three-year contract. Subsequently, first team coaches Steve Wigley and Stuart Watkiss left the club.

== Players ==
As of 11 April 2012

=== Current squad ===
Note: Flags indicate national team as defined under FIFA eligibility rules; some limited exceptions apply. Players may hold more than one non-FIFA nationality.

No.	Pos.	Nation	Player
1	GK	BRA	Adriano Basso
2	DF	ENG	Liam Rosenior
3	DF	ENG	Andy Dawson
4	MF	ENG	Paul McKenna
5	DF	WAL	James Chester
6	DF	ENG	Jack Hobbs (captain)
7	MF	ENG	Cameron Stewart
8	MF	NIR	Corry Evans
9	FW	ENG	Aaron McLean
10	MF	SLO	Robert Koren
11	FW	ENG	Jay Simpson
12	FW	ENG	Matty Fryatt
13	GK	ENG	Mark Oxley
14	MF	SCO	Tom Cairney

No.	Pos.	Nation	Player
16	MF	ENG	James Harper
19	DF	NIR	Joe Dudgeon
20	MF	IRL	Jamie Devitt
21	MF	IRL	Kevin Kilbane
25	DF	NIR	Danny East
26	DF	ENG	Sonny Bradley
29	MF	AUS	Richard Garcia
30	MF	NGR	Seyi Olofinjana
31	MF	ENG	Danny Emerton
33	GK	ENG	Joe Cracknell
34	DF	SCO	Liam Cooper
35	FW	ENG	Mark Cullen
–	MF	IRL	Gavan Holohan
—	MF	ENG	Matty Mainwaring

=== Out on loan ===
Note: Flags indicate national team as defined under FIFA eligibility rules; some limited exceptions apply. Players may hold more than one non-FIFA nationality.

No.	Pos.	Nation	Player
15	DF	IRL	Paul McShane (at Crystal Palace until the end of the 2011–12 season)
22	FW	NGR	Dele Adebola (at Notts County until the end of the 2011–12 season)
23	MF	ENG	Will Atkinson (at Bradford City until the end of the 2011–12 season)
–	MF	ALG	Kamel Ghilas (at Stade de Reims until the end of the 2011–12 Ligue 2)
—	DF	ENG	Conor Townsend (at Grimsby Town until the end of the 2011–12 season)

== Results ==
=== Pre-season ===
19 July 2011 Billy Bly; Memorial; Trophy	North Ferriby United	1–4	Hull City	North Ferriby
19:45 BST	Brooksby 14'	Report	Adebola 4'; Fryatt 13'; Cairney 20'; Cullen 88'	Stadium: Rapid Solicitors Stadium

20 July 2011	Winterton Rangers	1–2	Hull City	Winterton
19:45 BST	Wilkin 76'	Report	Evans 8'; Simpson 38'	Stadium: West Street

23 July 2011	Hull City	3–0	Liverpool	Hull
15:00 BST	Brady 20'; Koren 33'; Simpson 57'	Report		Stadium: KC Stadium; Attendance: 20,924

27 July 2011	Hull City	3–1	Bradford City	Hull
19:45 BST	Cairney 7', 39'; Pusic 72'	Report	Stewart 66'	Stadium: KC Stadium; Attendance: 2,155

30 July 2011	Chesterfield	0–2	Hull City	Chesterfield
15:00 BST		Report	Fryatt 27'; Chester 72'	Stadium: B2net Stadium; Attendance: 2,639; Referee: M. Haywood

=== Championship ===
5 August 2011 1	Hull City	0–1	Blackpool	Hull
19:45 BST	Dudgeon (yellow card) 38'; McKenna (yellow card) 77'	Report	Evatt (yellow card) 44'; Taylor-Fletcher 81'	Stadium: KC Stadium; Attendance: 18,907; Referee: S. Mathieson

13 August 2011 2	Ipswich Town	0–1	Hull City	Ipswich
15:00 BST		Report	Fryatt 76'; Cairney (yellow card) 84'	Stadium: Portman Road; Attendance: 18,116; Referee: Danny McDermid

16 August 2011 3	Leeds United	4–1	Hull City	Leeds
19:45 BST	McCormack 17'; Lees 40'; Snodgrass 47'; Snodgrass (yellow card) 51'; Núñez 68'	Report	Lees 21' (o.g.); Rosenior (yellow card) 55'	Stadium: Elland Road; Attendance: 22,363; Referee: E. Ilderton

20 August 2011 4	Hull City	0–1	Crystal Palace	Hull
15:00 BST	Dudgeon (yellow card) 8'	Report	Chester 15' (o.g.); Easter (yellow card) 41'	Stadium: KC Stadium; Attendance: 17,797; Referee: G. Salisbury

27 August 2011 5	Hull City	1–0	Reading	Hull
15:00 BST	Fryatt (yellow card) 15'; Koren (yellow card) 71'; Brady 73'; McKenna (yellow card) 87'	Report	Griffin (yellow card) 32'	Stadium: KC Stadium; Attendance: 17,295; Referee: O. Langford

10 September 2011 6	Peterborough United	0–1	Hull City	Peterborough
15:00 BST	Wootton (yellow card) 81'; Little (yellow card) 88'	Report	Rosenior (yellow card) 42'; McLean 47'; Hobbs (yellow card) 71'	Stadium: London Road Stadium; Attendance: 8,685; Referee: Geoff Eltringham

17 September 2011 7	Hull City	1–0	Portsmouth	Hull
15:00 BST	Koren 11'	Report	Varney (red card) 78'; Ben-Haim (yellow card) 80'	Stadium: KC Stadium; Attendance: 18,311; Referee: A. Haines

24 September 2011 8	Bristol City	1–1	Hull City	Bristol
15:00 BST	Pitman 79'	Report	Koren 56'; Chester (yellow card) 71'; McKenna (yellow card) 81'	Stadium: Ashton Gate Stadium; Attendance: 12,254; Referee: D. Sheldrake

27 September 2011 9	Doncaster Rovers	1–1	Hull City	Doncaster
19:45 BST	Waghorn 25'; McLean (yellow card) 83'	Report	Gillett 58'	Stadium: Keepmoat Stadium; Attendance: 9,786; Referee: S. Rushton

1 October 2011 10	Hull City	2–1	Cardiff City	Hull
15:00 BST	Pusic (yellow card) 12'; Fryatt 39'; Barmby 71'; Hobbs (yellow card) 80'; Koren (yellow card) 89'	Report	Ralls 62'	Stadium: KC Stadium; Attendance: 18,305; Referee: C. Webster

15 October 2011 11	Brighton & Hove Albion	0–0	Hull City	Brighton
17:30 BST	Bridcutt (yellow card) 57'	Report	McLean (yellow card) 50'; Evans (yellow card) 53'	Stadium: Falmer Stadium; Attendance: 19,722; Referee: James Linnington

22 October 2011 12	Hull City	3–2	Watford	Hull
15:00 BST	Brady (yellow card) 33'; Fryatt 51'; McLean 66', (yellow card) 69'; Koren 90+4'; Cairney (yellow card) 90+4'	Report	Dickinson (yellow card) 33'; Chester 36' (o.g.); Deeney (yellow card) 45+1'; Iwelumo 56'; Eustace (yellow card) 90+2'	Stadium: KC Stadium; Attendance: 18,324; Referee: Gary Sutton

29 October 2011 13	Nottingham Forest	0–1	Hull City	Nottingham
15:00 BST	Gunter (yellow card) 31'	Report	McLean (yellow card) 33', (goal) 74'; Chester (yellow card) 67'; Adebola (yellow card) 87'; Fryatt (yellow card) 90+4'; Rosenior (yellow card)	Stadium: City Ground; Attendance: 22,841; Referee: K. Stroud

1 November 2011 14	Barnsley	2–1	Hull City	Barnsley
19:45 GMT	O'Brien (yellow card) 29'; Davies 48'; Gray 59'	Report	Fryatt 79'	Stadium: Oakwell; Attendance: 9,869; Referee: Phil Gibbs

5 November 2011 15	Hull City	0–2	West Ham United	Hull
15:00 GMT		Report	Nolan (yellow card) 8'; Baldock 49'; Collison 57'; Tomkins (yellow card) 85'	Stadium: KC Stadium; Attendance: 21,756; Referee: N. Miller

19 November 2011 16	Derby County	0–2	Hull City	Derby
15:00 GMT	B Davies (yellow card) 68'	Report	Fryatt 17'; Stewart 23'; Rosenior (yellow card) 40'; Evans (yellow card) 50'; Chester (yellow card) 52'; McLean (yellow card) 78'	Stadium: Pride Park Stadium; Attendance: 30,391; Referee: D. Deadman

26 November 2011 17	Hull City	2–3	Burnley	Hull
15:00 GMT	Fryatt 11', 55'; McKenna (yellow card) 68'; Evans (yellow card) 78'	Report	Wallace (yellow card) 51'; Edgar 78', 82'; Rodriguez 90+3'	Stadium: KC Stadium; Attendance: 20,238; Referee: A. Taylor

29 November 2011 18	Southampton	2–1	Hull City	Southampton
19:45 GMT	Davis (yellow card) 27'; Guly 48'; Lallana 55'	Report	Koren 43'; Chester (yellow card) 44'; Brady (red card) 79'	Stadium: St Mary's Stadium; Attendance: 22,983; Referee: O. Langford

3 December 2011 19	Hull City	2–1	Leicester City	Hull
15:00 GMT	Dawson (yellow card) 24'; Fryatt 30' (pen.); Koren 88'	Report	Mills (red card) 28'; Konchesky 41'	Stadium: KC Stadium; Attendance: 20,148; Referee: S. Hooper

7 December 2011 20	Hull City	2–1	Birmingham City	Hull
19:45 GMT	Koren 47'; McLean (yellow card) 50', (goal) 67'; McKenna (yellow card) 52'; Dawson (yellow card) 71'	Report	Chris Wood 34'; N'Daw (yellow card) 86'	Stadium: KC Stadium; Attendance: 17,438; Referee: M. Naylor

10 December 2011 21	Coventry City	0–1	Hull City	Coventry
15:00 GMT	Gardner (yellow card) 33'	Report	Evans 60'	Stadium: Ricoh Arena; Attendance: 12,652; Referee: Paul Tierney

17 December 2011 22	Hull City	2–0	Millwall	Hull
15:00 GMT	Smith 54' (o.g.); Koren 80'	Report	Stewart (yellow card) 56'	Stadium: KC Stadium; Attendance: 17,841; Referee: D Coote

26 December 2011 23	Middlesbrough	1–0	Hull City	Middlesbrough
15:00 GMT	McDonald (yellow card) 75'; Robson 87'	Report	Dawson (yellow card) 45+1'; Evans (yellow card) 47'; Rosenior (yellow card) 90+2'	Stadium: Riverside Stadium; Attendance: 27,794; Referee: N. Swarbrick

31 December 2011 24	Burnley	1–0	Hull City	Burnley
15:00 GMT	Paterson 34', (yellow card) 86'	Report	McShane (yellow card) 53'	Stadium: Turf Moor; Attendance: 15,071; Referee: Chris Sarginson

2 January 2012 25	Hull City	0–1	Derby County	Hull
15:00 GMT	Rosenior (yellow card) 8'; Chester (yellow card) 78'	Report	Robinson 46'; Bailey (yellow card) 60'; Shackell (yellow card) 90+4'	Stadium: KC Stadium; Attendance: 20,704; Referee: Phil Gibbs

14 January 2012 26	Hull City	1–0	Peterborough United	Hull
15:00 GMT	Koren 27'; Evans (yellow card) 68'; Cairney (yellow card) 90'	Report		Stadium: KC Stadium; Attendance: 18,074; Referee: A. Madley

21 January 2012 27	Reading	0–1	Hull City	Reading
15:00 GMT	Hunt (yellow card) 69'	Report	Dawson (yellow card) 20'; Brady 66'	Stadium: Madejski Stadium; Attendance: 17,556; Referee: G. Scott

31 January 2012 28	Hull City	0–0	Doncaster Rovers	Hull
19:45 GMT	McKenna (yellow card) 73'	Report		Stadium: KC Stadium; Attendance: 19,187; Referee: J. Waugh

4 February 2012 –	Portsmouth	P – P	Hull City	Portsmouth
15:00 GMT		Frozen pitch		Stadium: Fratton Park

11 February 2012 29	Hull City	3–0	Bristol City	Hull
15:00 GMT	Chester (yellow card) 10'; Hobbs 13'; Koren 15'; Fryatt 60'	Report	Fontaine (yellow card) 23'	Stadium: KC Stadium; Attendance: 17,435; Referee: T. Bates

14 February 2012 30	Birmingham City	0–0	Hull City	Birmingham
19:45 GMT	Caldwell (yellow card) 69'	Report		Stadium: St Andrew's; Attendance: 18,900; Referee: F. Graham

22 February 2012 31	Hull City	0–0	Brighton & Hove Albion	Hull
19:45 GMT	Dawson (yellow card) 62'; McKenna (yellow card) 89'	Report		Stadium: KC Stadium; Attendance: 17,769; Referee: Carl Berry

2 March 2012 32	Blackpool	1–1	Hull City	Blackpool
19:45 GMT	Ince 26'	Report	Rosenior (yellow card) 30'; Evans (yellow card) 73'; Fryatt 90'	Stadium: Bloomfield Road; Attendance: 12,491; Referee: Ilderton

6 March 2012 33	Hull City	0–0	Leeds United	Hull
19:45 GMT	Evans (yellow card) 84'	Report	Clayton (yellow card) 77'	Stadium: KC Stadium; Attendance: 22,676; Referee: Stuart Attwell

10 March 2012 34	Hull City	2–2	Ipswich Town	Hull
15:00 GMT	Brady 17'; McKenna (yellow card) 52'; Koren 54'; Dawson (yellow card) 75'	Report	Delaney (yellow card) 31'; Leadbitter 67' (pen.), 70'	Stadium: KC Stadium; Attendance: 17,625; Referee: R. East

13 March 2012 35	Cardiff City	0–3	Hull City	Cardiff
19:45 GMT	Lawrence (yellow card) 42'; Gunnarsson (yellow card) 83'	Report	McNaughton 6' (o.g.); Chester 47'; McLean 55'; Rosenior (yellow card) 80'	Stadium: Cardiff City Stadium; Attendance: 20,366; Referee: G. Scott

17 March 2012 36	Crystal Palace	0–0	Hull City	Selhurst
15:00 GMT		Report		Stadium: Selhurst Park; Attendance: 13,324; Referee: D. Drysdale

20 March 2012 37	Hull City	0–2	Southampton	Hull
19:45 GMT		Report	Hobbs 14' (o.g.); De Ridder (yellow card) 52'; Hooiveld 59'	Stadium: KC Stadium; Attendance: 18,066; Referee: D. Webb

24 March 2012 38	Leicester City	2–1	Hull City	Leicester
15:00 GMT	Dyer 18'; Marshall 19'; Danns (red card) 56'	Report	Fryatt 8'	Stadium: King Power Stadium; Attendance: 23,759; Referee: N. Miller

27 March 2012 39	Portsmouth	2–0	Hull City	Portsmouth
19:45 BST	Maguire 21'; Ward 25'; Rekik (yellow card) 75'	Report	Dawson (yellow card) 34'; Hobbs (yellow card) 64'; Rosenior (yellow card) 77'	Stadium: Fratton Park; Attendance: 14,751; Referee: D. Sheldrake

31 March 2012 40	Hull City	0–2	Coventry City	Hull
15:00 BST	Stewart (yellow card) 41'; McLean (yellow card) 59'	Report	Cooper 13' (o.g.); Platt (yellow card) 63'; McDonald 86'	Stadium: KC Stadium; Attendance: 17,279; Referee: Graham Salisbury

7 April 2012 41	Millwall	2–0	Hull City	South Bermondsey
15:00 BST	Kane 25'; Lowry (yellow card) 71'; Keogh 81'	Report	Garcia (yellow card) 73'; Cooper (yellow card) 80'; McKenna (yellow card) 85'	Stadium: New Den; Attendance: 12,372; Referee: D. Deadman

9 April 2012 42	Hull City	2–1	Middlesbrough	Hull
15:00 BST	King 58'; Cooper (yellow card) 68'; Evans (yellow card) 86'; Fryatt 88'	Report	Emnes 13'	Stadium: KC Stadium; Attendance: 19,613; Referee: A. Woolmer

14 April 2012 43	Watford	1–1	Hull City	Watford
15:00 BST	Deeney 12'; Mariappa (yellow card) 62' (red card) 65'	Report	Chester 4', (yellow card) 56'	Stadium: Vicarage Road; Attendance: 11,596; Referee: Phil Dowd

17 April 2012 44	Hull City	3–1	Barnsley	Hull
19:45 BST	Fryatt 37', 44', 83'	Report	Foster (yellow card) 32'; Gray 74'	Stadium: KC Stadium; Attendance: 16,604; Referee: Paul Tierney

21 April 2012 45	Hull City	2–1	Nottingham Forest	Hull
15:00 BST	Garcia (yellow card) 40'; Gunter 58' (o.g.); Rosenior (yellow card) 70'; Evans (yellow card) 74'; Fryatt 81' (pen.)	Report	Reid (yellow card) 61'; Majewski 90+3'	Stadium: KC Stadium; Attendance: 20,786; Referee: Geoff Eltringham

28 April 2012 46	West Ham United	2–1	Hull City	Upton Park, London
12:30 BST	Cole 36', 49'; Nolan (yellow card) 51'	Report	Evans 81'	Stadium: Boleyn Ground; Attendance: 35,000; Referee: N. Miller

==== League table ====
Pos	Team	Pld	W	D	L	GF	GA	GD	Pts	Promotion or relegation
6	Cardiff City	46	19	18	9	66	53	+13	75	Qualification for Championship play-offs
7	Middlesbrough	46	18	16	12	52	51	+1	70	
8	Hull City	46	19	11	16	47	44	+3	68	
9	Leicester City	46	18	12	16	66	55	+11	66	
10	Brighton & Hove Albion	46	17	15	14	52	52	0	66	

Updated to match(es) played on 28 April 2012. Source: BBC Sport
Rules for classification: 1) points; 2) goal difference; 3) number of goals scored.

==== Result round by round ====
Round	1	2	3	4	5	6	7	8	9	10	11	12	13	14	15	16	17	18	19	20	21	22	23	24	25	26	27	28	29	30	31	32	33	34	35	36	37	38	39	40	41	42	43	44	45	46
Ground	H	A	A	H	H	A	H	A	A	H	A	H	A	A	H	A	H	A	H	H	A	H	A	A	H	H	A	H	H	A	H	A	H	H	A	A	H	A	A	H	A	H	A	H	H	A
Result	L	W	L	L	W	W	W	D	D	W	D	W	W	L	L	W	L	L	W	W	W	W	L	L	L	W	W	D	W	D	D	D	D	D	W	D	L	L	L	L	L	W	D	W	W	L
Position	21	13	18	19	13	9	8	7	7	6	6	7	6	6	8	6	7	10	8	6	5	4	5	6	6	6	5	5	6	7	8	9	9	9	6	7	9	9	9	9	10	10	10	8	8	8

Updated to match(es) played on 28 April 2012. Source: Competitive match reports
A = Away; H = Home; W = Win; D = Draw; L = Loss

== League Cup ==
Hull City received a home match against League Two side Macclesfield Town in the first round of the League Cup drawn on 16 June 2011. The match took place on 9 August 2011 at the KC Stadium.

9 August 2011 Round 1	Hull City	0–2	Macclesfield Town	Hull
19:45 BST		Report	Sinclair 17', 59'	Stadium: KC Stadium; Attendance: 4,826; Referee: Bobby Madley

== FA Cup ==
Hull City enter the competition at the third round proper stage with matches taking place in early January 2012. The draw for the round took place on 4 December 2011 and Hull were given a home tie against Ipswich Town. The match took place on 7 January 2012 at the KC Stadium and Hull won 3–1. The draw for the fourth round took place the following day and Hull were drawn at home against League Two newcomers Crawley Town. The match took place on 28 January 2012 at the KC Stadium and Hull lost out to a 57-minute goal by Matt Tubbs.

7 January 2012 Third	Hull City	3–1	Ipswich Town	Hull
15:00 GMT	McLean 27'; Cairney 32'; McShane (yellow card) 54'; Stewart 90+4'	Report	Smith (yellow card) 50'; Scotland 57'	Stadium: KC Stadium; Attendance: 10,246; Referee: C. Pawson

28 January 2012 Fourth	Hull City	0–1	Crawley Town	Hull
15:00 GMT	East (yellow card) 27'; Hobbs (yellow card) 45+1'; Evans (yellow card) 79'	Report	Tubbs 57'; McFadzean (yellow card) 90+1'	Stadium: KC Stadium; Attendance: 14,473; Referee: Stuart Attwell

== Statistics ==
=== Captains ===
No.	P	Name	Country	No. games	Notes
6	DF	Jack Hobbs	(England)	43	
3	DF	Andy Dawson	(England)	6	

Last updated: 28 April 2012
Source: Competitive match reports.
Competitive matches only
Matches started as captain only
Country: FIFA nationality; No.: Squad number; P: Position; Name: Player name; No. Games: Number of games started as captain.

=== Appearances ===
As of 28 April 2012

Appearances shown after a "+" indicate player came on during course of the match

No.	Pos	Nat	Player	Total		Championship		FA Cup		League Cup	
No.	Pos	Nat	Player	Apps	Goals	Apps	Goals	Apps	Goals	Apps	Goals
1	GK	(Brazil) BRA	Adriano Basso	14	0	12+1	0	0	0	1	0
2	DF	(England) ENG	Liam Rosenior	44	0	44	0	0	0	0	0
3	DF	(England) ENG	Andy Dawson	33	0	31+1	0	0	0	1	0
4	MF	(England) ENG	Paul McKenna	43	0	37+4	0	1	0	1	0
5	DF	(Wales) WAL	James Chester	45	2	44	2	0	0	1	0
6	DF	(England) ENG	Jack Hobbs	43	1	40	1	2	0	1	0
7	MF	(England) ENG	Cameron Stewart	32	2	26+5	1	1	1	0	0
8	MF	(Northern Ireland) NIR	Corry Evans	45	2	38+5	2	1+1	0	0	0
9	FW	(England) ENG	Aaron McLean	41	6	28+11	5	1+1	1	0	0
10	MF	(Slovenia) SLO	Robert Koren	41	10	41	10	0	0	0	0
11	FW	(England) ENG	Jay Simpson	5	0	0+3	0	0+1	0	1	0
12	FW	(England) ENG	Matty Fryatt	48	16	39+7	16	1	0	1	0
13	GK	(England) ENG	Mark Oxley	0	0	0	0	0	0	0	0
14	MF	(Scotland) SCO	Tom Cairney	29	1	18+9	0	2	1	0	0
17	MF	(Republic of Ireland) IRL	Robbie Brady	41	3	24+15	3	2	0	0	0
19	DF	(Northern Ireland) NIR	Joe Dudgeon	26	0	17+7	0	2	0	0	0
20	MF	(Republic of Ireland) IRL	Jamie Devitt	1	0	0	0	0	0	1	0
22	FW	(Nigeria) NGR	Dele Adebola	10	0	2+8	0	0	0	0	0
24	GK	(Hungary) HUN	Péter Gulácsi	15	0	13+2	0	0	0	0	0
25	DF	(England) ENG	Danny East	2	0	0	0	1	0	1	0
26	DF	(England) ENG	Sonny Bradley	2	0	1+1	0	0	0	0	0
27	MF	(Austria) AUT	Martin Pusic	3	0	2	0	0	0	1	0
27	FW	(Norway) NOR	Joshua King	19	1	8+10	1	1	0	0	0
28	FW	(England) ENG	Martyn Waghorn	5	1	5	1	0	0	0	0
28	GK	(Italy) ITA	Vito Mannone	23	0	21	0	2	0	0	0
29	FW	(Australia) AUS	Richard Garcia	12	0	6+4	0	2	0	0	0
30	MF	(Nigeria) NGR	Seyi Olofinjana	5	0	1+2	0	0+2	0	0	0
31	MF	(England) ENG	Danny Emerton	0	0	0	0	0	0	0	0
33	GK	(England) ENG	Joe Cracknell	0	0	0	0	0	0	0	0
34	DF	(Scotland) SCO	Liam Cooper	8	0	7	0	1	0	0	0
35	FW	(England) ENG	Mark Cullen	5	0	0+4	0	0+1	0	0	0
Players featured for Hull this season who are currently out on loan:
15	DF	(Republic of Ireland) IRL	Paul McShane	2	0	1	0	1	0	0	0
16	MF	(England) ENG	James Harper	2	0	0+1	0	0	0	1	0
Players featured for Hull this season who have retired:
18	MF	(England) ENG	Nick Barmby	9	1	0+8	1	0	0	0+1	0

=== Top scorers ===
Player	Number	Position	Championship	FA Cup	League Cup	Total		
(England) Matty Fryatt	Number	Position	12	FW	16	0	0	16
(Slovenia) Robert Koren	10	MF	10	0	0	10		
(England) Aaron McLean	9	FW	5	1	0	6		
(Republic of Ireland) Robbie Brady	17	MF	3	0	0	3		
(Wales) James Chester	5	DF	2	0	0	2		
(Northern Ireland) Corry Evans	8	MF	2	0	0	2		
(England) Cameron Stewart	7	MF	1	1	0	2		
(England) Nick Barmby	18	MF	1	0	0	1		
(Scotland) Tom Cairney	14	MF	0	1	0	1		
(England) Jack Hobbs	6	DF	1	0	0	1		
(Norway) Joshua King	27	FW	1	0	0	1		
(England) Martyn Waghorn	28	FW	1	0	0	1		
Total			43	3	0	46		

=== Disciplinary record ===
Player	Number	Position	Championship		FA Cup		League Cup		Total	
Player	Number	Position	Yellow card	Red card	Yellow card	Red card	Yellow card	Red card	Yellow card	Red card
(Republic of Ireland) Robbie Brady	17	MF	1	1	0	0	0	0	1	1
(Northern Ireland) Corry Evans	8	MF	9	0	1	0	0	0	10	0
(England) Paul McKenna	4	MF	10	0	0	0	0	0	10	0
(England) Liam Rosenior	2	DF	10	0	0	0	0	0	10	0
(Wales) James Chester	5	DF	7	0	0	0	0	0	7	0
(England) Andy Dawson	3	DF	7	0	0	0	0	0	7	0
(England) Aaron McLean	9	FW	7	0	0	0	0	0	7	0
(England) Jack Hobbs	6	DF	3	0	1	0	0	0	4	0
(Scotland) Tom Cairney	14	MF	3	0	0	0	0	0	3	0
(Republic of Ireland) Liam Cooper	34	DF	2	0	0	0	0	0	2	0
(Northern Ireland) Joe Dudgeon	19	DF	2	0	0	0	0	0	2	0
(England) Matty Fryatt	12	FW	2	0	0	0	0	0	2	0
(Australia) Richard Garcia	29	MF	2	0	0	0	0	0	2	0
(Slovenia) Robert Koren	10	MF	2	0	0	0	0	0	2	0
(Republic of Ireland) Paul McShane	15	DF	1	0	1	0	0	0	2	0
(Nigeria) Dele Adebola	22	FW	1	0	0	0	0	0	1	0
(England) Danny East	25	DF	0	0	1	0	0	0	1	0
(Austria) Martin Pusic	27	MF	1	0	0	0	0	0	1	0
(England) Cameron Stewart	7	MF	1	0	0	0	0	0	1	0
Total			71	1	4	0	0	0	75	1

== Transfers ==
This section only lists transfers and loans for the 2011–12 season, which began 1 July 2011. For transactions in May and June 2011, see transfers and loans for the 2010–11 season.

=== Players in ===
Date	Player	From	Fee	Ref
1 July 2011	(England) Paul McKenna	(England) Nottingham Forest	Free	
23 July 2011	(Brazil) Adriano Basso	Unattached	Free	
9 August 2011	(Austria) Martin Pusic	(Austria) SC Rheindorf Altach		

=== Players out ===
Date	Player	To	Fee	Ref
18 August 2011	(England) Jimmy Bullard	Contract terminated		
9 January 2012	(Austria) Martin Pusic	Released		

=== Loans in ===
Date From	Player	From	Date To	Ref
19 July 2011	(Hungary) Péter Gulácsi	(England) Liverpool	11 April 2012	
19 July 2011	(Republic of Ireland) Robbie Brady	(England) Manchester United	30 June 2012	
31 August 2011	(England) Martyn Waghorn	(England) Leicester City	6 December 2011	
4 January 2012	(Italy) Vito Mannone	(England) Arsenal	30 June 2012	
13 January 2012	(Northern Ireland) Trevor Carson	(England) Sunderland	13 February 2012	
16 January 2012	(Norway) Joshua King	(England) Manchester United	30 June 2012	

=== Loans out ===
Date From	Player	To	Date To	Ref
8 July 2011	(Scotland) Liam Cooper	(England) Huddersfield Town	30 November 2011	
20 July 2011	(England) Mark Cullen	(England) Bury	31 December 2011	
2 August 2011	(Republic of Ireland) Kevin Kilbane	(England) Derby County	29 November 2011	
10 August 2011	(Algeria) Kamel Ghilas	(France) Stade de Reims	18 May 2012	
12 August 2011	(England) Will Atkinson	(England) Plymouth Argyle	12 January 2012	
31 August 2011	(Republic of Ireland) Jamie Devitt	(England) Bradford City	January 2012	
31 August 2011	(England) Jay Simpson	(England) Millwall	January 2012	
20 December 2011	(England) Conor Townsend	(England) Grimsby Town	30 June 2012	
6 January 2012	(England) Sonny Bradley	(England) Aldershot Town	29 March 2012	
13 January 2012	(Republic of Ireland) Paul McShane	(England) Crystal Palace	30 June 2012	
18 January 2012	(England) Matty Mainwaring	(England) Stockport County	19 February 2012	
24 January 2012	(England) James Harper	(England) Wycombe Wanderers	24 February 2012	
26 January 2012	(England) Will Atkinson	(England) Bradford City	30 June 2012	
17 February 2012	(Republic of Ireland) Jamie Devitt	(England) Accrington Stanley	17 March 2012	
20 March 2012	(Nigeria) Dele Adebola	(England) Notts County	30 June 2012	

== Kits ==
Hull City's home kit for 2011–12.	Hull City's away kit for 2011–12.

The new away kit was revealed on 16 July 2011 in Hull city centre.

For the 2011–12 season, the main kit sponsor is Cash Converters and it is manufactured by Adidas.

== Awards ==
The end of season awards were made on the pitch following the end of the final home game of the season against Nottingham Forest on 21 April 2012. Robert Koren was voted as the Player of the Season, closely followed by James Chester, with Jack Hobbs taking third place. James Chester took the prize for Players Player of the Year and the Goal of the Season was taken by Robert Koren for his goal against Leicester City on 3 December 2011.
