= James Chester =

Wales international footballer (born 1989)

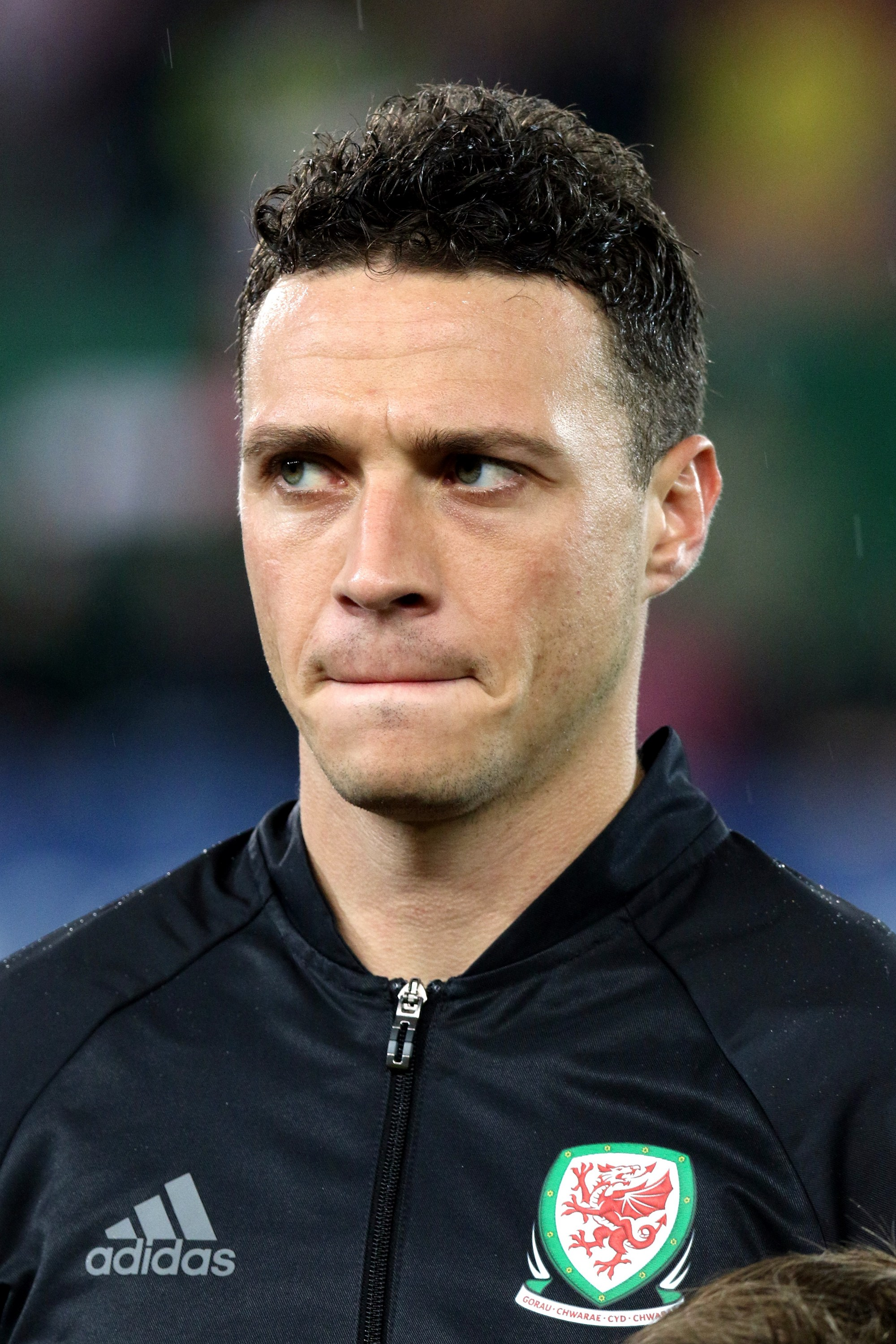
- Chester lining up for Wales in 2016

Personal information
- Full name: James Grant Chester
- Date of birth: 23 January 1989 (age 37)
- Place of birth: Warrington, England
- Height: 5 ft 11 in (1.80 m)
- Position: Centre-back

Youth career
- –2007: Manchester United

Senior career*
Years	Team	Apps	(Gls)
2007–2011	Manchester United	1	(0)
2009	→ Peterborough United (loan)	5	(0)
2009	→ Plymouth Argyle (loan)	3	(0)
2010–2011	→ Carlisle United (loan)	18	(2)
2011–2015	Hull City	156	(7)
2015–2016	West Bromwich Albion	13	(0)
2016–2020	Aston Villa	119	(12)
2020	→ Stoke City (loan)	16	(0)
2020–2022	Stoke City	49	(0)
2022–2023	Derby County	7	(0)
2023–2024	Barrow	38	(2)
2024–2025	Salford City	0	(0)
Total		424	(23)

International career^{‡}
2014–2018	Wales	35	(0)
Medal record
Men's football
Representing Wales
UEFA European Championship
Bronze medal – third place	2016 France
- * Club domestic league appearances and goals as of 13:27, 17 July 2024 (UTC) ‡ National team caps and goals as of 20:20, 18 November 2018 (UTC)

James Grant Chester (born 23 January 1989) is a former professional footballer who played as a centre-back. Starting at Manchester United, he later went on to play for the likes of Hull City, West Bromwich Albion, Aston Villa and Stoke City. He also won 35 caps for the Wales national football team.

Chester began his career with Manchester United but made only one appearance for the club. He had spells on loan at Peterborough United, Plymouth Argyle and Carlisle United before joining Hull City in January 2011 on a permanent contract. He spent three and a half years there before signing for West Bromwich Albion in 2015. After only one year with West Brom, Chester joined Championship club Aston Villa in the summer of 2016. Chester helped Villa gain promotion to the Premier League after winning the 2019 EFL Championship play-off final. He joined Stoke City on loan in January 2020 before making it permanent in August 2020. He would leave Stoke in July 2022 and joined League One Derby County, however left in 2023 after an injury hit spell. In September 2023, he signed a deal with League Two Barrow. At the start of the 2024–25 season, Chester signed for League Two Salford City, but retired in February 2025 after difficulties with injuries.

He made his international debut for the Wales in June 2014. Chester played at UEFA Euro 2016 where Wales progressed to the semi-final of a major international tournament for the first time in the team's history.

== Club career ==
=== Manchester United ===
Chester was born in Warrington, and attended Birchwood Community High School. He began his career with his local club, Winwick Athletic. At the age of eight, he joined the Manchester United Academy, and signed a trainee contract at the age of 16 in July 2005. At the end of the season, he played in the teams for both the FA Youth Cup and Manchester Senior Cup finals. However, the teams lost both finals, losing to Liverpool on penalties in the former and to Manchester City in the latter.

In July 2007, Chester signed his first professional contract with United. After being named as a substitute for the first team's 1–0 win over Bolton Wanderers on 17 January 2009, Chester was again selected as a substitute for the League Cup semi-final second leg against Derby County. With United 3–0 up at the time, Chester came on as a 67th-minute substitute for Gary Neville. Although Derby pulled two goals back, United ended up winning the match 4–2, meaning that they won the tie 4–3 on aggregate and qualified for the 2009 League Cup final.

On 2 February 2009, Chester joined League One club Peterborough United – managed by Alex Ferguson's son, Darren – on a one-month loan. He made five appearances for the Posh before returning to Manchester United on 2 March. Towards the end of the season, along with Tom Cleverley and Corry Evans, Chester was nominated by reserve team manager Ole Gunnar Solskjær for the Denzil Haroun Reserve Team Player of the Year award.

On 18 September 2009, Chester joined Championship club Plymouth Argyle on a three-month loan along with his Manchester United teammate David Gray. However, in his third appearance for the Pilgrims, Chester suffered cartilage damage that would rule him out of action for 10–12 weeks, beyond the scheduled end of his loan spell. He therefore returned to Manchester United on 13 October 2009.

On 3 August 2010, Chester joined League One club Carlisle United on loan until 3 January 2011, after impressing in a trial match against Hibernian on 1 August. He made his competitive debut on 7 August, starting at centre-back in Carlisle's 2–0 home win over Brentford on the opening day of the league season. Over the course of his loan spell, Chester scored four goals for Carlisle in 23 appearances in all competitions, including the winning goal in Carlisle's 3–2 FA Cup second round win over Tamworth.

=== Hull City ===
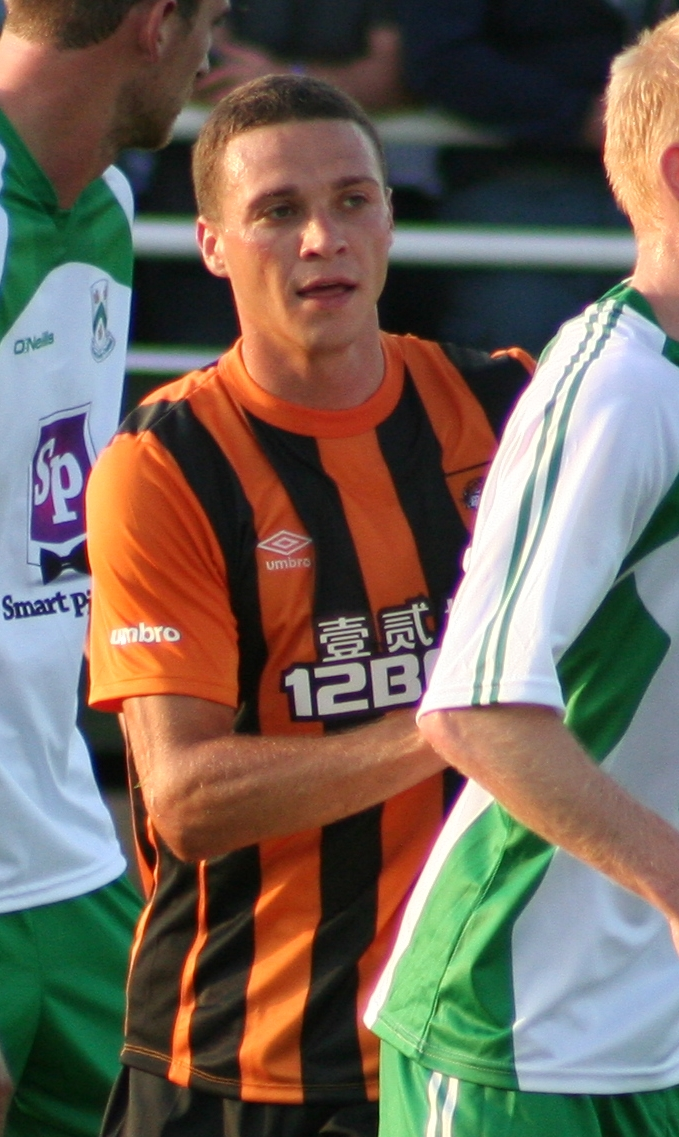
Chester playing for Hull City in 2014

On 17 December 2010, Chester expressed an interest in staying at Carlisle beyond the end of his loan contract, but the transfer window brought with it talk of Chester making a transfer to Championship club Hull City, with Hull manager Nigel Pearson going public on 3 January with his interest in the defender. The next day, Hull had a bid believed to be worth around £300,000 accepted by Manchester United, and Chester underwent a medical on 6 January. The transfer was completed on 7 January, with Chester signing a three-and-a-half-year contract. He made his debut in the 2–0 home win against Barnsley on 15 January 2011. Chester scored his first goal for the club in the 2–2 draw against Leeds United at the KC Stadium on 1 February 2011. Chester adjusted well to the Championship, putting in several strong performances as Hull finished the 2010–11 season in 11th position. Chester enjoyed a strong year in his second season at Hull, playing almost every game under managers Nigel Pearson and Nick Barmby in central defence, forming a successful partnership with Jack Hobbs. This partnership was for a long period the basis of the tightest defence in the league as they conceded 44 goals with only champions Reading conceding less. Chester finished the season as runner-up in the club's player of the year awards.

Under new manager Steve Bruce, Chester quickly became accustomed to playing as part of a three-man defence in the team's new system, alongside a combination of Abdoulaye Faye, manager's son Alex Bruce, Paul McShane, and Jack Hobbs. Chester scored his first goal of the season in a 3–2 victory away to Birmingham City on 17 November 2012. Chester played 48 times for Hull in 2012–13 helping the Tigers gain promotion on the final day of the season. On 26 June 2013, Chester signed a new three-year contract with Hull.

Chester made his Premier League debut on 18 August 2013 at Stamford Bridge in a 2–0 away defeat to Chelsea. Five games into his debut season as a first-team player in the Premier League, Chester was ruled out for an initial six-to-eight weeks after pulling his hamstring against Newcastle United on 21 September 2013. After two months out injured, he made his return in Hull's 2–0 defeat away to Arsenal on 4 December. Chester scored his first goal of the 2013–14 season in the fourth minute of Hull City's Boxing Day match against Manchester United; however, he later scored a second-half own goal to give Manchester United a 3–2 victory. On 17 May 2014, he started in the 2014 FA Cup final against Arsenal and scored to put his side 1–0 up, although Hull went on to lose 3–2. Chester played 28 times in 2014–15 as Hull had a difficult campaign and were relegated to the Championship, finishing three points from safety.

=== West Bromwich Albion ===
On 29 July 2015, Chester joined Premier League club West Bromwich Albion on a four-year contract for a reported fee of £8 million. Chester made his West Brom debut on 10 August appearing in a 3–0 defeat to Manchester City. On 25 August, Chester started for West Brom in a League Cup match against Port Vale, both sides failed to score and the game went to penalties, Chester scored the decisive penalty enabling West Brom to progress to the next round of the competition. West Brom manager Tony Pulis played Chester in unfamiliar full-back roles instead of centre-back leading to Chester becoming unhappy at the Hawthorns. In August 2016 West Brom accepted a bid for Chester from Aston Villa.

=== Aston Villa ===
On 12 August 2016, Chester signed a four-year contract with newly relegated Championship club Aston Villa for an undisclosed fee, believed to have been more than the £8 million West Brom paid Hull. Chester scored his first goal for Villa, the only goal of the game, against Derby County on 25 February 2017. Chester made 46 appearances in 2016–17 as Villa had a forgettable campaign, finishing 13th. Chester was an ever-present in 2017–18 playing in 50 matches as Villa reached the 2018 EFL Championship play-off final but lost 1–0 to Fulham.

Chester began the 2018–19 campaign as a main stay of the team before he suffered a knee injury in January 2019 ruling him out of the remainder of the season. In his absence Villa again reached the play-off final where this time they were successful, beating Derby County 2–1. Speaking at the end of the season Chester revealed that his knee injury is long standing problem and that he had been having to play through the pain barrier earlier in the season. Chester made his return from injury on 18 December 2019 in a 5–0 EFL Cup win over Liverpool. On 25 June 2020, it was confirmed that Chester had been released by Aston Villa, signing a contract extension to allow him to finish the Championship season with Stoke City before becoming a free agent.

=== Stoke City ===
Chester joined Stoke City on 31 January 2020 on loan for the remainder of the 2019–20 season. He made his debut on 8 February 2020 in a 3–1 win against Charlton Athletic. The season was suspended in March due to the COVID-19 pandemic and restarted in June with Chester extending his loan to cover the remaining matches. He made 16 appearances for Stoke in 2019–20 helping them to avoid relegation from the Championship. Chester signed a one-year contract with Stoke on 10 August 2020. He made 33 appearances in 2020–21 as Stoke finished in 14th position. In 2021–22 Chester was mainly used as back-up by Michael O'Neill, making 22 appearances and he was released by Stoke at the end of the season.

=== Derby County ===
On 6 July 2022, Chester joined recently relegated League One club Derby County on a one-year contract. Chester's time at Derby was plagued by continuing injuries. After missing the opening eight games of the season, Chester made his debut in a 2–1 win over Wycombe Wanderers. He appeared in the following five league games before going off injured in a 0–0 draw against Exeter City in October 2022. He returned to fitness but was injured in the warm-up prior to the 4–0 home win over Accrington Stanley in January 2023 before making an appearance. Chester made his first appearance in six months when he started in Derby's 2–0 win over Forest Green Rovers in April 2023, but was substituted through injury after 76-minutes, which would prove to bring his season to an end after just seven appearances, with 35 games missed through injury. Chester was not retained by Derby at the end of the season and became a free agent.

=== Barrow ===
On 1 September 2023, Chester joined Barrow of League Two on a deal until January 2024, subsequently extended until summer 2024. On 1 May 2024, the club revealed it had offered Chester another contract.

=== Salford City ===
On 17 July 2024, Chester joined fellow League Two side Salford City. Injuries meant that Chester could only make two appearances by 13 February 2025, when he announced that he was retiring from football at the age of 36.

== International career ==
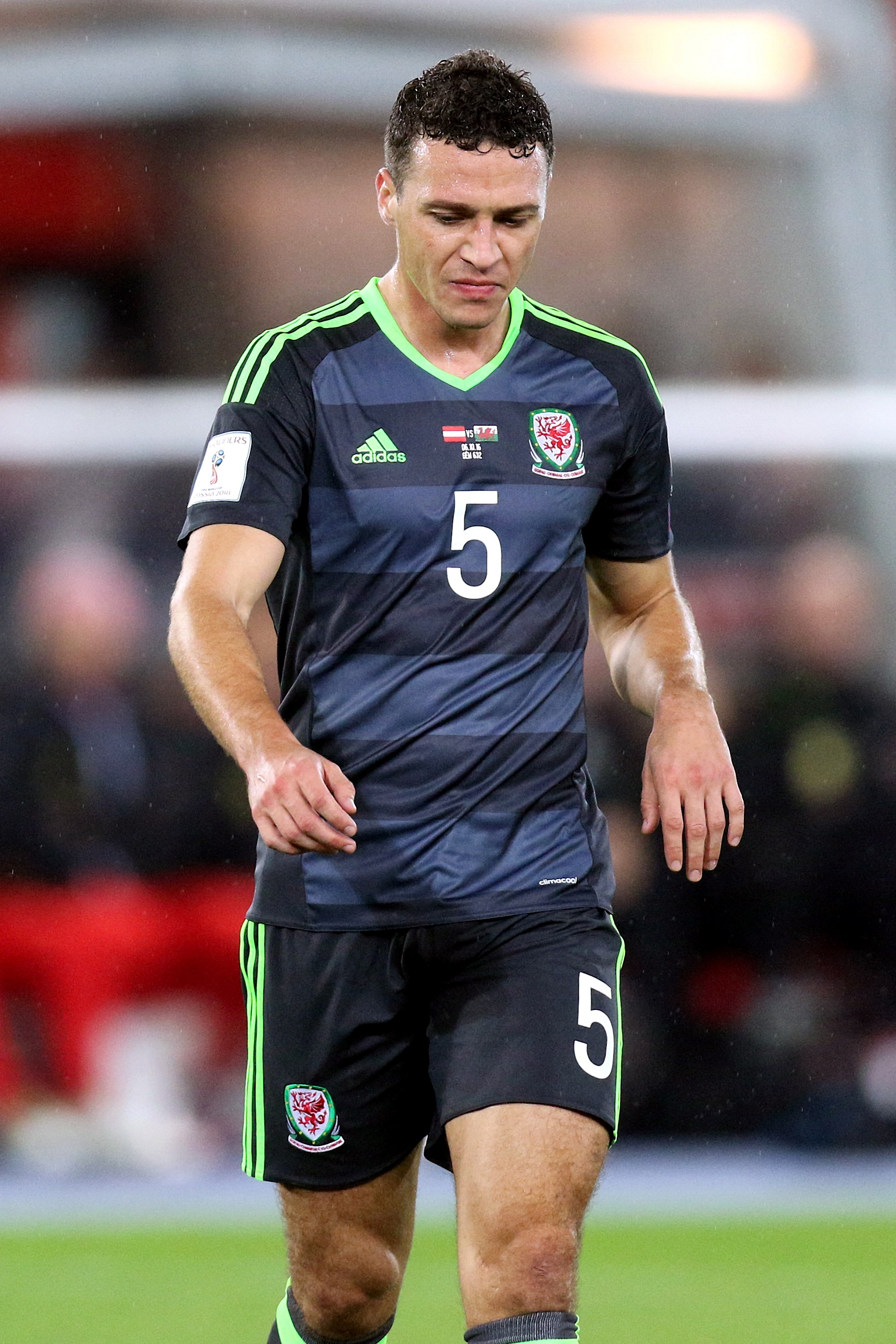
Chester playing for Wales in 2016

Born in England, Chester qualifies to play for Wales as his mother was born in Rhyl. He made his debut for Wales on 4 June 2014, starting in a friendly against the Netherlands.

Chester played all six games in Wales's journey to the semi-final of Euro 2016, playing on the right-hand side of the team's central defensive three.

== Career statistics ==
=== Club ===
Appearances and goals by club, season and competition
Club	Season	League			FA Cup		League Cup		Europe		Other		Total	
Club	Season	Division	Apps	Goals	Apps	Goals	Apps	Goals	Apps	Goals	Apps	Goals	Apps	Goals
Manchester United	2008–09	Premier League	0	0	0	0	1	0	0	0	0	0	1	0
Manchester United	2009–10	Premier League	0	0	0	0	0	0	0	0	0	0	0	0
Manchester United	2010–11	Premier League	0	0	—		—		—		—		0	0
Manchester United	Total		0	0	0	0	1	0	0	0	0	0	1	0
Peterborough United (loan)	2008–09	League One	5	0	—		—		—		—		5	0
Plymouth Argyle (loan)	2009–10	Championship	3	0	—		—		—		—		3	0
Carlisle United (loan)	2010–11	League One	18	2	2	1	1	0	—		3 (Note: Appearances in EFL Trophy)	1	24	4
Hull City	2010–11	Championship	21	1	—		—		—		—		21	1
Hull City	2011–12	Championship	44	2	0	0	1	0	—		—		45	2
Hull City	2012–13	Championship	44	1	2	0	2	0	—		—		48	1
Hull City	2013–14	Premier League	24	1	5	1	0	0	—		—		29	2
Hull City	2014–15	Premier League	23	2	0	0	1	0	4 (Note: Appearance in UEFA Europa League)	0	—		28	2
Hull City	Total		156	7	7	1	4	0	4	0	—		171	8
West Bromwich Albion	2015–16	Premier League	13	0	4	0	2	0	—		—		19	0
Aston Villa	2016–17	Championship	45	3	1	0	0	0	—		—		46	3
Aston Villa	2017–18	Championship	46	4	0	0	1	0	—		3 (Note: Appearances in EFL Championship play-offs)	0	50	4
Aston Villa	2018–19	Championship	28	5	0	0	0	0	—		0	0	28	5
Aston Villa	2019–20	Premier League	0	0	1	0	1	0	—		—		2	0
Aston Villa	Total		119	12	2	0	2	0	—		3	0	126	12
Stoke City (loan)	2019–20	Championship	16	0	0	0	0	0	—		—		16	0
Stoke City	2020–21	Championship	32	0	0	0	1	0	—		—		33	0
Stoke City	2021–22	Championship	17	0	2	0	3	0	—		—		22	0
Stoke City	Total		65	0	2	0	4	0	—		—		71	0
Derby County	2022–23	League One	7	0	0	0	0	0	—		0	0	7	0
Barrow	2023–24	League Two	38	2	2	0	0	0	—		1	0	41	2
Salford City	2024–25	League Two	0	0	0	0	1	0	—		1	0	2	0
Career total			424	23	19	2	15	0	4	0	8	1	474	26

=== International ===
As of match played 18 December 2018

Appearances and goals by national team and year
National team	Year	Apps	Goals
Wales	2014	5	0
Wales	2015	3	0
Wales	2016	13	0
Wales	2017	8	0
Wales	2018	6	0
Total		35	0

== Honours ==
Hull City

- Football League Championship runner-up: 2012–13
- FA Cup runner-up: 2013–14

Individual

- Denzil Haroun Reserve Team Player of the Year: 2007–08
