= Cameron Stewart (footballer) =

English footballer

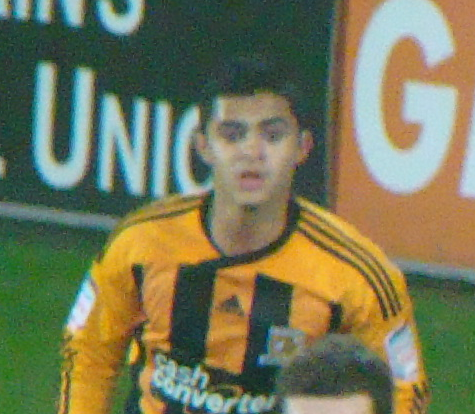
- Stewart playing for Hull City in 2012

Personal information
- Full name: Cameron Reece Stewart
- Date of birth: 8 April 1991 (age 35)
- Place of birth: Manchester, England
- Height: 5 ft 8 in (1.73 m)
- Position: Winger

Youth career
- –2007: Fletcher Moss Rangers
- 2007–2010: Manchester United

Senior career*
Years	Team	Apps	(Gls)
2009–2011	Manchester United	0	(0)
2010	→ Yeovil Town (loan)	5	(0)
2010–2011	→ Hull City (loan)	10	(0)
2011–2014	Hull City	37	(1)
2012–2013	→ Burnley (loan)	9	(0)
2013	→ Blackburn Rovers (loan)	7	(0)
2013–2014	→ Charlton Athletic (loan)	18	(3)
2014	→ Leeds United (loan)	11	(0)
2014–2016	Ipswich Town	0	(0)
2015	→ Barnsley (loan)	4	(0)
2015–2016	→ Doncaster Rovers (loan)	26	(4)
2017–2018	Lincoln City	4	(0)
Total		131	(8)

International career
2007–2008	England U17	4	(0)
2009	England U19	5	(0)
2011	England U20	1	(0)
- * Club domestic league appearances and goals

Cameron Reece Stewart (born 8 April 1991) is an English former professional footballer. He played primarily as a winger, but he also played as a forward.

He began his career with Fletcher Moss Rangers, then moving onto Manchester United, and also represented England at under-17, under-19 and under-20 level. He had loan spells with Yeovil Town and Hull City in the first half of the 2010–11 season, before he joined Hull permanently for an undisclosed fee in January 2011. After a year at Hull, he fell out of favour and went on successive loan spells to Burnley, Blackburn Rovers, Charlton Athletic and Leeds United throughout the 2012–13 and 2013–14 campaigns. He was due to join Leeds permanently at the end of his Hull contract in July 2014, but the transfer was cancelled and he instead joined Ipswich Town. However he made just two FA Cup appearances for the club, and had loan spells with Barnsley and Doncaster Rovers in the 2015–16 season, before he was released by Ipswich in August 2016. After trials with former club Charlton Athletic and Port Vale, he signed for Lincoln City in October 2017, but left the club at the end of the 2017–18 season. He retired from football at the age of 28.

== Club career ==
=== Manchester United ===
Born in Manchester, Stewart began his football career with Manchester United and signed as a trainee in 2007. After working his way up through the youth and reserve teams, he was promoted to the first-team by manager Alex Ferguson in December 2009. He joined the squad for the UEFA Champions League match away to VfL Wolfsburg, and was named as an unused substitute.

In July 2010, Stewart joined Yeovil Town on a six-month loan. He made his League One debut in a 2–1 victory over Leyton Orient at Huish Park on 7 August, the first day of the 2010–11 season, after coming on as a 77th-minute substitute for Dean Bowditch. Stewart returned to Old Trafford in October after making only five appearances for Terry Skiverton's "Glovers".

=== Hull City ===
On 25 November 2010, Stewart joined Hull City of the Championship on loan until 4 January 2011. He made his debut for the "Tigers" on 27 November in a 2–2 draw away at Middlesbrough. Hull City extended his loan until the end of the 2010–11 season after a string of good displays. On 31 January 2011, Stewart signed for Hull City on a permanent basis, for a fee believed to be in the region of around £300,000. However, on 19 February, he suffered cruciate ligament damage in a 1–1 draw at Ipswich Town, which ruled him out for the remainder of the season and the start of the following season.

After spending over nine months on the sidelines, Stewart returned to first-team action on 19 November 2011, and scored his first goal in senior football in a 2–0 win at Derby County after cutting inside from the left. He scored his second goal for Hull in a 3–1 FA Cup win over Ipswich Town at the KC Stadium on 7 January. Following some good performances after his comeback from injury, Stewart was subject to a bid from Leicester City – managed by former Hull boss Nigel Pearson, understood to be £1.5 million, which was rejected, with Hull warning that the winger was "not for sale". After heavy speculation, Stewart remained at Hull and played frequently for the rest of the 2011–12 season under manager Nick Barmby, and said he was "really happy" at the club.

After a few appearances for Hull under manager Steve Bruce, new signings meant that Stewart's opportunities at the club became limited, and he joined Championship rivals Burnley on loan on 31 August 2012. After starting two out of three of his first games at Turf Moor, his appearances became increasingly limited and he failed to play again for the "Clarets" after Sean Dyche replaced Eddie Howe as manager; as a result Hull manager Bruce commented that "he's probably going to come back to us in January and we'll see where things go. It's been disappointing for all parties. He went out to play games with Burnley and that's just not happened for him". Upon returning to Hull in January, Stewart started in a 1–1 home draw with Leyton Orient in the FA Cup, following which Bruce was critical of Stewart's match fitness. On 1 March 2013, Stewart joined Championship rivals Blackburn Rovers on loan for the remainder of the 2012–13 season. He made his debut for Michael Appleton's "Riversiders" as a second-half substitute for Danny Murphy in a 3–2 defeat to Peterborough United at Ewood Park on 2 March. After Hull City's promotion to the Premier League at the end of the 2012–13 season, Stewart was strongly linked with a move to Scottish Premier League club Celtic.

On 2 September 2013, Stewart moved on loan to Championship club Charlton Athletic until January 2014. He scored on his debut for the "Addicks" on 17 September, in a 2–1 defeat at Huddersfield Town, after coming on as a 68th-minute substitute for Richard Wood. He made his first start on 28 September against his former club Burnley, playing the first 83 minutes of a 3–0 away defeat. On 9 November, Stewart scored a volley from distance in a 4–2 defeat to Leeds United at The Valley. Speaking at the end of December, Charlton manager Chris Powell said he was optimistic of extending Stewart's stay at the club.

==== Leeds United loan ====
On 9 January 2014, Stewart signed an initial three-month emergency loan at Championship side Leeds United, with a permanent deal on a three-year contract starting at the end of the 2013–14 season; he was the first signing made by manager Brian McDermott under the brief ownership of the Sports Capital consortium. The deal was initially only on a loan basis to circumvent FIFA rules that prevented Stewart from signing a permanent contract at a club after already representing two other clubs (Hull City and Charlton Athletic) in the 2013–14 season. He made his debut for the "Whites" on 11 January, in a 6–0 defeat at Sheffield Wednesday.

He made 11 appearances during his loan spell at Elland Road, before new owner Massimo Cellino decided to cancel the permanent transfer. Stewart sued Leeds United, and was awarded £750,000 in compensation, the entirety of his three-year contract.

=== Ipswich Town ===
On 1 July 2014, Stewart joined Championship side Ipswich Town on a three-year contract. Just before the beginning of the 2014–15 season, he broke his jaw and was ruled out of action for the first six weeks of the campaign. Stewart made his debut for the "Blues" as a 62nd-minute substitute in a 1–1 draw at Southampton in the FA Cup on 4 January 2015. On 21 March, Stewart joined League One side Barnsley on loan until the end of the 2014–15 season. He made four appearances for Lee Johnson's "Tykes", before returning to Ipswich.

On 28 August 2015, Stewart joined Paul Dickov's Doncaster Rovers on loan until January. He made his debut the following day as a substitute in a 2–0 win over Fleetwood Town at the Keepmoat Stadium. On 14 January, Stewart extended his loan to the end of the 2015–16 season. He credited Rovers manager Darren Ferguson for his decision to stay on at the club, and Ferguson said that Stewart offered good cover for wing-back Felipe Mattioni. However two days later Stewart was hospitalized with whiplash after he landed on his head during a match against Gillingham. He made a total of 28 appearances for "Donny", scoring four goals, as the club were relegated out of League One. On 31 August 2016, Stewart was released by Ipswich manager Mick McCarthy, having made just two FA Cup appearances throughout his two years at Portman Road.

=== Lincoln City ===
Stewart had trials at Charlton Athletic and Port Vale during summer 2017.

On 24 October 2017, Stewart signed for Lincoln City. His contract with Lincoln was mutually terminated at the end of the 2017–18 season.

Stewart retired from professional football at the age of 28.

== International career ==
Stewart represented England at under-17, under-19 and under-20 international levels. As his family are from Glasgow, he is also eligible to play for Scotland.

== Career statistics ==
As of 5 July 2018.

Appearances and goals by club, season and competition
Club	Season	League			FA Cup		EFL Cup		Other		Total	
Club	Season	Division	Apps	Goals	Apps	Goals	Apps	Goals	Apps	Goals	Apps	Goals
Manchester United	2009–10	Premier League	0	0	0	0	0	0	0	0	0	0
Manchester United	2010–11	Premier League	0	0	0	0	0	0	0	0	0	0
Manchester United	Manchester United total		0	0	0	0	0	0	0	0	0	0
Yeovil Town (loan)	2010–11	League One	5	0	0	0	0	0	1 (Note: Appearance(s) and goal(s) in the EFL Trophy.)	0	6	0
Hull City	2010–11	Championship	14	0	1	0	0	0	0	0	15	0
Hull City	2011–12	Championship	31	1	1	1	0	0	0	0	32	2
Hull City	2012–13	Championship	2	0	3	0	2	0	0	0	7	0
Hull City	2013–14	Premier League	0	0	0	0	1	0	0	0	1	0
Hull City	Hull City total		47	1	5	1	3	0	0	0	55	2
Burnley (loan)	2012–13	Championship	9	0	0	0	0	0	0	0	9	0
Blackburn Rovers (loan)	2012–13	Championship	7	0	0	0	0	0	0	0	7	0
Charlton Athletic (loan)	2013–14	Championship	18	3	0	0	0	0	0	0	18	3
Leeds United (loan)	2013–14	Championship	11	0	0	0	0	0	0	0	11	0
Ipswich Town	2014–15	Championship	0	0	2	0	0	0	0	0	2	0
Ipswich Town	2015–16	Championship	0	0	0	0	0	0	0	0	0	0
Ipswich Town	2016–17	EFL Championship	0	0	0	0	0	0	0	0	0	0
Ipswich Town	Ipswich Town total		0	0	2	0	0	0	0	0	2	0
Barnsley (loan)	2014–15	League One	4	0	0	0	0	0	0	0	4	0
Doncaster Rovers (loan)	2015–16	League One	26	4	1	0	0	0	1	0	28	4
Lincoln City	2017–18	League Two	4	0	0	0	0	0	4	0	8	0
Lincoln City	Lincoln City total		4	0	0	0	0	0	4	0	8	0
Career total			131	8	8	1	3	0	6	0	148	9

== Honours ==
Lincoln City

- EFL Trophy: 2017–18
