= Jack Hobbs (footballer) =

English footballer (born 1988)

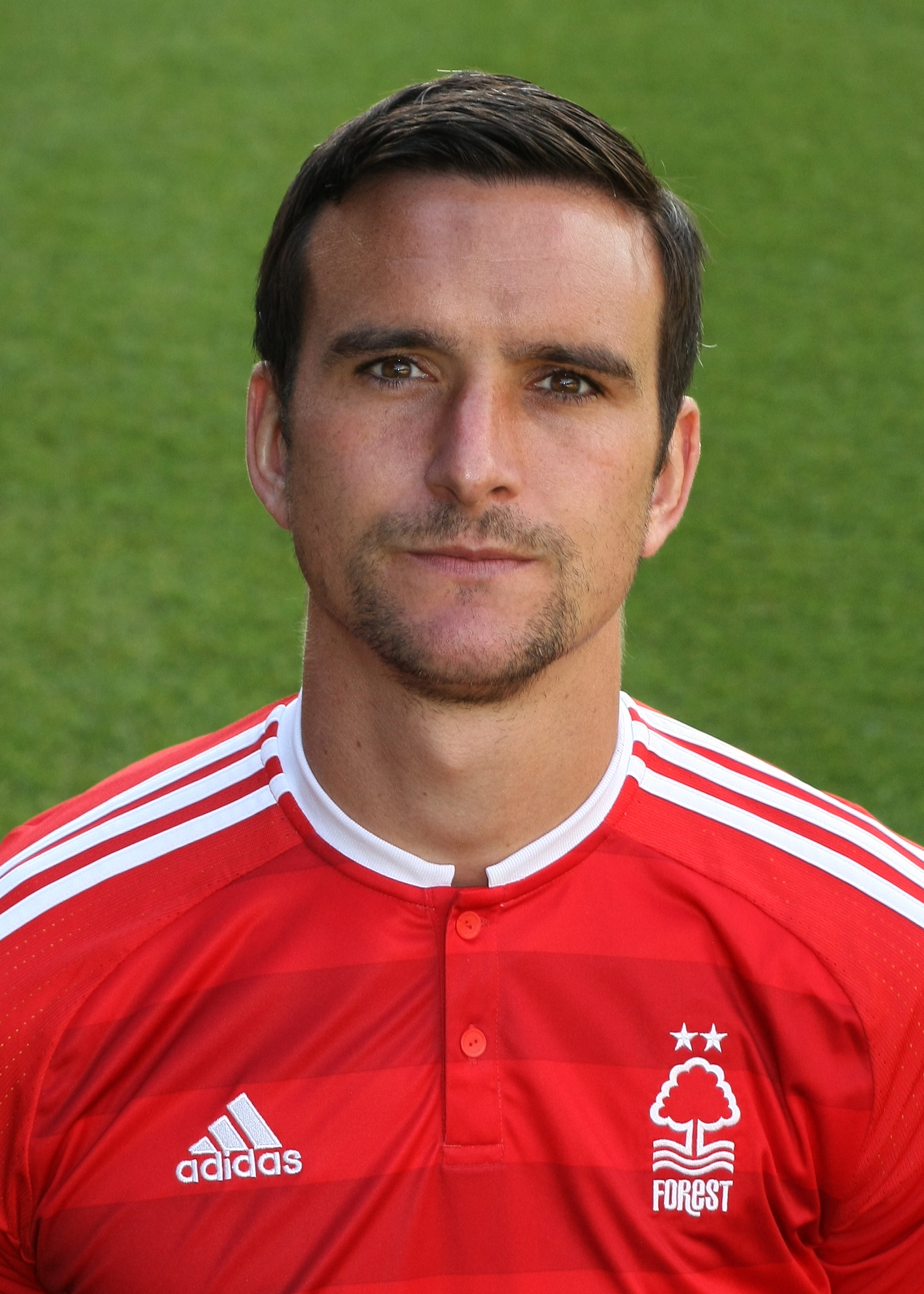
- Hobbs in Nottingham Forest kit, 2016

Personal information
- Full name: Jack Hobbs
- Date of birth: 18 August 1988 (age 38)
- Place of birth: Portsmouth, England
- Height: 6 ft 3 in (1.91 m)
- Position: Centre-back

Team information
- Current team: FCV International Football Academy (head coach)

Youth career
- –2005: Lincoln City

Senior career*
Years	Team	Apps	(Gls)
2005	Lincoln City	1	(0)
2005–2009	Liverpool	2	(0)
2008	→ Scunthorpe United (loan)	9	(1)
2008–2009	→ Leicester City (loan)	44	(1)
2009–2011	Leicester City	70	(0)
2011	→ Hull City (loan)	13	(0)
2011–2014	Hull City	62	(1)
2013–2014	→ Nottingham Forest (loan)	25	(1)
2014–2018	Nottingham Forest	50	(0)
2018–2020	Bolton Wanderers	36	(2)
Total		312	(6)

International career
2007	England U19	3	(0)
- * Club domestic league appearances and goals

Jack Hobbs (born 18 August 1988) is an English former professional footballer who played as a centre-back. He has played in the English Football League and Premier League for Lincoln City, Liverpool, Scunthorpe United, Leicester City, Hull City, Nottingham Forest and Bolton Wanderers.

A graduate of Lincoln City academy, Hobbs made one appearance for the League Two club in 2005 before signing for Liverpool of the Premier League. His playing time there was limited, so to gain first-team experience Liverpool loaned him out to Scunthorpe United and Leicester City. He signed permanently with the latter in 2009 and went on to make more than 100 appearances in three seasons with the club. Hobbs joined Hull City two years later and was club captain for the 2011–12 season. He joined Nottingham Forest in 2013, initially on loan, before signing permanently the following year. He was released in 2018, with opportunities in the team limited by persistent injuries. He then joined Bolton Wanderers before being released in 2020. Hobbs made three appearances for the England national under-19 team in 2007.

Hobbs returned to Lincoln City in September 2021 in his first coaching role, to assist with the club's academy.

== Early life ==
Hobbs was born in Portsmouth, Hampshire, and moved to the village of Moulton, Lincolnshire during his youth. A student of Spalding Grammar School, he played youth football for Moulton Harrox at the age of 10.

== Club career ==
=== Lincoln City ===
Hobbs progressed through the Lincoln City youth system and, at the age of 14, scored his first goal in his fourth appearance for the under-19 team in a 1–1 draw with Bradford City on 22 March 2003. He accepted a three-year scholarship with Lincoln in March 2004, commencing at the start of the 2004–05 season. He made his first-team debut on 15 January 2005 against Bristol Rovers, as a substitute for Matt Bloomer. At 16 years and 149 days, he became the club's youngest ever debutant, breaking a record that was previously held by Shane Nicholson.

=== Liverpool ===
At the end of the season, Hobbs entered transfer negotiations with Premier League club Arsenal. However, the deal fell through because Arsenal demanded the removal of a sell-on clause from the transfer deal. Tottenham Hotspur and Bolton Wanderers also expressed their desire to sign the defender. He eventually signed for Liverpool on his 17th birthday on 18 August 2005 on a three-year professional contract. Commenting on the transfer, he said: "This is unbelievable. I'm still pinching myself and it is a real opportunity for me." He made his debut for the reserve team in a 3–2 defeat to Everton. Praising his performance, coach Hugh McAuley said that he played "very well". He was also a part of the reserve squad which won the 2005–06 FA Youth Cup by beating Manchester City 3–2 in the final.

Hobbs made his debut on 25 September 2007 as a substitute against Reading in the League Cup in a 4–3 win. He made his first start for Liverpool against Cardiff City in the League Cup on 31 October, playing all 90 minutes, and gaining praise from pundits and teammates for his composed performance. On 2 December, Hobbs made his league debut against Bolton Wanderers, replacing Jamie Carragher in the 51st minute of a 4–0 home win. Six days later, he made his first league start in a 3–1 defeat away to Reading. On 25 January 2008, he signed for Championship club Scunthorpe United on loan until the end of the 2007–08 season. He scored the first goal of his career on 15 February with a header from Ian Morris' cross in the 23rd minute of a 3–2 defeat away to Stoke City. In his spell with Scunthorpe, Hobbs made nine appearances, scoring one goal.

=== Leicester City ===
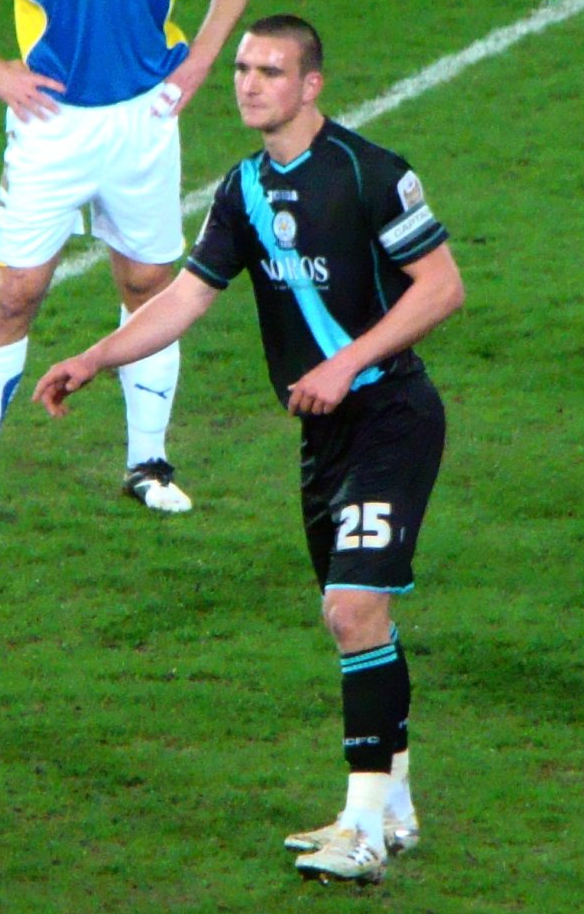
Hobbs playing for Leicester City in 2010

On 16 May 2008, BBC Sport wrote that Hobbs was indecisive about whether to fight for first-team opportunities at Liverpool or to join another club for more playing opportunities. On 25 May, Hobbs signed for League One club Leicester City on loan for the 2008–09 season. On joining the club, he said he wanted to help Leicester win promotion to the Championship. He made his debut on 9 August in a 2–0 victory over Milton Keynes Dons, when he came on as an 88th-minute substitute for Aleksandar Tunchev. Hobbs scored his first goal on 24 January 2009, with a header from Steve Howard's flick-on in a 4–2 victory over Huddersfield Town. He was red carded on 21 February in a match against Bristol Rovers for fouling Darryl Duffy. However, the resultant penalty by Rickie Lambert was saved by Mark Bunn. Leicester manager Nigel Pearson commented that the red card was unfortunate, as he believed the foul was not intentional. In his first season with the club, besides winning the League One title and achieving promotion to the Championship, Hobbs was also included in the PFA Team of the Year. He was also voted as the club's Young Player of the Year, as he made 44 appearances, in which his team conceded 37 goals.

Hobbs signed for Leicester City permanently on 24 April 2009 on a four-year contract. After signing, he said that he believed that with Leicester he could win promotion to the Premier League. He made his first appearance after signing permanently on 8 August against Swansea City in a 2–1 home victory. Playing alongside Wayne Brown at centre-back, Hobbs missed only two league matches in the 2009–10 season, and made a total of 49 appearances. At the end of the season, he won the Player of the Year award, and shared the Players' Player of the Year award with Andy King. On being named Player of the Year, Hobbs said that he was honoured to win award.

=== Hull City ===
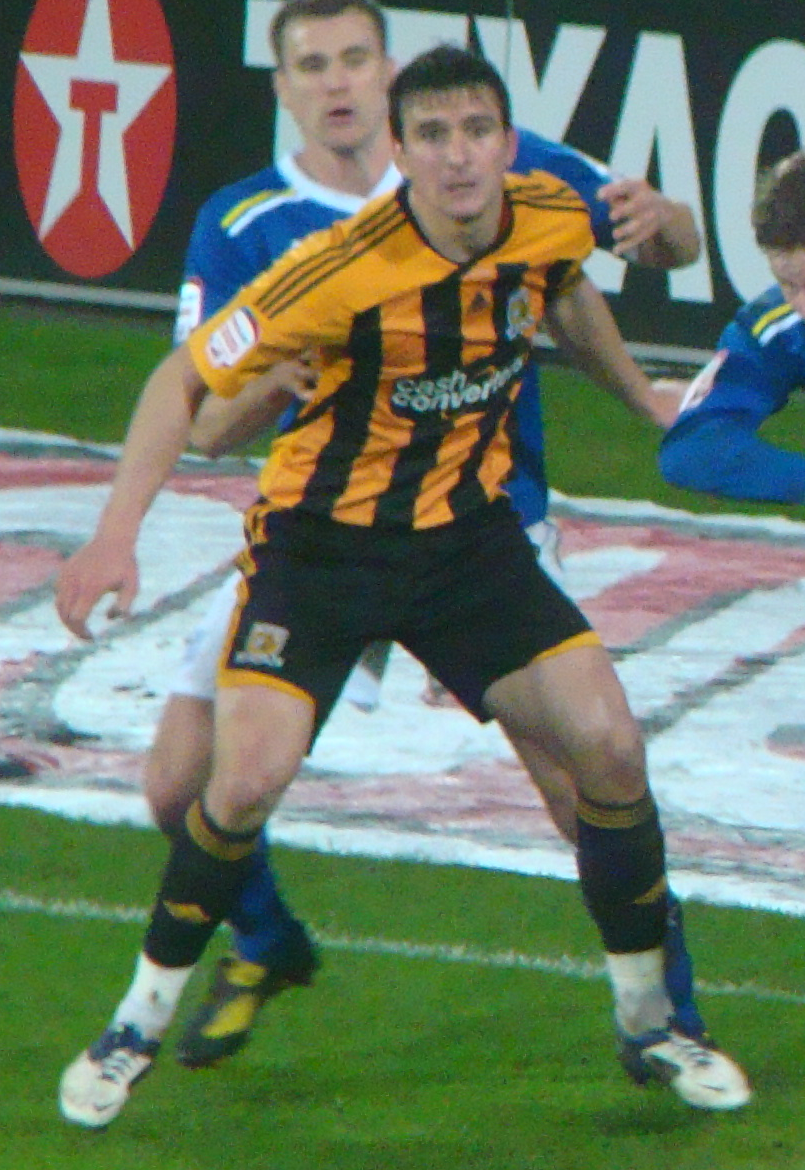
Hobbs playing for Hull City in 2012

In the 2010–11 season, Hobbs played 30 times for Leicester City. However, with the arrival of Sol Bamba, he found his playing time increasingly limited. With speculation that Leicester would sign Chelsea defender Jeffrey Bruma on loan, new manager Sven-Göran Eriksson said that Hobbs could join another club. He joined Leicester's fellow Championship club Hull City on 15 February 2011 on loan for the rest of the 2010–11 season. He made his debut a week later in a 1–0 away win against Derby County. Failing to break into the team due to competition from James Chester and Anthony Gerrard, Hobbs expressed his desire to return to Leicester once the loan spell ended. Nevertheless, he made 13 appearances for Hull during his loan spell.

On 30 June 2011, Hobbs signed for Hull permanently on a three-year contract. BBC Sport reported the transfer fee as an initial £850,000, potentially rising to £1 million in add-ons. He was also appointed as club captain for the 2011–12 season. Hobbs made his debut as a permanent Hull player on 5 August in a 1–0 home defeat to Blackpool. On 11 February 2012, he scored his first league goal in three years in a 3–0 home victory over Bristol City, heading in a Robert Koren cross. During a match against Coventry City on 31 March, he injured himself while tackling Alex Nimely during first-half stoppage time. Two days later, it was announced that Hobbs would miss the rest of the season owing to the knee injury sustained during the match.

Recovering from injury, Hobbs made his return to the team on 9 December 2012 in a 2–1 defeat away to Watford, pairing with Alex Bruce at centre-back. He played 22 times for the club in the 2012–13 season, which saw Hull City promoted to the Premier League as Championship runners-up.

=== Nottingham Forest ===
After Hull City were promoted to the Premier League, the club informed Hobbs that he was no longer required. In July 2013, Sky Sports reported that Championship club Nottingham Forest were interested in signing him. He signed a loan deal with Nottingham Forest on 16 July 2013, with a condition that it become permanent on a two-year contract at the end of the 2013–14 season. Hobbs said that it would be an honour for him "to play for a club the size of Nottingham Forest". He made his debut on 3 August in a 1–0 home victory over Huddersfield Town. He scored his first goal on 28 September in a 1–0 home victory over Derby County, heading in an Andy Reid corner before half-time. On 24 January 2014, Hull recalled him because of an injury to defender James Chester. However, on 31 January, Hobbs signed permanently for Nottingham Forest on a four-and-a-half-year contract, for a fee reported by Sky Sports to be worth "close to £1million". After signing, he played twice before being ruled out of the rest of the season in March due to an ankle fracture.

In August 2014, Hobbs played his first match after his injury for the reserve team in a 0–0 draw against Burton Albion. However, he injured himself during the East Midlands derby against Derby County in September. In the following month he underwent surgery which ruled him out of action for three months. On 14 February 2015, during a 4–4 draw against Blackpool, he suffered a hamstring injury and was ruled out of play for a month. The club's manager Dougie Freedman blamed the condition of the Bloomfield Road pitch for the injury. After recovering from his injury, he played the whole 90 minutes of a match against Brentford in April.

Hobbs played his first match of the 2015–16 season on 7 August 2015 in a match against Brighton & Hove Albion. Though the match ended in a 1–0 defeat for Forest, he formed a strong defensive partnership along with Matt Mills. On 28 November, he received a red card in the 66th minute of a 3–1 win against Reading for a challenge on Matěj Vydra. He made a total of 23 appearances during the season.

Hobbs was dropped from the first team in the first half of the 2016–17 season by manager Philippe Montanier, but was reinstated after Montanier was replaced by caretaker manager Gary Brazil. On 26 December, he played his first match of the season, starting in a 2–1 away defeat against Huddersfield Town. He played this match after recovering from "several niggling injuries". Hobbs played a total of 10 matches in the season.

He was released by Forest at the end of the 2017–18 season.

=== Bolton Wanderers ===
Hobbs signed a one-year contract with Championship club Bolton Wanderers on 30 July 2018 following a successful trial. He scored his first goal for Bolton in a 1–1 draw with Reading on 29 January 2019. Hobbs left Bolton at the end of the 2018–19 season, but re-signed for the club on 30 August. He had agreed a contract months before, but had to wait for Bolton to come out of administration to re-sign. He was released at the end of the 2019–20 season.

== International career ==
Hobbs made three appearances for the England national under-19 team, playing in all of their matches as they failed to qualify for the 2007 UEFA European Under-19 Championship in the elite qualification stage.

== Coaching career ==
Hobbs was appointed as an assistant coach with Lincoln City's academy on 17 September 2021, working with the academy's shadow scholarship programme.

== Career statistics ==
Appearances and goals by club, season and competition
Club	Season	League			FA Cup		League Cup		Other		Total	
Club	Season	Division	Apps	Goals	Apps	Goals	Apps	Goals	Apps	Goals	Apps	Goals
Lincoln City	2004–05	League Two	1	0	0	0	0	0	—		1	0
Liverpool	2005–06	Premier League	0	0	0	0	0	0	0	0	0	0
Liverpool	2006–07	Premier League	0	0	0	0	0	0	0	0	0	0
Liverpool	2007–08	Premier League	2	0	0	0	3	0	0	0	5	0
Liverpool	Total		2	0	0	0	3	0	0	0	5	0
Scunthorpe United (loan)	2007–08	Championship	9	1	—		—		—		9	1
Leicester City (loan)	2008–09	League One	44	1	2	0	1	0	2 (Note: Appearance(s) in Football League/EFL Trophy)	0	49	1
Leicester City	2009–10	Championship	44	0	2	0	1	0	2 (Note: Appearances in Championship play-offs)	0	49	0
Leicester City	2010–11	Championship	26	0	2	0	2	0	—		30	0
Leicester City	Total		114	1	6	0	4	0	4	0	128	1
Hull City (loan)	2010–11	Championship	13	0	—		—		—		13	0
Hull City	2011–12	Championship	40	1	2	0	1	0	—		43	1
Hull City	2012–13	Championship	22	0	0	0	0	0	—		22	0
Hull City	Total		75	1	2	0	1	0	—		78	1
Nottingham Forest	2013–14	Championship	27	1	1	0	1	0	—		29	1
Nottingham Forest	2014–15	Championship	17	0	1	0	1	0	—		19	0
Nottingham Forest	2015–16	Championship	20	0	2	0	1	0	—		23	0
Nottingham Forest	2016–17	Championship	9	0	1	0	0	0	—		10	0
Nottingham Forest	2017–18	Championship	2	0	0	0	3	0	—		4	0
Nottingham Forest	Total		75	1	5	0	6	0	—		86	1
Bolton Wanderers	2018–19	Championship	25	1	1	0	1	0	0	0	27	1
Bolton Wanderers	2019–20	League One	11	1	0	0	0	0	1	0	12	1
Bolton Wanderers	Total		36	2	1	0	1	0	1	0	39	2
Career total			312	6	14	0	15	0	5	0	346	6

== Honours ==
Liverpool

- FA Youth Cup: 2005–06

Leicester City

- Football League One: 2008–09

Individual

- PFA Team of the Year: 2008–09 League One
- Leicester City Fan's Player of the Year: 2009–10
- Leicester City Players' Player of the Year: 2009–10
