= 2008–09 Hull City A.F.C. season =

English football club season

Hull City
2008–09 season
- Chairman: Paul Duffen
- Manager: Phil Brown
- Stadium: KC Stadium
- Premier League: 17th
- FA Cup: Sixth round
- League Cup: Second round
- Top goalscorer: League: Geovanni (8); All: Geovanni (8)
- Highest home attendance: 24,945 (vs. Manchester United)
- Lowest home attendance: 24,282 (vs. Wigan Athletic)
- Average home league attendance: 24,816
Home colours	Away colours	Third colours

The 2008–09 season was Hull City's first ever season in the English top flight and, by extension, the Premier League. Home games were played at the KC Stadium, which has a capacity of 25,404. On Friday 6 June 2008 Hull City announced they had sold out all 20,500 season tickets. Hull City's first ever top-flight fixture was a home game against Fulham, which they won 2–1. City finished the season in 17th place in the table, successfully avoiding relegation by the narrow margin of one point over Newcastle United. In the FA Cup, Hull reached the quarterfinals stage for the first time in 38 years, where they were knocked out by Arsenal with a controversial offside goal.

== Players ==
=== Squad ===
Updated 24 May 2009.

Note: Flags indicate national team as defined under FIFA eligibility rules; some limited exceptions apply. Players may hold more than one non-FIFA nationality.

No.	Pos.	Nation	Player
1	GK	WAL	Boaz Myhill
2	DF	ENG	Nathan Doyle
3	DF	ENG	Andy Dawson
4	MF	ENG	Ian Ashbee (captain)
6	DF	ENG	Michael Turner
7	FW	ENG	Craig Fagan
8	MF	ENG	Nick Barmby
9	FW	ENG	Dean Windass
10	MF	BRA	Geovanni
11	MF	ENG	Bryan Hughes
12	GK	ENG	Matt Duke
13	MF	ENG	Ryan France
14	MF	AUS	Richard Garcia
15	DF	FRA	Bernard Mendy
16	MF	HUN	Péter Halmosi
17	MF	IRL	Kevin Kilbane
18	FW	IRL	Caleb Folan
19	MF	ENG	John Welsh
20	MF	NED	George Boateng

No.	Pos.	Nation	Player
21	DF	WAL	Sam Ricketts
22	MF	ENG	Dean Marney
24	DF	GUI	Kamil Zayatte
25	FW	GAB	Daniel Cousin
26	GK	TTO	Tony Warner
27	FW	ENG	Nicky Featherstone
28	FW	ANG	Manucho (on loan from Manchester United)
29	DF	ENG	Matty Plummer
30	DF	ENG	Anthony Gardner
31	MF	ENG	Will Atkinson
32	MF	ENG	James Bennett
33	MF	ENG	Jimmy Bullard
35	DF	SCO	Liam Cooper
36	MF	IRL	Jamie Devitt
38	DF	ENG	Joe Lamplough
39	DF	ENG	Steve Gardner
42	FW	ENG	Ryan Kendall
43	GK	ENG	Tom Woodhead
—	FW	ENG	Michael Bridges

== Transfers ==
=== In ===
Date	Position	Player	Club From	Transfer Fee	Reference
2 July 2008	FW	Craig Fagan	Derby County	£750,000	
5 July 2008	FW	Geovanni	Manchester City	Free	
11 July 2008	DF	Bernard Mendy	Paris Saint-Germain	Free	
16 July 2008	MF	Peter Halmosi	Plymouth Argyle	£2,000,000	
16 July 2008	MF	George Boateng	Middlesbrough	£1.000.000	
16 July 2008	GK	Tony Warner	Fulham	Free	
29 July 2008	DF	Anthony Gardner	Tottenham Hotspur	Loan (made permanent 14 August for £2,500,000)	
8 August 2008	GK	Mark Oxley	Rotherham United	£150,000	
14 August 2008	FW	Marlon King	Wigan Athletic	Loan	
30 August 2008	DF	Paul McShane	Sunderland	Loan	
31 August 2008	DF	Kamil Zayatte	Young Boys	Loan (made permanent 14 October for £2,500,000)	
1 September 2008	FW	Daniel Cousin	Rangers	Undisclosed	
23 September 2008	FW	Stelios Giannakopoluos	Free Agent	Free	
14 January 2009	FW	Manucho	Manchester United	Loan	
15 January 2009	MF	Kevin Kilbane	Wigan Athletic	Undisclosed	
23 January 2009	MF	Jimmy Bullard	Fulham	£5,000,000	

=== Out ===
Date	Position	Player	Club To	Transfer Fee	Reference
1 July 2008	MF	Jay-Jay Okocha	Free Agency	Released	
3 July 2008	MF	David Livermore	Brighton and Hove Albion	Free	
5 July 2008	FW	Henrik Pedersen	Silkeborg IF	Free	
	MF	Stuart Elliott	Doncaster Rovers		
24 July 2008	FW	Michael Bridges	Carlisle United	Loan	
9 January 2009	FW	Dean Windass	Oldham Athletic	Loan	
22 January 2009	FW	Stelios Giannakopoluos	Larissa	Free	
30 January 2009	DF	Wayne Brown	Leicester City	Loan	

== Pre-season ==
=== Pre-season training ===
Hull were one of the first Premier League clubs to start pre-season training. Between 4 and 11 July Hull trained in Bormio, Italy.

=== Preseason friendlies ===
Date	Opponents	H / A	Result	Scorers	Attendance	Notes
14 July	North Ferriby	A	0–4	Dean Marney, Will Atkinson, Michael Turner, Nicky Barmby	2,500
15 July	Winterton Rangers	A	0–4	Geovanni, Delron Buckley, John Welsh, Joe Lamplough	??
19 July	K.V. Oostende	A	1–1	Geovanni, Thor Laleman	???
22 July	Chesterfield	A	0–3	Geovanni, Dean Windass, Caleb Folan	???
26 July	Crewe Alexandra	A	4–0	Calvin Zola 3, Nicky Maynard	???
29 July	Oldham	A	1–1	Caleb Folan, Lewis Alessandra	???
3 August	Hearts	A	1–0	Ksanavicius	???
9 August	CA Osasuna	H	0–1	Santiago Ezquerro	???

== Premier League ==
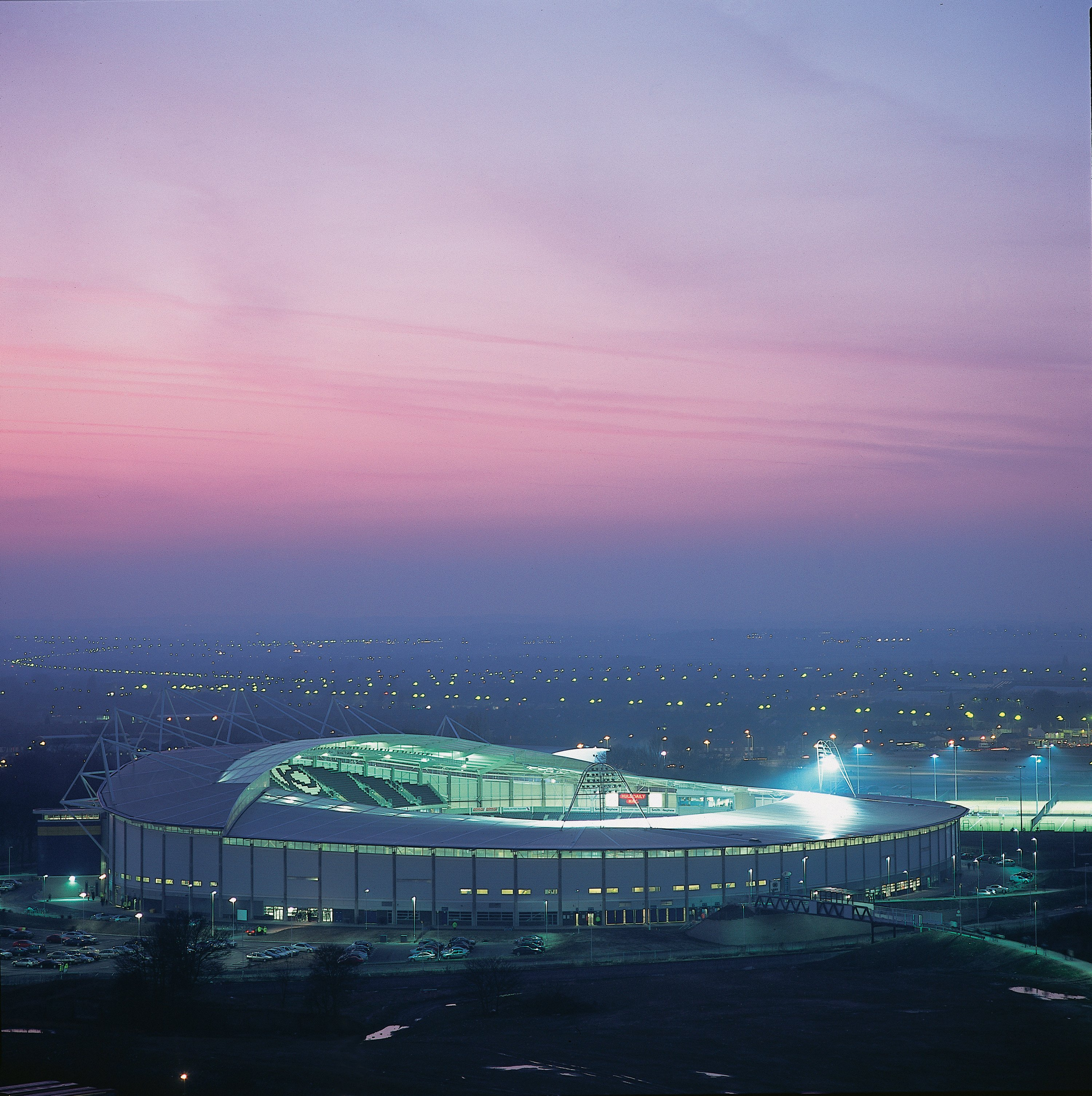
KC Stadium where Hull play their Premier League home games

=== August–December ===
Hull's Premier League opener was at home to Fulham. Hull started rather poorly and went behind after eight minutes from a Seol Ki-Hyeon header. Hull's comeback came when Geovanni scored from a shot from outside the box, the goal was Hull's first Premier League goal and Geovanni's first as a Hull player. In the second half Hull scored the winner from substitute Caleb Folan's shot when he slotted the ball into the net from Craig Fagan's low cross. Hull won the game putting them joint top of the league. Hull's second game was away against Blackburn Rovers. The home team scored first when Jason Roberts made it 1–0 in the 39th minute. Hull came back to get a draw; before half time Australian Richard Garcia scored with a header from a Craig Fagan cross. There followed a home game against Wigan which turned out to be a heavy 0–5 defeat. Sam Ricketts turned a corner from Kevin Kilbane in to his own net after 5 minutes to open the scoring. Antonio Valencia scored after 13 minutes and provided the cross for Amr Zaki to stroke home in the second half. Five minutes later Emile Heskey scored from a poor clearance by Wayne Brown. Nine minutes from time Amr Zaki drove in off the crossbar to inflict the first defeat of the season on Hull.

An away game at managerless Newcastle United followed. Nicky Butt's foul on Péter Halmosi resulted in a penalty which Marlon King converted to open the scoring for City. He slotted home a second goal 10 minutes into the second half. Newcastle tried to get back into the match and a Charles N'Zogbia shot rebounded off the post to Xisco who finished to make the score 1–2. As full-time approached, Danny Guthrie was sent off for a foul on Craig Fagan, which broke Fagan's leg. The final score was a 1–2 City victory.

A home game against Everton followed in which City took the lead from a Dean Marney corner which was headed home by Michael Turner. Early in the second half another Dean Marney corner was turned in by Phil Neville for an own goal. Everton pulled one back when a Tim Cahill shot bounced in off the crossbar. They drew level minutes later when Leon Osman scored from close range to secure a 2–2 draw.

A trip to Arsenal provided a test for the City but they withstood the pressure during the first half. Following the restart the home team were soon in front when a Cesc Fàbregas shot found the net after deflecting off Paul McShane. City responded with a 25-yard (23 m) shot by Geovanni quickly followed by a Daniel Cousin header from an Andy Dawson corner. Arsenal's William Gallas hit the crossbar and Boaz Myhill saved a late shot from Cesc Fàbregas to give the visitors a 1–2 victory.

A further away game at Tottenham Hotspur followed. City raced into the lead with a 30-yard (27 m) free kick by Geovanni after just nine minutes. Tottenham's Gareth Bale and Jonathan Woodgate hit the woodwork, as did Dean Marney before half time. Neither side managed to score in the second half giving City a 0–1 victory.

After a break for internationals a home game against West Ham United was next up. City's Marlon King created the first opportunity with a cross to Daniel Cousin who volleyed just passed the post. At the other end Carlton Cole shot straight at Boaz Myhill. Dean Marney came close twice for City before Hérita Ilunga headed wide, Valon Behrami shot past the post and Craig Bellamy shot over the crossbar. The game was goalless at half time. Soon after the restart, a corner by Andy Dawson was headed home by Michael Turner to open the scoring. Carlton Cole nearly levelled immediately but his shot came off the crossbar. Kamil Zayatte almost had a second for Hull but shot over the bar leaving Hull with a 1–0 victory over the visitors.

An away match at West Bromwich Albion was the next action by the Tigers. Albion opened the stronger, with Ishmael Miller being blocked by Andy Dawson who picked up an injury which saw him being substituted for Sam Ricketts after only 10 minutes. Albion's Borja Valero had a shot that was saved by Boaz Myhill, Jonas Olsson hitting the rebound off the crossbar for Roman Bednář to miss the second rebound. On a break City gained a corner but Kamil Zayatte headed wide. A Daniel Cousin shot was deflected and Scott Carson scooped the ball off the line to leave the game goalless at half time. Soon after the restart City gained a corner and Kamil Zayatte volleyed home. Albion's Ryan Donk and James Morrison had shots saved before Marlon King put the ball into the area for a diving Geovanni to head in. Minutes later Marlon King was also on the score sheet after slotting in to the corner of the net, leaving it another away victory of 0–3 for City.

A mid-week home game against leaders Chelsea followed, with a record crowd at the KC Stadium. Chelsea were soon in the lead when Frank Lampard lobbed in. Soon after the break indecision in the City defence allowed Nicolas Anelka to run in and slot home. After missing several attempts Florent Malouda finally scored from six yards from a Ricardo Carvalho cross. City lost 0–3 in a match which could have been an even heavier defeat.

Then on 1 November the Tigers travelled to Old Trafford to play Manchester United away from home. The match was gripping, and after 3 minutes United scored only to be brought back to earth by the Tigers free kick headed in by Daniel Cousin. United went on to score a further 3 goals, but after half time the Tigers scored two more goals in the final few minutes through Bernard Mendy and Giovanni. The final score was 4–3 to Manchester United.

=== Results ===
Date	Opponents	H / A	Result	Scorers	Attendance	Notes
16 August	Fulham	H	2–1	Seol (8), Geovanni (22), Folan (81)	24,525
23 August	Blackburn Rovers	A	1–1	Roberts (39), Garcia (40)	22,618
30 August	Wigan Athletic	H	0–5	Ricketts (5) og, Valencia (13), Zaki (63), Heskey (68), Zaki (81)	24,282
13 September	Newcastle United	A	1–2	King (34) pen, (55), Xisco (82)	50,242
21 September	Everton	H	2–2	Turner (18), Neville (50) og, Cahill (73), Osman (78)	24,845
27 September	Arsenal	A	1–2	McShane (51) og, Geovanni (62), Cousin (66)	60,037
5 October	Tottenham Hotspur	A	0–1	Geovanni (9)	36,062
19 October	West Ham United	H	1–0	Turner (51)	24,896
25 October	West Bromwich Albion	A	0–3	Zayatte (47), Geovanni (62), King (66)	26,323
29 October	Chelsea	H	0–3	Lampard (3), Anelka (50), Malouda (75)	24,906
1 November	Manchester United	A	4–3	Ronaldo (3), Cousin (23), Carrick (29), Ronaldo (44), Vidić (57), Mendy (69), Geovanni (82) pen	75,398
8 November	Bolton Wanderers	H	0–1	Taylor (50)	24,903
16 November	Manchester City	H	2–2	Cousin (14), Ireland (37), (45), Geovanni (60)	24,902
22 November	Portsmouth	A	2–2	Crouch (20), Turner (54), Johnson (63), Windass (89)^{[a]}	20,240
29 November	Stoke City	A	1–1	King (45), Fuller (73) pen	27,500
6 December	Middlesbrough	H	2–1	Tuncay (79), Turnbull (82) og, King (85) pen	24,912
13 December	Liverpool	A	2–2	McShane (12), Carragher (22) og, Gerrard (24), (32)	43,835
20 December	Sunderland	H	1–4	Malbranque (10), Barmby (19), Zayatte (78) og, Jones (84), Cissé (90)	24,917
26 December	Manchester City	A	5–1	Caicedo (15,27), Robinho (28,36), Fagan (80), Ireland (82)	45,196
30 December	Aston Villa	H	0–1	Zayatte (88) og	24,727
10 January	Everton	A	2–0	Fellaini (18), Arteta (45)	37,527
17 January	Arsenal	H	1–3	Adebayor (30), Cousin (65), Nasri (82), Bendtner (86)	24,924
28 January	West Ham United	A	2–0	Di Michele (33), Cole (51)	34,340
31 January	West Bromwich Albion	H	2–2	Mendy (44), Simpson (53), Fagan (69), Brunt (73) pen	24,879
7 February	Chelsea	A	0–0		41,802
23 February	Tottenham Hotspur	H	1–2	Lennon (17), Turner (27), Woodgate (86)	24,742
1 March	Blackburn Rovers	H	1–2	Warnock (34), Andrews (37), Ashbee (79)	24,612
4 March	Fulham	A	0–1	Manucho (90)	23,051
14 March	Newcastle United	H	1–1	Geovanni (9), S. Taylor (38)	24,914
22 March	Wigan Athletic	A	1–0	Watson (84)	17,689
4 April	Portsmouth	H	0–0		24,802
11 April	Middlesbrough	A	3–1	Tuncay (3), Manucho (9), Bates (29), King (90)	32,255
18 April	Sunderland	A	1–0	Cissé (45)	42,855
25 April	Liverpool	H	1–3	Alonso (45), Kuyt (63), Geovanni (72), Kuyt (89)	24,942
4 May	Aston Villa	A	1–0	Carew (34)	39,604
9 May	Stoke City	H	1–2	Fuller (41), Lawrence (73), Dawson (90+5)	24,932
16 May	Bolton Wanderers	A	1–1	Steinsson (26), Fagan (47)	25,085
24 May	Manchester United	H	0–1	Gibson (24)	24,945

^{a} Goal originally attributed as an own goal by Pamarot but later awarded to Windass after a review by the Dubious Goals Committee.

=== Results by round ===
Round	1	2	3	4	5	6	7	8	9	10	11	12	13	14	15	16	17	18	19	20	21	22	23	24	25	26	27	28	29	30	31	32	33	34	35	36	37	38
Ground	H	A	H	A	H	A	A	H	A	H	A	H	H	A	A	H	A	H	A	H	A	H	A	H	A	H	H	A	H	A	H	A	A	H	A	H	A	H
Result	W	D	L	W	D	W	W	W	W	L	L	L	D	D	D	W	D	L	L	L	L	L	L	D	D	L	L	W	D	L	D	L	L	L	L	L	D	L
Position	3	3	9	4	7	6	3	3	3	5	6	6	6	6	6	5	6	6	8	8	8	8	10	11	12	13	13	12	12	13	15	16	16	17	17	18	17	17

Updated to match(es) played on 30 May 2009. Source: Hull City Results
A = Away; H = Home; W = Win; D = Draw; L = Loss

=== Final league table ===
Pos	Team	Pld	W	D	L	GF	GA	GD	Pts	Qualification or relegation
15	Blackburn Rovers	38	10	11	17	40	60	−20	41	
16	Sunderland	38	9	9	20	34	54	−20	36	
17	Hull City	38	8	11	19	39	64	−25	35	
18	Newcastle United (R)	38	7	13	18	40	59	−19	34	Relegation to Football League Championship
19	Middlesbrough (R)	38	7	11	20	28	57	−29	32	Relegation to Football League Championship

Source: Barclays Premier League
Rules for classification: 1) points; 2) goal difference; 3) number of goals scored.
(R) Relegated

=== Records ===
Top Goalscorer
Geovanni – 8

Assists
Bernard Mendy – 6

Appearances
Michael Turner – 38
(Turner was one of only two outfield players in the Premier League to play every minute of every game)

Attendance
Average: 24,816
Highest: 24,945 vs. Manchester United
Lowest: 24,282 vs. Wigan Athletic

== Squad statistics ==
Updated 16 May 2009.

No.	Pos.	Name	League		FA Cup		League Cup		Total		Discipline	
No.	Pos.	Name	Apps	Goals	Apps	Goals	Apps	Goals	Apps	Goals	Yellow card	Red card
1	GK	(Wales) Boaz Myhill	28	0	3	0	0	0	31	0	2	0
2	DF	(England) Nathan Doyle	2+1	0	3	0	1	0	6+1	0	0	0
3	DF	(England) Andy Dawson	25	1	3	0	0	0	28	1	8	0
4	MF	(England) Ian Ashbee	31	1	2+1	1	0	0	33+1	2	10	0
5	DF	(England) Wayne Brown	1	0	0	0	1	0	2	0	1	0
6	DF	(England) Michael Turner	38	4	4	1	0+1	0	42+1	5	3	0
7	FW	(England) Craig Fagan	15+7	3	3	0	0	0	18+7	3	9	0
8	MF	(England) Nick Barmby	13+8	1	2+1	1	1	0	16+9	2	2	0
9	FW	(England) Dean Windass	1+4	1	0	0	1	1	2+4	2	2	0
10	MF	(Brazil) Geovanni	32+2	8	3	0	0	0	35+2	8	3	0
11	MF	(England) Bryan Hughes	1+5	0	0+1	0	1	0	2+6	0	0	0
12	GK	(England) Matt Duke	10	0	2	0	1	0	13	0	0	0
13	MF	(England) Ryan France	1+1	0	2+2	0	1	0	4+3	0	1	0
14	MF	(Australia) Richard Garcia	13+10	1	3+1	0	0	0	16+11	1	2	0
15	DF	(France) Bernard Mendy	15+13	2	2+2	0	1	0	18+15	2	6	0
16	MF	(Hungary) Péter Halmosi	4+14	0	4+1	1	1	0	9+15	1	3	0
17	DF	(Republic of Ireland) Paul McShane	17	1	2	0	0	0	19	1	3	0
17	MF	(Republic of Ireland) Kevin Kilbane	15+1	0	0	0	0	0	15+1	0	1	0
18	FW	(Republic of Ireland) Caleb Folan	2+13	1	2+2	0	1	0	5+15	1	2	1
19	MF	(England) John Welsh	0	0	0	0	0	0	0	0	0	0
20	MF	(Netherlands) George Boateng	21+2	0	2	0	0	0	23+2	0	6	0
21	DF	(Wales) Sam Ricketts	27+2	0	6	0	0	0	33+2	0	7	1
22	MF	(England) Dean Marney	26+5	0	4	0	0	0	30+5	0	6	1
23	FW	(Jamaica) Marlon King	19+1	5	0+1	0	0+1	0	19+3	5	1	0
24	DF	(Guinea) Kamil Zayatte	31+1	1	5	1	0	0	36+1	2	7	0
25	FW	(Gabon) Daniel Cousin	18+9	4	3	1	0	0	21+9	5	1	0
26	GK	(Trinidad and Tobago) Tony Warner	0	0	1	0	0	0	0	1	0	0
27	FW	(England) Nicky Featherstone	0	0	0+1	0	0+1	0	0+2	0	0	0
28	FW	(Angola) Manucho	6+7	2	2+2	0	0	0	8+9	1	1	0
29	DF	(England) Matt Plummer	0	0	0	0	0	0	0	0	0	0
30	DF	(England) Anthony Gardner	6	0	2	0	0	0	8	0	0	0
31	MF	(England) Will Atkinson	0	0	0	0	0	0	0	0	0	0
32	MF	(England) James Bennett	0	0	0	0	0	0	0	0	0	0
33	MF	(Greece) Stelios Giannakopoulos	0+2	0	1	0	0	0	1+2	0	1	0
33	MF	(England) Jimmy Bullard	0+1	0	0	0	0	0	0+1	0	0	0
35	DF	(Scotland) Liam Cooper	0	0	0	0	1	0	1	0	0	0
36	MF	(England) Jamie Devitt	0	0	0	0	0	0	0	0	0	0
37	FW	(England) Bill Law	0	0	0	0	0	0	0	0	0	0
38	DF	(England) Joe Lamplough	0	0	0	0	0	0	0	0	0	0
39	DF	(England) Steve Gardner	0	0	0	0	0	0	0	0	0	0
42	FW	(England) Ryan Kendall	0	0	0	0	0	0	0	0	0	0
43	GK	(England) Tom Woodhead	0	0	0	0	0	0	0	0	0	0
—	GK	(England) Mark Oxley	0	0	0	0	0	0	0	0	0	0

=== Starting 11 ===
Considering starts in all competitions

No.	Pos.	Nat.	Name	MS	Notes
1	GK	(Wales)	Boaz Myhill	31	
21	RB	(Wales)	Sam Ricketts	33	
6	CB	(England)	Michael Turner	42	
24	CB	(Guinea)	Kamil Zayatte	36	
3	LB	(England)	Andy Dawson	28	
22	CM	(England)	Dean Marney	30	
4	CM	(England)	Ian Ashbee	33	
20	CM	(Netherlands)	George Boateng	23	
10	AM	(Brazil)	Geovanni	35	
23	CF	(Jamaica)	Marlon King	19	Paul McShane has 19 starts
25	CF	(Gabon)	Daniel Cousin	21	

== Awards ==
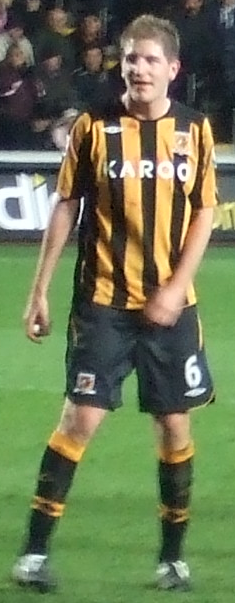
Michael Turner, Player of the year 2008–09

Michael Turner was once again named as player of the year, as well as players' player of the year, Hull City Official Supporters Club's player of the year, and CITY Magazine player of the year. Ian Ashbee came second and Geovanni came third, with Geovanni's goal against Arsenal being voted goal of the season.

== Non-playing staff ==
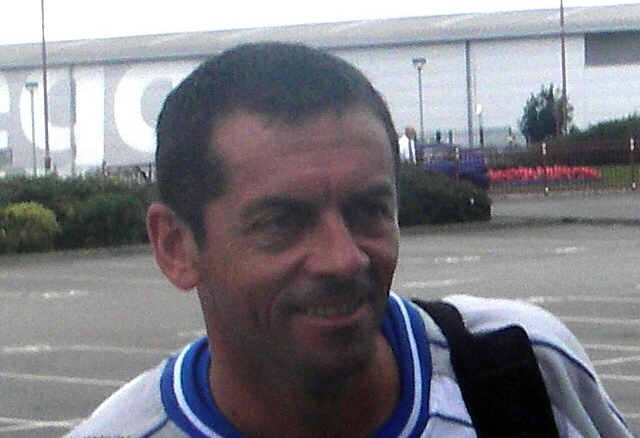
Phil Brown, manager of Hull City

Updated 15 May 2008.

- Manager: Phil Brown
- Assistant Manager: Brian Horton
- First Team Coach: Steve Parkin
- Goalkeeping Coach: Mark Prudhoe
- Fitness Coordinator: Sean Rush
- Under-23 Development Coach: Trevor Morgan
- Head of Youth: Billy Russell
- Youth Recruitment Officer: Neil Mann
- Centre of Excellence Director/FITC Officer: John Davies
- Team Surgeon: Christer Rolf
- Team Doctor: Russell Young
- Head Physiotherapist: Simon Maltby
- Assistant Physiotherapist: Liam McGarry
- Kit Manager: Barry Lowe
- Chief Scout: Bob Shaw

== Kits ==
For the 2008–09 season Hull used the most common black and amber stripes as their home kit. They used a flint coloured shirt as their away shirt. As the flint away kit clashed with Newcastle United's black and white home kit, Hull had to borrow white shorts and socks from their opponents. The teams met again in the FA Cup so to avoid a similar incident, Hull wore the previous season's all-white away kit in the replay at St James' Park. The goalkeeper kit was light blue, a similar colour had been used as an away shirt in previous seasons. Hull's kit was produced by Umbro and the home shirt had Karoo printed on the front as the sponsor, as did the goalkeeper's shirt; the away and third shirts however had Kingston Communications as the sponsor on the front.

Hull's Home kit for 2008–09.	Hull's Away Kit for 2008–09	Hull's Third Kit for 2008–09	Hull's Goalkeeper Kit for 2008–09

== FA Cup ==
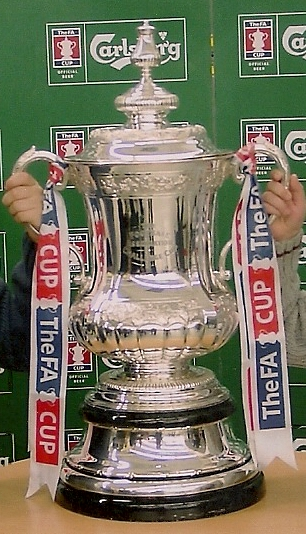
The FA Cup Trophy

=== Summary ===
Hull entered the FA Cup at the third round stage and were handed a home tie against Newcastle United. The match took place on 3 January 2009 at the KC Stadium and although both sides had chances, neither were able to break the dead-lock. A replay at St James' Park took place on 14 January 2009. Newcastle had the better of the first-half. After 21 minutes, Nicky Butt headed a free kick onto the crossbar and later, after a clash of Hull defenders, Michael Owen shot high with only Matt Duke to beat. After half-time, Owen had a low shot low turned round the post by Duke, while Charles N'Zogbia had a shot blocked by Zayatte. Cousin broke the dead-lock on 81 minutes by turning in a Garcia cross. Newcastle had opportunities to equalise but failed to find the target.

Hull's 0–1 win at Newcastle put them in the draw for the fourth round and they were given another home match this time against Football League One team Millwall. The match took place on 24 January 2009 at the KC Stadium. Hull fielded a changed team which saw goalkeeper Tony Warner getting a debut. Turner put Hull in the lead with a header following a Dawson free kick. Millwall failed to make the most of their opportunities and Hull sealed the match with a late strike by Ashbee.

Hull entered the fifth round for the first time since 1989 and were given an away tie with local team Sheffield United. The local derby match took place on 14 February 2009 at Bramall Lane. Sheffield were quickly on the score sheet with a header by Greg Halford from a cross by David Cotterill. Hull responded before half time when Kamil Zayatte headed in an Andy Dawson centre. There were opportunities for both sides in the second half but no one was able to break the 1–1 dead-lock.

The fifth round replay took place on 26 February at the KC stadium. Hull took the lead when a header from United defender Kyle Naughton bounced off his own crossbar and crossed the line for an own-goal. United levelled soon after with a Billy Sharp shot. City sealed the match early in the second half when Péter Halmosi shot in from a Nick Barmby cross. Hull's 2–1 win gave them a place in the last eight for the first time in 38 years.

A quarter-final game against Arsenal at the Emirates Stadium on 17 March 2009 was the prize for getting to this stage in the competition. Hull started the best and after 13 minutes took the lead when a Nick Barmby shot from an Andy Dawson cross was deflected into the Arsenal net. A Geovanni free kick was pushed over by Cesc Fàbregas followed by a Nick Barmby goal being disallowed for offside. Kamil Zayatte also came close with a header before Arsenal started to reply before the break with an Andrey Arshavin shot blocked by Sam Ricketts. Following the break Arsenal continued to apply pressure with Abou Diaby heading wide and then Andrei Arshavin being blocked by Sam Ricketts. A Robin van Persie header was blocked on the line by Andy Dawson and Alex Song shot the rebound wide. Following sustained pressure, Hull were pegged back by Robin van Persie after 74 minutes. Hull almost regained the lead from a Geovanni shot which went wide, but Samir Nasri lofted a free-kick into the area which keeper Boaz Myhill failed to hold and William Gallas headed home the winner from what looked like an offside position. Hull could not respond and lost the match 1–2 on the night with Arsenal going on to play Chelsea in the semi-final.

=== Results ===
Date	Opponents	H / A	Result	Scorers	Attendance	Notes
3 January	Newcastle United	H	0–0		20,557
14 January	Newcastle United	A	0–1	Cousin (81)	31,380
24 January	Millwall	H	2–0	Turner (15), Ashbee (84)	18,639
14 February	Sheffield United	A	1–1	Halford (7), Zayatte (34)	22,283
26 February	Sheffield United	H	2–1	Naughton (24) o.g., Sharp (32), Halmosi (56)	17,239
17 March	Arsenal	A	1–2	Barmby (13), Van Persie (74), Gallas (84)	55,641

=== Records ===
Top Goalscorer

Assists

Appearances

Attendance
Average:
Highest:
Lowest:

== League Cup ==
=== Summary ===
On Wednesday 13 August the draw for the League Cup second round was made. Hull were seeded so they couldn't get another Premier League side. Hull City were drawn away to Swansea. The game took place on 27 August. Hull scored first with a Dean Windass goal in the 11th minute. Gorka Pintado equalised for Swansea in the 63rd minute, then he missed a penalty in extra time. The game went to added time. Swansea scored a penalty 14 minutes into added time, taking Hull out of the League Cup in the first round.

=== Results ===
Date	Opponents	H / A	Result	Scorers	Attendance	Notes
27 August	Swansea City	A	2–1 (aet)	Windass (11) Pintado (63) Gomez 105 (pen)	8,622

=== Records ===
Top Goalscorer

Assists

Appearances

Attendance
Average:
Highest:
Lowest:

== See also ==
- Hull City A.F.C. seasons
