= 2007–08 Hull City A.F.C. season =

English football club season

Hull City
2007–08 season
- Chairman: Paul Duffen
- Manager: Phil Brown
- Stadium: KC Stadium
- Championship: 3rd (qualified for play-offs)
- Play-offs: Winners
- FA Cup: Third round
- League Cup: Third round
- Top goalscorer: League: Fraizer Campbell (15); All: Fraizer Campbell (15)
- Highest home attendance: 24,350 (vs. Crystal Palace, 26 April 2008)
- Lowest home attendance: 14,822 (vs. Coventry City, 29 January 2008)
- Average home league attendance: 18,024
Home colours	Away colours

During the 2007–08 English football season, Hull City A.F.C. competed in the Football League Championship.

== Season summary ==
Hull finished a mere four points adrift of second-placed Stoke City for promotion to the Premier League, qualifying for the play-offs instead. After trouncing Watford 6–1 over two legs, Hull City reached Wembley to play a Bristol City side aiming for a second successive promotion. A single Dean Windass goal gave Hull the game and promotion to English football's top flight for the first time in Hull's history. Promotion was made all the more incredible considering that five seasons ago Hull were languishing in the bottom tier of the Football League, and that when manager Phil Brown had taken the managerial role at Hull in December 2006 the club were in the Championship relegation zone.

== Players ==
=== First-team squad ===
Note: Flags indicate national team as defined under FIFA eligibility rules; some limited exceptions apply. Players may hold more than one non-FIFA nationality.

No.	Pos.	Nation	Player
1	GK	WAL	Boaz Myhill (Note: Myhill was born in Modesto, California, United States, but was raised in England from the age of 1 and qualified to represent any of the home nations internationally, and represented England at U-17, U-18, and U-20 level before making his international debut for Wales in March 2008.)
2	MF	ENG	Nathan Doyle
3	DF	ENG	Andy Dawson
4	MF	ENG	Ian Ashbee
5	MF	ENG	Simon Walton (on loan from Queens Park Rangers)
6	DF	ENG	Michael Turner
7	MF	NIR	Stuart Elliott
8	MF	ENG	Nick Barmby
9	FW	ENG	Dean Windass
11	MF	ENG	Bryan Hughes
12	GK	ENG	Matt Duke
13	MF	ENG	Ryan France
14	MF	AUS	Richard Garcia
15	DF	ENG	Wayne Brown
17	FW	ENG	Michael Bridges
18	FW	IRL	Caleb Folan (Note: Folan was born in Leeds, England, but also qualified to represent the Republic of Ireland internationally through his grandparents and was called up by the Republic of Ireland in 2007 without playing before making his debut for the Republic of Ireland in October 2008.)
19	MF	ENG	John Welsh

No.	Pos.	Nation	Player
20	FW	DEN	Henrik Pedersen
21	DF	WAL	Sam Ricketts (Note: Ricketts was born in Aylesbury, England, and represented England at C level, but also qualified to represent Wales internationally through his grandmother and made his debut for Wales in February 2005.)
22	MF	ENG	Dean Marney
23	FW	ENG	Craig Fagan (on loan from Derby County)
24	MF	ENG	David Livermore
25	FW	ENG	Fraizer Campbell (on loan from Manchester United)
26	GK	ENG	Tom Woodhead
27	FW	ENG	Nicky Featherstone
29	DF	ENG	Matty Plummer
31	MF	ENG	Will Atkinson
32	MF	ENG	James Bennett
33	DF	ENG	Brewster Frizzell
34	DF	ENG	Frank Belt
35	GK	ENG	Mark Tyler (on loan from Peterborough United)
37	DF	SCO	Liam Cooper (Note: Cooper was born in Kingston upon Hull, England, but also qualified to represent Scotland internationally through his paternal grandfather and represented Scotland at U-17 and U-19 level before making his international debut for Scotland in September 2019.)
44	MF	NGR	Jay-Jay Okocha

=== Left club during season ===
Note: Flags indicate national team as defined under FIFA eligibility rules; some limited exceptions apply. Players may hold more than one non-FIFA nationality.

No.	Pos.	Nation	Player
5	DF	ENG	Danny Coles (to Bristol Rovers)
10	FW	SCO	Stephen McPhee (to Blackpool)
10	DF	ENG	Neil Clement (on loan from West Bromwich Albion)
16	DF	IRL	Damien Delaney (to Queens Park Rangers)

No.	Pos.	Nation	Player
23	DF	ENG	Sam Collins (to Hartlepool United)
28	GK	ENG	Curtis Aspden (to Farsley Celtic)
30	MF	ENG	Ben Wilkinson (on loan to Gretna)

== Transfers ==
=== In ===
Date	Nation	Position	Player	Club From	Fee
19 June 2007	(England)	FW	Dean Windass	Bradford City	£150,000
29 June 2007	(England)	MF	Bryan Hughes	Charlton Athletic	Free
2 July 2007	(Australia)	DF	Richard Garcia	Colchester United	Free
14 July 2007	(England)	MF	Wayne Brown	Colchester United	£450,000
13 August 2007	(Denmark)	FW	Henrik Pedersen	Bolton Wanderers	Free
31 August 2007	(Republic of Ireland)	FW	Caleb Folan	Wigan Athletic	£1,000,000

=== Out ===
Date	Nation	Position	Player	Club To	Fee
24 May 2007	(England)	DF	Scott Wiseman	Darlington	Free
1 June 2007	(England)	MF	Ray Parlour	Free Agency	Released
20 June 2007	(England)	FW	Jon Parkin	Stoke City	£250,000, rising to £500,000
25 June 2007	(England)	FW	Nicky Forster	Brighton and Hove Albion	£75,000
10 July 2007	(Scotland)	FW	Darryl Duffy	Swansea City	£200,000
7 January 2008	(Scotland)	FW	Stephen McPhee	Blackpool	Undisclosed
8 January 2008	(England)	DF	Danny Coles	Bristol Rovers	Undisclosed
17 January 2008	(Republic of Ireland)	DF	Damien Delaney	Queens Park Rangers	Undisclosed
31 January 2008	(England)	DF	Sam Collins	Hartlepool United	Nominal

=== Loan In ===
Date	Nation	Position	Player	Club From	Length
18 October 2007	(England)	FW	Fraizer Campbell	Manchester United	Three months(extended 4 January)
29 January 2008	(England)	MF	Simon Walton	Queens Park Rangers	Until end of season
20 February 2008	(England)	DF	Neil Clement	West Bromwich Albion	Until end of season(recalled 27 March)
8 March 2008	(England)	FW	Craig Fagan	Derby County	Until end of season

=== Loan Out ===
Date	Nation	Position	Player	Club To	Length
28 September 2007	(England)	DF	Sam Collins	Swindon Town	One Month
1 October 2007	(England)	DF	Danny Coles	Hartlepool United	One Month
1 November 2007	(England)	DF	Danny Coles	Bristol Rovers	Three Months

== Statistics ==
=== Starting 11 ===
Considering starts in all competitions

- GK: (Wales) Boaz Myhill, 46
- RB: (Wales) Sam Ricketts, 45
- CB: (England) Michael Turner, 48
- CB: (England) Wayne Brown, 44
- LB: (England) Andy Dawson, 25
- RM: (Australia) Richard Garcia, 36
- CM: (England) Ian Ashbee, 43
- CM: (England) Dean Marney, 36
- LM: (England) Bryan Hughes, 27
- CF: (England) Fraizer Campbell, 32
- CF: (England) Dean Windass, 29

== Football League Championship ==
=== Results by round ===
Round	1	2	3	4	5	6	7	8	9	10	11	12	13	14	15	16	17	18	19	20	21	22	23	24	25	26	27	28	29	30	31	32	33	34	35	36	37	38	39	40	41	42	43	44	45	46
Ground	H	A	H	A	H	A	A	H	H	A	A	H	H	A	A	H	A	H	H	A	A	H	A	H	H	A	H	H	A	H	A	H	A	A	H	H	A	H	A	A	H	H	A	A	H	A
Result	L	D	W	L	D	W	D	W	L	D	L	W	D	L	W	W	W	D	D	L	L	W	D	W	W	D	L	W	W	D	D	D	W	L	W	W	L	W	W	W	W	D	W	L	W	L
Position	17	16	13	18	20	12	18	11	14	15	18	13	14	16	13	11	9	9	10	12	14	13	11	11	8	9	10	11	8	8	10	9	8	10	9	6	6	5	5	4	4	4	2	3	3	3

Source: worldfootball.net
A = Away; H = Home; W = Win; D = Draw; L = Loss

=== Matches ===
Win Draw Loss Postponed

11 August 2007 1	Hull City	2–3	Plymouth Argyle	Hull
	Windass 3'; Marney 49'; Barmby (yellow card); Delaney (yellow card); Windass (yellow card)	Report	Norris 15'; Fallon 45'; Ebanks-Blake 81'; Halmosi (yellow card)	Stadium: KC Stadium; Attendance: 16,633; Referee: G Laws

18 August 2007 2	Coventry City	1–1	Hull City	Coventry
	McKenzie 51'	Report	Barmby 62'; Ricketts (yellow card); Marney (yellow card); Ricketts (red card) 68'	Stadium: Ricoh Arena; Attendance: 21,059; Referee: Barry Knight

25 August 2007 3	Hull City	2–1	Norwich City	Hull
	Windass 49'; Garcia 77'; Dawson (yellow card); Marney (yellow card)	Report	Dublin 71'	Stadium: KC Stadium; Attendance: 15,939; Referee: Nigel Miller

3 September 2007 4	Blackpool	2–1	Hull City	Blackpool
	Taylor-Fletcher 47'; Burgess 90'; Jackson (yellow card); Gorkšs (yellow card); Burgess (yellow card)	Report	Ashbee 50'; Garcia (yellow card)	Stadium: Bloomfield Road; Attendance: 7,902; Referee: Kevin Friend

15 September 2007 5	Hull City	1–1	Stoke City	Hull
	Livermore 87'; Folan (yellow card)	Report	Delap 44'	Stadium: KC Stadium; Attendance: 19,642; Referee: Colin Webster

18 September 2007 6	Wolverhampton Wanderers	0–1	Hull City	Wolverhampton
	Hennessey (yellow card)	Report	Windass 49' (pen.); Windass (yellow card)	Stadium: Molineux Stadium; Attendance: 21,352; Referee: Michael Jones

22 September 2007 7	Sheffield Wednesday	1–0	Hull City	Sheffield
	Jeffers 40'; Burton (yellow card); Spurr (yellow card); Kavanagh (yellow card); Tudgay (yellow card)	Report	Marney (yellow card); Ricketts (yellow card)	Stadium: Hillsborough Stadium; Attendance: 21,518; Referee: Phil Dowd

29 September 2007 8	Hull City	3–1	Ipswich Town	Hull
	Pedersen 11', 40'; Brown 45'	Report	Harding 45'	Stadium: KC Stadium; Attendance: 15,456; Referee: Lee Probert

2 October 2007 9	Hull City	1–2	Charlton Athletic	Hull
	McPhee 90'; Marney (yellow card); Windass (yellow card); Ashbee (red card) 44'	Report	Varney 41'; Iwelumo 89'; Bougherra (yellow card); Sam (red card) 44'	Stadium: KC Stadium; Attendance: 15,001; Referee: Anthony Taylor

6 October 2007 10	Crystal Palace	1–1	Hull City	Selhurst
	Scowcroft 81'	Report	Marney 90' (pen.); Livermore (yellow card)	Stadium: Selhurst Park; Attendance: 15,769; Referee: Richard Beeby

20 October 2007 11	Watford	1–0	Hull City	Watford
	King 20'	Report	Livermore (yellow card); Brown (yellow card); Marney (yellow card)	Stadium: Vicarage Road; Attendance: 15,803; Referee: Andy Woolmer

22 October 2007 12	Hull City	3–0	Barnsley	Hull
	Campbell 7', 18'; Marney 90'	Report	Souza (yellow card); De Silva (yellow card)	Stadium: KC Stadium; Attendance: 15,761; Referee: Andy D'Urso

27 October 2007 13	Hull City	1–1	Sheffield United	Hull
	Windass 54' (pen.); Livermore (yellow card)	Report	Stead 35'; Tonge (yellow card); Stead (yellow card); Cahill (yellow card)	Stadium: KC Stadium; Attendance: 20,185; Referee: Lee Mason

3 November 2007 14	Queens Park Rangers	2–0	Hull City	Shepherd's Bush
	Ephraim 26'; Leigertwood 56'; Mancienne (yellow card); Barker (yellow card); Stewart (yellow card); Vine (yellow card)	Report	Turner (yellow card); Delaney (yellow card)	Stadium: Loftus Road; Attendance: 12,375; Referee: Steve Tanner

6 November 2007 15	Burnley	0–1	Hull City	Burnley
		Report	Turner 90'; Ashbee (yellow card)	Stadium: Turf Moor; Attendance: 9,978; Referee: Chris Foy

10 November 2007 16	Hull City	3–0	Preston North End	Hull
	Windass 11'; Campbell 21'; Dawson 63'; Brown (yellow card)	Report	Davidson (yellow card)	Stadium: KC Stadium; Attendance: 16,358; Referee: Scott Mathieson

24 November 2007 17	Scunthorpe United	1–2	Hull City	Scunthorpe
	Forte 45'; Youga (yellow card)	Report	Windass 4', 16'; Turner (yellow card); Ashbee (yellow card); Ricketts (yellow card)	Stadium: Glanford Park; Attendance: 8,633; Referee: Uriah Rennie

27 November 2007 18	Hull City	0–0	Bristol City	Hull
		Report	McAllister (yellow card); McAllister (red card) 45'	Stadium: KC Stadium; Attendance: 15,768; Referee: Andy Penn

1 December 2007 19	Hull City	2–2	Cardiff City	Hull
	McPhee 4'; Garcia 43'; Ricketts (yellow card); Delaney (yellow card); Folan (yellow card)	Report	Thompson 6'; Johnson 90'; Purse (yellow card)	Stadium: KC Stadium; Attendance: 16,269; Referee: Mike Dean

4 December 2007 20	Preston North End	3–0	Hull City	Preston
	Agyemang 60'; Whaley 68'; Neal 89'	Report	Turner (yellow card)	Stadium: Deepdale; Attendance: 11,311; Referee: Steve Bratt

8 December 2007 21	Southampton	4–0	Hull City	Southampton
	Wright-Phillips 43'; John 58', 76', 78'; John (yellow card)	Report	Ricketts (yellow card); Delaney (yellow card)	Stadium: St Mary's Stadium; Attendance: 18,125; Referee: Mike Thorpe

15 December 2007 22	Hull City	2–0	Leicester City	Hull
	Folan 17'; Campbell 78'; Windass (yellow card)	Report	Sheehan (yellow card); Mattock (yellow card)	Stadium: KC Stadium; Attendance: 16,006; Referee: Graham Salisbury

22 December 2007 23	Charlton Athletic	1–1	Hull City	Charlton
	Bougherra 57'; Mills (yellow card); Mills (red card) 72'	Report	Campbell 37'; Hughes (yellow card); Folan (yellow card); Garcia (yellow card); Campbell (yellow card)	Stadium: The Valley; Attendance: 22,040; Referee: Tony Bates

26 December 2007 24	Hull City	2–0	Wolverhampton Wanderers	Hull
	Garcia 47'; Campbell 61'	Report	Collins (yellow card)	Stadium: KC Stadium; Attendance: 19,127; Referee: Chris Foy

30 December 2007 25	Hull City	1–0	Sheffield Wednesday	Hull
	Windass 33'; Dawson (yellow card); Livermore (yellow card)	Report	O'Brien (yellow card)	Stadium: KC Stadium; Attendance: 21,252; Referee: Michael Jones

1 January 2008 26	Stoke City	1–1	Hull City	Stoke-on-Trent
	Cort 33'	Report	Folan 61'; Turner (yellow card)	Stadium: Britannia Stadium; Attendance: 15,788; Referee: Neil Swarbrick

12 January 2008 27	Hull City	1–3	West Bromwich Albion	Hull
	Garcia 71'; Windass (yellow card); Delaney (yellow card)	Report	Phillips 2'; Morrison 32'; Bednar 90'; Robinson (yellow card); Robinson (red card) 74'	Stadium: KC Stadium; Attendance: 18,391; Referee: Colin Webster

29 January 2008 28	Hull City	1–0	Coventry City	Hull
	Folan 90'; Marney (yellow card)	Report	Osbourne (yellow card); Davis (yellow card)	Stadium: KC Stadium; Attendance: 14,822; Referee: Clive Oliver

2 February 2008 29	Plymouth Argyle	0–1	Hull City	Plymouth
	Timár (yellow card)	Report	Windass 45'; Walton (yellow card)	Stadium: Home Park; Attendance: 11,011; Referee: Paul Armstrong

9 February 2008 30	Hull City	2–2	Blackpool	Hull
	Folan 60'; Windass 71'; Barmby (yellow card)	Report	Dickov 38', 50'; Burgess (yellow card); Gorkšs (yellow card); Taylor-Fletcher (yellow card); Jørgensen (yellow card)	Stadium: KC Stadium; Attendance: 18,407; Referee: Jon Moss

13 February 2008 31	Norwich City	1–1	Hull City	Norwich
	Dublin 19'	Report	Campbell 53'; Myhill (yellow card)	Stadium: Carrow Road; Attendance: 25,259; Referee: Andy Hall

16 February 2008 32	Hull City	1–1	Colchester United	Hull
	Campbell 64'; Walton (yellow card); Marney (yellow card)	Report	Jackson 47'; McLeod (yellow card)	Stadium: KC Stadium; Attendance: 15,664; Referee: Peter Walton

23 February 2008 33	West Bromwich Albion	1–2	Hull City	West Bromwich
	Bednář 42'; Morrison (yellow card); Miller (yellow card)	Report	Campbell 29'; Folan 82'; Folan (yellow card); Garcia (yellow card); Turner (yellow card); Dawson (yellow card)	Stadium: The Hawthorns; Attendance: 22,716; Referee: Steve Tanner

1 March 2008 34	Bristol City	2–1	Hull City	Bristol
	Adebola 14'; McCombe 46'; McAllister (yellow card)	Report	Fontaine 45' (o.g.); Ricketts (yellow card); Ashbee (yellow card)	Stadium: Ashton Gate Stadium; Attendance: 15,859; Referee: Clive Penton

4 March 2008 35	Hull City	2–0	Burnley	Hull
	Campbell 14'; Garcia 28'; Garcia (yellow card); Ashbee (yellow card); Folan (red card) 70'; Okocha (red card) 76'	Report	Carlisle (yellow card); Guðjónsson (yellow card); Caldwell (yellow card); Caldwell (red card) 71'; Guðjónsson (red card) 77'	Stadium: KC Stadium; Attendance: 15,838; Referee: Mike Riley

8 March 2008 36	Hull City	2–0	Scunthorpe United	Hull
	Pedersen 27'; Turner 37'	Report		Stadium: KC Stadium; Attendance: 20,906; Referee: Mark Halsey

10 March 2008 37	Cardiff City	1–0	Hull City	Cardiff
	McPhail 2'; Capaldi (yellow card); Loovens (yellow card); Scimeca (yellow card)	Report	Turner (yellow card)	Stadium: Ninian Park; Attendance: 17,555; Referee: Lee Probert

15 March 2008 38	Hull City	5–0	Southampton	Hull
	Campbell 7'; Pedersen 55'; Turner 57'; Marney 68'; Hughes 90'	Report	Viáfara (yellow card)	Stadium: KC Stadium; Attendance: 16,829; Referee: Eddie Ilderton

18 March 2008 39	Colchester United	1–3	Hull City	Colchester
	Lisbie 37'; Virgo (yellow card); Heath (yellow card); Izzet (yellow card); Lisbie (yellow card); Ifil (red card) 14'	Report	Campbell 20', 33'; Folan 87'; Campbell (yellow card); Ricketts (yellow card)	Stadium: Layer Road; Attendance: 5,497; Referee: Pat Miller

22 March 2008 40	Leicester City	0–2	Hull City	Leicester
	Kisnorbo (yellow card); Henderson (yellow card); Hendrie (yellow card); Stearman (yellow card)	Report	Marney 45'; Folan 76'; Garcia (yellow card); Myhill (yellow card)	Stadium: Walkers Stadium; Attendance: 30,374; Referee: Richard Beeby

29 March 2008 41	Hull City	3–0	Watford	Hull
	Turner 1'; Campbell 13'; Folan 73'; Campbell (yellow card); Brown (yellow card); Myhill (yellow card)	Report	Sadler (yellow card); Kabba (red card) 75'	Stadium: KC Stadium; Attendance: 23,501; Referee: Uriah Rennie

12 April 2008 42	Hull City	1–1	Queens Park Rangers	Hull
	Turner 90'; Fagan (yellow card)	Report	Blackstock 14'; Rowlands (yellow card); Camp (yellow card); Leigertwood (yellow card)	Stadium: KC Stadium; Attendance: 22,468; Referee: Graham Laws

15 April 2008 43	Barnsley	1–3	Hull City	Barnsley
	Ferenczi 90'	Report	Marney 24' (pen.); Ashbee 52'; Windass 83'	Stadium: Oakwell; Attendance: 13,061; Referee: Stuart Attwell

19 April 2008 44	Sheffield United	2–0	Hull City	Sheffield
	Quinn 51'; Beattie 72' (pen.); Morgan (yellow card); Morgan (red card) 45'	Report	Livermore (yellow card); Fagan (yellow card); Windass (yellow card)	Stadium: Bramall Lane; Attendance: 28,188; Referee: Phil Dowd

26 April 2008 45	Hull City	2–1	Crystal Palace	Hull
	Campbell 18'; Ashbee 85'	Report	Sinclair 38'; Derry (yellow card)	Stadium: KC Stadium; Attendance: 24,350; Referee: R Booth

4 May 2008 46	Ipswich Town	1–0	Hull City	Ipswich
	Lee 70'; Couñago (yellow card); Haynes (yellow card)	Report	Marney (yellow card); Brown (yellow card); Ricketts (yellow card); Dawson (yellow card)	Stadium: Portman Road; Attendance: 28,233; Referee: Andre Marriner

=== Playoffs ===
11 May 2008 1st leg	Watford	0–2	Hull City	Watford
12:30 BST	Priskin (yellow card); Eustace (red card) 61'	Report	Barmby 8'; Windass 27'; Campbell (yellow card)	Stadium: Vicarage Road; Attendance: 14,173; Referee: Kevin Friend

14 May 2008 2nd leg	Hull City	4–1 (6–1 agg.)	Watford	Hull
19:45 BST	Barmby 43'; Folan 70'; Garcia 88'; Doyle 90'; Barmby (yellow card); Turner (yellow card)	Report	Henderson 12'	Stadium: KC Stadium; Attendance: 23,155; Referee: Mark Clattenburg

=== Final ===
24 May 2008	Bristol City	0–1	Hull City	London
15:00 BST	Sproule (yellow card) 77'	Report	Windass 38'; Campbell (yellow card) 90+3'	Stadium: Wembley Stadium; Attendance: 86,703; Referee: Alan Wiley

=== League table ===
Pos	Team	Pld	W	D	L	GF	GA	GD	Pts	Promotion, qualification or relegation
1	West Bromwich Albion (C, P)	46	23	12	11	88	55	+33	81	Promotion to the Premier League
2	Stoke City (P)	46	21	16	9	69	55	+14	79	Promotion to the Premier League
3	Hull City (O, P)	46	21	12	13	65	47	+18	75	Qualification for Championship play-offs
4	Bristol City	46	20	14	12	54	53	+1	74	Qualification for Championship play-offs
5	Crystal Palace	46	18	17	11	58	42	+16	71	Qualification for Championship play-offs

Updated to match(es) played on 4 May 2008. Source: The Football League
Rules for classification: 1) points; 2) goal difference; 3) number of goals scored.
(C) Champions; (O) Play-off winners; (P) Promoted

== FA Cup ==
5 January 2008 3	Plymouth Argyle	3–2	Hull City	Plymouth
	Abdou 23'; Halmosi 26'; Ebanks-Blake 58'; Easter (yellow card)	Report	Windass 51', 60'; Marney (yellow card)	Stadium: Home Park; Attendance: 12,419; Referee: Paul Taylor

== League Cup ==
15 August 2007 1	Crewe Alexandra	0–3	Hull City	Crewe
	Roberts (yellow card)	Report	Bridges 44'; Garcia 55'; McPhee 70'; Doyle (yellow card)	Stadium: Alexandra Stadium; Attendance: 2,862; Referee: P. Miller

28 August 2007 2	Wigan Athletic	0–1	Hull City	Wigan
	Cotterill (yellow card)	Report	Elliott 31'; Livermore (yellow card); Elliott (yellow card)	Stadium: DW Stadium; Attendance: 5,440; Referee: Eddie Ilderton

26 September 2007 3rd round	Hull City	0–4	Chelsea	Hull
	Brown (yellow card)	Report	Sinclair 37'; Kalou 46', 81'; Sidwell 52'	Stadium: KC Stadium; Attendance: 23,543; Referee: Chris Foy
