= Michael Turner (footballer, born 1983) =

English footballer

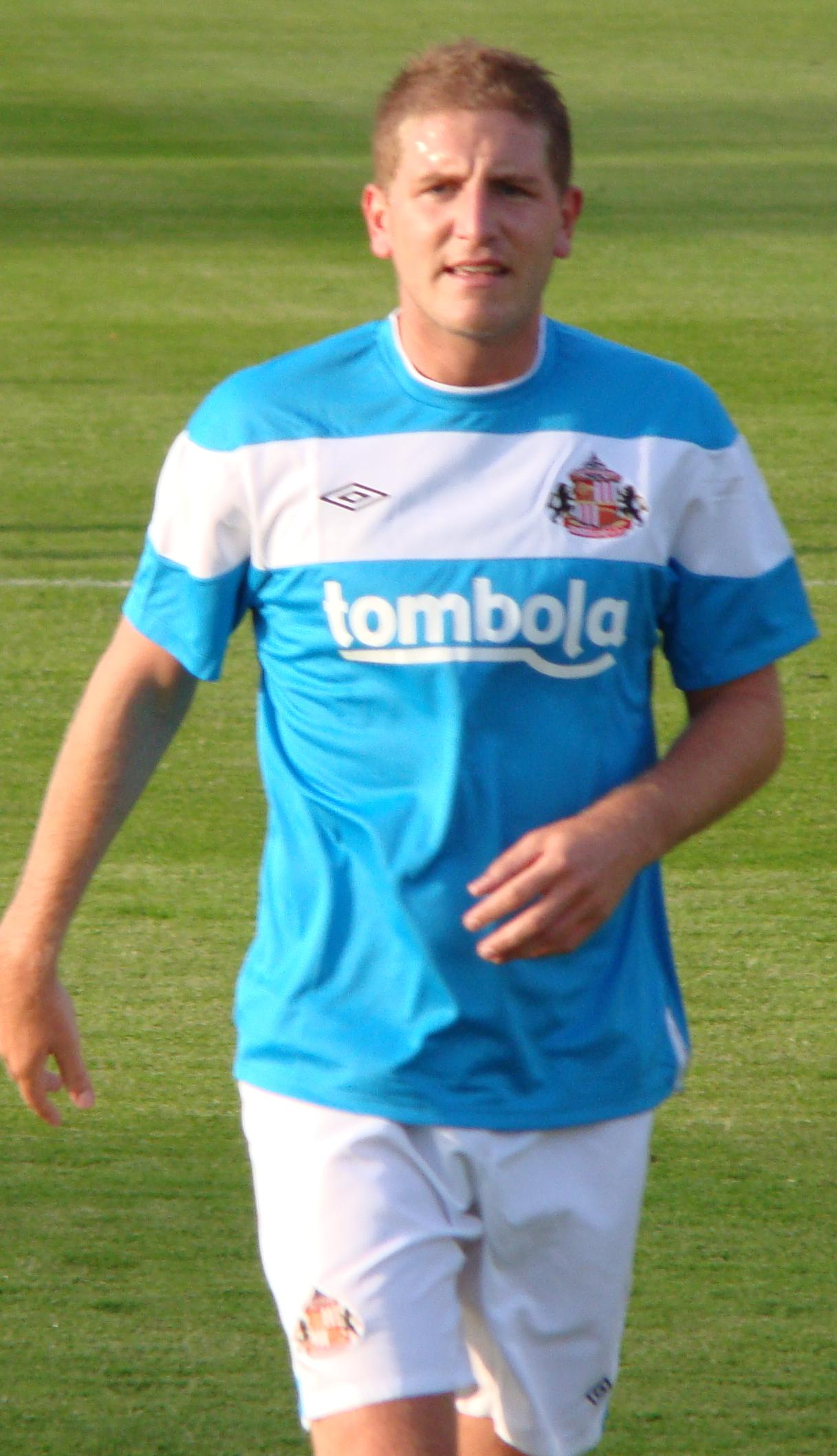
- Turner playing for Sunderland in 2011

Personal information
- Full name: Michael Thomas Turner
- Date of birth: 9 November 1983 (age 43)
- Place of birth: Lewisham, England
- Height: 6 ft 4 in (1.93 m)
- Position: Defender

Youth career
- –2002: Charlton Athletic
- 1998: → Internazionale (apprenticeship)

Senior career*
Years	Team	Apps	(Gls)
2002–2004	Charlton Athletic	0	(0)
2003	→ Leyton Orient (loan)	7	(1)
2004	→ Brentford (loan)	16	(0)
2004–2006	Brentford	75	(3)
2006–2009	Hull City	129	(12)
2009–2012	Sunderland	68	(1)
2012–2017	Norwich City	71	(4)
2015	→ Fulham (loan)	9	(1)
2015–2016	→ Sheffield Wednesday (loan)	9	(1)
2017–2019	Southend United	61	(5)
Total		445	(28)
- * Club domestic league appearances and goals as of 11:38, 5 May 2019 (UTC)

Michael Thomas Turner (born 9 November 1983) is an English former professional footballer who played as a defender.

== Club career ==
=== Charlton Athletic ===
Born in Lewisham, London, Turner started his career at Charlton Athletic. As part of a link-up Charlton had with Internazionale, he spent several months of his apprenticeship with the Italian club's under-19 team. After signing professional terms with Charlton, he went out on loan to Leyton Orient in March 2003 until the end of the 2002–03 season. The following season, he was captain of Charlton's reserve team, and was named Charlton's Young Player of the Year 2003–04.

=== Brentford ===
In August 2004, Turner joined Brentford on an initial one-month loan, which was later extended to two, then three, months. At the end of his loan spell, in November 2004, Brentford signed Turner permanently, on a two-and-a-half-year contract, for an undisclosed fee. He was highly rated at Griffin Park, being voted Players' Player of the Year in the 2004–05 season and Supporters' Player of the Year in the 2005–06 season.

=== Hull City ===
In July 2006, Turner joined Hull City, for a fee of £350,000, on a three-year contract. Turner was Phil Parkinson's first signing for the Tigers, during his short spell in charge. Parkinson said of the signing: "He's a player that I've watched for a number of years, firstly with Charlton reserves and then obviously with Brentford. I like him a lot and believe he'll be an excellent signing for us because he's ready to play Championship football. Michael was the best central defender in League One last season and is ready to step up."

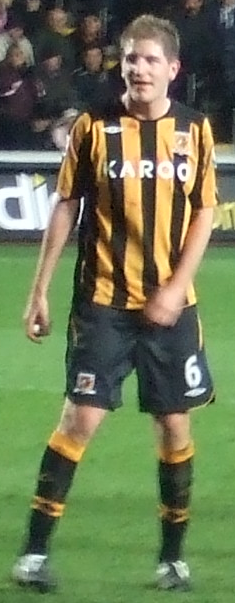
Turner playing for Hull City in 2009

After a very disappointing start to the 2006–07 season, Turner's form significantly improved, and he finished the season as one of the club's successes of the year. He was voted Hull City's Player of the Year in their promotion-winning 2007–08 season. His good form was rewarded, as he signed a new three-year deal with Hull in April 2008.

Turner scored his first Premier League goal in September 2008 during a 2–2 draw at home to Everton. Turner scored his second goal of the 2008–09 season against West Ham United in October, which proved to be the winning goal of the match with the game ending 1–0 to Hull City at the KC Stadium.

Turner played every minute of every Premier League game for Hull in 2008–09, and was one of only two outfield players to do so, the other being Portsmouth's Sylvain Distin. At the end of the season Turner was named as the Official Supporters Club's player of the year for the third season in a row, as well as the club's official player of the year for the second season in a row.

On 31 August 2009, after Turner had been repeatedly linked with Liverpool and Manchester City, amongst other clubs, a bid was finally accepted from Sunderland after Hull City manager Phil Brown claimed that offers currently tabled for Turner were "getting towards a ridiculous valuation".

=== Sunderland ===
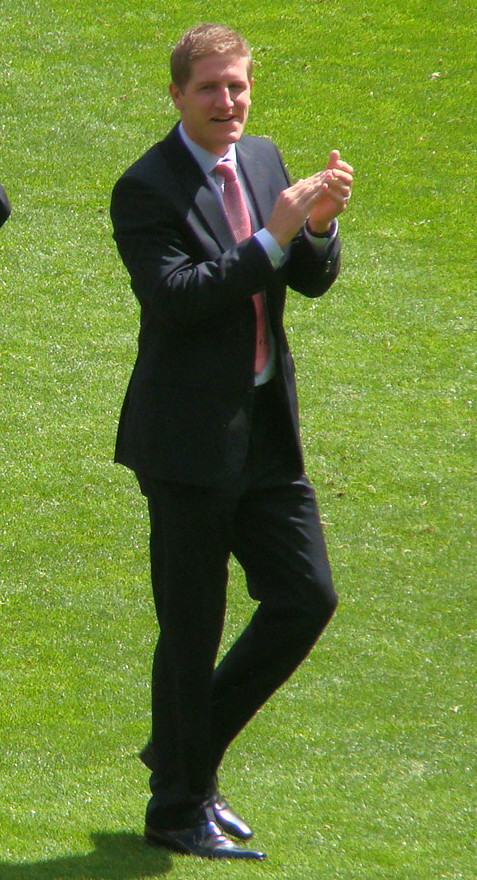
Turner with Sunderland in 2011

Sunderland completed the signing of Turner on a four-year contract for an undisclosed fee initially thought to be at least £6 million, but later revealed to be just £4 million, with Charlton receiving part of the transfer fee as a sell-on-clause. Turner made his Sunderland debut against former club Hull City. Turner thought he had scored on his debut against his former club, but the goal, Sunderland's fourth, was later credited as a Kamil Zayatte own goal. Turner scored his first Sunderland goal and completed the full 90 minutes against Wolverhampton Wanderers in the Premier League on 27 September 2009 in a 5–2 victory. On 19 December 2009 Turner was sent off during Sunderland's 4–3 defeat at Manchester City. Sunderland appealed the decision, but it was rejected, and Turner controversially had his suspension increased to four matches. Turner played his first game of the 2010–11 season against Colchester United in the League Cup 2nd round tie at the Stadium of Light. On 29 August 2010, he started his first Premier League match of the season against Manchester City but had to be replaced through injury at half-time by Phil Bardsley in a 1–0 win at the Stadium of Light. He did not make his return to the first team until 25 September 2010 against Liverpool at Anfield, when he completed the full 90 minutes alongside Titus Bramble in the 2–2 draw. On 2 October, Turner played the full 90 minutes against Manchester United in a 0–0 draw at the Stadium of Light. On 18 October 2010, he started and played the full 90 minutes against Blackburn Rovers at Ewood Park in a 0–0 draw. In November, Turner sustained a knee injury making a goal-line clearance in Sunderland's 2–2 draw with Everton. The injury ruled Turner out for several months, and although he returned to action in March, his form dropped and he continued to struggle for fitness.

After returning to full fitness, Turner started his first game of the 2011–12 season on 1 October 2011, a 2–2 draw with West Bromwich. He retained his place in the next three games, a defeat at Arsenal, an away win at Bolton and a home draw with Aston Villa, before suffering a re-occurrence of his injury. He returned to action on 14 January 2012 away to Chelsea, replacing Matthew Kilgallon who had himself suffered an injury, as Sunderland lost 1–0. He started for the Black Cats in their back to back wins against Norwich and Stoke, helping keep clean sheets in the process. Turner also started in Sunderland's FA Cup fourth round replay at Middlesbrough, and was widely blamed for Lukas Jutkiewicz's equaliser, although Sunderland went on to win in extra time.

=== Norwich City ===
On 27 July 2012, Norwich City manager Chris Hughton revealed that the club had signed Sunderland's Michael Turner on a 2-year deal for an undisclosed fee. He scored his first goal for the club on 27 October with a late header to earn Norwich a point in a 1–1 draw away to Aston Villa. In April 2013, he scored in back-to-back games, in a 2–2 draw against Swansea City and a 1–3 loss against Arsenal.

In May 2017, it was announced that Turner would be released when his contract expired.

==== Fulham (loan) ====
On 12 March 2015, Turner joined Fulham on loan and scored on 25 April 2015 against Middlesbrough at Craven Cottage.

==== Sheffield Wednesday (loan) ====
On 27 August 2015, Turner joined Championship side Sheffield Wednesday on a season-long loan. He made his debut on 19 September 2015 in a 3–2 home win over former side Fulham in which he scored the 3rd goal. On 14 December, he expressed his desire for a permanent move to Wednesday as he had no longer featured in his parent club Norwich City since February.

=== Southend United ===
On 11 July 2017, Turner joined League One team Southend United. He made 65 appearances and scored five goals before his release at the end of the 2018–19 season.

== International career ==
A string of good performances in October 2008 led teammate Dean Marney to call for Turner's inclusion in the England squad, claiming that he had outshone England rivals Jonathan Woodgate and Matthew Upson. However, Hull City manager Phil Brown remarked at the time that such calls were "premature".

== Career statistics ==
As of match played 4 May 2019

Appearances and goals by club, season and competition
Club	Season	League			FA Cup		League Cup		Other		Total	
Club	Season	Division	Apps	Goals	Apps	Goals	Apps	Goals	Apps	Goals	Apps	Goals
Charlton Athletic	2002–03	Premier League	0	0	0	0	0	0	—		0	0
Charlton Athletic	2003–04	Premier League	0	0	0	0	0	0	—		0	0
Charlton Athletic	Total		0	0	0	0	0	0	—		0	0
Leyton Orient (loan)	2002–03	Third Division	7	1	—		—		—		7	1
Brentford	2004–05	League One	45	1	8	0	0	0	2 (Note: Appearances in League One play-offs)	0	55	1
Brentford	2005–06	League One	46	2	6	0	1	0	2	0	55	2
Brentford	Total		91	3	14	0	1	0	4	0	110	3
Hull City	2006–07	Championship	43	3	2	0	3	0	0	0	48	3
Hull City	2007–08	Championship	44	5	1	0	3	0	3 (Note: Appearances in Championship play-offs)	0	51	5
Hull City	2008–09	Premier League	38	4	4	1	1	0	—		43	5
Hull City	2009–10	Premier League	4	0	0	0	0	0	—		4	0
Hull City	Total		129	12	7	1	7	0	3	0	146	13
Sunderland	2009–10	Premier League	29	1	1	0	2	0	—		32	1
Sunderland	2010–11	Premier League	15	0	0	0	1	0	—		16	0
Sunderland	2011–12	Premier League	24	0	5	0	0	0	—		29	0
Sunderland	Total		68	1	6	0	3	0	—		77	1
Norwich City	2012–13	Premier League	26	3	0	0	2	0	—		28	3
Norwich City	2013–14	Premier League	22	0	0	0	0	0	—		22	0
Norwich City	2014–15	Championship	23	1	1	0	0	0	—		24	1
Norwich City	2016–17	Championship	0	0	0	0	2	0	—		2	0
Norwich City	Total		71	4	1	0	4	0	—		76	4
Norwich City U23	2016–17	—	—		—		—		1 (Note: Appearance in EFL Trophy)	0	9	1
Fulham (loan)	2014–15	Championship	9	1	—		—		—		9	1
Sheffield Wednesday (loan)	2015–16	Championship	11	1	1	0	0	0	0	0	12	1
Southend United	2017–18	League One	25	4	0	0	0	0	1	0	26	4
Southend United	2018–19	League One	36	1	2	0	0	0	1	0	39	1
Southend United	Total		61	5	2	0	0	0	2	0	65	5
Career total			447	28	31	1	15	0	10	0	503	29

== Honours ==
Hull City

- Football League Championship play-offs: 2008
