= Nicky Featherstone =

British footballer (born 1988)

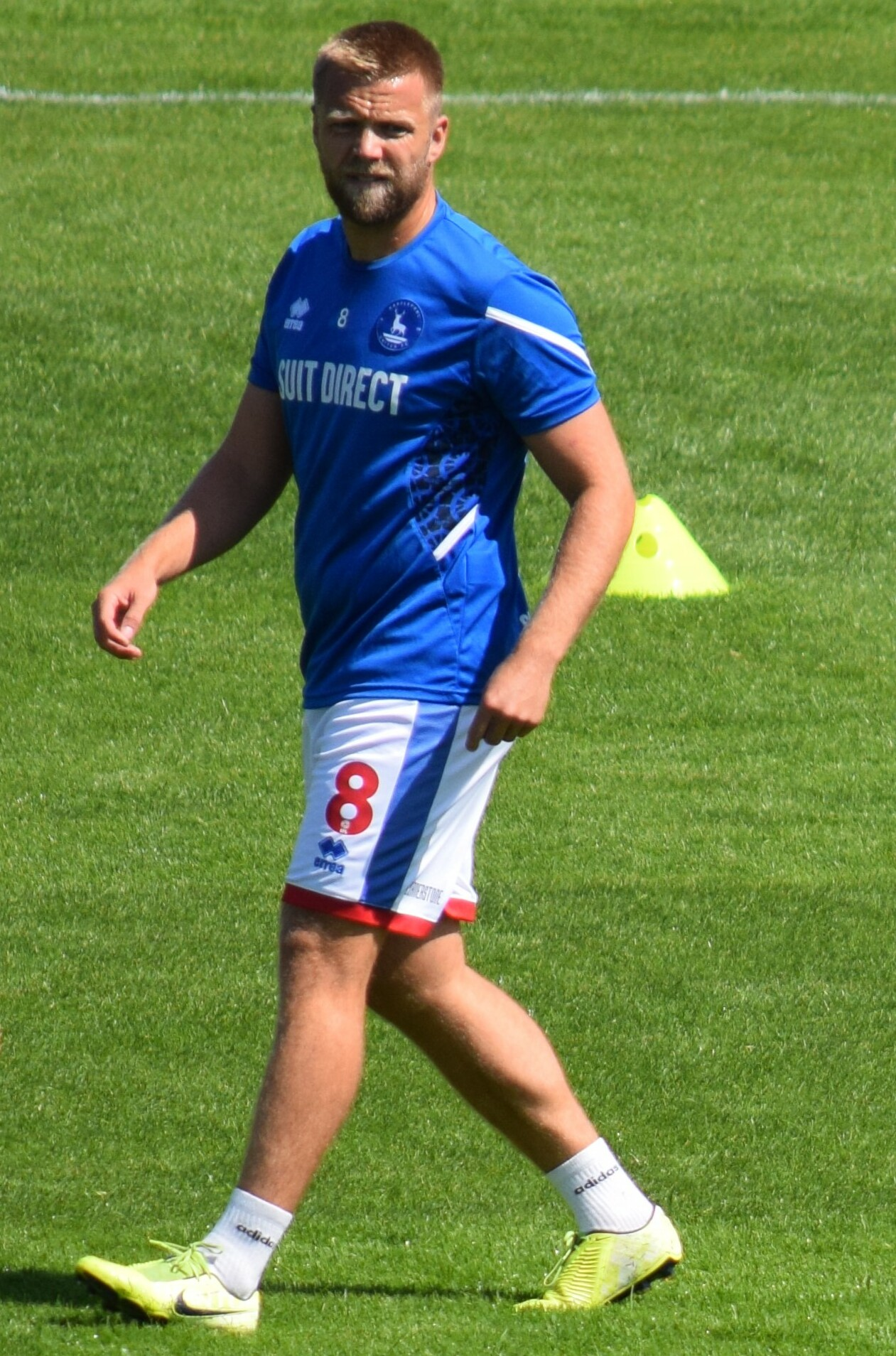
- Featherstone warming up for Hartlepool United in 2022

Personal information
- Full name: Nicky Lee Featherstone
- Date of birth: 22 September 1988 (age 38)
- Place of birth: Goole, Humberside, England
- Height: 5 ft 7 in (1.70 m)
- Position: Central midfielder

Team information
- Current team: Hull City (Professional Development Phase Coach)

Youth career
- ?–2006: Hull City

Senior career*
Years	Team	Apps	(Gls)
2006–2011	Hull City	8	(0)
2007	→ North Ferriby United (loan)		
2009–2010	→ Grimsby Town (loan)	7	(0)
2010	→ Grimsby Town (loan)	1	(0)
2010	→ Hereford United (loan)	7	(0)
2011–2012	Hereford United	58	(1)
2012–2014	Walsall	55	(0)
2014	Scunthorpe United	0	(0)
2014	Harrogate Town	4	(0)
2014–2023	Hartlepool United	336	(20)
2023–2025	Hartlepool United	78	(5)
Total		554	(26)

Managerial career
- 2025–2026: Hartlepool United
- * Club domestic league appearances and goals

Nicky Lee Featherstone (born 22 September 1988) is an English former professional football player and manager. He is currently a Professional Development Phase Coach at Hull City.

Featherstone signed for Hull City at the age of 8. He signed his first professional contract in December 2006 and made his first team debut that same month. Featherstone spent loans with North Ferriby United, Grimsby Town and Hereford United. He was released by Hull in January 2011, signing for League Two club Hereford on a permanent deal. Ahead of the 2012–13 season, he signed for League One club Walsall after Hereford were relegated. He spent two seasons with Walsall but left in 2014. Featherstone had brief spells with Scunthorpe United and Harrogate Town at the beginning of the 2014–15 season.

He was given a short-term deal with League Two club Hartlepool United in October 2014 which was later extended. He spent nine seasons with Hartlepool and was a member of the promotion-winning side in 2021 as well as suffering two relegations to non-League with the club. After initially leaving the club at the end of the 2022–23 season, he later re-joined the club in October 2023. He is Hartlepool's third highest all-time appearance maker.

== Club career ==
=== Hull City ===
Born in Goole, Humberside, Featherstone came through Hull City's youth structure. He joined the Centre of Excellence at the age of eight and, along with Will Atkinson, James Bennett and Matty Plummer, penned a two-and-a-half-year professional deal with the club in December 2006. After starring for the youth and reserve teams, he made his first team debut against Burnley on 30 December 2006, coming on as a late substitute. He was one of the nominees for the 'Wickes Young Apprentice Trophy' in 2007.

In September 2007 he signed a new contract to keep him at the club until June 2010, after a clause in his old contract stated that he would be offered a new one after making five first team appearances. During the 2007–08 season, Featherstone featured as a second-half substitute for Hull City against Chelsea in the third round of the League Cup. He played in the third round tie in the 2009–10 League Cup against Southend United.

On 19 November 2009 Featherstone joined League Two outfit Grimsby Town on an initial month's loan. He made his debut in a 0–0 draw with Lincoln City on 21 November. He eventually made seven appearances for Grimsby, and eventually returned to Hull on 3 January 2010. He re-signed for Grimsby for a second loan spell on 11 January 2010. On 1 February 2010, Featherstone returned to Hull early having asked to have his loan contract cut short, down to the fact he had fallen out of contention at Grimsby, having made only one appearance for The Mariners in his second loan spell.

During the 2010–11 season, despite being kept on at the club, Featherstone did not receive a squad number and eventually departed the club permanently in January 2011.

=== Hereford United ===
Featherstone joined League Two side Hereford United on an initial one-month loan on 4 November and signed a permanent deal to stay at Edgar Street in January. In May 2011 he signed a new one-year contract with the club. Following the conclusion of the 2011–12 season which saw Hereford relegated to the Conference National division, Featherstone seemingly departed United having failed to respond to the club's offer of a new contract.

=== Walsall ===
Featherstone signed with Football League One side Walsall on a one-year deal. He signed with The Saddlers on 6 August after impressing on trial with the West Midlands club.

=== Scunthorpe United ===
On 19 August 2014, it was announced that Featherstone had joined Football League One side Scunthorpe United on a "week to week" deal. He left the club on 2 September after his non-contract terms were cancelled.

=== Harrogate Town ===
On 3 October 2014, it was announced that Featherstone had joined Conference North side Harrogate Town.

=== Hartlepool United ===
On 31 October 2014, Featherstone returned to the Football League by signing with Hartlepool United on a short-term deal. The following day, Featherstone made his debut in a 2–2 draw with Newport County. On 2 February 2015, Featherstone extended his contract until the end of the season. On 25 June 2015, Featherstone signed a new deal with Hartlepool. On 27 August 2016, he scored his first goal for Hartlepool in another 2–2 draw with Newport County. On 7 March 2020, he made his 250th appearance for Hartlepool in a 1–0 home defeat to Ebbsfleet United. Featherstone signed a new contract at the end of the 2019–20 season after an impressive campaign.

In the 2020–21 campaign, Featherstone played an integral role in central midfield and formed a strong relationship with Mark Shelton and Gavan Holohan in midfield as Hartlepool qualified for the play-offs in 4th place. In the play-off eliminator against Bromley, Featherstone played an excellent long ball through to Rhys Oates to open the scoring for Pools in a 3–2 win. In the 2021 National League play-off final, Featherstone started in the final but missed a penalty in the shootout. However, Hartlepool prevailed 5–4 on penalties and were promoted back to the Football League. Featherstone lifted the play-off trophy alongside club captain Ryan Donaldson. Following Hartlepool's promotion back to League Two, Featherstone was announced as Hartlepool's new club captain and signed a new two-year contract.

In the 2022–23 season, he moved into the top ten most appearances list for Hartlepool United. Following Hartlepool's relegation to the National League at the end of the season, Featherstone left the club on 28 July 2023 having made 380 appearances. Following Featherstone's departure, manager John Askey said: "I may have only worked with Nicky for a few months but I know he will remembered as a club legend. A great player who offered me great support during last season and I can't thank him enough for his contributions."

On 2 October 2023, Featherstone re-joined Hartlepool United on a one month contract. On 3 November 2023, Featherstone extended his contract until the end of the 2023–24 season; he was also granted a testimonial match to celebrate his ten seasons of service to the club. During the season, he regained the captaincy from David Ferguson. At the end of the season, he was offered a new deal with the club. On 9 May 2024, Featherstone signed a dual contract as a player-coach at Hartlepool. Early in the 2024–25 season, Featherstone entered the top five appearance makers for Hartlepool describing it as "a very proud achievement". On 7 September 2024, Featherstone made his 400th start for the club in a 0–0 home draw with FC Halifax Town. On 14 December 2024, he made his 600th career appearance in a 0–0 away draw with Southend United. On 26 July 2025, Featherstone's testimonial took place with Hartlepool defeating a Leeds United XI 3–0 at Victoria Park.

== Coaching career ==
=== Hartlepool United ===
On 12 October 2025, Featherstone was appointed interim manager of Hartlepool United following the dismissal of Simon Grayson. After guiding Hartlepool to a seven game unbeaten run in the league, Featherstone was appointed permanent manager on 5 December 2025. Featherstone's unveiling referred to him as a 'former midfielder', indicating he had retired as a player.

On 17 April 2026, it was announced that, following a comprehensive review of the club's football operations, Featherstone was to step down from his position as manager following the conclusion of the 2025–26 season. Featherstone enjoyed a mixed spell in charge. While he oversaw impressive victories against title-chasing Rochdale and top seven side Carlisle United, he also suffered a humiliating FA Trophy exit at home to eighth-tier side Anstey Nomads and an emphatic 7–0 defeat at Wealdstone. He ultimately led Hartlepool to a ninth placed finish, two places outside the play-offs.

=== Hull City ===
In September 2026, Featherstone joined Premier League side Hull City as a Professional Development Phase Coach. Upon the appointment, Featherstone said "I was here from eight until I was around 23, so 15 years I was at the club, and for my career to come full circle is nice. To be able to be home again and take this opportunity is great; it is a brilliant opportunity at the right time for me."

== Career statistics ==
Appearances and goals by club, season and competition
Club	Season	League			FA Cup		League Cup		Other		Total	
Club	Season	Division	Apps	Goals	Apps	Goals	Apps	Goals	Apps	Goals	Apps	Goals
Hull City	2006–07	Championship	2	0	1	0	0	0	0	0	3	0
Hull City	2007–08	Championship	6	0	0	0	3	0	0	0	9	0
Hull City	2008–09	Premier League	0	0	1	0	1	0	0	0	2	0
Hull City	2009–10	Premier League	0	0	0	0	2	0	0	0	2	0
Total			8	0	2	0	6	0	0	0	16	0
Grimsby Town (loan)	2009–10	League Two	8	0	0	0	0	0	0	0	8	0
Hereford United	2010–11	League Two	27	1	5	0	0	0	0	0	32	1
Hereford United	2011–12	League Two	38	0	1	0	1	0	0	0	40	0
Total			65	1	6	0	1	0	0	0	72	1
Walsall	2012–13	League One	31	0	2	0	2	0	1 (Note: Appearance(s) in Football League Trophy)	0	36	0
Walsall	2013–14	League One	24	0	1	0	2	0	1	0	28	0
Total			55	0	3	0	4	0	2	0	64	0
Harrogate Town	2014–15	Conference North	4	0	0	0	0	0	0	0	4	0
Hartlepool United	2014–15	League Two	25	0	2	0	0	0	0	0	27	0
Hartlepool United	2015–16	League Two	44	0	4	0	2	0	1	0	51	0
Hartlepool United	2016–17	League Two	43	3	2	0	0	0	1 (Note: Appearance(s) in EFL Trophy)	0	46	3
Hartlepool United	2017–18	National League	36	0	2	0	0	0	0	0	38	0
Hartlepool United	2018–19	National League	43	4	3	0	0	0	2 (Note: Appearance(s) in FA Trophy)	0	48	4
Hartlepool United	2019–20	National League	35	3	5	1	0	0	1	0	41	4
Hartlepool United	2020–21	National League	37	4	2	0	0	0	4 (Note: One appearance and one goal in FA Trophy, three appearances in National League play-offs)	1	43	5
Hartlepool United	2021–22	League Two	40	5	4	0	1	0	2	0	47	5
Hartlepool United	2022–23	League Two	33	1	4	0	1	0	1	0	39	1
Hartlepool United	2023–24	National League	33	3	1	0	0	0	2	1	36	4
Hartlepool United	2024–25	National League	44	2	2	0	0	0	0	0	46	2
Hartlepool United	2025–26	National League	1	0	0	0	0	0	0	0	1	0
Total			414	25	31	1	4	0	14	2	463	28
Career total			554	26	44	1	15	0	16	2	625	29

== Managerial statistics ==
As of match played 25 April 2026

Managerial record by team and tenure
Team	From	To	Record				
Team	From	To	P	W	D	L	Win %
Hartlepool United	12 October 2025	25 April 2026	34	14	8	12	41.2
Total			34	14	8	12	41.2

== Honours ==
Hartlepool United

- National League play-offs: 2021
