= Matty Plummer =

English footballer

Personal information
- Full name: Matthew Robert Plummer
- Date of birth: 18 January 1989 (age 37)
- Place of birth: Hull, England
- Position: Defender

Team information
- Current team: Beverley Town

Youth career
- 1998–2006: Hull City

Senior career*
Years	Team	Apps	(Gls)
2006–2009	Hull City	0	(0)
2009	Darlington	8	(0)
2010	North Ferriby United	1	(0)
2010	FC Halifax Town	?	(?)
2010–2011	Bridlington Town	?	(?)
2011	Bradford Park Avenue	?	(?)
2011–2012	Scarborough Athletic	8	(0)
2012	Garforth Town	9	(2)
2012–	Scarborough Athletic	44	(5)
2015–2016	Hull United		
2016–2021	AFC Mansfield		
2021–2022	North Ferriby		
2022-2022	Bridlington Town		
2022-	Beverley Town		
- * Club domestic league appearances and goals as of 19:39, 16 August 2013 (UTC)

Matthew Robert Plummer (born 18 January 1989) is an English professional footballer who plays as a defender for Beverley Town in the Northern Counties East Division One. He has previously played in the Football League for Hull City and Darlington.

== Career ==
=== Hull City ===
Plummer signed his first professional contract, a two-and-a-half-year deal, with Championship side Hull City in December 2006 after beginning his career with the club as a trainee in 1998 along with Will Atkinson, James Bennett, and Nicky Featherstone. Although the centre-back never played for Hull's senior team, he was a regular in their reserve team. Plummer was also an unused substitute in Hulls' senior games in the tie against Watford in the League Cup in 2006 and Middlesbrough in the FA Cup in 2007. His contract with Hull expired during the summer of 2009 and he subsequently left the club.

=== Darlington ===
Following his departure from Hull, Plummer joined League Two side Darlington. Plummer made his debut for Darlington on 8 August 2009 against Aldershot coming on as a 74th-minute substitute. He also featured against Leeds United in the League Cup, again coming off the bench. Plummer made his full debut for Darlington on 18 August 2009 against Crewe Alexandra. During this time, Plummer was a winner of the 'crossbar challenge' conducted by the football show Soccer AM. Having played eight league games, manager Steve Staunton released him from his contract along with two other first team players, David Knight, and James Bennett in December 2009.

=== Non-League ===
In March 2010, Plummer joined Northern Premier League Premier Division side North Ferriby United, but left after making just one league appearance. Plummer finished the season at Central Midlands League side Westella & Willerby before signing for Northern Premier League Premier Division side FC Halifax Town ahead of season 2010–11. After being released by FC Halifax in November 2010, Plummer briefly joined Northern Counties East League Premier Division side Bridlington Town until signing for Northern Premier League Premier Division side Bradford Park Avenue in January 2011. In December 2011 he signed for Northern Counties East League Premier Division side Scarborough Athletic and made eight first team appearances, starting four, before moving to Northern Premier League Division One North side Garforth Town at the end of the 2011–12 season. He re-signed for Northern Counties East League Premier Division side Scarborough Athletic during the summer of 2012. He remained at the club until 2015 when he joined Hull United. In May 2016 he signed for A.F.C. Mansfield. His most recent club is Beverley Town, where he joined in the 2022/23 season.

== Honours ==
=== As a player ===
- Hull City
  - Football League Championship Play-off final winner: 2007–08
- Scarborough Athletic
  - Northern Counties East League Premier Division winner: 2012–13

MOTM v Harchester United (Juniors debut)
