= Caleb Folan =

Republic of Ireland international footballer (born 1982)

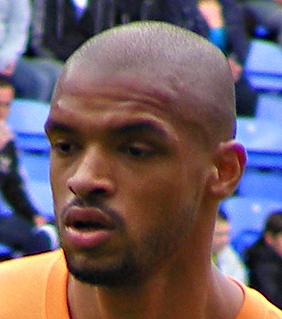
- Folan warming up for Hull City in 2010

Personal information
- Full name: Caleb Colman Folan
- Date of birth: 26 October 1982 (age 44)
- Place of birth: Leeds, England
- Height: 6 ft 2 in (1.88 m)
- Position: Forward

Youth career
- ?–2001: Leeds United

Senior career*
| Years | Team | Apps | (Gls) |
| 2001–2003 | Leeds United | 0 | (0) |
| 2001 | → Rushden & Diamonds (loan) | 6 | (0) |
| 2001 | → Hull City (loan) | 1 | (0) |
| 2003–2007 | Chesterfield | 102 | (15) |
| 2007 | Wigan Athletic | 15 | (2) |
| 2007–2011 | Hull City | 55 | (12) |
| 2009 | → Middlesbrough (loan) | 1 | (0) |
| 2011 | Colorado Rapids | 26 | (6) |
| 2012 | Birmingham City | 0 | (0) |
| 2013 | T-Team | 10 | (0) |
| 2013 | Bradford City | 6 | (0) |
| 2014–2015 | Kanbawza | 17 | (13) |
| Total | | 239 | (48) |

International career
| 2008 | Republic of Ireland B | 1 | (1) |
| 2008–2009 | Republic of Ireland | 7 | (0) |
- * Club domestic league appearances and goals

Caleb Colman Folan (born 26 October 1982) is a former professional footballer who played as a forward. Born in England, he represented the Republic of Ireland in international football, qualifying through grandparents on his maternal side from Galway.

== Club career ==
=== Early career ===
Born in Leeds, West Yorkshire, Folan started his career at hometown club Leeds United, spending brief spells on loan at Rushden & Diamonds and Hull City before making a permanent move to Chesterfield in February 2003.

In April 2006 he underwent a cartilage operation on a recurring knee injury. In October, he scored the winning goal against West Ham United in Chesterfield's League Cup victory, after which he signed a one-year contract extension.

=== Wigan Athletic ===
After a series of impressive performances for Chesterfield, Folan was linked with a January transfer to Premier League side Wigan Athletic, and on 26 January 2007 he completed a £500,000 transfer, signing a three-and-a-half-year deal. Wigan manager Paul Jewell stated: "He's strong, he's aggressive, he's got a finisher's instinct and I think he will add competition in an area where the squad needs bolstering." He made his debut for Wigan against Reading on 30 January 2007, and on 21 February, scored his first goal for the club, an equaliser against Watford. On 3 March he scored the winner against Manchester City away at the City of Manchester Stadium in a 1–0 victory.

=== Hull City ===
Championship team Hull City revealed their interest in signing him in August 2007. However, Wigan manager Chris Hutchings said he was not looking to transfer Folan. On 31 August Folan eventually did return to Hull on a three-year contract for a fee of £1 million, which broke the record highest fee paid by the club. After signing, he insisted he was not going to let the price tag pile pressure onto him and that he had arrived at the club to score goals.

On his debut for Hull in a 2–1 defeat against Blackpool in September, Folan was taken to hospital after being stretchered off the pitch wearing a neck brace. He was kept overnight at Victoria Hospital in Blackpool. An ankle injury caused him to miss several more matches, and in March 2008 he incurred a three-match ban after being sent off in a game against Burnley.

He returned to score several goals from the bench during Hull City's successful run-in. On the first day of the Premier League season, Hull played their first ever game in that league against Fulham, and Folan came on as a substitute and scored the winning goal in a 2–1 victory for Hull. He was sent off against Liverpool on 25 April 2009 for kicking out at Martin Škrtel.

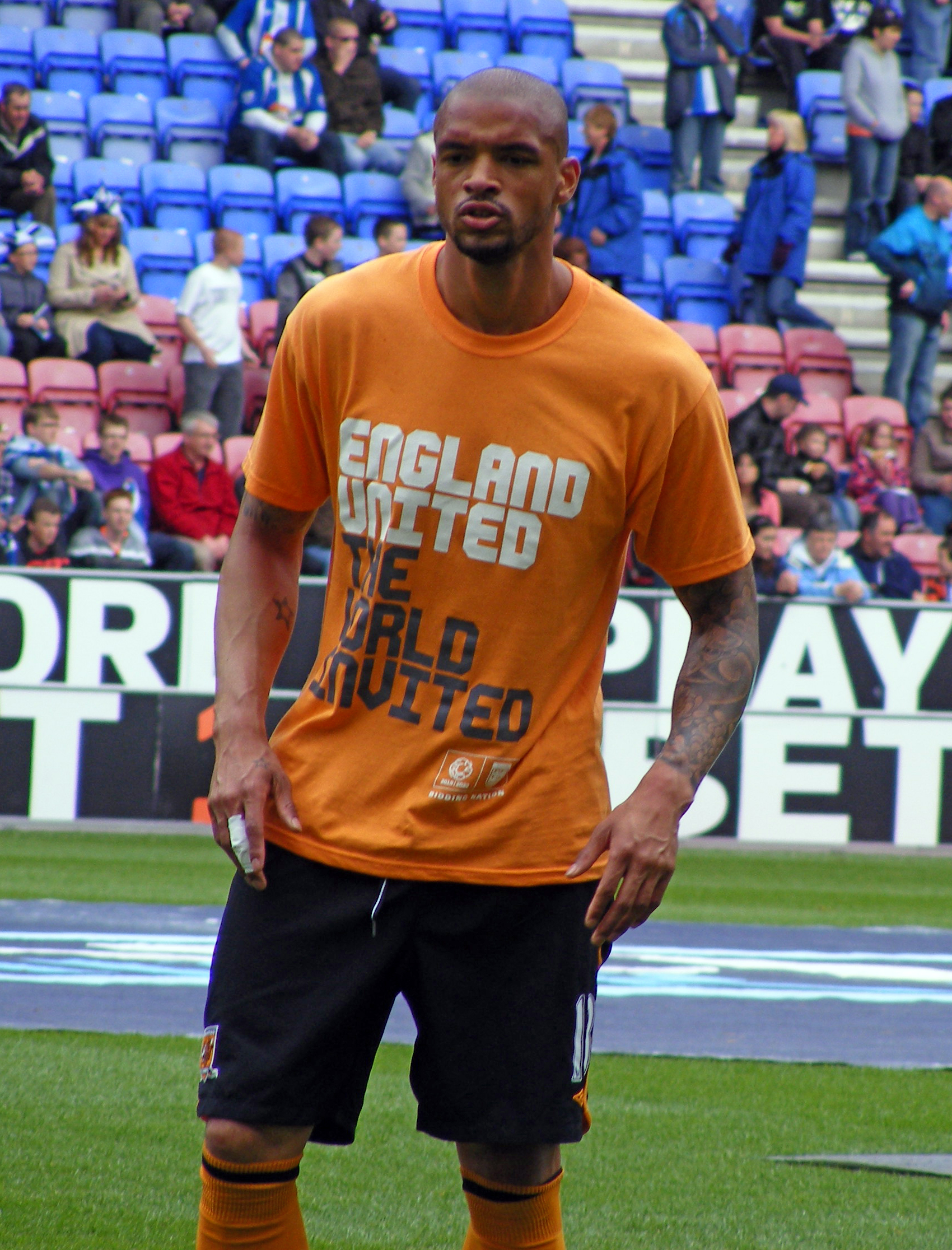
Folan warming up for Hull City in 2010

On 17 September 2009, Folan was loaned for three months to Middlesbrough of the Championship, and he made his debut as a substitute in a 5–0 defeat to West Bromwich Albion. Just nine days later Folan suffered a torn hamstring. After Hull manager Phil Brown criticised Folan on his appearances for Hull during the 2009–10 season, Folan hit back by saying Brown's comments were "laughable and childish". However, upon Folan's return to Hull, Brown offered him a "clean slate".

=== Colorado Rapids ===
After a lengthy negotiation with Hull City, Folan was able to complete a transfer to Colorado Rapids of Major League Soccer on 16 March 2011. He made his MLS debut on 26 March in a 1–0 victory over Chivas USA, and scored his first goals in Major League Soccer on 3 April in a 4–1 win over D.C. United.

Folan scored six goals during the 2011 season before moving on prior to the 2012 preseason. The Rapids announced on 3 February 2012 that the club had parted ways with Folan by mutual consent.

=== Birmingham City ===
After a trial, Folan signed for Championship club Birmingham City on 29 February until the end of the season.

Folan suffered a setback during his training program at Birmingham City picking up a nerve injury, which eventually would go on to rule him out of playing football for the good part of a year. As a result, he was unable to appear for the blues and was never included in the 16-man matchday squad, Folan was released when his contract expired.

=== T-Team ===
On 1 December 2012, after a lengthy period sidelined due to a previous injury, Folan announced on his official Twitter page that he had joined T-Team in the Malaysia Super League and it was confirmed shortly after. He played alongside his former Hull City teammate, Netherlands international George Boateng, while playing for the club. Folan scored in the team's first pre-season game against Malaysia Super League outfit ATM FA and again on his home debut in a 2–2 draw against close rivals Terengganu FA.

But, on 27 March 2013, after struggling to find his previous form, Folan left the club by mutual consent after failing to score in 10 appearances.

=== Bradford City ===
On 28 September 2013, after training with Bradford City, Folan signed a three-month contract with the club. He made his debut on 5 October, in a 2–0 win against Walsall. Folan left Bradford City on 26 December 2013.

In March 2014 Folan turned down an offer to play for the North American Soccer League Canadian based outfit FC Edmonton in pursuit to return and play his football in Asia.

=== Kanbawza ===
Folan spent the 2015 season with Kanbawza FC of the Myanmar National League; he scored 13 goals from 17 league appearances.

== International career ==
Through his grandfather, who was from Inis Mór, and his grandmother, from Galway, Folan is eligible to play for the Republic of Ireland. In March 2007, manager Steve Staunton called on the 'granny rule' to bring Folan into his squad for the UEFA Euro 2008 qualifying campaign, after a passport was issued at the 11th hour. The decision attracted comment for overlooking other in-form strikers playing outside the Premier League and with closer ties to the Republic of Ireland.

However, Folan was forced to pull out of the squad due to injury. A hamstring tear also forced Folan out of the Republic's squad for games against Ecuador and Bolivia in May 2007.

In October 2008, under new manager Giovanni Trapattoni, Folan was one of several uncapped players selected to play for a Republic of Ireland XI in a challenge match against Nottingham Forest, scoring the first goal in a 2–0 win. He was added to the squad for the subsequent 2010 FIFA World Cup qualifier against Cyprus and appeared as an injury-time substitute. He was brought on as a substitute against Italy in the World Cup qualifiers, and set up the equalising goal scored by Robbie Keane in the 87th minute.

== Personal life ==
Folan was born on 16 October 1982 in Leeds, England. After retiring from professional football, he worked as a massage therapist. He has enjoyed creating art as a hobby.

== Honours ==
Hull City

- Football League Championship play-offs: 2008

== See also ==
- List of Republic of Ireland international footballers born outside the Republic of Ireland
