= James Bennett (footballer, born 1988) =

British footballer

Personal information
- Full name: James Richard Bennett
- Date of birth: 4 September 1988 (age 38)
- Place of birth: Beverley, England
- Height: 5 ft 10 in (1.78 m)
- Position: Midfielder

Youth career
- ?–2006: Hull City

Senior career*
Years	Team	Apps	(Gls)
2006–2009	Hull City		
2008–2009	→ Lincoln City (loan)		
2009–2010	Darlington	7	(0)
2009–2010	Ossett Town		
2010–2012	Bridlington Town	150	(26)
2011–2012	North Ferriby United		
2012–2015	Scarborough Athletic	120	(10)
2015–????	Pickering Town		
- * Club domestic league appearances and goals

James Richard Bennett (born 4 September 1988) is an English former footballer. He played for Hull City, Lincoln City, Darlington, Bridlington Town, North Ferriby United and Scarborough Athletic.

== Career ==
Born in Beverley, East Riding of Yorkshire, Bennett started his career as a trainee with Hull City. In December 2006 he, along with Will Atkinson, Nicky Featherstone and Matty Plummer, penned a two-and-a-half-year professional deal with the club. He failed to break into Phil Brown's senior team and on 26 March 2009 joined League Two club Lincoln City on loan until the end of the 2008–09 season. He failed to make an appearance for the club during his loan spell, being restricted to three unused substitute appearances in the club's final three league games of the season.

Bennett was one of eight players released by Hull in the summer of 2009 and joined League Two side Darlington. He made his debut for Darlington on 29 August 2009 against Cheltenham Town coming on as a substitute. Bennett left Darlington in December 2009, having played seven league games, when manager Steve Staunton released him from his contract along with two other first team players, David Knight and Matty Plummer.

In August 2010 he signed for Bridlington Town debuting in the 2–1 Northern Counties East League win at Brighouse Town on 21 August 2010. In December 2011, he moved to join North Ferriby United. In July 2012 he signed for Scarborough Athletic, in the Northern Counties East League.

=== Coaching career ===
In the summer of 2018 Bennett became assistant manager to Dave Ricardo at Barton Town F.C.

Bennett works as the Director of Football at a local college Bishop Burton College.

Bennett joined Beverley Town F.C. as assistant manager to Dave Ricardo in the summer of 2024.
