= Beardsley (surname) =

Beardsley is an English surname, a variant spelling of Bardsley, a toponymic surname associated with the village of Bardsley in Lancashire, England.

Notable people with the name include:

- Ally Beardsley (born 1988), American comedian
- Aubrey Beardsley (1872–1898), English illustrator and author
- Bartholomew Crannell Beardsley (1775–1855), Canadian politician
- Charles T. Beardsley Jr. (1861–1937), American architect
- Chris Beardsley (born 1984), English association football player
- Christina Beardsley (born 1951), English Anglican priest
- Craig Beardsley (born 1960), American swimmer
- Dick Beardsley (born 1956), American marathoner
- Don Beardsley (born 1946), Scottish footballer
- Doug Beardsley (born 1941), Canadian poet and educator
- Eben Edwards Beardsley (1818–1892), American Episcopal priest
- Edmund Beardsley Underwood (1853–1928), Governor of American Samoa
- Edward Beardsley (died 2017), American artist
- Eleanor Beardsley, American radio journalist
- Elizabeth Beardsley Butler (1884–1911), American social investigator
- Fred Beardsley (1856–1939), English footballer
- Grenville Beardsley (1898–1960), American politician
- Helen Beardsley (1930–2000), American writer
- Henry M. Beardsley (1858–1938), American politician
- Herman R. Beardsley (1800–1878), American judge
- Hezekiah Beardsley (1748–1790), American physician
- Irene Beardsley (born 1935), American mountaineer
- Jason Beardsley (born 1989), English footballer
- John Beardsley (art historian), American author, curator, and educator
- John Beardsley (cleric) (1732–1808), Canadian clergyman
- John Beardsley (colonel) (1816–1906), Union Army colonel
- John Beardsley (New York politician) (1783–1857), American politician
- Joseph W. Beardsley (1820–1868), Wisconsin politician
- Ken Beardsley, Australian rules footballer
- Kevin Beardsley, New Zealand sprinter and school principal
- Levi Beardsley (1785–1857), New York lawyer and politician
- Liz Beardsley (born 2003), American soccer player
- Mabel Beardsley (1871–1916), English actress
- Melville W. Beardsley (1913–1998), American inventor and aeronautical engineer
- Mikaela Beardsley (born 1970), American film producer
- Monroe Beardsley (1915–1985), American philosopher
- Nick Beardsley, Australian rules footballer
- Peter Beardsley (born 1961), English footballer
- Ralph Beardsley (1888–1920), American racing driver
- Richard Beardsley (diplomat) (1838–1876), American diplomat
- Robert Beardsley (1942–2025), American oceanographer
- Samuel Beardsley (1790–1860), American politician and judge
- Scott C. Beardsley, American-French academic
- Sidney Burr Beardsley (1823–1890), American judge
- William Beardsley (politician) (born 1942), American politician from Maine
- William Beardsley (settler) (c. 1605–1661), Settler of Connecticut
- William H. Beardsley (1850–1925), American irrigation pioneer
- William J. Beardsley (1872–1934), American architect
- William S. Beardsley (1901–1954), American politician

== See also ==
- Beardsley (disambiguation)
- Bardsley (surname)
- Barnsley (surname)
- Barsley
- Beardslee
