= Bardsley (surname) =

Bardsley is an English toponymic surname associated with the village of Bardsley in Lancashire, England.

Notable people with the name include:

- Anne Bardsley, New Zealand–American academic
- Charlotte Bardsley (born 2002), English table tennis player
- Cuthbert Bardsley (1907–1991), British Anglican bishop
- Cyril Bardsley (1870–1940), British Anglican bishop
- Cyril Bardsley (cyclist) (1931–2020), English cyclist
- David Bardsley (born 1964), English footballer
- Doris Bardsley (1895–1968), UK born Australian nurse
- Edwin Bardsley (1883–1916), English footballer
- Eric Bardsley (1903–1958), Australian rugby union player
- Gibson Bardsley (born 1989), American soccer player
- Grace Bardsley (1920–1972), Australian Indigenous rights activist
- James Bardsley (priest) (1805–1886), English cleric
- James Lomax Bardsley (1801–1876), English physician
- John Bardsley (1835–1904), Bishop of Carlisle
- John Bardsley (footballer) (1886–1971), English footballer
- Joseph Bardsley (1825–1896), Anglican clergyman
- Julia Bardsley, British artist
- Karen Bardsley (born 1984), American-born footballer
- Kristian Bardsley (born 1972), Australian rules footballer and coach
- Lily Bardsley (born 1995), Australian cricketer
- Lizzy Bardsley (born c. 1973), British television personality
- Michele Bardsley (born 1970), American novelist
- Mick Bardsley (1894–1983), Australian cricketer
- Phil Bardsley (born 1985), Scottish footballer
- Roanne Bardsley, Welsh television screenwriter
- Robert Bardsley (1890–1952), English cricketer and colonial administrator
- Samuel Argent Bardsley (1764–1850), British doctor
- Tanya Bardsley (born 1981), British television personality
- Tim Bardsley, Canadian lawyer and politician
- Tony Bardsley (born 1945), Canadian tennis player
- Warren Bardsley (1882–1954), Australian cricketer

== See also ==
- Bardsley (disambiguation)
- Barnsley (surname)
- Barsley
- Beardsley (surname)
- Beardslee
