= List of Hull City A.F.C. players =

This is a list of players who have played at least 100 or more senior games for Hull City A.F.C. Other notable players who have not hit this threshold, including those who have had at least one senior international cap while on the active squad list at the time, are also included. Their reasons for inclusion need to be stated in the Notes column. Names in Bold are currently at the club.

Statistics are as of 23 May 2026

== Players ==
Name	Nationality	Position	Years with Team	Total Appearances	Goals	References
Greg Abbott	England	Midfielder	1992–1996	141	18	
Alf Ackerman	South Africa	Forward	1950–1951; 1953–1955	103	51	
Stan Alexander	England	Forward	1926–1931	108	46	
Neil Allison	England	Defender	1991–1996	124	4	
Sone Aluko	Nigeria	Forward	2012–2016	108	14	
Ian Ashbee	England	Midfielder	2002–2011	264	12	
Billy Askew	England	Midfielder	1982–1990	300	20	
Graeme Atkinson	England	Midfielder	1990–1994	170	26	
Frankie Banks	England	Defender	1967–1976	334	7	
Bruce Bannister	England	Forward	1977–1980	101	24	
Nick Barmby	England	Midfielder	2004–2012	197	32	(Note: Also manager from 2011–2012)
Don Beardsley	England	Defender	1966–1973	143	0	
Matt Bell	England	Defender	1919–1931	423	1	
Tom Berry	England	Defender	1947–1957	295	1	
Tommy Bleakley	England	Midfielder	1918–1930	389	7	
Billy Bly	England	Goalkeeper	1938–1959	438	0	
Dennis Booth	England	Midfielder	1980–1985	151	2	
Jarrod Bowen	England	Forward	2014–2020	131	54	
Gary Brabin	England	Midfielder	1999–2001	111	9	
Bill Bradbury	England	Forward	1955–1960	190	89	
Robbie Brady	Republic of Ireland	Midfielder	2011–2015	124	14	
Alex Bruce	Northern Ireland	Defender	2012–2017	104	1	
Brian Bulless	England	Forward	1949–1964	357	35	
Frankie Bunn	England	Forward	1985–1987	112	30	
Reece Burke	England	Defender	2018–2021	110	5	
Dennis Butler	England	Defender	1963–1969	246	0	
Ian Butler	England	Forward	1965–1973	339	70	
Fraizer Campbell	England	Forward	2007–2008 (loan); 2017–2019	114	33	-
Raich Carter	England	Forward	1948–1952	150	62	
James Chester	Wales	Defender	2011–2015	171	8	-
Chris Chilton	England	Forward	1960–1971	477	222	
Doug Clarke	England	Forward	1955–1965	411	87	
Jock Collier	Scotland	Midfielder	1920–1926	185	0	
Les Collinson	England	Midfielder	1953–1967	332	16	
**Lewie Coyle**	England	Defender	2020–present	232	4	-
Jackie Crawford	England	Midfielder	1920–1923	133	13	
Brian Cripsey	England	Midfielder	1953–1958	159	20	
Stuart Croft	England	Defender	1973–1981	215	6	
Peter Daniel	England	Midfielder	1974–1978	128	9	
Andy Davidson	Scotland	Defender	1952–1968	579	19	-
Curtis Davies	England	Defender	2013–2017	144	7	-
Dai Davies	Wales	Forward	1935–1947	152	33	
Andy Dawson	England	Defender	2003–2013	317	8	-
Michael Dawson	England	Defender	2014–2018	132	9	-
Nick Deacy	Wales	Forward	1980–1982	105	9	
Damien Delaney	Republic of Ireland	Defender	2002–2008	239	5	-
Stanley Denby	England	Midfielder	1932–1937	130	3	
Roger DeVries	England	Defender	1970–1980	362	1	
Stan Dixon	England	Midfielder	1926–1930	107	3	-
Ian Dobson	England	Defender	1975–1980	106	7	
Greg Docherty	Scotland	Midfielder	2020–2024	142	7	-
Andrew Duncan	Scotland	Forward	1931–1935	114	31	
Dally Duncan	Scotland	Forward	1928–1932	122	50	
Denis Durham	England	Midfielder	1947–1960	289	7	
Tom Eaves	England	Forward	2019–2022	108	18	-
Joe Edelston	England	Midfielder	1913–1920	117	0	
Keith Edwards	England	Forward	1978–1981; 1988–1989	220	97	
Mike Edwards	England	Defender	1997–2003	208	8	
Callum Elder	Australia	Defender	2019–2023	137	1	-
Stuart Elliott	Northern Ireland	Forward	2002–2008	211	68	
Ahmed Elmohamady	Egypt	Defender	2012–2017	217	11	-
Craig Fagan	England	Forward	2004–2007; 2008–2011	143	20	-
Paul Feasey	England	Defender	1953–1965	304	0	
Alan Fettis	England	Goalkeeper	1991–1996; 2003–2004	178	2	
Ryan France	England	Forward/Defender	2003–2009	133	6	-
Richard Garcia	Australia	Midfielder	2007–2012	128	10	-
Jacob Greaves	England	Defender	2019–2024	177	6	-
Mark Greaves	England	Defender	1996–2002	204	12	-
Vince Grimes	England	Midfielder	1973–1978	104	11	
Kamil Grosicki	Poland	Forward	2017–2020	123	25	-
Abel Hernandez	Uruguay	Forward	2014–2018	111	39	(Note: Player of the year for 2015-16)
Jack Hill	England	Defender	1931–1934	102	4	(Note: Also manager from 1934–1936)
George Honeyman	England	Midfielder	2019–2022	127	10	(Note: Player of the year for 2020-21)
Micky Horswill	England	Midfielder	1978–1982	100	6	
Ken Houghton	England	Forward	1965–1973	304	91	(Note: Also manager from 1978-1979)
Tom Huddlestone	England	Midfielder	2013–2017; 2021–2022	173	8	-
Matt Ingram	England	Goalkeeper	2019–2024	111	0	-
Jackson Irvine	Australia	Midfielder	2017–2020	112	10	
Viggo Jensen	Denmark	Midfielder	1948–1956	335	54	
Alfie Jones	England	Defender	2020–2025	191	2	-
Warren Joyce	England	Midfielder	1995 (loan); 1996–2000	170	19	(Note: Also manager from 1998–2000)
Robert Koren	Slovenia	Midfielder	2010–2014	151	29	
Keane Lewis-Potter	England	Forward	2019–2022	122	30	-
Jake Livermore	England	Midfielder	2013–2017	144	9	-
George Maddison	England	Goalkeeper	1924–1938	456	0	
Ryan Mason	England	Midfielder	2016–2018	20	2	(Note: Current record transfer purchase (approximately £12,000,000))
Allan McGregor	Scotland	Goalkeeper	2013–2018	148	0	-
Steve McClaren	England	Midfielder	1979–1985	215	20	
Sean McLoughlin	Republic of Ireland	Defender	2019–2025	146	0	-
John McSeveney	England	Forward	1961–1965	183	70	
Paul McShane	Republic of Ireland	Defender	2008–2009 (loan); 2009–2015	136	5	-
David Meyler	Republic of Ireland	Midfielder	2012–2018	181	16	-
Paddy Mills	England	Forward	1920–1926; 1929–1933	291	110	
Paul Musselwhite	England	Goalkeeper	2000–2004	104	0	-
Boaz Myhill	Wales	Goalkeeper	2003–2010	277	0	-
Tony Norman	England	Goalkeeper	1980–1988	442	0	
Andy Payton	England	Forward	1985–1991	165	57	(Note: Player of the year for 1989-90 and 1990-91)
Richard Peacock	England	Midfielder	1993–1999	203	24	-
Stuart Pearson	England	Forward	1968–1974	150	45	
Sam Ricketts	Wales	Defender	2006–2009	129	1	
Gregor Rioch	England	Defender	1996–1999	106	10	
Garreth Roberts	England	Midfielder	1978–1991	487	59	(Note: Player of the year for 1980-81 and 1983-84)
Andrew Robertson	Scotland	Defender	2014–2017	115	5	-
Liam Rosenior	England	Defender	2010–2015	161	2	-
Andy Saville	England	Forward	1983–1989; 1998	121	28	
Jacky Smith	England	Forward	1905–1910	168	102	
**Regan Slater**	England	Midfielder	2020–2021 (loan); 2022–present	196	10	
Peter Skipper	England	Defender	1979–1980; 1982–1988	338	21	
Sammy Stevens	England	Forward	1912–1920	161	93	
Arthur Temple	England	Forward	1907–1914	184	81	
Michael Turner	England	Defender	2006–2009	146	13	-
Ken Wagstaff	England	Forward	1964–1975	434	197	
Billy Whitehurst	England	Forward	1980–1986; 1988–1990	271	69	
Justin Whittle	England	Defender	1998–2004	219	3	-
Mike Williams	England	Goalkeeper	1962–1966	100	0	
Neil Williams	England	Defender	1984–1988	113	10	
Dean Windass	England	Forward	1991–1995; 2007–2009	270	89	-
