= 1973 Watney Cup final =

- Event: 1973 Watney Cup
Stoke City	Hull City
2	0
- Date: 18 August 1973
- Venue: Victoria Ground, Stoke-on-Trent
- Attendance: 18,159

The 1973 Watney Cup final was the final of the fourth and last Watney Cup. The match was held at the Victoria Ground in Stoke-on-Trent on 18 August 1973 and had an attendance of 18,159. It was contested by Stoke City and Hull City.

Stoke won the match 2–0, with Jimmy Greenhoff scoring both goals.

== Background ==
In the 1973 edition of the Watney Cup, Stoke City were one of two representatives of the First Division, alongside West Ham United. On the other hand, Hull City were one of the competition's Second Division sides, in tandem with Bristol City. In the first round, Stoke won 1–0 away at Plymouth Argyle courtesy of a Geoff Hurst goal. The Potters then beat Hull's division neighbours Bristol City to reach the final. Simultaneously, Hull had thrashed Mansfield Town 3–0 away in the first round, before seeing off the previous year's Watney Cup winners, Bristol Rovers, in the semi-finals.

== Route to the final ==
=== Stoke City ===
Quarter-final: Plymouth Argyle 0–1 Stoke City (11 August)

Semi-final: Stoke City 4–1 Bristol City (14 August)

=== Hull City ===
Quarter-final: Mansfield Town 0–3 Hull City (11 August)

Semi-final: Bristol Rovers 0–1 Hull City (14 August)

== Match details ==
18 August 1973
15:00 (BST)

Stoke City	2–0	Hull City
Greenhoff 16', 67'

Victoria Ground, Stoke-on-Trent
Attendance: 18,159
Referee: Unknown

Stoke City	Hull City

GK	1	(England) John Farmer
RB	2	(England) Jackie Marsh
CB	5	(England) Denis Smith (c)
CB	6	(England) Alan Bloor
LB	3	(England) Mike Pejic
RM	7	(Scotland) Jimmy Robertson
CM	4	(Wales) John Mahoney
CM	11	(England) Sean Haslegrave
LM	10	(Republic of Ireland) Terry Conroy
CF	8	(England) Jimmy Greenhoff
CF	9	(England) Geoff Hurst
Manager:
(England) Tony Waddington

GK	1	(England) Jeff Wealands
RB	2	(England) Frankie Banks
CB	5	(England) Steve Deere
CB	6	(England) John Kaye (c)
LB	3	(England) Roger DeVries
RM	4	(England) Chris Galvin
CM	7	(England) Malcolm Lord
CM	8	(Scotland) Jimmy McGill
LM	11	(England) Roy Greenwood
CF	9	(England) Stuart Pearson
CF	10	(England) Ken Wagstaff	Substituted off
Substitutes:
CF	12	(England) Jeff Hemmerman	Substituted on
Manager:
(Northern Ireland) Terry Neill

MATCH RULES

- 90 minutes.
- Penalty shoot-out if scores still level.
- Maximum of two substitutions.
