= Beardsley =

Beardsley may refer to:

== Places in the United States ==
- Beardsley, Arizona, a populated place
- Beardsley, Kansas, a ghost town
- Beardsley, Minnesota, a city
- Beardsley Canal, Kern County, California, an irrigation canal
- Beardsley Creek, New York

== People ==
- Beardsley (surname), a list of people with the surname
- Aubrey Beardsley (1872–1898), English illustrator, artist, and author
- Beardsley Ruml (1894–1960), American statistician, economist, philanthropist, planner and businessman
- William H. Beardsley (1850-1925), Arizona business man who helped create an irrigation system for farmers.

== Other uses ==
- Beardsley Zoo, a zoological garden in Bridgeport, Connecticut, United States
- Beardsley Electric Company - see List of defunct automobile manufacturers of the United States
- Allenby Beardsley, a Mobile Fighter G Gundam character

== See also ==
- Beardsley meteorite
