= Bansley =

Bansley is a surname. Notable people with the surname include:

- Charles Bansley (fl. 1548), English poet
- Heather Bansley (born 1987), Canadian beach volleyball player

== See also ==
- Barnsley (surname)
- Barsley
