= Beardslee =

Beardslee is an English surname, a variant spelling of Bardsley, a toponymic surname associated with the village of Bardsley in Lancashire, England.

Notable people with the name include:

- Bethany Beardslee (born 1925), American operatic soprano
- Donald Beardslee (1943–2005), American murderer
- Henry Curtis Beardslee (1865–1948), American mycologist
- Henry Curtis Beardslee Sr. (1807–1884), American physician and botanist
- Lester A. Beardslee (1836–1901), US Navy rear admiral
- Robert Beardslee (1868–1926), American politician
- William A. Beardslee (1916–2001), American theologian

== See also ==
- Bardsley (surname)
- Barnsley (surname)
- Barsley
- Beardsley (surname)
