= Hull City A.F.C. 1–1 Manchester United F.C. (1970) =

1970 football match in Hull, England

Hull City v Manchester United
- Event: 1970 Watney Cup
Hull City	Manchester United
1	1
- After extra time Manchester United won 4–3 on penalties
- Date: 5 August 1970
- Venue: Boothferry Park, Hull
- Referee: Jim Finney (Hereford)
- Attendance: 34,007

The 1970 Watney Cup semi-final between Hull City and Manchester United was held at Boothferry Park, Hull on 5 August 1970. It marked the first time that a professional football match in England was decided by a penalty shoot-out.

Manchester United won the match 4–3 on penalties, following a 1–1 draw.

== Background ==
The 1970 Watney Cup was the inaugural edition of the Watney Mann Invitation Cup, a short-lived invitational football tournament, held at the end of pre-season. The tournament featured eight invited teams, with two selected from each division of the Football League. Those chosen to participate were the top two highest scoring teams from each division who had not gained promotion nor earned a place in a European competition the previous season.

The competition was a straight knockout tournament, with games that ended level going to extra time. In accordance with new IFAB rules at the time, penalty shoot-outs were used to determine a winner if scores were still even after an additional 30 minutes of play. In the quarter-finals, the new shoot-out rule had yet to be enforced, with only one match even needing extra time. Fulham versus Derby County at Craven Cottage had seen the hosts take a quick 3–0 lead, prior to a second-half comeback from the Rams. They went a step further to complete their victory, scoring twice in the additional 30 minutes, which set up the competition's other semi-final, where they faced Sheffield United.

Hull City and Manchester United had both faced lower league opposition in their respective quarter-final matches. The Tigers had breezed past Peterborough United in theirs, with club legends Chris Chilton and Ken Wagstaff each recording braces as they won 4–0 at London Road. As for Wilf McGuinness' side, they overcame a tough Reading team at Elm Park, nearly being upset as they only managed a 3–2 victory over their Third Division opponents.

== Match ==
=== Summary ===
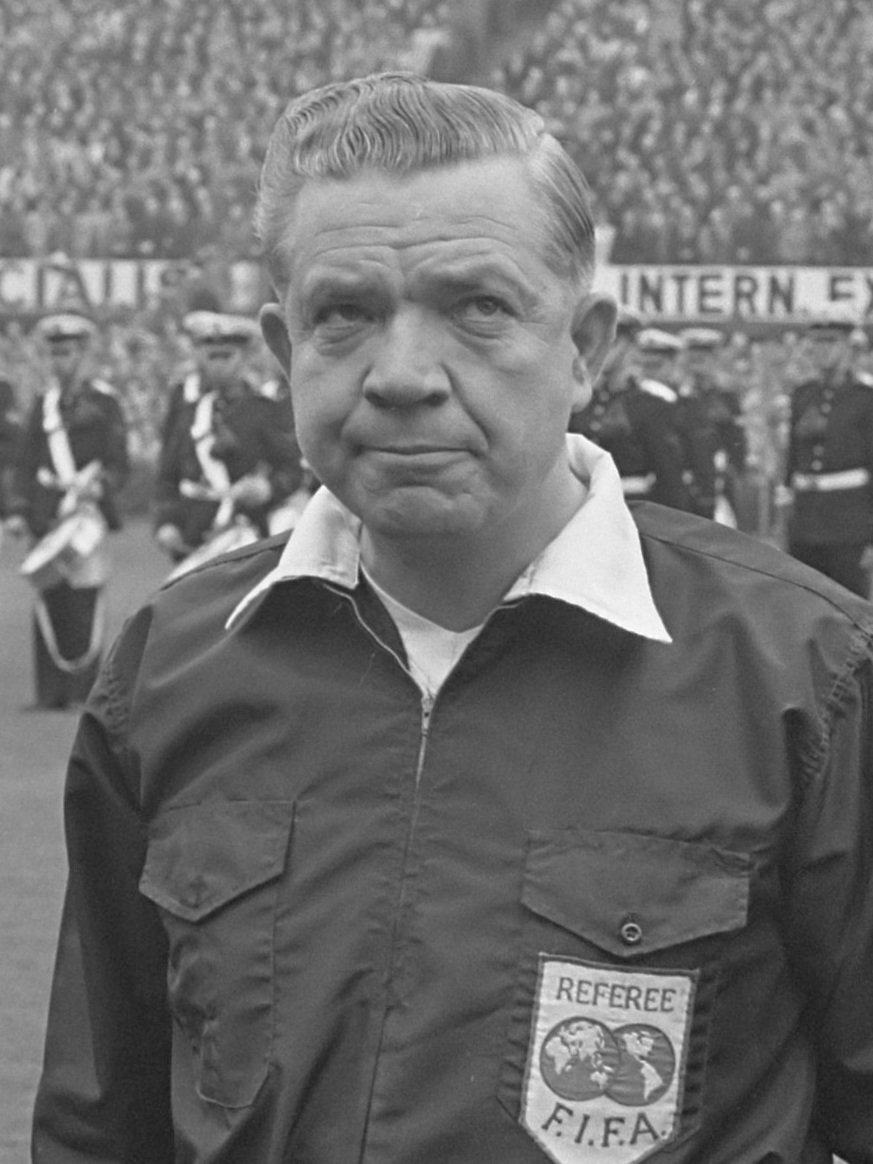
Referee Jim Finney officiated the match

Both teams decided to field unchanged sides after their wins in the quarter-finals. A crowd of just over 34,000 packed into Boothferry Park to witness Manchester United's first visit to Hull since 1949; a day on which the record attendance at the ground was set in an FA Cup sixth round tie. The hosts took advantage of their home support, with the Tigers' record club goalscorer Chris Chilton heading past Alex Stepney in the 11th-minute. It took more than an hour's play for United to find an equaliser. Denis Law eventually struck the visitors level with 12 minutes to go, sending the game to extra time.

After an additional 30 minutes of goalless action, history was made. It marked the first time that a professional football match in England was decided by a penalty shoot-out. United's talisman George Best became the first man to score a penalty in a shoot-out, before Hull's new player-manager and Best's fellow Northern Ireland international, Terry Neill, also found the net. Brian Kidd and Ian Butler both then converted, as did Bobby Charlton and Ken Houghton. Law, who had scored the goal to take the game to this point, saw his kick saved, in turn becoming the first man to miss in a shoot-out and seeing Hull goalkeeper Ian McKechnie become the first man to save a penalty in a shoot-out. The Tigers failed to take the lead when Ken Wagstaff missed, and were drawn back to 3–3 when Willie Morgan scored. Finally, McKechnie became the first goalkeeper to take a penalty, and also the first to miss, when the Scotsman blazed his kick against the crossbar, sealing United the historic win.

=== Details ===
5 August 1970
19:30 (BST)

Hull City	1–1 (a.e.t.)	Manchester United
Chilton 11'		Law 78'
Penalties
Neill (penalty scored); Butler (penalty scored); Houghton (penalty scored); Wagstaff (penalty missed); McKechnie (penalty missed)	3–4	Best (penalty scored); Kidd (penalty scored); Charlton (penalty scored); Law (penalty missed); Morgan (penalty scored)

Boothferry Park, Hull
Attendance: 34,007
Referee: Jim Finney (Hereford)

Hull City	Manchester United

GK	1	(Scotland) Ian McKechnie
RB	2	(Scotland) Don Beardsley
CB	4	(England) Billy Wilkinson
CB	5	(Northern Ireland) Terry Neill (c)
LB	3	(England) Roger DeVries
RM	7	(England) Malcolm Lord
CM	8	(England) Ken Houghton
CM	6	(England) Chris Simpkin
LM	11	(England) Ian Butler
CF	10	(England) Ken Wagstaff
CF	9	(England) Chris Chilton	Substituted off
Substitutes:
CF	12	(England) Stuart Pearson	Substituted on
Manager:
(Northern Ireland) Terry Neill (player-manager)

GK	1	(England) Alex Stepney
RB	2	(England) Paul Edwards
CB	5	(Scotland) Ian Ure
CB	6	(England) David Sadler
LB	3	(Republic of Ireland) Tony Dunne
RM	7	(Scotland) Willie Morgan
CM	4	(Scotland) Pat Crerand
CM	9	(England) Bobby Charlton (c)
LM	11	(Northern Ireland) George Best
CF	8	(Scotland) Denis Law
CF	10	(England) Brian Kidd
Manager:
(England) Wilf McGuinness

MATCH RULES

- 90 minutes.
- 30 minutes of extra-time if necessary.
- Penalty shoot-out if scores still level.
- Maximum of two substitutions.
