= John Beardsley =

John Beardsley may refer to

- John Beardsley (art historian)
- John Beardsley (cleric) (1732–1808), Canadian clergyman
- John Beardsley (colonel) (1816–1906), Union Army colonel
- John Beardsley (New York politician) (1783–1857), American politician
