= William Beardsley =

William Beardsley may refer to:

- William Beardsley (politician) (born 1942), American politician from Maine
- William Beardsley (settler) (1605–1661), one of the first settlers of Stratford, Connecticut
- William J. Beardsley (1872–1934), American architect
- William S. Beardsley (1901–1954), American politician
- William H. Beardsley (1850–1925), Arizona pioneer and irrigation engineer.

== See also ==
- William A. Beardslee (1916–2001), American theologian
