= 1975 Miami Toros season =

Miami Toros
1975 season
- General manager: Dr. Greg Myers
- Manager: Dr. Greg Myers
- Stadium: Miami Orange Bowl
- NASL: Eastern Division: Second place Semifinalist
- Top goalscorer: League: (Trinidad and Tobago) Steve David (23 goals); All: (Trinidad and Tobago) Steve David (23 goals)
- Average home league attendance: 4,921
Home colors	Away colors

The 1975 Miami Toros season was the third season of the team, and the club's ninth season in professional soccer. This year, the team finished in second place of the Eastern Division. They were a semifinalist in the North American Soccer League playoffs.

== Competitions ==
=== NASL regular season ===
W = Wins, L = Losses, GF = Goals For, GA = Goals Against, PT= point system

6 points for a win, 1 point for a shootout win, 0 points for a loss, 1 point for each regulation goal scored up to three per game.

Eastern Division	W	L	GF	GA	PT
Tampa Bay Rowdies	16	6	46	27	135
Miami Toros	14	8	47	30	123
Washington Diplomats	12	10	42	47	112
Philadelphia Atoms	10	12	33	42	90
Baltimore Comets	9	13	34	52	87

=== NASL Playoffs ===
==== Quarterfinals ====
August 13	Miami Toros	2–1 (OT)	Boston Minutemen	Nickerson Field • Att. 2,187

==== Semifinals ====
August 16	Miami Toros	0–3	Tampa Bay Rowdies	Tampa Stadium • Att. 22,710

==== Bracket ====
Quarter-finals
W1	Portland Timbers	2
W2	Seattle Sounders	1
C1	St. Louis Stars	1(5)
W3	Los Angeles Aztecs	1(4)
E2	Miami Toros	2
N1	Boston Minutemen	1
N2	Toronto Metros-Croatia	0
E1	Tampa Bay Rowdies	1

Semi-finals
W1	Portland Timbers	1
C1	St. Louis Stars	0
E2	Miami Toros	0
E1	Tampa Bay Rowdies	3

Soccer Bowl '75
W1	Portland Timbers	0
E1	Tampa Bay Rowdies	2

==== Match reports ====
August 12, 1975 Quarterfinals	Boston Minutemen	1–2 (OT)	Miami Toros	Boston, Massachusetts
	Melledew (68:03)	Report	Archibald; Proctor 98:47' (David)	Stadium: Nickerson Field; Attendance: 2,187

August 17, 1975 Semifinals	Tampa Bay Rowdies	3–0	Miami Toros	Tampa, Florida
	Smethurst; Boyle; Scullion	Report		Stadium: Tampa Stadium; Attendance: 22,710
