= Joseph Jankovic =

American neurologist

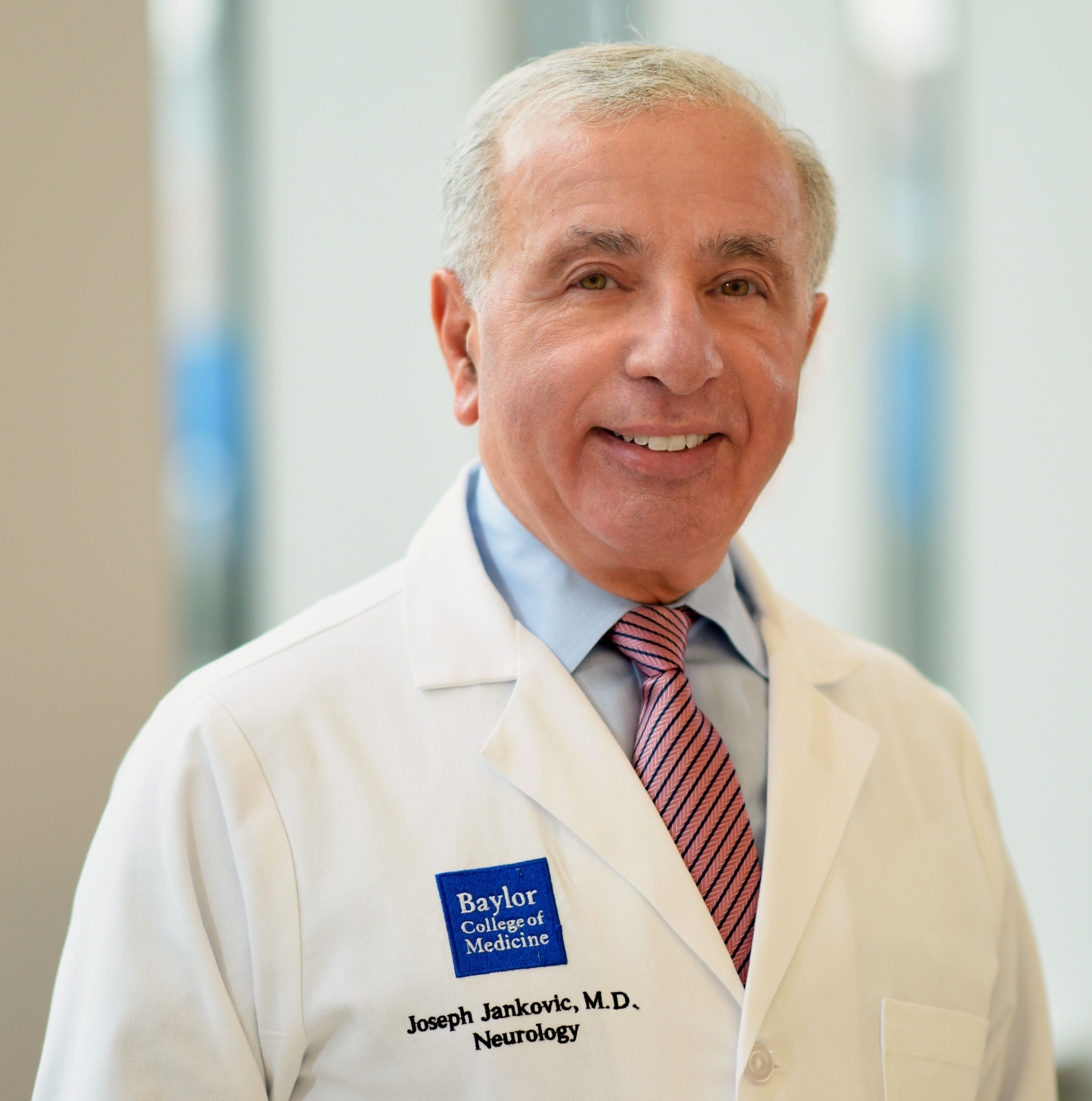
- Education: University of Arizona College of Medicine
- Scientific career
- Workplaces: Baylor College of Medicine

Joseph Jankovic is an American neurologist and professor at Baylor College of Medicine in Houston, Texas. He is the Distinguished Chair in Movement Disorders and founder and director of the Parkinson's Disease Center and Movement Disorders Clinic.

== Career ==
Jankovic received his M.D. from the University of Arizona College of Medicine in 1973. He completed his internship at Baylor College of Medicine and residency in neurology at Columbia University, where he was chief resident. He joined the faculty of Baylor College of Medicine in 1977 and was promoted to full professor in 1988. He currently holds the Distinguished Chair in Movement Disorders.

Jankovic has served as the principal investigator in numerous clinical trials. His research is in etiology, pathogenesis, and classification of various movement disorders and on experimental therapeutics. Jankovic has contributed to classifications, characterization, and therapeutic guidelines of various movement disorders. His research on drugs for parkinsonian disorders and hyperkinetic movement disorders, including botulinum toxin and tetrabenazine, has led to their approval by the United States Food and Drug Administration.

Jankovic is certified by the American Board of Psychiatry and Neurology. He has served on the editorial boards of several journals, including Neurology, Movement Disorders, Journal of Neurology Neurosurgery and Psychiatry, Parkinsonism and Related Disorders, Acta Neurologica Scandinavica, Journal of the Neurological Sciences, Medlink, Neurotherapeutics, Tremor and Other Hyperkinetic Movements, Journal of Parkinson’s Disease, Faculty of 1000, Toxins, Drugs, and Frontiers in Neurology. He is the editor-in-chief for Expert Review of Neurotherapeutics. He has served on the executive scientific advisory boards of the Michael J. Fox Foundation for Parkinson’s Research. He has published over 1,200 original articles and over 50 books, including several standard textbooks such as Neurology in Clinical Practice and Principles and Practice of Movement Disorders.

Under his leadership, the Parkinson's Disease Center and Movement Disorders Clinic has been recognized as a "Center of Excellence" by the Parkinson’s Foundation, the Huntington's Disease Society of America, the Tourette Association of America, and the Wilson Disease Association.

== Honors ==
- Past president of the International Parkinson and Movement Disorder Society
- Past president of the International Neurotoxin Association
- Honorary Member of the American Neurological Association, Australian Association of Neurologists, French Neurological Society, and the International Parkinson’s Disease and Movement Disorders Society
- Selected as “Great Teacher” by the National Institute of Health
- Fellow of the American Academy of Neurology
- American Academy of Neurology Movement Disorders Research Award
- First National Parkinson Foundation Distinguished Service Award
- Huntington’s Disease Society of America Guthrie Family Humanitarian Award
- Tourette Syndrome Association Lifetime Achievement Award
- Dystonia Medical Research Foundation Distinguished Service Award
- Texas Neurological Society Lifetime Achievement Award
- Baylor College of Medicine Alumni Association Distinguished Faculty Award
- Baylor College of Medicine Fulbright & Jaworski Faculty Excellence Award
- Baylor College of Medicine Master Clinician Lifetime Award
- Other recognitions: The Best Doctors in America, America’s Top Doctors, Listed in US News and World Report’s "Top Doctors", “Who’s Who in the World”
