= Veasey =

Veasey is a surname. It is derived from the Old French pre-7th century envoisier, "to enjoy oneself", the Latin vitium, "pleasure", and the Anglo-Norman French, enveisie, "playful, merry". Notable people with the surname include:

- Craig Veasey (born 1966), American football player
- Dale Veasey (born 1960), American wrestler
- E. Norman Veasey (born 1933), American judge from Delaware
- Josephine Veasey (1930–2022), British mezzo-soprano
- Marc Veasey (born 1971), American politician
- Millie Dunn Veasey (1918–2018), American veteran and activist
- Nick Veasey (born 1962), British photographer
- Pam Veasey (born 1962), American television writer, producer and director
- Sigrid Veasey, American physician and sleep researcher

== See also ==
- Feasey
