= Matthew Bell =

Matthew Bell is the name of:

- Matthew Bell (cricketer) (born 1977), New Zealand international cricketer
- Matthew Bell (footballer, born 1992), British Virgin Islands international footballer
- Matthew Bell (footballer, born 2002), Jamaican footballer
- Matthew Bell (rugby league) (born 1983), Australian professional rugby league player
- Matthew Bell (British politician) (1793–1871), British Member of Parliament
- Matthew Bell (Indiana politician) (born 1974), American politician from the state of Indiana
- Matthew Richard Bell (born 1990), British racing driver

== See also ==
- Mathew Bell (1769–1849), seigneur, businessman and political figure in Lower Canada
- Matt Bell (disambiguation)
