= Bardsley =

Bardsley may refer to:

== Places ==
- Bardsley, Greater Manchester, on the Oldham–Tameside boundary in England
- Frances Bardsley Academy for Girls in London, UK

== People ==
- Bardsley (surname), a list of people with the surname

== Fictional characters ==
- Frank Bardsley, from Coronation Street
