= Matt Bell =

Matt Bell may refer to:

- Matt Bell (author) (born 1980), American writer
- Matt Bell (American racing driver) (born 1985), American racing driver
- Matt Bell (British racing driver) (born 1989), British racing driver
- Matt Bell (television presenter) (born 1980), British television presenter, writer and comedian
- Matt Bell (footballer) (1897–1962), English footballer
- Matt Bell, acting mayor of Manawatū District

== See also ==
- Matthew Bell (disambiguation)
