= Richard Beardsley =

Richard Beardsley may refer to:

- Dick Beardsley, American long-distance runner
- Richard Beardsley (diplomat), US diplomat
