= Barnsley (disambiguation) =

Barnsley is a market town in South Yorkshire, England.

Barnsley may also refer to:

== Places ==
in England

- Metropolitan Borough of Barnsley, a local government district in South Yorkshire
- Barnsley (UK Parliament constituency), South Yorkshire
- Barnsley, Gloucestershire, a village
- Barnsley, Shropshire, a village
- Barnsley Manor, a manor house on the Isle of Wight

Elsewhere

- Barnsley, New South Wales, Australia
- Barnsley, Manitoba, Canada
- Barnsley, Kentucky, United States

== People ==
- Barnsley (surname)

== Science ==
Mathematics

- Barnsley fern, a fractal named after the British mathematician Michael Barnsley

== Other ==
in South Yorkshire, England

- Barnsley Building Society
- Barnsley Canal
- Barnsley F.C., a professional football club
- Barnsley (speedway), a speedway team
