= 1970 Watney Cup =

Inaugural edition of the Watney Cup

Watney Mann Invitation Cup

Tournament details
- Country: England; Wales
- Dates: 1–8 August
- Teams: 8

Final positions
- Champions: Derby County (1st title)
- Runners-up: Manchester United

Tournament statistics
- Matches played: 7
- Goals scored: 31 (4.43 per match)
- Attendance: 147,084 (21,012 per match)
- Top goal scorer(s): Chris Chilton; Alan Durban (3 goals each)

The 1970 Watney Cup was the inaugural edition of the Watney Mann Invitation Cup, a short-lived invitational association football tournament.

It was won by Derby County, who beat Manchester United in the final at the Baseball Ground.

== Background ==
The Watney Cup was introduced in 1970 to help increase the competitiveness of pre-season fixtures. Its name was a result of a sponsorship from brewing company Watney Combe & Reid. The tournament featured eight invited teams, with two selected from each division of the Football League. Those chosen to participate were the top two highest scoring teams from each division who had not gained promotion nor earned a place in a European competition the previous season.

== Format ==
The competition was a straight knockout tournament, with games that ended level going to extra time. In accordance with new IFAB rules at the time, penalty shoot-outs were used to determine a winner if scores were still even after an additional 30 minutes of play.

== Teams ==
First Division

- Derby County
- Manchester United

Second Division

- Hull City
- Sheffield United

Third Division

- Fulham
- Reading

Fourth Division

- Aldershot
- Peterborough United

== Tournament ==
=== Quarter-finals ===
1 August 1970

| Aldershot (4) | 0–6 | Sheffield United (2) |
|---|---|---|
| | Report | Currie; Addison; Woodward; Reece |

Recreation Ground, Aldershot
Attendance: 9,504
1 August 1970

| Fulham (3) | 3–5 (a.e.t.) | Derby County (1) |
|---|---|---|
| Earle 6'; Halom 11', 13' | Report | O'Hare 2'; Hector 23', 102'; Durban 69', 106' |

Craven Cottage, Fulham
Attendance: 18,501
1 August 1970

| Peterborough United (4) | 0–4 | Hull City (2) |
|---|---|---|
| | Report | Wagstaff; Chilton |

London Road Stadium, Peterborough
Attendance: 9,353
1 August 1970

| Reading (3) | 2–3 | Manchester United (1) |
|---|---|---|
| Habbin 15'; Cumming 57' | Report | Edwards 13'; Charlton 22', 44' |

Elm Park, Reading
Attendance: 18,348

=== Semi-finals ===
5 August 1970

| Derby County (1) | 1–0 | Sheffield United (2) |
|---|---|---|
| McGovern 29' | Report |

Baseball Ground, Derby
Attendance: 25,322
5 August 1970

| Hull City (2) | 1–1 (a.e.t.) | Manchester United (1) |
|---|---|---|
| Chilton 11' | Report | Law 78' |
Penalties
| Neill (penalty scored); Butler (penalty scored); Houghton (penalty scored); Wagstaff (penalty missed); McKechnie (penalty missed) | 3–4 | Best (penalty scored); Kidd (penalty scored); Charlton (penalty scored); Law (penalty missed); Morgan (penalty scored) |

Boothferry Park, Hull
Attendance: 34,007

=== Final ===
1970 Watney Cup final
- Event: 1970 Watney Cup
| Derby County | Manchester United |
| 4 | 1 |
- Date: 8 August 1970
- Venue: Baseball Ground, Derby
- Referee: Keith Walker (Maidstone)
- Attendance: 32,049

The 1970 Watney Cup final was held at the Baseball Ground in Derby on 8 August 1970 and had an attendance of 32,049. It was contested by Derby County and Manchester United. Derby won the match 4–1, with goals from Roy McFarland, Alan Hinton, Alan Durban, and Dave Mackay.

==== Match details ====
8 August 1970
15:00 (BST)

| Derby County | 4–1 | Manchester United |
|---|---|---|
| McFarland 20'; Hinton 24'; Durban 35'; Mackay 74' | | Best 32' |

Baseball Ground, Derby
Attendance: 32,049
Referee: Keith Walker (Maidstone)

| Derby County | Manchester United |

| GK | 1 | (England) Les Green |
| RB | 2 | (England) Ron Webster |
| CB | 5 | (England) Roy McFarland |
| CB | 6 | (Scotland) Dave Mackay (c) |
| LB | 3 | (England) John Robson |
| RM | 7 | (Scotland) John McGovern |
| CM | 4 | (Wales) Alan Durban |
| CM | 8 | (England) Willie Carlin |
| LM | 11 | (England) Alan Hinton |
| CF | 10 | (England) Kevin Hector |
| CF | 9 | (Scotland) John O'Hare |
Manager:
(England) Brian Clough

| GK | 1 | (England) Alex Stepney |
| RB | 2 | (England) Paul Edwards |
| CB | 5 | (Scotland) Ian Ure |
| CB | 6 | (England) David Sadler |
| LB | 3 | (Republic of Ireland) Tony Dunne |
| RM | 7 | (Scotland) Willie Morgan | (substituted off) 57' |
| CM | 4 | (Scotland) Pat Crerand |
| CM | 9 | (England) Bobby Charlton (c) |
| LM | 11 | (Northern Ireland) George Best |
| CF | 8 | (Scotland) Denis Law | (substituted off) 25' |
| CF | 10 | (England) Brian Kidd |
Substitutes:
| CM | 12 | (England) Nobby Stiles | (substituted on) 57' |
| CF | 14 | (Scotland) John Fitzpatrick | (substituted on) 25' |
Manager:
(England) Wilf McGuinness

MATCH RULES

- 90 minutes.
- 30 minutes of extra-time if necessary.
- Penalty shoot-out if scores still level.
- Maximum of two substitutions.

== Goalscorers ==
| Rank | Player | Club | Goals |
|---|---|---|---|
| 1 | (England) Chris Chilton | Hull City | 3 |
| 1 | (Wales) Alan Durban | Derby County | 3 |
| 2 | (England) Bobby Charlton | Manchester United | 2 |
| 2 | (England) Tony Currie | Sheffield United | 2 |
| 2 | (England) Vic Halom | Fulham | 2 |
| 2 | (England) Kevin Hector | Derby County | 2 |
| 2 | (England) Ken Wagstaff | Hull City | 2 |
| 2 | (England) Alan Woodward | Sheffield United | 2 |
| 3 | 13 players | Various | 1 |
