= Stuart Croft =

Stuart Croft may refer to:

- Stuart Croft (footballer) (born 1954), English professional footballer
- Stuart Croft (political scientist) (born 1963), British political scientist, Vice-Chancellor of the University of Warwick
- Stuart Croft (artist) (1970–2015), British artist and filmmaker
