= Steve Abbott (politician) =

American lawyer and politician (born 1962)

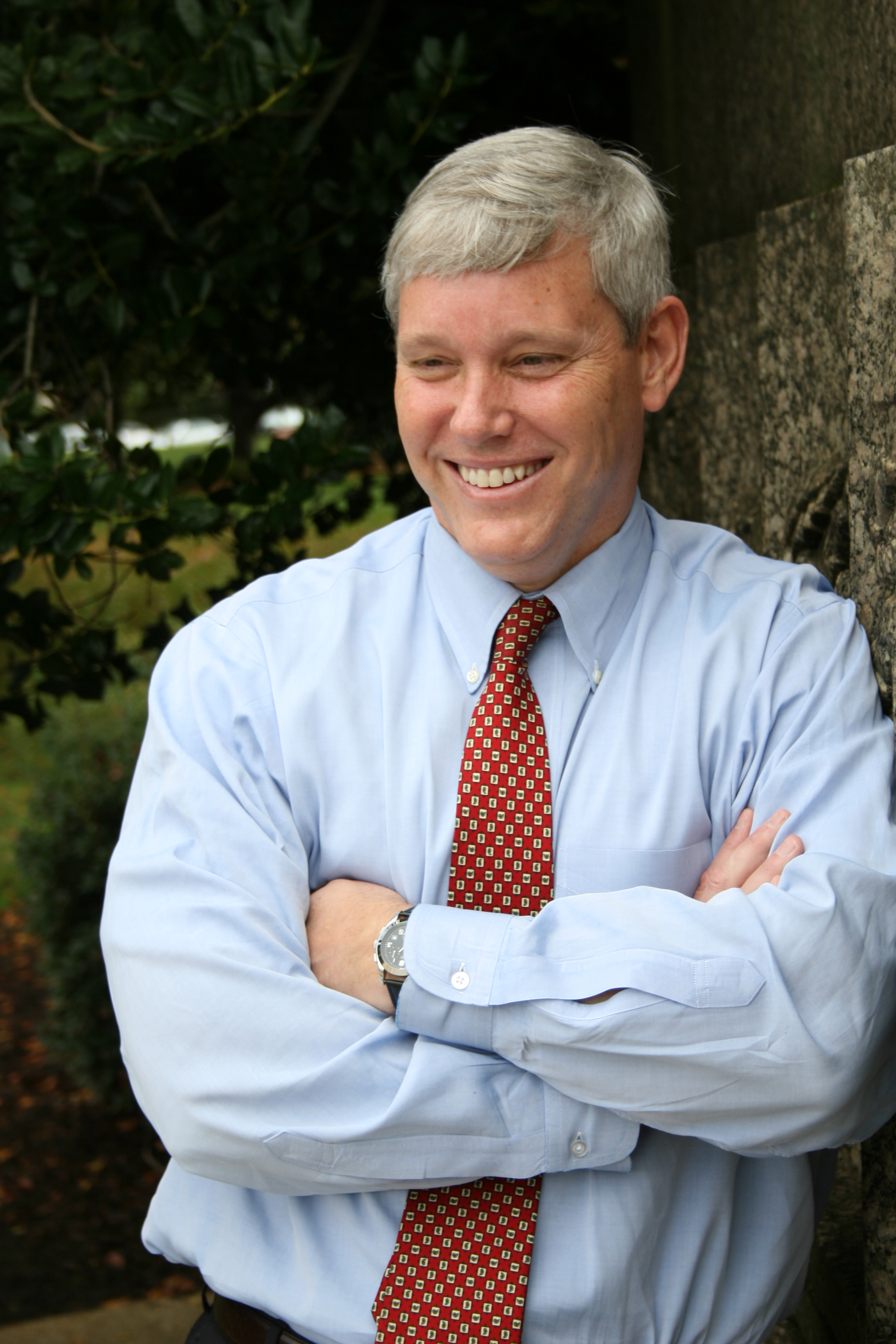
- Abbott in 2009

Personal details
- Born: Steven W. Abbott; August 16, 1962 (age 64)
- Party: Republican
- Spouse: Amy Abbott
- Education: Harvard University, University of Maine School of Law
- Occupation: Lawyer, Chief of Staff to Senator Susan Collins

Steven W. Abbott (born August 16, 1962) is an American lawyer and politician, most recently serving as the Chief of Staff to Senator Susan Collins. In January 2010, Abbott announced that he was seeking the 2010 Republican nomination for Governor of Maine. In the June primary, he came in fourth.

== Early life and education ==
Abbott grew up in Orono, Maine. His mother taught at a local Orono elementary school and his father, Walter, taught and coached at the University of Maine. After Steve was graduated by Orono High School in 1981, he went on to study at Harvard University, where he majored in history. From 1988 to 1991, Abbott studied law at the University of Maine School of Law.

Steve Abbott was recognized at both the high school and collegiate level for his athletic talent. At Orono High School, he played three sports and captained the state championship football and basketball teams. In 1981, he was named Maine's top high school scholar athlete. In addition to his personal accomplishments, his football team went undefeated during all his played seasons setting a state record for most consecutive wins. At Harvard, he played on two championship football teams before he was chosen to serve as Harvard's 111th football captain.

Abbott studied sport management at the University of Massachusetts Amherst before joining Sen. Collins' staff in 1997.

== Career ==
After passing the bar, Abbott practiced law at Pierce Atwood, Maine's largest commercial law firm, starting in 1991.

=== Early political career ===
Abbott got his start in politics in the 1980s, as a campaign volunteer for future governor John R. McKernan Jr. He then took a position on then-Congresswoman Olympia Snowe's Washington staff.

=== Chief of Staff to Senator Susan Collins ===
Abbott has worked for Collins since 1994, when she made an unsuccessful bid for Governor of Maine, eventually coming in third behind Independent Angus King and Democrat Joseph E. Brennan. He has served as campaign manager for all three of her senatorial campaigns, and has served as chief of staff since 1997.

=== 2010 campaign for Governor of Maine ===
Abbott's name was widely speculated on in 2009 as a potential candidate, both for a challenge to 1st District Congresswoman Chellie Pingree, and for the 2010 Republican nomination for Governor of Maine.

On January 12, 2010, Abbott made his candidacy for governor official, announcing his run at a series of events in Portland, Orono, and Presque Isle.

On June 2, 2010, the Portland Press Herald announced support of Abbott for the Republican nomination. The Press Herald also supported Patrick K. McGowan for the Democratic Party. On June 14, 2010, Abbott came in fourth place in the primary and McGowan also lost.

=== Interim athletic director, University of Maine ===
On August 20, 2010, Abbott was named interim athletic director for the university of Maine Black Bears. University president Robert Kennedy said Abbott's lack of experience in athletic administration was not an issue because of his extensive background in law and politics, as well as his roots in the university. "[C]ontinued fund-raising for the renovation of Memorial Gym and significant improvements at Alfond Arena" were also cited as priorities he could and would address in the job. Abbott's appointment was still subject to formal approval by University of Maine System Chancellor Richard Pattenaude and the board of trustees. As for the tenure of the new job, Abbott was quoted as saying, "I don't know what I'm going to do next, but I'm looking at it as an interim position. I'm not going to apply when they start the search [for a permanent director]." Abbott's salary was $140,000 and he started September 6.

On March 28, 2011, Abbott accepted a two-year deal to remain athletic director, starting June 1.

== Personal life and family ==
Abbott divides his time between Washington and Portland, where he lives with his wife, Amy, a former finance executive at Unum, and their daughter and son.
