= Feasey =

Feasey is a surname. Notable people with the surname include:

- Kirsty Feasey (born 1993), English-born Maltese footballer
- Paul Feasey (1933–2012), British footballer
- Willis Feasey (born 1992), New Zealand alpine ski racer

== See also ==
- Vaisey
- Veasey
