= Barnsley (surname) =

Origin
- Meaning: "Barn clearing" in Old English; one who came from Barnsley
- Region of origin: England

Barnsley is an English toponymic surname associated with one of the places so called, e.g. Barnsley in Yorkshire or Barnsley in Gloucestershire.

Notable people with the name include:

- Craig Barnsley (born 1983), South African-born Welsh cricketer
- Barnsley brothers, Ernest (1863–1926) and Sidney (1865–1916), Arts and Crafts movement master builders
- Edward Barnsley (1900–1987), designer and furniture maker, son of Sidney Barnsley
- Geoff Barnsley (born 1935), English former footballer
- Godfrey Barnsley (1805–1873), British-American businessman and cotton broker
- Grace Barnsley (1896–1975), English pottery decorator
- Harry Barnsley (1905–1969), British coxswain
- J. M. Barnsley (1861–1929), Canadian painter
- Michael Barnsley (born 1946), British mathematician
- Thomas Barnsley (1919–1992), British businessman
- Victoria Barnsley (born 1954), British businesswoman and entrepreneur

== See also ==
- Barnsley (disambiguation)
- Bardsley (surname)
- Barsley
