= Jeff Lee =

Jeff Lee may refer to:

- Jeff Lee (American football) (born 1955), former American football player
- Jeff Lee (footballer) (born 1945), former American football player
- Jeff Lee (swimmer) (born 1981), former swimmer
- Jeff Lee (video game artist) (born 1952), video game artist
