= Billy Wilkinson (English footballer) =

English footballer (born 1943)

Personal information
- Full name: William Wilkinson
- Date of birth: 24 March 1943
- Place of birth: Stockton-on-Tees, England
- Date of death: 18 July 1996 (aged 53)
- Place of death: Melbourne, Australia
- Positions: Inside forward; centre-back

Youth career
- Middlesbrough
- –1961: Stockton
- 1961–1963: Hull City

Senior career*
Years	Team	Apps	(Gls)
1962–1972	Hull City	223	(34)
1972–1974	Rotherham United	26	(0)
1974	Durban City		
1974–1975	Bridlington Town		
1975	Boston Minutemen	15	(0)
1975–1976	Bridlington Town		
1976	Tacoma Tides		
1976–1977	Southport	10	(0)
1977–1982	George Cross		
1983–1984	Bell Park		
1985	Keilor Austria		
- * Club domestic league appearances and goals

William "Billy" Wilkinson (24 March 1943 – 18 July 1996) was an English professional footballer who played as an inside forward and centre-back for a number of teams across England, the United States, and Australia. However, he is predominately remembered for his time with Hull City between 1961 and 1972.

== Career ==
=== Hull City ===
Wilkinson was born in Stockton-on-Tees on 24 March 1943. He was a well-renowned schoolboy footballer in his youth, and played for both Middlesbrough and Stockton at amateur level. He left the latter for Hull City in August 1961. Less than a year later, in May 1962, Wilkinson signed his first professional contract with the Tigers. He then scored on his professional debut away at Halifax Town on 15 April 1963. Despite his good start, Wilkinson suffered a recurring knee injury, which kept him out of the team for six months. He returned in October 1963, and formed a strong partnership with Ray Henderson on the right side of Hull's attack. Wilkinson remained a regular starter until November 1964, when Ken Wagstaff was signed. Wagstaff's arrival saw Wilkinson drop out of the starting line-up for the next two years, which included Hull's 1965–66 title-winning season. Wilkinson only made four appearances that campaign, meaning he had unfortunately not qualified for a winner's medal.

In the second half of the 1966–67 campaign, he began making deputising cameos by filling in for various injury-stricken teammates. This continued until the 1969–70 season, when Wilkinson transitioned into a centre-back during Cliff Britton's final weeks as manager. The following summer, Wilkinson was a part of the Hull side who played out the first professional penalty shoot-out in English football history on 5 August 1970. Appearances began to dwindle at Hull for Wilkinson, and he eventually left East Yorkshire for Rotherham United in November 1972. He was later granted a testimonial with Hull at the end of the 1972–73 season, in which the Tigers played West Ham United.

=== Later career ===
Wilkinson arrived at Rotherham for a £10,000 fee, but a back injury saw him rarely play prior to a move abroad with Durban City in May 1974. A short stint there was followed by brief spells with Bridlington Town either side of a small period with the Boston Minutemen in the North American Soccer League. Whilst at Boston, Wilkinson played alongside legendary Portuguese forwards Eusébio and António Simões. More time in the United States came in 1976 with the Tacoma Tides, although this was swiftly over. Wilkinson finished his career with more short stints. Firstly, back in England with Southport, before retiring in Australia with spells at George Cross, Bell Park, and Keilor Austria.

== Death ==
After his professional career came to an end, Wilkinson remained in Australia and began coaching. He later died of a heart attack on 18 July 1996 in Melbourne, aged 53. His ashes were returned to England and scattered across the Boothferry Park pitch.
