= Anne Bardsley =

New Zealand–American academic

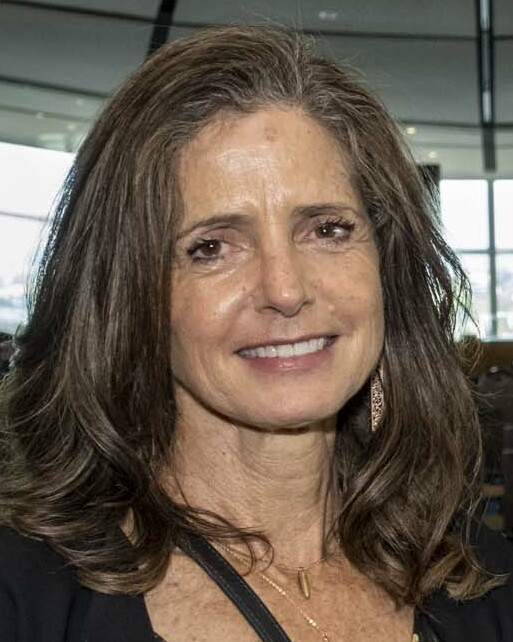
- Awards: Member of the New Zealand Order of Merit

Anne Bardsley is a New Zealand–American academic, and is a senior research fellow at the Centre for Informed Futures at the University of Auckland in New Zealand. In 2020 Bardsley was appointed a Member of the New Zealand Order of Merit for services to science and the state.

== Academic career ==
Bardsley completed a PhD in molecular biology and developmental genetics at the University of Colorado Boulder.

From 2012 until 2018, Bardsley was a senior analyst in the Office of the Prime Minister's Chief Science Advisor. During her period in that office, she was a researcher on the methamphetamine report and primary author on reports on the safety of water fluoridation and asbestos contamination following the Christchurch earthquake. She also researched and wrote the Conservation and Environmental Science Roadmap.

From 2016 to 2018, Bardsley served on the OECD Committee for science advice in emergencies.

== Honours and awards ==
In the 2020 New Year's Honours Bardsley was appointed a Member of the New Zealand Order of Merit for services to science and the state.

== Selected works ==
- Hanson, Mark Adrian; Bardsley, Anne; Luz Maria De-Regil; Sophie E Moore; Oken, Emily; Poston, Lucilla; Ronald C Ma; McAuliffe, Fionnuala M.; Maleta, Ken; Chittaranjan N Purandare; Chittaranjan S Yajnik; Hamid Rushwan; Jessica L Morris (2015). "The International Federation of Gynecology and Obstetrics (FIGO) recommendations on adolescent, preconception, and maternal nutrition: "Think Nutrition First"". International Journal of Gynecology & Obstetrics. 131 Suppl 4: S213-53. doi:10.1016/s0020-7292(15)30034-5. PMID 26433230. Wikidata Q46895355.
- S Nornes; M Clarkson; Mikkola, Ingvild; M Pedersen; Bardsley, Anne; J P Martinez; S Krauss; Johansen, Terje (1998). "Zebrafish contains two pax6 genes involved in eye development". Mechanisms of Development. 77 (2): 185–196. doi:10.1016/s0925-4773(98)00156-7. PMID 9831649. Wikidata Q34755291.
- Bardsley, Anne; McDonald K; Boswell RE (1993). "Distribution of tudor protein in the Drosophila embryo suggests separation of functions based on site of localization". Development. 119 (1): 207–219. PMID 8275857. Wikidata Q47072275.
- Bardsley, Anne; G L Plosker (2000). "Nelfinavir: an update on its use in HIV infection". Drugs. 59 (3): 581–620. doi:10.2165/00003495-200059030-00014. PMID 10776836. Wikidata Q33897234.
- Bardsley, Anne; S Noble (1999). "Oseltamivir". Drugs. 58 (5): 851-60; discussion 861-2. doi:10.2165/00003495-199958050-00007. PMID 10595865. Wikidata Q73267567.
- Gluckman, Peter David; Bardsley, Anne; Matthias Kaiser (2021). "Brokerage at the science–policy interface: from conceptual framework to practical guidance". Humanities and Social Sciences Communications. 8 (1). doi:10.1057/s41599-021-00756-3. Wikidata Q125869864.
- "Anne Bardsley: is there such a thing as a post-pandemic future? - The University of Auckland". www.auckland.ac.nz.
