= 9th New York Cavalry Regiment =

- Active: 1861 to 1865
- Country: United States
- Allegiance: Union
- Branch: Union Army
- Type: Cavalry
- Engagements: American Civil War

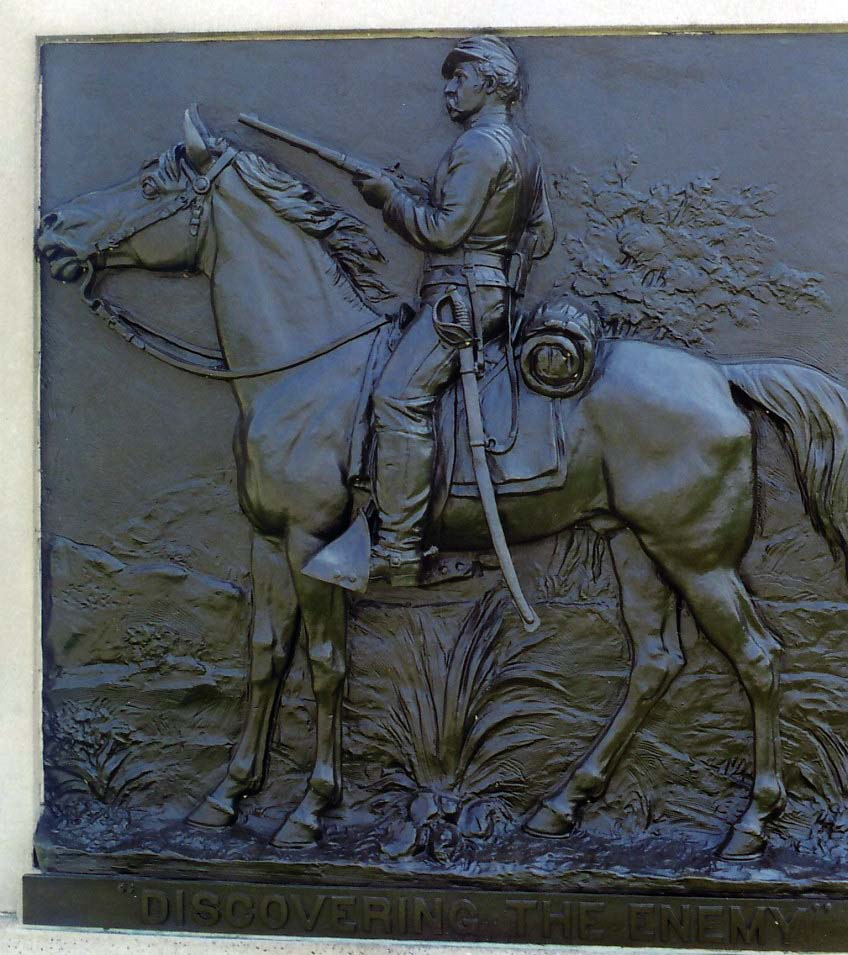
Relief at front of monument to the 9th New York Volunteer Cavalry at Gettysburg

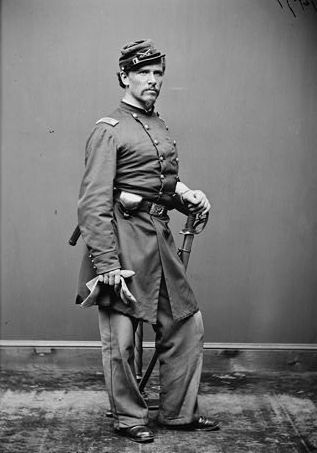
Lt. Col. William B. Hyde of the 9th New York Cavalry

The 9th New York Cavalry Regiment was a cavalry regiment that served in the Union Army during the American Civil War. It is also known as the Stoneman Cavalry, named after New York-born cavalry general George Stoneman.

== Service ==
The regiment was organized in Westfield, New York and was mustered out of service in July 1865.

== Commanding officers ==
- Colonel John Beardsley
- Colonel William H. Sackett
- Colonel George Sylvester Nichols

== See also ==
- List of New York Civil War regiments
