= Vaisey =

Vaisey is a surname. Notable people with the surname include:

- David Vaisey (1935–2025), English librarian and historian
- Harry Vaisey (1877–1965), English judge

== See also ==
- Vaisey, Sheriff of Nottingham, fictional character in the 2006 BBC television series Robin Hood
- Feasey
