= Bartholomew Crannell Beardsley =

Canadian politician (1775–1855)

Bartholomew Crannell Beardsley (October 21, 1775 – March 24, 1855) was a lawyer, judge and political figure in Upper Canada and New Brunswick.

He was born in Poughkeepsie, New York in 1775, the son of John Beardsley, chaplain in a loyalist regiment, and he came north with his family to New Brunswick after the American Revolution. He studied law there and was called to the bar in 1796. In 1797, he travelled to Newark (Niagara-on-the-Lake), where he set up practice. In 1814, he served as defense counsel for several prisoners at the Bloody Assize held at Ancaster. He was elected to the Legislative Assembly of Upper Canada in the 2nd and 3rd ridings of Lincoln in 1824; he was defeated in 1828 but reelected in 1830. He defended the rights of immigrants from the United States to hold full citizenship and opposed discrimination against religious minorities. He supported Robert Randal's case against Henry John Boulton. In 1832, he left Upper Canada to practice law in Woodstock, New Brunswick. He was appointed judge in the probate court for Carleton County there in 1834. He was elected to the Legislative Assembly of New Brunswick for Carleton in 1837. In 1847, he returned west and set up a practice in Oakville.

He died in Oakville in 1855.
