= Steve Deere =

English footballer (born 1948)

Personal information
- Full name: Stephen Herbert Deere
- Date of birth: 31 March 1948 (age 78)
- Place of birth: Burnham Market, England
- Position: Centre-half

Youth career
- 1964–1967: Norwich City

Senior career*
Years	Team	Apps	(Gls)
1964–1967	Norwich City		
1967–1973	Scunthorpe United		
1973–1976	Hull City	66	(2)
1975	→ Barnsley (loan)		
1975–1976	→ Stockport County (loan)		
1976	Bridlington Town		
1976–1978	Scarborough		
1978–1980	Scunthorpe United		
- * Club domestic league appearances and goals

Stephen Herbert Deere (born 31 March 1948) is an English former professional footballer who played as a defender for Norwich City, Scunthorpe United, Hull City, Barnsley, Stockport County, Bridlington Town, and Scarborough.

== Early life ==
Deere was born in Burnham Market, Norfolk.

== Career ==
Deere joined nearby Norwich City in the early 1960s, as an apprentice. At the time, the Canaries were managed by legendary ex-player Ron Ashman. Ashman would eventually leave the club in 1966, but upon taking charge of Scunthorpe United the following year, he signed Deere, now aged 19.

The young defender became a first team regular with the Iron throughout the late '60s and early '70s. In May 1973, he moved to Humber derby rivals Hull City, then in the Second Division. Tigers veteran Ken Houghton was also involved in the deal, moving in the opposite direction. On 8 December 1973, Deere scored his first goal for Hull at home to Crystal Palace as a part of a 3–0 win.

In 1975, he fell out of favour under manager John Kaye, and was sent out on loan, initially to Barnsley, and later to Stockport County. Deere eventually left Hull in March 1976, joining non-league Bridlington Town on a short-term contract. That summer he moved again, arriving at Scarborough. On 14 May 1977, Deere played the entirety of Scarborough's 2–1 victory over Dagenham in the FA Trophy final at Wembley Stadium. In the twilight of his career in 1978, he returned to Scunthorpe for two more years before retiring.

== Personal life ==
According to The Sunday Times in 2007, Deere became an executive with the Humberside Police after retiring.

== Honours ==
Hull City

- Watney Cup runner-up: 1973

Scarborough

- FA Trophy: 1976–77
- Northern Premier League Challenge Cup: 1976–77
