= Thomas Barnsley =

British businessman (1919–1992)

Thomas Edward Barnsley
- Born: 1 September 1919
- Died: 31 August 1992 (aged 72)
- Occupation: Businessman
- Known for: Managing director of Tube Investments, director of H.P. Bulmer Holdings
- Spouse: Margaret Gwyneth Llewellin
- Children: Thomas Barnsley (son), Victoria Barnsley (daughter)
- Parent(s): Alfred E. Barnsley, Ada F. Nightingale
- Awards: OBE (1975)

Thomas Edward Barnsley OBE FCA (1 September 1919 – 31 August 1992) was a British businessman. He was managing director, Tube Investments 1974–1982 and director, H.P. Bulmer Holdings, 1980–1987. He was the son of Alfred E. Barnsley and Ada F. Nightingale. He married Margaret Gwyneth Llewellin. They had one son, Thomas Barnsley, and a daughter, Victoria Barnsley. During the Second World War he was a member of the Friends' Ambulance Unit.

In July 1973, Barnsley was elected a Fellow of the Royal Society of Arts. Barnsley was appointed OBE in the 1975 New Year Honours list, at which point he was the chairman of the East Midlands regional industrial savings committee.
