= Sigrid Veasey =

American physician

Sigrid Veasey is a physician and scientist affiliated with the University of Pennsylvania. She specializes in medicine.

Veasey is a professor at the Perelman School of Medicine at the University of Pennsylvania and the Center for Sleep and Circadian Neurobiology where she conducts research on sleep disorders and sleep disruption.
