= John Bardsley (footballer) =

English footballer (1886–1971)

Personal information
- Full name: John Cannon Bardsley
- Date of birth: 6 May 1886
- Place of birth: Southport, England
- Date of death: 1971 (aged 84–85)
- Position: Left back

Senior career*
Years	Team	Apps	(Gls)
?-?	Northern Nomads	?	(?)
1909–1910	Everton	1	(0)
1911	Manchester City	0	(0)
1913	Wrexham	0	(0)
?-?	Chester City	?	(?)
- * Club domestic league appearances and goals

John Cannon Bardsley (6 May 1886 – 1971) was an English amateur footballer who made one appearance in the Football League for Everton as a left back.

== Personal life ==
Bardsley served as a private during the First World War, firstly in the South Lancashire Regiment and latterly at the 2nd Western General Hospital in Manchester with the Royal Army Medical Corps.

== Career statistics ==
Appearances and goals by club, season and competition
Club	Season	League			FA Cup		Total	
Club	Season	Division	Apps	Goals	Apps	Goals	Apps	Goals
Everton	1909–10	First Division	1	0	0	0	1	0
Career total			1	0	0	0	1	0
