= Charles Bansley =

English poet

Charles Bansley (fl. 1548) was an English satirist and poet. He is best known for his pamphlet, A treatyse, shewing and declaring the pryde and abuse of women now a dayes, also referred to simply as Pryde and Abuse of Women (1550).

Bansley clearly wrote in the time of Henry VIII and Edward VI, but the dates of his birth and death are unknown. He is remarkable for a rhyming satire on the love of dress in women, which concludes with a benediction on the latter monarch, and commences with the line

Bo pepe what have I spyed!

There can be no doubt of Bansley's religious opinions. Speaking in his poem of the feminine love for light raiment, he says—

From Rome, from Rome, thys carkered pryde,
From Rome it came doubtles:
Away for shame wyth soch filthy baggage,
As smels of papery and develyshnes!

He also complains very seriously that foolish mothers made ‘Roman monsters’ of their children. Perhaps, it has been said, he was an unworthy and therefore justly rejected suitor, and revenged himself by this attack on the sex. But the attack is not wholesale, as he expressly excepts right worthy, sad, and plain women who walk in godly wise. Indeed, the whole satire is mainly directed against extravagant attire. Ritson says it was printed about 1540, but he erred by at least ten years. The title of his work, as it appears in a reprint from a unique copy in the British Museum, edited by J. P. Collier in the year 1841, is as follows: ‘A Treatyse shewing and declaring the pryde and abuse of women now a dayes:’ black letter, London (without date), probably about 1540, 4to.
