= Ken Beardsley =

Australian rules footballer

Personal information
- Full name: Ken Beardsley
- Born: 3 November 1935
- Died: 11 August 2004 (aged 68)
- Original team: Mortlake
- Height: 175 cm (5 ft 9 in)
- Weight: 77 kg (170 lb)

Playing career^{1}
| Years | Club | Games (Goals) |
| 1955–56 | Geelong | 25 (15) |
- ^{1} Playing statistics correct to the end of 1956.

Ken Beardsley (3 November 1935 – 11 August 2004) was an Australian rules footballer who played with Geelong in the Victorian Football League (VFL).
