= Robert Beardsley =

American oceanographer (1942–2025)

Robert Cruce Beardsley (28 January 1942 - 16 December 2025) was an American oceanographer, focused on observational and numerical model studies of wind-, tidal-, and buoyancy-driven currents, mixing, and air-sea forcing on the continental shelf and marginal seas and on the impact of physical processes on biological processes and ecosystem dynamics. He was Scientist Emeritus at Woods Hole Oceanographic Institution.

He was an elected fellow of the American Association for the Advancement of Science.

He died on 16 December 2025, aged 83.
