= Frankie Banks =

English footballer (born 1945)

Personal information
- Full name: Francis Stanley Banks
- Date of birth: 21 August 1945 (age 81)
- Place of birth: Hull, England
- Position: Right-back

Youth career
- Southend United

Senior career*
Years	Team	Apps	(Gls)
1962–1966	Southend United	4	(0)
1966–1976	Hull City	288	(6)
1976–1979	Southend United	75	(0)
- Great Wakering Rovers
- Purfleet
Total		367	(6)

Managerial career
- 1990–1991: Purfleet
- Southend Manor
- * Club domestic league appearances and goals

Francis Stanley Banks (born 21 August 1945) is an English former footballer who played as a right-back.

== Club career ==
In 1962, Banks graduated from Southend United's academy to the first team, making four Football League appearances for the club before moving to hometown club Hull City in September 1966. At Hull, Bank made 288 league appearances, scoring six times, over the course of ten years before moving back to Southend in March 1976. In his second spell at Southend, Banks made 75 league appearances, helping the club to win the Fourth Division in the 1980–81 season.

Banks later played for south Essex-based clubs Great Wakering Rovers and Purfleet before retiring from playing.

== Coaching career ==
Following his playing career, Banks returned to Southend United, taking up roles as a coach, reserve and youth team manager. In 1990, Banks was offered the role of interim manager at Purfleet, after manager Harry Cripps suffered a stroke. Ahead of the 1990–91 season, Banks was offered the Purfleet job on a permanent basis. On 22 July 1991, Banks was appointed manager of Essex Senior League club Southend Manor.

== Honours ==
Hull City

- Watney Cup runner-up: 1973
