= Patrick K. McGowan =

American politician

Pat McGowan

Maine House of Representatives
- In office 1980–1990

Small Business Administration Regional Administrator
- In office 1993–2001

Personal details
- Born: Patrick K. McGowan Bangor, Maine, United States
- Party: Democratic
- Education: University of Maine at Farmington
- Website: mcgowanformaine.com

Patrick K. "Pat" McGowan is an American politician from Maine. McGowan, a Democrat, served in the Clinton administration as the New England regional administrator of the Small Business Administration. From 2003 to 2010, he served as Maine's Commissioner of Conservation. In 2010, he unsuccessfully sought the Democratic Party's nomination for Governor.

The Pittsfield, Maine native began his political career with his election in 1980 to the Maine House of Representatives where he served for ten years. In 1987, McGowan was co-sponsor of a bond which created the Land for Maine's Future program. He ran as the Democratic nominee for Maine's 2nd congressional district seat in 1990 and 1992. Both times, ran against incumbent Republican Olympia Snowe.

McGowan served as the Maine Commissioner of Conservation from 2003 to 2010. The Portland Press Herald endorsed McGowan for the Democratic Party's nomination for Governor. McGowan lost the primary to Libby Mitchell.
