= Roger DeVries =

English footballer (born 1950)

Personal information
- Date of birth: 25 October 1950 (age 76)
- Place of birth: Willerby, England
- Position: Left-back

Youth career
- 1967–1970: Hull City

Senior career*
| Years | Team | Apps | (Gls) |
| 1970–1980 | Hull City | 307 | (0) |
| 1980–1981 | Blackburn Rovers | | |
| 1981 | Scunthorpe United | | |
- * Club domestic league appearances and goals

Roger DeVries (Note: DeVries' surname is often written in different ways. Some of these include deVries, de Vries, and De Vries. However, most sources tend to write it as DeVries, hence its use in this article.) (born 25 October 1950) is an English former professional footballer who played primarily as a left-back for Hull City, Blackburn Rovers, and Scunthorpe United.

== Career ==
=== Hull City ===
DeVries was born in Willerby, in the East Riding of Yorkshire. He joined nearby Hull City in the mid-1960s as a schoolboy. He signed his first professional contract with the Tigers in September 1967. His debut came nearly three years later, in a 4–0 win over Peterborough United on 1 August 1970 in the Watney Cup. During his early years with Hull, he had to battle with Don Beardsley for the starting left-back spot. On 8 October 1973, DeVries scored his only goal for the club in a 3–3 draw away at Leicester City in the League Cup. He eventually racked up 362 appearances for Hull in all competitions, before leaving in the summer of 1980.

=== Later career ===
After leaving Hull, DeVries went to Blackburn Rovers. At the end of the 1980–81 season, he moved again. A short, month-long trial with Scunthorpe United followed, before retirement in November 1981.

== Retirement ==
DeVries became a primary school teacher upon retiring from football.

== Honours ==
- Watney Cup runner-up: 1973
