= Geoff Barnsley =

English footballer

Personal information
- Full name: Geoffrey Robert Barnsley
- Date of birth: 9 December 1935 (age 90)
- Place of birth: Bilston, England
- Position: Goalkeeper

Youth career
- 19xx–1952: West Bromwich Albion

Senior career*
Years	Team	Apps	(Gls)
1952–1957	West Bromwich Albion	1	(0)
1957–1961	Plymouth Argyle	131	(0)
1961 1962	Norwich City	8	(0)
1962–1964	Torquay United	6	(0)
–	Dudley Town		
- * Club domestic league appearances and goals

Geoffrey Robert Barnsley (born 9 December 1935) is an English former professional footballer who played in the Football League as a goalkeeper for West Bromwich Albion, Plymouth Argyle, Norwich City and Torquay United. He was born in Bilston.

Barnsley began his career as a junior at West Bromwich Albion, turning professional in December 1952, with his only league appearance for the Baggies coming in the 1954–55 season. In June 1957 he moved to Plymouth Argyle, playing 131 league games before moving to Norwich City for a fee of £2,000 in May 1961. Geoff played an instrumental part in Plymouth's Division Three title winning season of 1959, one of his only major honours as a player.

After only eight league games for Norwich, he returned to Devon, signing for Torquay United in December 1962 as understudy to Torquay goalkeeper Terry Adlington. Adlington was an ever-present in the 1962–63 season, Barnsley having to wait until September 1963 for his Torquay debut, a 1–0 victory at home to Rochdale. He made just six appearances for Torquay and subsequently left for non-league Dudley Town, before retiring as a player.

Today, Geoffrey lives in Sedgley, Wolverhampton.
