= Edwin Bardsley =

English footballer (1883–1916)

Personal information
- Full name: Edwin Bardsley
- Date of birth: 1883
- Place of birth: Hadfield, England
- Date of death: 18 November 1916 (aged 32–33)
- Place of death: Somme, France
- Position: Outside left

Senior career*
| Years | Team | Apps | (Gls) |
| 1903 | Glossop | 10 | (1) |
| 1904–1906 | Stockport County | 76 | (9) |
- * Club domestic league appearances and goals

Edwin Bardsley (1883 – 18 November 1916) was an English professional footballer who played in the Football League for Stockport County and Glossop as an outside left. His career was ended due to a broken leg suffered in a collision with William Foulke.

== Personal life ==
Bardsley served as a private in the Manchester Regiment during the First World War and was killed during the Battle of the Somme on 18 November 1916, while serving with the 2nd Battalion, Manchester Regiment. He is commemorated on the Thiepval Memorial.

== Career statistics ==
Appearances and goals by club, season and competition
| Club | Season | League | | | FA Cup | | Total | |
| Club | Season | Division | Apps | Goals | Apps | Goals | Apps | Goals |
|---|---|---|---|---|---|---|---|---|
| Stockport County | 1904–05 | Lancashire Combination | 33 | 6 | 5 | 1 | 38 | 7 |
| Stockport County | 1905–06 | Second Division | 36 | 2 | 1 | 1 | 37 | 3 |
| Stockport County | 1906–07 | Second Division | 7 | 1 | 0 | 0 | 7 | 1 |
| Career total | | | 76 | 9 | 6 | 2 | 82 | 11 |
