= Beardsley Creek =

Stream in New York State, USA

- Location within New York Location within the United States

Physical characteristics
- Source
  - coordinates: 43°15′20″N 78°13′58″W
- Mouth
  - coordinates: 43°21′07″N 78°10′16″W

Beardsley Creek is a stream in the U.S. state of New York. It is a tributary to Marsh Creek.

Beardsley Creek was named after Levi Beardsley, who settled the area in the 1820s.
