= Grace Barnsley =

English painter

- Born: Emily Grace Barnsley; 3 October 1896; Cirencester, Gloucestershire, England
- Died: 6 March 1975 (aged 78)
- Other names: Grace Davies
- Known for: Pottery
- Movement: Arts and Crafts
- Spouse: Oscar Davies

Emily Grace Davies (née Barnsley; 3 October 1896 – 6 March 1975), known as Grace Barnsley or Grace Davies, was an English pottery decorator.

Barnsley was born near Cirencester, Gloucestershire. Her father was the architect and furniture maker Sidney Barnsley and her younger brother was the designer Edward Barnsley. Grace learned how to paint pottery when she was a girl. She and her brother were educated at Bedales School and she then attended Birmingham School of Art Barnsley learned to decorate pots at Louise and Alfred Powell's pottery before becoming a freelance painter for Wedgwood.

In 1926 she married Oscar Davies, a merchant navy officer, and in 1934 they moved to Rainham, Kent. They opened a café, where they also sold pottery decorated by Grace.

In 1938 they took over the local Upchurch Pottery and renamed it the Roeginga Pottery. Roeginga was the Roman name for Rainham. They produced their own pottery which Grace continued to decorate. These businesses were closed at the outbreak of World War II in 1939 however, and Grace never painted commercially again.

There are samples of Grace Barnsley's work at the National Trust property, Stoneywell, Leicestershire.
