= Ian McKechnie =

Scottish footballer

Personal information
- Full name: Ian Hector McKechnie
- Date of birth: 4 October 1941
- Place of birth: Bellshill, North Lanarkshire, Scotland
- Date of death: 11 June 2015 (aged 73)
- Positions: Goalkeeper; outside left

Senior career*
Years	Team	Apps	(Gls)
1958–1964	Arsenal	23	(0)
1964–1966	Southend United	62	(0)
1966–1973	Hull City	255	(0)
1974	Boston Minutemen	15	(0)
- Goole Town
- Scarborough
Total		345	(0)

Managerial career
- 1979: Sligo Rovers
- * Club domestic league appearances and goals

Ian Hector McKechnie (4 October 1941 – 11 June 2015) was a Scottish footballer, who played as a goalkeeper.

Ian McKechnie was born at a maternity unit in Bellshill, North Lanarkshire but was raised in the village of Lenzie in Dunbartonshire and later in Chryston in Lanarkshire, near Glasgow. McKechnie signed for Arsenal in September 1958 after being invited to play for a Glasgow amateur side Letham Thistle (a Glasgow club with associations with the Arsenal scouting system). He was signed as an outside-left, but George Swindin, the then Arsenal manager, saw his potential as a goalkeeper. McKechnie went on to make 25 appearances between 1961 and 1964 for Arsenal.

He was the first Scot to be chosen to play for the London Youth XI, playing in the same team as Terry Venables. His first game in goal for Arsenal was a closed-door match against England prior to their Home International Championship campaign. He then played a friendly in Gothenburg against a Swedish Select XI in 1961, in which he pulled off a succession of acrobatic saves, and he was known henceforth as 'Yuri', after the first man in space, Yuri Gagarin.

McKechnie made his competitive debut against Blackburn Rovers on 14 October 1961 and went on to feature in some of Arsenal's major matches of the 1960s. These include the 1962 visit of Real Madrid to Highbury and he also played in goal against Rangers in the testimonial match for Jack Kelsey. The competition at Arsenal for the goalkeeping position was fierce, with not only Kelsey (before his retirement in 1962) but also Northern Irish international Jack McClelland, Jim Furnell and the young Bob Wilson. McKechnie played thirteen of Arsenal's first fifteen matches of 1963–64, but was dropped after Arsenal's first competitive match in Europe at Highbury, against Staevnet in the Inter-Cities Fairs Cup, on 22 October 1963, which Arsenal lost 3–2.

He never played for the Arsenal first team again, and was given a free transfer in March 1964. He joined Southend United two months later and made 62 appearances, before joining Hull City in August 1966 where he racked up 255 league appearances until the end of the 1973–74 season. During his stay at Hull the home fans would throw oranges onto the goalmouth as a gesture to the fact that he had been spotted eating an orange after training, many included contact telephone numbers and various messages of good luck. On one occasion a Tigers fan was arrested at Sheffield United's ground for throwing an orange to McKechnie; the Sheffield police were not aware of the ritual and McKechnie had to write to the court in defence of the arrested fan.

During his time at Hull, McKechnie was the first goalkeeper ever to save a penalty in a competitive penalty shootout, against Manchester United in the semi-finals of the Watney Cup in August 1970; he saved from Denis Law. He subsequently took the deciding kick to take the penalty shootout to further five kicks from each side, but his kick flew over the bar and put Hull City out of the competition. He therefore was the first goalkeeper to concede a kick in a shootout (to George Best), the first goalkeeper to save a kick in a shootout (from Denis Law), the first goalkeeper to take a kick in a shootout, and the first player to miss the deciding kick.

McKechnie then signed for the Boston Minutemen in the North American Soccer League in May 1974, where he was rated one of the top goalkeepers for that season. There was a suggestion of him signing for a season as a goal kicker for an American football team, but due to a strike this did not take place. Returning to England, he played for Goole Town and Scarborough, before retiring in 1977. Occasionally in friendly and testimonial games, McKechnie would play in the outside left position and indeed scored in such matches.

After retiring McKechnie had a spell in charge of Sligo Rovers in the Republic of Ireland. He lived in Brantingham near Brough and worked in Corporate Hospitality at the KC Stadium, the new home of Hull City, on matchdays.

McKechnie died on 11 June 2015.
