= Beardsley, Arizona =

- Populated place
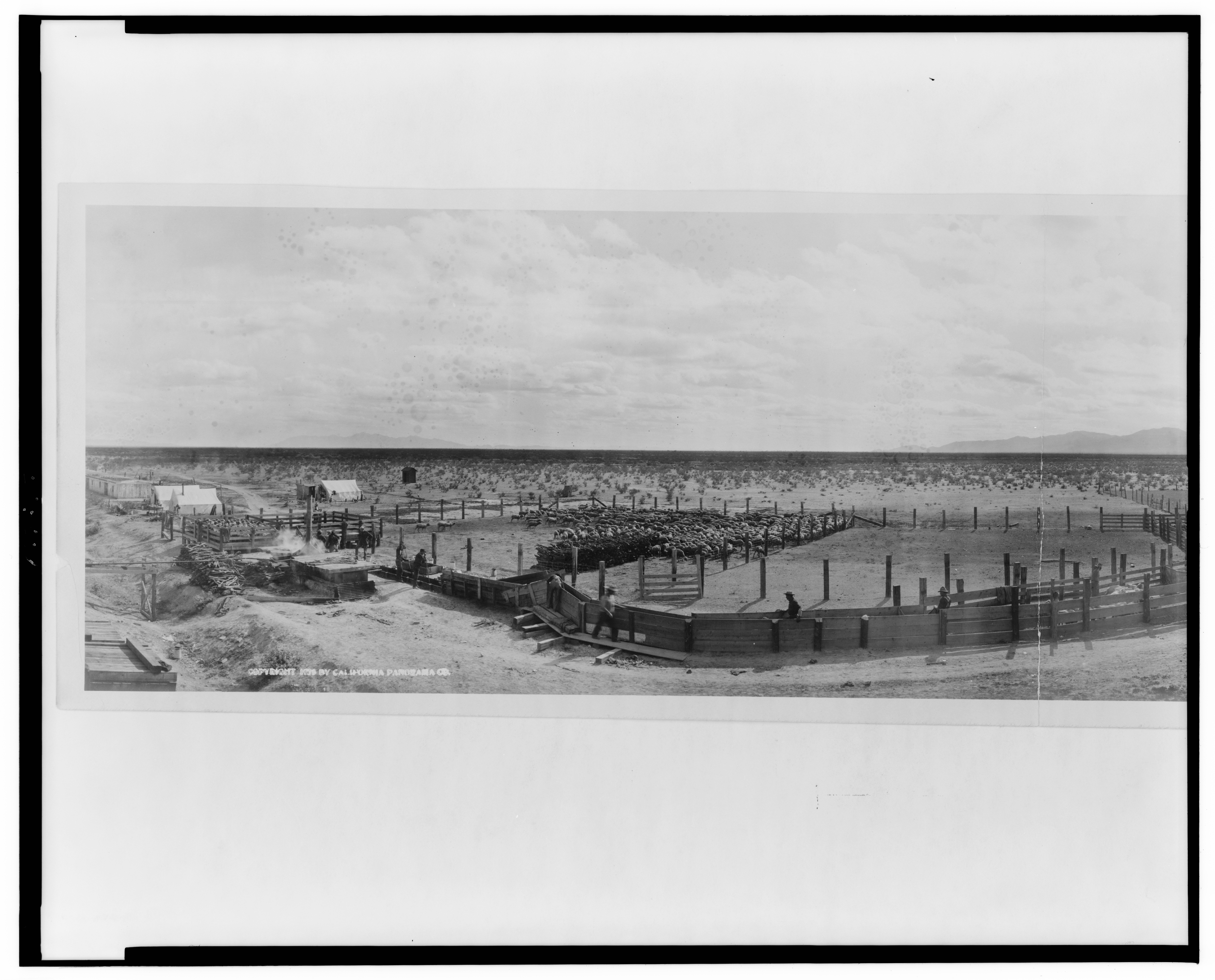
- Photo of Beardsley’s Sheep pens in 1908.

- Location of Beardsley in Arizona
- Coordinates: 33°39′41″N 112°22′45″W
- Country: United States
- State: Arizona
- County: Maricopa
- Elevation: 1,263 ft (385 m)
- Time zone: UTC-7 (Mountain (MST))
  - Summer (DST): UTC-7 (MST)
- Area code: 602
- FIPS code: 04-05420
- GNIS feature ID: 1154

Beardsley is a populated place situated within the Sun City West CDP in Maricopa County, Arizona, United States. It has an estimated elevation of 1,263 feet (385 m) above sea level, and was named for William H. Beardsley, an irrigation pioneer who began an irrigation project at this location in 1888.

== History ==
The town began in 1880 around a railroad station. Much of the town was bulldozed in the 1940s to make way for the railroad. For years it served as a sheep shearing point on the Santa Fe, Prescott & Phoenix Railroad.

Beardsley's population was 12 in the 1960 census.
