= Mick Bardsley =

Australian cricketer (1894–1983)

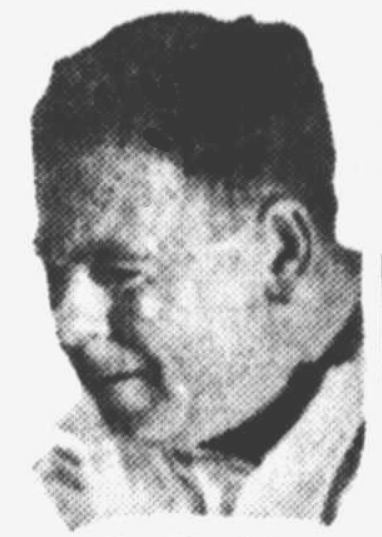

Personal information
- Full name: Raymond Bardsley
- Born: 19 January 1894; Sydney, Australia
- Died: 25 June 1983 (aged 89); Rose Bay, New South Wales, Australia
- Source: ESPNcricinfo, 22 December 2016

Mick Bardsley (19 January 1894 – 25 June 1983) was an Australian cricketer. He played eleven first-class matches for New South Wales between the 1920/21 season and the 1925/26 season.

== See also ==
- List of New South Wales representative cricketers
