= Chris Galvin (footballer) =

English footballer

Personal information
- Full name: Christopher Galvin
- Date of birth: 24 November 1951 (age 74)
- Place of birth: Huddersfield, West Riding of Yorkshire, England
- Height: 5 ft 10 in (1.78 m)
- Position: Midfielder

Youth career
- –1968: Leeds United

Senior career*
Years	Team	Apps	(Gls)
1968–1973	Leeds United	7	(0)
1973–1979	Hull City	143	(11)
1976–1977	→ York City (loan)	22	(6)
1979–1981	Stockport County	68	(3)
1981–1983	Tsuen Wan	36	(5)
Total		276	(25)

International career
1970	England youth		

Managerial career
- Tsuen Wan
- * Club domestic league appearances and goals

Christopher Galvin (born 24 November 1951) is an English former professional footballer who played as a midfielder in the Football League for Leeds United, Hull City, York City and Stockport County. He was capped by the England national youth team in 1970. And then, he transferred to Hong Kong club Tsuen Wan. before he retired. His brother Tony Galvin was also a professional footballer.

== Honours ==
Hull City

- Watney Cup runner-up: 1973
- Leeds United
- European Cup Winners Cup runner up 1972/73
