= Barnsley Manor =

- Former names: Benverdeslei
- Alternative names: Benveslei

General information
- Type: Manor house
- Location: Brading, United Kingdom

Barnsley Manor (also Benverdeslei, Benveslei, 11th century; Bernardesle, 13th century) is a manor house in the parish of Brading on the Isle of Wight.

== History ==
There are two entries in Domesday which may be identified with this holding, the one belonging to the king, the other to William's son of Azor. The latter, possibly the southern part now known as Hill Farm, was held under William's son of Azor by Roger. In 1203–4 Juliana the wife of John de Preston gave to the Prior of Christchurch Twyneham, in return for a corrody, a third of a carucate in Barnsley which she held as dower. The priory was in possession of a manor called Barnerdesligh at the Dissolution.

Besides this estate there seem to have been two others at Barnsley, one held by the Trenchards and the other by the lords of Whitefield. In 1263, Henry Trenchard granted to Elias de la Faleyse a carucate of land in Barnsley to hold by service of one-seventh of a knight's fee. Since the lords of Whitefield held their property under the Trenchards by the service of an eighth of a fee it is possible that Elias' holding passed to them, and with Whitefield came into the hands of the king, who was holding it in 1316. It appears to have become merged in Whitefield, and in 1589 William Oglander, farmer of Whitefield under the Crown, claimed Barnsley as included in his lease, but his claim was disallowed. Barnsley, with Whitefield (q.v.), was granted by Charles I to the citizens of London, and by them conveyed to Sir John Oglander in 1630, and still remains with the family, held in 1912 by Mr. J. H. Oglander.

Another estate in Barnsley was held by the Trenchards in demesne and seems to have passed with Shalfleet to the Brudenells. It may perhaps be identified with land in Barnsley sold in 1523 by Walter Dillington to William Lovell. The vill of Bembridge (Bynnebrigg, 14th century; Bichebrigge, 16th century; Bymbridge, 17th century) was held in 1316 by Robert Glamorgan, Peter D'Evercy, John de Weston and the heir of William Russell, and the suggestion by Sir John Oglander that the name arose as a general term for all the land lying east of the bridge connecting it with Brading may have some foundation in fact. It was divided at the beginning of the 16th century, like East Standen, between the Wintershill and Covert families, and a third of it was conveyed by Richard Covert to John Meux in 1548. From that time deeds relative to the manor are wanting, but it seems to have come in the reign of Elizabeth to the Worsley family and descended with Appuldurcombe till the middle of the 19th century, when it was sold to Sir Graham Eden Hamond, the grandfather of the owner in 1912, Sir Graham Eden William Graeme Hamond.
