= Cyril Bardsley (cyclist) =

English cyclist (1931–2020)

Personal information
- Born: 24 June 1931 Manchester, England
- Died: 6 February 2020 (aged 88) Stockport, Greater Manchester, England

Cycling career
- Sport: Cycling
- Discipline: Track cycling
- Role: Rider

Cyril Bardsley (1931–2020) was an English male track cyclist.

== Cycling career ==
Bardsley was born 24 June 1931 and was trained by his father Albert Bardsley, who was himself a useful track rider. He was an apprentice plumber from Blackley, Manchester and joined the Manchester Clarion club, which at that time included the international pursuit rider Cyril Cartwright as a member. Bardsley’s first track race was at Fallowfield on 10 April 1950, he was a long marker in the 600 yards handicap and came second. He also competed in the local Fallowfield track league.

At the British sprint championship at Herne Hill on 7 July 1951, the Daily Herald of 9 July 1951 described how Bardsley unexpectedly beat the champion Alan Bannister 2-1 with a fine display of tactical sprinting. Bardsley then competed in the 1951 Milan World amateur sprint championships on the famous Vigorelli track, riding a bike lent to him by Reg Harris. Bardsley crashed in the final 300 metres of the quarter finals, the event was re-run after ten minutes, but Bardsley was eliminated. Harris went on to win his third professional sprint title at the meeting.

After the world championships, Bardsley trained with Harris for several weeks and was described by the press as Harris’ protégé. In 1951, the NCU sent letters to all Olympic possibles requiring them to state that they were not contemplating turning professional. Bardsley refused to sign and the following month, he turned professional to ride with Reg Harris at Raleigh, whilst he was still just 20 years old.

Bardsley made his professional debut at Owlerton stadium on 24 May 1952, racing in a sprint omnium against Reg Harris, Arie van Vliet and Roy Pauwels. Harris and Bardsley then combined to beat the quarter and half mile standing start British tandem records at Fallowfield on 3 June 1952. In the summer of 1952, Harris and Bardsley appeared in a series of professional track omnium events around the country against Australian Syd Patterson and British professional road racers such as Dave Bedwell, Derek Buttle and Len Jackson.

Bardsley and Harris were both selected for the 1952 World professional sprint championships in Paris, but Bardsley was eliminated when his wheel buckled in a semi-final and a re-run was refused. The Swiss Oscar Plattner was crowned World professional sprint champion. Bardsley finished the 1952 season with a professional omnium race at Herne Hill’s meeting of Champions.

In December 1952, Bardsley went to Australia for four months so that he could race through the winter. He was kept busy with omnium racing against Syd Paterson, Jan Derksen and Australian champion Keith Reynolds.

Bardsley returned to England in April 1953 and rode with team mate Reg Harris at professional sprint meetings at the Grand Prix of Paris, Fallowfield and Herne Hill. Bardsley and Harris were again selected for the World sprint championships at Zurich and spent some time before the event appearing in exhibition matches in Northern Ireland. Harris made the world final, whilst Bardsley was knocked out in the quarter finals.

In June 1954, Bardsley raced in Denmark, then appeared at the Fallowfield Whit Monday meeting and Herne Hill for the Grand Prix of London sprint. Bardsley was unplaced at the Cologne World sprint championships, which was won for the fourth time by Reg Harris. The year was relatively disappointing for Bardsley, who did not make the progress expected of him.

Bardsley was conscripted into the RAF in 1955 but still managed some racing, he complained about a lack of training and following a very lean year, he retired from racing.

In 1959, Bardsley made a comeback for a couple of years, racing at Fallowfield in sprint events. After Bardsley retired, he opened a cycle shop in the 1950s called Bardsley Cycles at 482 Manchester Road, Heaton Chapel, Stockport SK4 5DL. He was involved with the South Manchester Racing Club, who used to meet at the Fallowfield clubhouse on Monday nights and the club trained on the Fallowfield track.

In the 1990s, Bardsley Cycles shop was taken over by ex-racing cyclist Will Wright and the shop changed its name to Will's Wheels. Bardsley died on 6 February 2020, aged 88.
