= Matthew Bell (Indiana politician) =

American politician

Member of the Indiana House of Representatives from the 83rd district
- In office May 25, 2005 – November 3, 2010
- Preceded by: Robert Kenneth Alderman
- Succeeded by: Kathy Heuer

Personal details
- Born: October 28, 1974 (age 51) Sarasota, Florida
- Party: Republican
- Spouse: Jackie
- Children: 2
- Education: University of Tennessee

Matthew P. Bell (born October 28, 1974) is an American politician from the state of Indiana. A member of the Republican Party, he previously served in the Indiana House of Representatives from 2005 to 2010. He represented Allen County, Noble County, Whitley County in the state legislature. In 2012, Bell was named President of Ivy Tech Corporate College. In 2013, Bell was named President of the Casino Association of Indiana. He previously served on the Indiana Gaming Commission from 2011 to 2014.
