= Victoria Barnsley =

British businesswoman and entrepreneur (born 1954)

Victoria Barnsley OBE
- Born: 4 March 1954 (age 72)
- Education: University College London; University of York
- Occupations: Businesswoman and entrepreneur
- Known for: Founder of the publishing house Fourth Estate
- Spouse(s): The Hon. Nicholas Howard, m. 1992
- Children: 1 daughter
- Parent(s): Thomas E. Barnsley, OBE, and Margaret Gwyneth Barnsley (née Llewellin)

Victoria Barnsley OBE (born 4 March 1954) is a British businesswoman and entrepreneur. In 1984, she co-founded the publishing house Fourth Estate after raising £80,000 from four backers via the Business Expansion Scheme, a scheme that provided investors with tax incentives. In 2000, the company was acquired by HarperCollins, a subsidiary of News Corporation, for a figure believed to be about £10.2m. As part of the deal, she joined the company and was later made CEO and Publisher of HarperCollins UK and International in 2008. She remained in this position until July 2013. While at HarperCollins, she helped to develop its digital and international content business.

Barnsley has held various high-profile industry roles, including President of the Publishers Association and Chair of World Book Day. She also represented the publishing sector on the Creative Industries Council. In addition to literature, Barnsley has an extensive interest in the visual arts and is a former trustee of both the Tate and the National Gallery. At the Tate, she chaired the Tate Britain Council and remains a trustee of the Tate Foundation and a director of Tate Enterprises Ltd.

Barnsley has a BA degree in English Literature from University College London (UCL) and an MA from the University of York. She was made a Fellow of UCL in 2005, and was appointed an OBE for services to publishing in the 2009 New Years Honours List.

Barnsley is the daughter of Thomas E. Barnsley, who was also appointed an OBE, and his wife Margaret Gwyneth Barnsley (née Llewellin). Since 1992, she has been married to The Hon. Nicholas Howard, son of the cross-bench life peer George Howard, Baron Howard of Henderskelfe. They have one daughter together.
