= Boston Minutemen =

- Full name: Boston Minutemen
- Founded: 1974
- Dissolved: 1976; 50 years ago
- Stadium: Alumni Stadium; Nickerson Field; Foxboro Stadium; Veterans Memorial Stadium; Sargent Field; McCoy Stadium
- Capacity: 30,000 (Alumni); 15,000 (Nickerson); 61,000 (Foxboro); N/A (Quincy); N/A (Sargent); 11,000 (McCoy)
- Chairman: John Sterge
- Manager: Hubert Vogelsinger
- League: NASL
| Home colors | Away colors |

The Boston Minutemen were an American professional soccer team based in Boston, Massachusetts that played in the North American Soccer League (NASL). They played from 1974 to 1976. Their home fields included Alumni Stadium in Chestnut Hill, Schaefer Stadium in Foxborough, Veterans Memorial Stadium in Quincy and Sargent Field in New Bedford.

Portuguese legend Eusébio played for the Minutemen in 1975, as did famed American player Shep Messing.

The Minutemen started well, winning the Northern Division title in their first season and drawing over 9000 fans a match to Alumni Stadium, good for 5th highest in the league. They lost in the playoffs to eventual league champion Los Angeles Aztecs. When Eusébio came to Boston in 1975, by which time the team had relocated to Nickerson Field, it seemed as though things would continue to look up. Though the team would win the Northern Division title again for the second time in as many seasons, attendance fell to around 4000 – half of what it had been. In the playoffs, the Minutemen lost to Miami in extra time.

For the 1976 season, team owner John Sterge announced the Minutemen would relocate again, this time to Harvard Stadium, but that deal collapsed before the start of the season and the team ended up playing in a hodge-podge of grounds throughout Massachusetts: Schaefer Stadium in Foxborough, Veterans Memorial Stadium in Quincy, and Sargent Field in New Bedford. By this time Sterge was having financial difficulties (which ended in action by the Securities and Exchange Commission) and was compelled to sell off many of his players, including Eusebio, who went to the eventual champions Toronto Metros-Croatia. Attendance plummeted, the Minutemen lost their last 12 matches and after the season, they folded.

== Media Coverage ==
Television was limited to a highlights show presented on WBZ-TV with Roger Twibell and Seamus Malin hosting. Eleven matches were broadcast on radio in 1975 on WCRB.

== Notable players ==
- (Saint Kitts and Nevis) Bert Bowery (1976)
- (Nigeria) Ade Coker (1975–76)
- (England) John Coyne (1974)
- (England) Geoff Davies (1975–76)
- (Portugal) Eusébio (1975)
- (England) Paddy Greenwood (1974 & 1976)
- (United States) Shep Messing (1975)
- (Scotland) Ian McKechnie (1974)
- (Portugal) António Simões (1975–76)
- (Germany) Wolfgang Sühnholz (1975–76)
- (England) Billy Wilkinson (1975)

== Year-by-year ==
| Year | League | W | L | T | Pts | Regular season | Playoffs | Avg. Attend. |
|---|---|---|---|---|---|---|---|---|
| 1974 | NASL | 10 | 9 | 1 | 94 | 1st, Northern Division | Won Quarterfinal (Baltimore); Lost Semifinal (Los Angeles) | 9,642 |
| 1975 | NASL indoor | 1 | 1 | — | 2 | 4th, Region 2 | Did not qualify | N/A |
| 1975 | NASL | 13 | 9 | — | 116 | 1st, Northern Division | Lost Quarterfinal (Miami) | 4,422 |
| 1976 | NASL indoor | 0 | 2 | — | 0 | 4th, East Regional | Did not qualify | N/A |
| 1976 | NASL | 7 | 17 | — | 72 | 5th, Atlantic Conference, Northern Division | Did not qualify | 2,581 |

== Honors ==
NASL Division Titles

- 1974: Northern Division
- 1975: Northern Division

NASL Leading Goalkeeper

- 1975: Shep Messing (0.93 goals against avg.)

All-Star Selections

- 1974: Ade Coker (second team)
- 1974: Paddy Greenwood (honorable mention)
- 1974: Ian McKechnie (honorable mention)
- 1975: António Simões (first team)
- 1975: Wolfgang Sühnholz (honorable mention)
- 1976: Shep Messing (indoor All-Regional)

Indoor Soccer Hall of Fame members

- 2019: Shep Messing

== See also ==
- Boston Rovers
- Boston Beacons
- New England Tea Men
