= Hezekiah Beardsley =

American physician (1748–1790)

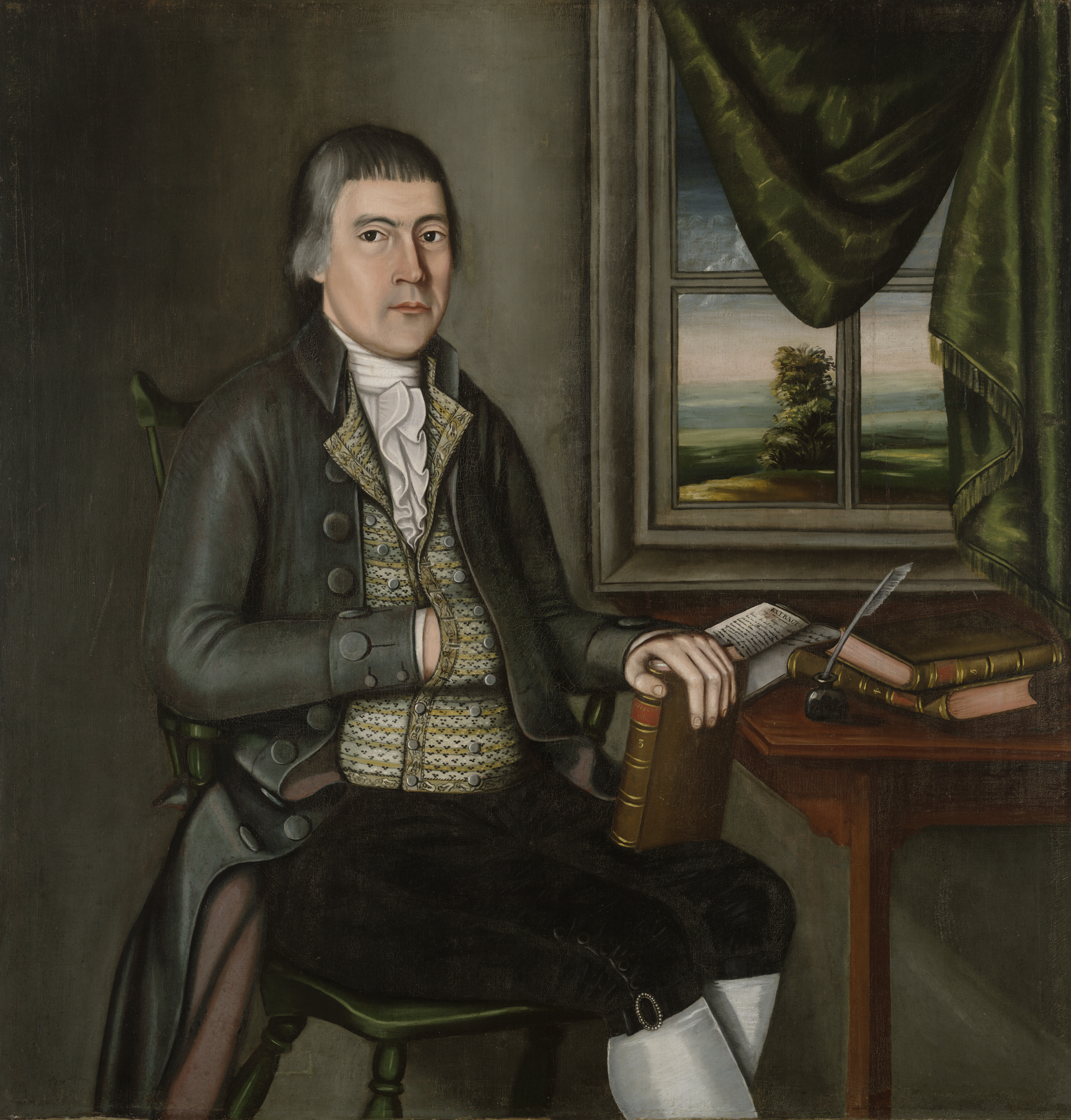
- portrait by the Beardsley Limner
- Born: 1748; Stratford
- Died: May 10, 1790; New Haven
- Occupation: Medical doctor
- Spouse: Elizabeth Davis Beardsley

Hezekiah Beardsley (1748–1790) was an American physician, the first to describe congenital hypertrophic stenosis of the pylorus in infants.

The known facts of his life are scanty. He was born in Stratford, Connecticut, in 1748, and became a druggist and physician, and practised in Southington, Connecticut, as early as 1778, so far as health would permit. Two years later he appears to have removed to Hartford. An advertisement of his firm, "Beardsley and Hopkins," is to be found in the Connecticut Courant for June 26, 1781. In it we learn his drug store was situated "a few rods east of the Court House." In 1782 he removed to New Haven, where he had a similar store on Chapel street, between Church and Orange streets. At the time of his death, in 1790, from consumption, he had taken his brother-in-law into partnership with him.

He was one of the original members of the New Haven County Medical Association, and served on the committees of correspondence and examination. In April, 1788, he reported a case of "scirrhus in the pylorus of an infant," which was the first case on record of congenital hypertrophy of the pylorus in an infant. It was printed with the papers of the society, which appeared in their transactions entitled: "Cases and Observations." In this paper Beardsley noted practically every feature of the disease we now know. He had attended the patient for three years at Southington, and when her death, at the age of five years, "closed the painful melancholy scene" he performed the autopsy. He speaks of the "constant puking," which was first noted during the first week of life. Everything in the shape of food, the child took was almost instantaneously rejected and very little changed. The feces were small in quantity. He comments upon the leanness and wizened old look of the child, and states he had "pronounced a scirrhosity in the pylorus months before the child's death," although he first attributed the condition to a deficiency of bile and gastric juices joined with a morbid relaxation of the stomach. Unfortunately, Beardsley did not know of the child's death "until the second day after it took place. This late period, the almost intolerable stench, and the impatience of the people who had collected for the funeral, prevented so thorough an examination of the body as might otherwise have been made." At the autopsy Beardsley noted that the stomach was unusually large and distended. "The pylorus was invested with a hard compact substance or scirrhosity, which so completely obstructed the passage into the duodenum as to admit with the greatest difficulty the finest fluid."

== Sources ==
- Steiner, W.R. "Beardsley, Hezekiah" . In Kelly, Howard A.; Burrage, Walter L. (eds.). American Medical Biographies . Baltimore: The Norman, Remington Company. p. 82.
