= Beardsley meteorite =

Meteorite found in the United States

- Type: Chondrite
- Class: Ordinary chondrite
- Group: H5
- Country: United States
- Region: Kansas
- Coordinates: 39°48′N 101°12′W
- Fall date: 1929-10-15
- TKW: 16 kilograms (35 lb)

The Beardsley meteorite is a meteorite that fell in Beardsley, Kansas, on October 15, 1929. Three samples were preserved, one collected the following day, at Michigan State University, and two collected two years later, at the Smithsonian Institution and Arizona State University.

It is a chondritic type, but the samples showed unusual radionuclide profiles when analyzed in 1962: the Michigan State University sample was unusually high in potassium (higher than any other chondrite), rubidium (higher than any other meteorite), and caesium, while the Smithsonian Institution sample uniquely contained measurable amounts of Radium-226 and its decay products, suggesting contamination. Its age has been estimated at 4.64 billion years.

== See also ==
- Glossary of meteoritics
- Meteorite falls
