= John Beardsley (colonel) =

American Colonel

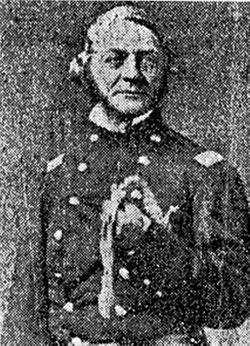
- Born: October 12, 1816; Fairfield, New York, U.S.
- Died: February 18, 1906 (aged 89); Athens, New York, U.S.
- Burial place: Athens Rural Cemetery, Athens, New York, United States
- Alma mater: United States Military Academy
- Military career
- Allegiance: United States (Union)
- Branch: United States Army (Union Army)
- Service years: 1841–1853; 1861–1863
- Rank: Colonel
- Unit: 8th Infantry Regiment
- Commands: 9th New York Cavalry Regiment
- Conflicts: Second Seminole War; Mexican–American War; Texas Campaign; Battle of Palo Alto; Battle of Resaca de la Palma; Mexico City Campaign; Siege of Veracruz; Battle of Cerro Gordo; Battle of Churubusco; Battle of Molino del Rey (WIA); American Civil War; Northern Virginia campaign; Second Battle of Bull Run

John Beardsley (1816-1906) was an American colonel who commanded the 9th New York Cavalry Regiment during the American Civil War and also commanded the Cavalry Brigade of the I Corps of the Army of Virginia before resigning after a series of controversies during his military career.

== Biography ==
=== Early life ===
John was born on October 12, 1816, at Fairfield, New York as the son of Levi Beardsley and Nancy Nichols. Beardsley then enrolled in the United States Military Academy in 1837 before graduating in the class of 1841. (Note: Sources differ as to whether he graduated 17th in his class or 36th.)

After graduation, Beardsley served in the 8th Infantry Regiment and served in the Second Seminole War before also serving in the Mexican–American War. During the Mexican–American War, Beardsley would initially participate at the Battle of Palo Alto and the Battle of Resaca de la Palma and was promoted to first lieutenant on June 18. He would later participate at the Siege of Veracruz and the Battle of Cerro Gordo, Beardsley then fought in the battles of Churubusco and the Battle of Molino del Rey, fighting alongside James Longstreet but he was severely wounded during the latter but was brevetted to captain for his service during the battle. Despite still remaining in service, it took a year for Beardsley to recover from his wounds and wouldn't return to active service until 1849 but due to visual impairments and his wounds, he resigned on December 31, 1853. Beardsley then moved to Athens, New York and was a farmer there with his wife, Mary Eliza Coffin who he had married on July 7, 1841.

=== American Civil War ===
When the American Civil War broke out, Beardsley received permission from Edwin D. Morgan to muster the 9th New York Cavalry Regiment at Westfield, New York as colonel with his commission dating back to November 21, 1861, as the regiment was completed at Albany. The 9th New York had a troubled start as the 9th New York wouldn't receive any mounts until Spring 1862. There were several proposals to disband the regiment but the 9th New York was instead used to help out artillery and infantry until the 9th New York rebelled and refused to serve with the artillery or infantry and George B. McClellan ordered the unit to be mustered out of service in May 1862 but when they arrived at Washington, D.C., they received mounts and were assigned to John Pope's Army of Virginia.

Beardsley made the commander of the Cavalry Brigade of the I Corps on June 26, 1862. The Cavalry Brigade then captured Waterloo Bridge near Warrenton, Virginia on August 25, 1862, during the Second Battle of Bull Run. He was then ordered to face his former comrade, James Longstreet's massive counterattack on August 30 and Beardsley ordered his men to form a column east of Henry House Hill to cover the retreating Army of Virginia before the 9th New York also retreated.

After the defeat at the Second Battle of Bull Run, Beardsley and his brigade went to Washington, D.C. where they served in managing the capitals defenses during the Maryland campaign and later rejoined the Army of the Potomac. Around late 1862, Beardsley was commander of the Convalescent Camp of the Cavalry Brigade where he remained until late February 1863.

=== Charges ===
On March 10, 1863, Major Charles McLean Knox of the 9th New York filed a complaint on Colonel Beardsley, preferring a court-martial charge for disloyalty, cowardice and for not being qualified for being neither a gentleman nor an officer from a series of incidents from August 6 to November 4, 1862. The disloyalty charges were brought on because Beardsley allegedly stated, "We have no government we are fighting for—no government; Congress is a mean, abolition faction; The Constitution is broken–we have no Constitution; The abolitionists on the North brought on this war; the Republicans are abolitionists."

Another controversy Beardsley brought on was that on September 12, when he learnt that Robert E. Lee was inviting conservative members of the Union to secede to the Confederacy, Beardsley reportedly stated, "I would rather fight under Lee than under an Abolition leader."

His cowardice charges were brought on when Beardsley allegedly left his post while the 9th New York were having a skirmish along with Beardsley immediately retreating as soon as he encountered enemy resistance on November 4 during the XI Corps march to Centreville, Virginia despite the 40 men being able to repel the Confederate attack. His most serious charge however came during the Second Battle of Bull Run as during the battle, Beardsley publicly berated Colonel William H. Sackett who had taken over as commander of the 9th New York and when Sackett tried to form his own columns, Beardsley kept interrupting his depositions, stating, "[W]hat the hell are you doing with my Regiment there— bring it around here— bring it here, I tell you—by file, march—trot—march– by God, you do not know how to handle a regiment— I will put someone in command of it that does form a line."

Knox also stated that Beardsley retreated to the rear, leaving the 9th New York under fire without any orders while Sackett kept his position before retreating across the battlefield where he found Beardsley and requests for orders to which Beardsley gave contradictory orders to try to cover a retreating artillery before abandoning the 9th New York for Centreville. The nail in the coffin was that Beardsley ordered Sackett to be arrested on September 8 while he was drunk and berated Sackett so much that it was described as being "an abusive and an ungently matter." These claims were backed up by Lt. Col. Charles Wetschky of the 1st Maryland Cavalry Regiment stated on August 30, his command was ordered to stop stragglers until Colonel Beardsley then ordered the 1st Maryland to form a line of battle on the right of the retreating column. Lt. Col. Wetschky stated that the line was promptly shelled by artillery, causing Beardsley to pull the line back behind a hill and then ordered the 1st Maryland to remain in place with Wetschky reporting that "The regiment was left without orders until the bridge over Bull Run had been nearly destroyed, when the officer in charge of the party who were ordered to destroy [the bridge] sent a message for the cavalry to come up in great haste – that he had just discovered that they were still in the rear."

Colonel William Lloyd of the 6th Ohio Cavalry Regiment stated that Beardsley ordered the 6th Ohio to stop straggling infantry, and then being shelled by artillery while in position. Lloyd then stated, "[W]e were shortly thereafter ordered to withdraw, and with the brigade, conducted by Colonel Beardsley, we moved on toward Centerville with the then retreating army."

When Alfred Pleasonton received the complaint, he forwarded the charges to the Cavalry Corps HQ demanding that Beardsley be removed as he was not fit to command, but before he could be discharged, Beardsley resigned from all posts on March 14, with his resignation being speedily accepted two days later, with it being officially recognized on April 8.

=== Later years ===
Beardsley's actual reasons for resigning were initially covered up before being fully documented as Beardsley returned to Athens to be a farmer and as a trust agent. He died on February 18, 1906, and was buried in Athens Rural Cemetery.
