= Stuart Croft (footballer) =

English footballer

Personal information
- Full name: Stuart Dunbar Croft
- Date of birth: 12 April 1954 (age 72)
- Place of birth: Ashington, Northumberland, England
- Height: 5 ft 11 in (1.80 m)
- Position: Defender

Youth career
- –1972: Hull City

Senior career*
Years	Team	Apps	(Gls)
1972–1981	Hull City	190	(4)
1981	Portsmouth	6	(1)
1981	York City	14	(0)
1981–	Bridlington Trinity		
Total		210	(5)
- * Club domestic league appearances and goals

Stuart Dunbar Croft (born 12 April 1954) is an English former professional footballer who played as a defender in the Football League for Hull City, Portsmouth and York City and in non-League football for Bridlington Trinity.
