= Matt Bell (footballer) =

English footballer

Personal information
- Full name: Matthew Bell
- Date of birth: 8 July 1897
- Place of birth: West Hartlepool, England
- Date of death: January 1962 (aged 64)
- Place of death: Kingston upon Hull, England
- Height: 5 ft 10 in (1.78 m)
- Position: Full back

Senior career*
Years	Team	Apps	(Gls)
1914–1918	East Yorkshire Regiment		
1918–1919	West Hartlepool		
1919–1931	Hull City	393	(1)
1931–1934	Nottingham Forest	85	(1)
Total		478	(2)
- * Club domestic league appearances and goals

Matthew Bell (8 July 1897 – 1962) was an English footballer who played in the Football League for Hull City and Nottingham Forest.
