= William Beardsley (politician) =

American politician from Maine (born 1942)

William Beardsley (born July 4, 1942) is an American politician from Maine. A resident of Ellsworth, Maine, Beardsley served as the Commissioner of Conservation in the cabinet of Maine Governor Paul LePage from 2011 to August 2012 after serving from 1987 to 2009 as the president/CEO of Husson University in Bangor, Maine.

He ran in the Maine Republican Party's primary for governor in 2010, finishing 5th of 7 candidates behind eventual general election winner Paul LePage. He was appointed by LePage in early 2011 to be Commissioner of Conservation.

As conservation commissioner, Beardsley sought to reform the Maine Land Use Regulation Commission, a body established in 1971 that serves "as the planning and zoning authority for areas that do not have the capacity to administer land use controls (principally, townships and plantations )." He was criticized by environmental groups and some Democratic Party legislators, who Beardsley criticized as "elitist".

In August 2012, Beardsley was appointed to an open seat on the State Board of Education after the Department of Conservation was merged with the Department of Agriculture. In 2015, Beardsley was appointed acting Commissioner of Education by Governor LePage, but he was never confirmed to the position. Governor LePage appointed a series of Deputy Commissioners while continuing to assert Beardsley was de facto "in charge" of the Department despite Democratic legislators' opposition to his confirmation and limits in the length of "acting" capacity. Beardsley resigned at the end of 2016. Controversy about Beardsley's service included questions about his knowledge of sexual abuse perpetrated by Rev. Bob Carlson, who died by suicide in mid-November 2012.

== Education and early life ==
Beardsley was born in Hanover, New Hampshire. He earned a B.A. from Earlham College in Richmond, Indiana and a Ph.D. from Johns Hopkins University in Baltimore, Maryland.
