= Jeff Lee (footballer) =

English footballer

Personal information
- Full name: Jeffrey Lee
- Date of birth: 3 October 1945 (age 81)
- Place of birth: Dewsbury, England
- Position: Left back

Youth career
- Huddersfield Town

Senior career*
Years	Team	Apps	(Gls)
1964–1973	Halifax Town	242	(3)
1973–1977	Peterborough United	172	(12)
- * Club domestic league appearances and goals

Jeffrey Lee (born 3 October 1945) is a former professional football defender who played for Halifax Town and Peterborough United in the Football League.

== Playing career ==
Lee started his career with Huddersfield Town as an amateur and then moved to Halifax Town in 1964/65. He then moved to Peterborough in 1973/74.

In 1979, whilst a Kettering Town player, he was selected in the initial 27-man squad for the England non-league international side by manager Howard Wilkinson. This was the first ever squad called for this newly formed team.

Lee joined Hull City as Terry Dolan's assistant manager in 1992. He remained at the club until Dolan's departure in 1997. He was appointed as the chief scout at Huddersfield Town by Peter Jackson in October 1997. He also worked alongside managers Steve Bruce, Lou Macari and Mick Wadsworth in the years following.

In 2002, Wadsworth appointed Lee to the coaching staff though he was made redundant in May 2003 as the club were in dire financial trouble. However, once Peter Jackson was re-appointed in June 2003, Lee returned to the club as chief scout, a role he remained in until 2004.
