= 1973 Watney Cup =

Fourth edition of the Watney Cup

Watney Mann Invitation Cup

Tournament details
- Country: England; Wales
- Dates: 11–18 August
- Teams: 8

Final positions
- Champions: Stoke City (1st title)
- Runners-up: Hull City

Tournament statistics
- Matches played: 7
- Goals scored: 17 (2.43 per match)
- Attendance: 97,414 (13,916 per match)
- Top goal scorer(s): Jimmy Greenhoff (3 goals)

The 1973 Watney Cup was the fourth and last edition of the Watney Mann Invitation Cup, a short-lived invitational association football tournament.

It was won by Stoke City, who beat Hull City in the final at the Victoria Ground.

== Background ==
The Watney Cup was introduced in 1970 to help increase the competitiveness of pre-season fixtures. Its name was a result of a sponsorship from brewing company Watney Combe & Reid. The tournament featured eight invited teams, with two selected from each division of the Football League. Those chosen to participate were the top two highest scoring teams from each division who had not gained promotion nor earned a place in a European competition the previous season.

== Format ==
The competition was a straight knockout tournament. In continuation from the second and third editions of the Watney Cup, games that ended level would go straight to penalties. In the inaugural edition, an additional 30 minutes of extra time would have taken place to determine a winner prior to a penalty shoot-out.

== Teams ==
First Division

- Stoke City
- West Ham United

Second Division

- Bristol City
- Hull City

Third Division

- Bristol Rovers
- Plymouth Argyle

Fourth Division

- Mansfield Town
- Peterborough United

== Tournament ==
=== Quarter-finals ===
11 August 1973

Bristol Rovers (3)	1–1	West Ham United (1)
Bannister 31'	Report	Taylor 38' (o.g.)
Penalties
	6–5

Eastville Stadium, Bristol
Attendance: 19,974
11 August 1973

Mansfield Town (4)	0–3	Hull City (2)
	Report	Galvin; Greenwood; McGill

Field Mill, Mansfield
Attendance: 6,137
11 August 1973

Peterborough United (4)	1–2	Bristol City (2)
Lee 11' (pen.)	Report	Gould 56', 82'

London Road Stadium, Peterborough
Attendance: 9,138
11 August 1973

Plymouth Argyle (3)	0–1	Stoke City (1)
	Report	Hurst 62'

Home Park, Plymouth
Attendance: 17,501

=== Semi-finals ===
14 August 1973

Bristol Rovers (3)	0–1	Hull City (2)
	Report	Lord 55'

Eastville Stadium, Bristol
Attendance: 12,693
14 August 1973

Stoke City (1)	4–1	Bristol City (2)
Hurst; Pejic; Conroy; Greenhoff	Report	Ritchie

Victoria Ground, Stoke
Attendance: 13,812

=== Final ===
18 August 1973
15:00 (BST)

Stoke City (1)	2–0	Hull City (2)
Greenhoff 16', 67'	Report

Victoria Ground, Stoke
Attendance: 18,159
Referee: Unknown

== Goalscorers ==
Rank	Player	Club	Goals
1	(England) Jimmy Greenhoff	Stoke City	3
2	(England) Bobby Gould	Bristol City	2
2	(England) Geoff Hurst	Stoke City	2
3	10 players	Various	1
