= Malcolm Lord =

English footballer (born 1946)

Personal information
- Date of birth: 25 October 1946 (age 80)
- Place of birth: Driffield, England
- Position: Midfielder

Youth career
- 1964–1967: Hull City

Senior career*
Years	Team	Apps	(Gls)
1965–1979	Hull City	298	(24)
1978	California Surf	22	(3)
1979–1980	Scarborough		
Total		320	(26)
- * Club domestic league appearances and goals

Malcolm Lord (born 25 October 1946) is an English former professional footballer who spent nearly his entire career at Hull City. Playing primarily as a midfielder, he also briefly featured for both California Surf and Scarborough towards the end of his playing days.

== Career ==
Lord was born in Driffield, and joined nearby Hull City as an amateur in 1964. He turned professional a year later but had to wait for his competitive debut, which eventually arrived in early 1967. His first goal came in the Tigers' 2–1 away win over Derby County on 20 April 1968.

On 3 June 1973, Lord was one of four Hull players to score in the club's 5–0 friendly win over Guyana in Georgetown. A few months later, on 29 September 1973, the Englishman scored a brace against Cardiff City at Ninian Park, earning his side a 3–1 win.

Lord is a member of a select group of players who have featured for Hull City over 150 times. As a thank you for his service to the club, Lord was granted a testimonial, (Note: Sources conflict over when the testimonial was played. It was likely between 1979 and 1981.) in which he captained an ex-Tigers side against a TV All-Stars XI led by Hull-born actor and presenter Roy North. 1966 World Cup winner Bobby Charlton is believed to have featured in this game.

== Honours ==
Hull City

- Watney Cup runner-up: 1973

Individual

- Hull City Player of the Year: 1974–75
