= Drugs (journal) =

- Discipline: Drug therapy, pharmacology
- Language: English
- Edited by: Sue Pochon

Publication details
- History: 1971-present
- Publisher: Adis International (Springer Nature)
- Frequency: 18/year
- Open access: Hybrid
- Impact factor: 14.4 (2024)

Standard abbreviations
- ISO 4: Drugs

Indexing
- CODEN: DRUGAY
- ISSN: 0012-6667 (print); 1179-1950 (web)
- LCCN: 71-612913
- OCLC no.: 01566990

Links
- Journal homepage; Online archive

Drugs is a peer-reviewed medical journal published by Adis International (Springer Nature) that covers topics in drugs and therapeutics. Besides research articles, the journal also publishes "Adis Drug Evaluations and AdisInsight Reports", evidence-based, single-agent reviews.

== Abstracting and indexing ==
Drugs is abstracted and indexed in:

- MEDLINE
- EMBASE/Excerpta Medica
- International Pharmaceutical Abstracts
- BIOSIS Previews
- Current Contents/Clinical Medicine
- Current Contents/Life Sciences
- Science Citation Index
- CINAHL
- PASCAL
- Chemical Abstracts Service
- Sociedad Iberoamericana de Información Científica

According to the Journal Citation Reports it received an impact factor of 14.4, ranking it 1st out of 106 journals in the category "Toxicology" and ranking it 7th out of 352 journals in the category "Pharmacology & Pharmacy"
