= Paul Feasey =

English footballer

Personal information
- Date of birth: 4 May 1933
- Place of birth: Hull, England
- Date of death: January 2012 (aged 78)
- Height: 5 ft 8 in (1.73 m)
- Position: Centre half

Senior career*
Years	Team	Apps	(Gls)
- York Railway Institute
1949–1966	Hull City	271	(0)
- Goole Town
Total		271	(0)

Managerial career
- Goole Town
- * Club domestic league appearances and goals

Paul Feasey (4 May 1933 – January 2012) was an English professional footballer who played as a centre half.

== Career ==
Born in Hull, Feasey played for York Railway Institute, Hull City and Goole Town. He was also player-manager at Goole Town.

== Later life and death ==
Feasey died in January 2012, at the age of 78, after suffering from dementia.
