= Richard Beardsley (diplomat) =

American diplomat (1838–1876)

Richard Beardsley (1838–January 23, 1876) was a US diplomat. He served as Consul General in Jerusalem in 1870 and Consul General in Egypt from September 1872 until his death.
