= William H. Beardsley =

American irrigation pioneer (1850–1925)

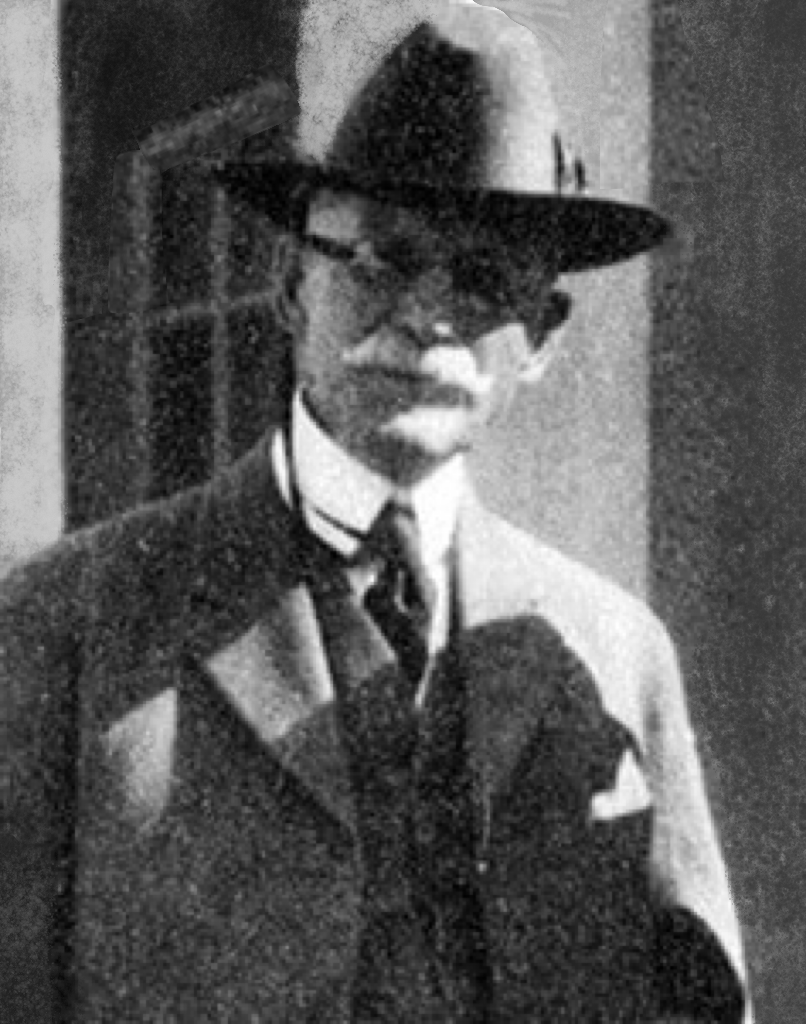
- Beardsley in 1919
- Born: November 13, 1850; Hamilton, Ohio
- Died: December 15, 1925 (aged 75)
- Education: Miami University
- Occupations: Irrigation Engineer; Inventor

William Henry Beardsley (November 13, 1850 – December 15, 1925) was an American irrigation pioneer and inventor from Ohio who helped irrigate part of the West Valley of Phoenix, Arizona.

== Early life ==
William Beardsley was born on November 13, 1850, in Hamilton, Ohio.

He attended Miami University from 1867 to 1870. He worked for a local tool manufacturing company, Nile Tool Works for a time before changing careers and creating his publishing business. Beardsley would change careers twice more in Ohio, beginning a furniture business with James Edwin Campbell and venturing into the blackboard business where he recorded found decent success.

== Irrigation project ==
In 1892, William Beardsley readily joined his brother, George, a civil engineer tasked with building and a substantial irrigation system in Arizona. George died only three years into the project on April 21, 1895, leaving William to complete the project alone as general manager of George's company, the Agua Fria Construction Company.

From 1892 to 1895, the Agua Fria Construction Company built Dyer Diversion Dam (initially known as Beardsley Dam), stopping in 1895 due to funding. In the fall of that year, a flood would destroy the western side of the existing dam. Fortunately for Beardsley, associates of his from Ohio took possession of the assets of the construction company and deeded them back to him to continue his work. Beardsley tried to restart the project but work was progressed slowly due to rough weather and terrain.

As 1902 approached, he started to run into issues with the federal government, specifically with the Department of Interior and the then newly founded Reclamation Service. Technicalities with surveys and public lands would hold the project up for another 17 years.

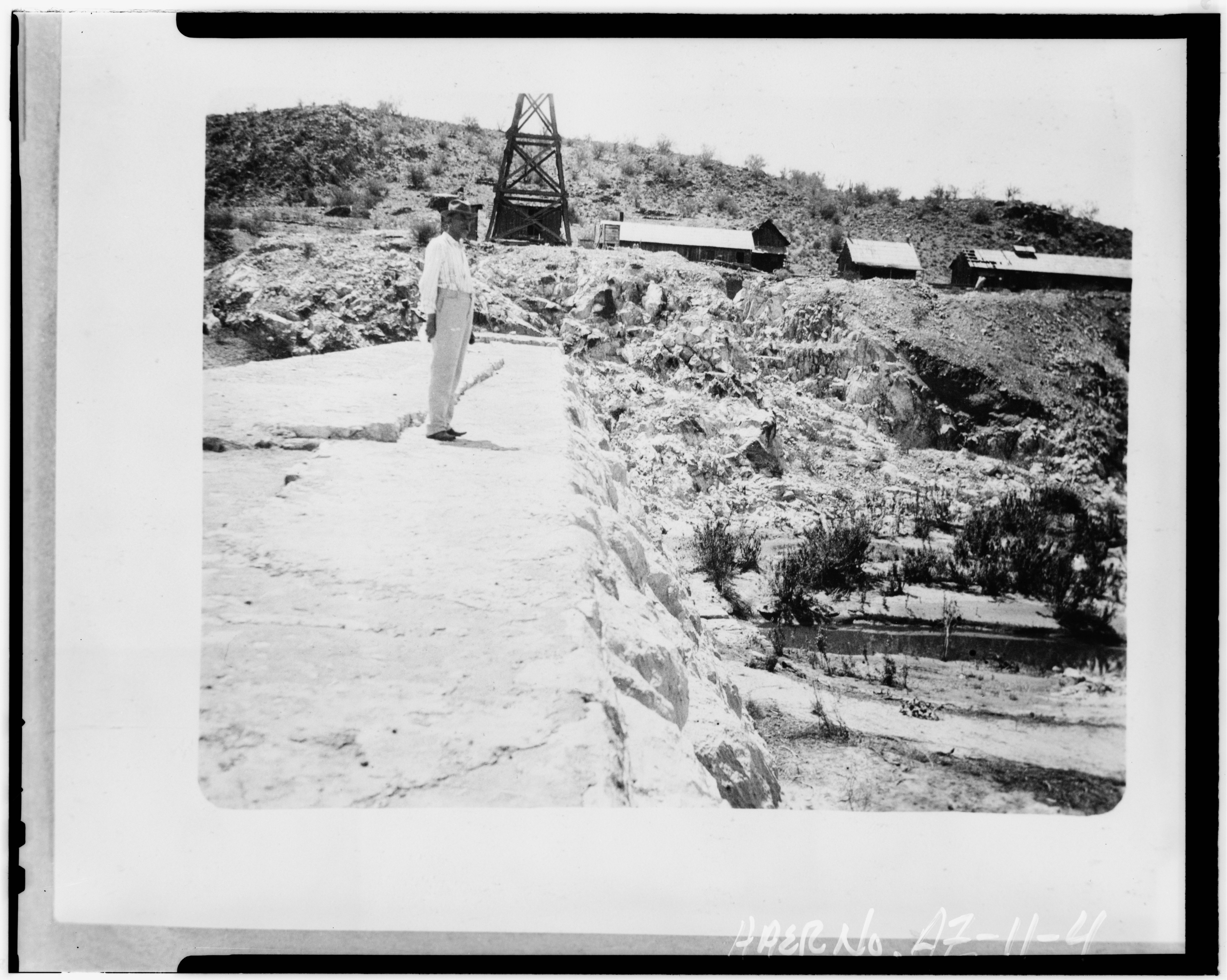
William Beardsley standing atop diversion dam. East cableway tower and construction camp, Camp Dyer are visible in the background.

Finally, in 1919 construction began on a multiple-arch dam designed by engineer Carl Pleasant. Beardsley's son, Robert, assisted in the Arizona project after graduating in 1919 with an engineering degree from Sheffield Scientific School of Yale College in New Haven, Connecticut. During this time, William Beardsley allowed Robert, Pleasant and other investors take over the project. Beardsley's original Camp Dryer Dam would be completed in 1926. The "Carl" Pleasant Dam, was constructed between 1926 and 1928 creating the upper portion of the Lake, and renamed the Waddell Dam in 1964.

Later, a canal would also be built, named the Beardsley Canal, that moved water from Lake Pleasant to ranches as far as thirty-three miles away in present day Buckeye, Arizona.

Today, Beardsley's project is known as the Maricopa Water District (MWD) which maintains its original water rights to the Aqua Fria River and is entitled to 157,600 acre-feet of water stored in Lake Pleasant.

While living in Arizona, William Beardsley also started his own town, Beardsley, which is a non-incorporated area in present day Sun City.

== Personal life ==
William Beardsley married Ida R. Oglesby in December 1888. The couple had one child together, Robert Oglesby Beardsley, born in 1889.

Aside from the irrigation project in Arizona, Beardsley went on to invent and acquire patents for the Keyboard Adding Machine in March 1891 and an adjustable chair in 1895.

== Death and legacy ==
After finishing his brother's work in Arizona, William Beardsley moved to Los Angeles, California, where he died December 15, 1925. He is buried in Woodside Cemetery, Middletown, Ohio.

Beardsley Road in Phoenix is named in his honor.
