= Barsley =

Barsley is an English toponymic surname, a variant of Bardsley or Barnsley.

Notable people with the surname include:

- Dave Barsley (1939–2021), Australian rugby league footballer
- Jason Barsley (born 1978), Australian rugby league footballer
- Vaila Barsley (born 1987), Scottish footballer

== See also ==
- Bardsley (surname)
- Barnsley (surname)
