= John Beardsley (cleric) =

- Born: April 23, 1732; Shelton, Connecticut
- Died: August 23, 1809 (aged 77); Kingston, New Brunswick
- Education: King's College, New York
- Occupation: Anglican priest
- Known for: Loyalist cleric; father of Freemasonry in New Brunswick

John Beardsley (April 23, 1732 Shelton, Connecticut – August 23, 1809 Kingston, New Brunswick) was an Anglican priest in Canada.

A graduate of King's College, New York, he received ordination in England and returned in 1762 to serve congregations in Poughkeepsie, New York, and Fishkill, New York. In 1778, he served as chaplain to Beverley Robinson's Loyal American Regiment

Beardsley arrived in Canada as a loyalist. He is remembered as a loyalist cleric and father of freemasonry in New Brunswick.
