= Bardsley, Greater Manchester =

Coordinates: 53.513°N 2.106°W

Bardsley
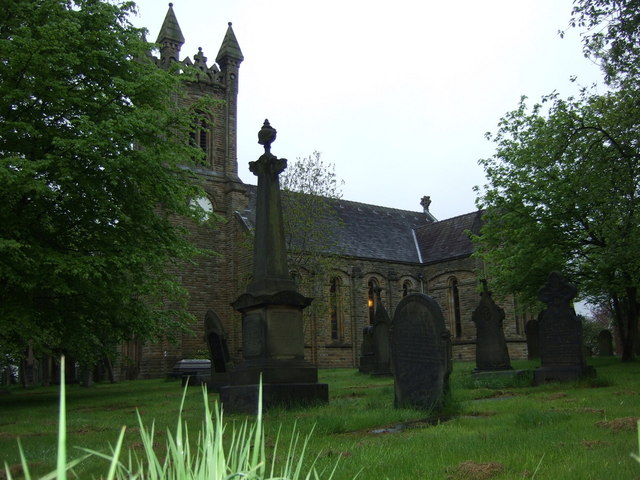
- St Thomas Church

- Location within Greater Manchester
- OS grid reference: SD929018
- Metropolitan borough: Oldham
- Metropolitan county: Greater Manchester
- Region: North West
- Country: England
- Sovereign state: United Kingdom
- Post town: OLDHAM
- Postcode district: OL8
- Dialling code: 0161
- Police: Greater Manchester
- Fire: Greater Manchester
- Ambulance: North West
- UK Parliament: Oldham West and Royton

Bardsley is a suburban area of Oldham, in Greater Manchester, England.

It lies on undulating land by the River Medlock, on Oldham's southern boundary with Ashton-under-Lyne in the Metropolitan Borough of Tameside.

== History ==
The place name itself is derived from the Anglo-Saxon given name "Beornraed" plus the Anglo-Saxon word "leah" which means wood clearing, therefore meaning "a woodland clearing of a man called Beornraed".

== Governance ==
Lying within the historic county boundaries of Lancashire from a very early time, Bardsley anciently formed a hamlet within the township and parish of Ashton-under-Lyne.

Bardsley was formerly a chapelry in the parish of Ashton-under-Lyne, On 31 December 1894 following the Local Government Act 1894, Bardsley constituted a civil parish within the Limehurst Rural District and administrative county of Lancashire. Limehurst was included in the Ashton-under-Lyne Poor Law Union.

In 1951, owing to urbanisation, part of Bardsley was incorporated into the neighbouring Oldham and in 1954, Limehurst Rural District was abolished and the parish of Bardsley was merged with Oldham, Ashton under Lyne and Failsworth and Bardsley became part of the County Borough of Oldham. In 1951 the parish had a population of 1499.

Following the Local Government Act 1972, the County Borough of Oldham was abolished and Bardsley became part of the newly formed Metropolitan Borough of Oldham in Greater Manchester.

== Transport ==
Bee Network provide the following services in Bardsley, all terminating at Ashton-under-Lyne.

409 service runs to Rochdale via Oldham and Royton.

396 runs to Middleton via Hathershaw, Chadderton and Mills Hill.

151 to Higher Crumpsall via Failsworth and Moston

The nearest railway station is Ashton-under-Lyne which provides links to Manchester, Southport and Huddersfield.
