= Don Beardsley =

Scottish footballer

Personal information
- Full name: Donald Thomas Beardsley
- Date of birth: 23 October 1946 (age 80)
- Place of birth: Alyth, Scotland
- Position: Left-back

Youth career
- 1962–1966: Hull City

Senior career*
Years	Team	Apps	(Gls)
1964–1973	Hull City	130	(0)
1972	→ Doncaster Rovers (loan)	10	(0)
1973–1975	Grimsby Town	66	(0)
–	Louth United		
- * Club domestic league appearances and goals

Donald Thomas Beardsley (born 23 October 1946) is a Scottish former footballer who made more than 200 appearances in the English Football League playing as a left-back for Hull City, Doncaster Rovers, and Grimsby Town.

He played in the first professional game in England to be decided by a penalty shootout, the semi-final of the Watney Cup on 5 August 1970 in which Hull City lost to Manchester United at Boothferry Park.
