= 1965–66 Hull City A.F.C. season =

English football club season

Hull City
1965–66 season
- Chairman: Harold Needler
- Manager: Cliff Britton
- Stadium: Boothferry Park
- Third Division: 1st (promoted)
- FA Cup: Sixth round
- League Cup: Second round
- Top goalscorer: League: Ken Wagstaff (27); All: Ken Wagstaff (31)
Home colours	Away colours

The 1965–66 season was the 62nd season in the history of Hull City Association Football Club and their sixth consecutive season in the Third Division. In addition to the domestic league, the club would also participate in the FA Cup and the League Cup.

== Summary ==
The campaign has since been regarded as one of the most successful in the club's history. This is largely because the Tigers won their third-ever league title, which coincidentally would be their last for another 55 years. The drought was eventually broken in the 2020–21 season, when they won EFL League One.

Elsewhere, Hull endured a memorable FA Cup run, defeating First Division side Nottingham Forest prior to a sixth round exit. Even then, the Tigers only lost to another top flight opponent, Chelsea, who they heroically forced to a draw at Stamford Bridge, before bowing out at home in the replay.

Aside from on-pitch results, this season was also notable for the many iconic figures within the Tigers’ ranks. Led by long-serving manager Cliff Britton, Hull operated with an attacking unit affectionately known as "the Front Five". Of the 109 league goals the club scored in 1965–66, 100 of them were attributed to Ian Butler, Ken Houghton, Chris Chilton, Ken Wagstaff, and Ray Henderson.

Irishman Maurice Swan was entrusted as the team's goalkeeper for the majority of the campaign, whilst legendary captain and eventual club record appearance maker Andy Davidson anchored the defence from right full-back. Dennis Butler often featured to the left of him, with future Wales international Alan Jarvis and local lads Mike Milner and Chris Simpkin tending to service as the Tigers' half-backs.

== Competitions ==
=== Third Division ===
==== League table ====
Pos	Team	Pld	W	D	L	GF	GA	GAv	Pts	Promotion or relegation
1	Hull City (C, P)	46	31	7	8	109	62	1.758	69	Promotion to the Second Division
2	Millwall (P)	46	27	11	8	76	43	1.767	65	Promotion to the Second Division
3	Queens Park Rangers	46	24	9	13	95	65	1.462	57	
4	Scunthorpe United	46	21	11	14	80	67	1.194	53	
5	Workington	46	19	14	13	67	57	1.175	52	

(C) Champions; (P) Promoted

==== Matches ====
Win Draw Loss

#	Date	Home	Result	Away	Venue	Att.	Scorers (Note: Hull scorers only)
1	21.08.65	Hull City	3–2	Scunthorpe United	H	18,829	Houghton, Wagstaff (2)
2	24.08.65	Watford	1–1	Hull City	A	10,648	Chilton
3	28.08.65	Brighton & Hove Albion	1–2	Hull City	A	16,560	Wagstaff, Henderson
4	01.09.65	Hull City	1–0	Swindon Town	H	23,163	Wagstaff
5	04.09.65	Hull City	1–3	Queens Park Rangers	H	20,478	Chilton
6	11.09.65	Mansfield Town	1–2	Hull City	A	14,081	Houghton, Chilton
7	18.09.65	Hull City	1–4	York City	H	20,554	I. Butler
8	25.09.65	Hull City	3–3	Reading	H	14,686	Houghton (2), Chilton
9	02.10.65	Exeter City	1–4	Hull City	A	7,125	Chilton, Houghton (2), Wagstaff
10	06.10.65	Hull City	5–1	Oldham Athletic	H	17,028	Wagstaff, Houghton, Chilton (3)
11	09.10.65	Swansea Town	4–2	Hull City	A	7,949	I. Butler, Henderson
12	13.10.65	Oldham Athletic	2–2	Hull City	A	5,883	Houghton (2)
13	16.10.65	Hull City	3–2	Walsall	H	15,931	Henderson, Wagstaff, Chilton
14	22.10.65	Workington	3–0	Hull City	A	5,482	
15	30.10.65	Hull City	3–0	Bournemouth & Boscombe Athletic	H	12,440	Henderson, Chilton, Wagstaff
16	06.11.65	Southend United	0–2	Hull City	A	8,088	(o.g.), Henderson
17	20.11.65	Shrewsbury Town	2–2	Hull City	A	5,316	I. Butler, Wagstaff
18	24.11.65	Hull City	3–1	Watford	H	15,511	Houghton (2), Chilton
19	27.11.65	Hull City	1–1	Grimsby Town	H	20,681	Wagstaff
20	11.12.65	Hull City	6–1	Bristol Rovers	H	16,349	Simpkin, Houghton (2), Henderson, (o.g.), I. Butler
21	17.12.65	Walsall	2–4	Hull City	A	8,617	I. Butler (3), Chilton
22	27.12.65	Hull City	1–0	Millwall	H	40,231	(o.g.)
23	28.12.65	Millwall	3–0	Hull City	A	17,184	
24	01.01.66	Hull City	4–1	Swansea Town	H	22,700	Wagstaff (2), Henderson, Chilton
25	08.01.66	Swindon Town	3–1	Hull City	A	15,875	Houghton
26	15.01.66	Hull City	6–0	Workington	H	14,704	(o.g.), Jarvis, I. Butler (2), Wagstaff, Houghton
27	29.01.66	Scunthorpe United	2–4	Hull City	A	15,570	Henderson (2), Houghton, Chilton
28	05.02.66	Hull City	1–0	Brighton & Hove Albion	H	25,374	Wagstaff
29	19.02.66	Queens Park Rangers	3–3	Hull City	A	12,327	Wagstaff, Chilton, Houghton
30	23.02.66	Gillingham	0–3	Hull City	A	10,527	Wagstaff, Houghton, Chilton
31	26.02.66	Hull City	4–0	Mansfield Town	H	28,214	Wagstaff (2), Henderson, Houghton
32	09.03.66	Hull City	1–0	Gillingham	H	30,122	Wagstaff
33	12.03.66	York City	1–2	Hull City	A	19,420	Wagstaff, I. Butler
34	18.03.66	Reading	0–1	Hull City	A	14,196	I. Butler
35	08.04.66	Oxford United	0–2	Hull City	A	14,359	Wagstaff, Houghton
36	09.04.66	Brentford	2–4	Hull City	A	9,919	Wagstaff (4)
37	11.04.66	Hull City	2–1	Oxford United	H	31,992	Wagstaff, Chilton
38	16.04.66	Hull City	2–1	Shrewsbury Town	H	24,333	Chilton, Jarvis
39	20.04.66	Hull City	6–1	Exeter City	H	28,055	Chilton (3), Henderson (2), Houghton
40	23.04.66	Grimsby Town	1–0	Hull City	A	18,018	
41	25.04.66	Peterborough United	4–1	Hull City	A	9,547	Chilton
42	30.04.66	Hull City	4–1	Brentford	H	25,039	Chilton, (o.g.), Jarvis, Henderson
43	06.05.66	Bristol Rovers	1–2	Hull City	A	9,234	Wagstaff, Chilton
44	10.05.66	Bournemouth & Boscombe Athletic	1–1	Hull City	A	7,861	I. Butler
45	17.05.66	Hull City	2–1	Peterborough United	H	28,255	Houghton, Chilton
46	20.05.66	Hull City	1–0	Southend United	H	30,371	I. Butler

=== FA Cup ===
==== Matches ====
Win Draw Loss

#	Date	Home	Result	Away	Venue	Att.	Scorers
1R	13.11.65	Bradford Park Avenue	2–3	Hull City	A	11,487	Houghton, Chilton, I. Butler
2R	08.12.65	Gateshead	0–4	Hull City	A	5,935	Wagstaff, Henderson, I. Butler, Houghton
3R	22.01.66	Hull City	1–0	Southampton	H	28,851	Houghton
4R	12.02.66	Hull City	2–0	Nottingham Forest	H	38,055	Heath (2) 19', 83'
5R	05.03.66	Hull City	2–0	Southport	H	38,871	Chilton
6R	26.03.66	Chelsea	2–2	Hull City	A	46,324	Wagstaff (2) 85', 89'
6R	26.03.66	Hull City	1–3	Chelsea	H	45,328	Simpkin 37'

=== League Cup ===
==== Matches ====
Win Draw Loss

#	Date	Home	Result	Away	Venue	Att.	Scorers
2R	22.09.95	Hull City	2–2	Derby County	H	15,601	Houghton (2)
2R	29.09.95	Derby County	4–3	Hull City	A	9,645	Wagstaff, Chilton, Simpkin

== Squad ==
Name	Position	Nationality	Place of birth	Date of birth (age) (Note: Players' ages listed as they were on 1 July 1965, the official start date of the 1965–66 season)	Previous club	Date signed	Fee
Goalkeepers
Maurice Swan	GK	IRL	Dublin	27 September 1938 (age 26)	(Wales) Cardiff City	June 1963	£5,000
Mike Williams	GK	ENG	Hull	23 October 1944 (age 20)	Youth	June 1960	–
Defenders
Mick Brown	FB	ENG	Walsall	11 July 1939 (age 25)	Youth	October 1958	–
Dennis Butler	FB	ENG	Parsons Green	7 March 1943 (age 22)	Chelsea	June 1963	£10,000
Les Collinson	HB	ENG	Hull	2 December 1935 (age 29)	Reserves	August 1953	–
Andy Davidson	FB	SCO	Douglas Water	13 July 1932 (age 32)	Youth	September 1949	–
Paddy Greenwood	FB	ENG	Hull	17 October 1946 (age 18)	Reserves	October 1964	–
Alan Jarvis	HB	WAL	Wrexham	4 August 1943 (age 21)	Everton	May 1964	Free
Mike Milner	HB	ENG	Hull	21 September 1939 (age 25)	Youth	July 1957	–
Len Sharpe	FB	ENG	Scunthorpe	29 November 1932 (age 32)	Scunthorpe United	June 1962	£750
Chris Simpkin	HB	ENG	Hull	24 April 1944 (age 21)	Youth	April 1962	–
Gerry Summers	HB	ENG	Birmingham	4 October 1933 (age 31)	Sheffield United	April 1964	£12,000
Attackers
Ian Butler	OF	ENG	Darton	1 February 1944 (age 21)	Rotherham United	January 1965	£40,000
Chris Chilton	CF	ENG	Sproatley	25 June 1943 (age 22)	Youth	August 1960	–
Norman Corner	CF	ENG	Horden	16 February 1943 (age 22)	Horden Colliery Welfare	August 1962	Unknown
Terry Heath	IF	ENG	Leicester	17 November 1943 (age 21)	Leicester City	May 1964	£8,000
Ray Henderson	OF	ENG	Wallsend	31 March 1937 (age 28)	Middlesbrough	June 1961	Unknown
Ken Houghton	IF	ENG	Rotherham	18 October 1939 (age 25)	Rotherham United	January 1965	£40,000
Ken Wagstaff	IF	ENG	Langwith	24 November 1942 (age 22)	Mansfield Town	November 1964	£40,000
Billy Wilkinson	IF	ENG	Stockton-on-Tees	24 March 1943 (age 22)	Stockton	May 1962	Unknown
Ron Young	OF	ENG	Dunston	31 August 1945 (age 19)	Youth	August 1963	–
