= The Front Five =

Nickname for five Hull City players in the mid-1960s

The Front Five is the collective nickname used for the five footballers who were the primary forward line of Hull City during the mid-1960s. Ian Butler, Chris Chilton, Ray Henderson, Ken Houghton, and Ken Wagstaff were all simultaneously active for the club between 1965 and 1968. The quintet's zenith was the 1965–66 season, in which Hull were promoted as champions of the Third Division. During that campaign, Hull City scored 109 goals in the league, 100 of which were scored by the Front Five.

== Ian Butler ==
Ian Butler joined Hull City for £40,000 in January 1965, arriving from Rotherham United alongside Houghton. Playing as a left winger, he amassed 339 appearances across all competitions during his eight years with the club, scoring 70 goals before leaving in July 1973.

== Chris Chilton ==
Chris Chilton was first contracted to Hull City, his hometown club, at age 16. The centre forward would become one of the best players in the club's history. Scoring 222 goals in 477 appearances across all competitions, "Chillo", as he was affectionally known, is still Hull's record goalscorer to this day. He was signed by Coventry City for £92,000 in August 1971. He was one of five inaugural inductees to Hull's Hall of Fame in 2018. Furthermore, the East Stand of the MKM Stadium was posthumously renamed in his honour on 2 March 2022. Chilton had died the year before, on 20 May 2021, aged 77.

== Ray Henderson ==
Ray Henderson signed for Hull City from Middlesbrough in June 1961. The Front Five's right winger would go on to rack up 61 goals from 264 appearances across all competitions during his seven-year spell in the East Riding of Yorkshire. He left for Reading in October 1968. The Wallsend native died on 18 January 2024, aged 86.

== Ken Houghton ==
Ken Houghton arrived alongside Butler from Rotherham United in January 1965, also for £40,000. The inside forward played 304 times for the club, scoring 91 goals in the process. He left for Humber derby rivals Scunthorpe United in May 1973. Houghton returned to Hull, initially as interim manager but later permanent manager, in February 1978. He was dismissed in December 1979. Houghton died on 26 September 2025, aged 85.

== Ken Wagstaff ==
Ken Wagstaff signed for Hull City in November 1964, joining from Mansfield Town. Thanks to his partnership with the other four, particularly Chilton, the inside forward scored 197 goals in 434 appearances across all competitions whilst with Hull City. Nicknamed "Waggy", he only left Hull upon retiring in 1976, and was later inducted to the club's Hall of Fame in 2018.
