= 1964–65 Football League =

66th season of the Football League

The Football League
- Season: 1964–65
- Champions: Manchester United

The 1964–65 season was the 66th completed season of the Football League.

Manchester United won its sixth league title and its first since the Munich air disaster of 1958. The Second, Third and Fourth Divisions were won by Newcastle United, Carlisle United and Brighton & Hove Albion respectively.

== Final league tables ==
The tables below are reproduced here in the exact form that they can be found at The Rec.Sport.Soccer Statistics Foundation website and in Rothmans Book of Football League Records 1888–89 to 1978–79, with home and away statistics separated.

Beginning with the season 1894–95, clubs finishing level on points were separated according to goal average (goals scored divided by goals conceded), or more properly put, goal ratio. In case one or more teams had the same goal difference, this system favoured those teams who had scored fewer goals. The goal average system was eventually scrapped beginning with the 1976–77 season.

Since the Fourth Division was established in the 1958–59 season, the bottom four teams of that division have been required to apply for re-election.

== First Division ==
First Division
- Season: 1964–65
- Champions: Manchester United; 6th English title
- Relegated: Wolverhampton Wanderers; Birmingham City
- European Cup: Manchester United
- Cup Winners' Cup: Liverpool; West Ham United
- Inter-Cities Fairs Cup: Leeds United; Chelsea; Everton
- Matches: 462
- Goals: 1,543 (3.34 per match)
- Top goalscorer: Andy McEvoy; Jimmy Greaves (29 goals each)

Pos	Team	Pld	W	D	L	GF	GA	GAv	Pts	Qualification or relegation
1	Manchester United (C)	42	26	9	7	89	39	2.282	61	Qualification for the European Cup preliminary round
2	Leeds United	42	26	9	7	83	52	1.596	61	Qualification for the Inter-Cities Fairs Cup first round
3	Chelsea	42	24	8	10	89	54	1.648	56	Qualification for the Inter-Cities Fairs Cup first round
4	Everton	42	17	15	10	69	60	1.150	49	Qualification for the Inter-Cities Fairs Cup first round
5	Nottingham Forest	42	17	13	12	71	67	1.060	47	
6	Tottenham Hotspur	42	19	7	16	87	71	1.225	45	
7	Liverpool	42	17	10	15	67	73	0.918	44	Qualification for the European Cup Winners' Cup first round (Note: Liverpool qualified for the European Cup Winners' Cup as the 1964–65 FA Cup winners.)
8	Sheffield Wednesday	42	16	11	15	57	55	1.036	43	
9	West Ham United	42	19	4	19	82	71	1.155	42	Qualification for the European Cup Winners' Cup first round (Note: West Ham United qualified for the European Cup Winners' Cup as the Cup Winners' Cup winners.)
10	Blackburn Rovers	42	16	10	16	83	79	1.051	42	
11	Stoke City	42	16	10	16	67	66	1.015	42	
12	Burnley	42	16	10	16	70	70	1.000	42	
13	Arsenal	42	17	7	18	69	75	0.920	41	
14	West Bromwich Albion	42	13	13	16	70	65	1.077	39	
15	Sunderland	42	14	9	19	64	74	0.865	37	
16	Aston Villa	42	16	5	21	57	82	0.695	37	
17	Blackpool	42	12	11	19	67	78	0.859	35	
18	Leicester City	42	11	13	18	69	85	0.812	35	
19	Sheffield United	42	12	11	19	50	64	0.781	35	
20	Fulham	42	11	12	19	60	78	0.769	34	
21	Wolverhampton Wanderers (R)	42	13	4	25	59	89	0.663	30	Relegation to the Second Division
22	Birmingham City (R)	42	8	11	23	64	96	0.667	27	Relegation to the Second Division

Source: World Football
Rules for classification: 1) Points; 2) Goal average; 3) Goals scored
(C) Champions; (R) Relegated

=== Results ===
Home \ Away	ARS	AST	BIR	BLB	BLP	BUR	CHE	EVE	FUL	LEE	LEI	LIV	MUN	NOT	SHU	SHW	STK	SUN	TOT	WBA	WHU	WOL
Arsenal		3–1	3–0	1–1	3–1	3–2	1–3	3–1	2–0	1–2	4–3	0–0	2–3	0–3	1–1	1–1	3–2	3–1	3–1	1–1	0–3	4–1
Aston Villa	3–1		3–0	0–4	3–2	1–0	2–2	1–2	2–0	1–2	1–0	0–1	2–1	2–1	2–1	2–0	3–0	2–1	1–0	0–1	2–3	3–2
Birmingham	2–3	0–1		5–5	3–0	2–1	1–6	3–5	2–2	3–3	2–0	0–0	2–4	1–1	1–1	0–0	1–2	4–3	1–0	1–1	2–1	0–1
Blackburn Rovers	1–2	5–1	3–1		4–1	1–4	0–3	0–2	2–0	0–2	3–1	3–2	0–5	1–1	4–0	0–1	1–1	3–2	3–1	4–2	4–0	4–1
Blackpool	1–1	3–1	3–1	4–2		2–4	3–2	1–1	3–0	4–0	1–1	2–3	1–2	0–2	2–2	1–0	1–1	3–1	1–1	3–0	1–2	1–1
Burnley	2–1	2–2	2–0	1–1	2–2		6–2	1–1	4–0	0–1	2–1	1–5	0–0	2–2	3–1	4–1	1–0	0–0	2–2	0–1	3–2	1–1
Chelsea	2–1	2–1	3–1	5–1	2–0	0–1		5–1	1–0	2–0	4–1	4–0	0–2	0–1	3–0	1–1	4–0	3–1	3–1	2–2	0–3	2–1
Everton	1–0	3–1	1–1	2–3	0–0	2–1	1–1		2–0	0–1	2–2	2–1	3–3	1–0	1–1	1–1	1–1	1–1	4–1	3–2	1–1	5–0
Fulham	3–4	1–1	3–1	3–2	3–3	0–1	1–2	1–1		2–2	5–2	1–1	2–1	4–1	1–2	2–0	1–4	1–0	4–1	3–1	1–2	2–0
Leeds United	3–1	1–0	4–1	1–1	3–0	5–1	2–2	4–1	2–2		3–2	4–2	0–1	1–2	4–1	2–0	3–1	2–1	3–1	1–0	2–1	3–2
Leicester City	2–3	1–1	4–4	2–3	3–2	0–2	1–1	2–1	5–1	2–2		2–0	2–2	3–2	0–2	2–2	0–1	0–1	4–2	4–2	1–0	3–2
Liverpool	3–2	5–1	4–3	3–2	2–2	1–1	2–0	0–4	3–2	2–1	0–1		0–2	2–0	3–1	4–2	3–2	0–0	1–1	0–3	2–2	2–1
Manchester United	3–1	7–0	1–1	3–0	2–0	3–2	4–0	2–1	4–1	0–1	1–0	3–0		3–0	1–1	1–0	1–1	1–0	4–1	2–2	3–1	3–0
Nottingham Forest	3–0	4–2	4–3	2–5	2–0	3–1	2–2	3–1	2–3	0–0	2–1	2–2	2–2		0–0	2–2	3–1	5–2	1–2	0–0	3–2	0–2
Sheffield United	4–0	4–2	3–1	1–1	1–3	2–0	0–2	0–0	1–1	0–3	0–2	3–0	0–1	0–2		2–3	0–1	3–0	3–3	1–1	2–1	0–2
Sheffield Wednesday	2–1	3–1	5–2	1–0	4–1	5–1	2–3	0–1	1–1	3–0	0–0	1–0	1–0	0–0	0–2		1–1	2–0	1–0	1–1	2–0	2–0
Stoke City	4–1	2–1	2–1	1–1	4–2	2–0	0–2	0–2	3–1	2–3	3–3	1–1	1–2	1–1	0–1	4–1		3–1	2–0	2–0	3–1	0–2
Sunderland	0–2	2–2	2–1	1–0	1–0	3–2	3–0	4–0	0–0	3–3	3–3	2–3	1–0	4–0	3–1	3–0	2–2		2–1	2–2	3–2	1–2
Tottenham Hotspur	3–1	4–0	4–1	5–2	4–1	4–1	1–1	2–2	3–0	0–0	6–2	3–0	1–0	4–0	2–0	3–2	2–1	3–0		1–0	3–2	7–4
West Bromwich Albion	0–0	3–1	0–2	0–0	1–3	1–2	0–2	4–0	2–2	1–2	6–0	3–0	1–1	2–2	0–1	1–0	5–3	4–1	2–0		4–2	5–1
West Ham United	2–1	3–0	2–1	1–1	2–1	3–2	3–2	0–1	2–0	3–1	0–0	2–1	3–1	2–3	3–1	1–2	0–1	2–3	3–2	6–1		5–0
Wolverhampton Wanderers	0–1	0–1	0–2	4–2	1–2	1–2	0–3	2–4	0–0	0–1	1–1	1–3	2–4	1–2	1–0	3–1	3–1	3–0	3–1	3–2	4–3	

Updated to match(es) played on unknown. Source: Ian Laschke: Rothmans Book of Football League Records 1888–89 to 1978–79. Macdonald and Jane’s, London & Sydney, 1980.
Legend: Blue = home team win; Yellow = draw; Red = away team win.

=== Maps ===
Locations of the London-based First Division teams
Locations of the First Division teams

== Second Division ==
Second Division
- Season: 1964–65
- Champions: Newcastle United
- Promoted: Newcastle United; Northampton Town
- Relegated: Swindon Town; Swansea Town
- Cup Winners' Cup: Cardiff City
- Matches: 462
- Goals: 1,470 (3.18 per match)
- Top goalscorer: George O'Brien (34 goals)

Pos	Team	Pld	W	D	L	GF	GA	GAv	Pts	Qualification or relegation
1	Newcastle United (C, P)	42	24	9	9	81	45	1.800	57	Promotion to the First Division
2	Northampton Town (P)	42	20	16	6	66	50	1.320	56	Promotion to the First Division
3	Bolton Wanderers	42	20	10	12	80	58	1.379	50	
4	Southampton	42	17	14	11	83	63	1.317	48	
5	Ipswich Town	42	15	17	10	74	67	1.104	47	
6	Norwich City	42	20	7	15	61	57	1.070	47	
7	Crystal Palace	42	16	13	13	55	51	1.078	45	
8	Huddersfield Town	42	17	10	15	53	51	1.039	44	
9	Derby County	42	16	11	15	84	79	1.063	43	
10	Coventry City	42	17	9	16	72	70	1.029	43	
11	Manchester City	42	16	9	17	63	62	1.016	41	
12	Preston North End	42	14	13	15	76	81	0.938	41	
13	Cardiff City	42	13	14	15	64	57	1.123	40	Qualification for the European Cup Winners' Cup first round (Note: Cardiff City qualified for the European Cup Winners' Cup as the 1964–65 Welsh Cup winners.)
14	Rotherham United	42	14	12	16	70	69	1.014	40	
15	Plymouth Argyle	42	16	8	18	63	79	0.797	40	
16	Bury	42	14	10	18	60	66	0.909	38	
17	Middlesbrough	42	13	9	20	70	76	0.921	35	
18	Charlton Athletic	42	13	9	20	64	75	0.853	35	
19	Leyton Orient	42	12	11	19	50	72	0.694	35	
20	Portsmouth	42	12	10	20	56	77	0.727	34	
21	Swindon Town (R)	42	14	5	23	63	81	0.778	33	Relegation to the Third Division
22	Swansea Town (R)	42	11	10	21	62	84	0.738	32	Relegation to the Third Division

Rules for classification: 1) Points; 2) Goal average; 3) Goals scored
(C) Champions; (P) Promoted; (R) Relegated

=== Results ===
Home \ Away	BOL	BRY	CAR	CHA	COV	CRY	DER	HUD	IPS	LEY	MCI	MID	NEW	NOR	NWC	PLY	POR	PNE	ROT	SOU	SWA	SWI
Bolton Wanderers		0–1	1–0	1–1	1–3	3–0	3–1	1–0	0–0	0–0	4–0	4–2	1–1	0–0	5–2	6–1	3–2	5–1	2–0	3–0	2–1	1–1
Bury	2–1		1–2	2–0	5–0	3–1	2–1	0–2	0–1	2–1	0–2	3–2	1–2	1–4	1–0	0–2	1–1	1–1	0–1	3–3	2–2	6–1
Cardiff City	1–3	4–0		2–1	3–1	0–0	2–1	1–1	0–0	0–2	2–2	6–1	1–1	0–2	1–3	4–0	1–0	3–3	3–2	2–2	5–0	2–0
Charlton Athletic	1–3	1–2	2–2		3–0	1–2	1–3	0–0	4–0	2–0	2–1	0–2	0–1	1–1	2–1	3–2	3–3	2–3	1–1	2–5	1–0	3–2
Coventry City	0–0	2–1	0–2	2–0		0–0	0–2	2–3	5–3	1–1	2–2	3–0	5–4	0–1	3–0	2–0	1–2	3–0	3–5	1–1	3–0	3–2
Crystal Palace	2–0	0–2	0–0	3–1	2–2		2–3	3–0	1–1	1–0	1–1	3–1	1–1	1–2	2–0	2–1	4–2	1–0	2–1	0–2	3–3	3–1
Derby County	2–3	3–1	1–0	4–4	2–1	3–3		2–0	2–3	1–0	2–0	3–3	0–3	2–2	0–1	3–2	4–0	3–1	2–2	2–1	3–4	4–1
Huddersfield Town	1–1	0–2	3–1	0–1	2–1	2–0	3–1		0–0	0–0	1–0	1–0	0–1	2–0	0–0	1–2	2–1	3–0	1–0	0–3	4–0	2–1
Ipswich Town	1–4	1–0	1–1	1–1	1–3	3–2	2–1	3–2		1–1	4–1	5–2	3–1	0–0	3–0	2–2	7–0	1–5	4–4	2–0	3–0	0–0
Leyton Orient	3–1	1–0	1–3	4–2	1–3	0–1	1–4	1–0	0–0		4–3	1–1	2–1	2–2	2–3	2–0	5–2	2–1	2–1	0–0	2–3	0–3
Manchester City	2–4	0–0	2–0	2–1	1–1	0–2	2–0	2–3	4–0	6–0		1–1	3–0	0–2	0–2	2–1	2–0	4–3	2–1	3–1	1–0	1–2
Middlesbrough	5–2	3–3	0–0	1–2	2–3	0–0	1–2	0–0	2–4	2–0	0–1		0–2	1–0	2–0	1–3	4–1	1–1	3–5	4–1	4–0	4–1
Newcastle United	2–0	2–3	2–0	1–1	2–0	2–0	2–2	2–1	2–2	5–0	0–0	2–1		5–0	2–0	2–1	3–0	5–2	3–1	2–1	3–1	1–0
Northampton Town	4–0	2–0	1–0	1–0	1–1	1–1	2–2	3–2	3–2	2–0	2–0	1–1	1–0		0–0	3–1	1–1	2–1	1–0	2–2	2–1	2–1
Norwich City	3–2	1–1	2–1	2–0	1–0	1–2	5–2	0–2	2–1	2–0	4–1	2–0	1–1	1–1		3–0	3–1	4–2	3–0	2–2	2–1	3–1
Plymouth Argyle	1–3	2–2	3–1	1–5	2–3	1–1	1–1	0–0	1–1	1–1	3–2	1–0	2–1	5–2	1–0		2–1	0–1	1–1	4–0	2–1	2–1
Portsmouth	3–0	2–1	1–0	2–3	0–2	1–1	3–1	3–0	0–2	1–1	1–1	2–1	1–2	3–3	4–0	0–1		1–0	2–0	0–3	1–0	5–0
Preston North End	2–2	2–2	1–1	2–1	3–2	1–0	2–2	2–0	4–1	3–0	2–5	4–3	2–0	2–2	3–1	1–3	6–1		0–0	0–0	2–2	2–1
Rotherham United	0–0	3–0	3–1	3–2	0–2	1–0	1–1	2–3	2–2	3–0	0–0	2–3	1–1	1–1	4–0	4–2	1–0	2–2		1–3	4–2	1–0
Southampton	3–2	3–1	1–1	4–0	4–1	0–1	3–3	3–3	1–1	2–2	1–0	0–3	0–1	2–0	1–0	5–0	2–2	3–1	6–1		3–1	2–1
Swansea Town	2–0	2–2	3–2	1–3	1–1	2–1	2–1	2–2	1–1	2–5	3–0	1–2	3–1	1–2	0–0	3–0	0–0	4–0	0–3	3–3		4–0
Swindon Town	1–3	2–0	3–3	2–0	4–1	2–0	4–2	4–1	3–1	1–0	0–1	0–1	1–6	4–2	0–1	2–3	0–0	2–2	3–2	2–1	3–0	

Updated to match(es) played on unknown. Source: Ian Laschke: Rothmans Book of Football League Records 1888–89 to 1978–79. Macdonald and Jane’s, London & Sydney, 1980.
Legend: Blue = home team win; Yellow = draw; Red = away team win.

=== Maps ===
Locations of the London-based Second Division teams
Locations of the Second Division teams

== Third Division ==
Football League Third Division
- Season: 1964–65
- Champions: Carlisle United (1st title)
- Promoted: Bristol City
- Relegated: Barnsley; Colchester United; Luton Town; Port Vale
- Matches: 552
- Goals: 1,667 (3.02 per match)
- Top goalscorer: Ken Wagstaff (Mansfield Town and Hull City) 35

Pos	Team	Pld	W	D	L	GF	GA	GAv	Pts	Promotion or relegation
1	Carlisle United (C, P)	46	25	10	11	76	53	1.434	60	Promotion to the Second Division
2	Bristol City (P)	46	24	11	11	92	55	1.673	59	Promotion to the Second Division
3	Mansfield Town	46	24	11	11	95	61	1.557	59	
4	Hull City	46	23	12	11	91	57	1.596	58	
5	Brentford	46	24	9	13	83	55	1.509	57	
6	Bristol Rovers	46	20	15	11	82	58	1.414	55	
7	Gillingham	46	23	9	14	70	50	1.400	55	
8	Peterborough United	46	22	7	17	85	74	1.149	51	
9	Watford	46	17	16	13	71	64	1.109	50	
10	Grimsby Town	46	16	17	13	68	67	1.015	49	
11	Bournemouth & Boscombe Athletic	46	18	11	17	72	63	1.143	47	
12	Southend United	46	19	8	19	78	71	1.099	46	
13	Reading	46	16	14	16	70	70	1.000	46	
14	Queens Park Rangers	46	17	12	17	72	80	0.900	46	
15	Workington	46	17	12	17	58	69	0.841	46	
16	Shrewsbury Town	46	15	12	19	76	84	0.905	42	
17	Exeter City	46	12	17	17	51	52	0.981	41	
18	Scunthorpe United	46	14	12	20	65	72	0.903	40	
19	Walsall	46	15	7	24	55	80	0.688	37	
20	Oldham Athletic	46	13	10	23	61	83	0.735	36	
21	Luton Town (R)	46	11	11	24	51	94	0.543	33	Relegation to the Fourth Division
22	Port Vale (R)	46	9	14	23	41	76	0.539	32	Relegation to the Fourth Division
23	Colchester United (R)	46	10	10	26	50	89	0.562	30	Relegation to the Fourth Division
24	Barnsley (R)	46	9	11	26	54	90	0.600	29	Relegation to the Fourth Division

(C) Champions; (P) Promoted; (R) Relegated

=== Results ===
Home \ Away	BAR	B&BA	BRE	BRI	BRR	CRL	COL	EXE	GIL	GRI	HUL	LUT	MAN	OLD	PET	PTV	QPR	REA	SCU	SHR	STD	WAL	WAT	WRK
Barnsley		2–2	3–1	1–2	0–2	1–2	1–2	0–0	1–0	1–0	1–1	3–0	2–3	0–1	3–2	0–2	0–0	1–1	2–0	6–2	1–4	0–1	4–0	0–3
Bournemouth & Boscombe Athletic	1–0		0–1	1–2	1–1	0–4	3–1	2–2	1–2	1–2	2–3	4–0	2–0	0–0	0–1	3–0	2–0	3–2	2–1	2–1	2–1	4–0	0–0	4–0
Brentford	1–0	2–1		2–1	1–1	6–1	1–0	2–1	2–0	2–0	1–3	2–2	1–0	2–2	3–1	4–0	5–2	2–1	4–0	2–0	2–1	0–0	5–1	3–0
Bristol City	5–1	0–0	3–2		2–1	1–2	1–1	1–1	1–2	4–0	1–2	1–0	1–1	2–0	3–1	3–0	2–0	2–0	2–2	3–0	4–0	5–1	1–1	5–0
Bristol Rovers	1–0	4–2	1–2	1–1		5–2	2–2	1–1	3–0	5–3	1–1	3–2	4–1	0–0	4–0	4–0	3–1	1–0	2–0	0–0	2–2	0–1	1–0	4–0
Carlisle United	4–0	3–4	0–1	1–1	1–2		4–1	2–1	3–1	3–1	0–0	1–1	3–0	2–0	2–1	1–1	2–0	1–2	3–1	2–1	4–3	2–1	1–1	1–0
Colchester United	4–1	4–3	0–3	2–3	1–1	0–1		1–1	2–1	0–1	1–2	0–1	0–1	2–2	0–1	2–0	1–2	2–2	2–1	0–4	3–1	2–1	0–0	1–1
Exeter City	3–0	1–3	0–0	0–1	0–1	0–0	2–0		1–1	4–1	0–2	5–1	2–3	2–1	4–2	2–1	2–2	2–2	1–3	0–1	1–1	0–1	1–0	0–0
Gillingham	1–0	1–1	1–0	2–0	1–3	1–0	2–1	0–1		0–0	1–0	5–0	0–0	2–1	2–0	2–0	2–2	2–1	0–0	5–0	1–0	4–0	5–2	5–1
Grimsby Town	3–2	2–2	2–1	0–2	1–1	1–1	2–0	2–1	1–1		3–0	2–2	1–1	3–1	2–0	2–0	0–0	1–1	3–0	2–2	1–0	2–2	1–0	0–1
Hull City	7–0	2–1	2–1	3–2	3–2	1–0	5–1	3–1	1–1	3–3		3–1	1–1	2–1	0–2	4–0	3–1	1–0	1–2	1–2	0–0	2–0	1–1	2–2
Luton Town	5–1	0–1	4–2	0–0	0–2	1–1	3–1	1–2	0–2	1–1	1–3		1–1	2–0	1–1	1–1	2–0	3–1	1–1	2–7	0–1	1–3	2–4	0–0
Mansfield Town	4–3	0–0	4–1	3–0	3–0	2–0	0–1	2–1	3–1	2–2	2–1	2–0		4–1	0–0	2–2	8–1	2–1	3–2	1–0	6–1	2–0	3–0	3–5
Oldham Athletic	1–1	1–1	1–1	7–3	1–2	2–3	3–1	2–0	2–0	1–5	2–1	0–2	2–1		3–1	0–1	5–3	1–2	2–1	1–3	0–2	1–3	2–0	0–2
Peterborough United	4–1	4–3	3–1	0–1	3–1	1–2	4–1	0–0	1–0	3–1	2–1	2–0	4–5	5–0		2–2	6–1	2–1	2–2	4–1	4–2	3–2	2–1	0–4
Port Vale	2–0	1–2	2–1	1–2	1–1	1–3	1–2	0–1	0–4	2–3	0–3	1–0	2–2	2–1	0–1		0–0	2–0	0–1	1–1	2–2	2–1	2–2	2–0
Queens Park Rangers	3–2	1–1	1–3	1–0	3–1	1–2	5–0	0–0	3–1	1–1	2–1	7–1	2–0	1–1	3–2	3–1		0–1	2–1	2–1	2–0	1–0	2–2	2–1
Reading	1–1	1–0	1–1	1–1	1–1	1–2	1–1	2–2	3–0	2–0	3–3	1–2	2–1	1–0	4–2	1–1	5–3		2–0	3–1	2–0	0–2	6–2	1–0
Scunthorpe United	2–3	3–1	2–0	5–2	1–1	0–1	0–0	0–0	2–3	2–1	1–1	8–1	0–1	1–1	2–3	0–0	2–1	1–1		3–2	2–1	4–0	0–2	1–1
Shrewsbury Town	3–3	1–2	1–0	1–5	2–1	2–2	3–0	1–0	2–0	1–3	0–4	0–2	1–1	1–3	1–1	0–0	3–2	4–0	3–2		1–3	3–1	2–2	6–1
Southend United	2–0	2–1	0–1	0–4	6–3	1–0	6–3	0–0	3–1	4–0	2–1	5–0	1–4	6–1	2–0	2–1	0–0	2–2	0–1	1–0		0–0	0–1	3–0
Walsall	1–1	0–1	4–3	2–4	2–0	1–0	2–1	2–1	0–1	1–0	3–3	0–1	2–1	1–2	0–1	0–0	4–1	4–1	1–2	1–1	2–3		0–4	1–4
Watford	1–1	2–0	1–1	2–2	1–1	0–0	3–0	1–0	1–2	1–1	2–1	2–0	3–1	3–2	1–1	1–0	0–2	5–1	5–0	2–2	2–1	3–0		3–2
Workington	0–0	2–0	1–1	1–0	2–1	0–1	1–0	0–1	1–1	2–2	1–3	1–0	1–5	0–0	1–0	4–1	0–0	0–2	2–0	2–2	3–1	3–1	2–0	

Updated to match(es) played on unknown. Source: Ian Laschke: Rothmans Book of Football League Records 1888–89 to 1978–79. Macdonald and Jane’s, London & Sydney, 1980.
Legend: Blue = home team win; Yellow = draw; Red = away team win.

=== Maps ===
Locations of the London-based Third Division teams
Locations of the Third Division teams

== Fourth Division ==
Football League Fourth Division
- Season: 1964–65
- Champions: Brighton & Hove Albion (1st title)
- Promoted: Millwall; Oxford United; York City
- Failed re-election: none
- Matches: 552
- Goals: 1,820 (3.3 per match)
- Top goalscorer: Alick Jeffrey (Doncaster Rovers), 36

Pos	Team	Pld	W	D	L	GF	GA	GAv	Pts	Promotion or relegation
1	Brighton & Hove Albion (C, P)	46	26	11	9	102	57	1.789	63	Promotion to the Third Division
2	Millwall (P)	46	23	16	7	78	45	1.733	62	Promotion to the Third Division
3	York City (P)	46	28	6	12	91	56	1.625	62	Promotion to the Third Division
4	Oxford United (P)	46	23	15	8	87	44	1.977	61	Promotion to the Third Division
5	Tranmere Rovers	46	27	6	13	99	56	1.768	60	
6	Rochdale	46	22	14	10	74	53	1.396	58	
7	Bradford (Park Avenue)	46	20	17	9	86	62	1.387	57	
8	Chester	46	25	6	15	119	81	1.469	56	
9	Doncaster Rovers	46	20	11	15	84	72	1.167	51	
10	Crewe Alexandra	46	18	13	15	90	81	1.111	49	
11	Torquay United	46	21	7	18	70	70	1.000	49	
12	Chesterfield	46	20	8	18	58	70	0.829	48	
13	Notts County	46	15	14	17	61	73	0.836	44	
14	Wrexham	46	17	9	20	84	92	0.913	43	
15	Hartlepools United	46	15	13	18	61	85	0.718	43	
16	Newport County	46	17	8	21	85	81	1.049	42	
17	Darlington	46	18	6	22	84	87	0.966	42	
18	Aldershot	46	15	7	24	64	84	0.762	37	
19	Bradford City	46	12	8	26	70	88	0.795	32	
20	Southport	46	8	16	22	58	89	0.652	32	
21	Barrow	46	12	6	28	59	105	0.562	30	Re-elected
22	Lincoln City	46	11	6	29	58	99	0.586	28	Re-elected
23	Halifax Town	46	11	6	29	54	103	0.524	28	Re-elected
24	Stockport County	46	10	7	29	44	87	0.506	27	Re-elected

Source: rsssf.com
(C) Champions; (P) Promoted

=== Results ===
Home \ Away	ALD	BRW	BRA	BPA	B&HA	CHE	CHF	CRE	DAR	DON	HAL	HAR	LIN	MIL	NPC	NTC	OXF	ROC	SOU	STP	TOR	TRA	WRE	YOR
Aldershot		2–1	1–1	1–1	0–2	3–1	2–0	5–2	0–1	3–0	2–0	3–0	3–2	0–0	2–1	1–2	4–1	1–2	0–3	2–0	2–5	3–0	5–0	1–0
Barrow	2–0		1–0	2–1	1–4	2–1	1–2	1–2	3–1	1–2	1–0	4–2	2–2	0–5	1–4	2–0	1–1	2–2	1–1	0–1	2–1	0–2	0–2	0–2
Bradford City	2–0	1–3		0–2	4–1	1–3	0–0	5–2	2–3	0–3	3–1	4–0	0–1	1–2	1–0	0–2	2–1	0–2	2–1	1–1	2–3	1–2	4–1	1–2
Bradford Park Avenue	3–1	3–2	3–3		2–0	3–1	1–0	2–3	3–1	5–2	5–1	4–0	3–1	4–0	2–2	2–2	1–0	0–0	0–0	1–0	4–2	1–1	0–0	0–0
Brighton & Hove Albion	2–0	3–1	3–3	2–2		4–4	5–0	3–1	3–1	1–1	2–1	5–0	4–0	2–0	1–0	6–0	0–0	3–0	3–1	3–1	3–1	2–1	5–1	3–1
Chester	6–2	4–1	3–1	3–0	3–1		4–0	2–2	4–5	3–0	1–0	4–0	5–1	3–1	4–3	4–1	2–1	0–1	3–1	4–0	0–1	3–2	6–1	4–1
Chesterfield	0–1	2–0	3–1	2–4	1–1	1–3		2–1	3–0	1–0	3–0	3–1	1–0	2–3	2–1	0–0	2–1	1–1	1–2	2–0	2–1	1–0	0–0	1–1
Crewe Alexandra	4–1	6–2	2–1	1–1	3–2	5–1	0–2		1–2	4–4	2–2	2–3	5–0	1–1	1–1	2–1	2–2	1–1	4–1	3–2	2–0	1–1	1–0	2–3
Darlington	4–1	1–2	3–1	1–2	2–0	2–0	2–2	0–2		2–2	5–1	2–3	3–1	1–3	0–1	5–1	2–0	2–0	3–2	3–2	1–2	2–1	5–1	1–0
Doncaster Rovers	1–0	4–2	0–0	1–1	2–1	1–4	2–0	3–1	6–3		4–0	0–1	1–2	4–0	1–0	0–0	2–2	2–2	1–2	3–0	2–0	1–0	1–1	4–3
Halifax Town	3–3	3–2	0–3	2–3	1–1	3–4	2–1	2–0	4–0	2–4		2–1	2–1	1–2	2–0	1–1	1–3	1–2	2–1	0–1	0–1	0–1	2–1	1–1
Hartlepools United	1–1	3–0	2–2	2–0	1–1	1–1	1–1	2–4	4–3	1–1	4–0		3–0	1–0	2–4	2–2	1–1	1–1	2–1	4–3	1–0	2–0	1–0	2–2
Lincoln City	3–1	1–0	0–2	2–2	0–1	2–2	0–2	1–2	2–0	0–2	2–3	4–2		2–2	4–3	1–0	0–2	1–1	3–0	6–0	0–1	1–2	0–2	0–1
Millwall	5–0	3–1	3–0	1–0	2–0	1–0	4–2	0–0	1–1	1–1	5–1	0–0	2–1		4–0	4–1	2–2	0–0	0–0	1–0	2–2	1–0	2–2	1–1
Newport County	2–1	2–2	4–2	4–3	1–1	0–1	4–1	2–2	2–1	1–0	0–2	2–0	7–0	2–2		3–1	0–3	2–3	5–0	2–0	4–0	1–1	2–0	2–0
Notts County	0–0	4–1	1–0	3–3	1–2	1–1	5–1	2–0	4–2	5–2	4–0	1–0	2–1	1–2	1–0		0–0	0–0	0–0	2–0	0–0	2–4	1–3	3–1
Oxford United	0–0	7–0	3–1	3–0	2–2	3–2	1–0	4–2	1–0	1–0	1–0	3–0	2–0	0–2	4–1	4–0		2–2	1–1	2–0	3–0	1–0	4–0	2–0
Rochdale	3–1	3–0	3–1	4–3	2–2	2–1	1–2	1–0	1–1	2–1	3–0	3–0	2–0	0–2	2–0	1–1	3–3		2–0	4–0	1–0	0–1	2–1	1–2
Southport	3–1	0–4	0–4	1–1	1–2	2–2	1–0	2–3	3–3	3–5	5–2	1–1	4–4	0–0	5–3	0–0	0–3	1–0		1–1	0–1	2–2	0–2	0–1
Stockport County	2–1	1–0	2–0	0–2	1–4	4–5	0–1	1–1	0–0	2–0	2–0	0–1	3–1	1–4	2–0	0–1	0–0	1–2	2–2		0–2	2–3	3–2	1–2
Torquay United	5–2	6–2	2–2	1–1	0–1	3–2	0–2	0–1	2–0	2–4	2–0	2–1	0–2	0–0	2–2	2–1	1–1	2–1	2–0	1–0		2–1	3–4	1–3
Tranmere Rovers	3–1	3–0	5–1	0–0	4–2	4–1	4–0	1–0	2–1	3–0	5–2	5–1	4–0	1–0	3–2	4–0	2–4	4–1	3–1	1–1	3–1		6–0	2–1
Wrexham	4–0	3–3	3–2	4–1	1–2	4–2	1–2	3–3	4–2	0–2	1–1	3–0	5–3	0–1	4–2	4–0	1–1	2–3	1–1	4–1	2–3	3–2		2–0
York City	1–0	2–0	5–2	0–1	2–1	3–2	7–1	3–1	2–1	4–2	4–0	0–0	3–0	3–1	5–1	2–1	2–1	2–1	3–2	3–0	1–2	4–0	2–1	

Updated to match(es) played on unknown. Source: Ian Laschke: Rothmans Book of Football League Records 1888–89 to 1978–79. Macdonald and Jane’s, London & Sydney, 1980.
Legend: Blue = home team win; Yellow = draw; Red = away team win.

=== Maps ===
Locations of the Fourth Division teams

== Attendances ==
=== Division One ===
No.	Club	Average	±	Highest	Lowest
1	Manchester United	46,521	5,4%	57,662	25,938
2	Everton FC	42,062	-14,9%	65,402	27,533
3	Liverpool FC	41,138	-8,6%	52,619	28,465
4	Sunderland AFC	40,637	-1,5%	52,177	22,467
5	Tottenham Hotspur FC	39,391	-10,1%	58,639	24,019
6	Leeds United FC	37,490	25,2%	52,368	27,339
7	Chelsea FC	37,054	18,4%	62,587	20,952
8	Arsenal FC	31,327	-9,9%	59,637	16,048
9	Nottingham Forest FC	27,426	21,9%	43,009	16,595
10	West Ham United FC	25,858	5,2%	37,298	20,515
11	Stoke City FC	25,787	-14,9%	44,015	12,923
12	Aston Villa FC	22,215	-0,6%	36,871	14,433
13	Wolverhampton Wanderers FC	21,499	-4,8%	30,829	13,839
14	Sheffield Wednesday FC	20,188	-13,7%	39,234	11,526
15	Sheffield United FC	20,006	-7,6%	37,295	11,850
16	Leicester City FC	19,963	-17,3%	32,373	8,817
17	Birmingham City FC	19,714	-10,6%	33,833	8,877
18	West Bromwich Albion FC	18,848	-8,3%	28,126	11,551
19	Blackpool FC	18,637	12,7%	31,855	10,160
20	Fulham FC	17,563	-17,0%	36,291	10,162
21	Blackburn Rovers FC	16,110	-25,2%	29,363	8,990
22	Burnley FC	15,739	-20,3%	31,056	9,971

=== Division Two ===
No.	Club	Average	±	Highest	Lowest
1	Newcastle United FC	35,659	21,2%	59,960	24,531
2	Coventry City FC	26,621	2,3%	38,278	18,800
3	Crystal Palace FC	18,232	6,0%	29,878	12,175
4	Norwich City FC	18,207	11,7%	25,199	10,847
5	Southampton FC	17,123	-0,5%	23,911	11,377
6	Middlesbrough FC	15,692	-16,5%	38,194	8,627
7	Preston North End FC	15,622	-17,0%	23,303	11,390
8	Northampton Town FC	15,366	21,0%	20,660	9,586
9	Swindon Town FC	15,268	-17,5%	19,513	11,180
10	Plymouth Argyle FC	14,881	14,5%	21,876	8,328
11	Manchester City FC	14,753	-18,9%	22,299	8,015
12	Bolton Wanderers FC	14,650	-13,9%	24,487	6,498
13	Derby County FC	13,820	15,4%	32,803	7,457
14	Ipswich Town FC	13,428	-16,1%	25,863	9,118
15	Charlton Athletic FC	13,065	-28,5%	31,498	7,710
16	Portsmouth FC	13,063	-11,0%	25,031	7,920
17	Cardiff City FC	10,588	-23,2%	16,911	7,427
18	Swansea City AFC	10,467	-4,1%	17,875	7,574
19	Rotherham United FC	9,753	-2,1%	14,755	5,552
20	Huddersfield Town AFC	9,644	-20,4%	14,405	5,533
21	Leyton Orient FC	8,920	-13,9%	17,711	5,083
22	Bury FC	7,784	-4,7%	23,321	4,292

=== Division Three ===
No.	Club	Average	±	Highest	Lowest
1	Hull City AFC	14,629	71,4%	28,399	6,165
2	Bristol Rovers FC	13,128	22,6%	25,370	5,578
3	Bristol City FC	12,198	23,1%	28,248	8,387
4	Gillingham FC	11,323	14,4%	15,552	6,077
5	Carlisle United FC	10,794	29,3%	18,764	5,747
6	Brentford FC	10,740	-9,6%	16,065	6,164
7	Peterborough United FC	10,021	-7,4%	14,420	6,262
8	Mansfield Town FC	9,451	-0,3%	19,500	4,783
9	Oldham Athletic FC	8,184	-33,9%	13,366	4,655
10	AFC Bournemouth	7,748	-21,2%	12,122	4,663
11	Reading FC	7,533	-10,7%	12,296	5,059
12	Watford FC	7,416	-35,2%	9,586	5,329
13	Southend United FC	7,157	-15,6%	11,023	4,968
14	Grimsby Town FC	7,144	-24,9%	11,302	4,191
15	Walsall FC	6,754	-7,6%	12,097	3,681
16	Luton Town FC	6,663	-7,3%	11,649	2,874
17	Exeter City FC	6,460	-11,4%	10,138	4,686
18	Queens Park Rangers FC	5,670	-26,0%	11,063	3,260
19	Shrewsbury Town FC	5,635	-14,6%	8,317	3,053
20	Scunthorpe United FC	5,618	-23,6%	10,867	2,755
21	Port Vale FC	5,508	-45,2%	8,190	3,071
22	Workington AFC	5,178	7,4%	11,953	2,274
23	Barnsley FC	4,274	-34,0%	6,940	2,297
24	Colchester United FC	3,655	-27,4%	6,074	2,528

=== Division Four ===
No.	Club	Average	±	Highest	Lowest
1	Brighton & Hove Albion FC	17,907	92,2%	31,461	12,267
2	Tranmere Rovers	11,656	64,8%	17,430	6,340
3	Millwall FC	9,272	-11,7%	15,389	6,324
4	Oxford United FC	8,749	26,9%	13,499	5,296
5	Doncaster Rovers FC	8,570	34,5%	14,402	4,399
6	Bradford Park Avenue AFC	8,366	39,4%	13,745	5,721
7	Chester City FC	7,659	23,9%	14,782	5,152
8	York City FC	7,185	82,5%	13,444	3,752
9	Chesterfield FC	6,131	14,3%	9,926	3,806
10	Hartlepool United FC	5,884	41,1%	10,734	3,102
11	Wrexham AFC	5,842	-16,8%	14,690	1,616
12	Notts County FC	5,756	-10,4%	10,729	3,219
13	Stockport County FC	5,739	34,2%	10,334	3,083
14	Rochdale AFC	4,686	55,2%	8,031	2,882
15	Aldershot Town FC	4,648	-11,9%	8,032	2,948
16	Lincoln City FC	4,475	-20,8%	6,578	2,408
17	Torquay United FC	4,385	-15,6%	6,388	3,245
18	Darlington FC	4,292	27,3%	6,083	2,290
19	Crewe Alexandra FC	4,263	-22,5%	7,313	1,988
20	Newport County AFC	4,010	7,9%	6,730	2,057
21	Bradford City AFC	3,784	-34,1%	9,436	2,091
22	Barrow AFC	3,200	5,3%	5,403	1,781
23	Halifax Town AFC	3,006	-20,9%	7,319	1,240
24	Southport FC	2,870	-3,1%	7,434	1,320

== See also ==
- 1964–65 in English football
