= 1964–65 in English football =

Football in England
- Season: 1964–65

Men's football
- First Division: Manchester United
- Second Division: Newcastle United
- Third Division: Carlisle United
- Fourth Division: Brighton & Hove Albion
- FA Cup: Liverpool
- League Cup: Chelsea
- Charity Shield: Shared between Liverpool and West Ham United

The 1964–65 season was the 85th season of competitive football in England.

== Overview ==
- After a three-way tussle for the League title between Manchester United, Leeds United and Chelsea, Manchester United came out on top and were crowned champions.
- Liverpool won the FA Cup, beating Leeds United 2–1 in the final.
- Chelsea won the League Cup, beating Leicester City 3–2 in the two-legged final.
- West Ham United won the European Cup Winners' Cup, beating 1860 Munich 2–0 in the final at Wembley Stadium.
- BBC TV's Match of the Day launched at the start of this season.
- This was Stanley Matthews's final season as a player.

== Diary of the season ==
21 July 1964: John White, 27-year-old Tottenham Hotspur and Scotland forward, is killed on a North London golf course while sheltering under a tree which was struck by lightning.

22 August 1964: The first edition of BBC TV's Match of the Day is broadcast, featuring highlights of Liverpool v Arsenal at Anfield.

15 September 1964: Stan Cullis, one of the longest serving managers in the Football League, is sacked after 16 years in charge of Wolverhampton Wanderers. He had won three league titles and two FA Cups with them, but recent form has been dismal for the Black Country side whose attendances have now fallen below 15,000 and relegation appears to a real threat to the club.

19 September 1964: Reigning champions Liverpool lose heavily at home in the Merseyside Derby to Everton 4-0 putting them 2nd from bottom of the league.

2 November 1964: Wolves, marooned at the foot of the First Division, appoint former Scotland manager Andy Beattie as their caretaker manager.

6 February 1965: Stanley Matthews plays the final competitive game of his 35-year career for Stoke City against Fulham in the First Division, shortly after his 50th birthday.

15 March 1965: Chelsea defeat Leicester City 3–2 at Stamford Bridge in the first leg of the Football League Cup final.

15 April 1965: A goalless draw in the second leg of the Football League Cup final at Filbert Street gives the trophy to Chelsea.

28 April 1965: Despite losing 2–1 at Aston Villa on the final day of the league season, Manchester United are crowned First Division champions for the sixth time in their history (and the first time since 1957) on goal average ahead of a Leeds United side who have yet to win the top division title.

1 May 1965: Liverpool win the FA Cup for the first time in their history, defeating Leeds United 2–1 in the final at Wembley Stadium.

19 May 1965: West Ham United win the European Cup Winners' Cup at Wembley Stadium with a 2–0 win over 1860 Munich of West Germany in the final.

== Notable debuts ==
8 September 1964: Pat Dunne, 21-year-old Irish goalkeeper, makes his debut for Manchester United in 3–3 league draw with Everton at Goodison Park.

19 December 1964: Ralph Coates, 18-year-old winger, makes his debut for Burnley in a 3–1 home league win over Sheffield United.

== Notable retirements ==
Jimmy Dickinson, 40, Portsmouth centre-half and all-time leading appearance maker for Pompey with a total of 813 games; he also played 48 times for England.

Arthur Rowley, 39, Shrewsbury Town centre-forward and all-time leading Football League goalscorer with a total of 434 goals; he also played for Fulham, West Bromwich Albion and Leicester City.

== Deaths ==
21 July 1964 – John White, 27, Tottenham Hotspur and Scotland forward, was killed on a North London golf course when the tree he was sheltering under was struck by lightning. His goals helped them win the double in 1961, another FA Cup in 1962 and the European Cup Winners' Cup in 1963.

== Honours ==
Competition	Winner	Runner-up
First Division	Manchester United (6)	Leeds United
Second Division	Newcastle United	Northampton Town
Third Division	Carlisle United	Bristol City
Fourth Division	Brighton & Hove Albion	Millwall
FA Cup	Liverpool (1)	Leeds United
League Cup	Chelsea (1)	Leicester City
Charity Shield	Liverpool and West Ham United (shared)	
Home Championship	England	

Notes = Number in parentheses is the times that club has won that honour. * indicates new record for competition

== Football League ==
=== First Division ===
Manchester United clinched their sixth First Division title, with teenage Northern Irish winger George Best excelling in a front-line already dominated by Bobby Charlton, Denis Law and David Herd. They finished champions ahead of newly promoted Leeds United on goal average, after Leeds failed to beat already relegated Birmingham in their final league game of the season on the Monday before the Cup Final. Third placed Chelsea won the League Cup, 1963 champions Everton finished fourth, and Nottingham Forest completed the top five.

Birmingham City went down in bottom place, while Wolves were relegated to the Second Division for the first time in the postwar era following the dismissal of long-serving manager Stan Cullis.

Pos	Team	Pld	W	D	L	GF	GA	GAv	Pts	Qualification or relegation
1	Manchester United (C)	42	26	9	7	89	39	2.282	61	Qualification for the European Cup preliminary round
2	Leeds United	42	26	9	7	83	52	1.596	61	Qualification for the Inter-Cities Fairs Cup first round
3	Chelsea	42	24	8	10	89	54	1.648	56	Qualification for the Inter-Cities Fairs Cup first round
4	Everton	42	17	15	10	69	60	1.150	49	Qualification for the Inter-Cities Fairs Cup first round
5	Nottingham Forest	42	17	13	12	71	67	1.060	47	
6	Tottenham Hotspur	42	19	7	16	87	71	1.225	45	
7	Liverpool	42	17	10	15	67	73	0.918	44	Qualification for the European Cup Winners' Cup first round (Note: Liverpool qualified for the European Cup Winners' Cup as the 1964–65 FA Cup winners.)
8	Sheffield Wednesday	42	16	11	15	57	55	1.036	43	
9	West Ham United	42	19	4	19	82	71	1.155	42	Qualification for the European Cup Winners' Cup first round (Note: West Ham United qualified for the European Cup Winners' Cup as the Cup Winners' Cup winners.)
10	Blackburn Rovers	42	16	10	16	83	79	1.051	42	
11	Stoke City	42	16	10	16	67	66	1.015	42	
12	Burnley	42	16	10	16	70	70	1.000	42	
13	Arsenal	42	17	7	18	69	75	0.920	41	
14	West Bromwich Albion	42	13	13	16	70	65	1.077	39	
15	Sunderland	42	14	9	19	64	74	0.865	37	
16	Aston Villa	42	16	5	21	57	82	0.695	37	
17	Blackpool	42	12	11	19	67	78	0.859	35	
18	Leicester City	42	11	13	18	69	85	0.812	35	
19	Sheffield United	42	12	11	19	50	64	0.781	35	
20	Fulham	42	11	12	19	60	78	0.769	34	
21	Wolverhampton Wanderers (R)	42	13	4	25	59	89	0.663	30	Relegation to the Second Division
22	Birmingham City (R)	42	8	11	23	64	96	0.667	27	Relegation to the Second Division

Source: World Football
Rules for classification: 1) Points; 2) Goal average; 3) Goals scored
(C) Champions; (R) Relegated

=== Second Division ===
Newcastle United returned to the First Division after four years away as Second Division champions, and were joined in the elite by runners-up Northampton Town, who had started the decade in the Fourth Division.

Manchester City endured one of the worst seasons of their history by finishing 11th and extending their top flight exile into its third season.

Swansea Town and Swindon Town fell into the Third Division.

Pos	Team	Pld	W	D	L	GF	GA	GAv	Pts	Qualification or relegation
1	Newcastle United (C, P)	42	24	9	9	81	45	1.800	57	Promotion to the First Division
2	Northampton Town (P)	42	20	16	6	66	50	1.320	56	Promotion to the First Division
3	Bolton Wanderers	42	20	10	12	80	58	1.379	50	
4	Southampton	42	17	14	11	83	63	1.317	48	
5	Ipswich Town	42	15	17	10	74	67	1.104	47	
6	Norwich City	42	20	7	15	61	57	1.070	47	
7	Crystal Palace	42	16	13	13	55	51	1.078	45	
8	Huddersfield Town	42	17	10	15	53	51	1.039	44	
9	Derby County	42	16	11	15	84	79	1.063	43	
10	Coventry City	42	17	9	16	72	70	1.029	43	
11	Manchester City	42	16	9	17	63	62	1.016	41	
12	Preston North End	42	14	13	15	76	81	0.938	41	
13	Cardiff City	42	13	14	15	64	57	1.123	40	Qualification for the European Cup Winners' Cup first round (Note: Cardiff City qualified for the European Cup Winners' Cup as the 1964–65 Welsh Cup winners.)
14	Rotherham United	42	14	12	16	70	69	1.014	40	
15	Plymouth Argyle	42	16	8	18	63	79	0.797	40	
16	Bury	42	14	10	18	60	66	0.909	38	
17	Middlesbrough	42	13	9	20	70	76	0.921	35	
18	Charlton Athletic	42	13	9	20	64	75	0.853	35	
19	Leyton Orient	42	12	11	19	50	72	0.694	35	
20	Portsmouth	42	12	10	20	56	77	0.727	34	
21	Swindon Town (R)	42	14	5	23	63	81	0.778	33	Relegation to the Third Division
22	Swansea Town (R)	42	11	10	21	62	84	0.738	32	Relegation to the Third Division

Rules for classification: 1) Points; 2) Goal average; 3) Goals scored
(C) Champions; (P) Promoted; (R) Relegated

=== Third Division ===
Carlisle United won a second successive promotion and lifted the Third Division championship trophy. They finished a point ahead of runners-up Bristol City, who claimed promotion on goal average ahead of Mansfield Town. Hull City and Brentford missed out on promotion by a slightly wider margin.

Barnsley, Colchester United, Port Vale and Luton Town were relegated to the Fourth Division – completing a six-season fall from the First Division for Luton Town, who had been FA Cup finalists in 1959.

Pos	Team	Pld	W	D	L	GF	GA	GAv	Pts	Promotion or relegation
1	Carlisle United (C, P)	46	25	10	11	76	53	1.434	60	Promotion to the Second Division
2	Bristol City (P)	46	24	11	11	92	55	1.673	59	Promotion to the Second Division
3	Mansfield Town	46	24	11	11	95	61	1.557	59	
4	Hull City	46	23	12	11	91	57	1.596	58	
5	Brentford	46	24	9	13	83	55	1.509	57	
6	Bristol Rovers	46	20	15	11	82	58	1.414	55	
7	Gillingham	46	23	9	14	70	50	1.400	55	
8	Peterborough United	46	22	7	17	85	74	1.149	51	
9	Watford	46	17	16	13	71	64	1.109	50	
10	Grimsby Town	46	16	17	13	68	67	1.015	49	
11	Bournemouth & Boscombe Athletic	46	18	11	17	72	63	1.143	47	
12	Southend United	46	19	8	19	78	71	1.099	46	
13	Reading	46	16	14	16	70	70	1.000	46	
14	Queens Park Rangers	46	17	12	17	72	80	0.900	46	
15	Workington	46	17	12	17	58	69	0.841	46	
16	Shrewsbury Town	46	15	12	19	76	84	0.905	42	
17	Exeter City	46	12	17	17	51	52	0.981	41	
18	Scunthorpe United	46	14	12	20	65	72	0.903	40	
19	Walsall	46	15	7	24	55	80	0.688	37	
20	Oldham Athletic	46	13	10	23	61	83	0.735	36	
21	Luton Town (R)	46	11	11	24	51	94	0.543	33	Relegation to the Fourth Division
22	Port Vale (R)	46	9	14	23	41	76	0.539	32	Relegation to the Fourth Division
23	Colchester United (R)	46	10	10	26	50	89	0.562	30	Relegation to the Fourth Division
24	Barnsley (R)	46	9	11	26	54	90	0.600	29	Relegation to the Fourth Division

(C) Champions; (P) Promoted; (R) Relegated

=== Fourth Division ===
Brighton sealed promotion to the Third Division as Fourth Division champions. They were joined by Millwall, York City, and the league's newest members Oxford United.

Pos	Team	Pld	W	D	L	GF	GA	GAv	Pts	Promotion or relegation
1	Brighton & Hove Albion (C, P)	46	26	11	9	102	57	1.789	63	Promotion to the Third Division
2	Millwall (P)	46	23	16	7	78	45	1.733	62	Promotion to the Third Division
3	York City (P)	46	28	6	12	91	56	1.625	62	Promotion to the Third Division
4	Oxford United (P)	46	23	15	8	87	44	1.977	61	Promotion to the Third Division
5	Tranmere Rovers	46	27	6	13	99	56	1.768	60	
6	Rochdale	46	22	14	10	74	53	1.396	58	
7	Bradford (Park Avenue)	46	20	17	9	86	62	1.387	57	
8	Chester	46	25	6	15	119	81	1.469	56	
9	Doncaster Rovers	46	20	11	15	84	72	1.167	51	
10	Crewe Alexandra	46	18	13	15	90	81	1.111	49	
11	Torquay United	46	21	7	18	70	70	1.000	49	
12	Chesterfield	46	20	8	18	58	70	0.829	48	
13	Notts County	46	15	14	17	61	73	0.836	44	
14	Wrexham	46	17	9	20	84	92	0.913	43	
15	Hartlepools United	46	15	13	18	61	85	0.718	43	
16	Newport County	46	17	8	21	85	81	1.049	42	
17	Darlington	46	18	6	22	84	87	0.966	42	
18	Aldershot	46	15	7	24	64	84	0.762	37	
19	Bradford City	46	12	8	26	70	88	0.795	32	
20	Southport	46	8	16	22	58	89	0.652	32	
21	Barrow	46	12	6	28	59	105	0.562	30	Re-elected
22	Lincoln City	46	11	6	29	58	99	0.586	28	Re-elected
23	Halifax Town	46	11	6	29	54	103	0.524	28	Re-elected
24	Stockport County	46	10	7	29	44	87	0.506	27	Re-elected

Source: rsssf.com
(C) Champions; (P) Promoted

=== Top goalscorers ===
First Division

- Andy McEvoy (Blackburn Rovers) and Jimmy Greaves (Tottenham Hotspur) – 29 goals

Second Division

- George O'Brien (Southampton) – 34 goals

Third Division

- Ken Wagstaff (Mansfield Town and Hull City) – 35 goals

Fourth Division

- Alick Jeffrey (Doncaster Rovers) – 36 goals
