= Ian Butler (footballer) =

English footballer (born 1944)

Personal information
- Date of birth: 1 February 1944 (age 82)
- Place of birth: Darton, England
- Position: Winger

Youth career
- –1960: Rotherham United

Senior career*
Years	Team	Apps	(Gls)
1960–1965	Rotherham United	102	(27)
1965–1973	Hull City	305	(66)
1973–1975	York City	46	(2)
1975–1976	→ Barnsley (loan)	5	(1)
- Bridlington Town
Total		453	(98)

International career
1962	England Youth		
- * Club domestic league appearances and goals

Ian Butler (born 1 February 1944 in Darton, Barnsley) is an English former professional footballer who played in the Football League as a left winger for Rotherham United, Hull City, York City and Barnsley. His son, Martin Butler, also played for York City.

== Club career ==
Butler began his career at Rotherham United where he established himself down the left wing and played alongside players such as Ken Houghton in a highly promising team with a significant number of locally developed players. Together with Houghton, he moved to Hull City during the 1964–65 season, much to the displeasure of Rotherham's fans. He became part of a formidable attacking line including Ray Henderson, Ken Wagstaff and Chris Chilton, whose performances took Hull City to the Third Division title in 1966 and established the side as a Second Division force in the 1960s and 1970s. He finished his League career with York City and a loan spell at Barnsley.

== International career ==
He was capped by the England national youth team in 1962.

== Honours ==
Hull City

- Third Division: 1965–66
