= Ian Butler =

Ian Butler may refer to:

- Ian Butler (cricketer) (born 1981), New Zealand cricketer
- Ian Butler (footballer) (born 1944), English footballer
- Ian "Rocky" Butler (born 1979), Canadian football player
- Ian Butler, former member of Tempest (Celtic rock band)
