= Martin Butler =

Martin Butler may refer to:

- Martin Butler (footballer, born 1974), English footballer
- Martin Butler (footballer, born 1966), English footballer
- Martin Butler (composer) (born 1960), English musician and composer
- Martin Butler (director), Australian director and producer
