= Maurice Swan =

Irish footballer

Personal information
- Full name: Maurice Michael George Swan
- Date of birth: 27 September 1938 (age 88)
- Place of birth: North Dublin, Ireland
- Position: Goalkeeper

Senior career*
Years	Team	Apps	(Gls)
1953–1960	Drumcondra	49	(0)
1960–1963	Cardiff City	18	(0)
1963–1968	Hull City	117	(0)
1968–1971	Dundalk	48	(0)
1971–1972	Drumcondra	29	(0)
1972	Finn Harps	10	(0)

International career
1960	Republic of Ireland	1	(0)
- * Club domestic league appearances and goals

Maurice Michael George Swan (born 27 September 1938) is an Irish former professional footballer. He was born in Dublin.

== Career ==
Swan was a goalkeeper who first played with Drumcondra in his native city before moving to Cardiff City in 1960. Swan was the youngest player to ever play in the League of Ireland for many years, and at the time of writing, is still the youngest goalkeeper to debut in the League of Ireland, at the age of 15, saving a penalty on his debut.

After Cardiff City, where he played in the old Division 1, he moved to Hull City in 1963 for a fee of £5,000 and had a successful spell there with the highlight being the 1965–66 season as City won the Third Division championship and reached the FA Cup quarter-final. Hull City were defeated by Chelsea after a second-round replay.

After leaving Hull after playing 103 games for them, Swan went back to Ireland to play for Dundalk in 1968.

He won his only international cap for the Republic of Ireland national football team on 18 May 1960 when he replaced Noel Dwyer at half time in a 4–1 defeat to Sweden in Malmö.

Swan also went on to play for Finn Harps before retiring in the early 1970s.

== Personal life ==
Swan is the uncle of footballers Tony McDonnell and Derek Swan.

After his professional playing career ended, Swan started a career in the Irish film industry as an electrician.

Swan is an avid golfer and a fan of West Ham United.

== Honours ==
Hull City

- Third Division: 1965–66
