= Michael Milner =

Michael Milner may refer to:

- Mike Milner (born 1939), English professional footballer
- Michael Milner, 2nd Baron Milner of Leeds (1923–2003), British solicitor and politician
