= Dennis Butler (footballer, born 1943) =

English footballer

Personal information
- Full name: Dennis Michael Butler
- Date of birth: 7 March 1943 (age 83)
- Place of birth: Fulham, London, England
- Height: 5 ft 9 in (1.75 m)
- Positions: Centre-back; right-back

Youth career
- Surrey Boys
- 1958–1961: Chelsea

Senior career*
Years	Team	Apps	(Gls)
1961–1963	Chelsea	18	(0)
1963–1969	Hull City	217	(0)
1969–1974	Reading	169	(0)
1974–1975	Margate		
Total		404	(0)
- * Club domestic league appearances and goals

Dennis Michael Butler (born 7 March 1943) is an English former professional footballer who played as a centre-back.

== Club career ==
Born in Fulham, Butler started his career with Surrey Boys before joining Chelsea, where he won the FA Youth Cup in 1960 and 1961. He made his first-team debut on 18 November 1961, in a 2–2 draw at Manchester City. He went on to make eighteen appearances before moving to Hull City in June 1963. After 217 league appearances, he moved to Reading, where he made 169 league appearances.

After leaving the professional game, Butler moved to non-League side Margate in 1974.

== Coaching career ==
Butler coached at Rochdale and Bury.

== Honours ==
Chelsea

- FA Youth Cup: 1960, 1961

Hull City

- Third Division: 1965–66
