= Listed buildings in Sproatley =

Sproatley is a civil parish in the county of the East Riding of Yorkshire, England. It contains nine listed buildings that are recorded in the National Heritage List for England. All the listed buildings are designated at Grade II, the lowest of the three grades, which is applied to "buildings of national importance and special interest". The parish contains the village of Sproatley and the surrounding area, and the listed buildings consist of a church, a cross base and fragment in the churchyard, houses, a public house, a former police station and courthouse, and a war memorial.

== Buildings ==
Name and location	Photograph	Date	Notes
Cross base and fragment 53.79212°N 0.18755°W		15th century (probable)	The cross base and fragment are in the churchyard of St Swithin's's Church, and were moved from elsewhere in the 1850s. They are in limestone, and the base is cubital, with moulding to the arrises, and sunk shields on the sides. The stump of the shaft is chamfered with mouldings and pyramidal stops.
House opposite the Constable Arms; 53.79449°N 0.19116°W		Mid-18th century	The house is in red brick, it has a pantile roof with raised gables, and is at right angles to the road. There is one storey and an attic, and two bays. The central doorway is flanked by horizontally sliding sash windows under flat brick arches.
Constable Arms Public House; 53.79457°N 0.19163°W		Late 18th century	The public house is rendered and colourwashed, and has a pantile roof with raised coped gables. There are two storeys and two bays, and later rear additions. On the front is a doorway, and sash windows under cambered heads.
Lodge Farmhouse; 53.79764°N 0.19528°W		Late 18th century	The house is in colourwashed brick with a hipped pantile roof. There are two storeys and a square plan, with fronts of three bays. On the front is a doorway, and the windows are sashes.
Scott's House; 53.79178°N 0.19170°W	—	Late 18th century	The house is in red brick with a hipped pantile roof. There are two storeys and three bays. The central doorway has pilasters, and the windows are sashes under channelled wedge lintels with keystones.
The Rise; 53.79058°N 0.19078°W	—	Late 18th century	The house is in brown brick with a hipped slate roof. There are two storeys and three bays. The central doorway has pilasters, a fanlight with radial glazing in panelled reveals, and a dentilled pediment. The windows are sashes under channelled wedge lintels with keystones.
St Swithin's Church; 53.79223°N 0.18781°W		1814–20	The church, which was largely rebuilt in 1885–86, is built in grey brick with stone dressings and a slate roof. It consists of a nave, north and south aisles, a north porch, a chancel with a north vestry, and a west tower. The tower has three stages, a plinth, angle buttresses, chamfered string courses, trefoil-headed lancet windows, clock faces, square-headed bell openings with hood moulds, and an embattled parapet with crocketed corner finials.
Police Station; 53.79587°N 0.18842°W		1849	The former police station and courthouse, designed by H. F. Lockwood, is in grey brick, with stone dressings, a bracketed moulded timber eaves cornice, and a hipped slate roof. The main block has two storeys and three bays, to the left is a recessed single-storey bay with a parapet and a flat roof, and to the right is a recessed two-storey two-bay wing. In the centre is a round arch with an inscription and date in the chamfer, and containing a recessed round-arched doorway. The windows are sashes, on the ground floor of the main block and the left bay with round-arched heads, and elsewhere with flat heads under cambered gauged brick heads.
War memorial 53.79217°N 0.19099°W		c. 1920	The war memorial stands in a triangular area by a road junction. It is in pink sandstone, and consists of a tall circular column surmounted by a cross, on a rectangular stepped base. On each face of the base is a black marble plaque with the names of these who served, and those who were lost, in the First World War. The memorial is enclosed by a low stone wall cast iron spearhead railings, and square corner posts with onion finials.
