= Derek Swan =

Irish footballer

Personal information
- Full name: Derek Anthony Swan
- Date of birth: 24 October 1966 (age 59)
- Place of birth: Dublin, Republic of Ireland
- Position: Forward

Youth career
- Belvedere

Senior career*
Years	Team	Apps	(Gls)
1985–1986	Home Farm	9	(0)
1986–1990	Bohemians	101	(41)
1990	Port Vale	0	(0)
1990	→ Wageningen (loan)	5	(0)
1990–1993	Shamrock Rovers	75	(25)
1993	Dundalk	3	(0)
1993–1994	Glentoran	6	(1)
1994–2000	Bohemians	136	(48)
2000–2002	UCD	16	(4)
Total		353	(119)

International career
1986–1987	Republic of Ireland U21	2	(0)
1989	Republic of Ireland U23	1	(0)
1989	League of Ireland XI	1	(1)
- * Club domestic league appearances and goals

Derek Anthony Swan (born 24 October 1966) is an Irish former footballer who played as a forward. He played for Home Farm, Bohemians, Port Vale, FC Wageningen, Shamrock Rovers, Dundalk, Glentoran and UCD.

== Club career ==
Swan began his career with Home Farm in 1985–86, making his debut against Shamrock Rovers in November 1985. The following season he secured a switch to Bohemians, where he averaged ten league goals a year in four years with the club. In June 1987 he guested for Shamrock Rovers in a tournament in South Korea.

He moved to England with Port Vale in May 1990 for a £15,000 fee. Three months later, he went out on a one-month loan to FC Wageningen. He never made the first team at Vale Park and was sold to Shamrock Rovers for £12,500 in November 1990. He later said that "I was flying and I was scoring regular goals in the reserves (but John Rudge didn't seem to notice) so I just decided to come home really". He scored twice on his Rovers league debut in December 1990. During his three years at the club he scored 25 goals in 75 league appearances and was top club goalscorer in 1991–92 and 1992–93.

In December 1994 he returned to "Bohs" for £2,000. He spent the next six years at Dalymount, including scoring at Helsingin Jalkapalloklubi in a 1995 UEFA Intertoto Cup tie. He also netted in a 1996–97 UEFA Cup tie against FC Dinamo Minsk.

In 2000, he signed for University College Dublin, where his goals helped UCD to avoid relegation as they secured their top-flight status for the following 2001–02 season, with one point to spare.

== International career ==
Swan was capped at schoolboy, youth, under-21 and under-23 level for the Republic of Ireland. He also played for the League of Ireland XI against Al-Ahly.

He played at the 1985 FIFA World Youth Championship.

== Personal life ==
His father played as a goalkeeper for Bohemians and Drogheda and Athlone. His uncle, Maurice Swan, was also a goalkeeper. His cousin, former defender Tony McDonnell, had a 13-year career with UCD. His son, Ryan, is also a footballer; both father and son have played for Bohemian.
