= Alan Jarvis =

Welsh footballer (1943–2019)

Personal information
- Date of birth: 4 August 1943
- Place of birth: Wrexham, Wales
- Date of death: 15 December 2019 (aged 76)
- Place of death: Mold, Wales

Senior career*
Years	Team	Apps	(Gls)
1963–1964	Everton	0	(0)
1964–1970	Hull City	153	(12)
1970–1973	Mansfield Town	12	(0)
Total		165	(12)

International career
1966–1967	Wales	3	(0)
- * Club domestic league appearances and goals

Alan Leslie Jarvis (4 August 1943 – 15 December 2019) was a Welsh international footballer.

== Career ==
He played for Everton, Hull City and Mansfield Town; while at Hull City he played 159 matches for the Tigers between 1964 and 1970, scoring 12 goals. He was part of the promotion-winning Hull City side of season 1965-66.

He was part of the Wales national football team between 1966 and 1967, playing 3 matches. He played his first match on 22 October 1966 against Scotland and his last match on 12 April 1967 against Northern Ireland.

After retiring, he returned to North Wales to work as a quantity surveyor.

== Personal life ==
In 2014, it was revealed that Jarvis was in a care home in North Wales, having been diagnosed with an unknown form of dementia. His daughter was quoted as saying her family believed he was suffering from Chronic traumatic encephalopathy (CTE). He died on 15 December 2019 in Mold, Flintshire at the age of 76.

His family subsequently donated his brain to medical research being undertaken by Dr William Stuart, a consultant neuropathologist based at the University of Glasgow. In May 2020, at the opening of an inquest into his death at Ruthin, a coroner said it could linked to heading a football and be regarded as an "industrial disease". Coroner John Gittins finally concluded that Jarvis died from Alzheimer's disease "caused by his occupation as a footballer, heading heavy footballs".

== Honours ==
Hull City

- Third Division: 1965–66

== See also ==
- List of Wales international footballers (alphabetical)
