= Chris Chilton =

English footballer (1943–2021)

Personal information
- Full name: Christopher Roy Chilton
- Date of birth: 25 June 1943
- Place of birth: Sproatley, England
- Date of death: 20 May 2021 (aged 77)
- Height: 5 ft 11 in (1.80 m)
- Position: Striker

Senior career*
Years	Team	Apps	(Gls)
1960–1971	Hull City	415	(193)
1971–1972	Coventry City	27	(3)
1972–1974	Bridlington Trinity		
1974–1978	Highlands Park		
Total		442	(196)
- * Club domestic league appearances and goals

Christopher Roy Chilton (25 June 1943 – 20 May 2021) was an English professional footballer who played the majority of his career in the Football League for Hull City.

Towards the end of his career, he also had short spells with Coventry City and Bridlington Trinity, as well as four final seasons with Highlands Park in South Africa.

== Playing career ==
=== Hull City ===
Chilton played as an inside forward for Church League side Bilton, but after joining Hull City he played as a centre forward. During Hull's 1965–66 successful Division Two promotion campaign, Chilton scored 29 goals even with the presence of an egg-sized lump of fat behind one knee. He had a successful operation at the end of the season to remove it.

Chilton became renowned for his partnership with fellow striker Ken Wagstaff. Chilton was taller than Wagstaff and unselfish, proving to be the perfect foil to his stockier, more predatory teammate. Neither player was deemed good enough to gain international honours, although both played for an England league XI in representative games.

Despite numerous offers to move to other clubs, notably Tottenham Hotspur and Leeds United, Chilton remained loyal to his local club up until 1971. He is Hull City's all-time top scorer, with 222 goals in all competitions.

=== Later career ===
Chilton's move away from Hull was to Coventry City, which ended after just one season due to a back injury. He then returned to the East Riding of Yorkshire to play for local side Bridlington Trinity for four years. Chilton would then have a spell in South Africa with Highlands Park. After four more years there, he would retire from professional football.

== Managerial career ==
After retirement, he returned to the UK, taking up a variety of coaching positions at his beloved Hull City. He began as the team's youth-team manager and was responsible for the development of future England manager Steve McClaren and England international Brian Marwood, amongst others.

Another achievement was being the mentor of striker Billy Whitehurst, which resulted in the development of Whitehurst's notable hard-man image. Whitehurst was eventually sold for a huge profit, having arrived from non-league football for a nominal fee.

Chilton eventually became assistant first-team manager under Colin Appleton and later Brian Horton. He also had a short spell as caretaker manager following the sacking of Mike Smith. He was however eventually moved back to youth-team coach by Horton, who promoted Dennis Booth in his place.

Chilton would have a final role as assistant manager at Lincoln City, before leaving the game for good.

== Personal life ==
Chilton was born in Sproatley, East Riding of Yorkshire. He published his autobiography 'Chillo' in 2005. During later life, Chilton lived in Thorngumbald, East Riding of Yorkshire.

Chilton later developed dementia, and died on 20 May 2021, aged 77. On 2 March 2022, Hull City announced that the East Stand of their home ground, the MKM Stadium, would be renamed in Chilton's honour.

== Honours ==
=== As a player ===
Hull City

- Football League Third Division: 1965–66

=== As a manager ===
Hull City

- Associate Members' Cup runner-up: 1983–84
