= Chris Simpkin =

English footballer (born 1944)

Personal information
- Full name: Christopher John Simpkin
- Date of birth: 24 April 1944 (age 82)
- Place of birth: Hull, England
- Height: 5 ft 11 1/2 in (1.82 m)
- Position: Midfielder

Senior career*
Years	Team	Apps	(Gls)
1962–1971	Hull City	285	(19)
1971–1973	Blackpool	34	(1)
1973–1975	Scunthorpe United	61	(2)
1975–1976	Huddersfield Town	25	(0)
1975	→ Baltimore Comets (loan)	22	(1)
1976–1978	Hartlepool United	47	(0)
?	Scarborough	?	(?)
Total		474	(23)
- * Club domestic league appearances and goals

Christopher John Simpkin (born 24 April 1944, in Hull) is a former professional footballer who played for Hull City, Blackpool, Scunthorpe United, Huddersfield Town, Hartlepool and Scarborough. He also played one season on loan in the North American Soccer League.

== Honours ==
Hull City

- Third Division: 1965–66
