= Tony McDonnell =

Irish footballer (born 1976)

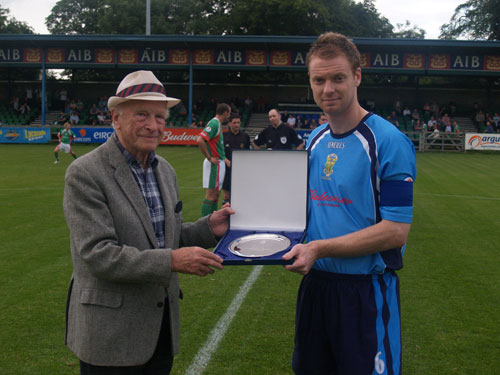
- Tony McDonnell, receiving an award for his 250th UCD appearance

Personal information
- Full name: Anthony McDonnell
- Date of birth: 10 February 1976 (age 50)
- Place of birth: Dublin, Ireland
- Positions: Centre back; central midfielder

Senior career*
| Years | Team | Apps | (Gls) |
| 1994–2007 | UCD AFC | 603 | (28) |
- * Club domestic league appearances and goals

Anthony "Tony" McDonnell (born 10 February 1976, in Dublin) is a retired football player for Irish side, UCD. McDonnell would spend the entirety of his career with UCD, becoming the club's record longest serving player in history.

A former St Kevin's Boys player McDonnell made his League of Ireland debut on 27 March 1994 at Abbeycartron in a 2–1 win over Longford Town.

He went on to represent College until 2007, and is second on the all-time appearances list for the Dublin club as well as the club's sixth highest league goal scorer. He was also the club captain for the best part of a decade. He played as a right- or centre-back, but in later seasons he was deployed as a central midfielder. He made 308 league appearances for UCD, scoring 28 league goals, before deciding to call time on his career on 6 December 2007. The latter period of career was blighted by hamstring injuries, a major factor in his retirement. Asked about this in an interview, he replied that his hamstrings were "[t]ighter than a camels ass in a sand storm. They say all the lightning quick players have trouble with them……so no idea why I do!"

He was a nominee for the League of Ireland player of the year in the 2005 season, and was appointed chairman of the PFAI in August 2006. He has also worked as a pundit on RTÉ's Monday Night Soccer show since retirement and still regularly attends UCD's home games.

His uncle is Maurice Swan and his cousin is Derek Swan.

== Honours ==
=== Club ===
- Leinster Senior Cup (football)
  - UCD 1995/96
- FAI Super Cup
  - UCD 2000/01

=== Individual ===
- League of Ireland Premier Division Player of the Month
  - UCD (March 2006)

== See also ==
- One-club man

Sporting positions
| Preceded by | UCD AFC captain 2001–2007 | Succeeded by Conor Kenna |
Awards
| Preceded by Darren Quigley | UCD Supporters' Player of the Year; 2006 | Succeeded by Conan Byrne |
