= Ray Henderson (footballer) =

English footballer (1937–2024)

Personal information
- Full name: Raymond Henderson
- Date of birth: 31 March 1937
- Place of birth: Wallsend, England
- Date of death: 18 January 2024 (aged 86)
- Place of death: Wetherby, England
- Position: Right winger

Senior career*
Years	Team	Apps	(Gls)
1957–1961	Middlesbrough	9	(0)
1961–1968	Hull City	229	(54)
1968–1969	Reading	5	(0)
Total		243	(54)

Managerial career
- 1969: Reading (caretaker)
- 1971–1972: Halifax Town
- 1976–1977: Southport
- * Club domestic league appearances and goals

Raymond Henderson (31 March 1937 – 18 January 2024) was an English professional footballer who played as a right winger for Middlesbrough, Hull City, and Reading.

== Playing career ==
=== Middlesbrough ===
Henderson was born on 31 March 1937, in Wallsend, North Tyneside. Whilst training as a marine engineer, he began playing semi-professional football for Ashington in the mid-1950s. It was during this time that he was spotted by Middlesbrough, then in the Second Division. After performing well with their reserves, Henderson made his senior debut in professional football on 23 November 1957. At home to Ipswich Town in the league, Boro won 5–2 courtesy of 4 goals from Brian Clough.

=== Hull City ===
After failing to gain traction on Teesside, Henderson signed for Third Division club Hull City in June 1961. He made his debut for the Tigers in the second game of the new season, a 4–0 loss away to Port Vale on 21 August. Just over two weeks later, on 9 September, the winger scored an impressive brace at home to Torquay United in a 4–0 win.

On 28 August 1965, Henderson became the first player to substituted onto the pitch for Hull City, in a game against Brighton & Hove Albion at the Goldstone Ground. The then 28-year-old would go on to score the winner, earning his side an important 2–1 victory on the South Coast. By this time, he was a part of a formidable strike force, nicknamed "the Front Five". The 1965–66 season saw the Tigers earn promotion to the second tier as champions, with Henderson scoring 13 goals in the league.

His contract with Hull would expire in the summer of 1968, but Henderson would stay for a final few months to work for the club as a trainer.

=== Reading ===
In October 1968, Henderson left East Yorkshire for Reading, where he was appointed a player-coach. Once long-serving manager Roy Bentley was sacked the following February, Henderson became the club's caretaker, leading them for 19 games before Jack Mansell was made Bentley's permanent replacement.

== Coaching career ==
Henderson departed Elm Park in May 1971, and later joined Halifax Town for a brief spell as manager. He then worked as a scout for Oxford United, prior to managing the reserve side at Everton and Fourth Division outfit Southport.

== Death ==
On 18 January 2024, Henderson died at a care home in Wetherby aged 86.

== Honours ==
Hull City

- Third Division: 1965–66
