= Ron Young (footballer, born 1945) =

English footballer

Personal information
- Full name: Ronald Young
- Date of birth: 31 August 1945
- Place of birth: Dunston-on-Tyne, England
- Position: Winger

Senior career*
Years	Team	Apps	(Gls)
1963–1968	Hull City	26	(5)
1968–1973	Hartlepool	186	(40)
1973–1974	South Shields		
1974–197?	Bishop Auckland		
- * Club domestic league appearances and goals

Ronald Young (born 31 August 1945) is an English former footballer who played as a winger. He made more than 200 appearances in the Football League playing for Hull City and Hartlepool. He also played non-League football for South Shields and Bishop Auckland.

== Life and career ==
Young was born in 1945 in Dunston-on-Tyne, in what was then County Durham. He signed for Hull City in 1963, and made his first-team debut on 7 October 1964 in a 7–0 win at home to Barnsley in the Football League Third Division. He played in seven more league matches in October, scored his first goal in a 3–1 win at home to Luton Town, and was only on the losing side in the last of the eight. Hull City were promoted to the Second Division for 1965–66, and Young made a further 18 appearances and scored five goals at that level over the next two seasons.

He signed for Third Division club Hartlepool in September 1968, and marked his debut with a headed goal that helped his new team achieve their first win of the season, by two goals to one at home to Watford on 16 September. He finished the season with six goals from 39 league matches, as his team were relegated to the Fourth Division. Hartlepool's performances were so poor that they had to apply for re-election to the League in both of the next two seasons. In 1971–72, Young scored 18 league goals, which made him the club's top scorer and helped Hartlepool finish in 18th place, above the re-election positions. He spent one more season with the club, taking his totals to 46 goals from 199 appearances in all competitions.

Young helped Northern Premier League club South Shields reach the semi-final of the 1973–74 FA Trophy, and went on to play for Northern League club Bishop Auckland.
