= Sproatley =

Village and civil parish in the East Riding of Yorkshire, England

Coordinates: 53.794420°N 0.191573°W

- Location within the East Riding of Yorkshire
- Population: 5,750 (2011 census)
- OS grid reference: TA192346
- Civil parish: Sproatley
- Unitary authority: East Riding of Yorkshire
- Ceremonial county: East Riding of Yorkshire
- Region: Yorkshire and the Humber
- Country: England
- Sovereign state: United Kingdom
- Post town: HULL
- Postcode district: HU11
- Dialling code: 01482
- Police: Humberside
- Fire: Humberside
- Ambulance: Yorkshire
- UK Parliament: Beverley and Holderness

Sproatley is a village and civil parish in the East Riding of Yorkshire, England. It is situated approximately 7 miles (11 km) north-east of Hull city centre and 4 miles (6.4 km) north of Hedon at the junction of the B1238 and B1240 roads.

The name Sproatley derives from the Old English sprotalēah meaning 'sprout wood/clearing'.

The village church, dedicated to St. Swithin, is said to contain a small chamber organ built by 'Father' Smith in the late 17th, early 18th century. The church was designated a Grade II listed building in 1987.

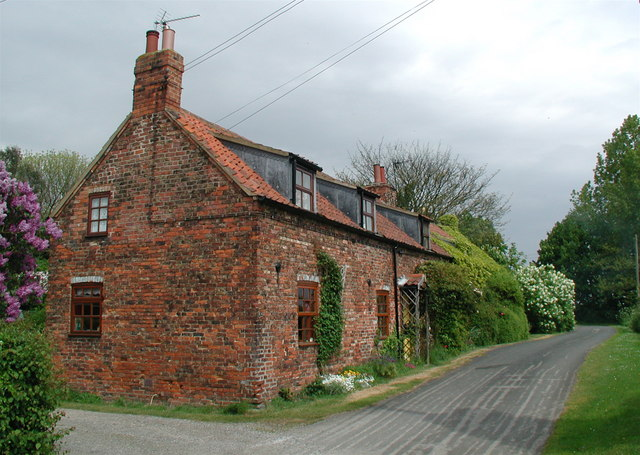
Boggle Lane, Sproatley

According to the 2011 UK census, Sproatley parish had a population of 1,350, a decrease on the 2001 UK census figure of 1,353.

== Notable people ==
Chris Chilton (1943–2021) Hull City footballer, was born in Sproatley.

== See also ==
- Listed buildings in Sproatley
