= Martin Butler (footballer, born 1966) =

English footballer

Personal information
- Full name: Martin Butler
- Date of birth: 3 March 1966 (age 60)
- Place of birth: Hessle, East Riding of Yorkshire, England
- Height: 5 ft 8 in (1.73 m)
- Position: Striker

Youth career
- –1984: York City

Senior career*
Years	Team	Apps	(Gls)
1984–1989	York City	65	(9)
1985	→ Aldershot (loan)	2	(1)
1987	→ Exeter City (loan)	4	(1)
1988	→ Carlisle United (loan)	1	(0)
1989	Scunthorpe United	2	(0)
1989	Macclesfield Town	0	(0)
1989–1990	Scarborough	6	(0)
1990–	North Ferriby United		
- Guiseley
- North Ferriby United
Total		80	(11)
- * Club domestic league appearances and goals

Martin Butler (born 3 March 1966) is an English former professional footballer who played as a striker in the Football League for York City, Aldershot, Exeter City, Carlisle United, Scunthorpe United and Scarborough and in non-League football for Macclesfield Town, North Ferriby United and Guiseley. His father, Ian Butler, also played for York City.
