= Ken Houghton =

English footballer (1939–2025)

Personal information
- Full name: Kenneth Houghton
- Date of birth: 18 October 1939
- Place of birth: Rotherham, England
- Date of death: 26 September 2025 (aged 85)
- Position: Forward

Senior career*
Years	Team	Apps	(Gls)
1960–1965	Rotherham United	149	(56)
1965–1973	Hull City	264	(79)
1973–1974	Scunthorpe United	33	(5)
Total		446	(140)

Managerial career
- 1974–1975: Scarborough
- 1978–1979: Hull City
- * Club domestic league appearances and goals

Kenneth Houghton (18 October 1939 – 26 September 2025) was an English football player and manager. A forward, he played for Rotherham United, Hull City and Scunthorpe United, where he scored a combined total of 140 goals in 434 league appearances. He was later appointed player-coach at Scarborough leading them to the final of the 1974–75 FA Trophy. He also had spells as manager of his former club Hull City and Bridlington Town. Houghton died on 26 September 2025, at the age of 85.

== Honours ==
Rotherham United

- Football League Cup runner-up: 1960–61

Hull City

- Football League Third Division: 1965–66
