= Mike Milner =

English footballer

Personal information
- Date of birth: 21 September 1939 (age 87)
- Place of birth: Hull, England
- Position: Centre half

Senior career*
Years	Team	Apps	(Gls)
1958–1968	Hull City	160	(0)
1968–1969	Stockport County	41	(0)
1969–1970	Barrow	11	(0)
1970	Bradford City	1	(0)
- Goole Town
Total		213	(0)
- * Club domestic league appearances and goals

Mike Milner (born 21 September 1939) is an English former professional footballer who played as a centre half.

== Career ==
Born in Hull, Milner played for Hull City, Stockport County, Barrow, Bradford City and Goole Town.
