= 1965–66 Football League First Division =

1965–66 season of Football League First Division

Football League First Division
- Season: 1965–66
- Champions: Liverpool; 7th English title
- Relegated: Northampton Town; Blackburn Rovers
- European Cup: Liverpool
- European Cup Winners' Cup: Everton
- Inter-Cities Fairs Cup: Leeds United; Burnley; West Bromwich Albion
- Matches: 462
- Goals: 1,457 (3.15 per match)
- Top goalscorer: Roger Hunt; Willie Irvine (29 goals each)

Statistics of Football League First Division in the 1965–66 season.

== Overview ==
Liverpool won the First Division title for the seventh time in the club's history that season. They made sure of that with a 2–1 win over Chelsea at Anfield on 30 April, and ended the season 6 points clear of Leeds United. Blackburn Rovers were relegated on April 20, after losing 1–0 at home to West Bromwich Albion and Northampton Town's result at White Hart Lane against Tottenham Hotspur (which finished 1–1) going against Blackburn. Northampton Town also went down on 7 May, after Nottingham Forest beat Sheffield Wednesday 1–0 at the City Ground, saving Forest from relegation in the process.

== League standings ==
Pos	Team	Pld	W	D	L	GF	GA	GAv	Pts	Qualification or relegation
1	Liverpool (C)	42	26	9	7	79	34	2.324	61	Qualification for the European Cup first round
2	Leeds United	42	23	9	10	79	38	2.079	55	Qualification for the Inter-Cities Fairs Cup second round
3	Burnley	42	24	7	11	79	47	1.681	55	Qualification for the Inter-Cities Fairs Cup first round
4	Manchester United	42	18	15	9	84	59	1.424	51	
5	Chelsea	42	22	7	13	65	53	1.226	51	
6	West Bromwich Albion	42	19	12	11	91	69	1.319	50	Qualification for the Inter-Cities Fairs Cup second round
7	Leicester City	42	21	7	14	80	65	1.231	49	
8	Tottenham Hotspur	42	16	12	14	75	66	1.136	44	
9	Sheffield United	42	16	11	15	56	59	0.949	43	
10	Stoke City	42	15	12	15	65	64	1.016	42	
11	Everton	42	15	11	16	56	62	0.903	41	Qualification for the European Cup Winners' Cup first round (Note: Everton qualified for the European Cup Winners' Cup as the 1965–66 FA Cup winners.)
12	West Ham United	42	15	9	18	70	83	0.843	39	
13	Blackpool	42	14	9	19	55	65	0.846	37	
14	Arsenal	42	12	13	17	62	75	0.827	37	
15	Newcastle United	42	14	9	19	50	63	0.794	37	
16	Aston Villa	42	15	6	21	69	80	0.863	36	
17	Sheffield Wednesday	42	14	8	20	56	66	0.848	36	
18	Nottingham Forest	42	14	8	20	56	72	0.778	36	
19	Sunderland	42	14	8	20	51	72	0.708	36	
20	Fulham	42	14	7	21	67	85	0.788	35	
21	Northampton Town (R)	42	10	13	19	55	92	0.598	33	Relegation to the Second Division
22	Blackburn Rovers (R)	42	8	4	30	57	88	0.648	20	Relegation to the Second Division

Source: World Football
Rules for classification: 1) Points; 2) Goal average; 3) Goals scored
(C) Champions; (R) Relegated

== Results ==
Home \ Away	ARS	AST	BLB	BLP	BUR	CHE	EVE	FUL	LEE	LEI	LIV	MUN	NEW	NOR	NOT	SHU	SHW	STK	SUN	TOT	WBA	WHU
Arsenal		3–3	2–2	0–0	1–1	1–3	0–1	2–1	0–3	1–0	0–1	4–2	1–3	1–1	1–0	6–2	5–2	2–1	1–1	1–1	1–1	3–2
Aston Villa	3–0		3–1	3–0	2–1	2–4	3–2	2–5	0–2	2–2	0–3	1–1	4–2	1–2	3–0	0–2	2–0	0–1	3–1	3–2	1–1	1–2
Blackburn Rovers	2–1	0–2		1–3	0–2	0–1	1–2	3–2	2–3	0–2	1–4	1–4	4–2	6–1	5–0	0–0	1–2	0–1	2–0	0–1	0–1	1–2
Blackpool	5–3	0–1	4–2		1–3	1–2	2–0	2–2	1–0	4–0	2–3	1–2	1–1	3–0	0–3	2–1	2–1	1–1	1–2	0–0	1–1	2–1
Burnley	2–2	3–1	1–4	3–1		1–2	1–1	1–0	0–1	4–2	2–0	3–0	1–0	4–1	4–1	2–0	2–1	4–1	1–0	1–1	2–0	3–1
Chelsea	0–0	0–2	1–0	0–1	1–1		3–1	2–1	1–0	0–2	0–1	2–0	1–1	1–0	1–0	2–0	1–1	1–2	3–2	2–1	2–3	6–2
Everton	3–1	2–0	2–2	0–0	1–0	2–1		2–0	0–0	1–2	0–0	0–0	1–0	5–2	3–0	1–3	5–1	2–1	2–0	3–1	2–3	2–2
Fulham	1–0	3–6	5–2	0–0	2–5	0–3	3–2		1–3	0–4	2–0	0–1	2–0	1–4	1–1	0–0	4–2	1–1	3–0	0–2	2–1	3–0
Leeds United	2–0	2–0	3–0	1–2	1–1	2–0	4–1	0–1		3–2	0–1	1–1	3–0	6–1	2–1	2–2	3–0	2–2	1–0	2–0	4–0	5–0
Leicester City	3–1	2–1	2–0	0–3	0–1	1–1	3–0	5–0	3–3		1–3	0–5	1–2	1–1	2–1	1–0	4–1	1–0	4–1	2–2	2–1	2–1
Liverpool	4–2	3–1	5–2	4–1	2–1	2–1	5–0	2–1	0–1	1–0		2–1	2–0	5–0	4–0	0–1	1–0	2–0	4–0	1–0	2–2	1–1
Manchester United	2–1	6–1	2–2	2–1	4–2	4–1	3–0	4–1	1–1	1–2	2–0		1–1	6–2	0–0	3–1	1–0	1–1	1–1	5–1	1–1	0–0
Newcastle United	0–1	1–0	2–1	2–0	3–2	0–1	0–0	1–1	2–0	1–5	0–0	1–2		2–0	2–2	0–2	2–0	3–1	2–0	0–0	0–1	2–1
Northampton Town	1–1	2–1	2–1	2–1	1–2	2–3	0–2	2–4	2–1	2–2	0–0	1–1	3–1		3–3	0–1	0–0	1–0	2–1	0–2	3–4	2–1
Nottingham Forest	0–1	1–2	0–3	2–1	1–0	1–2	1–0	1–2	0–4	2–0	1–1	4–2	1–2	1–1		1–0	1–0	4–3	0–0	1–0	3–2	5–0
Sheffield United	3–0	1–0	2–0	0–1	2–1	1–2	2–0	2–0	1–1	2–2	0–0	3–1	3–2	2–2	1–1		1–0	3–2	2–2	1–3	0–2	5–3
Sheffield Wednesday	4–0	2–0	2–1	3–0	0–2	1–1	3–1	1–0	0–0	1–2	0–2	0–0	1–0	3–1	3–1	2–2		4–1	3–1	1–1	1–2	0–0
Stoke City	1–3	2–0	3–2	4–1	3–1	2–2	1–1	3–2	1–2	1–0	0–0	2–2	4–0	6–2	1–0	2–0	3–1		1–1	0–1	1–1	1–0
Sunderland	0–2	2–0	1–0	2–1	0–4	2–0	2–0	2–2	2–0	0–3	2–2	2–3	2–0	3–0	3–2	4–1	0–2	2–0		2–0	1–5	2–1
Tottenham Hotspur	2–2	5–5	4–0	4–0	0–1	4–2	2–2	4–3	3–2	4–2	2–1	5–1	2–2	1–1	2–3	1–0	2–3	2–2	3–0		2–1	1–4
West Bromwich Albion	4–4	2–2	2–1	2–1	1–2	1–2	1–1	6–2	1–2	5–1	3–0	3–3	1–2	1–1	5–3	1–1	4–2	6–2	4–1	2–1		3–0
West Ham United	2–1	4–2	4–1	1–1	1–1	2–1	3–0	1–3	2–1	2–5	1–5	3–2	4–3	1–1	0–3	4–0	4–2	0–0	1–1	2–0	4–0	

Updated to match(es) played on unknown. Source: Ian Laschke: Rothmans Book of Football League Records 1888–89 to 1978–79. Macdonald and Jane’s, London & Sydney, 1980.
Legend: Blue = home team win; Yellow = draw; Red = away team win.

== Top scorers ==
Rank	Player	Club	Goals
1	(England) Roger Hunt	Liverpool	29
=	(Northern Ireland) Willie Irvine	Burnley	29
2	(England) Tony Hateley	Aston Villa	27
3	(Scotland) David Herd	Manchester United	24
4	(England) Geoff Hurst	West Ham United	23
5	(Scotland) Jackie Sinclair	Leicester City	22
