= 1965–66 Football League =

67th season of the Football League

The Football League
- Season: 1965–66
- Champions: Liverpool

The 1965–66 season was the 67th completed season of the Football League.

This season is notable for Liverpool winning the title – their seventh overall – with only 14 squad players. The Second, Third and Fourth Divisions were won by Manchester City, Hull City and Doncaster Rovers respectively.

== Final league tables ==
The tables and results below are reproduced here in the exact form that they can be found at The Rec.Sport.Soccer Statistics Foundation website and in Rothmans Book of Football League Records 1888–89 to 1978–79, with home and away statistics separated.

Beginning with the 1894–95 season, clubs finishing level on points were separated according to goal average (goals scored divided by goals conceded), or more properly put, goal ratio. In case one or more teams had the same goal difference, this system favoured those teams who had scored fewer goals. The goal average system was eventually scrapped beginning with the 1976–77 season.

Since the Fourth Division was established in the 1958–59 season, the bottom four teams of that division have been required to apply for re-election.

== First Division ==
First Division
- Season: 1965–66
- Champions: Liverpool; 7th title
- Relegated: Northampton Town; Blackburn Rovers
- European Cup: Liverpool
- European Cup Winners' Cup: Everton
- Inter-Cities Fairs Cup: Leeds United; Burnley; West Bromwich Albion
- Matches: 462
- Goals: 1,457 (3.15 per match)
- Top goalscorer: Roger Hunt; Willie Irvine (29 goals each)

Pos	Team	Pld	W	D	L	GF	GA	GAv	Pts	Qualification or relegation
1	Liverpool (C)	42	26	9	7	79	34	2.324	61	Qualification for the European Cup first round
2	Leeds United	42	23	9	10	79	38	2.079	55	Qualification for the Inter-Cities Fairs Cup second round
3	Burnley	42	24	7	11	79	47	1.681	55	Qualification for the Inter-Cities Fairs Cup first round
4	Manchester United	42	18	15	9	84	59	1.424	51	
5	Chelsea	42	22	7	13	65	53	1.226	51	
6	West Bromwich Albion	42	19	12	11	91	69	1.319	50	Qualification for the Inter-Cities Fairs Cup second round
7	Leicester City	42	21	7	14	80	65	1.231	49	
8	Tottenham Hotspur	42	16	12	14	75	66	1.136	44	
9	Sheffield United	42	16	11	15	56	59	0.949	43	
10	Stoke City	42	15	12	15	65	64	1.016	42	
11	Everton	42	15	11	16	56	62	0.903	41	Qualification for the European Cup Winners' Cup first round (Note: Everton qualified for the European Cup Winners' Cup as the 1965–66 FA Cup winners.)
12	West Ham United	42	15	9	18	70	83	0.843	39	
13	Blackpool	42	14	9	19	55	65	0.846	37	
14	Arsenal	42	12	13	17	62	75	0.827	37	
15	Newcastle United	42	14	9	19	50	63	0.794	37	
16	Aston Villa	42	15	6	21	69	80	0.863	36	
17	Sheffield Wednesday	42	14	8	20	56	66	0.848	36	
18	Nottingham Forest	42	14	8	20	56	72	0.778	36	
19	Sunderland	42	14	8	20	51	72	0.708	36	
20	Fulham	42	14	7	21	67	85	0.788	35	
21	Northampton Town (R)	42	10	13	19	55	92	0.598	33	Relegation to the Second Division
22	Blackburn Rovers (R)	42	8	4	30	57	88	0.648	20	Relegation to the Second Division

Source: World Football
Rules for classification: 1) Points; 2) Goal average; 3) Goals scored
(C) Champions; (R) Relegated

=== Results ===
Home \ Away	ARS	AST	BLB	BLP	BUR	CHE	EVE	FUL	LEE	LEI	LIV	MUN	NEW	NOR	NOT	SHU	SHW	STK	SUN	TOT	WBA	WHU
Arsenal		3–3	2–2	0–0	1–1	1–3	0–1	2–1	0–3	1–0	0–1	4–2	1–3	1–1	1–0	6–2	5–2	2–1	1–1	1–1	1–1	3–2
Aston Villa	3–0		3–1	3–0	2–1	2–4	3–2	2–5	0–2	2–2	0–3	1–1	4–2	1–2	3–0	0–2	2–0	0–1	3–1	3–2	1–1	1–2
Blackburn Rovers	2–1	0–2		1–3	0–2	0–1	1–2	3–2	2–3	0–2	1–4	1–4	4–2	6–1	5–0	0–0	1–2	0–1	2–0	0–1	0–1	1–2
Blackpool	5–3	0–1	4–2		1–3	1–2	2–0	2–2	1–0	4–0	2–3	1–2	1–1	3–0	0–3	2–1	2–1	1–1	1–2	0–0	1–1	2–1
Burnley	2–2	3–1	1–4	3–1		1–2	1–1	1–0	0–1	4–2	2–0	3–0	1–0	4–1	4–1	2–0	2–1	4–1	1–0	1–1	2–0	3–1
Chelsea	0–0	0–2	1–0	0–1	1–1		3–1	2–1	1–0	0–2	0–1	2–0	1–1	1–0	1–0	2–0	1–1	1–2	3–2	2–1	2–3	6–2
Everton	3–1	2–0	2–2	0–0	1–0	2–1		2–0	0–0	1–2	0–0	0–0	1–0	5–2	3–0	1–3	5–1	2–1	2–0	3–1	2–3	2–2
Fulham	1–0	3–6	5–2	0–0	2–5	0–3	3–2		1–3	0–4	2–0	0–1	2–0	1–4	1–1	0–0	4–2	1–1	3–0	0–2	2–1	3–0
Leeds United	2–0	2–0	3–0	1–2	1–1	2–0	4–1	0–1		3–2	0–1	1–1	3–0	6–1	2–1	2–2	3–0	2–2	1–0	2–0	4–0	5–0
Leicester City	3–1	2–1	2–0	0–3	0–1	1–1	3–0	5–0	3–3		1–3	0–5	1–2	1–1	2–1	1–0	4–1	1–0	4–1	2–2	2–1	2–1
Liverpool	4–2	3–1	5–2	4–1	2–1	2–1	5–0	2–1	0–1	1–0		2–1	2–0	5–0	4–0	0–1	1–0	2–0	4–0	1–0	2–2	1–1
Manchester United	2–1	6–1	2–2	2–1	4–2	4–1	3–0	4–1	1–1	1–2	2–0		1–1	6–2	0–0	3–1	1–0	1–1	1–1	5–1	1–1	0–0
Newcastle United	0–1	1–0	2–1	2–0	3–2	0–1	0–0	1–1	2–0	1–5	0–0	1–2		2–0	2–2	0–2	2–0	3–1	2–0	0–0	0–1	2–1
Northampton Town	1–1	2–1	2–1	2–1	1–2	2–3	0–2	2–4	2–1	2–2	0–0	1–1	3–1		3–3	0–1	0–0	1–0	2–1	0–2	3–4	2–1
Nottingham Forest	0–1	1–2	0–3	2–1	1–0	1–2	1–0	1–2	0–4	2–0	1–1	4–2	1–2	1–1		1–0	1–0	4–3	0–0	1–0	3–2	5–0
Sheffield United	3–0	1–0	2–0	0–1	2–1	1–2	2–0	2–0	1–1	2–2	0–0	3–1	3–2	2–2	1–1		1–0	3–2	2–2	1–3	0–2	5–3
Sheffield Wednesday	4–0	2–0	2–1	3–0	0–2	1–1	3–1	1–0	0–0	1–2	0–2	0–0	1–0	3–1	3–1	2–2		4–1	3–1	1–1	1–2	0–0
Stoke City	1–3	2–0	3–2	4–1	3–1	2–2	1–1	3–2	1–2	1–0	0–0	2–2	4–0	6–2	1–0	2–0	3–1		1–1	0–1	1–1	1–0
Sunderland	0–2	2–0	1–0	2–1	0–4	2–0	2–0	2–2	2–0	0–3	2–2	2–3	2–0	3–0	3–2	4–1	0–2	2–0		2–0	1–5	2–1
Tottenham Hotspur	2–2	5–5	4–0	4–0	0–1	4–2	2–2	4–3	3–2	4–2	2–1	5–1	2–2	1–1	2–3	1–0	2–3	2–2	3–0		2–1	1–4
West Bromwich Albion	4–4	2–2	2–1	2–1	1–2	1–2	1–1	6–2	1–2	5–1	3–0	3–3	1–2	1–1	5–3	1–1	4–2	6–2	4–1	2–1		3–0
West Ham United	2–1	4–2	4–1	1–1	1–1	2–1	3–0	1–3	2–1	2–5	1–5	3–2	4–3	1–1	0–3	4–0	4–2	0–0	1–1	2–0	4–0	

Updated to match(es) played on unknown. Source: Ian Laschke: Rothmans Book of Football League Records 1888–89 to 1978–79. Macdonald and Jane's, London & Sydney, 1980.
Legend: Blue = home team win; Yellow = draw; Red = away team win.

=== Maps ===
Locations of the London-based First Division teams
Locations of the First Division teams

== Second Division ==
Second Division
- Season: 1965–66
- Champions: Manchester City
- Promoted: Manchester City; Southampton
- Relegated: Middlesbrough; Leyton Orient
- Matches: 462
- Goals: 1,421 (3.08 per match)
- Top goalscorer: Martin Chivers (30 goals)

Pos	Team	Pld	W	D	L	GF	GA	GAv	Pts	Qualification or relegation
1	Manchester City (C, P)	42	22	15	5	76	44	1.727	59	Promotion to the First Division
2	Southampton (P)	42	22	10	10	85	56	1.518	54	Promotion to the First Division
3	Coventry City	42	20	13	9	73	53	1.377	53	
4	Huddersfield Town	42	19	13	10	62	36	1.722	51	
5	Bristol City	42	17	17	8	63	48	1.313	51	
6	Wolverhampton Wanderers	42	20	10	12	87	61	1.426	50	
7	Rotherham United	42	16	14	12	75	74	1.014	46	
8	Derby County	42	16	11	15	71	68	1.044	43	
9	Bolton Wanderers	42	16	9	17	62	59	1.051	41	
10	Birmingham City	42	16	9	17	70	75	0.933	41	
11	Crystal Palace	42	14	13	15	47	52	0.904	41	
12	Portsmouth	42	16	8	18	74	78	0.949	40	
13	Norwich City	42	12	15	15	52	52	1.000	39	
14	Carlisle United	42	17	5	20	60	63	0.952	39	
15	Ipswich Town	42	15	9	18	58	66	0.879	39	
16	Charlton Athletic	42	12	14	16	61	70	0.871	38	
17	Preston North End	42	11	15	16	62	70	0.886	37	
18	Plymouth Argyle	42	12	13	17	54	63	0.857	37	
19	Bury	42	14	7	21	62	76	0.816	35	
20	Cardiff City	42	12	10	20	71	91	0.780	34	
21	Middlesbrough (R)	42	10	13	19	58	86	0.674	33	Relegation to the Third Division
22	Leyton Orient (R)	42	5	13	24	38	80	0.475	23	Relegation to the Third Division

Rules for classification: 1) Points; 2) Goal average; 3) Goals scored
(C) Champions; (P) Promoted; (R) Relegated

=== Results ===
Home \ Away	BIR	BOL	BRI	BRY	CAR	CRL	CHA	COV	CRY	DER	HUD	IPS	LEY	MCI	MID	NWC	PLY	POR	PNE	ROT	SOU	WOL
Birmingham		0–1	1–3	4–0	4–2	2–1	2–2	0–1	2–1	5–5	2–1	4–1	2–2	3–1	1–1	1–0	1–0	1–3	1–1	3–0	0–1	2–2
Bolton Wanderers	1–2		1–2	2–1	2–1	4–0	4–2	4–2	3–0	0–1	1–1	3–1	2–0	1–0	6–0	1–1	0–1	2–0	1–3	1–3	2–3	2–1
Bristol City	2–0	2–2		2–1	1–1	2–0	0–0	1–1	1–1	1–1	2–1	4–1	2–0	1–1	2–2	0–0	0–0	1–0	1–0	2–1	0–1	0–1
Bury	5–1	1–1	1–2		1–1	2–1	3–0	1–1	2–2	4–1	0–4	1–1	3–0	2–1	2–0	2–5	1–0	1–0	5–0	6–1	1–3	1–0
Cardiff City	1–3	1–1	2–1	1–0		1–1	3–1	1–2	1–0	2–1	0–1	1–0	3–1	4–3	5–3	0–2	5–1	1–2	1–3	0–0	3–5	1–4
Carlisle United	1–0	1–1	5–0	4–1	2–0		3–1	2–2	3–1	2–1	2–0	3–1	1–0	1–2	2–1	4–1	1–3	2–1	0–2	1–0	1–0	2–1
Charlton Athletic	2–1	0–1	1–4	0–1	5–2	3–2		2–0	1–0	2–2	0–2	2–0	3–0	2–3	1–0	2–1	1–1	2–2	5–2	2–2	2–2	1–1
Coventry City	4–3	2–2	2–2	1–0	3–1	3–2	3–1		0–1	3–2	0–3	3–1	1–1	3–3	2–1	2–0	5–1	3–2	5–1	2–2	5–1	2–1
Crystal Palace	1–0	1–1	2–1	1–0	0–0	2–0	2–0	0–1		1–1	2–1	3–1	2–1	0–2	1–1	0–0	3–1	4–1	1–1	2–2	1–0	0–1
Derby County	5–3	2–0	2–1	4–1	1–5	3–1	2–0	1–0	4–0		4–1	2–2	1–3	1–2	5–0	3–1	1–2	3–1	1–0	1–3	0–3	2–2
Huddersfield Town	2–0	1–0	3–0	2–0	1–1	2–0	1–1	0–2	1–1	1–3		1–0	1–1	0–0	6–0	0–0	2–1	2–0	2–1	4–0	2–0	1–1
Ipswich Town	0–1	2–0	0–0	3–4	2–1	1–0	1–4	1–0	2–2	2–2	2–2		3–2	1–1	2–1	2–0	4–1	1–0	1–0	0–0	3–0	5–2
Leyton Orient	2–1	1–0	0–4	2–2	1–1	2–1	1–2	1–1	0–2	0–0	0–2	1–4		2–2	2–3	0–0	0–1	0–0	2–2	1–4	1–1	0–3
Manchester City	3–1	4–1	2–2	1–0	2–2	2–1	0–0	1–0	3–1	1–0	2–0	2–1	5–0		3–1	0–0	1–1	3–0	0–0	3–1	0–0	2–1
Middlesbrough	1–1	1–1	4–2	1–0	3–4	0–2	2–2	1–1	2–2	0–0	1–3	3–2	2–1	1–1		0–1	0–1	5–2	2–1	4–0	0–0	3–1
Norwich City	2–2	3–0	0–0	4–0	3–2	2–0	2–0	1–1	2–1	0–1	1–1	1–0	2–1	3–3	1–2		0–0	1–3	1–1	1–2	3–4	0–3
Plymouth Argyle	6–1	1–3	0–2	2–2	2–2	0–0	3–0	1–2	1–2	0–0	0–0	3–0	1–1	1–0	2–2	2–0		3–1	0–1	5–2	2–3	2–2
Portsmouth	0–1	1–0	2–4	4–0	3–1	4–1	3–1	2–0	1–1	1–1	2–1	1–0	4–1	2–2	4–1	0–3	4–1		4–1	1–1	2–5	2–0
Preston North End	3–3	0–1	1–1	2–1	9–0	2–1	3–3	0–0	2–0	2–0	1–1	0–1	1–2	0–3	1–1	0–0	2–0	4–1		1–1	1–1	2–2
Rotherham United	3–4	2–1	1–2	2–1	6–4	3–3	0–0	1–1	3–0	3–0	0–0	0–0	2–1	0–1	4–1	2–1	2–0	3–3	6–3		1–0	4–3
Southampton	0–1	5–1	2–2	6–2	3–2	1–0	1–0	1–0	1–0	3–1	0–1	1–2	1–0	0–1	3–1	2–2	4–1	2–2	5–2	1–1		9–3
Wolverhampton Wanderers	2–0	3–1	1–1	3–0	2–1	3–0	2–2	0–1	1–0	4–0	2–1	4–1	2–1	2–4	3–0	2–1	0–0	8–2	3–0	4–1	1–1	

Updated to match(es) played on unknown. Source: Ian Laschke: Rothmans Book of Football League Records 1888–89 to 1978–79. Macdonald and Jane's, London & Sydney, 1980.
Legend: Blue = home team win; Yellow = draw; Red = away team win.

=== Maps ===
Locations of the London-based Second Division teams
Locations of the Second Division teams

== Third Division ==
Football League Third Division
- Season: 1965–66
- Champions: Hull City (1st title)
- Promoted: Millwall
- Relegated: Brentford; Exeter City; Southend United; York City
- Matches: 552
- Goals: 1,628 (2.95 per match)
- Top goalscorer: Les Allen (Queens Park Rangers), 30

Pos	Team	Pld	W	D	L	GF	GA	GAv	Pts	Promotion or relegation
1	Hull City (C, P)	46	31	7	8	109	62	1.758	69	Promotion to the Second Division
2	Millwall (P)	46	27	11	8	76	43	1.767	65	Promotion to the Second Division
3	Queens Park Rangers	46	24	9	13	95	65	1.462	57	
4	Scunthorpe United	46	21	11	14	80	67	1.194	53	
5	Workington	46	19	14	13	67	57	1.175	52	
6	Gillingham	46	22	8	16	62	54	1.148	52	
7	Swindon Town	46	19	13	14	74	48	1.542	51	
8	Reading	46	19	13	14	70	63	1.111	51	
9	Walsall	46	20	10	16	77	64	1.203	50	
10	Shrewsbury Town	46	19	11	16	73	64	1.141	49	
11	Grimsby Town	46	17	13	16	68	62	1.097	47	
12	Watford	46	17	13	16	55	51	1.078	47	
13	Peterborough United	46	17	12	17	80	66	1.212	46	
14	Oxford United	46	19	8	19	70	74	0.946	46	
15	Brighton & Hove Albion	46	16	11	19	67	65	1.031	43	
16	Bristol Rovers	46	14	14	18	64	64	1.000	42	
17	Swansea Town	46	15	11	20	81	96	0.844	41	Qualification for the European Cup Winners' Cup first round
18	Bournemouth & Boscombe Athletic	46	13	12	21	38	56	0.679	38	
19	Mansfield Town	46	15	8	23	59	89	0.663	38	
20	Oldham Athletic	46	12	13	21	55	81	0.679	37	
21	Southend United (R)	46	16	4	26	54	83	0.651	36	Relegation to the Fourth Division
22	Exeter City (R)	46	12	11	23	53	79	0.671	35	Relegation to the Fourth Division
23	Brentford (R)	46	10	12	24	48	69	0.696	32	Relegation to the Fourth Division
24	York City (R)	46	9	9	28	53	106	0.500	27	Relegation to the Fourth Division

(C) Champions; (P) Promoted; (R) Relegated

=== Results ===
Home \ Away	B&BA	BRE	B&HA	BRR	EXE	GIL	GRI	HUL	MAN	MIL	OLD	OXF	PET	QPR	REA	SCU	SHR	STD	SWA	SWI	WAL	WAT	WRK	YOR
Bournemouth & Boscombe Athletic		0–1	0–1	1–0	0–1	1–1	1–0	1–1	2–2	0–0	1–0	1–1	2–3	1–1	3–2	1–2	2–0	0–0	2–1	1–0	0–1	2–0	1–1	1–0
Brentford	1–0		2–0	0–5	1–2	0–2	3–2	2–4	0–3	1–2	0–0	5–1	1–0	6–1	1–1	0–1	4–0	2–0	2–0	0–1	2–2	1–1	0–1	0–1
Brighton & Hove Albion	1–2	2–0		4–3	2–1	0–1	1–2	1–2	6–4	2–2	3–1	2–0	1–0	0–2	1–1	0–1	1–1	9–1	1–1	1–0	2–1	2–0	3–1	3–1
Bristol Rovers	0–0	1–1	0–0		2–0	0–0	2–1	1–2	6–0	1–1	4–0	3–1	1–1	1–0	0–0	2–0	3–2	3–1	2–1	0–1	3–0	1–1	2–2	0–0
Exeter City	1–0	5–0	2–0	1–0		3–1	2–0	1–4	2–2	1–2	4–0	1–2	2–5	0–0	1–2	4–0	0–0	1–1	1–1	1–1	0–2	1–2	2–1	0–2
Gillingham	2–0	1–0	3–1	2–0	1–1		3–2	0–3	2–0	1–0	3–0	1–2	1–1	3–1	2–4	0–1	0–1	1–0	2–0	1–0	1–0	2–2	1–0	0–0
Grimsby Town	2–0	3–2	3–1	1–1	1–1	3–1		1–0	0–1	2–0	3–1	1–1	3–0	4–2	3–3	1–3	2–1	1–0	2–2	2–2	3–1	2–1	1–0	3–1
Hull City	3–0	4–1	1–0	6–1	6–1	1–0	1–1		4–0	1–0	5–1	2–1	2–1	1–3	3–3	3–2	2–1	1–0	4–1	1–0	3–2	3–1	6–0	1–4
Mansfield Town	1–0	2–0	3–1	2–0	0–0	0–0	2–1	1–2		1–1	1–0	1–4	1–7	2–1	0–2	2–2	0–3	2–0	3–0	1–5	0–3	2–2	0–1	4–1
Millwall	1–0	1–0	3–2	3–3	3–0	2–0	2–1	3–0	2–0		1–0	2–0	4–1	2–1	3–0	2–2	4–2	2–0	1–0	1–0	1–1	0–0	2–0	2–0
Oldham Athletic	2–2	1–1	1–0	2–0	3–1	5–3	1–4	2–2	1–1	0–2		3–0	2–4	0–2	2–2	1–3	0–1	1–0	1–0	1–1	1–2	0–1	1–1	3–0
Oxford United	2–1	2–0	0–0	1–0	0–1	0–4	2–0	0–2	4–1	3–1	3–3		1–0	1–3	2–0	0–3	0–1	3–2	2–2	0–3	7–1	1–2	0–2	4–1
Peterborough United	1–0	3–0	2–2	5–2	2–0	1–0	1–1	4–1	3–2	0–2	0–1	2–3		1–1	0–0	3–1	4–1	4–0	5–2	2–3	3–1	2–2	1–1	1–0
Queens Park Rangers	5–0	1–0	4–1	4–1	1–0	1–3	3–0	3–3	1–2	6–1	1–1	2–3	2–1		0–2	1–0	2–1	2–1	6–2	3–2	2–1	1–1	4–1	7–2
Reading	1–0	2–0	0–0	0–1	4–1	2–2	0–0	0–1	2–1	1–1	3–2	0–1	2–1	2–1		2–0	4–1	1–0	2–1	0–2	3–0	1–2	1–1	3–0
Scunthorpe United	3–0	3–2	2–2	3–0	2–1	0–1	2–2	2–4	0–1	4–4	1–1	1–2	1–1	1–2	2–0		1–4	0–0	1–1	2–1	4–2	1–1	4–1	4–1
Shrewsbury Town	0–2	0–0	3–1	1–0	4–0	2–1	3–1	2–2	2–1	2–0	3–1	4–0	3–1	0–0	3–3	1–4		3–0	5–0	1–1	1–2	0–0	1–1	4–1
Southend United	1–2	1–0	0–0	2–0	4–2	5–2	3–1	0–2	1–0	0–2	0–2	2–1	2–0	1–3	2–1	0–1	2–0		2–0	4–2	5–3	1–0	3–1	2–3
Swansea Town	5–0	1–1	2–2	3–0	1–0	0–3	1–0	4–2	1–2	0–2	4–1	3–2	1–1	4–2	5–4	3–4	4–0	5–0		1–1	1–0	4–2	1–6	7–2
Swindon Town	0–0	2–1	3–2	4–3	2–2	0–1	0–0	3–1	6–2	1–0	0–1	0–0	3–0	2–1	5–0	0–0	0–0	4–0	2–2		0–0	0–1	0–1	6–0
Walsall	2–1	1–1	2–1	1–1	1–1	6–1	1–0	2–4	2–1	1–4	2–2	1–1	2–0	0–1	3–0	3–0	3–0	3–0	1–1	5–0		3–0	1–1	2–0
Watford	1–0	1–1	0–1	2–0	3–0	1–0	1–1	1–1	2–1	0–1	4–0	1–1	1–0	1–2	1–2	2–1	1–0	4–1	0–1	2–0	0–1		1–2	3–2
Workington	2–2	1–1	1–0	0–0	6–1	1–0	1–0	3–0	2–0	0–0	0–1	2–1	1–1	1–1	1–0	1–2	1–3	3–1	7–0	0–3	1–0	1–0		2–1
York City	0–2	1–1	0–1	1–5	2–0	1–2	1–1	1–2	2–1	2–1	2–2	1–4	1–1	2–2	1–2	1–3	2–2	0–3	5–1	0–2	0–3	1–0	3–3	

Updated to match(es) played on unknown. Source: Ian Laschke: Rothmans Book of Football League Records 1888–89 to 1978–79. Macdonald and Jane's, London & Sydney, 1980.
Legend: Blue = home team win; Yellow = draw; Red = away team win.

=== Maps ===
Locations of the London-based Third Division teams
Locations of the Third Division teams

== Fourth Division ==
Football League Fourth Division
- Season: 1965–66
- Champions: Doncaster Rovers (1st title)
- Promoted: Colchester United, Darlington, Torquay United
- Failed re-election: none
- Matches: 552
- Goals: 1,723 (3.12 per match)
- Top goalscorer: Kevin Hector (Bradford Park Avenue), 44

Pos	Team	Pld	W	D	L	GF	GA	GAv	Pts	Promotion or relegation
1	Doncaster Rovers (C, P)	46	24	11	11	85	54	1.574	59	Promotion to the Third Division
2	Darlington (P)	46	25	9	12	72	53	1.358	59	Promotion to the Third Division
3	Torquay United (P)	46	24	10	12	72	49	1.469	58	Promotion to the Third Division
4	Colchester United (P)	46	23	10	13	70	47	1.489	56	Promotion to the Third Division
5	Tranmere Rovers	46	24	8	14	93	66	1.409	56	
6	Luton Town	46	24	8	14	90	70	1.286	56	
7	Chester	46	20	12	14	79	70	1.129	52	
8	Notts County	46	19	12	15	61	53	1.151	50	
9	Newport County	46	18	12	16	75	75	1.000	48	
10	Southport	46	18	12	16	68	69	0.986	48	
11	Bradford (Park Avenue)	46	21	5	20	102	92	1.109	47	
12	Barrow	46	16	15	15	72	76	0.947	47	
13	Stockport County	46	18	6	22	71	70	1.014	42	
14	Crewe Alexandra	46	16	9	21	61	63	0.968	41	
15	Halifax Town	46	15	11	20	67	75	0.893	41	
16	Barnsley	46	15	10	21	74	78	0.949	40	
17	Aldershot	46	15	10	21	75	84	0.893	40	
18	Hartlepools United	46	16	8	22	63	75	0.840	40	
19	Port Vale	46	15	9	22	48	59	0.814	39	
20	Chesterfield	46	13	13	20	62	78	0.795	39	
21	Rochdale	46	16	5	25	71	87	0.816	37	Re-elected
22	Lincoln City	46	13	11	22	57	82	0.695	37	Re-elected
23	Bradford City	46	12	13	21	63	94	0.670	37	Re-elected
24	Wrexham	46	13	9	24	72	104	0.692	35	Re-elected

Source: rsssf.com
(C) Champions; (P) Promoted

=== Results ===
Home \ Away	ALD	BAR	BRW	BRA	BPA	CHE	CHF	COL	CRE	DAR	DON	HAL	HAR	LIN	LUT	NPC	NTC	PTV	ROC	SOU	STP	TOR	TRA	WRE
Aldershot		1–1	3–1	5–2	5–1	2–2	1–3	1–3	1–0	0–1	1–1	0–0	5–0	2–0	3–1	2–1	0–0	3–0	2–3	3–0	1–0	3–2	1–3	2–2
Barnsley	2–1		3–0	4–2	1–1	0–2	0–0	1–1	0–1	3–1	1–5	1–2	2–2	0–1	3–0	2–2	1–1	1–0	5–0	4–0	1–2	1–0	4–0	3–0
Barrow	2–2	1–5		2–0	5–2	4–1	3–2	3–0	1–1	1–1	2–1	3–0	2–0	2–2	0–1	2–2	2–1	2–2	0–2	3–3	1–0	2–0	1–1	4–2
Bradford City	1–1	1–0	0–0		3–0	1–2	1–1	1–2	0–1	2–0	1–1	0–1	1–3	2–0	2–2	3–2	0–4	2–0	2–1	3–0	1–7	4–1	2–4	4–1
Bradford Park Avenue	5–1	7–2	2–3	5–1		0–1	3–1	1–0	2–1	0–2	0–1	2–1	4–1	4–2	1–3	6–1	4–0	1–2	1–2	2–1	3–1	1–1	1–1	4–2
Chester	3–2	3–3	0–0	4–0	2–4		3–0	2–1	3–0	3–2	1–4	1–0	2–0	4–2	1–1	6–1	1–1	2–0	1–2	1–0	1–0	1–1	3–1	4–2
Chesterfield	1–1	3–1	2–2	1–1	0–3	2–2		2–4	3–1	1–2	1–1	3–2	1–3	1–0	1–3	1–2	0–0	3–1	4–1	3–2	2–1	1–1	0–0	1–1
Colchester United	0–0	4–0	2–2	0–1	6–3	1–1	3–0		1–1	0–1	2–1	1–0	2–0	3–0	2–2	3–2	4–1	3–0	2–0	0–0	3–2	0–2	2–1	1–1
Crewe Alexandra	2–0	0–1	2–1	7–1	2–5	1–1	1–0	0–2		0–1	0–1	3–0	3–1	7–0	2–0	2–2	1–0	0–0	3–1	2–1	1–1	2–1	1–2	0–1
Darlington	4–3	2–1	1–0	3–0	4–1	0–1	4–1	2–0	1–1		3–2	2–0	1–1	0–2	1–0	0–1	1–0	2–1	3–1	2–0	3–0	0–0	0–1	2–0
Doncaster Rovers	3–2	2–1	1–1	1–1	6–2	1–1	1–0	2–0	4–1	6–3		2–2	4–0	4–0	1–1	1–0	0–3	1–0	2–0	1–1	1–0	0–1	3–1	2–0
Halifax Town	3–4	2–2	2–1	3–2	1–0	2–0	4–1	1–1	1–0	2–2	2–3		1–0	2–2	3–0	4–4	0–1	2–0	4–1	1–2	0–1	0–2	2–2	4–0
Hartlepools United	3–0	1–2	3–0	1–1	2–3	2–0	1–2	0–1	4–1	1–1	2–0	1–2		3–1	2–0	5–2	2–0	2–0	0–0	3–1	2–1	0–2	0–0	4–2
Lincoln City	2–1	4–1	4–0	1–0	1–1	2–2	0–2	0–2	1–1	4–1	0–3	3–3	2–1		2–2	1–1	1–2	0–1	2–0	4–0	1–2	1–1	1–0	0–2
Luton Town	3–1	5–4	3–2	2–3	3–1	5–2	1–2	1–1	4–0	2–0	4–3	4–1	2–1	0–0		2–1	5–1	5–0	4–1	2–0	2–0	3–2	2–1	1–0
Newport County	3–1	1–0	3–2	2–2	3–1	3–2	3–4	2–1	1–0	3–0	4–0	3–1	3–0	0–0	3–1		1–2	0–1	1–1	1–1	1–0	3–2	0–0	2–2
Notts County	2–0	0–1	0–2	2–1	2–0	3–3	2–0	1–0	0–1	0–0	1–2	1–1	1–0	2–1	1–1	1–1		3–1	3–3	1–2	1–1	1–1	1–2	3–1
Port Vale	2–1	1–1	0–0	0–0	3–3	5–2	1–1	1–0	2–0	3–1	0–1	2–0	0–0	3–0	1–2	3–0	0–1		2–1	4–1	2–0	0–0	2–3	1–0
Rochdale	1–0	2–1	4–0	5–1	2–3	3–0	1–1	0–1	2–1	1–2	0–1	0–1	3–1	0–1	1–2	2–1	0–2	1–0		3–0	4–0	2–3	3–5	6–0
Southport	0–2	3–1	1–1	4–0	2–1	2–0	1–0	0–1	1–1	1–1	2–1	1–0	4–1	5–1	3–2	2–0	1–0	2–1	4–0		2–0	3–3	1–1	2–2
Stockport County	1–2	1–0	5–2	1–1	2–3	0–1	2–1	1–0	2–0	1–1	1–1	3–0	1–2	2–1	4–1	2–1	1–3	3–0	3–1	2–2		1–0	1–2	2–4
Torquay United	5–1	3–0	0–1	4–3	2–1	1–0	2–0	0–1	2–1	0–4	0–0	1–0	2–0	4–1	2–0	1–0	2–0	1–0	4–0	1–1	1–4		2–1	3–1
Tranmere Rovers	5–2	1–0	1–2	2–2	1–2	1–0	3–2	2–0	3–1	1–2	1–0	5–2	6–1	3–2	2–0	0–1	0–3	1–0	6–2	0–2	6–2	0–1		6–3
Wrexham	4–0	6–3	3–1	1–1	3–2	2–1	2–1	2–3	1–4	1–2	4–3	2–2	1–1	0–1	2–0	0–1	1–3	1–0	2–2	3–1	1–4	0–2	1–5	

Updated to match(es) played on unknown. Source: Ian Laschke: Rothmans Book of Football League Records 1888–89 to 1978–79. Macdonald and Jane's, London & Sydney, 1980.
Legend: Blue = home team win; Yellow = draw; Red = away team win.
- During Chester's home game against Aldershot on New Year's Day 1966, both Chester full-backs (Ray Jones & Bryn Jones) broke their left leg.

=== Maps ===
Locations of the London-based Fourth Division teams
Locations of the Fourth Division teams

== Attendances ==
=== First Division ===
#	Football club	Home games	Average attendance
1	Liverpool FC	21	46,344
2	Manchester United	21	38,769
3	Everton FC	21	38,498
4	Tottenham Hotspur	21	38,320
5	Leeds United	21	35,785
6	Sunderland AFC	21	34,488
7	Newcastle United	21	33,793
8	Chelsea FC	21	31,346
9	Arsenal FC	21	29,036
10	West Ham United	21	24,836
11	Nottingham Forest	21	23,725
12	Stoke City	21	22,503
13	Sheffield Wednesday	21	22,366
14	Leicester City	21	22,325
15	Fulham FC	21	21,138
16	Aston Villa	21	21,063
17	Burnley FC	21	19,968
18	West Bromwich Albion	21	19,834
19	Sheffield United	21	19,405
20	Northampton Town	21	18,634
21	Blackpool FC	21	16,185
22	Blackburn Rovers	21	13,513

=== Second Division ===
#	Football club	Home games	Average attendance
1	Manchester City FC	21	27,739
2	Coventry City FC	21	25,370
3	Wolverhampton Wanderers FC	21	22,361
4	Southampton FC	21	18,917
5	Huddersfield Town AFC	21	18,322
6	Bristol City FC	21	17,297
7	Norwich City FC	21	14,983
8	Crystal Palace FC	21	14,809
9	Portsmouth FC	21	14,644
10	Birmingham City FC	21	14,398
11	Derby County FC	21	14,151
12	Preston North End FC	21	14,023
13	Middlesbrough FC	21	13,450
14	Plymouth Argyle FC	21	13,217
15	Ipswich Town FC	21	12,473
16	Charlton Athletic FC	21	12,271
17	Carlisle United FC	21	12,067
18	Bolton Wanderers FC	21	12,005
19	Cardiff City FC	21	11,005
20	Rotherham United FC	21	10,096
21	Bury FC	21	7,667
22	Leyton Orient FC	21	7,378

=== Third Division ===
#	Football club	Home games	Average attendance
1	Hull City AFC	21	22,828
2	Millwall FC	21	13,978
3	Swindon Town FC	21	13,125
4	Brighton & Hove Albion FC	21	12,799
5	Oxford United FC	21	9,301
6	Walsall FC	21	9,297
7	Bristol Rovers FC	21	9,007
8	Oldham Athletic FC	21	8,943
9	Reading FC	21	8,857
10	Brentford FC	21	8,416
11	Queens Park Rangers FC	21	8,263
12	Watford FC	21	7,695
13	Swansea City AFC	21	7,694
14	Southend United FC	21	7,536
15	Gillingham FC	21	7,492
16	Grimsby Town FC	21	7,239
17	Peterborough United FC	21	7,238
18	AFC Bournemouth	21	6,329
19	Mansfield Town FC	21	6,087
20	York City FC	21	5,921
21	Exeter City FC	21	5,590
22	Scunthorpe United FC	21	5,181
23	Workington AFC	21	3,263

=== Fourth Division ===
#	Football club	Home games	Average attendance
1	Doncaster Rovers FC	21	10,398
2	Chester City FC	21	8,504
3	Tranmere Rovers	21	8,031
4	Darlington FC	21	7,953
5	Stockport County FC	21	7,802
6	Luton Town FC	21	7,675
7	Torquay United FC	21	6,208
8	Port Vale FC	21	6,015
9	Wrexham AFC	21	5,567
10	Bradford Park Avenue AFC	21	5,287
11	Colchester United FC	21	5,151
12	Chesterfield FC	21	4,995
13	Notts County FC	21	4,949
14	Hartlepool United FC	21	4,842
15	Barrow AFC	21	4,701
16	Barnsley FC	21	4,510
17	Southport FC	21	4,257
18	Bradford City AFC	21	4,025
19	Crewe Alexandra FC	21	3,873
20	Lincoln City FC	21	3,845
21	Aldershot Town FC	21	3,825
22	Halifax Town AFC	21	3,069
23	Rochdale AFC	21	2,974
24	Newport County AFC	21	2,636

== See also ==
- 1965-66 in English football
