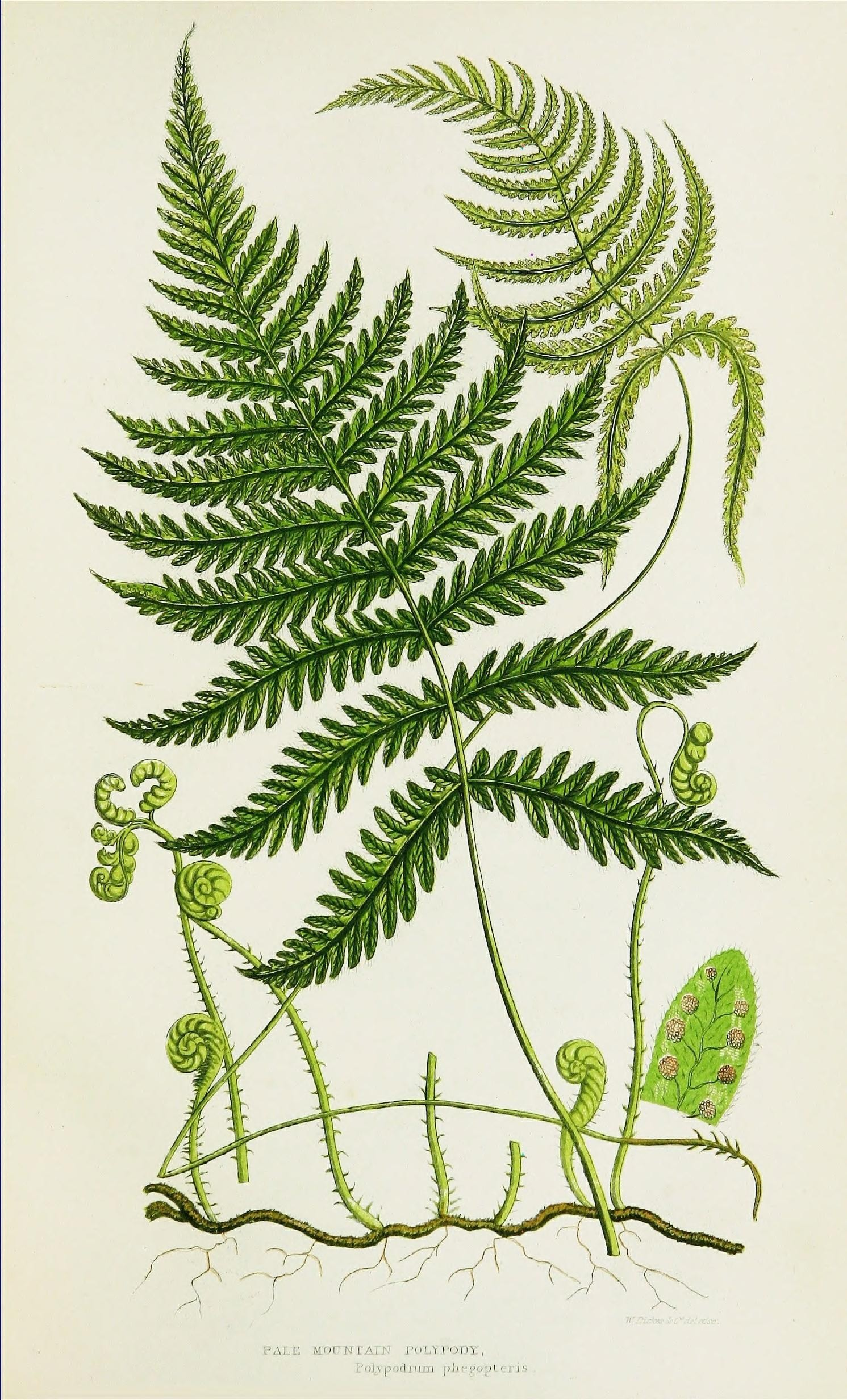
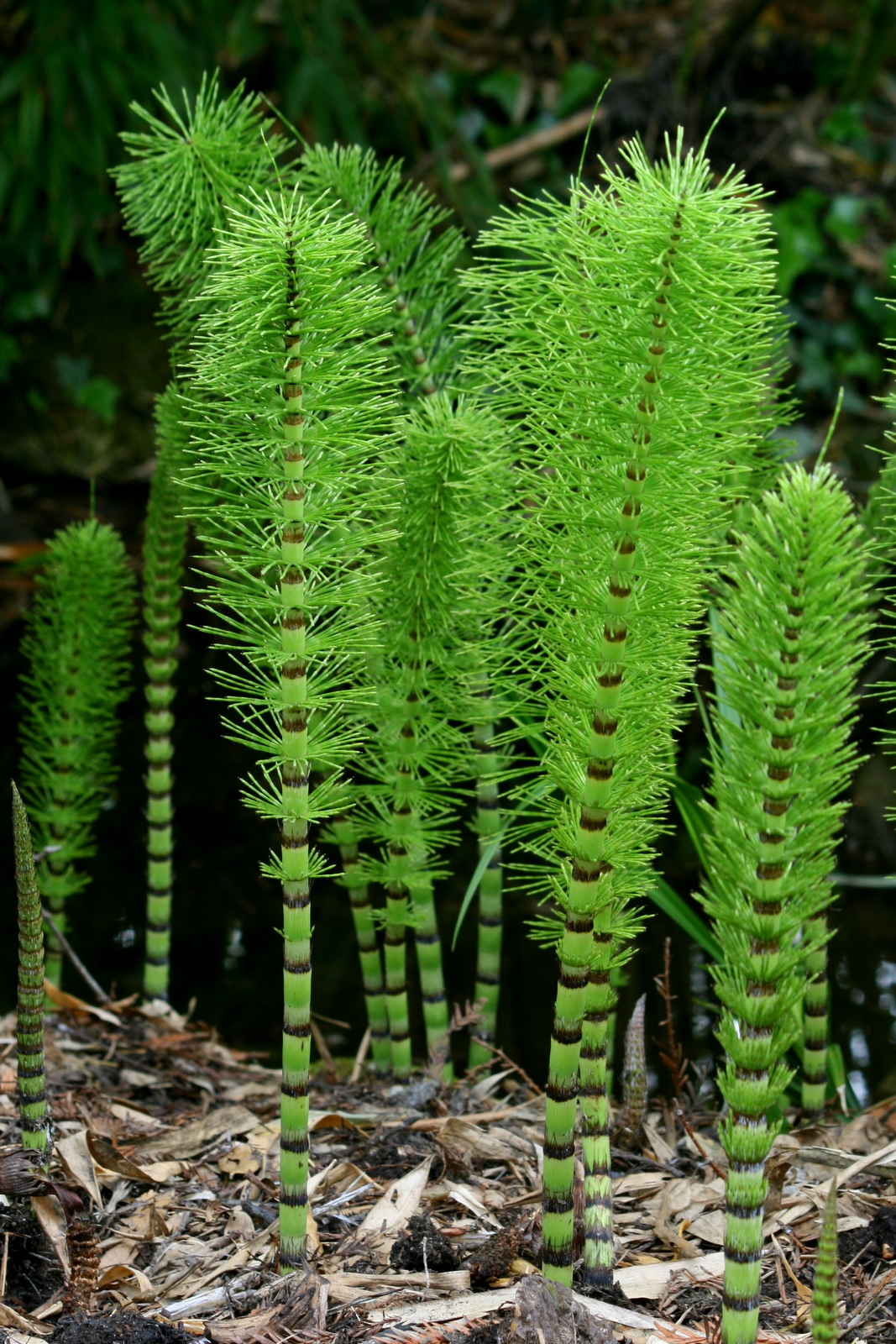
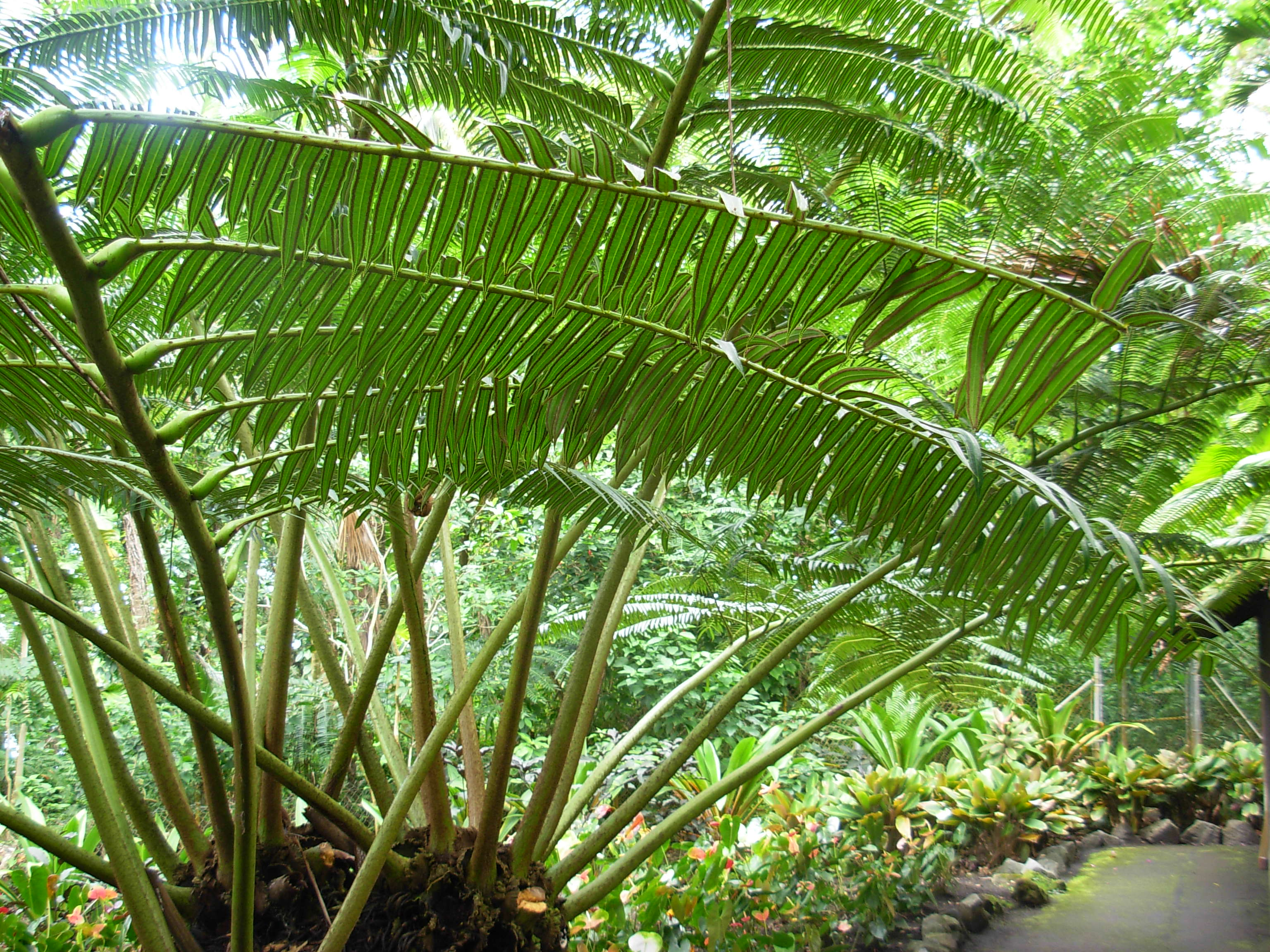
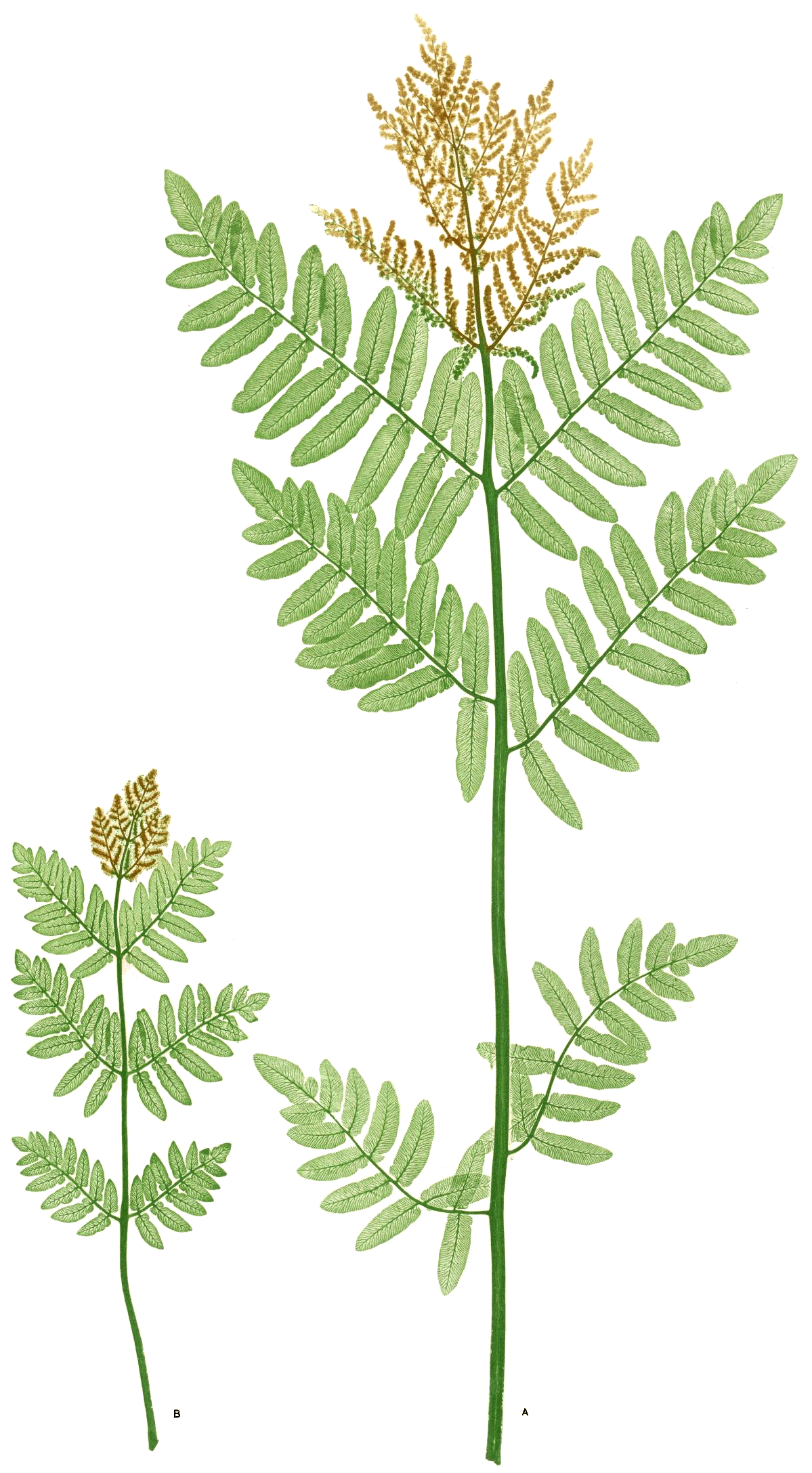
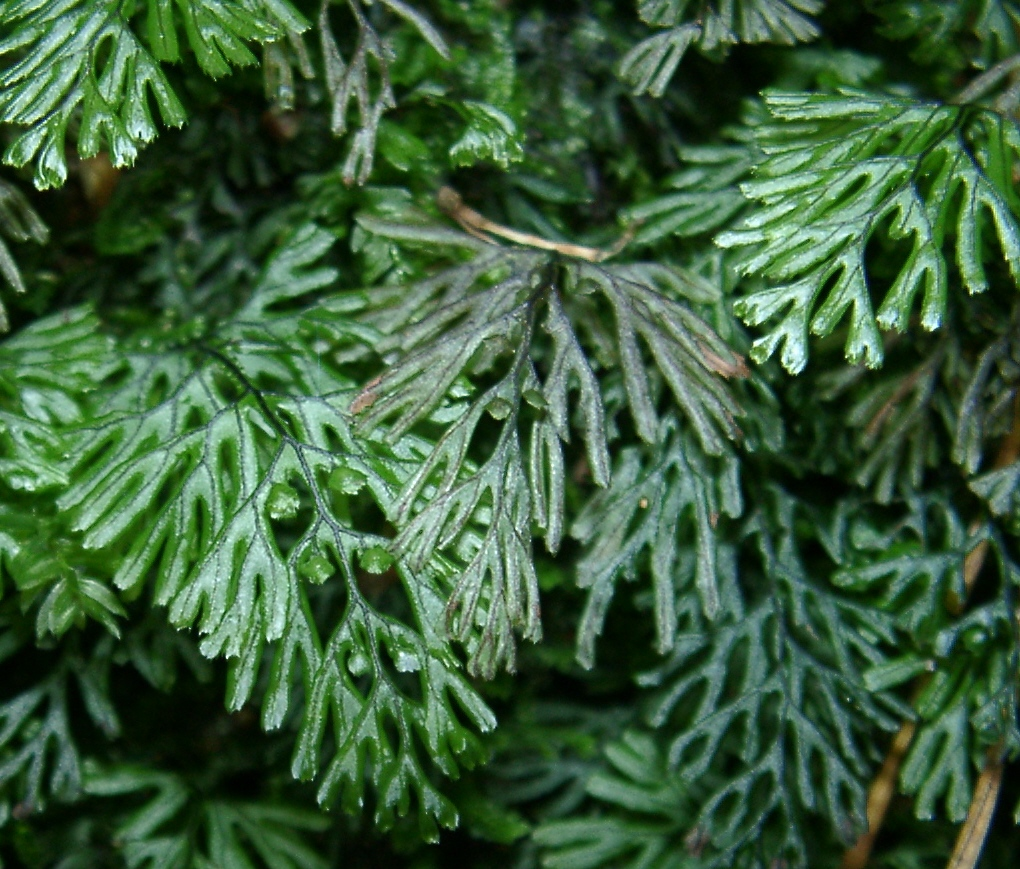
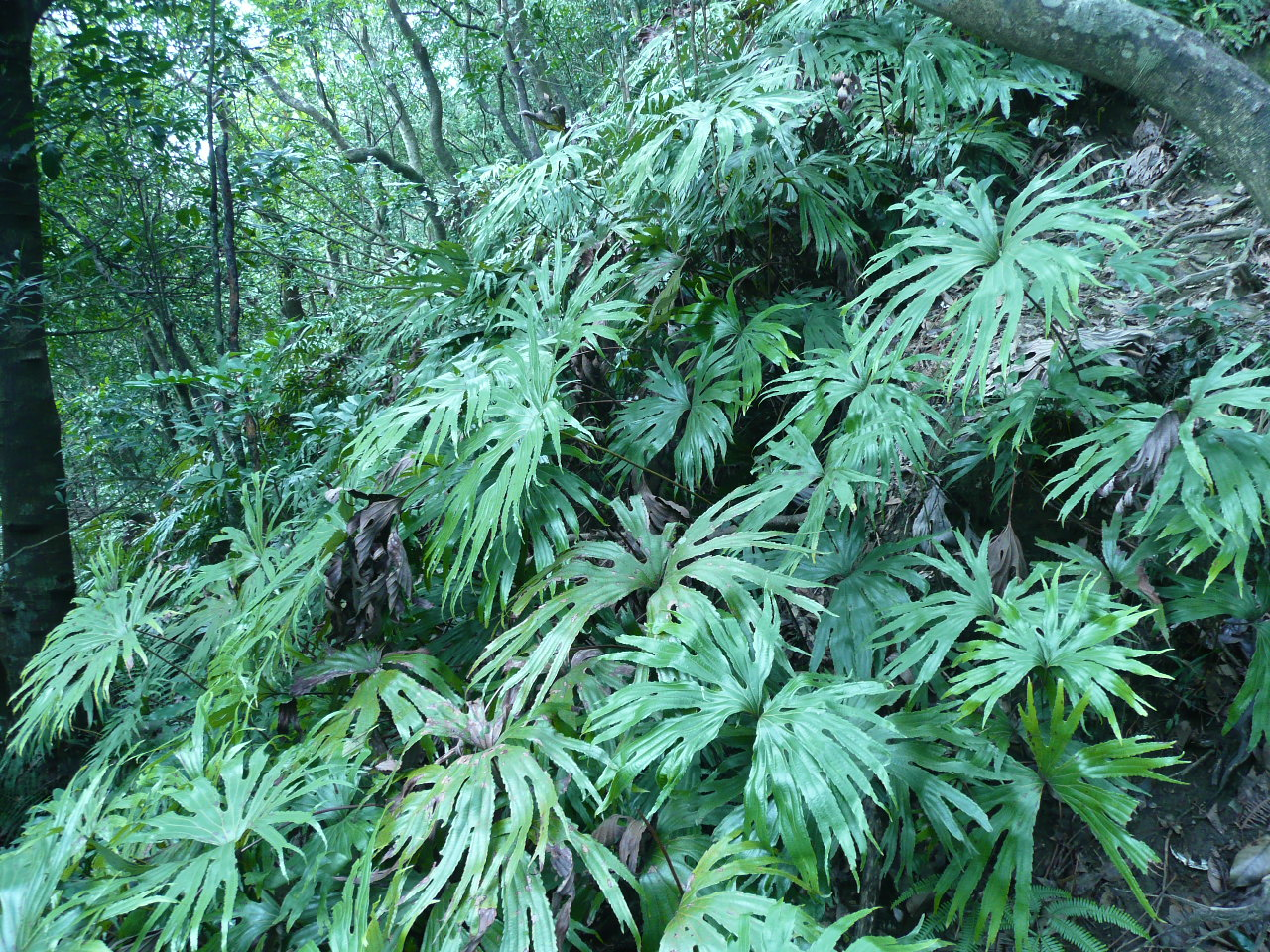
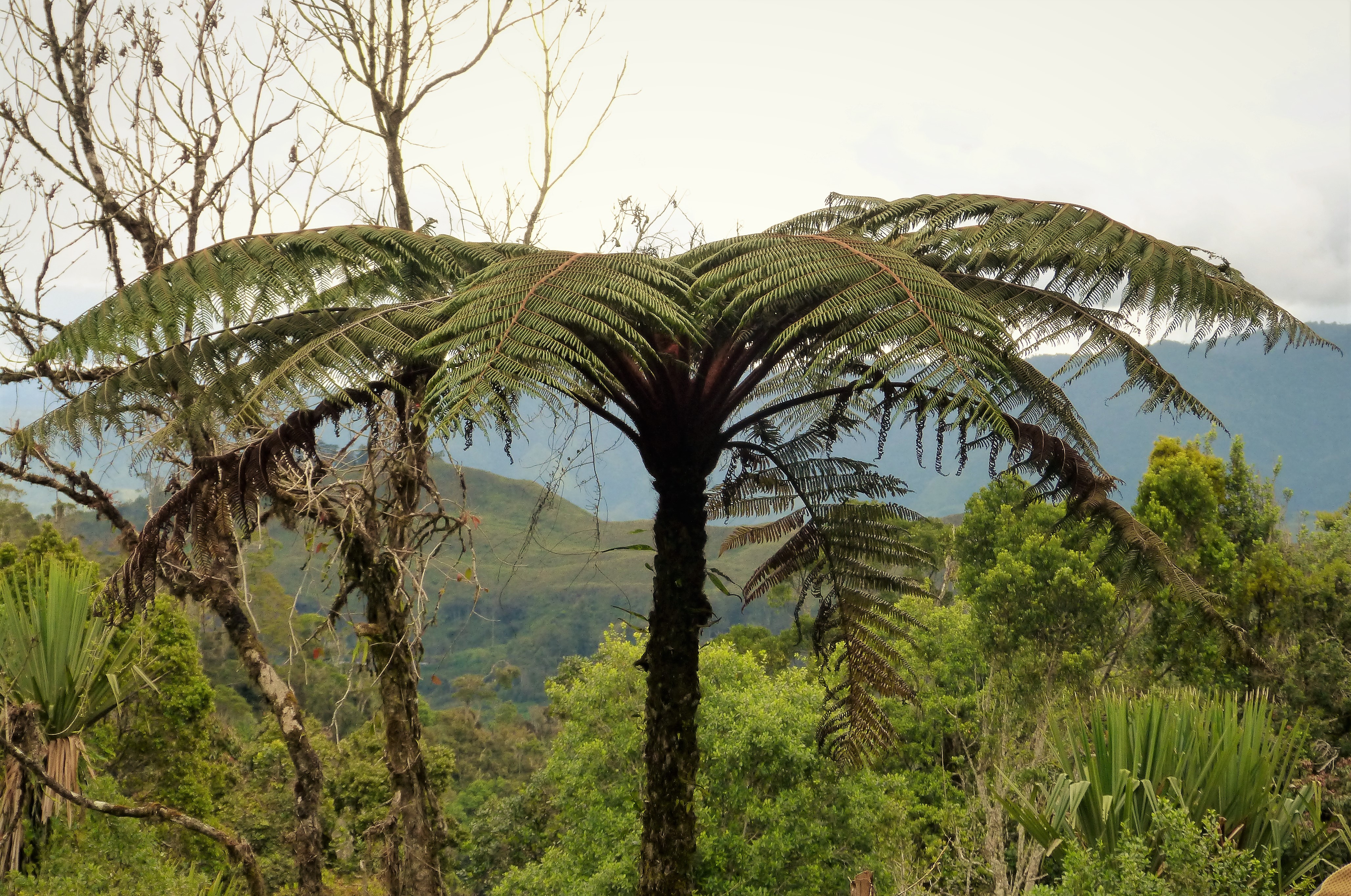
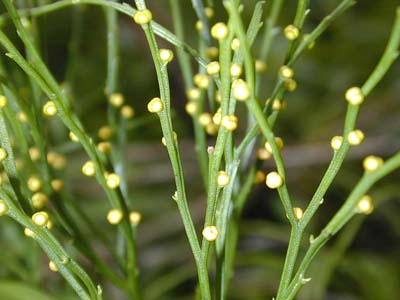
- Polypodiales Equisetales Marattiales Osmundales Hymenophyllales Gleicheniales Cyatheales Psilotales

Scientific classification
- Kingdom: Plantae
- Clade: Tracheophytes
- Division: Polypodiophyta
- Class: Polypodiopsida; Cronquist, Takht. & W.Zimm.

Subclasses
- †Stauropterididae; †Zygopterididae; Equisetidae; Marattiidae; Ophioglossidae; Polypodiidae

Synonyms
- Filicatae Kubitski 1990; Filices; Filicophyta Endlicher 1836; Monilophyta Cantino & Donoghue 2007; Pteridopsida Ritgen 1828

= Fern =

Ferns Temporal range: Middle Devonian – Present

Class of vascular plants

Ferns (Polypodiopsida or Polypodiophyta) are a group of vascular plants (Note: Vascular plants are land plants with vascular tissues such as xylem and phloem, which transport water and sugar, respectively. Additionally, the branched sporophyte is the dominant phase of the vascular-plant life cycle. Non-vascular plants like mosses, hornworts, and liverworts lack these features.) that reproduce via spores and have neither seeds nor flowers. They reproduce in two phases, a short-lived gametophyte that reproduces sexually to develop a spore-bearing leaf structure. Some ferns produce coiled fiddleheads, which expand into fronds.

The group includes over 10,500 extant species. The Polypodiopsida consist of both the leptosporangiate (Polypodiidae) and eusporangiate ferns, the latter group including horsetails, whisk ferns, marattioid ferns and ophioglossoid ferns. The fern crown group is estimated to have originated c. 423 million years ago (mya), during the late Silurian period and the rapid radiation of land plants, but Polypodiales, the group that makes up 80% of living fern diversity, did not appear and diversify until the Cretaceous (c. 143 to 66 mya), contemporaneous with the heightened diversification of flowering plants.

Some fern species, such as bracken (Pteridium aquilinum) and water fern (Azolla filiculoides), are significant weeds worldwide, and brackens are carcinogenic. Ferns are not of major economic importance, but some are used as food, medicine, and ornamental plants. They also play a role in human culture.

== Description ==
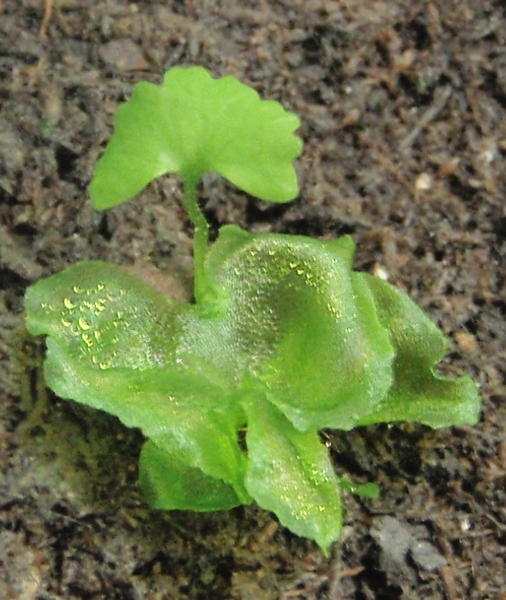
New Onoclea sensibilis stalk emerging from the prothallus

The life cycle of a fern occurs in two stages (as in clubmosses and horsetails). Firstly, each active spore germinates into a short-lived gamete-producing gametophyte, known as the prothallus, which is anchored to the ground by rhizoids. Secondly, a sporophyte, which is free-living and only briefly dependent on the maternal gametophyte, develops spores on fertile fronds. As in all vascular plants, the sporophyte is the dominant phase of the alternation of generations expressed by all land plants. Ferns differ from seed plants in their reproduction by spore dispersal and lack of flowers and seeds. Ferns differ from spore-bearing lycophytes by having true leaves, which are often pinnate.

In more detail, after spores settle on the soil, they germinate to form initial rhizoids and protonemata, which develop into a free-living haploid gametophyte by mitosis (a process of cell division which maintains the number of chromosomes). Using mitosis, the gametophyte (the prothallus) produces spherical antheridia containing male gametophytes (i.e. sperm or antherozoids) and archegonia, which release a single oosphere (egg cell). The flagellate sperm swims into the archegonium and fertilizes the egg, which remains attached to the prothallus as it grows by mitosis into a diploid zygote that develops into the sporophyte, while the separate prothallus persists briefly. Finally, the sporophyte undergoes a diploid phase in which it produces haploid spores by meiosis (a process of cell division which reduces the number of chromosomes by a half), and a mature frond releases spores from the sori (clusters of spore-enclosing sporangia) on its underside.

The diploid sporophyte has 2n paired chromosomes, where n varies from species to species. The haploid gametophyte has n unpaired chromosomes, i.e. half the number of the sporophyte. Sometimes a gametophyte can give rise to sporophyte traits like roots or sporangia independently from the sporophyte.

=== Gametophyte ===
The gametophytes of ferns are very different from those of seed plants (gymnosperms and angiosperms). They are free-living and resemble liverworts, whereas those of seed plants develop within the spore wall and are dependent on the parent sporophyte for their nutrition. A fern gametophyte typically consists of:

- Prothallus: A green, photosynthetic structure, the initial growth of which is planar in one cell layer. It resembles a heart or kidney in shape and measures 3–10 millimetres (1/8–3/8 inch) by 2–8 mm. The prothallus produces gametes by means of:
  - Antheridia: Small spherical structures that produce flagellate antherozoids.
  - Archegonia: A flask-shaped structure that produces a single egg at one end, which the male gametophyte reaches by swimming down the neck.
- Rhizoids: root-like structures (not true roots) that consist of single greatly elongated cells that absorb water and mineral salts over the whole structure. Rhizoids anchor the prothallus to the soil.

=== Sporophyte ===
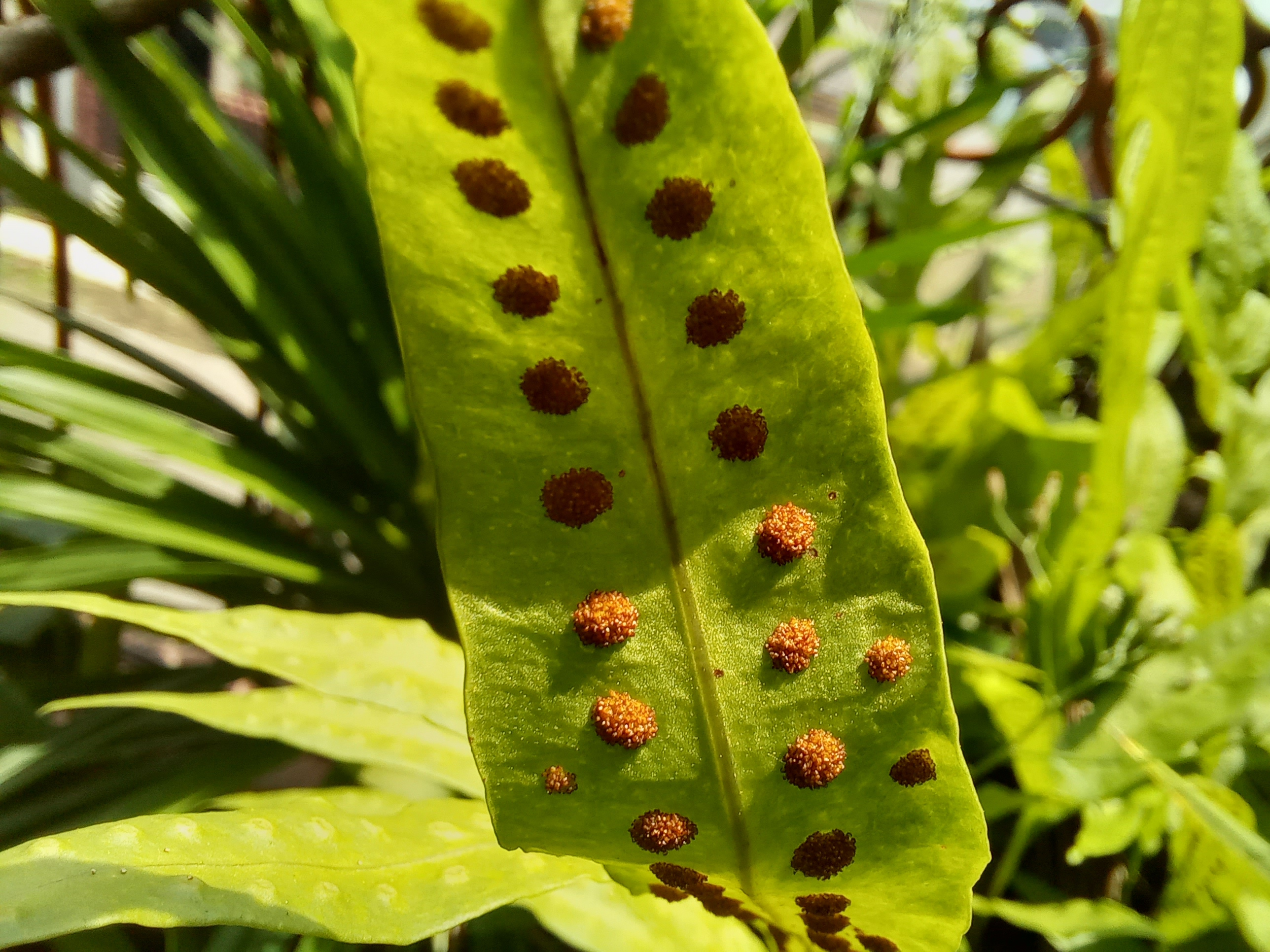
Sori of monarch fern contain clusters of sporangia.

Extant ferns are herbaceous perennial plants and most lack woody growth. When woody growth is present, it is found in the stem. Their foliage may be deciduous or evergreen, and some are semi-evergreen depending on the climate. Like the sporophytes of seed plants, those of ferns consist of stems, leaves, and roots. Ferns differ from spermatophytes in that they reproduce by spores rather than by seeds. However, they also differ from spore-producing bryophytes in that, like seed plants, they are polysporangiophytes, their sporophytes branching and producing many sporangia. Unlike those of bryophytes, fern sporophytes are free-living and only briefly dependent on the maternal gametophyte.

The green, photosynthetic part of the plant is technically a megaphyll (more complex than the microphylls of clubmosses) and in ferns, it is often called a frond. In leptosporangiate ferns, new leaves typically expand by the unrolling of a tight spiral called a crozier or fiddlehead into fronds. This uncurling of the leaf is termed circinate vernation. In some families, such as the Blechnaceae, the leaves are divided into two types, sporophylls or fertile fronds that produce spores and trophophylls or sterile fronds that do not. Fern spores are borne in sporangia which are usually clustered to form sori. The sporangia may be covered with a protective coating called an indusium. The arrangement of the sporangia is important in classification.

In monomorphic ferns, the fertile and sterile leaves look morphologically the same, and both are able to photosynthesize. In hemidimorphic ferns, just a portion of the fertile leaf is different from the sterile leaves. In dimorphic (holomorphic) ferns, the two types of leaves are morphologically distinct. The fertile leaves are much narrower than the sterile leaves, and may have no green tissue at all, as in the Blechnaceae and Lomariopsidaceae.

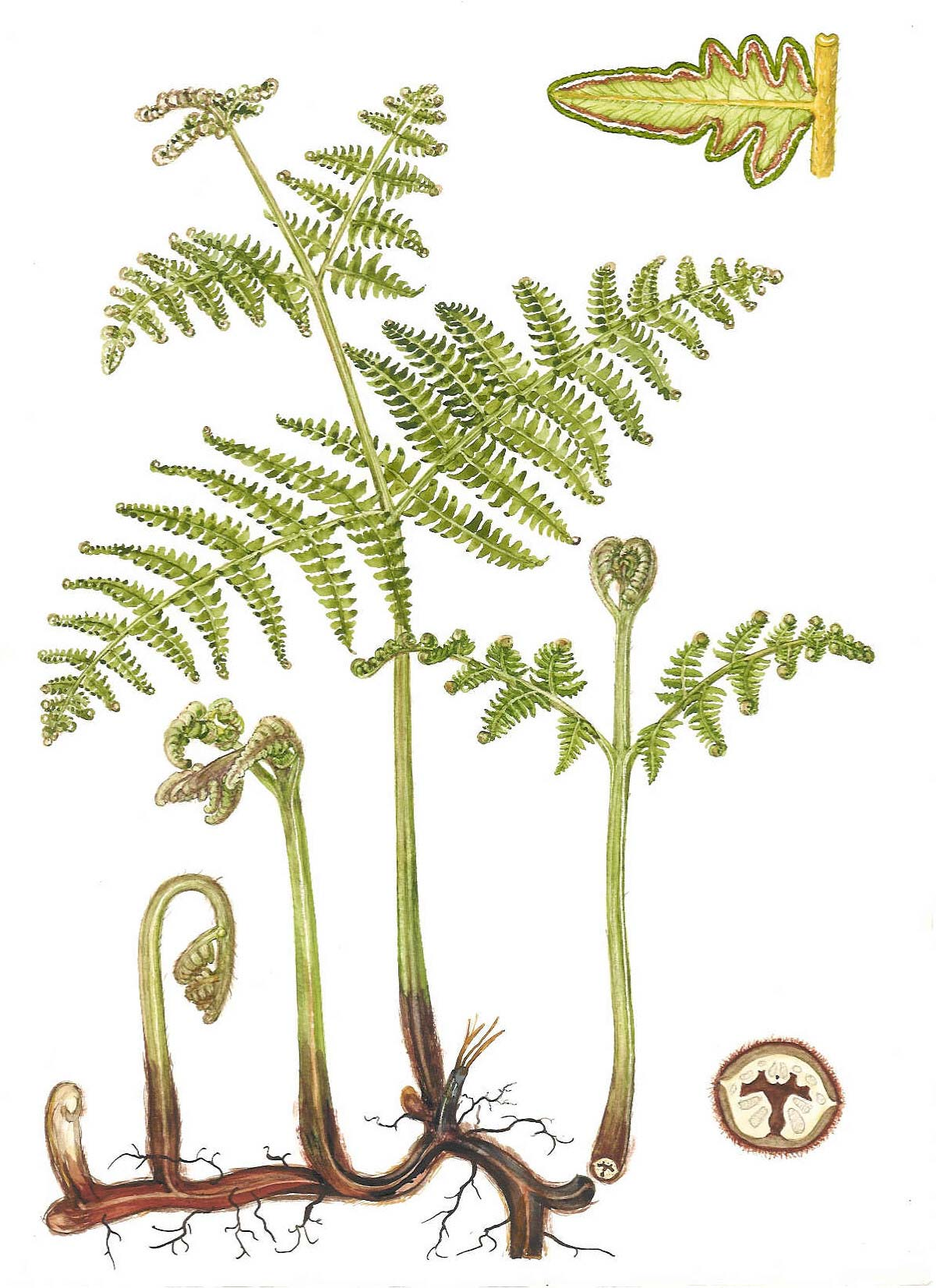
Croziers, fronds, and rhizomes of bracken. In this species the stems grow underground, allowing the plant to spread horizontally.

The anatomy of fern leaves can be anywhere from simple to highly divided, or even indeterminate (e.g. Gleicheniaceae, Lygodiaceae). The divided forms are pinnate, where the leaf segments are completely separated from one other, or pinnatifid (partially pinnate), where the leaf segments are still partially connected. When the fronds are branched more than once, it can also be a combination of the pinnatifid are pinnate shapes. If the leaf blades are divided twice, the plant has bipinnate fronds, and tripinnate fronds if they branch three times, and all the way to tetra- and pentapinnate fronds. In tree ferns, the main stalk that connects the leaf to the stem (known as the stipe), often has multiple leaflets. The leafy structures that grow from the stipe are known as pinnae and are often again divided into smaller pinnules.

Fern stems are often loosely called rhizomes, even though they grow underground only in some of the species. Epiphytic species and many of the terrestrial ones have above-ground creeping stolons growing from the rhizome (e.g., Polypodiaceae), and many groups have dense, erect above-ground trunks (e.g., Cyatheaceae, the scaly tree ferns). These can reach up to 20 meters (66 ft) tall in a few species (e.g., Cyathea brownii on Norfolk Island and Cyathea medullaris in New Zealand).

Roots are underground non-photosynthetic structures that take up water and nutrients from soil. They are always fibrous and are structurally very similar to the roots of seed plants.

=== Similar species ===
Many unrelated species are called ferns and sometimes confused with them, including:

- Asparagus fern – any of several species of flowering plants in the monocot genus Asparagus.
- Sweetfern – a flowering shrub of the genus Comptonia
- Fern bush (Chamaebatiaria millefolium) – a rose-family shrub with fernlike leaves
- Fern tree (Jacaranda mimosifolia) – an ornamental tree of the order Lamiales
- Fern leaf tree (Filicium decipiens) – an ornamental tree of the order Sapindales
- Air fern – a group hydrozoans distantly related to jellyfish and corals that are harvested and dried for sale as an artificial plant

Additionally, some flowering plants such as palms and members of the carrot family have pinnate leaves that somewhat resemble fern fronds. However, these plants have fully developed seeds contained in fruits, rather than the microscopic spores of ferns. Cycads, which are gymnosperms, also have pinnate leaves that somewhat resemble fern fronds.

== Taxonomy ==
Carl Linnaeus (1753) originally recognized 15 genera of ferns and fern allies, classifying them in class Cryptogamia in two groups, Filices (e.g. Polypodium) and Musci (mosses). By 1806 this had increased to 38 genera, and has progressively increased since. Ferns were traditionally classified in the class Filices, and later in a division of the plant kingdom named Pteridophyta or Filicophyta. Pteridophyta is no longer recognised as a valid taxon because it is paraphyletic. The ferns are also referred to as Polypodiophyta or, when treated as a subdivision of Tracheophyta (vascular plants), Polypodiopsida, although this name sometimes only refers to leptosporangiate ferns. Traditionally, all of the spore producing vascular plants were informally denominated the pteridophytes, rendering the term synonymous with ferns and fern allies. This can be confusing because members of the division Pteridophyta were also denominated pteridophytes (sensu stricto).

Traditionally, three discrete groups have been denominated ferns: two groups of eusporangiate ferns, the families Ophioglossaceae (adder's tongues, moonworts, and grape ferns) and Marattiaceae, and the leptosporangiate ferns. The Marattiaceae are a primitive group of tropical ferns with large, fleshy rhizomes and are now thought to be a sibling taxon to the leptosporangiate ferns. Several other groups of species were considered fern allies: the clubmosses, spikemosses, and quillworts in Lycopodiophyta; the whisk ferns of Psilotaceae; and the horsetails of Equisetaceae. Since this grouping is polyphyletic, the term fern allies should be abandoned, except in a historical context. More recent genetic studies demonstrated that the Lycopodiophyta are more distantly related to other vascular plants, having radiated evolutionarily at the base of the vascular plant clade, while both the whisk ferns and horsetails are as closely related to leptosporangiate ferns as the ophioglossoid ferns and Marattiaceae. In fact, the whisk ferns and ophioglossoid ferns are demonstrably a clade, and the horsetails and Marattiaceae are arguably another clade.

=== Molecular phylogenetics ===
The ferns are related to other groups as shown in the following cladogram:

- Tracheophyta (vascular plants)
  - Lycophytes
  - Euphyllophyta
    - Ferns
    - Spermatophyta (seed plants)
      - Gymnosperms
      - Angiosperms

Smith et al. (2006) carried out the first higher-level pteridophyte classification published in the molecular phylogenetic era. Their study recovered a clade containing all extant ferns (leptosporangiate ferns and eusporangiate ferns), as well as two groups whose placement had varied historically, the whisk ferns and the horsetails. They did not apply a formal taxonomic name to this group (noting that infradivision Moniliformopses was not a validly published name), referring to them simply as the "monilophytes". They noted that features of the spermatozoids and roots supported the placement of the otherwise morphologically divergent horsetails.

=== Nomenclature and subdivision ===
The leptosporangiate ferns are sometimes called "true ferns". This group includes most plants familiarly known as ferns. Modern research supports older ideas based on morphology that the Osmundaceae diverged early in the evolutionary history of the leptosporangiate ferns; in certain ways this family is intermediate between the eusporangiate ferns and the leptosporangiate ferns. Rai and Graham (2010) broadly supported the primary groups, but queried their relationships, concluding that "at present perhaps the best that can be said about all relationships among the major lineages of monilophytes in current studies is that we do not understand them very well". Grewe et al. (2013) confirmed the inclusion of horsetails within ferns sensu lato, but also suggested that uncertainties remained in their precise placement. Other classifications have raised Ophioglossales to the rank of a fifth class, separating the whisk ferns and ophioglossoid ferns.

The classification of Smith et al. in 2006 divided the monilophytes (ferns) into four classes:

- Psilotopsida – 2 orders (whisk ferns and ophioglossoid ferns) ~92 species
- Equisetopsida (Sphenopsida) – 1 order, Equisetales (horsetails) ~ 15 species
- Marattiopsida – 1 order, Marattiales ~ 150 species
- Polypodiopsida (Filicopsida) – 7 orders (leptosporangiate ferns) ~ 9,000 species

They further subdivided the 11 orders into 37 families. Their phylogeny recovered the Psilotopsida as sister to the rest of the clade, the three classes of which formed a polytomy.

Subsequently, Mark Wayne Chase and James L. Reveal ranked both lycopods and ferns as subclasses of a class Equisetopsida (Embryophyta) encompassing all land plants. This is referred to as Equisetopsida sensu lato to distinguish it from the narrower use to refer to horsetails alone, Equisetopsida sensu stricto. They placed the lycopods into subclass Lycopodiidae and the ferns, keeping the term monilophytes, into five subclasses, Equisetidae, Ophioglossidae, Psilotidae, Marattiidae and Polypodiidae, by dividing Smith's Psilotopsida into its two orders and elevating them to subclass (Ophioglossidae and Psilotidae). In 2011, Maarten J. M. Christenhusz et al. followed this use of subclasses but recombined Smith's class Psilotopsida as subclass Ophioglossidae, giving four subclasses of ferns again. The use of these four subclasses for all extant ferns has continued in subsequent fern classifications, such as that of Christenhusz and Chase (2014), which referred to the ferns as the unranked group Polypodiophyta, and the Pteridophyte Phylogeny Group classification of 2016 (PPG I), which places ferns in class Polypodiopsida. Classification of ferns at lower levels (particularly families and genera) remains unresolved and controversial with competing viewpoints (splitting vs lumping) between the systems of the PPG on the one hand and Christenhusz and Chase on the other, respectively. In 2018, Christenhusz and Chase explicitly argued against recognizing as many genera as PPG I.

Comparison of fern subdivisions in some classifications
Smith et al. (2006)	Chase & Reveal (2009)	Christenhusz et al. (2011)	Christenhusz & Chase (2014, 2018)	PPG I (2016)
ferns (no rank)	monilophytes (no rank)	ferns (monilophytes) (no rank)	ferns (Polypodiophyta) (no rank)	Class Polypodiopsida
Class Equisetopsida	Subclass Equisetidae	Subclass Equisetidae	Subclass Equisetidae	Subclass Equisetidae
Class Psilotopsida	Subclass Ophioglossidae; Subclass Psilotidae	Subclass Ophioglossidae	Subclass Ophioglossidae	Subclass Ophioglossidae
Class Marattiopsida	Subclass Marattiidae	Subclass Marattiidae	Subclass Marattiidae	Subclass Marattiidae
Class Polypodiopsida	Subclass Polypodiidae	Subclass Polypodiidae	Subclass Polypodiidae	Subclass Polypodiidae

The Smith system was a consensus of a number of studies, and was further refined. The phylogenetic relationships are shown in the following cladogram (to the level of orders). This division into four major clades was then confirmed using morphology alone.

- Tracheophyta
  - Lycopodiophytes (club mosses, spike mosses, quillworts)
  - Euphyllophytes
    - Spermatophytes (seed plants)
    - Ferns
      - - Equisetopsida
          - Equisetales (horsetails)
        - Psilotopsida
          - Ophioglossales (grapeferns etc.)
          - Psilotales (whisk ferns)
      - - Marattiopsida
          - Marattiales
        - Polypodiopsida
          - Osmundales
          - - Hymenophyllales (filmy ferns)
            - - Gleicheniales
              - - Schizaeales
                - - Salviniales (heterosporous)
                  - - Cyatheales (tree ferns)
                    - Polypodiales

=== Evolution and biogeography ===
The fern crown group, consisting of the leptosporangiates and eusporangiates, is estimated to have originated 423.2 million years ago (mya), during the late Silurian period and the rapid radiation of land plants. Fern-like taxa (Wattieza) first appear in the fossil record in the middle Devonian period, ca. 390 Mya. By the Triassic, the first evidence of ferns related to several modern families appeared. The great fern radiation occurred in the late Cretaceous (143.1 to 66 mya), when many modern families of ferns first appeared, contemporaneous with the heightened diversification of flowering plants. Successful ferns were able to adapt to the low-light conditions created by the canopy of these angiosperms.

Remarkably, the photoreceptor neochrome in the two orders Cyatheales and Polypodiales, integral to their adaptation to low-light conditions, was obtained via horizontal gene transfer from hornworts, a bryophyte lineage.

Due to the very large genome seen in most ferns, it was suspected they might have gone through whole genome duplications, but DNA sequencing has shown that their genome size is caused by the accumulation of mobile DNA like transposons and other genetic elements that infect genomes and get copied over and over again.

Ferns appear to have evolved extrafloral nectaries 135 million years ago, nearly simultaneously with the trait's evolution in angiosperms. However, nectary-associated diversifications in ferns did not hit their stride until nearly 100 million years later, in the Cenozoic. There is weak support for the rise of fern-feeding arthropods driving this diversification.

== Distribution and habitat ==
Ferns are widespread in their distribution, with the greatest richness in the tropics and least in arctic areas. The greatest diversity occurs in tropical rainforests. New Zealand, for which the fern is a symbol, has about 230 species, distributed throughout the country. It is a common plant in European forests.

Fern species live in a wide variety of habitats, from remote mountain elevations, to dry desert rock faces, bodies of water or open fields. Ferns in general may be thought of as largely being specialists in marginal habitats, often succeeding in places where various environmental factors limit the success of flowering plants. There are four particular types of habitats that ferns are found in: moist, shady forests; crevices in rock faces, especially when sheltered from the full sun; acid wetlands including bogs and swamps; and tropical trees, where many species are epiphytes (something like a quarter to a third of all fern species).

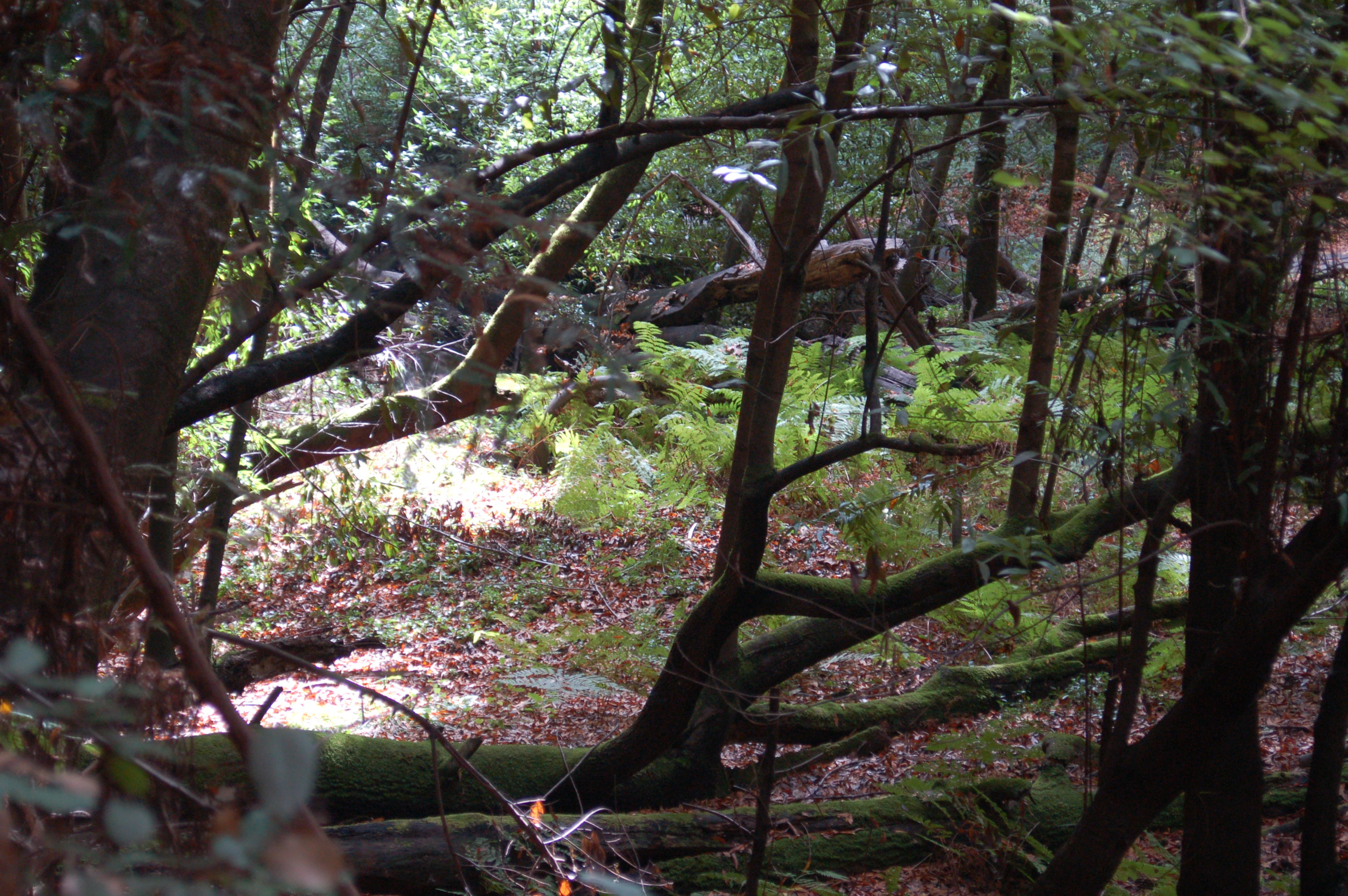
In undergrowth below coast redwoods, California

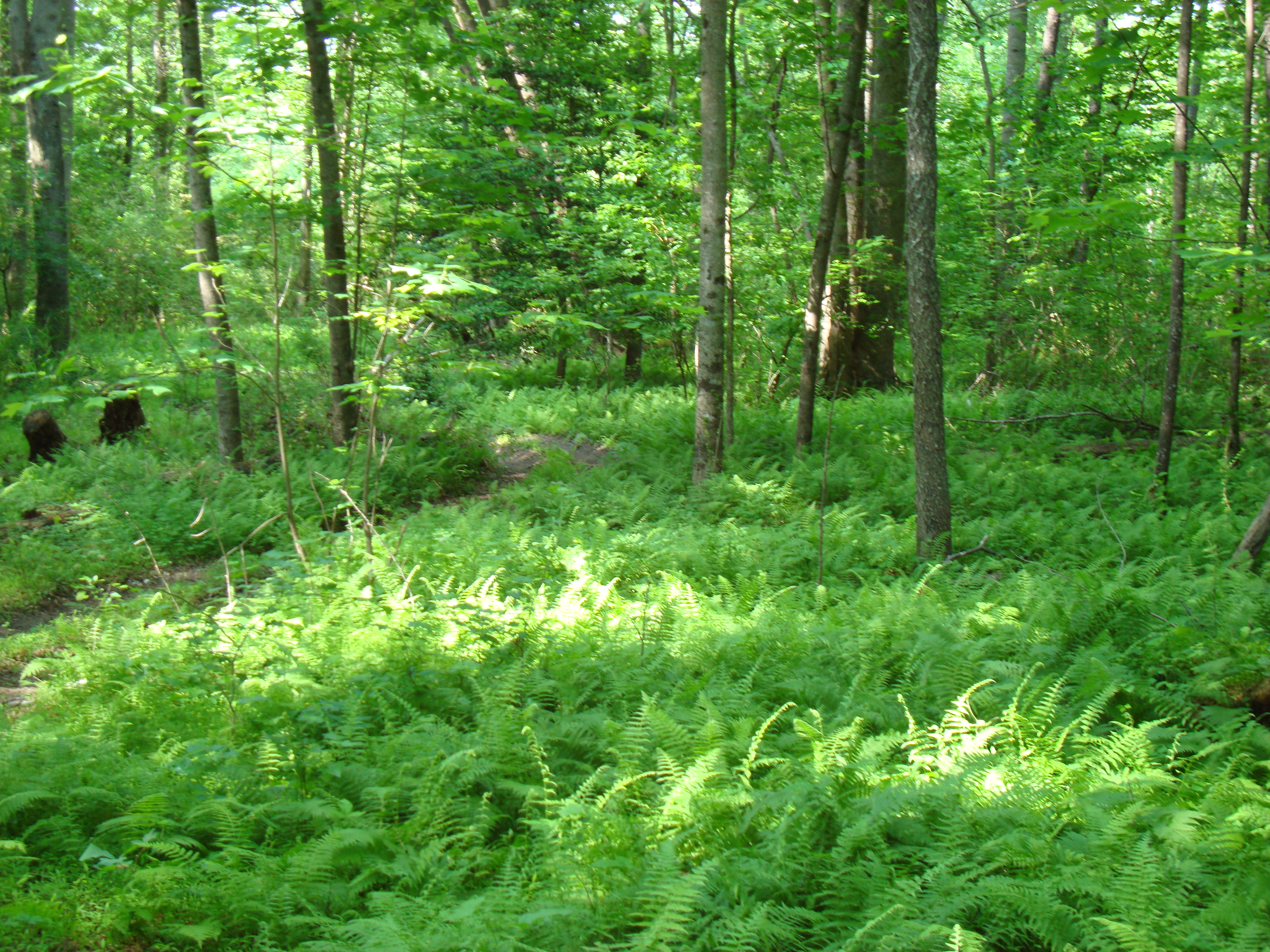
Fern bed under a forest canopy, Virginia

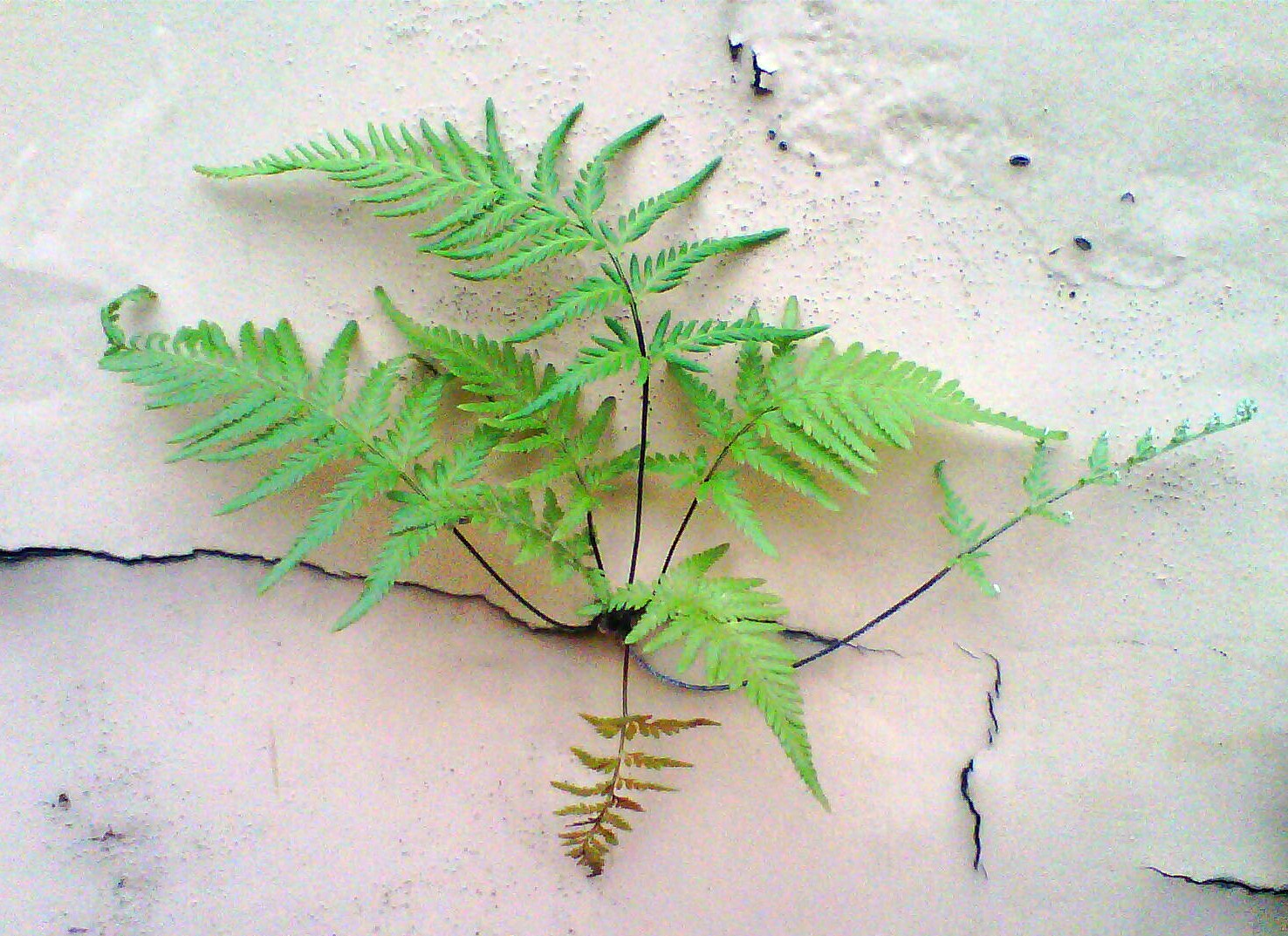
On a wall

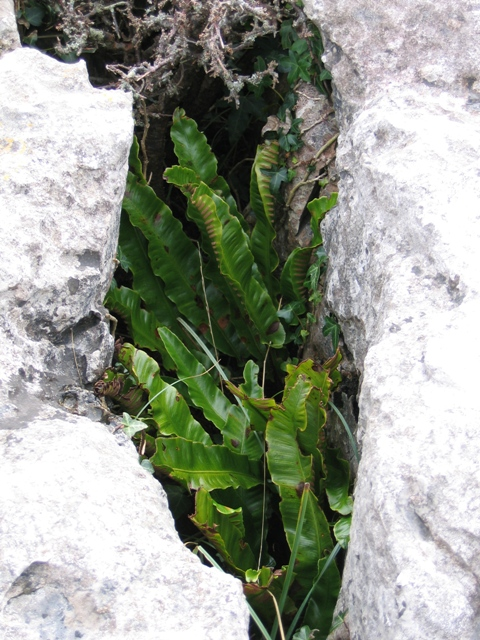
Hart's tongue fern (Asplenium scolopendrium) in a gryke in limestone pavement

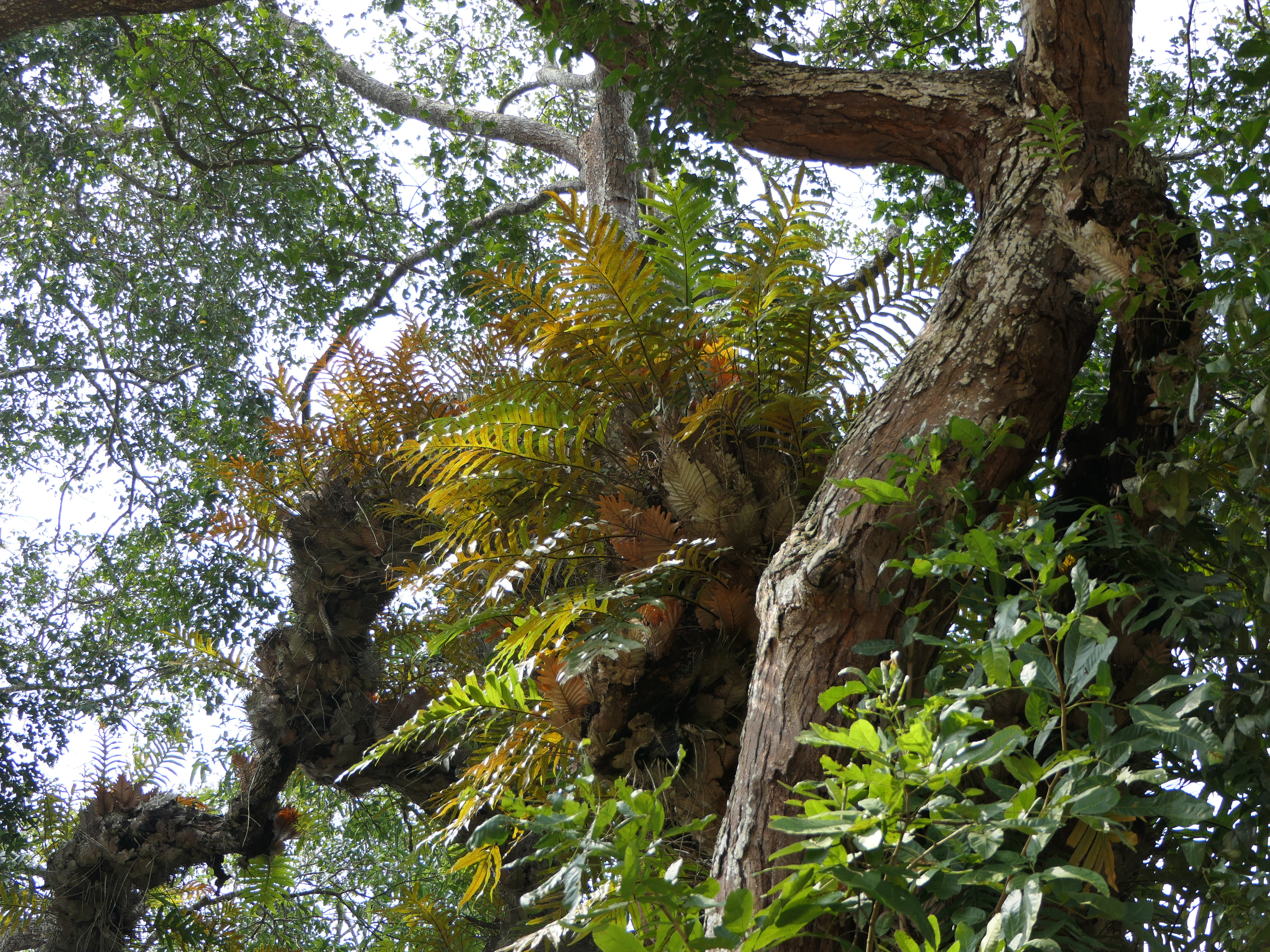
Epiphytic ferns in India

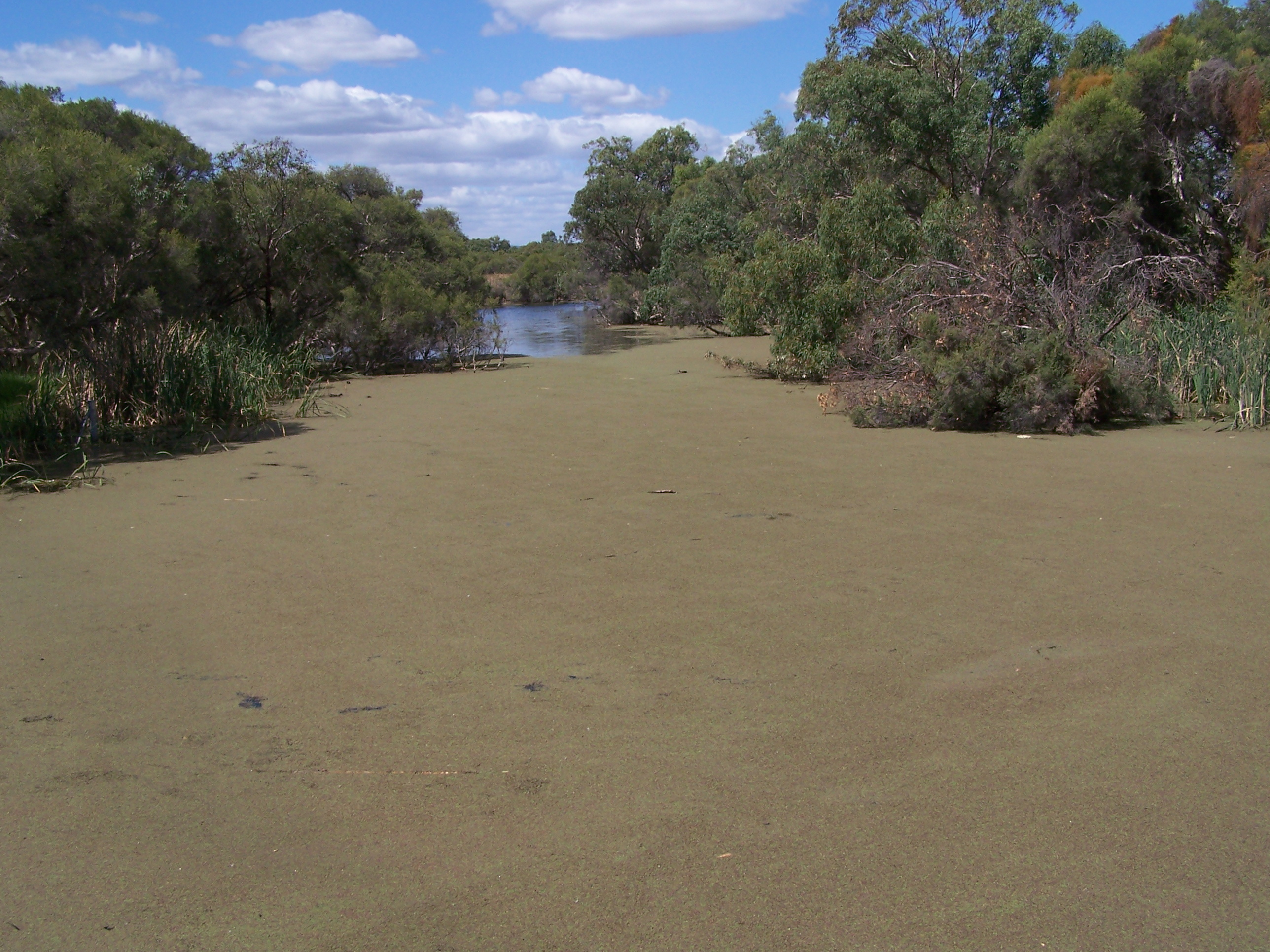
Azolla duckweed fern covering
the Canning River, Western Australia

== Ecology ==
Epiphytic ferns in particular have turned out to be hosts of a huge diversity of invertebrates. It is assumed that bird's-nest ferns alone contain up to half the invertebrate biomass within a hectare of rainforest canopy.

Many ferns depend on associations with mycorrhizal fungi. Many ferns grow only within specific pH ranges; for instance, the climbing fern (Lygodium palmatum) of eastern North America will grow only in moist, intensely acidic soils, while the bulblet bladder fern (Cystopteris bulbifera), with an overlapping range, is usually found on limestone.

The spores are rich in lipids, protein and calories, so some vertebrates eat these. The European woodmouse (Apodemus sylvaticus) has been found to eat the spores of Culcita macrocarpa, and the bullfinch (Pyrrhula murina) and the New Zealand lesser short-tailed bat (Mystacina tuberculata) also eat fern spores.

Some ferns are resistant to plant-eating insects. The gene that express the protein Tma12 in an edible fern, Tectaria macrodonta, has been transferred to cotton plants, which became resistant to whitefly infestations.

=== Invasiveness ===
Some ferns are among the world's most serious weed species, including the bracken fern growing in the Scottish highlands, or the mosquito fern (Azolla) growing in tropical lakes, both species forming large aggressively spreading colonies. Several ferns, such as bracken and Azolla species are noxious weeds or invasive species. Further examples include Japanese climbing fern (Lygodium japonicum), sensitive fern (Onoclea sensibilis) and giant water fern (Salvinia molesta), one of the world's worst aquatic weeds.

== Toxicity ==
Brackens contain carcinogens linked to esophageal and stomach cancer and should not be eaten by humans or animals. However, some guides claim that ferns are not known to be poisonous to humans.

== Uses ==
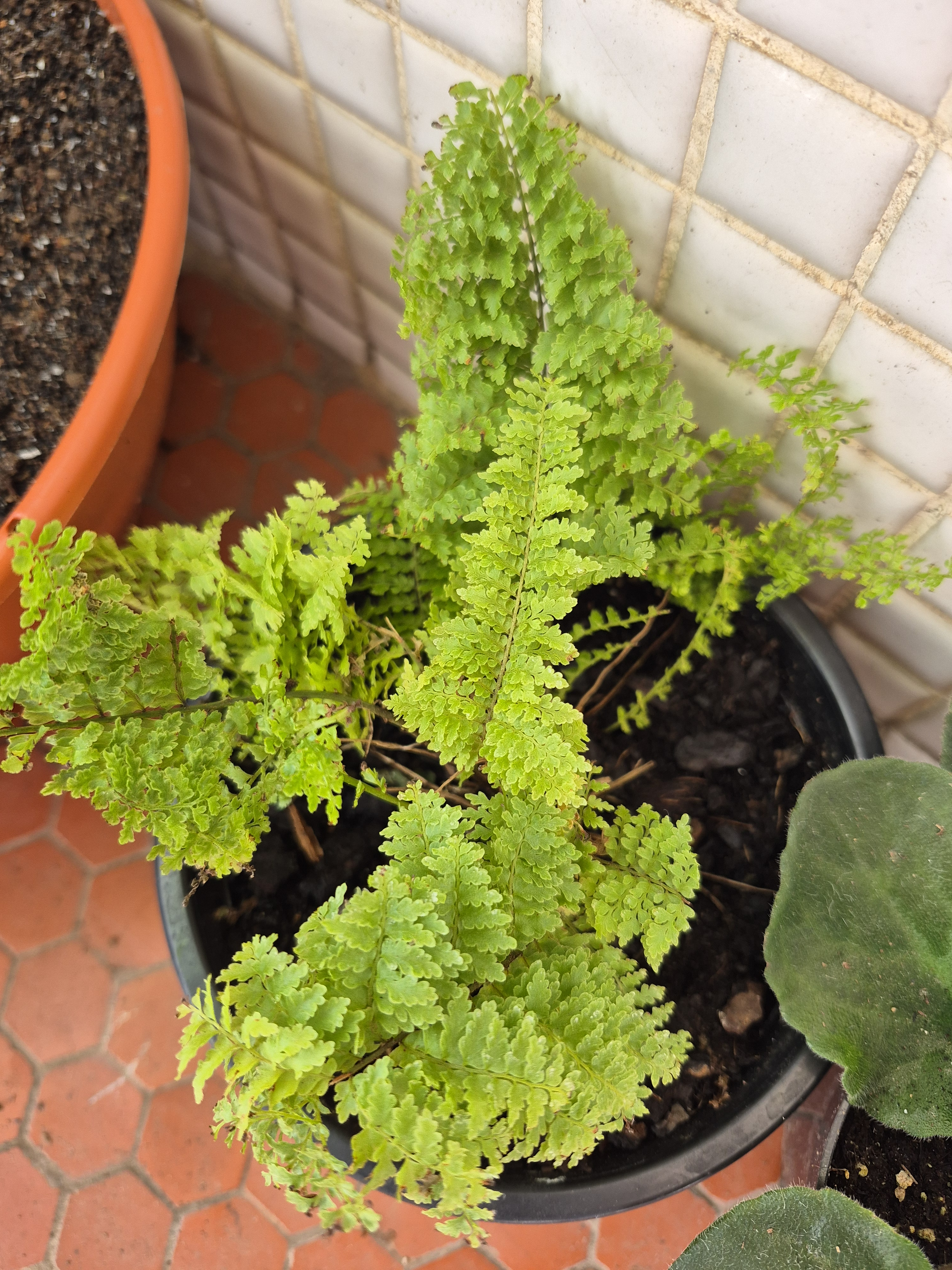
Homegrown fern in Brazil

Ferns are not as important economically as seed plants, but have considerable importance in some societies. Some are used for food, including the fiddleheads of Pteridium aquilinum (bracken), Matteuccia struthiopteris (ostrich fern), and Osmundastrum cinnamomeum (cinnamon fern). Diplazium esculentum is also eaten in budu pakis, a traditional dish of Brunei. Tubers from the "para", Ptisana salicina (king fern) are a traditional food in New Zealand and the South Pacific. Fern tubers were used for food 30,000 years ago in Europe. Fern tubers were used by the Guanches to make gofio in the Canary Islands. Licorice fern rhizomes were chewed by the natives of the Pacific Northwest for their flavor.

Ferns of the genus Azolla, commonly known as water fern or mosquito ferns, are very small, floating plants that do not resemble ferns. They are used as a biological fertilizer in the rice paddies of southeast Asia, taking advantage of their ability to fix nitrogen from the air into compounds that can then be used by other plants.

Many ferns are grown in horticulture as landscape plants, for cut foliage and as houseplants, especially the Boston fern (Nephrolepis exaltata) and other members of the genus Nephrolepis. The bird's nest fern (Asplenium nidus) is also popular, as are the staghorn ferns (genus Platycerium). Perennial (also known as hardy) ferns planted in gardens in the Northern Hemisphere also have a considerable following.

The important fossil fuel coal consists of the remains of primitive plants, including ferns.

== In culture ==
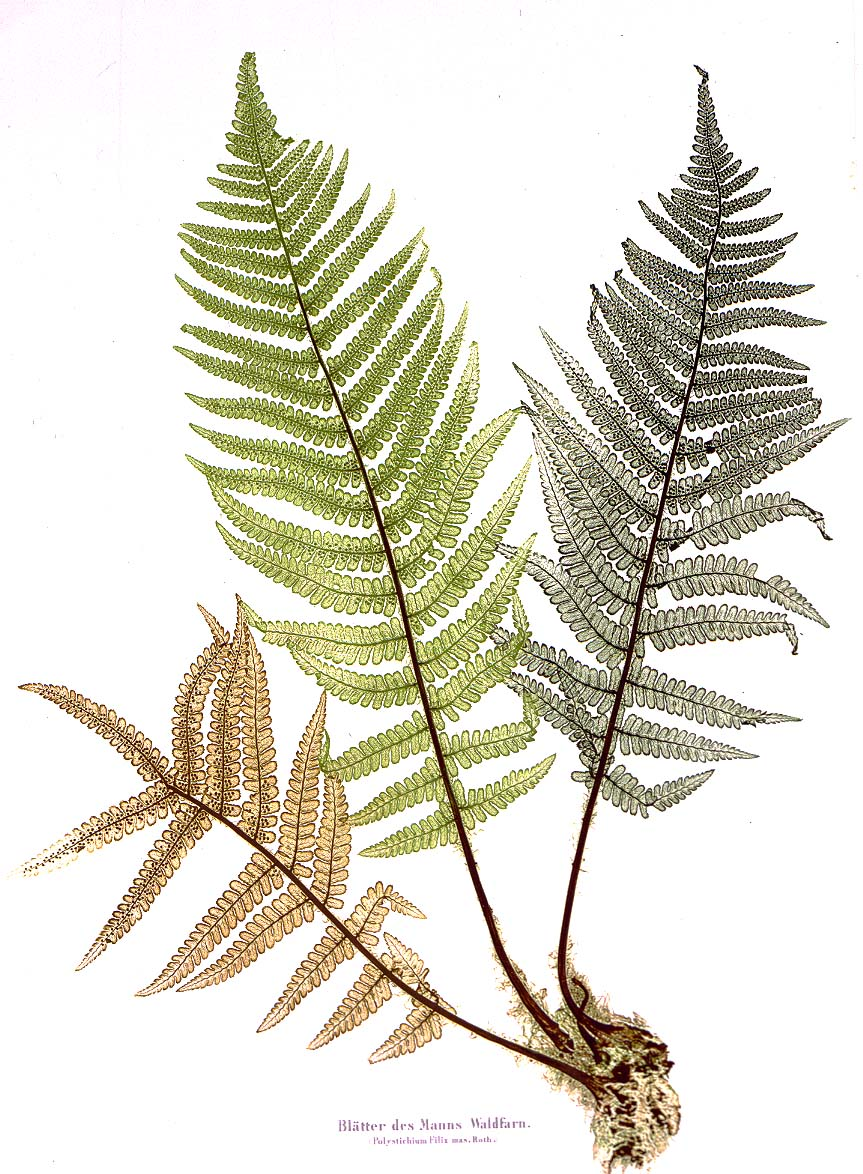
Ferns in the Victorian era: Blätter des Manns Walfarn by Alois Auer, Vienna: Imperial Printing Office, 1853

=== Pteridology ===
The study of ferns and other pteridophytes is called pteridology. A pteridologist is a specialist in the study of pteridophytes in a broader sense that includes the more distantly related lycophytes.

=== Pteridomania ===
Pteridomania was a Victorian era craze involving fern collecting and motifs in decorative art, including pottery, glass, metals, textiles, wood, printed paper, and sculpture. The fashion for growing ferns indoors led to the development of the Wardian case, a glazed cabinet that would exclude air pollutants and maintain the necessary humidity.

=== Other applications ===
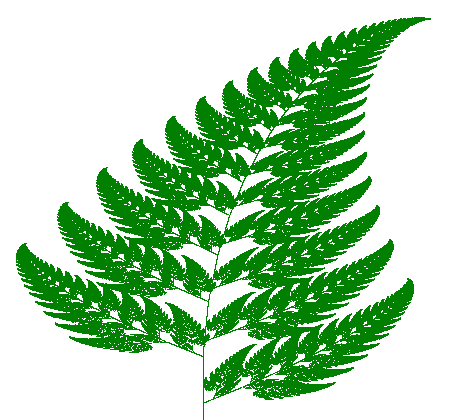
Barnsley fern created using a chaos game, through an Iterated function system

The Barnsley fern is a fractal named after the British mathematician Michael Barnsley, who first described it in his book Fractals Everywhere. A self-similar structure is described by a mathematical function, applied repeatedly at different scales to create a frond pattern.

The dried form of ferns was used in other arts, such as a stencil or directly inked for use in a design. The botanical work, The Ferns of Great Britain and Ireland, is a notable example of this type of nature printing. The process, patented by the artist and publisher Henry Bradbury, impressed a specimen on to a soft lead plate. The first publication to demonstrate this was Alois Auer's The Discovery of the Nature Printing-Process.

Fern bars were popular in America in the 1970s and 1980s.

=== Folklore ===
Ferns figure in folklore, for example in legends about mythical flowers or seeds. In Slavic folklore, ferns are believed to bloom once a year, during the Ivan Kupala night. Although alleged to be exceedingly difficult to find, anyone who sees a fern flower is thought to be guaranteed to be happy and rich for the rest of their life. Similarly, Finnish tradition holds that one who finds the seed of a fern in bloom on Midsummer night will, by possession of it, be guided and be able to travel invisibly to the locations where eternally blazing Will o' the wisps called aarnivalkea mark the spot of hidden treasure. These spots are protected by a spell that prevents anyone but the fern-seed holder from ever knowing their locations. In Wicca, ferns are thought to have magical properties such as a dried fern can be thrown into hot coals of a fire to exorcise evil spirits, or smoke from a burning fern is thought to drive away snakes and such creatures.

=== New Zealand ===
The Silver fern is the national emblem of New Zealand and feature on its passport and in the design of its national airline, Air New Zealand, and of its rugby team, the All Blacks.

== Gallery ==
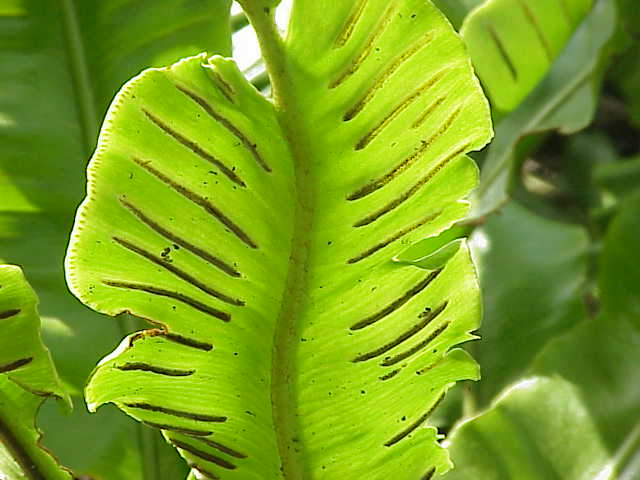

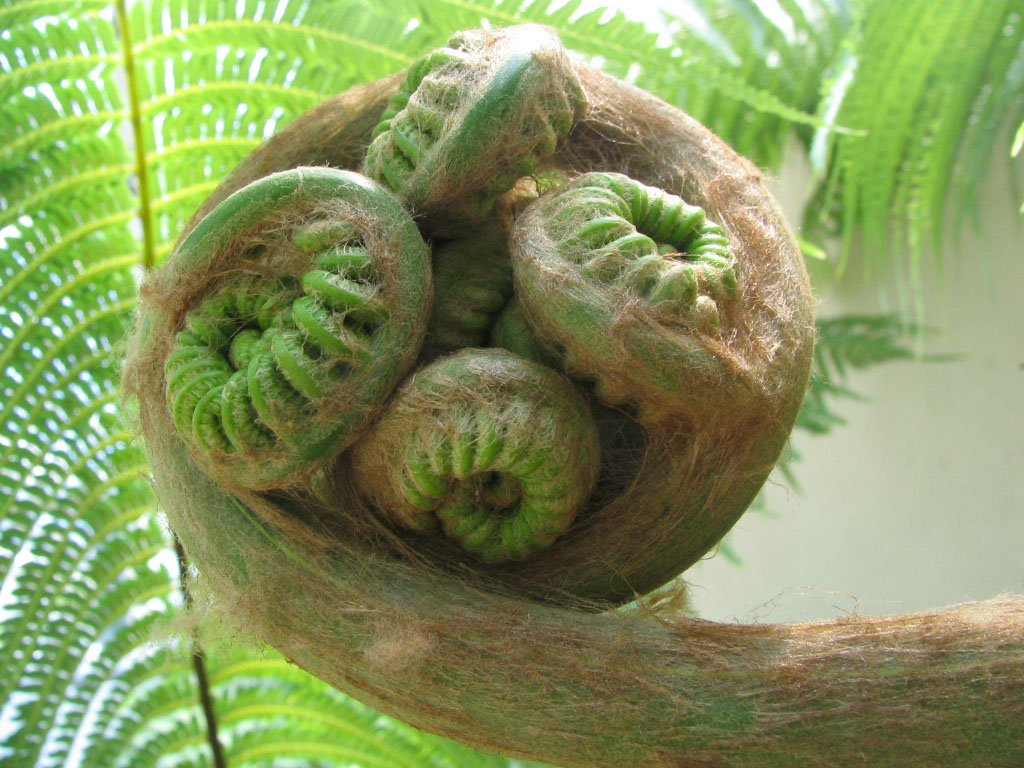

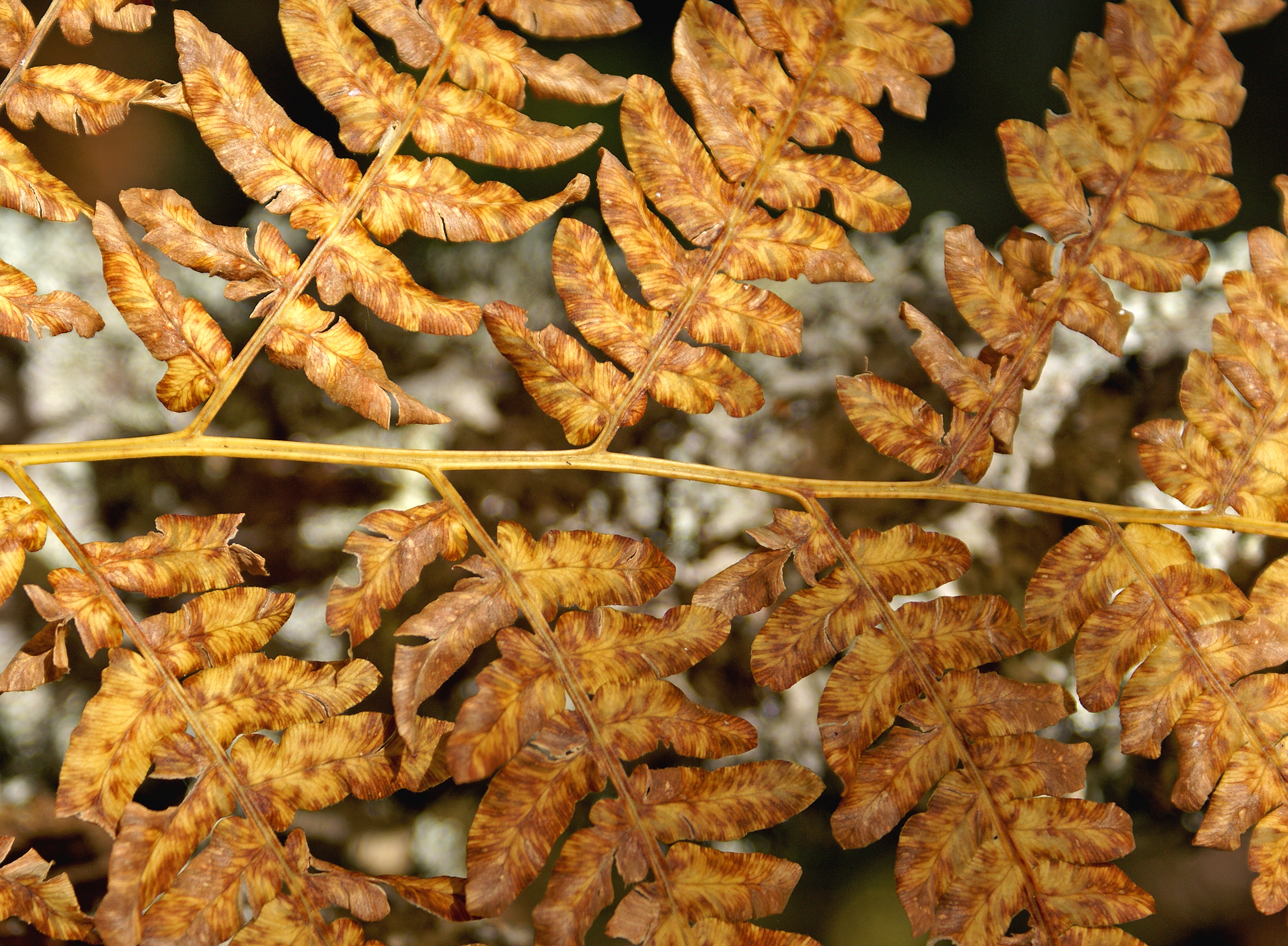

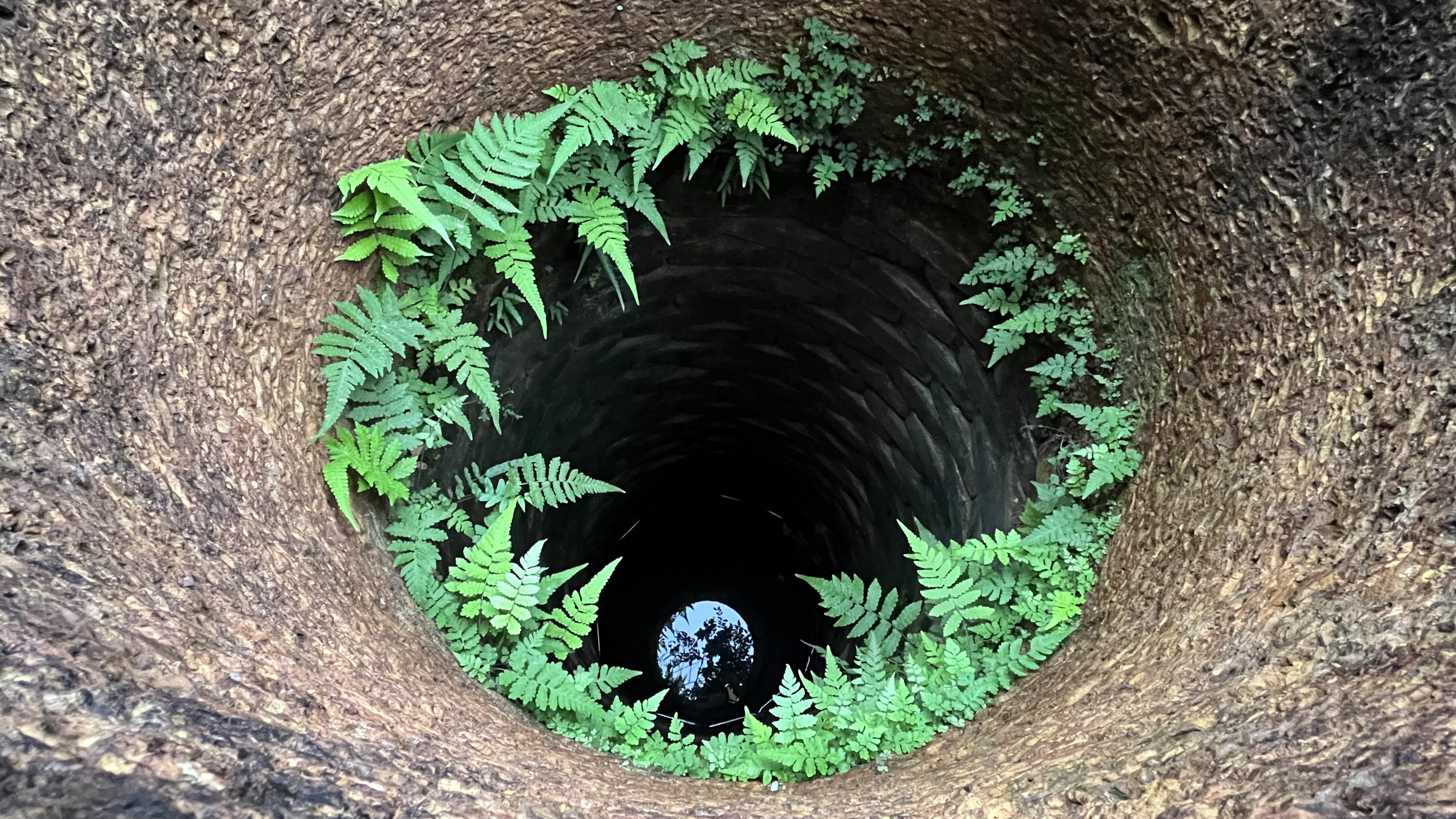

== See also ==
- British Pteridological Society
- Chirosia betuleti – Fern gall
- Fern spike
- Fern sports
- Paisley (design)
- Pteridophyte
- Silver fern flag

== Bibliography ==
=== Books ===
- Christenhusz, Maarten M. J.; Fay, Michael; Byng, James W. (2018). The Global Flora: Special Edition: GLOVAP Nomenclature Part 1. Plant Gateway Limited. ISBN 978-0-9929993-6-0.
- Linnaeus, Carl (1753). "Cryptogamia: Filices Musci". Species Plantarum: exhibentes plantas rite cognitas, ad genera relatas, cum differentiis specificis, nominibus trivialibus, synonymis selectis, locis natalibus, secundum systema sexuale digestas. Vol. 1. Stockholm, Sweden: Impensis Laurentii Salvii. pp. 1061–1100, 1100–1130. doi:10.5962/bhl.title.669., see also Species Plantarum
- Lord, Thomas R. (2006). Ferns and Fern Allies of Pennsylvania. Indiana, Pennsylvania: Pinelands Press. Ferns and Fern Allies of Pennsylvania – Thomas Reeves Lord.
- Moran, Robbin C. (2004). A Natural History of Ferns. Portland, Oregon: Timber Press. ISBN 0-88192-667-1
- Ranker, Tom A.; Haufler, Christopher H. (2008). Biology and Evolution of Ferns and Lycophytes. Cambridge University Press. ISBN 978-0-521-87411-3.
- Swartz, Olof (1806). Synopsis filicum: earum genera et species systematice complectens: adjectis lycopodineis, et descriptionibus novarum et rariorum specierum: cum tabulis aeneis quinque. Kiliae: Impensis Bibliopolii novi academici. doi:10.5962/bhl.title.81948.

=== Journal articles ===
- Berry, Chris (2009). "The Middle Devonian plant collections of Francois Stockmans reconsidered". Geologica Belgica. 12 (1–2): 25–30.
- Bomfleur, B.; McLoughlin, S.; Vajda, V. (20 March 2014). "Fossilized Nuclei and Chromosomes Reveal 180 Million Years of Genomic Stasis in Royal Ferns". Science. 343 (6177): 1376–1377. Bibcode:2014Sci...343.1376B. doi:10.1126/science.1249884. PMID 24653037. S2CID 38248823.
- Cantino, Philip D.; Doyle, James A.; Graham, Sean W.; Judd, Walter S.; Olmstead, Richard G.; Soltis, Douglas E.; Soltis, Pamela S.; Donoghue, Michael J. (1 August 2007). "Towards a Phylogenetic Nomenclature of Tracheophyta". Taxon. 56 (3): 822. doi:10.2307/25065865. JSTOR 25065865.
- Chase, Mark W. & Reveal, James L. (2009). "A phylogenetic classification of the land plants to accompany APG III". Botanical Journal of the Linnean Society. 161 (2): 122–127. doi:10.1111/j.1095-8339.2009.01002.x.
- Christenhusz, Maarten J. M. & Byng, J. W. (2016). "The number of known plants species in the world and its annual increase". Phytotaxa. 261 (3). Magnolia Press: 201–217. Bibcode:2016Phytx.261..201C. doi:10.11646/phytotaxa.261.3.1.
- Christenhusz, Maarten J. M.; Zhang, X. C.; Schneider, H. (18 February 2011). "A linear sequence of extant families and genera of lycophytes and ferns". Phytotaxa. 19 (1): 7. Bibcode:2011Phytx..19....7C. doi:10.11646/phytotaxa.19.1.2. hdl:10138/28042.
- Christenhusz, Maarten J. M.; Chase, Mark W. (2014). "Trends and concepts in fern classification". Annals of Botany. 113 (4): 571–594. doi:10.1093/aob/mct299. PMC 3936591. PMID 24532607.
- Christenhusz, Maarten J. M.; Chase, Mark W. (1 June 2018). "PPG recognises too many fern genera". Taxon. 67 (3): 481–487. Bibcode:2018Taxon..67..481C. doi:10.12705/673.2.
- May, Lenore Wile (1978). "The economic uses and associated folklore of ferns and fern allies". The Botanical Review. 44 (4): 491–528. Bibcode:1978BotRv..44..491M. doi:10.1007/BF02860848. S2CID 42101599.
- Melan, M. A.; Whittier, D. P. (1990). "Effects of Inorganic Nitrogen Sources on Spore Germination and Gametophyte Growth in Botrychium Dissectum". Plant, Cell and Environment. 13 (5): 477–482. Bibcode:1990PCEnv..13..477M. doi:10.1111/j.1365-3040.1990.tb01325.x.
- Pryer, Kathleen M.; Schneider, Harald; Smith, Alan R.; Cranfill, Raymond; Wolf, Paul G.; Hunt, Jeffrey S.; Sipes, Sedonia D. (2001). "Horsetails and ferns are a monophyletic group and the closest living relatives to seed plants". Nature. 409 (6820): 618–622. Bibcode:2001Natur.409..618S. doi:10.1038/35054555. PMID 11214320. S2CID 4367248.
- Pryer, Kathleen M.; Schuettpelz, Eric; Wolf, Paul G.; Schneider, Harald; Smith, Alan R.; Cranfill, Raymond (2004). "Phylogeny and evolution of ferns (monilophytes) with a focus on the early leptosporangiate divergences". American Journal of Botany. 91 (10): 1582–1598. Bibcode:2004AmJB...91.1582P. doi:10.3732/ajb.91.10.1582. PMID 21652310.
- Pteridophyte Phylogeny Group (November 2016). "A community-derived classification for extant lycophytes and ferns". Journal of Systematics and Evolution. 54 (6): 563–603. Bibcode:2016JSyEv..54..563.. doi:10.1111/jse.12229. S2CID 39980610.
- Schneider, Harald; Smith, Alan R.; Pryer, Kathleen M. (1 July 2009). "Is Morphology Really at Odds with Molecules in Estimating Fern Phylogeny?". Systematic Botany. 34 (3): 455–475. Bibcode:2009SysBo..34..455S. doi:10.1600/036364409789271209. S2CID 85855934.
- Schuettpelz, Eric (2007). "Table 1". The evolution and diversification of epiphytic ferns (PDF) (PhD thesis). Duke University. Archived from the original (PDF) on 20 June 2010.
- Schuettpelz, Eric; Rouhan, Germinal; Pryer, Kathleen M.; Rothfels, Carl J.; Prado, Jefferson; Sundue, Michael A.; Windham, Michael D.; Moran, Robbin C.; Smith, Alan R. (1 June 2018). "Are there too many fern genera?". Taxon. 67 (3): 473–480. Bibcode:2018Taxon..67..473S. doi:10.12705/673.1.
- Smith, Alan R.; Kathleen M. Pryer; Eric Schuettpelz; Petra Korall; Harald Schneider; Paul G. Wolf (2006). "A classification for extant ferns" (PDF). Taxon. 55 (3): 705–731. Bibcode:2006Taxon..55..705S. doi:10.2307/25065646. JSTOR 25065646.
- Stein, W. E.; Mannolini, F.; Hernick, L. V.; Landling, E.; Berry, C. M. (2007). "Giant cladoxylopsid trees resolve the enigma of the Earth's earliest forest stumps at Gilboa". Nature. 446 (7138): 904–907. Bibcode:2007Natur.446..904S. doi:10.1038/nature05705. PMID 17443185. S2CID 2575688.
- Walkowiak, Radoslaw Janusz (2017). "Classification of Pteridophytes – Short classification of the ferns" (PDF). IEA Paper. doi:10.13140/RG.2.2.29934.20809.
- Underwood, L. M. (1903). "The early writers on ferns and their collections. I. Linnaeus, 1707–1778". Torreya. 3 (10): 145–150. ISSN 0096-3844. JSTOR 40594126.

=== Websites ===
- McCausland, Jim (22 February 2019). "Rediscover ferns". Garden plants. Sunset Magazine. Archived from the original on 30 October 2021.
- "Pteridopsida: Fossil Record". Plants: Pteridopsida. University of California Museum of Paleontology.
- "Classifying and identifying ferns". Science Learning Hub. The University of Waikato. 3 September 2018.
- Mickel, John T.; Wagner, Warren H.; Gifford, Ernest M.; et al. (4 February 2019). "Fern". Encyclopædia Britannica.
- Hassler, Michael; Schmitt, Bernd (2 November 2019). "Checklist of Ferns and Lycophytes of the World". World Ferns. Botanical Garden of the Karlsruhe Institute of Technology. Archived from the original on 2 September 2017.
- Pryer, Kathleen M.; Smith, Alan R.; Rothfels, Carl (2009). "Polypodiopsida". Tree of Life.
- A classification of the ferns and their allies. (Australian National Herbarium)
- A fern book bibliography.
- Register of fossil Pteridophyta
- Watson, L. and M. J. Dallwitz (2004 onwards). The Ferns (Filicopsida) of the British Isles. Archived 3 March 2016 at the Wayback Machine
- Ferns and Pteridomania in Victorian Scotland.
- Non-seed plant images at bioimages.vanderbilt.edu
- American Fern Society
- British Pteridological Society Archived 2 January 2019 at the Wayback Machine
- International Equisetological Association
