= Collage theorem =

Characterises an iterated function system whose attractor is close to a given set

In mathematics, the collage theorem characterises an iterated function system whose attractor is close, relative to the Hausdorff metric, to a given set. The IFS described is composed of contractions whose images, as a collage or union when mapping the given set, are arbitrarily close to the given set. It is typically used in fractal compression.

== Statement ==
Let $\mathbb{X}$ be a complete metric space. Suppose $L$ is a nonempty, compact subset of $\mathbb{X}$ and let $\varepsilon >0$ be given. Choose an iterated function system (IFS) $\{ \mathbb{X} ; w_1, w_2, \dots, w_N\}$ with contractivity factor $s$, where $0 \leq s < 1$ (the contractivity factor $s$ of the IFS is the maximum of the contractivity factors of the maps $w_i$). Suppose

$$h\left( L, \bigcup_{n=1}^N w_n (L) \right) \leq \varepsilon,$$

where $h(\cdot,\cdot)$ is the Hausdorff metric. Then

$$h(L,A) \leq \frac{\varepsilon}{1-s}$$

where $A$ is the attractor of the IFS. Equivalently,

$$h(L,A) \leq (1-s)^{-1} h\left(L,\bigcup_{n=1}^N w_n(L)\right)$$

for all nonempty, compact subsets $L$ of $\mathbb{X}$.

Informally, if $L$ is close to being stabilized by the IFS, then $L$ is also close to being the attractor of the IFS.

== See also ==
- Michael Barnsley
- Barnsley fern
