= Michael Barnsley =

British mathematician (born 1946)

Michael Fielding Barnsley (born 1946) is a British mathematician, researcher and an entrepreneur who has worked on fractal compression; he holds several patents on the technology. He received his Ph.D. in theoretical chemistry from University of Wisconsin–Madison in 1972 and BA in mathematics from Oxford in 1968. In 1987 he founded Iterated Systems Incorporated, and in 1988 he published a book entitled Fractals Everywhere and in 2006 SuperFractals.

He has also published these scientific papers: "Existence and Uniqueness of Orbital Measures", "Theory and Applications of Fractal Tops", "A Fractal Valued Random Iteration Algorithm and Fractal Hierarchy", "V-variable fractals and superfractals", "Fractal Transformations" and "Ergodic Theory, Fractal Tops and Colour Stealing".

He is also credited for discovering the collage theorem.

Iterated Systems was initially devoted to fractal image compression (epitomised by the Barnsley fern), and later focused on image archive management and was renamed to MediaBin. It was acquired in 2003 by Interwoven, by which time Barnsley was no longer affiliated with the company.

As of 2005, he is on the faculty of the Mathematical Sciences Institute of the Australian National University. Barnsley previously held a faculty position at Georgia Tech.

Michael Barnsley is the son of author Gabriel Fielding (Alan Fielding Barnsley) and a descendant of Henry Fielding.
