= 1995–96 Hull City A.F.C. season =

English football club season

Hull City
1995–96 season
- Chairman: Martin Fish
- Manager: Terry Dolan
- Stadium: Boothferry Park
- Second Division: 24th (relegated)
- FA Cup: First round
- League Cup: Second round
- League Trophy: Second round
- Top goalscorer: League: Richard Peacock (7); All: Dean Windass (8)
Home colours	Away colours	Third colours

The 1995–96 season was the 92nd season in the history of Hull City Association Football Club and their fourth consecutive season in the Second Division, yet their fifth consecutive season in the third tier. In addition to the domestic league, the club would also participate in the FA Cup, the League Cup, and the League Trophy.

== Competitions ==
=== Second Division ===
==== League table ====
Pos	Team	Pld	W	D	L	GF	GA	GD	Pts	Promotion or relegation
20	York City	46	13	13	20	58	73	−15	52	
21	Carlisle United (R)	46	12	13	21	57	72	−15	49	Relegation to the Third Division
22	Swansea City (R)	46	11	14	21	43	79	−36	47	Relegation to the Third Division
23	Brighton & Hove Albion (R)	46	10	10	26	46	69	−23	40	Relegation to the Third Division
24	Hull City (R)	46	5	16	25	36	78	−42	31	Relegation to the Third Division

(R) Relegated

==== Results summary ====
Overall								Home						Away					
Pld	W	D	L	GF	GA	GD	Pts	W	D	L	GF	GA	GD	W	D	L	GF	GA	GD
46	5	16	25	36	78	−42	31	4	8	11	26	37	−11	1	8	14	10	41	−31

Source: Soccerbase

==== Matches ====
Win Draw Loss

#	Date	Home	Result	Away	Venue	Att.	Scorers (Note: Hull scorers only)
1	12.08.95	Hull City	0–1	Swindon Town	H	6,525	
2	19.08.95	Rotherham United	1–1	Hull City	A	3,754	Windass
3	26.08.95	Hull City	2–1	Blackpool	H	4,755	Mason, Brown
4	29.08.95	Brentford	1–0	Hull City	A	4,535	
5	02.09.95	Chesterfield	0–0	Hull City	A	4,345	
6	09.09.95	Hull City	0–0	Oxford United	H	4,608	
7	12.09.95	Hull City	0–0	Swansea City	H	3,519	
8	16.09.95	Burnley	2–1	Hull City	A	10,613	Fewings
9	23.09.95	Carlisle United	2–0	Hull City	A	5,986	
10	30.09.95	Hull City	0–3	York City	H	5,273	
11	07.10.95	Hull City	2–3	Shrewsbury Town	H	3,266	Abbott, Windass (pen.)
12	14.10.95	Bristol City	4–0	Hull City	A	5,354	
13	21.10.95	Hull City	1–1	Stockport County	H	3,496	Abbott
14	28.10.95	Wycombe Wanderers	2–2	Hull City	A	5,021	Lee, Windass
15	31.10.95	Crewe Alexandra	1–0	Hull City	A	3,609	
16	04.11.95	Hull City	1–1	Wrexham	H	3,515	Abbott
17	18.11.95	Bradford City	1–1	Hull City	A	5,820	Windass
18	25.11.95	Hull City	2–3	Peterborough United	H	3,642	Peacock, Davison
19	09.12.95	Hull City	2–5	Carlisle United	H	3,478	Peacock (2)
20	16.12.95	York City	0–1	Hull City	A	3,593	Fewings
21	23.12.95	Bournemouth	2–0	Hull City	A	3,491	
22	06.01.96	Bristol Rovers	2–1	Hull City	A	4,276	Davison (pen.)
23	13.01.96	Hull City	1–4	Rotherham United	H	3,678	Abbott
24	20.01.96	Swindon Town	3–0	Hull City	A	8,287	
25	23.01.96	Hull City	0–0	Brighton & Hove Albion	H	2,421	
26	03.02.96	Blackpool	1–1	Hull City	A	4,713	Allison
27	10.02.96	Hull City	1–3	Bristol Rovers	H	3,311	Davison
28	17.02.96	Swansea City	0–0	Hull City	A	1,909	
29	24.02.96	Hull City	3–0	Burnley	H	4,206	Peacock (2), Davison
30	27.02.96	Oxford United	2–0	Hull City	A	4,650	
31	02.03.96	Notts County	1–0	Hull City	A	4,528	
32	05.03.96	Hull City	0–1	Brentford	H	2,284	
33	09.03.96	Hull City	1–1	Bournemouth	H	2,853	Graham
34	12.03.96	Hull City	0–0	Chesterfield	H	2,832	
35	16.03.96	Brighton & Hove Albion	4–0	Hull City	A	4,910	
36	23.03.96	Hull City	1–0	Walsall	H	3,060	Abbott
37	26.03.96	Hull City	0–0	Notts County	H	2,589	
38	30.03.96	Shrewsbury Town	1–1	Hull City	A	2,347	Peacock
39	02.04.96	Hull City	2–3	Bristol City	H	2,641	Mann, Gordon
40	06.04.96	Hull City	4–2	Wycombe Wanderers	H	3,065	Abbott, Peacock, Quigley, Wilkinson
41	08..04.96	Stockport County	0–0	Hull City	A	5,043	
42	13.04.96	Hull City	1–2	Crewe Alexandra	H	3,497	Gordon
43	20.04.96	Wrexham	5–0	Hull City	A	3,505	
44	23.04.96	Walsall	3–0	Hull City	A	2,740	
45	27.04.96	Peterborough United	3–1	Hull City	A	6,649	Allison
46	04.05.96	Hull City	2–3	Bradford City	H	8,965	Darby, Gordon

=== FA Cup ===
==== Matches ====
Win Draw Loss

#	Date	Home	Result	Away	Venue	Att.	Scorers
First	11.11.95	Hull City	0–0	Wrexham	H	3,724	
Replay	21.11.95	Wrexham	(3) 0–0 (1) (pens)	Hull City	A	4,522	

=== League Cup ===
==== Matches ====
Win Draw Loss

#	Date	Home	Result	Away	Venue	Att.	Scorers
First	15.08.95	Hull City	1–2	Carlisle United	H	2,779	Windass
First	22.08.95	Carlisle United	2–4	Hull City	A	4,250	Allison, Windass (2), Fewings
Second	20.09.95	Coventry City	2–0	Hull City	A	8,915	
Second	04.10.95	Hull City	0–1	Coventry City	H	6,929	

=== League Trophy ===
==== Matches ====
Win Draw Loss

#	Date	Home	Result	Away	Venue	Att.	Scorers
First	26.09.95	Scarborough	0–2	Hull City	A	893	Lawford, Mann
First	17.10.95	Hull City	1–0	Preston North End	H	753	Fewings
Second	28.11.95	Hull City	1–2	Blackpool	H	1,422	Windass

== Squad ==
Name	Position	Nationality	Place of birth	Date of birth (age) (Note: Players' ages listed as they were on 1 July 1995, the official start date of the 1995–96 season)	Previous club	Date signed	Fee
Goalkeepers
Roy Carroll	GK	NIR	Enniskillen	30 September 1977 (age 17)	(Northern Ireland) Ballinamallard United	September 1995	Unknown
Alan Fettis	GK	NIR	Newtownards	1 February 1971 (age 24)	(Northern Ireland) Ards	July 1991	£50,000
Steve Wilson	GK	ENG	Hull	24 April 1974 (age 21)	Academy	4 May 1991	–
Defenders
Neil Allison	DF	ENG	Hull	20 October 1973 (age 21)	Academy	May 1991	–
Simon Dakin	DF	ENG	Nottingham	30 November 1974 (age 20)	Derby County	March 1994	Unknown
Rob Dewhurst	DF	ENG	Keighley	10 September 1971 (age 23)	Blackburn Rovers	5 November 1993	Free
Richard Fidler	DF	ENG	Sheffield	26 October 1976 (age 18)	Leeds United	December 1995	Free
Jimmy Graham	DF	SCO	Glasgow	5 November 1969 (age 25)	Rochdale	August 1994	Unknown
Gary Hobson	DF	ENG	North Ferriby	12 November 1972 (age 22)	Academy	April 1991	–
Glenn Humphries	DF	ENG	Hull	11 August 1964 (age 30)	(Hong Kong) Voicelink/Golden	August 1995	Unknown
Adam Lowthorpe	DF	ENG	Hull	7 August 1975 (age 19)	Academy	July 1993	–
Scott Maxfield	DF	ENG	Doncaster	13 July 1976 (age 18)	Doncaster Rovers	27 March 1996	Unknown
Simon Trevitt	DF	ENG	Dewsbury	20 December 1967 (age 27)	Huddersfield Town	December 1995	£20,000
Ian Wilkinson	DF	ENG	North Ferriby	19 September 1977 (age 17)	Academy	March 1996	–
Midfielders
Greg Abbott	MF	ENG	Coventry	14 December 1963 (age 31)	Guiseley	December 1992	Unknown
Kenny Gilbert	MF	SCO	Aberdeen	8 March 1975 (age 20)	(Scotland) Aberdeen	January 1996	Loan
Craig Lawford	MF	ENG	Dewsbury	25 November 1972 (age 22)	Bradford City	June 1994	Unknown
Chris Lee	MF	ENG	Batley	18 June 1971 (age 24)	Scarborough	July 1993	Free
Neil Mann	MF	SCO	(England) Nottingham	19 November 1972 (age 22)	Grantham Town	July 1993	Free
Jamie Marks	MF	NIR	Belfast	18 March 1977 (age 18)	Leeds United	February 1996	Free
Richard Peacock	MF	ENG	Sheffield	29 October 1972 (age 22)	Sheffield F.C.	October 1993	Unknown
Lee Pridmore	MF	ENG	Rotherham	23 April 1978 (age 17)	Academy	11 November 1995	–
Mike Quigley	MF	ENG	Manchester	2 October 1970 (age 24)	Manchester City	July 1995	Unknown
Tommy Watson	MF	ENG	Liverpool	29 September 1969 (age 25)	Grimsby Town	October 1995	Loan
Paul Wharton	MF	ENG	Newcastle	26 June 1977 (age 18)	Leeds United	February 1996	Free
Andy Williams	MF	ENG	Birmingham	29 July 1962 (age 32)	Rotherham United	July 1995	Unknown
Forwards
Linton Brown	FW	ENG	Hull	12 April 1968 (age 27)	Halifax Town	January 1993	Unknown
Duane Darby	FW	ENG	Birmingham	17 October 1973 (age 21)	Doncaster Rovers	27 March 1996	£25,000
Bobby Davison	FW	ENG	South Shields	17 July 1959 (age 35)	Rotherham United	November 1995	Loan
Paul Fewings	FW	ENG	Hull	18 February 1978 (age 17)	Academy	May 1995	–
Gavin Gordon	FW	ENG	Manchester	24 June 1979 (age 16)	Academy	July 1995	–
Andy Mason	FW	ENG	Bolton	22 November 1974 (age 20)	Bolton Wanderers	July 1995	Free
Dean Windass	FW	ENG	Hull	1 April 1969 (age 26)	North Ferriby United	October 1991	Unknown
