= 1997–98 Hull City A.F.C. season =

English football team season

Hull City
1997–98 season
- Chairman: David Lloyd
- Manager: Mark Hateley
- Stadium: Boothferry Park
- Third Division: 22nd
- FA Cup: First round
- League Cup: Third round
- League Trophy: Second round
- Top goalscorer: League: Duane Darby (13); All: Duane Darby (15)
- Highest home attendance: 9,323 (v Crystal Palace, 16 September, League Cup)
- Lowest home attendance: 1,518 (v Scarborough, 9 December, League Trophy)
- Average home league attendance: 4,682
- Biggest win: 7–4 (v Swansea City, 30 August); 3–0 (v Scarborough, 11 October); 3–0 (v Doncaster Rovers, 29 November)
- Biggest defeat: 5–1 (v Torquay United, 14 February)
Home colours	Away colours

The 1997–98 season was the 94th season in the history of Hull City Association Football Club and their second consecutive season in the Third Division. In addition to the domestic league, the club would also participate in the FA Cup, the League Cup, and the League Trophy.

== Competitions ==
=== Third Division ===
==== League table ====
Pos	Team	Pld	W	D	L	GF	GA	GD	Pts	Promotion or relegation
20	Swansea City	46	13	11	22	49	62	−13	50	
21	Cardiff City	46	9	23	14	48	52	−4	50	
22	Hull City	46	11	8	27	56	83	−27	41	
23	Brighton & Hove Albion	46	6	17	23	38	66	−28	35	
24	Doncaster Rovers (R)	46	4	8	34	30	113	−83	20	Relegation to Football Conference

Rules for classification: In the Football League goals scored (GF) takes precedence over goal difference (GD).
(R) Relegated

==== Results summary ====
Overall								Home						Away					
Pld	W	D	L	GF	GA	GD	Pts	W	D	L	GF	GA	GD	W	D	L	GF	GA	GD
46	11	8	27	56	83	−27	41	10	6	7	36	32	+4	1	2	20	20	51	−31

Source: Soccerbase

==== Matches ====
Win Draw Loss

#	Date	Home	Result	Away	Venue	Referee	Att.	Scorers (Note: Hull scorers only)
1	09.08.97	Mansfield Town	2–0	Hull City	A	M. Jones	4,627	
2	16.08.97	Hull City	0–3	Notts County	H	B. Coddington	7,412	
3	23.08.97	Peterborough United	2–0	Hull City	A	A. Bates	5,701	
4	30.08.97	Hull City	7–4	Swansea City	H	D. Laws	5,198	Darby (3), Rioch, Hodges, Mann (2)
5	02.09.97	Hull City	0–0	Rotherham United	H	A. Hall	6,127	
6	05.09.97	Chester City	1–0	Hull City	A	T. Jones	2,271	
7	13.09.97	Hull City	0–2	Lincoln City	H	Unknown	4,736	
8	20.09.97	Rochdale	2–1	Hull City	A	M. Pike	2,085	Lowthorpe
9	27.09.97	Scunthorpe United	2–0	Hull City	A	G. Frankland	4,905	
10	04.10.97	Hull City	3–3	Torquay United	H	M. Dean	5,139	Peacock, Gordon, Greaves
11	11.10.97	Hull City	3–0	Scarborough	H	R. Pearson	5,315	Peacock, Rocastle, Quigley
12	18.10.97	Barnet	2–0	Hull City	A	M. Brandwood	2,315	
13	21.10.97	Cambridge United	0–1	Hull City	A	B. Knight	2,388	Greaves
14	25.10.97	Hull City	0–0	Brighton & Hove Albion	H	E. Lomas	5,686	
15	01.11.97	Darlington	4–3	Hull City	A	D. Pugh	2,893	Joyce, Rioch, Gordon
16	04.11.97	Hull City	3–2	Exeter City	H	S. Mathieson	3,837	Joyce, Ellington (2)
17	08.11.97	Hull City	1–4	Shrewsbury Town	H	G. Stretton	4,758	Rioch
18	18.10.97	Cardiff City	2–1	Hull City	A	A. Butler	2,504	Darby
19	22.11.97	Macclesfield Town	2–0	Hull City	A	P. Richards	2,508	
20	29.11.97	Hull City	3–0	Doncaster Rovers	H	C. Foy	4,721	Gore (o.g.), Rioch (pen.), Hocking
21	02.12.97	Hartlepool United	2–2	Hull City	A	T. Jones	1,933	Joyce, Hodges
22	13.12.97	Hull City	3–1	Colchester United	H	M. Jones	3,896	Dewhurst, Rioch (pen.), Darby
23	20.12.97	Leyton Orient	2–1	Hull City	A	B. Coddington	4,013	Wright
24	26.12.97	Hull City	1–2	Chester City	H	M. Messias	6,807	Dewhurst
25	28.12.97	Rotherham United	5–4	Hull City	A	S. Baines	5,995	Darby (2), Hodges (2)
26	10.01.98	Hull City	0–0	Mansfield Town	H	K. Lynch	4,440	
27	17.01.98	Swansea City	2–0	Hull City	A	A. Leake	2,899	
28	20.01.98	Notts County	1–0	Hull City	A	E. Wolstenholme	4,017	
29	24.01.98	Hull City	3–1	Peterborough United	H	A. Wiley	4,669	Joyce, Darby (2)
30	31.01.98	Lincoln City	1–0	Hull City	A	G. Frankland	4,067	
31	07.02.98	Hull City	0–2	Rochdale	H	G. Laws	4,031	
32	14.02.98	Torquay United	5–1	Hull City	A	A. D'Urso	2,793	Bettney
33	21.02.98	Hull City	2–1	Scunthorpe United	H	C. Foy	4,904	Dewhurst, McGinty
34	24.02.98	Hull City	0–2	Barnet	H	S. Mathieson	3,296	
35	28.02.98	Scarborough	2–1	Hull City	A	D. Pugh	3,831	Boyack
36	03.03.98	Shrewsbury Town	2–0	Hull City	A	M. Pike	1,523	
37	07.03.98	Hull City	1–1	Darlington	H	P. Taylor	3,616	Wright
38	14.03.98	Exeter City	3–0	Hull City	A	P. Rejer	3,052	
39	21.03.98	Hull City	0–1	Cardiff City	H	S. Baines	3,408	
40	28.03.98	Hull City	0–0	Macclesfield Town	H	G. Cain	3,677	
41	04.04.98	Doncaster Rovers	1–0	Hull City	A	Unknown	2,597	
42	11.04.98	Hull City	2–1	Hartlepool United	H	M. Messias	3,343	Brown (2)
43	13.04.98	Colchester United	4–3	Hull City	A	P. Taylor	4,700	Boyack, McGinty, Darby
44	18.04.98	Hull City	3–2	Leyton Orient	H	E. Wolstenhome	3,744	Mann, Lowthorpe, Boyack
45	25.04.98	Brighton & Hove Albion	2–2	Hull City	A	S. Bennett	3,888	Darby (2)
46	02.05.98	Hull City	1–0	Cambridge United	H	G. Singh	4,930	Darby

=== FA Cup ===
==== Matches ====
Win Draw Loss

#	Date	Home	Result	Away	Venue	Referee	Att.	Scorers
First	15.11.97	Hull City	0–2	Hednesford Town	H	D. Laws	6,091	

=== League Cup ===
==== Matches ====
Win Draw Loss

#	Date	Home	Result	Away	Venue	Referee	Att.	Scorers
First	12.08.97	Macclesfield Town	0–0	Hull City	A	Unknown	2,249	
First	26.08.97	Hull City	2–1	Macclesfield Town	H	S. Baines	3,300	Peacock, Joyce
Second	16.09.97	Hull City	1–0	Crystal Palace	H	Unknown	9,323	Darby
Second	30.09.97	Crystal Palace	2–1	Hull City	A	P. Durkin	6,407	Wright
Third	15.10.97	Newcastle United	2–0	Hull City	A	K. Lynch	35,856	

=== League Trophy ===
==== Matches ====
Win Draw Loss

#	Date	Home	Result	Away	Venue	Referee	Att.	Scorers
First	09.12.97	Hull City	2–1	Scarborough	H	M. Pike	1,518	Darby, Atkin (o.g.)
Second	06.01.98	Grimsby Town	1–0	Hull City	A	G. Stretton	4,778	

== Squad ==
Name	Position	Nationality	Place of birth	Date of birth (age) (Note: Players' ages listed as they were on 1 July 1997, the official start date of the 1997–98 season)	Previous club	Date signed	Fee
Goalkeepers
Scott Thomson	GK	SCO	Edinburgh	8 November 1966 (age 30)	(Scotland) Raith Rovers	25 July 1997	Free
Steve Wilson	GK	ENG	Hull	24 April 1974 (age 23)	Academy	4 May 1991	–
Defenders
Tony Brien	DF	IRE	Dublin	10 February 1969 (age 28)	West Bromwich Albion	12 July 1996	Free
Rob Dewhurst	DF	ENG	Keighley	10 September 1971 (age 25)	Blackburn Rovers	5 November 1993	Free
Antonio Doncel	DF	ESP	A Pobra de San Xiao	30 January 1967 (age 30)	(Spain) Racing de Ferrol	August 1996	Free
Mike Edwards	DF	ENG	Hessle	25 April 1980 (age 17)	Academy	July 1996	–
Kevin Gage	DF	ENG	Chiswick	21 April 1964 (age 33)	Preston North End	19 September 1997	Free
Mark Greaves	DF	ENG	Hull	22 January 1975 (age 22)	Brigg Town	17 June 1996	Unknown
Matt Hocking	DF	ENG	Boston	30 January 1978 (age 19)	Sheffield United	September 1997	Unknown
Adam Lowthorpe	DF	ENG	Hull	7 August 1975 (age 21)	Academy	July 1993	–
Scott Maxfield	DF	ENG	Doncaster	13 July 1976 (age 20)	Doncaster Rovers	27 March 1996	Unknown
Ben Morley	DF	ENG	Hull	22 December 1980 (age 16)	Academy	8 December 1997	–
Gregor Rioch	DF	ENG	Sutton Coldfield	24 June 1975 (age 22)	Peterborough United	July 1996	Unknown
Simon Trevitt	DF	ENG	Dewsbury	20 December 1967 (age 29)	Huddersfield Town	December 1995	£20,000
Ian Wright	DF	ENG	Lichfield	10 March 1972 (age 25)	Bristol Rovers	July 1996	Unknown
Midfielders
Patrick Dickinson	MF	CAN	Vancouver	6 May 1978 (age 19)	Academy	March 1997	–
Glyn Hodges	MF	WAL	(England) Streatham	30 April 1963 (age 34)	(Hong Kong) Sing Tao	August 1997	Free
Warren Joyce	MF	ENG	Oldham	20 January 1965 (age 32)	Burnley	July 1996	Unknown
Neil Mann	MF	SCO	(England) Nottingham	19 November 1972 (age 24)	Grantham Town	July 1993	Free
Richard Peacock	MF	ENG	Sheffield	29 October 1972 (age 24)	Sheffield F.C.	October 1993	Unknown
Mike Quigley	MF	ENG	Manchester	2 October 1970 (age 26)	Manchester City	July 1995	Unknown
David Rocastle	MF	ENG	Lewisham	2 May 1967 (age 30)	Chelsea	October 1997	Loan
Paul Wharton	MF	ENG	Newcastle	26 June 1977 (age 20)	Leeds United	February 1996	Free
Forwards
Chris Bettney	FW	ENG	Chesterfield	27 October 1977 (age 19)	Sheffield United	September 1997	Loan
Steven Boyack	FW	SCO	Edinburgh	4 September 1976 (age 20)	(Scotland) Rangers	February 1998	Loan
Andy Brown	FW	SCO	Edinburgh	11 October 1976 (age 20)	Leeds United	May 1996	Unknown
Duane Darby	FW	ENG	Birmingham	17 October 1973 (age 23)	Doncaster Rovers	27 March 1996	£25,000
Lee Ellington	FW	ENG	Bradford	3 July 1980 (age 16)	Academy	December 1996	–
Paul Fewings	FW	ENG	Hull	18 February 1978 (age 19)	Academy	August 1995	–
Gavin Gordon	FW	ENG	Manchester	24 June 1979 (age 18)	Academy	July 1995	–
Mark Hateley	FW	ENG	Derby	7 November 1961 (age 35)	(Scotland) Rangers	July 1997	Unknown
Brian McGinty	FW	SCO	East Kilbride	10 December 1976 (age 20)	(Scotland) Rangers	November 1997	Unknown
Dexter Tucker	FW	ENG	Pontefract	22 September 1979 (age 17)	Academy	January 1998	–
