= 1996–97 Hull City A.F.C. season =

English football club season

Hull City
1996–97 season
- Chairman: Martin Fish
- Manager: Terry Dolan
- Stadium: Boothferry Park
- Third Division: 17th
- FA Cup: Second round
- League Cup: First round
- Football League Trophy: Second round
- Top goalscorer: League: Darby (13); All: Darby (19)
- Average home league attendance: 3,413
Home colours	Away colours	Third colours

The 1996–97 season was the 93rd season in the history of Hull City Association Football Club and their first season back in the fourth tier since 1982–83 following relegation. Despite this, they had technically last competed in the Third Division in 1991–92, before the introduction of the Premier League led to the renaming of the tiers beneath it. In addition to the domestic league, Hull would also participate in the FA Cup, the League Cup, and the League Trophy.

== Season summary ==
A ten match unbeaten league run at the beginning of the 1996–97 season saw Hull remain in the top six until the beginning of October, but the side drifted towards a mid table placing by Christmas. The Tigers progressed through to the second round of the FA Cup following an extraordinary first round replay against Whitby Town. Duane Darby scored a double hat-trick in Hull's 8–4 victory.

Their league form was less impressive, and Hull finished in 17th place – their lowest ever position. The campaign was played out amid growing unrest from the dwindling support. The abuse generated against Dolan and chairman Martin Fish led Christopher Needler – son of the former chairman – to sell his major shareholding.

In July 1997, the Needler family's ownership of the club was at an end. David Lloyd, captain of the Great Britain Davis Cup tennis team and a multi-millionaire, was the new Hull City owner. He also acquired the Hull Rugby League club and ran the two in a joint operation.

== Final league table ==
Pos	Team	Pld	W	D	L	GF	GA	GD	Pts
15	Barnet	46	14	16	16	46	51	−5	58
16	Leyton Orient	46	15	12	19	50	58	−8	57
17	Hull City	46	13	18	15	44	50	−6	57
18	Darlington	46	14	10	22	64	78	−14	52
19	Doncaster Rovers	46	14	10	22	52	66	−14	52

Rules for classification: In the Football League goals scored (GF) takes precedence over goal difference (GD).

== Results ==
Hull City's score comes first

=== Legend ===
Win	Draw	Loss

=== Football League Third Division ===
Date	Opponent	Venue	Result	Attendance	Scorers
17 August 1996	Darlington	H	3–2	4,224	Darby (3)
24 August 1996	Carlisle United	A	0–0	5,407	
27 August 1996	Hereford United	A	1–0	2,820	Darby
31 August 1996	Barnet	H	0–0	4,605	
7 September 1996	Rochdale	H	1–1	3,451	Doncel
10 September 1996	Lincoln City	A	1–0	3,069	Peacock
14 September 1996	Colchester United	A	1–1	3,073	Gordon
21 September 1996	Hartlepool United	H	1–0	3,886	Darby
28 September 1996	Swansea City	A	0–0	2,961	
1 October 1996	Mansfield Town	H	1–1	3,579	Gordon
5 October 1996	Scunthorpe United	H	0–2	5,414	
12 October 1996	Leyton Orient	A	1–1	4,490	Brien
15 October 1996	Scarborough	A	2–3	3,425	Turner (2)
19 October 1996	Fulham	H	0–3	3,986	
26 October 1996	Wigan Athletic	A	2–1	3,887	Peacock, Trevitt
29 October 1996	Cardiff City	H	1–1	2,775	Gilbert
2 November 1996	Cambridge United	H	1–3	3,563	Brown
9 November 1996	Chester City	A	0–0	2,085	
20 November 1996	Torquay United	H	2–0	1,775	Darby, Peacock
23 November 1996	Exeter City	A	0–0	3,423	
30 November 1996	Wigan Athletic	H	1–1	3,537	Doncel
3 December 1996	Northampton Town	A	1–2	3,519	Darby
14 December 1996	Brighton & Hove Albion	A	0–3	3,762	
21 December 1996	Doncaster Rovers	H	3–1	2,830	Mason (2), Darby
26 December 1996	Lincoln City	H	2–1	4,892	Darby, Mason
1 January 1997	Hartlepool United	A	1–1	1,944	Joyce
11 January 1997	Swansea City	H	1–1	2,810	Mann
18 January 1997	Mansfield Town	A	0–1	2,286	
25 January 1997	Cardiff City	A	0–2	2,328	
1 February 1997	Chester City	H	1–0	2,513	Gordon
8 February 1997	Cambridge United	A	0–1	3,029	
15 February 1997	Exeter City	H	2–0	2,668	Joyce, Gordon
22 February 1997	Torquay United	A	1–1	2,072	Greaves
25 February 1997	Rochdale	A	2–1	1,349	Joyce, Darby
1 March 1997	Northampton Town	H	1–1	3,495	Darby
8 March 1997	Doncaster Rovers	A	0–0	3,274	
15 March 1997	Brighton & Hove Albion	H	3–0	3,373	Joyce (2), Darby
22 March 1997	Carlisle United	H	0–1	3,847	
29 March 1997	Darlington	A	0–1	3,024	
31 March 1997	Hereford United	H	1–1	2,818	Greaves
5 April 1997	Barnet	A	0–1	1,668	
12 April 1997	Scunthorpe United	A	2–2	4,257	Quigley, Lowthorpe
15 April 1997	Colchester United	H	1–2	2,035	Darby
19 April 1997	Leyton Orient	H	3–2	2,647	Peacock, Mann, Rioch (pen)
26 April 1997	Fulham	A	0–2	10,588	
3 May 1997	Scarborough	H	0–2	3,774	

=== FA Cup ===
Round	Date	Opponent	Venue	Result	Attendance	Goalscorers
R1	17 November 1996	Whitby Town	A	0–0	3,337	
R1R	26 November 1996	Whitby Town	H	8–4 (a.e.t.)	2,900	Darby (6), Peacock, Mann
R2	7 December 1996	Crewe Alexandra	H	1–5	3,756	Joyce

=== League Cup ===
Round	Date	Opponent	Venue	Result	Attendance	Goalscorers
R1 1st Leg	20 August 1996	Scarborough	H	2–2	2,134	Rioch, Quigley
R1 2nd Leg	3 September 1996	Scarborough	A	2–3 (lost 4–5 on agg)	2,656	Rioch (pen), Gordon

=== Football League Trophy ===
Round	Date	Opponent	Venue	Result	Attendance	Goalscorers
NR1	10 December 1996	Chester City	H	3–1	553	
NR2	28 January 1997	Carlisle United	A	0–4	3,716	

== Squad ==
Name	Position	Nationality	Place of birth	Date of birth (age) (Note: Players' ages listed as they were on 1 July 1996, the official start date of the 1996–97 season)	Previous club	Date signed	Fee
Goalkeepers
Roy Carroll	GK	NIR	Enniskillen	30 September 1977 (age 18)	(Northern Ireland) Ballinamallard United	September 1995	Unknown
Aidan Davison	GK	NIR	(England) Sedgefield	11 May 1968 (age 28)	Bolton Wanderers	November 1996	Loan
Steve Wilson	GK	ENG	Hull	24 April 1974 (age 22)	Academy	4 May 1991	–
Defenders
Neil Allison	DF	ENG	Hull	20 October 1973 (age 22)	Academy	May 1991	–
Tony Brien	DF	IRE	Dublin	10 February 1969 (age 27)	West Bromwich Albion	12 July 1996	Free
Rob Dewhurst	DF	ENG	Keighley	10 September 1971 (age 24)	Blackburn Rovers	5 November 1993	Free
Antonio Doncel	DF	ESP	A Pobra de San Xiao	30 January 1967 (age 29)	(Spain) Racing de Ferrol	August 1996	Free
Mike Edwards	DF	ENG	Hessle	25 April 1980 (age 16)	Academy	July 1996	–
Mark Greaves	DF	ENG	Hull	22 January 1975 (age 21)	Brigg Town	17 June 1996	Unknown
Adam Lowthorpe	DF	ENG	Hull	7 August 1975 (age 20)	Academy	July 1993	–
Scott Maxfield	DF	ENG	Doncaster	13 July 1976 (age 19)	Doncaster Rovers	27 March 1996	Unknown
Gregor Rioch	DF	ENG	Sutton Coldfield	24 June 1975 (age 21)	Peterborough United	July 1996	Unknown
Sam Sharman	DF	ENG	Hull	7 November 1977 (age 18)	Sheffield Wednesday	March 1997	Free
Simon Trevitt	DF	ENG	Dewsbury	20 December 1967 (age 28)	Huddersfield Town	December 1995	£20,000
Ian Wright	DF	ENG	Lichfield	10 March 1972 (age 24)	Bristol Rovers	July 1996	Unknown
Midfielders
Patrick Dickinson	MF	CAN	Vancouver	6 May 1978 (age 18)	Academy	March 1997	–
Stuart Elliott	MF	ENG	Hendon	27 August 1977 (age 18)	Newcastle United	March 1997	Loan
Kenny Gilbert	MF	SCO	Aberdeen	8 March 1975 (age 21)	(Scotland) Aberdeen	July 1996	Unknown
Warren Joyce	MF	ENG	Oldham	20 January 1965 (age 31)	Burnley	July 1996	Unknown
Neil Mann	MF	SCO	(England) Nottingham	19 November 1972 (age 23)	Grantham Town	July 1993	Free
Jamie Marks	MF	NIR	Belfast	18 March 1977 (age 19)	Leeds United	February 1996	Free
Richard Peacock	MF	ENG	Sheffield	29 October 1972 (age 23)	Sheffield F.C.	October 1993	Unknown
Mike Quigley	MF	ENG	Manchester	2 October 1970 (age 25)	Manchester City	July 1995	Unknown
Paul Wharton	MF	ENG	Newcastle	26 June 1977 (age 19)	Leeds United	February 1996	Free
Forwards
Andy Brown	FW	SCO	Edinburgh	11 October 1976 (age 19)	Leeds United	May 1996	Unknown
Duane Darby	FW	ENG	Birmingham	17 October 1973 (age 22)	Doncaster Rovers	27 March 1996	£25,000
Lee Ellington	FW	ENG	Bradford	3 July 1980 (age 15)	Academy	December 1996	–
Paul Fewings	FW	ENG	Hull	18 February 1978 (age 18)	Academy	August 1995	–
Gavin Gordon	FW	ENG	Manchester	24 June 1979 (age 17)	Academy	July 1995	–
Andy Mason	FW	ENG	Bolton	22 November 1974 (age 21)	Bolton Wanderers	July 1995	Free
Christian Sansam	FW	ENG	Hull	26 December 1975 (age 20)	Bradford City	November 1996	Free
Robbie Turner	FW	ENG	Easington	18 September 1966 (age 29)	Cambridge United	October 1996	Loan
