= 1994–95 Hull City A.F.C. season =

English football club season

Hull City
1994–95 season
- Chairman: Martin Fish
- Manager: Terry Dolan
- Stadium: Boothferry Park
- Second Division: 8th
- FA Cup: First round
- League Cup: First round
- League Trophy: First round
- Top goalscorer: League: Dean Windass (17); All: Dean Windass (17)
Home colours	Away colours

The 1994–95 season was the 91st season in the history of Hull City Association Football Club and their third consecutive season in the Second Division, yet their fourth consecutive season in the third tier. In addition to the domestic league, the club would also participate in the FA Cup, the League Cup, and the League Trophy.

== Competitions ==
=== Second Division ===
==== League table ====
Pos	Team	Pld	W	D	L	GF	GA	GD	Pts
6	Wycombe Wanderers	46	21	15	10	60	46	+14	78
7	Oxford United	46	21	12	13	66	52	+14	75
8	Hull City	46	21	11	14	70	57	+13	74
9	York City	46	21	9	16	67	51	+16	72
10	Swansea City	46	19	14	13	57	45	+12	71

==== Results summary ====
Overall								Home						Away					
Pld	W	D	L	GF	GA	GD	Pts	W	D	L	GF	GA	GD	W	D	L	GF	GA	GD
46	21	11	14	70	57	+13	74	13	6	4	40	18	+22	8	5	10	30	39	−9

Source: Soccerbase

==== Matches ====
Win Draw Loss

#	Date	Home	Result	Away	Venue	Scorers (Note: Hull scorers only)
1	13.08.94	Oxford United	4–0	Hull City	A	
2	20.08.94	Hull City	0–2	Swansea City	H	
3	27.08.94	Leyton Orient	1–1	Hull City	A	Brown
4	30.08.94	Hull City	2–0	Plymouth Argyle	H	Mann, Lee
5	03.09.94	Hull City	2–0	Chester City	H	Windass, Brown
6	10.09.94	Peterborough United	2–1	Hull City	A	Peacock
7	13.09.94	Wycombe Wanderers	1–2	Hull City	A	Dakin, Abbott
8	17.09.94	Hull City	0–2	Rotherham United	H	
9	24.09.94	Birmingham City	2–2	Hull City	A	Windass (pen.), Peacock
10	01.10.94	Hull City	3–1	Bournemouth	H	Brown, Dewhurst, Atkinson
11	08.10.94	Hull City	1–0	Blackpool	H	Gouck (o.g.)
12	15.10.94	Wrexham	2–2	Hull City	A	Windass, Lawford
13	22.10.94	Shrewsbury Town	2–3	Hull City	A	Lawford, Dewhurst, Peacock
14	29.10.94	Hull City	7–1	Crewe Alexandra	H	Windass (2), Brown (3), Dewhurst, Peacock
15	01.11.94	Hull City	3–0	York City	H	Windass, Brown, Lawford
16	05.11.94	Brentford	0–1	Hull City	A	Dewhurst
17	19.11.94	Hull City	0–2	Bristol Rovers	H	
18	25.11.94	Cardiff City	0–2	Hull City	A	Windass, Brown
19	10.12.94	Swansea City	2–0	Hull City	A	
20	17.12.94	Hull City	3–1	Oxford United	H	Fettis, Windass (2)
21	26.12.94	Hull City	1–0	Huddersfield Town	H	Peacock
22	28.12.94	Bradford City	1–0	Hull City	A	
23	31.12.94	Hull City	2–2	Brighton & Hove Albion	H	Windass, Brown
24	02.01.95	Cambridge United	2–2	Hull City	A	Windass, Brown
25	07.01.95	Hull City	2–2	Shrewsbury Town	H	Cox, Windass (pen.)
26	14.01.95	Stockport County	4–0	Hull City	A	
27	21.01.95	Hull City	1–2	Brentford	H	Joyce
28	04.02.95	Hull City	4–0	Cardiff City	H	Ormondroyd (2), Brown, Joyce
29	18.02.95	Hull City	0–0	Stockport County	H	
30	25.02.95	Bournemouth	2–3	Hull City	A	Mann, Ormondroyd (2)
31	01.03.95	Bristol Rovers	0–2	Hull City	A	Ormondroyd, Brown
32	04.03.95	Hull City	0–0	Birmingham City	H	
33	11.03.95	Hull City	2–0	Leyton Orient	H	Joyce, Dewhurst
34	18.03.95	Plymouth Argyle	2–1	Hull City	A	Ormondroyd
35	21.03.95	Hull City	1–1	Peterborough United	H	Breen (o.g.)
36	25.03.95	Rotherham United	2–0	Hull City	A	
37	28.03.95	Chester City	1–2	Hull City	A	Lund, Abbott
38	01.04.95	Hull City	0–0	Wycombe Wanderers	H	
39	04.04.95	York City	3–1	Hull City	A	Windass
40	08.04.95	Brighton & Hove Albion	1–0	Hull City	A	
41	15.04.95	Hull City	2–0	Bradford City	H	Windass (2)
42	17.04.95	Huddersfield Town	1–1	Hull City	A	Dewhurst
43	22.04.95	Hull City	1–0	Cambridge United	H	Dewhurst
44	29.04.95	Hull City	3–2	Wrexham	H	Lund, Windass, Dewhurst
45	02.05.95	Crewe Alexandra	3–2	Hull City	A	Lund, Abbott
46	06.05.95	Blackpool	1–2	Hull City	A	Fettis, Windass (pen.)

=== FA Cup ===
==== Matches ====
Win Draw Loss

#	Date	Home	Result	Away	Venue	Scorers
First	12.11.94	Hull City	0–1	Lincoln City	H	

=== League Cup ===
==== Matches ====
Win Draw Loss

#	Date	Home	Result	Away	Venue	Scorers
First	16.08.94	Hull City	2–1	Scarborough	H	Lee, Peacock
First	23.08.94	Scarborough	2–0	Hull City	A	

=== League Trophy ===
==== Matches ====
Win Draw Loss

#	Date	Home	Result	Away	Venue	Scorers
First	27.09.94	Hull City	0–2	Doncaster Rovers	H	
First	08.11.94	Lincoln City	1–0	Hull City	A	

== Squad ==
Name	Position	Nationality	Place of birth	Date of birth (age) (Note: Players' ages listed as they were on 1 July 1994, the official start date of the 1994–95 season)	Previous club	Date signed	Fee
Goalkeepers
Alan Fettis	GK	NIR	Newtownards	1 February 1971 (age 23)	(Northern Ireland) Ards	July 1991	£50,000
Steve Wilson	GK	ENG	Hull	24 April 1974 (age 20)	Academy	4 May 1991	–
Defenders
Neil Allison	DF	ENG	Hull	20 October 1973 (age 20)	Academy	May 1991	–
Paul Cox	DF	ENG	Nottingham	6 January 1972 (age 22)	Notts County	December 1994	Loan
Simon Dakin	DF	ENG	Nottingham	30 November 1974 (age 19)	Derby County	March 1994	Unknown
Rob Dewhurst	DF	ENG	Keighley	10 September 1971 (age 22)	Blackburn Rovers	5 November 1993	Free
Jimmy Graham	DF	SCO	Glasgow	5 November 1969 (age 24)	Rochdale	August 1994	Unknown
Gary Hobson	DF	ENG	North Ferriby	12 November 1972 (age 21)	Academy	April 1991	–
Adam Lowthorpe	DF	ENG	Hull	7 August 1975 (age 18)	Academy	July 1993	–
David Mail	DF	ENG	Bristol	12 September 1962 (age 31)	Blackburn Rovers	July 1990	Unknown
Ray Wallace	DF	ENG	Lewisham	2 October 1969 (age 24)	Stoke City	December 1994	Loan
Midfielders
Greg Abbott	MF	ENG	Coventry	14 December 1963 (age 30)	Guiseley	December 1992	Unknown
Graeme Atkinson	MF	ENG	Hull	11 November 1971 (age 22)	Academy	July 1989	–
Warren Joyce	MF	ENG	Oldham	20 January 1965 (age 29)	Burnley	January 1995	Loan
Craig Lawford	MF	ENG	Dewsbury	25 November 1972 (age 21)	Bradford City	June 1994	Unknown
Chris Lee	MF	ENG	Batley	18 June 1971 (age 23)	Scarborough	July 1993	Free
Neil Mann	MF	SCO	(England) Nottingham	19 November 1972 (age 21)	Grantham Town	July 1993	Free
Richard Peacock	MF	ENG	Sheffield	29 October 1972 (age 21)	Sheffield F.C.	October 1993	Unknown
Forwards
Linton Brown	FW	ENG	Hull	12 April 1968 (age 26)	Halifax Town	January 1993	Unknown
Matt Edeson	FW	ENG	Beverley	11 August 1976 (age 17)	Academy	October 1992	–
Paul Fewings	FW	ENG	Hull	18 February 1978 (age 16)	Academy	May 1995	–
Chris Hargreaves	FW	ENG	Cleethorpes	12 May 1972 (age 22)	Grimsby Town	July 1993	£50,000
Gary Lund	FW	ENG	Cleethorpes	13 September 1964 (age 29)	Notts County	March 1995	Loan
Ian Ormondroyd	FW	ENG	Bradford	22 September 1964 (age 29)	Leicester City	February 1995	Loan
Dean Windass	FW	ENG	Hull	1 April 1969 (age 25)	North Ferriby United	October 1991	Unknown
