= 1993–94 Hull City A.F.C. season =

English football club season

Hull City
1993–94 season
- Chairman: Martin Fish
- Manager: Terry Dolan
- Stadium: Boothferry Park
- Second Division: 9th
- FA Cup: Second round
- League Cup: First round
- League Trophy: First round
- Top goalscorer: League: Dean Windass (23); All: Dean Windass (24)
Home colours	Away colours

The 1993–94 season was the 90th season in the history of Hull City Association Football Club and their second consecutive season in the Second Division, yet their third consecutive season in the third tier. In addition to the domestic league, the club would also participate in the FA Cup, the League Cup, and the League Trophy.

== Competitions ==
=== Second Division ===
==== League table ====
Pos	Team	Pld	W	D	L	GF	GA	GD	Pts
7	Bradford City	46	19	13	14	61	53	+8	70
8	Bristol Rovers	46	20	10	16	60	59	+1	70
9	Hull City	46	18	14	14	62	54	+8	68
10	Cambridge United	46	19	9	18	79	73	+6	66
11	Huddersfield Town	46	17	14	15	58	61	−3	65

==== Results summary ====
Overall								Home						Away					
Pld	W	D	L	GF	GA	GD	Pts	W	D	L	GF	GA	GD	W	D	L	GF	GA	GD
46	18	14	14	62	54	+8	68	9	9	5	33	20	+13	9	5	9	29	34	−5

Source: Soccerbase

==== Matches ====
Win Draw Loss

#	Date	Home	Result	Away	Venue	Scorers (Note: Hull scorers only)
1	14.08.93	Barnet	1–2	Hull City	A	Abbott, Brown
2	21.08.93	Hull City	2–2	Plymouth Argyle	H	Windass (pen.), Brown
3	28.08.93	Cambridge United	3–4	Hull City	A	Brown, Windass (3)
4	31.08.93	Hull City	1–0	Brentford	H	Windass (pen.)
5	04.09.93	Hull City	3–0	Bristol Rovers	H	Windass (3)
6	11.09.93	Cardiff City	3–4	Hull City	A	Moran, Bound, Lee (2)
7	14.09.93	Wrexham	3–0	Hull City	A	
8	18.09.93	Hull City	2–1	Huddersfield Town	H	Brown, Atkinson
9	25.09.93	Reading	1–1	Hull City	A	Brown
10	02.10.93	Hull City	3–1	Bradford City	H	Windass, Brown, Abbott (pen.)
11	09.10.93	Port Vale	2–1	Hull City	A	Allison
12	16.10.93	Hull City	1–1	Fulham	H	Peacock
13	23.10.93	Swansea City	1–0	Hull City	A	
14	30.10.93	Hull City	0–1	Leyton Orient	H	
15	02.11.93	Blackpool	6–2	Hull City	A	Abbott (2)
16	06.11.93	Hull City	4–1	Rotherham United	H	Brown, Moran (3)
17	20.11.93	Bournemouth	0–2	Hull City	A	Atkinson, Brown
18	27.11.93	Hull City	0–1	Stockport County	H	
19	11.12.93	Plymouth Argyle	2–1	Hull City	A	Windass
20	18.12.93	Hull City	4–4	Barnet	H	Windass (3), Moran
21	27.12.93	York City	0–0	Hull City	A	
22	28.12.93	Hull City	1–0	Hartlepool United	H	Windass
23	01.01.94	Exeter City	0–1	Hull City	A	Windass
24	03.01.94	Hull City	1–2	Burnley	H	Abbott
25	08.01.94	Hull City	0–0	Brighton & Hove Albion	H	
26	15.01.94	Fulham	0–1	Hull City	A	Windass
27	22.01.94	Hull City	0–0	Port Vale	H	
28	29.01.94	Leyton Orient	3–1	Hull City	A	Williams
29	05.02.94	Hull City	0–1	Swansea City	H	
30	12.02.94	Brighton & Hove Albion	3–0	Hull City	A	
31	19.02.94	Hull City	2–0	Cambridge United	H	Atkinson, Windass
32	22.02.94	Brentford	0–3	Hull City	A	Atkinson, Brown, Windass
33	26.02.94	Bristol Rovers	1–1	Hull City	A	Atkinson
34	05.03.94	Hull City	1–0	Cardiff City	H	Windass (pen.)
35	12.03.94	Huddersfield Town	0–2	Hull City	A	Dewhurst, Windass
36	15.03.94	Hull City	0–0	Wrexham	H	
37	19.03.94	Hull City	1–2	Reading	H	Windass (pen.)
38	26.03.94	Bradford City	1–1	Hull City	A	Williams
39	29.03.94	Burnley	3–1	Hull City	A	Lee
40	02.04.94	Hull City	1–1	York City	H	Windass
41	04.04.94	Hartlepool United	0–1	Hull City	A	Norton
42	09.04.94	Hull City	5–1	Exeter City	H	Atkinson (2), Dewhurst, Norton, Windass
43	16.04.94	Hull City	0–0	Blackpool	H	
44	23.04.94	Rotherham United	1–0	Hull City	A	
45	30.04.94	Hull City	1–1	Bournemouth	H	Abbott
46	07.05.94	Stockport County	0–0	Hull City	A	

=== FA Cup ===
==== Matches ====
Win Draw Loss

#	Date	Home	Result	Away	Venue	Scorers
First	23.11.93	Runcorn	0–2	Hull City	A	Brown, Hargreaves
Second	04.12.93	Chester City	2–0	Hull City	A	

=== League Cup ===
==== Matches ====
Win Draw Loss

#	Date	Home	Result	Away	Venue	Scorers
First	17.08.93	Notts County	2–0	Hull City	A	
First	24.08.93	Hull City	3–1 (Note: Notts County won the tie on away goals)	Notts County	H	Abbott, Atkinson, Windass

=== League Trophy ===
==== Matches ====
Win Draw Loss

#	Date	Home	Result	Away	Venue	Scorers
First	19.10.93	Scunthorpe United	1–1	Hull City	A	Unknown
First	09.11.93	Hull City	0–2	Scarborough	H	

== Squad ==
Name	Position	Nationality	Place of birth	Date of birth (age) (Note: Players' ages listed as they were on 1 July 1993, the official start date of the 1993–94 season)	Previous club	Date signed	Fee
Goalkeepers
Alan Fettis	GK	NIR	Newtownards	1 February 1971 (age 22)	(Northern Ireland) Ards	July 1991	£50,000
Steve Wilson	GK	ENG	Hull	24 April 1974 (age 19)	Academy	4 May 1991	–
Defenders
Neil Allison	DF	ENG	Hull	20 October 1973 (age 19)	Academy	May 1991	–
Matthew Bound	DF	ENG	Melksham	9 November 1972 (age 20)	Southampton	August 1993	Loan
Simon Dakin	DF	ENG	Nottingham	30 November 1974 (age 18)	Derby County	March 1994	Unknown
Rob Dewhurst	DF	ENG	Keighley	10 September 1971 (age 21)	Blackburn Rovers	5 November 1993	Free
Gary Hobson	DF	ENG	North Ferriby	12 November 1972 (age 20)	Academy	April 1991	–
Adam Lowthorpe	DF	ENG	Hull	7 August 1975 (age 17)	Academy	July 1993	–
David Mail	DF	ENG	Bristol	12 September 1962 (age 30)	Blackburn Rovers	July 1990	Unknown
Rob Miller	DF	ENG	Manchester	3 November 1972 (age 20)	Oldham Athletic	October 1992	Free
Brian Mitchell	DF	SCO	Stonehaven	30 July 1963 (age 29)	Bristol City	August 1993	Unknown
Lee Warren	DF	ENG	Manchester	28 February 1969 (age 24)	Rochdale	August 1988	Unknown
Midfielders
Greg Abbott	MF	ENG	Coventry	14 December 1963 (age 29)	Guiseley	December 1992	Unknown
Graeme Atkinson	MF	ENG	Hull	11 November 1971 (age 21)	Academy	July 1989	–
Matty Hopkin	MF	ENG	Hull	17 October 1974 (age 18)	Academy	August 1993	–
Chris Lee	MF	ENG	Batley	18 June 1971 (age 22)	Scarborough	July 1993	Free
Neil Mann	MF	SCO	(England) Nottingham	19 November 1972 (age 20)	Grantham Town	July 1993	Free
Dave Norton	MF	ENG	Cannock	3 March 1965 (age 28)	Notts County	July 1991	Unknown
Richard Peacock	MF	ENG	Sheffield	29 October 1972 (age 20)	Sheffield F.C.	October 1993	Unknown
Dean Stowe	MF	ENG	Burnley	27 March 1975 (age 18)	Academy	March 1993	
Gareth Williams	MF	ENG	Newport	12 March 1967 (age 26)	Barnsley	January 1994	Loan
Forwards
Linton Brown	FW	ENG	Hull	12 April 1968 (age 25)	Halifax Town	January 1993	Unknown
Matt Edeson	FW	ENG	Beverley	11 August 1976 (age 16)	Academy	October 1992	–
Chris Hargreaves	FW	ENG	Cleethorpes	12 May 1972 (age 21)	Grimsby Town	July 1993	£50,000
Steve Moran	FW	ENG	Croydon	10 January 1961 (age 32)	Exeter City	August 1993	Free
Dean Windass	FW	ENG	Hull	1 April 1969 (age 24)	North Ferriby United	October 1991	Unknown
