= Andrew Mason (disambiguation) =

Andrew Mason (born 1981) is an American businessman, founder and former CEO of Groupon.

Andrew Mason may also refer to:

- Andrew Mason (cricketer, born 1943), English cricketer
- Andrew Mason (cricketer, born 1979), English cricketer
- Andy Mason (rugby) (born 1962), English rugby union and rugby league footballer
- Andy Mason (born 1974), English footballer
- Andrew Stephen Mason; see Mason family

== See also ==
- Harold Andrew Mason (1911–1993), English university lecturer
