= Lee Mason =

English football referee (born 1971)

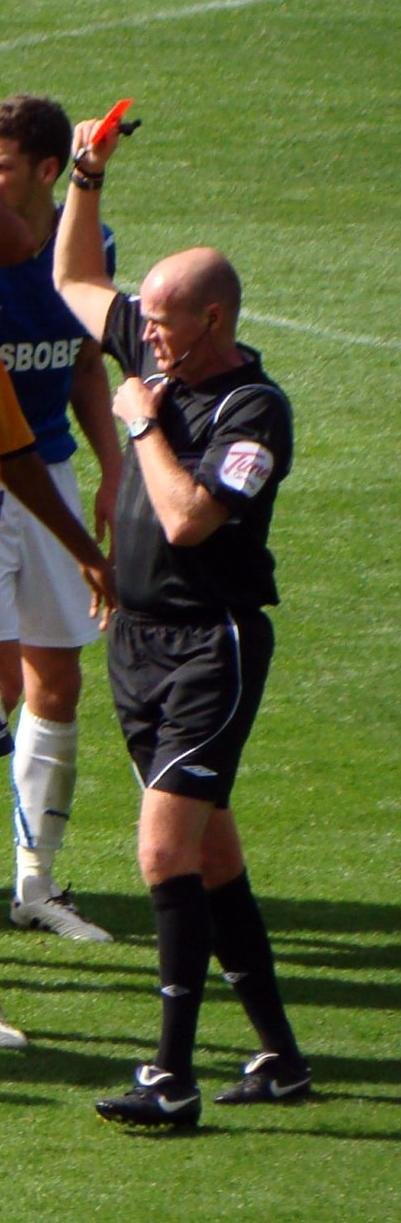
- Mason issues a red card during a match in 2010
- Full name: Lee Mason
- Born: 29 October 1971 (age 55); Bolton, Lancashire, England

Domestic
Years	League	Role
1992–1996	North West Counties League	Assistant referee
1996–1998	North West Counties League	Referee
1998–2000	Football League	Assistant referee
2000–2002	Premier League	Assistant referee
2002–2006	Football League	Referee
2006–2021	Premier League	Referee

Lee Mason (born 29 October 1971) is a retired referee from Bolton, Greater Manchester. From 2006 until 2021, Mason was on the list of Select Group Referees who officiated in the Premier League.

Mason is a former chairman of the Bolton Referees' Society and is associated with the Lancashire County Football Association.

== Education ==
Mason attended Thornleigh Salesian College in Bolton and then the Liverpool Institute of Higher Education between 1990 and 1993, living in Newman Hall, where he gained his degree. Whilst there he played for his college football team as well as being a regular compere, hosting a variety of social events at a students' union club.

== Family ==
Mason’s younger brother, Andy, is a former professional footballer who was a trainee at Bolton Wanderers, and played professionally for Hull City among others, before ending up playing in Non-League.

== Career ==
Mason took up the whistle in 1988, officiating in the Bolton Boys' Federation League. He previously worked in the car rental industry. In 1992, he was added to the North West Counties Football League assistant referees' list, and progressed to referee in that league four years later. He was included on The Football League list of assistant referees in 1998, and was added to the Premier League assistant referees' list in 2000.

In 2002, he was promoted to referee in the Football League, and his first match at that level was a Third Division match between Shrewsbury Town and Exeter City in August 2002, won 1–0 by the home side.

Also in 2002, he took charge of that year's FA County Youth Cup final between Birmingham and Durham, which Birmingham won 2–1.

Mason became a Development Group referee in 2003, and finally reached the Premier League list of Select Group Referees in 2006. His first Premier League appointment came in February 2006, when Middlesbrough lost 4–0 at home to Aston Villa.

Later in 2006, he was appointed to referee the Football League One play-off final between Barnsley and Swansea City at Cardiff's Millennium Stadium, which Barnsley won on penalties after a 2–2 draw after extra time.

He was widely praised in the press following his handling of a League Cup tie between Chelsea and Manchester United in October 2012. The two teams had met three days prior in an incident-filled Premier League fixture which United won 3–2 and Chelsea had two players sent off. During the League Cup match, Mason correctly awarded three penalties and was required to interpret and handle a number of other incidents. Chelsea won 5–4 after a 90th-minute penalty for the Blues, who were previously 3–2 down, forced the Cup tie into extra-time.

Mason retired from on-field duties at the end of the 2020–21 season, but became the league’s first dedicated Video Assistant Referee from the 2021–22 season. Mason left this position by mutual consent on February 17, 2023.

== Controversy ==
In March 2015, Mason caused controversy in a 1–1 draw between AFC Bournemouth and Cardiff City when he disallowed a goal scored by Bournemouth's Callum Wilson, who had had the ball kicked against his back by Cardiff goalkeeper Simon Moore, which then looped onto the crossbar before Wilson converted it into the unguarded net. Wilson was booked for a perceived foul, while commentators struggled to establish which rule had been broken.

In December 2020, Mason was severely criticised by Wolverhampton Wanderers coach Nuno Espírito Santo after a loss to Burnley, as not up to the Premier League standard for refereeing. Espírito Santo refused to apologise for his comments but admitted they constituted improper conduct and was later fined £25,000 by the Football Association.

On 27 February 2021, Mason controversially ruled out a goal by Brighton’s Lewis Dunk in a 1–0 defeat at West Bromwich Albion, causing strong criticism of Mason in the media and on Sky Sports. Mason had blown his whistle allowing a quick free-kick to be taken, before then blowing his whistle again after the free kick had been taken, denying Dunk the goal.

On 11 February 2023, Mason incorrectly allowed a Brentford goal to stand in a 1–1 draw against Arsenal at the Emirates Stadium, despite Brentford player Christian Nørgaard being in an offside position in the lead-up to the goal. The call drew widespread criticism and chief refereeing officer Howard Webb personally called Arsenal to apologize, citing "human error."

== Statistics ==
Season	Games	Total (yellow card)	(yellow card) per game	Total (red card)	(red card) per game
2002–03	24	94	3.92	3	0.13
2003–04	30	118	3.93	6	0.20
2004–05	36	108	3.00	3	0.08
2005–06	37	90	2.43	3	0.08
2006–07	33	87	2.64	3	0.09
2007–08	30	110	3.66	4	0.13
2008–09	34	132	3.88	8	0.23
2009–10	35	106	3.09	7	0.20
2010–11	33	135	4.09	5	0.15
2011–12	32	80	2.50	3	0.09
2012–13	30	108	3.60	3	0.11
2013–14	36	111	3.08	6	0.17
2014–15	33	101	3.06	6	0.18
2015–16	34	96	2.82	3	0.09
2016–17	25	96	3.84	3	0.12
2017–18	26	72	2.78	4	0.15
2018–19	32	99	3.09	3	0.09
2019–20	26	80	3.08	1	0.04
2020–21	22	46	2.09	2	0.09

Statistics are for all competitions. No records are available prior to 2002–03.
