= Dexter Tucker =

English footballer (born 1979)

Personal information
- Full name: Dexter Calbert Tucker
- Date of birth: 22 September 1979 (age 47)
- Place of birth: Pontefract, England
- Height: 6 ft 1 in (1.85 m)
- Position: Forward

Youth career
- –1997: Hull City

Senior career*
Years	Team	Apps	(Gls)
1997–1998	Hull City	7	(0)
1998–1999	Gainsborough Trinity		
- Selby Town
- * Club domestic league appearances and goals

Dexter Calbert Tucker (born 22 September 1979) is an English former professional footballer who played in the Football League as a forward.
