= Andrew Mason (cricketer, born 1979) =

English cricketer

Personal information
- Full name: Andrew Mark Mason
- Born: 16 March 1979 (age 47); Worcester, Worcestershire, England
- Batting: Right-handed
- Bowling: Right-arm off break

Domestic team information
- Years: Team
- 2001–2002: Herefordshire

Career statistics
Competition	List A
Matches	1
Runs scored	1
Batting average	1.00
100s/50s	–/–
Top score	1
Catches/stumpings	1/–
- Source: Cricinfo, 21 September 2023

Andrew Mason (born 16 March 1979) was an English cricketer. He was a right-handed batsman and a right-arm off-break bowler who played for Herefordshire. He was born in Worcester.

Mason, who appeared in the Minor Counties Championship and the ECB 38-County Cup between 1999 and 2002, made a single List A appearance for the team, in the C&G Trophy competition in September 2001. He scored a single run.
