= Andy Mason (rugby) =

English rugby footballer

Personal information
- Full name: Andrew Mason
- Born: 10 November 1962 (age 63) Leek Street Flats, Leeds, England

Playing information

Rugby union
Club
| Years | Team | Pld | T | G | FG | P |
|---|---|---|---|---|---|---|
| ≤1985–≤85 | Roundhay RFC |
| ≤1985–≤85 | Morley R.F.C. |
| | Total | 0 | 0 | 0 | 0 | 0 |
Representative
| Years | Team | Pld | T | G | FG | P |
| | Yorkshire |

Rugby league
- Position: Centre
Club
| Years | Team | Pld | T | G | FG | P |
|---|---|---|---|---|---|---|
| 1985–86 | Bramley | 44 | 26 |
| 1986–87 | Leeds |
| 1987–94 | Wakefield Trinity | 216 | 111 |
| | Total | 260 | 137 | 0 | 0 | 0 |
Representative
| Years | Team | Pld | T | G | FG | P |
| 1985–91 | Yorkshire | 7 | 2 | 0 | 0 | 8 |

Andrew Mason (born 10 November 1962) is an English former rugby union and professional rugby league footballer who played in the 1980s and 1990s. He played representative level rugby union (RU) for England (Schools 19 group) and Yorkshire, and at club level for Roundhay RFC and Morley R.F.C., and representative level rugby league (RL) for Yorkshire, and at club level for Bramley, Leeds and Wakefield Trinity (captain), as a centre.

== Background ==
Mason was raised in Leek Street Flats, Leeds, West Riding of Yorkshire, England.

== Rugby union ==
Mason won caps for England (Schools 19 group) (RU), and won caps for Yorkshire & The North of England (RU) while at Roundhay RFC and Morley R.F.C..

== Rugby league ==
=== Bramley ===
Mason changed rugby football codes from rugby union to rugby league when he transferred to Bramley. He made his debut for Bramley playing centre in the 12–19 defeat by Batley on 3 February 1985. He scored his first try for Bramley playing stand-off in the 16–19 defeat by Dewsbury on 13 March 1985, and scored a hat-trick in the 32-4 victory over Whitehaven a week later.

In November 1986, Mason was sold to Leeds in exchange for a £50,000 fee and Leeds fullback, David Healy.

=== Wakefield Trinity ===
In August 1987, the Leeds players; Mark Conway, Phil Fox, Andy Mason, and Keith Rayne, were transferred in exchange for the Wakefield Trinity players; John Lyons, and Gary Spencer.

Mason played centre and scored a try in Wakefield Trinity's 8–11 defeat by Castleford in the 1990–91 Yorkshire Cup Final during the 1990–91 season at Elland Road, Leeds on Sunday 23 September 1990, and played centre and scored a try in the 29–16 victory over Sheffield Eagles in the 1992–93 Yorkshire Cup Final during the 1992–93 season at Elland Road, Leeds on Sunday 18 October 1992.

=== Representative honours ===
Mason won caps for Yorkshire (RL) while at Bramley and Wakefield Trinity.

In October 1986, Mason was called up by Great Britain for the first Test against Australia during the 1986 Kangaroo tour, but was not selected in the final squad. He did not gain any caps for Great Britain during his career.
