= A. Bates =

American author

Auline Bates
- Occupation: Writer
- Writing career
- Pen name: A. Bates
- Period: 1989–present
- Genres: Fantasy, science fiction, children's literature, young adult fiction, fiction
- Notable works: Party Line, Final Exam, Mother's Helper, The Dead Game
- Website: www.aulinebates.com

Auline Bates is an American author who writes for young adults and adults. Her teen suspense novels, written as A. Bates, include Party Line, Final Exam, Mother's Helper, The Dead Game and Krazy 4 U.

The Wall Street Journal references Final Exam in an article about "wildly popular spooky tales and murder mysteries tailored for teenagers" in an article entitled "Gnarlatious Novels: Lurid Thrillers for the Teen Set". The Oregonian refers to Final Exam as one of four "new paperback hit thrillers", and Westword gives a paragraph to her book signing for Party Line and Final Exam.

== Publications ==
=== Teen Suspense ===
- Party Line (1989)
- Final Exam (1990)
- Mother's Helper (1991)
- Cross the Line (1992)
- The Dead Game (1993)
- Krazy 4 U (1996)
- See Kerry Run
- Lost and Found
- Speed Trap

=== Middle Grade ===
- Without Uncle Joe
- A Certain Spot in the Woods
- Best Friends Forever
- Mr. Jones's Bones
- Gathering Indio
- Belle in the Shadows (2012)
- Bad Alphonso (2012)
- The Waiting Room (2013)

=== Adult fiction ===
- Angel of Mercy
- On Angel Wings

=== Anthologies ===
- Thirteen: 13 Tales of Horror by 13 Masters of Horror – ed. T. Pines; contains Bates's short story Deathflash(1991)
