= Chris Bettney =

English footballer

Personal information
- Full name: Christopher John Bettney
- Date of birth: 27 October 1977 (age 49)
- Place of birth: Chesterfield, England
- Position: Right wing

Youth career
- Sheffield United

Senior career*
Years	Team	Apps	(Gls)
1996–1999	Sheffield United	1	(0)
1997–1998	→ Hull City (loan)	30	(1)
1999	Chesterfield	13	(0)
1999–2000	Rochdale	24	(0)
2000–2001	Macclesfield Town	2	(0)
2001–2002	Worksop Town	?	(?)
2002	Staveley MW	?	(?)
2002	South Normanton Athletic	?	(?)
2002	Ilkeston Town	?	(?)
2002–2006	Alfreton Town	?	(?)
2006–2008	Harrogate Town	37	(3)
2008	Bradford Park Avenue	0	(0)
2008–2010	Retford United	0	(0)
2010–	Worksop Town	11	(3)
2016–2017	Rainworth Miners Welfare		
- * Club domestic league appearances and goals

Chris Bettney (born 27 October 1977) is an English former professional footballer.

Born in Chesterfield, England, Bettney can also play up front and scored his first league goal for Harrogate Town with a volley against Farsley Celtic in a 1–0 home win on 7 February 2007. He added to his tally soon after with a free-kick away to Workington in Harrogate's 3–2 loss on 24 February 2007. In June 2008, he left Harrogate Town for Bradford Park Avenue. However, only six months later, he moved to Retford United, for whom he made his debut against Rushall Olympic.
