= Andrew Mason (cricketer, born 1943) =

English cricketer

Personal information
- Full name: Andrew Lindsey Mason
- Born: 22 September 1943 (age 83); Birmingham, Warwickshire, England
- Batting: Right-handed
- Role: Wicket-keeper

Domestic team information
- Years: Team
- 1963–1965: Oxford University

Career statistics
Competition	First-class
Matches	15
Runs scored	213
Batting average	11.21
100s/50s	–/–
Top score	47
Catches/stumpings	12/5
- Source: Cricinfo, 19 May 2020

Andrew Lindsey Mason (born 22 September 1943) is an English former first-class cricketer.

Mason was born at Birmingham in September 1943. He later studied at Brasenose College at the University of Oxford. While studying at Oxford, he played first-class cricket for Oxford University, making his debut against Lancashire at Oxford in 1963. He played first-class cricket for Oxford until 1965, making a total of fifteen appearances. Playing as a wicket-keeper, he scored a total of 213 runs in his fifteen matches at an average of 11.21 and with a high score of 47, while behind the stumps he took 12 catches and made five stumpings.
