= Craig Lawford =

English footballer

Personal information
- Full name: Craig Brian Lawford
- Date of birth: 25 November 1972 (age 53)
- Place of birth: Dewsbury, England
- Height: 5 ft 10 in (1.78 m)
- Position: Midfielder

Youth career
- Bradford City

Senior career*
Years	Team	Apps	(Gls)
1989–1994	Bradford City	20	(1)
1994–1996	Hull City	62	(3)
- Liversedge
Total		82	(4)
- * Club domestic league appearances and goals

Craig Brian Lawford (born 25 November 1972) is an English former professional footballer who played as a midfielder.

== Career ==
Born in Dewsbury, Lawford played for Bradford City, Hull City and Liversedge.

== Career statistics ==
Club	Season	League		FA Cup		League Cup		Other		Total	
Club	Season	Apps	Goals	Apps	Goals	Apps	Goals	Apps	Goals	Apps	Goals
Bradford City	1989–90	1	0	0	0	0	0	0	0	1	0
Bradford City	1990–91	0	0	0	0	0	0	0	0	0	0
Bradford City	1991–92	0	0	0	0	0	0	0	0	0	0
Bradford City	1992–93	8	1	1	0	0	0	2	0	11	1
Bradford City	1993–94	11	0	2	0	3	0	0	0	16	0
Bradford City	Total	20	1	3	0	3	0	2	0	28	1
Hull City	1994–95	31	3	1	0	2	0	2	0	36	3
Hull City	1995–96	31	0	1	0	4	0	3	1	39	1
Hull City	Total	62	3	2	0	6	0	5	1	75	4
Career total		82	4	5	0	9	0	7	1	103	5
