= Matt Hocking =

English footballer (born 1978)

Personal information
- Full name: Matthew James Hocking
- Date of birth: 30 January 1978 (age 48)
- Place of birth: Boston, England
- Position: Central defender

Senior career*
Years	Team	Apps	(Gls)
1995–1997	Sheffield United	0	(0)
1997–1999	Hull City	57	(2)
1999	→ York City (loan)	6	(0)
1999–2002	York City	91	(2)
2002–2004	Boston United	67	(1)
2004–2006	Stevenage Borough	54	(1)
2006–2007	Fisher Athletic	?	(?)
2007–2008	Southport	22	(0)
2008–2009	Gateshead	15	(0)
2009–2010	Boston Town	?	(?)
2010–2011	St Albans City	10	(0)

Managerial career
- 2012–2013: Boston Town
- * Club domestic league appearances and goals as of 07:59, 17 August 2009 (UTC)

Matthew James Hocking (born 30 January 1978 in Boston, England) is an English football defender.

Hocking joined Southport late in the January 2007 transfer window, from Conference South outfit Fisher Athletic. After a year and a half with the Sandgrounders, he signed for Gateshead on 18 August 2008. After making 13 starts and seven substitute appearances in total. Hocking was released by Gateshead.

He returned to his home-town of Boston, Lincolnshire and was linked with a return to Boston United. After training with the town's second non-League club, Boston Town. Hocking signed for the Poachers in July 2009. Hocking then went on to play for St Albans City, making his debut in the 3–0 away defeat to Dorchester Town in the FA Trophy First Round on 11 December 2010. He made 10 appearances for St Albans in the Conference South during the 2010–11 season.

In 2012, he was appointed joint manager of Boston Town alongside Ian Dunn. However, the two left the club in October the following year.
