= Antonio Doncel =

Spanish footballer

Personal information
- Full name: Antonio Doncel Valcárcel
- Date of birth: 30 January 1967 (age 59)
- Place of birth: A Pobra de San Xiao, Spain
- Height: 1.83 m (6 ft 0 in)
- Position: Defender

Senior career*
Years	Team	Apps	(Gls)
- CD Lugo
198x-1993	Deportivo de La Coruña	114	(2)
1993-1994	Real Burgos CF	29	(0)
1994-1995	Levante UD	17	(0)
1995-1996	Racing de Ferrol	22	(1)
1996-1998	Hull City	37	(2)
2001-2002	Bergantiños FC		
Total		219	(5)
- * Club domestic league appearances and goals

Antonio Doncel (born 30 January 1967 in Spain) is a Spanish retired footballer who last played for Bergantiños in his home country.

== Career ==
Doncel started his senior career with CD Lugo. In 1996, he signed for Hull City A.F.C. in the English Football League Third Division, where he made forty-three appearances and scored two goals. After that, he played for Spanish club Bergantiños before retiring in 2002.
