= Gregor Rioch =

English footballer (born 1975)

Personal information
- Date of birth: 24 June 1975 (age 51)
- Place of birth: Sutton Coldfield, England
- Position: Defender

Team information
- Current team: Wigan Athletic (Sporting Director)

Youth career
- Luton Town

Senior career*
Years	Team	Apps	(Gls)
1993–1995	Luton Town	0	(0)
1993	→ Barnet (loan)	6	(0)
1995–1996	Peterborough United	19	(0)
1996–1999	Hull City	106	(10)
1999–2001	Macclesfield Town	64	(6)
2001–2002	Shrewsbury Town	49	(2)
2002–2003	Northwich Victoria	38	(3)
2003–2004	Shrewsbury Town	19	(0)
2003	→ Northwich Victoria (loan)	7	(0)
2004	Leigh RMI	0	(0)
Total		308	(21)

Managerial career
- 2004–2006: Køge BK
- * Club domestic league appearances and goals

Gregor Rioch (born 24 June 1975) is an English football coach and former player. He is the Sporting Director of Wigan Athletic. His father is former Scotland International and Arsenal F.C. manager Bruce Rioch.

== Playing career ==
Born in Sutton Coldfield, England, Gregor Rioch started his football career as an apprentice at Luton Town, During this time he joined Barnet on loan where he made his league debut at the age of 18 in a 4–2 defeat to Leyton Orient. He moved to Peterborough United in 1995, before joining Hull City a year later and becoming the club captain at the age of 22. After three years with the Tigers he joined Macclesfield Town, under the management of Sammy McIlroy and Gil Prescott. Rioch left the Silkmen on transfer deadline day in 2001 and joined Kevin Ratcliffe at Shrewsbury Town. He spent 18 months at the Salop and was a key player during the 2001–02 season that just missed out on a play-off place in the last game of the season.

Rioch joined Northwich Victoria in 2002–03, before returning to Shrewsbury Town a year later for second spell under a new management regime of Jimmy Quinn and Dave Cooke who were previously in charge at Northwich Victoria. Rioch played 19 games for Shrewsbury Town that got promotion from the Conference back into the Football League via the play-offs.

Rioch returned to Northwich Victoria for a second spell in March 2003, this time on loan. He took the final game of the season as a caretaker manager following the sacking of Shaun Teale. Rioch finished an 11-year playing career with a short spell with Leigh RMI before going into management abroad.

Scotland selected Rioch for one of their youth sides, but he was ineligible to play for the national team because neither Greg nor his parents were born in Scotland, even though his father had captained Scotland.

== Coaching career ==
Rioch obtained a UEFA A licence coach at the age of 23 and became the holder of the UEFA Pro Licence coaching award in July 2011.

On leaving Leigh RMI, he was appointed manager of Danish club Køge BK. He spent two years as the youngest manager in Denmark at the age of 29 before returning to England in 2006 to coach Manchester City's under-17s, then their reserves. After only a year, he left to become the academy manager of Coventry City in 2007 and developed a number of talented players for the club's first team.

On 10 December 2013, it was announced that Rioch had joined Wigan Athletic as the club's new Academy Manager, and would be responsible for the club's young players between the ages of 9 and 21 years of age.

On 11 August 2023 it was announced that Rioch had been appointed as Sporting Director at Wigan Athletic, acting as the strategic lead for recruitment and all the club's football departments.
