= Jimmy Graham (footballer) =

Scottish footballer (born 1969)

Personal information
- Date of birth: 5 November 1969 (age 56)
- Place of birth: Glasgow, Scotland
- Position: Left back

Senior career*
Years	Team	Apps	(Gls)
1988–1990	Bradford City	7	(0)
1989–1990	→ Rochdale (loan)	11	(0)
1990–1994	Rochdale	126	(1)
1994–1996	Hull City	63	(1)
1996–1997	Guiseley		
1997–2002	Lancaster City		
Total		207	(2)
- * Club domestic league appearances and goals

Jimmy Graham (born 5 November 1969) is a Scottish former professional footballer who played as a left back.

== Career ==
Born in Glasgow, Graham played for Bradford City, Rochdale, Hull City, Guiseley and Lancaster City.

== Personal life ==
His brothers include fellow players Arthur and Tommy. In 2007, he was working as a social worker in Glasgow.
