= Ian Wright (footballer, born 1972) =

English footballer

Personal information
- Full name: Ian Matthew Wright
- Date of birth: 10 March 1972 (age 54)
- Place of birth: Lichfield, England
- Position: Centre back

Youth career
- 1988–1990: Stoke City

Senior career*
Years	Team	Apps	(Gls)
1990–1993	Stoke City	6	(0)
1992	→ Corby Town (loan)		
1993–1996	Bristol Rovers	54	(1)
1996–1998	Hull City	73	(2)
1998–2003	Hereford United	171	(22)
2003–2004	Burton Albion	22	(2)
2005–2006	Hednesford Town	12	(1)
2006–2007	Chasetown	9	(0)
Total		347	(28)
- * Club domestic league appearances and goals

Ian Matthew Wright (born 10 March 1972) is an English former footballer who played as a central defender. He started his career at Stoke City and later played for Bristol Rovers and Hull City before dropping down into non-league football with Hereford United.

== Career ==
Wright started his career at Second Division side Stoke City's youth team. He passed through the youth ranks at City and was handed a professional contract with the club in 1990. He made his debut against Swindon Town on the final day of the 1989–90 season with Stoke already relegated to the Third Division. He struggled to establish himself in the first team and joined non-league Corby Town in 1992. He made just nine appearances for The "Potters" before he was released in 1993. He joined Bristol Rovers and spent three years with The "Pirates" and then joined Hull City in 1996. At Hull he became a regular in the side and made 73 league appearances. He is also remembered at Hull for scoring a crucial goal as they knocked Premier League side Crystal Palace out of the 1997–98 League Cup.

Wright joined Hereford United in 1998 and became club captain and was a solid, first choice centre back through some of Hereford's most troubled times. He scored several vital goals for the club, including two in the 2001–02 FA Cup against Wrexham and Swindon. He played almost 200 competitive matches for the club, scoring almost 30 goals. He left in 2003, having trained as an electrician and wishing to play part-time. He joined Burton Albion, where he scored on his debut, until a persistent ankle injury forced him to retire. However a year later he was back in action as defensive cover at Hednesford Town.

Wright signed for Chasetown but in February 2007 he announced his retirement from the game due to a serious injury to his cheekbone/eye socket which could have caused him blindness if he had carried on playing.

== Career statistics ==
Club	Season	League			FA Cup		League Cup		Other^{[A]}		Total	
Club	Season	Division	Apps	Goals	Apps	Goals	Apps	Goals	Apps	Goals	Apps	Goals
Stoke City	1989–90	Second Division	1	0	0	0	0	0	0	0	1	0
Stoke City	1990–91	Third Division	1	0	0	0	0	0	0	0	1	0
Stoke City	1991–92	Third Division	3	0	0	0	1	0	0	0	4	0
Stoke City	1992–93	Second Division	1	0	0	0	1	0	1	0	3	0
Stoke City	Total		6	0	0	0	2	0	1	0	9	0
Bristol Rovers	1993–94	Second Division	29	0	1	0	0	0	3	0	33	0
Bristol Rovers	1994–95	Second Division	7	1	0	0	0	0	1	0	8	1
Bristol Rovers	1995–96	Second Division	18	0	1	0	2	0	2	0	21	0
Bristol Rovers	Total		54	1	1	0	2	0	6	0	63	1
Hull City	1996–97	Third Division	40	0	3	0	2	0	2	1	47	1
Hull City	1997–98	Third Division	33	2	1	0	5	1	1	0	40	3
Hull City	Total		73	2	4	0	7	1	3	1	87	4
Hereford United	1998–99	Football Conference	1	1	0	0	0	0	0	0	1	1
Hereford United	1999–2000	Football Conference	33	6	4	0	0	0	1	0	38	6
Hereford United	2000–01	Football Conference	34	3	0	0	0	0	5	1	39	4
Hereford United	2001–02	Football Conference	37	4	2	2	0	0	0	0	39	6
Hereford United	2002–03	Football Conference	28	1	1	0	0	0	0	0	29	1
Hereford United	Total		133	15	7	0	0	0	6	1	146	16
Burton Albion	2003–04	Football Conference	19	2	0	0	0	0	0	0	19	2
Burton Albion	2004–05	Conference National	1	0	0	0	0	0	0	0	1	0
Burton Albion	Total		20	2	0	0	0	0	0	0	20	2
Career Total			286	20	12	0	11	1	10	1	325	23

A. The "Other" column constitutes appearances and goals in the Football League Trophy.
