= Jamie Marks =

Northern Irish footballer and manager

Personal information
- Date of birth: 18 March 1977 (age 49)
- Place of birth: Belfast, Northern Ireland
- Position: Midfielder

Youth career
- 1993–1995: Leeds United

Senior career*
Years	Team	Apps	(Gls)
1995–1997	Hull City	15	(0)
1996	→ Linfield (loan)	4	(0)
1997–2003	Linfield	95	(7)
2003–2005	Ballymena United	32	(4)
2005–2008	Portadown	48	(0)
2008–2010	Crusaders	12	(0)
2010–2012	H&W Welders	?	(?)

Managerial career
- 2012–2015: Shankill United
- * Club domestic league appearances and goals

Jamie Marks (born 18 March 1977) is a Northern Irish retired football player and coach.

== Career ==
He joined Leeds as a trainee in 1993 and represented Northern Ireland Schoolboys and Youth teams. He started fifteen games and came off the bench twice in 1993-94 for the Juniors and he made one substitute appearance for the Reserves. He did not sign professional forms for Leeds but in April 1994 he signed for Hull City. He started eleven League games for the Tigers and came off the bench four times. In 1996 he went on loan to Linfield where he played four games. He signed permanently for them in the 1997 close season and went on to score seven goals in ninety-five appearances before moving to Ballymena United in 2003 and scored four goals in thirty-two games in two seasons. He joined Portadown in the 2005 close season and made forty-eight appearances, without scoring in three seasons. He joined Crusaders in 2008 and played twelve games without scoring before joining Belfast side, Harland & Wolff Welders in 2010.

== Honours ==
Linfield

- Irish League (2): 2000, 2001
- Irish Cup (1): 2002
- Irish League Cup (4): 1998, 1999, 2000, 2002
- County Antrim Shield (2): 1998, 2001

Springfield Star

- Under 15 Supplementary Cup (1):2016/17
