= Tony Brien =

Irish footballer (1969–2023)

Personal information
- Full name: Anthony James Brien
- Date of birth: 10 February 1969
- Place of birth: Dublin, Ireland
- Date of death: 1 August 2023 (aged 54)
- Height: 5 ft 11 in (1.80 m)
- Position: Defender

Senior career*
Years	Team	Apps	(Gls)
1987–1988	Leicester City	16	(1)
1988–1994	Chesterfield	204	(8)
1993–1995	Rotherham United	43	(2)
1995	Sheffield Wednesday (loan)	0	(0)
1995–1996	West Bromwich Albion	2	(0)
1995–1996	→ Mansfield Town (loan)	4	(0)
1995–1996	→ Chester City (loan)	8	(0)
1996–1998	Hull City	47	(1)
1998	Stalybridge Celtic	?	(?)
Total		278	(12)
- * Club domestic league appearances and goals

Anthony James Brien (10 February 1969 – 1 August 2023) was an Irish footballer who played in the Football League for Leicester City, Chesterfield, Rotherham United, West Bromwich Albion, Mansfield Town, Chester City and Hull City.

Brien was born in Dublin, Ireland on 10 February 1969.

In January 2017, amid the United Kingdom football sexual abuse scandal, Brien alleged abuse by former Leicester City scout Ted Langford in the 1980s; more detail emerged in September 2017, implicating former Aston Villa manager Graham Taylor in a cover-up of the abuse.

Tony Brien died on 1 August 2023, at the age of 54.
