= Lee Ellington =

English footballer (born 1980)

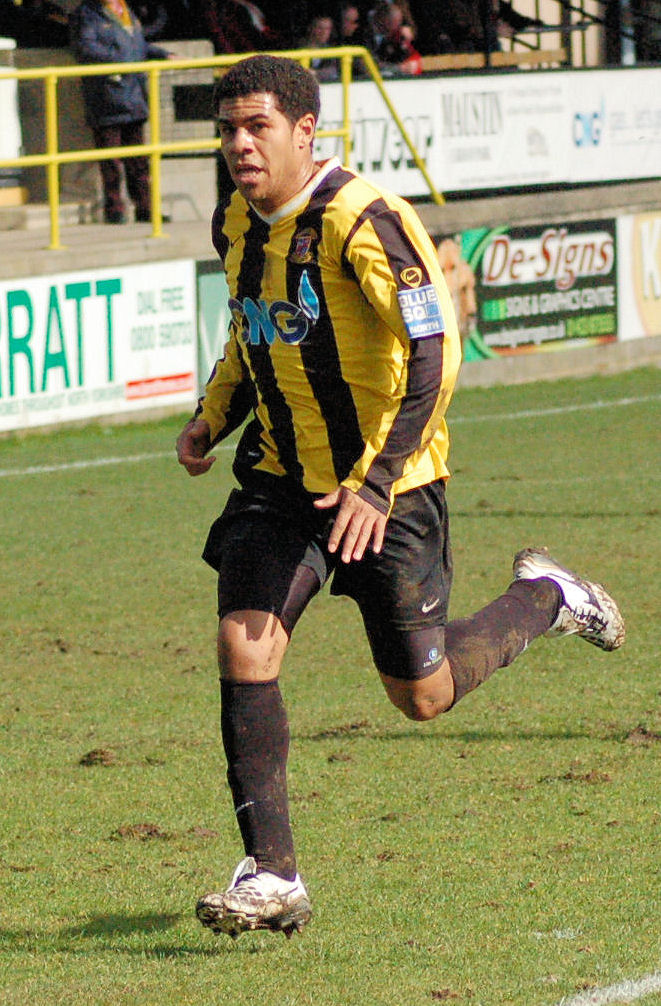

Personal information
- Full name: Lee Simon Ellington
- Date of birth: 3 July 1980 (age 46)
- Place of birth: Bradford, England
- Height: 5 ft 10 in (1.78 m)
- Position: Striker

Youth career
- –1996: Hull City

Senior career*
| Years | Team | Apps | (Gls) |
| 1996–2000 | Hull City | 24 | (2) |
| 1999–2000 | → Altrincham (loan) | 2 | |
| 2000 | Exeter City | 1 | (0) |
| 2000 | Finn Harps | 1 | (0) |
| 2000–2005 | Gainsborough Trinity | | (100) |
| 2005–2009 | Stalybridge Celtic | 148 | (65) |
| 2009–2010 | Farsley Celtic | | |
| 2010 | Droylsden | 1 | (0) |
| 2010–2012 | Harrogate Town | 35 | (8) |
| 2012–2013 | Guiseley | 39 | (9) |
| 2013–2014 | Farsley AFC | | |
- * Club domestic league appearances and goals

Lee Simon Ellington (born 3 July 1980) is an English former professional footballer who played as a striker.

Ellington notably played in the Football League for Hull City and Exeter City but was more prominently a Non-league striker with lengthy spells at Gainsborough Trinity and Stalybridge Celtic. He also played for Altrincham, Farsley Celtic, Droylsden, Harrogate Town, Guiseley and Farsley AFC. He spent a brief spell in the League of Ireland with Finn Harps in 2000.

== Career ==
Born in Bradford, West Yorkshire, Ellington started his career at Hull City with a first team appearance aged just 16. A fringe player for his four years with Hull, he scored two goals in 24 appearances. After joining Stalybridge Celtic, he became one of the most prolific marksmen in the Conference North.

Ellington averaged 20 goals a season for Gainsborough Trinity for five years since he joined them in 2000 from Exeter City and attracted the attention of several league scouts thanks to his prolific goal scoring abilities. On 15 June 2009, Ellington joined Conference North side Farsley Celtic. Ellington is from a sporting family; his younger brother Nathan Ellington is also a footballer.

After Farsley Celtic went into administration, Ellington joined Conference North side Droylsden FC, however, this would be a short lived spell as he left after one game.

On 18 March 2010, Ellington joined Conference North side Harrogate Town until the end of the 2010–11 season. His debut came on 27 March when he scored twice in a 3–3 draw against Ilkeston Town. By the end of the season Ellington had made nine appearances, scoring four goals.

He joined Guiseley, leaving the club in May 2012 and retired in 2014 whilst with Farsley AFC.

== Personal life ==
Ellington is from a sporting family; his cousin Nathan Ellington is a former Premier League striker.
