= Greg Abbott (footballer) =

English footballer & coach (born 1963)

Personal information
- Full name: Gregory Stephen Abbott
- Date of birth: 14 December 1963 (age 62)
- Place of birth: Coventry, England
- Height: 5 ft 9 in (1.75 m)
- Positions: Right back; midfielder

Team information
- Current team: Harrogate Town (youth coach)

Youth career
- 1980–1982: Coventry City

Senior career*
Years	Team	Apps	(Gls)
1982	Coventry City	0	(0)
1982–1991	Bradford City	281	(38)
1991–1992	Halifax Town	28	(1)
1992	Guiseley		
1992–1996	Hull City	124	(15)
Total		431	(54)

Managerial career
- 1998–1999: Thackley (joint manager)
- 2007: Carlisle United (caretaker)
- 2008: Carlisle United (caretaker)
- 2008–2013: Carlisle United
- 2018: Bradford City (caretaker)
- * Club domestic league appearances and goals

Gregory Stephen Abbott (born 14 December 1963) is an English football coach and former player who is a youth coach at Harrogate Town.

He played as a right back or midfielder. Abbott was the manager of Carlisle United from December 2008 until September 2013.

Born in Coventry, Abbott started his career with his hometown team Coventry City. He was released without playing a game but recommended to Bradford City, where he won the Division Three title in the 1984–85 season and went on to play more than 300 games. He had spells with Halifax Town and non-league Guiseley before he returned to The Football League with former manager Terry Dolan at Hull City. He spent four seasons with Hull playing another 100 games to take his career total to in excess of 500 first team matches.

After retiring, he went into coaching. He spent a decade at Leeds United coaching a number of junior and reserve sides, before he was appointed assistant manager of Carlisle United in 2006. He spent a brief spell as caretaker manager in 2007. He was given the job full-time in December 2008, after the dismissal of John Ward.

== Playing career ==
=== Coventry City ===
Abbott was born in Coventry, Warwickshire, on 14 December 1963. He started his football career with his hometown club Coventry City, first signing schoolboy forms, before becoming an apprentice in June 1980. He developed through the junior and reserve teams to sign a professional contract in January 1982 but at the end of the season he was given a free transfer without making a league appearance for the Division One side. The youth development team at Coventry City instead recommended Abbott to Bradford City, where he was given a trial in July, before earning a one-year contract at the newly promoted Division Three club.

=== Bradford City ===
Abbott had to wait eight months for his first team debut, which came in a 3–1 defeat to Plymouth Argyle at right back. However, he was a regular member of the club's reserve side, which won the 1983 Northern Intermediate League Cup. Abbott finished with 11 first team games in his first season with City at full back or in midfield, who finished 12th in the first season in Division Three.

Abbott became a more regular member of the first team the following season as City won just one of their first 15 games, following a summer where the club was nearly closed. However the club resigned striker Bobby Campbell from Derby County and embarked on a club record ten consecutive victories, during which Abbott scored his first senior goal as City defeated Lincoln City. The club eventually finished seventh after winning only once in the final six fixtures of the season. Abbott finished the season with four goals from 39 games, which included starting the final 20 games of the season.

During the summer of 1984, City signed winger John Hendrie, who had played with Abbott at Coventry, as well as defender Dave Evans. Abbott missed two of the season's first six games and was substitute for another two, but after that he missed only two more as City won the title by four points. Abbott's games again were shared between his roles in midfield and at full back as he weighed in with six league goals, four from penalties. City's joy, however, was overshadowed on the final day of the season against Lincoln City, when the game was abandoned because of a fire killing 56 supporters, only an hour after the team had paraded the Division Three trophy.

City played their home games at a number of grounds during the 1985–86 season during the redevelopment of their Valley Parade ground. That season, Abbott had his best season in terms of goals, scoring 13 times, which included ten in the league, and a total of nine penalties; his tally helped Abbott to be the club's joint top goalscorer tied with John Hendrie. Despite having no home ground, City finished in mid-table in Division Two. He added another ten the following season, which included a penalty against top flight side Newcastle United in the League Cup. Despite struggling during the first half of the season, City returned to Valley Parade and ended in tenth position thanks to seven games in the final nine fixtures under new manager Terry Dolan.

On 16 September 1987, Abbott scored the first hat-trick of his career to give City a 3–1 victory against Plymouth Argyle and elevate them to the top of the division. City remained in promotion contention for most of the season, with Abbott playing 32 games, though he did not start in any of the final eight fixtures, as City missed out on promotion after losing the final two matches. Abbott returned to the side for the play-off semi-final matches against Middlesbrough, which City lost 3–2 on aggregate to prevent them from winning promotion to Division One.

As a result of the defeat, both Stuart McCall and John Hendrie left the club and City could not maintain their form finishing in the bottom half for the first time in three years. Abbott was limited to just 23 league starts. Abbott was more of a regular the following season, playing 40 games in all competitions, but City were relegated back to Division Three.

John Docherty had taken over as City manager and Abbott's first team opportunities were limited with Docherty favouring a number of players he had bought from his former team Millwall. Abbott left City at the end of the first season back in Division Three one season short of his testimonial year, with his last start coming in January 1991. He had played 281 league games with the club, scoring 38 goals. Abbott claimed Docherty had split the dressing room and said: "I thought John Docherty was a disaster."

=== Later career ===
Abbott signed for City's West Yorkshire neighbours Halifax Town for a fee of £25,000. He spent just over a season with Halifax, in Division Four, but played only 28 league games, and a total of 34 matches, before he left because of injury. He moved to non-league side Guiseley for three months, before he was given another chance in the Football League, by his former manager Terry Dolan, who was now in charge of Hull City. Abbott scored on his debut against Doncaster Rovers in a Football League Trophy game. He spent four seasons at Hull, playing 124 games and scoring 15 goals before he retired in 1996.

== Coaching career ==
=== Leeds United ===
When he finished his playing career, Abbott was invited to join the Leeds United coaching staff, by Ces Podd, who had played with Abbott at Bradford City. Abbott worked with Brian Kidd at Leeds' academy with the teams from under 10s to under 18s level. He also had a brief stint as reserves team manager, but wanted to coach senior teams. He turned down an offer from Paul Jewell, another player Abbott knew from his time at Bradford City, to do some short-term coaching at Wigan Athletic. During his time with Leeds he also spent a brief period as assistant manager at his former side Guiseley before he resigned in February 1998. Five months after leaving Guiseley, he also combined his role at Leeds, with that of joint manager of Thackley, a role he shared with another former Guiseley coach Brendan Hudson. He resigned in January 1999, to concentrate on his role with Leeds United as well as radio commentary with BBC Radio Leeds.

=== Carlisle United ===
In July 2006, he joined Carlisle United as assistant manager to Neil McDonald. When McDonald was sacked by Carlisle on 13 August 2007, Abbott was appointed as caretaker manager. He won five of his ten games in charge to guide Carlisle to fourth position, before Carlisle appointed Cheltenham Town manager John Ward as their new boss in October; Abbott returned to his original assistant manager role with the club and signed a new two-year contract. The pair led Carlisle to the League One play-offs where they were defeated by Leeds United in the semi-finals.

When Ward left the club after 13 months in charge following a run of nine defeats in ten games, which left the club in 20th place, Abbott was once again appointed caretaker manager. Abbott's first game as caretaker was an FA Cup game with Conference National-side Grays Athletic, in which they were only six minutes from being knocked out, before a late equaliser avoided an upset to force a replay. He won three games while in caretaker charge and was appointed the club's permanent manager on 5 December 2008 on an 18-month contract. After a poor start to the 2013–14 season Abbott was sacked on 9 September 2013.

=== Notts County ===
On 6 November 2013, Abbott was appointed Assistant Manager to Shaun Derry at Notts County. He was sacked in March 2015.

=== Bradford City ===
After a spell at Cambridge United, he returned to Bradford City as Chief Scout in July 2016. He became caretaker manager in February 2018. He became assistant manager in June 2018. He said he was happy to be the third member of the three-man management set-up. He left the club in November 2018. He later spoke about how "tough" it was working for then-chairman Edin Rahic, and how he felt the club had found itself again with new manager Gary Bowyer.

=== Mansfield Town ===
He became Head of Football Operations for Mansfield Town in December 2018. He left the club in May 2019.

=== Return to Notts County ===
On 19 August 2020, Abbot rejoined Notts County as assistant manager to Neal Ardley. On 24 March 2021, it was announced that Greg and Neal Ardley would be leaving the club.

=== Return to Carlisle United ===
In May 2022 he became head of recruitment at Carlisle United. He left the role in May 2025.

=== Harrogate Town ===
In August 2025 he joined the youth coaching staff at Harrogate Town.

== Personal life ==
In April 2018, it was announced that Abbott was suffering from prostate cancer. In May 2018 Abbott underwent an operation and returned to work.

== Managerial statistics ==
Updated 10 February 2018

Managerial record by team and tenure
Team	From	To	Record				
Team	From	To	P	W	D	L	Win %
Carlisle United (caretaker)	13 August 2007	3 October 2007	10	5	3	2	50.0
Carlisle United	3 November 2008	9 September 2013	261	90	73	98	34.5
Bradford City (caretaker)	5 February 2018	11 February 2018	1	0	1	0	0.0
Total			272	95	77	100	34.9

== Honours ==
=== As a player ===
Bradford City

- Football League Third Division: 1984–85

=== As a manager ===
Carlisle United

- Football League Trophy: 2010–11; runner-up: 2009–10
