= Dean Windass =

English footballer (born 1969)

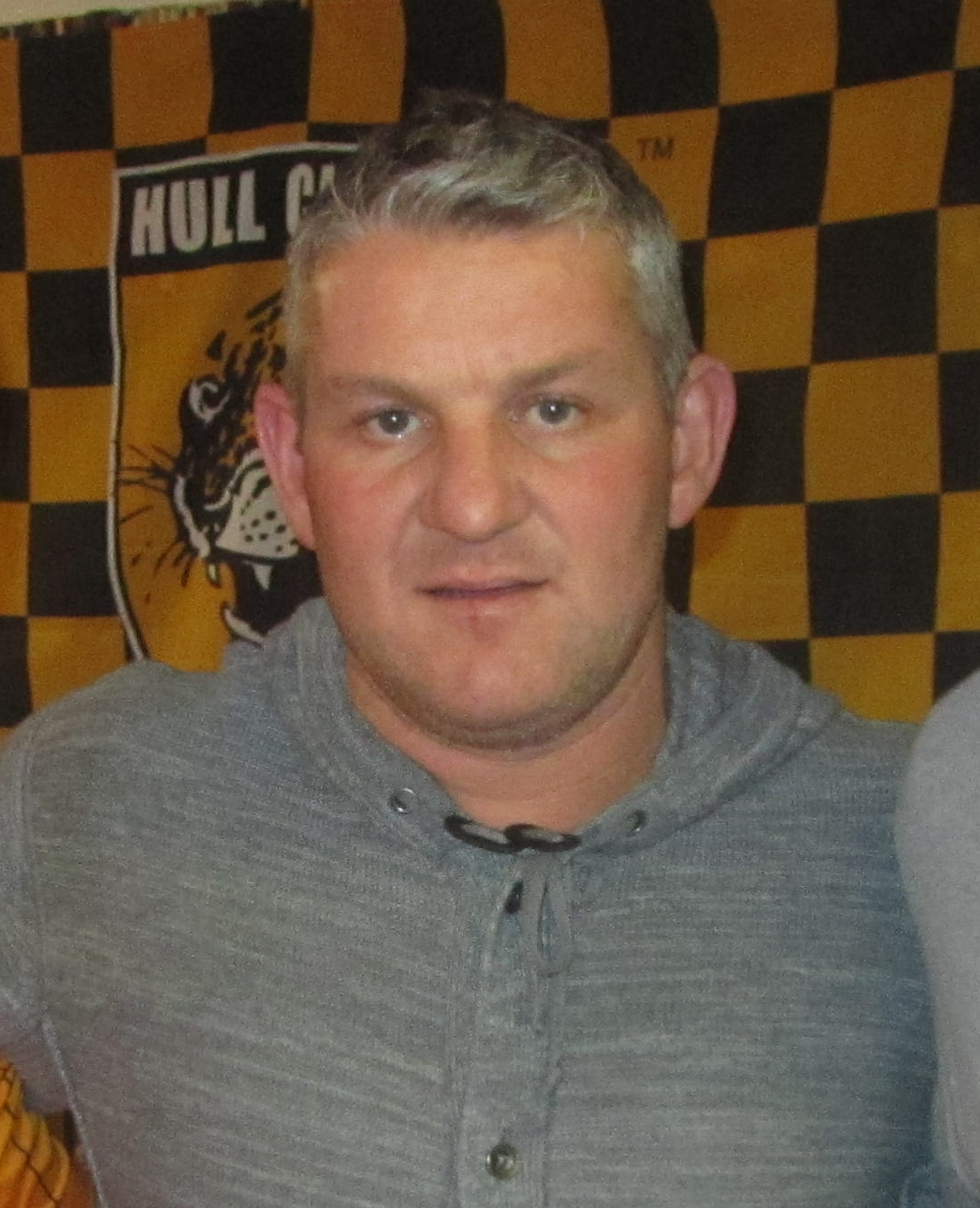
- Windass in 2011

Personal information
- Full name: Dean Windass
- Date of birth: 1 April 1969 (age 57)
- Place of birth: Kingston upon Hull, England
- Height: 5 ft 10 in (1.78 m)
- Positions: Midfielder; striker

Youth career
- Hull City

Senior career*
| Years | Team | Apps | (Gls) |
| 1990–1991 | North Ferriby United | | |
| 1991–1995 | Hull City | 176 | (57) |
| 1995–1998 | Aberdeen | 73 | (21) |
| 1998–1999 | Oxford United | 33 | (15) |
| 1999–2001 | Bradford City | 74 | (15) |
| 2001–2003 | Middlesbrough | 37 | (3) |
| 2001 | → Sheffield Wednesday (loan) | 2 | (0) |
| 2002 | → Sheffield United (loan) | 4 | (3) |
| 2003 | Sheffield United | 16 | (3) |
| 2003–2007 | Bradford City | 142 | (60) |
| 2007 | → Hull City (loan) | 18 | (8) |
| 2007–2009 | Hull City | 42 | (12) |
| 2009 | → Oldham Athletic (loan) | 11 | (1) |
| 2009 | Darlington | 6 | (0) |
| 2010 | Barton Town Old Boys | | |
| 2010–2012 | Scarborough Athletic | | |
| Total | | 634 | (198) |

Managerial career
- 2003: Bradford City (joint caretaker)
- 2019: East Hull
- * Club domestic league appearances and goals

Dean Windass (born 1 April 1969) is an English former professional footballer who played as a striker. He played spells at Bradford City and contributed to his hometown team Hull City's promotion to the Premier League in 2008.

Windass started his footballing career as a trainee at his hometown club, Hull City, and signed his first professional contract there. He scored 64 goals in 205 games for Hull, and, when he left, he brought the club a record transfer fee at the time, going on to play in the top divisions in both English and Scottish football. Later in his career, he returned to Hull City, and scored the only goal of the 2008 Football League Championship play-off final to take them to the top flight for the first time in their history.

Windass also had two spells at Bradford City, where he became the club's third-highest scorer of all time. He has also played for Aberdeen, Oxford United, Middlesbrough, Sheffield Wednesday, Sheffield United, and Oldham Athletic. He is seen as a controversial player, once being sent off three times in a game for Aberdeen, as well as grabbing another opponent's testicles in a match at Bradford City.

Windass scored his last Premier League goal at the age of 39, becoming Hull City's oldest-ever scorer. He officially announced his retirement from the game on 19 October 2009, but hoped to carry on with a career in coaching. He briefly worked as player-coach, under former manager Colin Todd at Darlington, but the pair only lasted nine games in charge.

He came out of retirement and played for Barton Town Old Boys before joining Scarborough Athletic on a game-by-game deal. In 2012 he began playing for AFC Walkington in the Premier Division of the East Riding League, where his ex-teammate Leigh Palin is the manager.

In 2025, Windass has been named to receive honorary degree from the University of Hull.

== Personal life ==
Windass was born in Hull, East Riding of Yorkshire, and grew up in the Gipsyville area of the city. His parents, John and Doreen, divorced when he was thirteen years old. He regularly attended Hull City matches at Boothferry Park, and played football, cricket and hockey for his school. Windass credits his wife, Helen, a police officer, also from Hull, with devising his fitness and diet regimes. They met in 1992, married on 31 July 1993, and had two sons, Josh, who also became a professional footballer, and Jordan. After 18 years, his marriage to Helen ended.

Windass completed his UEFA A and B football coaching licences.

He revealed that he had attempted suicide twice in January 2012, having suffered from alcoholism and depression following his retirement from playing. He spent time in rehabilitation for alcohol dependency. In 2016, Windass was "effectively broke" and bankrupt. His finances were adversely affected by a divorce as well as tax debts that had resulted from an unwise film investment scheme that had ensnared many other former players as well.

Windass was diagnosed with Stage 2 (early) dementia, attributed to heading footballs, in 2024. While having no symptoms, he had been persuaded to take a diagnostic scan as a precaution. Afterwards he was active persuading ten to fifteen other former players to be scanned.

== Playing career ==
=== Hull City ===
Windass started his footballing career as a YTS trainee at Hull City in the mid 1980s before being released by manager Brian Horton. He had unsuccessful trials at professional clubs Sunderland, Cambridge United, and York City and instead started playing for non-league North Ferriby United while also having to work on building sites and packing frozen peas. He was brought back to Hull City by manager Terry Dolan in October 1991, entering professional league football at the relatively late age of 22. He initially played in midfield for the Tigers and later as a forward, playing 205 games and scoring 64 goals, becoming a firm fans' favourite – in a 2005 poll to name the top 100 Tigers, Windass was named the fourth best player in the club's 100-year history. In December 1995, with the club in financial difficulty and bottom of Division Two, he was sold to Aberdeen in the Scottish Premier Division for £700,000.

=== Aberdeen ===
During his time at Aberdeen, Windass was a popular player, though he gained a reputation as a player who often got into trouble with the authorities. On 9 November 1997, during a league game with Dundee United, he was involved in a notorious incident when he committed three separate red-card offences in the same match: first being dismissed for two yellow cards, then cited for verbally abusing the referee, and finally for kicking over a corner flag as he left the field. This game was the club's last match under the management of Roy Aitken, and Windass himself was to move on at the end of the season. In the three years, he spent at Aberdeen he scored 21 goals in 72 league appearances, and a total of 31 goals in 92 appearances in all competitions.

=== Oxford United ===
In July 1998, he moved to Oxford United for a club record £475,000. He won a Division One Player of the Month award, and scored 15 goals in 33 league games in his nine months with the club, but was unable to prevent them from relegation to Division Two at the end of the 1998–99 season.

=== Bradford City ===
He transferred to Bradford City in March 1999 for an initial fee of £950,000 as manager Paul Jewell looked to build his squad for a promotion push in the final stages of the season to reach the Premiership. He helped Bradford City to runners-up position in Division One in 1998–99 and thus gain promotion to the top division for the first time in 77 years. Promotion meant his transfer fee rose to £1 million, and he became the club's third seven-figure signing of the season. During the summer, Windass opted not to go on holiday and instead continued to train in preparation for his own first season in the English top flight. His dedication was rewarded as he was the club's top scorer in their first season in the Premiership with ten goals, including a hat-trick in a 4–4 draw with Derby County. City avoided relegation on the final day of the 1999–2000 season, when they defeated Liverpool 1–0 thanks to a header from David Wetherall.

Paul Jewell surprisingly left City in the days following City's successful battle against relegation and his assistant manager Chris Hutchings took over. Hutchings was given money by chairman Geoffrey Richmond to spend on new players, which included new strikers Benito Carbone and Ashley Ward. Windass found himself alternating between midfield and attack in a revamped Bradford squad, but the new signings failed to gel and with the club facing relegation he was sold to Middlesbrough in March 2001 for £600,000. He still finished the season as the club's top scorer - his eight goals included three in the UEFA Intertoto Cup and one in a 2–0 victory over Chelsea, which proved to be the only league victory under Hutchings before he was sacked in November. Stuart McCall took temporary charge before the appointment of Jim Jefferies.

=== Middlesbrough and Sheffield United ===
Windass said the move to Middlesbrough was the highlight of his career, but his debut (on which he scored against Chelsea) was delayed due to a back injury he picked up lifting a bag out of the car, and his league appearances were restricted to just 38 as he failed to become a first-team regular at the Riverside, and instead spent periods on loan at Sheffield Wednesday and rivals Sheffield United, before a permanent move to Sheffield United in January 2003 after an approach from his former teammate Stuart McCall who was assistant at United. Windass helped the Blades to the play-offs but he was dropped by manager Neil Warnock for the final, opting instead to watch his side's 3–0 defeat by Wolves in a pub. He decided not to stay at United and instead returned to Bradford City, now under the management of Nicky Law, in July 2003.

=== Return to Bradford City ===
Windass returned to Bradford City in time for the 2003-04 Division One campaign, was equally as successful on a personal scale and he climbed to the club's third highest scorer in its history.However, this was not a successful period for the club who no longer had the spending power they had enjoyed just a few years earlier, and were relegated at the end of that season. In 2004–05, Windass scored 28 goals to be the top scorer in the Football League although the club could only finish in mid-table. The following season Windass added another 20 goals as Bradford City matched the previous season's 13th place finish.

Windass remained a controversial character and in September 2006, on FIFA Fair Play Day, he was accused of grabbing fellow professional John Finnigan by the testicles during Bradford City's 2–1 win over Cheltenham Town. Finnigan was then sent off for violent conduct after hitting Windass. Earlier that year, he had received a five-game ban for abusing referee Darren Drysdale in the Valley Parade car park after a drawn game against Brentford.

Despite persistent speculation about a return to Hull City, and repeated bids of up to £500,000 from Premiership Wigan Athletic by former Bradford manager Paul Jewell, on 19 October 2006 he signed an extension to his Bradford City contract until 2009, stating an ambition to score the 40 goals he needs to become the club's all-time top scorer by the time his new contract ends.

However, on 17 January 2007, it was confirmed that Windass would return to Hull City on loan until the end of the season. The money Hull paid for the loan deal and the savings Bradford made not having to pay his wages ensured Bradford City chairman Julian Rhodes could pay urgent bills. He was not to return to Bradford City and he finished with 76 league goals and 87 goals in total. The tally puts him behind just Bobby Campbell and Frank O'Rourke in the club's goal scoring charts.

=== Return to Hull City ===
On returning to Hull City after more than a decade away, a now 37-year-old Windass regained the cult status he previously earned at the club, as his eight goals helped to keep the Tigers in the Championship. His most vital strike of this loan spell was on 28 April 2007, the penultimate Saturday of the season, the only goal in the away win over Cardiff City. This left Hull City three points ahead of Leeds United with a vastly superior goal difference, meaning virtually certain Championship survival. However, in his absence Bradford City were relegated from League One to League Two. Windass finished the season as both clubs' top scorer, with 12 goals for Bradford City and eight for Hull City.

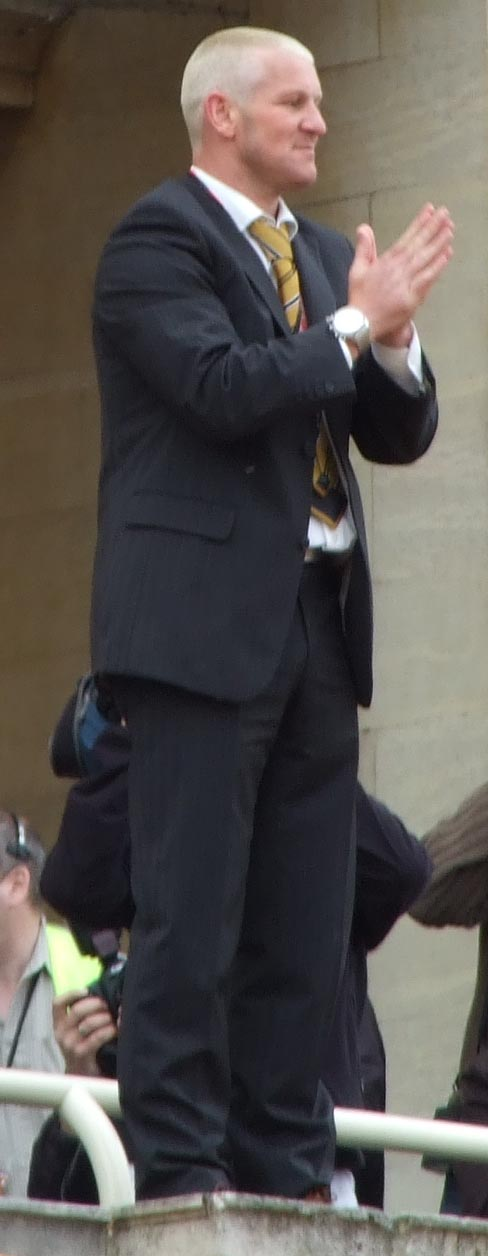
Windass celebrates on the balcony of Hull City Hall after scoring the goal that sent the city's team into the top flight of English football for the first time in its history

At the end of the season, the two clubs entered protracted negotiations over the size of the transfer fee required to make the loan move a permanent one. On 19 June 2007, the transfer was completed, and Windass signed for Hull City on a two-year deal for an initial fee of £150,000, plus further add-ons based on appearances.

In October 2007, Windass' autobiography was published by Great Northern Books, entitled Deano – From Gipsyville to the Premiership, with a foreword from Bryan Robson.

On 22 March 2008, in a match against Leicester City, Windass made his 700th career appearance. On 11 May, he scored his 200th goal in English football, in the Championship play-off semi-final first leg against Watford. His 201st was a volley from the edge of the area in the play-off final at Wembley Stadium on 24 May 2008, giving Hull City a 1–0 win against Bristol City, which meant that Hull City were promoted to the Premier League for the first time in their 104-year history. His goal was estimated to be worth £60 million to the club because of Premier League television rights gained. He had predicted scoring the goal several weeks earlier: "When Phil Brown left me out against Sheffield United this year, I weren't [sic] happy about it. He said to me, 'You will play a major part.' And I said, 'I will score the winning goal to get you in the Premier League.'"

After the game, Windass offered his man-of-the-match award to Hull assistant manager Brian Horton, the manager who had released him from Hull City as a trainee some 20 years earlier, but Horton declined to take it. "Brian said he'd told me to prove him wrong, and he said, 'That goal's enough for me.'"

Hull City Council are considering creating a permanent tribute to Windass, who responded modestly when described as a legend: "Nah, I'm not a legend. I don't like that word. People fight for their country, there are soldiers in Iraq. I'm just a footballer who gets paid a lot of money to do what I enjoy."

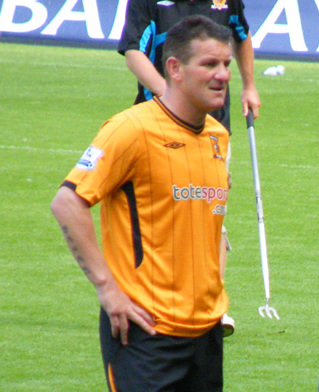
Windass playing for Hull City in 2009

Windass was not selected for Hull's first two games in the Premier League, but after he started and scored in Hull's 2–1 League Cup defeat to Swansea City, he was a second-half substitute in Hull's next league game, as they lost 5–0 to Wigan, for Windass' first Premier League game since leaving Middlesbrough. It was his only action during Hull's start to the season, which saw them take 14 points from their first seven games, leading to Windass being frustrated at his lack of first-team action. After he was left out of the squad to face Everton on 21 September 2008, he held talks with manager Phil Brown, following which he vowed to stay and fight for his place. Because he was out of the side, his former club Bradford City, now in League Two, and League One club Leeds United both made bids to sign Windass.

In the early hours of 12 November, Windass and teammate Marlon King fought in a casino in Scarborough, with King reported to have headbutted Windass. In the following days, the club said the argument had been settled internally and both players allowed to stay with Hull. Windass had to wait till 22 November 2008 to make another Premier League appearance for City, coming on as a substitute against Portsmouth with Hull trailing 2–1. Windass claimed the goal that earned Hull City a draw, with a header from a corner that deflected off defender Noé Pamarot and into the net. This was officially recorded as an own goal at the time, but was later awarded to Windass after a review by the Dubious Goals Committee. In a radio interview after the game, Windass described the casino incident as a "storm in a teacup".

In the following game, Windass was booked for unsportsmanlike conduct without even playing, after he warmed-up too near opposition player Rory Delap while Delap was taking a throw-in. He made his first Premier League start for Hull on 26 December 2008 against Manchester City at the City of Manchester Stadium. Hull lost 5–1, in a game in which they received their half-time team talk from manager Phil Brown on the pitch.

Disappointed by his lack of first team opportunities, Windass was allowed to leave Hull, and, on 9 January, he joined Oldham Athletic on loan for the rest of the season. He was expected to make his debut the following day, but had to wait after Oldham's game with Hartlepool United was postponed and re-arranged for two days later. Windass hit the crossbar before he was substituted in the final minute of the game as his new team won 2–1. Following the sending off of regular goalkeeper Greg Fleming in Oldham's game at Leicester City on 7 February, and with no substitute keeper, Windass went in goal and kept a clean sheet for 40 minutes, with the game ending in a 0–0 draw. His performance in goal led him to being named as Football League One's goalkeeper of the week. On 14 February, Windass scored his first goal for Oldham in a 2–1 victory over Northampton Town—his 200th career league goal, which he celebrated by revealing a T-shirt printed with "200", earning him a yellow card.

After playing just ten times for Oldham, Windass declared on his online blog that he wanted to leave, after a disagreement with manager John Sheridan about his lack of involvement in two consecutive games. However, he later denied that he was going to walk out on Oldham and was a second-half substitute in their 1–0 defeat to Colchester United the following weekend. He eventually returned to Hull on 16 March but was not entitled to play in the Premier League for the rest of the season because of loan rules.

On 26 May 2009, it was revealed in the Daily Record that Windass was interested in the vacant manager's position at Aberdeen.

=== Darlington ===
Windass was reported to be close to being named as player–assistant manager at Darlington to recently-appointed Colin Todd, whom he had previously played under during his second spell at Bradford City. He later declared his interest in signing for Port Vale. He completed his move to Darlington as a player–assistant manager on 17 June. He made his Darlington debut in a 3–1 defeat to Aldershot Town, and a day later he played his Hull City testimonial match against Aberdeen at the KC Stadium. Windass and Todd only lasted nine league games in charge at Darlington, before they left the club by mutual consent on 26 September 2009, having failed to win a single league game. He announced his retirement on 19 October 2009.

=== Barton Town Old Boys ===
In August 2010, Windass came out of his retirement to sign for the North Lincolnshire semi-professional side Barton Town, managed by his former teammate Dave Anderson, on a game-by-game deal. He scored a hat-trick on his debut against Yorkshire Amateur in a 3–1 win for Barton.

=== Scarborough Athletic ===
After leaving Barton Town, Windass signed for Scarborough Athletic, a side where his brother-in-law Darren France is assistant manager, Initially, Sky Sports commitments prevented him from playing for the "Seadogs" and he left, re-signing for the club in October 2011 and making his debut (as a substitute) on 15 October 2011.

== Management career ==
On 21 October 2009, the Grimsby Telegraph reported that Windass had gone on record to state his interest in the vacant manager's post at Grimsby Town, following the dismissal of Mike Newell. He is understood to have applied for the post, stating that his recent retirement as a player was purely coincidental. The local press reported that approximately 25 other applications have been received for the post, including from the club's all-time longest serving player, John McDermott.

In May 2010, he declared his interest in the vacant manager's job at Shrewsbury Town. He was unsuccessful and followed this up by applying for the vacant position at Hartlepool United in August. In May 2012, he applied for the vacant position at hometown club Hull City, stating he would be open to consider also a job as a coaching staff member. In September 2019, he was appointed manager of East Hull.

== Subsequent career ==
On 30 January 2015, it was announced by Hull City that Windass would become the Club Ambassador on 2 February, the club's first official appointment to this role. On 31 December 2020, Windass was inducted into the Hull City Hall of Fame.

== Career statistics ==
Appearances and goals by club, season and competition
| Club | Season | League | | | National Cup | | League Cup | | Other | | Total | |
| Club | Season | Division | Apps | Goals | Apps | Goals | Apps | Goals | Apps | Goals | Apps | Goals |
|---|---|---|---|---|---|---|---|---|---|---|---|---|
| Hull City | 1991–92 | Third Division | 32 | 6 | 0 | 0 | 1 | 0 | 3 (Note: Appearances in Associate Members' Cup) | 2 | 36 | 8 |
| Hull City | 1992–93 | Second Division | 41 | 7 | 2 | 0 | 2 | 0 | 3 (Note: Appearance(s) in Football League Trophy) | 0 | 48 | 7 |
| Hull City | 1993–94 | Second Division | 43 | 23 | 2 | 0 | 2 | 1 | 1 | 0 | 48 | 24 |
| Hull City | 1994–95 | Second Division | 44 | 17 | 1 | 0 | 2 | 0 | 1 | 0 | 48 | 17 |
| Hull City | 1995–96 | Second Division | 16 | 4 | 1 | 0 | 4 | 3 | 3 | 1 | 24 | 8 |
| Hull City | Total | | 176 | 57 | 6 | 0 | 11 | 4 | 11 | 3 | 204 | 64 |
| Aberdeen | 1995–96 | Scottish Premier Division | 20 | 6 | 4 | 3 | — | | — | | 24 | 9 |
| Aberdeen | 1996–97 | Scottish Premier Division | 29 | 10 | 2 | 0 | 3 | 5 | 6 (Note: Appearances in UEFA Cup) | 1 | 40 | 16 |
| Aberdeen | 1997–98 | Scottish Premier Division | 24 | 5 | 1 | 0 | 4 | 1 | — | | 29 | 6 |
| Aberdeen | Total | | 73 | 21 | 7 | 3 | 7 | 6 | 6 | 1 | 93 | 31 |
| Oxford United | 1998–99 | First Division | 33 | 15 | 3 | 3 | 2 | 0 | — | | 38 | 18 |
| Bradford City | 1998–99 | First Division | 12 | 2 | — | | — | | — | | 12 | 2 |
| Bradford City | 1999–2000 | Premier League | 38 | 10 | 1 | 0 | 3 | 0 | — | | 42 | 10 |
| Bradford City | 2000–01 | Premier League | 24 | 3 | 1 | 0 | 3 | 2 | 6 (Note: Appearances in UEFA Intertoto Cup) | 3 | 34 | 8 |
| Bradford City | Total | | 74 | 15 | 2 | 0 | 6 | 2 | 6 | 3 | 88 | 20 |
| Middlesbrough | 2000–01 | Premier League | 8 | 2 | — | | — | | — | | 8 | 2 |
| Middlesbrough | 2001–02 | Premier League | 27 | 1 | 6 | 0 | 1 | 0 | — | | 34 | 1 |
| Middlesbrough | 2002–03 | Premier League | 2 | 0 | 1 | 0 | 1 | 0 | — | | 4 | 0 |
| Middlesbrough | Total | | 37 | 3 | 7 | 0 | 2 | 0 | — | | 46 | 3 |
| Sheffield Wednesday (loan) | 2001–02 | First Division | 2 | 0 | — | | — | | — | | 2 | 0 |
| Sheffield United | 2002–03 | First Division | 20 | 6 | — | | — | | 2 (Note: Appearances in First Division play-offs) | 0 | 22 | 6 |
| Bradford City | 2003–04 | First Division | 36 | 6 | 1 | 0 | 1 | 0 | — | | 38 | 6 |
| Bradford City | 2004–05 | League One | 41 | 27 | 1 | 0 | 1 | 1 | 1 | 0 | 44 | 28 |
| Bradford City | 2005–06 | League One | 40 | 16 | 3 | 1 | 2 | 3 | 0 | 0 | 45 | 20 |
| Bradford City | 2006–07 | League One | 25 | 11 | 2 | 1 | 1 | 0 | 0 | 0 | 28 | 12 |
| Bradford City | Total | | 142 | 60 | 7 | 2 | 5 | 4 | 1 | 0 | 155 | 66 |
| Hull City (loan) | 2006–07 | Championship | 18 | 8 | — | | — | | — | | 18 | 8 |
| Hull City | 2007–08 | Championship | 37 | 11 | 1 | 2 | 1 | 0 | 3 (Note: Appearances in Championship play-offs) | 2 | 42 | 15 |
| Hull City | 2008–09 | Premier League | 5 | 1 | 0 | 0 | 1 | 1 | — | | 6 | 2 |
| Hull City | Total | | 60 | 20 | 1 | 2 | 2 | 1 | 3 | 2 | 66 | 25 |
| Oldham Athletic (loan) | 2008–09 | League One | 11 | 1 | — | | — | | — | | 11 | 1 |
| Darlington | 2009–10 | League Two | 6 | 0 | — | | 1 | 0 | 0 | 0 | 7 | 0 |
| Career total | | | 634 | 198 | 33 | 10 | 36 | 17 | 29 | 9 | 732 | 234 |

== Honours ==
North Ferriby United

- Northern Counties East League Presidents Cup: 1990–91
- East Riding Senior Cup: 1990–91

Bradford City

- Football League First Division runner-up: 1998–99

Hull City

- Football League Championship play-offs: 2008

Individual

- PFA Team of the Year: 1993–94 Second Division
- Football League One Player of the Month: August 2005
