= Chris Lee (footballer) =

English footballer

Personal information
- Full name: Christopher Lee
- Date of birth: 18 June 1971 (age 55)
- Place of birth: Batley, England
- Position: Midfielder

Youth career
- Bradford City

Senior career*
| Years | Team | Apps | (Gls) |
| | Bradford City | 0 | (0) |
| 1990–1991 | Rochdale | 26 | (2) |
| 1991–1993 | Scarborough | 78 | (3) |
| 1993–1996 | Hull City | 116 | (5) |
| 1996 | Rovaniemen Palloseura | | |
- Guiseley
| Total | | 220 | (10) |
- * Club domestic league appearances and goals

Chris Lee (born 18 June 1971) is an English former footballer who played as a midfielder.
