= Andy Mason =

English footballer

Personal information
- Full name: Andrew John Mason
- Date of birth: 22 November 1974 (age 51)
- Place of birth: Bolton, England
- Height: 5 ft 11 in (1.80 m)
- Position: Forward

Senior career*
Years	Team	Apps	(Gls)
1993–1995	Bolton Wanderers	0	(0)
1995–1997	Hull City	26	(4)
1997	Chesterfield	2	(1)
1997–1998	Macclesfield Town	12	(0)
1998	→ Boston United (loan)	7	(4)
1998–1999	Kettering Town	?	(?)
2000–2001	Leigh RMI	9	(1)
2000–2001	→ Leek Town (loan)	?	(?)
2001–2002	Chorley	?	(?)
Total		56	(9)
- * Club domestic league appearances and goals

Andrew John Mason (born 22 November 1974) in Bolton, England, is an English retired professional footballer who played as a forward for various teams in the Football League. His older brother Lee is a retired Premier League referee.

== Honours ==
=== Club ===
Leigh RMI

- Peter Swales Challenge Shield: 1999–2000
