= Mike Quigley (footballer) =

English footballer

Personal information
- Full name: Michael Anthony Joseph Quigley
- Date of birth: 2 October 1970 (age 56)
- Place of birth: Manchester, England
- Position: Midfielder

Senior career*
Years	Team	Apps	(Gls)
1989–1995	Manchester City	12	(0)
1995	→ Wrexham (loan)	4	(0)
1995–1998	Hull City	38	(3)
1998–1999	Altrincham		
1999–2000	Hull City	3	(0)
2000–2001	Northwich Victoria	1	(0)
- Bradford Park Avenue

Managerial career
- 2009–2010: Leigh Genesis (assistant)
- 2010–2015: Chorley (assistant)
- * Club domestic league appearances and goals

Michael Anthony Joseph Quigley (born 2 October 1970) is an English former football midfielder.

After his playing career he was also assistant manager of for Leigh Genesis alongside Gary Flitcroft, appointed on 23 March 2009. The pair later departed from the club, joining local rivals Chorley as the new management team. Whilst at the club he was arrested for a public order offence and was given a fixed penalty notice after an incident at a nightclub.
