= Alan Fettis =

Northern Ireland footballer and coach (born 1971)

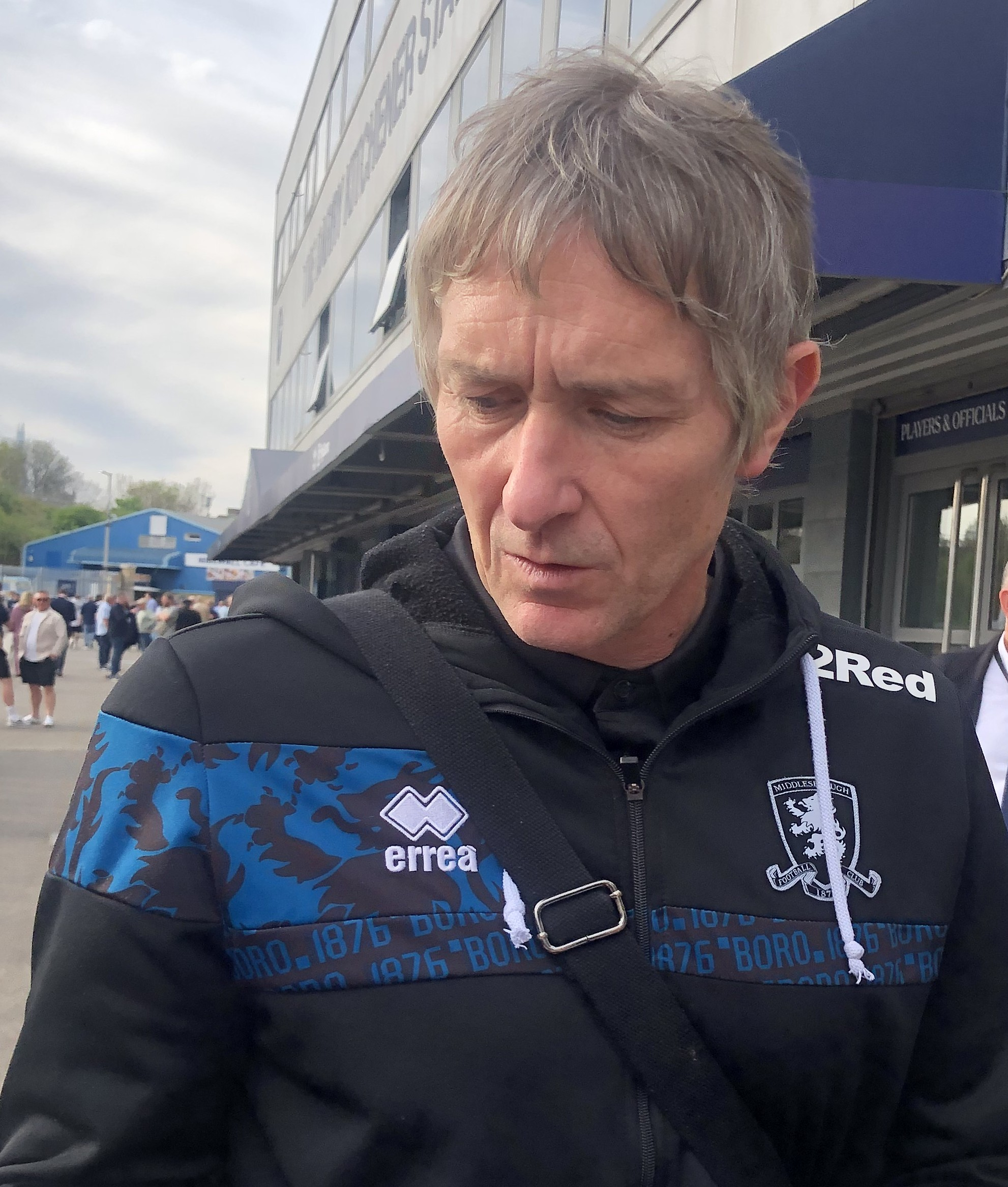
- Alan Fettis in 2025.

Personal information
- Full name: Alan William Fettis
- Date of birth: 1 February 1971 (age 55)
- Place of birth: Newtownabbey, Northern Ireland
- Height: 6 ft 2 in (1.88 m)
- Position: Goalkeeper

Team information
- Current team: Everton (Academy Goalkeeping Coach)

Senior career*
Years	Team	Apps	(Gls)
?–1988	Glentoran	0	(0)
1988–1991	Ards	42	(0)
1991–1996	Hull City	135	(2)
1995	→ West Bromwich Albion (loan)	3	(0)
1996–1997	Nottingham Forest	4	(0)
1997–2000	Blackburn Rovers	11	(0)
1999	→ Leicester City (loan)	0	(0)
2000–2003	York City	125	(0)
2003–2004	Hull City	20	(0)
2003–2004	→ Sheffield United (loan)	3	(0)
2004	→ Grimsby Town (loan)	11	(0)
2004–2006	Macclesfield Town	61	(0)
2006–2007	Bury	9	(0)
Total		424	(2)

International career
	Northern Ireland U16	1	(0)
	Northern Ireland U17	1	(0)
	Northern Ireland U18	1	(0)
1994–1998	Northern Ireland B	3	(0)
1991–1998	Northern Ireland	25	(0)
- * Club domestic league appearances and goals

Alan William Fettis (born 1 February 1971) is a Northern Ireland former professional footballer and goalkeeping coach at Championship side Middlesbrough

As a player, he was as a goalkeeper from 1988 to 2007. He notably played for Hull City and York City having also had spells with Glentoran, Ards, West Bromwich Albion, Nottingham Forest, Blackburn Rovers, Leicester City, Sheffield United, Grimsby Town, Macclesfield Town and Bury.

== Club career ==
Born in Newtownards, County Down, Fettis started his career with Glentoran before playing for Ards from 1988 to 1991, making 65 appearances in all competitions for the club. He was a firm fans' favourite whilst at Hull City, and on occasion found himself playing as a striker due to injuries at the club, and bagged himself a couple of goals in the process. He later rejoined his manager at Hull, Terry Dolan at York City, where his saves were credited by many fans with keeping York in the league during a period in which they struggled financially. He was sold back to Hull by new manager Chris Brass in 2003; York dropped out of the league a year later, returning for the 2012–13 season.

Fettis was signed by Bury on a 12-month deal in June 2006, but broke his right arm in a League Cup defeat against former side Sheffield United on 19 September. He was released by Bury at the end of the 2006–07 season.

== Coaching career ==
Fettis was appointed as assistant goalkeeping coach at Derby County in July 2007.

In November 2008, Fettis became the new goalkeeping coach and chief scout at Cheltenham Town. In July 2009, Fettis became the new goalkeeping coach at Sunderland. He joined Manchester United in January 2011 as a goalkeeping coach for the club's Academy teams. In July 2011, Fettis made an appearance for Manchester United Reserves after both reserve keepers fell ill before a match against Shrewsbury Town.

In August 2016, former Barcelona goalkeeper Víctor Valdés stated that without Fettis' help he would have given up on football in 2015. "It's difficult to explain, but it was hard being alone. The easy way out would have been to end my career." "I want to say in a public way thank you to the U21 coach Alan Fettis – without him I may have given up football. He made me keep going and stopped me when I was thinking about bringing my career to an end." "I feel like a professional goalkeeper again after all those hard days in Manchester," he added. "But I don't have any bad words for Van Gaal or Manchester United".

In 2019, after the sudden departure of Emilio Alvarez from the club, Fettis temporarily stepped up to first team duties to support senior goalkeeping coach Richard Hartis. Fettis returned to his role in the academy after the appointment of Craig Mawson from Burnley.

In July 2022, he joined Middlesbrough as goalkeeping coach under Chris Wilder. He has left Middlesbrough as of September 2025.

In July 2026, he was named the academy goalkeeping coach for Everton.

== International career ==
Fettis was capped by Northern Ireland at schoolboy, under-16, under-17, under-18, B and senior levels.

== Honours ==
Individual

- PFA Team of the Year: 2002–03 Football League Third Division
