= Linton Brown =

English footballer (born 1968)

Personal information
- Full name: Linton James Brown
- Date of birth: 12 April 1968 (age 58)
- Place of birth: Hull, England
- Position: Striker

Team information
- Current team: Cheltenham Town (head of commercial operations)

Senior career*
Years	Team	Apps	(Gls)
1991–1992	Guiseley		
1992–1993	Halifax Town	3	(0)
1993–1996	Hull City	132	(26)
1996–1998	Swansea City	26	(12)
1998	→ Scarborough (loan)	4	(0)
1998–1999	Emley		
1999–2000	Gainsborough Trinity		
Total		165	(38)
- * Club domestic league appearances and goals as of 15:40, 12 July 2010 (UTC)

Linton Brown (born 12 April 1968) is an English former professional footballer who played as a striker.

He scored 27 goals from 155 games in the Football League playing as a forward for Halifax Town, Hull City, Swansea City and Scarborough.

== Playing career ==
Brown played non-League football for Bridlington Town, North Ferriby United, and Guiseley, before making three appearances in the Football League for Halifax Town in 1992 on a non-contract basis.

During the 1992–93 season he joined Hull City where he made his name in football, often a fans favourite. In his first season, he made 21 appearances scoring 3 goals. In the 1993–94 season for Hull City, Brown played 43 games for the club establishing himself as a first team favourite scoring 10 goals. Then backed up the following season with 12 goals for the club. However, in the 1995–96 season Brown scored only one goal and appeared in 26 games, and he was sold by Terry Dolan to Swansea City.

Injury disrupted his Swansea career; he scored three goals in 28 League games, finishing his Football League career on loan at Scarborough, before moving back into non-League football in 1998 with Emley and then Gainsborough Trinity.

== After football ==
After retiring from playing, he worked behind the scenes at his former club Hull, as the commercial manager.

Brown was also the chief executive at Barnsley until January 2017 and in April of the same year was appointed as the head of commercial at Bolton Wanderers.

From 2019 until 2022, he was employed by Blackpool as chief commercial officer.

In May 2024, he was appointed as the Head of commercial operations at EFL League Two side Cheltenham Town.
