= Duane Darby =

English footballer (born 1973)

Personal information
- Date of birth: 17 October 1973 (age 53)
- Place of birth: Birmingham, England
- Height: 5 ft 11 in (1.80 m)
- Position: Forward

Senior career*
Years	Team	Apps	(Gls)
1992–1995	Torquay United	108	(26)
1995–1996	Doncaster Rovers	15	(4)
1996–1998	Hull City	79	(28)
1998–2000	Notts County	28	(5)
1999	→ Hull City (loan)	8	(0)
2000–2003	Rushden & Diamonds	117	(47)
2003–2006	Shrewsbury Town	51	(13)
2006–2007	Nuneaton Borough	27	(9)
2007	Halesowen Town	4	(1)
2007–2008	Bromsgrove Rovers	6	(1)
2008–2009	Stourport Swifts		(1)
2009	Hednesford Town	2	(0)
2009	Evesham United		
2009–2010	Alvechurch		
2010	Redditch United		

Managerial career
- 2007–2008: Bromsgrove Rovers
- 2013: Cradley Town
- 2019–2020: Redditch United
- * Club domestic league appearances and goals

Duane Darby (born 17 October 1973) is an English football manager and former player, who was previously the manager of Southern League Premier Division Central side Redditch United. As a player, he spent most of his career playing as a forward.

Darby has made over 400 senior appearances in English football and scored over 100 goals. He played a significant number of games for Torquay United and Hull City, and also helped both Rushden & Diamonds and Shrewsbury Town gain promotion from the Conference to the Football League.

== Playing career ==
=== Early career ===
Prior to signing for a professional club, Darby played as a youth for Halas Hawks Junior F.C, a junior football club based at Halesowen in the West Midlands. His manager at that time, Graham Barrett, was instrumental in obtaining his position at Torquay. Darby began his career as an apprentice with Torquay United, making his league debut while still a trainee, scoring in a 2–1 defeat at home to Reading having come on as a substitute, and he went on to make a further 13 league appearances that season. He turned professional on 3 July 1992 and went on to score 26 times in 108 league games for the Gulls. On 19 July 1995, he moved to Doncaster Rovers, but stayed less than a year, moving to Hull City on 27 March 1996 for a sum of £25,000. He was a great success with the Tigers, scoring regularly and broke the Hull record for most goals in a competitive game when he scored 6 times against Whitby Town in an FA Cup 1st Round Replay in November 1996.

After scoring 27 times in 78 league games he moved on a 'Bosman' to newly promoted Notts County on 2 July 1998, but missed most of his first season with the Magpies through injury. He returned to Hull City on loan on 25 March 1999. He started the following season for Notts County in top form, but was surprisingly placed on the transfer list in March 2000 and finally left Notts County on 21 June 2000, joining Conference side Rushden & Diamonds for a fee of £100,000.

=== Promotions from the Conference ===
In his first season at Nene Park, he won the Conference Golden Boot award, his goals helping Rushden win the Conference and with it promotion to the Football League. In November 2000 he was charged with assault after an incident in the players tunnel at the end of the local derby against Kettering Town.

In November 2003, Shrewsbury Town, recently relegated to the Football Conference signed Darby in order to bolster their striking force. The signing was well received, with Shrewsbury fans hoping that Darby's experience and proven goalscoring record in the lower leagues would assist them towards promotion, especially when linked with highly regarded striker Luke Rodgers. The strike partnership with Rodgers never quite took off as Darby's time at Shrewsbury was punctuated with injuries, meaning he was unable to get a consistent run in the team. However, Darby's goals in the 2003–04 season were to prove vital as Shrewsbury made the Conference play-off final. In the final, Darby scored an equalising goal against Aldershot Town at Stoke City's Britannia Stadium. With the game finishing level at 1–1, Shrewsbury eventually won the final on penalties.

=== Post-Football League ===
With Shrewsbury back in the Football League, Darby struggled to get into the Shrewsbury side. The arrival of new manager Gary Peters did not help Darby's cause, as Peters aimed to rebuild the squad with younger players. Unable to command a regular first team place, Darby was released by Shrewsbury in February 2006 and joined Nuneaton Borough, also becoming Nuneaton's Football in the Community coach. He scored on his Nuneaton debut, a 2–2 draw at home to Moor Green and was a regular for Nuneaton, but was released in May 2007.

On 3 August 2007, Halesowen Town confirmed that Darby had joined the club along with two other former league players, in the shape of Terry Fleming and Stephen Cooke. After a short spell at The Grove, he moved to local rivals Bromsgrove Rovers, taking over as caretaker player-manager just days after arriving at the club after Rod Brown's departure. He could not keep Rovers in the Southern League Premier Division, and was sacked in August 2008 as they were relegated at the end of the 2007–08 season. He joined Stourbridge Swifts as a player and finished the 2009–09 season with Hednesford Town. After a brief spell with Evesham United, he joined Midland Football Alliance club Alvechurch on 19 October 2009, scoring on his debut. After he left Alvechurch, he joined Redditch United in October 2010.

== Managerial career ==
=== Bromsgrove Rovers ===
Darby's first taste of management came as Darby was installed as manager of Bromsgrove Rovers in January 2007, following the controversial sacking of Rod Brown.

He found himself dismissed on 28 August 2008, following a poor start to the campaign.

=== Cradley Town ===
Darby took the manager position at Cradley Town in January 2013, but moved on to become a coach at Bromsgrove Sporting in May 2013.

=== Redditch United ===
Darby was named as manager of Southern League Premier Division Central side Redditch United on 27 November 2019. In April 2020 it was announced that he had parted company with Redditch United.

== Honours ==
Rushden & Diamonds

- Football League Third Division: 2002–03
