= Neil Allison =

English footballer

Personal information
- Full name: Neil James Allison
- Date of birth: 20 October 1973 (age 53)
- Place of birth: Hull, England
- Position: Central defender

Youth career
- 1990–1992: Hull City

Senior career*
Years	Team	Apps	(Gls)
1991–1996	Hull City	129	(3)
1996	Swindon Town	0	(0)
1996–1997	Sligo Rovers	3	(0)
1997	North Ferriby United	4	(0)
1997	Chesterfield	2	(0)
1997–1999	Geylang United	64	(2)
1999–2005	Gainsborough Trinity	136	(7)
2005–2006	Ossett Town	22	(2)
2006–2007	North Ferriby United	87	(9)
Total		429	(23)

Managerial career
- 2007–2010: North Ferriby United
- * Club domestic league appearances and goals as of 12:53, 12 August 2010 (UTC)

Neil James Allison (born 20 October 1973), is an English football manager and former footballer, who played as a central defender. He notably in the Football League for Hull City and later managed North Ferriby United.

== Career ==
Allison played in the Football League with Hull City, Swindon Town and Chesterfield, in the League of Ireland Premier Division for Sligo Rovers and in Singapore for Geylang United. His final eight seasons were spent with non-league sides Gainsborough Trinity, Ossett Town and North Ferriby United. He managed North Ferriby from 2007 to 2010.
