= Adam Lowthorpe =

English footballer (born 1975)

Personal information
- Date of birth: 7 August 1975 (age 51)
- Place of birth: Hull, England
- Height: 1.70 m (5 ft 7 in)
- Positions: Right-back; defensive midfielder

Youth career
- –1993: Hull City

Senior career*
Years	Team	Apps	(Gls)
1993–1998	Hull City	81	(3)
1998–1999	Gainsborough Trinity		
1999–2004	North Ferriby United		
- * Club domestic league appearances and goals

Adam Lowthorpe (born 7 August 1975) is an English former professional footballer who played for Hull City, Gainsborough Trinity, and North Ferriby United. He briefly represented England internationally at futsal in the early 2000s. Lowthorpe is currently the chief executive of the East Riding County Football Association.

== Career ==
Lowthorpe was born in Kingston upon Hull, and came through the youth ranks of his hometown club, Hull City. After becoming captain of the youth team, he signed his first professional contract in July 1993. Lowthorpe made his debut three months later, on 2 October 1993, in a 3–1 home win over Bradford City. On 12 April 1997, he scored his first goal in a 2–2 draw away to Humber derby rivals Scunthorpe United.

Lowthorpe's only goal at home came on 18 April 1998, in a 3–2 win over Leyton Orient at Boothferry Park. Reflecting in 2014, he said: "I scored at the South Stand end, which was the big terrace where I used to stand as a lad, and that remains a really vivid memory for me". Lowthorpe's contract with the Tigers eventually expired following the conclusion of the 1997–98 season. After a year with non-league Gainsborough Trinity, he spent the remainder of his career at North Ferriby United.

== After football ==
Lowthorpe studied Leisure Management at York St John University towards the end of his playing days, eventually graduating before retiring from football in 2004. During his final years in the game, he also began coaching in Hull's youth setup and their centre of excellence. Following university, Lowthorpe spent a short period at Hull City Council working on cases in a deprived area of the city. In October 2009, he began work as the CEO of the East Riding County Football Association, a position he currently holds.

== Personal life ==
Lowthorpe has been a Hull City supporter since childhood. He has two sons.
