= Paul Fewings =

English footballer

Paul John Fewings (born 18 February 1978) is an English former footballer who played as a striker in the Football League for Hull City. Fewings burst onto the scene as the youngest player ever to sign a three-year contract with the Tigers but his early promise was ravaged by injuries. His displays against Newcastle United and Crystal Palace in the televised FA cup games resulted in his selection for Alan Curbishleys English League squad to face Italy but again, injury prevented Fewings from being called up. After making more than 60 league appearances for Hull he moved to Hereford United where he played as a centre forward finishing as top scorer with a goal scoring ratio of one in every two games for the bulls. He also secured a place in FA Cup folklore with his goal against Martin O'Neills Premier League Leicester City team. That was to be the pinnacle of his career as a reoccurrence of a serious injury eventually meant Fewings' career as a professional would end prematurely at the age of 23. He went on to play for a succession of non league clubs before succumbing to the injury for good, retiring from football aged 26 Farnborough Town on loan, Chesham United, Hendon on loan, Billericay Town, Bishop's Stortford on loan, Chesham United again, Kettering Town, Cambridge City and Bedford Town.
