= Richard Peacock (footballer) =

English footballer

Personal information
- Date of birth: 29 October 1972 (age 53)
- Place of birth: Sheffield, England
- Position: Midfielder

Senior career*
Years	Team	Apps	(Gls)
1992–1993	Sheffield FC		
1993–1999	Hull City	174	(21)
1999–2001	Lincoln City	68	(4)
2001–2002	Stalybridge Celtic	30	(5)
2002	Chester City	7	(0)
2002–2004	Worksop Town		
2004–2005	Buxton		
2005–2006	Lincoln United		
- * Club domestic league appearances and goals as of 20:59, 2 May 2009 (UTC)

Richard Peacock (born 29 October 1972) is an English former professional footballer who played as a midfielder.

He notably played in the Football League for Hull City, Lincoln City and Chester City. He also played Non-League football for Sheffield, Stalybridge Celtic, Worksop Town, Buxton and Lincoln United.

== Career ==
Originally Peacock came from the non league game with his local club Sheffield F.C. Peacock made a step up to the professional game in 1993 where he signed for Hull City. As well as playing for The Tigers, he went on to feature as a professional for Lincoln City in The Football League, before playing in the Conference National for both Stalybridge Celtic and Chester City. He finished the last four years of his career back inside the depths of the non league. Firstly playing in the Northern Premier League with Worksop Town before sliding further down the divisions to feature for both Buxton and Lincoln United.

== Personal life ==
Peacock now lives in Dronfield and has two sons.
