= Rob Dewhurst =

English footballer

Personal information
- Full name: Robert Matthew Dewhurst
- Date of birth: 10 September 1971 (age 55)
- Place of birth: Keighley, England
- Height: 6 ft 3 in (1.91 m)
- Position: Defender

Senior career*
Years	Team	Apps	(Gls)
1990–1993	Blackburn Rovers	13	(0)
1991–1992	→ Darlington (loan)	11	(1)
1992	→ Huddersfield Town (loan)	7	(0)
1993–1999	Hull City	138	(13)
1999–2000	Exeter City	23	(2)
2000	Scunthorpe United	0	(0)
Total		183	(16)
- * Club domestic league appearances and goals

Robert Matthew Dewhurst (born 10 September 1971) is an English former professional footballer who made nearly 200 appearances in the Football League playing as a defender for Blackburn Rovers, Darlington, Huddersfield Town, Hull City, Exeter City and Scunthorpe United.
