= 1999–2000 Hull City A.F.C. season =

English football club season

Hull City
1999–2000 season
- Chairman: Nick Buchanan
- Manager: Warren Joyce (until April); Billy Russell (caretaker); Brian Little (from April)
- Stadium: Boothferry Park
- Third Division: 14th
- FA Cup: Third round
- League Cup: Second round
- Football League Trophy: Quarterfinals
- Top goalscorer: League: John Eyre (8); All: John Eyre (12)
Home colours	Away colours

The 1999–2000 season was the 96th season in the history of Hull City Association Football Club and their fourth consecutive season in the Third Division. In addition to the domestic league, the club would also participate in the FA Cup, the League Cup, and the League Trophy.

== Final league table ==
Pos	Team	Pld	W	D	L	GF	GA	GD	Pts
12	Plymouth Argyle	46	16	18	12	55	51	+4	66
13	Macclesfield Town	46	18	11	17	66	61	+5	65
14	Hull City	46	15	14	17	43	43	0	59
15	Lincoln City	46	15	14	17	67	69	−2	59
16	Southend United	46	15	11	20	53	61	−8	56

Rules for classification: 1) Points; 2) Goal difference; 3) Goals scored

== Results ==
Hull City's score comes first

=== Legend ===
Win	Draw	Loss

=== Football League Division Three ===
Match	Date	Opponent	Venue	Result	Attendance	Scorers
1	7 August 1999	Exeter City	A	0–1	3,834	
2	14 August 1999	Lincoln City	H	1–1	7,046	Greaves 28'
3	21 August 1999	Cheltenham Town	A	0–1	4,427	
4	28 August 1999	Macclesfield Town	H	2–3	6,222	Alcide 13', Brown 64'
5	31 August 1999	Brighton & Hove Albion	A	0–3	5,856	
6	3 September 1999	Chester City	H	2–1	6,167	Eyre 35', 77'
7	11 September 1999	Torquay United	A	1–0	2,446	Eyre 33' (pen)
8	18 September 1999	Swansea City	H	2–0	5,871	Brown 39', Wood 56'
9	25 September 1999	York City	H	1–1	8,293	Eyre 22'
10	2 October 1999	Barnet	A	0–0	3,449	
11	9 October 1999	Hartlepool United	A	0–2	3,114	
12	16 October 1999	Northampton Town	H	0–1	6,467	
13	19 October 1999	Plymouth Argyle	H	0–1	4,727	
14	23 October 1999	York City	A	1–1	5,109	Williams 67'
15	2 November 1999	Rochdale	A	2–0	2,265	Harper 8', Whitmore 90'
16	6 November 1999	Rotherham United	H	0–0	7,045	
17	12 November 1999	Southend United	A	2–1	4,940	Greaves 74', Brabin 82'
18	23 November 1999	Halifax Town	H	0–1	6,067	
19	27 November 1999	Shrewsbury Town	A	0–3	2,577	
20	4 December 1999	Exeter City	H	4–0	5,683	Edwards 22', Harper 45', 75', 89'
21	18 December 1999	Carlisle United	H	2–1	4,727	Wood 75', Eyre 87'
22	26 December 1999	Darlington	A	0–0	7,058	
23	28 December 1999	Mansfield Town	H	2–0	7,215	Greaves 37', Joyce 37'
24	3 January 2000	Leyton Orient	A	0–0	5,169	
25	8 January 2000	Peterborough United	H	2–3	5,898	Brown 43', Eyre 55' (Pen)
26	15 January 2000	Lincoln City	A	1–2	4,687	Brown 83'
27	22 January 2000	Cheltenham Town	H	1–1	4,691	Whitmore 1'
28	29 January 2000	Macclesfield Town	A	2–0	1,900	Eyre 47', 54'
29	5 February 2000	Brighton & Hove Albion	H	2–0	5,167	Harris 66', 82'
30	12 February 2000	Chester City	A	0–0	2,802	
31	19 February 2000	Shrewsbury Town	H	0–0	5,100	
32	22 February 2000	Peterborough United	A	1–2	6,668	Brabin 48'
33	26 February 2000	Swansea City	A	0–0	6,137	
34	4 March 2000	Torquay United	H	0–0	4,668	
35	7 March 2000	Rotherham United	A	0–3	4,881	
36	11 March 2000	Rochdale	H	2–2	4,219	Wood 25', 81'
37	18 March 2000	Halifax Town	A	1–0	2,519	Wood 77'
38	21 March 2000	Southend United	H	0–0	4,150	
39	25 March 2000	Darlington	H	0–1	5,617	
40	1 April 2000	Carlisle United	A	4–0	3,495	Prokas 32' (o.g.), Harris 45', 77', Morgan 80'
41	8 April 2000	Leyton Orient	H	2–0	4,422	Whitney 13', Brown 90'
42	15 April 2000	Mansfield Town	A	1–0	2,213	Brown 83'
43	21 April 2000	Northampton Town	A	0–1	6,758	
44	24 April 2000	Barnet	H	1–3	4,883	Brabin 49'
45	29 April 2000	Plymouth Argyle	A	1–0	4,233	Wood 21'
46	6 May 2000	Hartlepool United	H	0–3	7,620	

=== League Cup ===
Round	Date	Opponent	Venue	Result	Attendance	Scorers
R1 1st Leg	10 August 1999	Rotherham United	A	1–0	3,294	Eyre 18'
R1 2nd Leg	24 August 1999	Rotherham United	H	2–0	4,373	Alcide 10', Brown 73'
R2 1st Leg	14 September 1999	Liverpool	H	1–5	10,034	Brown 58'
R2 2nd Leg	21 September 1999	Liverpool	A	2–4	24,318	Eyre 51', Alcide 56'

=== FA Cup ===
Round	Date	Opponent	Venue	Result	Attendance	Scorers
R1	30 October 1999	Macclesfield Town	A	0–0	2,404	
R1 Replay	9 November 1999	Macclesfield Town	H	4–0	4,844	Eyre 3', 61', Greaves 7', Brown 29'
R2	20 November 1999	Hayes	A	2–2	2,749	Roddins 4' (o.g.), Edwards 56'
R2 Replay	30 November 1999	Hayes	H	3 – 2 AET	7,000	Brown 49', Edwards 97', Wood 112'
R3	11 December 1999	Chelsea	H	1–6	10,279	Brown 38'

=== Football League Trophy ===
Round	Date	Opponent	Venue	Result	Attendance	Scorers
R1	7 December 1999	York City	A	1–0	1,005	Morgan 20'
R2	11 January 1999	Chester City	H	2–0	1,680	Joyce 33', Morgan 76'
Quarter final	25 January 1999	Rochdale	A	0 – 0 (4 – 5 pens)	1,742	

== Squad ==
#	Name	Position	Nationality	Place of birth	Date of birth (age) (Note: Players' ages listed as they were on 1 July 1999, the official start date of the 1999–2000 season)	Previous club	Date signed	Fee
Goalkeepers
1	Lee Bracey	GK	ENG	Barking	11 September 1968 (age 30)	Ipswich Town	July 1999	Unknown
13	Steve Wilson	GK	ENG	Hull	24 April 1974 (age 25)	Academy	4 May 1991	–
25	Matt Baker	GK	ENG	Harrogate	18 December 1979 (age 19)	Academy	July 1998	–
Defenders
2	Neil Mann	DF	SCO	(England) Nottingham	19 November 1972 (age 26)	Grantham Town	July 1993	Free
3	Steve Harper	DF	ENG	Newcastle-under-Lyme	3 February 1969 (age 30)	Mansfield Town	July 1999	Unknown
4	Jason Perry	DF	WAL	Caerphilly	2 April 1970 (age 29)	Lincoln City	December 1998	Unknown
5	Justin Whittle	DF	ENG	Derby	18 March 1971 (age 28)	Stoke City	27 November 1998	£65,000
6	Jon Whitney	DF	ENG	Nantwich	23 December 1970 (age 28)	Lincoln City	December 1998	Unknown
7	Mike Edwards	DF	ENG	Hessle	25 April 1980 (age 19)	Academy	July 1996	–
8	Mark Greaves	DF	ENG	Hull	22 January 1975 (age 24)	Brigg Town	17 June 1996	Unknown
12	Neil Whitworth	DF	ENG	Ince-in-Makerfield	12 April 1972 (age 27)	(Scotland) Kilmarnock	July 1998	Free
17	Steve Swales	DF	ENG	Whitby	26 December 1973 (age 25)	Reading	December 1998	Unknown
23	Steve Morgan	DF	ENG	Oldham	19 September 1968 (age 30)	Burnley	July 1999	Unknown
27	Ian Goodison	DF	JAM	Montego Bay	21 November 1972 (age 26)	(Jamaica) Olympic Gardens	29 October 1999	Free
34	Steve Burton	DF	ENG	Hull	10 October 1982 (age 16)	Academy	July 1999	–
35	Nathan Peat	DF	ENG	Hull	19 September 1982 (age 16)	Academy	July 1999	–
Midfielders
19	John Schofield	MF	ENG	Barnsley	16 May 1965 (age 24)	Mansfield Town	July 1999	Unknown
21	Ben Morley	MF	ENG	Hull	22 December 1980 (age 18)	Academy	8 December 1997	–
22	Gary Brabin	MF	ENG	Liverpool	9 December 1970 (age 19)	Blackpool	January 1999	Unknown
28	Theodore Whitmore	MF	JAM	Montego Bay	5 August 1972 (age 26)	(Jamaica) Seba United	29 October 1999	Free
29	Mike Quigley	MF	ENG	Manchester	2 October 1970 (age 28)	Altrincham	July 1999	Free
30	Jon French	MF	ENG	Bristol	25 September 1976 (age 22)	Bristol Rovers	July 1998	Free
Forwards
9	David Brown	FW	ENG	Bolton	2 October 1978 (age 20)	Manchester United	July 1998	Unknown
10	John Eyre	FW	ENG	Hull	9 October 1974 (age 24)	Scunthorpe United	July 1999	Unknown
16	Jason Harris	FW	ENG	Sutton	24 November 1976 (age 22)	Preston North End	July 1999	Unknown
18	Jamie Wood	FW	CAY	(England) Salford	21 September 1978 (age 20)	Manchester United	July 1999	Unknown
33	Gary Bradshaw	FW	ENG	Beverley	30 December 1982 (age 16)	Academy	March 2000	–

=== Left club during season ===
#	Name	Position	Nationality	Place of birth	Date of birth (age) (Note: Players' ages listed as they were on 1 July 1999, the official start date of the 1999–2000 season)	Subsequent club	Date left	Fee
11	David D'Auria	MF	WAL	Swansea	26 March 1970 (age 29)	Chesterfield	November 1999	£50,000
12	Adam Bolder	MF	ENG	Hull	25 October 1980 (age 18)	Derby County	March 2000	Unknown
14	Warren Joyce	MF	ENG	Oldham	20 January 1965 (age 34)	Retired	April 2000	Retired
15	Gareth Williams	MF	ENG	Newport	12 March 1967 (age 32)	Scarborough	November 1999	Unknown
20	Colin Alcide	FW	ENG	Huddersfield	14 April 1972 (age 27)	York City	November 1999	£90,000
20	Kevin Betsy	FW	SEY	(England) Woking	20 March 1978 (age 21)	Fulham	December 1999	End of loan
24	Gerry Harrison	MF	ENG	Lambeth	15 April 1972 (age 27)	Sunderland	October 1999	End of loan
26	Richard Knight	GK	ENG	Burton upon Trent	3 August 1979 (age 19)	Derby County	October 1999	End of loan
26	Nick Culkin	GK	ENG	York	6 July 1978 (age 20)	Manchester United	January 2000	End of loan
31	Stephen Bywater	GK	ENG	Oldham	7 June 1981 (age 18)	West Ham United	December 1999	End of loan

== Squad statistics ==
Appearances for competitive matches only

Pos.	Name	League		FA Cup		League Cup		Football League Trophy		Total	
Pos.	Name	Apps	Goals	Apps	Goals	Apps	Goals	Apps	Goals	Apps	Goals
FW	(England) Colin Alcide	10(2)	1	0(2)	0	3(1)	2	0	0	13(5)	3
GK	(England) Matt Baker	0(2)	0	0	0	0(1)	0	1	0	1(3)	0
MF	(Seychelles) Kevin Betsy	1(1)	0	0	0	0	0	1	0	2(1)	0
MF	(England) Adam Bolder	18(1)	0	0	0	0	0	2(1)	0	21(1)	0
MF	(England) Gary Brabin	37	3	3	0	4	0	1	0	45	3
GK	(England) Lee Bracey	10	0	3	0	4	0	1	0	18	0
FW	(England) Gary Bradshaw	5(7)	0	0	0	0	0	0	0	5(7)	0
FW	(England) David Brown	39(5)	6	5	3	4	2	2	0	50(5)	11
GK	(England) Stephen Bywater	4	0	0	0	0	0	0	0	4	0
GK	(England) Nick Culkin	4	0	0	0	0	0	0	0	4	0
MF	(Wales) David D'Auria	10(2)	0	3	0	1(2)	0	0	0	14(4)	0
DF	(England) Mike Edwards	36(4)	1	5	2	3	0	1(1)	0	45(5)	3
FW	(England) John Eyre	24	8	2(1)	2	4	2	2	0	32(1)	12
MF	(England) Jon French	0	0	0	0	0	0	0(1)	0	0(1)	0
DF	(Jamaica) Ian Goodison	17(1)	0	3(1)	0	0	0	1	0	0(1)	0
DF	(England) Mark Greaves	38	3	4	1	2	0	2	0	46	4
DF	(England) Steve Harper	36(2)	4	5	0	4	0	2	0	47(2)	4
FW	(England) Jason Harris	18(11)	4	0(1)	0	0(3)	0	1(1)	0	19(16)	4
DF	(England) Gerry Harrison	3	0	0	0	0	0	0	0	3	0
MF	(England) Warren Joyce	19	1	2	0	1	0	2	1	24	2
GK	(England) Richard Knight	1	0	0	0	0	0	0	0	1	0
MF	(England) Neil Mann	2	0	0	0	1	0	0	0	3	0
DF	(England) Steve Morgan	17(2)	1	3(1)	0	1	0	2	2	23(3)	3
DF	(England) Ben Morley	0(1)	0	0	0	0	0	0	0	0(1)	0
MF	(Wales) Jason Perry	1	0	0	0	0	0	1(1)	0	2(1)	0
MF	(England) Mike Quigley	0(3)	0	0	0	0	0	1	0	1(3)	0
MF	(England) John Schofield	13(12)	0	2(2)	0	4	0	1(1)	0	20(15)	0
DF	(England) Steve Swales	17(3)	0	0	0	2(1)	0	1	0	20(4)	0
MF	(Jamaica) Theodore Whitmore	17	2	5	0	0	0	1	0	22	2
DF	(England) Jon Whitney	19(2)	1	2	0	0	0	2	0	23(2)	1
DF	(England) Justin Whittle	38	0	2(2)	0	4	0	2	0	46(2)	0
DF	(England) Neil Whitworth	0(1)	0	0	0	0	0	0	0	0(1)	0
MF	(England) Gareth Williams	12(1)	1	1	0	2	0	1	0	16(1)	1
GK	(England) Steve Wilson	27	0	2	0	0	0	1	0	30	0
FW	(Cayman Islands) Jamie Wood	13(19)	6	3(1)	1	1(2)	0	1(1)	0	18(23)	6
