= 2000–01 Hull City A.F.C. season =

English football club season

Hull City
2000–01 season
- Chairman: Nick Buchanan (until March); Adam Pearson (from March)
- Manager: Brian Little
- Stadium: Boothferry Park
- Third Division: 6th
- FA Cup: First round
- League Cup: First round
- Football League Trophy: First round
- Top goalscorer: League: Rodney Rowe (6); All: John Eyre (7)
- Highest home attendance: 13,310 vs Leyton Orient (13 May 2001, Third Division)
- Lowest home attendance: 2,675 vs Notts County (22 Aug 2000, League Cup)
- Average home league attendance: 6,676
| Home colours | Away colours |

The 2000–01 season was the 97th season in the history of Hull City Association Football Club and their fifth consecutive season in the Third Division. In addition to the domestic league, the club would also participate in the FA Cup, the League Cup, and the League Trophy.

== Final league table ==
| Pos | Team | Pld | W | D | L | GF | GA | GD | Pts | Qualification or relegation |
|---|---|---|---|---|---|---|---|---|---|---|
| 4 | Hartlepool United | 46 | 21 | 14 | 11 | 71 | 54 | +17 | 77 | Qualification for the Third Division play-offs |
| 5 | Leyton Orient | 46 | 20 | 15 | 11 | 59 | 51 | +8 | 75 | Qualification for the Third Division play-offs |
| 6 | Hull City | 46 | 19 | 17 | 10 | 47 | 39 | +8 | 74 | Qualification for the Third Division play-offs |
| 7 | Blackpool (O, P) | 46 | 22 | 6 | 18 | 74 | 58 | +16 | 72 | Qualification for the Third Division play-offs |
| 8 | Rochdale | 46 | 18 | 17 | 11 | 59 | 48 | +11 | 71 | |

Rules for classification: 1) Points; 2) Goal difference; 3) Goals scored
(O) Play-off winners; (P) Promoted

== Results ==
Hull City's score comes first

=== Legend ===
| Win | Draw | Loss |

=== Football League Division Three ===
| Match | Date | Opponent | Venue | Result | Attendance | Scorers |
|---|---|---|---|---|---|---|
| 1 | 12 August 2000 | Blackpool | A | 1–3 | 5,862 | Edwards 34' |
| 2 | 19 August 2000 | Plymouth Argyle | H | 1–1 | 5,431 | Whitmore 16' |
| 3 | 26 August 2000 | Macclesfield Town | A | 0–0 | 1,795 | |
| 4 | 28 August 2000 | Lincoln City | H | 1–1 | 5,780 | Brown 39' |
| 5 | 2 September 2000 | Cheltenham Town | H | 0–2 | 4,750 | |
| 6 | 9 September 2000 | Leyton Orient | A | 2–2 | 5,177 | Whitmore 14', 56' |
| 7 | 12 September 2000 | Mansfield Town | A | 1–1 | 2,629 | Brightwell 64' |
| 8 | 16 September 2000 | Shrewsbury Town | H | 1–0 | 4,775 | Brown 45' |
| 9 | 23 September 2000 | Barnet | A | 1–1 | 2,109 | Marcelle 18' |
| 10 | 30 September 2000 | Cardiff City | H | 2–0 | 5,503 | Gabbidon 11' (o.g.), Greene 69' (o.g.) |
| 11 | 6 October 2000 | Brighton & Hove Albion | H | 0–2 | 6,225 | |
| 12 | 14 October 2000 | Halifax Town | A | 2–0 | 3,003 | Whitmore 22', Marcelle 57' |
| 13 | 17 October 2000 | Exeter City | A | 1–0 | 2,470 | Greaves 85' |
| 14 | 21 October 2000 | Southend United | H | 1–1 | 6,701 | Eyre 11' (pen) |
| 15 | 24 October 2000 | Hartlepool United | H | 0–0 | 5,294 | |
| 16 | 28 October 2000 | York City | A | 0–0 | 5,493 | |
| 17 | 4 November 2000 | Darlington | H | 2–0 | 5,344 | Brabin 36', Whitmore 76' |
| 18 | 11 November 2000 | Chesterfield | A | 0–1 | 5,659 | |
| 19 | 25 November 2000 | Carlisle United | H | 2–1 | 4,677 | Brown 7', Goodison 23' |
| 20 | 2 December 2000 | Scunthorpe United | A | 1–0 | 6,101 | Brightwell 80' |
| 21 | 16 December 2000 | Torquay United | H | 1–2 | 4,708 | Greaves 81' |
| 22 | 23 December 2000 | Kidderminster Harriers | H | 0–0 | 5,470 | |
| 23 | 26 December 2000 | Rochdale | A | 0–1 | 4,327 | |
| 24 | 6 January 2001 | Macclesfield Town | H | 0–0 | 6,217 | |
| 25 | 13 January 2001 | Lincoln City | A | 0–2 | 4,600 | |
| 26 | 16 January 2001 | Blackpool | H | 0–1 | 4,687 | |
| 27 | 27 January 2001 | Kidderminster Harriers | A | 2–2 | 3,029 | Brown 4', Francis 14' |
| 28 | 3 February 2001 | Cheltenham Town | A | 1–0 | 3,360 | Francis 45' |
| 29 | 10 February 2001 | Leyton Orient | H | 1–0 | 8,782 | Rowe 69' |
| 30 | 17 February 2001 | Shrewsbury Town | A | 2–0 | 3,004 | Rowe 8', Francis 37' |
| 31 | 20 February 2001 | Mansfield Town | H | 2–1 | 7,248 | Francis 30', Rowe 68' (pen) |
| 32 | 24 February 2001 | Barnet | H | 2–1 | 7,268 | Eyre 64', 86' |
| 33 | 2 March 2001 | Cardiff City | A | 0–2 | 10,074 | |
| 34 | 6 March 2001 | Halifax Town | H | 1–0 | 6,167 | Philpott 4' |
| 35 | 10 March 2001 | Brighton & Hove Albion | A | 0–3 | 6,823 | |
| 36 | 13 March 2001 | Plymouth Argyle | A | 1–1 | 5,482 | Elliott 84' (o.g.) |
| 37 | 17 March 2001 | Exeter City | H | 2–1 | 7,536 | Burrows 35' (o.g.), Rowe 67' (pen) |
| 38 | 27 March 2001 | Rochdale | H | 3–2 | 7,365 | Brabin 26', Edwards 35', Rowe 69' (pen) |
| 39 | 31 March 2001 | Torquay United | A | 1–1 | 2,779 | Holt 79' |
| 40 | 7 April 2001 | Scunthorpe United | H | 2–1 | 10,881 | Whitney 28', Holt 64' |
| 41 | 14 April 2001 | Hartlepool United | A | 1–0 | 4,364 | Eyre 68' |
| 42 | 16 April 2001 | York City | H | 0–0 | 11,820 | |
| 43 | 21 April 2001 | Darlington | A | 2–0 | 4,998 | Jeannin 8' (o.g.), Eyre 45' |
| 44 | 28 April 2001 | Chesterfield | H | 3–1 | 11,337 | Edwards 5', Francis 22', Rowe 79' (pen) |
| 45 | 1 May 2001 | Southend United | A | 1–1 | 3,573 | Edwards 4' |
| 46 | 5 May 2001 | Carlisle United | A | 0–0 | 8,194 | |

=== Football League Division Three play-offs ===
| Date | Round | Opponents | H / A | Result F – A | Scorers | Attendance |
|---|---|---|---|---|---|---|
| 13 May 2001 | Semi-Final First Leg | Leyton Orient | H | 1–0 | Eyre 69' | 13,310 |
| 16 May 2001 | Semi Final Second Leg | Leyton Orient | A | 0 – 2; 1 – 2 (agg) | | 9,419 |

=== League Cup ===
| Round | Date | Opponent | Venue | Result | Attendance | Scorers |
|---|---|---|---|---|---|---|
| R1 1st Leg | 22 August 2000 | Notts County | H | 1–0 | 2,675 | Eyre 27' |
| R1 2nd Leg | 5 September 2000 | Notts County | A | 0 – 2 (a.e.t.) | 1,907 | |

=== FA Cup ===
| Round | Date | Opponent | Venue | Result | Attendance | Scorers |
|---|---|---|---|---|---|---|
| R1 | 18 November 2000 | Kettering Town | A | 0–0 | 2,831 | |
| R1 Replay | 28 November 2000 | Kettering Town | H | 0–1 | 3,858 | |

=== Football League Trophy ===
| Round | Date | Opponent | Venue | Result | Attendance | Scorers |
|---|---|---|---|---|---|---|
| R1 | 5 December 2000 | Chester City | A | 0–1 | 770 | |

== Squad statistics ==
Appearances for competitive matches only

| Pos. | Name | League | | FA Cup | | League Cup | | Football League Trophy | | Other | | Total | |
| Pos. | Name | Apps | Goals | Apps | Goals | Apps | Goals | Apps | Goals | Apps | Goals | Apps | Goals |
|---|---|---|---|---|---|---|---|---|---|---|---|---|---|
| MF | (England) Mark Atkins | 8 | 0 | 0 | 0 | 0 | 0 | 0 | 0 | 1(1) | 0 | 9(1) | 0 |
| MF | (England) Gary Brabin | 31(6) | 2 | 2 | 0 | 1(1) | 0 | 0 | 0 | 2 | 0 | 36(7) | 2 |
| GK | (England) Lee Bracey | 9(1) | 0 | 0 | 0 | 2 | 0 | 0 | 0 | 0 | 0 | 11(1) | 0 |
| FW | (England) Gary Bradshaw | 0(2) | 0 | 0 | 0 | 0 | 0 | 0 | 0 | 0 | 0 | 0(2) | 0 |
| DF | (England) David Brightwell | 24(3) | 2 | 2 | 0 | 2 | 0 | 1 | 0 | 0 | 0 | 29(3) | 2 |
| FW | (England) David Brown | 24(13) | 4 | 2 | 0 | 1(1) | 0 | 1 | 0 | 0(1) | 0 | 28(15) | 4 |
| MF | (England) Phil Brumwell | 1(3) | 0 | 0 | 0 | 1(1) | 0 | 0 | 0 | 0 | 0 | 2(4) | 0 |
| DF | (England) Mike Edwards | 40(2) | 4 | 1 | 0 | 1 | 0 | 1 | 0 | 2 | 0 | 45(2) | 4 |
| FW | (England) John Eyre | 19(9) | 5 | 2 | 0 | 1 | 1 | 0(1) | 0 | 1(1) | 1 | 23(11) | 7 |
| FW | (Saint Kitts and Nevis) Kevin Francis | 22 | 5 | 0 | 0 | 0 | 0 | 0 | 0 | 2 | 0 | 24 | 5 |
| DF | (Jamaica) Ian Goodison | 36 | 1 | 1 | 0 | 1 | 0 | 1 | 0 | 1 | 0 | 40 | 1 |
| DF | (England) Mark Greaves | 28(2) | 2 | 2 | 0 | 1 | 0 | 1 | 0 | 2 | 0 | 34(2) | 2 |
| DF | (England) Steve Harper | 27 | 0 | 2 | 0 | 1 | 0 | 1 | 0 | 0 | 0 | 31 | 0 |
| FW | (England) Jason Harris | 1(8) | 0 | 0 | 0 | 0 | 0 | 0(1) | 0 | 0 | 0 | 1(9) | 0 |
| DF | (England) Andy Holt | 10 | 2 | 0 | 0 | 0 | 0 | 0 | 0 | 2 | 0 | 12 | 2 |
| DF | (England) Neil Mann | 11(2) | 0 | 0 | 0 | 0 | 0 | 0 | 0 | 0 | 0 | 11(2) | 0 |
| FW | (Trinidad and Tobago) Clint Marcelle | 16(7) | 2 | 1 | 0 | 1 | 0 | 0 | 0 | 0 | 0 | 18(7) | 2 |
| MF | (England) Rob Matthews | 8 | 0 | 0 | 0 | 0 | 0 | 0 | 0 | 2 | 0 | 10 | 0 |
| MF | (England) Ben Morley | 0(2) | 0 | 0 | 0 | 0 | 0 | 0(1) | 0 | 0 | 0 | 0(3) | 0 |
| GK | (England) Paul Musselwhite | 37 | 0 | 2 | 0 | 0 | 0 | 1 | 0 | 2 | 0 | 42 | 0 |
| DF | (Wales) Jason Perry | 6 | 0 | 2 | 0 | 0 | 0 | 0 | 0 | 0 | 0 | 8 | 0 |
| MF | (England) Lee Philpott | 36(6) | 1 | 2 | 0 | 1 | 0 | 0 | 0 | 0(2) | 0 | 39(8) | 1 |
| FW | (England) Rodney Rowe | 14(7) | 6 | 0 | 0 | 0 | 0 | 0 | 0 | 1(1) | 0 | 15(8) | 6 |
| DF | (England) Steve Swales | 20(6) | 0 | 1 | 0 | 2 | 0 | 1 | 0 | 0 | 0 | 24(6) | 0 |
| FW | (England) Gary Fletcher | 1(4) | 0 | 0 | 0 | 0 | 0 | 0 | 0 | 0 | 0 | 1(4) | 0 |
| MF | (Jamaica) Theodore Whitmore | 23(3) | 5 | 0(1) | 0 | 1 | 0 | 1 | 0 | 0 | 0 | 25(4) | 5 |
| DF | (England) Jon Whitney | 14(1) | 1 | 0 | 0 | 2 | 0 | 1 | 0 | 2 | 0 | 19(1) | 1 |
| DF | (England) Justin Whittle | 38 | 0 | 0 | 0 | 2 | 0 | 0 | 0 | 2 | 0 | 42 | 0 |
| FW | (Cayman Islands) Jamie Wood | 2(13) | 0 | 0(1) | 0 | 1(1) | 0 | 1 | 0 | 0 | 0 | 4(15) | 0 |

== Squad ==
| # | Name | Position | Nationality | Place of birth | Date of birth (age) (Note: Players' ages listed as they were on 1 July 2000, the official start date of the 2000–01 season) | Previous club | Date signed | Fee |
Goalkeepers
| 1 | Paul Musselwhite | GK | ENG | Portsmouth | 22 December 1968 (age 31) | Sheffield Wednesday | 19 September 2000 | Free |
| 13 | Steve Wilson | GK | ENG | Hull | 24 April 1974 (age 26) | Academy | 4 May 1991 | – |
| 22 | Lee Bracey | GK | ENG | Barking | 11 September 1968 (age 31) | Ipswich Town | July 1999 | Unknown |
Defenders
| 2 | Neil Mann | DF | SCO | (England) Nottingham | 19 November 1972 (age 27) | Grantham Town | July 1993 | Free |
| 3 | Andy Holt | DF | ENG | Stockport | 21 April 1978 (age 22) | Oldham Athletic | March 2001 | £150,000 |
| 4 | Justin Whittle | DF | ENG | Derby | 18 March 1971 (age 29) | Stoke City | 27 November 1998 | £65,000 |
| 5 | Mike Edwards | DF | ENG | Hessle | 25 April 1980 (age 20) | Academy | July 1996 | – |
| 6 | Mark Greaves | DF | ENG | Hull | 22 January 1975 (age 25) | Brigg Town | 17 June 1996 | Unknown |
| 12 | Ian Goodison | DF | JAM | Montego Bay | 21 November 1972 (age 27) | (Jamaica) Olympic Gardens | 29 October 1999 | Free |
| 15 | Jon Whitney | DF | ENG | Nantwich | 23 December 1970 (age 29) | Lincoln City | December 1998 | Unknown |
| 16 | Steve Swales | DF | ENG | Whitby | 26 December 1973 (age 26) | Reading | December 1998 | Unknown |
| 21 | Jason Perry | DF | WAL | Caerphilly | 2 April 1970 (age 30) | Lincoln City | December 1998 | Unknown |
| 30 | Steve Burton | DF | ENG | Hull | 10 October 1982 (age 17) | Academy | July 1999 | – |
| 31 | Nathan Peat | DF | ENG | Hull | 19 September 1982 (age 17) | Academy | July 1999 | – |
Midfielders
| 8 | Lee Philpott | MF | ENG | Barnet | 21 February 1970 (age 30) | Lincoln City | July 2000 | Free |
| 11 | Theodore Whitmore | MF | JAM | Montego Bay | 5 August 1972 (age 27) | (Jamaica) Seba United | 29 October 1999 | Free |
| 14 | Gary Brabin | MF | ENG | Liverpool | 9 December 1970 (age 20) | Blackpool | January 1999 | Unknown |
| 23 | Ben Morley | MF | ENG | Hull | 22 December 1980 (age 19) | Academy | 8 December 1997 | – |
| 26 | Mark Atkins | MF | ENG | Doncaster | 14 August 1968 (age 31) | Doncaster Rovers | March 2001 | Loan |
Forwards
| 7 | Gary Fletcher | FW | ENG | Widnes | 4 June 1981 (age 19) | Northwich Victoria | March 2001 | Loan |
| 9 | Kevin Francis | FW | SKN | (England) Birmingham | 6 December 1967 (age 32) | Exeter City | December 2000 | Unknown |
| 10 | John Eyre | FW | ENG | Hull | 9 October 1974 (age 25) | Scunthorpe United | July 1999 | Unknown |
| 17 | David Brown | FW | ENG | Bolton | 2 October 1978 (age 21) | Manchester United | July 1998 | Unknown |
| 18 | Jamie Wood | FW | CAY | (England) Salford | 21 September 1978 (age 21) | Manchester United | July 1999 | Unknown |
| 19 | Jason Harris | FW | ENG | Sutton | 24 November 1976 (age 23) | Preston North End | July 1999 | Unknown |
| 20 | Gary Bradshaw | FW | ENG | Beverley | 30 December 1982 (age 17) | Academy | March 2000 | – |
| 24 | Rodney Rowe | FW | ENG | Huddersfield | 30 July 1975 (age 24) | Gillingham | 3 January 2001 | Free |
| 25 | Rob Matthews | FW | ENG | Slough | 14 October 1970 (age 29) | Halifax Town | 21 March 2001 | Free |

=== Left club during season ===
| # | Name | Position | Nationality | Place of birth | Date of birth (age) (Note: Players' ages listed as they were on 1 July 2000, the official start date of the 2000–01 season) | Subsequent club | Date left | Fee |
|---|---|---|---|---|---|---|---|---|
| 3 | Steve Harper | DF | ENG | Newcastle-under-Lyme | 3 February 1969 (age 31) | Darlington | February 2001 | Free |
| 7 | David Brightwell | DF | ENG | Lutterworth | 7 January 1971 (age 29) | Darlington | February 2001 | Free |
| 24 | Phil Brumwell | MF | ENG | Newton Aycliffe | 8 August 1975 (age 24) | Darlington | November 2000 | Unknown |
| 25 | Clint Marcelle | FW | TRI | Port of Spain | 9 November 1968 (age 31) | Darlington | February 2001 | Free |
