= 1998–99 Hull City A.F.C. season =

English football club season

Hull City
1998–99 season
- Chairman: David Lloyd (until November); Tom Belton (from November)
- Manager: Mark Hateley (until 11 November); Warren Joyce (from 21 November)
- Stadium: Boothferry Park
- Third Division: 21st
- FA Cup: Third round
- League Cup: Second round
- Football League Trophy: Second round
- Top goalscorer: League: Brown (11); All: Brown (14)
- Average home league attendance: 6,051
| Home colours | Away colours |

The 1998–99 season was the 95th season in the history of Hull City Association Football Club and their third consecutive season in the Third Division. In addition to the domestic league, the club would also participate in the FA Cup, the League Cup, and the League Trophy.

== Season summary ==
In November 1998 after a poor start to the season, Mark Hateley departed the club and Warren Joyce was asked to stand in as caretaker manager.

Hull soon made the appointment permanent with Joyce taking on the dual role of player-manager. At the time of his appointment, the Tigers were rooted to the foot of the Third Division table and looked to be heading out of the Football League – and into bankruptcy. However, under Joyce's stewardship, Hull staged a remarkable turnaround and achieved survival with games to spare; Hull City fans christened this season "the Great Escape".

== Final league table ==
| Pos | Team | Pld | W | D | L | GF | GA | GD | Pts |
|---|---|---|---|---|---|---|---|---|---|
| 19 | Rochdale | 46 | 13 | 15 | 18 | 42 | 55 | −13 | 54 |
| 20 | Torquay United | 46 | 12 | 17 | 17 | 47 | 58 | −11 | 53 |
| 21 | Hull City | 46 | 14 | 11 | 21 | 44 | 62 | −18 | 53 |
| 22 | Hartlepool United | 46 | 13 | 12 | 21 | 52 | 65 | −13 | 51 |
| 23 | Carlisle United | 46 | 11 | 16 | 19 | 43 | 53 | −10 | 49 |

Rules for classification: 1) Points; 2) Goals scored; 3) Goal difference

== Results ==
Hull City's score comes first

=== Legend ===
| Win | Draw | Loss |

=== Football League Third Division ===
| Date | Opponent | Venue | Result | Attendance | Scorers |
|---|---|---|---|---|---|
| 8 August 1998 | Rotherham United | A | 1–3 | 5,447 | D'Auria |
| 15 August 1998 | Darlington | H | 1–2 | 5,217 | Whitworth |
| 23 August 1998 | Chester City | A | 2–2 | 2,577 | Brown, Hateley (pen) |
| 29 August 1998 | Peterborough United | H | 1–0 | 4,636 | Hateley (pen) |
| 31 August 1998 | Hartlepool United | A | 0–1 | 3,277 | |
| 5 September 1998 | Brentford | H | 2–3 | 4,058 | Hocking, Whitworth |
| 8 September 1998 | Rochdale | H | 2–1 | 3,433 | Peacock, Brown |
| 12 September 1998 | Barnet | A | 1–4 | 2,025 | Peacock |
| 19 September 1998 | Halifax Town | H | 1–2 | 4,719 | McGinty |
| 26 September 1998 | Mansfield Town | A | 0–2 | 2,603 | |
| 3 October 1998 | Cambridge United | H | 0–3 | 3,882 | |
| 9 October 1998 | Cardiff City | H | 1–2 | 8,594 | Brown |
| 17 October 1998 | Scarborough | A | 2–1 | 2,760 | Mann, Hateley |
| 20 October 1998 | Exeter City | A | 0–3 | 2,101 | |
| 24 October 1998 | Southend United | H | 1–1 | 3,551 | McGinty |
| 31 October 1998 | Plymouth Argyle | A | 0–0 | 4,285 | |
| 7 November 1998 | Leyton Orient | H | 0–1 | 5,288 | |
| 10 November 1998 | Brighton & Hove Albion | H | 0–2 | 4,433 | |
| 21 November 1998 | Scunthorpe United | A | 2–3 | 5,633 | Dudley, Brown |
| 28 November 1998 | Carlisle United | H | 1–0 | 4,452 | Dudley |
| 12 December 1998 | Torquay United | A | 0–2 | 2,033 | |
| 19 December 1998 | Swansea City | H | 0–2 | 4,280 | |
| 26 December 1998 | Chester City | H | 1–2 | 6,695 | D'Auria |
| 28 December 1998 | Shrewsbury Town | A | 2–3 | 2,879 | D'Auria (pen), Joyce |
| 9 January 1999 | Rotherham United | H | 1–0 | 5,575 | Bonner |
| 23 January 1999 | Hartlepool United | H | 4–0 | 5,808 | Brown (2), McGinty (2) |
| 26 January 1999 | Peterborough United | A | 1–1 | 4,405 | Whitney |
| 30 January 1999 | Shrewsbury Town | H | 1–1 | 7,331 | Gayle (own goal) |
| 6 February 1999 | Brentford | A | 2–0 | 5,086 | Alcide, Brown |
| 12 February 1999 | Rochdale | A | 0–3 | 5,374 | |
| 16 February 1999 | Darlington | A | 1–0 | 3,107 | Brabin |
| 20 February 1999 | Barnet | H | 1–1 | 6,823 | Whittle |
| 27 February 1999 | Halifax Town | A | 1–0 | 4,455 | Brown |
| 6 March 1999 | Mansfield Town | H | 0–0 | 6,692 | |
| 9 March 1999 | Cambridge United | A | 0–2 | 4,948 | |
| 13 March 1999 | Leyton Orient | A | 2–1 | 5,481 | Brabin, Brown |
| 20 March 1999 | Plymouth Argyle | H | 1–0 | 6,294 | Brabin |
| 26 March 1999 | Southend United | A | 1–0 | 4,149 | D'Auria |
| 3 April 1999 | Scarborough | H | 1–1 | 13,949 | Brabin |
| 5 April 1999 | Cardiff City | A | 1–1 | 8,252 | Alcide |
| 10 April 1999 | Exeter City | H | 2–1 | 5,836 | Williams, Alcide |
| 13 April 1999 | Carlisle United | A | 0–0 | 3,743 | |
| 17 April 1999 | Scunthorpe United | H | 2–3 | 9,835 | Warren Joyce, Brown |
| 24 April 1999 | Brighton & Hove Albion | A | 0–0 | 3,481 | |
| 1 May 1999 | Torquay United | H | 1–0 | 7,789 | Brown |
| 8 May 1999 | Swansea City | A | 0–2 | 9,226 | |

=== FA Cup ===
| Round | Date | Opponent | Venue | Result | Attendance | Goalscorers |
|---|---|---|---|---|---|---|
| R1 | 14 November 1998 | Salisbury City | A | 2–0 | 2,570 | Rioch, McGinty |
| R2 | 5 December 1998 | Luton Town | A | 2–1 | 5,021 | Morley, Dewhurst |
| R3 | 2 January 1999 | Aston Villa | A | 0–3 | 39,217 | |

=== League Cup ===
| Round | Date | Opponent | Venue | Result | Attendance | Goalscorers |
|---|---|---|---|---|---|---|
| R1 1st Leg | 11 August 1998 | Stockport County | A | 2–2 | 3,134 | Brown, McGinty |
| R1 2nd Leg | 18 August 1998 | Stockport County | H | 0–0 (won on away goals) | 3,480 | |
| R2 1st Leg | 15 September 1998 | Bolton Wanderers | A | 1–3 | 7,544 | Brown |
| R2 2nd Leg | 22 September 1998 | Bolton Wanderers | H | 2–3 (lost 3–6 on agg) | 4,226 | Brown, Rioch (pen) |

=== Football League Trophy ===
| Round | Date | Opponent | Venue | Result | Attendance | Goalscorers |
|---|---|---|---|---|---|---|
| R1N | 22 December 1998 | Notts County | A | 1–0 | 1,109 | D'Auria |
| R2N | 5 January 1999 | Wrexham | H | 1–2 | 2,331 | Williams |

== Squad ==
| Name | Position | Nationality | Place of birth | Date of birth (age) (Note: Players' ages listed as they were on 1 July 1998, the official start date of the 1998–99 season) | Previous club | Date signed | Fee |
Goalkeepers
| Matt Baker | GK | ENG | Harrogate | 18 December 1979 (age 18) | Academy | July 1998 | – |
| Andy Oakes | GK | ENG | Northwich | 11 January 1997 (age 21) | Winsford United | December 1998 | Unknown |
| Steve Wilson | GK | ENG | Hull | 24 April 1974 (age 24) | Academy | 4 May 1991 | – |
Defenders
| Rob Dewhurst | DF | ENG | Keighley | 10 September 1971 (age 26) | Blackburn Rovers | 5 November 1993 | Free |
| Mike Edwards | DF | ENG | Hessle | 25 April 1980 (age 18) | Academy | July 1996 | – |
| Kevin Gage | DF | ENG | Chiswick | 21 April 1964 (age 34) | Preston North End | 19 September 1997 | Free |
| Mark Greaves | DF | ENG | Hull | 22 January 1975 (age 23) | Brigg Town | 17 June 1996 | Unknown |
| Matt Hocking | DF | ENG | Boston | 30 January 1978 (age 20) | Sheffield United | September 1997 | Unknown |
| Neil Mann | DF | SCO | (England) Nottingham | 19 November 1972 (age 25) | Grantham Town | July 1993 | Free |
| Jason Perry | DF | WAL | Caerphilly | 2 April 1970 (age 28) | Lincoln City | December 1998 | Unknown |
| Gregor Rioch | DF | ENG | Sutton Coldfield | 24 June 1975 (age 23) | Peterborough United | July 1996 | Unknown |
| Steve Swales | DF | ENG | Whitby | 26 December 1973 (age 24) | Reading | December 1998 | Unknown |
| Jon Whitney | DF | ENG | Nantwich | 23 December 1970 (age 27) | Lincoln City | December 1998 | Unknown |
| Justin Whittle | DF | ENG | Derby | 18 March 1971 (age 27) | Stoke City | 27 November 1998 | £65,000 |
| Neil Whitworth | DF | ENG | Ince-in-Makerfield | 12 April 1972 (age 26) | (Scotland) Kilmarnock | July 1998 | Free |
Midfielders
| Adam Bolder | MF | ENG | Hull | 25 October 1980 (age 17) | Academy | July 1997 | – |
| Gary Brabin | MF | ENG | Liverpool | 9 December 1970 (age 18) | Blackpool | January 1999 | Unknown |
| David D'Auria | MF | WAL | Swansea | 26 March 1970 (age 28) | Scunthorpe United | July 1998 | Free |
| Jon French | MF | ENG | Bristol | 25 September 1976 (age 21) | Bristol Rovers | July 1998 | Free |
| Gerry Harrison | MF | ENG | Lambeth | 15 April 1972 (age 26) | Sunderland | March 1999 | Loan |
| Steven Hawes | MF | ENG | High Wycombe | 17 July 1978 (age 19) | Sheffield United | July 1998 | Unknown |
| Warren Joyce | MF | ENG | Oldham | 20 January 1965 (age 33) | Burnley | July 1996 | Unknown |
| Ben Morley | MF | ENG | Hull | 22 December 1980 (age 17) | Academy | 8 December 1997 | – |
| Gareth Williams | MF | ENG | Newport | 12 March 1967 (age 31) | Scarborough | November 1998 | Unknown |
Forwards
| Colin Alcide | FW | ENG | Huddersfield | 14 April 1972 (age 26) | Lincoln City | February 1999 | £50,000 |
| David Brown | FW | ENG | Bolton | 2 October 1978 (age 19) | Manchester United | July 1998 | Unknown |
| Duane Darby | FW | ENG | Birmingham | 17 October 1973 (age 24) | Notts County | March 1999 | Loan |
| Lee Ellington | FW | ENG | Bradford | 3 July 1980 (age 17) | Academy | December 1996 | – |
| Craig Faulconbridge | FW | ENG | Nuneaton | 20 April 1978 (age 20) | Coventry City | December 1998 | Loan |
| Brian McGinty | FW | SCO | East Kilbride | 10 December 1976 (age 21) | (Scotland) Rangers | November 1997 | Unknown |

=== Left club during season ===
| Name | Position | Nationality | Place of birth | Date of birth (age) (Note: Players' ages listed as they were on 1 July 1998, the official start date of the 1998–99 season) | Subsequent club | Date left | Fee |
|---|---|---|---|---|---|---|---|
| Mark Bonner | MF | ENG | Ormskirk | 7 June 1974 (age 24) | (Wales) Cardiff City | January 1999 | End of loan |
| Craig Dudley | FW | ENG | Newark-on-Trent | 12 September 1979 (age 18) | Notts County | January 1999 | End of loan |
| Paul Gibson | GK | ENG | Sheffield | 1 November 1976 (age 21) | Manchester United | December 1998 | End of loan |
| Mark Hateley | FW | ENG | Derby | 7 November 1961 (age 36) | Released | 11 November 1998 | Released |
| Richard Peacock | MF | ENG | Sheffield | 29 October 1972 (age 25) | Lincoln City | January 1999 | Unknown |
| Andy Saville | FW | ENG | Hull | 12 December 1964 (age 33) | (Wales) Cardiff City | October 1998 | End of loan |
