= 1996–97 Blackpool F.C. season =

English football club season

Blackpool F.C.
1996–97 season
- Owner: Owen Oyston
- Chairman: Vicki Oyston
- Manager: Gary Megson
- Stadium: Bloomfield Road
- Division Two: 7th
- FA Cup: Second round
- League Cup: Second round
- Football League Trophy: Northern quarter finals
- Top goalscorer: League: Tony Ellis (15); All: Tony Ellis (18)

The 1996–97 season was Blackpool F.C.'s 89th season (86th consecutive) in the Football League. They competed in the 24-team Division Two, then the third tier of English league football, finishing seventh. 5 September 1996 marked the 100th anniversary of Blackpool's first match in the Football League.

== Season summary ==
Sam Allardyce was fired after failing to bring the club promotion the previous season. He was replaced by the former Norwich City manager Gary Megson.

Tony Ellis was the club's top scorer for the third consecutive season, with eighteen goals (fifteen in the league and three in the League Cup).

== Final league table ==
Pos	Team	Pld	W	D	L	GF	GA	GD	Pts	Promotion or relegation
5	Bristol City	46	21	10	15	69	51	+18	73	Qualification for the Second Division play-offs
6	Crewe Alexandra (O, P)	46	22	7	17	56	47	+9	73	Qualification for the Second Division play-offs
7	Blackpool	46	18	15	13	60	47	+13	69	
8	Wrexham	46	17	18	11	55	50	+5	69	
9	Burnley	46	19	11	16	71	55	+16	68	

Rules for classification: In the Football League goals scored (GF) takes precedence over goal difference (GD).
(O) Play-off winners; (P) Promoted

== Results ==
Blackpool's score comes first

Legend

Win	Draw	Loss

=== Football League Second Division ===
Date	Opponent	Venue	Result	Attendance	Scorers
17 August 1996	Chesterfield	H	0–1	6,014	
24 August 1996	Bristol City	A	1–0	9,387	Ellis
27 August 1996	Rotherham United	A	2–1	2,914	Philpott, Preece
31 August 1996	Wycombe Wanderers	H	0–0	4,856	
7 September 1996	Walsall	H	2–1	5,176	Philpott, Quinn (pen)
10 September 1996	Burnley	A	0–2	13,599	
14 September 1996	Brentford	A	1–1	5,908	Quinn (pen)
21 September 1996	Shrewsbury Town	H	1–1	4,452	Ellis
28 September 1996	Luton Town	A	0–1	5,303	
1 October 1996	Crewe Alexandra	A	2–3	4,314	Brabin, Quinn
5 October 1996	Bury	A	0–1	5,317	
12 October 1996	Gillingham	H	2–0	4,320	Ellis, Mellon
15 October 1996	Wrexham	H	3–3	4,014	Preece (2), Mellon
19 October 1996	Bristol Rovers	A	0–0	5,823	
26 October 1996	Watford	H	1–1	6,072	Quinn
30 October 1996	Millwall	A	1–2	7,179	Malkin
2 November 1996	Peterborough United	A	0–0	7,011	
9 November 1996	AFC Bournemouth	H	1–1	3,744	Quinn
19 November 1996	Stockport County	A	0–1	4,572	
23 November 1996	Notts County	H	1–0	3,598	Quinn (pen)
30 November 1996	Watford	A	2–2	12,017	Malkin, Brabin
3 December 1996	Plymouth Argyle	H	2–2	2,690	Philpott, Malkin
13 December 1996	Preston North End	A	0–3	14,626	
21 December 1996	York City	H	3–0	3,432	Ellis, Quinn (2, 1 pens)
1 January 1997	Shrewsbury Town	A	3–1	2,787	Preece (2), Mellon
18 January 1997	Crewe Alexandra	H	1–2	4,760	Ellis
25 January 1997	Millwall	H	3–0	4,523	Ellis, Quinn, Darton
1 February 1997	AFC Bournemouth	A	0–0	8,201	
8 February 1997	Peterborough United	H	5–1	4,001	Ellis (3), Preece, Bryan
15 February 1997	Notts County	A	1–1	5,281	Quinn
22 February 1997	Stockport County	H	2–1	5,772	Quinn, Ellis
25 February 1997	Burnley	H	1–3	7,331	Quinn
1 March 1997	Plymouth Argyle	A	1–0	5,585	Ellis
8 March 1997	York City	A	0–1	3,639	
15 March 1997	Preston North End	H	2–1	8,017	Clarkson (2)
18 March 1997	Walsall	A	1–1	3,459	Clarkson
22 March 1997	Bristol City	H	1–0	4,518	Preece
29 March 1997	Chesterfield	A	0–0	4,974	
31 March 1997	Rotherham United	H	4–1	5,524	Linighan, Clarkson, Ellis, Barlow
5 April 1997	Wycombe Wanderers	A	0–1	5,619	
12 April 1997	Bury	H	2–0	6,812	Ellis (2)
15 April 1997	Luton Town	H	0–0	4,382	
19 April 1997	Gillingham	A	3–2	5,151	Quinn, Mellon, Clarkson
22 April 1997	Brentford	H	1–0	4,030	Preece
26 April 1997	Bristol Rovers	H	3–2	6,673	Preece (2), Bonner
3 May 1997	Wrexham	A	1–2	5,664	Ellis

=== FA Cup ===
Round	Date	Opponent	Venue	Result	Attendance	Goalscorers
R1	16 November 1996	Wigan Athletic	H	1–0	5,465	Quinn (pen)
R2	7 December 1996	Hednesford Town	H	0–1	4,583	

=== League Cup ===
Round	Date	Opponent	Venue	Result	Attendance	Goalscorers
R1 1st Leg	20 August 1996	Scunthorpe United	A	1–2	1,880	Quinn
R1 2nd Leg	3 September 1996	Scunthorpe United	H	2–0 (won 3–2 on agg)	2,560	Ellis, Philpott
R2 1st Leg	18 September 1996	Chelsea	H	1–4	9,666	Quinn
R2 2nd Leg	25 September 1996	Chelsea	A	3–1 (lost 4–5 on agg)	11,732	Ellis (2), Quinn

=== Football League Trophy ===
Round	Date	Opponent	Venue	Result	Attendance	Goalscorers
NR1	10 December 1996	Rotherham United	A	1–0 (a.e.t.)	1,143	
NR2	14 January 1997	Lincoln City	H	4–0	1,578	
NQF	4 February 1997	Crewe Alexandra	A	0–1	3,033	

== Squad ==
Note: Flags indicate national team as defined under FIFA eligibility rules; some limited exceptions apply. Players may hold more than one non-FIFA nationality.

No.	Pos.	Nation	Player
—	GK	ENG	Steve Banks
—	GK	ENG	Henry Heighton
—	GK	ENG	Lee Martin
—	GK	ENG	Tony Parks
—	DF	ENG	Craig Allardyce
—	DF	ENG	Andy Barlow
—	DF	ENG	Darren Bradshaw
—	DF	ENG	David Brightwell (on loan from Bradford City)
—	DF	ENG	Marvin Bryan
—	DF	ENG	Tony Butler
—	DF	ENG	Scott Darton
—	DF	ENG	Ben Dixon
—	DF	ENG	Paul Jones (on loan from Tranmere Rovers)
—	DF	ENG	David Linighan
—	DF	ENG	Jason Lydiate

No.	Pos.	Nation	Player
—	MF	ENG	Mark Bonner
—	MF	ENG	Gary Brabin
—	MF	ENG	Paul Carden
—	MF	ENG	Phil Clarkson
—	MF	SCO	Micky Mellon
—	MF	ENG	Udo Onwere
—	MF	ENG	Lee Philpott
—	MF	ENG	Keith Russell
—	MF	IRL	Billy Woods (on loan from Tranmere Rovers)
—	FW	ENG	Tony Ellis
—	FW	ENG	Chris Malkin
—	FW	ENG	Brett Ormerod
—	FW	ENG	Andy Preece
—	FW	NIR	James Quinn
—	FW	ENG	Lee Thorpe
