= 1998–99 Preston North End F.C. season =

English football club season

Preston North End
1998–99 season
- Chairman: Bryan Gray
- Manager: David Moyes
- Stadium: Deepdale
- Second Division: 5th
- FA Cup: Third round
- League Cup: First round
- Football League Trophy: Second round
- Top goalscorer: League: Nogan (18); All: Nogan (21)
- Highest home attendance: 20,857 vs Manchester City
- Lowest home attendance: 8,656 vs York City
- Average home league attendance: 11,926

During the 1998–99 English football season, Preston North End F.C. competed in the Football League Second Division.

== Season summary ==
Preston North End started the season by only losing one of their first 12 fixtures. The defeat in question was against Stoke City. Five games after Christmas the Lillywhites went top of the table. The arrival of Steve Basham, on loan from Bournemouth, gave the side fresh impetus as he scored ten goals in 17 appearances. However, Preston's end to the season saw them win only one of their final nine games and finish in fifth place.

Preston were paired with fourth place Gillingham in the play off semi-final. Despite David Eyres giving Preston the lead in the first leg, the Kent side equalised 11 minutes before time. In the second leg, the Gills opened scoring early which was enough for Preston to miss out on going to Wembley.

In the FA Cup, home victories against Ford United and Walsall gave Preston a third round tie against Arsenal. After an exciting start that saw Preston take a two-goal lead, the Premiership side scored four to knock North End out of the cup.

== Final league table ==
Pos	Team	Pld	W	D	L	GF	GA	GD	Pts	Qualification or relegation
3	Manchester City (O, P)	46	22	16	8	69	33	+36	82	Qualification for the Second Division play-offs
4	Gillingham	46	22	14	10	75	44	+31	80	Qualification for the Second Division play-offs
5	Preston North End	46	22	13	11	78	50	+28	79	Qualification for the Second Division play-offs
6	Wigan Athletic	46	22	10	14	75	48	+27	76	Qualification for the Second Division play-offs
7	Bournemouth	46	21	13	12	63	41	+22	76	

Rules for classification: 1) Points; 2) Goals scored; 3) Goal difference
(O) Play-off winners; (P) Promoted

== Results ==
Preston North End's score comes first

=== Legend ===
Win	Draw	Loss

=== Football League Second Division ===
Date	Opponent	Venue	Result	Attendance	Scorers
8 August 1998	York City	H	3–0	8,656	Appleton, Rankine, Nogan
15 August 1998	Luton Town	A	1–1	5,392	Macken
22 August 1998	Stoke City	H	3–4	11,587	Nogan (2), Eyres
29 August 1998	Lincoln City	A	4-3	4,130	Eyres, Macken (2), Nogan
31 August 1998	Chesterfield	H	2-0	9,249	Harris, Kidd
5 September 1998	Bristol Rovers	A	2-2	6,702	Harris, Jackson
8 September 1998	Wycombe Wanderers	A	1-0	3,800	Nogan
12 September 1998	Reading	H	4-0	9,836	Jackson(2), Eyres(2)
19 September 1998	Oldham Athletic	A	1-0	8,205	Appleton
26 September 1998	Gillingham	H	1-1	10,506	Harris
3 October 1998	Walsall	A	0-1	5,802	
12 October 1998	Manchester City	A	1-0	28,779	Gary Parkinson (pen)
17 October 1998	Colchester United	H	2-0	10,483	Eyres, Nogan
20 October 1998	Macclesfield Town	H	2-2	10,316	Harris, Jackson
24 October 1998	Northampton Town	A	1-1	6,085	Colin Hill(og)
07 November 1998	Burnley	H	4-1	15,888	Rankine, Nogan, Eyres, Byfield
10 November 1998	Millwall	H	0-1	10,228	
21 November 1998	Blackpool	A	0-0	10,868	
28 November 1998	Wigan Athletic	H	2-2	11,562	Macken, Rankine
12 December 1998	Notts County	A	3-2	5,096	Gregan, Cartwright, Harris
19 December 1998	Fulham	H	0-1	12,321	
26 December 1998	Stoke City	A	1-0	23,272	Jackson
28 December 1998	Wrexham	H	3-1	11,562	Nogan, Cartwright(2)
09 January 1999	York City	A	1-0	5,744	Nogan
16 January 1999	Luton Town	H	2-1	11,034	Nogan, Harris
23 January 1999	Chesterfield	A	1-0	6,138	Kidd
26 January 1999	AFC Bournemouth	A	1-3	6,170	Nogan
30 January 1999	Wrexham	A	5-0	6,394	Jackson, Nogan, Macken, Eyres, Kidd
06 February 1999	Bristol Rovers	H	2-2	12,170	Cartwright, Nogan
13 February 1999	Wycombe Wanderers	H	2-1	10,686	Basham (2)
20 February 1999	Reading	A	1-2	10,937	Basham
23 February 1999	Lincoln City	H	5-0	9,849	Basham (2), Nogan (2), Macken
27 February 1999	Oldham Athletic	H	2-1	12,965	Nogan, Jackson
06 March 1999	Gillingham	A	1-1	9,581	Gregan
14 March 1999	Burnley	A	1-0	11,561	Nogan
20 March 1999	AFC Bournemouth	H	0-1	12,882	
27 March 1999	Northampton Town	H	3-0	10,686	Basham (2), Macken
02 April 1999	Colchester United	A	0-1	5,644	
05 April 1999	Manchester City	H	1-1	20,857	Basham
10 April 1999	Macclesfield Town	A	2-3	4,325	Basham (2)
13 April 1999	Wigan Athletic	A	2-2	5,396	Murdock, Eyres
17 April 1999	Blackpool	H	1-2	15,337	Nogan
20 April 1999	Walsall	H	1-0	13,337	Gregan
24 April 1999	Millwall	A	2-2	6,016	Darby, Jackson
01 May 1999	Notts County	H	1-1	11,862	Macken
08 May 1999	Fulham	A	0-3	17,176	

=== Football League Playoffs ===
Date	Opponent	Venue	Result	Attendance	Scorers
16 May 1999	Gillingham	H	1-1	18,584	Eyres
19 May 1999	Gillingham	A	0-1	10,505	

=== FA Cup ===
Round	Date	Opponent	Venue	Result	Attendance	Goalscorers
R1	14 November 1998	Ford United	H	3–0	10,167	Rankine, Harris, Darby
R2	5 December 1998	Walsall	H	2–0	8,488	Nogan, McKenna
R3	4 January 1999	Arsenal	H	2–4	21,099	Nogan

=== League Cup ===
Round	Date	Opponent	Venue	Result	Attendance	Goalscorers
R1 1st Leg	12 August 1998	Grimsby Town	A	0–0	3,008	
R1 2nd Leg	18 August 1999	Grimsby Town	H	0–0 (lost 6–7 on penalties)	5,650	

=== Football League Trophy ===
Round	Date	Opponent	Venue	Result	Attendance	Goalscorers
R1N	8 December 1998	Burnley	A	1–0	3,366	Macken
R2N	19 January 1999	Hartlepool United	A	2–2 (Hartlepool won on penalties)	1,205	Parkinson, Darby

== Staff ==
=== Board ===
Position	Name
Club President	Tom Finney
Chariman	Bryan Gray
Deputy Chairman	Derek Shaw
Vice Chairman	Malcolm Woodhouse
Vice Chairman	Keith Leeming
Chief Executive	Peter Church
Finance Director	Tony Scholes
Non-Executive Director	David Taylor

=== Club Management ===
Position	Name
Club Secretary	Mick Wearmouth
Manager	David Moyes
Youth Development Officer	Geoff McDougle
Youth Coach	Neil McDonald
Centre of Excellence Manager	Gary Peters
Pysiotherapist	Mick Rathbone
Chief Scout	Alan Fogarty
Club Doctor	Dr N S McCraith
Chaplain	Rev. Chris Nelson
Operations Manager	Nigel Webster
Merchandising Director	Steve White
Publications Manager	John Booth

== Statistics ==
=== Goals and Appearances ===
No.	Pos	Nat	Player	Total		Championship		FA Cup		EFL Cup		EFL Trophy	
No.	Pos	Nat	Player	Apps	Goals	Apps	Goals	Apps	Goals	Apps	Goals	Apps	Goals
	DF	(Northern Ireland) NIR	Colin Murdock	38	1	28 + 5	1	2	0	1	0	2	0
	MF	(England) ENG	David Eyres	37	8	33 + 1	8	1	0	2	0	0	0
	GK	(England) ENG	David Lucas	36	0	31	0	3	0	0	0	2	0
	DF	(England) ENG	Dominic Ludden	35	0	26 + 6	0	2	0	1	0	0	0
	DF	(England) ENG	Gary Parkinson	34	2	27	1	3	0	2	0	2	1
	DF	(Scotland) SCO	Graham Alexander	10	0	10	0	0	0	0	0	0	0
	FW	(England) ENG	Jason Harris	39	7	9 + 25	6	2 + 1	1	0	0	2	0
	FW	(Republic of Ireland) IRL	Jon Macken	48	9	30 + 12	8	1 + 1	0	2	0	2	1
	MF	(England) ENG	Julian Darby	23	3	12 + 8	1	0 + 1	1	0	0	2	1
	FW	(Wales) WAL	Kurt Nogan	48	21	39 + 3	18	3	3	2	0	0 + 1	0
	MF	(England) ENG	Lee Cartwright	32	4	14 + 13	4	3	0	0 + 1	0	1	0
	MF	(England) ENG	Mark Rankine	47	4	42	3	3	1	2	0	0	0
	FW	(England) ENG	Mark Wright	3	0	1	0	0 + 1	0	0	0	0 + 1	0
	MF	(England) ENG	Michael Appleton	30	2	13 + 12	2	1 + 1	0	2	0	1	0
	DF	(England) ENG	Michael Jackson	50	8	44	8	2	0	2	0	2	0
	MF	(England) ENG	Paul McKenna	41	1	31+5	0	1 + 1	1	1	0	2	0
	DF	(Northern Ireland) NIR	Paul Morgan	0	0	0	0	0	0	0	0	0	0
	DF	(England) ENG	Ryan Kidd	33	3	27 + 1	3	3	0	1	0	1	0
	DF	(England) ENG	Sean Gregan	47	3	40 + 1	3	3	0	2	0	1	0
	FW	(England) ENG	Steve Basham	17	10	15 + 2	10	0	0	0	0	0	0
	FW	(Northern Ireland) NIR	Stuart King	1	0	0	0	0	0	0	0	0 + 1	0
	GK	(Finland) FIN	Teuvo Moilanen	17	0	15	0	0	0	2	0	0	0
Player(s) who featured whilst on loan but returned to parent club during the season:
	FW	(Scotland) SCO	Andy Gray	5	0	5	0	0	0	0	0	0	0
	DF	(England) ENG	Craig Harrison	7	0	6	0	0	0	0	0	1	0
	FW	(Jamaica) JAM	Darren Byfield	6	1	3 + 2	1	0	0	0	0	1	0
	DF	(England) ENG	Mark Winstanley	0	0	0	0	0	0	0	0	0	0
	FW	(England) ENG	Neil Clement	4	0	4	0	0	0	0	0	0	0
	FW	(England) ENG	Paul McGregor	4	0	1 + 3	0	0	0	0	0	0	0
Out on loan:
	FW	(England) ENG	Michael Holt	4	0	0 + 3	0	0	0	0+1	0	0	0

== Awards and Nominations ==
=== Club Awards ===
Award	Player	Notes	Ref.
Player of the Year	(England) Michael Jackson		
