= Neil Mann =

Neil Mann may refer to:

- Neil Mann (Australian footballer) (1924–2013), Australian rules footballer
- Neil Mann (English footballer) (born 1972), English footballer
