= Mark Greaves =

English footballer (born 1975)

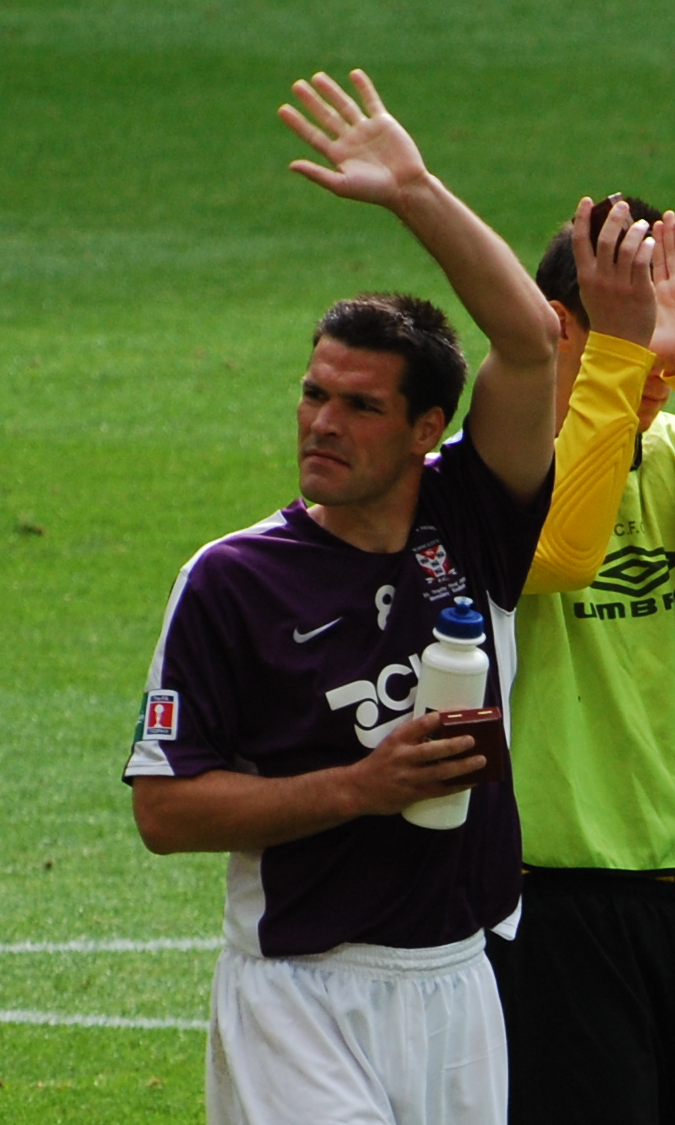
- Greaves after playing for York City in the 2009 FA Trophy Final

Personal information
- Full name: Mark Andrew Greaves
- Date of birth: 22 January 1975 (age 51)
- Place of birth: Kingston upon Hull, England
- Positions: Defender; midfielder

Senior career*
Years	Team	Apps	(Gls)
?–1996	Brigg Town		
1996–2002	Hull City	177	(10)
2002–2007	Boston United	158	(5)
2007–2008	Burton Albion	35	(5)
2008–2009	York City	35	(3)
2009–2011	Gainsborough Trinity	60	(2)
2011	North Ferriby United	10	(0)
2015–2016	Hull United		
Total		475	(25)
- * Club domestic league appearances and goals

Mark Andrew Greaves (born 22 January 1975) is an English former professional footballer who played as a defender.

During his career he played in the Football League for Hull City from 1996 until 2002. He then joined Boston United during their time in professional football. Greaves dropped in to Non-League football when he joined Burton Albion in 2007 and later featured for York City and Gainsborough Trinity before initially retiring with North Ferriby United in 2011. During the 2015–16 season he briefly came out of retirement and played for Hull United.

== Career ==
=== Hull City ===
Born in Kingston upon Hull, Humberside, Greaves started his career at Brigg Town, where he won an FA Vase winners medal before joining hometown club Hull City on 17 June 1996. He was named Hull's Player of the Year in the 1999–2000 season. He spent his whole Hull career playing in the Third Division and made 204 appearances and scored 12 goals in all competitions before being released in 2002.

=== Boston United ===
He was signed by Boston United caretaker manager Neil Thompson in August 2002. He signed a new two-year contract with the club in April 2004 and after this expired he agreed to a one-year deal in May 2006.

=== Burton Albion ===
He made 175 appearances and scored five goals in all competitions for the side before moving to Burton Albion in the Conference Premier in July 2007 after finishing the 2006–07 season as Boston's Player of the Year, which saw the team face two relegations. He made 46 appearances and scored five goals in the 2007–08 season but missed the play-offs due to a broken jaw.

=== York City ===
He was released after a season at Burton and joined fellow Conference Premier side York City on 14 May 2008. He was appointed as club captain for the 2008–09 season. His debut came in a 1–0 victory against Crawley Town and scored the only goal in the subsequent game against Wrexham. Greaves suffered from foodborne illness in September, which resulted in him losing 9 pounds, and missing York's match against Kidderminster Harriers. He scored a 94th-minute equaliser against Mansfield in the Conference League Cup third round on 4 November, which York eventually won 4–2 on a penalty shoot-out following a 1–1 draw after extra time. He started in the 2009 FA Trophy Final at Wembley Stadium on 9 May 2009, which York lost 2–0 to Stevenage Borough. Following the end of the season, during which he made 46 appearances and scored four goals, he entered negotiations with York over a new contract.

=== Gainsborough Trinity ===
Greaves was eventually released by York in June and signed for Conference North team Gainsborough Trinity on 7 July. He made 37 appearances and scored one goal in the 2009–10 season and he signed a new contract with the club in June 2010.

=== North Ferriby United ===
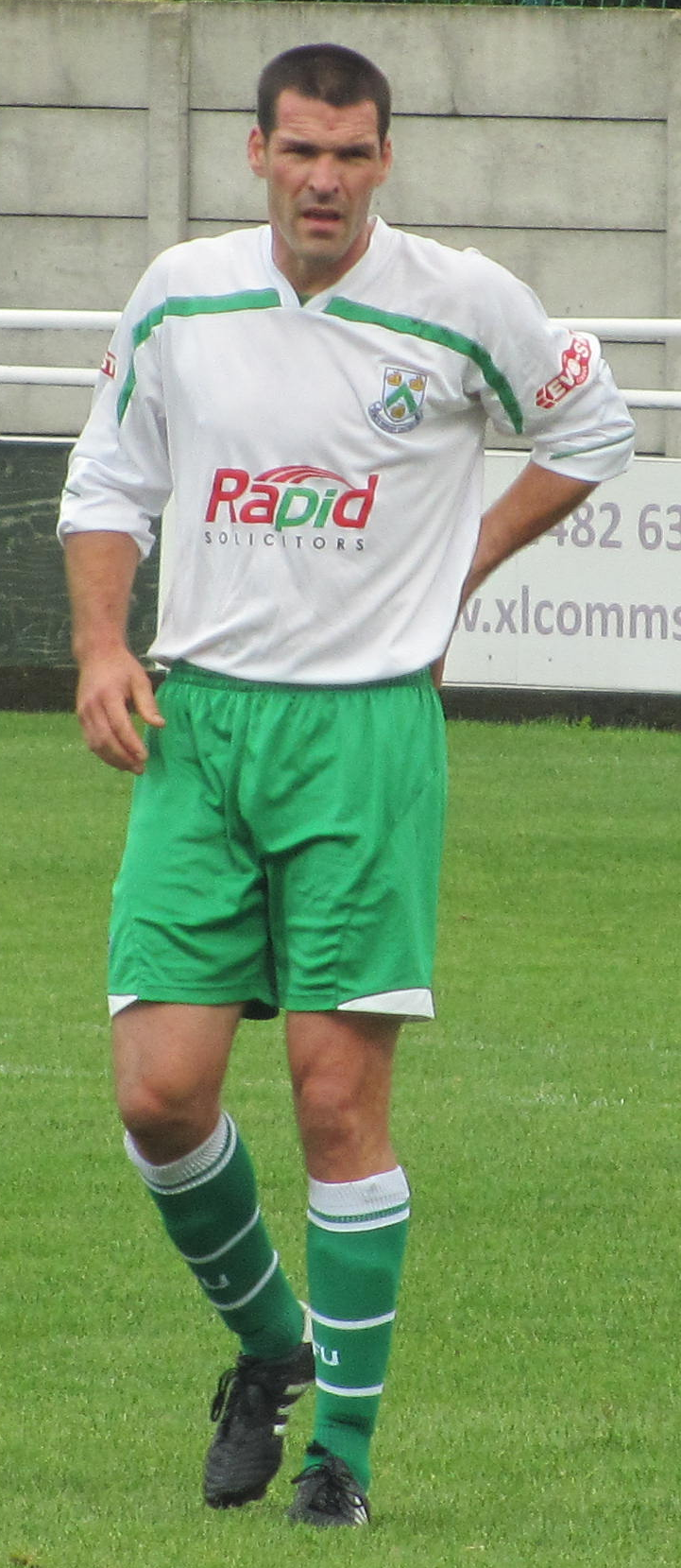
Greaves playing for North Ferriby United in 2011

Greaves was among a number of players released by Gainsborough at the end of the 2010–11 season and on 28 June 2011 he signed for Northern Premier League Premier Division side North Ferriby United. In October, having made 11 appearances in all competitions for North Ferriby, Greaves announced his retirement as a footballer.

=== Hull United ===
On 30 January 2015, he returned to the game, joining Humber Premier League outfit Hull United.

== Personal life ==
Greaves is the father of fellow footballer Jacob Greaves.

== Career statistics ==
Appearances and goals by club, season and competition
Club	Season	League			FA Cup		League Cup		Other		Total	
Club	Season	Division	Apps	Goals	Apps	Goals	Apps	Goals	Apps	Goals	Apps	Goals
Hull City	1996–97	Third Division	30	2	1	0	0	0	1 (Note: Appearance(s) in Associate Members' Cup)	0	32	2
Hull City	1997–98	Third Division	25	2	1	0	2	0	0	0	28	2
Hull City	1998–99	Third Division	25	0	3	0	2	0	1	0	31	0
Hull City	1999–2000	Third Division	38	3	4	1	2	0	2	0	46	4
Hull City	2000–01	Third Division	30	2	2	0	1	0	3 (Note: Appearance(s) in Football League Trophy)	0	36	2
Hull City	2001–02	Third Division	26	1	0	0	1	1	1	0	28	2
Hull City	2002–03	Third Division	3	0	0	0	0	0	0	0	3	0
Hull City	Total		177	10	11	1	8	1	8	0	204	12
Boston United	2002–03	Third Division	26	1	0	0	1	0	2	0	29	1
Boston United	2003–04	Third Division	37	0	1	0	1	0	1	0	40	0
Boston United	2004–05	League Two	22	0	4	0	1	0	0	0	27	0
Boston United	2005–06	League Two	34	1	2	0	0	0	1	0	37	1
Boston United	2006–07	League Two	39	3	1	0	1	0	1	0	42	3
Boston United	Total		158	5	8	0	4	0	5	0	175	5
Burton Albion	2007–08	Conference Premier	35	5	4	0	0	0	7 (Note: Five appearances in FA Trophy, two in Conference League Cup)	0	46	5
York City	2008–09	Conference Premier	35	3	2	0	—		9 (Note: Two appearances, one goal in Conference League Cup; seven appearances in FA Trophy)	1	46	4
Gainsborough Trinity	2009–10	Conference North	31	1	2	0	—		4 (Note: Appearances FA Trophy)	0	37	1
Gainsborough Trinity	2010–11	Conference North	29	1	1	0	—		0	0	30	1
Gainsborough Trinity	Total		60	2	3	0	—		4	0	67	2
North Ferriby United	2011–12	NPL Premier Division	10	0	1	0	—		0	0	11	0
Career total			475	25	29	1	12	1	33	1	549	28

== Honours ==
Brigg Town

- FA Vase: 1995–96

Individual

- Hull City Player of the Year: 1999–2000
- Boton United Player of the Year: 2006–07
