= Nick Culkin =

English footballer (born 1978)

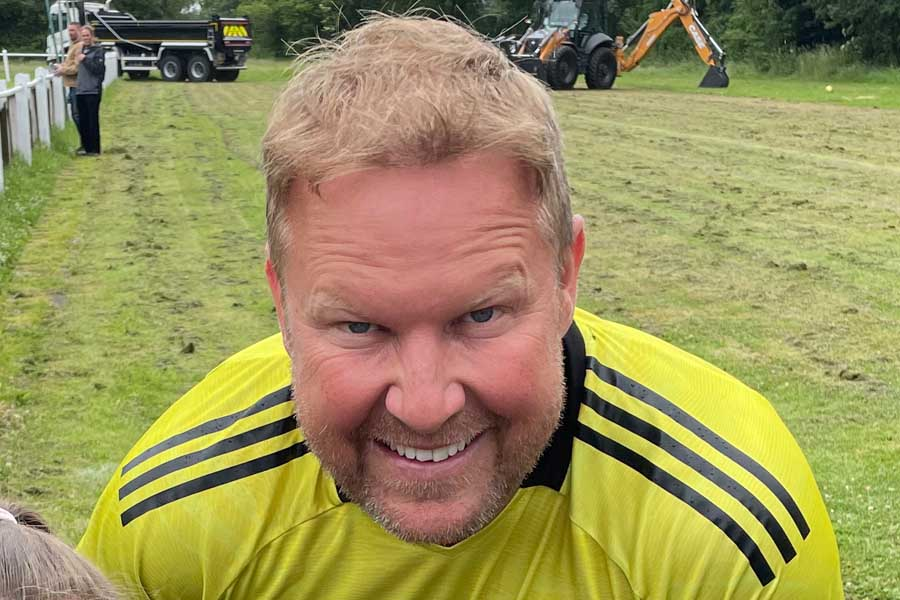
- Culkin in 2022

Personal information
- Full name: Nicholas James Culkin
- Date of birth: 6 July 1978 (age 48)
- Place of birth: York, England
- Height: 1.88 m (6 ft 2 in)
- Position: Goalkeeper

Youth career
- –1995: York City
- 1995–1997: Manchester United

Senior career*
Years	Team	Apps	(Gls)
1997–2002	Manchester United	1	(0)
1999–2000	→ Hull City (loan)	4	(0)
2000–2001	→ Bristol Rovers (loan)	45	(0)
2001–2002	→ Livingston (loan)	21	(0)
2002–2005	Queens Park Rangers	22	(0)
2010–2012	Radcliffe Borough	37	(0)
2012–2014	Prescot Cables		
2014–2018	FC United of Manchester	1	(0)
- * Club domestic league appearances and goals

Nicholas James Culkin (born 6 July 1978) is an English former footballer who played as a goalkeeper.

== Career ==
Born in York, Culkin signed for Premier League club Manchester United in September 1995, costing £100,000 from York City while still in the club's youth system. He made his Manchester United debut on their tour of Scandinavia prior to the 1998–99 season, coming on for Peter Schmeichel at half-time in their game against Norwegian side SK Brann; Culkin kept a clean sheet as United won 4–0. He signed a new two-year contract with United in May 1999.

He holds the record for the shortest debut in Premier League history, replacing Raimond van der Gouw in stoppage time against Arsenal at Highbury on 22 August 1999, the referee blew up right after Culkin took the resulting free kick. Culkin also received two Charity Shield runners-up medals as he appeared on the bench in the 1998 and 1999 Charity Shields.

He was also loaned to Hull City, Bristol Rovers and Livingston. After leaving Manchester United, he signed for QPR. Overall, he played 93 league matches, three FA Cup matches, and seven League Cup matches. Culkin retired from professional football in April 2005 due to a long-standing knee injury.

Culkin came out of retirement after signing for Northern Premier League Division One North team Radcliffe Borough in August 2010. During the 2011–12 season, Culkin was placed in the NPL First Division North team of the Year, and was nominated for the Fans Player of the Year, losing out to Cheyenne Dunkley. He has also been voted the Supporters Player of the year on two occasions and the club's Player of the Year in 2012. He remained at the club until October 2012.

He joined Prescot Cables in November.

In March 2014 he joined FC United of Manchester. He then joined on for the 2014–15 season. This earned him the record of becoming the first player to appear for both Manchester United and FC United.

== Career statistics ==
Appearances and goals by club, season and competition
Club	Season	League			FA Cup		League Cup		Other		Total	
Club	Season	Division	Apps	Goals	Apps	Goals	Apps	Goals	Apps	Goals	Apps	Goals
Manchester United	1999–2000	Premier League	1	0	0	0	0	0	0	0	1	0
Manchester United	2000–01	Premier League	0	0	0	0	0	0	0	0	0	0
Manchester United	2001–02	Premier League	0	0	0	0	0	0	0	0	0	0
Manchester United	Total		1	0	0	0	0	0	0	0	1	0
Hull City (loan)	1999–2000	Third Division	4	0	0	0	0	0	0	0	4	0
Bristol Rovers (loan)	2000–01	Second Division	45	0	1	0	5	0	3 (Note: Appearance(s) in Football League Trophy)	0	54	0
Livingston (loan)	2001–02	Scottish Premier League	21	0	2	0	2	0	0	0	25	0
Queens Park Rangers	2002–03	Second Division	17	0	0	0	0	0	0	0	17	0
Queens Park Rangers	2003–04	Second Division	5	0	0	0	0	0	3	0	8	0
Queens Park Rangers	Total		22	0	0	0	0	0	3	0	25	0
Career total			130	0	5	0	7	0	6	0	148	0
