= Mike Edwards (footballer, born 1980) =

English footballer

Personal information
- Full name: Michael Edwards
- Date of birth: 25 April 1980 (age 46)
- Place of birth: Hessle, England
- Height: 6 ft 0 in (1.83 m)
- Position: Defender

Team information
- Current team: Torquay United (Assistant Manager)

Youth career
- 1995–1997: Hull City

Senior career*
Years	Team	Apps	(Gls)
1997–2003	Hull City	180	(6)
2003	Colchester United	5	(0)
2003–2004	Grimsby Town	33	(1)
2004–2012	Notts County	269	(20)
2012–2014	Carlisle United	24	(0)
2014–2018	Notts County	42	(7)
Total		553	(34)
- * Club domestic league appearances and goals as of 22:42, 26 November 2016 (UTC)

Michael Edwards (born 25 April 1980) is an English football coach and former professional footballer who is assistant manager at Torquay United.

As a player he was a defender. Edwards played professionally between 1997 and 2018 and most notably played for Notts County, where he spent eleven years over two spells which yielded 311 League appearances and 26 goals. He also played for Hull City, Colchester United, Grimsby Town and Carlisle United. In his final season with County, he doubled up his playing duties with being the clubs strength and conditioning coach.

== Playing career ==
=== Hull City ===
Edwards was born in Hessle, Humberside, and began his football career as a trainee with Hull City. Primarily a centre back, he made his debut on 28 December 1997 in the Division Three game away to Rotherham United which Hull lost 5–4, but did not turn professional until the end of the 1997–98 season. By the time he left the club in March 2003, he was their longest-serving player, though still only 22 years old, and had played 208 games in all first-team competitions.

=== Colchester United ===
Edwards joined Colchester United until the end of the season, but was then released, and then after had a trial for Boston United.

=== Grimsby Town ===
Following another trial for Grimsby Town, Edwards signed a one-year deal with Grimsby. He spent the season rotating in the team in the centre half position, partnering Tony Crane, Paul Groves and Simon Ford. Following the club's relegation from the Second Division he was not offered a fresh contract and departed the club in May 2004.

=== Notts County ===
Edwards was signed by Notts County in May 2004 on a free transfer from Grimsby Town by Gary Mills. He played just 10 games until cruciate ligament damage sustained during a League Cup first round tie away against West Ham United ruled him out for the rest of the season. Under new manager Gudjon Thordarson, Edwards made a remarkable comeback to play in all 50 league and cup games in the 2005–06 campaign, demonstrating his versatility by operating in central midfield for most of that season. He slotted back into defence after the departure of Kelvin Wilson towards the end of the season putting in consistent and impressive performances. Edwards scored seven times proving a menace to the opposition at set plays.

Edwards signed a new contract in May 2006 taking him through until May 2008. He won the club's Player of the Season award for 2006–07, and before the following season was made club captain. Only weeks later, in a pre-season fixture against St Blazey, he suffered a badly-broken leg and was out of the side until January 2008. He renewed his contract for a further two years in June 2008. He was a regular in the Notts County starting 11 in 2010–2011 season. He made his 300th appearance for the club in the 2011–12 season in a 0–0 draw against Scunthorpe United.

=== Carlisle United ===
On 11 June 2012, he signed a two-year deal with Carlisle United. Edwards was limited to 24 appearances in two seasons with the club, this eventually led to his release at the end of the 2013–14 season.

In July 2014 he returned to Notts County and played in their pre-season warm up match with Carlton Town, however this was only done as a favour to the player to keep up his fitness levels before the new season.

=== Return to Notts County ===
In August 2014 Edwards signed a contract at Notts County as a Conditioning Coach and player until January 2015. Edwards scored his first goal since re-signing for Notts against Sheffield United in a 1–1 draw on 28 November.

He was released by Notts County at the end of the 2017–18 season and retired shortly after.

== Career statistics ==
As of match played 26 November 2016

Appearances and goals by club, season and competition
Club	Season	League			FA Cup		EFL Cup		Other		Total	
Club	Season	Division	Apps	Goals	Apps	Goals	Apps	Goals	Apps	Goals	Apps	Goals
Hull City	1997–98	Third Division	21	0	0	0	0	0	1 (Note: Appearances in Football League Trophy / EFL Trophy)	0	22	0
Hull City	1998–99	Third Division	30	0	3	0	3	0	2	0	38	0
Hull City	1999–2000	Third Division	40	1	5	2	3	0	2	0	50	3
Hull City	2000–01	Third Division	44	4	1	0	1	0	1	0	47	4
Hull City	2001–02	Third Division	39	1	2	0	2	0	2	0	45	1
Hull City	2002–03	Third Division	6	0	0	0	0	0	0	0	6	0
Hull City	Total		180	6	11	2	9	0	8	0	208	8
Colchester United	2002–03	Second Division	5	0	0	0	0	0	0	0	5	0
Grimsby Town	2003–04	Second Division	33	1	2	0	0	0	1	0	36	1
Notts County	2004–05	League Two	9	0	0	0	2	0	0	0	11	0
Notts County	2005–06	League Two	46	7	2	0	1	0	1	0	50	7
Notts County	2006–07	League Two	45	3	1	0	4	1	0	0	50	4
Notts County	2007–08	League Two	19	1	0	0	0	0	0	0	19	1
Notts County	2008–09	League Two	43	2	3	0	2	0	1	0	49	2
Notts County	2009–10	League Two	40	5	4	0	1	0	1	0	46	5
Notts County	2010–11	League One	37	1	5	0	2	0	1	0	45	1
Notts County	2011–12	League One	30	1	2	0	1	1	1	0	34	2
Notts County	Total		269	20	17	0	13	2	5	0	304	22
Carlisle United	2012–13	League One	23	0	2	0	2	0	1	0	28	0
Carlisle United	2013–14	League One	1	0	0	0	0	0	0	0	1	0
Carlisle United	Total		24	0	2	0	2	0	1	0	29	0
Notts County	2014–15	League One	18	3	1	0	0	0	2	0	21	3
Notts County	2015–16	League Two	22	4	1	0	0	0	2	1	25	5
Notts County	2016–17	League Two	2	0	0	0	0	0	0	0	2	0
Notts County	2017–18	League Two	0	0	0	0	0	0	0	0	0	0
Notts County	Total		42	7	2	0	0	0	4	1	48	8
Career total			553	34	34	2	24	2	19	1	630	39

== Honours ==
Notts County

- Football League Two: 2009–10
