= Gary Brabin =

English football player and manager (born 1970)

Personal information
- Full name: Gary Brabin
- Date of birth: 9 December 1970 (age 55)
- Place of birth: Liverpool, England
- Height: 5 ft 11 in (1.80 m)
- Positions: Midfielder; centre back

Team information
- Current team: Oldham Athletic (assistant manager)

Youth career
- 1987–1989: Stockport County

Senior career*
Years	Team	Apps	(Gls)
1989–1991	Stockport County	2	(0)
1991	→ Gateshead (loan)		
1991	Gateshead		
1991–1994	Runcorn		
1994–1996	Doncaster Rovers	59	(11)
1996	Bury	5	(0)
1996–1999	Blackpool	63	(5)
1998–1999	→ Lincoln City (loan)	4	(0)
1999–2001	Hull City	95	(9)
2001	Boston United	1	(0)
2001–2002	Torquay United	6	(0)
2002	Chester City	16	(3)
2002–2004	Total Network Solutions	48	(7)
2005–2006	Halifax Town	4	(1)
2006	Southport	14	(0)
2006–2007	Burscough	12	(3)
2007–2008	The New Saints	2	(0)
Total		331	(39)

International career
1994	England C	3	(0)

Managerial career
- 2008: Southport
- 2008–2009: Cambridge United
- 2011–2012: Luton Town
- 2014–2015: Southport
- 2015–2016: Tranmere Rovers
- * Club domestic league appearances and goals

Gary Brabin (born 9 December 1970) is an English former professional footballer, coach and manager who is the assistant manager at EFL League Two club Oldham Athletic and the sporting director at Cymru Premier club The New Saints.

A midfielder with a 12-year career in the English Football League, he represented Stockport County, Doncaster Rovers, Bury, Blackpool, Lincoln City, Hull City and Torquay United. He also played non-League football for Gateshead, Runcorn, Boston United, Chester City, Halifax Town, Southport and Burscough, and also played in the Welsh Premier League for Total Network Solutions / The New Saints. He was named Chester City's Player of the Year in 2001–02, winning three caps for the England C team.

He later went into coaching, firstly with Burscough and The New Saints, before he was appointed manager at Southport in April 2008. Two months later, he went on to be named as Cambridge United manager, and despite being named as Conference Premier Manager of the Year for 2008–09, was sacked in July 2009. He later scouted for and coached at Luton Town before he was promoted to first-team manager in March 2011. He led the club to the Conference play-off final two months later, which ended in defeat, and he was sacked in March 2012. He returned to Southport as manager in October 2014 before again leaving the club three months later to work as a coach at Everton. He was appointed manager at Tranmere Rovers in May 2015 before being sacked in September 2016. He joined Port Vale as a coach in October 2017 and was appointed assistant manager at Blackpool 11 months later. In June 2019, he returned to Luton Town as the club's assistant manager for the 2019–20 season. He went on to work in the backroom staff at The New Saints and Oldham Athletic.

== Playing career ==
=== Early career ===
Brabin began his senior career with Fourth Division side Stockport County, making three appearances under Danny Bergara during the 1989–90 season. He played just one further match at Edgeley Park in the 1990–91 campaign before leaving the "Hatters" and dropping into the Northern Premier League with Tony Lee's Gateshead following a successful loan period at the Gateshead International Stadium. He then left the "Tynesiders" and joined Conference club Runcorn, who struggled in the 1991–92 and 1992–93 seasons, before he helped the "Linnets" to a fifth-place finish in 1993–94. He also made two appearances at Wembley Stadium in the 1993 and 1994 FA Trophy finals as Runcorn lost out 4–1 to Wycombe Wanderers and then 2–1 to Woking. He worked as a bouncer during his time at Runcorn.

=== Doncaster Rovers and Bury ===
Brabin departed Canal Street and made a return to the Football League after being signed by Doncaster Rovers manager Sammy Chung for a £45,000 fee in July 1994. He also played three games for the England C team against Wales, Finland and Norway. He went on to score eight goals from 33 appearances for "Donny" throughout the 1994–95 season. Brabin was sent off three times in the second half of the campaign, having already been dismissed against Rochdale earlier in the season. The suspensions caused him to miss a significant number of matches. He curbed his disciplinary problems and added three goals from 34 games in the 1995–96 campaign before he left Belle Vue and was moved on to Stan Ternent's Bury for a £125,000 fee in March 1996. He featured just five times for the "Shakers" during his time at Gigg Lane.

=== Blackpool ===
Brabin joined Blackpool for the 1996–97 season for a £200,000 fee, and scored two goals from 38 matches as manager Gary Megson led the "Tangerines" to a seventh-place finish in the Second Division. He also enjoyed a brief spell on loan at Lincoln City, featuring in five games for John Reames's "Imps" in a brief stay at Sincil Bank. However, he was arrested in September 1996 after an alleged assault on Brentford captain Jamie Bates. An FA disciplinary committee later found him guilty of 'ungentlemanly and improper behaviour'. It fined him £500 and banned him for two matches to run consecutively, with a three-match ban he picked up for accumulating 21 disciplinary points. He scored a further three goals from 29 appearances during the 1997–98 season, as player-manager Nigel Worthington led the "Seasiders" to a 12th-place finish. He played ten games at the start of the 1998–99 season before leaving Bloomfield Road to join Hull City at the bottom of the Third Division in January 1999.

=== Hull City ===
Player-manager Warren Joyce organised a turnaround in the "Tigers" form, as the club salvaged their Football League status with a 21st-place finish at the end of the 1998–99 season, with Brabin contributing four goals from his 23 appearances. Brabin managed to tone down his aggression whilst maintaining a tough tackling and intimidating style of play, helping Hull to greatly improve after being six points adrift at the bottom fo the table when he arrived. By February, Brabin had established himself in midfield and scored the winner against Darlington. His influence grew further in March, when he scored three times in four games, contributing to consecutive victories over Leyton Orient and Plymouth Argyle before finding the net in a 1–1 draw with fellow strugglers Scarborough in front of 14,000 spectators at Boothferry Park. His goals helped Hull climb out of the relegation zone, and they ultimately survived by five points as Scarborough were relegated from the Football League.

Hull then posted a 14th-place finish in the 1999–2000 campaign, with Brabin scoring three goals in his 45 appearances despite struggling with a neck injury. Brian Little then took charge as manager and led Hull to the play-offs at the end of the 2000–01 season, with Brabin again a key first-team player having made 43 appearances and contributed two goals. However, they were beaten by Leyton Orient in the play-off semi-finals, and Brabin departed the club after accepting a severance payment for the remaining year of his contract in August 2001. During the 2000–01 season, amid financial difficulties at Hull that included players going unpaid and disputes over access to Boothferry Park, Brabin became the players' spokesman.

=== Later career ===
After leaving Hull, Brabin trained with St. Johnstone and had trials at Plymouth Argyle, Torquay United, Dundee and Dundee United. He went on to return to the Conference for the 2001–02 season, though played just once for Steve Evans's Boston United after joining on non-contract terms, playing the first hour of a 4–1 win over Hayes at York Street. He left the "Pilgrims" to make a return to the Third Division with Torquay United. He played seven games for Roy McFarland's "Gulls" before he had his contract at Plainmoor cancelled after failing to settle on the coast; he had been sent off against former club Hull City in his second appearance and sent off again in a 2–0 defeat to local rivals Exeter City after elbowing Martin Barlow in the face. He returned to the Conference to score three goals in 17 appearances for Chester City. Despite joining the "Seals" relatively late on in the campaign, he was named Chester City's Player of the Season as he helped the "Blues" to avoid relegation.

Brabin left the Deva Stadium and then signed with Total Network Solutions, and scored six goals in 30 Welsh Premier League matches in the 2002–03 campaign, as TNS finished as runners-up to Barry Town. Ken McKenna's Saints again finished second in 2003–04, this time behind Rhyl, as Brabin scored just once from his 18 appearances. He retired on medical advice in February 2004 after suffering from breathlessness. He then went on to serve Witton Albion as assistant manager. After being advised to stop playing because of a chest condition in 2004, Brabin returned to playing the following year, playing in the Conference National to feature in four games for Chris Wilder's Halifax Town during the 2005–06 campaign, scoring one goal for the "Shaymen". Later in the season, he left The Shay and spent two weeks with Lancaster City in early 2006. He then signed for Southport, and played 14 Conference matches. In November 2006, he signed for Northern Premier League side Burscough, where he assisted with coaching in addition to his playing duties. In June 2007, Brabin was appointed as assistant manager of The New Saints and also played two games at Park Hall in the 2007–08 season.

== Style of play ==
Brabin was a midfielder, but could also play at centre back due to his heading ability. He had a poor disciplinary record.

== Coaching career ==
=== Southport ===
On 8 April 2008, Brabin was appointed manager of Southport on a contract running until the end of the 2007–08 season, replacing Peter Davenport. He guided the "Sandgrounders" into the Conference North play-offs, where they were beaten by Stalybridge Celtic in the penalty shoot-out after a 2–2 aggregate draw over the two legs of the semi-final.

=== Cambridge United ===
On 23 June 2008, Brabin was named as manager of Cambridge United on a two-year contract, taking over from Jimmy Quinn. He led the "U's" to runners-up spot in the Conference at the end of the 2008–09 season, finishing just two points behind Burton Albion. United defeated Stevenage Borough in the play-off semi-finals but were beaten 2–0 by Torquay United in the play-off final at Wembley Stadium. The following month he was named as the Conference Premier Manager of the Year. However, he was sacked from his post at the Abbey Stadium on 13 July 2009 following a series of disputes with the club's board.

=== Luton Town ===
Brabin was appointed as chief scout at Luton Town in October 2009. In May 2010, he was named as Luton's assistant manager, taking over from Alan Neilson.

He was promoted to manager at Kenilworth Road until the end of the 2010–11 season after Richard Money left the club on 28 March 2011. Brabin secured Luton's place in the Conference Premier play-offs, leading them to a 5–1 aggregate victory over Wrexham in the semi-finals. In the final at the City of Manchester Stadium, Luton drew 0–0 after extra time with AFC Wimbledon, and eventually lost 4–3 in a penalty shootout that left the club facing a third-year at non-League level. Brabin received the full support from the Luton board despite the disappointment of the defeat and, one week later, he signed a new two-year contract to stay as permanent manager.

Brabin was sacked on 31 March 2012 after the team fell out of the play-off positions with seven games remaining of the 2011–12 season. His successor, Paul Buckle, led the "Hatters" to the 2012 Conference Premier play-off final on 20 May, where they were beaten by York City. Ironically, just five days later Brabin was convicted of using threatening and behaviour, but cleared of assault, following an altercation with two stewards after he was sent to the stands during a match at York City on 19 April 2011.

=== Return to Southport ===
Brabin returned to Southport for the third time on 6 October 2014, replacing Martin Foyle. He took the club to an FA Cup third round tie with Derby County and up to 20th in the Conference. On 20 January 2015, Brabin left Southport to take up a post at Everton to be part of the coaching set up at the under-21 level. His successor at Haig Avenue, Paul Carden, led Southport to a 19th-place finish at the end of the 2014–15 season.

=== Tranmere Rovers ===
On 5 May 2015, Brabin was appointed as the manager of Tranmere Rovers following their relegation to the National League. He guided Rovers to a sixth-place finish at the end of the 2015–16 season, missing out on the play-offs by just two points. Two of his signings, Andy Cook and James Norwood, would go on to form a highly effective partnership for the club over the following two seasons. He was named as the National League Manager of the Month for August 2016. However, his contract at Prenton Park was terminated on 18 September 2016, with the club in fifth-place but in poor form and his relationship with the club's supporters remaining consistently tense. He was succeeded by Micky Mellon, who led Tranmere to the 2017 National League play-off final, where they were beaten by Forest Green Rovers.

=== Return to coaching ===
Brabin was appointed as a coach at EFL League Two side Port Vale by newly appointed manager Neil Aspin in October 2017. In March 2018, he was named as second favourite to take the management position at Wrexham. In September 2018 he left Vale Park to take up the position as assistant manager to Terry McPhillips at EFL League One side Blackpool. He stepped down from the role for "personal reasons" in March 2019. In June 2019, he returned to Luton as one of Graeme Jones's two assistant managers. Brabin departed Luton in March 2020 following Jones's dismissal.

In April 2021, he was appointed as the Sporting Director at Cymru Premier team The New Saints. In October 2023, he was appointed assistant manager to Micky Mellon at National League side Oldham Athletic, whilst continuing his role at The New Saints. In 2024–25, Brabin was part of the Oldham Athletic coaching staff that won the National League play-offs, defeating Southend United in the final to secure the club's return to the English Football League. Brabin remained as assistant manager as Oldham returned to League Two for the 2025–26 season.

== Career statistics ==
=== Playing statistics ===
Appearances and goals by club, season and competition
Club	Season	League			FA Cup		Other		Total	
Club	Season	Division	Apps	Goals	Apps	Goals	Apps	Goals	Apps	Goals
Stockport County	1989–90	Fourth Division	1	0	0	0	2	0	3	0
Stockport County	1990–91	Fourth Division	1	0	0	0	0	0	1	0
Stockport County	Total		2	0	0	0	2	0	4	0
Doncaster Rovers	1994–95	Third Division	28	8	1	0	4	0	33	8
Doncaster Rovers	1995–96	Third Division	31	3	1	0	2	0	34	3
Doncaster Rovers	Total		59	11	2	0	6	0	67	11
Bury	1995–96	Third Division	5	0	0	0	0	0	5	0
Blackpool	1996–97	Second Division	32	2	1	0	5	0	38	2
Blackpool	1997–98	Second Division	24	3	1	0	4	0	29	3
Blackpool	1998–99	Second Division	7	0	0	0	3	0	10	0
Blackpool	Total		63	5	2	0	12	0	77	5
Lincoln City (loan)	1996–97	Second Division	4	0	0	0	1	0	5	0
Hull City	1998–99	Third Division	21	4	0	0	2	0	23	4
Hull City	1999–2000	Third Division	37	3	3	0	5	0	45	3
Hull City	2000–01	Third Division	37	2	2	0	4	0	43	2
Hull City	Total		95	9	5	0	11	0	111	9
Boston United	2001–02	Conference	1	0	0	0	0	0	1	0
Torquay United	2001–02	Third Division	6	0	1	0	0	0	7	0
Chester City	2001–02	Conference	16	3	0	0	1	0	17	3
Total Network Solutions	2002–03	Welsh Premier League	30	6	—		—		30	6
Total Network Solutions	2003–04	Welsh Premier League	18	1	—		—		18	1
Total Network Solutions	Total		48	7	0	0	0	0	48	7
Halifax Town	2005–06	Conference National	4	1	0	0	0	0	4	1
Southport	2005–06	Conference National	14	0	0	0	0	0	14	0
Burscough	2006–07	Northern Premier League; Premier Division	12	3	0	0	0	0	12	3
The New Saints	2007–08	Welsh Premier League	2	0	—		—		2	0
Career total			331	39	10	0	33	0	374	39

=== Managerial statistics ===
Managerial record by team and tenure
Team	From	To	Record					Ref
Team	From	To	P	W	D	L	Win %	Ref
Southport	8 April 2008	23 June 2008	7	5	0	2	71.4	
Cambridge United	23 June 2008	13 July 2009	54	27	14	13	50.0	
Luton Town	28 March 2011	31 March 2012	62	29	22	11	46.8	
Southport	6 October 2014	20 January 2015	24	9	9	6	37.5	
Tranmere Rovers	5 May 2015	18 September 2016	60	28	15	17	46.7	
Total			207	98	60	49	47.3	—

== Honours ==
=== As a player ===
Individual

- Chester City Player of the Year: 2001–02

Runcorn

- FA Trophy runner-up: 1993 & 1994

=== As a manager ===
Individual

- Conference Premier Manager of the Year: 2008–09
- National League Manager of the Month: August 2016
