= Steve Basham =

English footballer

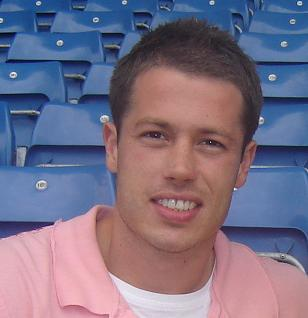
- Steve Basham in 2006

Personal information
- Full name: Steven Brian Basham
- Date of birth: 2 December 1977 (age 48)
- Place of birth: Southampton, England
- Height: 5 ft 10 in (1.78 m)
- Position: Striker

Youth career
- 1994–1996: Southampton

Senior career*
Years	Team	Apps	(Gls)
1996–1999	Southampton	19	(1)
1998	→ Wrexham (loan)	5	(0)
1998	→ Preston North End (loan)	0	(0)
1999	→ Preston North End (loan)	17	(10)
1999–2002	Preston North End	51	(5)
2002–2007	Oxford United	168	(43)
2007–2009	Exeter City	54	(7)
2009–2010	Luton Town	5	(0)
2009–2010	→ Hayes & Yeading United (loan)	14	(8)
2010–2011	Brackley Town		
2011–2014	Oxford City		
- * Club domestic league appearances and goals

Steven Brian Basham (born 2 December 1977) is an English retired footballer.

== Career ==
Basham began his career at Southampton, playing nineteen Premier League games for the club. Basham's only goal for Southampton came in a 2–0 win away to Blackburn Rovers in November 1998. This result led to the resignation of then Blackburn and future England manager Roy Hodgson. He then transferred to Preston North End for £200,000 after a successful loan spell. He won promotion to Division One with Preston in the 1999–2000 season. A series of injuries, including a broken leg, limited Basham's playing opportunities at Preston, and he was released from the club in the summer of 2002.

Shortly after his release, Basham signed for Oxford United. Over the course of five seasons, Basham made 187 appearances for the club, scoring 49 goals. He was part of the side that was relegated to non-league football at the end of the 2005–06 season. His final season at the Kassam Stadium was blighted by a set of serious injuries, resulting in Oxford's decision not to offer him a new contract.

Having been released, he signed a two-year contract for Oxford's Conference Premier rivals Exeter City in the summer of 2007. With Basham as a regular squad member, Exeter were promoted to League Two via the play-offs in 2007–08, and then immediately won direct promotion to League One the next season. At the end of the 2008–09 season, Exeter announced that Basham's contract was not to be extended.

On 6 August 2009, Basham signed for Conference side Luton Town on a one-year contract. After playing in just six games in three months at Luton, in which he scored two goals in the FA Cup against Rochdale, Basham was loaned out to Hayes & Yeading United on 26 November by new Luton manager Richard Money, for an initial period of two months. He scored three goals in seven games, and, during the January transfer window, Basham's loan at Hayes was extended to the end of the 2009–10 season. Over the next seven games, Basham scored five goals, including two in a 2–1 victory over former club Oxford United. On 6 May 2010, it was announced that Basham had refused a contract offer from Hayes & Yeading, and was sent back to parent club Luton Town. He was released from his Luton contract a day later.

In June 2011 he joined Oxford City.

== Honours ==
Preston North End

- Football League Second Division: 1999–2000

Exeter City

- Football League Two second-place promotion: 2008–09
- Conference Premier play-offs: 2008

Oxford City

- Southern Premier League play-offs: 2012
