= Phil Brumwell =

English footballer

Personal information
- Full name: Philip Brumwell
- Date of birth: 8 August 1975
- Place of birth: Newton Aycliffe, England
- Height: 5 ft 10 in (1.78 m)
- Position: Midfielder

Senior career*
Years	Team	Apps	(Gls)
1994–1995	Sunderland	0	(0)
1995–2000	Darlington	156	(1)
2000–2001	Hull City	4	(0)
2001–2002	Darlington	43	(0)
2003–2006	Blyth Spartans	37	(5)
- * Club domestic league appearances and goals

Philip Brumwell (born 8 August 1975) is an English former professional footballer who made more than 200 appearances in the Football League playing as a midfielder for Darlington and Hull City.
