= Keith Russell (footballer) =

English footballer

Personal information
- Date of birth: 31 January 1974 (age 52)
- Place of birth: Aldridge, England
- Position: Midfielder

Senior career*
Years	Team	Apps	(Gls)
- Tamworth
- Atherstone United
1996–1997	Hednesford Town	24	(14)
1997–1998	Blackpool	1	(0)
1998–2000	Altrincham	52	(36)
2000–????	Hednesford Town		
2009–2014	Pelsall Villa		(39)
- * Club domestic league appearances and goals

Keith Russell (born 31 January 1974) is an English footballer who played for Midland Football Combination Premier Division side Pelsall Villa, where he plays as a midfielder.

He played for Blackpool in the Football League in 1997.
