= Ben Dixon (English footballer) =

English footballer

Personal information
- Full name: Benjamin Marcus Alexander Dixon
- Date of birth: 16 September 1974 (age 52)
- Place of birth: Lincoln, England
- Position: Defender

Team information
- Current team: Boston Town

Youth career
- 1991–1993: Lincoln City

Senior career*
Years	Team	Apps	(Gls)
1992–1996	Lincoln City	43	(0)
1993–1994	→ Witton Albion (loan)	4	(0)
1996–1998	Blackpool	13	(0)
1998	Woodlands Wellington		
1998–2004	Whitby Town		
2004	Gainsborough Trinity		
2004–2005	Ossett Town		
2005–2007	Lincoln United		
2007–2008	Grantham Town		
2008–	Boston Town		
- * Club domestic league appearances and goals as of 11 June 2007

Benjamin Marcus Alexander Dixon (born 16 September 1974) is an English footballer. Initially a left-winger, he converted first to a left-back and then a centre-half. He plays for Boston Town.

== Career ==
Dixon began his career with Lincoln City in 1992. In four years with the Imps, he made 43 league appearances.

In 1996, he joined Blackpool, then managed by Gary Megson, who had noticed Dixon during his brief spell with Lincoln. He remained at Bloomfield Road for two years, making thirteen appearances.

Dixon then moved to Singapore to play for Woodlands Wellington. Upon completion of the 1998 S-League season, he returned to England and joined Whitby Town where he spent six seasons, making a total of 237 appearances scoring 15 goals.

Dixon joined Gainsborough Trinity at the start of the 2004–05 season but his stay was brief, moving on to Ossett Town in October 2004. In January 2005, he moved to Lincoln United and remained at Ashby Avenue until the summer of 2007 when he followed his manager, John Wilkinson, and many of the United squad in moving to Grantham Town. It was initially thought that Dixon would retire from football in June 2008 following Grantham's unsuccessful bid for promotion. Dixon transferred to Boston Town midway through the 2008–2009 season.
