= David Brown (footballer, born 1978) =

English footballer

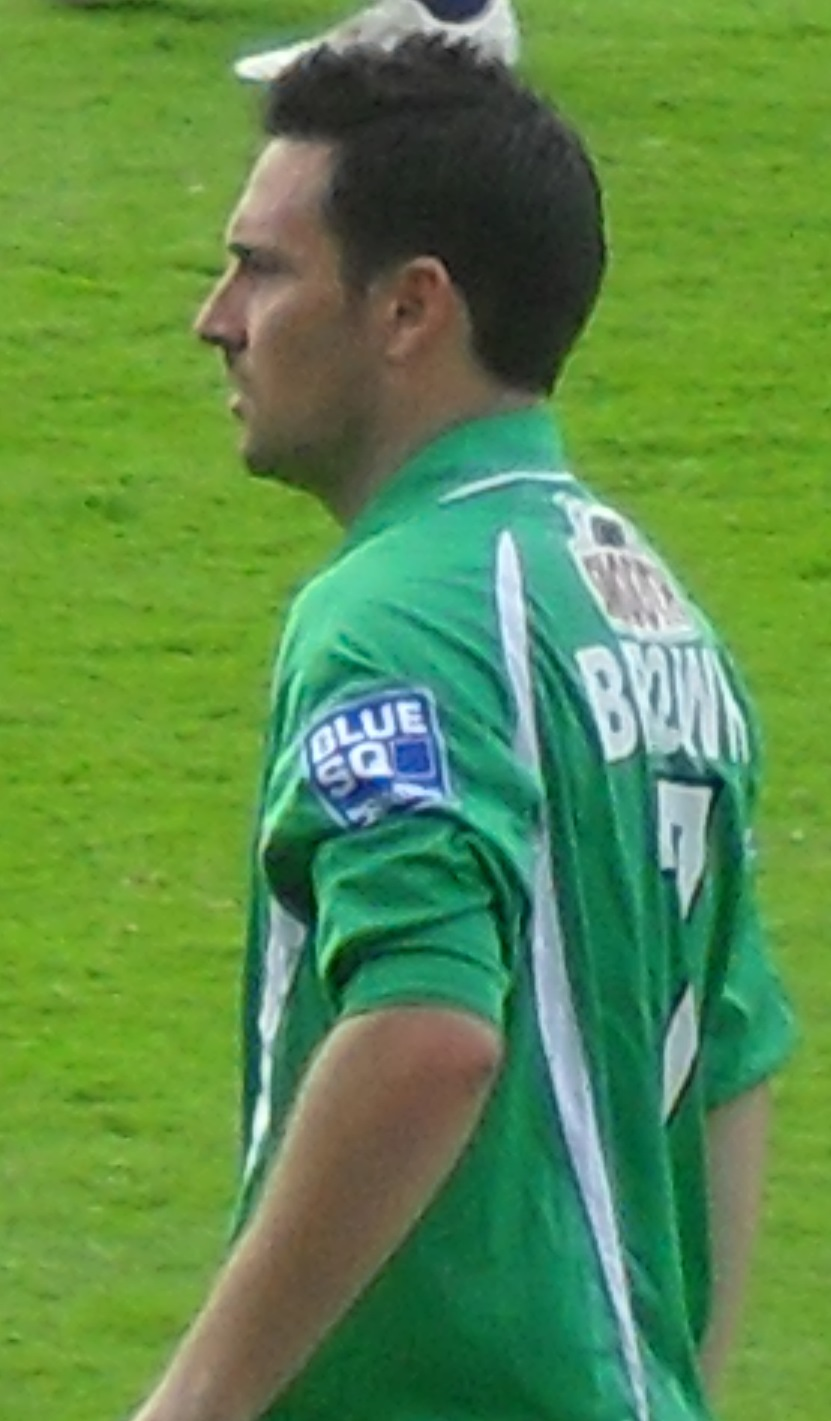
- Brown playing for Forest Green Rovers in 2009

Personal information
- Full name: David Alistair Brown
- Date of birth: 2 October 1978 (age 48)
- Place of birth: Bolton, England
- Height: 5 ft 10 in (1.78 m)
- Position: Striker

Youth career
- 199?–1995: Oldham Athletic
- 1995–1997: Manchester United

Senior career*
Years	Team	Apps	(Gls)
1997–1998	Manchester United	0	(0)
1998	→ Hull City (loan)	8	(2)
1998–2001	Hull City	123	(21)
2001	Torquay United	2	(0)
2001–2002	Chester City	13	(2)
2002–2003	Telford United	34	(14)
2003–2005	Hereford United	67	(22)
2005–2008	Accrington Stanley	75	(14)
2006	→ Burton Albion (loan)	4	(0)
2008	→ Rushden & Diamonds (loan)	2	(0)
2008	→ Northwich Victoria (loan)	9	(1)
2008–2009	Barrow	11	(3)
2009–2010	Forest Green Rovers	60	(7)
2010–2011	Wrexham	9	(1)
Total		417	(87)

Managerial career
- 2009: Forest Green Rovers (caretaker)
- * Club domestic league appearances and goals as of 19:19, 4 April 2010 (UTC)

David Alistair Brown (born 2 October 1978) is an English former footballer who last played for Conference National side Wrexham as a striker.

== Career ==
Born in Bolton, Greater Manchester, Brown began his career with Oldham Athletic, but signed for Manchester United as an apprentice in July 1995. However, the method by which United signed Brown was deemed to have been against Football Association regulations, and the club was fined £20,000. He turned professional in August 1997, but failed to break into the first team at Old Trafford. In March 1998 he joined Hull City on loan until the end of the season, making his league debut on 28 March 1998 in a 0–0 draw against Macclesfield Town at Boothferry Park. In the remainder of the season he played well enough to earn himself a permanent move, completed in June 1998.

He immediately became a regular in the Hull side the following season and even scored against hometown club Bolton Wanderers in a league cup tie, but his failure to score regularly and the signing of new players by Brian Little pushed him out of the frame for a regular starting place. In the July 2001, Brown was made available on a free transfer by Hull City after playing 123 league games, in which he scored 21 times. On 4 September 2001 Brown joined Torquay United on trial, at the same time as Gary Brabin. Neither were taken on at the time by Torquay manager Roy McFarland, although Brabin joined soon after from Boston United.

After playing in Australia, Brown began a second trial with Torquay in early November 2001, McFarland noting that his lack of fitness was the main problem before and giving him a second chance. He signed non-contract terms for Torquay on 9 November, making his debut the following day in the 2–1 defeat at home to Swansea City. He played the following week in the FA Cup against Northampton Town, but was dropped for the derby game against Exeter City a few days later. With Torquay struggling to find a settled forward line, he was recalled for the defeat away to Halifax Town on 24 November, but after another disappointing performance was released immediately after the game.

In December 2001 Brown joined Chester City on trial, impressing manager Steve Mungall enough to earn a contract. However, within days of Brown signing Mungall was sacked and replaced by Mark Wright who released Brown on a free transfer at the end of the season.

He joined Telford United in August 2002, moving to Hereford United in June 2003, although missed the start of the season after breaking his collar-bone in pre-season training. He remained with Hereford until March 2005 when he moved to Accrington Stanley, signing a new two-year deal in June 2005. In the 2005–06 season Brown helped Stanley to promotion to the Football League, with his former club Hereford taking the second promotion place. Brown struggled to gain a regular place in Stanley's league side and in November 2006 joined Burton Albion on loan. He joined Conference National side York City on trial in September 2008 and featured for the reserves in a 2–1 victory against Grimsby Town. However, he was not offered a contract by the club. He joined Barrow of the Conference on non-contract terms in October 2008. His stay with them was brief, being released in January 2009. He was snapped up later that month by Forest Green Rovers.

Brown ended the season partnering prolific striker Andy Mangan and in the summer of 2009 agreed to become player/assistant manager at The New Lawn for the 2009–10 season. After manager Jim Harvey left the club in August, Brown took over as player-caretaker manager. Brown picked up his first point in management leading Forest Green to a battling goalless draw against Oxford United at the Kassam Stadium later that month. In September 2009 his short stint as player-caretaker manager came to an end when Dave Hockaday was appointed permanently as the new manager at the club. Brown remained on the playing staff.

In July 2010, Brown left Forest Green to sign for Wrexham. but was released by the Welsh side after just one season.

== Honours ==
- Conference National: 2006
