= Jon French =

English footballer

Personal information
- Full name: Jonathan French
- Date of birth: 25 September 1976 (age 50)
- Place of birth: Bristol, England
- Position: Forward

Senior career*
Years	Team	Apps	(Gls)
1995–1998	Bristol Rovers	17	(1)
1998–2000	Hull City	15	(0)
1999	Blackpool (loan)	0	(0)
2000–2003	Barry Town	95	(26)
2003–2006	Weston-super-Mare		
2006–2008	Mangotsfield United		
- * Club domestic league appearances and goals

Jonathan French (born 25 September 1976) is an English footballer who played in The Football League for Bristol Rovers and Hull City.

== Career ==
Jon French began his football career playing for his hometown club, Bristol Rovers as a forward in 1995. He made seventeen league appearances and scored one goal for his club. French would later leave the club and join Hull City in 1998. French only made fifteen league appearances scoring no goals. It was then at South Wales club Barry Town where he would make a name for himself. During the three years with Barry Town, he appeared in all fifty-two league matches also scoring seventeen goals for the club. He also appeared in Europe competition for Barry including the notorious 3-1 win against F.C. Porto.

French left Barry Town F.C. in 2003 and went to play for Weston-super-Mare and later playing for Mangotsfield United in 2006 and finished his playing career in 2008.
