= Lee Bracey =

English footballer

Personal information
- Date of birth: 11 September 1968 (age 58)
- Place of birth: Barking, England
- Height: 6 ft 1 in (1.85 m)
- Position: Goalkeeper

Senior career*
Years	Team	Apps	(Gls)
1983-1985	Ashford Town (Kent)	27	(0)
1987–1988	West Ham United	0	(0)
1988–1991	Swansea City	99	(0)
1991–1993	Halifax Town	73	(0)
1993–1996	Bury	67	(0)
1996–1999	Ipswich Town	0	(0)
1999–2001	Hull City	20	(0)
2001–2002	Chorley		
2002–2004	Ossett Town		
2004–2006	Mossley		
2006–2007	Ashton United		
2007–2008	Rossendale United		
Total		292	(0)
- * Club domestic league appearances and goals

Lee Bracey (born 11 September 1968) is an English former footballer who played in The Football League for Swansea City, Halifax Town, Bury and Hull City. He is now a police constable for Greater Manchester Police.

== Career ==
Bracey started his career at Ashford Town (Kent) at a young age before joining West Ham United and then eventually moving to Swansea City in 1988. He spent three years with the Swans before joining fourth division sides Halifax Town and Bury. He then earned a move to division one side Ipswich Town but after failing to make a single appearance in three years with the club he joined Hull City. After his time in league football Bracey played for several non-league teams. He now works as a constable for Greater Manchester police.
