= John Eyre (footballer) =

English retired football forward

- Eyre in 2026

Personal information
- Full name: John Robert Eyre
- Date of birth: 9 October 1974 (age 52)
- Place of birth: Hull, England
- Height: 6 ft 0 in (1.83 m)
- Position: Forward

Senior career*
Years	Team	Apps	(Gls)
1993–1995	Oldham Athletic	10	(1)
1994–1995	→ Scunthorpe United (loan)	9	(8)
1995–1999	Scunthorpe United	164	(43)
1999–2001	Hull City	52	(13)
2001–2005	Oldham Athletic	114	(14)
- North Ferriby United
- Brigg Town
- * Club domestic league appearances and goals

John Eyre (born 9 October 1974) is an English former professional footballer who played as a forward.

== Career ==
Eyre's senior career began at Oldham Athletic in 1993. He made 10 appearances for them, scoring one goal before being loaned to Scunthorpe United.

Following a successful goalscoring spell on loan, Eyre joined Scunthorpe United permanently in 1995. He stayed there for five years, making over 150 appearances, before transferring to local rivals Hull City, his hometown club, in 1999. "Johnny Eyre" as he was affectionately known by Scunthorpe and then Hull fans, made over 50 appearances for The Tigers, scoring 13 times, before transferring to Oldham Athletic in 2001, where his senior career had begun.

Eyre made over 100 appearances for Oldham Athletic in his second stint at the club, before being released in 2005. He made further appearances for non-league clubs North Ferriby United and Brigg Town before retiring from professional football.

Following his retirement from playing football, Eyre briefly became a football agent, before a stint as a car salesman. He now works for hometown club Hull City as their kitman.
