= Gareth Williams (footballer, born 1967) =

English footballer

Personal information
- Date of birth: 12 March 1967 (age 59)
- Place of birth: Cowes, Isle of Wight, England
- Position: Midfielder

Senior career*
| Years | Team | Apps | (Gls) |
| 1985–1986 | East Cowes Victoria Athletic | | |
| 1986–1987 | Gosport Borough | | |
| 1988–1991 | Aston Villa | 12 | (0) |
| 1991–1994 | Barnsley | 34 | (6) |
| 1992 | → Hull City (loan) | 4 | (0) |
| 1993 | → Hull City (loan) | 16 | (2) |
| 1994 | AFC Bournemouth | 1 | (0) |
| 1994–1995 | Northampton Town | 50 | (1) |
| 1996–1998 | Scarborough | 105 | (27) |
| 1998–1999 | Hull City | 38 | (2) |
| 1999–2000 | Scarborough | 19 | (0) |
| 2000–2001 | Ilkeston Town | 20 | (2) |
| 2001–2002 | Gainsborough Trinity | | |
| 2002–2010 | Matlock Town | | |

Managerial career
- 2004–2008: Matlock Town (player-manager)
- * Club domestic league appearances and goals

Gareth Williams, born 12 March 1967) is an English former professional footballer. He usually played in midfield, but also played as a winger.
