= Jamie Wood =

English footballer (born 1978)

Personal information
- Full name: Jamie Wood
- Date of birth: 21 September 1978 (age 48)
- Place of birth: Salford, England
- Height: 1.78 m (5 ft 10 in)
- Position: Striker

Youth career
- 1995–1997: Manchester United

Senior career*
Years	Team	Apps	(Gls)
1997–1999	Manchester United	0	(0)
1999	→ Royal Antwerp (loan)	7	(1)
1999–2001	Hull City	47	(6)
2001–2002	Halifax Town	16	(0)
2002–2003	Swansea City	17	(2)
2003–2011	The New Saints	181	(38)
Total		268	(47)

International career
2001	Cayman Islands	2	(0)
- * Club domestic league appearances and goals

Jamie Wood (born 21 September 1978) is a former professional footballer who played as a striker. He was born in Salford, England and started his career as a youth player at Manchester United. Wood has represented the Cayman Islands internationally making his debut in 2001. He last played for Welsh Premier side The New Saints where he won the Welsh Premier League title multiple times, the League Cup and also the Welsh Cup.

In May 2011 he was released by the club after 8 years at Park Hall.
