= Colin Alcide =

English footballer

Personal information
- Full name: Colin James Alcide
- Date of birth: 14 April 1972 (age 54)
- Place of birth: Huddersfield, England
- Position: Striker

Senior career*
Years	Team	Apps	(Gls)
1991–1992	Emley		
1992–1993	Altrincham	3	(0)
1994–1995	Emley		
1995–1999	Lincoln City	121	(27)
1999	→ Hull City (loan)	3	(1)
1999	Hull City	2	(0)
1999	Lincoln City	1	(0)
1999	Hull City	24	(3)
1999–2001	York City	53	(7)
2001–2002	Cambridge United	8	(0)
2002–2003	Gainsborough Trinity		
2002–2003	Exeter City	1	(0)
2004	TNS	2	(0)
2004	Ashton United	11	(2)
Total		237	(40)
- * Club domestic league appearances and goals

Colin James Alcide (born 14 April 1972) is an English former professional footballer.

He was a striker from 1991 until 2004 and made more than 200 appearances in the Football League playing for Lincoln City, Hull City, York City, Cambridge United and Exeter City. Alcide played non-League football for Emley, Altrincham, Gainsborough Trinity and Ashton United with a spell in Wales with TNS.

== Career ==
Alcide began his career in local football before joining Emley. In the middle of 1992, following just one season with Emley, he followed his manager Gerry Quinn across the pennines to Altrincham. He then returned to Emley before signing for Lincoln City and beginning his Football League career. In 1998, he formed a strike partnership with Leo Fortune-West. Alcide moved to Hull City in 1999. In 2001, he joined Cambridge United. At Cambridge he scored once in the League Cup against West Bromwich Albion.

In the middle of 2004, Alcide reappeared in the colours of TNS for whom he appeared against Osters IF in the UEFA Cup but did not remain for the Welsh Premier League season, instead linking up with his former Emley and Altrincham manager Gerry Quinn at Ashton United in Conference North. His spell at Ashton was interrupted by illness and injury, prompting his retirement in October 2004.

== Personal life ==
Alcide now lives in Huddersfield and had continued to play amateur football, notably for Bay Athletic.
