= Steve Burton (footballer, born 1982) =

English footballer

Personal information
- Full name: Steven Peter Graham Burton
- Date of birth: 10 October 1982 (age 44)
- Place of birth: Hull, England
- Height: 6 ft 1 in (1.85 m)
- Position: Defender

Youth career
- ?–2002: Hull City

Senior career*
Years	Team	Apps	(Gls)
2002–2004	Hull City	11	(0)
2003	→ Kidderminster Harriers (loan)	7	(0)
2004–2006	Kidderminster Harriers	25	(0)
2006–2007	Richmond	50	(6)
2007–2010	Green Gully		
2010–2011	North Ferriby United		
2012–2013	Östersunds FK	34	(0)
- * Club domestic league appearances and goals as of 23 November 2013

Steven Peter Graham Burton (born 10 October 1982) is an English footballer who last played for Östersunds FK.

== Career ==
Born in Hull, Burton, a left footed defender, worked his way through the Hull City Academy and was taken on as a Youth Trainee within the School of Excellence. He was given his first start by youth coach Billy Russell (now caretaker manager), in an evening match against Rochdale on 12 October 2000. There he was seen by Peter Taylor, who gave Burton a further year's contract. Unable to maintain a first team place with Hull, Burton was sent on loan to various clubs including Kidderminster Harriers, where Hull City's former manager, Jan Molby, was in charge. Molby eventually managed to lure Burton away from Hull and to agree permanent terms at Kidderminster. Following one successful season at Aggborough Stadium, Kidderminster started to flounder and Molby was released. His replacement, Stuart Watkiss, left Burton out of his first team plans and, with fewer matches for Burton, he left to pursue a career in football in Melbourne, Australia with Richmond. After one season with Richmond, Burton joined Green Gully. In October 2010 he returned to England and signed for North Ferriby United. After five months in England with North Ferriby United signed in March 2011 for Östersunds FK.(Sweden)
