= David D'Auria =

Welsh footballer

Personal information
- Date of birth: 26 March 1970 (age 56)
- Place of birth: Swansea, Wales
- Position: Midfielder

Senior career*
Years	Team	Apps	(Gls)
1988–1991	Swansea City	45	(6)
1991–1993	Merthyr Tydfil		
1993–1994	Barry Town		
1994–1995	Scarborough	52	(8)
1995–1998	Scunthorpe United	107	(18)
1998–1999	Hull City	54	(4)
1999–2002	Chesterfield	25	(1)
2003	Llanelli	16	(1)
2003–2004	Skewen Athletic		
2005–2008	Neath		
Total		298	(38)

Managerial career
- 2017–: Garden Village
- * Club domestic league appearances and goals

David D'Auria (born 26 March 1970) is a Welsh football midfielder. He was born in Swansea, and played for Football League clubs in both Wales and England. D'Auria helped Barry Town win the Welsh Cup in 1994, scoring the opening goal in the final against Cardiff City.

D'Auria has been the first-team manager of Garden Village FC since June 2017.
