= Jason Perry (footballer) =

Welsh footballer (born 1970)

Personal information
- Date of birth: 2 April 1970 (age 56)
- Place of birth: Caerphilly, Wales
- Position: Defender

Senior career*
Years	Team	Apps	(Gls)
1987-1997	Cardiff City	281	(5)
1997-1998	Bristol Rovers	25	(0)
1998	Lincoln City	12	(0)
1998-2001	Hull City	15	(0)
2001-2003	Newport County	30	(0)
2003-2005	Cwmbran Town	55	(3)
Total		418	(8)

International career
1994	Wales	1	(0)
- * Club domestic league appearances and goals

Jason Perry (born 2 April 1970) is a Welsh former professional footballer and Wales international. A centre-half, he was highly regarded by supporters for his strong tackling and uncompromising style. He attained one cap for Wales in 1994.

== Club career ==
Perry began his career at Cardiff City, making his debut in a 0–0 draw against Exeter City in March 1987, but it wasn't until the 1989–90 season that he managed to force his way into a regular first team place and helped the club to win promotion to Division Two in 1993. Perry hardly missed a game for the club up until the 1995–96 season when he suffered a number of injuries that kept him out of the side for most of the year. The following year he managed to bounce back to help the club reach the play-offs but was allowed to leave the club at the end of the season to join Bristol Rovers. After only one year he left the club and spells at Lincoln City and Hull City followed before he returned to Wales to sign for Newport County, working as a player-coach. He finished his career at Welsh Premier League side Cwmbran Town in 2005.

== International career ==
During his career, Perry made one appearance for Wales when he played in a 3–1 defeat to Norway on 9 March 1994.

== After football ==
Perry is now a Lecturer and the director of football at Bridgend College. He also works for the BBC as both a columnist and commentator covering Cardiff City and the Wales national team.

== Honours ==
Cardiff City

- Football League Third Division: 1992–93
- Football League Fourth Division runner-up: 1987–88
- Welsh Cup runner-up: 1987–88, 1991–92, 1992–93

Newport County

- FAW Premier Cup runner-up: 2002–03

Sporting positions
Preceded by Paul Ramsey	Cardiff City captain 1993–1997	Succeeded by Dave Penney
