= Jason Harris (footballer, born 1976) =

English footballer (born 1976)

Personal information
- Date of birth: 24 November 1976 (age 49)
- Place of birth: Sutton, London, England
- Position: Forward

Senior career*
Years	Team	Apps	(Gls)
1994–1997	Crystal Palace	2	(0)
1995	→ Dover Athletic (loan)		
1996–1997	→ Bristol Rovers (loan)	6	(2)
1997	→ Lincoln City (loan)	1	(0)
1997–1998	Leyton Orient	40	(9)
1998–1999	Preston North End	36	(6)
1999–2001	Hull City	38	(4)
2001	→ Shrewsbury Town (loan)	4	(0)
2001	Southend United	5	(0)
2001–2002	Harrogate Town	?	(?)
2002	Nuneaton Borough	23	(6)
2002–200?	Harrogate Town	?	(?)
200?–2003	Goole	?	(?)
2003–2004	Bridlington Town	?	(?)
2004	Ossett Town	?	(?)
2004–20??	Selby Town	?	(?)
- * Club domestic league appearances and goals

Jason Harris (born 24 November 1976) is an English footballer who played in the English Football League for a number of clubs before dropping into non-League football.
