= Steve Wilson (footballer) =

English footballer

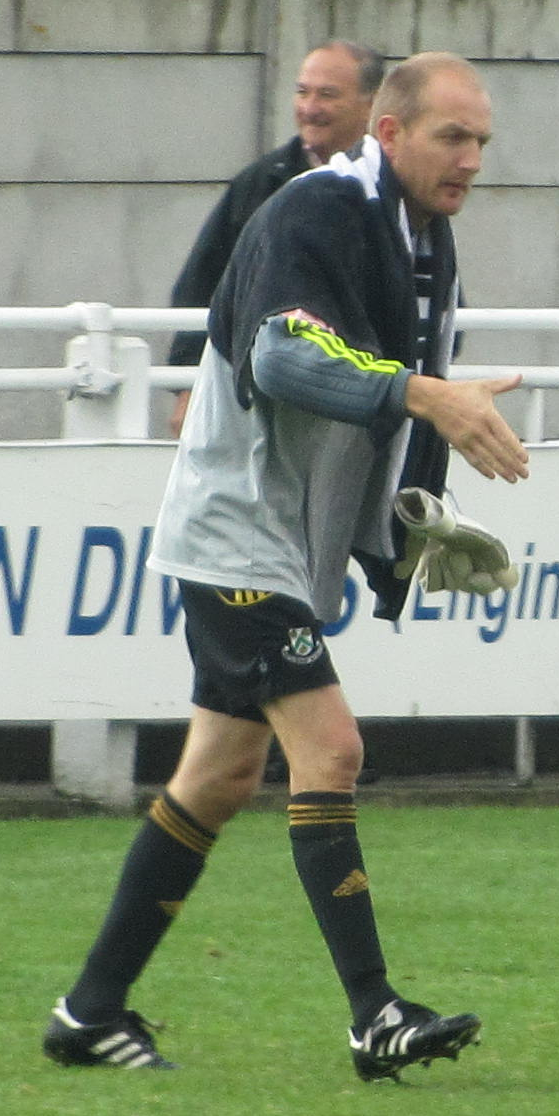
- Wilson playing for North Ferriby United in 2011

Personal information
- Full name: Stephen Lee Wilson
- Date of birth: 24 April 1974 (age 52)
- Place of birth: Hull, England
- Position: Goalkeeper

Team information
- Current team: Scarborough Athletic

Youth career
- ?–1991: Hull City

Senior career*
Years	Team	Apps	(Gls)
1991–2001	Hull City	181	(0)
2001	→ Macclesfield Town (loan)	1	(0)
2001–2005	Macclesfield Town	133	(0)
2005–2006	Tranmere Rovers	12	(0)
2006	Worksop Town	8	(0)
2006–2007	Mossley	13	(0)
2007–2008	Hall Road Rangers	?	(?)
2008–2012	North Ferriby United	132	(0)
2012	Scarborough Athletic	1	(0)
Total		481	(0)
- * Club domestic league appearances and goals as of 16:20, 28 August 2011 (UTC)

Stephen Lee Wilson (born 24 April 1974) is an English footballer who plays as a goalkeeper. During his career he has played for Hull City, Macclesfield Town and Tranmere Rovers in the Football League, as well as non-League clubs Worksop Town, Mossley, Hall Road Rangers, North Ferriby United and Scarborough Athletic

== Career ==
Wilson grew up in Bransholme, Kingston upon Hull and came through the youth system at home-town club Hull City. He made his first-team debut in 1991 at the age of seventeen. He went on to make a total of 219 appearances in all competitions for Hull before being released at the end of the 2000–01 season. He ended the campaign on loan at Macclesfield Town, and signed permanently for the Cheshire club that summer. He spent four years at Moss Rose, appearing in 154 competitive games for Macclesfield, and was voted Supporters' Player of the Year in 2003. In July 2005 he signed a one-year contract with Tranmere Rovers, providing cover for their established first-choice goalkeeper John Achterberg. Wilson made 12 appearances during the 2005–06 season, but his contract was not renewed.

Wilson then moved into non-league football, beginning the following campaign at Worksop Town before moving on to Mossley. After a brief spell with Hall Road Rangers, he signed for North Ferriby United towards the end of the 2007–08 season, eventually spending four years with the club and making 132 league appearances. Wilson served as first choice during the most successful period in the club's history to date, with North Ferriby twice reaching the Northern Premier League Premier Division play-offs, as well as winning the East Riding Senior Cup four times and the Northern Premier League Challenge Cup once.

Wilson announced his retirement as a player at the end of the 2011–12 season

Wilson came out of retirement in August 2012 when he signed for Scarborough Athletic.
