= Jon Whitney (footballer) =

English footballer and manager

Personal information
- Full name: Jonathan David Whitney
- Date of birth: 23 December 1970 (age 55)
- Place of birth: Nantwich, England
- Position: Defender

Youth career
- 1988–1989: Wigan Athletic

Senior career*
Years	Team	Apps	(Gls)
1989–1990	Skelmersdale United	0	(0)
1992–1993	Winsford United	0	(0)
1993–1996	Huddersfield Town	18	(0)
1994	→ Wigan Athletic (loan)	12	(0)
1996–1999	Lincoln City	101	(8)
1999–2001	Hull City	57	(3)
2001–2002	King's Lynn	5	(1)
Total		184	(12)

Managerial career
- 2016–2018: Walsall
- * Club domestic league appearances and goals

Jonathan David "Jon" Whitney (born 23 December 1970) is an English former professional footballer who played as a defender in the Football League. He was later manager of Walsall from 2016 to 2018.

== Walsall ==
In December 2003, Whitney was appointed physiotherapist at Walsall having previously worked, after his footballing retirement, as a Sports Therapist in his own clinic whilst also helping his father-in-law dig graves in his role as undertaker and pursuing a bachelor's degree in physiotherapy at the University of Salford, graduating in 2006. On 7 November 2006 Whitney made a brief playing come back, appearing for Walsall in the 2–1 Birmingham Senior Cup victory over Burton Albion.

== Coaching ==
On 4 January 2011, Walsall announced the departure of Manager, Chris Hutchings and his Assistant, Martin O'Connor. On the same day, Walsall's Head of Youth, Dean Smith, was confirmed as Caretaker Manager and it was announced that Whitney would be assisting Smith in First Team Affairs. On 21 January 2011, Walsall confirmed Smith as Manager, whilst Whitney was appointed as Assistant Manager until the end of the season. He combined the role of Assistant Manager with the role of Club Physiotherapist.

On 1 June 2016, Whitney was appointed manager of Walsall on a three-year contract. On 12 March 2018, Whitney was dismissed as manager.

Whitney is currently working for Hartlepool United in a consultant role and is helping the club manage their fitness and sport science.

== Managerial statistics ==
As of match played 10 March 2018

Managerial record by team and tenure
Team	From	To	Record					Ref
Team	From	To	P	W	D	L	Win %	Ref
Walsall	7 March 2016	12 March 2018	109	38	29	42	34.9	
Total			109	38	29	42	34.9	—
