= Ben Morley =

English footballer

Personal information
- Date of birth: 22 December 1980 (age 45)
- Place of birth: Kingston upon Hull, England
- Position: Defender

Senior career*
Years	Team	Apps	(Gls)
1997–2002	Hull City	26	(0)
2002	Boston United (loan)	2	(0)
2002–2003	Telford United (loan)	5	(0)
2003–2004	Gainsborough Trinity	?	(?)
2004–2005	Winterton Rangers	?	(?)
2005–2013	North Ferriby United	?	(?)
- * Club domestic league appearances and goals

Ben Morley (born 20 December 1980) is an English footballer who played in The Football League for Boston United and Hull City. He latterly played for North Ferriby United.
