= Neil Mann (English footballer) =

English footballer

Personal information
- Date of birth: 19 November 1972 (age 53)
- Place of birth: Nottingham, England
- Position: Full back

Youth career
- 1989–1990: Notts County

Senior career*
Years	Team	Apps	(Gls)
1990–1991	Grimsby Town	0	(0)
1991	Spalding United		
1992–1993	Grantham Town		
1993–2002	Hull City	175	(9)
2002	Scarborough	2	(0)
2002	Gainsborough Trinity		
- * Club domestic league appearances and goals

Neil Mann (born 19 November 1972) is an English former professional footballer who made 177 appearances in the Football League playing for Hull City and Scarborough. He currently coaches in Australia after leaving his role as Youth Recruitment Officer for Hull City in September 2013. He is the son of former footballer Arthur Fraser Mann

== Career ==
Neil Mann was an attacking left-sided fullback/midfielder. He played for various non-league teams in England before being signed by Terry Dolan for Hull City in July 1993. He went on to become a fans favourite but his career was curtailed by a series of serious knee ligament injuries.

He is the son of Scottish former professional footballer and manager Arthur Mann.
