= 2023 St Patrick's Athletic F.C. season =

St Patrick's Athletic F.C.
2023 season
- Chairman: Garrett Kelleher
- Manager: Tim Clancy (until 2 May); Jon Daly (from 2 May)
- Stadium: Richmond Park, Inchicore, Dublin 8
- League of Ireland Premier Division: 3rd
- FAI Cup: Champions
- UEFA Europa Conference League: First Qualifying Round (Eliminated by F91 Dudelange)
- Leinster Senior Cup: Fourth Round (Eliminated by Wexford)
- Top goalscorer: League: Chris Forrester – 13 goals All: Chris Forrester – 15 goals
- Highest home attendance: 5,022 vs Shamrock Rovers (27 October)
- Lowest home attendance: 800 (Est.) vs Wexford (31 January)
Home colours	Away colours	Third colours

The 2023 season was St Patrick's Athletic F.C.'s 94th year in existence and was the Supersaint's 72nd consecutive season in the top-flight of Irish football. It was the second season in charge for manager Tim Clancy, having taken over from Stephen O'Donnell in December 2021. Pre-season training for the squad began in January 2023. The fixtures were released on 15 December 2022, with Pat's down to play the previous season's runners up Derry City at home on the opening night of the season. On 2 May 2023, manager Tim Clancy was sacked, with his assistant Jon Daly taking over as interim manager initially, before being made permanent manager on 22 May 2023.

The club exited the Leinster Senior Cup at the first hurdle, losing to Wexford in January with a mostly under 19s team playing. The also existed the UEFA Europa Conference League at the first hurdle, losing at home and away to F91 Dudelange of Luxembourg, before going on to finish 3rd in the league and winning their 5th ever FAI Cup title by defeating Bohemians 3–1 in the final at the Aviva Stadium, in front of a record domestic crowd of 43,881 people.

== Squad ==
No.	Name	Position(s)	Nationality	Hometown	Date of birth (age)	Previous club	Year signed	Club apps.	Club goals
Goalkeepers
1	Danny Rogers	GK	(Republic of Ireland)	New York City, United States	23 March 1994 (age 32)	(England) Oldham Athletic	2022	11	0
23	David Odumosu	GK	(Republic of Ireland)	Dundalk, Louth	23 March 2001 (age 25)	(Republic of Ireland) Drogheda United	2022	7	0
29	Matt Boylan	GK	(Republic of Ireland)	(England) Welwyn Garden City, Hertfordshire	4 July 2004 (age 22)	(England) Bromley	2023	0	0
36	Dean Lyness	GK	(England)	Halesowen, West Midlands	20 July 1991 (age 35)	(Scotland) Airdrieonians	2023	38	0
40	Darragh Mooney	GK	(Republic of Ireland)	Dublin	8 December 2004 (age 21)	(Republic of Ireland) St Patrick's Athletic Academy	2023	0	0
Defenders
2	Noah Lewis	CB	(Netherlands)	Almere, Flevoland	23 August 2000 (age 26)	(Netherlands) Willem II	2023	18	2
3	Anthony Breslin	LB	(Republic of Ireland)	Blanchardstown, Dublin	13 February 1997 (age 29)	(Republic of Ireland) Bohemians	2022	81	2
4	Joe Redmond	CB	(Republic of Ireland)	Tallaght, Dublin	21 January 2000 (age 26)	(Republic of Ireland) Drogheda United	2022	67	4
5	Tom Grivosti	CB	(England)	West Derby, Liverpool	15 June 1999 (age 27)	(Scotland) Ross County	2022	44	2
12	Harry Brockbank	RB/CB	(England)	Bolton, Greater Manchester	26 September 1998 (age 28)	(United States) El Paso Locomotive	2022	24	0
13	David Norman Jr.	CB	(Canada)	New Westminster, Vancouver	31 May 1998 (age 28)	(England) Northampton Town	2023	13	0
21	Axel Sjöberg	RB	(Sweden)	Helsingborg, Skåne County	12 April 2000 (age 26)	(Sweden) BK Olympic	2023	7	0
22	Sam Curtis	RB/CB	(Republic of Ireland)	Navan, Meath	1 December 2005 (age 20)	(Republic of Ireland) St Patrick's Athletic Academy	2021	60	3
23	Ryan McLaughlin	RB	(Northern Ireland)	Andersonstown, Belfast	30 September 1994 (age 32)	(England) Morecambe	2023	4	0
26	Jay McGrath	CB	(Republic of Ireland)	(England) Doncaster, South Yorkshire	15 April 2003 (age 23)	(England) Coventry City	2023	32	1
33	Sean McHale	CB	(Republic of Ireland)	Dunboyne, Meath	26 March 2005 (age 21)	(Republic of Ireland) St Patrick's Athletic Academy	2023	1	0
34	Dan McHale	CB	(Republic of Ireland)	Firhouse, Dublin	1 April 2005 (age 21)	(Republic of Ireland) St Patrick's Athletic Academy	2023	1	0
39	Luke O'Brien	LB	(Republic of Ireland)	Lucan, Dublin	13 January 2005 (age 21)	(Republic of Ireland) St Patrick's Athletic Academy	2023	1	0
–	Darragh Dunne	RB	(Republic of Ireland)	Palmerstown, Dublin	26 April 2005 (age 21)	(Republic of Ireland) St Patrick's Athletic Academy	2023	1	0
Midfielders
6	Jamie Lennon	CDM/CM	(Republic of Ireland)	Santry, Dublin	9 May 1998 (age 28)	(Republic of Ireland) St Patrick's Athletic Academy	2017	175	2
7	Serge Atakayi	RW/ST	(Finland)	(Democratic Republic of the Congo) Kinshasa, DR Congo	30 January 1999 (age 27)	(Finland) SJK	2022	27	5
8	Chris Forrester	CM/CAM	(Republic of Ireland)	Smithfield, Dublin	17 December 1992 (age 33)	(Scotland) Aberdeen	2019	333	78
11	Jason McClelland	LW/CM/LB	(Republic of Ireland)	Templeogue, Dublin	5 March 1997 (age 29)	(Republic of Ireland) UCD	2020	96	8
14	Mark Doyle	LW/ST	(Republic of Ireland)	Skerries, Dublin	19 November 1998 (age 27)	(Republic of Ireland) Drogheda United	2022	73	15
17	Vladislav Kreida	CM/CDM	(Estonia)	Tallinn, Harju County	25 September 1999 (age 27)	(Estonia) Flora	2023	11	0
17	Kian Leavy	CAM/LW/RW	(Republic of Ireland)	Ardee, Louth	21 March 2002 (age 24)	(England) Reading	2023	12	1
18	Ben McCormack	CAM	(Republic of Ireland)	Harmonstown, Dublin	4 April 2003 (age 23)	(Republic of Ireland) St Patrick's Athletic Academy	2019	72	4
19	Alex Nolan	LW	(Republic of Ireland)	Dunboyne, Meath	20 March 2003 (age 23)	(Republic of Ireland) UCD	2023	13	0
20	Jake Mulraney	LW/RW	(Republic of Ireland)	Drimnagh, Dublin	5 April 1996 (age 30)	(United States) Orlando City	2023	36	6
24	Adam Murphy	CM	(Republic of Ireland)	Donnycarney, Dublin	8 April 2005 (age 21)	(Republic of Ireland) St Patrick's Athletic Academy	2021	40	3
25	Thijs Timmermans	CM	(Netherlands)	Hazerswoude-Dorp, Alphen aan den Rijn	25 July 1998 (age 28)	(Cyprus) PAEEK	2022	31	1
28	Rhys Bartley	CM	(Republic of Ireland)	Finglas, Dublin	3 March 2006 (age 20)	(Republic of Ireland) St Patrick's Athletic Academy	2023	1	0
32	Darius Lipsiuc	CAM	(Republic of Ireland)	Dunboyne, Meath	16 September 2005 (age 21)	(Republic of Ireland) St Patrick's Athletic Academy	2022	2	0
35	Anthony Dodd	CM	(Republic of Ireland)	Dublin	19 February 2006 (age 20)	(Republic of Ireland) St Patrick's Athletic Academy	2022	1	0
38	Jason Folarin Oyenuga	RW	(Republic of Ireland)	Ongar, Dublin	20 November 2005 (age 20)	(Republic of Ireland) St Patrick's Athletic Academy	2023	1	0
44	James Byrne	CM	(Republic of Ireland)	Dublin	3 August 2005 (age 21)	(Republic of Ireland) St Patrick's Athletic Academy	2023	1	0
–	Jamie Gray	CM	(Republic of Ireland)	Clondalkin, Dublin	28 May 2004 (age 22)	(Republic of Ireland) St Patrick's Athletic Academy	2023	1	0
Forwards
9	Eoin Doyle	ST	(Republic of Ireland)	Firhouse, Dublin	12 March 1988 (age 38)	(England) Bolton Wanderers	2022	62	19
10	Tommy Lonergan	ST	(Republic of Ireland)	Dunboyne, Meath	2 January 2004 (age 22)	(Republic of Ireland) UCD	2023	39	6
15	Conor Carty	ST	(Republic of Ireland)	Dunlavin, Wicklow	25 May 2002 (age 24)	(England) Bolton Wanderers	2023	41	6
41	Mason Melia	ST	(Republic of Ireland)	Newtownmountkennedy, Wicklow	22 September 2007 (age 19)	(Republic of Ireland) St Patrick's Athletic Academy	2023	13	3
–	Evan Harte	ST	(Republic of Ireland)	Dublin	19 January 2004 (age 22)	(Republic of Ireland) St Patrick's Athletic Academy	2023	1	0

=== Transfers ===
==== Transfers in ====
Date	Position	Nationality	Name	From	Fee	Ref.
25 November 2022	ST	(Republic of Ireland)	Tommy Lonergan	(Republic of Ireland) UCD	Free transfer	
12 January 2023	CM	(Estonia)	Vladislav Kreida	(Estonia) Flora	Loan	
18 January 2023	LW	(Republic of Ireland)	Jake Mulraney	(United States) Orlando City	Undisclosed fee	
26 January 2023	CB	(Netherlands)	Noah Lewis	(Netherlands) Willem II	Free transfer	
4 February 2023	ST	(Republic of Ireland)	Conor Carty	(England) Bolton Wanderers	Loan	
14 February 2023	CB	(Republic of Ireland)	Jay McGrath	(England) Coventry City	Loan	
3 March 2023	GK	(England)	Dean Lyness	(Scotland) Airdrieonians	Free transfer	
3 March 2023	RB	(Sweden)	Axel Sjöberg	(Sweden) BK Olympic	Free transfer	
1 July 2023	CB	(Canada)	David Norman Jr.	(England) Northampton Town	Free transfer	
1 July 2023	GK	(Republic of Ireland)	Matt Boylan	(England) Bromley	Free transfer	
1 July 2023	CB	(Republic of Ireland)	Jay McGrath	(England) Coventry City	Free transfer	
6 July 2023	LW	(Republic of Ireland)	Alex Nolan	(Republic of Ireland) UCD	Free transfer	
6 July 2023	CAM	(Republic of Ireland)	Kian Leavy	(England) Reading	Free transfer	
28 July 2023	RB	(Northern Ireland)	Ryan McLaughlin	(England) Morecambe	Free transfer	

==== Transfers out ====
Date	Position	Nationality	Name	To	Fee	Ref.
18 November 2022	ST	(Republic of Ireland)	Kyle Robinson	(Republic of Ireland) Shelbourne	Free transfer	
30 November 2022	LB	(Republic of Ireland)	Ian Bermingham	Retired		
30 November 2022	CM	(Republic of Ireland)	Adam O'Reilly	(England) Preston North End	End of loan	
30 November 2022	RB	(Republic of Ireland)	Barry Cotter	(Republic of Ireland) Shamrock Rovers	End of loan	
10 December 2022	ST	(Belgium)	Tunde Owolabi	(Republic of Ireland) Cork City	Free transfer	
12 December 2022	CB	(Republic of Ireland)	Paddy Barrett	(Republic of Ireland) Shelbourne	Mutual Consent	
17 January 2023	CM	(Republic of Ireland)	Ross Fay	(Republic of Ireland) Longford Town	Free transfer	
25 January 2023	CB	(Republic of Ireland)	Cian Kelly	(Spain) FC Malaga City	Free transfer	
27 January 2023	LW	(Scotland)	Billy King	(United States) Northern Colorado Hailstorm	Free transfer	
14 February 2023	ST	(Republic of Ireland)	Ronan Coughlan	(Republic of Ireland) Waterford	Free transfer	
20 February 2023	CM	(Republic of Ireland)	Kian Corbally	(Republic of Ireland) Wexford	Free transfer	
1 July 2023	RW	(Finland)	Serge Atakayi	(Republic of Ireland) Waterford	Loan	
1 July 2023	CM	(Estonia)	Vladislav Kreida	(Estonia) Flora	End of loan	
1 July 2023	CB	(Republic of Ireland)	Jay McGrath	(England) Coventry City	End of loan	
6 July 2023	GK	(Republic of Ireland)	David Odumosu	(Northern Ireland) Cliftonville	Loan	
27 July 2023	ST	(Republic of Ireland)	Eoin Doyle	Retired		
12 August 2023	CB	(Netherlands)	Noah Lewis	N/A	Mutual Consent	

=== Squad statistics ===
==== Appearances, goals and cards ====
Number in brackets represents (appearances of which were substituted ON). Last updated – 14 November 2023

No.	Player	SSE Airtricity League		FAI Cup		UEFA Europa Conference League		Leinster Senior Cup		Total	
No.	Player	Apps	Goals	Apps	Goals	Apps	Goals	Apps	Goals	Apps	Goals
1	Danny Rogers	0	0	0	0	0	0	1	0	1	0
3	Anthony Breslin	36	0	5	0	2	0	0	0	43	0
4	Joe Redmond	20	3	5(1)	0	0	0	0	0	25(1)	3
5	Tom Grivosti	8(2)	0	0	0	0	0	0	0	8(2)	0
6	Jamie Lennon	31	1	5	0	2	0	0	0	38	1
8	Chris Forrester	36(2)	13	5	2	2	0	1	0	44(2)	15
10	Tommy Lonergan	31(20)	4	5(4)	2	2(2)	0	0	0	38(26)	6
11	Jason McClelland	23(7)	4	5(2)	0	1(1)	0	1	0	30(10)	4
12	Harry Brockbank	6(2)	0	0	0	2	0	1	0	9(2)	0
13	David Norman Jr.	8(3)	0	3	0	2(1)	0	0	0	13(4)	0
14	Mark Doyle	31(11)	7	5(1)	2	2(1)	1	0	0	38(13)	10
15	Conor Carty	34(16)	5	5(1)	1	2	0	0	0	41(17)	6
17	Kian Leavy	9(1)	1	3(1)	0	0	0	0	0	12(2)	1
18	Ben McCormack	22(14)	1	2(2)	0	2(1)	0	0	0	26(17)	1
19	Alex Nolan	8(7)	0	5(5)	0	0	0	0	0	13(12)	0
20	Jake Mulraney	29(7)	6	5(2)	0	2	0	0	0	36(9)	6
21	Axel Sjöberg	7(2)	0	0	0	0	0	0	0	7(2)	0
22	Sam Curtis	34	2	3	0	2	0	0	0	39	2
23	Ryan McLaughlin	2(1)	0	2	0	0	0	0	0	4(1)	0
24	Adam Murphy	29(12)	1	4(1)	1	2(1)	1	1(1)	0	36(15)	3
25	Thijs Timmermans	18(12)	0	1(1)	0	1	0	1	0	21(13)	0
26	Jay McGrath	27(6)	1	4(1)	0	1	0	0	0	32(7)	1
28	Rhys Bartley	1(1)	0	0	0	0	0	0	0	1(1)	0
29	Matt Boylan	0	0	0	0	0	0	0	0	0	0
32	Darius Lipsiuc	0	0	0	0	0	0	1(1)	0	1(1)	0
33	Sean McHale	0	0	0	0	0	0	1	0	1	0
34	Dan McHale	0	0	0	0	0	0	1	0	1	0
35	Anthony Dodd	1(1)	0	0	0	0	0	0	0	1(1)	0
36	Dean Lyness	31	0	5	0	2	0	0	0	38	0
38	Jason Folarin Oyenuga	0	0	0	0	0	0	1	0	1	0
39	Luke O'Brien	0	0	0	0	0	0	1	0	1	0
40	Darragh Mooney	0	0	0	0	0	0	0	0	0	0
41	Mason Melia	10(9)	2	2(2)	0	0	0	1(1)	1	13(12)	3
44	James Byrne	0	0	0	0	0	0	1(1)	0	1(1)	0
–	Jamie Gray	0	0	0	0	0	0	1	0	1	0
–	Evan Harte	0	0	0	0	0	0	1	0	1	0
–	Darragh Dunne	0	0	0	0	0	0	1(1)	0	1(1)	0
Players that left during the season
2	Noah Lewis	17(3)	2	0	0	1(1)	0	0	0	18(4)	2
7	Serge Atakayi	10(9)	0	0	0	0	0	0	0	10(9)	0
9	Eoin Doyle	21(9)	4	0	0	1(1)	0	0	0	22(10)	4
17	Vladislav Kreida	11(2)	0	0	0	0	0	0	0	11(2)	0
23	David Odumosu	5	0	0	0	0	0	0	0	5	0

==== Top scorers ====
Includes all competitive matches. Last updated 14 November 2023

Number	Name	SSE Airtricity League	FAI Cup	UEFA Europa Conference League	Leinster Senior Cup	Total
8	Chris Forrester	13	2	0	0	15
14	Mark Doyle	7	2	1	0	10
10	Tommy Lonergan	4	2	0	0	6
15	Conor Carty	5	1	0	0	6
20	Jake Mulraney	6	0	0	0	6
11	Jason McClelland	4	0	0	0	4
9	Eoin Doyle	4	0	0	0	4
41	Mason Melia	2	0	0	1	3
4	Joe Redmond	3	0	0	0	3
22	Sam Curtis	3	0	0	0	3
24	Adam Murphy	1	1	1	0	3
2	Noah Lewis	2	0	0	0	2
17	Kian Leavy	1	0	0	0	1
26	Jay McGrath	1	0	0	0	1
18	Ben McCormack	1	0	0	0	1
6	Jamie Lennon	1	0	0	0	1
N/A	Own Goal	1	0	1	0	2

==== Top assists ====
Includes all competitive matches. Last updated 14 November 2023

Number	Name	SSE Airtricity League	FAI Cup	UEFA Europa Conference League	Leinster Senior Cup	Total
20	Jake Mulraney	6	3	0	0	9
6	Jamie Lennon	5	0	0	0	5
8	Chris Forrester	4	0	0	0	4
18	Ben McCormack	4	0	0	0	4
24	Adam Murphy	3	0	0	1	4
10	Tommy Lonergan	2	1	0	0	3
26	Jay McGrath	2	0	1	0	3
11	Jason McClelland	3	0	0	0	3
23	Ryan McLaughlin	0	2	0	0	2
4	Joe Redmond	2	0	0	0	2
15	Conor Carty	1	1	0	0	2
3	Anthony Breslin	2	0	0	0	2
17	Vladislav Kreida	2	0	0	0	2
22	Sam Curtis	1	0	0	0	1
36	Dean Lyness	1	0	0	0	1
14	Mark Doyle	1	0	0	0	1
25	Thijs Timmermans	1	0	0	0	1
41	Mason Melia	1	0	0	0	1
5	Tom Grivosti	1	0	0	0	1
2	Noah Lewis	1	0	0	0	1

==== Top clean sheets ====
Includes all competitive matches. Last updated 14 November 2023

Number	Name	SSE Airtricity League	FAI Cup	UEFA Europa Conference League	Leinster Senior Cup	Total
1	Danny Rogers	0/0	0/0	0/0	0/1	0/1
23	David Odumosu	1/5	0/0	0/0	0/0	1/5
29	Matt Boylan	0/0	0/0	0/0	0/0	0/0
36	Dean Lyness	12/31	2/5	0/2	0/0	14/38
40	Darragh Mooney	0/0	0/0	0/0	0/0	0/0

==== Disciplinary record ====
Last updated 14 November 2023

Number	Name	SSE Airtricity League		FAI Cup		UEFA Europa Conference League		Leinster Senior Cup		Total	
Number	Name	Yellow card	Red card	Yellow card	Red card	Yellow card	Red card	Yellow card	Red card	Yellow card	Red card
6	Jamie Lennon	11	1	1	0	1	0	0	0	13	1
26	Jay McGrath	8	1	1	0	0	0	0	0	9	1
22	Sam Curtis	7	1	2	0	0	0	0	0	9	1
20	Jake Mulraney	4	2	0	0	0	0	0	0	4	2
24	Adam Murphy	6	0	0	0	0	0	0	0	6	0
10	Tommy Lonergan	3	1	2	0	0	0	0	0	5	1
8	Chris Forrester	5	0	0	0	0	0	0	0	5	0
15	Conor Carty	4	0	0	0	1	0	0	0	5	0
13	David Norman Jr.	1	0	2	0	1	0	0	0	4	0
3	Anthony Breslin	3	0	1	0	0	0	0	0	4	0
2	Noah Lewis	4	0	0	0	0	0	0	0	4	0
17	Vladislav Kreida	4	0	0	0	0	0	0	0	4	0
9	Eoin Doyle	2	1	0	0	0	0	0	0	2	1
14	Mark Doyle	3	0	0	0	0	0	0	0	3	0
25	Thijs Timmermans	3	0	0	0	0	0	0	0	3	0
18	Ben McCormack	3	0	0	0	0	0	0	0	3	0
4	Joe Redmond	3	0	0	0	0	0	0	0	3	0
21	Axel Sjöberg	2	0	0	0	0	0	0	0	2	0
5	Tom Grivosti	2	0	0	0	0	0	0	0	2	0
19	Alex Nolan	1	0	0	0	0	0	0	0	1	0
36	Dean Lyness	0	0	1	0	0	0	0	0	1	0
41	Mason Melia	1	0	0	0	0	0	0	0	1	0
11	Jason McClelland	1	0	0	0	0	0	0	0	1	0
23	David Odumosu	1	0	0	0	0	0	0	0	1	0
–	Sean McHale	0	0	0	0	0	0	1	0	1	0
–	Darragh Dunne	0	0	0	0	0	0	1	0	1	0
Totals		80	7	10	0	3	0	2	0	95	7

==== Captains ====
No.	P	Name	Country	No. games	Notes
4	DF	Joe Redmond	(Republic of Ireland)	24	Captain
8	MF	Chris Forrester	(Republic of Ireland)	16	Vice-captain
3	MF	Anthony Breslin	(Republic of Ireland)	4	

Last updated: 14 November 2023
Source: Competitive match reports.
Competitive matches only
Matches started as captain only
Country: FIFA nationality; No.: Squad number; P: Position; Name: Player name; No. Games: Number of games started as captain.

== Club ==
=== Coaching staff ===
- First-team manager: Tim Clancy (until 2 May)
  Jon Daly (from 2 May)
- Assistant manager: Jon Daly (until 2 May)
  Graham Kelly (from 2 May)
- Technical director: Alan Mathews
- Director of Football: Ger O'Brien
- Coach: Seán O'Connor
- Opposition Analyst: Graham Kelly (until 2 May)
  Ger O'Brien (from 2 May)
- Goalkeeping coach: Pat Jennings
- Athletic Therapist: David Mugalu
- Strength and conditioning Coach: Seán O'Reilly
- Head of Performance: Paul McGrath
- Head of Medical: Sam Rice
- Club Doctor: Eoin Godkin
- Masseuse: Christy O'Neill
- Equipment Manager: David McGill
- Academy Director: Ger O'Brien
- Assistant Academy Director: Jamie Moore
- Head of Academy Medical: David Mugalu
- Head of Academy Recruitment: Ian Cully
- Head of Academy Data: Phil Power
- Under 19s Manager: Seán O'Connor
- Under 19s Assistant Manager: Niall Cully
- Under 19s Coach: Paul Webb
- Under 17s Manager: John Donohue
- Under 15s Manager: Alan Brady
- Under 15s Assistant Manager: Willie Tyrell
- Under 15s Coach: Ciarán Creagh
- Under 15s Goalkeeping Coach: Jamie Quinn
- Under 14s Manager: Mark Connolly
- Under 14s Assistant Manager: Terry Carroll
- Under 14s Coach: Dan Tannim
- Under 14s Goalkeeping Coach: Alex Regan

=== Kit ===
Supplier: Umbro
Sponsor(s): Manguard Plus (Front of Jersey)
McCarthy Insurance Group (Back of Jersey - Top)
Clune Construction Company (Back of Jersey - Bottom)
Bill Griffin Motors (Sleeves of Jersey)

Home	Away	Third	Pre-season Home	Pre-season Away

The club released new Home, Away & Third kits for the season.

Type	Shirt	Shorts	Socks	Info
Home	Red/White Sleeves	White	Red/White	Worn 23 times; against Wexford (LSC) (H), Derry City (LOI) (H), Bohemians (LOI) (H), Shamrock Rovers (LOI) (A), UCD (LOI) (H), Shamrock Rovers (LOI) (H), Sligo Rovers (LOI) (H), Shamrock Rovers (LOI) (A), Dundalk (LOI) (H), UCD (LOI) (A), Derry City (LOI) (H), UCD, Cork City (LOI) (H), F91 Dudelange (UEC) (A), F91 Dudelange (UEC) (H), Cliftonville (FRN) (H), Bohemians (LOI) (H), UCD (LOI) (A), Finn Harps (FAI) (A), Dundalk (LOI) (H), Drogheda United (LOI) (H), Sligo Rovers (LOI) (H), Shamrock Rovers (LOI) (H)
Away	Navy	Navy	Navy	Worn 9 times; against Shelbourne (LOI) (H), Dundalk (LOI) (A), Sligo Rovers (LOI) (A), Derry City (LOI) (A), Shelbourne (LOI) (H), Dundalk (LOI) (A), Sligo Rovers (LOI) (A), Derry City (FAI) (A), Derry City (LOI) (A)
Third	Yellow	Black	Yellow	Worn 11 times; against Drogheda United (LOI) (A), Bohemians (LOI) (A), Cork City (LOI) (A), Shelbourne (LOI) (A), Drogheda United (LOI) (A), Longford Town (FAI) (A), Shelbourne (LOI) (A), Cork City (LOI) (A), Cork City (FAI) (A), Bohemians (LOI) (A), Bohemians (FAI) (N)
Pre-season Home	Red/White Sleeves	White	Red	Worn 5 times; against Drogheda United (FRN) (N), Bohemians (FRN) (N), Bray Wanderers (FRN) (N), Sligo Rovers (FRN) (H), Waterford (FRN) (A)
Pre-season Away	White/Navy Sleeves	Navy	Navy	Worn 1 time; against Galway United (FRN) (N)

Key:
LOI=League of Ireland Premier Division
FAI=FAI Cup
UEC=UEFA Europa Conference League
LSC=Leinster Senior Cup
FRN=Friendly

== Competitions ==
=== League of Ireland ===
==== League table ====
Pos	Team	Pld	W	D	L	GF	GA	GD	Pts	Qualification or relegation
1	Shamrock Rovers (C)	36	20	12	4	67	27	+40	72	Qualification for Champions League first qualifying round
2	Derry City	36	18	11	7	57	24	+33	65	Qualification for Conference League first qualifying round
3	St Patrick's Athletic	36	19	5	12	59	42	+17	62	Qualification for Conference League second qualifying round (Note: The 2023 FAI Cup winners qualified for the Conference League second qualifying round. Since the cup winners (St Patrick's Athletic) qualified based on league position, the second Conference League first qualifying round spot was passed to the fourth-placed team.)
4	Shelbourne	36	15	15	6	44	27	+17	60	Qualification for Conference League first qualifying round
5	Dundalk	36	17	7	12	59	44	+15	58	
6	Bohemians	36	16	10	10	53	40	+13	58	
7	Drogheda United	36	10	11	15	40	54	−14	41	
8	Sligo Rovers	36	10	7	19	36	51	−15	37	
9	Cork City (R)	36	8	7	21	35	64	−29	31	Qualification for play-off final
10	UCD (R)	36	2	5	29	19	96	−77	11	Relegation to League of Ireland First Division

Source: SSE Airtricity League,
Rules for classification: 1) Points; 2) Goal difference; 3) Goals scored.
(C) Champions; (R) Relegated

==== Results summary ====
Overall								Home						Away					
Pld	W	D	L	GF	GA	GD	Pts	W	D	L	GF	GA	GD	W	D	L	GF	GA	GD
36	19	5	12	59	42	+17	62	10	3	5	32	14	+18	9	2	7	27	28	−1

Last updated: 4 November 2023.

==== Results by round ====
Round	1	2	3	4	5	6	7	8	9	10	11	12	13	14	15	16	17	18	19	20	21	22	23	24	25	26	27	28	29	30	31	32	33	34	35	36
Ground	H	H	A	A	H	A	H	H	A	A	H	A	H	A	H	A	A	H	A	H	A	H	A	H	H	A	H	A	A	H	H	A	A	H	H	A
Result	D	W	L	L	L	D	W	W	W	W	L	L	L	W	W	L	W	W	W	W	L	W	D	W	D	W	D	W	L	W	L	W	W	W	L	L
Position	2	4	7	8	9	9	8	7	4	2	4	5	7	6	6	6	4	4	4	3	3	3	3	2	2	2	2	2	3	3	3	3	3	2	3	3

Updated to match(es) played on 4 November 2023. Source: 2023 League of Ireland Premier Division
A = Away; H = Home; W = Win; D = Draw; L = Loss

==== Matches ====
Win Draw Loss

17 February 2023 1	St Patrick's Athletic	1–1	Derry City	Inchicore, Dublin 8
19:45 GMT	Chris Forrester (yellow card) 31'; Noah Lewis (yellow card) 72'; Jamie Lennon (yellow card) 76'; Joe Redmond 89'	Report	Jordan McEneff 32'; Will Patching (yellow card) 79'; Ronan Boyce (yellow card) 84'; Patrick McEleney (yellow card) 87'	Stadium: Richmond Park; Attendance: 4,789; Referee: Rob Harvey

24 February 2023 2	St Patrick's Athletic	1–0	Shelbourne	Inchicore, Dublin 8
19:45 GMT	Eoin Doyle 84'; Vladislav Kreida (yellow card) 87'; David Odumosu (yellow card) 90+4'	Report	Tyreke Wilson (yellow card) 41'	Stadium: Richmond Park; Attendance: 4,930; Referee: Neil Doyle

3 March 2023 3	Dundalk	5–0	St Patrick's Athletic	Dundalk, County Louth
19:45 GMT	Patrick Hoban 6'; Louie Annesley 15'; Rayhaan Tulloch (yellow card) 45'; Rayhaan Tulloch 51'; Daniel Kelly 53'; Daniel Kelly (yellow card) 53'; Connor Malley 84'	Report	Sam Curtis (yellow card) 45'; Vladislav Kreida (yellow card) 55'; Eoin Doyle (yellow card) 56'; Chris Forrester (yellow card) 90+1'	Stadium: Oriel Park; Attendance: 3,487; Referee: Paul McLaughlin

6 March 2022 4	Sligo Rovers	2–1	St Patrick's Athletic	Sligo, County Sligo
19:45 GMT	John Mahon (red card) 20'; Greg Bolger (yellow card) 20'; Reece Hutchinson 32'; Fabrice Hartmann 67'; Kailin Barlow (yellow card) 69'; Fabrice Hartmann (yellow card) 80'	Report	Thijs Timmermans (yellow card) 39'; Sam Curtis (yellow card) 42'; Chris Forrester 62'; Joe Redmond (yellow card) 69'; Conor Carty (yellow card) 88'	Stadium: The Showgrounds; Attendance: 2,751; Referee: Rob Hennessy

10 March 2023 5	St Patrick's Athletic	0–2	Bohemians	Inchicore, Dublin 8
19:45 GMT	Joe Redmond (yellow card) 24'; Jay McGrath (yellow card) 31'; Jamie Lennon (yellow card) 52'; Jamie Lennon (yellow card) 72' (yellow-red card); Sam Curtis (yellow card) 74'	Report	Jonathan Afolabi 18'; Paddy Kirk (yellow card) 53'; Dean Williams 90+3'	Stadium: Richmond Park; Attendance: 5,002; Referee: Neil Doyle

17 March 2023 6	Shamrock Rovers	2–2	St Patrick's Athletic	Tallaght, Dublin 24
17:00 GMT	Richie Towell 20'; Neil Farrugia (yellow card) 27'; Richie Towell (yellow card) 41'; Jack Byrne 54'; Sean Gannon (yellow card) 90+1'	Report	Eoin Doyle 42' (pen.); Noah Lewis (yellow card) 70'; Jay McGrath (yellow card) 77'; Adam Murphy (yellow card) 82'; Jake Mulraney 88'; Vladislav Kreida (yellow card) 90+2'	Stadium: Tallaght Stadium; Attendance: 7,674; Referee: Damien McGrath

31 March 2023 7	St Patrick's Athletic	3–0	UCD	Inchicore, Dublin 8
19:45 GMT	Chris Forrester 16'; Jake Mulraney 38'; Chris Forrester 52'	Report	Dara Keane (yellow card) 57'; Jack Keaney (yellow card) 78'; Donal Higgins (yellow card) 89'	Stadium: Richmond Park; Attendance: 3,411; Referee: Sean Grant

7 April 2023 8	St Patrick's Athletic	4–0	Cork City	Inchicore, Dublin 8
19:45 GMT	Jake Mulraney 15'; Jason McClelland 64'; Jamie Lennon 76'; Adam Murphy (yellow card) 86'; Mark Doyle 90'	Report	Aaron Bolger (yellow card) 40'; Cian Murphy (yellow card) 65'	Stadium: Richmond Park; Attendance: 3,689; Referee: Rob Hennessey

10 April 2023 9	Drogheda United	1–3	St Patrick's Athletic	Drogheda, County Louth
19:45 GMT	Ryan Brennan (yellow card) 19'; Dylan Grimes (yellow card) 23'; Gary Deegan (yellow card) 43'; Conor Keeley (yellow card) 87'	Report	Chris Forrester 19' (pen.); Joe Redmond (yellow card) 25'; Chris Forrester 34'; Eoin Doyle 90+5'	Stadium: Weavers Park; Attendance: 2,225; Referee: Kevin O'Sullivan

14 April 2023 10	Bohemians	2–3	St Patrick's Athletic	Phibsborough, Dublin 7
19:45 GMT	Adam McDonnell 15'; Jordan Flores (red card) 45'; Dean Williams 65'; Dylan Connolly (yellow card) 69'	Report	Chris Forrester 20'; Jason McClelland 24'; Mark Doyle 31'; Jason McClelland (yellow card) 39'; Noah Lewis (yellow card) 45+4'; Tommy Lonergan (yellow card) 90+1'; Tommy Lonergan (yellow card) 90+3' (yellow-red card); Vladislav Kreida (yellow card) 90+4'	Stadium: Dalymount Park; Attendance: 4,428; Referee: Paul McLaughlin

21 April 2023 11	St Patrick's Athletic	0–2	Shamrock Rovers	Inchicore, Dublin 8
19:45 GMT	Adam Murphy (yellow card) 59'	Report	Daniel Cleary (yellow card) 16'; Johnny Kenny 20'; Trevor Clarke (yellow card) 33'; Gary O'Neill (yellow card) 51'; Graham Burke (yellow card) 61'; Trevor Clarke 69'; Neil Farrugia (yellow card) 88'	Stadium: Richmond Park; Attendance: 5,011; Referee: Rob Hennessey

28 April 2023 12	Derry City	2–0	St Patrick's Athletic	Derry, Northern Ireland
19:45 GMT	Ben Doherty (yellow card) 61'; Ben Doherty 71' (pen.); Colm Whelan 79'; Ollie O'Neill (yellow card) 80'	Report	Axel Sjöberg (yellow card) 56'; Noah Lewis (yellow card) 70'	Stadium: Ryan McBride Brandywell Stadium; Attendance: 3,054; Referee: Paul McLaughlin

1 May 2023 13	St Patrick's Athletic	0–1	Sligo Rovers	Inchicore, Dublin 8
15:00 GMT	Conor Carty (yellow card) 23'; Chris Forrester (yellow card) 86'; Eoin Doyle (red card) 90'; Jay McGrath (yellow card) 90+6'	Report	Johan Brannefalk (yellow card) 31'; Max Mata 56'; Lucas Browning-Lagerfeldt (yellow card) 72'; David Cawley (yellow card) 81'; Luke McNicholas (yellow card) 82'; Will Fitzgerald (yellow card) 86'; John Mahon (yellow card) 90+6'	Stadium: Richmond Park; Attendance: 4,265; Referee: Neil Doyle

5 May 2023 14	Cork City	2–3	St Patrick's Athletic	Turners Cross, County Cork
19:45 GMT	Tunde Owolabi 15'; Joe O'Brien-Whitmarsh 20'; Josh Holohan (yellow card) 36'; Tunde Owolabi (yellow card) 73'; Joe O'Brien-Whitmarsh (yellow card) 87'	Report	Conor Carty 6'; Anthony Breslin (yellow card) 13'; Jake Mulraney 55'; Jamie Lennon (yellow card) 64'; Adam Murphy (yellow card) 69'; Adam Murphy 80'	Stadium: Turners Cross; Attendance: 3,211; Referee: Eoghan O'Shea

12 May 2023 15	St Patrick's Athletic	3–0	Drogheda United	Inchicore, Dublin 8
19:45 GMT	Tom Grivosti (yellow card) 53'; Jason McClelland 82'; Chris Forrester 90'; Chris Forrester 90+2'	Report	Aaron McNally (yellow card) 30'; Luke Heeney (yellow card) 67'	Stadium: Richmond Park; Attendance: 4,011; Referee: Sean Grant

15 May 2023 16	Shamrock Rovers	3–2	St Patrick's Athletic	Tallaght, Dublin 24
20:00 GMT	Lee Grace 45+2'; Richie Towell 67'; Gary O'Neill (yellow card) 78'; Richie Towell 88' (pen.)	Report	Mark Doyle 27'; Sam Curtis (yellow card) 59'; Ben McCormack (yellow card) 83'; Tom Grivosti (yellow card) 87'; Ben McCormack 88'	Stadium: Tallaght Stadium; Attendance: 6,212; Referee: Damien McGraith

19 May 2023 17	Shelbourne	0–1	St Patrick's Athletic	Drumcondra, Dublin 3
19:45 GMT	Jad Hakiki (yellow card) 68'; John Ross Wilson (yellow card) 73'; Matty Smith (yellow card) 90+5'	Report	Sam Curtis 56'; Jamie Lennon (yellow card) 72'; Axel Sjöberg (yellow card) 76'; Thijs Timmermans (yellow card) 90+5'	Stadium: Tolka Park; Attendance: 3,946; Referee: Paul McLaughlin
Note: Live on Virgin Media Two

26 May 2023 18	St Patrick's Athletic	2–1	Dundalk	Inchicore, Dublin 8
19:45 GMT	Jamie Lennon (yellow card) 28'; Mark Doyle 31'; Jake Mulraney (red card) 54'; Mark Doyle (yellow card) 54'; Conor Carty 81'	Report	Paul Doyle (yellow card) 29'; Rayhaan Tulloch 48'; Connor Malley (yellow card) 54'; Wasiri Williams (yellow card) 72'; Alfie Lewis (yellow card) 90'	Stadium: Richmond Park; Attendance: 4,089; Referee: Ray Matthews

2 June 2023 19	UCD	1–3	St Patrick's Athletic	Belfield, Dublin 4
19:45 GMT	Danny Norris (yellow card) 35'; Dani Kinsella Bishop 86'	Report	Conor Carty 7'; Noah Lewis 42'; Noah Lewis 63'	Stadium: UCD Bowl; Attendance: 1,129; Referee: Gavin Colfer

5 June 2023 20	St Patrick's Athletic	4–1	Derry City	Inchicore, Dublin 8
18:45 GMT	Jay McGrath 34'; Adam Murphy (yellow card) 61'; Eoin Doyle 62'; Chris Forrester 67'; Mark Doyle 79'	Report	Shane McEleney (yellow card) 41'; Cian Kavanagh 65'; Ryan Graydon (yellow card) 83'	Stadium: Richmond Park; Attendance: 4,005; Referee: Neil Doyle
Note: Live on Virgin Media Two

9 June 2023 21	Drogheda United	2–1	St Patrick's Athletic	Drogheda, County Louth
19:45 GMT	Adam Foley 18'; Freddie Draper (yellow card) 40'; Emmanuel Adegboyega (yellow card) 47'; Adam Foley (yellow card) 60'; Evan Weir (yellow card) 90+4'; Darragh Markey 90+5'	Report	Chris Forrester 45' (pen.); Ben McCormack (yellow card) 77'; Eoin Doyle (yellow card) 85'	Stadium: Weavers Park; Attendance: 1,888; Referee: Paul McLaughlin

23 June 2022 22	St Patrick's Athletic	1–0	Shelbourne	Inchicore, Dublin 8
19:45 GMT	Ben McCormack (yellow card) 41'; Jake Mulraney (yellow card) 48'; Sam Curtis (yellow card) 56'; Jake Mulraney 68'; Mark Doyle (yellow card) 88'	Report	Shane Griffin (yellow card) 51'; Seán Boyd (yellow card) 56'; Tyreke Wilson (yellow card) 56'; Mark Coyle (yellow card) 56'; Gbemi Arubi (yellow card) 62'	Stadium: Richmond Park; Attendance: 4,754; Referee: Rob Hennessey

26 June 2023 23	Dundalk	1–1	St Patrick's Athletic	Dundalk, County Louth
19:45 GMT	Rayhaan Tulloch (yellow card) 53'; Robbie McCourt (yellow card) 53'; Rayhaan Tulloch (yellow card) 55' (yellow-red card); Daniel Kelly 84'; Daniel Kelly (yellow card) 90+2'; Patrick Hoban (yellow card) 90+5'	Report	Jamie Lennon (yellow card) 17'; Conor Carty 33'; Chris Forrester (yellow card) 66'; Thijs Timmermans (yellow card) 90+3'	Stadium: Oriel Park; Attendance: 2,371; Referee: Damien McGraith

30 June 2023 24	St Patrick's Athletic	7–0	UCD	Inchicore, Dublin 8
19:45 GMT	Chris Forrester 13' (pen.); Michael Gallagher 45' (o.g.); Sam Curtis 47'; Tommy Lonergan 65'; Jason McClelland 69'; Mason Melia 71'; Tommy Lonergan 75'	Report	Brendan Barr (yellow card) 45'	Stadium: Richmond Park; Attendance: 3,537; Referee: Neil Doyle

7 July 2023 25	St Patrick's Athletic	1–1	Cork City	Inchicore, Dublin 8
19:45 GMT	Jake Mulraney (yellow card) 17'; Jamie Lennon (yellow card) 19'; Jake Mulraney 39'	Report	Jonas Häkkinen (yellow card) 9'; Ruairí Keating (yellow card) 58'; Ruairí Keating 90+3'	Stadium: Richmond Park; Attendance: 3,945; Referee: David Dunne

4 August 2023 26	Sligo Rovers	0–2	St Patrick's Athletic	Sligo, County Sligo
19:45 GMT	Niall Moravian (yellow card) 37'; Greg Bolger (yellow card) 54'; Johan Brannefalk (yellow card) 75'; Fabrice Hartmann (yellow card) 88'; David Cawley (penalty missed) 90+3'	Report	Chris Forrester 12' (pen.); Sam Curtis 32'; Conor Carty (yellow card) 37'; Jay McGrath (yellow card) 80'	Stadium: The Showgrounds; Attendance: 2,124; Referee: Rob Harvey
Note: Live on RTÉ Two

11 August 2023 27	St Patrick's Athletic	0–0	Bohemians	Inchicore, Dublin 8
19:45 GMT	Jay McGrath (yellow card) 14'; Anthony Breslin (yellow card) 25'; Adam Murphy (yellow card) 33'; Mason Melia (yellow card) 90'	Report	Adam McDonnell (yellow card) 53'; Paddy Kirk (yellow card) 59'; Jordan Flores (yellow card) 90+2'	Stadium: Richmond Park; Attendance: 5,011; Referee: Rob Harvey
Note: Live on RTÉ Two

25 August 2023 28	UCD	0–1	St Patrick's Athletic	Belfield, Dublin 4
19:45 GMT	Donal Higgins (yellow card) 84'; Harvey O'Brien (yellow card) 88'	Report	Joe Redmond 43'	Stadium: UCD Bowl; Attendance: 1,265; Referee: Kevin O'Sullivan

1 September 2023 29	Shelbourne	2–1	St Patrick's Athletic	Drumcondra, Dublin 3
19:45 GMT	Mark Coyle (yellow card) 31'; Paddy Barrett (yellow card) 36'; Euclides Cabral 80'; Paddy Barrett 90'; Harry Wood (yellow card) 90+4'	Report	Joe Redmond 22'; Jay McGrath (yellow card) 24'; Anthony Breslin (yellow card) 35'; Jamie Lennon (yellow card) 55'; Jay McGrath (yellow card) 65' (yellow-red card)	Stadium: Tolka Park; Attendance: 4,320; Referee: Neil Doyle

22 September 2023 30	St Patrick's Athletic	3–1	Dundalk	Inchicore, Dublin 8
19:45 GMT	Tommy Lonergan 49'; Tommy Lonergan 57'; Conor Carty (yellow card) 70'; Mark Doyle (yellow card) 90'; Mason Melia 90+8'	Report	Archie Davies (yellow card) 18'; Hayden Muller (yellow card) 54'; Robbie Benson (yellow card) 61'; Daniel Kelly 75'; Robbie Benson (yellow card) 83' (yellow-red card)	Stadium: Richmond Park; Attendance: 3,921; Referee: Damien McGraith
Note: Live on Virgin Media Two

25 September 2023 31	St Patrick's Athletic	1–2	Drogheda United	Inchicore, Dublin 8
19:45 GMT	Chris Forrester 40'; Jake Mulraney (yellow card) 53'; Jake Mulraney (yellow card) 66' (yellow-red card); Chris Forrester (yellow card) 90+5'; Sam Curtis (red card) 90+6'	Report	Warren Davis 7'; Kyle Robinson (yellow card) 21'; Luke Heeney (yellow card) 35'; Ryan Brennan (yellow card) 75'; Dayle Rooney 82'	Stadium: Richmond Park; Attendance: 3,711; Referee: David Dunne
Note: Fixture was originally set for 15 September but was moved due to both club's participation in the FAI Cup Quarter Finals.

29 September 2023 32	Cork City	0–1	St Patrick's Athletic	Turners Cross, County Cork
19:45 GMT	John O'Donovan (yellow card) 9'; John O'Donovan (yellow card) 61' (yellow-red card); Conor Drinan (yellow card) 70'; Aaron Bolger (yellow card) 80'; Ruairí Keating (yellow card) 90+3'	Report	Mark Doyle 77'; Jamie Lennon (yellow card) 90+4'	Stadium: Turners Cross; Attendance: 2,251; Referee: Oliver Moran

20 October 2023 33	Bohemians	0–2	St Patrick's Athletic	Phibsborough, Dublin 7
19:45 GMT	Adam McDonnell (yellow card) 31'; Paddy Kirk (yellow card) 63'	Report	David Norman (yellow card) 25'; Sam Curtis (yellow card) 40'; Jamie Lennon (yellow card) 41'; Mark Doyle 59'; Conor Carty 82'; Alex Nolan (yellow card) 90+5'	Stadium: Dalymount Park; Attendance: 4,084; Referee: Damien MacGraith

23 October 2023 34	St Patrick's Athletic	1–0	Sligo Rovers	Inchicore, Dublin 8
19:30 GMT	Kian Leavy 37'; Sam Curtis (yellow card) 60'	Report	Johan Brannefalk (yellow card) 24'; Fabrice Hartmann (yellow card) 40'; Niall Morahan (yellow card) 62'; David Cawley (yellow card) 66'; Nando Pijnaker (yellow card) 85'	Stadium: Richmond Park; Attendance: 3,117; Referee: Eoghan O'Shea
Note: Fixture was originally set for 6 October but was moved due to St Patrick's Athletic's participation in the FAI Cup Semi Finals.

27 October 2023 35	St Patrick's Athletic	0–2	Shamrock Rovers	Inchicore, Dublin 8
20:00 GMT	Tommy Lonergan (yellow card) 40'	Report	Ronan Finn (yellow card) 25'; Markus Poom (yellow card) 30'; Dylan Watts (yellow card) 80'; Seán Kavanagh 84'; Richie Towell (yellow card) 88'; Graham Burke 90+2'; Seán Kavanagh (yellow card) 90+7'	Stadium: Richmond Park; Attendance: 5,022; Referee: Neil Doyle
Note: Live on RTÉ Two

3 November 2023 36	Derry City	3–0	St Patrick's Athletic	Derry, Northern Ireland
19:45 GMT	Brandon Kavanagh 11'; Will Patching 26'; Mark Connolly (yellow card) 30'; Cameron Dummigan (yellow card) 73'; Jordan McEneff 86'	Report	Jay McGrath (yellow card) 85'	Stadium: Ryan McBride Brandywell Stadium; Attendance: 3,000 (Est.); Referee: Rob Harvey

=== FAI Cup ===
Win Draw Loss

==== First round ====
23 July 2023 First Round	Longford Town	1–2	St Patrick's Athletic	Mullolagher, County Longford
18:00	Viktor Serdeniuk (yellow card) 23'; James Doona (yellow card) 58'; Mohammed Boudiaf 77'; Dylan Hand (red card) 81'; Jack Brady (red card) 90+2'; Josh Giurgi (yellow card) 90+2'	Report	David Norman (yellow card) 36'; Adam Murphy 63'; Chris Forrester 79' (pen.); Sam Curtis (yellow card) 90+2'	Stadium: Bishopsgate; Attendance: 1,164; Referee: Rob Hennessey

==== Second round ====
20 August 2023 Second Round	Derry City	0–0 (a.e.t.)	St Patrick's Athletic	Derry, Northern Ireland
17:00	Adam O'Reilly (yellow card) 19'; Ben Doherty (yellow card) 87'; Brian Maher (yellow card) FT	Report	Jamie Lennon (yellow card) 81'; Sam Curtis (yellow card) 95'; Tommy Lonergan (yellow card) 103'; Jay McGrath (yellow card) 115'	Stadium: Ryan McBride Brandywell Stadium; Attendance: 3,267; Referee: Neil Doyle
	Penalties
	Patrick McEleney (penalty scored); Brandon Kavanagh (penalty scored); Danny Mullen (penalty scored); Michael Duffy (penalty missed); Mark Connolly (penalty missed)		Chris Forrester (penalty scored); Alex Nolan (penalty scored); Jake Mulraney (penalty missed); Kian Leavy (penalty scored); Mason Melia (penalty scored)

==== Quarter Final ====
15 September 2023 Quarter Final	Finn Harps	1–2	St Patrick's Athletic	Ballybofey, County Donegal
20:00	Sean O'Donnell 23'; Jamie Watson (yellow card) 45+1'; Seamas Keogh (yellow card) 48'; Tony McNamee (yellow card) 51'	Report	Chris Forrester 48' (pen.); Tommy Lonergan 85'	Stadium: Finn Park; Attendance: 1,351; Referee: Rob Harvey

==== Semi Final ====
8 October 2023 Semi Final	Cork City	0–2	St Patrick's Athletic	Turners Cross, County Cork
14:40	Ruairí Keating (yellow card) 78'; Aaron Bolger (yellow card) 87'	Report	Mark Doyle 12'; Anthony Breslin (yellow card) 45+1'; Dean Lyness (yellow card) 81'; Conor Carty 83'	Stadium: Turners Cross; Attendance: 6,335; Referee: Rob Harvey
Note: Live on RTÉ One

==== Final ====
12 November 2023 Final	Bohemians	1–3	St Patrick's Athletic	Ballsbridge, Dublin 4
15:00	Jonathan Afolabi 9' (pen.); James McManus (yellow card) 47'; Bartłomiej Kukułowicz (yellow card) 90+4'	Report	Mark Doyle 23'; Krystian Nowak 48' (o.g.); David Norman (yellow card) 73'; Tommy Lonergan 87'; Tommy Lonergan (yellow card) 87'	Stadium: Aviva Stadium; Attendance: 43,881; Referee: Paul McLaughlin
Note: Live on RTÉ Two

=== UEFA Europa Conference League ===
Win Draw Loss

==== First Qualifying Round ====
12 July 2023 1st leg	F91 Dudelange (Luxembourg)	2–1	(Republic of Ireland) St Patrick's Athletic	Dudelange, Luxembourg
19:30 (Local time)	Oege-Sietse van Lingen 24'; Ismaël Sidibé (yellow card) 30'; Bruno Frere (yellow card) 47'; Sylvio Ouassiero (yellow card) 53'; Yahcuroo Roemer 61'	Report	Jamie Lennon (yellow card) 44'; Conor Carty (yellow card) 56'; David Norman Jr. (yellow card) 64'; Mark Doyle 90+4'	Stadium: Stade Jos Nosbaum; Attendance: 1,469; Referee: Radoslav Gidzhenov ( Bulgaria)

20 July 2023 2nd leg	St Patrick's Athletic (Republic of Ireland)	2–3	(Luxembourg) F91 Dudelange	Dublin, Republic of Ireland
19:45	Didier Desprez 22' (o.g.); Adam Murphy 60'	Report	Oege-Sietse van Lingen 9'; Dylan Kuete (yellow card) 31'; Ismael Sidibe (yellow card) 47'; Oege-Sietse van Lingen 67'; Ismael Sidibe (yellow card) 88' (yellow-red card); Oege-Sietse van Lingen 90+5'	Stadium: Richmond Park; Attendance: 2,534; Referee: Edgars Maļcevs ( Latvia)
Note: Capacity of Richmond Park reduced due to UEFA regulations on standing areas not being used during UEFA Europa League matches.

=== Leinster Senior Cup ===
Win Draw Loss

==== Fourth round ====
31 January 2023 Fourth Round	St Patrick's Athletic	1–3	Wexford	Inchicore, Dublin 8
19:45 GMT	Darragh Dunne (yellow card) 37'; Sean McHale (yellow card) 68'; Mason Melia 90+1'		Jordan Adeyemo 10'; Jordan Adeyemo 12'; Jordan Adeyemo 75'; Brandon McCann (yellow card) 90+1'	Stadium: Richmond Park; Attendance: 800 (Est.); Referee: Paul Norton

=== Friendlies ===
Win Draw Loss

==== Pre-season ====
15 January 2023	St Patrick's Athletic	3–1	Drogheda United	Blanchardstown, Dublin 15
15:00 GMT	Mark Doyle 65'; Tommy Lonergan 71'; Tommy Lonergan 80' (pen.)		Conor Keeley 3'	Stadium: TUD Blanchardstown; Referee: Alan Patchell
Note: Behind Closed Doors

20 January 2023	St Patrick's Athletic	1–1	Galway United	Clonshaugh, Dublin 9
17:00 GMT	Eoin Doyle 52'		Rob Manley 21'	Stadium: AUL; Referee: Adriano Reale
Note: Behind Closed Doors

21 January 2023	Bohemians	3–1	St Patrick's Athletic	Clonshaugh, Dublin 9
14:30 GMT	Tom Grivosti 23' (o.g.); Jonathan Afolabi 24'; James Akintunde 36'		Tommy Lonergan 55'	Stadium: AUL; Referee: Gavin Colfer
Note: Behind Closed Doors

28 January 2023	Bray Wanderers	0–6	St Patrick's Athletic	Clonshaugh, Dublin 9
11:00 GMT		Report	Eoin Doyle 2'; Eoin Doyle 3'; Vladislav Kreida (yellow card) 37'; Jake Mulraney 50'; Ben McCormack 55'; Tommy Lonergan 78'; Jake Mulraney 79'	Stadium: AUL; Referee: Mark Houlihan
Note: Behind Closed Doors

4 February 2023	St Patrick's Athletic	2–0	Sligo Rovers	Inchicore, Dublin 8
17:00 GMT	Jake Mulraney 36'; Jamie Lennon 49'; Sam Curtis (yellow card) 81'			Stadium: Richmond Park; Attendance: 800 (Est.)

11 February 2023	Waterford	0–2	St Patrick's Athletic	Waterford City, County Waterford
14:00 GMT	Dean McMenamy (yellow card) 62'		Sam Curtis 14'; Eoin Doyle 52'	Stadium: RSC; Attendance: 500 (Est.); Referee: Sean Grant

==== Mid-season ====
24 March 2023	Motherwell	0–0	St Patrick's Athletic	Motherwell, Scotland
12:30 GMT				Stadium: Fir Park; Attendance: 0
Note: Behind Closed Doors

29 July 2023	St Patrick's Athletic	0–1	Cliftonville	Dublin, Republic of Ireland
15:00 GMT		Report	Jonny Addis	Stadium: Richmond Park; Attendance: 0
Note: Behind Closed Doors

9 September 2023	St Patrick's Athletic Legends	7–2	League of Ireland Legends	Inchicore, Dublin 8
15:00 GMT	Killian Brennan 7'; Dave Mulcahy 14'; Trevor Molloy 21'; Trevor Molloy 49'; Killian Brennan 50'; Ian Bermingham 76'; Eddie Gormley 77'		Anthony Murphy 25'; Gavin Peers 80'	Stadium: Richmond Park; Attendance: 1,300 (Est.)
Note: Ian Bermingham Testimonial
