= David Odumosu =

Irish footballer (born 2001)

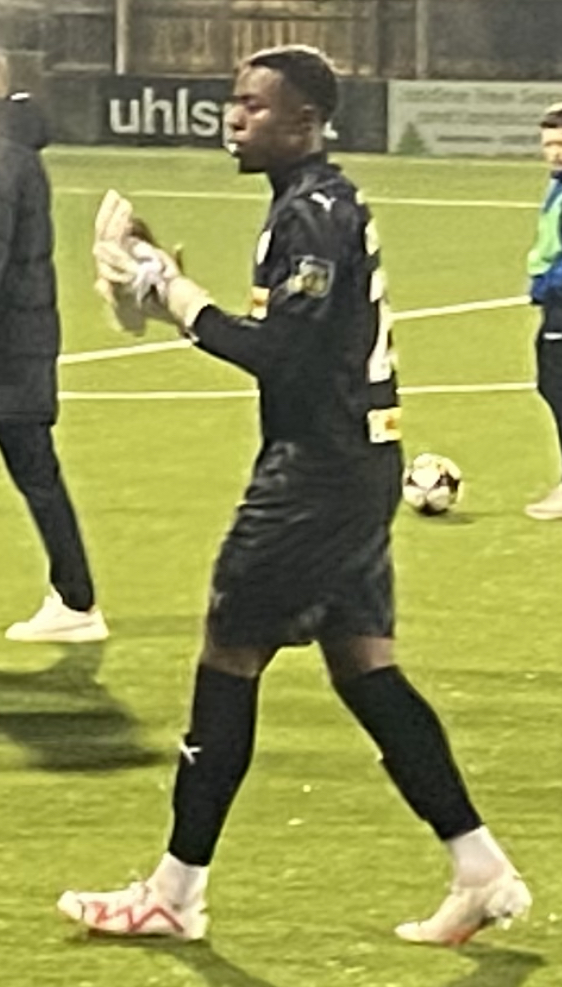
- Odumosu with Cliftonville in 2023

Personal information
- Date of birth: 23 March 2001 (age 25)
- Place of birth: Dundalk, Ireland
- Position: Goalkeeper

Team information
- Current team: Vestri

Youth career
- Glenmuir United
- Bay United
- –2017: Malahide United
- 2017–2019: Dundalk

Senior career*
Years	Team	Apps	(Gls)
2020–2021	Drogheda United	49	(0)
2022–2024	St Patrick's Athletic	7	(0)
2023–2024	→ Cliftonville (loan)	20	(0)
2024–2025	Cliftonville	38	(0)
2025–2026	Cork City	6	(0)
2027–	Vestri	0	(0)

International career^{‡}
2018	Republic of Ireland U18	1	(0)
- * Club domestic league appearances and goals as of 10:52, 13 November 2026 (GMT) ‡ National team caps and goals as of 18:51, 4 July 2023 (GMT)

David Odumosu (born 23 March 2001) is an Irish professional footballer who plays as a goalkeeper for 1. deild karla club Vestri.

== Early life ==
Odumosu was born in Dundalk to Nigerian parents. He attended O'Fiaich College of Further Education, Dundalk.

== Club career ==
=== Youth career ===
Odumosu played with local sides Glenmuir United and Bay United. Originally playing as an outfielder, Odumosu transitioned to a goalkeeper at under-12 level before eventually signing for Malahide United. While at Malahide, Odumosu played alongside Conor Grant and Oisin McEntee. Odumosu trialed in England with West Ham and Everton before signing for his hometown Dundalk as a youth player, where he played at U17 and U19 level.

=== Drogheda United ===
==== 2020 Season ====
Having never made an appearance for Dundalk's senior side, Odumosu made the switch to League of Ireland First Division side Drogheda United under Tim Clancy for the 2020 season. Odumosu would go on to play all 18 matches for Drogheda that season as they went on to be crowned Champions, keeping 6 clean sheets. Odumosu then went on to be named Drogheda Fan's Young Player of the Season while also being shortlisted for the SSE Airtricity/Soccer Writers Ireland Goalkeeper of the Year alongside Alan Mannus (Shamrock Rovers) and Ed McGinty (Sligo Rovers).

==== 2021 Season ====
Having spent a month on trial with Watford, Odumosu would resign with Drogheda for the following 2021 season in the Premier Division. Odumosu would make 31 appearances that season keeping 7 clean sheets as Drogheda finished 7th.

=== St Patrick's Athletic ===
==== 2022 Season ====
After trialing with Bolton Wanderers, Odumosu signed for St Patrick's Athletic for the 2022 season to provide competition for West Ham United loanee Joseph Anang. Upon Anang returning to West Ham that summer, Odumosu would suffer an ankle injury leading to Clancy signing Danny Rogers.

==== 2023 season ====
Odumosu extended his contract with the club ahead of the 2023 season. He would go on to be first choice goalkeeper for the beginning of the season, however newly signed goalkeeper Dean Lyness become first choice from the 6th game of the season onwards.

=== Cliftonville ===
On 6 July 2023, Cliftonville announced the signing of Odumosu on loan from St Patrick's Athletic to provide competition to first-choice keeper Nathan Gartside. He was the first signing under Jim Magilton, who had admired him as a player while working as sporting director at Dundalk. He made his debut for the club on 5 September 2023, in a 3–2 loss away to Carrick Rangers in the County Antrim Shield. On 30 January 2024, it was announced that Odumosu had joined the club on a permanent basis as part of the deal that saw Luke Turner join St Patrick's Athletic for an undisclosed fee. He departed the club in July 2025, having kept 28 clean sheets in his 74 appearances in all competitions for them.

=== Cork City ===
On 3 July 2025, Odumosu returned to the League of Ireland Premier Division, signing for bottom of the table Cork City for an undisclosed fee. In November 2026, it was announced that Odumosu had left the club following the end of his contract after making just 6 appearances in his 18 months there.

=== Vestri ===
On 13 November 2026, it was announced that Odumosu had signed for Vestri in Iceland's second tier ahead of the 2027 season.

== International career ==
Odumosu made his first international appearance under Andy Reid at under 18 level against Scotland U18. Odumosu would also end up being called up at under 21 level without ever making it off the bench. Odumosu also represented the Republic of Ireland School Selects team. Odumosu has expressed interest in representing the Nigeria under 23 squad.

== Career statistics ==
As of match played 2 October 2026

Appearances and goals by club, season and competition
Club	Season	League			National Cup		League Cup		Europe		Other		Total	
Club	Season	Division	Apps	Goals	Apps	Goals	Apps	Goals	Apps	Goals	Apps	Goals	Apps	Goals
Drogheda United	2020	LOI First Division	18	0	0	0	—		—		—		18	0
Drogheda United	2021	LOI Premier Division	31	0	0	0	—		—		—		31	0
Drogheda United	Total		49	0	0	0	—		—		—		49	0
St Patrick's Athletic	2022	LOI Premier Division	2	0	0	0	—		0 (Note: Appearance(s) in the UEFA Europa Conference League)	0	0 (Note: Appearance in the President of Ireland's Cup)	0	2	0
St Patrick's Athletic	2023	LOI Premier Division	5	0	—		—		—		0 (Note: Appearance(s) in the Leinster Senior Cup)	0	5	0
St Patrick's Athletic	Total		7	0	0	0	—		0	0	0	0	7	0
Cliftonville (loan)	2023–24	NIFL Premiership	20	0	1	0	0	0	—		2 (Note: 1 appearance in the Scottish Challenge Cup and 1 appearance in the County Antrim Shield)	0	23	0
Cliftonville	2023–24	NIFL Premiership	10	0	5	0	—		—		—		15	0
Cliftonville	2024–25	NIFL Premiership	28	0	2	0	1	0	2 (Note: Appearance(s) in the UEFA Conference League)	0	3 (Note: 1 appearance in the NIFL Charity Shield & 2 appearances in the County Antrim Shield)	0	36	0
Cliftonville	Total		38	0	7	0	1	0	2	0	3	0	51	0
Cork City	2025	LOI Premier Division	3	0	0	0	—		—		—		3	0
Cork City	2026	LOI First Division	3	0	0	0	—		—		0 (Note: Appearance(s) in the Munster Senior Cup)	0	3	0
Cork City	Total		6	0	0	0	—		—		0	0	6	0
Vestri	2027	1. deild karla	0	0	0	0	–		–		–		0	0
Career total			120	0	8	0	1	0	2	0	5	0	136	0

== Honours ==
Cliftonville

- Irish Cup: 2023–24

Cork City

- League of Ireland First Division: 2026
