= Adam Murphy =

Irish footballer (born 2005)

Personal information
- Full name: Adam Murphy
- Date of birth: 8 April 2005 (age 21)
- Place of birth: Dublin, Ireland
- Height: 1.78 m (5 ft 10 in)
- Position: Central midfielder

Team information
- Current team: Fleetwood Town (on loan from Bristol City)
- Number: 15

Youth career
- 2011–2013: Donnycarney United
- 2013–2019: Belvedere
- 2020–2022: St Patrick's Athletic
- 2024–2025: Bristol City

Senior career*
Years	Team	Apps	(Gls)
2021–2023	St Patrick's Athletic	33	(1)
2024–	Bristol City	0	(0)
2025–2026	→ Swindon Town (loan)	3	(0)
2026–	→ Fleetwood Town (loan)	10	(0)

International career^{‡}
2019–2020	Republic of Ireland U15	10	(2)
2022	Republic of Ireland U17	3	(0)
2023–2025	Republic of Ireland U21	9	(0)
- * Club domestic league appearances and goals as of 23:18, 27 October 2026 (UTC) ‡ National team caps and goals as of 00:24, 18 November 2026 (UTC)

Adam Murphy (born 8 April 2005) is an Irish professional footballer who plays as a central midfielder for EFL League Two club Fleetwood Town, on loan from Championship club Bristol City. He previously played for St Patrick's Athletic, where he started his professional career and Swindon Town.

== Club career ==
=== Youth career ===
Murphy began playing with his local side Donnycarney United before moving to top Dublin academy Belvedere where he played from U8 to U15 level where he impressed League of Ireland club St Patrick's Athletic to sign him in January 2020. He initially captained the club's U15 side before quickly moving up through the U17 and U19 sides. He was called up to train with the first team at aged 15 during 2021 after the club had opted to pay for private schooling for him at The Institute of Education in order to allow him also train during the mornings. On 20 October 2021, Murphy captained the club's U19 side away to Crvena Zvezda in the UEFA Youth League. He was part of the side that won the League of Ireland U19 Division in 2022. In February 2023, Murphy featured in a Sky News report on how young Irish footballers career paths have been impacted by Brexit.

=== St Patrick's Athletic ===
==== 2021 season ====
Murphy signed his first professional contract with St Patrick's Athletic on 7 July 2021, alongside James Abankwah. He was named on the substitutes bench for first team games away to Bohemians in July 2021 and at home to Dundalk in October 2021.

==== 2022 season ====
Murphy's senior debut came on 25 February 2022 when he replaced Billy King in the 85th minute of a 2–1 loss at home to Sligo Rovers. His first start at senior level came on 8 April 2022, his 17th birthday, in a 0–0 draw at home to Dundalk in which Murphy impressed in the opening 21 minutes before being forced off with a hamstring injury that would require surgery and keep him out of action for almost the entirety of the rest of the season. That start made him the youngest player to start a game for the club in the modern era at the time (the feat has since been taken by Sam Curtis). His return from injury came on 6 November 2023 in the final game of the season, a 4–0 win over Shelbourne.

==== 2023 season ====
Murphy picked up an injury during pre-season for the 2023 season which delayed his progress at the start of the season, having to wait until 17 March 2023 for his first league appearance of the season when he came off the bench against Shamrock Rovers to provide an assist for Jake Mulraney's 89th-minute equaliser in a 2–2 draw at Tallaght Stadium. His first start of the season came on 14 April 2023, in a 3–2 win away to Bohemians, with manager Tim Clancy stating after the game that "From anywhere I've played or managed, he's the best young kid I've ever seen. I rate him that highly, he's exceptional, a really good player." On 5 May 2023, Murphy scored the first goal of his senior career, coming off the bench at half time to score the winning goal in a 3–2 win away to Cork City at Turners Cross. On 12 July 2023, Murphy made his first appearance in European competition in a 2–1 loss against F91 Dudelange in the first qualifying round of the UEFA Europa Conference League at the Stade Jos Nosbaum. On 20 July 2023, Murphy gave his side a 2–1 lead on the night in the return leg against F91 Dudelange, before his side eventually lost out 3–2 at Richmond Park. On 23 July 2023, Murphy scored his second goal in 4 days when he opened the scoring in a 2–1 win away to Longford Town in the first round of the 2023 FAI Cup. His form in July saw him voted as the club's Player of the Month and in August 2023, he was subject to a bid from EFL Championship club Bristol City, which was turned down. On 12 November 2023, Murphy came off the bench in the 2023 FAI Cup Final, in a 3–1 win over Bohemians in front of a record breaking FAI Cup Final crowd of 43,881 at the Aviva Stadium.

=== Bristol City ===
On 3 January 2024, Murphy signed for EFL Championship club Bristol City on a three-and-a-half-year deal with an additional 12-month option. Murphy's first 18 months at the club were severely hampered with injury issues, meaning he had to wait until 9 August 2025 for his first involvement in a matchday squad with the first team, in which he was an unused substitute in a 4–1 win away to Sheffield United.

==== Swindon Town loan ====
On 1 September 2025, Murphy signed for EFL League Two side Swindon Town on a season long loan deal. He made his debut for the club on 13 September 2025, in a 3–1 win at over Harrogate Town at The County Ground. He made 5 appearances for the club before on 9 January 2026, it was announced that his loan spell had been cut short due to an ankle injury suffered in training, with Swindon manager Ian Holloway stating "I feel for him, I really do. I really liked him. I think he's really going to make himself a player. Would I have him back here? All day long, fantastic lad. But unfortunately, injuries happen, so yes, he won't be coming back.", before he returned to his parent club to continue his rehabilitation on the injury.

==== Fleetwood Town loan ====
On 20 August 2026, Murphy joined EFL League Two side Fleetwood Town on a six-month loan.

== International career ==
Murphy has for the Republic of Ireland U15 and U17 sides. In March 2023, he was called up to train with the Republic of Ireland U21 team by manager Jim Crawford, despite being just 17 years old. On 31 August 2023, Murphy received his first full call up to the Republic of Ireland U21 squad for their 2025 UEFA European Under-21 Championship qualification fixtures against Turkey U21 and San Marino U21. On 8 September 2023, he made his Republic of Ireland U21 debut, in a 3–2 win over Turkey U21 at Turners Cross. Murphy received his first call up to the Republic of Ireland U19 squad in October 2023.

== Career statistics ==
As of match played on 27 October 2026

Appearances and goals by club, season and competition
Club	Season	League			National Cup (Note: Includes FAI Cup & FA Cup)		League Cup (Note: Includes EFL Cup)		Europe		Other		Total	
Club	Season	Division	Apps	Goals	Apps	Goals	Apps	Goals	Apps	Goals	Apps	Goals	Apps	Goals
St Patrick's Athletic	2021	LOI Premier Division	0	0	0	0	—		—		—		0	0
St Patrick's Athletic	2022	LOI Premier Division	4	0	0	0	—		0 (Note: Appearances in the UEFA Europa Conference League)	0	0 (Note: Appearance in the President of Ireland's Cup)	0	4	0
St Patrick's Athletic	2023	LOI Premier Division	29	1	4	1	—		2	1	1 (Note: Appearance in the Leinster Senior Cup)	0	36	3
St Patrick's Athletic	Total		33	1	4	1	—		2	1	1	0	40	3
Bristol City	2023–24	EFL Championship	0	0	0	0	—		—		—		0	0
Bristol City	2024–25	EFL Championship	0	0	0	0	0	0	—		0 (Note: Appearances in the 2025 EFL Championship play-offs)	0	0	0
Bristol City	2025–26	EFL Championship	0	0	—		0	0	—		—		0	0
Bristol City	2026–27	EFL Championship	0	0	0	0	0	0	—		—		0	0
Bristol City	Total		0	0	0	0	0	0	—		0	0	0	0
Swindon Town (loan)	2025–26	EFL League Two	3	0	1	0	—		—		1 (Note: Appearances in the EFL Trophy)	0	5	0
Fleetwood Town (loan)	2026–27	EFL League Two	10	0	0	0	3	0	—		1	0	14	0
Career total			46	1	5	1	3	0	2	1	3	0	59	3

== Honours ==
St Patrick's Athletic

- FAI Cup: 2023
