= Thijs Timmermans =

Dutch footballer

Personal information
- Date of birth: 25 July 1998 (age 28)
- Place of birth: Hazerswoude-Dorp, Netherlands
- Height: 1.84 m (6 ft 0 in)
- Position: Midfielder

Team information
- Current team: ARC

Youth career
- 2003–2006: V&AV Hazerswoudse Boys
- 2006–2014: ADO Den Haag
- 2014–2015: Alphense Boys
- 2015–2017: ARC

Senior career*
Years	Team	Apps	(Gls)
2017	ARC		
2017–2018	Jong ADO	11	(0)
2018–2019	Jong Dordrecht	7	(2)
2018–2019	FC Dordrecht	26	(0)
2019–2020	Odra Opole	9	(0)
2020–2022	PAEEK	51	(3)
2022–2023	St Patrick's Athletic	25	(1)
2024	Ter Leede		
2024–	ARC		
- * Club domestic league appearances and goals as of 16:25, 25 July 2024 (UTC)

Thijs Timmermans (born 25 July 1998) is a Dutch footballer who plays for ARC. As well as the Netherlands, he has also played in Poland, Cyprus and Ireland during his professional career.

== Club career ==
He made his Eerste Divisie debut for FC Dordrecht on 7 September 2018 in a game against Telstar, as a starter.

Following a season in Poland with Odra Opole and two seasons in Cyprus with PAEEK, Timmermans signed for League of Ireland Premier Division club St Patrick's Athletic on 1 July 2022. He made his first appearance in European football on 21 July 2022 in a 1–1 draw with Slovenian side NŠ Mura in the UEFA Europa Conference League. He made his league debut for the club on 19 August 2022, scoring the opening goal in a 2–1 win away to UCD. On 12 November 2023, Timmermans was part of the squad for the 2023 FAI Cup Final, as his side produced a 3–1 win over Bohemians in front of a record breaking FAI Cup Final crowd of 43,881 at the Aviva Stadium. It was announced in December 2023, that he had departed the club following the end of his contract. On 20 December 2023, it was announced that following ending his professional career, Timmermans would be returning to his local side ARC where he began his senior career for the 2024–25 season. Before re-joining ARC, he spent the first half of 2024 playing for Ter Leede.

== Career statistics ==
As of match played 3 November 2023

Appearances and goals by club, season and competition
Club	Season	League			National cup (Note: Includes KNVB Cup, Polish Cup, Cypriot Cup & FAI Cup)		Europe		Other		Total	
Club	Season	Division	Apps	Goals	Apps	Goals	Apps	Goals	Apps	Goals	Apps	Goals
Jong ADO	2017–18	Beloften Eredivisie	11	0	—		—		—		11	0
Jong Dordrecht	2018–19	Beloften Eredivisie	6	0	—		—		—		6	0
Jong Dordrecht	2019–20	Beloften Eredivisie	1	2	—		—		—		1	2
Jong Dordrecht	Total		7	2	—		—		—		7	2
FC Dordrecht	2018–19	Eerste Divisie	26	0	1	0	—		—		27	0
Odra Opole	2019–20	I liga	9	0	1	0	—		—		10	0
PAEEK	2020–21	Cypriot Second Division	33	3	1	0	—		—		34	3
PAEEK	2021–22	Cypriot First Division	18	0	1	0	—		—		19	0
PAEEK	Total		51	3	2	0	—		—		53	3
St Patrick's Athletic	2022	LOI Premier Division	7	1	1	0	2 (Note: Appearance(s) in UEFA Europa Conference League)	0	—		10	1
St Patrick's Athletic	2023	LOI Premier Division	18	0	1	0	1	0	1 (Note: Appearance in Leinster Senior Cup)	0	21	0
St Patrick's Athletic	Total		25	1	2	0	3	0	1	0	31	1
Career total			129	6	6	0	3	0	1	0	139	6

== Honours ==
PAEEK

- Cypriot Second Division: 2020–21

St Patrick's Athletic

- FAI Cup: 2023
