= Conor Carty =

Irish footballer

Personal information
- Full name: Conor Thomas Carty
- Date of birth: 25 May 2002 (age 24)
- Place of birth: Dunlavin, Ireland
- Height: 1.84 m (6 ft 0 in)
- Position: Striker

Team information
- Current team: FC Halifax Town
- Number: 9

Youth career
- –2014: Kilcullen AFC
- 2014–2015: Newbridge Town
- 2015–2017: St Francis
- 2017–2022: Wolverhampton Wanderers

Senior career*
Years	Team	Apps	(Gls)
2022–2025	Bolton Wanderers	0	(0)
2022	→ Oldham Athletic (loan)	4	(0)
2022–2023	→ Gateshead (loan)	4	(1)
2023	→ St Patrick's Athletic (loan)	34	(5)
2024	→ Doncaster Rovers (loan)	3	(0)
2025	St Patrick's Athletic	24	(1)
2026	Waterford	14	(0)
2026–	FC Halifax Town	16	(3)

International career^{‡}
- Republic of Ireland U15
2018	Republic of Ireland U16	2	(0)
2018–2019	Republic of Ireland U17	10	(1)
2019	Republic of Ireland U18	2	(0)
2023	Republic of Ireland U21	4	(1)
- * Club domestic league appearances and goals as of 19:40, 16 November 2026 (UTC) ‡ National team caps and goals as of 01:22, 16 October 2024 (UTC)

Conor Thomas Carty (born 25 May 2002) is an Irish footballer who plays as a forward for National League club FC Halifax Town.

== Club career ==
=== Youth career ===
Carty initially played Gaelic football, playing for Wicklow GAA at county level. He briefly played with Kilcullen AFC and also played schoolboy football for Newbridge Town. At U15 level, he signed for Dublin club St Francis. He came through the Wolverhampton Wanderers Academy, after joining in 2017. He signed his first professional contract with Wolverhampton Wanderers on 17 April 2020, penning a one-year deal. On 23 April 2021, Carty renewed his contract at Molineux for a further year.

=== Bolton Wanderers ===
Upon the expiration of his contract at Wolves, he joined Bolton Wanderers on 17 June 2022, linking up with the newly formed 'B' team. Carty made his Bolton debut on 20 September 2022 in a 2–2 draw against Tranmere Rovers in the EFL Trophy, coming on in the 84th minute as a substitute for Eoin Toal, and went onto score the equalising goal seven minutes later. Tranmere went on to win the Penalty shoot-out, however. On 19 December 2023, he and fellow B-Team prospect Luke Matheson signed new deals up to 2025 that would also promote them to the first-team squad.

==== Oldham Athletic loan ====
On 21 October 2022, Carty was loaned out to National League side Oldham Athletic on loan for a month. He made five appearances for Latics before returning to Bolton Wanderers.

==== Gateshead loan ====
On 18 November, he was sent out on loan to fellow National League side Gateshead until January 2023. On 9 January 2023, after he made four league appearances, scoring once; Carty's loan with The Heed came to an end and he once again returned to the University of Bolton Stadium.

==== St Patrick's Athletic loan ====
On 4 February 2023, Carty returned to the Republic of Ireland as he joined League of Ireland Premier Division side, St Patrick's Athletic on loan until 30 November; upon his arrival he was given the number 15 shirt for the upcoming campaign. His first goal for the club came on 5 May 2023, when he opened the scoring in a 3–2 win away to Cork City at Turners Cross. On 26 May 2023, he came off the bench in the 61st minute to score the winning goal in the 81st minute of a 2–1 victory over Dundalk at Richmond Park, with his side down to 10 men for the majority of the second half. He followed that up by scoring in his next game, opening the scoring in a 3–1 win away to UCD at the UCD Bowl. On 26 June 2023, he scored the opening goal of a 1–1 draw away to Dundalk at Oriel Park. On 12 July 2023, Carty made his first appearance in European competition in a 2–1 loss against F91 Dudelange in the first qualifying round of the UEFA Europa Conference League at the Stade Jos Nosbaum. On 8 October 2023, he scored the second goal in a 2–0 win away to Cork City in the semi-final of the FAI Cup. On 20 October 2023, he scored for the second game running, scoring the second goal in a 2–0 win away to Bohemians at Dalymount Park. On 12 November 2023, Carty was part of the starting XI in the 2023 FAI Cup final, in a 3–1 win over Bohemians in front of a record breaking FAI Cup final crowd of 43,881 at the Aviva Stadium.

==== Doncaster Rovers loan ====
On 3 January 2024, Carty signed for League Two club Doncaster Rovers on loan until the end of the season. The loan was cut short on 2 February after Carty suffered an Anterior cruciate ligament injury.

=== St Patrick's Athletic ===
On 15 January 2025, Carty returned to League of Ireland Premier Division club St Patrick's Athletic, where he had a loan spell in 2023, on a permanent basis, signing a two-year contract. On 20 July 2025, Carty scored his first goal since returning to the club, with a looping header into the top corner in an 8–0 win over UCC in the FAI Cup. On 3 August 2025, Carty came off the bench in the 75th minute away to Waterford at the RSC, then 9 minutes later scored his first league goal of the season by meeting Brandon Kavanagh's corner kick first time on the volley to secure a 2–0 win for his side. On 14 August 2025, he scored the European goal of his career, scoring the first goal of the game from the penalty spot away to Turkish giants Beşiktaş in the UEFA Conference League. On 10 October 2025, he scored the final goal of the game in a 4–0 win over St Mochta's in the Leinster Senior Cup to help earn his side a place in the final.

=== Waterford ===
On 12 December 2025, it was announced that Carty had been sold to League of Ireland Premier Division club Waterford on a long-term-contract for an undisclosed fee. He departed the club on 8 July 2026, having failed to score a goal in 14 appearances for them.

=== FC Halifax Town ===
On 8 July 2026, Carty signed for National League club FC Halifax Town on a one-year contract.

== International career ==
Having represented the Republic of Ireland at Under 15, Under 16, Under 17 and Under 18 level, Carty was called up to the Republic of Ireland U21 side for the first time on 6 June 2023 for the team's friendly fixtures against Gabon U23, Ukraine U21 & Kuwait U22 in Austria on 13, 16 & 19 June 2023. Carty made his Republic of Ireland U21 debut on 16 June 2023, in a 2–2 draw with Ukraine U21. Carty scored his first goal for the 21s in a 3–0 win over Kuwait U22.

== Career statistics ==
As of match played 14 November 2026

Appearances and goals by club, season and competition
Club	Season	League			National Cup (Note: Includes FA Cup & FAI Cup)		League Cup (Note: Includes EFL Cup & National League Cup)		Europe		Other		Total	
Club	Season	Division	Apps	Goals	Apps	Goals	Apps	Goals	Apps	Goals	Apps	Goals	Apps	Goals
Wolverhampton Wanderers U-23s	2020–21	—	—		—		—		—		2 (Note: Appearance(s) in the EFL Trophy)	0	2	0
Wolverhampton Wanderers U-23s	2021–22	—	—		—		—		—		3	0	3	0
Wolverhampton Wanderers U-23s	Total		—		—		—		—		5	0	5	0
Bolton Wanderers	2022–23	League One	0	0	0	0	0	0	—		1	1	1	1
Bolton Wanderers	2023–24	League One	0	0	0	0	—		—		0	0	0	0
Bolton Wanderers	2024–25	League One	0	0	0	0	0	0	—		0	0	0	0
Bolton Wanderers	Total		0	0	0	0	0	0	—		1	1	1	1
Oldham Athletic (loan)	2022–23	National League	4	0	1	0	—		—		0	0	5	0
Gateshead (loan)	2022–23	National League	4	1	—		—		—		0	0	4	1
St Patrick's Athletic (loan)	2023	LOI Premier Division	34	5	5	1	—		2 (Note: Appearance(s) in the UEFA Europa Conference League)	0	—		41	6
Doncaster Rovers (loan)	2023–24	League Two	3	0	—		—		—		2	0	5	0
St Patrick's Athletic	2025	LOI Premier Division	24	1	3	1	—		4 (Note: Appearance(s) in the UEFA Conference League)	1	6 (Note: Appearance(s) in the Leinster Senior Cup)	3	37	6
Waterford	2026	LOI Premier Division	14	0	—		—		—		0 (Note: Appearance(s) in the Munster Senior Cup)	0	14	0
Halifax Town	2026–27	National League	16	3	1	0	2	1	—		0	0	19	4
Career total			99	10	10	2	2	1	6	1	14	4	131	18

== Honours ==
St Patrick's Athletic

- FAI Cup: 2023
- Leinster Senior Cup runner up: 2024–25
