= Tommy Lonergan =

Irish footballer

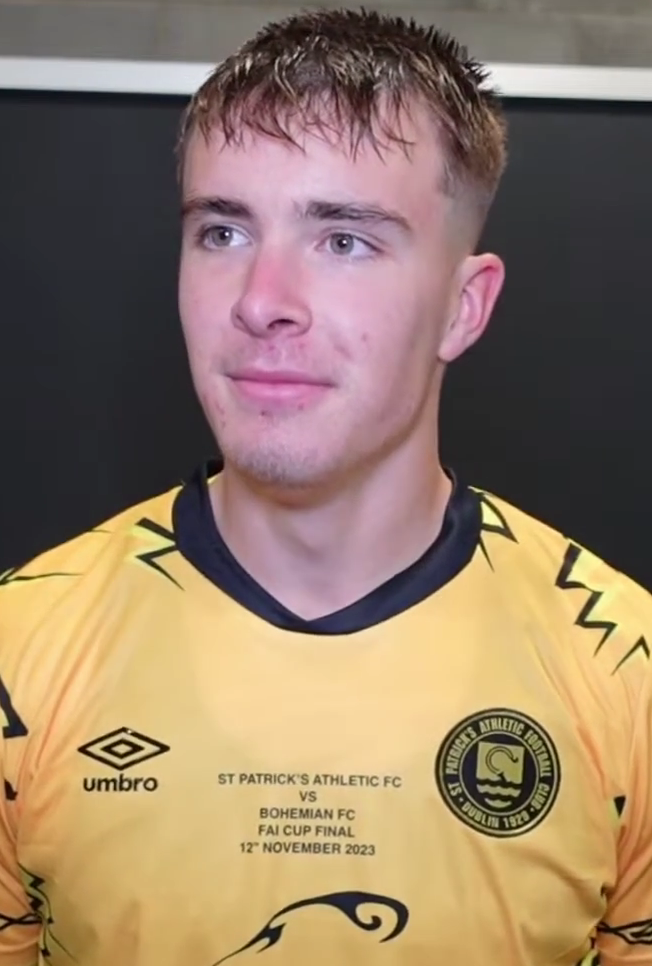
- Lonergan with St Patrick's Athletic in 2023

Personal information
- Full name: Thomas Lonergan
- Date of birth: 2 January 2004 (age 22)
- Place of birth: Dunboyne, Ireland
- Position: Forward

Team information
- Current team: Waterford
- Number: 18

Youth career
- 2012–2019: Cherry Orchard
- 2019–2021: St Patrick's Athletic

Senior career*
Years	Team	Apps	(Gls)
2021	St Patrick's Athletic	0	(0)
2022	UCD	19	(6)
2023–2024	St Patrick's Athletic	31	(4)
2024–2025	Fleetwood Town	15	(1)
2025	→ Waterford (loan)	22	(6)
2025–	Waterford	45	(19)

International career^{‡}
2019–2020	Republic of Ireland U16	6	(4)
2021	Republic of Ireland U18	3	(1)
2022–2023	Republic of Ireland U19	5	(3)
2024–2026	Republic of Ireland U21	11	(4)
- * Club domestic league appearances and goals as of 21:43, 30 October 2026 (UTC) ‡ National team caps and goals as of 23:59, 17 November 2026 (UTC)

Thomas Lonergan (born 2 January 2004) is an Irish professional footballer who plays as a forward for League of Ireland Premier Division club Waterford.

== Club career ==
=== Youth career ===
A native of Dunboyne, County Meath, Lonergan left his schoolboy club Cherry Orchard to join the academy of St Patrick's Athletic in March 2019, where he initially played with the U15 side, before progressing to the U17 and U19 teams over the following three seasons. His debut season with the club was a success, as he won a league and cup double with the U15s. In September/October 2021, he started both legs of the U19s side's UEFA Youth League tie against Crvena Zvezda as his side lost 2–1 at home and 2–0 away to exit the competition.

=== St Patrick's Athletic ===
Lonergan's senior debut for the club came on 23 July 2021, when he replaced Billy King from the bench for the final 10 minutes of a 6–0 win over Bray Wanderers in the FAI Cup. This proved to be his only first team playing time of the season as he remained an unused substitute on 10 occasions in the league and cup.

=== UCD ===
In search of regular first team football, Lonergan signed for UCD on 21 January 2022. Following an ankle fracture in pre-season, he had to wait until 19 May 2022 to make his debut, when he came off the bench in a 3–0 defeat against Shamrock Rovers at the UCD Bowl. The first senior goal of his career came on 7 July 2022 in a 3–1 defeat at home to Bohemians. On 29 July 2022, Lonergan scored twice in a 3–0 win at home to Cockhill Celtic in the First Round of the FAI Cup. On 1 August 2022, he scored his 4th goal in five games in a 1–1 draw away to Drogheda United to lift his side off the bottom of the table. On 26 August 2022, he scored another two FAI Cup goals, as his side defeated Galway United at Eamonn Deacy Park. On 9 September 2022, Lonergan scored 2 goals in a vital 3–2 win at home to Dundalk, to again lift his side off the bottom of the table. A week later he scored a consolation goal in a 4–1 loss away to Treaty United in the Quarter Final of the FAI Cup. Lonergan condemned relegation rivals Finn Harps to the League of Ireland First Division on 28 October 2022, when he scored 2 second half goals in a 3–1 win at Finn Park to avoid automatic relegation for his side. He scored the winning goal of the game in the 2022 Promotion/Relegation Playoff Final on 11 November 2022 as his side defeated Waterford 1–0 at Richmond Park to confirm their League of Ireland Premier Division status for 2023. His form for UCD drew interest from all of the top 4 clubs, with Dundalk and St Patrick's Athletic offering him contracts, while Derry City and Shamrock Rovers were reportedly monitoring his situation.

=== Return to St Patrick's Athletic ===
On 25 November 2022, it was announced that Lonergan would be returning to St Patrick's Athletic, signing a multi-year contract ahead of the 2023 season and becoming manager Tim Clancy's first signing of the off season. On 30 June 2023, he scored his first goals for three club, coming off the bench in the 60th minute to score two goals in a 7–0 win against his old club UCD at Richmond Park. On 12 July 2023, Lonergan made his first appearance in European competition when he came off the bench for the final 9 minutes of a 2–1 loss against F91 Dudelange in the first qualifying round of the UEFA Europa Conference League at the Stade Jos Nosbaum, in which his cross was unsuccessfully cleared by a defender, allowing Mark Doyle to pull a goal back for his side. On 15 September 2023, Lonergan scored an 85th-minute winner in a 2–1 win away to Finn Harps in the FAI Cup, to earn his side a place in the Semi Final. The following week Lonergan returned to the starting XI and scored twice in a 3–1 win over Dundalk at Richmond Park. On 12 November 2023, Lonergan came off the bench to score his side's third goal of the game in the 87th minute of the 2023 FAI Cup Final, in a 3–1 win over Bohemians in front of a record breaking FAI Cup Final crowd of 43,881 at the Aviva Stadium.

=== Fleetwood Town ===
On 1 February 2024, it was announced that Lonergan had signed for EFL League One club Fleetwood Town on a two-and-a-half-year contract for an undisclosed fee. He made his debut for the club on 12 March 2024, coming off the bench as a late substitute in a 0–0 draw at home to Bristol Rovers. He scored his first goal for the club on 27 April 2024, in a 3–0 win over Burton Albion on the last day of the season in what proved to be his only goal of the season in his nine appearances as his side were relegated to EFL League Two.

=== Waterford ===
On 6 January 2025, Lonergan returned to Ireland, signing for Waterford on a season long loan deal from sister club Fleetwood Town. He opened his account for the club in a 3–2 win away to Sligo Rovers at The Showgrounds in the opening league game of the season. After impressing the club scoring six goals in 22 games Lonergan joined Waterford on a permanent basis on 18 July 2025 on a multi-year contract. The same day after singing permanently he scored twice in a 5–1 win over St Mochta's in the FAI Cup. Lonergan's impressive form in 2026 saw him leading the league's goalscoring charts with 10 goals in 20 games, form which on 1 July 2026 saw Derry City make a bid of €180,000 for him (a record bid between two League of Ireland clubs) which was turned down by Waterford. Two days later, he scored twice in a 4–2 win away to Derry City to help his side off the bottom of the table for the first time since the opening month of the season. For the first time in his career he was named League of Ireland Player of the Month, for July 2026. His form over the season saw him named in the 2026 PFAI Team of the Year by his fellow players in the league. On 30 October 2026, Lonergan scored his 16th league goal of the season with an 88th-minute winner in a 3–2 victory away to Shelbourne in the final game of the season to beat strike partner Pádraig Amond to the league's top goalscorer award by one goal. On 8 November 2026, he started in the 2026 FAI Cup final as his side were defeated 1–0 by Derry City at the Aviva Stadium. At the end of the season he was voted PFAI Young Player of the Year by his fellow players in the league.

== International career ==
Lonergan has represented the Republic of Ireland at youth level, playing for both the under 16, under 18 and under 19 sides. On 20 August 2019, he made his debut for the Republic of Ireland U16 team in a 4–2 loss to Denmark U19. He scored his first goal for the side 2 days later in a 3–3 draw with England U16 at St George's Park. His Republic of Ireland U18 debut came on 14 November 2021 in a 1–0 defeat to Sweden U18 in Marbella, Spain. On 9 December 2021, he scored his first goal for the U18 side, in a 7–1 win over Malta U18. He scored on his Republic of Ireland U19 debut on 21 September 2022, in a 6–0 win over Gibraltar U19 in Wales. In November 2024, he received his first call up to the Republic of Ireland U21 squad for their two friendlies against Sweden U21 in Marbella, Spain. He made his debut in a 2–0 defeat to Sweden in a friendly on 14 November 2024. On 25 September 2026, Lonergan scored his first goal for the U21s, opening the scoring after 2 minutes in a 2–0 win away to Slovakia U21 in a 2027 UEFA European Under-21 Championship qualifier. 4 days later, he scored an 86th-minute winner from the penalty spot in a 4–3 victory at home to Kazakhstan U21 to keep his side's qualification hopes alive. On 6 October 2026, he scored a brace in 3–1 victory over England U21 in a must-win game that secured a Playoff spot for Ireland, taking Lonergan to 4 goals in his last 3 appearances.

== Career statistics ==
As of match played on 8 November 2026

Appearances and goals by club, season and competition
Club	Season	League			National Cup (Note: Includes FAI Cup & FA Cup)		League Cup (Note: Includes EFL Cup)		Europe		Other		Total	
Club	Season	Division	Apps	Goals	Apps	Goals	Apps	Goals	Apps	Goals	Apps	Goals	Apps	Goals
St Patrick's Athletic	2021	LOI Premier Division	0	0	1	0	—		—		—		1	0
UCD	2022	LOI Premier Division	19	6	3	5	—		—		1 (Note: Appearance in the League of Ireland Promotion/Relegation Playoff)	1	23	12
St Patrick's Athletic	2023	LOI Premier Division	31	4	5	2	—		2 (Note: Appearance(s) in the UEFA Europa Conference League)	0	0 (Note: Appearance(s) in the Leinster Senior Cup)	0	38	6
St Patrick's Athletic	2024	LOI Premier Division	—		—		—		—		1	0	1	0
St Patrick's Athletic	Total		31	4	5	2	—		2	0	1	0	39	6
Fleetwood Town	2023–24	EFL League One	9	1	—		—		—		—		9	1
Fleetwood Town	2024–25	EFL League Two	6	0	1	0	3	0	—		1 (Note: Appearance(s) in the EFL Trophy)	0	11	0
Fleetwood Town	Total		15	1	1	0	3	0	—		1	0	20	1
Waterford (loan)	2025	LOI Premier Division	22	6	—		—		—		1 (Note: Appearance(s) in the Munster Senior Cup)	0	23	6
Waterford	2025	LOI Premier Division	11	3	2	3	—		—		1 (Note: Appearance in the 2025 League of Ireland Promotion/Relegation play-off)	0	14	6
Waterford	2026	LOI Premier Division	34	16	4	2	—		—		0	0	38	18
Waterford	Total		45	19	6	5	—		—		1	0	52	24
Career total			132	36	16	12	3	0	2	0	5	1	158	49

== Honours ==
=== Club ===
St Patrick's Athletic

- FAI Cup (2): 2021, 2023

=== Individual ===
- PFAI Young Player of the Year: 2026
- League of Ireland Player of the Month: July 2026
- PFAI Team of the Year: 2026
