= Noah Lewis (footballer) =

Dutch footballer (born 2000)

Personal information
- Date of birth: 23 August 2000 (age 26)
- Place of birth: Almere, Netherlands
- Height: 1.94 m (6 ft 4 in)
- Position: Centre-back

Team information
- Current team: Dolomiti Bellunesi
- Number: 4

Youth career
- 2005–2011: Waterwijk
- 2011–2012: Almere City
- 2012–2019: Feyenoord

Senior career*
Years	Team	Apps	(Gls)
2019–2021	Feyenoord	0	(0)
2019–2020	→ FC Dordrecht (loan)	10	(0)
2021–2022	Willem II	0	(0)
2023	St Patrick's Athletic	17	(2)
2024–2026	Perugia	17	(1)
2026–	Dolomiti Bellunesi	0	(0)

International career
2017	Netherlands U17	1	(0)
- * Club domestic league appearances and goals as of 24 August 2026

Noah Lewis (born 23 August 2000) is a Dutch professional footballer who plays as a centre-back for Serie C Group A club Dolomiti Bellunesi.

== Club career ==
=== Youth career ===
Born in Almere, Lewis started out playing with Waterwijk, before joining Almere City at the age of 11, where he spent 1 year before joining Feyenoord Academy in 2012. He spent 7 years playing at Youth level for Feyenoord, featuring in the Beloften Eredivisie, KNVB Reserve Cup, Premier League International Cup and UEFA Youth League.

=== Feyenoord ===
Lewis made his first team debut for Feyenoord on 21 March 2018, replacing Sven van Beek from the bench in a 4–0 win over ADO Den Haag in a friendly.

==== FC Dordrecht loan ====
In July 2019, he was loaned out to Eerste Divisie side FC Dordrecht until 2 January 2020. He made a total of 10 appearances in the league and 2 more in the KNVB Cup.

=== Willem II ===
Lewis signed for Eredivisie side Willem II in September 2021. He featured mainly for the club's reserve side but was an unused substitute in 3 of the first team's Eredivisie games during the season as they were relegated to the Eerste Divisie.

=== St Patrick's Athletic ===
On 26 January 2023, Lewis signed for League of Ireland Premier Division club St Patrick's Athletic. Manager Tim Clancy revealed that the opportunity to sign Lewis came about after a move to a UK club collapsed after Lewis failed to obtain a work permit for that country as he did not meet the criteria following a rule change due to Brexit. Lewis was voted Player of the Month for February 2023 by the clubs supporters for his performances in his first month with the club. He scored the first goals of his senior career on 2 June 2023, coming off the bench away to UCD and scoring a header from a corner with his first touch in the 42nd minute, before scoring another header from a corner in the 63rd minute of a 3–1 win. On 12 July 2023, Lewis made his first appearance in European competition in a 2–1 loss against F91 Dudelange in the first qualifying round of the UEFA Europa Conference League at the Stade Jos Nosbaum. On 12 August 2023, it was announced that Lewis had left the club by mutual consent.

=== Perugia ===
On 11 January 2024, Lewis signed for Serie C side Perugia on a contract until June 2026, following a successful trial period with the Italian club. In August 2024, Lewis underwent surgery on the Anterior cruciate ligament on his right knee after an injury, with the recovery initially estimated to take a minimum of 6 months.

== International career ==
Lewis made his Netherlands U17 debut on 12 February 2017 in a 2–1 loss to Portugal U17. In October 2018, he was an unused substitute for Netherlands U19 in their 5–0 win over Faroe Islands U19, 6–0 win over Bosnia and Herzegovina U19 and their 2–1 loss to Republic of Ireland U19.

== Career statistics ==
As of match played 23 March 2025

Appearances and goals by club, season and competition
Club	Season	League			National Cup (Note: Includes KNVB Cup, FAI Cup & Coppa Italia)		Europe		Other		Total	
Club	Season	Division	Apps	Goals	Apps	Goals	Apps	Goals	Apps	Goals	Apps	Goals
Feyenoord	2019–20	Eredivisie	0	0	—		0 (Note: Appearances in the UEFA Europa League)	0	—		0	0
Feyenoord	2020–21	Eredivisie	0	0	0	0	0	0	—		0	0
Feyenoord	Total		0	0	0	0	0	0	—		0	0
FC Dordrecht (loan)	2019–20	Eerste Divisie	10	0	2	0	—		—		12	0
Willem II	2021–22	Eredivisie	0	0	0	0	—		—		0	0
St Patrick's Athletic	2023	LOI Premier Division	17	2	0	0	1 (Note: Appearances in the UEFA Europa Conference League)	0	0 (Note: Appearances in the Leinster Senior Cup)	0	18	2
Perugia	2023–24	Serie C	15	1	0	0	—		3 (Note: Appearances in the 2023–24 Serie C Promotion play-offs)	0	18	1
Perugia	2024–25	Serie C	2	0	0	0	—		0	0	2	0
Perugia	2025–26	Serie C	0	0	0	0	—		0	0	0	0
Perugia	Total		17	1	0	0	—		3	1	20	1
Career total			44	3	2	0	1	0	3	0	57	3
