= Kian Leavy =

Irish footballer (born 2002)

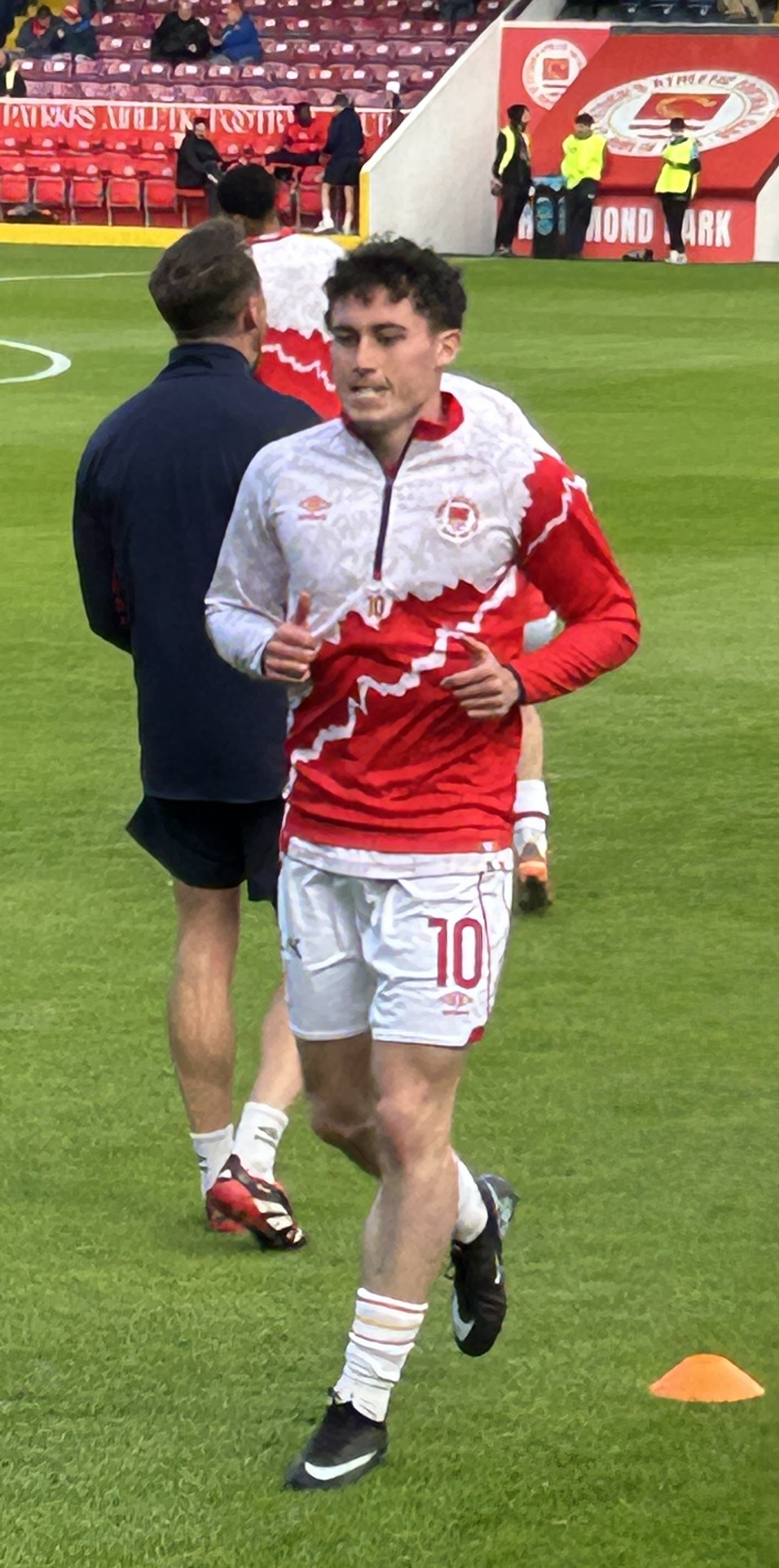
- Leavy during a pre-match warmup with St Patrick's Athletic in 2026.

Personal information
- Full name: Kian Leavy
- Date of birth: 21 March 2002 (age 24)
- Place of birth: Ardee, Ireland
- Position: Midfielder

Team information
- Current team: St Patrick's Athletic
- Number: 10

Youth career
- 2009–: Drogheda Town
- Drogheda Boys
- Shelbourne
- St Francis
- St Kevin's Boys
- –2018: St Patrick's Athletic
- 2018–2021: Reading

Senior career*
Years	Team	Apps	(Gls)
2021–2023	Reading	0	(0)
2023	→ Shelbourne (loan)	11	(1)
2023–	St Patrick's Athletic	98	(10)

International career^{‡}
2017	Republic of Ireland U15	1	(0)
2019	Republic of Ireland U18	1	(0)
2022	Republic of Ireland U20	1	(0)
2023	Republic of Ireland U21	2	(0)
2026–	Republic of Ireland	1	(0)
- * Club domestic league appearances and goals as of 23:38, 30 October 2026 (UTC) ‡ National team caps and goals as of 01:41, 24 October 2026 (UTC)

Kian Leavy (born 21 March 2002) is an Irish professional footballer who plays as a midfielder or winger for League of Ireland Premier Division club St Patrick's Athletic and the Republic of Ireland national team.

== Career ==
=== Early career ===
A native of Ardee, County Louth, Leavy began playing with Drogheda Town at under-8s level, before moving on to Drogheda Boys, Shelbourne, St Francis, St Kevin's Boys and St Patrick's Athletic.

=== Reading ===
In July 2018, he joined the youth academy of EFL Championship side Reading in July 2018 from St Patrick's Athletic's academy after receiving interest from the youth academies of Manchester United and Celtic.

On 2 July 2021, Leavy signed his first professional contract with Reading, until the summer of 2022. On 10 August 2021, Leavy made his debut for Reading in their 3–0 defeat to Swansea City in the EFL Cup. On 9 August 2022, he was in the starting XI in a 2–1 loss to Stevenage in the EFL Cup. On 17 May 2023, it was announced that Leavy would leave Reading in the summer of 2023, upon the expiry of his contract.

==== Shelbourne loan ====
On 8 February 2023, Leavy joined Shelbourne on loan until the summer transfer window. He scored the first senior goal of his career on 3 March 2023, coming off the bench in the 60th minute before scoring the only goal of the game in the 78th minute of a win over Bohemians at Tolka Park. On 6 July 2023, Shelbourne announced that Leavy had left the club at the end of his loan spell after rejecting a contract offer from the club for a permanent move.

=== St Patrick's Athletic ===
==== 2023 season ====
On 6 July 2023, it was announced that Leavy had signed for St Patrick's Athletic, returning to the club where he previously played at youth level. Injured upon signing, he had to wait until 11 August 2023 to make his debut, when he was in the starting XI for a 0–0 draw with Bohemians at Richmond Park. On 23 October 2023, he scored his first senior goal for the club, finding the top left corner from 25 yards in a 1–0 win at home to Sligo Rovers to help his side secure UEFA Conference League football for the following season. On 12 November 2023, Leavy was part of the starting XI in the 2023 FAI Cup Final, in a 3–1 win over Bohemians in front of a record breaking FAI Cup Final crowd of 43,881 at the Aviva Stadium.

==== 2024 season ====
On 8 February 2024, Leavy signed a multi-year contract extension with the club, switching from the squad number 17 squad to number 10 also. On 25 July 2024, he made his first European appearance of his career, replacing Zack Elbouzedi from the bench in a 3–1 win over Vaduz of Liechtenstein in the UEFA Conference League. On 8 October 2024, Leavy scored the winning goal of the game in a 2–1 victory over St Mochta's in the final of the 2023–24 Leinster Senior Cup.

==== 2025 season ====
Leavy scored his first goal of the 2025 season on 21 January 2025 in a 2–1 win over Bray Wanderers at Richmond Park, dribbling past 4 players before finding the bottom right corner. He suffered an ankle ligament injury in pre-season training, undergoing surgery on 12 February 2025, with the recovery period due to keep him out of action for 2 months. On 2 May 2025, he scored his first league goal of the season, opening the scoring in a 2–0 win at home to Galway United that put his side top of the league. On 17 July 2025, Leavy scored the first European goal of his career, scoring his side's second goal of the game in a 2–0 win away to Hegelmann of Lithuania in the UEFA Conference League. On 22 September 2025, he scored the final goal of the game in a 4–0 win at home to Cork City at Richmond Park.

==== 2026 season ====
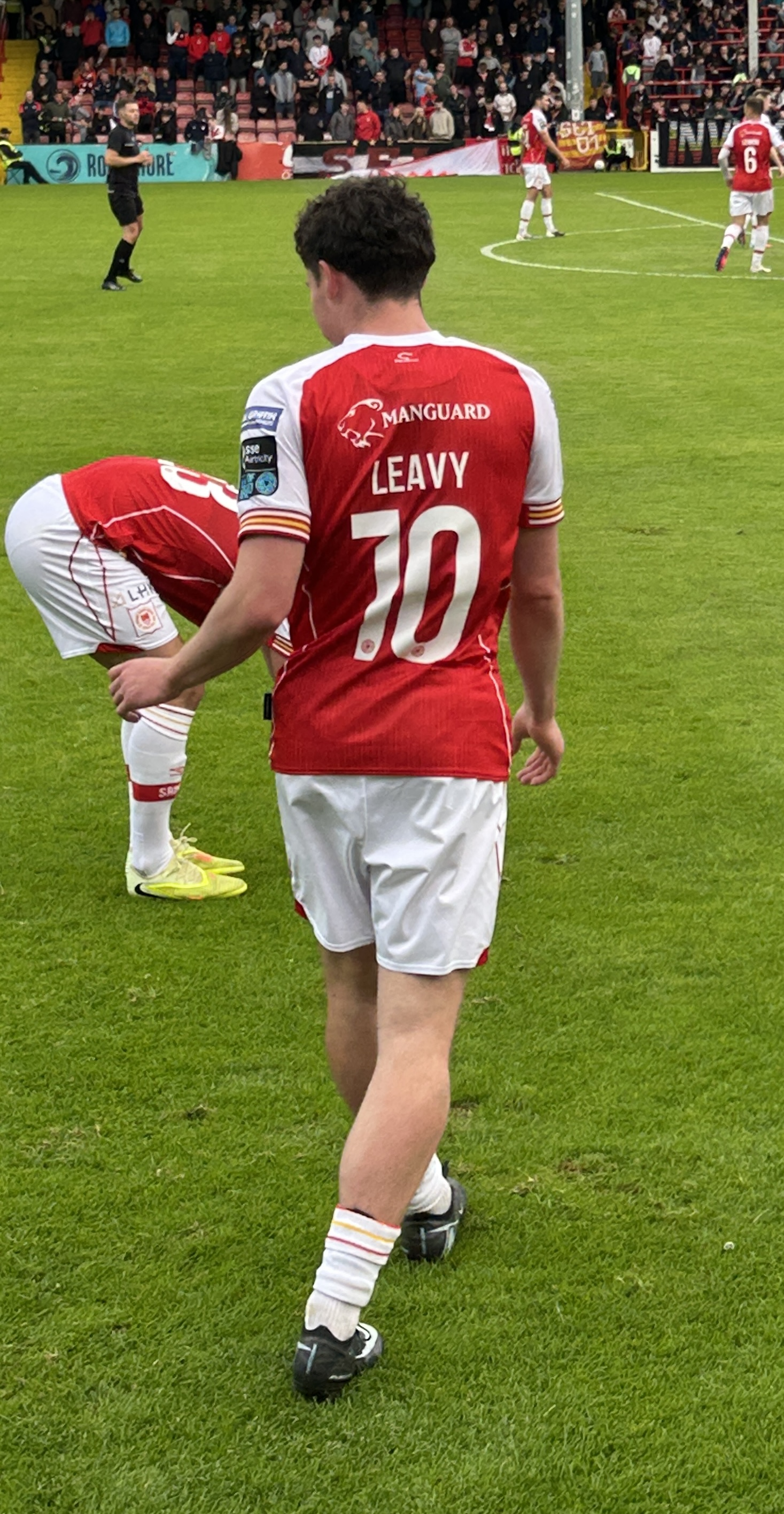
Leavy in action for St Patrick's Athletic in 2026.

On 2 March 2026, Leavy scored his first goal of the season with a 90th-minute winner into the bottom right corner from outside the box in a 1–0 victory over Galway United at Richmond Park. On 13 March 2026, Leavy scored a 68th minute volley to give his side a two-goal lead in an eventual 4–1 win at home to Drogheda United. On 17 April 2026, Leavy's cross forced an own goal from Conor Keeley, then 3 minutes later he found the bottom corner himself to help his side to a 3–1 victory away to Drogheda United. On 4 May 2026, he opened the scoring in a 1–1 draw away to Sligo Rovers by beating two opponents with his first touch, then firing a curled effort into the bottom left corner from 20 yards. On 12 June 2026, he followed up his senior international debut with the opening goal of the game for his club, in a 2–0 win at home to Drogheda United. On 3 July 2026, he scored his side's second goal in a 3–0 win at home to Galway United by finding the top left corner from the edge of the box. Leavy was voted into the 2026 PFAI Team of the Year by his fellow players in the league, alongside 3 of his St Patrick's Athletic teammates. He scored his 7th goal of the season on the final day of the season, finding the top left corner from 25 yards in a 3–2 defeat at home to Bohemians.

== Style of play ==
Leavy can play across the attacking midfield line, centrally, or on the wings and is known for his excellent dribbling ability and fitness levels. In April 2025, Leavy's manager at St Patrick's Athletic and former Republic of Ireland manager Stephen Kenny speaking about Leavy stated "He's remarkable. I said to the players, I learn from him every day. He's a very versatile player, he can play on both wings, in central areas, he's invaluable to us. His work ethic is very high and he's got a high skill level. His levels of professionalism are really up levels, and he's the fittest player we have, he wins all the tests." Kenny drew comparisons in Leavy's dribbling style with Diego Maradona in September 2025, saying "As I said to him in pre-season when he was having a spell like that, dribbling by everyone, it was sort of Maradona-esque, you know? That left footed low centre of gravity, always dribbling on your left foot and going both ways. It's very unusual, you know, and it's very exciting. He's got that trajectory with his dribbling, and then his speed and his unpredictability. He finds a space where it doesn't exist when he's dribbling."

== International career ==
Leavy has featured at youth level for the Republic of Ireland at U15 and U18 level. In March 2022, he featured for the Republic of Ireland U20 side in a 1–0 win against the Republic of Ireland Amateur team in a friendly at Whitehall Stadium. Leavy made his debut for the Republic of Ireland U21 team in a 2–1 friendly win over Iceland U21 at Turners Cross on 26 March 2023.

On 30 May 2026, Leavy was called up to the senior Republic of Ireland squad for the first time, for a friendly away to Canada. On 5 June 2026, Leavy made his senior international debut, coming on as a substitute to replace Troy Parrott in a 1–1 draw with Canada at the Saputo Stadium in Montreal. In doing so, he became the first St Patrick's Athletic player to be capped by the senior international team while playing for the club since Noel Campbell in 1971.

== Career statistics ==
=== Club ===
As of match played 30 October 2026

Appearances and goals by club, season and competition
Club	Season	League			National Cup		League Cup		Europe		Other		Total	
Club	Season	Division	Apps	Goals	Apps	Goals	Apps	Goals	Apps	Goals	Apps	Goals	Apps	Goals
Reading	2021–22	EFL Championship	0	0	0	0	1	0	–		–		1	0
Reading	2022–23	EFL Championship	0	0	0	0	1	0	–		–		1	0
Reading	Total		0	0	0	0	2	0	–		–		2	0
Shelbourne (loan)	2023	LOI Premier Division	11	1	–		–		–		0 (Note: Appearance(s) in Leinster Senior Cup)	0	11	1
St Patrick's Athletic	2023	LOI Premier Division	9	1	3	0	–		0 (Note: Appearances in UEFA Europa Conference League)	0	–		12	1
St Patrick's Athletic	2024	LOI Premier Division	33	0	1	0	—		6 (Note: Appearance(s) in the UEFA Conference League)	0	3 (Note: 1 appearance in the President of Ireland's Cup & 2 appearances, 1 goal in the Leinster Senior Cup)	1	43	1
St Patrick's Athletic	2025	LOI Premier Division	27	2	3	0	—		6	1	2	1	38	4
St Patrick's Athletic	2026	LOI Premier Division	29	7	1	0	—		—		0	0	30	7
St Patrick's Athletic	Total		98	10	8	0	–		12	1	5	2	123	13
Career total			109	11	8	0	2	0	12	1	5	2	136	14

=== International ===
As of match played on 5 June 2026

Appearances and goals by national team and year
National team	Year	Apps	Goals
Republic of Ireland
Republic of Ireland	2026	1	0
Total		1	0

== Honours ==
St Patrick's Athletic

- FAI Cup: 2023
- Leinster Senior Cup: 2023–24

Individual

- PFAI Team of the Year: 2026
