= Sam Curtis =

Irish footballer (born 2005)

- Curtis with Cambridge United in 2026

Personal information
- Full name: Sam Curtis
- Date of birth: 1 December 2005 (age 20)
- Place of birth: Navan, Ireland
- Height: 1.85 m (6 ft 1 in)
- Positions: Right-back; centre-back

Team information
- Current team: Cambridge United (on loan from Sheffield United)
- Number: 29

Youth career
- Parkvilla
- –2019: St Kevin's Boys
- 2019–2021: Shamrock Rovers
- 2021–2022: St Patrick's Athletic

Senior career*
Years	Team	Apps	(Gls)
2020	Shamrock Rovers II	2	(0)
2021–2024	St Patrick's Athletic	53	(3)
2024–	Sheffield United	1	(0)
2024–2025	→ Peterborough United (loan)	17	(0)
2025	→ St Johnstone (loan)	13	(0)
2026	→ Chesterfield (loan)	22	(2)
2026–	→ Cambridge United (loan)	4	(0)

International career^{‡}
2019–2020	Republic of Ireland U15	6	(2)
2021–2022	Republic of Ireland U17	6	(2)
2021–2022	Republic of Ireland U18	5	(0)
2022–2023	Republic of Ireland U19	7	(0)
2023–2026	Republic of Ireland U21	20	(3)
- * Club domestic league appearances and goals as of 08:20, 4 November 2026 (UTC) ‡ National team caps and goals as of 00:13, 18 November 2026 (UTC)

Sam Curtis (born 1 December 2005) is an Irish professional footballer who plays as a right-back or centre-back for EFL League One club Cambridge United, on loan from EFL Championship club Sheffield United. He began his senior career with League of Ireland Premier Division club St Patrick's Athletic. He is the League of Ireland's youngest ever player.

== Club career ==
=== Youth career ===
A native of Navan, County Meath, Curtis began playing with his local side Parkvilla, before moving to the youth section of Dublin team, St Kevin's Boys. He later joined the academy of League of Ireland Premier Division club Shamrock Rovers. In June 2019, he captained the representative team for the Dublin District Schoolboys League that won the Kennedy Cup. While at Rovers, he made his debut in senior football for the club's reserve team Shamrock Rovers II in Ireland's second tier, the League of Ireland First Division. His debut came on 17 October 2020 in a 3–1 win over Athlone Town at age 14, making him the youngest player in League of Ireland history. He spent time on trial at AS Roma and Bayer Leverkusen in the summer of 2021.

=== St Patrick's Athletic ===
==== 2021 season ====
On 25 July 2021, it was announced that Curtis, as well as his brother Ben, had signed for St Patrick's Athletic, where they would initially play with the club's under 19 side. Curtis made his senior debut for the club on 13 August 2021, replacing the injured Lee Desmond in injury time of a 2–1 win over Waterford at Richmond Park, making him the club's youngest ever player at 15 years and 255 days old (until that record was then broken by Mason Melia in 2023). He made his UEFA Youth League debut on 29 September 2021 in a 2–1 loss to Serbian side Crvena Zvezda.

==== 2022 season ====
Both Sam and brother Ben Curtis signed their first professional contracts on 20 January 2022. Curtis' first start for the club came on 6 May 2022 in a 4–0 win away to Drogheda United at United Park. His form in May 2022 saw him voted as the club's Player of the Month by supporters. His first appearances in European competition came in the summer of 2022 when he came off the bench in a 1–1 draw with NŠ Mura of Slovenia and in a 1–0 away win against Bulgarian side CSKA Sofia in the UEFA Europa Conference League. He won the clubs' Player of the Month award for the second time in the season, for September 2022. He made a total of 20 appearances in all competitions during his first full season at the club. His form in his breakthrough season at the club led to reported interest from Manchester City and Chelsea.

==== 2023 season ====
Curtis started the 2023 season off well, making the Right wingback position his own following the departure of Barry Cotter in the offseason. He started the first 6 games of the season in the position, leading up to the March international break which earned him his first callup to the Republic of Ireland U21 side with Pats assistant manager Jon Daly tipping him for a bright future in the game. He earned the club's Player of the Month award for his performances in March 2023. On 19 May 2023, Curtis scored the first goal of his senior career, heading home a Jake Mulraney corner in a 1–0 Dublin derby win away to Shelbourne at Tolka Park. He was voted as the club's Player of the Month for the second time in the season for May 2023. On 30 June 2023, Curtis scored a header from a Jake Mulraney corner to give his side a 3-goal lead in an eventual 7–0 win over UCD at Richmond Park. On 4 August 2023, he scored his 3rd goal of the season, volleying home his sides second goal in a 2–0 win away to Sligo Rovers at The Showgrounds, in what was his 50th appearance for the club in all competitions. On 28 October 2023, he was named as the club's Young Player of the Year for 2023. On 12 November 2023, Curtis was part of the starting XI in the 2023 FAI Cup Final, in a 3–1 win over Bohemians in front of a record breaking FAI Cup Final crowd of 43,881 at the Aviva Stadium. On 15 November 2023, it was announced that Curtis had been included in the PFAI Team of the Year and was one of the 3 nominees for the PFAI Young Player of the Year award, alongside James Clarke and Jack Moylan. On 2 December 2023, he was named PFAI Young Player of the Year for 2023, becoming the youngest ever player to win the award.

=== Sheffield United ===
On 25 January 2024, Curtis signed for Premier League club Sheffield United for an undisclosed international training compensation fee, on a contract until 2027. He was named in the squad for the first time on 25 February 2024, but remained an unused substitute in a 1–0 defeat to Wolverhampton Wanderers at Molineux. On 11 May 2024, he made his debut for the club, coming off the bench in the 63rd minute of a 1–0 loss away to Everton in the Premier League.

==== Peterborough United loan ====
On 2 August 2024, Curtis joined EFL League One side Peterborough United on a season long loan deal. He made his debut for the club on 10 August 2024, in a 2–0 loss at home to Huddersfield Town on the opening day of the season. He was recalled from his loan on 2 January 2025 after making 19 appearances for the club in all competitions.

==== St Johnstone loan ====
On 17 January 2025, Curtis was loaned to St Johnstone until the end of the season, with the side bottom of the Scottish Premiership at the time of joining. He made his debut for the club the following day in a 1–0 win over Motherwell in the Scottish Cup. On 6 April 2025, he helped his side to a clean sheet in a 1–0 victory over Celtic at McDiarmid Park.

==== Chesterfield loan ====
On 4 January 2026, it was announced that Curtis had signed for EFL League Two side Chesterfield on loan until the end of the season. He made his debut the same day, scoring in a 2–2 draw away to Milton Keynes Dons at Stadium MK. On 17 February 2026, he scored the only goal of the game to earn his side three points at home to Gillingham.

==== Cambridge United loan ====
On 1 September 2026, Curtis signed for EFL League One club Cambridge United on a season-long loan deal.

== International career ==
Curtis featured for the Republic of Ireland U15 side in 2019, captaining the side at age 13. He was a prominent player for the Republic of Ireland U17s during their qualification campaign over 2021–2022, scoring 2 goals in 6 appearances. Curtis captained the Republic of Ireland U18 side over 2021–2022. His first call up to the Republic of Ireland U19 team came in September 2022. Curtis received his first call up to the Republic of Ireland U21 side came in March 2023, for a friendly against Iceland U21, despite still being just 17 years old. He played the full 90 minutes in the game as his side came from behind to win 2–1 after playing an hour with 10 men. On 20 June 2023, he was named as Republic of Ireland U18 Player of the Year for 2022 at the FAI International Football Awards. On 6 September 2024, he scored his first goal for the U21s, scoring an 84th-minute winner in his sides 1–0 victory away to Turkey.

== Career statistics ==
As of match played on 3 November 2026

Appearances and goals by club, season and competition
Club	Season	League			National Cup (Note: Includes FAI Cup, FA Cup & Scottish Cup)		League Cup (Note: Includes EFL Cup)		Europe		Other		Total	
Club	Season	Division	Apps	Goals	Apps	Goals	Apps	Goals	Apps	Goals	Apps	Goals	Apps	Goals
Shamrock Rovers II	2020	LOI First Division	2	0	—		—		—		—		2	0
St Patrick's Athletic	2021	LOI Premier Division	1	0	0	0	—		—		—		1	0
St Patrick's Athletic	2022	LOI Premier Division	18	0	0	0	—		2 (Note: Appearances in the UEFA Europa Conference League)	0	0 (Note: Appearance in the President of Ireland's Cup)	0	20	0
St Patrick's Athletic	2023	LOI Premier Division	34	3	3	0	—		2	0	0 (Note: Appearances in the Leinster Senior Cup)	0	39	3
St Patrick's Athletic	Total		53	3	3	0	—		4	0	0	0	60	3
Sheffield United	2023–24	Premier League	1	0	0	0	—		—		—		1	0
Sheffield United	2024–25	EFL Championship	0	0	—		—		—		—		0	0
Sheffield United	2025–26	EFL Championship	0	0	0	0	1	0	—		—		1	0
Sheffield United	2026–27	EFL Championship	0	0	—		0	0	—		—		0	0
Sheffield United	Total		1	0	0	0	1	0	–		—		2	0
Peterborough United (loan)	2024–25	EFL League One	17	0	1	0	1	0	—		0 (Note: Appearances in the EFL Trophy)	0	19	0
St Johnstone (loan)	2024–25	Scottish Premiership	13	0	4	0	—		—		—		17	0
Chesterfield (loan)	2025–26	EFL League Two	22	2	—		—		—		2 (Note: Appearances in the 2026 EFL League Two Playoffs)	0	24	2
Cambridge United (loan)	2026–27	EFL League One	4	0	0	0	—		—		1	0	5	0
Career total			112	5	8	0	2	0	4	0	3	0	129	5

== Honours ==
St Patrick's Athletic

- FAI Cup (2): 2021, 2023

Individual

- PFAI Young Player of the Year (1): 2023
- PFAI Premier Division Team of the Year (1): 2023
- St Patrick's Athletic Young Player of the Year (1): 2023
- FAI Under-18 International Player of the Year (1): 2022
