= Danny Rogers =

Irish footballer (born 1994)

Personal information
- Full name: Daniel Rogers
- Date of birth: 23 March 1994 (age 32)
- Place of birth: New York City, United States
- Position: Goalkeeper

Youth career
- Belvedere
- Cherry Orchard
- Aberdeen

Senior career*
Years	Team	Apps	(Gls)
2011–2020	Aberdeen	3	(0)
2013–2014	→ Airdrieonians (loan)	6	(0)
2014–2015	→ Dumbarton (loan)	34	(0)
2015–2017	→ Falkirk (loan)	64	(0)
2018–2019	→ St Mirren (loan)	4	(0)
2019–2020	→ Greenock Morton (loan)	20	(0)
2020–2021	Kilmarnock	37	(0)
2021–2022	Oldham Athletic	22	(0)
2022–2026	St Patrick's Athletic	34	(0)

International career^{‡}
2014–2016	Republic of Ireland U21	10	(0)
- * Club domestic league appearances and goals as of 12:01, 13 November 2026 (UTC) ‡ National team caps and goals as of 02:15, 4 November 2018 (UTC)

Daniel "Danny" Rogers (born 23 March 1994) is an Irish-American footballer who plays as a goalkeeper. Born in the United States, he has represented the Republic of Ireland at youth level.

== Personal life ==
Rogers was born in New York and has an Irish mother and an American father. He holds an American passport. The family, including Rogers and his two brothers, moved back to Ireland when he was five years old and was raised in Artane, County Dublin. Before signing with Aberdeen, he was close to going on a scholarship to the United States.

== Club career ==
=== Aberdeen ===
Rogers signed his first professional contract with Aberdeen in July 2011 and played regularly for the club's youth sides. In December 2013, he joined Airdrieonians on loan for a month but returned to the Dons at the end of this short spell.

On 1 August 2014, he signed for Dumbarton on a six-month loan deal after impressing in friendly matches as a trialist. He made his debut in a 1–0 victory over Brechin City and was named the club's Player of the Month for September 2014. His loan deal was extended on 2 January 2015, until the end of the 2014–15 season. At the end of the season, he scooped the 'Dumbarton Terrace' and Baxter Ramsay (club sponsor) Player of the Year awards as well as the prestigious Sonstrust Young Player of the Season accolade. He returned to parent club Aberdeen having made 36 appearances in total for Ian Murray's side, keeping nine clean sheets.

On 26 June 2015, Rogers moved to Falkirk on a loan deal for the whole of the 2015–16 season. During his loan spell, he was announced as part of the PFA Scotland Championship Team of the Season. In July 2016, Rogers returned to the Falkirk Stadium for a second season-long loan spell.

Rogers made his debut for Aberdeen on 24 January 2018, coming on as a substitute for the injured Joe Lewis in a 2–0 defeat away to Rangers. At the end of the 2017–18 season, Rogers signed a two-year contract with Aberdeen.

In July 2018, Rogers moved to St Mirren on a season-long loan deal.

In August 2019, Rogers moved to Greenock Morton on a season-long loan deal.

On 10 June 2020, Rogers announced his departure from Aberdeen via his Twitter account.

=== Kilmarnock ===
On 28 July 2020, Rogers signed a one-year deal with Kilmarnock. He made his debut on 1 August 2020, against Hibernian, as a half-time substitute for the injured Jake Eastwood. He left Kilmarnock at the end of the 2020–21 season.

=== Oldham Athletic ===
In August 2021, Rogers signed to Oldham Athletic. His debut was the first game of the season in EFL League Two at home against Newport County. Rogers failed to stop the only goal of the game allowing Newport to win 1–0. Rogers was released at the end of the 2021–22 season following relegation.

=== St Patrick's Athletic ===
Rogers returned home to Dublin to sign for League of Ireland Premier Division club St Patrick's Athletic on 14 August 2022, replacing the outbound Joseph Anang. He made his debut for the club on the same day, keeping a clean sheet in a 1–0 win over Sligo Rovers. Rogers made 10 appearances by the end of the season as his side came 4th and qualified for the UEFA Europa Conference League for the following season. On 13 December 2022, Rogers signed a new contract with the club for the 2023 season. On 24 February 2023, in the pre-match warmup ahead of a home fixture against Shelbourne, Rogers suffered a dislocated, compound fracture, which saw the bone came out of the skin also, an injury that would keep him out of action for a minimum of 3 months. On 12 November 2023, Rogers was part of the squad for the 2023 FAI Cup Final, as his side produced a 3–1 win over Bohemians in front of a record breaking FAI Cup Final crowd of 43,881 at the Aviva Stadium. On 24 November 2023, Rogers signed a new contract with the club. On 8 March 2024, Rogers made his first league appearance since October 2022, keeping a clean sheet in a 1–0 win at home to Dundalk as he replaced the club's Liverpool loanee goalkeeper Marcelo Pitaluga after his struggle for form in the early season fixtures. He lost his place as first choice goalkeeper in July 2024, when Joseph Anang returned to the club from West Ham United. On 8 October 2024, Rogers was part of the Pats side that defeated St Mochta's 2–1 in the final of the 2023–24 Leinster Senior Cup. On 24 October 2024, it was announced that Rogers had signed a contract extension to keep him at the club for a further 2 years, until the end of the 2026 season. In March 2026, Rogers underwent surgery on his knee to repair a cartilage issue, with the recovery period keeping him out of action until May. He made his return to action on 28 May 2026, keeping a clean sheet in a 1–0 win away to Dundalk in the Leinster Senior Cup Semi-final. On 12 June 2026, he made his first league appearance in 2 years, keeping a clean sheet in a 2–0 win at home to Drogheda United, with Rogers filling in for Joseph Anang due to his involvement in the Ghana squad at the 2026 FIFA World Cup. He kept 3 clean sheets in 4 appearances and was voted the club's Player of the Month for June 2026, before returning to the bench upon Anang's return from the World Cup. In November 2026, the club confirmed that Rogers would depart following the end of his contract, having made 46 appearances during his 4 and a half years with the club.

== International career ==
Rogers' performances on loan at Dumbarton earned him a call-up to the Republic of Ireland U21 squad for the game against Norway U21s in October 2014. He made his debut as a 60th-minute substitute and did not concede in his time on the pitch. The game finished 4–1 to Norway. He made his first start for the team in a 1–0 defeat to United States U21s.

Rogers received his first call-up to the senior Republic of Ireland side for the 2018 FIFA World Cup qualifiers against Georgia and Moldova in October 2016.

== Career statistics ==
As of match played 3 July 2026

Club	Season	League			National Cup (Note: Includes Scottish Cup, FA Cup & FAI Cup)		League Cup (Note: Includes Scottish League Cup & EFL Cup)		Europe		Other		Total	
Club	Season	Division	Apps	Goals	Apps	Goals	Apps	Goals	Apps	Goals	Apps	Goals	Apps	Goals
Aberdeen	2011–12	Scottish Premier League	0	0	0	0	0	0	–		–		0	0
Aberdeen	2012–13	Scottish Premier League	0	0	0	0	0	0	–		–		0	0
Aberdeen	2013–14	Scottish Premiership	0	0	0	0	0	0	–		–		0	0
Aberdeen	2014–15	Scottish Premiership	0	0	–		–		0 (Note: Appearances in the UEFA Europa League)	0	–		0	0
Aberdeen	2015–16	Scottish Premiership	0	0	–		–		–		–		0	0
Aberdeen	2016–17	Scottish Premiership	0	0	–		–		0	0	–		0	0
Aberdeen	2017–18	Scottish Premiership	3	0	0	0	0	0	0	0	–		3	0
Aberdeen	2018–19	Scottish Premiership	0	0	–		–		–		–		0	0
Aberdeen	2019–20	Scottish Premiership	0	0	–		–		0	0	–		0	0
Aberdeen	Total		3	0	0	0	0	0	0	0	–		3	0
Airdrieonians (loan)	2013–14	Scottish League One	6	0	–		–		–		–		6	0
Dumbarton (loan)	2014–15	Scottish Championship	34	0	0	0	2	0	–		–		36	0
Falkirk (loan)	2015–16	Scottish Championship	35	0	1	0	3	0	–		5 (Note: 1 appearances in the Scottish Challenge Cup & 4 appearances in the Scottish Premiership play-offs)	0	44	0
Falkirk (loan)	2016–17	Scottish Championship	28	0	1	0	3	0	–		0 (Note: Appearances in the Scottish Challenge Cup & in the Scottish Premiership play-offs)	0	32	0
Falkirk (loan)	Total		63	0	2	0	6	0	–		5	0	76	0
St Mirren (loan)	2018–19	Scottish Premiership	4	0	0	0	1	0	–		–		5	0
Greenock Morton (loan)	2019–20	Scottish Championship	20	0	3	0	1	0	–		0 (Note: Appearances in the Scottish Challenge Cup)	0	24	0
Kilmarnock	2020–21	Scottish Premiership	27	0	0	0	0	0	–		0 (Note: Appearances in the Scottish Premiership play-offs)	0	27	0
Oldham Athletic	2021–22	EFL League Two	22	0	0	0	1	0	–		1 (Note: Appearances in the EFL Trophy)	0	24	0
St Patrick's Athletic	2022	LOI Premier Division	10	0	–		–		–		–		10	0
St Patrick's Athletic	2023	LOI Premier Division	0	0	0	0	–		0 (Note: Appearances in the UEFA Europa Conference League)	0	1 (Note: Appearances in the Leinster Senior Cup)	0	1	0
St Patrick's Athletic	2024	LOI Premier Division	20	0	0	0	–		0 (Note: Appearances in the UEFA Conference League)	0	4	0	24	0
St Patrick's Athletic	2025	LOI Premier Division	0	0	1	0	–		0	0	5	0	6	0
St Patrick's Athletic	2026	LOI Premier Division	4	0	0	0	—		—		1	0	5	0
St Patrick's Athletic	Total		34	0	1	0	–		0	0	11	0	46	0
Career total			213	0	6	0	11	0	0	0	17	0	247	0

== Honours ==
St Patrick's Athletic

- FAI Cup (1): 2023
- Leinster Senior Cup (1): 2023–24
