= Johan Brannefalk =

Swedish footballer

Personal information
- Date of birth: 9 December 1997 (age 28)
- Place of birth: Sweden
- Height: 1.79 m (5 ft 10 in)
- Positions: Midfielder; right back

Team information
- Current team: Trelleborg
- Number: 2

Youth career
- Kvarnby
- –2016: Malmö

Senior career*
Years	Team	Apps	(Gls)
2016	→ Trelleborg (loan)	11	(0)
2016–2018	Trelleborg	36	(1)
2019–2020	Ljungskile	56	(4)
2021–2022	Norrby	56	(1)
2023	Sligo Rovers	32	(0)
2024–2025	Ariana	52	(3)
2026–	Trelleborg	20	(2)
- * Club domestic league appearances and goals as of 16 November 2026

Johan Brannefalk (born 9 December 1997) is a Swedish footballer who plays as a midfielder or right back for Ettan Södra club Trelleborg.

== Career ==
Brannefalk left Trelleborg at the end of 2018, together with four other teammates. On 31 January 2019, he then joined Ljungskile.

On 19 January 2021, Brannefalk signed a two-year contract with Norrby.

On 14 November 2022, it was announced that Brannefalk had signed for League of Ireland Premier Division club Sligo Rovers for the 2023 season. He was released by the club at the end of the season, after making 32 league appearances.
