= 2023 FAI Cup final =

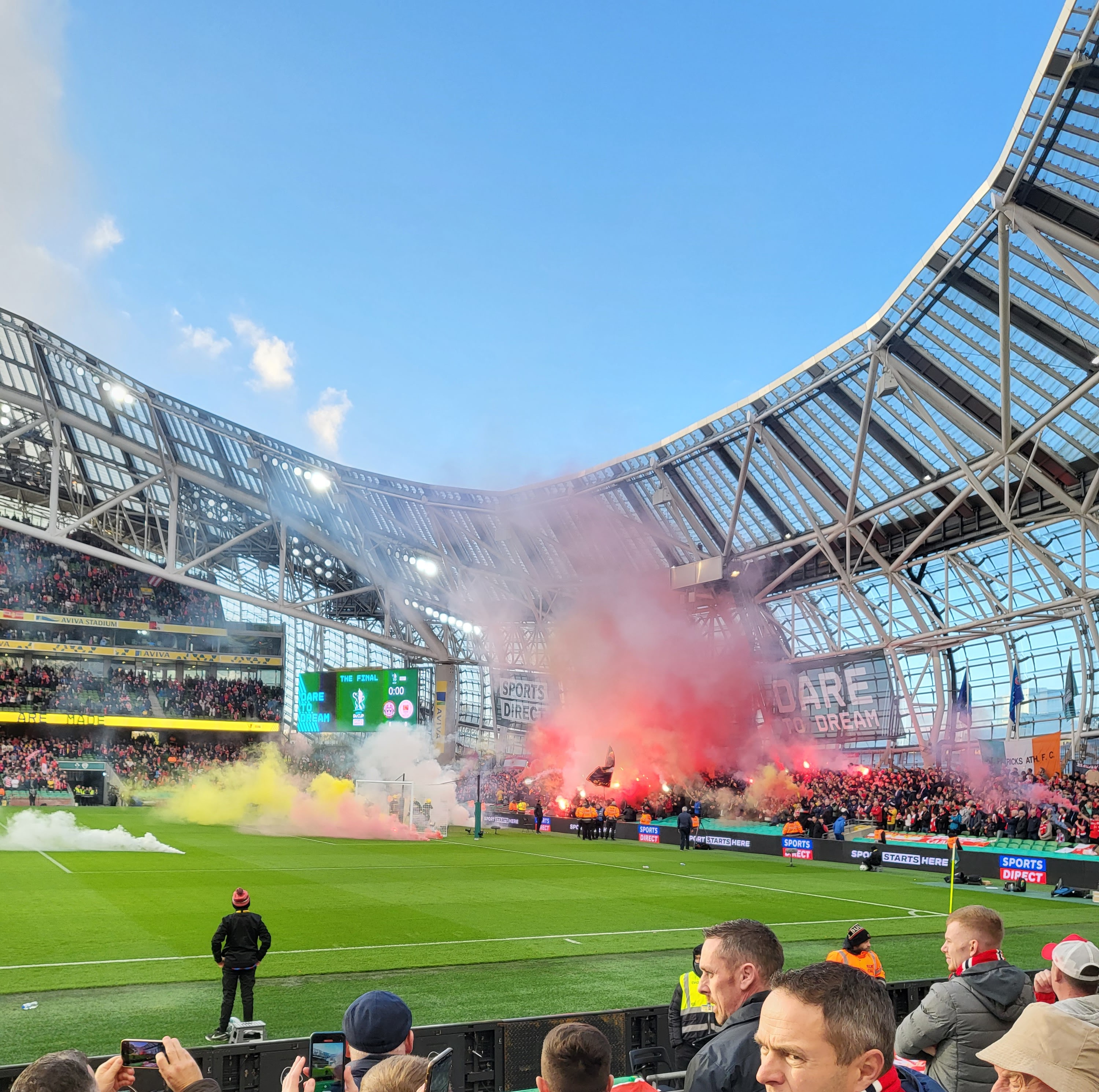
- St Pats fans before kickoff at the 2023 final
- Event: 2023 FAI Cup
Bohemians	St Patrick's Athletic
1	3
- Date: 12 November 2023
- Venue: Aviva Stadium, Dublin
- Man of the Match: Jamie Lennon (St Patrick's Athletic)
- Referee: Paul McLaughlin
- Attendance: 43,881
- Weather: Sunny; 12 °C (54 °F)

The 2023 FAI Cup final, known as the 2023 Sports Direct FAI Cup final for sponsorship reasons, was the final match of the 2023 FAI Cup, the national association football cup of the Republic of Ireland. The match took place on Sunday 12 November 2023 at the Aviva Stadium in Dublin, between Bohemians and St Patrick's Athletic.

St Patrick's Athletic won 3–1 to win their fifth FAI Cup and qualify for the second qualifying round of the 2024–25 UEFA Conference League. The final set the record as the highest-attended FAI Cup final at 43,881, breaking the 1945 record of 41,238. The attendance was also a new record for a domestic game.

== Route to the final ==
=== Bohemians ===
21 July 2023	Bohemians	1–0	Shelbourne	Phibsborough
19:45	Afolabi 32'	Report		Stadium: Dalymount Park; Attendance: 4,168; Referee: Paul McLaughlin

18 August 2023	Bohemians	6–0	Rockmount	Phibsborough
19:45	Clarke 18' 45+1'; Afolabi 23'; McDaid 55'; Twardek 66'; McDonnell 85'	Report		Stadium: Dalymount Park; Attendance: 2,746; Referee: David Dunne

15 September 2023	Drogheda United	1–3	Bohemians	Drogheda
19:45	Brennan 50' (pen.)	Report	Nowak 44'; Afolabi 56' 90' (pen.)	Stadium: Weavers Park; Attendance: 2,344; Referee: Damien MacGraith

7 October 2023	Galway United	0–1	Bohemians	Galway
14:40		Report	Connolly 44'; Radkowski (red card) 59'	Stadium: Eamonn Deacy Park; Attendance: 4,300; Referee: Neil Doyle

=== St Patrick's Athletic ===
23 July 2023	Longford Town	1–2	St Patrick's Athletic	Longford
18:00	Boudiaf 78'; Hand (red card) 81'; Brady (red card) 91'	Report	Murphy 64'; Forrester 80' (pen.)	Stadium: Bishopsgate; Attendance: 1,164; Referee: Rob Hennessy

20 August 2023	Derry City	0–0 (a.e.t.) (3–4 p)	St Patrick's Athletic	Derry
17:00	P.McEleney (penalty scored); B.Kavanagh (penalty scored); Mullen (penalty scored); Duffy (penalty missed); Connolly (penalty missed)	Report	Forrester (penalty scored); Nolan (penalty scored); Mulraney (penalty missed); Leavy (penalty scored); Melia (penalty scored)	Stadium: Brandywell Stadium; Attendance: 3,267; Referee: Neil Doyle

15 September 2023	Finn Harps	1–2	St Patrick's Athletic	Ballybofey
20:00	O'Donnell 24'	Report	Forrester 48' (pen.); Lonergan 85'	Stadium: Finn Park; Attendance: 1,351; Referee: Rob Harvey

8 October 2023	Cork City	0–2	St Patrick's Athletic	Cork
14:40		Report	Doyle 12'; Carty 83'	Stadium: Turners Cross; Attendance: 6,355; Referee: Rob Harvey

== Match ==
=== Summary ===
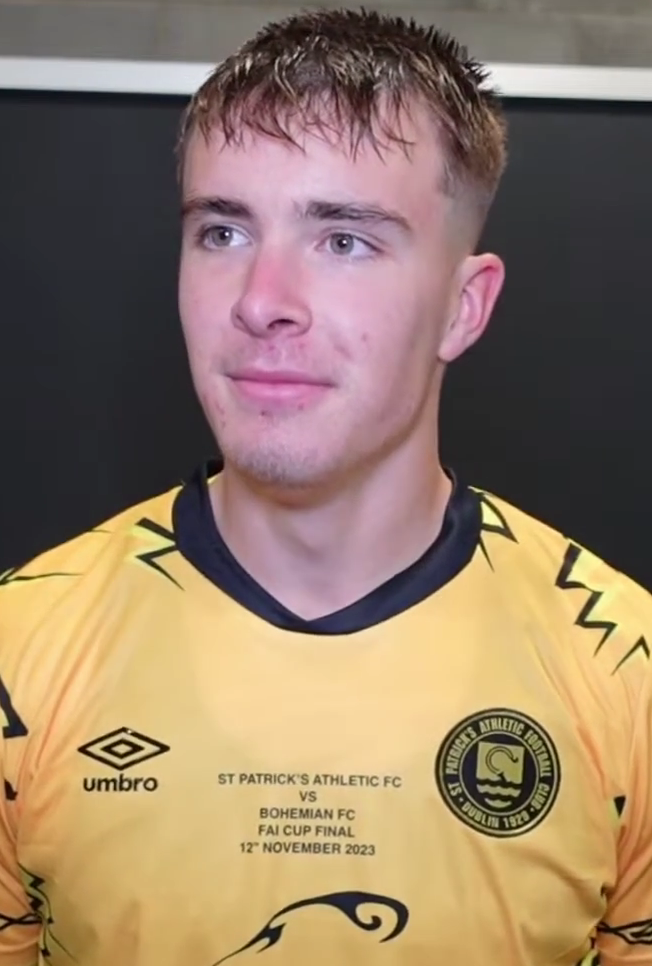
Goalscorer Tommy Lonergan after the match.

In the 7th minute, Bohemians were awarded a penalty when Jonathan Afolabi was fouled inside the penalty box by Anthony Breslin, Afolabi took the penalty, sending the goalkeeper the wrong way and scoring with a low shot to the right corner. In the 23rd minute Mark Doyle made it 1-1 when he headed the ball into the left corner of the net from six yards out after a free-kick from Jake Mulraney on the right wing. Three minutes into the second half, St Patrick's Athletic took the lead when Krystian Nowak scored an own goal, the ball going into the right corner of the net off his outstretched right foot at the back post after another free-kick from Jake Mulraney on the right. It was 3-1 in the 87th minute when Tommy Lonergan scored, curling the ball into the left of the net from outside the penalty area after he got the ball from a mistake by Bohemians captain Jordan Flores.

=== Details ===
12 November 2023
15:00

Bohemians	1–3	St Patrick's Athletic
Afolabi 9' (pen.)	Report	Doyle 23'; Nowak 48' (o.g.); Lonergan 87'

Aviva Stadium, Dublin
Attendance: 43,881
Referee: Paul McLaughlin

Bohemians	St Patrick's Athletic

GK	1	(Republic of Ireland) James Talbot
RB	2	(Poland) Bartłomiej Kukułowicz	(yellow card) 90+4'
CB	5	(Poland) Krystian Nowak	48' (o.g.)
CB	24	(Republic of Ireland) Cian Byrne
LB	6	(England) Jordan Flores (c)
CM	15	(Republic of Ireland) James Clarke
CM	14	(Republic of Ireland) James McManus	(yellow card) 47'	(substituted off) 52'
CM	17	(Republic of Ireland) Adam McDonnell		(substituted off) 85'
RW	10	(Republic of Ireland) Dylan Connolly
ST	9	(Republic of Ireland) Jonathan Afolabi	9' (pen.)
LW	12	(Republic of Ireland) Danny Grant		(substituted off) 68'
Substitutes:
GK	25	(United States) Luke Dennison
LB	3	(Republic of Ireland) Paddy Kirk	(substituted on) 52'
CB	5	(England) Louie Holzman
LW	7	(Scotland) Declan McDaid
CM	8	(Scotland) Ali Coote	(substituted on) 68'
ST	11	(England) James Akintunde
CM	18	(Republic of Ireland) John O'Sullivan	(substituted on) 85'
ST	22	(Republic of Ireland) Dean Williams
RW	23	(Canada) Kris Twardek
Manager:
(Northern Ireland) Declan Devine

GK	36	(England) Dean Lyness
RB	22	(Republic of Ireland) Sam Curtis
CB	4	(Republic of Ireland) Joe Redmond (c)
CB	13	(Canada) David Norman Jr.	(yellow card) 73'
LB	3	(Republic of Ireland) Anthony Breslin
CM	6	(Republic of Ireland) Jamie Lennon
CM	8	(Republic of Ireland) Chris Forrester		(substituted off) 68'
CM	17	(Republic of Ireland) Kian Leavy		(substituted off) 75'
RW	20	(Republic of Ireland) Jake Mulraney		(substituted off) 68'
ST	15	(Republic of Ireland) Conor Carty		(substituted off) 75'
LW	14	(Republic of Ireland) Mark Doyle	23'	(substituted off) 57'
Substitutes:
GK	1	(Republic of Ireland) Danny Rogers
ST	10	(Republic of Ireland) Tommy Lonergan	(substituted on) 75'	86'	(yellow card) 86'
RW	11	(Republic of Ireland) Jason McClelland	(substituted on) 68'
CM	18	(Republic of Ireland) Ben McCormack
LW	19	(Republic of Ireland) Alex Nolan	(substituted on) 75'
CM	24	(Republic of Ireland) Adam Murphy	(substituted on) 68'
CM	25	(Netherlands) Thijs Timmermans
CB	26	(Republic of Ireland) Jay McGrath
ST	41	(Republic of Ireland) Mason Melia	(substituted on) 57'
Manager:
(Republic of Ireland) Jon Daly
