= 2024 President of Ireland's Cup =

- Event: President of Ireland's Cup
Shamrock Rovers	St Patrick's Athletic
3	1
- Date: 9 February 2024
- Venue: Tallaght Stadium, Tallaght
- Referee: Damien MacGraith
- Attendance: 8,053

The 2024 President of Ireland's Cup was the tenth edition of the President of Ireland's Cup. The match was played on 9 February between the champions of the 2023 League of Ireland Premier Division and the 2023 FAI Cup winners, Shamrock Rovers and St Patrick's Athletic at Tallaght Stadium. Shamrock Rovers won 3–1 with all of the game's goals coming in the second half. A brace from substitute Trevor Clarke either side of a Josh Honohan header gave Rovers a 3–0 lead before Jamie Lennon scored an injury time consolation goal for Pat's.

== Details ==
9 February 2024
20:00 GMT

Shamrock Rovers	3–1	St Patrick's Athletic
Trevor Clarke 54'; Josh Honohan 62'; Trevor Clarke 89'	Report	Jamie Lennon 90+3'

Tallaght Stadium
Attendance: 8,053
Referee: Damien MacGraith

Shamrock Rovers	St Patrick's Athletic

GK	1	(Germany) Leon Pöhls
RWB	23	(Republic of Ireland) Neil Farrugia	(substituted off) 46'
CB	6	(Republic of Ireland) Daniel Cleary	(substituted off) 46'
CB	3	(Republic of Ireland) Seán Hoare	(substituted off) 75'
CB	2	(Republic of Ireland) Josh Honohan	(yellow card) 13'	62'
LWB	11	(Republic of Ireland) Seán Kavanagh	(substituted off) 46'
CM	19	(Estonia) Markus Poom	(substituted off) 63'
CM	15	(Republic of Ireland) Darragh Nugent	(yellow card) 11'
RW	21	(Republic of Ireland) Darragh Burns	(yellow card) 90+1'
ST	9	(Republic of Ireland) Aaron Greene (c)	(substituted off) 46'
LW	34	(Republic of Ireland) Conan Noonan	(yellow card) 44'
Substitutes:
GK	25	(Republic of Ireland) Lee Steacy
CB	5	(Republic of Ireland) Lee Grace	(substituted in) 46'
CM	7	(Republic of Ireland) Dylan Watts	(substituted in) 46'
ST	10	(Republic of Ireland) Graham Burke
CM	16	(Republic of Ireland) Gary O'Neill	(substituted in) 46'
LWB	18	(Republic of Ireland) Trevor Clarke	(substituted in) 46'	54'	89'
ST	20	(Republic of Ireland) Rory Gaffney	(substituted in) 46'
LW	28	(Republic of Ireland) Gideon Tetteh
RW	38	(Republic of Ireland) Cian Barrett	(substituted in) 75'
Manager:
(Republic of Ireland) Stephen Bradley

GK	13	(Brazil) Marcelo Pitaluga
RB	16	(Republic of Ireland) Aaron Bolger	(substituted off) 62'
CB	4	(Republic of Ireland) Joe Redmond (c)
CB	22	(Republic of Ireland) Conor Keeley	(yellow card) 61'
LB	3	(Republic of Ireland) Anthony Breslin
CM	6	(Republic of Ireland) Jamie Lennon	(yellow card) 35'	90+3'
CM	8	(Republic of Ireland) Chris Forrester	(substituted off) 58'
CAM	10	(Republic of Ireland) Kian Leavy	(substituted off) 83'
RW	14	(Republic of Ireland) Brandon Kavanagh	(substituted off) 62'
ST	7	(Republic of Ireland) Ruairí Keating	(substituted off) 83'
LW	20	(Republic of Ireland) Jake Mulraney	(substituted off) 75'
Substitutes:
GK	1	(Republic of Ireland) Danny Rogers
ST	9	(Republic of Ireland) Mason Melia	(substituted in) 83'
LW	11	(Republic of Ireland) Jason McClelland	(substituted in) 86'
ST	12	(Republic of Ireland) Cian Kavanagh	(substituted in) 86'
CM	15	(England) Arran Pettifer
CB	18	(England) Alfie Taylor
LW	19	(Republic of Ireland) Alex Nolan	(substituted in) 83'
RB	21	(Sweden) Axel Sjöberg	(substituted in) 75'
CB	24	(Republic of Ireland) Luke Turner	(substituted in) 62'
Manager:
(Republic of Ireland) Jon Daly

== See also ==
- 2024 League of Ireland Premier Division
- 2024 FAI Cup
- 2024 St Patrick's Athletic F.C. season
