= Dare Kareem =

Nigerian-Irish footballer

Personal information
- Full name: Fuhad Dare Kareem
- Date of birth: 17 January 2006 (age 20)
- Place of birth: Dublin, Ireland
- Height: 1.85 m (6 ft 1 in)
- Position: Striker

Team information
- Current team: Drogheda United

Youth career
- 2021–2022: UCD
- 2023–2024: St Patrick's Athletic
- 2025: Drogheda United

Senior career*
Years	Team	Apps	(Gls)
2024	St Patrick's Athletic	0	(0)
2025–	Drogheda United	25	(3)
2026–	→ Treaty United (loan)	13	(2)
- * Club domestic league appearances and goals as of 23:31, 10 November 2026 (UTC)

Fuhad Dare Kareem (born 17 January 2006) is a Nigerian-Irish professional footballer who plays for League of Ireland First Division club Drogheda United, having previously played for St Patrick's Athletic and Treaty United.

== Club career ==
=== Early career ===
Kareem played with the U15 side of UCD, before joining St Patrick's Athletic's academy in 2023, where he played for the club's U17 and U19 sides, before playing with the U20s in 2024.

=== St Patrick's Athletic ===
On 3 February 2024, Kareem made his debut in senior football, replacing Cian Kavanagh from the bench in the 87th minute of a 2–2 draw away to St Mochta's in the Leinster Senior Cup, which proved to be his only involvement with the first team, with Aidan Keena, Mason Melia, Cian Kavanagh and Michael Noonan all ahead of him in the pecking order as strikers at the club.

=== Drogheda United ===
Kareem signed for the U20 side of fellow League of Ireland Premier Division club Drogheda United in January 2025. He made his first team debut for the club on 3 February 2025, in a 2–0 loss to St Mochta's in the Leinster Senior Cup. Kareem made his League of Ireland Premier Division debut on 14 March 2025, coming off the bench in a 2–1 defeat at home to Shamrock Rovers. He made his first start for the club on 4 July 2025 and scored his first goal in senior football, in a 1–0 victory at home to Galway United. During the July mid-season break, with Kareem not signed on a professional contract yet, he went on trial with EFL League One club Northampton Town. On 26 July 2025, Kareem signed his first professional contract with Drogheda. On 22 September 2025, Kareem scored the opening goal of the game from 20 yards in a 2–1 victory over Shelbourne.

==== Treaty United loan ====
On 21 July 2026, in search of more regular minutes, Kareem was loaned out to League of Ireland First Division club Treaty United.

== Career statistics ==
As of match played 16 October 2026

Club	Season	League			National Cup		Europe		Other		Total	
Club	Season	Division	Apps	Goals	Apps	Goals	Apps	Goals	Apps	Goals	Apps	Goals
St Patrick's Athletic	2024	LOI Premier Division	0	0	0	0	0 (Note: Appearance(s) in the UEFA Conference League)	0	1 (Note: Appearance(s) in Leinster Senior Cup)	0	1	0
Drogheda United	2025	LOI Premier Division	16	3	3	0	–		2	0	21	3
Drogheda United	2026	LOI Premier Division	12	0	0	0	–		2	0	14	0
Drogheda United	Total		28	3	3	0	0	0	4	0	35	3
Treaty United	2026	LOI First Division	13	2	–		–		–		13	2
Career Total			41	5	3	0	0	0	5	0	49	5
