= Jamie Lennon =

Irish association footballer

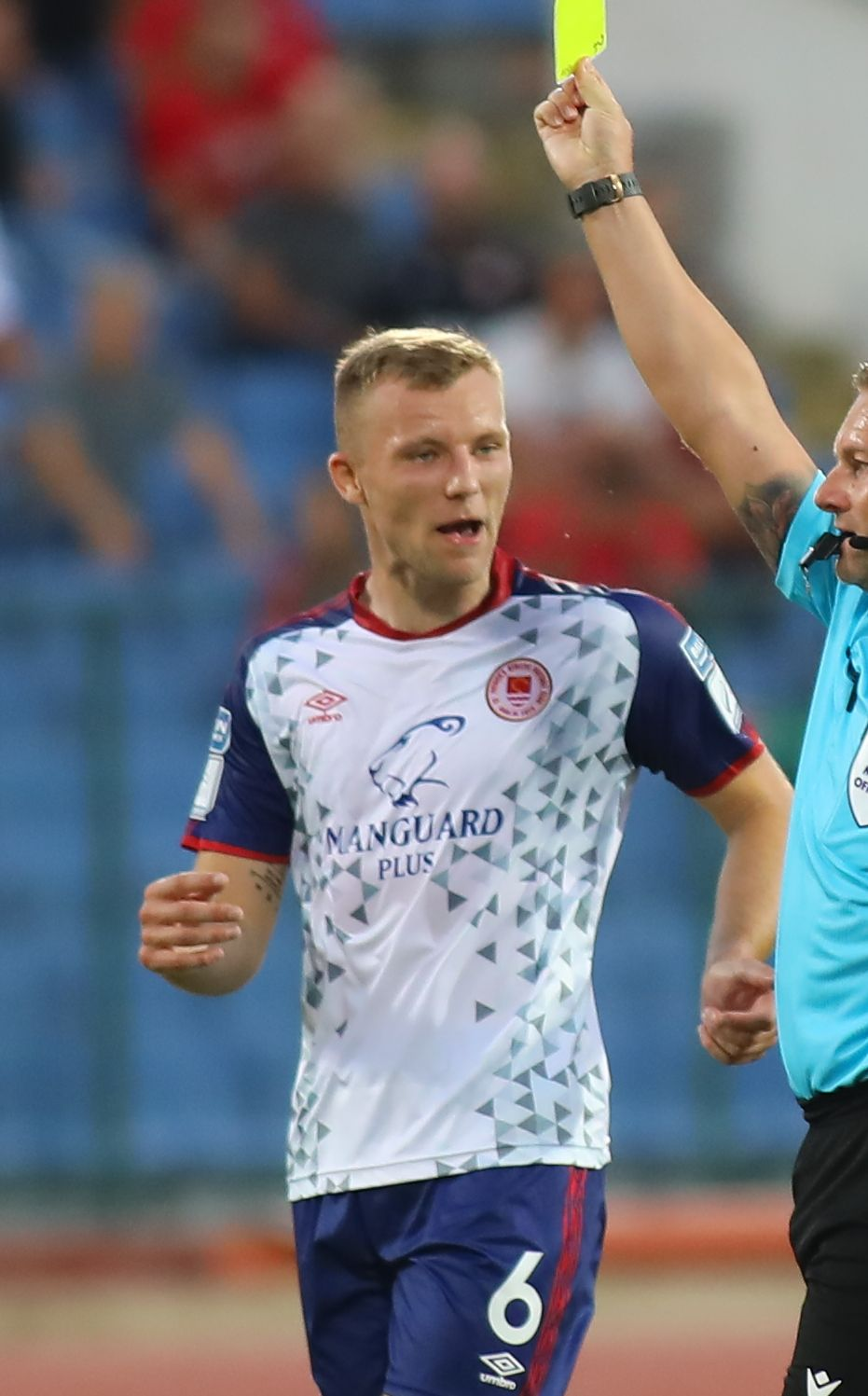
- Lennon in action for St Patrick's Athletic in 2022.

Personal information
- Full name: Jamie Lennon
- Date of birth: 9 May 1998 (age 28)
- Place of birth: Santry, Dublin, Ireland
- Height: 1.78 m (5 ft 10 in)
- Position: Centre midfielder

Team information
- Current team: St Patrick's Athletic
- Number: 6

Youth career
- 2009–2015: Shelbourne
- 2016–2017: St Patrick's Athletic

Senior career*
Years	Team	Apps	(Gls)
2017–	St Patrick's Athletic	239	(6)

International career^{‡}
2019–2020	Republic of Ireland U21	4	(1)
- * Club domestic league appearances and goals as of 23:43, 30 October 2026 (UTC) ‡ National team caps and goals as of 18 November 2020

Jamie Lennon (born 9 May 1998) is an Irish professional footballer playing for League of Ireland Premier Division club St Patrick's Athletic, the club where he started his professional career.

== Club career ==
=== Youth career ===
Lennon spent seven years in the youth setup of Shelbourne but was let go ahead of his first year at under 19 level. It was then that he made the move to Dublin rivals St Patrick's Athletic in 2016, where he played at under 19 level for two years. At Pats he captained the side as they reached the league final but lost out to Bohemians at Dalymount Park on 1 November 2017.

=== St Patrick's Athletic ===
Lennon made his first team debut on 8 August 2017, starting a Leinster Senior Cup game against Firhouse Clover, scoring after 15 minutes when he smashed a shot into the top corner from 30 yards to help his side to a 2–1 win. He went on to make a second first team appearance that season, playing the full 90 minutes again as Pats lost 1–0 to Shelbourne in the next round of the Leinster Senior Cup On 19 December 2017, ahead of the 2018 season Lennon signed his first professional contract with the first team.

Lennon made his League of Ireland Premier Division debut on 26 February 2018 in a 2–0 loss to Waterford, replacing Owen Garvan after 50 minutes. His first league start came in Pats next game, a 1–0 win away to Bohemians. After his first start, he cemented his place in the team earning great plaudits from manager Liam Buckley as he ended the season with 36 appearances in all competitions with all but 3 of those being in the starting XI, as the Saints finished up in 5th place. For his performances, Lennon was voted as St Patrick's Athletic Young Player of the Year by the club's supporters.

On 7 December 2018 it was announced that Lennon had signed a contract extension for the 2019 season.

On 28 November 2021 Lennon was part of the starting XI in the 2021 FAI Cup Final, beating rivals Bohemians 4–3 on penalties following a 1–1 draw after extra time in front of a record FAI Cup Final crowd of 37,126 at the Aviva Stadium.

Lennon started in the 2022 President of Ireland's Cup against Shamrock Rovers at Tallaght Stadium on 11 February 2022, as his side lost 5–4 on penalties after a 1–1 draw.

On 21 November 2022, it was announced that Lennon had signed a new multi-year contract with the club, turning down interest from clubs in the United States and other countries to stay at the club where he started his career.

On 7 April 2023, Lennon scored his first league goal for the club in a 4–0 win over Cork City at Richmond Park, ending a goal drought of 143 competitive games, dating back to his debut for the club in 2017. Lennon made his 150th appearance in all competitions for the club on 12 May 2023, in a 3–0 win over Drogheda United.

On 12 November 2023, Lennon was part of the starting XI in the 2023 FAI Cup Final, earning the Man of the Match award in a 3–1 win over Bohemians in front of a record breaking FAI Cup Final crowd of 43,881 at the Aviva Stadium.

Lennon started the 2024 season in goalscoring form, scoring a consolation goal in injury time of the 2024 President of Ireland's Cup, before scoring in a 1–0 win over Galway United a week later on 16 February 2024, in the opening game of the season. On 3 June 2024, Lennon scored his side's second goal in a 3–2 loss to Dundalk, blasting home a volley from a Cian Kavanagh knockdown from a corner. Lennon made his 200th appearance for the club on 28 June 2024 in a 0–0 draw at home to Bohemians. On 1 November 2024, Lennon signed a new long-term contract with the club, again turning down offers from clubs in the United States.

On 16 May 2025, Lennon scored a 95th-minute winner in a 3–2 victory over Cork City at Richmond Park, just 6 minutes after his side had equalised. On 29 August 2025, Lennon made his 200th league appearance for the club, in a 2–2 draw away to Derry City at the Ryan McBride Brandywell Stadium.

On 24 April 2026, Lennon gave his side the lead in an eventual 3–1 victory at home to Dublin rivals Bohemians.

== Style of play ==
Lennon is a defensive midfielder and in November 2024 was described by his St Patrick's Athletic (and former Republic of Ireland) manager Stephen Kenny as having a similar play style to Ballon D'Or winner Rodri, with Kenny stating "There's not many players like him. He is a conventional number 6 but much more than that. He's our Rodri, in terms of the job he does. Jamie has without doubt, in my opinion, got the capacity to show he is one of the best players in the league over the next number of years."

== International career ==
On 24 January 2019, Lennon was called up to a Republic of Ireland U21 home-based squad by newly appointed manager Stephen Kenny, for a friendly against the Ireland Amateur squad. Lennon received great plaudits as he captained the side as they won 1–0 at Whitehall Stadium on 6 February 2019. On 13 March 2019, Lennon was named in his first competitive underage international side as he was called up to the full Republic of Ireland U21 side for their 2021 UEFA European Under-21 Championship qualification game against Luxembourg U21 at Tallaght Stadium. Lennon came off the bench for Jayson Molumby in the 77th minute of a 3–0 win to earn his first international cap. On 21 May 2019, Lennon was called up to the Ireland Under-21 squad for the prestigious 2019 Toulon Tournament in France where they were drawn against China, Mexico and Bahrain. On 18 November 2020, Lennon scored his first international goal in his last underage international game, scoring the winner away to Luxembourg in a UEFA European Under-21 Championship qualifier.

== Career statistics ==
As of match played 30 October 2026

Appearances and goals by club, season and competition
Club	Season	League			Cup		League Cup		Europe		Other		Total	
Club	Season	Division	Apps	Goals	Apps	Goals	Apps	Goals	Apps	Goals	Apps	Goals	Apps	Goals
St Patrick's Athletic	2017	LOI Premier Division	0	0	0	0	0	0	—		2 (Note: Appearances in Leinster Senior Cup)	1	2	1
St Patrick's Athletic	2018	LOI Premier Division	29	0	2	0	1	0	—		4	0	36	0
St Patrick's Athletic	2019	LOI Premier Division	28	0	1	0	0	0	2 (Note: Appearances in UEFA Europa League)	0	0	0	31	0
St Patrick's Athletic	2020	LOI Premier Division	16	0	1	0	—		—		—		17	0
St Patrick's Athletic	2021	LOI Premier Division	28	0	5	0	—		—		—		33	0
St Patrick's Athletic	2022	LOI Premier Division	12	0	1	0	—		4 (Note: Appearances in UEFA Europa Conference League)	0	1 (Note: Appearance in the President of Ireland's Cup)	0	18	0
St Patrick's Athletic	2023	LOI Premier Division	31	1	5	0	—		2	0	0	0	38	1
St Patrick's Athletic	2024	LOI Premier Division	34	2	1	0	—		6 (Note: Appearance(s) in the UEFA Conference League)	0	2 (Note: 1 appearance, 1 goal in the President of Ireland's Cup & 1 appearance in the Leinster Senior Cup)	1	43	3
St Patrick's Athletic	2025	LOI Premier Division	29	1	3	0	—		6	0	1	0	39	1
St Patrick's Athletic	2026	LOI Premier Division	32	2	3	0	—		—		0	0	35	2
Career total			239	6	22	0	1	0	20	0	10	2	292	8

== Honours ==
=== Club ===
St Patrick's Athletic

- FAI Cup (2): 2021, 2023
- Leinster Senior Cup (2): 2018–19, 2023–24

=== Individual ===
- St Patrick's Athletic Young Player of the Year (1): 2018
