= 2024 St Patrick's Athletic F.C. season =

St Patrick's Athletic F.C.
2024 season
- Chairman: Garrett Kelleher
- Manager: Jon Daly (until 7 May); Seán O'Connor (as interim from 7 May – 16 May); Stephen Kenny (from 16 May)
- Stadium: Richmond Park, Inchicore, Dublin 8
- League of Ireland Premier Division: 3rd
- FAI Cup: Second Round (Eliminated by Derry City)
- UEFA Conference League: Play-off Round (Eliminated by İstanbul Başakşehir)
- Leinster Senior Cup: Champions
- President of Ireland's Cup: Runners-up (to Shamrock Rovers)
- Top goalscorer: League: Jake Mulraney (7 goals); All: Jake Mulraney (9 goals)
- Highest home attendance: 6,064 vs İstanbul Başakşehir (22 August)
- Lowest home attendance: 650 (Est.) vs Maynooth University Town (17 September)
Home colours	Away colours	Third colours

The 2024 season was St Patrick's Athletic F.C.'s 95th year in existence and was the Supersaint's 73rd consecutive season in the top-flight of Irish football. It was the first full season in charge for manager Jon Daly, having taken over from Tim Clancy in May 2023. Pre-season training for the squad began in December 2023. The fixtures were released on 15 December 2023, with Pat's down to play away to newly promoted Galway United on the opening night of the season.

A week before the first game of the season, they were comprehensively beaten 3–1 away to Shamrock Rovers in the President of Ireland's Cup. Following a bad start to the campaign, Daly was sacked on 7 May, with the Republic of Ireland national team's most recent manager Stephen Kenny appointed on 16 May. Having won the FAI Cup in 2023, the club were defending their title in 2024, but were defeated at the first hurdle away to eventual runners-up Derry City. Their UEFA Conference League campaign was more successful however, as they were narrowly defeated in the Play-Off Round by İstanbul Başakşehir, having beaten Vaduz and Sabah in previous rounds. On 8 October, the club won its tenth Leinster Senior Cup, after beating St Mochta's in the final. With the side in 8th place at the start of September, Kenny guided them to a club record equalling 9 consecutive league victories, beating every club in the league to finish the season in 3rd place, securing a UEFA Conference League spot for the following season.

== Squad ==
No.	Name	Position(s)	Nationality	Hometown	Date of birth (age)	Previous club	Year signed	Club apps.	Club goals
Goalkeepers
1	Danny Rogers	GK	(Republic of Ireland)	(United States) New York City, New York State	23 March 1994 (age 32)	(England) Oldham Athletic	2022	35	0
13	Marcelo Pitaluga	GK	(Brazil)	Niterói, Rio de Janeiro	20 December 2002 (age 23)	(England) Liverpool	2024	7	0
29	Matt Boylan	GK	(Republic of Ireland)	(England) Welwyn Garden City, Hertfordshire	4 July 2004 (age 22)	(England) Bromley	2023	0	0
40	Adam Banim	GK	(Republic of Ireland)	Dublin	13 November 2005 (age 21)	(Republic of Ireland) St Patrick's Athletic Academy	2024	0	0
43	Shaun Hall	GK	(Republic of Ireland)	Newbridge, Kildare	16 June 2007 (age 19)	(Republic of Ireland) St Patrick's Athletic Academy	2024	0	0
48	Darragh Mooney	GK	(Republic of Ireland)	Dublin	8 December 2004 (age 21)	(Republic of Ireland) St Patrick's Athletic Academy	2023	0	0
94	Joseph Anang	GK	(Ghana)	Teshie, Accra	8 June 2000 (age 26)	(England) West Ham United	2024	49	0
Defenders
2	Kieran Freeman	RB	(Scotland)	Aberdeen, Aberdeenshire	30 March 2000 (age 26)	(Scotland) Dundee United	2024	9	0
3	Anthony Breslin	LB	(Republic of Ireland)	Blanchardstown, Dublin	13 February 1997 (age 29)	(Republic of Ireland) Bohemians	2022	120	3
4	Joe Redmond	CB	(Republic of Ireland)	Tallaght, Dublin	21 January 2000 (age 26)	(Republic of Ireland) Drogheda United	2022	108	9
5	Tom Grivosti	CB	(England)	West Derby, Liverpool	15 June 1999 (age 27)	(Scotland) Ross County	2022	66	3
18	Alfie Taylor	CB	(England)	Kingston upon Hull, East Yorkshire	22 February 2004 (age 22)	(England) Hull City	2024	3	1
21	Axel Sjöberg	RB	(Sweden)	Helsingborg, Skåne County	12 April 2000 (age 26)	(Sweden) BK Olympic	2023	33	0
22	Conor Keeley	CB	(Republic of Ireland)	Dunboyne, Meath	13 December 1997 (age 28)	(Republic of Ireland) Drogheda United	2024	23	1
23	Ryan McLaughlin	RB	(Northern Ireland)	Andersonstown, Belfast	30 September 1994 (age 32)	(England) Morecambe	2023	23	0
24	Luke Turner	CB	(Republic of Ireland)	Drimnagh, Dublin	20 May 2002 (age 24)	(Northern Ireland) Cliftonville	2024	33	4
30	Al-Amin Kazeem	LB	(England)	England	6 April 2002 (age 24)	(England) Colchester United	2024	13	1
33	Sean McHale	CB	(Republic of Ireland)	Dunboyne, Meath	26 March 2005 (age 21)	(Republic of Ireland) St Patrick's Athletic Academy	2023	2	0
34	Dan McHale	CB	(Republic of Ireland)	Firhouse, Dublin	1 April 2005 (age 21)	(Republic of Ireland) St Patrick's Athletic Academy	2023	2	1
37	Adam Deans	RB	(Republic of Ireland)	Tallaght, Dublin	21 November 2005 (age 20)	(Republic of Ireland) St Patrick's Athletic Academy	2024	2	0
39	Luke O'Brien	LB	(Republic of Ireland)	Lucan, Dublin	13 January 2005 (age 21)	(Republic of Ireland) St Patrick's Athletic Academy	2023	3	0
–	Eric Abudiore	CB	(Republic of Ireland)	Rathfarnham, Dublin	13 June 2004 (age 22)	(Republic of Ireland) St Patrick's Athletic Academy	2024	1	0
–	Sam Steward	CB	(Republic of Ireland)	Tyrrelstown, Dublin	13 February 2008 (age 18)	(Republic of Ireland) St Patrick's Athletic Academy	2024	1	0
–	Ivan Graminschii	LB	(Moldova)	(Republic of Ireland) Blanchardstown, Dublin	5 February 2007 (age 19)	(Republic of Ireland) St Patrick's Athletic Academy	2024	2	0
–	Billy Canny	RB	(Republic of Ireland)	Howth, Dublin	28 May 2008 (age 18)	(Republic of Ireland) St Patrick's Athletic Academy	2024	0	0
Midfielders
6	Jamie Lennon	CDM	(Republic of Ireland)	Santry, Dublin	9 May 1998 (age 28)	(Republic of Ireland) St Patrick's Athletic Academy	2017	218	5
8	Chris Forrester	CM/CAM	(Republic of Ireland)	Smithfield, Dublin	17 December 1992 (age 33)	(Scotland) Aberdeen	2019	379	83
10	Kian Leavy	CAM/LW/RW	(Republic of Ireland)	Ardee, Louth	21 March 2002 (age 24)	(England) Reading	2023	55	2
11	Jason McClelland	LW/CM/LB	(Republic of Ireland)	Templeogue, Dublin	5 March 1997 (age 29)	(Republic of Ireland) UCD	2020	128	9
14	Brandon Kavanagh	CAM/LW/RW	(Republic of Ireland)	Crumlin, Dublin	21 September 2000 (age 26)	(Republic of Ireland) Derry City	2024	40	7
15	Arran Pettifer	CM	(England)	Stockport, Greater Manchester	1 October 2003 (age 23)	(England) Bolton Wanderers	2024	1	0
16	Aaron Bolger	CDM/CM	(Republic of Ireland)	Avoca, Wicklow	3 January 2003 (age 23)	(Republic of Ireland) Cork City	2024	29	0
17	Romal Palmer	CM	(England)	Wigan, Greater Manchester	30 September 1998 (age 28)	(Turkey) Göztepe	2024	25	3
19	Alex Nolan	LW	(Republic of Ireland)	Dunboyne, Meath	20 March 2003 (age 23)	(Republic of Ireland) UCD	2023	40	2
20	Jake Mulraney	LW/RW	(Republic of Ireland)	Drimnagh, Dublin	5 April 1996 (age 30)	(United States) Orlando City	2023	76	15
26	Zack Elbouzedi	RW	(Republic of Ireland)	Swords, County Dublin	5 April 1998 (age 28)	(Sweden) AIK	2024	18	3
28	Rhys Bartley	CM	(Republic of Ireland)	Finglas, Dublin	3 March 2006 (age 20)	(Republic of Ireland) St Patrick's Athletic Academy	2023	5	0
35	Anthony Dodd	CM	(Republic of Ireland)	Killester, Dublin	19 February 2006 (age 20)	(Republic of Ireland) St Patrick's Athletic Academy	2022	4	0
36	Luke Kehir	CAM	(Republic of Ireland)	Leixlip, Kildare	2 February 2006 (age 20)	(Republic of Ireland) St Patrick's Athletic Academy	2024	1	0
38	Jason Folarin Oyenuga	RW	(Republic of Ireland)	Ongar, Dublin	20 November 2005 (age 20)	(Republic of Ireland) St Patrick's Athletic Academy	2023	4	1
44	Matthew O'Hara	CAM/CM	(Republic of Ireland)	Leixlip, Kildare	15 April 2006 (age 20)	(Republic of Ireland) St Patrick's Athletic Academy	2024	4	0
–	Jamie Gray	CM	(Republic of Ireland)	Clondalkin, Dublin	28 May 2004 (age 22)	(Republic of Ireland) St Patrick's Athletic Academy	2023	5	0
–	Billy Hayes	LW	(Republic of Ireland)	Clontarf, Dublin	6 June 2008 (age 18)	(Republic of Ireland) St Patrick's Athletic Academy	2024	1	0
–	Ruairi Morgan	CM	(Republic of Ireland)	Kildare		(Republic of Ireland) St Patrick's Athletic Academy	2024	0	0
Forwards
7	Ruairí Keating	ST	(Republic of Ireland)	Westport, Mayo	16 July 1995 (age 31)	(Republic of Ireland) Cork City	2024	24	6
9	Mason Melia	ST/RW	(Republic of Ireland)	Newtownmountkennedy, Wicklow	22 September 2007 (age 19)	(Republic of Ireland) St Patrick's Athletic Academy	2023	54	10
10	Tommy Lonergan	ST	(Republic of Ireland)	Dunboyne, Meath	2 January 2004 (age 22)	(Republic of Ireland) UCD	2023	40	6
12	Cian Kavanagh	ST	(Republic of Ireland)	Baldoyle, Dublin	3 January 2003 (age 23)	(Republic of Ireland) Derry City	2024	25	4
18	Aidan Keena	ST	(Republic of Ireland)	Mullingar, Westmeath	25 April 1999 (age 27)	(England) Cheltenham Town	2024	20	5
31	Michael Noonan	ST	(Republic of Ireland)	Rathangan, Kildare	31 July 2008 (age 18)	(Republic of Ireland) St Patrick's Athletic Academy	2024	5	3
–	Dare Kareem	ST	(Nigeria)	Dublin	17 January 2006 (age 20)	(Republic of Ireland) St Patrick's Athletic Academy	2024	1	0
–	Leo Crabb	ST	(Republic of Ireland)	Bray, Wicklow		(Republic of Ireland) St Patrick's Athletic Academy	2024	0	0

=== Transfers ===
==== Transfers in ====
Date	Position	Nationality	Name	From	Fee	Ref.
21 November 2023	CAM	(Republic of Ireland)	Brandon Kavanagh	(Republic of Ireland) Derry City	Undisclosed fee	
22 November 2023	ST	(Republic of Ireland)	Cian Kavanagh	(Republic of Ireland) Derry City	Free transfer	
23 November 2023	ST	(Republic of Ireland)	Ruairí Keating	(Republic of Ireland) Cork City	Free transfer	
13 December 2023	CM	(Republic of Ireland)	Aaron Bolger	(Republic of Ireland) Cork City	Free transfer	
15 December 2023	CB	(Republic of Ireland)	Conor Keeley	(Republic of Ireland) Drogheda United	Free transfer	
5 January 2024	GK	(Brazil)	Marcelo Pitaluga	(England) Liverpool	Loan	
9 January 2024	CB	(England)	Alfie Taylor	(England) Hull City	Loan	
30 January 2024	CB	(Republic of Ireland)	Luke Turner	(Northern Ireland) Cliftonville	Undisclosed fee+Swap	
2 February 2024	CM	(England)	Arran Pettifer	(England) Bolton Wanderers	Free transfer	
10 February 2024	CM	(England)	Romal Palmer	(Turkey) Göztepe	Loan	
21 February 2024	RB	(Scotland)	Kieran Freeman	(Scotland) Dundee United	Free transfer	
24 June 2024	GK	(Ghana)	Joseph Anang	(England) West Ham United	Free transfer	
1 July 2024	LB	(England)	Al-Amin Kazeem	(England) Colchester United	Free transfer	
17 July 2024	RW	(Republic of Ireland)	Zack Elbouzedi	(Sweden) AIK	Free transfer	
28 July 2024	ST	(Republic of Ireland)	Aidan Keena	(England) Cheltenham Town	Free transfer	

==== Transfers out ====
Date	Position	Nationality	Name	To	Fee	Ref.
21 November 2023	LW	(Republic of Ireland)	Mark Doyle	(United States) Rhode Island	Free transfer	
1 December 2023	ST	(Republic of Ireland)	Conor Carty	(England) Bolton Wanderers	End of loan	
1 December 2023	RW	(Democratic Republic of the Congo)	Serge Atakayi	Free agent	Released	
20 December 2023	CM	(Netherlands)	Thijs Timmermans	(Netherlands) ARC	Free transfer	
29 December 2023	CAM	(Republic of Ireland)	Ben McCormack	(Republic of Ireland) Waterford	Undisclosed fee	
3 January 2024	CM	(Republic of Ireland)	Adam Murphy	(England) Bristol City	Undisclosed fee	
4 January 2024	CB	(Republic of Ireland)	Jay McGrath	(England) Doncaster Rovers	Free transfer	
9 January 2024	RB	(England)	Harry Brockbank	(England) Radcliffe	Free transfer	
25 January 2024	RB	(Republic of Ireland)	Sam Curtis	(England) Sheffield United	Undisclosed fee	
26 January 2024	CM	(Republic of Ireland)	Darius Lipsiuc	(England) Stoke City	Undisclosed fee	
26 January 2024	GK	(England)	Dean Lyness	(Scotland) Hamilton Academical	Free transfer	
30 January 2024	GK	(Republic of Ireland)	David Odumosu	(Northern Ireland) Cliftonville	Undisclosed fee+Swap	
31 January 2024	CB	(Canada)	David Norman Jr.	(Canada) Vancouver	Free transfer	
1 February 2024	RB	(Republic of Ireland)	Darragh Dunne	(Sweden) Ytterhogdals IK	Free transfer	
1 February 2024	ST	(Republic of Ireland)	Tommy Lonergan	(England) Fleetwood Town	Undisclosed fee	
8 February 2024	CM	(Republic of Ireland)	James Byrne	(Republic of Ireland) Drogheda United	Free transfer	
19 February 2024	LB	(Republic of Ireland)	Luke O'Brien	(Republic of Ireland) Finn Harps	Loan	
22 February 2024	CB	(Republic of Ireland)	Sean McHale	(Republic of Ireland) Wexford	Loan	
24 June 2024	RB	(Scotland)	Kieran Freeman	(Scotland) Raith Rovers	Free transfer	
25 June 2024	CB	(England)	Alfie Taylor	(England) Hull City	Loan terminated	
29 June 2024	GK	(Brazil)	Marcelo Pitaluga	(England) Liverpool	Loan terminated	
28 July 2024	ST	(Republic of Ireland)	Ruairí Keating	(Republic of Ireland) Cork City	Free transfer	
30 August 2024	CM	(England)	Arran Pettifer	(Northern Ireland) Cliftonville	Free transfer	

=== Squad statistics ===
==== Appearances, goals and cards ====
Number in brackets represents (appearances of which were substituted ON). Last updated – 2 November 2024

No.	Player	SSE Airtricity League		FAI Cup		UEFA Conference League		Leinster Senior Cup		President of Ireland's Cup		Total	
No.	Player	Apps	Goals	Apps	Goals	Apps	Goals	Apps	Goals	Apps	Goals	Apps	Goals
1	Danny Rogers	20	0	0	0	0	0	4	0	0	0	24	0
3	Anthony Breslin	30(1)	1	1	0	6	0	1	0	1	0	40(1)	1
4	Joe Redmond	32	4	1	0	6	1	1	0	1	0	43	5
5	Tom Grivosti	14(3)	1	1	0	6	0	1	0	0	0	22(3)	1
6	Jamie Lennon	34(1)	2	1	0	6	0	1	0	1	1	43(1)	3
8	Chris Forrester	36(4)	4	1	0	6	0	2	1	1	0	46(4)	5
9	Mason Melia	31(17)	6	1	0	6(1)	0	2	1	1(1)	0	41(19)	7
10	Kian Leavy	33(13)	0	1	0	6(5)	0	2	1	1	0	43(18)	1
11	Jason McClelland	21(16)	1	1(1)	0	5(5)	0	5	0	1(1)	0	33(23)	1
12	Cian Kavanagh	18(16)	1	1(1)	0	2(2)	0	3(1)	3	1(1)	0	25(21)	4
14	Brandon Kavanagh	34(6)	6	1	0	3(3)	0	1	1	1	0	40(9)	7
16	Aaron Bolger	17(7)	0	0	0	6(6)	0	5	0	1	0	29(13)	0
17	Romal Palmer	19(14)	1	1(1)	0	5	2	0	0	0	0	25(15)	3
18	Aidan Keena	11(2)	5	0	0	4(3)	0	0	0	0	0	15(5)	5
19	Alex Nolan	22(15)	2	0	0	1(1)	0	3	0	1(1)	0	28(17)	2
20	Jake Mulraney	31(8)	7	1	0	6	2	1	0	1	0	40(8)	9
21	Axel Sjöberg	18(5)	0	1	0	6	0	0	0	1(1)	0	26(6)	0
22	Conor Keeley	19(1)	1	0	0	0	0	3	0	1	0	23(1)	1
23	Ryan McLaughlin	16(4)	0	0	0	0	0	3	0	0	0	19(4)	0
24	Luke Turner	28(3)	3	1(1)	0	0	0	3	1	1(1)	0	33(5)	4
26	Zack Elbouzedi	11(3)	1	1(1)	0	6	2	0	0	0	0	18(4)	3
28	Rhys Bartley	0	0	0	0	0	0	4(1)	0	0	0	4(1)	0
29	Matt Boylan	0	0	0	0	0	0	0	0	0	0	0	0
31	Michael Noonan	1(1)	0	0	0	0	0	4(1)	3	0	0	5(2)	3
34	Dan McHale	0	0	0	0	0	0	1(1)	1	0	0	1(1)	1
35	Anthony Dodd	0	0	0	0	0	0	3(1)	0	0	0	3(1)	0
36	Luke Kehir	0	0	0	0	0	0	1(1)	0	0	0	1(1)	0
37	Adam Deans	0	0	0	0	0	0	2(1)	0	0	0	2(1)	0
38	Jason Folarin Oyenuga	0	0	0	0	0	0	3(1)	1	0	0	3(1)	1
40	Adam Banim	0	0	0	0	0	0	0	0	0	0	0	0
43	Shaun Hall	0	0	0	0	0	0	0	0	0	0	0	0
44	Matthew O'Hara	0	0	0	0	0	0	4(4)	0	0	0	4(4)	0
48	Darragh Mooney	0	0	0	0	0	0	0	0	0	0	0	0
94	Joseph Anang	12	0	1	0	6	0	0	0	0	0	19	0
–	Jamie Gray	0	0	0	0	0	0	5(5)	0	0	0	5(5)	0
–	Eric Abudiore	0	0	0	0	0	0	1(1)	0	0	0	1(1)	0
–	Sam Steward	0	0	0	0	0	0	1(1)	0	0	0	1(1)	0
–	Dare Kareem	0	0	0	0	0	0	1(1)	0	0	0	1(1)	0
–	Ivan Graminschii	0	0	0	0	0	0	2(1)	0	0	0	2(1)	0
–	Billy Hayes	0	0	0	0	0	0	1(1)	0	0	0	1(1)	0
–	Ruairi Morgan	0	0	0	0	0	0	0	0	0	0	0	0
–	Leo Crabb	0	0	0	0	0	0	0	0	0	0	0	0
–	Billy Canny	0	0	0	0	0	0	0	0	0	0	0	0
Players that left during the season
2	Kieran Freeman	8(4)	0	0	0	0	0	1	0	0	0	9(4)	0
7	Ruairí Keating	22(4)	4	0	0	0	0	1	2	1	0	24(4)	6
10	Tommy Lonergan	0	0	0	0	0	0	1	0	0	0	1	0
13	Marcelo Pitaluga	4	0	0	0	0	0	2	0	1	0	7	0
15	Arran Pettifer	0	0	0	0	0	0	1	0	0	0	1	0
18	Alfie Taylor	0	0	0	0	0	0	3	1	0	0	3	1
33	Sean McHale	0	0	0	0	0	0	1	0	0	0	1	0
39	Luke O'Brien	0	0	0	0	0	0	2	0	0	0	2	0

==== Top scorers ====
Includes all competitive matches. Last updated 2 November 2024

Number	Name	SSE Airtricity League	FAI Cup	UEFA Conference League	Leinster Senior Cup	President of Ireland's Cup	Total
20	Jake Mulraney	7	0	2	0	0	9
14	Brandon Kavanagh	6	0	0	1	0	7
9	Mason Melia	6	0	0	1	0	7
7	Ruairí Keating	4	0	0	2	0	6
18	Aidan Keena	5	0	0	0	0	5
4	Joe Redmond	4	0	1	0	0	5
8	Chris Forrester	4	0	0	1	0	5
24	Luke Turner	3	0	0	1	0	4
12	Cian Kavanagh	1	0	0	3	0	4
17	Romal Palmer	1	0	2	0	0	3
31	Michael Noonan	0	0	0	3	0	3
26	Zack Elbouzedi	1	0	2	0	0	3
6	Jamie Lennon	2	0	0	0	1	3
19	Alex Nolan	2	0	0	0	0	2
10	Kian Leavy	0	0	0	1	0	1
30	Al-Amin Kazeem	1	0	0	0	0	1
5	Tom Grivosti	1	0	0	0	0	1
11	Jason McClelland	1	0	0	0	0	1
38	Jason Folarin Oyenuga	0	0	0	1	0	1
34	Dan McHale	0	0	0	1	0	1
18	Alfie Taylor	0	0	0	1	0	1
22	Conor Keeley	1	0	0	0	0	1
3	Anthony Breslin	1	0	0	0	0	1

==== Top assists ====
Includes all competitive matches. Last updated 2 November 2024

Number	Name	SSE Airtricity League	FAI Cup	UEFA Conference League	Leinster Senior Cup	President of Ireland's Cup	Total
14	Brandon Kavanagh	14	0	0	0	0	14
11	Jason McClelland	1	0	0	5	0	6
20	Jake Mulraney	3	0	3	0	0	6
26	Zack Elbouzedi	5	0	0	0	0	5
8	Chris Forrester	2	0	1	1	0	4
9	Mason Melia	2	0	0	2	0	4
10	Kian Leavy	2	0	0	0	0	2
4	Joe Redmond	2	0	0	0	0	2
17	Romal Palmer	1	0	1	0	0	2
12	Cian Kavanagh	2	0	0	0	0	2
6	Jamie Lennon	1	0	0	1	0	2
5	Tom Grivosti	1	0	0	0	0	1
24	Luke Turner	0	0	0	1	0	1
36	Luke Kehir	0	0	0	1	0	1
21	Axel Sjöberg	1	0	0	0	0	1
3	Anthony Breslin	1	0	0	0	0	1
22	Conor Keeley	1	0	0	0	0	1
19	Alex Nolan	0	0	0	1	0	1
35	Anthony Dodd	0	0	0	1	0	1

==== Top clean sheets ====
Includes all competitive matches. Last updated 2 November 2024

Number	Name	SSE Airtricity League	FAI Cup	UEFA Conference League	Leinster Senior Cup	President of Ireland's Cup	Total
1	Danny Rogers	7/20	0/0	0/0	0/4	0/0	7/24
13	Marcelo Pitaluga	1/4	0/0	0/0	1/2	0/1	2/7
29	Matt Boylan	0/0	0/0	0/0	0/0	0/0	0/0
40	Adam Banim	0/0	0/0	0/0	0/0	0/0	0/0
43	Shaun Hall	0/0	0/0	0/0	0/0	0/0	0/0
48	Darragh Mooney	0/0	0/0	0/0	0/0	0/0	0/0
94	Joseph Anang	4/12	0/1	3/6	0/0	0/0	7/19

==== Disciplinary record ====
Last updated 2 November 2024

Number	Name	SSE Airtricity League		FAI Cup		UEFA Conference League		Leinster Senior Cup		President of Ireland's Cup		Total	
Number	Name	Yellow card	Red card	Yellow card	Red card	Yellow card	Red card	Yellow card	Red card	Yellow card	Red card	Yellow card	Red card
6	Jamie Lennon	12	0	0	0	0	0	0	0	1	0	13	0
22	Conor Keeley	6	0	0	0	0	0	2	0	1	0	9	0
23	Ryan McLaughlin	6	0	0	0	1	0	2	0	0	0	8	0
16	Aaron Bolger	3	0	0	0	1	1	1	0	0	0	5	1
8	Chris Forrester	6	0	0	0	0	0	0	0	0	0	6	0
4	Joe Redmond	6	0	0	0	0	0	0	0	0	0	6	0
5	Tom Grivosti	4	0	0	0	1	0	0	0	0	0	5	0
3	Anthony Breslin	5	0	0	0	0	0	0	0	0	0	5	0
17	Romal Palmer	3	0	0	0	1	0	0	0	0	0	4	0
21	Axel Sjöberg	3	0	0	0	1	0	0	0	0	0	4	0
24	Luke Turner	4	0	0	0	0	0	0	0	0	0	4	0
9	Mason Melia	3	0	0	0	0	0	0	0	0	0	3	0
19	Alex Nolan	3	0	0	0	0	0	0	0	0	0	3	0
10	Kian Leavy	2	0	0	0	0	0	0	0	0	0	2	0
14	Brandon Kavanagh	2	0	0	0	0	0	0	0	0	0	2	0
20	Jake Mulraney	2	0	0	0	0	0	0	0	0	0	2	0
7	Ruairí Keating	2	0	0	0	0	0	0	0	0	0	2	0
13	Marcelo Pitaluga	2	0	0	0	0	0	0	0	0	0	2	0
28	Rhys Bartley	0	0	0	0	0	0	1	0	0	0	1	0
30	Al-Amin Kazeem	1	0	0	0	0	0	0	0	0	0	1	0
94	Danny Rogers	0	0	0	0	1	0	0	0	0	0	1	0
1	Danny Rogers	1	0	0	0	0	0	0	0	0	0	1	0
12	Cian Kavanagh	1	0	0	0	0	0	0	0	0	0	1	0
15	Arran Pettifer	0	0	0	0	0	0	0	1	0	0	0	1
–	Matthew O'Hara	0	0	0	0	0	0	1	0	0	0	1	0
2	Kieran Freeman	0	0	0	0	0	0	1	0	0	0	1	0
–	Eric Abudiore	0	0	0	0	0	0	1	0	0	0	1	0
–	Adam Deans	0	0	0	0	0	0	1	0	0	0	1	0
Totals		77	0	0	0	6	1	9	1	2	0	94	2

==== Captains ====
No.	P	Name	Country	No. games	Notes
4	DF	Joe Redmond	(Republic of Ireland)	40	Captain
8	DF	Chris Forrester	(Republic of Ireland)	4	Vice-captain
11	DF	Ryan McLaughlin	(Republic of Ireland)	3	
5	DF	Tom Grivosti	(England)	1	
11	DF	Jason McClelland	(Republic of Ireland)	1	

Last updated: 2 November 2024
Source: Competitive match reports.
Competitive matches only
Matches started as captain only
Country: FIFA nationality; No.: Squad number; P: Position; Name: Player name; No. Games: Number of games started as captain.

== Club ==
=== Coaching staff ===
- First-team Manager: Jon Daly (until 7 May)
  Stephen Kenny (from 16 May)
- Assistant Coach: Graham Kelly (until 29 May)
  Brian Gartland (from 10 June)
- Assistant Coach: Seán O'Connor
- Director of Football: Ger O'Brien
- Technical Director: Alan Mathews
- Head of Analysis: Graham Kelly
- Goalkeeping coach: Pat Jennings
- Athletic Therapist: David Mugalu
- Head of Performance: Paul McGrath (until 16 May)
  Graham Byrne (from 16 May)
- Head of Medical: Sam Rice
- Club Doctor: Eoin Godkin
- Masseuse: Christy O'Neill
- Equipment Manager: David McGill
- Head of Academy Football: Stephen Elliott
- Assistant Academy Director: Jamie Moore
- Head of Academy Medical: David Mugalu
- Head of Academy Recruitment: Ian Cully
- Head of Academy Data: Phil Power
- Under 20s Manager: Stephen Elliott
- Under 20s Coach: Paul Webb
- Under 17s Manager: John Donohue
- Under 15s Manager: Alan Brady
- Under 15s Assistant Manager: Willie Tyrell
- Under 15s Coach: Ciarán Creagh
- Under 15s Goalkeeping Coach: Jamie Quinn
- Under 14s Manager: Mark Connolly
- Under 14s Assistant Manager: Terry Carroll
- Under 14s Coach: Dan Tannim
- Under 14s Goalkeeping Coach: Alex Regan

=== Kit ===
Supplier: Umbro
Sponsor(s): Manguard Plus (Front of Jersey)
McCarthy Insurance Group (Back of Jersey - Top)
Clune Construction Company (Back of Jersey - Bottom)
Bill Griffin Motors (Sleeves of Jersey)

Home	Away	Third

The club released new Home & Third kits for the season and repurposed the 2023 Third kit as the Away kit for 2024.

Type	Shirt	Shorts	Socks	Info
Home	Red/White Sleeves	White	Red/White	Worn 27 times; against Shamrock Rovers (PIC) (A), Bohemians (LOI) (H), Waterford (LOI) (A), Dundalk (LOI) (H), Sligo Rovers (LOI) (H), Sligo Rovers (LOI) (H), Shamrock Rovers (LOI) (H), Waterford (LOI) (H), Drogheda United (LOI) (H), Shamrock Rovers (LOI) (A), Derry City (LOI) (H), Shelbourne (LOI) (H), Galway United (LOI) (H), Dundalk (LOI) (H), Shamrock Rovers (LOI) (H), Bohemians (LOI) (H), Waterford (LOI) (A), Vaduz (UCL) (H), Sligo Rovers (LOI) (H), Sabah (UCL) (H), Sabah (UCL) (A), Istanbul Başakşehir (UCL) (H), Drogheda United (LOI) (H), Waterford (LOI) (H) Shamrock Rovers (LOI) (A), Galway United (LOI) (H), Derry City (LOI) (H)
Away	Yellow	Black	Yellow	Worn 27 times; against Athlone Town (FRN) (A), Cork City (FRN) (N), Usher Celtic (LSC) (A), Bohemians (FRN) (N), Drogheda United (FRN) (N), UCD (LSC) (A), St Mochta's (LSC) (A), St Mochta's (FRN) (N), Galway United (LOI) (A), Drogheda United (LOI) (A), Dundalk (LOI) (A), Derry City (LOI) (A), Shelbourne (LOI) (A), Bohemians (LOI) (A), Bray Wanderers (LSC) (A), Drogheda United (LOI) (A), Ballymena United (FRN) (H), Cliftonville (FRN) (H), Vaduz (LOI) (A), Galway United (LOI) (A), Dundalk (LOI) (A), Maynooth University Town (LSC) (H), Shelbourne (LOI) (A), St Mochta's (LSC) (H), Bohemians (LOI) (A), Sligo Rovers (LOI) (A)
Third	Green	Green	Green	Worn 4 times; against Derry City (LOI) (A), Minnesota United (FRN) (A), Sligo Rovers (LOI) (A), İstanbul Başakşehir (UCL) (A)

Key:
LOI=League of Ireland Premier Division
FAI=FAI Cup
UCL=UEFA Conference League
PIC=President of Ireland's Cup
LSC=Leinster Senior Cup
FRN=Friendly

== Competitions ==
=== League of Ireland ===
==== League table ====
Pos	Team	Pld	W	D	L	GF	GA	GD	Pts	Qualification or relegation
1	Shelbourne (C)	36	17	12	7	40	27	+13	63	Qualification for Champions League first qualifying round
2	Shamrock Rovers	36	17	10	9	50	35	+15	61	Qualification for Conference League second qualifying round (Note: Drogheda United were expelled from the Conference League second qualifying round which they qualified as the 2024 FAI Cup winners, as their owners Trivela Group also own Danish club Silkeborg, who finished seventh in Danish Superliga. Due to the multi-club ownership rule, only Silkeborg could be admitted to the Conference League as they have a higher league position. As no team from Republic of Ireland could replace them because of UEFA licensing issues, the second-placed Shamrock Rovers were moved from the first qualifying round to the second qualifying round along with Dinamo City of Albania, the next highest association cup winners.)
3	St Patrick's Athletic	36	17	8	11	51	37	+14	59	Qualification for Conference League first qualifying round
4	Derry City	36	14	13	9	48	31	+17	55	
5	Galway United	36	13	13	10	33	29	+4	52	
6	Sligo Rovers	36	13	10	13	40	51	−11	49	
7	Waterford	36	13	6	17	43	47	−4	45	
8	Bohemians	36	10	12	14	39	43	−4	42	
9	Drogheda United (O)	36	7	13	16	41	58	−17	34	Qualification for promotion/relegation play-off
10	Dundalk (R)	36	5	11	20	23	50	−27	26	Relegation to League of Ireland First Division

Source: SSE Airtricity League, Soccerway
Rules for classification: 1) Points; 2) Goal difference; 3) Goals scored.
(C) Champions; (O) Play-off winners; (R) Relegated

==== Results summary ====
Overall								Home						Away					
Pld	W	D	L	GF	GA	GD	Pts	W	D	L	GF	GA	GD	W	D	L	GF	GA	GD
36	17	8	11	51	37	+14	59	11	2	5	29	17	+12	6	6	6	22	20	+2

Last updated: 2 November 2024.

==== Results by round ====
Round	1	2	3	4	5	6	7	8	9	10	11	12	13	14	15	16	17	18	19	20	21	22	23	24	25	26	27	28	29	30	31	32	33	34	35	36
Ground	A	H	A	A	H	H	A	H	H	A	H	A	A	H	A	A	H	H	A	H	H	A	H	H	A	H	A	H	A	H	A	A	A	H	H	A
Result	W	L	L	L	W	L	D	W	W	D	D	L	L	W	L	D	L	L	D	W	L	D	W	D	L	W	D	W	W	W	W	W	W	W	W	W
Position	2	6	6	8	5	8	8	5	3	4	5	6	6	5	7	7	7	7	7	7	8	8	6	6	7	7	7	7	7	7	6	5	4	4	3	3

Updated to match(es) played on 2 November 2024. Source: 2024 League of Ireland Premier Division
A = Away; H = Home; W = Win; D = Draw; L = Loss

==== Matches ====
Win Draw Loss

16 February 2024 1	Galway United	0–1	St Patrick's Athletic	Galway, County Galway
19:45 GMT	Conor McCormack (yellow card) 44'; Colm Horgan (yellow card) 52'; Stephen Walsh (red card) 79'	Report	Jamie Lennon 3'; Jake Mulraney (yellow card) 21'; Kian Leavy (yellow card) 33'; Joe Redmond (yellow card) 55'	Stadium: Eamonn Deacy Park; Attendance: 4,094; Referee: Eoghan O'Shea

23 February 2024 2	St Patrick's Athletic	0–1	Bohemians	Inchicore, Dublin 8
19:45 GMT	Ruairí Keating (yellow card) 16'; Marcelo Pitaluga (yellow card) 79'; Luke Turner (yellow card) 90+10'	Report	Cian Byrne (yellow card) 42'; James Clarke (yellow card) 63'; Jordan Flores 80' (pen.); Filip Piszczek (yellow card) 90+11'	Stadium: Richmond Park; Attendance: 5,013; Referee: Rob Hennessey

1 March 2024 3	Derry City	2–1	St Patrick's Athletic	Derry, Northern Ireland
19:45 GMT	Patrick Hoban (yellow card) 31'; Patrick Hoban 65'; Danny Mullen 90+2'	Report	Ruairí Keating 48'; Anthony Breslin (yellow card) 66'; Marcelo Pitaluga (yellow card) 80'; Cian Kavanagh (yellow card) 85'	Stadium: Ryan McBride Brandywell Stadium; Attendance: 3,014; Referee: Rob Harvey
Note: Live on RTÉ Two

4 March 2024 4	Waterford	3–1	St Patrick's Athletic	Waterford, County Waterford
19:45 GMT	Pádraig Amond 7'; Pádraig Amond 41'; Pádraig Amond (yellow card) 56'; Maleace Asamoah 70'; Rowan McDonald (yellow card) 77'; Darragh Power (yellow card) 81'	Report	Anthony Breslin 34'; Jamie Lennon (yellow card) 56'	Stadium: RSC; Attendance: 3,076; Referee: Kevin O'Sullivan

8 March 2024 5	St Patrick's Athletic	1–0	Dundalk	Inchicore, Dublin 8
19:45 GMT	Ruairí Keating 30'; Alex Nolan (yellow card) 90+2'; Jamie Lennon (yellow card) 90+4'	Report	Robbie Benson (yellow card) 48'; Koen Oostenbrink (yellow card) 68'; Robbie Mahon (yellow card) 90+1'	Stadium: Richmond Park; Attendance: 4,511; Referee: Ray Matthews

15 March 2024 6	St Patrick's Athletic	1–2	Shelbourne	Inchicore, Dublin 8
19:45 GMT	Brandon Kavanagh (yellow card) 35'; Anthony Breslin (yellow card) 65'; Jake Mulraney 71'; Axel Sjöberg (yellow card) 80'	Report	Mark Coyle (yellow card) 29'; Will Jarvis 49'; Liam Burt (yellow card) 51'; Will Jarvis 58'; Tyreke Wilson (yellow card) 59'; John O'Sullivan (yellow card) 90+3'; Jonathan Lunney (yellow card) 90+5'; Shane Farrell (yellow card) 90+7'	Stadium: Richmond Park; Attendance: 4,988; Referee: Rob Harvey

29 March 2024 7	Drogheda United	0–0	St Patrick's Athletic	Drogheda, County Louth
19:45 GMT	Evan Weir (yellow card) 59'; Darragh Markey (yellow card) 63'	Report	Luke Turner (yellow card) 15'	Stadium: Weavers Park; Attendance: 2,236; Referee: Kevin O'Sullivan

1 April 2024 8	St Patrick's Athletic	3–0	Sligo Rovers	Inchicore, Dublin 8
17:00 GMT	Luke Turner 10'; Luke Turner 42'; Conor Keeley (yellow card) 55'; Mason Melia 86'; Aaron Bolger (yellow card) 88'	Report	Ellis Chapman (yellow card) 86'	Stadium: Richmond Park; Attendance: 3,825; Referee: Paul Norton

5 April 2024 9	St Patrick's Athletic	2–1	Shamrock Rovers	Inchicore, Dublin 8
19:45 GMT	Joe Redmond 54'; Alex Nolan 57'; Jamie Lennon (yellow card) 64'	Report	Darragh Nugent 4'; Dylan Watts (yellow card) 48'; Markus Poom (yellow card) 49'; Aaron Greene (yellow card) 65'; Daniel Cleary (yellow card) 88'	Stadium: Richmond Park; Attendance: 5,015; Referee: Damien MacGraith

12 April 2024 10	Dundalk	0–0	St Patrick's Athletic	Dundalk, County Louth
19:50 GMT	Zak Bradshaw (yellow card) 63'; Robbie Benson (yellow card) 90+5'	Report	Alex Nolan (yellow card) 62'	Stadium: Oriel Park; Attendance: 2,325; Referee: Gavin Colfer
Note: Kickoff delayed 5 minutes to 19:50 as part of a planned protest by all League of Ireland match officials.

19 April 2024 11	St Patrick's Athletic	1–1	Waterford	Inchicore, Dublin 8
19:45 GMT	Mason Melia (yellow card) 36'; Aaron Bolger (yellow card) 37'; Brandon Kavanagh 65'; Chris Forrester (yellow card) 90+4'	Report	Maleace Asamoah 13'; Robbie McCourt (yellow card) 29'; Maleace Asamoah (yellow card) 37'; Ben McCormack (yellow card) 73'	Stadium: Richmond Park; Attendance: 4,376; Referee: David Dunne

22 April 2024 12	Derry City	3–1	St Patrick's Athletic	Derry, Northern Ireland
19:45 GMT	Patrick Hoban (yellow card) 13'; Danny Mullen 16'; Cameron McJannett (yellow card) 20'; Patrick Hoban 52'; Danny Mullen 57'; Adam O'Reilly (yellow card) 72'	Report	Jamie Lennon (yellow card) 38'; Conor Keeley 54'; Ryan McLaughlin (yellow card) 74'; Conor Keeley (yellow card) 82'	Stadium: Ryan McBride Brandywell Stadium; Attendance: 2,691; Referee: Kevin O'Sullivan
Note: Fixture brought forward due to both teams' involvement in the UEFA Conference League.

26 April 2024 13	Shelbourne	1–0	St Patrick's Athletic	Drumcondra, Dublin 3
19:45 GMT	John Martin 33'	Report	Jamie Lennon (yellow card) 16'; Ryan McLaughlin (yellow card) 48'; Aaron Bolger (yellow card) 72'; Conor Keeley (yellow card) 82'; Alex Nolan (yellow card) 85'	Stadium: Tolka Park; Attendance: 4,755; Referee: Robert Harvey

3 May 2024 14	St Patrick's Athletic	1–0	Drogheda United	Inchicore, Dublin 8
19:45 GMT	Conor Keeley (yellow card) 16'; Ruairí Keating 45+1'; Danny Rogers (yellow card) 90+5'	Report	Frantz Pierrot (yellow card) 22'; Ryan Brennan (yellow card) 49'	Stadium: Richmond Park; Attendance: 3,765; Referee: Declan Toland

6 May 2024 15	Sligo Rovers	1–0	St Patrick's Athletic	Sligo, County Sligo
17:00 GMT	Ellis Chapman 22'; Niall Morahan (yellow card) 44'; Conor Reynolds (yellow card) 56'; Rein Smit (yellow card) 71'; Stefan Radosavljevic (yellow card) 81'; Kailin Barlow (yellow card) 90'; Reece Hutchinson (yellow card) 90+3'	Report	Chris Forrester (yellow card) 21'; Luke Turner (yellow card) 90'	Stadium: The Showgrounds; Attendance: 2,548; Referee: David Dunne

10 May 2024 16	Shamrock Rovers	2–2	St Patrick's Athletic	Tallaght, Dublin 24
19:45 GMT	Aaron Greene 4'; Roberto Lopes (yellow card) 41'; Daniel Cleary 60'; Markus Poom (yellow card) 87'	Report	Luke Turner 23'; Ruairí Keating (yellow card) 45+1'; Anthony Breslin (yellow card) 51'; Mason Melia 64'; Joe Redmond (yellow card) 74'; Chris Forrester (yellow card) 87'	Stadium: Tallaght Stadium; Attendance: 7,073; Referee: Paul McLaughlin
Note: Live on RTÉ Two.

17 May 2024 17	St Patrick's Athletic	0–1	Derry City	Inchicore, Dublin 8
19:45 GMT	Joe Redmond (yellow card) 82'	Report	Patrick Hoban (yellow card) 22'; Paul McMullan 76'; Ciarán Coll (yellow card) 88'	Stadium: Richmond Park; Attendance: 4,621; Referee: Mark Houlihan

20 May 2024 18	St Patrick's Athletic	1–2	Shelbourne	Inchicore, Dublin 8
19:45 GMT	Jamie Lennon (yellow card) 19'; Ryan McLaughlin (yellow card) 70'; Jake Mulraney 73'; Conor Keeley (yellow card) 80'	Report	Seán Boyd 14'; John O'Sullivan (yellow card) 45+2'; Mark Coyle (yellow card) 72'; Paddy Barrett (yellow card) 81'; Evan Caffrey 90+6'; Evan Caffrey (yellow card) 90+7'	Stadium: Richmond Park; Attendance: 4,811; Referee: Robert Hennessey
Note: Fixture brought forward due to both teams' involvement in the UEFA Conference League. Live on Virgin Media.

24 May 2024 19	Bohemians	2–2	St Patrick's Athletic	Phibsborough, Dublin 7
19:45 GMT	Dylan Connolly (yellow card) 17'; James Akintunde 40'; Aboubacar Keita (yellow card) 42'; Paddy Kirk (yellow card) 45+9'; James McManus (yellow card) 52'; Jordan Flores (yellow card) 69'; Danny Grant 90+2'	Report	Chris Forrester 28' (pen.); Chris Forrester (yellow card) 45+5'; Cian Kavanagh 45+6'; Luke Turner (yellow card) 45+7'; Ryan McLaughlin (yellow card) 64'	Stadium: Dalymount Park; Attendance: 4,431; Referee: Rob Harvey

31 May 2024 20	St Patrick's Athletic	2–1	Galway United	Inchicore, Dublin 8
19:45 GMT	Mason Melia 35'; Jake Mulraney (yellow card) 75'; Alex Nolan 88'		Francely Lomboto 69'	Stadium: Richmond Park; Attendance: 4,077; Referee: Gavin Colfer

3 June 2024 21	St Patrick's Athletic	2–3	Dundalk	Inchicore, Dublin 8
17:15 GMT	Joe Redmond (yellow card) 16'; Chris Forrester 27' (pen.); Jamie Lennon 35'; Mason Melia (yellow card) 58'	Report	Jamie Gullan 2'; Ryan O'Kane 4'; Paul Doyle (yellow card) 18'; Jamie Gullan 22'; Archie Davies (yellow card) 50'; Zak Johnson (yellow card) 62'; Daryl Horgan (yellow card) 90+4'	Stadium: Richmond Park; Attendance: 3,934; Referee: Rob Hennessy
Note: Live on Virgin Media.

7 June 2024 22	Drogheda United	0–0	St Patrick's Athletic	Drogheda, County Louth
19:45 GMT	Ryan Brennan (yellow card) 45+1'; Adam Foley (yellow card) 54'; Luke Heeney (yellow card) 55'	Report	Ryan McLaughlin (yellow card) 16'; Jamie Lennon (yellow card) 73'	Stadium: Weavers Park; Attendance: 2,046; Referee: Declan Toland

13 June 2024 23	St Patrick's Athletic	2–1	Shamrock Rovers	Inchicore, Dublin 8
19:45 GMT	Tom Grivosti (yellow card) 17'; Ruairí Keating 76'; Joe Redmond (yellow card) 88'; Brandon Kavanagh 90+6'	Report	Johnny Kenny 32'; Markus Poom (yellow card) 58'; Lee Steacy (yellow card) 71'; Jack Byrne (yellow card) 89'; Dylan Watts (yellow card) 90'	Stadium: Richmond Park; Attendance: 4,965; Referee: Damien MacGraith

28 June 2024 24	St Patrick's Athletic	0–0	Bohemians	Inchicore, Dublin 8
19:45 GMT	Axel Sjöberg (yellow card) 32'; Brandon Kavanagh (yellow card) 71'	Report	Cian Byrne (yellow card) 83'; Danny Grant (yellow card) 86'	Stadium: Richmond Park; Attendance: 5,015; Referee: Paul McLaughlin

4 July 2024 25	Waterford	1–0	St Patrick's Athletic	Waterford, County Waterford
19:45 GMT	Ben McCormack 52'; Kacper Radkowski (yellow card) 61'; Grant Horton (yellow card) 74'; Connor Parsons (yellow card) 84'	Report	Jamie Lennon (yellow card) 46'; Anthony Breslin (yellow card) 70'	Stadium: RSC; Attendance: 2,786; Referee: Rob Hennessey

4 August 2024 26	St Patrick's Athletic	3–2	Sligo Rovers	Inchicore, Dublin 8
18:00 GMT	Aidan Keena 25' (pen.); Brandon Kavanagh 65'; Jamie Lennon (yellow card) 89'; Brandon Kavanagh 90+10' (pen.)	Report	Connor Malley 22'; Nando Pijnaker (yellow card) 25'; Ellis Chapman 53'; Niall Morahan (yellow card) 68'; Ellis Chapman (yellow card) 90+8'; Kailin Barlow (yellow card) 90+9'	Stadium: Richmond Park; Attendance: 3,211; Referee: Rob Hennessey
Note: Moved from 2 August due to St Patrick's Athletic's involvement in the UEFA Conference League on 1 August.

11 August 2024 27	Galway United	1–1	St Patrick's Athletic	Galway, County Galway
15:00 GMT	Greg Cunningham (yellow card) 40'; Stephen Walsh (yellow card) 45+2'; Ed McCarthy 54'		Jason McClelland 37'; Jamie Lennon (yellow card) 45+2'; Al-Amin Kazeem (yellow card) 55'; Conor Keeley (yellow card) 85'	Stadium: Eamonn Deacy Park; Attendance: 2,813; Referee: Daniel Murphy
Note: Moved from 9 August due to St Patrick's Athletic's involvement in the UEFA Conference League on 8 August.

1 September 2024 28	St Patrick's Athletic	4–1	Drogheda United	Inchicore, Dublin 8
18:00 GMT	Chris Forrester 29' (pen.); Jake Mulraney 45'; Jake Mulraney 50'; Mason Melia 90+3'	Report	Luke Heeney (red card) 29'; Douglas James-Taylor 43' (pen.)	Stadium: Richmond Park; Attendance: 3,022; Referee: Rob Hennessey
Note: Moved from 30 August due to St Patrick's Athletic's involvement in the UEFA Conference League on 28 August.

5 September 2024 29	Dundalk	1–2	St Patrick's Athletic	Dundalk, County Louth
19:45 GMT	Eoin Kenny 2'; Dan Pike (yellow card) 47'	Report	Tom Grivosti 55'; Mason Melia 68'	Stadium: Oriel Park; Attendance: 2,267; Referee: Damien MacGraith
Note: Moved from 23 August due to St Patrick's Athletic's involvement in the UEFA Conference League on 22 August.

20 September 2024 30	St Patrick's Athletic	3–0	Waterford	Inchicore, Dublin 8
19:45 GMT	Tom Grivosti (yellow card) 29'; Zack Elbouzedi 35'; Mason Melia 39'; Mason Melia (yellow card) 44'; Chris Forrester (yellow card) 75'; Aidan Keena 77'	Report	Dean McMenamy (yellow card) 32'	Stadium: Richmond Park; Attendance: 4,237; Referee: Neil Doyle

27 September 2024 31	Shamrock Rovers	0–3	St Patrick's Athletic	Tallaght, Dublin 24
20:00 GMT	Graham Burke (yellow card) 55'	Report	Joe Redmond 1'; Jake Mulraney 13'; Tom Grivosti (yellow card) 51'; Jake Mulraney 59'	Stadium: Tallaght Stadium; Attendance: 6,839; Referee: Rob Harvey

30 September 2024 32	Shelbourne	2–3	St Patrick's Athletic	Drumcondra, Dublin 3
19:15 GMT	Paddy Barrett (yellow card) 14'; Sean Gannon (yellow card) 70'; Rayhaan Tulloch 76'; Matty Smith 81'; Kameron Ledwidge (yellow card) 90+1'; Matty Smith (red card) 90+2'; John Martin (yellow card) 90+5'	Report	Anthony Breslin (yellow card) 10'; Joe Redmond 22'; Brandon Kavanagh 62'; Jamie Lennon (yellow card) 79'; Al-Amin Kazeem 88'; Joe Redmond (yellow card) 90+5'	Stadium: Tolka Park; Attendance: 4,382; Referee: Damien MacGraith
Note: Moved from 13 September due to Shelbourne's involvement in the FAI Cup on 14 September. Live on RTÉ Two.

14 October 2024 33	Bohemians	1–3	St Patrick's Athletic	Phibsborough, Dublin 7
19:45 GMT	James Clarke (yellow card) 13'; Dawson Devoy (penalty missed) 17'; Ross Tierney (yellow card) 44'; Ross Tierney (yellow card) 49' (yellow-red card); Dawson Devoy 89'; Filip Piszczek (yellow card) 90+3'		Tom Grivosti (yellow card) 31'; Chris Forrester 60'; Jake Mulraney 76'; Joe Redmond 81'	Stadium: Dalymount Park; Attendance: 3,761; Referee: Rob Hennessey
Note: Moved from 4 October due to Bohemians' involvement in the FAI Cup on 6 October.

18 October 2024 34	St Patrick's Athletic	2–1	Galway United	Inchicore, Dublin 8
19:45 GMT	Aidan Keena 32'; Ryan McLaughlin (yellow card) 45+2'; Chris Forrester (yellow card) 45+4'; Aidan Keena 68'; Romal Palmer (yellow card) 90+2'; Tom Grivosti (yellow card) 90+8'	Report	Francely Lomboto (yellow card) 45+3'; Ed McCarthy 50'; Garry Buckley (yellow card) 90+8'	Stadium: Richmond Park; Attendance: 4,851; Referee: Neil Doyle

25 October 2024 35	St Patrick's Athletic	1–0	Derry City	Inchicore, Dublin 8
19:45 GMT	Jamie Lennon (yellow card) 36'; Brandon Kavanagh 44'; Kian Leavy (yellow card) 69'; Romal Palmer (yellow card) 84'	Report	Duncan Idehen (yellow card) 23'; Ronan Boyce (yellow card) 25'; Sadou Diallo (yellow card) 35'; Shane McEleney (yellow card) 53'; Jacob Davenport (yellow card) 88'	Stadium: Richmond Park; Attendance: 4,998

1 November 2024 36	Sligo Rovers	0–2	St Patrick's Athletic	Sligo, County Sligo
19:45 GMT	Niall Morahan (yellow card) 18'; Connor Malley (yellow card) 53'; Oliver Denham (yellow card) 54'; Owen Elding (yellow card) 53'	Report	Aidan Keena 38'; Romal Palmer (yellow card) 85'; Romal Palmer 90'	Stadium: The Showgrounds; Attendance: 3,620; Referee: Rob Harvey

=== FAI Cup ===
Win Draw Loss

==== Second Round ====
21 July 2024 Second Round	Derry City	3–0	St Patrick's Athletic	Derry, Northern Ireland
18:00	Ciaran Coll (yellow card) 6'; Will Patching (penalty missed) 48'; Tom Grivosti 52' (o.g.); Danny Mullen 58'; Michael Duffy 67'	Report		Stadium: Ryan McBride Brandywell Stadium; Attendance: 2,190; Referee: Rob Harvey

=== UEFA Conference League ===
Win Draw Loss

==== Second Qualifying Round ====
25 July 2024 1st leg	St Patrick's Athletic (Republic of Ireland)	3–1	(Liechtenstein) Vaduz	Dublin, Republic of Ireland
19:45	Jake Mulraney 6'; Jake Mulraney 17'; Joe Redmond 77'	Report	Lorik Emini (yellow card) 16'; Mischa Beeli (yellow card) 29'; Alessandro Kräuchi (yellow card) 55'; Danilo Del Toro 65'; Liridon Berisha (yellow card) 90'	Stadium: Richmond Park; Attendance: 2,358; Referee: Tom Owen (Wales)
Note: Capacity of Richmond Park reduced due to UEFA regulations on standing areas not being used during UEFA Conference League matches.

1 August 2024 2nd leg	Vaduz (Liechtenstein)	2–2 (3–5 agg.)	(Republic of Ireland) St Patrick's Athletic	Vaduz, Liechtenstein
19:30	Fabrizio Cavegn 22' (pen.); Denis Simani (yellow card) 36'; Fabrizio Cavegn 76'; Fabrizio Cavegn (yellow card) 77'; Sandro Wieser (yellow card) 90+1'	Report	Zack Elbouzedi 28'; Joseph Anang (yellow card) 70'; Aaron Bolger (yellow card) 71'; Ryan McLaughlin (yellow card) 81'; Romal Palmer 81'; Jason McClelland (yellow card) 90+1'	Stadium: Rheinpark Stadion; Attendance: 1,405; Referee: Ashot Ghaltakhchyan (Armenia)

==== Third Qualifying Round ====
8 August 2024 1st leg	St Patrick's Athletic (Republic of Ireland)	1–0	(Azerbaijan) Sabah	Dublin, Republic of Ireland
19:45	Romal Palmer 35'; Romal Palmer (yellow card) 78'	Report	Ivan Lepinjica (yellow card) 28'; Jon Irazabal (yellow card) 31'; Ivan Lepinjica (yellow card) 53' (yellow-red card); Rahman Dashdamirov (yellow card) 74'	Stadium: Tallaght Stadium; Attendance: 4,352; Referee: Vilhjálmur Thórarinsson (Iceland)
Note: Moved from St Patrick's Athletic's Richmond Park home ground due to UEFA regulations.

15 August 2024 2nd leg	Sabah (Azerbaijan)	0–1 (0–2 agg.)	(Republic of Ireland) St Patrick's Athletic	Masazır, Azerbaijan
20:00	Sofian Chakla (red card) 27'	Report	Zack Elbouzedi 48'	Stadium: Bank Respublika Arena; Attendance: 6,132; Referee: Marcel Birsan (Romania)

==== Play-off Round ====
22 August 2024 1st leg	St Patrick's Athletic (Republic of Ireland)	0–0	(Turkey) İstanbul Başakşehir	Dublin, Republic of Ireland
19:45	Tom Grivosti (yellow card) 49'	Report	Hamza Güreler (yellow card) 87'	Stadium: Tallaght Stadium; Attendance: 6,064; Referee: Mohammed Al-Emara (Finland)
Note: Moved from St Patrick's Athletic's Richmond Park home ground due to UEFA regulations.

28 August 2024 2nd leg	İstanbul Başakşehir (Turkey)	2–0 (2–0 agg.)	(Republic of Ireland) St Patrick's Athletic	Istanbul, Turkey
19:00	Davidson (yellow card) 36'; Onur Ergün (yellow card) 55'; Ömer Ali Şahiner 64'; Olivier Kemen 82'	Report	Aaron Bolger (red card) 81'; Axel Sjöberg (yellow card) 90'	Stadium: Başakşehir Fatih Terim Stadium; Attendance: 6,223; Referee: Balázs Berke (Hungary)

=== Leinster Senior Cup ===
Win Draw Loss

==== Fourth Round - Group D ====
Team	Pld	W	D	L	GF	GA	GD	Pts
St Mochta's	3	2	1	0	8	2	+6	7
St Patrick's Athletic	3	1	2	0	8	6	+2	5
UCD	3	1	0	2	2	6	–4	3
Usher Celtic	3	0	1	2	1	6	+1	1

22 January 2024 Match 1	Usher Celtic	3–3	St Patrick's Athletic	Grangegorman, Dublin 7
19:30 GMT	Leroy Staunton (yellow card) 39'; Jimmy McHugh 44'; Gary Gannon 65' (pen.); Calvin Douglas (yellow card) 69'; Gary Gannon 75' (pen.); Jordan Buckley (yellow card) 89'	Report	Chris Forrester (penalty missed) 41'; Chris Forrester 41'; Cian Kavanagh 46' (pen.); Mason Melia 63'; Adam Deans (yellow card) 90+2'	Stadium: TUD Grangegorman; Attendance: 300 (Est.); Referee: Alan Patchell

3 February 2024 Match 2	UCD	1–3	St Patrick's Athletic	Belfield, Dublin 4
11:00 GMT	Adam Verdon (yellow card) 65'; Harvey O'Brien (yellow card) 68'; Danny Norris 75'	Report	Ruairí Keating 50'; Ruairí Keating 55'; Brandon Kavanagh 89'	Stadium: UCD Bowl; Attendance: 250 (Est.); Referee: Rob Hennessy

3 February 2024 Match 3	St Mochta's	2–2	St Patrick's Athletic	Clonsilla, Dublin 15
15:00 GMT	Liam Brady 30'; Gareth McCaffrey 42' (pen.); Gareth McCaffrey (yellow card) 75'; Alex Kelly (yellow card) 83'; Glenn Shannon (yellow card) 90+1'	Report	Cian Kavanagh 7'; Cian Kavanagh 24' (pen.); Arran Pettifer (red card) 41'; Conor Keeley (yellow card) 73'; Eric Abudiore (yellow card) 90+3'	Stadium: Porterstown Road; Attendance: 350 (Est.); Referee: Paul Norton

==== Quarter Final ====
27 May 2024 Quarter Final	Bray Wanderers	0–3	St Patrick's Athletic	Bray, County Wicklow
19:45 GMT	Destiny Avenbuan (yellow card) 54'; Joshua Kerr (yellow card) 78'; Zayd Abada (yellow card) 90+3'	Report	Aaron Bolger (yellow card) 22'; Kieran Freeman (yellow card) 27'; Alfie Taylor 28'; Dan McHale 72'; Matthew O'Hara (yellow card) 76'; Jason Folarin Oyenuga 83'	Stadium: Carlisle Grounds; Attendance: 600 (Est.); Referee: Robert Dowling

==== Semi Final ====
17 September 2024 Semi Final	St Patrick's Athletic	3–1	Maynooth University Town	Inchicore, Dublin 8
19:45 GMT	Luke Turner 4'; Michael Noonan 37' (pen.); Ryan McLaughlin (yellow card) 50'; Michael Noonan 65'; Conor Keeley (yellow card) 67'	Report	Finn Dolan (yellow card) 10'; Jordan Mooney 26'	Stadium: Richmond Park; Attendance: 650 (Est.); Referee: Daniel Murphy

==== Final ====
8 October 2024 Final	St Patrick's Athletic	2–1	St Mochta's	Inchicore, Dublin 8
19:45 GMT	Michael Noonan 25'; Kian Leavy 63'; Rhys Bartley (yellow card) 75'	Report	Luke McWilliams (yellow card) 46'; Aaron Robinson (yellow card) 66'; Gareth McCaffrey 90+3'	Stadium: Richmond Park; Attendance: 1,500 (Est.); Referee: Alan Patchell

=== President of Ireland's Cup ===
Win Draw Loss

==== Final ====
9 February 2024	Shamrock Rovers	3–1	St Patrick's Athletic	Tallaght, Dublin 24
20:00	Darragh Nugent (yellow card) 11'; Josh Honohan (yellow card) 13'; Conan Noonan (yellow card) 44'; Trevor Clarke 54'; Josh Honohan 62'; Lee Grace (yellow card) 88'; Trevor Clarke 89'; Darragh Burns (yellow card) 90+1'	Report	Jamie Lennon (yellow card) 35'; Conor Keeley (yellow card) 61'; Jamie Lennon 90+3'	Stadium: Tallaght Stadium; Attendance: 8,054; Referee: Damien MacGraith

=== Friendlies ===
Win Draw Loss

==== Pre-season ====
13 January 2024	Athlone Town	0–1	St Patrick's Athletic	Athlone, County Westmeath
15:00 GMT			Tommy Lonergan 74'	Stadium: Athlone Town Stadium; Attendance: 448; Referee: Declan Toland

20 January 2024	St Patrick's Athletic	4–1	Cork City	Cherry Orchard, Dublin 10
14:00 GMT	Ruairí Keating 15'; Jamie Lennon 26'; Cian Coleman 70' (o.g.); Chris Forrester 90'		Cathal O'Sullivan 63'	Stadium: Elmdale; Attendance: 100 (Est.) (Behind Closed Doors); Referee: Paul Lang

26 January 2024	St Patrick's Athletic	1–1	Bohemians	Blanchardstown, Dublin 15
11:00 GMT	Ruairí Keating 69'		Adam McDonnell (yellow card) 44'; Nickson Okosun 76'	Stadium: FAI National Training Centre; Attendance: 50 (Est.) (Behind closed doors); Referee: Paul Norton

26 January 2024	St Patrick's Athletic	2–1	Drogheda United	Blanchardstown, Dublin 15
20:00 GMT	Tommy Lonergan; Tommy Lonergan		Killian Cailloce	Stadium: TUD Blanchardstown; Attendance: 60 (Est.) (Behind Closed Doors); Referee: Rob Hennessy

10 February 2024	St Patrick's Athletic	1–1	St Mochta's	Blanchardstown, Dublin 15
10:30 GMT	TBC		Dean Casey 36'	Stadium: TUD Blanchardstown; Attendance: (Behind Closed Doors); Referee: Daniel Murphy

==== Mid-season ====
20 March 2024	Minnesota United (United States)	1–0	(Republic of Ireland) St Patrick's Athletic	Saint Paul, Minnesota, United States
19:00 CST	Devin Padelford (yellow card) 31'; Kervin Arriaga 57'	Report		Stadium: Allianz Field; Attendance: 8,000 (Est.); Referee: Chris Ruska

13 July 2024	St Patrick's Athletic	1–0	Ballymena United	Dublin, Republic of Ireland
14:00 GMT	Brandon Kavanagh			Stadium: Richmond Park; Attendance: 0 (Behind Closed Doors)

14 July 2024	St Patrick's Athletic	3–1	Cliftonville	Dublin, Republic of Ireland
14:00 GMT	Mason Melia; Mason Melia; Mason Melia		Trialist	Stadium: Richmond Park; Attendance: 0 (Behind Closed Doors)
