= Michael Noonan (footballer) =

Irish footballer

Personal information
- Full name: Michael John Noonan
- Date of birth: 31 July 2008 (age 18)
- Place of birth: Rathangan, County Kildare, Ireland
- Height: 1.85 m (6 ft 1 in)
- Position: Striker

Team information
- Current team: Shamrock Rovers
- Number: 31

Youth career
- Monasterevin
- Crumlin United
- –2022: Ballyoulster United
- 2022–2024: St Patrick's Athletic

Senior career*
Years	Team	Apps	(Gls)
2024	St Patrick's Athletic	1	(0)
2025–	Shamrock Rovers	59	(13)

International career^{‡}
2022–2023	Republic of Ireland U15	13	(8)
2023–2024	Republic of Ireland U16	14	(12)
2024–2025	Republic of Ireland U17	18	(8)
2025–	Republic of Ireland U19	5	(1)
2025–	Republic of Ireland U21	9	(1)
- * Club domestic league appearances and goals as of 17:37, 9 November 2026 (UTC) ‡ National team caps and goals as of 14:40, 15 November 2026 (UTC)

Michael John Noonan (born 31 July 2008) is an Irish professional footballer who plays as a striker for League of Ireland Premier Division club Shamrock Rovers. He started his senior career at his previous club St Patrick's Athletic. On 1 January 2027, he will join Premier League club Nottingham Forest.

== Club career ==
=== Youth career ===
Raised in Ellistown, a townland near Rathangan, County Kildare, Noonan attended Ardscoil Rath Íongahain and began playing his schoolboy football with Monasterevin. He later played for Crumlin United, then Celbridge-based club Ballyoulster United, before signing for the academy of League of Ireland club St Patrick's Athletic in 2022. He initially played for the club's under-15 side, before progressing through the under-17, under-19 and under-20 sides over the following 3 seasons.

=== St Patrick's Athletic ===
On 3 February 2024, Noonan made his senior debut for St Patrick's Athletic, replacing Ruairí Keating from the bench in the 76th minute of a 3–1 win away to UCD in the Leinster Senior Cup. On 17 September 2024, he scored his first goals in senior football, scoring twice in a 3–1 win over Maynooth University Town in the Semi Final of the same competition. On 8 October 2024, he opened the scoring in the Final of the 2023–24 Leinster Senior Cup in an eventual 2–1 win over St Mochta's at Richmond Park. His performances in the Leinster Senior Cup led to manager Stephen Kenny giving him his league debut on 14 October 2024, replacing Aidan Keena in the 89th minute of a 3–1 win over Bohemians at Dalymount Park. Later that month he was linked with a move to Premier League champions Manchester City.

=== Shamrock Rovers ===
On 15 January 2025, he signed for fellow League of Ireland Premier Division club Shamrock Rovers, turning down St Patrick's Athletic's matching contract offer as they had Mason Melia and Aidan Keena ahead of him in the pecking order, as well as Noonan being raised as a Shamrock Rovers fan by his family. Noonan became the youngest ever scorer in UEFA Conference League history when he scored for Shamrock Rovers away at Norwegian side Molde in his debut for the club on 13 February 2025. He scored the first senior league goal of his career in his 11th senior league appearance on 21 April 2025, giving his side a two-goal lead in an eventual 3–2 loss at home to Bohemians in the Dublin derby at Tallaght Stadium. In January 2026, his club turned down two bids from Bundesliga club Hoffenheim of around €1 million, as the bids fell below Rovers' €2 million valuation of Noonan. A fee of €1.8 million was then agreed between the clubs before the move fell through as Noonan did not want to move to Germany, with his mother then lodging a complaint to the Football Association in London about an alleged arrangement between Shamrock Rovers and another party, resulting in the FA notifying the issue with the FAI and FIFA who began an investigation into the club and the player's agent regarding a third-party cut of the potential transfer fee. In June 2026, it was reported that he was in advanced talks with Eredivisie club Ajax for a transfer there, although the move never materialised after Noonan rejected both Ajax and Celtic after flying over to both clubs to hear their transfer pitch in person.

=== Nottingham Forest ===
In September 2026, it emerged in the media that Noonan had reached a pre-contract agreement with Premier League club Nottingham Forest to join the club on a free transfer in January, following the expiry of his Shamrock Rovers contract. The transfer was confirmed by Forest on 30 September 2026, with the move set to officially go through on 1 January 2027.

== International career ==
Noonan has previously represented the Republic of Ireland at various age levels. He scored 2 goals in 5 appearances for the Republic of Ireland U15 in 2022. He continued his form into 2023 for the side, helping them to win the Torneo della Nazioni in Italy, scoring throughout the tournament including the winning goal against the hosts in the final on 1 May 2023. On 15 May 2023, he scored on his second appearance for the Republic of Ireland U16 side, scoring the winner in the final of the UEFA Development Tournament in a 2–1 victory over hosts Slovakia U16. On 11 November 2023, he scored in the final of the Victory Shield for the U16s as they retained their title with a 3–0 victory over Northern Ireland. On 26 January 2024, he scored his first international hat-trick, in a 6–0 win over Greece U16 in İzmir, Turkey. On 5 September 2024, he made his debut for the Republic of Ireland U17 team in a 2–1 loss to Denmark U17 in Marbella, Spain. He received his first called up to the Republic of Ireland U19 squad in March 2025. On 28 August 2025, he received his first call up to the Republic of Ireland U21 squad. On 9 September 2025, he scored his first goal for the Republic of Ireland U21s, when he came off the bench at home to Andorra U21 to score the only goal of the game in the 66th minute. Despite being a member of the U21 squad, Noonan dropped back down to the U17's when he was named in the squad for the 2025 FIFA U-17 World Cup in Qatar in November 2025.

== Personal life ==
He is the son of former League of Ireland player and convicted criminal Andrew Noonan who in May 2025 was given a 13-and-a-half year prison sentence for possessing €2.77 million worth of heroin in 2020.

== Career statistics ==
As of match played on 30 October 2026

Appearances and goals by club, season and competition
Club	Season	League			National Cup		League Cup		Europe		Other		Total	
Club	Season	Division	Apps	Goals	Apps	Goals	Apps	Goals	Apps	Goals	Apps	Goals	Apps	Goals
St Patrick's Athletic	2024	LOI Premier Division	1	0	0	0	–		0 (Note: Appearance(s) in the UEFA Conference League)	0	4 (Note: Appearance(s) in the Leinster Senior Cup)	3	5	3
Shamrock Rovers	2025	LOI Premier Division	30	6	4	2	–		12 (Note: 2 appearances, 1 goal in the 2024–25 UEFA Conference League campaign; 10 appearances in the 2025–26 UEFA Conference League campaign)	1	0	0	46	9
Shamrock Rovers	2026	LOI Premier Division	29	7	2	1	–		5 (Note: 3 appearances in the UEFA Champions League; 2 appearances in the UEFA Conference League)	0	0 (Note: Appearance in the President of Ireland's Cup)	0	36	8
Shamrock Rovers	Total		59	13	6	3	–		17	1	0	0	82	17
Career total			60	13	6	3	0	0	17	1	4	3	87	20

== Honours ==
St Patrick's Athletic

- Leinster Senior Cup: 2023–24

Shamrock Rovers

- League of Ireland Premier Division: 2025
