= Marcelo Pitaluga =

Brazilian footballer (born 2002)

Personal information
- Full name: Marcelo de Araújo Pitaluga Filho
- Date of birth: 20 December 2002 (age 23)
- Place of birth: Niterói, Brazil
- Height: 1.93 m (6 ft 4 in)
- Position: Goalkeeper

Team information
- Current team: Fluminense
- Number: 27

Youth career
- 2009–2010: Vasco da Gama
- 2011–2020: Fluminense

Senior career*
Years	Team	Apps	(Gls)
2019–2020	Fluminense	0	(0)
2020–2025	Liverpool	0	(0)
2022–2023	→ Macclesfield (loan)	19	(0)
2024	→ St Patrick's Athletic (loan)	4	(0)
2024–2025	→ Livingston (loan)	0	(0)
2025–	Fluminense	0	(0)

International career^{‡}
- Brazil U15
- Brazil U16
- Brazil U17
Medal record
Representing Brazil
FIFA U-17 World Cup
Gold medal – first place	2019 Brazil
- * Club domestic league appearances and goals as of 22:07, 30 June 2024 (UTC) ‡ National team caps and goals as of 17:23, 24 June 2024 (UTC)

Marcelo de Araújo Pitaluga Filho (born 20 December 2002) is a Brazilian professional footballer who plays as a goalkeeper for Fluminense.

== Career ==
=== Fluminense ===
Pitaluga started his career with Brazilian side Fluminense. He was an unused substitute with the first team on four occasions during his time with the club.

=== Liverpool ===
In 2020, he signed for Premier League club Liverpool, for an undisclosed fee potentially reaching £2 million. After sporadically being involved in the first team squad as an unused substitute in Premier League and EFL Cup games, Pitaluga made his first appearance at first team level on 25 July 2023, in a 4–4 draw against German side Greuther Fürth in a pre-season friendly.

==== Loan to Macclesfield ====
In July 2022, Pitaluga was sent on loan to English eighth-tier club Macclesfield. He made 18 league appearances for the club before an ankle injury suffered in November saw him out of action until April 2023. He made a total of 26 appearances in all competitions for the club as they won the 2022–23 Northern Premier League Division One West.

==== Loan to St Patrick's Athletic ====
On 5 January 2024, Pitaluga signed a new contract with Liverpool and was loaned out to League of Ireland Premier Division side St Patrick's Athletic. His spell at the club proved difficult, with high profile errors in the 2024 President of Ireland's Cup as well as a league game away to Waterford seeing him dropped by manager Jon Daly in favour of Danny Rogers after playing the first four league games of the season. On 29 June 2024, newly appointed manager Stephen Kenny confirmed that Pitaluga's loan spell with the club had been cut short after making seven appearances in all competitions in the club's first 29 games of the season.

==== Loan to Livingston ====
On 30 August 2024, Pitaluga signed for Scottish Championship side Livingston on loan.

=== Return to Fluminense ===
On 6 January 2025, Liverpool announced that subject to international clearance, Pitaluga would return on a permanent move to Fluminense.

== International career ==
As well as his native Brazil, Pitaluga also holds a German passport, making him eligible to play for the Germany national team. He has played for the Brazil under-15, under-16 and under-17 teams. He was part of the squad for Brazil U17's 2019 FIFA U-17 World Cup win.

== Career statistics ==
As of match played 12 November 2024

Appearances and goals by club, season and competition
Club	Season	League			National Cup (Note: Includes Copa do Brasil, FA Cup, FAI Cup & Scottish Cup)		League Cup (Note: Includes EFL Cup & Scottish League Cup)		Continental		Other		Total	
Club	Season	Division	Apps	Goals	Apps	Goals	Apps	Goals	Apps	Goals	Apps	Goals	Apps	Goals
Fluminense	2019	Campeonato Brasileiro Série A	0	0	0	0	–		–		0 (Note: Appearances in the Campeonato Carioca)	0	0	0
Fluminense	2020	Campeonato Brasileiro Série A	0	0	0	0	–		–		0	0	0	0
Fluminense	Total		0	0	0	0	–		–		0	0	0	0
Liverpool U21	2021–22	—			—		—		—		2 (Note: Appearances in EFL Trophy)	0	2	0
Liverpool U21	2023–24	—			—		—		—		2	0	2	0
Liverpool U21	Total		–								4	0	4	0
Liverpool	2021–22	Premier League	0	0	0	0	0	0	0 (Note: Appearances in the UEFA Champions League)	0	–		0	0
Liverpool	2022–23	Premier League	0	0	0	0	0	0	0	0	0 (Note: Appearance in the FA Community Shield)	0	0	0
Liverpool	2023–24	Premier League	0	0	0	0	0	0	0 (Note: Appearances in the UEFA Europa League)	0	–		0	0
Liverpool	2024–25	Premier League	0	0	0	0	0	0	0	0	–		0	0
Liverpool	Total		0	0	0	0	0	0	0	0	0	0	0	0
Macclesfield (loan)	2022–23	NPL Division One West	19	0	4	0	–		–		3 (Note: Appearances in the FA Trophy)	0	26	0
St Patrick's Athletic (loan)	2024	LOI Premier Division	4	0	0	0	–		0 (Note: Appearances in the UEFA Conference League)	0	3 (Note: 1 appearance in the President of Ireland's Cup & 2 appearances in the Leinster Senior Cup)	0	7	0
Livingston (loan)	2024–25	Scottish Championship	0	0	0	0	0	0	–		2 (Note: Appearances in the Scottish Challenge Cup)	0	2	0
Fluminense	2025	Campeonato Brasileiro Série A	0	0	0	0	–		0 (Note: Appearances in the Copa Sudamericana)	0	0 (Note: Appearances in the Campeonato Carioca & FIFA Club World Cup)	0	0	0
Fluminense	2026	Campeonato Brasileiro Série A	0	0	0	0	–		0 (Note: Appearances in the Copa Libertadores)	0	0 (Note: Appearances in the Campeonato Carioca)	0	0	0
Fluminense	Total		0	0	0	0	–		0	0	0	0	0	0
Career total			23	0	4	0	0	0	0	0	12	0	39	0

== Honours ==
Macclesfield

- Northern Premier League Division One West: 2022–23

Brazil U17

- FIFA U-17 World Cup: 2019
