= Alex Nolan =

English footballer (born 2003)

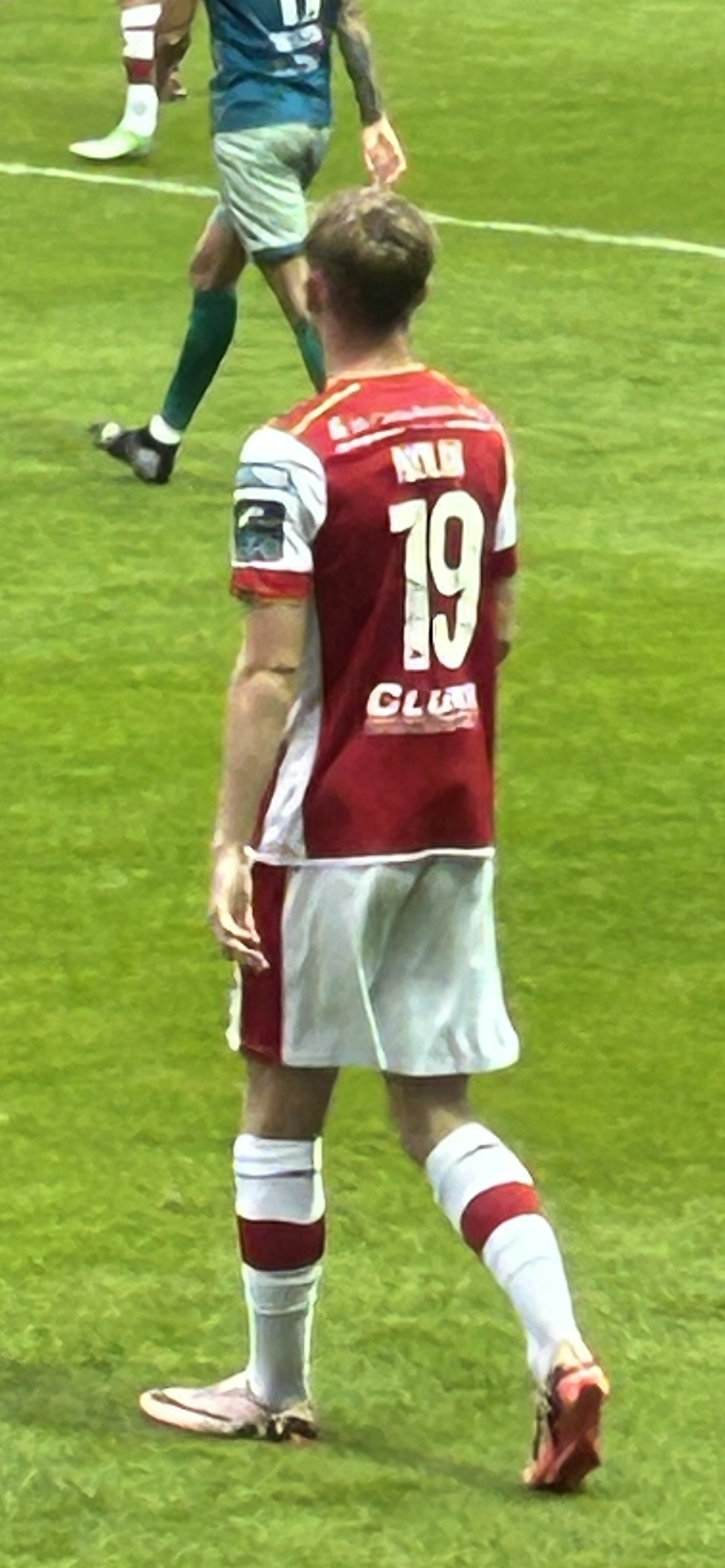
- Nolan in action for St Patrick's Athletic in 2024.

Personal information
- Full name: Alex Nolan
- Date of birth: 20 March 2003 (age 23)
- Place of birth: Dunboyne, Republic of Ireland
- Position: Winger

Team information
- Current team: Sligo Rovers
- Number: 19

Youth career
- –2018: Dunboyne
- 2018–2019: Shamrock Rovers
- 2020–2021: Shelbourne

Senior career*
Years	Team	Apps	(Gls)
2021	Shelbourne	4	(0)
2022–2023	UCD	48	(3)
2023–2024	St Patrick's Athletic	30	(2)
2025	Cork City	29	(4)
2026–	Sligo Rovers	22	(2)
- * Club domestic league appearances and goals as of 11:33, 10 November 2026 (GMT)

Alex Nolan (born 20 March 2003) is an Irish professional footballer who plays as a winger for League of Ireland Premier Division club Sligo Rovers. His previous clubs are Shelbourne, UCD, St Patrick's Athletic and Cork City.

== Career ==
=== Youth career ===
A native of Dunboyne, County Meath, Nolan began playing with local side Dunboyne A.F.C. before earning a move to the under 17 side of Shamrock Rovers in January 2018. At the end of the 2019 season he moved to Shelbourne, spending two seasons with the club, during which he featured for their under 17 and under 19 teams before making his first team debut.

=== Shelbourne ===
On 28 May 2021, Nolan made his career debut at senior level, coming off the bench in injury time of Shelbourne's 4–0 win over Galway United at Tolka Park. He featured 3 more times off the bench that season as the club won the 2021 League of Ireland First Division to gain promotion back to the League of Ireland Premier Division.

=== UCD ===
In January 2022, Nolan signed for fellow newly promoted side UCD. He made his competitive debut for the club on 4 February 2023 in a 4–1 loss to Shamrock Rovers in the Leinster Senior Cup. Nolan scored thirst goal of his senior career on 22 April 2022, a consolation goal off the bench in a heavy 7–1 defeat to Derry City at the Ryan McBride Brandywell Stadium. On 17 June 2022, he came off the bench in the 75th minute away to St Patrick's Athletic and 12 minutes later got on the end of Liam Kerrigan's pass to score his sides goal in a 2–1 loss. On 11 November 2022, Nolan's cross assisted Tommy Lonergan's header to secure a 1–0 win over Waterford in the 2022 League of Ireland Premier Division Promotion/Relegation Play-off to help his side secure their safety in the top division. On 24 February 2023, he scored his first goal of the season in a 3–2 defeat against Sligo Rovers at the UCD Bowl. He made the last of his 52 appearances for the club on 30 June 2023 in a 7–0 loss to St Patrick's Athletic at Richmond Park.

=== St Patrick's Athletic ===
On 6 July 2023, Nolan signed for fellow League of Ireland Premier Division club St Patrick's Athletic alongside Kian Leavy. On 23 July 2024, Nolan made his debut for the club, replacing Conor Carty from the bench in a 2–1 win away to Longford Town in the First Round of the 2023 FAI Cup. Nolan went on to feature in every round of the competition, culminating on 12 November 2023, when he replaced Kian Leavy in the 2023 FAI Cup Final as his side defeated rivals Bohemians 3–1 in front of a record FAI Cup Final attendance of 43,881 at the Aviva Stadium. On 5 April 2024, Nolan scored his first goal for the club, the winner in a 2–1 victory over Shamrock Rovers in the Dublin derby. On 31 May 2024, he replaced Cian Kavanagh from the bench to score an 88th-minute winner at home to Galway United to earn a 2–1 win for his side and their first league win under newly appointed manager Stephen Kenny. On 25 July 2024, Nolan made his first European appearance of his career, in a 3–1 win at home to Vaduz of Liechtenstein in the UEFA Conference League.

=== Cork City ===
On 25 November 2024, Nolan signed for newly promoted League of Ireland Premier Division side Cork City ahead of their 2025 season. He scored his first goal for the club on 3 March 2025, opening the scoring in a 2–1 defeat to Waterford at the RSC in what was his first league start for the club and his 100th career appearance. On 9 November 2025, he was part of the starting 11 in the 2025 FAI Cup final as his side were beaten 2–0 by Shamrock Rovers at the Aviva Stadium. He made a total of 34 appearances in all competitions, scoring 4 goals, as the club were relegated to the League of Ireland First Division by finishing bottom of the league.

=== Sligo Rovers ===
On 20 November 2025, League of Ireland Premier Division club announced that they had signed Nolan on a pre-contract for the 2026 season. On 7 March 2026, Nolan scored his first goal for the club with the winner in a 2–1 victory at home to Drogheda United, his side's first win of the season. Nolan scored 3 goals in 24 appearances in all competitions in 2026 as the club finished bottom of the league and were relegated to play in the League of Ireland First Division for the first time since 2006.

== Career statistics ==
As of match played on 4 September 2026

Appearances and goals by club, season and competition
Club	Season	League			National Cup		Europe		Other		Total	
Club	Season	Division	Apps	Goals	Apps	Goals	Apps	Goals	Apps	Goals	Apps	Goals
Shelbourne	2021	LOI First Division	4	0	0	0	—		—		4	0
UCD	2022	LOI Premier Division	26	2	2	0	—		1 (Note: Appearance in the 2022 League of Ireland Premier Division Promotion/Relegation Play-off)	0	29	2
UCD	2023	LOI Premier Division	22	1	—		—		1 (Note: Appearance(s) in the Leinster Senior Cup)	0	23	1
UCD	Total		48	3	2	0	—		2	0	52	3
St Patrick's Athletic	2023	LOI Premier Division	8	0	5	0	0 (Note: Appearance(s) in the UEFA Europa Conference League)	0	—		13	0
St Patrick's Athletic	2024	LOI Premier Division	22	2	0	0	1 (Note: Appearance(s) in the UEFA Conference League)	0	4 (Note: 1 appearance in the President of Ireland's Cup & 3 appearances in the Leinster Senior Cup)	0	27	2
St Patrick's Athletic	Total		30	2	5	0	1	0	4	0	40	2
Cork City	2025	LOI Premier Division	29	4	4	0	—		1 (Note: Appearance(s) in the Munster Senior Cup)	0	34	4
Sligo Rovers	2026	LOI Premier Division	22	2	3	1	—		—		25	3
Total			133	11	14	1	1	0	7	0	155	12

== Honours ==
Shelbourne

- League of Ireland First Division (1): 2021

St Patrick's Athletic

- FAI Cup (1): 2023
- Leinster Senior Cup (1): 2023–24
