= Cian Barrett =

Irish footballer (born 2005)

Personal information
- Full name: Cian Barrett
- Date of birth: 19 April 2005 (age 21)
- Place of birth: Dublin, Ireland
- Position: Midfielder

Team information
- Current team: Shamrock Rovers
- Number: 33

Youth career
- –2021: Shamrock Rovers
- 2021–2022: Shelbourne
- 2022–2023: Shamrock Rovers

Senior career*
Years	Team	Apps	(Gls)
2023–	Shamrock Rovers	12	(0)
2023	→ Kerry (loan)	24	(0)
2024	→ Kerry (loan)	10	(0)
2026	→ Waterford (loan)	11	(0)

International career
2019–2020	Republic of Ireland U15	9	(0)
- * Club domestic league appearances and goals as of 17:38, 9 November 2026 (UTC)

Cian Barrett (born 19 April 2005) is an Irish professional footballer who plays as a midfielder for League of Ireland Premier Division club Shamrock Rovers. He has previously spent time on loan at Kerry and Waterford.

== Club career ==
Barrett came through the Shamrock Rovers academy, featuring for the under‑15 side before a move to Shelbourne's under‑17 team under Damien Duff. He later rejoined Shamrock Rovers, signing to the senior squad in early 2023. He made his senior debut for the club in a 4–1 victory over UCD in that season's Leinster Senior Cup.

In March 2023, Barrett joined Kerry on loan, making over 25 appearances in their inaugural First Division season. He returned to Shamrock Rovers at the end of the 2023 campaign.

The following season, Barrett was introduced as a substitute in Shamrock Rovers' President's Cup victory. He made 5 league appearances, and was named on the bench in UEFA Champions League qualifiers against Víkingur and Sparta Prague.

Midway through the 2024 season Barrett grew frustrated at the lack of first-team opportunities, and on transfer deadline day in July, he re‑signed for Kerry on loan for the rest of the season. He wore the number 24 shirt and appeared in midfield and defence across ten league games. Barrett returned to Shamrock Rovers at the conclusion of the season.

Barrett became increasingly involved in the Shamrock Rovers first-team squad in 2025. On 31 July, he made his European debut, starting in a UEFA Conference League qualifier against St Joseph's. On 5 October 2025, he scored the first senior goal of his career, the final goal of the game in a 6–1 win over his former club Kerry in the FAI Cup Semi Final at Tallaght Stadium.

On 30 January 2026, Barrett signed for fellow League of Ireland Premier Division club Waterford on a season-long loan deal. On 30 June 2026, his loan spell was cut short after making 11 appearances for Waterford.

Upon returning to Rovers, he picked up an injury at home to Dundalk on 7 August 2026, which saw him undergo surgery that would keep him out of action for 5 or 6 months.

== International career ==
Barrett has represented the Republic of Ireland at youth level. He earned ten caps for the under‑15 team, playing both in defence and midfield.

== Style of play ==
Barrett is primarily a midfielder, comfortable playing centrally or on the right side of midfield, but he has also been deployed at centre‑back and right-back.

== Personal life ==
He is the son of former Republic of Ireland international, Graham Barrett, and grandson of Gary Barrett, both of whom played for Shamrock Rovers. He credits his father with having a positive influence on his professional career. Shamrock Rovers manager Stephen Bradley praised Barrett for “carrying on the tradition through his family”. Barrett attended Tallaght Community School and completed his Leaving Certificate there in 2023.

== Career statistics ==
As of match played on 7 August 2026

Appearances and goals by club, season and competition
Club	Season	League			National Cup (Note: Includes FAI Cup)		Europe		Other		Total	
Club	Season	Division	Apps	Goals	Apps	Goals	Apps	Goals	Apps	Goals	Apps	Goals
Shamrock Rovers	2023	LOI Premier Division	0	0	–		–		1 (Note: Appearance(s) in the Leinster Senior Cup)	0	1	0
Shamrock Rovers	2024	LOI Premier Division	5	0	0	0	0	0	1 (Note: Appearance in the President of Ireland's Cup)	0	6	0
Shamrock Rovers	2025	LOI Premier Division	6	0	2	1	3 (Note: Appearance(s) in the UEFA Conference League)	0	0	0	11	1
Shamrock Rovers	2026	LOI Premier Division	1	0	1	0	0	0	–		2	0
Shamrock Rovers	Total		12	0	3	1	3	0	2	0	20	1
Kerry (loan)	2023	LOI First Division	24	0	2	0	–		–		26	0
Kerry (loan)	2024	LOI First Division	10	0	1	0	–		–		11	0
Waterford (loan)	2026	LOI Premier Division	11	0	–		–		0 (Note: Appearance(s) in the Munster Senior Cup)	0	11	0
Total			57	0	6	1	3	0	2	0	68	1
