= Dylan Watts =

Republic of Ireland footballer

Personal information
- Full name: Dylan Billy Watts
- Date of birth: 11 April 1997 (age 29)
- Place of birth: Dublin, Republic of Ireland
- Height: 1.77 m (5 ft 10 in)
- Position: Midfielder

Team information
- Current team: Shamrock Rovers
- Number: 7

Senior career*
Years	Team	Apps	(Gls)
2015–2016	UCD	37	(4)
2016–2018	Leicester City	0	(0)
2018	→ Bohemians (loan)	20	(1)
2018–	Shamrock Rovers	230	(28)
- * Club domestic league appearances and goals as of 17:08, 9 November 2026 (UTC)

Dylan Watts (/ˈdɪlən wɒts/; born 11 April 1997) is a professional footballer who plays as a midfielder for Shamrock Rovers. He is a former Republic of Ireland youth international footballer and has played for UCD and Leicester City, and spent a loan spell at Bohemians.

== Early life ==
Watts went to Holly Park Boys’ School, Blackrock and played in a schools hurling final in Croke Park.

== Career ==
Watts played two seasons in the League of Ireland First Division for University College Dublin where he made 22 appearances in the 2015 season and 15 appearances in the 2016 season. He then moved to Leicester City where he made 10 appearances for their Under-23 team. However, he failed to make an appearance for Leicester's first team. He was loaned to Bohemians where he scored one goal in 20 appearances during the 2018 season. He left Bohemians part way through the 2018 season and joined Shamrock Rovers. He scored his first European goal in the 2022–23 UEFA Champions League first qualifying round win over Hibernians of Malta. Watts netted again in the 2022–23 UEFA Europa League win over KF Shkupi On 7 November 2024, Watts scored in a 2–1 victory over The New Saints in the UEFA Conference League. Watts was voted PFAI Player of the Year for the 2024 season by his fellow professionals in the league.

== International career ==
In November 2016, Watts received his first call-up to the Republic of Ireland U-21 squad for friendly matches against the Czech Republic and Slovakia. However, he did not make an appearance and therefore finished his under-21 career without a cap.

== Career statistics ==
As of match played 30 October 2026

Appearances and goals by club, season and competition
Club	Season	League			National cup		League cup		Europe		Other		Total	
Club	Season	Division	Apps	Goals	Apps	Goals	Apps	Goals	Apps	Goals	Apps	Goals	Apps	Goals
UCD	2015	LOI First Division	22	2	0	0	1	0	4 (Note: Appearances in the UEFA Europa League)	0	—		27	2
UCD	2016	LOI First Division	15	2	0	0	1	0	—		—		16	2
UCD	Total		37	4	0	0	2	0	4	0	0	0	43	4
Leicester City U23	2016–17	—			—		—		—		1 (Note: Appearances in the EFL Trophy)	0	1	0
Leicester City U23	2017–18	—			—		—		—		1	0	1	0
Leicester City U23	Total		—		—		—		—		2	0	2	0
Bohemians (loan)	2018	LOI Premier Division	20	1	—		2	2	—		—		22	3
Shamrock Rovers	2018	LOI Premier Division	11	4	0	0	—		2	0	—		13	4
Shamrock Rovers	2019	LOI Premier Division	32	3	1	0	1	0	4	0	—		39	3
Shamrock Rovers	2020	LOI Premier Division	18	3	4	0	—		2	0	1 (Note: Appearances in the President of Ireland's Cup)	0	25	3
Shamrock Rovers	2021	LOI Premier Division	29	2	1	1	—		6 (Note: 2 appearances in the UEFA Champions League; 4 appearances in the UEFA Europa Conference League)	0	1	0	37	3
Shamrock Rovers	2022	LOI Premier Division	31	2	2	0	—		13 (Note: 4 appearances, 1 goal in the UEFA Champions League; 4 appearances, 1 goal in the UEFA Europa League; 5 appearances in the UEFA Europa Conference League)	2	1	0	47	4
Shamrock Rovers	2023	LOI Premier Division	21	2	1	0	—		3 (Note: 2 appearances in the UEFA Champions League; 1 appearances in the UEFA Europa Conference League)	0	1	0	26	2
Shamrock Rovers	2024	LOI Premier Division	30	4	1	0	—		13 (Note: 4 appearances in the UEFA Champions League; 3 appearances, 1 goal in the UEFA Europa League; 6 appearances, 2 goals in the UEFA Conference League)	3	1	0	45	7
Shamrock Rovers	2025	LOI Premier Division	31	1	5	1	—		13 (Note: 1 appearance in the 2024–25 UEFA Conference League campaign; 12 appearances in the 2025–26 UEFA Conference League campaign)	0	0 (Note: Appearances in the Leinster Senior Cup)	0	49	2
Shamrock Rovers	2026	LOI Premier Division	27	7	1	0	—		8 (Note: 4 appearances, 1 goal in the UEFA Champions League; 2 appearances in the UEFA Europa League; 2 appearances in the UEFA Conference League)	1	1	0	37	8
Shamrock Rovers	Total		230	28	16	2	1	0	64	6	5	0	318	36
Career total			287	33	16	2	5	2	68	6	7	0	385	43

== Honours ==
Shamrock Rovers

- League of Ireland Premier Division (5): 2020, 2021, 2022, 2023, 2025, 2026
- FAI Cup (2): 2019, 2025
- President of Ireland's Cup: 2022, 2024
