= Conor Keeley =

Irish footballer (born 1997)

Personal information
- Date of birth: 13 December 1997 (age 28)
- Place of birth: Dunboyne, County Meath, Ireland
- Position: Defender

Team information
- Current team: Drogheda United
- Number: 22

Youth career
- 2001–2007: St Kevin's Boys
- 2007–2009: Dunboyne
- 2009–2016: Shelbourne

Senior career*
| Years | Team | Apps | (Gls) |
| 2015–2016 | Shelbourne | 10 | (0) |
| 2017–2020 | Cabinteely | 73 | (9) |
| 2021–2023 | Ballymena United | 61 | (8) |
| 2023 | Drogheda United | 33 | (1) |
| 2024 | St Patrick's Athletic | 19 | (1) |
| 2025– | Drogheda United | 70 | (9) |
- * Club domestic league appearances and goals as of 18:28, 10 November 2026 (UTC)

Conor Keeley (born 13 December 1997) is an Irish professional footballer who plays as a defender for League of Ireland First Division club Drogheda United. His previous clubs are Shelbourne, Cabinteely, Ballymena United and St Patrick's Athletic.

== Career ==
=== Youth career ===
A native of Dunboyne, County Meath, Keeley began playing with top Dublin academy St Kevin's Boys, where he played from under-5s level to under 10's, before returning to his local side Dunboyne AFC for two years. He then moved on to the academy of League of Ireland club Shelbourne, where he won an under-13 SFAI Cup medal in his first season with the club.

=== Shelbourne ===
Keeley made his senior debut for Shelbourne on 17 October 2015, in a 2–0 win over Cobh Ramblers in the final game of the season. The 2016 season saw him struggle for appearances, making just 12 in all competitions resulting in him departing the club in search of more first team opportunities.

=== Cabinteely ===
Keeley signed for fellow League of Ireland First Division side Cabinteely ahead of the 2017 season and on 25 March 2017, he scored his first goal in senior football, in a 4–1 win over Cobh Ramblers. On 26 May 2017, he scored against his old side Shelbourne in a 4–1 win at Tolka Park. The 2019 season saw Keeley help the club to a 4th place playoff, qualifying them for the Promotion Playoffs, in which they defeated Longford Town on penalties in the first stage, which Keeley stated was the best moment of his career up to that point. He signed a new one-year contract with the club in January 2020. He departed the club at the end of the 2020 season, following 81 appearances and 9 goals in all competitions during his 4 seasons with the club.

=== Ballymena United ===
On 12 January 2021, Keeley signed a two-and-a-half-year contract with NIFL Premiership club Ballymena United. He scored his first goals for the club on 2–1 March 2021, scoring both goals in a 2–1 win at home to Linfield. On 10 December 2021, he scored in a 2–1 win at home to Larne. Keeley captained the side for the first time on 15 January 2022, in a 1–0 defeat away to Linfield. Keeley signed a new two-year contract with the club in July 2022. Keeley featured in all 5 of the club's games in their 2021–22 Irish Cup run, including the Final, as his side were defeated 2–1 by Crusaders at Windsor Park via a 121st-minute goal. On 31 December 2022, it was announced that the club had 'reluctantly' agreed to put Keeley on the transfer list to allow him his wish to move back closer to home. On 7 January 2023, he scored in what turned out to be his final appearance for the club, as they defeated Carrick Rangers on penalties after a 1–1 draw in the Irish Cup. He made a total of 70 appearances in all competitions for the club, scoring 9 goals.

=== Drogheda United ===
He signed for League of Ireland Premier Division club Drogheda United for an undisclosed fee on 10 January 2023. His first goal for the club came on 14 July 2023, in a 3–1 win away to UCD at the UCD Bowl. Keeley's performances drew interest from several clubs, including EFL League Two side Notts County, whom Drogheda rejected several bids for Keeley from in August 2023. He was voted Drogheda United Supporters Player of the Year for his performances in 2023.

=== St Patrick's Athletic ===
On 15 December 2023, it was announced that Keeley had signed a multi-year contract with St Patrick's Athletic. His first goal for the club came on 22 April 2024, volleying home a Brandon Kavanagh free-kick away to Derry City. On 8 October 2024, Keeley was part of the Pats side that defeated St Mochta's 2–1 in the final of the 2023–24 Leinster Senior Cup. On 17 December 2024, the club announced that his contract had been cancelled by mutual consent after he struggled for game time following the appointment of former Republic of Ireland manager Stephen Kenny in May.

=== Return to Drogheda United ===
On 17 December 2024, Keeley returned to his former club Drogheda United ahead of their 2025 season. He scored his first goal since returning to the club on 14 March 2025, opening the scoring in a 2–1 defeat at home to Shamrock Rovers. He scored an impressive 8 goals in 41 appearances in all competitions in his first season back at the club, which saw him voted into the PFAI Team of the Year by his fellow professionals. On 5 November 2025, he signed a new 1-year contract with the club. On 25 January 2026, he then signed a contract extension until the end of 2027. He scored 2 goals in 40 appearances in all competitions in 2026, as the club was relegated following a 2–1 defeat to UCD in the Promotion/Relegation Playoff.

== International career ==
Keeley featured for the Republic of Ireland Universities team in June 2018 in a 2–1 win over the second ranked team in the world at the time, France.

== Personal life ==
Keeley is the brother of fellow professional footballer Josh Keeley, who is a goalkeeper that began his career at St Patrick's Athletic, before moving on to Premier League side Tottenham Hotspur in the summer of 2022. Their father Brendan Keeley was also a goalkeeper, who played for NIFL Premiership club Newry City among others. As a teenager Keeley also played Gaelic football and in May 2014 he scored 2–4 for St Peters Dunboyne in their 3–7 to 2–5 victory over Summerhill as they won the MFL Div 1 title. He also represented Meath GAA at county minor level.

== Career statistics ==
As of match played on 7 November 2026

Appearances and goals by club, season and competition
| Club | Season | League | | | National Cup (Note: Includes FAI Cup & Irish Cup) | | League Cup (Note: Includes League of Ireland Cup & Northern Ireland League Cup) | | Europe | | Other | | Total | |
| Club | Season | Division | Apps | Goals | Apps | Goals | Apps | Goals | Apps | Goals | Apps | Goals | Apps | Goals |
|---|---|---|---|---|---|---|---|---|---|---|---|---|---|---|
| Shelbourne | 2015 | LOI First Division | 1 | 0 | 0 | 0 | 0 | 0 | — | | 0 (Note: Appearance(s) in the Leinster Senior Cup) | 0 | 1 | 0 |
| Shelbourne | 2016 | LOI First Division | 9 | 0 | 1 | 0 | 2 | 0 | — | | 0 | 0 | 12 | 0 |
| Shelbourne | Total | | 10 | 0 | 1 | 0 | 2 | 0 | – | | 0 | 0 | 13 | 0 |
| Cabinteely | 2017 | LOI First Division | 26 | 2 | 2 | 0 | 0 | 0 | — | | 0 | 0 | 28 | 2 |
| Cabinteely | 2018 | LOI First Division | 15 | 4 | 0 | 0 | 0 | 0 | — | | 0 | 0 | 15 | 4 |
| Cabinteely | 2019 | LOI First Division | 21 | 2 | 1 | 0 | 0 | 0 | — | | 4 (Note: Appearances in the 2019 League of Ireland Promotion Playoffs) | 0 | 26 | 2 |
| Cabinteely | 2020 | LOI First Division | 11 | 1 | 1 | 0 | 0 | 0 | — | | — | | 12 | 1 |
| Cabinteely | Total | | 73 | 9 | 4 | 0 | 0 | 0 | – | | 4 | 0 | 81 | 9 |
| Ballymena United | 2020–21 | NIFL Premiership | 17 | 4 | 2 | 0 | — | | — | | — | | 19 | 4 |
| Ballymena United | 2021–22 | NIFL Premiership | 27 | 2 | 5 | 0 | 3 | 0 | — | | 0 (Note: Appearance(s) in the County Antrim Shield) | 0 | 35 | 2 |
| Ballymena United | 2022–23 | NIFL Premiership | 17 | 2 | 1 | 1 | 1 | 0 | — | | 0 | 0 | 19 | 3 |
| Ballymena United | Total | | 61 | 8 | 8 | 1 | 4 | 0 | – | | 0 | 0 | 70 | 9 |
| Drogheda United | 2023 | LOI Premier Division | 33 | 1 | 3 | 0 | — | | — | | — | | 36 | 1 |
| St Patrick's Athletic | 2024 | LOI Premier Division | 19 | 1 | 0 | 0 | — | | 0 (Note: Apprarance(s) in the UEFA Conference League) | 0 | 4 (Note: 1 appearance in the President of Ireland's Cup & 3 appearances in the Leinster Senior Cup) | 0 | 23 | 1 |
| Drogheda United | 2025 | LOI Premier Division | 36 | 7 | 3 | 1 | — | | — | | 2 (Note: 1 appearance in the President of Ireland's Cup; 1 appearance in the Leinster Senior Cup) | 0 | 41 | 8 |
| Drogheda United | 2026 | LOI Premier Division | 34 | 2 | 3 | 0 | — | | – | | 3 (Note: 1 appearance in the 2026 League of Ireland play-offs; 2 appearances in the Leinster Senior Cup) | 0 | 40 | 2 |
| Drogheda United | Total | | 70 | 9 | 6 | 1 | — | | – | | 5 | 0 | 81 | 10 |
| Career Total | | | 266 | 28 | 22 | 2 | 6 | 0 | 0 | 0 | 13 | 0 | 307 | 30 |
