= Alfie Taylor =

English footballer (born 2004)

Personal information
- Full name: Alfie James Taylor
- Date of birth: 22 February 2004 (age 22)
- Place of birth: Kingston upon Hull, England
- Height: 1.85 m (6 ft 1 in)
- Position: Centre-back

Team information
- Current team: Grimsby Borough

Youth career
- 2012–2025: Hull City

Senior career*
Years	Team	Apps	(Gls)
2022–2025	Hull City	0	(0)
2024	→ St Patrick's Athletic (loan)	0	(0)
2024	→ Grimsby Borough (loan)	17	(0)
2025	→ Cleethorpes Town (loan)	7	(0)
2025–	Grimsby Borough	0	(0)
- * Club domestic league appearances and goals as of 10:54, 9 July 2025 (UTC)

Alfie James Taylor (born 22 February 2004) is an English professional footballer who plays as a centre-back for non-league side Grimsby Borough.

== Club career ==
=== Hull City ===
Taylor joined the Hull City academy at U9 level. He progressed through the club's academy setup and signed his first professional contract on 11 May 2022. Taylor was first included in the senior team squad on 15 April 2023, making the bench in the 0–0 draw away at Blackburn Rovers.

==== St Patrick's Athletic (loan) ====
On 9 January 2024, Taylor signed a season-long loan deal with League of Ireland Premier Division side St Patrick's Athletic. On 27 May 2024, Taylor scored his first professional goal, the first in a 3–0 win over Bray Wanderers in the Leinster Senior Cup. Having only featured for the Saints in the Leinster Senior Cup aside from friendlies, Hull recalled Taylor from his loan spell on 25 June 2024.

==== Grimsby Borough (loan) ====
On 23 August 2024, Taylor and fellow-Hull academy player Jaedyn Chibanga joined Grimsby Borough on initial three-month loan deals. He remained with the club until the end of December 2024 and made a total of 19 appearances in all competitions during his time on loan.

==== Cleethorpes Town (loan) ====
On 18 March 2025, Taylor joined NPL Division One East league leaders Cleethorpes Town on loan for the remainder of the season.

=== Grimsby Borough ===
After his contract expired with Hull, Taylor returned to Grimsby Borough on a permanent basis, arriving on 7 July 2025.

== Career statistics ==
As of match played on 22 March 2025

Appearances and goals by club, season and competition
Club	Season	League			National Cup		League Cup		Other		Total	
Club	Season	Division	Apps	Goals	Apps	Goals	Apps	Goals	Apps	Goals	Apps	Goals
Hull City	2022–23	Championship	0	0	0	0	0	0	—		0	0
Hull City	2023–24	Championship	0	0	0	0	0	0	—		0	0
Hull City	2024–25	Championship	0	0	0	0	0	0	—		0	0
Hull City	Total		0	0	0	0	0	0	—		0	0
St Patrick's Athletic (loan)	2024	LOI Premier Division	0	0	0	0	—		3 (Note: Appearances in the Leinster Senior Cup)	1	3	1
Grimsby Borough (loan)	2024–25	NPL Division One East	17	0	—		—		2 (Note: 1 appearance in the FA Trophy & 1 appearance in the Lincolnshire Senior Cup)	0	19	0
Cleethorpes Town (loan)	2024–25	NPL Division One East	1	0	—		—		—		1	0
Career total			18	0	0	0	0	0	5	1	23	1
