= Cian Kavanagh =

Irish footballer

Personal information
- Full name: Cian James Kavanagh
- Date of birth: 3 January 2003 (age 23)
- Place of birth: Dublin, Republic of Ireland
- Height: 1.85 m (6 ft 1 in)
- Position: Forward

Youth career
- 2017–2019: St Patrick's Athletic

Senior career*
Years	Team	Apps	(Gls)
2019	St Patrick's Athletic	0	(0)
2019–2020	Heart of Midlothian	0	(0)
2020–2021	Cowdenbeath	4	(1)
2021–2022	Waterford	31	(9)
2022–2023	Derry City	33	(3)
2024	St Patrick's Athletic	18	(1)
2025–2026	Sligo Rovers	59	(11)
- * Club domestic league appearances and goals as of 11:45, 13 November 2026 (UTC)

Cian James Kavanagh (born 3 January 2003) is an Irish professional footballer who plays as a forward. His previous clubs are St Patrick's Athletic (where he spent 2 spells), Heart of Midlothian, Cowdenbeath, Waterford, Derry City and Sligo Rovers.

== Career ==
=== Youth career ===
A native of Baldoyle, Dublin, Kavanagh came through the academy of League of Ireland Premier Division side St Patrick's Athletic whom he signed for in 2017, where he featured for the under 15, under 17 and under 19s sides. In October 2018, he scored twice in a 4–0 win over Cork City in the National Under 15 Cup Final at Richmond Park.

=== St Patrick's Athletic ===
He was included in the first team by manager Harry Kenny ahead of the 2019 season, aged 16. He made his first appearance with the St Patrick's Athletic first team on 19 January 2019, in a 4–1 win over Cobh Ramblers in a pre-season friendly. On 13 July 2019, he was an unused substitute in a friendly against UEFA Europa League holders Chelsea.

=== Heart of Midlothian ===
Kavanagh signed a 3-year contract with Heart of Midlothian on 30 August 2019. He failed to make a first team appearance and departed the club in September 2020 in search of first team opportunities.

=== Cowdenbeath ===
In September 2020, he signed for Scottish League Two side Cowdenbeath. On 28 November 2020, he scored the first senior goal of his career, in a 5–2 defeat away to Elgin City. In February 2021, the club agreed to release Kavanagh with immediate affect to allow him to return home to Ireland as the squad were on furlough and unable to train or play matches due to the COVID-19 restrictions in Scotland. He scored 1 goal in 9 appearances in all competitions during his short spell with the club.

=== Waterford ===
On 23 February 2021, Kavanagh signed for League of Ireland Premier Division side Waterford. On 26 March 2021, he scored his first goal for the club, opening the scoring in a 2–1 defeat against Sligo Rovers. On 18 July 2021, he scored from 25 yards to secure a 1–0 win for his side at home to Sligo Rovers. He scored twice in a 4–1 win over Longford Town at the RSC on 20 August 2021. He would only feature once more that season due to injury however, and his 4 goals in 14 league appearances wasn't enough to help the club avoid relegation to the League of Ireland First Division. He started off the 2022 season off well, scoring 5 goals in 17 games by July, which drew attention from League of Ireland Premier Division clubs.

=== Derry City ===
On 29 July 2022, it was announced that Kavanagh had signed for League of Ireland Premier Division side Derry City for an undisclosed fee, on an 18-month deal. On 30 September 2022, he came off the bench away to St Patrick's Athletic to score the winner in an important 1–0 victory for his side. On 13 November 2022, Kavanagh was part of the squad in the 2022 FAI Cup Final, which resulted in a 4–0 win over Shelbourne at the Aviva Stadium, a record Cup Final scoreline margin. On 10 February 2023, he started in the 2023 President of Ireland's Cup, as his side defeated Shamrock Rovers 2–0 at the Ryan McBride Brandywell Stadium to win the trophy. He scored an equaliser in a 2–2 draw away to Dundalk on 16 April 2023 at Oriel Park. On 5 June 2023, he scored a consolation goal in a 4–1 defeat to St Patrick's Athletic at Richmond Park. His second season with Derry saw him feature in 4 of the 6 games in their UEFA Europa Conference League campaign, playing and scoring both home and away against KuPS of Finland. He also featured in both legs against Tobol of Kazakhstan, against whom he scored in the penalty shootout in the second leg at Tallaght Stadium, as his side were defeated 6–5 on penalties. It was announced in November 2023 that Kavanagh would be let go by the club following the end of his contract after scoring 5 goals in 40 appearances in his time with the club.

=== St Patrick's Athletic ===
On 22 November 2023, it was announced that Kavanagh had signed a contract with his first senior club, St Patrick's Athletic. He made his debut for the club on 22 January in a Leinster Senior Cup game away to Usher Celtic and scored a penalty that he won himself less than a minute after coming on as a half time substitute. Kavanagh's first league goal for the club came on 24 May 2024, in a 2–2 draw away to Bohemians at Dalymount Park after he had replaced Ruairí Keating from the bench early on following a concussion he suffered in the first action of the game. On 8 October 2024, Kavanagh was part of the Pats side that defeated St Mochta's 2–1 in the final of the 2023–24 Leinster Senior Cup. On 29 November 2024, it was announced that Kavanagh had departed the club by mutual consent.

=== Sligo Rovers ===
On 29 November 2024, Kavanagh signed a 2-year contract with League of Ireland Premier Division club Sligo Rovers. On 14 February 2025, Kavanagh missed a penalty on his debut, with Waterford going straight up the other end and scoring what turned out to be the winning goal of the game in a 3–2 defeat at The Showgrounds. He scored his first goals for the club on 28 February 2025, when he scored a brace and also missed a penalty in a 4–3 defeat away to his former club St Patrick's Athletic. He scored 5 goals in 27 games in his first season with the club. Kavanagh was the club's top scorer in 2026 with 8 goals in 34 appearances in all competitions as they finished bottom of the league and were relegated to play in the League of Ireland First Division for the first time since 2006. At the end of the season the club confirmed that Kavanagh had left the club following the end of his contract.

== International career ==
In October 2021, Kavanagh was called up for the Republic of Ireland U21 side for an away game against Montenegro U21.

== Career statistics ==
As of match played on 30 October 2026

Appearances and goals by club, season and competition
Club	Season	League			National Cup (Note: Includes FAI Cup & Scottish Cup)		League Cup (Note: Includes League of Ireland Cup & Scottish League Cup)		Europe		Other		Total	
Club	Season	Division	Apps	Goals	Apps	Goals	Apps	Goals	Apps	Goals	Apps	Goals	Apps	Goals
St Patrick's Athletic	2019	LOI Premier Division	0	0	0	0	0	0	0 (Note: Appearance(s) in the UEFA Europa League)	0	0 (Note: Appearance(s) in the Leinster Senior Cup)	0	0	0
Heart of Midlothian	2019–20	Scottish Premiership	0	0	0	0	0	0	—		—		0	0
Cowdenbeath	2020–21	Scottish League Two	4	1	1	0	4	0	—		—		9	1
Waterford	2021	LOI Premier Division	14	4	2	0	—		—		0 (Note: Appearance in the 2021 League of Ireland Promotion/Relegation Playoff)	0	16	4
Waterford	2022	LOI First Division	17	5	—		—		—		0	0	17	5
Waterford	Total		31	9	2	0	—		—		0	0	33	9
Derry City	2022	LOI Premier Division	6	1	1	0	—		—		—		7	1
Derry City	2023	LOI Premier Division	27	2	1	0	—		4 (Note: Appearance(s) in the UEFA Europa Conference League)	2	1 (Note: Appearance in the President of Ireland's Cup)	0	33	4
Derry City	Total		33	3	2	0	—		4	2	1	0	40	5
St Patrick's Athletic	2024	LOI Premier Division	18	1	1	0	—		2 (Note: Appearance(s) in the UEFA Conference League)	0	4 (Note: 1 appearance in the President of Ireland's Cup & 3 appearances, 3 goals in the Leinster Senior Cup)	3	25	4
Sligo Rovers	2025	LOI Premier Division	27	5	0	0	—		—		—		27	5
Sligo Rovers	2026	LOI Premier Division	32	6	2	2	—		—		—		34	8
Sligo Rovers	Total		59	11	2	2	—		—		—		61	13
Total			145	25	8	2	4	0	6	2	5	3	168	32

== Honours ==
Derry City

- FAI Cup (1): 2022
- President of Ireland's Cup (1): 2023

St Patrick's Athletic

- Leinster Senior Cup (1): 2023–24
