= Ruairí Keating =

Irish footballer (born 1995)

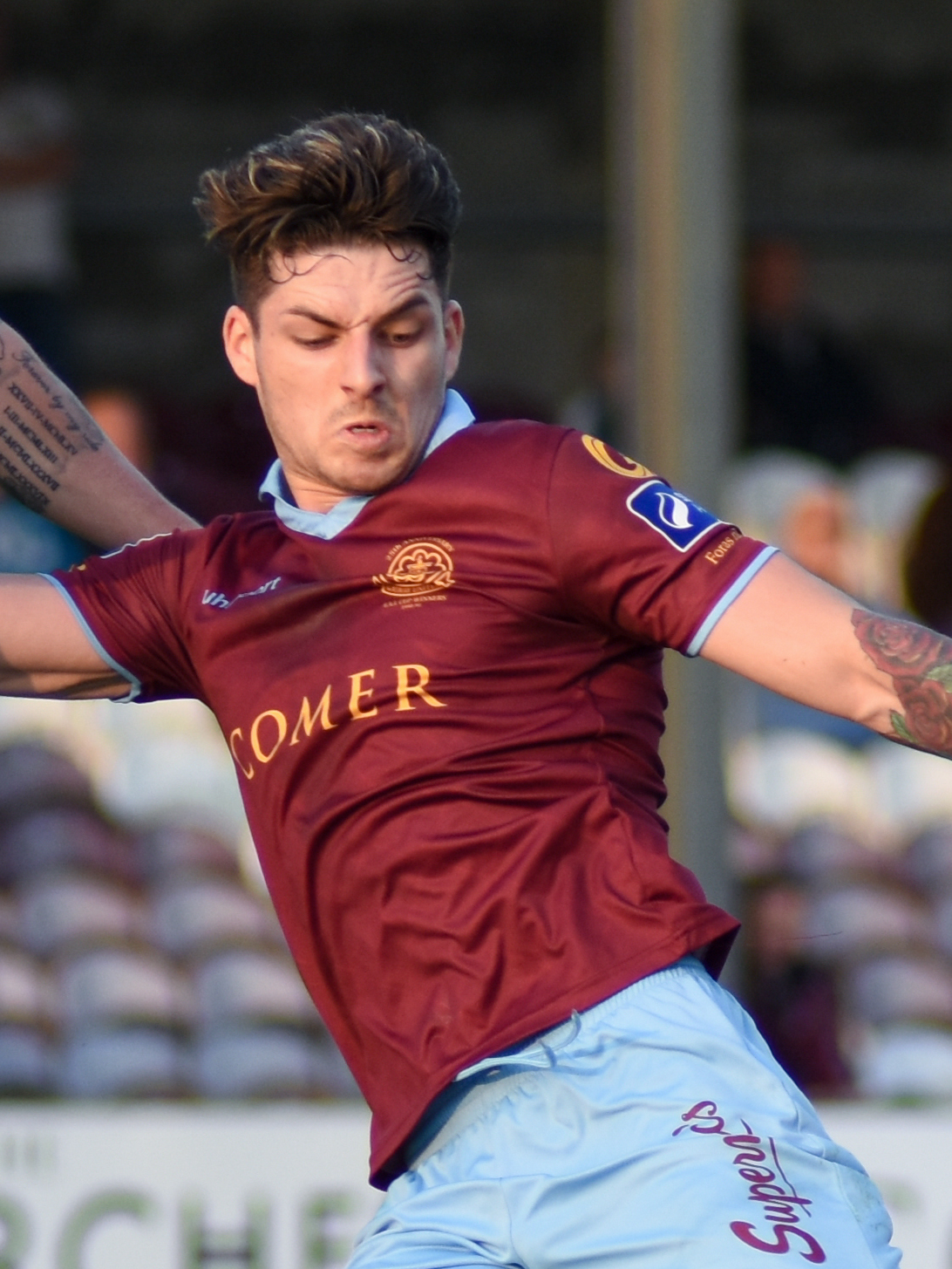
- Keating in action for Galway United in 2016.

Personal information
- Full name: Ruairí Thomas Keating
- Date of birth: 16 July 1995 (age 31)
- Place of birth: Dublin, Ireland
- Position: Forward

Team information
- Current team: Cork City
- Number: 9

Youth career
- Westport United
- 2013–2014: Sligo Rovers

Senior career*
Years	Team	Apps	(Gls)
2014–2015	Sligo Rovers	21	(1)
2014	→ Finn Harps (loan)	12	(5)
2015	→ Finn Harps (loan)	10	(5)
2016	Galway United	14	(2)
2016	Finn Harps	11	(1)
2017–2020	Torquay United	107	(14)
2020	Gateshead	9	(2)
2021	Galway United	25	(9)
2022–2023	Cork City	62	(26)
2024	St Patrick's Athletic	22	(4)
2024–	Cork City	54	(25)
- * Club domestic league appearances and goals as of 00:26, 28 October 2026 (UTC)

Ruairí Thomas Keating (born 16 July 1995) is an Irish professional footballer who plays as a forward for League of Ireland Premier Division club Cork City. His previous clubs are Sligo Rovers, Finn Harps, Galway United, Torquay United, Gateshead and St Patrick's Athletic.

== Career ==
=== Early life ===
Born in Dublin, Keating grew up in Westport, County Mayo and played with local side Westport United. He joined Sligo Rovers U19 side in 2013, before signing his first professional contract with the club in 2014.

=== Sligo Rovers ===
Upon signing his first contract with Sligo Rovers in January 2014, Keating was sent out on loan to League of Ireland First Division side Finn Harps until the end of June 2014, in order to gain first team experience. Upon returning from his loan spell, he made his senior debut for the club on 7 July 2014, in a 0–0 draw with Cork City. On 17 July 2014, he made his first appearance in European football, coming off the bench in a 2–1 win away to Rosenborg BK in the UEFA Europa League. After spending the first half of the 2015 season back on loan at Finn Harps, Keating scored his first goal at senior level for Sligo on 30 October 2015, scoring a 91st minute consolation goal in a 3–2 defeat at home to Limerick.

=== Finn Harps loans ===
Keating signed for Finn Harps on a 6-month loan deal in February 2014. He made his debut in senior football in a 0–0 draw with Waterford United on the opening night of the season. His first goal at senior level came on 10 March 2014 in a 3–2 win over Cockhill Celtic in the League of Ireland Cup. He impressed during his loan spell, scoring 6 goals in 13 appearances in all competitions before returning to Sligo Rovers for the remainder of the season. Ahead of the 2015 League of Ireland First Division, Keating was again loaned to Finn Harps for the first half of the season. He scored 5 goals in 10 games in his second loan spell before again returning to his parent club for the second half of the season.

=== Galway United ===
On 18 January 2016, Keating signed a season long contract with Galway United. He scored his first goal for the club on 11 March 2016, scoring his sides 4th goal in a 4–0 win over Bray Wanderers. He departed the club midway through the season following 2 goals in 18 appearances in all competitions.

=== Finn Harps (third spell) ===
On 6 July 2016, Keating signed for fellow League of Ireland Premier Division side Finn Harps, where he had previously spent 2 loan spells in the past, on a permanent basis until the end of the season.

=== Torquay United ===
Keating made the move to English football on 9 February 2017, signing for National League side Torquay United. He featured 41 times in his first full season with the club, scoring 4 goals but it wasn't enough to secure their league status, as the club were relegated to the National League South in April 2018. On 9 June 2018, Keating signed a new 1-year contract with the club. On 11 January 2019, he signed a contract extension with the club. He scored 5 goals during the 2018–19 season as his side won the National League South title. Keating departed the club in January 2020, after he saw his game time reduced following promotion back to the National League.

=== Gateshead ===
On 24 January 2020, Keating signed for National League North side Gateshead on a permanent basis, in search of regular first team football. He scored 2 goals in 11 appearances during his short time with the club, before departing by mutual consent in November 2020.

=== Galway United (second spell) ===
Keating returned to Ireland, signing for Galway United for the second time in his career, ahead of their 2021 League of Ireland First Division campaign. Keating scored 9 goals in 28 games in all competitions over the season, as Galway were knocked out of the playoffs by Bray Wanderers.

=== Cork City ===
Keating signed for Cork City for the 2022 season. His first season with the club was a success, as the club won the 2022 League of Ireland First Division title to gain promotion, with Keating finishing up as his side's top goalscorer with 13 league goals. On 9 December 2022, Keating signed a new contract with the club for their 2023 League of Ireland Premier Division campaign. On 12 July 2023, it was announced that Keating signed a new long-term contract with the club. On 1 September 2023, Keating scored a hat-trick in a 3–0 win over Sligo Rovers, dedicating his goals to his late father, who had recently died. His performances in September 2023 saw him named League of Ireland Player of the Month. On 10 November 2023, Keating was forced off at half time with an arm injury in the 2023 League of Ireland Premier Division Play-off as his side lost 2–1 to Waterford at Tallaght Stadium, resulting in relegation back to the League of Ireland First Division. On 15 November 2023, it was announced that Keating had been included in the PFAI Team of the Year and was also one of the 3 nominees for the PFAI Player of the Year award, alongside Chris Forrester and Jonathan Afolabi.

=== St Patrick's Athletic ===
On 23 November 2023, it was announced that Keating had signed for recent FAI Cup winners St Patrick's Athletic on a long-term contract. He made his debut for the club on 3 February 2024, scoring two of his sides goals in a 3–1 win away to UCD in the Leinster Senior Cup. Keating scored his first goal for the club on 1 March 2024, opening the scoring away to Derry City at the Ryan McBride Brandywell Stadium. He scored his first home goal for the club on 8 March 2024, in a 1–0 win over Dundalk at Richmond Park. On 3 May 2024, he scored the only goal of the game to secure the win for his side at home to Drogheda United. On 24 May 2024, Keating suffered a nasty head injury in the very first action of the game in a 2–2 draw away to Bohemians when contesting a header with Aboubacar Keita, he was discharged from hospital the following day and missed a number of games through concussion. On 13 June 2024, he came off the bench in the 61st minute before scoring the equaliser 15 minutes later in an eventual 2–1 win at home to rivals Shamrock Rovers. On 28 July 2024, it was announced that Keating had left the club by mutual consent.

=== Return to Cork City ===
On 28 July 2024, Keating returned to Cork City to help their League of Ireland First Division charge for the title and promotion. His first goal since his return came on 23 August 2024, when he scored a 91st-minute header in a 1–0 victory away to Cobh Ramblers in the Cork derby. On 6 September 2024, he was part of the side that defeated UCD 1–0 at the UCD Bowl to win promotion by winning the 2024 League of Ireland First Division. He scored his first goal of the 2025 season on 28 February 2025, an 83rd-minute winner in a 2–1 victory over Bohemians at Turners Cross. Keating started the season in good form, scoring 3 goals in the first 7 league games of the season, until he ruptured his Achilles tendon away to Derry City at the Ryan McBride Brandywell Stadium on 4 April 2025, with the injury set to keep him out of action for six to nine months. He made his return from injury on 1 November 2025 in a 1–0 defeat at home to Derry City in the final league game of the season in which the club were relegated after finishing bottom of the table. On 9 November 2025, he came off the bench in the 2025 FAI Cup final as his side were beaten 2–0 by Shamrock Rovers at the Aviva Stadium. On 4 September 2026, he featured in a 1–1 draw away to Bray Wanderers, a result that secured the 2026 League of Ireland First Division title and promotion back to the Premier Division. On 18 September 2026, he scored a Hat-trick in a 5–1 win over UCD. On 8 October 2026, Keating signed a new two-year contract extension with the club.

== Personal life ==
He is the nephew of Boyzone singer Ronan Keating. As well as the Republic of Ireland, Keating is also eligible to represent the United States at international level, through his Queens, New York City born grandmother. On 15 July 2023, Keating's father Ciaran was killed in a car crash on the N5, near Swinford, County Mayo, while travelling to Sligo to watch his son play for Cork City against Sligo Rovers. Keating's mother Ann Marie was also in the vehicle but survived the crash and was admitted to hospital for her injuries.

== Career statistics ==
As of match played on 16 October 2026

Appearances and goals by club, season and competition
Club	Season	League			National Cup (Note: Includes FAI Cup & FA Cup)		League Cup (Note: Includes League of Ireland Cup)		Europe		Other		Total	
Club	Season	Division	Apps	Goals	Apps	Goals	Apps	Goals	Apps	Goals	Apps	Goals	Apps	Goals
Sligo Rovers	2014	LOI Premier Division	14	0	—		—		2 (Note: Appearance(s) in UEFA Europa League)	0	—		16	0
Sligo Rovers	2015	LOI Premier Division	7	1	0	0	—		—		—		7	1
Sligo Rovers	Total		21	1	0	0	–		2	0	—		23	1
Finn Harps (loan)	2014	LOI First Division	12	5	1	0	1	1	—		—		13	6
Finn Harps (loan)	2015	LOI First Division	10	5	—		1	0	—		—		11	5
Galway United	2016	LOI Premier Division	14	2	1	0	3	0	—		—		18	2
Finn Harps	2016	LOI Premier Division	11	1	—		—		—		—		11	1
Torquay United	2016–17	National League	15	3	—		—		—		—		15	3
Torquay United	2017–18	National League	39	4	1	0	—		—		1 (Note: Appearance(s) in FA Trophy)	0	41	4
Torquay United	2018–19	National League South	34	5	2	0	—		—		1	0	38	5
Torquay United	2019–20	National League	19	2	2	0	—		—		2	1	23	3
Torquay United	Total		107	14	5	0	—		—		4	1	116	15
Gateshead	2019–20	National League North	6	2	—		—		—		2 (Note: Appearances in 2019–20 National League North play-offs)	0	8	2
Gateshead	2020–21	National League North	3	0	0	0	—		—		—		3	0
Gateshead	Total		9	2	0	0	–		—		2	0	11	2
Galway United	2021	LOI First Division	25	9	1	0	—		—		2 (Note: Appearances in 2021 League of Ireland First Division Play-offs)	0	28	9
Cork City	2022	LOI First Division	28	13	2	1	—		—		0	0	30	14
Cork City	2023	LOI Premier Division	34	13	3	2	—		—		2 (Note: 1 appearance in Munster Senior Cup & 1 appearance in 2023 League of Ireland Promotion/Relegation Division play-off)	0	39	15
Cork City	Total		62	26	5	3	—		—		2	0	69	29
St Patrick's Athletic	2024	LOI Premier Division	22	4	0	0	—		0 (Note: Appearance(s) in UEFA Conference League)	0	2 (Note: 1 appearance in President of Ireland's Cup & 1 appearance, 2 goals in Leinster Senior Cup)	2	24	6
Cork City	2024	LOI First Division	10	5	1	0	—		—		—		11	5
Cork City	2025	LOI Premier Division	8	3	1	0	—		—		1 (Note: Appearance(s) in the Munster Senior Cup)	1	10	4
Cork City	2026	LOI First Division	36	17	1	1	—		—		0	0	37	18
Cork City	Total		54	25	3	1	—		—		1	1	58	27
Career total			347	94	16	4	5	1	2	0	13	4	383	103
