= Axel Sjöberg =

Axel Sjöberg may refer to:

- Axel Sjöberg (footballer, born 1991), Swedish football centre back
- Axel Sjöberg (footballer, born 2000), Swedish football right-back
- Axel Sjöberg (curler) (born 1995), Swedish curler
- Axel Sjöberg (painter) (1866–1950), Swedish painter
