= Anthony Breslin =

Irish footballer

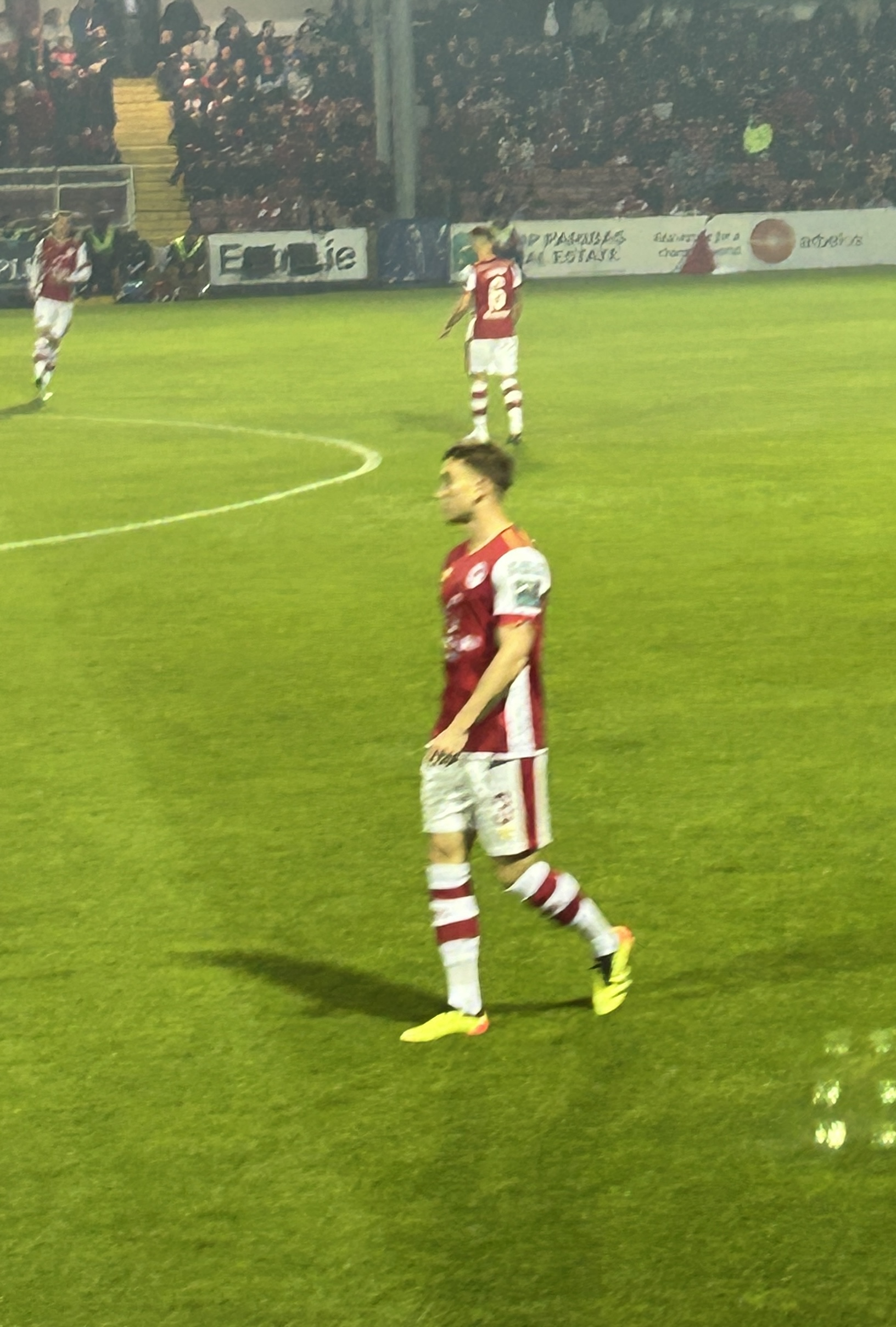
- Breslin in action for St Patrick's Athletic in 2024.

Personal information
- Full name: Anthony Breslin
- Date of birth: 13 February 1997 (age 29)
- Place of birth: Dublin, Ireland
- Position: Left back

Team information
- Current team: St Patrick's Athletic
- Number: 3

Youth career
- –2013: St Kevin's Boys
- 2013–2016: Wolverhampton Wanderers

Senior career*
Years	Team	Apps	(Gls)
2016–2018	Wolverhampton Wanderers	0	(0)
2016	→ Tamworth (loan)	12	(0)
2019	Longford Town	26	(1)
2020–2021	Bohemians	37	(1)
2022–	St Patrick's Athletic	146	(4)

International career^{‡}
2012	Republic of Ireland U15	1	(0)
2012–2013	Republic of Ireland U16	4	(0)
2013–2014	Republic of Ireland U17	8	(0)
2015	Republic of Ireland U18	2	(0)
2015	Republic of Ireland U19	3	(0)
- * Club domestic league appearances and goals as of 23:45, 30 October 2026 (UTC) ‡ National team caps and goals as of 01:14, 23 November 2023 (UTC)

Anthony "Anto" Breslin (born 13 February 1997) is an Irish professional footballer who plays as a defender for League of Ireland Premier Division club St Patrick's Athletic. His previous clubs are Wolverhampton Wanderers, Tamworth, Longford Town and Bohemians.

== Career ==
=== Youth career ===
A native of Blanchardstown, Dublin, Breslin came through top Dublin academy St Kevin's Boys, before signing for the academy of Wolverhampton Wanderers in 2013.

=== Wolverhampton Wanderers ===
On 4 October 2016, Breslin made his first appearance in senior football when he featured in the EFL Trophy side that beat Crewe Alexandra 3–2 away from home. He went on to make a total of 4 appearances in his sides 2016–17 EFL Trophy campaign. On 20 May 2018, it was announced that Breslin had been released by the club following the end of his contract.

==== Tamworth loan ====
In August 2016, Breslin signed for National League North side Tamworth on a short-term loan deal until the end of September. He featured 12 times for the club during his loan spell.

=== Longford Town ===
After spending time on trial at Shamrock Rovers, Breslin signed for League of Ireland First Division side Longford Town in December 2018, ahead of the 2019 campaign. He made his debut for the club in the first game of the season, in a 0–0 draw away to Limerick on 22 February 2019. He scored his first goal of his senior career on 2 August 2019 in a 5–1 win away to Midlands rivals Athlone Town. He made 27 appearances in all competitions for the club, scoring once. After an impressive season with the club, he was linked with a move to League of Ireland Premier Division side Bohemians. He was voted into the PFAI First Division Team of the Year by his fellow players at the end of the season.

=== Bohemians ===
In November 2019, it was confirmed that Breslin had made the step up to the League of Ireland Premier Division by signing for Bohemians. His first goal for Bohs came on 22 August 2020 when he opened the scoring in a 2–0 win over St Patrick's Athletic at Dalymount Park. On 27 August 2020, he made his first appearance in European football, playing the full 120 minutes as his side were beaten on penalties in their UEFA Europa League tie after a 1–1 draw away to Fehérvár of Hungary. During July and August 2021, he featured in 5 of the 6 games in the club's UEFA Europa Conference League campaign, playing at home to Stjarnan of Iceland, and home & away against both F91 Dudelange of Luxembourg and PAOK of Greece. He remained an unused substitute in the 2021 FAI Cup Final at the Aviva Stadium as his side were defeated by rivals St Patrick's Athletic, amidst reports that Breslin would be leaving the club. Breslin confirmed his departure from the club in December 2021.

=== St Patrick's Athletic ===
On 18 December 2021, Breslin signed for St Patrick's Athletic on a 3-year contract, becoming new manager Tim Clancy's first signing for the club. He made his debut for the club on 11 February 2022, in the 2022 President of Ireland's Cup against Shamrock Rovers at Tallaght Stadium, playing the full 90 minutes as his side lost 5–4 on penalties after a 1–1 draw. He scored his first goal for the club on 2 September 2022, in a 2–1 win over Finn Harps at Richmond Park. On 6 November 2022, he scored in a 4–0 win at home to rivals Shelbourne in the final game of the season. On 12 November 2023, Breslin played there full 90 minutes in the 2023 FAI Cup Final, in a 3–1 win for his side over his former club Bohemians in front of a record breaking FAI Cup Final crowd of 43,881 at the Aviva Stadium. On 4 March 2024, he scored his first goal since November 2022 with a first half equaliser away to Waterford at the RSC. On 17 May 2024, Breslin made his 100th appearance in all competitions for the club in a 1–0 defeat to Derry City, in what was new manager Stephen Kenny's first game in charge of the club. Breslin featured in all 6 of the club's UEFA Conference League games during the summer of 2024, as they beat Vaduz of Liechtenstein and Sabah of Azerbaijan before a narrow 2–0 defeat on aggregate against Turkish side İstanbul Başakşehir in the Play-Off Round of the competition. On 29 October 2024, Breslin signed a new long-term contract with the club. During the 2025 season Breslin lost his place in the first choice starting XI for the first time since joining the club, with manager Stephen Kenny instead opting to start Al-Amin Kazeem, or Jason McClelland in an unfamiliar left back role for him, coupled with a Patellar tendon injury Breslin suffered in early August 2025 resulted in him failing to start any of the 6 UEFA Conference League games in the club's European campaign. On 10 October 2025, he made his return from injury by playing the first half of a 4–0 win over St Mochta's in the Leinster Senior Cup, scoring a header from a corner to help earn his side a place in the final, in what was his first game in over 2 months. On 3 April 2026, he replaced the injured Jason McClelland from the bench early on, before scoring his side's third goal in a 4–1 victory over Sligo Rovers by rounding goalkeeper Sam Sargeant to finish. On 5 September 2026, he opened the scoring in the FAI Cup Quarter Final against his former club Bohemians.

== International career ==
Breslin has represented the Republic of Ireland at under 15, under 16, under 17, under 18 and under 19 level.

== Career statistics ==
As of match played on 30 October 2026

Appearances and goals by club, season and competition
Club	Season	League			National Cup (Note: Includes FA Cup & FAI Cup)		League Cup (Note: Includes EFL Cup & League of Ireland Cup)		Europe		Other		Total	
Club	Season	Division	Apps	Goals	Apps	Goals	Apps	Goals	Apps	Goals	Apps	Goals	Apps	Goals
Wolverhampton Wanderers	2016–17	EFL Championship	0	0	0	0	0	0	—		4 (Note: Appearance(s) for Wolverhampton Wanderers U23 in the EFL Trophy)	0	4	0
Wolverhampton Wanderers	2017–18	EFL Championship	0	0	0	0	0	0	—		0	0	0	0
Wolverhampton Wanderers	Total		0	0	0	0	—		—		4	0	4	0
Tamworth (loan)	2016–17	National League North	12	0	—		—		—		—		12	0
Longford Town	2019	LOI First Division	26	1	1	0	0	0	—		0 (Note: Appearance(s) in the Leinster Senior Cup)	0	27	1
Bohemians	2020	LOI Premier Division	15	1	0	0	—		1 (Note: Appearance(s) in the UEFA Europa League)	0	—		16	1
Bohemians	2021	LOI Premier Division	22	0	2	0	—		5 (Note: Appearance(s) in the UEFA Europa Conference League)	0	—		29	0
Bohemians	Total		37	1	2	0	—		6	0	—		45	1
St Patrick's Athletic	2022	LOI Premier Division	32	2	1	0	—		4	0	1 (Note: Appearance in the President of Ireland's Cup)	0	38	2
St Patrick's Athletic	2023	LOI Premier Division	36	0	5	0	—		2	0	0	0	43	0
St Patrick's Athletic	2024	LOI Premier Division	30	1	1	0	—		6 (Note: Appearance(s) in the UEFA Conference League)	0	2 (Note: 1 appearance in the President of Ireland's Cup & 1 appearance in the Leinster Senior Cup)	0	39	1
St Patrick's Athletic	2025	LOI Premier Division	19	0	1	0	—		2	0	5	1	27	1
St Patrick's Athletic	2026	LOI Premier Division	29	1	3	1	—		—		1	0	33	2
St Patrick's Athletic	Total		146	4	11	1	—		14	0	9	1	180	6
Career total			221	6	14	1	0	0	20	0	13	1	268	8

== Honours ==
=== Club ===
St Patrick's Athletic

- FAI Cup (1): 2023
- Leinster Senior Cup (1): 2023–24

=== Individual ===
- PFAI First Division Team of the Year (1): 2019
