= 2025 St Patrick's Athletic F.C. season =

Irish football club season

St Patrick's Athletic F.C.
2025 season
- Chairman: Garrett Kelleher
- Manager: Stephen Kenny
- Stadium: Richmond Park, Inchicore, Dublin 8
- League of Ireland Premier Division: 5th
- FAI Cup: Semi Final (Eliminated by Cork City)
- UEFA Conference League: Third Qualifying Round (Eliminated by Beşiktaş)
- Leinster Senior Cup: Runners-up (to Dundalk)
- Top goalscorer: League: Mason Melia (13 goals); All: Mason Melia (15 goals)
- Highest home attendance: 7,821 vs Beşiktaş (7 August)
- Lowest home attendance: 600 (Est.) vs Dundalk (26 October)
Home colours	Away colours	Third colours

The 2025 season was St Patrick's Athletic F.C.'s 96th year in existence and was the Supersaint's 74th consecutive season in the top-flight of Irish football. It was the first full season in charge for manager Stephen Kenny, having taken over from Jon Daly in May 2024. Pre-season training for the squad began in the first week of December 2024. The fixtures were released on 17 December 2024, with Pat's down to play 2024 FAI Cup winners Drogheda United at home in the opening game of the season.

In a disappointing season, the team finished in 5th place in the league, were defeated 3–0 by bottom of the table Cork City in the Semi Final of the FAI Cup, exited the UEFA Conference League at the Third Qualifying Round to Turkish giants Beşiktaş and were defeated in the final of the Leinster Senior Cup by Dundalk.

== Squad ==
No.	Name	Position(s)	Nationality	Hometown	Date of birth (age)	Previous club	Year signed	Club apps.	Club goals
Goalkeepers
1	Danny Rogers	GK	(Republic of Ireland)	(United States) New York City, New York State	23 March 1994 (age 32)	(England) Oldham Athletic	2022	41	0
29	Matt Boylan	GK	(Republic of Ireland)	(England) Welwyn Garden City, Hertfordshire	4 July 2004 (age 22)	(England) Bromley	2023	0	0
49	Sean Molloy	GK	(Republic of Ireland)	Dublin	2 August 2004 (age 22)	(Republic of Ireland) Inchicore Athletic	2025	0	0
94	Joseph Anang	GK	(Ghana)	Teshie, Accra	8 June 2000 (age 26)	(England) West Ham United	2024	95	0
Defenders
2	Seán Hoare	CB	(Republic of Ireland)	Castleknock, Dublin	5 March 1994 (age 32)	(Republic of Ireland) Shamrock Rovers	2025	115	4
3	Anthony Breslin	LB	(Republic of Ireland)	Blanchardstown, Dublin	13 February 1997 (age 29)	(Republic of Ireland) Bohemians	2022	147	4
4	Joe Redmond	CB	(Republic of Ireland)	Tallaght, Dublin	21 January 2000 (age 26)	(Republic of Ireland) Drogheda United	2022	155	12
5	Tom Grivosti	CB	(England)	West Derby, Liverpool	15 June 1999 (age 27)	(Scotland) Ross County	2022	100	3
21	Axel Sjöberg	RB	(Sweden)	Helsingborg, Skåne County	12 April 2000 (age 26)	(Sweden) BK Olympic	2023	71	0
23	Ryan McLaughlin	RB	(Northern Ireland)	Andersonstown, Belfast	30 September 1994 (age 32)	(England) Morecambe	2023	53	1
24	Luke Turner	CB	(Republic of Ireland)	Drimnagh, Dublin	20 May 2002 (age 24)	(Northern Ireland) Cliftonville	2024	54	5
30	Al-Amin Kazeem	LB	(England)	England	6 April 2002 (age 24)	(England) Colchester United	2024	38	2
32	Billy Canny	RB	(Republic of Ireland)	Howth, Dublin	28 May 2008 (age 18)	(Republic of Ireland) St Patrick's Athletic Academy	2024	0	0
36	Jonathan Kehir	CB	(Republic of Ireland)	Leixlip, Kildare	7 February 2006 (age 20)	(Republic of Ireland) St Patrick's Athletic Academy	2025	1	0
37	Adam Deans	RB	(Republic of Ireland)	Tallaght, Dublin	21 November 2005 (age 20)	(Republic of Ireland) St Patrick's Athletic Academy	2024	2	0
37	Harry Leonard	RB	(Republic of Ireland)	Dublin	9 September 2008 (age 18)	(Republic of Ireland) St Patrick's Athletic Academy	2025	0	0
39	Sam Steward	CB	(Republic of Ireland)	Tyrrelstown, Dublin	13 February 2008 (age 18)	(Republic of Ireland) St Patrick's Athletic Academy	2024	2	0
Midfielders
6	Jamie Lennon	CDM	(Republic of Ireland)	Santry, Dublin	9 May 1998 (age 28)	(Republic of Ireland) St Patrick's Athletic Academy	2017	257	6
7	Zack Elbouzedi	RW	(Republic of Ireland)	Swords, Dublin	5 April 1998 (age 28)	(Sweden) AIK	2024	49	6
8	Chris Forrester	CM/CAM	(Republic of Ireland)	Smithfield, Dublin	17 December 1992 (age 33)	(Scotland) Aberdeen	2019	420	94
10	Kian Leavy	CAM/LW/RW	(Republic of Ireland)	Ardee, Louth	21 March 2002 (age 24)	(England) Reading	2023	93	6
11	Jason McClelland	LW/CM/LB	(Republic of Ireland)	Templeogue, Dublin	5 March 1997 (age 29)	(Republic of Ireland) UCD	2020	171	11
14	Brandon Kavanagh	CAM/LW/RW	(Republic of Ireland)	Crumlin, Dublin	21 September 2000 (age 26)	(Republic of Ireland) Derry City	2024	82	13
16	Aaron Bolger	CDM/CM	(Republic of Ireland)	Avoca, Wicklow	3 January 2003 (age 23)	(Republic of Ireland) Cork City	2024	29	0
17	Romal Palmer	CM	(England)	Wigan, Greater Manchester	30 September 1998 (age 28)	(Turkey) Göztepe	2024	31	3
19	Barry Baggley	CM/CDM	(Northern Ireland)	Turf Lodge, Belfast	11 January 2002 (age 24)	(England) Fleetwood Town	2025	45	1
20	Jake Mulraney	LW/RW	(Republic of Ireland)	Drimnagh, Dublin	5 April 1996 (age 30)	(United States) Orlando City	2023	123	19
22	Jordon Garrick	LW	(Jamaica)	Jamaica	15 July 1998 (age 28)	(England) Forest Green Rovers	2025	12	1
25	Simon Power	RW/LW	(Republic of Ireland)	Greystones, Wicklow	13 May 1998 (age 28)	(Republic of Ireland) Sligo Rovers	2025	39	4
26	Darren Robinson	CDM/CM	(Northern Ireland)	Portadown, Armagh	29 December 2004 (age 21)	(England) Derby County	2025	11	0
29	Kian Quigley	CM	(Republic of Ireland)	Greystones, Wicklow	29 January 2009 (age 17)	(Republic of Ireland) St Patrick's Athletic Academy	2025	1	0
31	Billy Hayes	LW	(Republic of Ireland)	Clontarf, Dublin	6 June 2008 (age 18)	(Republic of Ireland) St Patrick's Athletic Academy	2024	2	0
38	Jason Folarin Oyenuga	RW	(Republic of Ireland)	Ongar, Dublin	20 November 2005 (age 20)	(Republic of Ireland) St Patrick's Athletic Academy	2023	4	1
38	Jason Spelman	CDM	(Republic of Ireland)	Kilcolgan, Galway	2 April 2009 (age 17)	(Republic of Ireland) St Patrick's Athletic Academy	2025	0	0
45	Matthew O'Hara	CAM/CM	(Republic of Ireland)	Leixlip, Kildare	15 April 2006 (age 20)	(Republic of Ireland) St Patrick's Athletic Academy	2024	7	0
45	Anthony Dodd	CM	(Republic of Ireland)	Killester, Dublin	19 February 2006 (age 20)	(Republic of Ireland) St Patrick's Athletic Academy	2022	4	0
46	Niall Sullivan	CM	(Republic of Ireland)	Dublin	11 February 2009 (age 17)	(Republic of Ireland) St Patrick's Athletic Academy	2025	1	0
47	Sammy Ogungbe	RW	(Republic of Ireland)	Dublin	28 April 2009 (age 17)	(Republic of Ireland) St Patrick's Athletic Academy	2025	1	0
48	Ryan Sheridan	CM	(Republic of Ireland)	Kilcullen, Kildare	31 March 2009 (age 17)	(Republic of Ireland) St Patrick's Athletic Academy	2025	1	0
Forwards
9	Mason Melia	ST/RW	(Republic of Ireland)	Newtownmountkennedy, Wicklow	22 September 2007 (age 19)	(Republic of Ireland) St Patrick's Athletic Academy	2023	98	25
15	Conor Carty	ST	(Republic of Ireland)	Dunlavin, Wicklow	25 May 2002 (age 24)	(England) Bolton Wanderers	2025	78	12
18	Aidan Keena	ST	(Republic of Ireland)	Mullingar, Westmeath	25 April 1999 (age 27)	(England) Cheltenham Town	2024	50	14
35	Sam Rooney	ST	(Republic of Ireland)	Tallaght, Dublin	24 November 2008 (age 17)	(Republic of Ireland) St Patrick's Athletic Academy	2025	1	0

=== Transfers ===
==== Transfers in ====
Date	Position	Nationality	Name	From	Fee	Ref.
11 November 2024	RW	(Republic of Ireland)	Simon Power	(Republic of Ireland) Sligo Rovers	Free transfer	
1 December 2024	CB	(Republic of Ireland)	Sean McHale	(Republic of Ireland) Wexford	Return from loan	
1 December 2024	LB	(Republic of Ireland)	Luke O'Brien	(Republic of Ireland) Finn Harps	Return from loan	
2 December 2024	CM	(England)	Romal Palmer	(Turkey) Göztepe	Free transfer	
3 December 2024	CM	(Northern Ireland)	Barry Baggley	(England) Fleetwood Town	Undisclosed fee	
2 January 2025	CB	(Republic of Ireland)	Seán Hoare	(Republic of Ireland) Shamrock Rovers	Free transfer	
15 January 2025	ST	(Republic of Ireland)	Conor Carty	(England) Bolton Wanderers	Free transfer	
23 February 2025	GK	(Republic of Ireland)	Sean Molloy	(Republic of Ireland) Inchicore Athletic	Free transfer	
1 July 2025	CM	(Republic of Ireland)	Aaron Bolger	(England) Ebbsfleet United	Return from loan	
1 July 2025	CM	(Republic of Ireland)	Anthony Dodd	(Republic of Ireland) Finn Harps	Return from loan	
28 July 2025	CM	(Northern Ireland)	Darren Robinson	(England) Derby County	Loan	
6 August 2025	LW	(Jamaica)	Jordon Garrick	(England) Forest Green Rovers	Free transfer	

==== Transfers out ====
Date	Position	Nationality	Name	To	Fee	Ref.
25 November 2024	LW	(Republic of Ireland)	Alex Nolan	(Republic of Ireland) Cork City	Free transfer	
29 November 2024	ST	(Republic of Ireland)	Cian Kavanagh	(Republic of Ireland) Sligo Rovers	Free transfer	
17 December 2024	CB	(Republic of Ireland)	Conor Keeley	(Republic of Ireland) Drogheda United	Free transfer	
1 January 2025	ST	(Republic of Ireland)	Dare Kareem	(Republic of Ireland) Drogheda United	Free transfer	
3 January 2025	CM	(Republic of Ireland)	Anthony Dodd	(Republic of Ireland) Finn Harps	Loan	
4 January 2025	CM	(Republic of Ireland)	Luke Kehir	(Republic of Ireland) Wexford	Loan	
7 January 2025	CM	(Republic of Ireland)	Rhys Bartley	(Republic of Ireland) Bray Wanderers	Loan	
10 January 2025	CB	(Republic of Ireland)	Sean McHale	(Republic of Ireland) Dundalk	Loan	
15 January 2025	ST	(Republic of Ireland)	Michael Noonan	(Republic of Ireland) Shamrock Rovers	Free transfer	
24 January 2025	LB	(Republic of Ireland)	Luke O'Brien	(Northern Ireland) Carrick Rangers	Free transfer	
4 February 2025	CM	(Republic of Ireland)	Aaron Bolger	(England) Ebbsfleet United	Loan	
4 February 2025 (Note: Transfer agreed on 4 February 2025, but the player will only officially move on 1 January 2026)	ST	(Republic of Ireland)	Mason Melia	(England) Tottenham Hotspur	€2,000,000	
3 July 2025	CM	(Republic of Ireland)	Aaron Bolger	(Republic of Ireland) Galway United	Free transfer	
6 July 2025	RW	(Republic of Ireland)	Jason Folarin Oyenuga	(Republic of Ireland) Athlone Town	Loan	
25 July 2025	GK	(Republic of Ireland)	Matt Boylan	(Republic of Ireland) Treaty United	Free transfer	

=== Squad statistics ===
==== Appearances, goals and cards ====
Number in brackets represents (appearances of which were substituted ON). Last updated – 1 November 2025

No.	Player	SSE Airtricity League		FAI Cup		UEFA Conference League		Leinster Senior Cup		Total	
No.	Player	Apps	Goals	Apps	Goals	Apps	Goals	Apps	Goals	Apps	Goals
1	Danny Rogers	0	0	1	0	0	0	5	0	6	0
2	Seán Hoare	15(3)	0	0	0	0	0	2	0	17(3)	0
3	Anthony Breslin	20(1)	0	1	0	2(2)	0	5(2)	1	28(5)	1
4	Joe Redmond	36	1	3	0	6	1	2(1)	0	47(1)	2
5	Tom Grivosti	21(3)	0	3(1)	0	6(1)	0	4(1)	0	34(6)	0
6	Jamie Lennon	29(1)	1	3	0	6(1)	0	1	0	39(2)	1
7	Zack Elbouzedi	25(3)	3	1	0	3(2)	0	2	0	31(5)	3
8	Chris Forrester	29(7)	5	4	4	6(5)	1	3(1)	1	42(13)	11
9	Mason Melia	35(6)	13	3	1	6(1)	1	0	0	44(7)	15
10	Kian Leavy	27(7)	2	3(1)	0	6(1)	1	2	1	38(9)	4
11	Jason McClelland	31(12)	2	3(1)	0	5	0	3(1)	0	42(14)	2
14	Brandon Kavanagh	28(12)	2	4(1)	1	4(3)	0	5(1)	3	41(17)	6
15	Conor Carty	24(24)	1	3(2)	1	4(3)	1	6(1)	3	37(30)	6
17	Romal Palmer	4(2)	0	0	0	0	0	2(1)	0	6(3)	0
18	Aidan Keena	21(6)	6	1	1	4(4)	1	4(2)	2	30(12)	10
19	Barry Baggley	32(11)	0	2(2)	0	6(1)	0	5(1)	1	45(15)	1
20	Jake Mulraney	31(15)	1	4(2)	2	6(1)	1	6(2)	0	47(20)	4
21	Axel Sjöberg	28(2)	0	3(2)	0	2(1)	0	5(2)	0	38(7)	0
22	Jordon Garrick	7(5)	0	2(1)	1	0	0	3	0	12(6)	1
23	Ryan McLaughlin	18(7)	0	3	0	6	1	3	0	30(7)	1
24	Luke Turner	13(6)	1	2	0	2(1)	0	4	0	21(7)	1
25	Simon Power	28(10)	2	3(1)	0	6(1)	1	2	1	39(12)	4
26	Darren Robinson	8(8)	0	1(1)	0	1	0	1	0	11(9)	0
29	Kian Quigley	0	0	0	0	0	0	1(1)	0	1(1)	0
30	Al-Amin Kazeem	13(7)	0	4(2)	1	3(2)	0	5	0	25(11)	1
31	Billy Hayes	0	0	1(1)	0	0	0	0	0	1(1)	0
32	Billy Canny	0	0	0	0	0	0	0	0	0	0
35	Sam Rooney	0	0	0	0	0	0	1(1)	0	1(1)	0
36	Jonathan Kehir	0	0	0	0	0	0	1(1)	0	1(1)	0
37	Adam Deans	0	0	0	0	0	0	0	0	0	0
37	Harry Leonard	0	0	0	0	0	0	0	0	0	0
38	Jason Spelman	0	0	0	0	0	0	0	0	0	0
39	Sam Steward	0	0	0	0	0	0	1(1)	0	1(1)	0
45	Matty O'Hara	0	0	1	0	0	0	2(2)	0	3(2)	0
46	Niall Sullivan	0	0	0	0	0	0	1(1)	0	1(1)	0
47	Sammy Ogungbe	0	0	0	0	0	0	1(1)	0	1(1)	0
48	Ryan Sheridan	0	0	0	0	0	0	1(1)	0	1(1)	0
49	Sean Molloy	0	0	0	0	0	0	0	0	0	0
94	Joseph Anang	36	0	3	0	6	0	1	0	46	0
Players that left during the season
16	Aaron Bolger	0	0	0	0	0	0	0	0	0	0
29	Matt Boylan	0	0	0	0	0	0	0	0	0	0
38	Jason Folarin Oyenuga	0	0	0	0	0	0	0	0	0	0
45	Anthony Dodd	0	0	0	0	0	0	0	0	0	0

==== Top scorers ====
Includes all competitive matches. Last updated 1 November 2025

Number	Name	SSE Airtricity League	FAI Cup	UEFA Conference League	Leinster Senior Cup	Total
9	Mason Melia	13	1	1	0	15
8	Chris Forrester	5	4	1	1	11
18	Aidan Keena	6	1	1	2	10
15	Conor Carty	1	1	1	3	6
14	Brandon Kavanagh	2	1	0	3	6
25	Simon Power	2	0	1	1	4
10	Kian Leavy	2	0	1	1	4
20	Jake Mulraney	1	2	1	0	4
4	Joe Redmond	2	0	1	0	3
7	Zack Elbouzedi	3	0	0	0	3
11	Jason McClelland	2	0	0	0	2
3	Anthony Breslin	0	0	0	1	1
22	Jordon Garrick	0	1	0	0	1
24	Luke Turner	1	0	0	0	1
23	Ryan McLaughlin	0	0	1	0	1
30	Al-Amin Kazeem	0	1	0	0	1
6	Jamie Lennon	1	0	0	0	1
19	Barry Baggley	0	0	0	1	1
N/A	Own goal	1	0	0	1	2

==== Top assists ====
Includes all competitive matches. Last updated 1 November 2025

Number	Name	SSE Airtricity League	FAI Cup	UEFA Conference League	Leinster Senior Cup	Total
14	Brandon Kavanagh	5	2	0	3	10
11	Jason McClelland	3	0	1	1	5
19	Barry Baggley	4	0	0	1	5
25	Simon Power	3	2	0	0	5
8	Chris Forrester	3	1	0	0	4
9	Mason Melia	3	0	1	0	4
21	Axel Sjöberg	1	3	0	0	4
20	Jake Mulraney	2	0	0	1	3
4	Joe Redmond	1	0	1	0	2
10	Kian Leavy	2	0	0	0	2
18	Aidan Keena	1	1	0	0	2
7	Zack Elbouzedi	2	0	0	0	2
5	Tom Grivosti	1	0	0	0	1
6	Jamie Lennon	1	0	0	0	1
22	Jordon Garrick	1	0	0	0	1
23	Ryan McLaughlin	0	0	1	0	1
31	Billy Hayes	0	1	0	0	1
30	Al-Amin Kazeem	0	1	0	0	1
3	Anthony Breslin	1	0	0	0	1

==== Top clean sheets ====
Includes all competitive matches. Last updated 1 November 2025

Number	Name	SSE Airtricity League	FAI Cup	UEFA Conference League	Leinster Senior Cup	Total
1	Danny Rogers	0/0	1/1	0/0	3/5	4/6
29	Matt Boylan	0/0	0/0	0/0	0/0	0/0
49	Sean Molloy	0/0	0/0	0/0	0/0	0/0
94	Joseph Anang	18/36	1/3	3/6	0/1	22/46

==== Disciplinary record ====
Last updated 1 November 2025

Number	Name	SSE Airtricity League		FAI Cup		UEFA Conference League		Leinster Senior Cup		Total	
Number	Name	Yellow card	Red card	Yellow card	Red card	Yellow card	Red card	Yellow card	Red card	Yellow card	Red card
6	Jamie Lennon	13	0	0	0	0	0	0	0	13	0
5	Tom Grivosti	10	0	0	0	1	0	0	0	11	0
21	Axel Sjöberg	7	1	2	0	0	0	0	0	9	1
19	Barry Baggley	8	1	0	0	0	0	1	0	9	1
20	Jake Mulraney	6	0	0	0	2	0	0	0	8	0
4	Joe Redmond	6	0	0	0	1	0	0	0	7	0
3	Anthony Breslin	4	1	0	0	0	0	1	0	5	1
2	Seán Hoare	6	0	0	0	0	0	0	0	6	0
9	Mason Melia	3	0	1	0	0	0	0	0	4	0
22	Jordon Garrick	1	0	0	0	0	0	1	1	2	1
18	Aidan Keena	1	0	0	0	0	0	1	0	2	0
8	Chris Forrester	1	0	1	0	0	0	0	0	2	0
14	Brandon Kavanagh	2	0	0	0	0	0	0	0	2	0
23	Ryan McLaughlin	1	0	1	0	0	0	0	0	2	0
30	Al-Amin Kazeem	2	0	0	0	0	0	0	0	2	0
11	Jason McClelland	2	0	0	0	0	0	0	0	2	0
94	Joseph Anang	2	0	0	0	0	0	0	0	2	0
17	Romal Palmer	1	0	0	0	0	0	1	0	2	0
24	Luke Turner	0	0	0	0	0	0	0	1	0	1
26	Darren Robinson	1	0	0	0	0	0	0	0	1	0
25	Simon Power	0	0	0	0	1	0	0	0	1	0
7	Zack Elbouzedi	1	0	0	0	0	0	0	0	1	0
Totals		78	3	5	0	5	0	5	2	93	5

==== Captains ====
No.	P	Name	Country	No. games	Notes
4	DF	Joe Redmond	(Republic of Ireland)	46	Captain
1	GK	Danny Rogers	(Republic of Ireland)	4	
8	MF	Chris Forrester	(Republic of Ireland)	2	Vice-captain

Last updated: 1 November 2025
Source: Competitive match reports.
Competitive matches only
Matches started as captain only
Country: FIFA nationality; No.: Squad number; P: Position; Name: Player name; No. Games: Number of games started as captain.

== Club ==
=== Coaching staff ===
- First-team Manager: Stephen Kenny
- Assistant Coach: Brian Gartland
- Assistant Coach: Seán O'Connor
- Goalkeeping coach: Pat Jennings
- Director of Football: Ger O'Brien
- Technical Director: Alan Mathews
- Head of Performance: Graham Byrne
- Assistant Head of Performance: Harry Cornally
- Head of Medical: Sam Rice
- Athletic Therapist: David Mugalu
- Club Doctor: Eoin Godkin
- Masseuse: Christy O'Neill
- Equipment Manager: David McGill
- Head of Academy Football: Ian Bermingham
- Assistant Head of Academy: Jamie Moore
- Lead Academy Player Development Coach: Karl Lambe
- Academy Lead Strength & Conditioning Coach: James McCrudden
- Academy Strength & Conditioning Coach: Brian Hayes
- Head of Academy Goalkeeping: Pat Jennings
- Head of Academy Medical: David Mugalu
- Academy Physio: Christy O'Neill
- Head of Academy Data: Philip Power
- Head of Academy Equipment: Paul Quigley
- Under 20s Head Coach: Thomas Morgan
- Under 20s Assistant Coach: Barry Slattery
- Under 20s Goalkeeping Coach: Jamie Quinn
- Under 17s Head Coach: Alan Brady
- Under 17s Assistant Coach: Ciaran Creagh
- Under 17s Assistant Coach: Kevin Beggy
- Under 17s Goalkeeping Coach: Mick Coakley
- Under 15s Head Coach: Jamie Moore
- Under 15s Assistant Coach: Ian Cully
- Under 15s Goalkeeping Coach: Sean Molloy
- Under 14s Head Coach: Mark Connolly
- Under 14s Assistant Coach: Philip Power
- Under 14s Goalkeeping Coach: Sean Molloy

=== Kit ===
Supplier: Umbro
Sponsor(s): Manguard Plus (Front of Jersey)
Clune Construction Company (Back of Jersey - Bottom)
Bill Griffin Motors (Sleeves of Jersey)
McCarthy Insurance Group (Shorts)

Home	Home Alt	Away	Away Alt	Third	Pre-season Fourth

The club released new Home and Away kits for the season, with the third kit continuing to be used from the previous season.

Type	Shirt	Shorts	Socks	Info
Home	Red/White Sleeves	White	White	Worn 31 times; against Drogheda United (LOI) (H), Sligo Rovers (LOI) (H), Derry City (LOI) (H), Bohemians (LOI) (H), Waterford (LOI) (A), Shelbourne (LOI) (H), Shamrock Rovers (LOI) (H), Galway United (LOI) (H), Cork City (LOI) (H), Waterford (LOI) (H), Drogheda United (LOI) (H), Shelbourne (LOI) (H), Derry City (LOI) (H), Bohemians (LOI) (H), Hegelmann (UCL) (H), Hegelmann (UCL) (A), UCC (FAI) (H), Nõmme Kalju (UCL) (H), Nõmme Kalju (UCL) (A), Waterford (LOI) (A), Beşiktaş (UCL) (N), Sligo Rovers (LOI) (H), Shelbourne (LOI) (H), Drogheda United (LSC) (H), Galway United (FAI) (H), Galway United (LOI) (H), Cork City (LOI) (H), St Mochta's (LSC) (H), Shamrock Rovers (LOI) (H), Waterford (LOI) (H), Dundalk (LSC) (H)
Home Alt	Red/White Sleeves	White	Red	Worn 2 times; against Shamrock Rovers (LOI) (A), Shamrock Rovers (LOI) (A)
Away	Sky Blue	White	Sky Blue	Worn 5 times; against Galway United (LOI) (A), Shelbourne (LOI) (A), Galway United (LOI) (A), Beşiktaş (UCL) (A), Bohemians (LOI) (A)
Away Alt	Sky Blue	Sky Blue	Sky Blue	Worn 2 times; against Bohemians (LOI) (A), Derry City (LOI) (A)
Third	Green	Green	Green	Worn 11 times; against Vancouver Whitecaps (FRN) (N), UCD (FRN) (H), Cork City (LOI) (A), Drogheda United (LOI) (A), Sligo Roverd (LOI) (A), Cork City (LOI) (A), Drogheda United (LOI) (A), Derry City (LOI) (A), Sligo Rovers (LOI) (A), Cork City (FAI) (A), Shelbourne (LOI) (A)
Pre-season Fourth	Yellow	Black	Yellow	Worn 5 times; against Inchicore Athletic (LSC) (A), Bray Wanderers (LSC) (H), Athlone Town (LSC) (A), Molde (FRN) (N), Athlone Town (FRN) (N)

Key:
LOI=League of Ireland Premier Division
FAI=FAI Cup
UCL=UEFA Conference League
PIC=President of Ireland's Cup
LSC=Leinster Senior Cup
FRN=Friendly

== Competitions ==
=== League of Ireland Premier Division ===
==== League table ====
Pos	Team	Pld	W	D	L	GF	GA	GD	Pts	Qualification or relegation
1	Shamrock Rovers (C)	36	19	9	8	56	33	+23	66	Qualification for Champions League first qualifying round
2	Derry City	36	18	9	9	52	39	+13	63	Qualification for Europa League first qualifying round (Note: Shamrock Rovers won the 2025 FAI Cup, meaning the Europa League berth went to the second place team Derry City. The two Conference League berths went to the third and fourth place teams, Shelbourne and Bohemians respectively.)
3	Shelbourne	36	15	14	7	48	37	+11	59	Qualification for Conference League second qualifying round
4	Bohemians	36	16	6	14	48	39	+9	54	Qualification for Conference League first qualifying round
5	St Patrick's Athletic	36	13	13	10	42	32	+10	52	
6	Drogheda United	36	12	15	9	38	38	0	51	
7	Sligo Rovers	36	11	8	17	42	54	−12	41	
8	Galway United	36	9	12	15	37	44	−7	39	
9	Waterford (O)	36	11	6	19	41	60	−19	39	Qualification for promotion/relegation play-off
10	Cork City (R)	36	4	12	20	33	61	−28	24	Relegation to League of Ireland First Division

Source: SSE Airtricity League, Soccerway
Rules for classification: 1) Points; 2) Goal difference; 3) Goals scored.
(C) Champions; (O) Play-off winners; (R) Relegated

==== Results summary ====
Overall								Home						Away					
Pld	W	D	L	GF	GA	GD	Pts	W	D	L	GF	GA	GD	W	D	L	GF	GA	GD
36	13	13	10	42	32	+10	52	8	8	2	28	13	+15	5	5	8	14	19	−5

Last updated: 1 November 2025.

==== Results by round ====
Round	1	2	3	4	5	6	7	8	9	10	11	12	13	14	15	16	17	18	19	20	21	22	23	24	25	26	27	28	29	30	31	32	33	34	35	36
Ground	H	A	H	H	A	H	A	H	A	H	A	A	H	A	A	H	A	H	A	H	H	A	H	A	H	A	H	A	A	H	H	A	H	A	H	A
Result	D	L	W	W	L	W	W	D	W	D	D	L	W	L	L	W	L	D	W	D	L	L	L	D	D	W	W	W	D	D	W	L	W	D	D	D
Position	5	8	6	4	4	2	1	2	2	2	2	3	1	4	5	4	5	5	4	4	4	5	6	6	6	6	6	5	4	4	4	5	6	5	4	5

Updated to match(es) played on 1 November 2025. Source: 2025 League of Ireland Premier Division
A = Away; H = Home; W = Win; D = Draw; L = Loss

==== Matches ====
Win Draw Loss

14 February 2025 1	St Patrick's Athletic	0–0	Drogheda United	Inchicore, Dublin 8
19:45 GMT	Barry Baggley (yellow card) 7'; Romal Palmer (yellow card) 86'	Report	Zishim Bawa (yellow card) 20'; Conor Kane (yellow card) 32'; Ryan Brennan (yellow card) 44'; Shane Farrell (yellow card) 75'; Luke Dennison (yellow card) 80'; Conor Keeley (yellow card) 81'	Stadium: Richmond Park; Attendance: 5,034; Referee: Neil Doyle

21 February 2025 2	Galway United	2–1	St Patrick's Athletic	Galway, County Galway
19:45 GMT	Patrick Hickey 19', 25'; Moses Dyer (yellow card) 72'; Rob Slevin (yellow card) 75'; Max Wilson (yellow card) 87'; Cillian Tollett (yellow card) 87'	Report	Aidan Keena 30'; Ryan McLaughlin (yellow card) 45'	Stadium: Eamonn Deacy Park; Attendance: 4,231; Referee: Damien MacGraith
Note: Live on Virgin Media Two.

28 February 2025 3	St Patrick's Athletic	4–3	Sligo Rovers	Inchicore, Dublin 8
19:45 GMT	Zack Elbouzedi 36'; Aidan Keena 37'; Chris Forrester 52'; Axel Sjöberg (yellow card) 60'; Joe Redmond (yellow card) 65'; Tom Grivosti (yellow card) 71'; Anthony Breslin (yellow card) 72'; Aidan Keena 79'; Barry Baggley (yellow card) 86' (yellow-red card)	Report	Barry Baggley 40' (o.g.); Cian Kavanagh (penalty missed) 56'; John Mahon (yellow card) 60'; Cian Kavanagh 66'; Harvey Lintott (yellow card) 72'; Jad Hakiki (yellow card) 76'; Cian Kavanagh 78'	Stadium: Richmond Park; Attendance: 4,829; Referee: Paul Norton

3 March 2025 4	St Patrick's Athletic	2–0	Derry City	Inchicore, Dublin 8
19:45 GMT	Aidan Keena 16' (pen.); Tom Grivosti (yellow card) 48'; Aidan Keena 67' (pen.)	Report	Mark Connolly (yellow card) 39'; Carl Winchester (red card) 47'; Patrick Hoban (yellow card) 48'; Sadou Diallo (yellow card) 76'; Sean Patton (yellow card) 90+1'	Stadium: Richmond Park; Attendance: 4,884; Referee: Gavin Colfer

7 March 2025 5	Shamrock Rovers	1–0	St Patrick's Athletic	Tallaght, Dublin 24
20:00 GMT	Cory O'Sullivan (yellow card) 34'; Danny Grant 64'; Gary O'Neill (yellow card) 88'; Josh Honohan (yellow card) 88'	Report	Jake Mulraney (yellow card) 21'; Axel Sjöberg (yellow card) 45'	Stadium: Tallaght Stadium; Attendance: 8,093; Referee: Rob Hennessey
Note: Live on Virgin Media Two.

14 March 2025 6	St Patrick's Athletic	3–0	Bohemians	Inchicore, Dublin 8
19:45 GMT	Chris Forrester 17'; Barry Baggley (yellow card) 63'; Mason Melia 83'; Jason McClelland 90'	Report	James Clarke (yellow card) 42'; Dayle Rooney (yellow card) 65'; Jordan Flores (yellow card) 68'	Stadium: Richmond Park; Attendance: 5,338; Referee: Neil Doyle
Note: Live on Virgin Media Two.

28 March 2025 7	Waterford	1–2	St Patrick's Athletic	Waterford, County Waterford
19:45 GMT	Padraig Amond 14'; Dean McMenamy (yellow card) 60'; Grant Horton (yellow card) 87'; Darragh Leahy (yellow card) 89'	Report	Zack Elbouzedi (yellow card) 55'; Barry Baggley (yellow card) 59'; Darragh Leahy 88' (o.g.); Brandon Kavanagh 90'	Stadium: RSC; Attendance: 3,011; Referee: Kevin O'Sullivan

4 April 2025 8	St Patrick's Athletic	0–0	Shelbourne	Inchicore, Dublin 8
19:45 GMT	Jamie Lennon (yellow card) 59'	Report	Mark Coyle (yellow card) 27'; John Martin (yellow card) 28'; Kerr McInroy (yellow card) 83'	Stadium: Richmond Park; Attendance: 5,374; Referee: Rob Hennessey
Note: Live on Virgin Media Two.

11 April 2025 9	Cork City	0–2	St Patrick's Athletic	Turners Cross, County Cork
19:45 GMT	Charlie Lyons (yellow card) 70'; Benny Couto (yellow card) 72'	Report	Seán Hoare (yellow card) 37'; Chris Forrester 42'; Brandon Kavanagh 45+4'; Joseph Anang (yellow card) 81'	Stadium: Turners Cross; Attendance: 3,815; Referee: Marc Lynch

18 April 2025 10	St Patrick's Athletic	2–2	Shamrock Rovers	Inchicore, Dublin 8
19:45 GMT	Jamie Lennon (yellow card) 25'; Mason Melia 32'; Joe Redmond 90+1'	Report	Jack Byrne 37'; Graham Burke (yellow card) 67'; Lee Grace (yellow card) 68'; Lee Grace 88'; Daniel Cleary (yellow card) 90+1'	Stadium: Richmond Park; Attendance: 4,723; Referee: Neil Doyle

21 April 2025 11	Drogheda United	0–0	St Patrick's Athletic	Drogheda, County Louth
17:00 GMT	Warren Davis (yellow card) 45+2'; Ryan Brennan (yellow card) 47'; Darragh Markey (yellow card) 58'; Conor Keeley (yellow card) 71'	Report	Tom Grivosti (yellow card) 49'; Al-Amin Kazeem (yellow card) 61'	Stadium: Sullivan and Lambe Park; Attendance: 2,546; Referee: Kevin O'Sullivan

25 April 2025 12	Bohemians	2–1	St Patrick's Athletic	Phibsborough, Dublin 7
19:45 GMT	Niall Morahan (yellow card) 26'; Rob Cornwall 90'; Seán Grehan 90+7'	Report	Chris Forrester 23' (pen.); Anthony Breslin (yellow card) 41'; Jamie Lennon (yellow card) 70'; Anthony Breslin (yellow card) 90+2' (yellow-red card)	Stadium: Dalymount Park; Attendance: 4,388; Referee: Damien MacGraith

2 May 2025 13	St Patrick's Athletic	2–0	Galway United	Inchicore, Dublin 8
19:45 GMT	Kian Leavy 32'; Zack Elbouzedi 38'; Jamie Lennon (yellow card) 51'; Axel Sjöberg (yellow card) 59'; Axel Sjöberg (yellow card) 69' (yellow-red card); Mason Melia (yellow card) 72'; Joseph Anang (yellow card) 90+4'	Report	Cian Byrne (yellow card) 50'; Sean Kerrigan (yellow card) 58'; Garry Buckley (yellow card) 73'; David Hurley (yellow card) 90+2'	Stadium: Richmond Park; Attendance: 4,709; Referee: Rob Harvey

5 May 2025 14	Derry City	1–0	St Patrick's Athletic	Derry, Northern Ireland
19:45 GMT	Paul McMullan (yellow card) 12'; Shane Ferguson (yellow card) 37'; Danny Mullen (yellow card) 48'	Report	Tom Grivosti (yellow card) 61'; Anthony Breslin (yellow card) 75'; Joe Redmond (yellow card) 90+4'	Stadium: Ryan McBride Brandywell Stadium; Attendance: 4,010; Referee: Damien MacGraith
Note: Live on Virgin Media Two.

9 May 2025 15	Shelbourne	2–1	St Patrick's Athletic	Drumcondra, Dublin 3
19:45 GMT	Tyreke Wilson (yellow card) 22'; Jonathan Lunney (yellow card) 45+2'; Harry Wood 48'; Mark Coyle (yellow card) 51'; Kerr McInroy 90'	Report	Mason Melia 29'; Seán Hoare (yellow card) 53'	Stadium: Tolka Park; Attendance: 5,411; Referee: Kevin O'Sullivan

16 May 2025 16	St Patrick's Athletic	3–2	Cork City	Inchicore, Dublin 8
19:45 GMT	Barry Baggley (yellow card) 10'; Mason Melia 15'; Jake Mulraney (yellow card) 29'; Zack Elbouzedi 89'; Jamie Lennon 90+5'	Report	Josh Fitzpatrick (yellow card) 38'; Charlie Lyons 57'; Sean Maguire 79' (pen.); Sean Maguire (yellow card) 79'; Greg Bolger (yellow card) 79'; Matthew Kiernan (yellow card) 90+5'	Stadium: Richmond Park; Attendance: 4,358; Referee: Paul Norton

19 May 2025 17	Shamrock Rovers	4–0	St Patrick's Athletic	Tallaght, Dublin 24
20:00 GMT	Michael Noonan 22'; Graham Burke 35'; Graham Burke 50'; Aaron Greene 69'	Report	Jamie Lennon (yellow card) 38'; Joe Redmond (yellow card) 60'; Brandon Kavanagh (yellow card) 77'; Seán Hoare (yellow card) 88'	Stadium: Tallaght Stadium; Attendance: 6,542; Referee: Damien MacGraith

23 May 2025 18	St Patrick's Athletic	2–2	Waterford	Inchicore, Dublin 8
19:45 GMT	Mason Melia 28'; Mason Melia 33'; Seán Hoare (yellow card) 38'; Barry Baggley (yellow card) 90+3'	Report	Tommy Lonergan 2'; Rowan McDonald (yellow card) 40'; Darragh Leahy (yellow card) 51'; Conan Noonan 81'; Tommy Lonergan (yellow card) 83'; Ryan Burke (yellow card) 90+6'	Stadium: Richmond Park; Attendance: 4,009; Referee: Rob Hennessey
Note: Live on Virgin Media Two.

30 May 2025 19	Sligo Rovers	0–1	St Patrick's Athletic	Sligo, County Sligo
19:45 GMT	Cian Kavanagh (yellow card) 45+2'	Report	Aidan Keena 10' (pen.); Jason McClelland (yellow card) 86'	Stadium: The Showgrounds; Attendance: 2,356; Referee: Neil Doyle

13 June 2025 20	St Patrick's Athletic	0–0	Drogheda United	Inchicore, Dublin 8
19:45 GMT	Mason Melia (penalty missed) 23'; Jamie Lennon (yellow card) 73'; Jason McClelland (yellow card) 78'		Ryan Brennan (yellow card) 33'; Luke Heeney (yellow card) 53'; Conor Kane (yellow card) 62'; Darragh Markey (yellow card) 90+1'	Stadium: Richmond Park; Attendance: 4,135; Referee: Kevin O'Sullivan

16 June 2025 21	St Patrick's Athletic	0–1	Shelbourne	Inchicore, Dublin 8
19:45 GMT	Joe Redmond (yellow card) 39'; Tom Grivosti (yellow card) 90+2'	Report	Ali Coote 10'; Seán Boyd (yellow card) 35'; Sam Bone (yellow card) 63'; Paddy Barrett (yellow card) 73'; Daniel Kelly (yellow card) 77'; Sean Gannon (yellow card) 90'	Stadium: Richmond Park; Attendance: 4,421; Referee: Paul Norton

20 June 2025 22	Galway United	3–1	St Patrick's Athletic	Galway, County Galway
19:45 GMT	Ed McCarthy 2'; David Hurley 12'; Rob Slevin 35'; Conor McCormack (yellow card) 53'; Moses Dyer (yellow card) 64'; Greg Cunningham (yellow card) 76'; Patrick Hickey (yellow card) 90'	Report	Tom Grivosti (yellow card) 9'; Simon Power 33'; Aidan Keena (yellow card) 56'; Mason Melia (yellow card) 76'	Stadium: Eamonn Deacy Park; Attendance: 2,655; Referee: Rob Harvey

23 June 2025 23	St Patrick's Athletic	0–1	Derry City	Inchicore, Dublin 8
19:45 GMT	Jamie Lennon (yellow card) 21'; Seán Hoare (yellow card) 21'; Joe Redmond (yellow card) 90+2'	Report	Liam Boyce 29'; Ronan Boyce (yellow card) 34'; Liam Boyce (yellow card) 49'; Kevin Holt (yellow card) 51'; Adam O'Reilly (yellow card) 69'; Shane Ferguson (yellow card) 82'; Paul McMullan (yellow card) 86'	Stadium: Richmond Park; Attendance: 3,563; Referee: Mark Houlihan

27 June 2025 24	Cork City	0–0	St Patrick's Athletic	Turners Cross, County Cork
19:45 GMT	Kitt Nelson (yellow card) 25'; Matthew Kiernan (yellow card) 54'; Greg Bolger (yellow card) 63'; Rio Shipston (yellow card) 84'	Report	Seán Hoare (yellow card) 82'; Jake Mulraney (yellow card) 90+4'	Stadium: Turners Cross; Attendance: 2,276; Referee: Marc Lynch
Note: Live on Virgin Media Two.

4 July 2025 25	St Patrick's Athletic	0–0	Bohemians	Inchicore, Dublin 8
19:45 GMT	Jake Mulraney (yellow card) 33'; Jamie Lennon (yellow card) 84'	Report	Dayle Rooney (yellow card) 14'; Rob Cornwall (yellow card) 66'; Dawson Devoy (yellow card) 66'	Stadium: Richmond Park; Attendance: 4,919; Referee: Rob Hennessey
Note: Live on Virgin Media Two.

3 August 2025 26	Waterford	0–2	St Patrick's Athletic	Waterford, County Waterford
16:00 GMT	Stephen McMullan (yellow card) 10'; James Olayinka (yellow card) 65'; Josh Miles (yellow card) 79'; Padraig Amond (yellow card) 80'	Report	Mason Melia 18'; Tom Grivosti (yellow card) 40'; Al-Amin Kazeem (yellow card) 76'; Chris Forrester (yellow card) 80'; Jamie Lennon (yellow card) 80'; Conor Carty 84'; Darren Robinson (yellow card) 90+4'	Stadium: RSC; Attendance: 2,651; Referee: Daniel Murphy
Note: Moved from 1 August due to St Patrick's Athletic's involvement in the UEFA Conference League on 31 July.

10 August 2025 27	St Patrick's Athletic	3–0	Sligo Rovers	Inchicore, Dublin 8
18:00 GMT	Jamie Lennon (yellow card) 20'; Jake Mulraney 49'; Jake Mulraney (yellow card) 49'; Mason Melia 56'; Mason Melia 60'	Report	Patrick McClean (red card) 42'	Stadium: Richmond Park; Attendance: 3,190; Referee: Damien McGraith
Note: Moved from 8 August due to St Patrick's Athletic's involvement in the UEFA Conference League on 7 August.

22 August 2025 28	Drogheda United	0–1	St Patrick's Athletic	Drogheda, County Louth
19:45 GMT	Josh Thomas (yellow card) 66'	Report	Brandon Kavanagh (yellow card) 23'; Luke Turner 90+4'	Stadium: Sullivan and Lambe Park; Attendance: 2,459; Referee: Neil Doyle
Note: Live on Virgin Media Two.

29 August 2025 29	Derry City	2–2	St Patrick's Athletic	Derry, Northern Ireland
19:45 GMT	Adam O'Reilly (yellow card) 8'; Sadou Diallo (yellow card) 57'; Alex Bannon 74'; Alex Bannon 85'; Michael Duffy (yellow card) 90+2'	Report	Mason Melia 40'; Chris Forrester 63'; Axel Sjöberg (yellow card) 87'	Stadium: Ryan McBride Brandywell Stadium; Attendance: 3,050; Referee: Marc Lynch

19 September 2025 30	St Patrick's Athletic	1–1	Galway United	Inchicore, Dublin 8
19:45 GMT	Jason McClelland 72'; Jordon Garrick (yellow card) 73'; Axel Sjöberg (yellow card) 90+2'; Joe Redmond (yellow card) 90+5'	Report	Ed McCarthy (yellow card) 54'; David Hurley 61' (pen.); Rob Slevin (yellow card) 73'; Aaron Bolger (yellow card) 86'; Bobby Burns (yellow card) 89'; David Hurley (red card) 90+5'; Colm Horgan (yellow card) 90+5'	Stadium: Richmond Park; Attendance: 3,500 (Est.); Referee: Rob Harvey
Note: Live on Virgin Media Two.

22 September 2025 31	St Patrick's Athletic	4–0	Cork City	Inchicore, Dublin 8
19:45 GMT	Joe Redmond 7'; Mason Melia 18'; Mason Melia 58'; Kian Leavy 63'; Tom Grivosti (yellow card) 72'	Report	Kaedyn Kamara (yellow card) 21'; Alex Nolan (yellow card) 30'	Stadium: Richmond Park; Attendance: 2,612; Referee: Neil Doyle
Note: Moved from 12 September due to both club's participation in the 2025 FAI Cup Quarter Finals on 12 and 14 of September respectively.

27 September 2025 32	Sligo Rovers	1–0	St Patrick's Athletic	Sligo, County Sligo
19:45 GMT	Jad Hakiki 19'; Will Fitzgerald (yellow card) 28'; Jad Hakiki (yellow card) 37'; Ciaron Harkin (yellow card) 81'; Matty Wolfe (yellow card) 90+2'	Report	Barry Baggley (yellow card) 73'	Stadium: The Showgrounds; Attendance: 2,786; Referee: Kevin O'Sullivan

17 October 2025 33	St Patrick's Athletic	1–0	Shamrock Rovers	Inchicore, Dublin 8
19:45 GMT	Mason Melia (yellow card) 19'; Simon Power 37'; Jamie Lennon (yellow card) 46'; Tom Grivosti (yellow card) 52'	Report	Seán Kavanagh (yellow card) 25'; Graham Burke (yellow card) 30'; Darragh Nugent (yellow card) 34'; Matt Healy (yellow card) 34'; Adam Matthews (yellow card) 79'; Connor Malley (yellow card) 87'	Stadium: Richmond Park; Attendance: 4,500 (Est.); Referee: Neil Doyle

20 October 2025 34	Bohemians	0–0	St Patrick's Athletic	Phibsborough, Dublin 7
19:45 GMT	Cia Byrne (yellow card) 37'; Leigh Kavanagh (yellow card) 37'; James Clarke (yellow card) 65'	Report	Axel Sjöberg (yellow card) 37'; Jamie Lennon (yellow card) 37'	Stadium: Dalymount Park; Attendance: 4,391; Referee: Paul McLaughlin
Note: Moved from 3 October due to St Patrick's Athletic's participation in the 2025 FAI Cup Semi Final 3 October.

24 October 2025 35	St Patrick's Athletic	1–1	Waterford	Inchicore, Dublin 8
19:45 GMT	Tom Grivosti (yellow card) 38'; Mason Melia 40'	Report	Navajo Bakboord (yellow card) 33'; Ryan Burke 45+2'; Darragh Leahy (yellow card) 73'; Matty Smith (yellow card) 82'; Kacper Radkowski (yellow card) 85'	Stadium: Richmond Park; Attendance: 4,118; Referee: Paul Norton

1 November 2025 36	Shelbourne	0–0	St Patrick's Athletic	Drumcondra, Dublin 3
16:30 GMT	James Norris (yellow card) 17'; Milan Mbeng (yellow card) 45+3'; Mark Coyle (yellow card) 89'	Report	Jamie Lennon (yellow card) 26'	Stadium: Tolka Park; Attendance: 5,417; Referee: Rob Harvey

=== FAI Cup ===
Win Draw Loss

==== Second Round ====
20 July 2025 Second Round	St Patrick's Athletic	8–0	UCC	Inchicore, Dublin 8
18:00	Colm Murphy 19' (o.g.); Brandon Kavanagh 40'; Aidan Keena 43'; Chris Forrester 45+1'; Al-Amin Kazeem 46'; Jake Mulraney 49'; Conor Carty 51'; Axel Sjöberg (yellow card) 65'; Chris Forrester 68'	Report	Matthew Broderick (yellow card) 25'; Michael Fahy (yellow card) 40'; Jonathan Connolly (yellow card) 64'; Ben Loughery (yellow card) 70'	Stadium: Richmond Park; Attendance: 1,243; Referee: Alan Patchell

==== Third Round ====
17 August 2025 Third Round	St Patrick's Athletic	2–0	Shelbourne	Inchicore, Dublin 8
17:00	Mason Melia 45+2'; Chris Forrester 53' (pen.); Ryan McLaughlin (yellow card) 64'	Report	Kerr McInroy (yellow card) 50'; Sean Gannon (yellow card) 85'	Stadium: Richmond Park; Attendance: 3,003; Referee: Paul McLaughlin

==== Quarter Final ====
14 September 2025 Quarter Final	St Patrick's Athletic	3–1 (a.e.t.)	Galway United	Inchicore, Dublin 8
18:00	Chris Forrester (yellow card) 32'; Mason Melia (yellow card) 44'; Jake Mulraney 83'; Axel Sjöberg (yellow card) 89'; Chris Forrester 105+1'; Jordon Garrick 115'	Report	Aaron Bolger (yellow card) 33'; David Hurley 90'; Conor McCormack (yellow card) 95'; Jeremy Sivi (yellow card) 96'; Vincent Borden (yellow card) 104'; Killian Brouder (red card) 105'	Stadium: Richmond Park; Attendance: 4,000 (Est.); Referee: Paul McLaughlin
Note: Live on RTÉ Two.

==== Semi Final ====
3 October 2025 Quarter Final	Cork City	3–0	St Patrick's Athletic	Turners Cross, County Cork
19:30	Sean Maguire 9'; Freddie Anderson (yellow card) 42'; Evan McLaughlin 70'; Evan McLaughlin 72'; Charlie Lyons (yellow card) 73'	Report		Stadium: Turners Cross; Attendance: 5,408; Referee: Rob Harvey
Note: Live on RTÉ Two.

=== UEFA Conference League ===
Win Draw Loss

==== First Qualifying Round ====
10 July 2025 1st leg	St Patrick's Athletic (Republic of Ireland)	1–0	(Lithuania) Hegelmann	Dublin, Republic of Ireland
19:45	Aidan Keena 81' (pen.)	Report	Nikola Đorić (yellow card) 52'; Vilius Armalas (yellow card) 65'	Stadium: Richmond Park; Attendance: 2,184; Referee: Simon Bourdeaud'hui (Belgium)
Note: Capacity of Richmond Park reduced due to UEFA regulations on standing areas not being used during UEFA Conference League matches.

17 July 2025 2nd leg	Hegelmann (Lithuania)	0–2 (0–3 agg.)	(Republic of Ireland) St Patrick's Athletic	Kaunas, Lithuania
19:00 (local time)	Lazar Kojić (yellow card) 45'; Donatas Kazlauskas (yellow card) 51'; Klaudijus Upstas (yellow card) 67'; Esmilis Kaušinis (yellow card) 82'	Report	Mason Melia 6'; Kian Leavy 56'	Stadium: Raudondvaris Stadium; Attendance: 1,550; Referee: Mads Kristoffersen (Denmark)

==== Second Qualifying Round ====
24 July 2025 1st leg	St Patrick's Athletic (Republic of Ireland)	1–0	(Estonia) Nõmme Kalju	Dublin, Republic of Ireland
19:45	Jake Mulraney (yellow card) 45'; Chris Forrester 90'	Report	Danyl Mashchenko (yellow card) 23'; Ivans Patrikejevs (yellow card) 36'; Oleksandr Musolitin (yellow card) 39'; Rommi Siht (yellow card) 55'; Rommi Siht (yellow card) 64' (yellow-red card); Danyl Mashchenko (yellow card) 69' (yellow-red card)	Stadium: Richmond Park; Attendance: 2,330; Referee: Ladislav Szikszay (Czech Republic)
Note: Capacity of Richmond Park reduced due to UEFA regulations on standing areas not being used during UEFA Conference League matches.

31 July 2025 2nd leg	Nõmme Kalju (Estonia)	2–2 (a.e.t.) (2–3 agg.)	(Republic of Ireland) St Patrick's Athletic	Tallinn, Estonia
19:45 (local time)	Nikita Ivanov (yellow card) 21'; Kristjan Kask (yellow card) 25'; Ivans Patrikejevs 43'; Mattias Männilaan 49'; Ivans Patrikejevs (yellow card) 90'	Report	Joe Redmond (yellow card) 35'; Joe Redmond 90+1'; Jake Mulraney 93'; Simon Power (yellow card) 106'	Stadium: Lilleküla Stadium; Attendance: 2,866; Referee: Menelaos Antoniou (Cyprus)

==== Third Qualifying Round ====
7 August 2025 1st leg	St Patrick's Athletic (Republic of Ireland)	1–4	(Turkey) Beşiktas	Dublin, Republic of Ireland
19:45	Jake Mulraney (yellow card) 19'; Simon Power 49'	Report	João Mário 8'; Tammy Abraham 14'; Tammy Abraham 23'; Demir Ege Tıknaz (yellow card) 33'; Tammy Abraham 43' (pen.)	Stadium: Tallaght Stadium; Attendance: 7,821; Referee: David Šmajc (Slovenia)
Note: Moved from St Patrick's Athletic's Richmond Park home ground due to UEFA regulations.

14 August 2025 2nd leg	Beşiktaş (Turkey)	3–2 (7–3 agg.)	(Republic of Ireland) St Patrick's Athletic	Istanbul, Turkey
21:00 (local time)	Demir Ege Tıknaz 43'; Tammy Abraham 49'; João Mário 79'; Mert Günok (yellow card) 90+4'	Report	Conor Carty 3' (pen.); Ryan McLaughlin 34'; Tom Grivosti (yellow card) 87'	Stadium: Beşiktaş Stadium; Attendance: 20,456; Referee: António Nobre (Portugal)

=== Leinster Senior Cup ===
Win Draw Loss

==== Round 3 - Group C ====
Team	Pld	W	D	L	GF	GA	GD	Pts
St Patrick's Athletic	3	2	1	0	7	4	3	7
Athlone Town	3	1	2	0	8	5	3	5
Bray Wanderers	2	0	1	1	2	3	–1	1
Inchicore Athletic	2	0	0	2	1	6	–5	0

18 January 2025 Match 1	Inchicore Athletic	0–2	St Patrick's Athletic	Clondalkin, Dublin 22
14:00 GMT		Report	Simon Power 45+1'; Aidan Keena 61'	Stadium: Capco Park; Attendance: 572; Referee: Gavin Colfer

21 January 2025 Match 3	St Patrick's Athletic	2–1	Bray Wanderers	Inchicore, Dublin 8
19:45 GMT	Kian Leavy 32'; Barry Baggley 36'; Luke Turner (red card) 42'	Report	Cian Curtis (penalty missed) 42'; Paul Murphy 44'; Killian Cantwell (yellow card) 68'; Max Murphy (yellow card) 69'	Stadium: Richmond Park; Attendance: 900 (Est.); Referee: Rob Harvey

24 January 2025 Match 3	Athlone Town	3–3	St Patrick's Athletic	Athlone, County Westmeath
19:30 GMT	Dean Williams 24'; Dean Williams 56' (pen.); Ben Feeney 80'	Report	Brandon Kavanagh 8'; Brandon Kavanagh 33'; Romal Palmer (yellow card) 56'; Brandon Kavanagh 57'; Anthony Breslin (yellow card) 79'	Stadium: Athlone Town Stadium; Attendance: 0 (Behind closed doors); Referee: Aaron O'Dowd
Note: Behind closed doors due to Storm Éowyn

==== Quarter Final ====
5 September 2025 Quarter Final	St Patrick's Athletic	2–0	Drogheda United	Inchicore, Dublin 8
19:00	Conor Carty 14'; Conor Carty 60'; Barry Baggley (yellow card) 88'	Report	Paul Doyle (yellow card) 31'; Shane Farrell (yellow card) 53'; George Cooper (yellow card) 55'; Kieran Cruise (yellow card) 90+2'	Stadium: Richmond Park; Attendance: 950 (Est.); Referee: Mark Houlihan

==== Semi Final ====
10 October 2025 Semi Final	St Patrick's Athletic	4–0	St Mochta's	Inchicore, Dublin 8
19:00	Chris Forrester 18'; Anthony Breslin 41'; Michael Scott 66' (o.g.); Conor Carty 76'	Report	Calvin Douglas (yellow card) 67'	Stadium: Richmond Park; Attendance: 950 (Est.); Referee: Daniel Murphy

==== Final ====
26 October 2025 Final	St Patrick's Athletic	1–2	Dundalk	Inchicore, Dublin 8
18:00	Aidan Keena 27'; Jordon Garrick (yellow card) 58'; Jordon Garrick (red card) 58'; Aidan Keena (yellow card) 85'	Report	Harry Groome 5'; Rohan Vaughan 11'; Keith Ward (penalty missed) 51'; Norman Garbett (yellow card) 58'; Tom McLaughlin (yellow card) 63'; Harry Groome (yellow card) 87'; Ronan Murray (yellow card) 90+7'	Stadium: Richmond Park; Attendance: 600 (Est.); Referee: Oliver Moran

=== Friendlies ===
Win Draw Loss

==== Pre-season ====
29 January 2025	Vancouver Whitecaps (Canada)	1–1	(Republic of Ireland) St Patrick's Athletic	Marbella, Spain
13:00 GMT	Tate Johnson (yellow card) 45+1'; Damir Kreilach 90+2' (pen.)		Aidan Keena 8'	Stadium: Marbella Football Centre; Attendance: 50 (Est.)

1 February 2025	Molde (Norway)	1–2	(Republic of Ireland) St Patrick's Athletic	Estepona, Spain
10:30 GMT	Frederik Ihler 40'		Jason McClelland 3'; Jake Mulraney 65'	Stadium: Estepona Football Centre; Attendance: 30 (Est.)

7 February 2025	St Patrick's Athletic	4–0	UCD	Inchicore, Dublin 8
19:45 GMT	Seán Hoare 28'; Aidan Keena 44'; Brandon Kavanagh 54'; Romal Palmer 57'			Stadium: Richmond Park; Attendance: 800 (Est.); Referee: Oliver Moran

8 February 2025	St Patrick's Athletic	3–1	Athlone Town	Blanchardstown, Dublin 15
13:00 GMT	Matty O'Hara 11'; Billy Hayes 47'; Tom Grivosti 72'; Jason McClelland (penalty missed) 87'		Kyle Robinson 66'; Aaron Connolly (yellow card) 88'	Stadium: FAI National Training Centre; Attendance: 50 (Est.); Referee: Robert Dowling
