= Jason McClelland =

Irish footballer (born 1997)

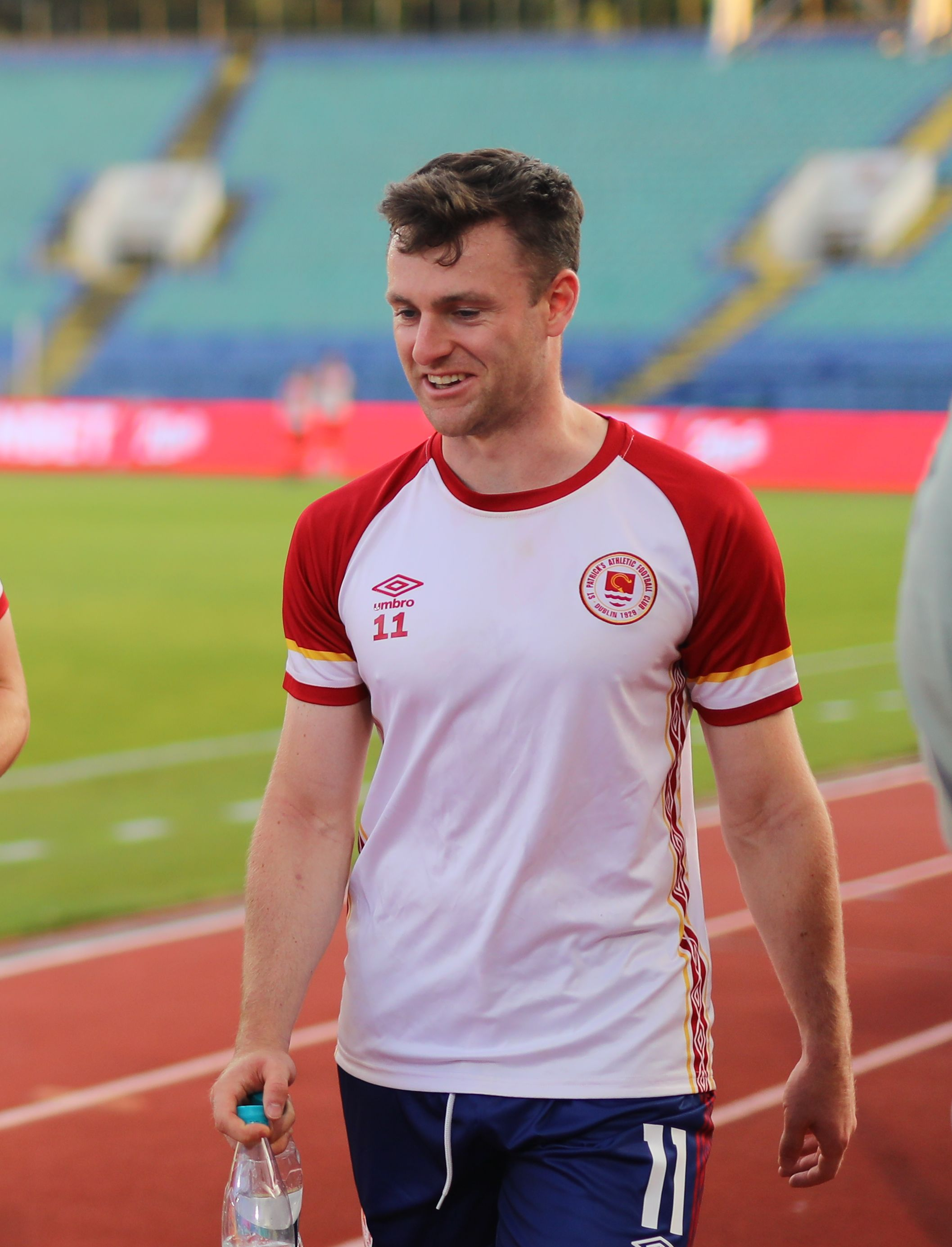
- McClelland with St Patrick's Athletic in 2022.

Personal information
- Date of birth: 5 March 1997 (age 29)
- Place of birth: Dublin, Ireland
- Positions: Winger; midfielder; left back

Team information
- Current team: St Patrick's Athletic
- Number: 11

Youth career
- Shamrock Rovers
- Templeogue United
- Peamount United
- Crumlin United
- 2014–2015: Shamrock Rovers
- 2015–2016: UCD

Senior career*
Years	Team	Apps	(Gls)
2015	Shamrock Rovers	0	(0)
2015–2019	UCD	106	(20)
2020–	St Patrick's Athletic	161	(11)

International career
2015	Republic of Ireland U19	2	(0)
- * Club domestic league appearances and goals as of 23:36, 30 October 2026 (UTC)

Jason McClelland (born 5 March 1997) is an Irish professional footballer who plays for League of Ireland Premier Division club, St Patrick's Athletic, having previously played for UCD for 5 seasons.

== Club career ==
=== Early career ===
McClelland started off playing football with Shamrock Rovers at an early age. He moved on to Templeogue United and also enjoyed spells at Peamount United & Crumlin United before returning to Shamrock Rovers where he played with their Under 19's side in the 2014–15 season. He made his first senior appearance on 28 April 2015 when he came off the bench for the final 5 minutes of a 3–1 win away to Athlone Town in the Leinster Senior Cup. That proved to be his only senior appearance for Rovers as he moved on to UCD in July 2015, playing for their Under 19's side.

=== UCD ===
McClelland made his first senior appearance for UCD on 19 July 2015 in a friendly against Liverpool at the UCD Bowl. With the UCD first team fatigued following their UEFA Europa League campaign, it allowed McClelland a chance to make his first career senior appearance in a league game on 31 July 2015 when he came off the bench in a 3–0 win away to Cabinteely. He was an unused substitute in 7 other first team games that season as he continued to play with the under 19's. The 2016 season was McClelland's first season as a full first team player. His first career goal came on 3 June 2016 when he scored a 64th-minute goal in a 2–0 win at home to Shelbourne. He would again be the enemy of Shelbourne the following month when he scored an 84th-minute winner in a 2–1 win for UCD at Tolka Park. His final goal of the season came on 30 September 2016 when he scored in an 8–1 demolition of Waterford at the RSC. He finished the season with 20 appearances and 3 goals. The 2017 season saw UCD finish in third place in the league, with McClelland appearing 28 times in all competitions, scoring 7 goals. He was part of the side that won the Collingwood Cup, beating QUB in the final in February 2018. On 7 May 2018, he scored his first career hat-trick as his side thumped Wexford 8–0 at Ferrycarrig Park. On 28 September 2018, he played the full 90 minutes away to League of Ireland Premier Division Champions Dundalk in the FAI Cup Semi Finals as his side were denied a place in the Aviva Stadium by a narrow 1–0 scoreline. That was the club's final game of the season in a year which saw McClelland score 10 goals in 32 appearances in all competitions and also receive the first silverware of his career as his side gained promotion by winning the 2018 League of Ireland First Division. 2019 saw McClelland's first taste of League of Ireland Premier Division action. On 5 July he scored the winner in a crucial 1–0 victory over relegation fighting rivals Finn Harps. The season proved to be a difficult one for UCD as they finished bottom of the league and were relegated back to the First Division. The season did however provide a lot of experience at top tier level for McClelland, as he made 42 appearances in all competitions, scoring 4 goals.

=== St Patrick's Athletic ===
==== 2020 season ====
On 8 November 2019 it was announced that McClelland had signed for St Patrick's Athletic, becoming manager Stephen O'Donnell's first ever signing for the club. Upon signing, he spoke of his excitement at signing his first professional contract and his ambitions for the season ahead being to help the club get back to UEFA Europa League qualification. He made his competitive debut on 14 February 2020, making the starting eleven as his side lost 1–0 against Waterford in the opening game of the season at Richmond Park. He played in 16 of the club's 19 league and cup games over the course of the shortened season due to the Coronavirus pandemic, as his side missed out on European football on the final day of the season, finishing in 6th place.

==== 2021 season ====
McClelland's first goal for the club came on 2 July 2021, scoring from 25 yards in a 3–2 loss to Bohemians at Dalymount Park with his side down to 9 men at the time. His first home goal at Richmond Park for the club came in a 6–0 win over Bray Wanderers in the FAI Cup on 23 July 2021, scoring a diving header to give his side a 2-goal lead going into half-time. On 1 November 2021, McClelland scored his first home league goal for the club when he finished a Jak Hickman cross from 5 yards to double his side's lead in the Dublin City derby against Bohemians on 1 November 2021. On 28 November 2021 McClelland scored his penalty in the 2021 FAI Cup Final penalty shootout, as his side defeated rivals Bohemians 4–3 on penalties following a 1–1 draw after extra time in front of a record FAI Cup Final crowd of 37,126 at the Aviva Stadium.

==== 2022 season ====
On 18 December 2021, McClelland signed a new contract with the club for the 2022 season. On 11 February 2022, he made came off the bench in the 2022 President of Ireland's Cup against Shamrock Rovers at Tallaght Stadium, as his side lost 5–4 on penalties after a 1–1 draw. On 18 February 2022, he scored his side's third goal in a 3–0 win away to Shelbourne in the first league game of the season.

==== 2023 season ====
On 12 November 2023, McClelland came off the bench in the 2023 FAI Cup Final, in a 3–1 win over Bohemians in front of a record breaking FAI Cup Final crowd of 43,881 at the Aviva Stadium. On 27 November 2023, it was announced that McClelland has signed a contract extension with Pats, taking him into a 5th season with the club.

==== 2024 season ====
On 11 August 2024, he scored his first goal of the 2024 season, opening the scoring in a 1–1 draw away to Galway United with a 25-yard drive into the bottom right corner off the inside of the post. On 8 October 2024, McClelland was part of the Pats side that defeated St Mochta's 2–1 in the final of the 2023–24 Leinster Senior Cup. On 4 December 2024, McClelland signed a new contract with the club, taking him into his 6th season there.

==== 2025 season ====
McClelland scored his first goal of the 2025 season on 14 March 2025, scoring the final goal of the game in the 90th minute of a 3–0 win over Bohemians at Richmond Park, having replaced Jake Mulraney from the bench 23 minutes earlier. On 7 August 2025, he provided the assist for Simon Power's consolation goal in a defeat to Turkish giants Beşiktaş in the UEFA Conference League. On 19 September 2025, McClelland scored the equaliser for his side in a 1–1 draw at home to Galway United. On 8 December 2025, it was announced that McClelland had signed a new multi-year contract with the club.

==== 2026 season ====
On 27 April 2026, he scored his first goal of the 2026 season, finding the bottom right corner from 30 yards in a 5–0 win over Blackrock College in the Leinster Senior Cup. On 17 July 2026, he opened the scoring in the 14th minute of a 2–1 win at home to Wexford in the FAI Cup. On 11 September 2026, he opened the scoring in the 4th minute of a 2–0 victory over Shamrock Rovers by meeting a Jamie Lennon cross on the volley via the underside of the crossbar.

== International career ==
McClelland received his first cap at international level on 15 November 2015 in a friendly for Republic of Ireland U19 against Latvia U19. His first competitive appearance came 3 days later when he played against Scotland U19 in a UEFA European Under-19 Championship qualifier.

== Personal life ==
McClelland studied at University College Dublin while playing for them, graduating with a Bachelor of Arts in Geography and Economics.

== Career statistics ==
As of match played 30 October 2026

Appearances and goals by club, season and competition
Club	Season	League			National Cup		League Cup		Europe		Other		Total	
Club	Season	Division	Apps	Goals	Apps	Goals	Apps	Goals	Apps	Goals	Apps	Goals	Apps	Goals
Shamrock Rovers	2015	LOI Premier Division	0	0	0	0	0	0	—		1 (Note: Appearances in Leinster Senior Cup)	0	1	0
UCD	2015	LOI First Division	1	0	0	0	0	0	0 (Note: Appearances in UEFA Europa League)	0	—		1	0
UCD	2016	LOI First Division	18	3	2	0	0	0	—		0	0	20	3
UCD	2017	LOI First Division	26	7	0	0	0	0	—		2	0	28	7
UCD	2018	LOI First Division	26	8	4	2	1	0	—		1	0	32	10
UCD	2019	LOI Premier Division	35	2	3	1	2	0	—		2	1	42	4
UCD	Total		106	20	9	3	3	0	—		5	1	123	24
St Patrick's Athletic	2020	LOI Premier Division	15	0	1	0	—		—		—		16	0
St Patrick's Athletic	2021	LOI Premier Division	24	2	4	1	—		—		—		28	3
St Patrick's Athletic	2022	LOI Premier Division	20	1	0	0	—		1 (Note: Appearances in UEFA Europa Conference League)	0	1 (Note: Appearance in the President of Ireland's Cup)	0	22	1
St Patrick's Athletic	2023	LOI Premier Division	23	4	5	0	—		1	0	1	0	30	4
St Patrick's Athletic	2024	LOI Premier Division	21	1	1	0	—		5 (Note: Appearances in UEFA Conference League)	0	6 (Note: 1 appearance in the President of Ireland's Cup & 5 appearances in the Leinster Senior Cup)	0	33	1
St Patrick's Athletic	2025	LOI Premier Division	31	2	3	0	—		5	0	3	0	42	2
St Patrick's Athletic	2026	LOI Premier Division	27	1	3	1	—		—		2	1	32	3
St Patrick's Athletic	Total		161	11	17	2	—		12	0	13	1	203	14
Career Total			267	31	26	5	3	0	12	0	18	2	327	38

== Honours ==
UCD

- League of Ireland First Division (1): 2018
- Collingwood Cup (1): 2018

St Patrick's Athletic

- FAI Cup (2): 2021, 2023
- Leinster Senior Cup (1): 2023–24
