= Axel Sjöberg (footballer, born 2000) =

Swedish footballer (born 2000)

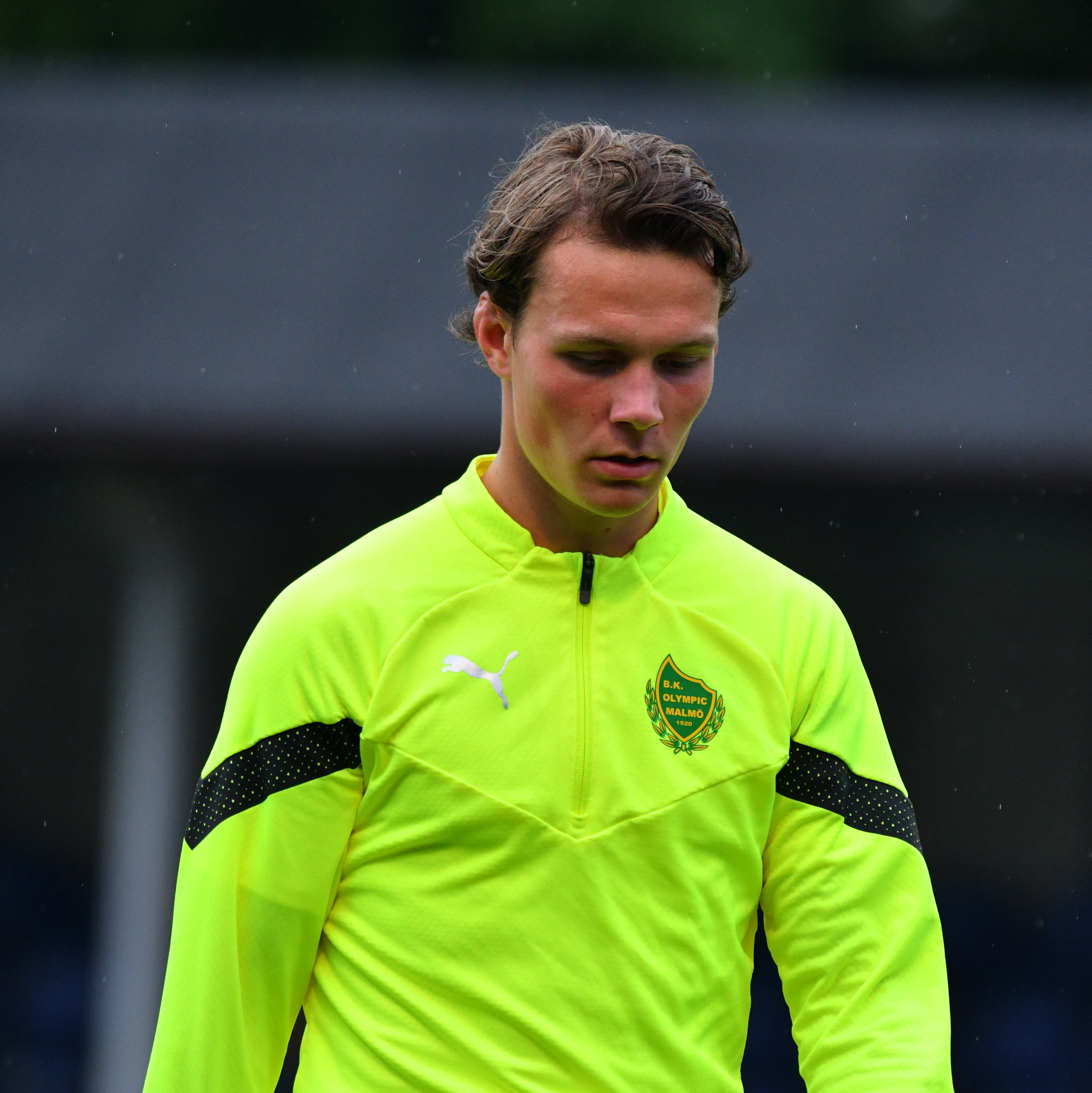
- Sjöberg with BK Olympic in 2022

Personal information
- Full name: Carl Axel Sjöberg
- Date of birth: 12 April 2000 (age 26)
- Place of birth: Helsingborg, Sweden
- Position: Right-back

Team information
- Current team: Eskilsminne

Youth career
- –2013: Eskilsminne IF
- 2013–2019: Helsingborgs IF

Senior career*
Years	Team	Apps	(Gls)
2019–2020	IK Frej	10	(0)
2020–2021	Hammarby IF	3	(0)
2020	→ IK Frej (loan)	17	(0)
2021	Hammarby TFF	7	(0)
2021	→ IK Brage (loan)	9	(1)
2022	BK Olympic	24	(2)
2023–2025	St Patrick's Athletic	53	(0)
2026–	Eskilsminne	26	(2)
- * Club domestic league appearances and goals as of 10 November 2026

Carl Axel Sjöberg (born 14 April 2000), known as Axel Sjöberg, is a Swedish professional footballer who plays as a right-back for Eskilsminne.

== Early life ==
Sjöberg was born in Helsingborg, Sweden, and started to play football as a youngster with local club Eskilsminne IF before moving to Helsingborgs IF in 2013. He was part of their youth academy for seven years, but left the club in 2019 after not being offered a professional contract.

== Career ==
=== IK Frej ===
On 19 July 2019, Sjöberg joined IK Frej in Superettan, on a one-and-a-half-year contract. He only made one league appearance during the second half of the season, as the club got relegated from Sweden's second division.

In 2020, Sjöberg made 26 league appearances and captained IK Frej as the club finished 9th in Division 1, the third tier.

=== Hammarby IF ===
On 5 August 2020, Sjöberg signed a one-and-a-half-year contract with Hammarby IF, although still being eligible to play for affiliated club IK Frej. He made his Allsvenskan debut on 30 August in a 3–3 home draw against Kalmar FF.

On 30 May 2021, Sjöberg won the 2020–21 Svenska Cupen, the main domestic cup, with Hammarby IF, through a 5–4 win on penalties (0–0 after full-time) against BK Häcken in the final.

On 4 August 2021, Sjöberg was sent out on loan to IK Brage in Superettan for the remainder of the year. At the end of the year, it was announced that Sjöberg would leave Hammarby IF at the expiration of his contract.

=== BK Olympic ===
Sjöberg spent 2022 at BK Olympic, scoring 2 goals in 25 appearances in all competitions during his time with the club.

=== St Patrick's Athletic ===
On 3 March 2023, Sjöberg signed for League of Ireland Premier Division club St Patrick's Athletic. He made his debut for the club on 31 March 2023, replacing Sam Curtis from the bench in the 82nd minute of a 3–0 home win over UCD. On 26 May 2023, Sjöberg picked up an injury in a 2–1 win over Dundalk that would keep him out of action for several months, missing his club's UEFA Europa Conference League campaign in the process. He made his return from injury on 22 September 2023 against the same opposition, but was forced off injured in the 22nd minute due to a recurrence of his hamstring injury, with the injury ending his season prematurely meaning he missed out on featuring in the 2023 FAI Cup Final which his side won 3–1 against Bohemians in front of 43,881 fans at the Aviva Stadium. On 6 December 2023, he signed a new contract with the club. On 25 July 2024, Sjöberg made his first European appearance of his career, in a 3–1 win at home to Vaduz of Liechtenstein in the UEFA Conference League. He featured in two 1–0 wins at home and away against Sabah of Azerbaijan, before making his 100th career appearance on 22 August 2024 in a 0–0 draw at home to Turkish club İstanbul Başakşehir in the UEFA Conference League Play-off Round. On 22 November 2024, Sjöberg signed a contract extension, taking him into his third season with the club. On 20 July 2025, he provided 3 assists in the same game, setting up an own goal, then one each for Brandon Kavanagh and Al-Amin Kazeem in an 8–0 win at home to UCC in the FAI Cup. He made a total of 71 appearances during his 3 seasons at the club, before being released at the end of his contract in November 2025.

=== Eskilsminne ===
In February 2026, Sjöberg returned to Sweden, signing for Ettan side Eskilsminne.

== Personal life ==
His twin brother Filip Sjöberg is also a professional footballer.

== Career statistics ==
As of match played on 31 October 2026

Appearances and goals by club, season and competition
Club	Season	League			National cup (Note: Includes Svenska Cupen & FAI Cup)		Europe		Other		Total	
Club	Season	Division	Apps	Goals	Apps	Goals	Apps	Goals	Apps	Goals	Apps	Goals
IK Frej	2019	Superettan	1	0	1	0	—		—		2	0
IK Frej	2020	Ettan	26	0	0	0	—		—		26	0
IK Frej	Total		27	0	1	0	—		—		28	0
Hammarby IF	2020	Allsvenskan	1	0	1	0	0	0	—		2	0
Hammarby IF	2021	Allsvenskan	2	0	2	0	0	0	—		4	0
Hammarby IF	Total		3	0	3	0	0	0	—		6	0
Hammarby TFF (loan)	2021	Ettan	7	0	0	0	—		—		7	0
IK Brage (loan)	2021	Superettan	9	0	1	0	—		—		10	0
BK Olympic	2022	Ettan	24	2	1	0	—		—		25	2
St Patrick's Athletic	2023	LOI Premier Division	7	0	0	0	0	0	—		7	0
St Patrick's Athletic	2024	LOI Premier Division	18	0	1	0	6 (Note: Appearances in the UEFA Conference League)	0	1 (Note: Appearance in the President of Ireland's Cup)	0	26	0
St Patrick's Athletic	2025	LOI Premier Division	28	0	3	0	2	0	5 (Note: Appearances in the Leinster Senior Cup)	0	38	0
St Patrick's Athletic	Total		53	0	4	0	8	0	6	0	71	0
Eskilsminne	2026	Ettan	25	2	2	0	—		—		27	2
Career total			148	4	12	0	8	0	6	0	174	4

== Honours ==
Hammarby IF

- Svenska Cupen: 2020–21

St Patrick's Athletic

- FAI Cup: 2023
- Leinster Senior Cup: 2023–24
