= Jake Mulraney =

Irish footballer

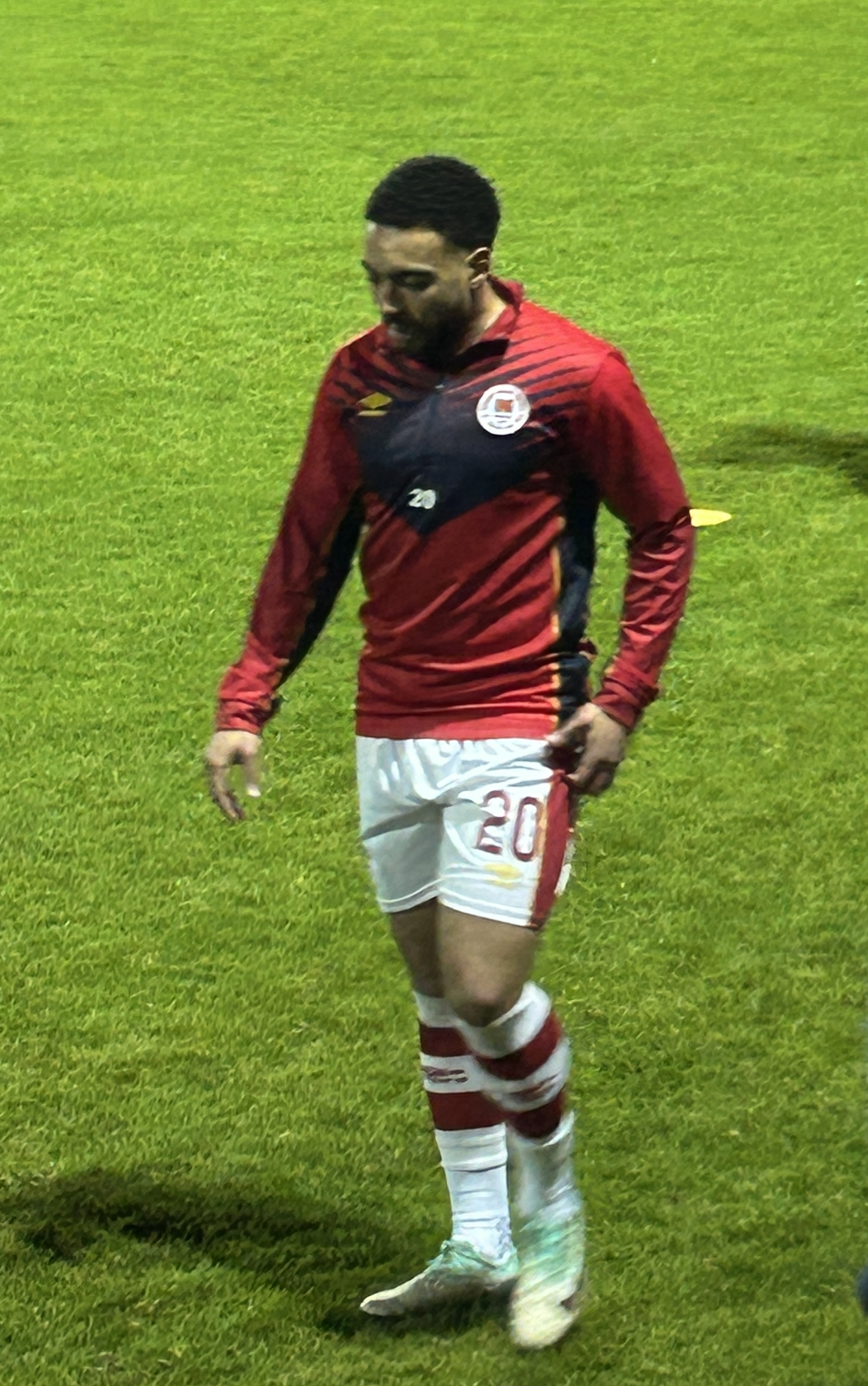
- Mulraney with St Patrick's Athletic in 2024

Personal information
- Full name: Jake David Mulraney
- Date of birth: 5 April 1996 (age 30)
- Place of birth: Dublin, Ireland
- Height: 1.72 m (5 ft 8 in)
- Position: Midfielder

Team information
- Current team: Shamrock Rovers
- Number: 11

Youth career
- St John Bosco
- Lourdes Celtic
- 2003–2012: Crumlin United
- 2012–2014: Nottingham Forest
- 2014: Ilkeston

Senior career*
Years	Team	Apps	(Gls)
2014	Ilkeston	2	(0)
2014–2016	Queens Park Rangers	0	(0)
2015	→ Dagenham & Redbridge (loan)	6	(0)
2016	→ Stevenage (loan)	6	(1)
2016–2018	Inverness Caledonian Thistle	52	(2)
2018–2020	Heart of Midlothian	38	(2)
2020–2022	Atlanta United	47	(3)
2022	Orlando City	17	(0)
2022	Orlando City B	1	(0)
2023–2026	St Patrick's Athletic	91	(14)
2026–	Shamrock Rovers	28	(0)

International career
2012–2013	Republic of Ireland U17	5	(0)
2013	Republic of Ireland U19	1	(0)
2016–2018	Republic of Ireland U21	8	(1)
- * Club domestic league appearances and goals as of 13:54, 9 November 2026 (UTC)

Jake David Mulraney (born 5 April 1996) is an Irish professional footballer who plays as a midfielder for League of Ireland Premier Division club Shamrock Rovers.

Born in Dublin, Mulraney has previously played for Ilkeston, Queens Park Rangers, Inverness Caledonian Thistle, Heart of Midlothian, Atlanta United, Orlando City and St Patrick's Athletic, while he also had loan spells at Dagenham & Redbridge and Stevenage during his career.

== Club career ==
=== Queens Park Rangers ===
On 10 December 2014 Mulraney, who had been playing for Ilkeston following his release by Nottingham Forest, signed an 18-month professional contract with Premier League side Queens Park Rangers.

==== Dagenham & Redbridge loan ====
On 7 October 2015, Mulraney joined Dagenham & Redbridge on a one-month loan deal. He made his debut the same day in a 2–1 victory away to Stevenage in the Football League Trophy coming on as a substitute in the 54th minute.

==== Stevenage loan ====
On 5 March 2016, he joined EFL League Two club Stevenage on a one-month loan deal. He scored 1 goal in 6 appearances during his loan spell.

=== Inverness Caledonian Thistle ===
On 17 June 2016, Mulraney joined Inverness Caledonian Thistle on a two-year deal.

=== Heart of Midlothian ===
On 15 May 2018, Mulraney joined Heart of Midlothian in a swap deal for Angus Beith. On 25 May 2019, he started in the 2019 Scottish Cup Final, as his side were defeated 2–1 by Celtic at Hampden Park. Mulraney scored two goals in 52 appearances for Hearts.

=== Atlanta United ===
On 28 January 2020, Mulraney joined Major League Soccer club Atlanta United. He made his debut for the club on 25 February 2020 in the CONCACAF Champions League against Motagua, starting in the 3–0 victory. Mulraney scored his first goal for Atlanta United on 14 October 2020 against Inter Miami, his 83rd-minute goal being the equalizer in the 1–1 draw.

=== Orlando City ===
On 5 May 2022, Atlanta United transferred Mulraney to Orlando City in exchange for $200,000 in General Allocation Money with a potential further $75,000 in GAM pending performance-based conditions. The deal included a percentage of the fee from any future sale.

=== St Patrick's Athletic ===
==== 2023 season ====
On 18 January 2023, it was announced that Mulraney had returned to Ireland, signing for his local League of Ireland Premier Division club St Patrick's Athletic on a multi-year contract, with the terms of the transfer undisclosed. He grew up a fan of the club, attending games from the age of 7 or 8 with his grandfather. His first goal for the club came on 17 March 2023, an 89th-minute equaliser via a 25-yard strike into the bottom corner in a 2–2 draw away to rivals Shamrock Rovers at Tallaght Stadium. He followed that up by scoring in his next game, in a 3–0 win over UCD at Richmond Park. On 7 April 2023, Mulraney opened the scoring in a 4–0 win over Cork City at Richmond Park. On 5 May 2023, he levelled the scores at 2–2 in an eventual 3–2 win away to Cork City at Turners Cross, by finding the top right hand corner from 20 yards in the 55th minute. On 23 June 2023, Mulraney scored a free-kick in a 1–0 derby win at home to Shelbourne, finding the underside of the crossbar in the top right corner in the 68th minute of the match. Mulroney scored his 6th goal of the season on 7 July 2023 when he found the top corner from 20 yards in a 1–1 draw against Cork City at Richmond Park. On 12 July 2023, Mulraney made his first appearance in European competition in a 2–1 loss against F91 Dudelange in the first qualifying round of the UEFA Europa Conference League at the Stade Jos Nosbaum. On 28 October 2023, he was announced as the club's Goal of the Season award winner, for his free-kick against Shelbourne. On 12 November 2023, Mulraney was part of the starting XI in the 2023 FAI Cup Final, providing 2 assists for his side's first 2 goals in a 3–1 win over Bohemians in front of a record breaking FAI Cup Final crowd of 43,881 at the Aviva Stadium.

==== 2024 season ====
He scored his first goal of the season on 15 March 2024 at home to Shelbourne, heading home a Brandon Kavanagh cross 10 minutes after coming off the bench. His second goal of the season came on 20 May when he equalised at home to Shelbourne by finding the top right corner with a 25-yard free-kick. On 25 July 2024, Mulraney score the first European goals of his career in a 3–1 win at home to Vaduz of Liechtenstein in the UEFA Conference League, opening the scoring with a free kick from 20 yards in the 6th minute before adding a second goal from just inside the box 11 minutes later after being played in by Romal Palmer. On 1 September 2024, he scored twice in a 4–1 win at home to Drogheda United. On 27 September 2024, he scored his sides second and third goals in a 3–0 win away to rivals Shamrock Rovers at Tallaght Stadium. He was named as League of Ireland Player of the Month for September 2024. On 14 October 2024, Mulraney put his side 2–0 up in an eventual 3–1 victory over Bohemians at Dalymount Park. At the club's end of season awards, Mulraney was named Player of the Year as voted by the clubs supporters, while he also picked up the club's Goal of the Season award for the second year running, for his second goal away to Shamrock Rovers in September.

==== 2025 season ====
On 20 January 2025, Mulraney signed a new multi-year contract extension with the club. He made his 100th appearance in all competitions for the club on 27 June 2025, in a 0–0 draw with Cork City at Turners Cross. On 20 July 2025, Mulraney scored his first goal of the season, coming off the bench at half time before finding the bottom corner from 20 yards in an 8–0 win over UCC in an FAI Cup tie at Richmond Park. On 31 July 2025, Mulraney scored an equalising goal from 25 yards out in extra time away to Estonian side Nõmme Kalju in the UEFA Conference League, to earn his side a Third Qualifying round tie with Turkish giants Beşiktaş. On 10 August 2025, he scored his first and only league of the season, opening the scoring in a 3–0 win over Sligo Rovers at Richmond Park. On 14 September 2025, Mulraney opened the scoring in a 3–1 win at home to Galway United in the FAI Cup Quarter Final. After a poor season both collectively and personally in which he scored just one league goal, it was reported in December 2025 that the club were willing to listen to offers for Mulraney ahead of the 2026 season, as they looked to get rid of some of their higher earning under performing players.

=== Shamrock Rovers ===
On 8 January 2026, Mulraney signed for Pats' League of Ireland Premier Division rivals Shamrock Rovers, with Darragh Nugent moving the other way as part of the deal.

== Career statistics ==
As of match played on 23 October 2026

Appearances and goals by club, season and competition
Club	Season	League			National Cup (Note: Includes FA Cup, Scottish Cup, U.S. Open Cup & FAI Cup)		League Cup (Note: Includes EFL Cup & Scottish League Cup)		Continental		Other		Total	
Club	Season	Division	Apps	Goals	Apps	Goals	Apps	Goals	Apps	Goals	Apps	Goals	Apps	Goals
Ilkeston	2014–15	NPL Premier Division	2	0	1	0	—		—		0	0	3	0
Queens Park Rangers	2014–15	Premier League	0	0	0	0	0	0	—		—		0	0
Queens Park Rangers	2015–16	EFL Championship	0	0	—		0	0	—		—		0	0
Queens Park Rangers	Total		0	0	0	0	0	0	—		—		0	0
Dagenham & Redbridge (loan)	2015–16	EFL League Two	6	0	1	0	—		—		2 (Note: Appearance(s) in the Football League Trophy)	0	9	0
Stevenage (loan)	2015–16	EFL League Two	6	1	—		—		—		—		6	1
Inverness Caledonian Thistle	2016–17	Scottish Premiership	26	0	1	0	5	0	—		—		32	0
Inverness Caledonian Thistle	2017–18	Scottish Championship	26	2	1	0	3	0	—		2 (Note: Appearance(s) in the Scottish Challenge Cup)	1	32	3
Inverness Caledonian Thistle	Total		52	2	2	0	8	0	—		2	1	64	3
Heart of Midlothian	2018–19	Scottish Premiership	21	1	5	0	4	0	—		—		30	1
Heart of Midlothian	2019–20	Scottish Premiership	17	1	0	0	5	0	—		—		22	1
Heart of Midlothian	Total		38	2	5	0	9	0	—		—		52	2
Atlanta United	2020	Major League Soccer	18	1	—		—		3 (Note: Appearance(s) in the CONCACAF Champions League)	0	—		21	1
Atlanta United	2021	Major League Soccer	22	1	—		—		3	0	1 (Note: Appearance(s) in the MLS Cup Playoffs)	0	26	1
Atlanta United	2022	Major League Soccer	7	1	1	0	—		—		—		8	1
Atlanta United	Total		47	3	1	0	0	0	6	0	1	0	55	3
Orlando City	2022	Major League Soccer	17	0	—		—		—		1	0	18	0
Orlando City B	2022	MLS Next Pro	1	0	—		—		—		—		1	0
St Patrick's Athletic	2023	LOI Premier Division	29	6	5	0	—		2 (Note: Appearance(s) in the UEFA Europa Conference League)	0	0 (Note: Appearance(s) in the Leinster Senior Cup)	0	36	6
St Patrick's Athletic	2024	LOI Premier Division	31	7	1	0	—		6 (Note: Appearance(s) in the UEFA Conference League)	2	2 (Note: 1 appearance in the President of Ireland's Cup; 1 appearance in the Leinster Senior Cup)	0	40	9
St Patrick's Athletic	2025	LOI Premier Division	31	1	4	2	—		6	1	6	0	47	4
St Patrick's Athletic	Total		91	14	10	2	—		14	3	8	0	123	19
Shamrock Rovers	2026	LOI Premier Division	28	0	0	0	—		6 (Note: 4 appearances in the UEFA Champions League; 2 appearances in the UEFA Europa League)	0	2 (Note: 1 appearance in the President of Ireland's Cup; 1 appearance in the Leinster Senior Cup)	0	36	0
Career total			288	22	20	2	17	0	26	3	16	1	368	28

== Honours ==
=== Club ===
Inverness Caledonian Thistle

- Scottish Challenge Cup: 2017–18

St Patrick's Athletic

- FAI Cup: 2023
- Leinster Senior Cup: 2023–24

=== Individual ===
- St Patrick's Athletic Player of the Year (1): 2024
- League of Ireland Player of the Month (1): September 2024
- St Patrick's Athletic Goal of the Season (2): 2023 (vs. Shelbourne), 2024 (vs. Shamrock Rovers)
