= Zack Elbouzedi =

Irish footballer (born 1998)

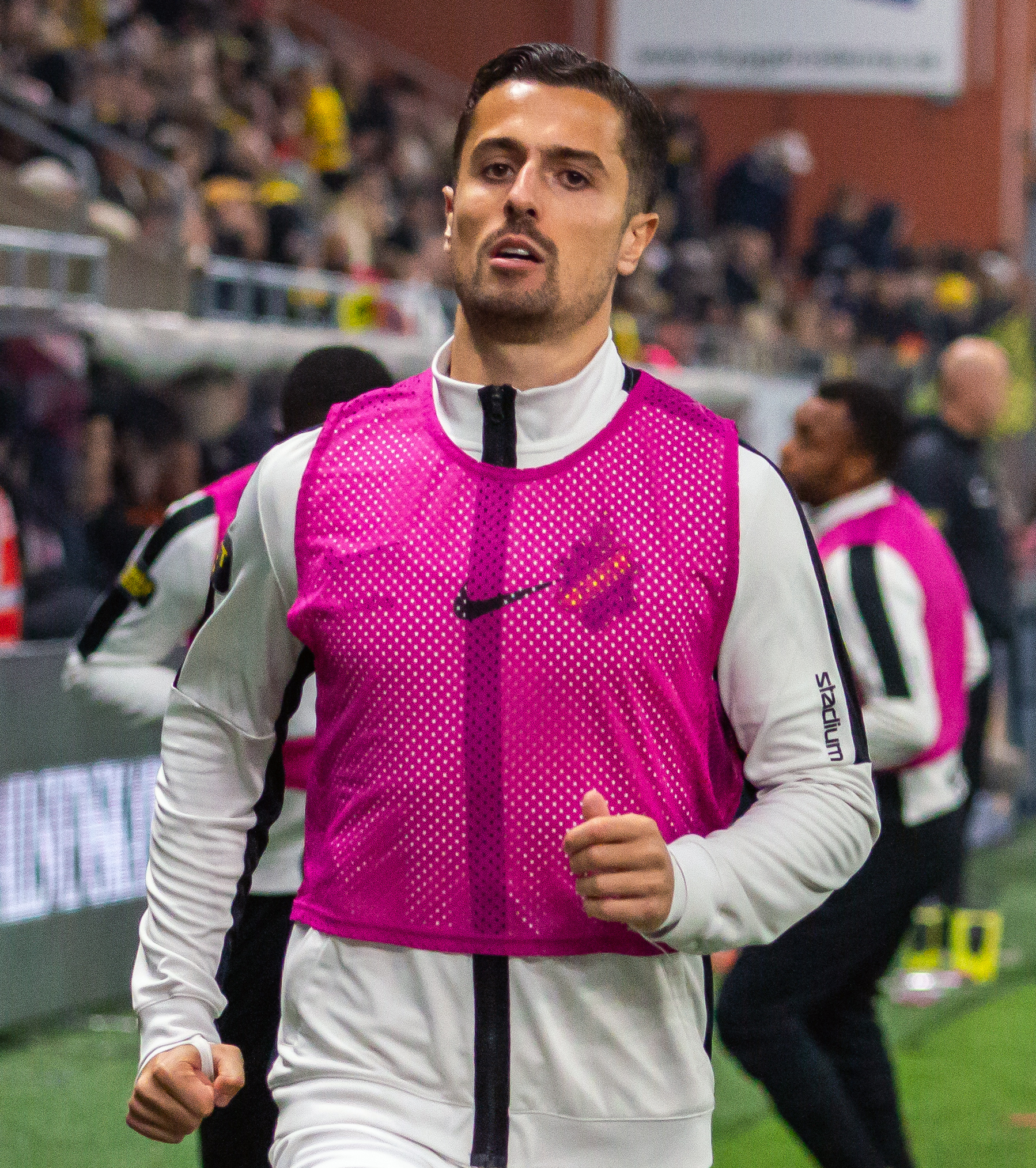
- Elbouzedi in 2023

Personal information
- Full name: Zachary Elbouzedi
- Date of birth: 5 April 1998 (age 28)
- Place of birth: Swords, County Dublin, Ireland
- Position: Midfielder

Team information
- Current team: St Patrick's Athletic
- Number: 7

Youth career
- –2014: Malahide United
- 2014–2017: West Bromwich Albion

Senior career*
Years	Team	Apps	(Gls)
2017–2018	Inverness Caledonian Thistle	4	(0)
2018	→ Elgin City (loan)	3	(0)
2019	Waterford	27	(6)
2020–2021	Lincoln City	7	(0)
2021	→ Bolton Wanderers (loan)	14	(0)
2021–2024	AIK	52	(2)
2024	→ Swindon Town (loan)	17	(0)
2024–	St Patrick's Athletic	58	(8)

International career
2012	Republic of Ireland U15	4	(2)
2013–2014	Republic of Ireland U16	7	(0)
2014–2015	Republic of Ireland U17	12	(1)
2016	Republic of Ireland U18	2	(0)
2016–2018	Republic of Ireland U19	10	(1)
2019–2020	Republic of Ireland U21	13	(3)
- * Club domestic league appearances and goals as of 23:42, 30 October 2026 (UTC)

Zachary Elbouzedi (born 5 April 1998) is an Irish professional footballer who plays as a midfielder for League of Ireland Premier Division club St Patrick's Athletic.

== Club career ==
=== Inverness Caledonian Thistle ===
Elbouzedi began playing football as a schoolboy with Malahide United before moving to West Bromwich Albion in 2014. He joined Inverness Caledonian Thistle on a free transfer deal in the summer of 2017. He was not able to play immediately due to an injury, but manager John Robertson believed he would compete for a place in the team when healthy.

==== Elgin City (loan) ====
He was signed by Elgin City on a 28-day long emergency loan contract on 30 December 2017.

After working himself back to match fitness by playing for Elgin City, Elbouzedi made his professional debut for Inverness Caledonian Thistle on 13 March 2018 against Dunfermline Athletic.

=== Waterford ===
Elbouzedi left Inverness on 31 August 2018, after terminating his contract by mutual consent after an injury ravaged season and only playing in one game in the 2018–19 season, which was a League Cup win over Cove Rangers.

On 7 November 2018, Elbouzedi joined League of Ireland Premier Division side Waterford.

He made 29 appearances for the Blues in all competitions, scoring 6 goals in an impressive season personally despite a disappointing season for the club as they finished in sixth place.

=== Lincoln City ===
On 16 December 2019, it was announced that Elbouzedi would move to English club Lincoln City on 1 January 2020 after signing a long-term deal with the club. He scored his first goal for Lincoln in an EFL Trophy tie against Shrewsbury Town on 8 December 2020.

==== Bolton Wanderers (loan) ====
On 16 January 2021, he would join Bolton Wanderers on loan for the remainder of the season. He would make his debut a few hours later, starting the EFL League Two game against Cheltenham Town.

=== AIK ===
On 15 July 2021, it was confirmed that he would join Swedish Allsvenskan side AIK for an undisclosed fee, signing a contract until 31 December 2024. He would make his AIK and Allsvenskan debut just a few days later, coming off the bench in the 85th minute against Kalmar FF.

==== Swindon Town (loan) ====
On 30 January 2024, it was confirmed that he had joined EFL League Two club Swindon Town on loan until the end of the 2023–24 season.

=== St Patrick's Athletic ===
==== 2024 season ====
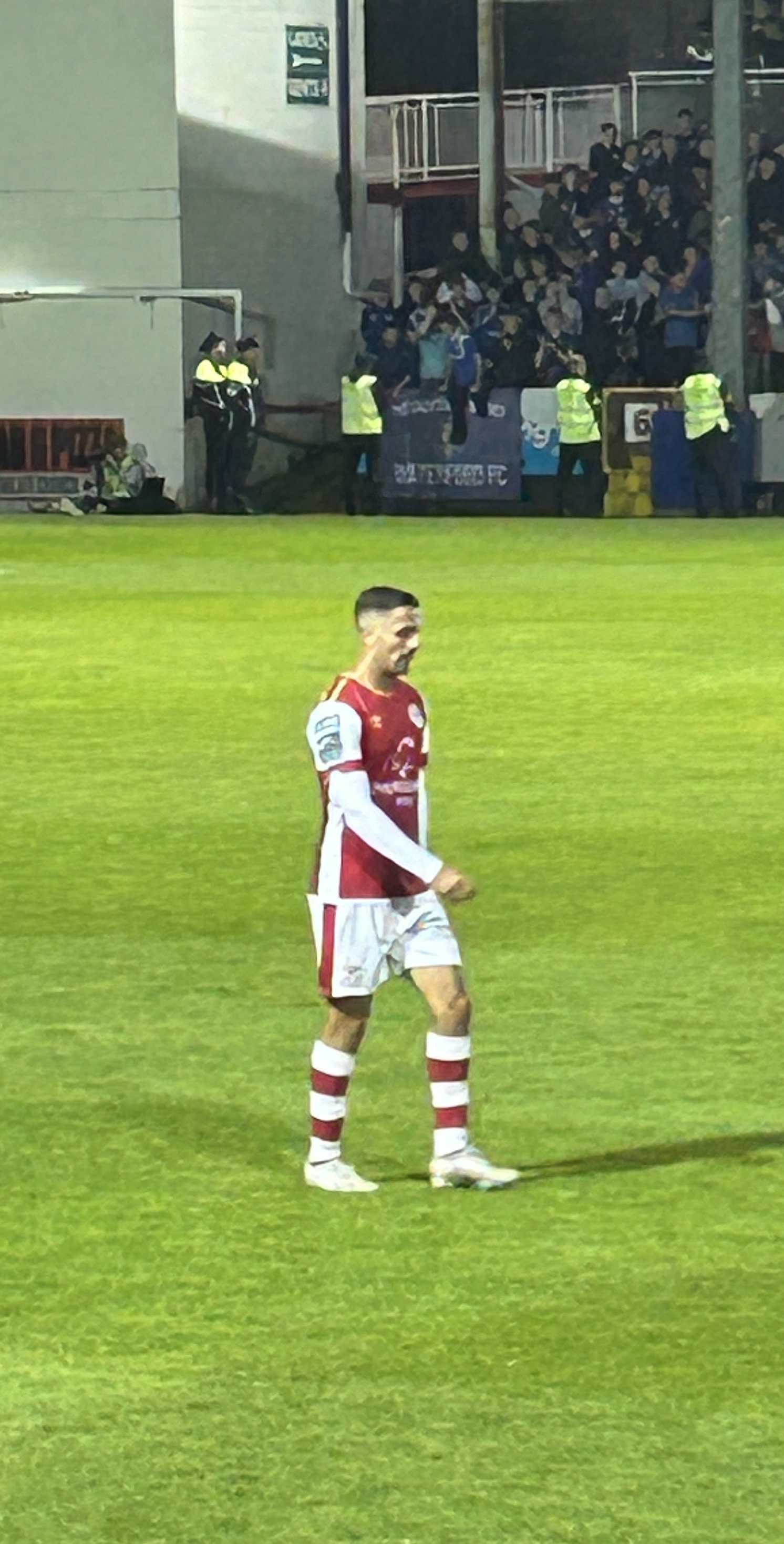
Elbouzedi in action for St Patrick's Athletic in 2024.

On 17 July 2024, it was announced that Elbouzedi had returned to Dublin, signing for League of Ireland Premier Division club St Patrick's Athletic on a multi-year contract. He made his debut for the club on 21 July 2024, replacing Kian Leavy from the bench in the 63rd minute of an FAI Cup defeat away to Derry City. On 25 July 2024, Elbouzedi made his first start for the club, in a 3–1 win over Vaduz of Liechtenstein in the UEFA Conference League. He scored his first goal for the club in the away leg against Vaduz, levelling the scores at 1–1 in an eventual 2–2 draw at the Rheinpark Stadion to secure progression to the Third Qualifying round where his side would face Sabah of Azerbaijan. On 15 August 2024, he scored the only goal of the game in his sides away win over Sabah at the Bank Respublika Arena to earn a tie with Turkish side İstanbul Başakşehir in the Play-off Round of the UEFA Conference League.

==== 2025 season ====
On 28 February 2025, he scored his first goal of the 2025 season, opening the scoring in a 4–3 win over Sligo Rovers at Richmond Park. He scored his second goal of the season on 2 May 2025, adding a second goal with a deflected effort from 25 yards in a 2–0 win at home to Galway United to put his side top of the league. On 16 May 2025, Elbouzedi replaced Aidan Keena from the bench in the 70th minute of 3–2 victory over Cork City at Richmond Park, as he scored the equaliser in the 89th minute, before assisting Jamie Lennon's 95th-minute winner. On 24 July 2025, Elbouzedi suffered a dislocated shoulder in a 1–0 win win over Estonian side Nõmme Kalju on the UEFA Conference League, with the injury requiring surgery that would keep him out of action for the rest of the season, resulting in winger Jordon Garrick being signed as short term cover.

==== 2026 season ====
Having returned from injury during pre-season, Elbouzedi scored his first goal of the season on 27 February 2026, in a 4–0 win over Dundalk at Richmond Park, though he was forced off injured in the second half with the recovery period set to be several weeks. He returned from injury on 17 April 2026 after missing 9 games, starting the game in a 3–1 win away to Drogheda United. On 8 May 2026, Elbouzedi scored twice and assisted another goal in a 4–1 win at home to his former club Waterford, with his second goal being a top corner finish from 25 yards. On 12 June 2026, he scored another goal from outside the box, finding the bottom left corner from 22 yards to seal a 2–0 win over Drogheda United.

== International career ==
Elbouzedi has represented the Republic of Ireland at youth international level. He remains eligible to play for the Libya national football team due to his father being Libyan and has been contacted about representing Libya but has always stated he only ever wanted to play for the Republic of Ireland. Elbouzedi was capped at under 21 level for the first time in 2019 and was selected for their squad for the 2019 Toulon Tournament.

== Personal life ==
Elbouzedi was born in Dublin to a Libyan father and an Irish mother.

== Career statistics ==
As of match played on 30 October 2026

Appearances and goals by club, season and competition
Club	Season	League			National cup (Note: Includes FA Cup, Scottish Cup, FAI Cup & Svenska Cupen)		League cup (Note: Includes EFL Cup, Scottish League Cup & League of Ireland Cup)		Europe		Other		Total	
Club	Season	Division	Apps	Goals	Apps	Goals	Apps	Goals	Apps	Goals	Apps	Goals	Apps	Goals
West Bromwich Albion	2016–17	Premier League	0	0	0	0	0	0	–		2 (Note: Appearances for West Bromwich Albion U23 in the EFL Trophy)	0	2	0
Inverness Caledonian Thistle	2017–18	Scottish Championship	4	0	0	0	0	0	–		1 (Note: Appearances in the Scottish Challenge Cup)	0	5	0
Inverness Caledonian Thistle	2018–19	Scottish Championship	0	0	0	0	1	0	–		0	0	1	0
Inverness Caledonian Thistle	Total		4	0	0	0	1	0	–		1	0	6	0
Elgin City (loan)	2017–18	Scottish League Two	3	0	–		–		–		–		3	0
Waterford	2019	LOI Premier Division	27	6	0	0	2	0	–		0	0	29	6
Lincoln City	2019–20	EFL League One	5	0	–		–		–		–		5	0
Lincoln City	2020–21	EFL League One	2	0	1	0	0	0	–		3	2	6	2
Lincoln City	Total		7	0	1	0	0	0	–		3	2	11	2
Bolton Wanderers (loan)	2020–21	EFL League Two	14	0	–		–		–		–		14	0
AIK	2021	Allsvenskan	20	1	1	0	–		–		–		21	1
AIK	2022	Allsvenskan	25	1	5	2	–		4 (Note: Appearances in the UEFA Europa Conference League)	0	–		34	3
AIK	2023	Allsvenskan	7	0	1	0	–		–		–		8	0
AIK	2024	Allsvenskan	0	0	0	0	–		–		–		0	0
AIK	Total		52	2	7	2	–		4	0	–		63	4
Swindon Town (loan)	2023–24	EFL League Two	17	0	–		–		–		–		17	0
St Patrick's Athletic	2024	LOI Premier Division	11	1	1	0	–		6 (Note: Appearances in the UEFA Conference League)	2	0 (Note: Appearances in the Leinster Senior Cup)	0	18	3
St Patrick's Athletic	2025	LOI Premier Division	25	3	1	0	—		3	0	2	0	31	3
St Patrick's Athletic	2026	LOI Premier Division	22	4	2	0	—		—		0	0	24	4
St Patrick's Athletic	Total		58	8	4	0	—		9	2	2	0	73	10
Career total			178	16	12	2	3	0	13	2	8	2	217	22

== Honours ==
Inverness CT

- Scottish Challenge Cup: 2017–18

Bolton Wanderers

- EFL League Two third-place (promotion): 2020–21
