= Simon Power (footballer) =

Irish footballer (born 1998)

Personal information
- Full name: Simon Power
- Date of birth: 13 May 1998 (age 28)
- Place of birth: Greystones, Ireland
- Height: 1.77 m (5 ft 10 in)
- Position: Midfielder

Team information
- Current team: St Patrick's Athletic
- Number: 25

Youth career
- Greystones United
- St Joseph's Boys
- –2015: Cabinteely

Senior career*
Years	Team	Apps	(Gls)
2015	Cabinteely	1	(0)
2016–2018	UCD	13	(1)
2018–2021	Norwich City	0	(0)
2019	→ Dordrecht (loan)	10	(1)
2019	→ Ross County (loan)	1	(0)
2020	→ Kings Lynn Town (loan)	6	(2)
2020–2021	→ Kings Lynn Town (loan)	11	(2)
2021–2022	Harrogate Town	39	(2)
2022–2023	Shamrock Rovers	8	(2)
2024	Sligo Rovers	19	(4)
2025–	St Patrick's Athletic	29	(2)

International career
- Republic of Ireland U18
- Republic of Ireland U19
2019	Republic of Ireland U21	4	(0)
- * Club domestic league appearances and goals as of 23:03, 26 June 2026 (UTC)

Simon Power (born 13 May 1998) is an Irish professional footballer who plays as a midfielder for St Patrick's Athletic. He represented Ireland at youth level.

== Club career ==
=== Early career ===
Born in Greystones, Power started his career as a youth player for Greystones United and later played youth football for St Josephs Boys and then Cabinteely before making his senior debut for Cabinteely in August 2015 as a substitute against Finn Harps. He later signed for UCD, where he made 13 league appearances and scored one goal.

=== Norwich City ===
In January 2018, Power joined Norwich City on an 18-month contract following a trial period with the club.

==== Dordrecht loan ====
Power agreed a two-year extension to his deal in January 2019, six months before it was due to expire, and also joined Eerste Divisie side Dordrecht on loan until the end of the season. He made 10 appearances for Dordrecht and scored one goal.

==== Ross County loan ====
On 4 July 2019, Power joined newly promoted Scottish Premiership side Ross County on loan. On 13 July 2019 he made his debut for the club against Montrose in the Scottish League Cup. However, he was recalled by Norwich in January 2020 after making just 4 senior appearances.

==== Kings Lynn Town loans ====
In January 2020, he joined National League North side Kings Lynn Town on loan until the end of the season. He made six appearances and scored twice as Kings Lynn were promoted to the National League.

In August 2020, he returned to Kings Lynn Town on a season-long loan. His loan was cut short in January 2021 in order to join Harrogate Town on a permanent deal, having made 13 appearances and scored two goals for the Linnets in all competitions.

=== Harrogate Town ===
On 18 January 2021, Power joined League Two side Harrogate Town on a free transfer. He made his first league appearance for the Sulphurites in the No. 30 shirt on 22 January 2021 in a 2–2 away draw at Salford City, and scored his first league goal on 6 February in a 3–1 win at Crawley Town. He was released by Harrogate in summer 2022.

=== Shamrock Rovers ===
In July 2022 Power returned home to sign for League of Ireland Premier Division club Shamrock Rovers. He made just 12 appearances, scoring 2 goals in all competitions during an injury hit 18 months at the club.

=== Sligo Rovers ===
On 20 December 2023, Power signed for Sligo Rovers. On 28 June 2024, Power scored both goals in a 2–0 win over his former side Shamrock Rovers at The Showgrounds. He scored 4 goals in 20 appearances during his one season at the club.

=== St Patrick's Athletic ===
On 11 November 2024, Power signed a 2-year contract with St Patrick's Athletic. He scored on his debut on 18 January 2025, opening the scoring in a 2–0 win away to Inchicore Athletic in the Leinster Senior Cup. Power scored his first league goal for the club on 20 June 2025, in a defeat away to Galway United at Eamonn Deacy Park. On 7 August 2025, he scored a consolation goal for his side in a defeat to Turkish giants Beşiktaş in the UEFA Conference League. On 17 October 2025, Power scored the only goal of the game in a 1–0 victory over his former club Shamrock Rovers at Richmond Park, by firing into the top right corner from 25 yards. On 16 January 2026, Power suffered a knee injury in a pre-season friendly against Bray Wanderers that would keep him out of action for six months. He made his return from injury on 26 June 2026, coming off the bench away to Bohemians in his side's 22nd league game of the season. Some niggling muscle injuries saw his next appearance come on 16 August 2026, when he replaced James Brown at half time on an FAI Cup tie at home to Shamrock Rovers, with his side trailing 2–0, he helped them to a comeback that saw them win 3–2 in extra-time, although he was substituted off with a season ending knee injury.

== International career ==
Power has represented Republic of Ireland at under-18, under-19 and under-21 levels.

== Personal life ==
His father Rory played for Greystones United and Dalkey United and his brother Joe is also a footballer. His older sister Sophie has represented Ireland at tag rugby.

== Career statistics ==
As of match played on 16 August 2026

Appearances and goals by club, season and competition
Club	Season	League			National Cup (Note: Includes FAI Cup, FA Cup, KNVB Cup & Scottish Cup)		League Cup (Note: Includes League of Ireland Cup, EFL Cup & Scottish League Cup)		Europe		Other		Total	
Club	Season	Division	Apps	Goals	Apps	Goals	Apps	Goals	Apps	Goals	Apps	Goals	Apps	Goals
Cabinteely	2015	LOI First Division	1	0	0	0	0	0	—		0	0	1	0
UCD	2016	LOI First Division	3	0	0	0	0	0	—		0	0	3	0
UCD	2017	LOI First Division	10	1	0	0	0	0	—		0	0	10	1
UCD	Total		13	1	0	0	0	0	—		0	0	13	1
Norwich City	2018–19	Championship	0	0	0	0	0	0	—		—		0	0
Norwich City	2019–20	Premier League	0	0	0	0	0	0	—		—		0	0
Norwich City	2020–21	Championship	0	0	0	0	0	0	—		—		0	0
Norwich City	Total		0	0	0	0	0	0	—		—		0	0
Dordrecht (loan)	2018–19	Eerste Divisie	10	1	0	0	—		—		—		10	1
Ross County (loan)	2019–20	Scottish Premiership	1	0	0	0	3	0	—		—		4	0
Kings Lynn Town (loan)	2019–20	National League North	6	2	0	0	—		—		0	0	6	2
Kings Lynn Town (loan)	2020–21	National League	11	2	2	0	—		—		0	0	13	2
Harrogate Town	2020–21	League Two	13	1	0	0	0	0	—		0	0	14	1
Harrogate Town	2021–22	League Two	26	1	1	1	0	0	—		2 (Note: Appearance in the EFL Trophy)	0	29	2
Harrogate Town	Total		39	2	1	1	0	0	—		2	0	43	2
Shamrock Rovers	2022	LOI Premier Division	3	1	2	0	—		1 (Note: Appearance in the UEFA Europa Conference League)	0	—		6	1
Shamrock Rovers	2023	LOI Premier Division	5	1	0	0	—		0	0	1 (Note: Appearance in the Leinster Senior Cup)	0	6	1
Shamrock Rovers	Total		8	2	2	0	—		1	0	1	0	12	2
Sligo Rovers	2024	LOI Premier Division	19	4	1	0	—		—		—		20	4
St Patrick's Athletic	2025	LOI Premier Division	28	2	3	0	—		6 (Note: Appearances in the UEFA Conference League)	1	2	1	39	4
St Patrick's Athletic	2026	LOI Premier Division	1	0	1	0	—		—		0	0	2	0
St Patrick's Athletic	Total		29	2	4	0	—		6	1	2	1	41	4
Career total			137	16	10	1	3	0	7	1	5	1	162	19

== Honours ==
Shamrock Rovers

- League of Ireland Premier Division (2): 2022, 2023
