= Danyl Mashchenko =

Ukrainian footballer (born 2002)

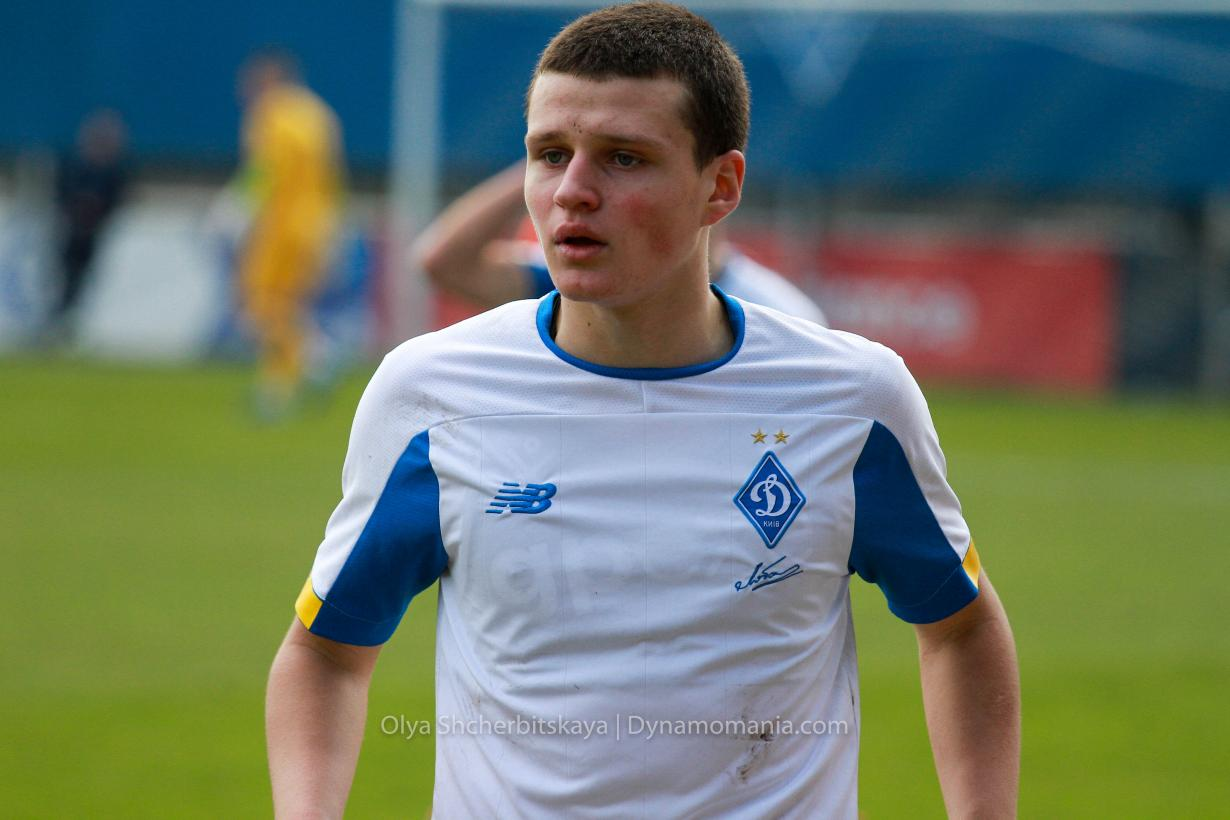

Personal information
- Full name: Danyl Yuriyovych Mashchenko
- Date of birth: 30 September 2002 (age 24)
- Place of birth: Bucha, Ukraine
- Height: 1.82 m (6 ft 0 in)
- Position: Left-back

Team information
- Current team: Nõmme Kalju
- Number: 78

Youth career
- 2014: DYuSSh Bucha
- 2015–2019: Zmina-Obolon Kyiv

Senior career*
Years	Team	Apps	(Gls)
2019–2021	Dynamo Kyiv	0	(0)
2021–2022	Prykarpattia Ivano-Frankivsk	2	(0)
2023	Harju JK Laagri	28	(0)
2024–	Nõmme Kalju	90	(6)
- * Club domestic league appearances and goals as of 17 November 2026

Danyl Yuriyovych Mashchenko (Ukrainian: Данил Юрійович Мащенко; born 30 September 2002) is a Ukrainian professional footballer who plays as a left-back for Estonian club Nõmme Kalju.

== Honours ==
Individual

- Meistriliiga Goal of the Season: 2024
