= Brandon Kavanagh =

Irish footballer (born 2000)

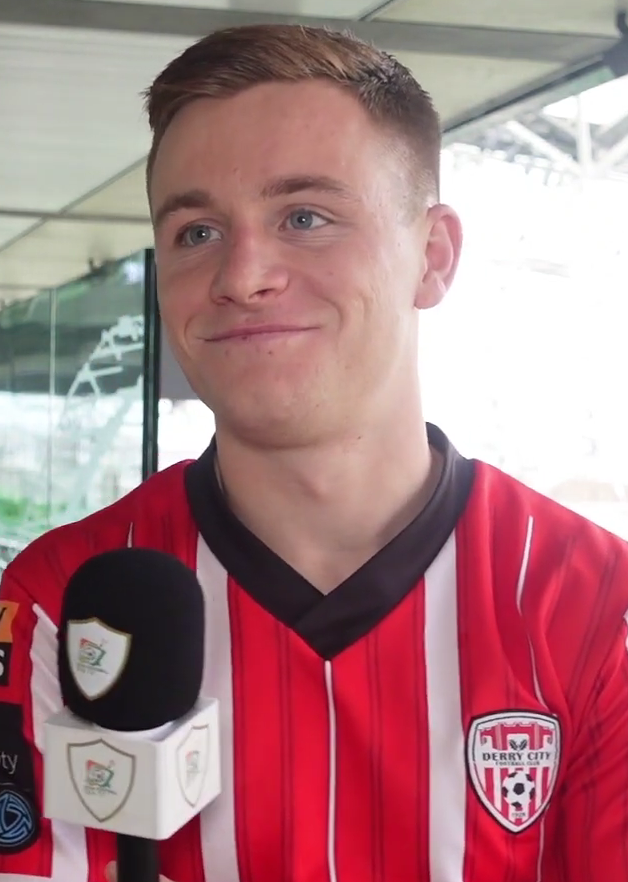
- Kavanagh with Derry City in 2023

Personal information
- Date of birth: 21 September 2000 (age 26)
- Place of birth: Dublin, Republic of Ireland
- Position: Attacking midfielder

Team information
- Current team: Drogheda United
- Number: 10

Youth career
- Crumlin United
- St Francis
- –2016: St Joseph's Boys
- 2016: Bray Wanderers
- 2016–2017: Bohemians
- 2018–2020: Shamrock Rovers

Senior career*
Years	Team	Apps	(Gls)
2018–2021	Shamrock Rovers	40	(1)
2020	→ Shamrock Rovers II	16	(9)
2021	→ Bray Wanderers (loan)	27	(6)
2022–2023	Derry City	60	(6)
2024–2025	St Patrick's Athletic	62	(8)
2026–	Drogheda United	35	(5)

International career^{‡}
2016–2017	Republic of Ireland U17	7	(0)
2019	Republic of Ireland U19	4	(0)
2019	Republic of Ireland U21	2	(1)
- * Club domestic league appearances and goals as of 18:02, 10 November 2026 (UTC) ‡ National team caps and goals as of 14:12, 20 November 2023 (UTC)

Brandon Kavanagh (born 21 September 2000) is an Irish professional footballer who plays as a midfielder for League of Ireland First Division club Drogheda United. His previous clubs are Shamrock Rovers, Bray Wanderers, Derry City and St Patrick's Athletic.

== Career ==
=== Youth career ===
A native of Crumlin, Dublin, Kavanagh grew up as a St Patrick's Athletic fan and attended games with his Grandad. He began playing with local side Crumlin United, before moving on to St Francis, St Joseph's Boys, Bray Wanderers, Bohemians and finally Shamrock Rovers. While at St Joseph's Boys, he was part of a formidable side that included fellow future professional footballers Joe Redmond, Aaron Bolger, Jonathan Afolabi, Andy Lyons, Promise Omochere, Ryan Burke and Max Murphy among others. He had trials with Birmingham City, Southampton, Brighton & Hove Albion and Sheffield United as a youth player, none of which materialised in a move.

=== Shamrock Rovers ===
Kavanagh made his senior debut for Shamrock Rovers on 7 February 2018 in a 2–1 Leinster Senior Cup win over St Mochta's at Tallaght Stadium, in which he opened the scoring from the penalty spot in the 33rd minute. On 16 April 2018, he made his league debut for the club, replacing Sean Kavanagh from the bench in the 73rd minute of a 1–0 defeat away to Bray Wanderers at the Carlisle Grounds. He made 19 appearances in all competitions in his first season at senior level with the club. On 18 October 2019, Kavanagh scored his first career League of Ireland Premier Division goal, netting in a 3–0 win away to UCD, which saw the home side's relegation confirmed. He made 24 appearances in all competitions in the 2019 season and was also part of the matchday squad for the 2019 FAI Cup Final which his side won on penalties against Dundalk at the Aviva Stadium. With first team involvement limited in 2020, Kavanagh mainly featured for the club's reserve side Shamrock Rovers II in the League of Ireland First Division, scoring 9 goals in 16 appearances which saw him named in the PFAI First Division Team of the Year. In December 2020, he was linked with a move to Premier League side Crystal Palace.

==== Bray Wanderers loan ====
On 19 January 2021, he joined League of Ireland First Division side Bray Wanderers on a season long loan. Kavanagh's 7 goals in 31 games in all competitions over the season, saw him named in the PFAI First Division Team of the Year for the second year running.

=== Derry City ===
On 7 December 2021, it was announced that Derry City had signed Kavanagh from Shamrock Rovers for an undisclosed fee, signing a 3-year contract with the club. He made his first career appearance in European competition on 14 July 2022, in a 2–0 loss away to Riga in the UEFA Europa Conference League. On 13 November 2022, Kavanagh came off the bench in the 2022 FAI Cup Final, in a 4–0 win over Shelbourne at the Aviva Stadium, a record Cup Final scoreline margin. His first season with the club saw him score 2 goals in 37 appearances in all competitions. His second season with Derry saw him feature in 5 of the 6 games in their UEFA Europa Conference League campaign, playing at home and away against HB of Faroe Islands, at home to KuPS of Finland and home and away to Tobol of Kazakhstan, against whom he scored in the penalty shootout in the second leg at Tallaght Stadium, as his side were defeated 6–5 on penalties. He scored 6 goals in 36 appearances in all competitions in 2023. In November 2023, it was reported that Derry City had agreed a fee for Kavanagh with recent FAI Cup winners St Patrick's Athletic.

=== St Patrick's Athletic ===
==== 2024 season ====
On 21 November 2023, it was announced that Kavanagh had signed a multi-year contract with his boyhood club St Patrick's Athletic for an undisclosed fee. He made his debut for the club on 3 February 2024, scoring the final goal of the game in a 3–1 win away to UCD in the Leinster Senior Cup. His first league goal for the club came on 19 April 2024, when he scored the equaliser in a 1–1 draw with Waterford at Richmond Park. On 13 June 2024, he came off the bench in the 90th minute before heading home the winning goal in the 96th minute of a 2–1 win at home to rivals Shamrock Rovers. On 4 August 2024, Kavanagh came off the bench in the 60th minute at home to Sligo Rovers and 5 minutes later scored an equaliser from 30 yards before scoring again in the 10th minute of injury time from the penalty spot to secure a 3–2 win for his side. Kavanagh's goal and assist in the derby away to rivals Shelbourne on 30 September 2024 helped his side to a 3–2 win. On 24 October 2024, Kavanagh scored the only goal of the game as his side defeated his old club Derry City at Richmond Park in a crucial win in the hunt for European football for the following season. He finished the season with the most assists and goal contributions of any player in the league, with 6 league goals and 14 league assists over the season.

==== 2025 season ====
On 24 January 2025, Kavanagh scored his first goals of the season, scoring a Hat-trick in a 3–3 draw away to Athlone Town in the Leinster Senior Cup. On 28 March 2025, he scored his first league goal of the season in a 2–1 win away to Waterford at the RSC, finding the top corner with a 90th minute free kick to win the game, having assisted the equaliser 2 minutes earlier. On 11 April 2025, Kavanagh found the bottom right corner from 30 yards out to seal a 2–0 victory away to Cork City at Turners Cross. On 20 July 2025, he scored the second goal in an 8–0 win at home to UCC in the FAI Cup.

=== Drogheda United ===
On 21 November 2025, it was announced that Kavanagh had signed for League of Ireland Premier Division club Drogheda United on a two-year-contract for an undisclosed fee. He scored his first league goal for the club on 27 February 2026, opening the scoring in a 2–1 defeat at home to Shelbourne. He scored 7 goals in 41 appearances in all competitions in 2026, as the club was relegated following a 2–1 defeat to UCD in the Promotion/Relegation Playoff.

== International career ==
Kavanagh was named as part of the squad for the Republic of Ireland U17 team's 2017 UEFA European Under-17 Championship in Croatia. He was also part of the squad for the Republic of Ireland U19 side's 2019 UEFA European Under-19 Championship in Armenia.

On 6 February 2019, he scored the only goal of the game in a 1–0 win for the Republic of Ireland U21 side over the Republic of Ireland Amateur squad. In March 2019 he was called into the Republic of Ireland U21 squad for the first time for a competitive fixture. He made his competitive debut at U21 level on 24 March 2019, in a 3–0 win over Luxembourg U21 at Tallaght Stadium.

== Career statistics ==
As of match played on 8 November 2026

Appearances and goals by club, season and competition
Club	Season	League			National Cup (Note: Includes FAI Cup)		League Cup (Note: Includes League of Ireland Cup)		Europe		Other		Total	
Club	Season	Division	Apps	Goals	Apps	Goals	Apps	Goals	Apps	Goals	Apps	Goals	Apps	Goals
Shamrock Rovers	2018	LOI Premier Division	16	0	1	0	1	0	0 (Note: Appearance(s) in the UEFA Europa League)	0	1 (Note: Appearance(s) in the Leinster Senior Cup)	1	19	1
Shamrock Rovers	2019	LOI Premier Division	22	1	1	0	1	0	0	0	0	0	24	1
Shamrock Rovers	2020	LOI Premier Division	2	0	1	0	—		0	0	—		3	0
Shamrock Rovers	Total		40	1	3	0	2	0	0	0	1	1	46	2
Shamrock Rovers II	2020	LOI First Division	16	9	—		—		—		—		16	9
Bray Wanderers (loan)	2021	LOI First Division	27	6	1	0	—		—		3 (Note: Appearances in the 2021 League of Ireland First Division Playoffs)	1	31	7
Derry City	2022	LOI Premier Division	31	1	5	1	—		1 (Note: Appearance(s) in the UEFA Europa Conference League)	0	—		37	2
Derry City	2023	LOI Premier Division	29	5	2	1	—		5	0	0 (Note: Appearance in the President of Ireland's Cup)	0	36	6
Derry City	Total		60	6	7	2	—		6	0	0	0	73	8
St Patrick's Athletic	2024	LOI Premier Division	34	6	1	0	—		3 (Note: Apprarance(s) in the UEFA Conference League)	0	2 (Note: 1 appearance in the President of Ireland's Cup & 1 appearance, 1 goal in the Leinster Senior Cup)	1	40	7
St Patrick's Athletic	2025	LOI Premier Division	28	2	4	1	—		4	0	6	3	42	6
St Patrick's Athletic	Total		62	8	5	1	—		7	0	8	4	82	13
Drogheda United	2026	LOI Premier Division	35	5	3	1	—		—		3 (Note: 1 appearance in the 2026 League of Ireland play-offs; 2 appearances, 1 goal in the Leinster Senior Cup)	1	41	7
Total			240	35	19	4	2	0	13	0	15	7	289	46

== Honours ==
=== Club ===
Shamrock Rovers

- League of Ireland Premier Division (1): 2020
- FAI Cup (1): 2019

Derry City

- FAI Cup (1): 2022
- President of Ireland's Cup (1): 2023

St Patrick's Athletic

- Leinster Senior Cup (1): 2023–24

=== Individual ===
- PFAI First Division Team of the Year (2): 2020, 2021
