= List of national monuments in County Wicklow =

The Irish state has officially approved the following list of national monuments in County Wicklow. In the Republic of Ireland, a structure or site may be deemed to be a "national monument", and therefore worthy of state protection, if it is of national importance. If the land adjoining the monument is essential to protect it, this land may also be protected.

== National Monuments ==
NM#	Monument name	Description	Image	Townland	Location
137	Aghowle Church	Church & Cross		Aghowle Lower (Shillelagh	52°46′04″N 6°37′13″W
416	Piper's Stones	Stone Circle		Athgreany	53°04′19″N 6°36′46″W
203	Baltinglass Abbey	Abbey (Cistercian)		Baltinglass	52°56′38″N 6°42′35″W
418	Crossoona Rath	Ringfort & Ogham Stone		Boleycarrigeen	52°56′39″N 6°36′51″W
134	Glendalough	Cathedral, Round Tower, Churches, Priory (Augustinian), Crosses, ringfort, hut site & cave		Glendalough	53°00′37″N 6°19′39″W
280	St. Mark's Cross	High Cross		Burgage More	53°09′41″N 6°32′29″W
442	Castleruddery Motte	Motte		Castleruddery Lower	52°59′34″N 6°38′40″W
441	Castleruddery Stone Circle	Stone Circle		Castleruddery Lower	52°59′28″N 6°38′12″W
304	Castletimon Ogham Stone	Ogham Stone		Castletimon	52°54′16″N 6°04′13″W
662	Rath Turtle Moat	Ringfort		Deerpark	53°10′46″N 6°33′28″W
449	Dwyer–McAllister Cottage	House with historical associations		Derrynamuck (Donard)	52°57′44″N 6°33′53″W
337	Fassaroe Cross	Cross		Fassaroe, Bray	53°11′46″N 6°08′26″W
267	Kilcoole Church	Church		Kilcoole	53°06′25″N 6°03′46″W
417	Kilcroney Church	Church		Kilcroney	53°11′10″N 6°08′20″W
323	Kindlestown Castle	Castle		Kindlestown Upper	53°08′28″N 6°05′20″W
419	Lemonstown Motte	Motte		Lemonstown	53°05′07″N 6°39′27″W
368	Moylisha Wedge Tomb	Wedge Tomb		Moylisha	52°45′05″N 6°37′20″W
262	Raheenachluig Church	Church		Newcourt	53°11′38″N 6°05′26″W
328	Rathcoran	Passage Tomb & Hillfort		Coolinarrig Upper, Pinnacle, Tuckmill Hill	52°56′49″N 6°41′00″W
422	Rathgall	Hill Fort		Rath	52°48′08″N 6°39′47″W
317	Seefin Passage Tomb	Passage Tomb		Scurlocksleap	53°11′10″N 6°23′42″W
491	Threecastles Castle	Castle		Threecastles	53°10′54″N 6°29′14″W
531	Tornant Moat	Ringfort & Barrows		Tornant Lower	53°02′43″N 6°42′04″W
135	St. Mary's Church, Downsmill	Church (11th century)		Woodlands	53°07′47″N 6°06′38″W

== Sources ==
- National Monuments in County Wicklow
