= Dunlavin =

Village in County Wicklow, Ireland

Dunlavin Dún Luáin
- Village
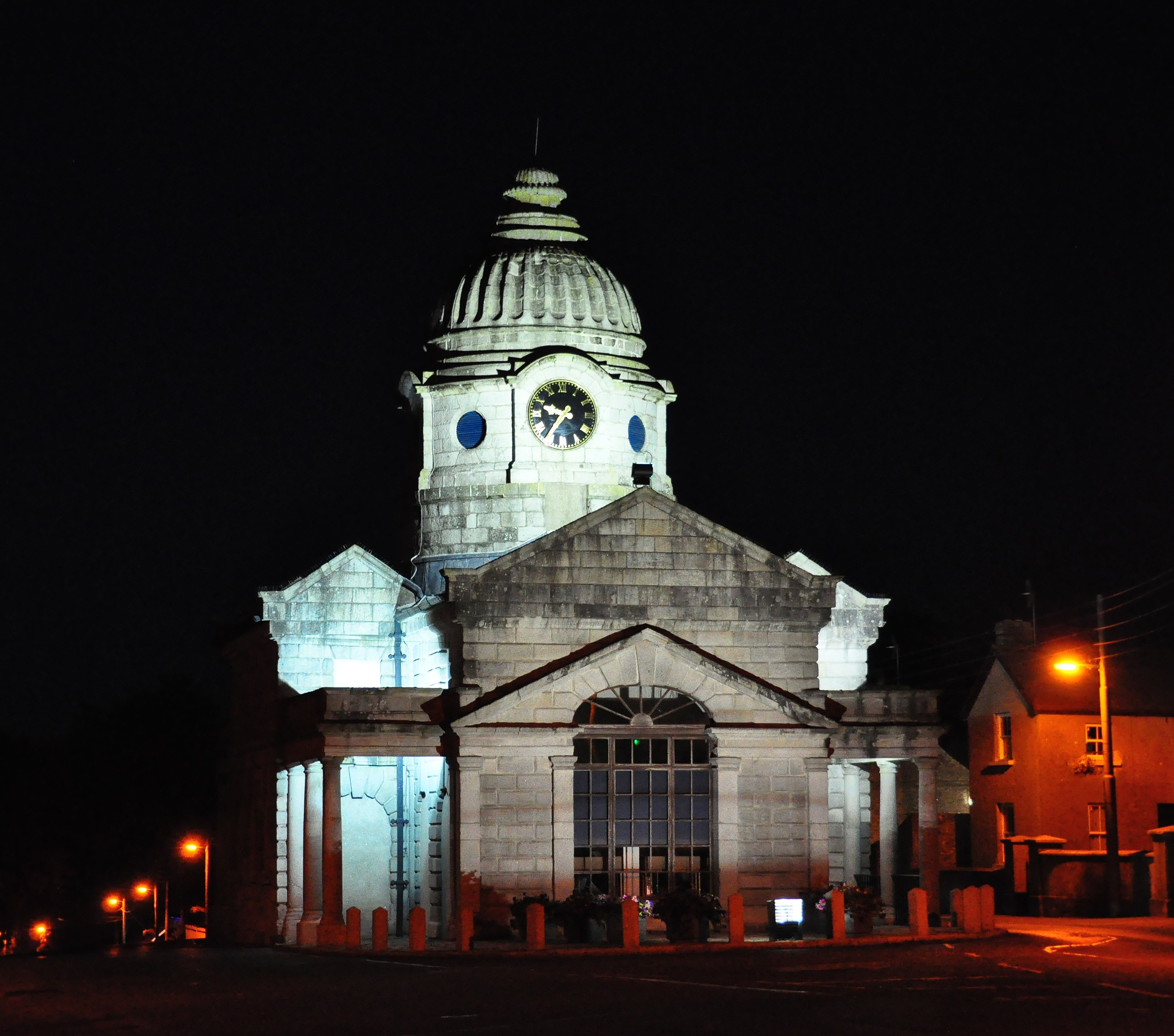
- Dunlavin Market House by night

- Location in Ireland
- Coordinates: 53°03′20″N 6°42′14″W
- Country: Ireland
- Province: Leinster
- County: County Wicklow
- Elevation: 158 m (518 ft)

Population (2022)
  - Total: 1,150
- Time zone: UTC+0 (WET)
  - Summer (DST): UTC-1 (IST (WEST))
- Irish Grid Reference: N868016

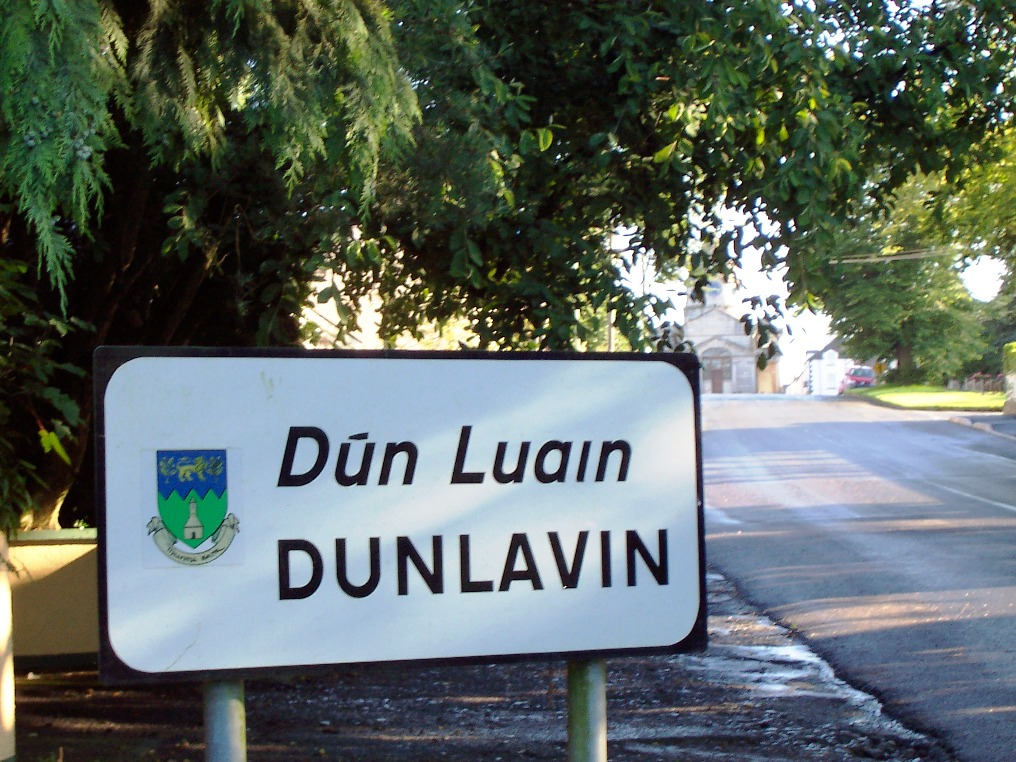
Entering the village

Dunlavin (Irish: Dún Luáin) is a village in County Wicklow, Ireland, situated about 50 kilometres (30 mi) south-west of Dublin. It is centred on the junction of the R412 and R756 regional roads. It was founded around the end of the 17th century and became a prominent town in the area for a time. The village is in a civil parish of the same name.

Rathsallagh House Golf & Country Club and the Wicklow National Park are both nearby. Dunlavin is also close to the Curragh and Punchestown racecourses in County Kildare. Dunlavin's unusually wide streets are characteristic of the village with the Market Square measuring 108 ft across at its widest point. It ranks among the widest village squares in Ireland. The village is known for its Market House, built c.1740, which stands in the centre of the Market Square. The Dunlavin Festival of Arts, which is held each year in late June, has been running since 1982.

== History ==
Evidence of human activity in the area from pre-Celtic times is indicated by the carved boulder known as the Tornant Stone, currently housed in the National Museum of Ireland and nearby Castleruddery Stone Circle.

A previous village at Dunlavin developed on and around the earthen mound at Tornant Moat, which likely dates to the Bronze Age. A Norman ringwork castle was later constructed here. The village was in considerable decline by the late Middle Ages due to attacks from hostile clans such as the O'Tooles and the O'Byrnes in the Wicklow Mountains.

The current settlement of Dunlavin was founded in the late 1650s by the Bulkely family from Cheshire (occasionally and erroneously referred to as "Buckley"). In 1702, Heather Bulkely married James Worth-Tynte and started the long association of the Tynte family with Dunlavin.

By the 18th century, Dunlavin had become a prosperous market town. James Worth-Tynte commissioned architect Richard Cassels to design a Palladian-style market house for the town, which was completed c. 1740.

In 1777, the Dunlavin Light Dragoons were founded as a Volunteer corps, raised to defend Ireland against an enemy invasion.

The Dunlavin Green executions occurred in 1798 when 36 men were shot and others hanged by British Army forces in an attempt to suppress rebellion and membership of the United Irishmen during the 1798 Rebellion. Harsh measures to quell the rebellion in the area greatly affected the local economy, as did the violence and instability that persisted during Michael Dwyer's campaign in the region until 1803.

The Catholic Church (dedicated to Saint Nicholas of Myra) was built on adjacent land donated by the local Tynte family. The church dates from 1815, although Catholic worship was observed on the site before this.

Dunlavin recovered economically after the 1798 Rebellion, leading to a population boom in the first half of the 19th century. This resulted in competition for agricultural land and an ever-increasing dependence on the potato crop. The Tithe War of the 1820s and 1830s in the area also led to unrest and divisions in the community.

The Great Famine severely impacted the population of Dunlavin, with a decline of over 25% in the village during the period 1841–1851.

== Education ==
There are local schools: Jonathan Swift National School (primary, with a Church of Ireland ethos), Scoil Niocláis Naofa (primary, with a Catholic ethos), St Kevin's Community College (secondary and vocational) and a preschool located beside Jonathan Swift National School.

== Historic buildings and places ==
=== Market house ===
The Market House in the centre of the village, built in the Doric style of Grecian architecture, was built c.1740 to designs by Richard Cassels, one of the greatest architects working in Ireland in the 18th century. The landlord of the area, Sir James Worth Tynte, reputedly paid £1,200 for its construction. The building is set on an 'island' that bisects the R412 in the centre of Market Square. For a time, the Market House was the centre of economic activity in the village and surrounding hinterland, making ample use of the generous proportions of the Market Square, which allowed for cattle dealing and trading. The building was temporarily used as a jail during the 1798 Rebellion and later repurposed as a courthouse in the 1830s. The Market House was purchased by Wicklow County Council in 1956. The building was used as a fire station until it was destroyed by fire in 1966. The building was used as a County Council store until it was opened in 1979 in its current capacity as Dunlavin's library.

=== Fairgreen ===
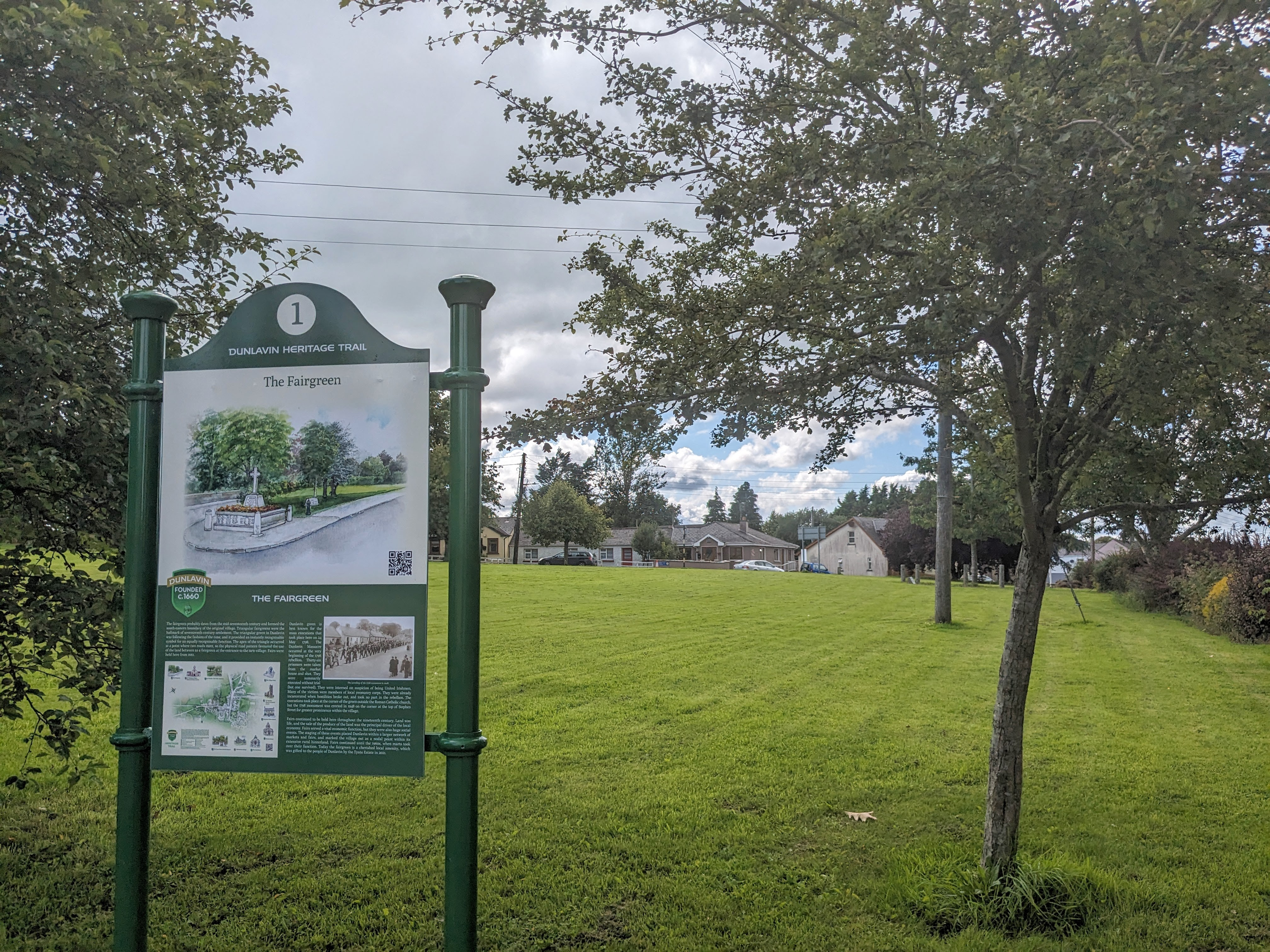
The Fairgreen

Dunlavin Fairgreen is thought to date from the mid-seventeenth century and formed the south-eastern boundary of the original village. Fairs were held in the green from 1661. The area is best known for the Dunlavin Green executions that took place on 24 May 1798 at the beginning of the 1798 Rebellion. Thirty-six prisoners were taken from the Market House and summarily executed on the green without trial. Up to nine others were also hanged from the pillars of the Market House. The majority of the corpses were not claimed or removed on the day of the massacre and were taken to the nearby location of Tournant that evening and buried in a large pit. Fairs continued on the green until the 1960s, when cattle marts took over the principal function of fairs in rural Irish society. The Tynte Estate gifted the Fairgreen to the people of Dunlavin in 2021.

=== St Nicholas's holy well ===
A holy well exists on the slopes of Tornant moat to the south of the village and is dedicated to Saint Nicholas. 'Patterns' were the name of rituals that were routinely performed by pilgrims when visiting such sites and involved walking a prescribed circular clockwise journey around a holy well. The "Tournant pattern" at St Nicholas's holy well was traditionally held in late June each year. Patterns became social occasions, with music, singing, dancing, alcohol, festivities and fighting involved. A major renovation project in 2016 saw a waymarked path installed across the fields to grant access to the well from the side of St Kevin's Community College. The well was also refurbished, and a new mass rock tar was installed.

=== Tornant moat ===
Tornant, or Tournant, moat is a National Monument composed of a ringfort and nearby barrows located 1.3 km south of the town. The name derives from the Irish tor neannta, "nettle mound." The mound marks the site of a large rath, probably dating from the Bronze Age. Later, the Normans built a ringwork castle on the site around which the first Dunlavin village settlement grew. Scenic views of West Wicklow can be enjoyed from the top of the moat.

=== Tournant graveyard ===
There is a graveyard adjacent to the site of Tornant moat, where the majority of the victims of the 1798 Dunlavin Green massacre were interred. In September 2021, a monument was erected at the site of the mass grave, which provides information about the 1798 massacre and contains a listing of all the names of those who were executed on the day.

== Transport ==
=== Rail ===
Dunlavin railway station opened on 22 June 1885, as part of the line from Sallins to Tullow. It closed to passengers on 27 January 1947 and to goods traffic on 10 March 1947, and closed completely on 1 April 1959 along with the rest of the line. The station building is now a private residence.

=== Road ===
Classic and vintage motor enthusiasts are catered to by the West Wicklow Classic & Vintage Vehicles Club. The scenic R756 road leads from Dunlavin to Glendalough, crossing the Wicklow Gap.

=== Bus ===
As of July 2022, the town is served by three separate Local Link public bus routes: the 1400b,1410, and 5030. The 1400b links Dunlavin with the nearby village of Donard and Newbridge, County Kildare , once a week on a Saturday. The 1410 links the village to Castledermot, Carlow and Baltinglass once a week on a Friday. The 5030 links the village to Baltinglass once a week on a Saturday evening, taking in the neighbouring villages of Donard, Stratford-on-Slaney and Grangecon and returns later in the night.

As of July 2022, the nearest Dublin Bus stop from which to reach Dublin city centre is in the town of Ballymore Eustace, 11 km north of Dunlavin. Route number 65 runs four times daily (Monday-Friday), seven times (Saturday), and six times (Sunday). From Ballymore Eustace, the 65 takes approximately 1 hour 30 minutes, depending on traffic, and terminates in the city centre at Poolbeg Street.

As of July 2022, the village is not served by any Bus Éireann route.

== People ==
- Bill Bowder, served as Rector of Donoughmore, Donard and Dunlavin.
- Sir Richard Bulkeley, 1st Baronet, politician, baronet of Old Bawn and Dunlaven (1672-1685).
- Sir Richard Bulkeley, 2nd Baronet, politician, baronet of Old Bawn and Dunlaven (1685-1710).
- Conor Carty, Irish footballer, from Dunlavin.
- Raymond Daniels, Wicklow Gaelic footballer (1979–2008) from Dunlavin.
- Mark Deering, farmer, rugby football player, and Fine Gael politician, from Dunlavin.
- James Fenton, Irish-born Australian farmer and writer, was born in Dunlavin.
- Helen Kearney, Paralympic equestrian, from Dunlavin.
- Chris Lawlor, historian, from Dunlavin.
- Neal O'Raw, Rector of Donoughmore and Donard with Dunlavin.
- Edward Pennefather, barrister, Law Officer and judge, lived in Rathsallagh House, Dunlavin.
- Leslie Rowan, British civil servant and industrialist, was born in Dunlavin.
- John Francis Shearman, the historian served as a curate in Dunlavin and researched early Christian relics around Dunlavin.
- Sir James Stratford Tynte, 1st Baronet, Baronet of Dunlaven (1778-1785).
- Robert Warke, Rector of Dunlavin (1964–67).

== See also ==
- List of towns and villages in Ireland
- Market Houses in Ireland
