= James Fenton (disambiguation) =

James Fenton (born 1949) is a British poet (in English), journalist and literary critic.

James Fenton may also refer to:

- James Fenton (farmer) (1820–1901), Irish-born Australian, also non-fiction writer
- James Fenton (Ulster Scots poet) (born 1931), British, writing in his dialect
- James Fenton (engineer) (1815–1863), Scottish born mechanical engineer
- James Fenton (politician) (1864–1950), Australian politician
- James Fenton (1754–1834), financial partner in Fenton, Murray and Jackson
