= Park Bridge (disambiguation) =

Park Bridge is an area of Ashton-under-Lyne, Greater Manchester, England.

Park Bridge may also refer to:

- Park Bridge railway station, Greater Manchester
- Park Bridge (British Columbia), a highway bridge
- Park Bridge, Aberdeenshire, a pedestrian and cycle bridge
- Parkbridge, a village in County Wicklow, Ireland
