= Albert Frazer =

Albert Frazer was a 20th-century Irish Anglican priest.

Frazer was educated at Trinity College Dublin. He was ordained deacon in 1938 and priest in 1939. After a curacy in Belfast he held incumbencies at Donoughmore and Rathdrum. He was Archdeacon of Glendalough from 1959 to 1985.
