= Lemonstown Motte =

Norman motte in Wicklow, Ireland

- Móta Bhaile an Leamóntaigh (Irish)
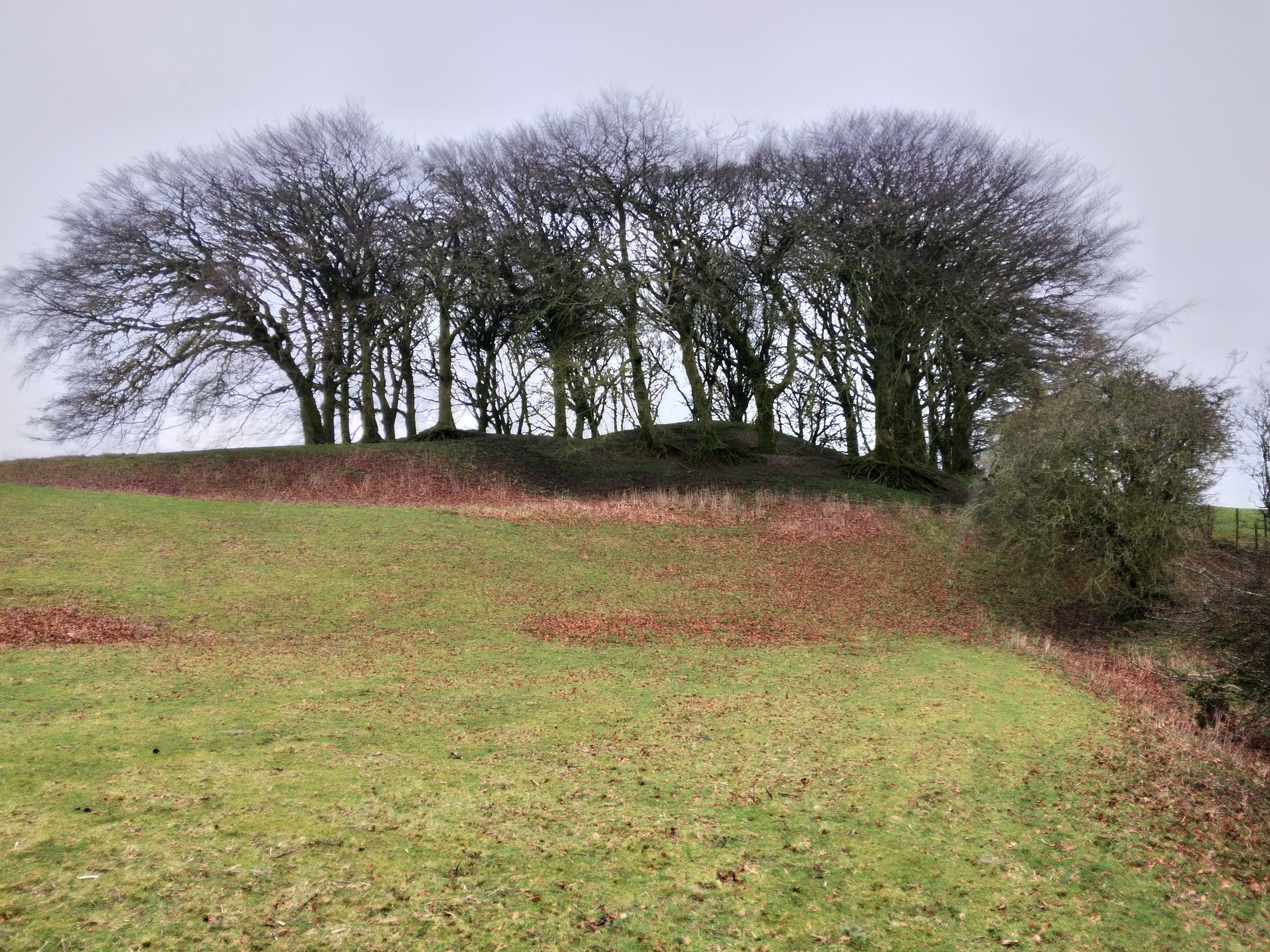

- Location within Ireland
- 53.085262°N 6.657435°W
- Type: motte
- Cultures: Hiberno-Norman
- Location: Lemonstown, Dunlavin, County Wicklow, Ireland
- Region: Wicklow Mountains

History
- Built: 12th/13th century

Site notes
- Material: earth
- Elevation: 256 m (840 ft)
- Height: 7.6 m (25 ft)
- Area: 0.18 ha (0.44 acres)
- Diameter: 12 m (39 ft)
- Owner: private

National monument of Ireland
- Official name: Lemonstown Motte
- Reference no.: 419

Lemonstown Motte is a motte and National Monument located in County Wicklow, Ireland.

== Location ==
Lemonstown Motte is located halfway between Dunlavin and Hollywood. The Toor Brook flows 1.8 km (1.1 mi) to the east.

== History ==
The motte was built in the Norman period, i.e. the 12th or 13th century AD.

== Description ==
Lemonstown Motte is round, 12 m (39 ft) in diameter, with an entrance to the north.

== Gallery ==
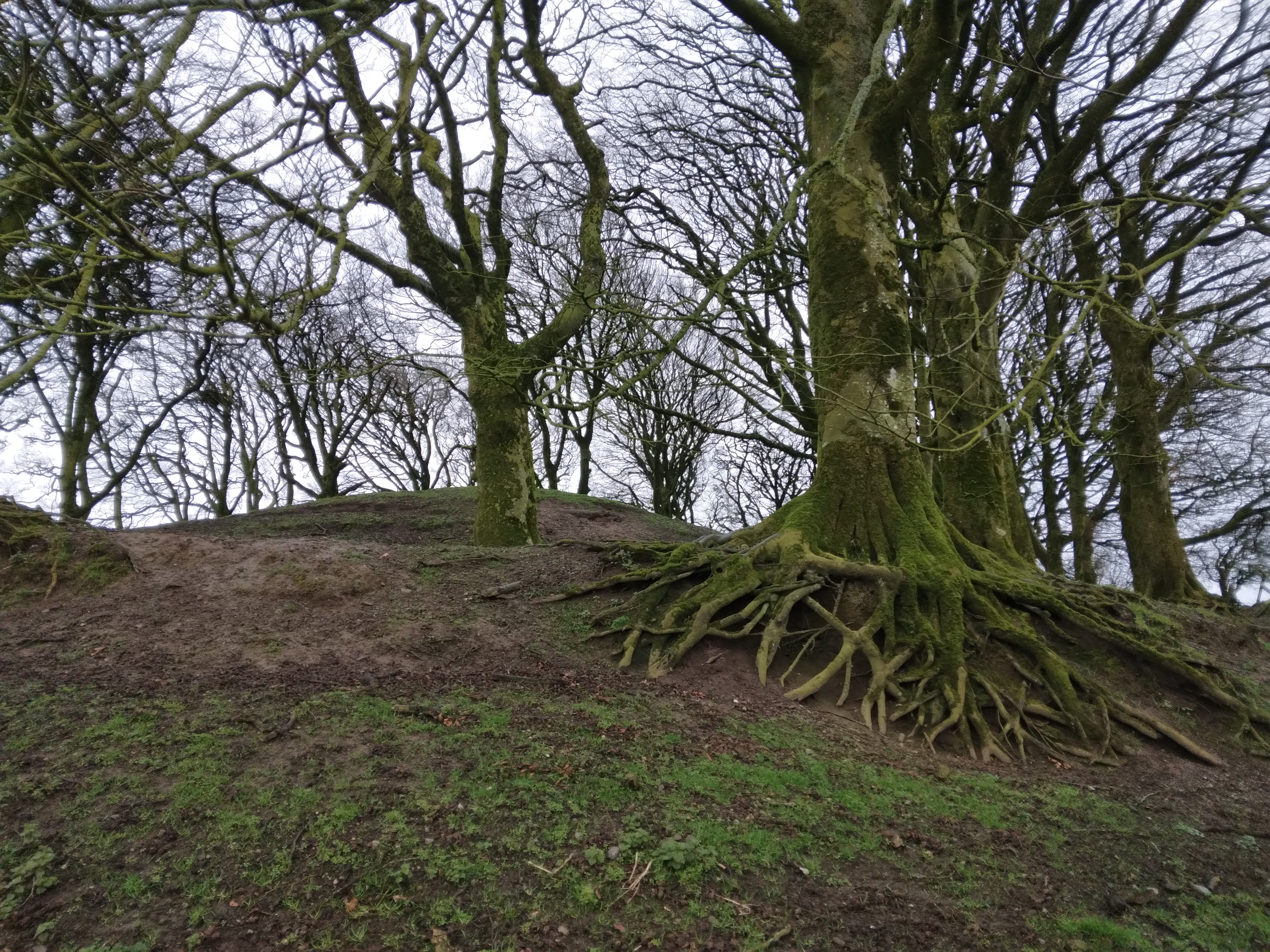
Northern embankments of the motte

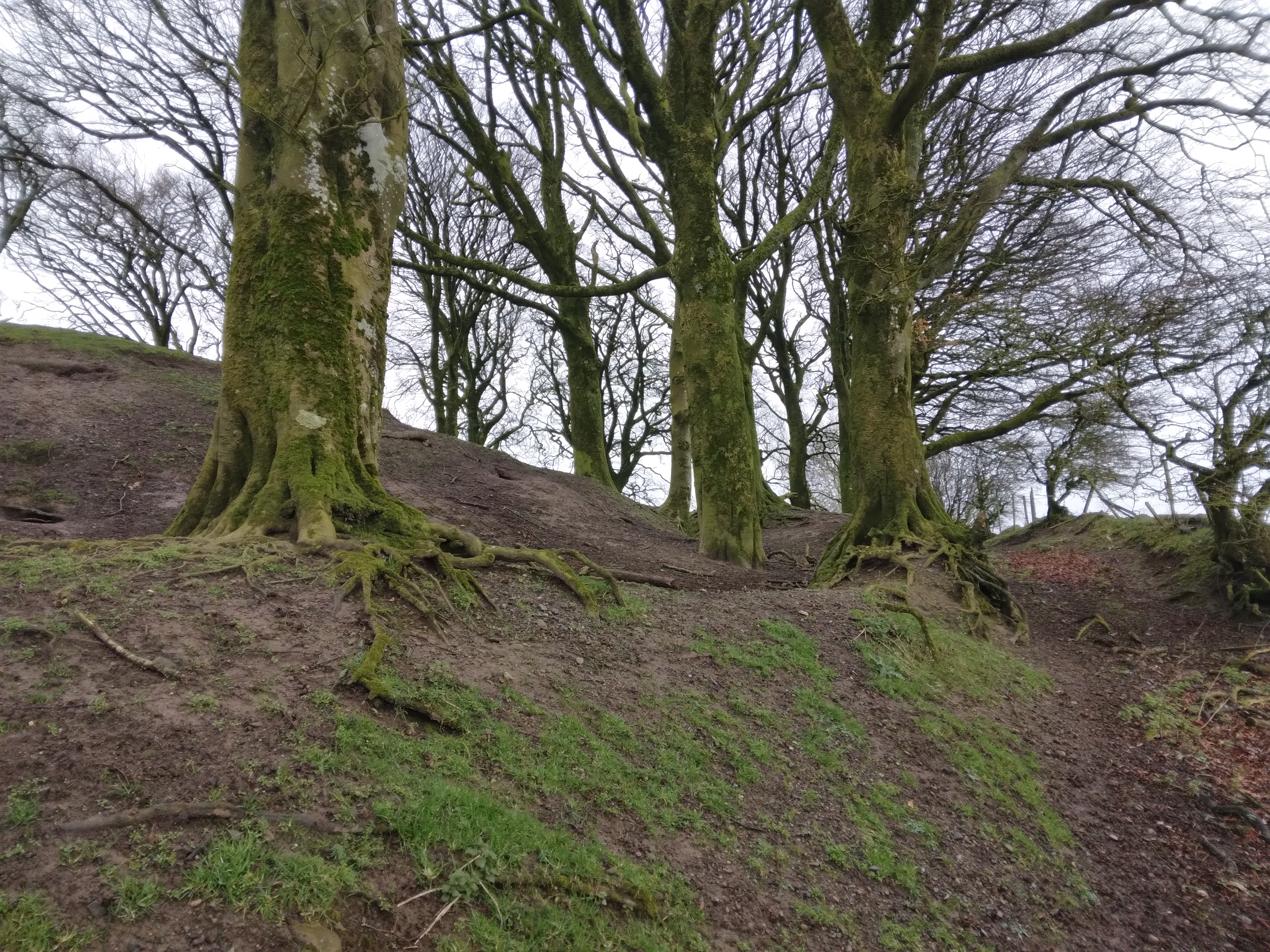
Northern embankments of the motte

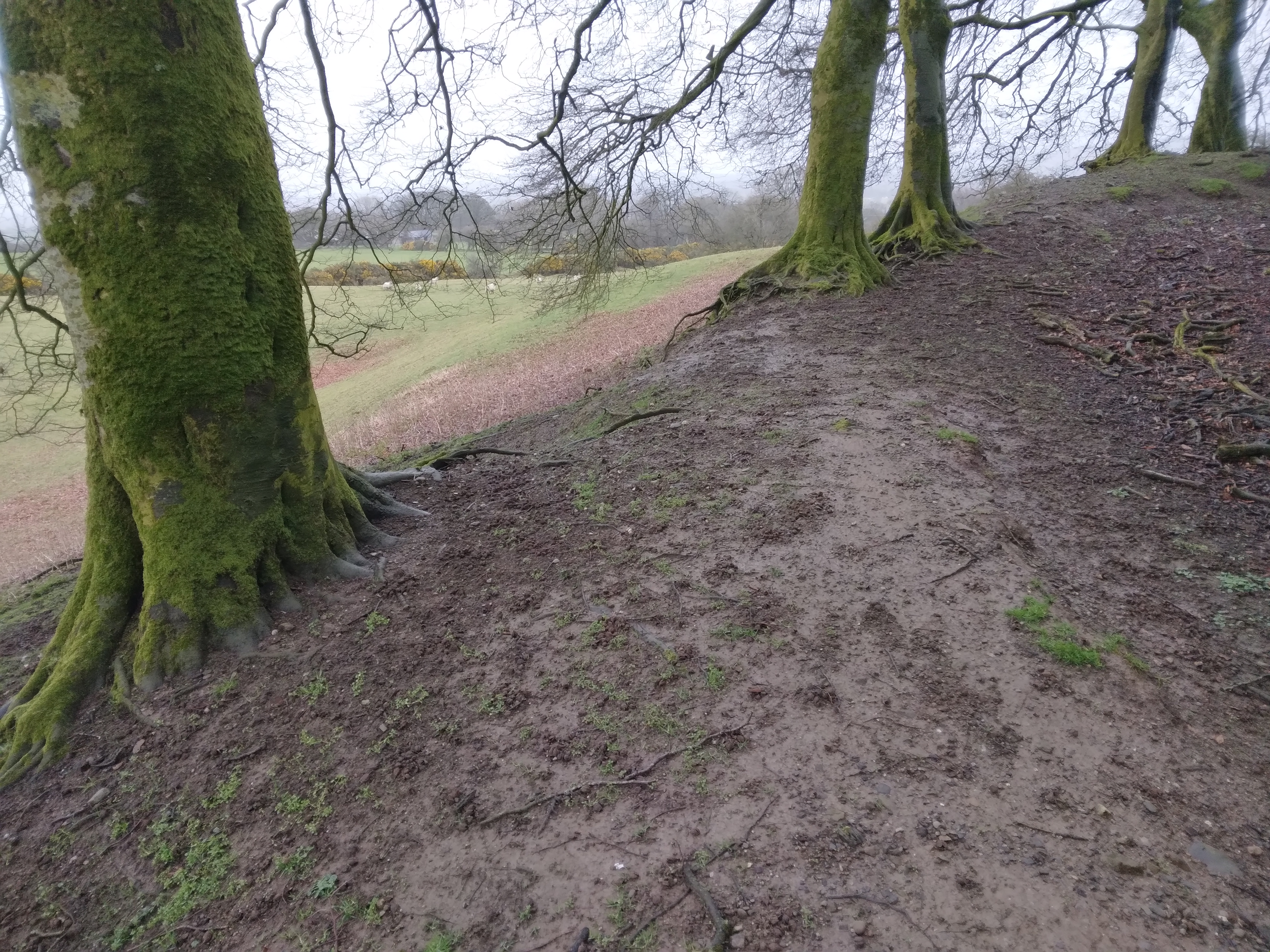
Facing north-east

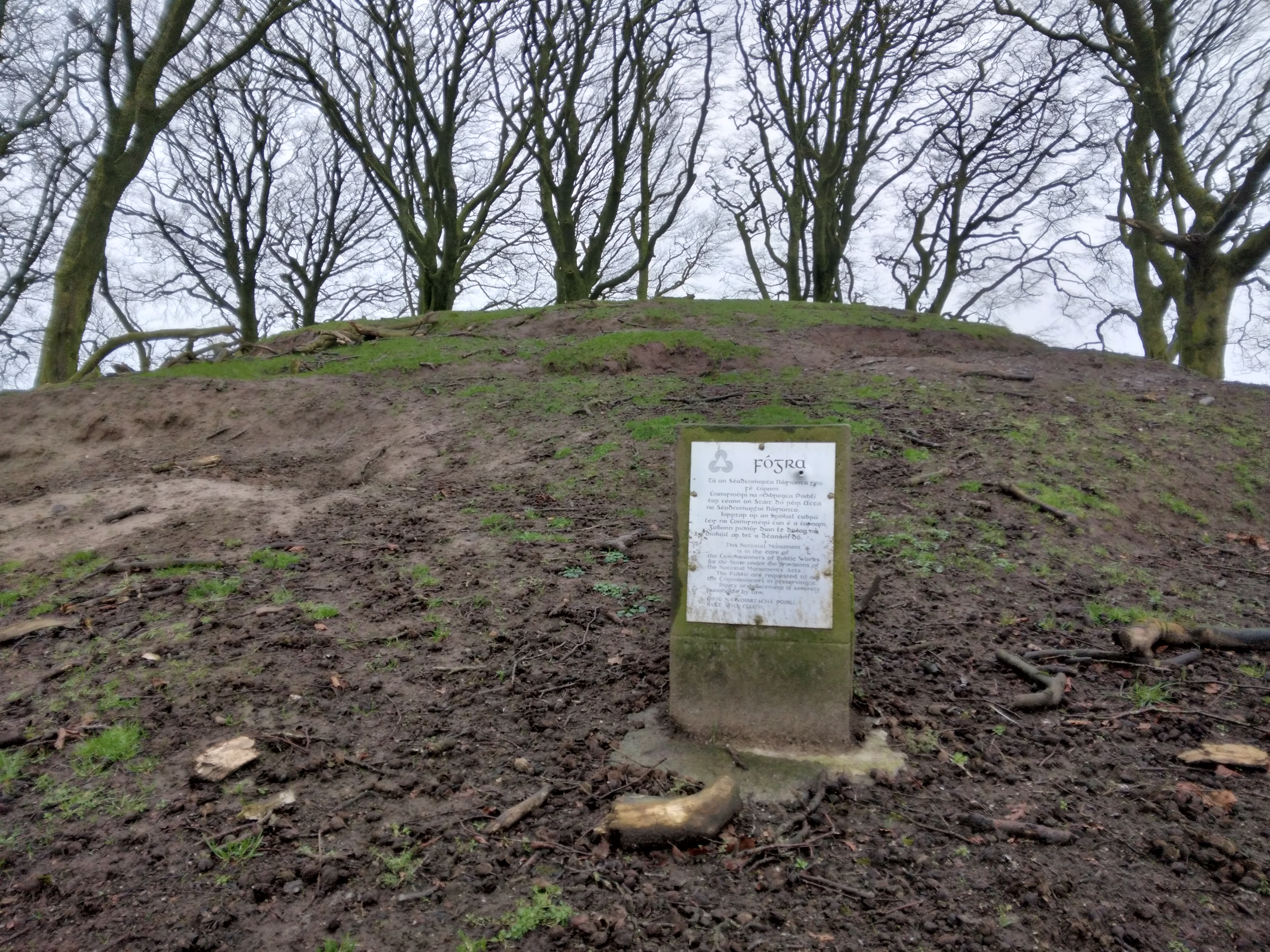
A standard notice (Irish: fógra) at the National Monument.

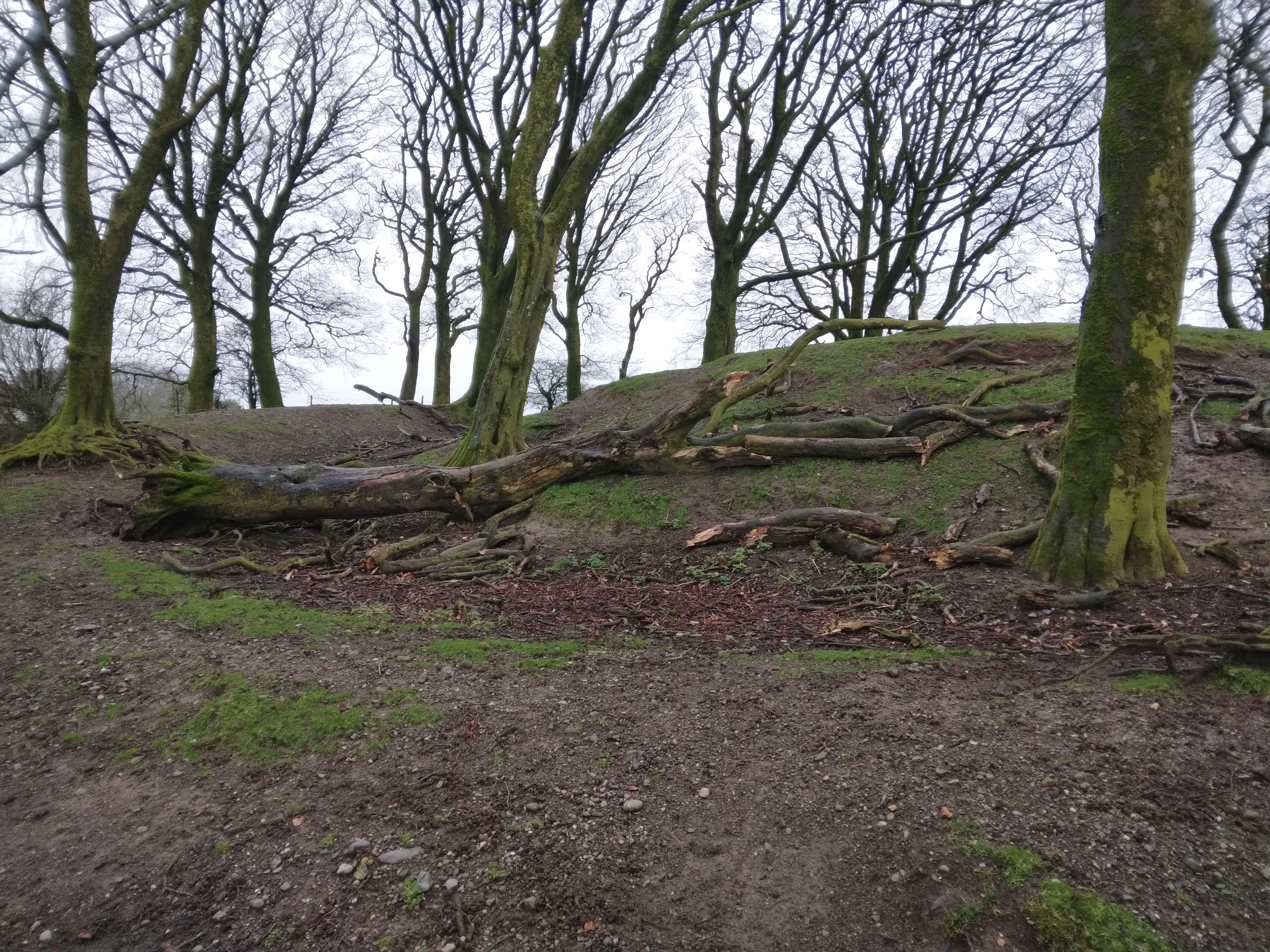
View of the inner mound

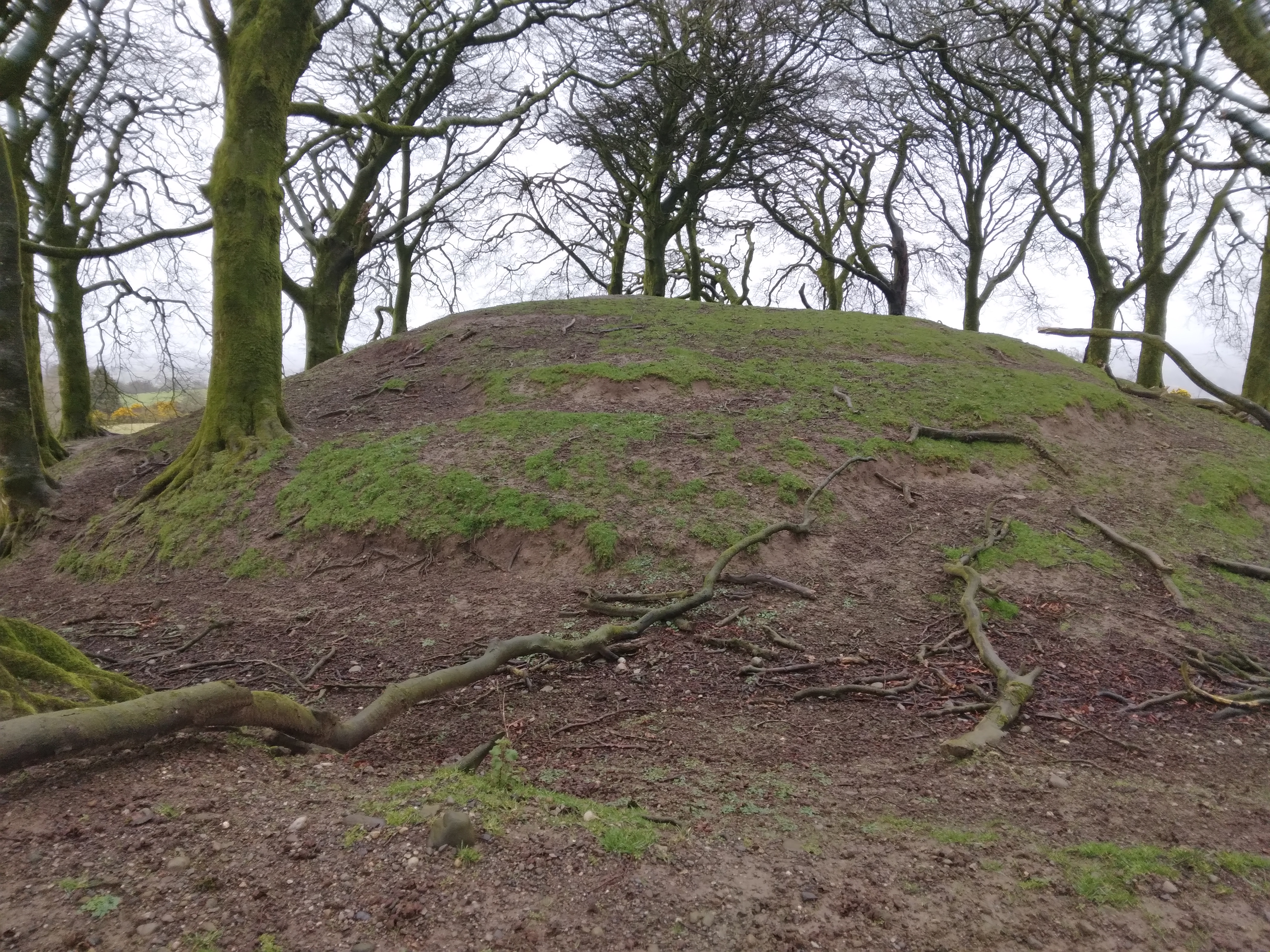
View of the inner mound

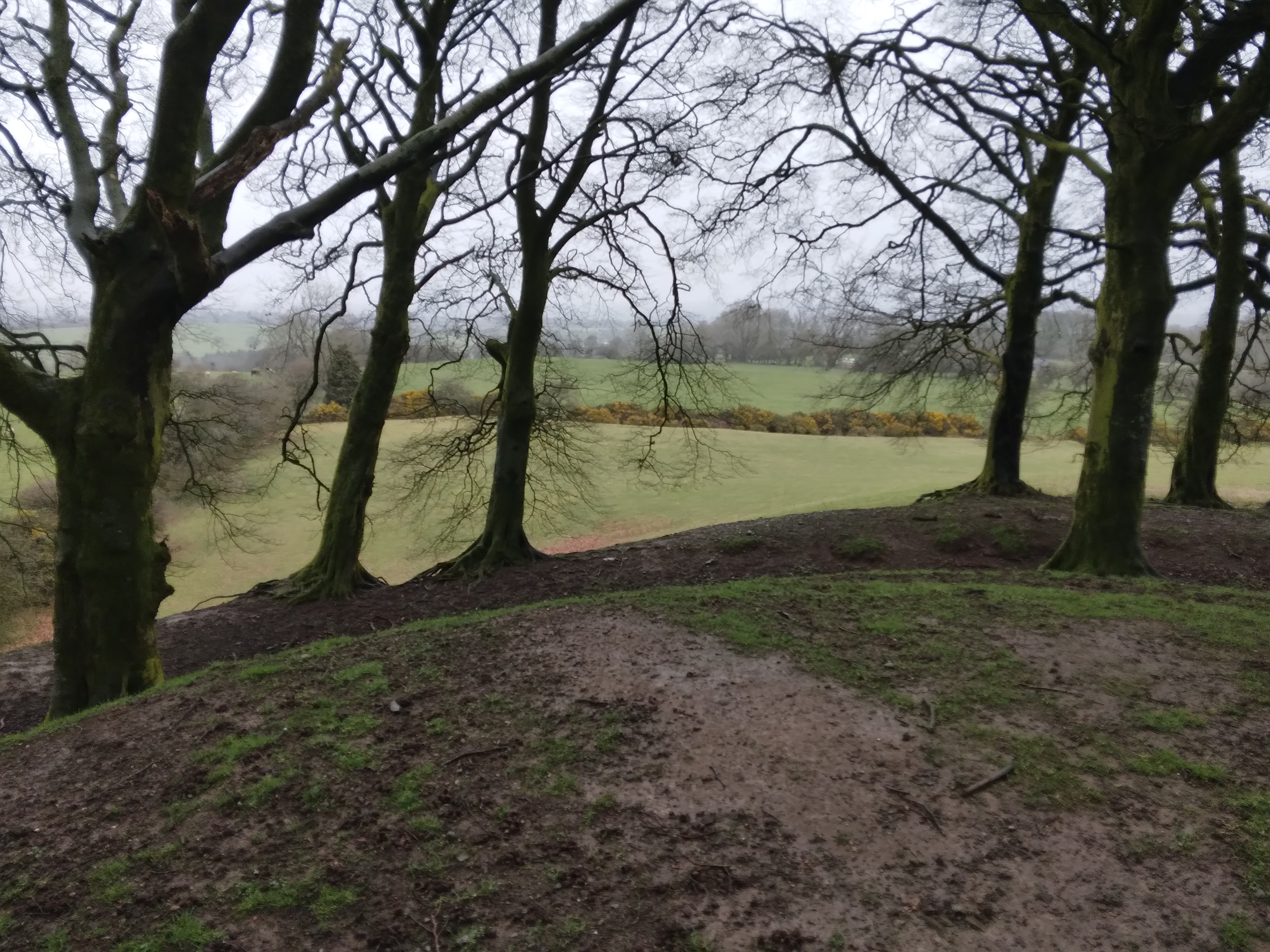
Facing north from the summit of the inner mound

== See also ==
- List of National Monuments in County Wicklow
