= Conaing Ua Cearbhaill =

11th-century Irish priest

Conaing Ua Cearbhaill was an Irish priest in the early 11th century: the first recorded Archdeacon of Glendalough.
