= John Francis Shearman =

John Francis Shearman (1831–1885) was an Irish priest, antiquarian and historian.

Born in Kilkenny in 1831, he studied at Maynooth College and was ordained in 1862. He was posted to serve as a curate in Dunlavin, and researched early Christian relics around Dunlavin. Shearman moved to Howth, near Dublin. In 1883 he was appointed parish priest in Moone, County Kildare, where he died in 1885, and is buried in the chapel.

Shearman's manuscripts are held in the archives in Maynooth University.

== Publications ==
- Loca Patriciana by Shearman, John Francis, (1879)
