= Coláiste Chraobh Abhann =

Secondary school in Kilcoole, County Wicklow, Ireland

Coordinates: 53.1002°N 6.0645°W

Location
- Creowen; Kilcoole, County Wicklow; Ireland

Information
- School type: Secondary school
- Years: First through sixth
- Gender: Mixed
- Age range: 12-19
- Website: www.colaisteca.ie

Coláiste Chraobh Abhann (English: 'the college of a branch over a river') is a community secondary school in Kilcoole, County Wicklow, Ireland. It is owned and run by the Kildare and Wicklow Education and Training Board. It was built in 2003 and had grown to 550 students by 2008 and 174 by March 2025.

Students at the school sit the Junior Certificate syllabus for their first three years at the school, and the Leaving Certificate syllabus for their last two, with the option of Transition Year between.

== Alumni ==
- Mason Melia (b. 2007) - professional footballer
