= St. Mary's Church, Downsmill =

St. Mary's Church, Downshill
- Woodlands Church
- Eaglais Fhearann na Coille
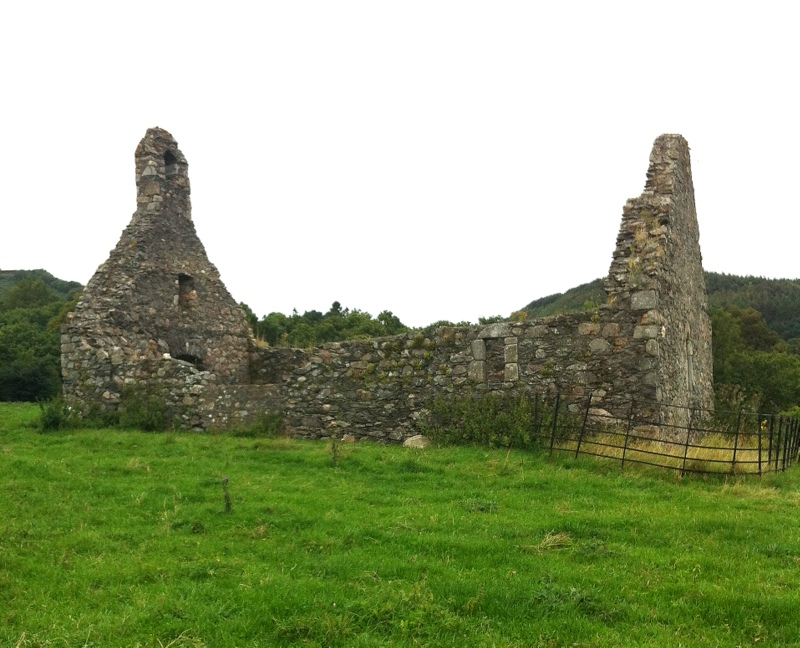

- Location within Ireland
- 53.129708°N 6.110617°W
- Location: Woodlands, Kilcoole, County Wicklow
- Country: Ireland
- Denomination: Pre-Reformation Catholic

History
- Founded: 15th century
- Dedication: Mary, mother of Jesus

Architecture
- Style: Celtic Christianity
- Years built: 15th century

Specifications
- Length: 14 m (46 ft)
- Width: 7.5 m (25 ft)
- Height: 5 m (16 ft)
- Materials: granite, limestone

Administration
- Diocese: Glendalough

National monument of Ireland
- Official name: Downshill
- Reference no.: 135

St. Mary's Church, Downshill, also called Woodlands Church, is a medieval church and National Monument in the Glen of the Downs, County Wicklow, Ireland.

== Location ==
St. Mary's Church is located 1.2 km (¾ mile) west of Delgany, in the southern part of the Glen of the Downs.

== History ==
St. Mary's Church is dated to the 11th century AD, but there is little to no evidence for this. Other sources place its construction in the 15th century.

The church was restored in 1906 and the baptismal font inside the door set into place.

== Church ==
St. Mary's is a nave and chancel church, with a bell-cote in the west. The doorway has two bevelled granite jambs. The east wall has an arched window, with the south and north having opposing flat arch windows.
