= Moylisha Wedge Tomb =

- Leaba na Saidhe
- Labbanasighe
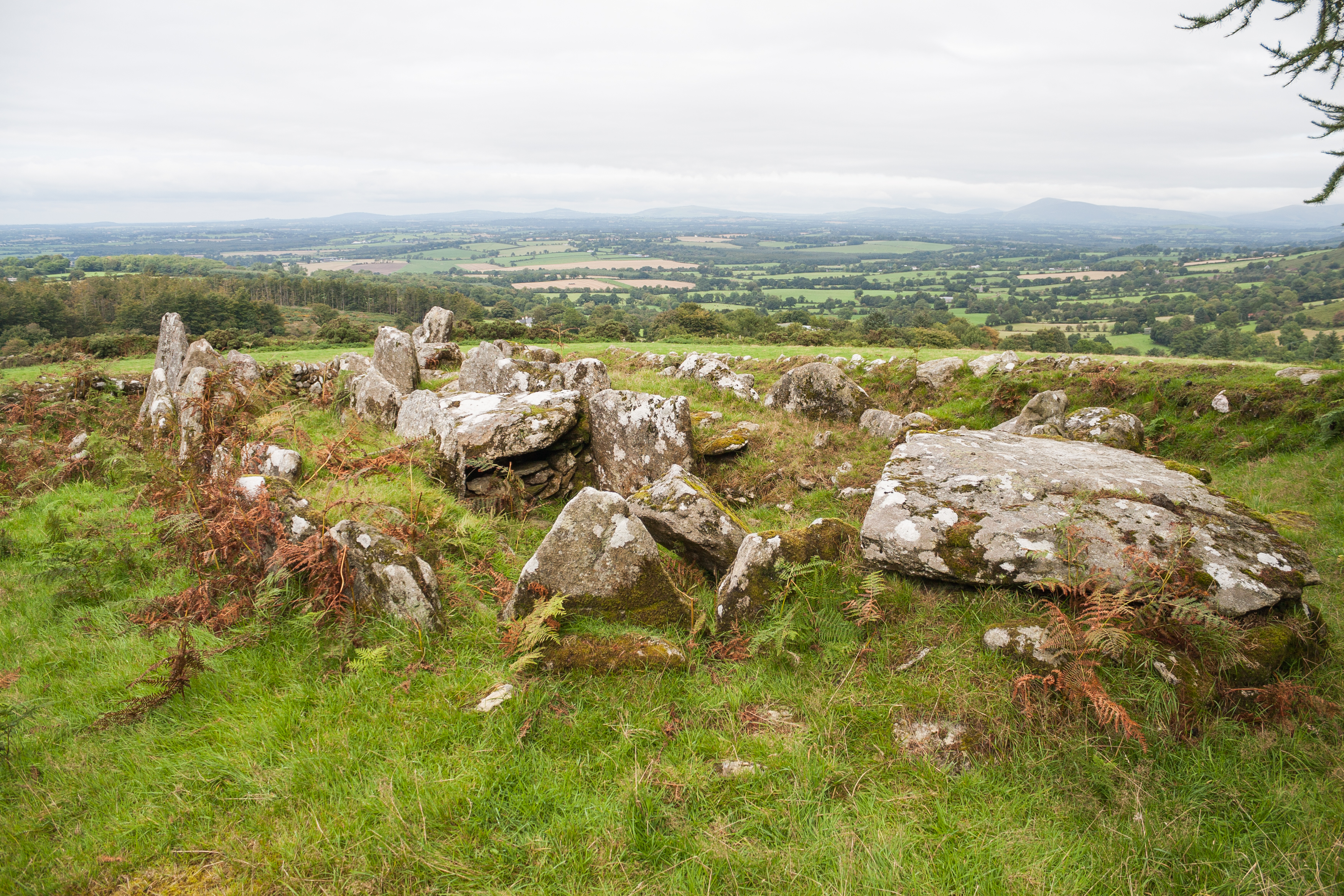
- The site in 2016

- Location in Ireland
- 52.7514°N 6.622294°W
- Type: Gallery grave
- Location: Wicklow, Ireland

History
- Built: c. 1650 BC

Site notes
- Material: Stone
- Height: 1.5 m (4 ft 11 in)

National monument of Ireland
- Official name: Moylisha
- Reference no.: 368

The Moylisha Wedge Tomb, also called Labbanasighe, is a wedge-shaped gallery grave and National Monument located in County Wicklow, Ireland.

== Location ==
Moylisha Wedge Tomb is located on the north face of Moylisha Hill, 6.1 km (3.8 mi) west of Shillelagh.

== History ==
The Moylisha Wedge Tomb was constructed c. 2300–1000 BC, i.e. the Copper Age or Bronze Age. The old name "Labbanasighe" is from Irish leaba na saidhe, meaning "Bed of the Bitch" (i.e. female dog). The name might also mean "Labbanasaighde" which translates as "Bed of the Arrow / Shaft" which may be evidenced through finds from archaeological digs. Local folklore in Parkbridge explains the origins of the name differently - in the local area the phonetics are pronounced like "Lob-na-Sy (Síthe)" which is said to mean "Bed of the Fairies". The site was excavated in 1937 by Gearóid Ó h-Iceadha and potsherds, some cremated bone and two stone disks were found. Also found were two valves of a sandstone mould for lozenge-bladed socket-looped spearheads.

== Description ==
Moylisha Wedge Tomb consists of a rectangular cairn 13 × 10 meters incorporating a gallery 7.5 meters in length aligned NW–SE. The gallery consists of a small antechamber separated by a low sill from the main chamber 6 m in length which widens toward the southeast. A single displaced roofstone lies in the gallery.
