= Rath Turtle Moat =

Ringfort in Wicklow, Ireland

- Ráth Torcaill (Irish)
- Rathturtle Moat
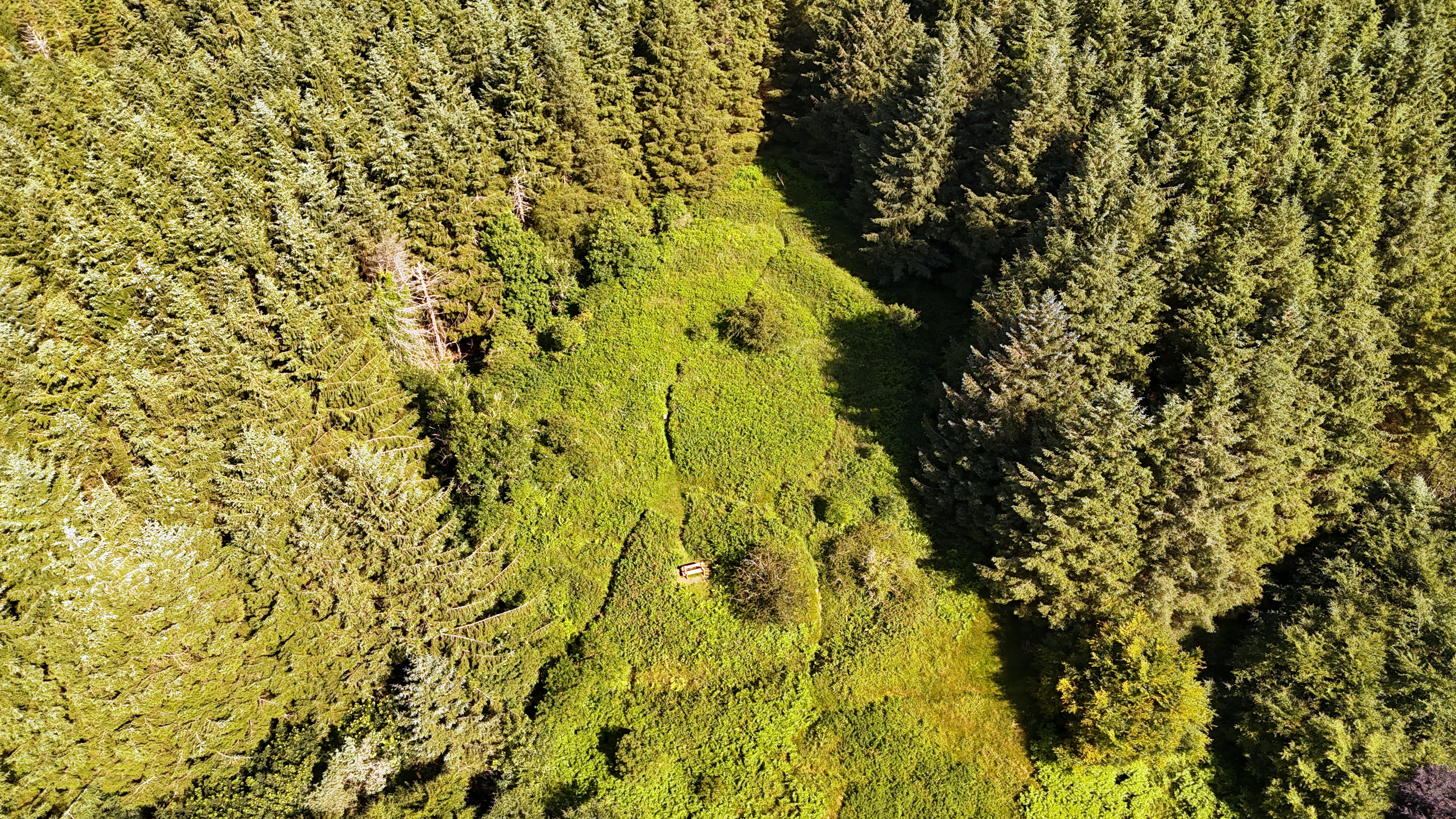
- Aerial photo of Rath Turtle Moat

- Location within Ireland
- 53°10′46″N 6°33′28″W
- Type: ringwork
- Cultures: Anglo-Norman
- Location: Glen Ding, Blessington, County Wicklow, Ireland
- Region: Wicklow Mountains

History
- Built: 12th century AD
- Built by: Anglo-Normans

Site notes
- Material: earth
- Elevation: 286 m (938 ft)
- Length: 49 m (161 ft)
- Width: 36 m (118 ft)
- Area: 0.55 ha (1.4 acres)
- Owner: private

National monument of Ireland
- Official name: Rathturtle
- Reference no.: 662

Rath Turtle Moat is a ringwork and National Monument located in County Wicklow, Ireland.

== Location ==
Rath Turtle Moat is located in Glen Ding Wood, 1.6 km (0.99 mi) northwest of Blessington, overlooking the River Liffey reservoir and near the source of the Morell River.

== History ==
The site is believed to derive its name from the Meic Torcaill, a leading Norse-Gaelic family in 12th-century Dublin. The same name is found in that of the townland of Curtlestown (Irish: Baile mhic Torcaill), located west of Powerscourt. The site later came under Norman control. Ringworks like that at Rath Turtle were built during the earliest phase of the Norman conquest of Ireland. They usually had a wooden gate tower, with a stone-lined causewayed entrance and stone-lined banks topped by a wooden palisade. The site has been recognised by the OPW as one of "great historical importance" following an archaeological study of the area.

== Description ==
The ringwork is ovoid and consists of a raised central area enclosed by a high earthen bank, an external fosse and an external bank. The entrance is to the south has a causeway across the ditch.

== See also ==
- List of National Monuments in County Wicklow
