= Kilcroney Church =

- Cill Chróine
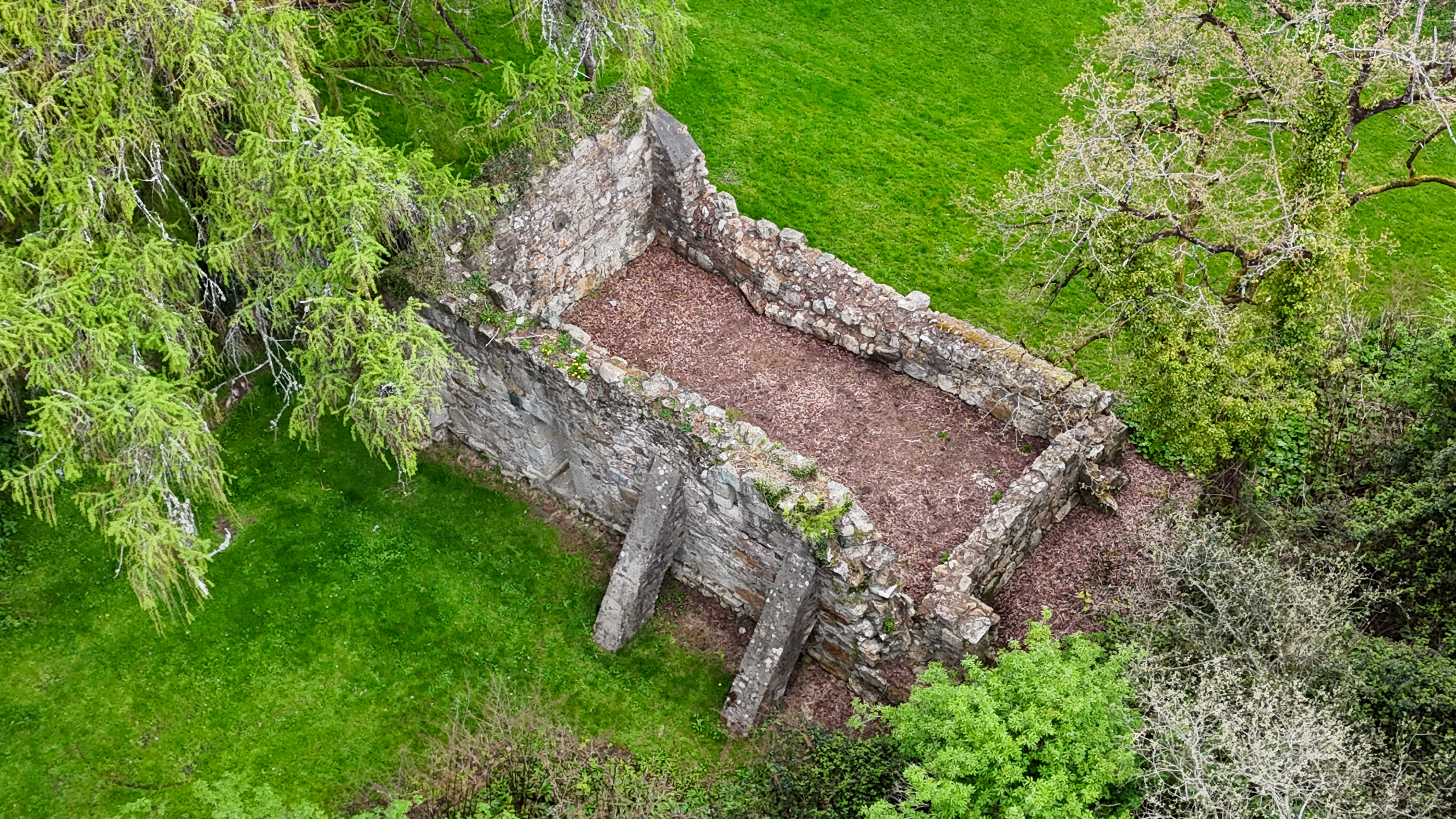

- Location within Ireland
- 53°11′10″N 6°08′20″W
- Location: Kilcroney, Kilmacanogue, County Wicklow
- Country: Ireland
- Denomination: Pre-Reformation Catholic

History
- Founded: 11th century
- Dedication: Saint Cróine

Architecture
- Style: Celtic Christianity
- Years built: 11th century

Specifications
- Length: 12.12 m (39.8 ft)
- Width: 7.8 m (26 ft)
- Height: 4 m (13 ft)
- Materials: sandstone, granite, shale

Administration
- Diocese: Glendalough

National monument of Ireland
- Official name: Kilcroney
- Reference no.: 417

Kilcroney Church is a medieval church and National Monument in County Wicklow, Ireland.

== Location ==
Kilcroney Church is located in woodland on the western edge of Bray, to the south of the River Dargle.

== History ==
There may have been an earlier wooden church on the site, dedicated to Saint Cróine, an obscure female saint of the 5th century.

The stone church was built in the 11th century, and the pre-Norman patrons were either the Uí Briuin Cualann or the Ó Ceallaigh of Uí Teigh. In the Norman period, Kilcroney is mentioned in records of 1280, 1285 and 1305. It later returned to Gaelic Irish possession when the Ó Tuathail (O'Tooles) took over the area.

In 1533, it was mentioned that Kilcroney was a chapel of the larger local church at Stagonyll (Powerscourt). Other records claim it was a possession of St. Mary's Abbey, Dublin.

The church was extended in the late medieval period, and in the modern period there has been some restoration, with the walls being propped up.

== Church ==
The church is rectangular in shapewith walls of sandstone, granite and shale blocks. The southern wall holds a granite lintel and round-headed window.
