= Neal O'Raw =

Neal John O'Raw has been the Church of Ireland Archdeacon of Glendalough since 2018.

O'Raw was ordained in 2003. After a curacy at Killala Cathedral he held incumbencies at Crossmolina and Donoughmore.
