= Mason Melia =

Irish footballer (born 2007)

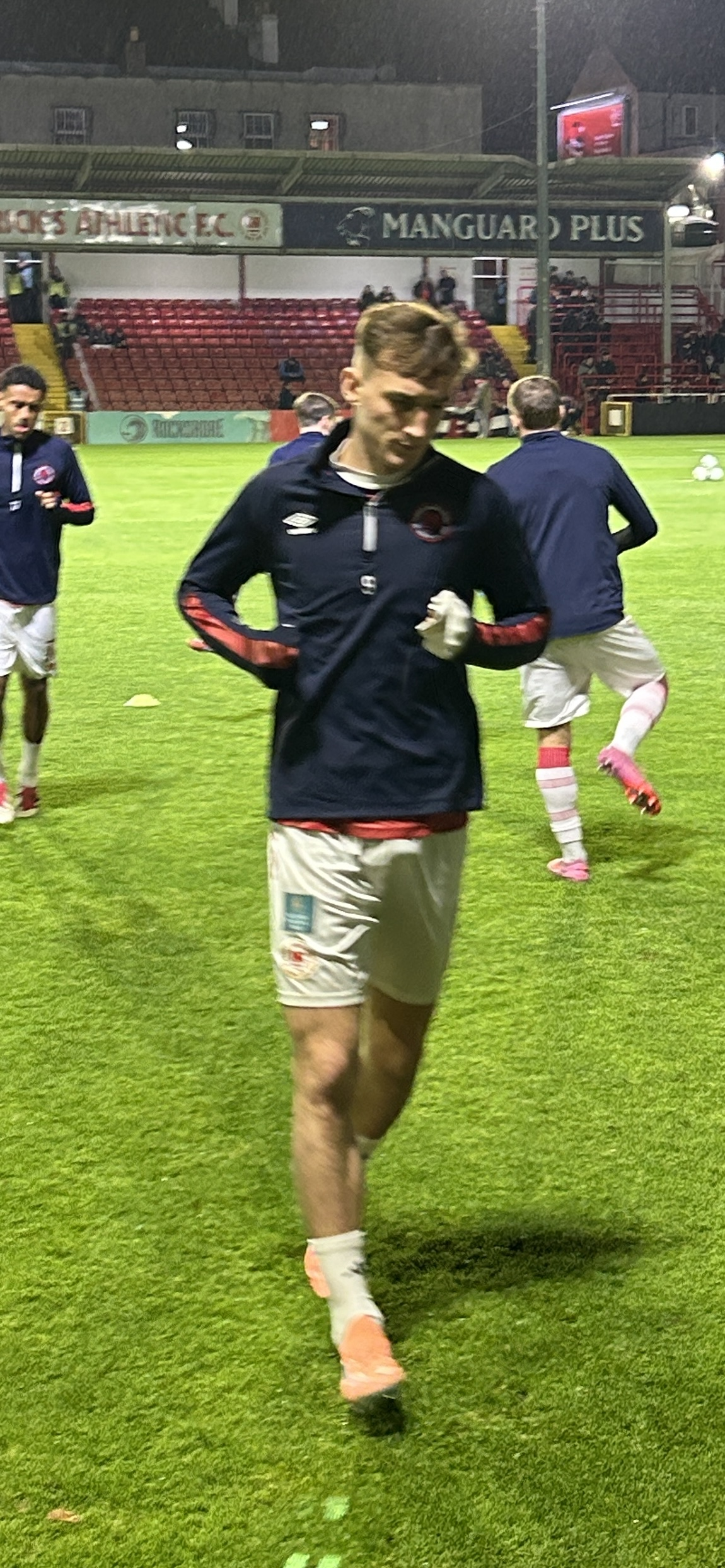
- Melia during a pre-match warmup with St Patrick's Athletic in 2025

Personal information
- Date of birth: 22 September 2007 (age 19)
- Place of birth: Newtownmountkennedy, County Wicklow, Ireland
- Position: Forward

Team information
- Current team: Lincoln City (on loan from Tottenham Hotspur)
- Number: 10

Youth career
- 2013–2019: Newtown Juniors
- 2019–2022: St Joseph's Boys
- 2022: Bray Wanderers
- 2022–2023: St Patrick's Athletic

Senior career*
Years	Team	Apps	(Gls)
2023–2025	St Patrick's Athletic	76	(21)
2026–	Tottenham Hotspur	0	(0)
2026–	→ Lincoln City (loan)	2	(0)

International career^{‡}
2021	Republic of Ireland U15	6	(0)
2022–2023	Republic of Ireland U16	6	(2)
2022–2024	Republic of Ireland U17	22	(10)
2023–2024	Republic of Ireland U19	4	(1)
2025–	Republic of Ireland U21	6	(3)
2026–	Republic of Ireland	2	(0)
- * Club domestic league appearances and goals as of 21:00, 1 September 2026 (UTC) ‡ National team caps and goals as of 02:51, 6 June 2026 (UTC)

Mason Melia (born 22 September 2007) is an Irish professional footballer who plays as a forward for EFL Championship club Lincoln City on loan from Premier League club Tottenham Hotspur and the Republic of Ireland national team.

== Early life ==
A native of Newtownmountkennedy, County Wicklow, Melia attended the Coláiste Chraobh Abhann, captaining the school's under-15 side to the 2022 Leinster U15s Shield, getting a goal and an assist in the 3–0 final victory.

== Club career ==
=== Youth career ===
Melia began playing football with local club Newtown Juniors, where he played until joining St Joseph's Boys at under-12 level. He later joined Bray Wanderers for a short stint, before moving to League of Ireland Premier Division side St Patrick's Athletic in the summer of 2022.

=== St Patrick's Athletic ===
==== 2023 season ====
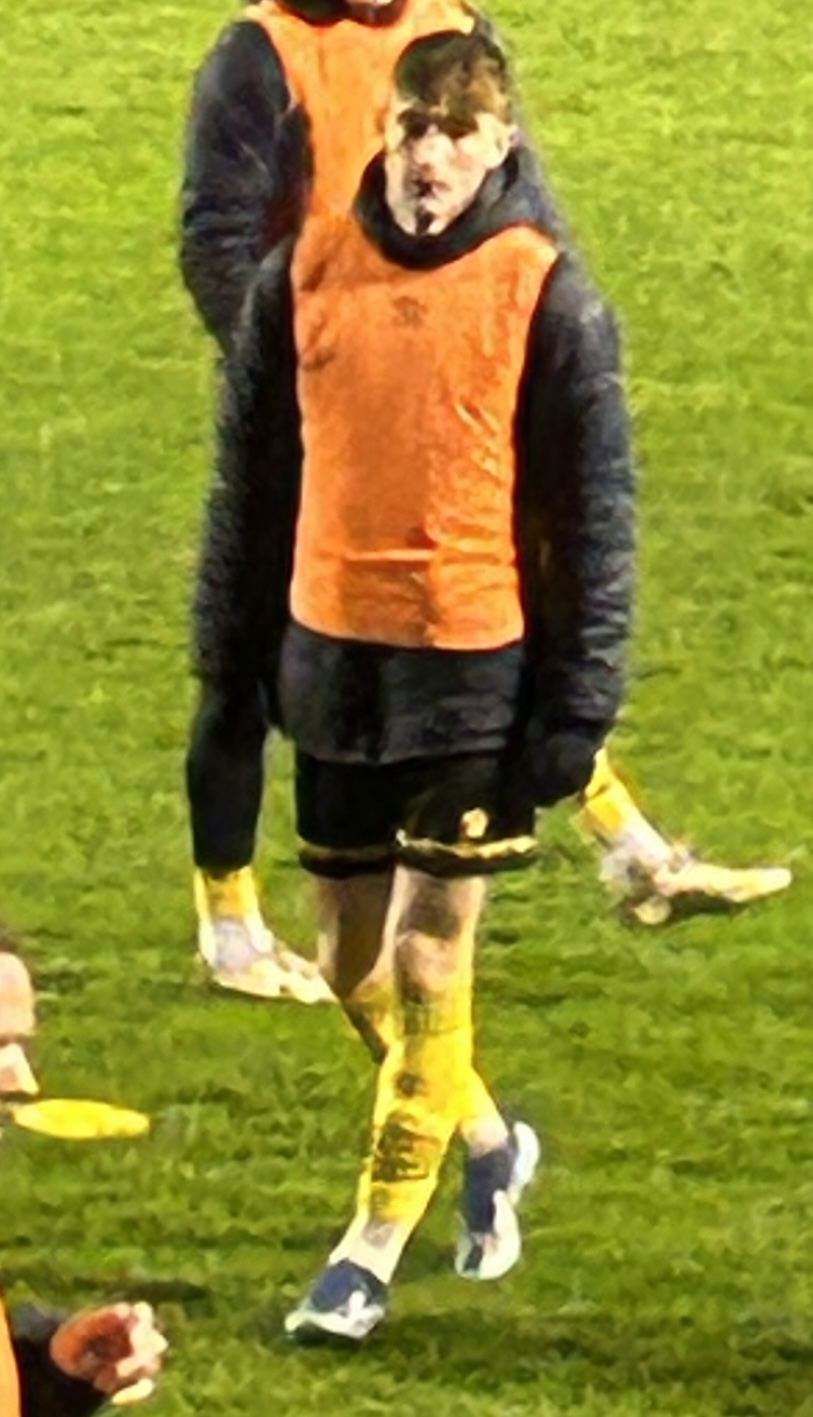
During a pre-match warmup in October 2023

His performances for the youth team of St Patrick's Athletic earned him a call up to the senior squad in January 2023, and he made his debut in a Leinster Senior Cup, coming off the bench to score in a 3–1 loss to Wexford. In doing so, he became St Patrick's Athletic's youngest ever player and youngest ever goal-scorer. In May 2023, with Eoin Doyle suspended and Tommy Lonergan ill, Melia was again drafted into the senior squad, and made his league debut as a substitute for Conor Carty in an eventual 3–0 win against Drogheda United in the LOI Premier Division. He became the club's youngest league debutant, and the third youngest in league history - behind Sam Curtis & Evan Ferguson. After the game, manager Jon Daly lauded Melia as an "exceptional" player. Following his performances for St Patrick's Athletic, he was linked with a move to English Premier League side Liverpool in March 2023. On 30 June 2023, Melia came off the bench to score his first senior league goal in a 7–0 win over UCD at Richmond Park, with the goal making him the youngest ever goalscorer in the League of Ireland Premier Division at 15 years and 281 days old. In August 2023, he spent time on trial at Manchester City. On 20 August 2023, Melia scored the winning penalty in a 4–3 shootout win over Derry City in the second round of the FAI Cup after a 0–0 draw at the Ryan McBride Brandywell Stadium. On 22 September 2023, on his 16th birthday, Melia came off the bench in the 83rd minute against Dundalk, before going on to win a penalty in injury time which he took himself and scored to secure a 3–1 win. On 9 November 2023, it was announced that Melia had signed his first professional contract with the club, signing a 3-year contract to keep him with the club until the end of the 2026 season. On 12 November 2023, Melia came off the bench in the 57th minute of the 2023 FAI Cup Final, making him the youngest ever player to play in an FAI Cup Final, as his side beat Bohemians 3–1 at the Aviva Stadium in front of a record breaking FAI Cup Final crowd of 43,881.

==== 2024 season ====
His first goal of the 2024 season came on 22 January in a Leinster Senior Cup game away to Usher Celtic. Melia scored his first league goal of the season on 1 April 2024, coming off the bench in the 77th minute at home to Sligo Rovers and finding the bottom corner 9 minutes later from 25 yards to help his side to a 3–0 victory. On 10 May 2024, Melia scored the final goal of the game in a Dublin derby away to Shamrock Rovers in a 2–2 draw at Tallaght Stadium. On 31 May 2024, Melia scored a backpost header to open the scoring in a 2–1 win over Galway United to help his side to their first league win under new manager Stephen Kenny. On 25 July 2024, Melia made his first European appearance of his career, starting up front in a 3–1 win over Vaduz of Liechtenstein in the UEFA Conference League. On 1 September 2024, Melia replaced Aidan Keena from the bench in the 76th minute at home to Drogheda United and scored the final goal of the game by finding the bottom left corner from 25 yards in the 93rd minute of a 4–1 win. On 5 September 2024, he again scored after coming off the bench, this time heading home the winner in the 68th minute of a 2–1 win away to Dundalk at Oriel Park, just 6 minutes after coming off the bench. Melia was voted by supporters as the club's Young Player of the Year at the club's end of season awards night. On 23 November 2024, Melia was named PFAI Young Player of the Year by his fellow professionals across the league, becoming the youngest winner in the award's 43-year history.

==== 2025 season ====
On 14 March 2025, Melia scored his first goal of the season, getting on the end of Jason McClelland's ball across the 6 yard box for his sides second goal of the game in a 3–0 win over Bohemians at Richmond Park. On 18 April 2025, he opened the scoring in a 2–2 draw at home to Shamrock Rovers with a back post volley on the turn that bounced through the legs of Edward McGinty. He scored his third goal of the season on 9 May 2025, opening the scoring away to Shelbourne in the 29th minute at Tolka Park. On 16 May 2025, Melia opened the scoring in a 3–2 victory over Cork City at Richmond Park with a bullet header from a Barry Baggley corner. On 23 May 2025, he scored a brace in a 2–2 draw at home to Waterford for his 4th goal in 4 games. On 17 July 2025, he scored the first European goal of his career, when he opened the scoring in the 6th minute away to Hegelmann of Lithuania, before assisting Kian Leavy's goal in the 56th minute of a 2–0 win for his side as they progressed to the next qualifying round of the UEFA Conference League. On 3 August 2025, Melia opened the scoring in a 2–0 win away to Waterford at the RSC. On 10 August 2025, he scored his 9th and 10th goals of the season in a 3–0 win over Sligo Rovers at Richmond Park. On 17 August 2025, Melia opened the scoring in a 2–0 win at home to rivals Shelbourne in the FAI Cup. On 29 August 2025, Melia scored his 10th league goal of the season with a solo effort in the 40th minute away to Derry City, before assisting Chris Forrester for a second half goal. On 22 September 2025, he scored twice in a 4–0 win at home to Cork City on his 18th birthday. On 24 October 2025, Melia scored in a 1–1 draw with Waterford in his final home appearance for the club, putting him level as the league's top goalscorer with Pádraig Amond on 13 goals. On 27 October 2025, he was voted by the club's supporters as St Patrick's Athletic Young Player of the Year for the second season in a row.

=== Tottenham Hotspur ===
On 4 February 2025, it was announced that St Patrick's Athletic had agreed the transfer of Melia to Premier League club Tottenham Hotspur on a contract until the summer of 2031, commencing in January 2026 for an undisclosed record transfer fee for a League of Ireland player, reported to be €2 million up front, rising to €4 million with add ons, plus a 20% sell on clause. He officially joined up with Tottenham on 1 January 2026, with manager Thomas Frank stating that he would assess Melia up close in training before making a decision on his immediate future with the club, with a loan move a possibility. On 4 April 2026, Melia made his debut for the Tottenham Hotspur U21s in a 3–2 win over West Ham United U21 and scored in the 70th minute, 3 minutes after replacing James Wilson from the bench. After taking part in pre-season training and the club's trip to Australia, Melia got his first minutes for the first-team on 29 July 2026, coming off the bench in the 65th minute of a 1–1 draw with Sydney FC in a friendly. In early August 2026, it was reported that up to 30 clubs were reportedly interested in signing Melia on loan for the upcoming season, with a loan to the EFL Championship the most likely option for Spurs.

==== Loan to Lincoln City ====
On 5 August 2026, Melia joined newly promoted EFL Championship club Lincoln City on loan for the duration of the 2026–27 season. He made his debut the same week in a 2–1 win away to Derby County at Pride Park in the EFL Cup, replacing Ben House from the bench. In early September 2026, he picked up a thigh injury that would keep him out of action for several months.

== Personal life ==
Melia is the nephew of former Republic of Ireland international footballer and sports agent Clive Clarke.

== Style of play ==
Melia has been described by his St Patrick's Athletic captain and centre back Joe Redmond as an all round striker, stating "He is a handful. His power, his speed and his finishing is incredible. He has a bit of everything. He can hold it up, he can go in behind, he can finish, he has got good control, and his maturity and knowledge of the game is really good as well."

In August 2025, Melia's finishing ability was praised by Manchester United legend Ole Gunnar Solskjær who faced Melia's side St Patrick's Athletic side in Europe as manager of Beşiktaş, stating before the tie that "We know we need to watch him. You see a mature finisher. I don't want to put too much pressure on him. I always follow the young players when I see them early in their careers. There are a few decent players I played with from Ireland so I have a fond eye for Irish players." He followed this up by praising Melia's movement and work rate off the ball after the game by saying "Melia has a bright future ahead of him, keeps getting runs and getting in the good areas. One of the things I like most about him is his attitude of pressing, he does his defensive job as well, second half he was tasked to sit on one of our midfielders and he did the job, Tottenham have made a good signing."

== International career ==
=== Underage ===
Melia has represented the Republic of Ireland from under-15 to under-21 level. He was part of the Irish under-16 side to win the 2022 Victory Shield, scoring in a 4–1 win in the final against Scotland.

He scored a hat-trick for the Republic of Ireland U17 side in a 3–0 against Ukraine, helping them qualify for the 2023 UEFA European Under-17 Championship, for which he was also called up. At those championships he scored two goals in Ireland's final group game, against Hungary, in a 4–2 win which put his side through to the quarter-finals. On 11 October 2023, he scored a hat-trick in a 4–0 win over Armenia U17 in a 2024 UEFA U-17 Euro qualification fixture in Fermoy.

In November 2023, he received his first call up to the Republic of Ireland U19 side, for their 2024 UEFA European Under-19 Championship qualification games against Albania, Slovenia & Belgium. On 10 September 2024, Melia scored his first goal for the U19s, in a 1–1 draw away to Slovenia in a friendly.

In October 2024, Melia received his first call up to the Republic of Ireland U21 team, for their 2025 UEFA European Under-21 Championship qualification games against Norway and Italy, but missed out through injury. He made his debut for the U21s on 24 March 2025, opening the scoring in a 3–1 win over Hungary U21 from the penalty spot, making him the youngest ever goalscorer for the U21s at 17 years 6 months and 2 days old, beating Troy Parrott's record by a month. On 4 September 2025, he made his first competitive appearance for the 21s, scoring both goals in a 2–1 win away to Moldova in a 2027 UEFA European Under-21 Championship Qualifier.

=== Senior ===
In May 2026, Melia received his first call up to the senior Republic of Ireland squad for their friendlies against Qatar and Canada. He made his senior international debut on 28 May 2026, replacing Troy Parrott as a late substitute in a 1–0 win over Qatar at the Aviva Stadium.

== Career statistics ==
=== Club ===
As of match played on 1 September 2026

Appearances and goals by club, season and competition
Club	Season	League			National cup (Note: Includes FAI Cup & FA Cup)		League cup (Note: Includes EFL Cup)		Europe		Other		Total	
Club	Season	Division	Apps	Goals	Apps	Goals	Apps	Goals	Apps	Goals	Apps	Goals	Apps	Goals
St Patrick's Athletic	2023	LOI Premier Division	10	2	2	0	–		0 (Note: Appearance(s) in the UEFA Europa Conference League)	0	1 (Note: Appearance(s) in the Leinster Senior Cup)	1	13	3
St Patrick's Athletic	2024	LOI Premier Division	31	6	1	0	–		6 (Note: Appearance(s) in the UEFA Conference League)	0	3 (Note: One appearance in the President of Ireland's Cup; two appearances, one goal in the Leinster Senior Cup)	1	41	7
St Patrick's Athletic	2025	LOI Premier Division	35	13	3	1	–		6	1	0	0	44	15
St Patrick's Athletic	Total		76	21	6	1	0	0	12	1	4	2	98	25
Tottenham Hotspur	2025–26	Premier League	0	0	0	0	–		0 (Note: Appearance(s) in the UEFA Champions League)	0	–		0	0
Tottenham Hotspur	2026–27	Premier League	0	0	0	0	0	0	–		–		0	0
Tottenham Hotspur	Total		0	0	0	0	0	0	0	0	0	0	0	0
Lincoln City (loan)	2026–27	EFL Championship	2	0	0	0	2	0	–		–		4	0
Career total			78	21	6	1	2	0	12	1	4	2	102	25

=== International ===
As of match played on 5 June 2026

Appearances and goals by national team and year
National team	Year	Apps	Goals
Republic of Ireland	2026	2	0
Total		2	0

== Honours ==
St Patrick's Athletic

- FAI Cup: 2023
- Leinster Senior Cup: 2023–24

Individual

- PFAI Young Player of the Year: 2024
- St Patrick's Athletic Young Player of the Year: 2024, 2025
