= Kilcoole Church =

- Cill Chomhghaill
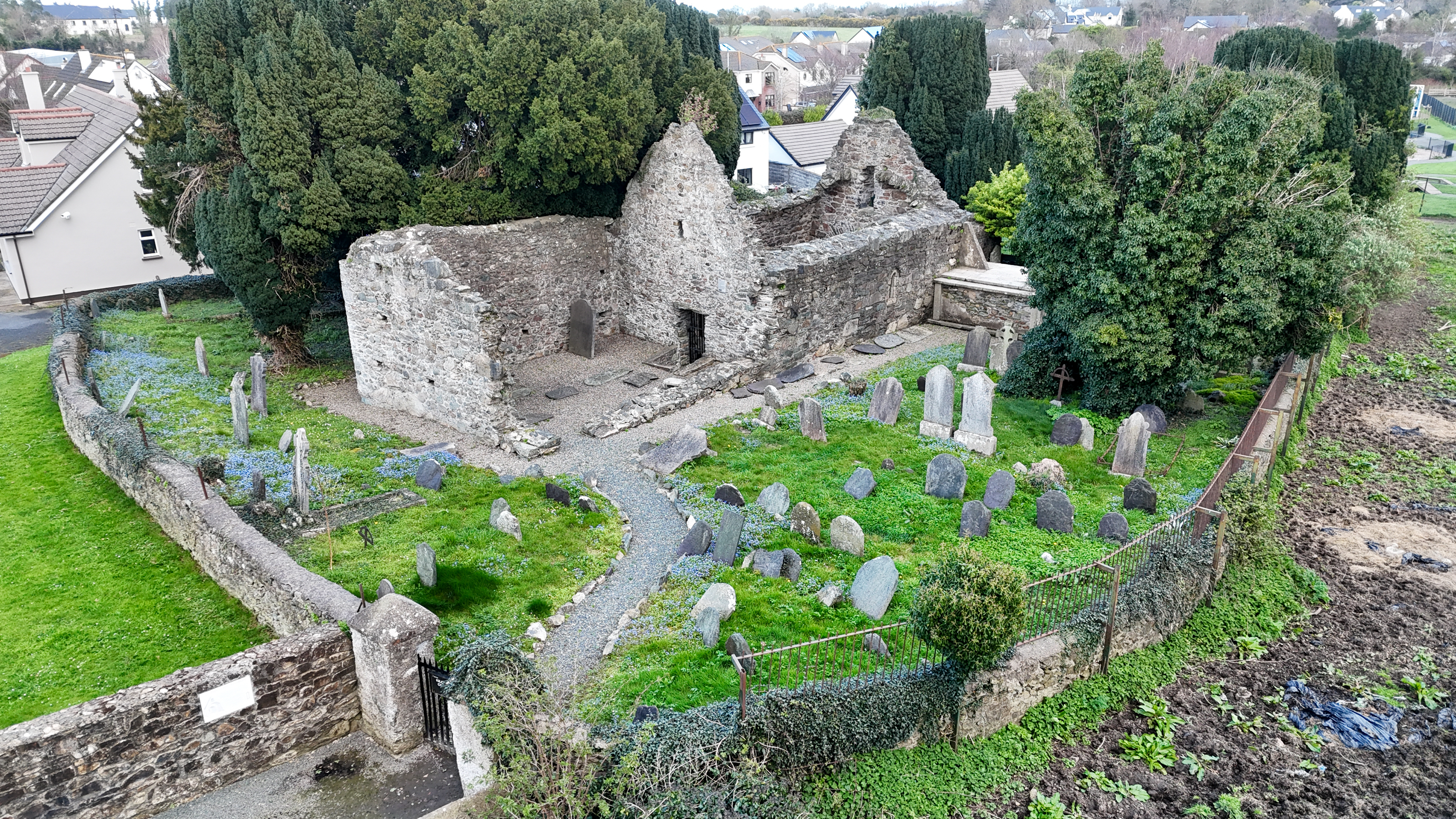
- Kilcoole Church in 2026

- Location within Ireland
- 53.107089°N 6.062804°W
- Location: Lott Lane, Kilcoole, County Wicklow
- Country: Ireland
- Denomination: Pre-Reformation Catholic

History
- Founded: 12th century
- Dedication: Mary, mother of Jesus

Architecture
- Style: Celtic Christianity
- Years built: 12th century

Specifications
- Length: 23 m (75 ft)
- Width: 6 m (20 ft)
- Height: 9 m (30 ft)
- Materials: stone

Administration
- Diocese: Dublin

National monument of Ireland
- Official name: Kilcoole
- Reference no.: 267

Kilcoole Church, also called Old Kilcoole Church, is a medieval church and National Monument in Kilcoole, County Wicklow, Ireland.

== Location ==
Kilcoole Church is located on Lott Lane in the centre of Kilcoole village, 1.5 km (0.93 mi) west of the seashore. At 6°03′46″W, it is the easternmost of the Republic of Ireland's National Monuments.

== History ==
The church derives its name from a Saint Comgall (not the famous Comgall of Bangor). The church was built in the 12th century and was dedicated to Mary, mother of Jesus.

Thady Byrne of Ballygannon, a senior member of the O'Byrne family, was buried at Kilcoole Church in 1707.

== Church ==
The church is a nave and chancel structure. The chancel probably once had a step-pitched stone roof, with a small attic roof over the chancel. The nave has a square baptismal font, a cross slab and a small round-headed window in the south wall.

The west part of the church was added later as a two-storey living quarters.

A holy well is located 100 m (110 yd) to the northeast.
