= Castletimon Ogham Stone =

- Cloch Oghaim Chaisleán tSíomóin (Irish)
- The Long Stone; The Giant's Stone
- Location within Ireland
- 52.904307°N 6.070199°W
- Type: Ogham stone
- Location: Castletimon, Brittas Bay, County Wicklow, Ireland

History
- Built: AD 350–550

Site notes
- Elevation: 52 m (171 ft)
- Height: 1.5 metres (4.9 ft)
- Area: Liffey Valley

National monument of Ireland
- Official name: Castletimon
- Reference no.: 304

Castletimon Ogham Stone (CIIC 047) is an ogham stone and National Monument located near Brittas Bay, County Wicklow, Ireland.

== Location ==
Castletimon Ogham Stone lies prone by the roadside 2.2 km (1.4 mi) west of Ballynacarrig beach, which opens onto Brittas Bay. Potter's River flows 260 m (280 yd) to the south.

== History ==
Castletimon Ogham Stone was carved c. AD 350–550, and was rediscovered in 1854.

Local legend claims that the Ogham stone was once picked up by the Castletimon Giant and thrown down the hill; the scratches on it were left by his finger nails. Another says that a local man took the Ogham stone to use as a hob stone. The Aos Sí (fairies) got angry and made his cutlery dance and jiggle. After a week of this he returned the stone to its place.

== Description ==
Castletimon Ogham Stone measures 150 × 48 × 20 cm and has Ogham carvings incised on one edge. ᚛ᚅᚓᚈᚐᚉᚐᚏᚔᚅᚓᚈᚐᚉᚉᚐᚌᚔ᚜ (NETACARI NETA CAGI, perhaps "Netacari, nephew of Cagi"). Variant readings include NETACARI NETACAMI, QEVASARI QEVASAGI or NETACARI SETACAGI.
