= Kilcoole =

Town in County Wicklow, Ireland

Kilcoole Irish: Cill Chomhghaill
- Town
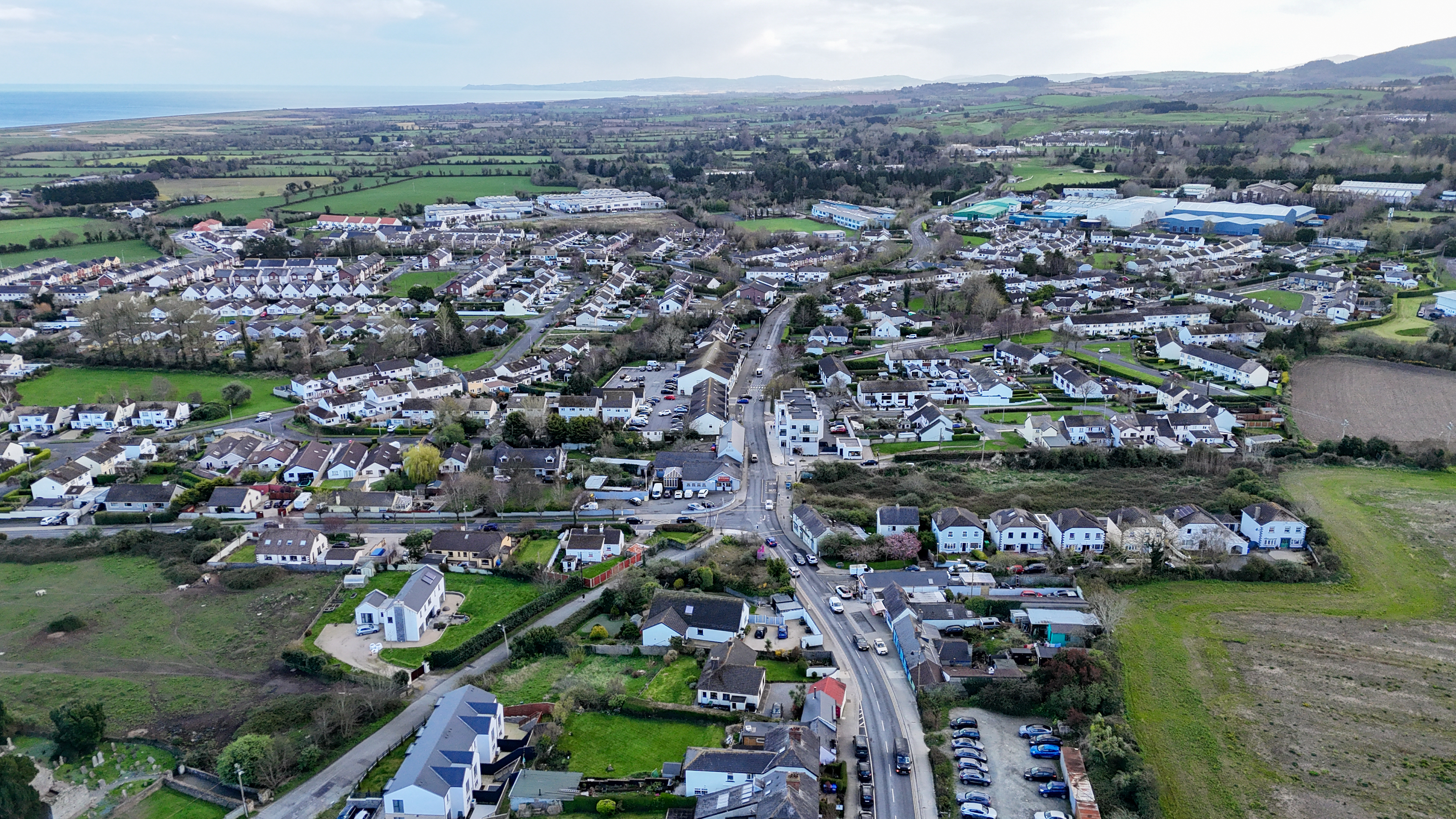
- Skyline of Kilcoole

- Location in Ireland
- Coordinates: 53°06′23″N 6°03′52″W
- Country: Ireland
- Province: Leinster
- County: County Wicklow
- Elevation: 8 m (26 ft)

Population (2016)
  - Total: 4,239
- Time zone: UTC+0 (WET)
  - Summer (DST): UTC-1 (IST (WEST))
- Irish Grid Reference: O293080

Kilcoole (Irish: Cill Chomhghaill, meaning 'church of Comhghall') is a town in County Wicklow, Ireland. It is 3 kilometres (2 mi) south of Greystones, 14 km (9 mi) north of Wicklow, and about 28 km (17 mi) south of Dublin. The town is in a townland and civil parish of the same name. Kilcoole was used as a filming location for the Irish television series Glenroe, which ran through the 1980s and 1990s.

The town has a large industrial estate to the south. An area of marshland runs along the coast from Kilcoole south to Wicklow town, called the Murragh. This area is home to many endangered species of plants and animals. The nearby beach is the summertime home of the little tern, one of the few places in Ireland where these birds nest. Within Kilcoole, is an area of flora known as the Rock which is a huge rock/hill that predates the Cambrian Period.

Kilcoole is in the Roman Catholic parish of Kilquade and the local church, St. Anthony's Church, was opened in 1968.

== History ==
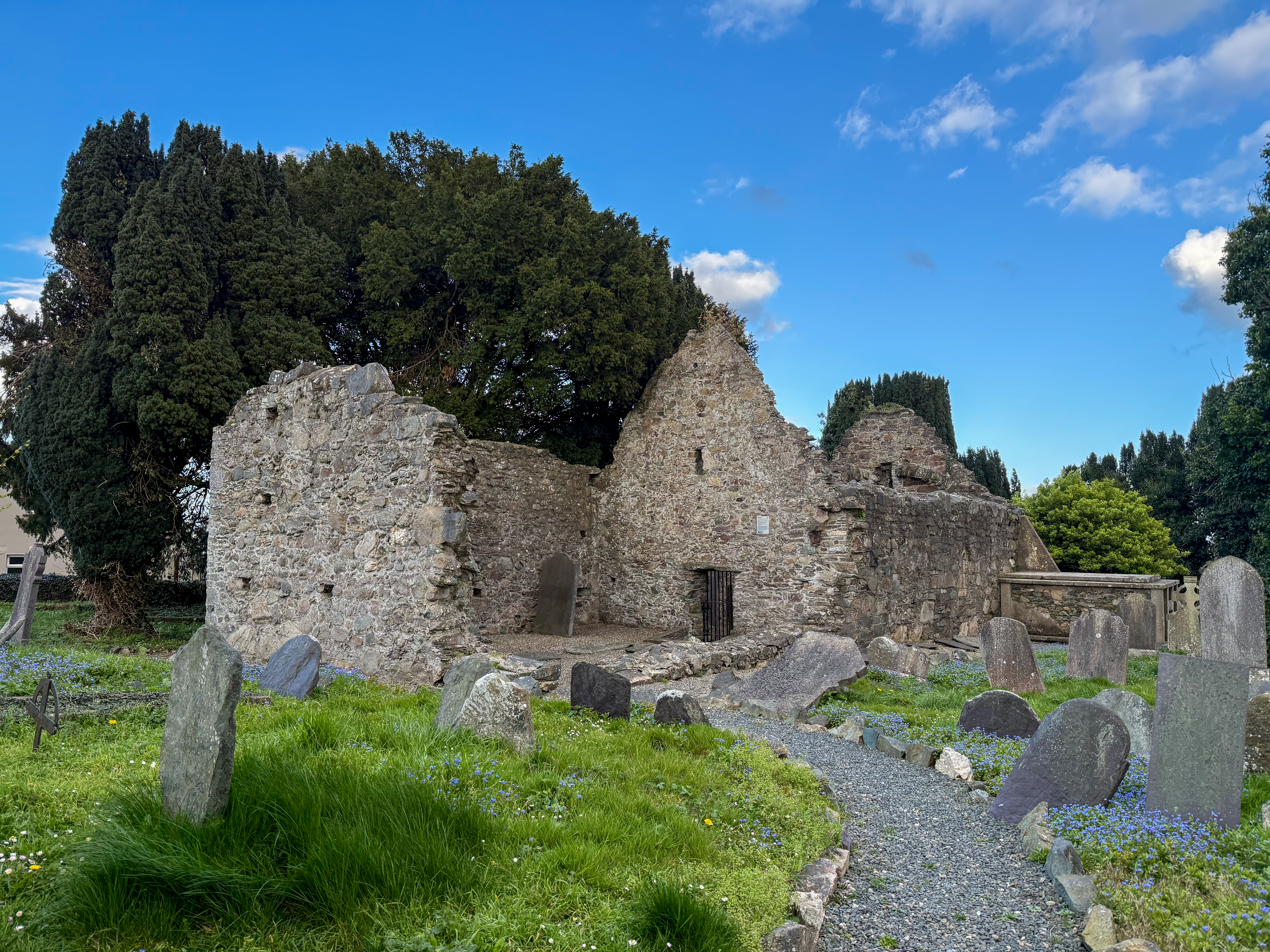
Kilcoole Church, a protected national monument, dates to the 12th century

Evidence of ancient settlement in the area includes a number of fulacht fiadh, bullaun and holy well sites in the townlands of Kilcoole, Kilquade and Ballycrone. Kilcoole Church, close to the centre of Kilcoole, is reputed to date to the 12th century and is a protected national monument.

Next to Kilcoole railway station (built c. 1855) is a monument commemorating the landing of 600 rifles and ammunition for the Irish Volunteers on board the Chotah by Sir Thomas Myles in August 1914. It is eclipsed by accounts of the contemporary landing of Volunteer's arms at Howth on board the Asgard. On 1 August 1914, 600 Mauser rifles and 20,000 rounds of ammunition were landed at the beach in Kilcoole. The arms and ammunition was smuggled using Myles's boat during the night. When the arms were landed they were removed on bicycles and in vehicles by volunteers. The arms were taken to Pádraig Pearse's school, St Enda's, in Rathfarnham, County Dublin.

== Education ==
Coláiste Chraobh Abhann is a community secondary college, located on the southern outskirts of Kilcoole, which opened in 2003.

Kilcoole Primary School formerly consisted of Saint Anthony's Boys' National School and Saint Brigids Girls' National School, which were amalgamated in 2010. Junior students are now taught in the building formerly occupied by Saint Brigid's and the Saint Anthony's building accommodates pupils in the latter half of primary schooling.

== Demographics ==
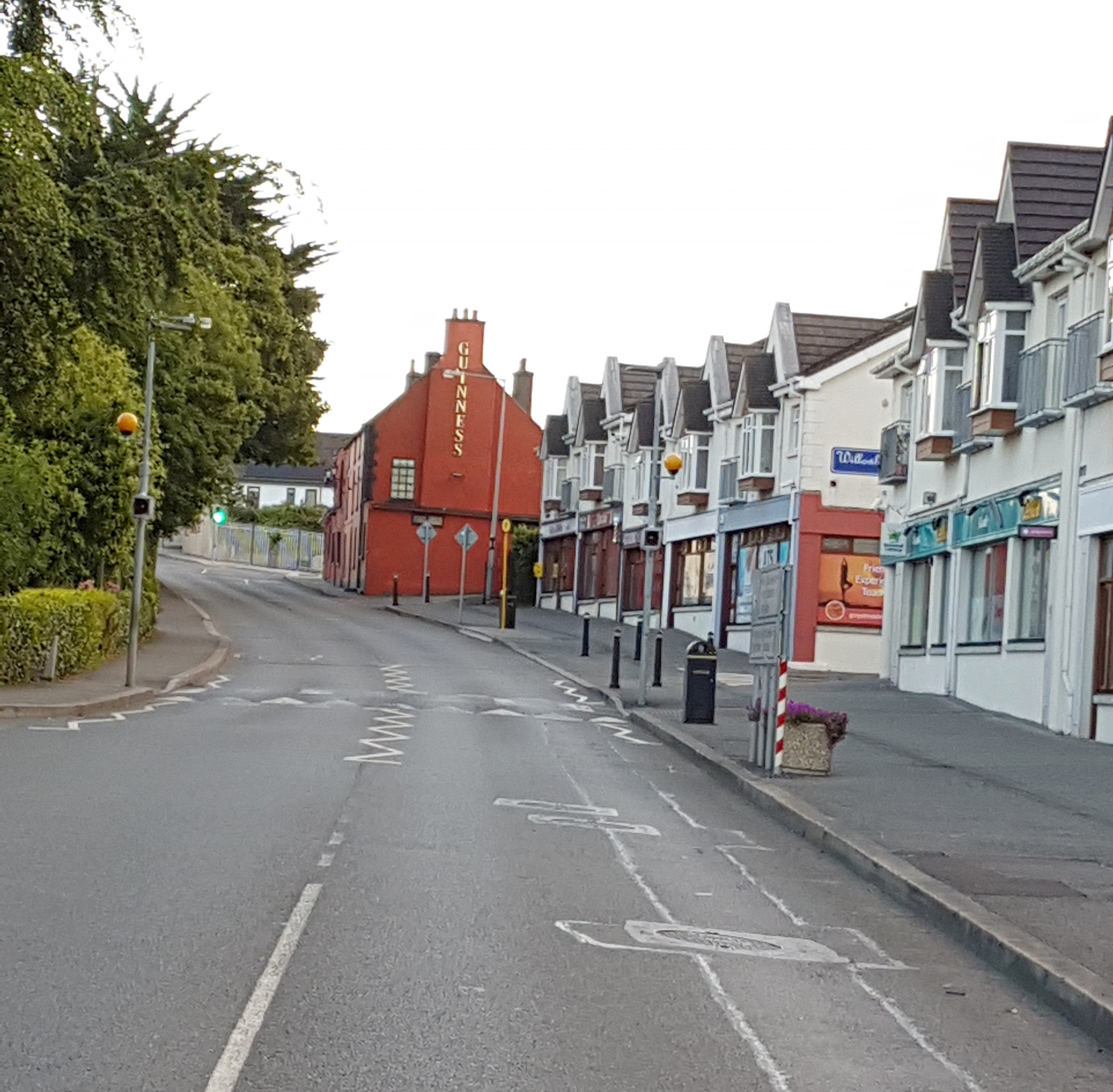
Kilcoole in 2017

Kilcoole, which is classified by Wicklow County Council as a "small growth town" for administration and planning purposes, had a population of 4,239 as of the 2016 census. This marked a 60% increase (from 2,694 people) in the 20 years since the 1996 census.

== Sports ==
=== Athletics ===
Kilcoole Athletics Club was founded in 1970. Its members have represented Ireland at various levels, including at the Olympic Games. Kilcoole AC athletes have set national, provincial, intervarsity and school records in cross country and javelin events. The club holds one of the longest-standing athletics records when a ladies' team set the provincial (Leinster) record for the 4 × 400 m relay in 1987.

The National Cross Country Championships were hosted in the area three times; in 1975, 1979 and 1997. The venue for the first two events was Fox's Field on Cooldross Lane (the Holywell Crescent road cuts through where the finishing line was situated). On the third occasion the venue was Druids Glen Golf Resort.

=== Golf ===
Druids Glen Golf Resort, which hosted the Irish open from 1996 to 1999 as well as the National Cross Country Athletics Championships in 1997, is located less than one kilometre (1000m) from Kilcoole, on the Newtownmountkennedy road. Kilcoole Golf Course, a nine-hole parkland course, is also nearby. Druids Heath Golf Course, another championship course, is also located in Druids Glen.

=== Soccer ===
Saint Anthony's Football Club provides football for boys and girls from age six upwards. Almost 300 members make up their competing teams from under eight through under eighteen and adult.

=== Gaelic games ===
Kilcoole GAA fields teams in both hurling and Gaelic football, with representation for both men and women at junior and juvenile levels.

== Transport ==
Dublin Bus provides a limited service between Kilcoole and Dublin on its X1 and X2 bus routes, with a journey time of about 80 minutes. The service on the L2 bus route terminates at Bray Station.

Iarnród Éireann has a station at the beach; Kilcoole railway station opened on 30 October 1855. There are limited train services along this line. On weekdays the mainline train stops twice in the early morning in the Dublin direction and three times in the late afternoon/early evening in the Rosslare direction. However, from December 2022, all trains on the weekend which run through the station stop at Kilcoole. This means that, on Saturdays, there will be 4 trains northbound and 3 southbound, and on Sundays, 3 trains in each direction. A more regular DART (Electric train) service runs from Greystones to Dublin city centre and beyond to Howth and Malahide.

== Music ==
Several bands, including punk and post-rock bands, have been based in Kilcoole. Acts associated with the area include Adebisi Shank, Enemies, and Heathers. The Hive Recording Studio is also situated in Kilcoole.

The Kilcoole Music Festival is an annual festival started in 1955 by the then district nurse, Mary Kiernan, who saw a need to help the area's children develop their talents. The festival awards individuals in over 50 classes ranging from vocal solos to orchestras, and flute to rock guitar.

== In popular culture ==
Kilcoole was the setting for the long-running popular soap-opera Glenroe, which ran from 1983 until 2001 and was broadcast on RTÉ One television. The farm on which it was based is now an open farm and hosts events annually. Kilcoole was also used as a setting for scenes in the comedy series Moone Boy.

== People ==
- Elaine Cassidy, actress, moved to Kilcoole when she was three.
- J. P. Donleavy, writer, wrote his debut novel The Ginger Man while living in Kilcoole.
- Fionnuala McCormack, an athlete who has represented Ireland internationally, is a member of Kilcoole Athletic Club.
- Mason Melia, association footballer who attended Coláiste Chraobh Abhann school in Kilcoole

== See also ==
- List of towns and villages in Ireland
