= James Fenton (farmer) =

Australian farmer and writer

James Fenton (1820–1901), was an Irish-born Australian farmer and writer.

He was born 20 November 1820 in Dunlavin, Ireland. His family emigrated in 1833, and (after his father's death en route) arrived in Hobart Town, Van Diemen's Land (now Hobart in Tasmania) in 1834. Starting in 1840 he pioneered on the island's Forth River, first clearing heavy forest for farming. Visiting the Yarra River in 1852 during the Victoria gold rush, he perceived a market for lumber and undertook lumbering on the Forth. In 1879 he retired from farming.

He published A History of Tasmania in 1884, and in 1891 Bush Life in Tasmania Fifty Years Ago, subtitled

An Account of Pioneer Work in Devon, the Natives, Murder of the First Settler, Bushrangers, Visit to J.P. Fawkner, Melbourne in the Early Days, Gold-digging Times, Great Prosperity on the Coast, History of the Coal Mines, Etc., Etc., Etc

and the Life of Rev. Charles Price (Melbourne, 1886). He died 24 June 1901.
