= Crossoona Rath =

- Ráth Chrois Uaithne (Irish)
- Location within Ireland
- 52.944262°N 6.614062°W
- Type: ringfort and ogham stone
- Cultures: Gaelic Ireland
- Location: Boleycarrigeen, Kilranelagh, County Wicklow, Ireland
- Region: Wicklow Mountains

Site notes
- Material: earth
- Elevation: 302 m (991 ft)
- Height: 1.5 m (4 ft 11 in)
- Area: 0.41 ha (1.0 acre)
- Diameter: 65 m (213 ft)
- Archaeologists: Grogan and Kilfeather
- Owner: private

National monument of Ireland
- Official name: Crossoona Rath
- Reference no.: 418

Crossoona Rath (Irish: Ráth Chrois Uaithne [ˈɾˠaːh xɾˠɔʃ ˈuənʲə]) is a ringfort located in County Wicklow, Ireland. Together with a nearby ogham stone, it forms a National Monument.

== Location ==
Crossoona Rath is located on the SE face of Kilranelagh Hill, near two tributaries of the Slaney and 6.5 km (4.0 mi) east of Baltinglass.

== History ==
Crossoona Rath is believed to have been the dwelling of several (semi)historical figures of the first millennium AD:

- Eochaid Doimlén of Ráth Imáil, first-century King of Leinster lived near the Glen of Imaal
- Buchet, hero of the 10th-century tale Esnada Tige Buchet ("The Melodies of Buchet's House"), is believed to have lived "at or near the present Kilranelagh House" on Kilranelagh Hill
- Rónán mac Aed, in the literary-historical fiction Fingal Rónáin ("The Kinslaying of Ronan"), lived at or near Kilranelagh Hill

Crossoona Rath is a likely home for at least some of these people: it is a spacious enclosure situated on the southeast slope of the hill and is protected from the weather on the north and west by the bulk of the hill, on the north by the higher Spinans Hill, and on the east by the higher Keadeen Mountain.

== Description ==
Crossoona Rath is roughly circular and is defined by an earth and stone bank and external moat, with outer bank to the south. Foundations of two stone structures are in the northwest part.

=== Ogham stone ===
The ogham stone (CIIC 50) is located inside the rath and has been dated to AD 400–500 and reads ᚛ᚃᚑᚈᚔ᚜ (VOTI or FOTI), possibly the genitive of a personal name Votas or Votus, or maybe related to the Irish words foth ("law, claim, right") or fotha ("base, foundation").
