= Archdeacon of Glendalough =

Province of Dublin
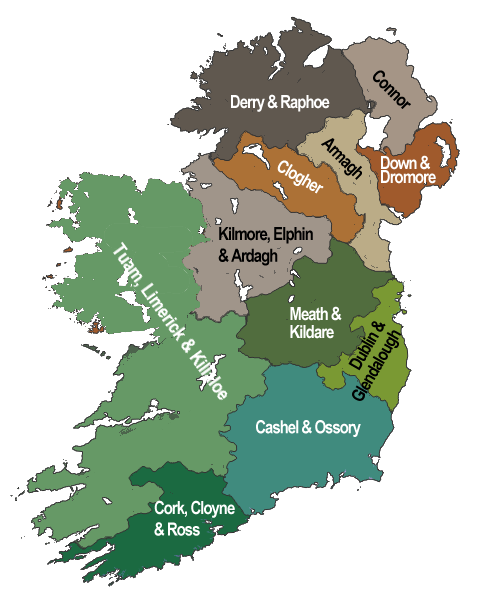
- Church: Church of Ireland, historically also Roman Catholic
- Metropolitan bishop: Archbishop of Dublin
- Cathedral: Christ Church Cathedral, Dublin
- Dioceses: 5

The office of Archdeacon of Glendalough is a senior ecclesiastical role within the Anglican Diocese of Dublin and Glendalough, previously the Diocese of Glendalough. As such he was responsible for the disciplinary supervision of the clergy within the Diocese. The Roman Catholic succession of the role ceased long ago but it continues in the Church of Ireland.

== History ==
The archdeaconry can trace its history back to Conaing O'Carrail who held the office in 1031. Notable holders include William de la Corner (an unsuccessful candidate to be Archbishop of Dublin, and later Bishop of Salisbury from 1288 to 1291); Nicholas de Balscote, an English-born official and judge in fourteenth-century Ireland; Adam Loftus, 1st Viscount Loftus; Edward Parry (Bishop of Killaloe from 1647 to 1650); and Edward Moore (Bishop of Kilmore, Elphin and Ardagh from 1959 to 1981).

== 21st century ==
As of 2008, the holder of the office is Neal John O'Raw.
