= Tornant Moat =

Irish National Monument

- Móta Thor Neannta (Irish)
- Location within Ireland
- 53.045350°N 6.701020°W
- Type: ringfort and barrows
- Location: Tornant Lower, Dunlavin, County Wicklow, Ireland
- Region: Wicklow Mountains

Site notes
- Material: earth
- Elevation: 216 m (709 ft)
- Height: 5 m (16 ft)
- Owner: private

National monument of Ireland
- Official name: Tornant Lower Ringfort & Barrows
- Reference no.: 531

Tornant Moat is an Irish National Monument composed of a ringfort and nearby barrows.

== Location ==
Tornant Moat is located 1.3 km (0.81 mi) south of Dunlavin.

== History ==
Tornant Moat consists of a ringfort and barrows. The name derives from the Irish tor neannta, "nettle mound."

== Description ==
Tornant Moat is a large circular ringfort (diameter m) with bank and moat and raised centre.
