= Piper's Stones =

Bronze Age stone circle in Ireland

The Pipers Stones
- Clocha an Phíobaire
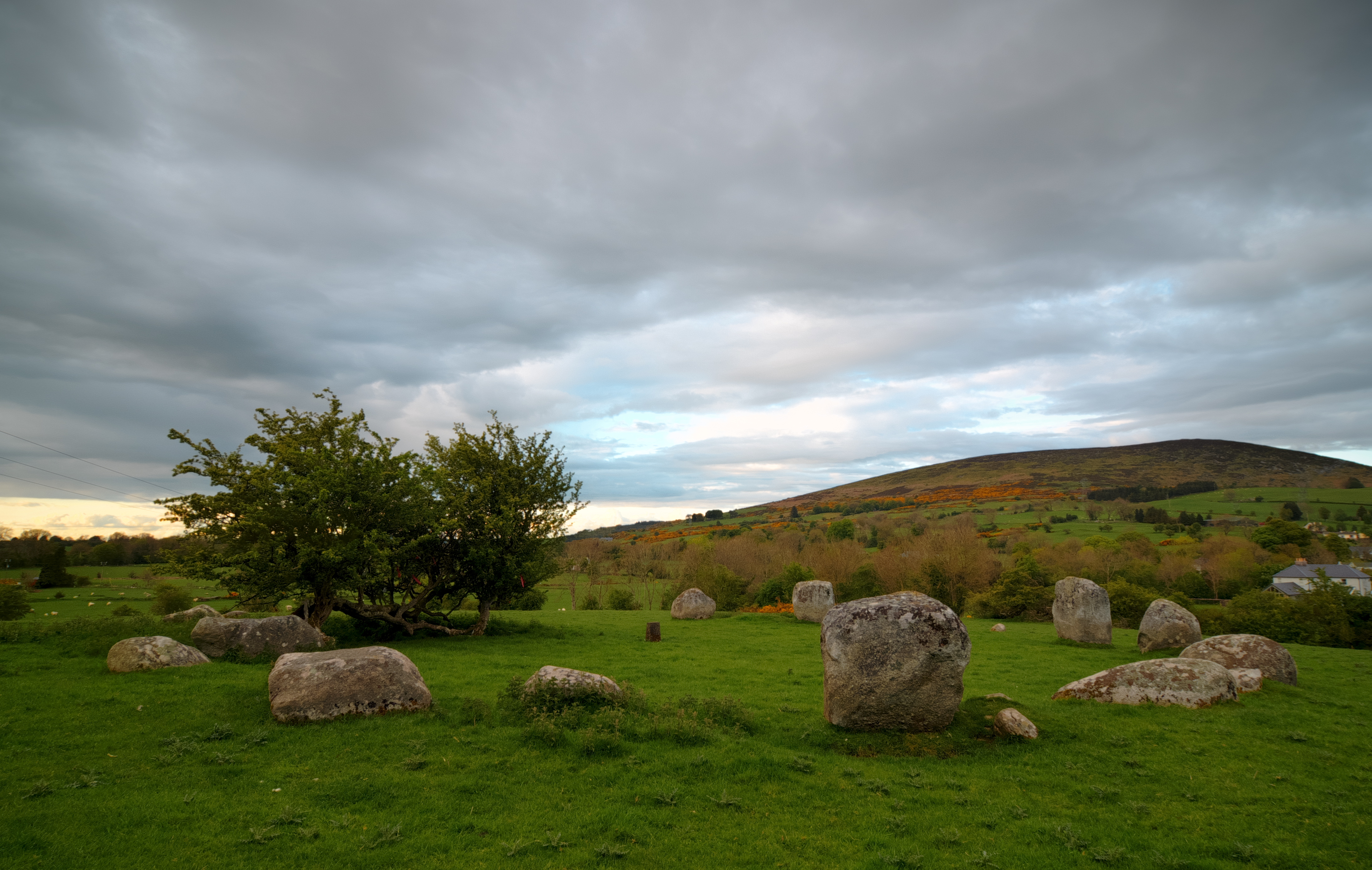
- The site in 2014

- Location within Ireland
- 53.0719°N 6.6128°W
- Type: Stone circle
- Periods: late Bronze Age
- Cultures: Pre-Celtic
- Location: County Wicklow, Province of Leinster

History
- Built: 1400–500 BC

Site notes
- Width: 23 m (75 ft)
- Owner: Public
- Public access: Yes

National monument of Ireland
- Official name: Piper's Stones
- Reference no.: 416

The Piper's Stones or the Athgreany stone circle is a Bronze Age stone circle at Athgreany, County Wicklow. It sits on a low hillock overlooking the N81, 2 km south of Hollywood.

== Description ==
The stone circle sits on the end of a low ridge, enclosed at a distance by high ground on all sides. It is thought that someone attempted to remove the circle unsuccessfully, disturbing the stones placement in the process. Now the site is composed of 16 granite boulders, with 5 remaining in their original placements. In the Ordnance Survey of 1941 reported 29 stones originally. The stones range in height from 1.3 m to 1.92 m. There has been no archaeological investigation of the site, so the construction date is only estimated to be from the late Bronze Age, approximately 1400–500 BCE. The circle is roughly 23 m in diameter. An outlying larger stone, 2 m in height, stands outside the circle to the north east. Some of the stones show signs of degraded carved megalithic art, consisting of grooves and cup-marks.

== History ==
The stone's name, The Piper's Stones, is believed to have derived from a local folk tale that said those caught dancing there on a Sunday would turn to stone, with the stones representing such revellers. An outlying stone on the north east represents the piper. There is an old hawthorn tree growing around the stone's circumference, this tree is associated with fairies and other folklore.

There are four other circles that have been given the same name, another in County Wicklow, two in County Kildare, and one more in County Kerry. These others also have a similar folk tale associated with them, and has been seen as a way of classifying such circles. A stone circle named the Pipers Stones existed near Blessington, but was destroyed at some point prior to 1838.

== Access ==
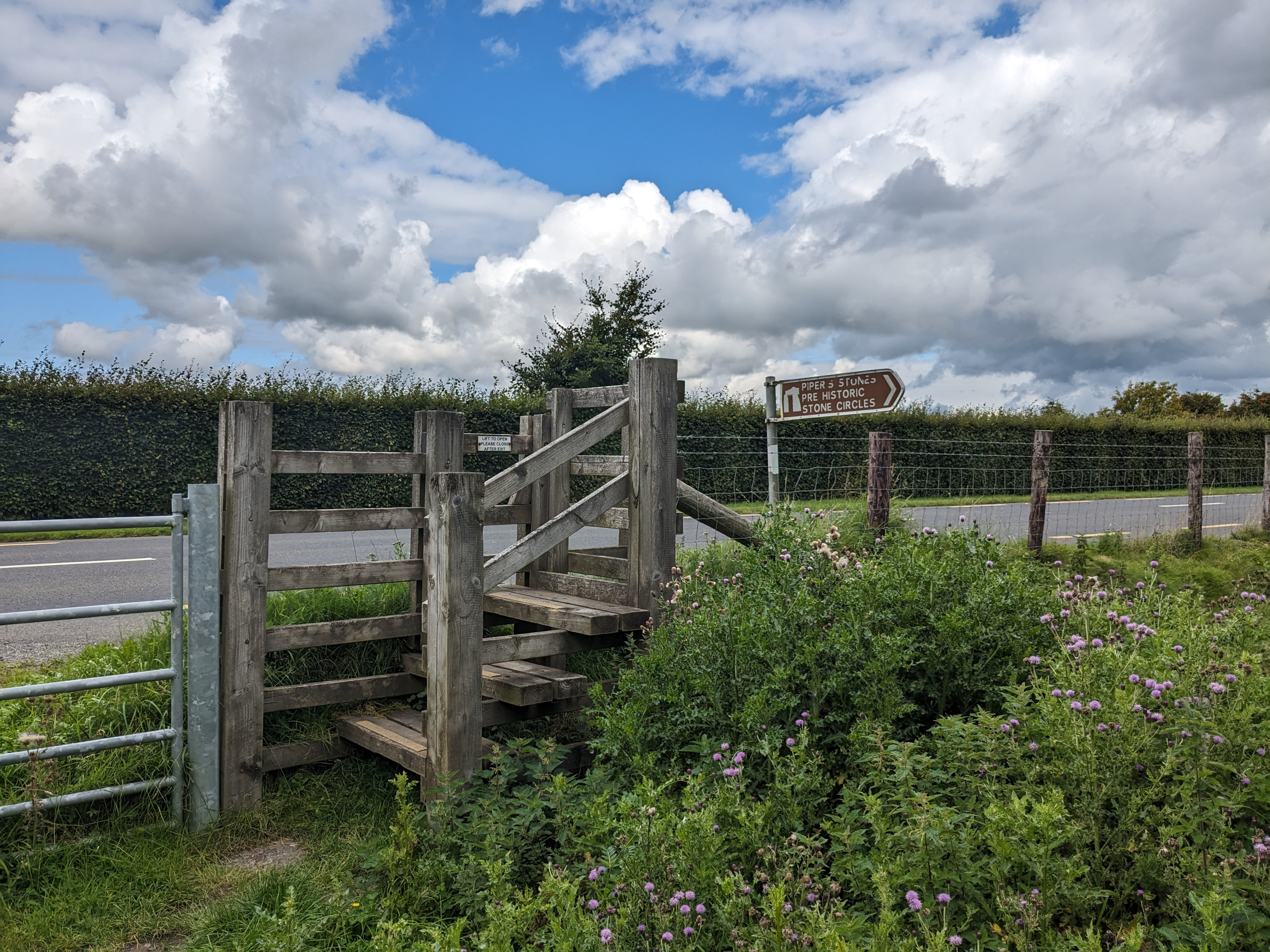
Piper's Stones access on the N81

The site is sign-posted, and there is parking on a hard-shoulder. The circle is accessed over a locked gate or over a wooden stile. From the stile the circle is 200 m up a low hill.
