= Castleruddery Stone Circle =

Stone circle and National Monument in County Wicklow, Ireland

- Liagchiorcal Chaisleán an Ridire (Irish)
- Druidical Circle
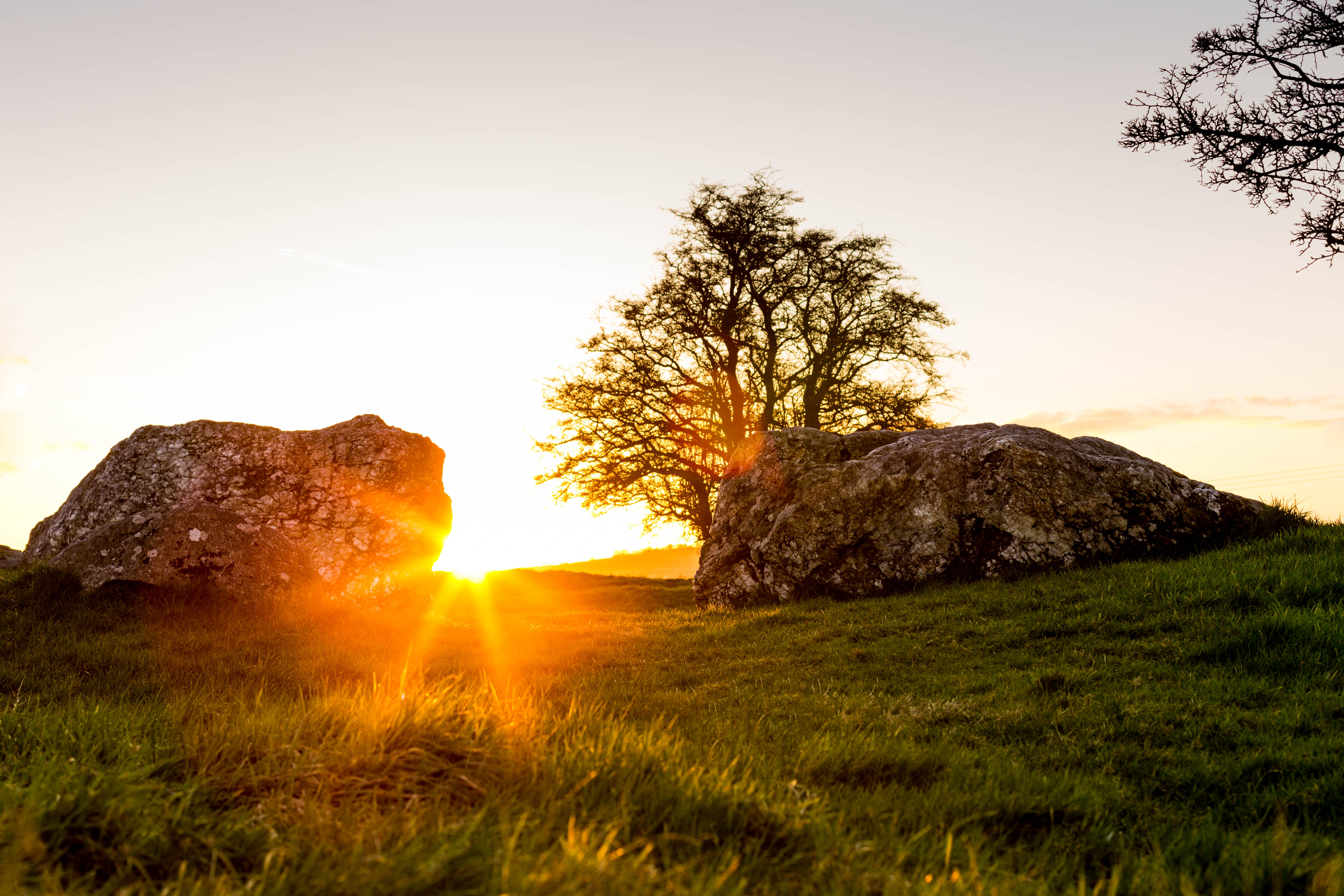

- Location within Ireland
- 52.991202°N 6.636809°W
- Type: recumbent stone circle
- Location: Castleruddery Lower, Donard, County Wicklow, Ireland

History
- Built: c. 2500 BC

Site notes
- Area: Slaney Valley

National monument of Ireland
- Official name: Castleruddery
- Reference no.: 441

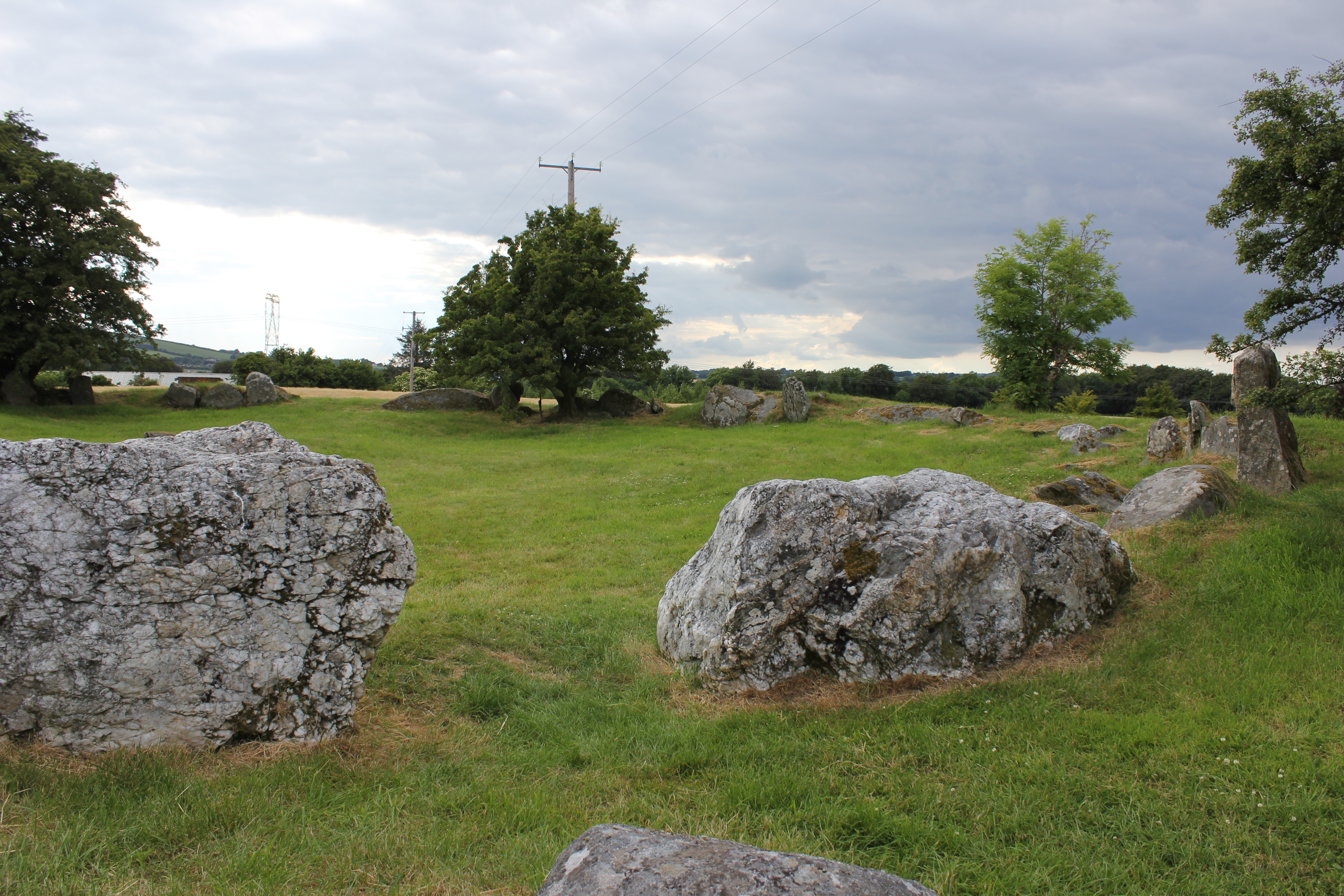
View of Castleruddery Stone Circle

Castleruddery Stone Circle is a recumbent stone circle and National Monument located in County Wicklow, Ireland.

== Location ==
Castleruddery Stone Circle is located 2.5 km (1.6 mi) east of Stratford-on-Slaney, 300 m (330 yd) north of the River Slaney.

== History ==
The stone circle was built c. 2505 BC.

== Description ==
Castleruddery Stone Circle is 30 m (98 ft) in diameter. It is composed of 29 stones, some of which are decorated with cup marks. The circle has two enormous recumbent white quartz portal stones at the entrance, each weighing at least 15 tons. The circle itself is surrounded by an embankment about 1.2 m (3 ft 11 in) high. The 4.5 m (15 ft) metre wide bank has an opening in the east.
