= Parkbridge =

Village in County Wicklow, Ireland

Parkbridge-Park Droichead na Páirce - Páirc
- Village
- Location in Ireland
- Coordinates: 52.728045°N 6.595039°W
- Country: Ireland
- Province: Leinster
- County: County Wicklow
- Irish Grid Reference: M451019

Parkbridge (from Irish: Droichead na Páirce meaning 'Bridge of the Field') is a village in the civil parish of Moyacomb, barony of Shillelagh, County Wicklow, Ireland.

== Geography ==
Parkbridge is bounded on the west by Raheengraney, on the east by Park townland, on the north by Coolruss townland, and on the south by Drummin townland. The chief geographical feature is the Gráinne river which flows from the townland of Aghowle to the north down as far as the lower end of the townland of Drummin where it meets the River Derry.

== Etymology ==
The first mention of the name is in post office records as follows: "Park Bridge: A small bridge with two arches over a stream without a name" 1608 "The Parke", CPR, 1636 Le Parke, Chancery Inq; c.1638 Parketown, Earl of Meath Documents; c. 1660 Parke BSD, HMR; 1760 Park, Levilles Map Price VI, 377

== History ==
The townland appears in the listing of rents under the estate of Lord Fitzwilliam in the 1800s. A post office was opened in Parkbridge in 1878 and was closed on 23 November 1997 when its post town was Enniscorthy.

== Antiquities ==
Underneath the bridge and beside the Gráinne river an unmarked Gráinne's Well exists. It has been known to be of spiritual importance to the people of the area, who in times past gathered water and prayed there.
