= David Robson (footballer, born 2002) =

Welsh footballer

Personal information
- Full name: David Leslie Robson
- Date of birth: 22 January 2002 (age 24)
- Place of birth: Northallerton, England
- Position: Goalkeeper

Team information
- Current team: Gainsborough Trinity

Youth career
- –2015: Oakville SC
- 2015–2017: Heart of Midlothian
- 2017–2022: Hull City

Senior career*
Years	Team	Apps	(Gls)
2018–2024	Hull City	0	(0)
2018–2019	→ East Yorkshire Carnegie (loan)	14	(0)
2019	→ Stocksbridge Park Steels (loan)	7	(0)
2019	→ Tadcaster Albion (loan)	0	(0)
2019	→ Gainsborough Trinity (loan)	1	(0)
2022	→ Farsley Celtic (loan)	8	(0)
2022–2023	→ Crawley Town (loan)	3	(0)
2023	→ Darlington (loan)	4	(0)
2024	→ Gainsborough Trinity (loan)	4	(0)
2024	Rochdale	8	(0)
2025	Alfreton Town	8	(0)
2025–	Gainsborough Trinity	49	(0)

International career^{‡}
2018	Wales U17	3	(0)
2021	Wales U21	1	(0)
- * Club domestic league appearances and goals as of 21:21, 28 April 2026 (UTC) ‡ National team caps and goals as of 12:07, 29 October 2023 (UTC)

David Leslie Robson (born 22 January 2002) is a professional footballer who plays as a goalkeeper for Gainsborough Trinity.

He previously represented the Wales under-21 national team. He also spent time on loan at non-league clubs East Yorkshire Carnegie, Stocksbridge Park Steels, Tadcaster Albion, Gainsborough Trinity (twice), Farsley Celtic and Darlington, as well as at Crawley Town of EFL League Two, for whom he made his Football League debut.

== Early life and youth career ==
Robson was born in Northallerton, North Yorkshire, to Jeremy and Mary Robson. He began playing football as a five-year-old, and became a goalkeeper at six. In 2008, Jeremy's work took the family to Canada, where they settled in Fergus, Ontario. Robson attended Elora Public School and played football for Oakville SC. In late 2014, the twelve-year-old Robson returned to the United Kingdom for trials with professional football clubs, and the family accepted an offer from Scottish club Heart of Midlothian for him to join their academy. Robson returned to England to join Hull City's academy in 2017 as an under-15, and took up a scholarship with the club in 2018.

== Club career ==
=== Hull City ===
In the early part of his Hull City career, Robson spent spells on loan at several non-league clubs to gain experience of first-team football. As a 16-year-old, he made 14 appearances for East Yorkshire Carnegie in the Northern Counties East Football League Division One. He played seven matches in the last couple of months of the 2018–19 season to help Stocksbridge Park Steels avoid relegation from the Northern Premier League. After a brief stay at Tadcaster Albion, during which he started in one FA Cup match in September 2019, Robson joined Northern Premier League Premier Division club Gainsborough Trinity, making two appearances before returning to his parent club.

In December 2019, Robson signed his first professional contract with Hull City, which was extended to run until 2022. He was an occasional unused substitute for the first team, but his next senior appearance did not come until April 2022, when he played in Farsley Celtic's last eight matches of the 2021–22 season and helped them avoid relegation from the National League North. Hull City took up their one-year option on Robson's contract, and gave him his debut on 9 August 2022, in a 2–1 defeat to Bradford City in the EFL Cup. According to the Hull Live website's player ratings, he "looked nervous and unconvincing in the key moments, not helped by the collapse in front of him first half."

On 19 August 2022, Robson joined League Two club Crawley Town on loan until January 2023. Another loanee, Ellery Balcombe, began the season as first choice, but was injured in the opening fixture and Corey Addai took over the starting spot. Robson played twice in the EFL Trophy before being given his Football League debut by interim manager Lewis Young on 15 October at home to Newport County. Crawley won 2–1, and the Sussex Express website marked him 8 out of 10, "beaten by a superb strike he had no chance of saving. Commanded his box well all afternoon, and came off his line to clear a loose ball on more than occasion. Made some great saves late on." Robson kept his place for two more league matches and a further EFL Trophy outing before Balcombe returned to fitness and the first team, and made no further appearances before his loan expired. He told Hull Live that the loan had not turned out how he had hoped, but experiencing "one of the biggest learning curves in dealing with things that you can't control at times" had been a tough but valuable lesson.

Having signed a one-year deal with Hull City in June 2023, Robson joined another National League North club, Darlington, on 29 September on a month's loan, and went straight into the starting eleven for the following day's FA Cup tie against Scarborough Athletic. He made five appearances and kept one clean sheet, against Blyth Spartans, before returning to Hull when his loan expired.

On 26 February 2024, Robson joined Gainsborough Trinity on a month's loan. On 19 May 2024, Hull announced he would be released in the summer when his contract expired.

=== Rochdale ===
On 7 September 2024, Robson signed for National League club Rochdale on a short-term deal.

=== Alfreton Town ===
On 14 January 2025, Robson joined National League North side Alfreton Town. He departed the club by mutual consent in March 2025.

== International career ==
While a member of Heart of Midlothian's academy, in early 2017, Robson played for Wales at under-15 level, and by the time he played for the under-16s in September, he was on the books of Hull City. He continued through the age groups, but missed out on the under-19s because of COVID-19-related restrictions.

Robson made his Wales under-21 debut in September 2022, playing the first half of the 2–0 friendly match defeat against Austria.

== Career statistics ==
As of match played 15 March 2025

Appearances and goals by club, season and competition
Club	Season	League			FA Cup		League Cup		Other		Total	
Club	Season	Division	Apps	Goals	Apps	Goals	Apps	Goals	Apps	Goals	Apps	Goals
Hull City	2018–19	Championship	0	0	0	0	0	0	—		0	0
Hull City	2019–20	Championship	0	0	—		0	0	—		0	0
Hull City	2020–21	League One	0	0	0	0	0	0	0	0	0	0
Hull City	2021–22	Championship	0	0	0	0	0	0	—		0	0
Hull City	2022–23	Championship	0	0	0	0	1	0	—		1	0
Hull City	2023–24	Championship	0	0	—		0	0	—		0	0
Hull City	Total		0	0	0	0	1	0	0	0	1	0
East Yorkshire Carnegie (loan)	2018–19	Northern Counties East League; Division One	14	0	—		—		1 (Note: Appearance in East Riding Senior Cup)	0	15	0
Stocksbridge Park Steels (loan)	2018–19	Northern Premier League (NPL); Division One East	7	0	—		—		—		7	0
Tadcaster Albion (loan)	2019–20	NPL Division One North West	0	0	1	0	—				1	0
Gainsborough Trinity (loan)	2019–20	NPL Premier Division	1	0	—		—		1 (Note: Appearance in FA Trophy)	0	2	0
Farsley Celtic (loan)	2021–22	National League North	8	0	—		—		—		8	0
Crawley Town (loan)	2022–23	League Two	3	0	—		0	0	3 (Note: Appearances in EFL Trophy)	0	6	0
Darlington (loan)	2023–24	National League North	4	0	1	0	—		—		5	0
Gainsborough Trinity (loan)	2023–24	NPL Premier Division	4	0	—		—		—		4	0
Rochdale	2024–25	National League	8	0	2	0	—		—		10	0
Alfreton Town	2024–25	National League North	8	0	—		—		—		8	0
Career total			57	0	4	0	1	0	5	0	67	0
