= 2022–23 Hull City A.F.C. season =

English football club season

Hull City
2022–23 season
- Owner: Acun Medya
- Chairman: Acun Ilıcalı
- Manager: Shota Arveladze (until 30 September); Andy Dawson (interim, 30 September – 3 November); Liam Rosenior (from 3 November)
- Stadium: MKM Stadium
- Championship: 15th
- FA Cup: Third round
- EFL Cup: First round
- Top goalscorer: League: Óscar Estupiñán (13); All: Óscar Estupiñán (13)
- Highest home attendance: 23,432 (v Rotherham United, 1 April)
- Lowest home attendance: 14,669 (v Wigan Athletic, 5 October)
- Average home league attendance: 17,973
- Biggest win: 4–1 (v Wigan Athletic, 2 January); 3–0 (v Queens Park Rangers, 28 January)
- Biggest defeat: 2–5 (v West Bromwich Albion, 20 August); 0–3 (v Stoke City, 13 September); 0–3 (v Swansea City, 17 September)
Home colours	Away colours	Third colours

The 2022–23 season was the 119th season in the existence of Hull City Association Football Club and the club's second consecutive season in the Championship. In addition to the domestic league, they also competed in the FA Cup and the EFL Cup.

== Events ==
- On 17 June 2022, Harvey Cartwright agreed to join Peterborough United on a season long loan.
- On 28 June 2022, George Honeyman moved to Millwall for an undisclosed fee.
- On 28 June 2022, Tobias Figueiredo signed a two-year contract with the club as a free transfer following his release by Nottingham Forest.
- On 29 June 2022, George Moncur moved to Leyton Orient on a three-year deal for an undisclosed fee.
- On 1 July 2022, Ozan Tufan, from Fenerbahçe, signed a three-year deal for an undisclosed fee.
- On 4 July 2022 Nathan Baxter re-joined the club on a season-long loan from Chelsea.
- On 5 July 2022 Jack Leckie signed a two-year deal on a free transfer from Burnley.
- On 6 July 2022, Vaughn Covil signed a one-year deal on a free transfer from Forest Green Rovers.
- On 6 July 2022, Conor Sellars joined as Under-23 Lead Professional Development Phase Coach.
- On 8 July 2022, Jean Michaël Seri signed a three-year contract with the club on free transfer after being released by Fulham.
- On 9 July 2022, Allahyar Sayyadmanesh of Fenerbahçe signed a four-year contract with the club for an undisclosed fee.
- On 9 July 2022, Brandon Fleming signed a three-year contract extension with the club.
- On 12 July 2022, Keane Lewis-Potter signed a six-year deal with Brentford for an undisclosed, but club-record, fee.
- On 13 July 2022, Óscar Estupiñán of Vitória S.C. signed a three-year deal with the club for an undisclosed fee.
- On 20 July 2022, Doğukan Sinik signed a three-year deal with Hull, for an undisclosed fee from Antalyaspor.
- On 22 July 2022, the club announced that the under-21's would be playing their home games at North Ferriby's ground, also that the academy had extended their lease of the ground at Bishop Burton College for a further two-years.
- On 23 July 2022, Benjamin Tetteh signed a two-year deal with the club on a free transfer from Yeni Malatyaspor.
- On 26 July 2022, the club announced that CEO James Rodwell had left the club.
- On 26 July 2022, the contract of Festus Arthur was terminated by mutual consent so he could join FC Halifax Town.
- On 28 July 2022, Andy Smith signed a new two-year contract with the club and moved on a season-long loan to Grimsby Town.
- On 28 July 2022, Lewie Coyle was appointed club captain for the season.
- On 3 August 2022, Jim Simms from Oldham Athletic signed a two-year deal with the academy.
- On 9 August 2022, Thimothée Lo-Tutala signed a three-year deal with the club after compensation was agreed with Tottenham Hotspur.
- On 15 August 2022, Louie Chorlton signed a six-month contract with the academy from Bradford City, in January 2023 the contract was extended to the end of the season.
- On 16 August 2022, Will Jarvis joined Scarborough Athletic on a month-long loan spell.
- On 18 August 2022, Ryan Woods, signed a three-year deal with the option of a one-year extension for an undisclosed fee from Birmingham City.
- On 18 August 2022, Jacob Greaves signed a four-year contract extension with the club, with the option of a further year.
- On 18 August 2022, Harry Fisk joined Tadcaster Albion on a six-month loan deal.
- On 19 August 2022, David Robson joined Crawley Town on a six-month loan deal.
- On 22 August 2022, Mallik Wilks signed for Sheffield Wednesday for an undisclosed fee.
- On 23 August 2022, Salah-Eddine Oulad M'Hand joined on a season-long loan from Arsenal.
- On 26 August 2022, Cyrus Christie signed a two-year deal, on a free transfer from Fulham.
- On 1 September 2022, McCauley Snelgrove joined Crusaders on a season-long loan, but was cut short when he was recalled in January 2023.
- On 1 September 2022, Adama Traoré joined on a two-year deal as a free transfer from Hatayspor.
- On 1 September 2022, Xavier Simons joined the club on a season-long loan spell from Chelsea.
- On 1 September 2022, Dimitrios Pelkas joined the club on a season-long loan spell from Fenerbahçe.
- On 1 September 2022, Jevon Mills joined Gateshead on loan until January 2023.
- On 1 September 2022, Harvey Vale was brought in on a season-long loan from Chelsea, but this was cut short when he returned to Chelsea on 23 January 2023.
- On 30 September 2022, head coach Shota Arveladze was sacked after a run of four league defeats and Andy Dawson was appointed as interim head coach. At the same time assistant head coach, Peter van der Veen left the club.
- On 30 September 2022, Ben Voase joined Barton Town to gain work experience.
- On 18 October 2022, ahead of the trip to Blackpool, former Hull City player Robbie Stockdale was brought in, on a temporary basis, to assist Andy Dawson.
- On 19 October 2022, the club confirmed that Beri Pardo had been appointed head of performance strategy.
- On 3 November 2022, the club announced Liam Rosenior as the new head coach on a two-and-a-half-year deal.
- On 4 November 2022, the club announced that Justin Walker would be a new assistant head coach working alongside Andy Dawson.
- On 4 November 2022, Oliver Green moved on a month-long loan spell to Marske United.
- On 4 November 2022, Josh Hinds and Tom Nixon moved on a month-long loan spell to Boston United.
- On 24 November 2022, Ben Warner joined the backroom staff as coach analyst.
- On 25 November 2022, Onur Zayim joined the backroom staff of the academy as an Under-15s and Under-16s coach.
- On 9 December 2022, Andy Cannon signed a two-and-a-half-year deal with Wrexham for an undisclosed fee.
- On 16 December 2022, Harry Lovick joined Marske United on a month-long loan spell.
- On 23 December 2022, Jim Simms joined Buxton on a month-long loan spell.
- On 5 January 2023, Billy Chadwick joined Boston United on a month-long loan spell, which was extended for a further month on 2 February 2023 and on 6 March 2023 extended for the rest of the season.
- On 5 January 2023, Randell Williams moved to Bolton Wanderers on a two-and-a-half-year deal for an undisclosed fee.
- On 6 January, Brandon Fleming joined Oxford United on loan for the rest of the season.
- On 6 January 2023, Aaron Connolly joined the club on loan from Brighton & Hove Albion for the rest of the season.
- On 12 January 2023, Doğukan Sinik joined Antalyaspor on loan until the end of the season.
- On 16 January 2023, Harvey Cartwright loan at Peterborough United was cut short and David Robson loan at Crawley Town ended.
- On 19 January 2023, Malcolm Ebiowei joined on loan from Crystal Palace until the end of the season.
- On 19 January 2023, Robbie Stockdale left his coaching position to become Assistant Head Coach at M.K. Dons.
- On 26 January 2023, Harvey Cartwright moved to Wycombe Wanderers on loan until the end of the season.
- On 27 January 2023, Callum Jones signed a new two-and-a-half-year contract with Hull City.
- On 31 January 2023, Tyler Smith joined Oxford United on loan until the end of the season.
- On 31 January 2023, Salah-Eddine Oulad M'Hand returned to his parent club Arsenal.
- On 31 January 2023, James Scott moved to Exeter City for an undisclosed fee.
- On 31 January 2023, Yuriel Celi of Carlos A. Mannucci signed a two-and-a-half-year deal with the club for an undisclosed fee, he was then loaned to Club Universitario de Deportes until the end of the year.
- On 31 January 2023, Josh Emmanuel signed a deal with Grimsby Town for an undisclosed fee.
- On 31 January 2023, Harry Vaughan of Oldham Athletic joined on an 18-month contract for an undisclosed fee.
- On 31 January 2023, Karl Darlow of Newcastle United joined on loan until the end of the season.
- On 2 February 2023, Jake Leake joined Scunthorpe United on loan for three-months.
- On 10 February 2023, Jevon Mills joined Solihull Moors on a 28-day loan spell, and Tom Nixon returned to Boston United on loan until the end of the season.
- On 14 February 2023, McCauley Snelgrove joined Spennymoor Town on a month-long loan spell.
- On 17 February 2023, Louie Chorlton and Josh Hinds joined Bradford (Park Avenue) on a month-long loan spell.
- On 1 March 2023, goalkeeper Kornel Misciur moved to Liverpool for an undisclosed fee.
- On 6 March 2023, former player David Meyler joined the academy staff as a casual Under-15s coach.
- On 8 March 2023, Matty Jacob signed a new one-and-a-half-year contract with the club.
- On 13 March 2023, Jevon Mills loan at Solihull Moors was extended for another month.
- On 16 March 2023, loanee Xavier Simons, from Chelsea, signed a three-year deal for an undisclosed fee.
- On 6 April 2023, goalkeeper Thimothée Lo-Tutala joined Stevenage F.C. on an emergency loan deal.
- On 18 April 2023, Sean McLoughlin signed a new three-year contract with the club.
- On 17 May 2023, Alfie Jones signed a new three-year deal with the club.
- On 19 June 2023, Lewie Coyle signed a new three-year deal with the club.
- On 19 June 2023, Billy Chadwick signed a one-year deal with Stockport County following his release by Hull City at the end of the season.
- On 20 June 2023, David Robson signed a one-year deal with the club.
- On 21 June 2023, Regan Slater signed a three-year deal with the club.
- On 23 June 2023, Harry Vaughan signed a three-year deal with the club.
- In June 2023, Justin Walker gained his coaching UEFA Pro Licence.

== Squad ==
#	Name	Position	Nationality	Place of birth	Date of birth (age) (Note: Players' ages listed as they were on 1 July 2022, the official start date of the 2022–23 season)	Previous club	Date signed	Fee (Note: All fees converted into GBP)
Goalkeepers
1	Matt Ingram	GK	(England)	High Wycombe	18 December 1993 (age 28)	Queens Park Rangers	1 July 2019	Free
12	Karl Darlow	GK	(England)	Northampton	8 October 1990 (age 31)	Newcastle United	31 January 2023	Loan
13	Nathan Baxter	GK	(England)	Westminster	8 November 1998 (age 23)	Chelsea	4 July 2022	Loan
34	David Robson	GK	(Wales)	(England) Northallerton	22 January 2002 (age 20)	Academy	23 December 2019	—
Defenders
2	Lewie Coyle (c)	RB	(England)	Hull	15 October 1995 (age 26)	Fleetwood Town	7 August 2020	£350,000
3	Callum Elder	LB	(Australia)	Sydney	27 January 1995 (age 27)	Leicester City	8 August 2019	£225,000
4	Jacob Greaves	CB	(England)	Cottingham	12 September 2000 (age 21)	Academy	1 July 2020	—
5	Alfie Jones	CB	(England)	Bristol	7 October 1997 (age 24)	Southampton	4 September 2020	Undisclosed
6	Tobias Figueiredo	CB	(Portugal)	Sátão	2 February 1994 (age 28)	Nottingham Forest	28 June 2022	Free
17	Sean McLoughlin	CB	(Republic of Ireland)	Cork	13 September 1996 (age 25)	(Republic of Ireland) Cork City	26 July 2019	£225,000
29	Matty Jacob	LB	(England)	Barnsley	3 June 2001 (age 21)	Academy	1 July 2019	—
33	Cyrus Christie	RB	(Republic of Ireland)	(England) Coventry	30 September 1992 (age 29)	Fulham	26 August 2022	Free
Midfielders
7	Ozan Tufan	AM	(Turkey)	Orhaneli	23 March 1995 (age 27)	(Turkey) Fenerbahçe	1 July 2022	£3,000,000
8	Greg Docherty	CM	(Scotland)	Milngavie	10 September 1996 (age 25)	(Scotland) Rangers	20 August 2020	£400,000
14	Harry Vaughan	AM	(Republic of Ireland)	(England) Trafford	6 April 2004 (age 18)	Oldham Athletic	31 January 2023	Youth Fee
15	Ryan Woods	DM	(England)	Norton Canes	13 December 1993 (age 28)	Birmingham City	18 August 2022	Undisclosed
18	Adama Traoré	AM	(Mali)	Bamako	28 June 1995 (age 27)	(Turkey) Hatayspor	1 September 2022	Free
24	Jean Michaël Seri	CM	(Ivory Coast)	Grand-Béréby	19 July 1991 (age 30)	Fulham	8 July 2022	Free
27	Regan Slater	CM	(England)	Gleadless	11 September 1999 (age 22)	Sheffield United	27 January 2022	£50,000
28	Callum Jones	CM	(Wales)	(England) Birkenhead	5 April 2001 (age 21)	Bury	20 August 2019	Youth Fee
35	Xavier Simons	DM	(England)	Hammersmith	20 February 2003 (age 19)	Chelsea	1 September 2022	Loan
Forwards
9	Allahyar Sayyadmanesh	CF	(Iran)	Amol	29 June 2001 (age 21)	(Turkey) Fenerbahçe	9 July 2022	£3,800,000
10	Malcolm Ebiowei	RW	(England)	Lambeth	4 September 2003 (age 18)	Crystal Palace	19 January 2023	Loan
16	Ryan Longman	RW	(England)	Redhill	6 November 2000 (age 21)	Brighton & Hove Albion	31 January 2022	£800,000
19	Óscar Estupiñán	CF	(Colombia)	Cali	29 December 1996 (age 25)	(Portugal) Vitoria de Guimarães	13 July 2022	Free
20	Dimitrios Pelkas	LW	(Greece)	Giannitsa	26 October 1993 (age 28)	(Turkey) Fenerbahçe	1 September 2022	Loan
30	Benjamin Tetteh	CF	(Ghana)	Accra	10 July 1997 (age 24)	(Turkey) Yeni Malatyaspor	23 July 2022	Free
36	Will Jarvis	RW	(England)	York	17 December 2002 (age 19)	Academy	1 July 2021	—
44	Aaron Connolly	CF	(Republic of Ireland)	Oranmore	28 January 2000 (age 22)	Brighton & Hove Albion	6 January 2023	Loan
49	Vaughn Covil	RW	(United States)	San Diego	26 July 2003 (age 18)	Forest Green Rovers	6 July 2022	Free

=== Out on loan ===
#	Name	Position	Nationality	Place of birth	Date of birth (age)	Previous club	Date signed	Fee
11	Doğukan Sinik	LW	(Turkey)	Antalya	21 January 1999 (age 23)	(Turkey) Antalyaspor	20 July 2022	£4,000,000
21	Brandon Fleming	LB	(England)	Hull	3 December 1999 (age 22)	Academy	1 July 2019	—
26	Andy Smith	CB	(England)	Banbury	11 September 2001 (age 20)	Academy	1 July 2021	—
32	Thimothée Lo-Tutala	GK	(France)	Gonesse	13 February 2003 (age 19)	Tottenham Hotspur	9 August 2022	Free
—	Harvey Cartwright	GK	(England)	Grimsby	9 May 2002 (age 20)	Academy	23 December 2019	—
—	Yuriel Celi	CM	(Peru)	Callao	20 February 2002 (age 20)	(Peru) Mannucci	31 January 2023	Undisclosed

== Transfers ==
=== Transfers in ===
Date	Pos	Player	Transferred from	Fee	Ref.
1 July 2022 (Note: The transfer was announced on 28 June, and would become official on 1 July, once his Nottingham Forest contract expired.)	CB	(Portugal) Tobias Figueiredo	(England) Nottingham Forest	Free Transfer	
1 July 2022	MF	(Turkey) Ozan Tufan	(Turkey) Fenerbahçe	Undisclosed	
5 July 2022	CB	(England) Jack Leckie	(England) Burnley	Free Transfer	
6 July 2022	RW	(United States) Vaughn Covil	(England) Forest Green Rovers	Free Transfer	
8 July 2022	MF	(Ivory Coast) Jean Michaël Seri	(England) Fulham	Free Transfer	
9 July 2022	CF	(Iran) Allahyar Sayyadmanesh	(Turkey) Fenerbahçe	Undisclosed	
13 July 2022	CF	(Colombia) Óscar Estupiñán	(Portugal) Vitória S.C.	Undisclosed	
20 July 2022	LW	(Turkey) Doğukan Sinik	(Turkey) Antalyaspor	Undisclosed	
23 July 2022	CF	(Ghana) Benjamin Tetteh	(Turkey) Yeni Malatyaspor	Free Transfer	
3 August 2022	FW	(England) Jim Simms	(England) Oldham Athletic	Free Transfer	
9 August 2022	GK	(France) Thimothée Lo-Tutala	(England) Tottenham Hotspur	Compensation	
15 August 2022	RB	(England) Louie Chorlton	(England) Bradford City	Undisclosed	
18 August 2022	DM	(England) Ryan Woods	(England) Birmingham City	Undisclosed	
26 August 2022	RB	(Republic of Ireland) Cyrus Christie	(England) Fulham	Free Transfer	
1 September 2022	AM	(Mali) Adama Traoré	(Turkey) Hatayspor	Free Transfer	
31 January 2023	AM	(Peru) Yuriel Celi	(Peru) Carlos A. Mannucci	Undisclosed	
31 January 2023	AM	(Republic of Ireland) Harry Vaughan	(England) Oldham Athletic	Undisclosed	
16 March 2023	DM	(England) Xavier Simons	(England) Chelsea	Undisclosed	

=== Transfers out ===
Date	Pos	Player	Transferred to	Fee	Ref.
28 June 2022	MF	(England) George Honeyman	(England) Millwall	Undisclosed	
29 June 2022	CM	(England) George Moncur	(England) Leyton Orient	Undisclosed	
30 June 2022	MF	(England) Louis Beckett	Unattached	Released	
30 June 2022	DF	(England) Henry Curtis	Unattached	Released	
30 June 2022	MF	(England) Sam Deacon	Unattached	Released	
30 June 2022	RW	(Wales) Rio Dyer	Unattached	Released	
30 June 2022	CF	(England) Tom Eaves	(England) Rotherham United	Released	
30 June 2022	DM	(England) Tom Huddlestone	(England) Manchester United	Released	
30 June 2022	MF	(England) Billy Leach	Unattached	Released	
30 June 2022	LW	(Egypt) Ahmed Salam	(England) Alfreton Town	Released	
30 June 2022	CM	(England) Richard Smallwood	(England) Bradford City	Released	
12 July 2022	LW	(England) Keane Lewis-Potter	(England) Brentford	Undisclosed	
26 July 2022	DF	(Germany) Festus Arthur	(England) FC Halifax Town	Mutual Consent	
22 August 2022	RW	(England) Mallik Wilks	(England) Sheffield Wednesday	Undisclosed	
9 December 2022	CM	(England) Andy Cannon	(England) Wrexham	Undisclosed	
5 January 2023	RM	(England) Randell Williams	(England) Bolton Wanderers	Undisclosed	
31 January 2023	RB	(England) Josh Emmanuel	(England) Grimsby Town	Undisclosed	
31 January 2023	CF	(Scotland) James Scott	(England) Exeter City	Undisclosed	
1 March 2023	GK	(England) Kornel Misciur	(England) Liverpool	Undisclosed	
19 June 2023	CF	(England) Billy Chadwick	(England) Stockport County	Free Transfer	

=== Loans in ===
Date	Pos	Player	Loaned from	On loan until	Ref.
4 July 2022	GK	(England) Nathan Baxter	(England) Chelsea	End of Season	
23 August 2022	CM	(Netherlands) Salah-Eddine Oulad M'Hand	(England) Arsenal	31 January 2023	
1 September 2022	AM	(Greece) Dimitrios Pelkas	(Turkey) Fenerbahçe	End of Season	
1 September 2022	DM	(England) Xavier Simons	(England) Chelsea	End of Season	
1 September 2022	AM	(England) Harvey Vale	(England) Chelsea	23 January 2023	
6 January 2023	CF	(Republic of Ireland) Aaron Connolly	(England) Brighton & Hove Albion	End of Season	
19 January 2023	MF	(England) Malcolm Ebiowei	(England) Crystal Palace	End of Season	
31 January 2023	GK	(England) Karl Darlow	(England) Newcastle United	End of Season	

=== Loans out ===
Date	Pos	Player	Loaned to	On loan until	Ref.
17 June 2022	GK	(England) Harvey Cartwright	(England) Peterborough United	16 January 2023	
28 July 2022	CB	(England) Andy Smith	(England) Grimsby Town	End of Season	
16 August 2022	CF	(England) Will Jarvis	(England) Scarborough Athletic	16 September 2022	
18 August 2022	GK	(England) Harry Fisk	(England) Tadcaster Albion	1 January 2023	
19 August 2022	GK	(Wales) David Robson	(England) Crawley Town	16 January 2023	
1 September 2022	CB	(Republic of Ireland) Jevon Mills	(England) Gateshead	1 January 2023	
1 September 2022	FW	(England) McCauley Snelgrove	(Northern Ireland) Crusaders	January 2023	
30 September 2022	GK	(England) Ben Voase	(England) Barton Town	Work Experience	
4 November 2022	MF	(England) Oliver Green	(England) Marske United	4 December 2022	
4 November 2022	CF	(England) Josh Hinds	(England) Boston United	4 December 2022	
4 November 2022	RB	(England) Tom Nixon	(England) Boston United	4 December 2022	
16 December 2022	MF	(England) Harry Lovick	(England) Marske United	16 January 2023	
23 December 2022	FW	(England) Jim Simms	(England) Buxton	23 January 2023	
5 January 2023	CF	(England) Billy Chadwick	(England) Boston United	End of Season	
6 January 2023	DF	(England) Brandon Fleming	(England) Oxford United	End of Season	
12 January 2023	LW	(Turkey) Doğukan Sinik	(Turkey) Antalyaspor	End of Season	
26 January 2023	GK	(England) Harvey Cartwright	(England) Wycombe Wanderers	End of Season	
31 January 2023	AM	(Peru) Yuriel Celi	(Peru) Club Universitario de Deportes	31 December 2023	
31 January 2023	CF	(England) Tyler Smith	(England) Oxford United	End of Season	
2 February 2023	LB	(England) Jake Leake	(England) Scunthorpe United	27 April 2023	
10 February 2023	CB	(Republic of Ireland) Jevon Mills	(England) Solihull Moors	10 April 2023	
10 February 2023	RB	(England) Tom Nixon	(England) Boston United	End of Season	
14 February 2023	FW	(England) McCauley Snelgrove	(England) Spennymoor Town	14 March 2023	
17 February 2023	DF	(England) Louie Chorlton	(England) Bradford (Park Avenue)	18 March 2023	
17 February 2023	CF	(England) Josh Hinds	(England) Bradford (Park Avenue)	18 March 2023	
6 April 2023	GK	(France) Thimothée Lo-Tutala	(England) Stevenage	13 April 2023	

== Pre-season and friendlies ==
The first pre-season matches announced on 17 June 2022 would be against Cambridge United and Peterborough United, both to be played on 23 July 2022, with the players split between the 2 games. The team reported back for the start of pre-season training on 20 June 2022. The club later announced pre-season games in Turkey and Spain against Fenerbahçe, Brighton & Hove Albion U23s and Málaga. The team will travel to Turkey on 8 July 2022, for the friendly match against Fenerbahçe before relocating to the Marbella Football Centre in Spain for an eight-day warm weather training camp. They will play two matches on 16 July 2022 at the centre, before returning home on 18 July 2022. On 2 July 2022, it was announced that a pre-season match against Leicester City would be played at home on 20 July 2022, in what will be known as the Corendon Cup.

Win Draw Loss Fixtures

10 July 2022 Friendly	Fenerbahçe	2–0	Hull City	Adapazarı, Turkey
19:30 TRT	Güler 87'; Dursun 89'	Report		Stadium: Sakarya Atatürk Stadium; Attendance: 25,000

16 July 2022 Friendly	Hull City	2–1	Brighton & Hove Albion U23s	Marbella, Spain
10:30 CEST	T. Smith 69', 81'	Report	Peupion 86'	Stadium: Marbella Football Centre; Attendance: 0
Note: Held behind closed doors

16 July 2022 Friendly	Málaga	1–3	Hull City	Marbella, Spain
18:30 CEST	Caro 55'	Report	Greaves 51'; Jones 59'; Coyle 62'	Stadium: Marbella Football Centre

20 July 2022 Friendly	Hull City	0–4	Leicester City	Kingston upon Hull
19:45 BST		Report	Daka 29'; Barnes 47'; Fofana 51'; Maddison 84'	Stadium: MKM Stadium; Attendance: 12,993
Note: Corendon Cup

23 July 2022 Friendly	Cambridge United	1–2	Hull City	Cambridge
12:00 BST	Smith 5'	Report	Williams 43'; T. Smith 62' (pen.)	Stadium: Abbey Stadium

23 July 2022 Friendly	Peterborough United	3–0	Hull City	Peterborough
16:00 BST	Szmodics 26', 48'; Randall 46'	Report		Stadium: Weston Homes Stadium

== Mid-season and friendlies ==
The club took the opportunity of the World Cup break for a week-long training camp in Turkey. The team were accompanied on the trip by 320 supporters on an all expenses paid holiday courtesy of club owner Acun Ilıcalı. Two friendly matches were planned for the trip, 30 November 2022 against İstanbul Başakşehir and 3 December 2022, against Trabzonspor.

Win Draw Loss Fixtures

30 November 2022 Friendly	İstanbul Başakşehir	1–1	Hull City	Antalya, Turkey
15:00 TRT	Aleksić 14' (pen.)	Report	Smith 74'	Stadium: Regnum Carya

3 December 2022 Friendly	Trabzonspor	1–1	Hull City	Antalya, Turkey
1:00 GMT	Trézéguet 4'	Report	Tufan 70' (pen.)	Stadium: Regnum Carya

== Competitions ==
=== Overall record ===
Competition	First match	Last match	Starting round	Final position	Record							
Competition	First match	Last match	Starting round	Final position	Pld	W	D	L	GF	GA	GD	Win %
Championship	30 July 2022	8 May 2023	Matchday 1	15th	46	14	16	16	51	61	−10	30.43
FA Cup	7 January 2023		Third round	Third round	1	0	0	1	0	2	−2	0.00
EFL Cup	9 August 2022		First round	First round	1	0	0	1	1	2	−1	0.00
Total					48	14	16	18	52	65	−13	29.17

Source: Soccerway

=== Championship ===
==== League table ====
Pos	Team	Pld	W	D	L	GF	GA	GD	Pts
12	Preston North End	46	17	12	17	45	59	−14	63
13	Norwich City	46	17	11	18	57	54	+3	62
14	Bristol City	46	15	14	17	55	56	−1	59
15	Hull City	46	14	16	16	51	61	−10	58
16	Stoke City	46	14	11	21	55	54	+1	53
17	Birmingham City	46	14	11	21	47	58	−11	53
18	Huddersfield Town	46	14	11	21	47	62	−15	53

Source: EFL Official Website
Rules for classification: 1) Points; 2) Goal difference; 3) Number of goals scored; 4) Head-to-head results; 5) Wins; 6) Away goals; 7) Penalty points (sec 9.5); 8) 12-point sending off offences

==== Results summary ====
Overall								Home						Away					
Pld	W	D	L	GF	GA	GD	Pts	W	D	L	GF	GA	GD	W	D	L	GF	GA	GD
46	14	16	16	51	61	−10	58	9	6	8	24	27	−3	5	10	8	27	34	−7

Source: Soccerway

==== Results by round ====
Matchday	1	2	3	4	5	6	7	8	9	10	11	12	13	14	15	16	17	18	19	20	21	22	23	24	25	26	27	28	29	30	31	32	33	34	35	36	37	38	39	40	41	42	43	44	45	46
Ground	H	A	H	A	A	H	A	H	H	A	H	H	A	H	A	A	H	H	A	A	H	A	H	H	A	A	H	A	H	H	A	A	H	A	H	A	H	A	H	A	H	A	A	H	H	A
Result	W	D	W	D	L	W	L	L	L	L	L	W	L	L	W	W	L	L	D	W	L	D	D	D	W	W	D	L	W	W	D	L	D	L	W	D	L	D	D	D	W	D	L	W	D	D
Position	2	6	1	2	6	3	7	12	15	20	20	17	20	21	19	16	18	21	21	19	20	20	21	21	18	16	16	16	15	12	11	12	13	16	13	15	15	15	17	17	16	15	16	15	14	15

Source: Soccerway
A = Away; H = Home; W = Win; D = Draw; L = Loss; P = Postponed

==== Matches ====
Win Draw Loss Fixtures Postponed

The league fixtures were announced on 23 June 2022. Hull start the season with a home game against Bristol City and finish the season away to Luton Town. Due to the 2022 FIFA World Cup in Qatar, the Championship will take a 4-week break mid-season during the tournament. The break will commence in mid-November and the first round of fixtures after the World Cup will be held on 10 December. In January the EFL announced the postponement of the final match of the season to 15:00 on 8 May 2023 to avoid a clash with the coronation of Charles III on the Saturday.

30 July 2022 1	Hull City	2–1	Bristol City	Kingston upon Hull
15:00 BST	Tufan 72' (pen.); Seri 90+3'	Report	Weimann 30'	Stadium: MKM Stadium; Attendance: 16,667; Referee: Dean Whitestone

6 August 2022 2	Preston North End	0–0	Hull City	Deepdale, Preston
15:00 BST	Browne (yellow card) 90+5'	Report	Slater (yellow card) 23'; Sayyadmanesh (yellow card) 43'; Jones (yellow card) 74'; Seri (yellow card) 84'	Stadium: Deepdale; Attendance: 15,816; Referee: Jeremy Simpson

13 August 2022 3	Hull City	2–1	Norwich City	Kingston upon Hull
15:00 BST	Estupiñán 43', 62'; Sayyadmanesh (yellow card) 90+6'	Report	Omobamidele (yellow card) 23'; Núñez 72'	Stadium: MKM Stadium; Attendance: 17,028; Referee: James Linington

16 August 2022 4	Burnley	1–1	Hull City	Burnley
19:45 BST	Rodriguez 34'; Brownhill (yellow card) 89'	Report	Tetteh (yellow card) 11'; Tufan 25'; Jones (yellow card) 68'; Elder (yellow card) 90+6'	Stadium: Turf Moor; Attendance: 18,209; Referee: Bobby Madley

20 August 2022 5	West Bromwich Albion	5–2	Hull City	West Bromwich
15:00 BST	Elder 37' (o.g.); Swift 48'; Furlong 55'; Grant 70' (pen.); O'Shea 85'	Report	Estupiñán (yellow card) 34', (goal) 77', 90'; Coyle (yellow card) 53'; Figueiredo (yellow card) 69'	Stadium: The Hawthorns; Attendance: 22,003; Referee: James Bell

27 August 2022 6	Hull City	3–2	Coventry City	Kingston upon Hull
15:00 BST	Estupiñán 11', 42', 56'; Woods (yellow card) 49'; Slater (yellow card) 81'; Ingram (yellow card) 90'	Report	Godden 29' (pen.), 69'; Rose (yellow card) 58'; McFadzean (yellow card) 82'	Stadium: MKM Stadium; Attendance: 17,874; Referee: Oliver Langford

30 August 2022 7	Queens Park Rangers	3–1	Hull City	White City, London
19:45 BST	Chair 10'; Laird 15'; Willock 40'; Roberts (yellow card) 90+4'	Report	Greaves (yellow card) 83'; Smith 85'	Stadium: Loftus Road; Attendance: 12,716; Referee: Steve Martin

4 September 2022 8	Hull City	0–2	Sheffield United	Kingston upon Hull
15:00 BST	Figueiredo (yellow card) 90+8'	Report	McBurnie 20'; Ahmedhodžić (yellow card) 58'; Berge 75'; Brewster (yellow card) 90+8'	Stadium: MKM Stadium; Attendance: 20,426; Referee: Matt Donohue

10 September 2022	Cardiff City	Postponed	Hull City	Leckwith, Cardiff
15:00 BST				Stadium: Cardiff City Stadium
Note: Death of Queen Elizabeth II

13 September 2022 9	Hull City	0–3	Stoke City	Kingston upon Hull
19:45 BST	Seri (yellow card) 39'; Pelkas (yellow card) 84'	Report	Baker 25', 64'; Wilmot 45'; Delap (yellow card) 75'	Stadium: MKM Stadium; Attendance: 15,627; Referee: Leigh Doughty

17 September 2022 10	Swansea City	3–0	Hull City	Landore, Swansea
12:30 BST	Manning 61'; Cundle 64'; Wood (yellow card) 77'; Piroe 85'	Report	Slater (yellow card) 45+4'; Docherty (yellow card) 79'	Stadium: Swansea.com Stadium; Attendance: 15,207; Referee: Keith Stroud

30 September 2022 11	Hull City	0–2	Luton Town	Kingston upon Hull
20:00 BST	Woods (yellow card) 35'	Report	Jones 6' (o.g.); Adebayo (yellow card) 27'; Lansbury 44'; Bree (yellow card) 56'; Morris (yellow card) 67'	Stadium: MKM Stadium; Attendance: 15,730; Referee: James Linington

5 October 2022 12	Hull City	2–1	Wigan Athletic	Kingston upon Hull
19:45 BST	Pelkas 21'; Coyle (yellow card) 23'; Elder (yellow card) 45+2'; Estupiñán 65'; Slater (yellow card) 89'	Report	Keane 14'; Magennis (yellow card) 23'	Stadium: MKM Stadium; Attendance: 14,669; Referee: Andy Woolmer

9 October 2022 13	Huddersfield Town	2–0	Hull City	Huddersfield
12:00 BST	Coyle 29' (o.g.); Helik 51'; Nakayama (yellow card) 65'; Thomas (yellow card) 74'; Mahoney (yellow card) 82'; Ondo (yellow card) 90+7'	Report	Slater (yellow card) 50'; Christie (yellow card) 60'; Longman (yellow card) 68'	Stadium: John Smith's Stadium; Attendance: 18,628; Referee: Tim Robinson

16 October 2022 14	Hull City	0–2	Birmingham City	Kingston upon Hull
15:00 BST	Greaves (yellow card) 43'; Sinik (yellow card) 53'; Williams (yellow card) 66'; Baxter (yellow card) 73'	Report	Deeney 14' (pen.); Colin (yellow card) 27'; Bielik (yellow card) 33'; Bacuna 47', (yellow card) 70'	Stadium: MKM Stadium; Attendance: 16,587; Referee: Leigh Doughty

19 October 2022 15	Blackpool	1–3	Hull City	Blackpool
19:45 BST	Dougall 31'; Wright (yellow card) 45+2'; Madine (yellow card) 48'; Connolly (yellow card) 81'	Report	Longman 26', (yellow card) 38'; Slater (yellow card) 43', (goal) 79'; Docherty 45+3'; Greaves (yellow card) 51'; Pelkas (yellow card) 78'	Stadium: Bloomfield Road; Attendance: 9,884; Referee: Josh Smith

22 October 2022 16	Rotherham United	2–4	Hull City	Rotherham
15:00 BST	Barlaser 45+2'; Odoffin (yellow card) 49'; Kelly 89'	Report	Greaves 44'; Christie 52'; Longman 59'; Tufan 85'	Stadium: New York Stadium; Attendance: 11,220; Referee: Steve Martin

29 October 2022 17	Hull City	0–1	Blackburn Rovers	Kingston upon Hull
15:00 BST	Woods (yellow card) 29'; Figueiredo (yellow card) 78'	Report	Szmodics 15'; Wharton (yellow card) 61'	Stadium: MKM Stadium; Attendance: 18,843; Referee: David Webb

1 November 2022 18	Hull City	1–3	Middlesbrough	Kingston upon Hull
19:45 GMT	Christie 60'; Figueiredo (yellow card) 81'	Report	Hackney (yellow card) 5'; Smith (yellow card) 6'; Akpom 30'; Figueiredo 63' (o.g.); Christie 80' (o.g.); Jones (yellow card) 86'	Stadium: MKM Stadium; Attendance: 16,445; Referee: Dean Whitestone

5 November 2022 19	Millwall	0–0	Hull City	Bermondsey
15:00 GMT		Report	Pelkas (yellow card) 27'; Estupiñán (red card) 37'; Smith (yellow card) 90'; Coyle (yellow card) 90+5'	Stadium: The Den; Attendance: 14,488; Referee: John Busby

8 November 2022 20	Cardiff City	2–3	Hull City	Leckwith, Cardiff
19:45 GMT	Robinson 47'; Whyte 62'	Report	Pelkas 4'; Slater 75', 77'; Sinik (yellow card) 90+1'	Stadium: Cardiff City Stadium; Attendance: 16,387; Referee: James Bell

12 November 2022 21	Hull City	1–2	Reading	Kingston upon Hull
15:00 GMT	Greaves 9'	Report	Méïté 32'; Hendrick (yellow card) 40'; Longman 90+4' (o.g.)	Stadium: MKM Stadium; Attendance: 15,997; Referee: Gavin Ward

11 December 2022 22	Watford	0–0	Hull City	Watford
15:00 GMT		Report	Woods (yellow card) 19'; Greaves (yellow card) 37'; Christie (yellow card) 44'; Jones (yellow card) 50'	Stadium: Vicarage Road; Attendance: 18,846; Referee: Dean Whitestone

17 December 2022 23	Hull City	1–1	Sunderland	Kingston upon Hull
15:00 GMT	Greaves (yellow card) 36'; Estupiñán (penalty missed) 49'; Tufan 82'	Report	Embleton (red card) 59'; Stewart 74'; Gooch (yellow card) 90+3'	Stadium: MKM Stadium; Attendance: 18,120; Referee: Gavin Ward

26 December 2022 24	Hull City	1–1	Blackpool	Kingston upon Hull
15:00 GMT	Seri (yellow card) 47'; Estupiñán 77'; Greaves (yellow card) 86'	Report	Garbutt (yellow card) 21'; Carey 28'; Thorniley (red card) 53'; Grimshaw (yellow card) 90+3'	Stadium: MKM Stadium; Attendance: 19,170; Referee: John Brooks

30 December 2022 25	Birmingham City	0–1	Hull City	Bordesley, Birmingham
19:45 GMT	Bacuna (yellow card) 32'; Roberts (yellow card) 57'; Deeney (yellow card) 90+4'	Report	Sayyadmanesh (yellow card) 38'; Estupiñán 77'	Stadium: St Andrew's; Attendance: 17,868; Referee: Steve Martin

2 January 2023 26	Wigan Athletic	1–4	Hull City	Wigan
15:00 GMT	Tilt (yellow card) 42'; Broadhead 63'	Report	Seri (yellow card) 6'; Greaves 15', (yellow card) 90'; Estupiñán 78'; Smith 85', 90+1'	Stadium: DW Stadium; Attendance: 12,522; Referee: Geoff Eltringham

14 January 2023 27	Hull City	1–1	Huddersfield Town	Kingston upon Hull
15:00 GMT	Estupiñán 90+8'	Report	Helik 21'; Rudoni (yellow card) 54'; Holmes (yellow card) 57'	Stadium: MKM Stadium; Attendance: 17,928; Referee: Thomas Bramall

20 January 2023 28	Sheffield United	1–0	Hull City	Sheffield
19:45 GMT	Jebbison 4'; Ahmedhodžić (yellow card) 11'; Doyle (yellow card) 20'; Norwood (yellow card) 35'; Robinson (yellow card) 83'; McBurnie (yellow card) 85'; Bogle (yellow card) 90'	Report	Estupiñán (yellow card) 57'; Tetteh (red card) 84'; Connolly (yellow card) 90+1'	Stadium: Bramall Lane; Attendance: 29,271; Referee: Darren Bond

28 January 2023 29	Hull City	3–0	Queens Park Rangers	Kingston upon Hull
15:00 GMT	Connolly 10', 64'; Dickie 62' (o.g.)	Report	Lowe (yellow card) 20'; Iroegbunam (yellow card) 40'; Armstrong (yellow card) 67'; Dunne (yellow card) 90+1'	Stadium: MKM Stadium; Attendance: 16,418; Referee: James Linington

4 February 2023 30	Hull City	1–0	Cardiff City	Kingston upon Hull
15:00 GMT	Christie 62', (yellow card) 90+9'; Slater (yellow card) 76'	Report	Robinson (penalty missed) 23'	Stadium: MKM Stadium; Attendance: 16,584; Referee: David Webb

11 February 2023 31	Stoke City	0–0	Hull City	Stoke-on-Trent
15:00 GMT		Report	Elder (yellow card) 50'; Woods (yellow card) 82'	Stadium: Bet365 Stadium; Attendance: 23,970; Referee: Andy Woolmer

14 February 2023 32	Norwich City	3–1	Hull City	Norwich
19:45 GMT	Dowell 18'; Sara 58'; Sargent 89'	Report	Greaves 14'; Ebiowei (yellow card) 76'	Stadium: Carrow Road; Attendance: 25,767; Referee: Dean Whitestone

18 February 2023 33	Hull City	0–0	Preston North End	Kingston upon Hull
15:00 GMT	Tufan (yellow card) 33'; Pelkas (yellow card) 65'	Report	Diaby (yellow card) 76'; Fernández (yellow card) 90+2'	Stadium: MKM Stadium; Attendance: 17,776; Referee: Sam Allison

25 February 2023 34	Bristol City	1–0	Hull City	Ashton Gate, Bristol
15:00 GMT	Wells 70' (pen.)	Report	Coyle (yellow card) 82'	Stadium: Ashton Gate Stadium; Attendance: 20,333; Referee: Samuel Barrott

3 March 2023 35	Hull City	2–0	West Bromwich Albion	Kingston upon Hull
20:00 GMT	Tetteh 33'; O'Shea 57' (o.g.)	Report	Moulmby (yellow card) 52'; Gardner-Hickman (yellow card) 90+4'	Stadium: MKM Stadium; Attendance: 17,021; Referee: James Linington

11 March 2023 36	Coventry City	1–1	Hull City	Coventry
15:00 GMT	Godden 71'	Report	Estupiñán 52'	Stadium: Coventry Building Society Arena; Attendance: 22,206; Referee: Josh Smith

15 March 2023 37	Hull City	1–3	Burnley	Kingston upon Hull
19:45 GMT	Pelkas (yellow card) 39'; Tufan 90+3'	Report	Tella 43', 59', 73'; Ekdal (yellow card) 57'; Maatsen (yellow card) 82'	Stadium: MKM Stadium; Attendance: 17,271; Referee: Tim Robinson

18 March 2023 38	Reading	1–1	Hull City	Reading
15:00 GMT	Carroll 44', (yellow card) 67'; Yiadom (yellow card) 70'	Report	Slater 26'; Jones (yellow card) 90+3'	Stadium: Madejski Stadium; Attendance: 12,033; Referee: Gavin Ward

1 April 2023 39	Hull City	0–0	Rotherham United	Kingston upon Hull
15:00 BST		Report	Humphreys (yellow card) 35'; Peltier (yellow card) 60'; Quina (red card) 79'	Stadium: MKM Stadium; Attendance: 23,432; Referee: David Webb

7 April 2023 40	Sunderland	4–4	Hull City	Sunderland
17:30 BST	Gelhardt 21'; Diallo 22', 73' (pen.); Clarke 81'	Report	Tufan 11', 90+8' (pen.); Sayyadmanesh 25', (yellow card) 34'; Slater 66'; Elder (yellow card) 83'	Stadium: Stadium of Light; Attendance: 40,677; Referee: Keith Stroud

10 April 2023 41	Hull City	1–0	Millwall	Kingston upon Hull
15:00 BST	Traoré 70'; Darlow (yellow card) 84'	Report	Hutchinson (yellow card) 65'; Burke (yellow card) 87'	Stadium: MKM Stadium; Attendance: 20,069; Referee: Josh Smith

15 April 2023 42	Blackburn Rovers	0–0	Hull City	Blackburn
19:45 BST	Carter (yellow card) 54'	Report	Pelkas (yellow card) 86'; Darlow (yellow card) 90+3'	Stadium: Ewood Park; Attendance: 14,847; Referee: John Busby

19 April 2023 43	Middlesbrough	3–1	Hull City	Middlesbrough
20:00 BST	Hackney 55'; Archer 58'; Akpom 61', (yellow card) 62'	Report	Sayyadmanesh 41'; Vaughan (yellow card) 64'	Stadium: Riverside Stadium; Attendance: 24,923; Referee: Andy Davies

22 April 2023 44	Hull City	1–0	Watford	Kingston upon Hull
15:00 BST	Tufan 25' (pen.); Coyle (yellow card) 60'; Ebiowei (yellow card) 79'; Woods (yellow card) 90+4'	Report	Louza (yellow card) 72'; Pedro (yellow card) 79'	Stadium: MKM Stadium; Attendance: 20,666; Referee: Oliver Langford

29 April 2023 45	Hull City	1–1	Swansea City	Kingston upon Hull
15:00 BST	Cabango 3' (o.g.)	Report	Cundle 39'; Manning (yellow card) 43'; Paterson (yellow card) 50'	Stadium: MKM Stadium; Attendance: 23,036; Referee: Geoff Eltringham

8 May 2023 46	Luton Town	0–0	Hull City	Luton
15:00 BST	Lansbury (yellow card) 58'	Report		Stadium: Kenilworth Road; Attendance: 10,061; Referee: James Linington

=== FA Cup ===
All teams from the top two divisions entered the competition at the third round stage, the draw for which took place on 28 November 2022. Hull were drawn at home against Premier League club Fulham, managed by former City manager Marco Silva. The game was played on 7 January 2023. A tight first half was closed by a Layvin Kurzawa goal late on. The visitors dominated after the break, with Hull sending Matt Ingram forward for a corner in added time in an attempt to score an equaliser. Fulham cleared the corner to Hull-born Daniel James, who ran through Lewie Coyle to score into an empty net. As a result, Hull were knocked out of the competition, with the Cottagers progressing to the fourth round.

Win Draw Loss Fixtures

7 January 2023 Third round	Hull City	0–2	Fulham	Kingston upon Hull
15:00 GMT	Elder (yellow card) 47'	Report	Kurzawa 37'; Diop (yellow card) 42'; James 90+4'	Stadium: MKM Stadium; Attendance: 14,175; Referee: Josh Smith

=== EFL Cup ===
The draw for the first round of the cup took place on 23 June 2022, with matches taking place during the week starting 8 August 2022. Hull City were drawn away to Bradford City in the first round. The match was selected for live coverage by Sky Sports. The match took place on 9 August 2022, and Hull got off to a fortunate start when, halfway through the first half, Randell Williams passed in for Ozan Tufan to strike the bar. The ball rebounded on to Bradford's goalkeeper, Harry Lewis and ended-up in the net. Towards the end of the first half Andy Cook headed in a cross, and minutes later from a corner, Cook struck again. With no further goals, Hull failed to progress to the next round.

Win Draw Loss Fixtures

9 August 2022 First round	Bradford City	2–1	Hull City	Bradford
19:45 BST	Cook 39', 44'; Gilliead (yellow card) 74'	Report	Lewis 24' (o.g.); Greaves (yellow card) 27'	Stadium: Valley Parade; Attendance: 5,394; Referee: Seb Stockbridge
Note: Broadcast live on Sky Sports

== Statistics ==
As of 8 May 2023.

=== Appearances ===
Note: Appearances shown after a "+" indicate player came on during course of the match.

No.	Pos	Nat	Player	Total		Championship		FA Cup		League Cup	
No.	Pos	Nat	Player	Apps	Goals	Apps	Goals	Apps	Goals	Apps	Goals
1	GK	(England) ENG	Matt Ingram	23	0	22	0	1	0	0	0
2	DF	(England) ENG	Lewie Coyle	43	0	26+15	0	1	0	0+1	0
3	DF	(Australia) AUS	Callum Elder	31	0	21+8	0	1	0	1	0
4	DF	(England) ENG	Jacob Greaves	45	4	40+4	4	0	0	1	0
5	DF	(England) ENG	Alfie Jones	41	0	40	0	0	0	1	0
6	DF	(Portugal) POR	Tobias Figueiredo	24	0	18+4	0	1	0	0+1	0
7	MF	(Turkey) TUR	Ozan Tufan	43	8	26+15	8	1	0	1	0
8	MF	(Scotland) SCO	Greg Docherty	36	1	18+17	1	1	0	0	0
9	FW	(Iran) IRI	Allahyar Sayyadmanesh	20	2	16+3	2	0	0	1	0
10	MF	(England) ENG	Malcolm Ebiowei	12	0	5+7	0	0	0	0	0
11	FW	(Turkey) TUR	Doğukan Sinik	12	0	2+10	0	0	0	0	0
12	DF	(England) ENG	Josh Emmanuel	0	0	0	0	0	0	0	0
12	GK	(England) ENG	Karl Darlow	12	0	12	0	0	0	0	0
13	GK	(England) ENG	Nathan Baxter	12	0	12	0	0	0	0	0
14	MF	(England) ENG	Andy Cannon	6	0	1+4	0	0	0	1	0
14	MF	(Republic of Ireland) IRL	Harry Vaughan	5	0	5	0	0	0	00	0
15	MF	(England) ENG	Ryan Woods	27	0	14+12	0	1	0	0	0
16	MF	(England) ENG	Ryan Longman	37	2	19+18	2	0	0	0	0
17	DF	(Republic of Ireland) IRL	Sean McLoughlin	29	0	24+3	0	1	0	1	0
18	MF	(Mali) MLI	Adama Traoré	13	1	9+3	1	0	0	1	0
19	FW	(Colombia) COL	Óscar Estupiñán	37	13	29+6	13	0+1	0	0+1	0
20	FW	(England) ENG	Mallik Wilks	2	0	0+1	0	0	0	1	0
20	MF	(Greece) GRE	Dimitrios Pelkas	27	2	18+8	2	0	0	1	0
21	DF	(England) ENG	Brandon Fleming	4	0	1+3	0	0	0	0	0
22	FW	(England) ENG	Tyler Smith	15	3	5+9	3	1	0	0	0
23	MF	(England) ENG	Randell Williams	8	0	1+6	0	0	0	1	0
24	MF	(Ivory Coast) CIV	Jean Michaël Seri	37	1	33+4	1	0	0	0	0
25	FW	(Scotland) SCO	James Scott	0	0	0	0	0	0	0	0
27	MF	(England) ENG	Regan Slater	46	5	44	5	0+1	0	0+1	0
28	MF	(Wales) WAL	Callum Jones	2	0	0+1	0	0+1	0	0	0
29	DF	(England) ENG	Matty Jacob	0	0	0	0	0	0	0	0
30	FW	(Ghana) GHA	Benjamin Tetteh	17	1	10+5	1	0+1	0	0+1	0
32	GK	(France) FRA	Thimothée Lo-Tutala	0	0	0	0	0	0	0	0
33	DF	(Republic of Ireland) IRL	Cyrus Christie	28	3	24+4	3	0	0	0	0
34	MF	(England) ENG	Harvey Vale	3	0	1+1	0	1	0	0	0
35	MF	(England) ENG	Xavier Simons	13	0	5+7	0	1	0	0	0
36	FW	(England) ENG	Will Jarvis	2	0	0+2	0	0	0	0	0
37	GK	(Wales) WAL	David Robson	1	0	0	0	0	0	1	0
41	DF	(Republic of Ireland) IRL	Jevon Mills	0	0	0	0	0	0	0	0
44	FW	(Republic of Ireland) IRL	Aaron Connolly	6	2	4+1	2	0+1	0	0	0
46	MF	(England) ENG	Harry Wood	1	0	0+1	0	0	0	0	0
49	MF	(United States) USA	Vaughn Covil	7	0	1+5	0	0	0	1	0

- Source: Compiled from competitive match reports

=== Top goalscorers ===
Player	Number	Position	Championship	FA Cup	League Cup	Total
(Colombia) Óscar Estupiñán	19	FW	13	0	0	13
(Turkey) Ozan Tufan	7	MF	8	0	0	8
(England) Regan Slater	27	MF	5	0	0	5
(England) Jacob Greaves	4	DF	4	0	0	4
(Republic of Ireland) Cyrus Christie	33	DF	3	0	0	3
(England) Tyler Smith	22	FW	3	0	0	3
(Republic of Ireland) Aaron Connolly	44	FW	2	0	0	2
(England) Ryan Longman	16	MF	2	0	0	2
(Greece) Dimitrios Pelkas	20	MF	2	0	0	2
(Iran) Allahyar Sayyadmanesh	9	FW	2	0	0	2
(Scotland) Greg Docherty	8	MF	1	0	0	1
(Ivory Coast) Jean Michaël Seri	24	MF	1	0	0	1
(Ghana) Benjamin Tetteh	30	FW	1	0	0	1
(Mali) Adama Traoré	18	MF	1	0	0	1
Total			48	0	0	48

=== Disciplinary record ===
Player	Number	Position	Championship		FA Cup		League Cup		Total	
Player	Number	Position	Yellow card	Red card	Yellow card	Red card	Yellow card	Red card	Yellow card	Red card
(Colombia) Óscar Estupiñán	19	FW	2	1	0	0	0	0	2	1
(Ghana) Benjamin Tetteh	30	FW	1	1	0	0	0	0	1	1
(England) Jacob Greaves	4	DF	6	0	0	0	1	0	7	0
(England) Regan Slater	27	MF	7	0	0	0	0	0	7	0
(Australia) Callum Elder	3	DF	5	0	1	0	0	0	6	0
(Greece) Dimitrios Pelkas	20	MF	6	0	0	0	0	0	6	0
(England) Ryan Woods	15	MF	6	0	0	0	0	0	6	0
(England) Lewie Coyle	2	DF	5	0	0	0	0	0	5	0
(England) Alfie Jones	5	DF	4	0	0	0	0	0	4	0
(Iran) Allahyar Sayyadmanesh	9	FW	4	0	0	0	0	0	4	0
(Ivory Coast) Jean Michaël Seri	24	MF	4	0	0	0	0	0	4	0
(Republic of Ireland) Cyrus Christie	33	DF	3	0	0	0	0	0	3	0
(Portugal) Tobias Figueiredo	6	DF	3	0	0	0	0	0	3	0
(England) Karl Darlow	12	GK	2	0	0	0	0	0	2	0
(England) Ryan Longman	16	MF	2	0	0	0	0	0	2	0
(Turkey) Doğukan Sinik	11	FW	2	0	0	0	0	0	2	0
(England) Malcolm Ebiowei	10	MF	2	0	0	0	0	0	2	0
(England) Nathan Baxter	13	GK	1	0	0	0	0	0	1	0
(Republic of Ireland) Aaron Connolly	44	FW	1	0	0	0	0	0	1	0
(Scotland) Greg Docherty	8	MF	1	0	0	0	0	0	1	0
(England) Matt Ingram	1	GK	1	0	0	0	0	0	1	0
(England) Tyler Smith	22	FW	1	0	0	0	0	0	1	0
(Turkey) Ozan Tufan	7	MF	1	0	0	0	0	0	1	0
(Republic of Ireland) Harry Vaughan	14	MF	1	0	0	0	0	0	1	0
(England) Randell Williams	23	MF	1	0	0	0	0	0	1	0
Total			72	2	1	0	1	0	74	2

== Kits ==
On 20 December 2021, the club unveiled the third kit for the 2022–23 season would be the away kit used in the 2021–22 season – a blackout kit with a "tone-on-tone front stripe". The shorts would be black with a tonal side panel and black socks with tonal cuff detail. On 30 June 2022, the club announced that Giacom had agreed to step aside from their front of shirt sponsorship deal, but would remain sponsors for the club's training-ware range of goods. The following day, it was announced that a club-record Championship deal had been done with Corendon Airlines to become the shirt sponsor for the season. On 3 July 2022 Hull City revealed the home kit for the 2022–23 season, exactly a week before the pre-season campaign began. The shirt would be a traditional black and amber striped pattern with white pinstriped border. The shorts would be black with a contrast coloured middle panel and the socks would be black with amber calf hoop.

On 9 July 2022 the club announced that Tomya would become the back-of-shorts sponsor of all their match kits.

The away kit was revealed on 19 July 2022, a white shirt with grey pinstripes, coloured striped cuffs. Shorts would be red with coloured side panels, socks would be white with 4 thin coloured hoops.

On 16 September 2022 the club announced that Efes Beverage Group would become the back-of-shirts sponsor of all their match kits.

== Awards ==
The annual awards for the club saw Regan Slater pick-up the Players' Player of the Year and Supporters' Player of the Year awards. Alfie Jones picked up the Player of the Year which was chosen by head coach, Liam Rosenior. Greg Docherty was presented with the Goal of the Season award for his goal against Blackpool on 19 October 2022 in the 1–3 away win in the league. Jacob Greaves took the award for Young Player of the Year for the third year in a row. The Academy Player of the Year award was renamed the Frank Donoghue Academy Player of the Year award in honour of Frank Donoghue, and went to Stan Ashbee.
