= Regan Slater =

English footballer (born 1999)

- Slater in 2026

Personal information
- Full name: Regan Newman Slater
- Date of birth: 11 September 1999 (age 27)
- Place of birth: Gleadless, Sheffield, England
- Height: 5 ft 8 in (1.73 m)
- Position: Midfielder

Team information
- Current team: Hull City
- Number: 27

Youth career
- 2014–2016: Sheffield United

Senior career*
Years	Team	Apps	(Gls)
2016–2022	Sheffield United	1	(0)
2018–2019	→ Carlisle United (loan)	35	(2)
2019–2020	→ Scunthorpe United (loan)	12	(0)
2020–2021	→ Hull City (loan)	27	(1)
2022–	Hull City	191	(10)
- * Club domestic league appearances and goals as of 21:32, 22 August 2026 (UTC)

Regan Newman Slater (born 11 September 1999) is an English professional footballer who plays as a midfielder for Premier League club Hull City.

== Career ==
Born in Gleadless, Sheffield, Slater is a graduate of the Sheffield United academy. He further progressed to captain the youth side.

In November 2016, Slater made his first team debut against Grimsby Town; scoring a goal in the 4–2 victory and becoming the youngest footballer to achieve this feat for the club. On 28 December 2016, Slater was promoted to the senior team; penning a deal which would keep him at the club till 2020. On 16 December 2017, Slater made his league debut, replacing Samir Carruthers in a 1–0 defeat against Preston North End. In January 2018, he made an appearance against Ipswich Town in the FA Cup; where his tackle against Bersant Celina was later said by manager Chris Wilder to be his "personal highlight" of the match.

On 20 July 2018, Slater was loaned out to League Two club Carlisle United on a one-year deal. He scored his first two goals for the club in a 4–0 win over Swindon Town in November 2018.

On 27 July 2019, Slater signed a season-long loan with Scunthorpe United, the same day scoring on his debut in a pre-season friendly against Lincoln City.

On 30 September 2020, Slater signed a season-long loan with Hull City. He made his debut on 3 October 2020 in the home win to Plymouth Argyle. On 27 October 2020, he came off the bench in a triple-substitution, away to Bristol Rovers and scored the second goal for Hull in a 3–1 win.

On 27 January 2022, Slater returned to the Hull City after signing a two-and-a-half-year deal for an undisclosed fee, revealed to be £50,000. On 2 May 2023, Slater received both the Player's Player and Supporter's Player of the Year awards following his strong 2022–23 campaign.

On 21 June 2023, Slater signed a new three-year deal with Hull City.

On 3 September 2026, Slater signed a new three-year deal with Hull City, with the club having the option to trigger a 12-month extension.

== Career statistics ==
As of 25 August 2026.

Appearances and goals by club, season and competition
Club	Season	League			FA Cup		League Cup		Other		Total	
Club	Season	Division	Apps	Goals	Apps	Goals	Apps	Goals	Apps	Goals	Apps	Goals
Sheffield United	2016–17	League One	0	0	0	0	0	0	1 (Note: Appearance(s) in EFL Trophy)	1	1	1
Sheffield United	2017–18	Championship	1	0	1	0	0	0	—		2	0
Sheffield United	2018–19	Championship	0	0	0	0	0	0	—		0	0
Sheffield United	2019–20	Premier League	0	0	0	0	0	0	—		0	0
Sheffield United	2020–21	Premier League	0	0	0	0	0	0	—		0	0
Sheffield United	2021–22	Championship	0	0	0	0	0	0	—		0	0
Sheffield United	Total		1	0	1	0	0	0	1	1	3	1
Carlisle United (loan)	2018–19	League Two	35	2	2	0	1	0	3	0	41	2
Scunthorpe United (loan)	2019–20	League Two	12	0	0	0	1	0	2	0	15	0
Hull City (loan)	2020–21	League One	27	1	2	0	0	0	5	0	34	1
Hull City	2021–22	Championship	16	0	0	0	0	0	0	0	16	0
Hull City	2022–23	Championship	44	5	1	0	1	0	0	0	46	5
Hull City	2023–24	Championship	38	2	2	0	1	0	0	0	41	2
Hull City	2024–25	Championship	44	1	1	0	1	0	0	0	46	1
Hull City	2025–26	Championship	42	2	2	0	1	0	3 (Note: Appearances in EFL Championship play-offs)	0	48	2
Hull City	2026–27	Premier League	7	0	0	0	1	0	0	0	9	0
Hull City	Total		191	10	6	0	5	0	3	0	199	10
Career total			260	13	11	0	7	0	14	1	292	14

== Honours ==
Hull City

- EFL Championship play-offs: 2026
- EFL League One: 2020–21

Individual

- Hull City Player's Player of the Year: 2022–23
- Hull City Supporter's Player of the Year: 2022–23
