= Doğukan Sinik =

Turkish footballer

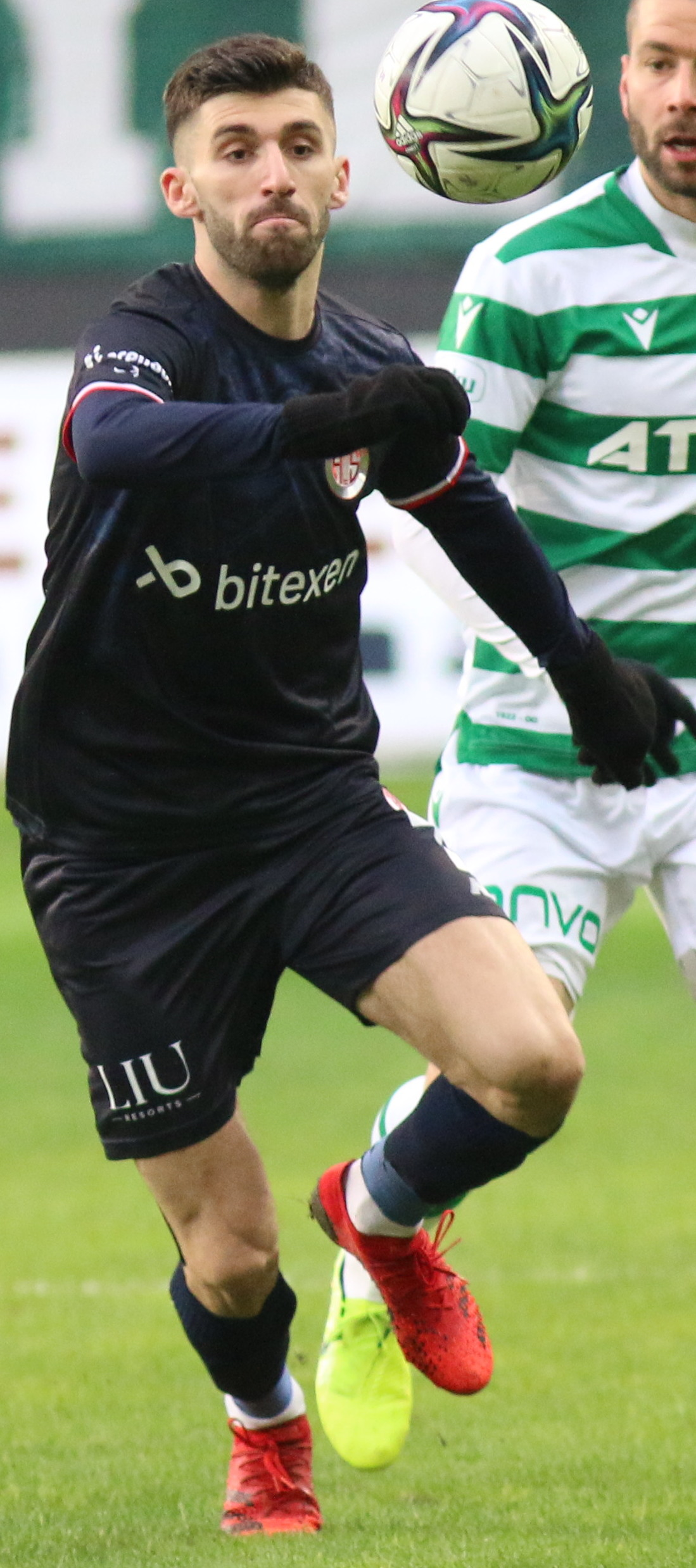
- Sinik with Antalyaspor in 2021

Personal information
- Full name: Doğukan Sinik
- Date of birth: 21 January 1999 (age 27)
- Place of birth: Antalya, Turkey
- Height: 1.80 m (5 ft 11 in)
- Position: Winger

Team information
- Current team: Antalyaspor
- Number: 70

Youth career
- –2017: Antalyaspor

Senior career*
Years	Team	Apps	(Gls)
2016–2022	Antalyaspor	110	(4)
2017–2018	→ Kemerspor 2003 (loan)	30	(2)
2022–2025	Hull City	13	(0)
2023	→ Antalyaspor (loan)	12	(3)
2024	→ Hatayspor (loan)	9	(1)
2025–	Antalyaspor	20	(0)

International career^{‡}
2015	Turkey U16	3	(0)
2016–2017	Turkey U18	5	(0)
2017–2018	Turkey U19	9	(1)
2018–2019	Turkey U21	8	(1)
2022–	Turkey	6	(2)
- * Club domestic league appearances and goals as of 19:31, 10 June 2026 (UTC) ‡ National team caps and goals as of 19 November 2022

Doğukan Sinik (born 21 January 1999) is a Turkish footballer who plays as a winger for TFF 1. Lig club Antalyaspor.

== Club career ==
Having spent many years in Turkey playing for his hometown club, Sinik joined Hull City for an undisclosed fee on 20 July 2022. He made his debut on 30 September 2022, when he came on as a 71st-minute substitute for Ryan Longman in the 2–0 home loss to Luton Town.

On 12 January 2023, Sinik, having struggled with a hamstring injury since arriving at Hull, joined Antalyaspor on loan until the end of the season.

At the start of the following season, Hull City Head Coach Liam Rosenior stated that Sinik was working hard on his fitness and had expressed a desire to be part of his first team plans.

On 1 February 2024, Sinik moved to Hatayspor on loan for the remainder of the season.

On 17 May 2025 it was announced that Sinik would be leaving Hull at the end of his contract.

== International career ==
On 29 March 2022, Sinik made his debut for the Turkey national football team in a friendly against Italy. On 7 June 2022, he scored his first goal for his nation as a part of a brace against Lithuania in the 2022–23 UEFA Nations League.

== Career statistics ==
=== Club ===
As of 24 October 2024

Appearances and goals by club, season and competition
Club	Season	League			National cup (Note: Includes Turkish Cup)		League cup		Other		Total	
Club	Season	Division	Apps	Goals	Apps	Goals	Apps	Goals	Apps	Goals	Apps	Goals
Antalyaspor	2014–15	TFF First League	1	0	0	0	—		—		1	0
Antalyaspor	2015–16	Süper Lig	1	0	0	0	—		—		1	0
Antalyaspor	2016–17	Süper Lig	1	0	0	0	—		—		1	0
Antalyaspor	2017–18	Süper Lig	0	0	0	0	—		—		0	0
Antalyaspor	2018–19	Süper Lig	33	0	2	0	—		—		35	0
Antalyaspor	2019–20	Süper Lig	21	0	4	1	—		—		25	1
Antalyaspor	2020–21	Süper Lig	21	1	3	0	—		—		24	1
Antalyaspor	2021–22	Süper Lig	32	3	3	0	—		1 (Note: Appearance in 2021 Turkish Super Cup)	0	36	3
Antalyaspor	Total		110	4	12	1	—		1	0	123	5
Kemerspor 2003 (loan)	2017–18	TFF Second League	30	2	1	0	—		—		31	2
Hull City	2022–23	EFL Championship	12	0	0	0	0	0	—		12	0
Hull City	2023–24	EFL Championship	1	0	0	0	0	0	—		1	0
Hull City	Total		13	0	0	0	0	0	0	0	13	0
Antalyaspor (loan)	2022–23	Süper Lig	12	3	0	0	—		—		12	3
Hatayspor (loan)	2023–24	Süper Lig	9	1	1	0	—		—		10	1
Career total			174	7	14	1	0	0	1	0	191	11

=== International goals ===
Scores and results list Turkey's goal tally first.

No.	Date	Venue	Opponent	Score	Result	Competition
1.	7 June 2022	LFF Stadium, Vilnius, Lithuania	Lithuania	1–0	6–0	2022–23 UEFA Nations League
2.	7 June 2022	LFF Stadium, Vilnius, Lithuania	Lithuania	2–0	6–0	2022–23 UEFA Nations League
