= Jacob Greaves =

English footballer (born 2000)

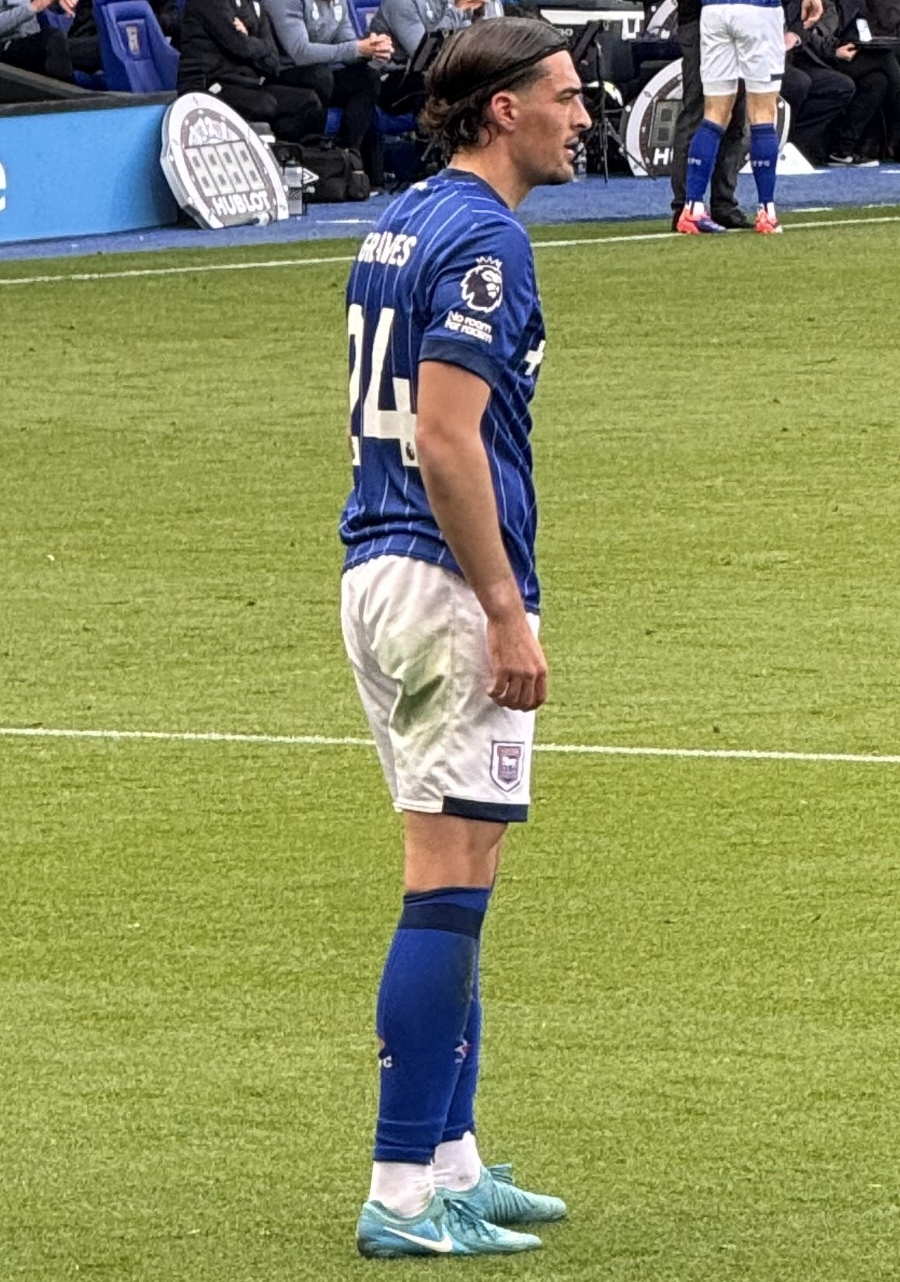
- Greaves playing for Ipswich Town in 2024

Personal information
- Full name: Jacob John Greaves
- Date of birth: 12 September 2000 (age 26)
- Place of birth: Cottingham, England
- Height: 6 ft 1 in (1.85 m)
- Position: Centre-back

Team information
- Current team: Ipswich Town
- Number: 24

Youth career
- 2008–2019: Hull City

Senior career*
Years	Team	Apps	(Gls)
2019–2024	Hull City	172	(6)
2019–2020	→ Cheltenham Town (loan)	29	(0)
2024–	Ipswich Town	49	(2)
- * Club domestic league appearances and goals as of 18:00, 2 May 2026 (UTC)

Jacob John Greaves (born 12 September 2000) is an English professional footballer who plays as a centre-back for Premier League club Ipswich Town.

== Early life ==
He is the son of former Hull City and York City defender Mark Greaves.

== Career ==
=== Cheltenham Town ===
On 8 August 2019, Greaves signed a three-year contract extension at Hull and joined Cheltenham Town on loan until January 2020. He made his league debut in a 0–0 draw against Morecambe playing the full 90 minutes.

Greaves' loan at Cheltenham was extended until the end of the season on 8 January 2020.

=== Hull City ===
Greaves made his senior debut for Hull City on 8 September 2020, in an EFL Trophy match against Leicester City U21s. On 17 October 2020, he made his league debut in a 3–0 win away to Rochdale. Greaves signed a new three-year contract with the club on 12 November 2020.

On 20 February 2021, Greaves initially scored his first career goal in a 3–3 away draw against Doncaster Rovers, only for the Dubious Goals Committee to award the final touch to Josh Magennis. His actual first career goal came on 22 October 2022, during his 101st league appearance for Hull, putting his side 1–0 up away at Rotherham United in their eventual 4–2 victory over the Millers. At the end of the same season, on 2 May 2023, Greaves achieved an impressive feat by winning his third consecutive Young Player of the Year award with Hull.

Whilst captaining his boyhood club on his 200th career appearance, Greaves bagged his first brace, completed by heading in a 94th minute winner in the Tigers' 2–1 away victory over Huddersfield Town on 17 February 2024. On 14 March, Greaves was named Hull City's Player of the Month for February. The following month, on 14 April, Greaves was also included in the EFL Championship Team of the Season for the 2023–24 campaign. Finally, a few weeks later, he was named Hull City's Player of the Year on 30 April.

=== Ipswich Town ===
On 12 July 2024, Greaves signed for newly promoted Premier League side Ipswich Town. Just over a month later, he made his debut on the opening day of the 2024–25 season, a 2-0 home defeat to Liverpool. In the reverse fixture, on 25 January 2025, Greaves scored a stoppage time consolation in the 4–1 loss at Anfield, coincidentally his first goal for the Tractor Boys.

== Career statistics ==
As of match played 2 May 2026

Appearances and goals by club, season and competition
Club	Season	League			FA Cup		EFL Cup		Other		Total	
Club	Season	Division	Apps	Goals	Apps	Goals	Apps	Goals	Apps	Goals	Apps	Goals
Hull City	2020–21	League One	39	0	1	0	0	0	1 (Note: Appearances in the EFL Trophy)	0	41	0
Hull City	2021–22	Championship	46	0	1	0	1	0	—		48	0
Hull City	2022–23	Championship	44	4	0	0	1	0	—		45	4
Hull City	2023–24	Championship	43	2	0	0	0	0	—		43	2
Hull City	Total		172	6	2	0	2	0	1	0	177	6
Cheltenham Town (loan)	2019–20	League Two	29	0	2	0	1	0	3	0	35	0
Ipswich Town	2024–25	Premier League	25	1	1	0	0	0	—		26	1
Ipswich Town	2025–26	Championship	24	1	2	1	1	0	—		27	2
Ipswich Town	Total		49	2	3	1	1	0	—		53	3
Career total			250	8	7	1	4	0	4	0	265	9

== Honours ==
Hull City

- EFL League One: 2020–21

Ipswich Town

- EFL Championship runner-up: 2025–26

Individual

- Hull City Player of the Year: 2023–24
- Hull City Young Player of the Year: 2020–21, 2021–22, 2022–23
- EFL Championship Team of the Season: 2023–24
- The Athletic Championship Team of the Season: 2023–24
