= Alfie Jones =

Canadian soccer player (born 1997)

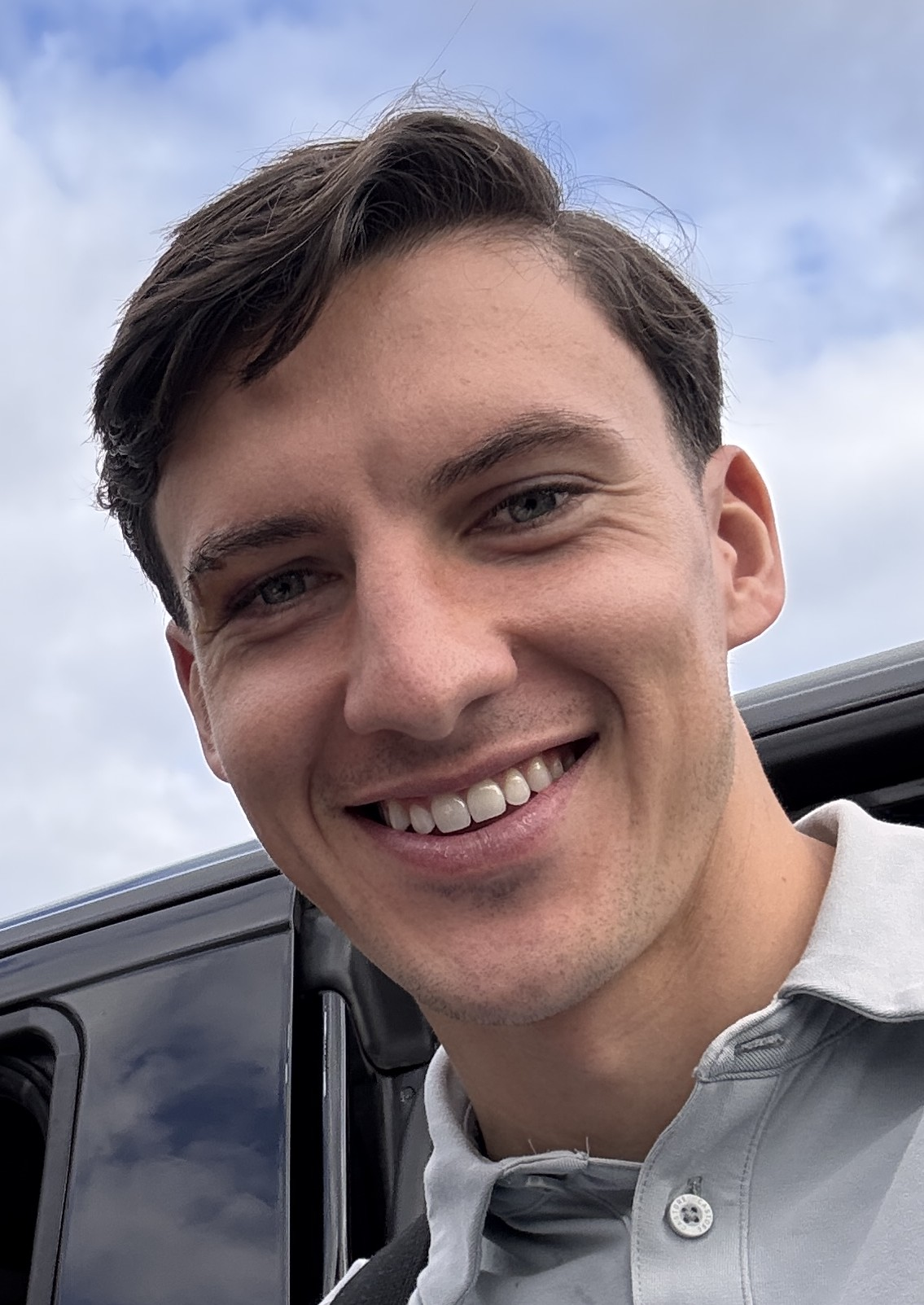
- Jones in 2025

Personal information
- Full name: Alfie Charles Jones
- Date of birth: 7 October 1997 (age 29)
- Place of birth: Bristol, England
- Height: 1.91 m (6 ft 3 in)
- Positions: Defender; midfielder

Team information
- Current team: Middlesbrough
- Number: 5

Youth career
- –2018: Southampton

Senior career*
| Years | Team | Apps | (Gls) |
| 2018–2020 | Southampton | 0 | (0) |
| 2018–2019 | → St Mirren (loan) | 14 | (1) |
| 2019–2020 | → Gillingham (loan) | 30 | (2) |
| 2020–2025 | Hull City | 180 | (2) |
| 2025– | Middlesbrough | 27 | (2) |

International career^{‡}
| 2025– | Canada | 2 | (0) |
- * Club domestic league appearances and goals as of 05:59, 8 October 2026 (UTC) ‡ National team caps and goals as of 07:50, 2 June 2026 (UTC)

Alfie Charles Jones (born 7 October 1997) is a professional footballer who plays as a defender or midfielder for EFL Championship club Middlesbrough. Born in England, he plays for the Canada national team.

== Club career ==
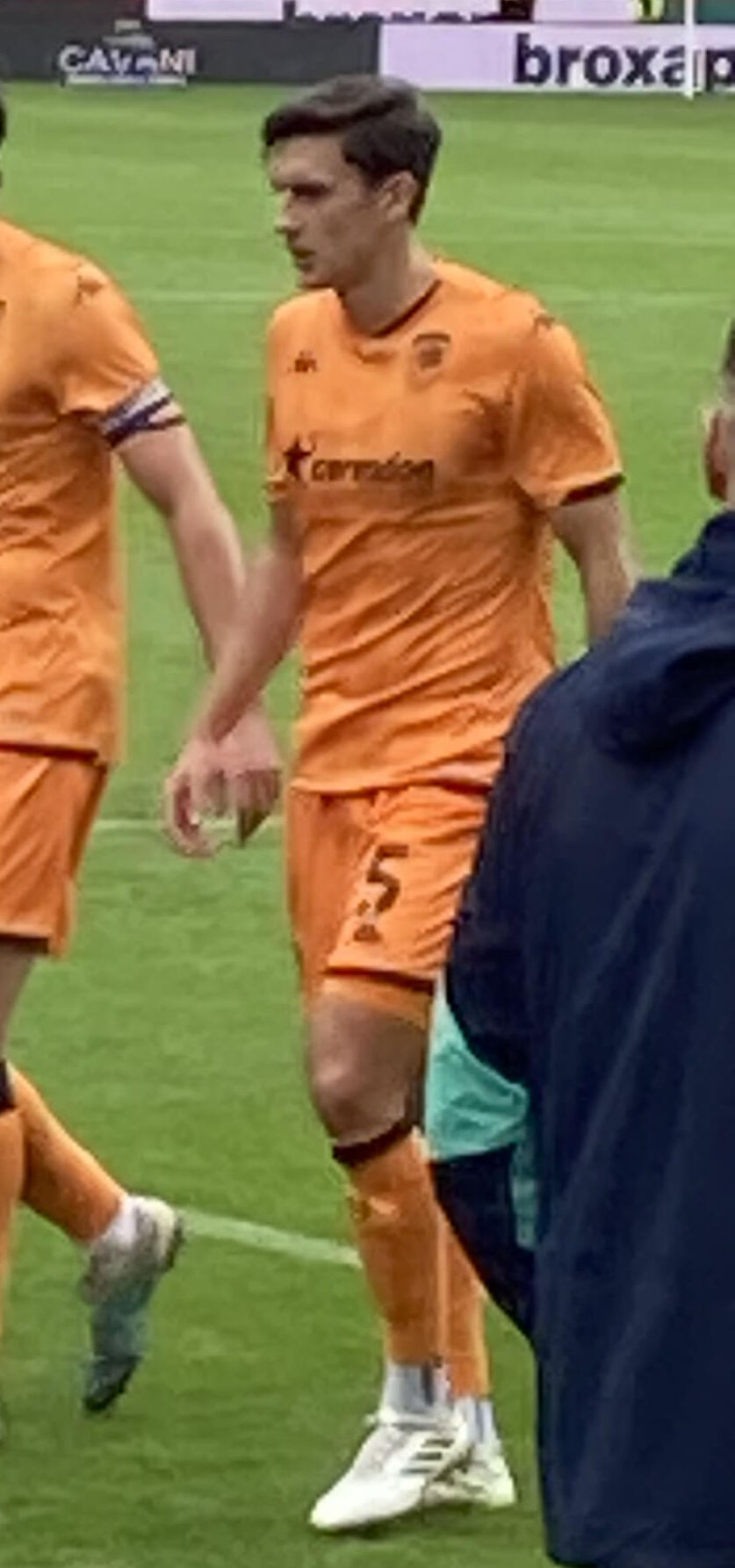
Jones with Hull City in 2023

Jones grew up in Long Ashton, a small village on the outskirts of Bristol. He attended Birdwell School and Backwell School. He played at the Southampton Academy in Bath.

Jones played on loan for Scottish Premiership club St Mirren during the 2018–19 season, but the agreement was terminated by St Mirren in January 2019.

On 2 July 2019, Jones signed a season-long loan with Gillingham. During his spell with the club, he made 36 appearances in all competitions.

On 4 September 2020, Jones joined League One side Hull City for an undisclosed fee, signing a one-year deal. He made his debut for the club on 8 September 2020, in the 1–2 loss to Leicester City U21 in the first round match of the EFL Trophy. On 18 May 2021, the club announced that they had exercised the option of a one-year contract extension for Jones. On 9 June 2021, Hull City announced that Jones had signed a new two-year contract, with the club having the option of a further year.

On 23 April 2022, Jones scored his first goal for the Tigers, netting the second of three goals in Hull's 3–0 home win over Reading. The following season, on 2 May 2023, Jones was decorated with Hull's Player of the Year award, as decided by head coach, Liam Rosenior. On 17 May 2023, Jones signed a new three-year deal with the club.

In July 2025, Jones joined Middlesbrough. On 16 August 2025, he scored his first goal for the club in a 3–0 away victory over Millwall.

== International career ==
Jones is eligible to represent Canada through his grandmother, who was born in Hillcrest, Alberta. His eligibility became known after discussions with teammate Liam Millar during their time together at Hull City.

He was approached to play for the Canada national team in October 2025. In November 2025, he was named in the squad ahead of a pair of friendlies. Administrative delays on his citizenship meant he was not eligible for the first match against Ecuador, but these were resolved by the time of the second match against Venezuela, in which he started. Jones played the full 90 minutes in Canada's 2–0 victory.

In May 2026, Jones was called-up to Canada's squad for the 2026 FIFA World Cup.

== Style of play ==
Having been used mostly as a defender prior to his arrival at Gillingham, Jones spent most of his time with the League One club playing as a midfielder. However, since moving to Hull City, he has returned to being a defender. In 2023, then Hull coach Liam Rosenior highlighted Jones' interceptions, blocks, and ball-playing abilities as being amongst his best attributes.

== Career statistics ==
=== Club ===
As of match played 12 September 2026

Appearances and goals by club, season and competition
| Club | Season | League | | | National cup (Note: Includes FA Cup) | | League cup (Note: Includes Scottish League Cup, EFL Cup) | | Other | | Total | |
| Club | Season | Division | Apps | Goals | Apps | Goals | Apps | Goals | Apps | Goals | Apps | Goals |
|---|---|---|---|---|---|---|---|---|---|---|---|---|
| Southampton U21 | 2016–17 | — | | | — | | — | | 4 (Note: Appearances in EFL Trophy) | 0 | 4 | 0 |
| Southampton U21 | 2017–18 | — | | | — | | — | | 3 | 1 | 3 | 1 |
| Southampton U21 | Total | | — | | — | | — | | 7 | 1 | 7 | 1 |
| St Mirren (loan) | 2018–19 | Scottish Premiership | 14 | 1 | 0 | 0 | 1 | 0 | — | | 15 | 1 |
| Gillingham (loan) | 2019–20 | League One | 30 | 2 | 4 | 0 | 1 | 0 | 0 | 0 | 35 | 2 |
| Hull City | 2020–21 | League One | 31 | 0 | 2 | 0 | 2 | 0 | 4 | 0 | 39 | 0 |
| Hull City | 2021–22 | Championship | 23 | 1 | 0 | 0 | 0 | 0 | — | | 23 | 1 |
| Hull City | 2022–23 | Championship | 40 | 0 | 0 | 0 | 1 | 0 | — | | 41 | 0 |
| Hull City | 2023–24 | Championship | 45 | 1 | 0 | 0 | 0 | 0 | — | | 45 | 1 |
| Hull City | 2024–25 | Championship | 41 | 0 | 1 | 0 | 1 | 0 | — | | 43 | 0 |
| Hull City | Total | | 180 | 2 | 3 | 0 | 4 | 0 | 4 | 0 | 191 | 2 |
| Middlesbrough | 2025–26 | Championship | 22 | 1 | 0 | 0 | 1 | 0 | 0 | 0 | 23 | 1 |
| Middlesbrough | 2026–27 | Championship | 5 | 1 | 0 | 0 | 2 | 0 | 0 | 0 | 7 | 1 |
| Middlesbrough | Total | | 27 | 2 | 0 | 0 | 3 | 0 | 0 | 0 | 30 | 2 |
| Career total | | | 250 | 7 | 7 | 0 | 9 | 0 | 11 | 1 | 277 | 8 |

=== International ===
As of match played 1 June 2026

Appearances and goals by national team and year
| National team | Year | Apps | Goals |
|---|---|---|---|
| Canada | 2025 | 1 | 0 |
| Canada | 2026 | 1 | 0 |
| Total | | 2 | 0 |

== Honours ==
Hull City

- EFL League One: 2020–21

Individual

- Hull City Player of the Year: 2022–23
