= 2020–21 Hull City A.F.C. season =

English football club season

Hull City
2020–21 season
- Owner: Assem Allam
- Manager: Grant McCann
- Stadium: KCOM Stadium
- League One: 1st (promoted)
- FA Cup: Second round
- EFL Cup: Third round
- EFL Trophy: Quarter-final
- Top goalscorer: League: Mallik Wilks (19); All: Mallik Wilks (22)
- Highest home attendance: 0 (Note: All home games held behind closed doors due to COVID-19 restrictions.)
- Lowest home attendance: 0
- Average home league attendance: 0
Home colours	Away colours	Third colours
- All statistics correct as of 9 May 2021.

The 2020–21 season is Hull City's first season back in League One, the third tier of English football, and their 117th year in existence. Alongside League One, the club participated in the FA Cup, EFL Cup and EFL Trophy.

== Background ==
Hull were relegated to League One having finished bottom of the Championship in the 2019–20 season. The delayed end to the 2019–20 season, due to the COVID-19 pandemic, had a knock-on to the 2020–21 season start which was scheduled for the weekend of 12 September 2020.

== Events ==
- On 5 July 2020, Jon Beale announced his departure from the post of academy manager after six years in the role, Richard Naylor took over the role.
- On 23 July 2020, the club announced the release of Will Mannion, Robbie McKenzie, Kevin Stewart and Jon Toral.
- On 23 July 2020, Angus MacDonald was offered a new contract, but on 15 August 2020 he signed a two-year contract with Rotherham United.
- On 7 August 2020, Lewie Coyle joined on a three-year deal from Fleetwood Town for an undisclosed fee.
- On 7 August 2020, Josh Emmanuel joined on a two-year deal from Bolton Wanderers on a free transfer.
- On 11 August 2020, Richie Smallwood joined the club on a two-year deal from Blackburn Rovers on a free transfer.
- On 20 August 2020, Elliot Bonds joined Cheltenham Town on a season-long loan, but this was cut short when he ruptured his anterior cruciate ligament in the game against Scunthorpe United on 20 October 2020.
- On 20 August 2020, Greg Docherty of Rangers signed a three-year deal with the club for an undisclosed fee.
- On 27 August 2020, Richie Smallwood was appointed as captain for the season.
- On 2 September 2020, Ryan Tafazolli signed a three-year deal with Wycombe Wanderers for an undisclosed fee.
- On 4 September 2020, Alfie Jones of Southampton signed a one-year deal with the club for an undisclosed fee.
- On 10 September 2020, Leo Lopes left the club to join Belgium club Cercle Brugge for an undisclosed fee.
- On 14 September 2020, Thomas Mayer joined on a two-year contract from Austria Lustenau on a free transfer.
- On 16 September 2020, following a successful application to the EFL, the match against Crewe Alexandra was selected as a test event for the return of supporters following the COVID-19 restrictions. But Hull City Council would not grant permission for the pilot as there had been a significant increase of coronavirus infection rate in the area during the previous week.
- On 24 September 2020, Hakeeb Adelakun of Bristol City signed on loan for the rest of the season, but was recalled by Bristol on 4 January 2021.
- On 30 September 2020, Regan Slater joined on a season-long loan from Sheffield United.
- On 16 October 2020, Keane Lewis-Potter was named the EFL Young Player of the Month award for September.
- On 12 November 2020, Jacob Greaves signed a new three-year contract with the club.
- On 27 November 2020, Billy Chadwick signed a new one-and-a-half-year deal with the club.
- On 30 November 2020, Brandon Fleming signed a new two-and-a-half-year deal with the club.
- On 19 December 2020, Billy Chadwick joined FC Halifax Town on a month-long loan, but was recalled on 14 January 2021.
- On 6 January 2021, Callum Jones signed a new two-and-a-half-year contract.
- On 13 January 2021, Jordan Flores joined on a free transfer from Dundalk, signing an 18-month contract.
- On 14 January 2021, Jordy de Wijs moved on loan to Queens Park Rangers for the remainder of the season.
- On 14 January 2021, Gavin Whyte joined on loan from Cardiff City for the rest of the season.
- On 18 January 2021, Daniel Crowley joined on loan for the remainder of the season from Birmingham City.
- On 18 January 2021, Keane Lewis-Potter signed a new contract until summer 2023.
- On 18 January 2021, Max Sheaf went on loan to Torquay United until the end of season.
- On 1 February 2021, Martin Samuelsen moved on loan to Aalborg BK for the rest of the season.
- On 1 February 2021, Max Clark returned to Hull City on a short-term deal to the end of the season from Vitesse.
- On 1 February 2021, Jordan Hickey left the club after his contract was cancelled by mutual consent.
- On 1 February 2021, David Milinković's move to Vancouver Whitecaps was make permanent after a clause in his loan contract was triggered.
- On 1 February 2021, Daniel Batty moved to Fleetwood Town after his contract was terminated by mutual consent.
- On 2 February 2021, Danny Lupano moved on loan to Derry City until the end of season.
- On 2 February 2021, Harvey Cartwright signed a new three-year deal with the club.
- On 12 February 2021, Grant McCann was named EFL League One Manager of the Month for January.
- On 5 March 2021, Sean McLoughlin, signed a new three-year contract with the club.
- On 5 March 2021, Billy Chadwick returned to FC Halifax Town for a month-long loan spell, which was extended to the end of the season on 29 March 2021.
- On 23 March 2021, Ahmed Salam signed a new one-year contract with the club.
- On 24 April 2021, City secured an immediate return to the EFL Championship, with two games to play, after a 2–1 win against a Lincoln City.
- On 29 April 2021, at the EFL Awards ceremony, Grant McCann secured the EFL League One Manager of the Season award, while Callum Elder and George Honeyman were included in the EFL League One Team of the Season.
- On 1 May 2021, Hull's 3–1 home win against Wigan Athletic secured the league title, their first in 55 years.
- On 7 May 2021, Grant McCann was named EFL League One Manager of the Month and Josh Magennis was named EFL League One Player of the Month for April.
- On 10 May 2021, Harry Wood signed a two-year contract with the club.
- On 13 May 2021, Jordy de Wijs signed permanently for Queens Park Rangers on a three-year deal.
- On 18 May 2021, the club announced that they had exercised the option of a one-year contract extension for Josh Magennis and Alfie Jones. While all other first-team players were to be retained, apart from Max Clark who would leave at the end of the season. New contracts were under discussion with George Long, Reece Burke and Elliot Bonds, while Matty Jacob has signed a one-year contract extension with the club.
- On 24 May 2021, Grant McCann was named League One Manager of the Year by the League Managers Association.
- On 25 May 2021, it was announced that George Long had opted not to sign a new contract with the club and instead signed for Millwall on a free transfer.
- On 2 June 2021, it was announced that Reece Burke would join Luton Town next season on a free transfer.
- On 7 June 2021, George Moncur signed, from Luton Town, on a two-year deal with the option of a further year.
- On 9 June 2021, Alfie Jones signed a new two-year deal with the club.
- On 16 June 2021, Andy Cannon signed a two-year deal with Hull City, the club holding an option for a further year.
- On 16 June 2021, it was announced that Callum Jones would join Morecambe on a season-long loan.
- On 17 June 2021, Randell Williams signed a two-year deal with Hull City, the club holding an option for a further year.
- On 22 June 2021, Jordan Flores signed a season-long loan deal with Northampton Town.
- On 25 June 2021, Nathan Baxter of Chelsea, signed a year-long loan deal with the club.

== Players ==
=== Current squad ===
As of 13 May 2021.

Note: Flags indicate national team as defined under FIFA eligibility rules; some limited exceptions apply. Players may hold more than one non-FIFA nationality.

No.	Pos.	Nation	Player
1	GK	ENG	George Long
2	DF	ENG	Lewie Coyle
3	DF	AUS	Callum Elder
5	DF	ENG	Reece Burke
6	MF	ENG	Richie Smallwood (captain)
7	FW	ENG	Mallik Wilks
9	FW	ENG	Tom Eaves
10	MF	ENG	George Honeyman
11	FW	SCO	James Scott
12	DF	ENG	Josh Emmanuel
13	GK	ENG	Matt Ingram
15	DF	ENG	Alfie Jones
16	MF	ENG	Jordan Flores
17	DF	IRL	Sean McLoughlin
18	MF	ENG	Regan Slater (On loan from Sheffield United)
19	FW	ENG	Keane Lewis-Potter
20	MF	ENG	Daniel Crowley (On loan from Birmingham City)

No.	Pos.	Nation	Player
21	DF	ENG	Brandon Fleming
22	MF	AUT	Thomas Mayer
23	MF	WAL	Gavin Whyte (On loan from Cardiff City)
24	DF	ENG	Jacob Greaves
25	DF	GHA	Festus Arthur
26	DF	ENG	Max Clark
27	FW	NIR	Josh Magennis
32	GK	ENG	Harvey Cartwright
33	MF	SCO	Greg Docherty
34	MF	ENG	Callum Jones
35	FW	ENG	James Berry
37	DF	ENG	Andy Smith
38	MF	ENG	Harry Wood
40	MF	ENG	Ahmed Salam
–	MF	GUY	Elliot Bonds

=== Out on loan ===
Note: Flags indicate national team as defined under FIFA eligibility rules; some limited exceptions apply. Players may hold more than one non-FIFA nationality.

No.	Pos.	Nation	Player
14	MF	NOR	Martin Samuelsen (at Aalborg BK)
28	MF	ENG	Max Sheaf (at Torquay United)
31	MF	ENG	Billy Chadwick (at FC Halifax Town)

== Transfers ==
=== Transfers in ===
Date	Position	Nationality	Name	From	Fee	Ref.
2 July 2020	CB	(Germany)	Festus Arthur	(England) Stockport County	Undisclosed	
2 July 2020	LW	(England)	Mallik Wilks	(England) Barnsley	Undisclosed	
7 August 2020	RB	(England)	Lewie Coyle	(England) Fleetwood Town	Undisclosed	
7 August 2020	RB	(England)	Josh Emmanuel	(England) Bolton Wanderers	Free transfer	
11 August 2020	CM	(England)	Richie Smallwood	(England) Blackburn Rovers	Free transfer	
20 August 2020	CM	(Scotland)	Greg Docherty	(Scotland) Rangers	Undisclosed	
4 September 2020	CB	(England)	Alfie Jones	(England) Southampton	Undisclosed	
14 September 2020	RM	(Austria)	Thomas Mayer	Austria Lustenau	Free transfer	
13 January 2021	CM	(England)	Jordan Flores	(Republic of Ireland) Dundalk	Free transfer	
1 February 2021	DF	(England)	Max Clark	(Netherlands) Vitesse	Undisclosed	

=== Loans in ===
Date from	Position	Nationality	Name	From	Date until	Ref.
24 September 2020	RW	(England)	Hakeeb Adelakun	(England) Bristol City	4 January 2021	
30 September 2020	DM	(England)	Regan Slater	(England) Sheffield United	End of season	
14 January 2021	RW	(Northern Ireland)	Gavin Whyte	(Wales) Cardiff City	End of season	
18 January 2021	AM	(England)	Daniel Crowley	(England) Birmingham City	End of season	

=== Transfers out ===
Date	Position	Nationality	Name	To	Fee	Ref.
1 July 2020	CF	(Mali)	Nouha Dicko	Unattached	Released	
1 July 2020	CM	(Norway)	Markus Henriksen	Unattached	Released	
1 July 2020	CM	(Australia)	Jackson Irvine	(Scotland) Hibernian	Released	
1 July 2020	LB	(Scotland)	Stephen Kingsley	(Scotland) Heart of Midlothian	Released	
1 July 2020	RB	(United States)	Eric Lichaj	(Turkey) Fatih Karagümrük	Released	
23 July 2020	GK	(England)	Will Mannion	(Cyprus) Pafos	Released	
23 July 2020	CB	(England)	Robbie McKenzie	(England) Gillingham	Released	
23 July 2020	DM	(England)	Kevin Stewart	(England) Blackpool	Released	
23 July 2020	AM	(Spain)	Jon Toral	(England) Birmingham City	Released	
15 August 2020	CB	(England)	Angus MacDonald	(England) Rotherham United	Free transfer	
2 September 2020	CB	(England)	Ryan Tafazolli	(England) Wycombe Wanderers	Undisclosed	
10 September 2020	CM	(Portugal)	Leo Lopes	(Belgium) Cercle Brugge	Undisclosed	
1 February 2021	MF	(England)	Jordan Hickey	Unattached	Mutual consent	
1 February 2021	MF	(France)	David Milinković	(Canada) Vancouver Whitecaps	Undisclosed	
1 February 2021	MF	(England)	Daniel Batty	(England) Fleetwood Town	Mutual consent	
13 May 2021	CB	(Netherlands)	Jordy de Wijs	(England) Queens Park Rangers	Undisclosed	

=== Loans out ===
Date from	Position	Nationality	Name	To	Date until	Ref.
20 August 2020	MF	(Guyana)	Elliot Bonds	(England) Cheltenham Town	6 November 2020	
20 November 2020	MF	(England)	Ryan Hanson	(England) Dover Athletic	End of season	
19 December 2020	MF	(England)	Billy Chadwick	(England) FC Halifax Town	14 January 2021	
14 January 2021	CB	(Netherlands)	Jordy de Wijs	(England) Queens Park Rangers	End of season	
18 January 2021	AM	(England)	Max Sheaf	(England) Torquay United	End of season	
1 February 2021	MF	(Norway)	Martin Samuelsen	(Denmark) Aalborg BK	End of season	
2 February 2021	CB	(Belgium)	Danny Lupano	(Republic of Ireland) Derry City	End of season	
5 March 2021	MF	(England)	Billy Chadwick	(England) FC Halifax Town	End of season	

== Pre-season ==
Pre-season training started on 10 August 2020 at the club's Cottingham training ground. A week long training camp followed at Oriam in Edinburgh, Scotland.

== Competitions ==
=== Overall ===
Competition	Started round	Current position / round	Final position / round	First match	Last match
League One	—	—	1st	12 September 2020	9 May 2021
EFL Cup	First round	—	Third round	5 September 2020	22 September 2020
FA Cup	First round	—	Second round	7 November 2020	29 November 2020
EFL Trophy	Group stage	—	Quarter-final	8 September 2020	2 February 2021

Updated to match played 9 May 2021.
Source: Competitions

=== League One ===
The first matches of the 2020–21 season are scheduled to take place on 12 September 2020 with the season concluding on the weekend of 8 to 9 May 2021. The fixtures for the season were released at 9:00 a.m. on 21 August 2020, with Hull starting the season with an away match at the Priestfield Stadium to play Gillingham and ends with another away trip to play Charlton Athletic at The Valley.

Hull opened the season with 3 wins which equalled the record that has stood since 28 August 1948 when they beat Mansfield Town 3–0 in Division Three North.

Because of the ongoing COVID-19 pandemic the EFL changed the rules on substitutes from 20 November 2020, for the remainder of the season, to allow 7 substitutes to be named per match, with up to 5 being allowed to be used.

==== League table ====
Pos	Team	Pld	W	D	L	GF	GA	GD	Pts	Promotion, qualification or relegation
1	Hull City (C, P)	46	27	8	11	80	38	+42	89	Promotion to the EFL Championship
2	Peterborough United (P)	46	26	9	11	83	46	+37	87	Promotion to the EFL Championship
3	Blackpool (O, P)	46	23	11	12	60	37	+23	80	Qualification for League One play-offs
4	Sunderland	46	20	17	9	70	42	+28	77	Qualification for League One play-offs
5	Lincoln City	46	22	11	13	69	50	+19	77	Qualification for League One play-offs
6	Oxford United	46	22	8	16	77	56	+21	74	Qualification for League One play-offs
7	Charlton Athletic	46	20	14	12	70	56	+14	74	
8	Portsmouth	46	21	9	16	65	51	+14	72	

Source: EFL Official Website
Rules for classification: 1) Points; 2) Goal difference; 3) Number of goals scored; 4) Head-to-head results; 5) Wins; 6) Away goals; 7) Penalty points (sec 9.5); 8) 12-point sending off offences
(C) Champions; (O) Play-off winners; (P) Promoted

==== Results summary ====
Overall								Home						Away					
Pld	W	D	L	GF	GA	GD	Pts	W	D	L	GF	GA	GD	W	D	L	GF	GA	GD
46	27	8	11	80	38	+42	89	14	4	5	32	14	+18	13	4	6	48	24	+24

Last updated: 9 May 2021.
Source: Sky Sports

==== Results by matchday ====
Matchday	1	2	3	4	5	6	7	8	9	10	11	12	13	14	15	16	17	18	19	20	21	22	23	24	25	26	27	28	29	30	31	32	33	34	35	36	37	38	39	40	41	42	43	44	45	46
Ground	A	H	A	H	A	A	H	H	A	A	H	A	A	H	A	H	A	H	H	A	H	H	A	A	H	A	H	H	A	A	H	A	H	H	A	H	A	H	A	H	A	H	H	A	H	A
Result	W	W	W	W	L	W	W	L	W	L	W	W	W	W	D	L	L	L	W	D	D	W	W	L	W	L	D	L	W	D	L	W	W	W	W	W	D	D	W	W	W	W	D	W	W	L
Position	4	3	2	2	2	2	1	3	2	4	2	1	1	1	1	1	1	2	2	2	2	1	1	2	1	2	2	2	2	3	3	3	2	1	1	1	1	1	1	1	1	1	1	1	1	1

Updated to match(es) played on 9 May 2021. Source: 11v11 for league tables and fixtures
A = Away; H = Home; W = Win; D = Draw; L = Loss

==== Matches ====
Win Draw Loss Postponed

12 September 2020 1	Gillingham	0–2	Hull City	Gillingham, Kent
15:00 BST	Robertson (yellow card) 73'; O'Keefe (yellow card) 73'; Ogilvie (yellow card) 82'	Report	Lewis-Potter 3'; Honeyman (yellow card) 73'; Magennis 82'	Stadium: Priestfield Stadium; Attendance: 0 Referee: Andy Woolmer
Note: Held behind closed doors.

19 September 2020 2	Hull City	1–0	Crewe Alexandra	Kingston upon Hull
15:00 BST	de Wijs (yellow card) 55'; Smallwood (yellow card) 67'; Elder (yellow card) 72'; Wilks 81', (yellow card) 90'; Mayer (yellow card) 83'	Report	Pickering (yellow card) 70'	Stadium: KCOM Stadium; Attendance: 0 Referee: Ben Toner
Note: Held behind closed doors.

26 September 2020 3	Northampton Town	0–2	Hull City	Sixfields, Northampton
15:00 BST	Missilou (yellow card) 33'; Watson (yellow card) 69'	Report	Magennis (yellow card) 30'; Lewis-Potter 34'; Honeyman 44'; Docherty (yellow card) 52'	Stadium: Sixfields Stadium; Attendance: 0 Referee: Alan Young
Note: Held behind closed doors.

3 October 2020 4	Hull City	1–0	Plymouth Argyle	Kingston upon Hull
15:00 BST	Adelakun 10'	Report	Opoku (yellow card) 57'	Stadium: KCOM Stadium; Attendance: 0 Referee: Robert Lewis
Note: Held behind closed doors.

9 October 2020 5	Fleetwood Town	4–1	Hull City	Fleetwood
19:45 BST	Saunders 17', 67'; Camps 47', (yellow card) 90+3'; Stubbs 73'	Report	Honeyman 21'	Stadium: Highbury Stadium; Attendance: 0 Referee: Ollie Yates
Note: Held behind closed doors.

17 October 2020 6	Rochdale	0–3	Hull City	Rochdale
15:00 BST	Beesley (yellow card) 67'; Lund (yellow card) 81'	Report	Wilks 20', 73'; Magennis 75'	Stadium: Spotland Stadium; Attendance: 0 Referee: Gavin Ward
Note: Held behind closed doors.

20 October 2020 7	Hull City	1–0	AFC Wimbledon	Kingston upon Hull
15:00 BST	Lewis-Potter 45+7'; Wilks (yellow card) 89'; Honeyman (yellow card) 90+3'	Report	Woodyard (yellow card) 17'; Csóka (yellow card) 78'	Stadium: KCOM Stadium; Attendance: 0 Referee: Robert Madley
Note: Held behind closed doors.

24 October 2020 8	Hull City	1–2	Peterborough United	Kingston upon Hull
15:00 BST	Elder (yellow card) 19'; Wilks 36'; Smallwood (yellow card) 65'; Honeyman (yellow card) 90+3'	Report	Thompson (yellow card) 33'; Clarke-Harris 63'; Dembélé 75'	Stadium: KCOM Stadium; Attendance: 0 Referee: Tom Nield
Note: Held behind closed doors.

27 October 2020 9	Bristol Rovers	1–3	Hull City	Horfield, Bristol
19:00 GMT	Daly 2'; McCormick (yellow card) 26'; Oztumer (yellow card) 89'; Baldwin (yellow card) 90+3'	Report	Emmanuel (yellow card) 18'; Lewis-Potter 63'; Slater 76'; Honeyman (yellow card) 88'; Elder (yellow card) 90+3'; Eaves 90+5'	Stadium: Memorial Stadium; Attendance: 0 Referee: Brett Huxtable
Note: Held behind closed doors.

31 October 2020 10	Swindon Town	2–1	Hull City	Swindon
15:00 GMT	Caddis 31'; Grant 54'	Report	Lewis-Potter 16', (yellow card) 90+5' de Wijs (yellow card) 76'; Elder (yellow card) 86'	Stadium: County Ground; Attendance: 0 Referee: Antony Coggins
Note: Held behind closed doors.

14 November 2020 11	Hull City	2–0	Burton Albion	Kingston upon Hull
15:00 GMT	Docherty (yellow card) 53'; Adelakun (yellow card) 60', (goal) 88'; Wilks 62'	Report	Hughes (yellow card) 7' (yellow-red card) 14'	Stadium: KCOM Stadium; Attendance: 0 Referee: John Busby
Note: Held behind closed doors.

21 November 2020 12	Milton Keynes Dons	1–3	Hull City	Denbigh, Bletchley
15:00 GMT	Walker 11'	Report	Magennis 8', 12'; Scott 76'	Stadium: Stadium MK; Attendance: 0 Referee: Scott Oldham
Note: Held behind closed doors.

24 November 2020 13	Ipswich Town	0–3	Hull City	Ipswich
19:00 GMT	Jackson (yellow card) 79'	Report	Wilks 2'; Magennis 45+1'; Eaves 77'	Stadium: Portman Road; Attendance: 0 Referee: Lee Swabey
Note: Held behind closed doors.

2 December 2020 14	Hull City	2–1	Doncaster Rovers	Kingston upon Hull
19:00 GMT	Magennis 26'; Smallwood (yellow card) 27'; Wilks (yellow card) 54'; Eaves 87'	Report	John-Jules 81'; Anderson (yellow card) 90+3'	Stadium: KCOM Stadium; Attendance: 0 Referee: Christopher Pollard
Note: Held behind closed doors.

5 December 2020 15	Oxford United	1–1	Hull City	Oxford
15:00 GMT	James Henry 10'; Rodriguez (yellow card) 38'; Obita (yellow card) 56'; McGuane (yellow card) 63'; Agyei (yellow card) 90'	Report	Docherty 68'	Stadium: Kassam Stadium; Attendance: 1,000; Referee: Andy Woolmer
Note: Up to 1,000 home supporters allowed under tier 2 COVID-19 regulations.

12 December 2020 16	Hull City	0–1	Shrewsbury Town	Kingston upon Hull
15:00 GMT		Report	Daniels (yellow card) 26', (goal) 27'; Pierre (yellow card) 41'; Ebanks-Landell (yellow card) 49'	Stadium: KCOM Stadium; Attendance: 0 Referee: Andy Haines
Note: Held behind closed doors.

15 December 2020 17	Blackpool	3–2	Hull City	Blackpool
19:00 GMT	Yates 45'; Anderson (yellow card) 65', (goal) 66'; Hamilton 90+3'	Report	Wilks 38'; Burke 89'; Smallwood (yellow card) 90+1'	Stadium: Bloomfield Road; Attendance: 0 Referee: Ben Speedie
Note: Held behind closed doors.

18 December 2020 18	Hull City	0–2	Portsmouth	Kingston upon Hull
17:30 GMT		Report	Greaves 6' (o.g.); Magennis 55' (o.g.)	Stadium: KCOM Stadium; Attendance: 0 Referee: Michael Salisbury
Note: Held behind closed doors.

2 January 2021 19	Hull City	2–0	Charlton Athletic	Kingston upon Hull
15:00 GMT	Adelakun 18'; Docherty 76'; Lewis-Potter (yellow card) 84'; Wilks (yellow card) 90+3'	Report	Pratley (red card) 63'; Pearce (yellow card) 71'; Gilbey (yellow card) 78'	Stadium: KCOM Stadium; Attendance: 0 Referee: Martin Coy
Note: Held behind closed doors.

9 January 2021 20	Sunderland	1–1	Hull City	Sunderland
19:45 GMT	Wright (yellow card) 14'; McGeady 21'	Report	Burke 13'; Honeyman (yellow card) 45+3'	Stadium: Stadium of Light; Attendance: 0 Referee: Scott Oldham
Note: Held behind closed doors.

16 January 2021 21	Hull City	1–1	Blackpool	Kingston upon Hull
15:00 GMT	Wilks 51'; Burke (yellow card) 66' (yellow-red card) 77'; Greaves (yellow card) 90+4'	Report	Dougall (yellow card) 27'; Yates 81'; Madine (yellow card) 90+4'	Stadium: KCOM Stadium; Attendance: 0 Referee: Samuel Barrott
Note: Held behind closed doors.

19 January 2021 22	Hull City	3–0	Accrington Stanley	Kingston upon Hull
17:30 GMT	Wilks 37'; Whyte 55'; Honeyman (yellow card) 57'; Magennis 67' (pen.); A. Jones (yellow card) 69'	Report	McConville (yellow card) 31' (yellow-red card) 66'; Burgess (yellow card) 52'	Stadium: KCOM Stadium; Attendance: 0 Referee: David Rock
Note: Held behind closed doors.

23 January 2021 23	Portsmouth	0–4	Hull City	Milton, Portsmouth
15:00 GMT	Naylor (yellow card) 87'	Report	Whatmough 23', 63' (o.g.); Honeyman 61'; Lewis-Potter (yellow card) 68'; Smallwood (yellow card) 83'; Magennis 90+1'	Stadium: Fratton Park; Attendance: 0 Referee: Ben Toner
Note: Held behind closed doors.

26 January 2021 24	Accrington Stanley	2–0	Hull City	Accrington
17:30 GMT	Charles 50'; Conneely (yellow card) 64'; Butcher 68'	Report	Elder (yellow card) 27'; Lewis-Potter (yellow card) 37'	Stadium: Crown Ground; Attendance: 0 Referee: Will Finnie
Note: Held behind closed doors.

30 January 2021 25	Hull City	1–0	Swindon Town	Kingston upon Hull
15:00 GMT	Docherty 5'	Report	Lyden (yellow card) 62'	Stadium: KCOM Stadium; Attendance: 0 Referee: Trevor Kettle
Note: Held behind closed doors.

6 February 2021 26	Burton Albion	1–0	Hull City	Burton upon Trent
15:00 GMT	Coyle (yellow card) 90+3'	Report	Edwards (yellow card) 26'; Earl (yellow card) 61'; Smith 90'	Stadium: Pirelli Stadium; Attendance: 0 Referee: Sam Allison
Note: Held behind closed doors.

9 February 2021 27	Hull City	0–0	Lincoln City	Kingston upon Hull
19:00 GMT	Coyle (yellow card) 43'; Docherty (yellow card) 90+3'	Report	McGrandles (yellow card) 23'; Rogers (yellow card) 50'; Grant (yellow card) 89'	Stadium: KCOM Stadium; Attendance: 0 Referee: Seb Stockbridge
Note: Held behind closed doors.

13 February 2021 28	Hull City	0–1	Milton Keynes Dons	Kingston upon Hull
15:00 GMT	Coyle (yellow card) 86'	Report	Fraser 80' (pen.)	Stadium: KCOM Stadium; Attendance: 0 Referee: Declan Bourne
Note: Held behind closed doors.

17 February 2021 29	Wigan Athletic	0–5	Hull City	Wigan
17:30 GMT	Johnston (yellow card) 55'	Report	Wilks 27', 32', 64'; Lewis-Potter 49'; Magennis 53'	Stadium: DW Stadium; Attendance: 0 Referee: James Oldham
Note: Held behind closed doors.

20 February 2021 30	Doncaster Rovers	3–3	Hull City	Doncaster
15:00 GMT	James 33'; Bogle 68' (pen.); Coppinger 90+12'	Report	Wilks 19', 24'; Magennis 38' (Note: Goal allocated to Josh Magennis by the Dubious Goals Committee after being originally claimed by Jacob Greaves.); Docherty (yellow card) 55'; Honeyman (yellow card) 61'; Coyle (yellow card) 80'	Stadium: Keepmoat Stadium; Referee: Charles Breakspear
Note: Held behind closed doors.

23 February 2021 31	Hull City	0–1	Ipswich Town	Kingston upon Hull
19:00 GMT	Wilks (yellow card) 56'; Elder (yellow card) 89'	Report	Norwood 15'; Nsiala (yellow card) 51'; Bennetts (yellow card) 58'; Kenlock (yellow card) 77'	Stadium: KCOM Stadium; Attendance: 0 Referee: Tom Nield
Note: Held behind closed doors.

27 February 2021 32	AFC Wimbledon	0–3	Hull City	Wimbledon
15:00 GMT	Woodyard (yellow card) 63'	Report	Magennis 24' (pen.); Burke 43'; Wilks 64' (pen.)	Stadium: Plough Lane; Attendance: 0 Referee: Craig Hicks
Note: Held behind closed doors.

2 March 2021 33	Hull City	2–0	Rochdale	Kingston upon Hull
19:00 GMT	Wilks 24'; Osho 69' (o.g.); Slater (yellow card) 86'	Report	McShane (yellow card) 72'; Shaughnessy (red card) 77'	Stadium: KCOM Stadium; Attendance: 0 Referee: James Bell
Note: Held behind closed doors.

6 March 2021 34	Hull City	2–0	Bristol Rovers	Kingston upon Hull
15:00 GMT	Whyte 32', 60'; Honeyman (yellow card) 68'; Greaves (yellow card) 80'; Eaves (yellow card) 81'	Report	Rodman (yellow card) 58'; Leahy (yellow card) 68'	Stadium: KCOM Stadium; Attendance: 0 Referee: Sam Purkiss
Note: Held behind closed doors.

9 March 2021 35	Peterborough United	1–3	Hull City	Peterborough
19:00 GMT	Brown 8'; Hamilton (yellow card) 28' (yellow-red card) 41'; Kent (yellow card) 59'; Dembélé (yellow card) 90+4'	Report	Burke 21'; Lewis-Potter 49'; Wilks 60' (pen.)	Stadium: Weston Homes Stadium; Attendance: 0 Referee: John Busby
Note: Held behind closed doors.

13 March 2021 36	Hull City	2–0	Oxford United	Kingston upon Hull
15:00 GMT	Lewis-Potter 22', 71'; Docherty (yellow card) 40'	Report		Stadium: KCOM Stadium; Attendance: 0 Referee: Anthony Backhouse
Note: Held behind closed doors.

20 March 2021 37	Shrewsbury Town	1–1	Hull City	Shrewsbury
15:00 GMT	Brad Walker (yellow card) 30'; Ingram 53' (o.g.); Davis (yellow card) 68'; Norburn (yellow card) 70'; Vela (yellow card) 77'; Ogbeta (yellow card) 87'	Report	Honeyman (yellow card) 55'; Docherty 62'	Stadium: New Meadow; Attendance: 0 Referee: Gavin Ward
Note: Held behind closed doors.

27 March 2021 38	Hull City	1–1	Gillingham	Kingston upon Hull
15:00 GMT	Eaves 9'; Greaves (yellow card) 37'	Report	O'Keefe (yellow card) 64'; Lee 67'; MacDonald (yellow card) 71'; O'Connor (yellow card) 90+7'	Stadium: KCOM Stadium; Attendance: 0 Referee: Martin Coy
Note: Held behind closed doors.

2 April 2021 39	Crewe Alexandra	1–2	Hull City	Crewe
15:00 BST	Porter 66' (pen.); Kirk (yellow card) 84'	Report	Honeyman (yellow card) 63'; Lewis-Potter (yellow card) 65'; Magennis 71' (pen.); Docherty (yellow card) 73'; Wilks 90+1'	Stadium: Alexandra Stadium; Attendance: 0 Referee: Christopher Pollard
Note: Held behind closed doors.

5 April 2021 40	Hull City	3–0	Northampton Town	Kingston upon Hull
15:00 BST	Elder 30'; Lewis-Potter 44'; Whyte 90+3'	Report	Horsfall (yellow card) 27'; Sheehan (yellow card) 48'; McWilliams (yellow card) 71'	Stadium: KCOM Stadium; Attendance: 0 Referee: Thomas Bramall
Note: Held behind closed doors.

10 April 2021 41	Plymouth Argyle	0–3	Hull City	Plymouth
15:00 BST	Watts (yellow card) 4'	Report	Lewis-Potter 11'; Magennis 58'; Docherty 74'	Stadium: Home Park; Attendance: 0 Referee: Ben Toner
Note: Held behind closed doors.

17 April 2021 42	Hull City	2–1	Fleetwood Town	Kingston upon Hull
12:30 BST	Magennis 61'; Lewis-Potter 70'	Report	Donacien (yellow card) 6'; Vassell 22'	Stadium: KCOM Stadium; Attendance: 0 Referee: Ollie Yates
Note: Held behind closed doors.

20 April 2021 43	Hull City	2–2	Sunderland	Kingston upon Hull
19:45 BST	Magennis 28', 64'; Lewis-Potter (yellow card) 50'; Wilks (yellow card) 61'	Report	Jones 10'; Wright (yellow card) 16'; Wyke (yellow card) 20'; Leadbitter 34' (pen.); O'Nien (yellow card) 89'	Stadium: KCOM Stadium; Attendance: 0 Referee: Charles Breakspear
Note: Held behind closed doors.

24 April 2021 44	Lincoln City	1–2	Hull City	Lincoln
15:00 BST	Grant (yellow card) 30'; McGrandles (yellow card) 35'; Montsma 65'	Report	Magennis 4'; Honeyman (yellow card) 17'; Wilks (yellow card) 57', (goal) 83' (pen.); Eaves (yellow card) 88'	Stadium: Sincil Bank; Attendance: 0 Referee: Sam Purkiss
Note: Held behind closed doors.

1 May 2021 45	Hull City	3–1	Wigan Athletic	Kingston upon Hull
15:00 BST	Lewis-Potter 17'; Honeyman 22', (yellow card) 79'; Smallwood (yellow card) 57'; Magennis 66'	Report	Dodoo 19', (yellow card) 45+1'; Lang (yellow card) 44'	Stadium: KCOM Stadium; Attendance: 0 Referee: Robert Madley
Note: Held behind closed doors.

9 May 2021 46	Charlton Athletic	1–0	Hull City	Charlton, London
12:00 BST	Gilbey (yellow card) 30'; Inniss (yellow card) 42'; Greaves 75' (o.g.)	Report	Docherty (yellow card) 67'; Wood (yellow card) 90+2'	Stadium: The Valley; Attendance: 0 Referee: Martin Coy
Note: Held behind closed doors.

=== FA Cup ===
Hull entered the cup in round one, the draw for which took place on 26 October 2020. Hull were drawn at home to Fleetwood Town. The match took place on 7 November 2020 with a 3:00 kick-off. The game started with a minutes silence as part of the Remembrance Day commemorations. The first action was in the third-minute when Fleetwood's Ched Evans collided with Callum Elder and after a long delay was stretchered off the field. Hull struck in the 31st-minute through a Josh Magennis volley. A second blow for Fleetwood, just before half-time, saw Harvey Saunders clash with George Long and him also being stretchered off the field. Following the break Hull went further ahead through a Reece Burke header of a Callum Elder corner. The game finished 2–0 in Hull City's favour and allowed them to progress to the second round draw. The second round draw was made on Monday, 9 November by Danny Cowley, with Hull drawn away to Stevenage. The match took place on 29 November 2020, the first half saw both keepers making saves to keep the game scoreless at the break. Early in the second half Arthur Iontton brought down Martin Samuelsen in the box and Hull were awarded a penalty that was converted by Tom Eaves. Elliott List brought the home-side level in the 79th-minute. With neither side able to find another goal the match went to extra-time and then to penalties, Sevenage running out winners 6–5.

Win Draw Loss Postponed

7 November 2020 First round	Hull City	2–0	Fleetwood Town	Kingston upon Hull
15:00 GMT	Magennis 31'; Burke 63'; Smallwood (yellow card) 90+4'	Report	Connolly (yellow card) 58'; Madden (yellow card) 66'; Holgate (yellow card) 86'	Stadium: KCOM Stadium; Attendance: 0 Referee: Marc Edwards
Note: Held behind closed doors.

29 November 2020 Second round	Stevenage	1–1 (a.e.t.) (6–5 p)	Hull City	Stevenage
13:30 GMT	Hutton (yellow card) 64'; List 79'; Newton (yellow card) 98'; Vincelot (yellow card) 115'	Report	Eaves 52' (pen.); Slater (yellow card) 69'	Stadium: Lamex Stadium; Attendance: 0 Referee: Sam Allison
	Penalties
	Pett (penalty missed); Smith (penalty scored); List (penalty scored); Read (penalty scored); Newton (penalty scored); Vincelot (penalty scored); Coker (penalty scored)		Coyle (penalty scored); C. Jones (penalty scored); Eaves (penalty missed); Chadwick (penalty scored); Lewis-Potter (penalty scored); A. Jones (penalty scored); McLoughlin (penalty missed)
Note: Held behind closed doors.

=== EFL Cup ===
The first round of the EFL Cup is scheduled to take place on 5 September 2020 with the draw taking place at 10:00 a.m. on 18 August 2020. Hull City are in the northern section of the draw and were drawn away to Sunderland. Sunderland started the match with several attempts in the first half but Hull kept a clean sheet. In the second half Sunderland's Will Grigg had a goal disallowed for off-side and as neither side broke the dead-lock the match went to penalties. Grigg took the first penalty and hit the legs of goalkeeper Matt Ingram, the remainder of the penalties were converted and Hull progressed to the second round. The draw for both the second and third round were confirmed on 6 September, live on Sky Sports by Phil Babb. Hull were drawn away to Leeds United in round two with the match taking place week commencing 14 September 2020. It was later confirmed that the match would take place on 16 September. If they progress then in round three they will face either West Ham United or Charlton Athletic. That game took place on 15 September 2020, with West Ham United securing a 3–0 win to progress to round three.

The following day Hull travelled to Elland Road to take on Leeds United and started well with Mallik Wilks opening the scoring with a deflected shot after 5-minutes. Though they had several chances they could not add to their lead. Leeds meanwhile had few chances, but deep into stoppage time Ezgjan Alioski levelled the score and took the match to penalties. With each side missing one penalty of their set of five it went to sudden death. Jamie Shackleton missed penalty ten for Leeds leaving Alfie Jones to convert his spot-kick to put Hull through to the third round 9–8 on penalties.

The third-round match against West Ham United took place at the London Stadium on 22 November 2020. Before the game United manager David Moyes and two players, Issa Diop and Josh Cullen, had to leave the stadium after testing positive for coronavirus. West Ham opened the scoring through ex-tiger Robert Snodgrass hitting the net after 18-minutes. Sébastien Haller doubled their lead on the stroke of half-time. Sean McLoughlin conceded a penalty that Andriy Yarmolenko converted for West Ham's third 5-minutes after the break before Mallik Wilks replied for Hull in the 70th-minute. Both Yarmolenko and Haller got on the score-sheet in added time to put West Ham through to the fourth round 5–1.

Win Draw Loss Postponed

5 September 2020 First round	Sunderland	0–0 (4–5 p)	Hull City	Sunderland
15:00 BST	Hume (yellow card) 55'	Report	Fleming (yellow card) 45+2'; Samuelsen (yellow card) 90+4'	Stadium: Stadium of Light; Attendance: 0 Referee: Thomas Bramall
	Penalties
	Grigg (penalty missed); Power (penalty scored); O'Nien (penalty scored); Gooch (penalty scored); Wyke (penalty scored)		Wilks (penalty scored); Smallwood (penalty scored); Samuelsen (penalty scored); Honeyman (penalty scored); Lewis-Potter (penalty scored)
Note: Held behind closed doors.

16 September 2020 Second round	Leeds United	1–1 (8–9 p)	Hull City	Leeds
19:45 BST	Alioski (yellow card) 45+1', (goal) 90+3'	Report	Wilks 5'; Scott (yellow card) 90+2'	Stadium: Elland Road; Attendance: 0 Referee: David Webb
	Penalties
	Rodrigo (penalty scored); Alioski (penalty missed); Roberts (penalty scored); Poveda-Ocampo (penalty scored); Douglas (penalty scored); Struijk (penalty scored); Davis (penalty scored); Gotts (penalty scored); Casilla (penalty scored); Shackleton (penalty missed)		Docherty (penalty scored); C. Jones (penalty scored); Coyle (penalty missed); Scott (penalty scored); Mayer (penalty scored); Elder (penalty scored); McLoughlin (penalty scored); Chadwick (penalty scored); Batty (penalty scored); A. Jones (penalty scored)
Note: Held behind closed doors.

22 September 2020 Third round	West Ham United	5–1	Hull City	Stratford, London
19:30 BST	Snodgrass 18'; Haller 45', 90+1'; Yarmolenko 56' (pen.), 90+2'	Report	McLoughlin (yellow card) 55'; Honeyman (yellow card) 59'; Fleming (yellow card) 65'; Wilks 70'	Stadium: London Stadium; Attendance: 0 Referee: Simon Hooper
Note: Held behind closed doors.

=== EFL Trophy ===
The regional group stage draw was confirmed at 1.30 p.m. on 18 August 2020. Hull were placed in Group H of the northern section along with Grimsby Town, Harrogate Town and Leicester City U21. Hull topped the group table and were guaranteed a home game in the second round, the draw for which took place on 20 November 2020. Hull were drawn to play Crewe Alexandra with the match taking place week beginning 7 December 2020. The match took place on 8 December 2020, but the match remained deadlocked at full-time with neither side managing to score a goal. The match went to penalties and Hull squeezed through 3–2 on penalties. The draw for the third round took place on 10 December 2020 and Hull were again drawn at home this time to Fleetwood Town. The match took place on 12 January 2021, Fleetwood got off to a good start with Paddy Madden netting after 8-minutes. Wes Burns doubled their lead soon after the break. Hull left it late to reply with Mallik Wilks finding the net in the 78th-minute, with Keane Lewis-Potter levelling the score two minutes later. In extra-time Lewie Coyle scored his first goal for the club, an absolute thunderbolt, to put Hull through to the next round with a score of 3–2. On 22 January 2021, it was announced that the draw for the quarter-finals of the cup would take place the following day, Sam Parkin doing the draw. Matches would take place week-commencing 1 February 2021. Hull were again drawn at home this time to Lincoln City. The date for the match was later confirmed as 2 February 2021. Lincoln got off to a good start when Harry Anderson scored after 7-minutes. Hull levelled through Greg Docherty after 60-minutes. Both teams pressed but could not break the deadlock and the match went to penalties. Lincoln went through 3–4 on penalties.

==== Group table ====
Pos	Div	Team	Pld	W	PW	PL	L	GF	GA	GD	Pts	Qualification
1	L1	Hull City	3	2	0	0	1	6	2	+4	6	Advance to Round 2
2	ACA	Leicester City U21	3	2	0	0	1	6	5	+1	6	Advance to Round 2
3	L2	Harrogate Town	3	1	0	1	1	5	5	0	4	
4	L2	Grimsby Town	3	0	1	0	2	3	8	−5	2	

Source: EFL.com

==== Matches ====
Win Draw Loss Postponed

8 September 2020 Group H match 1	Hull City	1–2	Leicester City U21	Kingston upon Hull
17:30 BST	Lewis-Potter 66'	Report	Reghba (yellow card) 33'; Wright 50'; Hirst 90+5' (pen.)	Stadium: KCOM Stadium; Attendance: 0 Referee: R. Joyce
Note: Held behind closed doors.

6 October 2020 Group H match 2	Hull City	v	Grimsby Town	Kingston upon Hull
19:45 BST		Report		Stadium: KCOM Stadium
Note: Postponed due to Grimsby Town player testing positive for coronavirus.

10 November 2020 Group H match 3	Harrogate Town	0–2	Hull City	Harrogate
19:00 GMT		Report	Scott 75'; C. Jones 85' (pen.)	Stadium: Wetherby Road; Attendance: 0 Referee: Wright
Note: Held behind closed doors.

17 November 2020 Group H match 2	Hull City	3–0	Grimsby Town	Kingston upon Hull
17:30 GMT	Samuelsen 27', 32'; McLoughlin (yellow card) 59'; Scott 79'	Report	Wright (yellow card) 3'; Edwards (yellow card) 64'	Stadium: KCOM Stadium; Attendance: 0 Referee: Darren Drysdale
Note: Held behind closed doors.

8 December 2020 Round 2	Hull City	0–0 (3–2 p)	Crewe Alexandra	Kingston upon Hull
17:30 GMT	Arthur (yellow card) 87'	Report	Porter (yellow card) 19'; Nolan (yellow card) 55'	Stadium: KCOM Stadium; Attendance: 0 Referee: James Bell
	Penalties
	Docherty (penalty missed); Chadwick (penalty scored); Coyle (penalty scored); Wilks (penalty missed); Adelakun (penalty scored)		Porter (penalty scored); Finney (penalty missed); Griffiths (penalty missed); Zanzala (penalty missed); Ng (penalty scored)
Note: Held behind closed doors.

12 January 2021 Round 3	Hull City	3–2	Fleetwood Town	Kingston upon Hull
17:30 GMT	Wilks 78'; Lewis-Potter 80'; Coyle 90+4'	Report	Madden 8'; Burns 53'; Hill (yellow card) 82'; Connolly (yellow card) 90'; Matete (yellow card) 90+1'	Stadium: KCOM Stadium; Attendance: 0 Referee: Ross Joyce
Note: Held behind closed doors.

2 February 2021 Round 4	Hull City	1–1 (3–4 p)	Lincoln City	Kingston upon Hull
19:45 GMT	Docherty 60'; Flores (yellow card) 90+2'	Report	Anderson 7'; Jones (yellow card) 86'	Stadium: KCOM Stadium; Attendance: 0 Referee: Robert Madley
	Penalties
	Smallwood (penalty missed); Scott (penalty missed); Chadwick (penalty scored); Lewis-Potter (penalty scored); Elder (penalty scored); Flores (penalty missed)		Jones (penalty scored); Montsma (penalty missed); Anderson (penalty missed); Scully (penalty scored); Grant (penalty scored); Johnson (penalty scored)
Note: Held behind closed doors.

== Statistics ==
=== Appearances ===
As of 9 May 2021.

No.	Pos	Nat	Player	Total		League One		FA Cup		League Cup		Trophy	
No.	Pos	Nat	Player	Apps	Goals	Apps	Goals	Apps	Goals	Apps	Goals	Apps	Goals
1	GK	(England) ENG	George Long	13	0	8	0	2	0	1	0	2	0
2	DF	(England) ENG	Lewie Coyle	34	1	26+2	0	1	0	2	0	3	1
3	DF	(Australia) AUS	Callum Elder	48	1	43+1	1	1	0	1	0	2	0
4	DF	(Netherlands) NED	Jordy de Wijs	9	0	7	0	1	0	1	0	0	0
5	DF	(England) ENG	Reece Burke	37	5	31+3	4	1	1	1	0	1	0
6	MF	(England) ENG	Richie Smallwood	31	0	23+4	0	1	0	2	0	1	0
7	FW	(England) ENG	Mallik Wilks	50	22	42+2	19	1	0	2+1	2	1+1	1
8	MF	(England) ENG	Daniel Batty	13	0	2+4	0	1	0	2	0	4	0
9	FW	(England) ENG	Tom Eaves	23	5	6+12	4	1	1	1	0	3	0
10	MF	(England) ENG	George Honeyman	47	4	42	4	1	0	2+1	0	0+1	0
11	FW	(Scotland) SCO	James Scott	27	3	3+15	1	2	0	2	0	2+3	2
12	DF	(England) ENG	Josh Emmanuel	30	0	21+6	0	1	0	1	0	1	0
13	GK	(England) ENG	Matt Ingram	43	0	38	0	0	0	2	0	3	0
14	MF	(Norway) NOR	Martin Samuelsen	10	2	0+5	0	1	0	1	0	3	2
15	DF	(England) ENG	Alfie Jones	39	0	27+4	0	2	0	2	0	4	0
16	MF	(England) ENG	Hakeeb Adelakun	17	3	11+3	3	0	0	0	0	2+1	0
16	MF	(England) ENG	Jordan Flores	4	0	0+3	0	0	0	0	0	0+1	0
17	DF	(Republic of Ireland) IRL	Sean McLoughlin	12	0	0+3	0	1	0	2	0	6	0
18	MF	(England) ENG	Regan Slater	35	1	11+15	1	1+1	0	2	0	5	0
19	FW	(England) ENG	Keane Lewis-Potter	51	15	33+10	13	0+2	0	1+2	0	2+1	2
20	MF	(England) ENG	Daniel Crowley	23	0	6+16	0	0	0	0	0	1	0
21	DF	(England) ENG	Brandon Fleming	9	0	3	0	0+1	0	2	0	3	0
22	MF	(Austria) AUT	Thomas Mayer	14	0	1+5	0	1+1	0	1+1	0	3+1	0
23	MF	(Northern Ireland) NIR	Gavin Whyte	20	4	10+10	4	0	0	0	0	0	0
24	DF	(England) ENG	Jacob Greaves	41	0	39	0	1	0	0	0	1	0
25	DF	(Ghana) GHA	Festus Arthur	2	0	0	0	0	0	0	0	2	0
27	FW	(Northern Ireland) NIR	Josh Magennis	44	19	29+11	18	1	1	1	0	2	0
28	MF	(England) ENG	Max Sheaf	3	0	0	0	0	0	0	0	2+1	0
30	MF	(England) ENG	Jordan Hickey	1	0	0	0	0	0	0	0	0+1	0
31	MF	(England) ENG	Billy Chadwick	9	0	0+3	0	0+1	0	1	0	0+4	0
32	GK	(England) ENG	Harvey Cartwright	1	0	0	0	0	0	0	0	1	0
33	MF	(Scotland) SCO	Greg Docherty	47	6	44	5	0	0	1	0	2	1
34	MF	(England) ENG	Callum Jones	7	1	0+1	0	0+1	0	1+1	0	3	1
35	FW	(England) ENG	James Berry	1	0	0	0	0	0	0	0	1	0
37	DF	(England) ENG	Andy Smith	1	0	0	0	0	0	0	0	1	0
38	MF	(England) ENG	Harry Wood	1	0	0+1	0	0	0	0	0	0	0
40	MF	(England) ENG	Ahmed Salam	2	0	0	0	0	0	0	0	0+2	0

- Source: Compiled from competitive match reports

Note: Appearances shown after a "+" indicate player came on during course of match.

=== Top goalscorers ===
Player	Number	Position	League One	FA Cup	League Cup	Trophy	Total
(England) Mallik Wilks	7	FW	19	0	2	1	22
(Northern Ireland) Josh Magennis	27	FW	18	1	0	0	19
(England) Keane Lewis-Potter	19	FW	13	0	0	2	15
(Scotland) Greg Docherty	33	MF	5	0	0	1	6
(England) Reece Burke	5	DF	4	1	0	0	5
(England) Tom Eaves	9	FW	4	1	0	0	5
(England) George Honeyman	10	MF	4	0	0	0	4
(Wales) Gavin Whyte	23	MF	4	0	0	0	4
(England) Hakeeb Adelakun	16	MF	3	0	0	0	3
(Scotland) James Scott	11	FW	1	0	0	2	3
(Norway) Martin Samuelsen	14	MF	0	0	0	2	2
(England) Lewie Coyle	2	DF	0	0	0	1	1
(Australia) Callum Elder	3	DF	1	0	0	0	1
(England) Callum Jones	34	MF	0	0	0	1	1
(England) Regan Slater	15	MF	1	0	0	0	1
(England) Jacob Greaves	24	DF	0	0	0	0	0
Total			77	3	2	9	91

=== Disciplinary record ===
Player	Number	Position	League One		FA Cup		League Cup		Trophy		Total	
Player	Number	Position	Booked	Sent off (straight red)	Booked	Sent off (straight red)	Booked	Sent off (straight red)	Booked	Sent off (straight red)	Booked	Sent off (straight red)
(England) Reece Burke	5	DF	1	1	0	0	0	0	0	0	1	1
(England) George Honeyman	10	MF	12	0	0	0	1	0	0	0	13	0
(Scotland) Greg Docherty	33	MF	7	0	0	0	0	0	0	0	7	0
(England) Richie Smallwood	6	MF	6	0	1	0	0	0	0	0	7	0
(England) Mallik Wilks	7	FW	7	0	0	0	0	0	0	0	7	0
(Australia) Callum Elder	3	DF	6	0	0	0	0	0	0	0	6	0
(England) Keane Lewis-Potter	19	FW	6	0	0	0	0	0	0	0	6	0
(England) Lewie Coyle	2	DF	4	0	0	0	0	0	0	0	4	0
(England) Jacob Greaves	24	DF	3	0	0	0	0	0	0	0	3	0
(Netherlands) Jordy de Wijs	4	DF	2	0	0	0	0	0	0	0	2	0
(England) Tom Eaves	9	FW	2	0	0	0	0	0	0	0	2	0
(England) Brandon Fleming	21	DF	0	0	0	0	2	0	0	0	2	0
(Republic of Ireland) Sean McLoughlin	17	DF	0	0	0	0	1	0	1	0	2	0
(England) Regan Slater	15	MF	1	0	1	0	0	0	0	0	2	0
(Ghana) Festus Arthur	25	DF	0	0	0	0	0	0	1	0	1	0
(England) Hakeeb Adelakun	16	MF	1	0	0	0	0	0	0	0	1	0
(England) Josh Emmanuel	12	DF	1	0	0	0	0	0	0	0	1	0
(England) Jordan Flores	16	MF	0	0	0	0	0	0	1	0	1	0
(England) Alfie Jones	15	DF	1	0	0	0	0	0	0	0	1	0
(Northern Ireland) Josh Magennis	27	FW	1	0	0	0	0	0	0	0	1	0
(Austria) Thomas Mayer	22	MF	1	0	0	0	0	0	0	0	1	0
(Norway) Martin Samuelsen	14	MF	0	0	0	0	1	0	0	0	1	0
(Scotland) James Scott	11	FW	0	0	0	0	1	0	0	0	1	0
(England) Harry Wood	38	MF	1	0	0	0	0	0	0	0	1	0
Total			59	1	2	0	6	0	3	0	69	1

== Kits ==
On 25 September 2020, the club announced that local company Giacom will be the main shirt sponsors for the 2020–21 season. The following day the club unveiled the new home kit for the season, the shirts described as "classic amber and black stripes with solid amber sleeves". The shorts are to be black with amber side panels while the socks are amber with black cuff top.

The third kit was revealed on 9 September 2020, as a white shirt with Ibiza Blue upper chest and sleeves. The shorts are Ibiza Blue with white trim and the socks being white with Ibiza Blue cuff top.

The away kit was revealed on 17 September 2020, as a carbon grey and black pattern forming a KCOM Stadium stanchion pattern on the shirt. The shorts are black with vertical amber tipping, while the socks are black with amber hoops.

== Awards ==
The annual awards for the club saw George Honeyman pick-up the Player of the Year, Players' Player of the Year and Supporters' Player of the Year awards. Lewie Coyle was presented with the Goal of the Season award for his goal against Fleetwood Town on 12 January 2021 in the EFL Trophy. Jacob Greaves took the award for Young Player of the Year.
