= 2025 Shelbourne F.C. season =

Irish football club season

Shelbourne
2025 season
- CEO: Barry Mocke (to Jan 2025); Neil Doyle (Interim Jan–Apr); Tomás Quinn (from Apr 2025)
- Head Coach: Damien Duff (resigned 22 June 2025); Joey O'Brien (from 5 July)
- Stadium: Tolka Park, Dublin
- Premier Division: 3rd
- Leinster Senior Cup: Third Round
- FAI Cup: Third round
- UEFA Champions League: Second Qualifying Round
- UEFA Europa League: Third Qualifying Round
- UEFA Conference League: League Phase
- President's Cup: Winners
- Top goalscorer: League: Harry Wood (9); All: Mipo Odubeko (12)
- Highest home attendance: 10,143 v Crystal Palace; 11 December 2025 (UEFA Conference League)
- Lowest home attendance: 3,539 v Drogheda United; 19 May 2025 (Premier Division)
- Biggest win: 4-0 v Fairview Rangers; 19 July 2025 (FAI Cup)
- Biggest defeat: 0–3 v Drogheda United; 14 January 2025 (Leinster Senior Cup) 0–3 v Qarabağ FK; 23 July 2025 (UEFA Champions League) 0–3 v Crystal Palace; 11 December2025 (UEFA Conference League)
Home colours	Away colours	Third colours
- All statistics correct as of 26 April 2025.

The 2025 Shelbourne F.C. season is the club's 130th season in existence. They were the defending League of Ireland Premier Division champions following their title win in the 2024 season, and it was their first season back in UEFA Champions League qualifiers since 2005.

In November 2024, Chadwick's, a builders' providers, was announced as the main shirt sponsor for both senior teams within the club. The deal would also include Chadwick's working with the club to enhance improvements around Tolka Park.

In January, the club announced the departure of CEO Barry Mocke. Two days later, the club announced Tomás Quinn as new CEO starting in April. Quinn is a former Dublin GAA footballer and was their serving Commercial and Marketing Director.

On 29 January, Shelbourne announced an exclusive partnership with Jamestown Analytics a "groundbreaking provider of football data analysis" who also partner with Brighton & Hove Albion, Como, Union Saint-Gilloise, and Hearts.

On 21 May, the club announced an 18 year lease on part of the Athletic Union League Complex in Clonshaugh, County Dublin.

On 22 June, Damien Duff resigned as first team manager. On 4 July, having taking temporary charge of first team affairs, former Assistant Manager Joey O'Brien was confirmed as Head Coach on a permanent basis.

On 28 August 2025, Shelbourne completed a 5-1 aggregate victory over Linfield in a play-off to qualify for the League Phase of the 2025–26 UEFA Conference League. This marked the club's first ever group stage/league phase qualification in European competition.

Defender Paddy Barrett was named in the 2025 PFAI Team of the Year. Midfielder Kerr McInroy was named as Shelbourne's Player of the Year for 2025.

== First team squad ==
Players' ages are as of the opening day of the 2025 season.

#	Name	Nationality	Position	Date of birth (age)	Previous club	Signed	Notes
Goalkeepers
1	Conor Kearns	(Republic of Ireland)	GK	6 May 1998 (aged 26)	Galway United	2023	
13	Wessel Speel	(Netherlands)	GK	17 October 2001 (aged 23)	Minnesota United FC	2025	Loan, signed mid-season
19	Lorcan Healy	(Republic of Ireland)	GK	9 January 2001 (aged 23)	UCD	2024	
Defenders
2	Sean Gannon	(Republic of Ireland)	DF	11 July 1991 (aged 33)	Shamrock Rovers	2024	
3	Tyreke Wilson	(Republic of Ireland)	DF	2 December 1999 (aged 25)	Bohemians	2023	
4	Kameron Ledwidge	(Republic of Ireland)	DF	7 April 2001 (aged 23)	Southampton	2021	
15	Sam Bone	(England)	DF	6 February 1998 (aged 27)	Maidstone United	2024	
18	James Norris	(England)	DF	4 April 2003 (aged 21)	Liverpool F.C.	2025	Season-long loan
24	Lewis Temple	(Republic of Ireland)	DF	11 June 2005 (aged 19)	Youth Team	2022	
25	Milan Mbeng	(France)	DF	6 April 2002 (aged 22)	Cork City F.C.	2025	Signed mid-season
29	Paddy Barrett	(Republic of Ireland)	DF	22 July 1993 (aged 31)	St Patrick's Athletic	2023	Vice-Captain
55	James Roche	(Republic of Ireland)	DF	October 2007 (aged 17)	Shamrock Rovers	2025	Youth
Midfielders
5	Ellis Chapman	(England)	MF	8 January 2001 (aged 24)	Sligo Rovers F.C.	2025	
6	Jonathan Lunney	(Republic of Ireland)	MF	2 February 1998 (aged 26)	Bohemians	2021	
7	Harry Wood	(England)	MF	2 August 2002 (aged 22)	Hull City	2024	
8	Mark Coyle	(Republic of Ireland)	MF	13 February 1997 (aged 28)	Finn Harps	2022	Captain
14	Ali Coote	(Scotland)	MF	11 June 1998 (aged 27)	Detroit City	2024	
16	John O’Sullivan	(Republic of Ireland)	MF	18 September 1993 (aged 31)	Bohemians	2024	
21	Jack Henry-Francis	(Republic of Ireland)	MF	23 September 2003 (aged 21)	Arsenal F.C.	2025	Signed mid-season
22	Sean Moore	(Republic of Ireland)	MF	3 August 2005 (aged 19)	West Ham United F.C.	2025	Signed mid-season
23	Kerr McInroy	(Scotland)	MF	31 August 2000 (aged 24)	Free Agent	2025	
27	Evan Caffrey	(Republic of Ireland)	MF	27 February 2003 (aged 21)	UCD	2023	
Attackers
9	Seán Boyd	(Republic of Ireland)	FW	20 June 1998 (aged 26)	Finn Harps	2022	
10	John Martin	(Republic of Ireland)	FW	13 March 1997 (aged 27)	Dundalk	2024	
11	Mipo Odubeko	(Republic of Ireland)	FW	21 October 2002 (aged 22)	Fleetwood Town F.C.	2025	
17	Daniel Kelly	(Republic of Ireland)	FW	21 May 1996 (aged 28)	Derry City	2025	
44	Daniel Ring	(Republic of Ireland)	FW	3 February 2007 (aged 18)	Youth Team	2024	Youth
Players who departed before the end of the season
28	Ryan O'Kane	(Republic of Ireland)	FW	16 August 2003 (aged 21)	Dundalk	2025	Loan to Sligo Rovers F.C.
77	Rayhaan Tulloch	(England)	FW	20 January 2001 (aged 24)	Shrewsbury Town F.C.	2024	Signed for Portadown F.C.

== Transfers ==
=== Transfers in ===
Date	Position	Nationality	Name	Previous club	Ref.
26 November 2024	FW	(Republic of Ireland)	Ryan O'Kane	Dundalk	
19 December 2024	FW	(Republic of Ireland)	Daniel Kelly	Derry	
19 December 2024	MF	(England)	Ellis Chapman	Sligo Rovers	
20 December 2024	FW	(Republic of Ireland)	Mipo Odubeko	Fleetwood Town	
23 January 2025	MF	(Scotland)	Kerr McInroy	Free Agent	
17 February 2025	DF	(England)	James Norris	loan from Liverpool F.C.	
18 July 2025	MF	(Republic of Ireland)	Jack Henry-Francis	Arsenal F.C.	
22 July 2025	GK	(Netherlands)	Wessel Speel	loan from Minnesota United FC	
27 July 2025	MF	(Republic of Ireland)	Sean Moore	West Ham United F.C.	
28 July 2025	DF	(France)	Milan Mbeng	Cork City F.C.	

=== Transfers out ===
Date	Position	Nationality	Name	To	Ref.
15 November 2024	FW	(Scotland)	Matty Smith	(Republic of Ireland) Waterford	
15 November 2024	FW	(Republic of Ireland)	Dean Williams	(Republic of Ireland) Athlone Town	
15 November 2024	DF	(Republic of Ireland)	Shane Griffin	(Republic of Ireland) Cobh Ramblers	
22 November 2024	MF	(Scotland)	Liam Burt	Loan return to (Republic of Ireland) Shamrock Rovers	
23 January 2025	FW	(Republic of Ireland)	Aiden O'Brien	(England) Woking F.C.	
18 July 2025	FW	(England)	Rayhaan Tulloch	(Northern Ireland) Portadown F.C.	

Loans out

Date	Position	Nationality	Name	To	Date Ended	Ref.
4 July 2025	MF	(Republic of Ireland)	Ryan O'Kane	Sligo Rovers	End of season	
24 July 2025	DF	(Republic of Ireland)	Derinsole Adewale	Athlone Town A.F.C.	End of season	

== Competitions ==
=== Overall record ===
Competition	First match	Last match	Starting round	Final position	Record							
Competition	First match	Last match	Starting round	Final position	Pld	W	D	L	GF	GA	GD	Win %
Premier Division	14 February 2025	1 November 2025	Matchday 1		36	15	14	7	48	37	+11	41.67
FAI Cup	19 July 2025	17 August 2025	Second Round	Third Round	2	1	0	1	4	2	+2	50.00
UEFA Champions League	9 July 2025	30 July 2025	First qualifying round	Second qualifying round	4	1	1	2	2	4	−2	25.00
UEFA Europa League	6 August 2025	12 August 2025	Third qualifying round	Third qualifying round	2	1	0	1	3	4	−1	50.00
UEFA Conference League	21 August 2025	18 December 2025	Third qualifying round	League Phase	8	2	2	4	5	8	−3	25.00
Leinster Senior Cup	14 January 2025	4 February 2025	Third Round	Third Round	3	1	0	2	4	7	−3	33.33
President of Ireland's Cup	7 February 2025		Final	Winners	1	1	0	0	2	0	+2	100.00
Total					56	22	17	17	68	62	+6	39.29

Last updated: 29 Aug 2025
Source: Competitions

=== President of Ireland's Cup ===
7 February 2025 Final	Shelbourne	2-0	Drogheda United	Drumcondra
19:45 IST	Mipo Odubeko 28' Seán Boyd 34'	Report	L. Dennison (red card) 54'	Stadium: Tolka Park; Attendance: 4,584; Referee: Paul Norton

=== League of Ireland ===
Pos	Team	Pld	W	D	L	GF	GA	GD	Pts	Qualification or relegation
1	Shamrock Rovers (C)	36	19	9	8	56	33	+23	66	Qualification for Champions League first qualifying round
2	Derry City	36	18	9	9	52	39	+13	63	Qualification for Europa League first qualifying round (Note: Shamrock Rovers won the 2025 FAI Cup, meaning the Europa League berth went to the second place team Derry City. The two Conference League berths went to the third and fourth place teams, Shelbourne and Bohemians respectively.)
3	Shelbourne	36	15	14	7	48	37	+11	59	Qualification for Conference League second qualifying round
4	Bohemians	36	16	6	14	48	39	+9	54	Qualification for Conference League first qualifying round
5	St Patrick's Athletic	36	13	13	10	42	32	+10	52	

Source: SSE Airtricity League, Soccerway
Rules for classification: 1) Points; 2) Goal difference; 3) Goals scored.
(C) Champions

==== Results by round ====
Round	1	2	3	4	5	6	7	8	9	10	11	12	13	14	15	16	17	18	19	20	21	22	23	24	25	26	27	28	29	30	31	32	33	34	35	36
Ground	H	A	H	A	H	H	A	A	H	A	H	A	A	H	H	A	H	H	A	H	A	H	A	A	H	A	H	H	A	A	H	A	A	H	A	H
Result	W	W	D	D	L	D	W	D	W	D	D	D	L	L	W	L	D	W	D	L	W	L	D	D	W	W	D	W	D	L	W	W	W	W	W	D
Position	1	1	1	3	3	4	4	4	3	4	4	5	6	7	5	6	6	6	5	6	5	6	5	5	5	5	5	4	4	6	6	4	3	3	3	3
Points	3	6	7	8	8	9	12	13	16	17	18	19	19	19	22	22	23	26	27	27	30	30	31	32	35	38	39	42	43	43	46	49	52	55	58	59

Updated to match(es) played on 1 November 2025. Source: 2025 League of Ireland Premier Division
A = Away; H = Home; W = Win; D = Draw; L = Loss

14 February 2025 1	Shelbourne	3–1	Derry City	Drumcondra
19:45 IST	Seán Boyd 11', 45' (pen.); Evan Caffrey 15'	Report	Michael Duffy 14'	Stadium: Tolka Park; Attendance: 4,780; Referee: Rob Harvey

21 February 2025 2	Waterford	0–1	Shelbourne	Waterford
19:45 IST	Ryan Burke (red card) 60'	Report	Mipo Odubeko 13'	Stadium: RSC; Attendance: 3,488; Referee: Paul Norton

28 February 2025 3	Shelbourne	1–1	Shamrock Rovers	Drumcondra
19:45 IST	Harry Wood 3'	Report	Aaron McEneff 16'	Stadium: Tolka Park; Attendance: 5,214; Referee: Neil Doyle

03 March 2025 4	Galway United	1–1	Shelbourne	Galway
19:45 IST	John Martin (o.g.)	Report	Evan Caffrey 52'	Stadium: Eamonn Deacy Park; Attendance: 3,449; Referee: Rob Hennessy

07 March 2025 5	Shelbourne	0–1	Drogheda United	Drumcondra
19:45 IST		Report	Warren Davis 4'	Stadium: Tolka Park; Attendance: 4,742; Referee: Damien McGrath

14 March 2025 6	Shelbourne	1–1	Cork City	Drumcondra
19:45 IST	Evan Caffrey 70'	Report	Ruairí Keating 50'	Stadium: Tolka Park; Attendance: 4,241; Referee: Rob Harvey

28 March 2025 7	Sligo Rovers	1–2	Shelbourne	Sligo
19:45 IST	Reece Hutchinson 45' Cian Kavanagh (red card)	Report	John Martin 3' Kerr McInroy 12'	Stadium: The Showgrounds; Attendance: 2,857; Referee: Paul Norton

4 April 2025 8	St.Patrick's Athletic	0–0	Shelbourne	Inchicore
19:45 IST		Report		Stadium: Richmond Park; Attendance: 5,374; Referee: Robert Hennessy

11 April 2025 9	Shelbourne	1–0	Bohemians	Drumcondra
19:45 IST	Mipo Odubeko 79'	Report		Stadium: Tolka Park; Attendance: 5,513; Referee: Kevin O'Sullivan

18 April 2025 10	Drogheda United	2–2	Shelbourne	Drogheda
19:45 IST	Davis 22'; Bone (o.g.)	Report	Coyle 29'; Bone 66'	Stadium: Weavers Park; Attendance: 2,531; Referee: Damien McGraith

21 April 2025 11	Shelbourne	2–2	Galway United	Drumcondra
17:00 GMT	Chapman 1'; Odubeko 67'	Report	Dyer 37', 81'	Stadium: Tolka Park; Attendance: 4,236; Referee: Paul Norton

25 April 2025 12	Shamrock Rovers	2–2	Shelbourne	Tallaght
19:45 IST	Healy 28'; Cleary 67'	Report	Ali Coote 50'; Odubeko 64'	Stadium: Tallaght Stadium; Attendance: 7,317; Referee: Paul McLaughlin

2 May 2025 13	Derry City	2–0	Shelbourne	Derry, Northern Ireland
19:45 IST	Duffy 14'; Boyce 31'	Report		Stadium: Ryan McBride Brandywell Stadium; Attendance: 3,356; Referee: Robert Hennessy

5 May 2025 14	Shelbourne	0–1	Waterford	Drumcondra
17:00 IST		Report	Amond 3'	Stadium: Tolka Park; Attendance: 3,973; Referee: Marc Lynch

9 May 2025 15	Shelbourne	2–1	St.Patrick's Athletic	Drumcondra
19:45 IST	Wood 48'; McInroy 90'	Report	Melia 29'	Stadium: Tolka Park; Attendance: 5,411; Referee: Kevin O'Sullivan

16 May 2025 16	Bohemians	1–0	Shelbourne	Phibsborough
19:45 GMT	Rooney 36'	Report	Coyle (red card) 35'; Coote (yellow card) 75' (yellow-red card) 84'	Stadium: Dalymount Park; Attendance: 4,392; Referee: Rob Harvey

19 May 2025 17	Shelbourne	0–0	Drogheda United	Drumcondra
19:45 IST		Report		Stadium: Tolka Park; Attendance: 3,539; Referee: Robert Hennessy
Note: Live on Virgin Media

23 May 2025 18	Shelbourne	3–2	Sligo Rovers	Drumcondra
19:45 IST	Martin 34', 40', 57'	Report	McElroy 3'; Elding 58'	Stadium: Tolka Park; Attendance: 4,008; Referee: Aaron O'Dowd

30 May 2025 19	Cork City	1–1	Shelbourne	Cork
19:45 IST	Maguire 57'	Report	Coote 71'	Stadium: Turners Cross; Attendance: 2,821; Referee: Marc Lynch

13 June 2025 20	Shelbourne	1–2	Shamrock Rovers	Drumcondra
19:45 IST	Honohan 32' (o.g.)	Report	Cleary 12'; Honohan 84'	Stadium: Tolka Park; Attendance: 5,633; Referee: Robert Harvey

16 June 2025 21	St. Patrick's Athletic	0-1	Shelbourne	Inchicore
19:45 IST		Report	Coote 10'	Stadium: Richmond Park; Attendance: 4,421; Referee: Paul Norton

20 June 2025 22	Shelbourne	0-1	Derry City	Drumcondra
19:45 IST		Report	Duffy 55'	Stadium: Tolka Park; Attendance: 3,890; Referee: Neil Doyle

23 June 2025 23	Waterford	2–2	Shelbourne	Waterford
19:45 IST	Horton 8'; Amond 48'	Report	Wood 3', 49'	Stadium: RSC; Attendance: 2,641

27 June 2025 24	Galway United	1–1	Shelbourne	Galway
19:45 GMT	Burns 84'	Report	Odubeko 25'	Stadium: Eamonn Deacy Park; Attendance: 2,351; Referee: Kevin O'Sullivan

4 July 2025 25	Shelbourne	3-1	Cork City	Drumcondra
19:45 IST	Wood 2'; Odubeko 6'; Lunney 83'	Report	Nelson 42'; Lyons (red card) 52'	Stadium: Tolka Park; Attendance: 4,034; Referee: Rob Harvey

2 August 2025 26	Sligo Rovers	0-2	Shelbourne	Sligo
19:45 IST	Sargeant (red card) 84'	Report	Coote 47'; Boyd 77'	Stadium: The Showgrounds; Attendance: 3,167; Referee: Rob Harvey

9 August 2025 27	Shelbourne	2-2	Bohemians	Drumcondra
19:45 IST	Kelly 4'; Martin 90'	Report	Parsons 11'; Temple 76' (o.g.)	Stadium: Tolka Park; Attendance: 5,474; Referee: Rob Hennessey

7 September 2025 28	Shelbourne	1–0	Galway United	Drumcondra
19:45 IST	Wood 78' (pen.)	Report		Stadium: Tolka Park; Attendance: 3,971; Referee: Neil Doyle

19 September 2025 29	Derry City	1-1	Shelbourne	Derry, Northern Ireland
19:45 IST	O'Reilly 40'	Report	Odubeko 54'	Stadium: Ryan McBride Brandywell Stadium; Referee: Paul McLaughlin

22 September 2025 30	Drogheda United	2–1	Shelbourne	Drogheda
19:45 IST	Kareem 26'; Caffrey 65' (o.g.)	Report	Wood 89'	Stadium: Weavers Park; Attendance: 2,350; Referee: Kevin O’Sullivan

26 September 2025 31	Shelbourne	2–1	Waterford	Drumcondra
19:45 IST	Coote 7'; Wood 79' (pen.)	Report	Noonan 43'	Stadium: Tolka Park; Attendance: 3,646; Referee: Marc Lynch

9 October 2025 32	Shamrock Rovers	0-1	Shelbourne	Tallaght
19:45 IST		Report	McInroy 33' Barrett (red card) 77'	Stadium: Tallaght Stadium; Attendance: 7,477; Referee: Rob Hennessey

13 October 2025 33	Cork City	1–2	Shelbourne	Cork
19:45 IST	Maguire 77'	Report	Kelly 3'; Henry-Francis 88'	Stadium: Turners Cross; Attendance: 1,611; Referee: Neil Doyle

17 October 2025 34	Shelbourne	3–1	Sligo Rovers	Drumcondra
19:45 IST	Odubeko 30'; Kelly 81'; Martin 91'	Report	Kavanagh 20'	Stadium: Tolka Park; Attendance: 4,284; Referee: Paul Norton

26 October 2025 35	Bohemians	2-3	Shelbourne	Phibsborough
16:00 GMT	Tierney 17'; Flores 22'	Report	Martin 35'; Wood 87'; McInroy 97'	Stadium: Dalymount Park; Referee: Rob Hennessy

1 November 2025 36	Shelbourne	0-0	St.Patrick's Athletic	Drumcondra
16:30 IST		Report		Stadium: Tolka Park; Attendance: 5,417; Referee: Rob Harvey

=== Leinster Senior Cup ===
14 January 2025	Shelbourne	0–3	Drogheda United	Clonshaugh, Dublin 9
19:45			Oluwa 4' 16' 39'	Stadium: AUL; Attendance: 478; Referee: Paul Norton

29 January 2025	St Mochta's	3–2	Shelbourne	Kilbarrack, Dublin 5
20:15	Karl Somers 59'; Michael Scott 61'; Tyler Doherty 84'		James Bailey 31'; James Bailey 63'	Stadium: Kilbarrack United; Referee: David Gallagher

4 February 2025	Shelbourne	2–1	Longford Town	Clonshaugh, Dublin 9
19:40	Tyreik Sammy 40'; Tyreik Sammy 53'		James Roche 18' (o.g.)	Stadium: AUL; Referee: Aaron O'Dowd

[Note] Club's U20 team competed in the Leinster Senior Cup

=== FAI Cup ===
19 July 2025 Second round	Fairview Rangers	0-4	Shelbourne	Garryowen, County Limerick
18:00 IST			Martin 4', 72', 86', Kelly 24'	Stadium: Fairgreen; Attendance: 950; Referee: Marc Lynch

17 August 2025 Third round	St. Patrick's Athletic	2-0	Shelbourne	Inchicore
17:00 IST	Melia 45+4'; Forrester 54' (pen.)			Stadium: Richmond Park; Attendance: 3,003; Referee: Paul McLaughlin

=== UEFA Champions League ===
==== First Qualifying Round ====
9 July 2025 First leg	Shelbourne (Republic of Ireland)	1–0	(Northern Ireland) Linfield	Drumcondra
19:45 IST	Odubeko 58'	Report		Stadium: Tolka Park; Attendance: 3,600; Referee: Luis Godinho

16 July 2025 Second leg	Linfield (Northern Ireland)	1-1 (1–2 agg.)	(Republic of Ireland) Shelbourne	Belfast
19.45 IST	Shields 45+3' (pen.) Hall (red card) 64'	Report	Coote 25'	Stadium: Windsor Park; Attendance: 7,137; Referee: Andrew Madley

==== Second Qualifying Round ====
23 July 2025 First leg	Shelbourne (Republic of Ireland)	0-3	(Azerbaijan) Qarabağ	Drumcondra
19:45 IST			Andrade 12', Kaschuk 80', Akhundzade 84'	Stadium: Tolka Park; Attendance: 3,650; Referee: Ante Cullina

30 July 2025 Second leg	Qarabağ (Azerbaijan)	1-0 (4-0 agg.)	(Republic of Ireland) Shelbourne	Baku
17.00 IST	Martin 44' (o.g.)	Report		Stadium: Azersun Arena; Attendance: 25,573; Referee: Andrea Colombo

=== UEFA Europa League ===
==== Third Qualifying Round ====
6 August 2025 First leg	Rijeka (Croatia)	1-2	(Republic of Ireland) Shelbourne	Rijeka
19:45 IST	Jankovic 56' (pen.)	Report	Bone 58', Martin 70'	Stadium: Stadion Rujevica; Attendance: 6,495; Referee: Ricardo de Burgos

12 August 2025 Second leg	Shelbourne (Republic of Ireland)	1-3 (3-4 agg.)	(Croatia) Rijeka	Drumcondra
19.45 IST	Odubeko 86' (pen.)	Report	Fruk 33', Tiago Dantas 72', Oreč 89'	Stadium: Tolka Park; Attendance: 3,650; Referee: Marian Bardu

=== UEFA Conference League ===
==== Play-off Round ====
21 August 2025 First leg	Shelbourne (Republic of Ireland)	3-1	(Northern Ireland) Linfield	Drumcondra
19:45 IST	Wood 45' (pen.) Odubeko 46' Caffrey 76'	Report	Fitzpatrick (red card) 19' Offord 53'	Stadium: Tolka Park; Attendance: 3,655; Referee: Vassilis Fotias

28 August 2025 Second leg	Linfield (Northern Ireland)	0-2 (1-5 agg.)	(Republic of Ireland) Shelbourne	Belfast
19:45 IST		Report	Wood 23' Coote 30'	Stadium: Windsor Park; Attendance: 5,200; Referee: Julian Weinberger

==== League Phase ====
Shelbourne played six games in the League phase of the Conference League, three home and three away, with one team from each pot (seed) from the draw. Shelbourne were in Pot 6 as they had the lowest coefficient points of any team to qualify for this stage of the competition.

Shelbourne played their home games in the League Phase at Tallaght Stadium as Tolka Park did not meet the standards for UEFA competitions.

Pos	Team	Pld	W	D	L	GF	GA	GD	Pts
32	(Swedish Football Association) BK Häcken	6	0	3	3	5	8	−3	3
33	(Malta Football Association) Hamrun Spartans	6	1	0	5	4	11	−7	3
34	(Football Association of Ireland) Shelbourne	6	0	2	4	0	7	−7	2
35	(Scottish Football Association) Aberdeen	6	0	2	4	3	14	−11	2
36	(Austrian Football Association) Rapid Wien	6	0	1	5	3	14	−11	1

Source: UEFA
Rules for classification: League phase tiebreakers

Round	1	2	3	4	5	6
Ground	H	A	H	A	H	A
Result	D	L	L	L	L	D
Position	19	27	30	34	34	34
Points	1	1	1	1	1	2

Source: UEFA
A = Away; H = Home; W = Win; D = Draw; L = Loss

2 October 2025	Shelbourne (Republic of Ireland)	0–0	(Sweden) BK Häcken	Tallaght
20:00 IST		Report		Stadium: Tallaght Stadium; Attendance: 5,675; Referee: Paweł Raczkowski (Poland)

23 October 2025	Shkëndija (North Macedonia)	1-0	(Republic of Ireland) Shelbourne	Skopje, North Macedonia
17:45 IST	Barrett 90+1' (o.g.)	Report		Stadium: Toše Proeski Arena; Attendance: 2,051; Referee: Stefan Ebner (Austria)

6 November 2025	Shelbourne (Republic of Ireland)	0-1	(Kosovo) Drita	Tallaght
20:00 IST	Norris (red card) 16'	Report	Ajzeraj 57'	Stadium: Tallaght Stadium; Attendance: 4,503; Referee: Oliver Reitala (Finland)

27 November 2025	AZ Alkmaar (Netherlands)	2-0	(Republic of Ireland) Shelbourne	Alkmaar, Netherlands
17:45 IST	de Wit 70'; Jensen 86'	Report		Stadium: AFAS Stadion; Attendance: 15,210; Referee: Michal Ocenas (Slovakia)

11 December 2025	Shelbourne (Republic of Ireland)	0-3	(England) Crystal Palace	Tallaght
20:00 IST		Report	Uche 11'; Nketiah 25'; Pino 37'	Stadium: Tallaght Stadium; Attendance: 10,143; Referee: Martin Matosa (Slovenia)

18 December 2025	Celje (Slovenia)	0-0	(Republic of Ireland) Shelbourne	Celje, Slovenia
20:00 IST		Report		Stadium: Stadion Z'dežele; Attendance: 5,240; Referee: Sandi Putros (Denmark)

== Statistics ==
=== Appearances and goals ===
No.	Pos	Nat	Player	Total		Premier Division		FAI Cup		European Competitions		Other^{1}	
No.	Pos	Nat	Player	Apps	Goals	Apps	Goals	Apps	Goals	Apps	Goals	Apps	Goals
1	GK	(Republic of Ireland) IRL	Conor Kearns	27	0	23	0	1	0	2	0	1	0
2	DF	(Republic of Ireland) IRL	Sean Gannon	35	0	16+8	0	1	0	4+5	0	1	0
3	DF	(Republic of Ireland) IRL	Tyreke Wilson	17	0	8+5	0	0	0	2+2	0	0	0
4	DF	(Republic of Ireland) IRL	Kameron Ledwidge	49	0	31+3	0	1	0	11+2	0	1	0
5	MF	(England) ENG	Ellis Chapman	35	1	16+11	1	1	0	1+5	0	0+1	0
6	MF	(Republic of Ireland) IRL	Jonathan Lunney	50	1	28+7	1	1	0	11+2	0	0+1	0
7	MF	(England) ENG	Harry Wood	52	11	30+6	9	1	0	13+1	2	1	0
8	MF	(Republic of Ireland) IRL	Mark Coyle	43	1	23+5	1	1	0	9+4	0	1	0
9	FW	(Republic of Ireland) IRL	Seán Boyd	34	4	10+13	3	1	0	3+6	0	1	1
10	FW	(Republic of Ireland) IRL	John Martin	48	11	13+20	7	2	3	3+10	1	0	0
11	FW	(Republic of Ireland) IRL	Mipo Odubeko	48	12	24+9	8	0+1	0	13	3	1	1
13	GK	(Netherlands) NED	Wessel Speel	22	0	11	0	0	0	11	0	0	0
14	MF	(Scotland) SCO	Ali Coote	43	6	15+17	5	1	0	5+4	1	1	0
15	DF	(England) ENG	Sam Bone	22	2	14+1	1	1	0	5	1	1	0
16	MF	(Republic of Ireland) IRL	John O'Sullivan	15	0	3+10	0	1	0	0+1	0	0	0
17	FW	(Republic of Ireland) IRL	Daniel Kelly	33	4	6+13	3	1+1	1	4+8	0	0	0
18	DF	(England) ENG	James Norris	45	0	24+8	0	1+1	0	9+2	0	0	0
19	GK	(Republic of Ireland) IRL	Lorcan Healy	7	0	2+1	0	1+1	0	1+1	0	0	0
21	MF	(Republic of Ireland) IRL	Jack-Henry-Francis	14	1	5+3	1	0	0	5+1	0	0	0
22	MF	(Republic of Ireland) IRL	Sean Moore	2	0	1+1	0	0	0	0	0	0	0
23	MF	(Scotland) SCO	Kerr McInroy	50	4	29+5	4	0+1	0	14	0	1	0
24	DF	(Republic of Ireland) IRL	Lewis Temple	17	0	9+2	0	2	0	1+3	0	0	0
25	DF	(France) FRA	Milan Mbeng	21	0	9+1	0	1	0	10	0	0	0
27	MF	(Republic of Ireland) IRL	Evan Caffrey	49	4	28+6	3	1	0	4+9	1	0+1	0
29	DF	(Republic of Ireland) IRL	Paddy Barrett	34	0	19+1	0	0	0	13	0	1	0
44	FW	(Republic of Ireland) IRL	Dan Ring	1	0	0	0	0+1	0	0	0	0	0
46	MF	(Republic of Ireland) IRL	Aaron Maloney	1	0	0	0	1	0	0	0	0	0
47	MF	(Republic of Ireland) IRL	James Bailey	1	0	0	0	0+1	0	0	0	0	0
49	DF	(Republic of Ireland) IRL	Raymond Offor	1	0	0	0	0+1	0	0	0	0	0
55	DF	(Republic of Ireland) IRL	James Roche	2	0	0+1	0	1	0	0	0	0	0
60	MF	(Republic of Ireland) IRL	Cillian Ryan	1	0	0	0	0+1	0	0	0	0	0
53	DF	(Republic of Ireland) IRL	Derinsola Adewale	1	0	0	0	0+1	0	0	0	0	0
77	FW	(Republic of Ireland) IRL	Rayhaan Tulloch	4	0	0+3	0	0	0	0	0	0+1	0
28	MF	(Republic of Ireland) IRL	Ryan O'Kane	5	0	0+5	0	0	0	0	0	0	0

^{1} Includes 2024–25 Leinster Senior Cup and the 2025 President of Ireland's Cup.

Players listed in italics left the club mid-season.

=== Goalscorers ===
Rank	No.	Pos.	Nat.	Player	Premier Division	FAI Cup	European Competitions	Other^{1}	Total
1	11	FW	(Republic of Ireland)	Mipo Odubeko	8	0	3	1	12
2	7	MF	(England)	Harry Wood	9	0	2	0	11
2	10	FW	(Republic of Ireland)	John Martin	7	3	1	0	11
3	14	MF	(Scotland)	Ali Coote	5	0	2	0	7
4	27	MF	(Republic of Ireland)	Evan Caffrey	3	0	1	0	4
4	23	MF	(Scotland)	Kerr McInroy	4	0	0	0	4
4	9	FW	(Republic of Ireland)	Seán Boyd	3	0	0	1	4
4	17	FW	(Republic of Ireland)	Daniel Kelly	3	1	0	0	4
5	15	DF	(England)	Sam Bone	1	0	1	0	2
6	8	MF	(Republic of Ireland)	Mark Coyle	1	0	0	0	1
6	6	MF	(Republic of Ireland)	JJ Lunney	1	0	0	0	1
6	5	MF	(England)	Ellis Chapman	1	0	0	0	1
6	21	MF	(Republic of Ireland)	Jack Henry-Francis	1	0	0	0	1
n/a				Own Goals	1	0	0	0	1
Total					47	4	10	2	64

^{1} Includes 2024–25 Leinster Senior Cup and the 2025 President of Ireland's Cup.
