= John Martin (footballer, born 1999) =

Irish footballer (born 1999)

Personal information
- Date of birth: 5 January 1999 (age 27)
- Place of birth: Paulstown, County Kilkenny, Ireland
- Position: Forward

Team information
- Current team: Shelbourne
- Number: 10

Youth career
- Vale Wanderers
- New Oak
- Belvedere
- Shelbourne
- 2015–2016: St Patrick's Athletic
- 2017: Waterford

Senior career*
Years	Team	Apps	(Gls)
2017–2021	Waterford	78	(20)
2019	→ Bray Wanderers (loan)	7	(2)
2022–2023	Dundalk	63	(8)
2024–	Shelbourne	84	(19)

International career
2016	Republic of Ireland U17	1	(0)
2017	Republic of Ireland U18	3	(0)
2017	Republic of Ireland U19	2	(0)
- * Club domestic league appearances and goals as of 19:26, 10 November 2026 (UTC)

John Martin is an Irish professional footballer who plays as a forward for League of Ireland Premier Division club Shelbourne.

== Career ==
=== Early career ===
Martin was born on 5 January 1999 in Paulstown, Ireland. His first club was Vale Wanderers in Leighlinbridge, before he moved to New Oak in Carlow. He subsequently played youth football with Belvedere, Shelbourne, St Patrick's Athletic, and Waterford.

=== Waterford and Bray Wanderers ===
Martin's senior career began at Waterford in the 2017 League of Ireland First Division. He made his professional debut at home to Longford Town in May 2017. The club were promoted at the end of that season, and he played the following 4 seasons with the club in the Premier Division. He spent the second half of the 2019 season on loan at Bray Wanderers back in the First Division.

=== Dundalk ===
In 2022, Martin joined Premier Division side Dundalk. His first goal for the club was a late winner against Shelbourne in the league. During his tenure at Dundalk, he made 73 appearances and scored 10 goals.

=== Shelbourne ===
In December 2023, Martin signed for Shelbourne. Manager Damien Duff praised Martin for his "hunger to score goals and win games" and noted that his versatility — capable of playing both as a centre‐forward and on the wing — made him a perfect fit for the team's style of play. After the club won the 2024 League of Ireland Premier Division title, Duff praised Martin's contribution and, in particular, his mentality and workrate. On 7 August 2025, Martin scored the winning goal to complete a 2–1 away win over Croatian side Rijeka in the Europa League third qualifying round.

== International career ==
Martin has represented the Republic of Ireland at U17, U18, and U19 level.

== Personal life ==
Martin has a twin brother, Paul, who is also a professional footballer and is who plays for Wexford. They played together at Waterford and for the Republic of Ireland U17 in a friendly against Switzerland U17 in March 2016. They have also faced each other in an FAI Cup tie in 2022, with Paul's Waterford side gaining victory over John's Dundalk.

== Career statistics ==
As of match played on 30 October 2026

Appearances and goals by club, season and competition
Club	Season	League			National Cup (Note: Includes FAI Cup)		League Cup (Note: Includes League of Ireland Cup)		Europe		Other		Total	
Club	Season	Division	Apps	Goals	Apps	Goals	Apps	Goals	Apps	Goals	Apps	Goals	Apps	Goals
Waterford	2017	LOI First Division	15	4	1	0	0	0	–		0 (Note: Appearance(s) in the Leinster Senior Cup)	0	16	4
Waterford	2018	LOI Premier Division	14	2	0	0	3	1	–		0	0	17	3
Waterford	2019	LOI Premier Division	7	0	–		1	0	–		1	1	9	1
Waterford	2020	LOI Premier Division	11	4	1	0	–		–		–		12	4
Waterford	2021	LOI Premier Division	31	10	4	2	–		–		1 (Note: Appearance in the 2021 League of Ireland Premier Division Promotion/Relegation Play-off)	0	36	12
Waterford	Total		78	20	6	2	4	1	–		2	1	90	24
Bray Wanderers (loan)	2019	LOI First Division	7	2	1	0	—		—		—		8	2
Dundalk	2022	LOI Premier Division	31	2	3	0	–		–		–		34	2
Dundalk	2023	LOI Premier Division	32	6	2	0	–		4 (Note: Appearances in the UEFA Europa Conference League)	2	1 (Note: Appearance(s) in the Leinster Senior Cup)	0	39	8
Dundalk	Total		63	8	5	0	–		4	2	1	0	73	10
Shelbourne	2024	LOI Premier Division	30	4	2	0	–		3 (Note: Appearance(s) in the UEFA Conference League)	0	0	0	35	4
Shelbourne	2025	LOI Premier Division	33	7	2	3	—		13 (Note: 3 appearances in the UEFA Champions League; 2 appearances, 1 goal in the UEFA Europa League; 8 appearances in the UEFA Conference League)	1	0 (Note: Appearance in the President of Ireland's Cup)	0	48	11
Shelbourne	2026	LOI Premier Division	21	8	0	0	—		0	0	0	0	21	8
Shelbourne	Total		84	19	4	3	–		16	1	0	0	104	23
Career total			232	49	16	5	4	1	20	3	3	1	275	59

== Honours ==
Waterford

- League of Ireland First Division: 2017

Shelbourne

- League of Ireland Premier Division: 2024
- President of Ireland's Cup: 2025
