= 2026 Shelbourne F.C. season (Men's) =

Irish football club season

Shelbourne
2026 season
- CEO: Tomás Quinn
- Head Coach: Joey O'Brien (sacked 25 June 2026) Lorcan Fitzgerald (interim 25 June - 12 July) John Russell
- Stadium: Tolka Park, Dublin
- Premier Division: 2026 League of Ireland Premier Division
- Leinster Senior Cup: 2025-26 Leinster Senior Cup
- FAI Cup: Second round
- UEFA Conference League: Second qualifying round
- Top goalscorer: League: Harry Wood 10; All: Daniel Kelly 12
- Highest home attendance: Celtic 6,572; 7 July 2026 (Friendly)
- Lowest home attendance: Nõmme Kalju 3,357; 23 July 2026 (UEFA Conference League)
Home colours	Away colours	Third colours
- All statistics correct as of 29 Dec 2025.

The 2026 Shelbourne F.C. season is the club's 131st season in existence and sees the Men's Senior Team competing in the 2026 League of Ireland Premier Division.

Having finished third in the 2025 League of Ireland Premier Division, the club entered the 2026-27 UEFA Conference League at the second qualifying round.

On 4 November 2025, Chadwick's confirmed the extension of their partnership of Shelbourne FC for a further two years, continuing as the club's front of jersey sponsor.

Following the departure of Mark Coyle to Coleraine, defender Paddy Barrett was appointed as team captain.

On 14 January 2026, Shels broke the League of Ireland record transfer fee by signing defender Odhrán Casey from Cliftonville.

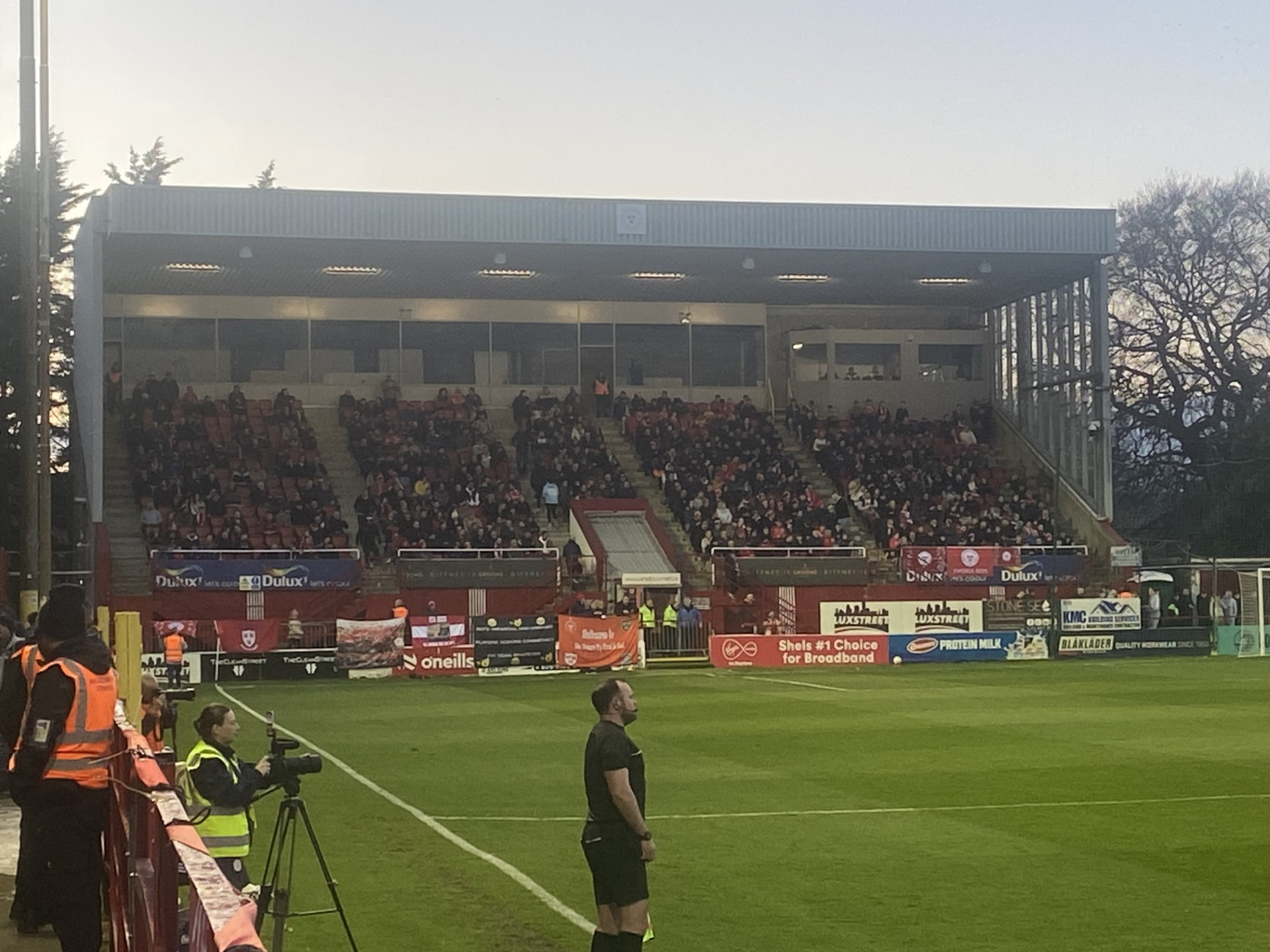
Reopened Drumcondra Stand, Shelbourne v Dundalk 3 April 2026

The Drumcondra Stand at Tolka Park, which had been closed for a number of years, reopened for a League of Ireland match versus Dundalk on 3 April.

On 25 June 2026, Joey O'Brien departed as head coach. Lorcan Fitzgerald took interim charge of the team. On 13 July, John Russell as confirmed as the new head coach.

== First team squad ==
Players' ages are as of the opening day of the 2026 season. Players in italics departed the club during the 2026 season.

#	Name	Nationality	Position	Date of birth (age)	Previous club	Debut	Notes
Goalkeepers
1	Wessel Speel	(Netherlands)	GK	17 October 2001 (aged 23)	Minnesota United FC	2025	Season-Long Loan
31	Conor Walsh	(Republic of Ireland)	GK	7 March 2005 (aged 21)	Sligo Rovers F.C.	2026	
50	Ali Topcu	(Republic of Ireland)	GK	1 April 2008 (aged 17)	Youth Team	2024	Youth
73	Finn Moylan	(Republic of Ireland)	GK	3 February 2008 (aged 18)	Youth Team	2025	Youth
19	Eddie Beach	(Wales)	GK	9 October 2003 (aged 22)	Kilmarnock F.C.	2026	
13	Murray Johnson	(Scotland)	GK	13 November 2004 (aged 21)	Hibernian F.C.	2026	Loan
Defenders
2	Sean Gannon	(Republic of Ireland)	DF	11 July 1991 (aged 34)	Shamrock Rovers	2024	
4	Kameron Ledwidge	(Republic of Ireland)	DF	7 April 2001 (aged 24)	Southampton	2021	
15	Sam Bone	(England)	DF	6 February 1998 (aged 27)	Maidstone United	2024	
16	Odhrán Casey	(Northern Ireland)	DF	9 April 2002 (aged 23)	Cliftonville F.C.	2026	
18	James Norris	(England)	DF	4 April 2003 (aged 21)	Liverpool F.C.	2026	
24	Zeno Ibsen Rossi	(England)	DF	28 October 2000 (aged 25)	Cambridge United F.C.	2026	Loan expired July 2026
25	Milan Mbeng	(France)	DF	6 April 2002 (aged 23)	Cork City F.C.	2025	
29	Paddy Barrett	(Republic of Ireland)	DF	22 July 1993 (aged 32)	St Patrick's Athletic	2023	Captain
55	James Roche	(Republic of Ireland)	DF	October 2007 (aged 17)	Shamrock Rovers	2025	Youth
	Marco Untergrabner	(Austria)	DF	2 November 2001 (aged 24)	Floridsdorfer AC	2026	
Midfielders
5	Ellis Chapman	(England)	MF	8 January 2001 (aged 25)	Sligo Rovers F.C.	2025	transferred to Derry City F.C. July 2026
6	Jonathan Lunney	(Republic of Ireland)	MF	2 February 1998 (aged 27)	Bohemians	2021	
7	Harry Wood	(England)	MF	2 August 2002 (aged 23)	Hull City	2024	transferred to Stockport County July 2026
14	Ali Coote	(Scotland)	MF	11 June 1998 (aged 28)	Detroit City	2024	
17	Daniel Kelly	(Republic of Ireland)	MF	21 May 1996 (aged 29)	Derry City	2025	
21	Jack Henry-Francis	(Republic of Ireland)	MF	23 September 2003 (aged 22)	Arsenal F.C.	2025	
22	Sean Moore	(Republic of Ireland)	MF	3 August 2005 (aged 20)	West Ham United F.C.	2025	
23	Kerr McInroy	(Scotland)	MF	31 August 2000 (aged 25)	Free Agent	2025	
27	Evan Caffrey	(Republic of Ireland)	MF	27 February 2003 (aged 22)	UCD	2023	
28	Maill Lundgren	(Eritrea)	MF	1 June 2001 (aged 24)	Degerfors IF	2026	
47	James Bailey	(Republic of Ireland)	MF	13 August 2007 (aged 18)	Youth Team	2025	Youth
52	Alex Flynn	(Republic of Ireland)	MF	19 July 2008 (aged 17)	Youth Team	2025	Youth
60	Cillian Ryan	(Republic of Ireland)	MF	5 March 2008 (aged 17)	Youth Team	2025	Youth
Attackers
9	Seán Boyd	(Republic of Ireland)	FW	20 June 1998 (aged 27)	Finn Harps	2022	
10	John Martin	(Republic of Ireland)	FW	13 March 1997 (aged 28)	Dundalk	2024	
11	Mipo Odubeko	(Republic of Ireland)	FW	21 October 2002 (aged 23)	Fleetwood Town F.C.	2025	
20	Rodrigo Freitas	(Portugal)	FW	28 April 2002 (aged 23)	Varzim S.C.	2026	
36	Will Jarvis	(England)	FW	17 December 2002 (aged 23)	Notts County F.C.	2026	
44	Daniel Ring	(Republic of Ireland)	FW	3 February 2007 (aged 19)	Youth Team	2024	Youth
56	Joey Wuna	(Republic of Ireland)	FW	19 August 2009 (aged 16)	Youth Team	2025	Youth

== Transfers ==
=== Transfers in ===
Date	Position	Nationality	Name	Previous club	Ref.
23 December 2025	MF	(Eritrea)	Maill Lundgren	Degerfors IF	
23 December 2025	GK	(Republic of Ireland)	Conor Walsh	Sligo Rovers	
1st January 2026	DF	(England)	James Norris	Liverpool F.C.	
14 January 2026	DF	(Northern Ireland)	Odhrán Casey	Cliftonville F.C.	
19 January 2026	FW	(Portugal)	Rodrigo Freitas	Varzim S.C.	
5 February 2026	FW	(England)	Will Jarvis	Notts County F.C.	
20 July 2026	GK	(Wales)	Eddie Beach	Kilmarnock F.C.	
29 August 2026	DF	(Austria)	Marco Untergrabner	Floridsdorfer AC	

Loans In

Date	Until	Position	Nationality	Name	Previous club	Ref.
10 January 2026	end of season	GK	(Netherlands)	Wessel Speel	Minnesota United FC	
22 February 2026	1 July 2026	DF	(England)	Zeno Ibsen Rossi	Cambridge United F.C.	
22 July 2026	end of season	GK	(Scotland)	Murray Johnson	Hibernian F.C.	

=== Transfers out ===
Date	Position	Nationality	Name	To	Ref.
13 December 2025	MF	(Republic of Ireland)	Ryan O'Kane	Sligo Rovers	
22 December 2025	MF	(Republic of Ireland)	John O'Sullivan	Contract expired	
22 December 2025	GK	(Republic of Ireland)	Lorcan Healy	Contract expired	
6 January 2026	DF	(Republic of Ireland)	Lewis Temple	Bolton Wanderers F.C.	
8 January 2026	MF	(Republic of Ireland)	Mark Coyle	Coleraine F.C.	
3 February 2026	DF	(Republic of Ireland)	Raymond Offor	Derby County F.C.	
12 February 2026	DF	(Republic of Ireland)	Tyreke Wilson	Dundalk F.C.	
3 July 2026	MF	(England)	Ellis Chapman	Derry City F.C.	
16 July 2026	MF	(England)	Harry Wood	Stockport County F.C.	

Loans Out

Date	Position	Nationality	Name	To	Ref.
22 December 2025	MF	(Republic of Ireland)	Aaron Maloney	Athlone Town	
1 January 2026	GK	(Republic of Ireland)	Conor Kearns	Dundalk	
5 January 2026	FW	(Republic of Ireland)	Tyreik Sammy	Bray Wanderers F.C.	
11 December 2026	DF	(Republic of Ireland)	Derinsole Adewale	Athlone Town A.F.C.	
6 January 2026	DF	(Republic of Ireland)	Taylor McCarthy	Longford Town F.C.	
30 January 2026	DF	(Republic of Ireland)	James Roche	Athlone Town	(Note: James Roche was recalled from loan on 22 February 2026)
30 January 2026	FW	(Republic of Ireland)	Daniel Ring	Bray Wanderers F.C.	(Note: Daniel Ring was recalled from loan on 15 July 2026)
21 July 2026	MF	(Eritrea)	Maill Lundgren	Ranheim IL	

== Competitions ==
=== League of Ireland ===
Pos	Team	Pld	W	D	L	GF	GA	GD	Pts	Qualification or relegation
2	Bohemians	36	19	8	9	63	44	+19	65	Qualification for Conference League second qualifying round
3	St Patrick's Athletic	36	17	9	10	55	31	+24	60	Qualification for Conference League first qualifying round
4	Shelbourne	36	12	13	11	52	50	+2	49	
5	Derry City	36	11	15	10	50	47	+3	48	
6	Dundalk	36	11	12	13	55	59	−4	45	

Source: League of Ireland
Rules for classification: 1) Points; 2) Goal difference; 3) Goals scored.

6 February 2026 1	Waterford	1-1	Shelbourne	Waterford
19:45 IST	Lonergan 55'	Report	Martin 13'	Stadium: RSC; Attendance: 3,232; Referee: Lucas Keating

20 February 2026 2	Shelbourne	1-1	Galway United	Drumcondra
19:45 IST	Wood 64' (pen.)	Report	Twardek 62'	Stadium: Tolka Park; Attendance: 4,052; Referee: Kevin O'Sullivan

27 February 2026 3	Drogheda United	1-2	Shelbourne	Drogheda
19:45 IST	Kavanagh 5'	Report	Bone 47'; Wood 64' (pen.)	Stadium: Sullivan & Lambe Park; Attendance: 2,520; Referee: Rob Harvey

6 March 2026 4	Shelbourne	2-3	St.Patrick's Athletic	Drumcondra
19:45 IST	Wood 72', Martin 75'	Report	Edmondson 56', 61'; Mata 92'	Stadium: Tolka Park; Attendance: 5,090; Referee: Paul Norton

9 March 2026 5	Shelbourne	2-2	Shamrock Rovers	Drumcondra
19:45 IST	Wood 8', Martin 13'	Report	McGovern 26', Watts 33' (pen.)	Stadium: Tolka Park; Attendance: 5,683; Referee: Rob Hennessey
Note: Fixture was originally scheduled for 13 February, but was postponed following a pitch inspection at Tolka Park

13 March 2026 6	Derry City	1-2	Shelbourne	Derry, Northern Ireland
19:45 IST	Rylah 10'	Report	Henry-Francis 8', Kelly 34'	Stadium: Ryan McBride Brandywell Stadium; Attendance: 2,974; Referee: Neil Doyle

16 March 2026 7	Shelbourne	0-0	Bohemians	Drumcondra
19:45 IST		Report		Stadium: Tolka Park; Attendance: 5,650; Referee: Aaron O'Dowd

21 March 2026 8	Sligo Rovers	0-1	Shelbourne	Sligo
19:45 IST		Report	Kelly 63'	Stadium: The Showgrounds; Attendance: 2,878; Referee: Paul Norton

3 April 2026 9	Shelbourne	2-3	Dundalk	Drumcondra
19:45 IST	Rossi 60', Martin 68'		Arubi 11', Burns 23', Rossi 86' (o.g.)	Stadium: Tolka Park; Attendance: 4,674; Referee: Lucas Keating

6 April 2026 10	Shamrock Rovers	3-2	Shelbourne	Tallaght
19:45 IST	Lopes 44', Noonan 45+1', Burke 57'		Coote 32', Jack Henry-Francis 78'	Stadium: Tallaght Stadium; Attendance: 5,808; Referee: Kevin O’Sullivan

17 April 2026 11	Shelbourne	1-2	Derry City	Drumcondra
19:45 IST	Martin 50'		Cotter 20', Akinyemi 68'	Stadium: Tolka Park; Attendance: 3,625; Referee: Aaron O'Dowd

24 April 2026 12	Shelbourne	3-4	Drogheda United	Drumcondra
19:45 IST	Boyd 19', Barrett 42', Wood 80' (pen.)		Agbaje 51', Davis 62', 67', Keeley 86',	Stadium: Tolka Park; Attendance: 4,577; Referee: Marc Lynch

1 May 2026 13	Dundalk	1-2	Shelbourne	Dundalk
19:45 IST	Horgan 89' (pen.)		Kelly 11', McInroy 53'	Stadium: Oriel Park; Attendance: 3,149; Referee: Paul Norton

4 May 2026 14	Bohemians	2-2	Shelbourne	Phibsborough
19:45 IST	McDonnell 10', Vaughan 88'	Report	Martin 16', Wood 72'	Stadium: Dalymount Park; Attendance: 4,015; Referee: Neil Doyle

8 May 2026 15	Shelbourne	0-0	Sligo Rovers	Drumcondra
19:45 IST		Report		Stadium: Tolka Park; Attendance: 3,610; Referee: Oliver Moran

15 May 2026 16	St.Patrick's Athletic	0-1	Shelbourne	Inchicore
19:45 IST			Kelly 82'	Stadium: Richmond Park; Attendance: 5,041

22 May 2026 17	Shelbourne	2-1	Waterford United	Drumcondra
19:45 IST	Jarvis 37', Boyd 92'	Report	Amond 39'	Stadium: Tolka Park; Attendance: 3,815; Referee: Arnold Hunter

25 May 2026 18	Derry City	0-0	Shelbourne	Derry
19:45 IST		Report		Stadium: Celtic Park; Attendance: 2,850; Referee: Marc Lynch

29 May 2026 19	Shelbourne	1-1	Galway United	Drumcondra
19:45 IST	Wood 57'	Report	Pierrot 65'	Stadium: Tolka Park; Attendance: 3,917; Referee: Paul McLaughlin

12 June 2026 20	Shelbourne	2-1	Shamrock Rovers	Drumcondra
19:45 IST	Caffrey 31', Odubeko 65'	Report	Brennan 55'	Stadium: Tolka Park; Attendance: 5,515; Referee: Rob Harvey

19 June 2026 21	Drogheda United	2-2	Shelbourne	Drogheda
19:45 IST	Oluwa 24', Doyle 36'	Report	Wood 15', 64'	Stadium: Sullivan & Lambe Park; Attendance: 2,141; Referee: Arnold Hunter

22 June 2026 22	Shelbourne	0-3	Bohemians	Drumcondra
19:45 IST	Boyd (red card)	Report	Vaughan 1', Whelan 29', Tierney 82'	Stadium: Tolka Park; Attendance: 5,329; Referee: Kevin O'Sullivan

27 June 2026 23	Sligo Rovers	2-2	Shelbourne	Sligo
19:45 IST	Traore 27', Patton 56'	Report	Coote 81', Barrett 95'	Stadium: The Showgrounds; Attendance: 2,089; Referee: Rob Hennessy

3 July 2026 24	Shelbourne	2-1	Dundalk	Drumcondra
19:45 IST	Kelly 38' Wood 41'	Report	JR Wilson 4'	Stadium: Tolka Park; Attendance: 4,032; Referee: Aaron O'Dowd

2 Aug 2026 25	Waterford	1-0	Shelbourne	Waterford
15:00 IST	Lonergan 48'	Report		Stadium: RSC; Attendance: 1,977; Referee: Lucas Keating

9 Aug 2026 26	Shelbourne	1-2	St.Patrick's Athletic	Drumcondra
17:00 IST	Norris 70', Freitas (red card)	Report	Olusanya 7'; Brown 34'	Stadium: Tolka Park; Attendance: 4,511; Referee: Paul Norton

28 Aug 2026 27	Galway United	1-1	Shelbourne	Galway
19:45 IST	Keohane 94'	Report	Kelly 80'	Stadium: Eamonn Deacy Park; Attendance: 1,977; Referee: Aaron O'Dowd

4 September 2026 28	Shamrock Rovers	0-0	Shelbourne	Tallaght
19:45 IST		Report		Stadium: Tallaght Stadium; Attendance: 7,251; Referee: Kevin O’Sullivan

11 September 2026 29	Shelbourne	0-1	Derry City	Drumcondra
19:45 IST		Report	Duffy 93'	Stadium: Tolka Park; Attendance: 3,762

14 September 2026 30	Shelbourne	1-2	Drogheda United	Drumcondra
19:45 IST	Kelly 22'	Report	Davis 40' Burney 57'	Stadium: Tolka Park; Attendance: 3,866

18 September 2026 31	Dundalk	2-3	Shelbourne	Dundalk
19:45 IST	Teahan 12'; McDaid 71' Tracy (red card)		Moore 39', Boyd 80', 90'	Stadium: Oriel Park; Attendance: 2,641; Referee: Kevin O'Sullivan

25 Sep 2026 32	Galway United	1-1	Shelbourne	Galway
19:45 IST	Keohane 50' (pen.)	Report	Mipo 58'	Stadium: Eamonn Deacy Park; Attendance: 2,431; Referee: Rob Hennessy

9 October 2026 33	Shelbourne	5-1	Sligo Rovers	Drumcondra
19:45 IST	Kelly 11' Mipo 50' Martin 52', 59' Mbeng 57'	Report	Woolery 46'	Stadium: Tolka Park; Attendance: 5,684; Referee: Paul McLaughlin

16 October 2026 34	St.Patrick's Athletic	1-2	Shelbourne	Inchicore
19:45 IST	Lennon 43'	Report	Moore 49' Kelly 85' Coote (red card)	Stadium: Richmond Park; Attendance: 5,041

23 October 2026 35	Bohemians	0-1	Shelbourne	Phibsborough
19:45 IST		Report	Mipo 85'	Stadium: Dalymount Park; Attendance: 4,445; Referee: Rob Harvey

30 October 2026 36	Shelbourne	2-3	Waterford	Drumcondra
19:45 IST	McInroy 9' Lunney 69'	Report	McLaughlin 38' Amond 52' Lonergan 88'	Stadium: Tolka Park; Attendance: 4,699; Referee: Aaron O'Dowd

=== FAI Cup ===
17 July 2026 2nd round	Kerry	2–2 (a.e.t.) (6–5 p)	Shelbourne	Tralee, County Kerry
19:45	Sean O'Connell 77'; Cian Murphy 78'	Report	Odhrán Casey (yellow card) 52' (yellow-red card); Daniel Kelly 60'; Jack Henry-Francis 90+3'	Stadium: Mounthawk Park; Attendance: 1,164; Referee: Neil Doyle
	Penalties
	Cian Murphy (penalty missed); Matthew Britton (penalty missed); Sean McGrath (penalty scored); Sean O'Connell (penalty scored); Colin Healy (penalty scored); Ewan Lee (penalty scored); Niall Brookwell (penalty scored); Vincent Borden (penalty scored)		Paddy Barrett (penalty scored); Sam Bone (penalty scored); Sean Moore (penalty scored); James Roche (penalty missed); Evan Caffrey (penalty missed); Daniel Kelly (penalty scored); Daniel Ring (penalty scored); Sean Gannon (penalty missed)

=== UEFA Conference League ===
==== Second Qualifying Round ====
23 July 2026 First leg	Shelbourne (Republic of Ireland)	5–2	(Estonia) Nõmme Kalju FC	Drumcondra, Dublin
	Freitas 3', Moore 21', 47' Coote 25' Ring 89'	Report	Esono 40', 91'	Stadium: Tolka Park; Attendance: 3,357; Referee: Szabolcs Kovacs (Romania)

30 July 2026 Second leg	(Estonia) Nõmme Kalju FC	2-1 (4-6 agg.)	Shelbourne (Republic of Ireland)	Parnu
	Musolitin (red card) 31' Esono 49', Jabir 75'	Report	Kelly 14'	Stadium: Pärnu Rannastaadion; Referee: Jóhan Hendrik Ellefsen (Faroe Islands)

==== Third Qualifying Round ====
2 August 2026 First leg	(Netherlands) AFC Ajax	3-1	Shelbourne (Republic of Ireland)	Amsterdam
	Godts 6' (pen.) Wijndal 39' Dolberg 50'	Report	Kelly 84'	Stadium: Johan Cruyff Arena; Attendance: 51,871; Referee: A Karaoglan (Turkey)

6 August 2026 First leg	Shelbourne (Republic of Ireland)	2–2 (3-5 agg.)	(Netherlands) AFC Ajax	Drumcondra, Dublin
	Caffrey 24' Moore 85'	Report	Brandt 20' Gaaei 39'	Stadium: Tolka Park; Attendance: 4,344; Referee: Claudio Pereira (Portugal)

== Statistics ==
=== Appearances and goals ===
No.	Pos	Nat	Player	Total		Premier Division		FAI Cup		European Competitions	
No.	Pos	Nat	Player	Apps	Goals	Apps	Goals	Apps	Goals	Apps	Goals
1	GK	(Netherlands) NED	Wessel Speel	24	0	24	0	0	0	0	0
2	DF	(Republic of Ireland) IRL	Sean Gannon	24	0	10+11	0	0+1	0	0+2	0
4	DF	(Republic of Ireland) IRL	Kameron Ledwidge	41	0	34+2	0	1	0	4	0
5	MF	(England) ENG	Ellis Chapman	10	0	4+6	0	0	0	0	0
6	MF	(Republic of Ireland) IRL	Jonathan Lunney	26	1	18+5	1	0	0	1+2	0
7	MF	(England) ENG	Harry Wood	24	10	23+1	10	0	0	0	0
9	FW	(Republic of Ireland) IRL	Seán Boyd	27	4	8+19	4	0	0	0	0
10	FW	(Republic of Ireland) IRL	John Martin	21	8	15+6	8	0	0	0	0
11	FW	(Republic of Ireland) IRL	Mipo Odubeko	16	4	8+8	4	0	0	0	0
13	GK	(Scotland) SCO	Murray Johnson	0	0	0	0	0	0	0	0
14	MF	(Scotland) SCO	Ali Coote	34	3	12+18	2	1	0	2+1	1
15	DF	(England) ENG	Sam Bone	27	1	19+4	1	0+1	0	2+1	0
16	DF	(Northern Ireland) NIR	Odhrán Casey	19	0	14+1	0	1	0	1+2	0
17	FW	(Republic of Ireland) IRL	Daniel Kelly	37	12	23+9	9	1	1	4	2
18	DF	(England) ENG	James Norris	28	1	18+5	1	1	0	4	0
19	GK	(Wales) WAL	Eddie Beach	15	0	11	0	0	0	4	0
20	FW	(Portugal) POR	Rodrigo Freitas	28	1	8+15	0	1	0	3+1	1
21	MF	(Republic of Ireland) IRL	Jack-Henry-Francis	31	3	23+5	2	1	1	2	0
22	MF	(Republic of Ireland) IRL	Sean Moore	22	5	7+10	2	0+1	0	3+1	3
23	MF	(Scotland) SCO	Kerr McInroy	32	2	27+1	2	0	0	3+1	0
24	DF	(England) ENG	Zeno Ibsen Rossi	9	1	9	1	0	0	0	0
24	DF	(Austria) AUT	Marco Untergrabner	2	0	1+1	0	0	0	0	0
25	DF	(France) FRA	Milan Mbeng	25	1	19+1	1	1	0	4	0
27	MF	(Republic of Ireland) IRL	Evan Caffrey	39	2	27+7	1	1	0	4	1
28	MF	(Sweden) SWE	Maill Lundgren	12	0	5+7	0	0	0	0	0
29	DF	(Republic of Ireland) IRL	Paddy Barrett	21	2	16+1	2	0+1	0	3	0
31	GK	(Republic of Ireland) IRL	Carl Walshe	2	0	1+1	0	0	0	0	0
36	FW	(England) ENG	Will Jarvis	26	1	10+12	1	1	0	0+3	0
44	FW	(Republic of Ireland) IRL	Dan Ring	7	1	0+3	0	0+1	0	0+3	1
55	DF	(Republic of Ireland) IRL	James Roche	7	0	1+3	0	1	0	0+2	0
56	FW	(Republic of Ireland) IRL	Joey Wuna	1	0	0+1	0	0	0	0	0
73	GK	(Republic of Ireland) IRL	Finn Moylan	1	0	0	0	1	0	0	0

=== Goalscorers ===
Rank	No.	Pos.	Nat.	Player	Premier Division	FAI Cup	European Competitions	Total
1	17	MF	(Republic of Ireland)	Daniel Kelly	9	1	2	12
2	7	MF	(England)	Harry Wood	10	0	0	10
3	10	FW	(Republic of Ireland)	John Martin	8	0	0	8
4	22	MF	(Republic of Ireland)	Sean Moore	2	0	3	5
5	9	FW	(Republic of Ireland)	Séan Boyd	4	0	0	4
5	11	FW	(Republic of Ireland)	Mipo Odubeko	4	0	0	4
6	14	MF	(Scotland)	Ali Coote	2	0	1	3
6	21	MF	(Republic of Ireland)	Jack Henry-Francis	2	1	0	3
7	29	DF	(Republic of Ireland)	Paddy Barrett	2	0	0	2
7	23	MF	(Scotland)	Kerr McInroy	2	0	0	2
7	27	MF	(Republic of Ireland)	Evan Caffrey	1	0	1	2
8	6	MF	(Republic of Ireland)	JJ Lunney	1	0	0	1
8	24	DF	(England)	Zeno Ibsen Rossi	1	0	0	1
8	15	DF	(England)	Sam Bone	1	0	0	1
8	36	FW	(England)	Will Jarvis	1	0	0	1
8	18	DF	(England)	James Norris	1	0	0	1
8	25	DF	(France)	Milan Mbeng	1	0	0	1
8	20	FW	(Portugal)	Rodrigo Freitas	0	0	1	1
8	44	FW	(Republic of Ireland)	Dan Ring	0	0	1	1
Total					52	2	9	64
