= Milan Mbeng =

French footballer

Personal information
- Full name: Milan Bernhard Mbeng
- Date of birth: 6 April 2002 (age 24)
- Place of birth: Condé-sur-l'Escaut, France
- Height: 1.82 m (6 ft 0 in)
- Positions: Right back; centre back

Team information
- Current team: Shelbourne
- Number: 25

Youth career
- Lille
- –2021: Guingamp
- 2021–2022: Charleroi

Senior career*
Years	Team	Apps	(Gls)
2022–2024	Zébra Élites Charleroi	36	(2)
2025	Cork City	19	(0)
2025–	Shelbourne	30	(0)
- * Club domestic league appearances and goals as of 19:56, 10 November 2026 (UTC)

Milan Bernhard Mbeng (born 6 April 2002) is a French professional footballer who plays as a defender for League of Ireland Premier Division club Shelbourne.

== Career ==
=== Early career ===
Mbeng was born in Condé-sur-l'Escaut, France and came through the Lille and Guingamp youth academies, before moving to Charleroi in July 2021, playing with their reserve side Zébra Élites Charleroi in the Belgian Division 1 for 2 seasons, scoring 2 goals in 36 appearances. In July 2024, he went on trial with EFL League One club Barnsley and featured in a 3–1 win over Alfreton Town in a pre-season friendly, but the trial did not result in a contract with the club.

=== Cork City ===
On 27 January 2025, Mbeng signed for newly promoted League of Ireland Premier Division club Cork City on a one-year-contract after a successful trial at the club, following an unsuccessful trial at EFL League One club Barnsley. He made his debut for the club on 3 March 2025, replacing Malik Dijksteel from the bench in a 2–1 loss away to Waterford at the RSC.

=== Shelbourne ===
On 28 July 2025, Mbeng signed for fellow League of Ireland Premier Division club Shelbourne on a multi-year contract for an undisclosed fee.

== Career statistics ==
As of match played on 9 October 2026

Appearances and goals by club, season and competition
Club	Season	League			National Cup (Note: Includes FAI Cup)		Europe		Other		Total	
Club	Season	Division	Apps	Goals	Apps	Goals	Apps	Goals	Apps	Goals	Apps	Goals
Zébra Élites Charleroi	2022–23	Belgian Division 1	27	1	–		–		–		27	1
Zébra Élites Charleroi	2023–24	Belgian Division 1	9	1	–		–		–		9	1
Zébra Élites Charleroi	Total		36	2	–		–		–		36	2
Cork City	2025	LOI Premier Division	19	0	0	0	–		0 (Note: Appearance(s) in the Munster Senior Cup)	0	19	0
Shelbourne	2025	LOI Premier Division	10	0	1	0	9 (Note: 2 appearances in the UEFA Europa League; 7 appearances in the UEFA Conference League)	0	–		20	0
Shelbourne	2026	LOI Premier Division	20	0	1	0	4 (Note: Appearance(s) in the UEFA Conference League)	0	0 (Note: Appearance(s) in the Leinster Senior Cup)	0	25	0
Shelbourne	Total		30	0	2	0	13	0	0	0	45	0
Career Total			85	2	2	0	13	0	0	0	100	2
