= Marco Untergrabner =

Austrian footballer (born 2001)

Personal information
- Full name: Marco Untergrabner
- Date of birth: 2 November 2001 (age 25)
- Place of birth: Leoben, Austria
- Height: 1.94 m (6 ft 4 in)
- Position: Defender

Team information
- Current team: Shelbourne
- Number: 24

Youth career
- 2007–2009: SC Parschlug
- 2009–2011: SC Bruck/Mur
- 2011–2015: Grazer AK
- 2015–2020: Admira Wacker

Senior career*
Years	Team	Apps	(Gls)
2020–2022	USV Scheiblingkirchen-Warth	37	(16)
2022–2025	DSV Leoben	67	(17)
2025	SV Ried	0	(0)
2025	SV Ried II	7	(0)
2025–2026	Floridsdorfer AC	27	(3)
2026–	Shelbourne	3	(0)
- * Club domestic league appearances and goals as of 19:54, 10 November 2026 (UTC)

Marco Untergrabner (born 2 November 2001) is an Austrian professional footballer who plays as a defender for League of Ireland Premier Division club Shelbourne.

== Career ==
=== Early career ===
Untergrabner began playing football with SC Parschlug where he spent two seasons, before spending two more seasons with SC Bruck/Mur, four years with Grazer AK's academy and 5 years with the academy of Admira Wacker.

=== USV Scheiblingkirchen-Warth ===
In 2020, he signed for USV Scheiblingkirchen/Warth in Austria's fourth tier, the 1. Niederösterreichische Landesliga. He made a total of 37 appearances for the club, scoring 16 goals.

=== DSV Leoben ===
In the summer of 2022, he signed for his local club DSV Leoben. He was part of the team that won the Austrian Regionalliga Central title to earn promotion to the 2. Liga. The following season however they were relagated and in January 2025 with the in financial difficulties, they were expelled from the league and relegated to the fourth tier, with Untergrabner departing the club in January 2025.

=== SV Ried ===
On 24 January 2025, Untergrabner signed for 2. Liga club SV Ried until the end of the season, however he only made appearances for their reserve team SV Ried II in the third tier.

=== Floridsdorfer AC ===
On 19 June 2025, Untergrabner signed for Austrian second tier side Floridsdorfer AC on a one-year contract. He scored 3 goals in 28 appearances in all competitions during his season with the club.

=== Shelbourne ===
On 29 August 2026, he signed a long-term contract with League of Ireland Premier Division club Shelbourne.

== Personal life ==
His older brother Fabio and his grandfather Frantz are both former professional footballers.

== Career statistics ==
As of match played on 30 October 2026

Appearances and goals by club, season and competition
Club	Season	League			National cup (Note: Includes Austrian Cup & FAI Cup)		Other		Total	
Club	Season	Division	Apps	Goals	Apps	Goals	Apps	Goals	Apps	Goals
USV Scheiblingkirchen-Warth	2020–21	1. Niederösterreichische Landesliga	9	1	0	0	–		9	1
USV Scheiblingkirchen-Warth	2021–22	1. Niederösterreichische Landesliga	28	15	0	0	–		28	15
USV Scheiblingkirchen-Warth	Total		37	16	0	0	–		37	16
DSV Leoben	2022–23	Austrian Regionalliga Central	27	13	1	0	–		28	13
DSV Leoben	2023–24	2. Liga	26	1	5	0	–		31	1
DSV Leoben	2024–25	Austrian Regionalliga Central	14	3	1	0	–		15	3
DSV Leoben	Total		67	17	7	0	–		74	17
SV Ried	2024–25	2. Liga	0	0	–		–		0	0
SV Ried II	2024–25	Austrian Regionalliga Central	7	0	–		–		7	0
Floridsdorfer AC	2025–26	2. Liga	27	3	1	0	–		28	3
Shelbourne	2026	LOI Premier Division	3	0	–		–		3	0
Career Total			141	36	8	0	0	0	147	36

== Honours ==
DSV Leoben

- Austrian Regionalliga Central: 2022–23
