= Zishim Bawa =

Irish footballer

Personal information
- Date of birth: 15 August 2000 (age 26)
- Place of birth: Dublin, Ireland
- Position: Winger

Team information
- Current team: Umeå
- Number: 16

Youth career
- –2019: FC Barcelona Arizona
- 2019–2020: AYSO United
- 2020–2021: Olympians

Senior career*
Years	Team	Apps	(Gls)
2021–2023	Bodens BK	102	(32)
2024–2025	Drogheda United	25	(3)
2026–	Umeå	29	(9)
- * Club domestic league appearances and goals as of 16 November 2026

Zishim Bawa (born 15 August 2000) is an Irish born Nigerian professional footballer who plays as a winger for Umeå. He previously played in Sweden with Bodens BK and in the Republic of Ireland with Drogheda United.

== Career ==
=== Youth career ===
Bawa was born in Dublin, Ireland and moved to the country of his birth parents birth Nigeria, before moving to Arizona, United States where he attended high school and played football with FC Barcelona Arizona, AYSO United and then United Premier Soccer League club Olympians FC. He is a dual citizen of Nigeria and Ireland, stating "I would consider myself more Nigerian than Irish because I've lived in Nigeria more. But I would love the opportunity to play for Ireland. I mean it seems like a beautiful country."

=== Bodens BK ===
Bawa was scouted by Swedish club Bodens BK, signing for their club in 2021 and helping them to win Division 2 in 2022 to gain promotion to the Ettan. He scored 32 goals in 106 games during his 3 seasons with the club.

=== Drogheda United ===
Bawa went on trial with League of Ireland Premier Division club Drogheda United during their pre-season for their 2024 season. He sufficiently impressed on trial to earn a contract with the club in February 2024. On 23 February 2024, he scored his first goal for the club in a 4–1 defeat at home to Waterford. On 13 June 2024, Bawa suffered an ankle injury in a 3–0 defeat to Galway United that ended his season prematurely. On 7 February 2025, he appeared in the 2025 President of Ireland's Cup in a 2–0 defeat to Shelbourne at Tolka Park.

== Career statistics ==
As of match played on 30 May 2025

Appearances and goals by club, season and competition
Club	Season	League			National Cup (Note: Includes Swedish Cup & FAI Cup)		Other		Total	
Club	Season	Division	Apps	Goals	Apps	Goals	Apps	Goals	Apps	Goals
Bodens BK	2021	Division 2			0	0	–			
Bodens BK	2022	Division 2			0	0	–			
Bodens BK	2023	Ettan	27	7	0	0	–		27	7
Bodens BK	Total		106	32	0	0	–		106	32
Drogheda United	2024	LOI Premier Division	17	3	0	0	1 (Note: Appearance(s) in the Leinster Senior Cup)	0	18	3
Drogheda United	2025	LOI Premier Division	8	0	0	0	3 (Note: 1 appearance in the President of Ireland's Cup; 2 appearances in the Leinster Senior Cup)	0	11	0
Drogheda United	Total		25	3	0	0	4	0	29	3
Career Total			131	35	0	0	4	0	135	35
