= Sean Moore (footballer) =

Irish footballer

Personal information
- Full name: Sean Ryan Moore
- Date of birth: 13 August 2005 (age 21)
- Place of birth: Belfast, Northern Ireland
- Positions: Winger; full back

Team information
- Current team: Shelbourne
- Number: 22

Youth career
- Cliftonville

Senior career*
| Years | Team | Apps | (Gls) |
| 2021–2023 | Cliftonville | 32 | (5) |
| 2023–2025 | West Ham United | 0 | (0) |
| 2025– | Shelbourne | 19 | (2) |

International career^{‡}
| 2022–2023 | Northern Ireland U18 | 2 | (0) |
| 2023–2024 | Republic of Ireland U19 | 8 | (1) |
| 2024 | Republic of Ireland U21 | 2 | (0) |
- * Club domestic league appearances and goals as of 19:52, 10 November 2026 (UTC) ‡ National team caps and goals as of 10:57, 24 October 2026 (UTC)

Sean Ryan Moore (born 13 August 2005) is an Irish footballer who plays as a winger and full back for League of Ireland Premier Division club Shelbourne.

== Club career ==
=== Cliftonville ===
Born in Belfast, Moore began his career with Cliftonville.

On 8 January 2022, Moore debuted in the Irish Cup against Islandmagee at the age of 16. His first start came against Larne on 15 October, a match in which he was sent off in the 50th minute as Cliftonville were beaten 4–0. In the return fixture, he scored his first senior goal as Cliftonville defeated Larne 2–1 on 2 January 2023.

His form saw him linked with a move away from the club in January 2023. On 25 February, he scored both goals in a 2–1 league victory over Glentoran.

At the end of his breakthrough season, Moore was named in the 2022–23 NIFL Premiership Team of the Year and was awarded NI Football Writers' Association Young Player of the Year.

=== West Ham United ===
In June 2023, he signed for Premier League club West Ham United on a three-year contract.

During his two seasons in East London, Moore made 52 appearances for West Ham's under-21 team, scoring ten goals.

=== Shelbourne ===
On 27 July 2025, Moore signed for League of Ireland Premier Division club Shelbourne on a multi-year contract for an undisclosed fee. In September 2025, Shelbourne manager Joey O'Brien left Moore out of the club's League Phase squad for the UEFA Conference League. On 23 July 2026, he scored a brace in a 5–2 win over Nõmme Kalju in the UEFA Conference League.

== International career ==
Moore has represented Northern Ireland at under-18 level. In 2023, he switched allegiances to the Republic, making his debut for the under-19 team against Greece. In November 2024, he received his first call up to the Republic of Ireland U21 squad for their two friendlies against Sweden U21 in Marbella, Spain. He made his debut in a 2–0 defeat to Sweden on 14 November 2024.

== Career statistics ==
As of match played 30 October 2026

Appearances and goals by club, season and competition
| Club | Season | League | | | National Cup (Note: Includes Irish Cup & FAI Cup) | | League Cup (Note: Includes Northern Ireland Football League Cup & National League Cup) | | Europe | | Other | | Total | |
| Club | Season | Division | Apps | Goals | Apps | Goals | Apps | Goals | Apps | Goals | Apps | Goals | Apps | Goals |
|---|---|---|---|---|---|---|---|---|---|---|---|---|---|---|
| Cliftonville | 2021–22 | NIFL Premiership | 0 | 0 | 1 | 0 | 0 | 0 | – | | 0 | 0 | 1 | 0 |
| Cliftonville | 2022–23 | NIFL Premiership | 32 | 5 | 3 | 1 | 3 | 0 | 0 (Note: Appearance(s) in the UEFA Europa Conference League) | 0 | 3 (Note: 2 appearances in the 2023 NIFL Premiership UEFA Europa Conference League Play-offs & 1 appearance in the Scottish Challenge Cup) | 0 | 41 | 6 |
| Cliftonville | Total | | 32 | 5 | 4 | 1 | 3 | 0 | 0 | 0 | 3 | 0 | 42 | 6 |
| West Ham United U21s | 2023–24 | — | | | | | | | | | 4 (Note: Appearance(s) in the EFL Trophy) | 0 | 4 | 0 |
| West Ham United U21s | 2024–25 | — | | | | | 3 | 0 | — | | 2 | 0 | 5 | 0 |
| West Ham United U21s | Total | | – | | | | 3 | 0 | – | | 6 | 0 | 9 | 0 |
| Shelbourne | 2025 | LOI Premier Division | 2 | 0 | 0 | 0 | — | | 1 (Note: Appearance(s) in the UEFA Conference League) | 0 | — | | 3 | 0 |
| Shelbourne | 2026 | LOI Premier Division | 17 | 2 | 1 | 0 | — | | 4 | 3 | 1 (Note: Appearance(s) in the Leinster Senior Cup) | 1 | 23 | 6 |
| Shelbourne | Total | | 19 | 2 | 1 | 0 | — | | 5 | 3 | 1 | 1 | 26 | 6 |
| Career total | | | 51 | 7 | 5 | 1 | 6 | 0 | 5 | 3 | 10 | 1 | 77 | 12 |

== Honours ==
Individual

- NIFL Premiership Team of the Year (1): 2022–23
- NIFWA Young Player of the Year: 2022–23
