= James Norris (footballer) =

English footballer (born 2003)

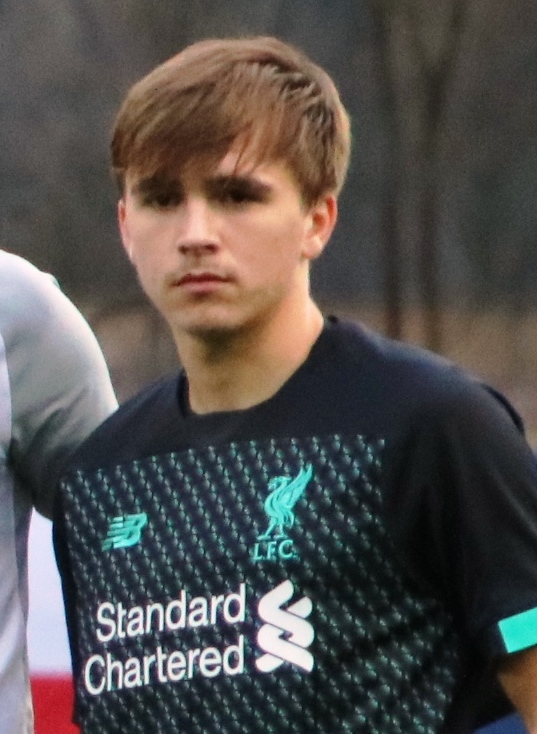
- Norris in 2019

Personal information
- Full name: James Barry Norris
- Date of birth: 4 April 2003 (age 23)
- Place of birth: Liverpool, England
- Height: 1.70 m (5 ft 7 in)
- Position: Left-back

Team information
- Current team: Shelbourne
- Number: 18

Youth career
- Tranmere Rovers
- Liverpool

Senior career*
Years	Team	Apps	(Gls)
2019–2026	Liverpool	0	(0)
2023–2024	→ Tranmere Rovers (loan)	16	(0)
2025	→ Shelbourne (loan)	32	(0)
2026–	Shelbourne	23	(2)

International career^{‡}
2018–2019	England U16	11	(0)
2019	England U17	6	(0)
2021	England U18	1	(0)
2021–2022	England U19	4	(0)
- * Club domestic league appearances and goals as of 19:46, 10 November 2026 (UTC) ‡ National team caps and goals as of 14:32, 17 February 2025 (UTC)

James Barry Norris (born 4 April 2003) is an English professional footballer who plays as a left-back for League of Ireland Premier Division club Shelbourne.

== Club career ==
=== Liverpool ===
Norris made his professional debut for Liverpool whilst still a scholar on 17 December 2019, coming on as a substitute in the away match against Aston Villa in the quarter-finals of the EFL Cup.

==== Tranmere Rovers loan ====
Norris joined Tranmere Rovers on a season-long loan on 1 September 2023. He made his debut on 5 September, in an EFL Trophy fixture against Fleetwood Town, being substituted after only 42 minutes.

=== Shelbourne ===
On 17 February 2025, he signed for League of Ireland Premier Division club Shelbourne on loan until the end of their season in November. On 1 January 2026, it was announced that Norris had signed for the club on a permanent basis.

== International career ==
In September 2019, Norris started for the England under-17 team as they defeated hosts Poland to win the Syrenka Cup.

On 29 March 2021, Norris made his debut for England U18s during a 2–0 win away to Wales at the Leckwith Stadium.

On 6 September 2021, Norris made his debut for the England U19s during a 1–1 draw with Germany in Bad Dürrheim.

== Career statistics ==
As of match played 30 October 2026

Appearances and goals by club, season and competition
Club	Season	League			National Cup (Note: Includes FA Cup & FAI Cup)		League Cup (Note: Includes EFL Cup)		Europe		Other		Total	
Club	Season	Division	Apps	Goals	Apps	Goals	Apps	Goals	Apps	Goals	Apps	Goals	Apps	Goals
Liverpool U21	2019–20	—									1 (Note: Appearance in EFL Trophy)	0	1	0
Liverpool U21	2021–22	—									1	0	1	0
Liverpool U21	2022–23	—									2	0	2	0
Liverpool U21	2024–25	—									3	1	3	1
Liverpool U21	Total		–								7	1	7	1
Liverpool	2019–20	Premier League	0	0	0	0	1	0	0	0	0	0	1	0
Liverpool	2020–21	Premier League	0	0	0	0	0	0	0	0	0	0	0	0
Liverpool	2021–22	Premier League	0	0	1	0	0	0	0	0	—		1	0
Liverpool	2022–23	Premier League	0	0	0	0	0	0	0	0	0	0	0	0
Liverpool	2023–24	Premier League	0	0	—		—		0	0	—		0	0
Liverpool	2024–25	Premier League	0	0	0	0	0	0	0	0	—		0	0
Liverpool	2025–26	Premier League	0	0	0	0	0	0	0	0	—		0	0
Liverpool	Total		0	0	1	0	1	0	0	0	0	0	2	0
Tranmere Rovers (loan)	2023–24	EFL League Two	16	0	1	0	—		—		3	0	20	0
Shelbourne (loan)	2025	LOI Premier Division	32	0	2	0	—		11 (Note: 4 appearances in the UEFA Champions League; 2 appearances in the UEFA Europa League; 3 appearances in the UEFA Conference League)	0	—		45	0
Shelbourne	2026	LOI Premier Division	23	2	1	0	—		4 (Note: Appearances in the UEFA Conference League)	0	0	0	28	2
Career total			71	2	5	0	1	0	15	0	10	1	101	3

== Honours ==
Liverpool Academy

- Lancashire Senior Cup: 2021–22
