= Mipo Odubeko =

Irish footballer

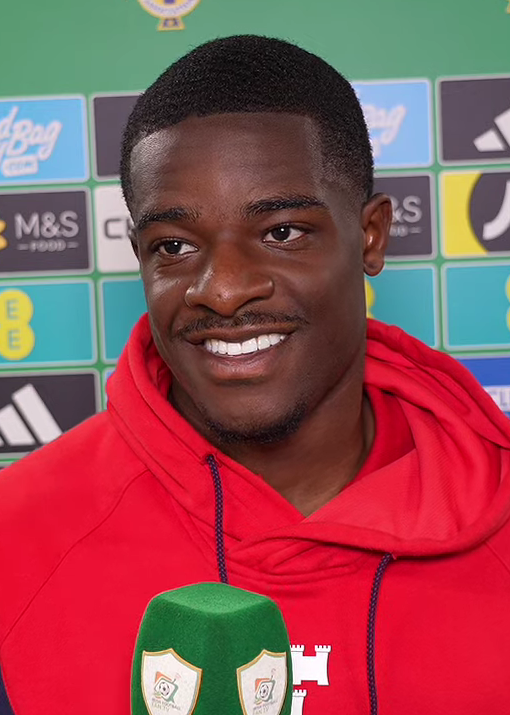
- Odubeko in 2025

Personal information
- Full name: Ademipo Ibrahim Odubeko
- Date of birth: 21 October 2002 (age 24)
- Place of birth: Dublin, Ireland
- Height: 1.82 m (6 ft 0 in)
- Position: Forward

Team information
- Current team: Shelbourne
- Number: 11

Youth career
- Crumlin United
- –2015: St Joseph's Boys
- 2015–2016: Manchester City
- 2016–2019: Manchester United
- 2019–2020: West Ham United

Senior career*
Years	Team	Apps	(Gls)
2020–2023	West Ham United	0	(0)
2021–2022	→ Huddersfield Town (loan)	6	(0)
2022	→ Doncaster Rovers (loan)	16	(2)
2022–2023	→ Port Vale (loan)	22	(3)
2023–2024	Marítimo	0	(0)
2023–2024	Marítimo B	5	(0)
2024	Fleetwood Town	5	(0)
2025–	Shelbourne	51	(12)

International career^{‡}
- Republic of Ireland U16
2019	Republic of Ireland U17	2	(0)
2022	Republic of Ireland U21	4	(1)
- * Club domestic league appearances and goals as of 19:29, 10 November 2026 (UTC) ‡ National team caps and goals as of 09:39, 15 January 2025 (UTC)

Ademipo Ibrahim Odubeko (born 21 October 2002) is an Irish professional footballer who plays as a forward for League of Ireland Premier Division club Shelbourne.

Odubeko made his professional debut for West Ham United in 2021 and has represented the Republic of Ireland on the international stage at various youth levels. However, he remains eligible to play for both England and Nigeria. He spent the 2021–22 season on loan at Huddersfield Town and Doncaster Rovers and joined Port Vale on loan for the 2022–23 campaign. He joined Portuguese club Marítimo for the 2023–24 season before he returned to England to briefly play for Fleetwood Town. He joined Irish club Shelbourne in December 2024.

== Club career ==
=== Early life and career ===
Odubeko was born in Dublin, Ireland to Nigerian parents and grew up in Tallaght, and he spent his formative years playing football for St Joseph's Boys. He acted as a ball boy for multiple Shamrock Rovers matches in Tallaght Stadium during his teenage years. When he was 14 years old, Odubeko and his family relocated to Manchester in England where, despite initially encountering registration concerns due to FIFA's prohibition on the international transfer of minors, he later represented both Manchester City and Manchester United at youth level. He spent the majority of his remaining schoolboy years with the latter, where he scored on his U18 Premier League debut and netted 35 times in total, before joining the academy side of fellow Premier League club West Ham United in 2019.

=== West Ham United ===
"Mipo signing for West Ham is another really positive story for the Academy. He is a promising player we are looking forward to working with and this move is a great opportunity for him to join us and continue his journey..."

— West Ham United academy manager Ricky Martin, October 2019.

In October 2019, shortly after his 17th birthday, Odubeko turned down a contract extension with Manchester United in order to sign a three-year deal with West Ham. Over the course of the next two seasons, he excelled with the club's development side and scored eleven goals in ten appearances in the Premier League 2, winning the competition's Player of the Month award in April 2021 in the process. Odubeko's form at youth level caught the attention of first-team manager David Moyes during the 2020–21 season and he made two senior appearances for the campaign, making his debut as a substitute for Michail Antonio in the club's 1–0 FA Cup third round victory over Stockport County, before featuring again in the following round of the competition against his former side Manchester United. Throughout the season, he also trained regularly with the senior team and was named in the club's matchday squad on 18 occasions throughout the Premier League campaign. He was released by West Ham at the end of the 2022–23 season, having made two appearances for the club. He trained with Dutch Eerste Divisie side VVV-Venlo in July 2023.

==== Huddersfield Town loan ====
On 30 August 2021, Odubeko moved on a season-long loan to EFL Championship side Huddersfield Town, where he was given the number 7 shirt. Leigh Bromby, Huddersfield's Head of Football Operations, said that he would compete with Danny Ward, Fraizer Campbell and Josh Koroma for a first-team place in the absence of star striker Jordan Rhodes; head coach Carlos Corberán said Odubeko "offers us something different in the attacking areas". He made his debut for the club in the English Football League on 11 September, coming on as a 78th-minute substitute for Fraizer Campbell in a 2–1 defeat at Stoke City. However, he found his first-team opportunities limited at the Kirklees Stadium as Huddersfield played with only one striker on the pitch and one striker on the bench. After only making six substitute appearances in the first half of the 2021–22 season, amounting to 107 minutes of playing time, West Ham activated his recall clause, and his loan was ended on 4 January 2022.

==== Doncaster Rovers loan ====
On 27 January 2022, Odubeko joined EFL League One side Doncaster Rovers on loan for the remainder of the 2021–22 season. He scored his debut goal for the club, a powerful shot from 15 yards (14 m), in a 2–1 defeat to Bolton Wanderers at the Keepmoat Stadium on 15 April. He scored another goal three days later in a 3–3 draw at Shrewsbury Town. He scored two goals in eight starts and eight substitute appearances for Gary McSheffrey's side, who were relegated in 22nd-place. He admitted the loan spell had been "testing" and that relegation had hurt, leaving him "sad it had to end like this".

==== Port Vale loan ====
On 26 August 2022, Odubeko signed for League One side Port Vale on a season-long loan. Manager Darrell Clarke compared him to Kian Harratt, who had impressed on loan at the club the previous season, saying "they love to stretch the game [and] run in behind a defence". Odubeko made his debut at Vale Park four days later, and impressed coach Andy Crosby as he played the full ninety minutes against Stockport County in the EFL Trophy whilst Ellis Harrison – the club's only other available specialist striker – was rested. Odubeko scored "with a powerful downward header" on his league debut for the club in a 2–2 draw with Cheltenham Town on 3 September. He ended the 2022–23 campaign with four goals in 27 games, having not featured after 11 February.

=== Marítimo ===
On 17 July 2023, Odubeko signed a two-year contract with Liga Portugal 2 club Marítimo. He played five games for the B team in the Campeonato de Portugal during the 2023–24 season. On 18 July 2024, Odubeko departed the club having had his contract terminated by mutual consent. He then had an unsuccessful trial with English club Barnsley, managed by his former Port Vale boss Darrell Clarke.

=== Fleetwood Town ===
On 12 August 2024, Odubeko joined League Two club Fleetwood Town on an initial one-year deal with the option for a further twelve months. On 11 December 2024, Fleetwood confirmed that they had cancelled Odubeko's contract after he had made 11 appearances in all competitions, scoring once.

=== Shelbourne ===
On 20 December 2024, Odubeko signed for League of Ireland Premier Division club Shelbourne ahead of their 2025 season. He said he appreciated the straight talking of head coach Damien Duff. He scored the opening goal in the 2025 President of Ireland's Cup victory over Drogheda United. In April 2025, pundit Roddy Collins said that he was "probably one of the worst finishers I've seen in Irish football", which Duff retorted as being "a really poor comment". Odubeko had a transfer to Belgian Pro League club Cercle Brugg fall through in February 2026.

== International career ==
Odubeko was born in Ireland and is of Nigerian descent through his parents, who were both born in the African country. He represented the Republic of Ireland's under-16 side in their successful 2017 Victory Shield campaign and was selected to play for the under-17 team in two matches against Finland in March 2019. However, he was overlooked for Ireland's squad for the 2019 UEFA European Under-17 Championship despite his strong form at club level and, having not represented the nation in the intervening period, rejected subsequent call-ups to the under-21 squad in 2021, sparking speculation that he could switch allegiances to Nigeria. He also remains eligible to represent England. Odubeko made his debut for the Republic of Ireland under-21 team on 29 March 2022 in a 2–0 win away to Sweden in the 2023 UEFA European Under-21 Championship qualifiers. On 3 June 2022, he scored his first goal for the under-21s in a 3–0 win over Bosnia and Herzegovina at Tallaght Stadium.

== Style of play ==
Odubeko is a striker who boasts a prolific goalscoring record at youth level. He is predominantly right-footed but has been described as being "strong, powerful and fast" and as a player who is capable of playing on "his right and left side and who is good in the air" by former coach Bernard Byrne. This has been echoed by Republic of Ireland under-21 manager Jim Crawford who, in 2021, reflected on Odubeko as being a player who possesses "unbelievable pace, can score goals and would be an asset to any squad."

== Career statistics ==
As of match played 30 October 2026

Appearances and goals by club, season and competition
Club	Season	League			National Cup (Note: Includes FA Cup, Taça de Portugal, FAI Cup)		League Cup (Note: Includes EFL Cup, Taça da Liga, League of Ireland Cup)		Europe		Other		Total	
Club	Season	Division	Apps	Goals	Apps	Goals	Apps	Goals	Apps	Goals	Apps	Goals	Apps	Goals
West Ham United U21	2020–21	—									1 (Note: Appearances in the EFL Trophy)	2	1	2
West Ham United	2020–21	Premier League	0	0	2	0	0	0	—		—		2	0
West Ham United	2021–22	Premier League	0	0	0	0	0	0	0	0	—		0	0
West Ham United	2022–23	Premier League	0	0	0	0	0	0	0	0	—		0	0
West Ham United	Total		0	0	2	0	0	0	0	0	—		2	0
Huddersfield Town (loan)	2021–22	Championship	6	0	0	0	—		—		—		6	0
Doncaster Rovers (loan)	2021–22	League One	16	2	0	0	—		—		—		16	2
Port Vale (loan)	2022–23	League One	22	3	1	0	0	0	—		4	1	27	4
Marítimo	2023–24	Liga Portugal 2	0	0	0	0	0	0	—		—		0	0
Marítimo B	2023–24	Campeonato de Portugal	5	0	—		—		—		—		5	0
Fleetwood Town	2024–25	League Two	5	0	1	0	2	0	—		3	1	11	1
Shelbourne	2025	LOI Premier Division	35	8	1	0	—		13 (Note: 4 appearances, 1 goal in the UEFA Champions League; 2 appearances, 1 goal in the UEFA Europa League; 7 appearances, 1 goal in the UEFA Conference League)	3	1 (Note: Appearance in the President of Ireland's Cup)	1	50	12
Shelbourne	2026	LOI Premier Division	16	4	0	0	—		0 (Note: Appearances in the UEFA Conference League)	0	0 (Note: Appearances in the Leinster Senior Cup)	0	16	4
Shelbourne	Total		51	12	1	0	—		13	3	1	1	66	16
Career total			105	17	5	0	2	0	13	3	9	5	134	25

== Honours ==
Shelbourne

- President of Ireland's Cup: 2025
