= 2025 President of Ireland's Cup =

- Event: President of Ireland's Cup
Shelbourne	Drogheda United
2	0
- Date: 7 February 2025
- Venue: Tolka Park, Dublin
- Referee: Paul Norton
- Attendance: 4,584

The 2025 President of Ireland's Cup was the eleventh edition of the President of Ireland's Cup. The match was played on 7 February between the champions of the 2024 League of Ireland Premier Division, Shelbourne, and the 2024 FAI Cup winners, Drogheda United, at Tolka Park.

Shelbourne won the game 2-0 to win the Cup for the first time. They opened the scoring in the 29th minute when Mipo Odubeko back-heeled the ball into the net from close range after a corner from the right. Sean Boyd made it 2-0 five minutes later with a low right-footed finish into the left corner of the net from eight yards out.

== Details ==
7 February 2025
19:45 GMT

Shelbourne	2-0	Drogheda United
M. Odubeko 29'; S. Boyd 34'	Report

Tolka Park
Attendance: 4,584
Referee: Paul Norton

Shelbourne	Drogheda United

GK	1	(Republic of Ireland) Conor Kearns	(yellow card) 45+1'
RB	2	(Republic of Ireland) Seán Gannon
CB	29	(Republic of Ireland) Paddy Barrett
CB	15	(England) Sam Bone
LB	4	(Republic of Ireland) Kameron Ledwidge
RM	14	(Scotland) Ali Coote	(substituted off) 64'
CM	23	(Scotland) Kerr McInroy	(substituted off) 73'
CM	8	(Republic of Ireland) Mark Coyle (c)	(substituted off) 64'
LM	7	(England) Harry Wood	(substituted off) 73'
ST	9	(Republic of Ireland) Seán Boyd	34'
ST	11	(Republic of Ireland) Mipo Odubeko	(yellow card) 20'	29'	(substituted off) 64'
Substitutes:
AM	5	(England) Ellis Chapman	(substituted in) 64'
CM	6	(Republic of Ireland) Jonathan Lunney	(substituted in) 64'
ST	10	(Republic of Ireland) John Martin
GK	19	(Republic of Ireland) Lorcan Healy
CB	24	(Republic of Ireland) Lewis Temple
CM	27	(Republic of Ireland) Evan Caffrey	(substituted in) 73'
RM	28	(Republic of Ireland) Ryan O'Kane	(substituted in) 73'
CB	55	(Republic of Ireland) James Roche
LM	77	(England) Rayhaan Tulloch	(substituted in) 64'
Manager:
(Republic of Ireland) Damien Duff

GK	45	(United States) Luke Dennison	(red card) 54'
RB	23	(United States) Owen Lambe
CB	4	(Republic of Ireland) Andrew Quinn	(substituted off) 46'
CB	22	(Republic of Ireland) Conor Keeley
CB	5	(England) Aaron Harper-Bailey
LB	3	(Republic of Ireland) Conor Kane
CM	17	(Republic of Ireland) Shane Farrell	(yellow card) 38' (substituted off) 65'
CM	19	(Republic of Ireland) Ryan Brennan (c)	(substituted off) 71'
CAM	7	(Republic of Ireland) Darragh Markey
ST	16	(Nigeria) Zishim Bawa	(yellow card) 45+1'	(substituted off) 65'
ST	9	(Wales) Josh Thomas	(substituted off) 55'
Substitutes:
CM	6	(Republic of Ireland) Paul Doyle	(substituted in) 71'
LW	11	(Republic of Ireland) Thomas Oluwa	(substituted in) 65'
CB	15	(England) George Cooper	(substituted in) 46'
CM	21	(Republic of Ireland) Luke Heeney	(substituted in) 65'
LW	24	(Republic of Ireland) Warren Davis
ST	25	(Republic of Ireland) Bridel Bosakani
GK	27	(Republic of Ireland) Jack Brady	(substituted in) 55'
LB	31	(Republic of Ireland) Kieran Cruise
CM	33	(Republic of Ireland) Conall Cronin
Manager:
(Republic of Ireland) Kevin Doherty

== See also ==
- 2025 League of Ireland Premier Division
- 2025 FAI Cup
