= Harry Wood (footballer, born 2002) =

English footballer (born 2002)

Personal information
- Full name: Harry Wood
- Date of birth: 2 August 2002 (age 24)
- Place of birth: Leeds, England
- Height: 5 ft 9 in (1.75 m)
- Position: Attacking midfielder

Team information
- Current team: Stockport County
- Number: 16

Youth career
- –2017: Manchester United
- 2017–2021: Hull City

Senior career*
Years	Team	Apps	(Gls)
2021–2024	Hull City	2	(0)
2021–2022	→ Scunthorpe United (loan)	10	(0)
2023	→ Shelbourne (loan)	14	(2)
2024	→ Grimsby Town (loan)	10	(1)
2024–2026	Shelbourne	73	(19)
2026–	Stockport County	14	(3)
- * Club domestic league appearances and goals as of 11:20, 13 November 2026 (UTC)

Harry Wood (born 2 August 2002) is an English professional footballer who plays as an attacking midfielder or right midfielder for EFL League One club Stockport County.

== Career ==
=== Hull City ===
Born in Leeds, England, Wood joined the Hull City academy after a brief spell at Manchester United.

On 8 September 2020, he was promoted to the Under-21's team for an EFL Trophy fixture against Leicester City U21. On 14 October 2020, Wood signed a one-year contract extension with the club.

Wood made his professional debut for the first team on the final day of the 2020–21 season – coming on as an 81st-minute substitute for Regan Slater away at Charlton Athletic. On 10 May 2021, Wood signed a new two-year contract with Hull City.

==== Scunthorpe United loan ====
On 31 August 2021, Wood moved to League Two club Scunthorpe United on a season-long loan. He made his debut for the club in a 2–0 loss against Northampton Town on 4 September 2021, playing the full length of the match. Due to competition from other players, Wood lost his first team place and did not appear in the squad for two months. On 15 January 2022, he made his return to the first team, coming on as a late substitute in a 0–2 loss against Exeter City. In a match against Bristol Rovers on 25 January 2022, Wood set up two late goals for Sam Burns– ultimately ending in a 3–2 loss. On 31 January 2022, Wood was recalled by Hull City.

==== Return to Hull City ====
Wood made his second, and final, appearance for Hull as a late substitute in a 0–0 draw with Luton Town on the last game of the 2022–23 season. Following this, the club opted to take up their option of a contract extension, which ensured Wood remained under contract for the 2023–24 season. The following month, he signed another contract extension with the club.

==== Shelbourne loan ====
On 6 July 2023, Wood was loaned out to League of Ireland Premier Division side Shelbourne until 13 November alongside teammate Harry Fisk, though the latter joined on a permanent deal. He made his debut for the club in a 4–0 win against UCD, coming on as a 75th minute substitute. Wood then scored his first goal for Shelbourne two weeks later on 28 July 2023, in a 2–0 win against Cork City. This was followed by his second goal in a 1–1 draw against Dundalk. He assisted four times in the next three matches, including twice against St Patrick's Athletic on 1 September 2023. On the last game of the season, Wood set up one of the goals in a 4–0 win against Drogheda United to help Shelbourne qualify for the UEFA Conference League. By the end of the 2023 season, he had made fifteen appearances and scored two times in all competitions.

==== Grimsby Town loan ====
On 12 January 2024, Wood joined League Two side Grimsby Town on loan for the remainder of the season. He scored on his debut for the club, having came on as a late substitute in a 5–5 draw against Notts County. Despite having his playing time coming from the substitute bench, Wood contributed to Grimsby's League Two survival by beating Swindon Town 2–0 on 20 April 2024. By the end of the 2023–24 season, he had made ten appearances and scored once in all competitions. Following the loan, Wood returned to his parent club.

=== Shelbourne ===
On 1 July 2024, Wood re-joined Shelbourne – this time permanently for an undisclosed fee on a two-and-a-half year contract.

His first game after signing for the club on a permanent basis was a 1–1 draw against Drogheda United on 4 July 2024. He became a first team regular, playing in the midfield position.

On 1 November 2024, Wood scored the title-winning goal as the club won the league for the first time since 2006, after a 1–0 win against Derry City at the Brandywell. By the end of the 2024 season, he had made twenty appearances and scored once in all competitions. Following this, Wood signed a contract extension with Shelbourne.

On 21 August 2025, Wood scored his first goal in a European competition for Shelbourne, converting a penalty against Linfield in a 3–1 win at Tolka Park in the final qualifying round of the 2025–26 Europa League. Wood then scored in the return fixture at Windsor Park, as Shelbourne secured a 2–0 win and qualified for a European competition for the first time in their history.

=== Stockport County ===
On 16 July 2026, Wood signed for Stockport County on a three-year deal for an undisclosed fee.

== Career statistics ==
As of match played on 8 November 2026

Appearances and goals by club, season and competition
Club	Season	League			National Cup (Note: Includes FA Cup, FAI Cup)		League Cup (Note: Includes EFL Cup)		Europe		Other		Total	
Club	Season	Division	Apps	Goals	Apps	Goals	Apps	Goals	Apps	Goals	Apps	Goals	Apps	Goals
Hull City	2020–21	EFL League One	1	0	0	0	0	0	–		0	0	1	0
Hull City	2021–22	EFL Championship	0	0	0	0	1	0	–		–		1	0
Hull City	2022–23	EFL Championship	1	0	0	0	0	0	–		–		1	0
Hull City	2023–24	EFL Championship	0	0	0	0	0	0	–		–		0	0
Hull City	Total		2	0	0	0	1	0	–		0	0	3	0
Scunthorpe United (loan)	2021–22	EFL League Two	10	0	1	0	0	0	–		2 (Note: Appearances in EFL Trophy)	0	13	0
Shelbourne (loan)	2023	LOI Premier Division	14	2	1	0	–		–		–		15	2
Grimsby Town (loan)	2023–24	EFL League Two	10	1	–		–		–		–		10	1
Shelbourne	2024	LOI Premier Division	13	1	3	0	–		4 (Note: Appearances in the UEFA Conference League)	0	–		20	1
Shelbourne	2025	LOI Premier Division	36	9	1	0	–		14 (Note: 4 appearances in the UEFA Champions League; 2 appearances in the UEFA Europa League; 8 appearances, 2 goals in the UEFA Conference League)	2	1 (Note: Appearance in the President of Ireland's Cup)	0	52	11
Shelbourne	2026	LOI Premier Division	24	9	–		–		–		0	0	24	9
Shelbourne	Total		73	19	4	0	–		18	2	1	0	96	21
Stockport County	2026–27	EFL League One	14	3	1	0	1	0	–		0	0	16	3
Career total			123	25	7	0	2	0	18	2	3	0	153	27

== Honours ==
Hull City

- EFL League One: 2020–21

Shelbourne

- League of Ireland Premier Division: 2024
- President of Ireland's Cup: 2025
