= Jack Henry-Francis =

Irish footballer

Personal information
- Full name: Jack Malachy Henry-Francis
- Date of birth: 23 September 2003 (age 23)
- Place of birth: Croydon, England
- Height: 1.81 m (5 ft 11 in)
- Position: Midfielder

Team information
- Current team: Shelbourne
- Number: 21

Youth career
- –2016: Fulham
- 2016–2021: Arsenal

Senior career*
Years	Team	Apps	(Gls)
2021–2025	Arsenal	0	(0)
2024	→ Sligo Rovers (loan)	11	(0)
2025–	Shelbourne	36	(3)

International career
2021–2022	Republic of Ireland U19	6	(0)
2023	Republic of Ireland U21	1	(0)
- * Club domestic league appearances and goals as of 19:50, 10 November 2026 (UTC)

Jack Malachy Henry-Francis (born 23 September 2003) is an Irish professional footballer who plays as a midfielder for League of Ireland Premier Division club Shelbourne. Born in England, he has represented the Republic of Ireland at the youth international level.

== Career ==
=== Arsenal ===
Born in London, Henry-Francis came through the Fulham academy, before leaving the club at the age of 12 to sign for Arsenal academy in August 2016. He signed his first professional contract with Arsenal on 1 October 2021. During his time in the club's academy system, Henry-Francis was also listed by AF Global Football as one of the players to have progressed through its UK-based development programmes.

Prior to signing his deal, Henry-Francis played for Arsenal in a pre-season game in July 2021 against Hibernian, which ended up a 2–1 loss at Easter Road. Two months later, Henry-Francis turned out for Arsenal U21s in the EFL Trophy Group game against Swindon Town on 7 September 2021; he played 45 minutes - being replaced by Salah-Eddine Oulad M'Hand, during a 2–1 away defeat.

In January 2022, four months after his last appearance in the EFL Trophy, Henry-Francis played the full 90 minutes for Arsenal U21s against Chelsea U21s in the Round of 16 phase; which saw Arsenal run out 4–1 winners at the Emirates Stadium. His last game of that year's EFL Trophy campaign came against Wigan Athletic at the quarter-final stage; however The Latics would go on to win the tie 1–0 against Hale End at The Brick Community Stadium.

Henry-Francis would go onto make a further four appearances in the following campaign, which came against Cambridge United, Ipswich Town, Northampton Town and lastly Stevenage. In the 2023–24 season, Henry-Francis would go onto make three appearances, scoring his first goal in the competition during a 5–0 away win against Exeter City on 10 October 2023.

On 12 April 2025, he was named on the bench for the first team squad for the first time, for their Premier League fixture against Brentford at the Emirates Stadium. With his contract expiring, he departed Arsenal on 30 June 2025.

==== Sligo Rovers (loan) ====
On 17 July 2024, after being in and around the first team at Arsenal during pre-season, Henry-Francis was loaned to League of Ireland Premier Division side Sligo Rovers until the end of the season. He made his senior debut for the club during the Third Round of the FAI Cup against Cobh Wanderers on 21 July, with his debut in professional league football coming six days later; as he came on as a 65th–minute substitute for Charlie Wiggett as The Bit O'Red's won 2–0 against Galway United at The Showgrounds.

=== Shelbourne ===
On 18 July 2025, Henry-Francis signed for League of Ireland Premier Division club Shelbourne on a multi-year contract. On 13 October 2025, he scored his first goal for the club, an 88th-minute winner away to Cork City at Turners Cross.

== International career ==
Henry-Francis qualifies for the Ireland through his parents; who are from Mayo and Leitrim respectively. He has represented the country at under-19 and under-21 levels.

== Career statistics ==
As of match played 30 October 2026

Appearances and goals by club, season and competition
Club	Season	League			National cup (Note: Includes FA Cup & FAI Cup)		League cup (Note: Includes EFL Cup)		Europe		Other		Total	
Club	Season	Division	Apps	Goals	Apps	Goals	Apps	Goals	Apps	Goals	Apps	Goals	Apps	Goals
Arsenal U21	2021–22	–									3 (Note: Appearances in EFL Trophy)	0	3	0
Arsenal U21	2022–23	–									4	0	4	0
Arsenal U21	2023–24	–									3	1	3	1
Arsenal U21	Total		–								10	1	10	1
Arsenal	2021–22	Premier League	0	0	0	0	0	0	–		–		0	0
Arsenal	2022–23	Premier League	0	0	0	0	0	0	0 (Note: Appearance(s) in the UEFA Europa League)	0	–		0	0
Arsenal	2023–24	Premier League	0	0	0	0	0	0	0 (Note: Appearance(s) in the UEFA Champions League)	0	–		0	0
Arsenal	2024–25	Premier League	0	0	0	0	0	0	0	0	–		0	0
Arsenal	Total		0	0	0	0	0	0	0	0	–		0	0
Sligo Rovers (loan)	2024	LOI Premier Division	11	0	2	0	–		–		–		13	0
Shelbourne	2025	LOI Premier Division	8	1	0	0	–		6 (Note: Appearance(s) in the UEFA Conference League)	0	–		14	1
Shelbourne	2026	LOI Premier Division	28	2	1	1	–		2	0	0	0	31	3
Shelbourne	Total		36	3	1	1	–		8	0	0	0	45	4
Career total			47	3	3	1	0	0	8	0	10	1	68	5
