= Odhrán Casey =

Northern Irish footballer (born 2002)

Personal information
- Date of birth: 9 April 2002 (age 24)
- Place of birth: Belfast, Northern Ireland
- Height: 1.86 m (6 ft 1 in)
- Position: Defender

Team information
- Current team: Shelbourne
- Number: 16

Youth career
- 2007–2012: Newington
- 2012–2020: Cliftonville

Senior career*
Years	Team	Apps	(Gls)
2018–2026	Cliftonville	103	(5)
2022	→ Newry City (loan)	12	(2)
2026–	Shelbourne	15	(0)

International career^{‡}
2024	Northern Ireland U21	2	(0)
- * Club domestic league appearances and goals as of 19:40, 10 November 2026 (UTC) ‡ National team caps and goals as of 14:45, 22 July 2026 (UTC)

Odhrán Casey (born 9 April 2002) is a Northern Irish professional footballer who plays as a defender for League of Ireland Premier Division club Shelbourne.

== Club career ==
=== Youth career ===
Casey joined the academy of NIFL Premiership club Cliftonville in 2012 from local side Newington, remaining at the club right up until he broke into the first team.

=== Cliftonville ===
On 26 January 2019, Casey made his senior debut for Cliftonville aged 16, in a 1–1 draw at home to Glenavon.

==== Newry City loan ====
With first-team opportunities limited during his first few seasons at senior level, Casey was loaned out to NIFL Championship side Newry City on loan until the end of the season. He scored two goals in 12 appearances during his loan spell, helping them to win the 2021–22 NIFL Championship title.

==== Return from loan ====
Casey became a first-team regular after returning from his loan spell and on 14 July 2022, he made the first European appearance of his career, coming off the bench in a 3–0 defeat to DAC Dunajská Streda in the UEFA Europa Conference League. He scored his first goal for Cliftonville on 6 December 2022 in a 2–2 draw with Coleraine in the Northern Ireland Football League Cup, before his side were defeated on penalties. On 4 May 2024, Casey was part of the side that defeated Linfield 3–1 at Windsor Park to win the 2023–24 Irish Cup, breaking his leg in the game as his club ended a 45-year wait to win the trophy.

=== Shelbourne ===
On 14 January 2026, Casey signed for League of Ireland Premier Division club Shelbourne for a record fee paid by a League of Ireland club, believed to be €115,000 plus add-ons. On 20 February 2026, in a 1–1 draw at home to Galway United in his second game for the club, Casey suffered a hamstring injury that kept him out of action until the end of June.

== International career ==
On 21 March 2024, Casey made his international debut, playing for the Northern Ireland U21 side in a 2–0 defeat to Czech Republic U21.

== Career statistics ==
As of match played on 30 October 2026

Appearances and goals by club, season and competition
Club	Season	League			National cup (Note: Includes Irish Cup & FAI Cup)		League cup (Note: Includes Northern Ireland Football League Cup)		Europe		Other		Total	
Club	Season	Division	Apps	Goals	Apps	Goals	Apps	Goals	Apps	Goals	Apps	Goals	Apps	Goals
Cliftonville	2018–19	NIFL Premiership	1	0	0	0	0	0	0 (Note: Appearances in the UEFA Europa League)	0	0	0	1	0
Cliftonville	2019–20	NIFL Premiership	1	0	0	0	0	0	0	0	0	0	1	0
Cliftonville	2020–21	NIFL Premiership	5	0	0	0	–		–		0	0	5	0
Cliftonville	2021–22	NIFL Premiership	0	0	1	0	1	0	–		0	0	2	0
Cliftonville	2022–23	NIFL Premiership	27	0	2	0	3	1	1 (Note: Appearance in the UEFA Europa Conference League)	0	0	0	33	1
Cliftonville	2023–24	NIFL Premiership	33	3	5	0	1	0	–		1 (Note: Appearances in the Scottish Challenge Cup)	0	40	3
Cliftonville	2024–25	NIFL Premiership	17	0	4	0	3	0	0 (Note: Appearances in the UEFA Conference League)	0	2 (Note: Appearances in the 2025 NIFL Premiership European Playoffs)	0	26	0
Cliftonville	2025–26	NIFL Premiership	19	2	1	0	2	0	2	0	3 (Note: Appearances in the County Antrim Shield)	0	27	2
Cliftonville	Total		103	5	13	0	10	1	3	0	6	0	135	6
Newry City (loan)	2021–22	NIFL Championship	12	2	–		–		–		–		12	2
Shelbourne	2026	LOI Premier Division	15	0	1	0	–		3	0	0	0	19	0
Career total			130	7	14	0	10	1	6	0	6	0	166	8

== Honours ==
Newry City

- NIFL Championship: 2021–22

Cliftonville

- Irish Cup: 2023–24
