= Kameron Ledwidge =

Irish footballer (born 2001)

Personal information
- Full name: Kameron Malcolm Ledwidge
- Date of birth: 7 April 2001 (age 25)
- Place of birth: Finglas, Ireland
- Position: Defender

Team information
- Current team: Shelbourne
- Number: 4

Youth career
- –2017: St. Kevin's Boys
- 2017–2021: Southampton

Senior career*
Years	Team	Apps	(Gls)
2021–	Shelbourne	170	(1)

International career
2015	Republic of Ireland U15	2	(0)
2016	Republic of Ireland U16	2	(0)
2016–2018	Republic of Ireland U17	20	(0)
2017–2018	Republic of Ireland U18	5	(0)
2019	Republic of Ireland U19	6	(0)
2019	Republic of Ireland U21	1	(0)
- * Club domestic league appearances and goals as of 19:16, 10 November 2026 (UTC)

Kameron Malcolm Ledwidge (born 7 April 2001) is an Irish footballer who plays as a defender for League of Ireland Premier Division club Shelbourne.

== Club career ==
As a youth player, Ledwidge joined the youth academy of Irish side St. Kevin's Boys. In 2017, he joined the youth academy of English Premier League side Southampton. Subsequently, he signed for Irish side Shelbourne, helping the club achieve promotion from the second tier to the top flight before winning the top flight title.

== Style of play ==
Ledwidge plays as a defender and is left-footed. English newspaper The Guardian wrote in 2017: "strong, athletic and quick across the ground, he is comfortable coming forward with the ball at this feet".

== Personal life ==
Ledwidge was born on 7 April 2001 in Finglas, Ireland. A native of Ballymun, Ireland, he enjoys fishing recreationally.

== Career statistics ==
As of match played 30 October 2026

Appearances and goals by club, season and competition
Club	Season	League			National cup (Note: Includes FAI Cup)		Europe		Other		Total	
Club	Season	Division	Apps	Goals	Apps	Goals	Apps	Goals	Apps	Goals	Apps	Goals
Southampton U21	2019–20	—			—		—		2 (Note: Appearance(s) in the EFL Trophy)	0	2	0
Shelbourne	2021	LOI First Division	8	0	0	0	—		—		8	0
Shelbourne	2022	LOI Premier Division	34	1	3	0	—		—		37	1
Shelbourne	2023	LOI Premier Division	25	0	0	0	—		0 (Note: Appearance(s) in the Leinster Senior Cup)	0	25	0
Shelbourne	2024	LOI Premier Division	33	0	3	0	4 (Note: Appearance(s) in the UEFA Conference League)	0	0	0	40	0
Shelbourne	2025	LOI Premier Division	34	0	1	0	13 (Note: 4 appearances in the UEFA Champions League; 2 appearances in the UEFA Europa League; 7 appearances in the UEFA Conference League)	0	1 (Note: Appearance(s) in the President of Ireland's Cup)	0	49	0
Shelbourne	2026	LOI Premier Division	36	0	1	0	4	0	0	0	41	0
Shelbourne	Total		170	1	8	0	21	0	1	0	198	1
Career total			170	1	8	0	21	0	3	0	200	1

== Honours ==
Shelbourne

- League of Ireland First Division: 2021
- FAI Cup runner-up: 2022
- League of Ireland Premier Division: 2024
- President of Ireland's Cup: 2025
