= Paddy Barrett =

Irish professional footballer (born 19-7-1985

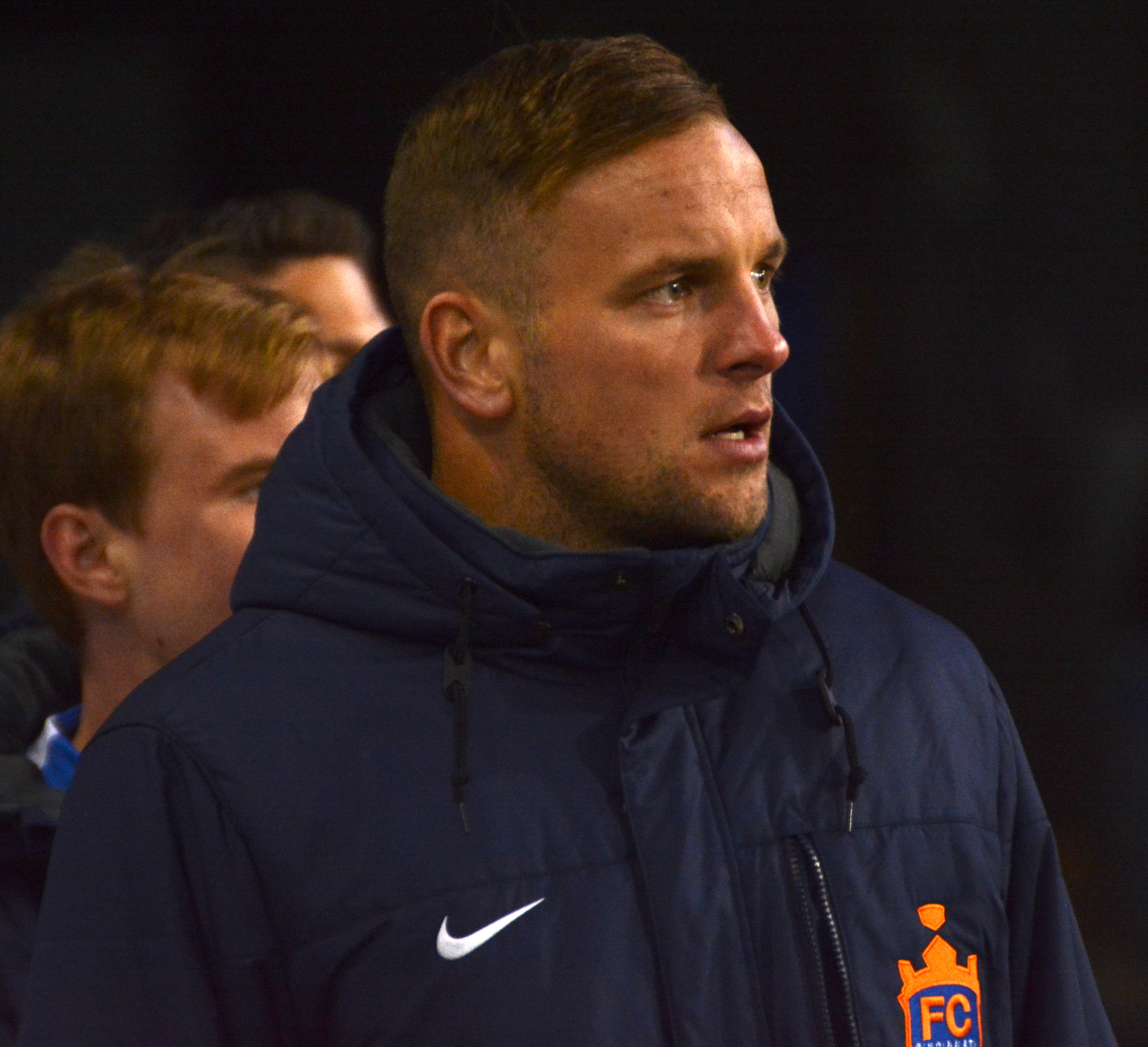
- Barrett with FC Cincinnati in 2018

Personal information
- Full name: Patrick Barrett
- Date of birth: 22 July 1993 (age 33)
- Place of birth: Larchville, Waterford, Ireland
- Height: 6 ft 0 in (1.83 m)
- Position: Defender

Youth career
- 2010: Aberdeen
- 2010–2013: Dundee United

Senior career*
Years	Team	Apps	(Gls)
2011–2014	Dundee United	0	(0)
2013	→ Waterford (loan)	11	(0)
2014	Waterford	17	(3)
2014	Galway United	11	(1)
2015–2017	Dundalk	42	(3)
2017	→ Waterford (loan)	4	(0)
2018	FC Cincinnati	16	(1)
2019–2020	Indy Eleven	41	(2)
2021	Preah Khan Reach Svay Rieng	0	(0)
2021–2022	St Patrick's Athletic	30	(0)
2023–2026	Shelbourne	94	(4)
- * Club domestic league appearances and goals as of 19:58, 10 November 2026

Patrick Barrett (born 22 July 1993) is an Irish professional footballer who plays as a defender, most recently for League of Ireland Premier Division club Shelbourne.

== Career ==
From 2013 to 2017, Barrett played for a variety of Irish clubs. On 17 November 2017 Barrett signed to FC Cincinnati in the United Soccer League to play in the 2018 season. He made his professional debut for the club in a regular season away match against Indy Eleven on 2 May 2018.

=== St Patrick's Athletic ===
==== 2021 Season ====
On 23 February 2021 Barrett returned to Ireland, signing for St Patrick's Athletic, managed by his former captain at Dundalk, Stephen O'Donnell. He made his debut for the club in the opening game of the season, a 1–1 draw away to Shamrock Rovers in a Dublin derby on 19 March 2021. He scored his first goal for the club on 23 July 2021 in a 6–0 win over Bray Wanderers in the FAI Cup, curling his shot into the top corner from 25 yards. On 28 November 2021 Barrett was in the starting XI in the 2021 FAI Cup Final, as his side defeated rivals Bohemians 4–3 on penalties following a 1–1 draw after extra time in front of a record FAI Cup Final crowd of 37,126 at the Aviva Stadium.

==== 2022 Season ====
Despite offers from other clubs and rumours of a return to Dundalk following former head coach Stephen O'Donnell, Barrett committed his future to the club by signing a long-term deal stating on the club's website, "There was plenty of interest and a lot of things I had to weigh up on holidays. I loved my first year at Pat's, it's the club where I've been at my happiest from a personal point of view, both on the field and off the field. I really enjoyed last year, and it's not something I wanted to move away from." Barrett struggled with injuries and fitness throughout the season which resulted in just 3 appearances in all competitions over the season before on 12 December 2022, it was announced that Barrett had left the club by mutual consent.

== Career statistics ==
As of match played on 9 August 2026

Appearances and goals by club, season and competition
Club	Season	League			National Cup (Note: Includes Scottish Cup, FAI Cup, U.S. Open Cup & Hun Sen Cup)		League Cup (Note: Includes Scottish League Cup & League of Ireland Cup)		Continental		Other		Total	
Club	Season	Division	Apps	Goals	Apps	Goals	Apps	Goals	Apps	Goals	Apps	Goals	Apps	Goals
Dundee United	2011–12	Scottish Premiership	0	0	0	0	0	0	0 (Note: Appearances in the UEFA Europa League)	0	—		0	0
Dundee United	2012–13	Scottish Premiership	0	0	0	0	0	0	0	0	—		0	0
Dundee United	2013–14	Scottish Premiership	0	0	0	0	0	0	—		—		0	0
Dundee United	Total		0	0	0	0	0	0	0	0	—		0	0
Waterford (loan)	2013	LOI First Division	11	0	—		—		—		—		11	0
Waterford	2014	LOI First Division	17	3	1	0	1	1	—		0 (Note: Appearances in the Munster Senior Cup)	0	19	4
Waterford	Total		28	3	1	0	1	1	0	0	0	0	30	4
Galway United	2014	LOI First Division	11	1	—		—		—		—		11	1
Dundalk	2015	LOI Premier Division	11	0	4	2	3	2	0 (Note: Appearances in the UEFA Champions League)	0	4 (Note: Appearances in the Leinster Senior Cup)	0	22	4
Dundalk	2016	LOI Premier Division	16	3	5	1	1	0	7 (Note: 6 appearances in the UEFA Champions League & 1 appearance in the UEFA Europa League)	0	3 (Note: 1 appearance in the President of Ireland's Cup & 2 appearances, 1 goal in the Leinster Senior Cup)	1	32	5
Dundalk	2017	LOI Premier Division	15	0	—		2	0	1	0	2 (Note: 1 appearance in the President of Ireland's Cup & 1 appearances in the Leinster Senior Cup)	0	20	0
Dundalk	Total		42	3	9	3	6	2	8	0	9	1	74	9
Waterford (loan)	2017	LOI First Division	4	0	1	0	—		—		—		5	0
FC Cincinnati	2018	USL Championship	16	1	1	0	—		—		2 (Note: Appearances in the USL Playoffs)	0	19	1
Indy Eleven	2019	USL Championship	28	1	2	0	—		—		3 (Note: Appearances in the USL Playoffs)	0	33	1
Indy Eleven	2020	USL Championship	13	1	—		—		—		—		13	1
Indy Eleven	Total		41	2	2	0	—		—		5	0	46	2
Preah Khan Reach Svay Rieng	2021	Cambodian Premier League	0	0	0	0	—		—		—		0	0
St Patrick's Athletic	2021	LOI Premier Division	28	0	4	1	—		—		—		32	1
St Patrick's Athletic	2022	LOI Premier Division	2	0	1	0	—		0 (Note: Appearances in the UEFA Europa Conference League)	0	0 (Note: Appearances in the President of Ireland's Cup)	0	3	0
St Patrick's Athletic	Total		30	0	5	1	—		0	0	0	0	35	1
Shelbourne	2023	LOI Premier Division	26	2	1	0	—		—		0	0	27	2
Shelbourne	2024	LOI Premier Division	31	0	0	0	—		4 (Note: Appearances in the UEFA Conference League)	0	0	0	35	0
Shelbourne	2025	LOI Premier Division	20	0	0	0	—		13 (Note: 3 appearances in the UEFA Champions League; 2 appearances in the UEFA Europa League; 8 appearances in the UEFA Conference League)	0	1	0	48	0
Shelbourne	2026	LOI Premier Division	17	2	1	0	—		3	0	0	0	21	2
Shelbourne	Total		94	4	2	0	—		20	0	1	0	131	4
Career total			266	14	21	4	7	3	28	0	15	1	351	22

== Honours ==
=== Club ===
Dundalk

- League of Ireland Premier Division (2): 2015, 2016
- FAI Cup (1): 2015
- League of Ireland Cup (1): 2017
- President of Ireland's Cup (1): 2015
- Leinster Senior Cup (1): 2015

Waterford

- League of Ireland First Division (1): 2017

FC Cincinnati

- USL Championship Eastern Conference (1): 2018

St Patrick's Athletic

- FAI Cup (1): 2021

Shelbourne

- League of Ireland Premier Division (1): 2024
- President of Ireland's Cup (1): 2025

=== Individual ===
- PFAI Premier Division Team of the Year (2): 2024, 2025
- PFAI First Division Team of the Year (1): 2014
