= Ellis Chapman =

English footballer (born 2001)

Personal information
- Full name: Ellis Darren Chapman
- Date of birth: 8 January 2001 (age 25)
- Place of birth: Lincoln, Lincolnshire, England
- Height: 6 ft 3 in (1.91 m)
- Position: Midfielder

Team information
- Current team: Derry City
- Number: 14

Youth career
- –2016: Lincoln City
- 2016–2017: Leicester City

Senior career*
Years	Team	Apps	(Gls)
2017–2020	Lincoln City	16	(0)
2019	→ Chesterfield (loan)	14	(0)
2020–2024	Cheltenham Town	51	(0)
2022–2023	→ Oldham Athletic (loan)	24	(3)
2024	→ Sligo Rovers (loan)	0	(0)
2024	Sligo Rovers	34	(9)
2025–2026	Shelbourne	37	(1)
2026–	Derry City	10	(2)
- * Club domestic league appearances and goals as of 12:11, 9 November 2026 (UTC)

Ellis Darren Chapman (born 8 January 2001) is an English professional footballer who plays as a midfielder for League of Ireland Premier Division club Derry City.

== Career ==
=== Lincoln City ===
Chapman came through the Lincoln City youth-team, before being purchased by Leicester City's Academy for an undisclosed fee in 2016. He returned to Lincoln City the following year and made the first-team bench in September 2017, at the age of 16, after impressing "Imps" manager Danny Cowley. He made his senior debut on 24 October, coming on as a 70th-minute substitute for Michael Bostwick in a 2–1 victory over Everton U23 in an EFL Trophy group stage match at Sincil Bank.

=== Cheltenham Town ===
On 15 October 2020, it was announced that Chapman had joined Cheltenham Town, with Lincoln City retaining a future financial interest in the player.

On 17 November 2022, Chapman signed for National League club Oldham Athletic on a one-month loan deal.

=== Sligo Rovers ===
On 22 December 2023, it was announced that upon the opening of the transfer window, Chapman would be loaned to League of Ireland Premier Division side Sligo Rovers until June. On 15 February 2024, he made the move permanent before he had made his competitive debut for the club.

=== Shelbourne ===
On 19 December 2024, Chapman signed for Shelbourne ahead of their 2025 season. The midfielder scored his first and only goal for the Dublin club against Galway United on 21 April 2025.

=== Derry City ===
On 3 July 2026, Chapman signed for fellow League of Ireland Premier Division club Derry City. He made his debut for the club on 9 July 2026 in a 3–2 defeat away to CSKA Sofia in the UEFA Europa League. On 8 November 2026, he was part of the starting XI in a 1–0 win over Waterford in the 2026 FAI Cup final at the Aviva Stadium.

== Style of play ==
Chapman is a midfielder with excellent passing skills and good tactical intelligence.

== Career statistics ==
As of match played 8 November 2026

Appearances and goals by club, season and competition
Club	Season	League			National Cup		League Cup		Europe		Other		Total	
Club	Season	Division	Apps	Goals	Apps	Goals	Apps	Goals	Apps	Goals	Apps	Goals	Apps	Goals
Lincoln City	2017–18	League Two	0	0	0	0	0	0	—		2 (Note: Appearance(s) in EFL Trophy)	0	2	0
Lincoln City	2018–19	League Two	5	0	1	0	2	0	—		4	0	12	0
Lincoln City	2019–20	League One	11	0	2	0	1	0	—		3	0	17	0
Lincoln City	Total		16	0	3	0	3	0	—		9	0	31	0
Chesterfield (loan)	2018–19	National League	14	0	—		—		—		—		14	0
Cheltenham Town	2020–21	League Two	21	0	2	0	0	0	—		2	0	25	0
Cheltenham Town	2021–22	League One	25	0	2	0	3	0	—		3	1	33	1
Cheltenham Town	2022–23	League One	5	0	0	0	1	0	—		3	0	9	0
Cheltenham Town	2023–24	League One	7	0	0	0	1	0	—		3	0	11	0
Cheltenham Town	Total		58	0	4	0	5	0	—		11	1	78	1
Oldham Athletic (loan)	2022–23	National League	24	3	—		—		—		1 (Note: Appearance(s) in the FA Trophy)	0	25	3
Sligo Rovers (loan)	2024	LOI Premier Division	0	0	—		—		—		—		0	0
Sligo Rovers	2024	LOI Premier Division	34	9	2	0	—		—		—		36	9
Shelbourne	2025	LOI Premier Division	27	1	1	0	—		6 (Note: 2 appearances in the UEFA Champions League; 2 appearances in the UEFA Europa League; 2 appearances in the UEFA Conference League)	0	1 (Note: Appearance in the President of Ireland's Cup)	0	35	1
Shelbourne	2026	LOI Premier Division	10	0	—		—		—		1 (Note: Appearance in the Leinster Senior Cup)	0	11	0
Shelbourne	Total		37	1	1	0	—		6	0	2	0	44	1
Derry City	2026	LOI Premier Division	10	2	5	2	—		4 (Note: Appearances in the UEFA Europa League)	1	—		19	5
Career total			193	15	15	2	8	0	10	1	23	1	249	19

== Honours ==
Lincoln City

- EFL Trophy: 2017–18

Cheltenham Town

- EFL League Two: 2020–21

Shelbourne

- President of Ireland's Cup: 2025

Derry City

- FAI Cup: 2026
