= Kerr McInroy =

Scottish footballer

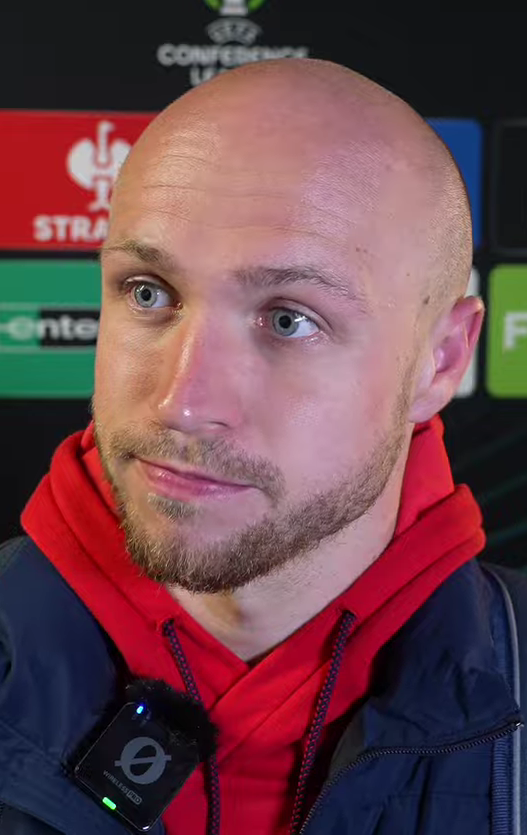
- McInroy in 2025

Personal information
- Date of birth: 31 August 2000 (age 26)
- Place of birth: Glasgow, Scotland
- Height: 5 ft 11 in (1.80 m)
- Positions: Central midfielder; attacking midfielder

Team information
- Current team: Shelbourne
- Number: 23

Youth career
- 2008–2012: Cowdenbeath
- 2012–2020: Celtic

Senior career*
Years	Team	Apps	(Gls)
2020–2022	Celtic	0	(0)
2020–2021	→ Dunfermline Athletic (loan)	16	(0)
2021–2022	→ Airdrieonians (loan)	11	(4)
2022	→ Ayr United (loan)	14	(2)
2022–2024	Kilmarnock	18	(0)
2023–2024	→ Partick Thistle (loan)	32	(4)
2025–	Shelbourne	62	(6)

International career^{‡}
2016–2017	Scotland U17	8	(0)
2017–2019	Scotland U19	16	(1)
2020	Scotland U21	1	(0)
- * Club domestic league appearances and goals as of 19:53, 10 November 2026 (UTC) ‡ National team caps and goals as of 17:00, 17 October 2020 (UTC)

Kerr McInroy (born 31 August 2000) is a Scottish footballer who plays as a midfielder for League of Ireland Premier Division club Shelbourne.

== Early and personal life ==
Born in Glasgow, McInroy grew up in Dunfermline. His grandfather is a supporter of Dunfermline Athletic and he was once a season ticket holder at the club. He attended Woodmill High School before moving to St Ninian's High School as part of Celtic's school project.

== Club career ==
=== Celtic ===
McInroy played youth football with Cowdenbeath before joining Celtic's academy at the age of 12. He became the captain of the reserve team at Celtic but suffered a torn anterior crucial ligament in May 2019, meaning he was out injured until February 2020.

He joined Dunfermline Athletic on loan in September 2020. He made his debut for the club on 6 October 2020 in a 1–0 victory over Dumbarton in the Scottish League Cup, before making his league debut on 17 October 2020 in a 3–1 victory over Inverness Caledonian Thistle.

In September 2021, McInroy joined Airdrieonians of Scottish League One on loan until January 2022. He was then loaned to Championship club Ayr United in January 2022.

=== Kilmarnock ===
On 13 June 2022, McInroy left Celtic and joined newly-promoted Scottish Premiership side Kilmarnock on a two-year deal.

On 3 August 2023, McInroy joined Scottish Championship club Partick Thistle on a season-long loan. He was released by Kilmarnock at the end of his contract in the summer of 2024.

=== Shelbourne ===
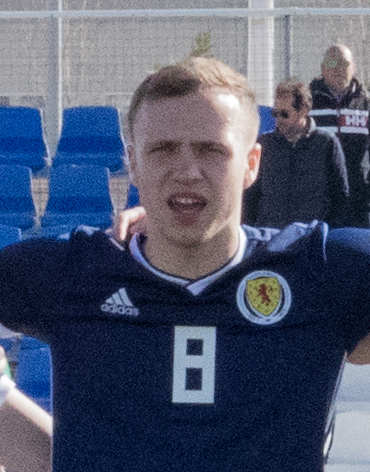
McInroy with Scotland U19 in 2019

On 23 January 2025, McInroy joined League of Ireland Premier Division club Shelbourne on a deal until the end of the season.

After establishing himself in the first team, McInroy signed a ‘multi-year’ contract with Shelbourne in April 2025.

After his first year at the club, McInroy was named as Shelbourne's Player of the Year for the 2025 season.

== International career ==
He has represented Scotland at under-17, under-19 and under-21 levels.

== Career statistics ==
As of match played 30 October 2026

Appearances and goals by club, season and competition
Club	Season	League			National cup (Note: Includes Scottish Cup, FAI Cup)		League cup (Note: Includes Scottish League Cup)		Continental		Other		Total	
Club	Season	Division	Apps	Goals	Apps	Goals	Apps	Goals	Apps	Goals	Apps	Goals	Apps	Goals
Celtic B	2017–18	—			—		—		—		1 (Note: Appearance(s) in Scottish Challenge Cup)	0	1	0
Celtic B	2018–19	—			—		—		—		1	0	1	0
Celtic B	2021–22	—			—		—		—		2	0	2	0
Celtic B	Total		—		—		—		—		4	0	4	0
Celtic	2017–18	Scottish Premiership	0	0	0	0	0	0	0	0	—		0	0
Celtic	2018–19	Scottish Premiership	0	0	0	0	0	0	0	0	—		0	0
Celtic	2020–21	Scottish Premiership	0	0	0	0	0	0	0	0	—		0	0
Celtic	2021–22	Scottish Premiership	0	0	0	0	0	0	0	0	—		0	0
Celtic	Total		0	0	0	0	0	0	0	0	—		0	0
Dunfermline Athletic (loan)	2020–21	Scottish Championship	16	0	1	0	4	0	—		1 (Note: Appearance(s) in Scottish Premiership play-offs)	0	22	0
Airdrieonians (loan)	2021–22	Scottish League One	12	4	1	0	0	0	—		0	0	13	4
Ayr United (loan)	2021–22	Scottish Championship	14	2	0	0	0	0	—		0	0	14	2
Kilmarnock	2022–23	Scottish Premiership	12	0	1	0	3	1	—		—		16	1
Kilmarnock	2023–24	Scottish Premiership	0	0	0	0	0	0	—		—		0	0
Kilmarnock	Total		12	0	1	0	3	1	—		—		16	1
Partick Thistle (loan)	2023–24	Scottish Championship	32	4	2	1	1	0	—		4 (Note: One appearance in Scottish Challenge Cup, Three appearances in Scottish Premiership play-offs)	0	39	5
Shelbourne	2025	LOI Premier Division	34	4	1	0	—		14 (Note: 4 appearances in the UEFA Champions League; 2 appearances in the UEFA Europa League; 8 appearances in the UEFA Conference League)	0	1 (Note: Appearance in the President of Ireland's Cup)	0	50	4
Shelbourne	2026	LOI Premier Division	28	2	0	0	—		4 (Note: Appearances in the UEFA Conference League)	0	0 (Note: Appearances in the Leinster Senior Cup)	0	32	2
Shelbourne	Total		62	6	1	0	—		18	0	1	0	82	6
Career total			148	16	6	1	8	1	18	0	10	0	190	18
