= Warren Davis (footballer) =

Irish footballer (born 2005)

Personal information
- Full name: Warren Davis
- Date of birth: 2 April 2005 (age 21)
- Place of birth: Tallaght, County Dublin, Ireland
- Position: Winger

Team information
- Current team: Drogheda United
- Number: 24

Youth career
- 2009–2019: Shamrock Rovers
- 2019: St Francis
- 2019: Shelbourne
- 2020–2021: UCD
- 2022: St Joseph's Boys

Senior career*
Years	Team	Apps	(Gls)
2023–	Drogheda United	106	(14)

International career^{‡}
2023	Republic of Ireland U19	2	(1)
2025	Republic of Ireland U21	2	(0)
- * Club domestic league appearances and goals as of 18:41, 10 November 2026 (UTC) ‡ National team caps and goals as of 10:59, 24 October 2026 (UTC)

Warren Davis (born 2 April 2005) is an Irish professional footballer who plays as a winger for League of Ireland First Division club Drogheda United.

== Career ==
=== Youth career ===
Tallaght, County Dublin man Davis began playing football in the academy of local club Shamrock Rovers, where he played for 10 years before being let leave after injury issues, he then had short spells at St Francis and Shelbourne in their DDSL teams, before joining UCD in 2020, playing for their under-17 side until being released in 2021, then played with St Joseph's Boys for a year.

=== Drogheda United ===
Davis signed for League of Ireland Premier Division club Drogheda United ahead of the 2023 season after impressing on trial, he was converted into a left winger by manager Kevin Doherty. He made his debut for the club on 24 February 2023, replacing Evan Weir in the 84th minute of a 1–1 draw at home to Shamrock Rovers. Davis scored his first goal in senior football on 27 February 2023, in a 4–2 loss to Usher Celtic in the Leinster Senior Cup. His first league goal for the club came on 25 September 2023, when he opened the scoring in the 7th minute of a 2–1 win away to 9-man St Patrick's Athletic at Richmond Park. In December 2023, Davis signed a 2-year contract with the club. On 15 April 2024, he signed a new 2-year contract with the club. Davis was an unused substitute in the 2024 FAI Cup final on 11 November 2024, as his side defeated Derry City 2–0 at the Aviva Stadium to win the Cup. On 16 November 2024, he helped his side to a 3–1 win over Bray Wanderers at Tallaght Stadium in the 2024 League of Ireland Premier Division Promotion/Relegation Playoff. His performances drew reported interest from EFL Championship clubs Cardiff City and Preston North End in January 2025. On 7 March 2025, he scored the only goal of the game as his side defeated Shelbourne at Tolka Park thanks to his 4th minute effort that found the top corner from just outside the corner of the box. On 17 September 2025, Davis signed a new contract with the club up to the end of the 2027 season. He scored 5 goals in 28 appearances in all competitions in 2026, as the club was relegated following a 2–1 defeat to UCD in the Promotion/Relegation Playoff.

== International career ==
On 11 October 2023, Davis made his debut at international level, coming off the bench in the 86th minute of the Republic of Ireland U19 side's 2–0 win over Scotland U19 in a friendly in San Pedro del Pinatar, Spain. 3 days later he started the friendly against Faroe Islands U19 at the same venue and scored his first international goal, in a 3–0 win for his side. On 21 May 2025, he received his first call up to the Republic of Ireland U21 side for their June friendly fixtures against Croatia U21 and Qatar U23 in Croatia. He made his debut for the U21s in a 1–0 loss to Croatia U21 on 6 June 2025.

== Personal life ==
Davis is the cousin of UFC fighter Conor McGregor. Davis' club Drogheda United released a statement in January 2025 distancing themselves from McGregor after he posted pictures on Instagram of the pair celebrating with the FAI Cup trophy in his pub, after Davis' side had recently won the trophy.

== Career statistics ==
As of match played on 23 October 2026

Appearances and goals by club, season and competition
Club	Season	League			National Cup (Note: Includes FAI Cup)		Other		Total	
Club	Season	Division	Apps	Goals	Apps	Goals	Apps	Goals	Apps	Goals
Drogheda United	2023	LOI Premier Division	19	1	2	0	1 (Note: Appearance(s) in the Leinster Senior Cup)	1	22	2
Drogheda United	2024	LOI Premier Division	28	1	3	1	5 (Note: 1 appearance in the 2024 League of Ireland Premier Division Promotion/Relegation Playoff; 4 appearances, 2 goals in the Leinster Senior Cup)	2	36	4
Drogheda United	2025	LOI Premier Division	34	7	2	0	2	0	38	7
Drogheda United	2026	LOI Premier Division	25	5	2	0	1	0	28	5
Drogheda United	Total		106	14	9	1	9	3	124	18
Career Total			106	14	9	1	9	3	124	18
