= 2023 Shelbourne F.C. season =

Shelbourne
2023 season
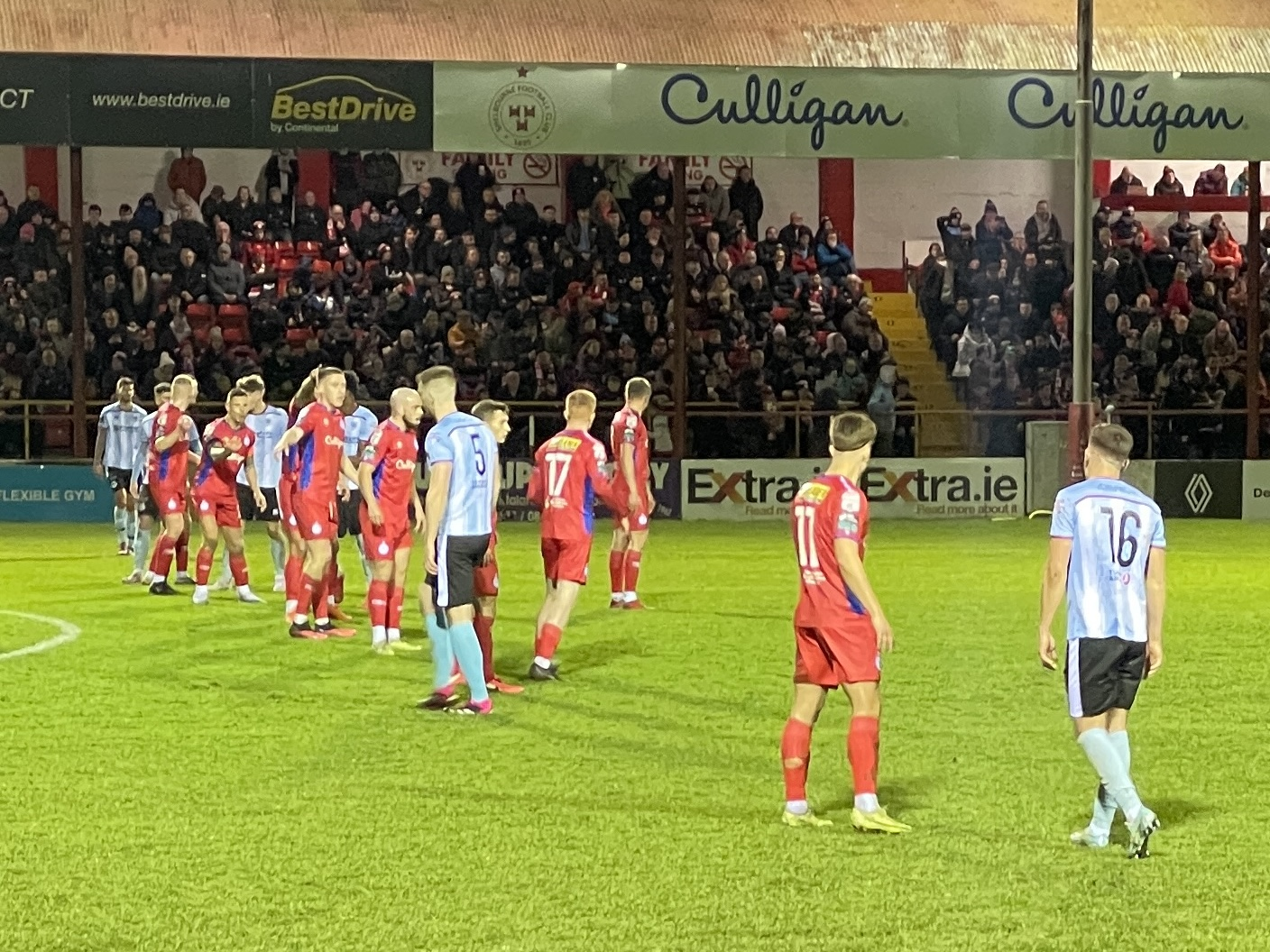
- Shelbourne at Tolka Park in February 2023
- Chairman: Andrew Doyle
- Head Coach: Damien Duff
- Stadium: Tolka Park, Dublin
- Premier Division: 4th
- FAI Cup: 1st Round
- Leinster Senior Cup: 4th round
- Top goalscorer: League: Moylan (15); All: Moylan (16)
- Highest home attendance: 4,371 v Shamrock Rovers, 10 March 2023
- Lowest home attendance: 2,300 v U.C.D., 5 May 2023
- Average home league attendance: 3,340
- Biggest win: 4-0 v U.C.D., 07 July 2023
- Biggest defeat: 0-1 v St. Patrick's Athletic, 24 February 2023
Home colours	Away colours
- All statistics correct as of 22:15 13 March 2023 (UTC).

The 2023 Shelbourne F.C. season is the club's 128th season in existence and their second back in the League of Ireland Premier Division following promotion from the League of Ireland First Division in 2021.

== First team squad ==
Players' ages are as of the opening day of the 2023 season.

#	Name	Nationality	Position	Date of birth (age)	Previous club	Signed in	Notes
Goalkeepers
1	Conor Kearns	(Republic of Ireland)	GK	6 May 1998 (aged 24)	Galway United	2023	
19	Scott van-der-Sluis	(Wales)	GK	9 January 2001 (aged 22)	Bangor City	2022	
25	Daithi Folan	(Republic of Ireland)	GK		Youth Team	2023	
Defenders
2	John Ross Wilson	(Republic of Ireland)	DF	13 December 1998 (aged 24)	Bray Wanderers	2021	
3	Conor Kane	(Republic of Ireland)	DF	11 May 1998 (aged 24)	Drogheda United	2022	
4	Andrew Quinn	(Republic of Ireland)	DF	24 January 2002 (aged 21)	Drogheda United	2023	
5	Shane Griffin	(Republic of Ireland)	DF	8 September 1994 (aged 28)	St Patrick's Athletic	2022	
13	Tyreke Wilson	(Republic of Ireland)	DF	2 December 1999 (aged 23)	Bohemians	2023	
23	Luke Byrne (c)	(Republic of Ireland)	DF	8 July 1993 (aged 29)	Shamrock Rovers	2019	
29	Paddy Barrett	(Republic of Ireland)	DF	22 July 1993 (aged 29)	St Patrick's Athletic	2023	
31	Luke Browne	(Republic of Ireland)	DF	6 October 2005 (aged 17)	Youth Team	2022	
32	Kameron Ledgewidge	(Republic of Ireland)	DF	7 April 2001 (aged 21)	Southampton	2021	
36	Lewis Temple	(Republic of Ireland)	DF	11 June 2005 (aged 17)	Youth Team	2022	
Midfielders
6	Jonathan Lunney	(Republic of Ireland)	MF	2 February 1998 (aged 24)	Bohemian	2021	
7	Brian McManus	(Republic of Ireland)	MF	29 November 2001 (aged 21)	Preston North End	2020	
8	Mark Coyle	(Republic of Ireland)	MF	13 February 1997 (aged 26)	Finn Harps	2022	
10	Jack Moylan	(Republic of Ireland)	MF	1 September 2001 (aged 21)	Bohemians	2022	
17	Shane Farrell	(Republic of Ireland)	MF	26 June 2000 (aged 22)	Finglas United	2018	
21	Gavin Molloy	(Republic of Ireland)	MF	19 October 2001 (aged 21)	Youth Team	2022	
22	Gavin Hodgins	(Republic of Ireland)	MF	5 June 2005 (aged 17)	Youth Team	2022	
27	Evan Caffrey	(Republic of Ireland)	MF	27 February 2003 (aged 19)	UCD	2023	
37	Kian Leavy	(Republic of Ireland)	MF	21 March 2002 (aged 20)	Reading	2023	On loan from Reading
	Aodh Dervin	(Republic of Ireland)	MF	21 July 1999 (aged 23)	Longford Town	2022	On loan to Longford Town
Attackers
9	Seán Boyd	(Republic of Ireland)	FW	20 June 1998 (aged 24)	Finn Harps	2022	
11	Matty Smith	(Scotland)	FW	13 March 1997 (aged 25)	Derry City	2023	
12	Jad Hakiki	(Republic of Ireland)	FW	23 June 2004 (aged 18)	Youth Team	2022	
15	Kyle Robinson	(Republic of Ireland)	FW	8 November 2002 (aged 20)	St Patrick's Athletic	2023	
Players who appeared during the 2022 season but departed before the end of the season

== Transfers ==
=== Transfers in ===
Date	Position	Nationality	Name	Previous club	Ref.
18 November 2022	GK	(Republic of Ireland)	Conor Kearns	Galway United	
18 November 2022	FW	(Republic of Ireland)	Kyle Robinson	St Patricks Athletic	
18 November 2022	DF	(Republic of Ireland)	Andrew Quinn	Drogheda United	
18 November 2022	MF	(Republic of Ireland)	Evan Caffrey	UCD	
22 November 2022	DF	(Republic of Ireland)	Tyreke Wilson	Bohemians	
3 December 2022	MF	(Republic of Ireland)	Gavin Hodges	Youth Team	
3 December 2022	DF	(Republic of Ireland)	Lewis Temple	Youth Team	
3 December 2022	DF	(Republic of Ireland)	Luke Browne	Youth Team	
17 December 2022	DF	(Republic of Ireland)	Paddy Barrett	St Patricks Athletic	

=== Loans in ===
Date	Position	Nationality	Name	Previous club	Date Ended	Ref.
8 February 2023	MF	(Republic of Ireland)	Kian Leavy	(England) Reading	June 2023	

=== Transfers out ===
Date	Position	Nationality	Name	To	Ref.
17 November 2022	GK	(Republic of Ireland)	Brendan Clarke	(Republic of Ireland) Galway United	
17 November 2022	DF	(Republic of Ireland)	Aaron O'Driscoll	Released	
17 November 2022	FW	(Trinidad and Tobago)	Dan Carr	(England) Sevenoaks Town	
17 November 2022	MF	(Republic of Ireland)	Josh Giurgi	(Republic of Ireland) Longford Town	
17 November 2022	FW	(Wales)	Dan Hawkins	Released	
15 December 2022	DF	(Republic of Ireland)	Stephan Negru	(England) Oxford United	

=== Loans out ===
Date	Position	Nationality	Name	From	Date until	Ref.
14 February 2023	MF	(Republic of Ireland)	Aodh Dervin	(Republic of Ireland) Longford Town	November 2023	

== Competitions ==
=== Overview ===
Competition	First match	Last match	Record							
Competition	First match	Last match	Pld	W	D	L	GF	GA	GD	Win %
Premier Division	17 February 2023	3 November 2023	36	15	15	6	44	27	+17	41.67
Leinster Senior Cup	24 March 2023	3 July 2023	3	2	0	1	9	4	+5	66.67
FAI Cup	21 July 2023	21 July 2023	1	0	0	1	0	1	−1	0.00
Total			40	17	15	8	53	32	+21	42.50

Source: Competitions

=== League of Ireland ===
Pos	Team	Pld	W	D	L	GF	GA	GD	Pts	Qualification or relegation
2	Derry City	36	18	11	7	57	24	+33	65	Qualification for Conference League first qualifying round
3	St Patrick's Athletic	36	19	5	12	59	42	+17	62	Qualification for Conference League second qualifying round (Note: The 2023 FAI Cup winners qualified for the Conference League second qualifying round. Since the cup winners (St Patrick's Athletic) qualified based on league position, the second Conference League first qualifying round spot was passed to the fourth-placed team.)
4	Shelbourne	36	15	15	6	44	27	+17	60	Qualification for Conference League first qualifying round
5	Dundalk	36	17	7	12	59	44	+15	58	
6	Bohemians	36	16	10	10	53	40	+13	58	

Source: SSE Airtricity League,
Rules for classification: 1) Points; 2) Goal difference; 3) Goals scored.

==== Results summary ====
Overall								Home						Away					
Pld	W	D	L	GF	GA	GD	Pts	W	D	L	GF	GA	GD	W	D	L	GF	GA	GD
36	15	15	6	44	27	+17	60	9	7	2	21	14	+7	6	8	4	23	13	+10

==== Results by matchday ====
Matchday	1	2	3	4	5	6	7	8	9	10	11	12	13	14	15	16	17	18	19	20	21	22	23	24	25	26	27	28	29	30	31	32	33	34	35	36
Ground	H	A	H	A	H	A	H	A	H	A	H	H	A	H	A	H	A	A	H	H	A	H	A	H	A	A	H	A	H	H	A	A	H	A	H	A
Result	D	L	W	L	D	W	L	D	W	D	D	W	D	W	W	L	D	D	W	D	L	D	W	D	W	D	D	W	W	W	D	L	W	D	W	W
Position	9	9	6	7	7	5	7	8	5	5	6	4	6	5	5	6	6	5	5	6	6	6	6	6	6	6	6	6	5	4	5	5	5	5	4	4

Source: extratime.ie
A = Away; H = Home; W = Win; D = Draw; L = Loss

==== Matches ====
17 February 2023 1	Shelbourne	0-0	Drogheda United	Drumcondra, Dublin
19:45 IST		Report; Highlights		Stadium: Tolka Park; Attendance: 3,424; Referee: Paul McLaughlin

24 February 2023 2	St Patrick's Athletic	1-0	Shelbourne	Inchicore, Dublin
19:45 IST		Report; Highlights		Stadium: Richmond Park; Attendance: 4,930; Referee: Neil Doyle

3 March 2023 3	Shelbourne	1-0	Bohemians	Drumcondra, Dublin
19:45 IST	Leavy 78'	Report; Highlights		Stadium: Tolka Park; Attendance: 4,250; Referee: Arnold Hunter

6 March 2023 4	Dundalk	2-1	Shelbourne	Dundalk, County Louth
19:45 IST		Report; Highlights	JR Wilson 2'	Stadium: Oriel Park; Attendance: 2,766; Referee: Damien MacGraith

10 March 2023 5	Shelbourne	0-0	Shamrock Rovers	Drumcondra, Dublin
19:45 IST		Report; Highlights		Stadium: Tolka Park; Attendance: 4,371; Referee: Paul McLaughlin

17 March 2023 6	Cork City	0-2	Shelbourne	Cork
17:00 IST		Report; Highlights	Honohan 18' (o.g.); Moylan 50'	Stadium: Turners Cross; Referee: Ray Matthews

31 March 2023 7	Shelbourne	0-1	Derry City	Drumcondra, Dublin
19:45 IST		Report; Highlights		Stadium: Tolka Park; Attendance: 3,203; Referee: Paul McLaughlin

7 April 2023 8	UCD	0-0	Shelbourne	Belfield, Dublin
19:45 IST		Report; Highlights		Stadium: UCD Bowl; Attendance: 968; Referee: Eoghan O’Shea

10 April 2023 9	Shelbourne	2-1	Sligo Rovers	Drumcondra, Dublin
19:45 IST	Smith 52'; Mahon 58' (o.g.)	Report		Stadium: Tolka Park; Attendance: 2,100; Referee: Robert Harvey

14 April 2023 10	Shamrock Rovers	2-2	Shelbourne	Tallaght, Dublin
19:45 IST		Report	Burke 18' (o.g.); Smith 51'	Stadium: Tallaght Stadium; Attendance: 6,835; Referee: Neil Doyle

21 April 2023 11	Shelbourne	1-1	Dundalk	Drumcondra, Dublin
19:45 IST	Moylan 56' (pen.)	Report		Stadium: Tolka Park; Attendance: 2,873; Referee: Damien McGraith

28 April 2023 12	Shelbourne	2-1	Cork City	Drumcondra, Dublin
19:45 IST	Smith 47'; Moylan 80'	Report		Stadium: Tolka Park; Attendance: 2,782; Referee: Ray Matthews

1 May 2023 13	Drogheda	1-1	Shelbourne	Drogheda, County Louth
17:00 IST		Report	Caffrey 69'	Stadium: Weavers Park; Attendance: 2,055; Referee: Robert Hennessy

5 May 2023 14	Shelbourne	1-0	UCD	Drumcondra, Dublin
19:45 IST	Griffin 39'	Report		Stadium: Tolka Park; Attendance: 2,319; Referee: Robert Harvey

13 May 2023 15	Sligo Rovers	0-3	Shelbourne	Sligo
19:45 IST		Report	Moylan 10'; Moylan 41'; Moylan 66' (pen.)	Stadium: The Showgrounds; Attendance: 2,431; Referee: Neil Doyle

19 May 2023 16	Shelbourne	0-1	St Patrick's Athletic	Drumcondra, Dublin
19:45 IST		Report	Curtis 56'	Stadium: Tolka Park; Attendance: 3,946; Referee: Paul McLaughlin

26 May 2023 17	Bohemians	0-0	Shelbourne	Phibsborough, Dublin
19:45 IST		Report		Stadium: Dalymount Park; Attendance: 4,500

2 June 2023 18	Derry City	0-0	Shelbourne	Derry
19:45 IST		Report		Stadium: Brandywell Stadium; Attendance: 3560; Referee: Robert Hennessy

5 June 2023 19	Shelbourne	3-2	Drogheda United	Drumcondra, Dublin
19:45 IST	Boyd 49'; Griffin 66'; Caffrey 76'		Draper 39'; Draper 90'	Stadium: Tolka Park

9 June 2023 20	Shelbourne	1-1	Sligo Rovers	Drumcondra, Dublin
19:45 IST	Smith 4'		Morahan 34'	Stadium: Tolka Park; Attendance: 2615; Referee: Robert Harvey

23 June 2023 21	St Patrick's Athletic	0-1	Shelbourne	Inchicore, Dublin
19:45 IST	Mulraney 68'			Stadium: Richmond Park; Attendance: 4754; Referee: Robert Hennessy

30 June 2023 22	Shelbourne	1-1	Derry City	Drumcondra, Dublin
19:45 IST	Boyd 57'		Doherty 69'	Stadium: Tolka Park; Attendance: 3186; Referee: Robert Harvey

7 July 2023 23	UCD	0-4	Shelbourne	Belfield, Dublin
19:45 IST			Moylan 45'; Lunney 66'; Boyd 80' (pen.) JR. Wilson 90'	Stadium: UCD Bowl; Attendance: 1074; Referee: Damien McGrath

14 July 2023 24	Shelbourne	1-1	Bohemians	Drumcondra, Dublin
19:45 IST	Moylan 56'		Afolabi 80'	Stadium: Tolka Park; Attendance: 4450; Referee: Neil Doyle

28 July 2023 25	Cork City	0-2	Shelbourne	Cork
19:45 IST			Wood 20'; Seán Boyd 73'	Stadium: Turners Cross; Attendance: 3762; Referee: David Dunne

6 August 2023 26	Dundalk	1-1	Shelbourne	Dundalk, County Louth
19:45 IST	Martin 39'		Wood 83'	Stadium: Oriel Park; Attendance: 2318

11 August 2023 27	Shelbourne	1-1	Shamrock Rovers	Drumcondra, Dublin
19:45 IST	Molloy 94'		Poom 21'	Stadium: Tolka Park; Attendance: 4250; Referee: David Dunne

26 August 2023 28	Sligo Rovers	0-1	Shelbourne	Sligo
19:45 IST			Coyle 41'	Stadium: The Showgrounds; Attendance: 2191

1 September 2023 29	Shelbourne	2-1	St Patrick's Athletic	Drumcondra, Dublin
19:45 IST	Cabral 80'; Barrett 90'		Redmond 20'	Stadium: Tolka Park; Attendance: 4325

22 September 2023 30	Shelbourne	2-1	Cork City	Drumcondra, Dublin
19:45 IST	Moylan 29'; Jarvis 46'		Keating 36' (pen.)	Stadium: Tolka Park; Attendance: 3595

25 September 2023 31	Bohemians	1-1	Shelbourne	Phibsborough, Dublin
19:45 IST	Coote 74'		Moylan 23'	Stadium: Dalymount Park; Attendance: 4390

29 September 2023 33	Shamrock Rovers	1-0	Shelbourne	Tallaght, Dublin
19:45 IST	Burke 72'			Stadium: Tallaght Stadium; Attendance: 7879

6 October 2023 34	Shelbourne	1-0	Dundalk	Drumcondra, Dublin
19:45 IST	Jarvis 4'			Stadium: Tolka Park; Attendance: 2,500 (est)

20 October 2023 34	Derry City	0-0	Shelbourne	Derry
19:45 IST		Report		Stadium: Brandywell Stadium; Attendance: 3150

27 October 2023 35	Shelbourne	3-2	UCD	Drumcondra, Dublin
19:45 IST	Moylan 20' (pen.); Moylan 65' (pen.); Moylan 88'		Raggett 50'; Kinsella-Bishop 83'	Stadium: Tolka Park; Attendance: 3446

3 November 2023 36	Drogheda United	2-4	Shelbourne	Drogheda, County Louth
19:45 IST	Rooney 31'; Foley 35'		Moylan 48'; Jarvis 54'; Moylan 63' Barrett 74'	Stadium: Weavers Park; Attendance: 2180

=== Leinster Senior Cup ===
24 March 2023 4th round	Dundalk	0-4	Shelbourne	Dundalk, County Louth
19:45	Muller (red card) 5'	Report	Moylan 8'; Robinson 35'; Caffrey 69'; Arubi 82'	Stadium: Oriel Park; Attendance: 950; Referee: Rob Harvey
Note: Shelbourne originally awarded 2-0 win as Dundalk failed to fulfill fixture. However an appeal by Dundalk was successful and a new date was arranged.

8 May 2023 Quarter-final	Shelbourne	2-0	Wexford	Drumcondra, Dublin
19:45 IST	Arubi 32'; Robinson 45'	Report		Stadium: Tolka Park; Attendance: 500; Referee: Oliver Moran

3 July 2023 Semi-final	Shelbourne	3-4	Bohemians	Drumcondra, Dublin
19:45 IST	Robinson 33', 69'; Farrell 79' (pen.)	Report	Jinadu 24'; O'Reilly 25'; Mooney 52'; Grogan 87'	Stadium: Tolka Park; Attendance: 2,109; Referee: Alan Patchell

=== FAI Cup ===
21 July 2023 2nd round	Bohemians	1-0	Shelbourne	Phibsborough, Dublin
19:45	Afolabi 32'	Report		Stadium: Dalymount Park; Attendance: 4,160; Referee: Paul McLaughlin

== Statistics ==
=== Appearances and goals ===
No	Pos	Nat	Name	League		Cups		Total	
No	Pos	Nat	Name	Apps	Goals	Apps	Goals	Apps	Goals
1	GK	(Republic of Ireland)	Conor Kearns	35	0	1	0	36	0
2	DF	(Republic of Ireland)	John Ross Wilson	22 (6)	2	1	0	23(6)	2
3	DF	(Republic of Ireland)	Conor Kane	0 (1)	0	1	0	1 (1)	0
4	DF	(Republic of Ireland)	Andrew Quinn	12 (4)	0	2 (1)	0	14 (5)	0
5	DF	(Republic of Ireland)	Shane Griffin	25 (1)	2	1	0	26 (1)	2
6	MF	(Republic of Ireland)	Jonathan Lunney	33 (2)	1	1	0	34 (2)	1
7	MF	(Republic of Ireland)	Brian McManus	1 (16)	0	1	0	2 (16)	0
8	MF	(Republic of Ireland)	Mark Coyle	23 (3)	1	2 (1)	0	25 (4)	1
9	FW	(Republic of Ireland)	Seán Boyd	5 (5)	3	1	0	6 (5)	3
10	MF	(Republic of Ireland)	Jack Moylan	34 (2)	15	2	1	36 (2)	16
11	MF	(Scotland)	Matty Smith	16 (3)	4	0 (1)	0	16 (4)	4
12	FW	(Republic of Ireland)	Jad Hakiki	5 (15)	0	2	0	7 (15)	0
13	DF	(Republic of Ireland)	Tyreke Wilson	29 (4)	0	0 (1)	0	29 (5)	0
15	DF	(Portugal)	Euclides Cabral	3 (2)	1	0	0	3 (2)	1
16	MF	(England)	Harry Wood	13 (2)	2	0 (1)	0	13 (3)	2
17	MF	(Republic of Ireland)	Shane Farrell	22 (11)	0	4	1	26 (11)	1
19	GK	(England)	Harry Fisk	1	0	1	0	1	0
21	MF	(Republic of Ireland)	Gavin Molloy	27	1	1 (1)	0	28 (1)	1
22	MF	(Republic of Ireland)	Gavin Hodgins	0	0	0 (1)	0	0 (1)	0
23	DF	(Republic of Ireland)	Luke Byrne	16 (2)	0	2	0	18 (2)	0
24	MF	(Republic of Ireland)	Sean Cummings	0	0	0 (2)	0	0 (2)	0
25	GK	(Republic of Ireland)	Daithi Folan	0	0	1	0	1	0
26	FW	(Republic of Ireland)	Gbemi Arubi	0 (8)	0	2 (1)	2	2 (9)	2
27	MF	(Republic of Ireland)	Evan Caffrey	27 (9)	2	4	1	31 (9)	3
28	DF	(Republic of Ireland)	David Toure	1 (2)	0	3	0	4 (2)	0
29	DF	(Republic of Ireland)	Paddy Barrett	25 (1)	2	1	0	26 (1)	2
32	DF	(Republic of Ireland)	Kameron Ledwidge	7 (18)	0	3 (1)	0	10 (19)	0
36	FW	(England)	Will Jarvis	10 (1)	3	0	0	10 (1)	3
16	FW	(Republic of Ireland)	Harvey Nugent	0	0	0 (1)	0	0 (1)	0
12	MF	(Republic of Ireland)	Cian Doyle	0	0	1 (1)	0	1 (1)	0
n/a	GK	(Wales)	Scott van-der-Sluis	0	0	2	0	2	0
n/a	DF	(Republic of Ireland)	Luke Browne	0	0	1 (1)	0	1 (1)	0
n/a	DF	(Republic of Ireland)	Lewis Temple	0	0	2 (1)	0	2 (1)	0
n/a	FW	(Republic of Ireland)	Kyle Robinson	2 (14)	0	3	3	5 (14)	3
n/a	MF	(Republic of Ireland)	Kian Leavy	5 (6)	1	0	0	5 (6)	1

- Players listed in italics left the club mid-season
- Source: RedsStats1895

=== Top goalscorers ===
No	Pos	Nat	Player	LOI	Cup	Total
10	FW	(Republic of Ireland)	Jack Moylan	15	1	16
11	FW	(Scotland)	Matty Smith	4	0	4
9	FW	(Republic of Ireland)	Seán Boyd	3	0	3
36	FW	(England)	Will Jarvis	3	0	3
27	MF	(Republic of Ireland)	Evan Caffrey	2	1	3
Total				44	9	53

- Players listed in italics left the club mid-season
- Source: RedsStats1985

=== Discipline ===
As of match played 17 March 2023

No	Pos	Nat	Player	LOI		FAIC		Total	
No	Pos	Nat	Player	Booked	Sent off (straight red)	Booked	Sent off (straight red)	Booked	Sent off (straight red)
13	DF	(Republic of Ireland)	Tyreke Wilson	4	0	0	0	4	0
17	MF	(Republic of Ireland)	Shane Farrell	2	0	0	0	2	0
8	MF	(Republic of Ireland)	Mark Coyle	1	0	0	0	1	0
11	MF	(Scotland)	Matty Smith	2	0	0	0	2	0
21	MF	(Scotland)	Gavin Molloy	2	0	0	0	2	0
15	FW	(Republic of Ireland)	Kyle Robinson	2	0	0	0	2	0
6	MF	(Republic of Ireland)	Jonathan Lunney	1	0	0	0	1	0
23	DF	(Republic of Ireland)	Luke Byrne	1	0	0	0	1	0
Total				15	0	0	0	15	0

- Players listed in italics left the club mid-season.
- Source: RedsStats1895

== Kit ==
The 2023 Home and Away shirts were released on 17 December 2022. Culligan replaces Hampton Homes as front of shirt sponsor in a deal running until the end of 2026.

Supplier: Umbro
Sponsor(s): Culligans (Front of Jersey)

Home	Away

Type	Shirt	Shorts	Socks	Info
Home	Red	Red	Red	Worn 5 times; against Drogheda United (LOI) H, Bohemians (LOI) H, Dundalk (LOI) A, Shamrock Rovers (LOI) H, Cork City (LOI) A
Away	Grey	Grey	Grey	Worn once; against St Patrick's Athletic (LOI) A

Key: H = Home, A = Away, N = Neutral
