= Stanley Anaebonam =

Norwegian footballer (born 1999)

Personal information
- Full name: Stanley Obinna Anaebonam
- Date of birth: 14 April 1999 (age 27)
- Height: 6 ft 3 in (1.90 m)
- Positions: Winger; forward

Youth career
- –2016: IK Start

Senior career*
Years	Team	Apps	(Gls)
2017	AFC Wulfrunians	2	(0)
2018–2020	Solihull United	27	(14)
2020	Redditch United	0	(0)
2021–2022	Shelbourne	12	(0)
2022	Truro City	6	(0)
2022	Hednesford Town	10	(2)
2022–2023	Stourbridge	19	(9)
2023	Hereford	5	(0)
2023–2024	Stourbridge	7	(0)
2024	Bromsgrove Sporting	6	(0)
2024	Stafford Rangers	10	(1)
2024–2025	Gloucester City	12	(1)
2025	Taunton Town	7	(0)
2025–2026	Stratford Town	0	(0)
2026	CS Dinamo București	9	(0)
- * Club domestic league appearances and goals as of 9 May 2026

Stanley Obinna Anaebonam (born 14 April 1999) is a Norwegian footballer who plays as a winger or a forward .

== Career ==
Anaebonam began his career in his native Norway with the youth team of IK Start, before moving to England in 2016 and featuring for Midland League Premier Division club AFC Wulfrunians during the 2017–18 season.

Anaebonam then moved to National League club Solihull Moors, but never made an appearance for the club as he predominantly featured for their academy team Solihull United in the Midland League. In October 2020, he made an appearance for Wem Town in the West Midlands (Regional) League, scoring a goal in a 2–2 draw. In January 2020, he moved to Southern League Premier Division Central club Redditch United, but was soon back at Solihull.

On 4 September 2021, Anaebonam signed for League of Ireland First Division club Shelbourne. He made three appearances as Shelbourne won the league title and earned promotion to the League of Ireland Premier Division at the first attempt since their relegation in the previous season. In November 2021, he agreed a deal to remain at the club for the 2022 season. However in July 2022, Shelbourne announced that he had left the club, after making nine substitute appearances.

After leaving Shelbourne, Anaebonam returned to England to join Southern League Premier Division South club Truro City ahead of the 2022–23 season. After spending two months at the Cornwall-based club, on 14 October 2022, Anaebonam joined Southern League Premier Division Central club Hednesford Town. He again spent just two months at Hednesford before joining league rivals Stourbridge on 11 December 2022, where he saw the remainder of the season out.

On 7 June 2023, newly promoted National League North club Rushall Olympic announced they had signed Anaebonam, but two weeks later, on 22 June 2023, he had signed for Hereford, also of the National League North. He made his debut as a substitute in the opening league fixture of the season, and his full debut in the opening home league fixture of the season. He was released by Hereford at the end of August 2023, after making five appearances.

On 5 September 2023, it was announced that Anaebonam had rejoined Stourbridge.

In March 2024, Anaebonam joined Bromsgrove Sporting.

In November 2024, Anaebonam joined Gloucester City on a non-contract basis. On 27 March 2025, he joined Taunton Town. Anaebonam left Taunton Town on conclusion of the 2025-26 season.

In June 2025, Anaebonam joined Stratford Town.

== Career statistics ==
As of end of 2024–25 season

Appearances and goals by club, season and competition
Club	Season	League			National cup (Note: Includes FAI Cup, FA Cup)		League cup		Other		Total	
Club	Season	Division	Apps	Goals	Apps	Goals	Apps	Goals	Apps	Goals	Apps	Goals
AFC Wulfrunians	2017–18	Midland League Premier Division	2	0	1	0	—		2 (Note: One appearance in JW Hunt Cup; one appearance in Birmingham Senior Cup)	0	5	0
Solihull United	2018–19	Midland League Division Two	7	5	—		—		1 (Note: Appearance(s) in Birmingham Saturday Vase)	2	8	7
Solihull United	2019–20	Midland League Division Two	20	9	—		—		6 (Note: Two appearances and one goal in Les James Challenge Cup; four appearances and six goals in Birmingham Saturday Vase)	7	26	16
Solihull United	Total		27	14	0	0	0	0	7	9	34	23
Shelbourne	2021	League of Ireland First Division	3	0	—		—		—		3	0
Shelbourne	2022	League of Ireland Premier Division	9	0	—		—		—		9	0
Shelbourne	Total		12	0	0	0	0	0	0	0	12	0
Truro City	2022–23	Southern League; Premier Division South	6	0	1	0	—		—		7	0
Hednesford Town	2022–23	Southern League; Premier Division Central	10	2	—		—		3 (Note: Two appearances and two goals in FA Trophy; one appearance in Birmingham Senior Cup)	2	13	4
Stourbridge	2022–23	Southern League; Premier Division Central	19	9	—		—		—		19	9
Hereford	2023–24	National League North	5	0	—		—		—		5	0
Stourbridge	2023–24	Southern League; Premier Division Central	7	0	3	1	—		1 (Note: Appearance(s) in FA Trophy)	0	11	1
Bromsgrove Sporting	2023–24	Southern League; Premier Division Central	6	0	—		—		—		6	0
Stafford Rangers	2024–25	Northern Premier League; Division One West	10	1	2	0	—		3	0	15	1
Gloucester City	2024–25	Southern League; Premier Division South	12	1	—		—		0	0	12	1
Taunton Town	2024–25	Southern League; Premier Division South	7	0	—		—		0	0	7	0
Career total			123	27	7	1	0	0	16	11	146	39
