= Jad Hakiki =

Irish footballer (born 2004)

Personal information
- Full name: Jad Hakiki-Filloche
- Date of birth: 23 June 2004 (age 22)
- Place of birth: Dublin, Ireland
- Height: 1.78 m (5 ft 10 in)
- Position: Midfielder

Team information
- Current team: Bohemians
- Number: 8

Youth career
- Belvedere
- –2020: Bray Wanderers
- 2020–2022: Shelbourne

Senior career*
Years	Team	Apps	(Gls)
2022–2024	Shelbourne	37	(0)
2024	Dundalk	12	(1)
2025–2026	Sligo Rovers	40	(7)
2026–	Bohemians	0	(0)

International career^{‡}
2021	Republic of Ireland U18	2	(1)
2022	Republic of Ireland U19	2	(1)
2024–2025	Republic of Ireland U21	10	(1)
- * Club domestic league appearances and goals as of 18:49, 18 November 2026 (UTC) ‡ National team caps and goals as of 14:26, 25 September 2026 (UTC)

Jad Hakiki-Filloche (born 23 June 2004) is an Irish professional footballer who plays as a midfielder for League of Ireland Premier Division club Bohemians. His previous clubs are Sligo Rovers, Shelbourne and Dundalk.

== Club career ==
=== Youth career ===
A native of Ringsend, Dublin, Hakiki began playing his schoolboy football with Belvedere, he then moved on to the academy of League of Ireland club Bray Wanderers before signing for Shelbourne's Academy in 2020.

=== Shelbourne ===
Hakiki signed his first professional contract with Shelbourne on 21 December 2021. On 12 March 2022, replacing Mark Coyle from the bench in the 70th minute of a 3–0 defeat at home to Finn Harps at Tolka Park. On 30 June 2022, he signed a new contract with the club until the end of the 2024 season. He went on to make a total of 40 appearances in all competitions for the club before departing in the summer of 2024 in search of more first team football.

=== Dundalk ===
On 1 July 2024, he signed for Dundalk to help them in their relegation fight. On 12 July 2024, he made his debut for the club, scoring his first career goal in a 4–2 victory over Drogheda United in the Louth Derby at Oriel Park. He made a total of 13 appearances in all competitions as the club were relegated to the League of Ireland First Division, finishing bottom of the table.

=== Sligo Rovers ===
On 3 December 2024, Hakiki signed for League of Ireland Premier Division club Sligo Rovers on a 2-year contract ahead of the 2025 season, claiming he was targeting a finish in the European places for the season ahead. He scored on his debut for the club on 15 February 2025 in a 3–2 loss to Waterford at The Showgrounds. Hakiki made just 6 appearances for the club in 2026 due to injuries, the last of which requiring surgery on his foot in May 2026 ruling him out for the season, with the club then relegated in his absence.

=== Bohemians ===
On 9 November 2026, it was announced that Hakiki would be joining Bohemians on a two-year contract ahead of the 2027 season.

== International career ==
As well as the Republic of Ireland, Hakiki qualifies to play for Algeria where his father is from and France where his mother is from. On 19 August 2021, Hakiki made his international debut for Republic of Ireland U18 in a 2–2 draw with Hungary U18. He scored his first international goal on 9 December 2021 in a 7–1 win over Malta U18. On 1 June 2022, he scored on his debut for the Republic of Ireland U19 side in a 3–0 win over Iceland U19. He made his Republic of Ireland U21 debut on 14 November 2024 in a 2–0 loss to Sweden U21 in Marbella, Spain. On 10 October 2025, he scored his first goal for the U21s, levelling the scores at 2–2 at home to Slovakia U21 in a 2027 UEFA European Under-21 Championship Qualifier at Turners Cross.

== Career statistics ==
As of match played on 25 April 2026

Appearances and goals by club, season and competition
Club	Season	League			National cup (Note: Includes FAI Cup)		Other		Total	
Club	Season	Division	Apps	Goals	Apps	Goals	Apps	Goals	Apps	Goals
Shelbourne	2022	LOI Premier Division	10	0	1	0	—		11	0
Shelbourne	2023	LOI Premier Division	21	0	1	0	1 (Note: Appearance(s) in the Leinster Senior Cup)	0	23	0
Shelbourne	2024	LOI Premier Division	6	0	—		0	0	0	0
Shelbourne	Total		37	0	2	0	1	0	40	0
Dundalk	2024	LOI Premier Division	12	1	1	0	—		13	1
Sligo Rovers	2025	LOI Premier Division	34	6	3	0	—		37	6
Sligo Rovers	2026	LOI Premier Division	6	1	0	0	—		6	1
Sligo Rovers	Total		40	7	3	0	—		43	7
Career total			89	8	6	0	1	0	96	8
