= Shane Farrell =

Irish footballer

Personal information
- Date of birth: 26 June 2000 (age 26)
- Place of birth: Finglas, County Dublin, Ireland
- Positions: Midfielder; utility player

Team information
- Current team: Drogheda United
- Number: 17

Youth career
- Finglas Celtic
- –2018: Finglas United

Senior career*
Years	Team	Apps	(Gls)
2018–2024	Shelbourne	148	(12)
2024–	Drogheda United	79	(8)
- * Club domestic league appearances and goals as of 18:17, 10 November 2026 (UTC)

Shane Farrell (born 26 June 2000) is an Irish professional footballer who plays as a midfielder for League of Ireland First Division club Drogheda United. He previously played for Shelbourne.

== Career ==
=== Youth career ===
A native of Finglas, County Dublin, Farrell began playing schoolboy football with local club Finglas Celtic and then Finglas United, where in his last season with the club, he scored the winner in the Dalton U19 Cup Final against Knockmitten from the penalty spot.

=== Shelbourne ===
Farrell signed for League of Ireland First Division club Shelbourne on 9 February 2018. He made his debut for the club on 23 February 2018, in a 2–1 loss away to UCD in the first game of the season at the UCD Bowl. On 25 April 2018, he scored his first goal in senior football in a 7–2 win over Drogheda United at Tolka Park in the League of Ireland Cup. He followed the goal up by scoring again 5 days later, netting the only goal of the game in a 1–0 win away to Athlone Town in the Leinster Senior Cup. Farrell signed his first professional contract with the club in August 2018. On 28 September 2018, he was part of the team that defeated rivals St Patrick's Athletic in the final in a penalty shootout to win the 2017–18 Leinster Senior Cup at Tolka Park, with Farrell scoring his penalty in the shootout. On 13 September 2019, Farrell was part of the side that defeated Drogheda United 3–1 at United Park to win the 2019 League of Ireland First Division and promotion to the Premier Division. The return to the League of Ireland Premier Division did not go to plan for Farrell or Shels, as they were relegated back to the First Division on 15 November 2020 after losing 1–0 to Longford Town at Richmond Park. On 1 October 2021, he was part of the team that defeated Treaty United 1–0 at Tolka Park to claim the 2021 League of Ireland First Division title to yo-yo the club back up to the Premier Division. On 26 November 2021, he signed a new contract with the club. Just a few months later on 22 May 2022, he signed another new contract that would run to the end of the 2023 season, with the option for another year. On 13 November 2022, he was part of the Shels side that were on the receiving end of a record FAI Cup final defeat as they were beaten 4–0 by Derry City in the 2022 FAI Cup final at the Aviva Stadium, in what he later described as "the lowest moment in my career". He signed a new contract with the club on 26 November 2023, after making 37 appearances in all competitions in the 2023 season. He made just 2 in the first half of the 2024 season, with manager Damien Duff publicly criticising Farrell's lifestyle and effort in training following a red card against Shamrock Rovers on 22 April 2024, stating "Regarding Shane, I'm always honest privately and in public. He knows he has let everyone down. I used to laugh about his diet, in year one, the chicken fillet rolls, whatever. That time has passed now. How you live your life off the pitch, how you train usually gets shown up on a match night and it did tonight. I get he's a fan's favourite and what have you, but he hasn't deserved to play - not one bit." He was allowed to depart the club when the July transfer window opened, having made 173 appearances for the club, scoring 17 goals during his 7 seasons there.

=== Drogheda United ===
On 1 July 2024, Farrell joined fellow League of Ireland Premier Division club Drogheda United. He made his debut for the club on 12 July 2024, in a 4–2 loss away to Dundalk in the Louth Derby at Oriel Park. His first goal for the club came in a 2–2 draw at home to Bohemians, as he found the top corner with a free-kick. Farrell started the 2024 FAI Cup final on 11 November 2024, as his side defeated Derry City 2–0 at the Aviva Stadium to win the Cup. On 16 November 2024, he helped his side to a 3–1 win over Bray Wanderers at Tallaght Stadium in the 2024 League of Ireland Premier Division Promotion/Relegation Playoff. On 7 December 2024, Farrell signed a new contract ahead of the 2025 season. On 3 April 2026, Farrell was admitted to hospital after a 'scary' clash of heads with Senan Mullen in a 0–0 draw with Bohemians. He scored 6 goals in 40 appearances in all competitions in 2026, as the club was relegated following a 2–1 defeat to UCD in the Promotion/Relegation Playoff.

== Career statistics ==
As of match played on 7 November 2026

Appearances and goals by club, season and competition
Club	Season	League			National Cup (Note: Includes FAI Cup)		League Cup (Note: Includes League of Ireland Cup)		Other		Total	
Club	Season	Division	Apps	Goals	Apps	Goals	Apps	Goals	Apps	Goals	Apps	Goals
Shelbourne	2018	LOI First Division	12	0	2	0	3	1	6 (Note: 4 appearances, 2 goals in the Leinster Senior Cup; 2 appearances in the 2019 League of Ireland First Division Promotion Playoffs)	2	23	3
Shelbourne	2019	LOI First Division	17	3	1	1	1	0	0 (Note: Appearance(s) in the Leinster Senior Cup)	0	19	4
Shelbourne	2020	LOI Premier Division	11	0	1	0	—		1 (Note: Appearance in the League of Ireland Promotion/Relegation Play-off)	0	13	0
Shelbourne	2021	LOI First Division	24	3	1	0	—		—		25	3
Shelbourne	2022	LOI Premier Division	34	6	5	0	—		—		39	6
Shelbourne	2023	LOI Premier Division	33	0	1	0	—		3	1	37	1
Shelbourne	2024	LOI Premier Division	17	0	—		—		0	0	17	0
Shelbourne	Total		148	12	11	1	4	1	10	3	173	17
Drogheda United	2024	LOI Premier Division	11	1	4	0	—		1 (Note: 1 appearance in the 2024 League of Ireland Premier Division Promotion/Relegation Playoff)	0	16	1
Drogheda United	2025	LOI Premier Division	35	2	3	0	—		4 (Note: 1 appearance in the President of Ireland's Cup; 3 appearances in the Leinster Senior Cup)	0	42	2
Drogheda United	2026	LOI Premier Division	33	5	3	0	—		4 (Note: 1 appearance in the 2026 League of Ireland play-offs; 3 appearances, 1 goal in the Leinster Senior Cup)	1	40	6
Drogheda United	Total		79	8	10	0	—		9	1	98	9
Career Total			227	20	21	1	4	1	19	4	271	26
