= Andrew Quinn (footballer) =

Irish footballer (born 2002)

Personal information
- Full name: Andrew Quinn
- Date of birth: 24 January 2002 (age 24)
- Place of birth: Dunshaughlin, County Meath, Republic of Ireland
- Height: 1.88 m (6 ft 2 in)
- Position: Defender

Team information
- Current team: Drogheda United
- Number: 4

Youth career
- 2018–2021: Dundalk

Senior career*
Years	Team	Apps	(Gls)
2020–2021	Dundalk	1	(0)
2021	→ Bray Wanderers (loan)	24	(1)
2022	Drogheda United	30	(0)
2023	Shelbourne	16	(0)
2024–	Drogheda United	79	(2)
- * Club domestic league appearances and goals as of 21:24, 11 June 2026 (UTC)

Andrew Quinn (born 24 January 2002) is an Irish professional footballer who plays as a defender for League of Ireland First Division club Drogheda United. His previous clubs are Dundalk, Bray Wanderers and Shelbourne.

== Career ==
=== Youth career ===
Dunshaughlin, County Meath man Quinn signed for the academy of League of Ireland club Dundalk in 2018, initially playing with their under-17 side before working his way through the ranks up to first team level,

=== Dundalk ===
Quinn made his senior debut for Dundalk on 27 September 2020, in a 4–0 defeat at home to Shamrock Rovers at Oriel Park in what proved to be his only senior appearance for the club.

==== Bray Wanderers loan ====
On 22 February 2021, it was announced that Quinn had signed for League of Ireland First Division club Bray Wanderers on loan until the end of the season. He made his debut for the club on 2 April 2021 in a 3–3 draw away to Shelbourne at Tolka Park in the opening game of the season. On 9 July 2021, he scored the first senior goal of his career, a 94th-minute equaliser in a 2–2 draw away to Cork City at Turners Cross. He made 28 appearances in all competitions during his loan spell with the club.

=== Drogheda United ===
On 18 December 2021, he signed for Louth rivals Drogheda United ahead of the 2022 season. He made his debut on 25 February 2022 in a 2–0 defeat at home to Shelbourne. He made 32 appearances in all competitions during the season.

=== Shelbourne ===
On 18 November 2022, Quinn signed for Shelbourne for the 2023 season. He made his debut for the club on 6 March 2023, in a 2–1 defeat away to his former club Dundalk at Oriel Park. He made 19 appearances for the club in all competitions before departing at the end of the season in search of more regular game time.

=== Return to Drogheda United ===
In December 2023, Quinn returned to Drogheda United. He scored his first goal for the club on 16 March 2024, in a 3–1 defeat away to Sligo Rovers at The Showgrounds. On 10 November 2024, Quinn opened the scoring in the 2024 FAI Cup final with a back post volley to help his side on their way to a 2–0 win over Derry City at the Aviva Stadium. On 16 November 2024, he helped his side to a 3–1 win over Bray Wanderers at Tallaght Stadium in the 2024 League of Ireland Premier Division Promotion/Relegation Playoff. Quinn signed a new contract with the club on 8 December 2024. On 7 February 2025, he featured in his side's 2–0 loss to former club Shelbourne in the 2025 President of Ireland's Cup. He scored 1 goal in 33 appearances in all competitions in 2026, as the club was relegated following a 2–1 defeat to UCD in the Promotion/Relegation Playoff.

== International career ==
Quinn was called up to the Republic of Ireland U21 team for their game away to Montenegro U21 on 12 October 2021, but was not capped.

== Career statistics ==
As of match played on 8 November 2026

Appearances and goals by club, season and competition
Club	Season	League			National Cup (Note: Includes FAI Cup)		Europe		Other		Total	
Club	Season	Division	Apps	Goals	Apps	Goals	Apps	Goals	Apps	Goals	Apps	Goals
Dundalk	2020	LOI Premier Division	1	0	0	0	0 (Note: Apprarance(s) in the UEFA Europa League)	0	—		1	0
Bray Wanderers (loan)	2021	LOI First Division	24	1	1	0	—		3 (Note: Appearances in the 2021 League of Ireland Premier Division Promotion/Relegation Playoff)	0	28	1
Drogheda United	2022	LOI Premier Division	30	0	2	0	—		—		32	0
Shelbourne	2023	LOI Premier Division	16	0	1	0	—		2 (Note: Appearance(s) in the Leinster Senior Cup)	0	19	0
Drogheda United	2024	LOI Premier Division	27	2	5	2	—		4 (Note: 1 appearance in the 2024 League of Ireland Premier Division Promotion/Relegation Playoff; 3 appearances in the Leinster Senior Cup)	0	36	4
Drogheda United	2025	LOI Premier Division	33	0	3	2	—		3 (Note: 1 appearance in the President of Ireland's Cup; 2 appearances in the Leinster Senior Cup)	0	39	2
Drogheda United	2026	LOI Premier Division	28	1	2	0	—		3 (Note: 1 appearance in the 2026 League of Ireland play-offs; 2 appearances in the Leinster Senior Cup)	0	33	1
Drogheda United	Total		88	3	10	4	—		10	0	108	7
Career Total			159	4	14	4	0	0	15	0	188	8

== Honours ==
=== Club ===
Drogheda United

- FAI Cup: 2024

=== Individual ===
- Drogheda United Supporters Player of the Year: 2025
- Drogheda United Goal of the Season: 2025 (vs. Shamrock Rovers)
