= Jonathan Lunney =

Irish footballer

Jonathan "JJ" Lunney
Personal information
- Date of birth: 2 February 1998 (age 28)
- Place of birth: Swords, County Dublin, Ireland
- Position: Midfielder

Team information
- Current team: Shelbourne
- Number: 6

Youth career
- –2014: Malahide United
- 2014–2016: Preston North End
- 2016: St Patrick's Athletic

Senior career*
| Years | Team | Apps | (Gls) |
| 2016–2017 | St Patrick's Athletic | 25 | (1) |
| 2018 | Bohemians | 21 | (2) |
| 2019 | Waterford | 33 | (1) |
| 2020 | Bohemians | 13 | (0) |
| 2021– | Shelbourne | 170 | (5) |

International career^{‡}
| 2013 | Republic of Ireland U15 | | |
| 2013–2014 | Republic of Ireland U16 | 8 | (0) |
| 2014–2015 | Republic of Ireland U17 | 11 | (0) |
| 2016 | Republic of Ireland U18 | 8 | (0) |
| 2016–2017 | Republic of Ireland U19 | 3 | (0) |
- * Club domestic league appearances and goals as of 19:22, 10 November 2026 (UTC) ‡ National team caps and goals as of 20:27, 26 February 2025 (UTC)

Jonathan "JJ" Lunney (born 2 February 1998) is an Irish professional footballer who plays as a midfielder for League of Ireland Premier Division club Shelbourne. His previous clubs are St Patrick's Athletic, Bohemians and Waterford.

== Career ==
=== Youth career ===
Lunney grew up in Swords, County Dublin and began playing with Malahide United, from there he joined the academy of EFL Championship club Preston North End in 2014, before returning home to the under-19 side of League of Ireland club St Patrick's Athletic in 2016.

=== St Patrick's Athletic ===
Lunney made his first team debut for St Patrick's Athletic on 21 October 2016, replacing the injured Lee Desmond from the bench in the 21st minute of a 3–1 defeat away to Cork City at Turners Cross. His performance in that game earned him his first senior start 4 days later, in a 5–2 win over champions Dundalk at Richmond Park, with Lunney scoring the first goal of his career when he found the top corner for 25 yards Tim the 86th minute. On 17 September 2016, he was an unused substitute in the 2016 League of Ireland Cup final as his side defeated Limerick 4–1 at the Markets Field. He got a lot more game time in the 2017 season, making 28 appearances in all competitions in his first full season at senior level.

=== Bohemians ===
On 24 November 2017, Lunney signed for Dublin rivals Bohemians. He scored his first goal for the club on 2 April 2018, an 83rd-minute penalty in a 2–2 draw with UCD in the League of Ireland Cup which his side won after a penalty shootout. He scored five goals in 31 appearances in all competitions during the season.

=== Waterford ===
On 30 October 2018, Lunney signed for League of Ireland Premier Division club Waterford for the 2019 season. He scored 1 goal in 38 appearances in all competitions during his time with the club.

=== Return to Bohemians ===
On 27 November 2019, Lunney returned to Bohemians after a season in absence. On 27 August 2020, he made his first appearance in European football, as his side were beaten in a penalty shootout away to Hungarian club Fehérvár after a 0–0 draw in the UEFA Europa League.

=== Shelbourne ===
On 3 December 2020, Lunney signed for League of Ireland First Division club Shelbourne. On 1 October 2021, the team defeated Treaty United 1–0 at Tolka Park to claim the 2021 League of Ireland First Division title to gain promotion to the League of Ireland Premier Division. On 16 June 2022, he extended his contract until the end of 2023. On 13 November 2022, he was part of the side that were on the receiving end of a record FAI Cup final defeat as they were beaten 4–0 by Derry City at the Aviva Stadium in the 2022 FAI Cup final at the Aviva Stadium. On 20 July 2023, he signed a new contract with the club. On 21 November 2024, he signed a new 3-year contract with the club.

== International career ==
Lunney has represented the Republic of Ireland at U15, U16, U17, U18 and U19 level.

== Career statistics ==
As of match played on 30 October 2026

Appearances and goals by club, season and competition
| Club | Season | League | | | National Cup (Note: Includes FAI Cup) | | League Cup (Note: Includes League of Ireland Cup) | | Europe | | Other | | Total | |
| Club | Season | Division | Apps | Goals | Apps | Goals | Apps | Goals | Apps | Goals | Apps | Goals | Apps | Goals |
|---|---|---|---|---|---|---|---|---|---|---|---|---|---|---|
| St Patrick's Athletic | 2016 | LOI Premier Division | 3 | 1 | 1 | 0 | 0 | 0 | 0 (Note: Apprarance(s) in the UEFA Europa League) | 0 | 0 (Note: Appearance(s) in the Leinster Senior Cup) | 0 | 4 | 1 |
| St Patrick's Athletic | 2017 | LOI Premier Division | 22 | 0 | 1 | 0 | 2 | 0 | — | | 3 | 0 | 28 | 0 |
| St Patrick's Athletic | Total | | 25 | 1 | 1 | 0 | 2 | 0 | 0 | 0 | 3 | 0 | 31 | 1 |
| Bohemians | 2018 | LOI Premier Division | 21 | 2 | 5 | 1 | 3 | 1 | — | | 2 (Note: 1 appearance in the Scottish Challenge Cup; 1 appearance, 1 goal in the Leinster Senior Cup) | 1 | 31 | 5 |
| Waterford | 2019 | LOI Premier Division | 33 | 1 | 2 | 0 | 1 | 0 | — | | 2 (Note: Appearance(s) in the Scottish Challenge Cup) | 0 | 38 | 1 |
| Bohemians | 2020 | LOI Premier Division | 13 | 0 | 1 | 0 | — | | 1 | 0 | — | | 15 | 0 |
| Shelbourne | 2021 | LOI First Division | 20 | 0 | 1 | 0 | — | | — | | — | | 21 | 0 |
| Shelbourne | 2022 | LOI Premier Division | 25 | 2 | 5 | 0 | — | | — | | — | | 30 | 2 |
| Shelbourne | 2023 | LOI Premier Division | 35 | 1 | 1 | 0 | — | | — | | 0 | 0 | 36 | 1 |
| Shelbourne | 2024 | LOI Premier Division | 31 | 0 | 2 | 0 | — | | 4 (Note: Appearance(s) in the UEFA Conference League) | 0 | 0 | 0 | 37 | 0 |
| Shelbourne | 2025 | LOI Premier Division | 35 | 1 | 1 | 0 | — | | 13 (Note: 4 appearances in the UEFA Champions League; 2 appearances in the UEFA Europa League; 7 appearances in the UEFA Conference League) | 0 | 1 (Note: Appearance in the President of Ireland's Cup) | 0 | 50 | 1 |
| Shelbourne | 2026 | LOI Premier Division | 24 | 1 | 0 | 0 | — | | 3 | 0 | 0 | 0 | 27 | 1 |
| Shelbourne | Total | | 170 | 5 | 10 | 0 | — | | 20 | 0 | 1 | 0 | 198 | 5 |
| Career Total | | | 262 | 5 | 19 | 1 | 6 | 1 | 21 | 0 | 9 | 1 | 317 | 8 |

== Honours ==
St Patrick's Athletic

- League of Ireland Cup (1): 2016

Shelbourne

- League of Ireland Premier Division (1): 2024
- League of Ireland First Division (1): 2021
- President of Ireland's Cup (1): 2025
