= 2024 FAI Cup final =

- Event: 2024 FAI Cup
Drogheda United	Derry City
2	0
- Date: 10 November 2024
- Venue: Aviva Stadium, Dublin
- Man of the Match: Elicha Ahui (Drogheda United)
- Referee: Rob Harvey
- Attendance: 38,723

The 2024 FAI Cup final, known as the 2024 Sports Direct FAI Cup final for sponsorship reasons, was the final match of the 2024 FAI Cup, the national association football cup of the Republic of Ireland. The match took place on Sunday 10 November 2024 at the Aviva Stadium in Dublin, between Drogheda United and Derry City.

Drogheda won the game 2-0 to win the FAI Cup for the second time in their history.

== Route to the final ==
Drogheda United		Round	Derry City	
Opponent	Score	Round	Opponent	Score
Dundalk	2–1 (H)	Second round	St Patrick's Athletic	3–0 (H)
Wilton United	9–0 (H)	Third round	Cork City	1–0 (A)
Athlone Town	4–1 (A)	Quarter-finals	Shelbourne	2–0 (H)
Wexford	3–2 (H)	Semi-finals	Bohemians	2–0 (A)
Note: In all results above, the score of the finalist is given first (H: home; A: away).

== Match ==
=== Summary ===
In the 37th minute, Andrew Quinn put Drogheda into the lead when he scored with a low finish at the back post to the left of the net after a free-kick from the right by Shane Farrell. In the 58th minute, Conor Kane was fouled by Ronan Boyce in the penalty area and Drogheda were awarded a penalty. Douglas James-Taylor scored the penalty with a finish to the right of the net sending the goalkeepr the wrong way to make it 2-0 to Drogheda which ended up as the final score with Drogheda winning the FAI Cup for the second time in their history.

=== Details ===
10 November 2024
15:00

Drogheda United	2–0	Derry City
Quinn 37'; James-Taylor 58' (pen.)	Report

Aviva Stadium, Dublin
Attendance: 38,723
Referee: Robert Harvey

Drogheda United	Derry City

GK	36	(United States) Luke Dennison
RB	2	(England) Elicha Ahui
CB	4	(Republic of Ireland) Andrew Quinn	37'
CB	15	(Republic of Ireland) David Webster
CB	18	(Republic of Ireland) James Bolger
LB	23	(Republic of Ireland) Conor Kane
CM	17	(Republic of Ireland) Shane Farrell	(substituted off) 73'
CM	19	(Republic of Ireland) Ryan Brennan (c)	(yellow card) 45+3'	(substituted off) 90+3'
AM	7	(Republic of Ireland) Darragh Markey
ST	10	(England) Douglas James-Taylor	58' (pen.)
ST	9	(Haiti) Frantz Pierrot	(yellow card) 67'	(substituted off) 68'
Substitutes:
GK	1	(Republic of Ireland) Andrew Wogan
CB	5	(England) Aaron Harper-Bailey
CB	6	(Republic of Ireland) Jack Keaney
CM	8	(Republic of Ireland) Gary Deegan	(substituted on) 90+3'
RW	11	(Republic of Ireland) Adam Foley	(substituted on) 68'	(yellow card) 90+2'
CM	21	(Republic of Ireland) Luke Heeney	(substituted on) 73'
LB	22	(Republic of Ireland) Aaron McNally
LW	24	(Republic of Ireland) Warren Davis
ST	25	(Republic of Ireland) Bridel Bosakani
Manager:
(Republic of Ireland) Kevin Doherty

GK	1	(Republic of Ireland) Brian Maher
RB	2	(Republic of Ireland) Ronan Boyce	(substituted off) 65'
CB	16	(Republic of Ireland) Shane McEleney	(yellow card) 70'
CB	6	(Republic of Ireland) Mark Connolly	(yellow card) 89'
LB	20	(England) Andre Wisdom	(substituted off) 82'
CM	15	(England) Sadou Diallo
CM	28	(Republic of Ireland) Adam O'Reilly		(yellow card) 84'
CM	10	(Northern Ireland) Patrick McEleney (c)	(substituted off) 45+4'
RW	12	(Scotland) Paul McMullan		(substituted off) 57'
ST	21	(Scotland) Danny Mullen		(substituted off) 56'
LW	7	(Republic of Ireland) Michael Duffy
Substitutes:
CM	8	(England) Will Patching	(substituted on) 45+4'
ST	9	(Republic of Ireland) Patrick Hoban	(substituted on) 65'
ST	11	(Republic of Ireland) Colm Whelan	(substituted on) 56'
CM	19	(England) Jacob Davenport	(substituted on) 82'
CB	25	(England) Duncan Idehen
GK	26	(Republic of Ireland) Tadhg Ryan
RB	29	(England) Sean Robertson	(substituted on) 57'
CM	34	(Republic of Ireland) Callum Doherty
CB	39	(Northern Ireland) Conor Barr
Manager:
(Northern Ireland) Ruaidhrí Higgins
