= Conor Kane (footballer) =

Irish footballer

Personal information
- Full name: Conor Kane
- Date of birth: 5 November 1998 (age 28)
- Place of birth: Palmerstown, County Dublin, Republic of Ireland
- Position: Left back

Team information
- Current team: Drogheda United
- Number: 3

Youth career
- Cherry Orchard
- St Kevin's Boys
- 2015–2016: St Patrick's Athletic

Senior career*
Years	Team	Apps	(Gls)
2016	St Patrick's Athletic	0	(0)
2017–2021	Drogheda United	120	(1)
2022–2023	Shelbourne	28	(0)
2023	→ Drogheda United (loan)	10	(0)
2024–	Drogheda United	97	(1)

International career^{‡}
2016	Republic of Ireland U18	1	(0)
2016–2017	Republic of Ireland U19	5	(0)
- * Club domestic league appearances and goals as of 17:43, 10 November 2026 (UTC) ‡ National team caps and goals as of 10:30, 28 January 2025 (UTC)

Conor Kane (born 5 November 1998) is an Irish professional footballer who plays as a left back for League of Ireland Premier Division club Drogheda United. His previous clubs are St Patrick's Athletic and Shelbourne.

== Career ==
=== Youth career ===
Raised in Palmerstown, County Dublin, Kane played for top Dublin schoolboy clubs Cherry Orchard and St Kevin's Boys before signing for the academy of League of Ireland club St Patrick's Athletic in 2015, where he played with the under 17 and under 19 sides over 2 seasons.

=== St Patrick's Athletic ===
On 21 May 2016, Kane made his senior debut for St Patrick's Athletic, replacing club captain Ger O'Brien from the bench at half time in an 8–0 victory over Pike Rovers at Richmond Park in the Second Round of the FAI Cup in what proved to be his only senior appearance for the club.

=== Drogheda United ===
Kane signed for League of Ireland Premier Division club Drogheda United in November 2016 ahead of their 2017 campaign. He made his debut for the club on 13 March 2017 in a 2–1 loss to Bray Wanderers at the Carlisle Grounds. Kane made 25 appearances in all competitions in his first full season in senior football, but the season was less successful for his team as they were relegated to the League of Ireland First Division on 29 September 2017 following a 2–1 loss to Derry City at Maginn Park. On 20 October 2020, Kane scored the first senior goal of his career with a long range strike in a 3–1 win away to Galway United at Eamonn Deacy Park. He was named in three 2018 PFAI First Division Team of the Year by his fellow players. After losing out in the Promotion Playoffs in 2018 and 2019, Kane and Drogheda earned promotion at the third time of asking, by winning the 2020 League of Ireland First Division title on 27 October 2020, following a 2–0 win away to Cabinteely at Stradbrook Road. He was named in the PFAI First Division Team of the Year for 2020 by his fellow professionals in the league. On 17 November 2020, he signed a new 1-year contract with the club. He made 32 appearances in all competitions in his side's first season back in the top flight as they avoided the Promotion/Relegation Playoff by 2 points.

=== Shelbourne ===
On 15 December 2021, Kane signed for newly promoted club Shelbourne for the 2022 season under newly appointed manager Damien Duff after the two clubs eventually agreed a compensation fee for Kane. On 2 September 2022, Kane suffered a serious knee injury in a 0–0 draw away to Dundalk at Oriel Park, with the injury keeping him out of action for a long term spell. The injury would see him miss out on the 2022 FAI Cup final as his side were on the receiving end of a record FAI Cup final defeat of 4–0 to Derry City at the Aviva Stadium.

=== Return to Drogheda United ===
Struggling for game time following his injury, Kane joined his former club Drogheda United on an initial loan until the end of the season on 29 July 2023. He made 12 appearances in all competitions during his loan spell with the club. On 14 December 2023, he returned to the club on a permanent basis, signing a new contract for the 2024 season. On 23 August 2024, he scored the second goal of his career, in a 7–0 win at home to Sligo Rovers. Kane started the 2024 FAI Cup final on 11 November 2024, as his side defeated Derry City 2–0 at the Aviva Stadium to win the Cup. On 16 November 2024, he helped his side to a 3–1 win over Bray Wanderers at Tallaght Stadium in the 2024 League of Ireland Premier Division Promotion/Relegation Playoff. On 4 December 2024, he extended his contract with the club. He made 40 appearances in all competitions in 2026, as the club was relegated following a 2–1 defeat to UCD in the Promotion/Relegation Playoff.

== International career ==
On 27 March 2016, Kane made his international debut for the Republic of Ireland U18 team in a 4–1 defeat to the England U18s. His Republic of Ireland U19 debut came on 6 September 2016, in a 3–1 win over Austria U19 at Tallaght Stadium.

== Career statistics ==
As of match played on 8 November 2026

Appearances and goals by club, season and competition
Club	Season	League			National Cup (Note: Includes FAI Cup)		League Cup (Note: Includes League of Ireland Cup)		Europe		Other		Total	
Club	Season	Division	Apps	Goals	Apps	Goals	Apps	Goals	Apps	Goals	Apps	Goals	Apps	Goals
St Patrick's Athletic	2016	LOI Premier Division	0	0	1	0	0	0	0 (Note: Apprarance(s) in the UEFA Europa League)	0	0 (Note: Appearance(s) in the Leinster Senior Cup)	0	1	0
Drogheda United	2017	LOI Premier Division	21	0	3	0	1	0	—		0	0	25	0
Drogheda United	2018	LOI First Division	24	0	2	0	0	0	—		5 (Note: 4 appearances in the 2018 League of Ireland First Division Promotion Playoffs; 1 appearance in the Leinster Senior Cup)	0	31	0
Drogheda United	2019	LOI First Division	26	0	2	0	1	0	—		4 (Note: Appearances in the 2019 League of Ireland First Division Promotion Playoffs)	0	33	0
Drogheda United	2020	LOI First Division	18	1	1	0	—		—		—		19	1
Drogheda United	2021	LOI Premier Division	31	0	1	0	—		—		—		32	0
Drogheda United	Total		120	1	9	0	2	0	—		9	0	140	1
Shelbourne	2022	LOI Premier Division	27	0	2	0	—		—		—		29	0
Shelbourne	2023	LOI Premier Division	1	0	0	0	—		—		1	0	2	0
Shelbourne	Total		28	0	2	0	—		—		1	0	31	0
Drogheda United (loan)	2023	LOI Premier Division	10	0	2	0	—		—		—		12	0
Drogheda United	2024	LOI Premier Division	26	1	5	0	—		—		3 (Note: 1 appearance in the 2024 League of Ireland Premier Division Promotion/Relegation Playoff; 2 appearances in the Leinster Senior Cup)	0	34	1
Drogheda United	2025	LOI Premier Division	36	0	3	0	—		—		3 (Note: 1 appearance in the President of Ireland's Cup; 2 appearances in the Leinster Senior Cup)	0	42	0
Drogheda United	2026	LOI Premier Division	35	0	2	0	—		—		3 (Note: 1 appearance in the 2026 League of Ireland play-offs; 2 appearances in the Leinster Senior Cup)	0	40	0
Drogheda United	Total		97	1	10	0	—		—		9	0	116	1
Career Total			255	2	24	0	2	0	0	0	19	0	300	2

== Honours ==
=== Club ===
Drogheda United

- League of Ireland First Division: 2020
- FAI Cup: 2024

=== Individual ===
- PFAI First Division Team of the Year: 2018, 2020
