= Lewis Temple (footballer) =

Irish footballer (born 2005)

Personal information
- Full name: Lewis John Temple
- Date of birth: 11 June 2005 (age 21)
- Place of birth: Bray, Ireland
- Height: 1.91 m (6 ft 3 in)
- Position: Defender

Team information
- Current team: Oldham Athletic (on loan from Bolton Wanderers)
- Number: 24

Youth career
- 2020–2021: Bray Wanderers
- 2022–2024: Shelbourne

Senior career*
Years	Team	Apps	(Gls)
2022–2026	Shelbourne	13	(0)
2023	→ Longford Town (loan)	14	(0)
2024	→ Wexford (loan)	14	(1)
2026–	Bolton Wanderers	0	(0)
2026–	→ Oldham Athletic (loan)	4	(0)

International career
2023	Republic of Ireland U19	5	(0)
- * Club domestic league appearances and goals as of 15:05, 2 December 2025

Lewis John Temple (born 11 June 2005) is an Irish professional footballer who plays as a defender for Oldham Athletic on loan from EFL Championship club Bolton Wanderers.

== Club career ==
=== Youth career ===
A native of Bray, County Wicklow, Temple played youth football for his local club Bray Wanderers. He played for their under-15 team in 2020, then graduated to their under-17 side in 2021 before moving to Shelbourne's academy in 2022.

=== Shelbourne ===
Temple's first involvement with the Shelbourne first team came when he appeared in both the First Round of the 2022 FAI Cup on 29 July 2022, being introduced as a second-half substitute against his former club Bray Wanderers.

==== Longford Town loan ====
On 6 July 2023, Temple joined League of Ireland First Division club Longford Town on loan until the end of the season. He made 15 appearances in all competitions during his loan spell with the club. After impressing on his loan with Longford, Temple signed a new two-year contract with Shelbourne in February 2024.

==== Wexford loan ====
He joined Wexford on loan for the second half of their First Division season in 2024. Temple scored his first professional goal in a 2–1 win against Athlone Town at Ferrycarrig Park on 30 August 2024. He went on to make 20 appearances as the club reached the promotion and relegation play-off semi-final and the 2024 FAI Cup semi-final.

==== Return from loan ====
Temple found himself given more first-team opportunities for Shelbourne in 2025 following injuries to Paddy Barrett and Sam Bone. In his third start of the season on 4th April he was awarded the player of the match award against St Patrick's Athletic. Shelbourne manager Damien Duff praised his "amazing mentality" after having "to wait for his chance" but then "going in and doing brilliantly". In September 2025, Shelbourne manager Joey O'Brien initially left Temple out of the club's League Phase squad for the UEFA Conference League. He eventually made it back into the squad through injuries and made 3 appearances in the 2025–26 UEFA Conference League league phase.

=== Bolton Wanderers ===
On 6 January 2026, Temple joined League One club Bolton Wanderers for an undisclosed fee, signing a two-and-a-half-year contract, with an option for another season. On 6 August 2026, he joined League Two side Oldham Athletic on a season-long loan deal.

== Personal life ==
Temple attended Presentation College in Bray. He competed internationally in kickboxing in his youth. He began kickboxing at the age of 4 with the Eagle Martial Arts Club for Bray and Arklow. When he was nine years old he won bronze at the 2014 WKKC World Kickboxing Championships, before going on to obtain a black belt and become world champion by age 12. He decided to fully focus on football when he was 15.

== Career statistics ==
As of match played 18 December 2025

Appearances and goals by club, season and competition
Club	Season	League			National cup (Note: Includes FAI Cup & FA Cup)		League Cup (Note: Includes EFL Cup)		Europe		Other		Total	
Club	Season	Division	Apps	Goals	Apps	Goals	Apps	Goals	Apps	Goals	Apps	Goals	Apps	Goals
Shelbourne	2022	LOI Premier Division	0	0	2	0	—		—		—		2	0
Shelbourne	2023	LOI Premier Division	0	0	—		—		—		3 (Note: Appearance(s) in the Leinster Senior Cup)	0	3	0
Shelbourne	2024	LOI Premier Division	2	0	—		—		—		2	0	4	0
Shelbourne	2025	LOI Premier Division	11	0	2	0	—		4 (Note: 1 appearance in the UEFA Champions League; 3 appearances in the UEFA Conference League)	0	0	0	17	0
Shelbourne	Total		13	0	4	0	—		4	0	3	0	24	0
Longford Town (loan)	2023	LOI First Division	14	0	1	0	—		—		—		15	0
Wexford (loan)	2024	LOI First Division	14	1	4	0	—		—		2 (Note: Appearances in the 2024 League of Ireland First Division Playoffs)	0	20	1
Bolton Wanderers	2025–26	EFL League One	0	0	—		—		—		0	0	0	0
Career total			41	1	9	0	0	0	4	0	5	0	59	1

== Honours ==
Shelbourne

- League of Ireland Premier Division: 2024
- President of Ireland's Cup: 2025
