= Matty Smith (footballer, born 1997) =

Scottish footballer

Personal information
- Date of birth: 13 March 1997 (age 29)
- Place of birth: Dundee, Scotland
- Positions: Winger; striker

Team information
- Current team: Waterford
- Number: 10

Youth career
- Fairmuir Boys Club
- Dundee United Social Club
- Aberdeen
- Celtic
- St Johnstone
- 2014–2016: Dundee United

Senior career*
Years	Team	Apps	(Gls)
2014–2020	Dundee United	27	(3)
2017	→ Montrose (loan)	16	(2)
2019–2020	→ Cove Rangers (loan)	8	(2)
2020	Waterford	18	(2)
2021	St Patrick's Athletic	32	(11)
2022	Derry City	19	(3)
2022	→ Shelbourne (loan)	11	(2)
2023–2024	Shelbourne	49	(6)
2025	Waterford	4	(0)
Total		184	(31)
- * Club domestic league appearances and goals as of 17:02, 11 October 2026 (UTC)

Matthew Smith (born 13 March 1997) is a Scottish Former footballer who played as a forward. He started his career with Dundee United and made his first team debut in May 2016, and subsequently had loan periods with Montrose and Cove Rangers before moving to Ireland with Waterford, St Patrick's Athletic, Derry City and Shelbourne.

== Early life ==
Matty Smith was born in Dundee on 13 March 1997. He attended Monifieth High School. He played youth football for St Johnstone for seven years, prior to joining Dundee United.

== Club career ==
=== Dundee United ===
Smith signed professionally for Dundee United in July 2014. He made his first team debut against Partick Thistle in a Scottish Premiership match on 10 May 2016.

In January 2017, he was sent on loan to Scottish League Two side Montrose until the end of the 2016–17 season. He made his debut for Montrose in a 2-1 victory at home to Cowdenbeath where he was also sent off.

Smith was given a first team chance for Dundee United in July 2017 due to injuries to other forwards. He scored his first goal for the club against Cowdenbeath in the Scottish League Cup, but an injury in training ruled him out of the subsequent Dundee derby and for the next six weeks. His first league goal for United came in a 2–1 defeat at Livingston in February 2018. A 20-yard strike he scored in a 3-1 victory against Queen of the South was voted Dundee United's goal of the 2017-2018 season at the club's annual awards. On 29 May 2018, it was announced that Smith had signed an extension to his contract at Dundee United until May 2020. The club's manager Csaba László welcomed the news and commented Smith had 'shown he can be an essential player for us.

On 15 August 2019, Smith joined Cove Rangers on loan until January 2020.

=== Waterford ===
In January 2020, Smith signed for League of Ireland Premier Division club Waterford. He scored 2 goals in 19 appearances during his season with the club.

=== St Patrick's Athletic ===
In January 2021 he was transferred from Waterford to another Irish club, St Patrick's Athletic, where he would team up with former Dundee United teammate Billy King. He made his debut for the club in the opening game of the season, a 1–1 draw away to Shamrock Rovers in a Dublin derby on 19 March 2021. Smith scored his first goal for the Saints on 23 April 2021, heading home the second goal in a 2–0 win away to Finn Harps at Finn Park. On 8 August 2021, he scored his sixth and seventh goals of the season in a 4–1 win away to Dundalk at Oriel Park. Smith scored in the FAI Cup Semi-final on 22 October 2021 to give his side a 2–1 lead over Dundalk in an eventual 3–1 win to earn a place in the 2021 FAI Cup Final. A week later, on 29 October 2021 he scored his first career hat-trick, scoring a perfect hat-trick in a 4–1 win away to Longford Town as well as assisting the other goal in a win that secured UEFA Europa Conference League football for his club for the following season. On 28 November 2021 Smith was in his sides starting XI in the 2021 FAI Cup Final, as they defeated rivals Bohemians 4–3 on penalties following a 1–1 draw after extra time in front of a record FAI Cup Final crowd of 37,126 at the Aviva Stadium.

=== Derry City ===
On 31 January 2022, Smith signed a two-year contract with Derry City. He made his career debut in European competition on 7 July 2022 against Riga FC in the UEFA Europa Conference League but was harshly sent off during a 2–0 loss for an altercation with Ngonda Muzinga.

=== Shelbourne ===
On 28 July 2022, he signed for Shelbourne on loan until the end of the season. After 2 goals in 15 appearances in all competitions during his loan spell, on 2 December 2022, it was announced that Smith would be joining Shelbourne on a permanent basis for the 2023 season. His first goal of the season coming on 10 April 2023 in a 2-1 win against Sligo Rovers. On 6 September 2024, Smith ended a 15 month goal drought when he opened the scoring in a 1–1 draw away to Bohemians with his first goal in 33 games.

=== Return to Waterford ===
On 6 December 2024, Smith returned to Waterford on a multi-year contract. During pre-season Smith underwent knee surgery on an existing injury which the club knew about before signing him, but the rehabilitation period kept him out of action for a long term spell that saw him miss almost the full first season of his contract. On 5 October 2025, he made his first appearance since signing for the club 11 months previously, coming on as a late substitute in a 2–0 win at home to Drogheda United. He made 5 appearances by th end of the season before on 12 December 2025, it was announced that he had left the club by mutual consent. His retirement from professional football was announced in February 2026.

== Career statistics ==
As of match played on 7 November 2025

Appearances and goals by club, season and competition
Club	Season	League			National Cup		League Cup		Other		Total	
Club	Season	Division	Apps	Goals	Apps	Goals	Apps	Goals	Apps	Goals	Apps	Goals
Dundee United	2015–16	Scottish Premiership	2	0	0	0	0	0	0	0	2	0
Dundee United	2016–17	Scottish Championship	0	0	0	0	0	0	0	0	0	0
Dundee United	2017–18	Scottish Championship	17	3	1	0	1	1	3 (Note: Two appearances in the Scottish Challenge Cup and one appearance in the Scottish Premiership play-offs)	0	22	4
Dundee United	2018–19	Scottish Championship	8	0	0	0	3	0	2 (Note: Appearances in the Scottish Challenge Cup)	1	13	1
Dundee United	2019–20	Scottish Championship	0	0	0	0	0	0	0	0	0	0
Dundee United	Total		27	3	1	0	4	1	5	1	37	5
Montrose (loan)	2016–17	Scottish League Two	16	2	0	0	0	0	2 (Note: Appearances in the League One play-offs)	0	18	2
Cove Rangers (loan)	2019–20	Scottish League Two	8	2	1	0	0	0	1	0	10	2
Waterford	2020	League of Ireland Premier Division	18	2	1	0	—		—		19	2
St Patrick's Athletic	2021	League of Ireland Premier Division	32	11	4	1	—		—		36	12
Derry City	2022	League of Ireland Premier Division	19	3	—		—		1 (Note: Appearances in the UEFA Europa Conference League)	0	20	3
Shelbourne (loan)	2022	League of Ireland Premier Division	11	2	4	0	—		—		15	2
Shelbourne	2023	League of Ireland Premier Division	19	4	0	0	—		1 (Note: Appearances in the Leinster Senior Cup)	0	19	4
Shelbourne	2024	League of Ireland Premier Division	30	2	2	0	—		4 (Note: Appearances in the UEFA Conference League)	0	36	2
Shelbourne	Total		49	6	2	0	—		5	0	55	6
Waterford	2025	League of Ireland Premier Division	4	0	0	0	—		1 (Note: Appearance in the 2025 League of Ireland Premier Division Promotion/Relegation play-off)	0	5	0
Career total			184	31	13	1	4	1	15	1	216	34

== Honours ==
Cove Rangers

- Scottish League Two: 2019–20

St Patrick's Athletic

- FAI Cup: 2021

Shelbourne

- League of Ireland Premier Division: 2024
