= Aodh Dervin =

Irish footballer (born 1999)

Personal information
- Full name: Aodh Dervin
- Date of birth: 21 July 1999 (age 27)
- Place of birth: Longford, Ireland
- Height: 1.70 m (5 ft 7 in)
- Position: Midfielder

Team information
- Current team: Dundalk
- Number: 6

Youth career
- 2015–2017: Longford Town

Senior career*
Years	Team	Apps	(Gls)
2017–2021	Longford Town	104	(5)
2022–2023	Shelbourne	30	(1)
2023	→ Longford Town (loan)	17	(1)
2023–2024	Galway United	30	(1)
2024–	Dundalk	78	(2)
- * Club domestic league appearances and goals as of 16:49, 10 November 2026 (UTC)

Aodh Dervin (born 21 July 1999) is an Irish professional footballer who plays as a midfielder for League of Ireland Premier Division club Dundalk.

== Club career ==
=== Youth career ===
Longford man Dervin came through the academy at local League of Ireland club Longford Town, playing for the club's under-17 side in 2015 and under-19s from 2016 into 2017 before being promoted to the first team in January 2017 by manager Alan Mathews.

=== Longford Town ===
Dervin made his debut in senior football for Longford Town on 12 March 2017, starting in a 1–0 loss to Firhouse Clover in the Leinster Senior Cup as a 17 year old. On 27 May 2017, he made his league debut for the club, replacing Kevin O'Connor from the bench in a 5–0 win at home to Wexford Youths. On 1 June 2018, Dervin scored the first senior goal of his career, opening the scoring in a 3–2 win over Galway United. On 15 November 2020, Dervin was part of the side that beat Shelbourne 1–0 at Richmond Park in the 2020 League of Ireland Promotion/Relegation Playoff to gain promotion to the Premier Division. He played in all but 1 of the club's 36 league games back in the top flight in 2021 as they were relegated back to the First Division by finishing bottom of the table.

=== Shelbourne ===
On 26 December 2021, it was announced that Dervin would be joining newly promoted League of Ireland Premier Division club Shelbourne ahead of the 2022 season. On 28 October 2022, he scored his first goal for the club in a 6–0 win over Drogheda United at Tolka Park. On 13 November 2022, Dervin was part of the Shels starting XI in the 2022 FAI Cup final, as they were defeated by a record FAI Cup Final scoreline of 4–0 to Derry City at the Aviva Stadium.

==== Longford Town loan ====
On 14 February 2023, Dervin returned to his hometown club Longford Town on loan until the summer. On 11 June 2023, his loan spell came to an end, having scored 1 goal in 17 appearances.

=== Galway United ===
On 6 July 2023, Dervin signed for League of Ireland First Division club Galway United. On 22 September 2023, he was part of the team that secured promoted back to the Premier Division by winning the 2023 League of Ireland First Division title following a 4–0 win away to Kerry at Mounthawk Park. On 23 February 2024, he scored his first goal for the club in a 2–0 victory over Dundalk at Eamonn Deacy Park. Dervin started off 2024 in good form but his game time had to be managed due to a knee ligament issue.

=== Dundalk ===
On 17 July 2024, he signed for relegation fighting League of Ireland Premier Division club Dundalk. He made 13 appearances in all competitions as the club were relegated to the League of Ireland First Division, but despite the relegation he signed a new contract with the club on 8 November 2024. On 17 January 2024, Dervin scored his first goal for the club, in a 4–0 win at home to Malahide United in the Leinster Senior Cup. On 3 March 2025, he scored his first league goal for the side, in a 2–2 draw with Treaty United at Oriel Park. On 28 August 2025, it was announced that he had signed a new contract with the club. He was made vice-captain of the club during the season, in the absence of Captain Daryl Horgan. On 10 October 2025, he was part of the side that defeated Finn Harps 3–0 to win the 2025 League of Ireland First Division title and promotion back to the Premier Division. At the end of the season he was voted Dundalk's Player of the Year for 2025. On 10 October 2026, he signed a new contract to the end of the 2029 season.

== Career statistics ==
As of match played on 30 October 2026

Appearances and goals by club, season and competition
Club	Season	League			National Cup (Note: Includes FAI Cup)		League Cup (Note: Includes League of Ireland Cup)		Other		Total	
Club	Season	Division	Apps	Goals	Apps	Goals	Apps	Goals	Apps	Goals	Apps	Goals
Longford Town	2017	LOI First Division	5	0	0	0	0	0	1 (Note: Appearance(s) in the Leinster Senior Cup)	0	6	0
Longford Town	2018	LOI First Division	22	3	3	0	1	0	1	0	27	3
Longford Town	2019	LOI First Division	25	1	2	0	0	0	0	0	0	0
Longford Town	2020	LOI First Division	17	1	1	0	–		3 (Note: Appearances in the 2020 League of Ireland Promotion Playoffs)	1	21	2
Longford Town	2021	LOI Premier Division	35	0	1	0	–		–		36	0
Longford Town	Total		99	5	7	0	1	0	5	1	112	6
Shelbourne	2022	LOI Premier Division	30	1	4	0	–		–		34	1
Shelbourne	2023	LOI Premier Division	0	0	–		–		0	0	0	0
Shelbourne	Total		30	1	4	0	–		0	0	34	1
Longford Town (loan)	2023	LOI First Division	17	1	–		–		0	0	17	1
Galway United	2023	LOI First Division	14	0	4	0	–		–		18	0
Galway United	2024	LOI Premier Division	16	1	–		–		–		16	1
Galway United	Total		30	1	4	0	–		–		34	1
Dundalk	2024	LOI Premier Division	12	0	1	0	–		–		13	0
Dundalk	2025	LOI First Division	33	1	1	0	–		3	1	37	2
Dundalk	2026	LOI Premier Division	33	1	3	0	–		3	0	39	1
Dundalk	Total		78	2	5	0	–		6	1	89	3
Career total			254	10	20	0	1	0	11	2	286	12

== Honours ==
Galway United

- League of Ireland First Division: 2023

Dundalk

- League of Ireland First Division: 2025
- Leinster Senior Cup: 2024–25
