= 2022 Shelbourne F.C. season =

Football season

Shelbourne
2022 season
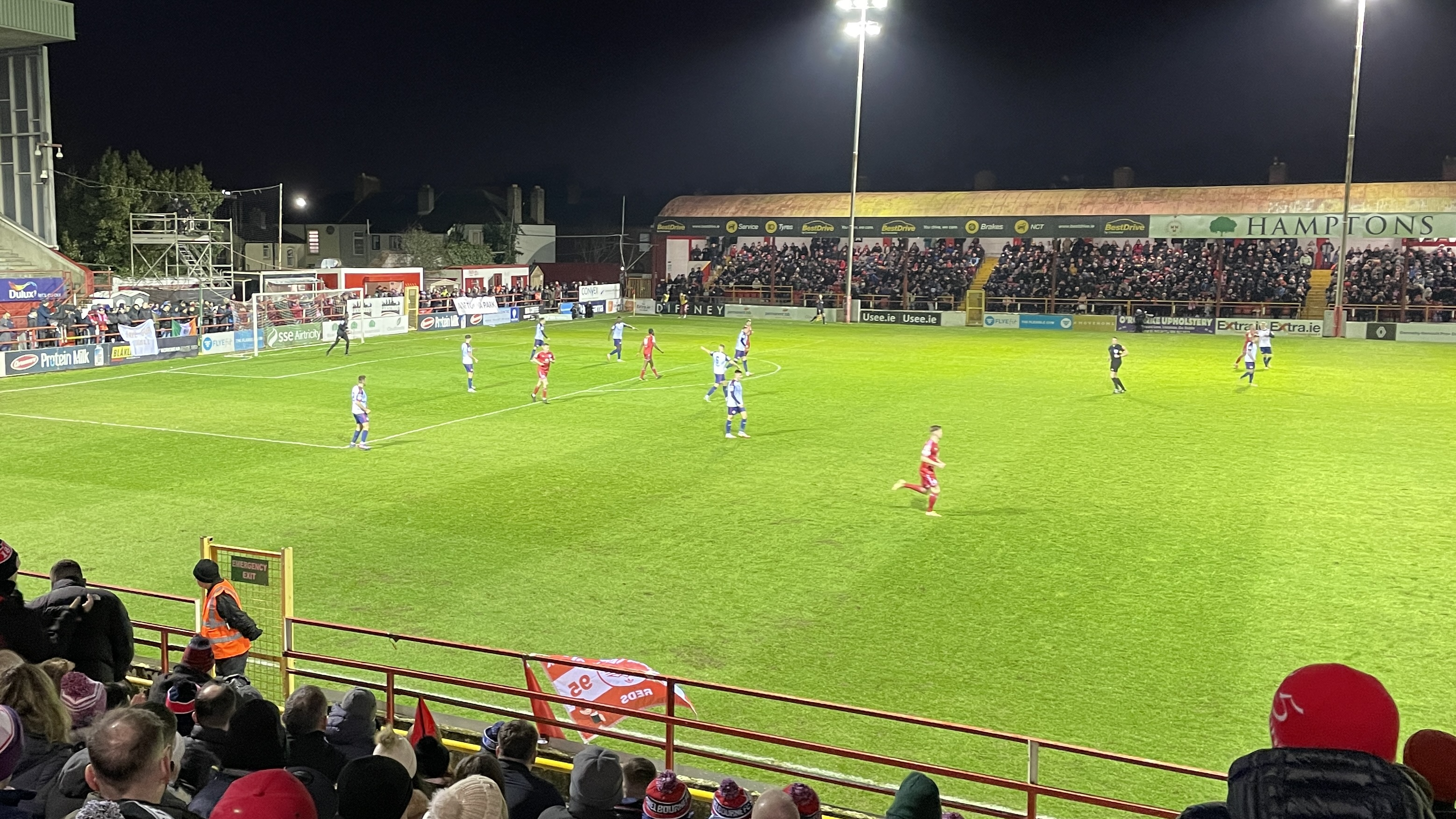
- Shelbourne FC at Tolka Park, February 2022
- Chairman: Andrew Doyle
- Head Coach: Damien Duff
- Stadium: Tolka Park, Dublin
- Premier Division: 7th
- FAI Cup: Runners-up
- Top goalscorer: League: Seán Boyd (11); All: Seán Boyd (15)
- Highest home attendance: 4,500
- Biggest win: 6-0 (v Drogheda United)
- Biggest defeat: 0-4 (v St Patricks Athletic & Derry City)
Home colours	Away colours
- All statistics correct as of 14:10 16 November 2022 (UTC).

The 2022 Shelbourne F.C. season is the club's 127th season in existence and their first back in the League of Ireland Premier Division following promotion from the League of Ireland First Division in 2021.

== First team squad ==
Players' ages are as of the opening day of the 2022 season.

#	Name	Nationality	Position	Date of birth (age)	Previous club	Signed in	Notes
Goalkeepers
1	Brendan Clarke	(Republic of Ireland)	GK	17 September 1985 (aged 36)	St Patricks Athletic	2021	
40	Scott van-der-Sluis	(Wales)	GK	9 January 2001 (aged 21)	Bangor City	2022	
Defenders
2	John Ross Wilson	(Republic of Ireland)	DF	13 December 1998 (aged 23)	Bray Wanderers	2021	Signed until 2023
3	Conor Kane	(Republic of Ireland)	DF	11 May 1998 (aged 23)	Drogheda United	2022	
4	Aaron O'Driscoll	(Republic of Ireland)	DF	4 April 1999 (aged 22)	Mansfield Town	2022	
5	Shane Griffin	(Republic of Ireland)	DF	8 September 1994 (aged 27)	St Patrick's Athletic	2022	Signed until 2023
23	Luke Byrne (c)	(Republic of Ireland)	DF	8 July 1993 (aged 28)	Shamrock Rovers	2019	
24	David Toure	(Republic of Ireland)	DF	1 October 2004 (aged 17)	Youth Team	2022	
28	Stephan Negru	(Republic of Ireland)	DF	24 July 2002 (aged 19)	Youth Team	2022	
31	Luke Browne	(Republic of Ireland)	DF	6 October 2005 (aged 16)	Youth Team	2022	
32	Kameron Ledwidge	(Republic of Ireland)	DF	7 April 2001 (aged 20)	Southampton	2021	Signed until 2023
36	Lewis Temple	(Republic of Ireland)	DF	11 June 2005 (aged 16)	Youth Team	2022	
Midfielders
6	Jonathan Lunney	(Republic of Ireland)	MF	2 February 1998 (aged 24)	Bohemian	2021	Signed until 2023
7	Brian McManus	(Republic of Ireland)	MF	29 November 2001 (aged 20)	Preston North End	2020	Signed until 2023
8	Mark Coyle	(Republic of Ireland)	MF	13 February 1997 (aged 24)	Finn Harps	2022	
10	Jack Moylan	(Republic of Ireland)	MF	1 September 2001 (aged 20)	Bohemians	2022	Signed until 2023
16	Aodh Dervin	(Republic of Ireland)	MF	21 July 1999 (aged 22)	Longford Town	2022	
17	Shane Farrell	(Republic of Ireland)	MF	26 June 2000 (aged 21)	Finglas United	2018	Signed until 2023
19	Josh Giurgi	(Republic of Ireland)	MF	18 June 2002 (aged 19)	Norwich City	2022	
20	Kyle O'Connor	(Republic of Ireland)	MF	12 March 2003 (aged 18)	Youth Team	2021	
21	Gavin Molloy	(Republic of Ireland)	MF	19 October 2001 (aged 20)	Youth Team	2022	Signed until 2023
22	Gavin Hodgins	(Republic of Ireland)	MF	5 June 2005 (aged 16)	Youth Team	2022	
Attackers
9	Seán Boyd	(Republic of Ireland)	FW	20 June 1998 (aged 23)	Finn Harps	2022	Signed until 2023
11	Daniel Hawkins	(Wales)	FW	22 April 2001 (aged 20)	Finn Harps	2022	
12	Jad Hakiki	(Republic of Ireland)	FW	23 June 2004 (aged 17)	Youth Team	2022	Signed until 2024
14	Dan Carr	(Trinidad and Tobago)	FW	29 May 1994 (aged 27)	Welling United	2022	
15	Matty Smith	(Scotland)	FW	13 March 1997 (aged 24)	Derry City	2022	On loan from Derry City
Players who appeared during the 2022 season but departed before the end of the season
13	Colm Cox	(Republic of Ireland)	GK	13 February 2001 (aged 20)	Youth Team	2022	Signed for Longford Town
15	Adam Thomas	(New Zealand)	DF	1 April 1992 (aged 29)	Oakleigh Cannons	2022	Released
18	Sean McSweeney	(Republic of Ireland)	FW	8 October 1997 (aged 24)	Treaty United	2022	Released
19	Stanley Anaebonam	(Norway)	FW	14 April 1999 (aged 22)	Unattached	2021	Released
22	Jordan McEneff	(Republic of Ireland)	MF	8 January 2001 (aged 21)	Arsenal	2022	On loan from Arsenal
25	Lewis Webb	(Wales)	GK	12 September 2001 (aged 20)	Swansea City	2022	On loan from Swansea City

== Transfers ==
=== Transfers in ===
Date	Position	Nationality	Name	Previous club	Ref.
27 November 2021	FW	(Republic of Ireland)	Seán Boyd	(Republic of Ireland) Finn Harps	
29 November 2021	MF	(Republic of Ireland)	Jack Moylan	(Republic of Ireland) Bohemians	
3 December 2021	DF	(Republic of Ireland)	Shane Griffin	(Republic of Ireland) St Patrick's Athletic	
6 December 2021	MF	(Republic of Ireland)	Mark Coyle	(Republic of Ireland) Finn Harps	
15 December 2021	DF	(Republic of Ireland)	Conor Kane	(Republic of Ireland) Drogheda United	
17 December 2021	FW	(Republic of Ireland)	Jad Hakiki	Under 17's	
19 December 2021	FW	(Wales)	Daniel Hawkins	(Republic of Ireland) Finn Harps	
26 December 2021	MF	(Republic of Ireland)	Aodh Dervin	(Republic of Ireland) Longford Town	
3 January 2022	DF	(Republic of Ireland)	David Toure	(Republic of Ireland) Under 19's	
3 January 2022	GK	(Republic of Ireland)	Colm Cox	(Republic of Ireland) Under 19's	
3 January 2022	MF	(Republic of Ireland)	Gavin Molloy	(Republic of Ireland) Under 19's	
12 January 2022	MF	(Republic of Ireland)	Aaron O'Driscoll	(Republic of Ireland) Mansfield Town	
13 January 2022	FW	(Republic of Ireland)	Sean McSweeney	(Republic of Ireland) Treaty United	
2 February 2022	FW	(Trinidad and Tobago)	Dan Carr	(England) Welling United	
15 February 2022	DF	(New Zealand)	Adam Thomas	(Australia) Oakleigh Cannons	
6 June 2022	GK	(Wales)	Scott van-der-Sluis	(Northern Ireland) Bangor City	
19 July 2022	MF	(Republic of Ireland)	Josh Giurgi	(England) Norwich City	

=== Loans in ===
Date	Position	Nationality	Name	Previous club	Date Ended	Ref.
15 January 2022	GK	(Wales)	Lewis Webb	(Wales) Swansea City	June 2022	
7 February 2022	MF	(Republic of Ireland)	Jordan McEneff	(England) Arsenal	June 2022	
29 July 2022	FW	(Scotland)	Matty Smith	(Scotland) Derry City		

=== Transfers out ===
Date	Position	Nationality	Name	To	Ref.
5 November 2021	DF	(Scotland)	Ally Gilchrist	(Republic of Ireland) Cork City	
5 November 2021	FW	(Republic of Ireland)	Michael O'Connor	(Northern Ireland) Glentoran	
15 November 2021	FW	(Republic of Ireland)	Ryan Brennan	(Republic of Ireland) Drogheda United	
19 November 2021	MF	(Republic of Ireland)	Georgie Poynton	(Republic of Ireland) Drogheda United	
19 November 2021	MF	(Republic of Ireland)	Dayle Rooney	(Republic of Ireland) Drogheda United	
27 November 2021	MF	(Republic of Ireland)	Denzil Fernandez	(Republic of Ireland) Treaty United	
2 December 2021	GK	(Republic of Ireland)	Jack Brady	(Republic of Ireland) Treaty United	
10 December 2021	DF	(Republic of Ireland)	Kevin O'Connor	(Republic of Ireland) Cork City	
2 January 2022	MF	(Republic of Ireland)	Yasine En-Neyah	(Republic of Ireland) Waterford	
12 January 2022	DF	(Cameroon)	Maxim Kouogan	(England) York City	
20 January 2022	FW	(Republic of Ireland)	Yoyo Mahdy	(Republic of Ireland) Finn Harps	
21 January 2022	MF	(Republic of Ireland)	Alex Nolan	(Republic of Ireland) UCD	
22 January 2022	MF	(Republic of Ireland)	Eric Molloy	(Republic of Ireland) Longford Town	
17 February 2022	DF	(Republic of Ireland)	Michael Barker	(Republic of Ireland) Longford Town	
1 July 2022	FW	(Norway)	Stanley Anaebonam	Released	
22 July 2022	GK	(Republic of Ireland)	Colm Cox	(Republic of Ireland) Longford Town	
29 July 2022	DF	(New Zealand)	Adam Thomas	Released	
11 August 2022	FW	(Republic of Ireland)	Sean McSweeney	Released	

== Pre-season and friendlies ==
Win Draw Loss Fixtures

22 January 2022 Friendly	Shelbourne XI	2-0	Wexford	Clonshaugh, Dublin
12:00 IST	Hadiki 66'; McManus 87'			Stadium: AUL Complex

22 January 2022 Friendly	Galway United	0-2	Shelbourne XI	Galway, County Galway
18:00 IST			Wilson 37', 54'	Stadium: Eamonn Deacy Park

29 January 2022 Friendly	Shelbourne XI	5-2	UCD XI	Clonshaugh, Dublin
11:00 IST	Anaebonam 20', 38', 62'; Moylan 72'; Hakiki 85'		8'; 39'	Stadium: AUL Complex

29 January 2022 Friendly	Shelbourne XI	1-0	UCD XI	Clonshaugh, Dublin
14:00 IST	Boyd 32' (pen.)			Stadium: AUL Complex

5 February 2022 Friendly	Drogheda United	1-0	Shelbourne XI
12:00 IST	Lyons 42'

5 February 2022 Friendly	Athlone Town	1-3	Shelbourne XI	Lissywollen, Athlone
18:00 IST	Trialist 46'		Kane 11'; Carr 50'; Negru 63'	Stadium: Athlone Town Stadium

11 February 2022 Friendly	Cork City	1-1	Shelbourne XI	Turners Cross, Cork
19:30 IST	Murphy 57'		Carr 32'	Stadium: Turners Cross

== Competitions ==
=== Overview ===
Competition	Starting round	Record							
Competition	Starting round	Pld	W	D	L	GF	GA	GD	Win %
Premier Division	Matchday 1	36	10	11	15	40	49	−9	27.78
FAI Cup	First round	5	4	0	1	11	4	+7	80.00
Total		41	14	11	16	51	53	−2	34.15

Source: Soccerway

=== League of Ireland ===
Pos	Team	Pld	W	D	L	GF	GA	GD	Pts	Qualification or relegation
1	Shamrock Rovers (C)	36	24	7	5	61	22	+39	79	Qualification for Champions League first qualifying round
2	Derry City	36	18	12	6	53	27	+26	66	Qualification for Europa Conference League first qualifying round
3	Dundalk	36	18	12	6	53	30	+23	66	Qualification for Europa Conference League first qualifying round
4	St Patrick's Athletic	36	18	7	11	57	37	+20	61	Qualification for Europa Conference League first qualifying round
5	Sligo Rovers	36	13	10	13	47	44	+3	49	
6	Bohemians	36	12	10	14	45	46	−1	46	
7	Shelbourne	36	10	11	15	40	49	−9	41	
8	Drogheda United	36	9	11	16	34	58	−24	38	
9	UCD (O)	36	6	8	22	28	67	−39	26	Qualification for relegation play-offs
10	Finn Harps (R)	36	4	8	24	33	71	−38	20	Relegation to 2023 League of Ireland First Division

Source: SSE Airtricity League, Soccerway
Rules for classification: 1) Points; 2) Goal difference; 3) Goals scored.
(C) Champions; (O) Play-off winners; (R) Relegated

==== Results summary ====
Overall								Home						Away					
Pld	W	D	L	GF	GA	GD	Pts	W	D	L	GF	GA	GD	W	D	L	GF	GA	GD
36	10	11	15	40	49	−9	41	5	6	7	23	25	−2	5	5	8	17	24	−7

==== Results by matchday ====
Matchday	1	2	3	4	5	6	7	8	9	10	11	12	13	14	15	16	17	18	19	20	21	22	23	24	25	26	27	28	29	30	31	32	33	34	35	36
Ground	H	A	A	H	H	A	H	A	H	A	H	A	A	H	H	A	H	A	A	H	A	H	A	A	H	H	A	H	H	A	H	A	A	H	H	A
Result	L	W	D	L	D	D	L	W	L	W	L	L	L	W	W	W	W	L	L	D	L	W	W	L	D	L	D	L	D	D	D	L	D	D	W	L
Position	9	5	6	7	6	6	7	6	7	8	8	8	8	7	7	7	6	6	7	7	7	7	7	7	7	7	7	7	7	7	7	7	7	7	7	7

Source: extratime.ie
A = Away; H = Home; W = Win; D = Draw; L = Loss

==== Matches ====
18 February 2022 1	Shelbourne	0-3	St Patrick's Athletic	Drumcondra, Dublin
19:45 IST		Report; Highlights	Burns 19'; M.Doyle 59'; McClelland 87'	Stadium: Tolka Park; Attendance: 4,100; Referee: Robert Hennessy

25 February 2022 2	Drogheda United	0-2	Shelbourne	Drogheda, County Louth
19:45 IST		Report; Highlights	Hawkins 48'; Coyle 90+3'	Stadium: United Park; Attendance: 1,463; Referee: Oliver Moran

28 February 2022 3	UCD	0-0	Shelbourne	Belfield, Dublin
19:45 IST		Report; Highlights		Stadium: UCD Bowl; Referee: Alan Patchell

4 March 2022 4	Shelbourne	0-1	Derry City	Drumcondra, Dublin
19:45 IST		Report; Highlights	McEleney 73'	Stadium: Tolka Park; Attendance: 3,200; Referee: Ray Matthews

11 March 2022 5	Shelbourne	1-1	Dundalk	Drumcondra, Dublin
19:45 IST	Boyd 86'	Report; Highlights	Hoban 69'	Stadium: Tolka Park; Attendance: 2,990; Referee: Derek Tomney

14 March 2022 6	Bohemians	1-1	Shelbourne	Phibsborough, Dublin
19:45 IST	Feely (red card) 75'; Horton 83'	Report; Highlights	Boyd 75'	Stadium: Dalymount Park; Referee: Robert Harvey

18 March 2022 7	Shelbourne	0-3	Finn Harps	Drumcondra, Dublin
19:45 IST		Report; Highlights	Boyle 45'; Tourish 63'; McWoods 88'	Stadium: Tolka Park; Attendance: 2,300; Referee: John McLoughlin

1 April 2022 8	Sligo Rovers	0-1	Shelbourne	Sligo Town, Sligo
19:45 IST		Report; Highlights	Carr 33' (pen.)	Stadium: The Showgrounds; Attendance: 2,626; Referee: Ray Matthews

8 April 2022 9	Shelbourne	1-2	Shamrock Rovers	Drumcondra, Dublin
19:45 IST	Farrell 58'	Report; Highlights	Lyons 2'; Greene 88'	Stadium: Tolka Park; Attendance: 4,238; Referee: Damien McGraith

15 April 2022 10	Derry City	1-2	Shelbourne	Derry
19:45 IST	Akintunde 30'	Report; Highlights	Farrell 68'; McManus 75'; Dervin (red card) 91'	Stadium: Ryan McBride Brandywell Stadium; Attendance: 3,000; Referee: Rob Hennessy

18 April 2022 11	Shelbourne	1-4	Bohemians	Drumcondra, Dublin
19:45 IST	Boyd 21'	Report; Highlights	Burt 13'; Devoy 43' (.pen); Twardek 50'; Ogedi-Uzokwe 66'	Stadium: Tolka Park; Attendance: 4,238; Referee: Jon McLoughlin

22 April 2022 12	Dundalk	2-1	Shelbourne	Dundalk, County Louth
19:45 IST	Bradley (red card) 56'; Kelly 63'; Martin 86'	Report; Highlights	Griffin (red card) 45'; Farrell 80' (.pen)	Stadium: Oriel Park; Attendance: 2.427; Referee: Paul McLaughlin

29 April 2022 13	Finn Harps	1-0	Shelbourne	Ballybofey, County Donegal
20:00 IST	McNamee 88'	Report; Highlights	Coyle (yellow card) 62'	Stadium: Finn Park; Attendance: 1,352; Referee: Derek Tomney

6 May 2022 14	Shelbourne	2-1	Sligo Rovers	Drumcondra, Dublin
19:45 IST	Moylan 20'; Boyd 43'	Report; Highlights	Kirk 63'	Stadium: Tolka Park; Attendance: 2500; Referee: Ben Connolly

13 May 2022 15	Shelbourne	1-0	Drogheda United	Drumcondra, Dublin
19:45 IST	Boyd 51'	Report; Highlights		Stadium: Tolka Park; Attendance: 2800; Referee: Rob Hennessy

20 May 2022 16	St Patrick's Athletic	1-2	Shelbourne	Inchicore, Dublin
19:45 IST	Redmond 45+3'	Report; Highlights	Moylan 24'; Lunney	Stadium: Richmond Park; Attendance: 3500; Referee: Damien McGraith

23 May 2022 17	Shelbourne	2-0	UCD	Drumcondra, Dublin
19:45 IST	Boyd 45' (.pen); Moylan 46'	Report; Highlights		Stadium: Tolka Park; Attendance: 1700; Referee: Ben Connolly

27 May 2022 18	Shamrock Rovers	2-0	Shelbourne	Tallaght, Dublin
20:00 IST	Towell 3'; Gaffney 30'	Report; Highlights		Stadium: Tallaght Stadium; Attendance: 6500; Referee: Robert Hennessy

10 June 2022 Postponed	Shelbourne	P-P	Derry City	Drumcondra, Dublin
19:45 IST		Reference		Stadium: Tolka Park

17 June 2022 20	Bohemians	1-0	Shelbourne	Phibsborough, Dublin
19:45 IST	Devoy 12'	Report; Highlights		Stadium: Dalymount Park; Attendance: 3,500; Referee: Sean Grant

24 June 2022 21	Shelbourne	0-0	Dundalk	Drumcondra, Dublin
19:45 IST		Report; Highlights		Stadium: Tolka Park; Referee: Rob Hennessy

2 July 2022 22	Sligo Rovers	3-1	Shelbourne	Sligo Town, Sligo
19:45 IST	Mata 23'; Keena 37', 90+3'	Report; Highlights	McManus 5'	Stadium: The Showgrounds; Attendance: 2,300; Referee: John McLoughlin

8 July 2022 23	Shelbourne	3-1	Finn Harps	Drumcondra, Dublin
19:45 IST	Molloy 14', 38'; Moylan 75'	Report; Highlights	Boyle 19'	Stadium: Tolka Park; Attendance: 1,500 (estimated); Referee: Kevin O'Sullivan

15 July 2022 Postponed	Shelbourne	P-P	Shamrock Rovers	Drumcondra, Dublin
19:45 IST		Reference		Stadium: Tolka Park

22 July 2022 25	UCD	0-2	Shelbourne	Belfield, Dublin
19:45 IST		Report; Highlights	Boyd 55'; Carr 90+2'	Stadium: UCD Bowl; Referee: John McLoughlin

7 August 2022 Postponed	Shelbourne	P-P	St Patrick's Athletic	Drumcondra, Dublin
17:00 IST		Reference		Stadium: Tolka Park

12 August 2022 27	Drogheda United	3-1	Shelbourne	Drogheda, County Louth
19:45 IST	Brennan 32', 78'; Rooney 56'	Report; Highlights	Moylan 7'	Stadium: United Park; Attendance: 1942; Referee: John McLoughlin

19 August 2022 28	Shelbourne	1-1	Bohemians	Drumcondra, Dublin
19:45 IST	Wilson (red card) 45'; Farrell 56' (.pen)	Report; Highlights	Wilson 5'	Stadium: Tolka Park; Attendance: 3,750; Referee: Neil Doyle

29 August 2022 19	Shelbourne	0-1	Derry City	Drumcondra, Dublin
19:45 IST		Report; Highlights	Graydon 90+1'	Stadium: Tolka Park; Referee: Robert Harvey

2 September 2022 29	Dundalk	0-0	Shelbourne	Dundalk, County Louth
19:45 IST		Report; Highlights		Stadium: Oriel Park; Attendance: 2,000 (estimate); Referee: Paul McLaughlin

9 September 2022 30	Shelbourne	0-2	Sligo Rovers	Drumcondra, Dublin
19:45 IST		Report; Highlights	Liivak 24'; Keena 66'	Stadium: Tolka Park; Referee: John McLoughlin

22 September 2022 24	Shelbourne	0-0	Shamrock Rovers	Drumcondra, Dublin
19:45 IST		Report; Highlights		Stadium: Tolka Park; Attendance: 2,700 (estimate); Referee: Ben Connolly

30 September 2022 31	Finn Harps	1-1	Shelbourne	Ballybofey, County Donegal
19:45 IST	Tourish 52'	Report; Highlights	Negru 57'	Stadium: Finn Park; Referee: Adriano Reale

3 October 2022 26	Shelbourne	4-4	St. Patrick's Athletic	Drumcondra, Dublin
19:45 IST	Boyd 13', 52' (.pen); Smith 27'; Lunney 66'	Report; Highlights	Cotter 20'; Boyd 45' (.og); Doyle 69' (.pen), 77' (.pen)	Stadium: Tolka Park; Attendance: 3,000 (estimate); Referee: Neil Doyle

9 October 2022 32	Shamrock Rovers	3-2	Shelbourne	Tallaght, Dublin
17:00 IST		Report; Highlights	Farrell 14', 46'	Stadium: Tallaght Stadium; Attendance: 4,200 (estimate); Referee: Robert Harvey

21 October 2022 34	Derry City	1-1	Shelbourne	Derry
19:45 IST		Report; Highlights	Moylan 69'	Stadium: Ryan McBride Brandywell Stadium; Attendance: 3,000 (estimate); Referee: Derek Tomney

24 October 2022 33	Shelbourne	1-1	UCD	Drumcondra, Dublin
19:45 IST	Ledwidge 40'	Report; Highlights		Stadium: Tolka Park; Attendance: 1,000 (estimate); Referee: Sean Grant

28 October 2022 35	Shelbourne	6-0	Drogheda United	Drumcondra, Dublin
19:45 IST	Moylan 8'; Wilson 16'; Boyd 21' (.pen), 31' (.pen); Smith 63'; Dervin 88'	Report; Highlights		Stadium: Tolka Park; Attendance: 2,200 (estimate)

4 November 2022 36	St Patrick's Athletic	4-0	Shelbourne	Inchicore, Dublin
19:45 IST	E.Doyle 14'; E.Doyle 20'; Breslin 38'; McCormack 89'	Report; Highlights		Stadium: Richmond Park; Attendance: 4,655; Referee: Paulo McLoughlin

=== FAI Cup ===
==== Matches ====
29 July 2022 1st Round	Bray Wanderers	0-3	Shelbourne	Bray, County Wicklow
19:45 IST		Report; Highlights	Boyd 5', 11'; Moylan 66'	Stadium: Carlisle Grounds

26 August 2022 2nd Round	Bonagee United	0-4	Shelbourne	Letterkenny, County Donegal
20:00 IST		Report; Highlights	Giurgi 45'; Carr 53', 73'; Moylan 60'	Stadium: Dry Arch Park

18 September 2022 Quarter Final	Shelbourne	3-0	Bohemians	Drumcondra, Dublin
14:00 IST	Moylan 20'; Boyd 38', 73'	Report; Highlights		Stadium: Tolka Park; Attendance: 4,500; Referee: Robert Harvey

16 October 2022 Semi Final	Waterford	0-1	Shelbourne	Waterford
16:45 IST		Report; Highlights	Molloy 16'	Stadium: Waterford Regional Sports Centre; Attendance: 4,952; Referee: Rob Hennessey

16 November 2022 Final	Derry City	4-0	Shelbourne	Lansdowne Road, Dublin
15:00 IST		Report; Highlights		Stadium: Aviva Stadium; Attendance: 32,412; Referee: Damien McGrath

== Statistics ==
=== Appearances and goals ===
As of match played 13 November 2022

No	Pos	Nat	Name	League		FAI Cup		Total	
No	Pos	Nat	Name	Apps	Goals	Apps	Goals	Apps	Goals
1	GK	(Republic of Ireland)	Brendan Clarke	29	0	4	0	33	0
2	DF	(Republic of Ireland)	John Ross Wilson	25 (4)	1	4 (1)	0	29 (5)	1
3	GK	(Republic of Ireland)	Conor Kane	27	0	1 (1)	0	28 (1)	0
4	DF	(Republic of Ireland)	Aaron O'Driscoll	21 (4)	0	0	0	21 (4)	0
5	DF	(Republic of Ireland)	Shane Griffin	26 (2)	0	4	0	30 (2)	0
6	MF	(Republic of Ireland)	Jonathan Lunney	19 (6)	2	5	0	24 (6)	2
7	MF	(Republic of Ireland)	Brian McManus	15 (8)	2	1 (2)	0	16 (10)	2
8	MF	(Republic of Ireland)	Mark Coyle	15 (6)	1	1 (1)	0	16 (7)	1
9	FW	(Republic of Ireland)	Sean Boyd	20 (7)	11	4	4	24 (7)	15
10	MF	(Republic of Ireland)	Jack Moylan	26 (1)	7	3 (2)	3	29 (3)	10
11	MF	(Wales)	Dan Hawkins	2 (3)	1	0	0	2 (3)	1
12	MF	(Republic of Ireland)	Jad Hakiki	7 (3)	0	0 (1)	0	7 (4)	0
~~13~~	GK	(Republic of Ireland)	Colm Cox	0	0	0	0	0	0
14	FW	(Trinidad and Tobago)	Dan Carr	9 (18)	2	1 (1)	2	10 (19)	4
15	FW	(Scotland)	Matty Smith	10 (1)	2	3 (1)	0	13 (2)	2
~~15~~	DF	(New Zealand)	Adam Thomas	4	0	0	0	4	0
16	MF	(Republic of Ireland)	Aodh Dervin	19 (11)	1	2 (1)	0	21 (12)	1
17	MF	(Republic of Ireland)	Shane Farrell	30 (4)	6	5	0	35 (4)	6
18	FW	(Republic of Ireland)	Sean McSweeney	0	0	0	0	0	0
19	MF	(Republic of Ireland)	Josh Giurgi	2 (4)	0	2	1	4 (4)	1
~~19~~	FW	(Norway)	Stanley Anaebonam	0 (9)	0	0	0	0 (9)	0
20	MF	(Republic of Ireland)	Kyle O'Connor	0 (1)	0	0	0	0 (1)	0
21	DF	(Republic of Ireland)	Gavin Molloy	15 (4)	2	5	1	20 (4)	3
22	MF	(Republic of Ireland)	Gavin Hodgins	1 (4)	0	0 (1)	0	1 (5)	0
~~22~~	MF	(Republic of Ireland)	Jordan McEneff	6 (7)	0	0	0	6 (7)	0
23	DF	(Republic of Ireland)	Luke Byrne	34	0	4	0	38	0
24	DF	(Republic of Ireland)	David Toure	0	0	0	0	0	0
~~25~~	GK	(Wales)	Lewis Webb	7	0	0	0	7	0
28	DF	(Republic of Ireland)	Stephen Negru	6	1	3	0	9	1
31	DF	(Republic of Ireland)	Luke Browne	0 (1)	0	0	0	0	0 (1)
32	DF	(Republic of Ireland)	Kameron Ledwidge	21 (13)	1	3 (1)	0	24 (14)	1
36	DF	(Republic of Ireland)	Lewis Temple	0	0	0 (2)	0	0 (2)	0
40	GK	(Wales)	Scott van-der-Sluis	0	0	1	0	1	0

- Players listed in italics left the club mid-season
- Source: RedsStats1895

=== Goalscorers ===
As of match played 13 November 2022

No	Pos	Nat	Player	LOI	FAIC	Total
9	FW	(Republic of Ireland)	Sean Boyd	11	4	15
10	MF	(Republic of Ireland)	Jack Moylan	7	3	10
17	MF	(Republic of Ireland)	Shane Farrell	6	0	6
14	FW	(Trinidad and Tobago)	Dan Carr	2	2	4
21	MF	(Republic of Ireland)	Gavin Molloy	2	1	3
7	MF	(Republic of Ireland)	Brian McManus	2	0	2
6	MF	(Republic of Ireland)	Jonathan Lunney	2	0	2
15	MF	(Scotland)	Matty Smith	2	0	2
11	MF	(Wales)	Dan Hawkins	1	0	1
8	MF	(Republic of Ireland)	Mark Coyle	1	0	1
19	MF	(Republic of Ireland)	Josh Giurgi	0	1	1
28	DF	(Republic of Ireland)	Stephan Negru	1	0	1
2	DF	(Republic of Ireland)	John Ross Wilson	1	0	1
16	MF	(Republic of Ireland)	Aodh Dervin	1	0	1
32	DF	(Republic of Ireland)	Kameron Ledwidge	1	0	1
Total				40	11	51

- Players listed in italics left the club mid-season
- Source: RedsStats1985

=== Discipline ===
As of match played 13 November 2022

No	Pos	Nat	Player	LOI		FAIC		Total	
No	Pos	Nat	Player	Yellow card	Red card	Yellow card	Red card	Yellow card	Red card
7	FW	(Republic of Ireland)	Sean Boyd	14	1	3	0	17	1
7	MF	(Republic of Ireland)	Brian McManus	8	0	1	0	9	0
2	DF	(Republic of Ireland)	John Ross Wilson	8	1	0	0	8	1
4	DF	(Republic of Ireland)	Aaron O'Driscoll	7	0	0	0	7	0
17	DF	(Republic of Ireland)	Shane Farrell	7	0	0	0	7	0
16	MF	(Republic of Ireland)	Aodh Dervin	6	1	0	0	6	1
15	FW	(Republic of Ireland)	Shane Griffin	5	1	1	0	6	1
8	MF	(Republic of Ireland)	Mark Coyle	5	0	0	0	5	0
15	MF	(Republic of Ireland)	Matty Smith	5	0	0	0	5	0
23	DF	(Republic of Ireland)	Luke Byrne	4	0	1	0	5	0
21	MF	(Republic of Ireland)	Gavin Molloy	4	0	0	0	4	0
3	DF	(Republic of Ireland)	Conor Kane	3	0	0	0	3	0
1	GK	(Republic of Ireland)	Brendan Clarke	3	0	0	0	3	0
9	FW	(Trinidad and Tobago)	Dan Carr	3	0	0	0	3	0
6	MG	(Republic of Ireland)	JJ Lunney	3	0	0	0	3	0
10	MF	(Republic of Ireland)	Jack Moylan	2	0	0	0	2	0
11	MF	(Republic of Ireland)	Dan Hawkins	1	0	0	0	1	0
15	MF	(Republic of Ireland)	Adam Thomas	1	0	0	0	1	0
32	DF	(Republic of Ireland)	Kameron Ledwidge	1	0	0	0	1	0
Total				89	4	8	0	97	4

- Players listed in italics left the club mid-season.
- Source: RedsStats1895

== Kit ==
The 2022 home shirt was released on 10 December 2021. The away shirt was released on 8 February 2022 with the names of 2021 season ticket holders, staff and volunteers featured in the pattern.

Supplier: Umbro
Sponsor(s): Hamptons Floor Store (Front of Jersey)

Home	Away

Type	Shirt	Shorts	Socks	Info
Home	Red	Red	Red	Worn 31 times; against Bohemians (LOI) Hx2 (FAI) H, Bonagee United (FAI) A, Bray Wanderers (FAI) A, Derry City (LOI) Hx2, Drogheda United (LOI) Hx2, Dundalk (LOI) Hx2 & Ax2, Finn Harps (LOI) Hx2 & Ax2, Shamrock Rovers (LOI) Hx2 & Ax2, Sligo Rovers (LOI) Hx2, St Patricks Athletic (LOI) Hx2 & A, UCD (LOI) Hx2 & Ax2, Waterford United (FAI) A
Away	White & Sky Blue	Sky Blue	Sky Blue	Worn 10 times; against Bohemians (LOI) Ax2, Derry City (LOI) Ax2 (FAI) N, Drogheda United (LOI) Ax2, Sligo Rovers (LOI) Ax2, St Patricks Athletic (LOI) A

Key: H = Home, A = Away, N = Neutral

== Overview ==
=== Preseason ===
Damien Duff was announced as manager for the 2022 season on 3 November 2021. Defender Ally Gilchrist was announced as a new signing for Cork City on 5 November 2021 on the same day that striker Michael O'Connor was released after one season at Tolka Park. 2021 Player of the Season Ryan Brennan departed the club on 15 November 2021, and Joey O'Brien was announced as a member of Duff's backroom team. The departures of Georgie Poynton and Dayle Rooney were announced on 19 November 2021, while the re-signings of Luke Byrne and Jonathan Lunney for the new season were announced on 24 November 2021. Brendan Clarke and JR Wilson signed for a further season on 25 November 2021, and Shane Farrell and Stanley Anaebonam re-signed on 26 November 2021 Yoyo Madhy also re-signed for 2022 on 27 November 2021 as Denzil Fernandez announced his departure from the club (subsequently signing for Treaty United).

The first new signing of the season was announced on 27 November 2021 with striker Sean Boyd making the switch from Finn Harps. Ex-Bohemian Jack Moylan joined the club on 29 November 2021 after a successful loan period with Wexford at the end of 2021. Goalkeeper Jack Brady departed to join Treaty United on 2 December 2021, while Shane Griffin joined from St Patricks on 3 December 2021 and Brian McManus re-signed on 4 December 2021 . Kameron Ledwidge signed for another season on 5 December and midfielder Mark Coyle signed from Finn Harps on 6 December 2021. Defender Kevin O'Connor left Shels to return to Cork City while Conor Kane joined from Drogheda United on 15 December 2021. 2021 Under 17's Player of the Year Jad Hakiki signed his first professional contract with the club on 17 December 2021

Welsh forward Daniel Hawkins signed on 19 December 2021 after a season with Finn Harps, and midfielder Aodh Dervin signed from Longford Town on 26 December 2021. The departure of Yasine En-Neyah was confirmed on 3 January 2022 as the midfielder teamed up with ex-Shels manager Ian Morris at Waterford. Gavin Molloy, David Toure and Colm Cox were confirmed as being retained on 3 January 2022. Defender Aaron O'Driscoll joined from EFL League Two side Mansfield Town following a successful loan period at Longford Town in 2021. Maxim Kouogan was announced as a new signing for National League North side York City on 12 January 2022, while forward Sean McSweeney signed from Treaty United on 13 January 2022. 20 year old goalkeeper Lewis Webb joined on loan from EFL Championship side Swansea City on 15 January 2022 for an undisclosed period.

Having signed for the 2022 season in November, the club announced that Yoyo Mahdy had departed to join Finn Harps on 20 January 2022. UCD announced the signing of Alex Nolan on 21 January 2022, and Eric Molloy announced via his Twitter feed on 22 January 2022 that he had departed the club before joining Longford Town. Striker Daniel Carr signed on 2 February 2022 following a short spell with Welling United. Jordan McEneff joined on loan until June 2022 from English Premier League side Arsenal on 7 February 2022. New Zealander Adam Thomas was signed on 15 February 2022 after training with the squad during the close season, and defender Michael Barker was confirmed as having joined Longford Town on 17 February 2022

=== Main Season ===
Hours before the season opener against St Patrick's Athletic it was announced that Shelbourne had met with the Dublin City Council to propose purchasing Tolka Park and redeveloping it into a multi sport stadium. A sell out crowd of 4,100 at Tolka Park saw 9 new players line up for Shels with Luke Byrne and John Ross Wilson the only starters from the 2021 squad. In a game broadcast live on RTÉ, Shelbourne scored in the 2nd minute only to have the goal ruled for offside. Two stray passes led to goals for St Pat's, and a third goal in the 85th minute secured their win. Dan Hawkins and Mark Coyle scored the first goals of the season away to Drogheda United to give Shels their first win. This was followed by a 0–0 draw at UCD in a game that was stopped for 8 minutes due to the pitch sprinklers coming on mid game. Shels returned to Tolka Park for the fixture against Derry City but a 73rd-minute goal for the visitors saw Derry leave as victors. The remainder of March saw Shels draw 1–1 with both Dundalk and Bohemians before losing 0–3 at home to bottom club Finn Harps ahead of the first season break.

Shelbourne returned from the break with a convincing away win over Sligo Rovers, but their search for a home win continued after defeats to Shamrock Rovers and Bohemians. A further away win over league leaders Derry was followed by losses to Dundalk and Finn Harps, leaving Shels finishing the month in 8th position. On 5 May Dublin City Council recommended abandoning plans to rezone Tolka Park for residential use in a huge boost for the club. Shels welcomed Sligo Rovers the following day and ran out 2-1 winners with a first goal for Jack Moylan and a fourth of the season for Sean Boyd securing the win. It was the start of a run of four wins following Duff's three game touchline ban after being sent off during the Drogheda. A defeat away to Shamrock Rovers saw Shels retain their 6th position in the league table on the same day that Shane Farrell signed a contract extension which secured his services for the 2023 season. Lewis Webb was recalled to his parent club Swansea City during the mid-season break which was extended with the postponement of the home fixture against Derry City due to International call ups. Jordan McEneff also returned to his parent club in the same week as Welsh goalkeeper Scott Van Der Sluis joined and Jonathan Lunney extended his contract until 2023. 17 year old Gavin Hodgins made his debut off the bench as Shels failed to capitalise on Ciaran Kelly's sending off in a 0–1 defeat away to Bohemian's. An improved performance 7 days later saw Shels draw 0–0 with 2nd placed Dundalk. Jad Hakiki's services were secured with a contract extension until 2024 on 30 June 2022, with Brian McManus being signed to 2023 soon after An away defeat to Sligo Rovers was followed by 3–1 win at home over Finn Harps, helping the team maintain 7th position in the league.

Premier Division safety was confirmed following the 1–1 draw away to Finn Harps on 30 September 2022, as Stephan Negru scored his first senior goal on his first senior start for the team.

Shels finished the season with just 3 wins from their final 19 league games. A 2–0 away win to UCD and a 6–0 rout to Drogheda in the second last game of the year.
