= Daniel Carr (footballer) =

Trinidadian footballer (born 1994)

Personal information
- Full name: Daniel Clive Carr
- Date of birth: 29 May 1994 (age 32)
- Place of birth: Lambeth, London, England
- Height: 1.81 m (5 ft 11 1/2 in)
- Position: Striker

Team information
- Current team: Sevenoaks Town

Youth career
- 2010–2012: Reading

Senior career*
Years	Team	Apps	(Gls)
2012	Eastbourne Borough	3	(0)
2012–2013	Dulwich Hamlet	30	(17)
2013–2015	Huddersfield Town	2	(0)
2013–2014	→ Fleetwood Town (loan)	4	(1)
2014	→ Mansfield Town (loan)	4	(1)
2015	→ Dagenham & Redbridge (loan)	6	(0)
2015–2016	Cambridge United	4	(0)
2015–2016	→ Aldershot Town (loan)	7	(0)
2016	→ Woking (loan)	10	(2)
2016–2017	Dulwich Hamlet	25	(6)
2017	→ Leatherhead (loan)	14	(8)
2017–2018	Karlstad BK	19	(8)
2018–2019	Shamrock Rovers	57	(16)
2019	Apollon Limassol	4	(1)
2020	RoPS	7	(0)
2021	Bengaluru United	4	(1)
2021	Welling United	8	(2)
2022	Shelbourne	27	(2)
2023–	Sevenoaks Town	1	(1)

International career^{‡}
2019–2021	Trinidad and Tobago	6	(0)
- * Club domestic league appearances and goals as of 22:41, 15 January 2023 (UTC) ‡ National team caps and goals as of 22:41, 15 January 2023 (UTC)

Daniel Clive Carr (born 29 May 1994) is a professional footballer who plays as a striker for Isthmian League club Sevenoaks Town. He made 6 appearances for the Trinidad and Tobago national team between 2019 and 2021.

== Playing career ==
=== Early career ===
After being released by the Reading academy, Carr dropped down to the Conference South with Eastbourne Borough before joining Dulwich Hamlet in 2012, and scored 25 goals in the season, which led him to being scouted by many higher-level clubs including Chelsea and Liverpool. Carr also previously went on trial at Liverpool, Leeds United, Charlton Athletic.

=== Huddersfield Town ===
On 13 April 2013, it was announced that Carr had joined Football League Championship side Huddersfield Town for an undisclosed five figure fee on a two-year deal (with the option to add a further 12 months). Upon joining the club, Carr believed joining Huddersfield Town could give him a Football League career. and was given the number 26 shirt.

His first foray into the Town first team was when he appeared on the bench in Town's 0–0 draw against Doncaster Rovers on 14 September 2013. He made his début for the Terriers in the Football League Cup game against Hull City at the KC Stadium on 24 September 2013. He made his league début for the club as a 75th-minute substitute for Keith Southern in the 2–1 defeat against Wigan Athletic at the DW Stadium on 2 November 2013.

On 19 November 2013, Daniel signed on loan for Football League Two side Fleetwood Town. Carr made his debut for the club on 14 December 2013, in a 2–1 win against Rochdale. Carr then extended his loan spell with Fleetwood Town for another month. He scored his first goal for the club on 1 January 2014, in a 3–1 win against Accrington Stanley. His loan spell ended on 21 January 2014 after making five appearances and scoring once.

On 21 October 2014, he joined Football League Two side Mansfield Town on an emergency one-month loan. On the same day, Carr made his debut for the club, where he came on as substitute in the second half, in a 0–0 draw against Tranmere Rovers. Carr then scored his first goal, in a 1–1 draw against York City, four days later on 25 October 2014. After making four appearances and scoring once, Carr loan spell with Mansfield Town came to an end on 18 November 2014.

On 2 February 2015, Carr joined League Two side Dagenham & Redbridge on loan for the rest of the season. Carr made his Dagenham & Redbridge debut five days later, coming on as a substitute for Alex Jakubiak in the 81st minute, in a 2–0 win over York City. Carr went on to make six appearances for the club.

At the end of the 2014–15 season, Carr was released by the club after two years.

=== Cambridge United ===
After being released by Huddersfield Town, Carr joined Cambridge United on a two-year contract. On 15 August 2015, Carr made his Cambridge United debut in a 4–4 away draw against Carlisle United, replacing Conor Newton with 24 minutes remaining.

On 26 November 2015, after failing to impress at the Abbey Stadium, Carr joined National League side Aldershot Town on loan until 9 January 2016. Two days later, Carr made his Aldershot Town debut in a 2–0 defeat to title challengers Cheltenham Town. Carr made little impact under manager Barry Smith, after only appearing seven times and failing to score before returning to Cambridge United.

On 4 March 2016, Carr joined Woking on loan until 9 April 2016, to bolster their attacking options. On 5 March 2016, Carr made his Woking debut in a 1–0 home defeat to Dover Athletic, playing 62 minutes before being replaced by Jake Caprice. On 26 March 2016, Carr scored his first Woking goal in a 1–1 draw with Kidderminster Harriers, scoring in the 14th minute and playing the full 90 minutes. On the same day Carr's loan spell at Woking was extended, he scored a second half penalty to assist Woking in a 2–1 victory over title challengers Forest Green Rovers, therefore sealing the Cards' first victory in thirteen games.

Carr was released from Cambridge United at the end of 2015–16 season.

=== Dulwich Hamlet ===
Following his release from Cambridge, Carr rejoined Dulwich Hamlet ahead of the 2016–17 season. On 13 August 2016, Carr made his Dulwich Hamlet return in a 2–2 draw against AFC Sudbury, playing 74 minutes before being replaced by Victor Adeboyejo. On 16 August 2016, Carr scored his first goal for Dulwich Hamlet since his spell in the 2012–13 campaign, in a 2–1 victory over Enfield Town.

On 6 January 2017, Carr joined Isthmian League Premier Division side Leatherhead on loan for an initial two-month spell. He returned to Dulwich Hamlet at the end of March 2017, amid reports that the club were negotiating a move to transfer Carr to Karlstad BK.

=== Karlstad BK ===
Carr joined Karlstad BK of the Division 2 Norra Götaland on 31 March 2017. He scored eight times in 19 league games as Karlstad finished the season in third place.

=== Shamrock Rovers ===
Carr joined Shamrock Rovers of the League of Ireland on 10 February 2018, after playing 4 trial games during pre-season and was given the number 9 jersey for the 2018 season. Carr made consecutive substitute appearances for the start of Rovers 2018 campaign against Bohemians and Dundalk FC. Carr made his first start for the club against Bray Wanderers on 26 February, when he scored his first goal for Rovers in a 6–0 win.

In the 2018–19 UEFA Europa League Carr scored at the Friends Arena against AIK Fotboll

=== Apollon Limassol ===
On 22 August 2019, Carr joined Cypriot First Division side Apollon Limassol.

=== RoPS ===
On 9 June 2020, Carr joined Finnish Veikkausliiga side RoPS.

=== Bengaluru United ===
Carr joined Bengaluru United in February 2021, scoring once in four games in the Bangalore Super Division. Carr with his compatriot Robert Primus won the 2020–21 Bangalore Super Division tournament.

=== Shelbourne ===
On 2 February 2022, it was announced that Carr had signed for League of Ireland Premier Division club Shelbourne under new manager Damien Duff.

=== Sevenoaks Town ===
He signed for Isthmian League side Sevenoaks Town in January 2023, scoring an 89th minute winner against Ashford United on his debut on 14 January 2023.

== International career ==
On 3 September 2019 Carr was called up to the Trinidad and Tobago national team for two CONCACAF Nations League matches against Martinique.

== Personal life ==
Carr is the younger brother of actor Gary Carr.

== Career statistics ==
=== Club ===
As of match played 14 January 2023

Appearances and goals by club, season and competition
Club	Season	League			National Cup		League Cup		Other		Total	
Club	Season	Division	Apps	Goals	Apps	Goals	Apps	Goals	Apps	Goals	Apps	Goals
Eastbourne Borough	2012–13	Conference South	3	0	—		—		—		3	0
Dulwich Hamlet	2012–13	IL Division One South	30	17	—		—		7 (Note: Five appearances and seven goals in Isthmian League Cup, two appearances and one goal in London Senior Cup)	8	37	25
Huddersfield Town	2013–14	Championship	2	0	—		1	0	—		3	0
Huddersfield Town	2014–15	Championship	0	0	—		0	0	—		0	0
Huddersfield Town	Total		2	0	—		1	0	—		3	0
Fleetwood Town (loan)	2013–14	League Two	4	1	0	0	—		1 (Note: Appearance in Football League Trophy)	0	5	1
Mansfield Town (loan)	2014–15	League Two	4	1	0	0	—		—		4	1
Dagenham & Redbridge (loan)	2014–15	League Two	6	0	—		—		—		6	0
Cambridge United	2015–16	League Two	4	0	0	0	1	0	1	0	6	0
Aldershot Town (loan)	2015–16	National League	7	0	—		—		1 (Note: Appearance in FA Trophy)	0	8	0
Woking (loan)	2015–16	National League	10	2	—		—		—		10	2
Dulwich Hamlet	2016–17	IL Premier Division	25	6	1	0	—		6 (Note: One appearance and one goal in Isthmian League Cup, five appearances and two goals in FA Trophy)	3	32	9
Leatherhead (loan)	2016–17	IL Premier Division	14	8	—		—		—		14	8
Shamrock Rovers	2018	League of Ireland Premier Division	34	11	0	0	0	0	2 (Note: Appearance in UEFA Europa League)	1	36	12
Shamrock Rovers	2019	League of Ireland Premier Division	23	5	0	0	0	0	3	0	26	5
Shamrock Rovers	Total		57	16	0	0	0	0	5	1	62	17
Apollon Limassol	2019–20	Cypriot First Division	4	1	0	0	—		0	0	4	1
RoPS	2020	Veikkausliiga	7	0	0	0	—		—		7	0
Bengaluru United	2020–21	Bangalore Super Division	4	1	0	0	—		—		4	1
Welling United	2021–22	National League South	8	2	1	0	—		—		9	2
Shelbourne	2022	League of Ireland Premier Division	27	2	3	2	—		—		30	4
Sevenoaks Town	2022–23	Isthmian League South East Division	1	1	—		—		—		1	1
Career total			217	58	5	2	2	0	21	12	245	71

=== International ===
As of match played 8 June 2021

Appearances and goals by national team and year
National team	Year	Apps	Goals
Trinidad and Tobago	2019	4	0
Trinidad and Tobago	2020	0	0
Trinidad and Tobago	2021	2	0
Total		6	0
