= Aaron O'Driscoll =

Irish footballer

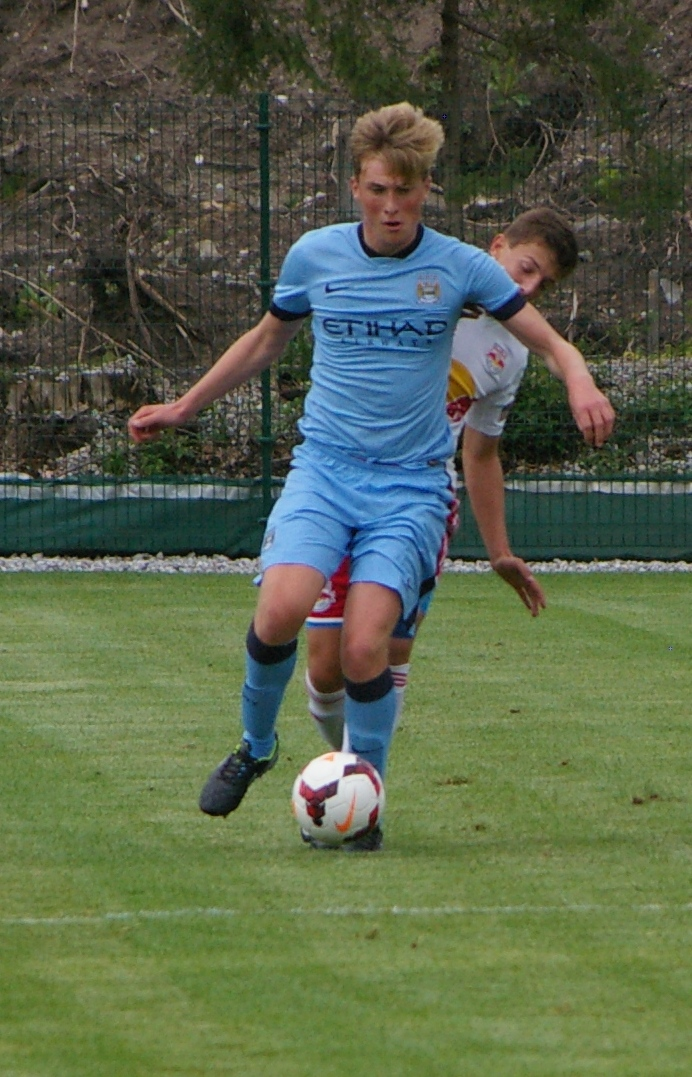
- Aaron O'Driscoll playing for Manchester City in 2014.

Personal information
- Full name: Aaron Maurice O'Driscoll
- Date of birth: 4 April 1999 (age 27)
- Place of birth: Dublin, Ireland
- Height: 1.88 m (6 ft 2 in)
- Position: Defender

Team information
- Current team: Manly United
- Number: 2

Youth career
- –2014: Cherry Orchard
- 2014–2016: Manchester City
- 2016–2020: Southampton

Senior career*
Years	Team	Apps	(Gls)
2020–2022	Mansfield Town	3	(0)
2021	→ Longford Town (loan)	36	(1)
2022	Shelbourne	25	(0)
2023	Christchurch United	17	(3)
2023–2024	Altona Magic	23	(1)
2025–	Manly United	31	(1)

International career^{‡}
2016	Republic of Ireland U17	1	(0)
- Republic of Ireland U19
- * Club domestic league appearances and goals as of 30 August 2025 ‡ National team caps and goals as of 15:03, 2 September 2020 (UTC)

Aaron Maurice O'Driscoll (born 4 April 1999) is an Irish professional footballer who plays as a defender for NPL NSW outfit Manly United.

== Club career ==
Born in Dublin, O'Driscoll played youth football for Cherry Orchard before signing for Manchester City's academy in 2014. He was released by Manchester City after two seasons at the club, having suffered an injury in his second. He signed a professional contract with Southampton in July 2016. He appeared nine times for the club's under-21 side in the EFL Trophy before being released in summer 2020.

He signed a two-year contract with League Two side Mansfield Town following a trial period with the club. He made his debut for the club on 29 August 2020 in a 4–0 EFL Trophy defeat away to Preston North End. On 26 February 2021, Aaron joined Longford Town on loan until the end of November. He made his debut for the club on 20 March 2021 in a 2–0 home win over Derry City. In a difficult season for the team which ended with Longford's relegation from the League of Ireland Premier Division, O'Driscoll played every game and was a standout performer being awarded the supporters player of the year award.

On 13 January 2022, O'Driscoll signed for League of Ireland Premier Division side Shelbourne.

On 23 March 2023, O'Driscoll joined New Zealand Southern League side Christchurch United. He scored 3 goals in 17 appearances as the club won the 2023 Southern League. On 10 September 2023 he was part of the team that won the 2023 Chatham Cup, defeating Melville United on penalties in the final.

On 27 November 2023, O'Driscoll signed for NPL Victoria side Altona Magic ahead of the 2024 season.

== International career ==
O'Driscoll made one appearance for the Republic of Ireland at under-17 level. He also played at under-19 level alongside future senior internationals including Aaron Connolly, Lee O'Connor and Dara O'Shea.

== Personal life ==
He is the son of former footballer Maurice O'Driscoll, who won the League of Ireland Premier Division with St Patrick's Athletic.

== Career statistics ==
As of match played 10 September 2023

Appearances and goals by club, season and competition
Club	Season	League			National Cup (Note: Includes FA Cup & FAI Cup)		League Cup (Note: Includes EFL Cup & League of Ireland Cup)		Other		Total	
Club	Season	Division	Apps	Goals	Apps	Goals	Apps	Goals	Apps	Goals	Apps	Goals
Southampton U21	2017–18	—			—		—		3 (Note: Appearance(s) in EFL Trophy)	0	3	0
Southampton U21	2018–19	—			—		—		3	0	3	0
Southampton U21	2019–20	—			—		—		3	0	3	0
Southampton U21	Total		0	0	0	0	0	0	9	0	9	0
Mansfield Town	2020–21	League Two	3	0	1	0	1	0	3	0	8	0
Mansfield Town	2021–22	League Two	0	0	—		—		—		0	0
Longford Town (loan)	2021	League of Ireland Premier Division	36	1	2	1	—		—		38	2
Shelbourne	2022	League of Ireland Premier Division	25	0	0	0	—		—		25	0
Christchurch United	2023	Southern League	17	3	7	1	–		–		24	4
Total			81	4	10	2	1	0	12	0	103	6

== Honours ==
Christchurch United

- Southern League: 2023
- Chatham Cup: 2023

Individual

- Mainland Football Mens Defender of the Year: 2023
- Mainland Football Mens Player of the Year: 2023
