= Mark Coyle (footballer) =

Irish footballer (born 1997)

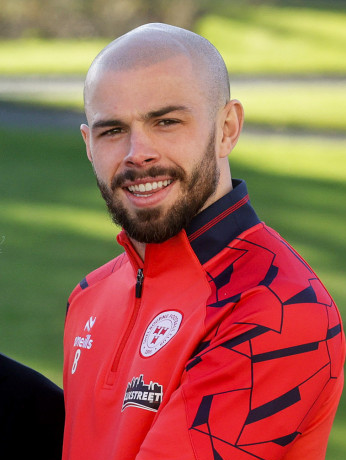
- Coyle in 2025

Personal information
- Full name: Mark Coyle
- Date of birth: 13 February 1997 (age 29)
- Place of birth: Letterkenny, County Donegal, Ireland
- Position: Defensive midfielder

Team information
- Current team: Coleraine
- Number: 24

Youth career
- 2014–2015: Finn Harps

Senior career*
Years	Team	Apps	(Gls)
2014–2016	Finn Harps	2	(0)
2017	Cockhill Celtic		
2018–2021	Finn Harps	94	(3)
2022–2026	Shelbourne	96	(5)
2026–	Coleraine	12	(1)
- * Club domestic league appearances and goals as of 29 April 2026

Mark Coyle (born 13 February 1997) is an Irish professional footballer who plays as a defensive midfielder for NIFL Premiership club Coleraine. He has previously played for Finn Harps, Cockhill Celtic and Shelbourne.

== Club career ==
=== Early career ===
Coyle was born in Letterkenny, County Donegal. He grew up in Burt. He played Gaelic football for Donegal's minor and under-21 teams which he credits for shaping him into a leader.

=== Finn Harps ===
Coyle played with Finn Harps' U19 side in 2014, and made his senior debut for the club away to Wexford Youths on 30 September 2014, his only league appearance of that season. He continued to be play with the U19 squad for the 2015 season and made one appearance in 2016, before joining Ulster Senior League club Cockhill Celtic in January 2017. He played there for a year before returning to Finn Harps in January 2018 and was included in the senior squad for their Premier Division campaign. He continued to play for the club until the end of the 2021 season, at which point he was voted Player of the Year by his teammates and fans.

=== Shelbourne ===
Coyle signed for Shelbourne on 6 December 2021. He was appointed club captain for the 2024 season. He won the 2024 League of Ireland Premier Division with the club and became the first winning League of Ireland team captain from Donegal. Coyle was an ever present in the club's 2025–26 UEFA Conference League campaign in which they reached the league phase for the first time in their history.

=== Coleraine ===
On 8 January 2026, Coyle signed for NIFL Premiership side Coleraine for an undisclosed fee, on a two-and-a-half year contract. On 2 May 2026, he was part of the side that defeated Dungannon Swifts 3–2 at Windsor Park to win the 2025–26 Irish Cup. After an impressive first 6 months with Coleraine, on 6 July 2026, Coyle was named club captain.

== Career statistics ==
As of match played 2 May 2026

Appearances and goals by club, season and competition
Club	Season	League			National Cup (Note: Includes FAI Cup & Irish Cup)		League Cup (Note: Includes League of Ireland Cup & Northern Ireland Football League Cup)		Europe		Other		Total	
Club	Season	Division	Apps	Goals	Apps	Goals	Apps	Goals	Apps	Goals	Apps	Goals	Apps	Goals
Finn Harps	2014	LOI First Division	1	0	0	0	0	0	—		—		1	0
Finn Harps	2015	LOI First Division	0	0	0	0	0	0	—		0	0	0	0
Finn Harps	2016	LOI Premier Division	1	0	0	0	0	0	—		—		1	0
Finn Harps	Total		2	0	0	0	0	0	—		0	0	2	0
Cockhill Celtic	2016–17	Ulster Senior League					—		—					
Cockhill Celtic	2017–18	Ulster Senior League					—		—					
Cockhill Celtic	Total						—		—					
Finn Harps	2018	LOI First Division	23	2	0	0	1	0	—		2 (Note: Appearance(s) in LOI Premier Division promotion/relegation play-offs)	0	26	2
Finn Harps	2019	LOI Premier Division	24	1	0	0	2	1	—		2	0	28	2
Finn Harps	2020	LOI Premier Division	14	0	3	0	—		—		—		17	0
Finn Harps	2021	LOI Premier Division	34	0	3	0	—		—		—		37	0
Finn Harps	Total		97	3	6	0	3	1	—		4	0	110	4
Shelbourne	2022	LOI Premier Division	21	1	2	0	—		—		—		23	1
Shelbourne	2023	LOI Premier Division	27	1	0	0	—		—		0	0	27	1
Shelbourne	2024	LOI Premier Division	31	2	3	0	—		3 (Note: Appearance(s) in UEFA Conference League)	1	0	0	37	3
Shelbourne	2025	LOI Premier Division	27	1	1	0	—		13 (Note: 4 appearances in the UEFA Champions League; 1 appearance in the UEFA Europa League; 8 appearances in the UEFA Conference League)	0	1 (Note: Appearance(s) in President of Ireland's Cup)	0	42	1
Shelbourne	Total		106	5	6	0	—		16	1	1	0	129	6
Coleraine	2025–26	NIFL Premiership	12	1	4	0	1	0	—		—		17	1
Coleraine	2026–27	NIFL Premiership	0	0	0	0	0	0	0	0	—		0	0
Coleraine	Total		12	1	4	0	1	0	0	0	–		17	1
Career total			215	8	16	0	4	1	16	1	5	0	257	11
