= 2023–24 Hull City A.F.C. season =

English football club season

Hull City
2023–24 season
- Owner: Acun Medya
- Chairman: Acun Ilıcalı
- Manager: Liam Rosenior (until 7 May); Tim Walter (from 31 May)
- Stadium: MKM Stadium
- EFL Championship: 7th
- FA Cup: Third round
- EFL Cup: First round
- Top goalscorer: League: Jaden Philogene (12); All: Jaden Philogene (12)
- Highest home attendance: 24,605 (v Leicester City, 9 March)
- Lowest home attendance: 19,491 (v Bristol City, 25 August)
- Average home league attendance: 21,980
- Biggest win: 4–1 (v Rotherham United, 28 November); 3–0 (v Cardiff City, 16 December); 3–0 (v Queens Park Rangers, 13 April)
- Biggest defeat: 0–3 (v Ipswich Town, 3 October)
Home colours	Away colours	Third colours

The 2023–24 season was the 120th season in the history of Hull City Association Football Club and their third consecutive season in the Championship. The club participated in the Championship, the FA Cup and the EFL Cup.

== Events ==
- On 1 July 2023, Callum Jones joined Forest Green Rovers on a season-long loan.
- On 2 July 2023, Liam Delap joined from Manchester City.
- On 3 July 2023, goalkeeper Owen Foster signed a two-year deal for the under-21 squad from Scunthorpe United for an undisclosed fee.
- On 4 July 2023, Harvey Cartwright joined Grimsby Town on a season-long loan.
- On 4 July 2023, Joseph Johnson joined on a one-year deal following his release from Huddersfield Town.
- On 5 July 2023, Nathan Tinsdale joined on a one-year deal from Bradford City.
- On 6 July 2023, Harry Wood joined Shelbourne on loan until 13 November 2023.
- On 6 July 2023, Ajay Weston joined on a one-year deal from Huddersfield Town for an undisclosed fee.
- On 7 July 2023, Rajdeep Palit joined on a one-year deal from Bradford City for an undisclosed fee.
- On 11 July 2023, Tobias Figueiredo moved to Brazilian club Fortaleza for an undisclosed fee.
- On 18 July 2023, Jason Lokilo joined from Sparta Rotterdam on a two-year deal for an undisclosed fee.
- On 18 July 2023, Jake Leake joined Tranmere Rovers on a season-long loan spell.
- On 20 July 2023, Rúben Vinagre joined on a season-long loan spell from Sporting CP, but on 26 January 2024, he was recalled by Sporting CP.
- On 24 July 2023, Tom Nixon joined Doncaster Rovers on a season-long loan spell.
- On 28 July 2023, Will Jarvis joined Shelbourne on loan until the end of the year.
- On 29 July 2023, Chad Gribble joined as a Professional Development Phase Coach.
- On 31 July 2023, Henry Sandat joined from Southend United on a two-year deal for an undisclosed fee.
- On 1 August 2023, Ben Voase moved to NC State Wolfpack on a free transfer.
- On 2 August 2023, Aaron Connolly signed a one-year deal with Hull City for an undisclosed fee.
- On 10 August 2023, Benjamin Tetteh moved to Metz for an undisclosed fee.
- On 17 August 2023, Scott Twine joined on a season-long loan from Burnley, but on 15 January 2024 Twine was recalled by Burnley.
- On 21 August 2023, Tyrell Sellars-Fleming joined on a two-year deal from Scunthorpe United for an undisclosed fee.
- On 25 August 2023, Ryan Woods moved to Bristol Rovers on a season-long loan, but was cut-short when he returned to Hull on 10 January 2024.
- On 30 August 2023, Ryan Allsop joined on a two-year deal from Cardiff City for an undisclosed fee.
- On 1 September 2023, James Furlong joined on a three-year deal from Brighton & Hove Albion for an undisclosed fee.
- On 1 September 2023, Jaden Philogene joined on a three-year deal from Aston Villa for an undisclosed fee.
- On 1 September 2023, Óscar Estupiñán moved to FC Metz on a season-long loan, but on 1 February 2024, Estupiñán was recalled by Hull City.
- On 1 September 2023, Brandon Fleming moved to Shrewsbury Town on a season-long loan, but on 2 February 2024, Fleming returned to Hull City.
- On 1 September 2023, Ryan Longman joined Millwall on a season-long loan.
- On 1 September 2023, Xavier Simons joined Fleetwood Town on a season-long loan.
- On 1 September 2023, Bora Aydınlık joined from Fenerbahçe S.K. on a season-long loan.
- On 1 September 2023, Tyler Morton joined from Liverpool on a season-long loan.
- On 29 September 2023, David Robson joined Darlington on a month-long loan spell.
- On 6 October 2023, Andy Smith signed a new three-year contract with the club.
- On 20 October 2023, Jim Simms moved on a month-long loan spell to Darlington.
- On 27 October 2023, Olly Green joined York City on a month-long loan.
- On 7 December 2023, Rocco Coyle and Stan Ashbee signed three-year professional contracts with the club.
- On 20 December 2023, announced that Billy Sharp would be joining from LA Galaxy on a free transfer on 1 January 2024. He would be with the club until the end of the 2023–24 season.
- On 17 December 2023, Hull City announced that Liam Rosenior had signed a new three-year contract, keeping him at the club until 2026.
- On 23 December 2023, Sincere Hall went on a month-long loan spell to Guiseley.
- On 23 December 2023, Henry Sandat went on a month-long loan spell to Southend United, before his loan-spell was extended for the remainder of the season on 23 January 2024.
- On 23 December 2023, Jim Simms went on a month-long loan spell to Ashton United.
- On 23 December 2023, Jake Brown went on a month-long loan spell to Bridlington Town.
- On 29 December 2023, Nick Barmby was announced as the next member of the club's Hall of Fame and would be inducted at the first home league game of 2024 against Norwich City.
- On 9 January 2024, Alfie Taylor went on a season-long loan spell to St Patrick's Athletic.
- On 10 January 2024, Fábio Carvalho joined on loan from Liverpool for the rest of the season.
- On 12 January 2024, Harry Wood joined Grimsby Town on loan for the remainder of the season.
- On 20 January 2024, Ivor Pandur from Fortuna Sittard signed a three-and-a-half-year deal for an undisclosed fee.
- On 24 January 2024, Andy Smith moved to Cheltenham Town on loan until the end of the season.
- On 30 January 2024, Ryan Giles joined on loan from Luton Town for the remainder of the season.
- On 30 January 2024, Will Jarvis returned on loan to Shelbourne for the 2024 League of Ireland Premier Division season.
- On 30 January 2024, Noah Ohio joined on loan from Standard Liège for the remainder of the season.
- On 30 January 2024, Callum Yam signed from Sheffield United on a one-and-a-half-year deal for the Academy.
- On 31 January 2024, Jason Lokilo moved on loan to F.C. Vizela for the remainder of the season.
- On 31 January 2024, Allahyar Sayyadmanesh left for Westerlo on a permanent deal for an undisclosed fee.
- On 1 February 2024, Thimothée Lo-Tutala moved on loan to Doncaster Rovers for the rest of the season.
- On 1 February 2024, Ryan Woods moved on loan to Exeter City for the rest of the season.
- On 1 February 2024, Abdülkadir Ömür of Trabzonspor signed a three-and-a-half-year deal for an undisclosed fee.
- On 1 February 2024, Harry Vaughan moved on loan to Bristol Rovers for the rest of the season.
- On 1 February 2024, Anass Zaroury joined on loan from Burnley for the rest of the season.
- On 1 February 2024, Doğukan Sinik joined Hatayspor on loan until the end of the season.
- On 9 February 2024, Óscar Estupiñán moved on loan to Esporte Clube Bahia for the rest of the season.
- On 10 February 2024, Owen Foster moved to Chorley on a month-long-loan.
- On 22 February 2024, Jevon Mills moved to Bohemian on loan until the end of the season.
- On 26 February 2024, David Robson joined Gainsborough Trinity on a month-long loan.
- On 1 March 2024, Matty Jacob signed a new three-year contract with the club.
- On 9 March 2024, Jim Simms has his contract with the club terminated by mutual consent so he could join Wythenshawe Town.
- On 7 May 2024, after a seventh-place finish in the 2023–24 season caused the team to narrowly miss out on the play-offs, manager Rosenior was sacked. Hull City owner, Acun Ilicali said that Rosenior had been sacked over a difference on football philosophy between the two with Ilicali wanting attacking football and Rosenior unable to offer that as a manager.
- On 31 May 2024, Tim Walter was appointed as the new manager of the club and would take up the post on 1 July 2024.
- On 3 June 2024, Head of Recruitment, Lee Darnbrough left the club to take up a similar role with Stoke City.
- On 7 June 2024, vice chairman Tan Kesler was appointed to the board of the English Football League as a representative of the Championship clubs.
- On 11 June 2024, Tom Nixon joined Doncaster Rovers on a three-year deal.
- On 18 June 2024, Ryan Allsop signed a three-year deal with Birmingham City for an undisclosed fee.
- On 27 June 2024, Ozan Tufan moved to Trabzonspor for an undisclosed fee.
- On 27 June 2024, Hull City triggered their option to sign Ryan Giles from Luton Town, following his loan spell with the club. Giles has signed a three-year deal with the club for an undisclosed fee.

== Coaching staff ==
Position	Name
Head coach	(England) Liam Rosenior
Assistant head coach	(England) Justin Walker
First team coach	(England) Andy Dawson
Goalkeeping coach	(England) Barry Richardson
Coach Analyst	(England) Ben Warner

Source: Hull City A.F.C.

== Squad ==
#	Name	Position	Nationality	Place of birth	Date of birth (age) (Note: Players' ages listed as they were on 1 July 2023, the official start date of the 2023–24 season)	Previous club	Date signed	Fee (Note: All fees converted into GBP)	Contract end
Goalkeepers
1	Matt Ingram	GK	(England)	High Wycombe	18 December 1993 (age 29)	Queens Park Rangers	1 July 2019	Free	30 June 2025
17	Ryan Allsop	GK	(England)	Birmingham	17 June 1992 (age 31)	(Wales) Cardiff City	30 August 2023	£800,000	30 June 2025
30	Ivor Pandur	GK	(Croatia)	Rijeka	25 March 2000 (age 23)	(Netherlands) Fortuna Sittard	20 January 2024	£1,500,000	30 June 2027
Defenders
2	Lewie Coyle (c)	RB	(England)	Hull	15 October 1995 (age 27)	Fleetwood Town	7 August 2020	£350,000	30 June 2026
3	Ryan Giles	LB	(England)	Telford	26 January 2000 (age 23)	Luton Town	30 January 2024	Loan	30 June 2024
4	Jacob Greaves	CB	(England)	Cottingham	12 September 2000 (age 22)	Academy	1 July 2020	—	30 June 2026
5	Alfie Jones	CB	(England)	Bristol	7 October 1997 (age 25)	Southampton	4 September 2020	Undisclosed	30 June 2026
6	Sean McLoughlin	CB	(Republic of Ireland)	Cork	13 September 1996 (age 26)	(Republic of Ireland) Cork City	26 July 2019	£225,000	30 June 2026
21	Brandon Fleming	LB	(England)	Hull	3 December 1999 (age 23)	Academy	1 July 2019	—	30 June 2025
25	James Furlong	LB	(Republic of Ireland)	Dublin	7 June 2002 (age 21)	Brighton & Hove Albion	1 September 2023	Undisclosed	30 June 2026
29	Matty Jacob	LB	(England)	Barnsley	3 June 2001 (age 22)	Academy	1 July 2019	—	30 June 2027
33	Cyrus Christie	RB	(Republic of Ireland)	(England) Coventry	30 September 1992 (age 30)	Fulham	26 August 2022	Free	30 June 2024
43	Stan Ashbee	CB	(Republic of Ireland)	(England) Hull	28 November 2006 (age 16)	Academy	7 December 2023	—	30 June 2026
Midfielders
7	Ozan Tufan	AM	(Turkey)	Orhaneli	23 March 1995 (age 28)	(Turkey) Fenerbahçe	1 July 2022	£3,000,000	30 June 2025
8	Greg Docherty	CM	(Scotland)	Milngavie	10 September 1996 (age 26)	(Scotland) Rangers	20 August 2020	£400,000	30 June 2024
10	Adama Traoré	AM	(Mali)	Bamako	28 June 1995 (age 28)	(Turkey) Hatayspor	1 September 2022	Free	30 June 2024
15	Tyler Morton	DM	(England)	Wallasey	31 October 2002 (age 20)	Liverpool	1 September 2023	Loan	30 June 2024
24	Jean Michaël Seri	CM	(Ivory Coast)	Grand-Béréby	19 July 1991 (age 31)	Fulham	8 July 2022	Free	30 June 2025
27	Regan Slater	CM	(England)	Gleadless	11 September 1999 (age 23)	Sheffield United	27 January 2022	£50,000	30 June 2026
45	Fábio Carvalho	AM	(Portugal)	Torres Vedras	30 August 2002 (age 23)	Liverpool	10 January 2024	Loan	30 June 2026
50	Abdülkadir Ömür	AM	(Turkey)	Çarşıbaşı	25 June 1999 (age 24)	(Turkey) Trabzonspor	1 February 2024	£2,000,000	30 June 2027
Forwards
9	Noah Ohio	CF	(Netherlands)	Almere	16 January 2003 (age 23)	(Belgium) Standard Liège	30 January 2024	Loan	30 June 2024
12	Billy Sharp	CF	(England)	Sheffield	5 February 1986 (age 37)	(United States) LA Galaxy	1 January 2024	Free	30 June 2024
20	Liam Delap	CF	(England)	Winchester	8 February 2003 (age 20)	Manchester City	2 July 2023	Loan	30 June 2024
23	Jaden Philogene	LW	(England)	Hammersmith	8 February 2002 (age 21)	Aston Villa	1 September 2023	£5,000,000	30 June 2026
31	Vaughn Covil	RW	(United States)	San Diego	26 July 2023 (age 19)	Forest Green Rovers	6 July 2022	Free	30 June 2024
41	Tyrell Sellars-Fleming	CF	(England)	Lincoln	31 May 2005 (age 18)	Scunthorpe United	21 August 2023	Free	30 June 2025
44	Aaron Connolly	CF	(Republic of Ireland)	Oranmore	28 January 2000 (age 23)	Brighton & Hove Albion	2 August 2023	£1,150,000	30 June 2024
47	Anass Zaroury	LW	(Morocco)	(Belgium) Mechelen	7 November 2000 (age 22)	Burnley	1 February 2024	Loan	31 May 2024

=== Out on loan ===
#	Name	Position	Nationality	Place of birth	Date of birth (age)	Previous club	Date signed	Fee	Contract end
11	Doğukan Sinik	LW	(Turkey)	Antalya	21 January 1999 (age 24)	(Turkey) Antalyaspor	20 July 2022	£4,000,000	30 June 2025
14	Harry Vaughan	AM	(Republic of Ireland)	(England) Trafford	6 April 2004 (age 19)	Oldham Athletic	31 January 2023	Youth Fee	30 June 2026
16	Ryan Longman	RW	(England)	Redhill	6 November 2000 (age 22)	Brighton & Hove Albion	31 January 2022	£800,000	30 June 2025
18	Xavier Simons	DM	(England)	Hammersmith	20 February 2003 (age 20)	Chelsea	1 July 2023	Undisclosed	30 June 2026
19	Óscar Estupiñán	CF	(Colombia)	Cali	29 December 1996 (age 26)	(Portugal) Vitoria de Guimarães	13 July 2022	Free	30 June 2025
22	Jason Lokilo	RW	(Democratic Republic of the Congo)	(Belgium) Brussels	17 September 1998 (age 24)	(Netherlands) Sparta Rotterdam	18 July 2023	Undisclosed	30 June 2025
26	Andy Smith	CB	(England)	Banbury	11 September 2001 (age 21)	Academy	1 July 2021	—	30 June 2026
28	Callum Jones	CM	(Wales)	(England) Birkenhead	5 April 2001 (age 22)	Bury	20 August 2019	Youth Fee	30 June 2025
32	Thimothée Lo-Tutala	GK	(France)	Gonesse	13 February 2003 (age 20)	Tottenham Hotspur	9 August 2022	Free	30 June 2025
34	David Robson	GK	(Wales)	(England) Northallerton	22 January 2002 (age 21)	Academy	1 July 2022	—	30 June 2024
—	Harvey Cartwright	GK	(England)	Grimsby	9 May 2002 (age 21)	Academy	1 July 2021	—	30 June 2026
—	Yuriel Celi	CM	(Peru)	Callao	20 February 2002 (age 21)	(Peru) Mannucci	31 January 2023	Undisclosed	30 June 2025
—	Will Jarvis	RW	(England)	York	17 December 2002 (age 20)	Academy	1 July 2021	—	30 June 2026
—	Ryan Woods	DM	(England)	Norton Canes	13 December 1993 (age 29)	Birmingham City	18 August 2022	Undisclosed	30 June 2025

== Transfers ==
=== In ===
Date	Pos	Player	Transferred from	Fee	Ref
1 July 2023	DM	(England) Xavier Simons	(England) Chelsea	Undisclosed	
3 July 2023	GK	(England) Owen Foster †	(England) Scunthorpe United	Undisclosed	
4 July 2023	DF	(England) Joseph Johnson †	(England) Huddersfield Town	Free	
5 July 2023	DF	(England) Nathan Tinsdale †	(England) Bradford City	Undisclosed	
6 July 2023	DF	(England) Ajay Weston †	(England) Huddersfield Town	Undisclosed	
7 July 2023	MF	(England) Rajdeep Palit †	(England) Bradford City	Undisclosed	
18 July 2023	RW	(Democratic Republic of the Congo) Jason Lokilo	(Netherlands) Sparta Rotterdam	Undisclosed	
31 July 2023	CF	(England) Henry Sandat †	(England) Southend United	Undisclosed	
2 August 2023	CF	(Republic of Ireland) Aaron Connolly	(England) Brighton & Hove Albion	Undisclosed	
21 August 2023	FW	(England) Tyrell Sellars-Fleming †	(England) Scunthorpe United	Undisclosed	
30 August 2023	GK	(England) Ryan Allsop	(Wales) Cardiff City	Undisclosed	
1 September 2023	LB	(Republic of Ireland) James Furlong	(England) Brighton & Hove Albion	Undisclosed	
1 September 2023	LW	(England) Jaden Philogene	(England) Aston Villa	Undisclosed	
1 January 2024	CF	(England) Billy Sharp	(United States) LA Galaxy	Free	
20 January 2024	GK	(Croatia) Ivor Pandur	(Netherlands) Fortuna Sittard	Undisclosed	
20 January 2024	GK	(England) Callum Yam †	(England) Sheffield United	Undisclosed	
1 February 2024	AM	(Turkey) Abdülkadir Ömür	(Turkey) Trabzonspor	Undisclosed	
27 June 2024	LB	(England) Ryan Giles	(England) Luton Town	Undisclosed	

† Signed for Under-21s

=== Out ===
Date	Pos	Player	Transferred to	Fee	Ref
30 June 2023	CF	(England) Billy Chadwick	(England) Stockport County	Released	
30 June 2023	RB	(England) Louie Chorlton	(England) Pontefract Collieries	Released	
30 June 2023	LB	(Australia) Callum Elder	(England) Derby County	End of Contract	
30 June 2023	GK	(England) Harry Fisk	(Republic of Ireland) Shelbourne	Free Transfer	
30 June 2023	CF	(England) Josh Hinds	Free agent	Released	
30 June 2023	CM	(England) Harry Lovick	(England) Gainsborough Trinity	Released	
30 June 2023	GK	(England) Thomas MacAuley	Free agent	Released	
30 June 2023	CF	(England) Tyler Smith	(England) Bradford City	Released	
30 June 2023	LW	(England) McCauley Snelgrove	(England) Gainsborough Trinity	Released	
30 June 2023	CM	(England) Harry Wallis	Free agent	Released	
11 July 2023	CB	(Portugal) Tobias Figueiredo	(Brazil) Fortaleza	Undisclosed	
1 August 2023	GK	(England) Ben Voase	(United States) NC State Wolfpack	Free Transfer	
10 August 2023	CF	(Ghana) Benjamin Tetteh	(France) FC Metz	Undisclosed	
31 January 2024	LW	(Iran) Allahyar Sayyadmanesh	(Belgium) Westerlo	Undisclosed	
9 March 2024	CF	(England) Jim Simms	(England) Wythenshawe Town	Mutual Consent	
11 June 2024	RB	(England) Tom Nixon	(England) Doncaster Rovers	Undisclosed	
18 June 2024	GK	(England) Ryan Allsop	(England) Birmingham City	Undisclosed	
27 June 2024	CM	(Turkey) Ozan Tufan	(Turkey) Trabzonspor	Undisclosed	

=== Loaned in ===
Date	Pos	Player	Loaned from	Date until	Ref
2 July 2023	CF	(England) Liam Delap	(England) Manchester City	End of Season	
20 July 2023	LB	(Portugal) Rúben Vinagre	(Portugal) Sporting CP	26 January 2024 (Note: On 26 January, Vinagre was recalled by Sporting CP.)	
17 August 2023	AM	(England) Scott Twine	(England) Burnley	15 January 2024 (Note: On 15 January, Twine was recalled by Burnley.)	
1 September 2023	LW	(Turkey) Bora Aydınlık	(Turkey) Fenerbahçe	End of Season	
1 September 2023	DM	(England) Tyler Morton	(England) Liverpool	End of Season	
10 January 2024	AM	(Portugal) Fábio Carvalho	(England) Liverpool	End of Season	
30 January 2024	LB	(England) Ryan Giles	(England) Luton Town	End of Season	
30 January 2024	CF	(Netherlands) Noah Ohio	(Belgium) Standard Liège	End of Season	
1 February 2024	LW	(Morocco) Anass Zaroury	(England) Burnley	End of Season	

=== Loaned out ===
Date	Pos	Player	Loaned to	Date until	Ref
31 January 2023	CM	(Peru) Yuriel Celi	(Peru) Club Universitario de Deportes	31 December 2023	
1 July 2023	CM	(Wales) Callum Jones	(England) Forest Green Rovers	End of Season	
4 July 2023	GK	(England) Harvey Cartwright	(England) Grimsby Town	End of Season	
6 July 2023	CM	(England) Harry Wood	(Republic of Ireland) Shelbourne	13 November 2023	
18 July 2023	LB	(England) Jake Leake	(England) Tranmere Rovers	End of Season	
24 July 2023	RB	(England) Tom Nixon	(England) Doncaster Rovers	End of Season	
28 July 2023	CF	(England) Will Jarvis	(Republic of Ireland) Shelbourne	31 December 2023	
25 August 2023	DM	(England) Ryan Woods	(England) Bristol Rovers	10 January 2024	
1 September 2023	CF	(Colombia) Óscar Estupiñán	(France) FC Metz	1 February 2024 (Note: On 1 February, Estupiñán was recalled by Hull City.)	
1 September 2023	LB	(England) Brandon Fleming	(England) Shrewsbury Town	2 February 2024 (Note: On 2 February, Fleming returned to Hull City.)	
1 September 2023	RW	(England) Ryan Longman	(England) Millwall	End of Season	
1 September 2023	DM	(England) Xavier Simons	(England) Fleetwood Town	End of Season	
29 September 2023	GK	(Wales) David Robson	(England) Darlington	28 October 2023	
20 October 2023	CF	(England) Jim Simms	(England) Darlington	19 November 2023	
27 October 2023	MF	(England) Olly Green	(England) York City	27 November 2023	
23 December 2023	LW	(Bermuda) Sincere Hall	(England) Guiseley	20 January 2024	
23 December 2023	CF	(England) Henry Sandat	(England) Southend United	End of Season	
23 December 2023	CF	(England) Jim Simms	(England) Ashton United	23 January 2024	
23 December 2023	FW	(England) Jake Brown	(England) Bridlington Town	23 January 2024	
9 January 2024	DF	(England) Alfie Taylor	(Republic of Ireland) St Patrick's Athletic	End of Season	
12 January 2024	CM	(England) Harry Wood	(England) Grimsby Town	End of Season	
24 January 2024	CB	(England) Andy Smith	(England) Cheltenham Town	End of Season	
30 January 2024	CF	(England) Will Jarvis	(Republic of Ireland) Shelbourne	30 November 2024	
31 January 2024	RW	(Democratic Republic of the Congo) Jason Lokilo	(Portugal) F.C. Vizela	End of Season	
1 February 2024	GK	(France) Thimothée Lo-Tutala	(England) Doncaster Rovers	End of Season	
1 February 2024	LW	(Turkey) Doğukan Sinik	(Turkey) Hatayspor	End of Season	
1 February 2024	DM	(England) Ryan Woods	(England) Exeter City	End of Season	
1 February 2024	AM	(Republic of Ireland) Harry Vaughan	(England) Bristol Rovers	End of Season	
9 February 2024	CF	(Colombia) Óscar Estupiñán	(Brazil) Esporte Clube Bahia	End of Season	
10 February 2024	GK	(England) Owen Foster	(England) Chorley	10 March 2024	
22 February 2024	CB	(Republic of Ireland) Jevon Mills	(Republic of Ireland) Bohemian	End of Season	
26 February 2024	GK	(Wales) David Robson	(England) Gainsborough Trinity	26 March 2024	

== Pre-season and friendlies ==
On 31 May, Hull City announced a trio of pre-season friendlies, against Grimsby Town, Barnsley and Bradford City. A fourth fixture was confirmed in late-June, against Scunthorpe United.

The players reported back for the start of pre-season on 26 June 2023 and flew to Istanbul, Turkey, on 2 July, for a warm-weather training camp. Matches against Galatasaray and Hatayspor were planned for the time in Turkey.

The final pre-season friendly match would be at home to French side Nantes on 29 July 2023.

The final international break saw the team return to Turkey on 18 March 2024 for a five-day training camp. A friendly against Curaçao took place on 21 March.

Win Draw Loss Fixtures

5 July 2023 Friendly	Galatasaray	3–4	Hull City	İzmit, Turkey
19:30 TRT	Bayram 28'; Kutlu 30'; Ayhan 35'	Report	Tetteh 45+1'; Slater (yellow card) 71', (goal) 85'; Christie 83'; Estupiñán 86'	Stadium: Kocaeli Stadium; Attendance: 35,000

9 July 2023 Friendly	Hatayspor	1–1	Hull City	Bursa, Turkey
18:30 TRT	Durmushan 83'	Report	Jarvis 68'	Stadium: Sütaş Timsah Park

15 July 2023 Friendly	Grimsby Town	1–2	Hull City	Cleethorpes
15:00 BST	Wilson 98'	Report	Slater 54'; Longman 69'	Stadium: Blundell Park; Attendance: 4,503; Referee: Geoff Eltringham
Note: Played 4 x 30 minute periods, with 2 sets of players playing 60 minutes.

18 July 2023 Friendly	Hull City	1–0	Barnsley	Kingston upon Hull
19:45 BST	Jarvis 30'	Report		Stadium: MKM Stadium; Attendance: 4,548; Referee: Oliver Langford

22 July 2023 Friendly	Bradford City	1–1	Hull City	Bradford
15:00 BST	Stubbs 90'	Report	Slater 21'	Stadium: University of Bradford Stadium; Attendance: 3,411

25 July 2023 Friendly	Scunthorpe United	1–1	Hull City	Scunthorpe
19:45 BST	Shrimpton 10'	Report	Tufan 51'	Stadium: Glanford Park; Attendance: 2,414

29 July 2023 Friendly	Hull City	1–1	Nantes	Kingston upon Hull
15:00 BST	Tufan 60'	Report	Simon 70'	Stadium: MKM Stadium; Attendance: 4,893

21 March 2024 Friendly	Hull City	0–1	Curaçao	Antalya, Turkey
		Report	Janga 35'	Stadium: Antalya Stadium

== Competitions ==
=== Overall record ===
Competition	First match	Last match	Starting round	Final position	Record							
Competition	First match	Last match	Starting round	Final position	Pld	W	D	L	GF	GA	GD	Win %
Championship	5 August 2023	4 May 2024	Matchday 1	7th	46	19	13	14	68	60	+8	41.30
FA Cup	6 January 2024	16 January 2024	Third round	Third round	2	0	1	1	2	3	−1	0.00
EFL Cup	8 August 2023		First round	First round	1	0	0	1	1	2	−1	0.00
Total					49	19	14	16	71	65	+6	38.78

Source: Soccerway

=== Championship ===
League fixtures were announced on 22 June 2023, with Hull City set to start the season on 5 August 2023 with an away fixture at Carrow Road against Norwich City, and to finish it on 4 May 2024 with an away trip to Home Park to face Plymouth Argyle.

==== League table ====
Pos	Team	Pld	W	D	L	GF	GA	GD	Pts	Promotion, qualification or relegation
4	Southampton (O, P)	46	26	9	11	87	63	+24	87	Qualified for the Championship play-offs
5	West Bromwich Albion	46	21	12	13	70	47	+23	75	Qualified for the Championship play-offs
6	Norwich City	46	21	10	15	79	64	+15	73	Qualified for the Championship play-offs
7	Hull City	46	19	13	14	68	60	+8	70	
8	Middlesbrough	46	20	9	17	71	62	+9	69	
9	Coventry City	46	17	13	16	70	59	+11	64	
10	Preston North End	46	18	9	19	56	67	−11	63	

Source: EFL official website
Rules for classification: 1) Points; 2) Goal difference; 3) Number of goals scored; 4) Head-to-head results; 5) Wins; 6) Away goals; 7) Penalty points (sec 9.5); 8) Number of 12-point sending off offences; 9) Play-off (only if needed to determine promotion/relegation)
(O) Play-off winners; (P) Promoted

==== Results summary ====
Overall								Home						Away					
Pld	W	D	L	GF	GA	GD	Pts	W	D	L	GF	GA	GD	W	D	L	GF	GA	GD
46	19	13	14	68	60	+8	70	8	9	6	35	27	+8	11	4	8	33	33	0

Source: Soccerway

==== Results by round ====
Round	1	2	3	4	5	6	7	8	9	10	11	12	13	14	15	16	17	18	19	20	21	22	23	24	25	26	27	28	29	30	31	32	33	34	35	36	37	38	39	40	41	42	43	44	45	46
Ground	A	H	A	H	A	H	H	A	H	A	A	H	A	H	A	H	A	H	H	A	A	H	A	H	H	A	H	A	H	H	A	A	A	H	A	H	H	H	A	A	H	H	A	A	H	A
Result	L	W	W	D	W	D	D	W	D	L	D	L	W	W	L	W	D	W	L	L	W	W	L	L	W	L	L	W	W	L	W	W	W	D	D	D	D	L	L	W	D	W	D	W	D	L
Position	17	12	7	8	6	5	6	4	5	9	9	12	8	7	9	8	8	6	6	8	7	6	6	7	6	7	9	6	6	8	8	8	6	6	6	6	7	9	10	9	10	7	7	7	7	7

Source: Soccerway
A = Away; H = Home; W = Win; D = Draw; L = Loss; P = Postponed

==== Matches ====
Win Draw Loss Fixtures

5 August 2023 1	Norwich City	2–1	Hull City	Norwich
15:00 BST	Gibson (yellow card) 34'; Rowe 45+3'; Duffy (yellow card) 90'; Idah 90+6'	Report	Delap 17'; Greaves (yellow card) 27'; Traoré (yellow card) 30'; Vinagre (yellow card) 34'; Seri (yellow card) 41'; Ingram (yellow card) 90+5'	Stadium: Carrow Road; Attendance: 25,892; Referee: Keith Stroud

12 August 2023 2	Hull City	4–2	Sheffield Wednesday	Kingston upon Hull
15:00 BST	Tufan 45+5' (pen.), 58', 70'; Connolly 75'; Traoré (yellow card) 90'	Report	Paterson (yellow card) 26'; Delgado 36'; Windass (yellow card) 44'; Gregory (yellow card) 45+4'; Smith 90+4'	Stadium: MKM Stadium; Attendance: 20,410; Referee: Matt Donohue

19 August 2023 3	Blackburn Rovers	1–2	Hull City	Blackburn
15:00 BST	Pickering (red card) 17'; Buckley (yellow card) 67'; Gallagher 74', (yellow card) 83'	Report	Greaves (yellow card) 41'; Traoré (yellow card) 43'; Lokilo (yellow card) 67'; Connolly 81', 88'	Stadium: Ewood Park; Attendance: 13,943; Referee: Oliver Langford

25 August 2023 4	Hull City	1–1	Bristol City	Kingston upon Hull
19:30 BST	Greaves (yellow card) 9'; Tufan 17'	Report	Wells 62', (yellow card) 65'; Gardner-Hickman (yellow card) 82'	Stadium: MKM Stadium; Attendance: 19,491; Referee: James Linington

2 September 2023 5	Leicester City	0–1	Hull City	Leicester
15:00 BST	Winks (yellow card) 55'; Vestergaard (yellow card) 58'; Fatawu (yellow card) 90+4'	Report	Jones (yellow card) 2'; Coyle (yellow card) 7'; Delap 15', (yellow card) 40'; Vinagre (yellow card) 60'; Greaves (yellow card) 75'; Sayyadmanesh (yellow card) 90+1'	Stadium: King Power Stadium; Attendance: 31,318; Referee: John Busby

15 September 2023 6	Hull City	1–1	Coventry City	Kingston upon Hull
19:45 BST	Connolly 87', (yellow card) 90'; Delap (yellow card) 90+2'	Report	Latibeaudiere 27', (yellow card) 89'; McFadzean (yellow card) 81'; Bidwell (yellow card) 83'; Eccles (yellow card) 85'; Binks (yellow card) 90'	Stadium: MKM Stadium; Attendance: 21,888; Referee: Tony Harrington

20 September 2023 7	Hull City	0–0	Leeds United	Kingston upon Hull
19:45 BST	Twine (yellow card) 54'; Connolly (yellow card) 69'; Philogene (yellow card) 80'	Report	Rodon (yellow card) 43' (yellow-red card) 60'; Ampadu (yellow card) 52'	Stadium: MKM Stadium; Attendance: 24,221; Referee: Stephen Martin

24 September 2023 8	Stoke City	1–3	Hull City	Stoke-on-Trent
12:00 BST	Wilmot (yellow card) 42'; Laurent (yellow card) 75'; Vidigal 77'	Report	Connolly 30'; Traoré 32'; Jones (yellow card) 38'; Seri (yellow card) 45+4'; Greaves (yellow card) 55'; Slater 73'	Stadium: bet365 Stadium; Attendance: 21,142; Referee: Thomas Bramall

30 September 2023 9	Hull City	1–1	Plymouth Argyle	Kingston upon Hull
15:00 BST	Slater 44'; Christie (yellow card) 90'; Delap (yellow card) 90+4'	Report	Randell 22'; Azaz (yellow card) 47'; Pleguezuelo (yellow card) 77'	Stadium: MKM Stadium; Attendance: 20,312; Referee: David Webb

3 October 2023 10	Ipswich Town	3–0	Hull City	Ipswich
19:45 BST	Burns 5'; Chaplin 41'; Harness 65'	Report		Stadium: Portman Road; Attendance: 27,070; Referee: Matt Donohue

7 October 2023 11	Millwall	2–2	Hull City	Bermondsey
15:00 BST	Watmore 8'; McNamara (yellow card) 9'; Harding (yellow card) 36' de Norre (yellow card) 52'; Bryan 54', (yellow card) 90+1'	Report	Philogene 25'; Traoré 30'; Allsop (yellow card) 51'; Connolly (yellow card) 72'	Stadium: The Den; Attendance: 15,204; Referee: Tim Robinson

21 October 2023 12	Hull City	1–2	Southampton	Kingston upon Hull
15:00 BST	Delap 25'; Philogene (yellow card) 45+1'; Christie (yellow card) 46'; Morton (yellow card) 52'; Sayyadmanesh (yellow card) 90+5'	Report	Smallbone 20'; Manning (yellow card) 39'; Alcaraz (yellow card) 48'; Fraser (yellow card) 90+3', (goal) 90+5'	Stadium: MKM Stadium; Attendance: 21,524; Referee: Geoff Eltringham

25 October 2023 13	Birmingham City	0–2	Hull City	Bordesley
19:45 BST	Long (yellow card) 55'; Bacuna (yellow card) 90+3'	Report	Delap 12', (yellow card) 55'; Philogene 74'	Stadium: St Andrew's; Attendance: 19,530; Referee: John Busby

28 October 2023 14	Hull City	1–0	Preston North End	Kingston upon Hull
15:00 BST	Lokilo (yellow card) 46'; Philogene 68'; Seri (yellow card) 77'	Report	Cunningham (yellow card) 18'; Holmes (yellow card) 55'; Potts (yellow card) 59'; Best (yellow card) 90+3'	Stadium: MKM Stadium; Attendance: 24,267; Referee: Martin Woods

4 November 2023 15	West Bromwich Albion	3–1	Hull City	West Bromwich
15:00 GMT	Wallace 14'; Bartley (yellow card) 45+4'; Phillips 65'; Ajayi 71'	Report	Coyle 41'; Seri (yellow card) 45+3'	Stadium: The Hawthorns; Attendance: 23,333; Referee: Andrew Kitchen

11 November 2023 16	Hull City	1–0	Huddersfield Town	Kingston upon Hull
15:00 GMT	Tufan (yellow card) 75'; Delap 90+2'; Docherty (yellow card) 90+9'	Report	Thomas (yellow card) 20'; Edmonds-Green (yellow card) 22'; Nicholls (yellow card) 63'	Stadium: MKM Stadium; Attendance: 20,630; Referee: Matt Donohue

25 November 2023 17	Swansea City	2–2	Hull City	Landore
15:00 GMT	Paterson 17'; Yates 23'	Report	Philogene 48'; Greaves (yellow card) 60'; Morton 68'; Twine (yellow card) 89'	Stadium: Swansea.com Stadium; Attendance: 14,864; Referee: Dean Whitestone

28 November 2023 18	Hull City	4–1	Rotherham United	Kingston upon Hull
19:45 GMT	Morton 5'; Philogene 9', 48'; Twine 20'; McLoughlin (yellow card) 88'	Report	Hugill (yellow card) 41'; Hall 59'; Revan (yellow card) 62'	Stadium: MKM Stadium; Attendance: 19,766; Referee: Rebecca Welch

2 December 2023 19	Hull City	1–2	Watford	Kingston upon Hull
15:00 GMT	Twine 10'; Connolly (yellow card) 90+6'	Report	Kayembe 8'; Andrews (yellow card) 38'; Hoedt 74'; Hamer (yellow card) 85'	Stadium: MKM Stadium; Attendance: 20,057; Referee: John Busby

9 December 2023 20	Queens Park Rangers	2–0	Hull City	White City, London
15:00 GMT	Willock 45+1'; Dykes (yellow card) 70'; Chair 73'	Report	Philogene (yellow card) 51'; Seri (yellow card) 70'; Delap (yellow card) 87'	Stadium: Loftus Road; Attendance: 16,967; Referee: James Bell

13 December 2023 21	Middlesbrough	1–2	Hull City	Middlesbrough
20:00 GMT	Latte Lath 6'	Report	Coyle (yellow card) 65'; Delap 69'; Tufan 82'	Stadium: Riverside Stadium; Attendance: 24,158; Referee: Oliver Langford

16 December 2023 22	Hull City	3–0	Cardiff City	Kingston upon Hull
15:00 GMT	Connolly 32'; Twine 56', Tufan 59'; Christie (yellow card) 67'	Report	Collins (yellow card) 54'; Siopis (yellow card) 56'; Adams (yellow card) 83'	Stadium: MKM Stadium; Attendance: 20,352; Referee: Keith Stroud

22 December 2023 23	Bristol City	3–2	Hull City	Bristol
19:45 GMT	Conway 25' (pen.); Tanner (yellow card) 39'; Vyner (yellow card) 42'; Mehmeti 76'; Knight 84'	Report	Seri (yellow card) 7'; Connolly 30'; Tufan 42' (pen.); Allsop (yellow card) 53'; Greaves (yellow card) 72'	Stadium: Ashton Gate; Attendance: 20,816; Referee: Ben Toner

26 December 2023 24	Hull City	0–1	Sunderland	Kingston upon Hull
15:00 GMT	Delap (yellow card) 88'	Report	Clarke 82'; Triantis (yellow card) 90+4'	Stadium: MKM Stadium; Attendance: 24,420; Referee: Sunny Gill
Note: The match was for the 2023–24 Raich Carter Trophy.

29 December 2023 25	Hull City	3–2	Blackburn Rovers	Kingston upon Hull
19:45 GMT	Tufan (yellow card) 5'; Delap 11'; Connolly 18'; Jones 63'; Seri (yellow card) 72'; Morton (yellow card) 81'	Report	Garrett (yellow card) 29'; Szmodics 33'; Hill (yellow card) 37'; Pickering 48'; Tronstad (yellow card) 52'; Hyam (yellow card) 59' (yellow-red card) 74'	Stadium: MKM Stadium; Attendance: 21,876; Referee: Matt Donohue

1 January 2024 26	Sheffield Wednesday	3–1	Hull City	Owlerton
17:15 GMT	Johnson 49'; Gassama 55'; Palmer (yellow card) 60'; Valentín (yellow card) 62'; Windass 73'; Wilks (yellow card) 90+3'	Report	Morton (red card) 35' (Note: The red card against Sheffield Wednesday on 1 January 2024 was rescinded on appeal.); Jones (yellow card) 45+1'; Twine (yellow card) 57', (goal) 76' (pen.); Greaves (yellow card) 85'; Slater (yellow card) 89'	Stadium: Hillsborough Stadium; Attendance: 27,489; Referee: Darren Bond
Note: Live on Sky Sports

12 January 2024 27	Hull City	1–2	Norwich City	Kingston upon Hull
20:00 GMT	Tufan (yellow card) 51'; Slater (yellow card) 52'; Morton 90+1'	Report	McLean (yellow card) 23'; Giannoulis (yellow card) 34'; Rowe 36', (yellow card) 39'; Núñez (yellow card) 38'; Fassnacht 88'	Stadium: MKM Stadium; Attendance: 24,103; Referee: Andrew Kitchen
Note: Fixture was originally scheduled for 13 January, but was moved for TV coverage.

19 January 2024 28	Sunderland	0–1	Hull City	Sunderland
20:00 GMT	Ekwah (yellow card) 48'; Clarke (yellow card) 90+4'	Report	Tufan (yellow card) 17'; Docherty (yellow card) 30'; Coyle (yellow card) 32'; Morton (yellow card) 40'; Slater (yellow card) 43'; Carvalho 71'; Allsop (yellow card) 83'; Jacob (yellow card) 89'	Stadium: Stadium of Light; Attendance: 40,219; Referee: Robert Jones
Note: Fixture was originally scheduled for 20 January, but was moved for TV coverage.

3 February 2024 29	Hull City	1–0	Millwall	Kingston upon Hull
15:00 GMT	Philogene 5', (yellow card) 44'; Morton (yellow card) 51'; Carvalho (yellow card) 90+2'	Report	Wallace (yellow card) 48'; De Norre (yellow card) 82'	Stadium: MKM Stadium; Attendance: 21,486; Referee: Anthony Backhouse

10 February 2024 30	Hull City	0–1	Swansea City	Kingston upon Hull
15:00 GMT	Morton (yellow card) 27'	Report	Cullen 11'; Cabango (yellow card) 38'; Grimes (yellow card) 83'; Humphreys (yellow card) 87'	Stadium: MKM Stadium; Attendance: 21,017; Referee: Geoff Eltringham

13 February 2024 31	Rotherham United	1–2	Hull City	Rotherham
19:45 GMT	Tiéhi 4', (yellow card) 68'; Revan (yellow card) 89'	Report	Philogene (yellow card) 30', (goal) 71' (Note: The goal against Rotherham United on 13 February 2024 was initially given as an own goal to Cameron Humphreys but later assigned to Jaden Philogene.); Ohio 75'	Stadium: New York Stadium; Attendance: 10,668; Referee: Leigh Doughty

17 February 2024 32	Huddersfield Town	1–2	Hull City	Huddersfield
15:00 GMT	Rudoni (yellow card) 14', (goal) 90+2'; Spencer (yellow card) 30'; Thomas (yellow card) 45+2'	Report	Greaves 7', 90+4'; Philogene (yellow card) 24'	Stadium: Kirklees Stadium; Attendance: 19,947; Referee: Rebecca Welch

20 February 2024 33	Southampton	1–2	Hull City	Southampton
19:45 GMT	Walker-Peters (yellow card) 23'; Aribo 88'	Report	Zaroury 11'; Carvalho 36'; Jones (yellow card) 78'; Jacob (yellow card) 90+1'	Stadium: St Mary's Stadium; Attendance: 26,834; Referee: Oliver Langford
Note: Fixture was previously scheduled for a 15:00 kick-off on 27 January, but was moved due to Southampton's progress in the FA Cup.

24 February 2024 34	Hull City	1–1	West Bromwich Albion	Kingston upon Hull
12:30 GMT	Carvalho 35'	Report	Furlong 43'	Stadium: MKM Stadium; Attendance: 22,654; Referee: Stephen Martin
Note: Fixture was previously scheduled for a 15:00 kick-off, but was pushed forward for live Sky Sports coverage.

2 March 2024 35	Preston North End	0–0	Hull City	Deepdale, Preston
15:00 GMT	McCann (yellow card) 83'	Report	Giles (yellow card) 40'	Stadium: Deepdale; Attendance: 16,997; Referee: Thomas Bramall

5 March 2024 36	Hull City	1–1	Birmingham City	Kingston upon Hull
19:45 GMT	Tufan 25'; Jones (yellow card) 90+3'	Report	James (yellow card) 26'; Šunjić (yellow card) 33'; Jutkiewicz 82'; Stansfield (yellow card) 90+3'	Stadium: MKM Stadium; Attendance: 20,398; Referee: Keith Stroud

9 March 2024 37	Hull City	2–2	Leicester City	Kingston upon Hull
15:00 GMT	Carvalho 16'; Greaves (yellow card) 38'; Zaroury 60'; Seri (yellow card) 70'	Report	Vardy (yellow card) 25', 31' (pen.), 62'; Faes (yellow card) 45+2'	Stadium: MKM Stadium; Attendance: 24,605; Referee: Samuel Barrott

29 March 2024 38	Hull City	0–2	Stoke City	Kingston upon Hull
15:00 GMT		Report	McNally (yellow card) 28'; Rose (yellow card) 28'; Laurent (yellow card) 33'; Laurent 69'; Stevens (yellow card) 74'; Hoever 90+3'	Stadium: MKM Stadium; Attendance: 24,601; Referee: Graham Scott

1 April 2024 39	Leeds United	3–1	Hull City	Leeds
20:00 BST	Byram 9'; Firpo (yellow card) 27'; Summerville 88' (pen.), (yellow card) 89'; James 90+7'	Report	Carvalho 34'; Tufan (yellow card) 54'; Seri (yellow card) 70'	Stadium: Elland Road; Attendance: 36,747; Referee: Josh Smith
Note: Fixture was initially scheduled for a 15:00 kick-off, but was moved for live Sky Sports broadcasting.

6 April 2024 40	Cardiff City	1–3	Hull City	Leckwith
15:00 BST	Grant 57'; Siopis (yellow card) 72'	Report	Carvalho 32', 44'; Philogene 59'; Greaves (yellow card) 62'; Jones (yellow card) 70'; Christie (yellow card) 90+1'	Stadium: Cardiff City Stadium; Attendance: 20,688; Referee: John Busby

10 April 2024 41	Hull City	2–2	Middlesbrough	Kingston upon Hull
19:45 BST	Philogene 29', (yellow card) 90+1'; Seri 41'; Giles (yellow card) 84'; Carvalho (yellow card) 86'	Report	Lath 4'; Azaz 71'	Stadium: MKM Stadium; Attendance: 21,934; Referee: Gavin Ward

13 April 2024 42	Hull City	3–0	Queens Park Rangers	Kingston upon Hull
15:00 BST	Tufan 8'; Carvalho 27'; Philogene 52'; Slater (yellow card) 75'; Morton (yellow card) 78'	Report	Dunne (yellow card) 36'	Stadium: MKM Stadium; Attendance: 21,225; Referee: Tom Nield

20 April 2024 43	Watford	0–0	Hull City	Watford
15:00 BST	Hoedt (yellow card) 40'; Porteous (yellow card) 50'; Andrews (yellow card) 52'; Sierralta (yellow card) 72'	Report	Greaves (yellow card) 42'; Jacob (yellow card) 62'; Morton (yellow card) 70'; Traoré (yellow card) 90+2'	Stadium: Vicarage Road; Attendance: 18,753; Referee: Ben Toner

24 April 2024 44	Coventry City	2–3	Hull City	Coventry
19:45 BST	Palmer 37'; Eccles (yellow card) 45+2'; Sheaf (yellow card) 45+2'; Thomas 58'	Report	Philogene 31', (yellow card) 45+3'; Morton (yellow card) 42'; Carvalho 45+1' (pen.), (yellow card) 45+3'; Jones (yellow card) 68'; Ohio 78'	Stadium: Coventry Building Society Arena; Attendance: 25,023; Referee: Leigh Doughty
Note: Fixture was originally scheduled for 16 March, but was postponed due to Coventry's FA Cup progression.

27 April 2024 45	Hull City	3–3	Ipswich Town	Kingston upon Hull
20:00 BST	Tufan 40'; Carvalho (yellow card) 45+4'; Delap 56'; Ohio 87'	Report	Hirst 19'; Tuanzebe (yellow card) 36'; Burns (yellow card) 45'; Hutchinson 45+2', 67'; Luongo (yellow card) 54'	Stadium: MKM Stadium; Attendance: 24,298; Referee: Andrew Kitchen
Note: Fixture was initially scheduled for a 15:00 kick-off, but was moved for live Sky Sports broadcast.

4 May 2024 46	Plymouth Argyle	1–0	Hull City	Plymouth
12:30 GMT	Edwards 40'			Stadium: Home Park; Attendance: 16,881; Referee: Darren Bond

=== FA Cup ===
The draw for the third round of the FA Cup took place on 3 December 2023, with matches taking place between 5 and 8 January 2024. Hull were drawn at home to Birmingham City, with the match been played on 6 January 2024. Both teams made seven changes for the match. Lukas Jutkiewicz made early shots, one saved by Ryan Allsop while another just missed the target, before he headed the opener for Birmingham, 18-minutes into the match. Siriki Dembele nearly doubled the lead moments later when his shot hit the bar. Hull failed to reply, with Aaron Connolly having several attempts saved by Neil Etheridge. This was until Etheridge failed to collect one of Connolly's shots late in the game, which fell to debutant Matty Jacob who then scored from close-range. This earned Hull a 1–1 draw and a replay at St Andrew's.

The draw for the Fourth round took place on 8 January 2024 and the winner of the replay were drawn away to Leicester City.

Win Draw Loss Fixtures

6 January 2024 Third round	Hull City	1–1	Birmingham City	Kingston upon Hull
15:00 GMT	Jacob 87'; Tufan (yellow card) 90+1'	Report	Jutkiewicz 18', (yellow card) 39'; Sanderson (yellow card) 43'; Dembélé (yellow card) 57'; Etheridge (yellow card) 75'; Bielik (yellow card) 86'; James (yellow card) 90+4'	Stadium: MKM Stadium; Attendance: 12,200; Referee: Darren England

16 January 2024 Third round replay	Birmingham City	2–1	Hull City	Bordesley, Birmingham
19:45 GMT	Stansfield 66'; Miyoshi 90+3'	Report	Lokilo 12'	Stadium: St Andrew's; Attendance: 7,133; Referee: Lewis Smith

=== EFL Cup ===
The draw for the first round of the cup took place on 22 June 2023, with matches taking place during the week starting 7 August 2023. Hull were drawn at home against Doncaster Rovers in the first round. The match was scheduled for 8 August 2023 with a 7:45 pm kick-off.

Win Draw Loss Fixtures

8 August 2023 First round	Hull City	1–2	Doncaster Rovers	Kingston upon Hull
19:45 BST	Estupiñán 3'; Traoré (yellow card) 43'; McLoughlin (yellow card) 67'	Report	Sotona (yellow card) 9'; Broadbent (yellow card) 14'; Miller 15', 61'; Bailey (yellow card) 29'; Lawlor (yellow card) 77'; Anderson (yellow card) 88'	Stadium: MKM Stadium; Attendance: 6,577; Referee: Simon Mather

== Statistics ==
As of 14 May 2024.

=== Appearances ===
Note: Appearances shown after a "+" indicate player came on during course of the match.

No.	Pos	Nat	Player	Total		Championship		FA Cup		League Cup	
No.	Pos	Nat	Player	Apps	Goals	Apps	Goals	Apps	Goals	Apps	Goals
1	GK	(England) ENG	Matt Ingram	12	0	9+1	0	1	0	1	0
2	DF	(England) ENG	Lewie Coyle	42	1	35+5	1	0+1	0	0+1	0
3	DF	(Portugal) POR	Rúben Vinagre	11	0	6+4	0	0	0	1	0
3	DF	(England) ENG	Ryan Giles	17	0	11+6	0	0	0	0	0
4	DF	(England) ENG	Jacob Greaves	43	2	43	2	0	0	0	0
5	DF	(England) ENG	Alfie Jones	45	1	45	1	0	0	0	0
6	DF	(Republic of Ireland) IRL	Sean McLoughlin	26	0	13+10	0	2	0	1	0
7	MF	(Turkey) TUR	Ozan Tufan	40	10	25+12	10	0+2	0	0+1	0
8	MF	(Scotland) SCO	Greg Docherty	17	0	1+14	0	2	0	0	0
9	FW	(Iran) IRI	Allahyar Sayyadmanesh	8	0	0+6	0	2	0	0	0
9	FW	(Netherlands) NED	Noah Ohio	8	3	1+7	3	0	0	0	0
10	MF	(Mali) MLI	Adama Traoré	25	2	14+10	2	0	0	1	0
11	FW	(Turkey) TUR	Doğukan Sinik	1	0	0+1	0	0	0	0	0
12	FW	(England) ENG	Billy Sharp	13	0	2+9	0	1+1	0	0	0
14	MF	(Republic of Ireland) IRL	Harry Vaughan	10	0	1+7	0	2	0	0	0
15	MF	(England) ENG	Ryan Woods	0	0	0	0	0	0	0	0
15	MF	(England) ENG	Tyler Morton	41	3	35+4	3	0+2	0	0	0
16	FW	(England) ENG	Ryan Longman	0	0	0	0	0	0	0	0
17	GK	(England) ENG	Ryan Allsop	38	0	37	0	1	0	0	0
18	MF	(England) ENG	Xavier Simons	3	0	0+2	0	0	0	1	0
19	FW	(Colombia) COL	Óscar Estupiñán	5	1	0+4	0	0	0	1	1
20	FW	(England) ENG	Liam Delap	32	8	26+5	8	0	0	0+1	0
21	DF	(England) ENG	Brandon Fleming	1	0	0	0	0	0	1	0
22	FW	(Democratic Republic of the Congo) COD	Jason Lokilo	22	1	8+11	0	2	1	1	0
23	FW	(England) ENG	Jaden Philogene	32	12	32	12	0	0	0	0
24	MF	(Ivory Coast) CIV	Jean Michaël Seri	39	1	39	1	0	0	0	0
25	DF	(Republic of Ireland) IRL	James Furlong	1	0	0	0	1	0	0	0
26	DF	(England) ENG	Andy Smith	4	0	0+1	0	2	0	1	0
27	MF	(England) ENG	Regan Slater	41	2	31+7	2	2	0	0+1	0
28	MF	(Wales) WAL	Callum Jones	0	0	0	0	0	0	0	0
29	DF	(England) ENG	Matty Jacob	15	1	8+6	0	1	1	0	0
30	MF	(England) ENG	Scott Twine	27	4	20+5	4	1	0	1	0
31	MF	(United States) USA	Vaughn Covil	1	0	0	0	0	0	0+1	0
32	GK	(France) FRA	Thimothée Lo-Tutala	0	0	0	0	0	0	0	0
33	DF	(Republic of Ireland) IRL	Cyrus Christie	28	0	12+15	0	0	0	1	0
34	GK	(Wales) WAL	David Robson	0	0	0	0	0	0	0	0
36	FW	(England) ENG	Will Jarvis	0	0	0	0	0	0	0	0
41	FW	(England) ENG	Tyrell Sellars-Fleming	4	0	0+2	0	1+1	0	0	0
43	DF	(Republic of Ireland) IRL	Stan Ashbee	1	0	0	0	1	0	0	0
44	FW	(Republic of Ireland) IRL	Aaron Connolly	30	8	13+15	8	1	0	1	0
45	MF	(Portugal) POR	Fábio Carvalho	20	9	20	9	0	0	0	0
47	FW	(Morocco) MAR	Anass Zaroury	12	2	9+3	2	0	0	0	0
50	MF	(Turkey) TUR	Abdülkadir Ömür	16	0	11+5	0	0	0	0	0

- Source: Compiled from competitive match reports

=== Top goalscorers ===
Player	Number	Position	Championship	FA Cup	League Cup	Total
(England) Jaden Philogene	23	FW	12	0	0	12
(Turkey) Ozan Tufan	7	MF	10	0	0	10
(Portugal) Fábio Carvalho	45	MF	9	0	0	9
(Republic of Ireland) Aaron Connolly	44	FW	8	0	0	8
(England) Liam Delap	20	MF	8	0	0	8
(England) Scott Twine	30	MF	4	0	0	4
(England) Tyler Morton	15	MF	3	0	0	3
(Netherlands) Noah Ohio	9	FW	3	0	0	3
(England) Jacob Greaves	4	DF	2	0	0	2
(England) Regan Slater	27	MF	2	0	0	2
(Mali) Adama Traoré	10	MF	2	0	0	2
(Morocco) Anass Zaroury	47	FW	2	0	0	2
(England) Lewie Coyle	2	DF	1	0	0	1
(Colombia) Óscar Estupiñán	19	FW	0	0	1	1
(England) Matty Jacob	29	DF	0	1	0	1
(England) Alfie Jones	5	DF	1	0	0	1
(Democratic Republic of the Congo) Jason Lokilo	22	FW	0	1	0	1
(Ivory Coast) Jean Michaël Seri	24	MF	1	0	0	1
Total			69	2	1	72

=== Disciplinary record ===
Player	Number	Position	Championship		FA Cup		League Cup		Total	
Player	Number	Position	Yellow card	Red card	Yellow card	Red card	Yellow card	Red card	Yellow card	Red card
(England) Tyler Morton	15	MF	8	1	0	0	0	0	8	1
(England) Jacob Greaves	4	DF	11	0	0	0	0	0	11	0
(England) Jaden Philogene	23	FW	8	0	0	0	0	0	8	0
(Ivory Coast) Jean Michaël Seri	24	MF	8	0	0	0	0	0	8	0
(England) Alfie Jones	5	DF	7	0	0	0	0	0	7	0
(England) Liam Delap	20	FW	6	0	0	0	0	0	6	0
(Turkey) Ozan Tufan	7	MF	5	0	1	0	0	0	6	0
(Mali) Adama Traoré	10	MF	4	0	0	0	1	0	5	0
(Portugal) Fábio Carvalho	45	MF	4	0	0	0	0	0	4	0
(Republic of Ireland) Cyrus Christie	33	DF	4	0	0	0	0	0	4	0
(Republic of Ireland) Aaron Connolly	44	FW	4	0	0	0	0	0	4	0
(England) Regan Slater	27	MF	4	0	0	0	0	0	4	0
(England) Ryan Allsop	17	GK	3	0	0	0	0	0	3	0
(England) Lewie Coyle	2	DF	3	0	0	0	0	0	3	0
(England) Matty Jacob	29	DF	3	0	0	0	0	0	3	0
(England) Scott Twine	30	MF	3	0	0	0	0	0	3	0
(Scotland) Greg Docherty	8	MF	2	0	0	0	0	0	2	0
(England) Ryan Giles	3	DF	2	0	0	0	0	0	2	0
(Democratic Republic of the Congo) Jason Lokilo	22	FW	2	0	0	0	0	0	2	0
(Republic of Ireland) Sean McLoughlin	6	DF	1	0	0	0	1	0	2	0
(Iran) Allahyar Sayyadmanesh	9	FW	2	0	0	0	0	0	2	0
(Portugal) Rúben Vinagre	3	DF	2	0	0	0	0	0	2	0
(England) Matt Ingram	1	GK	1	0	0	0	0	0	1	0
Total			97	1	1	0	2	0	99	1

== Kits ==
On 23 June 2023, the club announced that the kits for the 2023–24 season would be manufactured by Kappa.

On 3 July 2023 Hull City revealed the home kit for the 2023–24 season. The shirt would be a traditional black and amber striped pattern. The shorts would be black with amber trim and the socks would be black with amber turnover.

On 14 July 2023 Hull City revealed the third kit for the 2023–24 season. The shirt would be blue with amber on the sleeves and collar. The shorts would also be blue with amber trim and the socks would be blue with amber turnover.

On 29 July 2023 Hull City revealed the away kit for the 2023–24 season when it was used for the final pre-season match against Nantes. The shirt would be amber with "subtle vertical stripes of 'Up the Tigers' lettering on the front". The shorts would also be amber with black trim. The socks would be amber with black turnover.

== Awards ==
The annual awards for the club saw Jacob Greaves pick-up the Players' Player of the Year, Supporters' Player of the Year awards and Player of the Year, selected by head coach Liam Rosenior, awards. Ozan Tufan was presented with the Goal of the Season award for his goal against Queens Park Rangers on 13 April 2024 in the 3–0 home win in the league. Jaden Philogene took the award for Young Player of the Year. The Frank Donoghue Academy Player of the Year award went to Stan Ashbee for a consecutive season.
