= Rayhaan Tulloch =

English footballer (born 2001)

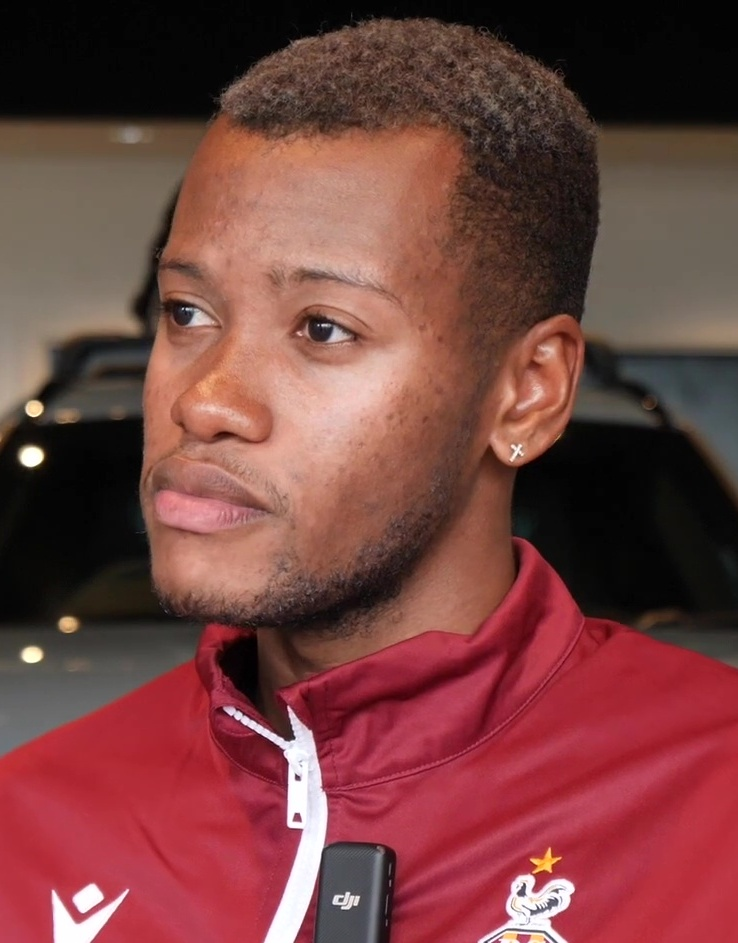

Personal information
- Full name: Rayhaan Rahim Amari Tulloch
- Date of birth: 20 January 2001 (age 25)
- Place of birth: Birmingham, England
- Height: 5 ft 10 in (1.78 m)
- Position: Winger

Team information
- Current team: Portadown
- Number: 77

Youth career
- –2018: West Bromwich Albion

Senior career*
| Years | Team | Apps | (Gls) |
| 2018–2024 | West Bromwich Albion | 2 | (0) |
| 2020–2021 | → Doncaster Rovers (loan) | 2 | (0) |
| 2022–2023 | → Rochdale (loan) | 7 | (0) |
| 2023 | → Dundalk (loan) | 19 | (5) |
| 2023–2024 | → Bradford City (loan) | 8 | (1) |
| 2024 | Shrewsbury Town | 1 | (0) |
| 2024–2025 | Shelbourne | 13 | (2) |
| 2025– | Portadown | 11 | (0) |

International career^{‡}
| 2016–2017 | England U16 | 3 | (2) |
| 2017–2018 | England U17 | 12 | (2) |
| 2019 | England U18 | 3 | (0) |
- * Club domestic league appearances and goals as of 23 February 2026 ‡ National team caps and goals as of 23:34, 26 May 2019 (UTC)

Rayhaan Rahim Amari Tulloch (born 20 January 2001) is an English professional footballer who plays as a winger for NIFL Premiership club Portadown. Tulloch has previously represented England at youth international level.

== Club career ==
Born in Birmingham, Tulloch joined West Bromwich Albion's academy aged nine. Tulloch made his professional debut for West Brom on 26 January 2019, coming on in the 81st minute for Wes Hoolahan in a 0–0 draw with Brighton & Hove Albion in the fourth round of the FA Cup. Tulloch made his second West Brom appearance in the FA Cup fourth round replay at home to Brighton on 6 February 2019, coming on for Jake Livermore in the 63rd minute of a 1–3 defeat.

On 11 September 2020, Tulloch joined League One club Doncaster Rovers on a season-long loan deal, reuniting with former manager Darren Moore. On his second appearance for Doncaster, he suffered a serious hamstring injury which would see the loan terminated early.

On 8 August 2022, Tulloch joined Rochdale on a season-long loan.

On 22 January 2023, Tulloch joined League of Ireland Premier Division side Dundalk on loan. He scored 5 goals in 19 games before returning to West Brom at the end of June.

Tulloch joined Bradford City on a season-long loan deal on 1 September 2023.

On 1 February 2024, Tulloch was recalled from his loan at Bradford City before having his contract terminated by mutual consent.

On 9 March 2024, Tulloch signed for Shrewsbury Town on a short-term contract until the end of the 2023–24 season.

On 10 July 2024, Tulloch signed for League of Ireland Premier Division club Shelbourne, after making just 1 appearance for Shrewsbury Town.

On 18 July 2025, Tulloch signed for NIFL Premiership club Portadown.

== International career ==
In May 2018, Tulloch was a member of the England under-17 squad as they hosted the 2018 UEFA European Under-17 Championship. He started in the semi-final defeat against the Netherlands. In May 2019, Tulloch was included in the England U18s squad for the Slovakia Cup.

== Career statistics ==
As of match played 18 April 2025

Appearances and goals by club, season and competition
| Club | Season | League | | | National Cup | | League Cup | | Other | | Total | |
| Club | Season | Division | Apps | Goals | Apps | Goals | Apps | Goals | Apps | Goals | Apps | Goals |
|---|---|---|---|---|---|---|---|---|---|---|---|---|
| West Bromwich Albion U21 | 2016–17 | — | | | — | | — | | 1 (Note: Appearance(s) in the EFL Trophy) | 0 | 1 | 0 |
| West Bromwich Albion U21 | 2017–18 | — | | | — | | — | | 1 | 1 | 1 | 1 |
| West Bromwich Albion U21 | 2018–19 | — | | | — | | — | | 3 | 1 | 3 | 1 |
| West Bromwich Albion U21 | Total | | 0 | 0 | 0 | 0 | 0 | 0 | 5 | 2 | 5 | 2 |
| West Bromwich Albion | 2018–19 | Championship | 0 | 0 | 2 | 0 | 0 | 0 | 0 | 0 | 2 | 0 |
| West Bromwich Albion | 2019–20 | Championship | 0 | 0 | 3 | 0 | 0 | 0 | 0 | 0 | 3 | 0 |
| West Bromwich Albion | 2020–21 | Premier League | 0 | 0 | 0 | 0 | 0 | 0 | 0 | 0 | 0 | 0 |
| West Bromwich Albion | 2021–22 | Championship | 2 | 0 | 0 | 0 | 0 | 0 | 0 | 0 | 2 | 0 |
| West Bromwich Albion | 2022–23 | Championship | 0 | 0 | 0 | 0 | — | | 0 | 0 | 0 | 0 |
| West Bromwich Albion | 2023–24 | Championship | 0 | 0 | — | | 0 | 0 | 0 | 0 | 0 | 0 |
| West Bromwich Albion | Total | | 2 | 0 | 5 | 0 | 0 | 0 | 0 | 0 | 7 | 0 |
| Doncaster Rovers (loan) | 2020–21 | League One | 2 | 0 | — | | — | | — | | 2 | 0 |
| Rochdale (loan) | 2022–23 | League Two | 9 | 0 | 0 | 0 | 2 | 0 | 3 | 0 | 14 | 0 |
| Dundalk (loan) | 2023 | LOI Premier Division | 19 | 5 | — | | — | | 0 | 0 | 19 | 5 |
| Bradford City (loan) | 2023–24 | League Two | 8 | 1 | 0 | 0 | 1 | 0 | 1 | 0 | 10 | 1 |
| Shrewsbury Town | 2023–24 | League One | 1 | 0 | — | | — | | — | | 1 | 0 |
| Shelbourne | 2024 | LOI Premier Division | 10 | 2 | 3 | 0 | — | | 2 (Note: Appearance(s) in the UEFA Conference League) | 0 | 13 | 2 |
| Shelbourne | 2025 | LOI Premier Division | 3 | 0 | — | | — | | 1 (Note: Appearance in the President of Ireland's Cup) | 0 | 4 | 0 |
| Shelbourne | Total | | 13 | 2 | 3 | 0 | — | | 3 | 0 | 19 | 2 |
| Portadown | 2025–26 | NIFL Premiership | 0 | 0 | 0 | 0 | 0 | 0 | — | | 0 | 0 |
| Career total | | | 53 | 8 | 8 | 0 | 3 | 0 | 10 | 2 | 74 | 10 |

== Honours ==
Shelbourne

- League of Ireland Premier Division: 2024
- President of Ireland's Cup: 2025
