= Tyler Morton =

English footballer (born 2002)

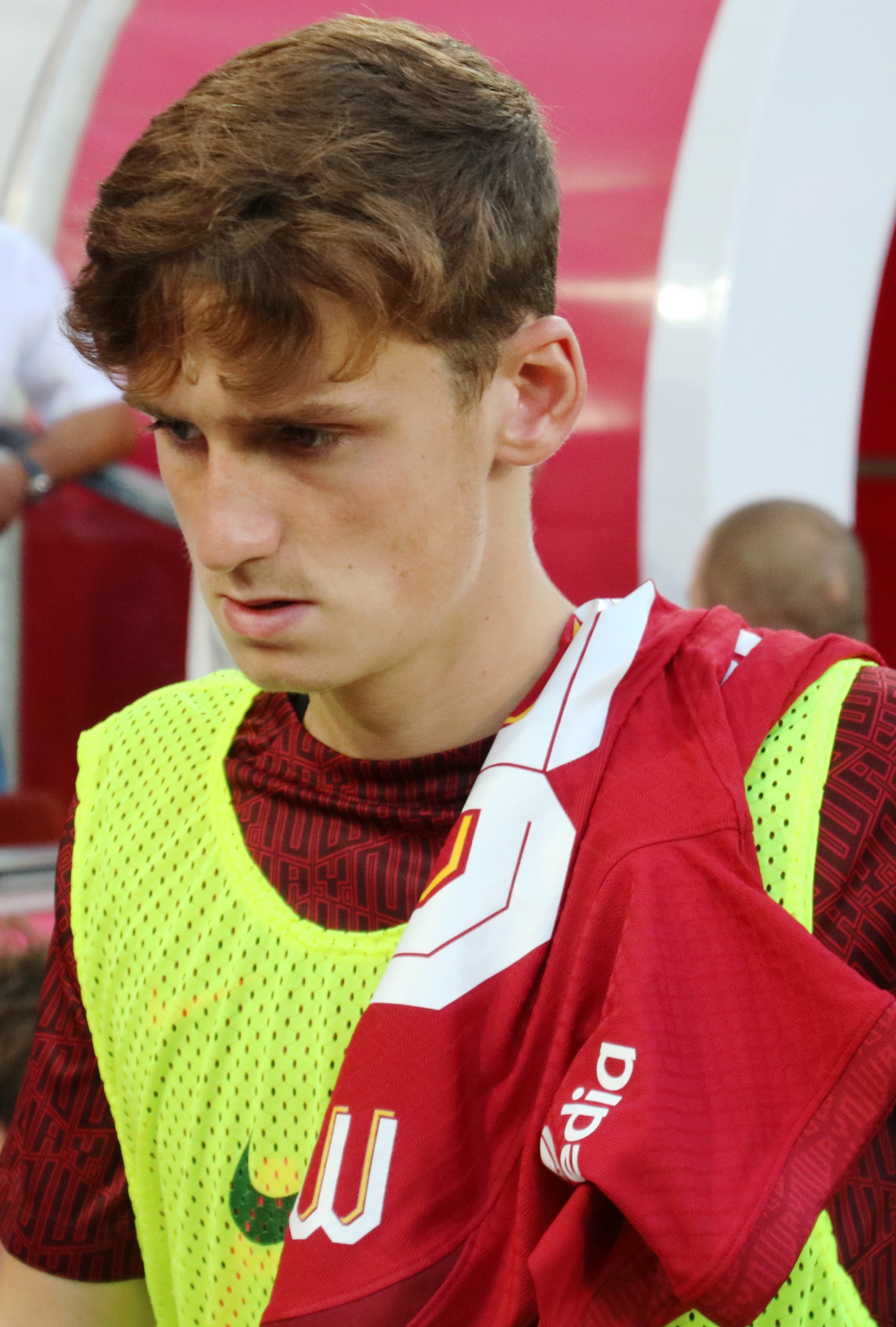
- Morton with Liverpool in 2022

Personal information
- Full name: Tyler Scott Morton
- Date of birth: 31 October 2002 (age 24)
- Place of birth: Wallasey, Merseyside, England
- Height: 6 ft 1 in (1.85 m)
- Position: Defensive midfielder

Team information
- Current team: Lyon
- Number: 23

Youth career
- 2009–2020: Liverpool

Senior career*
Years	Team	Apps	(Gls)
2021–2025	Liverpool	2	(0)
2022–2023	→ Blackburn Rovers (loan)	40	(0)
2023–2024	→ Hull City (loan)	39	(3)
2025–	Lyon	36	(2)

International career^{‡}
2021–2022	England U20	3	(0)
2023–2025	England U21	13	(1)
Medal record
Men's football
Representing England
UEFA European Under-21 Championship
Winner	2025 Slovakia
- * Club domestic league appearances and goals as of 22:30, 26 October 2026 (UTC) ‡ National team caps and goals as of 23:24, 28 June 2025 (UTC)

Tyler Scott Morton (born 31 October 2002) is an English professional footballer who plays as a defensive midfielder for Ligue 1 club Lyon.

== Club career ==
=== Liverpool ===
Morton was playing for the Greenleas junior team when spotted by Liverpool academy coaches and joined the club aged seven, having also turned down an offer to join the Everton youth set-up.

Morton made his debut for the team's under-18 side in the 2019–20 season scoring his first goal in a 6–1 Merseyside derby victory over Everton. He started the 2020–21 season with the Under-18's before moving up to the Under-23 squad. He scored 10 times for Liverpool's Under-18 and Under-23 sides during the 2020–21 campaign and played a key role as the youth team reached the FA Youth Cup final. In January 2021, Morton signed a new long-term contract with the club.

Morton made his first team debut in a pre-season friendly in July 2021 against Wacker Innsbruck, followed by his competitive debut for the Liverpool first team as a second-half substitute on 21 September 2021 in an EFL Cup match against Norwich City. On 20 November, he made his Premier League debut, coming on in the final minutes of a 4–0 home victory over Arsenal. Four days later, he made his UEFA Champions League debut in a home match against Porto, playing the full 90 minutes of the 2–0 win. On 19 December, Morton was given his first Premier League start, in which he played 60 minutes and was shown a yellow card in a 2–2 draw away to Tottenham Hotspur.

==== Loan to Blackburn Rovers ====
On 1 August 2022, Morton joined Blackburn Rovers on a season-long loan. He made his Rovers debut as a late substitute in a 3–0 win over Swansea City on 6 August, making his first start later that week, and going on to appear 46 times throughout the season.

==== Loan to Hull City ====
On 1 September 2023, Hull City signed Morton on loan for the 2023–24 season. He made his debut for Hull City as a 59th-minute substitute for Jean Michaël Seri on 15 September 2023 in the 1–1 draw against Coventry City. On 25 November 2023, he scored the final goal to earn a 2–2 draw away against Swansea City.

In December 2023, Morton was named EFL Young Player of the Month. On 1 January 2024, Morton was controversially sent off in the 35th minute for a sliding tackle against Sheffield Wednesday. The red card was rescinded on appeal.

=== Lyon ===
On 5 August 2025, Morton joined Ligue 1 club Lyon on a five-year contract in a deal worth up to €15 million, with Liverpool retaining a 20% sell-on clause.

== International career ==
On 11 November 2021, Morton made his England U20 debut during a 2–0 defeat to Portugal in the 2021–22 Under 20 Elite League. In March 2022 he started in a defeat away to Poland and also played in a victory against Germany at Colchester.

In September 2022 Morton received his first call-up to the England under-21 squad. On 18 November 2023 he made his debut as a substitute in the 3-0 2025 UEFA European Under-21 Championship qualification victory away to Serbia. Three days later in their next qualifier he scored his only goal at international youth level during a win against Northern Ireland.

Morton was included in the England squad for the 2025 UEFA European Under-21 Championship. He started in their quarter-final victory over Spain however a yellow card during that game meant he was suspended for the semi-final against Netherlands. Morton returned for the final and provided an assist with a cross for the winning goal by Jonathan Rowe in extra time as England defeated Germany to win the tournament.

== Career statistics ==
=== Club ===
As of match played 26 October 2026

Appearances and goals by club, season and competition
Club	Season	League			National cup (Note: Includes FA Cup, Coupe de France)		League cup (Note: Includes EFL Cup)		Europe		Total	
Club	Season	Division	Apps	Goals	Apps	Goals	Apps	Goals	Apps	Goals	Apps	Goals
Liverpool	2021–22	Premier League	2	0	2	0	3	0	2 (Note: Appearance(s) in UEFA Champions League)	0	9	0
Liverpool	2024–25	Premier League	0	0	1	0	3	0	1	0	5	0
Liverpool	Total		2	0	3	0	6	0	3	0	14	0
Blackburn Rovers (loan)	2022–23	Championship	40	0	4	0	2	0	—		46	0
Hull City (loan)	2023–24	Championship	39	3	2	0	—		—		41	3
Lyon	2025–26	Ligue 1	29	2	4	0	—		10 (Note: Appearance(s) in UEFA Europa League)	0	43	2
Lyon	2026–27	Ligue 1	7	0	0	0	—		7 (Note: Four appearances and one goal in UEFA Champions League, three appearances in UEFA Europa League)	1	14	1
Lyon	Total		36	2	4	0	—		17	1	57	3
Career total			117	5	13	0	8	0	20	1	158	6

== Honours ==
Liverpool Academy

- Lancashire Senior Cup: 2021–22

England U21

- UEFA European Under-21 Championship: 2025
