= Bora Aydınlık =

Turkish footballer

Personal information
- Date of birth: 9 May 2005 (age 21)
- Place of birth: Miami Beach, Florida, United States
- Height: 1.81 m (5 ft 11 in)
- Position: Forward

Team information
- Current team: Fethiyespor
- Number: 20

Youth career
- 2015–2023: Fenerbahçe

Senior career*
Years	Team	Apps	(Gls)
2023–2025	Fenerbahçe	0	(0)
2023–2024	→ Hull City (loan)	0	(0)
2024–2025	→ Beyoğlu Yeni Çarşı (loan)	30	(2)
2025–2026	Manisa	0	(0)
2025–2026	→ Arnavutköy Belediyespor (loan)	25	(4)
2026–	Fethiyespor	6	(0)

International career^{‡}
2022	Turkey U19	2	(0)
- * Club domestic league appearances and goals as of 1 November 2026 ‡ National team caps and goals as of 15:44, 23 December 2022 (UTC)

Bora Aydınlık (born 9 May 2005) is a footballer who plays as a forward for TFF 2. Lig club Fethiyespor. Born in the United States, he represented Turkey at youth level.

== Club career ==
Born in Miami Beach, Florida, Aydınlık moved to Turkey at a young age, joining Fenerbahçe in 2015. Starting out as a left-back, he moved further up the pitch and mostly operates as a left-winger or striker. During his time with Fenerbahçe, he was seen as a future star player for the club, and was compared to former teammate Arda Güler in this regard. His first taste of senior action came when he was named on the bench for a UEFA Europa Conference League game against Slavia Prague in February 2022.

On 2 September 2023, Aydınlık joined English Championship side Hull City on a season-long loan deal.

== International career ==
Aydınlık is eligible to represent both the United States and Turkey at international level. In March 2022, he was called up to the United States men's national soccer team.

He has since gone on to represent Turkey at under-19 level.

== Career statistics ==
=== Club ===
As of 18 January 2025

Appearances and goals by club, season and competition
Club	Season	League			National Cup		League Cup		Continental		Other		Total	
Club	Season	Division	Apps	Goals	Apps	Goals	Apps	Goals	Apps	Goals	Apps	Goals	Apps	Goals
Fenerbahçe	2021–22	Süper Lig	0	0	0	0	—		0	0	14 (Note: Appearance(s) in Turkish U19 League)	3	14	3
Fenerbahçe	2022–23	Süper Lig	3 (Note: Appearance(s) in Rezerv Lig)	0	0	0	–		0	0	23	7	26	7
Fenerbahçe	Total		3	0	0	0	0	0	0	0	37	10	40	10
Hull City (loan)	2023–24	Championship	0	0	0	0	0	0	–		0	0	0	0
Beyoğlu Yeni Çarşı (loan)	2024–25	TFF 3. Lig	18	1	2	2	–		–		0	0	20	3
Career total			21	1	2	2	0	0	0	0	37	10	70	13
