= Seán Boyd (footballer) =

Irish footballer

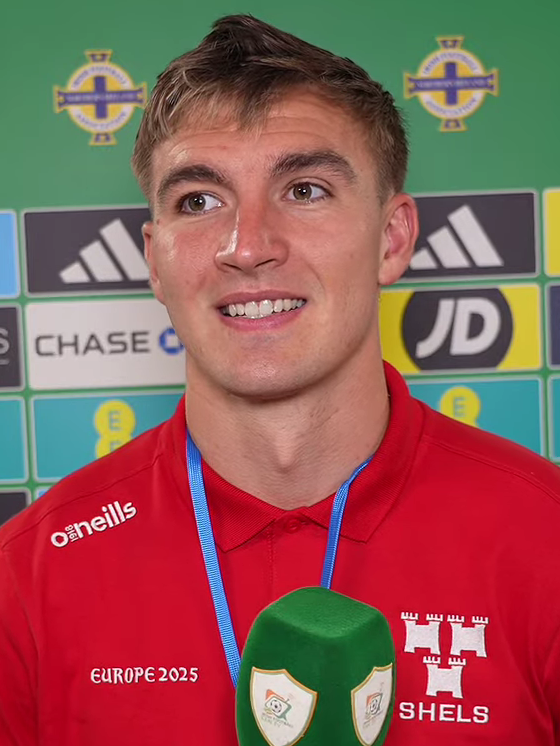
- Boyd with Shelbourne in 2025

Personal information
- Full name: Seán Boyd
- Date of birth: 20 June 1998 (age 28)
- Place of birth: Dublin, Ireland
- Height: 1.95 m (6 ft 5 in)
- Position: Striker

Team information
- Current team: Shelbourne
- Number: 9

Youth career
- –2014: Malahide United
- 2014–2015: Shamrock Rovers
- 2015–2016: Rivervalley Rangers
- 2016–2017: Shamrock Rovers

Senior career*
| Years | Team | Apps | (Gls) |
| 2015–2019 | Shamrock Rovers | 45 | (6) |
| 2019 | → Finn Harps (loan) | 14 | (2) |
| 2019 | → Longford Town (loan) | 5 | (2) |
| 2021 | Finn Harps | 26 | (4) |
| 2022– | Shelbourne | 116 | (32) |
- * Club domestic league appearances and goals as of 19:24, 10 November 2026 (UTC)

Seán Boyd (born 20 June 1998) is an Irish professional footballer who plays as a striker for League of Ireland Premier Division club Shelbourne. His previous clubs are Shamrock Rovers, Finn Harps (over 2 spells) and Longford Town.

== Career ==
=== Youth career ===
A native of Swords, Dublin, Boyd joined the academy of Shamrock Rovers from Malahide United in 2014, he remained there until December 2015 when he joined local Swords club Rivervalley Rangers, before rejoining Rovers academy ahead of their 2016 season.

=== Shamrock Rovers ===
Boyd made his senior debut for Shamrock Rovers on 28 April 2015, replacing Danny North from the bench in a 3–1 win away to Athlone Town in the Leinster Senior Cup. His first senior goal came on 20 April 2016, in a 3–0 win over Athlone Town in the League of Ireland Cup at Tallaght Stadium. His first league goal for the club came on 15 July 2016, when he scored the final goal of the game in a 3–1 win over Bohemians in the Dublin derby at Tallaght Stadium. His first full season with the club in 2016 saw him score 7 goals in 27 appearances. The following two seasons however saw him struggle for minutes due to persistent injuries, with just 3 of his 26 league appearances coming from the starting 11, while he scored just 1 league goal in that time.

==== Finn Harps loan ====
In February 2019, Boyd was loaned out to fellow League of Ireland Premier Division club Finn Harps until July, with Rovers manager Stephen Bradley adamant the loan deal would not be extended, stating "It's only until the summer, we just need him to get games, that's all. He had a frustrating time with little niggles here and there, nothing serious. But he just hasn't been able to get a run of games. We felt the best place for him to do that was out on loan but only until the summer.". He scored twice in his 14 appearances during his time with the club.

==== Longford Town loan ====
On 19 July 2019, Boyd was loaned out again, this time to League of Ireland First Division side Longford Town until the end of the season. He made just 5 appearances during his time with the club, scoring twice.

=== Injury ===
Having been let go by Shamrock Rovers at the end of his contract following the end of the 2019 season, Boyd trained with the PFAI training camp for players without a club in December 2019 and played a friendly against a Rochdale side at Bower Fold, but suffered an Anterior cruciate ligament injury to his knee, which would keep him out of action for a long term spell.

=== Return to Finn Harps ===
Having gone the entire of 2020 without a club, Boyd recovered from his injury in March 2021 and returned to his former loan club Finn Harps ahead of their 2021 League of Ireland Premier Division season. Boyd scored 8 goals in 30 appearances in all competitions in his first season back in football, including 4 goals in 4 games in the club's run to the FAI Cup Quarter Final, in which they were knocked out by Dundalk after a replay.

=== Shelbourne ===
On 27 November 2021, Boyd signed for newly promoted Shelbourne ahead of their first season back in the top flight, becoming newly appointed manager Damien Duff's first signing for the club. In September 2022, he signed a new contract with the club for 2023. Boyd scored 15 goals in 33 games in all competitions in his first season with the club, a career best season. On 13 November 2022, Boyd played the full 90 minutes of the 2022 FAI Cup final at the Aviva Stadium, which didn't go to plan for Boyd or Shels as his side suffered the heaviest FAI Cup final defeat in history by losing 4–0 to Derry City. He voted into the PFAI Premier Division Team of the Year for 2022 by his fellow professionals in the league. The following season was less successful for Boyd however, having started the first game of the season, he then suffered an abductor tear and a hernia, that kept him out of action for 4 months, despite this however, the club offered him a new contract until the end of the 2024 season, with the option of a further year in the club's favour, which he signed on 15 July 2023. He was named League of Ireland Player of the Month for the first time, for October 2024 after his 3 goals during the month helped propel the club to their first league title win in 18 years. He signed a new contract with the club in November 2024. In January 2025, Shelbourne declined a bid from Scottish Premiership club St Mirren for Boyd. Boyd signed a new long-term contract with the club in January 2025.

== Career statistics ==
As of match played on 30 October 2026

Appearances and goals by club, season and competition
| Club | Season | League | | | National Cup (Note: Includes FAI Cup) | | League Cup (Note: Includes League of Ireland Cup) | | Europe | | Other | | Total | |
| Club | Season | Division | Apps | Goals | Apps | Goals | Apps | Goals | Apps | Goals | Apps | Goals | Apps | Goals |
|---|---|---|---|---|---|---|---|---|---|---|---|---|---|---|
| Shamrock Rovers | 2015 | LOI Premier Division | 0 | 0 | 0 | 0 | 0 | 0 | 0 (Note: Appearance(s) in the UEFA Europa League) | 0 | 2 (Note: Appearance(s) in the Leinster Senior Cup) | 0 | 2 | 0 |
| Shamrock Rovers | 2016 | LOI Premier Division | 19 | 5 | 2 | 1 | 3 | 1 | 2 | 0 | 1 | 0 | 27 | 7 |
| Shamrock Rovers | 2017 | LOI Premier Division | 20 | 0 | 1 | 0 | 2 | 0 | 1 | 0 | 0 | 0 | 24 | 0 |
| Shamrock Rovers | 2018 | LOI Premier Division | 6 | 1 | 0 | 0 | 1 | 0 | 0 | 0 | 1 | 0 | 8 | 1 |
| Shamrock Rovers | 2019 | LOI Premier Division | 0 | 0 | – | | – | | – | | – | | 0 | 0 |
| Shamrock Rovers | Total | | 45 | 6 | 3 | 1 | 6 | 1 | 3 | 0 | 4 | 0 | 61 | 8 |
| Finn Harps (loan) | 2019 | LOI Premier Division | 14 | 2 | — | | 0 | 0 | — | | — | | 14 | 2 |
| Longford Town (loan) | 2019 | LOI First Division | 5 | 2 | 0 | 0 | — | | — | | 0 | 0 | 5 | 2 |
| Finn Harps | 2021 | LOI Premier Division | 26 | 4 | 4 | 4 | — | | — | | — | | 30 | 8 |
| Shelbourne | 2022 | LOI Premier Division | 29 | 11 | 4 | 4 | — | | — | | — | | 33 | 15 |
| Shelbourne | 2023 | LOI Premier Division | 10 | 4 | 1 | 0 | — | | — | | 0 | 0 | 11 | 4 |
| Shelbourne | 2024 | LOI Premier Division | 27 | 10 | 2 | 1 | — | | 3 (Note: Appearance(s) in the UEFA Conference League) | 0 | 0 | 0 | 32 | 11 |
| Shelbourne | 2025 | LOI Premier Division | 23 | 3 | 1 | 0 | — | | 9 (Note: 4 appearances in the UEFA Champions League; 1 appearance in the UEFA Europa League; 4 appearances in the UEFA Conference League) | 0 | 1 (Note: Appearance in the President of Ireland's Cup) | 1 | 34 | 4 |
| Shelbourne | 2026 | LOI Premier Division | 27 | 4 | 0 | 0 | — | | 0 | 0 | 0 | 0 | 27 | 4 |
| Shelbourne | Total | | 116 | 32 | 8 | 5 | — | | 12 | 0 | 1 | 1 | 137 | 38 |
| Career total | | | 206 | 46 | 15 | 10 | 6 | 1 | 15 | 0 | 5 | 1 | 245 | 58 |

== Honours ==
=== Club ===
Shelbourne

- League of Ireland Premier Division (1): 2024
- President of Ireland's Cup: 2025

=== Individual ===
- PFAI Premier Division Team of the Year (1): 2022
- League of Ireland Player of the Month (1): October 2024
