= 2024 Shelbourne F.C. season =

Irish football club season review

Shelbourne
2024 season
- CEO: Barry Mocke
- Head Coach: Damien Duff
- Stadium: Tolka Park, Dublin
- Premier Division: 1st (Champions)
- Leinster Senior Cup: Quarter final
- FAI Cup: Quarter Finals
- UEFA Conference League: Second Qualifying Round
- Top goalscorer: League: Seán Boyd (10); All: Seán Boyd (11)
- Highest home attendance: 4,855 v Bohemians, 12 April 2024
- Lowest home attendance: 3,586 v Waterford, 17 May 2024
Home colours	Away colours	Third colours
- All statistics correct as of 16:45 26 Oct 2024 (UTC).

The 2024 Shelbourne F.C. season was the club's 129th season in existence, their third season back in the League of Ireland Premier Division following promotion from the League of Ireland First Division in 2021, and their first season back in European competition since 2006, competing in the 2024-25 UEFA Conference League.

In May 2024, Dublin City Council voted in favour of granting the club a 250-year lease on Tolka Park.

On the 1st of November 2024, a late goal by Harry Wood sealed a 1–0 win away to Derry City, confirming Shelbourne as the champions of the 2024 League of Ireland Premier Division, their first league title for eighteen years. The match attracted a record TV audience for a domestic game in Ireland.

Defender Paddy Barrett and midfielder and club captain Mark Coyle were named in 2024 PFAI Team of the Year, while Damien Duff was named Manager of the Year.

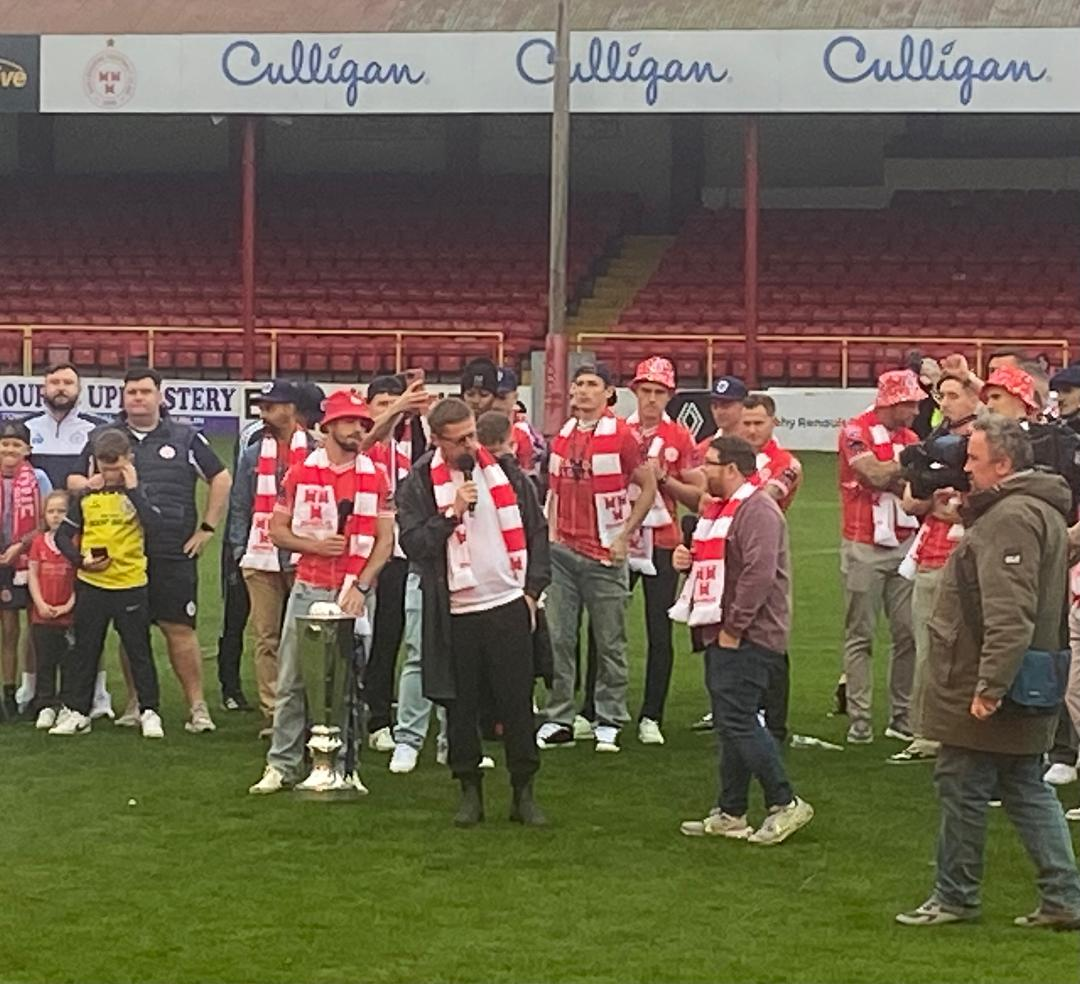
Manager Damien Duff addresses fans at League homecoming celebrations Tolka Park 2 November 2024

== First team squad ==
Players' ages are as of the opening day of the 2024 season.

#	Name	Nationality	Position	Date of birth (age)	Previous club	Signed	Notes
Goalkeepers
1	Conor Kearns	(Republic of Ireland)	GK	6 May 1998 (aged 25)	Galway United	2023	
19	Lorcan Healy	(Republic of Ireland)	GK	9 January 2001 (aged 22)	UCD	2024	
25	Daithi Folan	(Republic of Ireland)	GK	11 August 2005 (aged 18)	Youth Team	2023	
50	Ali Topcu	(Republic of Ireland)	GK	1 April 2008 (aged 16)	Youth Team	2024	
Defenders
2	Sean Gannon	(Republic of Ireland)	DF	11 July 1991 (aged 32)	Shamrock Rovers	2024	
3	Tyreke Wilson	(Republic of Ireland)	DF	2 December 1999 (aged 24)	Bohemians	2023	
4	Kameron Ledwidge	(Republic of Ireland)	DF	7 April 2001 (aged 22)	Southampton	2021	
5	Shane Griffin	(Republic of Ireland)	DF	8 September 1994 (aged 29)	St Patrick's Athletic	2022	
15	Sam Bone	(England)	DF	6 February 1998 (aged 26)	Maidstone United	2024	Signed mid-season
29	Paddy Barrett	(Republic of Ireland)	DF	22 July 1993 (aged 30)	St Patrick's Athletic	2023	
51	Richard Offor	(Republic of Ireland)	DF	26 August 2007 (aged 16)	Youth Team	2024	
Midfielders
6	Jonathan Lunney	(Republic of Ireland)	MF	2 February 1998 (aged 25)	Bohemian	2021	
7	Harry Wood	(England)	MF	2 August 2002 (aged 21)	Hull City	2024	Signed mid-season
8	Mark Coyle	(Republic of Ireland)	MF	13 February 1997 (aged 27)	Finn Harps	2022	Captain
14	Ali Coote	(Scotland)	MF	11 June 1998 (aged 26)	Detroit City	2024	Signed mid-season
16	John O’Sullivan	(Republic of Ireland)	MF	18 September 1993 (aged 30)	Bohemians	2024	
27	Evan Caffrey	(Republic of Ireland)	MF	27 February 2003 (aged 20)	UCD	2023	
42	Cian Doyle	(Republic of Ireland)	MF	7 January 2005 (aged 19)	Youth Team	2024	
67	Liam Burt	(Scotland)	MF	1 February 1999 (aged 25)	Shamrock Rovers	2024	On loan from Shamrock Rovers
Attackers
9	Seán Boyd	(Republic of Ireland)	FW	20 June 1998 (aged 25)	Finn Harps	2022	
10	John Martin	(Republic of Ireland)	FW	13 March 1997 (aged 26)	Dundalk	2024	
11	Matty Smith	(Scotland)	FW	13 March 1997 (aged 26)	Derry City	2023	
22	Dean Williams	(Republic of Ireland)	FW	9 February 2000 (aged 24)	Bohemians	2024	
44	Daniel Ring	(Republic of Ireland)	FW	3 February 2007 (aged 17)	Youth Team	2024	
48	Aiden O'Brien	(Republic of Ireland)	FW	4 October 1993 (aged 30)	Free Agent	2024	Signed mid-season
77	Rayhaan Tulloch	(England)	FW	20 January 2001 (aged 23)	Shrewsbury Town F.C.	2024	Signed mid-season
Players who departed before the end of the season
12	Jad Hakiki	(Republic of Ireland)	MF	23 June 2004 (aged 19)	Youth Team	2022	Signed for Dundalk
17	Shane Farrell	(Republic of Ireland)	MF	26 June 2000 (aged 23)	Finglas United	2018	Signed for Drogheda United
20	Keith Ward	(Republic of Ireland)	MF	12 October 1990 (aged 33)	Dundalk	2024	Released by mutual consent
21	Gavin Molloy	(Republic of Ireland)	DF	19 October 2001 (aged 22)	Youth Team	2022	Signed for Aberdeen
24	Lewis Temple	(Republic of Ireland)	DF	11 June 2005 (aged 18)	Youth Team	2022	On loan to Wexford F.C.
36	Will Jarvis	(England)	FW	17 December 2002 (aged 21)	Hull City	2023	recalled by Hull City
43	Mark Isong	(Republic of Ireland)	FW	21 January 2006 (aged 18)	Youth Team	2024	Signed for Bolton Wanderers F.C.

== Transfers ==
Transfers in

Date	Position	Nationality	Name	Previous club	Ref.
22 November 2023	DF	(Republic of Ireland)	Sean Gannon	Shamrock Rovers	
22 November 2023	MF	(Republic of Ireland)	Keith Ward	Dundalk	
29 November 2023	FW	(Republic of Ireland)	Dean Williams	Bohemians	
30 November 2023	GK	(Republic of Ireland)	Lorcan Healy	UCD	
8 December 2023	MF	(Republic of Ireland)	John O’Sullivan	Bohemians	
8 December 2023	FW	(Republic of Ireland)	John Martin	Dundalk	
18 June 2024	MF	(Scotland)	Ali Coote	(United States) Detroit City	
18 June 2024	DF	(England)	Sam Bone	(England) Maidstone United	
1 July 2024	MF	(England)	Harry Wood	(England) Hull City	
10 July 2024	FW	(England)	Rayhaan Tulloch	(England) Shrewsbury Town F.C.	
12 August 2024	FW	(Republic of Ireland)	Aiden O'Brien	Free Agent	

Loans in

Date	Position	Nationality	Name	Previous club	Date Ended	Ref.
22 December 2023	MF	(Scotland)	Liam Burt	Shamrock Rovers	Season-long loan	
30 January 2023	FW	(England)	Will Jarvis	(England) Hull City	Season-long loan	

Transfers out

Date	Position	Nationality	Name	To	Ref.
6 November 2023	FW	(Republic of Ireland)	Jack Moylan	(England) Lincoln City	
6 November 2023	DF	(Republic of Ireland)	John Ross Wilson	Sligo Rovers	
13 November 2023	MF	(England)	Harry Wood	Loan Return to (England) Hull City	
23 November 2023	DF	(Republic of Ireland)	Luke Byrne	Retired	
26 November 2023	DF	(Portugal)	Euclides Cabral	(Switzerland) Neuchâtel Xamax	
26 November 2023	DF	(Republic of Ireland)	Andrew Quinn	Drogheda United	
30 November 2023	GK	(England)	Harry Fisk	Released	
1 December 2023	DF	(Republic of Ireland)	David Toure	(Northern Ireland) Glenavon	
13 December 2022	DF	(Republic of Ireland)	Conor Kane	Drogheda United	
13 December 2023	MF	(Republic of Ireland)	Gavin Hodgins	(Northern Ireland) Glenavon	
10 January 2024	FW	(Republic of Ireland)	Gbemi Arubi	Waterford	
26 January 2024	DF	(Republic of Ireland)	Luke Browne	(England) Crystal Palace	
14 February 2024	MF	(Republic of Ireland)	Brian McManus	Bohemians	
14 June 2024	DF	(Republic of Ireland)	Gavin Molloy	(Scotland) Aberdeen	
1 July 2024	MF	(Republic of Ireland)	Jad Hakiki	Dundalk	
1 July 2024	MF	(Republic of Ireland)	Shane Farrell	Drogheda United	
3 July 2024	DF	(Republic of Ireland)	Lewis Temple	Wexford	
23 July 2024	MF	(Republic of Ireland)	Keith Ward	Released	
6 August 2024	FW	(England)	Will Jarvis	Recalled from loan	
3 September 2024	FW	(Republic of Ireland)	Mark Isong	(England) Bolton Wanderers	

== Competitions ==
Overview

=== Overall record ===
Competition	First match	Last match	Starting round	Final position	Record							
Competition	First match	Last match	Starting round	Final position	Pld	W	D	L	GF	GA	GD	Win %
Premier Division	17 February 2024	1 November 2024	Matchday 1		29	14	11	4	32	19	+13	48.28
Leinster Senior Cup	8 February 2024	24 March 2024	Group stage	Quarter-finals	4	1	1	2	4	9	−5	25.00
FAI Cup	21 July 2023		Second round		3	1	2	0	2	1	+1	33.33
UEFA Conference League	11 July 2023	1 August 2024	First Qualifying Round	Second Qualifying Round	4	1	2	1	3	4	−1	25.00
Total					40	17	16	7	41	33	+8	42.50

Last updated: 6 September 2024
Source: Competitions

Competition	First match	Latest match	Record							
Competition	First match	Latest match	Pld	W	D	L	GF	GA	GD	Win %
Premier Division	17 February 2024	13 June 2024	29	14	11	4	33	20	+13	50
Leinster Senior Cup	24 March 2023	3 July 2023	3	2	0	2	9	4	+5	66.67
FAI Cup	21 July 2023		2	2	0	0	2	1	+1	100
UEFA Conference League	11 July 2024	18 July 2024	4	1	2	1	3	5	−2	25
Total			32	17	10	6	42	25	+17	54.84

=== League of Ireland ===
Pos	Team	Pld	W	D	L	GF	GA	GD	Pts	Qualification or relegation
1	Shelbourne (C)	36	17	12	7	40	27	+13	63	Qualification for Champions League first qualifying round
2	Shamrock Rovers	36	17	10	9	50	35	+15	61	Qualification for Conference League second qualifying round (Note: Drogheda United were expelled from the Conference League second qualifying round which they qualified as the 2024 FAI Cup winners, as their owners Trivela Group also own Danish club Silkeborg, who finished seventh in Danish Superliga. Due to the multi-club ownership rule, only Silkeborg could be admitted to the Conference League as they have a higher league position. As no team from Republic of Ireland could replace them because of UEFA licensing issues, the second-placed Shamrock Rovers were moved from the first qualifying round to the second qualifying round along with Dinamo City of Albania, the next highest association cup winners.)
3	St Patrick's Athletic	36	17	8	11	51	37	+14	59	Qualification for Conference League first qualifying round
4	Derry City	36	14	13	9	48	31	+17	55	
5	Galway United	36	13	13	10	33	29	+4	52	
6	Sligo Rovers	36	13	10	13	40	51	−11	49	
7	Waterford	36	13	6	17	43	47	−4	45	
8	Bohemians	36	10	12	14	39	43	−4	42	
9	Drogheda United (O)	36	7	13	16	41	58	−17	34	Qualification for promotion/relegation play-off
10	Dundalk (R)	36	5	11	20	23	50	−27	26	Relegation to League of Ireland First Division

Source: SSE Airtricity League, Soccerway
Rules for classification: 1) Points; 2) Goal difference; 3) Goals scored.
(C) Champions; (O) Play-off winners; (R) Relegated

==== Matches ====
16 February 2024 1	Waterford	1–1	Shelbourne	Waterford
19:45 IST	Asamoah 2'	Report	Seán Boyd 74', (red card) 84'	Stadium: Waterford Regional Sports Centre; Attendance: 4,390; Referee: Kevin O’Sullivan

23 February 2024 2	Shelbourne	2–1	Shamrock Rovers	Drumcondra, Dublin
19:45 IST	Mark Coyle 15'; Will Jarvis 25'	Report	Gaffney 49'	Stadium: Tolka Park; Attendance: 4,755; Referee: Rob Harvey

1 March 2024 3	Sligo Rovers	0–1	Shelbourne	Sligo
19:45 IST		Report	O’Sullivan 12'	Stadium: The Showgrounds; Attendance: 3,087; Referee: Declan Toland

4 March 2024 4	Shelbourne	1–0	Galway United	Drumcondra, Dublin
19:45 IST	John Martin 15'	Report		Stadium: Tolka Park; Attendance: 3,773; Referee: Rob Hennessy

8 March 2024 5	Bohemians	0–2	Shelbourne	Phibsborough, Dublin
19:45 IST		Report	Will Jarvis 80' (pen.); Molloy 85'	Stadium: Dalymount Park; Attendance: 4,429; Referee: Paul McLaughlin

15 March 2024 6	St Patrick's Athletic	1–2	Shelbourne	Inchicore, Dublin
19:45 IST	Mulraney 72'	Report	Will Jarvis 49', 58'	Stadium: Richmond Park; Attendance: 4.988; Referee: Rob Harvey

29 March 2024 7	Shelbourne	2–1	Dundalk	Drumcondra, Dublin
19:45 IST	Burt 51' own goal 74'	Report	Benson 90'	Stadium: Tolka Park; Attendance: 4,012; Referee: Damien McGrath

1 April 2023 8	Shelbourne	0–0	Derry City	Drumcondra, Dublin
17:00 IST		Report		Stadium: Tolka Park; Attendance: 3,932; Referee: Eoghan O’Shea

5 April 2024 9	Drogheda	2–2	Shelbourne	Drogheda, County Louth
19:45 IST	Gallagher 21'; Weir 70'	Report	Mark Coyle 45'; Seán Boyd 90'	Stadium: Weavers Park; Attendance: 2,232; Referee: Robert Hennessy

12 April 2024 10	Shelbourne	1–2	Bohemians	Drumcondra, Dublin
19:45 IST	Will Jarvis 63' (pen.)	Report	Flores 37', 40' (pen.)	Stadium: Tolka Park; Attendance: 4,855; Referee: Paul McLaughlin

19 April 2024 11	Galway United	1–0	Shelbourne	Galway
19:45 IST	Edward McCarthy 24'	Report		Stadium: Eamonn Deacy Park; Attendance: 2,873; Referee: Damien McGraith

22 April 2024 12	Shelbourne	0–0	Shamrock Rovers	Drumcondra, Dublin
19:45 IST	Shane Farrell (red card) 76'	Report		Stadium: Tolka Park; Attendance: 4,628; Referee: Robert Hennessy

26 April 2024 13	Shelbourne	1–0	St Patrick's Athletic	Drumcondra, Dublin
19:45 IST	John Martin 33'	Report		Stadium: Tolka Park; Attendance: 4,755; Referee: Robert Hennessy

3 May 2023 14	Dundalk	0–0	Shelbourne	Dundalk, County Louth
19:45 IST		Report		Stadium: Oriel Park; Attendance: 2,806; Referee: Eoghan O’Shea

6 May 2024 15	Derry City	1–1	Shelbourne	Derry
19:45 IST	McMullan 56'	Report	Seán Boyd 89'	Stadium: Brandywell Stadium; Attendance: 2,578; Referee: Paul McLaughlin

10 May 2024 16	Shelbourne	1–1	Drogheda	Drumcondra, Dublin
19:45 IST	Seán Boyd 60'	Report	Frantz Pierrot 3'	Stadium: Tolka Park; Attendance: 3,598; Referee: Gavin Colfer

17 May 2024 17	Shelbourne	1–0	Waterford	Drumcondra, Dublin
19:45 IST	Seán Boyd 72'	Report		Stadium: Tolka Park; Attendance: 3,586; Referee: Rob Harvey

20 May 2024 18	St Patrick's Athletic	1–2	Shelbourne	Inchicore, Dublin
19:45 IST	Mulraney 73'	Report	Seán Boyd 14'; Evan Caffrey 96'	Stadium: Richmond Park; Attendance: 4,811; Referee: Robert Hennessy

24 May 2024 19	Shamrock Rovers	0–2	Shelbourne	Tallaght, Dublin
19:45 IST	Lopes (red card) 56'	Report	Will Jarvis 19', 58' (pen.)	Stadium: Tallaght Stadium; Attendance: 4,811; Referee: Paul McLaughlin

31 May 2024 20	Shelbourne	1–2	Sligo Rovers	Drumcondra, Dublin
19:45 IST	Seán Boyd 57'	Report	Kailin Barlow 22'; Hartmann 69'	Stadium: Tolka Park

7 June 2024 21	Shelbourne	1–0	Dundalk	Drumcondra, Dublin
19:45 IST	John Martin 71'	Report		Stadium: Tolka Park

14 June 2024 22	Waterford	0–1	Shelbourne	Waterford
19:45 IST		Report	Will Jarvis 55'	Stadium: Waterford Regional Sports Centre

28 June 2024 23	Shelbourne	2–0	Galway United	Drumcondra, Dublin
19:45 IST	John Martin 11'; Evan Caffrey 36'	Report	Aodh Dervin (red card) 89'	Stadium: Tolka Park; Attendance: 3,643

4 July 2024 24	Drogheda United	1–1	Shelbourne	Drogheda, County Louth
19:45 IST	Douglas Taylor 84' (pen.)	Report	Wilson 21', (red card) 81'; Paddy Barrett (red card) 79'	Stadium: Weavers Park

5 August 2024 25	Shelbourne	0–0	Derry City	Drumcondra, Dublin
19:45 IST		Report	Sam Todd (red card) 35'	Stadium: Tolka Park

10 August 2024 26	Sligo Rovers	2–1	Shelbourne	Sligo
19:45 IST	Will Fitzgerald 24'; Wilson Waweru 65'	Report	Evan Caffrey 57'	Stadium: The Showgrounds

23 August 2024 27	Shelbourne	1–1	Bohemians	Drumcondra, Dublin
19:45 IST	Coote 14'	Report	Grant 12'	Stadium: Tolka Park; Attendance: 4930; Referee: Damien MacGraith

30 August 2023 28	Dundalk	0–1	Shelbourne	Dundalk, County Louth
19:45 IST		Report	O'Brien 5'	Stadium: Oriel Park; Attendance: 2,234; Referee: Eoghan O’Shea

6 September 2024 29	Bohemians	1–1	Shelbourne	Phibsborough, Dublin
19:45 IST	Tierney 83'	Report	Smith 59'	Stadium: Dalymount Park; Attendance: 4,429; Referee: Neil Doyle

6 September 2024 30	Galway United	1–0	Shelbourne	Galway
19:45 IST	Jimmy Keohane 2'			Stadium: Eamonn Deacy Park

27 September 2024 31	Shelbourne	0–0	Sligo Rovers	Drumcondra, Dublin
19:45 IST				Stadium: Tolka Park

30 September 2024 32	Shelbourne	2–3	St. Patrick's Athletic	Drumcondra, Dublin
19:45 IST	Rayhaan Tulloch 76', Matty Smith 80' (red card) 93'		Joe Redmond 22', Brandon Kavanagh 62', Al-Amin Kazeem 88'	Stadium: Tolka Park

06 October 2024 33	Shamrock Rovers	2–0	Shelbourne	Tallaght, Dublin
17.30 IST	Jack Byrne 18', Neil Farrugia 85'			Stadium: Tallaght Stadium

18 October 2024 34	Shelbourne	3–1	Waterford United	Drumcondra, Dublin
19.45 IST	Seán Boyd 40, 80' (pen.), Liam Burt 84'		Padraig Amond 37' (pen.)	Stadium: Tolka Park; Attendance: 4755; Referee: Rob Henessey

25 October 2024 35	Shelbourne	2–1	Drogheda United	Drumcondra, Dublin
19.45 IST	Seán Boyd 10', Rayhaan Tulloch 54'		Bridel Bosakani 67'	Stadium: Tolka Park; Attendance: 4755; Referee: Neil Doyle

1 November 2024 36	Derry City	0–1	Shelbourne	Derry
19.45 IST			Harry Wood 84'	Stadium: Brandywell Stadium; Attendance: 3135; Referee: Paul McLaughlin

=== Leinster Senior Cup ===
8 February 2024 Group stage	Wexford	4–4	Shelbourne	Carlow
	Cian Curtis 15'; Thomas Oluwa 17', 62', 84'		Cian Doyle 48'; Sean Cummins 68', 68'; Cillian Kavanagh 80'	Stadium: IT Carlow; Referee: Gavin Colfer

30 January 2024 Group stage	Shelbourne	4–1	Evergreen	Drumcondra
	Charles McGee 27'; Daniel Bergin 45+1' (pen.); Tyreik Sammy 85'; Dylan Atanda 90+5'		Ify Nzewi 24'	Stadium: Tolka Park; Referee: Mark Houlihan

5 February 2024 Group stage	Bray Wanderers	2–0	Shelbourne	Bray
	Shane Griffin 25'; Christian Magerusan 28'	Report		Stadium: Carlisle Grounds; Attendance: 600 (Est.); Referee: Rob Hennessy

24 March 2024 Quarter-final	Maynooth University Town	4–1	Shelbourne	Maynooth
	Cillian Duffy 48'; Patrick O'Sullivan 65', 80'; Callum Warfield 67'		Daragh Murtagh 7'	Stadium: NUI Maynooth Astro; Referee: Oliver Moran

=== FAI Cup ===
21 July 2024 2nd Round	Bray Wanderers	0–1	Shelbourne	Bray
15:15 IST		Report	Seán Boyd 15'	Stadium: Carlisle Grounds; Attendance: 2,339; Referee: Paul Norton

16 August 2024 3rd Round	Shelbourne	1–1 (a.e.t.) (5–3 p)	Galway United	Drumcondra
	O'Brien 94'	Report	Keohane 116'	Stadium: Tolka Park
	Penalties
	O'Brien (penalty scored); Lunney (penalty scored); Coyle (penalty scored); Coote (penalty scored); Burt (penalty scored)		Hurley (penalty scored); Keohane (penalty scored); Clarke (penalty scored); Buckley (penalty missed)

14 September 2024 Quarter Final	Derry City	2–0	Shelbourne	Derry
19:45 IST	Michael Duffy 22', Danny Mullen 64',			Stadium: Brandywell Stadium; Attendance: 2,339

=== UEFA Conference League ===
==== First Qualifying Round ====
11 July 2024 First leg	Shelbourne (Republic of Ireland)	2–1	(Gibraltar) St Joseph's F.C.	Drumondra
19:45 IST	Mark Coyle 1'; Jarvis 58' (pen.)	Report	Francisco Paul Curado 40'	Stadium: Tolka Park; Attendance: 3,643

18 July 2024 Second leg	St Joseph's F.C. (Gibraltar)	1–1 (2–3 agg.)	(Republic of Ireland) Shelbourne	Gibraltar
17:00 IST	Liam Walker 25'; Gonzalo Paz (red card) 93'	Report	Sam Bone 34'; Gannon (red card) 92'	Stadium: Europa Point Stadium; Attendance: 763; Referee: Ladislav Szikszay

==== Second Qualifying Round ====
25 July 2024 First leg	Zürich (Switzerland)	3–0	(Republic of Ireland) Shelbourne	Zurich
	Mathew 1'; Marchesano 29', 58'	Report		Stadium: Letzigrund; Attendance: 8,766; Referee: Visar Kastrati

1 August 2024 Second leg	Shelbourne (Republic of Ireland)	0–0 (0–3 agg.)	(Switzerland) Zürich	Drumcondra, Dublin
		Report		Stadium: Tolka Park; Attendance: 3,665; Referee: Robertas Valikonis

== Statistics ==
=== Appearances and goals ===
No	Pos	Nat	Name	League		FAI Cup		Europe		Total	
No	Pos	Nat	Name	Apps	Goals	Apps	Goals	Apps	Goals	Apps	Goals
1	GK	(Republic of Ireland)	Conor Kearns	36	0	2	0	4	0	42	0
2	DF	(Republic of Ireland)	Sean Gannon	33	0	1	0	2	0	36	0
3	DF	(Republic of Ireland)	Tyreke Wilson	27 (5)	1	1	0	4	0	32 (5)	1
4	DF	(Republic of Ireland)	Kameron Ledwidge	22 (11)	0	2 (1)	0	4	0	28 (12)	0
5	DF	(Republic of Ireland)	Shane Griffin	8 (4)	0	1	0	2 (1)	0	11 (5)	0
6	MF	(Republic of Ireland)	Jonathan Lunney	29 (2)	0	1 (1)	0	3 (1)	0	33 (4)	0
7	MF	(England)	Harry Wood	7 (6)	1	3	0	1 (3)	0	11 (9)	1
8	MF	(Republic of Ireland)	Mark Coyle	31	2	2	0	3	1	36	3
9	FW	(Republic of Ireland)	Seán Boyd	12 (13)	10	1 (1)	1	0 (3)	0	12 (17)	11
10	FW	(Republic of Ireland)	John Martin	20 (9)	4	1 (1)	0	3	0	24 (10)	4
11	FW	(Scotland)	Matty Smith	18 (11)	2	2 (1)	0	2 (2)	0	22 (14)	2
14	MF	(Scotland)	Ali Coote	8 (5)	1	2 (1)	0	2 (2)	0	12 (8)	1
15	DF	(England)	Sam Bone	2 (2)	0	1 (2)	0	2 (2)	1	5 (6)	1
16	MF	(Republic of Ireland)	John O'Sullivan	12 (12)	1	2	0	2 (1)	0	16 (13)	1
22	FW	(Republic of Ireland)	Dean Williams	1 (10)	0	0	0	0	0	1 (10)	0
25	GK	(Republic of Ireland)	Daithi Folan	0	0	0	0	0	0	0	0
27	MF	(Republic of Ireland)	Evan Caffrey	17 (17)	3	2 (1)	0	1 (3)	0	16 (21)	3
29	DF	(Republic of Ireland)	Paddy Barrett	30 (1)	0	1	0	4	0	32 (1)	0
44	FW	(Republic of Ireland)	Daniel Ring	0 (1)	0	0	0	0	0	0 (1)	0
48	FW	(Republic of Ireland)	Aiden O'Brien	5 (3)	1	0 (1)	1	0	0	5 (4)	2
67	MF	(Scotland)	Liam Burt	22 (9)	2	0 (2)	0	1 (1)	0	23 (12)	2
77	FW	(England)	Rayhaan Tulloch	7 (3)	2	2 (1)	0	0 (2)	0	9 (6)	2
50	GK	(Republic of Ireland)	Ali Topcu	0	0	0	0	0	0	0	0
43	FW	(Republic of Ireland)	Mark Isong	0 (1)	0	0	0	0	0	0 (1)	0
12	MF	(Republic of Ireland)	Jad Hakiki	0 (4)	0	0	0	0	0	0 (4)	0
17	MF	(Republic of Ireland)	Shane Farrell	2 (13)	0	0	0	0	0	2 (13)	0
20	MF	(Republic of Ireland)	Keith Ward	0 (2)	0	0	0	0	0	0 (2)	0
21	DF	(Republic of Ireland)	Gavin Molloy	22	1	0	0	0	0	22	1
24	DF	(Republic of Ireland)	Lewis Temple	1 (1)	0	0	0	0	0	1 (1)	0
36	FW	(England)	Will Jarvis	23 (2)	8	0 (1)	0	4	1	27 (3)	9

· Players listed in italics left the club mid-season

· Source: extratime.com

=== Goalscorers ===
No	Pos	Nat	Player	LOI	FAIC	UECL	Total
9	FW	(Republic of Ireland)	Seán Boyd	10	1	0	11
36	FW	(England)	Will Jarvis	8	0	1	9
10	FW	(Republic of Ireland)	John Martin	4	0	0	4
27	MF	(Republic of Ireland)	Evan Caffrey	3	0	0	3
8	MF	(Republic of Ireland)	Mark Coyle	2	0	1	3
67	MF	(Scotland)	Liam Burt	2	0	0	2
77	FW	(England)	Rayhaan Tulloch	2	0	0	2
11	FW	(Scotland)	Matty Smith	2	0	0	2
48	FW	(Republic of Ireland)	Aiden O'Brien	1	1	0	2
7	MF	(England)	Harry Wood	1	0	0	1
16	MF	(Republic of Ireland)	John O’Sullivan	1	0	0	1
3	DF	(Republic of Ireland)	Tyreke Wilson	1	0	0	1
15	DF	(England)	Sam Bone	0	0	1	1
14	MF	(Scotland)	Ali Coote	1	0	0	1
21	DF	(Republic of Ireland)	Gavin Molloy	1	0	0	1
Own Goal				1	0	0	0
Total				40	2	3	45
Italics indicates player left mid-season Source: extratime.com
