= Will Jarvis (footballer) =

English footballer

William Jarvis
Personal information
- Full name: William Robert Jarvis
- Date of birth: 17 December 2002 (age 23)
- Place of birth: York, England
- Height: 1.85 m (6 ft 1 in)
- Position: Forward

Team information
- Current team: Shelbourne

Youth career
- 2014–2021: Hull City

Senior career*
Years	Team	Apps	(Gls)
2021–2025	Hull City	9	(0)
2022	→ York City (loan)	1	(0)
2022	→ Scarborough Athletic (loan)	7	(3)
2022	→ Scarborough Athletic (loan)	5	(1)
2023	→ Shelbourne (loan)	12	(3)
2024	→ Shelbourne (loan)	25	(8)
2025–2026	Notts County	25	(2)
2026–	Shelbourne	22	(1)
- * Club domestic league appearances and goals as of 20:01, 10 November 2026 (UTC)

William Robert Jarvis (born 17 December 2002) is an English professional footballer who plays as a forward for League of Ireland Premier Division club Shelbourne. Jarvis is left-footed but has played on both right and left-wings during his career.

== Career ==
Jarvis signed his first professional contract with Hull City on 4 March 2021. He made his professional debut with Hull City in a 1–1 (7–8) EFL Cup penalty shootout loss to Wigan Athletic on 10 August 2021, and was one of his side's scorers in the shootout.

On 27 January 2022, Jarvis joined York City on a month-long loan.

On 18 March 2022, Jarvis joined Scarborough Athletic on loan until the end of the season.

On 16 August 2022, Jarvis rejoined Scarborough Athletic on a month-long loan.

On 28 July 2023, he signed for League of Ireland Premier Division club Shelbourne on loan until the end of their season in November. On 30 January 2024, Jarvis returned on loan to Shelbourne for the 2024 League of Ireland Premier Division season. On 6 August 2024, Jarvis was recalled by his parent club.

Four days later, on 10 August 2024, he came off the bench for the opening game of the 2024–25 season, a 1–1 home draw with Bristol City.

On 6 January 2025, Jarvis joined EFL League Two club Notts County on a permanent basis on a three-and-a-half year contract for an undisclosed fee.

On 5 February 2026, Jarvis returned to his former loan club Shelbourne on a permanent basis for an undisclosed fee.

== Career statistics ==
As of match played on 14 September 2026

Appearances and goals by club, season and competition
Club	Season	League			National Cup (Note: Includes FA Cup & FAI Cup)		League Cup (Note: Includes EFL Cup)		Other		Total	
Club	Season	Division	Apps	Goals	Apps	Goals	Apps	Goals	Apps	Goals	Apps	Goals
Hull City	2021–22	Championship	1	0	0	0	1	0	—		2	0
Hull City	2022–23	Championship	2	0	0	0	0	0	—		2	0
Hull City	2023–24	Championship	0	0	0	0	0	0	—		0	0
Hull City	2024–25	Championship	6	0	0	0	1	0	—		7	0
Hull City	Total		9	0	0	0	2	0	0	0	11	0
York City (loan)	2021–22	National League North	1	0	—		—		1 (Note: Appearance(s) in FA Trophy)	0	2	0
Scarborough Athletic (loan)	2021–22	NPL Premier Division	7	3	—		—		3 (Note: Two appearance in NPL Premier Division play-offs, one appearance and one goal in North Riding Senior Cup)	1	10	4
Scarborough Athletic (loan)	2022–23	National League North	5	1	0	0	—		0	0	5	1
Scarborough Athletic (loan)	Total		12	4	0	0	0	0	3	1	15	5
Shelbourne (loan)	2023	League of Ireland Premier Division	12	3	0	0	—		—		12	3
Shelbourne (loan)	2024	League of Ireland Premier Division	25	8	1	0	—		4 (Note: Appearance(s) in UEFA Conference League)	1	30	9
Notts County	2024–25	League Two	23	2	—		—		2 (Note: Appearances in 2025 EFL League Two Playoffs)	0	25	2
Notts County	2025–26	League Two	2	0	1	0	0	0	3 (Note: Appearance(s) in EFL Trophy)	0	6	0
Notts County	Total		25	2	1	0	0	0	5	0	31	2
Shelbourne	2026	League of Ireland Premier Division	22	1	1	0	—		3	0	26	1
Career total			106	18	3	0	2	0	16	2	127	20
