= Henry Sandat =

English footballer (born 2005)

Personal information
- Full name: Henry Neil Sandat
- Date of birth: 22 March 2005 (age 21)
- Place of birth: Chalkwell, England
- Height: 1.89 m (6 ft 2 in)
- Position: Forward

Team information
- Current team: Hornchurch
- Number: 11

Youth career
- 2013–2022: Southend United
- 2023–2025: Hull City

Senior career*
Years	Team	Apps	(Gls)
2022–2023	Southend United	12	(1)
2023–2025	Hull City	0	(0)
2023–2024	→ Southend United (loan)	15	(2)
2024–2025	→ Wealdstone (loan)	14	(1)
2025	Sutton United	11	(0)
2025	→ Hornchurch (loan)	11	(0)
2025–	Hornchurch	12	(5)
- * Club domestic league appearances and goals as of 10:34, 21 February 2026 (UTC)

Henry Neil Sandat (born 22 March 2005) is an English professional footballer who plays as a forward for National League club Hornchurch.

== Career ==
=== Southend United ===
Sandat came through the academy ranks at his hometown club Southend United before making his first team debut on 26 November 2022, coming on as a substitute in a 2–0 away defeat to Aldershot Town. He scored his first goal for the Shrimpers on 18 February 2023, which turned out to be the winner in a 1–0 victory over Gateshead at Roots Hall.

=== Hull City ===
Sandat signed for EFL Championship club Hull City on 31 July 2023, initially joining their academy setup. On 23 December 2023, he was loaned back to Southend for one month, before having the loan extended for the remainder of the 2023–24 season.

==== Wealdstone (loan) ====
On 2 August 2024, Sandat joined Wealdstone of the National League on a season-long loan.

=== Sutton United ===
On 9 January 2025, Sandat was recalled from his loan spell with Wealdstone to allow him to join National League side Sutton United.

== Career statistics ==
Appearances and goals by club, season and competition
Club	Season	League			FA Cup		EFL Cup		Other		Total	
Club	Season	Division	Apps	Goals	Apps	Goals	Apps	Goals	Apps	Goals	Apps	Goals
Southend United	2022–23	National League	12	1	0	0	—		1 (Note: Appearance(s) in Essex Senior Cup)	0	13	1
Hull City	2023–24	Championship	0	0	0	0	0	0	—		0	0
Hull City	2024–25	Championship	0	0	0	0	0	0	—		0	0
Hull City	Total		0	0	0	0	0	0	—		0	0
Southend United (loan)	2023–24	National League	15	2	—		—		—		15	2
Wealdstone (loan)	2024–25	National League	14	1	1	0	—		4 (Note: One appearance in FA Trophy, three appearances and two goals National League Cup)	2	19	3
Sutton United	2024–25	National League	11	0	—		—		—		11	0
Sutton United	2025–26	National League	0	0	0	0	—		1 (Note: Appearance in National League Cup)	0	1	0
Sutton United	Total		11	0	0	0	—		1	0	12	0
Hornchurch (loan)	2025–26	National League South	11	0	1	0	—		2	0	14	0
Hornchurch	2025–26	National League South	12	5	—		—		2 (Note: Appearances in FA Trophy)	2	14	7
Career total			75	9	2	0	0	0	10	4	87	13

== Honours ==
Hornchurch

- National League South play-offs: 2026
