= Adama Traoré (footballer, born 1989) =

Malian footballer

Personal information
- Full name: Adama Traoré
- Date of birth: 17 January 1989 (age 37)
- Place of birth: Bamako, Mali
- Height: 1.85 m (6 ft 1 in)
- Position: Forward

Youth career
- 2002–2006: Centre Salif Keita

Senior career*
Years	Team	Apps	(Gls)
2006–2008	Centre Salif Keita		
2008–2009	Paris Saint-Germain B	1	(0)
2009–2010	Saint-Dié		
2010	Calais		
2011–2012	Yzeure	11	(1)
2012–2014	FC Lunéville		
2014–2015	Al-Markhiya		
2015–2016	Birkirkara		
2016	Mesaimeer	8	(1)

International career
2008–2009	Mali U20	7	(3)
- * Club domestic league appearances and goals

Adama Traoré (born 17 January 1989) is a Malian professional footballer who plays as a forward.

== Club career ==
Born in Bamako, Traoré began his career with the Centre Salif Keita before signing for Paris Saint-Germain. He signed for Saint-Dié in 2009. In January 2010, Traoré joined Calais.

== International career ==
Traoré was part of the under-20 team that represented Mali at the 2009 African Youth Championship in Rwanda.
