= 2025 Bohemian F.C. season =

Irish football club season

Bohemian F.C.
2025 season
- Manager: Alan Reynolds
- Stadium: Dalymount Park, Phibsborough, Dublin 7
- Premier Division: 4th
- FAI Cup: Third Round
- Leinster Senior Cup: Semi Final
- Top goalscorer: League: James Clarke (8 goals); All: Ross Tierney, Colm Whelan (9 goals)
- Highest home attendance: 33,208 vs Shamrock Rovers 16 February, Premier Division
- Lowest home attendance: 4,100 vs Cork City 22 August, Premier Division
- Biggest win: 0–7 vs Killester Donnycarney (A) 18 July, FAI Cup
- Biggest defeat: 3–0 vs St Patrick's Athletic (A) 14 March, Premier Division
Home colours	Away colours	Third colours

The 2025 League of Ireland Premier Division season was Bohemian Football Club's 135th year in their history and their 41st consecutive season in the League of Ireland Premier Division since it became the top tier of Irish football. Bohemians participated in the FAI Cup the Leinster Senior Cup.

Bohemians defeated arch rivals Shamrock Rovers in their 2025 League of Ireland Premier Division season opener in the Aviva Stadium in front of a record setting 33,000 fans. This game was billed as a Showcase of the Best of League of Ireland. They would go on finish 4th in the Premier Division, clinching European football for the first since 2021.

== Club ==
=== Kits ===
Supplier: O'Neills | Sponsor: Des Kelly Interiors

==== Home ====
Bohemians home shirt for 2025, is designed by in-house club designers and produced in Ireland by kit partner O’Neill's. The jersey commemorates the club's 135th anniversary. The 2025 jersey retains the club's famous red and black stripes but with the incision of gold trimming to mark the anniversary, sewn on gold sleeve stripes, as well as 135 years embroidery under the crest and 135 years text and knotwork design on the rear neck. Inside the neck tape has the words 135 Blian. Main club partner is once again Des Kelly. The jersey features a woven crossover v-neck collar of red, black and gold in a new design which is mirrored on the sleeve ends.

==== Away ====
Supplier: O'Neills | Sponsor: Guinness

Bohs 2025 away shirt celebrates two of the city's most famous institutions. It features a Guinness logo from the 1980s, alongside an O’Neill's logo from the same era, on a cream body with thin red pinstripes throughout, as well as a black and cream collar and sleeve trims. It also has an embroidered hem tag of the Ha’penny Bridge with Irish and English inscription.

Proceeds from the shirt will go towards the development and running of the club with 10% of the profits going to ‘Bohs in the Community’ and its Pride Committee to help build upon the club's continuing work in tackling homophobia, biphobia and transphobia in football across the island.

==== Third ====
Supplier: O'Neills | Sponsor: Fontaines D.C.

Bohemians 2025 alternate third kit was created by Fontaines D.C. band member Carlos O'Connell in conjunction with in-house Bohemian FC designers. A quote from their award-winning 2024 album Romance – I thought it was love – is printed around the neck while the Romance colour scheme flows through the body and sleeve trim. The Fontaines D.C. logo is emblazoned across the front of the strip. An embroidered hem tag features a Palestinian flag with the words Saoirse don Phalaistín (Irish for 'Free Palestine', pronounced [ˈsˠiːɾˠʃə d̪ˠənˠ ˈfˠalˠəʃtʲiːnʲ]).

30% of profits from the shirt go directly to Medical Aid for Palestinians. The release of the jersey was picked up by multiple media outlets.

==== Cup ====
Supplier: O'Neills | Sponsor: Oasis

Bohemian Football Club, in partnership with Oasis, announced the release of the club's 2025 FAI Cup jersey. Bohs unveiled a special FAI Cup shirt paying homage to one of the greatest bands of all time. Featuring the iconic Oasis logo in the traditional blue tones of Dublin City, with a 90s styling and sublimated chevron patterns, as well as a white and blue collar and sleeve trims, it is manufactured by O’Neill's Sportswear Ireland and designed in-house by Bohemian FC in collaboration with Oasis.

All profits from the shirt have been split between Bohemian FC and two charities. 50% of the profits from the shirt would be used by Bohemian Football Club to help build on the club's work across its football and community activities. The other half of the profits have been split 25% to Music Generation Ireland, to allow disadvantaged kids across Ireland access music and 25% to Irish Community Care Manchester (ICCM), for their work with the Irish community in the city. No proceeds went to Oasis for their partnership and support of this project.

=== Management team ===
Position	Name
Manager	(Republic of Ireland) Alan Reynolds
Assistant manager	(Republic of Ireland) Stephen O'Donnell
Technical assistant	(Republic of Ireland) Derek Pender
Goalkeeping coach	(Republic of Ireland) Seán Fogarty
Equipment manager	(Republic of Ireland) Colin O Connor
Assistant equipment manager	(Republic of Ireland) Aaron Fitzsimons
Analyst	(Republic of Ireland) Alan Moore
Lead physiotherapist	(England) Danny Miller
Doctor	(Republic of Ireland) Fiona Dennehy
Strength & Conditioning	(Republic of Ireland) Stephen Lawlor
Director of football	(Republic of Ireland) Pat Fenlon

== Transfers ==
=== Transfers in ===
Date	Pos.	Player	From	Fee	Source
January 2025	DF	(Republic of Ireland) Divin Isamala	(Republic of Ireland) Wexford	Loan return	
January 2025	ST	(Republic of Ireland) Colm Whelan	(Republic of Ireland) Derry City	Free	
January 2025	MF	(Republic of Ireland) Niall Morahan	(Republic of Ireland) Sligo Rovers	Free	
January 2025	MF	(Republic of Ireland) John Mountney	(Republic of Ireland) Dundalk	Free	
January 2025	DF	(England) Kian Best	(England) Preston North End	Loan	
February 2025	MF	(England) Connor Parsons	(England) Dagenham & Redbridge	Undisclosed	
February 2025	DF	(England) Alex Lacey	(England) Hartlepool	Free	
February 2025	ST	(France) Lys Mousset	(Germany) VfL Bochum	Free	
February 2025	DF	(Republic of Ireland) Seán Grehan	(England) Crystal Palace	Loan	
July 2025	DF	(Republic of Ireland) Cian Byrne	(Republic of Ireland) Galway United	Loan return	
July 2025	ST	(England) Douglas James-Taylor	(England) Walsall	Free	
August 2025	DF	(Malawi) Jubril Okedina	(England) Cambridge United	Free	

=== Transfers out ===
Date	Pos.	Player	To	Fee	Source
January 2025	MF	(Republic of Ireland) Danny Grant	(Republic of Ireland) Shamrock Rovers	Released	
January 2025	DF	(Republic of Ireland) Paddy Kirk	Without club	Released	
January 2025	FW	(England) James Akintunde	(Finland) FC Haka	Released	
January 2025	MF	(Scotland) Declan McDaid	(Republic of Ireland) Athlone Town	Released	
January 2025	MF	(Republic of Ireland) Brian McManus	(Republic of Ireland) UCD	Released	
January 2025	MF	(Estonia) Martin Miller	(Estonia) Paide Linnameeskond	Released	
January 2025	DF	(England) Jevon Mills	(England) Hull City	Loan end	
January 2025	FW	(Poland) Filip Piszczek	(Italy) Ischia	Released	
January 2025	FW	(Republic of Ireland) Chris Lotefa	(Republic of Ireland) Lucan United	Released	
January 2025	FW	(Republic of Ireland) Nickson Okosun	(England) Watford	Undisclosed fee	
January 2025	DF	(Republic of Ireland) Jake Carroll	Retired	N/A	
January 2025	ST	(New Zealand) Alex Greive	(United States) San Antonio FC	Released	
January 2025	MF	(Republic of Ireland) Billy Gilmore	(Republic of Ireland) Athlone Town	Loan	
January 2025	DF	(Republic of Ireland) Divin Isamala	(Northern Ireland) Portadown	Loan	
February 2025	DF	(Republic of Ireland) Cian Byrne	(Republic of Ireland) Galway United	Loan	
June 2025	DF	(England) Kian Best	(England) Preston North End	Loan end	
June 2025	DF	(Republic of Ireland) Seán Grehan	(England) Crystal Palace	Loan end	
June 2025	DF	(Republic of Ireland) Divin Isamala	(Northern Ireland) Portadown	Undisclosed fee	
June 2025	MF	(Republic of Ireland) James McManus	(Republic of Ireland) Sligo Rovers	Loan	
July 2025	FW	(France) Lys Mousset	Without club	Mutual consent	
July 2025	MF	(Republic of Ireland) Sean Moore	(Republic of Ireland) Longford Town	Free	
August 2025	DF	(Republic of Ireland) Declan Osagie	(Republic of Ireland) UCD	Loan	
August 2025	DF	(Scotland) Liam Smith	(Scotland) St Johnstone	Mutual consent	

== First Team Squad ==
No.	Player	Nat.	Pos.	Date of birth (age)	Since	Ends	Last club
Goalkeepers
1	James Talbot	(Republic of Ireland)	GK	24 April 1997 (age 29)	2019	2025	(England) Sunderland
30	Kacper Chorążka	(Poland)	GK	18 April 1999 (age 27)	2024	2026	(Cyprus) ASIL Lysi
Defenders
2	Jubril Okedina	(Malawi)	CB	26 October 2000 (age 26)	2025	2026	(England) Cambridge United
5	Rob Cornwall	(Republic of Ireland)	CB	16 October 1994 (age 32)	2024	2025	(United States) Northern Colorado Hailstorm
20	Leigh Kavanagh	(Republic of Ireland)	CB	27 December 2003 (age 22)	2024	2027	(England) Brighton & Hove Albion
21	Alex Lacey	(England)	LB	31 May 1993 (age 33)	2025	2026	(England) Hartlepool United
22	John Mountney	(Republic of Ireland)	RB	22 February 1993 (age 33)	2025	2026	(Republic of Ireland) Dundalk
24	Cian Byrne	(Republic of Ireland)	CB	31 January 2003 (age 23)	2022	2025	(Republic of Ireland) Bohemians U20
-	Liam Smith	(Scotland)	RB	10 April 1998 (age 28)	2024	2025	(England) Cheltenham Town
-	Kian Best	(England)	LB	27 July 2005 (age 21)	2025	2025	(England) Preston North End
-	Seán Grehan	(Republic of Ireland)	CB	8 January 2004 (age 22)	2025	2025	(England) Crystal Palace
Midfielders
4	Niall Morahan	(Republic of Ireland)	CM	30 May 2000 (age 26)	2025	2026	(Republic of Ireland) Sligo Rovers
6	Jordan Flores	(England)	CM	4 October 1995 (age 31)	2022	2027	(England) Northampton Town
7	Connor Parsons	(England)	AM	26 October 2000 (age 26)	2025	2026	(England) Dagenham & Redbridge
8	Dayle Rooney	(Republic of Ireland)	LM	24 February 1998 (age 28)	2024	2027	(Republic of Ireland) Drogheda United
10	Dawson Devoy	(Republic of Ireland)	CM	20 November 2001 (age 24)	2024	2026	(England) MK Dons
15	James Clarke	(Republic of Ireland)	AM	28 January 2001 (age 25)	2022	2025	(Republic of Ireland) Drogheda United
16	Keith Buckley (C)	(Republic of Ireland)	CM	17 June 1992 (age 34)	2022	2025	(Australia) Blacktown Spartans
17	Adam McDonnell	(Republic of Ireland)	CM	14 May 1997 (age 29)	2023	2025	(Republic of Ireland) Sligo Rovers
19	Rhys Brennan	(Republic of Ireland)	RM	15 June 2006 (age 20)	2025	2025	(Republic of Ireland) Bohemians U20
23	Archie Meekison	(Scotland)	RM	4 May 2002 (age 24)	2024	2025	(Scotland) Dundee United
26	Ross Tierney	(Republic of Ireland)	CM	6 March 2001 (age 25)	2024	2025	(Scotland) Motherwell
32	Markuss Strods	(Latvia)	AM	5 October 2006 (age 20)	2024	2027	(Republic of Ireland) Bohemians U20
-	James McManus	(Republic of Ireland)	CM	16 March 2005 (age 21)	2022	2027	(Republic of Ireland) Bohemians U20
Forwards
9	Colm Whelan	(Republic of Ireland)	CF	29 June 2000 (age 26)	2025	2026	(Republic of Ireland) Derry City
18	Douglas James-Taylor	(England)	CF	18 November 2001 (age 25)	2025	2027	(England) Walsall F.C.
-	Lys Mousset	(France)	CF	8 February 1996 (age 30)	2025	2025	(Germany) VfL Bochum

Players in italics departed during the season

== Friendlies ==
=== Pre-season ===
Win Draw Loss

10 January	Bohemians	0-0	Waterford	Coolock
13:00		Report		Stadium: Oscar Traynor Centre; Attendance: Behind closed doors Referee: Daniel Murphy

17 January	Cork City	2-4	Bohemians	Cork
14:00	Dijksteel 31'; Fitzpatrick 68'	Report	Mountney 6'; Devoy 38'; Clarke 57'; Byrne 74'	Stadium: Bishopstown Stadium; Attendance: 150 (est); Referee: Kevin O’Sullivan

28 January	Bohemians	4-2	Drogheda United	Coolock
13:00	McDonnell; Mousset; Lacey	Report	Bawa; Thomas	Stadium: Oscar Traynor Centre; Attendance: Behind closed doors Referee: David Gallagher

1 February	Waterford	1-2	Bohemians	Waterford
14:00	Lonergan 90' (pen.)	Report	Rooney 38' (pen.); Mousset 45'	Stadium: Waterford RSC; Attendance: Behind closed doors Referee: Gavin Keyes

6 February	Bohemians	5-0	Longford Town	Abbotstown
19:00	Meekison 18' 79'; Tierney 40'; Rooney 75' 80'	Report		Stadium: National Sports Campus; Attendance: Behind closed doors Referee: Rob Harvey

7 February	Athlone Town	0-5	Bohemians	Athlone
19:30		Report	Cornwall 40'; Clarke 45'; Brennan 47'; Devoy 56' (pen.); Mousset 68'	Stadium: Athlone Town Stadium; Attendance: 150 (est); Referee: David Dunne

=== Mid-season ===
7 July	Bohemians	3-1	St. Mochta’s	Abbotstown
19:00	Whelan 20' 23' 54'		Brady 30'	Stadium: National Sports Campus; Attendance: Behind closed doors Referee: Alan Patchell

11 October	Bohemians (Republic of Ireland)	3-2	(Germany) Schalke 04	Phibsborough
15:00	Devoy 20'; McDonnell 64'; Mountney 90'		Bachmann 51' 81'	Stadium: Dalymount Park; Attendance: 4200; Referee: Rob Harvey

== Competitions ==
=== League of Ireland ===
==== League table ====
Pos	Team	Pld	W	D	L	GF	GA	GD	Pts	Qualification or relegation
1	Shamrock Rovers (C)	36	19	9	8	56	33	+23	66	Qualification for Champions League first qualifying round
2	Derry City	36	18	9	9	52	39	+13	63	Qualification for Europa League first qualifying round (Note: Shamrock Rovers won the 2025 FAI Cup, meaning the Europa League berth went to the second place team Derry City. The two Conference League berths went to the third and fourth place teams, Shelbourne and Bohemians respectively.)
3	Shelbourne	36	15	14	7	48	37	+11	59	Qualification for Conference League second qualifying round
4	Bohemians	36	16	6	14	48	39	+9	54	Qualification for Conference League first qualifying round
5	St Patrick's Athletic	36	13	13	10	42	32	+10	52	
6	Drogheda United	36	12	15	9	38	38	0	51	
7	Sligo Rovers	36	11	8	17	42	54	−12	41	
8	Galway United	36	9	12	15	37	44	−7	39	
9	Waterford (O)	36	11	6	19	41	60	−19	39	Qualification for promotion/relegation play-off
10	Cork City (R)	36	4	12	20	33	61	−28	24	Relegation to League of Ireland First Division

Source: SSE Airtricity League, Soccerway
Rules for classification: 1) Points; 2) Goal difference; 3) Goals scored.
(C) Champions; (O) Play-off winners; (R) Relegated

==== League Matches ====
Win Draw Loss

16 February 1	Bohemians	1-0	Shamrock Rovers	Dublin
14:00	Tierney 25'	Report		Stadium: Aviva Stadium; Attendance: 33,203; Referee: Rob Hennessy
Note: Played at Aviva Stadium for showcase match and broadcast live on Virgin Media Two.

21 February 2	Derry City	1-0	Bohemians	Derry
19:45	Duffy 10'	Report		Stadium: Ryan McBride Brandywell Stadium; Attendance: 3,264; Referee: Marc Lynch

28 February 3	Cork City	2-1	Bohemians	Cork
19:45	Maguire 35'; Keating 83'	Report	Buckley 21'; Cornwall (red card) 90+5'	Stadium: Turners Cross; Attendance: 5,034; Referee: Declan Toland

3 March 4	Bohemians	0-1	Drogheda United	Phibsborough
19:45		Report	Oluwa 17'	Stadium: Dalymount Park; Attendance: 4,393; Referee: Mark Houlihan

7 March 5	Waterford	0-3	Bohemians	Waterford
19:45		Report	Whelan 15' 34' (pen.) 42' (pen.)	Stadium: Waterford Regional Sports Centre; Attendance: 3,218; Referee: Rob Harvey

14 March 6	St Patrick's Athletic	3-0	Bohemians	Inchicore
19:45	Forrester 17'; Melia 83'; McClelland 90'	Report		Stadium: Richmond Park; Attendance: 5,338; Referee: Neil Doyle
Note: Broadcast live on Virgin Media Two.

28 March 7	Bohemians	0-2	Galway United	Phibsborough
19:45		Report	Dyer 19' 66'	Stadium: Dalymount Park; Attendance: 4,328; Referee: Damien MacGraith

4 April 8	Bohemians	4-2	Sligo Rovers	Phibsborough
19:45	Whelan 3'; Tierney 5' 74'; Devoy	Report	Lomboto 23'; Elding 29'	Stadium: Dalymount Park; Attendance: 4,289; Referee: David Dunne

11 April 9	Shelbourne	1-0	Bohemians	Drumcondra
19:45	Odubeko 79'	Report		Stadium: Tolka Park; Attendance: 5,513; Referee: Kevin O'Sullivan
Note: Broadcast live on Virgin Media Two

18 April 10	Bohemians	1-0	Cork City	Phibsborough
19:45	McManus 85'	Report		Stadium: Dalymount Park; Attendance: 4,101; Referee: Paul McLaughlin

21 April 11	Shamrock Rovers	2-3	Bohemians	Tallaght
14:00	Honohan 39'; Noonan 41'	Report	Devoy 70'; Tierney 81'; Brennan 90+6'	Stadium: Tallaght Stadium; Attendance: 8,471; Referee: Rob Harvey
Note: Broadcast live on Virgin Media Two

25 April 12	Bohemians	2-1	St Patrick's Athletic	Phibsborough
19:45	Cornwall 90'; Grehan 90+7'	Report	Forrester 23' (pen.); Breslin (yellow card) 90+2' (yellow-red card)	Stadium: Dalymount Park; Attendance: 4,388; Referee: Damien MacGraith

2 May 13	Bohemians	1-2	Waterford	Phibsborough
19:45	Clarke 49'	Report	Olayinka 45+3'; Lonergan 59'	Stadium: Dalymount Park; Attendance: 4,222; Referee: Gavin Colfer

5 May 14	Galway United	1-2	Bohemians	Galway
17:00	Dyer 44'	Report	Grehan 60' 90+7'	Stadium: Eamonn Deacy Park; Attendance: 3,316; Referee: Kevin O'Sullivan

10 May 15	Sligo Rovers	0-1	Bohemians	Sligo
19:45		Report	Mousset 88'	Stadium: The Showgrounds; Attendance: 2,056; Referee: Mark Houlihan

16 May 16	Bohemians	1-0	Shelbourne	Phibsborough
19:45	Rooney 36' (pen.)	Report	Coyle (red card) 35'; Coote (red card) 84'	Stadium: Dalymount Park; Attendance: 4,392; Referee: Rob Harvey
Note: Broadcast live on Virgin Media Two.

23 May 17	Drogheda United	1-0	Bohemians	Drogheda
19:45	James-Taylor 60' (pen.)	Report		Stadium: Sullivan and Lambe Park; Attendance: 2,559; Referee: Declan Toland

30 May 18	Bohemians	1-0	Derry City	Phibsborough
19:45	Rooney 2' (pen.)	Report	Benson (red card) 83'	Stadium: Dalymount Park; Attendance: 4,111; Referee: Rob Hennessy
Note: Broadcast live on Virgin Media Two

13 June 19	Cork City	0-2	Bohemians	Cork
19:45		Report	Meekison 10'; Rooney 43'	Stadium: Turners Cross; Attendance: 3,215; Referee: Paul Norton

20 June 20	Waterford	2-1	Bohemians	Waterford
19:45	Amond 45' (pen.); Noonan 45+2'	Report	Devoy 72'	Stadium: Waterford Regional Sports Centre; Attendance: 2,966; Referee: Marc Lynch

23 June 21	Bohemians	2-0	Shamrock Rovers	Phibsborough
19:45	Rooney 2'; Clarke 39'	Report		Stadium: Dalymount Park; Attendance: 4,421; Referee: Kevin O'Sullivan
Note: Broadcast live on Virgin Media Two.

27 June 22	Bohemians	1-1	Sligo Rovers	Phibsborough
19:45	Clarke 90+5'	Report	Elding 28'	Stadium: Dalymount Park; Attendance: 4,103; Referee: Declan Toland

4 July 23	St Patrick's Athletic	0-0	Bohemians	Inchicore
19:45		Report		Stadium: Richmond Park; Attendance: 4,919; Referee: Rob Hennessy
Note: Broadcast live on Virgin Media Two

11 July 24	Bohemians	3-0	Galway United	Phibsborough
19:45	James-Taylor 47'; Clarke 61' 72'	Report		Stadium: Dalymount Park; Attendance: 4,151; Referee: Rob Harvey

25 July 25	Derry City	1-1	Bohemians	Derry
19:45	Akinyemi 45+4'	Report	Tierney 52'	Stadium: Ryan McBride Brandywell Stadium; Attendance: 4,193; Referee: Damien MacGraith

1 August 26	Bohemians	0-1	Drogheda United	Phibsborough
19:45		Report	Thomas 86'	Stadium: Dalymount Park; Attendance: 4,372; Referee: Paul Norton
Note: Broadcast live on Virgin Media Two

9 August 27	Shelbourne	2-2	Bohemians	Drumcondra
17:00	Kelly 3'; Martin 90'	Report	Parsons 10'; Devoy 77'	Stadium: Tolka Park; Attendance: 5,474; Referee: Rob Hennessy

22 August 28	Bohemians	3-0	Cork City	Phibsborough
19:45	James-Taylor 24' 85'; Devoy 90+4'	Report		Stadium: Dalymount Park; Attendance: 4,100; Referee: Rob Harvey

30 August 29	Sligo Rovers	0-0	Bohemians	Sligo
19:45		Report		Stadium: The Showgrounds; Attendance: 2,754; Referee: Paul Norton

12 September 30	Bohemians	3-4	Derry City	Phibsborough
19:45	James-Taylor 9' (pen.) 71'; Flores 66'	Report	Duffy 20'; O'Reilly 45+1' 67'; Akinyemi 74'; Boyce (red card) 77'	Stadium: Dalymount Park; Attendance: 4,006; Referee: Rob Hennessy

19 September 31	Bohemians	2-1	Waterford	Phibsborough
19:45	Morahan 30'; Meekison 66'	Report	Amond 45+3'	Stadium: Dalymount Park; Attendance: 4,116; Referee: Declan Toland

26 September 32	Shamrock Rovers	2-1	Bohemians	Tallaght
20:00	Burke 12'; Mandroiu 51'	Report	Clarke 40'	Stadium: Tallaght Stadium; Attendance: 9,522; Referee: Paul Norton
Note: Broadcast live on Virgin Media Two.

17 October 2025 33	Galway United	2–0	Bohemians	Galway
19:45	Hurley 59' (pen.); Hickey 36'	Report		Stadium: Eamonn Deacy Park; Attendance: 2,622; Referee: Rob Harvey

20 October 2025 34	Bohemians	0–0	St Patrick's Athletic	Phibsborough
19:45		Report		Stadium: Dalymount Park; Attendance: 4,391; Referee: Paul McLaughlin
Note: Fixture moved due to St Pats competing in FAI Cup

26 October 2025 35	Bohemians	2-3	Shelbourne	Phibsborough
16:00	Tierney 17'; Flores 22'	Report	Martin 35'; Wood 87'; McInroy 97'	Stadium: Dalymount Park; Attendance: 4300; Referee: Rob Hennessy

1 November 36	Drogheda United	1-4	Bohemians	Drogheda
16:30	Keeley 33'	Report	Clarke 20' 37'; Whelan 90'; Tierney 90+2'	Stadium: Sullivan and Lambe Park; Attendance: 2596; Referee: Paul Norton
Note: Broadcast live on Virgin Media Two.

==== Results by match day ====
Round	1	2	3	4	5	6	7	8	9	10	11	12	13	14	15	16	17	18	19	20	21	22	23	24	25	26	27	28	29	30	31	32	33	34	35	36
Ground	H	A	A	H	A	A	H	H	A	H	A	H	H	A	A	H	A	H	A	A	H	H	A	H	A	H	A	H	A	H	H	A	A	H	H	W
Result	W	L	L	L	W	L	L	W	L	W	W	W	L	W	W	W	L	W	W	L	W	D	D	W	D	L	D	W	D	L	W	L	L	D	L	W
Position	3	5	7	7	6	9	9	7	7	7	7	6	7	5	4	3	4	3	2	3	2	3	3	2	2	2	2	2	2	3	2	3	4	4	5	4

Source: 2025 League of Ireland Premier Division
A = Away; H = Home; W = Win; D = Draw; L = Loss

=== FAI Cup ===
Win Draw Loss

18 July 2nd Round	Killester Donnycarney	0-7	Bohemians	Phibsborough
19:45		Report	Strods 8' 19'; Whelan 18' (pen.) 37' 63' (pen.) 79' Brennan 67'	Stadium: Dalymount Park; Attendance: 3,484; Referee: Daniel Murphy
Note: Game moved to Dalymount Park.

15 August 3rd Round	Bohemians	0–1	Sligo Rovers	Phibsborough
19:45		Report	Elding 53'	Stadium: Dalymount Park; Attendance: 4,246; Referee: Kevin O'Sullivan

=== Leinster Senior Cup ===
==== Group D ====
Team	Pld	W	D	L	GF	GA	GD	Pts
Bohemians	3	2	0	1	10	5	5	6
North End United	3	2	0	1	5	4	1	6
UCD	3	2	0	1	5	6	–1	6
Wexford	3	0	0	3	4	9	–5	0

Win Draw Loss

21 January Group Stage	UCD	1–4	Bohemians	Belfield
19:00	Clancy 13'	Report	Smith 29'; Brennan 67'; Tierney 89' 90+1'	Stadium: UCD Bowl; Attendance: 250; Referee: Daniel Murphy

26 January Group Stage	North End United	1-0	Bohemians	Wexford
14:00	Rhodes 6'			Stadium: Wexford CBS; Attendance: 150; Referee: David Dunne

3 February Group Stage	Wexford	3-6	Bohemians	Coolock
15:00	Rowe 21'; Osagie 27' (o.g.); D Levingston 49'	Report	Clarke 2'; Ritchie 31'; Tracey 37'; Strods 43' 78'; Smith 81'	Stadium: Oscar Traynor Centre; Attendance: 120; Referee: John Sconnie Walsh
Note: Game moved to Oscar Traynor Centre on short notice

19 April 1/4 Final	Bohemians	2-0	Usher Celtic	Coolock
14:00	Strods 38'; Mohan 59'			Stadium: Oscar Traynor Centre; Attendance: 100; Referee: Daryl Carolyn

Semi Final	Dundalk	w/o¹	Bohemians	Dundalk
				Stadium: Oriel Park
Note: ¹Dundalk were awarded a walkover as Bohemians could not agree a date for the fixture to take place

=== Overview ===
Competition	Record							
Competition	P	W	D	L	GF	GA	GD	Win %
Premier Division	36	16	6	14	48	39	+9	44.44
FAI Cup	2	1	0	1	7	1	+6	50.00
Leinster Senior Cup	4	3	0	1	12	5	+7	75.00
Total	42	20	6	16	67	43	+24	47.62

Source: Competitions

== Statistics ==
=== Appearances and goals ===
Brackets denotes appearances made as a substitute

No.	Pos.	Player	League		FAI Cup		LSC		Total	
No.	Pos.	Player	Apps	Goals	Apps	Goals	Apps	Goals	Apps	Goals
1	GK	(Republic of Ireland) James Talbot	7	0	2	0	1	0	10	0
2	DF	(Malawi) Jubril Okedina	3	0	0	0	0	0	3	0
4	MF	(Republic of Ireland) Niall Morahan	35(3)	1	2(1)	0	1	0	37(4)	1
5	DF	(Republic of Ireland) Rob Cornwall	24(5)	1	0	0	0	0	24(5)	1
6	MF	(Republic of Ireland) Jordan Flores	33	2	1	0	0	0	34	2
7	MF	(England) Connor Parsons	22(10)	1	2	0	0	0	24(10)	1
8	MF	(Republic of Ireland) Dayle Rooney	36(4)	4	1	0	1	0	38(4)	4
9	FW	(Republic of Ireland) Colm Whelan	33(19)	5	2(1)	4	0	0	35(20)	9
10	MF	(Republic of Ireland) Dawson Devoy	34	5	1	0	1	0	36	5
12	MF	(Republic of Ireland) Hugh Smith	1(1)	0	0	0	2	1	3(1)	1
14	MF	(Republic of Ireland) Ryan Ritchie	0	0	0	0	3	1	3	1
15	MF	(Republic of Ireland) James Clarke	32(7)	8	0	0	1	0	33(7)	8
16	MF	(Republic of Ireland) Keith Buckley	28(24)	1	2	0	0	0	30(24)	1
17	MF	(Republic of Ireland) Adam McDonnell	31(7)	0	2(1)	0	1(1)	0	34(9)	0
18	FW	(England) Douglas James-Taylor	10(2)	5	1	0	0	0	11(2)	5
19	MF	(Republic of Ireland) Rhys Brennan	16(12)	1	2(1)	1	1	1	19(13)	3
20	DF	(Republic of Ireland) Leigh Kavanagh	22(6)	0	2	0	1	0	25(6)	0
21	DF	(England) Alex Lacey	1	0	0	0	0	0	1	0
22	DF	(Republic of Ireland) John Mountney	19(8)	0	1	0	1	0	21(8)	0
23	MF	(Scotland) Archie Meekison	18(11)	2	0	0	1(1)	0	19(13)	2
24	DF	(Republic of Ireland) Cian Byrne	13(2)	0	2	0	1	0	16(2)	0
25	GK	(Republic of Ireland) Rian Hogan	0	0	0	0	3	0	3	0
26	MF	(Republic of Ireland) Ross Tierney	35(2)	7	1	0	1	2	36(2)	9
29	FW	(Republic of Ireland) Josh Harpur	0	0	1(1)	0	0	0	1(1)	0
30	GK	(Poland) Kacper Chorążka	29	0	0	0	0	0	29	0
32	MF	(Latvia) Markuss Strods	5(5)	0	1	2	4	3	10(5)	5
33	MF	(Republic of Ireland) Christopher Conlan	0	0	1(1)	0	0	0	1(1)	0
40	GK	(Republic of Ireland) Joe Collins	0	0	0	0	0	0	0	0
-	DF	(Republic of Ireland) Jake Hough	0	0	0	0	4(1)	0	4(1)	0
-	DF	(Republic of Ireland) Cameron Hamilton	0	0	0	0	3	0	3	0
-	MF	(Republic of Ireland) Leo Healy	0	0	0	0	3(1)	0	3(1)	0
-	MF	(Republic of Ireland) Shane Tracey	0	0	0	0	2	1	2	1
-	MF	(Republic of Ireland) Seb Mohan	0	0	0	0	3(1)	0	3(1)	0
-	FW	(Republic of Ireland) Tom Clarke	0	0	0	0	3(1)	1	3(1)	1
-	MF	(Republic of Ireland) Senan Boyle	0	0	0	0	3(2)	0	3(2)	0
-	DF	(Republic of Ireland) Conor Errity	0	0	0	0	2(2)	0	2(2)	0
-	DF	(Republic of Ireland) Luke Rossi	0	0	0	0	1(1)	0	1(1)	0
-	MF	(Republic of Ireland) Josh Delves	0	0	0	0	1(1)	0	1(1)	0
-	MF	(Republic of Ireland) Oskar Skoubo Keely	0	0	0	0	1(1)	0	1(1)	0
-	DF	(Republic of Ireland) TJ Olusanya	0	0	0	0	1	0	1	0
-	MF	(Republic of Ireland) Bobbie Malone	0	0	0	0	1(1)	0	1(1)	0
-	MF	(Republic of Ireland) Charlie Mc Connell	0	0	0	0	1(1)	0	1(1)	0
-	MF	(Republic of Ireland) Curtis Egan	0	0	0	0	1(1)	0	1(1)	0
Players left club during season
2	DF	(Scotland) Liam Smith	14(5)	0	2(1)	0	1	1	17(6)	1
3	DF	(England) Kian Best	1	0	0	0	0	0	1	0
11	FW	(France) Lys Mousset	9(6)	1	0	0	0	0	9(6)	1
13	DF	(Republic of Ireland) Divin Isamala	0	0	0	0	0	0	0	0
14	DF	(Republic of Ireland) James McManus	12(6)	1	0	0	1(1)	0	13(7)	1
27	MF	(Republic of Ireland) Billy Gilmore	0	0	0	0	0	0	0	0
28	MF	(Republic of Ireland) Seán Moore	0	0	0	0	2	0	2	0
29	DF	(Republic of Ireland) Seán Grehan	18(1)	3	0	0	0	0	18(1)	3
31	DF	(Republic of Ireland) Declan Osagie	0	0	1(1)	0	4(1)	0	5(2)	0

=== Top Scorers ===
No.	Player	League	FAI Cup	LSC	Total
26	(Republic of Ireland) Ross Tierney	7	0	2	9
9	(Republic of Ireland) Colm Whelan	5	4	0	9
15	(Republic of Ireland) James Clarke	8	0	0	8
10	(Republic of Ireland) Dawson Devoy	5	0	0	5
18	(England) Douglas James-Taylor	5	0	0	5
32	(Latvia) Markuss Strods	0	2	3	5
8	(Republic of Ireland) Dayle Rooney	4	0	0	4
19	(Republic of Ireland) Rhys Brennan	1	1	1	3
23	(Scotland) Archie Meekison	2	0	0	2
6	(England) Jordan Flores	2	0	0	2
16	(Republic of Ireland) Keith Buckley	1	0	0	1
5	(Republic of Ireland) Rob Cornwall	1	0	0	1
7	(England) Connor Parsons	1	0	0	1
4	(Republic of Ireland) Niall Morahan	1	0	0	1
12	(Republic of Ireland) Hugh Smith	0	0	1	1
14	(Republic of Ireland) Ryan Ritchie	0	0	1	1
-	(Republic of Ireland) Tom Clarke	0	0	1	1
-	(Republic of Ireland) Shane Tracey	0	0	1	1
-	(Republic of Ireland) Seb Mohan	0	0	1	1
Players left club during season
29	(Republic of Ireland) Seán Grehan	3	0	0	3
14	(Republic of Ireland) James McManus	1	0	0	1
11	(France) Lys Mousset	1	0	0	1
2	(Scotland) Liam Smith	0	0	1	1
Total		48	7	12	67

=== Hat tricks ===
No.	Player	Opposition	Goals	Result	Date	Competition
9	(Republic of Ireland) Colm Whelan	Waterford	3	0–3 (A)	7 March 2025	Premier Division
9	(Republic of Ireland) Colm Whelan	Killester Donnycarney	4	0–7 (A)	18 July 2025	FAI Cup

=== Clean Sheets ===
No.	Player	League	FAI Cup	LSC	Total
30	(Poland) Kacper Chorążka	11/29	0/0	0/0	11/29
1	(Republic of Ireland) James Talbot	2/7	1/2	0/1	3/10
25	(Republic of Ireland) Rian Hogan	0/0	0/0	1/3	1/3
40	(Republic of Ireland) Joe Collins	0/0	0/0	0/0	0/0
Total		13/36	1/2	1/4	15/42

=== Discipline ===
No.	Pos.	Player	League			FAI Cup			LSC			Total		
No.	Pos.	Player	Yellow card	(yellow card) (yellow-red card)	Red card	Yellow card	(yellow card) (yellow-red card)	Red card	Yellow card	(yellow card) (yellow-red card)	Red card	Yellow card	(yellow card) (yellow-red card)	Red card
1	GK	(Republic of Ireland) James Talbot	0	0	0	0	0	0	0	0	0	0	0	0
2	DF	(Malawi) Jubril Okedina	0	0	0	0	0	0	0	0	0	0	0	0
4	MF	(Republic of Ireland) Niall Morahan	6	0	0	1	0	0	0	0	0	7	0	0
5	DF	(Republic of Ireland) Rob Cornwall	4	1	0	0	0	0	0	0	0	4	1	0
6	MF	(Republic of Ireland) Jordan Flores	6	0	0	0	0	0	0	0	0	6	0	0
7	MF	(England) Connor Parsons	2	0	0	0	0	0	0	0	0	2	0	0
8	MF	(Republic of Ireland) Dayle Rooney	8	0	0	0	0	0	0	0	0	8	0	0
9	FW	(Republic of Ireland) Colm Whelan	3	0	0	0	0	0	0	0	0	3	0	0
10	MF	(Republic of Ireland) Dawson Devoy	11	0	0	0	0	0	0	0	0	11	0	0
12	MF	(Republic of Ireland) Hugh Smith	0	0	0	0	0	0	1	0	0	1	0	0
14	MF	(Republic of Ireland) Ryan Ritchie	0	0	0	0	0	0	2	0	0	2	0	0
15	MF	(Republic of Ireland) James Clarke	7	0	0	0	0	0	0	0	0	7	0	0
16	MF	(Republic of Ireland) Keith Buckley	2	0	0	0	0	0	0	0	0	2	0	0
17	MF	(Republic of Ireland) Adam McDonnell	8	0	0	0	0	0	0	0	0	8	0	0
18	FW	(England) Douglas James-Taylor	1	0	0	0	0	0	0	0	0	1	0	0
19	MF	(Republic of Ireland) Rhys Brennan	2	0	0	1	0	0	0	0	0	3	0	0
20	DF	(Republic of Ireland) Leigh Kavanagh	4	0	0	0	0	0	1	0	0	5	0	0
21	DF	(England) Alex Lacey	0	0	0	0	0	0	0	0	0	0	0	0
22	DF	(Republic of Ireland) John Mountney	2	0	0	0	0	0	0	0	0	2	0	0
23	MF	(Scotland) Archie Meekison	0	0	0	0	0	0	0	0	0	0	0	0
24	DF	(Republic of Ireland) Cian Byrne	3	0	0	1	0	0	0	0	0	4	0	0
25	GK	(Republic of Ireland) Rian Hogan	0	0	0	0	0	0	0	0	0	0	0	0
26	MF	(Republic of Ireland) Ross Tierney	5	0	0	0	0	0	0	0	0	5	0	0
29	FW	(Republic of Ireland) Josh Harpur	0	0	0	0	0	0	0	0	0	0	0	0
30	GK	(Poland) Kacper Chorążka	1	0	0	0	0	0	0	0	0	1	0	0
32	MF	(Latvia) Markuss Strods	0	0	0	0	0	0	2	0	0	2	0	0
33	MF	(Republic of Ireland) Christopher Conlan	0	0	0	0	0	0	0	0	0	0	0	0
40	GK	(Republic of Ireland) Joe Collins	0	0	0	0	0	0	0	0	0	0	0	0
-	DF	(Republic of Ireland) Jake Hough	0	0	0	0	0	0	0	0	0	0	0	0
-	DF	(Republic of Ireland) Cameron Hamilton	0	0	0	0	0	0	0	0	0	0	0	0
-	MF	(Republic of Ireland) Leo Healy	0	0	0	0	0	0	0	0	0	0	0	0
-	MF	(Republic of Ireland) Shane Tracey	0	0	0	0	0	0	0	0	0	0	0	0
-	MF	(Republic of Ireland) Seb Mohan	0	0	0	0	0	0	0	0	0	0	0	0
-	FW	(Republic of Ireland) Tom Clarke	0	0	0	0	0	0	0	0	0	0	0	0
-	MF	(Republic of Ireland) Senan Boyle	0	0	0	0	0	0	0	0	0	0	0	0
-	DF	(Republic of Ireland) Conor Errity	0	0	0	0	0	0	1	0	0	1	0	0
-	DF	(Republic of Ireland) Luke Rossi	0	0	0	0	0	0	0	0	0	0	0	0
-	DF	(Republic of Ireland) Josh Delves	0	0	0	0	0	0	0	0	0	0	0	0
-	DF	(Republic of Ireland) Oskar Skoubo Keely	0	0	0	0	0	0	0	0	0	0	0	0
-	DF	(Republic of Ireland) TJ Olusanya	0	0	0	0	0	0	1	0	0	1	0	0
-	MF	(Republic of Ireland) Bobbie Malone	0	0	0	0	0	0	0	0	0	0	0	0
-	MF	(Republic of Ireland) Charlie McConnell	0	0	0	0	0	0	0	0	0	0	0	0
-	MF	(Republic of Ireland) Curtis Egan	0	0	0	0	0	0	0	0	0	0	0	0
Players left club during season
2	DF	(Scotland) Liam Smith	2	0	0	0	0	0	0	0	0	2	0	0
3	DF	(England) Kian Best	0	0	0	0	0	0	0	0	0	0	0	0
11	FW	(France) Lys Mousset	1	0	0	0	0	0	0	0	0	1	0	0
13	DF	(Republic of Ireland) Divin Isamala	0	0	0	0	0	0	0	0	0	0	0	0
14	DF	(Republic of Ireland) James McManus	1	0	0	0	0	0	0	0	0	1	0	0
27	MF	(Republic of Ireland) Billy Gilmore	0	0	0	0	0	0	0	0	0	0	0	0
28	MF	(Republic of Ireland) Seán Moore	0	0	0	0	0	0	0	0	0	0	0	0
29	DF	(Republic of Ireland) Seán Grehan	3	0	0	0	0	0	0	0	0	3	0	0
31	DF	(Republic of Ireland) Declan Osagie	0	0	0	0	0	0	1	0	0	1	0	0
Total			80	1	0	2	0	0	9	0	0	92	1	0

=== Captains ===
No.	Pos.	Player	No. Games	Notes
10	MF	Dawson Devoy	31	Vice-captain
16	MF	Keith Buckley	6	Captain
31	DF	Declan Osagie	3	U20 Captain
6	MF	Jordan Flores	2	

== International call-ups ==
=== Republic of Ireland Under 21 National Team ===
Player	Fixture	Date	Location	Event
Seán Grehan	vs. Scotland	21 March 2025	Pinatar, Spain	Friendly
Seán Grehan	vs. Hungary	24 March 2025	Pinatar, Spain	Friendly
Seán Grehan	vs. Croatia	6 June 2025	Zagreb, Croatia	Friendly
Seán Grehan	vs. Qatar	10 June 2025	Zagreb, Croatia	Friendly

=== Latvia Under 21 National Team ===
Player	Fixture	Date	Location	Event
Markuss Strods	vs. Germany	9 August 2025	Rostock, Germany	2027 UEFA European Under-21 Championship qualification

=== Latvia Under 19 National Team ===
Player	Fixture	Date	Location	Event
Markuss Strods	vs. Turkey	18 February 2025	Istria, Croatia	Friendly
Markuss Strods	vs. Croatia	15 February 2025	Poreč, Croatia	Friendly
Markuss Strods	vs. Italy	19 March 2025	Crotone, Italy	2025 UEFA European Under-19 Championship qualification
Markuss Strods	vs. France	22 March 2025	Cosenza, Italy	2025 UEFA European Under-19 Championship qualification
Markuss Strods	vs. Spain	25 March 2025	Cosenza, Italy	2025 UEFA European Under-19 Championship qualification

=== Republic of Ireland Under 17 National Team ===
Player	Fixture	Date	Location	Event
Oskar Skoubo Kelly	vs. Hungary	12 February 2025	Pinatar, Spain	Friendly
Oskar Skoubo Kelly	vs. Finland	15 February 2025	Oliva, Spain	Friendly
Oskar Skoubo Kelly	vs. Belgium	19 March 2025	Gryfice, Poland	2025 UEFA European Under-17 Championship qualification
Oskar Skoubo Kelly	vs. Poland	22 March 2025	Koszalin, Poland	2025 UEFA European Under-17 Championship qualification
Oskar Skoubo Kelly	vs. Iceland	25 March 2025	Gryfice, Poland	2025 UEFA European Under-17 Championship qualification
Curtis Egan	vs. (Turkey) Turkiye	12 August 2025	Telki, Hungary	Friendly
Curtis Egan	vs. Iceland	14 August 2025	Telki, Hungary	Friendly
Curtis Egan	vs. Hungary	16 August 2025	Telki, Hungary	Friendly
Josh Harpur	vs. (Turkey) Turkiye	12 August 2025	Telki, Hungary	Friendly
Josh Harpur	vs. Iceland	14 August 2025	Telki, Hungary	Friendly
Josh Harpur	vs. Hungary	16 August 2025	Telki, Hungary	Friendly

=== Republic of Ireland Under 16 National Team ===
Player	Fixture	Date	Location	Event
Curtis Egan	vs. Poland	13 May 2025	Kętrzyn, Poland	UEFA Development Tournament
Curtis Egan	vs. Canada	15 May 2025	Biskupice,Poland	UEFA Development Tournament
Curtis Egan	vs. Egypt	18 May 2025	Kętrzyn, Poland	UEFA Development Tournament
Josh Harpur	vs. Poland	13 May 2025	Kętrzyn, Poland	UEFA Development Tournament
Josh Harpur	vs. Canada	15 May 2025	Biskupice,Poland	UEFA Development Tournament
Josh Harpur	vs. Egypt	18 May 2025	Kętrzyn, Poland	UEFA Development Tournament

== Awards ==
Player	Award
Dawson Devoy	Bohemian FC Player of the Year
