= James McManus (footballer) =

Irish footballer (born 2005)

Personal information
- Date of birth: 16 March 2005 (age 21)
- Place of birth: Dublin, Ireland
- Position: Midfielder

Team information
- Current team: Bohemians
- Number: 14

Youth career
- 2015-2020: St Kevin's Boys

Senior career*
Years	Team	Apps	(Gls)
2021–	Bohemians	61	(3)
2025	→ Sligo Rovers (loan)	13	(0)
2026	→ Sligo Rovers (loan)	27	(0)

International career
2019–2020	Republic of Ireland U15	10	(0)
2021–2022	Republic of Ireland U17	7	(0)
2021–2022	Republic of Ireland U18	3	(0)
2022–2023	Republic of Ireland U19	8	(0)
- * Club domestic league appearances and goals as of 11:22, 10 November 2026 (UTC)

James McManus (born 16 March 2005) is an Irish professional footballer who plays as a midfielder for League of Ireland Premier Division club Bohemians.

== Club career ==
=== Youth career ===
McManus played both association football and Gaelic football in his youth. He played Gaelic football with St. Oliver Plunketts up to U15 level and had trials with Dublin U15s before deciding to focus on association football. He initially joined Bohemians' partner club St Kevin's Boys before moving to the Bohemians U17 setup in August 2020. The following year he graduated to the U19 team and signed his first professional contract with the club.

=== Bohemians ===
McManus made his senior league debut for Bohemians against UCD in April 2022. He became a regular under Declan Devine during the latter half of the season, making 13 league appearances in total. Extensive interest from Premier League and EFL Championship clubs emerged in early 2023. Bohemians rejected offers from at least one Premier League and two Championship sides for McManus, one of which would have been a record club fee in excess of €250,000 up front with additional add-on clauses. In April 2023 he signed a new multi-year contract with the club. He made 24 league appearances in 2023, scoring 2 goals. He started in the 2023 FAI Cup final, reflecting his rapid ascent within the squad. McManus' progress was curtailed in the 2024 season after he sustained two serious injuries in close succession. He initially injured his ankle, and subsequently suffered a broken leg following his return from the ankle injury. This ultimately resulted in him making only 12 appearances that season. After a strong start to 2025, McManus scored the only goal in a 1–0 win over Cork City at Dalymount Park on 18 April 2025. In May 2025 he signed a new long-term contract extension until the end of 2027.

==== Sligo Rovers loans ====
On 30 June 2025, it was announced that McManus had joined fellow League of Ireland Premier Division side Sligo Rovers on loan until the end of the season. He scored 1 goal in 15 appearances in all competitions during his loan spell with the club, helping them to secure their Premier Division status on the final day of day of the season. Despite starting the first game of the 2026 season for Bohemians, it was announced on 22 February 2026 that he would return to Sligo Rovers on loan for the rest of the season, with McManus citing manager John Russell as a massive influence in his decision to return to the club on loan.

== International career ==
McManus has represented the Republic of Ireland at under-15, under-17, under-18 and under-19 level. In October 2025, he was called up to the Republic of Ireland U21 team for the first time, for their game against Slovakia U21.

== Personal life ==
McManus attended St Declan's College in Cabra. As well as playing for the club, he has supported Bohemians since his youth. He balanced his Leaving Cert with Premier Division football, ultimately achieving 487 points and securing a place to study law at Dublin City University, although he deferred his studies to focus on his football career. He has openly discussed the sacrifices made in exchange for his football career. He previously cycled daily to training, eschewing motor transport in favour of independence and routine.

== Career statistics ==
As of match played on 30 October 2026

Appearances and goals by club, season and competition
Club	Season	League			National Cup (Note: Includes FAI Cup)		Other		Total	
Club	Season	Division	Apps	Goals	Apps	Goals	Apps	Goals	Apps	Goals
Bohemians	2021	LOI Premier Division	0	0	0	0	0	0	0	0
Bohemians	2022	LOI Premier Division	13	0	1	0	–		14	0
Bohemians	2023	LOI Premier Division	24	2	4	0	2 (Note: Appearance(s) in the Leinster Senior Cup)	0	30	2
Bohemians	2024	LOI Premier Division	11	0	1	0	0	0	12	0
Bohemians	2025	LOI Premier Division	12	1	–		1	0	13	1
Bohemians	2026	LOI Premier Division	1	0	–		0	0	1	0
Bohemians	Total		61	3	6	0	3	0	70	3
Sligo Rovers (loan)	2025	LOI Premier Division	13	0	2	1	–		15	1
Sligo Rovers (loan)	2026	LOI Premier Division	27	0	2	0	–		29	0
Career total			101	3	10	1	3	0	114	4

== Honours ==
- Bohemians Young Player of the Year (1): 2023
