= Dayle Rooney =

Irish footballer (born 1998)

Personal information
- Date of birth: 24 February 1998 (age 28)
- Place of birth: Ballymun, Dublin, Ireland
- Position: Winger

Team information
- Current team: Bohemians
- Number: 11

Youth career
- –2015: St Kevin's Boys
- 2015–2016: Shelbourne

Senior career*
Years	Team	Apps	(Gls)
2017–2021	Shelbourne	93	(11)
2022–2023	Drogheda United	68	(10)
2024–	Bohemians	96	(14)
- * Club domestic league appearances and goals as of 16:41, 9 November 2026 (UTC)

Dayle Rooney (born 24 February 1998) is an Irish professional footballer who plays as a winger for League of Ireland Premier Division club Bohemians, having previously played for Drogheda United and Shelbourne, where he started his career.

== Career ==
=== Youth career ===
A native of Ballymun, Rooney began playing association football with St Kevin's Boys. He moved to the academy of League of Ireland club Shelbourne in 2015, where he spent two seasons with club's under-19 side.

=== Shelbourne ===
Rooney made his senior debut for Shelbourne on 17 February 2017, scoring after 7 minutes in a 4–2 win at home to Wexford in the Leinster Senior Cup. He made his League of Ireland First Division debut on 3 March 2017 in a 4–0 loss to UCD at the UCD Bowl. On 4 October 2017, Rooney scored in a 4–2 win away to Dundalk in the 2016–17 Leinster Senior Cup Final. He made 26 appearances, scoring 6 goals in all competitions during his first year in senior football. On 28 September 2018, he was part of the side that won the 2017–18 Leinster Senior Cup by defeating rivals St Patrick's Athletic on penalties after a 1–1 draw following extra time, with Rooney scoring in the shootout. In 2019 he won his first league medal, as Shelbourne won the 2019 League of Ireland First Division to gain promotion. Rooney's first season in the League of Ireland Premier Division did not go well for his side however, as they were relegated straight back to the First Division after losing the Promotion/Relegation Playoff 1–0 to Longford Town at Richmond Park. On 1 October 2021, he was part of the team that defeated Treaty United 1–0 at Tolka Park to claim the 2021 League of Ireland First Division title to yo-yo the club back up to the Premier Division in what proved to be the final of his 110 appearances for the club, in which he scored 19 goals during his 5 seasons at senior level.

=== Drogheda United ===
Rooney signed for League of Ireland Premier Division club Drogheda United on 6 December 2021, ahead of the 2022 season. On 1 April 2022, he scored his first goal for the club in a 1–1 draw away to St Patrick's Athletic. Rooney scored a total of 7 goals in 37 appearances in his first season with the club. He signed a new one-year contract with the club ahead of the 2023 season. On 25 September 2023, he scored a 30-yard first time volley in a 2–1 win away to St Patrick's Athletic that went viral. Rooney left the club at the end of the 2023 season after being voted the clubs Players' Player of the Year for 2023 and scoring 10 goals in 74 appearances during his 2 seasons.

=== Bohemians ===
On 22 November 2023, Rooney signed for Bohemians ahead of their 2024 season, with several other clubs also reportedly interested in signing him during the off-season. His first goal for the club came on 15 March 2024, when he opened the scoring in a 2–1 win over Derry City at Dalymount Park. On 19 July 2024, he scored the only goal of the game in the Dublin derby as his penalty knocked Shamrock Rovers out of the FAI Cup.

== Career statistics ==
As of match played on 30 October 2026

Appearances and goals by club, season and competition
Club	Season	League			National Cup (Note: Includes FAI Cup)		League Cup (Note: Includes League of Ireland Cup)		Europe		Other		Total	
Club	Season	Division	Apps	Goals	Apps	Goals	Apps	Goals	Apps	Goals	Apps	Goals	Apps	Goals
Shelbourne	2017	LOI First Division	21	3	1	0	0	0	–		4 (Note: Appearance(s) in the Leinster Senior Cup)	3	26	6
Shelbourne	2018	LOI First Division	16	3	1	0	1	1	–		3	1	21	5
Shelbourne	2019	LOI First Division	13	1	1	0	1	0	–		1	1	16	2
Shelbourne	2020	LOI Premier Division	17	1	2	2	–		–		1 (Note: Appearance in the 2020 League of Ireland Premier Division Promotion/Relegation Playoff)	0	20	3
Shelbourne	2021	LOI First Division	26	3	1	0	–		–		–		27	3
Shelbourne	Total		93	11	6	2	2	1	–		9	5	110	19
Drogheda United	2022	LOI Premier Division	35	5	2	0	–		–		–		37	5
Drogheda United	2023	LOI Premier Division	33	5	3	0	–		–		1	0	37	5
Drogheda United	Total		68	10	5	0	–		–		1	0	74	10
Bohemians	2024	LOI Premier Division	35	7	4	1	–		–		0	0	39	8
Bohemians	2025	LOI Premier Division	36	4	1	0	–		–		1	0	38	4
Bohemians	2026	LOI Premier Division	25	3	2	0	–		6 (Note: Appearance(s) in the UEFA Conference League)	1	1	0	34	4
Bohemians	Total		96	14	7	1	–		6	1	2	0	111	16
Career total			257	35	18	3	2	1	6	1	12	5	295	45

== Honours ==
=== Club ===
Shelbourne

- League of Ireland First Division (2): 2019, 2021
- Leinster Senior Cup (2): 2016–17, 2017–18

=== Individual ===
- Drogheda United Players' Player of the Year (1): 2023
