= 2024 Bohemian F.C. season =

Irish football club season

Bohemian F.C.
2024 season
- Manager: Alan Reynolds
- Stadium: Dalymount Park, Phibsborough, Dublin 7
- Premier Division: 8th
- FAI Cup: Semi-final
- Leinster Senior Cup: Fourth round
- Top goalscorer: League: Dayle Rooney (7 goals); All: Dayle Rooney (8 goals)
- Highest home attendance: 4436 vs Shamrock Rovers 1 September, Premier Division
- Lowest home attendance: 3761 vs St Patrick's Athletic 14 October, Premier Division
- Biggest win: 0–4 vs UCD (A) 13 September, FAI Cup
- Biggest defeat: 0–2 vs Shelbourne (H) 4 March, Premier Division; 2–0 vs Dundalk (A) 26 March, Premier Division; 0–2 vs Sligo Rovers (H) 12 July, Premier Division
Home colours	Away colours	Third colours

The 2024 League of Ireland Premier Division season was Bohemian Football Club's 134th year in their history and their 40th consecutive season in the League of Ireland Premier Division since it became the top tier of Irish football. Bohemians participated in the FAI Cup and also competed in the Leinster Senior Cup during preseason. Bohemians parted ways with manager Declan Devine after four games of the league season with Alan Reynolds taking the reins subsequently.

== Club ==
=== Kits ===
Supplier: O'Neills | Sponsor: Des Kelly Interiors

==== Home ====
Bohemians home shirt for 2024 was designed by in-house club designers and produced in Ireland by kit partner O’Neills. The jersey commemorates the 100th anniversary of Bohemians winning the first national league title in the club's history in what was then called the Football League of the Irish Free State.

The 2024 jersey retains the club's famous red and black stripes but with the one-off inclusion of a Celtic knotwork pattern as was popular during the infancy of the Irish Free State and following the Gaelic Revival of the 19th century. The jersey also includes the club's name in the Irish language in a traditional typeface on the back, the aforementioned 1924 league win is commemorated on a hem tag on the front, and a woven v-neck collar with ‘Céad bliain’ (100 years) inscription.

==== Away ====
Bohs away kit was released just ahead of the season's start and pays tribute to Thin Lizzy’s famous 1977 gig at Dalymount Park, which was Dublin's first major rock festival. The strip features a quote from The Boys Are Back in Town on the neck, black rose detailing throughout the body, as well as sleeve trims, and an embroidered hem tag of an original concert poster on the lower front. Shirt sales will raise funds to provide access for underprivileged children in Dublin.

==== Third ====
Bohs retained their Dublin Bus kit from the two previous seasons for the first series of games. The kit takes inspiration from Dublin Bus’ iconic seat fabric design.

In April, Bohs released their official third kit in conjunction with Irish Congress of Trade Unions. Liberty Hall, home of SIPTU is at the forefront of the body of the jersey, alongside the Better in a trade union campaign message. The jersey also features trade union leader James Connolly’s famous quote: “Our demands most moderate are – we only want the earth.” An embroidered hem tag on the lower front of the jersey features a trade union banner with a red and black version of the Starry Plough flag.

=== Management team ===
Position	Name
Manager	(Republic of Ireland) Alan Reynolds
Assistant manager	(Republic of Ireland) Stephen O'Donnell
Technical assistant	(Republic of Ireland) Derek Pender
Goalkeeping coach	(Republic of Ireland) Seán Fogarty
Lead physiotherapist	(Republic of Ireland) David Murphy
Director of football	(Republic of Ireland) Pat Fenlon
Equipment manager	(Republic of Ireland) Colin O Connor
Assistant equipment manager	(Republic of Ireland) Aaron Fitzsimons
Analyst	(Republic of Ireland) Alan Moore

=== Former ===
Position	Name	Departure
Head coach	(Northern Ireland) Declan Devine	March 2024
Assistant coach	(Republic of Ireland) Gary Cronin	March 2024
Strength and conditioning coach	(Republic of Ireland) Graham Norton	September 2024

== Transfers ==
=== Transfers in ===
Date	Pos.	Player	From	Fee	Source
Winter
January 2024	MF	(Republic of Ireland) Dayle Rooney	(Republic of Ireland) Drogheda United	Free	
January 2024	DF	(Republic of Ireland) Rob Cornwall	(United States) Northern Colorado Hailstorm	Free	
January 2024	ST	(Estonia) Sten Reinkort	(Estonia) Flora Tallinn	Free	
January 2024	DF	(Estonia) Michael Lilander	(Estonia) Flora Tallinn	Free	
January 2024	MF	(Estonia) Martin Miller	(Estonia) Flora Tallinn	Free	
February 2024	GK	(Poland) Kacper Chorążka	(Cyprus) ASIL Lysi	Free	
February 2024	MF	(Republic of Ireland) Brian McManus	(Republic of Ireland) Shelbourne	Free	
February 2024	ST	(Poland) Filip Piszczek	(Japan) FC Imabari	Free	
February 2024	DF	(Republic of Ireland) Jevon Mills	(England) Hull City	Loan	
February 2024	DF	(United States) Aboubacar Keita	(United States) Colorado Rapids	Loan	
February 2024	DF	(England) Luke Matheson	(England) Bolton Wanderers	Loan	
February 2024	DF	(Republic of Ireland) Divin Isamala	(Republic of Ireland) St Francis	Free	
Summer
May 2024	DF	(Republic of Ireland) Jake Carroll	Unattached	Free agent	
July 2024	ST	(Republic of Ireland) Chris Lotefa	(Republic of Ireland) Finn Harps	Loan end	
July 2024	MF	(Republic of Ireland) Ross Tierney	(Scotland) Motherwell	Undisclosed	
July 2024	DF	(Republic of Ireland) Leigh Kavanagh	(England) Brighton & Hove Albion	Free	
July 2024	MF	(Scotland) Archie Meekison	(Scotland) Dundee United	Free	
July 2024	ST	(New Zealand) Alex Greive	(Scotland) St Mirren	Free	
July 2024	DF	(Scotland) Liam Smith	(England) Cheltenham Town	Free	
July 2024	MF	(Republic of Ireland) Dawson Devoy	(England) MK Dons	Undisclosed	

=== Transfers out ===
Date	Pos.	Player	To	Fee	Source
Winter
January 2024	FW	(Republic of Ireland) Dean Williams	(Republic of Ireland) Shelbourne	Released	
January 2024	MF	(Republic of Ireland) John O'Sullivan	(Republic of Ireland) Shelbourne	Released	
January 2024	DF	(England) Louie Holzman	(England) Reading	Loan end	
January 2024	MF	(Canada) Kris Twardek	(Canada) Atlético Ottawa	Released	
January 2024	DF	(Poland) Krystian Nowak	(Kazakhstan) FC Zhenis	Released	
January 2024	MF	(Scotland) Ali Coote	(United States) Detroit City	Released	
January 2024	DF	(Poland) Kacper Radkowski	(Poland) Śląsk Wrocław	Loan end	
January 2024	FW	(Republic of Ireland) Jonathan Afolabi	(Belgium) KV Kortrijk	Undisclosed	
January 2024	FW	(Republic of Ireland) Chris Lotefa	(Republic of Ireland) Finn Harps	Loan	
Summer
June 2024	DF	(Poland) Bartlomiej Kukulowicz	(Poland) Stal Stalowa Wola	Released	
June 2024	DF	(England) Luke Matheson	(England) Bolton Wanderers	Loan end	
June 2024	DF	(Estonia) Michael Lilander	(Estonia) Paide	Released	
June 2024	ST	(Estonia) Sten Reinkort	(Turkey) Şanlıurfaspor	Released	
July 2024	ST	(Republic of Ireland) Chris Lotefa	(Republic of Ireland) Longford Town	Loan	
July 2024	DF	(Republic of Ireland) Divin Isamala	(Republic of Ireland) Wexford	Loan	
July 2024	GK	(United States) Luke Dennison	(Republic of Ireland) Drogheda United	Free	
July 2024	MF	(Republic of Ireland) Dylan Connolly	(Northern Ireland) Glentoran	Undisclosed	
August 2024	DF	(United States) Aboubacar Keita	(United States) Colorado Rapids	Loan end	

== First Team Squad ==
No.	Player	Nat.	Pos.	Date of birth (age)	Since	Ends	Last club
Goalkeepers
1	James Talbot	(Republic of Ireland)	GK	24 April 1997 (age 29)	2019	2024	(England) Sunderland
30	Kacper Chorążka	(Poland)	GK	18 April 1999 (age 27)	2024	2026	(Cyprus) ASIL Lysi
–	Luke Dennison	(United States)	GK	21 August 1996 (age 30)	2023	2024	(Republic of Ireland) Longford Town
Defenders
2	Liam Smith	(Scotland)	RB	10 April 1998 (age 28)	2024	2025	(England) Cheltenham Town
3	Paddy Kirk	(Republic of Ireland)	LB	2 June 1998 (age 28)	2023	2024	(Republic of Ireland) Sligo Rovers
5	Rob Cornwall	(Republic of Ireland)	CB	16 October 1994 (age 31)	2024	2025	(United States) Northern Colorado Hailstorm
20	Leigh Kavanagh	(Republic of Ireland)	CB	27 December 2000 (age 25)	2024	2025	(England) Brighton & Hove Albion
24	Cian Byrne	(Republic of Ireland)	CB	31 January 2003 (age 23)	2022	2024	(Republic of Ireland) Bohemians U19
33	Jake Carroll	(Republic of Ireland)	LB	11 August 1991 (age 35)	2024	2024	Unattached
38	Jevon Mills	(Republic of Ireland)	CB	27 September 2003 (age 23)	2024	2024	(England) Hull City
-	Bartlomiej Kukulowicz	(Poland)	RB	11 October 2000 (age 25)	2023	2024	(Poland) Bruk-Bet Termalica Nieciecza
-	Michael Lilander	(Estonia)	RB	20 June 1997 (age 29)	2024	2025	(Estonia) Flora Tallinn
-	Luke Matheson	(England)	RB	3 October 2002 (age 23)	2024	2024	(England) Bolton Wanderers
-	Aboubacar Keita	(United States)	CB	6 April 2000 (age 26)	2024	2024	(United States) Colorado Rapids
Midfielders
6	Jordan Flores	(England)	CM	4 October 1995 (age 30)	2022	2024	(England) Northampton Town
7	Declan McDaid	(Scotland)	LM	22 November 1995 (age 30)	2022	2024	(Scotland) Dundee
8	Dayle Rooney	(Republic of Ireland)	LM	24 February 1998 (age 28)	2024	2025	(Republic of Ireland) Drogheda United
10	Dawson Devoy	(Republic of Ireland)	CM	20 November 2001 (age 24)	2024	2025	(England) MK Dons
12	Danny Grant	(Republic of Ireland)	RM	23 December 2000 (age 25)	2023	2024	(England) Huddersfield Town
14	James McManus	(Republic of Ireland)	CM	16 March 2005 (age 21)	2022	2025	(Republic of Ireland) Bohemians U19
15	James Clarke	(Republic of Ireland)	AM	28 January 2001 (age 25)	2022	2025	(Republic of Ireland) Drogheda United
16	Keith Buckley (C)	(Republic of Ireland)	CM	17 June 1992 (age 34)	2023	2026	(Australia) Blacktown Spartans
17	Adam McDonnell	(Republic of Ireland)	CM	14 May 1997 (age 29)	2023	2025	(Republic of Ireland) Sligo Rovers
18	Brian McManus	(Republic of Ireland)	CM	29 November 2001 (age 24)	2024	2025	(Republic of Ireland) Shelbourne
19	Martin Miller	(Estonia)	AM	25 September 1997 (age 29)	2024	2025	(Estonia) Flora Tallinn
23	Archie Meekison	(Scotland)	MF	4 May 2002 (age 24)	2024	2025	(Scotland) Dundee United
26	Ross Tierney	(Republic of Ireland)	CM	6 March 2001 (age 25)	2024	2025	(Scotland) Motherwell
–	Dylan Connolly	(Republic of Ireland)	RM	2 May 1995 (age 31)	2023	2025	(England) Morecambe
Forwards
9	Filip Piszczek	(Poland)	CF	26 May 1995 (age 31)	2024	2025	(Japan) FC Imabari
11	James Akintunde	(England)	CF	29 March 1996 (age 30)	2022	2024	(Republic of Ireland) Derry City
21	Alex Greive	(New Zealand)	CF	13 May 1999 (age 27)	2024	2025	(Scotland) St Mirren
29	Nickson Okosun	(Republic of Ireland)	CF	26 November 2006 (age 19)	2022	2024	(Republic of Ireland) Bohemians U19
-	Sten Reinkort	(Estonia)	CF	29 April 1998 (age 28)	2024	2025	(Estonia) Flora Tallinn

Player(s) in italics left during the season

== Friendlies ==
=== Pre-season ===
20 January Friendly	Shelbourne	2–1	Bohemians	Cloughran
11:00	Hakiki 12'; Wilson 44'	Report	Connolly 32'	Stadium: AUL Complex; Attendance: N/A; Referee: Declan Troy
Note: Behind closed doors

26 January Friendly	St Patrick's Athletic	1–1	Bohemians	Abbotstown
11:00	Keating 69'	Report	Okosun 76'	Stadium: FAI National Training Centre; Attendance: N/A; Referee: Paul Norton
Note: Behind closed doors

29 January Friendly	Rangers B (Scotland)	2–2	(Republic of Ireland) Bohemians	Glasgow, Scotland
15:00	Kukulowicz 57' (o.g.); Rice 75' (pen.)	Report	Grant 17'; Flores 73'	Stadium: Rangers Training Centre; Attendance: N/A; Referee: Steven Smith
Note: Behind closed doors

31 January Friendly	Celtic B (Scotland)	1–1	(Republic of Ireland) Bohemians	Lennoxtown, Scotland
13:30	Cummings 37'	Report	Clarke 35'	Stadium: Lennoxtown Training Centre; Attendance: N/A; Referee: Colin Cantwell
Note: Behind closed doors

9 February Friendly	Bohemians	1–0	Cork City	Coolock
15:00	McDaid 60'			Stadium: Oscar Traynor Centre; Attendance: N/A; Referee: Rob Hennessy
Note: Behind closed doors

=== Mid-season ===
14 June Friendly	Bohemians (Republic of Ireland)	2–1	(Wales) The New Saints	Coolock
14:00GMT	Piszcek 17' 67'	Report	Holden 6'	Stadium: Oscar Traynor Centre; Attendance: N/A; Referee: Paul Norton
Note: Behind closed doors

== Competitions ==
=== League of Ireland ===
==== League table ====
Pos	Team	Pld	W	D	L	GF	GA	GD	Pts	Qualification or relegation
1	Shelbourne (C)	36	17	12	7	40	27	+13	63	Qualification for Champions League first qualifying round
2	Shamrock Rovers	36	17	10	9	50	35	+15	61	Qualification for Conference League second qualifying round (Note: Drogheda United were expelled from the Conference League second qualifying round which they qualified as the 2024 FAI Cup winners, as their owners Trivela Group also own Danish club Silkeborg, who finished seventh in Danish Superliga. Due to the multi-club ownership rule, only Silkeborg could be admitted to the Conference League as they have a higher league position. As no team from Republic of Ireland could replace them because of UEFA licensing issues, the second-placed Shamrock Rovers were moved from the first qualifying round to the second qualifying round along with Dinamo City of Albania, the next highest association cup winners.)
3	St Patrick's Athletic	36	17	8	11	51	37	+14	59	Qualification for Conference League first qualifying round
4	Derry City	36	14	13	9	48	31	+17	55	
5	Galway United	36	13	13	10	33	29	+4	52	
6	Sligo Rovers	36	13	10	13	40	51	−11	49	
7	Waterford	36	13	6	17	43	47	−4	45	
8	Bohemians	36	10	12	14	39	43	−4	42	
9	Drogheda United (O)	36	7	13	16	41	58	−17	34	Qualification for promotion/relegation play-off
10	Dundalk (R)	36	5	11	20	23	50	−27	26	Relegation to League of Ireland First Division

Source: SSE Airtricity League, Soccerway
Rules for classification: 1) Points; 2) Goal difference; 3) Goals scored.
(C) Champions; (O) Play-off winners; (R) Relegated

==== League Matches ====
Win Draw Loss

16 February 1	Bohemians	2–2	Sligo Rovers	Phibsborough
19:45	Reinkort 5'; Clarke 90+4'	Report	Hutchinson 23'; Hartmann 45+3'	Stadium: Dalymount Park; Attendance: 4432; Referee: Rob Harvey

23 February 2	St Patrick's Athletic	0–1	Bohemians	Inchicore
19:45		Report	Flores 79' (pen.)	Stadium: Richmond Park; Attendance: 5013; Referee: Rob Hennessy

1 March 3	Bohemians	P-P	Dundalk	Phibsborough
19:45				Stadium: Dalymount Park
Note: Game postponed due to inclement weather.

4 March 4	Drogheda United	2–1	Bohemians	Drogheda
19:45	Grant 45' (o.g.); Weir 58'	Report	Clarke 64'	Stadium: Weavers Park; Attendance: 2047; Referee: Gavin Colfer
Note: Away fans banned from fixture as per FAI.

8 March 5	Bohemians	0–2	Shelbourne	Phibsborough
19:45		Report	Jarvis 80' (pen.); Molloy 85'	Stadium: Dalymount Park; Attendance: 4429; Referee: Paul McLaughlin

15 March 6	Bohemians	2–1	Derry City	Phibsborough
19:45	Rooney 30'; Akintunde 77'	Report	Boyce 79'	Stadium: Dalymount Park; Attendance: 4246; Referee: Rob Hennessy

29 March 7	Shamrock Rovers	3–1	Bohemians	Tallaght
19:45	Kenny 49'; Burns 53'; Greene 73'	Report	McDaid 90+1'	Stadium: Tallaght Stadium; Attendance: 10094; Referee: Rob Harvey
Note: Game broadcast live on RTE2

1 April 8	Galway United	0–2	Bohemians	Galway
19:45		Report	Mills 21'; Akintunde 57'	Stadium: Eamonn Deacy Park; Attendance: 3538; Referee: Gavin Colfer
Note: Game broadcast live on Virgin Media Two

5 April 9	Bohemians	0–1	Waterford	Phibsborough
19:45		Report	Amond 31'	Stadium: Dalymount Park; Attendance: 4342; Referee: Kevin O Sullivan

12 April 10	Shelbourne	1–2	Bohemians	Drumcondra
19:45	Jarvis 63' (pen.)	Report	Flores 37' (pen.), 41'	Stadium: Tolka Park; Attendance: 4855; Referee: Paul McLaughlin
Note: Game broadcast live on RTE2

15 April 3	Bohemians	1–0	Dundalk	Phibsborough
19:45	Akintunde 80'	Report		Stadium: Dalymount Park; Attendance: 4045; Referee: Eoghan O'Shea.
Note: Rearranged fixture from Round 3.

19 April 11	Bohemians	1–0	Drogheda United	Phibsborough
19:45	Akintunde 15'	Report		Stadium: Dalymount Park; Attendance: 4305; Referee: Gavin Colfer

26 April 12	Dundalk	2–0	Bohemians	Dundalk
19:45	High 13'; Benson 35'	Report		Stadium: Oriel Park; Attendance: 2770; Referee: Rob Hennessy

3 May 13	Bohemians	1–1	Shamrock Rovers	Phibsborough
19:45	Piszczek 24'	Report	Kenny 42'	Stadium: Dalymount Park; Attendance: 4429; Referee: Damien MacGraith

6 May 14	Bohemians	0–1	Galway United	Phibsborough
17:00		Report	Nugent 18'	Stadium: Dalymount Park; Attendance: 4101; Referee: Paul Norton

10 May 15	Derry City	1–0	Bohemians	Derry
19:45	Duffy 85'	Report		Stadium: The Brandywell; Attendance: 2574; Referee: Rob Harvey

17 May 16	Sligo Rovers	0–3	Bohemians	Sligo
19:45		Report	Clarke 2'; Keita 35'; Rooney 61'	Stadium: The Showgrounds; Attendance: 2087; Referee: Gavin Colfer
Note: Game broadcast live on RTE2

24 May 17	Bohemians	2–2	St Patrick's Athletic	Phibsborough
19:45	Akintunde 40'; Grant 90+2'	Report	Forrester 28' (pen.); C Kavanagh 45+6'	Stadium: Dalymount Park; Attendance: 4,431; Referee: Rob Harvey

31 May 18	Waterford	2–1	Bohemians	Waterford
19:45	Pattisson 9'; Amond 70'	Report	Rooney 30'	Stadium: Waterford Regional Sports Centre; Attendance: 2994; Referee: Alan Patchell

3 June 19	Bohemians	P-P	Shelbourne	Phibsborough
17:15				Stadium: Dalymount Park
Note: Game postponed due to international call-ups

7 June 20	Shamrock Rovers	P-P	Bohemians	Tallaght
20:00				Stadium: Tallaght Stadium
Note: Game postponed due to international call-ups

13 June 21	Bohemians	1–2	Derry City	Phibsborough
19:45	Grant 15'	Report	Diallo 17'; Mullen 90+4'	Stadium: Dalymount Park; Attendance: 3843; Referee: Rob Hennessy

28 June 22	St Patrick's Athletic	0–0	Bohemians	Inchicore
19:45		Report		Stadium: Richmond Park; Attendance: 5015; Referee: Paul McLaughlin

4 July 23	Galway United	1–1	Bohemians	Galway
19:45	Slevin 50'	Report	Rooney 4' (pen.)	Stadium: Eamonn Deacy Park; Attendance: 2319; Referee: Eoghan O'Shea

12 July 24	Bohemians	0–2	Sligo Rovers	Phibsborough
19:45			Waweru 36'; Chapman 90+5'; Mallon (red card) 38'	Stadium: Dalymount Park; Attendance: 4119; Referee: Mark Lynch

26 July 25	Bohemians	1–1	Dundalk	Phibsborough
19:45	Tierney 19'	Report	Horgan 27'	Stadium: Dalymount Park; Attendance: 4239; Referee: Eoghan O'Shea

2 August 26	Drogheda United	2–2	Bohemians	Drogheda
19:45	Farrell 9'; Byrne 60' (o.g.)	Report	Rooney 18' (pen.); Bolger 22' (o.g.); Kavanagh (red card) 90+1'	Stadium: Weavers Park; Attendance: 2296; Referee: Robert Harvey

9 August 27	Bohemians	2–3	Waterford	Phibsborough
19:45	Rooney 6'; Devoy 37'	Report	McDonell 46' (o.g.); Power 62'; Glenfield 81'	Stadium: Dalymount Park; Attendance: 4267; Referee: Damien MacGraith

23 August 28	Shelbourne	1–1	Bohemians	Drumcondra
19:45	Grant 12'	Report	Coote 14'	Stadium: Tolka Park; Attendance: 4830; Referee: Damien MacGraith

1 September 29	Bohemians	2–1	Shamrock Rovers	Phibsborough
11:30	Tierney 24'; Piszczek 84'	Report	Farrugia 15'	Stadium: Dalymount Park; Attendance: 4436; Referee: Paul McLaughlin
Note: Kick-off time moved to morning as per Gardaí

6 September 19	Bohemians	1–1	Shelbourne	Phibsborough
19:45	Smith 59'	Report	Tierney 83'	Stadium: Dalymount Park; Attendance: 4429; Referee: Neil Doyle
Note: Rescheduled game from June 3

20 September 31	Bohemians	0–1	Drogheda United	Phibsborough
19:45		Report	Pierrot 28'	Stadium: Dalymount Park; Attendance: 4275; Referee: Rob Harvey

23 September 20	Shamrock Rovers	1–0	Bohemians	Tallaght
20:00	Burke 84'	Report		Stadium: Tallaght Stadium; Attendance: 6119; Referee: Rob Hennessy
Note: Rescheduled fixture from 7 June

27 September 32	Dundalk	0–2	Bohemians	Dundalk
19:45			Devoy 58'; McDonnell 85'	Stadium: Oriel Park; Attendance: 3080; Referee: Kevin O'Sullivan

4 October 33	Bohemians	P-P	St Patrick's Athletic	Phibsborough
19:45				Stadium: Dalymount Park

11 October 30	Derry City	1–1	Bohemians	Derry
19:45	Hoban 61'	Report	Meekison 20'	Stadium: The Brandywell; Attendance: 3123; Referee: Neil Doyle
Note: Rescheduled fixture from 13 September

14 October 2024 33	Bohemians	1–3	St Patrick's Athletic	Phibsborough
19:45	Devoy 89'; Tierney (yellow card) 49' (yellow-red card)		Forrester 60'; Mulraney 76'; Redmond 81'	Stadium: Dalymount Park; Attendance: 3,761; Referee: Rob Hennessey
Note: Rescheduled fixture from October 4

19 October 34	Sligo Rovers	0–2	Bohemians	Sligo
19:45		Report	Devoy 23'; Meekison 82'	Stadium: The Showgrounds; Attendance: 3436; Referee: Rob Harvey

25 October 35	Waterford	1–1	Bohemians	Waterford
19:45	Glenfield 90+3'	Report	Clarke 81'	Stadium: Waterford Regional Sports Centre; Attendance: 2463; Referee: Damien MacGraith

1 November 36	Bohemians	1–1	Galway United	Phibsborough
19:45	Rooney 21'	Report	Hurley 40'	Stadium: Dalymount Park; Attendance: 4196; Referee: Rob Hennessy

==== Results summary ====
Overall								Home						Away					
Pld	W	D	L	GF	GA	GD	Pts	W	D	L	GF	GA	GD	W	D	L	GF	GA	GD
36	10	12	14	41	41	0	42	4	6	8	18	25	−7	6	6	6	23	16	+7

==== Results by match day ====
Round	1	2	3	4	5	6	7	8	9	10	11	12	13	14	15	16	17	18	19	20	21	22	23	24	25	26	27	28	29	30	31	32	33	34	35	36
Ground	H	A	A	H	H	A	A	H	A	H	H	A	H	H	A	A	H	A	H	A	A	H	H	A	H	A	H	H	H	A	A	A	H	A	A	H
Result	D	W	L	L	W	L	W	L	W	W	W	L	D	L	L	W	D	L	L	D	D	L	D	D	L	D	W	D	L	L	W	D	L	W	D	D
Position	3	2	6	7	6	7	6	8	5	3	2	4	4	5	6	5	6	6	8	8	8	8	8	8	8	8	8	8	8	8	8	8	8	8	8	8

Updated to match(es) played on 2 November 2024. Source: 2024 League of Ireland Premier Division
A = Away; H = Home; W = Win; D = Draw; L = Loss

=== FAI Cup ===
19 July Round 2	Bohemians	1–0	Shamrock Rovers	Phibsborough
19:45	Rooney 67' (pen.)	Report		Stadium: Dalymount Park; Attendance: 4431; Referee: Rob Hennessy

18 August Round 3	Kerry	2–2 (a.e.t.) (2–4 p)	Bohemians	Tralee, County Kerry
16:00	Kelliher 43', 52'		Clarke 22'; Greive 44'	Stadium: Mounthawk Park; Attendance: 1,110; Referee: Neil Doyle
	Penalties
	Brosnan (penalty scored); Amechi (penalty missed); Barrett (penalty missed); Crowe (penalty scored)		Tierney (penalty scored); Devoy (penalty scored); Grant (penalty scored); McDaid (penalty scored)

13 September Quarter Final	UCD	0–4	Bohemians	Belfield
19:45	Holohan (red card) 59'	Report	Tierney 34' 54'; Greive 89'; Miller 90+3'	Stadium: UCD Bowl; Attendance: 2233; Referee: Damien MacGraith

4 October Semi Final	Bohemians	0–2	Derry City	Phibsborough
19:45		Report	Duffy 40' 72'	Stadium: Dalymount Park; Attendance: 4300; Referee: Paul McLaughlin
Note: Game shown live on RTE2 Television

=== Leinster Senior Cup ===
==== Group A ====
Team	Pld	W	D	L	GF	GA	GD	Pts
Drogheda United	3	3	0	0	9	4	+5	9
Dundalk	3	1	1	1	4	3	+2	4
Bohemians	3	1	1	1	2	3	−1	4
Malahide	3	0	0	3	3	8	−5	0

==== Group Stage Matches ====
Win Draw Loss

22 January Matchday 1	Drogheda United	3–1	Bohemians	Drogheda
19:30	Weir 18'; Pierrot 21'; O'Brien 79'		Smith 73'	Stadium: Weavers Park; Attendance: 626; Referee: Robert Harvey

28 January Matchday 2	Malahide United	0–1	Bohemians	Malahide
18:30		Report	Brennan 80'	Stadium: Gannon Park; Attendance: 200; Referee: Daryl Carolan

5 February Matchday 3	Dundalk	0–0	Bohemians	Dundalk
19:45		Report		Stadium: Oriel Park; Attendance: 400; Referee: Rob Harvey

=== Overview ===
Competition	Record							
Competition	P	W	D	L	GF	GA	GD	Win %
Premier Division	36	10	12	14	39	43	−4	27.78
FAI Cup	4	3	0	1	7	4	+3	75.00
Leinster Senior Cup	3	1	1	1	2	3	−1	33.33
Total	43	14	13	16	48	47	+1	32.56

Updated to match played 2 November 2024
Source: Competitions

== Statistics ==
=== Appearances and goals ===
No.	Pos.	Player	League		FAI Cup		LSC		Total	
No.	Pos.	Player	Apps	Goals	Apps	Goals	Apps	Goals	Apps	Goals
1	GK	(Republic of Ireland) James Talbot	2	0	0	0	0	0	2	0
2	DF	(Scotland) Liam Smith	9(1)	0	3	0	0	0	12(1)	0
3	DF	(Republic of Ireland) Paddy Kirk	33(2)	0	3(2)	0	0	0	36(4)	0
4	MF	(Latvia) Markuss Strods	1(1)	0	0	0	2	0	3(1)	0
5	DF	(Republic of Ireland) Rob Cornwall	1	0	0	0	0	0	1	0
6	MF	(Republic of Ireland) Jordan Flores	29(1)	3	3	0	0	0	32(1)	3
7	MF	(Scotland) Declan McDaid	26(20)	1	2(2)	0	0	0	28(22)	1
8	MF	(Republic of Ireland) Dayle Rooney	35(3)	7	4	1	0	0	39(3)	8
9	FW	(Poland) Filip Piszczek	22(18)	2	3(2)	0	0	0	25(20)	2
10	MF	(Republic of Ireland) Dawson Devoy	13	4	3	0	0	0	16	4
11	FW	(England) James Akintunde	27(9)	5	2(2)	0	0	0	29(11)	5
12	MF	(Republic of Ireland) Danny Grant	29(13)	3	4(2)	0	0	0	33(15)	3
13	DF	(Republic of Ireland) Divin Isamala	0	0	0	0	0	0	0	0
14	DF	(Republic of Ireland) James McManus	11(3)	0	1(1)	0	0	0	12(4)	0
15	MF	(Republic of Ireland) James Clarke	34(8)	4	4(2)	1	0	0	38(10)	5
16	MF	(Republic of Ireland) Keith Buckley	0	0	0	0	0	0	0	0
17	MF	(Republic of Ireland) Adam McDonnell	35(2)	1	3	0	0	0	38(2)	1
18	MF	(Republic of Ireland) Brian McManus	16(12)	0	1	0	0	0	17(12)	0
19	MF	(Estonia) Martin Miller	20(6)	0	3(2)	1	0	0	23(8)	1
20	DF	(Republic of Ireland) Leigh Kavanagh	7(1)	0	3	0	0	0	10(1)	0
21	FW	(New Zealand) Alex Greive	11(8)	0	4(1)	2	0	0	15(9)	2
22	MF	(Republic of Ireland) Rhys Brennan	1(1)	0	0	0	3(3)	1	4(4)	1
23	MF	(Scotland) Archie Meekison	11(4)	2	2(1)	0	0	0	13(5)	2
24	DF	(Republic of Ireland) Cian Byrne	25(3)	0	3	0	0	0	28(3)	0
26	MF	(Republic of Ireland) Ross Tierney	13(1)	3	4	2	0	0	17(1)	5
27	MF	(Republic of Ireland) Billy Gilmore	0	0	0	0	2	0	2	0
28	MF	(Republic of Ireland) Sean Moore	0	0	0	0	3(1)	0	3(1)	0
29	FW	(Republic of Ireland) Nickson Okosun	5(5)	0	0	0	3(2)	0	8(7)	0
30	GK	(Poland) Kacper Chorążka	34	0	4	0	0	0	38	0
31	DF	(Republic of Ireland) Declan Osagie	0	0	0	0	2	0	2	0
33	DF	(Republic of Ireland) Jake Carroll	9(2)	0	0	0	0	0	9(2)	0
35	GK	(Republic of Ireland) Joe Collins	0	0	0	0	1	0	1	0
36	MF	(Republic of Ireland) Christopher Conlon	0	0	0	0	0	0	0	0
38	DF	(Republic of Ireland) Jevon Mills	24(6)	1	2	0	0	0	26(6)	1
40	GK	(Republic of Ireland) Rian Hogan	0	0	0	0	2	0	2	0
–	ST	(Republic of Ireland) Chris Lotefa	0	0	0	0	0	0	0	0
–	DF	(Republic of Ireland) Finn Cowper Gray	0	0	0	0	3	0	3	0
–	DF	(Republic of Ireland) Josh Lyons	0	0	0	0	2	0	2	0
–	DF	(Republic of Ireland) Pharrel Manuel	0	0	0	0	2(1)	0	2(1)	0
–	MF	(Republic of Ireland) Victor Lace	0	0	0	0	3	0	3	0
–	MF	(Republic of Ireland) Jake Hough	0	0	0	0	2	0	2	0
–	MF	(Republic of Ireland) Hugh Smith	0	0	0	0	3	1	3	1
–	FW	(Republic of Ireland) Onesime Tembe	0	0	0	0	3(1)	0	3(1)	0
–	FW	(Republic of Ireland) Taylor Mooney	0	0	0	0	3(1)	0	3(1)	0
–	DF	(Republic of Ireland) Sean McCarthy	0	0	0	0	1	0	1	0
–	DF	(Republic of Ireland) Callum Doyle-Travers	0	0	0	0	2	0	2	0
–	MF	(Republic of Ireland) Shane Tracey	0	0	0	0	1	0	1	0
Players left club during season
2	DF	(Poland) Bartlomiej Kukulowicz	2(1)	0	0	0	0	0	2(1)	0
4	DF	(United States) Aboubacar Keita	16(4)	1	0	0	0	0	16(4)	1
10	MF	(Republic of Ireland) Dylan Connolly	19(9)	0	0	0	0	0	19(9)	0
20	FW	(Estonia) Sten Reinkort	8(5)	1	0	0	0	0	8(5)	1
25	GK	(United States) Luke Dennison	0	0	0	0	0	0	0	0
27	DF	(Estonia) Michael Lilander	8(1)	0	0	0	0	0	8(1)	0
41	DF	(England) Luke Matheson	10(2)	0	0	0	0	0	10(2)	0

=== Top Scorers ===
No.	Player	League	FAI Cup	LSC	Total
8	(Republic of Ireland) Dayle Rooney	7	1	0	8
11	(England) James Akintunde	5	0	0	5
15	(Republic of Ireland) James Clarke	4	1	0	5
26	(Republic of Ireland) Ross Tierney	3	2	0	5
10	(Republic of Ireland) Dawson Devoy	4	0	0	4
6	(England) Jordan Flores	3	0	0	3
12	(Republic of Ireland) Danny Grant	3	0	0	3
9	(Poland) Filip Piszczek	2	0	0	2
23	(Scotland) Archie Meekison	2	0	0	2
21	(New Zealand) Alex Greive	0	2	0	2
7	(Scotland) Declan McDaid	1	0	0	1
17	(Republic of Ireland) Adam McDonnell	1	0	0	1
38	(Republic of Ireland) Jevon Mills	1	0	0	1
19	(Estonia) Martin Miller	0	1	0	1
–	(Republic of Ireland) Hugh Smith	0	0	1	1
–	(Republic of Ireland) Rhys Brennan	0	0	1	1
N/A	Own goal(s)	1	0	0	1
Players left club during season
4	(United States) Aboubacar Keita	1	0	0	1
20	(Estonia) Sten Reinkort	1	0	0	1
Total		39	7	2	48

=== Clean Sheets ===
No.	Player	League	FAI Cup	LSC	Total
30	(Poland) Kacper Chorążka	8/34	2/4	0/0	10/38
1	(Republic of Ireland) James Talbot	0/2	0/0	0/0	0/2
35	(Republic of Ireland) Joe Collins	0/0	0/0	0/1	0/1
40	(Republic of Ireland) Rian Hogan	0/0	0/0	2/2	2/2
Players left club during season
25	(United States) Luke Dennison	0/0	0/0	0/0	0/0
Total		8/36	2/4	2/3	12/43

=== Discipline ===
No.	Pos.	Player	League			FAI Cup			LSC			Total		
No.	Pos.	Player	Booked	(yellow card) (yellow-red card)	Sent off (straight red)	Booked	(yellow card) (yellow-red card)	Sent off (straight red)	Booked	(yellow card) (yellow-red card)	Sent off (straight red)	Booked	(yellow card) (yellow-red card)	Sent off (straight red)
1	GK	(Republic of Ireland) James Talbot	0	0	0	0	0	0	0	0	0	0	0	0
2	DF	(Scotland) Liam Smith	1	0	0	0	0	0	0	0	0	1	0	0
3	DF	(Republic of Ireland) Paddy Kirk	9	0	0	0	0	0	0	0	0	9	0	0
4	MF	(Latvia) Markuss Strods	0	0	0	0	0	0	0	0	0	0	0	0
5	DF	(Republic of Ireland) Rob Cornwall	0	0	0	0	0	0	0	0	0	0	0	0
6	MF	(England) Jordan Flores	11	0	0	0	0	0	0	0	0	11	0	0
7	MF	(Scotland) Declan McDaid	4	0	0	0	0	0	0	0	0	4	0	0
8	MF	(Republic of Ireland) Dayle Rooney	5	0	0	0	0	0	0	0	0	5	0	0
9	FW	(Poland) Filip Piszczek	9	0	0	1	0	0	0	0	0	9	0	0
10	MF	(Republic of Ireland) Dawson Devoy	6	0	0	2	0	0	0	0	0	8	0	0
11	FW	(England) James Akintunde	1	0	0	1	0	0	0	0	0	2	0	0
12	DF	(Republic of Ireland) Danny Grant	6	0	0	0	0	0	0	0	0	6	0	0
13	DF	(Republic of Ireland) Divin Isamala	0	0	0	0	0	0	0	0	0	0	0	0
14	MF	(Republic of Ireland) James McManus	2	0	0	0	0	0	0	0	0	2	0	0
15	MF	(Republic of Ireland) James Clarke	7	0	0	0	0	0	0	0	0	7	0	0
16	MF	(Republic of Ireland) Keith Buckley	0	0	0	0	0	0	0	0	0	0	0	0
17	MF	(Republic of Ireland) Adam McDonnell	7	0	0	0	0	0	0	0	0	7	0	0
18	MF	(Republic of Ireland) Brian McManus	2	0	0	0	0	0	0	0	0	2	0	0
19	MF	(Estonia) Martin Miller	3	0	0	0	0	0	0	0	0	2	0	0
20	DF	(Republic of Ireland) Leigh Kavanagh	2	1	0	0	0	0	0	0	0	2	1	0
21	FW	(New Zealand) Alex Greive	0	0	0	1	0	0	0	0	0	1	0	0
22	MF	(Republic of Ireland) Rhys Brennan	0	0	0	0	0	0	0	0	0	0	0	0
23	MF	(Scotland) Archie Meekison	1	0	0	0	0	0	0	0	0	1	0	0
24	DF	(Republic of Ireland) Cian Byrne	7	0	0	0	0	0	0	0	0	7	0	0
26	MF	(Republic of Ireland) Ross Tierney	2	1	0	1	0	0	0	0	0	3	1	0
27	MF	(Republic of Ireland) Billy Gilmore	0	0	0	0	0	0	0	0	0	0	0	0
28	MF	(Republic of Ireland) Sean Moore	0	0	0	0	0	0	0	0	0	0	0	0
29	FW	(Republic of Ireland) Nickson Okosun	1	0	0	0	0	0	0	0	0	1	0	0
30	GK	(Poland) Kacper Chorążka	1	0	0	0	0	0	0	0	0	1	0	0
31	DF	(Republic of Ireland) Declan Osagie	0	0	0	0	0	0	0	0	0	0	0	0
33	DF	(Republic of Ireland) Jake Carroll	1	0	0	0	0	0	0	0	0	1	0	0
35	GK	(Republic of Ireland) Joe Collins	0	0	0	0	0	0	0	0	0	0	0	0
36	MF	(Republic of Ireland) Christopher Conlon	0	0	0	0	0	0	0	0	0	0	0	0
38	DF	(Republic of Ireland) Jevon Mills	4	0	0	0	0	0	0	0	0	4	0	0
40	GK	(Republic of Ireland) Rian Hogan	0	0	0	0	0	0	0	0	0	0	0	0
–	ST	(Republic of Ireland) Chris Lotefa	0	0	0	0	0	0	0	0	0	0	0	0
–	DF	(Republic of Ireland) Finn Cowper Gray	0	0	0	0	0	0	0	0	0	0	0	0
–	DF	(Republic of Ireland) Josh Lyons	0	0	0	0	0	0	1	0	0	1	0	0
–	DF	(Republic of Ireland) Pharrel Manuel	0	0	0	0	0	0	0	0	0	0	0	0
–	MF	(Republic of Ireland) Victor Lace	0	0	0	0	0	0	0	0	0	0	0	0
–	MF	(Republic of Ireland) Jake Hough	0	0	0	0	0	0	0	0	0	0	0	0
–	MF	(Republic of Ireland) Hugh Smith	0	0	0	0	0	0	0	0	0	0	0	0
–	FW	(Republic of Ireland) Onesime Tembe	0	0	0	0	0	0	0	0	0	0	0	0
–	FW	(Republic of Ireland) Taylor Mooney	0	0	0	0	0	0	0	0	0	0	0	0
–	DF	(Republic of Ireland) Sean McCarthy	0	0	0	0	0	0	0	0	0	0	0	0
–	DF	(Republic of Ireland) Callum Doyle-Travers	0	0	0	0	0	0	0	0	0	0	0	0
–	MF	(Republic of Ireland) Shane Tracey	0	0	0	0	0	0	0	0	0	0	0	0
Players left club during season
2	DF	(Poland) Bartlomiej Kukulowicz	0	0	0	0	0	0	0	0	0	0	0	0
4	DF	(United States) Aboubacar Keita	4	0	0	0	0	0	0	0	0	4	0	0
10	MF	(Republic of Ireland) Dylan Connolly	4	0	0	0	0	0	0	0	0	4	0	0
20	FW	(Estonia) Sten Reinkort	0	0	0	0	0	0	0	0	0	0	0	0
25	GK	(United States) Luke Dennison	0	0	0	0	0	0	0	0	0	0	0	0
27	DF	(Estonia) Michael Lilander	1	0	0	0	0	0	0	0	0	1	0	0
41	DF	(England) Luke Matheson	0	0	0	0	0	0	0	0	0	0	0	0
Total			88	2	0	6	0	0	1	0	0	95	2	0

=== Captains ===
No.	Pos.	Player	No. Games	Notes
6	MF	(England) Jordan Flores	31	Vice captain
17	MF	(Republic of Ireland) Adam McDonnell	7	3rd captain
27	MF	(Republic of Ireland) Billy Gilmore	2	
3	DF	(Republic of Ireland) Paddy Kirk	1	
–	DF	(Republic of Ireland) Josh Lyons	1	
Player left club during season
10	MF	(Republic of Ireland) Dylan Connolly	1	

Last updated: 2 November 2024.
Source: Competitions

== International call-ups ==
=== Estonia National Team ===
Player	Fixture	Date	Location	Event
Martin Miller	vs. Switzerland	4 June 2024	Lucerne, Switzerland	Friendly
Martin Miller	vs. Faroe Islands	8 June 2024	Tallinn, Estonia	2024 Baltic Cup
Martin Miller	vs. Lithuania	11 June 2024	Kaunas, Lithuania	2024 Baltic Cup
Martin Miller	vs. (Slovenia) Slovakia	5 September 2024	Tallinn, Estonia	UEFA Nations League
Martin Miller	vs. Azerbaijan	11 October 2024	Tallinn, Estonia	UEFA Nations League
Martin Miller	vs. Sweden	14 October 2024	Tallinn, Estonia	UEFA Nations League
Michael Lilander	vs. Switzerland	4 June 2024	Lucerne, Switzerland	Friendly
Michael Lilander	vs. Faroe Islands	8 June 2024	Tallinn, Estonia	2024 Baltic Cup
Michael Lilander	vs. Lithuania	11 June 2024	Kaunas, Lithuania	2024 Baltic Cup

=== Republic of Ireland Under 19 National Team ===
Player	Fixture	Date	Location	Event
James McManus	vs. Slovakia	23 March 2024	Dunajská Streda, Slovakia	Friendly
James McManus	vs. Slovakia	26 March 2024	Dunajská Streda, Slovakia	Friendly
Rhys Brennan	vs. Slovakia	23 March 2024	Dunajská Streda, Slovakia	Friendly
Rhys Brennan	vs. Slovakia	26 March 2024	Dunajská Streda, Slovakia	Friendly
Declan Osagie	vs. France	5 September 2024	Ljubljana, Slovenia	Friendly
Declan Osagie	vs. Kazakhstan	7 September 2024	Ljubljana, Slovenia	Friendly
Declan Osagie	vs. Slovenia	10 September 2024	Ljubljana, Slovenia	Friendly
Nickson Okosun	vs. Greece	10 October 2024	Zadar, Croatia	Friendly
Nickson Okosun	vs. Croatia	12 October 2024	Zadar, Croatia	Friendly
Nickson Okosun	vs. Mexico	14 October 2024	Zadar, Croatia	Friendly

=== Latvia Under 19 National Team ===
Player	Fixture	Date	Location	Event
Markuss Strods	vs. North Macedonia	9 October 2024	Differdange, Luxembourg	2025 UEFA European Under-19 Championship qualification
Markuss Strods	vs. Luxembourg	12 October 2024	Differdange, Luxembourg	2025 UEFA European Under-19 Championship qualification
Markuss Strods	vs. Slovakia	15 October 2024	Bascharage, Luxembourg	2025 UEFA European Under-19 Championship qualification

=== Republic of Ireland Under 17 National Team ===
Player	Fixture	Date	Location	Event
Joe Collins	vs. Hungary	14 February 2024	Pinatar, Spain	Friendly
Joe Collins	vs. Denmark	17 February 2024	Pinatar, Spain	Friendly
Joe Collins	vs. Portugal	20 March 2024	Braga, Portugal	2024 UEFA European Under-17 Championship qualification
Joe Collins	vs. Germany	23 March 2024	Viana do Castelo, Portugal	2024 UEFA European Under-17 Championship qualification
Joe Collins	vs. Croatia	26 March 2024	Viana do Castelo, Portugal	2024 UEFA European Under-17 Championship qualification

== Awards ==
Player	Award
Kacper Chorążka	Bohemian FC Player of the Year
