= Ross Tierney =

Irish footballer

Personal information
- Full name: Ross Tierney
- Date of birth: 6 March 2001 (age 25)
- Place of birth: Dublin, Ireland
- Height: 1.74 m (5 ft 9 in)
- Position: Midfielder

Team information
- Current team: Bohemians
- Number: 26

Youth career
- 2009–2018: St. Kevin's Boys
- 2018–2019: Bohs-SKB Academy

Senior career*
Years	Team	Apps	(Gls)
2019–2021	Bohemians	50	(9)
2022–2024	Motherwell	32	(4)
2023–2024	→ Walsall (loan)	30	(1)
2024–	Bohemians	83	(21)

International career^{‡}
2021–2022	Republic of Ireland U21	9	(2)
- * Club domestic league appearances and goals as of 22:55, 29 October 2026 (UTC) ‡ National team caps and goals as of 23:54, 27 September 2022 (UTC)

Ross Tierney is an Irish footballer who plays as a midfielder for League of Ireland Premier Division club Bohemians.

== Club career ==
=== Bohemians ===
Tierney spent his youth career with St. Kevin's Boys (which was amalgamated with Bohemians in 2018) from the age of eight. Having progressed through the Bohs-SKB U17s and U19s teams, Tierney came to prominence in the second half of the 2019 season with his displays.

He made his first-team debut in the League of Ireland Cup Quarter Final clash with Cork City in May 2019, scoring the opening goal in a 2–0 win. He struck a further three times during his rookie season, hitting the net against UCD, Dundalk and Waterford.

He made his first ever UEFA Europa Conference League appearance for Bohs against Stjarnan in July 2021 and scored his first European goal against F91 Dudelange two weeks later.

After notching seven goals and fifteen assists during the 2021 campaign, Tierney, alongside teammate Dawson Devoy and UCD's Colm Whelan, was nominated for the PFAI Young Player of the Year award.

=== Motherwell ===
On 1 December 2021, Tierney signed with Motherwell for an undisclosed fee on a three-and-a-half-year deal. He completed the move on 1 January 2022. Tierney made his debut for the club on 22 January 2022 in a Scottish Cup tie against Greenock Morton, coming off the bench in the 76th minute and winning a penalty as his side won 2–1 in extra time. His first goal for Motherwell came on 1 February where he netted a 92nd-minute equaliser in a 1–1 draw against St Mirren. His second goal came at home to Rangers.

==== Walsall loan ====
On 24 July 2023, Tierney joined EFL League Two side Walsall on a season-long loan deal. Tierney scored his first goal for Walsall against Blackburn Rovers in a Carabao Cup tie on 8 August 2023.

=== Return to Bohemians ===
On 20 June 2024, Tierney returned to Bohemians on a multi-year contract for an undisclosed fee.

== International career ==
On 29 May 2021, Tierney was called up to the Republic of Ireland Under-21s squad. He made his debut in a friendly against the Australia U23s on 2 June 2021, coming off the bench to score a last-minute winner with his first touch. On 29 March 2022, he opened the scoring in a 2–0 win away to Sweden U21 in the 2023 UEFA European Under-21 Championship qualifiers, on his 7th cap for the U21s.

== Style of play ==
Despite his small stature, Tierney has been praised for his skill, footballing IQ, and courage by many news outlets.

== Career statistics ==
As of match played on 23 October 2026

Club	Season	League			National Cup (Note: Includes FAI Cup, Scottish Cup & FA Cup)		League Cup (Note: Includes League of Ireland Cup, Scottish League Cup & EFL Cup)		Europe		Other		Total	
Club	Season	Division	Apps	Goals	Apps	Goals	Apps	Goals	Apps	Goals	Apps	Goals	Apps	Goals
Bohemians	2019	LOI Premier Division	8	2	4	0	2	2	–		2 (Note: 1 appearance in the Leinster Senior Cup; 1 appearance in the Scottish Challenge Cup)	0	16	4
Bohemians	2020	LOI Premier Division	8	0	1	0	–		0 (Note: Appearance(s) in the UEFA Europa League)	0	–		9	0
Bohemians	2021	LOI Premier Division	34	7	3	0	–		6 (Note: Appearance(s) in UEFA Europa Conference League)	2	–		43	9
Bohemians	Total		50	9	8	0	2	2	6	2	2	0	68	13
Motherwell	2021–22	Scottish Premiership	14	2	1	0	–		–		–		15	2
Motherwell	2022–23	Scottish Premiership	18	2	1	0	2	0	2	0	1 (Note: Appearance(s) in Scottish Challenge Cup)	0	24	2
Motherwell	Total		32	4	2	0	2	0	2	0	1	0	39	4
Walsall (loan)	2023–24	League Two	30	1	2	1	1	1	–		2 (Note: Appearance(s) in the EFL Trophy)	0	35	3
Bohemians	2024	LOI Premier Division	13	3	4	2	–		–		–		17	5
Bohemians	2025	LOI Premier Division	35	7	1	0	–		–		1 (Note: Appearance(s) in the Leinster Senior Cup)	2	37	9
Bohemians	2026	LOI Premier Division	35	11	3	0	–		6 (Note: Appearances in the UEFA Conference League)	1	0	0	44	12
Bohemians	Total		83	21	8	2	–		6	1	1	2	98	26
Career total			195	35	20	3	5	3	14	3	6	2	240	47
