= Archie Meekison =

Scottish footballer

Personal information
- Full name: Archie Alexander Meekison
- Date of birth: 4 May 2002 (age 24)
- Place of birth: Edinburgh, Scotland
- Height: 5 ft 10 in (1.78 m)
- Position: Midfielder

Team information
- Current team: Cork City

Youth career
- Kennoway United
- AM Soccer
- 2009–2020: Dundee United

Senior career*
Years	Team	Apps	(Gls)
2020–2024	Dundee United	19	(1)
2020	→ Cove Rangers (loan)	3	(0)
2020–2021	→ The Spartans (loan)	12	(4)
2023	→ Falkirk (loan)	1	(0)
2024–2025	Bohemians	29	(4)
2026	Sligo Rovers	28	(2)
2027–	Cork City	0	(0)
- * Club domestic league appearances and goals as of 19:50, 2 November 2026 (UTC)

Archie Alexander Meekison (born 4 May 2002) is a Scottish professional footballer who plays as a midfielder for League of Ireland Premier Division club Cork City.

== Early life ==
Meekison was born in Edinburgh on 4 May 2002. He played youth football in Fife for Kennoway United and AM Soccer. He attended St John's Roman Catholic High School in Dundee as part of the Scottish Football Association's Performance School Programme.

== Club career ==
Meekison signed his first professional contract with Dundee United in May 2019, having been attached to the club's youth academy for ten years. In February 2020, he joined Scottish League Two club Cove Rangers on loan until the end of the 2019–20 season, making his senior debut as a substitute in a win over Stenhousemuir. He made three substitute appearances for Cove before the season was ended early due to the COVID-19 pandemic. With both Dundee United and Cove being declared winners of their respective divisions, Meekison was connected with two title-winning teams that season.

In September 2020, Meekison went on loan again, joining Lowland League club The Spartans. He was recalled by Dundee United in January 2021 after the pandemic caused another suspension of lower league football. He scored eight goals for Spartans during his loan, including a hat-trick against East Stirlingshire in the South Region Challenge Cup.

Meekison made his first team debut for Dundee United on 21 April 2021, as a substitute in a 3–0 Scottish Premiership defeat against Kilmarnock at Rugby Park. This made him the second AM Soccer graduate to play in the Premiership after his United teammate Louis Appéré, who was also playing in the match. On 12 May 2021, he made his first start for Dundee United and scored his first goal for the club in a 2–2 draw at home against Motherwell.

On 26 January 2023, Meekison joined Scottish League One club Falkirk on loan until the end of the season.

On 1 July 2024, Meekison joined League of Ireland Premier Division club Bohemians on a multi-year contract.

On 4 November 2025, it was announced that he had signed a pre-contract agreement to join fellow League of Ireland Premier Division club Sligo Rovers.

Following Sligo's relegation, it was announced on 3 November 2026, that Meekison would be joining newly promoted League of Ireland Premier Division club Cork City ahead of the 2027 season.

== International career ==
Meekison represented the Scottish Schoolboys team in the 2019 Centenary Shield competition.

He was selected for the Scotland under-21 squad in May 2022 but was not capped.

== Career statistics ==
As of match played 30 October 2026

Appearances and goals by club, season and competition
Club	Season	League			National cup (Note: Includes Scottish Cup, FAI Cup)		League cup (Note: Includes Scottish League Cup)		Continental		Other		Total	
Club	Season	Division	Apps	Goals	Apps	Goals	Apps	Goals	Apps	Goals	Apps	Goals	Apps	Goals
Dundee United	2018–19	Scottish Championship	0	0	0	0	0	0	—		0 (Note: Appearance(s) in the Scottish Challenge Cup)	0	0	0
Dundee United	2019–20	Scottish Championship	0	0	0	0	0	0	—		0	0	0	0
Dundee United	2020–21	Scottish Premiership	3	1	0	0	0	0	—		—		3	1
Dundee United	2021–22	Scottish Premiership	9	0	2	0	1	0	—		—		12	0
Dundee United	2022–23	Scottish Premiership	7	0	0	0	0	0	1 (Note: Appearance(s) in the UEFA Europa Conference League)	0	—		8	0
Dundee United	2023–24	Scottish Championship	12	0	0	0	4	0	—		0	0	16	0
Dundee United	Total		31	1	2	0	5	0	1	0	0	0	39	1
Dundee United B	2022–23	—			—		—		—		1	0	1	0
Cove Rangers (loan)	2019–20	Scottish League Two	3	0	0	0	0	0	—		0	0	3	0
The Spartans (loan)	2020–21	Lowland Football League	12	4	2	0	—		—		2 (Note: Appearance(s) in the SFA South Region Challenge Cup)	4	16	8
Falkirk (loan)	2022–23	Scottish League One	1	0	0	0	—		—		—		1	0
Bohemians	2024	LOI Premier Division	11	2	2	0	—		—		—		13	2
Bohemians	2025	LOI Premier Division	18	2	0	0	—		—		1 (Note: Appearance(s) in the Leinster Senior Cup)	0	19	2
Bohemians	Total		29	4	2	0	–		–		1	0	32	4
Sligo Rovers	2026	LOI Premier Division	28	2	3	1	—		—		—		31	3
Career total			104	11	9	1	5	0	1	0	4	4	123	16
