= Katlego Mashigo =

South African soccer player

Personal information
- Date of birth: 22 January 2001 (age 25)
- Place of birth: Soshanguve, South Africa
- Position: Midfielder

Team information
- Current team: Kilbarrack United

Youth career
- Phoenix
- –2017: St Kevin's Boys
- 2017–2019: Fleetwood Town

Senior career*
| Years | Team | Apps | (Gls) |
| 2019–2020 | Bohemians | 0 | (0) |
| 2021 | Waterford | 6 | (0) |
| 2021 | Athlone Town | 0 | (0) |
| 2022–2023 | Portadown | 16 | (0) |
| 2023 | Finn Harps | 17 | (0) |
| 2023–2024 | Tolka Rovers | | |
| 2024 | Des Moines Menace | | |
| 2024–2025 | Tolka Rovers | 21 | (1) |
| 2025– | Kilbarrack United | 20 | (0) |

International career
| 2022 | South Africa | 1 | (0) |
- * Club domestic league appearances and goals as of 22 July 2026

Katlego Mashigo (born 22 January 2001) is a South African soccer player who plays as a midfielder for Leinster Senior League club Kilbarrack United.

== Career ==
As a youth player, Mashigo joined the youth academy of Irish side St. Kevin's Boys. In 2017, he joined the youth academy of Fleetwood Town in the English third tier. In 2019, he signed for Irish top flight club Bohemians.

In 2021, Mashigo signed for Athlone Town in the Irish second tier. Before the second half of 2021–22, he signed for Northern Irish team Portadown.

On 1 February 2023, Mashigo joined League of Ireland First Division club Finn Harps.
