= James Clarke (footballer, born 2001) =

Irish footballer

Personal information
- Date of birth: 8 January 2001 (age 25)
- Place of birth: Ballivor, County Meath, Ireland
- Positions: Midfielder; forward

Team information
- Current team: Derry City
- Number: 15

Youth career
- –2016: Belvedere
- 2016–2018: Cherry Orchard
- 2018–2019: Shamrock Rovers
- 2019–2020: Drogheda United

Senior career*
Years	Team	Apps	(Gls)
2020–2022	Drogheda United	49	(2)
2022–2025	Bohemians	108	(18)
2026–	Derry City	30	(7)
- * Club domestic league appearances and goals as of 11:35, 16 October 2025 (UTC)

James Clarke (born 21 January 2001) is an Irish professional footballer who plays as a midfielder for League of Ireland Premier Division club Derry City.

== Career ==
=== Early career ===
A native of Ballivor, County Meath, Clarke began his schoolboy playing career with Belvedere and Cherry Orchard before moving up to play at Under 19 level for Shamrock Rovers and Drogheda United.

=== Drogheda United ===
On 1 July 2019, Clarke signed his first professional contract with Drogheda United, graduating from the Under 19 set up. The midfielder would nail down a starting place under boss Tim Clancy and later Kevin Doherty.

=== Bohemians ===
In July 2022, Clarke joined Bohemians for an undisclosed fee. He made his full league debut against Sligo Rovers at The Showgrounds. Clarke would net his first goal for Bohs in September against UCD.

=== Derry City ===
On 18 December 2025, Derry City announced that Clarke had joined the club on a free transfer ahead of the 2026 season, signing a three-year contract. On 8 November 2026, he was part of the starting XI in a 1–0 win over Waterford in the 2026 FAI Cup final at the Aviva Stadium.

== Personal life ==
Clarke holds a degree in law from Maynooth University.

== Career statistics ==
As of match played on 8 November 2026

Appearances and goals by club, season and competition
Club	Season	League			National Cup (Note: Includes FAI Cup)		Other		Total	
Club	Season	Division	Apps	Goals	Apps	Goals	Apps	Goals	Apps	Goals
Drogheda United	2020	LOI First Division	15	1	0	0	–		15	1
Drogheda United	2021	LOI Premier Division	24	1	1	0	–		25	1
Drogheda United	2022	LOI Premier Division	23	1	–		–		23	1
Drogheda United	Total		62	3	1	0	–		63	3
Bohemians	2022	LOI Premier Division	13	3	3	0	–		13	3
Bohemians	2023	LOI Premier Division	32	5	5	2	2 (Note: Appearance(s) in the Leinster Senior Cup)	0	39	7
Bohemians	2024	LOI Premier Division	34	4	4	1	0	0	38	5
Bohemians	2025	LOI Premier Division	33	8	0	0	1	0	34	8
Bohemians	Total		112	20	12	3	3	0	127	23
Derry City	2026	LOI Premier Division	30	7	4	0	3	0	37	7
Career total			204	30	17	3	6	0	226	33

== Honours ==
=== Club ===
Drogheda United

- League of Ireland First Division: 2020

Derry City

- FAI Cup: 2026

=== Individual ===
- League of Ireland Player of the Month: August 2023
- PFAI Team of the Year: 2023
