= Niall Morahan =

Irish footballer (born 2000)

Personal information
- Full name: Niall Morahan
- Date of birth: 30 May 2000 (age 26)
- Place of birth: Leitrim, Ireland
- Height: 1.76 m (5 ft 9 in)
- Positions: Midfielder; defender

Team information
- Current team: Bohemians
- Number: 4

Youth career
- Carrick Town
- –2015: Strand Celtic
- 2015–2018: Sligo Rovers

Senior career*
Years	Team	Apps	(Gls)
2018–2024	Sligo Rovers	172	(4)
2025–2026	Bohemians	58	(1)

International career^{‡}
2019	Republic of Ireland U19	2	(0)
- * Club domestic league appearances and goals as of 16:37, 9 November 2026 (UTC) ‡ National team caps and goals as of 12:30, 16 January 2025 (UTC)

Niall Morahan (born 30 May 2000) is an Irish professional footballer who plays as a midfielder or defender for League of Ireland Premier Division club Cork City, having previously played for Sligo Rovers and Bohemians.

== Career ==
=== Youth career ===
Morahan is a native of Leitrim village, County Leitrim and began playing football with Carrick Town and then Strand Celtic, before undergoing a successful trial with the academy of League of Ireland club Sligo Rovers in 2015. He spent 3 seasons with their under 17 side, before progressing on to the under 19 side for the 2018 season.

=== Sligo Rovers ===
On 18 August 2018, Morahan made his senior debut for Sligo Rovers, replacing Kris Twardek from the bench in injury time of a 3–1 win away to Limerick at the Markets Field. He made 4 further appearances in 2018, before impressing in pre-season and becoming a first team regular during the 2019 season, featuring 27 times in all competitions during the year. He scored the first senior of his career on 8 March 2020 in a 3–2 loss to Shamrock Rovers at The Showgrounds. In July 2021, Morahan made the first European appearances of his career, when Sligo faced FH of Iceland in the UEFA Europa Conference League. On 29 November 2021, Morahan signed a 2-year contract with the club. Morahan featured in all 6 of the club's games during their European run in the summer of 2022, as they knocked out Bala Town of Wales and Motherwell of Scotland before being knocked out by Viking from Norway. On 5 December 2023, he signed a new 1-year contract with the club. Morahan was made club captain ahead of the 2024 season. At the end of the 2024 season, Morahan left the club after 190 appearances and 4 goals over 7 seasons.

=== Bohemians ===
On 14 November 2024, Morahan signed for League of Ireland Premier Division club Bohemians ahead of their 2025 season.

=== Cork City ===
On 21 November 2026, it was announced that Morahan would be joining newly promoted Cork City ahead of the 2027 season.

== International career ==
Morahan featured twice for the Republic of Ireland U19 team in February 2019, before receiving his first call up to the Republic of Ireland U21 side in October 2021, but was not capped.

== Career statistics ==
As of match played on 30 October 2026

Appearances and goals by club, season and competition
Club	Season	League			National Cup (Note: Includes FAI Cup)		League Cup (Note: Includes League of Ireland Cup)		Europe		Other		Total	
Club	Season	Division	Apps	Goals	Apps	Goals	Apps	Goals	Apps	Goals	Apps	Goals	Apps	Goals
Sligo Rovers	2018	LOI Premier Division	4	0	0	0	0	0	–		1 (Note: Appearance(s) in the Scottish Challenge Cup)	0	5	0
Sligo Rovers	2019	LOI Premier Division	25	0	1	0	1	0	–		–		27	0
Sligo Rovers	2020	LOI Premier Division	17	1	2	0	–		–		–		19	1
Sligo Rovers	2021	LOI Premier Division	31	1	1	0	–		2 (Note: Appearance(s) in the UEFA Europa Conference League)	0	–		34	0
Sligo Rovers	2022	LOI Premier Division	27	0	1	0	–		6	0	–		34	0
Sligo Rovers	2023	LOI Premier Division	33	1	1	0	–		–		–		34	1
Sligo Rovers	2024	LOI Premier Division	35	1	2	0	–		–		–		37	1
Sligo Rovers	Total		172	4	8	0	1	0	8	0	1	0	190	4
Bohemians	2025	LOI Premier Division	35	1	2	0	–		–		1 (Note: Appearance(s) in the Leinster Senior Cup)	0	38	1
Bohemians	2026	LOI Premier Division	23	0	2	0	–		3 (Note: Appearance(s) in the UEFA Conference League)	0	0	0	28	0
Bohemians	Total		58	1	4	0	–		3	0	1	0	66	1
Cork City	2027	LOI Premier Division	0	0	0	0	–		–		0 (Note: Appearance(s) in the Munster Senior Cup)	0	0	0
Career total			230	5	12	0	1	0	11	0	2	0	256	5
