= Rhys Brennan =

Irish footballer

Personal information
- Full name: Rhys Brennan
- Date of birth: 15 June 2006 (age 20)
- Place of birth: Inchicore, Dublin, Ireland
- Position: Winger

Team information
- Current team: Linfield (on loan from Bohemians)
- Number: 19

Youth career
- Lourdes Celtic
- –2018: Crumlin United
- 2018–2022: Shelbourne
- 2022–2023: Crumlin United
- 2023–: Bohemians

Senior career*
Years	Team	Apps	(Gls)
2024–	Bohemians	18	(1)
2026	→ Cobh Ramblers (loan)	22	(2)
2026–	→ Linfield (loan)	0	(0)

International career^{‡}
2024	Republic of Ireland U19	1	(0)
- * Club domestic league appearances and goals as of 15:01, 31 August 2026 (UTC) ‡ National team caps and goals as of 11:20, 31 August 2026 (UTC)

Rhys Brennan (born 15 June 2006) is an Irish professional footballer who plays as a winger for NIFL Premiership club Linfield, on loan from League of Ireland Premier Division club Bohemians.

== Career ==
=== Youth career ===
Brennan is a native of Inchicore and grew up a St Patrick's Athletic fan, attending games at Richmond Park with friends. He began playing football with Lourdes Celtic before moving to Crumlin United, then Shelbourne from under-13 to under-17 level, then back to Crumlin United, before signing for the under-20 side of Bohemians in December 2023, where soon after signing he suffered a fractured ankle.

=== Bohemians ===
On 22 January 2024, he made his senior debut for Bohemians in a 3–1 loss away to Drogheda United in the Leinster Senior Cup in a game in which his club opted to field their entire under-20s side. He scored his first goal at senior level in the same competition 6 days later in a 1–0 win away to Malahide United. Brennan signed his first professional contract with the club on 18 June 2024. On 25 October 2024, he made his League of Ireland Premier Division debut in a 1–1 draw away to Waterford at the RSC after replacing Danny Grant from the bench for the last 25 minutes of the game. On 21 April 2025, Brennan scored the first senior league goal of his career with a 96th-minute winner away to Shamrock Rovers in the Dublin Derby at Tallaght Stadium, having replacing Connor Parsons from the bench in the 52nd minute with his side 2–0 down at the time, his goal earned them a dramatic late 3–2 victory.

==== Cobh Ramblers loan ====
On 12 February 2026, Brennan signed for League of Ireland First Division club Cobh Ramblers on a season-long loan. On 15 July 2026, it was announced that his loan had been cut short after scoring 2 goals and providing 5 assists in 22 appearances during his loan spell.

==== Linfield loan ====
On 31 August 2026, Brennan signed for NIFL Premiership club Linfield until the end of the 2026–27 season.

== International career ==
In March 2024, he received his first international call up, for the Republic of Ireland U19 team. On 26 March 2024, he made his international debut for the side in a 3–1 victory away to Slovakia U19 in a friendly in Dunajská Streda.

== Career statistics ==
As of match played on 29 May 2026

Appearances and goals by club, season and competition
Club	Season	League			National Cup (Note: Includes FAI Cup & Irish Cup)		League Cup (Note: Includes Northern Ireland Football League Cup)		Other		Total	
Club	Season	Division	Apps	Goals	Apps	Goals	Apps	Goals	Apps	Goals	Apps	Goals
Bohemians	2024	LOI Premier Division	1	0	0	0	–		3 (Note: Appearance(s) in the Leinster Senior Cup)	1	4	1
Bohemians	2025	LOI Premier Division	17	1	2	1	–		1	1	20	3
Bohemians	2026	LOI Premier Division	0	0	0	0	–		2	0	2	0
Bohemians	Total		18	1	2	1	–		6	2	26	3
Cobh Ramblers (loan)	2026	LOI Premier Division	22	2	–		–		0 (Note: Appearance(s) in the Munster Senior Cup)	0	22	2
Linfield (loan)	2026–27	NIFL Premiership	0	0	0	0	0	0	0 (Note: Appearance(s) in the County Antrim Shield)	0	0	0
Career Total			40	3	2	1	0	0	6	2	48	5
