= St. Kevin's Boys F.C. =

St. Kevin's
- Full name: Saint Kevin's Football Club
- Nickname: St. Kevin's Boys
- Short name: Kevin's; SKB; SKFC
- Founded: 1959; 67 years ago
- Ground: Shanowen Road
- Coordinates: 53.3888°N 6.2504°W
- League: Leinster Senior League
- Website: stkfc.ie
Home colours

St. Kevin's Football Club is an association football club originally based in Whitehall, Dublin. The club has since spread its reach across multiple locations in Dublin 9 and The Ward, County Dublin. The club fields more than 40 schoolboy teams who play in the Dublin District Schoolboys League. At senior level, the club fields two sides who play in the Leinster Senior League. The club name was changed from St. Kevin’s Boys Club in 2023 with the introduction of a girls football section for the first time.

The club uses three playing facilities in Whitehall (at Ellenfield Park, at Larkhill Road and at St. Aidan's CBS), one in Santry (at Shanowen Road) and one in Ward (at Ward Cross). Other locations include the Royal College of Surgeons' Sports Grounds in Dardistown, Hampstead Park in Glasnevin and Coolgreena Road in Beaumont.

As of 2024, St. Kevin's are strategic partners with Bohemian F.C.

== History ==
=== Foundation and development ===
Founded in 1959, by Fr. Des Williams, as St. Kevin's Boys Club, there was originally just one association football team at the club. By the mid-sixties, the club had both senior and underage teams who were challenging for trophies in the Amateur Football League (AFL) and the Dublin District Schoolboys League (DDSL).

The club grew into one of the biggest schoolboy clubs in the country, with a number of players progressing on to full time careers in England, and representing the Republic of Ireland side at international level. Playing in Ellenfield Park, beside Whitehall Church. In 1984 the club built the clubhouse and hall in Larkhill. In the 2000s, the club developed an all-weather pitch on Shanowen Road, adjacent to their clubhouse in Larkhill.

=== Academy cup ===
To commemorate their 50th year, in 2009, the club started the invitational annual St. Kevins Boys Club Academy Cup, which has hosted youth sides (under-13) from many of the best sides in Europe. Academy sides from Ajax, Arsenal, Benfica, Barcelona, Celtic, Deportivo La Coruna, Borussia Dortmund, Genk, Bayer Leverkusen, Olympique Lyonnais, Real Madrid, and West Bromwich Albion have participated in the competition over the years.

=== Intermediate football ===
On 31 May 2016, St. Kevin's first team played their last senior game in the Athletic Union League (AUL), having decided to move to the Leinster Senior League for the 2016–17 season.

On 13 September 2016, the club's new 7,650 m^{2} (82,300 sq ft) floodlit all-weather pitch, located at St Aidan's School, was opened by President Michael D Higgins.

In August 2019, the club completed an upgrade to the 891 sq/m artificial turf pitch at Shanowen Road. In June 2025, another all-weather pitch was developed on Larkhill Road.

=== Bohemians & national underage leagues ===
The introduction of new national underage leagues by the Football Association of Ireland (FAI) in 2017 dramatically altered the landscape for underage football. By November 2017, St. Kevin's Boys had entered into a five-year deal with Bohemians. The arrangement would see the two clubs enter joint teams into the Under-13 and Under-15 national leagues after a compensation agreement was reached. This followed similar partnerships agreed between League of Ireland clubs and schoolboy clubs in advance of the first full national Under-15 league season beginning in March 2018. The arrangement extended to the Under-13 league when the season commenced in March 2019. By 2020, the partnership had extended to the Under-17s with the joint team labelled 'Bohs-SKB'. In July 2022, Bohemians notified St. Kevin's that they would end their exclusive partnership when the deal expired in 2023. In February 2024, the clubs announced a new deal covering their Under-13 and Under-14 teams.

=== Modern era ===
In April 2024, St. Kevin's won the FAI Youth Cup for the first time in their history. They beat Pike Rovers 3–0 at Whitehall Stadium to secure the 2023–24 title. In July 2026, the club announced that they would not enter a team in the Leinster Senior League for the 2026–27 season.

== Grounds ==
The club's senior team play their Leinster Senior League matches at St. Aidan's.

== Notable former players ==
=== Internationals ===
Republic of Ireland internationals

- (Republic of Ireland) Liam Brady
- (Republic of Ireland) Robbie Brady
- (Republic of Ireland) Jack Byrne
- (Republic of Ireland) Stephen Carr
- (Republic of Ireland) Damien Duff
- (Republic of Ireland) Jimmy Dunne
- (Republic of Ireland) Evan Ferguson
- (Republic of Ireland) Ian Harte
- (Republic of Ireland) Jeff Hendrick
- (Republic of Ireland) Alan Maybury
- (Republic of Ireland) Dara O'Shea
- (Republic of Ireland) Killian Phillips

Republic of Ireland U21 internationals

- (Republic of Ireland) Tayo Adaramola
- (Republic of Ireland) Darragh Burns
- (Republic of Ireland) Trevor Clarke
- (Republic of Ireland) Sam Curtis
- (Republic of Ireland) Dawson Devoy
- (Republic of Ireland) Ronan Finn
- (Republic of Ireland) Rene Gilmartin
- (Republic of Ireland) Seán Grehan
- (Republic of Ireland) Gavin Kilkenny
- (Republic of Ireland) Danny Mandroiu
- (Republic of Ireland) Karl Moore
- (Republic of Ireland) Jamie Mullins
- (Republic of Ireland) Michael O'Connor
- (Republic of Ireland) Alex O'Hanlon
- (Republic of Ireland) Ross Tierney

Republic of Ireland U19 internationals

- (Republic of Ireland) Anthony Breslin
- (Republic of Ireland) Ryan Cassidy
- (Republic of Ireland) John Ryan
- (Republic of Ireland) Eoghan Stokes

Republic of Ireland U17 internationals

- (Republic of Ireland) Luke Wade-Slater

=== Others ===
- (South Africa) Katlego Mashigo
- (Republic of Ireland) Josh O'Hanlon
- (Republic of Ireland) Kyle Robinson
- (Republic of Ireland) Dayle Rooney
- (Turkey) Emre Topçu

== See also ==
- Saint Kevin
