= 2017–18 Leinster Senior Cup =

2018 Leinster Senior Cup
Leinster Football Association Senior Cup

Tournament details
- Country: Ireland

Final positions
- Champions: Shelbourne
- Runners-up: St Patrick's Athletic

The 2018 Leinster Senior Cup was the 117th staging of the Leinster Football Association's primary competition. It included all Leinster based League of Ireland clubs from the First Division and Premier Division, as well as a selection of intermediate level sides. The competition was won by Shelbourne

== Third round ==
| 21 January 2018 | North End United | 1-2 | St Mochta’s |

| 24 January 2018 | Bangor Celtic | 1-0 | Mullingar Athletic |

| 25 January 2018 | Crumlin United | 1-2 | Cherry Orchard |

| 17 February 2018 | Bluebell United | 3-2 | Usher Celtic |

== Fourth round ==
The 12 Leinster teams from the League of Ireland join the competition in this round.

| Bray Wanderers | 1-3 | St Patrick’s Athletic |

| Shamrock Rovers | 2-1 | St Mochta’s |

| Drogheda United | 0-0 | Bangor Celtic |

| Athlone Town | 0-1 | Shelbourne |

| UCD | 1-2 | Longford Town |

| Wexford | 1-3 | Cabinteely |

| Bluebell United | 3-1 | Cherry Orchard |

| Dundalk | 3-1 | Bohemians |

== Quarter-finals ==
| 29 May 2018 | Drogheda United | 0-2 | Bluebell United |

| 2 July 2018 | Shamrock Rovers | 0-1 | Dundalk |

| 9 July 2018 | St Patrick’s Athletic | 5-0 | Wexford |

| 16 July 2018 | Longford Town | 1-2 | Shelbourne |

== Semi-finals ==
| 13 August 2018 | Shelbourne | 2-0 | Bluebell United |

| 3 September 2018 | St Patrick’s Athletic | 1-0 (a.e.t.) | Dundalk |

== Final ==
| 28 September 2018 | Shelbourne | 1–1 (a.e.t.) (6-5 p) | St Patrick's Athletic | Drumcondra, Dublin |
| 19:45 GMT | Greg Moorhouse 84' | Report | Achille Campion 90+1' | Stadium: Tolka Park |
