= Dawson Devoy =

Irish footballer (born 2001)

Personal information
- Full name: Dawson Devoy
- Date of birth: 20 November 2001 (age 24)
- Place of birth: Ashbourne, County Meath, Ireland
- Height: 1.77 m (5 ft 10 in)
- Position: Midfielder

Team information
- Current team: Bohemians
- Number: 10

Youth career
- Home Farm
- St Kevin's Boys
- 2018–2019: Bohemians

Senior career*
Years	Team	Apps	(Gls)
2019–2022	Bohemians	71	(10)
2022–2024	Milton Keynes Dons	44	(0)
2024	→ Swindon Town (loan)	16	(3)
2024–	Bohemians	78	(13)

International career^{‡}
2021–2022	Republic of Ireland U21	7	(0)
2026–	Republic of Ireland	1	(0)
- * Club domestic league appearances and goals as of 00:10, 13 October 2026 (UTC) ‡ National team caps and goals as of 01:50, 6 June 2026 (UTC)

Dawson Devoy (born 20 November 2001) is an Irish professional association football player who plays as a midfielder for League of Ireland Premier Division club Bohemians. He also plays for the Republic of Ireland national team.

== Early life ==
Born in Ashbourne, County Meath in 2001, Devoy played for Home Farm and St Kevin's Boys at youth level.

== Club career ==
=== Bohemians ===
Devoy signed youth terms with the U17 side of League of Ireland Premier Division club Bohemians in March 2018, before signing professional terms in 2019. Devoy made his first team debut on 27 May 2019 as a 68th-minute substitute in a 2–0 League of Ireland Cup quarter-final win over Cork City. He made his league debut on 15 July 2019 as a 79th-minute substitute in a 3–0 defeat away to UCD.

Following limited opportunities the previous season, in 2021 Devoy featured regularly in both the league and UEFA Europa Conference League. He scored his first goal for the club on 21 May 2021 in a 2–1 defeat away to St Patrick's Athletic. After an impressive season which included an international call-up to the Republic of Ireland U21s, Devoy was named the PFAI Young Player of the Year and featured in the PFAI Team of the Year for 2021.

After re-signing with Bohemians in December 2021, he continued to perform into the 2022 season, scoring 8 goals and providing 2 assists in 22 league games amid increased interest from other clubs.

=== Milton Keynes Dons ===
On 13 July 2022, Devoy joined EFL League One club Milton Keynes Dons on a three-year deal for an undisclosed fee. On 5 November 2022, Devoy scored his first goal for the club, in a 6–0 win over Taunton Town in the FA Cup. He scored 1 goal in 44 appearances in all competitions over the season as his side were relegated to EFL League Two.

==== Swindon Town loan ====
On 5 January 2024, Devoy joined fellow League Two club Swindon Town on loan until the end of the season.

=== Return to Bohemians ===
On 16 July 2024, Devoy returned to his first senior club Bohemians on a multi-year contract. He scored 5 goals in 36 appearances in all competitions during the 2025 season, helping Bohemians to a 4th-place finish, their highest in 5 seasons.

== International career ==
Devoy made his international debut for the Republic of Ireland U21 team during the 2023 UEFA European Under-21 qualifiers against Luxembourg. Devoy was named in Heimir Hallgrímsson's Republic of Ireland senior squad to take on Canada in Montreal in June 2026. On 5 June 2026, Devoy made his debut in a 1–1 draw with Canada at the Saputo Stadium. His appearance made him the first Bohemians player to be capped for the national team since Glen Crowe in 2003.

== Career statistics ==
=== Club ===
As of match played on 12 October 2026

Appearances and goals by club, season and competition
Club	Division	Season	League		National cup		League cup		Europe		Other		Total	
Club	Division	Season	Apps	Goals	Apps	Goals	Apps	Goals	Apps	Goals	Apps	Goals	Apps	Goals
Bohemians	LOI Premier Division	2019	6	0	1	0	1	0	—		1 (Note: Appearance(s) in the Leinster Senior Cup)	0	9	0
Bohemians	LOI Premier Division	2020	10	0	2	0	—		1 (Note: Appearance(s) in the UEFA Europa League)	0	—		13	0
Bohemians	LOI Premier Division	2021	33	2	5	1	—		6 (Note: Appearance(s) in the UEFA Europa Conference League)	0	—		44	3
Bohemians	LOI Premier Division	2022	22	8	–		—		—		—		22	8
Bohemians	Total		71	10	8	1	1	0	7	0	1	0	88	11
Milton Keynes Dons	League One	2022–23	34	0	2	1	4	0	—		4 (Note: Appearance(s) in the EFL Trophy)	0	44	1
Milton Keynes Dons	League Two	2023–24	10	0	1	0	0	0	—		3	1	14	1
Milton Keynes Dons	Total		44	0	3	1	4	0	—		7	0	58	2
Swindon Town (loan)	League Two	2023–24	16	3	—		—		—		—		16	3
Bohemians	LOI Premier Division	2024	13	4	3	0	—		—		—		16	4
Bohemians	LOI Premier Division	2025	34	5	1	0	—		—		1	0	36	5
Bohemians	LOI Premier Division	2026	31	4	3	0	—		6 (Note: Appearance(s) in the UEFA Conference League)	0	0	0	40	3
Bohemians	Total		78	13	7	0	—		6	0	1	0	92	12
Career Total			209	26	18	2	5	0	13	0	9	0	254	28

=== International ===
As of match played on 5 June 2026

Appearances and goals by national team and year
National team	Year	Apps	Goals
Republic of Ireland
Republic of Ireland	2026	1	0
Total		1	0

== Honours ==
=== Individual ===
- PFAI Young Player of the Year (1): 2021
- PFAI Team of the Year (3): 2021, 2025, 2026
- League of Ireland Player of the Month (1): July 2021
