= Ellenfield Park =

Park in Dublin, Ireland

- Location within Ireland
- Location: Dublin, Ireland
- Nearest city: Dublin
- Coordinates: 53°23′8.89″N 6°14′26.41″W
- Area: 10 ha (25 acres)

Ellenfield Park (sometimes called Whitehall Park) is a public park in Whitehall, Dublin, managed by Dublin City Council's parks department.

== History ==
The park is on the land where once stood Clonturk Cottage, later renamed Ellenfield House. During The Emergency / Second World War, Ellenfield Park was used for allotments (hence the nickname of the playing fields The Plots).

Dublin Corporation developed the Ellenfield lands as a public park in the 1950s. The park's western and northern boundaries was altered during the construction, in 1983, of the Santry Bypass (M1 Motorway). During the construction of the Dublin Port Tunnel, which started in 2001, the re-alignment of the Swords Road caused the park's north and western perimeters to be further altered.

== Access and recreation ==
The park is located in Whitehall, Dublin. It is bordered by The Church of The Holy Child (Whitehall/Larkhill), Margaret Aylward Community College, Swords Road, Shantalla Road, and Ellenfield Road.

The park has recreational facilities for soccer, Gaelic football, camogie, and tennis, as well as a children's playground. It is used by a variety of sports clubs such as St Kevin's Boys Club, and Whitehall Colmcille GAA club, and by Holy Child National School for sports.

A number of tennis courts were developed as an all weather pitch with floodlights, leaving 3 tennis courts.There are 3 boules (Pétanque) courts.There is also a small basketball court and Water bottle refill station.
