= 2016–17 Leinster Senior Cup =

2017 Leinster Senior Cup
Leinster Football Association Senior Cup

Tournament details
- Country: Republic of Ireland

Final positions
- Champions: Shelbourne
- Runners-up: Dundalk

The 2017 Leinster Senior Cup was the 116th staging of the Leinster Football Association's primary competition. It included all Leinster based League of Ireland clubs from the First Division and Premier Division, as well as a selection of intermediate level sides. The competition was won by Shelbourne.

== Fourth round ==
21 January 2017	Malahide United	1-2	Bohemians

31 January 2017	Bray Wanderers	0-4	St Patrick's Athletic

9 February 2017	St Patricks CYFC	2-4	Dundalk

17 February 2017	UCD	2-0	Drogheda United

17 February 2017	Shelbourne	4-2	Wexford

18 February 2017	Thomastown United	1-0	Shamrock Rovers

12 March 2017	Firhouse Clover	1-0	Longford Town

17 April 2017	Cabinteely	3-0	Athlone Town

== Quarter-finals ==
24 April 2017	Bohemians	0-3	Shelbourne

9 May 2017	UCD	2-1	Cabinteely

15 May 2017	Dundalk	6-0	Thomastown United

8 August 2017	St Patrick's Athletic	2-1	Firhouse Clover

== Semi-finals ==
28 August 2017	St Patrick's Athletic	0-1	Shelbourne

19 September 2017	UCD	5-7	Dundalk

== Final ==
4 October 2017	Dundalk	2-4 (a.e.t.)	Shelbourne
19:45
