= Jevon Mills =

Irish association footballer

Personal information
- Full name: Jevon John Mills
- Date of birth: 27 September 2003 (age 23)
- Place of birth: Nottingham, England
- Position: Centre-back

Team information
- Current team: FC Halifax Town
- Number: 16

Youth career
- 2016–2025: Hull City

Senior career*
Years	Team	Apps	(Gls)
2021–2025	Hull City	1	(0)
2022	→ Falkirk (loan)	6	(0)
2022	→ Gateshead (loan)	6	(0)
2023	→ Solihull Moors (loan)	9	(0)
2024	→ Bohemians (loan)	24	(1)
2025–2026	FC Halifax Town	16	(1)
2026–	Solihull Moors		

International career
2021	Republic of Ireland U19	2	(0)
- * Club domestic league appearances and goals as of 10:37, 10 September 2025 (UTC)

Jevon John Mills (born 27 September 2003) is a professional footballer who plays for FC Halifax Town.

== Career ==
Mills is youth product of Hull City, having joined as a U13. He signed his first professional contract with the club on 7 October 2021. He made his professional debut with Hull City in a 1–0 EFL Championship win over Cardiff City on 24 November 2021.

On 27 January 2022, Mills joined Falkirk on loan until the end of the 2021–22 season.

On 1 September 2022, Mills joined Gateshead on loan until January 2023.

On 10 February 2023, Mills joined Solihull Moors on a 28-day loan spell, this was extended for a further month on 13 March 2023.

On 22 February 2024, Mills joined League of Ireland Premier Division club Bohemians on loan until the end of June. Mills scored his first goal for Bohemians against Galway United in Eamon Deacy Park on 1 April 2024. In May 2024, his loan was extended until the end of Bohs' season in November. His departure from Bohemians was announced on 2 November 2024.

Following the conclusion of the 2024–25 season, Mills was released by Hull City.

After his release by Hull City, Mills joined FC Halifax Town.

== International career ==
Born in England, Mills is of Irish descent. He captained the Republic of Ireland U19s in October 2021.
