= Leigh Kavanagh =

Irish footballer (born 2003)

Personal information
- Full name: Leigh Robert Kavanagh
- Date of birth: 27 December 2003 (age 22)
- Position: Defender

Team information
- Current team: Bohemians
- Number: 20

Youth career
- –2020: Bray Wanderers
- 2020–2024: Brighton & Hove Albion
- 2022–2023: Derby County (loan)

Senior career*
Years	Team	Apps	(Gls)
2020	Bray Wanderers	1	(0)
2023–2024	Brighton & Hove Albion	0	(0)
2024–	Bohemians	33	(0)
2026	→ Galway United (loan)	6	(0)

International career
2019	Republic of Ireland U17	2	(0)
- * Club domestic league appearances and goals as of 23:12, 2 November 2026 (UTC)

Leigh Robert Kavanagh (born 27 December 2003) is an Irish professional footballer who plays as a defender for League of Ireland Premier Division club Bohemians. He has represented the Republic of Ireland U17 side in 2019.

== Career ==
=== Bray Wanderers ===
Kavanagh came through the academy at Bray Wanderers having previously played for their schoolboy feeder club St Joseph's Boys. He featured for Bray in the League of Ireland First Division, prior to joining Brighton in July 2020.

=== Brighton ===
During the 2020–21 season, Kavanagh suffered a tear on his miniscus while training for the Brighton youth team, which ruled him out for the remainder of the season. He signed his first professional contract with Brighton in July 2021. The following season, he joined Derby County on a season-long loan. In July 2023, he signed a new one-year contract with Brighton, with the option a further season. In December 2023, he began to be included with the Brighton first-team squad, and was named as a match-day substitute in matches in the Premier League and the Europa League.

=== Bohemians ===
He signed for League of Ireland Premier Division club Bohemians in July 2024.

==== Galway United loan ====
On 1 July 2026, Kavanagh was loaned out to fellow League of Ireland Premier Division club Galway United until the end of the season. After starting almost every game for the club following his arrival, Kavanagh got injured in the last minute of Galway United's FAI Cup quarter-final match against Drogheda United. An injury which would see him miss the rest of the season.

== International career ==
He has been called up for the Republic of Ireland at youth level.
