= Oscar Traynor Centre =

Football ground in Dublin, Ireland

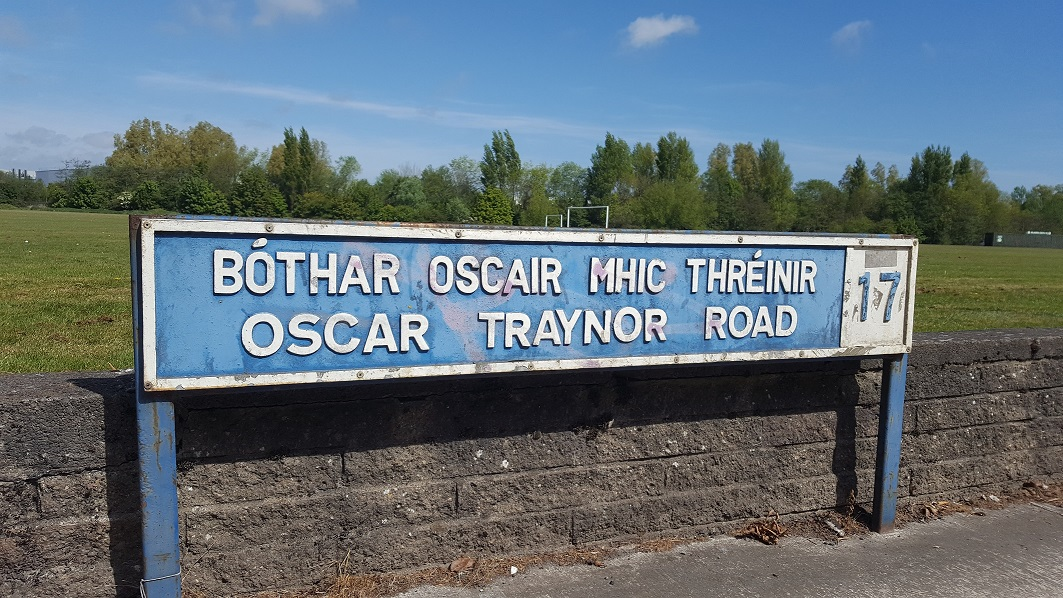

- Location within Dublin
- Full name: Oscar Traynor Coaching and Development Centre
- Former names: AFL Coaching & Development Centre
- Location: Coolock, County Dublin
- Coordinates: 53.3962°N 6.2272°W
- Owner: Dublin City Council
- Operator: Bohemian F.C. (via 'The Oscar Traynor Coaching and Development Centre CLG')
- Capacity: 1,000
- Surface: Artificial turf

Construction
- Opened: 1985
- Renovated: 2001
- Cost: €688,000 (1985)

Tenants
- North Dublin Schoolboys/girls League (NDSL) 2001—present Bohemian F.C. (academy) 2017—present Bohemians Women (WNL) 2020—2022

The Oscar Traynor Centre (Irish: Ionad Oscar Mac Thréinfhir) is an association football venue in Coolock, Northside, Dublin, Ireland. The ground was previously home to Women's National League club Bohemians from 2020 to 2022.

The centre includes a grass pitch, with a sprinkler and drainage system, and an all-weather artificial soccer pitch with flood lighting.

== History ==
In September 1985 TD Jim Tunney officially opened the AFL Coaching and Development Centre, which had been constructed by Dublin's Amateur Football League (AFL) at a cost of approximately €688,000. The venue underwent significant expansion in 2001, when the North Dublin Schoolboys/girls League (NDSL) agreed to pool resources with the AFL. Floodlights, additional all-weather pitches and a separate building for the NDSL, in addition to the AFL clubhouse, elevated the facility to "a centre of coaching and soccer excellence".

In January 2012 the Evening Herald reported that the Oscar Traynor Centre "faced an uncertain future", as the board of the company running the centre, the Oscar Traynor Coaching and Development Centre (OTCDC), had resigned amid strained relations between the AFL and NDSL. This was attributed to financial challenges faced due to the economic downturn. The NDSL subsequently entered into an arrangement with Bohemian FC in June 2013, which gave the League of Ireland club access to the Oscar Traynor Centre facilities. By 2017, Bohemians had based their underage academy at the ground. When Bohemians launched a senior Women's National League club in 2020, they based the team at the Oscar Traynor Centre instead of joining the men's team at Dalymount Park. On 22 January 2022, the club announced their women's team would play their home games at Dalymount Park.

The ground is situated on the road from Coolock to Santry, which is named for former Football Association of Ireland President Oscar Traynor.

== Other facilities ==
The lease on the property provides for the facility to be used solely for the development of association football.

In addition to its pitches, the centre has an analysis room, a café, car parking and a gym.

== Internationals ==
In June 2005, the Republic of Ireland women's national football team defeated the Faroe Islands 2–1 at the Oscar Traynor Centre with both goals scored by Carmel Kissane. The centre also hosted the Republic of Ireland under-15 boys team, who beat Finland 1–0 at the Oscar Traynor Centre in April 2013, and hosted the under-16 boys' UEFA Under-16 Development Tournament game against Belgium on 15 May 2013, ending in a 2–0 victory for the home team.
