= 2026 St Patrick's Athletic F.C. season =

Irish football club season

St Patrick's Athletic F.C.
2026 season
- Chairman: Garrett Kelleher
- Manager: Stephen Kenny
- Stadium: Richmond Park, Inchicore, Dublin 8
- League of Ireland Premier Division: 3rd
- FAI Cup: Quarter Final (Eliminated by Bohemians)
- Leinster Senior Cup: Runners-up (to Bray Wanderers)
- Top goalscorer: League: Aidan Keena (10 goals); Ryan Edmondson (10 goals); All: Aidan Keena (17 goals)
- Highest home attendance: 5,435 vs Bohemians (24 April)
- Lowest home attendance: 500 (Est.) vs Montpelier (28 March)
Home colours	Away colours	Third colours

The 2026 season was St Patrick's Athletic F.C.'s 97th year in existence and was the Supersaint's 75th consecutive season in the top-flight of Irish football. The league fixtures were announced on 16 December 2025, with Pats facing rivals Bohemians in their opening league game of the season in a marquee game at the Aviva Stadium. Having missed out on European football the previous season, the team achieved a third place finish in the league to return to UEFA Conference League football in 2027, while they remained firmly in the title race until two weeks before the end of the season when they ultimately fell away. The cup competitions saw them knocked out of the FAI Cup at home to Bohemians in the Quarter Final after a penalty shootout, while in the Leimster Senior Cup they were defeated in the final for the second season running, after a 2–1 defeat to Bray Wanderers. 2026 saw a current St Patrick's Athletic player called up to the FIFA World Cup for the first time when goalkeeper Joseph Anang was selected for the Ghana squad, while in June Kian Leavy became the first current Pat's player to be capped by the Republic of Ireland senior team since 1971.

== Squad ==
No.	Name	Position(s)	Nationality	Hometown	Date of birth (age)	Previous club	Year signed	Club apps.	Club goals
Goalkeepers
1	Danny Rogers	GK	(Republic of Ireland)	(United States) New York City, New York State	23 March 1994 (age 32)	(England) Oldham Athletic	2022	46	0
43	Darragh Brunton	GK	(Republic of Ireland)	Dublin	1 June 2009 (age 17)	(Republic of Ireland) St Patrick's Athletic Academy	2026	0	0
44	Luke Cullen	GK	(Republic of Ireland)	Saggart, Dublin	10 December 2008 (age 17)	(Republic of Ireland) St Patrick's Athletic Academy	2026	3	0
49	Sean Molloy	GK	(Republic of Ireland)	Dublin	2 August 2004 (age 22)	(Republic of Ireland) Inchicore Athletic	2025	2	0
94	Joseph Anang	GK	(Ghana)	Teshie, Accra	8 June 2000 (age 26)	(England) West Ham United	2024	130	0
–	Sebastian Clarke	GK	(Republic of Ireland)	Dublin	29 September 2010 (age 16)	(Republic of Ireland) St Patrick's Athletic Academy	2026	0	0
Defenders
2	Seán Hoare	CB	(Republic of Ireland)	Castleknock, Dublin	5 March 1994 (age 32)	(Republic of Ireland) Shamrock Rovers	2025	147	6
3	Anthony Breslin	LB	(Republic of Ireland)	Blanchardstown, Dublin	13 February 1997 (age 29)	(Republic of Ireland) Bohemians	2022	180	6
4	Joe Redmond	CB	(Republic of Ireland)	Tallaght, Dublin	21 January 2000 (age 26)	(Republic of Ireland) Drogheda United	2022	194	13
5	Tom Grivosti	CB	(England)	West Derby, Liverpool	15 June 1999 (age 27)	(Scotland) Ross County	2022	112	3
15	Ronan Boyce	RB	(Republic of Ireland)	Ramelton, Donegal	12 May 2001 (age 25)	(Republic of Ireland) Derry City	2026	7	0
23	James Brown	RB/RW	(Republic of Ireland)	Blanchardstown, Dublin	4 June 1998 (age 28)	(Scotland) Kilmarnock	2026	33	1
24	Luke Turner	CB	(Republic of Ireland)	Drimnagh, Dublin	20 May 2002 (age 24)	(Northern Ireland) Cliftonville	2024	93	8
30	Josh O'Connor	CB/RB	(Republic of Ireland)	Kilcoole, Wicklow	9 June 2009 (age 17)	(Republic of Ireland) St Patrick's Athletic Academy	2026	1	0
32	Billy Canny	RB	(Republic of Ireland)	Howth, Dublin	28 May 2008 (age 18)	(Republic of Ireland) St Patrick's Athletic Academy	2024	6	0
33	Sean McHale	CB	(Republic of Ireland)	Dunboyne, Meath	26 March 2005 (age 21)	(Republic of Ireland) St Patrick's Athletic Academy	2023	5	1
39	Sam Steward	CB	(Republic of Ireland)	Tyrrelstown, Dublin	13 February 2008 (age 18)	(Republic of Ireland) St Patrick's Athletic Academy	2024	7	0
40	Kimson Kibaga	LB	(Republic of Ireland)	Castleknock, Dublin	14 December 2010 (age 15)	(Republic of Ireland) St Patrick's Athletic Academy	2026	1	0
50	Ivan Graminschii	LB	(Moldova)	(Republic of Ireland) Blanchardstown, Dublin	5 February 2007 (age 19)	(Republic of Ireland) St Patrick's Athletic Academy	2024	3	0
52	Féilim Dikčius	CB	(Republic of Ireland)	Kilcock, Kildare	19 January 2007 (age 19)	(Republic of Ireland) St Patrick's Athletic Academy	2026	1	0
54	Harry Leonard	RB	(Republic of Ireland)	Dublin	9 September 2008 (age 18)	(Republic of Ireland) St Patrick's Athletic Academy	2025	1	0
55	Cian Doyle	LB	(Republic of Ireland)	Dunboyne, Meath	9 October 2008 (age 18)	(Republic of Ireland) St Patrick's Athletic Academy	2026	1	0
–	Luke Fitzsimons	CB	(Republic of Ireland)	Mullingar, Westmeath		(Republic of Ireland) St Patrick's Athletic Academy	2026	0	0
Midfielders
6	Jamie Lennon	CDM	(Republic of Ireland)	Santry, Dublin	9 May 1998 (age 28)	(Republic of Ireland) St Patrick's Athletic Academy	2017	292	8
7	Zack Elbouzedi	RW	(Republic of Ireland)	Swords, Dublin	5 April 1998 (age 28)	(Sweden) AIK	2024	73	10
8	Chris Forrester	CM/CAM	(Republic of Ireland)	Smithfield, Dublin	17 December 1992 (age 33)	(Scotland) Aberdeen	2019	454	97
10	Kian Leavy	CAM/LW/RW	(Republic of Ireland)	Ardee, Louth	21 March 2002 (age 24)	(England) Reading	2023	123	13
11	Jason McClelland	LW/CM/LB	(Republic of Ireland)	Templeogue, Dublin	5 March 1997 (age 29)	(Republic of Ireland) UCD	2020	203	14
16	Darragh Nugent	CM	(Republic of Ireland)	Knocklyon, Dublin	1 March 2001 (age 25)	(Republic of Ireland) Shamrock Rovers	2026	34	3
17	Romal Palmer	CM	(England)	Wigan, Greater Manchester	30 September 1998 (age 28)	(Turkey) Göztepe	2024	57	6
19	Barry Baggley	CM/CDM	(Northern Ireland)	Turf Lodge, Belfast	11 January 2002 (age 24)	(England) Fleetwood Town	2025	82	3
25	Simon Power	RW/LW	(Republic of Ireland)	Greystones, Wicklow	13 May 1998 (age 28)	(Republic of Ireland) Sligo Rovers	2025	41	4
28	Rhys Bartley	CM	(Republic of Ireland)	Finglas, Dublin	3 March 2006 (age 20)	(Republic of Ireland) St Patrick's Athletic Academy	2023	8	0
31	Billy Hayes	LW	(Republic of Ireland)	Clontarf, Dublin	6 June 2008 (age 18)	(Republic of Ireland) St Patrick's Athletic Academy	2024	5	0
34	Kian Quigley	CM/CB	(Republic of Ireland)	Greystones, Wicklow	29 January 2009 (age 17)	(Republic of Ireland) St Patrick's Athletic Academy	2025	5	0
36	Luke Kehir	CAM/CM	(Republic of Ireland)	Leixlip, Kildare	2 February 2006 (age 20)	(Republic of Ireland) St Patrick's Athletic Academy	2024	2	0
37	Joe Carroll-Byrne	RW	(Republic of Ireland)	Dublin	3 August 2009 (age 17)	(Republic of Ireland) St Patrick's Athletic Academy	2026	4	0
42	Glory Nzingo	CAM/ST	(Republic of Ireland)	Blanchardstown, Dublin	4 November 2004 (age 22)	(Wales) Swansea City	2026	10	2
45	Matty O'Hara	CAM/CM/LB	(Republic of Ireland)	Leixlip, Kildare	15 April 2006 (age 20)	(Republic of Ireland) St Patrick's Athletic Academy	2024	9	0
46	Niall Sullivan	CM	(Republic of Ireland)	Dublin	11 February 2009 (age 17)	(Republic of Ireland) St Patrick's Athletic Academy	2025	3	0
47	Sammy Ogungbe	RW	(Republic of Ireland)	Dublin	28 April 2009 (age 17)	(Republic of Ireland) St Patrick's Athletic Academy	2025	5	0
48	Ryan Sheridan	CAM/CM	(Republic of Ireland)	Kilcullen, Kildare	31 March 2009 (age 17)	(Republic of Ireland) St Patrick's Athletic Academy	2025	19	1
53	Jason Spelman	CDM	(Republic of Ireland)	Kilcolgan, Galway	2 April 2009 (age 17)	(Republic of Ireland) St Patrick's Athletic Academy	2025	2	0
–	Blake Devereux Lynch	LW	(Republic of Ireland)	Dublin	3 January 2010 (age 16)	(Republic of Ireland) St Patrick's Athletic Academy	2026	1	0
–	Rhys Williams	CM	(Republic of Ireland)	Dublin	27 July 2010 (age 16)	(Republic of Ireland) St Patrick's Athletic Academy	2026	0	0
Forwards
9	Aidan Keena	ST	(Republic of Ireland)	Mullingar, Westmeath	25 April 1999 (age 27)	(England) Cheltenham Town	2024	86	32
18	Max Mata	ST	(New Zealand)	Auckland, North Island	10 July 2000 (age 26)	(New Zealand) Auckland FC	2026	15	1
21	Anthony Olusanya	ST	(Finland)	Jakobstad, Ostrobothnia	1 February 2000 (age 26)	(Sweden) Kalmar	2026	13	2
22	Yssouf Soro	ST	(Ivory Coast)	Treichville, Abidjan	8 October 2006 (age 20)	(Republic of Ireland) St Patrick's Athletic Academy	2026	1	0
27	Ryan Edmondson	ST	(England)	Harrogate, North Yorkshire	20 May 2001 (age 25)	(Australia) Central Coast Mariners	2026	39	10
35	Sam Rooney	ST	(Republic of Ireland)	Tallaght, Dublin	24 November 2008 (age 17)	(Republic of Ireland) St Patrick's Athletic Academy	2025	14	6
51	Ashley Okeowo	ST	(Republic of Ireland)	Dublin	26 April 2010 (age 16)	(Republic of Ireland) St Patrick's Athletic Academy	2026	0	0

=== Transfers ===
==== Transfers in ====
Date	Position	Nationality	Name	From	Fee	Ref.
1 December 2025	RW	(Republic of Ireland)	Jason Folarin Oyenuga	(Republic of Ireland) Athlone Town	Return from loan	
1 December 2025	CB	(Republic of Ireland)	Sean McHale	(Republic of Ireland) Dundalk	Return from loan	
1 December 2025	CM	(Republic of Ireland)	Rhys Bartley	(Republic of Ireland) Bray Wanderers	Return from loan	
1 December 2025	CM	(Republic of Ireland)	Luke Kehir	(Republic of Ireland) Wexford	Return from loan	
1 December 2025	ST	(New Zealand)	Max Mata	(New Zealand) Auckland FC	Free transfer	
6 December 2025	RB	(Republic of Ireland)	Ronan Boyce	(Republic of Ireland) Derry City	Free transfer	
8 January 2026	CM	(Republic of Ireland)	Darragh Nugent	(Republic of Ireland) Shamrock Rovers	Swap deal	
27 January 2026	ST	(England)	Ryan Edmondson	(Australia) Central Coast Mariners	Free transfer	
29 January 2026	CAM	(Republic of Ireland)	Glory Nzingo	(Wales) Swansea City	Free transfer	
22 February 2026	RB	(Republic of Ireland)	James Brown	(Scotland) Kilmarnock	Free transfer	
28 July 2026	CB	(Republic of Ireland)	Sean McHale	(Republic of Ireland) Sligo Rovers	Recalled from loan	
28 July 2026	ST	(Finland)	Anthony Olusanya	(Sweden) Kalmar	Undisclosed fee	

==== Transfers out ====
Date	Position	Nationality	Name	Next club	Fee	Ref.
21 November 2025	CAM	(Republic of Ireland)	Brandon Kavanagh	(Republic of Ireland) Drogheda United	Undisclosed fee	
1 December 2025	CDM	(Northern Ireland)	Darren Robinson	(England) Derby County	End of loan	
1 December 2025	RB	(Sweden)	Axel Sjöberg	(Sweden) Eskilsminne	Released	
1 December 2025	RB	(Northern Ireland)	Ryan McLaughlin	(United States) Brooklyn FC	Released	
1 December 2025	LB	(England)	Al-Amin Kazeem	(Republic of Ireland) Galway United	Released	
1 December 2025	LW	(Jamaica)	Jordon Garrick	(Wales) Merthyr Town	Released	
1 December 2025	CM	(Republic of Ireland)	Anthony Dodd	(Republic of Ireland) Kilbarrack United	Released	
1 December 2025	CB	(Republic of Ireland)	Jonathan Kehir	(Republic of Ireland) Athlone Town	Released	
12 December 2025	ST	(Republic of Ireland)	Conor Carty	(Republic of Ireland) Waterford	€40,000	
1 January 2026 (Note: Transfer agreed on 4 February 2025, but the player only officially moved on 1 January 2026)	ST	(Republic of Ireland)	Mason Melia	(England) Tottenham Hotspur	€2,000,000	
8 January 2026	RW	(Republic of Ireland)	Jake Mulraney	(Republic of Ireland) Shamrock Rovers	Swap deal	
13 February 2026	RW	(Republic of Ireland)	Jason Folarin Oyenuga	(Republic of Ireland) Treaty United	Loan	
22 February 2026	CB	(Republic of Ireland)	Sean McHale	(Republic of Ireland) Sligo Rovers	Loan	
3 July 2026	CM	(Republic of Ireland)	Rhys Bartley	(Republic of Ireland) Wexford	Loan	
27 July 2026	CAM	(Republic of Ireland)	Glory Nzingo	Free agent	Released	
28 July 2026	CB	(England)	Tom Grivosti	(Republic of Ireland) Dundalk	Undisclosed fee	
29 July 2026	CAM	(Republic of Ireland)	Matty O'Hara	Free agent	Released	
5 August 2026	CB	(Republic of Ireland)	Luke Fitzsimons	(Italy) Torino	Undisclosed fee	

=== Squad statistics ===
==== Appearances, goals and cards ====
Number in brackets represents (appearances of which were substituted ON). Last updated – 30 October 2026

No.	Player	SSE Airtricity League		FAI Cup		Leinster Senior Cup		Total	
No.	Player	Apps	Goals	Apps	Goals	Apps	Goals	Apps	Goals
1	Danny Rogers	4	0	0	0	1	0	5	0
2	Seán Hoare	29(1)	2	3(1)	0	0	0	32(2)	2
3	Anthony Breslin	29(20)	1	3(2)	1	1	0	33(22)	2
4	Joe Redmond	36	1	3	0	0	0	39	1
6	Jamie Lennon	32(4)	2	3(1)	0	0	0	35(5)	2
7	Zack Elbouzedi	22(3)	4	2(1)	0	0	0	24(4)	4
8	Chris Forrester	28(18)	3	3	0	3	0	34(18)	3
9	Aidan Keena	31(10)	10	3	2	2	5	36(10)	17
10	Kian Leavy	29(1)	7	1	0	0	0	30(1)	7
11	Jason McClelland	27(10)	1	3	1	2	1	32(10)	3
15	Ronan Boyce	5(4)	0	0	0	2	0	7(4)	0
16	Darragh Nugent	30(16)	1	2(1)	0	2	2	34(17)	3
17	Romal Palmer	25(11)	3	1(1)	0	0	0	26(12)	3
18	Max Mata	14(13)	1	0	0	1	0	15(13)	1
19	Barry Baggley	34(8)	1	2(1)	0	1	1	37(9)	2
21	Anthony Olusanya	11(4)	2	2	0	0	0	13(4)	2
22	Yssouf Soro	0	0	0	0	1(1)	0	1(1)	0
23	James Brown	31(3)	1	2(1)	0	0	0	33(4)	1
24	Luke Turner	35	2	3	1	1	0	39	3
25	Simon Power	1(1)	0	1(1)	0	0	0	2(2)	0
27	Ryan Edmondson	36(8)	10	3(2)	0	0	0	39(10)	10
30	Josh O'Connor	0	0	0	0	1(1)	0	1(1)	0
31	Billy Hayes	0	0	0	0	3(1)	0	3(1)	0
32	Billy Canny	1(1)	0	0	0	5(1)	0	6(2)	0
33	Sean McHale	3(2)	1	0	0	0	0	3(2)	1
34	Kian Quigley	0	0	0	0	4(1)	0	4(1)	0
35	Sam Rooney	7(7)	0	1(1)	1	5(1)	5	13(9)	6
36	Luke Kehir	0	0	0	0	1(1)	0	1(1)	0
37	Joe Carroll-Byrne	0	0	0	0	4(1)	0	4(1)	0
39	Sam Steward	0	0	0	0	5	0	5	0
40	Kimson Kibaga	0	0	0	0	1(1)	0	1(1)	0
43	Darragh Brunton	0	0	0	0	0	0	0	0
44	Luke Cullen	0	0	0	0	3(1)	0	3(1)	0
46	Niall Sullivan	0	0	0	0	2	0	2	0
47	Sammy Ogungbe	0	0	0	0	4(4)	0	4(4)	0
48	Ryan Sheridan	12(8)	1	2(1)	0	4(1)	0	18(10)	1
49	Sean Molloy	0	0	0	0	2	0	2	0
50	Ivan Graminschii	0	0	0	0	1(1)	0	1(1)	0
51	Ashley Okeowo	0	0	0	0	0	0	0	0
52	Féilim Dikčius	0	0	0	0	1(1)	0	1(1)	0
53	Jason Spelman	0	0	0	0	2	0	2	0
54	Harry Leonard	0	0	0	0	1(1)	0	1(1)	0
55	Cian Doyle	0	0	0	0	1(1)	0	1(1)	0
94	Joseph Anang	32	0	3	0	0	0	35	0
–	Blake Devereux Lynch	0	0	0	0	1(1)	0	1(1)	0
–	Sebastian Clarke	0	0	0	0	0	0	0	0
–	Rhys Williams	0	0	0	0	0	0	0	0
Players that left during the season
5	Tom Grivosti	10(4)	0	1	0	1	0	12(4)	0
28	Rhys Bartley	2(2)	0	0	0	1	0	3(2)	0
38	Jason Folarin Oyenuga	0	0	0	0	0	0	0	0
42	Glory Nzingo	7(7)	0	0	0	3	2	10(7)	2
45	Matty O'Hara	0	0	0	0	2	0	2	0
–	Luke Fitzsimons	0	0	0	0	0	0	0	0

==== Top scorers ====
Includes all competitive matches. Last updated 30 October 2026

Number	Name	SSE Airtricity League	FAI Cup	Leinster Senior Cup	Total
9	Aidan Keena	10	2	5	17
18	Ryan Edmondson	10	0	0	10
10	Kian Leavy	7	0	0	7
35	Sam Rooney	0	1	5	6
7	Zack Elbouzedi	4	0	0	4
11	Jason McClelland	1	1	1	3
24	Luke Turner	2	1	0	3
8	Chris Forrester	3	0	0	3
16	Darragh Nugent	1	0	2	3
17	Romal Palmer	3	0	0	3
6	Jamie Lennon	2	0	0	2
3	Anthony Breslin	1	1	0	2
19	Barry Baggley	1	0	1	2
21	Anthony Olusanya	2	0	0	2
2	Seán Hoare	2	0	0	2
42	Glory Nzingo	0	0	2	2
33	Kian Leavy	1	0	0	1
48	Ryan Sheridan	1	0	0	1
23	James Brown	1	0	0	1
4	Joe Redmond	1	0	0	1
18	Max Mata	1	0	0	1
–	Own goal	1	0	1	2

==== Top assists ====
Includes all competitive matches. Last updated 30 October 2026

Number	Name	SSE Airtricity League	FAI Cup	Leinster Senior Cup	Total
9	Aidan Keena	5	1	1	7
23	James Brown	5	1	0	6
7	Zack Elbouzedi	5	0	0	5
19	Barry Baggley	3	0	2	5
4	Joe Redmond	3	1	0	4
48	Ryan Sheridan	1	0	3	4
8	Chris Forrester	3	0	1	4
24	Luke Turner	3	0	1	4
10	Kian Leavy	4	0	0	4
6	Jamie Lennon	3	0	0	3
2	Seán Hoare	2	0	0	2
27	Ryan Edmondson	1	1	0	2
3	Anthony Breslin	0	1	1	2
53	Jason Spelman	0	0	2	2
11	Jason McClelland	2	0	0	2
21	Anthony Olusanya	1	0	0	1
16	Darragh Nugent	1	0	0	1
35	Sam Rooney	1	0	0	1
39	Sam Steward	0	0	1	1
42	Glory Nzingo	0	0	1	1
17	Romal Palmer	1	0	0	1
18	Max Mata	0	0	1	1
5	Tom Grivosti	0	0	1	1

==== Top clean sheets ====
Includes all competitive matches. Number in brackets indicates clean sheet from substitute appearances. Last updated 30 October 2026

Number	Name	SSE Airtricity League	FAI Cup	Leinster Senior Cup	Total
1	Danny Rogers	3/4	0/0	1/1	4/5
44	Luke Cullen	0/0	0/0	2/3(1)	2/3(1)
49	Sean Molloy	0/0	0/0	1/2	1/2
94	Joseph Anang	11/32	0/3	0/0	11/35
–	Sebastian Clarke	0/0	0/0	0/0	0/0

==== Disciplinary record ====
Last updated 30 October 2026

Number	Name	SSE Airtricity League		FAI Cup		Leinster Senior Cup		Total	
Number	Name	Yellow card	Red card	Yellow card	Red card	Yellow card	Red card	Yellow card	Red card
2	Seán Hoare	9	1	2	0	0	0	11	1
6	Jamie Lennon	9	0	1	0	0	0	10	0
4	Joe Redmond	6	0	0	0	0	0	6	0
24	Luke Turner	4	0	2	0	0	0	6	0
23	James Brown	5	0	0	0	0	0	5	0
8	Chris Forrester	2	0	1	0	1	0	4	0
17	Romal Palmer	3	0	1	0	0	0	4	0
27	Ryan Edmondson	4	0	0	0	0	0	4	0
21	Anthony Olusanya	3	0	0	0	0	0	3	0
3	Anthony Breslin	3	0	0	0	0	0	3	0
16	Darragh Nugent	1	0	1	0	1	0	3	0
19	Barry Baggley	2	0	0	0	0	0	2	0
11	Jason McClelland	2	0	0	0	0	0	2	0
48	Ryan Sheridan	2	0	0	0	0	0	2	0
10	Kian Leavy	2	0	0	0	0	0	2	0
35	Sam Rooney	0	0	1	0	0	0	1	0
50	Ivan Graminschii	0	0	0	0	1	0	1	0
53	Jason Spelman	0	0	0	0	1	0	1	0
94	Joseph Anang	1	0	0	0	0	0	1	0
45	Matty O'Hara	0	0	0	0	1	0	1	0
18	Max Mata	1	0	0	0	0	0	1	0
15	Ronan Boyce	1	0	0	0	0	0	1	0
5	Tom Grivosti	1	0	0	0	0	0	1	0
32	Billy Canny	0	0	0	0	1	0	1	0
Totals		56	1	5	0	6	0	67	1

==== Captains ====
No.	P	Name	Country	No. games	Notes
5	DF	Joe Redmond	(Republic of Ireland)	39	Captain
8	MF	Chris Forrester	(Republic of Ireland)	2	Vice-captain
1	GK	Danny Rogers	(Republic of Ireland)	1	
3	DF	Anthony Breslin	(Republic of Ireland)	1	
34	MF	Kian Quigley	(Republic of Ireland)	1	

Last updated: 30 October 2026
Source: Competitive match reports.
Competitive matches only
Matches started as captain only
Country: FIFA nationality; No.: Squad number; P: Position; Name: Player name; No. Games: Number of games started as captain.

== Club ==
=== Coaching staff ===
- First-team Manager: Stephen Kenny
- Assistant Coach: Brian Gartland
- Assistant Coach: Seán O'Connor (until 14 July)
- Technical Coach: Alan Murphy (since August)
- Goalkeeping coach: Pat Jennings
- Director of Football: Ger O'Brien
- Technical Director: Alan Mathews
- Head of Performance: Graham Byrne
- Assistant Head of Performance: Harry Cornally
- Sports Performance Coach: Kevin McManamon
- Analyst: Chris Jenkins
- Head of Medical: Sam Rice
- Physio: David Mugalu
- Athletic Therapist: Cian O'Malley
- Club Doctor: Eoin Godkin
- Masseuse: Christy O'Neill
- Equipment Manager: David McGill
- Head of Academy Football: Ian Bermingham
- Assistant Head of Academy: Jamie Moore
- Lead Academy Player Development Coach: Karl Lambe
- Academy Lead Strength & Conditioning Coach: James McCrudden
- Academy Strength & Conditioning Coach: Tony Flanagan
- Head of Academy Goalkeeping: Pat Jennings
- Head of Academy Medical: David Mugalu
- Academy Physio: Christy O'Neill
- Head of Academy Data: Philip Power
- Academy Kit & Equipment: Ross Murray
- Player Welfare: Vicky Fisher
- Under 20s Head Coach: Alan Brady
- Under 20s Assistant Coach: Ciaran Creagh
- Under 20s Assistant Coach: Ian Cully
- Under 20s Goalkeeping Coach: Gabriel Sava
- Under 17s Head Coach: Ian Bermingham
- Under 17s Assistant Coach: Ian Dunne
- Under 17s Goalkeeping Coach: Sean Molloy
- Under 15s Head Coach: Chris Byrne
- Under 15s Assistant Coach: Philip Hughes
- Under 15s Assistant Coach: Jamie Moore
- Under 15s Goalkeeping Coach: Sean Molloy
- Under 14s Head Coach: Mark Connolly
- Under 14s Assistant Coach: Philip Power
- Under 14s Goalkeeping Coach: Mick Coakley
- Elite Training Programme Coach: Karl Lambe
- Elite Training Programme Coach: Chris Forrester
- Head of Cherry Orchard Partnership: Paul Webb

=== Kit ===
Supplier: Umbro
Sponsor(s): Clune (Front of Home & Fourth Jersey)
Elliott Group (Front of Away jersey)
The Wolfe Tones (Front of Third Jersey)
Manguard (Back of Jersey)
Bill Griffin Motors (Sleeves)
LHK (Shorts)

Home	Away	Third	Fourth

The club released new Home, Away and Third kits for the season, with the previous season's Away kit being repurposed as a Fourth kit.

Type	Shirt	Shorts	Socks	Info
Home	Red/White Sleeves	White	White	Worn 34 times; against Wexford (FRN) (N), Bray Wanderers (FRN) (A), Cork City (FRN) (N), Longford Town (LSC) (N), Treaty United (FRN) (N), UCD (FRN) (A), Shamrock Rovers (LOI) (A), Dundalk (LOI) (H), Galway United (LOI) (H), Drogheda United (LOI) (H), Derry City (LOI) (H), Montpelier (LSC) (H), Sligo Rovers (LOI) (H), Shamrock Rovers (LOI) (H), Bohemians (LOI) (H), Blackrock College (LSC) (H), Waterford (LOI) (H), Shelbourne (LOI) (H), Longford Town (FRN) (N), Drogheda United (LOI) (H), Sligo Rovers (LOI) (H), Bray Wanderers (LSC) (H), Galway United (LOI) (H), Wexford (FAI) (H), Dundalk (LOI) (H), Derry City (LOI) (H), Shamrock Rovers (FAI) (H), Waterford (LOI) (H), Bohemians (FAI) (H), Shamrock Rovers (LOI) (H), Bray Wanderers (FRN) (A), Dundalk (FRN) (H), Shelbourne (LOI) (H), Bohemians (LOI) (H)
Away	Blue & Burgundy Stripes/Navy Sleeves	Navy	Navy	Worn 6 times; against Dundalk (LOI) (A), Derry City (LOI) (A), Dundalk (LSC) (A), Shamrock Rovers (LOI) (A), Dundalk (LOI) (A), Derry City (LOI) (A)
Third	Cream/Green collar	Green	Green	Worn 11 times; against Shelbourne (LOI) (A), Waterford (LOI) (A), Drogheda United (LOI) (A), Galway United (LOI) (A), Sligo Rovers (LOI) (A), Bohemians (LOI) (A), Waterford (LOI) (A), Shelbourne (LOI) (A), Drogheda United (LOI) (A), Sligo Rovers (LOI) (A), Galway United (LOI) (A)
Fourth	Sky Blue	White	Sky Blue	Worn 1 time; against Bohemians (LOI) (N)

Key:
LOI=League of Ireland Premier Division
FAI=FAI Cup
LSC=Leinster Senior Cup
FRN=Friendly

== Competitions ==
=== League of Ireland Premier Division ===
==== League table ====
Pos	Team	Pld	W	D	L	GF	GA	GD	Pts	Qualification or relegation
1	Shamrock Rovers (C)	36	20	8	8	59	38	+21	68	Qualification for Champions League first qualifying round
2	Bohemians	36	19	8	9	63	44	+19	65	Qualification for Conference League second qualifying round
3	St Patrick's Athletic	36	17	9	10	55	31	+24	60	Qualification for Conference League first qualifying round
4	Shelbourne	36	12	13	11	52	50	+2	49	
5	Derry City	36	11	15	10	50	47	+3	48	Qualification for Europa League first qualifying round (Note: Derry City won the 2026 FAI Cup.)
6	Dundalk	36	11	12	13	55	59	−4	45	
7	Waterford	36	10	13	13	54	61	−7	43	
8	Galway United	36	10	12	14	46	53	−7	42	
9	Drogheda United (R)	36	10	10	16	44	57	−13	40	Qualification for promotion/relegation play-off
10	Sligo Rovers (R)	36	5	10	21	28	66	−38	25	Relegation to League of Ireland First Division

Source: League of Ireland
Rules for classification: 1) Points; 2) Goal difference; 3) Goals scored.
(C) Champions; (R) Relegated

==== Results summary ====
Overall								Home						Away					
Pld	W	D	L	GF	GA	GD	Pts	W	D	L	GF	GA	GD	W	D	L	GF	GA	GD
36	17	9	10	53	31	+22	60	10	3	5	32	15	+17	7	6	5	21	16	+5

Last updated: 30 October 2026.

==== Results by round ====
Round	1	2	3	4	5	6	7	8	9	10	11	12	13	14	15	16	17	18	19	20	21	22	23	24	25	26	27	28	29	30	31	32	33	34	35	36
Ground	A	A	H	H	A	H	H	A	H	A	H	A	H	A	A	H	H	A	A	H	H	A	H	A	H	H	A	A	H	H	A	A	H	A	A	H
Result	D	L	W	W	W	W	D	W	W	L	L	W	W	D	D	W	L	D	L	W	W	L	W	D	D	D	W	W	L	W	W	W	L	L	D	L
Position	5	9	5	2	2	2	2	2	1	1	2	2	1	2	2	2	2	2	3	2	2	3	3	3	2	2	2	2	2	2	1	1	3	3	3	3

Updated to match(es) played on 30 October 2026. Source: 2025 League of Ireland Premier Division
A = Away; H = Home; W = Win; D = Draw; L = Loss

==== Matches ====
Win Draw Loss

8 February 2026 1	Bohemians	0–0	St Patrick's Athletic	Ballsbridge, Dublin 4
14:00 GMT	Senan Mullen (yellow card) 11'	Report	Tom Grivosti (yellow card) 27'; Luke Turner (yellow card) 72'	Stadium: Aviva Stadium; Attendance: 21,472; Referee: Kevin O'Sullivan
Note: Live on Virgin Media Two

20 February 2026 2	Shamrock Rovers	2–0	St Patrick's Athletic	Tallaght, Dublin 24
20:00 GMT	Michael Noonan 69'; Adam Brennan 80'	Report		Stadium: Tallaght Stadium; Attendance: 7,573; Referee: Rob Harvey

27 February 2026 3	St Patrick's Athletic	4–0	Dundalk	Inchicore, Dublin 8
19:45 GMT	Romal Palmer 20'; Seán Hoare 26'; Romal Palmer (yellow card) 35'; James Brown (yellow card) 43'; Zack Elbouzedi 48'; Ryan Edmondson (yellow card) 81'; Aidan Keena 83'	Report	Ronan Teahan (yellow card) 60'	Stadium: Richmond Park; Attendance: 4,427; Referee: Lucas Keating

2 March 2026 4	St Patrick's Athletic	1–0	Galway United	Inchicore, Dublin 8
19:45 GMT	Romal Palmer (yellow card) 2'; Barry Baggley (yellow card) 69'; Kian Leavy 90'; Ronan Boyce (yellow card) 90+3'	Report	Killian Brouder (yellow card) 6'; Wasiri Williams (yellow card) 90+5'	Stadium: Richmond Park; Attendance: 3,809; Referee: Aaron O'Dowd
Note: Fixture was originally scheduled for 13 February but was postponed due to a waterlogged pitch.

6 March 2026 5	Shelbourne	2–3	St Patrick's Athletic	Drumcondra, Dublin 3
20:00 GMT	James Roche (yellow card) 13'; Rodrigo Freitas (yellow card) 43'; Harry Wood 72'; John Martin 75'; Sam Bone (yellow card) 89'; Maill Lundgren (yellow card) 90+1'	Report	Ryan Edmondson 56'; Ryan Edmondson 61'; James Brown (yellow card) 72'; Max Mata 90+2'; Max Mata (yellow card) 90+3'	Stadium: Tolka Park; Attendance: 5,090; Referee: Paul Norton
Note: Live on Virgin Media Two

13 March 2026 6	St Patrick's Athletic	4–1	Drogheda United	Inchicore, Dublin 8
19:45 GMT	Ryan Edmondson 53'; Ryan Edmondson (yellow card) 60'; Aidan Keena 65' (pen.); Kian Leavy 68'; Romal Palmer 82'	Report	Thomas Oluwa 6'; Leo Burney (yellow card) 22'; Mark Doyle (penalty missed) 60'; Jason Bucknor (yellow card) 75'	Stadium: Richmond Park; Attendance: 4,778; Referee: Rob Hennessy

16 March 2026 7	St Patrick's Athletic	0–0	Derry City	Inchicore, Dublin 8
19:45 GMT		Report	Michael Duffy (yellow card) 55'; Barry Cotter (yellow card) 61'; Darragh Markey (yellow card) 73'; Jamie Stott (yellow card) 85'	Stadium: Richmond Park; Attendance: 4,502; Referee: Rob Harvey

20 March 2026 8	Waterford	0–2	St Patrick's Athletic	Waterford, County Waterford
19:45 GMT	Luke Heeney (yellow card) 52'; Ronan Mansfield (yellow card) 79'; Dean McMenamy (yellow card) 86'	Report	Luke Turner 28'; Luke Turner 70'; Seán Hoare (yellow card) 90+4'	Stadium: RSC; Attendance: 2,378; Referee: Neil Doyle

3 April 2026 9	St Patrick's Athletic	4–1	Sligo Rovers	Inchicore, Dublin 8
19:45 GMT	Romal Palmer 12'; Ryan Edmondson 36'; Anthony Breslin 52'; Darragh Nugent 76'	Report	Joe Redmond 4' (o.g.); Oliver Denham (yellow card) 43'; Maï Traoré (yellow card) 82'	Stadium: Richmond Park; Attendance: 4,485; Referee: Kevin O'Sullivan

6 April 2026 10	Dundalk	2–0	St Patrick's Athletic	Dundalk, County Louth
19:45 GMT	Tyreke Wilson 7'; Shane Tracey 21'; Bobby Burns (yellow card) 23'; Daryl Horgan (yellow card) 36'; Aodh Dervin (yellow card) 39'; Daryl Horgan (yellow card) 81' (yellow-red card)	Report	Jason McClelland (yellow card) 19'	Stadium: Oriel Park; Attendance: 3,294; Referee: Aaron O'Dowd

10 April 2026 11	St Patrick's Athletic	0–1	Shamrock Rovers	Inchicore, Dublin 8
20:00 GMT	Kian Leavy (yellow card) 74'; Chris Forrester (yellow card) 76'	Report	Jack Byrne 9'; Jack Byrne (yellow card) 45'; Edward McGinty (yellow card) 55'; Matt Healy (yellow card) 75'; John O'Sullivan (yellow card) 84'	Stadium: Richmond Park; Attendance: 5,026; Referee: Rob Harvey
Note: Live on Virgin Media Two

17 April 2026 12	Drogheda United	1–3	St Patrick's Athletic	Drogheda, County Louth
19:45 GMT	Shane Farrell (yellow card) 26'; Conor Kane (yellow card) 45'; Brandon Kavanagh 64'; Ryan Brennan (yellow card) 81'	Report	Aidan Keena 1'; Jamie Lennon (yellow card) 33'; Conor Keeley 33' (o.g.); Kian Leavy 37'; Joe Redmond (yellow card) 62'; Darragh Nugent (yellow card) 65'	Stadium: Sullivan and Lambe Park; Attendance: 2,323; Referee: Lucas Keating

24 April 2026 13	St Patrick's Athletic	3–1	Bohemians	Inchicore, Dublin 8
19:45 GMT	Ryan Edmondson 10'; Jamie Lennon 42'; Ryan Edmondson 53'	Report	Markuss Strods 1'; Adam McDonnell (yellow card) 52'	Stadium: Richmond Park; Attendance: 5,435; Referee: Kevin O'Sullivan

1 May 2026 14	Galway United	2–2	St Patrick's Athletic	Galway, County Galway
19:45 GMT	Matty Wolfe (yellow card) 4'; Aaron Bolger 61'; Aaron Bolger 90+4'	Report	Ryan Edmondson 13'; Joseph Anang (yellow card) 38'; Jamie Lennon (yellow card) 40'; Chris Forrester 54'; Ryan Edmondson (yellow card) 66'	Stadium: Eamonn Deacy Park; Attendance: 2,243; Referee: Rob Hennessey

4 May 2026 15	Sligo Rovers	1–1	St Patrick's Athletic	Sligo, County Sligo
17:00 GMT	Cian Kavanagh (yellow card) 32'; Archie Meekison 42' (pen.); Sean Stewart (yellow card) 53'	Report	Seán Hoare (yellow card) 2'; Kian Leavy 7'; James Brown (yellow card) 37'	Stadium: The Showgrounds; Attendance: 3,163; Referee: Marc Lynch

8 May 2026 16	St Patrick's Athletic	4–1	Waterford	Inchicore, Dublin 8
20:00 GMT	Chris Forrester 45+3' (pen.); Zack Elbouzedi 57'; Zack Elbouzedi 60'; Ryan Edmondson 77'	Report	John Mahon 5'; Sam Glenfield (yellow card) 7'	Stadium: Richmond Park; Attendance: 4,132; Referee: Rob Harvey
Note: Live on Virgin Media Two

15 May 2026 17	St Patrick's Athletic	0–1	Shelbourne	Inchicore, Dublin 8
19:45 GMT	Luke Turner (yellow card) 15'; Seán Hoare (yellow card) 28'; Jamie Lennon (yellow card) 84'; Seán Hoare (yellow card) 90+6' (yellow-red card)	Report	Kerr McInroy (yellow card) 39'; Milan Mbeng (yellow card) 57'; Zeno Ibsen Rossi (yellow card) 76'; John Martin (yellow card) 80'; Daniel Kelly 81'; Wessel Speel (yellow card) 90+2'; Sean Gannon (yellow card) 90+5'	Stadium: Richmond Park; Attendance: 5,041; Referee: Rob Hennessey

22 May 2026 18	Derry City	0–0	St Patrick's Athletic	Derry, Northern Ireland
19:45 GMT	Cameron Dummigan (yellow card) 17'; Adam O'Reilly (yellow card) 33'; Kevin dos Santos (yellow card) 75'; Jamie Stott (yellow card) 77'; Barry Cotter (yellow card) 79'; Josh Thomas (yellow card) 90+6'; Henry Rylah (yellow card) 90+7'; Darragh Markey (yellow card) 90+7'	Report	Jamie Lennon (yellow card) 38'; Joe Redmond (yellow card) 90+7'	Stadium: Celtic Park; Attendance: 3,308; Referee: Aaron O'Dowd
Note: Moved from Derry City's Ryan McBride Brandywell Stadium due to ongoing works in replacing the Astro turf playing surface with a grass surface.

29 May 2026 19	Shamrock Rovers	1–0	St Patrick's Athletic	Tallaght, Dublin 24
20:00 GMT	Graham Burke 9'; Jack Byrne (yellow card) 33'; Matt Healy (yellow card) 36'; Aaron Greene (yellow card) 83'; Edward McGinty (yellow card) 90+5'	Report	Seán Hoare (yellow card) 61'; Joe Redmond (yellow card) 88'	Stadium: Tallaght Stadium; Attendance: 8,661; Referee: Rob Hennessy
Note: Live on Virgin Media Two

12 June 2026 20	St Patrick's Athletic	2–0	Drogheda United	Inchicore, Dublin 8
19:45 GMT	Kian Leavy 34'; Seán Hoare (yellow card) 39'; Romal Palmer (yellow card) 45+1'; Zack Elbouzedi 61'	Report	Mark Doyle (yellow card) 14'	Stadium: Richmond Park; Attendance: 4,166; Referee: Lucas Keating

19 June 2026 21	St Patrick's Athletic	2–0	Sligo Rovers	Inchicore, Dublin 8
19:45 GMT	Joe Redmond (yellow card) 27'; Joe Redmond 90+3'; Chris Forrester 90+5'	Report	James McManus (yellow card) 70'; Conor Cannon (yellow card) 81'	Stadium: Richmond Park; Attendance: 3,816; Referee: Paul Norton

26 June 2026 22	Bohemians	2–0	St Patrick's Athletic	Phibsborough, Dublin 7
19:45 GMT	Harry Vaughan (yellow card) 8'; Patrick Hickey (yellow card) 33'; Colm Whelan 39' (pen.); Patrick Hickey (yellow card) 45' (yellow-red card); Ross Tierney 89'; Dayle Rooney (yellow card) 90+1'	Report	Anthony Breslin (yellow card) 38'	Stadium: Dalymount Park; Attendance: 4,223; Referee: Rob Harvey

3 July 2026 23	St Patrick's Athletic	3–0	Galway United	Inchicore, Dublin 8
19:45 GMT	Ryan Edmondson 8'; Kian Leavy 17'; Aidan Keena 23'	Report	Wasiri Williams (yellow card) 32'; Stephen Walsh (yellow card) 44'; Leigh Kavanagh (yellow card) 90'	Stadium: Richmond Park; Attendance: 4,318; Referee: Kevin O'Sullivan

10 July 2026 24	Waterford	1–1	St Patrick's Athletic	Waterford, County Waterford
20:00 GMT	John Mahon (yellow card) 17'; Jørgen Voilås (yellow card) 32'; Conan Noonan 40'; Jordan Houston (yellow card) 55'	Report	Luke Turner (yellow card) 51'; Joe Redmond (yellow card) 61'; Aidan Keena 90+5' (pen.)	Stadium: RSC; Attendance: 2,533; Referee: Rob Hennessey
Note: Live on Virgin Media Two

24 July 2026 25	St Patrick's Athletic	1–1	Dundalk	Inchicore, Dublin 8
20:00 GMT	Anthony Breslin (yellow card) 35'; Seán Hoare (yellow card) 49'; Seán Hoare 57'; James Brown (yellow card) 90+4'	Report	Bobby Burns (yellow card) 5'; Rob Cornwall (yellow card) 12'; Aodh Dervin (yellow card) 24'; Daryl Horgan 36' (pen.); Keith Buckley (yellow card) 70'	Stadium: Richmond Park; Attendance: 4,510; Referee: Kevin O'Sullivan
Note: Live on Virgin Media Three

2 August 2026 26	St Patrick's Athletic	1–1	Derry City	Inchicore, Dublin 8
17:00 GMT	James Brown (yellow card) 23'; Aidan Keena 27' (pen.); Kian Leavy (yellow card) 34'; Jamie Lennon (yellow card) 88'	Report	Adam O'Reilly (yellow card) 37'; Darragh Burns (yellow card) 50'; James Clarke 72'	Stadium: Richmond Park; Attendance: 4,027; Referee: Rob Harvey
Note: Moved from 31 July due to Derry City's participation in the UEFA Conference League.

9 August 2026 27	Shelbourne	1–2	St Patrick's Athletic	Drumcondra, Dublin 3
17:00 GMT	Ali Coote (yellow card) 10'; Rodrigo Freitas (yellow card) 45+2'; James Norris 70'; Rodrigo Freitas (yellow card) 77' (yellow-red card); Odhrán Casey (yellow card) 82'	Report	Anthony Olusanya 7'; Anthony Breslin (yellow card) 10'; Anthony Olusanya (yellow card) 12'; James Brown 34'; Jamie Lennon (yellow card) 81'; Ryan Sheridan (yellow card) 90+2'; Ryan Edmondson (yellow card) 90+6'	Stadium: Tolka Park; Attendance: 4,511; Referee: Paul Norton
Note: Moved from 7 August due to Shelbourne's participation in the UEFA Conference League.

21 August 2026 28	Drogheda United	0–2	St Patrick's Athletic	Drogheda, County Louth
19:45 GMT	Conor Keeley (yellow card) 38'; Thomas Oluwa (yellow card) 63'	Report	Anthony Olusanya 17'; Barry Baggley 90+2'	Stadium: Sullivan and Lambe Park; Attendance: 2,184; Referee: Marc Lynch

28 August 2026 29	St Patrick's Athletic	0–2	Waterford	Inchicore, Dublin 8
19:45 GMT		Report	Jørgen Voilås 55'; John Mahon 76'	Stadium: Richmond Park; Attendance: 3,965; Referee: Paul McLaughlin

11 September 2026 30	St Patrick's Athletic	2–0	Shamrock Rovers	Inchicore, Dublin 8
20:00 GMT	Jason McClelland 4'; Aidan Keena 33'; Ryan Sheridan (yellow card) 50'	Report	Pico Lopes (yellow card) 32'; Cory O'Sullivan (yellow card) 80'	Stadium: Richmond Park; Attendance: 4,535; Referee: Rob Hennessey
Note: Live on Virgin Media Two. Reduced capacity due to a partial stadium closure following an incident at the St Patrick's Athletic vs Waterford fixture on 28 August.

14 September 2026 31	Dundalk	0–4	St Patrick's Athletic	Dundalk, County Louth
19:45 GMT	Leo Gaxha (yellow card) 69'; Harvey Warren (yellow card) 83'	Report	Aidan Keena 21'; Anthony Olusanya (yellow card) 29'; Aidan Keena 37'; Ryan Sheridan 75'; Ryan Edmondson 82'	Stadium: Oriel Park; Attendance: 2,435; Referee: Marc Lynch
Note: Moved from 4 September due to both club's participation in the FAI Cup.

19 September 2026 32	Sligo Rovers	0–1	St Patrick's Athletic	Sligo, County Sligo
19:45 GMT	Aidan Gabbidon (yellow card) 48'; Carl McHugh (yellow card) 62'; Kaiyne Woolery (yellow card) 90+4'	Report	Jamie Lennon (yellow card) 65'; Aidan Keena 74'	Stadium: The Showgrounds; Attendance: 2,189; Referee: Arnold Hunter

16 October 2026 33	St Patrick's Athletic	1–2	Shelbourne	Inchicore, Dublin 8
20:00 GMT	Aidan Keena (penalty missed) 15'; Jamie Lennon 43'; Jay McClelland (yellow card) 80'; Jamie Lennon (yellow card) 85'; Seán Hoare (yellow card) 90+1'	Report	Sean Moore 49'; Daniel Kelly (yellow card) 81'; Daniel Kelly 84'; Ali Coote (red card) 90'; Kerr McInroy (yellow card) 90+1'; Eddie Beach (yellow card) 90+4'	Stadium: Richmond Park; Attendance: 4,685; Referee: Paul Norton
Note: Live on Virgin Media Two. Reduced capacity due to a partial stadium closure following an incident at the St Patrick's Athletic vs Waterford fixture on 28 August.

19 October 2026 34	Derry City	1–0	St Patrick's Athletic	Derry, Northern Ireland
20:00 GMT	Darragh Burns (yellow card) 21'; Kevin dos Santos 62'; James Clarke (yellow card) 70'	Report	Anthony Olusanya (yellow card) 53'; Chris Forrester (yellow card) 80'	Stadium: Ryan McBride Brandywell Stadium; Attendance: 2,281; Referee: Aaron O'Dowd
Note: Live on Virgin Media Two. Moved from 9 October due to Derry City's participation in the FAI Cup.

23 October 2026 35	Galway United	0–0	St Patrick's Athletic	Galway, County Galway
19:45 GMT	Connor Barratt (yellow card) 51'; Lee Devitt (yellow card) 81'; Aaron Bolger (yellow card) 87'	Report	Seán Hoare (yellow card) 70'	Stadium: Eamonn Deacy Park; Attendance: 2,077; Referee: Kevin O'Sullivan

30 October 2026 36	St Patrick's Athletic	2–3	Bohemians	Inchicore, Dublin 8
19:45 GMT	Sean McHale 9'; Barry Baggley (yellow card) 41'; Luke Turner (yellow card) 45'; Kian Leavy 61'; Joe Redmond (yellow card) 68'; Jamie Lennon (yellow card) 71'	Report	Darragh Power (yellow card) 15'; Jordan Flores 36'; Patrick Hickey (yellow card) 41'; Cian Byrne 45+1'; Sam Todd 51'; Connor Parsons 57'; Paul Walters (yellow card) 70'	Stadium: Richmond Park; Attendance: 4,885; Referee: Rob Hennessy

=== FAI Cup ===
Win Draw Loss

==== Second Round ====
17 July 2026 Second Round	St Patrick's Athletic	2–1	Wexford	Inchicore, Dublin 8
19:45 GMT	Jason McClelland 14'; Darragh Nugent (yellow card) 41'; Aidan Keena 90'	Report	Ryan Ritchie (yellow card) 18'; Jake Doyle 69'; Adam Verdon (yellow card) 81'	Stadium: Richmond Park; Attendance: 1,419; Referee: Lucas Keating

==== Third Round ====
16 August 2026 Third Round	St Patrick's Athletic	3–2 (a.e.t.)	Shamrock Rovers	Inchicore, Dublin 8
14:00 GMT	Luke Turner (yellow card) 25'; Jamie Lennon (yellow card) 44'; Luke Turner 54'; Seán Hoare (yellow card) 83'; Aidan Keena 90+4' (pen.); Sam Rooney 93'; Sam Rooney (yellow card) 106'	Report	John O'Sullivan (yellow card) 19'; Jonathan Afolabi 39'; Michael Noonan 44'; Michael Noonan (yellow card) 56'; Enda Stevens (yellow card) 90+5'; Lee Grace (yellow card) 112'	Stadium: Richmond Park; Attendance: 4,660; Referee: Neil Doyle
Note: Live on RTÉ2.

==== Quarter Final ====
5 September 2026 Quarter Final	St Patrick's Athletic	1–1 (a.e.t.) (7–8 p)	Bohemians	Inchicore, Dublin 8
16:00 GMT	Luke Turner (yellow card) 48'; Chris Forrester (yellow card) 50'; Romal Palmer (yellow card) 90+8'; Seán Hoare (yellow card) 90'; Anthony Breslin 100'	Report	Sadou Diallo (yellow card) 90+8'; Cian Byrne (yellow card) 108'; Ryan Edmondson 111' (o.g.)	Stadium: Richmond Park; Attendance: 4,888; Referee: Paul Norton
	Penalties
	Barry Baggley (penalty scored); Joe Redmond (penalty scored); Seán Hoare (penalty missed); Ryan Sheridan (penalty scored); Ryan Edmondson (penalty scored); Darragh Nugent (penalty scored); Luke Turner (penalty scored); Romal Palmer (penalty missed)		Colm Whelan (penalty missed); Cian Byrne (penalty scored); Paddy Madden (penalty scored); Dawson Devoy (penalty scored); Ross Tierney (penalty scored); Senan Mullen (penalty scored); Adam McDonnell (penalty scored); Sadou Diallo (penalty scored); Patrick Hickey (penalty scored)
Note: Live on RTÉ2.

=== Leinster Senior Cup ===
Win Draw Loss

==== Round 3 - Group B ====
Team	Pld	W	D	L	GF	GA	GD	Pts
St Patrick's Athletic	2	2	0	0	10	3	7	6
Drogheda United	2	1	1	0	5	1	4	4
Longford Town	3	0	2	1	2	7	–5	2
Montpelier	3	0	1	2	4	10	–6	1

24 January 2026 Match 1	St Patrick's Athletic	5–0	Longford Town	Blanchardstown, Dublin 15
18:00 GMT	Billy Canny (yellow card) 23'; Aidan Keena 27'; Darragh Nugent 48'; Darragh Nugent 56'; Chris Forrester (yellow card) 59'; Sam Rooney (penalty missed) 63'; Aidan Keena 71'; Barry Baggley 75'	Report	Conor Errity (yellow card) 63'; Daragh Murtagh (yellow card) 66'	Stadium: FAI National Training Centre; Attendance: 200 (Est.); Referee: Robert Dowling

28 March 2026 Match 2	St Patrick's Athletic	5–3	Montpelier	Inchicore, Dublin 8
12:00 GMT	Aidan Keena 24'; Aidan Keena 41'; Glory Nzingo 56'; Aidan Keena 74'; Glory Nzingo 79'; Matty O'Hara (yellow card) 80'	Report	Lorcan Byrne 49'; Cian O'Brien 52'; Gerard Loftus (yellow card) 78'; Joe Fitzmaurice (yellow card) 89'; Gerard Loftus 90'	Stadium: Richmond Park; Attendance: 500 (Est.); Referee: Owen Murphy

Match 3	Drogheda United	Cancelled	St Patrick's Athletic	Drogheda, County Louth
				Stadium: Sullivan & Lambe Park
Note: Fixture was cancelled as the result became inconsequential to qualification to the Quarter Finals, with both sides already through.

==== Quarter Final ====
27 April 2026 Quarter Final	St Patrick's Athletic	5–0	Blackrock College	Inchicore, Dublin 8
19:30 GMT	Sam Rooney 10'; Sam Rooney 16'; Ossie McKenna 52' (o.g.); Jason McClelland 72'; Sam Rooney 81'	Report	Ben MacCarthy (yellow card) 29'; Ossie McKenna (yellow card) 66'	Stadium: Richmond Park; Attendance: 600 (Est.); Referee: Oliver Moran

==== Semi Final ====
26 May 2026 Semi Final	Dundalk	0–1	St Patrick's Athletic	Dundalk, County Louth
19:45 GMT		Report	Sam Rooney 42'; Jason Spelman (yellow card) 83'	Stadium: Oriel Park; Attendance: 150 (Est.); Referee: Paul McLaughlin

==== Final ====
30 June 2026 Final	Bray Wanderers	2–1	St Patrick's Athletic	Bray, County Wicklow
19:45 GMT	Richard Ferizaj (yellow card) 21'; Conor Knight 37'; Richard Ferizaj 56'	Report	Sam Rooney 25'; Darragh Nugent (yellow card) 82'; Ivan Graminschii (yellow card) 90+4'	Stadium: Carlisle Grounds; Attendance: 2,009; Referee: Daryl Carolan

=== Friendlies ===
Win Draw Loss

==== Pre-season ====
12 January 2026	St Patrick's Athletic	4–1	Wexford	Blanchardstown, Dublin 15
15:30 GMT	Anthony Breslin 58'; Glory Nzingo (trialist) 60'; Aidan Keena 75'; Aidan Keena 85'		Jake Doyle 15'; Ryan Butler (yellow card) 62'	Stadium: National Indoor Arena; Attendance: 0 (Behind Closed Doors); Referee: Darragh White

16 January 2026	Bray Wanderers	0–3	St Patrick's Athletic	Bray, County Wicklow
19:45 GMT			Max Mata 5'; Sam Rooney 79'; Kian Leavy 85'	Stadium: Carlisle Grounds; Attendance: 0 (Behind Closed Doors); Referee: Rob Harvey

23 January 2026	St Patrick's Athletic	1–1	Cork City	Baldonnel, Dublin 22
14:00 GMT	Romal Palmer 32'		Ruairí Keating 48'	Stadium: John Hyland Park; Attendance: 0 (Behind Closed Doors); Referee: Neil Doyle

27 January 2026	St Patrick's Athletic	2–1	Treaty United	Athlone, County Westmeath
14:00 GMT	Josh O'Connor 76'; Romal Palmer 78'		Mark Byrne 60' (pen.)	Stadium: Athlone Town Stadium; Attendance: 0 (Behind Closed Doors); Referee: Declan Toland

31 January 2026	UCD	0–3	St Patrick's Athletic	Belfield, Dublin 4
14:00 GMT			Kian Leavy 36'; Barry Baggley 54' (pen.); Kian Leavy 58'	Stadium: UCD Astro Belfield; Attendance: 120 (Est.); Referee: Jason Ray

==== Mid-season ====
8 June 2026	St Patrick's Athletic	7–0	Longford Town	Blanchardstown, Dublin 15
16:45 GMT	Chris Forrester (TBC); Aidan Keena (TBC); Aidan Keena (TBC); Aidan Keena (TBC); Jason McClelland (TBC); Max Mata (TBC); Max Mata (TBC)			Stadium: FAI National Training Centre; Attendance: 0 (Behind Closed Doors); Referee: Daryl Carolan

14 July 2026	St Patrick's Athletic (Republic of Ireland)	2–4	(England) Doncaster Rovers	Inchicore, Dublin 8
19:30 GMT	Darragh Nugent (yellow card) 68'; Sam Rooney 69' (pen.); Jason McClelland 77'	Report	Matty Pearson 14'; Luke Molyneux 17' (pen.); Brandon Hanlan 33'; Darren Robinson (yellow card) 68'; Brandon Hanlan 83'	Stadium: Richmond Park; Attendance: 750 (Est.); Referee: Daryl Carolan

28 September 2026	Bray Wanderers	2–2	St Patrick's Athletic	Bray, County Wicklow
17:30 GMT	TBC; TBC		TBC; TBC	Stadium: Carlisle Grounds; Attendance: 0 (Behind Closed Doors)

9 October 2026	St Patrick's Athletic	3–3	Dundalk	Inchicore, Dublin 8
13:00 GMT	Jamie Lennon 16'; Mayowa Animasahun 19' (o.g.); Max Mata 76'		Harvey Warren (yellow card) 22'; Declan McDaid 51'; Trevor Clarke 70'; Rob Cornwall 86'; Rob Cornwall (yellow card) 90'	Stadium: Richmond Park; Attendance: 0 (Behind Closed Doors); Referee: Mark Moynihan
