= Ryan Sheridan (footballer) =

Irish footballer (born 2009)

- Sheridan's post-match celebration after his first senior goal in September 2026

Personal information
- Full name: Ryan Sheridan
- Date of birth: 31 March 2009 (age 17)
- Place of birth: Kilcullen, County Kildare, Ireland
- Position: Midfielder

Team information
- Current team: St Patrick's Athletic
- Number: 48

Youth career
- Newbridge Town
- –2022: Crumlin United
- 2022–: St Patrick's Athletic

Senior career*
Years	Team	Apps	(Gls)
2025–	St Patrick's Athletic	12	(1)

International career^{‡}
2025–	Republic of Ireland U17	15	(4)
- * Club domestic league appearances and goals as of 23:28, 30 October 2026 (UTC) ‡ National team caps and goals as of 21:13, 21 November 2026 (UTC)

Ryan Sheridan (born 31 March 2009) is an Irish professional footballer who plays as a midfielder for League of Ireland Premier Division club St Patrick's Athletic.

== Club career ==
=== Early career ===
A native of Kilcullen, County Kildare, Sheridan attended secondary school at Cross and Passion College. He began playing football with Newbridge Town, then played for Crumlin United before joining the academy at League of Ireland club St Patrick's Athletic at Under-14 level. In November 2025, he was named League of Ireland U17 Division Player of the Year.

=== St Patrick's Athletic ===
On 5 September 2025, Sheridan made his senior debut for St Patrick's Athletic, with a late cameo off the bench in a 2–0 win over Drogheda United in the Quarter Final of the Leinster Senior Cup. In March 2026, he spent time on trial at Premier League club Nottingham Forest. On 30 June 2026, he assisted Sam Rooney's opening goal in a 2–1 loss away to Bray Wanderers in the Final of the 2025–26 Leinster Senior Cup, his third assist in the competition that season. On 3 July 2026, he made his League of Ireland Premier Division debut for the club, replacing Kian Leavy from the bench for the final 12 minutes of a 3–0 victory over Galway United at Richmond Park. On 21 August 2026, he provided his first senior league assist for the club, after coming off the bench he won the ball back and set Barry Baggley through on goal to finish the second goal in a 2–0 victory away to Drogheda United. On 14 September 2026, Sheridan scored his first goal in senior football in a 4–0 win away to Dundalk, controlling a James Brown cross before finding the top left corner with his left foot. The club's supporters voted him as their Player of the Month for September 2026. At the end of the season he was then voted St Patrick's Athletic Young Player of the Year for 2026 by the club's supporters.

== International career ==
In August 2025, Sheridan received his first international call-up, for the Republic of Ireland U17 side's friendlies in Hungary. He made his debut on 12 August 2025, replacing Josh O'Dwyer from the bench in a 2–2 draw with Turkey U17. On 14 October 2025, he scored his first international goal, in a 2–0 win away to Austria U17. On 31 March 2026, his 17th birthday, Sheridan scored in a 7–0 win over Slovakia U17 that secured his side's qualification to the FIFA U-17 World Cup. In November 2026, he was named in the squad for the 2026 FIFA U-17 World Cup.

== Style of play ==
Sheridan can play as an attacking midfielder or in a deep-lying midfield role and has been praised for his decision-making, athleticism, powerful running, ball-carrying ability and positional intelligence by St Patrick's Athletic midfield stalwart Jamie Lennon.

== Career statistics ==
As of match played on 30 October 2026

Appearances and goals by club, season and competition
Club	Season	League			FAI Cup		Other		Total	
Club	Season	Division	Apps	Goals	Apps	Goals	Apps	Goals	Apps	Goals
St Patrick's Athletic	2025	LOI Premier Division	0	0	0	0	1 (Note: Appearances in the Leinster Senior Cup)	0	1	0
St Patrick's Athletic	2026	LOI Premier Division	12	1	2	0	4	0	18	1
Career total			12	1	2	0	5	0	19	1

== Honours ==
Individual

- St Patrick's Athletic Young Player of the Year: 2026
