= Luke Turner (footballer) =

Northern Irish footballer (born 2002)

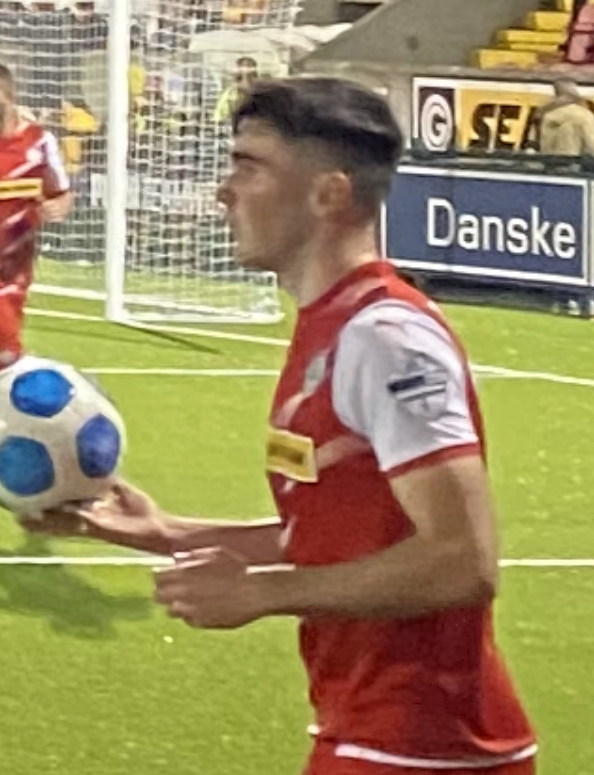
- Turner with Cliftonville in 2021

Personal information
- Full name: Luke Turner
- Date of birth: 20 May 2002 (age 24)
- Place of birth: Dublin, Ireland
- Height: 1.86 m (6 ft 1 in)
- Position: Centre-back

Team information
- Current team: St Patrick's Athletic
- Number: 24

Youth career
- Manortown United
- Crumlin United
- Lourdes Celtic
- Shelbourne
- Cherry Orchard
- Shamrock Rovers
- 2018–2019: Aberdeen

Senior career*
| Years | Team | Apps | (Gls) |
| 2019–2022 | Aberdeen | 0 | (0) |
| 2020–2021 | → Turriff United (loan) | 1 | (0) |
| 2021 | → Wexford (loan) | 10 | (1) |
| 2021–2022 | → Cliftonville (loan) | 35 | (1) |
| 2022–2024 | Cliftonville | 62 | (3) |
| 2024– | St Patrick's Athletic | 76 | (6) |

International career^{‡}
| 2018 | Republic of Ireland U16 | 2 | (0) |
| 2018–2019 | Republic of Ireland U17 | 8 | (0) |
| 2019 | Republic of Ireland U18 | 1 | (0) |
- * Club domestic league appearances and goals as of 22:32, 30 October 2026 (UTC) ‡ National team caps and goals as of 17 February 2023

Luke Turner (born 20 May 2002) is an Irish footballer who plays as a centre-back for League of Ireland Premier Division club St Patrick's Athletic.

== Club career ==
=== Youth career ===
As a youth player, played for local sides Manortown United, Crumlin United, Lourdes Celtic, Shelbourne and Cherry Orchard before moving to the youth academy of Shamrock Rovers.

=== Aberdeen ===
Turner began his career at Aberdeen. After that, he had loan spells at Turriff United, Wexford and Cliftonville.

=== Cliftonville ===
On 25 June 2022, Cliftonville announced the permanent signing of Turner from Aberdeen following his impressive performances throughout the 2021–22 season. He helped them win the 2021–22 Northern Ireland Football League Cup. He also won that season's Young Player of the Year award.

=== St Patrick's Athletic ===
On 30 January 2024, it was announced that Turner had signed for his boyhood club St Patrick's Athletic on a multi-year contract for an undisclosed fee that also saw David Odumosu move the other way to Cliftonville on a permanent contract. On 1 April 2024, he scored his first goals for the club in a 3–0 win over Sligo Rovers, first scoring a half volley from Conor Keeley's knockdown header from a corner to open the scoring, then doubling his side's lead with a diving header from another corner. On 10 May 2024, he scored his side's first equaliser of the game in a 2–2 draw away to Shamrock Rovers at Tallaght Stadium. On 17 September 2024, Turner scored his fourth goal of the season, opening the scoring with a header from a corner in an eventual 3–1 win over Maynooth University Town in the Semi Final of the Leinster Senior Cup. On 8 October 2024, Turner was part of the Pats side that defeated St Mochta's 2–1 in the final of the 2023–24 Leinster Senior Cup. On 7 August 2025, he made his first European appearance for the club, coming on as a half time substitute for Tom Grivosti in a defeat to Turkish giants Beşiktaş in the UEFA Conference League. On 22 August 2025, he scored his first goal of the season, with a 94th-minute winner in a 1–0 victory away to Drogheda United. On 20 March 2026, he scored two headers to secure a 2–0 victory for his side away to Waterford at the RSC. On 5 August 2026, it was announced that Turner had signed a new multi-year contract with the club. On 16 August 2026, with his side 2–0 down at half time, he scored the first goal of their comeback with a looping header in an eventual a 3–2 win over Shamrock Rovers after extra time in the Third Round of the FAI Cup. Turner was voted into the 2026 PFAI Team of the Year by his fellow players in the league, alongside 3 of his St Patrick's Athletic teammates.

== Career statistics ==
As of match played 30 October 2026

Appearances and goals by club, season and competition
| Club | Season | League | | | National Cup | | League Cup | | Europe | | Other | | Total | |
| Club | Season | Division | Apps | Goals | Apps | Goals | Apps | Goals | Apps | Goals | Apps | Goals | Apps | Goals |
|---|---|---|---|---|---|---|---|---|---|---|---|---|---|---|
| Aberdeen | 2019–20 | Scottish Premiership | 0 | 0 | 0 | 0 | 0 | 0 | 0 (Note: Appearance(s) in the UEFA Europa League) | 0 | 1 (Note: Appearance(s) in the Scottish Challenge Cup) | 0 | 1 | 0 |
| Aberdeen | 2020–21 | Scottish Premiership | 0 | 0 | — | | 0 | 0 | 0 | 0 | — | | 0 | 0 |
| Aberdeen | 2021–22 | Scottish Premiership | 0 | 0 | 0 | 0 | 0 | 0 | 0 | 0 | 1 | 0 | 1 | 0 |
| Aberdeen | Total | | 0 | 0 | 0 | 0 | 0 | 0 | 0 | 0 | 2 | 0 | 2 | 0 |
| Turriff United (loan) | 2020–21 | Highland Football League | 1 | 0 | 1 | 0 | — | | — | | — | | 2 | 0 |
| Wexford (loan) | 2021 | LOI First Division | 10 | 1 | — | | — | | — | | — | | 10 | 1 |
| Cliftonville (loan) | 2021–22 | NIFL Premiership | 35 | 1 | 3 | 1 | 5 | 0 | — | | 0 | 0 | 43 | 2 |
| Cliftonville | 2022–23 | NIFL Premiership | 35 | 1 | 3 | 0 | 3 | 0 | 2 (Note: Appearance(s) in the UEFA Europa Conference League) | 0 | 3 (Note: 2 appearances in the 2023 NIFL Premiership UEFA Europa Conference League Play-offs & 1 appearance in the Scottish Challenge Cup) | 0 | 45 | 1 |
| Cliftonville | 2023–24 | NIFL Premiership | 25 | 2 | 1 | 0 | 1 | 0 | — | | 1 | 0 | 28 | 2 |
| Cliftonville | Total | | 60 | 3 | 4 | 0 | 4 | 0 | 2 | 0 | 4 | 0 | 67 | 3 |
| St Patrick's Athletic | 2024 | LOI Premier Division | 28 | 3 | 1 | 0 | — | | 0 (Note: Appearance(s) in the UEFA Conference League) | 0 | 4 (Note: 1 appearance in the President of Ireland's Cup & 3 appearances, 1 goal in the Leinster Senior Cup) | 1 | 33 | 4 |
| St Patrick's Athletic | 2025 | LOI Premier Division | 13 | 1 | 2 | 0 | — | | 2 | 0 | 4 (Note: Appearances in the Leinster Senior Cup) | 0 | 21 | 1 |
| St Patrick's Athletic | 2026 | LOI Premier Division | 35 | 2 | 3 | 1 | — | | — | | 1 | 0 | 39 | 3 |
| St Patrick's Athletic | Total | | 76 | 6 | 6 | 1 | — | | 2 | 0 | 9 | 1 | 93 | 8 |
| Career total | | | 182 | 11 | 14 | 2 | 9 | 0 | 4 | 0 | 15 | 1 | 224 | 14 |

== Honours ==
Cliftonville

- Irish League Cup: 2021–22

St Patrick's Athletic

- Leinster Senior Cup: 2023–24

Individual

- PFAI Team of the Year: 2026
