= Sean McHale =

Irish footballer (born 2005)

Personal information
- Full name: Martin Sean McHale
- Date of birth: 26 March 2005 (age 21)
- Place of birth: Dunboyne, County Meath, Republic of Ireland
- Height: 1.87 m (6 ft 2 in)
- Position: Centre back

Team information
- Current team: St Patrick's Athletic
- Number: 33

Youth career
- Dunboyne
- –2020: Corduff United
- 2020–2022: Shelbourne
- 2022–2023: St Patrick's Athletic

Senior career*
Years	Team	Apps	(Gls)
2023–	St Patrick's Athletic	3	(1)
2024	→ Wexford (loan)	23	(2)
2025	→ Dundalk (loan)	19	(1)
2026	→ Sligo Rovers (loan)	17	(1)

International career^{‡}
2022	Republic of Ireland U17	5	(0)
2022	Republic of Ireland U18	1	(0)
- * Club domestic league appearances and goals as of 23:29, 30 October 2026 (UTC) ‡ National team caps and goals as of 15:47, 28 January 2026 (UTC)

Martin Sean McHale (born 26 March 2005) is an Irish professional footballer who plays as a centre back for League of Ireland Premier Division club St Patrick's Athletic. He has previously had loan spells at Wexford, Dundalk and Sligo Rovers.

== Club career ==
=== Youth career ===
A native of Dunboyne, County Meath, McHale began playing football with local side Dunboyne AFC. A move to Corduff United and then Shelbourne in January 2020 followed, where he earned himself a move to one of the League of Ireland's top academies at St Patrick's Athletic in 2022, joining up with the club's under-17 side then progressing onto the under-19s.

=== St Patrick's Athletic ===
McHale made his senior debut for St Patrick's Athletic on 31 January 2023, in a 3–1 defeat to Wexford in the Leinster Senior Cup. His next appearance came in the same competition just under a year later, in a 3–3 draw away to Usher Celtic, before he was loaned out in order to gain regular first team experience.

==== Wexford loan ====
In February 2024, McHale signed for League of Ireland First Division club Wexford on a season-long loan deal and on 8 March 2024, he scored the winning goal on his debut in a 2–1 win away to UCD at the UCD Bowl. He scored 2 goals in 29 appearances in all competitions as his side reached the FAI Cup Semi Finals and were defeated by Athlone Town in the Promotion Playoffs at the end of the season.

==== Dundalk loan ====
On 10 January 2025, McHale was loaned out to recently relegated League of Ireland First Division club Dundalk until the end of the season. On 9 May 2025, he scored his first goal for the club, opening the scoring in an eventual 2–2 draw against Bray Wanderers at Oriel Park. In July 2025 he picked up a season ending ankle injury, as his teammates went on to win the 2025 League of Ireland First Division title and the 2024–25 Leinster Senior Cup, to help him earn the first senior medals of his career. On 26 November 2025, it was confirmed that McHale would be returning to his parent club after scoring 1 goal in 21 appearances for Dundalk during his loan spell.

==== Sligo Rovers loan ====
On 22 February 2026, it was announced that McHale had signed for fellow League of Ireland Premier Division side Sligo Rovers on loan for the rest of the season. He made his debut for the club on 7 March 2026, helping them to their first win of the season in a 2–1 victory over Drogheda United at The Showgrounds. He scored his first goal for the club on 10 April 2026, a back post header to secure a 2–1 victory away to Bohemians at Dalymount Park. He made 18 appearances in all competitions before being recalled by his parent club on 28 July 2026.

==== Return from loans ====
On 28 July 2026, McHale was recalled from his loan by St Patrick's Athletic, following the departure of fellow centre back Tom Grivosti. On 19 September 2026, he made his long-awaited league debut for the club, replacing the injured Seán Hoare from the bench in a 1–0 win away to his former loan club Sligo Rovers. On 30 October 2026, he made his first league start for the club and scored his first senior goal for the club, opening the scoring in the 9th minute with a header from a corner in a defeat at home to Bohemians in the final game of the season.

== International career ==
In 2022 McHale was capped 5 times for the Republic of Ireland Under-17 team and once for the under-18s. His first call up was for an U17's friendly against Belgium in February 2022, alongside five of his St Patrick's Athletic teammates.

== Personal life ==
As well as association football, McHale also played Gaelic football in his youth, for local club St Peter's Dunboyne GAA and scored two points in their 2021 Division 6 Meath County Final win over Clann na nGael GAA. His ability at the sport saw him progress to inter-county level for Meath GAA, making his debut in 2019.

== Career statistics ==
As of match played on 30 October 2026

Appearances and goals by club, season and competition
Club	Season	League			National Cup		Europe		Other		Total	
Club	Season	Division	Apps	Goals	Apps	Goals	Apps	Goals	Apps	Goals	Apps	Goals
St Patrick's Athletic	2023	LOI Premier Division	0	0	0	0	0 (Note: Appearances in the UEFA Europa Conference League)	0	1 (Note: Appearances in the Leinster Senior Cup)	0	1	0
St Patrick's Athletic	2024	LOI Premier Division	0	0	—		—		1	0	1	0
St Patrick's Athletic	2025	LOI Premier Division	0	0	—		—		—		0	0
St Patrick's Athletic	2026	LOI Premier Division	3	1	—		—		0	0	3	1
St Patrick's Athletic	Total		3	1	0	0	0	0	2	0	5	1
Wexford (loan)	2024	LOI First Division	23	2	4	0	—		2 (Note: Appearances in the 2024 League of Ireland First Division Playoffs)	0	29	2
Dundalk (loan)	2025	LOI First Division	19	1	1	0	—		1	0	21	1
Sligo Rovers (loan)	2026	LOI Premier Division	17	1	1	0	—		—		18	1
Career total			62	5	6	0	0	0	5	0	73	5

== Honours ==
Dundalk

- League of Ireland First Division: 2025
- Leinster Senior Cup: 2024–25
