= Ronan Boyce =

Irish footballer (born 2001)

Personal information
- Full name: Ronan Boyce
- Date of birth: 12 May 2001 (age 25)
- Place of birth: Letterkenny, County Donegal, Ireland
- Position: Right back

Team information
- Current team: St Patrick's Athletic
- Number: 15

Youth career
- 2014–2017: Swilly Rovers
- 2017–2019: Derry City

Senior career*
Years	Team	Apps	(Gls)
2019–2025	Derry City	156	(15)
2026–	St Patrick's Athletic	5	(0)

International career^{‡}
2019	Republic of Ireland U19	2	(0)
- * Club domestic league appearances and goals as of 23:03, 24 April 2026 (UTC) ‡ National team caps and goals as of 16:30, 21 January 2025 (UTC)

Ronan Boyce (born 12 May 2001) is an Irish professional footballer who plays as a right back for League of Ireland Premier Division club St Patrick's Athletic.

== Club career ==
=== Early career ===
Boyce was born in Letterkenny, County Donegal. He grew up in Ramelton and played youth football with local club Swilly Rovers in the Ulster Senior League.

=== Derry City ===
Boyce joined League of Ireland club Derry City's under 17 side in 2017, making his first appearance against Dundalk U17 in July 2017. He played with the club's under-19 side in 2019, before making his senior competitive debut in the League of Ireland Premier Division as a substitute against Cork City later that season in September 2019. Boyce signed his first professional contract with the club in January 2021. He scored his first senior goal in April 2021, securing a 1–1 draw against Drogheda United. Boyce was voted Derry City Players' Player of the Year for the 2021 season and was also named in the 2021 PFAI Premier Division Team of the Year. Boyce made his 100th appearance for Derry City as the club defeated KuPS to reach the third qualifying round of the 2023–24 UEFA Europa Conference League. On 10 November 2024, he featured in the 2024 FAI Cup final as his side were defeated 2–0 by Drogheda United. On 6 December 2025, Derry confirmed that Boyce had left the club after turning down a new contract offer, having made 175 appearances during his 7 seasons with the club, scoring 15 goals.

=== St Patrick's Athletic ===
On 6 December 2025, Boyce signed for fellow League of Ireland Premier Division club St Patrick's Athletic. On 8 February 2026, he made his debut for the club in the opening game of the season, a 0–0 draw with Bohemians at the Aviva Stadium.

== Personal life ==
Outside of football, Boyce studied Strength & Conditioning with Setanta College while still playing.

== International career ==
Boyce received his first call up to the Republic of Ireland U19 squad in October 2019 ahead of two international friendlies against Denmark at The Showgrounds. Boyce was later called up to the Republic of Ireland U21 squad for the UEFA European Under-21 Championship qualifiers against Bosnia and Herzegovina and Luxembourg in August 2021.

== Career statistics ==
As of match played on 30 June 2026

Appearances and goals by club, season and competition
Club	Season	League			National Cup (Note: Includes FAI Cup)		League Cup (Note: Includes League of Ireland Cup)		Europe		Other		Total	
Club	Season	Division	Apps	Goals	Apps	Goals	Apps	Goals	Apps	Goals	Apps	Goals	Apps	Goals
Derry City	2019	LOI Premier Division	1	0	0	0	0	0	–		–		1	0
Derry City	2020	LOI Premier Division	1	0	0	0	–		0 (Note: Appearance(s) in the UEFA Europa League)	0	–		1	0
Derry City	2021	LOI Premier Division	34	6	2	0	–		–		–		36	6
Derry City	2022	LOI Premier Division	28	3	3	0	–		1 (Note: Appearance(s) in the UEFA Europa Conference League)	0	–		32	3
Derry City	2023	LOI Premier Division	31	2	2	0	–		6	0	0 (Note: Appearance in the President of Ireland's Cup)	0	39	2
Derry City	2024	LOI Premier Division	30	2	3	0	–		0 (Note: Appearance(s) in the UEFA Conference League)	0	–		33	2
Derry City	2025	LOI Premier Division	31	2	2	0	–		–		–		33	2
Derry City	Total		156	15	12	0	0	0	7	0	0	0	175	15
St Patrick's Athletic	2026	LOI Premier Division	5	0	0	0	–		–		2 (Note: Appearances in the Leinster Senior Cup)	0	7	0
Career total			161	15	12	0	0	0	7	0	2	0	182	15

== Honours ==
=== Club ===
Derry City

- FAI Cup (1): 2022
- President of Ireland's Cup (1): 2023

=== Individual ===
- PFAI Premier Division Team of the Year: 2021
- Derry City Players' Player of the Year: 2021
