= Darragh Nugent =

Irish footballer (born 2001)

Personal information
- Full name: Darragh Nugent
- Date of birth: 1 March 2001 (age 25)
- Place of birth: Knocklyon, Dublin, Ireland
- Height: 1.83 m (6 ft 0 in)
- Position: Midfielder

Team information
- Current team: St Patrick's Athletic
- Number: 16

Youth career
- Templeogue United
- St Joseph's Boys
- UCD
- Shamrock Rovers

Senior career*
Years	Team	Apps	(Gls)
2019–2026	Shamrock Rovers	70	(1)
2020	Shamrock Rovers II	16	(0)
2021	→ Longford Town (loan)	14	(0)
2022	→ Drogheda United (loan)	32	(2)
2026–	St Patrick's Athletic	30	(1)
- * Club domestic league appearances and goals as of 01:43, 24 October 2026 (UTC)

Darragh Nugent (born 1 March 2001) is an Irish footballer who plays as a midfielder for League of Ireland Premier Division club St Patrick's Athletic.

== Career ==
=== Youth Career ===
A native of Knocklyon, County Dublin, Nugent is the son of former League of Ireland veteran Martin Nugent, he began playing football with nearby side Templeogue United, then moved to St Joseph's Boys where he earned a move to the academy of UCD, before moving to Shamrock Rovers academy.

=== Shamrock Rovers ===
He appeared on the bench three times for Shamrock Rovers during the 2019 season. Nugent featured 16 times for the club reserve side Shamrock Rovers II in the 2020 League of Ireland First Division. He made his first team debut on 1 November 2020 in a 2–0 win over Finn Harps at Finn Park.

==== Longford Town ====
Nugent was loaned out to fellow League of Ireland Premier Division club Longford Town in July 2021. He scored his first goal for the club on 24 July 2021 in a 5–0 win over Bangor GG in the FAI Cup.

==== Drogheda United loan ====
On 17 January 2022, Nugent joined League of Ireland Premier Division club Drogheda United on a season-long loan.

==== Return from loan ====
Nugent scored his first goal for Rovers on 4 April 2024, a header in a 2–1 loss away to St Patrick's Athletic at Richmond Park.

=== St Patrick's Athletic ===
On 8 January 2026, he signed for Rovers' League of Ireland Premier Division rivals St Patrick's Athletic as part of the deal that saw Jake Mulraney go the other way. On 25 January 2026, he made his debut for the club, scoring twice from outside the box with his weaker left foot in a 5–0 win over Longford Town in the Leinster Senior Cup. On 3 April 2026, he scored his first league goal for the club, the fourth goal in a 4–1 win over Sligo Rovers at Richmond Park.

== Career statistics ==
As of match played on 23 October 2026

Appearances and goals by club, season and competition
Club	Season	League			National Cup		League Cup		Europe		Other		Total	
Club	Season	Division	Apps	Goals	Apps	Goals	Apps	Goals	Apps	Goals	Apps	Goals	Apps	Goals
Shamrock Rovers	2019	LOI Premier Division	0	0	0	0	0	0	0	0	0	0	0	0
Shamrock Rovers	2020	LOI Premier Division	2	0	1	0	—		0	0	—		3	0
Shamrock Rovers	2021	LOI Premier Division	4	0	—		—		0	0	0	0	4	0
Shamrock Rovers	2022	LOI Premier Division	0	0	—		—		–		0	0	0	0
Shamrock Rovers	2023	LOI Premier Division	19	0	0	0	—		0	0	2 (Note: One appearance in the President of Ireland's Cup; one appearance in the Leinster Senior Cup)	0	27	0
Shamrock Rovers	2024	LOI Premier Division	27	1	1	0	—		11 (Note: 3 appearances in the UEFA Champions League; 3 appearances in the UEFA Europa League; 5 appearances in the UEFA Conference League)	0	1 (Note: Appearance in the President of Ireland's Cup)	0	40	1
Shamrock Rovers	2025	LOI Premier Division	18	0	3	0	—		8 (Note: Appearance(s) in the UEFA Conference League)	0	0	0	29	0
Shamrock Rovers	Total		70	1	5	0	0	0	19	0	3	0	97	1
Shamrock Rovers II	2020	LOI First Division	16	0	—		—		—		—		16	0
Longford Town (loan)	2021	LOI Premier Division	14	0	2	1	—		—		—		16	1
Drogheda United (loan)	2022	LOI Premier Division	32	2	0	0	—		—		—		32	2
St Patrick's Athletic	2026	LOI Premier Division	30	1	2	0	—		—		2 (Note: Appearance(s) in the Leinster Senior Cup)	2	34	3
Career total			162	4	9	1	0	0	19	0	5	2	195	7

== Honours ==
Shamrock Rovers

- League of Ireland Premier Division: 2020, 2023, 2025
- FAI Cup: 2025
- President of Ireland's Cup: 2024
