= Joseph Anang =

Ghanaian association football player

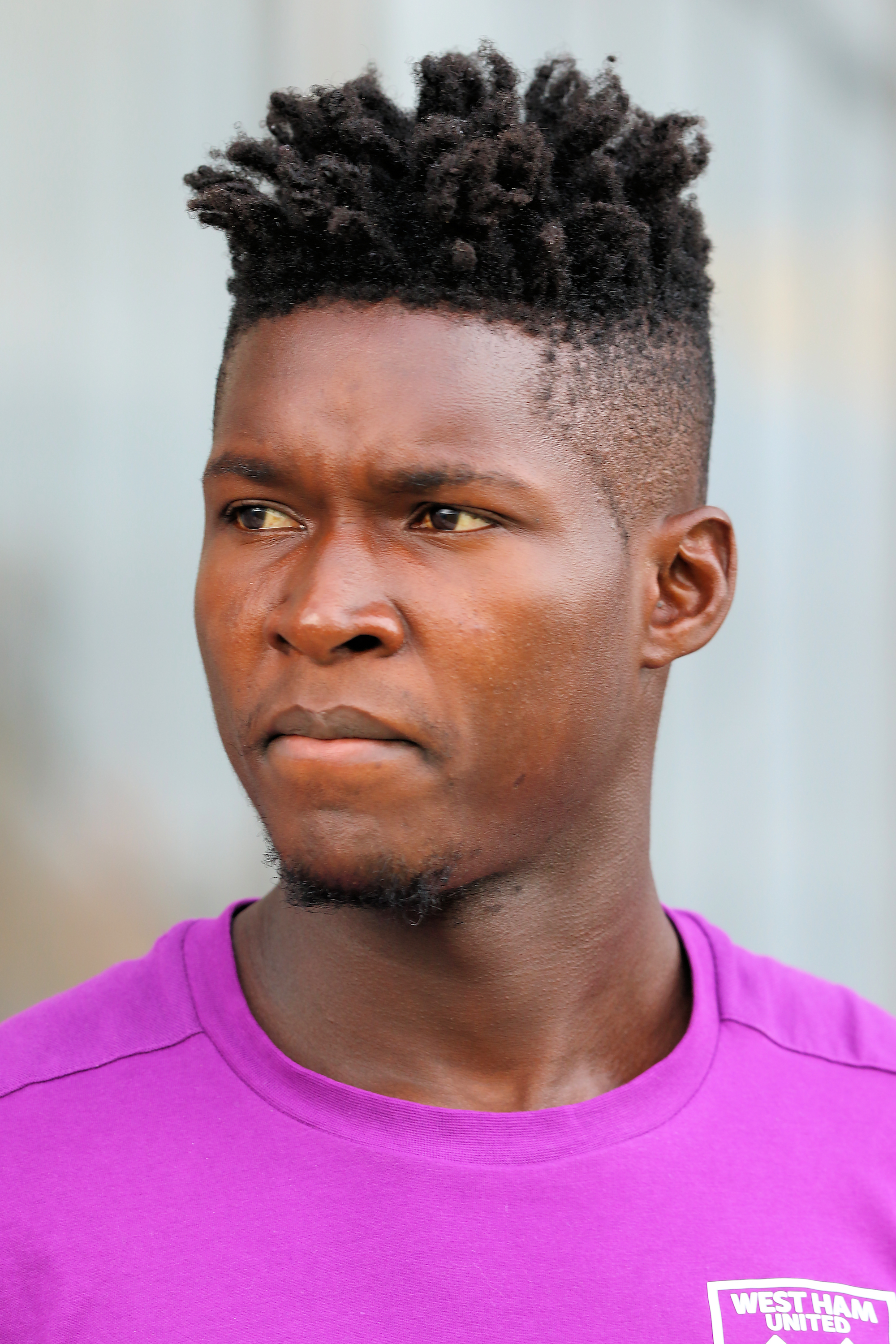
- Anang with West Ham United in 2019

Personal information
- Full name: Joseph Tetteh Anang
- Date of birth: 8 June 2000 (age 26)
- Place of birth: Teshie, Accra, Ghana
- Height: 1.90 m (6 ft 3 in)
- Position: Goalkeeper

Team information
- Current team: St Patrick's Athletic
- Number: 94

Youth career
- Danbort
- Wa All Stars
- 2017–2021: West Ham United

Senior career*
Years	Team	Apps	(Gls)
2021–2024	West Ham United	0	(0)
2021–2022	→ Stevenage (loan)	13	(0)
2022	→ St Patrick's Athletic (loan)	24	(0)
2022–2023	→ Derby County (loan)	0	(0)
2024–	St Patrick's Athletic	80	(0)

International career^{‡}
2019	England U20	1	(0)
2025–	Ghana	1	(0)
- * Club domestic league appearances and goals as of 23:27, 30 October 2026 (UTC) ‡ National team caps and goals as of 12:10, 14 November 2025 (UTC)

Joseph Tetteh Anang (born 8 June 2000) is a Ghanaian professional footballer who plays as a goalkeeper for League of Ireland Premier Division club St Patrick's Athletic and the Ghana national team.

== Early life ==
Born in Teshie, a suburb of Ghana's capital city Accra, Anang moved to England in his teenage years, following his parents leaving Ghana for a better life, Before playing as a goalkeeper, he played as a centre-back.

== Club career ==
=== West Ham United ===
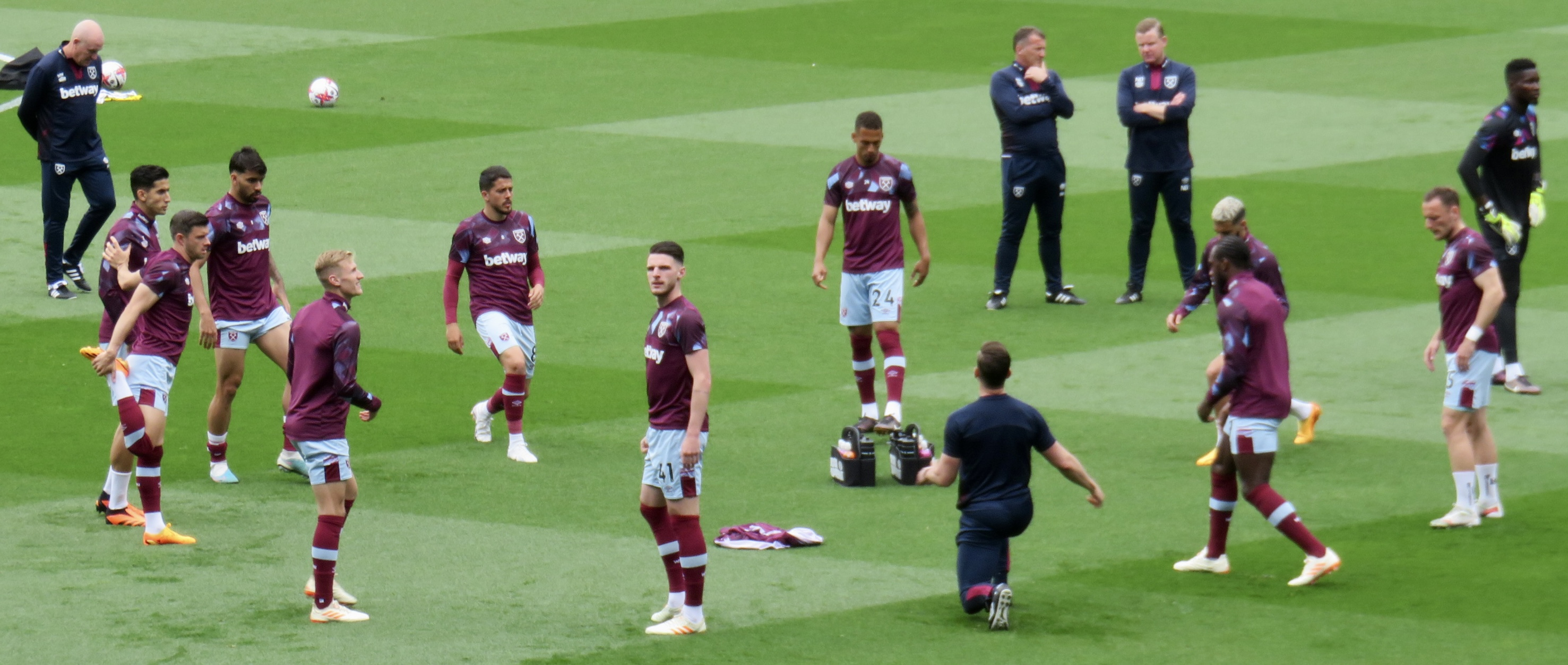
Anang (extreme right) warming up with West Ham United in 2023.

Anang began playing in the youth team for Danbort in his native Ghana, before moving to Ghana Premier League club Wa All Stars. He went on trial with West Ham United, ultimately signing for the club as an academy scholar in July 2017. He had to wait until March 2018 to play for the club's under-18 team, having not gained international clearance, during which he also trained with the first team alongside goalkeeper Adrián. Anang signed his first professional contract with West Ham on 1 July 2018. During his time with the club, he became close friends with fellow Ghanaian Mohammed Kudus when he signed from Ajax in 2023. He made five appearances in the EFL Trophy for West Ham's under-21 team. Anang signed a new contract with West Ham on 15 December 2020, with the agreement running until the summer of 2024. He departed the club at the end of his contract in 2024, having been on the bench as an unused substitute on 32 occasions for the first team.

==== Loan to Stevenage ====
Anang joined League Two club Stevenage on a season-long loan agreement on 15 June 2021. He made his English Football League debut in Stevenage's 1–0 victory against Barrow on 7 August 2021. Anang made 18 appearances during the first half of the 2021–22 season, before returning to West Ham in January 2022.

==== Loan to St Patrick's Athletic ====
On 28 January 2022, it was announced that Anang had signed for League of Ireland Premier Division side St Patrick's Athletic on loan until the end of November, ahead of their 2022 season, following a recommendation of the club by former West Ham United teammate Alfie Lewis who played for the club in 2021. On 11 February 2022, he made his debut for the club in the 2022 President of Ireland's Cup against Shamrock Rovers at Tallaght Stadium, as his side lost 5–4 on penalties after a 1–1 draw. He made his league debut for the club a week later, keeping a clean sheet in a 3–0 win away to Dublin rivals Shelbourne at Tolka Park. He made his first appearance in European football on 21 July 2022 in a 1–1 draw with Slovenian side NŠ Mura in the UEFA Europa Conference League. Anang was the penalty shootout "hero" in the second leg in Slovenia as his side won the shootout 6–5 following a 0–0 draw after extra time. Anang's loan was cut short in August 2022 with Pat's manager Tim Clancy stating that Anang refused to travel to Bulgaria for a UEFA Europa Conference League fixture against CSKA Sofia unless he was allowed to end his loan spell early after the club exited the competition.

==== Loan to Derby County ====
On 14 August 2022, Anang was recalled from his loan at St Patrick's Athletic and sent to Derby County on a season-long loan. He suffered a 'small arm fracture' in training shortly after signing for the club, an injury that kept him out of action for several months. The loan was terminated in January 2023.

==== Return to West Ham United ====
On 5 June 2024, West Ham United confirmed that Anang would depart the club upon the expiration of his contract at the end of the month.

=== Return to St Patrick's Athletic ===
On 24 June 2024, Anang returned to his old club St Patrick's Athletic on a two-and-a-half-year contract, becoming recently appointed manager Stephen Kenny's first signing at the club. Anang featured in all 6 of the club's UEFA Conference League games during the summer of 2024, as they beat Vaduz of Liechtenstein and Sabah of Azerbaijan before a narrow 2–0 defeat on aggregate against Turkish side İstanbul Başakşehir in the Play-Off Round of the competition. On 17 July 2025, Anang made the 100th appearance of his career, in a 2–0 win away to Hegelmann in the UEFA Conference League, in what was his 4th clean sheet in consecutive games. Anang finished the season with 18 sheets in 36 games, the most in the league, helping his side to the best defensive record in the league and a 5th place overall. On 8 February 2026, Anang was named Man of the Match in the opening game of the 2026 season after making some excellent 1v1 saves in a 0–0 draw with Bohemians at the Aviva Stadium. On 6 March 2026, Anang made his 100th appearance for the club in a 3–2 win away to rivals Shelbourne, having kept 44 clean sheets and conceding an average of just 0.98 goals per game in those appearances. The following week, he saved a penalty from ex-teammate Mark Doyle in the 60th minute to stop Drogheda United from taking a 2–1 lead as his side then went on to win 4–1 at Richmond Park. Anang was voted into the 2026 PFAI Team of the Year by his fellow players in the league, alongside 3 of his St Patrick's Athletic teammates. He was also voted St Patrick's Athletic Player of the Year for 2026 by the club's supporters.

== International career ==
=== England youth career ===
Anang represented England at under-20 level, making his debut as a 79th-minute substitute in a 3–0 victory against Iceland under-20s on 19 November 2019. In October 2024, Anang spoke on his ambition to represent the nation of his birth, revealing that he had held conversations with the Ghana camp for a couple of years about a call up, saying "I'm just putting in the work and waiting for a call-up, we've been speaking the last two years but I was at West Ham as a No 3 and not playing. They might look at me more now and, hopefully in the future, you never know."

=== Ghana senior career ===
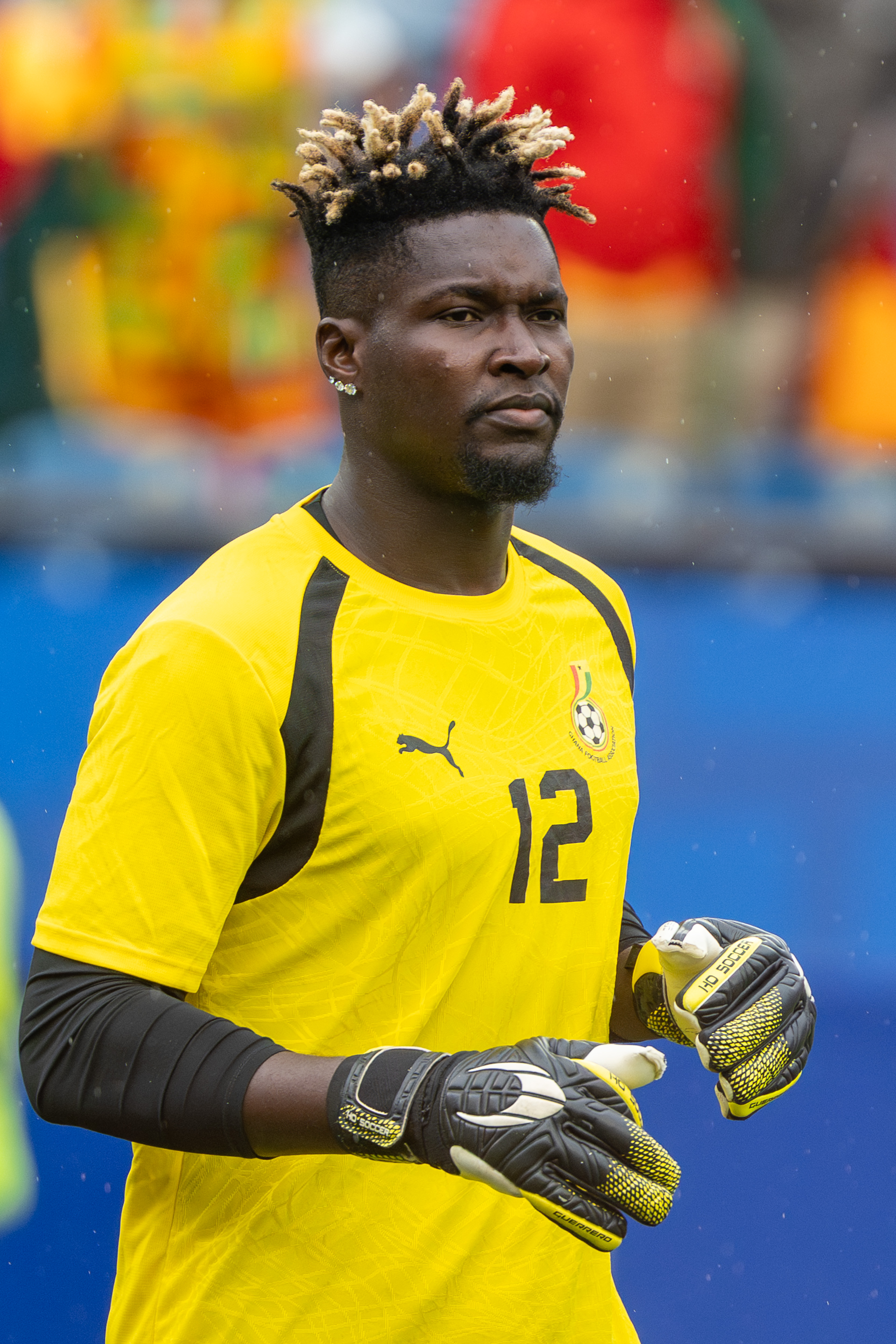
Anang with Ghana at the 2026 FIFA World Cup

On 26 May 2025, Anang received his first call up to the Ghana national team, for their games against Nigeria and Trinidad and Tobago in the 2025 Unity Cup in London. On 12 October 2025, he was part of the matchday squad as they confirmed qualification to the 2026 FIFA World Cup following a 1–0 win at home to Comoros, earning his club St Patrick's Athletic hundreds of thousands of Euro in the process. On 14 November 2025, Anang made his Ghana debut in a friendly game away to Japan in the 2025 Kirin Cup.

In June 2026, he was named in Ghana's squad for the 2026 World Cup.

== Career statistics ==
=== Club ===
As of match played 30 October 2026

Appearances and goals by club, season and competition
Club	Season	League			National cup (Note: Includes FA Cup & FAI Cup)		League cup		Europe		Other		Total	
Club	Season	Division	Apps	Goals	Apps	Goals	Apps	Goals	Apps	Goals	Apps	Goals	Apps	Goals
West Ham United U21	2018–19	—			—		—		—		1 (Note: Appearances in the EFL Trophy)	0	1	0
West Ham United U21	2019–20	—			—		—		—		2	0	2	0
West Ham United U21	2020–21	—			—		—		—		2	0	2	0
West Ham United U21	Total		—		—		—		—		5	0	5	0
West Ham United	2021–22	Premier League	0	0	0	0	0	0	0	0	—		0	0
West Ham United	2022–23	Premier League	0	0	0	0	0	0	0	0	—		0	0
West Ham United	2023–24	Premier League	0	0	0	0	0	0	0	0	—		0	0
West Ham United	Total		0	0	0	0	0	0	0	0	–		0	0
Stevenage (loan)	2021–22	League Two	13	0	1	0	2	0	—		2	0	18	0
St Patrick's Athletic (loan)	2022	LOI Premier Division	24	0	1	0	—		4 (Note: Appearances in the UEFA Europa Conference League)	0	1 (Note: Appearance in the President of Ireland's Cup)	0	30	0
Derby County (loan)	2022–23	League One	0	0	0	0	0	0	—		0	0	0	0
St Patrick's Athletic	2024	LOI Premier Division	12	0	1	0	—		6 (Note: Appearances in the UEFA Conference League)	0	0 (Note: Appearances in the Leinster Senior Cup)	0	19	0
St Patrick's Athletic	2025	LOI Premier Division	36	0	3	0	—		6	0	1	0	46	0
St Patrick's Athletic	2026	LOI Premier Division	32	0	3	0	—		—		0	0	35	0
St Patrick's Athletic	Total		80	0	7	0	–		12	0	1	0	100	0
Career total			117	0	9	0	2	0	16	0	9	0	153	0

=== International ===
As of match played 14 November 2025

Appearances and goals by national team and year
National team	Year	Apps	Goals
Ghana
Ghana	2025	1	0
Total		1	0

== Honours ==
Individual

- PFAI Team of the Year: 2026
- St Patrick's Athletic Player of the Year: 2026
