= John Connolly (Irish footballer) =

Irish former footballer

John Connolly (born 28th December 1971) is an Irish footballer who plays as a goalkeeper

After playing as a schoolboy for Cherry Orchard Connolly signed for Bohemians in summer 1990 as cover for Dermot O'Neill. When O'Neill left for Derry City, John became first choice and was in goal when Bohs won the FAI Cup in 1992. He also had spells at Shelbourne and Dundalk (where he won another FAI Cup in 2002), Newry City and Institute.

== Honours ==
- FAI Cup: 2
  - Bohemians - 1992
  - Dundalk - 2002
- League of Ireland First Division: 1
  - Dundalk - 2000/01
