= Dean McMenamy =

Irish footballer

Personal information
- Full name: Dean McMenamy
- Date of birth: 4 April 2002 (age 24)
- Place of birth: Dublin, Ireland
- Position: Midfielder

Team information
- Current team: Waterford
- Number: 27

Youth career
- Shamrock Rovers

Senior career*
Years	Team	Apps	(Gls)
2020	Shamrock Rovers II	13	(0)
2021–2022	Shamrock Rovers	1	(0)
2022	→ Longford Town (loan)	27	(1)
2023–2026	Waterford	110	(9)
- * Club domestic league appearances and goals as of 11:55, 9 November 2026 (UTC)

Dean McMenamy (born 4 April 2002) is an Irish professional footballer who plays as a midfielder. He has previously played for Shamrock Rovers, Longford Town and Waterford.

== Club career ==
=== Youth career ===
McMenamy joined the academy of League of Ireland club Shamrock Rovers in 2017, playing with the Under-15 side, then played for the Under-17s from 2018 to 2019 and the Under-19s in 2020 and 2021.

=== Shamrock Rovers ===
McMenamy made 13 appearances in the 2020 League of Ireland First Division for the club's reserve side Shamrock Rovers II. On 16 July 2021, he made his first team debut for Shamrock Rovers, replacing Aaron Greene from the bench in the 86th minute of a 4–2 league win away to Derry City in what proved to be his only appearance for the club.

==== Longford Town loan ====
On 6 January 2022, McMenamy joined League of Ireland First Division club Longford Town on a season long loan deal. On 16 July 2022, he scored the first goal of his career at senior level, in a 3–1 defeat at home to Athlone Town. He made a total of 30 appearances during his loan spell with the club as they reached the Playoffs but failed to secure promotion.

=== Waterford ===
On 22 December 2022, McMenamy signed for League of Ireland First Division club Waterford ahead of their 2023 campaign. He scored 5 goals in 31 appearances in all competitions in his opening season with the club and was part of the team that defeated Cork City 2–1 after extra time in the 2023 League of Ireland Promotion/Relegation Playoff to win promotion to the League of Ireland Premier Division. On 6 May 2024, McMenamy scored his first Premier Division goal, in a 3–1 win away to his old club Shamrock Rovers at Tallaght Stadium. On 26 June 2024, he scored in a 2–0 win away to Dundalk at Oriel Park. On 14 November 2024, he signed a new one-year contract with the club. McMenamy made 31 appearances in all competitions in 2025, as he helped his side to preserve their Premier Division status by beating Bray Wanderers 2–1 in the 2025 League of Ireland Promotion/Relegation Playoff at Tolka Park. On 21 November 2025, he signed a new contract with the club. On 8 November 2026, he replaced Jørgen Voilås from the bench in the 2026 FAI Cup final as his side were defeated 1–0 by Derry City at the Aviva Stadium. On 11 November 2026, it was announced that McMenamy would be leaving the club following the end of his contract, having scored 9 goals in 130 appearances during his 4 seasons with the Blues.

== Career statistics ==
As of match played 8 November 2026

Appearances and goals by club, season and competition
Club	Season	League			National Cup		Other		Total	
Club	Season	Division	Apps	Goals	Apps	Goals	Apps	Goals	Apps	Goals
Shamrock Rovers II	2020	LOI First Division	13	0	—		—		13	0
Shamrock Rovers	2021	LOI Premier Division	1	0	0	0	0	0	1	0
Longford Town (loan)	2022	LOI First Division	27	1	1	0	2 (Note: Appearances in the 2022 League of Ireland Promotion Playoffs)	0	30	1
Waterford	2023	LOI First Division	24	5	1	0	6 (Note: 2 appearances in the Munster Senior Cup; 4 appearances in the 2023 League of Ireland Promotion Playoffs)	0	31	5
Waterford	2024	LOI Premier Division	28	3	2	0	2 (Note: Appearance(s) in the Munster Senior Cup)	0	32	3
Waterford	2025	LOI Premier Division	28	0	2	0	1 (Note: Appearance in the 2025 League of Ireland Promotion/Relegation Playoff)	0	31	0
Waterford	2026	LOI Premier Division	30	1	5	0	1	0	36	1
Waterford	Total		110	9	10	0	10	0	130	9
Career total			151	10	11	0	12	0	174	10
