= Cherry Orchard F.C. =

Association football club in Ireland

Cherry Orchard
- Full name: Cherry Orchard Football Club
- Nickname: The Orchard
- Founded: 1957
- Ground: Elmdale Crescent; Le Fanu Park
- League: Leinster Senior League (LSL); Dublin and District Schoolboys/Girl' League (DDSL); Athletic Union League (AUL)
- Website: www.cherryorchardfc.ie
Home colours	Away colours

Cherry Orchard Football Club is an Irish association football club based in Cherry Orchard, a Dublin suburb located near the townland of Ballyfermot Upper in Dublin. Their senior team plays in the Leinster Senior League (LSL). They have also competed in the FAI Cup, the FAI Intermediate Cup, the FAI Junior Cup and the Leinster Senior Cup.

The club also has reserve teams playing in the LSL and enter teams in the Dublin and District Schoolboys/Girls League (DDSL). A number of players, who progressed through the Cherry Orchard youth system, have gone onto play for professional clubs in Ireland and the United Kingdom. Several have also represented the Republic of Ireland national team at international level.

== History ==
=== Senior teams ===
When Cherry Orchard was formed in 1957, it initially only organised adult teams. They began playing in the Leinster Alliance League and then the Leinster Junior League before switching to the Athletic Union League in the mid-1960s. Cherry Orchard (also known as Orchard) first won a national competition in the 1981-1982 season, when they won the FAI Junior Cup. They also won the FAI Junior Cup, three times in a row, between the 1984-1985 and 1986–1987 seasons. They also won it twice in a row in 1989–1990 and 1990–1991. During this time, Orchard also won the Athletic Union League five times.

Following this, the club decided to move from junior football to intermediate-level and joined the Leinster Senior League (LSL) for the 1992–93 season. In their first season in the Leinster Senior League, Orchard were inaugural winners of the Charlie Cahill Cup and gained promotion to the league's top division, the LSL Senior Division. In 1993–94, Orchard marked their debut season in the division by winning the title, their first LSL Senior Division trophy. In the 2015–16 season, the club won the Leinster Senior League Senior 1 Sunday Division and the Charlie Cahill Cup double.

=== Youth academy ===
Cherry Orchard first began to field schoolboy teams in 1970. In the decades since, Orchard have won several schoolboy and youth league and cup competitions at both provincial and national level. In 1993, Cherry Orchard also won the Milk Cup, beating Rangers F.C. 4–2 on penalties after a 1–1 draw in the final played before a crowd of 10,000 at the Coleraine Showgrounds. All the previous winners of the Milk Cup had been academy teams of top clubs from England and Scotland.

A number of Cherry Orchard youth players have played on Republic of Ireland youth teams. In 1998, when the Republic of Ireland won both the UEFA European Under-16 Championship and the UEFA European Under-18 Championship, both teams included former Orchard players. Andy Reid played in the under-16 team, while Alan Quinn scored in the under-18 final against Germany.

Jessie Stapleton, who later played with West Ham United and the Republic of Ireland women's national football team, also started at Cherry Orchard.

== Grounds ==
Cherry Orchard play their home games at Elmdale, the Lawns (Le Fanu Park) and at St. John's College in Ballyfermot. The facility in Elmdale has an AstroTurf pitch.

== Notable former players ==
Republic of Ireland internationals

- Keith Fahey
- Stephen Gleeson
- Wayne Henderson
- Dave Langan
- Alan Quinn
- Andy Reid
- Stephen Quinn
- Glenn Whelan
- Conor Sammon
- Enda Stevens
- Anthony Stokes
- Mark Travers
- Mark O'Brien
- Jonny Hayes
- Nathan Collins
- Sinclair Armstrong
- James Abankwah

Republic of Ireland women internationals

- Jessica Stapleton

League of Ireland XI representatives

- Jackie Jameson
- Conor Kenna
- Aidan Price

Republic of Ireland B internationals

- Seán Dillon
- Paddy McCarthy
- Ger O'Brien
- Tony Scully

Republic of Ireland U23 international

- Greg Bolger
- Brendan Clarke
- Conor Kenna
- Ger O'Brien

Republic of Ireland U21 internationals

- James Abankwah
- Sinclair Armstrong
- Conor Clifford
- Nathan Collins
- Seán Dillon
- Jon Daly
- Dean Delany
- Mark Dempsey
- Lee Desmond
- Gary Dicker
- Willo Flood
- Danny Kane
- Stephen Maher
- Paddy McCarthy
- Shane McFaul
- Jamie McGrath
- Brandon Miele
- Mark O'Brien
- Stephen Paisley
- Conor Pepper
- Ben Quinn
- Shane Redmond
- Tony Scully
- Mark Yeates

Republic of Ireland U19 internationals

- James Abankwah
- Glory Nzingo
- Sinclair Armstrong
- Robert Bayly
- John Connolly
- Glenn Cronin
- Gary Dicker
- Derek Doyle
- Evan Finnegan
- Tommy Lonergan
- Sean Long
- John O'Sullivan

Republic of Ireland U18 internationals

- James Abankwah
- Tommy Lonergan
- Ben Quinn
- Luke Turner

Republic of Ireland U17 internationals

- Sinclair Armstrong
- Gary Dempsey
- David Freeman
- Darragh Markey
- John O'Sullivan
- Luke Turner

Republic of Ireland U16 internationals

- James Abankwah
- Tommy Lonergan
- Glory Nzingo
- John O'Sullivan
- Barry Prenderville
- Ben Quinn
- Luke Turner

Republic of Ireland U15 international

- James Abankwah
- Glory Nzingo
- Ben Quinn

Republic of Ireland futsal international

- Dane Massey

Ireland national Australian rules football team player

- Paul Sharry

== Honours ==
=== Senior ===
- Leinster Senior League
  - Winners: 1993–94, 1994–95, 1996–97, 2000–01, 2001–02, 2006–07: 6
  - Runners-up: 1995–96, 1998–99, 2012–13: 3
- Athletic Union League
  - Winners: 1981–82, 1984–85, 1987–88, 1989–90, 1991–92: 5
- FAI Intermediate Cup
  - Winners: 1997–98
  - Runners-up: 2001–02, 2010–11, 2011–12: 3
- FAI Junior Cup
  - Winners: 1981–82, 1984–85, 1985–86, 1986–87, 1989–90, 1990–91, 1994–95: 7
  - Runners-up: 1977–78: 1
- Leinster Senior Cup
  - Runners-up: 1997–98: 1

=== Youth ===
- FAI Youth Cup
  - Winners: 1989–90, 1992–93: 2
- FAI Under-17 Cup
  - Winners: 1988–89, 1992–93, 1993–94, 1994–95, 1996–97, 1998–99, 2002–03, 2013–14: 8
  - Runners-up: 2012–13: 1
- Milk Cup
  - Winners: 1992–93: 1
