= Sam Rooney =

Irish footballer (born 2008)

Personal information
- Full name: Samuel Rooney
- Date of birth: 24 November 2008 (age 17)
- Place of birth: Tallaght, County Dublin, Ireland
- Position: Forward

Team information
- Current team: St Patrick's Athletic
- Number: 35

Youth career
- 2012–2013: Kilnamanagh
- 2013: Shamrock Rovers
- 2013–2022: St Kevin's Boys
- 2023–: St Patrick's Athletic

Senior career*
| Years | Team | Apps | (Gls) |
| 2025– | St Patrick's Athletic | 7 | (0) |

International career^{‡}
| 2023 | Republic of Ireland U15 | 1 | (1) |
| 2024 | Republic of Ireland U16 | 3 | (0) |
| 2024 | Republic of Ireland U17 | 1 | (0) |
| 2026– | Republic of Ireland U19 | 3 | (0) |
- * Club domestic league appearances and goals as of 00:48, 29 August 2026 (UTC) ‡ National team caps and goals as of 22:26, 4 October 2026 (UTC)

Samuel Rooney (born 24 November 2008) is an Irish professional footballer who plays as a forward for League of Ireland Premier Division club St Patrick's Athletic.

== Club career ==
=== Early career ===
A native of Tallaght, County Dublin, Rooney attended school at Tallaght Community School. He had short stints playing for local clubs Kilnamanagh and Shamrock Rovers as a five year old, before joining St Kevin's Boys, where he remained until joining the academy at League of Ireland club St Patrick's Athletic in January 2023 and hit the ground running, scoring an impressive 38 goals for the club's Under-15 side on the way to winning the league with them. In 2024, Rooney was a ball boy for the first team's UEFA Conference League fixtures, in which he drew inspiration from fellow striker and teenager Mason Melia as well as club captain Joe Redmond.

=== St Patrick's Athletic ===
In April 2025, Rooney signed his first professional contract with St Patrick's Athletic. In September 2025, he drew reported interest from Nottingham Forest, Sporting Lisbon and Atalanta. On 10 October 2025, Rooney made his senior debut for the club, replacing Chris Forrester from the bench in a 4–0 win over St Mochta's in the semi-final of the 2024–25 Leinster Senior Cup. On 27 April 2026, Rooney scored the first goals of his senior career with a hat-trick in a 5–0 win over Blackrock College in the Leinster Senior Cup, at 17 years, 5 months and 3 days old, becoming the youngest ever player to do so for the club at senior level. On 8 May 2026, he made his senior league debut for the club, replacing Barry Baggley from the bench in a 4–1 win over Waterford at Richmond Park. On 26 May 2026, he scored in a 1–0 win away to Dundalk in the Leinster Senior Cup Semi-final at Oriel Park. On 19 June 2026, he provided his first assist at senior level when he came off the bench to set up Chris Forrester's injury time goal against Sligo Rovers to secure a 2–0 win. On 30 June 2026, he opened the scoring in a 2–1 loss away to Bray Wanderers in the Final of the 2025–26 Leinster Senior Cup, his fifth goal in as many appearances in the competition. On 16 August 2026, he came off the bench to score the winning goal in a 3–2 win over Shamrock Rovers after extra time in the Third Round of the FAI Cup. On 10 October 2026, he suffered a dislocated shoulder injury in an U20s game against Bohemians that would require surgery, meaning he would miss the rest of the season as a result.

== International career ==
Rooney received his first international call-up in March 2023, for the Republic of Ireland U15 side's friendlies against Latvia U15. He came on at half time in the second friendly against Latvia U15s on 23 March 2023, scoring on his debut in a 6–0 win for his side. On 9 May 2024, Rooney made his Republic of Ireland U16 debut in a 3–2 defeat to Switzerland U16 in Portugal. He made his Republic of Ireland U17 debut on 8 September 2024 in a 2–0 loss to Denmark U17 in Spain. On 25 September 2026, Rooney made his Republic of Ireland U19 debut in a 1–0 defeat in a friendly away to England U19.

== Career statistics ==
As of match played on 28 August 2026

Appearances and goals by club, season and competition
| Club | Season | League | | | National Cup (Note: Includes FAI Cup) | | Other | | Total | |
| Club | Season | Division | Apps | Goals | Apps | Goals | Apps | Goals | Apps | Goals |
|---|---|---|---|---|---|---|---|---|---|---|
| St Patrick's Athletic | 2025 | LOI Premier Division | 0 | 0 | 0 | 0 | 1 (Note: Appearances in the Leinster Senior Cup) | 0 | 1 | 0 |
| St Patrick's Athletic | 2026 | LOI Premier Division | 7 | 0 | 1 | 1 | 5 | 5 | 13 | 6 |
| Career total | | | 7 | 0 | 1 | 1 | 6 | 5 | 14 | 6 |
