= John O'Sullivan (footballer, born 2006) =

Irish footballer (born 2006)

Personal information
- Full name: John O'Riley-O'Sullivan
- Date of birth: 29 January 2006 (age 20)
- Place of birth: Ringsend, County Dublin, Ireland
- Position: Midfielder

Team information
- Current team: Shamrock Rovers
- Number: 26

Youth career
- Cambridge Boys
- –2019: Cherry Orchard
- 2019–: Shamrock Rovers

Senior career*
Years	Team	Apps	(Gls)
2023–	Shamrock Rovers	30	(0)
2024	→ Bray Wanderers (loan)	9	(1)
2025	→ Drogheda United (loan)	3	(0)

International career^{‡}
2022	Republic of Ireland U16		
2022–2023	Republic of Ireland U17	2	(0)
2024	Republic of Ireland U19	3	(0)
2026–	Republic of Ireland U21	2	(0)
- * Club domestic league appearances and goals as of 17:31, 9 November 2026 ‡ National team caps and goals as of 22:14, 9 June 2026 (UTC)

John O'Riley-O'Sullivan (born 29 January 2006) is an Irish professional footballer who plays as a midfielder for League of Ireland Premier Division club Shamrock Rovers.

== Career ==
=== Youth career ===
Ringsend man O'Sullivan began playing schoolboy football with local club Cambridge Boys, before moving to Cherry Orchard and then in 2019 he joined the academy of League of Ireland club Shamrock Rovers, playing for their under-13 side in his first year, then moving up to their under-15s in 2021 and training with the first team during pre-season of 2022, before playing for the club's under-17 and under-20 teams.

=== Shamrock Rovers ===
On 13 March 2023, O'Sullivan made his senior debut for Shamrock Rovers in a 2–1 loss away to Bray Wanderers in a Leinster Senior Cup tie at the Carlisle Grounds. He made his league debut for the club on 29 April 2024, replacing Daniel Cleary from the bench in a 4–0 win over Drogheda United at Tallaght Stadium.

==== Bray Wanderers loan ====
On 28 July 2024, he was loaned out to League of Ireland First Division club Bray Wanderers until the end of the season. He made his debut for the club 2 August 2024, opening the scoring in a 2–1 win away to Finn Harps. On 2 November 2024, O'Sullivan scored the winning penalty in a shootout win over Athlone Town at Dalymount Park to earn his side a place in the 2024 League of Ireland Promotion/Relegation Final against Drogheda United.

==== Return from loan ====
O'Sullivan returned to Rovers after his loan spell and on 20 February 2025, O'Sullivan made his European debut, coming off the bench in extra time against Molde of Norway and scoring his penalty in the shootout as his side were defeated and knocked out of the UEFA Conference League at the Knockout Phase Playoff stage.

==== Drogheda United loan ====
On 14 July 2025, O'Sullivan signed for fellow League of Ireland Premier Division side Drogheda United on loan until the end of the season. On 18 July 2025, he scored on hide debut for the club, in a 5–0 win at home to Crumlin United in the first game of his side's FAI Cup defence. He made a total of 6 appearances in all competitions during his loan spell spell, scoring once.

==== Return from loan ====
O'Sullivan played his first game since his loan when he came off the bench in a 2–0 win away to Sligo Rovers. The following week, he assisted Aaron Greene with a through ball in a 2–0 win over Galway United at Tallaght Stadium.

== International career ==
O'Sullivan has represented the Republic of Ireland at various underage levels. On 5 September 2024, he made his debut for the Republic of Ireland U19 team in a 2–1 loss to France U19 in Slovenia.

== Career statistics ==
As of match played on 23 October 2026

Appearances and goals by club, season and competition
Club	Season	League			National Cup (Note: Includes FAI Cup)		Europe		Other		Total	
Club	Season	Division	Apps	Goals	Apps	Goals	Apps	Goals	Apps	Goals	Apps	Goals
Shamrock Rovers	2023	LOI Premier Division	0	0	0	0	0 (Note: Appearance(s) in the UEFA Champions League)	0	1 (Note: Appearance(s) in the Leinster Senior Cup)	0	1	0
Shamrock Rovers	2024	LOI Premier Division	1	0	0	0	0	0	3	0	4	0
Shamrock Rovers	2025	LOI Premier Division	8	0	–		1 (Note: Appearance(s) in the UEFA Conference League)	0	0	0	9	0
Shamrock Rovers	2026	LOI Premier Division	21	0	2	0	4 (Note: 2 appearances in the UEFA Champions League; 1 appearance in the UEFA Europa League; 1 appearance in the UEFA Conference League)	0	0	0	27	0
Shamrock Rovers	Total		30	0	2	0	5	0	4	0	41	0
Bray Wanderers (loan)	2024	LOI First Division	9	1	–		–		4 (Note: Appearances in the 2024 League of Ireland Promotion Playoffs)	1	13	2
Drogheda United (loan)	2025	LOI Premier Division	3	0	2	1	–		1	0	6	1
Total			42	1	4	1	5	0	9	1	60	3

== Honours ==
Shamrock Rovers

- League of Ireland Premier Division: 2025, 2026
