= Barry Baggley =

Northern Irish footballer

Personal information
- Full name: Barry Thomas Crowe
- Date of birth: 11 January 2002 (age 24)
- Place of birth: Belfast, Northern Ireland
- Height: 1.76 m (5 ft 9 in)
- Position: Midfielder

Team information
- Current team: St Patrick's Athletic
- Number: 19

Youth career
- 2017–2018: Linfield
- 2018: Glentoran
- 2018–2019: Fleetwood Town

Senior career*
| Years | Team | Apps | (Gls) |
| 2019–2024 | Fleetwood Town | 12 | (1) |
| 2021 | → Altrincham (loan) | 2 | (1) |
| 2023 | → Waterford (loan) | 30 | (2) |
| 2024 | → Waterford (loan) | 18 | (0) |
| 2025– | St Patrick's Athletic | 66 | (1) |

International career^{‡}
| 2018–2019 | Northern Ireland U17 | 8 | (0) |
| 2019 | Northern Ireland U19 | 1 | (0) |
| 2021–2024 | Northern Ireland U21 | 7 | (1) |
- * Club domestic league appearances and goals as of 23:34, 30 October 2026 (UTC) ‡ National team caps and goals as of 19:59, 12 November 2024 (UTC)

Barry Thomas Crowe (born 11 January 2002), known as Barry Baggley, is a Northern Irish professional footballer who plays as a midfielder for League of Ireland Premier Division club St Patrick's Athletic.

== Early and personal life ==
Baggley is from the Turf Lodge area of Belfast. His father Barry Snr is an amateur football manager.

== Club career ==
=== Youth career ===
Baggley began his career at Linfield and Glentoran, moving to English club Fleetwood Town in September 2018 following two trial periods.

=== Fleetwood Town ===
After initially playing for the club's youth team, Baggley made his senior debut for Fleetwood Town on 9 March 2019, appearing as a late substitute in a 2–0 league defeat away at Walsall. In doing so he became Fleetwood's youngest ever league player, at the age of 17 years and 57 days. He was later praised by manager Joey Barton. In July 2021 he signed a new three-year contract with Fleetwood.

==== Altrincham loan ====
On 26 October 2021, Baggley joined National League side Altrincham on loan for one month. He scored on his debut for Altrincham against Solihull Moors, and returned to Fleetwood in November 2021 having made a further two appearances during the loan spell.

==== Waterford loans ====
In January 2023, he was loaned out to Fleetwood's sister club Waterford for a season long loan until the end of their League of Ireland First Division campaign in November. After returning to Fleetwood Town and featuring in a friendly against Waterford, it was announced on 18 January 2024 that Baggley would be returning to Waterford on a second loan spell for their 2024 League of Ireland Premier Division season following their promotion. He returned to Fleetwood Town in November 2024 following the end of his loan spell.

=== St Patrick's Athletic ===
On 3 December 2024, it was announced that Baggley had signed for League of Ireland Premier Division club St Patrick's Athletic on a long-term contract for an undisclosed fee. He scored his first goal for the club on 21 January 2025, in a 2–1 win at home to Bray Wanderers in the Leinster Senior Cup. On 10 July 2025, Baggley made the first appearance in European competition of his career in a 1–0 win over Hegelmann of Lithuania in the UEFA Conference League at Richmond Park. On 25 January 2026, Baggley scored his first goal of the season in a 5–0 win over Longford Town in the Leinster Senior Cup. On 21 August 2026, he scored his first league goal for the club, on his 60th league appearance, adding his side's second goal in the 92nd minute of a 2–0 win away to Drogheda United after coming off the bench.

== International career ==
Baggley has represented Northern Ireland at youth level up to the under-21 level.

== Career statistics ==
As of match played on 30 October 2026

Appearances and goals by club, season and competition
| Club | Season | League | | | National Cup | | League Cup | | Europe | | Other | | Total | |
| Club | Season | Division | Apps | Goals | Apps | Goals | Apps | Goals | Apps | Goals | Apps | Goals | Apps | Goals |
|---|---|---|---|---|---|---|---|---|---|---|---|---|---|---|
| Fleetwood Town | 2018–19 | League One | 3 | 0 | 0 | 0 | 0 | 0 | — | | 0 | 0 | 3 | 0 |
| Fleetwood Town | 2019–20 | League One | 0 | 0 | 0 | 0 | 0 | 0 | — | | 1 (Note: Appearance in EFL Trophy) | 0 | 1 | 0 |
| Fleetwood Town | 2020–21 | League One | 2 | 0 | 0 | 0 | 0 | 0 | — | | 1 | 0 | 3 | 0 |
| Fleetwood Town | 2021–22 | League One | 7 | 1 | — | | 0 | 0 | — | | 1 | 0 | 8 | 1 |
| Fleetwood Town | 2022–23 | League One | 0 | 0 | 0 | 0 | 0 | 0 | — | | 0 | 0 | 0 | 0 |
| Fleetwood Town | 2023–24 | League One | 0 | 0 | 0 | 0 | 0 | 0 | — | | 0 | 0 | 0 | 0 |
| Fleetwood Town | 2024–25 | League Two | 0 | 0 | 0 | 0 | 0 | 0 | — | | 0 | 0 | 0 | 0 |
| Fleetwood Town | Total | | 12 | 1 | 0 | 0 | 0 | 0 | 0 | 0 | 3 | 0 | 15 | 1 |
| Altrincham (loan) | 2021–22 | National League | 2 | 1 | 1 | 0 | — | | — | | — | | 3 | 1 |
| Waterford (loan) | 2023 | LOI First Division | 30 | 2 | 1 | 0 | — | | — | | 5 (Note: 1 appearance in Munster Senior Cup and 4 appearances in 2023 League of Ireland First Division Playoffs) | 0 | 36 | 2 |
| Waterford (loan) | 2024 | LOI Premier Division | 18 | 0 | 1 | 0 | — | | — | | 0 | 0 | 19 | 0 |
| St Patrick's Athletic | 2025 | LOI Premier Division | 32 | 0 | 2 | 0 | — | | 6 (Note: Appearances in the UEFA Conference League) | 0 | 5 (Note: Appearances in the Leinster Senior Cup) | 1 | 45 | 1 |
| St Patrick's Athletic | 2026 | LOI Premier Division | 34 | 1 | 2 | 0 | — | | — | | 1 | 1 | 37 | 2 |
| St Patrick's Athletic | Total | | 66 | 1 | 4 | 0 | 0 | 0 | 6 | 0 | 6 | 2 | 82 | 3 |
| Career total | | | 128 | 5 | 7 | 0 | 0 | 0 | 6 | 0 | 14 | 2 | 155 | 7 |
