= Tom Grivosti =

English footballer

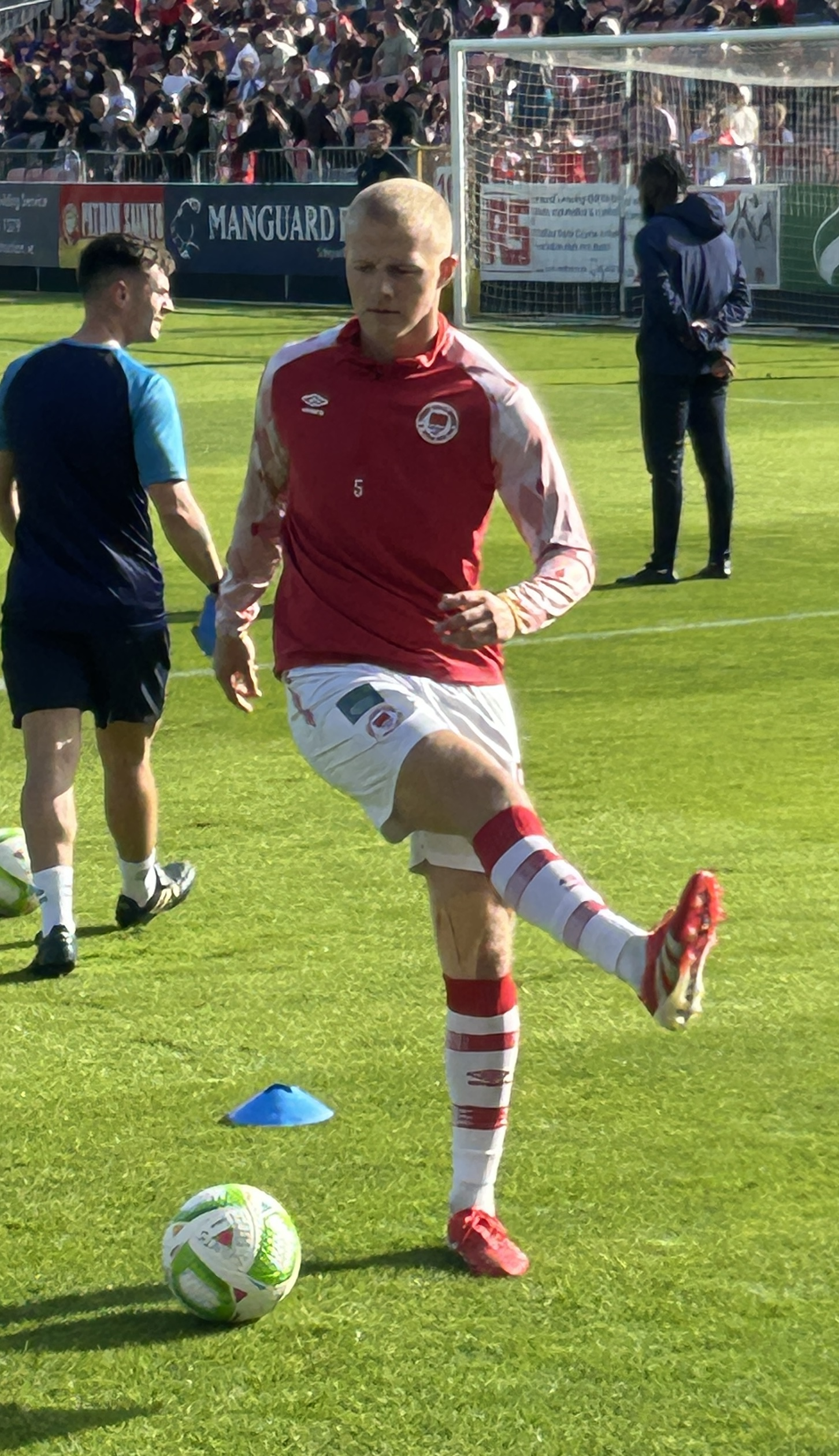
- Grivosti in a pre-match warmup for St Patrick's Athletic in 2025.

Personal information
- Date of birth: 15 June 1999 (age 27)
- Place of birth: Liverpool, England
- Position: Defender

Team information
- Current team: Dundalk
- Number: 44

Youth career
- 2004–2011: MSB Woolton
- 2011–2017: Bolton Wanderers
- 2017–2018: Ross County

Senior career*
Years	Team	Apps	(Gls)
2017	Bolton Wanderers	0	(0)
2017	→ Skelmersdale United (loan)	1	(0)
2018–2022	Ross County	28	(2)
2021–2022	→ Elgin City (loan)	12	(0)
2022–2026	St Patrick's Athletic	83	(2)
2026–	Dundalk	11	(0)
- * Club domestic league appearances and goals as of 13:44, 9 November 2026 (UTC)

Tom Grivosti (born 15 June 1999) is an English professional footballer who plays as a defender for League of Ireland Premier Division club Dundalk. He has previously played for Bolton Wanderers, Skelmersdale United, Ross County, Elgin City and St Patrick's Athletic.

== Career ==
=== Early career ===
Born and raised in Liverpool, Grivosti played for local side MSB Woolton from Under-6 level until moving to the youth academy at Bolton Wanderers. Grivosti was loaned out to Skelmersdale United in January 2017. He made one appearance for the club, a 4–1 loss to Blyth Spartans.

After being released by Bolton Wanderers in the summer of 2017, he signed for Scottish side Ross County where he initially played for their reserve side, winning the North of Scotland League.

=== Ross County ===
Grivosti made his senior debut for Ross County on 20 October 2018 against Ayr United in the Scottish Championship, coming on as a substitute for Callum Morris in the second half. He scored his first goal for Ross County in April 2019, in a 1–0 win against Dunfermline Athletic. On 30 October 2019, he suffered an injury in a game against Rangers which kept him out of action for a full calendar year.

==== Elgin City loan ====
On 1 September 2021 Grivosti was sent on loan to Scottish League Two side Elgin City until January 2022. He returned to Ross County after 13 appearances and 1 goal for Elgin in all competitions, with County manager Malky Mackay stating he was considering securing a loan move at a higher level for Grivosti during the January transfer window.

=== St Patrick's Athletic ===
==== 2022 season ====
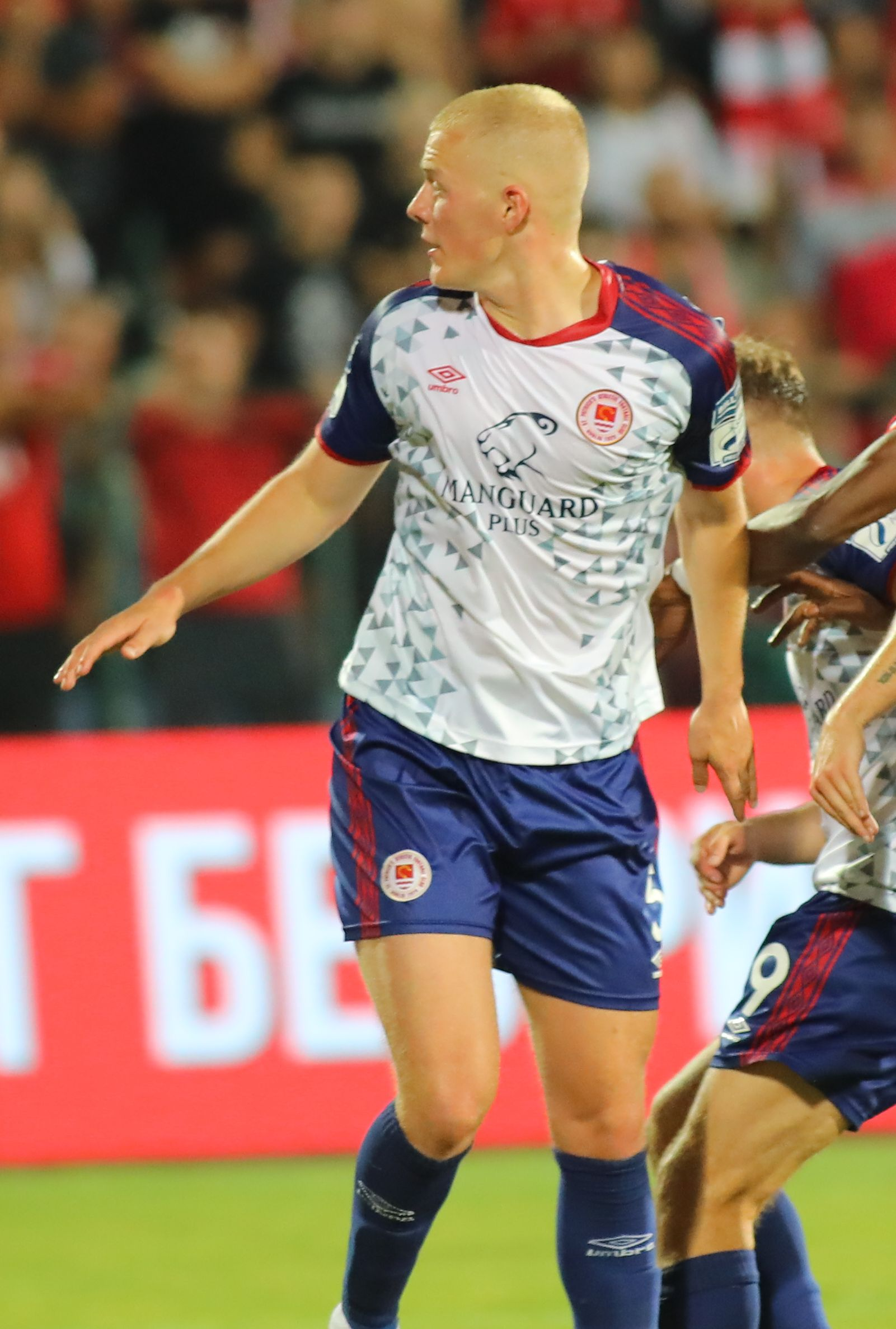
Grivosti in action away to CSKA Sofia in 2022.

On 20 January 2022, it was announced that Grivosti had signed for League of Ireland Premier Division club St Patrick's Athletic on a two-year-contract for an undisclosed fee. On 11 February 2022, he made his debut for the club in the 2022 President of Ireland's Cup against Shamrock Rovers at Tallaght Stadium, replacing the injured James Abankwah in the 76th minute as his side lost 5–4 on penalties after a 1–1 draw. Grivosti scored his first goal for the club on 18 March 2022, finding the top corner from the corner of the box in a 2–1 defeat away to Derry City at the Ryan McBride Brandywell Stadium. Grivosti made his first appearance in European football on 21 July 2022 in a 1–1 draw with Slovenian side NŠ Mura in the UEFA Europa Conference League. On 31 July 2022 he scored his first home goal at Richmond Park in an FAI Cup tie with Waterford.

==== 2023 season ====
On 26 May 2023, not long after recovering from a hamstring injury that kept him out for 2 months, Grivosti suffered a ruptured Anterior cruciate ligament in a 2–1 win over Dundalk, with the long term nature of the injury ending his season. During his time out injured, he missed out on his sides 3–1 victory over Bohemians in the 2023 FAI Cup Final at the Aviva Stadium, with Grivosti stating that due to his injury he didn't feel like he had won the cup. On 20 November 2023, despite still being injured, it was announced that Grivosti had signed a contract extension with the club.

==== 2024 season ====
On 24 May 2024, Grivosti made his first appearance for the club in 364 days when he came off the bench for Jason McClelland in the 66th minute of a 2–2 draw away to Bohemians at Dalymount Park. On 25 July 2024, he made his 100th career appearance in a 3–1 win at home to Vaduz of Liechtenstein in the UEFA Conference League. He featured in all 6 of the club's UEFA Conference League fixtures as they knocked out Vaduz, then Sabah of Azerbaijan, before losing 2–0 on aggregate to Turkey's İstanbul Başakşehir in the Play-off Round. On 5 September 2024, Grivosti scored his first goal since his return from injury, with an overhead kick to equalise in an eventual 2–1 win away to Dundalk at Oriel Park.

==== 2025 season ====
On 25 November 2024, Grivosti signed a new two-year contract with the club. Grivosti made his 100th appearance for the club in all competitions on 24 October 2025 in a 1–1 draw at home to Waterford at Richmond Park. He featured in all 6 of his side's UEFA Conference League campaign, which saw them beat Lithuanian side Hegelmann 1–0 at home and 2–0 away before beating Estonian club Nõmme Kalju 1–0 at home then drawing 2–2 away in the second leg after extra time to send them through. The Third Qualifying Round saw them face Turkish giants Beşiktaş, in which they found themselves 4–0 down at half time in the first leg at Tallaght Stadium, then won the second half by a goal, before remarkably taking a 2–0 lead at Beşiktaş Stadium in the second leg to narrow the aggregate deficit to just 1 goal with 48 minutes of the tie left, although eventually they were defeated 3–2 on the night and 7–3 on aggregate.

==== 2026 season ====
The 2026 season saw Grivosti struggle for minutes, making just 10 appearances in the club's first 25 league games of the season, before it was announced on 28 July 2026 that he would be transferred, after making 112 appearances in all competitions during his 4-and-a-half years with the club, scoring 3 goals.

=== Dundalk ===
On 28 July 2026, Grivosti signed for League of Ireland Premier Division club Dundalk on a multi-year contract.

== Career statistics ==
As of match played 30 October 2026

Appearances and goals by club, season and competition
Club	Season	League			National cup		League cup		Europe		Other		Total	
Club	Season	Division	Apps	Goals	Apps	Goals	Apps	Goals	Apps	Goals	Apps	Goals	Apps	Goals
Bolton Wanderers	2016–17	EFL League One	0	0	0	0	0	0	–		0	0	0	0
Skelmersdale United (loan)	2016–17	Northern Premier League	1	0	–		–		–		–		1	0
Ross County	2018–19	Scottish Championship	17	1	0	0	0	0	–		2 (Note: Appearances in Scottish Challenge Cup)	0	19	1
Ross County	2019–20	Scottish Premiership	6	0	0	0	2	0	–		–		8	0
Ross County	2020–21	Scottish Premiership	5	1	0	0	2	1	–		–		7	2
Ross County	2021–22	Scottish Premiership	0	0	0	0	0	0	–		–		0	0
Ross County	Total		28	2	0	0	4	1	–		2	0	34	3
Elgin City (loan)	2021–22	Scottish League Two	12	0	0	0	–		–		1	1	13	1
St Patrick's Athletic	2022	LOI Premier Division	30	1	1	1	–		4 (Note: Appearances in the UEFA Europa Conference League)	0	1 (Note: Appearance in the President of Ireland's Cup)	0	36	2
St Patrick's Athletic	2023	LOI Premier Division	8	0	0	0	–		0	0	0 (Note: Appearances in the Leinster Senior Cup)	0	8	0
St Patrick's Athletic	2024	LOI Premier Division	14	1	1	0	—		6 (Note: Appearance(s) in the UEFA Conference League)	0	1	0	22	1
St Patrick's Athletic	2025	LOI Premier Division	21	0	3	0	—		6	0	4	0	34	0
St Patrick's Athletic	2026	LOI Premier Division	10	0	1	0	—		—		1	0	12	0
St Patrick's Athletic	Total		83	2	6	1	–		16	0	7	0	112	3
Dundalk	2026	LOI Premier Division	11	0	–		–		–		–		11	0
Career total			135	4	6	1	4	1	16	0	10	1	171	7

== Honours ==
Ross County

- Scottish Championship: 2018–19
- Scottish Challenge Cup: 2018–19

St Patrick's Athletic

- FAI Cup: 2023
- Leinster Senior Cup: 2023–24
