= Jørgen Voilås =

Norwegian footballer (born 1998)

Personal information
- Date of birth: 22 July 1998 (age 28)
- Place of birth: Norway
- Height: 1.84 m (6 ft 0 in)
- Position: Winger

Team information
- Current team: Waterford
- Number: 20

Youth career
- –2012: Vard
- 2012–2017: Djerv 1919

Senior career*
Years	Team	Apps	(Gls)
2015–2017	Djerv 1919	7	(4)
2018	Vard	21	(5)
2019	Djerv 1919	26	(13)
2020–2021	Notodden	39	(14)
2022	Bryne	24	(1)
2023–2024	Egersund	39	(3)
2025	Umeå FC	30	(4)
2026–	Waterford	32	(4)
- * Club domestic league appearances and goals as of 11:42, 8 November 2026 (UTC)

Jørgen Voilås (born 22 July 1998) is a Norwegian professional footballer who plays as a winger for League of Ireland Premier Division club Waterford.

== Early life ==
Voilås was born on 22 July 2008. Born in Norway, he is the grandson of Solveig.

== Career ==
As a youth player, Voilås joined the youth academy of Norwegian side Djerv 1919 and was promoted to the club's senior team in 2015, where he made seven league appearances and scored four goals. Ahead of the 2018 season, he signed for Norwegian side Vard, where he made twenty-one league appearances and scored five goals. One year later, he returned to Norwegian side Djerv 1919, where he made twenty-six league appearances and scored thirteen goals, before signing for Norwegian side Notodden in 2020, where he made thirty-nine league appearances and scored fourteen goals.

Two years later, he signed for Norwegian side Bryne, where he made twenty-four league appearances and scored one goal. During the spring of 2023, he signed for Norwegian side Egersund, where he made thirty-nine league appearances and scored three goals. Following his stint there, he signed for Swedish side Umeå FC, where he made thirty league appearances and scored four goals.

On 20 January 2026, Voilås signed for League of Ireland Premier Division club Waterford in 2026. On 8 November 2026, he started in the 2026 FAI Cup final as his side were defeated 1–0 by Derry City at the Aviva Stadium. On 11 November 2026, he signed a new contract with the club.

== Style of play ==
Voilås plays as a winger. Irish newspaper Waterford News & Star wrote in 2026 that his "pace and eye for a goal... [is] a big asset".
