= 2026 FAI Cup =

Tournament details
- Country: Republic of Ireland
- Dates: 10 May – 8 November 2026
- Teams: 44

Final positions
- Champions: Derry City (7th title)
- Runners-up: Waterford

Tournament statistics
- Matches played: 41

The 2026 FAI Cup, known as the Club Orange FAI Cup for sponsorship reasons, was the 106th edition of the Republic of Ireland's primary domestic association football cup competition. It featured teams from the League of Ireland Premier Division and the First Division, as well as teams from the regional leagues of the Republic of Ireland football league system.

RTÉ broadcast a record number of FAI Cup ties including one second round fixture, one third round fixture, two quarter-final fixtures, both semi-final fixtures, and the final.

The 2026 FAI Cup winners are set to enter the first qualifying round of the 2027–28 UEFA Europa League.

== Round and dates ==
Round	Draw date	Match dates	Number of fixtures	Teams	New entries this round
First Round	2 April	10–23 May	12	44 → 32	24
Second Round	3 June	17-19 July	16	32 → 16	20
Third Round	21 July	14-16 August	8	16 → 8	None
Quarter-finals	18 August	4–6 September	4	8 → 4	None
Semi-finals	7 September	11-13 October	2	4 → 2	None
Final	—	8 November	1	2 → 1	None

== Teams ==
The 2026 FAI Cup is a knockout competition with 44 teams taking part. The competitors consist of the 20 teams from the League of Ireland and 24 teams from the regional leagues of the Republic of Ireland football league system.

League of Ireland Premier Division clubs
Bohemians	Derry City	Drogheda United	Dundalk	Galway United
Shamrock Rovers	Shelbourne	Sligo Rovers	St Patrick's Athletic	Waterford
League of Ireland First Division clubs
Athlone Town	Bray Wanderers	Cobh Ramblers	Cork City	Finn Harps
Kerry	Longford Town	Treaty United	UCD	Wexford
Provincial league clubs
Baldoyle United (Leinster Senior League)	Bangor Celtic (Leinster Senior League)	Castlebar Celtic (Mayo Association Football League)	College Corinthians (Munster Senior League)	Crumlin United (Leinster Senior League)
Douglas Hall (Munster Senior League)	Fairview Rangers (Limerick & District League)	Fanad United (Donegal Junior League)	Janesboro (Limerick & District League)	Killester Donnycarney (Leinster Senior League)
Liffey Wanderers (Leinster Senior League)	Leicester Celtic (Leinster Senior League)	Lucan United (Leinster Senior League)	Mayfield United (Munster Senior League)	Midleton (Munster Senior League)
North End United (Wexford Football League)	Ringmahon Rangers (Munster Senior League)	River Valley Rangers (Leinster Senior League)	Salthill Devon (Galway & District League)	St Mochta's (Leinster Senior League)
St Michael's (Tipperary South District League)	Tolka Rovers (Leinster Senior League)	UCC (Munster Senior League)	Usher Celtic (Leinster Senior League)	Wayside Celtic (Leinster Senior League)

== First round ==
The first round consisted of the clubs who reached the last 16 of the 2025 FAI Intermediate Cup and the eight quarter-finalists from the 2025 FAI Junior Cup.

10 May	Bangor Celtic	4–1	Rivervalley Rangers	Crumlin, Dublin 12
11:00	Daniel Mullen 18'; Troy Stedman 29'; Hayden Roche 70'; Cian Maher 90+1'	Report	Chris Burgess 4'	Stadium: Transport Club; Attendance: 56; Referee: Alan Carey

14 May	Midleton	2–0	Mayfield United	Midleton, County Cork
20:00	Jake Hegarty 57' 90+3'	Report		Stadium: Knockgriffin Park; Referee: Allan Martin

15 May	Wayside Celtic	3–4	St Mochta's	Kilternan, Dublin 18
19:45	Cormac Kelly 14' 71'; Sean Schutte 27'	Report	Billy Gilmore 4'; Michael Scott 41'; Aaron Robinson 45'; Chris Lotefa 67'	Stadium: Jackson Park; Referee: David Gallagher

16 May	Liffey Wanderers	1–1 (a.e.t.) (3–4 p)	Ringmahon Rangers	Ringsend, Dublin 4
13:00	Evan Harte 62'	Report	Luke Kiely 75'	Stadium: Irishtown Stadium; Attendance: 152; Referee: Declan Troy

16 May	St Michael's	1–3 (a.e.t.)	Janesboro	Tipperary, County Tipperary
14:00	Luke Ryan (yellow card) 86' (yellow-red card); Daniel O'Dwyer 90+1'; Colin Bargary (yellow card) 119' (yellow-red card)	Report	Josh O'Rahilly 12'; Gavin Carrig (red card) 75'; Shane Clarke (red card) 85'; Eoghan Brady (yellow card) 89' (yellow-red card); Dylan Moriarty 98' 120+4' (pen.)	Stadium: Cooke Park; Referee: Michael Corrigan

16 May	Castlebar Celtic	w/o	North End United	Castlebar, County Mayo
17:00		Report		Stadium: Celtic Park
Note: Castlebar Celtic advance as North End United withdraw citing fixture congestion

16 May	Fairview Rangers	0–3	Tolka Rovers	Garryowen, County Limerick
17:00		Report	Tyrick Reilly 18'; Dylan Fox 56'; Ryan Boyle 90'	Stadium: Fairgreen; Attendance: 73; Referee: Mark Kennedy

17 May	Douglas Hall	1–0	Fanad United	Douglas, County Cork
12:00	Ben Roche-O'Brien 77'	Report	Adam Carr (red card) 90+7'	Stadium: Monegourney; Attendance: 25; Referee: Robert O'Leary

17 May	Baldoyle United	2–0	Leicester Celtic	Baldoyle, Dublin 13
14:00	Alex Mooney 24'; Cian Leeson 86'	Report		Stadium: Brookstone Road; Attendance: 270; Referee: Colin Duffy

17 May	College Corinthians	2–1	Killester Donnycarney	Douglas, County Cork
14:00	Keelan Crowley 59' 71'; Faruq Adegboyega (yellow card) 88' (yellow-red card)	Report	Cian Whelan 13'	Stadium: Corinthians Park; Referee: Darren O'Sullivan

17 May	Lucan United	5–2 (a.e.t.)	UCC	Westmanstown, Dublin 15
14:00	Andrade Leonardo 73'; Gary Gannon 90+3'; Conor Clifford 105' (pen.); Marco Chindea 113'; Taylor Mooney 117'	Report	Ronan O'Shea 61'; Sam Bailey 68'; Ronan O'Shea (yellow card) 118' (yellow-red card)	Stadium: Westmanstown Sports Centre; Referee: John McCarthy

23 May	Crumlin United	4–0	Salthill Devon	Crumlin, Dublin 12
17:00	Cian Kenna 6'; Cian Kenna 55'; Jude Healy 67'; Greg Moorhouse 90+2'	Report		Stadium: Pearse Park; Referee: Declan Troy

== Second round ==
The League of Ireland teams entered in the second round.

17 July	Athlone Town	3–0	Midleton	Athlone, County Westmeath
19:45	Patrick Ferry 11' (pen.); Aaron Connolly 52'; Josh Farnham 80'	Report		Stadium: Athlone Town Stadium; Attendance: 320; Referee: Oliver Moran

17 July	Drogheda United	4–0	Lucan United	Drogheda, County Louth
19:45	Mark Doyle 3'; Mark Doyle 44'; Stephen Odiashi 49' (o.g.); Thomas Oluwa 62' (pen.)	Report	Stephen Odiashi (yellow card) 76' (yellow-red card)	Stadium: Sullivan & Lambe Park; Attendance: 1,282; Referee: Daryl Carolan

17 July	Finn Harps	0–1	Bray Wanderers	Ballybofey, County Donegal
19:45		Report	Conor Knight 90+3'	Stadium: Finn Park; Attendance: 602; Referee: Paul McLaughlin

17 July	Galway United	4–0	Crumlin United	Salthill, County Galway
19:45	Matty Wolfe 11' (pen.); Francely Lomboto 24'; Matty Wolfe 38'; Stephen Walsh 50'	Report		Stadium: Pearse Stadium; Attendance: 672; Referee: Declan Toland
Note: Fixture played in Pearse Stadium due to pitch work at Galway United's regular home venue of Eamonn Deacy Park.

17 July	Kerry	2–2 (a.e.t.) (6–5 p)	Shelbourne	Tralee, County Kerry
19:45	Sean O'Connell 77'; Cian Murphy 78'	Report	Odhrán Casey (yellow card) 52' (yellow-red card); Daniel Kelly 60'; Jack Henry-Francis 90+3'	Stadium: Mounthawk Park; Attendance: 1,164; Referee: Neil Doyle
	Penalties
	Cian Murphy (penalty missed); Matthew Britton (penalty missed); Sean McGrath (penalty scored); Sean O'Connell (penalty scored); Colin Healy (penalty scored); Ewan Lee (penalty scored); Niall Brookwell (penalty scored); Vincent Borden (penalty scored)		Paddy Barrett (penalty scored); Sam Bone (penalty scored); Sean Moore (penalty scored); James Roche (penalty missed); Evan Caffrey (penalty missed); Daniel Kelly (penalty scored); Daniel Ring (penalty scored); Sean Gannon (penalty missed)

17 July	St Mochta's	1–3	Dundalk	Dundalk, County Louth
19:45	Dean Moran 83'	Report	Shane Tracey 15'; Trevor Clarke 37'; Harry Groome 65'	Stadium: Oriel Park; Attendance: 1,148; Referee: Alan Patchell
Note: St Mochta's were drawn as the home team but the two clubs agreed to switch the venue to Dundalk's Oriel Park home venue.

17 July	St Patrick's Athletic	2–1	Wexford	Inchicore, Dublin 8
19:45	Jason McClelland 14'; Aidan Keena 90'	Report	Jake Doyle 69'	Stadium: Richmond Park; Attendance: 1,419; Referee: Lucas Keating

17 July	Treaty United	1–2	UCD	Garryowen, County Limerick
19:45	Colm Whelan (red card) 33'; Ronan Manning 38' (pen.)	Report	Hugh Smith 62'; Charles Akinrintoyo 79'	Stadium: Markets Field; Attendance: 566; Referee: Mark Houlihan

17 July	Waterford	2–1	Cobh Ramblers	Waterford, County Waterford
19:45	Evan McLaughlin 79'; Pádraig Amond 90+3'	Report	Jordan Adeyemi 2'	Stadium: RSC; Attendance: 1,316; Referee: Kevin O'Sullivan

17 July	Shamrock Rovers	4–1 (a.e.t.)	Cork City	Tallaght, Dublin 24
20:00	Naj Razi 47'; John McGovern 95' (pen.); John McGovern 110'; Max Kovalevskis 116'	Report	Ruairí Keating 54' (pen.)	Stadium: Tallaght Stadium; Attendance: 2,525; Referee: Robert Harvey
Note: Live on RTÉ2.

18 July	Bangor Celtic	4–5	College Corinthians	Crumlin, Dublin 12
14:00	Callum Redmond 25'; Jake Scott 55'; Jake Scott 56'; Adam Colgan 70'	Report	Anthony Brothers 8'; Padraig McGrath 11'; Killian Cooper 48'; Killian Cooper 52'; Killian Cooper 61'	Stadium: Blakes Astro Pearse Park; Attendance: TBC; Referee: Mark Moynihan

18 July	Douglas Hall	0–1	Castlebar Celtic	Douglas, County Cork
15:00		Report	Dylan Felle 20'	Stadium: Monegourney; Attendance: TBC; Referee: Raymond Murphy

18 July	Janesboro	0–4	Sligo Rovers	Limerick, County Limerick
16:30		Report	Archie Meekison 1'; Archie Meekison 29'; Cian Kavanagh 56'; Seb Quirk 62'	Stadium: Pearse Stadium; Attendance: 261; Referee: Daniel Murphy

18 July	Baldoyle United	0–8	Longford Town	Mullolagher, County Longford
17:00		Report	Pharrell Manuel 6'; Pharrell Manuel 12'; Stefan Ugbesia 30'; Alex O'Brien 66'; Stefan Ugnesia 80'; Stefan Ugbesia 82'; Stefan Ugbesia 84'; Cole Omorehiomwan 87'	Stadium: Bishopsgate; Attendance: 400; Referee: Marc Lynch
Note: Baldoyle United were drawn as the home team but the two clubs agreed to switch the venue to Longford Town's Bishopsgate home venue.

19 July	Derry City	3–0	Tolka Rovers	Derry, Derry City and Strabane
16:00	Adam O'Reilly 29'; Ellis Chapman 83'; Ellis Chapman 90+2'	Report		Stadium: Ryan McBride Brandywell Stadium; Referee: Aaron O'Dowd

19 July	Ringmahon Rangers	w/o	Bohemians	N/A
		Report		Stadium: N/A
Note: Bohemians advanced after Ringmahon Rangers failed to confirm the fixture's venue within the FAI's deadline and withdrew from the tie, citing logistical challenges and player availability issues.

== Third round ==
14 August	Galway United	1–1 (a.e.t.) (5–3 p)	Bray Wanderers	Galway, County Galway
19:45	David Hurley 86'	Report	Tyreik Sammy 80'	Stadium: Eamonn Deacy Park; Attendance: 1,257; Referee: Paul McLaughlin
	Penalties
	David Hurley (penalty scored); Frantz Pierrot (penalty scored); Jimmy Keohane (penalty scored); Lee Devitt (penalty scored); Dylan Connolly (penalty scored)		Tyreik Sammy (penalty scored); Richard Ferizaj (penalty missed); Benjamin Fagbemi (penalty scored); Ajibola Oluwabiyi (penalty scored)

14 August	UCD	1–2	Derry City	Belfield, Dublin 4
19:45	Louis Dignam 17'	Report	Michael Duffy 7'; Tyler Smith 64'	Stadium: UCD Bowl; Attendance: 436; Referee: Lucas Keating

14 August	Waterford	2–1	Athlone Town	Waterford, County Waterford
19:45	Pádraig Amond 16'; Benny Couto 51'	Report	Cillian Tollett 26'	Stadium: RSC; Attendance: 1,511; Referee: Alan Patchell

15 August	College Corinthians	0–3	Drogheda United	Douglas, County Cork
16:00		Report	Keegan Ancelin 1'; Mark Doyle 13'; Keegan Ancelin 40'	Stadium: Corinthians Park; Attendance: 307; Referee: Kevin O'Sullivan

15 August	Dundalk	8–0	Castlebar Celtic	Dundalk, County Louth
17:00	Cian Dillon 9' (pen.); Bobby Burns 8'; Luke Mulligan 42'; Leo Gaxha 59'; Luke Mulligan 61'; Cian Dillon 67'; Aaron Keogh 71'; Danny Mullen 80'	Report		Stadium: Oriel Park; Attendance: 1,317; Referee: Oliver Moran

15 August	Sligo Rovers	4–0	Kerry	Sligo, County Sligo
19:45	Cian Kavanagh 14'; Alex Nolan 34' (pen.); Carl McHugh 80'; Kaiyne Woolery 90+1'	Report		Stadium: The Showgrounds; Attendance: 1,879; Referee: Rob Harvey

16 August	St Patrick's Athletic	3–2 (a.e.t.)	Shamrock Rovers	Inchicore, Dublin 8
14:00	Luke Turner 54'; Aidan Keena 90+4' (pen.); Sam Rooney 93'	Report	Jonathan Afolabi 39'; Michael Noonan 44'	Stadium: Richmond Park; Attendance: 4,660; Referee: Neil Doyle
Note: Live on RTÉ2.

16 August	Bohemians	4–0	Longford Town	Phibsborough, Dublin 7
19:00	Harry Vaughan 6'; Colm Whelan 18'; Colm Whelan 56'; Connor Parsons 90+1'	Report		Stadium: Dalymount Park; Attendance: 3,339; Referee: Daniel Murphy

== Quarter Final ==
4 September	Drogheda United	1–2	Galway United	Drogheda, County Louth
19:45	Brandon Kavanagh 15'; Mark Doyle (yellow card) 64' (yellow-red card)	Report	Stephen Walsh 23'; Lee Devitt 82'	Stadium: Sullivan & Lambe Park; Referee: Kevin O'Sullivan

4 September	Waterford	3–0	Sligo Rovers	Waterford, County Waterford
19:45	Pádraig Amond 8'; Tommy Lonergan 50'; Oliver Denham 59' (o.g.)	Report		Stadium: RSC; Attendance: 2,566; Referee: Rob Hennessey

5 September	St Patrick's Athletic	1–1 (7–8 p)	Bohemians	Inchicore, Dublin 8
16:00	Anthony Breslin 100'	Report	Ryan Edmondson 111' (o.g.)	Stadium: Richmond Park; Attendance: 4,888; Referee: Paul Norton
	Penalties
	Barry Baggley (penalty scored); Joe Redmond (penalty scored); Seán Hoare (penalty missed); Ryan Sheridan (penalty scored); Ryan Edmondson (penalty scored); Darragh Nugent (penalty scored); Luke Turner (penalty scored); Romal Palmer (penalty missed)		Colm Whelan (penalty missed); Cian Byrne (penalty scored); Paddy Madden (penalty scored); Dawson Devoy (penalty scored); Ross Tierney (penalty scored); Senan Mullen (penalty scored); Adam McDonnell (penalty scored); Sadou Diallo (penalty scored); Patrick Hickey (penalty scored)
Note: Live on RTÉ2.

6 September	Derry City	4–2	Dundalk	Derry, Derry City and Strabane
16:00	Patrick McClean 23'; Michael Duffy 44' (pen.); Harry Groome 80' (o.g.); Michael Duffy 85'	Report	Shane Tracey 12'; Leo Gaxha 90'	Stadium: Ryan McBride Brandywell Stadium; Attendance: 3,025; Referee: Paul McLaughlin
Note: Live on RTÉ2.

== Semi Final ==
9 October	Bohemians	0–2	Waterford	Phibsborough, Dublin 7
19:45		Report	Noah Mawene 51'; Tommy Lonergan 58'	Stadium: Dalymount Park; Referee: Rob Harvey

10 October	Galway United	0–2	Derry City	Galway, County Galway
15:00		Report	Michael Duffy 27', 45+1'	Stadium: Eamonn Deacy Park; Referee: Paul Norton

== Final ==
8 November 2026
15:00

Derry City	1–0	Waterford
Burns 69'	Report

Aviva Stadium, Ballsbridge, Dublin 4
Attendance: 36,093
Referee: Kevin O'Sullivan

== See also ==
- 2026 League of Ireland Premier Division
- 2026 League of Ireland First Division
