= 2026 Bohemian F.C. season =

Irish football club season

Bohemian F.C.
2026 season
- Manager: Alan Reynolds
- Stadium: Dalymount Park, Phibsborough, Dublin 7
- Premier Division: 2nd
- FAI Cup: Semi final
- Leinster Senior Cup: Group stage
- UEFA Conference League: Third qualifying round
- Top goalscorer: League: Colm Whelan (13 goals); All: Colm Whelan (15 goals)
- Highest home attendance: 21,472 vs St Patrick's Athletic, 8 February
- Lowest home attendance: 3,339 vs Longford Town, 16 August
- Biggest win: 0–4 vs Sligo Rovers, 15 February; 4–0 vs Longford Town, 16 August
- Biggest defeat: 4–1 vs Derry City, 12 June
Home colours	Away colours	Third colours

The 2026 League of Ireland Premier Division season was Bohemian Football Club's 136th year in their history and their 42nd consecutive season in the League of Ireland Premier Division since it became the top tier of Irish football. Bohemians participated in the FAI Cup and competed in the Leinster Senior Cup pre-season. This year marked Bohs' return to European football as they participated in the 2026–27 UEFA Conference League qualifiers, progressing to the third round. The Gypsies finished their campaign as league runners-up.

== Club ==
=== Kits ===
==== Home ====
Supplier: O'Neills | Sponsor: Des Kelly Interiors

Bohemian FC's 2026 home shirt was released in memory of Billy Young and inspired by the shirt worn 50 years previously by their cup winning team, the first kit in either Ireland or Britain with a sponsor. The retro jersey is sponsored by main club partners Des Kelly Interiors and kit supplier O’Neill's who both agreed to use of their logos from the era. The shirt is directly inspired by the club's 1976 jersey, featuring a full red body, stitched black stripes, O’Neill's and Des Kelly logos from the era alongside the Bohs crest from the time. There is a neck collar tape with Dalymount in Irish and English repeating. The embroidered hem tag features Billy Young's name and signature.

==== Away ====
Supplier: O'Neills | Sponsor: Kneecap

Bohemian FC has partnered with Kneecap to release their 2026 away jersey. The collaboration was designed by the members of acclaimed Irish hip-hop trio Kneecap in conjunction with Bohemian FC designers, pays homage to the unbreakable bond between the Irish and Palestinian people. The white shirt body is patterned with a Kufiyah design that is decorated with interwoven Irish and Palestine flags. The crest is in the Irish language. The letters C.E.A.R.T.A (“rights”) from the track of the same name adorn the inside neck tape. The collar and cuff are woven with orange, green and red – the standout colours from the Irish and Palestinian flags. On each sleeve are three stitched stripes of the same colours, an embroidered hem tag features a Palestinian and Irish graffiti style flag with the words ‘Dluthpháirtíocht / Solidarity’. 30% of profits from the shirt will be sent to ACLAÍ Palestine to go straight into a fund to enable the construction/fit-out of a community music studio to enable artists and musicians in the Aida Camp (West Bank) to be able to enjoy music at any level. It will also enable these artists to record and produce music that can be the catalyst for future careers.

==== Cup/Third ====
Supplier: O'Neills | Sponsor: Massive Attack

Bohemian Football Club, in partnership with Massive Attack, announced the release of the club's 2026 FAI Cup jersey that raises funds for medical aid to Cuba. Thirty per cent of profits will be shared between the Cuba Solidarity Campaign’s Cuba Vive Medical Aid Appeal and mediCuba-Europe. The jersey, designed by the legendary Bristol artists in conjunction with Bohemian FC designers, pays homage to Cuban kits of the past and to the connection between Cuba and Ireland.

==== Alternate ====
Supplier: O'Neills | Sponsor: Kneecap

Bohs commissioned an alternate strip for their away fixtures with Derry City and St Patrick's Athletic, as both the home kit and away kit clashed with the red and white shirts of those teams. This kit features the Kneecap balaclava logo on a black jersey with thin red horizontal stripes. It was announced by COPA90 that the strip would be available for purchase in May, with a percentage of proceeds going to a charity connected to the club.

=== Management team ===
Position	Name
Manager	(Republic of Ireland) Alan Reynolds
Assistant manager	(Republic of Ireland) Stephen O'Donnell
Technical assistant	(Republic of Ireland) Derek Pender
Goalkeeping coach	(Republic of Ireland) Sean Fogarty
Strength & conditioning	(Republic of Ireland) Ciaran O'Reilly
Chartered physiotherapist	(England) Danny Miller
Club doctor	(Republic of Ireland) Fiona Dennehy
Director of football	(Republic of Ireland) Pat Fenlon

== Transfers ==
=== Transfers in ===
Date	Pos.	Player	From	Fee	Source
January 2026	DF	(Republic of Ireland) Sam Todd	(Republic of Ireland) Derry City	Free	
January 2026	DF	(United States) Patrick Hickey	(Republic of Ireland) Galway United	Free	
January 2026	MF	(Republic of Ireland) James McManus	(Republic of Ireland) Sligo Rovers	Loan return	
January 2026	ST	(Republic of Ireland) Hugh Martin	(Republic of Ireland) UCD	Free	
January 2026	MF	(Republic of Ireland) Harry Vaughan	(England) Hull City	Free	
January 2026	DF	(Republic of Ireland) Ryan Burke	(Republic of Ireland) Waterford	Free	
January 2026	GK	(United States) Paul Walters	(United States) FC Cincinnati	Loan	
January 2026	MF	(England) Sadou Diallo	(Republic of Ireland) Derry City	Free	
January 2026	DF	(Republic of Ireland) Senan Mullen	(Italy) Torino	Loan	
January 2026	DF	(Republic of Ireland) Darragh Power	(England) Cheltenham Town	Free	
February 2026	MF	(England) Zane Myers	(England) Hull City	Free	
July 2026	MF	(Republic of Ireland) Rhys Brennan	(Republic of Ireland) Cobh Ramblers	Loan return	
August 2026	MF	(Scotland) Josh Adam	(Czech Republic) Dynamo České Budějovice	Free	
August 2026	ST	(Republic of Ireland) Paddy Madden	(England) Chesterfield	Free	

=== Transfers out ===
Date	Pos.	Player	To	Fee	Source
January 2026	MF	(Scotland) Archie Meekison	(Republic of Ireland) Sligo Rovers	Free	
January 2026	DF	(Republic of Ireland) John Mountney	(Republic of Ireland) Glenavon	Free	
January 2026	MF	(Republic of Ireland) Keith Buckley	(Republic of Ireland) Dundalk	Free	
January 2026	GK	(Republic of Ireland) James Talbot	(United States) Corpus Christi FC	Free	
January 2026	DF	(Republic of Ireland) Rob Cornwall	(Republic of Ireland) Dundalk	Free	
January 2026	DF	(England) Alex Lacey	Unattached	End of contract	
January 2026	MF	(Republic of Ireland) James Clarke	(Republic of Ireland) Derry City	Free	
January 2026	MF	(Republic of Ireland) Billy Gilmore	(Republic of Ireland) St. Mochta's	Free	
January 2026	DF	(Republic of Ireland) Declan Osagie	(Republic of Ireland) Bray Wanderers	Loan	
February 2026	MF	(Republic of Ireland) Rhys Brennan	(Republic of Ireland) Cobh Ramblers	Loan	
February 2026	MF	(Republic of Ireland) James McManus	(Republic of Ireland) Sligo Rovers	Loan	
June 2026	DF	(Malawi) Jubril Okedina	(England) Barnsley	Mutual consent	
July 2026	DF	(Republic of Ireland) Leigh Kavanagh	(Republic of Ireland) Galway United	Loan	
August 2026	MF	(Republic of Ireland) Rhys Brennan	(Northern Ireland) Linfield	Loan	
September 2026	ST	(Republic of Ireland) Josh Harpur	(Italy) Como 1907	Undisclosed fee	

== First Team Squad ==
No.	Player	Nat.	Pos.	Date of birth (age)	Since	Ends	Last club
Goalkeepers
1	Kacper Chorążka	(Poland)	GK	18 April 1999 (age 27)	2024	2026	(Cyprus) ASIL Lysi
25	Paul Walters	(United States)	GK	11 April 2004 (age 22)	2026	2026	(United States) FC Cincinnati
30	Finn McDonnell	(Northern Ireland)	GK	10 January 2010 (age 16)	2026	2026	(Republic of Ireland) Bohemians U20
Defenders
3	Ryan Burke	(Republic of Ireland)	LB	23 November 2000 (age 25)	2026	2026	(Republic of Ireland) Waterford
4	Niall Morahan	(Republic of Ireland)	RB/CM	30 May 2000 (age 26)	2025	2026	(Republic of Ireland) Sligo Rovers
6	Jordan Flores	(England)	LB/CM	4 October 1995 (age 31)	2022	2027	(England) Northampton Town
12	Patrick Hickey	(United States)	CB	2 July 1998 (age 28)	2026	2027	(Republic of Ireland) Galway United
15	Senan Mullen	(Republic of Ireland)	CB	28 February 2005 (age 21)	2026	2026	(Italy) Torino
16	Darragh Power	(Republic of Ireland)	RB	29 December 2000 (age 25)	2026	2027	(England) Cheltenham Town
20	Leigh Kavanagh	(Republic of Ireland)	CB	27 December 2003 (age 22)	2024	2027	(England) Brighton & Hove Albion
22	Sam Todd	(Republic of Ireland)	CB	28 April 1998 (age 28)	2026	2027	(Republic of Ireland) Derry City
24	Cian Byrne	(Republic of Ireland)	CB	31 January 2003 (age 23)	2022	2027	(Republic of Ireland) Bohemians U20
Midfielders
5	Sadou Diallo	(England)	CM	10 June 1999 (age 27)	2026	2027	(Republic of Ireland) Derry City
7	Connor Parsons	(England)	LM	26 October 2000 (age 26)	2025	2026	(England) Dagenham & Redbridge
8	Harry Vaughan	(Republic of Ireland)	AM	6 April 2004 (age 22)	2026	2026	(England) Hull City
10	Dawson Devoy (C)	(Republic of Ireland)	CM	20 November 2001 (age 24)	2024	2027	(England) MK Dons
11	Dayle Rooney	(Republic of Ireland)	LM/RM	24 February 1998 (age 28)	2024	2027	(Republic of Ireland) Drogheda United
17	Adam McDonnell	(Republic of Ireland)	CM	14 May 1997 (age 29)	2023	2027	(Republic of Ireland) Sligo Rovers
21	Josh Adam	(Scotland)	AM	3 February 2004 (age 22)	2026	2026	(Czech Republic) Dynamo České Budějovice
23	Zane Myers	(England)	LM	11 August 2005 (age 21)	2026	2026	(England) Hull City
26	Ross Tierney	(Republic of Ireland)	AM	6 March 2001 (age 25)	2024	2026	(Scotland) Motherwell
27	Curtis Egan	(Republic of Ireland)	CM	4 January 2009 (age 17)	2026	2026	(Republic of Ireland) Bohemians U20
32	Markuss Strods	(Latvia)	AM/RM	5 October 2006 (age 20)	2024	2027	(Republic of Ireland) Bohemians U20
33	Christopher Conlon	(Republic of Ireland)	AM	21 April 2007 (age 19)	2024	2026	(Republic of Ireland) Bohemians U20
Forwards
9	Colm Whelan	(Republic of Ireland)	ST	29 June 2000 (age 26)	2025	2026	(Republic of Ireland) Derry City
18	Douglas James-Taylor	(England)	ST	18 November 2001 (age 25)	2025	2027	(England) Walsall F.C.
28	Hugh Martin	(Republic of Ireland)	ST	5 August 2009 (age 17)	2026	2027	(Republic of Ireland) UCD
41	Paddy Madden	(Republic of Ireland)	ST	4 March 1990 (age 36)	2026	2026	(England) Chesterfield

== Friendlies ==
=== Pre-season ===
Win Draw Loss

9 January	Bohemians	1-1	Drogheda United	Coolock
12:00	Parsons 28'	Report	Cardo 72'	Stadium: Oscar Traynor Centre; Attendance: Behind closed doors Referee: Mark Houlihan

16 January	Bohemians	4-1	Athlone Town	Coolock
19:00	Devoy 22'; Trialist 52'; Martin 67' 75'	Report	Adewale 19'	Stadium: Oscar Traynor Centre; Attendance: Behind closed doors Referee: Glen Geraghty

16 January	Bohemians	2-1	Longford Town	Abbotstown
19:00	Tierney 75' 85'	Report	Trialist 60'	Stadium: National Sports Campus; Attendance: Behind closed doors Referee: Alan Patchell

24 January	Bohemians	2-2	Shelbourne	Coolock
11:00	Martin 29'; McManus 88'	Report	Trialist 10'; Odubeku 56'	Stadium: Oscar Traynor Centre; Attendance: Behind closed doors Referee: Alan Patchell

24 January	Bohemians	2-0	Shelbourne	Coolock
15:00	Whelan 2'; Strods 72'	Report		Stadium: Oscar Traynor Centre; Attendance: Behind closed doors Referee: Paul Norton

30 January	Bohemians	4-1	Waterford	Coolock
13:00	Tierney 10'; Todd 17'; Vaughan 80'; Harpur 90'	Report		Stadium: Oscar Traynor Centre; Attendance: Behind closed doors Referee: Paul Tuite

=== Mid-season ===
24 July	Bohemians (Republic of Ireland)	2-2	(England) Chesterfield	Phibsborough
18:00	Myers 5'; Byrne 16'	Report	Markanday 42'; Bonis 62'	Stadium: Dalymount Park; Attendance: 707

26 September	Bohemians (Republic of Ireland)	0-0	(Czech Republic) Bohemians 1905	Phibsborough
15:00				Stadium: Dalymount Park; Attendance: 2,900

== Competitions ==
=== League of Ireland ===
==== League table ====
Pos	Team	Pld	W	D	L	GF	GA	GD	Pts	Qualification or relegation
1	Shamrock Rovers (C)	36	20	8	8	59	38	+21	68	Qualification for Champions League first qualifying round
2	Bohemians	36	19	8	9	63	44	+19	65	Qualification for Conference League second qualifying round
3	St Patrick's Athletic	36	17	9	10	55	31	+24	60	Qualification for Conference League first qualifying round
4	Shelbourne	36	12	13	11	52	50	+2	49	
5	Derry City	36	11	15	10	50	47	+3	48	Qualification for Europa League first qualifying round (Note: Derry City won the 2026 FAI Cup.)
6	Dundalk	36	11	12	13	55	59	−4	45	
7	Waterford	36	10	13	13	54	61	−7	43	
8	Galway United	36	10	12	14	46	53	−7	42	
9	Drogheda United (R)	36	10	10	16	44	57	−13	40	Qualification for promotion/relegation play-off
10	Sligo Rovers (R)	36	5	10	21	28	66	−38	25	Relegation to League of Ireland First Division

Source: League of Ireland
Rules for classification: 1) Points; 2) Goal difference; 3) Goals scored.
(C) Champions; (R) Relegated

==== League Matches ====
Win Draw Loss

8 February 1	Bohemians	0–0	St Patrick's Athletic	Dublin
14:00		Report		Stadium: Aviva Stadium; Attendance: 21,472; Referee: Kevin O'Sullivan
Note: Hosted in Aviva Stadium. Broadcast live on Virgin Media Two

14 February 2	Sligo Rovers	0–4	Bohemians	Sligo
19:45		Report	Rooney 2'; Whelan 54' 64' 67' (pen.)	Stadium: The Showgrounds; Attendance: 2,754; Referee: Alan Patchell

20 February 3	Derry City	0–1	Bohemians	Derry
19:45		Report	Devoy 65'	Stadium: Ryan McBride Brandywell Stadium; Attendance: 4,434; Referee: Marc Lynch

27 February 4	Bohemians	3–2	Shamrock Rovers	Phibsborough
20:00	Parsons 26'; Whelan 56' (pen.); Tierney 87'	Report	Lopes 90+4'; Greene 90+5'	Stadium: Dalymount Park; Attendance: 4,442; Referee: Neil Doyle
Note: Broadcast live on Virgin Media Two

6 March 5	Waterford	0–1	Bohemians	Waterford
19:45		Report	Todd 18'	Stadium: Waterford RSC; Attendance: 2,683; Referee: Rob Harvey

13 March 6	Bohemians	1–0	Galway United	Phibsborough
19:45	Hickey 87'	Report		Stadium: Dalymount Park; Attendance: 4,096; Referee: Daniel Murphy

16 March 7	Shelbourne	0–0	Bohemians	Drumcondra
19:45		Report		Stadium: Tolka Park; Attendance: 5,650; Referee: Aaron O'Dowd

20 March 8	Bohemians	1–1	Dundalk	Phibsborough
20:00	Hickey 20'	Report	Arubi 59'	Stadium: Dalymount Park; Attendance: 4,383; Referee: Rob Hennessy
Note: Broadcast live on Virgin Media Two

3 April 9	Drogheda United	0–0	Bohemians	Drogheda
19:45		Report		Stadium: Sullivan and Lambe Park; Attendance: 2,554; Referee: Paul Norton

6 April 10	Bohemians	1–1	Waterford	Phibsborough
17:00	Whelan 72' (pen.)	Report	Mahon 35'	Stadium: Dalymount Park; Attendance: 4,193; Referee: Declan Toland

10 April 11	Bohemians	1-2	Sligo Rovers	Phibsborough
19:45	Myers 8'; McDonnell (red card) 72'	Report	Fitzgerald 39'; McHale 49'	Stadium: Dalymount Park; Attendance: 4,018; Referee: Neil Doyle

17 April 12	Shamrock Rovers	2-1	Bohemians	Tallaght
20:00	Burke 6' 44' (pen.)	Report	Whelan 80' (pen.)	Stadium: Tallaght Stadium; Attendance: 9,202; Referee: Rob Hennessy
Note: Broadcast live on Virgin Media Two

24 April 13	St Patrick's Athletic	3-1	Bohemians	Inchicore
19:45	Edmunson 10' 53'; Lennon 42'	Report	Strods 1'	Stadium: Richmond Park; Attendance: 5.435; Referee: Kevin O'Sullivan

1 May 14	Bohemians	1-1	Derry City	Phibsborough
20:00	Strods 53'	Report	Olayinka 39'; O'Reilly (red card) 82'	Stadium: Dalymount Park; Attendance: 4,101; Referee: Rob Harvey
Note: Broadcast live on Virgin Media Two

4 May 15	Bohemians	2-2	Shelbourne	Phibsborough
17:00	McDonnell 10'; Vaughan 89'	Report	Martin 16'; Wood 72'	Stadium: Dalymount Park; Attendance: 4,015; Referee: Neil Doyle

8 May 16	Dundalk	1-3	Bohemians	Dundalk
19:45	Dervin 35'; Cornwall (red card) 69'		Tierney 50'; James-Taylor 69' (pen.); Myers 90+3'	Stadium: Oriel Park; Attendance: 3,127; Referee: Aaron O’Dowd

15 May 17	Bohemians	2-1	Drogheda United	Phibsborough
19:45	Rooney 56'; Hickey 68'	Report	Oluwa 86'	Stadium: Dalymount Park; Attendance: 4.379; Referee: Marc Lynch

22 May 18	Galway United	2–4	Bohemians	Galway
19:45	McCarthy 61', 76'	Report	Devoy 26'; James-Taylor 30'; Tierney 74'; Hickey 78'	Stadium: Eamonn Deacy Park; Attendance: 2,442; Referee: Lucas Keating

25 May 19	Bohemians	1-2	Shamrock Rovers	Phibsborough
20:00	Tierney 21'	Report	McGovern 72'; Stevens 90+7'	Stadium: Dalymount Park; Attendance: 4,442; Referee: Kevin O'Sullivan
Note: Broadcast live on Virgin Media Two

29 May 20	Sligo Rovers	1-3	Bohemians	Sligo
19:45	O'Kane 54'	Report	James-Taylor 27'; Whelan 49'; Parsons 83'	Stadium: The Showgrounds; Attendance: 2,754

12 June 21	Derry City	4-1	Bohemians	Derry
19:45	Clarke 24' 61'; Barr 61'; Dos Santos 63'	Report	Vaughan 17'	Stadium: Celtic Park; Attendance: 3,050; Referee: Rob Hennessy
Note: Game played at Celtic Park during Brandywell redevelopment

19 June 22	Bohemians	1–2	Dundalk	Phibsborough
20:00	Byrne 5'	Report	Mullen 22'; Kenny 77'; McDaid (red card) 87'	Stadium: Dalymount Park; Attendance: 4,017; Referee: Paul McLaughlin
Note: Broadcast live on Virgin Media Three

22 June 23	Shelbourne	0-3	Bohemians	Drumcondra
19:45	Boyd (red card) 82'	Report	Vaughan 1'; Whelan 30'; Tierney 82'	Stadium: Tolka Park; Attendance: 5,329; Referee: Kevin O' Sullivan

26 June 24	Bohemians	2–0	St Patrick's Athletic	Phibsborough
19:45	Whelan 39' (pen.); Tierney 89'; Hickey (red card) 45'	Report		Stadium: Dalymount Park; Attendance: 4,223; Referee: Rob Harvey
Note: Broadcast live on Virgin Media Three

3 July 25	Drogheda United	0-2	Bohemians	Drogheda
19:45		Report	Doyle 16' (o.g.); James-Taylor 78'	Stadium: Sullivan & Lambe Park; Attendance: 2,283; Referee: Paul Norton

2 August 26	Bohemians	1-1	Galway United	Phibsborough
19:00	Whelan 23' (pen.)	Report	Bolger 37'	Stadium: Dalymount Park; Attendance: 4,019; Referee: Rob Hennessy
Note: Fixture moved to Sunday date due to involvement in Europa Conference League

9 August 27	Waterford	3-1	Bohemians	Waterford
15:00	Lonergan 21'; Amond 38' 44'	Report	Rooney 71'	Stadium: Waterford Regional Sports Centre; Attendance: 2,776; Referee: Kevin O'Sullivan
Note: Fixture moved to Sunday date due to involvement in Europa Conference League

21 August 28	Bohemians	5-3	Derry City	Phibsborough
19:45	Hickey 47'; Parsons 50'; James-Taylor 53'; Tierney 79' 87'	Report	Duffy 34' 94' (pen.); Smith 62'; Clarke (red card) 55'	Stadium: Dalymount Park; Attendance: 4,042; Referee: Rob Harvey

28 August 29	Bohemians	3-0	Sligo Rovers	Phibsborough
19:45	Devoy 8'; James-Taylor; 28'; Flores 42'	Report		Stadium: Dalymount Park; Attendance: 4,236; Referee: Kevin O'Sullivan

11 September 30	Galway United	2-3	Bohemians	Galway
19:45	Walsh 31'; Twardek 53'	Report	Whelan 74' 89'; Tierney 81'	Stadium: Eamon Deacy Park; Attendance: 2,419; Referee: Paul McLaughlin

18 September 31	Bohemians	2-1	Drogheda United	Phibsborough
19:45	Parsons 42'; Devoy 90'	Report	Quinn 73'	Stadium: Dalymount Park; Attendance: 4,401; Referee: Rob Hennessy
Note: Broadcast live on Virgin Media Two

2 October 32	Dundalk	1-2	Bohemians	Dundalk
19:425	Whelan 26' (pen.); Tierney 67'	Report	Horgan 87' (pen.)	Stadium: Oriel Park; Attendance: 3,154; Referee: Damien MacGraith
Note: Match rescheduled due to Bohemians participating in FAI Cup

12 October 33	Shamrock Rovers	2–1	Bohemians	Tallaght
20:00	McGovern 34'; Watts 76'; Razi (red card) FT; Noonan (red card) FT	Report	Tierney 71'; Devoy (red card) FT	Stadium: Tallaght Stadium; Attendance: 10,208; Referee: Rob Hennessy
Note: Fixture rearranged due to involvement in FAI Cup.

16 October 34	Bohemians	2-1	Waterford	Phibsborough
19:45	Todd 12'; Burke 64'	Report	Amond 38'	Stadium: Dalymount Park; Attendance: 4,011; Referee: Paul McLaughlin

23 October 35	Bohemians	0-1	Shelbourne	Phibsborough
19:45		Report	Odubeko 85'	Stadium: Dalymount Park; Attendance: 4,445; Referee: Rob Harvey

30 October 36	St Patrick's Athletic	2-3	Bohemians	Inchicore
19:45	McHale 9'; Leavy 61'	Report	Flores 36'; Byrne 45+1'; Parsons 57'	Stadium: Richmond Park; Attendance: 4,885; Referee: Rob Hennessy

==== Results by match day ====
Round	1	2	3	4	5	6	7	8	9	10	11	12	13	14	15	16	17	18	19	20	21	22	23	24	25	26	27	28	29	30	31	32	33	34	35	36
Ground	H	A	A	H	A	H	A	H	A	H	H	A	A	H	H	A	H	A	H	A	A	H	A	H	A	H	A	H	H	A	H	A	A	H	H	A
Result	D	W	W	W	W	W	D	D	D	D	L	L	L	D	D	W	W	W	L	W	L	L	W	W	W	D	L	W	W	W	W	W	L	W	L	W
Position	5	2	1	1	1	1	1	1	2	2	3	4	4	3	3	3	3	3	3	2	3	4	3	2	2	3	3	3	3	3	3	2	3	2	2	2

Updated to match(es) played on 30 October 2026. Source: 2026 League of Ireland Premier Division
A = Away; H = Home; W = Win; D = Draw; L = Loss

=== FAI Cup ===
19 July Second Round	Ringmahon Rangers	w/o	Bohemians	N/A
		Report
Note: Bohemians advance after Ringmahon Rangers withdrew due to not confirming the fixture within the FAI's deadline.

16 August Third Round	Bohemians	4-0	Longford Town	Phibsborough
19:00	Vaughan 6'; Whelan 18' 56'; Parsons 90+1'	Report		Stadium: Dalymount Park; Attendance: 3,339; Referee: Daniel Murphy

5 September Quarter Final	St Patrick's Athletic	1-1 (a.e.t.) (7–8 p)	Bohemians	Inchicore
16:00	Breslin 100'	Report	Edmondson 111' (o.g.)	Stadium: Richmond Park; Attendance: 4,888; Referee: Paul Norton
	Penalties
	Baggley (penalty scored); Redmond (penalty scored); Hoare (penalty missed); Sheridan (penalty scored); Edmonson (penalty scored); Nugent (penalty scored); Turner (penalty scored); Palmer (penalty missed)		Whelan (penalty missed); Byrne (penalty scored); Madden (penalty scored); Devoy (penalty scored); Tierney (penalty scored); Mullen (penalty scored); McDonnell (penalty scored); Diallo (penalty scored); Hickey (penalty scored)
Note: Broadcast live on RTÉ2.

9 October Semi final	Bohemians	0-2	Waterford	Phibsborough
19:45		Report	Mawene 51'; Lonergan 58'	Stadium: Dalymount Park; Attendance: 4400 (est); Referee: Rob Harvey
Note: Broadcast live on RTE2

=== Group D ===
Team	Pld	W	D	L	GF	GA	GD	Pts
Finglas United	3	2	1	0	3	0	3	7
Bray Wanderers	3	2	1	0	5	2	3	7
Bohemians	3	0	1	2	1	4	–3	1
Wexford	3	0	1	2	1	4	–3	1

Win Draw Loss

18 January Group Stage	Finglas United	1-0	Bohemians	Finglas
12:00	McLaren 90+2'			Stadium: Larney Park; Attendance: 400 (est.); Referee: Robert Dowling

31 January Group Stage	Bohemians	0-0	Wexford	Coolock
13:00				Stadium: Oscar Traynor Centre; Attendance: Behind closed doors Referee: Declan Troy

6 February Group Stage	Bray Wanderers	3-1	Bohemians	Bray
19:45	Doyle 26'; Sammy 68'; Osagie 71'		Conlon 50'	Stadium: Carlisle Grounds; Attendance: TBC; Referee: Daryl Carolan

=== UEFA Conference League ===
9 July First qualifying round	Bohemians (Republic of Ireland)	2-0	(Gibraltar) St Joseph's	Phibsborough
18:00	James-Taylor 60' (pen.); Parsons 90+1'	Report		Stadium: Dalymount Park; Attendance: 3,683; Referee: Lasse Læbel Graagaard (Denmark)

16 July First qualifying round	St Joseph's (Gibraltar)	0-0	(Republic of Ireland) Bohemians	Gibraltar
18:00 (17:00 Irish time)	Francis Ferrón (red card) 65'	Report		Stadium: Europa Point Stadium; Attendance: 1,044; Referee: Kristaps Ratnieks (Latvia)

22 July Second qualifying round	Bohemians (Republic of Ireland)	2-1	(Kosovo) Ballkani	Phibsborough
18:00	James-Taylor 76'; Tierney 89'	Report	Domgjoni 29' (pen.)	Stadium: Dalymount Park; Attendance: 3,684; Referee: Jakob Semier (Austria)

30 July Second qualifying round	Ballkani (Kosovo)	3-2 (a.e.t.) (4–5 p)	Bohemians (Republic of Ireland)	Pristina, Kosovo
20:00 (18:00 Irish time)	Serebe 10'; Giovanni 50'; Domgjoni 58'		James-Taylor 20' (pen.); Hickey 88'	Stadium: Fadil Vokrri Stadium; Attendance: 867; Referee: Volen Chinkov (Bulgaria)
	Penalties
	Jashanica (penalty missed); Ismailgeci (penalty scored); Berisha (penalty scored); Diéne (penalty scored); Dosso (penalty scored)		(penalty scored) Whelan; (penalty scored) Devoy; (penalty scored) Byrne; (penalty scored) Rooney; (penalty scored) Flores

6 August Third qualifying round	Bohemians (Republic of Ireland)	0-2	(Denmark) Midtjylland	Tallaght
19:45		Report	Franculino 28'; Byskov 77'	Stadium: Tallaght Stadium; Attendance: 6,058; Referee: Rares George Vidican (Romania)

13 August Third qualifying round	Midtjylland (Denmark)	3-2	(Republic of Ireland) Bohemians	Herning, Denmark
19:00 (18:00 Irish time)	Franculino 26' (pen.); Johannesen 47'; Iheanacho 78'	Report	Myers 62'; Rooney 88'	Stadium: MCH Arena; Attendance: 8,621; Referee: Matteo Marcenaro (Italy)

=== Overview ===
Competition	Record							
Competition	P	W	D	L	GF	GA	GD	Win %
Premier Division	36	19	8	9	63	44	+19	52.78
FAI Cup	3	2	0	1	5	3	+2	66.67
Leinster Senior Cup	3	0	1	2	1	4	−3	0.00
Conference League	6	2	1	3	8	9	−1	33.33
Total	48	23	10	15	77	58	+19	47.92

Source: Competitions

== Statistics ==
=== Appearances and goals ===
Brackets denotes appearances made as a substitute.

No.	Pos.	Player	League		FAI Cup		LSC		Conf Lge		Total	
No.	Pos.	Player	Apps	Goals	Apps	Goals	Apps	Goals	Apps	Goals	Apps	Goals
1	GK	(Poland) Kacper Chorążka	20	0	1	0	1	0	0	0	22	0
2	DF	(Malawi) Jubril Okedina	0	0	0	0	0	0	0	0	0	0
3	DF	(Republic of Ireland) Ryan Burke	6(4)	1	0	0	2	0	0	0	8(4)	1
4	DF/MF	(Republic of Ireland) Niall Morahan	23(15)	0	2(1)	0	0	0	2(1)	0	27(17)	0
5	MF	(England) Sadou Diallo	20(11)	1	1(1)	0	1	0	4(3)	0	27(15)	0
6	DF/MF	(Republic of Ireland) Jordan Flores	32(6)	2	2	0	0	0	6	0	40(6)	2
7	MF	(England) Connor Parsons	32(15)	5	3(1)	1	0	0	4(2)	1	39(18)	7
8	MF	(Republic of Ireland) Harry Vaughan	30(9)	3	3(1)	1	0	0	6(4)	0	39(14)	4
9	FW	(Republic of Ireland) Colm Whelan	36(13)	13	3(2)	2	1	0	5(4)	0	45(18)	15
10	MF	(Republic of Ireland) Dawson Devoy	31	4	3	0	0	0	6	0	40	4
11	MF	(Republic of Ireland) Dayle Rooney	25(6)	3	2(1)	0	1	0	6(5)	1	34(12)	4
12	DF	(United States) Patrick Hickey	35(2)	5	3	0	0	0	6	1	44(2)	6
14	MF	(Republic of Ireland) James McManus	1	0	0	0	0	0	0	0	1	0
15	DF	(Republic of Ireland) Senan Mullen	24(4)	0	3	0	0	0	5	0	32(4)	0
16	DF	(Republic of Ireland) Darragh Power	35(3)	0	2	0	1	0	5	0	43(3)	0
17	MF	(Republic of Ireland) Adam McDonnell	25(16)	1	2(2)	0	1	0	4(1)	0	32(19)	1
18	FW	(England) Douglas James-Taylor	24(9)	6	2	0	0	0	6(2)	3	32(10)	9
19	MF	(Republic of Ireland) Rhys Brennan	0	0	0	0	2	0	0	0	2	0
20	DF	(Republic of Ireland) Leigh Kavanagh	5(5)	0	0	0	1	0	0	0	6(5)	0
21	MF	(Scotland) Josh Adam	0	0	1(1)	0	0	0	0	0	1(1)	0
22	DF	(Republic of Ireland) Sam Todd	29(1)	2	0	0	0	0	5	0	34(1)	2
23	MF	(England) Zane Myers	21(15)	2	2	0	0	0	1(1)	1	24(16)	3
24	DF	(Republic of Ireland) Cian Byrne	25(7)	2	3(1)	0	1	0	5(3)	0	34(11)	2
25	GK	(United States) Paul Walters	16	0	2	0	0	0	6	0	24	0
26	MF	(Republic of Ireland) Ross Tierney	35(3)	11	3	0	0	0	6	1	43(3)	12
27	MF	(Republic of Ireland) Curtis Egan	0	0	0	0	3(2)	0	0	0	3(2)	0
28	FW	(Republic of Ireland) Hugh Martin	6(6)	0	0	0	0	0	0	0	6(6)	0
29	FW	(Republic of Ireland) Josh Harpur	2(2)	0	0	0	2(1)	0	0	0	4(3)	0
30	GK	(Northern Ireland) Finn Mc Donnell	0	0	0	0	2	0	0	0	2	0
32	MF	(Latvia) Markuss Strods	23(14)	2	1(1)	0	1	0	5(3)	0	30(18)	2
33	MF	(Republic of Ireland) Christopher Conlan	0	0	0	0	3(1)	1	0	0	3(1)	1
41	FW	(Republic of Ireland) Paddy Madden	2(2)	0	3(3)	0	0	0	0	0	5(5)	0
Acad	DF	(Republic of Ireland) Luke Rossi	0	0	0	0	1	0	0	0	1	0
Acad	DF	(Republic of Ireland) Sean Connell	0	0	0	0	2	0	0	0	2	0
Acad	DF	(Republic of Ireland) Leon Hudson	0	0	0	0	2	0	0	0	2	0
Acad	DF	(Republic of Ireland) Louis Burke	0	0	0	0	2	0	0	0	2	0
Acad	MF	(Republic of Ireland) Bobbie Malone	0	0	0	0	2	0	0	0	2	0
Acad	MF	(Republic of Ireland) Brendan O Connor	0	0	0	0	1	0	0	0	1	0
Acad	MF	(Republic of Ireland) Alex Snow	0	0	0	0	2	0	0	0	2	0
Acad	MF	(Republic of Ireland) Senan Boyle	0	0	0	0	2(1)	0	0	0	2(1)	0
Acad	FW	(Republic of Ireland) Tom Clarke	0	0	0	0	2(1)	0	0	0	2(1)	0
Acad	MF	(Republic of Ireland) Jack Birrell	0	0	0	0	2(2)	0	0	0	2(2)	0
Acad	DF	(Republic of Ireland) TJ Olusanya	0	0	0	0	2(2)	0	0	0	2(2)	0
Acad	MF	(Republic of Ireland) Aaron Culleton	0	0	0	0	1(1)	0	0	0	1(1)	0
Acad	MF	(Republic of Ireland) Sean Kenny-Naughton	0	0	0	0	1(1)	0	0	0	1(1)	0

=== Top Scorers ===
No.	Player	League	FAI Cup	LSC	Conf Lge	Total
9	(Republic of Ireland) Colm Whelan	13	2	0	0	15
26	(Republic of Ireland) Ross Tierney	11	0	0	1	12
18	(England) Douglas James-Taylor	6	0	0	3	9
7	(England) Connor Parsons	5	1	0	1	7
12	(United States) Patrick Hickey	5	0	0	1	6
11	(Republic of Ireland) Dayle Rooney	3	0	0	1	4
8	(Republic of Ireland) Harry Vaughan	3	1	0	0	4
10	(Republic of Ireland) Dawson Devoy	4	0	0	0	4
23	(England) Zane Myers	2	0	0	1	3
32	(Latvia) Markuss Strods	2	0	0	0	2
22	(Republic of Ireland) Sam Todd	2	0	0	0	2
24	(Republic of Ireland) Cian Byrne	2	0	0	0	2
6	(England) Jordan Flores	2	0	0	0	2
17	(Republic of Ireland) Adam McDonnell	1	0	0	0	1
3	(Republic of Ireland) Ryan Burke	1	0	0	0	1
33	(Republic of Ireland) Christopher Conlon	0	0	1	0	1
N/A	Own goal	1	1	0	0	2
Total		63	5	1	8	77

=== Hat tricks ===
No.	Player	Opposition	Goals	Result	Date	Competition
9	(Republic of Ireland) Colm Whelan	Sligo Rovers	3	0–4 (A)	14 February 2026	Premier Division

=== Clean Sheets ===
No.	Player	League	FAI Cup	LSC	Conf Lge	Total
1	(Poland) Kacper Chorążka	7/20	1/1	1/1	0/0	9/22
25	(United States) Paul Walters	4/16	0/2	0/0	2/6	6/24
30	(Northern Ireland) Finn McDonnell	0/0	0/0	0/2	0/0	0/2
Total		11/36	1/3	1/3	2/6	15/48

=== Discipline ===
No.	Pos.	Player	League			FAI Cup			LSC			Conf Lge			Total		
No.	Pos.	Player	Yellow card	(yellow card) (yellow-red card)	Red card	Yellow card	(yellow card) (yellow-red card)	Red card	Yellow card	(yellow card) (yellow-red card)	Red card	Yellow card	(yellow card) (yellow-red card)	Red card	Yellow card	(yellow card) (yellow-red card)	Red card
10	MF	(Republic of Ireland) Dawson Devoy	11	0	1	2	0	0	0	0	0	2	0	0	15	0	1
12	DF	(United States) Patrick Hickey	7	1	0	0	0	0	0	0	0	0	0	0	7	1	0
6	DF/MF	(England) Jordan Flores	5	0	0	1	0	0	0	0	0	1	0	0	7	0	0
26	MF	(Republic of Ireland) Ross Tierney	5	0	0	0	0	0	0	0	0	1	0	0	6	0	0
8	MF	(Republic of Ireland) Harry Vaughan	5	0	0	0	0	0	0	0	0	0	0	0	5	0	0
15	DF	(Republic of Ireland) Senan Mullen	5	0	0	0	0	0	0	0	0	0	0	0	5	0	0
22	DF	(Republic of Ireland) Sam Todd	4	0	0	0	0	0	0	0	0	1	0	0	5	0	0
11	MF	(Republic of Ireland) Dayle Rooney	2	0	0	0	0	0	0	0	0	2	0	0	4	0	0
7	MF	(England) Connor Parsons	2	0	0	0	0	0	0	0	0	2	0	0	4	0	0
16	DF	(Republic of Ireland) Darragh Power	3	0	0	0	0	0	0	0	0	1	0	0	4	0	0
17	MF	(Republic of Ireland) Adam McDonnell	2	1	0	0	0	0	0	0	0	1	0	0	3	1	0
5	MF	(England) Sadou Diallo	1	0	0	1	0	0	0	0	0	1	0	0	3	0	0
32	MF	(Latvia) Markuss Strods	2	0	0	0	0	0	0	0	0	0	0	0	2	0	0
24	DF	(Republic of Ireland) Cian Byrne	2	0	1	1	0	0	0	0	0	0	0	0	3	0	1
18	FW	(England) Douglas James-Taylor	1	0	0	0	0	0	0	0	0	1	0	0	2	0	0
23	MF	(England) Zane Myers	1	0	0	1	0	0	0	0	0	0	0	0	2	0	0
4	DF/MF	(Republic of Ireland) Niall Morahan	1	0	0	1	0	0	0	0	0	0	0	0	2	0	0
41	FW	(Republic of Ireland) Paddy Madden	0	0	0	1	0	0	0	0	0	0	0	0	1	0	0
25	GK	(United States) Paul Walters	1	0	0	0	0	0	0	0	0	0	0	0	1	0	0
Acad	DF	(Republic of Ireland) Sean Connell	0	0	0	0	0	0	1	0	0	0	0	0	1	0	0
Acad	MF	(Republic of Ireland) Sean Kenny-Naughton	0	0	0	0	0	0	0	0	1	0	0	0	0	0	1
Total			60	3	1	8	0	0	1	0	1	13	0	0	82	2	3

=== Captains ===
No.	Pos.	Player	No. Games	Notes
10	MF	Dawson Devoy	40	Captain
6	DF/MF	Jordan Flores	5	Vice-captain
17	MF	Adam McDonnell	1	
30	GK	Finn McDonnell	1	
33	MF	Christopher Conlon	1	

All information correct as of 30 October 2026

== International call-ups ==
=== Republic of Ireland National Team ===
Player	Fixture	Date	Location	Event
Dawson Devoy	vs. Qatar	28 May 2026	Dublin, Ireland	Friendly
Dawson Devoy	vs. Canada	6 June 2026	Montreal, Canada	Friendly

=== Republic of Ireland Under 21 National Team ===
Player	Fixture	Date	Location	Event
Harry Vaughan	vs. Croatia	6 June 2026	Zagreb, Croatia	Friendly
Harry Vaughan	vs. Qatar	9 June 2026	Zagreb, Croatia	Friendly

=== Republic of Ireland Under 17 National Team ===
Player	Fixture	Date	Location	Event
Curtis Egan	vs. Hungary	11 February 2026	Cádiz, Spain	Friendly
Curtis Egan	vs. Hungary	14 February 2026	Cádiz, Spain	Friendly
Josh Harpur	vs. Hungary	11 February 2026	Cádiz, Spain	Friendly
Josh Harpur	vs. Hungary	14 February 2026	Cádiz, Spain	Friendly
Josh Harpur	vs. Poland	25 March 2026	Brzeg, Poland	UEFA European Under-17 Championship Qualifiers
Josh Harpur	vs. Croatia	28 February 2026	Opole, Poland	UEFA European Under-17 Championship Qualifiers
Josh Harpur	vs. Slovakia	31 March 2026	Brzeg, Poland	UEFA European Under-17 Championship Qualifiers
Hugh Martin	vs. Hungary	11 February 2026	Cádiz, Spain	Friendly
Hugh Martin	vs. Hungary	14 February 2026	Cádiz, Spain	Friendly
Hugh Martin	vs. Poland	25 March 2026	Brzeg, Poland	UEFA European Under-17 Championship Qualifiers
Hugh Martin	vs. Croatia	28 February 2026	Opole, Poland	UEFA European Under-17 Championship Qualifiers
Hugh Martin	vs. Slovakia	31 March 2026	Brzeg, Poland	UEFA European Under-17 Championship Qualifiers
Hugh Martin	vs. (United States) USA	30 September 2026	Marbella, Spain	Friendly
Hugh Martin	vs. Netherlands	3 October 2026	Málaga, Spain	Friendly
Hugh Martin	vs. Norway	6 October 2026	Marbella, Spain	Friendly

=== Latvia National Team ===
Player	Fixture	Date	Location	Event
Markuss Strods	vs. Armenia	25 September 2026	Yerevan, Armenia	2026–27 UEFA Nations League
Markuss Strods	vs. Cyprus	28 September 2026	Riga, Latvia	2026–27 UEFA Nations League
Markuss Strods	vs. Montenegro	2 October 2026	Riga, Latvia	2026–27 UEFA Nations League
Markuss Strods	vs. Cyprus	5 October 2026	Nicosia, Cyprus	2026–27 UEFA Nations League

=== Latvia Under 21 National Team ===
Player	Fixture	Date	Location	Event
Markuss Strods	vs. (Georgia (country)) Georgia	27 March 2026	Kutaisi, Georgia	2027 UEFA European Under-21 Championship qualification
Markuss Strods	vs. Northern Ireland	31 March 2026	Riga, Latvia	2027 UEFA European Under-21 Championship qualification

== Awards ==
Player	Award
Ross Tierney	Bohemian FC Player of the Year
