= Day Shift =

A day shift is a shift in shift work.

Day Shift may also refer to:

- Day Shift (film), 2022 Netflix vampire movie starring Jamie Foxx
- Day Shift (Irish TV programme), sister programme to the Irish TV music programme Night Shift
- Revenue Retrievin': Day Shift, 2010 album

== See also ==
- Night Shift (disambiguation)
- Shift (disambiguation)
- Day (disambiguation)
