= Night Shift =

A night shift is either a group of workers night working, or the period in which they work.

Night Shift, Nightshift, or The Night Shift may also refer to:

== Film, TV, and video games ==
=== Film ===
- Night Shift (1944 film), a French-Italian film directed by Jean Faurez
- Night Shift (1982 film), an American film, one of Ron Howard's earliest directorial efforts
- The Night Shift (film), a 2011 American zombie comedy film
- Night Shift (2018 film), a Russian comedy film
- Night Shift (2020 film), a Franco-Belgian film
- Night Shift (2023 film), an American horror film
- Nightshift (2020 film), a Philippine horror film
- Nightshift (1981 film), a British avant-garde film
- Night Shifts (film), 2020 Canadian short comedy film

=== Television ===
- Night Shift (Hong Kong TV series), a Hong Kong crime thriller
- Night Shift (Irish TV programme), a 2006–2008 Irish musical TV programme broadcast on Channel 6
- Night Shift (British TV series), a British TV series shown late at night on ITV in 1993–1994 and again in 1998–2000
- The Night Shift (TV series), a 2014–2017 American medical drama TV series
- The Nightshift (TV programme), a 2010–2015 British TV programme broadcast on STV in Scotland
- "The Night Shift" (Brooklyn Nine-Nine), a TV episode
- "Night Shift" (The Thin Blue Line), a 1995 TV episode
- General Hospital: Night Shift, a primetime soap opera airing on SOAPnet during the summers of 2007 and 2008
- The Night Shift, or Næturvaktin, an Icelandic TV series
- "Nightshift", a 1998 episode of dinnerladies on BBC
- "Nightshift", a 2014 episode of the Sky Arts series Playhouse Presents

=== Video games ===
- Night Shift (video game), a 1990 computer game designed and published by LucasArts

== Music ==
- Night Shift (band), a Serbian rock band
- The Nightshift, a 1960s band with Jeff Beck
- Night Shift (album), a 1976 album by the rock band Foghat
- Nightshift (album), a 1985 album by the Commodores
  - "Nightshift" (song), from the album
- "Night Shift" (Jon Pardi song), 2016
- "Night Shift" (Lucy Dacus song), 2017
- The Night Shift (concert), a concert series by the Orchestra of the Age of Enlightenment
- Night Shift, a 2007 album by Danish band Turboweekend
- "Night Shift", a 1976 song by Bob Marley & The Wailers from Rastaman Vibration
- "Nightshift", a 1981 song by Siouxsie & The Banshees from Juju
- "Nightshift", a 1998 song by South Park Mexican from Hustle Town
- "Night Shift", a 2012 song by The Birthday Massacre released with Hide and Seek

== Print media ==
- Night Shift (comics), a fictional team of supervillains in the Marvel Universe
- Nightshift (magazine), a free monthly music magazine in Oxford, England
- Night Shift (short story collection), a 1978 collection by Stephen King
- Night Shift, a 1942 novel by Maritta Wolff

== Other uses ==
- Night Shift (software), an iOS and macOS software feature

== See also ==
- Shift work (disambiguation)
