= Shift work (disambiguation) =

Shift work is an employment practice designed to make use of the 24 hours of the clock, rather than a standard 8 hour working day.

Shift work may also refer to:

- Shift-Work (album), an album by The Fall
- "Shiftwork" (song), a song by Kenny Chesney and George Strait
- Shift Work (band), a London-based electronic duo
- Shift Work (1986 film), a British television film by Lesley Bruce in the anthology series ScreenPlay

== See also ==
- Shift work sleep disorder, a circadian rhythm sleep disorder
- Graveyard shift (disambiguation)
- Night Shift (disambiguation)
