= Sam Todd =

Sam Todd may refer to:

- Sam Todd (squash player), British squash player
- Sam Todd (footballer), Irish professional football player
