= Carndonagh Community School =

Secondary school in County Donegal, Ireland

Coordinates: 55°15′2″N 7°15′43″W

- Irish: Pobalscoil Charn Domhnaigh

Information
- Established: 1972; 54 years ago

Carndonagh Community School (Irish: Pobalscoil Charn Domhnaigh) is a secondary school located in Carndonagh, County Donegal, Ireland.

== History ==
Carndonagh Community School was formed in 1972 by the merger of Carndonagh College (a local boys' school), The Convent of Mercy Secondary School (a convent school for girls), and Carndonagh Vocational School (a large established co-educational school).

The late SDLP MLA and former Deputy Speaker of the Northern Ireland Assembly John Dallat also spent time employed as a teacher at the school.

== Education ==
Education at the school is based on the Irish Junior Certificate and Leaving Certificate curricula. The school once claimed to be the biggest school in Ireland with over 1600 pupils. This in fact was never the case despite school management claiming in returns to the Department of Education to have an enrollment of 1703 students. After an investigation, the actual numbers were found to be 1585, an overstatement of 118 non existent students. After this a new school was built in the neighboring town of Moville.

The current principal of the school is John McGuiness with Liz Kelly and Owen McConway as vice principals. The student population is over 1000 again at present.

== Sports ==
The school's senior soccer squad became All-Ireland champions following a 2-1 victory over Presentation Brothers College, Cork on 11 March 2016.

== Notable alumni ==
- Michelle Doherty, actress, model, TV host
- Paul Lynch, writer & winner of the 2023 Booker Prize.
- Charlie McConalogue, Fianna Fáil politician and current Minister of State for Law Reform
- Frank McGuinness, award winning writer
- Sam Todd, professional footballer.
