= Alistair Appleton =

English broadcaster and psychotherapist (born 1970)

- Born: 12 February 1970 (age 56); Royal Tunbridge Wells, Kent, England
- Occupations: Presenter, broadcaster, psychotherapist, meditation teacher
- Website: www.alistairappleton.com

Alistair Appleton (born 12 February 1970) is an English presenter, broadcaster, psychotherapist and meditation teacher.

== Early life and education ==
Born in Royal Tunbridge Wells, Kent, to Peter and Sally (née Cooper) Appleton, the younger of two sons, Alistair was brought up in Lee-on-the-Solent, Hampshire, where as a boy he sang in the church choir at St Faith's. He earned ten O-levels and three A-levels at St John's College, Portsmouth. In 1988, he went to Gonville and Caius College, Cambridge, where he studied English Literature.

== Career ==
On graduating with an upper second class degree, Appleton left the UK for Poland, where he took to writing poetry and helped to edit a children's anthology, as well as teaching at the University of Gdansk. He later taught English in eastern Germany and worked as a translator and journalist for Deutsche Welle television. Appleton broke into television with Deutsche Welle, and eventually became the frontman of the channel's youth current-affairs show Heat.

In 1999, Appleton returned to the UK, where he secured roles on Sky's Hot TV (2000), Five's House Doctor (2000–03), BBC Two's Rhona (2000), the Travel Channel's Travel On (2001), BBC One's Garden Invaders (2001), Cash in the Attic (2002–05), BBC Food's Stately Suppers (2005) and had an appearance as himself on the 2006 Doctor Who episode "Army of Ghosts". He has also hosted several television specials, including The Proms.

Appleton also did some acting, including a role in Footballers' Wives, during 2002. In 2005 he completed The Man Who Drank the Universe, a short documentary on the entheogen ayahuasca, an ancient plant brew from the Amazon.

In early January 2007, Appleton appeared in BBC America promotions for the fourth series of Cash in the Attic, even though he did not appear in that series. Since 2007, he has been one of the presenters for Escape to the Country on BBC television. He has also hosted the Orchestra of the Age of Enlightenment's late night concert series The Night Shift at London's South Bank.

In January 2016, he appeared on BBC One's Celebrity Mastermind, where he came joint second with 21 points, with a specialist subject of 20th-century European classical music.

Outside of television, Appleton works as a psychotherapist at his practice in Brighton and teaches and lectures on meditation. In 2014, he completed an MA in Advanced Psychotherapy.

== Personal life ==
Appleton is gay, and came out at university. In an article in Gay Times, however, he admits he only fully accepted his sexuality when he lived in Poland and Germany. As of August 2021, Appleton resided with his husband Daniel in a 1930s French sea captain's cottage in the port of Newhaven, East Sussex. As of 2026, Appleton resided in Cornwall.

In 2000 he converted to Buddhism. He later became a proponent of Ashtanga, the decision made after an unhappy period in his 30s. Appleton also considered becoming a monk while in Thailand, but a friend convinced him not to take that step.
