= Markuss Strods =

Latvian footballer (born 2006)

Personal information
- Full name: Markuss Strods
- Date of birth: 5 October 2006 (age 20)
- Place of birth: Rush, Dublin, Ireland
- Position: Midfielder

Team information
- Current team: Bohemians
- Number: 32

Youth career
- –2022: Rush Athletic
- 2022–2023: Dundalk
- 2023–2025: Bohemians

Senior career*
Years	Team	Apps	(Gls)
2024–	Bohemians	29	(2)

International career^{‡}
2023-2024	Latvia U17	3	(0)
2024-2025	Latvia U19	8	(1)
2025–2026	Latvia U21	5	(1)
2026–	Latvia	4	(1)
- * Club domestic league appearances and goals as of 16:46, 9 November 2026 (UTC) ‡ National team caps and goals as of 11:15, 8 October 2026 (UTC)

Markuss Strods (born 5 October 2006) is a professional footballer who plays as a midfielder for League of Ireland Premier Division club Bohemians. Born in Ireland, he plays for the Latvia national football team.

== Club career ==
=== Youth career ===
Strods is a native of Rush in North Dublin. As a youth he played Gaelic Football with St. Maur's in Rush before moving on to play football with Rush Athletic. His breakthrough came with Dundalk FC at under-17 level before progressing to the under-20 side in May 2022.

=== Bohemians ===
Strods went on to sign an academy deal at Bohemians in Dublin. Progressing through to the first team squad, he made his full senior debut for Bohs in a 1–1 draw in October 2024, away to Waterford in the League of Ireland Premier Division. On 24 April 2026, he scored his first goal for the club in extraordinary circumstances, netting after only 8 seconds in an eventual 3–1 loss away to St Patrick's Athletic at Richmond Park. Strods would go on to score his first home goal at Dalymount Park the following week against Derry City.

== International career ==
Strods represents Latvia through his parents. He has lined out for the Latvian national team at Under 17, Under 19 and Under 21 level. In May 2026, he missed out on a call up to the senior Latvia squad due to injury. In September 2026, Strods was named in Paolo Nicolato's Latvia senior squad for the first time, for their four 2026–27 UEFA Nations League C fixtures, taking place in September and October.

== Career statistics ==
As of match played on 30 October 2026

Appearances and goals by club, season and competition
Club	Season	League			National Cup (Note: Includes FAI Cup)		Europe		Other		Total	
Club	Season	Division	Apps	Goals	Apps	Goals	Apps	Goals	Apps	Goals	Apps	Goals
Bohemians	2024	LOI Premier Division	1	0	0	0	–		2 (Note: Appearance(s) in the Leinster Senior Cup)	0	3	0
Bohemians	2025	LOI Premier Division	5	0	1	2	–		3	3	9	4
Bohemians	2026	LOI Premier Division	23	2	1	0	5 (Note: Appearances in the UEFA Conference League)	0	1	0	30	2
Bohemians	Total		29	2	2	2	5	0	6	3	42	7
Career Total			29	2	2	2	5	0	6	3	42	7

=== International ===
As of match played 5 October 2026

Appearances and goals by national team and year
National team	Year	Apps	Goals
Latvia	2026	4	1
Total		4	1

Scores and results list Latvia's goal tally first, score column indicates score after each Strods goal.

List of international goals scored by Markuss Strods
No.	Date	Venue	Cap	Opponent	Score	Result	Competition
1	2 October 2026	Skonto Stadium, Riga, Latvia	3	Montenegro	1–2	1–2	2026–27 UEFA Nations League C
