= Zane Myers =

English footballer (born 2005)

Personal information
- Full name: Zane Harley Myers
- Date of birth: 11 August 2005 (age 21)
- Place of birth: London, England
- Position: Winger

Team information
- Current team: Bohemians
- Number: 23

Youth career
- –2021: Chelsea
- 2021–2024: Swansea City
- 2024: Millwall
- 2024–2026: Hull City

Senior career*
Years	Team	Apps	(Gls)
2025–2026	Hull City	0	(0)
2025	→ Scarborough Athletic (loan)	7	(0)
2026–	Bohemians	21	(2)
- * Club domestic league appearances and goals as of 20:56, 18 November 2026 (UTC)

Zane Harley Myers (born 11 August 2005) is an English professional footballer who plays as a winger for League of Ireland Premier Division club Bohemians.

== Club career ==
=== Youth career ===
Myers came through the academy at Chelsea before joining Swansea City's academy on 7 July 2021. He remained there until January 2024 when he joined Millwall's academy for a short term spell before moving to Hull City's academy on 21 August 2024.

=== Hull City ===
Having come through the academy, Myers' first involvement with Hull City's first-team came in January 2025, when he was an unused substitute for an FA Cup tie with Doncaster Rovers and then an EFL Championship fixture against Queens Park Rangers. In May 2025, he signed a new contract with the club. On 22 January 2026, he departed Hull City on a permanent basis.</ref>

==== Scarborough Athletic loan ====
On 19 September 2025, Myers joined National League North club Scarborough Athletic on a one-month loan deal.</ref>

=== Bohemians ===
On 22 February 2026, he signed for League of Ireland Premier Division club Bohemians. On 10 April 2026, he scored the first goal of his senior career, opening the scoring in the 8th minute of a 2–1 defeat to Sligo Rovers at Dalymount Park. On 13 August 2026, he made his first appearance in European competition, scoring in a 3–2 defeat away to Midtjylland in the UEFA Conference League.

== Career statistics ==
As of match played on 30 October 2026

Appearances and goals by club, season and competition
Club	Season	League			National Cup (Note: Includes FA Cup & FAI Cup)		League Cup (Note: Includes Welsh League Cup & EFL Cup)		Europe		Other		Total	
Club	Season	Division	Apps	Goals	Apps	Goals	Apps	Goals	Apps	Goals	Apps	Goals	Apps	Goals
Swansea City	2023–24	—			—		2	0	—		—		2	0
Hull City	2024–25	EFL Championship	0	0	0	0	0	0	–		–		0	0
Hull City	2025–26	EFL Championship	0	0	0	0	0	0	–		–		0	0
Hull City	Total		0	0	0	0	0	0	–		–		0	0
Scarborough Athletic (loan)	2025–26	National League North	7	0	—		—		—		—		7	0
Bohemians	2026	LOI Premier Division	21	2	2	0	—		1 (Note: Appearances in the UEFA Conference League)	1	0 (Note: Appearances in the Leinster Senior Cup)	0	24	3
Career total			28	2	2	0	2	0	1	1	0	0	33	3
