= Kacper Chorążka =

Polish footballer

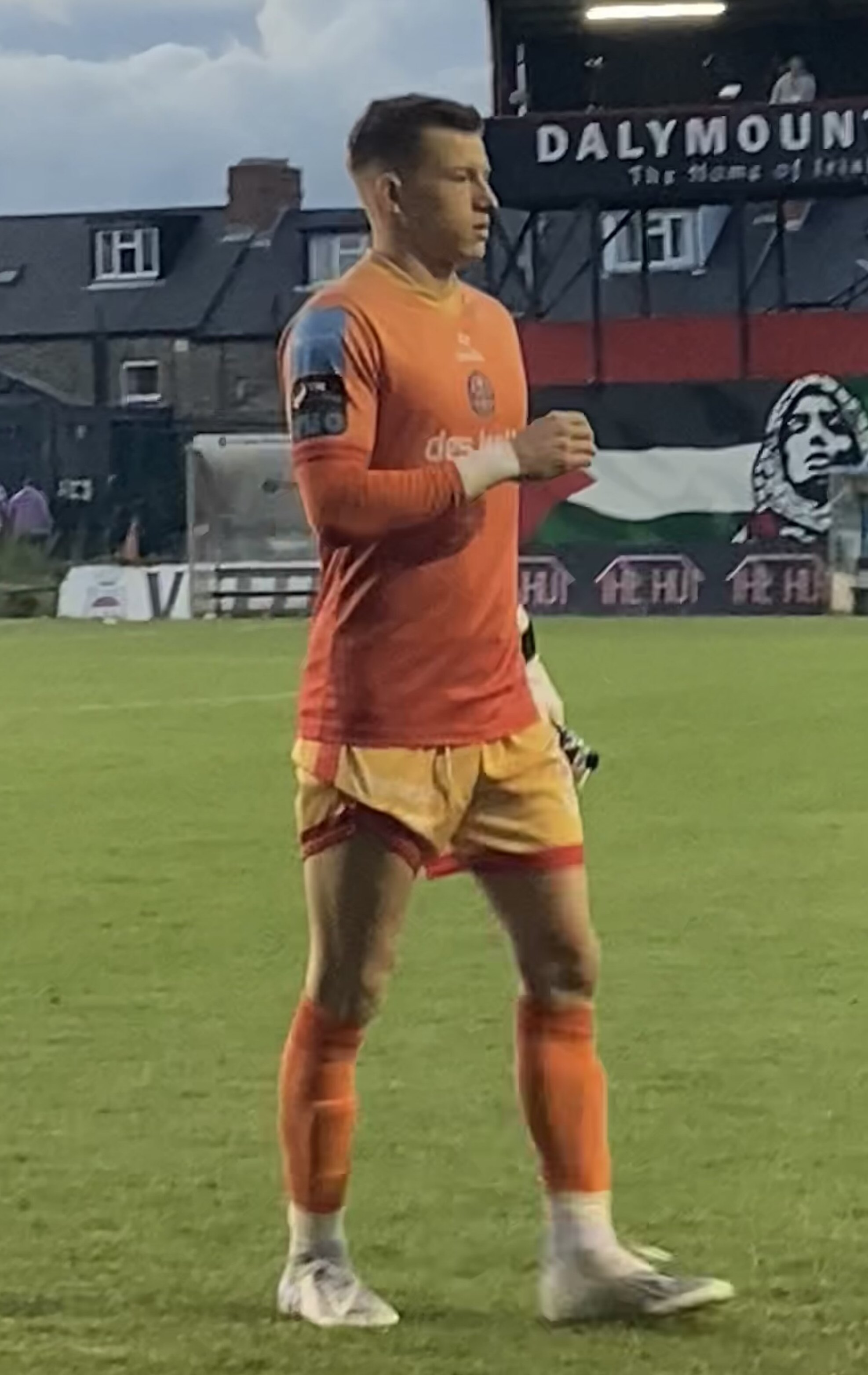
- Chorążka with Bohemians in 2024

Personal information
- Date of birth: 18 March 1999 (age 27)
- Place of birth: Kraków, Poland
- Height: 1.90 m (6 ft 3 in)
- Position: Goalkeeper

Team information
- Current team: Bohemians
- Number: 1

Youth career
- –2017: Wisła Kraków

Senior career*
Years	Team	Apps	(Gls)
2017–2020	Wisła Kraków	0	(0)
2018	→ Raków Częstochowa (loan)	0	(0)
2019	→ Hutnik Kraków (loan)	9	(0)
2019–2020	→ Zagłębie Sosnowiec (loan)	5	(0)
2020–2021	Zagłębie Sosnowiec	9	(0)
2021–2022	Omonia	0	(0)
2022–2023	Ermis Aradippou	27	(0)
2023–2024	ASIL Lysi	18	(0)
2024–	Bohemians	83	(0)

International career
2014	Poland U15	3	(0)
2014	Poland U16	1	(0)
- * Club domestic league appearances and goals as of 14:43, 1 June 2026 (UTC)

Kacper Chorążka (born 18 March 1999) is a Polish professional footballer who plays as a goalkeeper for League of Ireland Premier Division club Bohemians. On 1 January 2027, he will join Shamrock Rovers.

== Career ==
=== Early career ===
At the age of 17, Chorążka trialed for Manchester United, England's most successful club, after trialing for Rangers in Scotland. In 2018, he was sent on loan to Polish second division side Raków Częstochowa from Wisła Kraków in the Polish top flight. Before the second half of the 2018–19 season, he was sent on loan to Polish fourth division team Hutnik Kraków.

=== Zagłębie Sosnowiec ===
In 2019, Chorążka signed for Zagłębie Sosnowiec in the Polish second division, initially on loan, where he made 14 league appearances. On 7 June 2020, he debuted for Zagłębie Sosnowiec during a 2–1 win over Stomil Olsztyn.

=== Omonia ===
Before the second half of the 2020–21 season, Chorążka signed for Cypriot top flight outfit Omonia. He made no appearances for the club before being released on 3 June 2022.

=== Ermis Aradippou ===
On 7 July 2022, he joined Cypriot Second Division side Ermis Aradippou, signing a one-year contract.

=== ASIL Lysi ===
On 5 August 2023, Chorążka moved to ASIL Lysi on a one-year deal, with an extension option.

=== Bohemians ===
On 8 February 2024, it was announced that Chorążka had signed a multi-year contract with Bohemians in the League of Ireland Premier Division, which was extended until the end of 2026 in October 2024. On 12 June 2026, he missed a league game away to Derry City to get married, in doing so he lost his place in the starting team to loanee goalkeeper Paul Walters who saved a penalty in the match, missing out on playing in any of the club's UEFA Conference League fixtures later that summer as a result. With Chorążka having played just once cup game between June and the end of the season, in October 2026 he was linked with a move to Bohemians' rivals Shamrock Rovers on a free transfer with his Bohs contract up at the end of the season. On 5 November 2026, Chorążka announced that he would be departing Bohemians at the end of the year.

=== Shamrock Rovers ===
On 20 November 2026, Shamrock Rovers confirmed the signing of Chorążka.

== Career statistics ==
As of match played 16 August 2026

Appearances and goals by club, season and competition
Club	Season	League			National cup (Note: Includes Cypriot Cup and FAI Cup)		Europe		Other		Total	
Club	Season	Division	Apps	Goals	Apps	Goals	Apps	Goals	Apps	Goals	Apps	Goals
Wisła Kraków	2017–18	Ekstraklasa	0	0	0	0	—		—		0	0
Raków Częstochowa (loan)	2018–19	I liga	0	0	0	0	—		—		0	0
Hutnik Kraków (loan)	2018–19	III liga, group IV	9	0	—		—		—		9	0
Zagłębie Sosnowiec (loan)	2019–20	I liga	5	0	0	0	—		—		5	0
Zagłębie Sosnowiec	2020–21	I liga	9	0	0	0	—		—		9	0
Omonia	2021–22	Cypriot First Division	0	0	0	0	0	0	0	0	0	0
Ermis Aradippou	2022–23	Cypriot Second Division	27	0	1	0	—		—		28	0
ASIL Lysi	2023–24	Cypriot Second Division	18	0	0	0	—		—		18	0
Bohemians	2024	LOI Premier Division	34	0	4	0	—		—		38	0
Bohemians	2025	LOI Premier Division	29	0	0	0	—		0	0	29	0
Bohemians	2026	LOI Premier Division	20	0	1	0	0	0	1 (Note: Appearance(s) in the Leinster Senior Cup)	0	22	0
Bohemians	Total		83	0	5	0	0	0	1	0	89	0
Career total			151	0	6	0	0	0	1	0	158	0
