= Paul Walters (soccer) =

American soccer player (born 2004)

Personal information
- Full name: Paul Girard-Walters
- Date of birth: April 11, 2004 (age 22)
- Place of birth: West Chester, Ohio, United States
- Height: 1.90 m (6 ft 3 in)
- Position: Goalkeeper

Team information
- Current team: FC Cincinnati
- Number: 25

Youth career
- –2019: Lakota West Firebirds
- 2019–2022: FC Cincinnati

College career
Years	Team	Apps	(Gls)
2022	Northwestern Wildcats	4	(0)

Senior career*
Years	Team	Apps	(Gls)
2022–2025	FC Cincinnati 2	45	(0)
2023–	FC Cincinnati	0	(0)
2024	→ Hartford Athletic (loan)	6	(0)
2026	→ Bohemians (loan)	16	(0)
- * Club domestic league appearances and goals as of 19:04, 18 November 2026 (UTC)

Paul Girard-Walters (born 11 April 2004) is an American professional association footballer who plays as a goalkeeper for Major League Soccer club FC Cincinnati.

== Club career ==
=== Early career ===
Walters is a native of West Chester, Ohio, a suburb of Cincinnati and attended Lakota West High School, playing with the school team the Firebirds until he joined FC Cincinnati's academy in 2019. In 2022, he committed to Northwestern University, where he would play college soccer in the Big 10 Conference for the Northwestern Wildcats, but departed after making four appearances in his one year there to return to the FC Cincinnati academy.

=== FC Cincinnati ===
On 20 January 2023, Walters signed for FC Cincinnati as a homegrown player on a contract until the end of 2026, with the option of a further year, making him the sixth ever player in club history to sign a first-team contract after coming through the academy. Having continued to get game time with FC Cincinnati 2 in the MLS Next Pro, Walters had to wait until 6 August 2024 to make his first-team debut for FC Cincinnati, in a 4–2 win at home to New York City FC in the Leagues Cup.

==== Hartford Athletic loan ====
On 4 March 2024, Walters joined USL Championship team Hartford Athletic on loan. He made 7 appearances in all competitions during his loan spell.

==== Bohemians loan ====
On 15 January 2026, Walters joined League of Ireland Premier Division club Bohemians on a season-long loan deal. Having remained backup to Polish goalkeeper Kacper Chorążka in the first 20 league games of the season, Walters broke into the team on 12 June 2026, saving a penalty in a 4–1 loss away to Derry City. That performance saw him keep his place in the starting team for the rest of the season, including for their entire UEFA Conference League campaign that summer.

== Career statistics ==
As of match played 30 October 2026

Appearances and goals by club, season and competition
Club	Season	League			National Cup (Note: Includes U.S. Open Cup & FAI Cup)		Continental		Other		Total	
Club	Season	Division	Apps	Goals	Apps	Goals	Apps	Goals	Apps	Goals	Apps	Goals
FC Cincinnati 2	2022	MLS Next Pro	1	0	–		–		–		1	0
FC Cincinnati 2	2023	MLS Next Pro	18	0	–		–		–		18	0
FC Cincinnati 2	2024	MLS Next Pro	13	0	–		–		1 (Note: Appearance in the 2024 MLS Next Pro Playoffs)	0	14	0
FC Cincinnati 2	2025	MLS Next Pro	13	0	1	0	–		1 (Note: Appearance in the 2025 MLS Next Pro Playoffs)	0	15	0
FC Cincinnati 2	Total		45	0	1	0	—		2	0	48	0
FC Cincinnati	2023	Major League Soccer	0	0	0	0	–		0 (Note: Appearance(s) in the Leagues Cup)	0	0	0
FC Cincinnati	2024	Major League Soccer	0	0	0	0	0 (Note: Appearance(s) in the CONCACAF Champions Cup)	0	1	0	1	0
FC Cincinnati	2025	Major League Soccer	0	0	0	0	0	0	0	0	1	0
FC Cincinnati	Total		0	0	0	0	0	0	1	0	1	0
Hartford Athletic (loan)	2024	USL Championship	6	0	1	0	—		—		7	0
Bohemians (loan)	2026	LOI Premier Division	16	0	2	0	6 (Note: Appearances in the UEFA Conference League)	0	0 (Note: Appearance(s) in the Leinster Senior Cup)	0	24	0
Total			67	0	4	0	6	0	3	0	80	0
