= Michelle Doherty =

Irish broadcaster and model

- Born: County Donegal, Ireland
- Occupations: Actress, radio and television presenter, model, dj
- Known for: Xposé (Entertainment/celebrity gossip TV show) presenter, presenting Night Shift, Radio presenter Phantom FM (now TXFM)
- Partner: Mark O'Shea
- Children: 1
- Website: MichelleDoherty.com

Michelle Doherty is an Irish radio/television presenter, model, actress, and DJ. She has presented various television shows including Xposé, a daily entertainment/celebrity gossip TV show on TV3 in Ireland, Arthur's Day, RTÉ Two television series Under Ether, the weekday breakfast show, Pure Morning on Phantom FM now TXFM, and Night Shift and Day Shift on Channel 6 for a number of years before the closure of the station on 31 December 2008.

== Career ==
Doherty started as a model with Morgan The Agency. She had her career break working in Dublin, Ireland, as an air stewardess for the airline Aer Lingus. She entered the Miss Ireland pageant in both 1995 and 1997, the latter of which she was Miss Belfast. She was among twelve well-known women who took part in the "Max Factor Salutes Great Moments in Fashion" show for which she was styled in vintage fashions and hair styles, photographed by fashion photographer Sarah Doyle and wore a figure-hugging black dress by Louise Kennedy for a portrait which was then sold off at a charity auction. She presented Night Shift, the short lived alternative music show on Channel Six, seven nights per week and also on two weekend afternoons. The decision not to renew the show left both her and Elton Mullally, the co-presenter of the show, feeling "completely bewildered, and absolutely gutted".

An online campaign to reinstate her on the new 3e roster was launched immediately. The programme is rumoured to be returning in 2014. Doherty's other careers have included a radio show, Finest Work Songs and Pure Morning on Phantom 105.2, co-hosting of the next-to-inaugural Choice Music Prize at Vicar Street, Dublin in February 2007 and being nominated for an IFTA. She also had a presenting role during the Arthur's Day events in Dublin in 2009. She has presented (When) Under Ether for RTÉ Two on Tuesday nights.

She presented Haiti Aid on 3 February 2010 at Whelan's and The Village in Dublin.

Doherty played the part of "Liv" in Lenny Abrahamson's critically acclaimed, award-winning film What Richard Did and played the lead role, Katelin Ballantine, in independent Irish film The Hit Producer.

== Personal life ==
Doherty is originally from Inishowen in County Donegal. After spending many years between London, Dublin and Melbourne, she recently relocated with her family to Sydney where she currently resides.

== Awards and nominations ==
As well as being nominated for an IFTA, Doherty has also been nominated for Ireland's TV Personality of the Year award.

Doherty has won the Best Irish Radio DJ category in the Hot Press Annual Poll in 2009 and 2010 becoming the first ever female DJ to do so.
