= Connor Parsons =

English professional footballer (b.2000)

Personal information
- Full name: Connor Riece George Parsons
- Date of birth: 26 October 2000 (age 26)
- Position: Midfielder

Team information
- Current team: Bohemians
- Number: 7

Youth career
- –2019: Norwich City

Senior career*
Years	Team	Apps	(Gls)
2019–2020	Norwich United	11	(4)
2020–2021	Lowestoft Town	5	(0)
2021	Tindastóll	0	(0)
2021	Dalvík/Reynir	6	(3)
2021–2023	Wycombe Wanderers	0	(0)
2021–2022	→ Notts County (loan)	3	(0)
2022	→ Bromley (loan)	11	(1)
2022	→ Solihull Moors (loan)	10	(0)
2023–2024	Waterford	66	(9)
2025	Dagenham & Redbridge	2	(0)
2025–	Bohemians	54	(6)
- * Club domestic league appearances and goals as of 18:03, 31 October 2026 (UTC)

Connor Riece George Parsons (born 26 October 2000) is an English professional footballer who plays as a midfielder for League of Ireland Premier Division club Bohemians.

== Career ==
=== Early career ===
Parsons played as a youth with Norwich City, leaving the club in December 2019 by mutual consent. He then played for Norwich United, scoring 5 goals in 12 games in all competitions, before signing for Lowestoft Town in October 2020. After scoring 1 goal in 7 games in all competitions, he left the club in March 2021 to sign for Icelandic club Tindastóll. He moved to Dalvík/Reynir in April 2021, for whom he made seven appearances.

=== Wycombe Wanderers ===
He returned to the UK to sign a one-year contract with Wycombe Wanderers in August 2021. On 31 August 2021, Parsons scored his first goal for the club in a 3-1 English Football League Trophy loss to Aston Villa U21s. On 26 November 2021, Parsons joined National League side Notts County on loan until 29 January 2022. On 4 February 2022 Parsons signed for National League side Bromley on an initial one-month loan. On 2 March 2022, the loan deal was extended until the end of the season. On 10 May 2022, Parsons was recalled by his parent club after 11 appearances. His Wycombe contract was renewed for the 2022–23 season.

In August 2022 he moved on loan to Solihull Moors.

=== Waterford ===
In December 2022 it was announced that he would sign for Irish club Waterford in January 2023. On 10 November 2023, Parsons scored in a 2–1 win over Cork City, in the League of Ireland Promotion/Relegation Play-off, as his side gained promotion to the League of Ireland Premier Division. On 30 November 2023, Parsons signed a new contract with the club for the 2024 League of Ireland Premier Division season. On 12 November 2024, it was announced that Parsons had departed the club following the end of his contract.

=== Dagenham & Redbridge ===
On 13 December 2024, Parsons agreed to join National League side Dagenham & Redbridge on a permanent deal from January 2025.

=== Bohemians ===
On 4 February 2025, Parsons returned to the League of Ireland Premier Division, signing for Bohemians on a multi-year contract for an undisclosed fee.

== Personal life ==
After his release from Norwich City, Parsons "built a social media audience" and had 40,000 subscribers on YouTube as of October 2020. In June 2022 he featured in a Sky Sports YouTube video, in which Joël Matip and Jürgen Klopp had to guess which person from 5 was a professional footballer.

== Career statistics ==
As of match played on 30 October 2026

Appearances and goals by club, season and competition
Club	Season	League			National Cup (Note: Includes FA Cup, Icelandic Cup & FAI Cup)		League Cup (Note: Includes EFL Cup & National League Cup)		Other		Total	
Club	Season	Division	Apps	Goals	Apps	Goals	Apps	Goals	Apps	Goals	Apps	Goals
Norwich United	2019–20	ECL Premier Division	11	4	0	0	—		1 (Note: Appearance(s) in the First Division Cup)	1	12	5
Lowestoft Town	2020–21	Southern Football League	5	0	0	0	—		2 (Note: Appearance(s) in the FA Trophy)	1	7	1
Tindastóll	2021	3. deild	0	0	—		—		—		0	0
Dalvík/Reynir	2021	3. deild	6	3	1	0	—		—		7	3
Wycombe Wanderers	2021–22	EFL League One	0	0	0	0	0	0	3 (Note: Appearance(s) in the EFL Trophy)	1	3	1
Wycombe Wanderers	2022–23	EFL League One	0	0	0	0	1	0	1	0	2	0
Wycombe Wanderers	Total		0	0	0	0	1	0	4	1	5	1
Notts County (loan)	2021–22	National League	3	0	—		—		1	0	4	0
Bromley (loan)	2021–22	National League	11	1	—		—		—		11	1
Solihull Moors (loan)	2022–23	National League	10	0	1	0	—		—		11	0
Waterford	2023	LOI First Division	33	6	2	1	—		6 (Note: 2 appearances in the Munster Senior Cup; 4 appearances, 1 goal in the 2023 League of Ireland Promotion/Relegation Playoffs)	1	41	8
Waterford	2024	LOI Premier Division	33	3	2	0	—		1 (Note: Appearance(s) in the Munster Senior Cup)	0	36	3
Waterford	Total		66	9	4	1	—		7	1	77	11
Dagenham & Redbridge	2024–25	National League	2	0	0	0	1	0	—		3	0
Bohemians	2025	LOI Premier Division	22	1	2	0	—		0 (Note: Appearance(s) in the Leinster Senior Cup)	0	24	1
Bohemians	2026	LOI Premier Division	32	5	3	1	—		5 (Note: Appearance(s) in the UEFA Conference League)	1	40	7
Bohemians	Total		54	6	5	1	—		5	1	64	8
Career total			163	22	11	2	2	0	20	5	196	29
