= The Night Shift (concert) =

The logo for The Night Shift

The Night Shift is the name given to a series of concerts run by the Orchestra of the Age of Enlightenment. As a Resident Orchestra at the Southbank Centre, the first Night Shift took place on 22 May 2006 at the Queen Elizabeth Hall. Since then there have been fifteen further concerts at venues including the Queen Elizabeth Hall, Royal Festival Hall, The Roundhouse and the Corn Exchange, Brighton Dome.

The Night Shift aims to "present classical music in a new way to attract an audience that rarely or never attends classical music". It is characterised by its lack of formalities traditionally associated with classical music and key features include the following:

- Pre and post concert entertainment such as DJs, Folk and Jazz groups, VJs and dance
- Drinks promotions and drinks allowed in the concert hall,
- A relaxed atmosphere in the concert hall; the audience is encouraged to move, talk and clap as they wish.
- The concert is presented from the stage and includes interviews with performers and questions from the audience.

Ticket prices are kept low, typically £8 in advance, £12 on the door and £4 for students. To date there have been over 7500 attendances at Night Shift events, with a peak audience of 1,200 at The Roundhouse on 29 January 2010, where Vladimir Jurowski conducted Beethoven’s Coriolan Overture and Symphony No. 7. The one-hour concert was presented by Alistair Appleton, accompanied by live video projections. Other artists to have appeared at The Night Shift include Robin Ticciati, Marin Alsop, Rachel Podger, Edward Gardner, Christian Tetzlaff, Eduardo Portal, Stephen Hough and Yannick Nézet-Séguin.

On 13 August 2010 The Night Shift debuted at Wilton’s Music Hall in London’s East End, performing a programme of Handel and Purcell, played on seventeenth-century instruments, with a support show from Nathan ‘Flutebox’ Lee, the beatboxing flute player.

In January 2010, independent research into The Night Shift was produced which revealed a number of trends. All Night Shift surveys showed a high proportion of 25- to 34-year-olds, followed by 19- to 24-year-olds and 35- to 44-year-olds, with few attendees over the age of 45, and approximately 30-40% of ticket sales attributed to students. Major motivating factors included competitive ticket pricing, informal atmosphere and the influence of friends. The research gave the following conclusion:

In short, The Night Shift is cool. The Night Shift succeeds in reversing all negative preconceptions of live classical music concerts: in the course of an hour or so attendees moved from expectations that the experience will be expensive, formal, long, middle aged, proper, strict and stuffy to an understanding that it can be accessible, comfortable, inclusive, informal, laid back, relaxing, spontaneous and studenty. The OAE is doing a service to the entire sector.

Another piece of independent research published in August 2010 highlighted the effectiveness of the use of embedded information in The Night Shift concert format. It found that the use of audience participation, verbal introductions, explanations from the stage and demonstrations of different ways of playing the same passage of music all helped create a more inclusive atmosphere and build a rapport with audience members, particularly those relatively unfamiliar with classical music.

In October 2010 The Independent stated "concerts like this ensure classical music’s future".
