= Sadou Diallo =

English footballer

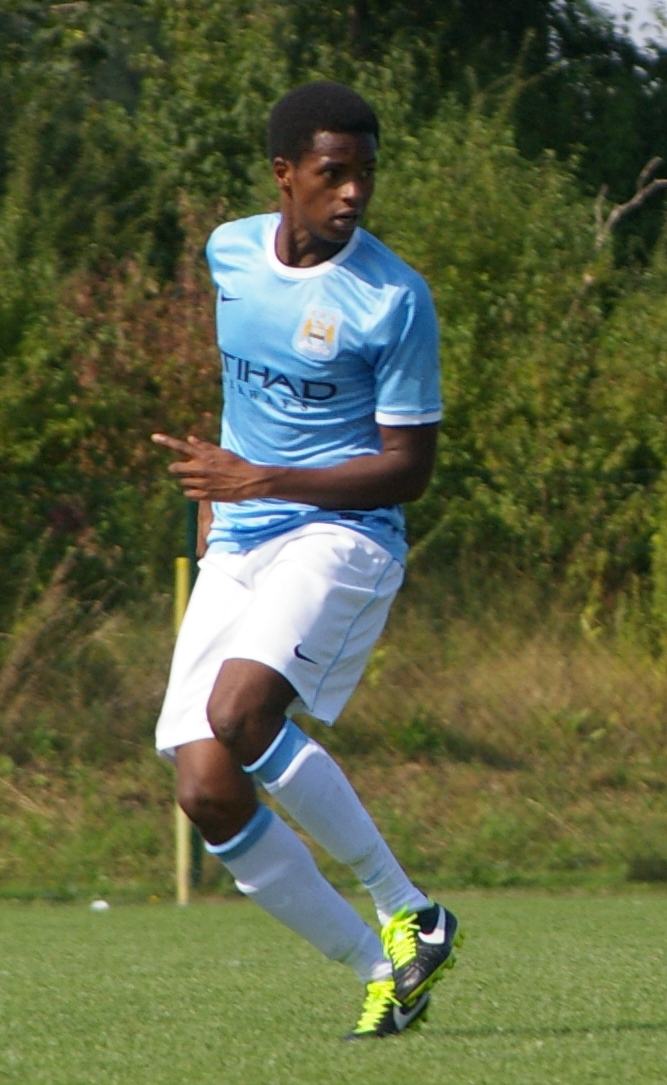
- Diallo playing for Manchester City in 2013.

Personal information
- Full name: Sadou Diallo
- Date of birth: 10 June 1999 (age 27)
- Place of birth: Conakry, Guinea
- Height: 1.88 m (6 ft 2 in)
- Position: Midfielder

Team information
- Current team: Bohemians
- Number: 5

Youth career
- 2012–2018: Manchester City
- 2018–2019: Wolverhampton Wanderers

Senior career*
Years	Team	Apps	(Gls)
2019–2021	Wolverhampton Wanderers	0	(0)
2019–2020	→ Accrington Stanley (loan)	9	(0)
2021–2022	Forest Green Rovers	9	(0)
2022–2025	Derry City	86	(4)
2026–	Bohemians	20	(0)

International career
2017	England U19	1	(0)
- * Club domestic league appearances and goals as of 18:03, 31 October 2026 (UTC)

Sadou Diallo (born 10 June 1999) is a professional footballer who plays for League of Ireland Premier Division club Bohemians as a midfielder. Born in Guinea, he has represented England at youth level.

== Early and personal life ==
Diallo was born in Conakry, Guinea, and lived there until the age of 8, when he moved to Rotherham, England with his mother. He is a practising Muslim, meaning he abstains from drinking alcohol and also fasts during the month of Ramadan as part of his faith.

== Club career ==
=== Early career ===
Diallo began his career with Manchester City at the age of 13, moving to Wolverhampton Wanderers in August 2018. He signed on loan for Accrington Stanley in September 2019. He scored his first professional goal in an EFL Trophy tie against Oldham Athletic on 8 October 2019. He was released by Wolves at the end of the 2020–21 season.

=== Forest Green Rovers ===
On 2 July 2021 it was announced that Forest Green Rovers had signed Diallo.

=== Derry City ===
On 15 July 2022, Derry City announced the signing of Diallo on an 18-month contract. Diallo cited Derry player Will Patching, who played with Diallo at Manchester City, as helping convince him to sign for the club. In the 2023–24 UEFA Europa Conference League Diallo scored twice as Derry eliminated Havnar Bóltfelag and Kuopion Palloseura. On 23 November 2023, he signed a new two-year-contract with the club. He departed Derry at the end of his contract in November 2025, having made 108 appearances in all competitions during his three and a half years with the club.

=== Bohemians ===
On 22 January 2025, Diallo signed for League of Ireland Premier Division club Bohemians.

== International career ==
He has represented England at under-19 youth level.

== Career statistics ==
As of match played on 30 October 2026

Appearances and goals by club, season and competition
Club	Season	League			National Cup (Note: Imcludes FA Cup & FAI Cup)		League Cup (Note: Includes EFL Cup)		Europe		Other		Total	
Club	Season	Division	Apps	Goals	Apps	Goals	Apps	Goals	Apps	Goals	Apps	Goals	Apps	Goals
Manchester City U21s	2017–18	—			—		—		—		1 (Note: Appearance(s) in the EFL Trophy.)	0	1	0
Wolverhampton Wanderers U21s	2018–19	—			—		—		—		3	0	3	0
Wolverhampton Wanderers	2019–20	Premier League	0	0	0	0	0	0	0	0	—		0	0
Wolverhampton Wanderers	2020–21	Premier League	0	0	0	0	0	0	—		—		0	0
Wolverhampton Wanderers	Total		0	0	0	0	0	0	0	0	0	0	0	0
Accrington Stanley (loan)	2019–20	League One	9	0	0	0	0	0	—		1	1	10	1
Forest Green Rovers	2021–22	League Two	9	0	1	0	2	0	—		4	0	16	0
Derry City	2022	LOI Premier Division	13	1	4	1	—		—		—		17	2
Derry City	2023	LOI Premier Division	30	0	2	0	—		6 (Note: Appearances in the UEFA Europa Conference League)	2	1 (Note: Appearance in the President of Ireland's Cup)	0	39	2
Derry City	2024	LOI Premier Division	21	1	5	0	—		2 (Note: Appearances in the UEFA Conference League)	0	—		28	1
Derry City	2025	LOI Premier Division	22	2	2	0	—		—		—		24	2
Derry City	Total		86	4	13	1	0	0	8	2	1	0	108	7
Bohemians	2026	LOI Premier Division	20	0	2	0	—		4	0	1 (Note: Appearances in the Leinster Senior Cup)	0	27	0
Career total			124	4	16	1	2	0	12	2	11	1	165	8

== Honours ==
Forest Green Rovers

- League Two: 2021–22
