= Graveyard Shift =

Graveyard shift is a work shift running through the late hours of the night through the early hours of the morning, typically from midnight until 8 am.

Graveyard Shift may also refer to:

== Media ==
- Graveyard Shift (1987 film), by Jerry Ciccoritti
- Graveyard Shift (1990 film), based on the Stephen King story of the same name
- Graveyard Shift (2005 film), a 2005 Russian comedy film
- Graveyard Shift (SpongeBob SquarePants), TV series episode
- Graveyard Shift, a mission in the video game Hitman 2: Silent Assassin
- Graveyard Shift, a mission in Manhunt (video game)
- Graveyard slot, a time period in which a television audience is very small compared to other times of the day
- Graveyard Shift, a name of street league in the video game Need for Speed Payback

== Literature ==
- Graveyard Shift (short story), by Stephen King
- Graveyard Shift, a 1960 short story by Richard Matheson
- The Graveyard Shift (novel), by Harry Patterson
- The Graveyard Shift, a short novel by William P. McGivern featured in Alfred Hitchcock's Anthology – Volume 4

== Music ==
- “Graveyard Shift”, a song by Stela Cole from the 2020 extended play Woman of the Hour
- "Graveyard Shift", a song by Uncle Tupelo from the 1990 album No Depression
- "Graveyard Shift", a song by Sam Roberts from the album Collider
- "Graveyard Shift", a song by Steve Earle from the album The Mountain
- "Graveyard Shift", a song by Kardinal Offishall from the 2008 album Not 4 Sale
- "Graveyard Shift", a song by John Zorn from the 1989 album Naked City
- "Graveyard Shift", a song by Afroman from the 2000 album Because I Got High
- "Graveyard Shift", a piece by NomeansNo from the 2010 album One
- Graveyard Shift, a side-project of Jani Liimatainen and former bandmate Henrik Klingenberg
- Graveyard Shift (album), an album by Motionless in White
- The Graveyard Shift (album), a mixtape by 40 Glocc and Spider Loc
- Graveyard Shift, an American hip-hop group, part of Mo Thugs
