= Sam Todd (footballer) =

Irish footballer (born 1998)

Personal information
- Date of birth: 28 April 1998 (age 28)
- Place of birth: Letterkenny, County Donegal, Ireland
- Height: 1.85 m (6 ft 1 in)
- Position: Defender

Team information
- Current team: Bohemians
- Number: 22

Youth career
- 2015–2017: Derry City

Senior career*
Years	Team	Apps	(Gls)
2016–2018	Derry City	0	(0)
2018	→ Finn Harps (loan)	26	(4)
2019–2020	Finn Harps	48	(0)
2021–2023	UCD	50	(3)
2023–2025	Derry City	45	(1)
2024	→ Larne (loan)	13	(0)
2026–	Bohemians	29	(2)
- * Club domestic league appearances and goals as of 16:43, 9 November 2026 (UTC)

Sam Todd is an Irish professional footballer who plays as a defender for League of Ireland Premier Division club Bohemians.

== Career ==
=== Youth career ===
Todd grew up in Carndonagh, County Donegal, and attended Carndonagh Community School. He signed for the Derry City academy in 2015, and played for their under-19 team in the truncated 2015, 2016, and 2017 seasons. He represented his school nationally in FAI Schools competition, scoring the winning goal as they defeated St. Eunan's College to lift the Dr. Tony O'Neill Senior Ulster Cup in February 2017. Todd appeared on the bench for the Derry City senior squad throughout the 2017 season without making a first-team appearance.

=== Finn Harps ===
Todd joined League of Ireland First Division side Finn Harps on loan in January 2018. He made his professional debut in March 2018 against Shelbourne. He appeared 26 times in the league that season, scoring 4 goals as Finn Harps reached the promotion play-offs. He went on to appear in both legs of both play-offs, clinching promotion to the Premier Division. Todd joined Finn Harps on a permanent basis in December 2018. He remained first-choice centre-back for the club over the following 2 seasons in the Premier Division.

=== UCD ===
Todd left Finn Harps at the end of the 2020 season to join UCD on a scholarship deal.

=== Derry City ===
Todd remained at UCD until July 2023 when he returned to Derry City. Todd was loaned to NIFL Premiership champions Larne in August 2024. While on loan made 5 appearances in the 2024–25 UEFA Conference League league phase. Todd returned to Derry City in January 2025 for the beginning of their season. In August 2025, he drew interest from EFL League Two club Walsall.

=== Bohemians ===
On 22 November 2025, it was announced that Todd would be joining fellow League of Ireland Premier Division club Bohemians on a multi-year contract.

== Career statistics ==
As of match played on 30 October 2026

Appearances and goals by club, season and competition
Club	Season	League			National Cup (Note: Includes FAI Cup)		League Cup (Note: Includes League of Ireland Cup & Northern Ireland Football League Cup)		Europe		Other		Total	
Club	Season	Division	Apps	Goals	Apps	Goals	Apps	Goals	Apps	Goals	Apps	Goals	Apps	Goals
Derry City	2016	LOI Premier Division	0	0	0	0	0	0	–		–		0	0
Derry City	2017	LOI Premier Division	0	0	0	0	0	0	1 (Note: Appearance(s) in the UEFA Europa League)	0	–		1	0
Derry City	2018	LOI Premier Division	0	0	–		–		–		–		0	0
Derry City	Total		0	0	0	0	0	0	1	0	–		1	0
Finn Harps (loan)	2018	LOI First Division	26	4	1	1	2	0	–		4 (Note: Appearances in the 2018 League of Ireland Promotion/Relegation Playoffs)	0	35	5
Finn Harps	2019	LOI Premier Division	32	0	1	0	2	0	–		2 (Note: Appearances in the 2019 League of Ireland Promotion/Relegation Playoffs)	0	37	0
Finn Harps	2020	LOI Premier Division	16	0	3	0	–		–		–		19	0
Finn Harps	Total		48	0	4	0	2	0	–		2	0	56	0
UCD	2021	LOI First Division	26	1	3	0	–		–		4 (Note: Appearances in the 2021 League of Ireland Promotion/Relegation Playoffs)	0	33	1
UCD	2022	LOI Premier Division	24	2	3	0	–		–		1 (Note: Appearance in the 2022 League of Ireland Promotion/Relegation Playoffs)	0	28	2
UCD	2023	LOI Premier Division	0	0	0	0	–		–		0 (Note: Appearance(s) in the Leinster Senior Cup)	0	0	0
UCD	Total		50	3	6	0	–		–		5	0	61	3
Derry City	2023	LOI Premier Division	5	0	0	0	–		0 (Note: Appearance(s) in the UEFA Europa Conference League)	0	–		5	0
Derry City	2024	LOI Premier Division	10	0	2	1	–		2 (Note: Appearance(s) in the UEFA Conference League)	0	–		14	1
Derry City	2025	LOI Premier Division	30	1	2	0	–		–		–		32	1
Derry City	Total		45	1	4	1	–		2	0	–		51	2
Larne (loan)	2024–25	NIFL Premiership	13	0	–		1	0	5	0	0 (Note: Appearance(s) in the County Antrim Shield)	0	19	0
Bohemians	2026	LOI Premier Division	29	2	0	0	–		5	0	0	0	34	2
Career total			211	10	15	2	5	0	13	0	11	0	255	12
