= Senan Mullen =

Irish footballer (born 2005)

Personal information
- Date of birth: 28 February 2005 (age 21)
- Place of birth: Cootehill, Ireland
- Height: 1.91 m (6 ft 3 in)
- Positions: Defender; midfielder

Team information
- Current team: Torino

Youth career
- Dundalk
- 2024–2025: Torino

Senior career*
Years	Team	Apps	(Gls)
2022–2023	Dundalk	4	(0)
2024–	Torino	0	(0)
2025–2026	→ Mantova (loan)	2	(0)
2026	→ Bohemians (loan)	24	(0)

International career^{‡}
2022	Republic of Ireland U17	3	(0)
2022	Republic of Ireland U18	1	(0)
2023	Republic of Ireland U19	4	(0)
- * Club domestic league appearances and goals as of 19:08, 18 November 2026 (UTC) ‡ National team caps and goals as of 21 November 2023 (UTC)

Senan Mullen (born 28 February 2005) is an Irish professional footballer who plays as a defender or midfielder for Serie A club Torino.

== Early life ==
Mullen was born on 28 February 2005 in Cootehill, County Cavan, Ireland. Growing up, he competed in boxing.

== Club career ==
As a youth player, Mullen joined the academy of Irish side Dundalk and was promoted to the club's senior team in 2022, where he made four league appearances and scored zero goals.

Following his stint there, he joined the youth academy of Serie A side Torino in 2024 and was promoted to the club's senior team in 2025. Ahead of the 2025–26 season, he was sent on loan to Serie B side Mantova. On 27 January 2026, he joined League of Ireland Premier Division club Bohemians on a season-long loan deal.

== International career ==
Mullen is a Republic of Ireland youth international. During March 2022, he played for the Republic of Ireland national under-17 football team for 2022 UEFA European Under-17 Championship qualification.

== Career statistics ==
As of match played on 30 October 2026

Appearances and goals by club, season and competition
Club	Season	League			National Cup (Note: Includes FAI Cup & Coppa Italia)		Other		Total	
Club	Season	Division	Apps	Goals	Apps	Goals	Apps	Goals	Apps	Goals
Dundalk	2022	LOI Premier Division	0	0	0	0	—		0	0
Dundalk	2023	LOI Premier Division	4	0	0	0	0	0	4	0
Dundalk	Total		4	0	0	0	0	0	4	0
Torino	2023–24	Serie A	0	0	—		—		0	0
Torino	2024–25	Serie A	0	0	0	0	—		0	0
Torino	2025–26	Serie A	0	0	—		—		0	0
Torino	2026–27	Serie A	0	0	—		—		0	0
Torino	Total		0	0	0	0	0	0	0	0
Mantova (loan)	2025–26	Serie B	2	0	0	0	—		2	0
Bohemians (loan)	2026	LOI Premier Division	24	0	3	0	5 (Note: Appearances in the UEFA Conference League)	0	32	0
Career Total			30	0	3	0	5	0	38	0
