= Colm Whelan =

Irish footballer

Personal information
- Date of birth: 29 June 2000 (age 26)
- Place of birth: Thomastown, County Kilkenny, Ireland
- Height: 1.80 m (5 ft 11 in)
- Position: Striker

Team information
- Current team: Bohemians
- Number: 9

Youth career
- –2016: Thomastown United
- 2016–2019: Waterford

Senior career*
Years	Team	Apps	(Gls)
2017–2019	Waterford	1	(0)
2020–2022	UCD	58	(37)
2023–2024	Derry City	13	(3)
2025–	Bohemians	69	(17)

International career^{‡}
2021	Republic of Ireland U21	3	(1)
- * Club domestic league appearances and goals as of 16:39, 9 November 2026 (UTC) ‡ National team caps and goals as of 17:15, 15 January 2025 (UTC)

Colm Whelan (born 29 June 2000) is an Irish professional footballer who plays as a striker for League of Ireland Premier Division club Bohemians. His previous clubs are Waterford, UCD and Derry City.

== Career ==
=== Youth career ===
A native of Thomastown, County Kilkenny, Whelan began playing with his local club Thomastown United, before moving to the academy of Waterford in 2016, where he played for the under 17 side for two seasons before making his first team debut.

=== Waterford ===
On 7 October 2017, Whelan made his senior debut for Waterford in the final game of the season in a 2–1 loss away to Cobh Ramblers as his side won the 2017 League of Ireland First Division title to gain promotion. The club's promotion to the League of Ireland Premier Division proved to be a hindrance to Whelan's game time, as he only made 2 appearance in 2018, a 1–0 loss away to Sligo Rovers and a 3–0 loss to Cork City, before making 1 final appearance for the club in 2019, in a 3–1 win over Heart of Midlothian Colts in the Scottish Challenge Cup.

=== UCD ===
Whelan signed for League of Ireland First Division club UCD ahead of the 2020 season and scored on his debut on 16 February 2020 in a 1–1 draw away to Wexford at Ferrycarrig Park. Whelan had an impressive first full season at senior level, scoring 15 goals in 21 appearances in all competitions. The 2021 season proved to be even more impressive, both individually and collectively, as scored 25 goals in 31 games in all competitions, culminating on 26 November 2021 with Whelan scoring the winner in a 2–1 victory over his former club Waterford in the League of Ireland Promotion/Relegation Playoff Final at Richmond Park. Whelan was named League of Ireland Player of the Month for November 2021. On 21 December 2021, following the club's promotion, Whelan turned down offers from elsewhere within the league, to sign a new contract with UCD in order to complete his degree at the college. Whelan scored 4 goals in 15 games in the first half of the 2022 season, with his performances attracting interest of several English clubs including Lincoln City, but an Anterior cruciate ligament injury suffered in a 1–0 win away to Finn Harps on 13 May 2022 scuppered any move for the striker in the short term.

=== Derry City ===
On 30 November 2022, Whelan signed for League of Ireland Premier Division club Derry City on a 2-year contract. Still injured upon signing, he had to wait until 21 April 2023 for his debut, which came in a 3–1 win away to Cork City in which Whelan scored his side's third goal of the game. Having also scored on his second appearance for the club in a 2–0 win at home to St Patrick's Athletic, disaster struck again on 1 May 2023, when Whelan suffered a second Anterior cruciate ligament injury in the space of 12 months in a 2–0 loss to Shamrock Rovers at the Ryan McBride Brandywell Stadium, in just his third appearance for the club. Whelan made his return from injury on 28 June 2024, in a 5–1 win over Drogheda United. On 10 November 2024, Whelan came off the bench in the 2024 FAI Cup final in a 2–0 defeat to Drogheda United at the Aviva Stadium in what turned out to be his final game for the club.

=== Bohemians ===
On 13 November 2024, Whelan signed a multi-year contract with Bohemians ahead of their 2025 season. He made his debut for the club against Shamrock Rovers, replacing Lys Mousset from the bench in a 1–0 win at the Aviva Stadium on 16 February 2025. On 7 March 2025, he scored his first goals for the club in a 3–0 win away to Waterford, in which he scored hat-trick against his former club, including 2 penalties.

== International career ==
Whelan received his first call up to the Republic of Ireland U21 team in May 2021. He made his debut for the side on 9 September 2021, scoring in a 1–1 draw away to Luxembourg U21. On 12 November 2021, his third and final appearance for the side was his first start at international level, in a 2–0 loss at home to Italy U21.

== Career statistics ==
As of match played on 30 October 2026

Appearances and goals by club, season and competition
Club	Season	League			National Cup (Note: Includes FAI Cup)		League Cup (Note: Includes League of Ireland Cup)		Europe		Other		Total	
Club	Season	Division	Apps	Goals	Apps	Goals	Apps	Goals	Apps	Goals	Apps	Goals	Apps	Goals
Waterford	2017	LOI First Division	1	0	0	0	0	0	—		0 (Note: Appearance(s) in the Munster Senior Cup)	0	1	0
Waterford	2018	LOI Premier Division	0	0	0	0	1	0	—		1	0	2	0
Waterford	2019	LOI Premier Division	0	0	0	0	0	0	—		1 (Note: Appearance(s) in the Scottish Challenge Cup)	0	1	0
Waterford	Total		1	0	0	0	1	0	—		2	0	4	0
UCD	2020	LOI First Division	19	15	1	0	—		—		1 (Note: Appearance in the 2020 League of Ireland Promotion/Relegation Playoffs)	0	21	15
UCD	2021	LOI First Division	24	18	3	3	—		—		4 (Note: Appearances in the 2021 League of Ireland Promotion/Relegation Playoffs)	4	31	25
UCD	2022	LOI Premier Division	15	4	0	0	—		—		0 (Note: Appearances in the 2022 League of Ireland Promotion/Relegation Playoff)	0	15	4
UCD	Total		58	37	4	3	—		—		5	4	67	44
Derry City	2023	LOI Premier Division	3	2	0	0	—		0 (Note: Appearance(s) in the UEFA Europa Conference League)	0	0 (Note: Appearance in the President of Ireland's Cup)	0	3	2
Derry City	2024	LOI Premier Division	10	1	3	0	—		2 (Note: Appearance(s) in the UEFA Conference League)	0	—		15	1
Derry City	Total		13	3	3	0	—		2	0	0	0	18	3
Bohemians	2025	LOI Premier Division	33	4	2	4	—		—		0 (Note: Appearance(s) in the Leinster Senior Cup)	0	35	8
Bohemians	2026	LOI Premier Division	36	13	2	2	—		5	0	1	0	44	15
Bohemians	Total		69	17	4	6	—		5	0	1	0	79	23
Career total			141	57	11	9	1	0	7	0	8	4	158	70

== Honours ==
=== Club ===
Waterford

- League of Ireland First Division (1): 2017

Derry City

- President of Ireland's Cup (1): 2023

=== Individual ===
- PFAI First Division Team of the Year (2): 2020, 2021
- League of Ireland First Division Top Goalscorer: 2021 (18 goals)
- League of Ireland Player of the Month (1): November 2021
