= Adam McDonnell =

Irish footballer

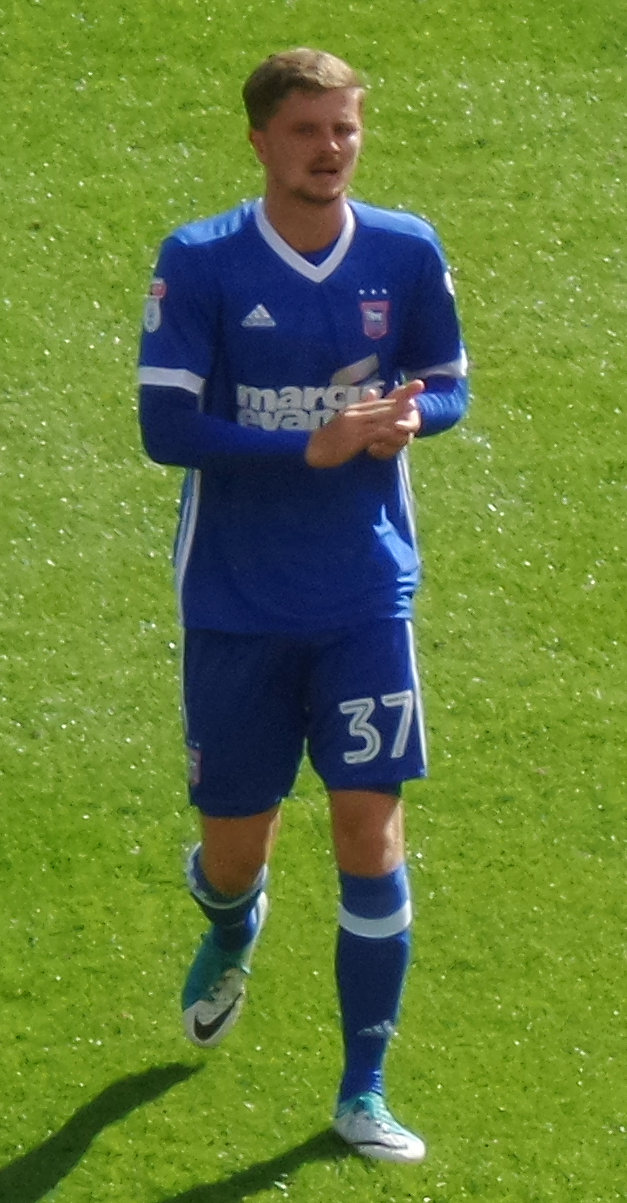
- Adam McDonnell playing for Ipswich Town in 2017

Personal information
- Full name: Adam Patrick McDonnell
- Date of birth: 14 May 1997 (age 29)
- Place of birth: Ballymun, Dublin, Republic of Ireland
- Position: Midfielder

Team information
- Current team: Bohemians
- Number: 17

Youth career
- 2001–: Tolka Rovers
- –2011: Home Farm
- 2011–2014: Shelbourne

Senior career*
Years	Team	Apps	(Gls)
2014	Shelbourne	7	(1)
2014–2018	Ipswich Town	2	(0)
2017–2018	→ Aldershot Town (loan)	16	(3)
2018–2019	Aldershot Town	55	(8)
2019–2021	Boreham Wood	25	(1)
2021–2022	Sligo Rovers	49	(4)
2023–	Bohemians	124	(4)

International career^{‡}
2012	Republic of Ireland U16	3	(1)
2014	Republic of Ireland U17	5	(1)
2014–2015	Republic of Ireland U18	2	(0)
2014–2015	Republic of Ireland U19	3	(0)
- * Club domestic league appearances and goals as of 23:04, 29 October 2026 (UTC) ‡ National team caps and goals as of 16:54, 26 January 2018 (UTC)

Adam Patrick McDonnell (born 14 May 1997) is an Irish professional footballer who plays as a midfielder for League of Ireland Premier Division side Bohemians.

== Early life ==
McDonnell spent his early years in Ballymun before moving to Blanchardstown. He started playing for Tolka Rovers around the age of four. He then spent time with Home Farm, before signing for Shelbourne at 16.

== Playing career ==
=== Ipswich Town ===
McDonnell signed with Ipswich Town from Shelbourne in August 2014, having previously had trials at Manchester United and Bolton Wanderers. However, he was unable to feature for Ipswich until his 18th birthday due to FIFA regulations, much to manager Mick McCarthy's annoyance. He made his debut on 25 August 2015, in a 4–1 League Cup victory over Doncaster Rovers at the Keepmoat Stadium.

==== Aldershot Town (loan) ====
On 30 August McDonnell was loaned out to Vanarama National League side Aldershot Town where he made 14 appearances and scored 4 goals. McDonnell was recalled from loan in December 2017 due to injury problems at Ipswich Town. He featured on the bench in an EFL Championship game against Wolverhampton Wanderers which Ipswich Town went on to lose 1–0 at the Molineux Stadium.

=== Return to Aldershot Town ===
On 26 January 2018, following his release from Ipswich, McDonnell returned to Aldershot Town on a one-and-a-half-year deal.

=== Boreham Wood ===
On 1 July 2019, McDonnell signed for fellow National League side Boreham Wood, signing a two-year deal.

=== Sligo Rovers ===
On 11 July 2021, McDonnell signed for Sligo Rovers. McDonnell was a regular for Sligo Rovers, featuring in 32 league games in 2022 and starting 29 of those games.

=== Bohemians ===
On 11 November 2022, at the end of the season, McDonnell signed for fellow Irish side Bohemians.

== Career statistics ==
As of match played 12 October 2026

Appearances and goals by club, season and competition
Club	Season	League			National Cup (Note: Includes FAI Cup & FA Cup)		League Cup (Note: Includes League of Ireland Cup & EFL Cup)		Other		Total	
Club	Season	Division	Apps	Goals	Apps	Goals	Apps	Goals	Apps	Goals	Apps	Goals
Shelbourne	2014	LOI First Division	7	1	0	0	0	0	—		7	1
Shelbourne	Total		7	1	0	0	0	0	—		7	1
Ipswich Town	2015–16	Championship	1	0	0	0	1	0	—		2	0
Ipswich Town	2016–17	Championship	0	0	0	0	0	0	—		0	0
Ipswich Town	2017–18	Championship	1	0	0	0	2	0	—		3	0
Ipswich Town	Total		2	0	0	0	3	0	—		5	0
Aldershot Town (loan)	2017–18	National League	16	3	2	0	—		1 (Note: Appearance in FA Trophy)	0	19	3
Aldershot Town	2017–18	National League	14	2	0	0	—		1 (Note: Appearance in National League play-offs)	0	15	2
Aldershot Town	2018–19	National League	41	6	3	1	—		0	0	44	7
Aldershot Town	Total		71	11	5	1	—		2	0	78	12
Boreham Wood	2019–20	National League	17	1	1	0	—		1	0	19	1
Boreham Wood	2020–21	National League	8	0	2	0	—		0	0	10	0
Boreham Wood	Total		25	1	3	0	—		1	0	29	1
Sligo Rovers	2021	LOI Premier Division	17	1	0	0	—		1 (Note: Appearances in UEFA Europa Conference League)	0	18	1
Sligo Rovers	2022	LOI Premier Division	32	3	1	0	—		6	0	39	3
Sligo Rovers	Total		49	4	1	0	—		7	0	57	4
Bohemians	2023	LOI Premier Division	33	3	4	1	—		1 (Note: Appearances in Leinster Senior Cup)	0	38	4
Bohemians	2024	LOI Premier Division	35	0	3	0	—		0	0	38	0
Bohemians	2025	LOI Premier Division	31	0	2	0	—		1	0	34	0
Bohemians	2026	LOI Premier Division	25	1	2	0	—		5 (Note: 4 appearances in UEFA Conference League; 1 appearance in Leinster Senior Cup)	0	32	1
Bohemians	Total		124	4	11	1	—		7	0	142	5
Career total			268	21	20	2	3	0	17	0	318	23

== Honours ==
Individual

- Aldershot Town Player of the Year: 2018–19
