= Harry Vaughan (footballer) =

Irish footballer

Personal information
- Full name: Harry Patrick Vaughan
- Date of birth: 6 April 2004 (age 22)
- Place of birth: Trafford, England
- Height: 5 ft 6 in (1.68 m)
- Position: Midfielder

Team information
- Current team: Bohemians
- Number: 8

Youth career
- 2009–2014: Manchester United
- 2021: Oldham Athletic

Senior career*
Years	Team	Apps	(Gls)
2021–2023	Oldham Athletic	32	(1)
2022	→ Radcliffe (loan)	4	(0)
2023–2026	Hull City	16	(0)
2024	→ Bristol Rovers (loan)	11	(0)
2026	→ Bohemians (loan)	18	(3)
2026–	Bohemians	12	(0)

International career^{‡}
2021–2023	Republic of Ireland U19	8	(0)
2024–2026	Republic of Ireland U21	8	(0)
- * Club domestic league appearances and goals as of 18:00, 31 October 2026 (UTC) ‡ National team caps and goals as of 00:21, 18 November 2026 (UTC)

Harry Patrick Vaughan (born 6 April 2004) is a professional footballer who plays as a midfielder for League of Ireland Premier Division club Bohemians.

== Club career ==
=== Early career ===
Vaughan played in the academy of Manchester United from the age of 5 to 10 years old, before leaving the club due to suffering from a blood condition called Anemia, combined with "falling out of love" with the game saw him stop playing the game for several years before joining Oldham Athletic in early 2021.

=== Oldham Athletic ===
Vaughan made his first-team debut for Oldham Athletic on 23 February 2021, coming on for Marcus Barnes with 15 minutes left to play of a 1–0 defeat to Barrow at Boundary Park. Head coach Harry Kewell said that "clearly he's not afraid of anything, which is good". On 14 December 2022, Vaughan joined Northern Premier League side Radcliffe on a one-month youth loan.

=== Hull City ===
On 31 January 2023, Vaughan joined Hull City on an 18-month contract. He made his debut for the Tigers in the 0–0 draw away at Blackburn Rovers on 15 April 2023.

On 1 February 2024, Vaughan joined League One club Bristol Rovers on loan until the end of the season. He made his debut from the bench two days later, replacing George Friend with around ten minutes remaining in a 1–0 victory over Exeter City. Having failed to establish himself in the first-team, manager Matt Taylor confirmed that his absence from matchday squads were due to a lack of contribution during the opportunities he had been given, noting that the loan had been a great learning curve for the player.

=== Bohemians ===
On 8 January 2026, Vaughan joined League of Ireland Premier Division club Bohemians on loan until the end of June 2026. On 10 June 2026, Hull City announced that he would be released at the end of his contract. On 29 June 2026, Vaughan signed a permanent contract with Bohemians until the end of the season.

== International career ==
Although born in England, Vaughan qualifies to play for the Republic of Ireland due to Irish heritage on his Mother's side. On 4 October 2021, he was called up to the Republic of Ireland U19 squad for the first time, for their double header of friendlies against Sweden U19 in Marbella, Spain. He made his underage international debut on 8 October 2021 in a 2–2 draw with Sweden. Vaughan was called up to the Republic of Ireland U21s for the first time on 6 June 2023 for the team's friendly fixtures against Gabon U23, Ukraine U21 & Kuwait U22 in Austria on 13, 16 & 19 June 2023. He made his debut for the U21s in a 2–0 defeat to Sweden U21 in a friendly in Marbella, Spain on 14 November 2024. On 1 June, Vaughan was called up to the U21 squad to face Croatia and Qatar in a duo of friendly matches in Zagreb.

== Style of play ==
Vaughan has been described as an intelligent midfielder who is quick with the ball at his feet.

== Statistics ==
As of match played on 30 October 2026

Club	Season	League			National Cup (Note: Includes FA Cup)		League Cup (Note: Includes EFL Cup)		Other		Total	
Club	Season	Division	Apps	Goals	Apps	Goals	Apps	Goals	Apps	Goals	Apps	Goals
Oldham Athletic	2020–21	EFL League Two	6	0	0	0	0	0	0 (Note: Appearances in the EFL Trophy)	0	6	0
Oldham Athletic	2021–22	EFL League Two	23	1	1	0	3	0	3	1	30	2
Oldham Athletic	2022–23	National League	3	0	0	0	–		0 (Note: Appearances in the FA Trophy)	0	3	0
Oldham Athletic	Total		32	1	1	0	3	0	3	1	39	2
Hull City	2022–23	EFL Championship	5	0	0	0	–		–		5	0
Hull City	2023–24	EFL Championship	8	0	2	0	0	0	–		10	0
Hull City	2024–25	EFL Championship	3	0	1	0	0	0	–		4	0
Hull City	2025–26	EFL Championship	0	0	—		0	0	–		0	0
Hull City	Total		16	0	3	0	0	0	–		19	0
Bristol Rovers (loan)	2023–24	League One	12	0	—		—		–		12	0
Bohemians (loan)	2026	LOI Premier Division	18	3	—		—		0	0	18	3
Bohemians	2026	LOI Premier Division	12	0	3	1	—		6 (Note: Appearances in UEFA Conference League)	0	21	1
Career total			90	4	7	1	3	0	9	1	109	6
