= John McGovern (footballer, born 2002) =

Irish footballer (born 2002)

Personal information
- Full name: John McGovern
- Date of birth: 17 October 2002 (age 24)
- Place of birth: Newry, Northern Ireland
- Position: Striker

Team information
- Current team: Shamrock Rovers
- Number: 88

Youth career
- –2019: Windmill Stars
- 2019: Newry City

Senior career*
Years	Team	Apps	(Gls)
2019–2024	Newry City	94	(18)
2024–2025	Dungannon Swifts	34	(13)
2025–	Shamrock Rovers	42	(10)

International career^{‡}
2019	Northern Ireland U19	2	(0)
2021–2022	Northern Ireland U21	7	(0)
- * Club domestic league appearances and goals as of 17:41, 9 November 2026 (UTC) ‡ National team caps and goals as of 16:36, 22 July 2025 (UTC)

John McGovern (born 17 October 2002) is a Northern Irish professional footballer who plays as a striker for League of Ireland Premier Division club Shamrock Rovers.

== Career ==
=== Youth career ===
Newry, County Down native McGovern began playing football with local club Windmill Stars, before moving to Newry City in 2019.

=== Newry City ===
On 31 July 2019, McGovern signed for NIFL Championship club Newry City's senior team, despite being just 16 years of age. On 31 August 2019, he scored the first goal of his senior career, in a 2–2 draw at home to Knockbreda. He scored 9 goals in 33 appearances to help the club win the 2021–22 NIFL Championship to win promotion to the NIFL Premiership. On 24 November 2023, he played alongside his younger brother Paul, who was aged 15, for the first time, in a 3–0 defeat to Glenavon. He departed his hometown club in the summer of 2024 after they were relegated to the NIFL Championship.

=== Dungannon Swifts ===
On 12 June 2024, McGovern signed for NIFL Premiership club Dungannon Swifts on a two-year-contract. On 3 May 2025, McGovern scored in the final of the 2024–25 Irish Cup as his side defeated Cliftonville on penalties after a 1–1 draw at Windsor Park. He scored 20 goals in 41 appearances in all competitions in his first season with the club.

=== Shamrock Rovers ===
On 27 May 2025, it was announced that McGovern had signed for League of Ireland Premier Division club Shamrock Rovers for an undisclosed fee, with the transfer officially going through on 1 July 2025. He scored his first goal for the club in a 4–0 victory away to Gibraltarian side St Joseph's in the UEFA Conference League second qualifying round on 24 July 2025. On 9 March 2026, he scored his first league goal for the club on his 15th league appearance, in a 2–2 draw away to Shelbourne at Tolka Park.

== International career ==
In 2019, McGovern was capped twice for the Northern Ireland U19 side, before receiving seven caps for the Northern Ireland U21 side from 2021 to 2022.

== Personal life ==
He is the older brother of fellow professional footballer Paul McGovern who plays for Scottish Premiership side Falkirk, with the pair previously having played together for Newry City. McGovern is a former member of the Down GAA senior Gaelic football team, winning the Tailteann Cup in 2024. He has completed a degree in Business and IT at Queen's University Belfast, graduating in 2025.

== Career statistics ==
As of match played on 30 October 2026

Appearances and goals by club, season and competition
Club	Season	League			National Cup (Note: Includes the Irish Cup & FAI Cup)		League Cup (Note: Includes the Northern Ireland Football League Cup)		Europe		Other		Total	
Club	Season	Division	Apps	Goals	Apps	Goals	Apps	Goals	Apps	Goals	Apps	Goals	Apps	Goals
Newry City	2019–20	NIFL Championship	22	4	0	0	0	0	–		–		22	4
Newry City	2021–22	NIFL Championship	33	9	3	0	1	0	–		–		37	9
Newry City	2022–23	NIFL Premiership	18	4	1	1	0	0	–		–		19	5
Newry City	2023–24	NIFL Premiership	21	1	1	0	1	0	–		–		23	1
Newry City	Total		94	18	5	1	2	0	–		–		106	19
Dungannon Swifts	2024–25	NIFL Premiership	34	13	5	5	2	2	–		–		41	20
Shamrock Rovers	2025	LOI Premier Division	11	0	4	1	–		9 (Note: Appearance(s) in the UEFA Conference League)	2	–		24	3
Shamrock Rovers	2026	LOI Premier Division	31	10	1	2	–		2 (Note: Appearance(s) in the UEFA Champions League)	1	1 (Note: Appearance in the President of Ireland's Cup)	0	35	13
Shamrock Rovers	Total		42	10	5	3	–		11	3	1	0	59	16
Career total			170	41	15	9	4	2	11	3	1	0	201	55

== Honours ==
Newry City

- NIFL Championship: 2021–22

Dungannon Swifts

- Irish Cup: 2024–25

Shamrock Rovers

- League of Ireland Premier Division: 2025
- FAI Cup: 2025
