= Night Shift (Irish TV programme) =

Irish television music show

- Country of origin: Ireland
- No. of seasons: 2
- No. of episodes: over 500

Production
- Running time: 120 minutes

Original release
- Network: Channel 6
- Release: 30 March 2006 – 31 December 2008

Related
- Day Shift

Night Shift is an Irish television music programme. Like its sister show Day Shift, it was one of Channel 6's Irish programme. It was launched with the network on Thursday, 30 March 2006. Night Shift was transmitted late at night and sometimes early on weekend mornings. The show was hosted by Michelle Doherty and featured the alternative music scene. In 2006, Night Shift was voted the favourite music programme by Hot Press magazine readers. The last show aired on 31 December 2008. Channel 6 was replaced by 3e on 1 January 2009.

Despite only airing for two years, the show helped launch many new Irish bands such as Director.

Programme producer Elton Mulally has produced televised coverage of the Choice Music Prize for RTÉ2.

== Under Ether ==
In autumn 2009, RTÉ Two commissioned a follow-up show called When Under Ether, hosted by Michelle Doherty and Nightshift producer Elton Mullally. The first series began airing on the 10th of November 2009. A second series, under the altered programme title of just "Under Ether", began broadcasting on the 6th of October 2010.
