= Patrick Hickey (soccer) =

American soccer player

Personal information
- Date of birth: July 2, 1998 (age 28)
- Place of birth: Des Plaines, United States
- Height: 1.98 m (6 ft 6 in)
- Positions: Utility player; defender; forward; midfielder

Team information
- Current team: Bohemians
- Number: 12

Youth career
- Illinois Wesleyan University

Senior career*
Years	Team	Apps	(Gls)
2021	CD Herbania		
2022	Villanueva CF		
2022–2023	Athlone Town	48	(4)
2024–2025	Galway United	63	(9)
2026–	Bohemians	35	(5)
- * Club domestic league appearances and goals as of 16:42, 9 November 2026 (UTC)

Patrick Hickey (born July 2, 1998) is an American professional soccer player who plays as a defender for League of Ireland Premier Division club Bohemians.

== Career ==
=== Early career ===
Hickey played 4 years of high school soccer at St. Viator located in Arlington Heights, IL. Hickey played College soccer for his University side Illinois Wesleyan University, before working in sales and spending 6 months out of the game until he decided to leave his job and move to Spain to start his football career, signing for Spanish 5th division side CD Herbania, and then division rivals Villanueva CF shortly afterwards.

=== Ireland ===
Having completed his studies in Spain, he moved to Ireland and signed with Athlone Town in the League of Ireland First Division, whilst studying further at the Athlone Institute of Technology. Hickey performed well during the 2023 season, racking up 37 appearances, with 2 goals and several assists

He signed for Galway United ahead of the 2024 season, having completed his studies at Athlone Institute of Technology. He was named League of Ireland Player of the Month for August 2024.

On November 22, 2025, it was announced that Hickey had signed for fellow League of Ireland Premier Division club Bohemians, on a multi-year contract. He was named League of Ireland Player of the Month for March 2026.

== Personal life ==
Hickey is in a relationship with American professional soccer player Madie Gibson, who plays as a winger in the League of Ireland Women's Premier Division. The pair arrived in Athlone during the same week in July 2022 as part of the American player influx facilitated by Athlone Town's partnership with Valeo FC, initially bonding as part of the overseas cohort living locally before starting a relationship. They share a friendly domestic rivalry; in autumn 2024, Hickey won the Men's Player of the Month award for August with Galway United before Gibson claimed the Women's Player of the Month award for September.
