= Jonathan Afolabi =

Irish footballer (born 2000)

Personal information
- Date of birth: 14 January 2000 (age 26)
- Place of birth: Dublin, Ireland
- Height: 1.89 m (6 ft 2 in)
- Position: Forward

Team information
- Current team: Shamrock Rovers
- Number: 18

Youth career
- Marks Celtic
- Shamrock Rovers
- Lourdes Celtic
- St Joseph's Boys
- 2016–2019: Southampton

Senior career*
Years	Team	Apps	(Gls)
2019–2022	Celtic	0	(0)
2020	→ Dunfermline Athletic (loan)	6	(2)
2020–2021	→ Dundee (loan)	19	(3)
2021–2022	→ Ayr United (loan)	14	(1)
2022	→ Airdrieonians (loan)	12	(2)
2022–2023	Bohemians	37	(15)
2024–2026	Kortrijk	15	(2)
2024–2025	→ Cambuur (loan)	15	(2)
2026–	Shamrock Rovers	9	(1)

International career
- Republic of Ireland U17
2017–2019	Republic of Ireland U19	16	(6)
2019–2021	Republic of Ireland U21	5	(1)
- * Club domestic league appearances and goals as of 17:23, 9 November 2026 (UTC)

Jonathan Afolabi (born 14 January 2000) is an Irish professional footballer who plays as a forward for League of Ireland Premier Division club Shamrock Rovers. His previous clubs include Celtic, Dunfermline Athletic, Dundee, Ayr United, Airdrieonians, Bohemians, Kortrijk and Cambuur.

== Club career ==
=== Early career ===
Born and raised in Tallaght, Dublin, Ireland, Afolabi played his youth football with Marks Celtic, Shamrock Rovers, Lourdes Celtic, and St Joseph's Boys before earning a move to the Academy of Premier League club Southampton.

=== Celtic ===
On 21 August 2019, Afolabi joined Scottish Premiership Champions Celtic.

After various loan spells, his contract was not renewed on expiry at the end of June 2022.

==== Dunfermline Athletic (loan) ====
On 27 January 2020, Afolabi signed for Dunfermline Athletic of the Scottish Championship on loan until the end of the season. His debut in senior football came on 1 February 2020, in a 3–2 win away to Queen of the South. He made six appearances for the club, scoring twice, before the season was ended prematurely due to the COVID-19 pandemic.

==== Dundee (loan) ====
On 29 September 2020, Afolabi joined Dundee on a season-long loan. He scored his first goal for the club at home in the league against Greenock Morton. He scored against Hearts and Ayr United in crucial games for Dundee as they won the promotion playoffs in the 2020–21 season.

==== Ayr United (loan) ====
On 2 August 2021, Afolabi signed for Ayr United on loan until the end of the season.

==== Airdrieonians (loan) ====
On 11 February 2022, Afolabi was recalled from Ayr and was immediately sent on loan to Scottish League One side Airdrieonians for the rest of the season.

=== Bohemians ===
On 5 August 2022, Afolabi returned home to Dublin, signing for League of Ireland Premier Division club Bohemians. Afolabi was awarded the League of Ireland Player of the Month award for July 2023, after scoring nine total goals over seven consecutive games. He finished the 2023 League of Ireland Premier Division season as the joint-top league goalscorer and was named in the PFAI Team of the Year. He opened the scoring in the 2023 FAI Cup final but the Bohs lost the game to St Patrick's Athletic.

=== Kortrijk ===
On 29 December 2023, it was announced that Afolabi would be joining Belgian Pro League side Kortrijk for an undisclosed fee, from 1 January 2024 on a contract until June 2026. Afolabi made his debut on 20 January 2024, coming on as a substitute in a league victory away to Standard Liège. Afolabi scored his first goal for De Kerels in a league draw away to Club Brugge. In July 2024, he was subject to a bid from Turkish Süper Lig side Sivasspor for a reported fee of €550,000, but the move didn't materialise in the end. After spending the 2024–25 season out on loan at Cambuur, he returned to the club for the 2025–26 season, but after making just 2 appearances that season it was announced on 9 May 2026 that he would be released by Kortrijk at the end of his contract.

==== Cambuur loan ====
On 2 September 2024, Afolabi signed for Eerste Divisie club Cambuur on a season long loan. In April 2025, Cambuur manager Henk de Jong confirmed that Afolabi would no longer play for the club due to being 'difficult'. On 9 May 2026, Kortrijk announced the departure of Afolabi at the end of the season.

=== Shamrock Rovers ===
On 4 July 2026, Afolabi returned to Ireland, signing a multi-year contract with Shamrock Rovers, where he had previously played in his academy days. On 14 July 2026 he made his debut for the club, replacing Graham Burke from the bench in a 5–1 win over Floriana in the UEFA Champions League. On 7 August 2026, he scored his first goal for the club, the winner in a 3–2 victory at home to Dundalk.

== International career ==
Afolabi was born in Dublin, Republic of Ireland. Afolabi has played for the Ireland right up to under-21 level. On 31 July 2019 he was named in the 2019 UEFA European Under-19 Championship Team of the Tournament, alongside Ferran Torres and Félix Correia in the forward positions. He scored his first goal for the Republic of Ireland U21s on 26 March 2021 in a 2–1 friendly win over Wales U21 in Wrexham.

On 8 September 2023, he received his first call up to the senior Republic of Ireland squad when he was included in the extended squad for the UEFA Euro 2024 qualifier at home to the Netherlands, but did not make the final squad.

== Career statistics ==
As of match played on 30 October 2026

Appearances and goals by club, season and competition
Club	Season	League			National cup (Note: Includes Scottish Cup, FAI Cup, Belgian Cup & KNVB Cup)		League cup (Note: Includes Scottish League Cup)		Europe		Other		Total	
Club	Season	Division	Apps	Goals	Apps	Goals	Apps	Goals	Apps	Goals	Apps	Goals	Apps	Goals
Southampton	2016–17	Premier League	0	0	0	0	0	0	0	0	1 (Note: Appearances for Southampton U21/U23 in the EFL Trophy)	0	1	0
Southampton	2017–18	Premier League	0	0	0	0	0	0	—		2	0	2	0
Southampton	2018–19	Premier League	0	0	0	0	0	0	—		2	0	2	0
Southampton	Total		0	0	0	0	0	0	0	0	5	0	5	0
Celtic	2019–20	Scottish Premiership	0	0	0	0	—		0	0	—		0	0
Celtic	2020–21	Scottish Premiership	0	0	—		—		0	0	—		0	0
Celtic	2021–22	Scottish Premiership	0	0	—		—		0	0	—		0	0
Celtic	Total		0	0	0	0	0	0	0	0	—		0	0
Dunfermline Athletic (loan)	2019–20	Scottish Championship	6	2	0	0	—		—		—		6	2
Dundee (loan)	2020–21	Scottish Championship	19	3	2	1	1	0	—		—		22	4
Ayr United (loan)	2021–22	Scottish Championship	14	1	1	0	1	0	—		0 (Note: Appearances in the Scottish Challenge Cup)	0	16	1
Airdrieonians (loan)	2021–22	Scottish League One	12	2	—		—		—		3 (Note: Appearances in the Scottish Championship play-offs)	1	15	3
Bohemians	2022	League of Ireland Premier Division	3	0	1	1	—		—		—		4	1
Bohemians	2023	League of Ireland Premier Division	34	15	5	5	—		—		1 (Note: Appearance in the Leinster Senior Cup)	0	40	20
Bohemians	Total		37	15	6	6	—		—		1	0	44	21
Kortrijk	2023–24	Belgian Pro League	13	1	—		—		—		0 (Note: Appearances in the 2023–24 Belgian Pro League Promotion/relegation play-offs)	0	13	1
Kortrijk	2024–25	Belgian Pro League	0	0	0	0	—		—		—		0	0
Kortrijk	2025–26	Challenger Pro League	2	1	0	0	—		—		—		2	1
Kortrijk	Total		15	2	0	0	—		—		0	0	15	2
Cambuur (loan)	2024–25	Eerste Divisie	14	2	0	0	—		—		0 (Note: Appearances in the 2024–25 Eerste Divisie Promotion/relegation play-offs)	0	14	2
Shamrock Rovers	2026	League of Ireland Premier Division	9	1	1	1	—		7 (Note: 3 appearances in the UEFA Champions League; 2 appearances in the UEFA Europa League; 2 appearances in the UEFA Conference League)	0	—		17	2
Career total			126	28	10	8	2	0	7	0	9	1	154	37

== Honours ==
Dundee

- Scottish Premiership play-offs: 2021

Bohemians

- Leinster Senior Cup: 2022–23

Individual

- UEFA European Under-19 Championship Team of the Tournament: 2019
- League of Ireland Premier Division Top Goalscorer: 2023 (15 goals)
- FAI Cup Top Scorer: 2023
- PFAI Team of the Year: 2023
- League of Ireland Player of the Month: July 2023
