= Cian Byrne (footballer) =

Irish footballer

Personal information
- Date of birth: 31 January 2003 (age 23)
- Place of birth: The Liberties, Dublin, Republic of Ireland
- Position: Defender

Team information
- Current team: Bohemians
- Number: 24

Youth career
- 2010–2016: Lourdes Celtic
- 2016–2018: St Kevin's Boys
- 2018: CK United
- 2018–2022: Bohemians

Senior career*
| Years | Team | Apps | (Gls) |
| 2022– | Bohemians | 60 | (2) |
| 2023 | → Longford Town (loan) | 20 | (0) |
| 2025 | → Galway United (loan) | 18 | (2) |
- * Club domestic league appearances and goals as of 17:58, 31 October 2026 (UTC)

Cian Byrne (born 31 January 2003) is an Irish professional footballer who plays as a defender for League of Ireland Premier Division club Bohemians. He has also previously spent time on loan at Longford Town and Galway United.

== Career ==
=== Youth career ===
Byrne was born and raised in James's Street in The Liberties, Dublin and began playing his schoolboy football with Lourdes Celtic, where he remained for 6 years before joining top Dublin Academy St Kevin's Boys, remaining there for 2 seasons, then played for League of Ireland underage Academy side CK United in 2018, before signing for Bohemians Academy in August of the same year. On 1 November 2022, he captained the club's under-19 side to the Enda McGuill Cup after beating St Patrick's Athletic in the final.

=== Bohemians ===
Byrne made his senior debut for Bohemians on 29 July 2022 in a 3–1 win away to Finn Harps in the First Round of the FAI Cup. He also featured in the next round of the cup against Lucan United, before making his league debut on 6 November 2022 in a 3–1 win over Sligo Rovers in the final game of the season. On 16 December 2022, he signed his first professional contract with the club on a multi-year contract.

==== Longford Town loan ====
On 23 February 2023, Byrne was loaned out to League of Ireland First Division club Longford Town to gain more first team experience. He made his debut for the club the following day in a 1–1 draw away to Waterford at the RSC. He made a total of 20 appearances for the club during his loan spell, before returning to Bohemians in July 2023.

==== Return from loan ====
Upon his return to Bohs, he featured in 4 league games, as well as 2 FAI Cup games in the run up to the Cup Final which he was in contention to start following the suspension of Kacper Radkowski in the Semi-final. On 18 September 2023, Byrne played in the final of the 2022–23 Leinster Senior Cup, as his side defeated Usher Celtic 5–0 at Dalymount Park to win the trophy. On 12 November 2023, he played the full 90 minute in the 2023 FAI Cup Final, as his side were defeated 3–1 by St Patrick's Athletic in front of a record FAI Cup final crowd at the Aviva Stadium. On 23 February 2024, Byrne was struck by a flare thrown onto the pitch towards him by his own supporters in a game away to St Patrick's Athletic, with the flare burning a hole through his jersey and burning his arm, despite this, his manager Declan Devine refused to criticise the supporters, stating that he "will not slag my own fans". Despite Devine being sacked 2 games later, Byrne remained an important figure for new manager Alan Reynolds, featuring a total of 29 times in all competitions as the side avoided relegation on 19 October 2024 with a 2–0 win away to Sligo Rovers to secure 8th place.

==== Galway United loan ====
On 18 February 2025, Byrne signed for fellow League of Ireland Premier Division club Galway United on loan until the end of June. He made his debut on 21 February 2025, replacing Moses Dyer from the bench in the 71st minute of a 2–1 win over St Patrick's Athletic at Eamonn Deacy Park. On 12 April 2025, he scored the first senior goals of his career in a 2–1 win away to Sligo Rovers at The Showgrounds, the first being a volley from open play and the second a free kick. He scored 2 goals in 18 appearances before being recalled from his loan spell by Bohemians at the end of June.

==== Return from Galway loan ====
On 22 November 2025, Byrne signed a new two-year-contract with Bohs having impressed upon his return from his loan spell with Galway.

== Career statistics ==
As of match played on 30 October 2026

Appearances and goals by club, season and competition
| Club | Season | League | | | National Cup (Note: Includes FAI Cup) | | Europe | | Other | | Total | |
| Club | Season | Division | Apps | Goals | Apps | Goals | Apps | Goals | Apps | Goals | Apps | Goals |
|---|---|---|---|---|---|---|---|---|---|---|---|---|
| Bohemians | 2022 | LOI Premier Division | 1 | 0 | 2 | 0 | – | | – | | 3 | 0 |
| Bohemians | 2023 | LOI Premier Division | 4 | 0 | 3 | 0 | – | | 3 (Note: Appearance(s) in the Leinster Senior Cup) | 0 | 10 | 0 |
| Bohemians | 2024 | LOI Premier Division | 26 | 0 | 3 | 0 | – | | 0 | 0 | 29 | 0 |
| Bohemians | 2025 | LOI Premier Division | 11 | 0 | 2 | 0 | – | | 1 | 0 | 14 | 0 |
| Bohemians | 2026 | LOI Premier Division | 18 | 2 | 3 | 0 | 5 (Note: Appearance(s) in the UEFA Conference League) | 0 | 1 | 0 | 27 | 2 |
| Bohemians | Total | | 60 | 2 | 13 | 0 | 5 | 0 | 5 | 0 | 83 | 2 |
| Longford Town (loan) | 2023 | LOI First Division | 20 | 0 | – | | – | | – | | 20 | 0 |
| Galway United (loan) | 2025 | LOI Premier Division | 18 | 2 | – | | – | | – | | 18 | 2 |
| Career Total | | | 98 | 4 | 13 | 0 | 5 | 0 | 5 | 0 | 121 | 4 |

== Honours ==
Bohemians

- Leinster Senior Cup: 2022–23
