= Luke Dennison =

American soccer player (born 1996)

Personal information
- Date of birth: August 21, 1996 (age 30)
- Place of birth: San Francisco, California, United States
- Position: Goalkeeper

Team information
- Current team: Drogheda United
- Number: 1

Youth career
- –2014: San Jose Earthquakes

College career
Years	Team	Apps	(Gls)
2014–2018	Chico State Wildcats		

Senior career*
Years	Team	Apps	(Gls)
2018	San Francisco Glens	0	(0)
2019–2022	Longford Town	30	(0)
2021	→ Galway United (loan)	4	(0)
2023–2024	Bohemians	0	(0)
2024–	Drogheda United	69	(0)
- * Club domestic league appearances and goals as of 17:28, 10 November 2026 (UTC)

Luke Dennison (born August 21, 1996) is an American professional soccer player who plays as a goalkeeper for League of Ireland First Division club Drogheda United.

== Early life ==
Dennison was born on August 21, 1996 in Pinole, California, United States. The son of Irish parents Paul Dennison and Fiona Convery, he attended Pinole Valley High School in the United States the California State University, Chico in the United States, where he studied public relations and marketing.

== Club career ==
Dennison started his career with American side San Francisco Glens in 2018 and trialed with Irish side Shamrock Rovers in 2019. The same year, he signed for Irish side Longford Town, but did not make a league appearance as the club achieved promotion from the League of Ireland First Division to the League of Ireland Premier Division. In 2021, he signed for First Division side Galway United on loan before returning to Longford Town in 2022. Ahead of the 2023 season, he signed for Premier Division side Bohemians. Subsequently, he signed for fellow Premier Division side Drogheda United in 2024, helping the club win the 2024 FAI Cup. On 16 September 2025, Dennison signed a new two-year-contract with the club to the end of the 2027 season. He made 27 appearances in all competitions in 2026, as the club was relegated following a defeat to UCD in the Promotion/Relegation Playoff.

== Career statistics ==
As of match played on 18 September 2026

Appearances and goals by club, season and competition
Club	Season	League			National Cup (Note: Includes FAI Cup)		Other		Total	
Club	Season	Division	Apps	Goals	Apps	Goals	Apps	Goals	Apps	Goals
San Francisco Glens	2018	USL League Two	0	0	–		–		0	0
Longford Town	2019	LOI First Division	0	0	–		–		0	0
Longford Town	2020	LOI First Division	0	0	1	0	0	0	1	0
Longford Town	2021	LOI Premier Division	0	0	–		–		0	0
Longford Town	2022	LOI First Division	30	0	1	0	–		31	0
Longford Town	Total		30	0	2	0	–		32	0
Galway United (loan)	2021	LOI First Division	4	0	0	0	0	0	4	0
Bohemians	2023	LOI Premier Division	0	0	0	0	2 (Note: Appearance(s) in the Leinster Senior Cup)	0	2	0
Bohemians	2024	LOI Premier Division	0	0	–		0	0	0	0
Bohemians	Total		0	0	0	0	2	0	2	0
Drogheda United	2024	LOI Premier Division	12	0	5	0	1 (Note: Appearance in the 2024 League of Ireland Promotion/Relegation Playoff)	0	18	0
Drogheda United	2025	LOI Premier Division	35	0	3	0	3 (Note: 1 appearance in the President of Ireland's Cup; 2 appearances in the Leinster Senior Cup)	0	41	0
Drogheda United	2026	LOI Premier Division	22	0	3	0	2	0	27	0
Drogheda United	Total		69	0	11	0	6	0	86	0
Career Total			103	0	13	0	8	0	124	0

== Honors ==
=== Club ===
Bohemians

- Leinster Senior Cup: 2022–23

Drogheda United

- FAI Cup: 2024

=== Individual ===
- PFAI Premier Division Team of the Year: 2025
