= 2023 Bohemian F.C. season =

Irish football club season

Bohemian F.C.
2023 season
- Manager: Declan Devine
- Stadium: Dalymount Park, Phibsborough, Dublin 7
- Premier Division: 6th
- FAI Cup: Runners-up
- Leinster Senior Cup: Winners
- Top goalscorer: League: Jonathan Afolabi (15 goals); All: Jonathan Afolabi (20 goals)
- Highest home attendance: 4,443 vs Dundalk League, Feb 24th
- Lowest home attendance: 2,746 vs Rockmount FAI Cup, Aug 18th
- Biggest win: 6-0 vs Rockmount (H) FAI Cup, Aug 18th
- Biggest defeat: 3-0 vs Shamrock Rovers (A) League, September 1st
Home colours	Away colours	Third colours

The 2023 League of Ireland season was Bohemian Football Club's 133rd year in their history and their 39th consecutive season in the League of Ireland Premier Division since it became the top tier of Irish football. Bohemians participated in the FAI Cup, where they reached the final for the second time in three years but lost out to fellow Dublin club St. Patrick's Athletic in front of a record 43,881 fans. In September, the club won the Leinster Senior Cup for a record 33rd time.

Bohs saw their membership increase from 1,000 members to 2,400 for the 2023 season, an all-time high. They also unveiled the new Mono Stand, an homage to the late legendary club volunteer Derek Monaghan. Thus, the capacity of Dalymount Park was increased to above 4,400.

== Club ==
=== Kits ===
Supplier: O'Neills | Sponsor: Des Kelly Interiors

==== Home ====
Bohemians home kit for the 2023 season features a tribute to the late club legend Derek 'Mono' Monaghan as well as a return to the club's traditional red and black stripes. The new kit is inspired by the Auld Triangle, the famous song about the eponymous metal triangle housed in Mountjoy Prison, which is located in the vicinity of Dalymount Park.

==== Away ====
Releasing their away jersey, Bohs teamed up with Palestine Sport for Life to raise awareness of human rights violations in Palestine. The new away kit will also raise funds to support access to sports for children in the camp of Tulkarem in the West Bank. Ten per cent of the profits from the jersey will provide sports equipment for the project in Tulkarem. The jersey carries the Palestinian colours and a dove icon below the collar, which symbolises peace.

The previous season's Bob Marley shirt was in use as an alternate jersey in pre-season and throughout their Leinster Senior Cup campaign.

==== Third ====
Bohs retained their Dublin Bus kit from the previous season as an alternate strip. As before, 10% of all sales are donated to Dublin Bus’ charity partner LGBT Ireland and Bohemians’ partners at ShoutOut.

=== Management team ===
Position	Name
Manager	(Northern Ireland) Declan Devine
Assistant manager	(Republic of Ireland) Gary Cronin
Assistant coach	(Republic of Ireland) Derek Pender
Academy coach	(Republic of Ireland) Trevor Croly
Goalkeeping coach	(Scotland) Chris Bennion
Strength and conditioning coach	(Republic of Ireland) Graham Norton
Lead physiotherapist	(Republic of Ireland) Sinead Wixted
Director of football	(Republic of Ireland) Pat Fenlon
Head of recruitment	(Republic of Ireland) Dave Henderson
Club doctor	(Republic of Ireland) Dr Paul Kirwan
Equipment manager	(Republic of Ireland) Colin O Connor
Assistant equipment manager	(Republic of Ireland) Aaron Fitzsimons

== Transfers ==
=== Transfers in ===
Date	Pos.	Player	From	Fee	Source
Winter
January 2023	GK	(United States) Luke Dennison	(Republic of Ireland) Longford Town	Free	
January 2023	DF	(Republic of Ireland) Paddy Kirk	(Republic of Ireland) Sligo Rovers	Free	
January 2023	MF	(Republic of Ireland) Adam McDonnell	(Republic of Ireland) Sligo Rovers	Free	
January 2023	MF	(Republic of Ireland) Dylan Connolly	(England) Morecambe	Free	
January 2023	MF	(Republic of Ireland) Keith Buckley	(Australia) Blacktown Spartans	Free	
January 2023	FW	(England) James Akintunde	(Republic of Ireland) Derry City	Free	
January 2023	FW	(Republic of Ireland) Dean Williams	(Republic of Ireland) Drogheda United	Free	
February 2023	DF	(Poland) Krystian Nowak	(Romania) Universitatea Cluj	Free	
Summer
July 2023	DF	(Republic of Ireland) Cian Byrne	(Republic of Ireland) Longford Town	Loan end	
July 2023	DF	(Poland) Bartlomiej Kukulowicz	(Poland) Bruk-Bet Termalica Nieciecza	Free	
July 2023	MF	(Republic of Ireland) Danny Grant	(England) Huddersfield Town	Free	

=== Loan in ===
Date	Pos.	Player	From	Fee	Source
Winter
January 2023	DF	(England) Grant Horton	(England) Cheltenham Town	Loan	
February 2023	DF	(England) Jay Benn	(England) Lincoln City	Loan	
February 2023	DF	(Poland) Kacper Radkowski	(Poland) Śląsk Wrocław	Loan	
February 2023	DF	(England) Drew Baker	(England) Fleetwood Town	Loan	
Summer
July 2023	DF	(England) Louie Holzman	(England) Reading	Loan	

=== Transfers out ===
Date	Pos.	Player	To	Fee	Source
Winter
January 2023	GK	(Republic of Ireland) Tadgh Ryan	(Republic of Ireland) Derry City	Free	
January 2023	GK	(Scotland) Jon McCracken	(England) Norwich City	Loan end	
January 2023	DF	(Republic of Ireland) Tyreke Wilson	(Republic of Ireland) Shelbourne	Free	
January 2023	DF	(Republic of Ireland) Rory Feely	(England) Barrow	Free	
January 2023	DF	(Republic of Ireland) Ciaran Kelly	(England) Bradford	Free	
January 2023	DF	(Republic of Ireland) Max Murphy	(Republic of Ireland) Bray Wanderers	Free	
January 2023	DF	(Republic of Ireland) James Finnerty	(Republic of Ireland) Sligo Rovers	Free	
January 2023	MF	(Republic of Ireland) Jordan Doherty	(United States) Tampa Bay Rowdies	Free	
January 2023	MF	(Scotland) Liam Burt	(Republic of Ireland) Shamrock Rovers	Free	
January 2023	MF	(Republic of Ireland) Conor Levington	(Republic of Ireland) Wexford	Free	
January 2023	MF	(Republic of Ireland) Jamie Mullins	(England) Brighton and Hove Albion	Free	
January 2023	MF	(Republic of Ireland) Aaron Doran	(Republic of Ireland) Wexford	Free	
January 2023	MF	(Germany) Laurenz Dehl	(Germany) Union Berlin	Loan end	
January 2023	FW	(England) Junior Ogedi-Uzokwe	(Northern Ireland) Glentoran	Free	
February 2023	DF	(Scotland) Josh Kerr	(Scotland) Cove Rangers	Released	
February 2023	DF	(Republic of Ireland) Ryan Burke	(Republic of Ireland) Waterford	Released	
Summer
July 2023	DF	(England) Jay Benn	(England) Lincoln City	Loan end	
July 2023	DF	(England) Drew Baker	(Republic of Ireland) Waterford	Loan end	
July 2023	DF	(England) Grant Horton	(England) Cheltenham Town	Loan end	
August 2023	DF	(Republic of Ireland) Derin Adewale	(Italy) Lecce	Undisclosed	
September 2023	MF	(Republic of Ireland) Danny McGrath	(Belgium) Lommel	Undisclosed	

=== Loan out ===
Date	Pos.	Player	From	Fee	Source
Winter
January 2023	FW	(Republic of Ireland) Ethon Varian	(Republic of Ireland) Cork City	Loan	
February 2023	DF	(Republic of Ireland) Cian Byrne	(Republic of Ireland) Longford Town	Loan	

== First Team Squad ==
No.	Player	Nat.	Pos.	Date of birth (age)	Since	Ends	Last club
Goalkeepers
1	James Talbot	(Republic of Ireland)	GK	24 April 1997 (age 29)	2019	2024	(England) Sunderland
25	Luke Dennison	(United States)	GK	21 August 1996 (age 29)	2023	2023	(Republic of Ireland) Longford Town
30	Joe Collins	(Republic of Ireland)	GK	25 February 2007 (age 19)	2023	2023	(Republic of Ireland) Bohemians U19
Defenders
2	Bartlomiej Kukulowicz	(Poland)	RB	11 October 2000 (age 25)	2023	2023	(Poland) Bruk-Bet Termalica Nieciecza
3	Paddy Kirk	(Republic of Ireland)	LB	2 June 1998 (age 27)	2023	2024	(Republic of Ireland) Sligo Rovers
4	Krystian Nowak	(Poland)	CB	1 April 1994 (age 32)	2023	2023	(Romania) Universitatea Cluj
5	Louie Holzman	(England)	CB	16 November 2003 (age 22)	2023	2023	(England) Reading
13	Kacper Radkowski	(Poland)	CB	27 March 2001 (age 25)	2023	2023	(Poland) Śląsk Wrocław
24	Cian Byrne	(Republic of Ireland)	CB	31 January 2003 (age 23)	2023	2023	(Republic of Ireland) Longford Town
Midfielders
6	Jordan Flores	(England)	CM	4 October 1995 (age 30)	2022	2024	(England) Northampton Town
7	Declan McDaid	(Scotland)	LM	22 November 1995 (age 30)	2022	2023	(Scotland) Dundee
8	Ali Coote	(Scotland)	AM	11 June 1998 (age 27)	2021	2023	(Republic of Ireland) Waterford
10	Dylan Connolly	(Republic of Ireland)	RM	2 May 1995 (age 31)	2023	2025	(England) Morecambe
12	Danny Grant	(Republic of Ireland)	RW	23 December 2000 (age 25)	2023	2024	(England) Huddersfield Town
14	James McManus	(Republic of Ireland)	CM	16 March 2005 (age 21)	2022	2025	(Republic of Ireland) Bohemians U19
15	James Clarke	(Republic of Ireland)	AM	28 January 2001 (age 25)	2022	2024	(Republic of Ireland) Drogheda United
16	Keith Buckley (C)	(Republic of Ireland)	CM	17 June 1992 (age 33)	2023	2026	(Australia) Blacktown Spartans
17	Adam McDonnell	(Republic of Ireland)	CM	14 May 1997 (age 29)	2023	2025	(Republic of Ireland) Sligo Rovers
18	John O'Sullivan	(Republic of Ireland)	AM	18 September 1993 (age 32)	2022	2023	(England) Accrington Stanley
23	Kris Twardek	(Canada)	RM	8 March 1997 (age 29)	2022	2024	(Slovenia) FK Senica
Forwards
9	Jonathan Afolabi	(Republic of Ireland)	CF	14 January 2000 (age 26)	2022	2023	(Scotland) Celtic
11	James Akintunde	(England)	CF	29 March 1996 (age 30)	2022	2024	(Republic of Ireland) Derry City
22	Dean Williams	(Republic of Ireland)	CF	9 February 2000 (age 26)	2023	2024	(Republic of Ireland) Drogheda United
28	Chris Lotefa	(Republic of Ireland)	CF	8 August 2004 (age 21)	2022	2023	(Republic of Ireland) Bohemians U19
29	Nickson Okosun	(Republic of Ireland)	CF	26 November 2006 (age 19)	2022	2023	(Republic of Ireland) Bohemians U19

Last updated: 31 August 2023.
Source: Competitions

== Friendlies ==
=== Pre-season ===
15 January 2023 Friendly	Bohemians	2–1	Galway United	Cloughran, Dublin
15:15 GMT	Afolabi 38'; Williams 76' (pen.)		Manning 53'	Stadium: AUL Complex; Referee: Oliver Moran

21 January 2023 Friendly	Bohemians	3–1	Shelbourne	Cloughran, Dublin
11:00 GMT	Williams 17' (pen.); Coote 61'; McDonnell 72'		J Wilson 68'	Stadium: AUL Complex; Referee: David Dunne

21 January 2023 Friendly	Bohemians	3–1	St Patrick's Athletic	Cloughran, Dublin
14:30 GMT	Akintunde 23', 36'; Afolabi 24'		Lonergan 55'	Stadium: AUL Complex; Referee: Gavin Colfer

10 February 2023 Friendly	Wexford	1-2	Bohemians	Wexford
18:30GMT	Dobbs 41'		Coote 35'; Flores 81'	Stadium: Ferrycarrig Park; Referee: Gavin Colfer

11 February 2023 Friendly	Bohemians	1-0	Longford Town	Cloughran, Dublin
12:00GMT	Gilmore 57'			Stadium: AUL Complex; Referee: David Dunne

=== Mid-season ===
19 June 2023 Friendly	Bohemians (Republic of Ireland)	4-4	(Wales) The New Saints	Phibsborough
12:00GMT	Okosun 4' 21' 83' (pen.); Clarke 39'	Report	Smith 10'; McManus 51' (pen.); Davies 69'; Williams 72'	Stadium: Dalymount Park; Referee: David Gibbons

== Competitions ==
=== League of Ireland ===
==== League table ====
Pos	Team	Pld	W	D	L	GF	GA	GD	Pts	Qualification or relegation
1	Shamrock Rovers (C)	36	20	12	4	67	27	+40	72	Qualification for Champions League first qualifying round
2	Derry City	36	18	11	7	57	24	+33	65	Qualification for Conference League first qualifying round
3	St Patrick's Athletic	36	19	5	12	59	42	+17	62	Qualification for Conference League second qualifying round (Note: The 2023 FAI Cup winners qualified for the Conference League second qualifying round. Since the cup winners (St Patrick's Athletic) qualified based on league position, the second Conference League first qualifying round spot was passed to the fourth-placed team.)
4	Shelbourne	36	15	15	6	44	27	+17	60	Qualification for Conference League first qualifying round
5	Dundalk	36	17	7	12	59	44	+15	58	
6	Bohemians	36	16	10	10	53	40	+13	58	
7	Drogheda United	36	10	11	15	40	54	−14	41	
8	Sligo Rovers	36	10	7	19	36	51	−15	37	
9	Cork City (R)	36	8	7	21	35	64	−29	31	Qualification for play-off final
10	UCD (R)	36	2	5	29	19	96	−77	11	Relegation to League of Ireland First Division

Source: SSE Airtricity League,
Rules for classification: 1) Points; 2) Goal difference; 3) Goals scored.
(C) Champions; (R) Relegated

==== Results summary ====
Overall								Home						Away					
Pld	W	D	L	GF	GA	GD	Pts	W	D	L	GF	GA	GD	W	D	L	GF	GA	GD
36	16	10	10	53	40	+13	58	10	4	4	37	21	+16	6	6	6	16	19	−3

==== Results by match day ====
Matchday	1	2	3	4	5	6	7	8	9	10	11	12	13	14	15	16	17	18	19	20	21	22	23	24	25	26	27	28	29	30	31	32	33	34	35	36
Ground	A	H	A	H	A	H	A	H	A	H	A	A	H	A	H	A	H	H	A	A	H	A	H	A	H	H	A	H	A	A	H	H	A	L	A	H
Result	W	W	L	W	W	W	W	L	W	L	W	D	W	L	L	D	D	W	L	D	D	L	W	D	W	W	D	D	L	D	D	W	W	L	L	W
Position	1	1	2	2	1	1	1	1	1	1	1	1	1	1	3	3	3	3	4	4	4	5	5	4	4	3	3	4	4	5	5	4	4	4	6	6

A = Away; H = Home; W = Win; D = Draw; L = Loss

==== Matches ====
Win Draw Loss

17 February 2023 1	Cork City	1–2	Bohemians	Cork
19:45 GMT	Keating 83'	Report	Horton 20'; Flores 54'	Stadium: Turners Cross; Attendance: 6,487; Referee: Rob Hennessy
Note: Game shown live on RTE2.

24 February 2023 2	Bohemians	2–1	Dundalk	Phibsborough
19:45	Flores 45'; McDaid 71'	Report	Yli-Kokko 89'	Stadium: Dalymount Park; Attendance: 4,443; Referee: Rob Harvey

3 March 2023 3	Shelbourne	1–0	Bohemians	Drumcondra
19:45	Leavy 78'	Report	Connolly (red card) 67'	Stadium: Tolka Park; Attendance: 4,250; Referee: Arnold Hunter

6 March 2023 4	Bohemians	3–1	Drogheda United	Phibsborough
19:45	Flores 9'; Coote 38'; Akintunde 51'	Report	Draper 11'	Stadium: Dalymount Park; Attendance: 4,114; Referee: Ray Matthews

10 March 2023 5	St Patrick's Athletic	0–2	Bohemians	Inchicore
19:45	Lennon (yellow card) 51' (yellow-red card) 78'	Report	Afolabi 18'; Williams 90+3'	Stadium: Richmond Park; Attendance: 5,002; Referee: Neil Doyle

17 March 2023 6	Bohemians	2–1	UCD	Phibsborough
19:45	Kirk 55'; Coote 57'	Report	Kinsella-Bishop 12'	Stadium: Dalymount Park; Attendance: 4,017; Referee: Rob Harvey

1 April 2023 7	Sligo Rovers	0–1	Bohemians	Sligo
19:45		Report	Nowak 83'	Stadium: The Showgrounds; Attendance: 3,651; Referee: Rob Hennessy

7 April 2023 8	Bohemians	0-2	Shamrock Rovers	Phibsborough
19:45		Report	Farrugia 43'; Gaffney 66'	Stadium: Dalymount Park; Attendance: 4,290; Referee: Rob Harvey
Note: Game shown live on Virgin Media Two.

10 April 2023 9	Derry City	0–1	Bohemians	Derry
19:00		Report	Williams 66' (pen.)	Stadium: Ryan McBride Brandywell Stadium; Attendance: 3,600; Referee: Neil Doyle

14 April 2023 10	Bohemians	2–3	St Patrick's Athletic	Phibsborough
19:45 GMT	McDonnell 15'; Flores (red card) 45'; Williams 65'	Report	Forrester 20'; McClelland 24'; Doyle 31'; Lonergan (red card) 90+3'	Stadium: Dalymount Park; Attendance: 4,428; Referee: Paul McLaughlin

21 April 2023 11	Drogheda United	0-2	Bohemians	Drogheda
19:45		Report	Kirk 17'; McDaid 90+5'	Stadium: Weavers Park; Attendance: 2175; Referee: Sean Grant

28 April 2023 12	UCD	1-1	Bohemians	Belfield
19:45	Doyle 88'	Report	Afolabi 53'	Stadium: Belfield Bowl; Attendance: 1567; Referee: Kevin O’ Sullivan

1 May 2023 13	Bohemians	5-0	Cork City	Phibsborough
17:00	Flores 32'; McDonnell 56'; Coote 78' 79'; McManus 84'	Report	Gilchrist (red card) 30'	Stadium: Dalymount Park; Attendance: 4,145; Referee: Adriano Reale

5 May 2023 14	Shamrock Rovers	2-0	Bohemians	Tallaght
19:45	Clarke 57'; Gaffney 81'	Report		Stadium: Tallaght Stadium; Attendance: 7864; Referee: Rob Hennessy

12 May 2023 15	Bohemians	0-1	Derry City	Phibsborough
19:45	Horton (red card) 14'	Report	Graydon 17'	Stadium: Dalymount Park; Attendance: 4293; Referee: Paul McLaughlin

19 May 2023 16	Dundalk	2-2	Bohemians	Dundalk
19:45	Hoban 4'; Talbot 30' (OG)	Report	McDaid 78'; Nowak 88'	Stadium: Oriel Park; Attendance: 2473; Referee: Neil Doyle

26 May 2023 17	Bohemians	0-0	Shelbourne	Phibsborough
19:45		Report		Stadium: Dalymount Park; Attendance: 4381; Referee: Damien MacGraith

2 June 2023 18	Bohemians	2-0	Sligo Rovers	Phibsborough
19:45	Clarke 32'; McDaid 68'	Report		Stadium: Dalymount Park; Attendance: 4134; Referee: Eoghan O'Shea

5 June 2023 19	Cork City	2-1	Bohemians	Cork
19:45	Healy 73'; Krezic 88'	Report	McDonnell 87'	Stadium: Turners Cross; Attendance: 3891; Referee: Rob Harvey

9 June 2023 20	Derry City	0-0	Bohemians	Derry
19:45		Report		Stadium: Ryan McBride Brandywell Stadium; Attendance: 3274; Referee: Damien MacGraith

23 June 2023 21	Bohemians	2-2	Shamrock Rovers	Phibsborough
19:45	Afolabi 67'; Clarke 73'	Report	Farrugia 48'; Poom 54'	Stadium: Dalymount Park; Attendance: 4370; Referee: Neil Doyle
Note: Game shown live on RTE2

30 June 2023 22	Sligo Rovers	3-1	Bohemians	Sligo
19:45	Barlow 26'; Mata 42'; Radosaljlevic 57'	Report	Afolabi 87'	Stadium: The Showgrounds; Attendance: 2108; Referee: David Dunne

7 July 2023 23	Bohemians	3-2	Dundalk	Phibsborough
19:45	McManus 15'; O'Sullivan 82'; Afolabi 85'	Report	Yli-Kokko 24'; Malley 37'	Stadium: Dalymount Park; Attendance: 4328; Referee: Rob Hennessy

14 July 2023 24	Shelbourne	1-1	Bohemians	Drumcondra
19:45	Moylan 56'	Report	Afolabi 80'	Stadium: Tolka Park; Attendance: 4450; Referee: Neil Doyle

28 July 2023 25	Bohemians	2-0	UCD	Phibsborough
19:45	Afolabi 75' (pen.) 89'	Report		Stadium: Dalymount Park; Attendance: 4142; Referee: Kevin O’Sullivan

4 August 2023 26	Bohemians	4-2	Drogheda United	Phibsborough
19:45	Radkowski 2'; Afolabi 45', 77' (pen.); Clarke 85'	Report	Weir 36' (red card) 39'; Egan 75'	Stadium: Dalymount Park; Attendance: 4322; Referee: Rob Hennessy

11 August 2023 27	St Patrick's Athletic	0-0	Bohemians	Inchicore
19:45		Report		Stadium: Richmond Park; Attendance: 5011; Referee: Rob Harvey
Note: Game shown live on RTE 2

25 August 2023 28	Bohemians	2-2	Derry City	Phibsborough
19:45	Clarke 13'; Afolabi 53' (pen.)	Report	Duffy 22'; Mullen 42'	Stadium: Dalymount Park; Attendance: 4142; Referee: Rob Harvey
Note: Kick off delayed until 20:30 due to flood light failure following lightning strikes

1 September 2023 29	Shamrock Rovers	3-0	Bohemians	Tallaght
19:45	Grace 43'; Finn 51'; Farrugia 82'	Report		Stadium: Tallaght Stadium; Attendance: 7816; Referee: Rob Hennessy

22 September 2023 30	Drogheda United	0-0	Bohemians	Drogheda
19:45		Report		Stadium: Weavers Park; Attendance: 1951; Referee: Paul McLaughlin

25 September 2023 31	Bohemians	1-1	Shelbourne	Phibsborough
19:45	Coote 74'	Report	Moylan 23'	Stadium: Dalymount Park; Attendance: 4390; Referee: Rob Harvey
Note: Fixture moved from 15 September due to Bohemians involvement in FAI Cup

29 September 2023 32	Bohemians	3-1	Sligo Rovers	Phibsborough
19:45	Afolabi 56' 85'; Coote 73'	Report	Martelo 90+3' (pen.)	Stadium: Dalymount Park; Attendance: 4193; Referee: Kevin O'Sullivan

12 October 2023 33	UCD	1-2	Bohemians	Belfield
19:45	Alonge 89'	Report	Clarke 46'; Grant 66'	Stadium: Belfield Bowl; Attendance: 1224; Referee: David Dunne

20 October 2023 34	Bohemians	0-2	St Patrick's Athletic	Phibsborough
19:45		Report	Mark Doyle 59'; Conor Carty 82'	Stadium: Dalymount Park; Attendance: 4084; Referee: Damien MacGraith.

27 October 2023 Round 35	Dundalk	2–0	Bohemians	Oriel Park
19:45	Doyle 78'; Kelly 90'	Report		Attendance: 3,000; Referee: Rob Hennessy

3 November 2023 36	Bohemians	4-0	Cork City	Phibsborough
19:45	Grant 12'; Afolabi 45' 57'; Bailey 51' (o.g.)	Report		Stadium: Dalymount Park; Attendance: 4083; Referee: Neil Doyle

=== FAI Cup ===
21 July 2023 Round 1	Bohemians	1-0	Shelbourne	Phibsborough
19:45	Afolabi 32'	Report		Stadium: Dalymount Park; Attendance: 4168; Referee: Paul McLaughlin

18 August 2023 Round 2	Bohemians	6-0	Rockmount	Phibsborough
19:45	Clarke 18' 45+1'; Afolabi 23'; McDaid 55'; Twardek 66'; McDonnell 85'	Report		Stadium: Dalymount Park; Attendance: 2746; Referee: David Dunne

15 September 2023 1/4 Final	Drogheda United	1-3	Bohemians	Drogheda
19:45	Brennan 50' (pen.)	Report	Nowak 44'; Afolabi 56' 90' (pen.)	Stadium: Weavers Park; Attendance: 2344; Referee: Damien MacGraith

8 October 2023 Semi Final	Galway United	0-1	Bohemians	Galway
14:40		Report	Connolly 45'; Radkowski (red card) 59'	Stadium: Eamonn Deacy Park; Attendance: 4300; Referee: Neil Doyle
Note: Game shown live on RTE 1

12 November 2023 Final	Bohemians	1–3	St Patrick's Athletic	Dublin
15:00	Afolabi 9' (pen.)	Report	Doyle 23'; Nowak 48' (o.g.); Lonergan 87'	Stadium: Aviva Stadium; Attendance: 43,881; Referee: Paul McLaughlin
Note: Live on RTÉ Two

=== Leinster Senior Cup ===
29 January 2023 Round 4	North End United	1-5	Bohemians	Wexford
14:00 GMT	Rhodes 30'		Flores 10'; Williams 59', 78'; Burke 84'; Horton 89'	Stadium: Hollygrove; Attendance: 400; Referee: Gavin Colfer

12 March 2023 1/4 final	Crumlin United	0-1 (a.e.t.)	Bohemians	Phibsborough
14:00			O'Sullivan 101'	Stadium: Dalymount Park; Attendance: 1032; Referee: Adriano Reale

3 July 2023 Semi final	Shelbourne	3-4	Bohemians	Drumcondra
19:45	Robinson 33' 69'; Farrell 79' (pen.)		Jinadu 24'; O'Reilly 25'; Mooney 52'; Grogan 87'	Stadium: Tolka Park; Attendance: 2109; Referee: Alan Patchell

18 September 2023 Final	Bohemians	5-0	Usher Celtic	Phibsborough
19:45	Mc Cormack 8'; McDaid 39'; Twardek 53'; Lotefa 64'; Coote 66'			Stadium: Dalymount Park; Attendance: 3093; Referee: Paul Norton

=== Overview ===
Competition	Record							
Competition	P	W	D	L	GF	GA	GD	Win %
Premier Division	36	16	10	10	53	40	+13	44.44
FAI Cup	5	4	0	1	12	4	+8	80.00
Leinster Senior Cup (Winners)	4	4	0	0	15	4	+11	100.00
Total	45	24	10	11	80	48	+32	53.33

Updated to match played 12 November 2023
Source: Competitions

== Statistics ==
=== Appearances and goals ===
No.	Pos.	Player	Premier Division		FAI Cup		Leinster Senior Cup		Total	
No.	Pos.	Player	Apps	Goals	Apps	Goals	Apps	Goals	Apps	Goals
1	GK	(Republic of Ireland) James Talbot	36	0	5	0	1	0	42	0
2	DF	(Poland) Bartlomiej Kukulowicz	9(3)	0	3	0	1	0	13(3)	0
3	DF	(Republic of Ireland) Paddy Kirk	30(2)	2	4(1)	0	0	0	34(3)	2
4	CB	(Poland) Krystian Nowak	31(2)	2	5	1	0	0	36(2)	3
5	DF	(England) Louie Holzman	0	0	1(1)	0	1	0	2(1)	0
6	MF	(Republic of Ireland) Jordan Flores	30(3)	4	4	0	1	0	35(3)	5
7	MF	(Scotland) Declan McDaid	30(19)	4	4(4)	1	2(1)	1	36(24)	6
8	MF	(Scotland) Ali Coote	30(9)	6	3(2)	0	2	1	35(11)	7
9	FW	(Republic of Ireland) Jonathan Afolabi	34(2)	15	5	5	1	0	40(2)	20
10	MF	(Republic of Ireland) Dylan Connolly	28(3)	0	4	1	1	0	33(3)	1
11	FW	(England) James Akintunde	19(9)	1	2	0	2	0	23(10)	1
12	MF	(Republic of Ireland) Danny Grant	12(5)	2	4(1)	0	0	0	16(6)	2
13	DF	(Poland) Kacper Radkowski	34	1	4	0	0	0	38	1
14	DF	(Republic of Ireland) James McManus	23(10)	2	4	0	2(1)	0	29(11)	2
15	MF	(Republic of Ireland) James Clarke	32(10)	5	5	2	2	0	39(10)	7
16	MF	(Republic of Ireland) Keith Buckley	27(1)	0	3	0	1	0	31(1)	0
17	MF	(Republic of Ireland) Adam McDonnell	32(2)	3	5(2)	1	1	0	38(4)	4
18	MF	(Republic of Ireland) John O'Sullivan	19(17)	1	5(5)	0	2	1	26(22)	2
20	MF	(Republic of Ireland) Billy Gilmore	0	0	0	0	3	0	3	0
21	DF	(Republic of Ireland) Finn Cowper Gray	0	0	0	0	2	0	2	0
22	FW	(Republic of Ireland) Dean Williams	16(11)	3	0	0	2(2)	2	18(13)	5
23	MF	(Canada) Kris Twardek	19(10)	0	2(2)	1	3	1	24(12)	2
24	DF	(Republic of Ireland) Cian Byrne	4(1)	0	3(2)	0	3	0	10(3)	0
25	GK	(United States) Luke Dennison	0	0	0	0	2	0	2	0
27	MF	(Republic of Ireland) Alex O'Brien	0	0	0	0	1	0	1	0
28	FW	(Republic of Ireland) Chris Lotefa	1(1)	0	0	0	3(2)	1	4(3)	1
29	FW	(Republic of Ireland) Nickson Okosun	2(2)	0	0	0	2(1)	0	4(3)	0
30	GK	(Republic of Ireland) Joe Collins	0	0	0	0	1	0	1	0
31	DF	(Republic of Ireland) Luca Cailloce	0	0	0	0	1	0	1	0
32	MF	(Republic of Ireland) Tobi Jinadu	0	0	0	0	1	1	1	1
33	MF	(Republic of Ireland) Jack O'Reilly	0	0	0	0	3(1)	1	3(1)	1
34	DF	(Republic of Ireland) Ruadhan Kane	0	0	0	0	1	0	1	0
35	FW	(Republic of Ireland) Taylor Mooney	0	0	0	0	2(1)	1	2(1)	1
36	FW	(Republic of Ireland) Peter Grogan	0	0	0	0	1(1)	1	1(1)	1
37	DF	(Republic of Ireland) Ian Byrne	0	0	0	0	0	0	1(1)	0
38	DF	(Republic of Ireland) Jake McCormack	0	0	0	0	1	1	1	1
99	GK	(Republic of Ireland) Andrew Stuart Trainor	0	0	0	0	0	0	0	0
-	DF	(England) Grant Horton	20(4)	1	0	0	1	1	21(4)	2
-	DF	(England) Drew Baker	1(1)	0	0	0	1	0	2(1)	0
-	DF	(England) Jay Benn	8(1)	0	0	0	1	0	9(1)	0
-	DF	(Republic of Ireland) Ryan Burke	0	0	0	0	1(1)	1	1(1)	1
-	DF	(Republic of Ireland) Derin Adewale	0	0	0	0	2	0	2	0
-	MF	(Republic of Ireland) Danny McGrath	0	0	0	0	1(1)	0	1(1)	0

Player(s) in italics left during season

=== Top Scorers ===
No.	Player	Premier Division	FAI Cup	Leinster Senior Cup	Total
9	(Republic of Ireland) Jonathan Afolabi	15	5	0	20
8	(Scotland) Ali Coote	6	0	1	7
15	(Republic of Ireland) James Clarke	5	2	0	7
7	(Scotland) Declan McDaid	4	1	1	6
6	(England) Jordan Flores	4	0	1	5
22	(Republic of Ireland) Dean Williams	3	0	2	5
17	(Republic of Ireland) Adam McDonnell	3	1	0	4
4	(Poland) Krystian Nowak	2	1	0	3
3	(Republic of Ireland) Paddy Kirk	2	0	0	2
-	(England) Grant Horton	1	0	1	2
14	(Republic of Ireland) James McManus	2	0	0	2
12	(Republic of Ireland) Danny Grant	2	0	0	2
18	(Republic of Ireland) John O' Sullivan	1	0	1	2
23	(Canada) Kris Twardek	0	1	1	2
11	(England) James Akintunde	1	0	0	1
13	(Poland) Kacper Radkowski	1	0	0	1
10	(Republic of Ireland) Dylan Connolly	0	1	0	1
32	(Republic of Ireland) Tobi Jinadu	0	0	1	1
12	(Republic of Ireland) Jack O'Reilly	0	0	1	1
35	(Republic of Ireland) Taylor Mooney	0	0	1	1
36	(Republic of Ireland) Peter Grogan	0	0	1	1
28	(Republic of Ireland) Chris Lotefa	0	0	1	1
38	(Republic of Ireland) Jake McCormack	0	0	1	1
-	(Republic of Ireland) Ryan Burke	0	0	1	1
-	Own Goal	1	0	0	1
Total		53	12	15	80

Player(s) in italics left during season

=== Clean Sheets ===
No.	Player	Premier Division	FAI Cup	Leinster Senior Cup	Total
1	(Republic of Ireland) James Talbot	12/36	3/5	0/1	15/42
25	(United States) Luke Dennison	0/0	0/0	2/2	2/2
30	(Republic of Ireland) Joe Collins	0/0	0/0	0/1	0/1
99	(Republic of Ireland) Andrew Stuart Trainor	0/0	0/0	0/0	0/0
Total		12/36	3/5	2/4	17/45

=== Discipline ===
No.	Pos.	Player	Premier Division			FAI Cup			Leinster Senior Cup			Total		
No.	Pos.	Player	Booked	(yellow card) (yellow-red card)	Sent off (straight red)	Booked	(yellow card) (yellow-red card)	Sent off (straight red)	Booked	(yellow card) (yellow-red card)	Sent off (straight red)	Booked	(yellow card) (yellow-red card)	Sent off (straight red)
1	GK	(Republic of Ireland) James Talbot	2	0	0	1	0	0	0	0	0	3	0	0
2	DF	(Poland) Bartlomiej Kukulowicz	1	0	0	2	0	0	0	0	0	3	0	0
3	DF	(Republic of Ireland) Paddy Kirk	6	0	0	0	0	0	0	0	0	6	0	0
4	DF	(Poland) Krystian Nowak	1	0	0	0	0	0	0	0	0	1	0	0
5	DF	(England) Louie Holzman	0	0	0	0	0	0	0	0	0	0	0	0
6	MF	(England) Jordan Flores	5	0	1	0	0	0	0	0	0	5	0	1
7	MF	(Scotland) Declan McDaid	1	0	0	1	0	0	0	0	0	2	0	0
8	MF	(Scotland) Ali Coote	3	0	0	1	0	0	0	0	0	4	0	0
9	FW	(Republic of Ireland) Jonathan Afolabi	3	0	0	1	0	0	0	0	0	4	0	0
10	MF	(Republic of Ireland) Dylan Connolly	7	0	1	0	0	0	0	0	0	7	0	1
11	FW	(England) James Akintunde	2	0	0	0	0	0	0	0	0	2	0	0
12	DF	(Republic of Ireland) Danny Grant	0	0	0	0	0	0	0	0	0	0	0	0
13	DF	(Poland) Kacper Radkowski	5	0	0	0	1	0	0	0	0	5	1	0
14	MF	(Republic of Ireland) James McManus	4	0	0	1	0	0	0	0	0	5	0	0
15	MF	(Republic of Ireland) James Clarke	4	0	0	2	0	0	0	0	0	6	0	0
16	MF	(Republic of Ireland) Keith Buckley	9	0	0	2	0	0	0	0	0	11	0	0
17	MF	(Republic of Ireland) Adam McDonnell	12	0	0	1	0	0	0	0	0	13	0	0
18	MF	(Republic of Ireland) John O'Sullivan	2	0	0	0	0	0	0	0	0	2	0	0
20	MF	(Republic of Ireland) Billy Gilmore	0	0	0	0	0	0	0	0	0	0	0	0
21	DF	(Republic of Ireland) Finn Cowper Gray	0	0	0	0	0	0	1	0	0	1	0	0
22	MF	(Republic of Ireland) Dean Williams	1	0	0	0	0	0	0	0	0	1	0	0
23	MF	(Canada) Kris Twardek	0	0	0	0	0	0	0	0	0	0	0	0
24	DF	(Republic of Ireland) Cian Byrne	0	0	0	0	0	0	0	0	0	0	0	0
25	GK	(United States) Luke Dennison	0	0	0	0	0	0	1	0	0	1	0	0
27	MF	(Republic of Ireland) Alex O'Brien	0	0	0	0	0	0	0	0	0	0	0	0
28	FW	(Republic of Ireland) Chris Lotefa	0	0	0	0	0	0	0	0	0	0	0	0
29	FW	(Republic of Ireland) Nickson Okosun	0	0	0	0	0	0	1	0	0	1	0	0
30	GK	(Republic of Ireland) Joe Collins	0	0	0	0	0	0	0	0	0	0	0	0
31	DF	(Republic of Ireland) Luca Cailloce	0	0	0	0	0	0	0	0	0	0	0	0
32	MF	(Republic of Ireland) Tobi Jinadu	0	0	0	0	0	0	0	0	0	0	0	0
33	MF	(Republic of Ireland) Jack O'Reilly	0	0	0	0	0	0	1	0	0	1	0	0
34	DF	(Republic of Ireland) Ruadhan Kane	0	0	0	0	0	0	0	0	0	0	0	0
35	FW	(Republic of Ireland) Taylor Mooney	0	0	0	0	0	0	0	0	0	0	0	0
36	FW	(Republic of Ireland) Peter Grogan	0	0	0	0	0	0	1	0	0	1	0	0
37	DF	(Republic of Ireland) Ian Byrne	0	0	0	0	0	0	0	0	0	0	0	0
38	DF	(Republic of Ireland) Jake McCormack	0	0	0	0	0	0	0	0	0	0	0	0
99	GK	(Republic of Ireland) Andrew Stuart Trainor	0	0	0	0	0	0	0	0	0	0	0	0
-	DF	(England) Grant Horton	2	0	1	0	0	0	0	0	0	2	0	1
-	DF	(England) Drew Baker	0	0	0	0	0	0	1	0	0	1	0	0
-	DF	(England) Jay Benn	2	0	0	0	0	0	0	0	0	2	0	0
-	DF	(Republic of Ireland) Ryan Burke	0	0	0	0	0	0	0	0	0	0	0	0
-	DF	(Republic of Ireland) Derin Adewale	0	0	0	0	0	0	0	0	0	0	0	0
-	MF	(Republic of Ireland) Danny McGrath	0	0	0	0	0	0	0	0	0	0	0	0
Total			72	0	3	12	1	0	6	0	0	91	1	3

Player(s) in italics left during season

=== Captains ===
No.	Pos.	Player	No. Games	Notes
16	MF	(Republic of Ireland) Keith Buckley	30	Captain
6	MF	(England) Jordan Flores	6	Vice-Captain
17	MF	(Republic of Ireland) Adam McDonnell	5	
18	MF	(Republic of Ireland) John O'Sullivan	1	
14	MF	(Republic of Ireland) James McManus	1	
24	DF	(Republic of Ireland) Cian Byrne	1	

Last updated: 27 October 2023.
Source: Competitions

== International call-ups ==
=== Republic of Ireland National Team ===
Player	Fixture	Date	Location	Event
Jonathan Afolabi	vs. Netherlands	10 September 2023	Dublin, Ireland	UEFA 2024 European Championship qualification

=== Republic of Ireland Under 19 National Team ===
Player	Fixture	Date	Location	Event
James McManus	vs. Slovakia	22 March 2023	Wexford, Ireland	2023 UEFA European Under-19 Championship qualification
James McManus	vs. Estonia	22 March 2023	Wexford, Ireland	2023 UEFA European Under-19 Championship qualification
James McManus	vs. Greece	28 March 2023	Wexford, Ireland	2023 UEFA European Under-19 Championship qualification
James McManus	vs. Bosnia and Herzegovina	7 September 2023	Trebinje, Bosnia and Herzegovina	Friendly
James McManus	vs. Scotland	11 October 2023	Pinatar, Spain	Friendly
James McManus	vs. Faroe Islands	14 October 2023	Pinatar, Spain	Friendly
James McManus	vs. Albania	15 November 2023	Elbasan, Albania	2024 UEFA European Under-19 Championship qualification
James McManus	vs. Slovenia	18 November 2023	Rrogozhinë, Albania	2024 UEFA European Under-19 Championship qualification
James McManus	vs. Belgium	21 November 2023	Rrogozhinë, Albania	2024 UEFA European Under-19 Championship qualification

=== Republic of Ireland Under 18 National Team ===
Player	Fixture	Date	Location	Event
Nickson Okosun	vs. Belgium	16 November 2023	Valencia, Spain	Friendly
Nickson Okosun	vs. Belgium	18 November 2023	Valencia, Spain	Friendly
Taylor Mooney	vs. Belgium	16 November 2023	Valencia, Spain	Friendly
Taylor Mooney	vs. Belgium	18 November 2023	Valencia, Spain	Friendly

=== Republic of Ireland Under 17 National Team ===
Player	Fixture	Date	Location	Event
Nickson Okusun	vs. Hungary	9 February 2023	Pinatar, Spain	Friendly
Nickson Okusun	vs. Hungary	11 February 2023	Pinatar, Spain	Friendly
Nickson Okusun	vs. Italy	7 March 2023	Paphos, Cyprus	2023 UEFA European Under-17 Championship qualification
Nickson Okusun	vs. Ukraine	10 March 2023	Paphos, Cyprus	2023 UEFA European Under-17 Championship qualification
Nickson Okusun	vs. Cyprus	13 March 2023	Paphos, Cyprus	2023 UEFA European Under-17 Championship qualification
Nickson Okusun	vs. Poland	17 May 2023	Budapest, Hungary	2023 UEFA European Under-17 Championship
Nickson Okusun	vs. Wales	20 May 2023	Budapest, Hungary	2023 UEFA European Under-17 Championship
Nickson Okusun	vs. Hungary	23 May 2023	Budapest, Hungary	2023 UEFA European Under-17 Championship
Nickson Okusun	vs. Spain	27 May 2023	Budapest, Hungary	2023 UEFA European Under-17 Championship
Danny McGrath	vs. Hungary	9 February 2023	Pinatar, Spain	Friendly
Danny McGrath	vs. Hungary	11 February 2023	Pinatar, Spain	Friendly
Danny McGrath	vs. Italy	7 March 2023	Paphos, Cyprus	2023 UEFA European Under-17 Championship qualification
Danny McGrath	vs. Ukraine	10 March 2023	Paphos, Cyprus	2023 UEFA European Under-17 Championship qualification
Danny McGrath	vs. Cyprus	13 March 2023	Paphos, Cyprus	2023 UEFA European Under-17 Championship qualification
Danny McGrath	vs. Poland	17 May 2023	Budapest, Hungary	2023 UEFA European Under-17 Championship
Danny McGrath	vs. Wales	20 May 2023	Budapest, Hungary	2023 UEFA European Under-17 Championship
Danny McGrath	vs. Hungary	23 May 2023	Budapest, Hungary	2023 UEFA European Under-17 Championship
Danny McGrath	vs. Spain	27 May 2023	Budapest, Hungary	2023 UEFA European Under-17 Championship
Joe Collins	vs. Belgium	9 September 2023	Tubize, Belgium	Friendly
Joe Collins	vs. Belgium	11 September 2023	Tubize, Belgium	Friendly
Joe Collins	vs. Armenia	11 October 2023	Fermoy, Ireland	2024 UEFA European Under-17 Championship qualification
Joe Collins	vs. Iceland	14 October 2023	Cork, Ireland	2024 UEFA European Under-17 Championship qualification
Joe Collins	vs. Switzerland	17 October 2023	Cork, Ireland	2024 UEFA European Under-17 Championship qualification
Luca Cailloce	vs. Belgium	9 September 2023	Tubize, Belgium	Friendly
Luca Cailloce	vs. Belgium	11 September 2023	Tubize, Belgium	Friendly
Luca Cailloce	vs. Armenia	11 October 2023	Fermoy, Ireland	2024 UEFA European Under-17 Championship qualification
Luca Cailloce	vs. Iceland	14 October 2023	Cork, Ireland	2024 UEFA European Under-17 Championship qualification
Luca Cailloce	vs. Switzerland	17 October 2023	Cork, Ireland	2024 UEFA European Under-17 Championship qualification

=== Republic of Ireland Under 16 National Team ===
Player	Fixture	Date	Location	Event
Luca Caillcoe	vs. Switzerland	15 February 2023	Oliva, Spain	Friendly
Luca Caillcoe	vs. Latvia	17 February 2023	Oliva, Spain	Friendly
Luca Caillcoe	vs. Switzerland	10 May 2023	Dunajská Streda, Slovakia	UEFA Development Tournament
Luca Caillcoe	vs. Ukraine	12 May 2023	Dunajská Streda, Slovakia	UEFA Development Tournament
Luca Caillcoe	vs. Slovakia	15 May 2023	Dunajská Streda, Slovakia	UEFA Development Tournament

== Awards ==
Player	Award
Ali Coote	League Of Ireland Player of the Month March
Jonathan Afolabi	League Of Ireland Player of the Month July
Jonathan Afolabi	League of Ireland Golden Boot Award
Jonathan Afolabi	PFAI Team of the Year
James Clarke	League Of Ireland Player of the Month August
James Clarke	Bohemian FC Player Of The Year
James Clarke	PFAI Team of the Year
James McManus	Bohemian FC Young Player Of The Year
