= Ali Coote =

Scottish footballer

Personal information
- Full name: Alistair Michael Coote
- Date of birth: 11 June 1998 (age 28)
- Place of birth: Bedford, England
- Height: 1.72 m (5 ft 8 in)
- Position: Midfielder

Team information
- Current team: Shelbourne
- Number: 14

Youth career
- Tayport Thistle
- –2014: Dundee United

Senior career*
Years	Team	Apps	(Gls)
2014–2017	Dundee United	13	(0)
2016	→ East Fife (loan)	6	(2)
2017–2020	Brentford B	0	(0)
2020	Waterford	17	(3)
2021–2023	Bohemians	92	(12)
2024	Detroit City	9	(1)
2024–	Shelbourne	75	(8)

International career
2012–2013	Scotland U15	8	(0)
2013–2014	Scotland U16	5	(3)
2014–2015	Scotland U17	5	(0)
- * Club domestic league appearances and goals as of 19:36, 10 November 2026 (UTC)

Alistair Michael Coote (born 11 June 1998) is a Scottish professional footballer who plays as a midfielder for League of Ireland Premier Division club Shelbourne.

Coote began his career with Dundee United and made his first team debut in 2015, before joining Brentford B in 2017. After failing to break into the first team squad, he moved to the League of Ireland in 2020 and played for Waterford, Bohemians and Shelbourne. He also briefly played in the United States for Detroit City and represented Scotland at U15, U16 and U17 level.

== Early life ==
Coote was born in Bedford, England and grew up in Newport-on-Tay, Fife, Scotland. He attended St John's Roman Catholic High School in Dundee. While playing for Bohemians, he shared a house in Dunboyne with Liam Burt, Stephen Mallon and Georgie Kelly.

== Club career ==
=== Dundee United ===
A box-to-box midfielder, Coote began his youth career with Tayport Thistle, before moving to the academy at Dundee United. By late 2013, his performances saw him named by STV as one of 14 youth players to make an impact in 2014. Coote signed his first professional contract in June 2014 and won his maiden call into the first team squad for a Scottish Premiership match versus Celtic on 21 December 2014. He remained an unused substitute during the 2–1 victory. Coote broke into the matchday squad on a regular basis in the final two months of the 2014–15 season and made his professional debut as a substitute for Calum Butcher after 76 minutes of a 1–0 defeat to Aberdeen on 18 April 2015. He finished the 2014–15 season with three appearances.

Despite appearing regularly for the Development Squad, Coote won only three calls into the first team squad during the 2015–16 season and spent much of the second half of the season away on loan at Scottish League Two club East Fife. After returning from the loan, he made his sole appearance of the season as a second-half substitute in a 3–2 victory over Inverness Caledonian Thistle on 6 May 2016. With SPFL rules stating that a player returning from loan after 31 March is not eligible to play for his parent club during the same season, the rule breach led to Dundee United being deducted three points and fined £30,000.

Dundee United's relegation to the Scottish Championship at the end of the 2015–16 season saw Coote promoted into the first team squad for 2016–17 and he was a regular inclusion on the substitutes' bench throughout the campaign. He made his first start for the club in the 2017 Scottish Challenge Cup Final versus St Mirren and won the first senior trophy of his career in the 2–1 victory. His season ended with defeat in the Scottish Premiership play-offs to Hamilton Academical. Coote made 16 appearances during the 2016–17 season and departed the club in June 2017. He made 20 appearances and scored no goals during three seasons as a professional at Tannadice Park.

=== Brentford B ===
On 22 June 2017, Coote moved to England to join the B team at Championship club Brentford on a three-year contract for an undisclosed fee. He made 33 appearances and scored 9 goals during the 2017–18 season. Coote had a successful 2018–19 season, winning the team's Player of the Year award and the Middlesex Senior Cup. After loanee Nikolaj Kirk departed the club in March 2019, Coote took over the B team captaincy. During the 2019–20 pre-season, Coote was included in the first team squad for its training camp in Austria. He was frozen out of the B team during the first half of the 2019–20 season and departed Brentford in January 2020. He made 79 appearances and scored 19 goals in three seasons for the B team, but failed to receive a call into a first team matchday squad.

=== Waterford ===
On 24 January 2020, Coote transferred to League of Ireland Premier Division club Waterford on permanent contract. He made 18 appearances and scored three goals during the COVID-19-affected 2020 season and departed the club at the end of the campaign.

=== Bohemians ===
On 24 December 2020, it was announced that Coote had transferred to League of Ireland Premier Division club Bohemians. He immediately became a starter for the team and was named the League of Ireland Player of the Month for August 2021, during which he scored three goals in four appearances, which included a brace in a 2–1 UEFA Europa Conference League third qualifying round first leg victory over PAOK. The following month, Coote signed a one-year contract extension and he finished the 2021 season with 41 appearances and seven goals. Coote made 32 appearances and scored two goals during a mid-table 2022 season, in which he was demoted to the U19 team, but he won his place back under new manager Declan Devine. During the 2023 season, Coote was part of the Leinster Senior Cup-winning squad and scored in the 5–0 Final victory over Usher Athletic. He was released when his contract expired and ended his three seasons with the club on 108 appearances and 15 goals.

=== Detroit City ===
On 9 January 2024, Coote transferred to USL Championship club Detroit City and signed a two-year contract. He made 11 appearances and scored one goal prior to his departure on 18 June 2024.

=== Shelbourne ===
On 18 June 2024, Coote transferred to League of Ireland Premier Division club Shelbourne and signed a contract effective 1 July 2024. He ended the League of Ireland Premier Division championship-winning 2024 season with 20 appearances and one goal. Coote signed a new one-year contract in November 2024. He made 44 appearances and scored seven goals during the 2025 season, in which the club won the President of Ireland's Cup. Coote signed a new two-year contract in October 2025.

== International career ==
Coote made his international debut for Scotland at U15 level and won the first of his eight caps in an U15 tournament match versus Italy on 20 March 2012. He won five caps for the U16 team during the 2013–14 season and made appearances in both the 2013 Valerie Ivanov Tournament (scoring his first international goal) and the 2014 Aegean Cup. Coote experienced success in the 2013–14 Victory Shield, scoring his first international brace (versus Northern Ireland) and playing the full 90 minutes of the 1–0 victory in the final versus England. He won five U17 caps during the 2014–15 season and was called into the squad for the 2015 European U17 Championship finals, but was withdrawn from the tournament at the request of Dundee United.

== Career statistics ==
As of match played 16 October 2026

Appearances and goals by club, season and competition
Club	Season	League			National cup (Note: Includes Scottish Cup, FAI Cup, U.S. Open Cup)		League cup (Note: Includes Scottish League Cup)		Europe		Other		Total	
Club	Season	Division	Apps	Goals	Apps	Goals	Apps	Goals	Apps	Goals	Apps	Goals	Apps	Goals
Dundee United	2014–15	Scottish Premiership	3	0	0	0	0	0	—		—		3	0
Dundee United	2015–16	Scottish Premiership	1	0	0	0	0	0	—		—		1	0
Dundee United	2016–17	Scottish Championship	9	0	0	0	1	0	—		6 (Note: 4 appearances in Scottish Challenge Cup, 2 appearances in Scottish Premiership play-offs)	0	16	0
Dundee United	Total		13	0	0	0	1	0	—		6	0	20	0
East Fife (loan)	2015–16	Scottish League Two	6	2	—		—		—		—		6	2
Waterford	2020	LOI Premier Division	17	3	1	0	—		—		—		18	3
Bohemians	2021	LOI Premier Division	32	4	3	1	—		6 (Note: Appearance(s) in Conference League)	2	—		41	7
Bohemians	2022	LOI Premier Division	30	2	2	0	—		—		—		32	2
Bohemians	2023	LOI Premier Division	30	6	3	0	—		—		2 (Note: Appearances in Leinster Senior Cup)	1	35	6
Bohemians	Total		92	12	8	1	—		6	2	2	1	108	15
Detroit City	2024	USL Championship	9	1	2	0	—		—		—		11	1
Shelbourne	2024	LOI Premier Division	13	1	3	0	—		4	0	—		20	1
Shelbourne	2025	LOI Premier Division	32	5	1	0	—		10 (Note: 4 appearances and 1 goal in UEFA Champions League; 1 appearance in UEFA Europa League; 5 appearances, 1 goal in UEFA Conference League)	2	1 (Note: Appearance in President of Ireland's Cup)	0	44	7
Shelbourne	2026	LOI Premier Division	30	2	1	0	—		3	1	0	0	34	3
Shelbourne	Total		75	8	5	0	—		17	3	1	0	98	11
Career total			212	26	16	1	1	0	23	5	9	1	260	32

== Honours ==
Dundee United

- Scottish Challenge Cup: 2016–17

Brentford B

- Middlesex Senior Cup: 2018–19

Bohemians

- Leinster Senior Cup: 2022–23

Shelbourne

- League of Ireland Premier Division: 2024
- President of Ireland's Cup: 2025

Scotland U16

- Victory Shield: 2013–14

Individual

- Brentford B Mary Halder Award: 2018–19
- League of Ireland Player of the Month: August 2021, March 2023
