= Declan McDaid =

Scottish footballer

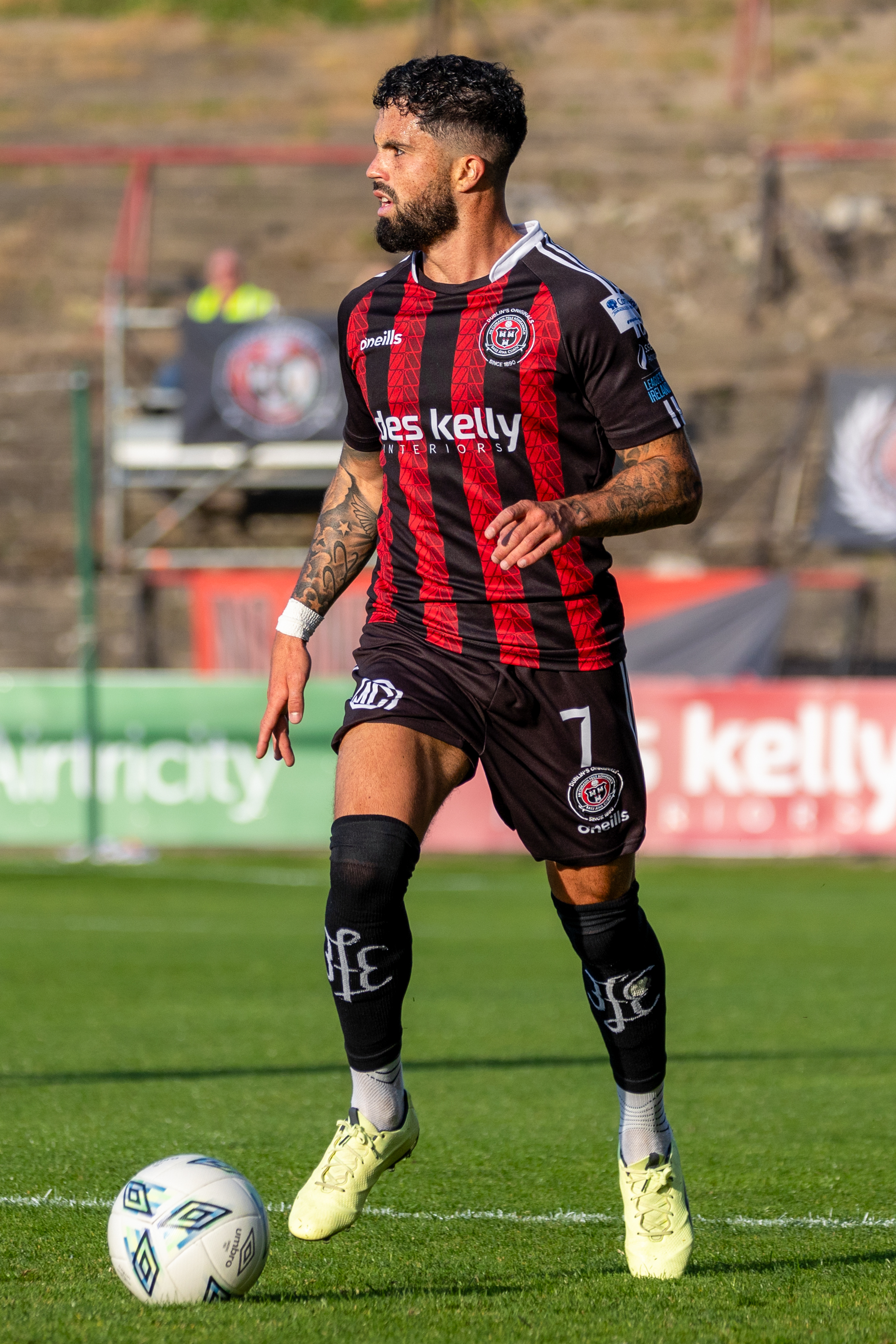

Personal information
- Date of birth: 22 November 1995 (age 30)
- Place of birth: Dunoon, Scotland
- Height: 5 ft 9 in (1.75 m)
- Position: Winger

Team information
- Current team: Dundalk
- Number: 27

Youth career
- 2011–2012: Greenock Morton

Senior career*
Years	Team	Apps	(Gls)
2012–2013	Greenock Morton	1	(0)
2013–2017	Partick Thistle	23	(0)
2016	→ Cowdenbeath (loan)	17	(1)
2017–2019	Ayr United	75	(10)
2019–2022	Dundee	51	(4)
2021	→ Falkirk (loan)	9	(0)
2022–2024	Bohemians	72	(7)
2025	Athlone Town	10	(1)
2025–	Dundalk	48	(6)

International career^{‡}
2013	Scotland Schools U18	4	(1)
- * Club domestic league appearances and goals as of 17:22, 10 November 2026 (UTC) ‡ National team caps and goals as of 15:00, 23 July 2018 (UTC)

Declan McDaid (born 22 November 1995) is a Scottish footballer who plays as a midfielder for League of Ireland Premier Division club Dundalk. McDaid started his career as a youth player at Greenock Morton, before being promoted to the club's first team in April 2013. However, McDaid left the club a short time later and signed for then Scottish First Division side Partick Thistle in June 2013. After two successful seasons with Ayr United, he signed for Scottish Championship side Dundee in June 2019 and enjoyed promotion to the Scottish Premiership with them in 2021. He also played for Falkirk on loan before spending two and a half seasons with Irish club Bohemians, and then a brief stint with Athlone Town.

== Club career ==
=== Greenock Morton ===
Whilst still in school, Morton received a £35,000 verbal offer from Celtic but rejected it to allow him to complete his schooling.

Born in Dunoon, McDaid made his debut across the River Clyde for Greenock Morton's first-team on 6 April 2013, coming on as a late substitute in a 5–2 victory over Airdrie United. He chose to reject an offer of a full-time contract with the club and left in 2013.

=== Partick Thistle ===
McDaid joined newly promoted Scottish Premiership club Partick Thistle on 21 June 2013, initially to play for Thistle's under 20 squad. Just 20 seconds after coming on as a substitute against St Mirren, McDaid assisted Christie Elliott for a goal in the seventy-fifth minute. Thistle eventually won the game 1–0. On 18 February 2015, McDaid signed a new contract, keeping him at Partick Thistle until the summer of 2017. However, McDaid left Thistle on 31 January 2017, after the club agreed to terminate his contract.

==== Cowdenbeath (loan) ====
In January 2016, McDaid moved to Scottish League One side Cowdenbeath on loan, with the purpose of gaining some first-team experience. McDaid scored his first ever professional goal on 20 February 2016 scoring for Cowdenbeath in a 3–2 home defeat to Peterhead making it 1–1 at the time.

=== Ayr United ===
After leaving Partick Thistle, McDaid signed a short-term deal with Scottish League One side Ayr United on 31 January 2017. He scored his first goal for Ayr in a Scottish Cup round of 16 replay with Clyde in February 2017. With Ayr, McDaid would win League One in the 2017–18 season, and would follow that up with an impressive season in the Scottish Championship, finishing 4th place and qualifying for the Scottish Premiership playoffs, though were unsuccessful in their attempts at consecutive promotions.

=== Dundee ===
McDaid signed a two-year deal with Dundee in June 2019, which would later be extended to three years. He opened his scoring account for the Dark Blues by scoring both goals in a 2–0 win over Arbroath, and followed that up a couple weeks later with a long-range goal and Man of the Match performance against his former side Ayr United.

On 29 January, McDaid was announced to be returning to former club Partick Thistle, now in League One, on loan in January 2021 until the end of the season. However, due to teams in the third tier and lower being unable to play due to COVID-19 restrictions in Scotland, he was unable to play for the Jags, and would play for Dundee again in February. The club would confirm in March that McDaid would stay with the club for the remainder of the season. McDaid's form would pick up, and he would be a part of the Dundee side which won the Premiership play-offs and gained promotion to the Scottish Premiership.

==== Falkirk (loan) ====
In September 2021, McDaid joined Scottish League One side Falkirk on loan until January 2022. He would return to Dens in January after making 9 appearances with the Bairns and would return to playing games for Dundee under new manager Mark McGhee.

McDaid would leave Dundee following the end of his contract in May 2022.

=== Bohemians ===
In July 2022, McDaid signed for League of Ireland Premier Division club Bohemians. He was on the score sheet in the club's victory in the final of the 2023 Leinster Senior Cup. On 2 November 2024, Bohemians announced that McDaid would leave the club after two and a half seasons at Dalymount Park.

=== Athlone Town ===
On 5 January 2025, McDaid signed for League of Ireland First Division club Athlone Town. On 14 March 2025, McDaid scored his first goal for Athlone in a home league win over UCD. After making 12 appearances in all competitions for the club, it was announced on 22 May 2025 that he had been released along with 4 of his teammates in the wake of a failed takeover of the club by investors.

=== Dundalk ===
On 1 July 2025, McDaid signed for League of Ireland First Division club Dundalk. He made his debut 3 days later in an away league win against Kerry. On 4 August, McDaid scored his first goal for the Lilywhites in a league win over Longford Town. On 19 December 2025, McDaid signed a new contract with the club for 2026, after helping them to promotion by winning the 2025 League of Ireland First Division title. On 30 July 2026, McDaid signed a new contract until the end of the 2027 season.

== International career ==
McDaid was first called into the Scotland Schools U18 squad in 2013 after his performances in the Morton reserve side which finished second in the SFL Reserve League.

McDaid would start all four games in the Centenary Cup, and scored against England at McDiarmid Park.

== Career statistics ==
As of match played 23 October 2026

Appearances and goals by club, season and competition
Club	Season	League			National Cup		League Cup		Other		Total	
Club	Season	Division	Apps	Goals	Apps	Goals	Apps	Goals	Apps	Goals	Apps	Goals
Greenock Morton	2012–13	Scottish First Division	1	0	0	0	0	0	0	0	1	0
Partick Thistle	2014–15	Scottish Premiership	16	0	0	0	0	0	—		16	0
Partick Thistle	2015–16	Scottish Premiership	4	0	0	0	1	0	—		5	0
Partick Thistle	2016–17	Scottish Premiership	3	0	0	0	2	0	—		5	0
Partick Thistle	Total		23	0	0	0	3	0	—		26	0
Cowdenbeath (loan)	2015–16	Scottish League One	17	1	0	0	0	0	2 (Note: Appearances in the League One play-offs)	0	19	1
Ayr United	2016–17	Scottish Championship	7	0	2	1	0	0	0	0	9	1
Ayr United	2017–18	Scottish League One	34	6	3	4	5	3	1 (Note: Appearance in the Scottish Challenge Cup)	0	43	13
Ayr United	2018–19	Scottish Championship	34	4	2	0	6	0	3 (Note: One appearance in the Scottish Challenge Cup; Two appearances in the Scottish Premiership play-offs)	0	45	4
Ayr United	Total		75	10	7	5	11	3	4	0	97	18
Dundee	2019–20	Scottish Championship	24	3	1	0	5	0	1	0	31	3
Dundee	2020–21	Scottish Championship	20	1	1	0	4	0	3 (Note: Appearances in the Premiership play-offs)	0	28	1
Dundee	2021–22	Scottish Premiership	7	0	1	0	3	0	—		11	0
Dundee	Total		51	4	3	0	12	0	4	0	70	4
Falkirk (loan)	2021–22	Scottish League One	9	0	0	0	—		0	0	9	0
Bohemians	2022	LOI Premier Division	15	2	3	1	—		—		18	3
Bohemians	2023	LOI Premier Division	31	4	4	1	—		2 (Note: Appearance(s) in the Leinster Senior Cup)	1	37	6
Bohemians	2024	LOI Premier Division	26	1	2	0	—		0	0	28	1
Bohemians	Total		72	7	9	2	—		2	1	83	10
Athlone Town	2025	LOI First Division	10	1	—		—		2	0	12	1
Dundalk	2025	LOI First Division	14	2	1	0	—		—		15	2
Dundalk	2026	LOI Premier Division	34	4	3	0	—		2	2	39	6
Dundalk	Total		48	6	4	0	—		2	2	54	8
Career total			306	29	23	7	26	3	16	3	370	42

== Honours ==
Bohemians

- Leinster Senior Cup: 2022–23

Dundalk

- League of Ireland First Division: 2025
