= Krystian Nowak =

Polish footballer (born 1994)

Personal information
- Full name: Krystian Nowak
- Date of birth: 1 April 1994 (age 32)
- Place of birth: Ełk, Poland
- Height: 1.88 m (6 ft 2 in)
- Position: Centre-back

Youth career
- Mazur Ełk
- 2007–2010: UKS SMS Łódź

Senior career*
Years	Team	Apps	(Gls)
2010–2011	UKS SMS Łódź	21	(1)
2011–2012	→ Tur Turek (loan)	18	(0)
2012–2013	→ Widzew Łódź (loan)	4	(1)
2013–2015	Widzew Łódź	74	(4)
2015–2016	Podbeskidzie Bielsko-Biała	21	(0)
2016–2018	Heart of Midlothian	20	(1)
2018	Panionios	0	(0)
2018–2020	Slaven Belupo	34	(3)
2020–2022	Widzew Łódź	51	(2)
2022–2023	Universitatea Cluj	0	(0)
2023	Bohemians	31	(1)
2024–2025	Zhenis	32	(0)
2025–2026	Andijon	14	(0)

International career
2009	Poland U15	2	(0)
2010	Poland U17	3	(0)
2013	Poland U19	1	(0)
2013–2014	Poland U20	5	(1)
2015	Poland U21	2	(0)
- * Club domestic league appearances and goals as of 22:55, 15 December 2025 (UTC)

Krystian Nowak (born 1 April 1994) is a Polish professional footballer who plays as a centre-back.

== Career ==
Nowak signed a two-year contract with Scottish Premiership club Heart of Midlothian in August 2016. Nowak made his Hearts debut on 23 December against Dundee. He only played once after Craig Levein was appointed manager in September 2017, and he was allowed to leave in January 2018.

Nowak signed for the League of Ireland Premier Division side Bohemian FC in February 2023. He scored his first goal for the club against Sligo Rovers in The Showgrounds. On 12 November 2023, Nowak scored an own goal in the 2023 FAI Cup Final, in a 3–1 defeat to Dublin rivals St Patrick's Athletic at the Aviva Stadium.

On 1 March 2024, Kazakh side Zhenis announced the signing of Nowak, who made his Kazakhstan Premier League debut on the same day in a 2–0 loss against Astana. On 9 July 2025, Nowak announced his departure from the club.

Later that month, on 13 July, Nowak signed with Uzbek club Andijon until the end of 2026. He made a total of 20 appearances across all competitions before leaving Andijon on 15 February 2026.

== Career statistics ==
As of match played 24 December 2025

Appearances and goals by club, season and competition
Club	Season	League			National cup (Note: Includes Polish Cup, Scottish Cup, Greek Football Cup, Croatian Football Cup, Cupa României, FAI Cup, Kazakhstan Cup)		League cup (Note: Includes Scottish League Cup, Kazakhstan League Cup)		Continental		Other		Total	
Club	Season	Division	Apps	Goals	Apps	Goals	Apps	Goals	Apps	Goals	Apps	Goals	Apps	Goals
UKS SMS Łódź	2010–11	III liga	21	1	0	0	—		—		—		21	1
Tur Turek (loan)	2011–12	I liga	18	0	0	0	—		—		—		18	0
Widzew Łódź (loan)	2012–13	Ekstraklasa	17	1	0	0	—		—		—		17	1
Widzew Łódź	2013–14	Ekstraklasa	32	1	1	0	—		—		—		33	1
Widzew Łódź	2014–15	I liga	29	3	1	0	—		—		—		30	3
Widzew Łódź	Total		78	5	2	0	—		—		—		80	5
Podbeskidzie Bielsko-Biała	2015–16	Ekstraklasa	21	0	0	0	—		—		—		21	0
Heart of Midlothian	2016–17	Scottish Premiership	17	1	2	0	0	0	0	0	—		19	1
Heart of Midlothian	2017–18	Scottish Premiership	3	0	0	0	3	0	—		—		6	0
Heart of Midlothian	Total		20	1	2	0	3	0	0	0	—		25	1
Panionios	2017–18	Super League Greece	0	0	1	0	—		—		—		1	0
Slaven Belupo	2018–19	Croatian Football League	20	1	1	1	—		—		—		21	2
Slaven Belupo	2019–20	Croatian Football League	14	2	2	0	—		—		—		16	2
Slaven Belupo	Total		34	3	3	1	—		—		—		37	4
Widzew Łódź	2020–21	I liga	25	1	2	1	—		—		—		27	2
Widzew Łódź	2021–22	I liga	26	1	2	0	—		—		—		28	1
Widzew Łódź	Total		51	2	4	1	—		—		—		55	3
Universitatea Cluj	2022–23	Liga I	0	0	3	0	—		—		—		3	0
Bohemians	2023	LOI Premier Division	31	1	5	1	—		—		0	0	36	2
Zhenis	2024	Kazakhstan Premier League	24	0	1	0	5	0	—		—		30	0
Zhenis	2025	Kazakhstan Premier League	8	0	2	0	0	0	—		—		10	0
Zhenis	Total		32	0	3	0	5	0	—		—		40	0
Andijon	2025	Uzbekistan Super League	14	0	0	0	—		6 (Note: Appearances in AFC Champions League Two)	0	—		20	0
Career total			320	13	23	3	8	0	6	0	0	0	357	16
