= Drew Baker =

English footballer

Personal information
- Full name: Andrew Macdonald Baker
- Date of birth: 8 October 2002 (age 24)
- Place of birth: Cheshire, England
- Position: Centre-back

Team information
- Current team: Hyde United

Youth career
- 2007–2017: Manchester City
- 2017–2019: Crewe Alexandra
- 2019–2021: Oldham Athletic

Senior career*
Years	Team	Apps	(Gls)
2021–2022	FC United of Manchester	20	(1)
2022–2024	Fleetwood Town	8	(0)
2023	→ Bohemians (loan)	1	(0)
2023	→ Waterford (loan)	8	(0)
2024	Macclesfield	12	(0)
2024–	Hyde United	36	(4)
- * Club domestic league appearances and goals as of 11:47, 6 May 2025 (UTC)

Andrew Macdonald Baker (born 8 October 2002) is an English professional footballer who plays as a centre-back for Northern Premier League Premier Division club Hyde United.

== Career ==
Baker was born in Cheshire but attended Manchester Grammar School. Whilst at the school, he was called up in November 2019 to the England Independent Schools Under-18 age group matches against Wales Colleges and England Colleges. He started his youth career in the Academy at Manchester City where he played for ten years from the under-4 to under-14 level, winning the Premier League Championship three times. He subsequently spent two years in the youth team at Crewe Alexandra before signing a two-year scholarship at EFL League Two side Oldham Athletic. In May 2021, it was announced that he would not be offered a professional contract at Oldham and that he would be released at the end of his scholarship.

He dropped down to Non-League when he signed for Northern Premier League Premier Division side FC United of Manchester for the 2021–22 campaign, following a trial during pre-season. As the club only trained part-time, he also worked as an IT Consultant. He was an ever-present in the backline going onto make twenty-seven appearances in all competitions, scoring one goal in a 3–1 win over Witton Albion.

On 4 January 2022, he signed for EFL League One side Fleetwood Town on a deal until the summer of 2023, with the club holding an option for another one-year extension. Upon signing, he was immediately placed into the Development Squad. On 23 August 2022, he made his professional debut at the age of 19, when he started in the 1–0 EFL Cup second round defeat at home to Premier League side Everton. On 3 September he made his League One Debut against Wycombe Wanders in a 1–1 draw.

On 16 February 2023, Baker signed for League of Ireland Premier Division club Bohemians on loan until the end of June.

On 4 July 2023, Baker signed for League of Ireland First Division side Waterford, sister club of Fleetwood Town, on loan until the end of their season in November.

On 4 January 2024, Baker joined NPL Premier Division club Macclesfield on a permanent transfer.

In July 2024, Baker joined fellow NPL Premier Division side Hyde United following a successful trial period, where he went on to play an important role, as the club managed to secure a 9th place finish.

== Career statistics ==
As of match played 21 August 2023

Appearances and goals by club, season and competition
Club	Season	League			National Cup		League Cup		Other		Total	
Club	Season	Division	Apps	Goals	Apps	Goals	Apps	Goals	Apps	Goals	Apps	Goals
FC United of Manchester	2021–22	NPL Premier Division	20	1	4	0	—		3 (Note: Two appearances in FA Trophy, one in Fenix Trophy)	0	27	1
Fleetwood Town	2022–23	League One	8	0	1	0	1	0	2	0	12	0
Bohemians (loan)	2023	LOI Premier Division	1	0	—		—		1 (Note: Appearance in Leinster Senior Cup)	0	2	0
Waterford (loan)	2023	LOI First Division	4	0	2	0	—		0	0	6	0
Hyde United FC	2024	NPL Premier Division	36	4							36	4
Career total			69	4	7	0	1	0	4	0	83	5
