= James Akintunde =

English footballer (born 1996)

Personal information
- Full name: Oluwaseun Ewerogba Akintunde
- Date of birth: 29 March 1996 (age 30)
- Place of birth: Greenwich, England
- Height: 5 ft 9 in (1.75 m)
- Position: Forward

Team information
- Current team: Coleraine
- Number: 25

Youth career
- Southend United
- Cambridge United

Senior career*
Years	Team	Apps	(Gls)
2013–2016	Cambridge United	1	(0)
2014	→ AFC Sudbury (loan)	23	(2)
2014–2015	→ Histon (loan)	11	(3)
2015–2016	→ Brackley Town (loan)	6	(1)
2016	→ Needham Market (loan)	9	(0)
2016–2018	Chester	56	(11)
2018–2020	Maidenhead United	57	(2)
2020–2022	Derry City	77	(14)
2023–2024	Bohemians	46	(6)
2025–2026	Haka	23	(4)
2026–	Coleraine	10	(2)
- * Club domestic league appearances and goals as of 29 April 2026

Oluwaseun Ewerogba "James" Akintunde (born 29 March 1996) is an English professional footballer who plays as a forward for NIFL Premiership club Coleraine.

== Career ==
Akintunde was a Cambridge United youth graduate, and made his first team debut on 30 November 2013, coming on as a late substitute in a 1–0 FA Trophy away win against Salisbury City. On 29 August 2014 he was loaned to Histon until January.

In January 2015, after scoring six goals for Histon in all competitions, Akintunde returned to the U's. He made his professional debut on 14 February 2015, again from the bench in a 0–2 away loss against Plymouth Argyle. He played no games for Cambridge the following season, but did play out on loan at Brackley Town and Needham Market. Akintunde was released by Cambridge United at the end of the 2015–16 season.

Akintunde joined Chester for the 2016–17 season. He spent two full seasons at the Deva, scoring eleven times in sixty games, before joining Maidenhead United for 2018–19. Akintunde scored twice in 62 games before leaving the Magpies at the end of the 2019–20 season. Akintunde signed for League of Ireland Premier Division team Derry City on 24 July 2020. He scored on his debut against St Patrick's Athletic on 3 August 2020. Akintunde signed a multi year contract with Bohemians ahead of their 2023 season. On 2 November 2024, it was announced that Akintunde had left Bohemians following the end of his contract.

On 17 January 2025, Akintunde signed with Finnish Veikkausliiga club Haka.

On 25 December 2025, Akintunde signed with NIFL Premiership club Coleraine.

== Career statistics ==
As of 2 March 2026

Appearances and goals by club, season and competition
Club	Season	League			National Cup (Note: Includes FA Cup, FAI Cup and Finnish Cup)		League cup (Note: Includes Finnish League Cup)		Other		Total	
Club	Season	Division	Apps	Goals	Apps	Goals	Apps	Goals	Apps	Goals	Apps	Goals
Cambridge United	2013–14	Conference Premier	0	0	0	0	—		1 (Note: Appearance(s) in FA Trophy)	0	1	0
Cambridge United	2014–15	League Two	1	0	0	0	0	0	0	0	1	0
Cambridge United	2015–16	League Two	0	0	0	0	0	0	0	0	0	0
Cambridge United	Total		1	0	0	0	0	0	1	0	2	0
AFC Sudbury (loan)	2013–14	IL Division One North	23	2	0	0	—		0	0	23	2
Histon (loan)	2014–15	SFL Premier Division	11	3	2	0	—		3 (Note: Two appearances and two goals in FA Trophy, one appearance in Southern League Cup)	3	16	6
Brackley Town (loan)	2015–16	National League North	6	1	2	0	—		0	0	8	1
Needham Market (loan)	2015–16	IL Premier Division	7	0	0	0	—		0	0	7	0
Chester	2016–17	National League	16	3	1	0	—		0	0	17	3
Chester	2017–18	National League	40	8	1	0	—		2	0	43	8
Chester	Total		56	11	2	0	—		2	0	60	11
Maidenhead United	2018–19	National League	30	1	2	0	—		1	0	33	1
Maidenhead United	2019–20	National League	27	1	0	0	—		2	0	29	1
Maidenhead United	Total		57	2	2	0	—		3	0	62	2
Derry City	2020	LOI Premier Division	10	4	2	0	—		1 (Note: Appearance(s) in UEFA Europa League)	0	13	4
Derry City	2021	LOI Premier Division	34	4	1	0	—		0	0	35	4
Derry City	2022	LOI Premier Division	33	6	3	2	—		2 (Note: Appearance(s) in UEFA Europa Conference League)	0	38	8
Derry City	Total		77	14	6	2	—		3	0	86	16
Bohemians	2023	LOI Premier Division	19	1	1	0	—		0	0	20	1
Bohemians	2024	LOI Premier Division	27	5	2	0	—		0	0	29	5
Bohemians	Total		46	6	3	0	—		0	0	49	6
Haka	2025	Veikkausliiga	23	4	3	2	4	1	–		30	7
Coleraine	2025–26	NIFL Premiership	8	2	1	0	1	1	–		10	3
Career total			315	45	21	4	5	2	12	3	353	54
