= Kris Twardek =

Canadian professional soccer player (born 1997)

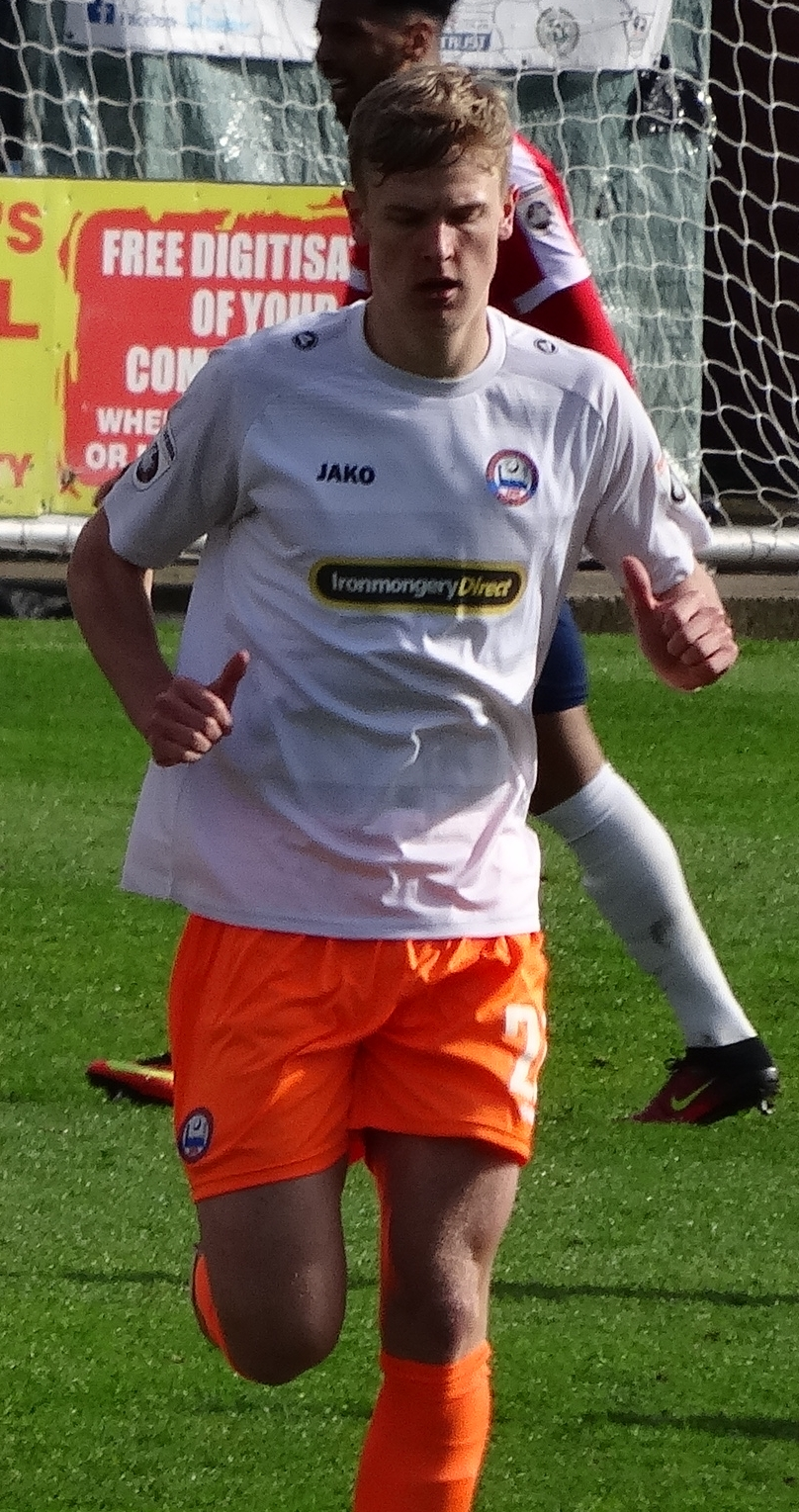
- Twardek playing for Braintree Town in 2017

Personal information
- Full name: Kristopher David Twardek
- Date of birth: 8 March 1997 (age 29)
- Place of birth: Toronto, Ontario, Canada
- Height: 1.85 m (6 ft 1 in)
- Position: Winger

Team information
- Current team: Galway United
- Number: 11

Youth career
- West Carleton SC
- Ottawa South United
- 2013–2015: Millwall

Senior career*
Years	Team	Apps	(Gls)
2015–2018	Millwall	2	(0)
2017	→ Braintree Town (loan)	12	(0)
2018	→ Carlisle United (loan)	12	(0)
2018–2019	Sligo Rovers	47	(2)
2020	Bohemians	13	(1)
2020–2021	Jagiellonia Białystok	15	(0)
2021	FK Senica	18	(0)
2022–2023	Bohemians	48	(1)
2024	Atlético Ottawa	22	(1)
2025	Valour FC	27	(4)
2026–	Galway United	29	(8)

International career^{‡}
2013–2014	Czech Republic U17	11	(1)
2015	Czech Republic U18	4	(0)
2016	Czech Republic U19	2	(0)
2017	Canada U20	5	(2)
2018	Canada U23	4	(0)
2017	Canada	1	(0)
- * Club domestic league appearances and goals as of October 30, 2026 ‡ National team caps and goals as of 8 June 2018

Kristopher David Twardek (born 8 March 1997) is a Canadian professional soccer player who plays as a winger for League of Ireland Premier Division club Galway United. A former youth international for the Czech Republic, he has been capped by Canada at full international level.

== Early life ==
Twardek was born in Toronto, Ontario and raised in Ottawa. His father is Czech and his mother is Canadian.

== Club career ==
=== Early career ===
Twardek began playing with West Carleton SC at the age of five. He graduated from the Ottawa South United Academy before signing for English club Millwall.

=== Millwall ===
In 2013, Twardek joined the academy of English Championship side Millwall and signed his first professional contract with the club in April 2015.

After missing the start of the 2015–16 season, due to a dislocated toe sustained in July, he returned from injury on 8 October 2015, playing in the reserve match against Plymouth Argyle U21. Towards the end of the 2015–16 season, Twardek appeared three times as an unused substitute. Following this, Twardek signed a one–year contract extension with the club.

Twardek made his senior debut for Millwall on 30 August 2016, in an EFL Trophy game against West Bromwich Albion under-23s, where he set up a goal for Jimmy Abdou, in a 2–0 win. However, although he made three appearances, his first team place at Millwall became limited, leading him to get loaned out for first team football. By the time he went out on loan, he made three appearances for the side.

In the 2017–18 season, Twardek made his league debut for Millwall on 21 November 2017, coming on as a late substitute, in a 0–0 draw against Hull City. He went on to make two more appearances for the side before being loaned out to Carlisle United. He was released by Millwall at the end of the 2017–18 season.

==== Loan to Braintree Town ====
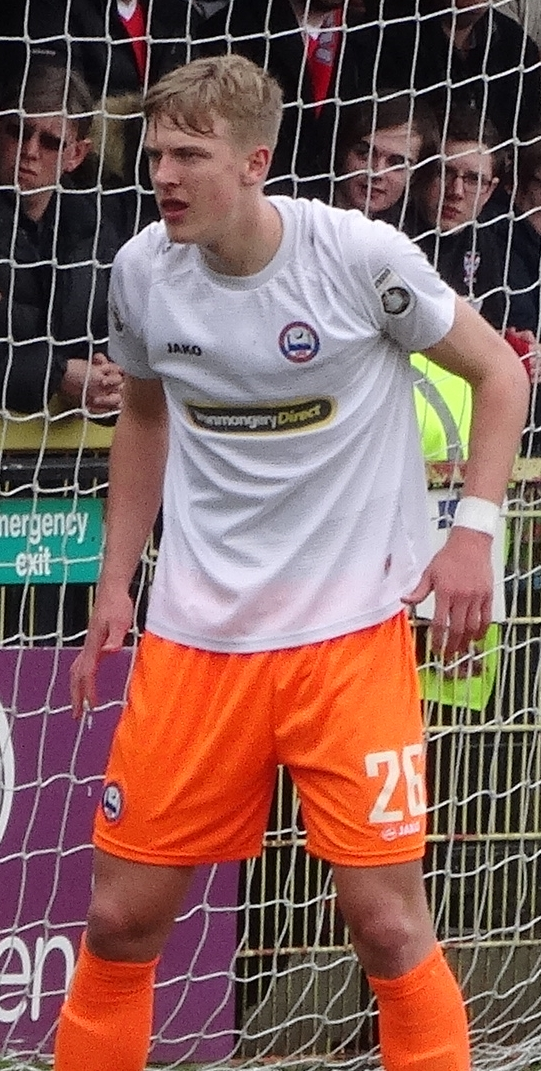
Twardek defending a corner against York City on 1 April 2017, while at Braintree Town.

On 5 January 2017, Twardek joined National League side Braintree Town on a 28-day loan. He made his Braintree Town debut two days later, where he started the whole game and set up a goal, in a 2–1 loss against Chester. His performance at Braintree Town resulted in his loan spell being extended for another month and eventually for the rest of the season. He went on to make 12 appearances for the side, as Braintree Town were relegated from the National League at the end of the season after finishing in the bottom four.

==== Loan to Carlisle United ====
Twardek moved on loan to Carlisle United on 26 January 2018 for the rest of the season. He made his Carlisle United debut, where he started and earned himself a Man of the Match, in a 1–0 win over Forest Green Rovers on 30 January 2018. Although he made three more starts, Twardek most appearances comes from substitute bench, leading him to make 12 appearances for Carlisle United. At the end of the 2017–18 season, Twardek's loan spell with Carlisle United came to an end.

=== Sligo Rovers ===
After being released by Millwall, Twardek joined Irish club Sligo Rovers on 3 July 2018. Twardek made his Sligo Rovers debut, where he came on as a substitute for Caolan McAleer in the 69th minute, in a 2–1 loss against Bray Wanderers on 8 July 2018. He scored his first goal for the club on 1 March 2019 against Finn Harps in a 2–1 victory. Twardek was acknowledged as the club's Player of the Month in July and August 2019. He left the club at the end of the 2019 season.

=== Bohemians ===
In November 2019, Twardek signed for Bohemians ahead of the 2020 season. He scored his first goal for the club in a 2-0 league win over his former side Sligo Rovers on 24 April 2020 in Dalymount Park. Twardek was named February Player of the Month by the club's fans via an online poll.

=== Jagiellonia Białystok ===
On 2 October 2020 Ekstraklasa club Jagiellonia Białystok announced they had signed Twardek.

=== FK Senica ===
After terminating his contract with Jagiellonia through a mutual agreement, Twardek signed with FK Senica of the Fortuna Liga. He debuted in the league on 1 August 2021 in a home fixture against Spartak Trnava, which concluded in a 2–1 victory for Senica.

=== Return to Bohemians ===
In December 2021, it was announced that Twardek would return to League of Ireland Premier Division club Bohemians on a multi-year contract. After two seasons with the club, Twardek departed after the 2023 season.

=== Atlético Ottawa ===
On 30 January 2024, it was announced that Twardek had signed a two-year contract, with an option for a third year, with Canadian Premier League club Atlético Ottawa. On 13 April 2024, he scored in his debut in the season opener against York United FC.

=== Valour FC ===
On January 10, 2025, Canadian Premier League club Valour FC announced that Twardek had signed a one-year contract with them for 2025, with an option for 2026.

=== Galway United ===
On 1 December 2025 it was announced that Twardek had signed for League of Ireland Premier Division side Galway United ahead of the 2026 season.

== International career ==
Twardek is eligible to play for Czech Republic (through his father and passport) and Canada (through his mother and his birth country). Having been capped for the Czech Republic levels from under-17 to under-19 side, he switched his international allegiance to Canada in 2016.

=== Youth ===
In October 2013, Twardek was called up by Czech Republic national under-17 side, leading him to make his debut against Israel U17, in a 4–2 win. On 20 February 2014, he scored his first Czech Republic U17 goal, in a 2–2 draw against Wales U17. Twardek went on to make 11 appearances and scoring once, with his last appearance came on 31 March 2014 against Albania U17, with a 2–0 win.

In April 2015, Twardek was called up by the under-18 side, making his debut on 20 April 2015, in a 2–1 win over United Arab Emirates U18. He went on to make three more appearances for the under-18 side. The following year, in February 2016, Twardek was called up by under-19. He played in both matches against Greece U19 on 2 February 2016 and 4 February 2016, drawing 1–1 and losing 1–0 respectively.

Despite making no appearances since switching to Canada, Twardek was nominated for the Canada Soccer U20 Player of the Year award in 2016. In February 2017, Twardek was named to Canada's roster for the 2017 CONCACAF U-20 Championship He didn't made his debut for the side until on 17 February 2017, where he started and played the whole game, in a 1–0 loss against Honduras U20. He then scored his first goal for the side, in a 2–0 win over Antigua and Barbuda U20 on 23 February 2017. He was named the Canada Soccer U20 Player of the Year in December 2017.

In May 2018, Twardek was named to Canada's under-21 squad for the 2018 Toulon Tournament. He made his debut for the side on 28 May 2018, where he was given the captaincy and played 66 minutes before coming off as a substitute, in a 0–0 draw against Portugal U19. Twardek then captained the side on two more occasions. Twardek was named to the Canadian U-23 provisional roster for the 2020 CONCACAF Men's Olympic Qualifying Championship on 26 February 2020. He was named to the final squad ahead of the rescheduled tournament on 10 March 2021, but pulled out due to injury.

=== Senior ===
Twardek was called up to the Canadian senior team for a friendly against El Salvador on 29 September 2017. He made his national team debut against El Salvador, where he came on as a late substitute, in a 1–0 loss.

== Career statistics ==
As of October 30, 2026

Appearances and goals by club, season and competition
Club	Season	League			National Cup		League Cup		Other		Total	
Club	Season	Division	Apps	Goals	Apps	Goals	Apps	Goals	Apps	Goals	Apps	Goals
Millwall	2016–17	League One	0	0	0	0	0	0	3 (Note: Appearances in EFL Trophy)	0	3	0
Millwall	2017–18	Championship	2	0	1	0	0	0	0	0	3	0
Millwall	Total		2	0	1	0	0	0	3	0	6	0
Braintree Town (loan)	2016–17	National League	12	0	—		—		3 (Note: Appearances in FA Trophy)	0	15	0
Carlisle United (loan)	2017–18	League Two	12	0	0	0	0	0	0	0	12	0
Sligo Rovers	2018	LOI Premier Division	11	0	0	0	1	0	2 (Note: Appearances in Scottish Challenge Cup)	0	14	0
Sligo Rovers	2019	LOI Premier Division	36	2	3	5	1	0	0	0	41	7
Sligo Rovers	Total		47	2	3	5	2	0	2	0	55	7
Bohemians	2020	LOI Premier Division	13	1	1	0	—		1 (Note: Appearances in UEFA Europa League)	0	15	1
Jagiellonia Białystok	2020–21	Ekstraklasa	15	0	0	0	—		—		15	0
FK Senica	2021–22	Slovak Super Liga	18	0	1	0	—		—		19	0
Bohemians	2022	LOI Premier Division	29	1	2	0	—		—		31	1
Bohemians	2023	LOI Premier Division	19	0	2	1	—		3 (Note: Appearances in Leinster Senior Cup)	1	25	2
Bohemians	Total		48	1	4	1	—		3	1	55	3
Atlético Ottawa	2024	Canadian Premier League	22	1	3	0	—		1	0	26	1
Valour FC	2025	Canadian Premier League	27	4	3	0	—		—		30	4
Galway United	2026	LOI Premier Division	29	8	4	0	—		—		33	8
Career total			245	17	22	6	2	0	13	1	282	24

== Honours ==
=== Team ===
Bohemians

- Leinster Senior Cup: 2023

=== Individual ===
- Canada Soccer U20 Player of the Year: 2017
