= Ryan Burke =

Irish association footballer (born 2000)

Personal information
- Full name: Ryan Darren Burke
- Date of birth: 23 November 2000 (age 25)
- Place of birth: Dublin, Ireland
- Positions: Left back; centre back

Team information
- Current team: Bohemians
- Number: 3

Youth career
- 2009–2012: Crumlin United
- 2012–2016: St Joseph's Boys
- 2016–2017: St Patrick's Athletic
- 2017–2019: Birmingham City

Senior career*
Years	Team	Apps	(Gls)
2019–2021	Birmingham City	1	(0)
2020–2021	→ Yeovil Town (loan)	5	(0)
2021–2022	Mansfield Town	4	(0)
2022	→ AFC Telford United (loan)	15	(1)
2022–2023	Bohemians	5	(0)
2023–2025	Waterford	93	(4)
2026–	Bohemians	6	(1)

International career
2016	Republic of Ireland U16	1	(0)
- * Club domestic league appearances and goals as of 16:35, 9 November 2026 (UTC)

Ryan Darren Burke (born 23 November 2000) is an Irish professional footballer who plays as a Left back or Centre back for League of Ireland club Bohemians. He joined English club Birmingham City from St Patrick's Athletic as a 16-year-old and made his Football League debut in July 2020. He spent time on loan at National League club Yeovil Town, before being released by Birmingham in 2021. He signed a one-year contract with League Two club Mansfield Town in 2021, and played on loan at National League North club AFC Telford United in 2022 before his release from Mansfield and return to Ireland. Burke has represented Ireland at under-15 and under-16 level.

== Club career ==
=== Early life and career ===
Burke was born in Dublin and attended Drimnagh Castle Secondary School. He played at youth level for Crumlin United and spent four years with St Joseph's Boys before joining St Patrick's Athletic. He started every match as St Pat's under-17 team won the 2016 League of Ireland U17 Division title, and remained a regular in the side until taking up a scholarship with Birmingham City's Academy in 2017.

According to his Birmingham City profile, his strengths at youth level were "his technical ability, aggression and tackling". He was a member of their under-18 team that reached the semifinal of the 2017–18 FA Youth Cup, made his debut for their under-23 side the day after his 17th birthday, and became a regular at that level the following season. He signed his first professional contract, of two years, in June 2019.

=== Birmingham City ===
When head coach Pep Clotet fielded an inexperienced team for the visit to Portsmouth in the 2019–20 EFL Cup first round, in which several youngsters made their senior debuts, Burke was an unused substitute. After the 2019–20 EFL Championship season resumed following its suspension because of the COVID-19 pandemic, he was named on the bench for Birmingham's first match under the temporary rules. He remained unused, but was given his senior debut by caretaker head coaches Steve Spooner and Craig Gardner on 12 July away to Stoke City, replacing Nico Gordon after 72 minutes of the 2–0 defeat.

Burke joined National League club Yeovil Town on 22 September 2020, on loan until January 2021. He made six appearances before returning to his parent club, but had no further involvement with the first-team matchday squad, and was released when his contract expired at the end of the season. His last appearance was for Birmingham's U23 team as they beat Sheffield United U23 in the national final of the 2020–21 Professional Development League.

=== Mansfield Town ===
Burke signed a one-year contract with EFL League Two club Mansfield Town on 2 July 2021. He made his debut in the starting eleven for the EFL Cup first-round tie against Preston North End, replacing James Perch in defence; Preston won 3–0. Although a regular in the matchday squad for the first half of the season as backup for Stephen McLaughlin, Burke made only seven appearances, mostly as a substitute. In January 2022, manager Nigel Clough said he had not seen enough of the player to decide whether he should remain as part of the Mansfield squad or go out on loan.

Having dropped out of first-team contention at Mansfield, Burke joined National League North club AFC Telford United on 26 February 2022 on a month's loan. He made seven appearances in his first month, and the loan was extended to the end of the season. On 2 April, he scored his first goal at senior club level, an 86th-minute winner against Gloucester City, when he "drilled a low, left-footed shot on the run past [the goalkeeper's] dive and into the far side of the goal." Burke played every minute of the last 15 games of Telford's season as they finished just above the relegation zone. He was one of six young professionals released by Mansfield when their contracts expired at the end of the season.

=== Bohemians ===
Burke returned home to Dublin as a free agent and signed for League of Ireland Premier Division club Bohemians on a multi-year contract in June 2022. He made his debut as a stoppage-time substitute in Bohs' 3–1 win away to UCD on 7 July.

=== Waterford ===
On 13 February 2023, it was announced that Burke had signed for League of Ireland First Division side Waterford on a permanent basis. On 21 November 2025, it was announced that Burke would be departing the club after scoring 6 goals in 103 appearances during his 3 seasons with the club.

=== Return to Bohemians ===
On 12 January 2026, Burke signed for his former club Bohemians.

== International career ==
Burke has represented Ireland at under-15 and under-16 levels.

== Career statistics ==
As of match played 23 October 2026

Appearances and goals by club, season and competition
Club	Season	League			National cup		League cup		Other		Total	
Club	Season	Division	Apps	Goals	Apps	Goals	Apps	Goals	Apps	Goals	Apps	Goals
Birmingham City	2019–20	Championship	1	0	0	0	0	0	—		1	0
Birmingham City	2020–21	Championship	0	0	—		0	0	—		0	0
Birmingham City	Total		1	0	0	0	0	0	—		1	0
Yeovil Town (loan)	2020–21	National League	5	0	1	0	—		0	0	6	0
Mansfield Town	2021–22	EFL League Two	4	0	0	0	1	0	2 (Note: Appearances in the EFL Trophy)	0	7	0
AFC Telford United (loan)	2021–22	National League North	15	1	—		—		—		15	1
Bohemians	2022	LOI Premier Division	5	0	2	0	—		—		7	0
Bohemians	2023	LOI Premier Division	—		—		—		1 (Note: Appearances in the Leinster Senior Cup)	1	1	1
Bohemians	Total		5	0	2	0	—		1	1	8	1
Waterford	2023	LOI First Division	36	3	1	0	—		1 (Note: Appearances in the 2023 League of Ireland First Division Play-offs)	0	38	3
Waterford	2024	LOI Premier Division	24	0	2	1	—		2 (Note: Appearance(s) in the Munster Senior Cup)	0	28	1
Waterford	2025	LOI Premier Division	33	1	2	0	—		2 (Note: 1 appearance in the Munster Senior Cup; 1 appearance in the 2025 League of Ireland Premier Division Promotion/Relegation play-off)	1	36	2
Waterford	Total		93	4	5	1	—		5	1	103	6
Bohemians	2026	LOI Premier Division	6	1	0	0	—		2	0	8	1
Career total			129	7	8	1	1	0	10	2	148	9
