= 2022–23 Leinster Senior Cup =

2022-23 Leinster Senior Cup
Leinster Football Association Senior Cup

Tournament details
- Country: Republic of Ireland

Final positions
- Champions: Bohemians
- Runners-up: Usher Celtic

The 2023 Leinster Senior Cup was the 119th staging of the Leinster Football Association's primary competition. It included all Leinster based League of Ireland clubs from the Premier Division and First Division, as well as a selection of intermediate level sides. The competition marked the return of the cup since it went on hiatus during the COVID-19 pandemic in Ireland. The competition began on the weekend of 3 September 2022 and ended on 18 September 2023 when Bohemians defeated Usher Celtic in the final at Dalymount Park .

== Round 1 ==
3 September 2022	Sheriff YC	4-0	Clara Town

3 September 2022	Dynamo Dublin	1-2	Evergreen

3 September 2022	St Peter's	4-0	Hardwicke

11 September 2022	Clonmullion	2-3	Oliver Bond Celtic

11 September 2022	VEC	0-7	Usher Celtic

1 October 2022	Trim Celtic	4-5	New Oak Boys

Teams receiving byes: North End United, Kilbarrack United, Suncroft, Gorey Rangers

== Round 2 ==
30 September 2022	St Peter's	2-3	Gorey Rangers

30 September 2022	Oliver Bond Celtic	w/o	Suncroft

30 September 2022	New Oak Boys	1-0	Kilbarrack United

1 October 2022	North End United	3-2	Evergreen

28 October 2022	Usher Celtic	5-1	Sheriff Y.C.

== Round 3 ==
30 October 2022	New Oak Boys	2-2	Killester Donnycarney

27 November 2022	North End United	5-0	Oliver Bond Celtic

30 November 2022	Liffey Wanderers	0-4	Malahide United

30 November 2022	St. Mochta's	3-4	Crumlin United

13 January 2023	Usher Celtic	4-2	Gorey Rangers

== Round 4 ==
27 January 2023	Malahide United	2–3 (a.e.t.)	Usher Celtic	Malahide
19:45	Rooney 10'; McGahon 32'; McEvoy (yellow card) 34' (yellow-red card) 66'		Curran 60'; McMahon 83'; Doyle 112'	Stadium: Gannon Park; Attendance: 100; Referee: Lee Duffy

29 January 2023	North End United	1–5	Bohemians	Wexford
14:00	Rhodes 30'; Murphy (red card) 61'		Flores 10'; Williams 60', 78'; Burke 83'; Horton 87'	Stadium: Hollygrove; Attendance: 400; Referee: Gavin Colfer

31 January 2023	St Patrick's Athletic	1–3	Wexford	Inchicore
19:45	Melia 90+2'		Adeyemo 10', 12', 75'	Stadium: Richmond Park; Attendance: 800; Referee: Paul Norton

4 February 2023	UCD	1–4	Shamrock Rovers	Belfield, Dublin
15:00	Wells (red card) 61'; Higgins 75'		Poom 10'; Kenny 28'; Gaffney 45'; Carey 88'	Stadium: UCD Bowl; Attendance: 500; Referee: Alan Patchell

10 February 2023	Drogheda United	2–0	Athlone Town	Drogheda
19:45	Markey 22', 90+4'			Stadium: Weavers Park; Attendance: 1,329; Referee: Alan Carey

12 February 2023	New Oak Boys	0–3	Bray Wanderers	Carlow
14:00		Report	Almirall 21'; Shortt 53'; Crowley 77'	Stadium: Burrin Road; Attendance: 562; Referee: David Connolly

21 February 2023	Crumlin United	2-2 (a.e.t.) (5-4 p)	Longford Town	Crumlin, Dublin
19:45	Martins 28'; McAdams 99' (pen.)		Doona 17'; Boudiaf 128'	Stadium: Pearse Park; Attendance: 270; Referee: Daniel Murphy

24 March 2023	Dundalk	0-4	Shelbourne	Dundalk
19:45	Muller (red card) 5'		Moylan 8'; Robinson 35'; Caffrey 69'; Arubi 82'	Stadium: Oriel Park; Attendance: 950; Referee: Rob Harvey
Note: Shelbourne originally awarded 2-0 win as Dundalk failed to fulfil fixture. However an appeal by Dundalk was successful and a new date was arranged.

== Quarter final ==
27 February 2023	Drogheda United	2–4 (a.e.t.)	Usher Celtic	Drogheda
19:45	Grimes 6'; Davis 17'		Gannon 33' 95'; Kilkenny 59' (pen.); Keane 103'	Stadium: Weavers Park; Attendance: 1,237; Referee: David Dunne

12 March 2023	Crumlin United	0–1 (a.e.t.)	Bohemians	Phibsborough
14:00			O'Sullivan 101'	Stadium: Dalymount Park; Attendance: 1,032; Referee: Adriano Reale

13 March 2023	Bray Wanderers	2–1	Shamrock Rovers	Bray
19:45	Davis 31' (pen.); Power 40'	Report	Ferizaj 88'	Stadium: Carlisle Grounds; Attendance: 1,172; Referee: Paul Norton

8 May 2023	Shelbourne	2-0	Wexford	Drumcondra
19:45	Arubi 32'; Robinson 45'			Stadium: Tolka Park; Attendance: 500; Referee: Oliver Moran

== Semi final ==
17 April 2023	Bray Wanderers	1-4	Usher Celtic	Bray
19:45	Shortt 43'		Douglas 1', 60'; Donohue 45' (o.g.); Walker 52'	Stadium: Carlisle Grounds; Attendance: 200; Referee: Gavin Colfer

3 July 2023	Shelbourne	3-4	Bohemians	Drumcondra
19:45	Robinson 33', 69'; Farrell 79' (pen.)		Jinadu 24'; O'Reilly 25'; Mooney 52'; Grogan 87'	Stadium: Tolka Park; Attendance: 2109; Referee: Alan Patchell

== Final ==
18 September 2023	Bohemians	5-0	Usher Celtic	Phibsborough
19:45	Mc Cormack 8'; McDaid 39'; Twardek 53'; Lotefa 64'; Coote 66'	Report		Stadium: Dalymount Park; Attendance: 3093; Referee: Paul Norton
