= 2020 Bohemian F.C. season =

Irish football club season

Bohemian F.C.
2020 season
- Manager: Keith Long
- Stadium: Dalymount Park, Phibsborough, Dublin 7
- Premier Division: 2nd
- FAI Cup: Quarter-final (vs. Dundalk)
- UEFA Europa League: First qualifying round (vs. Fehérvár)
- Top goalscorer: League: Andre Wright (8 goals); All: Andre Wright (9 goals)
- Highest home attendance: 3,580 vs. Shamrock Rovers, 15 February 2020, Premier Division
- Lowest home attendance: 2,859 * vs. Sligo Rovers, 24 February 2020, Premier Division
- Average home league attendance: 3,333 * Not including attendances for games during covid-19 restrictions
- Biggest win: 3-0 vs. Cork City; 9 October 2020, Premier Division
- Biggest defeat: 1-4 vs. Dundalk; 20 November 2020, FAI Cup
Home colours	Away colours	Third colours

The 2020 League of Ireland season was Bohemian Football Club's 130th year in their history and their 36th consecutive season in the League of Ireland Premier Division since it became the top tier of Irish football. Bohemians were due to participate in both national domestic cup competitions this season, namely the FAI Cup and the EA Sports Cup. The latter was deferred indefinitely due to the Coronavirus pandemic. Bohemians competed in the UEFA Europa League for the first time in seven years as they qualified with a third-place finish the previous season.

Bohs were drawn against arch-rivals Shamrock Rovers in an opening day Dublin Derby when fixtures for the 2020 season were released in late December 2019. They would go on to finish as Runners up in the Premier Division, securing European football for the second consecutive year.

The club announced record-high sales for season tickets and memberships prior to the start of their league campaign. However, all football activity in the Republic of Ireland was halted in March due to the Coronavirus pandemic. The Football Association of Ireland announced a contingency plan with a view to completing the domestic season at a later date, with a reduced number of games. Matches after the restart were played without fans in attendance.

== Club ==
=== Kits ===
Bohemians announced a new four-year partnership with Des Kelly Interiors as new main sponsors, beginning with the 2020 season. Manufactured by O'Neills, the red and black striped shirt features a special gold crest and has the club's name written in the Irish language. This is to mark the club's 130th anniversary and their 100th season in the League of Ireland.

On 12 February 2020 Bohemians announced a new away kit, a white jersey with diagonal red and black pinstripes. It includes a Refugees Welcome logo on the chest and is in conjunction with Amnesty International.

On 16 March 2020, Bohs launched a blue and navy striped third kit featuring a yellow trim. This kit also includes the commemorative inscriptions for the 130 year anniversary of the club. This kit was selected for use in Bohemians UEFA Europa League campaign.

Supplier: O'Neills / Sponsor: Des Kelly Interiors

=== Management team ===
Position	Name
Head coach	(Republic of Ireland) Keith Long
Assistant head coach	(Republic of Ireland) Trevor Croly
Assistant coaches	(England) Remy Tang (Strength & Conditioning)
Assistant coaches	(Republic of Ireland) Rob Murray (Fitness)
Assistant coaches	(Republic of Ireland) Cathal Murtagh (Sports Science)
Goalkeeper coach	(Scotland) Chris Bennion
Kit manager	(Republic of Ireland) Colin O Connor
Assistant kit manager	(Republic of Ireland) Aaron Fitzsimons

== Squad ==
No.	Player	Nat.	Pos.	Date of birth (age)	Since	Ends	Last club
Goalkeepers
1	James Talbot	(Republic of Ireland)	GK	24 April 1997 (age 28)	2019	2020	(England) Sunderland U23
25	Stephen McGuinness	(Republic of Ireland)	GK	10 March 1995 (age 30)	2020	2020	(Republic of Ireland) Cabinteely
29	Jamie Cleary	(Republic of Ireland)	GK	12 October 2001 (age 24)	2019	2020	(Republic of Ireland) Bohemians U19
Defenders
2	Andy Lyons	(Republic of Ireland)	RB	2 August 2000 (age 25)	2018	2020	(Republic of Ireland) Bohemians U19
3	Anthony Breslin	(Republic of Ireland)	LB	13 February 1997 (age 28)	2020	2020	(Republic of Ireland) Longford Town
4	Dan Casey	(Republic of Ireland)	CB	29 October 1997 (age 28)	2020	2020	(Republic of Ireland) Cork City
5	Rob Cornwall	(Republic of Ireland)	CB	16 October 1994 (age 31)	2017	2020	(Republic of Ireland) Shamrock Rovers
6	Ciaran Kelly†	(Republic of Ireland)	CB	4 July 1998 (age 27)	2020	2021	(Republic of Ireland) St Patrick's Athletic
18	James Finnerty	(Republic of Ireland)	CB	1 February 1999 (age 27)	2019	2020	(England) Rochdale
22	Paddy Kirk	(Republic of Ireland)	LB	2 June 1998 (age 27)	2018	2020	(Republic of Ireland) Bohemians U19
23	Michael Barker	(Republic of Ireland)	RB	16 August 1993 (age 32)	2019	2020	(Republic of Ireland) St Patrick's Athletic
Midfielders
7	Danny Mandroiu	(Republic of Ireland)	AM	20 October 1998 (age 27)	2019	2020	(England) Brighton & Hove Albion U23
8	Jonathan Lunney	(Republic of Ireland)	DM	2 February 1998 (age 28)	2020	2020	(Republic of Ireland) Waterford
10	Keith Ward	(Republic of Ireland)	AM	12 October 1990 (age 35)	2017	2020	(Republic of Ireland) Derry City
11	Kris Twardek	(Canada)	LW	8 March 1997 (age 28)	2020	2020	(Republic of Ireland) Sligo Rovers
12	Danny Grant	(Republic of Ireland)	RW	23 December 2000 (age 25)	2018	2020	(Republic of Ireland) Bohemians U19
14	Conor Levingston	(Republic of Ireland)	CM	21 January 1998 (age 28)	2019	2020	(England) Wolverhampton Wanderers U23
16	Keith Buckley (C)	(Republic of Ireland)	CM	17 June 1992 (age 33)	2018	2020	(Republic of Ireland) Bray Wanderers
17	Callum Thompson †	(Republic of Ireland)	RW	20 April 2001 (age 24)	2020	2020	(England) Wolverhampton Wanderers U23
21	Jack Moylan	(Republic of Ireland)	CM	1 September 2001 (age 24)	2019	2020	(Republic of Ireland) Bohemians U19
26	Ross Tierney	(Republic of Ireland)	CM	6 March 2001 (age 24)	2019	2020	(Republic of Ireland) Bohemians U19
27	Luke Wade-Slater	(Republic of Ireland)	RW	2 March 1998 (age 27)	2019	2020	(England) Stevenage
28	Dawson Devoy	(Republic of Ireland)	CM	20 November 2001 (age 24)	2019	2020	(Republic of Ireland) Bohemians U19
30	Promise Omochere	(Republic of Ireland)	RW	18 October 2000 (age 25)	2019	2020	(Republic of Ireland) Bohemians U19
Forwards
9	Dinny Corcoran	(Republic of Ireland)	CF	13 February 1989 (age 36)	2017	2020	(Republic of Ireland) St Patrick's Athletic
15	Andre Wright	(England)	CF	7 December 1996 (age 29)	2019	2020	(England) Torquay United
19	Glen McAuley	(Republic of Ireland)	FW	24 February 2000 (age 25)	2020	2020	(Republic of Ireland) St. Patrick's Athletic
20	Evan Ferguson	(Republic of Ireland)	FW	13 October 2004 (age 21)	2019	2020	(Republic of Ireland) Bohemians U17
-	Cristian Măgerușan	(Romania)	FW	16 September 1999 (age 26)	2018	2020	(Republic of Ireland) Bohemians U19

† Player out on loan

== Friendlies ==
=== Pre-season ===
21 January 2020	Bohemians	2-0	Longford Town	Clonshaugh, Dublin
19:30 GMT	Dinny Corcoran 24'; Daniel Grant 58'	Report		Stadium: AUL Complex; Attendance: 230 (est.)

28 January 2020	Drogheda United	2–4	Bohemians	Drogheda
19:30 GMT	Jordan Adeyemo 27'; Stephen Meaney 43'	Report	Andre Wright 11', 42'; Evan Ferguson 51', 90'	Stadium: United Park; Attendance: 200 (est.)
Note: This match was for the inaugural Vincent Hoey Perpetual Trophy

28 January 2020	Bohemians	0–0	Bray Wanderers	Abbotstown, Dublin
19:30 GMT		Report		Stadium: National Sports Campus; Attendance: N/A
Note: This match was played behind closed doors

31 January 2020	St Mochta’s	0–2	Bohemians	Clonsilla, Dublin
19:45 GMT		Report	Glen McAuley 35', 45'	Stadium: Porterstown Road; Attendance: 500 (est.)

1 February 2020	Bohemians	6–1	Wexford	Blanchardstown, Dublin
12:00 GMT	Dinny Corcoran 12', 43', 54'; Conor Levingston 36'; Kris Twardek 78'; James Carroll 87' (o.g.)	Report	Conor English 79'	Stadium: TU Blanchardstown; Attendance: 100 (est.)

8 February 2020	Galway United	P-P	Bohemians	Galway
14:00 GMT				Stadium: Eamonn Deacy Park
Note: Match cancelled due to inclement weather caused by Storm Ciara

=== Mid-season ===
14 July 2020	Dundalk	4–1	Bohemians	Dundalk
19:45 GMT	Jordan Flores 15' (pen.); Dane Massey 53'; Sean Gannon 58'; Patrick Hoban 85'	Report	Promise Omochere 89'	Stadium: Oriel Park; Attendance: N/A; Referee: Rob Hennessy
Note: This match was played behind closed doors

18 July 2020	Bohemians	1–0	Derry City	Phibsborough, Dublin
15:00 GMT	Andre Wright 32'	Report		Stadium: Dalymount Park; Attendance: N/A
Note: This match was played behind closed doors

20 July 2020	Linfield	3–0	Bohemians	Belfast
19:45 GMT	James Finnerty 32' (o.g.); Mark Stafford 48'; Ethan Boyle 51'	Report		Stadium: Windsor Park; Attendance: N/A; Referee: Tim Marshall
Note: This match was played behind closed doors

24 July 2020	Bohemians	3–1	Longford Town	Phibsborough, Dublin
19:45 GMT	Dawson Devoy 28'; Aodh Dervin 32' (o.g.); Keith Buckley 67'	Report	Callum Warfield 85'	Stadium: Dalymount Park; Attendance: N/A
Note: This match was played behind closed doors

== Competitions ==
=== Overview ===
Competition	Record							
Competition	P	W	D	L	GF	GA	GD	Win %
Premier Division	18	12	1	5	23	12	+11	66.67
FAI Cup	2	1	0	1	3	4	−1	50.00
Europa League	1	0	1	0	1	1	+0	0.00
Total	21	13	2	6	27	17	+10	61.90

Updated to match played 20 November 2020
Source: Competitions

=== League of Ireland ===
==== League table ====
Pos	Team	Pld	W	D	L	GF	GA	GD	Pts	Qualification or relegation
1	Shamrock Rovers (C)	18	15	3	0	44	7	+37	48	Qualification for Champions League first qualifying round
2	Bohemians	18	12	1	5	23	12	+11	37	Qualification for Europa Conference League first qualifying round (Note: Since the winners of the 2020 FAI Cup (Dundalk) qualified for European competition based on their league position, the final spot awarded to the Cup winner passed to the next best-placed team, i.e. fourth-placed team.)
3	Dundalk	18	7	5	6	25	23	+2	26	Qualification for Europa Conference League first qualifying round
4	Sligo Rovers	18	8	1	9	19	23	−4	25	Qualification for Europa Conference League first qualifying round
5	Waterford	18	7	3	8	17	22	−5	24	
6	St Patrick's Athletic	18	5	6	7	14	17	−3	21	
7	Derry City	18	5	5	8	18	18	0	20	
8	Finn Harps	18	5	5	8	15	24	−9	20	
9	Shelbourne (R)	18	5	4	9	13	22	−9	19	Qualification for relegation play-offs
10	Cork City (R)	18	2	5	11	10	30	−20	11	Relegation to League of Ireland First Division

Source: SSE Airtricity League, Soccerway
Rules for classification: 1) Points; 2) Goal difference; 3) Goals scored.
(C) Champions; (R) Relegated

==== Results summary ====
Overall								Home						Away					
Pld	W	D	L	GF	GA	GD	Pts	W	D	L	GF	GA	GD	W	D	L	GF	GA	GD
18	12	1	5	23	8	+15	37	6	0	3	13	3	+10	6	1	2	10	5	+5

==== Results by matchday ====
Matchday	1	2	3	4	5	6	7	8	9	10	11	12	13	14	15	16	17	18
Ground	H	A	H	A	H	A	H	A	H	A	H	A	H	A	H	A	H	A
Result	L	W	W	L	W	W	W	W	W	L	L	W	W	W	W	D	L	W
Position	6	4	3	3	3	3	2	2	2	2	2	2	2	2	2	2	2	2

A = Away; H = Home; W = Win; D = Draw; L = Loss

==== Matches ====
Win Draw Loss

15 February 2020 Round 1	Bohemians	0—1	Shamrock Rovers	Phibsborough, Dublin
14:00 GMT	Andy Lyons (yellow card) 2' (yellow-red card) 65'; Keith Buckley (yellow card) 5'; James Finnerty (yellow card) 32'; Luke Wade-Slater (yellow card) 63'; Danny Mandroiu (yellow card) 71'	Report	Liam Scales (yellow card) 76'; Aaron Greene 90+3'	Stadium: Dalymount Park; Attendance: 3,580; Referee: Robert Hennessy

21 February 2020 Round 2	Waterford	0—2	Bohemians	Waterford
19:45 GMT	Michael O'Connor (yellow card) 45'; Robbie McCourt (yellow card) 66'	Report	Sam Bone 42' (o.g.); Danny Mandroiu 45+2' (pen.), (yellow card) 87'; Michael Barker (yellow card) 67'	Stadium: RSC; Attendance: 2,419; Referee: Paul McLaughlin

24 February 2020 Round 3	Bohemians	2—0	Sligo Rovers	Phibsborough, Dublin
19:45 GMT	Danny Mandroiu 9'; Kris Twardek (yellow card) 54', (goal) 90'; Luke Wade-Slater (yellow card) 88'	Report	Garry Buckley (yellow card) 25'; Jesse Devers (yellow card) 67'; Will Seymore (yellow card) 78'; David Cawley (yellow card) 80'	Stadium: Dalymount Park; Attendance: 2,859; Referee: Ben Connolly

28 February 2020 Round 4	Derry City	2—0	Bohemians	Derry
19:45 GMT	Stephen Mallon 63', (yellow card) 90'; Walter Figueira 90'; Adam Liddle (yellow card) 75'	Report	Dan Casey (yellow card) 10'; Anthony Breslin (yellow card) 26'; Glen McAuley (yellow card) 75'	Stadium: Ryan McBride Brandywell Stadium; Attendance: 2,850 (est.); Referee: Derek Tomney

6 March 2020 Round 5	Bohemians	2—0	Shelbourne	Phibsborough, Dublin
20:00 GMT	Andre Wright (yellow card) 28', (goal) 53'; Danny Mandroiu 62'; Kris Twardek (yellow card) 85'	Report	Ryan Brennan (yellow card) 65'; Georgie Poynton (yellow card) 86'	Stadium: Dalymount Park; Attendance: 3,560; Referee: Neil Doyle
Note: Live coverage on eir Sport. Man of the Match Kris Twardek

2 August 2020 Round 6	Cork City	0—1	Bohemians	Cork
17:00 GMT	Joseph Olowu (yellow card) 30'; Uniss Kargbo (yellow card) 63'; Kevin O’Connor (yellow card) 87'	Report	Andre Wright 4'; Andy Lyons (yellow card) 61'; Keith Buckley (yellow card) 84'	Stadium: Turners Cross; Attendance: N/A; Referee: Sean Grant
Note: Originally scheduled for 13 March 2020. Rearranged due to COVID-19 pandemic

7 August 2020 Round 7	Bohemians	2—1	Dundalk	Phibsborough, Dublin
17:45 GMT	Daniel Grant 7'; Keith Buckley 15'; Dan Casey (yellow card) 32'; Dawson Devoy (yellow card) 84'; Kris Twardek (yellow card) 86'	Report	Michael Duffy 42'	Stadium: Dalymount Park; Attendance: N/A; Referee: Neil Doyle
Note: Originally scheduled for 20 March 2020. Rearranged due to COVID-19 pandemic.

15 August 2020 Round 8	Finn Harps	0—1	Bohemians	Ballybofey
14:00 GMT	Stephen Folan (yellow card) 11'; Ryan Connolly (yellow card) 28'; Dave Webster (yellow card) 90+2'	Report	Daniel Grant 24'; Keith Ward (yellow card) 58'; Keith Buckley (yellow card) 68'; Anthony Breslin (yellow card) 90'	Stadium: Finn Park; Attendance: N/A; Referee: Ben Connolly
Note: Originally scheduled for 27 March 2020. Rearranged due to COVID-19 pandemic.

22 August 2020 Round 9	Bohemians	2—0	St Patrick's Athletic	Phibsborough, Dublin
14:00 GMT	Anthony Breslin 16', (yellow card) 82'; Daniel Grant (yellow card) 22'; Andre Wright 24'; Keith Ward (yellow card) 52'; Kris Twardek (yellow card) 66'	Report	Lee Desmond (yellow card) 19'; Robbie Benson (yellow card) 70'	Stadium: Dalymount Park; Attendance: N/A; Referee: Derek Tomney
Note: Originally scheduled for 3 April 2020. Rearranged due to COVID-19 pandemic.

5 September 2020 Round 10	Shamrock Rovers	2—0	Bohemians	Tallaght, Dublin
14:00 GMT	Daniel Lafferty 4', (yellow card) 77'; Lee Grace (yellow card) 35'; Gary O’Neill (yellow card) 77'	Report	JJ Lunney (yellow card) 29'; James Finnerty (yellow card) 32'; Keith Buckley (yellow card) 90+5'	Stadium: Tallaght Stadium; Attendance: N/A; Referee: Derek Tomney
Note: Originally scheduled for 10 April 2020. Rearranged due to COVID-19 pandemic.

11 September 2020 Round 11	Bohemians	0—2	Waterford	Phibsborough, Dublin
17:45 GMT	Kris Twardek (yellow card) 38'; Danny Mandroiu (yellow card) 42'	Report	Ali Coote 25' (yellow card) 47'; Tyreke Wilson 45'; John Martin (yellow card) 63'	Stadium: Dalymount Park; Attendance: N/A; Referee: Damien MacGraith
Note: Originally scheduled for 17 April 2020. Rearranged due to COVID-19 pandemic.

18 September 2020 Round 12	Sligo Rovers	0—1	Bohemians	Sligo
19:45 GMT	David Cawley (yellow card) 19'; Lewis Banks (yellow card) 53'; Kyle Callan-McFadden (yellow card) 67'	Report	Rob Cornwall (yellow card) 58'; Anthony Breslin (yellow card) 74'; Andre Wright 80'; Dawson Devoy (yellow card) 90+1'	Stadium: The Showgrounds; Attendance: N/A; Referee: Robert Hennessy
Note: Originally scheduled for 20 April 2020. Rearranged due to COVID-19 pandemic.

25 September 2020 Round 13	Bohemians	2—1	Derry City	Phibsborough, Dublin
19:45 GMT	Keith Ward 90+1' (pen.); Andre Wright 90+3'	Report	James Akintunde 2'; Walter Figueira (yellow card) 25'; Peter Cherrie (yellow card) 58'; Eoin Toal (yellow card) 70'; Jake Dunwoody (yellow card) 85'; Cameron McJannet (yellow card) 90+1'	Stadium: Dalymount Park; Attendance: N/A; Referee: Ben Connolly
Note: Originally scheduled for 24 April 2020. Rearranged due to COVID-19 pandemic.

3 October 2020 Round 14	Shelbourne	1—3	Bohemians	Drumcondra, Dublin
19:30 GMT	Gary Deegan (yellow card) 22'; Georgie Poynton 88'	Report	Daniel Grant 29', 72', 80'; Keith Buckley (yellow card) 67'	Stadium: Tolka Park; Attendance: N/A; Referee: Robert Harvey
Note: Originally scheduled for 27 April 2020. Rearranged due to COVID-19 pandemic.

9 October 2020 Round 15	Bohemians	3—0	Cork City	Phibsborough, Dublin
19:45 GMT	Andre Wright 16' 53'; Daniel Grant 20'; Rob Cornwall (yellow card) 38'	Report	Uniss Kargbo (yellow card) 38'; Jake O’Brien (yellow card) 38'; Gearoid Morrissey (yellow card) 80'; Henry Ochieng (yellow card) 82'	Stadium: Dalymount Park; Attendance: N/A; Referee: Seán Grant
Note: Originally scheduled for 1 May 2020. Rearranged due to COVID-19 pandemic.

16 October 2020 Round 16	Dundalk	0—0	Bohemians	Dundalk
17:50 GMT	Patrick McEleney (yellow card) 57'; Cameron Dummigan (yellow card) 89'	Report	Keith Buckley (yellow card) 90'	Stadium: Oriel Park; Attendance: N/A; Referee: Damien MacGraith
Note: Originally scheduled for 8 May 2020. Rearranged due to COVID-19 pandemic.

24 October 2020 Round 17	Bohemians	0—2	Finn Harps	Phibsborough, Dublin
19:30 GMT	Anthony Breslin (red card) 72' JJ Lunney (yellow card) 85'	Report	Mark Russell 45' 51'; Leo Donnellan (red card) 72'	Stadium: Dalymount Park; Attendance: N/A; Referee: Neil Doyle
Note: Originally scheduled for 15 May 2020. Rearranged due to COVID-19 pandemic.

8 November 2020 Round 18	St Patrick's Athletic	1-2	Bohemians	Inchicore, Dublin
19:30 GMT	Jordan Gibson 37'; Shane Griffin (yellow card) 28'; Rory Feely (yellow card) 63'; Christopher Forrester (yellow card) 64'		Daniel Grant 45'; Andre Wright 63' (pen.); JJ Lunney (yellow card) 36'	Stadium: Richmond Park; Attendance: N/A; Referee: Rob Hennessy
Note: Originally scheduled for 1 May 2020. Rearranged due to COVID-19 pandemic.

25 May 2020 Round 19	Bohemians	v	Dundalk	Phibsborough, Dublin
19:45 GMT				Stadium: Dalymount Park
Note: Game cancelled to due Coronavirus pandemic

29 May 2020 Round 20	Bohemians	v	Shamrock Rovers	Phibsborough, Dublin
19:45 GMT				Stadium: Dalymount Park
Note: Game cancelled to due Coronavirus pandemic.

5 June 2020 Round 21	Waterford	v	Bohemians	Waterford
19:45 GMT				Stadium: RSC
Note: Game cancelled to due Coronavirus pandemic.

12 June 2020 Round 22	Bohemians	v	Sligo Rovers	Phibsborough, Dublin
19:45 GMT				Stadium: Dalymount Park
Note: Game cancelled to due Coronavirus pandemic.

26 June 2020 Round 23	Derry City	v	Bohemians	Derry
19:45 GMT				Stadium: Ryan McBride Brandywell Stadium
Note: Game cancelled to due Coronavirus pandemic.

29 June 2020 Round 24	Bohemians	v	Shelbourne	Phibsborough, Dublin
19:45 GMT				Stadium: Dalymount Park
Note: Game cancelled to due Coronavirus pandemic.

3 July 2020 Round 25	Cork City	v	Bohemians	Cork
19:45 GMT				Stadium: Turners Cross
Note: Game cancelled to due Coronavirus pandemic.

17 July 2020 Round 26	Finn Harps	v	Bohemians	Ballybofey
19:45 GMT				Stadium: Finn Park
Note: Game cancelled to due Coronavirus pandemic.

24 July 2020 Round 27	Bohemians	v	St Patrick's Athletic	Phibsborough, Dublin
19:45 GMT				Stadium: Dalymount Park
Note: Game cancelled to due Coronavirus pandemic.

31 July 2020 Round 28	Shamrock Rovers	v	Bohemians	Tallaght, Dublin
19:45 GMT				Stadium: Tallaght Stadium
Note: Game cancelled to due Coronavirus pandemic.

14 August 2020 Round 29	Bohemians	v	Waterford	Phibsborough, Dublin
19:45 GMT				Stadium: Dalymount Park
Note: Game cancelled to due Coronavirus pandemic.

29 August 2020 Round 30	Sligo Rovers	v	Bohemians	Sligo
19:45 GMT				Stadium: The Showgrounds
Note: Game cancelled to due Coronavirus pandemic.

11 September 2020 Round 31	Bohemians	v	Derry City	Phibsborough, Dublin
19:45 GMT				Stadium: Dalymount Park
Note: Game cancelled to due Coronavirus pandemic.

18 September 2020 Round 32	Shelbourne	v	Bohemians	Drumcondra, Dublin
19:45 GMT				Stadium: Tolka Park
Note: Game cancelled to due Coronavirus pandemic.

2 October 2020 Round 33	Bohemians	v	Cork City	Phibsborough, Dublin
19:45 GMT				Stadium: Dalymount Park
Note: Game cancelled to due Coronavirus pandemic.

9 October 2020 Round 34	Dundalk	v	Bohemians	Dundalk
19:45 GMT				Stadium: Oriel Park
Note: Game cancelled to due Coronavirus pandemic.

16 October 2020 Round 35	Bohemians	v	Finn Harps	Phibsborough, Dublin
19:45 GMT				Stadium: Dalymount Park
Note: Game cancelled to due Coronavirus pandemic.

23 October 2020 Round 36	St Patrick's Athletic	v	Bohemians	Inchicore, Dublin
19:45 GMT				Stadium: Richmond Park
Note: Game cancelled to due Coronavirus pandemic.

=== FAI Cup ===
31 August 2020 Second Round	Bohemians	2—0	Cabinteely	Phibsborough, Dublin
19:45 GMT	Promise Omochere 32'; Dinny Corcoran 41'	Report	Paul Fox (yellow card) 21'; Alex Aspil (yellow card) 55'	Stadium: Dalymount Park; Attendance: N/A; Referee: Rob Harvey

20 November 2020 Quarter Final	Bohemians	1–4	Dundalk	Phibsborough, Dublin
19:45	Andre Wright 15' (pen.); Rob Cornwall (yellow card); Conor Levingston (yellow card) 41'; Michael Barker (yellow card) 57' (yellow-red card) 72'	Report	Michael Duffy 2'; Cameron Dummigan (yellow card) 10'; Chris Shields (yellow card) 26'; David McMillan 35' (pen.), 38'; Nathan Oduwa 87'	Stadium: Dalymount Park; Attendance: N/A; Referee: Robert Harvey
Note: Live coverage on RTÉ2

=== UEFA Europa League ===
27 August 2020 First qualifying round	Fehérvár FC (Hungary)	1—1 (a.e.t.) (4—2 p)	(Republic of Ireland) Bohemians	Székesfehérvár, Hungary
17:30 GMT	Nemanja Nikolić 37' (pen.), (yellow card) 68'	Report	Andy Lyons (yellow card) 18'; Keith Ward 22'; Daniel Grant (yellow card) 68'; James Finnerty (yellow card) 71'; Keith Buckley (yellow card) 85'	Stadium: MOL Aréna Sóstó; Attendance: N/A; Referee: Timohethos Christofi (Cyprus)
	Penalties
	Hodžić (penalty missed); Nikolov (penalty scored); Géresi (penalty scored); Stopira (penalty scored); Houri (penalty scored)		(penalty scored) Mandroiu; (penalty scored) Levingston; (penalty missed) Casey; (penalty missed) Twardek

== Statistics ==
=== Appearances and goals ===
No.	Pos.	Player	Premier Division		FAI Cup		Europa League		Total	
No.	Pos.	Player	Apps	Goals	Apps	Goals	Apps	Goals	Apps	Goals
1	GK	(Republic of Ireland) James Talbot	8	0	2	0	0	0	10	0
2	DF	(Republic of Ireland) Andy Lyons	12	0	0	0	1	0	13	0
3	DF	(Republic of Ireland) Anthony Breslin	14	1	0	0	1	0	15	1
4	DF	(Republic of Ireland) Dan Casey	15	0	1	0	1	0	17	0
5	DF	(Republic of Ireland) Rob Cornwall	13	0	1	0	1	0	15	0
7	MF	(Republic of Ireland) Danny Mandroiu	9(4)	3	0	0	1(1)	0	9(5)	3
8	MF	(Republic of Ireland) Jonathan Lunney	13 (3)	0	1	0	1	0	15 (3)	0
9	FW	(Republic of Ireland) Dinny Corcoran	5 (5)	0	1	1	0	0	6 (5)	1
10	MF	(Republic of Ireland) Keith Ward	14(6)	1	1(1)	0	1	1	16(7)	2
12	MF	(Republic of Ireland) Danny Grant	16(3)	7	1	0	1	0	18(3)	7
14	MF	(Republic of Ireland) Conor Levingston	10 (2)	0	2	0	1(1)	0	13(3)	0
15	FW	(England) Andre Wright	16(2)	8	1	1	1	0	18(3)	9
16	MF	(Republic of Ireland) Keith Buckley	16	1	1	0	1	0	18	1
18	DF	(Republic of Ireland) James Finnerty	5 (1)	0	1	0	1(1)	0	7(2)	0
19	FW	(Republic of Ireland) Glen McAuley	5 (2)	0	1(1)	0	0	0	6(3)	0
20	FW	(Republic of Ireland) Evan Ferguson	2(1)	0	1(1)	0	0	0	3(2)	0
21	MF	(Republic of Ireland) Jack Moylan	2(2)	0	1(1)	0	0	0	3(3)	0
22	DF	(Republic of Ireland) Paddy Kirk	4	0	2	0	0	0	6	0
23	DF	(Republic of Ireland) Michael Barker	7 (2)	0	1	0	0	0	8 (2)	0
25	GK	(Republic of Ireland) Stephen McGuinness	10	0	0	0	1	0	11	0
26	MF	(Republic of Ireland) Ross Tierney	8 (7)	0	1(1)	0	0	0	9 (8)	0
28	MF	(Republic of Ireland) Dawson Devoy	10 (5)	0	2	0	1(1)	0	13(6)	0
29	GK	(Republic of Ireland) Jamie Cleary	0	0	0	0	0	0	0	0
30	MF	(Republic of Ireland) Promise Omochere	5(1)	0	2	1	0	0	7(1)	1
-	FW	(Romania) Cristian Măgerușan	0	0	0	0	0	0	0	0
Players left club during season
6	DF	(Republic of Ireland) Ciaran Kelly	2(1)	0	1	0	0	0	3(1)	0
11	MF	(Canada) Kris Twardek	13	1	1	0	1	0	15	1
17	MF	(Republic of Ireland) Callum Thompson	0	0	0	0	0	0	0	0
27	MF	(Republic of Ireland) Luke Wade-Slater	3 (1)	0	1(1)	0	0	0	4(2)	0

Last updated: 20 November 2020.
Source: Competitions

=== Top scorers ===
No.	Pos.	Player	Premier Division	FAI Cup	Europa League	Total
15	FW	(England) Andre Wright	8	1	0	9
12	MF	(Republic of Ireland) Daniel Grant	7	0	0	7
7	MF	(Republic of Ireland) Danny Mandroiu	3	0	0	3
10	MF	(Republic of Ireland) Keith Ward	1	0	1	2
16	MF	(Republic of Ireland) Keith Buckley	1	0	0	1
11	MF	(Canada) Kris Twardek	1	0	0	1
3	DF	(Republic of Ireland) Anthony Breslin	1	0	0	1
30	MF	(Republic of Ireland) Promise Omochere	0	1	0	1
9	FW	(Republic of Ireland) Dinny Corcoran	0	1	0	1
Own goal			1	0	0	1
Total			23	3	1	27

Last updated: 20 November 2020.
Source: Competitions

=== Hat tricks ===
Player	Against	Result	Date	Competition
(Republic of Ireland) Daniel Grant	Shelbourne	1–3 (A)	3 October 2020	Premier Division

=== Clean sheets ===
No.	Pos.	Player	Premier Division	FAI Cup	Europa League	Total
25	GK	(Republic of Ireland) Stephen McGuinness	6/10	0	0/1	6/11
1	GK	(Republic of Ireland) James Talbot	3/8	1/2	0	4/10
29	GK	(Republic of Ireland) Jamie Cleary	0	0	0	0
Total			9/18	1/2	0/1	10/21

Last updated: 20 November 2020.
Source: Competitions

=== Discipline ===
No.	Pos.	Player	Premier Division			FAI Cup			Europa League			Total		
No.	Pos.	Player	Booked	(yellow card) (yellow-red card)	Sent off (straight red)	Booked	(yellow card) (yellow-red card)	Sent off (straight red)	Booked	(yellow card) (yellow-red card)	Sent off (straight red)	Booked	(yellow card) (yellow-red card)	Sent off (straight red)
1	GK	(Republic of Ireland) James Talbot	0	0	0	0	0	0	0	0	0	0	0	0
2	DF	(Republic of Ireland) Andy Lyons	1	1	0	0	0	0	1	0	0	2	1	0
3	DF	(Republic of Ireland) Anthony Breslin	4	0	1	0	0	0	0	0	0	4	0	1
4	DF	(Republic of Ireland) Dan Casey	2	0	0	0	0	0	0	0	0	2	0	0
5	DF	(Republic of Ireland) Rob Cornwall	2	0	0	1	0	0	0	0	0	3	0	0
6	DF	(Republic of Ireland) Ciaran Kelly†	0	0	0	0	0	0	0	0	0	0	0	0
7	MF	(Republic of Ireland) Danny Mandroiu	3	0	0	0	0	0	0	0	0	3	0	0
8	MF	(Republic of Ireland) Jonathan Lunney	3	0	0	0	0	0	0	0	0	3	0	0
9	FW	(Republic of Ireland) Dinny Corcoran	0	0	0	0	0	0	0	0	0	0	0	0
10	MF	(Republic of Ireland) Keith Ward	2	0	0	0	0	0	0	0	0	2	0	0
11	MF	(Canada) Kris Twardek	5	0	0	0	0	0	0	0	0	5	0	0
12	MF	(Republic of Ireland) Daniel Grant	1	0	0	0	0	0	1	0	0	2	0	0
14	MF	(Republic of Ireland) Conor Levingston	0	0	0	1	0	0	0	0	0	1	0	0
15	FW	(England) Andre Wright	1	0	0	0	0	0	0	0	0	1	0	0
16	MF	(Republic of Ireland) Keith Buckley	6	0	0	0	0	0	1	0	0	7	0	0
17	MF	(Republic of Ireland) Callum Thompson †	0	0	0	0	0	0	0	0	0	0	0	0
18	DF	(Republic of Ireland) James Finnerty	2	0	0	0	0	0	1	0	0	3	0	0
19	FW	(Republic of Ireland) Glen McAuley	1	0	0	0	0	0	0	0	0	1	0	0
20	FW	(Republic of Ireland) Evan Ferguson	0	0	0	0	0	0	0	0	0	0	0	0
21	MF	(Republic of Ireland) Jack Moylan	0	0	0	0	0	0	0	0	0	0	0	0
22	DF	(Republic of Ireland) Paddy Kirk	0	0	0	0	0	0	0	0	0	0	0	0
23	DF	(Republic of Ireland) Michael Barker	1	0	0	1	1	0	0	0	0	2	1	0
25	GK	(Republic of Ireland) Stephen McGuinness	0	0	0	0	0	0	0	0	0	0	0	0
26	MF	(Republic of Ireland) Ross Tierney	0	0	0	0	0	0	0	0	0	0	0	0
27	MF	(Republic of Ireland) Luke Wade-Slater	2	0	0	0	0	0	0	0	0	2	0	0
28	MF	(Republic of Ireland) Dawson Devoy	2	0	0	0	0	0	0	0	0	2	0	0
29	GK	(Republic of Ireland) Jamie Cleary	0	0	0	0	0	0	0	0	0	0	0	0
30	MF	(Nigeria) Promise Omochere	0	0	0	0	0	0	0	0	0	0	0	0
-	FW	(Romania) Cristian Magerusan	0	0	0	0	0	0	0	0	0	0	0	0
Total			34	1	1	3	1	0	4	0	0	41	2	1

Last updated: 20 November 2020.
Source: Competitions

† Player out on loan

=== Captains ===
No.	Pos.	Player	No. Games	Notes
16	MF	(Republic of Ireland) Keith Buckley	19	Captain
5	DF	(Republic of Ireland) Robert Cornwall	1	Vice-Captain
23	DF	(Republic of Ireland) Michael Barker	1	

Last updated: 20 November 2020
Source: Competitive match reports.
Competitive matches only
Matches started as captain only
Country: FIFA nationality; No.: Squad number; P: Position; Name: Player name; No. Games: Number of games started as captain.

== International call-ups ==
=== Canada Under 23 National Team ===
Player	Fixture	Date	Location	Event
Kris Twardek
Kris Twardek	vs. El Salvador	21 March 2020	Guadalajara, Mexico	2020 CONCACAF Men's Olympic Qualifying Championship
Kris Twardek	vs. Haiti	24 March 2020	Zapopan, Mexico	2020 CONCACAF Men's Olympic Qualifying Championship
Kris Twardek	vs. Honduras	27 March 2020	Guadalajara, Mexico	2020 CONCACAF Men's Olympic Qualifying Championship

=== Republic of Ireland Under 21 National Team ===
Player	Fixture	Date	Location	Event
Danny Mandroiu
Danny Mandroiu	vs. Italy	13 October 2020	Ferrara, Italy	2021 UEFA European Under-21 Championship qualification
Danny Mandroiu	vs. Iceland	15 November 2020	Dublin, Ireland	2021 UEFA European Under-21 Championship qualification
Danny Mandroiu	vs. Luxembourg	18 November 2020	Esch-sur-Alzette, Luxembourg	2021 UEFA European Under-21 Championship qualification
Daniel Grant
Daniel Grant	vs. Italy	13 October 2020	Ferrara, Italy	2021 UEFA European Under-21 Championship qualification
Daniel Grant	vs. Iceland	15 November 2020	Dublin, Ireland	
Daniel Grant	vs. Luxembourg	18 November 2020	Esch-sur-Alzette, Luxembourg	2021 UEFA European Under-21 Championship qualification

== Awards ==
No.	Pos.	Player	Award	Source
11	MF	Kris Twardek	Bohemian FC Player of the Month February	
11	MF	Kris Twardek	Bohemian FC Player of the Month August	
29	MF	Dawson Devoy	Bohemian FC Player of the Month September	
12	MF	Daniel Grant	SWAI League Of Ireland Player of the Month August	
2	DF	Andy Lyons	PFAI Team of the Year	
16	MF	Keith Buckley	PFAI Team of the Year	
12	MF	Daniel Grant	PFAI Team of the Year	
15	FW	Andre Wright	PFAI Team of the Year	
12	MF	Daniel Grant	PFAI Young Player of the Year	

== Transfers ==
=== In ===
No.	Pos.	Player	From	Date	Fee	Source
Winter
25	GK	(Republic of Ireland) Stephen McGuinness	(Republic of Ireland) Cabinteely	1 January 2020	Free	
11	LW	(Canada) Kris Twardek	(Republic of Ireland) Sligo Rovers	1 January 2020	Free	
8	DM	(Republic of Ireland) Jonathan Lunney	(Republic of Ireland) Waterford	1 January 2020	Free	
3	LB	(Republic of Ireland) Anthony Breslin	(Republic of Ireland) Longford Town	1 January 2020	Free	
19	ST	(Republic of Ireland) Glen McAuley	(Republic of Ireland) St. Patrick's Athletic	1 January 2020	Free	
4	CB	(Republic of Ireland) Dan Casey	(Republic of Ireland) Cork City	1 January 2020	Undisclosed	
6	CB	(Republic of Ireland) Ciaran Kelly	(Republic of Ireland) St Patrick's Athletic	16 January 2020	Undisclosed	
Summer
17	RW	(Republic of Ireland) Callum Thompson	(England) Wolverhampton Wanderers U23	1 July 2020	Undisclosed	

=== Loan in ===
No.	Pos.	Player	From	Starts	Ends	Fee	Ref
Winter
17	RW	(Republic of Ireland) Callum Thompson	(England) Wolverhampton Wanderers U23	31 January 2020	30 June 2020	Undisclosed	

=== Out ===
Pos.	Player	To	Date	Fee	Source
GK	(Republic of Ireland) Michael Kelly	(Republic of Ireland) Cabinteely	4 February 2020	N/A	
LW	(Republic of Ireland) Kevin Devaney	Released	1 January 2020	N/A	
RB	(Republic of Ireland) Derek Pender	Retired	1 January 2020	N/A	
LB	(Republic of Ireland) Darragh Leahy	(Republic of Ireland) Dundalk	1 January 2020	Free	
CM	(Scotland) Scott Allardice	(Republic of Ireland) Waterford	1 January 2020	Free	
FW	(Republic of Ireland) Ryan Swan	(Northern Ireland) Warrenpoint Town	8 January 2020	Free	
LM	(Republic of Ireland) Ryan Graydon	(Republic of Ireland) Bray Wanderers	3 February 2020	Free	
LM	(Canada) Kris Twardek	(Poland) Jagiellonia Bialystok	5 October 2020	€40,000	
RM	(Republic of Ireland) Luke Wade-Slater	(Northern Ireland) Larne	5 October 2020	N/A	

=== Loan out ===
No.	Pos.	Player	To	Starts	Ends	Fee	Ref
Summer
17	RW	(Republic of Ireland) Callum Thompson	(Republic of Ireland) Bray Wanderers	24 July 2020	31 December 2020	Undisclosed	
6	CB	(Republic of Ireland) Ciaran Kelly	(Northern Ireland) Ballymena United	1 October 2020	31 December 2020	Undisclosed	
