= 2020 League of Ireland Premier Division =

League of Ireland Premier Division
- Season: 2020
- Dates: 14 February 2020 – 9 November 2020
- Champions: Shamrock Rovers (18th title)
- Relegated: Cork City, Shelbourne
- Champions League: Shamrock Rovers
- Europa Conference League: Bohemians; Dundalk; Sligo Rovers
- Matches: 90
- Goals: 198 (2.2 per match)
- Top goalscorer: Patrick Hoban (10 goals)
- Biggest home win: Shamrock Rovers 6–0 Cork City (21 February 2020)
- Biggest away win: Dundalk F.C 0-4 Shamrock Rovers (27 September 2020)
- Highest scoring: Shamrock Rovers 6–1 Waterford (21 September 2020)
- Longest winning run: Shamrock Rovers (7 games)
- Longest unbeaten run: Shamrock Rovers (7 games)
- Longest winless run: Finn Harps (7 games)
- Longest losing run: Finn Harps (5 games)
- Highest attendance: 7,522
- Total attendance: 65,700 (Note: Total attendance and average attendance figures only account for the first four weeks of the season after which no spectators were allowed due to the COVID-19 pandemic)
- Average attendance: 2,986
- All statistics correct as of 10 November 2020.

The 2020 League of Ireland Premier Division, known as the SSE Airtricity League for sponsorship reasons, was the 36th season of the League of Ireland Premier Division.

The league began on 14 February 2020 and concluded on 9 November 2020. The fixtures were announced on 20 December 2019. The season was halted in mid-March because of the COVID-19 pandemic in the Republic of Ireland following the directive of the Irish government and the Football Association of Ireland. The FAI subsequently announced a contingency plan with a view to completing the domestic season at a later date with a reduced number of games. It resumed on 31 July. On 24 October, Finn Harps won 2–0 at Bohemians which meant Shamrock Rovers won the league and Cork City were relegated.

== Overview ==
The Premier Division consists of 10 teams. Ordinarily each team plays each other four times for a total of 36 matches in the season. Following a meeting of the Football Association of Ireland regarding the COVID-19 pandemic, it was decided that the season would be played on an 18-match basis with teams playing each other twice: once at home and once away.

Shelbourne, the 2019 First Division champions, were promoted to the league for the first time since 2013, replacing fellow Dublin side UCD, who were relegated to the League of Ireland First Division after finishing bottom of the league in 2019.

== Teams ==
=== Stadia and locations ===
Locations of Premier Division teams
Locations of Dublin Premier Division teams

Team	Location	Stadium	Capacity
Bohemians	Dublin (Phibsborough)	Dalymount Park	3,640
Cork City	Cork	Turners Cross	7,845
Derry City	Derry	Brandywell Stadium	3,700
Dundalk	Dundalk	Oriel Park	4,500
Finn Harps	Ballybofey	Finn Park	6,000
St Patrick's Athletic	Dublin (Inchicore)	Richmond Park	5,340
Shamrock Rovers	Dublin (Tallaght)	Tallaght Stadium	8,000
Shelbourne	Dublin (Drumcondra)	Tolka Park	3,700
Sligo Rovers	Sligo	The Showgrounds	5,500
Waterford	Waterford	Regional Sports Centre	5,500

=== Personnel and kits ===
Note: Flags indicate national team as has been defined under FIFA eligibility rules. Players may hold more than one non-FIFA nationality.

Team	Manager	Captain	Kit manufacturer	Shirt sponsor
Bohemians	(Republic of Ireland) Keith Long	(Republic of Ireland) Keith Buckley	O'Neills	Des Kelly Interiors
Cork City	(Republic of Ireland) Colin Healy	(Republic of Ireland) Gearoid Morrissey	Adidas	University College Cork
Derry City	(Northern Ireland) Declan Devine	(Republic of Ireland) Conor McCormack	Adidas	Diamond Corrugated
Dundalk	(Italy) Filippo Giovagnoli	(Republic of Ireland) Brian Gartland	Umbro	Fyffes
Finn Harps	(Republic of Ireland) Ollie Horgan	(Republic of Ireland) Gareth Harkin	Joma	KN Group
St Patrick's Athletic	(Republic of Ireland) Stephen O'Donnell	(Republic of Ireland) Ian Bermingham	Umbro	MIG Insurance Brokers
Shamrock Rovers	(Republic of Ireland) Stephen Bradley	(Republic of Ireland) Ronan Finn	Umbro	JD Sports
Shelbourne	(Republic of Ireland) Ian Morris	(Republic of Ireland) Lorcan Fitzgerald	Umbro	FLYEfit
Sligo Rovers	(Republic of Ireland) Liam Buckley	(Republic of Ireland) Kyle Callan-McFadden	Joma	Avantcard
Waterford	(Republic of Ireland) Fran Rockett	(Republic of Ireland) Brian Murphy	Umbro	24/7 Cardiac Care

=== Managerial changes ===
Team	Outgoing manager	Manner of departure	Date of vacancy	Position in table	Incoming manager	Date of appointment
Waterford	(Republic of Ireland) Alan Reynolds	Resigned	16 June 2020	6th	(Republic of Ireland) John Sheridan	8 July 2020
Dundalk	(Republic of Ireland) Vinny Perth	Sacked	20 August 2020	3rd	(Italy) Filippo Giovagnoli	25 August 2020
Waterford	(Republic of Ireland) John Sheridan	Moved to Wigan Athletic	11 September 2020	4th	(Republic of Ireland) Fran Rockett	24 September 2020
Cork City	(England) Neale Fenn	Resigned	8 October 2020	10th	(Republic of Ireland) Colin Healy (Note: Healy was initially appointed as caretaker manager until the end of the season. He was made permanent manager on 24 December 2020.)	9 October 2020

== League table ==
=== Standings ===
Pos	Team	Pld	W	D	L	GF	GA	GD	Pts	Qualification or relegation
1	Shamrock Rovers (C)	18	15	3	0	44	7	+37	48	Qualification for Champions League first qualifying round
2	Bohemians	18	12	1	5	23	12	+11	37	Qualification for Europa Conference League first qualifying round (Note: Since the winners of the 2020 FAI Cup (Dundalk) qualified for European competition based on their league position, the final spot awarded to the Cup winner passed to the next best-placed team, i.e. fourth-placed team.)
3	Dundalk	18	7	5	6	25	23	+2	26	Qualification for Europa Conference League first qualifying round
4	Sligo Rovers	18	8	1	9	19	23	−4	25	Qualification for Europa Conference League first qualifying round
5	Waterford	18	7	3	8	17	22	−5	24	
6	St Patrick's Athletic	18	5	6	7	14	17	−3	21	
7	Derry City	18	5	5	8	18	18	0	20	
8	Finn Harps	18	5	5	8	15	24	−9	20	
9	Shelbourne (R)	18	5	4	9	13	22	−9	19	Qualification for relegation play-offs
10	Cork City (R)	18	2	5	11	10	30	−20	11	Relegation to League of Ireland First Division

Source: SSE Airtricity League, Soccerway
Rules for classification: 1) Points; 2) Goal difference; 3) Goals scored.
(C) Champions; (R) Relegated

=== Positions by round ===
The table lists the positions of teams after each week of matches. In order to preserve chronological evolvements, any postponed matches are not included in the round at which they were originally scheduled but added to the full round they were played immediately afterward.

Team ╲ Round	1	2	3	4	5	6	7	8	9	10	11	12	13	14	15	16	17	18
Bohemians	6	4	3	3	3	3	2	2	2	2	2	2	2	2	2	2	2	2
Cork City	7	10	10	9	9	10	10	9	10	9	10	10	10	10	10	10	10	10
Derry City	8	8	8	5	7	7	7	8	5	7	6	6	6	7	6	7	7	7
Dundalk	1	2	2	2	2	2	3	3	3	4	3	3	4	6	3	3	3	3
Finn Harps	2	3	4	6	8	8	9	10	9	10	9	9	9	9	9	9	9	8
Shamrock Rovers	3	1	1	1	1	1	1	1	1	1	1	1	1	1	1	1	1	1
Shelbourne	4	6	6	4	5	6	6	6	7	6	7	8	8	8	8	8	8	9
Sligo Rovers	9	9	9	10	10	9	8	7	4	3	5	5	5	5	5	5	5	4
St Patrick's Athletic	10	5	5	7	4	5	4	4	6	8	8	7	7	4	7	7	6	6
Waterford	5	7	7	8	6	4	5	5	8	5	4	4	3	3	4	4	4	5

Source: Extratime.com
= Leader and UEFA Champions League first qualifying round; = UEFA Conference League first qualifying round; = Qualification to the Relegation play-offs; = Relegation to the League of Ireland First Division

== Results ==
Teams will play each other twice (once at home, once away).

Home \ Away	BOH	COR	DER	DUN	FHA	STP	SHM	SHE	SLI	WAT
Bohemians	—	3–0	2–1	2–1	0–2	2–0	0–1	2–0	2–0	0–2
Cork City	0–1	—	1–1	0–2	1–0	1–2	0–3	0–1	3–0	0–0
Derry City	2–0	3–1	—	1–2	1–1	0–0	1–2	2–0	0–2	2–0
Dundalk	0–0	3–0	1–0	—	0–0	1–1	0–4	3–2	0–2	2–2
Finn Harps	0–1	1–1	0–0	0–4	—	3–2	0–2	0–1	1–0	1–0
St Patrick's Athletic	1–2	1–0	0–2	1–1	2–0	—	0–0	2–0	0–0	0–1
Shamrock Rovers	1–0	6–0	2–0	3–2	3–1	0–0	—	0–0	4–0	6–1
Shelbourne	1–3	1–1	1–1	1–2	1–1	1–0	0–2	—	1–0	0–1
Sligo Rovers	0–1	2–1	1–0	3–1	3–1	0–2	2–3	2–1	—	2–1
Waterford	0–2	0–0	2–1	1–0	2–3	3–0	0–2	0–1	1–0	—

Source: SSE Airtricity League, Extratime.com
Legend: Blue = home team win; Yellow = draw; Red = away team win.
For upcoming matches, an "a" indicates there is an article about the rivalry between the two participants.

== Season statistics ==
=== Top scorers ===
Rank	Player	Club	Goals
1	(Republic of Ireland) Patrick Hoban	Dundalk	10
2	(Republic of Ireland) Jack Byrne	Shamrock Rovers	9
3	(Republic of Ireland) Graham Burke	Shamrock Rovers	8
3	(England) Andre Wright	Bohemians	8
5	(Republic of Ireland) Daniel Grant	Bohemians	7
5	(Republic of Ireland) Aaron Greene	Shamrock Rovers	7
7	(Republic of Ireland) Ronan Coughlan	Sligo Rovers	6

Last updated: 6 November 2020.
Source: Extratime.com

=== Hat-tricks ===
Player	For	Against	Result	Date	Goals
(Republic of Ireland) Graham Burke	Shamrock Rovers	Cork City	6–0	21 February 2020	5
(Republic of Ireland) Daniel Grant	Bohemians	Shelbourne	1–3	3 October 2020	3

== Play-offs ==
=== First Division play-off Semi-finals ===
31 October 2020	Bray Wanderers	0–1	Galway United	Carlisle Grounds
15:00			Wilson Waweru 86'	Attendance: 0 (Behind closed doors)

31 October 2020	UCD	2–3 (a.e.t.)	Longford Town	UCD Bowl
15:00	Colm Whelan 18'; Yousef Mahdy 110'		Joe Gorman 90'; Joe Gorman 113'; Dean Byrne 120'	Attendance: 0 (Behind closed doors)

=== First Division play-off Final ===
6 November 2020	Galway United	1–2	Longford Town	UCD Bowl
19:45	Killian Brouder 88'	Report	Karl Chambers 43'; Aodh Dervin 82'	Attendance: 0 (Behind closed doors); Referee: Mark Moynihan

=== Promotion/relegation play-off ===
15 November 2020	Shelbourne	0–1	Longford Town	Richmond Park
14:30		Report	Rob Manley 46'	Attendance: 0 Referee: Neil Doyle

== Awards ==
=== Monthly awards ===
Month	Player of the Month		References
Month	Player	Club	References
February	(Republic of Ireland) Jack Byrne	Shamrock Rovers	
August	(Republic of Ireland) Daniel Grant	Bohemians	
September	(Republic of Ireland) Jack Byrne	Shamrock Rovers	
October	(Republic of Ireland) Sean Murray	Dundalk	
November	(Republic of Ireland) David McMillan	Dundalk	

=== Annual awards ===
Award	Winner	Club
PFAI Player of the Year	(Republic of Ireland) Jack Byrne	Shamrock Rovers
PFAI Young Player of the Year	(Republic of Ireland) Daniel Grant	Bohemians
PFAI Premier Division Manager of the Year	(Republic of Ireland) Stephen Bradley	Shamrock Rovers

PFAI Team of the Year
Goalkeeper	(Northern Ireland) Alan Mannus (Shamrock Rovers)			
Defenders	(Republic of Ireland) Andy Lyons (Bohemians)	(Cape Verde) Roberto Lopes (Shamrock Rovers)	(Republic of Ireland) Lee Grace (Shamrock Rovers)	(Republic of Ireland) Tyreke Wilson (Waterford)
Midfielders	(Republic of Ireland) Keith Buckley (Bohemians)	(Republic of Ireland) Aaron McEneff (Shamrock Rovers)		(Republic of Ireland) Jack Byrne (Shamrock Rovers)
Forwards	(Republic of Ireland) Daniel Grant (Bohemians)	(England) Andre Wright (Bohemians)		(Republic of Ireland) Michael Duffy (Dundalk)

== See also ==
- 2020 League of Ireland First Division
- 2020 FAI Cup
- 2020 League of Ireland Cup
- 2020 Bohemian F.C. season
- 2020 Dundalk F.C. season
- 2020 Galway United F.C. season
- 2020 Shelbourne F.C. season
- 2020 St Patrick's Athletic F.C. season
