= 2018 Bohemian F.C. season =

Irish football club season

Bohemian F.C.
2018 season
- Manager: Keith Long
- Stadium: Dalymount Park, Phibsborough, Dublin 7
- Premier Division: 6th
- FAI Cup: Semi Final (vs. Cork City)
- EA Sports Cup: Quarter Final (vs. Dundalk)
- Leinster Senior Cup: Fourth Round (vs. Dundalk)
- Scottish Challenge Cup: Quarter Final (vs. East Fife)
- Top goalscorer: League: Dinny Corcoran (11); All: Dinny Corcoran (16)
- Highest home attendance: 3,640 (vs. Shamrock Rovers, 16 February 2018, Premier Division)
- Lowest home attendance: 314 (vs. U.C.D., 2 April 2018, EA Sports Cup)
Home colours	Away colours

The 2018 season was Bohemian F.C.'s 128th year in existence as a football club. The club participated in the League of Ireland Premier Division, the FAI Cup, the EA Sports Cup and was also involved in the 2018–19 Scottish Challenge Cup known as the IRN-BRU Cup.

== Club ==
=== Kits ===
The club's traditional red and black stripes were provided by Hummel this season. On 25 May 2018, the club announced a special edition jersey for the remarkable FAI Cup run. The mainly white shirt featured a red and black diagonal stripe, which had the name of every supporter, who bought the jersey woven into the fabric.

Supplier: Hummel / Sponsor: Mr Green

=== Management team ===
Position	Name
Head coach	(Republic of Ireland) Keith Long
Assistant head coach	(Republic of Ireland) Trevor Croly
Strength & Conditioning coach	(Republic of Ireland) Graham Norton
Goalkeeper coach	(Scotland) Chris Bennion

== Players ==
No.	Player	Nat.	Pos.	Date of birth (age)	Since	Last club
Goalkeepers
1	Shane Supple	(Republic of Ireland)	GK	4 May 1987 (age 39)	2016	(Republic of Ireland) Crumlin United
25	Colin McCabe	(Republic of Ireland)	GK	6 January 1997 (age 29)	2017	(Scotland) Celtic U20
30	Sean Bohan	(Republic of Ireland)	GK	12 March 2001 (age 25)	2018	(Republic of Ireland) Bohemian U19
Defenders
2	Derek Pender (C)	(Republic of Ireland)	RB	2 October 1984 (age 41)	2012	(Republic of Ireland) St Patrick's Athletic
3	Darragh Leahy	(Republic of Ireland)	LB	15 April 1998 (age 28)	2018	(England) Coventry City
4	Dan Casey	(Republic of Ireland)	CB	29 October 1997 (age 28)	2017	(England) Sunderland U23
5	Rob Cornwall	(Republic of Ireland)	CB	16 October 1994 (age 31)	2017	(Republic of Ireland) Shamrock Rovers
6	Dan Byrne	(Republic of Ireland)	CB	7 May 1993 (age 33)	2013	(Republic of Ireland) Kilbarrack United
23	Paddy Kirk	(Republic of Ireland)	LB	2 June 1998 (age 28)	2018	(Republic of Ireland) Bohemian U19
29	Andy Lyons	(Republic of Ireland)	RB	2 August 2000 (age 26)	2018	(Republic of Ireland) Bohemian U19
Midfielders
10	Keith Ward	(Republic of Ireland)	AM	12 October 1990 (age 35)	2017	(Republic of Ireland) Derry City
11	Kevin Devaney	(Republic of Ireland)	LW	26 September 1990 (age 35)	2018	(Republic of Ireland) Galway United
12	Daniel Grant	(Republic of Ireland)	RW	23 October 2000 (age 25)	2018	(Republic of Ireland) Bohemian U19
15	Oscar Brennan	(Republic of Ireland)	CM	17 March 1996 (age 30)	2017	(Republic of Ireland) Cabinteely
16	Keith Buckley	(Republic of Ireland)	CM	17 June 1992 (age 34)	2018	(Republic of Ireland) Bray Wanderers
18	Ian Morris	(Republic of Ireland)	CM	27 February 1987 (age 39)	2016	(Northern Ireland) Glenavon
19	Jonathan Lunney	(Republic of Ireland)	DM	2 February 1998 (age 28)	2018	(Republic of Ireland) St Patrick's Athletic
27	Daniel Kelly	(Republic of Ireland)	RW	21 May 1996 (age 30)	2018	(Republic of Ireland) Bray Wanderers
8	Robbie McCourt	(Republic of Ireland)	DM	6 April 1998 (age 28)	2018	(England) West Brom U23
Forwards
9	Dinny Corcoran	(Republic of Ireland)	CF	13 February 1989 (age 37)	2017	(Republic of Ireland) St Patrick's Athletic
28	Eoghan Stokes	(Republic of Ireland)	CF	17 May 1996 (age 30)	2018	(England) Leeds United U23
24	Ryan Swan	(Republic of Ireland)	CF	13 May 1996 (age 30)	2018	(Republic of Ireland) Cabinteely
17	Cristian Magerusan	(Romania)	CF	16 September 1999 (age 26)	2017	(Republic of Ireland) Bohemian U19
14	Ryan Masterson	(Republic of Ireland)	CF	23 October 1996 (age 29)	2018	(Republic of Ireland) Drogheda United

Last updated: 2 September 2018.
Source: Extratime

== Squad statistics ==
=== Appearances and goals ===
As of 2 November 2018. Players in italics have left the club during the season.

No.	Pos.	Nat.	Name	Premier Division		FAI Cup		EA Sports Cup		IRN BRU Cup		Total	
No.	Pos.	Nat.	Name	Apps	Goals	Apps	Goals	Apps	Goals	Apps	Goals	Apps	Goals
1	GK	IRE	Shane Supple	33	0	5	0	1	0	1	0	40	0
2	DF	IRE	Derek Pender	19	1	5	0	0	0	1(1)	0	25(1)	1
3	DF	IRE	Darragh Leahy	23(1)	1	5	1	0	0	0	0	28(1)	2
4	DF	IRE	Dan Casey	31	3	4	1	1	0	0	0	36	4
5	DF	IRE	Rob Cornwall	24(2)	3	1(1)	0	0	0	2	0	27(3)	3
6	DF	IRE	Daniel Byrne	12(11)	1	1(2)	0	2	0	2	0	17(13)	1
7*	MF	IRE	Karl Moore	7(4)	0	0	0	0	0	0	0	7(4)	0
8*	MF	IRE	Philip Gannon	3(5)	0	0	0	3	0	0	0	6(5)	0
8	MF	IRE	Robbie McCourt	3	1	0	0	0	0	2	0	5	1
9	FW	IRE	Daniel Corcoran	24(7)	11	5	5	0	0	1(1)	0	30(8)	16
10	MF	IRE	Keith Ward	25(6)	2	5	1	1	0	0	0	31(6)	3
11	MF	IRE	Kevin Devaney	19(7)	5	5	0	0	0	2	1	26(7)	6
12	MF	IRE	Daniel Grant	8(12)	3	1(2)	0	2	2	0	0	11(14)	5
14*	MF	IRE	Patrick Kavanagh	11(5)	1	0	0	1	0	0	0	12(5)	1
14	FW	IRE	Ryan Masterson	0(1)	0	0(1)	0	0	0	0	0	0(2)	0
15	MF	IRE	Oscar Brennan	22(3)	0	0(1)	0	1	0	1(1)	0	24(5)	0
16	MF	IRE	Keith Buckley	29	1	5	0	0	0	1(1)	0	35(1)	1
17	FW	ROM	Cristian Magerusan	1(3)	2	0(1)	1	0	0	0(1)	0	1(5)	3
18	MF	IRL	Ian Morris	22(6)	1	4	1	0	0	0	0	26(6)	2
19	MF	IRL	Jonathan Lunney	17(4)	2	5	1	3	1	1	0	26(4)	4
21	MF	IRL	Jamie Hamilton	1(1)	0	0	0	3	0	0	0	4(1)	0
22*	MF	IRL	John Ross Wilson	0	0	0	0	2	0	0	0	2	0
23	DF	IRL	Patrick Kirk	9(1)	0	0(1)	0	3	0	1(1)	0	13(3)	0
24	FW	IRL	Ryan Swan	0	0	0	0	0	0	0	0	0	0
25	GK	IRL	Colin McCabe	3	0	0	0	2	0	1	0	6	0
26*	MF	IRL	Dylan Watts	16(4)	1	0	0	2	2	0	0	18(4)	3
26	MF	IRL	Promise Omochere	0(2)	0	0	0	0(1)	0	0	0	0(3)	0
27*	FW	IRL	Rob Manley	1(2)	0	0	0	3	1	0	0	4(2)	1
27	MF	IRL	Daniel Kelly	9(1)	5	4	1	0	0	1	0	14(1)	6
28	MF	IRL	Eoghan Stokes	18(13)	5	0(4)	2	2	1	2	0	22(17)	8
29	DF	IRL	Andy Lyons	4	0	0	0	1	0	1	0	6	0
30	GK	IRL	Sean Bohan	0	0	0	0	0	0	0	0	0	0
31	FW	IRL	Ali Reghba	1	2	0(1)	0	0	0	1	0	2(1)	2
32	FW	IRL	Ryan Graydon	1	0	0	0	2	0	1	0	3	0
	FW	IRL	Steven Nolan	0	0	0	0	0(1)	0	0	0	0(1)	0
	MF	IRL	Luke Nolan	0	0	0	0	0(1)	0	0	0	0(1)	0
	MF	IRL	Dylan Thornton	0	0	0	0	0(3)	0	0	0	0(3)	0

=== Goalscorers ===
As of 2 November 2018

Rank	Position	Name	SSE Airtricity League	FAI Cup	EA Sports Cup	IRN-BRU Cup	Total
1	FW	(Republic of Ireland) Daniel Corcoran	11	5	0	0	16
2	FW	(Republic of Ireland) Eoghan Stokes	5	2	1	0	8
3	MF	(Republic of Ireland) Daniel Kelly	5	1	0	0	6
3	MF	(Republic of Ireland) Kevin Devaney	5	0	0	1	6
4	MF	(Republic of Ireland) Daniel Grant	3	0	2	0	5
5	DF	(Republic of Ireland) Dan Casey	3	1	0	0	4
5	MF	(Republic of Ireland) Jonathan Lunney	2	1	1	0	4
6	DF	(Republic of Ireland) Rob Cornwall	3	0	0	0	3
6	MF	(Republic of Ireland) Keith Ward	2	1	0	0	3
6	FW	(Romania) Cristian Magerusan	2	1	0	0	3
6	MF	(Republic of Ireland) Dylan Watts	1	0	2	0	3
7	MF	(Republic of Ireland) Ian Morris	1	1	0	0	2
7	DF	(Republic of Ireland) Darragh Leahy	1	1	0	0	2
7	FW	(Republic of Ireland) Ali Reghba	2	0	0	0	2
8	MF	(Republic of Ireland) Keith Buckley	1	0	0	0	1
8	DF	(Republic of Ireland) Daniel Byrne	1	0	0	0	1
8	DF	(Republic of Ireland) Derek Pender	1	0	0	0	1
8	MF	(Republic of Ireland) Robert McCourt	1	0	0	0	1
8	MF	(Republic of Ireland) Paddy Kavanagh	1	0	0	0	1
8	FW	(Republic of Ireland) Rob Manley	0	0	1	0	1
Own goals			1	0	0	0	1
Total			52	14	7	1	74

== Competitions ==
=== Premier Division ===
==== League table ====
Pos	Team	Pld	W	D	L	GF	GA	GD	Pts	Qualification or relegation
4	Waterford	36	18	5	13	52	44	+8	59	
5	St Patrick's Athletic	36	15	5	16	51	47	+4	50	Qualification for Europa League first qualifying round (Note: Since the winners of the 2018 FAI Cup, Dundalk, qualified for European competition based on their league position, the spot awarded to the Cup winner (Europa League first qualifying round) would normally pass to the next best-placed team (the fourth-placed team). However, as Waterford were adjudged by UEFA to have not passed the "three-year rule" as they were reformed in 2016, the spot was passed to the fifth-placed team.)
6	Bohemians	36	13	9	14	52	45	+7	48	
7	Sligo Rovers	36	12	6	18	38	50	−12	42	
8	Derry City	36	13	3	20	47	70	−23	42	

Source: SSE Airtricity League, Soccerway
Rules for classification: 1) Points; 2) Goal difference; 3) Goals scored.

==== Results summary ====
Overall								Home						Away					
Pld	W	D	L	GF	GA	GD	Pts	W	D	L	GF	GA	GD	W	D	L	GF	GA	GD
36	13	9	14	52	45	+7	48	6	4	8	27	23	+4	7	5	6	25	22	+3

Last updated: 2 November 2018.
Source: LiveScore

==== Results by matchday ====
Matchday	1	2	3	4	5	6	7	8	9	10	11	12	13	14	15	16	17	18	19	20	21	22	23	24	25	26	27	28	29	30	31	32	33	34	35	36
Ground	H	A	H	H	A	H	A	H	A	H	A	A	A	A	H	A	A	H	H	A	H	A	H	A	H	H	A	H	A	A	H	A	H	A	A	H
Result	W	D	L	L	L	D	L	W	L	D	W	L	L	D	L	W	W	L	D	D	L	L	W	D	L	W	L	W	W	W	W	W	L	D	W	D
Position	1	2	5	6	7	9	9	7	7	7	7	7	7	7	8	7	7	7	7	7	7	8	7	7	8	7	7	7	7	7	6	5	6	5	5	6

A = Away; H = Home; W = Win; D = Draw; L = Loss

==== Matches ====
Win Draw Loss

The fixtures for the 2018 season were announced on 19 December 2017.

16 February 2018 1	Bohemians	3–1	Shamrock Rovers	Phibsborough, Dublin
19:30	Dan Casey 72', 84'; Paddy Kavanagh 81'; Paddy Kavanagh (yellow card) 90'	Report	Ronan Finn 23'; Ethan Boyle (yellow card) 57'	Stadium: Dalymount Park; Attendance: 3,640; Referee: Paul McLaughlin

24 February 2018 2	Limerick	1–1	Bohemians	Limerick
18:30	Cian Coleman 55'	Report	Philip Gannon (yellow card) 76'; Eoghan Stokes 90'	Stadium: Markets Field; Attendance: 2,225; Referee: Raymond Matthews

27 February 2018 3	Bohemians	0–1	Derry City	Phibsborough, Dublin
19:45		Report	Darren Cole (yellow card) 19'; Ronan Curtis 61' (yellow card) 71'; Rory Patterson (yellow card) 85'; Conor McDermott (yellow card) 85'; Nicky Low (yellow card) 87'; Rory Hale (yellow card) 90'	Stadium: Dalymount Park; Attendance: 1,183; Referee: Robert Harvey

9 March 2018 4	Bohemians	0–1	Saint Patrick's Athletic	Phibsborough, Dublin
19:45	Kevin Devaney (yellow card) 42'; Robert Cornwall (yellow card) 72'	Report	Dean Clarke 15'; Kevin Toner (yellow card) 37'	Stadium: Dalymount Park; Attendance: 2,814; Referee: Robert Hennessy

12 March 2018 5	Waterford	1–0	Bohemians	Waterford
19:45	Sander Puri 51'; Courtney Duffus (yellow card) 81'	Report	Karl Moore (yellow card) 65'	Stadium: Regional Sports Centre; Attendance: 2,284; Referee: Graham Kelly

16 March 2018 6	Bohemians	2–2	Sligo Rovers	Phibsborough, Dublin
19:45	Eoghan Stokes 28'; Ian Morris 60'	Report	David Cawley 35'; Adam Morgan 62' (yellow card) 70'; Seamus Sharkey (yellow card) 66'	Stadium: Dalymount Park; Attendance: 1,623; Referee: Raymond Matthews

19 March 2018 7	Cork City	3–0	Bohemians	Cork
15:00	Graham Cummins 18'; Kieran Sadlier 21' (pen.); Karl Sheppard 87'	Report	Robert Cornwall (yellow card) 21'	Stadium: Turners Cross (stadium); Attendance: 4,265; Referee: Raymond Matthews

23 March 2018 8	Bohemians	2-1	Bray Wanderers	Phibsborough, Dublin
19:45	Robert Cornwall 4'; Dinny Corcoran 90'	Report	Daniel Kelly 3'; Kevin Lynch (yellow card) 23'; John Sullivan (yellow card) 41'; Hugh Douglas (yellow card) 73'; Jake Kelly (yellow card) 85'	Stadium: Dalymount Park; Attendance: 1,853; Referee: Robert Rogers

30 March 2018 9	Dundalk	3-0	Bohemians	Dundalk
19:45	Patrick Hoban 21' (pen.); Sean Gannon 31'; Patrick Hoban (yellow card) 60'; Robert Benson (yellow card) 64'; Michael Duffy 90'	Report	Paddy Kavanagh (yellow card) 52'	Stadium: Oriel Park; Attendance: 3,263; Referee: Graham Kelly

6 April 2018 10	Bohemians	0-0	Limerick	Phibsborough, Dublin
19:45		Report	Darren Dennehy (yellow card) 90'	Stadium: Dalymount Park; Attendance: 1,674; Referee: John McLoughlin

13 April 2018 11	Shamrock Rovers	1-2	Bohemians	Tallaght, Dublin
20:00	Daniel Carr 28'; Greg Bolger (yellow card) 88'	Report	Keith Buckley (yellow card) 29'; Daniel Byrne 70' (yellow card) 70'; Philip Gannon (yellow card) 86'; Darragh Leahy 90' (yellow card) 90'	Stadium: Tallaght Stadium; Attendance: 4,512; Referee: Robert Harvey

16 April 2018 12	Derry City	3-1	Bohemians	Derry
19:45	Aaron McEneff 20'; Rory Patterson 58'; Ronan Curtis (yellow card) 65'; Nicky Low 90'	Report	Dylan Watts 20'; Daniel Byrne (yellow card) 45'; Dan Casey (yellow card) 50'; Paddy Kavanagh (red card) 56'	Stadium: Brandywell Stadium; Attendance: 2,650; Referee: Robert Rogers

20 April 2018 13	Bohemians	0-2	Cork City	Phibsborough, Dublin
20:00		Report	Colm Horgan 10'; Gearoid Morrissey (yellow card) 63'; Graham Cummins 65'; Aaron Barry (yellow card) 87'	Stadium: Dalymount Park; Attendance: 2,281; Referee: Paul McLaughlin

27 April 2018 14	St Patrick's Athletic	2-2	Bohemians	Inchicore, Dublin
19:45	Jake Keegan 3', 48'; Ryan Brennan (yellow card) 50' (yellow card) 52' (red card); Thomas Byrne (yellow card) 83'	Report	Keith Buckley (yellow card) 35'; Daniel Byrne (yellow card) 39'; Eoghan Stokes (yellow card) 60'; Dinny Corcoran 72'; Oscar Brennan (yellow card) 85'; Kevin Devaney 90'	Stadium: Richmond Park; Attendance: 2,429; Referee: Tomas Connolly

30 April 2018 15	Bohemians	0-1	Waterford	Phibsborough, Dublin
19:45	Oscar Brennan (yellow card) 35'	Report	Courtney Duffus 16'; Dylan Barnett (yellow card) 39'	Stadium: Dalymount Park; Attendance: 1,540; Referee: Raymond Matthews

5 May 2018 16	Sligo Rovers	0-2	Bohemians	Sligo
19:45	Jack Keaney (yellow card) 29'; Raffaele Cretaro (yellow card) 36'; Gary Boylan (yellow card) 87'	Report	Keith Ward (yellow card) 55'; Daniel Grant 68'; Oscar Brennan (yellow card) 77'; Daniel Grant 85'	Stadium: The Showgrounds (Sligo); Attendance: 2,033; Referee: Ben Connolly

11 May 2018 17	Bray Wanderers	1-3	Bohemians	Bray
19:45	Cory Galvin (yellow card) 22'; Daniel Kelly (yellow card) 40'; Gary McCabe 45' (pen.), (yellow card) 55'; Sean Heaney (yellow card) 77'	Report	Daniel Corcoran 6'; Keith Ward 32'; Eoghan Stokes 77'	Stadium: Carlisle Grounds; Attendance: 911; Referee: Sean Grant

18 May 2018 18	Bohemians	0-2	Dundalk	Phibsborough, Dublin
19:45	Oscar Brennan (yellow card) 66'; Robert Cornwall (yellow card) 86'	Report	Patrick Hoban 4'; Sean Hoare 83'	Stadium: Dalymount Park; Attendance: 2,421; Referee: Paul McLaughlin

25 May 2018 19	Bohemians	1-1	Shamrock Rovers	Phibsborough, Dublin
19:45	Keith Buckley (yellow card) 42'; Daniel Byrne (yellow card) 49'; Rob Cornwall 87'	Report	Roberto Lopes (yellow card) 42'; Ronan Finn 83', (yellow card) 85'	Stadium: Dalymount Park; Attendance: 3,466; Referee: Robert Hennessy

1 June 2018 20	Limerick	1-1	Bohemians	Limerick
19:45	Barry Maguire 34'; Eoin Wearen (yellow card) 83'; Karl O'Sullivan (yellow card) 89'	Report	Dan Casey (yellow card) 50', (goal) 85'; Ian Morris (yellow card) 51'	Stadium: Markets Field; Attendance: 1,100; Referee: Tomas Connolly

8 June 2018 21	Bohemians	1-2	Derry City	Phibsborough, Dublin
19:45	Eoghan Stokes (yellow card) 37'; Derek Pender (yellow card) 85'; Jonathan Lunney 86'	Report	Rory Hale 22'; Rory Patterson 25'; Jack Doyle (yellow card) 58'; Ronan Hale (yellow card) 63'; Ronan Curtis (yellow card) 90'	Stadium: Dalymount Park; Attendance: 1,722; Referee: Graham Kelly

15 June 2018 22	Cork City	1-0	Bohemians	Cork
19:45	Gearoid Morrissey 89'	Report	Keith Buckley (yellow card) 36'	Stadium: Turners Cross (stadium); Attendance: 3,604; Referee: Neil Doyle

29 June 2018 23	Bohemians	1-0	St Patrick's Athletic	Phibsborough, Dublin
19:45	Kevin Devaney 39'; Dan Casey (yellow card) 60'; Paddy Kavanagh (yellow card) 67'; Oscar Brennan (yellow card) 78'	Report	Thomas Byrne (yellow card) 15'; Kevin Toner (yellow card) 60'; Ian Birmingham (yellow card) 71'; Killian Brennan (yellow card) 72'	Stadium: Dalymount Park; Attendance: 2,255; Referee: Robert Hennessy

6 July 2018 24	Waterford	1-1	Bohemians	Waterford
19:45	Bastien Hery 64'	Report	Dinny Corcoran 31'	Stadium: Regional Sports Centre; Attendance: 1,831; Referee: Anthony Buttimer

13 July 2018 25	Bohemians	0-3	Sligo Rovers	Phibsborough, Dublin
19:45	Derek Pender (red card) 51'; Kevin Devaney (yellow card) 77'	Report	Jack Keaney 13'; Dinny Corcoran 40' (o.g.); Kris Twardek (yellow card) 45'; David Cawley 57'	Stadium: Dalymount Park; Attendance: 1,750; Referee: Paul McLaughlin

20 July 2018 26	Bohemians	6-0	Bray Wanderers	Phibsborough, Dublin
19:45	Daniel Kelly 5', 22'; Dinny Corcoran 26' (pen.); Kevin Devaney 42'; Rob Cornwall 50'; Cristian Magerusan 80'	Report	Sean Harding (yellow card) 90'	Stadium: Dalymount Park; Attendance: 1,631; Referee: Neil Doyle

29 July 2018 27	Dundalk	2-0	Bohemians	Dundalk
19:00	Sean Hoare 31'; Patrick Hoban 51' (pen.)	Report	Darragh Leahy (yellow card) 23'; Ian Morris (yellow card) 44'	Stadium: Oriel Park; Attendance: 3,139; Referee: Robert Hennessy

3 August 2018 28	Bohemians	5-0	Limerick	Phibsborough, Dublin
19:45	Ian Morris (yellow card) 23'; Kevin Devaney 28'; JJ Lunney 41'; Keith Buckley 67'; Daniel Grant 73'; Eoghan Stokes 86' (pen.)	Report	Shane Duggan (yellow card) 77'; Colman Kennedy (red card) 86'	Stadium: Dalymount Park; Attendance: 2000(estimate); Referee: Derek Tomney

17 August 2018 29	Shamrock Rovers	0-1	Bohemians	Tallaght, Dublin
20:00	Ethan Boyle (yellow card) 35'; Joseph O'Brien (yellow card) 84'	Report	Eoghan Stokes 68'; Daniel Grant (yellow card) 84'	Stadium: Tallaght Stadium; Attendance: 4,150; Referee: Neil Doyle

31 August 2018 30	Derry City	0-2	Bohemians	Derry
19:45	Daniel Seaborne (yellow card) 61'	Report	Dinny Corcorcan 1'; Daniel Kelly 54'	Stadium: Brandywell Stadium; Attendance: 1,500 (estimate); Referee: Damien MacGraith

14 September 2018 31	Bohemians	4-2	Cork City	Phibsborough, Dublin
19:35	Damien Delaney 10' (o.g.); Daniel Kelly 22', 30'; Derek Pender 45', (yellow card) 56'; Shane Supple (yellow card) 66'	Report	Aaron Barry (yellow card) 13'; Graham Cummins 37'; Jimmy Keohane 58'; Karl Sheppard (yellow card) 83'; Steven Beattie (yellow card) 90'	Stadium: Dalymount Park; Attendance: 2,279; Referee: Paul McLaughlin

22 September 2018 32	St Patrick's Athletic	1-3	Bohemians	Inchicore, Dublin
17:30	Achille Campion 4', (yellow card) 63'; Lee Desmond (yellow card) 81'; Michael Barker (yellow card) 90'	Report	Ali Reghba 27', 83', (yellow card) 49'; Robbie McCourt 56'	Stadium: Richmond Park; Attendance: 1,900 (estimate); Referee: Robert Hennessy

5 October 2018 33	Bohemians	1-3	Waterford	Phibsborough, Dublin
19:45	Cristian Magerusan 15'; Patrick Kirk (yellow card) 23'; Eoghan Stokes (yellow card) 26'; Jamie Hamilton (yellow card) 87'	Report	Sander Puri 20'; Stanley Aborah 24' (pen.), (yellow card) 90'; Noel Hunt 56'	Stadium: Dalymount Park; Attendance: 1,959; Referee: Sean Grant

13 October 2018 34	Sligo Rovers	P-P	Bohemians	Sligo
19:45				Stadium: The Showgrounds (Sligo)
Note: Postponed until 22 October due to both teams being involved in the Irn Bru Cup round 2.

19 October 2018 35	Bray Wanderers	0-5	Bohemians	Bray
19:45		Report	Daniel Corcoran 8', 11', 39', 68'; Kevin Devaney 25'; Keith Buckley (yellow card) 79'	Stadium: Carlisle Grounds; Attendance: 852; Referee: Graham Kelly

22 October 2018 34	Sligo Rovers	1-1	Bohemians	Sligo
19:45	Michael Drennan 3'	Report	Keith Ward 33' (pen.)	Stadium: The Showgrounds (Sligo); Attendance: 879; Referee: Paul McLaughlin

26 October 2018 36	Bohemians	1-1	Dundalk	Phibsborough, Dublin
19:45	Daniel Corcoran 22'	Report	Brian Gartland (yellow card) 63'; George Poynton (yellow card) 63'; Daniel Cleary 78'	Stadium: Dalymount Park; Attendance: 2,634; Referee: Robert Hennessy

Last updated: 2 November 2018.
Source: SSE Airtricity League

=== FAI Cup ===
Win Draw Loss

10 August 2018 First Round	Wexford FC	0–7	Bohemian FC	Wexford
20:00		Report	JJ Lunney 4'; Dinny Corcoran 9', 58'; Daniel Kelly 15'; Keith Ward 29'; Eoghan Stokes 70'; Cristian Magerusan 79'	Stadium: Ferrycarrig Park; Referee: Graham Kelly

24 August 2018 Second Round	Galway United	0–2	Bohemian FC	Galway
19:45		Report	Darragh Leahy 6'; Eoghan Stokes 79'	Stadium: Eamonn Deacy Park; Attendance: 733; Referee: Robert Hennessy

19 September 2018 Quarter Final	Derry City	1-3	Bohemian FC	Derry
19:45	Kevin McHattie (yellow card) 36'; Ronan Hale (yellow card) 42'; Dean Shiels (yellow card) 61'; Alistair Roy 62'; Rory Hale (yellow card) 79'; Nicky Low (yellow card) 90'	Report	Dan Casey 42'; Daniel Corcoran 59', 90'; Derek Pender (yellow card) 66'; Kevin Devaney (yellow card) 90'	Stadium: Brandywell Stadium; Referee: Robert Harvey

30 September 2018 Semi Final	Bohemian FC	1-1	Cork City	Phibsborough, Dublin
17:45	Daniel Kelly (yellow card) 55'; Daniel Corcoran 68'; Dan Casey (yellow card) 85'	Report	Shane Griffin (yellow card) 30'; Kieran Sadlier 85' (pen.)	Stadium: Dalymount Park; Attendance: 3,207; Referee: Robert Rogers

8 October 2018 Semi Final Replay	Cork City	2-1	Bohemian FC	Cork
19:30	Graham Cummins 30'; Karl Sheppard 37'	Report	Robert Cornwall (yellow card) 35'; Ian Morris 59', (yellow card) 80'	Stadium: Turner's Cross; Referee: Neil Doyle

Last updated: 2 November 2018.
Source: SSE Airtricity League

=== EA Sports Cup ===
Win Draw Loss

26 March 2018 First Round	Bohemians	5-1	Cabinteely	Phibsborough, Dublin
19:45	Daniel Grant 36', 65'; Dylan Watts 37', 76'; Rob Manley 42'	Report	Sean Fitzpatrick 8'	Stadium: Dalymount Park; Attendance: 410; Referee: Derek Tomney

2 April 2018 Second Round	Bohemians	2-2 (a.e.t.) (5–3 p)	U.C.D.	Phibsborough, Dublin
15:00	Dylan Thornton (yellow card) 51'; Eoghan Stokes 54'; Patrick Kirk (yellow card) 75'; Jonathan Lunney 85' (pen.)	Report	Yousef Mahdy 21'; Gary O’Neill 35' (yellow card) 115'; Joshua Collins (yellow card) 115'	Stadium: Dalymount Park; Attendance: 314; Referee: Derek Tomney
	Penalties
	Dan Casey (penalty scored); Jamie Hamilton (penalty scored); Ryan Graydon (penalty scored); Jonathan Lunney (penalty scored); Eoghan Stokes (penalty scored)		(penalty scored) Gary O’Neill; (penalty scored) Timmy Molloy; (penalty scored) Ben Hanrahan; (penalty missed) Paul Doyle

8 May 2018 Quarter Final	Dundalk	3-0	Bohemians	Dundalk
19:45	Dylan Connolly 8', 21'; Jamie McGrath 88'	Report	Oscar Brennan (yellow card) 52'; Philip Gannon (yellow card) 81'	Stadium: Oriel Park; Attendance: 1,000 (estimate); Referee: Robert Rogers

Last updated: 2 November 2018.
Source: SSE Airtricity League

=== Leinster Senior Cup ===
Win Draw Loss

11 March 2019 Fourth Round	Dundalk	3-1	Bohemians	Dundalk
19:45 GMT	Ronan Murray 69'; Sam Byrne 81'; Krisztián Adorján 84'	Report	Jonathan Lunney 8' (pen.)	Stadium: Oriel Park; Attendance: 500 (est.); Referee: Tom Dempsey

=== Scottish Challenge Cup ===
Win Draw Loss

8 September 2018 Second Round	Peterhead	0-1	Bohemian FC	Peterhead, Scotland
15:00		Report	Kevin Devaney 63'	Stadium: Balmoor Stadium; Attendance: 716

13 October 2018 Third Round	Bohemian FC	0-0 (4–3 p)	Sutton United	Phibsborough, Dublin
15:00		Report		Stadium: Dalymount Park; Attendance: 1,130; Referee: Mike Roncone
	Penalties
	Jonathan Lunney (penalty scored); Derek Pender (penalty scored); Oscar Brennan (penalty missed); Eoghan Stokes (penalty missed); Shane Supple (penalty scored); Robert Cornwall (penalty scored)		(penalty scored) Ross Lafayette; (penalty scored) Kenny Davis; (penalty missed) Kieron Cadogan; (penalty missed) Craig Eastmond; (penalty missed) Aswad Thomas

2 February 2019 Quarter Final	Bohemians	w/o	East Fife	Phibsborough, Dublin
15:00				Stadium: Dalymount Park
Note: Originally postponed until further notice due to unplayable/frozen pitch. Bohemians later withdrew from the competition.

Notes

1. B-The Bohemians-East Fife match was originally due to take place on 17 November 2018 but was rearranged as the Irish football season had finished. It was rearranged to be played on 2 February 2019 but was called off due to a frozen pitch before kick-off. Following discussions with the SPFL in an attempt to rearrange the fixture again, Bohemians withdrew from the competition and East Fife advanced to the semi-finals.

Last updated: 22 July 2019.
Source: SPFL
