= Dan Casey (footballer) =

Irish footballer (born 1997)

Personal information
- Full name: Dan Patrick Casey
- Date of birth: 29 October 1997 (age 29)
- Place of birth: Dublin, Ireland
- Height: 1.86 m (6 ft 1 in)
- Position: Defender

Team information
- Current team: Wycombe Wanderers
- Number: 17

Youth career
- −2013: St Joseph's Boys
- 2013−2017: Sunderland

Senior career*
Years	Team	Apps	(Gls)
2017−2018	Bohemians	40	(3)
2019	Cork City	29	(3)
2020	Bohemians	15	(0)
2021–2022	Sacramento Republic	56	(3)
2023–2025	Motherwell	73	(6)
2025–	Wycombe Wanderers	29	(5)

International career
2013	Republic of Ireland U17	4	(0)
2015	Republic of Ireland U19	4	(1)
- * Club domestic league appearances and goals as of 9 June 2025

Dan Partrick Casey (born 29 October 1997) is an Irish professional footballer who plays as a defender for EFL League One club Wycombe Wanderers.

== Early life ==
Casey was born in County Dublin and played his underage football with local club St Joseph's Boys.

Before committing to football, he played Gaelic for Cuala CLG. He also played Rugby for his school C.B.C. Monkstown, where his grandfather and Ireland national rugby union team international Patrick Casey attended.

== Career ==
=== Youth ===
Casey spent four years with the academy team at Sunderland, after joining in 2013.

=== Bohemians ===
On 11 July 2017, Casey returned to Ireland, joining League of Ireland Premier Division side Bohemians.

=== Cork City ===
For the 2019 season, Casey moved to Cork City.

=== Return to Bohemians ===
After a single season with Cork City, Casey returned to Bohemians on 14 December 2019 ahead of their 2020 season.

=== Sacramento Republic ===
On 13 January 2021, Casey signed with second-tier side Sacramento Republic FC who play in the USL Championship. He made his debut on 30 April 2021, starting in a 1–0 win over LA Galaxy II. On 7 September 2022, Casey played alongside fellow Irishman Lee Desmond in defence in the 2022 U.S. Open Cup Final as his side were defeated 3–0 by Orlando City in front of a sold-out crowd of over 25,000 at the Exploria Stadium in Florida.

=== Motherwell ===
On 3 February 2023, Casey signed with Scottish Premiership club Motherwell. On 9 June 2025, Motherwell announced that Casey had rejected a new contract offer with the club as he was exploring options from clubs in England.

=== Wycombe Wanderers ===
On 14 June 2025, Casey signed a pre-contract with Wycombe Wanderers to join on 1 July 2025.

== Career statistics ==
As of match played on 18 May 2025

Appearances and goals by club, season and competition
Club	Season	Sunday league			National Cup (Note: Includes FAI Cup, U.S. Open Cup & Scottish Cup)		League Cup (Note: Includes League of Ireland Cup & Scottish League Cup)		Continental		Other		Total	
Club	Season	Division	Apps	Goals	Apps	Goals	Apps	Goals	Apps	Goals	Apps	Goals	Apps	Goals
Bohemians	2017	LOI Premier Division	9	0	0	0	—		—		—		9	0
Bohemians	2018	LOI Premier Division	31	3	4	1	1	0	—		0 (Note: Appearances in the Leinster Senior Cup)	0	36	4
Bohemians	Total		40	3	4	1	1	0	—		0	0	45	4
Cork City	2019	LOI Premier Division	29	3	2	0	1	0	2 (Note: Appearances in the UEFA Europa League)	0	1 (Note: Appearance in the President of Ireland's Cup)	0	35	3
Bohemians	2020	LOI Premier Division	15	0	1	0	—		1	0	—		17	0
Sacramento Republic	2021	USL Championship	29	1	0	0	—		—		—		29	1
Sacramento Republic	2022	USL Championship	27	2	7	1	—		—		2 (Note: Appearances in the 2022 USL Championship Playoffs)	0	36	3
Sacramento Republic	Total		56	3	7	1	—		—		2	0	65	4
Motherwell	2022–23	Scottish Premiership	12	0	1	0	—		—		—		13	0
Motherwell	2023–24	Scottish Premiership	28	3	0	0	3	0	—		—		31	3
Motherwell	2024–25	Scottish Premiership	33	3	1	0	7	1	—		—		41	4
Motherwell	Total		73	6	2	0	10	1	—		—		85	7
Wycombe Wanderers	2025–26	EFL League One	0	0	0	0	0	0	—		0	0	0	0
Career total			213	15	16	2	12	1	3	0	3	0	247	18
