= Andy Lyons (Irish footballer) =

Irish footballer (born 2000)

Personal information
- Full name: Andrew Patrick Lyons
- Date of birth: 2 August 2000 (age 26)
- Place of birth: Naas, County Kildare, Ireland
- Height: 1.78 m (5 ft 10 in)
- Position: Defender

Team information
- Current team: Blackpool
- Number: 2

Youth career
- –2016: St Joseph's Boys
- 2016: Bray Wanderers
- 2016–2017: Bohemians

Senior career*
Years	Team	Apps	(Gls)
2018–2021	Bohemians	58	(1)
2022	Shamrock Rovers	31	(7)
2023–	Blackpool	56	(5)

International career^{‡}
- Republic of Ireland U15
- Republic of Ireland U17
- Republic of Ireland U19
2021–2022	Republic of Ireland U21	6	(0)
- * Club domestic league appearances and goals as of 15:13, 8 November 2026 (UTC) ‡ National team caps and goals as of 23:51, 27 September 2022 (UTC)

Andrew Patrick Lyons (born 2 August 2000) is an Irish professional footballer who plays as a defender for EFL League One club Blackpool.

== Club career ==
=== Youth career ===
A native of Naas, County Kildare, Lyons originally played with Dublin club St Joseph's Boys until July 2016, when he signed for League of Ireland club Bray Wanderers under-17 side, although a month later he signed for the under-17 side of Bohemians. In 2017 and 2018, Lyons helped his club to back-to-back League of Ireland U19 Division wins, an Enda McGuill Cup win in 2018, while he also featured in the UEFA Youth League against Midtjylland in 2018 and PAOK in 2019. He was named League of Ireland U19 Division Player of the Year during his time with the club's under-19 team.

=== Bohemians ===
Lyons was an unused substitute in three league fixtures during the 2017 season. He made his debut in senior football on 5 June 2018 in a 3–1 defeat away to Dundalk in the Leinster Senior Cup. Lyons scored the first goal of his senior career on 16 September 2019 in a 2–0 win over Crumlin United in the quarter-final of the FAI Cup at Richmond Park. At the end of the 2020 season, he was named in the PFAI Team of the Year by his fellow professionals. He signed a new one-year contract with the club on 25 January 2021.

=== Shamrock Rovers ===
Lyons signed a multi-year contract with rivals Shamrock Rovers on 24 January 2022. In doing so, he moved from a part-time contract with Bohemians to a full-time contract with Rovers. Lyons scored the first European goal of his career on 25 August 2022 in a 1–0 win over Hungarian side Ferencváros in a UEFA Europa League playoff round tie at Tallaght Stadium. On 6 September 2022, he was named League of Ireland Player of the Month for the previous month. Lyons was named the PFAI Players' Young Player of the Year for the 2022 season.

=== Blackpool ===
On 29 August 2022, it was announced that Lyons would join EFL Championship club Blackpool in January 2023 on a three-and-a-half-year deal, for a fee believed to be in the region of £300,000 plus add-ons. He made his debut for the club on 7 January 2023, playing the full 90 minutes in a 4–1 win over Premier League side Nottingham Forest in the FA Cup. He scored his first goal for the club on 7 February 2023 in a 2–2 draw with Huddersfield Town at Bloomfield Road. In February 2024, Lyons suffered a serious knee injury, ruling him out for an extended period.

At the end of the 2025–26 season, the club extended his contract.

== International career ==
Lyons has represented the Republic of Ireland at every level from under-15 up to under-21 level, including representing the under-19 side in the 2019 UEFA European Under-19 Championship in Armenia. He made his debut for the under-21 team in a friendly against Australia U23 on 2 June 2021.

== Career statistics ==
As of match played 7 November 2026

Appearances and goals by club, season and competition
Club	Season	League			National Cup (Note: Includes FAI Cup, FA Cup)		League Cup (Note: Includes League of Ireland Cup, EFL Cup)		Europe		Other		Total	
Club	Season	Division	Apps	Goals	Apps	Goals	Apps	Goals	Apps	Goals	Apps	Goals	Apps	Goals
Bohemians	2018	LOI Premier Division	5	0	0	0	1	0	—		2 (Note: One appearance in Scottish Challenge Cup, one appearance in Leinster Senior Cup)	0	8	0
Bohemians	2019	LOI Premier Division	14	0	3	1	2	0	—		2	0	21	1
Bohemians	2020	LOI Premier Division	14	0	0	0	—		1 (Note: Appearance in UEFA Europa League)	0	—		15	0
Bohemians	2021	LOI Premier Division	25	1	4	1	—		6 (Note: Appearances in UEFA Europa Conference League)	0	—		35	2
Bohemians	Total		58	1	7	2	3	0	7	0	4	0	79	3
Shamrock Rovers	2022	LOI Premier Division	31	7	1	1	—		13 (Note: Four appearances in UEFA Champions League, four appearances and one goal in UEFA Europa League, five appearances in UEFA Europa Conference League)	1	0	0	51	9
Blackpool	2022–23	EFL Championship	17	4	2	0	—		—		—		19	4
Blackpool	2023–24	EFL League One	15	1	3	0	2	0	—		5 (Note: Appearance(s) in the EFL Trophy)	1	25	2
Blackpool	2024–25	EFL League One	1	0	0	0	0	0	—		0	0	1	0
Blackpool	2025–26	EFL League One	22	0	2	0	1	0	—		3	1	27	1
Blackpool	2026–27	EFL League One	2	0	1	0	2	0	—		3	0	8	0
Blackpool	Total		56	5	8	0	5	0	0	0	11	2	80	7
Career total			145	13	16	3	8	0	20	1	15	2	210	19

== Honours ==
Individual

- PFAI Team of the Year: 2020
- League of Ireland Premier Division Player of the Month: August 2022
- PFAI Players' Young Player of the Year: 2022
