= Cristian Măgerușan =

Romanian footballer

Personal information
- Date of birth: 16 September 1999 (age 27)
- Place of birth: Bistrița, Romania
- Height: 1.88 m (6 ft 2 in)
- Position: Forward

Team information
- Current team: Rayong
- Number: 99

Youth career
- Arsenal Bistrița
- CFR Cluj
- Gheorghe Hagi Academy
- –2017: Lucan United
- 2017–2018: Bohemians

Senior career*
Years	Team	Apps	(Gls)
2018–2020	Bohemians	4	(2)
2022–2023	Longford Town	37	(14)
2024	Bray Wanderers	24	(9)
2025	CSA Steaua București	11	(2)
2025–2026	ASA Târgu Mureș	22	(16)
2026–	Rayong	2	(0)
- * Club domestic league appearances and goals as of 20 September 2026

Cristian Măgerușan (born 16 September 1999) is a Romanian professional footballer who plays as a forward for Thai League 1 club Rayong.

== Career statistics ==
As of match played 20 September 2026

Appearances and goals by club, season and competition
Club	Season	League			National cup (Note: Includes FAI Cup)		Other		Total	
Club	Season	Division	Apps	Goals	Apps	Goals	Apps	Goals	Goals	Apps
Bohemians	2018	LOI Premier Division	4	2	1	1	1 (Note: Appearance in Scottish Challenge Cup)	0	6	3
Bohemians	2019	LOI Premier Division	0	0	0	0	0	0	0	0
Bohemians	2020	LOI Premier Division	0	0	0	0	0	0	0	0
Bohemians	Total		4	2	1	1	1	0	6	3
Longford Town	2022	LOI First Division	18	4	0	0	2 (Note: Appearances in League of Ireland promotion play-offs)	0	20	4
Longford Town	2023	LOI First Division	19	10	0	0	0	0	19	10
Longford Town	Total		37	14	0	0	2	0	39	14
Bray Wanderers	2024	LOI First Division	24	9	0	0	4	1	28	10
CSA Steaua București	2024–25	Liga II	11	2	—		—		11	2
ASA Târgu Mureș	2025–26	Liga II	22	16	—		—		22	16
Rayong	2026–27	Thai League 1	2	0	0	0	—		2	0
Career total			100	43	1	0	7	1	108	44
