= Keith Buckley (disambiguation) =

Keith Buckley (born 1979) is an American singer-songwriter.

Keith Buckley may also refer to:

- Keith Buckley (actor) (1941–2020), English actor
- Keith Buckley (footballer) (born 1992), Irish footballer
