= Walter Figueira =

English footballer (born 1995)

Personal information
- Full name: Walter Capango Figueira
- Date of birth: 17 March 1995 (age 31)
- Place of birth: Battersea, England
- Height: 1.82 m (5 ft 11 1/2 in)
- Position: Forward

Team information
- Current team: Hastings United

Youth career
- –2010: Hampton & Richmond Borough
- 2010–2013: Chelsea
- 2012: → Brentford (loan)

Senior career*
Years	Team	Apps	(Gls)
2013	Hayes & Yeading United	1	(0)
2014–2016	Platanias	8	(0)
2015–2016	→ Acharnaikos (loan)	7	(0)
2016	Bognor Regis Town	4	(0)
2016–2017	Chessington & Hook United		
2017	Wingate & Finchley	6	(1)
2017–2018	Moura	27	(3)
2018	Dulwich Hamlet	5	(0)
2018	→ Merstham (loan)	11	(4)
2018–2019	Merstham	24	(12)
2019	Waterford	11	(2)
2020	Derry City	18	(3)
2021	Sligo Rovers	33	(2)
2022	Kingstonian	16	(3)
2022–2023	Carshalton Athletic	18	(2)
2023	Bognor Regis Town	19	(0)
2023–2024	Haringey Borough	25	(2)
2024	Lewes	7	(2)
2024	Cray Valley Paper Mills	0	(0)
2024–2025	AFC Croydon Athletic	9	(1)
2025	Raynes Park Vale	12	(2)
2025	Lewes	6	(1)
2025–	Hastings United	5	(1)
- * Club domestic league appearances and goals as of 13:16, 31 October 2025 (UTC)

Walter Capango Figueira (born 17 March 1995) is an English professional footballer who plays as a forward for Isthmian League South East Division club Hastings United.

== Club career ==
After impressing as a junior at Hampton & Richmond Borough, Walter joined Chelsea in 2010. He played 22 games (scoring five goals) for the Under 18s and Under 21s before injury curtailed his stay at Stamford Bridge. He had a work experience loan with the U18 team at League One club Brentford in 2012. Having been released, he played one game at Hayes & Yeading United in the Conference South before moving to Greece. He joined Platanias who play in the top division in Greece, and made eleven appearances for them last season. Figueira made his professional debut as a substitute in the 88th minute in the 1–0 loss to Asteras Tripolis in the Super League Greece. He also played on loan at Acharnaikos who play in the league below the top division.

After spells with Bognor Regis Town and Chessington & Hook United, Figueira joined Wingate & Finchley in February 2017.

Following his spell with Wingate & Finchley, Figueira opted to join Portuguese side Moura.

On 4 August 2018, Figueira signed for National League South side Dulwich Hamlet.

On 19 September 2018, Figueira agreed to join Isthmian League side, Merstham on a three-month loan. The deal was then made permanent on 19 December 2018.

On 29 July 2019, Figueira joined League of Ireland Premier Division side Waterford on a deal until the end of the season.

On 28 January 2021 Figueira signed for Sligo Rovers.

On 2 February 2022, Figueira signed for Isthmian League Premier Division side Kingstonian.

Figueira joined Carshalton Athletic for the 2022–23 season. In January 2023, he returned to Bognor Regis Town having spent time with the club seven years prior.

He joined Lewes in March 2024 following a spell with Haringey Borough.

In September 2024, he joined Cray Valley Paper Mills.

In October 2025, Figueira joined Isthmian League South East Division club Hastings United.

== Career statistics ==
As of end of 2024–25 season

Club	Season	League			National Cup		League Cup		Other		Total	
Club	Season	Division	Apps	Goals	Apps	Goals	Apps	Goals	Apps	Goals	Apps	Goals
Hayes & Yeading United	2013–14	Conference South	1	0	0	0	—		0	0	1	0
Platanias	2014–15	Super League Greece	8	0	3	0	—		—		11	0
Acharnaikos (loan)	2015–16	Football League	7	0	4	0	—		—		11	0
Bognor Regis Town	2016–17	Isthmian League Premier Division	4	0	2	0	—		0	0	6	0
Wingate & Finchley	2016–17	Isthmian League Premier Division	6	1	—		—		1 (Note: Appearance(s) in Isthmian League Premier Division play-offs)	0	7	1
Moura	2017–18	Campeonato de Portugal Serie E	27	3	0	0	—		—		27	3
Dulwich Hamlet	2018–19	National League South	5	0	0	0	—		0	0	5	0
Merstham (loan)	2018–19	Isthmian League Premier Division	11	4	0	0	—		4 (Note: Three appearances and two goals in Alan Turvey Trophy, one appearance in FA Trophy)	2	15	6
Merstham	2018–19	Isthmian League Premier Division	24	12	0	0	—		3 (Note: Two appearances and one goal in Isthmian League Premier Division play-offs, one appearance in Alan Turvey Trophy)	1	27	13
Waterford	2019	League of Ireland Premier Division	11	2	1	0	1	2	1 (Note: One appearance in Scottish Challenge Cup)	0	14	3
Derry City	2020	League of Ireland Premier Division	18	3	1	0	—		0	0	19	3
Sligo Rovers	2021	League of Ireland Premier Division	33	2	1	0	—		2 (Note: Two appearances in UEFA Europa Conference League)	0	36	2
Kingstonian	2021–22	Isthmian League Premier Division	16	3	0	0	—		3 (Note: Two appearances in Surrey Senior Cup, one appearance in Alan Turvey Trophy)	0	19	3
Carshalton Athletic	2022–23	Isthmian League Premier Division	17	2	3	0	—		2 (Note: Appearance(s) in FA Trophy)	0	22	2
Bognor Regis Town	2022–23	Isthmian League Premier Division	19	0	0	0	—		2 (Note: Appearance(s) in Sussex Senior Cup)	0	21	0
Haringey Borough	2023–24	Isthmian League Premier Division	24	2	4	1	—		6 (Note: Two appearances in London Senior Cup, two appearances in FA Trophy, two appearances in Alan Turvey Trophy)	0	34	3
Lewes	2023–24	Isthmian League Premier Division	7	2	0	0	—		0	0	7	2
Cray Valley Paper Mills	2024–25	Isthmian League Premier Division	0	0	0	0	—		1 (Note: Appearance(s) in Kent Senior Cup)	0	1	0
AFC Croydon Athletic	2024–25	Isthmian League South East Division	9	1	0	0	—		2 (Note: One appearance in Alan Turvey Trophy, one appearance in London Senior Cup)	0	11	1
Raynes Park Vale	2024–25	Isthmian League South Central Division	12	2	0	0	—		0	0	12	2
Career total			259	39	19	1	1	2	28	4	307	46
