= Eoin Wearen =

Irish footballer

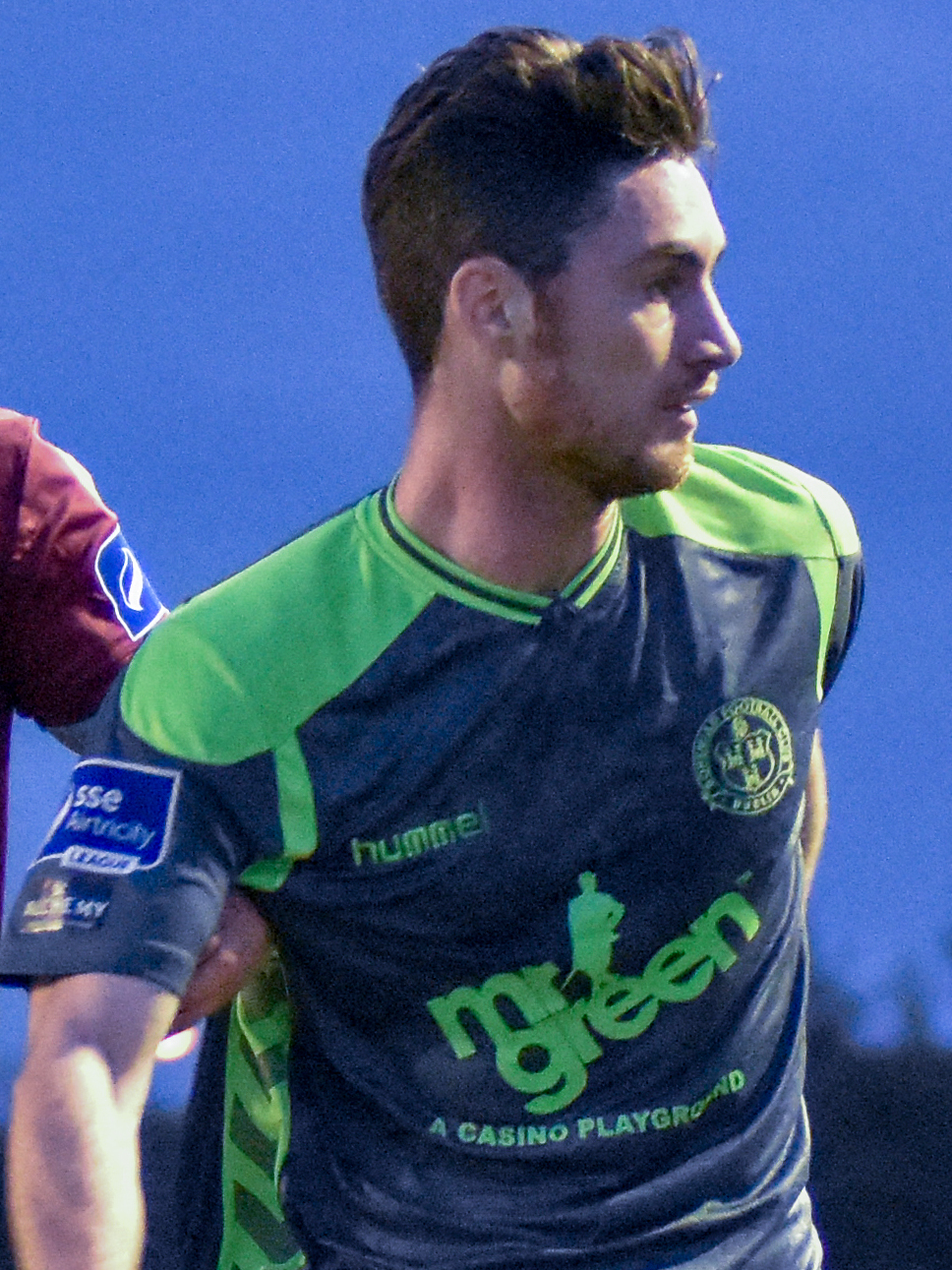
- Wearen playing for Bohemians in 2016

Personal information
- Full name: Eoin Patrick Wearen
- Date of birth: 2 October 1992 (age 34)
- Place of birth: Dublin, Ireland
- Positions: Centre midfielder; centre back

Youth career
- St Kevin's Boys
- 2008–2011: West Ham United

Senior career*
Years	Team	Apps	(Gls)
2011–2013	West Ham United	0	(0)
2012	→ Dagenham & Redbridge (loan)	2	(0)
2014	Bohemians	15	(3)
2015	Sligo Rovers	11	(1)
2015–2018	Bohemians	40	(0)
2018	Limerick	21	(0)
2019	Glenavon	20	(2)
2021	Denton Diablos (Amateur)	13	(3)

International career
2008–2009	Republic of Ireland U17		
2011–2012	Republic of Ireland U19	7	(0)
- * Club domestic league appearances and goals

Eoin Patrick Wearen (born 2 October 1992) is an Irish retired footballer who played as a midfielder/defender for various clubs in both the UK and Ireland.

== Club career ==
Growing-up in Dublin, Wearen played Gaelic football for Scoil Uí Chonaill and football for St. Kevin's Boys, the boys' club in Dublin which gave starts to Liam Brady, Damien Duff and Stephen Carr amongst others. Given the opportunity to join Dublin's Gaelic Football team in 2008 he instead chose to join the youth team of West Ham United.

Having played youth and reserve team football, in January 2012 he moved on loan to League Two side, Dagenham & Redbridge until 31 January 2012. Wearen made his debut for Dagenham on 7 January in the FA Cup third-round game against Millwall which finished 0–0. At the end of January 2012 Wearen returned to West Ham having played four games, in all competitions, for Dagenham. Wearen signed for League of Ireland side Bohemians in May 2014, making his debut as a half-time substitute against Derry City on 2 May at Dalymount Park. In November 2014, Wearan signed for Sligo Rovers. Following on from Owen Heary's departure from Sligo Rovers, Wearen rejoined Bohemians in July 2015.

In January 2018, Wearen joined Limerick.

On 28 January 2019, Wearen signed for NIFL Premiership club Glenavon on a 2 1/2-year contract. Following multiple leg injuries Glenavon and Wearen mutually terminate his contract in December.

Whilein the United States, Wearen began playing for the Denton Diablos of the National Premier Soccer League, a semi-professional summer league. During his first season, Wearen wore the captain's armband and the team won the NPSL National Championship, with him also scoring an early goal in the final against Tulsa Athletic.

== International career ==
Making his debut in the qualifying rounds of the 2008 UEFA European Under-17 Football Championship Wearen has represented the Ireland under-17 team and the Ireland under-19 team.

== Coaching career ==
Following Wearen's first anterior cruciate ligament injury whilst at West Ham, he combined studying at the Open University with gaining his coaching badges, working with Bohemians' youth sides as a coach. After his spell at Glenavon and following competition of his UEFA Licensing, Wearen took up an opportunity to further his coaching career in Dallas, Texas.

In 2022, Wearen went to Chicago to join Liverpool's International Academy America.

== Career statistics ==
As of match played 7 August 2021

Appearances and goals by club, season and competition
Club	Season	League			National Cup		League Cup		Continental		Other		Total	
Club	Season	Division	Apps	Goals	Apps	Goals	Apps	Goals	Apps	Goals	Apps	Goals	Apps	Goals
West Ham United	2009–10	Premier League	0	0	0	0	0	0	0	0	0	0	0	0
West Ham United	2010–11	Premier League	0	0	0	0	0	0	0	0	0	0	0	0
West Ham United	2012–13	Premier League	0	0	0	0	0	0	0	0	0	0	0	0
West Ham United	Total		0	0	0	0	0	0	0	0	0	0	0	0
Dagenham & Redbridge (loan)	2011–12	League Two	4	0	2	0	0	0	0	0	0	0	4	0
Dagenham & Redbridge (loan)	Total		2	0	2	0	0	0	0	0	0	0	4	0
Bohemians	2014	Premier Division	15	3	1	0	2	0	0	0	0	0	18	3
Bohemians	Total		15	3	1	0	2	0	0	0	0	0	18	3
Sligo Rovers	2015	Premier Division	11	1	0	0	1	0	0	0	0	0	11	1
Sligo Rovers	Total		11	1	0	0	1	0	0	0	0	0	11	1
Bohemians	2015	Premier Division	11	0	0	0	0	0	0	0	0	0	11	0
Bohemians	2016	Premier Division	28	0	0	0	0	0	0	0	0	0	28	0
Bohemians	2017	Premier Division	1	0	0	0	0	0	0	0	0	0	1	0
Bohemians	Total		40	0	0	0	0	0	0	0	0	0	40	0
Limerick	2018	Premier Division	21	0	0	0	0	0	0	0	0	0	21	0
Limerick	Total		21	0	0	0	0	0	0	0	0	0	21	0
Glenavon	2018–19	Premiership	12	1	0	0	0	0	0	0	0	0	12	1
Glenavon	2019–20	Premiership	8	1	0	0	1	0	0	0	1 (Note: Appearances in Scottish Challenge Cup)	0	10	1
Glenavon	Total		20	2	0	0	1	0	0	0	1	0	22	2
Denton Diablos	2021	NPSL	7	2	0	0	4	1 (Note: Goal in the 8th minute of the 2021 NPSL National Championship is misattributed to James Doyle on match report, but replay and media coverage names Wearen as the goal scorer)	0	0	0	0	11	3
Denton Diablos	Total		7	2	0	0	4	1	0	0	0	0	11	3
Career total			116	8	3	0	8	1	0	0	1	0	128	9

== Honours ==
Bohemians

- Leinster Senior Cup (1): 2015-2016

Glenavon

- Mid-Ulster Cup (1): 2018–19

Denton Diablos

- Lone Star Conference (1): 2021
- NPSL West Region (1): 2021
- NPSL National Championship (1): 2021
