= 2020 Shelbourne F.C. season =

Shelbourne F.C.
2020 season
- Manager: Ian Morris
- Stadium: Tolka Park
- Premier Division: 9th
- FAI Cup: Quarter-final

In 2020, Shelbourne F.C. competed in the League of Ireland Premier Division for the first time since 2013. They were promoted in the 2019 season, having finished top of the first division. For a second season running, Shelbourne were under the management of Ian Morris. In October 2019, shortly after the end of the previous season, Shelbourne released a new jersey ahead of the 2020 season which emulated the style of the 1960s jersey used by the club. This was part of marking the pending 125th anniversary of the founding of the club.

== Overview ==
On 12 March the Football Association of Ireland announced the sudden postponement of football under their rule including the League of Ireland premier division due to the COVID-19 pandemic. This meant the postponement of Shelbourne F.C. fixtures too. This was initially set as a postponement until 29 March but was later extended. Shels finished in 9th position in the league, forcing them into a promotion/relegation play-off with Longford Town. They lost this fixture which condemned them back to the First Division.

Locations of Premier Division teams
Locations of Dublin Premier Division teams

=== League table ===
Pos	Team	Pld	W	D	L	GF	GA	GD	Pts	Qualification or relegation
1	Shamrock Rovers (C)	18	15	3	0	44	7	+37	48	Qualification for Champions League first qualifying round
2	Bohemians	18	12	1	5	23	12	+11	37	Qualification for Europa Conference League first qualifying round (Note: Since the winners of the 2020 FAI Cup (Dundalk) qualified for European competition based on their league position, the final spot awarded to the Cup winner passed to the next best-placed team, i.e. fourth-placed team.)
3	Dundalk	18	7	5	6	25	23	+2	26	Qualification for Europa Conference League first qualifying round
4	Sligo Rovers	18	8	1	9	19	23	−4	25	Qualification for Europa Conference League first qualifying round
5	Waterford	18	7	3	8	17	22	−5	24	
6	St Patrick's Athletic	18	5	6	7	14	17	−3	21	
7	Derry City	18	5	5	8	18	18	0	20	
8	Finn Harps	18	5	5	8	15	24	−9	20	
9	Shelbourne (R)	18	5	4	9	13	22	−9	19	Qualification for relegation play-offs
10	Cork City (R)	18	2	5	11	10	30	−20	11	Relegation to League of Ireland First Division

Source: SSE Airtricity League, Soccerway
Rules for classification: 1) Points; 2) Goal difference; 3) Goals scored.
(C) Champions; (R) Relegated

=== Results summary ===
Overall								Home						Away					
Pld	W	D	L	GF	GA	GD	Pts	W	D	L	GF	GA	GD	W	D	L	GF	GA	GD
18	5	4	9	11	20	−9	19	2	2	4	7	9	−2	3	2	5	4	11	−7

=== FAI Cup ===
Shelbourne received a first round bye. The draw for the second round took place on 12 August 2020 and was broadcast live on the Football Association Ireland Facebook page with Republic of Ireland senior manager Stephen Kenny conducting proceedings.

28 August 2020 Second round	Galway United	2–5	Shelbourne	Galway
19:45 GMT				Stadium: Eamonn Deacy Park
Note: Live coverage on www.watchloi.ie

31 October 2020 Quarter Final	Athlone Town	1-4	Shelbourne	Athlone
19:45 GMT				Stadium: Athlone Town Stadium
Note: Live coverage on www.watchloi.ie
