= Danny Grant (footballer) =

Irish footballer (born 1999)

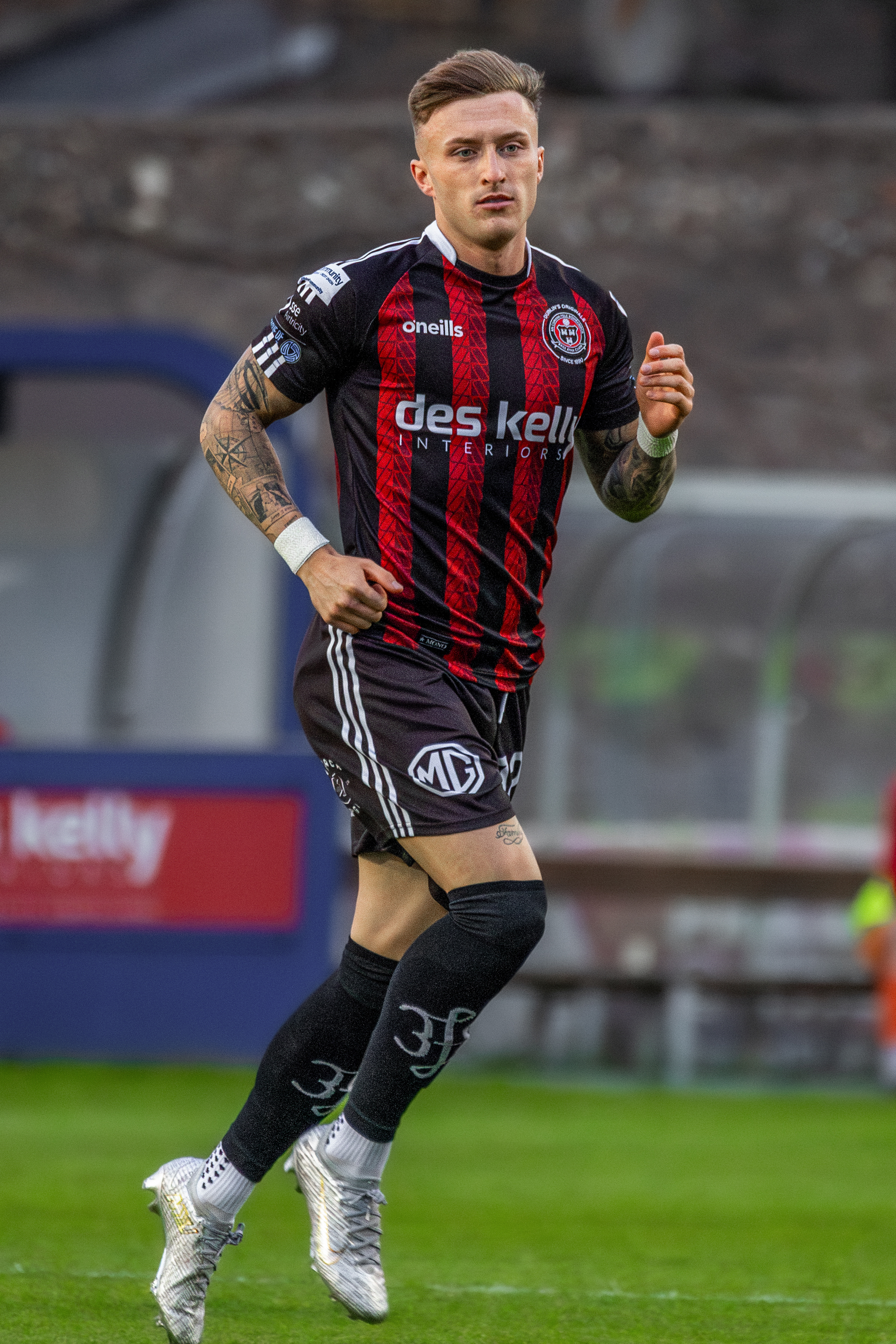

Personal information
- Full name: Daniel Grant
- Date of birth: 23 December 1999 (age 26)
- Place of birth: Lucan, Dublin, Ireland
- Height: 5 ft 10 in (1.78 m)
- Positions: Winger; right midfielder

Team information
- Current team: Shamrock Rovers
- Number: 21

Youth career
- Cherry Orchard
- Crumlin United
- 2017: Bangor Celtic
- 2017–2018: Bohemians

Senior career*
Years	Team	Apps	(Gls)
2018–2020	Bohemians	60	(14)
2021–2023	Huddersfield Town	0	(0)
2022–2023	→ Harrogate Town (loan)	25	(2)
2023–2024	Bohemians	41	(5)
2025–	Shamrock Rovers	41	(4)

International career
2019–2020	Republic of Ireland U21	3	(0)
- * Club domestic league appearances and goals as of 19:14, 21 October 2026 (UTC)

Daniel Grant (born 23 December 1999) is an Irish professional footballer who plays as a winger for League of Ireland Premier Division club Shamrock Rovers.

== Club career ==
=== Bohemians ===
Danny Grant was playing for Bangor Celtic in the Leinster Senior League when he was signed for Bohemian's under-19 team in 2017. Grant was named in the PFAI Team of the Year in 2020 and was also named PFAI Young Player of the Year

=== Huddersfield Town ===
On 19 December 2020, Grant signed a long-term contract with Huddersfield Town in the Championship. The deal ran until the summer of 2023, with the club having the option on a further year's extension. In January 2021, shortly after arriving at the club, Grant tore his right hamstring and having worked his way back to fitness, almost immediately tore the hamstring in his other leg, keeping him out of action for the entirety of 2021.

==== Harrogate Town (loan) ====
On 1 September 2022, Grant joined EFL League Two side Harrogate Town on a season-long loan deal. In May 2023, it was announced that Grant would not be retained by Huddersfield Town upon the expiry of his contract that summer, with Grant failing to make a first team appearance during his time with the club.

=== Shamrock Rovers ===
On 11 December 2024, Grant joined League of Ireland Premier Division side Shamrock Rovers on a multi-year deal. On the 7 March, Grant scored his first goal for Rovers vs St Patrick's Athletic with a solo goal which was deflected in. On 23 August, Grant scored a vital goal away to Portuguese side Santa Clara in the playoff round of the UEFA Conference League, helping to secure a historic qualification to the league stage. Grant also scored a crucial goal away to Cork City in Rovers’ quest for the league title.

== International career ==
Grant has previously represented the Republic of Ireland U21s between 2019 & 2020.

== Career statistics ==
As of match played on 16 October 2026

Appearances and goals by club, season and competition
Club	Division	Season	League		National cup		League cup		Europe		Other		Total	
Club	Division	Season	Apps	Goals	Apps	Goals	Apps	Goals	Apps	Goals	Apps	Goals	Apps	Goals
Bohemians	2018	LOI Premier Division	20	3	3	0	2	2	—		—		25	5
Bohemians	2019	LOI Premier Division	24	4	4	0	0	0	—		1 (Note: Appearance(s) in the Leinster Senior Cup)	1	29	5
Bohemians	2020	LOI Premier Division	16	7	1	0	—		1 (Note: Appearance(s) in the UEFA Europa League)	0	—		18	7
Bohemians	Total		60	14	8	0	3	2	1	0	1	1	73	17
Huddersfield Town	2020–21	Championship	0	0	0	0	—		—		—		0	0
Huddersfield Town	2021–22	Championship	0	0	0	0	0	0	—		0	0	0	0
Huddersfield Town	2022–23	Championship	0	0	—		0	0	—		—		0	0
Huddersfield Town	Total		0	0	0	0	0	0	—		0	0	0	0
Harrogate Town (loan)	2022–23	League Two	25	0	2	0	—		—		1 (Note: Appearance(s) in the EFL Trophy)	1	28	1
Bohemians	2023	LOI Premier Division	12	2	4	0	—		—		0	0	16	2
Bohemians	2024	LOI Premier Division	29	3	4	0	—		—		0	0	33	3
Bohemians	Total		41	5	8	0	—		—		0	0	49	5
Shamrock Rovers	2025	LOI Premier Division	27	2	3	0	—		14 (Note: 2 appearances in the 2024–25 UEFA Conference League campaign; 11 appearances, 2 goals in the 2025–26 UEFA Conference League campaign)	2	0	0	44	4
Shamrock Rovers	2026	LOI Premier Division	14	2	0	0	—		0	0	1 (Note: Appearance in the President of Ireland's Cup)	0	15	2
Shamrock Rovers	Total		41	4	3	0	—		14	2	1	0	59	6
Career total			167	23	21	0	3	2	15	2	3	2	210	29

== Honours ==
Individual

- PFAI Young Player of the Year: 2020
- PFAI Team of the Year: 2020
- League of Ireland Player of the Month: August 2020
