= 2017 Bohemian F.C. season =

Irish football club season

Bohemian F.C.
2017 season
- Manager: Keith Long
- Stadium: Dalymount Park, Phibsborough, Dublin 7
- Premier Division: 5th
- FAI Cup: First round
- League of Ireland Cup: Second round
- Leinster Senior Cup: Quarter final

The 2017 season was Bohemian F.C.'s 127th year in existence as a football club. The club participated in the League of Ireland Premier Division, the FAI Cup, the EA Sports Cup.

== Club ==
=== Kits ===
Tailored by Hummel, the new shirt featured the club's traditional red and black stripes, a new round collar, and the back of the jersey featured the famous club sign from Dalymount Lane.

Supplier: Hummel / Sponsor: Mr Green

=== Management team ===
Position	Name
Head coach	(Republic of Ireland) Keith Long
Assistant head coach	(Republic of Ireland) Trevor Croly
Strength & Conditioning coach	(Republic of Ireland) Graham Norton
Goalkeeper coach	(Scotland) Chris Bennion

== Squad ==
No.	Player	Nat.	Pos.	Date of birth (age)	Since	Ends	Last club
Goalkeepers
1	Shane Supple	(Republic of Ireland)	GK	4 May 1987 (age 38)	2016	2018	(Republic of Ireland) Crumlin United
25	Colin McCabe	(Republic of Ireland)	GK	6 January 1997 (age 29)	2017	2018	(Scotland) Celtic U20
30	Greg Murray	(Republic of Ireland)	GK	30 August 1993 (age 32)	2017	2017	(Republic of Ireland) Shelbourne
Defenders
2	Derek Pender (C)	(Republic of Ireland)	RB	2 October 1984 (age 41)	2012	2019	(Republic of Ireland) St Patrick's Athletic
5	Rob Cornwall	(Republic of Ireland)	CB	16 October 1994 (age 31)	2017	2020	(Republic of Ireland) Shamrock Rovers
6	Dan Byrne	(Republic of Ireland)	CB	7 May 1993 (age 32)	2013	2018	(Republic of Ireland) Kilbarrack United
4	Dominic Peppard	(Republic of Ireland)	CB	17 February 2000 (age 25)	2017	2017	(Republic of Ireland) Bohemians U19
18	Ian Morris	(Republic of Ireland)	CB	27 February 1987 (age 38)	2016	2018	(Northern Ireland) Glenavon
12	Warren O'Hora	(Republic of Ireland)	CB	19 April 1999 (age 26)	2017	2018	(Republic of Ireland) Bohemians U19
3	Lorcan Fitzgerald	(Republic of Ireland)	LB	16 August 1993 (age 32)	2015	2018	(Republic of Ireland) St Patrick's Athletic
8	Stephen Best	(Republic of Ireland)	CB	15 March 1997 (age 28)	2015	2017	(Republic of Ireland) Bohemians U19
Midfielders
10	Keith Ward	(Republic of Ireland)	AM	12 October 1990 (age 35)	2017	2020	(Republic of Ireland) Derry City
15	Oscar Brennan	(Republic of Ireland)	CM	17 March 1996 (age 29)	2017	2018	(Republic of Ireland) Cabinteely
11	Georgie Poynton	(Republic of Ireland)	MF	8 September 1997 (age 28)	2017	2017	(Republic of Ireland) Dundalk
13	Dean Casey	(Republic of Ireland)	RW	15 December 1997 (age 28)	2017	2017	(Republic of Ireland) Bohemians U19
15	Eoin Wearen	(Republic of Ireland)	DM	2 October 1992 (age 33)	2015	2017	(England) West Ham United U23
6	Fuad Sule	(Republic of Ireland)	DM	20 January 1997 (age 29)	2017	2017	(Republic of Ireland) St Patrick's Athletic
21	Jamie Doyle	(Republic of Ireland)	LW	30 October 1993 (age 32)	2017	2017	(Republic of Ireland) Shelbourne
22	Patrick Kavanagh	(Republic of Ireland)	RW	29 December 1985 (age 40)	2014	2018	(Republic of Ireland) Derry City
18	Philip Gannon	(Republic of Ireland)	CM	11 October 1996 (age 29)	2019	2020	(Republic of Ireland) Longford Town
Forwards
9	Dinny Corcoran	(Republic of Ireland)	CF	13 February 1989 (age 36)	2017	2020	(Republic of Ireland) St Patrick's Athletic
24	Ismahil Akinade	(Nigeria)	CF	11 February 1994 (age 31)	2015	2017	(Republic of Ireland) Bray Wanderers
25	Kaleem Simon	(Republic of Ireland)	FW	16 September 1999 (age 26)	2017	2017	(Republic of Ireland) Longford Town

== Competitions ==
=== Premier Division ===
==== League table ====
Pos	Team	Pld	W	D	L	GF	GA	GD	Pts	Qualification or relegation
3	Shamrock Rovers	33	17	3	13	49	41	+8	54	Qualification for Europa League first qualifying round
4	Derry City	33	14	9	10	49	40	+9	51	Qualification for Europa League first qualifying round
5	Bohemians	33	14	5	14	36	40	−4	47	
6	Bray Wanderers	33	13	7	13	55	52	+3	46	
7	Limerick	33	10	10	13	41	51	−10	40	

Source: SSE Airtricity League, Soccerway
Rules for classification: 1) Points; 2) Goal difference; 3) Goals scored.

==== Results summary ====
Overall								Home						Away					
Pld	W	D	L	GF	GA	GD	Pts	W	D	L	GF	GA	GD	W	D	L	GF	GA	GD
33	14	5	14	36	40	−4	47	5	5	7	17	23	−6	9	0	7	19	17	+2

Last updated: 5 August 2020.
Source: Extratime.com

==== Results by matchday ====
Matchday	1	2	3	4	5	6	7	8	9	10	11	12	13	14	15	16	17	18	19	20	21	22	23	24	25	26	27	28	29	30	31	32	33
Ground	H	A	H	A	H	A	H	A	H	A	H	A	H	A	H	A	H	A	H	H	A	H	A	A	H	A	H	A	H	A	H	A	H
Result	L	L	W	W	D	W	L	L	L	L	W	L	L	W	L	W	D	W	W	L	L	L	W	W	D	L	D	W	W	L	D	W	W
Position																																	

A = Away; H = Home; W = Win; D = Draw; L = Loss
