= Andre Wright =

English footballer

Personal information
- Full name: Andre Antonio Wright
- Date of birth: 7 December 1996 (age 29)
- Place of birth: Sandwell, West Midlands, England
- Position: Forward

Team information
- Current team: Bedworth United

Youth career
- –2015: West Bromwich Albion

Senior career*
Years	Team	Apps	(Gls)
2015–2017	West Bromwich Albion	0	(0)
2015	→ Kidderminster Harriers (loan)	12	(1)
2015–2016	→ Torquay United (loan)	22	(3)
2016–2017	→ Coventry City (loan)	11	(2)
2017	Brighton & Hove Albion	0	(0)
2017–2018	Kidderminster Harriers	13	(1)
2018	Nuneaton Town	2	(0)
2018	Torquay United	6	(0)
2018–2019	Gloucester City	13	(0)
2019–2020	Bohemians	27	(13)
2021	Ayr United	5	(0)
2021	Sligo Rovers	12	(2)
2022	AFC Telford United	13	(0)
2022	Hereford	8	(0)
2022	Kettering Town	6	(0)
2022–2023	Stratford Town	32	(6)
2023–2024	Mickleover	10	(6)
2024	Stratford Town	8	(0)
2024–	Bedworth United	2	(1)
- * Club domestic league appearances and goals as of 14:13, 10 October 2024 (UTC)

Andre Antonio Wright (born 7 December 1996) is an English footballer who plays as a forward for Bedworth United. During his career Wright has played for clubs in England, Ireland and Scotland.

== Career ==
A product of West Bromwich Albion's academy, Wright was loaned out to Kidderminster Harriers for the first half of the 2015–16 season in order to gain experience of senior football. Wright scored his first senior goal in a 3–1 defeat to Wrexham on 18 August 2015, it was his only goal in 12 league appearances for Kidderminster. The loan spell at Kidderminster was cut short in November 2015 to allow Wright to join fellow National League relegation contenders Torquay United on loan, initially until 2 January 2016. The loan deal was extended until the end of the 2015–16 season, with Wright going on to score three goals in 22 league appearances to help Torquay survive relegation from the National League, at the expense of former club Kidderminster Harriers.

After featuring for West Brom's Under-23 side against Millwall in the EFL Trophy in August 2016, Wright was loaned out to Coventry City until 9 January 2017. Wright scored his first league goal for Coventry City in a 2–2 draw with AFC Wimbledon at the Ricoh Arena, in what would prove to be Tony Mowbray's final game as Coventry City manager.

On 17 January 2017, Wright agreed to join League Two side Yeovil Town on loan until the end of the season, but the deal collapsed on 18 January 2017, due to rules governing the number of clubs a player can represent in one season.

On 1 September 2017, after numerous trials with Football League sides, Wright opted to return to Kidderminster Harriers on a one-year deal.

In July 2019 it was announced that Andre had signed for League of Ireland Premier Division side Bohemians until the end of the 2019 season. Wright scored 4 goals in a single game for Bohs as they defeated fellow Dublin club UCD in August 2019. Andre Wright was named in the PFAI Team of the Year in 2020.

Wright signed for Scottish Championship side, Ayr United, on Burns' Day of 2021. Wright left Ayr at the end of the 2020–21 season. He spent some time on trial at Notts County during pre-season ahead of their 2021–22 season but was not offered a contract.

On 17 August 2021, it was announced that Wright had returned to the League of Ireland, signing for Sligo Rovers for the final 4 months of the season.

On 1 January 2022, Wright signed for National League North side AFC Telford United.

On 24 March 2022, Wright signed for National League North side Hereford on a non-contract basis. He was released at the end of the season after making eight league appearances.

On 29 June 2022, Wright joined fellow National League North club Kettering Town. In October 2022, he signed for Southern League Premier Division Central club Stratford Town. Having finished the 2022–23 season with Stratford Town, he joined Mickleover.

In June 2024, Wright returned to Stratford Town. In September 2024, he joined Bedworth United.

== Career statistics ==
As of match played on 15 October 2022

Appearances and goals by club, season and competition
Club	Division	Season	League		National Cup		League Cup		Europe		Other		Total	
Club	Division	Season	Apps	Goals	Apps	Goals	Apps	Goals	Apps	Goals	Apps	Goals	Apps	Goals
West Bromwich Albion	2015–16	Premier League	0	0	0	0	0	0	—		—		0	0
West Bromwich Albion	2016–17	Premier League	0	0	0	0	0	0	—		—		0	0
West Bromwich Albion	Total		0	0	0	0	0	0	—		—		0	0
Kidderminster Harriers (loan)	2015–16	National League	12	1	0	0	—		—		0	0	12	1
Torquay United (loan)	2015–16	National League	22	3	0	0	—		—		6 (Note: Appearances in the FA Trophy)	2	28	5
Coventry City (loan)	2016–17	EFL League One	11	2	1	0	0	0	—		0	0	12	2
Brighton & Hove Albion	2016–17	EFL Championship	0	0	0	0	0	0	—		0	0	0	0
Kidderminster Harriers	2017–18	National League North	8	0	3	1	—		—		1	0	12	1
Nuneaton Town	2017–18	National League North	2	0	—		—		—		—		2	0
Torquay United	2018–19	National League South	6	0	0	0	—		—		0	0	6	0
Gloucester City	2018–19	National League South	13	0	0	0	—		—		0	0	13	0
Bohemians	2019	League of Ireland Premier Division	10	5	4	2	1	0	—		1 (Note: Appearances in the Scottish Challenge Cup)	0	16	7
Bohemians	2020	League of Ireland Premier Division	17	8	1	1	—		1 (Note: Appearances in the UEFA Europa League)	0	—		19	9
Ayr United	2020–21	Scottish Championship	5	0	1	0	—		—		—		6	0
Sligo Rovers	2021	League of Ireland Premier Division	12	2	—		—		—		—		12	2
AFC Telford United	2021–22	National League North	13	0	—		—		—		—		13	0
Hereford	2021–22	National League North	8	0	—		—		—		—		8	0
Kettering Town	2022–23	National League North	6	0	1	0	—		—		0	0	7	0
Stratford Town	2022–23	SL Premier Division Central	1	0	—		—		—		0	0	1	0
Career total			146	21	11	4	1	0	1	0	8	2	167	27
