= Darragh Leahy =

Irish association footballer

Personal information
- Full name: Darragh John Leahy
- Date of birth: 15 April 1998 (age 28)
- Place of birth: Dublin, Republic of Ireland
- Height: 1.77 m (5 ft 10 in)
- Position: Defender

Team information
- Current team: Linfield
- Number: 33

Youth career
- –2015: St. Kevin's Boys
- 2015–2016: Coventry City

Senior career*
Years	Team	Apps	(Gls)
2016–2018	Coventry City	0	(0)
2016–2017	→ Nuneaton Town (loan)	7	(0)
2017	→ Nuneaton Town (loan)	0	(0)
2018–2019	Bohemians	49	(1)
2020–2023	Dundalk	83	(3)
2024–2025	Waterford	61	(5)
2026–	Linfield	18	(2)

International career^{‡}
2014	Republic of Ireland U16	5	(0)
2014–2015	Republic of Ireland U17	8	(0)
2016–2017	Republic of Ireland U19	8	(3)
2019–2020	Republic of Ireland U21	10	(0)
- * Club domestic league appearances and goals as of 15:31, 31 August 2026 (UTC) ‡ National team caps and goals as of 00:34, 18 February 2025 (UTC)

Darragh John Leahy (born 15 April 1998) is an Irish footballer who plays as a defender for NIFL Premiership club Linfield. His former clubs are Coventry City, Nuneaton Town, Bohemians, Dundalk and Waterford.

== Club career ==
=== Early career ===
Swords, County Dublin native Leahy grew up supporting Shelbourne and started playing his schoolboy football with top Dublin Academy St Kevin's Boys, before earning a move to the Academy of English side Coventry City in 2015.

=== Coventry City ===
Leahy was called up to the Coventry City first team squad during pre-season training in the summer of 2016, playing friendlies against Sturm Graz, Notts County and Norwich City.

==== Nuneaton Town loans ====
On 4 November 2016, he joined National League North side Nuneaton Town on a short-term loan. His loan spell was extended by another month on 11 January 2017, having made 8 appearances for the club up that point. The loan was cut short just 10 days later however, with Coventry recalling him with immediate affect. On 24 November 2017, he joined the club again on another month long loan spell.

=== Bohemians ===
On 2 January 2018, Leahy signed for League of Ireland Premier Division side Bohemians. On 14 April 2018, he scored his first career goal in senior football, a 99th-minute winner away to Shamrock Rovers in the Dublin Derby at Tallaght Stadium. He was named in the 2018 PFAI Premier Division Team of the Year by his fellow professionals.

=== Dundalk ===
On 12 December 2019, Leahy signed for League of Ireland Premier Division champions Dundalk ahead of the 2020 season. On 6 December 2020, he replaced Sean Gannon from the bench in a 4–2 win over Shamrock Rovers in the 2020 FAI Cup final at the Aviva Stadium. On 12 March 2021, he scored the winning penalty in the shootout as his side defeated Shamrock Rovers at Tallaght Stadium to win the 2021 President of Ireland's Cup. He spent 4 seasons with the club, scoring 3 goals in 112 appearances in all competitions, before leaving at the end of the 2023 season.

=== Waterford ===
Leahy signed for newly promoted League of Ireland Premier Division club Waterford on 13 December 2023. He scored his first goals for the club on 23 February 2024, scoring twice in a 4–1 win away to Drogheda United. On 12 November 2024, he signed a new contract with the club. On 21 November 2025, it was announced that Leahy would be departing Waterford after scoring 5 goals in 67 appearances during his 2 seasons with the club.

=== Linfield ===
On 14 January 2026, Leahy joined NIFL Premiership club Linfield on an 18-month-contract.

== International career ==
Leahy featured for his country right up to under-21 level.

== Style of play ==
Leahy can operate as a central defender or left-back.

== Career statistics ==
As of match played on 29 August 2026

Appearances and goals by club, season and competition
Club	Season	League			National Cup (Note: Includes FA Cup, FAI Cup & Irish Cup)		League Cup (Note: Includes EFL Cup, League of Ireland Cup & Northern Ireland Football League Cup)		Europe		Other		Total	
Club	Season	Division	Apps	Goals	Apps	Goals	Apps	Goals	Apps	Goals	Apps	Goals	Apps	Goals
Coventry City	2016–17	EFL League One	0	0	0	0	0	0	—		0 (Note: Appearance(s) in the EFL Trophy)	0	0	0
Coventry City	2017–18	EFL League Two	0	0	0	0	—		—		0	0	0	0
Coventry City	Total		0	0	0	0	0	0	—		0	0	0	0
Nuneaton Town (loan)	2016–17	National League North	7	0	—		—		—		1 (Note: Appearance(s) in the FA Trophy)	0	8	0
Nuneaton Town (loan)	2017–18	National League North	0	0	—		—		—		0	0	0	0
Bohemians	2018	LOI Premier Division	24	1	5	1	0	0	–		0 (Note: Appearance(s) in the Leinster Senior Cup)	0	29	2
Bohemians	2019	LOI Premier Division	25	0	2	0	0	0	–		0	0	27	0
Bohemians	Total		49	1	7	1	0	0	—		0	0	56	2
Dundalk	2020	LOI Premier Division	8	0	3	0	—		8 (Note: 1 appearances in the UEFA Champions League & 7 appearances in the UEFA Europa League)	0	—		19	0
Dundalk	2021	LOI Premier Division	23	0	4	0	—		6 (Note: Appearance(s) in the UEFA Europa Conference League)	0	1 (Note: Appearance in the President of Ireland's Cup)	0	34	0
Dundalk	2022	LOI Premier Division	28	3	1	0	—		—		—		29	3
Dundalk	2023	LOI Premier Division	24	0	2	0	—		4	0	0	0	0	0
Dundalk	Total		83	3	10	0	–		18	0	1	0	112	3
Waterford	2024	LOI Premier Division	33	2	2	0	—		—		1 (Note: Appearance(s) in the Munster Senior Cup)	0	36	2
Waterford	2025	LOI Premier Division	28	3	1	0	—		—		2 (Note: 1 appearance in the Munster Senior Cup; 1 appearance in the 2025 League of Ireland Premier Division Promotion/Relegation Playoff)	0	31	3
Waterford	Total		61	5	3	0	–		—		3	0	67	5
Linfield	2025–26	NIFL Premiership	14	1	1	0	2	0	—		1 (Note: Appearance in the 2026 NIFL Premiership European Playoff)	0	18	1
Linfield	2026–27	NIFL Premiership	4	1	0	0	0	0	2 (Note: Appearances in the UEFA Conference League)	0	0 (Note: Appearance in the County Antrim Shield)	0	6	1
Linfield	Total		18	2	1	0	2	0	2	0	1	0	24	2
Career total			218	11	21	1	2	0	20	0	7	0	267	12

== Honours ==
=== Club ===
Dundalk

- FAI Cup (1): 2020
- President of Ireland's Cup (1): 2021

=== Individual ===
- PFAI Premier Division Team of the Year (1): 2018
