= Keith Buckley (footballer) =

Irish footballer

Personal information
- Date of birth: 17 June 1993 (age 33)
- Place of birth: Dublin, Ireland
- Height: 5 ft 7 in (1.70 m)
- Position: Midfielder

Team information
- Current team: Dundalk
- Number: 18

Youth career
- 2007–2010: Belvedere
- 2010: Bohemians

Senior career*
Years	Team	Apps	(Gls)
2011–2016	Bohemians	153	(10)
2017	Bray Wanderers	25	(0)
2018–2021	Bohemians	99	(5)
2022	Blacktown Spartans		
2023–2025	Bohemians	54	(1)
2026–	Dundalk	34	(0)
- * Club domestic league appearances and goals as of 16:58, 10 November 2026 (UTC)

Keith Buckley (born 17 June 1993) is an Irish footballer who plays as a central midfielder for League of Ireland Premier Division club Dundalk.

== Career ==
Buckley was named in the PFAI Team of the Year in 2020.

On 2 December 2025, Buckley signed for recently promoted League of Ireland Premier Division club Dundalk ahead of the 2026 season.

== Personal life ==
He is the cousin of UFC fighter Conor McGregor.

== Career statistics ==
As of match played on 30 October 2026

Club	Season	League			National Cup		League Cup		Continental		Other		Total	
Club	Season	Division	Apps	Goals	Apps	Goals	Apps	Goals	Apps	Goals	Apps	Goals	Apps	Goals
Bohemians	2011	LOI Premier Division	29	3	5	0	1	0	2 (Note: Appearances in UEFA Europa League)	0	3 (Note: 1 appearance in Setanta Sports Cup & 2 appearances in Leinster Senior Cup)	0	40	3
Bohemians	2012	LOI Premier Division	20	1	2	0	1	0	2	0	2 (Note: 1 appearance in Setanta Sports Cup & 1 appearance in Leinster Senior Cup)	0	27	1
Bohemians	2013	LOI Premier Division	29	0	1	0	1	0	—		0 (Note: Appearances in Leinster Senior Cup)	0	31	0
Bohemians	2014	LOI Premier Division	16	1	3	0	4	0	—		0	0	23	1
Bohemians	2015	LOI Premier Division	29	3	2	0	1	0	—		3	1	35	4
Bohemians	2016	LOI Premier Division	30	2	2	0	2	0	—		3	0	37	2
Bohemians	Total		153	10	15	0	10	0	4	0	11	1	193	11
Bray Wanderers	2017	LOI Premier Division	25	0	1	0	2	0	—		2 (Note: 1 appearance in Leinster Senior Cup & 1 appearance in Scottish Challenge Cup)	0	30	0
Bohemians	2018	LOI Premier Division	29	1	4	0	0	0	—		2 (Note: Appearances in Scottish Challenge Cup)	0	35	1
Bohemians	2019	LOI Premier Division	24	1	3	1	1	0	—		0	0	28	2
Bohemians	2020	LOI Premier Division	17	1	1	0	—		1	0	—		19	1
Bohemians	2021	LOI Premier Division	29	2	3	2	—		6 (Note: Appearances in UEFA Europa Conference League)	0	—		38	4
Bohemians	Total		99	5	11	3	—		7	0	2	0	119	8
Blacktown Spartans	2022	NSW Division One			–		–		—		–			
Bohemians	2023	LOI Premier Division	27	0	3	0	–		—		1	0	31	0
Bohemians	2024	LOI Premier Division	0	0	0	0	–		—		0	0	0	0
Bohemians	2025	LOI Premier Division	27	1	2	0	–		—		0	0	29	1
Bohemians	Total		54	1	5	0	–		–		1	0	60	1
Dundalk	2026	LOI Premier Division	34	0	1	0	–		—		2	0	37	0
Career Total			365	16	33	3	13	0	11	0	18	1	440	20

== Honours ==
- Leinster Senior Cup (2): 2016, 2023
