= Keith Long =

Irish footballer and manager

Personal information
- Date of birth: 14 November 1973 (age 52)
- Place of birth: Dublin, Ireland

Senior career*
Years	Team	Apps	(Gls)
1990–1993	Stoke City	0	(0)
1993–1996	Dundalk	48	(1)
1996–2000	St Patrick's Athletic	59	(1)
2000–2005	Bray Wanderers	123	(0)
Total		230	(2)

Managerial career
- 2011–2012: Bray Wanderers
- 2014: Athlone Town
- 2014–2022: Bohemians
- 2023–2025: Waterford
- * Club domestic league appearances and goals

Keith Long (born 14 November 1973) is an Irish football manager and former footballer. He was most recently the manager of League of Ireland Premier Division team Waterford

Long is a former Bray Wanderers player, assistant manager and was previously caretaker manager before taking over in November 2011 from Pat Devlin.

Long also played for Stoke City before joining Dundalk in 1993 and then St Patrick's Athletic before joining Bray Wanderers in 2000 where he played 138 games before retiring in 2005.

His first league goal was the winner for Dundalk at Eamonn Deacy Park on 4 November 1995.

Long made a substitute appearance in the 1995–96 UEFA Cup at the Malmö Stadion

On 29 April 2014, he was named as manager of Athlone Town.

He could not prevent Athlone Town's relegation from the League of Ireland Premier Division and departed the club to become manager of Bohemians on 30 October 2014. On 30 August 2022, a day after a 3–1 home defeat to St Patrick's Athletic, he was sacked by Bohs without winning a major trophy during his 8 years at the club.

On 29 March 2023, Long was appointed manager of League of Ireland First Division club Waterford, before being relieved of his duties on April 19 2025.

== Managerial statistics ==
As of maych played on 18 April 2025

Team	From	To	Record				
Team	From	To	G	W	D	L	Win %
Bray Wanderers	1 December 2011	15 September 2012	33	7	9	17	21.21
Athlone Town	29 April 2014	25 October 2014	24	4	10	10	16.67
Bohemians	30 October 2014	30 August 2022	299	133	63	103	44.48
Waterford	29 March 2023	19 April 2025	91	44	14	33	48.35
Total			447	188	96	163	42.06

== Honours ==
=== As a player ===
==== St Patrick's Athletic ====
- League of Ireland Premier Division (1)
  - 1997–98

=== As a manager ===
==== Bohemians ====
- Leinster Senior Cup
  - 2015-16

=== As a manager ===
==== Waterford ====
- Munster Senior Cup
  - 2023-24
