= James Brown (footballer, born June 1998) =

Irish footballer (born 1998)

Personal information
- Date of birth: 4 June 1998 (age 28)
- Place of birth: Dublin, Ireland
- Position: Right back

Team information
- Current team: St Patrick's Athletic
- Number: 23

Youth career
- Shelbourne

Senior career*
Years	Team	Apps	(Gls)
2016–2018	Shelbourne	33	(2)
2019–2021	Drogheda United	75	(2)
2022–2023	Blackburn Rovers	1	(0)
2022–2023	→ Stockport County (loan)	16	(0)
2023	→ Doncaster Rovers (loan)	17	(0)
2023–2025	Ross County	58	(1)
2025–2026	Kilmarnock	15	(0)
2026–	St Patrick's Athletic	31	(1)
- * Club domestic league appearances and goals as of 01:45, 24 October 2026 (UTC)

James Brown (born 4 June 1998) is an Irish professional footballer who plays as a right back for League of Ireland Premier Division club St Patrick's Athletic.

== Career ==
Brown began his career with Shelbourne, joining the senior team in April 2016. He signed for Drogheda United for the 2019 season. He won the 2020 League of Ireland First Division title with Drogheda, and was later selected for the 2021 PFAI Premier Division Team of the Year, as well as being Drogheda's Supporters' Player of the Year. He served as Drogheda's captain.

In late 2021, he underwent trials with English clubs Blackburn Rovers and Bristol Rovers. He signed a contract with Blackburn Rovers in January 2022. He made his EFL Championship debut for Blackburn on the final day of the 2021–22 season, starting in the club's 2–1 defeat of Birmingham City. On 29 July 2022, Brown signed for EFL League Two club Stockport County on loan for the 2022–23 season. He moved on loan to Doncaster Rovers in January 2023.

On 7 July 2023, Brown joined Scottish Premiership club Ross County on a permanent deal. He left the club at the end of his contract in June 2025 following their relegation to the Scottish Championship.

On 30 August 2025, Brown signed for Scottish Premiership side Kilmarnock on a one-year-contract.

On 22 February 2026, Brown signed for League of Ireland Premier Division club St Patrick's Athletic on a long-term contract. On 9 August 2026, he scored his first goal for the club, the winner in a 2–1 victory over his former club Shelbourne at Tolka Park.

== Style of play ==
Brown has been described as an "attack-minded full-back" who "is competent with both feet, can either cut inside or take the defender down to the byline in order to deliver a cross".

== Career statistics ==
As of match played 23 October 2026

Appearances and goals by club, season and competition
Club	Season	League			National Cup		League Cup		Other		Total	
Club	Season	Division	Apps	Goals	Apps	Goals	Apps	Goals	Apps	Goals	Apps	Goals
Shelbourne	2016	LOI First Division	3	0	0	0	0	0	0 (Note: Appearances in the Leinster Senior Cup)	0	3	0
Shelbourne	2017	LOI First Division	14	1	2	0	1	0	3	0	20	1
Shelbourne	2018	LOI First Division	16	1	0	0	0	0	3	0	19	1
Shelbourne	Total		33	2	2	0	1	0	6	0	42	2
Drogheda United	2019	LOI First Division	23	0	2	0	1	0	3 (Note: Appearances in the 2019 League of Ireland First Division Promotion Playoffs)	0	29	0
Drogheda United	2020	LOI First Division	18	1	1	0	—		—		19	1
Drogheda United	2021	LOI Premier Division	34	1	1	0	—		—		35	1
Drogheda United	Total		75	2	4	0	1	0	3	0	83	2
Blackburn Rovers	2021–22	EFL Championship	1	0	0	0	—		—		0	0
Blackburn Rovers	2022–23	EFL Championship	0	0	—		—		—		0	0
Blackburn Rovers	Total		1	0	0	0	—		—		1	0
Stockport County (loan)	2022–23	EFL League Two	16	0	2	0	2	0	2 (Note: Appearances in the EFL Trophy)	0	22	0
Doncaster Rovers (loan)	2022–23	EFL League Two	17	0	—		—		—		17	0
Ross County	2023–24	Scottish Premiership	31	1	1	0	6	1	2 (Note: Appearances in the 2024 Scottish Premiership Playoffs)	0	40	2
Ross County	2024–25	Scottish Premiership	27	0	1	0	5	1	0 (Note: Appearances in the 2025 Scottish Premiership Playoffs)	0	33	1
Ross County	Total		58	1	2	0	11	2	2	0	73	3
Kilmarnock	2025–26	Scottish Premiership	15	0	0	0	1	0	1 (Note: Appearance in the Scottish Challenge Cup)	0	17	0
St Patrick's Athletic	2026	LOI Premier Division	31	1	2	0	—		0	0	33	1
Career Total			246	6	12	0	16	2	14	0	288	8

== Honours ==
Drogheda United

- League of Ireland First Division: 2020

Individual

- PFAI Premier Division Team of the Year: 2021
