= Gary O'Neill (footballer, born 1995) =

Irish footballer (born 1995)

Personal information
- Date of birth: 27 January 1995 (age 31)
- Place of birth: Tralee, County Kerry, Ireland
- Height: 1.80 m (5 ft 11 in)
- Position: Midfielder

Team information
- Current team: Shamrock Rovers
- Number: 16

Youth career
- Kingdom Boys
- 2009–2013: Wolverhampton Wanderers
- 2013–2014: Port Vale

Senior career*
Years	Team	Apps	(Gls)
2014	Port Vale	0	(0)
2014	→ Southport (loan)	4	(0)
2014–2015	Hereford United	0	(0)
2015–2019	UCD	116	(32)
2019–	Shamrock Rovers	151	(1)

International career
2010	Republic of Ireland U15	2	(0)
2011–2012	Republic of Ireland U17	6	(1)
- * Club domestic league appearances and goals as of 17:20, 9 November 2025 (UTC)

Gary O'Neill is an Irish professional footballer who plays as a midfielder for League of Ireland Premier Division club Shamrock Rovers.

O'Neill moved to England as a teenager and came through the Academy at Wolverhampton Wanderers. He was signed to Port Vale and played on loan at Southport. He returned to Ireland after leaving Hereford United in 2015, at which point he signed with UCD. He spent four years with UCD, helping the club to the League of Ireland First Division title in 2018, before he moved on to Shamrock Rovers. He was named in the PFAI Team of the Year three times whilst in the second tier. He won the Premier Division in 2020, 2021, 2022, 2023 and 2025. He also won the FAI Cup in 2019 and 2025, and the President of Ireland's Cup in 2022 and 2024.

== Career ==
=== Early career ===
A native of Caherslee, Tralee, County Kerry, O'Neill played for Kingdom Boys as a youth. His father, Tony, was a founding member of Tralee Dynamos. Following impressive displays in the Kennedy Cup, he joined the Academy at English Premier League club Wolverhampton Wanderers at Wolverhampton Wanderers. He spent four years with Wolves, where manager Mick McCarthy had an influx of Irish youngsters.

He joined Port Vale, though was released by manager Micky Adams at the end of the 2013–14 season without playing a first-team game. He spent a month on loan at Southport, playing four Conference games.

In September 2014, O'Neill joined Hereford United. He left Hereford in December 2014, when they were wound up as a club, with all league results and league appearances expunged. He was not paid his full wages.

=== UCD ===
O'Neill returned to Ireland in February 2015, signing with UCD where manager Pat Devlin was a friend of his father. He obtained a degree in sports management whilst at the university. He made his senior debut for the club in a Leinster Senior Cup tie against Dundalk on 10 February 2015. O'Neill scored on his league debut, a 3–0 victory over Cobh Ramblers on 7 March 2015. He was named on the PFAI Team of the Year for 2015, alongside teammates Thomas Boyle, Robbie Benson, and Ryan Swan. He was again voted onto the PFAI Team of the Year for 2016, along teammates Maxi Kouogun and Ryan Swan, with Limerick players making up the other eight names on the teamsheet. He was named onto the PFAI Team of the Year for the First Division for a third time in 2018, alongside teammates Liam Scales, Daire O'Connor and Georgie Kelly. He also won the division's Player of the Year award. UCD secured promotion that season as champions of the First Division.

=== Shamrock Rovers ===
In June 2019, O'Neill signed with Shamrock Rovers. Manager Stephen Bradley expressed his delight at the acquisition, highlighting O'Neill's fit within the team's playing style and his potential for further development. On 3 November 2019, he scored the winning penalty in the 2019 FAI Cup final in a shootout victory over Dundalk at the Aviva Stadium. He was an unused substitute in the 2021 President of Ireland's Cup final defeat to Dundalk. He did manage to play in the 2022 President of Ireland's Cup, which finished as a 1–1 draw, and converted his penalty in the 5–4 shootout victory. He went on to feature as a half-time substitution the 2024 President of Ireland's Cup, a 3–1 victory over St Patrick's Athletic. He missed 11 games of the 2024 campaign due to injury. He was not in the matchday squad for the 2025 FAI Cup final win over Cork City following a cancer diagnosis, but recorded a video message of support for his teammates in the run up to the game. Having recovered from cancer, O'Neill made his first appearance of the season on 23 October 2026, coming off the bench in a 4–0 win over Sligo Rovers that saw his side win the 2026 League of Ireland Premier Division.

== Style of play ==
O'Neill is renowned for his exceptional passing ability, boasting a passing accuracy above 90%. In 2019, he was the only player to complete over 2,000 passes in the season, averaging 71 completed passes per game, accounting for 13% of Shamrock Rovers' total passes.

== Personal life ==
In April 2026, O'Neill revealed that he had been diagnosed with testicular cancer in October 2025 and had undergone chemotherapy treatment, with the treatment and recovery period keeping him out of action for a long-term period.

== Career statistics ==
As of match played on 30 October 2026

Appearances and goals by club, season and competition
Club	Season	League			National Cup (Note: Includes FA Cup & FAI Cup)		League Cup (Note: Includes EFL Cup, Southern League Cup & League of Ireland Cup)		Europe		Other		Total	
Club	Season	Division	Apps	Goals	Apps	Goals	Apps	Goals	Apps	Goals	Apps	Goals	Apps	Goals
Port Vale	2013–14	League One	0	0	0	0	0	0	—		0	0	0	0
Southport (loan)	2013–14	Conference	4	0	—		—		—		—		4	0
Hereford United	2014–15	Southern League; Premier Division	0	0	0	0	1	1	—		2 (Note: Appearance(s) in the FA Trophy)	0	3	1
UCD	2015	LOI First Division	25	3	1	0	1	0	4 (Note: Appearance(s) in the UEFA Europa League)	0	3 (Note: 2 appearances in the 2015 League of Ireland First Division Playoffs; 1 appearance in the Leinster Senior Cup)	0	34	3
UCD	2016	LOI First Division	27	13	3	1	1	0	—		3 (Note: Appearance(s) in the Leinster Senior Cup)	2	34	16
UCD	2017	LOI First Division	18	5	0	0	1	1	—		2	2	21	8
UCD	2018	LOI First Division	27	9	3	0	1	1	—		0	0	31	10
UCD	2019	LOI Premier Division	19	2	—		2	0	—		—		21	2
UCD	Total		116	32	7	1	6	2	4	0	8	4	141	39
Shamrock Rovers	2019	LOI Premier Division	11	0	5	1	—		3	1	0	0	19	2
Shamrock Rovers	2020	LOI Premier Division	12	0	1	0	—		2	0	—		15	0
Shamrock Rovers	2021	LOI Premier Division	31	1	2	0	—		6 (Note: 2 appearances in the UEFA Champions League; 4 appearances in the UEFA Conference League)	0	0	0	39	1
Shamrock Rovers	2022	LOI Premier Division	31	0	2	0	—		13 (Note: 4 appearances in the UEFA Champions League; 4 appearances, 1 goal in the UEFA Europa League; 5 appearances in the UEFA Conference League)	1	1 (Note: Appearance in the President of Ireland's Cup)	0	47	1
Shamrock Rovers	2023	LOI Premier Division	28	0	1	0	—		4 (Note: 2 appearances in the UEFA Champions League; 2 appearances in the UEFA Europa League)	0	0	0	33	0
Shamrock Rovers	2024	LOI Premier Division	23	0	1	0	—		13 (Note: 4 appearances in the UEFA Champions League; 4 appearances in the UEFA Europa League; 5 appearances in the UEFA Conference League)	0	1	0	38	0
Shamrock Rovers	2025	LOI Premier Division	13	0	4	0	—		3 (Note: 2 appearances in the 2024–25 UEFA Conference League campaign; 1 appearance in the 2025–26 UEFA Conference League campaign)	0	0	0	20	0
Shamrock Rovers	2026	LOI Premier Division	2	0	0	0	—		0	0	0	0	2	0
Shamrock Rovers	Total		151	1	16	1	—		44	2	2	0	213	4
Career Total			271	33	23	2	7	3	48	2	12	4	361	44

== Honours ==
=== Club ===
UCD

- League of Ireland First Division (1): 2018

Shamrock Rovers

- League of Ireland Premier Division (6): 2020, 2021, 2022, 2023, 2025, 2026
- FAI Cup (2): 2019, 2025
- President of Ireland's Cup (2): 2022, 2024

=== Individual ===
- PFAI First Division Team of the Year (3): 2015, 2016, 2018
