= Rob Manley =

Irish footballer

Personal information
- Full name: Robert James Manley
- Date of birth: 24 August 1997 (age 29)
- Place of birth: Dublin, Ireland
- Height: 1.81 m (5 ft 11 in)
- Position: Striker

Team information
- Current team: Home Farm
- Number: 22

Youth career
- Home Farm
- 2015–2016: UCD

Senior career*
Years	Team	Apps	(Gls)
2016–2017	UCD	21	(2)
2018	Bohemians	3	(0)
2018	Drogheda United	4	(0)
2019	Cabinteely	27	(17)
2020–2021	Longford Town	49	(12)
2022	Bray Wanderers	18	(3)
2022–2023	Galway United	33	(9)
2024–	Home Farm	56	(31)
- * Club domestic league appearances and goals as of 15:07, 22 October 2026 (UTC)

Robert James Manley (born 24 August 1997) is an Irish footballer who plays as a striker for FAI National League club Home Farm.

Template played youth football with Home Farm and UCD before starting his professional career with UCD and going on to play for Bohemians, Drogheda United, Cabinteely, Longford Town, Bray Wanderers and Galway United.

== Career ==
=== UCD ===
On 18 March 2016, Manley made his debut for League of Ireland First Division club UCD against Waterford United at the UCD Bowl.

On 1 September 2017, Manley scored his first goal for the club in a 1–0 win over Wexford Youths.

=== Bohemians ===
Maley joined League of Ireland Premier Division side Bohemians for the 2018 season.

=== Drogheda United ===
Manley joined Drgoheda United for the second half of the 2018 season. At the end of the season Drogheda made it to the play-offs where they defeated Shelbourne in the semi-finals before losing to Finn Harps in the final.

=== Cabinteely ===
In February 2019, Manley signed for League of Ireland First Division club Cabinteely. On 15 March 2019, Maley scored a hat-trick in a 4–1 win over Drogheda United at United Park. Manley finished the season with 17 goals finishing as the top scorer in the 2019 First Division, which also saw him be named in the PFAI First Division Team of the Year. Cabinteely made the play-offs that year where they played Longford Town where Manley scored the winning penalty as the club won on penalties, before losing to Drogheda United.

=== Longford Town ===
On 14 November 2019, Manley signed for Longford Town for the 2020 season. In his first season with the club, Longford made it all the way to the play-off final, where Manley scored the only goal in a 1–0 win over Shelbourne to secure promotion to the Premier Division.

Manley re-signed for the 2021 season which was Longford's first season in the Premier Division in 5 years. Longford would only last one season in the top flight as they finished bottom of the league with only 15 points.

=== Bray Wanderers ===
On 13 December 2021, Manley signed for League of Ireland First Division club Bray Wanderers for the 2022 season.

=== Galway United ===
On 6 July 2022, Manley signed for Galway United midway through their 2022 season. Manley scored 5 goals in 10 games as Galway United made the play-offs, where Manley would score as the club defeated Longford Town in the semi-final, before losing to Waterford in the final.

Manley re-signed for the 2023 season, which would see Galway United win the First Divsion with a massive 98 points and gain promotion back to the Premier Division for the first time in 7 years.

=== Home Farm ===
On 13 January 2024, Manley signed for Leinster Senior League club Home Farm, returning to the club 10 years after playing in their youth ranks.

In 2026, Home Farm participated in the first season of the FAI National League. On 12 September 2026, Manley scored two goals in his first National League game in a 6–1 win away against Mervue United.

== Personal life ==
In 2022, Manley graduated from Technological University Dublin with a Bachelor of Business.

Manley has two brothers, Joe Manley and Sean Manley who are also footballers. He has previously played with Joe at UCD and Longford Town, and now plays with both of his brothers at Home Farm.

== Career statistics ==
As of match played 17 October 2026

Appearances and goals by club, season and competition
Club	Season	League			National cup (Note: Includes FAI Cup)		League cup (Note: Includes League of Ireland Cup & Charlie Cahill Cup)		Other		Total	
Club	Season	Division	Apps	Goals	Apps	Goals	Apps	Goals	Apps	Goals	Apps	Goals
UCD	2016	LOI First Division	1	0	0	0	1	0	0 (Note: Appearance(s) in Leinster Senior Cup)	0	2	0
UCD	2017	LOI First Division	20	2	1	0	1	0	3	0	25	2
UCD	Total		21	2	1	0	2	0	3	0	27	2
Bohemians	2018	LOI Premier Division	3	0	0	0	3	2	1	0	7	2
Drogheda United	2018	LOI First Division	4	0	1	0	0	0	1 (Note: Appearance in the 2018 League of ireland Play-Offs)	0	6	0
Cabinteely	2019	LOI First Division	27	17	1	1	0	0	3 (Note: Appearances in the 2019 League of ireland Play-Offs)	0	31	18
Longford Town	2020	LOI First Division	18	9	1	0	—		3 (Note: Appearances in the 2020 League of ireland Play-Offs)	1	22	10
Longford Town	2021	LOI Premier Division	31	3	2	0	—		—		33	3
Longford Town	Total		49	12	3	0	0	0	3	1	64	0
Bray Wanderers	2022	LOI First Division	18	3	0	0	—		—		18	3
Galway United	2022	LOI First Division	10	5	2	1	—		3 (Note: Appearances in the 2020 League of ireland Play-Offs)	1	15	7
Galway United	2023	LOI First Division	23	4	4	1	—		—		27	5
Galway United	Total		33	9	6	2	0	0	3	1	42	12
Home Farm	2024–25	Leinster Senior League Senior Division	23	10	—		3	1	3 (Note: 2 appearances, 2 goals in the Metropolitan Cup; 1 appearance in the FAI Intermediate Cup)	2	29	13
Home Farm	2025–26	Leinster Senior League Senior Division	25	18	—		3	0	6 (Note: 2 appearances, 1 goal in the Metropolitan Cup; 4 appearances, 4 goals in the FAI Intermediate Cup)	5	34	23
Home Farm	2026–27	Leinster Senior League Senior Division	3	0	—		—		—		3	0
Home Farm	2026	FAI National League	5	3	—		—		—		5	3
Home Farm	Total		56	31	0	0	6	1	9	7	71	39
Career total			210	72	12	3	11	3	23	9	256	87

== Honours ==
Galway United

- League of Ireland First Division: 2023
