= PFAI Team of the Year =

Annual Irish football award

The Professional Footballers' Association of Ireland Team of the Year (often called the PFAI Team of the Year, or simply the Team of the Year) is an annual award given to the group of eleven players voted by their fellow players as having performed the best over the season. There are two separate teams voted for; the League of Ireland Premier Division and a League of Ireland First Division.

== Winners ==
=== 2009 ===
==== Premier Division ====
Pos.	Player	Club
GK	Brian Murphy (Republic of Ireland)	Bohemians
DF	Patrick Sullivan (Republic of Ireland)	Shamrock Rovers
DF	Brian Shelley (Republic of Ireland)	Bohemians
DF	Ken Oman (Republic of Ireland)	Bohemians
DF	Conor Powell (Republic of Ireland)	Bohemians
MF	Chris Turner (Northern Ireland)	Dundalk
MF	Gary Deegan (Republic of Ireland)	Bohemians
MF	Joseph N'Do (Cameroon)	Bohemians
MF	Seán O'Connor (Republic of Ireland)	Shamrock Rovers
FW	Gary Twigg (Scotland)	Shamrock Rovers
FW	Raffaele Cretaro (Republic of Ireland)	Sligo Rovers

==== First Division ====
Pos.	Player	Club
GK	Dean Delany (Republic of Ireland)	Shelbourne
DF	Kenny Browne (Republic of Ireland)	Waterford
DF	Alan Carey (Republic of Ireland)	Waterford
DF	Evan McMillan (Republic of Ireland)	UCD
DF	Brian Shortall (Republic of Ireland)	UCD
MF	Shaun Williams (Republic of Ireland)	Sporting Fingal
MF	Ronan Finn (Republic of Ireland)	UCD
MF	David McAllister (Republic of Ireland)	Shelbourne
MF	Conan Byrne (Republic of Ireland)	Sporting Fingal
FW	Graham Cummins (Republic of Ireland)	Waterford
FW	Stephen O'Flynn (Republic of Ireland)	Limerick

=== 2010 ===
==== Premier Division ====
Pos.	Player	Club
GK	Alan Mannus (Northern Ireland)	Shamrock Rovers
DF	Conor Kenna (Republic of Ireland)	St Patrick's Athletic
DF	Gavin Peers (Republic of Ireland)	Sligo Rovers
DF	Brian Shelley (Republic of Ireland)	Bohemians
DF	Enda Stevens (Republic of Ireland)	Shamrock Rovers
MF	James Chambers (Republic of Ireland)	Shamrock Rovers
MF	Joseph N'Do (Cameroon)	Sligo Rovers
MF	Richie Ryan (Republic of Ireland)	Sligo Rovers
MF	Shaun Williams (Republic of Ireland)	Sporting Fingal
FW	Gary Twigg (Scotland)	Shamrock Rovers
FW	Pádraig Amond (Republic of Ireland)	Sligo Rovers

==== First Division ====
Pos.	Player	Club
GK	Ger Doherty (Republic of Ireland)	Derry City
DF	Alan Carey (Republic of Ireland)	Waterford
DF	Brian Gartland (Republic of Ireland)	Monaghan United
DF	Kevin Murray (Republic of Ireland)	Waterford
DF	Pat Purcell (Republic of Ireland)	Limerick
MF	David Cassidy (Republic of Ireland)	Shelbourne
MF	Shane Duggan (Republic of Ireland)	Cork City
MF	James McClean (Republic of Ireland)	Derry City
MF	Patrick McEleney (Republic of Ireland)	Derry City
FW	Graham Cummins (Republic of Ireland)	Cork City
FW	Philip Hughes (Republic of Ireland)	Monaghan United

=== 2011 ===
==== Premier Division ====
Pos.	Player	Club
GK	Gerard Doherty (Republic of Ireland)	Derry City
DF	Pat Sullivan (Republic of Ireland)	Shamrock Rovers
DF	Stewart Greacen (Scotland)	Derry City
DF	Craig Sives (Scotland)	Shamrock Rovers
DF	Enda Stevens (Republic of Ireland)	Shamrock Rovers
MF	Stephen Bradley (Republic of Ireland)	St Patrick's Athletic
MF	Daryl Kavanagh (Republic of Ireland)	St Patrick's Athletic
MF	Richie Ryan (Republic of Ireland)	Sligo Rovers
FW	Mark Quigley (Republic of Ireland)	Dundalk
FW	Éamon Zayed (Libya)	Derry City
FW	Eoin Doyle (Republic of Ireland)	Sligo Rovers

==== First Division ====
Pos.	Player	Club
GK	Mark McNulty (Republic of Ireland)	Cork City
DF	Danny Murphy (England)	Cork City
DF	Stephen Paisley (Republic of Ireland)	Shelbourne
DF	Pat Purcell (Republic of Ireland)	Limerick
DF	Lorcan Fitzgerald (Republic of Ireland)	Shelbourne
MF	Sean Brennan (Republic of Ireland)	Monaghan United
MF	Gearóid Morrissey (Republic of Ireland)	Cork City
MF	David Cassidy (Republic of Ireland)	Shelbourne
MF	Shane Duggan (Republic of Ireland)	Cork City
FW	Graham Cummins (Republic of Ireland)	Cork City
FW	Philip Hughes (Republic of Ireland)	Monaghan United

=== 2012 ===
==== Premier Division ====
Pos.	Player	Club
GK	Gary Rogers (Republic of Ireland)	Sligo Rovers
DF	Ger O'Brien (Republic of Ireland)	St Patrick's Athletic
DF	Jason McGuinness (Republic of Ireland)	Sligo Rovers
DF	Gavin Peers (Republic of Ireland)	Sligo Rovers
DF	Ian Bermingham (Republic of Ireland)	St Patrick's Athletic
MF	Sean O'Connor (Republic of Ireland)	St Patrick's Athletic
MF	Ronan Finn (Republic of Ireland)	Shamrock Rovers
MF	James Chambers (Republic of Ireland)	St Patrick's Athletic
MF	Stephen McLaughlin (Republic of Ireland)	Derry City
FW	Mark Quigley (Republic of Ireland)	Sligo Rovers
FW	Danny North (England)	Sligo Rovers

==== First Division ====
Pos.	Player	Club
GK	Packie Holden (Republic of Ireland)	Waterford
DF	Pat Purcell (Republic of Ireland)	Limerick
DF	Brian McCarthy (Republic of Ireland)	Athlone Town
DF	Shane Tracy (Republic of Ireland)	Limerick
DF	Noel Haverty (Republic of Ireland)	Longford Town
MF	Gary Dempsey (Republic of Ireland)	Waterford
MF	Keith Gillespie (Northern Ireland)	Longford Town
MF	Joe Gamble (Republic of Ireland)	Cork City
MF	Stephen Bradley (Republic of Ireland)	Limerick
FW	Sean Maguire (Republic of Ireland)	Waterford
FW	Rory Gaffney (Republic of Ireland)	Limerick

=== 2013 ===
==== Premier Division ====
Pos.	Player	Club
GK	Brendan Clarke (Republic of Ireland)	St Patrick's Athletic
DF	Ger O'Brien (Republic of Ireland)	St Patrick's Athletic
DF	Kenny Browne (Republic of Ireland)	St Patrick's Athletic
DF	Andy Boyle (Republic of Ireland)	Dundalk
DF	Ian Bermingham (Republic of Ireland)	St Patrick's Athletic
MF	Killian Brennan (Republic of Ireland)	St Patrick's Athletic
MF	Greg Bolger (Republic of Ireland)	St Patrick's Athletic
MF	Daryl Horgan (Republic of Ireland)	Cork City
MF	Richie Towell (Republic of Ireland)	Dundalk
FW	Patrick Hoban (Republic of Ireland)	Dundalk
FW	Rory Patterson (Northern Ireland)	Derry City

==== First Division ====
Pos.	Player	Club
GK	Paul Skinner (Republic of Ireland)	Athlone Town
DF	Gavin Kavanagh (Republic of Ireland)	Waterford
DF	Aidan Collins (Republic of Ireland)	Athlone Town
DF	Noel Haverty (Republic of Ireland)	Longford Town
DF	Tom King (Republic of Ireland)	Mervue United
MF	Mark Hughes (Republic of Ireland)	Athlone Town
MF	Graham Kelly (Republic of Ireland)	Athlone Town
MF	Barry O'Mahoney (Republic of Ireland)	Mervue United
MF	Ryan Manning (Republic of Ireland)	Mervue United
FW	Philip Gorman (Republic of Ireland)	Athlone Town
FW	David O'Sullivan (Republic of Ireland)	Longford Town

=== 2014 ===
==== Premier Division ====
Pos.	Player	Club
GK	Mark McNulty (Republic of Ireland)	Cork City
DF	Sean Gannon (Republic of Ireland)	Dundalk
DF	Andy Boyle (Republic of Ireland)	Dundalk
DF	Brian Gartland (Republic of Ireland)	Dundalk
DF	Ian Bermingham (Republic of Ireland)	St Patrick's Athletic
MF	Colin Healy (Republic of Ireland)	Cork City
MF	Richie Towell (Republic of Ireland)	Dundalk
MF	Daryl Horgan (Republic of Ireland)	Dundalk
FW	Patrick Hoban (Republic of Ireland)	Dundalk
FW	Christy Fagan (Republic of Ireland)	St Patrick's Athletic
FW	Mark O'Sullivan (Republic of Ireland)	Cork City

==== First Division ====
Pos.	Player	Club
GK	Graham Doyle (Republic of Ireland)	Wexford
DF	Pat Sullivan (Republic of Ireland)	Longford Town
DF	Paddy Barrett (Republic of Ireland)	Galway
DF	Lee Desmond (Republic of Ireland)	Shelbourne
DF	Colm Horgan (Republic of Ireland)	Galway
MF	Ryan Connolly (Republic of Ireland)	Galway
MF	Dylan Connolly (Republic of Ireland)	Shelbourne
MF	Stephen Rice (Republic of Ireland)	Longford Town
FW	Gary Shaw (Republic of Ireland)	Longford Town
FW	Danny Furlong (Republic of Ireland)	Wexford
FW	David O'Sullivan (Republic of Ireland)	Longford Town

=== 2015 ===
==== Premier Division ====
Pos.	Player	Club
GK	Micheál Schlingermann (Republic of Ireland)	Drogheda United
DF	Sean Gannon (Republic of Ireland)	Dundalk
DF	Brian Gartland (Republic of Ireland)	Dundalk
DF	Andy Boyle (Republic of Ireland)	Dundalk
DF	Dane Massey (Republic of Ireland)	Dundalk
MF	James Chambers (Republic of Ireland)	St Patrick's Athletic
MF	Richie Towell (Republic of Ireland)	Dundalk
MF	Stephen O'Donnell (Republic of Ireland)	Dundalk
FW	Daryl Horgan (Republic of Ireland)	Dundalk
FW	Brandon Miele (Republic of Ireland)	Shamrock Rovers
FW	Mark O'Sullivan (Republic of Ireland)	Cork City

==== First Division ====
Pos.	Player	Club
GK	Graham Doyle (Republic of Ireland)	Wexford
DF	Thomas Boyle (Republic of Ireland)	UCD
DF	Gary Delaney (Republic of Ireland)	Wexford
DF	Damien McNulty (Republic of Ireland)	Finn Harps
DF	Evan Osam (Republic of Ireland)	Shelbourne
MF	Robbie Benson (Republic of Ireland)	UCD
MF	Gary O'Neill (Republic of Ireland)	UCD
MF	Andy Mulligan (Republic of Ireland)	Wexford
FW	Ryan Swan (Republic of Ireland)	UCD
FW	Dylan McGlade (Republic of Ireland)	Shelbourne
FW	Danny Furlong (Republic of Ireland)	Wexford

=== 2016 ===
==== Premier Division ====
Pos.	Player	Club
GK	Ger Doherty (Republic of Ireland)	Derry City
DF	Sean Gannon (Republic of Ireland)	Dundalk
DF	Kenny Browne (Republic of Ireland)	Cork City
DF	Andy Boyle (Republic of Ireland)	Dundalk
DF	Kevin O'Connor (Republic of Ireland)	Cork City
MF	Stephen O'Donnell (Republic of Ireland)	Dundalk
MF	Greg Bolger (Republic of Ireland)	Cork City
MF	Patrick McEleney (Republic of Ireland)	Dundalk
FW	Daryl Horgan (Republic of Ireland)	Dundalk
FW	Sean Maguire (Republic of Ireland)	Cork City
FW	David McMillan (Republic of Ireland)	Dundalk

==== First Division ====
Pos.	Player	Club
GK	Freddy Hall (Bermuda)	Limerick
DF	Maxi Kouogun (Republic of Ireland)	UCD
DF	Paudie O'Connor (Republic of Ireland)	Limerick
DF	Shane Tracy (Republic of Ireland)	Limerick
DF	Robbie Williams (England)	Limerick
MF	Shane Duggan (Republic of Ireland)	Limerick
MF	Gary O'Neill (Republic of Ireland)	UCD
MF	Lee Lynch (Republic of Ireland)	Limerick
FW	Aaron Greene (Republic of Ireland)	Limerick
FW	Ryan Swan (Republic of Ireland)	UCD
FW	Chris Mulhall (Republic of Ireland)	Limerick

=== 2017 ===
==== Premier Division ====
Pos.	Player	Club
GK	Ger Doherty (Republic of Ireland)	Derry City
DF	Sean Gannon (Republic of Ireland)	Dundalk
DF	Niclas Vemmelund (Denmark)	Dundalk
DF	Ryan Delaney (Republic of Ireland)	Cork City
DF	Trevor Clarke (Republic of Ireland)	Shamrock Rovers
MF	Aaron McEneff (Northern Ireland)	Derry City
MF	Patrick McEleney (Republic of Ireland)	Dundalk
MF	Gearóid Morrissey (Republic of Ireland)	Cork City
FW	David McMillan (Republic of Ireland)	Dundalk
FW	Ronan Murray (Republic of Ireland)	Galway United
FW	Sean Maguire (Republic of Ireland)	Cork City

==== First Division ====
Pos.	Player	Club
GK	Niall Corbet (Republic of Ireland)	UCD
DF	Daniel O'Reilly (Republic of Ireland)	Longford Town
DF	Kenny Browne (Republic of Ireland)	Waterford
DF	Chris McCarthy (Republic of Ireland)	Cobh Rambkers
DF	Evan Osam (Republic of Ireland)	UCD
MF	Gary Comerford (Republic of Ireland)	Waterford
MF	Greg Sloggett (Republic of Ireland)	UCD
MF	Kieran Marty Waters (Republic of Ireland)	Cabinteely
MF	Derek Daly (Republic of Ireland)	Waterford
FW	David McDaid (Republic of Ireland)	Waterford
FW	Georgie Kelly (Republic of Ireland)	UCD

=== 2018 ===
==== Premier Division ====
Pos.	Player	Club
GK	Shane Supple (Republic of Ireland)	Bohemians
DF	Sean Gannon (Republic of Ireland)	Dundalk
DF	Seán Hoare (Republic of Ireland)	Dundalk
DF	Seán McLoughlin (Republic of Ireland)	Cork City
DF	Darragh Leahy (Republic of Ireland)	Bohemians
MF	Chris Shields (Republic of Ireland)	Dundalk
MF	Bastien Héry (Madagascar)	Waterford
MF	Robbie Benson (Republic of Ireland)	Dundalk
FW	Kieran Sadlier (Republic of Ireland)	Cork City
FW	Patrick Hoban (Republic of Ireland)	Dundalk
FW	Michael Duffy (Republic of Ireland)	Dundalk

==== First Division ====
Pos.	Player	Club
GK	Dean Delany (Republic of Ireland)	Shelbourne
DF	Conor Kane (Republic of Ireland)	Drogheda United
DF	Daniel O'Reilly (Republic of Ireland)	Longford Town
DF	Liam Scales (Republic of Ireland)	UCD
DF	Derek Prendergast (Republic of Ireland)	Shelbourne
MF	Sean Brennan (Republic of Ireland)	Drogheda United
MF	Gary O'Neill (Republic of Ireland)	UCD
MF	Daire O'Connor (Republic of Ireland)	UCD
FW	David O'Sullivan (Republic of Ireland)	Shelbourne
FW	Georgie Kelly (Republic of Ireland)	UCD
FW	Dylan McGlade (Republic of Ireland)	Longford Town

=== 2019 ===
==== Premier Division ====
Pos.	Player	Club
GK	Alan Mannus (Northern Ireland)	Shamrock Rovers
DF	Sean Gannon (Republic of Ireland)	Dundalk
DF	Seán Hoare (Republic of Ireland)	Dundalk
DF	Lee Grace (Republic of Ireland)	Shamrock Rovers
DF	Seán Kavanagh (Republic of Ireland)	Shamrock Rovers
MF	Danny Mandroiu (Republic of Ireland)	Bohemians
MF	Chris Shields (Republic of Ireland)	Dundalk
MF	Jack Byrne (Republic of Ireland)	Shamrock Rovers
FW	David Parkhouse (Northern Ireland)	Derry City
FW	Patrick Hoban (Republic of Ireland)	Dundalk
FW	Michael Duffy (Republic of Ireland)	Dundalk

==== First Division ====
Pos.	Player	Club
GK	Lee Steacy (Republic of Ireland)	Longford Town
DF	Anthony Breslin (Republic of Ireland)	Longford Town
DF	Luke Byrne (Republic of Ireland)	Shelbourne
DF	Conor Kenna (Republic of Ireland)	Longford Town
DF	Shane Elworthy (Republic of Ireland)	Longford Town
MF	Ryan Brennan (Republic of Ireland)	Shelbourne
MF	Sean Brennan (Republic of Ireland)	Drogheda United
MF	Dylan McGlade (Republic of Ireland)	Bray Wanderers
FW	Dean Byrne (Republic of Ireland)	Longford Town
FW	Chris Lyons (Republic of Ireland)	Drogheda United
FW	Rob Manley (Republic of Ireland)	Cabinteely

=== 2020 ===
==== Premier Division ====
Pos.	Player	Club
GK	Alan Mannus (Northern Ireland)	Shamrock Rovers
DF	Andy Lyons (Republic of Ireland)	Bohemians
DF	Roberto Lopes (Cape Verde)	Shamrock Rovers
DF	Lee Grace (Republic of Ireland)	Shamrock Rovers
DF	Tyreke Wilson (Republic of Ireland)	Waterford
MF	Keith Buckley (Republic of Ireland)	Bohemians
MF	Aaron McEneff (Republic of Ireland)	Shamrock Rovers
MF	Jack Byrne (Republic of Ireland)	Shamrock Rovers
FW	Danny Grant (Republic of Ireland)	Bohemians
FW	Andre Wright (England)	Bohemians
FW	Michael Duffy (Republic of Ireland)	Dundalk

==== First Division ====
Pos.	Player	Club
GK	Brian Maher (Republic of Ireland)	Bray Wanderers
DF	James Brown (Republic of Ireland)	Drogheda United
DF	Killian Cantwell (Republic of Ireland)	Bray Wanderers
DF	Hugh Douglas (Republic of Ireland)	Drogheda United
DF	Conor Kane (Republic of Ireland)	Drogheda United
MF	Shane Duggan (Republic of Ireland)	Galway United
MF	Brandon Kavanagh (Republic of Ireland)	Shamrock Rovers II
MF	Liam Kerrigan (Republic of Ireland)	UCD
FW	Colm Whelan (Republic of Ireland)	UCD
FW	Mark Doyle (Republic of Ireland)	Drogheda United
FW	Yoyo Mahdy (Republic of Ireland)	UCD

=== 2021 ===
==== Premier Division ====
Pos.	Player	Club
GK	James Talbot (Republic of Ireland)	Bohemians
DF	James Brown (Republic of Ireland)	Drogheda United
DF	Roberto Lopes (Cape Verde)	Shamrock Rovers
DF	Liam Scales (Republic of Ireland)	Shamrock Rovers
DF	Ronan Boyce (Republic of Ireland)	Derry City
MF	Chris Forrester (Republic of Ireland)	St Patrick's Athletic
MF	Dawson Devoy (Republic of Ireland)	Bohemians
MF	Will Patching (England)	Derry City/Dundalk
FW	Rory Gaffney (Republic of Ireland)	Shamrock Rovers
FW	Georgie Kelly (Republic of Ireland)	Bohemians
FW	Liam Burt (Scotland)	Bohemians

==== First Division ====
Pos.	Player	Club
GK	Brendan Clarke (Republic of Ireland)	Shelbourne
DF	John Ross Wilson (Republic of Ireland)	Shelbourne
DF	Luke Byrne (Republic of Ireland)	Shelbourne
DF	Ally Gilchrist (Scotland)	Shelbourne
DF	Marc Ludden (Republic of Ireland)	Treaty United
MF	Brandon Kavanagh (Republic of Ireland)	Bray Wanderers
MF	Paul Doyle (Republic of Ireland)	UCD
MF	Ryan Brennan (Republic of Ireland)	Shelbourne
FW	Liam Kerrigan (Republic of Ireland)	UCD
FW	Michael O'Connor (Republic of Ireland)	Shelbourne
FW	Colm Whelan (Republic of Ireland)	UCD

=== 2022 ===
==== Premier Division ====
Pos.	Player	Club
GK	Brian Maher (Republic of Ireland)	Derry City
DF	Cameron Dummigan (Northern Ireland)	Derry City
DF	Mark Connolly (Republic of Ireland)	Dundalk/Derry City
DF	Joe Redmond (Republic of Ireland)	St Patrick's Athletic
DF	Andy Lyons (Republic of Ireland)	Shamrock Rovers
MF	Will Patching (England)	Derry City
MF	Jack Byrne (Republic of Ireland)	Shamrock Rovers
MF	Chris Forrester (Republic of Ireland)	St Patrick's Athletic
FW	Aidan Keena (Republic of Ireland)	Sligo Rovers
FW	Rory Gaffney (Republic of Ireland)	Shamrock Rovers
FW	Seán Boyd (Republic of Ireland)	Shelbourne

==== First Division ====
Pos.	Player	Club
GK	David Harrington (Republic of Ireland)	Cork City
DF	Kevin O'Connor (Republic of Ireland)	Cork City
DF	Killian Brouder (Republic of Ireland)	Galway United
DF	Ally Gilchrist (Scotland)	Cork City
DF	Dylan Barnett (Republic of Ireland)	Longford Town
MF	Junior Quitirna (Guinea-Bissau)	Waterford
MF	Barry Coffey (Republic of Ireland)	Cork City
MF	Aaron Bolger (Republic of Ireland)	Cork City
FW	Enda Curran (Republic of Ireland)	Treaty United
FW	Stephen Walsh (Republic of Ireland)	Galway United
FW	Phoenix Patterson (Scotland)	Waterford

=== 2023 ===
==== Premier Division ====
Pos.	Player	Club
GK	Conor Kearns (Republic of Ireland)	Shelbourne
DF	Archie Davies (England)	Dundalk
DF	Sam Curtis (Republic of Ireland)	St Patrick's Athletic
DF	Roberto Lopes (Cape Verde)	Shamrock Rovers
DF	Ben Doherty (Northern Ireland)	Derry City
MF	Will Patching (England)	Derry City
MF	Chris Forrester (Republic of Ireland)	St Patrick's Athletic
MF	James Clarke (Republic of Ireland)	Bohemians
FW	Jack Moylan (Republic of Ireland)	Shelbourne
FW	Jonathan Afolabi (Republic of Ireland)	Bohemians
FW	Ruairí Keating (Republic of Ireland)	Cork City

==== First Division ====
Pos.	Player	Club
GK	Brendan Clarke (Republic of Ireland)	Galway United
DF	Giles Phillips (United States)	Waterford
DF	Killian Brouder (Republic of Ireland)	Galway United
DF	Rob Slevin (Republic of Ireland)	Galway United
DF	Ryan Burke (Republic of Ireland)	Waterford
MF	Ed McCarthy (Republic of Ireland)	Galway United
MF	David Hurley (Republic of Ireland)	Galway United
MF	Jack Doherty (Republic of Ireland)	Cobh Ramblers
FW	Frantz Pierrot (Haiti)	Athlone Town
FW	Ronan Coughlan (Republic of Ireland)	Waterford
FW	Stephen Walsh (Republic of Ireland)	Galway United

==== Women's Premier Division ====
Pos.	Player	Club
GK	Niamh Reid Burke (Republic of Ireland)	Peamount United
DF	Lia O'Leary (Republic of Ireland)	Shamrock Rovers
DF	Jetta Berrill (Republic of Ireland)	Peamount United
DF	Jessica Hennessy (Republic of Ireland)	Shamrock Rovers
DF	Jessica Gargan (Republic of Ireland)	Shamrock Rovers
MF	Alex Kavanagh (Republic of Ireland)	Shelbourne
MF	Karen Duggan (Republic of Ireland)	Peamount United
MF	Sadhbh Doyle (Republic of Ireland)	Peamount United
FW	Dana Scheriff (United States)	Athlone Town
FW	Erin McLaughlin (Republic of Ireland)	Peamount United
FW	Madie Gibson (United States)	Athlone Town

=== 2024 ===
==== Premier Division ====
Pos.	Player	Club
GK	Brendan Clarke (Republic of Ireland)	Galway United
DF	Joe Redmond (Republic of Ireland)	St Patrick's Athletic
DF	Paddy Barrett (Republic of Ireland)	Shelbourne
DF	Mark Connolly (Republic of Ireland)	Derry City
DF	Josh Honohan (Republic of Ireland)	Shamrock Rovers
MF	Dylan Watts (Republic of Ireland)	Shamrock Rovers
MF	Mark Coyle (Republic of Ireland)	Shelbourne
MF	Michael Duffy (Republic of Ireland)	Derry City
FW	Pádraig Amond (Republic of Ireland)	Waterford
FW	Patrick Hoban (Republic of Ireland)	Derry City
FW	Johnny Kenny (Republic of Ireland)	Shamrock Rovers

==== First Division ====
Pos.	Player	Club
GK	Bradley Wade (England)	Cork City
DF	Cian Coleman (Republic of Ireland)	Cork City
DF	Éanna Clancy (Republic of Ireland)	UCD
DF	Charlie Lyons (Republic of Ireland)	Cork City
DF	Evan McLaughlin (Republic of Ireland)	Cork City
MF	Seán Brennan (Republic of Ireland)	UCD
MF	Greg Bolger (Republic of Ireland)	Cork City
MF	Cathal O'Sullivan (Republic of Ireland)	Cork City
FW	Dean Ebbe (Republic of Ireland)	Athlone Town
FW	Ryan Kelliher (Republic of Ireland)	Kerry
FW	Aaron Dobbs (Republic of Ireland)	Wexford

==== Women's Premier Division ====
Pos.	Player	Club
GK	Jayne Merren (Republic of Ireland)	Wexford
DF	Keeva Keenan (Republic of Ireland)	Shelbourne
DF	Pearl Slattery (Republic of Ireland)	Shelbourne
DF	Jesi Rossman (United States)	Athlone Town
DF	Eve Dossen (Republic of Ireland)	Galway United
MF	Noelle Murray (Republic of Ireland)	Shelbourne
MF	Alex Kavanagh (Republic of Ireland)	Shelbourne
MF	Ellen Dolan (Republic of Ireland)	Peamount United
FW	Madie Gibson (United States)	Athlone Town
FW	Julie-Ann Russell (Republic of Ireland)	Galway United
FW	Joy Ralph (Republic of Ireland)	Shamrock Rovers

=== 2025 ===
==== Premier Division ====
Pos.	Player	Club
GK	Luke Dennison (United States)	Drogheda United
DF	Paddy Barrett (Republic of Ireland)	Shelbourne
DF	Roberto Lopes (Cape Verde)	Shamrock Rovers
DF	Conor Keeley (Republic of Ireland)	Drogheda United
DF	Josh Honohan (Republic of Ireland)	Shamrock Rovers
MF	Dawson Devoy (Republic of Ireland)	Bohemians
MF	Matt Healy (Republic of Ireland)	Shamrock Rovers
MF	Graham Burke (Republic of Ireland)	Shamrock Rovers
FW	Michael Duffy (Republic of Ireland)	Derry City
FW	Pádraig Amond (Republic of Ireland)	Waterford
FW	Owen Elding (England)	Sligo Rovers

==== First Division ====
Pos.	Player	Club
GK	Paul Martin (Republic of Ireland)	Wexford
DF	Max Murphy (Republic of Ireland)	Bray Wanderers
DF	Vinnie Leonard (Republic of Ireland)	Dundalk
DF	Shane Griffin (Republic of Ireland)	Cobh Ramblers
DF	Sean Keogh (Republic of Ireland)	Dundalk
MF	Barry Coffey (Republic of Ireland)	Cobh Ramblers
MF	Harry Groome (Republic of Ireland)	Dundalk
MF	Lee Devitt (Republic of Ireland)	Treaty United
FW	Billy O'Neill (Republic of Ireland)	Bray Wanderers
FW	Mikie Rowe (Republic of Ireland)	Wexford
FW	Daryl Horgan (Republic of Ireland)	Dundalk

==== Women's Premier Division ====
Pos.	Player	Club
GK	Megan Plaschko (United States)	Athlone Town
DF	Aoibheann Costello (Republic of Ireland)	Galway United
DF	Kayleigh Shine (Republic of Ireland)	Athlone Town
DF	Maria Reynolds (Republic of Ireland)	Shamrock Rovers
DF	Mary Phillips (Republic of Ireland)	Peamount United
MF	Isabella Flocchini (United States)	Treaty United
MF	Hannah Waesch (United States)	Athlone Town
MF	Ellen Molloy (Republic of Ireland)	Wexford
FW	Madie Gibson (United States)	Athlone Town
FW	Kelly Brady (United States)	Athlone Town
FW	Mackenzie Anthony (United States)	Shelbourne

=== 2026 ===
==== Premier Division ====
Pos.	Player	Club
GK	Joseph Anang (Ghana)	St Patrick's Athletic
DF	Tunmise Sobowale (Republic of Ireland)	Shamrock Rovers
DF	Joe Redmond (Republic of Ireland)	St Patrick's Athletic
DF	Roberto Lopes (Cape Verde)	Shamrock Rovers
DF	Luke Turner (Republic of Ireland)	St Patrick's Athletic
MF	Kian Leavy (Republic of Ireland)	St Patrick's Athletic
MF	Dawson Devoy (Republic of Ireland)	Bohemians
MF	Graham Burke (Republic of Ireland)	Shamrock Rovers
FW	Daryl Horgan (Republic of Ireland)	Dundalk
FW	Tommy Lonergan (Republic of Ireland)	Waterford
FW	Michael Duffy (Republic of Ireland)	Derry City

==== First Division ====
Pos.	Player	Club
GK	Conor Brann (Republic of Ireland)	Cork City
DF	Alain Kizenga (Republic of Ireland)	Bray Wanderers
DF	Fiacre Kelleher (Republic of Ireland)	Cork City
DF	Charlie Lyons (Republic of Ireland)	Cork City
DF	Conor Drinan (Republic of Ireland)	Cork City
MF	Ben McCormack (Republic of Ireland)	Bray Wanderers
MF	Louis Dignam (Republic of Ireland)	UCD
MF	Cillian Murphy (Republic of Ireland)	Cork City
FW	Sean Maguire (Republic of Ireland)	Cork City
FW	Ruairí Keating (Republic of Ireland)	Cork City
FW	Hans Mpongo (Netherlands)	Cork City

==== Women's Premier Division ====
Pos.	Player	Club
GK	Mya Sanchez (United States)	Shelbourne
DF	Therese Kinnevey (Republic of Ireland)	Shamrock Rovers
DF	Pearl Slattery (Republic of Ireland)	Shelbourne
DF	Kayleigh Shine (Republic of Ireland)	Athlone Town
DF	Aoibheann Costello (Republic of Ireland)	Galway United
MF	Alex Kavanagh (Republic of Ireland)	Shelbourne
MF	Hannah Waesch (United States)	Athlone Town
MF	Madison McGuane (Republic of Ireland)	Treaty United
FW	Emma Doherty (Republic of Ireland)	Galway United
FW	Dana Scheriff (United States)	Athlone Town
FW	Katie Lawlee (Republic of Ireland)	Treaty United

== See also ==
- PFAI Players' Player of the Year
- PFAI Young Player of the Year
