= Charlie Lyons (footballer) =

Irish footballer (born 2000)

Personal information
- Date of birth: 26 March 2000 (age 26)
- Place of birth: Cork, Ireland
- Height: 1.88 m (6 ft 2 in)
- Position: Defender

Youth career
- Innishvilla
- –2018: Preston North End

Senior career*
| Years | Team | Apps | (Gls) |
| 2019–2021 | Cobh Ramblers | 56 | (8) |
| 2022 | Galway United | 25 | (1) |
| 2023 | Cobh Ramblers | 33 | (2) |
| 2024–2026 | Cork City | 89 | (7) |
- * Club domestic league appearances and goals as of 21:46, 18 October 2026

Charlie Lyons (born 26 March 2000) is an Irish footballer who plays as a defender, most recently for Cork City.

== Early life ==
Lyons was born on 26 March 2000 in Cork, Ireland. A native of Innishannon, he played gaelic football with Lawton and the Shark growing up.

== Career ==
As a youth player, Lyons joined the youth academy of Irish side Innishvilla. Subsequently, he joined the youth academy of English side Preston North End. In 2019, he signed for Irish side Cobh Ramblers. He signed for Irish side Galway United ahead of their 2022 season, helping the club reach the promotion play-offs. Following his stint there, he signed for Irish side Cork City in 2024, helping the club achieve promotion from the second tier to the top flight.

== Career statistics ==
As of match played on 9 October 2026

Appearances and goals by club, season and competition
| Club | Season | League | | | National Cup (Note: Includes FAI Cup) | | League Cup (Note: Includes League of Ireland Cup) | | Other | | Total | |
| Club | Season | Division | Apps | Goals | Apps | Goals | Apps | Goals | Apps | Goals | Apps | Goals |
|---|---|---|---|---|---|---|---|---|---|---|---|---|
| Cobh Ramblers | 2019 | LOI First Division | 22 | 2 | 1 | 0 | 2 | 0 | 1 (Note: Appearance(s) in the Munster Senior Cup) | 0 | 26 | 2 |
| Cobh Ramblers | 2020 | LOI First Division | 18 | 4 | 1 | 0 | 1 | 0 | 1 | 0 | 21 | 4 |
| Cobh Ramblers | 2021 | LOI First Division | 16 | 2 | 2 | 0 | — | | — | | 18 | 2 |
| Cobh Ramblers | Total | | 56 | 8 | 4 | 0 | 3 | 0 | 2 | 0 | 65 | 8 |
| Galway United | 2022 | LOI First Division | 25 | 1 | 2 | 0 | — | | 2 (Note: Appearances in the 2022 League of Ireland Premier Division Promotion Playoffs) | 0 | 29 | 1 |
| Cobh Ramblers | 2023 | LOI First Division | 33 | 2 | 1 | 0 | — | | 4 (Note: 3 appearances in the 2023 League of Ireland Premier Division Promotion Playoffs; 1 appearance in the Munster Senior Cup) | 0 | 38 | 2 |
| Cork City | 2024 | LOI First Division | 33 | 5 | 2 | 0 | — | | 0 | 0 | 35 | 5 |
| Cork City | 2025 | LOI Premier Division | 28 | 1 | 2 | 0 | — | | 1 | 0 | 31 | 1 |
| Cork City | 2026 | LOI First Division | 28 | 1 | 1 | 0 | — | | 0 | 0 | 29 | 1 |
| Cork City | Total | | 89 | 7 | 5 | 0 | — | | 1 | 0 | 95 | 7 |
| Career Total | | | 203 | 18 | 12 | 0 | 3 | 0 | 9 | 0 | 227 | 18 |

== Honours ==
=== Club ===
Cobh Ramblers

- Munster Senior Cup (1): 2022–23

Cork City

- League of Ireland First Division (2): 2024, 2026

=== Individual ===
- PFAI First Division Team of the Year (2): 2024, 2026
