= 2020 League of Ireland First Division =

36th edition of the 2nd tier competition in association football in Ireland

League of Ireland First Division
- Season: 2020
- Dates: 21 February 2020 – 27 October 2020
- Champions: Drogheda United (5th title)
- Promoted: Drogheda United, Longford Town
- Matches: 90
- Goals: 265 (2.94 per match)
- Top goalscorer: Yousef Mahdy (15 league goals + 1 playoff goal)
- Biggest home win: UCD 8-0 Wexford (4 September 2020)
- Biggest away win: Cobh Ramblers 0-6 UCD (12 September 2020)
- Highest scoring: UCD 8-0 Wexford (4 September 2020) Longford Town 2-6 Galway United (3 October 2020)

The 2020 League of Ireland First Division season was the 36th season of the League of Ireland First Division. The league began on 21 February 2020 and concluded on 27 October 2020. Drogheda United won the league title for a record 5th time, winning promotion to the League of Ireland Premier Division for 2021. The Coronavirus pandemic in Ireland halted the season in mid-March as per directive of the Irish Government and the Football Association of Ireland. On 13 July 2020, the league announced the season restart with a reduced fixture list of two rounds only (18 games in total, per team for the regular season) and the play-off series as announced pre-season.

== Overview ==
The First Division has 10 teams. Each team plays each other three times for a total of 27 matches in the season. This format was changed after the league was postponed during the COVID-19 pandemic meaning each team would now play each other only two times, once home and once away. Additionally, the promotion play-off semi-finals, usually played over two legs, were played over one leg. UCD were relegated from the 2019 League of Ireland Premier Division. A reserve side of Shamrock Rovers F.C. competed in place of the Limerick team that encountered financial difficulty prior to the commencement of the season. Drogheda United finished top of the league table after a 2–0 away win over Cabinteely sealed the league title and promotion to the League Of Ireland Premier Division for 2021. It was the Drogs' record 5th First Division title. Wexford FC were wrongly applied forfeits in four games by the FAI, which was subsequently overturned and results restored.

== Teams ==
Locations of the First Division teams
Locations of Dublin First Division teams

=== Stadia and locations ===
| Team | Location | Stadium | Capacity |
|---|---|---|---|
| Athlone Town | Athlone | Athlone Town Stadium | 5,000 |
| Bray Wanderers | Bray | Carlisle Grounds | 4,000 |
| Cabinteely | Dublin (Cabinteely) | Stradbrook Road | 1,620 |
| Cobh Ramblers | Cobh | St. Colman's Park | 3,000 |
| Drogheda United | Drogheda | United Park | 2,000 |
| Galway United | Galway | Eamonn Deacy Park | 5,000 |
| Longford Town | Longford | Bishopsgate | 4,960 |
| Shamrock Rovers II | Dublin (Tallaght) | Tallaght Stadium | 8,000 |
| UCD | Dublin (Belfield) | UCD Bowl | 3,000 |
| Wexford | Crossabeg | Ferrycarrig Park | 2,500 |

=== Personnel and kits ===
Note: Flags indicate national team as has been defined under FIFA eligibility rules. Players may hold more than one non-FIFA nationality.

| Team | Manager | Captain | Kit manufacturer | Shirt sponsor |
|---|---|---|---|---|
| Athlone Town | (Republic of Ireland) Adrian Carbury | (Republic of Ireland) Darren Meenan | Nike | Nitro Sports |
| Bray Wanderers | (Republic of Ireland) Gary Cronin | (Republic of Ireland) Paul Keegan | Umbro | Matt Britton Carpets |
| Cabinteely | (Republic of Ireland) Pat Devlin | (Republic of Ireland) Conor Keeley | Uhlsport | Edufit |
| Cobh Ramblers | (Republic of Ireland) Stuart Ashton | (Republic of Ireland) Paul Hunt | Joma | Metropole Hotel |
| Drogheda United | (Republic of Ireland) Tim Clancy | (Republic of Ireland) Jake Hyland | Umbro | Scotch Hall Shopping Center |
| Galway United | (Republic of Ireland) John Caulfield | (Republic of Ireland) Shane Duggan | Puma | Comer Property Management |
| Longford Town | (Republic of Ireland) Daire Doyle | (Republic of Ireland) Dean Zambra | Macron | Bishopsgate |
| Shamrock Rovers II | (Republic of Ireland) Aidan Price | (Republic of Ireland) Darragh Nugent | Umbro | JD Sports |
| UCD | (Republic of Ireland) Andy Myler | (Republic of Ireland) Jack Keaney | O'Neill's | O'Neill's |
| Wexford | (Republic of Ireland) Brian O'Sullivan | (Republic of Ireland) Dan Tobin | Bodibro | Premier Tickets |

=== Managerial changes ===
| Team | Outgoing manager | Manner of departure | Date of vacancy | Position in table | Incoming manager | Date of appointment |
|---|---|---|---|---|---|---|
| Galway United | (Republic of Ireland) Alan Murphy | Sacked | 18 August 2020 | 9th | (Republic of Ireland) John Caulfield | 21 August 2020 |

== League table ==
| Pos | Team | Pld | W | D | L | GF | GA | GD | Pts | Qualification |
|---|---|---|---|---|---|---|---|---|---|---|
| 1 | Drogheda United (C, P) | 18 | 12 | 3 | 3 | 39 | 17 | +22 | 39 | Promotion to League of Ireland Premier Division |
| 2 | Bray Wanderers | 18 | 12 | 2 | 4 | 30 | 13 | +17 | 38 | Qualification to Promotion play-offs |
| 3 | UCD | 18 | 9 | 3 | 6 | 44 | 29 | +15 | 30 | Qualification to Promotion play-offs |
| 4 | Longford Town (P) | 18 | 9 | 2 | 7 | 26 | 23 | +3 | 29 | Qualification to Promotion play-offs |
| 5 | Galway United | 18 | 7 | 6 | 5 | 26 | 19 | +7 | 27 | Qualification to Promotion play-offs |
| 6 | Cobh Ramblers | 18 | 8 | 3 | 7 | 22 | 20 | +2 | 27 | |
| 7 | Cabinteely | 18 | 8 | 2 | 8 | 22 | 33 | −11 | 26 | |
| 8 | Shamrock Rovers II | 18 | 4 | 3 | 11 | 21 | 28 | −7 | 15 | |
| 9 | Athlone Town | 18 | 3 | 3 | 12 | 21 | 43 | −22 | 12 | |
| 10 | Wexford | 18 | 3 | 3 | 12 | 13 | 39 | −26 | 12 | |

Updated to match(es) played on 27 September 2021. Source: SSE Airtricity League, Soccerway
Rules for classification: 1) Points; 2) Goal difference; 3) Goals scored.
(C) Champions; (P) Promoted

== Results ==
=== Matches 1–18 ===
Teams play each other twice (once at home, once away). Wexford were wrongly applied a forfeit in four matches, which was subsequently overturned.

| Home \ Away | ATH | BRW | CAB | COB | DRO | GAL | LON | SHA | UCD | WEX |
|---|---|---|---|---|---|---|---|---|---|---|
| Athlone Town | — | 0–1 | 1–3 | 2–1 | 3–3 | 1–4 | 0–4 | 0–4 | 2–4 | 1–3 |
| Bray Wanderers | 3–1 | — | 3–0 | 0–0 | 0–1 | 0–1 | 3–0 | 1–0 | 2–0 | 2–0 |
| Cabinteely | 1–1 | 4–2 | — | 1–0 | 0–2 | 0–1 | 0–3 | 1–0 | 0–3 | 1–5 |
| Cobh Ramblers | 3–2 | 1–2 | 1–2 | — | 0–2 | 2–2 | 2–0 | 0–0 | 0–6 | 4–0 |
| Drogheda United | 0–2 | 3–1 | 5–1 | 0–1 | — | 1–0 | 0–1 | 3–2 | 5–1 | 2–0 |
| Galway United | 2–2 | 0–0 | 0–2 | 0–1 | 1–3 | — | 0–1 | 2–1 | 2–2 | 1–0 |
| Longford Town | 2–0 | 0–2 | 1–3 | 0–1 | 1–1 | 2–6 | — | 2–0 | 3–1 | 3–1 |
| Shamrock Rovers II | 3–1 | 0–2 | 0–2 | 0–1 | 2–2 | 1–1 | 1–2 | — | 2–5 | 2–0 |
| UCD | 2–1 | 1–3 | 5–1 | 1–0 | 1–3 | 0–3 | 0–0 | 3–1 | — | 8–0 |
| Wexford | 0–1 | 1–3 | 0–0 | 0–4 | 0–3 | 0–0 | 2–1 | 0–2 | 1–1 | — |

Updated to match(es) played on 27 October 2020 including revised results for Wexford following FAI ruling. Source: SSE Airtricity League
Legend: Blue = home team win; Yellow = draw; Red = away team win.

== Season statistics ==
=== Top scorers ===
Last updated: 27 October 2020.
Source: SSE Airtricity League First Division Statistics

| Rank | Player | Club | Goals |
|---|---|---|---|
| 1 | (Republic of Ireland) Yousef Mahdy | UCD | 15 |
| 2 | (Republic of Ireland) Colm Whelan | UCD | 14 |
| 3 | (Republic of Ireland) Mark Doyle | Drogheda United | 13 |
| 4 | (Republic of Ireland) Brandon Kavanagh | Shamrock Rovers II | 9 |
| 4 | (Republic of Ireland) Rob Manley | Longford Town | 9 |
| 5 | (Republic of Ireland) Ronan Manning | Athlone Town | 8 |
| 6 | (Republic of Ireland) Gary Shaw | Bray Wanderers | 7 |
| 7 | (Republic of Ireland) Darragh Lynch | Bray Wanderers | 6 |
| 7 | (Republic of Ireland) Sam Verdon | Longford Town | 6 |
| 8 | (Republic of Ireland) Shane Barnes | Cabinteely | 5 |

== Play-offs ==
=== First Division play-off Semi-finals ===
| 31 October 2020 | Bray Wanderers | 0–1 | Galway United | Carlisle Grounds |
| 15:00 | | | Wilson Waweru 86' |

| 31 October 2020 | UCD | 2–3 (a.e.t.) | Longford Town | UCD Bowl |
| 15:00 | Colm Whelan 18'; Yousef Mahdy 110' | | Joe Gorman 90'; Joe Gorman 113'; Dean Byrne 120' |

=== First Division play-off Final ===
| 6 November 2020 | Galway United | 1–2 | Longford Town | UCD Bowl |
| 19:45 | Killian Brouder 88' | Report | Karl Chambers 43'; Aodh Dervin 82' | Attendance: 0 (Behind closed doors); Referee: Mark Moynihan |

=== Promotion/relegation play-off ===
| 15 November 2020 | Shelbourne | 0–1 | Longford Town | Richmond Park |
| 14:30 | | Report | Rob Manley 46' | Attendance: 0 Referee: Neil Doyle |

== See also ==
- 2020 League of Ireland Premier Division
- 2020 FAI Cup
- 2020 League of Ireland Cup
