= 2022 Galway United F.C. season =

Irish football club season

Galway United
2022 season
- Manager: John Caulfield
- Stadium: Eamonn Deacy Park
- First Division: 3rd (play-offs)
- FAI Cup: Second round
- Top goalscorer: League: Stephen Walsh (16); All: Stephen Walsh (18)
Home colours	Away colours

The 2022 Galway United F.C. season was the football club's 44th season in the League of Ireland and their fifth consecutive season in the League of Ireland First Division since being relegated in 2017.

The club finished the season in 3rd, qualifying for the play-offs where they would defeat Longford Town in the semi-finals, before being defeated by Waterford in the final.

== Squad ==
#	Name	Nationality	Position	Date of birth (age)	Previous Club	Signed	Notes
Goalkeepers
1	Conor Kearns	(Republic of Ireland)	GK	May 6, 1998 (aged 24)	(Republic of Ireland) St Patrick's Athletic	2021	
16	Matthew Connor	(Republic of Ireland)	GK	April 8, 1997 (aged 25)	(Republic of Ireland) Waterford	2022	
23	Connal Doran	(Republic of Ireland)	GK	March 11, 2004 (aged 18)	(Republic of Ireland) Salthill Devon	2022	
Defenders
2	Conor O'Keeffe	(Republic of Ireland)	DF	September 19, 1993 (aged 29)	(Northern Ireland) Newry City	2021	
4	Charlie Lyons	(Republic of Ireland)	DF	March 26, 2000 (aged 22)	(Republic of Ireland) Cobh Ramblers	2022	
5	Killian Brouder	(Republic of Ireland)	DF	August 20, 1998 (aged 24)	(Republic of Ireland) Limerick	2019	
6	Diego Portilla	(Spain)	DF	April 28, 1994 (aged 28)	(Spain) Atlético Paso	2022	
12	James Finnerty	(Republic of Ireland)	DF	February 1, 1999 (aged 23)	(Republic of Ireland) Bohemians	2022	Loan
20	Evan O'Connor	(Republic of Ireland)	DF	September 20, 2000 (aged 22)	(Republic of Ireland) Regional United	2022	
21	Oisín O'Reilly	(Republic of Ireland)	DF	November 27, 2000 (aged 21)	(Republic of Ireland) Athlone Town	2022	
29	Adam Thomas	(New Zealand)	DF	April 1, 1992 (aged 30)	(Republic of Ireland) Shelbourne	2022	Loan
Midfielders
7	Steven Healy	(Republic of Ireland)	MF	July 3, 2004 (aged 18)	(Republic of Ireland) Academy	2022	
10	David Hurley	(Republic of Ireland)	MF	October 21, 1998 (aged 24)	(Republic of Ireland) Cobh Ramblers	2021	
14	Ronan Manning	(Republic of Ireland)	MF	May 15, 2000 (aged 22)	(Republic of Ireland) Athlone Town	2021	
17	Bastien Héry	(Madagascar)	MF	March 23, 1992 (aged 30)	(Republic of Ireland) Finn Harps	2022	Loan
22	Conor McCormack	(Republic of Ireland)	MF	May 18, 1990 (aged 32)	(Republic of Ireland) Derry City	2021	Captain
24	Ed McCarthy	(Republic of Ireland)	MF	April 20, 2001 (aged 21)	(Republic of Ireland) Regional United	2022	
26	Mikey McCullagh	(Republic of Ireland)	MF	November 7, 2004 (aged 17)	(Republic of Ireland) Academy	2022	
27	Max Hemmings	(England)	MF	February 27, 1997 (aged 25)	(United States) Greenville Triumph	2022	
31	Adam O'Halloran	(Republic of Ireland)	MF	October 12, 2006 (aged 16)	(Republic of Ireland) Mervue United	2022	
Forwards
3	Stephen Walsh	(Republic of Ireland)	FW	August 29, 1990 (aged 32)	(Republic of Ireland) Galway Hibernians	2018	
8	Mikie Rowe	(Republic of Ireland)	FW	July 3, 1996 (aged 26)	(United States) Tormenta	2021	
9	Manu Dimas	(Spain)	FW	April 18, 1992 (aged 30)	(Spain) Unión Viera	2022	
11	Aaron Neary	(Republic of Ireland)	FW	May 12, 2003 (aged 19)	(Republic of Ireland) Mervue United	2022	
15	David Tarmey	(Republic of Ireland)	FW	September 2, 2004 (aged 18)	(Republic of Ireland) Academy	2022	
18	Wilson Waweru	(Republic of Ireland)	FW	December 27, 2000 (aged 21)	(Republic of Ireland) Academy	2018	
19	Francely Lomboto	(Republic of Ireland)	FW	July 2, 2000 (aged 22)	(Republic of Ireland) Galway Hibernians	2020	
28	Rob Manley	(Republic of Ireland)	FW	August 24, 1997 (aged 25)	(Republic of Ireland) Bray Wanderers	2022	
Players who departed before the end of the season
7	Gary Boylan	(Republic of Ireland)	DF	April 24, 1996 (aged 26)	(Republic of Ireland) Cork City	2021	Loaned out
11	Shane Doherty	(United States)	MF	August 16, 1996 (aged 26)	(United States) Rowan	2019	
12	Jordan Adeyemo	(Republic of Ireland)	FW	July 2, 2000 (aged 22)	(Republic of Ireland) Drogheda United	2022	
15	Dean O'Shea	(Republic of Ireland)	MF	September 20, 2002 (aged 19)	(Republic of Ireland) Bray Wanderers	2021	
23	Conor Brann	(Republic of Ireland)	GK	June 27, 2003 (aged 19)	(Republic of Ireland) Limerick	2022	
25	Alex Murphy	(Republic of Ireland)	DF	June 25, 2004 (aged 18)	(Republic of Ireland) Corrib Celtic	2021	
31	Mark Russell	(Scotland)	DF	March 22, 1996 (aged 26)	(Scotland) Greenock Morton	2022	

=== Transfers ===
==== In ====
Date	Position	Nationality	Name	Last club	Ref.
25 December 2021	FW	(Republic of Ireland)	Jordan Adeyemo	(Republic of Ireland) Drogheda United	
9 January 2022	DF	(Spain)	Diego Portilla	(Spain) Atlético Paso	
10 January 2022	FW	(Spain)	Manu Dimas	(Spain) Unión Viera	
1 February 2022	MF	(Republic of Ireland)	Ed McCarthy	(Republic of Ireland) Regional United	
1 February 2022	DF	(Republic of Ireland)	Evan O'Connor	(Republic of Ireland) Regional United	
2 February 2022	DF	(Republic of Ireland)	Charlie Lyons	(Republic of Ireland) Cobh Ramblers	
6 February 2022	DF	(Republic of Ireland)	Oisín O'Reilly	(Republic of Ireland) Athlone Town	
20 February 2022	MF	(England)	Max Hemmings	(United States) Greenville Triumph	
2 March 2022	GK	(Republic of Ireland)	Matthew Connor	(Republic of Ireland) Waterford	
2 July 2022	DF	(Scotland)	Mark Russell	(Scotland) Greenock Morton	
6 July 2022	FW	(Republic of Ireland)	Rob Manley	(Republic of Ireland) Bray Wanderers	

==== Out ====
Date	Position	Nationality	Name	To	Ref.
8 November 2021 (Note: Horgan departed the club at the end of the 2021 season, he joined Treaty United on 26 July 2024)	DF	(Republic of Ireland)	Christopher Horgan	(Republic of Ireland) Treaty United	
9 December 2021	FW	(Republic of Ireland)	Ruairí Keating	(Republic of Ireland) Cork City	
11 January 2022	FW	(Republic of Ireland)	Mikey Place	(Northern Ireland) Ballymena United	
31 January 2022	DF	(Republic of Ireland)	Joe Gorman	(Republic of Ireland) Treaty United	
1 July 2022 (Note: Murphy was signed on a pre-contract agreement on 28 May, he moved once the transfer window had opened and he had turned 18.)	DF	(Republic of Ireland)	Alex Murphy	(England) Newcastle United	
8 July 2022	FW	(Republic of Ireland)	Jordan Adeyemo	(Republic of Ireland) Longford Town	
4 August 2022	DF	(Scotland)	Mark Russell	(Northern Ireland) Portadown	
1 September 2022	GK	(Republic of Ireland)	Conor Brann	(England) Swindon Town	

==== Loan in ====
Date	Position	Nationality	Name	From	Date until	Ref.
3 July 2022	DF	(Republic of Ireland)	James Finnerty	(Republic of Ireland) Bohemians	4 November 2022	
28 July 2022	DF	(New Zealand)	Adam Thomas	(Republic of Ireland) Shelbourne	4 November 2022	
29 July 2022	MF	(Madagascar)	Bastien Héry	(Republic of Ireland) Finn Harps	4 November 2022	

==== Loan out ====
Date	Position	Nationality	Name	To	Date until	Ref.
29 July 2022	DF	(Republic of Ireland)	Gary Boylan	(Republic of Ireland) Finn Harps	4 November 2022	

== Club ==
=== Coaching staff ===
- Manager: John Caulfield
- Assistant Manager: Colin Fortune
- Goalkeeping Coach: Gianluca Aimi
- Strength and Conditioning Coach: Danny Broderick
- Physiotherapist: Richard Grier
- Analyst: Robert Crosbie

== Competitions ==
=== League of Ireland First Division ===
As a result of the merger between Bray Wanderers and Cabinteely, there were only 9 teams who would play 32 games each instead of the usual 10 teams playing 36 games each that the division would return to the season after following the addition of Kerry.

==== League Table ====
Pos	Team	Pld	W	D	L	GF	GA	GD	Pts	Qualification
1	Cork City (C, P)	32	20	8	4	63	22	+41	68	Promotion to League of Ireland Premier Division
2	Waterford	32	20	4	8	70	34	+36	64	Qualification for Promotion play-offs
3	Galway United	32	17	9	6	56	29	+27	60	Qualification for Promotion play-offs
4	Longford Town	32	14	10	8	49	41	+8	52	Qualification for Promotion play-offs
5	Treaty United	32	11	11	10	37	43	−6	44	Qualification for Promotion play-offs

Source: League of Ireland, Soccerway
Rules for classification: 1) Points; 2) Goal difference; 3) Goals scored
(C) Champions; (P) Promoted

==== Results summary ====
Overall								Home						Away					
Pld	W	D	L	GF	GA	GD	Pts	W	D	L	GF	GA	GD	W	D	L	GF	GA	GD
32	17	9	6	56	29	+27	60	8	5	3	26	15	+11	9	4	3	30	14	+16

==== Matches ====
Win Draw Loss

25 February 2022 1	Cork City	0–1	Galway United	Turners Cross, Cork
19:45 GMT		Report	McCarthy 38'; Waweru (yellow card) 45' (yellow-red card) 50'	Stadium: Turners Cross; Attendance: 4,984; Referee: Eoghan O'Shea

4 March 2022 2	Galway United	2–2	Waterford	Terryland, County Galway
19:45 GMT	Adeyemo 48'; Walsh 75'	Report	Quitirna 15'; Nolan 37'; Taylor (red card) 85'	Stadium: Eamonn Deacy Park; Attendance: 3,025; Referee: Alan Patchell

11 March 2022 3	Bray Wanderers	1–3	Galway United	Bray, County Wicklow
19:45 GMT	Douglas 69'	Report	Hurley 53' (pen.); Walsh 67'; Doherty 90+2'	Stadium: Carlisle Grounds; Attendance: 496; Referee: Mark Moynihan

14 March 2022 4	Galway United	2–1	Treaty United	Terryland, County Galway
19:45 GMT	Waweru 6'; Walsh 44'	Report	Curran 69'	Stadium: Eamonn Deacy Park; Attendance: 1,355; Referee: Michael Connolly

18 March 2022 5	Athlone Town	1–2	Galway United	Lissywollen, Athlone
19:45 GMT	Edogun 85'	Report	Dimas 58'; Waweru 71'	Stadium: Athlone Town Stadium; Attendance: 532; Referee: David Keeler

25 March 2022 6	Longford Town	2–1	Galway United	Longford, County Longford
19:45 GMT	McDonnell 8' (o.g.); Verdon 45'; Craven 77'	Report		Stadium: Bishopsgate; Attendance: 726; Referee: Oliver Moran

1 April 2022 7	Galway United	1–0	Cobh Ramblers	Terryland, County Galway
19:45 GMT	Brouder 68'	Report		Stadium: Eamonn Deacy Park; Attendance: 1,759; Referee: Alan Patchell

9 April 2022 8	Galway United	1–1	Wexford	Terryland, County Galway
17:00 GMT	Walsh 88'	Report	Dobbs 18'	Stadium: Eamonn Deacy Park; Attendance: 1,519; Referee: Michael Connolly

15 April 2022 9	Waterford	0–1	Galway United	Waterford, County Waterford
19:45 GMT		Report	Dimas 13'	Stadium: RSC; Attendance: 1,466; Referee: Alan Patchell

22 April 2022 10	Galway United	2–0	Bray Wanderers	Terryland, County Galway
19:45 GMT	Walsh 8'; Hurley 70'	Report		Stadium: Eamonn Deacy Park; Attendance: 1,307; Referee: Paul Norton

29 April 2022 11	Treaty United	2–3	Galway United	Garryowen, Limerick
19:45 GMT	George 13', 62'	Report	Manning 75'; Murphy 80'; Walsh 88'	Stadium: Markets Field; Attendance: 743; Referee: Kevin O'Sullivan

2 May 2022 12	Galway United	2–0	Longford Town	Terryland, County Galway
17:00 GMT	Hurley 51' (pen.); Hemmings 72'	Report	McMenamy (yellow card) 77' (yellow-red card) 82'	Stadium: Eamonn Deacy Park; Attendance: 2,806; Referee: David Dunne

6 May 2022 13	Cobh Ramblers	0–4	Galway United	Cobh, County Cork
19:45 GMT		Report	Hemmings 20'; McCarthy 36', 45+2'; Dimas 90'	Stadium: St Colman's Park; Attendance: 652; Referee: Oliver Moran

13 May 2022 14	Wexford	0–4	Galway United	Crossabeg, County Wexford
19:45 GMT		Report	Brouder 9'; Walsh 15', 28'; Hurley 71' (pen.)	Stadium: Ferrycarrig Park; Attendance: 342; Referee: Eoghan O'Shea

20 May 2022 15	Galway United	3–0	Athlone Town	Terryland, County Galway
19:45 GMT	Murphy 54'; Hurley 81'; Manning 90'	Report		Stadium: Eamonn Deacy Park; Attendance: 1,248; Referee: Gavin Colfer

27 May 2022 16	Galway United	0–1	Cork City	Terryland, County Galway
19:45 GMT		Report	Healy 18'; Keating (red card) 67'	Stadium: Eamonn Deacy Park; Attendance: 4,115; Referee: Oliver Moran

17 June 2022 17	Bray Wanderers	1–5	Galway United	Bray, County Wicklow
19:45 GMT	Lynch 65'	Report	Walsh 1', 79'; Waweru 23'; Hemmings 73'; Hurley 82' (pen.)	Stadium: Carlisle Grounds; Attendance: 400; Referee: Kevin O'Sullivan

24 June 2022 18	Galway United	0–0	Treaty United	Terryland, County Galway
19:45 GMT		Report		Stadium: Eamonn Deacy Park; Attendance: 1,741; Referee: Eoghan O'Shea

27 June 2022 19	Longford Town	2–0	Galway United	Longford, County Longford
19:45 GMT	Măgerușan 64', 82'	Report		Stadium: Bishopsgate; Attendance: 484; Referee: Oliver Moran

1 July 2022 20	Galway United	1–0	Waterford	Terryland, County Galway
19:45 GMT	Brouder 57'	Report		Stadium: Eamonn Deacy Park; Attendance: 1,267; Referee: Paul Norton

8 July 2022 21	Galway United	3–0	Cobh Ramblers	Terryland, County Galway
19:45 GMT	Walsh 30', 82'; Manley 67'	Report		Stadium: Eamonn Deacy Park; Attendance: 1,434; Referee: Eoghan O'Shea

15 July 2022 22	Cork City	0–0	Galway United	Turners Cross, Cork
19:45 GMT		Report	McCarthy (red card) 16'	Stadium: Turners Cross; Attendance: 6,393; Referee: Sean Grant

22 July 2022 23	Athlone Town	1–3	Galway United	Lissywollen, Athlone
19:45 GMT	Spain 87'; Connolly (red card) 90+1'	Report	Manley 18'; Lomboto 89'; Dimas 90'	Stadium: Athlone Town Stadium; Attendance: 435; Referee: Alan Patchell

5 August 2022 24	Galway United	2–2	Wexford	Terryland, County Galway
19:45 GMT	Manley 13'; Walsh 61'	Report	Barry 18', 22'	Stadium: Eamonn Deacy Park; Attendance: 1,903; Referee: Mark Moynihan

12 August 2022 25	Waterford	2–1	Galway United	Waterford, County Waterford
19:45 GMT	Idowu 18'; Patterson (penalty missed) 67'; Quitirna 83' (pen.)	Report	Walsh 11'; McCormack (red card) 65'	Stadium: RSC; Attendance: 1,668; Referee: Alan Patchell

19 August 2022 26	Galway United	1–2	Bray Wanderers	Terryland, County Galway
19:45 GMT	Hurley (penalty missed) 5'; Manning 90+3' (pen.)	Report	Feeney 8'; Kelly 28'; Donohue (yellow card) 85' (yellow-red card) 89'	Stadium: Eamonn Deacy Park; Attendance: 1,380; Referee: Kevin O'Sullivan

9 September 2022 27	Cobh Ramblers	1–1	Galway United	Cobh, County Cork
19:45 GMT	O'Sullivan-Connell 31'	Report	Rowe 90+6'	Stadium: St Colman's Park; Attendance: 946; Referee: Mark Patchell

16 September 2022 28	Galway United	2–1	Cork City	Terryland, County Galway
19:45 GMT	Waweru 70'; Lyons 72'	Report	Coffey 50'	Stadium: Eamonn Deacy Park; Attendance: 3,132; Referee: Oliver Moran

30 September 2022 29	Treaty United	1–1	Galway United	Garryowen, Limerick
19:45 GMT	Curran 10'	Report	Walsh 80' (pen.)	Stadium: Markets Field; Attendance: 903; Referee: Mark Moynihan

7 October 2022 30	Galway United	1–2	Athlone Town	Terryland, County Galway
19:45 GMT	Walsh 2'	Report	Lennon 18'; Oluwa 80'	Stadium: Eamonn Deacy Park; Attendance: 2,815; Referee: Declan Toland

14 October 2022 31	Wexford	0–0	Galway United	Crossabeg, County Wexford
19:45 GMT		Report		Stadium: Ferrycarrig Park; Attendance: 417; Referee: Alan Patchell

21 October 2022 32	Galway United	3–3	Longford Town	Terryland, County Galway
19:45 GMT	O'Connor 27'; Manley 46', 82'	Report	Clarke 8'; O'Brien 36'; Măgerușan 45+3'	Stadium: Eamonn Deacy Park; Attendance: 1,034; Referee: Paul Norton

==== Play-offs ====
===== Semi-finals =====
26 October 2022 First leg	Longford Town	2–2	Galway United	Longford, County Longford
19:45 GMT	Adeyemo 28', 54'	Report	Rowe 49', 61'	Stadium: Bishopsgate; Attendance: 942; Referee: Kevin O'Sullivan

30 October 2022 Second leg	Galway United	3–0 (5–2 agg.)	Longford Town	Terryland, County Galway
19:45 GMT	Hurley 28'; Rowe 90'; Manley 90+3'	Report		Stadium: Eamonn Deacy Park; Attendance: 3,031; Referee: Paul Norton

===== Final =====
4 November 2022 Final	Galway United	0–3	Waterford	Terryland, County Galway
19:45 GMT	Walsh (penalty missed) 79'	Report	Quitirna 10', 81'; Aouachria 45+1'	Stadium: Eamonn Deacy Park; Attendance: 2,308; Referee: Alan Patchell

=== FAI Cup ===
Win Draw Loss

==== First Round ====
31 July 2022 First Round	Bluebell United	0–7	Galway United	Drumcondra, Dublin 3
15:00 GMT	Stritch (red card) 11'	Report	Hurley 9' (pen.); Walsh 32', 33'; Manley 51'; Tarmey 80'; Lomboto 88', 90'	Stadium: Tolka Park; Attendance: 300; Referee: Gavin Colfer

==== Second Round ====
26 August 2022 Second Round	Galway United	2–3	UCD	Terryland, County Galway
19:45 GMT	Rowe 44'; Hemmings 65'	Report	Lonergan 17', 87'; Duffy 51'	Stadium: Eamonn Deacy Park; Referee: Damien MacGraith

== Statistics ==
=== Appearances and goals ===
This table shows all of the players who have featured in a first team squad for Galway United this season
Brackets denotes how many of the listed appearances were made as a substitute

No.	Pos.	Player	League		FAI Cup		Play-offs		Total	
No.	Pos.	Player	Apps	Goals	Apps	Goals	Apps	Goals	Apps	Goals
1	GK	(Republic of Ireland) Conor Kearns	32	0	0	0	3	0	35	0
2	DF	(Republic of Ireland) Conor O'Keeffe	27(4)	0	1	0	3	0	31	0
3	DF	(Republic of Ireland) Stephen Walsh	29(5)	16	2	2	3	0	34	18
4	DF	(Republic of Ireland) Charlie Lyons	25(13)	1	2(1)	0	2(2)	0	29	1
5	DF	(Republic of Ireland) Killian Brouder	23	3	0	0	3	0	26	3
6	DF	(Spain) Diego Portilla	25(3)	0	2(2)	0	0	0	27	0
7	DF	(Republic of Ireland) Gary Boylan	19(13)	0	0	0	0	0	19	0
7	MF	(Republic of Ireland) Steven Healy	1(1)	0	0	0	0	0	1	0
8	MF	(Republic of Ireland) Mikie Rowe	18(5)	1	2(1)	1	3(3)	3	23	5
9	FW	(Spain) Manu Dimas	25(11)	4	0	0	0	0	25	1
10	MF	(Republic of Ireland) David Hurley	32(2)	6	2	1	3	1	37	8
11	MF	(United States) Shane Doherty	4(4)	0	0	0	0	0	4	0
11	FW	(Republic of Ireland) Aaron Neary	1(1)	0	0	0	0	0	1	0
12	FW	(Republic of Ireland) Jordan Adeyemo	16(13)	1	0	0	0	0	16	1
12	DF	(Republic of Ireland) James Finnerty	11	0	2	0	3	0	16	0
14	MF	(Republic of Ireland) Ronan Manning	19(5)	2	2	1	0	0	21	3
15	MF	(Republic of Ireland) Dean O'Shea	1(1)	0	0	0	0	0	1	0
15	FW	(Republic of Ireland) David Tarmey	6(5)	0	1(1)	1	0	0	7	1
16	GK	(Republic of Ireland) Matthew Connor	0	0	2	0	0	0	2	0
17	MF	(Madagascar) Bastien Héry	8(4)	0	2(1)	0	2(1)	0	12	0
18	FW	(Republic of Ireland) Wilson Waweru	28(7)	4	1	0	1(1)	0	30	4
19	FW	(Republic of Ireland) Francely Lomboto	20(16)	1	2(2)	2	1(1)	0	23	3
20	DF	(Republic of Ireland) Evan O'Connor	1	1	1(1)	0	0	0	2	1
21	DF	(Republic of Ireland) Oisín O'Reilly	7(5)	0	1	0	0	0	8	0
22	MF	(Republic of Ireland) Conor McCormack	27	0	2	0	3	0	32	0
23	GK	(Republic of Ireland) Conor Brann	0	0	0	0	0	0	0	0
23	GK	(Republic of Ireland) Connal Doran	0	0	0	0	0	0	0	0
24	MF	(Republic of Ireland) Ed McCarthy	29(2)	3	1	0	3	0	33	9
25	DF	(Republic of Ireland) Alex Murphy	20	2	0	0	0	0	20	2
26	MF	(Republic of Ireland) Mikey McCullagh	1(1)	0	0	0	0	0	1	0
27	DF	(England) Max Hemmings	23(5)	3	2	1	3	0	27	4
28	FW	(Republic of Ireland) Rob Manley	10(3)	5	2(1)	1	3(3)	1	15	7
29	DF	(New Zealand) Adam Thomas	6(4)	0	1(1)	0	3	0	10	0
30	DF	(Republic of Ireland) Ben Molloy	0	0	0	0	0	0	0	0
31	DF	(Scotland) Mark Russell	1(1)	0	0	0	0	0	1	0
31	MF	(Republic of Ireland) Adam O'Halloran	1(1)	0	0	0	0	0	1	0

=== Clean sheets ===
No.	Player	League	FAI Cup	Play-offs	Total		
No.	Player	1	(Republic of Ireland) Conor Kearns	13	0	1	14
16	(Republic of Ireland) Matthew Connor	0	1	0	1		

=== Disciplinary record ===
No.	Player	League			FAI Cup			Play-offs			Total		
No.	Player	Yellow card	(yellow card) (yellow-red card)	Red card	Yellow card	(yellow card) (yellow-red card)	Red card	Yellow card	(yellow card) (yellow-red card)	Red card	Yellow card	(yellow card) (yellow-red card)	Red card
3	Stephen Walsh	8	0	0	0	0	0	1	0	0	9	0	0
22	Conor McCormack	6	0	0	1	0	0	0	0	0	7	0	0
10	David Hurley	5	0	0	1	0	0	0	0	0	6	0	0
24	Ed McCarthy	3	0	1	0	0	0	1	0	0	4	0	1
2	Conor O'Keeffe	3	0	0	0	0	0	1	0	0	4	0	0
6	Diego Portilla	4	0	0	0	0	0	0	0	0	4	0	0
4	Charlie Lyons	3	0	0	0	0	0	0	0	0	3	0	0
8	Mikie Rowe	3	0	0	0	0	0	0	0	0	3	0	0
14	Ronan Manning	3	0	0	0	0	0	0	0	0	3	0	0
27	Max Hemmings	3	0	0	0	0	0	0	0	0	3	0	0
18	Wilson Waweru	2	1	0	0	0	0	0	0	0	2	1	0
5	Killian Brouder	2	0	0	0	0	0	0	0	0	2	0	0
29	Adam Thomas	1	0	0	0	0	0	1	0	0	2	0	0
1	Conor Kearns	1	0	0	0	0	0	0	0	0	1	0	0
12	James Finnerty	0	0	0	0	0	0	1	0	0	1	0	0
17	Bastien Héry	1	0	0	0	0	0	0	0	0	1	0	0
21	Oisín O'Reilly	1	0	0	0	0	0	0	0	0	1	0	0
Totals		49	1	1	2	0	0	5	0	0	56	1	1

== International call-ups ==
=== Madagascar National Team ===
Player	Fixture	Date	Location	Event
Bastien Héry	vs. (Republic of the Congo) Congo	24 September 2022	Brazzaville, Congo	Friendly
Bastien Héry	vs. Benin	27 September 2022	Mohammedia, Morocco	Friendly
