= 2015 League of Ireland First Division =

Season of football in Ireland

League of Ireland First Division
- Season: 2015
- Champions: Wexford Youths
- Promoted: Finn Harps
- Matches: 112
- Goals: 303 (2.71 per match)
- Top goalscorer: Daniel Furlong: 30 (Wexford Youths)

The 2015 League of Ireland First Division season was the 31st season of the League of Ireland First Division. The First Division was contested by eight teams. Wexford Youths won the title and Finn Harps were also promoted after winning a play off.

== Teams ==
Locations of the First Division teams

=== Stadia and locations ===
Team	Location	Stadium
Athlone Town	Athlone	Athlone Town Stadium
Cabinteely	Cabinteely	Stradbrook Road
Cobh Ramblers	Cobh	St. Colman's Park
Finn Harps	Ballybofey	Finn Park
Shelbourne	Drumcondra	Tolka Park
UCD	Belfield	UCD Bowl
Waterford United	Waterford	Waterford RSC
Wexford Youths	Crossabeg	Ferrycarrig Park

=== Personnel and kits ===
Note: Flags indicate national team as has been defined under FIFA eligibility rules. Players may hold more than one non-FIFA nationality.

Team	Manager	Captain	Kit manufacturer	Shirt sponsor
Athlone Town	~~(Republic of Ireland) Eddie Wallace~~ (Republic of Ireland) Alan Mathews	(Republic of Ireland) Brian Shortall	Nike	Nitro Sports
Cabinteely	(Republic of Ireland) Eddie Gormley		Umbro	
Cobh Ramblers	~~(Republic of Ireland) Martin Cambridge~~ (Republic of Ireland) Stephen Henderson		Nike	Eirgrid
Finn Harps	(Republic of Ireland) Ollie Horgan	(Republic of Ireland) Kevin McHugh	Legea	McGettigan Group
Shelbourne	(Republic of Ireland) Kevin Doherty (footballer)		Macron	
UCD	(Republic of Ireland) Collie O'Neill	(Republic of Ireland) Robbie Benson	O'Neills	O'Neills
Waterford United	~~(Republic of Ireland) Tommy Griffin~~ (Republic of Ireland) Roddy Collins	(Republic of Ireland) Vinny Sullivan	Macron	SportsWorld
Wexford Youths	(Republic of Ireland) Shane Keegan	(Republic of Ireland) Graham Doyle	O'Neills	Galenisys

== Overview ==
Locations of Dublin First Division teams

The 2015 First Division featured eight teams. Each team played each other four times, twice at home and twice away, for a total of 28 matches during the season. Wexford Youths secured their first League of Ireland First Division title and promotion to the Premier Division with a 3–0 victory against Athlone Town at Ferrycarrig Park. The Youths goals came from Danny Furlong, Eric Molloy and Aidan Keenan.

== Final table ==
Pos	Team	Pld	W	D	L	GF	GA	GD	Pts	Qualification
1	Wexford Youths (C, P)	28	20	1	7	63	32	+31	61	Promotion to League of Ireland Premier Division
2	Finn Harps (O, P)	28	16	7	5	42	23	+19	55	Qualification for Promotion play-offs
3	UCD	28	14	7	7	51	26	+25	49	Qualification for Promotion play-offs
4	Shelbourne	28	13	6	9	37	34	+3	45	
5	Athlone Town	28	9	6	13	36	42	−6	33	
6	Cobh Ramblers	28	8	6	14	27	45	−18	30	
7	Waterford United	28	5	6	17	25	51	−26	21	
8	Cabinteely	28	5	5	18	22	50	−28	20	

(C) Champions; (O) Play-off winners; (P) Promoted

== Results ==
=== Matches 1–14 ===
Home \ Away	ATH	CAB	COB	FHA	SHE	UCD	WAT	WEX
Athlone Town		2–2	4–0	1–0	2–3	1–1	1–0	0–1
Cabinteely	2–0		2–2	1–1	0–1	0–2	1–0	1–0
Cobh Ramblers	1–0	1–0		2–3	1–0	0–3	1–0	1–4
Finn Harps	1–0	2–0	2–0		1–0	2–2	3–2	1–3
Shelbourne	1–3	1–0	1–1	0–0		0–2	1–0	2–4
UCD	1–2	6–1	1–1	2–2	0–1		3–0	4–1
Waterford United	1–1	3–1	1–1	0–2	2–2	0–0		1–4
Wexford Youths	2–0	7–0	1–0	0–1	2–3	1–0	1–2	

Legend: Blue = home team win; Yellow = draw; Red = away team win.

=== Matches 15–28 ===
Home \ Away	ATH	CAB	COB	FHA	SHE	UCD	WAT	WEX
Athlone Town		0–1	1–4	1–1	2–1	2–2	3–4	3–1
Cabinteely	1–3		1–0	2–3	0–1	0–3 (Note: Cabinteely fielded an ineligible player, Dean Ebbe, in their game against UCD on 31 July 2015. They lost 3–1. The FAI subsequently awarded the match to UCD as a 3–0 win and fined Cabinteely €2,500.)	1–1	2–3
Cobh Ramblers	2–1	2–1		0–1	2–2	1–1	0–2	0–3
Finn Harps	0–0	1–0	2–0		1–0	3–0	0–0	4–1
Shelbourne	3–1	0–0	2–0	3–2		2–1	3–0	0–0
UCD	3–1	1–0	3–0	1–0	2–1		5–1	1–2
Waterford United	0–1	1–0	1–3	0–3	1–2	0–1		2–3
Wexford Youths	3–0	3–2	2–1	2–0	4–1	1–0	4–0	

Legend: Blue = home team win; Yellow = draw; Red = away team win.

== Top scorers ==
Rank	Player	Club	Goals
1	(Republic of Ireland) Daniel Furlong	Wexford Youths	30
2	(Republic of Ireland) Ryan Swan	UCD	12
3	(Republic of Ireland) Philip Gorman	Athlone Town	10
4	(Northern Ireland) Kevin McHugh	Finn Harps	9

== Promotion/relegation playoffs ==
The second and third placed First Division teams, Finn Harps and UCD, played off to decide who would play Limerick, the eleventh placed team from the Premier Division. The winner of this play off would play in the 2016 Premier Division.

First Division

23 October 2015	UCD	0–1	Finn Harps	UCD Bowl
19:45			Coll 1'

30 October 2015	Finn Harps	2–1	UCD	Finn Park
19:45	Boyle 76'; Mailey 89'		O'Connor 59'

Finn Harps won 3 – 1 on aggregate

First Division v Premier Division

2 November 2015	Limerick	1–0	Finn Harps	Markets Field
	Kelly 34'	Report		Referee: Rob Rogers

6 November 2015	Finn Harps	2–0 (a.e.t.)	Limerick	Finn Park
	Funston 38'; Banda 117'			Attendance: 3,200; Referee: Derek Tomney

Finn Harps won 2–1 on aggregate and were promoted to 2016 Premier Division. Limerick are relegated to the 2016 First Division.

== See also ==
- 2015 League of Ireland Premier Division
- 2015 League of Ireland Cup
