= Mallins =

Irish surname, variation on Mallin

Mallins is a spelling variation of Irish surname Mallin. The original Gaelic form of the name is O'Meallain, derived from the word meall meaning "attractive" or "pleasant".

The surname was first found in County Tyrone; the ancient territory of the O'Neills in Northern Ireland, where the Mallins held a family seat with a large political and economical influence in the area.
