= 2019 League of Ireland First Division =

League of Ireland First Division
- Season: 2019
- Dates: February 2019 – October 2019
- Champions: Shelbourne (1st title)
- Promoted: Shelbourne
- Matches: 135
- Goals: 392 (2.9 per match)
- Top goalscorer: Rob Manley (17 goals)
- Biggest home win: Shelbourne 7-0 Limerick (21 September 2019)
- Biggest away win: Athlone Town 0-5 Bray Wanderers (17 May 2019), Cabinteely 0-5 Drogheda United (19 May 2019)
- Total attendance: 75,795
- Average attendance: 561

The 2019 League of Ireland First Division season was the 35th season of the League of Ireland First Division. The league began in February 2019 and concluded in October 2019. Shelbourne emerged as champions after beating title rivals Drogheda United 3–1 away from home on 13 September 2019, earning them promotion to the top flight for the first time since 2012.

== Overview ==
The First Division has 10 teams. Each team plays each other three times for a total of 27 matches in the season.

== Teams ==
Locations of the First Division teams
Locations of Dublin First Division teams

=== Stadia and locations ===
Team	Location	Stadium	Capacity
Athlone Town	Athlone	Athlone Town Stadium	5,000
Bray Wanderers	Bray	Carlisle Grounds	4,000
Cabinteely	Cabinteely	Stradbrook Road	1,620
Cobh Ramblers	Cobh	St. Colman's Park	3,000
Drogheda United	Drogheda	United Park	2,000
Galway United	Galway	Eamonn Deacy Park	5,000
Limerick	Limerick	Markets Field	5,000
Longford Town	Longford	City Calling Stadium	4,960
Shelbourne	Drumcondra	Tolka Park	3,500
Wexford	Crossabeg	Ferrycarrig Park	2,500

=== Personnel and kits ===
Note: Flags indicate national team as has been defined under FIFA eligibility rules. Players may hold more than one non-FIFA nationality.

Team	Manager	Captain	Kit manufacturer	Shirt sponsor
Athlone Town	(Republic of Ireland) Terry Butler	Committee	Nike	Nitro Sports
Bray Wanderers	(Republic of Ireland) Gary Cronin	(Republic of Ireland) Paul Keegan	Umbro	Matt Britton Carpets
Cabinteely	(Republic of Ireland) Pat Devlin	(Republic of Ireland) Stephen McGuinness	Uhlsport	Dublin School of Grinds
Cobh Ramblers	(Republic of Ireland) Stephen Henderson	(Republic of Ireland) Paul Hunt	Joma	Tony & William O'Shea Fuels Rushbrooke
Drogheda United	(Republic of Ireland) Tim Clancy	(Republic of Ireland) Jake Hyland	CX+ Sport	Scotch Hall Shopping Center
Galway United	(Republic of Ireland) Alan Murphy	(Republic of Ireland) Stephen Walsh	Puma	Comer Property Management
Limerick	(Republic of Ireland) Tommy Barrett	(Republic of Ireland) Shaun Kelly	Umbro	Daly Car Sales
Longford Town	(England) Neale Fenn	(Republic of Ireland) Dean Zambra	Macron	City Calling
Shelbourne	(Republic of Ireland) Ian Morris	(Republic of Ireland) Dean Delaney	Umbro	abbeyseals.ie
Wexford	(Republic of Ireland) Brian O'Sullivan	(Republic of Ireland) Craig McCabe	Bodibro	Premier Tickets

== League table ==
Pos	Team	Pld	W	D	L	GF	GA	GD	Pts	Qualification
1	Shelbourne (C, P)	27	19	3	5	50	19	+31	60	Promotion to League of Ireland Premier Division
2	Drogheda United (Q)	27	16	3	8	59	36	+23	51	Qualification for Promotion play-offs
3	Longford Town (Q)	27	16	3	8	41	23	+18	51	Qualification for Promotion play-offs
4	Cabinteely (Q)	27	14	8	5	39	28	+11	50	Qualification for Promotion play-offs
5	Bray Wanderers	27	14	4	9	44	26	+18	46	
6	Cobh Ramblers	27	8	7	12	38	51	−13	31	
7	Galway United	27	7	5	15	36	42	−6	26	
8	Athlone Town	27	4	6	17	30	61	−31	18	
9	Wexford	27	2	5	20	22	65	−43	11	
10	Limerick	27	10	6	11	33	41	−8	10 (Note: Limerick were deducted 26 points for failure to comply with LOI profitability and sustainability rules.)	

Source: SSE Airtricity League, Soccerway
Rules for classification: 1) Points; 2) Goal difference; 3) Goals scored.
(C) Champions; (P) Promoted; (Q) Qualified for the phase indicated

== Results ==
=== Matches 1–18 ===
Teams play each other twice (once at home, once away).

Home \ Away	ATH	BRW	CAB	COB	DRO	GAL	LIM	LON	SHE	WEX
Athlone Town	—	0–5	2–2	1–1	3–5	0–4	1–1	0–1	0–2	4–2
Bray Wanderers	0–1	—	1–1	1–0	3–1	2–1	2–0	3–2	0–1	2–1
Cabinteely	3–2	0–3	—	2–2	0–5	1–0	1–2	1–1	1–0	2–0
Cobh Ramblers	0–1	1–0	0–1	—	1–4	2–1	2–3	0–0	2–1	6–1
Drogheda United	4–2	1–0	1–4	4–0	—	3–0	3–2	0–1	0–0	2–1
Galway United	1–1	0–1	0–0	1–2	0–1	—	0–1	2–1	2–3	2–0
Limerick	2–0	1–0	1–0	3–1	0–0	2–1	—	0–0	0–1	1–1
Longford Town	3–1	2–0	0–1	1–0	3–0	2–1	1–0	—	2–0	1–0
Shelbourne	2–1	1–0	2–3	1–0	2–1	3–0	2–0	1–0	—	3–0
Wexford	2–0	2–0	0–2	2–2	1–2	0–4	0–0	1–2	1–2	—

First match(es) will be played: 22 February 2019. Source: SSE Airtricity League
Legend: Blue = home team win; Yellow = draw; Red = away team win.

=== Matches 19–27 ===
Teams play each other once.

Home \ Away	ATH	BRW	CAB	COB	DRO	GAL	LIM	LON	SHE	WEX
Athlone Town	—	—	—	—	0–2		—	1–5	1–2	3–1
Bray Wanderers	3–0	—	—	3–3		—	1–0	—	—	—
Cabinteely	3–1	2–1	—	—	—	0–1	3–0	2–0	—	—
Cobh Ramblers	2–1	—	1–1	—	—	—	—		1–0	1–1
Drogheda United	—	—	0–0	4–2	—	—	—	—	1–3	6–0
Galway United	—	2–2	—	7–1	1–3	—		—	0–3	—
Limerick	1–1	—	—	3–4	1–4	—	—	3–1	—	4–1
Longford Town	—	1–2	—	—	2–1	4–0	—	—	0–2	—
Shelbourne	—	0–0	1–1	—	—	—		—	—	5–2
Wexford	—	1–5	1–2	—	—	0–0	—	0–2	—	—

First match(es) will be played: 05 July 2019. Source: SSE Airtricity League
Legend: Blue = home team win; Yellow = draw; Red = away team win.

== Season statistics ==
=== Top scorers ===
Rank	Player	Club	Goals
1	(Republic of Ireland) Rob Manley	Cabinteely	17
2	(Republic of Ireland) Chris Lyons	Drogheda United	13
3	(Republic of Ireland) Dean Byrne	Longford Town	12
3	(Republic of Ireland) Mark Doyle	Drogheda United	12
5	(Republic of Ireland) Ciarán Kilduff	Shelbourne	10
5	(Republic of Ireland) Dylan McGlade	Bray Wanderers	10
5	(Republic of Ireland) Stephen Meaney	Drogheda United	10
8	(Republic of Ireland) Danny Furlong	Wexford	9
9	(Republic of Ireland) Jaze Kabia	Shelbourne	8
9	(Republic of Ireland) Sam Verdon	Longford Town	8

Last updated: 25 September 2019.
Source: SSE Airtricity League of Ireland

== Play-offs ==
=== 3rd vs. 4th-place play-off ===
4 October 2019	Cabinteely	0-0	Longford Town	Stradbrook Road

11 October 2019	Longford Town	1-1 (1-1 agg.)	Cabinteely	Strokestown Road

Cabinteely advances on away goals.

=== 2nd vs. Winner 3rd/4th play-off ===
18 October 2019	Cabinteely	1-1	Drogheda United	Stradbrook Road

25 October 2019	Drogheda United	5-1 (6-2 agg.)	Cabinteely	United Park

=== Promotion/relegation playoff ===
27 October 2019	Drogheda United	1-0	Finn Harps	United Park

31 October 2019	Finn Harps	2-0 (2-1 agg.)	Drogheda United	Finn Park

== See also ==
- 2019 League of Ireland Premier Division
- 2019 League of Ireland Cup
