= 2025 FAI Cup final =

- Event: 2025 FAI Cup
Shamrock Rovers	Cork City
2	0
- Date: 9 November 2025
- Venue: Aviva Stadium, Dublin
- Referee: Paul Norton
- Attendance: 35,252

The 2025 FAI Cup final, known as the 2025 Sports Direct FAI Cup final for sponsorship reasons, was the final match of the 2025 FAI Cup, the national association football cup of the Republic of Ireland. The match took place on Sunday 9 November 2025 at the Aviva Stadium in Dublin, between Shamrock Rovers and Cork City.

Shamrock Rovers won the match 2-0 and claimed a first FAI Cup since 2019. It was the first double for Shamrock Rovers since 1987.

== Match ==
=== Summary ===
In the 44th minute, Cork City were reduced to ten men when Harry Nevin received a straight red card for a high challenge on Josh Honohan. In the 65th minute, Shamrock Rovers took the lead when Rory Gaffney finished to the right of the net from close range after a volleyed pass from Dylan Watts from the right. It was 2-0 in the 71st minute with Rory Gaffney getting his second when he got in on goal on the right before a low finish past the goalkeeper and into the left corner of the net.

=== Details ===
9 November 2025
15:00

Shamrock Rovers	2–0	Cork City
Gaffney 65', 71'	Report	Nevin (red card) 43'

Aviva Stadium, Ballsbridge, Dublin 4
Attendance: 35,252
Referee: Paul Norton

Shamrock Rovers	Cork City

GK	1	(Republic of Ireland) Ed McGinty
RWB	21	(Republic of Ireland) Danny Grant
CB	4	(Cape Verde) Roberto Lopes (c)
CB	6	(Republic of Ireland) Daniel Cleary
CB	27	(Republic of Ireland) Cory O'Sullivan
LWB	2	(Republic of Ireland) Josh Honohan	(substituted off) 88'
CM	7	(Republic of Ireland) Dylan Watts	(substituted off) 78'
CM	8	(Republic of Ireland) Aaron McEneff
CM	17	(Republic of Ireland) Matt Healy
AM	10	(Republic of Ireland) Graham Burke	(substituted off) 88'
ST	20	(Republic of Ireland) Rory Gaffney	65', 71'	(substituted off) 78'
Substitutes:
GK	25	(Republic of Ireland) Lee Steacy
RB	3	(Wales) Adam Matthews
CB	5	(Republic of Ireland) Lee Grace	(substituted on) 88'
LB	11	(Republic of Ireland) Seán Kavanagh	(substituted on) 88'
AM	14	(Republic of Ireland) Danny Mandroiu	(substituted on) 78'	(substituted off) 84'
CM	15	(Republic of Ireland) Darragh Nugent
CM	22	(Republic of Ireland) Cian Barrett
CM	23	(England) Connor Malley	(substituted on) 84'
ST	88	(Northern Ireland) John McGovern	(substituted on) 78'
Manager:
(Republic of Ireland) Stephen Bradley

GK	13	(Republic of Ireland) Conor Brann
RWB	2	(Republic of Ireland) Harry Nevin	(red card) 43'
CB	4	(Republic of Ireland) Fiacre Kelleher	(substituted off) 71'
CB	23	(United States) Freddie Anderson
CB	28	(Republic of Ireland) Rory Feely
LWB	17	(Republic of Ireland) Darragh Crowley
CM	6	(Republic of Ireland) Greg Bolger	(substituted off) 71'
CM	8	(Republic of Ireland) Evan McLaughlin	(substituted off) 75'
RW	10	(Republic of Ireland) Alex Nolan	(substituted off) 45'
ST	24	(Republic of Ireland) Sean Maguire
LW	20	(Republic of Ireland) Josh Fitzpatrick
Substitutes:
GK	1	(Republic of Ireland) David Odumosu
CB	5	(Republic of Ireland) Charlie Lyons
ST	9	(Republic of Ireland) Ruairí Keating	(substituted on) 75'
CM	14	(England) Kitt Nelson
LW	15	(Republic of Ireland) Conor Drinan	(substituted on) 45'
CM	16	(England) Sean Murray
LB	19	(Republic of Ireland) Matthew Kiernan
CM	25	(Republic of Ireland) Matthew Murray	(substituted on) 71'
CM	31	(England) Kaedyn Kamara	(substituted on) 71'
Manager:
(Republic of Ireland) Ger Nash
