= Bastien Héry =

Footballer (born 1992)

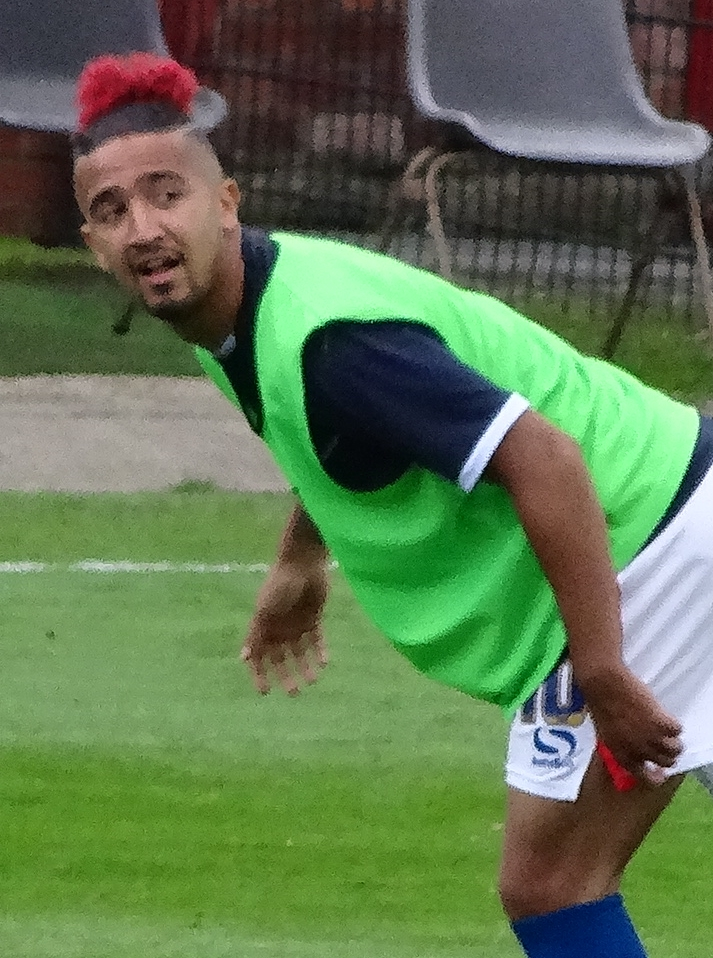
- Héry warming up for Carlisle United in 2015

Personal information
- Full name: Bastien Charles Patrick Héry
- Date of birth: 23 March 1992 (age 34)
- Place of birth: Brou-sur-Chantereine, Paris, France
- Height: 1.75 m (5 ft 9 in)
- Position: Midfielder

Youth career
- 1998–2006: US Torcy
- 2006–2010: Paris Saint-Germain

Senior career*
| Years | Team | Apps | (Gls) |
| 2010–2012 | Paris Saint-Germain II | 17 | (1) |
| 2012–2013 | Sheffield Wednesday | 0 | (0) |
| 2013–2015 | Rochdale | 33 | (2) |
| 2015–2016 | Carlisle United | 20 | (0) |
| 2016–2017 | Accrington Stanley | 1 | (0) |
| 2017 | Limerick | 29 | (1) |
| 2018–2019 | Waterford | 51 | (5) |
| 2019–2020 | Linfield | 29 | (2) |
| 2021 | Bohemians | 5 | (0) |
| 2021 | → Derry City (loan) | 9 | (0) |
| 2022 | Finn Harps | 18 | (0) |
| 2022 | → Galway United (loan) | 8 | (0) |
| 2023–2024 | Longford Town | 39 | (1) |
| 2025 | Athlone Town | 10 | (0) |
| 2025 | Lucan United | | |
| Total | | 269 | (12) |

International career^{‡}
| 2009 | France U18 | 2 | (0) |
| 2020–2022 | Madagascar | 9 | (0) |
- * Club domestic league appearances and goals as of 17:43, 22 May 2025 (UTC) ‡ National team caps and goals as of 12:18, 28 December 2024 (UTC)

Bastien Charles Patrick Héry (born 23 March 1992) is a retired professional footballer who played as a midfielder. Born in France, he plays for the Madagascar national team.

== Club career ==
=== Early career ===
Born in Brou-sur-Chantereine, France, Héry started playing football when he was six and joined US Torcy. Héry then joined Paris Saint-Germain. Héry revealed he went on a trial at Toulouse, Strasbourg and Auxerre.

After two years at PSG since turning professional, Héry was released by the club before joining EFL Championship club Sheffield Wednesday in the summer of 2012. Héry stated moving to England helped him cope leaving PSG.

=== Rochdale ===
Having been unable to break into the Sheffield Wednesday side Héry joined League Two side Rochdale on 8 May 2013 on a free transfer. Upon joining Rochdale, Héry was given the number fourteen shirt.

He made his professional debut on 6 August 2013 in a Football League Cup match at Doncaster Rovers. Soon after, Héry spoke about his move to Rochdale, quoting: "Last season at Sheffield Wednesday I only played in the development squad so this is my first experience of first team football and I'm enjoying it. I have learnt more in three months here playing first team football than I did during one year with the development squad." Héry scored his first goal for the club on 12 October 2013, in a 3–0 win over Newport County. After only making twelve appearances that season, Rochdale were promoted to League One. Héry signed a new two-year contract with Rochdale on 27 June 2014.

In 2014–15 season, Héry scored his first goal of the season, in a 3–2 win against Swindon Town on 21 October 2014. In his second season at Rochdale, Héry made twenty-eight appearances and scoring once in all competition, as Rochdale remained in League One for another season.

Héry was subject to a media report in February 2015 which suggested that he had called the town of his home club a "dump", Héry denied the report was accurate and stated he had been misquoted by the French media from which the interview was conducted. On 24 June 2015, Héry left Rochdale by mutual consent.

=== Carlisle United ===
On 24 June 2015, Héry joined League Two side Carlisle United on a one-year contract. Héry gained national recognition for his performance in the third round of the League Cup, assisting Derek Asamoah in a goal against Liverpool to draw the game 1–1 at full time. The game went to a penalty shootout and Héry missed the decisive kick which eliminated Carlisle.

=== Accrington Stanley ===
Héry left Carlisle at the end of the 2015–16 season to join league two play-off finalists Accrington Stanley for the 2016–17 season on an initial one-year contract with a view to extend for a second.

=== Limerick ===
On 22 January 2017 Héry signed for League of Ireland Premier Division side Limerick for the 2017 season. Initially used as a substitute, Hery eventually won a starting place and his performances in midfield won him both awards for both man-of-the-match and Player of the Month. His one goal of the 2017 season came when he scored a crucial last-minute goal at home to Bray to put Limerick 4–3 in front.

=== Waterford ===
Héry signed for Waterford for the 2018 League of Ireland Premier Division season. Héry made his debut in a 2–1 win against Derry City on 17 February 2018. He scored his first goal for the club against St Patrick's Athletic in a 2–0 win in 2018 . After a series of impressive performances for Waterford, Héry signed a two-year extension to his contract.

Héry won the 2018 Senior Player of the Year as well as the 2018 Goal of the Season for his strike in the 2–0 February win against St. Patrick's Athletic.
Héry was also named on the 2018 League of Ireland Team of the Year.

=== Linfield ===
On 9 July 2019, it was confirmed that Héry had joined Linfield in a transfer deal that saw striker Michael O'Connor join Waterford on loan.

The next day, he impressed in his debut game for Linfield at home against Rosenberg in a 2–0 defeat in the 2019–20 UEFA Champions League first qualifying round. A 6–0 aggregate defeat saw Linfield drop down into the UEFA Europa League second qualifying round Champions Path, where they faced Faroese champions HB Tórshavn. A 3–2 win on aggregate secured a place in the third qualifying round of the Europa League for the first time. After the win, Linfield goalkeeper Gareth Deane praised Héry, saying "His ability on the ball and passing is superb. He's also so calm and collected in possession. He wants to get on the ball and take possession even if there are two men up his back. He's been fabulous so far". Linfield faced Montenegro champions Sutjeska in the Europa League third qualifying round. They won 2–1 in the away leg with Héry setting up the winner with a through ball to Kirk Miller. This was followed up with a 3–2 win in the second leg at Windsor Park, with Linfield winning 5–3 on aggregate to become the first Irish League side to reach the play-off round of the Europa League. In the play-off round, the Blues were drawn to face Azerbaijan champions Qarabağ, with the winners qualifying for the Europa League group stage. After winning 3–2 at home, they lost the away tie 2–1 to exit the Europa League under the away goals rule.

Héry won a league medal as Linfield were crowned Champions of the Northern Ireland Football League for 2020. Héry scored his first goal in European competition with a strike in Linfield's 2–0 victory over Tre Fiori of San Marino in the preliminary round of the UEFA Champions League on 8 August 2020.

=== Bohemians ===
On 16 January 2021, Bastien Héry signed for Dublin club Bohemians in the League of Ireland Premier Division. After making just 1 start and 4 more appearances off the bench from Bohs' first 24 games, he was linked with a loan out from the club, departing on 27 July 2021 to Derry City.

==== Derry City loan ====
Héry signed for Derry City on loan until the end of the season on 27 July 2021. He made his debut on 31 July 2021, coming off the bench in a 2–0 win away to Longford Town at Bishopsgate.

=== Finn Harps ===
On 14 January 2022, it was announced that Héry had joined Derry City's local rivals Finn Harps on a permanent basis, his fifth League of Ireland club.

==== Galway United loan ====
On 29 July 2022, League of Ireland First Division side Galway United announced that Héry would be joining on loan from Finn Harps for the remainder of the 2022 season. He made his debut 2 days later in a 7–0 win over Bluebell United in the FAI Cup.

=== Longford Town ===
After 6 months out of the game following his departure from Finn Harps, League of Ireland First Division club Longford Town announced the signing of Héry on 15 July 2023. On the same day, he was sent off for a red card offence just 2 minutes after coming on as a substitute for his debut against Kerry.

=== Athlone Town ===
On 28 December 2024, it was announced that Héry would be joining Longford's midlands rivals Athlone Town ahead of the 2025 season. After making 13 appearances in all competitions for the club, it was announced on 22 May 2025 that he had been released along with 4 of his teammates.

== International career ==
Bastien Héry has represented the Madagascar national football team. He was born in France, and is of Malagasy descent. He is a youth international for France. He was called up to represent Madagascar national football team for Africa Cup of Nations qualifiers in March 2020. He debuted for Madagascar in a friendly 2–1 loss to Burkina Faso on 11 October 2020.

Héry won his fourth international cap for Madagascar in a World Cup Qualifier defeat to Tanzania on 7 September 2021.

== Personal life ==
Bastien Héry was born in Torcy, Paris, to parents from Reunion Island.

Héry has two children, a daughter and a son.

In 2021, Héry appeared in a street football film Un Ballon created by Peil Star. The film was shot in East Belfast.

== Career statistics ==
=== Club ===
As of match played on 25 April 2025

Appearances and goals by club, season and competition
| Club | Season | League | | | National Cup (Note: Includes Coupe de France, FA Cup, FAI Cup & Irish Cup) | | League Cup (Note: Includes Coupe de la Ligue, EFL Cup, League of Ireland Cup & Northern Ireland Football League Cup) | | Europe | | Other | | Total | |
| Club | Season | Division | Apps | Goals | Apps | Goals | Apps | Goals | Apps | Goals | Apps | Goals | Apps | Goals |
|---|---|---|---|---|---|---|---|---|---|---|---|---|---|---|
| Paris Saint-Germain II | 2010–11 | National 2 | 4 | 1 | – | | – | | – | | – | | 4 | 1 |
| Paris Saint-Germain II | 2011–12 | National 2 | 13 | 0 | – | | – | | – | | – | | 13 | 0 |
| Paris Saint-Germain II | Total | | 17 | 1 | – | | – | | – | | – | | 17 | 1 |
| Sheffield Wednesday | 2012–13 | Championship | 0 | 0 | 0 | 0 | 0 | 0 | – | | – | | 0 | 0 |
| Rochdale | 2013–14 | League Two | 12 | 1 | 0 | 0 | 1 | 0 | – | | 1 | 0 | 14 | 1 |
| Rochdale | 2014–15 | League One | 21 | 1 | 4 | 0 | 1 | 0 | – | | 2 | 0 | 28 | 1 |
| Rochdale | Total | | 33 | 2 | 4 | 0 | 2 | 0 | – | | 3 | 0 | 42 | 2 |
| Carlisle United | 2015–16 | League Two | 20 | 0 | 2 | 0 | 2 | 0 | – | | 1 | 0 | 25 | 0 |
| Accrington Stanley | 2016–17 | League Two | 1 | 0 | 0 | 0 | 0 | 0 | – | | 1 | 0 | 2 | 0 |
| Limerick | 2017 | LOI Premier Division | 29 | 1 | 4 | 0 | 1 | 0 | – | | 0 | 0 | 34 | 1 |
| Waterford | 2018 | LOI Premier Division | 31 | 4 | 3 | 1 | 2 | 0 | – | | 0 | 0 | 36 | 5 |
| Waterford | 2019 | LOI Premier Division | 20 | 1 | – | | 2 | 0 | – | | 0 | 0 | 22 | 1 |
| Waterford | Total | | 51 | 5 | 3 | 1 | 4 | 0 | – | | 0 | 0 | 58 | 6 |
| Linfield | 2019–20 | NIFL Premiership | 22 | 2 | 1 | 0 | 3 | 0 | 8 (Note: Two appearances in UEFA Champions League, six appearances in UEFA Europa League) | 0 | 2 (Note: Appearances in Champions Cup) | 0 | 36 | 2 |
| Linfield | 2020–21 | NIFL Premiership | 7 | 0 | 0 | 0 | 0 | 0 | 3 (Note: Two appearances in UEFA Champions League, one appearance in UEFA Europa League) | 1 | 1 (Note: Appearances in County Antrim Shield) | 0 | 11 | 1 |
| Linfield | Total | | 29 | 2 | 1 | 0 | 3 | 0 | 11 | 1 | 3 | 0 | 47 | 3 |
| Bohemians | 2021 | LOI Premier Division | 5 | 0 | 0 | 0 | — | | 0 | 0 | — | | 5 | 0 |
| Derry City (loan) | 2021 | LOI Premier Division | 9 | 0 | 1 | 0 | — | | — | | — | | 10 | 0 |
| Finn Harps | 2022 | LOI Premier Division | 18 | 0 | — | | — | | — | | — | | 18 | 0 |
| Galway United (loan) | 2022 | LOI First Division | 8 | 0 | 2 | 0 | — | | — | | 2 (Note: Appearances in 2022 League of Ireland First Division Play-offs) | 0 | 12 | 0 |
| Longford Town | 2023 | LOI First Division | 10 | 0 | 0 | 0 | — | | — | | – | | 10 | 0 |
| Longford Town | 2024 | LOI First Division | 29 | 1 | 1 | 0 | — | | — | | 0 | 0 | 30 | 1 |
| Longford Town | Total | | 39 | 1 | 1 | 0 | — | | — | | 0 | 0 | 40 | 1 |
| Athlone Town | 2025 | LOI First Division | 10 | 0 | — | | — | | — | | 3 (Note: Appearances in the Leinster Senior Cup) | 0 | 13 | 0 |
| Career total | | | 269 | 12 | 18 | 1 | 12 | 0 | 11 | 1 | 13 | 0 | 323 | 14 |

=== International ===
As of match played 27 September 2022

Appearances and goals by national team and year
| National team | Year | Apps | Goals |
|---|---|---|---|
| Madagascar | 2020 | 2 | 0 |
| Madagascar | 2021 | 4 | 0 |
| Madagascar | 2022 | 3 | 0 |
| Total | | 9 | 0 |

== Honours ==
Linfield

- NIFL Premiership: 2019–20

Individual

- PFAI Team of the Year: 2018 Premier Division
