= Max Hemmings =

English footballer

Personal information
- Full name: Maxwell Frederick Riddles Hemmings
- Date of birth: 27 February 1997 (age 29)
- Place of birth: Brighton, England
- Position: Midfielder

College career
Years	Team	Apps	(Gls)
2015–2018	Georgia State Panthers	72	(19)

Senior career*
Years	Team	Apps	(Gls)
2016	Memphis City FC		
2017–2018	Ocean City Nor'easters	21	(4)
2019–2022	Greenville Triumph	43	(0)
2022	Galway United	26	(3)
2023–2024	Weymouth	8	(0)
2024–2025	Hemel Hempstead Town	5	(0)
2024	→ Bracknell Town (loan)	4	(0)
2025–2026	Swindon Supermarine	33	(0)
2026	Bracknell Town	2	(0)
- * Club domestic league appearances and goals as of 21:27, 18 October 2026 (UTC)

Maxwell Frederick Riddles Hemmings (born 27 February 1997) is an English footballer who plays as a midfielder.

== Career ==
=== College ===
In 2015, Hemmings joined Georgia State University's men's soccer team who compete in the NCAA Division 1 Sunbelt Conference. Hemmings started in 71 out of 74 games for the Panthers receiving multiple honors, including First Team All-Conference and All-Tournament Team when Georgia State won both the conference regular season and tournament in 2018. Captaining the side in his final year, Hemmings was the talisman for the Panthers. Hemmings finished his Georgia State career with 19 goals and 10 assists from center midfield.

Max Hemmings was part of a select few players across the country to be in the January 2019 MLS Super Draft List.

=== Professional ===
Max Hemmings signed his first professional contract in April 2019 with USL League One side Greenville Triumph.

On 20 February 2022, Hemmings signed for League of Ireland First Division side Galway United ahead of their upcoming 2022 season.

Having featured seven times for the club at the end of the previous season, Hemmings agreed to remain at National League South club Weymouth for the 2023–24 season.

In June 2025, Hemmings joined Southern League Premier Division South side Swindon Supermarine, reuniting with manager Bobby Wilkinson who had previously signed the midfielder at both Weymouth and Hemel Hempstead Town.

Hemmings signed for Bracknell Town in June 2026.
