= Conor Brann =

Irish footballer (born 2003)

Personal information
- Full name: Conor Paul Brann
- Date of birth: 27 June 2003 (age 23)
- Place of birth: Galway, Ireland
- Position: Goalkeeper

Team information
- Current team: Cork City
- Number: 1

Youth career
- –2018: Salthill Devon
- 2018: Athlone Town
- 2019–2020: Limerick
- 2021–2022: Galway United

Senior career*
Years	Team	Apps	(Gls)
2022	Galway United	0	(0)
2022–2024	Swindon Town	0	(0)
2023–2024	→ Swindon Supermarine (loan)	17	(0)
2025–	Cork City	45	(0)
- * Club domestic league appearances and goals as of 16:21, 10 November 2026

Conor Paul Brann (born 27 June 2003) is an Irish professional footballer who plays as a goalkeeper for League of Ireland Premier Division club Cork City.

== Club career ==
=== Early career ===
Galway native Brann began playing football with local side Salthill Devon, then moved to the academies of League of Ireland clubs Athlone Town, Limerick and Galway United.

=== Galway United ===
Having impressed in the academy, Brann began training with the Galway United first team in 2021. His first involvement in a first-team match day squad was on 27 May 2022, when he was an unused substitute in a 1–0 defeat to Cork City at Eamonn Deacy Park.

=== Swindon Town ===
On 1 September 2022, Brann joined EFL League Two club Swindon Town as a free-agent, having been released by Galway United. He was an unused substitute on 22 occasions for the first team but failed to make his debut before suffering a serious knee injury in his final season and he departed the club in April of 2024 after being released at the end of his contract. After being released, he then trained with Cork City for several months on a non-contract basis, during which time he considered quitting football before being convinced to continue by his father.

==== Swindon Supermarine loan ====
On 29 September 2023, he was loaned out to Swindon Supermarine on a three month long loan deal. Brann impressed during his loan spell, being named the club's Player of the Month for December 2023 and saw his loan deal extended by a month until the end of January 2024. He made a total of 19 appearances in all competitions before being recalled from his loan spell.

=== Cork City ===
On 9 December 2024, Brann signed for newly promoted League of Ireland Premier Division club Cork City ahead of their 2025 season. He was initially signed as a second choice goalkeeper behind loanee first choice keeper Tein Troost in the pecking order. He made his debut on 4 July 2025 after Troost's loan deal ended, featuring in a 3–1 loss away to Shelbourne at Tolka Park and keeping the first choice keeper spot until the end of the season. On 15 August 2025, Brann signed a new long-term contract with the club. He made 16 appearances in all competitions in his first season with the club as they were relegated to the League of Ireland First Division, though they did make the 2025 FAI Cup final which Brann featured in as they were defeated 2–0 at the Aviva Stadium by Shamrock Rovers.

== International career ==
In February 2022, Brann was named in a training camp for the Republic of Ireland U19s, but ultimately was never capped in a game for the side. Having not been capped at any youth international level and playing in the second tier of the League of Ireland, Brann was a surprise call-up to the senior Republic of Ireland squad in May 2026 for their friendly games against Qatar and Canada.

== Career statistics ==
As of match played on 16 October 2026

Appearances and goals by club, season and competition
Club	Season	League			National Cup (Note: Includes FAI Cup & FA Cup)		League Cup (Note: Includes EFL Cup)		Other		Total	
Club	Season	Division	Apps	Goals	Apps	Goals	Apps	Goals	Apps	Goals	Apps	Goals
Galway United	2022	LOI First Division	0	0	0	0	–		–		0	0
Swindon Town	2022–23	EFL League Two	0	0	0	0	0	0	0 (Note: Appearances in the EFL Trophy)	0	0	0
Swindon Town	2023–24	EFL League Two	0	0	0	0	0	0	0	0	0	0
Swindon Town	Total		0	0	0	0	0	0	0	0	0	0
Swindon Supermarine (loan)	2023–24	Southern Football League	17	0	–		–		2 (Note: Appearances in the FA Trophy)	0	19	0
Cork City	2025	LOI Premier Division	11	0	5	0	–		0 (Note: Appearances in the Munster Senior Cup)	0	16	0
Cork City	2026	LOI First Division	34	0	1	0	–		0	0	35	0
Cork City	Total		45	0	6	0	–		0	0	51	0
Career total			62	0	6	0	0	0	2	0	70	0
