= 2016 League of Ireland First Division =

League of Ireland First Division
- Season: 2016
- Champions: Limerick
- Promoted: Limerick; Drogheda United
- Matches: 112
- Goals: 349 (3.12 per match)
- Top goalscorer: Gary O'Neil (13 goals)
- Biggest home win: Limerick 6–1 Cobh Ramblers (19 March 2016); Limerick 7–2 Waterford United (30 April 2016)
- Biggest away win: Waterford United 1–8 UCD (30 September 2016)
- Highest scoring: Limerick 7–2 Waterford United (30 April 2016); Waterford United 1–8 UCD (30 September 2016)
- Total attendance: 52,987
- Average attendance: 477

The 2016 League of Ireland First Division season was the 32nd season of the League of Ireland First Division.

On 28 August, Limerick clinched the title and promotion after a 3–2 win away to UCD.

== Overview ==
The First Division has 8 teams. Each team played each other four times, twice at home and twice away, for a total of 28 matches in the season.

The eight clubs competed for a prize fund of €104,000 with the winners receiving €30,000 and the eighth placed team collecting €8,000.

== Teams ==
Locations of the First Division teams
Locations of Dublin First Division teams

Team	Home city/suburb	Stadium
Athlone Town	Athlone	Athlone Town Stadium
Cabinteely	Cabinteely	Stradbrook Road
Cobh Ramblers	Cobh	St. Colman's Park
Drogheda United	Drogheda	United Park
Limerick	Limerick	Markets Field
Shelbourne	Drumcondra, Dublin	Tolka Park
UCD	Belfield, Dublin	UCD Bowl
Waterford United	Waterford	Waterford RSC

=== Personnel and kits ===
Note: Flags indicate national team as has been defined under FIFA eligibility rules. Players may hold more than one non-FIFA nationality.

Team	Manager	Captain	Kit manufacturer	Shirt sponsor
Athlone Town	(Republic of Ireland) Alan Mathews		Nike	Nitro Sports
Cabinteely	(Republic of Ireland) Eddie Gormley		Umbro	
Cobh Ramblers	(Republic of Ireland) Stephen Henderson	(Republic of Ireland) Kevin Mulcahy	Legea	Rathcormac Fuels
Drogheda United	(Republic of Ireland) Pete Mahon	(Republic of Ireland) Sean Thornton	CX+ Sport	Scotch Hall Shopping Center
Limerick	(Republic of Ireland) Martin Russell	(Republic of Ireland) Shane Duggan	Hummel	Galtee Fuels
Shelbourne	(Republic of Ireland) Kevin Doherty	(Republic of Ireland) Daire Doyle	Macron	abbeyseals.ie
UCD	(Republic of Ireland) Collie O'Neill	(Republic of Ireland) Gary O'Neill	O'Neills	O'Neills
Waterford United	(Republic of Ireland) Roddy Collins	(Republic of Ireland) Phillip Gorman	Uhlsport	

== League table ==
Pos	Team	Pld	W	D	L	GF	GA	GD	Pts	Qualification
1	Limerick (C, P)	28	24	3	1	86	26	+60	75	Promotion to League of Ireland Premier Division
2	Drogheda United (O, P)	28	15	7	6	42	29	+13	52	Qualification for Promotion play-offs
3	Cobh Ramblers	28	15	5	8	40	33	+7	50	Qualification for Promotion play-offs
4	UCD	28	14	6	8	57	40	+17	48	
5	Waterford United	28	10	3	15	43	65	−22	33	
6	Shelbourne	28	9	3	16	36	40	−4	30	
7	Cabinteely	28	4	4	20	19	54	−35	16	
8	Athlone Town	28	3	5	20	26	62	−36	14	

Source: Soccerway, extratime.ie
Rules for classification: 1) Points; 2) Goal difference; 3) Goals scored.
(C) Champions; (O) Play-off winners; (P) Promoted

== Results ==
=== Matches 1–14 ===
Teams played each other twice (once at home, once away)

Home \ Away	ATH	CAB	COB	DRO	LIM	SHE	UCD	WAT
Athlone Town		3–1	0–2	1–2	0–5	1–3	1–2	3–3
Cabinteely	2–1		1–2	0–0	0–2	0–4	0–0	0–2
Cobh Ramblers	2–2	2–0		1–1	0–3	1–0	0–2	4–0
Drogheda United	2–2	4–0	1–0		0–3	1–0	1–2	2–1
Limerick	3–0	3–0	6–1	2–2		5–1	4–1	7–2
Shelbourne	2–1	1–1	0–1	3–0	3–4		1–2	0–2
UCD	1–1	2–1	3–1	2–2	1–2	2–0		1–3
Waterford United	3–0 (Note: Waterford were awarded a 3–0 result for the match, with Athlone forfeiting the fixture. Athlone Town were also fined €1,000 and stripped of home advantage for their August clash with Waterford United after they failed to fulfil the First Division fixture between the two sides.)	3–1	1–2	1–2	2–5	1–4	3–1	

Source: Soccerway
Legend: Blue = home team win; Yellow = draw; Red = away team win.

=== Matches 15–28 ===
Teams played each other twice (once at home, once away)

Home \ Away	ATH	CAB	COB	DRO	LIM	SHE	UCD	WAT
Athlone Town		4–0	0–2	0–1	0–2	1–0	1–1	1–3 (Note: This match was played in Waterford, due to the earlier league ruling that stripped Athlone of home field advantage due to the non-fulfillment of a previous fixture between the two sides.)
Cabinteely	5–1		1–3	1–0	0–1	1–2	0–2	2–0
Cobh Ramblers	2–1	3–0		2–1	2–0	0–0	1–1	3–1
Drogheda United	1–0	1–0	2–0		3–3	2–0	1–2	2–0
Limerick	1–0	2–0	2–0	2–1		2–0	4–3	4–0
Shelbourne	3–0	2–1	2–0	0–2	1–1		1–2	0–1
UCD	5–1	4–1	0–1	1–1	2–3	3–2		2–1
Waterford United	3–0	0–0	2–2	1–3	1–5	2–1	1–8	

Source: Soccerway
Legend: Blue = home team win; Yellow = draw; Red = away team win.

== Promotion/relegation playoffs ==
=== First Division ===
22 October 2016	Cobh Ramblers	0–2	Drogheda United	Cobh
19:15 IST (UTC+01:00)		Report	Griffin 60'; McCaffrey 62'	Stadium: St Colman's Park; Attendance: 1,550; Referee: Andrew Mullally

28 October 2016	Drogheda United	1–2 (3–2 agg.)	Cobh Ramblers	Drogheda
19:45 IST (UTC+01:00)	McCaffrey 60'	Report	Ellis 1'; Comerford 9'	Stadium: United Park; Attendance: 1,873; Referee: Andrew Mullally

Drogheda United advanced to the promotion/relegation play-offs against Wexford Youths.

=== First Division vs Premier Division ===
31 October 2016	Wexford Youths	2–0	Drogheda United	Crossabeg
19:45 GMT	Furlong 66'; Chin 90+1'	Report		Stadium: Ferrycarrig Park; Referee: Raymond Matthews

4 November 2016	Drogheda United	3–0 (3–2 agg.)	Wexford Youths	Drogheda
19:45 GMT	Brennan 45+1'; Farragher 58'; Thornton 78' (pen.)	Report		Stadium: United Park

Drogheda United are promoted to the 2017 Premier Division; Wexford Youths are relegated to the 2017 First Division.

== See also ==
- 2016 League of Ireland Premier Division
- 2016 League of Ireland Cup
