= Pat Devlin (footballer) =

Irish footballer, manager, and club director

Personal information
- Full name: Patrick Devlin
- Date of birth: 23 April 1953 (age 73)
- Place of birth: Dublin, Ireland
- Position: Forward

Youth career
- 1966–1970: St Joseph's Boys

Senior career*
| Years | Team | Apps | (Gls) |
| 1970–1971 | Shamrock Rovers | 0 | (0) |
| 1971–1973 | T.E.K. United | | |
| 1973–1974 | St Patrick's Athletic | | |
| 1974–1976 | T.E.K. United | | |
| 1976–1977 | Dalkey United | | |
| 1977–1985 | T.E.K. United | | |
| 1987–1988 | Bray Wanderers | 5 | (1) |

International career
| 1970 | Republic of Ireland U17 | 1 | (0) |

Managerial career
- 1986–1990: Bray Wanderers
- 1991–1992: Athlone Town
- 1992–1993: Drogheda United
- 1995–2006: Bray Wanderers
- 2010–2011: Bray Wanderers
- 2012–2013: Bray Wanderers
- 2015–2016: UCD
- 2017–2021: Cabinteely
- 2022-2025: Bray Wanderers
- * Club domestic league appearances and goals

Pat Devlin (born 23 April 1953) is an Irish former football player and manager who was most recently director of football of Bray Wanderers.

== Playing career ==
Devlin was born in Dublin. For a short spell during his T.E.K. tenure he played for Dalkey United, where he achieved a career highlight by scoring the winning goal against Limerick in a 1976 FAI Cup tie at the Market's Field.

== Management career ==
As player-manager he made his League of Ireland debut for Bray on St Patrick's Day 1988 in a 3–0 home win over Sligo and his only goal came at Richmond Park (football ground) on 1 April where he was also sent off.

Devlin departed just before Christmas 1990 to link up with Noel King at Shamrock Rovers by becoming their Technical Director. However his tenure at the RDS Arena didn't work out and Devlin moved to manage Athlone Town. After a season at Drogheda he moved back to Bray in 1995 and steered them to winning the League of Ireland First Division Shield and the League of Ireland First Division title. On the back of this he was appointed manager of the League of Ireland First Division XI and the following season in charge of the League of Ireland XI.

In January 2002 Devlin celebrated his 500th game in charge of The Seagulls. In May 2004 he was appointed manager of the National League Under-21s. He stepped down from Bray in March 2006 to take charge of the Republic of Ireland B national football team.

Under Devlin Bray are the only team in history to have entered both the Cup Winners' Cup (1990) and UEFA Cup (1999) while playing at the second level domestically.

Ahead of the 2017 season, Devlin was appointed Director of Football and First team Manager of Cabinteely FC. He returned to Bray Wanderers in December 2021.

=== Return to Bray Wanderers ===
Since Devlin's return to Bray Wanderers the relationship with supporters has been poor. Incidents have included Devlin telling loyal fans not to support the team or attend matches on local radio station East Coast FM, threatening to issue lifetime bans to anyone criticising his style of management, and approaching Bray fans in an away fixture against Wexford Youths.

== Managerial statistics ==
As of match played 14 October 2022

| Team | From | To | Record | | | | |
| Team | From | To | G | W | D | L | Win % |
|---|---|---|---|---|---|---|---|
| (Republic of Ireland) Athlone Town | 1991 | 1992 | 33 | 6 | 11 | 16 | 18.18 |
| (Republic of Ireland) Drogheda United | 1992 | 1993 | 32 | 7 | 13 | 12 | 21.88 |
| (Republic of Ireland) Cabinteely | 2017 | 2021 | 127 | 49 | 22 | 56 | 38.58 |
| (Republic of Ireland) Bray Wanderers | 2022 | Present | 32 | 6 | 9 | 17 | 18.75 |

Note: Games included are league games only.
