= O'Neills =

Irish sporting goods manufacturer

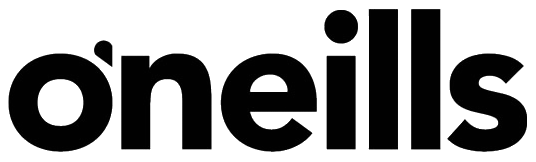
- Type: Private
- Industry: Textile
- Genre: Sportswear and sports equipment
- Founded: 1918; 108 years ago
- Founder: Charles O'Neill
- Headquarters: Dublin, Ireland
- Number of locations: List: Belfast; Strabane; London; Enniskillen; Cork; Dublin; Craigavon; Newry; Begley's Dungannon; Magherafelt; Castlecourt; Derry
- Area served: Global
- Products: Apparel; Footballs; Hurling sticks; Team uniforms
- Website: oneills.com

O'Neills Irish International Sports Company Ltd. is an Irish sporting goods manufacturer established in 1918. It is the largest manufacturer of sportswear in Ireland, with production plants located in Dublin and Strabane.

O'Neills has a long relationship with Irish rugby and association football and sports of Gaelic Athletic Association. The company currently supplies kits to 28 of the 32 inter-county teams in both Gaelic football and hurling; only Armagh GAA, Leitrim GAA, Waterford GAA and Westmeath GAA do not use O'Neills kits.

The O'Neills brand has been producing uniform kits, footballs and sliotars (hurling and shinty balls) for Gaelic games but is fast becoming a major supplier to rugby and association football clubs across Ireland, Britain, Europe and North America. O'Neills was the exclusive supplier to the Irish Provinces for many years and to the Irish international teams during their Triple Crown era.

== History ==
O'Neills Irish International Sports Company Ltd. was founded in 1918 by Charles O'Neill, when it primarily focused on the production of footballs and hurling balls from their factory at Capel Street, Dublin. By 1960, the brand had grown in size considerably and its popularity had grown, leading to its expansion into manufacturing playing kits for the GAA market. By 1974, the company had expanded their operations, and opened their first base in Northern Ireland at Strabane, followed by a company move from Capel Street to Walkinstown Avenue by 1984.

The Strabane plant employs around 500 staff, and is the main production facility for Gaelic football, rugby union, field hockey, and basketball apparel.

In 2010, the company launched their official online store with a further expansion of the online shopping element of the business taking place in 2013.

By 2022, O'Neills employs around 900 staff in key locations such as the Republic of Ireland, Northern Ireland (United Kingdom), Australia and the United States.
