= Cabinteely F.C. =

Football club in Dublin, Ireland

Coordinates: 53°17′20.8″N 6°9′40.2″W

Cabinteely
- Full name: Cabinteely Football Club
- Nickname: Cabo
- Founded: 1967
- Ground: Kilbogget Park (Cabinteely)
- Chairman: Dara Carroll
- League: DDSL; League of Ireland Underage National Leagues
- Website: https://cabinteelyfc.ie/
Home colours	Away colours

Cabinteely Football Club (Irish: Cumann Peile Cábán tSíle) is an association football club based in Cabinteely, County Dublin, Ireland comprising adult and many youth under-age teams for both males and females, 60 teams in all. Cabinteely competed in the League of Ireland First Division from 2015 to 2021 after being granted a licence by the Football Association of Ireland in January 2015. They made their debut in the League of Ireland First Division on 6 March 2015 and play their games at Stradbrook Road, the home of Blackrock College RFC.

The club, which was formed in 1967, fielded teams at every under-age level from under-8 to under-18 plus adult, taking part in several league and cup competitions such as those run by MGL, DDSL, LSL, and SDFL. Their senior men's team competes in the Leinster Senior League.

== History ==
=== Origin ===
Cabinteely changed their name several times. In the early 1930s, they were commonly known as "the Blues from Cabinteely". In 1939, they won the Schoolboys League Cup in front of an estimated crowd of 6,000. In the 1930s, Cabinteely's squad included Peter Farrell. The club's name was changed to Cabinteely Boys around 1950, and the current club was formed in 1967, as Auburn F.C., beginning league football with one team. In 1973, Auburn F.C. was changed to Cabinteely Boys F.C., with the name later changed to just Cabinteely F.C. to acknowledge both the female members associated with the club and the ladies teams.

=== League of Ireland ===
Chart of yearly table positions for Cabinteely in League of Ireland

Cabinteely were granted a licence to join the League of Ireland First Division in 2015. The club finished eighth (on 20 points) in the 2015 League of Ireland First Division; their debut season. Captain Viktor Ekanem won the club's Player of the Year award. In 2016, Cabinteely finished seventh, above Athlone Town. In 2017, Cabinteely achieved the highest number of points ever at 38, more than doubling the previous year's figure. They also progressed further than ever before in the FAI Cup and Leinster Senior Cup. In a first for the club, Kieran Marty Waters was voted PFAI First Division Player of the Year. In 2017, Cabinteely released a 5-year strategic plan where the club planned to provide new facilities in their home of Kilboget Park rather than Stradbrook. The plan proposed a new clubhouse, a second all-weather pitch and a stadium.

=== First team merger with Bray Wanderers ===
In November 2021, Cabinteely and Bray Wanderers announced a merger, technically a takeover of Wanderers by Cabinteely. The newly created first team would be known as Bray Wanderers and continue to play in the Carlisle Grounds, with the intention to apply for a First Division licence. Bray's former manager Pat Devlin and then Director of Football (DoF) at Cabinteely became the DoF for the new Bray Wanderers.

== Notable players ==
- Andy Keogh
- Alan O'Brien
- Stephanie Roche
- Jason Knight
