= 2021 Bohemian F.C. season =

Irish football club season

Bohemian F.C.
2021 season
- Manager: Keith Long
- Stadium: Dalymount Park, Phibsborough, Dublin 7
- Premier Division: 5th
- FAI Cup: Runners-up (vs. St Patrick's Athletic)
- UEFA Europa Conference League: Third qualifying round (vs. PAOK )
- Top goalscorer: League: Georgie Kelly (21 goals); All: Georgie Kelly (26 goals)
- Highest home attendance: 8,000 (vs. PAOK at Aviva Stadium) (vs. F91 Dudelange at Aviva Stadium)
- Lowest home attendance: 0
- Biggest win: Bohemians 5—0 Drogheda United (18 June 2021, Premier Division); College Corinthians 0—5 Bohemians (25 July 2021, FAI Cup)
- Biggest defeat: Sligo Rovers 4—0 Bohemians (26 June 2021)
Home colours	Away colours	Third colours

The 2021 League of Ireland season was Bohemian Football Club's 131st year in their history and their 37th consecutive season in the League of Ireland Premier Division since it became the top tier of Irish football. Bohemians participated in the FAI Cup, the national domestic cup competition, reaching their first final since 2008. Bohemians also competed in the inaugural UEFA Europa Conference League where they set a record for Irish clubs with four consecutive victories in European competition.

Prior to the commencement of the season, and despite no guarantees of live attendances due to the COVID-19 pandemic in the Republic of Ireland, Bohemians announced that they had a record 1,000 members signed up for the forthcoming campaign.

== Club ==
=== Kits ===
Supplier: O'Neills | Sponsor: Des Kelly Interiors

==== Home ====
The new home jersey for the 2021 season was released on 16 December 2020 and is made by O'Neills, now in their third year as the official kit manufacturer for Bohemians, and features Des Kelly Interiors as the main sponsor. The home kit is in the traditional colours of red and black and the design pays tribute to the Dalymount Park floodlights. The silhouette of the famous lights passes through the red stripes of the jersey, and the Miller & Stables plaque from the floodlight control room adorns bottom of the embroidery. The club's name in the crest is written in the Irish language for the second consecutive year. The slogan "Love Football, Hate Racism" also features at the back of the shirt.

==== Away ====
Bohemians teamed up with Dublin band Fontaines DC for their 2021 away kit, highlighting the issue of homelessness across the country. The jersey itself 'pays homage to Dublin and Ireland in its design' and features the ‘Dublin in the rain is mine’ Fontaines lyric from their song 'Big' as well as Patrick Pearse’s quote ‘Beware of the Risen People’ from the wall of Kilmainham Gaol. It also features imagery of Dublin landmarks Grattan Bridge and Poolbeg Chimneys. The jersey launch was covered by many publications worldwide, most notably Forbes Magazine.

==== Third ====
Bohs retained their blue and navy yellow-trimmed kit from the 2020 season as their alternative away attire. This kit includes commemorative inscriptions for the 130 year anniversary of the club, which was celebrated during the previous campaign.

=== Management team ===
Position	Name
Head coach	(Republic of Ireland) Keith Long
Assistant head coach	(Republic of Ireland) Trevor Croly
Goalkeeping coach	(Scotland) Chris Bennion
Head of fitness and conditioning	(England) Remy Tang
Strength and conditioning coach	(Republic of Ireland) Andrew Conroy
Performance coach	(Republic of Ireland) Philly McMahon
Physiotherapist	(Republic of Ireland) Dr Paul Kirwan
Academy transition coach	(Republic of Ireland) Derek Pender
Equipment manager	(Republic of Ireland) Colin O Connor
Assistant equipment manager	(Republic of Ireland) Aaron Fitzsimons

== Squad ==
No.	Player	Nat.	Pos.	Date of birth (age)	Since	Ends	Last club
Goalkeepers
1	James Talbot	(Republic of Ireland)	GK	24 April 1997 (age 29)	2019	2022	(England) Sunderland U23
25	Stephen McGuinness	(Republic of Ireland)	GK	10 March 1995 (age 31)	2020	2021	(Republic of Ireland) Cabinteely
29	Enda Minogue	(Republic of Ireland)	GK	12 January 2002 (age 24)	2021	2021	(Republic of Ireland) Bohemians U19
Defenders
2	Andy Lyons	(Republic of Ireland)	RB	2 August 2000 (age 26)	2018	2021	(Republic of Ireland) Bohemians U19
3	Anthony Breslin	(Republic of Ireland)	LB	13 February 1997 (age 29)	2020	2021	(Republic of Ireland) Longford Town
4	Rory Feely	(Republic of Ireland)	RB	3 January 1997 (age 29)	2021	2021	(Republic of Ireland) St Patrick's Athletic
5	Rob Cornwall	(Republic of Ireland)	CB	16 October 1994 (age 31)	2017	2021	(Republic of Ireland) Shamrock Rovers
6	Ciaran Kelly	(Republic of Ireland)	CB	4 July 1998 (age 28)	2020	2021	(Republic of Ireland) St Patrick's Athletic
18	James Finnerty	(Republic of Ireland)	CB	1 February 1999 (age 27)	2019	2021	(England) Rochdale
19	Tyreke Wilson	(Republic of Ireland)	LB	2 December 1999 (age 26)	2021	2021	(Republic of Ireland) Waterford
24	Gavin O Brien	(Republic of Ireland)	RB	30 January 2003 (age 23)	2021	2021	(Republic of Ireland) Bohemians U19
27	Seán Grehan	(Republic of Ireland)	CB	8 January 2004 (age 22)	2021	2021	(Republic of Ireland) Bohemians U19
Midfielders
7	Stephen Mallon	(Northern Ireland)	LM	7 February 1999 (age 27)	2021	2021	(England) Sheffield United
8	Ali Coote	(Scotland)	RM	11 June 1998 (age 28)	2021	2022	(Republic of Ireland) Waterford
10	Keith Ward	(Republic of Ireland)	AM	12 October 1990 (age 35)	2017	2021	(Republic of Ireland) Derry City
11	Liam Burt	(Scotland)	LM	1 February 1999 (age 27)	2021	2021	(Scotland) Celtic
14	Conor Levingston	(Republic of Ireland)	CM	21 January 1998 (age 28)	2019	2021	(England) Wolverhampton Wanderers U23
15	Roland Idowu	(Republic of Ireland)	AM	21 January 2002 (age 24)	2021	2022	(England) Cardiff City
16	Keith Buckley (C)	(Republic of Ireland)	CM	17 June 1992 (age 34)	2018	2021	(Republic of Ireland) Bray Wanderers
17	Aaron Doran	(Republic of Ireland)	CM	23 May 2003 (age 23)	2021	2021	(Republic of Ireland) Bohemians U19
20	Promise Omochere	(Republic of Ireland)	RM	18 October 2000 (age 25)	2019	2021	(Republic of Ireland) Bohemians U19
22	Jamie Mullins	(Republic of Ireland)	AM	29 September 2004 (age 21)	2021	2021	(Republic of Ireland) Bohemians U19
26	Ross Tierney	(Republic of Ireland)	AM	6 March 2001 (age 25)	2019	2021	(Republic of Ireland) Bohemians U19
28	Dawson Devoy	(Republic of Ireland)	CM	20 November 2001 (age 24)	2019	2021	(Republic of Ireland) Bohemians U19
30	Robbie Mahon	(Republic of Ireland)	RM	6 June 2003 (age 23)	2020	2021	(Republic of Ireland) Bohemians U19
Forwards
9	Cole Kiernan	(Republic of Ireland)	CF	3 January 2002 (age 24)	2021	2021	(England) Middlesbrough
12	Georgie Kelly	(Republic of Ireland)	CF	12 November 1996 (age 29)	2021	2021	(Republic of Ireland) Dundalk
Players left club during season
9	Bradley Rolt	(England)	FW	11 April 2003 (age 23)	2021	2021	(England) Peterborough United
17	Thomas Oluwa	(Republic of Ireland)	FW	8 February 2001 (age 25)	2021	2021	(Republic of Ireland) Shamrock Rovers
21	Bastien Héry †	(Madagascar)	CM	23 April 1992 (age 34)	2021	2021	(Northern Ireland) Linfield
23	Jack Moylan †	(Republic of Ireland)	AM	1 September 2001 (age 25)	2021	2021	(Republic of Ireland) Bohemians U19

† Player out on loan

== Friendlies ==
=== Pre-season ===
21 February 2021 Friendly	Bohemians	2–0	Shelbourne	Cloughran, Dublin
11:00 GMT	Thomas Oluwa 12'; Liam Burt 35'	Report		Stadium: AUL Complex

26 February 2021 Friendly	Dundalk	2–1	Bohemians	Dundalk
12:00 GMT	David McMillan 53'; Junior Ogedi-Uzokwe 75'	Report	Liam Burt 33'	Stadium: Oriel Park

26 February 2021 Friendly	UCD	0–2	Bohemians	Abbotstown, Dublin
19:45GMT		Report	Georgie Kelly 57' (pen.); Brad Rolt 64'	Stadium: National Sports Campus

5 March 2021 Friendly	Bohemians	2–1	Bray Wanderers	Cloughran, Dublin
19:30 GMT	Jack Moylan 1'; Thomas Oluwa 84'	Report	Ryan Graydon 53'	Stadium: AUL Complex

6 March 2021 Friendly	Bohemians	0–0	Derry City	Cloughran, Dublin
15:00 GMT		Report		Stadium: AUL Complex

12 March 2021 Friendly	Galway United	1–2	Bohemians	Galway
19:45 GMT	Mickey Place 90'	Report	Liam Burt 67'; Thomas Oluwa 69'	Stadium: Eamonn Deacy Park

13 March 2021 Friendly	Bohemians	6–0	Cobh Ramblers	Cloughran, Dublin
14:30GMT	Keith Ward; Ross Tierney; Jack Moylan; Jamie Mullins; Aaron Doran	Report		Stadium: AUL Complex

=== Mid-season ===
4 September 2021 Friendly	Ballymena United	2-4	Bohemians	Ballymena
15:00GMT	A Trialist 3'; Lee Chapman 7'	Report	Conor Levingston 14'; Promise Omochere 25'; Keith Ward 43' 65'	Stadium: Ballymena Showgrounds; Attendance: 480

== Competitions ==
=== Overview ===
Competition	Record							
Competition	P	W	D	L	GF	GA	GD	Win %
Premier Division	36	14	10	12	61	47	+14	38.89
FAI Cup	4	3	1	0	12	2	+10	75.00
Conference League	6	4	1	1	10	4	+6	66.67
Total	46	21	12	13	82	52	+30	45.65

Updated to match played 28 November 2021
Source: Competitions

=== League of Ireland ===
==== League table ====
Pos	Team	Pld	W	D	L	GF	GA	GD	Pts	Qualification or relegation
1	Shamrock Rovers (C)	36	24	6	6	59	28	+31	78	Qualification for Champions League first qualifying round
2	St Patrick's Athletic	36	18	8	10	56	42	+14	62	Qualification for Europa Conference League second qualifying round (Note: Since the winners of the 2021 FAI Cup (St Patrick's Athletic) qualified for European competition based on their league position, the final spot awarded to the Cup winner passed to the next best-placed team, i.e. fourth-placed team.)
3	Sligo Rovers	36	16	9	11	43	32	+11	57	Qualification for Europa Conference League first qualifying round
4	Derry City	36	14	12	10	49	42	+7	54	Qualification for Europa Conference League first qualifying round
5	Bohemians	36	14	10	12	60	46	+14	52	
6	Dundalk	36	13	9	14	44	46	−2	48	
7	Drogheda United	36	12	8	16	45	43	+2	44	
8	Finn Harps	36	11	11	14	44	52	−8	44	
9	Waterford (R)	36	12	6	18	36	56	−20	42	Qualification for relegation play-offs
10	Longford Town (R)	36	2	9	25	22	71	−49	15	Relegation to League of Ireland First Division

Source: SSE Airtricity League, Soccerway
Rules for classification: 1) Points; 2) Goal difference; 3) Goals scored.
(C) Champions; (R) Relegated

==== Results summary ====
Overall								Home						Away					
Pld	W	D	L	GF	GA	GD	Pts	W	D	L	GF	GA	GD	W	D	L	GF	GA	GD
36	14	10	12	60	46	+14	52	9	4	5	38	22	+16	5	6	7	22	24	−2

==== Results by matchday ====
Matchday	1	2	3	4	5	6	7	8	9	10	11	12	13	14	15	16	17	18	19	20	21	22	23	24	25	26	27	28	29	30	31	32	33	34	35	36
Ground	A	H	H	A	A	H	A	H	A	H	H	A	H	H	A	H	H	A	H	H	A	H	A	A	H	H	A	A	H	A	H	A	A	H	H	A
Result	L	D	L	W	W	L	L	L	D	W	W	L	W	W	D	W	W	L	W	D	L	W	L	W	D	L	L	W	D	D	L	D	D	W	W	D
Position	8	7	9	6	6	6	6	8	7	6	6	6	6	5	5	5	4	4	4	4	4	4	6	5	5	5	5	5	5	5	5	5	5	4	4	5

A = Away; H = Home; W = Win; D = Draw; L = Loss

==== Matches ====
Win Draw Loss

20 March 2021 Round 1	Finn Harps	1–0	Bohemians	Ballybofey
18:00 GMT	Kosovar Sadiki (yellow card) 26'; Adam Foley 34'; Karl O'Sullivan (yellow card) 44'; Sean Boyd (yellow card) 82'; Ethan Boyle (yellow card) 87'	Report		Stadium: Finn Park; Attendance: N/A; Referee: Paul McLaughlin

27 March 2021 Round 2	Bohemians	2–2	Longford Town	Phibsborough, Dublin
16:00 GMT	Georgie Kelly 20'; Ross Tierney 26'; Rory Feely (yellow card) 45'; Keith Buckley (yellow card) 57'; Rob Cornwall (yellow card) 90'	Report	Conor Davies 76', 86'	Stadium: Dalymount Park; Attendance: N/A; Referee: Ben Connolly

3 April 2021 Round 3	Bohemians	0–1	St Patrick's Athletic	Phibsborough, Dublin
18:00 IST	Anthony Breslin (yellow card) 54'; Georgie Kelly (yellow card) 87'	Report	Sam Bone (yellow card) 57'; Ronan Coughlan 62'	Stadium: Dalymount Park; Attendance: N/A; Referee: Neil Doyle

9 April 2021 Round 4	Dundalk	0–1	Bohemians	Dundalk
19:45 IST	Patrick Hoban (yellow card) 11'; Daniel Cleary (yellow card) 49'; Junior Ogedi-Uzokwe (yellow card) 85'; Darragh Leahy (yellow card) 89'	Report	James Finnerty (yellow card) 3'; Georgie Kelly 12' (pen.); Tyreke Wilson (yellow card) 78'	Stadium: Oriel Park; Attendance: N/A; Referee: Rob Harvey

16 April 2021 Round 5	Waterford	0–1	Bohemians	Waterford
17:45 IST	Adam O'Reilly (yellow card) 21'; Isaac Tshipamba (yellow card) 25'	Report	Rob Cornwall 43'	Stadium: Regional Sports Centre; Attendance: N/A; Referee: Adriano Reale

20 April 2021 Round 6	Bohemians	1–3	Sligo Rovers	Phibsborough, Dublin
19:45 IST	Liam Burt 47'	Report	Robbie McCourt (yellow card) 15'; Jordan Gibson 47'; Colm Horgan (yellow card) 55'; Greg Bolger (yellow card) 65'; Mark Byrne 76'; David Cawley 86'; Johnny Kenny (yellow card) 90'	Stadium: Dalymount Park; Attendance: N/A; Referee: Ben Connolly

23 April 2021 Round 7	Shamrock Rovers	2–1	Bohemians	Tallaght, Dublin
20:00 IST	Dylan Watts 5'; Sean Gannon (yellow card) 53'; Ronan Finn (yellow card) 61'; Graham Burke 76' (pen.); Sean Hoare (yellow card) 83'	Report	Ross Tierney 20'; Ali Coote (yellow card) 71'; James Finnerty (red card) 75'; Keith Buckley (yellow card) 92'	Stadium: Tallaght Stadium; Attendance: N/A; Referee: Paul McLaughlin

30 April 2021 Round 8	Bohemians	1–2	Derry City	Phibsborough, Dublin
19:45 IST	Georgie Kelly 17' (pen.)	Report	David Parkhouse (yellow card) 12'; Jack Malone (yellow card) 19'; Daniel Lafferty (yellow card) 53'; Cameron McJannet 63', 89'	Stadium: Dalymount Park; Attendance: N/A; Referee: Ben Connolly

3 May 2021 Round 9	Drogheda United	1–1	Bohemians	Drogheda
14:00 IST	Georgie Kelly (yellow card) 30'; Ross Tierney (yellow card) 45'; Liam Burt 60'	Report	James Clarke 93'	Stadium: United Park; Attendance: N/A; Referee: John McLoughlin

8 May 2021 Round 10	Bohemians	4–0	Finn Harps	Phibsborough, Dublin
18:00 IST	Ross Tierney 14'; Ali Coote 20', 45'; Keith Buckley (yellow card) 90', (goal) 93'	Report	Kosovar Sadiki (yellow card) 17'; Tunde Owolabi (yellow card) 27'; Sean Boyd (yellow card) 52'; Ethan Boyle (yellow card) 60'; Adam Foley (yellow card) 90'	Stadium: Dalymount Park; Attendance: N/A; Referee: Ray Matthews

15 May 2021 Round 11	Longford Town	0–2	Bohemians	Longford
18:00 IST	Paddy Kirk (yellow card) 88'; Sam Verdon (yellow card) 90'	Report	Rob Cornwall (yellow card) 25'; Liam Burt 29'; Dawson Devoy (yellow card) 70'; Ali Coote 74'	Stadium: Bishopsgate; Attendance: N/A; Referee: Adriano Reale

21 May 2021 Round 12	St Patrick's Athletic	2–1	Bohemians	Inchicore, Dublin
17:45 IST	Ian Bermingham (yellow card) 8'; Sam Bone (yellow card) 60'; Matty Smith 74'; Jamie Lennon (yellow card) 83'; Billy King (yellow card) 85'; John Mountney (yellow card) 89'; Ben McCormack (yellow card) 89'; Paddy Barrett (yellow card) 89'; Robbie Benson 90+2' (pen.)	Report	Ali Coote (yellow card) 59'; Rob Cornwall (yellow card) 72'; Liam Burt (yellow card) 83'; Dawson Devoy 90' (pen.)	Stadium: Richmond Park; Attendance: N/A; Referee: Rob Hennessy

24 May 2021 Round 13	Bohemians	5–1	Dundalk	Phibsborough, Dublin
17:45 IST	Georgie Kelly 5', 50', 64'; Tyreke Wilson 9' (yellow card) 40' (yellow-red card) 51'; Ali Coote (yellow card) 11'; Promise Omochere 93'	Report	Michael Duffy (yellow card) 11'; Cameron Dummigan (yellow card) 12' (yellow-red card) 74'; Greg Sloggett 80'; Chris Shields (yellow card) 88'	Stadium: Dalymount Park; Attendance: N/A; Referee: Ben Connolly

29 May 2021 Round 14	Bohemians	3–0	Waterford	Phibsborough, Dublin
16:00 IST	Dawson Devoy 37'; Ross Tierney 40'; Andy Lyons 70'	Report	Darragh Power (yellow card) 23'; John Martin (yellow card) 25'; Josh Collins (yellow card) 39'; Cian Kavanagh (yellow card) 51'; Isaac Tshipamba (red card) 66'; Adam O'Reilly (yellow card) 90'	Stadium: Dalymount Park; Attendance: N/A; Referee: Graham Kelly

11 June 2021 Round 15	Derry City	1–1	Bohemians	Derry
19:45 IST	Marc Walsh 92'; William Fitzgerald (yellow card) 69'	Report	Ali Coote 83' (yellow card) 71'; Anthony Breslin (yellow card) 86'	Stadium: Ryan McBride Brandywell Stadium; Attendance: 155; Referee: Robert Harvey

18 June 2021 Round 16	Bohemians	5–0	Drogheda United	Phibsborough, Dublin
19:45 IST	Georgie Kelly 9', 33', 53', 72'; Liam Burt 46'; Tyreke Wilson (yellow card) 90'	Report	Conor Kane (yellow card) 17'; Jake Hyland (yellow card) 29'	Stadium: Dalymount Park; Attendance: 100; Referee: Ben Connolly

21 June 2021 Round 17	Bohemians	1–0	Shamrock Rovers	Phibsborough, Dublin
19:45 IST	Georgie Kelly 56'	Report	Lee Grace (yellow card) 13'; Chris McCann (yellow card) 26'; Seán Hoare (yellow card) 40'	Stadium: Dalymount Park; Attendance: 100; Referee: Neil Doyle

26 June 2021 Round 18	Sligo Rovers	4–0	Bohemians	Sligo
19:45 IST	Johnny Kenny 13', 22', 80'; Ryan De Vries 53'	Report		Stadium: The Showgrounds; Attendance: 100; Referee: Damien MacGraith

2 July 2021 Round 19	Bohemians	3–2	St Patrick's Athletic	Phibsborough, Dublin
19:45 IST	Georgie Kelly 44'; Tyreke Wilson 73'; Liam Burt 81'	Report	Rory Feely 54' (o.g.); Jason McClelland 92'; Sam Bone (yellow card) 13'; Billy King (yellow card) 17'; Lee Desmond (yellow card) 41' (yellow-red card) 75'; Ian Bermingham (yellow card) 79' (yellow-red card) 85'	Stadium: Dalymount Park; Attendance: 100; Referee: Rob Hennessy

9 July 2021 Postponed	Dundalk	P–P	Bohemians	Dundalk
19:45 IST				Stadium: Oriel Park
Note: Postponed due to Bohemians' and Dundalks' involvement in Europa Conference League.

18 July 2021 Round 20	Bohemians	1–1	Longford Town	Phibsborough, Dublin
16:00 IST	Jamie Mullins 55'; Rory Feely (yellow card) 12'; Andy Lyons (yellow card) 67'	Report	Rob Manley 39'; Aodh Dervin (yellow card) 32'; Dean Williams (yellow card) 44'; Shane Elworthy (yellow card) 45'; Joseph Manley (yellow card) 62'; Aaron O’Driscoll (yellow card) 80'	Stadium: Dalymount Park; Attendance: 100; Referee: Neil Doyle

7 August 2021 Round 21	Waterford	1–0	Bohemians	Waterford
14:00 IST	Phoenix Patterson 42'; Jack Stafford (yellow card) 40'; John Martin (yellow card) 76'	Report	Ali Coote (yellow card) 20'; Rory Feely (yellow card) 33'; Keith Ward (yellow card) 54'	Stadium: Regional Sports Centre; Attendance: 200; Referee: Graham Kelly

15 August 2021 Round 22	Bohemians	1–0	Sligo Rovers	Phibsborough, Dublin
15:00 IST	Keith Buckley 64', (yellow card) 69'	Report	Regan Donelon (yellow card) 38'; Jordan Gibson (yellow card) 71'; Colm Horgan (yellow card) 83'	Stadium: Dalymount Park; Attendance: 400; Referee: Paul McLoughlin

20 August 2021 Postponed	Shamrock Rovers	P–P	Bohemians	Tallaght, Dublin
20:00 IST				Stadium: Tallaght Stadium
Note: Postponed due to Shamrock Rovers' involvement in Europa Conference League.

3 September 2021 Postponed	Bohemians	P–P	Derry City	Phibsborough, Dublin
19:45 IST				Stadium: Dalymount Park
Note: Postponed as a result of call-ups for Republic of Ireland U21

10 September 2021 Round 23	Drogheda United	3–2	Bohemians	Drogheda
19:45 IST	Mark Doyle 12' (pen.); Joe Redmond 23'; Jordan Adeyemo 39'; Darragh Markey (yellow card) 40'; Ronan Murray (yellow card) 54'	Report	Liam Burt 23'; Georgie Kelly 88' (pen.); Ciaran Kelly (yellow card) 39'; Ali Coote (yellow card) 44'	Stadium: United Park; Attendance: 1500; Referee: Graham Kelly

13 September 2021 Round 24	Finn Harps	1–2	Bohemians	Ballybofey
20:00 IST	Ryan Rainey 23'; David Webster (yellow card) 44'; Karl O'Sullivan (yellow card) 90'	Report	Promise Omochere 32' (yellow card) 72'; Georgie Kelly 42' (pen.); Ross Tierney (yellow card) 86'; Anthony Breslin (yellow card) 88'	Stadium: Finn Park; Attendance: 750; Referee: Paul McLaughlin
Note: Rescheduled fixture from 2 August

20 September 2021 Round 25	Bohemians	3–3	Derry City	Phibsborough, Dublin
19:45 IST	Liam Burt 7'; Rob Cornwall (yellow card) 75'; Georgie Kelly 80', 90+6'; Rory Feely (yellow card) 90+4'	Report	Jamie McGonigle 63'; Junior Ogedi-Uzokwe (yellow card) 66', (goal) 76'; Evan McLaughlin (yellow card) 79'; Darren Cole (yellow card) 85'; James Akintunde 90+1'	Stadium: Dalymount Park; Attendance: 2000; Referee: Rob Harvey
Note: Rescheduled fixture from 3 September 2021.

24 September 2021 Round 26	Bohemians	1–2	Finn Harps	Phibsborough, Dublin
19:45 IST	Liam Burt 90+2'; Ciaran Kelly (yellow card) 58'	Report	Sean Boyd (yellow card) 32'; Ryan Connolly (yellow card) 39'; Jordan Mustoe (yellow card) 45+1'; Ethan Boyle 56' (yellow card) 86'; Dan Hawkins 81'; (yellow card) 90+1'	Stadium: Dalymount Park; Attendance: 2000; Referee: Ray Matthews

27 September 2021 Round 27	Dundalk	2–1	Bohemians	Dundalk
19:45 IST	Greg Sloggett 45' (yellow card) 49'; Patrick Hoban 59'	Report	Rory Feely (yellow card) 28'; Tyreke Wilson 71'; Liam Burt (yellow card) 90+1'	Stadium: Oriel Park; Referee: Neil Doyle
Note: Rescheduled fixture from 9 July 2021.

2 October 2021 Round 28	Longford Town	1–4	Bohemians	Longford
19:30 IST	Dean Williams 37'; Ben Lynch (yellow card) 66'	Report	Georgie Kelly 47' (pen.), 79'; Tyreke Wilson 54'; (yellow card) 82'; Jamie Mullins 88'	Stadium: Bishopsgate; Attendance: 1500; Referee: Ben Connolly

8 October 2021 Postponed	St Patrick's Athletic	P–P	Bohemians	Inchicore, Dublin
19:45 IST				Stadium: Richmond Park
Note: Postponed as a result of call-ups for Republic of Ireland U21

15 October 2021 Round 29	Bohemians	1-1	Dundalk	Phibsborough, Dublin
19:45 IST	Georgie Kelly 90' (pen.); Anthony Breslin (yellow card) 40'; James Talbot (yellow card) 60'; Rob Cornwall (yellow card) 80'; Roland Idowu (yellow card) 90'	Report	Sami Ben Amar 28' (yellow card) 50'; Daniel Cleary (yellow card) 32'; Will Patching (yellow card) 32'	Stadium: Dalymount Park; Attendance: 2000; Referee: Damien MacGraith

18 October 2021 Round 30	Shamrock Rovers	1-1	Bohemians	Tallaght, Dublin
19:15 IST	Richie Towell 69'; Roberto Lopes (red card) 44'; Chris McCann (yellow card) 78'; Ronan Finn (yellow card) 90'		Liam Burt 38'; Dawson Devoy (yellow card) 90'	Stadium: Tallaght Stadium; Attendance: 4000; Referee: Neil Doyle
Note: Rescheduled fixture from 20 August 2021. Game shown live on RTE2.

25 October 2021 Round 31	Bohemians	1-2	Waterford	Phibsborough, Dublin
19:45 IST	Georgie Kelly 41' (yellow card) 55'; Conor Levingston (yellow card) 28'	Report	John Martin 49'; Anthony Wordsworth 65'; Jack Stafford (yellow card) 12'; Cameron Evans (yellow card) 61'; Callum Stringer (yellow card) 87'; Phoenix Patterson (yellow card) 90'	Stadium: Dalymount Park; Attendance: 2,000; Referee: Rob Hennessy

29 October 2021 Round 32	Derry City	1-1	Bohemians	Derry
19:45 IST	Ronan Boyce 90+3'; Ciaran Harkin (yellow card) 59'	Report	Promise Omochere 49'; Tyreke Wilson (yellow card) 70'; Rory Feely (yellow card) 89'; Dawson Devoy (yellow card) 90'	Stadium: Ryan McBride Brandywell Stadium; Attendance: 3000; Referee: Damien MacGraith

1 November 2021 Round 33	St Patrick's Athletic	2-2	Bohemians	Inchicore, Dublin
19:45 IST	Billy King 12'; Jason McClelland 48'; Nahum Melvin-Lambert (yellow card) 68'; Paddy Barrett (yellow card) 69'; Jak Hickman (yellow card) 82'; Darragh Burns (yellow card) 85'; James Abankwah (yellow card) 90+4'; Robbie Benson (yellow card) 90+5'	Report	Ross Tierney 54' (yellow card) 60'; Promise Omochere 64' (yellow card) 83'; Anthony Breslin (yellow card) 36'; James Finnerty (yellow card) 71'; Ali Coote (yellow card) 87'	Stadium: Richmond Park; Attendance: 3,700; Referee: Rob Harvey

5 November 2021 Round 34	Bohemians	2-0	Drogheda United	Phibsborough, Dublin
19:45 GMT	Ross Tierney 48' 76'		Dinny Corcoran 28'; James Brown (yellow card) 71'	Stadium: Dalymount Park; Attendance: 2800; Referee: Damien MacGraith

12 November 2021 Round 35	Bohemians	3-1	Shamrock Rovers	Phibsborough, Dublin
19:45 GMT	Lee Grace 30' (o.g.); Promise Omochere 41'; Rob Cornwall 44'	Report	Daniel Mandroiu 38' (yellow card) 38'; Joey O'Brien (yellow card) 38'; Max Murphy (yellow card) 89'	Stadium: Dalymount Park; Attendance: 3600; Referee: Paul McLaughlin

19 November 2021 Round 36	Sligo Rovers	1–1	Bohemians	Sligo
19:45 GMT	Johnny Kenny 16'; Greg Bolger (yellow card) 33'; John Mahon (yellow card) 38'; Adam McDonnell (yellow card) 42'; Robbie McCourt (yellow card) 61'		Georgie Kelly 78'	Stadium: The Showgrounds; Referee: Graham Kelly

=== FAI Cup ===
25 July First round	College Corinthians	0–5	Bohemians	Cork
15:00 IST		Report	Keith Buckley 4'; Aaron Doran 26'; Keith Ward 58' (pen.); Jamie Mullins 79'; Dawson Devoy 90'	Stadium: Turners Cross; Attendance: 440; Referee: Ray Matthews

29 August Second round	Bohemians	2–1	Shamrock Rovers	Phibsborough, Dublin
16:00 IST	Anthony Breslin (yellow card) 50'; Ali Coote 55'; Rob Cornwall (yellow card) 65'; Georgie Kelly (red card) 80'; Andy Lyons 86'	Report	Gary O'Neill (yellow card) 45'; Chris McCann (yellow card) 47'; Ronan Finn (yellow card) 54' (yellow-red card) 80'; Roberto Lopes 78'	Stadium: Dalymount Park; Attendance: 800; Referee: Neil Doyle

17 September Quarter-final	Bohemians	4–0	Maynooth University Town	Phibsborough, Dublin
19:45 IST	Keith Buckley 17'; Conor Levingston 34'; Keith Ward 36'; Roland Idowu 61'	Report	Conor Dunne (yellow card) 29'; Alex Kelly (red card) 32'	Stadium: Dalymount Park; Attendance: 2000; Referee: Adriano Reale

22 October 2021 Semi-final	Bohemians	1–0	Waterford	Phibsborough, Dublin
19:45 IST	Dawson Devoy (yellow card) 35'; Georgie Kelly 88'	Report	Niall O'Keeffe (yellow card) 30' (yellow-red card) 90'; Kyle Ferguson (yellow card) 41' (yellow-red card) 53'; Prince Mutswunguma (yellow card) 76'	Stadium: Dalymount Park; Attendance: 3500; Referee: Rob Harvey

28 November 2021 Final	St Patrick's Athletic	1–1 (a.e.t.) (4–3 p)	Bohemians	Ballsbridge, Dublin
16:00 IST	Darragh Burns (yellow card) 37'; Lee Desmond (yellow card) 100'; Chris Forrester 105+2'	Report	Keith Buckley (yellow card) 90'; Rory Feely 107'	Stadium: Aviva Stadium; Attendance: 37,126; Referee: Rob Hennessy
	Penalties
	Ronan Coughlan (penalty scored); Billy King (penalty scored); Chris Forrester (penalty missed); Jason McClelland (penalty scored); Robbie Benson (penalty scored)		Dawson Devoy (penalty scored); Conor Levingston (penalty scored); Stephen Mallon (penalty scored); Tyreke Wilson (penalty missed); Keith Ward (penalty missed)

=== UEFA Europa Conference League ===
8 July First qualifying round	Stjarnan (Iceland)	1–1	(Republic of Ireland) Bohemians	Garðabær, Iceland
20:45 GMT	Emil Atlason 25'; Heidar Aegisson (yellow card) 54'; Einar Ingvarsson (yellow card) 61'	Report	Ross Tierney 63'	Stadium: Stjörnuvöllur; Attendance: 720; Referee: Sandi Putros (Denmark)

15 July First qualifying round	Bohemians (Republic of Ireland)	3–0	(Iceland) Stjarnan	Dublin
19:45 GMT	Rory Feely (yellow card) 23'; Georgie Kelly 34', 54'; Liam Burt 75'; Andy Lyons (yellow card) 86'	Report		Stadium: Aviva Stadium; Attendance: 6,000; Referee: Jason Barcelo (Gibraltar)

22 July Second qualifying round	F91 Dudelange (Luxembourg)	0–1	(Republic of Ireland) Bohemians	Dudelange, Luxembourg
17:30 GMT	Ricardo Delgado (yellow card) 24'; Mehdi Kirch (yellow card) 37'; Jules Diouf (yellow card) 58'; Mohcine Hassan Nader (yellow card) 68'; Edvin Muratovic (yellow card) 82'; Charles Morren (yellow card) 90'	Report	Ross Tierney 11'; Dawson Devoy (yellow card) 73'; James Finnerty (yellow card) 88'	Stadium: Stade Jos Nosbaum; Attendance: 635; Referee: Nejc Kajtazovic (Slovenia)

29 July Second qualifying round	Bohemians (Republic of Ireland)	3–0	(Luxembourg) F91 Dudelange	Dublin
19:45 GMT	Rob Cornwall 34'; Keith Buckley (yellow card) 48'; Georgie Kelly 69', 73', (yellow card) 69'	Report	Charles Morren (yellow card) 26'; Jules Diouf (yellow card) 42'; Nélito Dos Santos Da Cruz (yellow card) 51'	Stadium: Aviva Stadium; Attendance: 8,000; Referee: Gergoe Bogár (Hungary)

3 August Third qualifying round	Bohemians (Republic of Ireland)	2–1	(Greece) PAOK	Dublin
19:45 GMT	Ali Coote 23', 52'; Anthony Breslin (yellow card) 66'; James Talbot (yellow card) 70'	Report	Nelson Oliveira (yellow card) 62', (goal) 78'; Christos Tzolis (yellow card) 78'; Jasmin Kurtić (yellow card) 90+1'; Diego Biseswar (yellow card) 90+6'	Stadium: Aviva Stadium; Attendance: 8,000; Referee: Antti Munukka (Finland)

12 August Third qualifying round	PAOK (Greece)	2–0	(Republic of Ireland) Bohemians	Thessaloniki, Greece
18:00 GMT	Stefan Schwab 4'; Diego Biseswar 28'; Omar El Kaddouri (yellow card) 75'; Thomas Murg (yellow card) 87'; Anderson Esiti (yellow card) 90+7'	Report	Keith Buckley (yellow card) 90+2'; Rob Cornwall (yellow card) 90+4'	Stadium: Toumba Stadium; Attendance: 10,000; Referee: Julian Weinberger (Austria)

== Statistics ==
=== Appearances and goals ===
No.	Pos.	Player	Premier Division		FAI Cup		Europe		Total	
No.	Pos.	Player	Apps	Goals	Apps	Goals	Apps	Goals	Apps	Goals
1	GK	(Republic of Ireland) James Talbot	34	0	4	0	6	0	44	0
2	DF	(Republic of Ireland) Andy Lyons	25(6)	1	4	1	6	0	35(6)	2
3	DF	(Republic of Ireland) Anthony Breslin	22(3)	1	0	0	5(1)	0	28(4)	0
4	DF	(Republic of Ireland) Rory Feely	30(6)	0	5(3)	1	5(2)	0	40(11)	1
5	DF	(Republic of Ireland) Rob Cornwall	27(2)	3	2	0	5(1)	1	34(3)	4
6	DF	(Republic of Ireland) Ciaran Kelly	25(3)	0	4	0	4	0	33(4)	0
7	MF	(Northern Ireland) Stephen Mallon	5(5)	0	1(1)	0	1(1)	0	7(7)	0
8	MF	(Scotland) Ali Coote	32(5)	4	4(1)	1	6	2	42(6)	7
9	FW	(Republic of Ireland) Cole Kiernan	3(3)	0	1(1)	0	0	0	4(4)	0
10	MF	(Republic of Ireland) Keith Ward	31(20)	0	4(2)	2	4(4)	0	39(26)	2
11	MF	(Scotland) Liam Burt	34(1)	9	3	0	6	1	44(1)	10
12	FW	(Republic of Ireland) Georgie Kelly	31(2)	21	3	1	6	4	40(2)	26
14	MF	(Republic of Ireland) Conor Levingston	23(7)	0	4(2)	1	5(5)	0	32(13)	1
15	MF	(Republic of Ireland) Roland Idowu	5(5)	0	1(1)	1	0	0	6(6)	1
16	MF	(Republic of Ireland) Keith Buckley	29(7)	2	4	2	6	0	39(7)	4
17	DF	(Republic of Ireland) Aaron Doran	2(2)	0	1	1	0	0	3(2)	1
18	DF	(Republic of Ireland) James Finnerty	19(4)	0	3(2)	0	4(3)	0	26(9)	0
19	DF	(Republic of Ireland) Tyreke Wilson	24(1)	4	3	0	3(1)	0	30(2)	4
20	MF	(Republic of Ireland) Promise Omochere	18(10)	5	3(3)	0	0	0	21(13)	5
22	MF	(Republic of Ireland) Jamie Mullins	10(6)	2	2	1	1(1)	0	13(7)	3
24	DF	(Republic of Ireland) Gavin O'Brien	0	0	0	0	0	0	0	0
25	GK	(Republic of Ireland) Stephen McGuinness	2	0	1	0	0	0	3	0
26	MF	(Republic of Ireland) Ross Tierney	34(1)	7	3	0	6	2	43(1)	9
27	DF	(Republic of Ireland) Seán Grehan	0	0	1	0	0	0	1	0
28	MF	(Republic of Ireland) Dawson Devoy	34(6)	2	4(1)	1	6	0	44(7)	3
29	GK	(Republic of Ireland) Enda Minogue	0	0	0	0	0	0	0	0
30	FW	(Republic of Ireland) Robbie Mahon	3(2)	0	2(1)	0	0	0	5(3)	0
Players left club during season
9	FW	(England) Brad Rolt	0	0	0	0	0	0	0	0
17	FW	(Republic of Ireland) Thomas Oluwa	3 (3)	0	0	0	0	0	3 (3)	0
21	MF	(Madagascar) Bastien Héry †	5(4)	0	0	0	0	0	5(4)	0
23	MF	(Republic of Ireland) Jack Moylan †	4(3)	0	0	0	0	0	4(3)	0

† Player out on loan

Last updated: 28 November 2021.
Source: Competitions

=== Top Scorers ===
No.	Pos.	Player	Premier Division	FAI Cup	Europe	Total
12	FW	(Republic of Ireland) Georgie Kelly	21	1	4	26
11	MF	(Scotland) Liam Burt	9	0	1	10
26	MF	(Republic of Ireland) Ross Tierney	6	0	2	9
8	MF	(Scotland) Ali Coote	4	1	2	7
20	MF	(Republic of Ireland) Promise Omochere	5	0	0	5
16	MF	(Republic of Ireland) Keith Buckley	2	2	0	4
19	DF	(Republic of Ireland) Tyreke Wilson	4	0	0	4
5	DF	(Republic of Ireland) Rob Cornwall	3	0	1	4
28	MF	(Republic of Ireland) Dawson Devoy	2	1	0	3
22	MF	(Republic of Ireland) Jamie Mullins	2	1	0	3
2	DF	(Republic of Ireland) Andy Lyons	1	1	0	2
10	MF	(Republic of Ireland) Keith Ward	0	2	0	2
24	MF	(Republic of Ireland) Aaron Doran	0	1	0	1
14	MF	(Republic of Ireland) Conor Levingston	0	1	0	1
15	MF	(Republic of Ireland) Roland Idowu	0	1	0	1
4	DF	(Republic of Ireland) Rory Feely	0	1	0	1
-	-	Own Goal	1	0	0	1
Total			60	13	10	81

Last updated: 28 November 2021.
Source: Competitions

=== Hat tricks ===
Player	Against	Goals	Result	Date	Competition
(Republic of Ireland) Georgie Kelly	Dundalk	3	5–1 (H)	24 May 2021	Premier Division
(Republic of Ireland) Georgie Kelly	Drogheda United	4	5–0 (H)	18 June 2021	Premier Division

Last updated: 19 November 2021.
Source: Competitions

=== Clean Sheets ===
No.	Pos.	Player	Premier Division	FAI Cup	Europe	Total
1	GK	(Republic of Ireland) James Talbot	8/34	2/4	3/6	13/44
25	GK	(Republic of Ireland) Stephen McGuinness	0/2	1/1	0/0	1/3
29	GK	(Republic of Ireland) Enda Minogue	0/0	0/0	0/0	0/0
Total			8/36	3/5	3/6	14/47

Last updated: 28 November 2021.
Source: Competitions

=== Discipline ===
No.	Pos.	Player	Premier Division			FAI Cup			Europe			Total		
No.	Pos.	Player	Booked	(yellow card) (yellow-red card)	Sent off (straight red)	Booked	(yellow card) (yellow-red card)	Sent off (straight red)	Booked	(yellow card) (yellow-red card)	Sent off (straight red)	Booked	(yellow card) (yellow-red card)	Sent off (straight red)
1	GK	(Republic of Ireland) James Talbot	1	0	0	0	0	0	1	0	0	2	0	0
2	DF	(Republic of Ireland) Andy Lyons	1	0	0	0	0	0	1	0	0	2	0	0
3	DF	(Republic of Ireland) Anthony Breslin	3	0	0	1	0	0	1	0	0	5	0	0
4	DF	(Republic of Ireland) Rory Feely	7	0	0	0	0	0	1	0	0	8	0	0
5	DF	(Republic of Ireland) Rob Cornwall	6	0	0	1	0	0	1	0	0	8	0	0
6	DF	(Republic of Ireland) Ciaran Kelly	2	0	0	0	0	0	0	0	0	2	0	0
7	MF	(Northern Ireland) Stephen Mallon	0	0	0	0	0	0	0	0	0	0	0	0
8	MF	(Scotland) Ali Coote	7	0	0	0	0	0	0	0	0	7	0	0
9	FW	(Republic of Ireland) Cole Kiernan	0	0	0	0	0	0	0	0	0	0	0	0
10	MF	(Republic of Ireland) Keith Ward	1	0	0	0	0	0	0	0	0	1	0	0
11	FW	(Scotland) Liam Burt	2	0	0	0	0	0	0	0	0	2	0	0
12	FW	(Republic of Ireland) Georgie Kelly	3	0	0	0	0	1	1	0	0	4	0	1
14	MF	(Republic of Ireland) Conor Levingston	1	0	0	0	0	0	0	0	0	1	0	0
15	MF	(Republic of Ireland) Roland Idowu	1	0	0	0	0	0	0	0	0	1	0	0
16	MF	(Republic of Ireland) Keith Buckley	4	0	0	1	0	0	2	0	0	8	0	0
17	MF	(Republic of Ireland) Aaron Doran	0	0	0	0	0	0	0	0	0	0	0	0
18	DF	(Republic of Ireland) James Finnerty	3	0	1	0	0	0	1	0	0	4	0	1
19	DF	(Republic of Ireland) Tyreke Wilson	3	1	0	0	0	0	0	0	0	3	1	0
20	MF	(Republic of Ireland) Promise Omochere	1	0	0	0	0	0	0	0	0	1	0	0
22	MF	(Republic of Ireland) Jamie Mullins	0	0	0	0	0	0	0	0	0	0	0	0
24	DF	(Republic of Ireland) Gavin O'Brien	0	0	0	0	0	0	0	0	0	0	0	0
25	GK	(Republic of Ireland) Stephen McGuinness	0	0	0	0	0	0	0	0	0	0	0	0
26	MF	(Republic of Ireland) Ross Tierney	3	0	0	0	0	0	1	0	0	4	0	0
27	DF	(Republic of Ireland) Seán Grehan	0	0	0	0	0	0	0	0	0	0	0	0
28	MF	(Republic of Ireland) Dawson Devoy	3	0	0	1	0	0	1	0	0	5	0	0
29	GK	(Republic of Ireland) Enda Minogue	0	0	0	0	0	0	0	0	0	0	0	0
30	FW	(Republic of Ireland) Robbie Mahon	0	0	0	0	0	0	0	0	0	0	0	0
Players left club during season
9	FW	(England) Brad Rolt	0	0	0	0	0	0	0	0	0	0	0	0
17	FW	(Republic of Ireland) Thomas Oluwa	0	0	0	0	0	0	0	0	0	0	0	0
21	CM	(Madagascar) Bastien Héry †	0	0	0	0	0	0	0	0	0	0	0	0
23	MF	(Republic of Ireland) Jack Moylan †	0	0	0	0	0	0	0	0	0	0	0	0
Total			50	1	1	4	0	1	11	0	0	66	1	2

† Player out on loan

Last updated: 28 November 2021.
Source: Competitions

=== Captains ===
No.	Pos.	Player	No. Games	Notes
16	MF	(Republic of Ireland) Keith Buckley	34	Captain
5	DF	(Republic of Ireland) Rob Cornwall	7	Vice-Captain
3	DF	(Republic of Ireland) Anthony Breslin	3	
19	DF	(Republic of Ireland) Tyreke Wilson	1	
10	MF	(Republic of Ireland) Keith Ward	1	
1	GK	(Republic of Ireland) James Talbot	1	

Last updated: 28 November 2021
Source: Competitive match reports.
Competitive matches only
Matches started as captain only
Country: FIFA nationality; No.: Squad number; P: Position; Name: Player name; No. Games: Number of games started as captain.

== International call-ups ==
=== Republic of Ireland National Team ===
Player	Fixture	Date	Location	Event
James Talbot	vs. Portugal	1 September 2021	Faro, Portugal	2022 FIFA World Cup Qualifier
James Talbot	vs. Azerbaijan	4 September 2021	Dublin, Ireland	2022 FIFA World Cup Qualifier
James Talbot	vs. Serbia	7 September 2021	Dublin, Ireland	2022 FIFA World Cup Qualifier

=== Republic of Ireland Under 21 National Team ===
Player	Fixture	Date	Location	Event
Andy Lyons	vs. Wales	26 March 2021	Wrexham, Wales	Friendly
Andy Lyons	vs. Australia	2 June 2021	Marbella, Spain	Friendly
Andy Lyons	vs. Denmark	5 June 2021	Marbella, Spain	Friendly
Andy Lyons	vs. Bosnia and Herzegovina	3 September 2021	Zenica, Bosnia and Herzegovina	2023 UEFA European Under-21 Championship qualification
Andy Lyons	vs. Luxembourg	7 September 2021	Dudelange, Luxembourg	2023 UEFA European Under-21 Championship qualification
Andy Lyons	vs. Luxembourg	8 October 2021	Dublin, Ireland	2023 UEFA European Under-21 Championship qualification
Andy Lyons	vs. Italy	12 November 2021	Dublin, Ireland	2023 UEFA European Under-21 Championship qualification
Andy Lyons	vs. Sweden	16 October 2021	Dublin, Ireland	2023 UEFA European Under-21 Championship qualification
Dawson Devoy	vs. Wales	26 March 2021	Wrexham, Wales	Friendly
Dawson Devoy	vs. Australia	2 June 2021	Marbella, Spain	Friendly
Dawson Devoy	vs. Bosnia and Herzegovina	3 September 2021	Zenica, Bosnia and Herzegovina	2023 UEFA European Under-21 Championship qualification
Dawson Devoy	vs. Luxembourg	7 September 2021	Dudelange, Luxembourg	2023 UEFA European Under-21 Championship qualification
Dawson Devoy	vs. Luxembourg	8 October 2021	Dublin, Ireland	2023 UEFA European Under-21 Championship qualification
Dawson Devoy	vs. Italy	12 November 2021	Dublin, Ireland	2023 UEFA European Under-21 Championship qualification
Dawson Devoy	vs. Sweden	16 October 2021	Dublin, Ireland	2023 UEFA European Under-21 Championship qualification
Ross Tierney	vs. Australia	2 June 2021	Marbella, Spain	Friendly
Ross Tierney	vs. Denmark	5 June 2021	Marbella, Spain	Friendly
Ross Tierney	vs. Bosnia and Herzegovina	3 September 2021	Zenica, Bosnia and Herzegovina	2023 UEFA European Under-21 Championship qualification
Ross Tierney	vs. Luxembourg	7 September 2021	Dudelange, Luxembourg	2023 UEFA European Under-21 Championship qualification
Ross Tierney	vs. Luxembourg	8 October 2021	Dublin, Ireland	2023 UEFA European Under-21 Championship qualification
Ross Tierney	vs. Italy	12 November 2021	Dublin, Ireland	2023 UEFA European Under-21 Championship qualification
Ross Tierney	vs. Sweden	16 October 2021	Dublin, Ireland	2023 UEFA European Under-21 Championship qualification

=== Republic of Ireland Under 19 National Team ===
Player	Fixture	Date	Location	Event
Jamie Mullins	vs. Sweden	8 October 2021	Marbella, Spain	Friendly
Jamie Mullins	vs. Sweden	11 October 2021	Marbella, Spain	Friendly

== Awards ==
No.	Pos.	Player	Award	Source
12	FW	Georgie Kelly	League Of Ireland Player of the Month June	
28	MF	Dawson Devoy	League Of Ireland Player of the Month July	
8	MF	Ali Coote	League Of Ireland Player of the Month August	
12	FW	Georgie Kelly	League Of Ireland Player of the Month September	
28	MF	Dawson Devoy	Bohemian FC Young Player of the Year	
12	FW	Georgie Kelly	Bohemian FC Player of the Year	
12	FW	Georgie Kelly	League of Ireland Top Goal Scorer	
1	GK	James Talbot	PFAI Team of the Year	
11	MF	Liam Burt	PFAI Team of the Year	
12	FW	Georgie Kelly	PFAI Team of the Year	
28	MF	Dawson Devoy	PFAI Team of the Year	
12	FW	Georgie Kelly	PFAI Player of the Year	
28	MF	Dawson Devoy	PFAI Young Player of the Year	

== Transfers ==
=== In ===
No.	Pos.	Player	From	Date	Fee	Source
	LB	(Republic of Ireland) Tyreke Wilson	(Republic of Ireland) Waterford	1 January 2021	Free	
	CF	(Republic of Ireland) Georgie Kelly	(Republic of Ireland) Dundalk	1 January 2021	Free	
	CF	(Republic of Ireland) Thomas Oluwa	(Republic of Ireland) Shamrock Rovers	1 January 2021	Free	
	MF	(Scotland) Ali Coote	(Republic of Ireland) Waterford	1 January 2021	Free	
	RB	(Republic of Ireland) Rory Feely	(Republic of Ireland) St Patrick's Athletic	5 January 2021	Free	
	LW	(Northern Ireland) Stephen Mallon	(England) Sheffield United	12 January 2021	Free	
	CM	(Madagascar) Bastien Héry	(Northern Ireland) Linfield	16 January 2021	Free	
	AM	(Scotland) Liam Burt	(Scotland) Celtic	3 February 2021	Free	
	AM	(Republic of Ireland) Roland Idowu	(England) Cardiff City	30 August 2021	Free	
	FW	(Republic of Ireland) Cole Kiernan	(England) Middlesbrough	31 August 2021	Free	

=== Loan in ===
No.	Pos.	Player	From	Starts	Ends	Fee	Ref
Winter
	FW	(England) Brad Rolt	(England) Peterborough United	11 February 2021	30 June 2021	Undisclosed	

=== Out ===
Pos.	Player	To	Date	Fee	Source
Winter
RB	(Republic of Ireland) Michael Barker	(Republic of Ireland) Shelbourne	2 December 2020	N/A	
CF	(Republic of Ireland) Glen McAuley	(Republic of Ireland) Shelbourne	3 December 2020	N/A	
CM	(Republic of Ireland) Jonathan Lunney	(Republic of Ireland) Shelbourne	3 December 2020	N/A	
LB	(Republic of Ireland) Paddy Kirk	(Republic of Ireland) Longford Town	10 December 2020	N/A	
CF	(Republic of Ireland) Dinny Corcoran	(Republic of Ireland) Drogheda	10 December 2020	N/A	
AM	(Republic of Ireland) Danny Mandroiu	(Republic of Ireland) Shamrock Rovers	16 December 2020	N/A	
LW	(Republic of Ireland) Daniel Grant	(England) Huddersfield Town	19 December 2020	Undisclosed	
CF	(Republic of Ireland) Evan Ferguson	(England) Brighton & Hove Albion	9 January 2021	Undisclosed	
CB	(Republic of Ireland) Dan Casey	(United States) Sacramento Republic	13 January 2021	Free	
FW	(England) Andre Wright	(Scotland) Ayr United	24 January 2021	Free	
Summer
FW	(England) Brad Rolt	(England) Peterborough United	1 July 2021	Loan ended	
FW	(Republic of Ireland) Thomas Oluwa	(Republic of Ireland) Galway United	2 July 2021	Free	

=== Loan out ===
No.	Pos.	Player	To	Starts	Ends	Fee	Ref
Summer
	MF	(Republic of Ireland) Jack Moylan	(Republic of Ireland) Wexford	1 July 2021	31 December 2021	Undisclosed	
	MF	(Madagascar) Bastien Héry	(Republic of Ireland) Derry City	27 July 2021	31 December 2021	Undisclosed	
