= Enda Minogue =

Irish footballer (born 2002)

Personal information
- Full name: Enda Minogue
- Date of birth: 12 January 2002 (age 24)
- Place of birth: Knocklyon, County Dublin, Ireland
- Height: 1.91 m (6 ft 3 in)
- Position: Goalkeeper

Team information
- Current team: Dundalk
- Number: 1

Youth career
- Knocklyon United
- –2017: St Joseph's Boys
- 2017–2020: Bray Wanderers
- 2021–2022: Bohemians

Senior career*
Years	Team	Apps	(Gls)
2018–2020	Bray Wanderers	1	(0)
2021–2022	Bohemians	0	(0)
2022–2024	Athlone Town	63	(0)
2025–	Dundalk	48	(0)
- * Club domestic league appearances and goals as of 16:45, 10 November 2026 (UTC)

Enda Minogue (born 12 January 2002) is an Irish professional footballer who plays as a goalkeeper for League of Ireland Premier Division club Dundalk.

== Club career ==
=== Youth career ===
A native of Knocklyon, County Dublin, Minogue began playing with local club Knocklyon United, then played for St Joseph's Boys before coming through the academy at League of Ireland club Bray Wanderers.

=== Bray Wanderers ===
On 17 August 2018, Minogue made his senior debut for Bray Wanderers aged 16, after fellow goalkeeper Evan Moran picked up an injury in the warmup of an eventual 3–1 defeat to Dundalk at the Carlisle Grounds.

=== Bohemians ===
Minogue signed for Bohemians in January 2021 and remained there until the summer of 2022, playing for their academy as well as being an unused substitute in 2 league games and all 6 of their UEFA Europa Conference League fixtures in the summer of 2021.

=== Athlone Town ===
Midway through the 2022 season, Minogue signed for League of Ireland First Division club Athlone Town. In December 2022, Minogue signed a new contract with the club for the 2022 season. After keeping 6 clean sheets in 30 league appearances in his first full season with the club, it was announced on 15 December 2023 that Minogue had signed a new one-year-contract with the club.

=== Dundalk ===
On 8 December 2024, Minogue signed for recently relegated League of Ireland First Division club Dundalk. He made 18 league appearances in his first season with the club, as they won the 2025 League of Ireland First Division to gain promotion back to the Premier Division. On 26 October 2025, he came off the bench for a late cameo appearance as his side won the 2024–25 Leinster Senior Cup following a 2–1 win away to St Patrick's Athletic in the Final. On 18 December 2025, Minogue signed a new contract with the club. Having been left out of the side in the first 6 league games of the 2026 season, Minogue was made first choice keeper by manager Ciarán Kilduff following a season ending injury to newly signed loanee goalkeeper Conor Kearns.

== Career statistics ==
As of match played on 30 October 2026

Appearances and goals by club, season and competition
Club	Season	League			National Cup (Note: Includes FAI Cup)		League Cup (Note: Includes League of Ireland Cup)		Other		Total	
Club	Season	Division	Apps	Goals	Apps	Goals	Apps	Goals	Apps	Goals	Apps	Goals
Bray Wanderers	2018	LOI Premier Division	1	0	0	0	0	0	0 (Note: Appearance(s) in the Leinster Senior Cup)	0	1	0
Bray Wanderers	2019	LOI First Division	0	0	0	0	0	0	0	0	0	0
Bray Wanderers	2020	LOI First Division	0	0	0	0	0	0	0	0	0	0
Bray Wanderers	Total		1	0	0	0	0	0	0	0	1	0
Bohemians	2021	LOI Premier Division	0	0	0	0	–		0	0	0	0
Bohemians	2022	LOI Premier Division	0	0	0	0	–		0	0	0	0
Bohemians	Total		0	0	0	0	–		0	0	0	0
Athlone Town	2022	LOI First Division	7	0	0	0	–		–		7	0
Athlone Town	2023	LOI First Division	30	0	1	0	–		3 (Note: 2 appearances in the 2023 League of Ireland First Division Playoffs; 1 appearance in the Leinster Senior Cup)	0	34	0
Athlone Town	2024	LOI First Division	26	0	1	0	–		6 (Note: 3 appearances in the 2024 League of Ireland First Division Playoffs; 3 appearances in the Leinster Senior Cup)	0	0	0
Athlone Town	Total		63	0	2	0	–		9	0	74	0
Dundalk	2025	LOI First Division	18	0	1	0	–		2	0	21	0
Dundalk	2026	LOI Premier Division	30	0	1	0	–		1	0	32	0
Dundalk	Total		48	0	2	0	–		3	0	53	0
Career total			112	0	4	0	0	0	12	0	128	0

== Honours ==
Dundalk

- League of Ireland First Division: 2025
- Leinster Senior Cup: 2024–25
