= 2022 Bohemian F.C. season =

Irish football club season

Bohemian F.C.
2022 season
- Manager: Declan Devine
- Stadium: Dalymount Park, Phibsborough, Dublin 7
- Premier Division: 6th
- FAI Cup: Quarter final (vs. Shelbourne)
- Top goalscorer: League: Dawson Devoy (8 goals); All: Dawson Devoy (8 goals)
- Highest home attendance: 3,590 (vs. Shelbourne, 14 March 2022)
- Lowest home attendance: 2,500 (vs. UCD, 29 April 2022)
- Biggest win: 1–4 (vs. Shelbourne, 18 April 2022)
- Biggest defeat: 0–3 (vs. St Patrick's Athletic, 23 May 2022)
Home colours	Away colours	Third colours

The 2022 League of Ireland season was Bohemian Football Club's 132nd year in their history and their 38th consecutive season in the League of Ireland Premier Division since it became the top tier of Irish football. Bohs finished the campaign in sixth position. Bohemians also participated in the FAI Cup, exiting at the quarter final stage.

Bohs parted ways with long-term manager Keith Long after an eight-year spell in late August with Declan Devine taking the job full-time shortly after.

== Club ==
=== Kits ===
Supplier: O'Neills | Sponsor: Des Kelly Interiors

==== Home ====
Bohemians unveiled their new home kit ahead of the 2022 League of Ireland season on 7 December 2021. The jersey is made by O'Neills, now in their fourth year as the official kit manufacturer for Bohemians, and Des Kelly Interiors as the main sponsor on the front. It features a retro-look design, which means a departure from the traditional red and black stripes for the first time in eight years. The new diamond design stretches across the front, the crest used dates back to 1952 while a lyric "we don’t need nobody else" from Dublin band Whipping Boy is on the back.

==== Away ====
Bohemians announced their new 2022 away jersey on 24 January 2022 in collaboration with the Bob Marley family and Bravado, Universal Music Group’s leading global merchandise division. The jersey pays tribute to Marley’s last ever outdoor concert, which took place in the club’s stadium, Dalymount Park, on 6 July 1980. Bringing together two of people’s greatest loves, music and sport, the one-off jersey pays homage to ‘An Afternoon in the Park’, the famed Marley Dalymount concert, in its design. Featuring red, yellow and green details on the front, as well as the rear neck and sleeve trims, and an embroidered hem tag of the original concert ticket on the lower front.

Ten percent of the profits from the shirt will be used by Bohemian Football Club to purchase musical instruments and football equipment to provide to people in Asylum Centres across Ireland. This will be done in conjunction with club partners Movement of Asylum Seekers in Ireland.

As in recent years the launch of the Bohemians jersey launch was covered globally by major publications, such as ESPN, Forbes and NME.

==== Third ====
Dublin Bus and Bohemian Football Club joined forces to launch a unique one-off jersey, to be worn for all FAI Cup matches. To celebrate Pride Month, 10% of all sales are to be donated to Dublin Bus’ charity partner LGBT Ireland and Bohemians’ partners at ShoutOut. The kit, taking inspiration from Dublin Bus’ iconic seat fabric design, was launched at the Phoenix Park, a stone's throw from where the club was founded in 1890.

=== Management team ===
Position	Name
Manager	(Northern Ireland) Declan Devine
Assistant coach	(Republic of Ireland) Derek Pender
Assistant coach	(Republic of Ireland) Trevor Croly
Goalkeeping coach	(Scotland) Chris Bennion
Head of fitness and conditioning	(England) Remy Tang
Strength and conditioning coach	(Republic of Ireland) Andrew Conroy
Performance coach	(Republic of Ireland) Philly McMahon
Physiotherapist	(Republic of Ireland) Dr Paul Kirwan
Equipment manager	(Republic of Ireland) Colin O Connor
Assistant equipment manager	(Republic of Ireland) Aaron Fitzsimons

=== Former ===
Position	Name	Departure
Head coach	(Republic of Ireland) Keith Long	30 August 2022

== Transfers ==
=== Transfers in ===
Date	Pos.	Player	From	Fee	Source
Winter
18 December 2021	FW	(England) Junior Ogedi-Uzokwe	(Republic of Ireland) Dundalk	Free	
20 December 2021	LB	(Republic of Ireland) Max Murphy	(Republic of Ireland) Shamrock Rovers	Free	
21 December 2021	GK	(Republic of Ireland) Tadgh Ryan	(Republic of Ireland) Treaty United	Free	
21 December 2021	CM	(Republic of Ireland) Jordan Doherty	(United States) Tampa Bay Rowdies	Free	
23 December 2021	LW	(Canada) Kris Twardek	(Slovakia) FK Senica	Free	
21 January 2022	CB	(England) Grant Horton	(England) Cheltenham Town	Loan	
22 January 2022	AM	(Northern Ireland) JJ McKiernan	(England) Watford	Loan	
23 January 2022	FW	(Republic of Ireland) Ryan Cassidy	(England) Watford	Loan	
31 January 2022	AM	(England) Jordan Flores	(England) Northampton Town	Free	
14 February 2022	RB	(England) Sam Packham	(England) Brighton & Hove Albion	Loan	
Summer
8 June 2022	LB	(Republic of Ireland) Ryan Burke	(England) Mansfield Town	Free	
10 June 2022	AM	(Republic of Ireland) John O'Sullivan	(England) Accrington Stanley	Free	
15 June 2022	CM	(Scotland) Josh Kerr	(Scotland) Airdrieonians	Free	
2 July 2022	LM	(Scotland) Declan McDaid	(Scotland) Dundee	Free	
6 July 2022	CF	(Republic of Ireland) Ethon Varian	(England) Stoke City	Free	
21 July 2022	GK	(Scotland) Jon McCracken	(England) Norwich City	Loan	
25 July 2022	MF	(Germany) Laurenz Dehl	(Germany) Union Berlin	Loan	
27 July 2022	MF	(Republic of Ireland) James Clarke	(Republic of Ireland) Drogheda United	Undisclosed	
5 August 2022	FW	(Republic of Ireland) Jonathan Afolabi	(Scotland) Celtic	Free	

=== Transfers out ===
Pos.	Player	To	Date	Fee	Source
Winter
MF	(Republic of Ireland) Jack Moylan	(Republic of Ireland) Shelbourne	29 November 2021	Free	
CB	(Republic of Ireland) Rob Cornwall	(United States) Northern Colorado Hailstorm	10 December 2021	Free	
LB	(Republic of Ireland) Anthony Breslin	(Republic of Ireland) St Patrick's Athletic	18 December 2021	Free	
GK	(Republic of Ireland) Stephen McGuinness	(Republic of Ireland) Bray Wanderers	20 December 2021	Free	
AM	(Republic of Ireland) Keith Ward	(Republic of Ireland) Dundalk	23 December 2021	Free	
AM	(Republic of Ireland) Ross Tierney	(Scotland) Motherwell	23 December 2021	Undisclosed	
CM	(Republic of Ireland) Keith Buckley	(Australia) Blacktown Spartans	31 December 2021	Free	
AM	(Republic of Ireland) Bastien Héry	(Republic of Ireland) Finn Harps	14 January 2022	Free	-
RB	(Republic of Ireland) Andy Lyons	(Republic of Ireland) Shamrock Rovers	24 January 2022	Undisclosed	
FW	(Republic of Ireland) Georgie Kelly	(England) Rotherham United	27 January 2022	Free	
AM	(Republic of Ireland) Roland Idowu	(Republic of Ireland) Waterford	28 January 2022	Free	
FW	(Republic of Ireland) Cole Kiernan	(England) Guisborough Town	3 February 2022	Free	
MF	(Northern Ireland) JJ McKiernan	(England) Watford	20 April 2022	Loan end	
Summer
RB	(England) Sam Packham	(England) Brighton & Hove Albion	10 June 2022	Loan end	
CF	(Republic of Ireland) Ryan Cassidy	(England) Watford	10 June 2022	Loan end	
LM	(Northern Ireland) Stephen Mallon	(Northern Ireland) Cliftonville	2 July 2022	Free	
CB	(Republic of Ireland) James Finnerty	(Republic of Ireland) Galway United	2 July 2022	Loan	
CB	(England) Grant Horton	(England) Cheltenham Town	12 July 2022	Loan ended	
CM	(Republic of Ireland) Dawson Devoy	(England) MK Dons	13 July 2022	Undisclosed	
FW	(Republic of Ireland) Promise Omochere	(England) Fleetwood Town	19 July 2022	Undisclosed	

== Squad ==
No.	Player	Nat.	Pos.	Date of birth (age)	Since	Ends	Last club
Goalkeepers
1	James Talbot	(Republic of Ireland)	GK	24 April 1997 (age 29)	2019	2024	(England) Sunderland
25	Tadgh Ryan	(Republic of Ireland)	GK	9 April 1997 (age 29)	2022	2022	(Republic of Ireland) Treaty United
40	Jon McCracken	(Scotland)	GK	24 May 2000 (age 26)	2022	2022	(England) Norwich City
45	Daithí Folan	(Republic of Ireland)	GK	1 January 2004 (age 22)	2022	2022	(Republic of Ireland) Bohemians U19
99	Reece Byrne	(Republic of Ireland)	GK	20 November 2004 (age 21)	2021	2022	(Republic of Ireland) Bohemians U19
Defenders
2	Josh Kerr	(Scotland)	CB	24 February 1998 (age 28)	2022	2022	(Scotland) Airdrieonians
3	Tyreke Wilson	(Republic of Ireland)	LB	2 December 1999 (age 26)	2021	2022	(Republic of Ireland) Waterford
4	Rory Feely	(Republic of Ireland)	RB	3 January 1997 (age 29)	2021	2022	(Republic of Ireland) St Patrick's Athletic
5	Ciaran Kelly	(Republic of Ireland)	CB	4 July 1998 (age 28)	2020	2022	(Republic of Ireland) St Patrick's Athletic
12	Max Murphy	(Republic of Ireland)	LB	2 June 2001 (age 25)	2022	2024	(Republic of Ireland) Shamrock Rovers
18	Ryan Burke	(Republic of Ireland)	LB	23 November 2000 (age 25)	2022	2022	(England) Mansfield Town
27	Cian Byrne	(Republic of Ireland)	RB	31 January 2003 (age 23)	2022	2022	(Republic of Ireland) Bohemians U19
32	Derin Adewale	(Republic of Ireland)	LB	28 May 2005 (age 21)	2022	2022	(Republic of Ireland) Bohemians U19
33	Jake McCormack	(Republic of Ireland)	CB	4 August 2004 (age 22)	2022	2022	(Republic of Ireland) Bohemians U19
-	James Finnerty	(Republic of Ireland)	CB	1 February 1999 (age 27)	2019	2022	(England) Rochdale
-	Sam Packham	(England)	RB	8 November 2001 (age 24)	2022	2022	(England) Brighton & Hove Albion
-	Grant Horton	(England)	CB	13 September 2001 (age 25)	2022	2022	(England) Cheltenham Town
Midfielders
6	Jordan Doherty	(Republic of Ireland)	CM	29 August 2000 (age 26)	2022	2023	(United States) Tampa Bay Rowdies
7	Declan McDaid	(Scotland)	MF	22 November 1995 (age 30)	2022	2022	(Scotland) Dundee
8	Ali Coote	(Scotland)	RM	11 June 1998 (age 28)	2021	2022	(Republic of Ireland) Waterford
11	Liam Burt	(Scotland)	LM	1 February 1999 (age 27)	2021	2022	(Scotland) Celtic
13	Alex O Brien	(Republic of Ireland)	DM	21 September 2002 (age 24)	2022	2022	(Republic of Ireland) Bohemians U19
14	Conor Levingston	(Republic of Ireland)	CM	21 January 1998 (age 28)	2019	2022	(England) Wolverhampton Wanderers
15	James Clarke	(Republic of Ireland)	MF	28 January 2001 (age 25)	2022	2024	(Republic of Ireland) Drogheda United
17	John O'Sullivan	(Republic of Ireland)	MF	18 September 1993 (age 33)	2022	2022	(England) Accrington Stanley
21	Jordan Flores	(England)	CM	4 October 1995 (age 30)	2022	2024	(England) Northampton Town
22	Jamie Mullins	(Republic of Ireland)	AM	29 September 2004 (age 21)	2021	2022	(Republic of Ireland) Bohemians U19
23	Kris Twardek	(Canada)	LM	8 March 1997 (age 29)	2022	2024	(Slovakia) FK Senica
24	Aaron Doran	(Republic of Ireland)	CM	23 May 2003 (age 23)	2021	2021	(Republic of Ireland) Bohemians U19
26	Jack O’Reilly	(Republic of Ireland)	MF	20 February 2004 (age 22)	2022	2022	(Republic of Ireland) St Patrick's Athletic
28	James McManus	(Republic of Ireland)	MF	1 May 2005 (age 21)	2022	2025	(Republic of Ireland) Bohemians U19
31	Laurenz Dehl	(Germany)	MF	12 December 2001 (age 24)	2022	2022	(Germany) Union Berlin
-	Stephen Mallon	(Northern Ireland)	LM	7 February 1999 (age 27)	2021	2022	(England) Sheffield United
-	JJ McKiernan	(Northern Ireland)	AM	18 January 2002 (age 24)	2022	2022	(England) Watford
-	Dawson Devoy	(Republic of Ireland)	CM	20 November 2001 (age 24)	2019	2022	(Republic of Ireland) Bohemians U19
Forwards
9	Junior Ogedi-Uzokwe	(England)	CF	3 March 1994 (age 32)	2022	2024	(Republic of Ireland) Dundalk
10	Chris Lotefa	(Republic of Ireland)	CF	8 August 2004 (age 22)	2022	2022	(Republic of Ireland) Bohemians U19
18	Ethon Varian	(Republic of Ireland)	CF	17 September 2001 (age 25)	2022	2022	(England) Stoke City
20	Jonathan Afolabi	(Republic of Ireland)	CF	14 January 2000 (age 26)	2022	2022	(Scotland) Celtic
30	Nickson Okosun	(Republic of Ireland)	CF	26 November 2006 (age 19)	2022	2022	(Republic of Ireland) Bohemians U19
-	Promise Omochere	(Republic of Ireland)	CF	18 October 2000 (age 25)	2019	2024	(Republic of Ireland) Bohemians U19
-	Ryan Cassidy	(Republic of Ireland)	CF	2 March 2001 (age 25)	2022	2022	(England) Watford

Last updated: 5 August 2022.
Source: Competitions

Players in italics left club during season

== Friendlies ==
=== Pre-season ===
21 January 2022 Friendly	Bohemians	2–3	St Patrick's Athletic	Abbotstown, Dublin
19:00 GMT	Mullins 20'; Omochere 71'		E. Doyle 22'; Robinson 64'; M. Doyle 88'	Stadium: FAI National Training Centre; Attendance: 0
Note: Behind closed doors fixture

25 January 2022 Friendly	Dundalk	1–5	Bohemians	Dundalk
14:00 GMT	Doyle 85'		Omochere 15', 28'; Horton 33'; Coote 40'; Finnerty 52'	Stadium: Oriel Park; Attendance: 0
Note: Behind closed doors fixture

28 January 2022 Friendly	Bohemians	1–0	Bray Wanderers	Cloughran, Dublin
19:30 GMT	Twardek 87'			Stadium: AUL Complex; Attendance: 0
Note: Behind closed doors fixture

1 February 2022 Friendly	Bohemians	1–1	Longford Town	Abbotstown, Dublin
19:30 GMT	Omochere 5'		Molloy 13'	Stadium: FAI National Training Centre; Attendance: 0
Note: Behind closed doors fixture

5 February 2022 Friendly	Waterford	2–2	Bohemians	Waterford
13:00 GMT	Kavanagh 40' (pen.); Britton 78'		Coote 4'; Feely 14'	Stadium: Regional Sports Centre

11 February 2022 Friendly	Galway United	0–0	Bohemians	Galway
19:45 GMT				Stadium: Eamonn Deacy Park

12 February 2022 Friendly	Glebe North	2-1	Bohemians	Balbriggan, Dublin
14:00 GMT	Bodurri 20'; Dunbar 40'		Devoy 40' (pen.)	Stadium: Market Green

=== Mid-season ===
10 June 2022 Friendly	Bohemians	0-3	Dundalk	Phibsborough, Dublin
19:00 GMT			O’Kane; Bradley; Feely (o.g.)	Stadium: Dalymount Park

9 July 2022 Friendly	Union Berlin (Germany)	2-1	(Republic of Ireland) Bohemians	Berlin, Germany
15:30 CET	Doekhi 12'; Voglsammer 68'	Report	Coote 74'	Stadium: Stadion An der Alten Försterei; Attendance: 15,987

== Competitions ==
=== League of Ireland ===
==== League table ====
Pos	Team	Pld	W	D	L	GF	GA	GD	Pts	Qualification or relegation
1	Shamrock Rovers (C)	36	24	7	5	61	22	+39	79	Qualification for Champions League first qualifying round
2	Derry City	36	18	12	6	53	27	+26	66	Qualification for Europa Conference League first qualifying round
3	Dundalk	36	18	12	6	53	30	+23	66	Qualification for Europa Conference League first qualifying round
4	St Patrick's Athletic	36	18	7	11	57	37	+20	61	Qualification for Europa Conference League first qualifying round
5	Sligo Rovers	36	13	10	13	47	44	+3	49	
6	Bohemians	36	12	10	14	45	46	−1	46	
7	Shelbourne	36	10	11	15	40	49	−9	41	
8	Drogheda United	36	9	11	16	34	58	−24	38	
9	UCD (O)	36	6	8	22	28	67	−39	26	Qualification for relegation play-offs
10	Finn Harps (R)	36	4	8	24	33	71	−38	20	Relegation to 2023 League of Ireland First Division

Source: SSE Airtricity League, Soccerway
Rules for classification: 1) Points; 2) Goal difference; 3) Goals scored.
(C) Champions; (O) Play-off winners; (R) Relegated

==== Results summary ====
Overall								Home						Away					
Pld	W	D	L	GF	GA	GD	Pts	W	D	L	GF	GA	GD	W	D	L	GF	GA	GD
36	12	10	14	45	46	−1	46	7	5	6	25	23	+2	5	5	8	20	23	−3

==== Results by matchday ====
Matchday	1	2	3	4	5	6	7	8	9	10	11	12	13	14	15	16	17	18	19	20	21	22	23	24	25	26	27	28	29	30	31	32	33	34	35	36
Ground	H	H	A	A	H	A	H	A	A	H	A	H	H	A	A	H	A	H	H	A	H	A	A	A	H	A	H	H	A	A	H	H	A	H	A	H
Result	D	W	D	L	D	D	L	W	D	D	W	L	W	D	L	W	L	D	W	L	L	W	W	L	L	D	L	W	L	W	W	L	L	D	L	W
Position	7	4	5	6	6	6	7	6	6	6	6	6	6	6	6	5	7	7	6	6	6	6	6	6	6	6	6	6	6	6	5	6	6	6	6	6

A = Away; H = Home; W = Win; D = Draw; L = Loss

==== Matches ====
Win Draw Loss

19 February 2022 Round 1	Sligo Rovers	P-P	Bohemians	Sligo
19:45 GMT				Stadium: The Showgrounds
Note: Game called off after The Showgrounds failed a 10:30am pitch inspection due to Storm Eunice.

25 February 2022 Round 2	Bohemians	2–2	Dundalk	Phibsborough, Dublin
19:45 GMT	Flores 28'; Omochere 45'; Finnerty (yellow card) 83'	Report	Hoban 29'; Williams (yellow card) 32'; Bradley 56'; Kelly (yellow card) 62'; Bone (yellow card) 77'	Stadium: Dalymount Park; Attendance: 3512; Referee: Paul McLaughlin

28 February 2022 Round 3	Bohemians	1–0	St Patrick's Athletic	Phibsborough, Dublin
19:45 GMT	Mallon 49'; Flores (yellow card) 90+1'	Report		Stadium: Dalymount Park; Attendance: 3516; Referee: Neil Doyle

4 March 2022 Round 4	Finn Harps	1–1	Bohemians	Ballybofey
20:00 GMT	Boyle (yellow card) 26'; Mahdy (yellow card) 26'; Mihaljević (yellow card) 27'; Ryan Connolly (yellow card) 29', (goal) 65'; Élie N'Zeyi (yellow card) 56'	Report	Finnerty (yellow card) 21'; Omochere 51' (yellow card) 26' (yellow-red card) 88'	Stadium: Finn Park; Attendance: 2,500; Referee: Damien McGraith

11 March 2022 Round 5	Shamrock Rovers	1-0	Bohemians	Tallaght, Dublin
20:00 GMT	Gaffney 25'; Hoare (yellow card) 56'; Lopes (yellow card) 68'; Cotter (yellow card) 90'	Report	Flores (yellow card) 44'; Wilson (yellow card) 83'	Stadium: Tallaght Stadium; Attendance: 7478; Referee: Rob Hennessy

14 March 2022 Round 6	Bohemians	1–1	Shelbourne	Phibsborough, Dublin
19:45 GMT	Feely (yellow card) 26' (yellow-red card) 75'; Horton (yellow card) 65', (goal) 87'; Mallon (yellow card) 70'; Wilson (yellow card) 88'; Burt (yellow card) 90'	Report	Wilson (yellow card) 26'; Farrell (yellow card) 45'; Boyd 75'; McManus (yellow card) 88'	Stadium: Dalymount Park; Attendance: 3590; Referee: Rob Harvey

18 March 2022 Round 7	UCD	1–1	Bohemians	Belfield, Dublin
17:00 GMT	Higgins (yellow card) 52'; Todd 68'; Verdon (yellow card) 73'	Report	Omochere 6'; Cassidy (yellow card) 90'	Stadium: UCD Bowl; Attendance: 1600; Referee: Rob Hennesey

1 April 2022 Round 8	Bohemians	1–2	Derry City	Phibsborough, Dublin
19:45 IST	Burt 26'; Feely (yellow card) 61'; Devoy (yellow card) 82'	Report	Dummigan (yellow card) 37'; Thomson (yellow card) 45'; Boyce 60'; Akintunde 90+3'	Stadium: Dalymount Park; Attendance: 3320; Referee: Adriano Reale

5 April 2022 Round 1	Sligo Rovers	0–1	Bohemians	Sligo
19:45 GMT	Bolger (yellow card) 67'	Report	Burt 26'; Wilson (yellow card) 44'	Stadium: The Showgrounds; Attendance: 3257; Referee: David Dunne
Note: Rescheduled game from week 1 after original fixture was called off after failed pitch inspection due to Storm Eunice.

8 April 2022 Round 9	Drogheda United	1–1	Bohemians	Drogheda
19:45 IST	Williams 88'; Cowan (yellow card) 62'; Massey (yellow card) 90'	Report	Devoy 6' (pen.); Horton (yellow card) 64'	Stadium: United Park; Attendance: 1381; Referee: Paul Mc Laughlin

15 April 2022 Round 10	Bohemians	2–2	Finn Harps	Phibsborough, Dublin
19:45 IST	Devoy 49' (pen.); Coote 57'	Report	McWoods (red card) 8'; Mihaljević 20' (pen.); Boyle (yellow card) 45'; Rainey (yellow card) 31' (yellow-red card) 90+1'; Hery (yellow card) 90+2'; Timlin 90+3'	Stadium: Dalymount Park; Attendance: 3235; Referee: Sean Grant

18 April 2022 Round 11	Shelbourne	1–4	Bohemians	Drumcondra, Dublin
15:00 IST	Boyd 21'	Report	Levingston (yellow card) 12>'; Burt 13'; Devoy 45' (pen.); Twardek 50'; Ogedi-Uzokwe 67'	Stadium: Tolka Park; Attendance: 4100; Referee: Paul Mc Loughlin

22 April 2022 Round 12	Bohemians	1-3	Shamrock Rovers	Phibsborough, Dublin
19:45 IST	Ogedi-Uzokwe 68' (yellow card) 21'; Murphy (yellow card) 32'		Lyons 4'; Murphy 35' (own goal); Mandroiu 69'; Lopes (yellow card) 19'; Towell (yellow card) 28'	Stadium: Dalymount Park; Attendance: 3,640; Referee: Neil Doyle

29 April 2022 Round 13	Bohemians	3-0	UCD	Phibsborough, Dublin
19:45 IST	Ogedi-Uzokwe 43'; Devoy 65' (pen.); Omochere 60'	Report	Higgins (yellow card) 28'; Kerrigan (yellow card) 68'	Stadium: Dalymount Park; Attendance: 2500; Referee: Ray Matthews

6 May 2022 Round 14	Derry City	1-1	Bohemians	Derry
19:45 IST	Omochere 15' (yellow card) 21'; Kelly (yellow card) 30'	Report	Patching 35' (pen.); Smith (yellow card) 61'; Boyce (yellow card) 66'	Stadium: Ryan McBride Brandywell Stadium; Attendance: 3500; Referee: Adriano Reale

13 May 2022 Round 15	Dundalk	3-1	Bohemians	Dundalk
19:45 IST	Hoban 50'; Benson 70'; Doyle 77'; Slogett (yellow card) 62'; Ward (yellow card) 90'	Report	Kelly 15'; Coote (yellow card) 84'; Cassidy (yellow card) 89'	Stadium: Oriel Park; Attendance: 2748; Referee: Sean Grant

20 May 2022 Round 16	Bohemians	2-1	Sligo Rovers	Phibsborough, Dublin
19:45 IST	Devoy 61'; Ogedi-Uzokwe 76'; Wilson (yellow card) 90'	Report	Mc Donnell 88' (yellow card) 80'; Bolger (yellow card) 39'; Hamilton (yellow card) 90'	Stadium: Dalymount Park; Attendance: 3450; Referee: Rob Hennessy

23 May 2022 Round 17	St Patrick's Athletic	3-0	Bohemians	Inchicore, Dublin
19:45 IST	Owolabi 5' 45' 68' (pen.); O'Reilly (yellow card) 80'	Report	Coote (yellow card) 35'; Murphy (yellow card) 64'	Stadium: Richmond Park; Attendance: 3900; Referee: Neil Doyle

27 May 2022 Round 18	Bohemians	1-1	Drogheda United	Phibsborough, Dublin
19:45 IST	Flores 45'; Ogedi-Uzokwe (yellow card) 30'; Doherty (yellow card) 59'	Report	Williams 84'; Roughan (yellow card) 22'; Deegan (yellow card) 35'; Heeney (yellow card) 81'	Stadium: Dalymount Park; Attendance: 3100; Referee: Sean Grant

10 June 2022 Round 19	Finn Harps	P-P	Bohemians	Ballybofey
20:00 GMT				Stadium: Finn Park
Note: Game postponed due to international call-ups.

17 June 2022 Round 20	Bohemians	1-0	Shelbourne	Phibsborough, Dublin
19:45 GMT	Devoy 12' (yellow card) 79'; Coote (yellow card) 11' Kelly (red card) 53'; Murphy (yellow card) 79'	Report	Kane (yellow card) 42'	Stadium: Dalymount Park; Attendance: 3500; Referee: Sean Grant

24 June 2022 Round 21	Shamrock Rovers	1-0	Bohemians	Tallaght, Dublin
20:00 GMT	Gaffney 47'; Kavanagh (yellow card) 8'; Mandroiu (yellow card) 56'; Watts (yellow card) 60'; McCann (yellow card) 87'	Report	Levingston (yellow card) 31'; Coote (yellow card) 64'	Stadium: Tallaght Stadium; Attendance: 7445; Referee: Rob Harvey

1 July 2022 Round 22	Bohemians	2-3	Derry City	Phibsborough, Dublin
19:45 IST	Thomson 41'; Smith 60'; Dawson Devoy 75' (o.g.) Max Murphy (yellow card) 79'	Report	Coote 58'; Dawson Devoy 85'	Stadium: Dalymount Park; Attendance: 3,100; Referee: Paul McLaughlin

7 July 2022 Round 23	UCD	1-3	Bohemians	Belfield, Dublin
19:45 GMT	Lonergan 31'; Higgins (yellow card) 77'; Todd (red card) 81'; Ryan (yellow card) 87'	Report	Flores 36' (yellow card) 71'; Burt 45'; Devoy 90' (pen.)	Stadium: UCD Bowl; Attendance: 1363; Referee: Alan Patchell

15 July 2022 Round 24	Drogheda United	0-1	Bohemians	Drogheda
19:45 IST	Weir (yellow card) 34'; Brennan (yellow card) 90'	Report	Liam Burt 75'	Stadium: United Park; Attendance: 1950; Referee: Paul McLaughlin

22 July 2022 Round 25	Bohemians	v	St Patrick's Athletic	Phibsborough, Dublin
19:45 GMT				Stadium: Dalymount Park
Note: Postponed due to St.Pat’s involvement in Europe

7 August 2022 Round 26	Sligo Rovers	2-1	Bohemians	Sligo
16:45 GMT	Mata 64' 67'; Kirk (yellow card) 11'; Blaney (yellow card) 41'; Morahan (yellow card) 69'	Report	O'Sullivan 57' (yellow card) 85'; Burt (yellow card) 17'; McDaid (yellow card) 44'	Stadium: The Showgrounds; Attendance: 3500; Referee: Ray Matthews

12 August 2022 Round 27	Bohemians	0–1	Dundalk	Phibsborough, Dublin
19:45 GMT	Levingston (yellow card) 77'	Report	Martin 45' (yellow card) 13'; Boyle (red card) 0'; Bone (yellow card) 68'; Shepperd (yellow card) 84'	Stadium: Dalymount Park; Attendance: 3400; Referee: Adriano Reale

19 August 2022 Round 28	Shelbourne	1-1	Bohemians	Drumcondra, Dublin
19:45 IST	Farrell 45' (pen.); O'Driscoll (yellow card) 4'; Wilson (red card) 0'; Moylan (yellow card) 45'; Griffin (yellow card) 61'; McManus (yellow card) 69'; Molloy (yellow card) 69'; Dervin (yellow card) 90'	Report	Wilson 5' (yellow card) 41'; Varian (yellow card) 11'; Burke (yellow card) 45'	Stadium: Tolka Park; Attendance: 4000; Referee: Neil Doyle

29 August 2022 Round 25	Bohemians	1-3	St Patrick's Athletic	Phibsborough, Dublin
19:45 GMT	Feely 62' (yellow card) 90'	Report	Cotter 9'; Forrester 45'; O'Reilly 89'; Lennon (yellow card) 34'; Brockbank (yellow card) 63'; Breslin (yellow card) 77'	Stadium: Dalymount Park; Attendance: 3395; Referee: Paul McLaughlin
Note: Rearranged fixture from round 25

2 September 2022 Round 29	Bohemians	1-0	Shamrock Rovers	Phibsborough, Dublin
19:45 IST	Burt 72'; Varian (yellow card) 46'; Twardek (yellow card) 54'; Wilson (yellow card) 66'	Report	Cleary (yellow card) 55'; Watts (yellow card) 66' (red card) 0'; Hoare (yellow card) 76'	Stadium: Dalymount Park; Attendance: 3230; Referee: Rob Hennessy

9 September 2022 Round 30	Derry City	1-0	Bohemians	Derry
19:45 IST	Duffy 39'; McJannet (yellow card) 60' S McEleney (yellow card) 63'	Report	Varian (yellow card) 45'	Stadium: Ryan McBride Brandywell Stadium; Attendance: 3700; Referee: Neil Doyle

27 September 2022 Round 19	Finn Harps	0-2	Bohemians	Ballybofey
16:00 GMT	Donelon (yellow card) 51'; Rainey (yellow card) 68' (red card) 0'; Boyle (yellow card) 90'; Boylan (yellow card) 90+2'	Report	McDaid 55'; Doherty 83'; Lotefa (yellow card) 68' Kelly (yellow card) 69'	Stadium: Finn Park; Attendance: TBA; Referee: Damien McGraith
Note: Game rearranged from Round 19

30 September 2022 Round 31	Bohemians	1-0	UCD	Phibsborough, Dublin
19:45 IST	Clarke 40' (yellow card) 36'; Flores 53'	Report	Dunne (yellow card) 15'; Gallagher (red card) 80'	Stadium: Dalymount Park; Attendance: 3100; Referee: Ray Matthews

7 October 2022 Round 32	Bohemians	0-1	Drogehda United	Phibsborough, Dublin
19:45 IST	Rooney 90+3'; Deegan (yellow card) 88'	Report	Flores (yellow card) 42' (red card) 70'; Kelly (yellow card) 44'	Stadium: Dalymount Park; Attendance: 3000; Referee: Ben Connolly

14 October 2022 33	St Patrick's Athletic	3–1	Bohemians	Inchicore, Dublin
19:45 GMT	Serge Atakayi 7'; Sam Curtis (yellow card) 26'; Mark Doyle 48'; Tunde Owolabi 87'	Report	Conor Levingston (yellow card) 17'; James Clarke (yellow card) 69'; James McManus (yellow card) 81'; James Clarke 83'; Kris Twardek (yellow card) 84'; Chris Lotefa (yellow card) 90+3'	Stadium: Richmond Park; Attendance: 5,106; Referee: Adriano Reale

21 October 2022 Round 34	Bohemians	2-2	Finn Harps	Phibsborough, Dublin
19:45 IST	Varian 63'; McDaid 90'	Report	Boyle 76'; Mihaljević (penalty missed) 79' (yellow card) 89'; McWoods (yellow card) 70'; Rainey (yellow card) 90+1'	Stadium: Dalymount Park; Attendance: 2980; Referee: Ben Connolly

28 October 2022 Round 35	Dundalk	2-1	Bohemians	Dundalk
19:45 IST	Mountney 22'; Hauge 39'; Boyle (yellow card) 33'; Leahy (yellow card) 69'; Shepperd (yellow card) 86'		Varian 89'; Burt (yellow card) 90+2'	Stadium: Oriel Park; Referee: Adriano Reale

6 November 2022 Round 36	Bohemians	3-1	Sligo Rovers	Phibsborough, Dublin
19:00 GMT	Clancy (OG) 45'; Feely 49' (yellow card) 45'; Clarke 61'; Twardek (yellow card) 80'; Doherty (yellow card) 80'	Report	Keena 75'; Clancy (yellow card) 78'; Bolger (yellow card) 90'	Stadium: Dalymount Park; Attendance: 3000; Referee: Damien MacGraith

=== FAI Cup ===
29 July 2022 First Round	Finn Harps	1-3	Bohemians	Ballybofey
19:45	Boyle (yellow card) 14'; Connolly (yellow card) 25'		McDaid 19'; Kerr 43'; Junior 48'; Clarke (yellow card) 6' O'Sullivan (yellow card) 14'	Stadium: Finn Park; Attendance: 2100; Referee: Rob Harvey

26 August 2022 Second Round	Lucan United	0-2	Bohemians	Phibsborough
19:45	McKay (red card) 75'	Report	Burt 32'; Afolabi 35'	Stadium: Dalymount Park; Attendance: 3000; Referee: Kevin O Sullivan

2 September 2022 Quarter Final	Shelbourne	3–0	Bohemians	Drumcondra, Dublin
14:00	Moylan 21'; Boyd 39', 72'	Report		Stadium: Tolka Park; Attendance: 3500; Referee: Rob Harvey

=== Overview ===
Competition	Record							
Competition	P	W	D	L	GF	GA	GD	Win %
Premier Division	36	12	10	14	45	46	−1	33.33
FAI Cup	3	2	0	1	5	5	+0	66.67
Total	38	13	10	15	47	50	−3	34.21

Updated to match played 6 November 2022
Source: Competitions

== Statistics ==
=== Appearances and goals ===
No.	Pos.	Player	Premier Division		FAI Cup		Total	
No.	Pos.	Player	Apps	Goals	Apps	Goals	Apps	Goals
1	GK	(Republic of Ireland) James Talbot	18	0	0	0	18	0
2	DF	(Scotland) Josh Kerr	7(1)	0	2	1	9(1)	1
3	DF	(Republic of Ireland) Tyreke Wilson	26(3)	1	2	0	27(3)	1
4	DF	(Republic of Ireland) Rory Feely	27(6)	2	2	0	29(6)	2
5	DF	(Republic of Ireland) Ciaran Kelly	32(3)	1	3	0	35(3)	1
6	MF	(Republic of Ireland) Jordan Doherty	32(10)	1	2	0	33(10)	1
7	MF	(Scotland) Declan McDaid	14 (5)	2	3(2)	1	17 (7)	3
8	MF	(Scotland) Ali Coote	30(4)	2	3(2)	0	32(6)	2
9	FW	(England) Junior Ogedi-Uzokwe	19(5)	4	1	1	20(5)	4
10	FW	(Republic of Ireland) Chris Lotefa	2(2)	0	0	0	2(2)	0
11	MF	(Scotland) Liam Burt	28(8)	6	3	1	30(8)	7
12	DF	(Republic of Ireland) Max Murphy	23(7)	0	1(1)	0	24(8)	0
13	MF	(Republic of Ireland) Alex O Brien	0	0	0	0	0	0
14	MF	(Republic of Ireland) Conor Levingston	25(3)	0	2(1)	0	27(4)	0
15	MF	(Republic of Ireland) James Clarke	12(1)	3	3	0	15(1)	3
17	MF	(Republic of Ireland) John O'Sullivan	7(2)	1	3	0	10(2)	1
18	CF	(Republic of Ireland) Ethon Varian	13(3)	2	3(2)	0	16(5)	2
19	DF	(Republic of Ireland) Ryan Burke	5 (2)	0	2(1)	0	7 (2)	0
20	FW	(Republic of Ireland) Jonathan Afolabi	3(2)	0	1	1	4(2)	1
21	MF	(England) Jordan Flores	27(5)	3	2(1)	0	29(6)	3
22	MF	(Republic of Ireland) Jamie Mullins	17(14)	0	1(1)	0	18(15)	0
23	MF	(Canada) Kris Twardek	30(5)	1	3(2)	1(1)	33(7)	1
24	MF	(Republic of Ireland) Aaron Doran	2(1)	0	0	0	2(1)	0
25	GK	(Republic of Ireland) Tadgh Ryan	12	0	1	0	13	0
26	MF	(Republic of Ireland) Jack O’Reilly	0	0	0	0	0	0
27	DF	(Republic of Ireland) Cian Byrne	1(1)	0	1(1)	0	2(2)	0
28	MF	(Republic of Ireland) James McManus	12(8)	0	1(1)	0	13(9)	0
30	FW	(Republic of Ireland) Nickson Okosun	0	0	0	0	0	0
31	MF	(Germany) Laurenz Dehl	1	0	0	0	1	0
32	DF	(Republic of Ireland) Derin Adewale	1(1)	0	0	0	1(1)	0
33	DF	(Republic of Ireland) Jake McCormack	1(1)	0	0	0	1(1)	0
40	GK	(Scotland) Jon McCracken	5	0	2	0	7	0
45	GK	(Republic of Ireland) Daithí Folan	0	0	0	0	0	0
99	GK	(Republic of Ireland) Reece Byrne	1	0	0	0	1	0
-	FW	(Republic of Ireland) Promise Omochere	22(1)	5	0	0	22(1)	5
-	MF	(Republic of Ireland) Dawson Devoy	22(2)	8	0	0	22(2)	8
-	MF	(Northern Ireland) Stephen Mallon	10 (5)	1	0	0	10 (5)	1
-	MF	(Northern Ireland) JJ McKiernan	1 (1)	0	0	0	1 (1)	0
-	FW	(Republic of Ireland) Ryan Cassidy	7(6)	0	0	0	7(6)	0
-	DF	(England) Sam Packham	6(1)	0	0	0	6(1)	0
-	DF	(Republic of Ireland) James Finnerty	7(4)	0	0	0	7(4)	0
-	DF	(England) Grant Horton	11	1	0	0	11	1

Players in Italics left during the season

Last updated: 6 November 2022.
Source: Competitions

=== Top Scorers ===
No.	Pos.	Player	Premier Division	FAI Cup	Total
-	MF	(Republic of Ireland) Dawson Devoy	8	0	8
11	MF	(Scotland) Liam Burt	6	1	7
-	FW	(Republic of Ireland) Promise Omochere	5	0	5
9	FW	(England) Junior Ogedi-Uzokwe	4	1	5
21	MF	(England) Jordan Flores	3	0	3
7	MF	(Scotland) Declan McDaid	2	1	3
15	MF	(Republic of Ireland) James Clarke	3	0	3
8	MF	(Scotland) Ali Coote	2	0	2
18	FW	(Republic of Ireland) Ethon Varian	2	0	2
4	DF	(Republic of Ireland) Rory Feely	2	0	2
15	DF	(England) Grant Horton	1	0	1
23	MF	(Canada) Kris Twardek	1	0	1
5	DF	(Republic of Ireland) Ciaran Kelly	1	0	1
2	DF	(Scotland) Josh Kerr	0	1	1
17	MF	(Republic of Ireland) John O'Sullivan	0	1	1
3	DF	(Republic of Ireland) Tyreke Wilson	1	0	1
20	FW	(Republic of Ireland) Jonathan Afolabi	0	1	1
6	FW	(Republic of Ireland) Jordan Doherty	1	0	1
-	DF	(Northern Ireland) Stephen Mallon	1	0	1
-	-	Own goals	1	0	1
Total			45	5	50

Players in Italics left during season

Last updated: 6 November 2022.
Source: Competitions

=== Clean Sheets ===
No.	Pos.	Player	Premier Division	FAI Cup	Total
1	GK	(Republic of Ireland) James Talbot	3/18	0/0	3/18
25	GK	(Republic of Ireland) Tadgh Ryan	3/12	0/1	3/13
40	GK	(Scotland) Jon McCracken	2/5	1/2	3/7
99	GK	(Republic of Ireland) Reece Byrne	0/1	0/0	0/1
45	GK	(Republic of Ireland) Daithí Folan	0/0	0/0	0/0
Total			8/36	1/3	9/39

Last updated: 6 November 2022.
Source: Competitions

=== Discipline ===
No.	Pos.	Player	Premier Division			FAI Cup			Total		
No.	Pos.	Player	Booked	(yellow card) (yellow-red card)	Sent off (straight red)	Booked	(yellow card) (yellow-red card)	Sent off (straight red)	Booked	(yellow card) (yellow-red card)	Sent off (straight red)
1	GK	(Republic of Ireland) James Talbot	0	0	0	0	0	0	0	0	0
2	DF	(Scotland) Josh Kerr	0	0	0	0	0	0	0	0	0
3	DF	(Republic of Ireland) Tyreke Wilson	5	0	0	0	0	0	5	0	0
4	DF	(Republic of Ireland) Rory Feely	3	1	0	0	0	0	3	1	0
5	DF	(Republic of Ireland) Ciaran Kelly	5	0	1	0	0	0	5	0	1
6	MF	(Republic of Ireland) Jordan Doherty	2	0	0	0	0	0	2	0	0
7	MF	(Scotland) Declan McDaid	1	0	0	0	0	0	1	0	0
8	MF	(Scotland) Ali Coote	4	0	0	0	0	0	4	0	0
9	FW	(England) Junior Ogedi-Uzokwe	2	0	0	0	0	0	2	0	0
10	FW	(Republic of Ireland) Chris Lotefa	2	0	0	0	0	0	2	0	0
11	MF	(Scotland) Liam Burt	2	0	0	0	0	0	2	0	0
12	DF	(Republic of Ireland) Max Murphy	4	0	0	0	0	0	4	0	0
13	MF	(Republic of Ireland) Alex O'Brien	0	0	0	0	0	0	0	0	0
14	MF	(Republic of Ireland) Conor Levingston	4	0	0	1	0	0	5	0	0
15	MF	(Republic of Ireland) James Clarke	2	0	0	2	0	0	2	0	0
17	MF	(Republic of Ireland) John O'Sullivan	1	0	0	1	0	0	2	0	0
18	CF	(Republic of Ireland) Ethon Varian	3	0	0	1	0	0	4	0	0
19	DF	(Republic of Ireland) Ryan Burke	1	0	0	0	0	0	1	0	0
20	FW	(Republic of Ireland) Jonathan Afolabi	0	0	0	0	0	0	0	0	0
21	DF	(England) Jordan Flores	5	1	0	0	0	0	5	1	0
22	MF	(Republic of Ireland) Jamie Mullins	0	0	0	0	0	0	0	0	0
23	MF	(Canada) Kris Twardek	3	0	0	0	0	0	3	0	0
24	MF	(Republic of Ireland) Aaron Doran	0	0	0	0	0	0	0	0	0
25	GK	(Republic of Ireland) Tadgh Ryan	0	0	0	0	0	0	0	0	0
26	MF	(Republic of Ireland) Jake O’Reilly	0	0	0	0	0	0	0	0	0
27	DF	(Republic of Ireland) Cian Byrne	0	0	0	0	0	0	0	0	0
28	MF	(Republic of Ireland) James McManus	1	0	0	0	0	0	1	0	0
30	FW	(Republic of Ireland) Nickson Okosun	0	0	0	0	0	0	0	0	0
31	MF	(Germany) Laurenz Dehl	0	0	0	0	0	0	0	0	0
32	DF	(Republic of Ireland) Derin Adewale	0	0	0	0	0	0	0	0	0
33	DF	(Republic of Ireland) Jake McCormack	0	0	0	0	0	0	0	0	0
40	GK	(Scotland) Jon McCracken	0	0	0	0	0	0	0	0	0
45	GK	(Republic of Ireland) Daithí Folan	0	0	0	0	0	0	0	0	0
99	GK	(Republic of Ireland) Reece Byrne	0	0	0	0	0	0	0	0	0
-	MF	(Northern Ireland) Stephen Mallon	1	0	0	0	0	0	1	0	0
-	MF	(Northern Ireland) JJ McKiernan	0	0	0	0	0	0	0	0	0
-	FW	(Republic of Ireland) Ryan Cassidy	3	0	0	0	0	0	3	0	0
-	DF	(Republic of Ireland) James Finnerty	2	0	0	0	0	0	2	0	0
-	DF	(England) Sam Packham	0	0	0	0	0	0	0	0	0
-	DF	(England) Grant Horton	2	0	0	0	0	0	2	0	0
-	MF	(Republic of Ireland) Dawson Devoy	2	0	0	0	0	0	2	0	0
-	FW	(Republic of Ireland) Promise Omochere	2	1	0	0	0	0	2	1	0
Total			60	4	0	6	0	0	66	4	0

Players in Italics left during the season

Last updated: 6 November 2022.
Source: Competitions

=== Captains ===
No.	Pos.	Player	No. Games	Notes
14	MF	(Republic of Ireland) Conor Levingston	20	Captain
21	MF	(England) Jordan Flores	9	Vice-captain
5	DF	(Republic of Ireland) Ciaran Kelly	5	
3	DF	(Republic of Ireland) Tyreke Wilson	5	

Last updated: 6 November 2022
Source: Competitive match reports.
Competitive matches only
Matches started as captain only
Country: FIFA nationality; No.: Squad number; P: Position; Name: Player name; No. Games: Number of games started as captain.

== International call-ups ==
=== Republic of Ireland National Team ===
Player	Fixture	Date	Location	Event
James Talbot	vs. Belgium	26 March 2022	Dublin, Ireland	Friendly
James Talbot	vs. Lithuania	29 March 2022	Dublin, Ireland	Friendly
James Talbot	vs. Ukraine	8 June 2022	Dublin, Ireland	UEFA Nations League
James Talbot	vs. Scotland	11 June 2022	Dublin, Ireland	UEFA Nations League

=== Republic of Ireland Under 21 National Team ===
Player	Fixture	Date	Location	Event
Dawson Devoy	vs. Sweden	29 March 2022	Borås, Sweden	2023 UEFA European Under-21 Championship qualification
Dawson Devoy	vs. (Bosnia and Herzegovina) Bosnia & Herzegovina	3 June 2022	Dublin, Ireland	2023 UEFA European Under-21 Championship qualification
Dawson Devoy	vs. Montenegro	6 June 2022	Dublin, Ireland	2023 UEFA European Under-21 Championship qualification
Dawson Devoy	vs. Italy	14 June 2022	Ascoli, Italy	2023 UEFA European Under-21 Championship qualification

=== Republic of Ireland Under 19 National Team ===
Player	Fixture	Date	Location	Event
Jamie Mullins	vs. Iceland	1 June 2022	Pinatar, Spain	Friendly
Jamie Mullins	vs. Iceland	4 June 2022	Pinatar, Spain	Friendly
James McManus	vs. Iceland	1 June 2022	Pinatar, Spain	Friendly
James McManus	vs. Iceland	4 June 2022	Pinatar, Spain	Friendly

=== Northern Ireland Under 21 National Team ===
Player	Fixture	Date	Location	Event
JJ McKiernan	vs. France	28 March 2022	Paris, France	Friendly

== Awards ==
No.	Pos.	Player	Award
6	MF	Jordan Doherty	Bohemian FC Player of the Year
28	MF	James McManus	Bohemian FC Young Player of the Year
