= Tyreke Wilson =

Irish footballer (born 1999)

Personal information
- Date of birth: 2 December 1999 (age 26)
- Place of birth: Dublin, Republic of Ireland
- Position: Defender

Team information
- Current team: Dundalk

Youth career
- –2013: Cherry Orchard
- 2013–2019: Manchester City

Senior career*
Years	Team	Apps	(Gls)
2020	Waterford	18	(1)
2021–2022	Bohemians	49	(5)
2023–2026	Shelbourne	80	(1)
2026–	Dundalk	28	(4)
- * Club domestic league appearances and goals as of 17:12, 10 November 2026 (UTC)

Tyreke Wilson (born 2 December 1999) is a Republic of Ireland footballer who plays as a defender for Dundalk.

== Club career ==
=== Youth career ===
As a youth player, Wilson joined the youth academy of Irish third-tier side Cherry Orchard. In 2013, he joined the youth academy of Manchester City in the English Premier League.

=== Waterford ===
Before the 2020 season, he signed for League of Ireland Premier Division club Waterford.

=== Shelbourne ===
On 18 November 2022, he signed for Shelbourne where he would play alongside his brother John Ross. His first assist of the season coming on 17 March 2023 in a 2–0 win away against Cork City.

=== Dundalk ===
On 12 February 2026, it was announced that Wilson had signed for newly promoted League of Ireland Premier Division club Dundalk, where he would play alongside his brother John Ross.

== Personal life ==
Wilson is the brother of footballer John Ross Wilson and the son of footballer Karl Wilson.

== Career statistics ==
As of match played 30 October 2026

Appearances and goals by club, season and competition
Club	Season	League			National Cup		Europe		Other		Total	
Club	Season	Division	Apps	Goals	Apps	Goals	Apps	Goals	Apps	Goals	Apps	Goals
Manchester City U21	2017-18	—			—		—		2 (Note: Appearance(s) in the EFL Trophy)	0	2	0
Manchester City U21	2018-19	—			—		—		1	0	1	0
Manchester City U21	2019-20	—			—		—		1	0	1	0
Manchester City U21	Total		—		—		—		4	0	4	0
Waterford	2020	LOI Premier Division	18	1	1	0	—		—		19	1
Bohemians	2021	LOI Premier Division	24	4	2	0	3 (Note: Appearances in the UEFA Europa Conference League)	0	—		29	4
Bohemians	2022	LOI Premier Division	25	1	2	0	—		—		27	1
Bohemians	Total		49	5	4	0	3	0	—		56	5
Shelbourne	2023	LOI Premier Division	33	0	0	0	—		0	0	33	0
Shelbourne	2024	LOI Premier Division	34	1	2	0	4 (Note: Appearances in the UEFA Conference League)	0	0	0	40	1
Shelbourne	2025	LOI Premier Division	13	0	0	0	4 (Note: Appearances in UEFA Champions League; 1 appearance in the UEFA Conference League)	0	0	0	17	0
Shelbourne	2026	LOI Premier Division	0	0	—		—		0	0	0	0
Shelbourne	Total		80	1	2	0	8	0	0	0	90	1
Dundalk	2026	LOI Premier Division	28	4	1	0	—		0	0	29	4
Career total			175	11	8	0	11	0	4	0	198	11

== Honours ==
Shelbourne

- League of Ireland Premier Division: 2024
