= Thomas Oluwa =

Irish footballer (born 2001)

Personal information
- Date of birth: 6 February 2001 (age 25)
- Place of birth: Dublin, Ireland
- Position: Forward

Team information
- Current team: Drogheda United
- Number: 11

Youth career
- –2018: Crumlin United
- 2018–2020: Shamrock Rovers

Senior career*
Years	Team	Apps	(Gls)
2019–2020	Shamrock Rovers	8	(1)
2020	→ Shamrock Rovers II (loan)	12	(4)
2021	Bohemians	3	(0)
2021	Galway United	3	(0)
2021–2022	Larne	6	(0)
2022	Athlone Town	32	(11)
2023	Waterford	16	(1)
2023	→ Wexford (loan)	13	(7)
2024	Wexford	34	(9)
2025–	Drogheda United	69	(6)
- * Club domestic league appearances and goals as of 18:09, 10 November 2026 (UTC)

Thomas Oluwa (born 6 February 2001) is an Irish professional footballer who plays as a forward for League of Ireland First Division club Drogheda United. His previous clubs are Shamrock Rovers, Bohemians, Galway United, Larne, Athlone Town, Waterford and Wexford.

== Career ==
=== Youth career ===
Oluwa left Crumlin United to join the academy of Shamrock Rovers in January 2018, spending 6 months with the club's under-17 team before joining up with the under-19's that summer.

=== Shamrock Rovers ===
Oluwa made his senior debut for the club on 1 April 2019, coming off the bench away to Bray Wanderers in a League of Ireland Cup tie which his side lost on penalties after a 0–0 draw at the Carlisle Grounds. He made his first appearance in European competition on 1 August 2019, replacing Greg Bolger from the bench in a 3–1 defeat after extra time away to Apollon Limassol in the UEFA Europa League. On 19 August 2019 he made his league debut for the club, replacing Aaron Greene from the bench in the 76th minute away to Waterford, before scoring his first goal at senior level in the 88th minute as his side won 5–1. He was an unused substitute in the 2019 FAI Cup final as his side defeated Dundalk on penalties at the Aviva Stadium. He made 4 league appearances for the club in 2020 on their way to winning the 2020 League of Ireland Premier Division title.

=== Bohemians ===
On 23 December 2020, Oluwa signed for Rovers' Dublin rivals Bohemians for the 2021 season. He struggled for game time with Bohs, making just 3 substitute appearances before departing the club in the summer.

=== Galway United ===
On 2 July 2021, he signed for League of Ireland First Division side Galway United. He made a total of 4 appearances in all competitions for the club before departing the following month.

=== Larne ===
Oluwa signed for NIFL Premiership club Larne on transfer deadline day, 31 August 2021. He scored his first goal for the club on 14 September 2021 in a 4–0 win over Limavady United in the Northern Ireland Football League Cup. He was part of the squad that won the 2021–22 County Antrim Shield on 11 January 2022, beating Linfield 1–0 in the final. He cancelled his contract by mutual consent on 19 January 2022.

=== Athlone Town ===
On 11 February 2022, Oluwa signed for League of Ireland First Division club Athlone Town. He made his debut for the club in the opening game of the season on 18 February 2018 in a 5–2 loss at home to Waterford. He scored his first goal of the club on 14 March 2022 in a 3–2 defeat to Cobh Ramblers at the Athlone Town Stadium. He went on to score a total of 11 goals in 33 appearances in all competitions during the season before it was announced on 9 December 2022 that he had departed the club.

=== Waterford ===
On 2 December 2022, he signed for League of Ireland First Division promotion hopefuls Waterford ahead of their 2023 season. Oluwa made his debut on 21 January 2023 in a 2–1 win over Middleton in the Munster Senior Cup, scoring an 81st-minute winner. His first league goal for the club came on 2 June 2023 in a 7–0 win over Treaty United at the RSC. With just 3 of his 17 appearances coming in the starting 11, he was allowed to leave on loan in the summer in search of more regular game time.

=== Wexford ===
Oluwa moved on loan to fellow League of Ireland First Division club Wexford on loan in July 2023. He scored in his first 2 games for the club, in a 3–0 win away to Bray Wanderers on 14 July and in a 1–0 win over Treaty United at Ferrycarrig Park on 28 July 2023. He made the move permanent ahead of the 2024 season after scoring and impressive 7 goals in 13 league appearances during his loan spell. On 8 February 2024, he scored a Hat-trick in a 4–4 draw with Shelbourne in the Leinster Senior Cup. On 13 September 2024, he scored twice in a 4–1 win over Treaty United in the FAI Cup Quarter Final. 2024 saw Oluwa reach a career best in both appearances and goals in a season, scoring 15 in 42 games.

=== Drogheda United ===
Oluwa signed for League of Ireland Premier Division club and recent FAI Cup winners Drogheda United on 20 December 2024. On 14 January 2025, he made his debut for the club in a Leinster Senior Cup tie against Shelbourne, scoring all of his side's goals in a 3–0 win. On 3 March 2025, he scored his first league goal for the club, in a 1–0 win away to his old club Bohemians at Dalymount Park. He scored 6 goals in 40 appearances in his first season with the club. On 6 November 2025, he signed a new one-year-contract with the club. He scored 5 goals in 41 appearances in all competitions in 2026, as the club was relegated following a 2–1 defeat to UCD in the Promotion/Relegation Playoff.

== Style of play ==
Although mainly used as a striker Oluwa can also play on the left wing.

== Career statistics ==
As of match played on 8 November 2026

Appearances and goals by club, season and competition
Club	Season	League			National Cup (Note: Includes FAI Cup & Irish Cup)		League Cup (Note: Includes League of Ireland Cup & Northern Ireland Football League Cup)		Europe		Other		Total	
Club	Season	Division	Apps	Goals	Apps	Goals	Apps	Goals	Apps	Goals	Apps	Goals	Apps	Goals
Shamrock Rovers	2019	LOI Premier Division	4	1	0	0	1	0	1 (Note: Apprarance(s) in the UEFA Europa League)	0	0 (Note: Appearance(s) in the Leinster Senior Cup)	0	6	1
Shamrock Rovers	2020	LOI Premier Division	4	0	1	0	–		0	0	–		5	0
Shamrock Rovers	Total		8	1	1	0	1	0	1	0	0	0	11	1
Shamrock Rovers II (loan)	2020	LOI First Division	12	4	—		—		—		—		12	4
Bohemians	2021	LOI Premier Division	3	0	—		—		—		—		3	0
Galway United	2021	LOI First Division	3	0	1	0	—		—		—		4	0
Larne	2021–22	NIFL Premiership	6	0	0	0	1	1	—		2 (Note: Appearance(s) in the County Antrim Shield)	0	9	1
Athlone Town	2022	LOI First Division	32	11	1	0	—		—		—		33	11
Waterford	2023	LOI First Division	16	1	—		–		—		2 (Note: Appearances in the Munster Senior Cup)	1	18	2
Wexford (loan)	2023	LOI First Division	13	7	3	0	—		—		—		16	7
Wexford	2024	LOI First Division	34	9	4	3	—		—		4 (Note: 2 appearances in the 2024 League of Ireland Promotion/Relegation Playoffs; 2 appearances, 3 goals in the Leinster Senior Cup)	3	42	15
Drogheda United	2025	LOI Premier Division	33	2	3	1	—		—		4 (Note: 1 appearance in the President of Ireland's Cup; 3 appearances, 3 goals in the Leinster Senior Cup)	3	40	6
Drogheda United	2026	LOI Premier Division	36	4	2	1	—		—		3 (Note: 1 appearance in the 2026 League of Ireland play-offs; 2 appearances in the Leimster Senior Cup)	0	41	5
Drogheda United	Total		69	6	5	2	—		—		7	3	81	11
Career Total			197	39	15	5	2	1	1	0	15	7	229	52
