= Jamie Mullins =

Irish footballer (born 2004)

- Mullins with Wycombe Wanderers in 2026

Personal information
- Full name: Jamie Anthony Mullins
- Date of birth: 29 September 2004 (age 22)
- Place of birth: Ireland
- Height: 1.71 m (5 ft 7 in)
- Position: Midfielder

Team information
- Current team: Wycombe Wanderers
- Number: 21

Youth career
- 2010–2019: St. Kevin's
- 2019–2021: Bohemians

Senior career*
Years	Team	Apps	(Gls)
2021–2023	Bohemians	28	(2)
2023–2025	Brighton & Hove Albion	0	(0)
2025–	Wycombe Wanderers	37	(3)

International career^{‡}
2018–2019	Republic of Ireland U15	4	(0)
2019–2020	Republic of Ireland U16	4	(2)
2021	Republic of Ireland U18	2	(0)
2021–2022	Republic of Ireland U19	4	(1)
2024–2026	Republic of Ireland U21	20	(4)
- * Club domestic league appearances and goals as of 11 October 2026 (UTC) ‡ National team caps and goals as of 00:04, 18 November 2026 (UTC)

Jamie Anthony Mullins (born 29 September 2004) is an Irish footballer who plays as a midfielder for EFL League One club Wycombe Wanderers.

== Club career ==
=== Bohemians ===
Mullins began playing for St Kevin's Boys aged five and came through their youth academy. He joined Bohemians in 2019 as a member of their U15s squad but was promoted to the U17s the same year. He started training with the first team at the age of fourteen and signed for the Bohemians first-team in 2021. Mullins scored on his debut for Bohs against Longford Town in July 2021, aged just 16 years-old, making him the youngest ever goalscorer for the club in the League of Ireland. He also made his UEFA Conference League debut for the club against Stjarnan at the Aviva Stadium in July 2021.

=== Brighton & Hove Albion ===
Mullins signed for the youth academy of Brighton & Hove Albion from Bohemians in January 2023 for an undisclosed fee, signing a two-and-a-half-year contract, until 2025. The first-team pathway granted to Evan Ferguson, who also made the switch from Bohemians to Brighton, was said to be a factor in the decision to move. On 9 June 2025, Mullins extended his contract with Brighton until 30 June 2026.

=== Wycombe Wanderers ===
On 15 July 2025, Mullins signed for EFL League One club Wycombe Wanderers for an undisclosed fee.

== International career ==
A former Republic of Ireland U15, U16, U18 and U19 international, Mullins received his first call up to the Republic of Ireland U21 squad in November 2024, for their two friendlies against Sweden U21 in Marbella, Spain. He made his debut in a 2–0 defeat to Sweden on 14 November 2024. Mullins was named Republic of Ireland Men's Under-21 International Player of the Year for 2026.

== Career statistics ==
As of match played on 14 March 2026

Appearances and goals by club, season and competition
Club	Season	League			National cup (Note: Includes FAI Cup & FA Cup)		League cup (Note: Includes National League Cup & EFL Cup)		Other		Total	
Club	Season	Division	Apps	Goals	Apps	Goals	Apps	Goals	Apps	Goals	Apps	Goals
Bohemians	2021	LOI Premier Division	11	2	2	1	—		1 (Note: Appearance in the UEFA Europa Conference League)	0	14	3
Bohemians	2022	LOI Premier Division	17	0	1	0	—		—		18	0
Bohemians	Total		28	2	3	1	–		1	0	32	3
Brighton & Hove Albion U21s	2023–24	—							6 (Note: Appearances in the EFL Trophy)	0	6	0
Brighton & Hove Albion U21s	2024–25	—					5	0	—		5	0
Brighton & Hove Albion U21s	Total		–				5	0	6	0	11	0
Wycombe Wanderers	2025–26	EFL League One	29	3	2	0	1	0	0	0	32	3
Career total			57	5	5	1	6	0	7	0	75	6
