= James Finnerty =

Irish association footballer (born 1999)

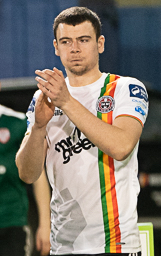
- Finnerty in 2019

Personal information
- Date of birth: 1 February 1999 (age 27)
- Place of birth: Skryne, Ireland
- Position: Defender

Youth career
- Belvedere
- 2015–2018: Aston Villa

Senior career*
Years	Team	Apps	(Gls)
2018	Rochdale	0	(0)
2019–2022	Bohemians	64	(2)
2022	→ Galway United (loan)	11	(0)
2023	Sligo Rovers	2	(0)

International career
- Republic of Ireland U17
- Republic of Ireland U18
- Republic of Ireland U19
- * Club domestic league appearances and goals as of 14:51, 25 August 2023 (UTC)

James Finnerty (born 1 February 1999) is an Irish professional footballer who plays as a defender. His former clubs include Rochdale, Bohemians, Galway United and Sligo Rovers.

== Club career ==
Born in Skryne, Finnerty signed for English Aston Villa from Irish club Belvedere in 2015. He signed a two-year contract with Rochdale in May 2018. After one senior appearance in the EFL Trophy, in December 2018 it was announced that Finnerty would sign for Bohemians for the 2019 season. Finnerty later said that part of the reason for leaving Rochdale was due to homesickness. In April 2019 he scored an "incredible" goal by way of an overhead kick. In March 2021 he was described as "a solid defender at the heart of the Bohemians defence". On 3 July 2022, it was announced that Finnerty had signed for Galway United on loan until the end of the season. Finnerty signed for Sligo Rovers ahead of the 2023 season. On 25 August 2023, it was announced that he had departed the club by mutual consent, after making just two appearances following injury trouble.

== International career ==
He has represented the Republic of Ireland at under-17, under-18 and under-19 youth levels.

== Personal life ==
Finnery attended St Patrick's Classical School in Navan. His father Padraig was a Gaelic football player. Finnerty also played Gaelic football as a youth, as did his younger brother.

== Career statistics ==
As of match played on 28 July 2023

Appearances and goals by club, season and competition
Club	Season	League			National cup (Note: Includes FA Cup, FAI Cup)		League cup (Note: Includes League of Ireland Cup, EFL Cup)		Other		Total	
Club	Season	Division	Apps	Goals	Apps	Goals	Apps	Goals	Apps	Goals	Apps	Goals
Rochdale	2018–19	EFL League Two	0	0	0	0	0	0	1 (Note: Appearance in the EFL Trophy)	0	1	0
Bohemians	2019	LOI Premier Division	31	2	2	0	1	0	0	0	34	2
Bohemians	2020	LOI Premier Division	5	0	1	0	—		1 (Note: Appearance in the UEFA Europa League)	0	7	0
Bohemians	2021	LOI Premier Division	21	0	2	0	—		4 (Note: Appearances in the UEFA Europa Conference League)	0	27	0
Bohemians	2022	LOI Premier Division	7	0	—		—		—		7	0
Bohemians	Total		64	2	5	0	1	0	5	0	75	2
Galway United (loan)	2022	LOI First Division	11	0	2	0	—		3 (Note: Appearances in 2022 League of Ireland promotion/relegation playoffs)	0	16	0
Sligo Rovers	2023	LOI Premier Division	2	0	0	0	—		—		2	0
Career Total			77	2	7	0	1	0	9	0	94	2
