= Liam Burt =

Scottish footballer (born 1999)

Personal information
- Date of birth: 1 February 1999 (age 27)
- Place of birth: Glasgow, Scotland
- Height: 5 ft 8 in (1.73 m)
- Position: Midfielder

Team information
- Current team: Glentoran
- Number: 17

Youth career
- Celtic
- 2014–2017: Rangers

Senior career*
Years	Team	Apps	(Gls)
2016–2019	Rangers	3	(0)
2018	→ Dumbarton (loan)	13	(2)
2018–2019	→ Alloa Athletic (loan)	9	(0)
2019–2020	Celtic	0	(0)
2021–2022	Bohemians	62	(15)
2023–2025	Shamrock Rovers	16	(1)
2024	→ Shelbourne (loan)	31	(2)
2025–	Glentoran	29	(2)

International career^{‡}
2014	Scotland U16	3	(0)
2015–2016	Scotland U17	13	(1)
2015–2017	Scotland U19	4	(0)
2016–2018	Scotland U21	5	(0)
- * Club domestic league appearances and goals as of 29 April 2026 ‡ National team caps and goals as of 20:23, 1 July 2018 (UTC)

Liam Burt (born 1 February 1999) is a Scottish footballer who plays as a midfielder for NIFL Premiership club Glentoran.

He made his first team debut for Rangers in March 2016, and also played on loan for Dumbarton and Alloa Athletic. He then moved to Celtic where he did not make a first team appearance before moving to Ireland with Bohemians in 2021. Burt represented Scotland at various youth levels up to under-21 level.

== Club career ==
Burt played youth football at Celtic as a boy before being released and subsequently joining the Rangers Academy. He made his professional debut for the club aged 17 during a Scottish Championship match against Raith Rovers on 1 March 2016. A few days later, Burt signed a new two-year contract extension keeping him at Ibrox until May 2018.

He made his first appearance of the 2016–17 season, and his first Scottish top-flight appearance, as an injury time substitute on 10 December 2016 in a 2–0 home win against Heart of Midlothian. In January 2017, he was named as one of the Daily Record's and The Herald's Scottish football prospects for 2017.

Burt joined Scottish Championship side Dumbarton on a 28-day emergency loan in February 2018. He extended the deal in March 2018, scoring his first goal in senior football for the club in a 5-2 defeat to Falkirk. Burt was loaned to Championship club Alloa Athletic in August 2018. On 17 May 2019, it was announced that Burt would be released by Rangers.

In August 2019, he signed a two-year contract with Celtic. He left Celtic in 2020.

In February 2021, he was unveiled as a new signing for Bohemians ahead of the 2021 League of Ireland season. He scored 1 goal and set up Georgie Kelly for 2 goals to help Bohemians win 3-0 against Stjarnan in the second round of the Europa Conference League qualifiers . Burt was named in the 2021 PFAI Team of the Year at the conclusion of the season.

On 2 December 2022, it was announced that Burt had signed for Bohemians arch rivals Shamrock Rovers ahead of the 2023 season.

After a disappointing first season with Rovers, it was announced on 22 December 2023, that Burt had signed a season long loan deal with Shelbourne.

Having returned to Rovers at the end of his loan spell, it was announced on 20 February 2025 that his contract had been terminated by mutual consent. In February 2025 Burt posted to his social media account a copy of angry messages he sent to his former manager and management team in Shamrock Rovers. The club released a statement the following day claiming that Burt's claims were "untrue and false accusations". The club were also looking to seek further action against the former player due to the upset caused before an important league fixture.

On 30 April 2025, it was announced that Burt had signed a 2 year contract, with the option of a third year, with NIFL Premiership club Glentoran.

== International career ==
Burt has represented Scotland at various age levels. He captained Scotland at the 2016 UEFA European Under-17 Championship.

Selected for the Scotland under-21 squad in the 2018 Toulon Tournament, the team lost to Turkey in a penalty-out and finished fourth.

== Career statistics ==
As of match played on 21 November 2025

Appearances and goals by club, season and competition
Club	Season	League			National Cup (Note: Includes Scottish Cup, FAI Cup & Irish Cup)		League Cup (Note: Includes Scottish League Cup & Northern Ireland Football League Cup)		Europe		Other		Total	
Club	Season	Division	Apps	Goals	Apps	Goals	Apps	Goals	Apps	Goals	Apps	Goals	Apps	Goals
Rangers	2015–16	Scottish Championship	2	0	0	0	0	0	—		0	0	2	0
Rangers	2016–17	Scottish Premiership	1	0	0	0	0	0	—		—		1	0
Rangers	2017–18	Scottish Premiership	0	0	0	0	0	0	0	0	—		0	0
Rangers	2018–19	Scottish Premiership	0	0	0	0	0	0	0	0	—		0	0
Rangers	Total		3	0	0	0	0	0	0	0	0	0	3	0
Rangers U20	2016–17	SPFL Development League	—		—		—		—		2 (Note: Appearances in the Scottish Challenge Cup.)	1	2	1
Rangers U20	2018–19	SPFL Reserve League	—		—		—		—		1	0	1	0
Rangers U20	Total		0	0	0	0	0	0	0	0	3	1	3	1
Dumbarton (loan)	2017–18	Scottish Championship	13	1	0	0	0	0	—		6 (Note: 2 appearances in the Scottish Challenge Cup; 4 appearances in the Championship/League One play-offs.)	0	19	1
Alloa Athletic (loan)	2018–19	Scottish Championship	9	0	1	0	0	0	—		0	0	10	0
Celtic	2019–20	Scottish Premiership	0	0	0	0	0	0	0	0	—		0	0
Celtic U21	2019–20	–	—		—		—		—		2	0	2	0
Bohemians	2021	LOI Premier Division	34	9	3	0	—		6 (Note: Appearances in the UEFA Europa Conference League.)	1	—		43	10
Bohemians	2022	LOI Premier Division	28	6	3	1	—		—		—		31	7
Bohemians	Total		62	15	6	1	—		6	1	—		74	17
Shamrock Rovers	2023	LOI Premier Division	16	1	1	0	—		2	0	2 (Note: Appearances in the Leinster Senior Cup)	0	21	1
Shamrock Rovers	2024	LOI Premier Division	0	0	—		—		—		—		0	0
Shamrock Rovers	2025	LOI Premier Division	0	0	—		—		0 (Note: Appearances in the UEFA Conference League)	0	0	0	0	0
Shamrock Rovers	Total		16	1	1	0	—		2	0	2	0	21	1
Shelbourne (loan)	2024	LOI Premier Division	31	2	2	0	—		2	0	0	0	35	2
Glentoran	2025–26	NIFL Premiership	13	0	0	0	2	0	—		2 (Note: Appearances in the County Antrim Shield)	0	17	0
Career total			147	19	10	1	2	0	10	1	15	1	184	21

== Honours ==
Shamrock Rovers

- League of Ireland Premier Division: 2023

Shelbourne

- League of Ireland Premier Division: 2024
