= Jules Diouf =

French footballer (born 1992)

Personal information
- Date of birth: 5 March 1992 (age 34)
- Place of birth: Neuilly-sur-Seine, France
- Height: 1.86 m (6 ft 1 in)
- Position: Defender

Team information
- Current team: F91 Dudelange
- Number: 5

Youth career
- –2012: Toulouse

Senior career*
Years	Team	Apps	(Gls)
2009–2012	Toulouse B	27	(2)
2013	Boulogne B	5	(1)
2013–2014	Angoulême CFC	23	(3)
2014–2015	CR Al Hoceima	11	(0)
2016	Mafra	14	(3)
2016–2018	Penafiel	43	(3)
2019–2020	Union Titus Pétange	24	(1)
2020–	F91 Dudelange	68	(5)
- * Club domestic league appearances and goals as of 16 June 2023

Jules Diouf (born 5 March 1992) is a French professional footballer who plays as a defender for F91 Dudelange in Luxembourg.

== Career ==
Diouf made his debut for Mafra on 21 February 2016 against Leixões in a 1–0 win, playing 90 minutes and scoring one goal.

In June 2016, Diouf signed for Penafiel.

== Personal life ==
Diouf is of Senegalese descent.
