= Keith Ward (footballer) =

Irish footballer

Personal information
- Date of birth: 12 October 1990 (age 36)
- Place of birth: Dublin, Ireland
- Position: Midfielder

Youth career
- Bohemians

Senior career*
Years	Team	Apps	(Gls)
2008–2010	UCD	52	(4)
2011	Dundalk	33	(3)
2012	Bohemians	24	(4)
2013–2014	Dundalk	18	(1)
2015	Sligo Rovers	17	(1)
2016	Derry City	19	(1)
2017–2021	Bohemians	130	(9)
2022–2023	Dundalk	52	(6)
2024	Shelbourne	2	(0)
2024–2025	Glenavon	16	(2)
2025	Dundalk	33	(4)
- * Club domestic league appearances and goals as of 22:03, 5 January 2026 (UTC)

Keith Ward (born 12 October 1990) is an Irish former footballer.

== Career ==
Ward began his professional career at UCD before moving to Dundalk for the first of three spells with the Lilywhites.

He made his debut for Bohemians in 2012. Ward moved on from Bohemians to have spells at Sligo Rovers and Derry City respectively, before returning to Bohs for the 2017 season.

Ward joined a select number of Bohemians players when he scored in an away tie in European competition against Hungarian side Fehérvár during Bohs' UEFA Europa League qualifier in 2020. Bohemians were eventually knocked out on penalties.

Ward signed for Dundalk, in December 2021, with his deal effective from January 2022, when his contract at Bohemians expired.

In November 2023 it was announced that Ward would be joining Shelbourne, following 2 seasons at Dundalk. On 23 July 2024, it was announced that he had departed the club by mutual consent after making 2 appearances.

On 1 August 2024, NIFL Premiership club Glenavon announced they had signed Ward, following the dissolution of his contract with Shelbourne.

On 16 January 2025, Ward signed for League of Ireland First Division club Dundalk, for his 4th spell with the club. After the 2025 season, he retired from football and joined the coaching staff at the club.

== Honours ==
Dundalk

- League of Ireland Premier Division: 2014
- League of Ireland Cup: 2014
- League of Ireland First Division: 2025
- Leinster Senior Cup: 2024–25
