= Neil Doyle =

Irish international referee (born 1978)

- Full name: Neil Anthony Doyle
- Born: 29 April 1978 (age 48); Dundrum, Dublin Ireland

Domestic
Years	League	Role

International
Years	League	Role
2011–2026	FIFA listed	Referee

Neil Anthony Doyle (born 29 April 1978) is an Irish former international referee who refereed at the 2014 & 2018 FIFA World Cup qualifiers. He refereed the 2012 FAI Cup Final & 2018 FAI Cup Final. Doyle retired from League of Ireland refereeing in August 2026.
