= 2019 Bohemian F.C. season =

Irish football club season

Bohemian F.C.
2019 season
- Manager: Keith Long
- Stadium: Dalymount Park, Phibsborough, Dublin 7
- Premier Division: 3rd
- FAI Cup: Semi-final (vs. Shamrock Rovers)
- EA Sports Cup: Semi-final (vs. Dundalk)
- Leinster Senior Cup: Semi-final (withdrew from competition)
- Scottish Challenge Cup: Third round (vs. Airdrieonians)
- Top goalscorer: League: Danny Mandroiu (11); All: Danny Mandroiu (14)
- Highest home attendance: 3,634 (vs. St Patrick's Athletic, 29 March 2019, Premier Division)
- Lowest home attendance: 250 (vs. North End United, 14 October 2019, Leinster Senior Cup)
- Average home league attendance: 2,856
- Biggest win: 10–1 (vs. UCD, 16 August 2019, Premier Division)
- Biggest defeat: 1–6 (vs. Dundalk, 19 August 2019, EA Sports Cup)
Home colours	Away colours

The 2019 League of Ireland season was Bohemian Football Club's 129th year in their history and their 35th consecutive season in the League of Ireland Premier Division since it became the top tier of Irish football. Bohemians participated in various domestic cups this season, including the FAI Cup, EA Sports Cup and the Leinster Senior Cup. Bohemians also competed in the Scottish Challenge Cup.

On 19 December 2018 the fixtures were announced with Bohs down to play newly promoted Finn Harps on the opening day of the season.

Bohemians successfully sold out their home ticket allocation for the first eight matches of the season with average crowds at Dalymount Park up exponentially on seasons prior. They would go on to sell out the Jodi stand five more times in Dalymount, including a capacity crowd for a mid-season friendly against Chelsea, bringing the total number of sell outs up to fourteen.

Bohemians secured European football for the first time in seven years on the penultimate day of the season and would finish in third place. The club advanced to the semi-final stage of all three domestic cup competitions. Bohs long-serving captain Derek Pender retired on the last day of the season against Sligo Rovers and marked the occasion with a goal from the penalty spot.

== Club ==
=== Kits ===
The club's traditional red and black stripes were provided by O'Neills this season. The deal with previous kit manufacturer Hummel ended after the 2018 campaign.

Bohemians away jersey for the 2019 campaign sparked international media attention, as it paid tribute to one of the most famous musicians to have played at Dalymount Park - Bob Marley. Due to image rights issues, Bohemians were forced to remove the singer's face from the jersey. The redesign showed a clenched fist as "a symbol of solidarity and support used to express unity, strength and resistance".

Supplier: O'Neills / Sponsor: Mr Green

=== Management team ===
Position	Name
Head coach	(Republic of Ireland) Keith Long
Assistant head coach	(Republic of Ireland) Trevor Croly
Assistant coaches	(England) Remy Tang (Strength & Conditioning)
Assistant coaches	(Republic of Ireland) Rob Murray (Fitness)
Goalkeeper coach	(Scotland) Chris Bennion

== Squad ==
No.	Player	Nat.	Pos.	Date of birth (age)	Since	Ends	Last club
Goalkeepers
1	James Talbot	(Republic of Ireland)	GK	24 April 1997 (age 29)	2019	2020	(England) Sunderland U23
25	Sean Bohan	(Republic of Ireland)	GK	12 March 2001 (age 25)	2018	2019	(Republic of Ireland) Bohemians U19
31	Michael Kelly	(Republic of Ireland)	GK	13 July 1996 (age 30)	2019	2019	(Republic of Ireland) Longford Town
99	Jamie Cleary	(Republic of Ireland)	GK	12 October 2001 (age 24)	2019	2019	(Republic of Ireland) Bohemians U19
Defenders
2	Derek Pender (C)	(Republic of Ireland)	RB	2 October 1984 (age 41)	2012	2019	(Republic of Ireland) St Patrick's Athletic
3	Darragh Leahy	(Republic of Ireland)	LB	15 April 1998 (age 28)	2018	2019	(England) Coventry City
4	Aaron Barry	(Republic of Ireland)	CB	24 November 1992 (age 33)	2019	2019	(Republic of Ireland) Cork City
5	Rob Cornwall	(Republic of Ireland)	CB	16 October 1994 (age 31)	2017	2020	(Republic of Ireland) Shamrock Rovers
18	James Finnerty	(Republic of Ireland)	CB	1 February 1999 (age 27)	2019	2020	(England) Rochdale
19	Andy Lyons	(Republic of Ireland)	RB	2 August 2000 (age 25)	2018	2020	(Republic of Ireland) Bohemians U19
22	Paddy Kirk	(Republic of Ireland)	LB	2 June 1998 (age 28)	2018	2019	(Republic of Ireland) Bohemians U19
23	Michael Barker	(Republic of Ireland)	RB	16 August 1993 (age 32)	2019	2019	(Republic of Ireland) St Patrick's Athletic
Midfielders
6	Scott Allardice	(Scotland)	CM	31 March 1998 (age 28)	2019	2019	(Scotland) Dundee United
7	Danny Mandroiu	(Republic of Ireland)	AM	20 October 1998 (age 27)	2019	2020	(England) Brighton & Hove Albion U23
10	Keith Ward	(Republic of Ireland)	AM	12 October 1990 (age 35)	2017	2020	(Republic of Ireland) Derry City
11	Kevin Devaney	(Republic of Ireland)	LW	26 September 1990 (age 35)	2018	2019	(Republic of Ireland) Galway United
12	Daniel Grant	(Republic of Ireland)	RW	23 December 2000 (age 25)	2018	2020	(Republic of Ireland) Bohemians U19
14	Conor Levingston	(Republic of Ireland)	CM	21 January 1998 (age 28)	2019	2020	(England) Wolverhampton Wanderers U23
16	Keith Buckley	(Republic of Ireland)	CM	17 June 1992 (age 34)	2018	2020	(Republic of Ireland) Bray Wanderers
17	Ryan Graydon	(Republic of Ireland)	LW	11 April 1999 (age 27)	2018	2019	(Republic of Ireland) Bohemians U19
26	Ross Tierney	(Republic of Ireland)	AM	6 March 2001 (age 25)	2019	2020	(Republic of Ireland) Bohemians U19
27	Luke Wade-Slater	(Republic of Ireland)	RW	2 March 1998 (age 28)	2019	2020	(England) Stevenage
28	Katlego Mashigo	(South Africa)	CM	26 January 2001 (age 25)	2019	2019	(Republic of Ireland) Bohemians U19
30	Dawson Devoy	(Republic of Ireland)	AM	20 November 2001 (age 24)	2019	2020	(Republic of Ireland) Bohemians U19
32	Alex Kelly	(Republic of Ireland)	CM	10 February 2001 (age 25)	2019	2019	(Republic of Ireland) Bohemians U19
33	Marlon Marishta	(Albania)	LW	11 June 2001 (age 25)	2019	2019	(Republic of Ireland) Bohemians U19
Forwards
9	Daniel Corcoran	(Republic of Ireland)	CF	13 February 1989 (age 37)	2017	2020	(Republic of Ireland) St Patrick's Athletic
15	Andre Wright	(England)	CF	7 December 1996 (age 29)	2019	2020	(England) Torquay United
20	Cristian Magerusan	(Romania)	FW	16 September 1999 (age 26)	2018	2020	(Republic of Ireland) Bohemians U19
24	Ryan Swan	(Republic of Ireland)	FW	13 May 1996 (age 30)	2018	2019	(Republic of Ireland) Cabinteely
29	Evan Ferguson	(Republic of Ireland)	FW	13 October 2004 (age 21)	2019	2019	(Republic of Ireland) Bohemians U17

== Statistics ==
=== Appearances and goals ===
Number in brackets represents appearances of which were substituted ON.

No.	Pos.	Player	Premier Division		FAI Cup		EA Sports Cup		Leinster Senior Cup		Scottish Challenge Cup		Total	
No.	Pos.	Player	Apps	Goals	Apps	Goals	Apps	Goals	Apps	Goals	Apps	Goals	Apps	Goals
1	GK	(Republic of Ireland) James Talbot	36	0	4	0	1	0	0	0	0	0	41	0
2	DF	(Republic of Ireland) Derek Pender	24	2	2	0	1	0	0	0	0	0	27	2
3	DF	(Republic of Ireland) Darragh Leahy	25 (1)	2	0	0	1	0	0	0	0	0	27 (1)	0
4	DF	(Republic of Ireland) Aaron Barry	19 (5)	0	1	0	2	0	1	2	1	0	24 (5)	2
5	DF	(Republic of Ireland) Rob Cornwall	17	0	3	0	0	0	0	0	0	0	20	0
6	MF	(Scotland) Scott Allardice	18 (8)	0	1	0	3 (1)	0	1	0	1	1	25 (9)	1
7	MF	(Republic of Ireland) Danny Mandroiu	29 (2)	11	3	2	3 (1)	1	0	0	0	0	35 (3)	14
9	FW	(Republic of Ireland) Daniel Corcoran	16 (1)	7	0	0	0	0	0	0	0	0	16 (1)	7
10	MF	(Republic of Ireland) Keith Ward	29 (8)	1	3 (3)	0	2 (1)	0	0	0	1	0	35 (12)	1
11	MF	(Republic of Ireland) Kevin Devaney	15	1	0	0	1	0	0	0	0	0	16	1
12	MF	(Republic of Ireland) Danny Grant	24 (6)	4	4	0	0	0	1	1	0	0	29 (6)	5
14	MF	(Republic of Ireland) Conor Levingston	30 (2)	4	3 (1)	0	0	0	0	0	0	0	33 (3)	4
15	FW	(England) Andre Wright	10	5	4	2	1	0	0	0	1 (1)	0	16 (1)	7
16	MF	(Republic of Ireland) Keith Buckley	24 (1)	1	3	1	1	0	0	0	0	0	28 (1)	2
17	MF	(Republic of Ireland) Ryan Graydon	13 (9)	0	2	0	2	1	2	2	1	0	19 (9)	3
18	DF	(Republic of Ireland) James Finnerty	31	2	4	0	1	0	0	0	0	0	36	2
19	DF	(Republic of Ireland) Andy Lyons	14 (3)	0	3	1	2 (1)	0	1	0	1	0	21 (4)	1
20	FW	(Romania) Cristian Magerusan	0	0	0	0	0	0	0	0	0	0	0	0
22	DF	(Republic of Ireland) Patrick Kirk	15 (2)	0	3 (1)	0	3	0	1	0	1	0	23 (3)	0
23	DF	(Republic of Ireland) Michael Barker	13 (2)	1	1 (1)	0	3	0	2	0	1	0	20 (3)	1
24	FW	(Republic of Ireland) Ryan Swan	20 (10)	4	1( 1)	0	2	0	2	0	1	0	24 (11)	4
25	GK	(Republic of Ireland) Sean Bohan	0	0	0	0	1	0	0	0	0	0	1	0
26	MF	(Republic of Ireland) Ross Tierney	8 (3)	1	4 (3)	0	2	2	1 (1)	0	1 (1)	0	16 (7)	4
27	MF	(Republic of Ireland) Luke Wade-Slater	28 (6)	1	3 (1)	0	2	0	0	0	1	1	34 (7)	2
28	MF	(South Africa) Katlego Mashigo	0	0	0	0	0	0	1	0	0	0	1	0
29	FW	(Republic of Ireland) Evan Ferguson	1 (1)	0	0	0	0	0	0	0	0	0	1 (1)	0
30	MF	(Republic of Ireland) Dawson Devoy	6 (5)	0	1	0	1 (1)	0	1 (1)	0	1 (1)	0	10 (8)	0
31	GK	(Republic of Ireland) Michael Kelly	0	0	0	0	1	0	2	0	1	0	3	0
32	DF	(Republic of Ireland) Alex Kelly	0	0	0	0	0	0	1 (1)	0	0	0	1 (1)	0
33	MF	(Albania) Marlon Marishta	0	0	0	0	0	0	1 (1)	1	0	0	1 (1)	1
—	DF	(Ivory Coast) Peter Adigun	0	0	0	0	0	0	1	0	0	0	1	0
—	DF	(Republic of Ireland) Mitch Byrne	0	0	0	0	0	0	1	0	0	0	1	0
—	DF	(Republic of Ireland) Jack Funge	0	0	0	0	0	0	1	0	0	0	1	0
—	MF	(Republic of Ireland) Gavin Molloy	0	0	0	0	0	0	1	0	0	0	1	0
—	FW	(Northern Ireland) Brandon Bermingham	0	0	0	0	0	0	1	0	0	0	1	0
—	MF	(Republic of Ireland) Jack Moylan	0	0	0	0	0	0	1	0	0	0	1	0
—	DF	(Republic of Ireland) Jack Casey	0	0	0	0	0	0	1 (1)	0	0	0	1 (1)	0
—	MF	(Republic of Ireland) Mickey O'Keane	0	0	0	0	0	0	1 (1)	0	0	0	1 (1)	0
Players left club during season
8	MF	(Republic of Ireland) Robbie McCourt	14 (8)	0	0	0	3 (1)	0	1	0	1	0	20 (9)	0
21	GK	(Republic of Ireland) Niall Corbet	0	0	0	0	0	0	1	0	0	0	1	0
15	FW	(Republic of Ireland) Sam Byrne	5 (5)	0	0	0	2	1	1	0	0	0	8 (5)	1
28	FW	(Republic of Ireland) Ali Reghba	11 (8)	0	0	0	1 (1)	0	0	0	0	0	12 (9)	0
21	MF	(Republic of Ireland) Dylan Thornton	0	0	0	0	1 (1)	0	0	0	0	0	1 (1)	0

=== Top scorers ===
Includes all competitive matches. Last updated 26 October 2019

Number	Name	SSE Airtricity League	FAI Cup	EA Sports Cup	Leinster Senior Cup	Scottish Challenge Cup	Total
7	Danny Mandroiu	11	2	1	0	0	14
9	Dinny Corcoran	7	0	0	0	0	7
15	Andre Wright	5	2	0	0	0	7
12	Daniel Grant	4	0	0	1	0	5
24	Ryan Swan	4	0	0	0	0	4
14	Conor Levingston	4	0	0	0	0	4
26	Ross Tierney	2	0	2	0	0	4
17	Ryan Graydon	0	0	1	2	0	3
4	Aaron Barry	0	0	0	2	0	2
18	James Finnerty	2	0	0	0	0	2
2	Derek Pender	2	0	0	0	0	2
16	Keith Buckley	1	1	0	0	0	2
27	Luke Wade-Slater	1	0	0	0	1	2
11	Kevin Devaney	1	0	0	0	0	1
10	Keith Ward	1	0	0	0	0	1
23	Michael Barker	1	0	0	0	0	1
6	Scott Allardice	0	0	0	0	1	1
19	Andy Lyons	0	1	0	0	0	1
33	Marlon Marishta	0	0	0	1	0	1
Own goals		1	0	0	1	0	2
Player(s) left club during season
15	Sam Byrne	0	0	1	0	0	1

=== Hat tricks ===
Includes all competitive matches. Last updated 26 October 2019

Player	Against	Result	Date	Competition
(England) Andre Wright	UCD	10–1 (H)	16 August 2019	Premier Division
(Republic of Ireland) Danny Mandroiu	UCD	10–1 (H)	16 August 2019	Premier Division

(H) – Home; (A) – Away

=== Clean sheets ===
Includes all competitive matches. Last updated 26 October 2019

Number	Name	SSE Airtricity League	FAI Cup	EA Sports Cup	Leinster Senior Cup	Scottish Challenge Cup	Total
1	James Talbot	17/36	1/4	1/1	0/0	0/0	19/41
31	Michael Kelly	0/0	0/0	0/1	0/1	0/1	0/3
25	Sean Bohan	0/0	0/0	0/1	0/0	0/0	0/1
Player(s) left club during season
21	Niall Corbet	0/0	0/0	0/0	0/1	0/0	0/1

=== Disciplinary record ===
Includes all competitive matches. Last updated 26 October 2019

Number	Name	SSE Airtricity League		FAI Cup		EA Sports Cup		Leinster Senior Cup		Scottish Challenge Cup		Total	
Number	Name	Booked	Sent off (straight red)	Booked	Sent off (straight red)	Booked	Sent off (straight red)	Booked	Sent off (straight red)	Booked	Sent off (straight red)	Booked	Sent off (straight red)
7	Danny Mandroiu	5	0	1	1	1	0	0	0	0	0	7	1
22	Paddy Kirk	9	0	0	0	0	0	0	0	0	0	9	0
2	Derek Pender	6	1	0	0	0	0	0	0	0	0	6	1
18	James Finnerty	5	1	1	0	0	0	0	0	0	0	6	1
14	Conor Levingston	6	0	0	0	0	0	0	0	0	0	6	0
1	James Talbot	4	0	1	0	0	0	0	0	0	0	5	0
23	Michael Barker	4	0	0	0	0	0	0	0	0	0	4	0
5	Robert Cornwall	2	1	0	0	0	0	0	0	0	0	2	1
6	Scott Allardice	2	0	0	0	0	0	1	0	0	0	3	0
19	Andy Lyons	2	0	0	0	0	0	0	0	0	0	2	0
3	Darragh Leahy	2	0	0	0	0	0	0	0	0	0	2	0
17	Ryan Graydon	0	1	0	0	0	0	0	0	0	0	0	1
16	Keith Buckley	1	0	1	0	0	0	0	0	0	0	2	0
15	Andre Wright	1	0	1	0	0	0	0	0	0	0	2	0
26	Ross Tierney	1	0	0	0	1	0	0	0	0	0	2	0
12	Daniel Grant	1	0	1	0	0	0	0	0	0	0	2	0
4	Aaron Barry	1	0	0	0	0	0	0	0	0	0	1	0
9	Dinny Corcoran	1	0	0	0	0	0	0	0	0	0	1	0
Players left club during season
28	Ali Reghba	2	0	0	0	0	0	0	0	0	0	2	0
8	Robbie McCourt	1	0	0	0	0	0	1	0	0	0	2	0
Totals		53	4	6	1	1	0	2	0	0	0	62	5

=== Captains ===
No.	P	Name	Country	No. games	Notes
2	DF	Derek Pender	(Republic of Ireland)	27	Captain
16	MF	Keith Buckley	(Republic of Ireland)	8	Vice-captain
4	DF	Aaron Barry	(Republic of Ireland)	4	
22	DF	Paddy Kirk	(Republic of Ireland)	2	
23	DF	Michael Barker	(Republic of Ireland)	2	
3	DF	Darragh Leahy	(Republic of Ireland)	1	
6	MF	Scott Allardice	(Scotland)	1	
5	DF	Robert Cornwall	(Republic of Ireland)	1	

Last updated: 26 October 2019
Source: Competitive match reports.
Competitive matches only
Matches started as captain only
Country: FIFA nationality; No.: Squad number; P: Position; Name: Player name; No. Games: Number of games started as captain.

== Competitions ==
=== Overview ===
Competition	Record							
Competition	P	W	D	L	GF	GA	GD	Win %
Premier Division	36	17	9	10	47	28	+19	47.22
FAI Cup	4	2	1	1	4	7	−3	50.00
EA Sports Cup	3	2	0	1	5	7	−2	66.67
Leinster Senior Cup* (withdrew)	3	2	0	1	7	3	+4	66.67
Scottish Challenge Cup	1	0	0	1	2	3	−1	0.00
Total	47	23	10	14	65	48	+17	48.94

Updated to match played 31 December 2019
Source: Competitions

=== League of Ireland ===
==== League table ====
Pos	Team	Pld	W	D	L	GF	GA	GD	Pts	Qualification or relegation
1	Dundalk (C)	36	27	5	4	73	18	+55	86	Qualification for Champions League first qualifying round
2	Shamrock Rovers	36	23	6	7	62	21	+41	75	Qualification for Europa League first qualifying round (Note: Since the winners of the 2019 FAI Cup (Shamrock Rovers) qualified for European competition based on their league position, the final spot awarded to the Cup winner passed to the next best-placed team i.e fourth-placed team.)
3	Bohemians	36	17	9	10	47	28	+19	60	Qualification for Europa League first qualifying round
4	Derry City	36	15	12	9	56	34	+22	57	Qualification for Europa League first qualifying round
5	St Patrick's Athletic	36	14	10	12	29	35	−6	52	
6	Waterford	36	12	7	17	46	53	−7	43	
7	Sligo Rovers	36	10	12	14	38	47	−9	42	
8	Cork City	36	9	10	17	29	49	−20	37	
9	Finn Harps (O)	36	7	7	22	26	64	−38	28	Qualification for relegation play-offs
10	UCD (R)	36	5	4	27	25	82	−57	19	Relegation to League of Ireland First Division

Source: SSE Airtricity League, Soccerway
Rules for classification: 1) Points; 2) Goal difference; 3) Goals scored.
(C) Champions; (O) Play-off winners; (R) Relegated

==== Results summary ====
Overall								Home						Away					
Pld	W	D	L	GF	GA	GD	Pts	W	D	L	GF	GA	GD	W	D	L	GF	GA	GD
36	17	9	10	47	28	+19	60	11	3	4	34	15	+19	6	6	6	13	13	0

==== Results by matchday ====
Matchday	1	2	3	4	5	6	7	8	9	10	11	12	13	14	15	16	17	18	19	20	21	22	23	24	25	26	27	28	29	30	31	32	33	34	35	36
Ground	H	A	H	A	H	A	H	A	A	A	H	A	H	A	H	H	A	A	H	H	H	A	H	A	A	H	A	A	H	A	H	A	H	H	A	H
Result	W	W	W	D	D	L	W	W	W	L	W	W	D	W	L	L	D	L	L	W	W	W	D	D	L	W	D	L	W	L	L	D	W	W	D	W
Position	3	2	1	1	2	3	3	2	2	3	2	2	3	3	3	3	3	3	3	3	3	3	3	3	3	3	3	4	3	3	3	4	3	3	3	3

A = Away; H = Home; W = Win; D = Draw; L = Loss

==== Matches ====
Win Draw Loss

15 February 2019 Round 1	Bohemians	1-0	Finn Harps	Phibsborough, Dublin
19:45 GMT	Daniel Corcoran 41'; Conor Levingston (yellow card) 50'; Danny Mandroiu (yellow card) 76'	Report	Raffele Cretaro (yellow card) 35'	Stadium: Dalymount Park; Attendance: 2,914; Referee: Paul McLaughlin

22 February 2019 Round 2	U.C.D	0-2	Bohemians	Belfield, Dublin
19:45 GMT	Gary O'Neill (yellow card) 61'	Report	Danny Mandroiu 29'; Daniel Corcoran 32'; Patrick Kirk (yellow card) 78'; Ali Reghba (yellow card) 93'	Stadium: UCD Bowl; Attendance: 1,609; Referee: Sean Grant

25 February 2019 Round 3	Bohemians	1-0	Shamrock Rovers	Phibsborough, Dublin
19:45 GMT	Conor Levingston (yellow card) 33'; Daniel Corcoran 32' (pen.), (yellow card) 84'; James Finnerty (yellow card) 72'; James Talbot (yellow card) 90'	Report	Aaron Greene (red card) 29'; Sean Kavanagh (yellow card) 61'; Ronan Finn (yellow card) 66'; Roberto Lopes (yellow card) 69'	Stadium: Dalymount Park; Attendance: 3,593; Referee: Robert Harvey

1 March 2019 Round 4	Waterford	0-0	Bohemians	Waterford
19:45 GMT	Cory Galvin (yellow card) 37'; Ismahil Akinade (yellow card) 47'; Georgie Poynton (yellow card) 59'; Shane Duggan (yellow card) 93'	Report	Derek Pender (yellow card) 11'; Rob Cornwall (yellow card) 58'; James Finnerty (yellow card) 83'	Stadium: RSC; Attendance: 2,415; Referee: Robert Hennessy

8 March 2019 Round 5	Bohemians	1-1	Derry City	Phibsborough, Dublin
19:45 GMT	Derek Pender (yellow card) 45'; James Finnerty 76'; Darragh Leahy (yellow card) 78'	Report	Ciaran Coll (yellow card) 7'; Eoghan Stokes 52' (pen.), (yellow card) 84'; Gerardo Bruna (yellow card) 59'	Stadium: Dalymount Park; Attendance: 2,940; Referee: Tomas Connolly

15 March 2019 Round 6	Cork City	2-0	Bohemians	Cork
19:45 GMT	Conor McCarthy 23', (yellow card) 78'; Conor McCormack (yellow card) 30'; Dan Casey 50'	Report	Rob Cornwall (yellow card) 84'	Stadium: Turners Cross; Attendance: 3,016; Referee: Robert Hennessy

22 March 2019 Round 7	Dundalk	P-P	Bohemians	Dundalk
19:45 GMT				Stadium: Oriel Park
Note: Postponed until 15 April due to international call-ups.

29 March 2019 Round 8	Bohemians	1-0	St Patrick's Athletic	Phibsborough, Dublin
19:45 GMT	Keith Buckley 42'	Report	David Webster (yellow card) 72'; Mikey Drennan (red card) 77'	Stadium: Dalymount Park; Attendance: 3634; Referee: Robert Rogers

6 April 2019 Round 9	Sligo Rovers	0-2	Bohemians	Sligo
19:45 GMT	Ronan Murray (red card) 43'; Ronan Coughlan (yellow card) 44'; Daryl Fordyce (yellow card) 51'; David Cawley (yellow card) 70'	Report	James Finnerty 48'; Daniel Corcoran 76'; Rob Cornwall (red card) 79'	Stadium: The Showgrounds; Attendance: 1,978; Referee: Derek Michael Tomney

12 April 2019 Round 10	Finn Harps	0-1	Bohemians	Ballybofey
20:00 GMT		Report	Daniel Grant 38'	Stadium: Finn Park; Attendance: 688; Referee: Damien MacGraith

15 April 2019 Round 7	Dundalk	1-0	Bohemians	Dundalk
19:45 GMT	Sean Hoare (yellow card) 66'; Jamie McGrath (yellow card) 75'; Daniel Cleary (yellow card) 77'; Patrick Hoban 95' (pen.)	Report	Andy Lyons (yellow card) 49'; Robert McCourt (yellow card) 64'	Stadium: Oriel Park; Attendance: 2,748; Referee: Tomas Connolly
Note: Originally due to be played on 22 March but was postponed until 15 April due to international call ups.

19 April 2019 Round 11	Bohemians	3-0	U.C.D	Phibsborough, Dublin
19:45 GMT	Daniel Corcoran 44' (pen.); Conor Levingston 51', (yellow card) 74'; Daniel Grant 55'	Report	Mark Dignam (yellow card) 43'; Liam Scales (yellow card) 53'; Timmy Molloy (yellow card) 78'; Joshua Collins (yellow card) 90'	Stadium: Dalymount Park; Attendance: 2,968; Referee: Paul Tuite

23 April 2019 Round 12	Shamrock Rovers	0-1	Bohemians	Tallaght, Dublin
20:00 GMT	Trevor Clarke (red card) 27'; Lee Grace (yellow card) 4' (yellow-red card) 37'; Ronan Finn (yellow card) 75'	Report	James Finnerty (yellow card) 31'; Daniel Corcoran 38'	Stadium: Tallaght Stadium; Attendance: 6,414; Referee: Paul McLaughlin

26 April 2019 Round 13	Bohemians	0-0	Waterford	Phibsborough, Dublin
19:45 GMT		Report		Stadium: Dalymount Park; Attendance: 2,824; Referee: Graham Kelly

29 April 2019 Round 14	Derry City	0-2	Bohemians	Derry
19:45 GMT	Conor McDermott (yellow card) 65'	Report	Conor Levingston (yellow card) 19'; Danny Mandroiu 53', (yellow card) 76'; Daniel Corcoran 80'	Stadium: Ryan McBride Brandywell Stadium; Attendance: 2,750 (estimate); Referee: Robert Rogers

3 May 2019 Round 15	Bohemians	0-1	Cork City	Phibsborough, Dublin
19:45 GMT	James Talbot (yellow card) 82'; Derek Pender (yellow card) 91'	Report	Gearóid Morrissey 20'	Stadium: Dalymount Park; Attendance: 3,109; Referee: Damien MacGraith

10 May 2019 Round 16	Bohemians	0-2	Dundalk	Phibsborough, Dublin
19:45 GMT	Derek Pender (yellow card) 37'; Keith Buckley (yellow card) 74'	Report	Patrick McEleney (yellow card) 17'; Georgie Kelly 22'; Dean Jarvis (yellow card) 55'; Seán Hoare 79'	Stadium: Dalymount Park; Attendance: 3,535; Referee: Ben Connolly

17 May 2019 Round 17	St Patrick's Athletic	1-1	Bohemians	Inchicore, Dublin
19:45 GMT	Ciaran Kelly (yellow card) 38'; Darragh Markey 40'; Rhys McCabe (yellow card) 43'; Michael Drennan (yellow card) 70'; Ian Bermingham (yellow card) 70'; Simon Madden (yellow card) 71'; Jamie Lennon (yellow card) 77'	Report	Derek Pender (yellow card) 43'; Conor Levingston (yellow card) 53'; Danny Mandroiu 78'; James Finnerty (yellow card) 80'	Stadium: Richmond Park; Attendance: 2908; Referee: Robert Harvey

20 May 2019 Round 18	Dundalk	2-1	Bohemians	Dundalk
19:45 GMT	Georgie Kelly 66'; Dane Massey (yellow card) 71'; Patrick Hoban 96' (pen.)	Report	Danny Grant 2'; Ryan Swan (yellow card) 37'; Ryan Graydon (yellow card) 46' (yellow-red card) 54'; Aaron Barry (yellow card) 59'; Ali Reghba (yellow card) 72', Danny Mandroiu (yellow card) 84'; James Talbot (yellow card) 90'; Andrew Lyons (yellow card) 90'	Stadium: Oriel Park; Attendance: 2,312; Referee: Derek Tomney

24 May 2019 Round 19	Bohemians	1-2	Sligo Rovers	Phibsborough, Dublin
19:45 GMT	Conor Levingston (yellow card) 45', (goal) 53'; Derek Pender (red card) 70'; James Finnerty (yellow card) 90'	Report	Romeo Parkes 48', 88'; David Cawley (yellow card) 73'; John Mahon (yellow card) 78'	Stadium: Dalymount Park; Attendance: 2,353; Referee: Neil Doyle

31 May 2019 Round 20	Bohemians	5-3	Finn Harps	Phibsborough, Dublin
19:45 GMT	Kevin Devaney 1'; Ryan Swan 27', 53'; Danny Mandroiu 50'; Scott Allardice (yellow card) 70'; Keith Ward 81'; Patrick Kirk (yellow card) 85'	Report	Niall Logue 3'; Sam Todd (yellow card) 20'; Caolan McAleer (yellow card) 28' (yellow-red card) 63'; Sean Boyd (yellow card) 39'; Raffaele Cretaro 48'; Daniel O'Reilly 87'	Stadium: Dalymount Park; Attendance: 2,046; Referee: Graham Kelly

8 June 2019 Round 21	U.C.D	P-P	Bohemians	Belfield, Dublin
19:45 GMT				Stadium: UCD Bowl
Note: Postponed until 15 July due to international call-ups.

14 June 2019 Round 22	Bohemians	2-1	Shamrock Rovers	Phibsborough, Dublin
20:00 GMT	Danny Mandroiu 24' 60' (pen.); Michael Barker (yellow card) 68'; Patrick Kirk (yellow card) 70'; James Talbot (yellow card) 87'	Report	Lee Grace (yellow card) 31'; Daniel Carr 51'; Dylan Watts (yellow card) 90'	Stadium: Dalymount Park; Attendance: 3,594; Referee: Robert Rogers

28 June 2019 Round 23	Waterford	1-2	Bohemians	Waterford
19:45 GMT	Michael Barker 22' (o.g.); Karolis Chvedukas (yellow card) 41'; Rory Feely (yellow card) 68'	Report	Rory Feely 22' (o.g.); Michael Barker (yellow card) 82', (goal) 90'	Stadium: RSC; Attendance: 1,523; Referee: Paul McLaughlin

1 July 2019 Round 24	Bohemians	0-0	Derry City	Phibsborough, Dublin
19:45 GMT		Report	Aidy Delap (yellow card) 77'; Eoin Toal (yellow card) 81'	Stadium: Dalymount Park; Attendance: 2,448; Referee: Sean Grant

5 July 2019 Round 25	Cork City	0-0	Bohemians	Cork
19:45 GMT	Garry Buckley (yellow card) 69'; Karl Sheppard (yellow card) 76'	Report	Patrick Kirk (yellow card) 65'; Danny Mandroiu (yellow card) 66'; Darragh Leahy (yellow card) 77'	Stadium: Turners Cross; Attendance: 2,115; Referee: Raymond Matthews

15 July 2019 Round 21	U.C.D	3-0*	Bohemians	Belfield, Dublin
19:45 GMT	Yousef Mahdy 8'; Daniel Tobin (yellow card) 51'; Paul Doyle (yellow card) 66'; Evan Farrell (yellow card) 82'; Conor Kearns (yellow card) 90+8'	Report	Michael Barker (yellow card) 59'; James Finnerty (yellow card) 90'	Stadium: UCD Bowl; Attendance: 1,352; Referee: Derek Tomney
Note: UCD retroactively awarded a 3-0 victory as Bohemians fielded an ineligible player. Original fixture was UCD 1-0 Bohs.

21 July 2019 Round 26	Bohemians	3-0	St Patrick's Athletic	Phibsborough, Dublin
15:00 GMT	Ryan Swan 43', 90+2'; Conor Levingston 82' (pen.); Paddy Kirk (yellow card) 62'	Report	Dean Clarke (yellow card) 38'	Stadium: Dalymount Park; Attendance: 2,451; Referee: Rob Rogers
Note: Originally due to be played on 19 July but was postponed until 21 July due to St. Pat's Europa League fixtures.

27 July 2019 Round 27	Sligo Rovers	1-1	Bohemians	Sligo
19:45 GMT	David Cawley 44'	Report	Danny Mandroiu 37' (pen.)	Stadium: The Showgrounds; Attendance: 2,011; Referee: Graham Kelly

2 August 2019 Round 28	Finn Harps	1-0	Bohemians	Ballybofey
20:00 GMT	Harry Ascroft 8'; Jacob Borg (yellow card) 35'; Mark Russell (yellow card) 75'; Tony McNamee (yellow card) 88'	Report	Michael Barker (yellow card) 39'	Stadium: Finn Park; Attendance: 1,036; Referee: Damien MacGraith

16 August 2019 Round 29	Bohemians	10-1	U.C.D	Phibsborough, Dublin
19:45 GMT	Andre Wright 28' 52' 62' 87'; Conor Levingston 41'; Danny Grant 46'; Danny Mandroiu 51' 73' (pen.); 80' (pen.); Ross Tierney 67'	Report		Stadium: Dalymount Park; Attendance: 2,130; Referee: Anthony Buttimer

30 August 2019 Round 30	Shamrock Rovers	1-0	Bohemians	Tallaght, Dublin
20:00 GMT	Graham Burke 26'; Alan Mannus (yellow card) 90+2'; Joey O'Brien (yellow card) 58'; Ronan Finn (yellow card) 23'	Report	Andre Wright (yellow card) 41'	Stadium: Tallaght Stadium; Attendance: 7,021; Referee: Rob Hennessy

13 September 2019 Round 31	Bohemians	1-2	Waterford	Phibsborough, Dublin
19:45 GMT	Ross Tierney 58'	Report	Luke Wade-Slater 12' (o.g.); Tom Holland 83'	Stadium: Dalymount Park; Attendance: 2,373; Referee: Neil Doyle

20 September 2019 Round 32	Derry City	0–0	Bohemians	Derry
19:45 GMT	David Parkhouse (yellow card) 90'	Report	Patrick Kirk (yellow card) 61'; Ross Tierney (yellow card) 74'	Stadium: Ryan McBride Brandywell Stadium; Attendance: 2600 (estimate); Referee: Paul McLaughlin

4 October 2019 Round 33	Bohemians	1–0	Cork City	Phibsborough, Dublin
19:45 GMT	Derek Pender 47' (yellow card) 66'; Luke Wade-Slater (yellow card) 41'; Scott Allardice (yellow card) 69'		Dale Holland (yellow card) 90'	Stadium: Dalymount Park; Attendance: 2550; Referee: Robert Harvey

11 October 2019 Round 34	Bohemians	2-1	Dundalk	Phibsborough, Dublin
19:45 GMT	Luke Wade-Slater; Andre Wright; Paddy Kirk (yellow card) 55'	Report	Michael Duffy	Stadium: Dalymount Park; Attendance: 3,045; Referee: Graham Kelly

18 October 2019 Round 35	St Patrick's Athletic	0-0	Bohemians	Inchicore, Dublin
19:45 GMT	Dean Clarke (yellow card) 36'; David Webster (yellow card) 40'; Cian Coleman (yellow card) 41'	Report	James Finnerty (yellow card) 20' (yellow-red card) 62'; Aaron Barry (yellow card) 24'; Paddy Kirk (yellow card) 37'	Stadium: Richmond Park; Attendance: 3,022; Referee: Neil Doyle

25 October 2019 Round 36	Bohemians	2–1	Sligo Rovers	Phibsborough, Dublin
19:45 GMT	Danny Mandroiu 57' (yellow card) 84'; Derek Pender 81' (pen.); Paddy Kirk (yellow card) 60'; Danny Grant (yellow card) 61'	Report	Daryl Fordyce 31'; Lewis Banks (yellow card) 11'; Kyle Callan-McFadden (yellow card) 56'; John Mahon (yellow card) 60'; Luke McNicholas (yellow card) 80'	Stadium: Dalymount Park; Attendance: 3,241; Referee: Rob Hennessy

=== FAI Cup ===
9 August 2019 First Round	Bohemians	3-2	Shelbourne	Phibsborough, Dublin
19:45	Keith Buckley 85'; Danny Mandroiu 88', 90+1'	Report	Ciaran Kilduff 62'; Shane Farrell 81'; Jaze Kabia (yellow card) 74' (yellow-red card) 83'	Stadium: Dalymount Park; Attendance: 2,987; Referee: Robert Harvey

23 August 2018 Second Round	Bohemians	1–1 (a.e.t.) (5–4 p)	Longford Town	Phibsborough, Dublin
19:45	Andre Wright 91'	Report	Jack Doherty 94'	Stadium: Dalymount Park; Attendance: 1869; Referee: Paul Tuite
	Penalties
	Danny Mandroiu (penalty missed); Conor Levingston (penalty scored); Keith Ward (penalty scored); Ross Tierney (penalty scored); Darragh Leahy (penalty scored); Andre Wright (penalty scored)		(penalty missed) Dean Byrne; (penalty scored) Anto Breslin; (penalty scored) Jack Doherty; (penalty scored) Karl Chambers; (penalty scored) Sam Verdon; (penalty missed) Lee Stacey

16 September 2019 Quarter-final	Crumlin United	0-2	Bohemians	Inchicore, Dublin
19:45		Report	Andre Wright 15'; Andy Lyons 55'	Stadium: Richmond Park; Attendance: 2,150; Referee: Rob Rogers

27 September 2019 Semi-final	Bohemians	0–2	Shamrock Rovers	Phibsborough, Dublin
19:45	Danny Mandroiu (red card) 77'	Report	Graham Burke 15'; Aaron Greene 80'	Stadium: Dalymount Park; Attendance: 3,600; Referee: Rob Hennessy

=== EA Sports Cup ===
1 April 2019 Second Round	Bohemians	2-1	Cabinteely	Phibsborough, Dublin
19:45 GMT	Ryan Graydon 56'; Sam Byrne 77' (pen.)	Report	Luke Clucas 33'	Stadium: Dalymount Park; Attendance: 500 (Estimate); Referee: Stephen Parnell

27 May 2019 Quarter-final	Bohemians	2-0	Cork City	Phibsborough, Dublin
19:45 GMT	Ross Tierney 33'; Danny Mandroiu 82' (pen.)	Report		Stadium: Dalymount Park; Attendance: 665; Referee: Robert Hennessy

19 August 2019 Semi-final	Dundalk	6-1	Bohemians	Dundalk
19:45 GMT	Patrick Hoban 4', 10', 14', 51'; Patrick McEleney 42'; Daniel Kelly 71'	Report	Ross Tierney 62'	Stadium: Oriel Park; Attendance: 1,500 (estimate); Referee: Paul McLaughlin

=== Leinster Senior Cup ===
Win Draw Loss

11 March 2019 Fourth round	Shelbourne	1-4	Bohemians	Drumcondra, Dublin
19:45 GMT	Dayle Rooney 30'; James English (yellow card) 45+1'; Sean Quinn (yellow card) 90+2'	Report	Aaron Barry 8', 90+3'; Daniel Grant 14'; Scott Allardice (yellow card) 33'; Charles Mutawe 35' (o.g.); Robert McCourt (yellow card) 50'	Stadium: Tolka Park; Attendance: 657; Referee: Oliver Moran

12 October 2019 Quarterfinal	Bohemians	3-2	North End United	Phibsborough, Dublin
12:00 GMT	Ryan Graydon 82' 87' (pen.); Marlon Marishta 77'	Report	Paul Murphy 22'; Niall Connolly 50'	Stadium: Dalymount Park; Attendance: 250 (estimate); Referee: Mark Moynihan

Semi final	Bohemians	W/O	Athlone Town	Phibsborough, Dublin
				Stadium: Dalymount Park
Note: Bohemians withdrew from competition. Athlone Town advance to final.

=== Scottish Challenge Cup ===
7 September 2019 Third Round	Airdrieonians	3-2	Bohemians	Airdrie, North Lanarkshire
13:00	Callum Gallagher 19' 72'; Callum Smith 77'	Report	Scott Allardice 45+1'; Luke Wade-Slater 74'	Stadium: Excelsior Stadium; Attendance: 730; Referee: Huw Jones

=== Friendlies ===
Win Draw Loss

==== Pre-season ====
22 January 2019	Bohemians	2–2	Shelbourne	Abbotstown, Dublin
19:30	Keith Buckley; Colman Kennedy		Greg Moorhouse; Conan Byrne	Stadium: National Sports Campus

25 January 2019	Irish Defence Forces	0–0	Bohemians	Crumlin, Dublin
19:45				Stadium: Pearse Road

29 January 2019	Bohemians	4-0	Longford Town	Clonshaugh, Dublin
19:30	Keith Buckley; Danny Mandroiu; Keith Ward; Sam Byrne			Stadium: AUL Complex

8 February 2019	Bray Wanderers	0-2	Bohemians	Bray
19:45			Luke Wade-Slater 33'; Keith Ward 86'	Stadium: Carlisle Grounds; Attendance: 422

9 February 2019	Bohemians	3-2	Cabinteely	Blanchardstown, Dublin
11:00	Danny Mandroiu; Sam Byrne; Robert McCourt		Jack Watson; Keith Dalton	Stadium: IT Blanchardstown

==== Mid-season ====
10 July 2019	Bohemians	1-1	Chelsea	Phibsborough, Dublin
19:45	Eric Molloy (Trialist) 89'	Report	Michy Batshuayi 8'	Stadium: Dalymount Park; Attendance: 3, 800; Referee: Neil Doyle

== International call-ups ==
=== Republic of Ireland under-17 ===
Player	Opponent	Date	Venue	Competition
Evan Ferguson
Evan Ferguson	vs. Andorra	12 November 2019	Cork, Ireland	2020 UEFA Under-17 Euro Championship Qualification
Evan Ferguson	vs. Montenegro	14 November 2019	Cork, Ireland	2020 UEFA Under-17 Euro Championship Qualification

=== Republic of Ireland under-19 ===
Player	Opponent	Date	Venue	Competition
Ali Reghba
Ali Reghba	vs. Romania	20 March 2019	Krasnodar, Russia	2019 UEFA Under-19 Euro Championship Qualification
Ali Reghba	vs. Azerbaijan	23 March 2019	Krasnodar, Russia	2019 UEFA Under-19 Euro Championship Qualification
Ali Reghba	vs. Russia	26 March 2019	Krasnodar, Russia	2019 UEFA Under-19 Euro Championship Qualification
Andy Lyons
Andy Lyons	vs. Romania	20 March 2019	Krasnodar, Russia	2019 UEFA Under-19 Euro Championship Qualification
Andy Lyons	vs. Azerbaijan	23 March 2019	Krasnodar, Russia	2019 UEFA Under-19 Euro Championship Qualification
Andy Lyons	vs. Norway	15 July 2019	Yerevan, Armenia	2019 UEFA Under-19 Euro Championship
Andy Lyons	vs. France	18 July 2019	Yerevan, Armenia	2019 UEFA Under-19 Euro Championship
Andy Lyons	vs. Czech Republic	21 July 2019	Yerevan, Armenia	2019 UEFA Under-19 Euro Championship
Andy Lyons	vs. Portugal	24 July 2019	Yerevan, Armenia	2019 UEFA Under-19 Euro Championship
Andy Lyons	vs. France	18 July 2019	Yerevan, Armenia	2019 UEFA Under-19 Euro Championship
Andy Lyons	vs. Austria	14 November 2019	Salzburg, Austria	2020 UEFA Under-19 Euro Championship Qualification
Sean Bohan
Sean Bohan	vs. Denmark	11 October 2019	Dublin, Ireland	Friendly
Sean Bohan	vs. Denmark	14 October 2019	Dublin, Ireland	Friendly
Sean Bohan	vs. Gibraltar	16 November 2019	Straßwalchen, Austria	2020 UEFA Under-19 Euro Championship Qualification
Sean Bohan	vs. Austria	14 November 2019	Salzburg, Austria	2020 UEFA Under-19 Euro Championship Qualification
Dawson Devoy
Dawson Devoy	vs. Denmark	11 October 2019	Dublin, Ireland	Friendly
Dawson Devoy	vs. Denmark	14 October 2019	Dublin, Ireland	Friendly
Ross Tierney
Ross Tierney	vs. Denmark	11 October 2019	Dublin, Ireland	Friendly
Ross Tierney	vs. Denmark	14 October 2019	Dublin, Ireland	Friendly
Ross Tierney	vs. Gibraltar	16 November 2019	Straßwalchen, Austria	2020 UEFA Under-19 Euro Championship Qualification
Ross Tierney	vs. Austria	14 November 2019	Salzburg, Austria	2020 UEFA Under-19 Euro Championship Qualification

==== Albania under-20 ====
Player	Opponent	Date	Venue	Competition
Marlon Marishta
Marlon Marishta	vs. Croatia	16 November 2019	Tirana, Albania	Friendly

=== Republic of Ireland under-21 ===
Player	Opponent	Date	Venue	Competition
Darragh Leahy
Darragh Leahy	vs. Luxembourg	24 March 2019	Dublin, Ireland	UEFA Under-21 Euro 2021 Qualification
Darragh Leahy	vs. China	3 June 2019	Aubagne, France	2019 Toulon Tournament
Darragh Leahy	vs. Mexico	6 June 2019	Fos-sur-Mer, France	2019 Toulon Tournament
Darragh Leahy	vs. Bahrain	9 June 2019	Vitrolles, France	2019 Toulon Tournament
Darragh Leahy	vs. Brazil	12 June 2019	Aubagne, France	2019 Toulon Tournament
Darragh Leahy	vs. Mexico	15 June 2019	Salon-de-Provence, France	2019 Toulon Tournament
Darragh Leahy	vs. Armenia	6 September 2019	Dublin, Ireland	UEFA Under-21 Euro 2021 Qualification
Darragh Leahy	vs. Sweden	10 September 2019	Kalmar, Sweden	UEFA Under-21 Euro 2021 Qualification
Danny Mandroiu
Danny Mandroiu	vs. Luxembourg	24 March 2019	Dublin, Ireland	UEFA Under-21 Euro 2021 Qualification
Danny Mandroiu	vs. Armenia	6 September 2019	Dublin, Ireland	UEFA Under-21 Euro 2021 Qualification
Danny Mandroiu	vs. Sweden	10 September 2019	Kalmar, Sweden	UEFA Under-21 Euro 2021 Qualification
Danny Mandroiu	vs. Italy	10 October 2019	Dublin, Ireland	UEFA Under-21 Euro 2021 Qualification
Danny Mandroiu	vs. Iceland	15 October 2019	Reykjavík, Iceland	UEFA Under-21 Euro 2021 Qualification
Danny Mandroiu	vs. Armenia	14 November 2019	Yerevan, Armenia	UEFA Under-21 Euro 2021 Qualification
Danny Mandroiu	vs. Sweden	19 November 2019	Dublin, Ireland	UEFA Under-21 Euro 2021 Qualification
Daniel Grant
Daniel Grant	vs. Iceland	15 October 2019	Reykjavík, Iceland	UEFA Under-21 Euro 2021 Qualification
Daniel Grant	vs. Armenia	14 November 2019	Yerevan, Armenia	UEFA Under-21 Euro 2021 Qualification
Daniel Grant	vs. Sweden	19 November 2019	Dublin, Ireland	UEFA Under-21 Euro 2021 Qualification

=== Republic of Ireland national team ===
Player	Opponent	Date	Venue	Competition
James Talbot
James Talbot	vs. Denmark	7 June 2019	Copenhagen, Denmark	UEFA Euro 2020 Qualification
James Talbot	vs. Gibraltar	10 June 2019	Dublin, Ireland	UEFA Euro 2020 Qualification

== Awards ==
No.	Pos.	Player	Award
9	FW	Dinny Corcoran	SWAI League Of Ireland Player of the Month February
1	GK	James Talbot	SWAI League Of Ireland Player of the Month March
7	MF	Danny Mandroiu	SWAI League Of Ireland Player of the Month June
7	MF	Danny Mandroiu	PFAI Young Player of the Year
7	MF	Danny Mandroiu	PFAI Team of the Year Midfield
12	MF	Daniel Grant	Bohemian FC Young Player of the Year
1	GK	James Talbot	Bohemian FC Player of the Year

== Transfers ==
=== In ===
No.	Pos.	Player	From	Date	Fee	Source
Winter
1	GK	(Republic of Ireland) James Talbot	(England) Sunderland U23	1 January 2019	Free	
14	CM	(Republic of Ireland) Conor Levingston	(England) Wolves U23	1 January 2019	Free	
21	GK	(Republic of Ireland) Niall Corbet	(Republic of Ireland) Waterford	1 January 2019	Free	
18	CB	(Republic of Ireland) James Finnerty	(England) Rochdale	1 January 2019	Free	
23	CB	(Republic of Ireland) Michael Barker	(Republic of Ireland) St Patrick's Athletic	1 January 2019	Free	
7	AM	(Republic of Ireland) Danny Mandroiu	(England) Brighton U23	1 January 2019	Free	
27	RW	(Republic of Ireland) Luke Wade-Slater	(England) Stevenage	1 January 2019	Free	
6	CM	(Scotland) Scott Allardice	(Scotland) Dundee United	29 January 2019	Free	
15	FW	(Republic of Ireland) Sam Byrne	(Republic of Ireland) Dundalk	30 January 2019	Free	
Summer
15	FW	(England) Andre Wright	(England) Torquay United	22 July 2019	Free	
31	GK	(Republic of Ireland) Michael Kelly	(Republic of Ireland) Longford Town	1 August 2019	Free	

=== Loan in ===
No.	Pos.	Player	From	Date	Until	Fee	Source
Winter
4	CB	(Republic of Ireland) Aaron Barry	(Republic of Ireland) Cork City	14 February 2019	31 December 2019	Undisclosed	

=== Out ===
Pos.	Player	To	Date	Fee	Source
Winter
FW	(Republic of Ireland) Ryan Masterson	Released	1 January 2019	N/A	
GK	(Republic of Ireland) Colin McCabe	(Republic of Ireland) Shelbourne	1 January 2019	Free	
DM	(Republic of Ireland) Jonathan Lunney	(Republic of Ireland) Waterford	1 January 2019	Free	
CB	(Republic of Ireland) Dan Casey	(Republic of Ireland) Cork City	1 January 2019	Free	
CB	(Republic of Ireland) Dan Byrne	(Republic of Ireland) Shelbourne	1 January 2019	Free	
CB	(Republic of Ireland) Ian Morris	Retired	1 January 2019	N/A	
GK	(Republic of Ireland) Shane Supple	Retired	1 January 2019	N/A	
CM	(Republic of Ireland) Oscar Brennan	(Republic of Ireland) Shelbourne	1 January 2019	Free	
RW	(Republic of Ireland) Daniel Kelly	(Republic of Ireland) Dundalk	1 January 2019	Free	
FW	(Republic of Ireland) Eoghan Stokes	(Republic of Ireland) Derry City	5 February 2019	Free	
GK	(Republic of Ireland) Niall Corbet	Released	22 March 2019	N/A	
Summer
FW	(Republic of Ireland) Ali Reghba	(England) Leicester City U23s	5 July 2019	Undisclosed	
FW	(Republic of Ireland) Sam Byrne	(Republic of Ireland) UCD	24 July 2019	Free	
CM	(Republic of Ireland) Robbie McCourt	Tolka Rovers	20 September 2019	N/A	

=== Loan out ===
Pos.	Player	To	Date	Until	Fee	Source
Summer
MF	(Republic of Ireland) Dylan Thornton	(Republic of Ireland) Bray Wanderers	2 July 2019	31 December 2019	Free	
