= 2021 UEFA European Under-21 Championship qualification Group 1 =

Football tournament qualification stage

Group 1 of the 2021 UEFA European Under-21 Championship qualifying competition consisted of six teams: Italy, Sweden, Iceland, Republic of Ireland, Armenia, and Luxembourg. The composition of the nine groups in the qualifying group stage was decided by the draw held on 11 December 2018, 09:00 CET (UTC+1), at the UEFA headquarters in Nyon, Switzerland, with the teams seeded according to their coefficient ranking.

The group was originally scheduled to be played in home-and-away round-robin format between 24 March 2019 and 13 October 2020. Under the original format, the group winners and the best runners-up among all nine groups (not counting results against the sixth-placed team) would qualify directly for the final tournament, while the remaining eight runners-up would advance to the play-offs.

On 17 March 2020, all matches were put on hold due to the COVID-19 pandemic. On 17 June 2020, UEFA announced that the qualifying group stage would be extended and end on 17 November 2020, while the play-offs, originally scheduled to be played in November 2020, would be cancelled. Instead, the group winners and the five best runners-up among all nine groups (not counting results against the sixth-placed team) would qualify for the final tournament.

== Standings ==
Pos	Team	Pld	W	D	L	GF	GA	GD	Pts	Qualification	Italy	Iceland	Ireland	Sweden	Armenia	Luxembourg
1	Italy	10	8	1	1	27	5	+22	25	Final tournament	—	3–0	2–0	4–1	6–0	5–0
2	Iceland	10	7	0	3	19	12	+7	21	Final tournament	1–2	—	1–0	1–0	6–1	3–0
3	Republic of Ireland	10	6	1	3	15	8	+7	19		0–0	1–2	—	4–1	1–0	3–0
4	Sweden	10	6	0	4	31	12	+19	18		3–0	5–0	1–3	—	10–0	4–0
5	Armenia	10	1	0	9	4	33	−29	3 (Note: Ranked on head-to-head goal difference: Armenia +1, Luxembourg −1.)		0–1	0–3 (Note: The Armenia v Iceland match was awarded as a 3–0 win to Iceland after being cancelled as Armenia could not travel to the match due to positive SARS-CoV-2 tests in the team.)	0–1	0–3 (Note: The Armenia v Sweden match was awarded as a 3–0 win to Sweden after being cancelled as Armenia could not travel to the match due to positive SARS-CoV-2 tests in the team.)	—	2–0
6	Luxembourg	10	1	0	9	3	29	−26	3		0–4	0–2	1–2	0–3	2–1	—

Source: UEFA
Rules for classification: Tiebreakers

== Matches ==
Times are CET/CEST, (Note: CEST (UTC+2) for dates between 31 March and 26 October 2019 and between 29 March and 24 October 2020, and CET (UTC+1) for all other dates.) as listed by UEFA (local times, if different, are in parentheses).

24 March 2019
18:00 (17:00 GMT)

Republic of Ireland	3–0	Luxembourg
Idah 34', 68'; Farrugia 38'	Report

Tallaght Stadium, Dublin
Attendance: 4,772
Referee: Timotheos Christofi (Cyprus)

6 September 2019
19:00 (17:00 WET)

Iceland	3–0	Luxembourg
Guðjohnsen 48' (pen.); Þorsteinsson 58'; W. Willumsson 63'	Report

Víkingsvöllur, Reykjavík
Attendance: 412
Referee: Aleksandrs Anufrijevs (Latvia)
6 September 2019
21:00 (20:00 IST)

Republic of Ireland	1–0	Armenia
Parrott 31'	Report

Tallaght Stadium, Dublin
Attendance: 3,658
Referee: Fyodor Zammit (Malta)

9 September 2019
19:00 (17:00 WET)

Iceland	6–1	Armenia
W. Willumsson 30'; Ólafsson 34'; Þorsteinsson 40'; Jónsson 74'; Leifsson 76'; B. Willumsson 80'	Report	Melkonyan 60'

Víkingsvöllur, Reykjavík
Attendance: 335
Referee: Igor Pajac (Croatia)
10 September 2019
18:30

Italy	5–0	Luxembourg
Locatelli 9' (pen.); Kean 37' (pen.); Sottil 62'; Tumminello 68'; Scamacca 77'	Report

Stadio Teofilo Patini, Castel di Sangro
Attendance: 5,000
Referee: Peter Kjaesgaard (Denmark)
10 September 2019
18:30

Sweden	1–3	Republic of Ireland
Svanberg 19'	Report	Parrott 69', 90+2'; Masterson 87'

Guldfågeln Arena, Kalmar
Attendance: 4078
Referee: Rade Obrenovic (Slovenia)

10 October 2019
21:05 (20:05 IST)

Republic of Ireland	0–0	Italy
	Report

Tallaght Stadium, Dublin
Attendance: 7,231
Referee: Sascha Stegemann (Germany)
11 October 2019
13:00 (15:00 AMT)

Armenia	2–0	Luxembourg
R. Mkrtchyan 56'; Danielyan 86'	Report

Gyumri City Stadium, Gyumri
Attendance: 2,550
Referee: Sebastian Gishamer (Austria)
12 October 2019
15:45

Sweden	5–0	Iceland
Svanberg 22'; Gyökeres 38'; Leifsson 51' (o.g.); Kulusevski 60'; Erlingmark 75'	Report

Olympia, Helsingborg
Attendance: 1,832
Referee: Lawrence Visser (Belgium)

14 October 2019
18:30 (20:30 AMT)

Armenia	0–1	Italy
	Report	Scamacca 20'

Yerevan Football Academy Stadium, Yerevan
Attendance: 720
Referee: Ádám Farkas (Hungary)
15 October 2019
17:00 (15:00 WET)

Iceland	1–0	Republic of Ireland
Guðjohnsen 29' (pen.)	Report

Víkingsvöllur, Reykjavík
Attendance: 228
Referee: Dumitri Muntean (Moldova)
15 October 2019
19:00

Luxembourg	0–3	Sweden
	Report	Kulusevski 22' (pen.); Larsson 32', 42'

Stade Municipal de la Ville de Differdange, Differdange
Attendance: 0
Referee: Gal Leibovitz (Israel)

14 November 2019
13:00 (16:00 AMT)

Armenia	0–1	Republic of Ireland
	Report	Elbouzedi 63'

Yerevan Football Academy Stadium, Yerevan
Attendance: 270
Referee: Antti Munukka (Finland)
16 November 2019
18:30

Italy	3–0	Iceland
Sottil 32'; Cutrone 84', 90'	Report

Stadio Paolo Mazza, Ferrara
Attendance: 4129
Referee: Horatiu Fesnic (Romania)

19 November 2019
21:00 (Note: The match between Italy and Armenia was originally scheduled at 18:30 CET, but was postponed due to heavy rain.)

Italy	6–0	Armenia
Kean 15', 41'; Pinamonti 25'; Zanellato 53'; Scamacca 57'; Del Prato 66'	Report

Stadio Angelo Massimino, Catania
Attendance: 2700
Referee: Stéphanie Frappart (France)
19 November 2019
21:00 (20:00 GMT)

Republic of Ireland	4–1	Sweden
O'Connor 50'; Idah 63'; Parrott 73'; Elbouzedi 87'	Report	Gyökeres 18'

Tallaght Stadium, Dublin
Attendance: 2760
Referee: Karim Abed (France)

4 September 2020
18:30 (16:30 WET)

Iceland	1–0	Sweden
Guðjohnsen 66'	Report

Víkingsvöllur, Reykjavík
Attendance: 0 (Note: Due to the COVID-19 pandemic in Europe, all matches scheduled for September 2020 were played behind closed doors.)
Referee: Pavel Orel (Czech Republic)

8 September 2020
17:00

Luxembourg	2–1	Armenia
Korac 38'; Avdusinovic 90+5'	Report	Harutyunyan 25'

Stade de la Frontière, Esch-sur-Alzette
Attendance: 0
Referee: Juxhin Xhaja (Albania)
8 September 2020
18:30

Sweden	3–0	Italy
Almqvist 13', 30'; Henriksson 52'	Report

Guldfågeln Arena, Kalmar
Attendance: 0
Referee: Luis Godinho (Portugal)

9 October 2020
18:30

Sweden	4–0	Luxembourg
Karlsson 22' (pen.), 33'; Svensson 31'; Beijmo 71'	Report

Olympia, Helsingborg
Attendance: 0
Referee: Christian-Petru Ciochirca (Austria)

13 October 2020
17:00

Italy	2–0	Republic of Ireland
Sottil 43'; Cutrone 62'	Report

Arena Garibaldi - Stadio Romeo Anconetani, Pisa
Attendance: 0
Referee: Krzysztof Jakubik (Poland)
13 October 2020
17:00

Luxembourg	0–2	Iceland
	Report	Ólafsson 30'; Guðjohnsen 32'

Stade Émile Mayrisch, Esch-sur-Alzette
Attendance: 250
Referee: Ondrej Pechanec (Czech Republic)
13 October 2020
18:30

Sweden	10–0	Armenia
Karlsson 32' (pen.), 41' (pen.), 44'; Ingelsson 57'; Abraham 68', 90+2'; Hansson 77', 82', 90+3'; Sarr 88'	Report

Arena Lublin, Lublin (Poland) (Note: The match between Sweden and Armenia was played in Poland due to travel restrictions related to the COVID-19 pandemic between Sweden and Armenia.)
Attendance: 0
Referee: Milovan Milacic (Montenegro)

12 November 2020 (Note: The match between Iceland and Italy was originally scheduled on 9 October 2020, 15:30 WET, at Víkingsvöllur, Reykjavík, but was postponed due to members of the Italy team testing positive for the COVID-19 virus. It was rescheduled to 12 November 2020.)
14:15 (13:15 WET)

Iceland	1–2	Italy
W. Willumsson 63'	Report	Pobega 35', 88'

Víkingsvöllur, Reykjavík
Attendance: 0
Referee: Ioannis Papadopoulos (Greece)
13 November 2020 (Note: All matches originally scheduled to be played in March 2020 were postponed due to the COVID-19 pandemic in Europe. These matches were subsequently rescheduled to be played in November 2020.)
16:00 (17:00 EET)

Armenia	0–3 Awarded (Note: The home matches of Armenia against Sweden and Iceland, originally scheduled to be played on 13 and 18 November 2020, were cancelled due to the large number of Armenia players testing positive of the COVID-19 virus and the difficulty of getting a new group of players to travel to Cyprus in short notice. The matches were awarded as 3–0 wins to Sweden and Iceland.)	Sweden
	Report

Antonis Papadopoulos Stadium, Larnaca (Cyprus) (Note: The home matches of Armenia against Sweden and Iceland were moved to the neutral venue of Antonis Papadopoulos Stadium, Larnaca (Cyprus), as UEFA announced on 20 October 2020 to temporarily suspend all UEFA matches taking place in Armenia and Azerbaijan until further notice due to the Nagorno-Karabakh conflict.)

15 November 2020
13:30 (12:30 GMT)

Republic of Ireland	1–2	Iceland
Leifsson 75' (o.g.)	Report	Guðjohnsen 25'; Ingimundarson 90+3'

Tallaght Stadium, Dublin
Attendance: 0
Referee: Juan Martínez Munuera (Spain)
15 November 2020
17:30

Luxembourg	0–4	Italy
	Report	Scamacca 15', 29'; Pinamonti 56'; Marchizza 66'

Stade Municipal de Differdange, Differdange
Attendance: 100
Referee: Matthew De Gabriele (Malta)

18 November 2020
17:30

Italy	4–1	Sweden
Maleh 27'; Raspadori 48', 61'; Scamacca 68'	Report	Karlsson 50'

Arena Garibaldi – Stadio Romeo Anconetani, Pisa
Attendance: 0
Referee: Stuart Attwell (England)
18 November 2020
17:30 (18:30 EET)

Armenia	0–3 Awarded	Iceland
	Report

Antonis Papadopoulos Stadium, Larnaca (Cyprus)
18 November 2020
17:30

Luxembourg	1–2	Republic of Ireland
Avdusinovic 84'	Report	Kayode 35'; Lennon 65'

Stade rue Henri Dunant, Beggen
Attendance: 0
Referee: Kaarlo Oskari Hämäläinen (Finland)

== Goalscorers ==
There were 93 goals scored in 28 matches, for an average of 3.32 goals per match.

6 goals

- (Italy) Gianluca Scamacca
- (Sweden) Jesper Karlsson

5 goals

- (Iceland) Sveinn Aron Guðjohnsen

4 goals

- (Republic of Ireland) Troy Parrott

3 goals

- (Italy) Patrick Cutrone
- (Italy) Moise Kean
- (Italy) Riccardo Sottil
- (Republic of Ireland) Adam Idah
- (Iceland) Willum Þór Willumsson
- (Sweden) Emil Hansson

2 goals

- (Iceland) Ísak Ólafsson
- (Iceland) Jón Dagur Þorsteinsson
- (Italy) Andrea Pinamonti
- (Italy) Tommaso Pobega
- (Italy) Giacomo Raspadori
- (Republic of Ireland) Zach Elbouzedi
- (Luxembourg) Kenan Avdusinovic
- (Sweden) Paulos Abraham
- (Sweden) Pontus Almqvist
- (Sweden) Viktor Gyökeres
- (Sweden) Dejan Kulusevski
- (Sweden) Jake Larsson
- (Sweden) Mattias Svanberg

1 goal

- (Armenia) Artur Danielyan
- (Armenia) Hovhannes Harutyunyan
- (Armenia) Karen Melkonyan
- (Armenia) Rudik Mkrtchyan
- (Iceland) Jónatan Ingi Jónsson
- (Iceland) Ari Leifsson
- (Iceland) Brynjólfur Darri Willumsson
- (Italy) Enrico Del Prato
- (Italy) Manuel Locatelli
- (Italy) Youssef Maleh
- (Italy) Riccardo Marchizza
- (Italy) Marco Tumminello
- (Italy) Niccolò Zanellato
- (Republic of Ireland) Neil Farrugia
- (Republic of Ireland) Joshua Kayode
- (Republic of Ireland) Jamie Lennon
- (Republic of Ireland) Conor Masterson
- (Republic of Ireland) Lee O'Connor
- (Iceland) Valdimar Þór Ingimundarson
- (Luxembourg) Seid Korac
- (Sweden) Felix Beijmo
- (Sweden) August Erlingmark
- (Sweden) Gustav Henriksson
- (Sweden) Svante Ingelsson
- (Sweden) Amin Sarr
- (Sweden) Max Svensson

2 own goals

- (Iceland) Ari Leifsson (against Republic of Ireland and Sweden)
