= 2019 League of Ireland Cup final =

- Event: 2019 League of Ireland Cup
Derry City	Dundalk
2	2
- After extra time Dundalk won 6–5 on penalties
- Date: 14 September 2019
- Venue: Ryan McBride Brandywell Stadium, Derry
- Referee: Robert Hennessy (Dublin)
- Attendance: 3,000 (est)

The 2019 League of Ireland Cup final was the final match of the 2019 League of Ireland Cup, called the EA Sports Cup for sponsorship purposes, a knock-out association football competition contested annually by clubs affiliated with the League of Ireland. It took place on 14 September 2019 at the Ryan McBride Brandywell Stadium in Derry, and was contested by Dundalk and Derry City. Dundalk won 6–5 in a penalty shoot-out, following a 2–2 draw after extra-time.

== Background ==
The League Cup was the first trophy of the 2019 League of Ireland season. The two sides had met three times in the League already, with two draws and one win for Dundalk, while Dundalk had won a second round FAI Cup tie 3–2 after extra-time. They had last won the cup in 2017, and had reached the final by defeating St Patrick's Athletic (2–1), UCD (3–1) and Bohemians (6–1).

Derry City were the League Cup holders, and had reached the final by defeating Longford Town (3–0), Finn Harps (2–1), and Waterford (4–2).

The final was broadcast live on Eir Sport. Dundalk wore their third kit for the match, which had been introduced that season as part of a fundraising partnership between the club and Temple Street Children's University Hospital. The logo of the charity replaced that of official sponsor Fyffes on the chest of the shirt.

== Match ==
=== Summary ===
Dundalk were the pre-match favourites, however the closeness of the previous matches between the sides was notable. Derry City took a third-minute lead through David Parkhouse, following an error by Dundalk goalkeeper Aaron McCarey. Michael Duffy equalised for Dundalk in the 38th minute with a curling strike from outside the penalty area. Junior Ogedi-Uzokwe gave Derry City the lead again six minutes after half-time, when his deflected shot wrong-footed McCarey. Subsequently, two quick yellow cards for Grant Gillespie saw Derry City reduced to 10 men, and Dundalk equalised in the 69th minute through Sean Gannon. Dundalk couldn't capitalise on their numerical advantage in the remaining time, or in extra-time, which sent the final to a penalty shoot-out. Following one missed penalty each, the shoot-out moved to sudden-death with Dundalk prevailing.

=== Details ===
14 September 2019
20:00

Derry City	2–2 (a.e.t.)	Dundalk
Parkhouse 3'; Ogedi-Uzokwe 51'	Report	Duffy 38'; Gannon 69'
Penalties
Jamie McDonagh (penalty scored); McNamee (penalty scored); Malone (penalty missed); McCrudden (penalty scored); Harkin (penalty scored); Toal (penalty scored); Gilchrist (penalty missed)	5–6	Hoban (penalty scored); Duffy (penalty scored); Cleary (penalty scored); Jarvis (penalty scored); Benson (penalty missed); Hoare (penalty scored); Shields (penalty scored)

Ryan McBride Brandywell Stadium, Derry
Attendance: 3,000 (est)
Referee: Robert Hennessy (Dublin)

Derry City	Dundalk

GK	1	(Scotland) Peter Cherrie
DF	3	(Republic of Ireland) Ciaran Coll
DF	23	(Scotland) Ally Gilchrist
DF	15	(Northern Ireland) Eoin Toal
MF	8	(Argentina) Gerardo Bruna	(substituted off) 46'
MF	24	(Scotland) Grant Gillespie
MF	4	(Northern Ireland) Ciaron Harkin
MF	7	(Northern Ireland) Jamie McDonagh
MF	25	(Republic of Ireland) Barry McNamee (c)
FW	11	(England) Junior Ogedi-Uzokwe	(substituted off) 100'
FW	9	(Northern Ireland) David Parkhouse	(substituted off) 78'
Substitutes:
MF	22	(Northern Ireland) Darren McCauley	(substituted in) 46' (substituted off) 118'
MF	29	(Republic of Ireland) Jack Malone	(substituted in) 78'
FW	10	(Northern Ireland) Michael McCrudden	(substituted in) 100'
MF	12	(Republic of Ireland) Adrian Delap	(substituted in) 118'
Manager:
(Northern Ireland) Declan Devine

GK	20	(Republic of Ireland) Aaron McCarey
RB	2	(Republic of Ireland) Sean Gannon
CB	21	(Republic of Ireland) Daniel Cleary
CB	4	(Republic of Ireland) Seán Hoare
LB	14	(Republic of Ireland) Dane Massey
RM	27	(Republic of Ireland) Daniel Kelly	(substituted off) 67'
CM	5	(Republic of Ireland) Chris Shields
CM	11	(Republic of Ireland) Patrick McEleney	(substituted off) 102'
LM	7	(Northern Ireland) Michael Duffy
AM	10	(Republic of Ireland) Jamie McGrath	(substituted off) 87'
CF	9	(Republic of Ireland) Patrick Hoban (c)
Substitutes:
MF	29	(Republic of Ireland) Robbie Benson	(substituted in) 67'
FW	10	(Republic of Ireland) Georgie Kelly	(substituted in) 87'
DF	22	(Northern Ireland) Dean Jarvis	(substituted in) 102'
Manager:
(Republic of Ireland) Vinny Perth
