= Sam Byrne (footballer) =

Irish professional footballer

Personal information
- Full name: Sam John Byrne
- Date of birth: 23 July 1995 (age 31)
- Place of birth: Dublin, Ireland
- Height: 1.84 m (6 ft 0 in)
- Position: Forward

Youth career
- St Joseph's Boys
- 2011–2013: Manchester United

Senior career*
Years	Team	Apps	(Gls)
2013–2014	Manchester United	0	(0)
2014	→ Carlisle United (loan)	17	(1)
2014–2018	Everton	0	(0)
2018	→ Dundalk (loan)	2	(0)
2018	Dundalk	0	(0)
2018	→ Glentoran (loan)	6	(0)
2019	Bohemians	5	(0)
2019	UCD	10	(1)

International career^{‡}
2009–2010	Republic of Ireland U15	6	(3)
2010–2011	Republic of Ireland U16	7	(1)
2010–2012	Republic of Ireland U17	19	(4)
2012–2014	Republic of Ireland U19	10	(7)
2014–2016	Republic of Ireland U21	2	(0)
- * Club domestic league appearances and goals as of 1:30, 26 July 2019 (UTC) ‡ National team caps and goals as of 20:56, 13 January 2016 (UTC)

Sam John Byrne (born 23 July 1995) is an Irish professional footballer who last played as a forward for UCD. Born in Dublin, he began his career with St. Joseph's Boys before joining Manchester United in July 2011. He has also represented the Republic of Ireland at every youth international level from under-15 to under-19. His brother is former Connacht and Leinster rugby player Adam Byrne.

== Club career ==
After beginning his career with St. Joseph's, Byrne joined Manchester United in July 2011, entering the club's academy as a first-year scholar. He made his debut for the club's under-18 team away to Southampton on 27 August 2011, but it took three months for him to score his first goal, which came against Liverpool on 25 November 2011. He soon became a regular starter for the under-18s and went on to score four goals in 28 appearances in his first season with the club.

The 2012–13 season began slowly for Byrne as he scored just two goals in 11 appearances before the turn of the year; however, five goals in the second half of the season – including braces against Fulham and Southampton – earned him plaudits from coach Paul McGuinness.

In 2013–14, Byrne played in all six of Manchester United's UEFA Youth League group matches but was unable to get on the scoresheet as United finished bottom of Group A and were eliminated from the competition. On 31 January 2014, he was loaned to Carlisle United with team-mate Charni Ekangamene. He made his professional debut the next day, coming on as a substitute against Bristol City.

On 23 May 2014 Byrne was released by Manchester United, and joined Everton on a free transfer on 18 July. At the start of the 2018 season, he joined League of Ireland Premier Division side Dundalk on loan before signing permanently for the club on 9 July 2018.

On 16 August 2018, he joined Glentoran on loan. On 30 January 2019, it was announced that Byrne had signed for Bohemians for the 2019 season; he had scored a penalty in a 4–0 friendly win against Longford Town the previous night. Byrne made eight competitive appearances for Bohemians, scoring once. In July 2019, he signed for UCD.

== International career ==
Byrne has represented the Republic of Ireland at under-15, under-16, under-17 and under-19 levels.

He made his debut for the under-15s as a left-winger in a match against the Aspire Academy from Qatar on 14 December 2009. He moved up front for a second match against the Qatari side two days later and scored Ireland's only goal in a 3–1 defeat. He marked the last of his six appearances for the under-15s with a brace of goals in a 5–0 win against Northern Ireland.

He made the step up to the under-16s at a tournament in Italy in October 2010, playing in all three matches against Ukraine, Italy and Denmark. His first goal for the under-16s came in the first of two fixtures against Hungary on 23 November 2010, the first in a 2–1 win. He missed the team's trip to Turkey in March 2011 after being selected for the under-17s' 2011 UEFA Under-17 elite round matches against Denmark, Greece and Latvia, but returned to captain the side in a double-header at home to Belgium in April 2011, his final under-16 appearances.

Byrne made his under-17 debut in a tournament in Hungary in August 2010, giving Ireland the lead against the host nation in the semi-finals, only for Hungary to equalise and go on to win 4–2 on penalties. Ireland then lost to Serbia in the third-place play-off and finished fourth in the tournament. His impressive performances in Hungary meant he was retained in the squad for the 2011 UEFA Under-17 qualifiers against Norway, Albania and group hosts Malta. He appeared as a substitute in the wins against Malta and Albania that sealed Ireland's qualification to the elite round, but despite starting against Norway, he was unable to prevent defeat and Ireland finished second in the group. After a double-header in Italy in February 2011, Byrne played in all three UEFA Under-17 elite round matches against Denmark, Greece and Latvia, only for the undefeated Irish to miss out on the finals after Denmark beat Greece with a last-minute goal.

As an early starter in the under-17s, Byrne was able to continue in the side for a second year, starting with a double-header against Serbia in September 2011. He then played in all three of Ireland's 2012 UEFA Under-17 qualifiers against Liechtenstein, Kazakhstan and the Czech Republic in October 2011, scoring a hat-trick in an 8–0 win against Liechtenstein. After drawing with Kazakhstan and losing to the Czech Republic, Ireland qualified for the elite round ahead of Kazakhstan on goal difference. After a training camp in Portugal in February 2012, Byrne was again selected for the under-17 squad for the elite round matches against Serbia, the Netherlands and Albania in March 2012. He started all three games, but Ireland lost all three by a one-goal margin and finished bottom of their group, bringing Byrne's under-17 career to a close.

Byrne was first named in the Ireland under-19s squad for their 2013 UEFA Under-19 qualifiers against Luxembourg, Macedonia and Germany in October 2012. Byrne scored in Ireland's 5–2 win over Luxembourg and their 2–2 draw with Germany, and narrowly missed scoring in their 1–0 win over Macedonia as the team qualified for the elite round in second place. A friendly double-header against the Czech Republic followed in February 2013; after coming on as a substitute in a 2–1 win on 5 February, Byrne started the second match on 7 February, scoring Ireland's equaliser in a 1–1 draw. He then started all three elite round matches against Switzerland, Slovakia and Serbia, scoring in the 2–2 draws against Switzerland and Slovakia. However, he was unable to repeat the feat against Serbia and the match finished in a goalless draw; having needed a win to qualify, Ireland ultimately finished bottom of the group and were eliminated.

Byrne continued in the under-19s for the 2013–14 season, captaining the side for a friendly against Norway on 13 August 2013, before scoring after coming off the bench against the same opposition two days later. After another friendly double-header against Slovenia in September 2013, Byrne was named in the Ireland squad for their 2014 UEFA Under-19 qualifiers against Azerbaijan, Sweden and Bosnia and Herzegovina in October 2013, only for an injury suffered while playing for the Manchester United youth team to rule him out of the entire campaign.

Byrne was named in the squad for the Republic of Ireland U19 team for their UEFA elite qualifiers. He scored two crucial goals to secure a 2–1 win against Iceland in their first game.

== Career statistics ==
Professional appearances – correct as of 11 December 2019.

Club	Season	League			National Cup		League Cup		Europe		Other		Total	
Club	Season	Division	Apps	Goals	Apps	Goals	Apps	Goals	Apps	Goals	Apps	Goals	Apps	Goals
Manchester United	2013–14	Premier League	0	0	0	0	0	0	0 (Note: Appearances in UEFA Champions League)	0	—		0	0
Carlisle United (loan)	2013–14	EFL League One	17	1	—		—		—		—		17	1
Everton	2014–15	Premier League	0	0	0	0	0	0	0 (Note: Appearances in UEFA Europa League)	0	—		0	0
Everton	2015–16	Premier League	0	0	0	0	0	0	—		—		0	0
Everton	2016–17	Premier League	0	0	0	0	0	0	—		—		0	0
Everton	2017–18	Premier League	0	0	0	0	0	0	0	0	—		0	0
Dundalk (loan)	2018	League of Ireland Premier Division	2	0	—		1	0	—		1 (Note: Appearances in Leinster Senior Cup)	1	4	1
Dundalk	2018	League of Ireland Premier Division	0	0	1	0	0	0	0	0	0	0	1	0
Dundalk	Dundalk Total		2	0	1	0	1	0	0	0	1	1	5	1
Glentoran (loan)	2018–19	NIFL Premiership	6	0	0	0	0	0	—		—		6	0
Bohemians	2019	League of Ireland Premier Division	5	0	—		2	1	—		1	0	8	1
UCD	2019	League of Ireland Premier Division	10	1	3	0	—		—		2	0	15	1
Career Total			40	2	4	0	3	1	0	0	4	1	43	4
