= Luke Wade-Slater =

Irish association football player

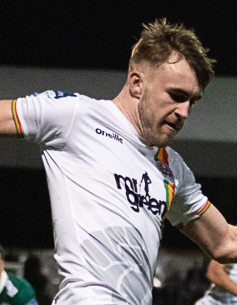
- Wade-Slater in 2019

Personal information
- Full name: Luke Wade-Slater
- Date of birth: 2 March 1998 (age 28)
- Place of birth: Dublin, Ireland
- Height: 1.80 m (5 ft 11 in)
- Positions: Defender; midfielder

Youth career
- 2004–2015: St Kevin's Boys
- 2015–2017: Stevenage

Senior career*
| Years | Team | Apps | (Gls) |
| 2016–2018 | Stevenage | 2 | (0) |
| 2018 | → Kings Langley (loan) | 6 | (5) |
| 2019–2020 | Bohemians | 31 | (3) |
| 2020–2021 | Larne | 13 | (0) |
| 2021–2023 | Warrenpoint Town | 65 | (6) |
| 2023 | Drogheda United | 5 | (0) |
| 2024–2025 | Longford Town | 33 | (2) |

International career
| 2015 | Republic of Ireland U17 | 5 | (0) |
| 2016 | Republic of Ireland U18 | 3 | (0) |
- * Club domestic league appearances and goals as of 12:40, 14 July 2026 (GMT)

Luke Wade-Slater (born 2 March 1998) is an Irish footballer.

== Club career ==
=== Stevenage ===
Wade-Slater joined Stevenage as an academy scholar in the summer of 2015, having previously played at Irish academy team St Kevin's Boys. He played regularly for Stevenage's under-18 team for two seasons, also playing in the club's FA Youth Cup run during the 2015–16 season. He made his first-team debut for Stevenage on 8 November 2016, coming on as a 77th-minute substitute in a 4–0 EFL Trophy victory over Southend United at Broadhall Way. He subsequently signed his first professional contract with the club on 23 May 2017. Wade-Slater made his Football League debut as a second-half substitute in Stevenage's 1–0 away defeat to Crewe Alexandra on 7 October 2017. He signed a "new and improved" contract with the Hertfordshire club on 6 December 2017.

Having made no first-team appearances three months into the 2018–19 season, Wade-Slater joined Kings Langley of the Southern League Premier Division South on loan on 6 November 2018, with the agreement running until January 2019. He made his debut for Kings Langley on 10 November 2018, scoring the only goal of the game in a 1–0 away victory at Farnborough. He went on to score in each of his first five appearances for Kings Langley, making six appearances during the loan spell, before being recalled by Stevenage in December 2018.

=== Bohemians ===
==== 2019 season ====
Following his recall from Kings Langley in December 2018, Wade-Slater signed for League of Ireland Premier Division club Bohemians, officially joining on 1 January 2019. On his debut against Finn Harps on 15 February 2019, he assisted the winning goal for Dinny Corcoran. His first goal for the club came in a Scottish Challenge Cup loss to Airdrieonians on 7 September. He scored in the 28th minute of a 2–1 home win against champions Dundalk on 11 October. He ended his debut season at Bohemians having played 34 games in total, scoring 2 goals and notching up 5 assists.

==== 2020 season ====
Wade-Slater featured in three of Bohemians' four opening games of the 2020 season before it was shortened to 18 games due to the COVID-19 pandemic. When the campaign was resumed in August, he was not included in any of Keith Long's matchday squads. During his time at the club, he made a total of 38 appearances.

=== Larne ===
Wade-Slater signed for NIFL Premiership club Larne on 5 October 2020. His made his debut off the bench on 7 November in a goalless draw with Glentoran. He featured sporadically, coming off the bench in a number of games across the season. Wade-Slater played a total of 13 games for Larne in the 2020/21 season, and left the club at the end of the season.

=== Warrenpoint Town ===
==== 2021–22 season ====
It was announced on 23 June 2021, that Wade-Slater had signed a contract with NIFL Premiership side Warrenpoint Town. He assisted the winning goal on his debut, a 2–1 win at home against Ballymena United. On 27 November he scored his first goals for the club, including an 89th-minute winner, in a 2–1 comeback win away at Carrick Rangers. One week later, he continued his scoring streak with another goal, a header against Ballymena. On 5 February 2022 he scored both goals in a 2–2 draw with Glenavon. He netted in a play-off game against Carrick Rangers on 16 April, which Warrenpoint lost 2–1, condemning them to relegation. Wade-Slater made a total of 32 appearances in all competitions, scoring 6 times.

==== 2022–23 season ====
Wade-Slater's first minutes of the 2022/23 NIFL Championship season came in a 3–0 loss to Dundela on 20 August 2022. He scored his first and only goal of the season on 31 January 2023 in a 4–0 win against Knockbreda. Warrenpoint were due to face Dungannon Swifts in a promotion/relegation playoff, with a chance to return to the Premiership, however their Premiership license application was rejected, as was their Championship application. Warrenpoint reached an agreement with the IFA to drop to the third tier, and Wade-Slater was allowed to leave the club after making 28 appearances over the course of the season.

=== Drogheda United ===
Wade-Slater returned to the League of Ireland in July 2023 when he signed for Premier Division club Drogheda United. He made his debut as a substitute on 18 August in an FAI Cup tie away to Kerry FC. His first start came in a 5–0 loss away to Shamrock Rovers on 22 October. Wade-Slater made a further 5 appearances in all competitions as Drogheda finished in 7th place in the league.

=== Longford Town ===
On 7 December 2023, it was announced that Wade-Slater had signed for League of Ireland First Division side Longford Town for the 2024 season.

== International career ==
Wade-Slater appeared regularly for Republic of Ireland at under-17 level, making his debut in February 2015 and earning five caps throughout 2015. He was then called up to play for the under-18 team in May 2016, playing three times within the space of a month.

== Career statistics ==
As of match played 30 August 2025

Appearances and goals by club, season and competition
| Club | Season | League | | | National Cup | | League Cup | | Europe | | Other | | Total | |
| Club | Season | Division | Apps | Goals | Apps | Goals | Apps | Goals | Apps | Goals | Apps | Goals | Apps | Goals |
|---|---|---|---|---|---|---|---|---|---|---|---|---|---|---|
| Stevenage | 2016–17 | EFL League Two | 2 | 0 | 0 | 0 | 0 | 0 | — | | 1 (Note: Appearance(s) in the EFL Trophy) | 0 | 1 | 0 |
| Stevenage | 2017–18 | EFL League Two | 3 | 0 | 0 | 0 | 0 | 0 | — | | 2 | 0 | 4 | 0 |
| Stevenage | 2018–19 | EFL League Two | 2 | 0 | 0 | 0 | 0 | 0 | — | | 0 | 0 | 0 | 0 |
| Stevenage | Total | | 7 | 0 | 0 | 0 | 0 | 0 | — | | 3 | 0 | 5 | 0 |
| Kings Langley (loan) | 2018–19 | SFL Premier Division South | 7 | 6 | 0 | 0 | — | | — | | 0 | 0 | 6 | 5 |
| Bohemians | 2019 | LOI Premier Division | 30 | 3 | 3 | 0 | 2 | 0 | — | | 1 (Note: Appearances in the Scottish Challenge Cup) | 1 | 34 | 2 |
| Bohemians | 2020 | LOI Premier Division | 3 | 0 | 1 | 0 | — | | 0 | 0 | — | | 4 | 0 |
| Bohemians | Total | | 40 | 9 | 4 | 0 | 2 | 0 | 0 | 0 | 1 | 1 | 38 | 2 |
| Larne | 2020–21 | NIFL Premiership | 13 | 0 | 0 | 0 | — | | — | | 0 | 0 | 13 | 0 |
| Warrenpoint Town ft | 2021-22 | NIFL Premiership | 32 | 6 | 0 | 0 | 3 | 0 | – | | 5 | 1 | 40 | 6 |
| Warrenpoint Town ft | 2022-23 | NIFL Championship | 28 | 3 | 1 | 0 | 2 | 0 | – | | 4 | 0 | 35 | 1 |
| Warrenpoint Town ft | Total | | 73 | 9 | 1 | 0 | 5 | 0 | 0 | 0 | 9 | 1 | 75 | 7 |
| Drogheda United | 2023 | LOI Premier Division | 7 | 0 | 2 | 0 | – | | – | | – | | 7 | 0 |
| Longford Town | 2024 | LOI First Division | 17 | 2 | 0 | 0 | – | | – | | 0 | 0 | 16 | 2 |
| Longford Town | 2025 | LOI First Division | 17 | 0 | 1 | 0 | – | | – | | 0 | 0 | 18 | 0 |
| Longford Town | Total | | 41 | 2 | 1 | 0 | 0 | 0 | 0 | 0 | 0 | 0 | 34 | 2 |
| Career total | | | 161 | 18 | 8 | 0 | 7 | 0 | 0 | 0 | 13 | 2 | 188 | 20 |

== Honours ==
Larne

- County Antrim Shield 2020–21
