= Adam Byrne =

Irish rugby union player

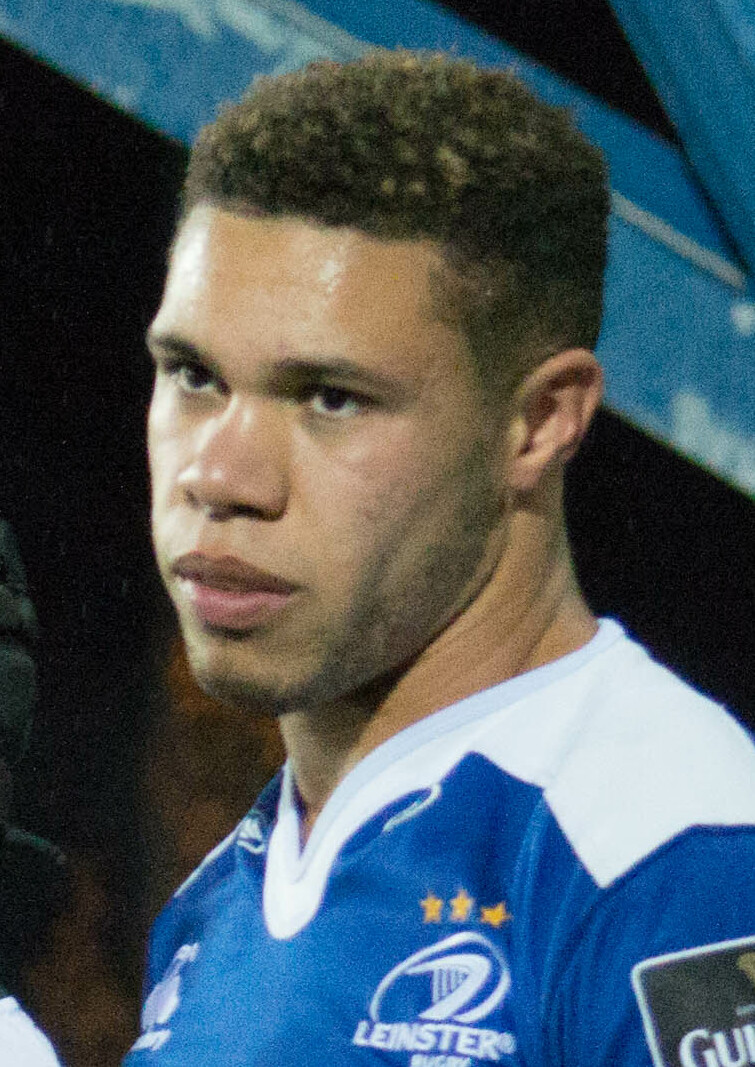
- Byrne in 2016
- Born: 10 April 1994 (age 32) Kill, County Kildare, Ireland
- Height: 1.95 m (6 ft 5 in)
- Weight: 98 kg (15.4 st; 216 lb)
- School: Naas C.B.S.
- University: University College Dublin
- Notable relative: Sam Byrne (brother)

Rugby union career
- Position(s): Wing, Fullback
Senior career
Years	Team	Apps	(Points)
2012–2022	Leinster	66	(120)
2022–2023	Connacht	6	(15)
- Correct as of 18 February 2023
International career
Years	Team	Apps	(Points)
2013–2014	Ireland U20	6	(5)
2017	Ireland	1	(0)
- Correct as of 26 November 2017
National sevens team
Years	Team		Comps
2015	Ireland 7s		1

Adam Byrne (born 20 April 1994) is a former Irish rugby union player, who played for Leinster Rugby and Connacht Rugby. His preferred position was on the wing, although he also played at full-back. His brother Sam is a professional football player.

== Leinster career ==
Byrne made his Leinster senior debut on 29 December 2012 at the age of just 18, making him the youngest ever player to play for Leinster. In the interim, Byrne played for the Leinster A side, which won back to back British & Irish Cup trophies, before fully emerging into the Leinster squad in 2015-16, whilst still a member of the academy. Byrne opened his scoring account for Leinster by crossing the whitewash on only his second ever start, versus Zebre on 12 February 2016. Byrne was awarded a senior development contract with the province to commence in the 2016-17 season.

== Connacht career ==
It was announced in March 2022 that Byrne had signed for Connacht alongside teammates Peter Dooley and Josh Murphy for 2022/2023 season. In April 2023 it was announced that Byrne would leave Connacht at the end of the 2022–23 season. Byrne announced his retirement from rugby in August 2023 at the age of 29.

== National team ==
In 2015 and 2016, Byrne played with the Ireland national rugby sevens team. He played different sevens championships to gain promotion to the 2017 Grand Prix Series. He also played the Olympic qualification tournament, but Ireland failed to qualify for the 2016 Olympics after a defeat against Spain in Cup quarter final (12-7).

On 26 October 2017, Byrne was named in the extended Ireland national rugby union team for the Autumn internationals. He made his debut against Argentina on 25 November 2017, starting as a winger and ending the game as a centre.
