= Danny Mandroiu =

Irish footballer (born 1998)

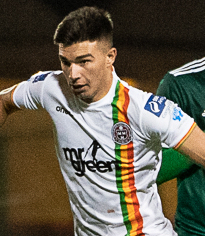
- Danny Mandroiu playing for Bohemians in 2019

Personal information
- Full name: Daniel Jordan Mandroiu
- Date of birth: 20 October 1998 (age 28)
- Place of birth: Dublin, Ireland
- Height: 1.78 m (5 ft 10 in)
- Position: Attacking midfielder

Team information
- Current team: Shamrock Rovers
- Number: 14

Youth career
- –2007: Ballymun United
- 2007–2014: St. Kevin's Boys
- 2014–2019: Brighton & Hove Albion

Senior career*
Years	Team	Apps	(Gls)
2019–2020	Bohemians	37	(14)
2021–2022	Shamrock Rovers	53	(22)
2022–2024	Lincoln City	56	(14)
2024–	Shamrock Rovers	29	(2)

International career
2013–2014	Republic of Ireland U16	7	(2)
2016	Republic of Ireland U18	1	(0)
2017	Republic of Ireland U19	4	(0)
2019–2020	Republic of Ireland U21	7	(0)
- * Club domestic league appearances and goals as of 17 October 2025

Daniel Jordan Mandroiu (Romanian: Daniel Jordan Mândroiu; born 20 October 1998) is an Irish professional footballer who plays as an attacking midfielder for League of Ireland Premier Division club Shamrock Rovers.

== Club career ==
=== Early career ===
Mandroiu started his football career with Ballymun United before joining St. Kevin's Boys aged nine. At the age of 15, Mandroiu was signed by Premier League outfit Brighton & Hove Albion. In the 2018–19 season, he made 11 league appearances for Simon Rusk's Under-23 side in the Premier League 2 Division 2, contributing towards the team's promotion to the top flight of under-23 football. The midfielder fired three goals in those matches, while also finding the back of the net in the EFL Trophy against Oxford United at the Kassam Stadium.

=== Bohemians ===
On 3 December 2018, Brighton announced that Mandroiu had been released and had signed for League of Ireland Premier Division outfit Bohemians. He made his debut for "the Gypsies" on 15 February 2019 in a 1–0 home victory over Finn Harps. His first goal for the club came a week later, when he found the net away to UCD in a 2–0 win. Further goals would come against Derry City and St Patrick's Athletic, with Mandroiu earning numerous plaudits for his performances. He was nominated for the SWAI Player of the Month award for both April and May, but lost out to Bohemians teammate James Talbot and Dundalk's Sean Gannon respectively. Such was his fine form in his debut season, that Bohemians announced on 19 May that the young midfielder had been given a new contract at the club.

On 14 June, Mandroiu scored two goals in a 2–1 Dublin Derby win over rivals Shamrock Rovers, including a game-winning strike from 30 yards out. This was followed up with an SWAI Player of the Month award for June 2019. Mandriou would go on to win PFAI Young Player of the Year, beating off fellow nominees David Parkhouse and Republic of Ireland international Jack Byrne, while he was also named in the PFAI Team of the Year. July 2020 saw Mandroiu linked with a move to Eredivisie side FC Twente but the move did not come to fruition.

=== Shamrock Rovers ===
Mandroiu signed for Bohemians' arch-rivals Shamrock Rovers in December 2020. In June 2021, it emerged that Shamrock Rovers were ordered by the FAI to pay Bohemians a €20,000 compensation fee following a dispute over his transfer. He played an important part in Rovers' league winning season in 2021 and half of the league winning season of 2022, scoring 22 goals over 53 league games. His displays for Rovers in 2021 earned him a call-up to Stephen Kenny's Ireland senior international side for the friendlies against Andorra and Hungary.

=== Lincoln City ===
On 7 July 2022, Mandroiu joined EFL League One club Lincoln City for an undisclosed fee. He would make his long-awaited debut on 1 October 2022 against Bolton Wanderers. His first goal for the club came against Newcastle United U21 in the EFL Trophy.

After an instrumental start to the 2023–24 season, Mandroiu received a League One Player of the Month nomination after scoring two goals and three assists in the opening five games. On 14 October 2023, he was sent off in a 1–0 defeat to Burton Albion. Following the match, manager Mark Kennedy warned the player that he was at a crossroads in his career and unless his approach to the game were to change he could become "just another statistic". Following the end of the 2023–24 season the club confirmed that they were negotiating a new deal with him. On 27 June 2024, manager Michael Skubala admitted that Mandroiu was likely to leave the club following a break-down in negotiations over a new contract.

=== Return to Shamrock Rovers ===
On 19 August 2024, Mandroiu returned to Shamrock Rovers until the end of the season. He signed a new multi-year contract with the club on 31 January 2025. Mandroiu scored his first goal for Rovers on his debut after coming off the bench vs Galway United. On 17 August 2025, Mandroiu scored the winner away to Santa Clara. On 8 November 2025, Mandroiu tore his ACL minutes after coming on off the bench against Cork City in the 2025 FAI Cup final and was ruled out for at least 9 months. After returning from injury in July 2026, he made 5 appearances before sustaining a hamstring injury that saw him visit a specialist in London to further assess the injury.

== International career ==
Also eligible to play for the Romania national team as his father is originally from Romania, Mandroiu has represented the Republic of Ireland at under-16, under-19, and under-21 levels.

He earned his first cap with the under-21s in a European Championship qualifier at home to Luxembourg, coming on as an 86th-minute replacement for Connor Ronan. The Republic of Ireland would win the game 3–0 in what was manager Stephen Kenny's first game in charge. Following this, Mandroiu was not included in Kenny's squad for the Toulon Tournament.

In September 2019, Mandroiu was selected by Kenny for Ireland's squad in upcoming qualifiers against Armenia and Sweden. He came on as a substitute against Armenia and started against Sweden, with Ireland beating Armenia 1–0 at home and Sweden 3–1 away. He was subsequently called into the squad for the October qualifying clashes against Italy and Iceland, although he remained benched for the entire match against the young Italians.

On 24 May 2021, Mandroiu received his first call up to the Republic of Ireland senior squad for the summer friendlies against Andorra and Hungary, but remained an unused substitute in both.

== Career statistics ==
As of match played on 20 August 2026

Appearances and goals by club, season and competition
Club	Season	League			National cup (Note: Includes FAI Cup, FA Cup)		League cup (Note: Includes League of Ireland Cup, EFL Cup)		Europe		Other		Total	
Club	Season	Division	Apps	Goals	Apps	Goals	Apps	Goals	Apps	Goals	Apps	Goals	Apps	Goals
Brighton & Hove Albion U23	2016–17	—	—		—		—		—		1 (Note: Appearance(s) in the EFL Trophy)	0	1	0
Brighton & Hove Albion U23	2017–18	—	—		—		—		—		2	1	2	1
Brighton & Hove Albion U23	2018–19	—	—		—		—		—		1	0	1	0
Brighton & Hove Albion U23	Total		—		—		—		—		4	1	4	1
Bohemians	2019	LOI Premier Division	28	11	3	2	3	1	—		0	0	34	14
Bohemians	2020	LOI Premier Division	9	3	0	0	—		1 (Note: Appearance in the UEFA Europa League)	0	—		10	3
Bohemians	Total		37	14	3	2	3	1	1	0	0	0	44	17
Shamrock Rovers	2021	LOI Premier Division	35	15	1	0	—		6 (Note: Two appearances in the UEFA Champions League, four appearances in the UEFA Conference League)	0	1 (Note: Appearance in the President of Ireland's Cup)	0	43	15
Shamrock Rovers	2022	LOI Premier Division	18	7	—		—		—		1	0	19	7
Shamrock Rovers	Total		53	22	1	0	—		6	0	2	0	62	22
Lincoln City	2022–23	League One	25	6	0	0	1	0	—		3	1	29	7
Lincoln City	2023–24	League One	31	8	1	0	2	0	—		2	0	36	8
Lincoln City	Total		56	14	1	0	3	0	—		5	1	65	15
Shamrock Rovers	2024	LOI Premier Division	10	1	—		—		6 (Note: Two appearances in the UEFA Europa League, four appearances in the UEFA Conference League)	0	—		16	1
Shamrock Rovers	2025	LOI Premier Division	19	1	5	1	—		10 (Note: 1 appearance in the 2024–25 UEFA Conference League; 9 appearances, 3 goals in the 2025–26 UEFA Conference League)	3	0	0	34	5
Shamrock Rovers	2026	LOI Premier Division	0	0	1	0	—		4 (Note: 1 appearance in the UEFA Champions League: 2 appearances in the UEFA Europa League; 1 appearance in the UEFA Conference League)	0	0	0	5	0
Shamrock Rovers	Total		29	2	6	1	—		20	3	0	0	55	6
Career total			175	52	11	3	6	1	27	3	11	2	230	61

== Honours ==
Shamrock Rovers

- League of Ireland Premier Division: 2021, 2022, 2025
- FAI Cup: 2025
- President of Ireland's Cup: 2022

Individual

- PFAI Young Player of the Year: 2019
- PFAI Team of the Year: 2019
- League of Ireland Player of the Month: June 2019, October 2021
