= Kenan Avdusinović =

Luxembourgish footballer (born 1998)

Personal information
- Date of birth: 3 March 1998 (age 28)
- Place of birth: Luxembourg
- Height: 1.71 m (5 ft 7 in)
- Positions: Winger; forward

Team information
- Current team: FC Progrès Niederkorn (on loan from US Hostert)
- Number: 80

Youth career
- –2011: US Hostert
- 2011–2015: FC Swift Hesperange

Senior career*
Years	Team	Apps	(Gls)
2015–2017	FC Swift Hesperange	21	(7)
2017–2020	Union Titus Pétange	29	(0)
2019–2020	→ FC Differdange 03 (loan)	17	(3)
2020–2023	FC Swift Hesperange	36	(1)
2023–	US Hostert	47	(28)
2025–	→ FC Progrès Niederkorn (loan)	25	(11)

International career^{‡}
2025–	Luxembourg	1	(0)
- * Club domestic league appearances and goals as of 6 June 2026 ‡ National team caps and goals as of 17 November 2025

Kenan Avdusinović (born 3 March 1998) is a Luxembourgish professional footballer who plays as a winger or forward for FC Progrès Niederkorn on loan from US Hostert.

== Early life ==
Avdusinović was born on 3 March 1998 in Luxembourg. The son of Safet and Ermina, he is of Bosnia and Herzegovina descent through his parents.

== Career ==
Avdusinović started his career with FC Swift Hesperange, where he made twenty-one league appearances and scored seven goals. Following his stint there, he signed for Union Titus Pétange in 2017, where he made twenty-nine league appearances and scored zero goals. Two years later, he was sent on loan to FC Differdange 03, where he made seventeen league appearances and scored three goals.

During the summer of 2020, he returned to FC Swift Hesperange, where he made thirty-six league appearances and scored one goal. Three years later, he signed for US Hostert. Ahead of the 2025-2026 season, he was sent on loan to FC Progrès Niederkorn.

== Style of play ==
Avdusinović plays as a winger or forward. Right-footed, he has received comparisons to Switzerland international Xherdan Shaqiri.

== International career ==
On 17 November 2025, he debuted for the Luxembourg national football team during a 0–1 away loss against the Northern Ireland national football team in a 2026 FIFA World Cup qualifier.
