= Jake Larsson =

Swedish footballer

Personal information
- Full name: Jake Mikael Larsson
- Date of birth: 9 January 1999 (age 27)
- Place of birth: Sweden
- Height: 1.76 m (5 ft 9 in)
- Position: Midfielder

Youth career
- 2006–2010: Adolfsbergs IK
- 2011–2015: Karlslunds IF
- 2018: Hammarby IF

Senior career*
Years	Team	Apps	(Gls)
2016–2017	Karlslunds IF	41	(7)
2019–2023	Örebro SK	117	(16)
2024	Žalgiris	8	(1)

International career^{‡}
2019	Sweden U21	6	(2)
- * Club domestic league appearances and goals as of 5 March 2025 ‡ National team caps and goals as of 19 November 2019

Jake Mikael Larsson (born 9 January 1999) is a Swedish footballer who plays as a midfielder.

== Career ==
Beginning his career in Adolfsbergs IK at the age of 7, he moved to Karlslunds IF at the age of 12 and joined the first team at the age of 17. He managed 41 league games and 7 league goals there. Following one year with Hammarby IF's U19 and U21, he signed for the first team of Örebro SK in 2019.

Showing stellar form at Örebro SK, he made his debut for Sweden U21 and was seen as a transfer prospect. In September 2020, however, he suffered the death of his brother, and subsequently "collapsed" as a player. He spent the winter of 2021 in rehabilitation physically and mentally.

On 15 March 2024, Larsson signed with Lithuanian A Lyga club Žalgiris.
