= Ísak Ólafsson =

Icelandic footballer (born 2000)

Personal information
- Full name: Ísak Óli Ólafsson
- Date of birth: 30 June 2000 (age 26)
- Place of birth: Iceland
- Height: 1.90 m (6 ft 3 in)
- Position: Centre-back

Team information
- Current team: FH
- Number: 22

Youth career
- –2017: Keflavík

Senior career*
Years	Team	Apps	(Gls)
2017–2019	Keflavík	60	(3)
2019–2021	SønderjyskE	4	(0)
2021	→ Keflavík (loan)	6	(0)
2021–2024	Esbjerg fB	52	(3)
2024–	FH	67	(6)

International career^{‡}
2016	Iceland U-16	8	(1)
2016	Iceland U-17	2	(0)
2017–2018	Iceland U-19	6	(1)
2019–2022	Iceland U-21	18	(2)
2021–	Iceland	2	(0)
- * Club domestic league appearances and goals as of 16 November 2026 ‡ National team caps and goals as of 27 September 2022

Ísak Óli Ólafsson (born 30 June 2000) is an Icelandic professional footballer who plays as a centre-back for FH.

== Club career ==
Ísak started his career with local club Keflavík before transferring to SønderjyskE in late August 2019. To gain more playing time, Ólafsson was loaned out to his former club Keflavík on 19 March 2021 until the end of July 2021.

On 20 June 2021, Ólafsson signed a three-year deal with Esbjerg fB. On 4 April 2024, Esbjerg FB announced that they, in cooperation with Ólafsson, ended the contract, after which he signed a contract with FH.

== International career ==
Ísak has featured for the U-16, U-17, U-19 and U-21 Icelandic youth national teams.
