= Derek Pender =

Irish association footballer

Personal information
- Date of birth: 2 October 1983 (age 43)
- Place of birth: Dublin, Ireland
- Position: Full back

Youth career
- Belevedere

Senior career*
Years	Team	Apps	(Gls)
2003–2004	Shelbourne	0	(0)
2004	→ Crusaders (loan)		
2004	→ Dundalk (loan)	7	(0)
2005–2006	Dublin City	30	(0)
2006–2007	Shamrock Rovers	26	(1)
2008–2009	Bray Wanderers	53	(1)
2010–2011	St Patrick's Athletic	59	(1)
2012–2019	Bohemians	191	(4)

International career
2002	Republic of Ireland U21	0	(0)

Managerial career
- 2020: Bohemians U17
- 2022: Bohemians (interim)
- 2024: Bohemians (interim)
- * Club domestic league appearances and goals

Derek Pender (born 2 October 1983) is an Irish football manager and former footballer who played as a full-back for League of Ireland clubs Shelbourne, Dundalk, Dublin City, Shamrock Rovers, Bray Wanderers, St Patrick's Athletic and Bohemians, as well as NIFL Premiership side Crusaders.

== Managerial career ==
=== Early career ===
Upon his retirement from playing for Bohemian F.C. in League of Ireland after the 2019 season, Pender joined the club's youth academy as the U17 manager on 7 January 2020. He lifted the league trophy after his side comfortably beat Shamrock Rovers 2–0 in the final. On 1 February 2021 Bohemians announced that Pender was promoted to a first team role as player development coach.

== Club career ==
=== Early years ===
Pender played schoolboy football from u17s to u19s with Belvedere, a club based in the North Dublin neighbourhood of Fairvew. At Belvedere he was team-mates and friends with future Republic of Ireland international Wes Hoolahan. His senior football career began in 2003 with League of Ireland Premier Division outfit Shelbourne, for whom he made occasional appearances in cup competitions. In January 2004 he spent a month on loan at NIFL Premiership side Crusaders. He was sent on loan to Dundalk in August 2004 for the rest of the season. At the end of the 2004 season he signed for Dermot Keely's Dublin City. Pender would make 30 appearances for the Vikings in 2005 as the club won promotion to the Premier Division after a tense play-off victory over Shamrock Rovers, but midway through 2006 the club folded. He then signed for Tallaght-based Shamrock Rovers, making his debut for the club in a 2–2 draw away to Monaghan United on 1 September 2006.

By the end of the 2006 season, Pender had won the First Division title, making nine appearances and scoring once as the Hoops returned to the top tier. He made a further 17 appearances in 2007 but at the end of the season, he signed for Wicklow outfit Bray Wanderers.

=== Bray Wanderers ===
Pender was a regular in the Bray defence for the next two seasons, making 53 appearances for the Seagulls before signing for Pete Mahon at Inchicore-based St Patrick's Athletic in December 2009.

=== St Patrick's Athletic ===
Derek made 59 league appearances for St Pats over the following two seasons and quickly became a fans' favourite with his tough tackling, no-nonsense approach. In January 2012 he moved across the city to sign for Aaron Callaghan at Phibsboro-based Bohemians.

=== Bohemians ===
Pender played 23 league games, scoring once, for Bohemians in the 2012 season as they finished sixth. He followed this up with another 30 appearances in 2013 season as Bohemians ended up in tenth. He re-signed for Bohemians for the 2014 season and made 28 league appearances, primarily at right-back. New boss Keith Long named Pender as captain for the 2015 season, a position he has held ever since. He made 13 league appearances in the first fourteen games before an injury ruled him out for the rest of the season. Bohs went on to finish fifth, just missing out on European football. Recovered from injury, Derek missed just three of Bohemians' 33 league games in 2016 season. In October 2017 Derek signed on for the 2018 season in which he played 19 times, scoring once. He would also captain Bohemians in the two matches of their 2018-19 Scottish Challenge Cup run.

On 16 July 2019, Pender received a one-match ban along with UCD goalkeeper Conor Kearns after both were punished for violent conduct during a match in which the Students had beaten Bohemians 1–0.

== International career ==
Pender has represented the Republic of Ireland at under-age level. In May 2008, his former manager at Shelbourne, Pat Fenlon called him up to the Republic of Ireland Under 23 side for a tie against Northern Ireland in the Challenge Trophy.

== Coaching career ==
His first steps in management came when he took over the Bohemians Under 17 side, guiding them to the League of Ireland U17 Division in 2020.

Pender was named as interim manager of Bohemians on 30 August 2022 following the sacking of Keith Long.

He was again named interim manager in March 2024, following Declan Devine's sacking as manager.

== Honours ==
=== Player ===
Shamrock Rovers

- League of Ireland First Division: 2006

Individual

- Bohemians Player of the Year: 2014

=== Manager ===
Bohemians U17

- League of Ireland U17 Division: 2020
