= David Parkhouse =

Northern Irish association football player

Personal information
- Full name: David Cain Parkhouse
- Date of birth: 24 October 1999 (age 27)
- Place of birth: Strabane, Northern Ireland
- Height: 1.85 m (6 ft 1 in)
- Position: Striker

Team information
- Current team: Moyola Park
- Number: 9

Youth career
- –2016: Maiden City
- 2016–2017: Sheffield United

Senior career*
Years	Team	Apps	(Gls)
2017–2021	Sheffield United	0	(0)
2018	→ Boston United (loan)	3	(0)
2018	→ Tamworth (loan)	3	(0)
2019	→ Derry City (loan)	34	(11)
2020	→ Stevenage (loan)	4	(0)
2020	→ Hartlepool United (loan)	6	(1)
2021	Derry City	17	(0)
2021–2023	Ballymena United	29	(6)
2023	→ Cliftonville (loan)	15	(1)
2023–2025	Harland & Wolff Welders	56	(11)
2025–present	Moyola Park	26	(27)

International career
2015	Northern Ireland U17	3	(0)
2017–2020	Northern Ireland U21	17	(3)
- * Club domestic league appearances and goals as of 10:26, 6 October 2023 (UTC)

David Cain Parkhouse (born 24 October 1999) is a Northern Irish footballer who plays for NIFL Championship side Moyola Park. He has previously played for Ballymena United, Cliftonville, Sheffield United, Boston United, Tamworth, Derry City, Stevenage, Hartlepool United, and H&W Welders.

== Club career ==
=== Early career and move to Sheffield United ===
Raised in Strabane, Northern Ireland, Parkhouse played with Maiden City's Academy in Derry and impressed enough to earn a move to the Academy at English club Sheffield United. He was named on the bench for the first team squad for the first time in August 2018, remaining an unused substitute in an EFL Cup game against Hull City.

==== Boston United loan ====
He signed for Boston United on a short-term loan deal in October 2018 in a move which saw him make 3 appearances before returning to his parent club.

==== Tamworth loan ====
On 30 November 2018, Parkhouse along with his teammate Reon Potts signed for Tamworth. Parkhouse made his debut on 1 December 2018 in a 3–1 home defeat at the hands of Coalville Town, Parkhouse was introduced as a half time substitute for Charlie Jemson. David was recalled by Sheffield United on 27 December 2018.

==== Derry City loan ====
Parkhouse signed for League of Ireland Premier Division side Derry City on a 6-month loan deal on 2 January 2019, with manager Declan Devine stating "The Derry public will love watching David Parkhouse play". He scored his first goal in senior football on 15 February 2019 in a 3–0 win over UCD on the opening night of the season. His loan deal was extended on 1 July until the end of the season in October. Parkhouse scored all 4 goals as Derry beat Waterford 4–2 in the League Cup, to earn a place in the final. He opened the scoring in the League Cup Final after just two minutes but the day ended in disappointment for Parkhouse and Derry as they were defeated on penalties by Dundalk. On 23 October 2019, he was named in the PFAI Team of the Year and was also nominated for PFAI Young Player of the Year alongside Republic of Ireland international Jack Byrne and eventual winner Danny Mandroiu, following an excellent first full season in senior football. He finished the season with 19 goals in 39 appearances for the club in all competitions. He returned to Sheffield United at the end of the League of Ireland season with Derry City reportedly interested in re-signing him ahead of the 2020 season.

On 24 December 2019, it was revealed that Parkhouse had turned down a new contract offer from Sheffield United, with Celtic, Everton and Blackburn Rovers reportedly interested in the striker, whose contract was due to end six months later.

==== Stevenage loan ====
On 28 January 2020, it was announced that Parkhouse had signed new two-and-a-half-year contract with Sheffield United. On the same day it was also announced that he had signed a loan deal with EFL League Two side Stevenage until the end of the season. He played 4 games before the season ended prematurely due to the COVID-19 pandemic.

==== Hartlepool United loan ====
On 10 September 2020, Parkhouse signed on loan until January 2021 for National League side Hartlepool United. Parkhouse scored his first Hartlepool goal in a 6–0 FA Cup victory at Ilkeston Town.

=== Derry City ===
On 13 January 2021, it was announced that Parkhouse had returned to his hometown club Derry City on a permanent basis, signing a 3-year contract. After 17 games without a goal, the club looked to sell the striker on if their valuation was matched. Derry turned down a bid from Cliftonville for Parkhouse in July 2021.

=== Ballymena United ===
It was announced on 11 August 2021 that Parkhouse had signed for NIFL Premiership side Ballymena United, after Derry City accepted an undisclosed fee.

==== Cliftonville loan ====
On 11 January 2023, Parkhouse signed on loan for Cliftonville until the end of the season

=== H&W Welders ===
It was announced on 29 July 2023 that Parkhouse had signed for H&W Welders of the NIFL Championship.

== International career ==
Parkhouse has represented Northern Ireland up to Northern Ireland U21 level. His first goal for the U21 team came on 8 June 2017, when he scored away to Estonia U21.

== Career statistics ==
As of 21 October 2022

Appearances and goals by club, season and competition
Club	Season	League			National Cup		League Cup		Other		Total	
Club	Season	Division	Apps	Goals	Apps	Goals	Apps	Goals	Apps	Goals	Apps	Goals
Sheffield United	2018–19	Championship	0	0	0	0	0	0	—		0	0
Sheffield United	2019–20	Premier League	0	0	0	0	0	0	—		0	0
Sheffield United	2020–21	Premier League	0	0	—		0	0	—		0	0
Sheffield United	Total		0	0	0	0	0	0	—		0	0
Boston United (loan)	2018–19	National League North	3	0	—		—		0	0	3	0
Tamworth (loan)	2018–19	Southern League Premier Division Central	3	0	—		—		0	0	3	0
Derry City (loan)	2019	League of Ireland Premier Division	34	11	1	1	4	7	—		39	19
Stevenage (loan)	2019–20	League Two	4	0	—		—		—		4	0
Hartlepool United (loan)	2020–21	National League	6	1	2	1	—		1 (Note: Appearances in FA Trophy)	0	9	2
Derry City	2021	League of Ireland Premier Division	17	0	0	0	—		—		17	0
Ballymena United	2021–22	NIFL Premiership	17	6	5	1	1	0	0	0	23	7
Ballymena United	2022–23	NIFL Premiership	10	0	0	0	1	0	0	0	11	0
Ballymena United	Cliftonville	2022–23	NIFL Premiership									
