= Jónatan Ingi Jónsson =

Icelandic footballer

Personal information
- Date of birth: 15 March 1999 (age 27)
- Place of birth: Iceland
- Position: Winger

Team information
- Current team: Valur
- Number: 10

Youth career
- –2015: FH
- 2015–2018: AZ

Senior career*
Years	Team	Apps	(Gls)
2018–2021	FH	73	(13)
2022–2024	Sogndal	60	(16)
2024–	Valur	67	(21)

International career^{‡}
2014	Iceland U15	4	(0)
2015	Iceland U16	6	(2)
2015–2016	Iceland U17	7	(2)
2017	Iceland U19	2	(0)
2018–2019	Iceland U21	10	(2)
2022	Iceland	2	(0)
- * Club domestic league appearances and goals as of 16 November 2026 ‡ National team caps and goals as of 26 May 2025

Jónatan Ingi Jónsson (born 15 March 1999) is an Icelandic footballer who plays as a winger for Valur and the Iceland national team.

== Career ==
Jónatan started his senior career with his local club FH in 2018 after having spent three years in the youth teams of AZ in the Netherlands. Jónatan transferred from FH to Sogndal before the 2022 season. In the weeks before the start of 2024 season, Icelandic giants Valur made it clear that Jónatan was at the top of their wanted list for the upcoming season, he was signed for an undisclosed fee.

== International career ==
Jónatan Ingi made his international debut for Iceland on 6 November 2022 in a friendly match against Saudi Arabia.

== Career statistics ==
=== Club ===
As of match played 26 October 2024

Appearances and goals by club, season and competition
Club	Season	League			National cup (Note: Includes Icelandic Cup, Norwegian Cup)		Continental		Other		Total	
Club	Season	Division	Apps	Goals	Apps	Goals	Apps	Goals	Apps	Goals	Apps	Goals
FH	2015	Úrvalsdeild	0	0	0	0	0	0	—		0	0
FH	2018	Úrvalsdeild	13	2	1	0	1 (Note: Appearance(s) in UEFA Europa League)	0	—		15	2
FH	2019	Úrvalsdeild	21	1	5	0	—		—		26	1
FH	2020	Úrvalsdeild	16	4	2	0	1	0	—		19	4
FH	2021	Úrvalsdeild	22	6	2	0	4 (Note: Appearance(s) in UEFA Europa Conference League)	0	—		28	6
FH	Total		72	13	10	0	6	0	—		88	13
Sogndal	2022	Norwegian First Division	30	11	2	0	—		—		32	11
Sogndal	2023	Norwegian First Division	30	5	2	1	—		—		32	6
Sogndal	Total		60	16	4	1	—		—		64	17
Valur	2024	Úrvalsdeild	26	11	4	2	4	0	1 (Note: Appearance(s) in Icelandic Super Cup)	0	35	13
Career total			158	40	18	3	10	0	1	0	187	43

=== International ===
As of match played 11 November 2022

Appearances and goals by national team and year
National team	Year	Apps	Goals
Iceland	2022	2	0
Total		2	0
