= 2019 League of Ireland Premier Division =

League of Ireland Premier Division
- Season: 2019
- Dates: 15 February – 25 October 2019
- Champions: Dundalk (14th title)
- Relegated: UCD
- Champions League: Dundalk
- Europa League: Shamrock Rovers; Bohemians; Derry City
- Matches: 180
- Goals: 431 (2.39 per match)
- Top goalscorer: Junior Ogedi-Uzokwe (14 goals)
- Biggest home win: Bohemians 10–1 UCD (16 August 2019)
- Biggest away win: UCD 0–5 Dundalk (30 August 2019)
- Highest scoring: Bohemians 10–1 UCD (16 August 2019)
- Longest winning run: Dundalk (21 games)
- Longest unbeaten run: Dundalk (23 games)
- Longest winless run: UCD (12 games)
- Longest losing run: UCD (11 games)
- Highest attendance: 7,021 Shamrock Rovers 1–0 Bohemians (30 August 2019)
- Total attendance: 375,705
- Average attendance: 2,087
- All statistics correct as of 26 October 2019.

The 2019 League of Ireland Premier Division is the 35th season of the League of Ireland Premier Division. The league began in 15 February 2019 and concluded in 25 October 2019. Fixtures were announced in December 2018.

On 23 September, Dundalk won the title after a 3–2 win over Shamrock Rovers.

== Overview ==
The Premier Division consists of 10 teams. Each team plays each other four times for 36 matches in the season.

UCD, the 2018 First Division champion, were promoted to the league for the first time since 2014, and Finn Harps, winners of the promotion/relegation playoffs, were promoted to the league, returning after the absence in the previous season.

== Teams ==
=== Stadia and locations ===
Locations of Premier Division teams
Locations of Dublin Premier Division teams

Team	Location	Stadium	Capacity
Bohemians	Dublin (Phibsborough)	Dalymount Park	3,640
Cork City	Cork	Turners Cross	7,845
Derry City	Derry	Brandywell Stadium	3,700
Dundalk	Dundalk	Oriel Park	4,500
Finn Harps	Ballybofey	Finn Park	6,000
Shamrock Rovers	Dublin (Tallaght)	Tallaght Stadium	8,000
Sligo Rovers	Sligo	The Showgrounds	5,500
St Patrick's Athletic	Dublin (Inchicore)	Richmond Park	5,340
UCD	Dublin (Belfield)	UCD Bowl	3,000
Waterford	Waterford	Regional Sports Centre	5,500

=== Personnel and kits ===
Note: Flags indicate national team as has been defined under FIFA eligibility rules. Players may hold more than one non-FIFA nationality.

Team	Manager	Captain	Kit manufacturer	Shirt sponsor
Bohemians	(Republic of Ireland) Keith Long	(Republic of Ireland) Derek Pender	O'Neills	Mr Green Sport
Cork City	(England) Neale Fenn	(Republic of Ireland) Conor McCormack	Adidas	University College Cork
Derry City	(Northern Ireland) Declan Devine	(Republic of Ireland) Barry McNamee	Adidas	Diamond Corrugated
Dundalk	(Republic of Ireland) Vinny Perth	(Republic of Ireland) Brian Gartland	CX+ Sport	Fyffes
Finn Harps	(Republic of Ireland) Ollie Horgan	(Republic of Ireland) Keith Cowan	Joma	KN Group
St Patrick's Athletic	(Republic of Ireland) Stephen O'Donnell	(Republic of Ireland) Ian Bermingham	Umbro	MIG Insurance Brokers
Shamrock Rovers	(Republic of Ireland) Stephen Bradley	(Republic of Ireland) Ronan Finn	New Balance	Pepper Money
Sligo Rovers	(Republic of Ireland) Liam Buckley	(Republic of Ireland) Kyle Callan-McFadden	Joma	Volkswagen
UCD	(Poland) Maciej Tarnogrodzki	(Republic of Ireland) Liam Scales	O'Neills	O'Neills
Waterford	(Republic of Ireland) Alan Reynolds	(Republic of Ireland) Kenny Browne	Umbro	21Bet

=== Managerial changes ===
Team	Outgoing manager	Manner of departure	Date of vacancy	Position in table	Incoming manager	Date of appointment
Dundalk	(Republic of Ireland) Stephen Kenny	Signed by Republic of Ireland U21	24 November 2018	Pre-season	(Republic of Ireland) Vinny Perth	22 December 2018
Cork City	(Republic of Ireland) John Caulfield	Mutual consent	1 May 2019	8th	(Republic of Ireland) John Cotter	2 May 2019
Cork City	(Republic of Ireland) John Cotter	Appointed first-team head coach	30 June 2019	7th	(Republic of Ireland) Frank Kelleher	30 June 2019
UCD	(Republic of Ireland) Collie O'Neill	Sacked	19 August 2019	10th	(Poland) Maciej Tarnogrodzki	21 August 2019
St Patrick's Athletic	(Republic of Ireland) Harry Kenny	Mutual consent	24 August 2019	5th	(Republic of Ireland) Stephen O'Donnell	31 August 2019
Cork City	(Republic of Ireland) Frank Kelleher	Change of role	26 August 2019	7th	(Republic of Ireland) Neale Fenn	26 August 2019

== League table ==
Pos	Team	Pld	W	D	L	GF	GA	GD	Pts	Qualification or relegation
1	Dundalk (C)	36	27	5	4	73	18	+55	86	Qualification for Champions League first qualifying round
2	Shamrock Rovers	36	23	6	7	62	21	+41	75	Qualification for Europa League first qualifying round (Note: Since the winners of the 2019 FAI Cup (Shamrock Rovers) qualified for European competition based on their league position, the final spot awarded to the Cup winner passed to the next best-placed team i.e fourth-placed team.)
3	Bohemians	36	17	9	10	47	28	+19	60	Qualification for Europa League first qualifying round
4	Derry City	36	15	12	9	56	34	+22	57	Qualification for Europa League first qualifying round
5	St Patrick's Athletic	36	14	10	12	29	35	−6	52	
6	Waterford	36	12	7	17	46	53	−7	43	
7	Sligo Rovers	36	10	12	14	38	47	−9	42	
8	Cork City	36	9	10	17	29	49	−20	37	
9	Finn Harps (O)	36	7	7	22	26	64	−38	28	Qualification for relegation play-offs
10	UCD (R)	36	5	4	27	25	82	−57	19	Relegation to League of Ireland First Division

Source: SSE Airtricity League, Soccerway
Rules for classification: 1) Points; 2) Goal difference; 3) Goals scored.
(C) Champions; (O) Play-off winners; (R) Relegated

== Results ==
=== Matches 1–18 ===
Teams played each other twice (once at home, once away).

Home \ Away	BOH	COR	DER	DUN	FHA	STP	SHM	SLI	UCD	WAT
Bohemians	—	0–1	1–1	0–2	1–0	1–0	1–0	1–2	3–0	0–0
Cork City	2–0	—	0–0	0–2	1–1	1–1	1–3	0–0	2–0	0–2
Derry City	0–2	2–0	—	0–2	4–0	1–1	0–1	2–0	3–0	3–2
Dundalk	1–0	1–0	2–2	—	3–0	1–0	2–1	1–1	2–1	4–0
Finn Harps	0–1	3–4	2–3	1–1	—	0–2	0–1	1–2	3–0	3–2
St Patrick's Athletic	1–1	1–0	1–3	1–0	0–0	—	0–1	2–1	2–0	0–3
Shamrock Rovers	0–1	2–0	2–0	0–0	3–0	1–0	—	3–0	3–1	2–1
Sligo Rovers	0–2	1–2	0–0	2–1	1–1	0–1	2–1	—	1–0	0–0
UCD	0–2	2–1	0–2	1–3	3–0	1–1	0–1	0–2	—	4–1
Waterford	0–0	2–0	2–2	0–3	4–0	2–0	1–2	3–3	1–0	—

Source: SSE Airtricity League, Extratime.ie
Legend: Blue = home team win; Yellow = draw; Red = away team win.
For upcoming matches, an "a" indicates there is an article about the rivalry between the two participants.

=== Matches 19–36 ===
Teams will play each other twice (once home, once away).

Home \ Away	BOH	COR	DER	DUN	FHA	STP	SHM	SLI	UCD	WAT
Bohemians	—	1–0	0–0	2–1	5–3	3–0	2–1	2–1	10–1	1–2
Cork City	0–0	—	1–4	1–0	0–0	0–1	1–1	2–4	3–2	1–2
Derry City	0–0	4–0	—	2–2	4–0	1–3	0–2	3–0	0–0	2–0
Dundalk	2–1	1–0	1–0	—	5–0	4–0	3–2	4–0	3–0	3–0
Finn Harps	1–0	0–0	1–0	0–3	—	1–2	0–3	2–0	0–0	1–0
St Patrick's Athletic	0–0	1–1	1–0	0–1	1–0	—	0–2	2–1	0–0	0–2
Shamrock Rovers	1–0	3–0	2–2	0–1	1–0	0–0	—	0–0	7–0	2–1
Sligo Rovers	1–1	1–1	1–2	0–2	3–1	1–1	0–0	—	5–1	0–0
UCD	3–0	0–1	1–3	0–5	1–0	0–1	0–3	0–2	—	1–2
Waterford	1–2	1–2	1–1	0–1	0–1	1–2	1–5	2–0	4–2	—

Source: SSE Airtricity League, Soccerway
Legend: Blue = home team win; Yellow = draw; Red = away team win.
For upcoming matches, an "a" indicates there is an article about the rivalry between the two participants.

== Promotion/relegation playoff ==
Finn Harps, who finished ninth in the Premier Division, faced the First Division's Drogheda United to determine which club would participate in the 2020 Premier Division.

28 October 2019	Drogheda United	1–0	Finn Harps	United Park
19:45	Chris Lyons 90+4'	Report		Attendance: 1,400 (Est.); Referee: Rob Hennessey

1 November 2019	Finn Harps	2–0 (a.e.t.) (2–1 agg.)	Drogheda United	Finn Park
19:45	Mark Russell 7' Harry Ascroft 107'	Report		Referee: Neil Doyle

== Season statistics ==
=== Top scorers ===
Rank	Player	Club	Goals
1	(England) Junior Ogedi-Uzokwe	Derry City	14
2	(Republic of Ireland) Patrick Hoban	Dundalk	13
3	(Northern Ireland) Michael Duffy	Dundalk	12
4	(Republic of Ireland) Danny Mandroiu	Bohemians	11
4	(Northern Ireland) David Parkhouse	Derry City	11
4	(Republic of Ireland) Aaron Greene	Shamrock Rovers	11
4	(Jamaica) Romeo Parkes	Sligo Rovers	11
8	(Northern Ireland) Aaron McEneff	Shamrock Rovers	10
9	(Republic of Ireland) Daniel Kelly	Dundalk	9
10	(Republic of Ireland) Georgie Kelly	Dundalk	8
10	(Republic of Ireland) Jack Byrne	Shamrock Rovers	8
10	(Republic of Ireland) Graham Cummins	Shamrock Rovers	8
10	(Republic of Ireland) Ronan Coughlan	Sligo Rovers	8

Last updated: 31 October 2019.
Source: http://www.extratime.ie/topscorers/2031/100/league-of-ireland-premier-division-2019/

== Awards ==
=== Player of the Month ===
Month	Player	Club	References
February	(Republic of Ireland) Daniel Corcoran	Bohemians	
March	(Republic of Ireland) Jack Byrne	Shamrock Rovers	
April	(Republic of Ireland) James Talbot	Bohemians	
May	(Republic of Ireland) Sean Gannon	Dundalk	
June	(Republic of Ireland) Danny Mandroiu	Bohemians	
July	(Republic of Ireland) Jack Byrne	Shamrock Rovers	
August	(Republic of Ireland) Daniel Cleary	Dundalk	
September	(Northern Ireland) Michael Duffy	Dundalk	

=== Annual awards ===
Award	Winner	Club
PFAI Player of the Year	(Republic of Ireland) Jack Byrne	Shamrock Rovers
PFAI Young Player of the Year	(Republic of Ireland) Danny Mandroiu	Bohemians
PFAI Premier Division Manager of the Year	(Republic of Ireland) Vinny Perth	Dundalk

PFAI Team of the Year
Goalkeeper	(Northern Ireland) Alan Mannus (Shamrock Rovers)			
Defenders	(Republic of Ireland) Sean Gannon (Dundalk)	(Republic of Ireland) Seán Hoare (Dundalk)	(Republic of Ireland) Lee Grace (Shamrock Rovers)	(Republic of Ireland) Seán Kavanagh (Shamrock Rovers)
Midfielders	(Republic of Ireland) Danny Mandroiu (Bohemians)		(Republic of Ireland) Chris Shields (Dundalk)	(Republic of Ireland) Jack Byrne (Shamrock Rovers)
Forwards	(Northern Ireland) David Parkhouse (Derry City)		(Republic of Ireland) Patrick Hoban (Dundalk)	(Republic of Ireland) Michael Duffy (Dundalk)

== Attendances ==
No.	Club	Average
1	Shamrock Rovers	3,445
2	Bohemian	2,878
3	Dundalk	2,753
4	Derry City	2,633
5	Cork City	2,505
6	Sligo Rovers	1,996
7	St. Patrick's Athletic	1,890
8	Waterford United	1,597
9	Finn Harps	1,158
10	UCD	739

== See also ==
- 2019 League of Ireland First Division
- 2019 FAI Cup
- 2019 League of Ireland Cup
